= Los Angeles Chargers all-time roster =

1,516 players have appeared in at least one regular season or postseason game in the National Football League (NFL) or American Football League (AFL) for the Los Angeles Chargers franchise since 1960. This list is accurate through the end of the 2025 NFL season.

== A ==
- Vince Abbott
- Oday Aboushi
- Rick Ackerman
- Curtis Adams
- Jahleel Addae
- Nasir Adderley
- Ben Agajanian
- Charles Aiu
- Seyi Ajirotutu
- Harold Akin
- Ethan Albright
- Lionel Aldridge
- Arnold Ale
- Danario Alexander
- Stephen Alexander
- Anthony Allen
- Brevin Allen
- Chuck Allen
- Jeff Allen
- Keenan Allen
- Ty Allert
- Jim Allison
- Joe Alt
- Lance Alworth
- Anthony Anderson
- Gary Anderson
- Ralph Anderson
- Rickey Anderson
- Stephen Anderson
- Billy Andrews
- John Andrews
- Sam Anno
- Charles Anthony
- Eli Apple
- Scott Appleton
- Antwan Applewhite
- David Archer
- Dave Atkins
- Jeremiah Attaochu
- Dan Audick

== B ==
- Bob Babich
- Martin Baccaglio
- Coy Bacon
- Michael Badgley
- Chris Bahr
- Zack Bailey
- Johnny Baker
- Melvin Baker
- Tony Baker
- Keith Baldwin
- Dave Ball
- Jason Ball
- Kalen Ballage
- Michael Bandy
- Chip Banks
- Eric Banks
- Gary Banks
- Al Bansavage
- Joe Barksdale
- Antwan Barnes
- Ernie Barnes
- Johnnie Barnes
- Larry Barnes
- Pete Barnes
- Sebastian Barrie
- Al Barry
- Essang Bassey
- Pat Batteaux
- Jackie Battle
- Tra Battle
- Hank Bauer
- Colin Baxter
- Martin Bayless
- Raymond Baylor
- Joe Beauchamp
- Doug Beaudoin
- Rogers Beckett
- Darry Beckwith
- Mekhi Becton
- Nick Becton
- Jim Beirne
- Eddie Bell
- Ricky Bell
- B. J. Bello
- George Belotti
- Jesse Bendross
- Rolf Benirschke
- Travis Benjamin
- Darren Bennett
- Fred Bennett
- Michael Bennett
- Monte Bennett
- Roy Bennett
- Mitchell Benson
- Thomas Benson
- Rod Bernstine
- Ed Berry
- Reggie Berry
- Tony Berti
- Taylor Bertolet
- Bobby Bethune
- Eric Bieniemy
- Atari Bigby
- Asmar Bilal
- Ron Billingsley
- Craig Bingham
- Ryon Bingham
- David Binn
- Bront Bird
- Steve Bird
- George Blair
- Anthony Blaylock
- Bon Boatwright
- Hubert Bobo
- Phil Bogle
- Glen Bonner
- Alfonso Boone
- Dicaprio Bootle
- Ben Bordelon
- Joey Bosa
- David Boston
- Tre Boston
- Ron Botchan
- Kevin Bouie
- Brett Boyko
- Bradley Bozeman
- Paul Bradford
- Carlos Bradley
- Chuck Bradley
- Freddie Bradley
- Darius Bradwell
- Jeff Brady
- David Brandon
- David Brandt
- John Brannon
- Hezekiah Braxton
- Carl Brazley
- Don Breaux
- Kevin Breedlove
- Drew Brees
- Brian Brennan
- Dorian Brew
- Bob Briggs
- Darrick Brilz
- Curtis Brinkley
- Dana Brinson
- Marlin Briscoe
- Jon Brittenum
- Lou Brock, Jr.
- Stan Brock
- Billy Brooks
- James Brooks
- Michael Brooks
- Cortez Broughton
- Andrew Brown
- Bob Brown
- Booker Brown
- Don Brown
- Donald Brown (born 1963)
- Donald Brown (born 1987)
- Everette Brown
- Fakhir Brown
- Gary Brown
- Jatavis Brown
- Kris Brown
- Richard Brown
- Ronnie Brown
- Vincent Brown
- Wilbert Brown
- Keith Browner
- Charlie Brueckman
- Bob Bruggers
- Willie Buchanon
- Maury Buford
- Bryan Bulaga
- Frank Buncom
- James Burgess
- John Burke
- Kevin Burnett
- Leon Burns
- Isaiah Burse
- Larry Burton
- Tyreek Burwell
- Lewis Bush
- Steve Busick
- Crezdon Butler
- Donald Butler
- Jeremy Butler
- Robb Butler
- Marion Butts
- Scott Byers
- Kenny Bynum
- Terrell Bynum
- Gill Byrd
- Jake Byrne

== C ==
- Lee Roy Caffey
- Jamaree Caldwell
- Reche Caldwell
- Bryce Callahan
- Greg Camarillo
- Jim Campbell
- Joe Campbell
- Tevaughn Campbell
- John Cappelletti
- Joe Caravello
- John Carney
- Reggie Carolan
- Ron Carpenter
- Chris Carr
- Levert Carr
- Roger Carr
- Ryan Carrethers
- Darren Carrington
- Kern Carson
- Leonardo Carson
- Robert Carswell
- DeAndre Carter
- Mike Carter
- Tyrone Carter
- Virgil Carter
- Antoine Cason
- Simeon Castille
- Luis Castillo
- Eric Castle
- Sean Cattouse
- Jacques Cesaire
- Chris Chambers
- Robert Chancey
- Scott Chandler
- Wes Chandler
- DJ Chark
- Mike Charles
- Jesse Chatman
- Tony Chickillo
- Dick Chorovich
- Cole Christiansen
- Steve Christie
- Robert Claiborne
- Sam Claphan
- Will Clapp
- Corey Clark
- Greg Clark
- Howard Clark
- Wayne Clark
- Willie Clark
- Jeromey Clary
- Bobby Clatterbuck
- John Clay
- Carey Clayton
- Kellen Clemens
- Asante Cleveland
- Doug Cline
- Bert Coan
- Joe Cocozzo
- Tay Cody
- Danny Colbert
- Lewis Colbert
- Fred Cole
- Andre Coleman (born 1972)
- Andre Coleman (born 1984)
- Ben Coleman
- Leonard Coleman
- Marco Coleman
- Jim Collins
- Junior Colson
- Tyler Conklin
- Kavell Conner
- Curtis Conway
- Jared Cook
- Travis Coons
- Stephen Cooper
- Olie Cordill
- Anthony Corley
- Frank Cornish
- Dave Costa
- Craig Cotton
- Christian Covington
- Arthur Cox
- Derek Cox
- Aaron Craver
- Patrick Crayton
- Terry Crews
- Ray Crittenden
- Antonio Cromartie
- David Croudip
- Sean Culkin
- Rodney Culver
- Jeff Cumberland
- Joe Cummings
- Pat Curran
- Markus Curry

== D ==
- Jeffery Dale
- Ken Dallafior
- Chase Daniel
- Matt Daniels
- Tony Darden
- Brian Davis
- Bruce Davis
- Chris Davis
- Craig Davis
- Derius Davis
- Geremy Davis
- Greg Davis
- Harrison Davis
- Isaac Davis
- Michael Davis
- Mike Davis
- Reggie Davis
- Reuben Davis
- Sammy Davis
- Thomas Davis
- Wayne Davis
- Wendell Davis
- Tyeler Davison
- Tom Day
- Fred Dean
- Austin Deculus
- Dick Degen
- Charles DeJurnett
- Steve DeLine
- Steve DeLong
- Ben DeLuca
- Sam DeLuca
- Chris Demaree
- Al Dennis
- Mike Dennis
- Tim Denton
- Pierre Desir
- Chuck Detwiler
- David Diaz-Infante
- Cameron Dicker
- Chuck Dicus
- Kris Dielman
- Na'il Diggs
- Curt DiGiacomo
- Charles Dimry
- Adrian Dingle
- Will Dissly
- Gerald Dixon
- J.K. Dobbins
- Tim Dobbins
- Dedrick Dodge
- Jerry Doerger
- Brandyn Dombrowski
- Marty Domres
- Ben Donnell
- Larry Dorsey
- Keelan Doss
- Elijah Dotson
- Jay Douglas
- Bobby Douglass
- Mike Douglass
- Jerome Dove
- Eric Downing
- Oscar Dragon
- Shaun Draughn
- Bobby Duckworth
- Greg Ducre
- Mike Dumas
- Frank Duncan
- Speedy Duncan
- King Dunlap
- Lenny Dunlap
- Bud Dupree
- Clarence Duren
- Tim Dwight
- Mike Dyal
- Troy Dye
- Ken Dyer
- Donald Dykes
- Nick Dzubnar

== E ==
- Quinn Early
- Ron East
- Rick Eber
- Justin Eboigbe
- Cid Edwards
- Donnie Edwards
- Glen Edwards
- Gus Edwards
- Vernon Edwards
- Emeke Egbule
- Ron Egloff
- Chuck Ehin
- Austin Ekeler
- Donnie Elder
- Bill Elko
- Emmanuel Ellerbee
- Allan Ellis
- Ed Ellis
- Kevin Ellison
- Omar Ellison
- Kyle Emanuel
- Greg Engel
- Larry English
- Hunter Enis
- Alex Erickson
- Bernie Erickson
- Tom Erlandson
- Don Estes
- Larry Evans
- Gerald Everett
- Jim Everett

== F ==
- Kyler Fackrell
- Brandon Facyson
- Earl Faison
- Dick Farley
- Andrew Farmer
- Miller Farr
- John Farris
- Kenneth Farrow
- Chuck Faucette
- Chris Faulkner
- Jermaine Fazande
- Greg Feasel
- Dan Feeney
- Breiden Fehoko
- Simi Fehoko
- Matt Feiler
- Mark Fellows
- Lane Fenner
- Gene Ferguson
- Howie Ferguson
- Keith Ferguson
- Kevin Ferguson
- Orlando Ferrante
- Clelin Ferrell
- Jim Fetherston
- Maurice Ffrench
- Carlos Fields
- Floyd Fields
- Cedric Figaro
- A. J. Finley
- Gary Finneran
- Jason Fisk
- Tucker Fisk
- Scott Fitzkee
- Dez Fitzpatrick
- James FitzPatrick
- Ed Flanagan
- Chris Fletcher
- Jamar Fletcher
- Terrell Fletcher
- Tom Flick
- Drayton Florence
- Brandon Flowers
- Charlie Flowers
- Eric Floyd
- John Floyd
- Malcom Floyd
- Victor Floyd
- D. J. Fluker
- Darren Flutie
- Doug Flutie
- Steve Foley
- Toniu Fonoti
- Albert Fontenot
- Fred Ford
- Poona Ford
- Fred Forsberg
- Roman Fortin
- Hosea Fortune
- Gene Foster
- Dan Fouts
- Morgan Fox
- Tim Fox
- Vernon Fox
- Donald Frank
- Aubrayo Franklin
- Orlando Franklin
- Wayne Frazier
- Willie Frazier
- Dwight Freeney
- Jesse Freitas
- John Friesz
- Toni Fritsch
- James Fuller
- Joe Fuller
- Mike Fuller
- William Fuller
- Kristian Fulton

== G ==
- Andrew Gachkar
- Oronde Gadsden II
- Jeff Gaffney
- Bob Gagliano
- Tony Gaiter
- Jared Gaither
- Darryl Gamble
- Chris Gambol
- Chris Gannon
- Antonio Garay
- Carwell Gardner
- Kelvin Garmon
- Bob Garner
- Scott Garnett
- Mike Garrett
- Gary Garrison
- Antonio Gates
- Gregory Gatson
- Blenda Gay
- Shaun Gayle
- Trevor Gaylor
- Joe Gaziano
- Akbar Gbaja-Biamila
- Kwame Geathers
- Roy Gerela
- Carl Gersbach
- Claude Gibson
- Dennis Gibson
- Gale Gilbert
- Marcus Gilchrist
- Fred Gillett
- Walker Gillette
- Dondre Gilliam
- Alohi Gilman
- Andrew Gissinger
- Vencie Glenn
- Gary Glick
- Art Gob
- Randall Godfrey
- Leo Goeas
- Joe Goebel
- Mike Goff
- Willard Goff
- Derrel Gofourth
- Kevin Gogan
- Tom Good
- Don Goode
- Richard Goodman
- Joey Goodspeed
- Cletis Gordon
- Darrien Gordon
- Dick Gordon
- Dwayne Gordon
- Ira Gordon
- Melvin Gordon
- Kurt Gouveia
- DeMingo Graham
- Jeff Graham
- Kenny Graham
- Tom Graham
- Dave Grannell
- Wes Grant
- David Grayson
- Ladarius Green
- Mike Green
- Tyronne Green
- Virgil Green
- Ken Greene
- Bob Gregor
- Steve Gregory
- Keith Grennan
- Jim Griffin
- David Griggs
- George Gross
- Burt Grossman
- Ryan Groy
- Sam Gruneisen
- Mike Guendling
- Keith Guthrie
- Lawrence Guy
- Gary Guyton
- Jalen Guyton

== H ==
- John Hadl
- Rex Hadnot
- Rickey Hagood
- Chris Hairston
- Courtney Hall
- Delton Hall
- Kemon Hall
- Bob Hallen
- Michael Hamilton
- Omarion Hampton
- Da'Shawn Hand
- Norman Hand
- Omari Hand
- Jim Harbaugh
- Buddy Hardaway
- Cedric Harden
- Dee Hardison
- Nick Hardwick
- Kevin Hardy
- Ronnie Harmon
- Dwayne Harper
- LaRue Harrington
- Chris Harris, Jr.
- Davontae Harris
- Derrick Harris
- Dick Harris
- James Harris
- Josh Harris
- Marques Harris
- Michael Harris
- Najee Harris
- Nigel Harris
- Tommie Harris
- Tre Harris
- Walt Harris
- Lloyd Harrison
- Rodney Harrison
- Bobby Hart
- Cam Hart
- Clinton Hart
- Frank Hartley
- Richard Harvey
- Hassan Haskins
- Jon Haskins
- Kevin Haslam
- Armon Hatcher
- Andy Hawkins
- Jaylinn Hawkins
- Lavelle Hawkins
- Aaron Hayden
- Luther Hayes
- Tom Hayes
- Casey Hayward
- Steve Heiden
- Taylor Heinicke
- Reuben Henderson
- Wyatt Henderson
- Steve Hendrickson
- David Hendrix
- John Hendy
- Daiyan Henley
- Dan Henning
- Hunter Henry
- Justin Herbert
- Javontee Herndon
- Mark Herrmann
- David Herron
- Jacob Hester
- Eric Hill
- Jim Hill
- K.J. Hill
- Ronnie Hillman
- Nyheim Hines
- George Hinkle
- Christopher Hinton
- George Hoey
- John Holecek
- Jamie Holland
- Ron Holliday
- Justin Hollins
- Robert Holmes
- Pete Holohan
- Harry Holt
- James Holt
- Mitch Hoopes
- Dustin Hopkins
- Darrel Hopper
- Bob Horn
- Don Horn
- Bob Horton
- Zander Horvath
- Kevin House, Jr.
- Bobby Houston
- Bob Howard
- Joey Howard
- Brad Hubbert
- Bill Hudson
- Dick Hudson
- Mike Hudson
- Gene Huey
- Dante Hughes
- Mike Humiston
- Deon Humphrey
- Stan Humphries
- Daniel Hunter
- Hayden Hurst
- Ken Hutcherson

== I ==
- Hank Ilesic
- Brian Ingram
- Melvin Ingram
- Dontrelle Inman

== J ==
- Bernard Jackson
- Bobby Jackson
- Donte Jackson
- Earnest Jackson
- Eddie Jackson
- Greg Jackson
- J.C. Jackson
- Jeff Jackson
- John Jackson
- Justin Jackson
- Vincent Jackson
- Jack Jacobson
- Kendyl Jacox
- Nate Jacquet
- Brenden Jaimes
- Andre James
- Derwin James
- Lionel James
- Toran James
- Quentin Jammer
- John Jefferson
- Malik Jefferson
- Shawn Jefferson
- Tony Jefferson
- Neal Jeffrey
- DeRon Jenkins
- Keyvan Jenkins
- Rayshawn Jenkins
- Ronney Jenkins
- Jim Jodat
- A. J. Johnson
- Amar Johnson
- Austin Johnson
- David Johnson
- Dontae Johnson
- Gary Johnson
- James Johnson
- Jarret Johnson
- Jaylen Johnson
- Leon Johnson
- Pete Johnson
- Raylee Johnson
- Stevie Johnson
- Travis Johnson
- Tre'Von Johnson
- Trumaine Johnson
- Tyron Johnson
- Zion Johnson
- Quentin Johnston
- Charlie Joiner
- Eric Jonassen
- Anthony Jones
- Charlie Jones
- Clinton Jones
- Curtis Jones
- Deacon Jones
- Donnie Jones
- Freddie Jones
- Harris Jones
- Jacoby Jones
- J. J. Jones
- Justin Jones
- Leroy Jones
- Naquan Jones
- Ray Jones
- Reggie Jones
- Leander Jordan
- Linval Joseph
- Sebastian Joseph-Day
- Bhawoh Jue

== K ==
- Nate Kaeding
- Hunter Kampmoyer
- Emil Karas
- Drew Kaser
- Bill Kay
- Michael Keathley
- Val Keckin
- Thomas Keiser
- Louie Kelcher
- Senio Kelemete
- Joshua Kelley
- Mike Kelley
- Jack Kemp
- Charlie Kempinska
- Eric Kendricks
- Lance Kendricks
- Kyle Kennard
- Josh Keyes
- Tyrone Keys
- John Kidd
- Terrence Kiel
- Keith Kinderman
- Howard Kindig
- David King
- Deon King
- Desmond King
- Linden King
- Randy Kirk
- Gary Kirner
- Bob Klein
- Jack Klotz
- Dave Kocourek
- John Kompara
- Younghoe Koo
- Gary Kowalski
- Erik Kramer
- Ryan Krause

== L ==
- Travis LaBoy
- Jim Lachey
- Ernie Ladd
- Aaron Laing
- Bruce Laird
- KeAndre Lambert-Smith
- Josh Lambo
- Forrest Lamp
- Trey Lance
- Chris Landrum
- Bobby Lane
- Brandon Lang
- Bob Laraba
- Jim Laslavic
- Kwamie Lassiter
- Billy Latsko
- Paul Latzke
- Babe Laufenberg
- Cordarro Law
- George Layne
- Raheem Layne
- Pete Lazetich
- Ryan Leaf
- Ben Leber
- John Lee
- Lloyd Lee
- Mike Lee
- Shawn Lee
- Doug Legursky
- Cory Lekkerkerker
- Jessie Lemonier
- Bill Lenkaitis
- Deane Leonard
- Jim Leonard
- Otis Leverette
- Jerry LeVias
- Darryll Lewis
- Dave Lewis
- Nate Lewis
- Terry Lewis
- Sammy Lilly
- Keith Lincoln
- Jeff Linkenbach
- Corey Linsley
- Sean Lissemore
- Larry Little
- Corey Liuget
- Chuck Loewen
- Mike London
- Ty Long
- Clint Longley
- Andre Lott
- Rommie Loudd
- Rick Lovato
- Paul Lowe
- Woodrow Lowe
- Dwight Lowery
- Shalom Luani
- Ed Luther
- Keith Lyle
- Lester Lyles
- Blake Lynch
- Corey Lynch

== M ==
- Don Macek
- Cedric Mack
- Khalil Mack
- John Mackey
- Jacque MacKinnon
- Craig Mager
- Paul Maguire
- Drew Mahalic
- Mark Malone
- Terrell Manning
- Brandon Manumaleuna
- Mark Markovich
- Dean Marlowe
- Frank Wayne Marsh
- Richard Marshall
- Trey Marshall
- Blanche Martin
- David Martin
- Larry Martin
- Tony Martin
- Vaughn Martin
- Eugene Marve
- Ricardo Mathews
- Ryan Mathews
- Bruce Mathison
- Scott Matlock
- Archie Matsos
- Bo Matthews
- Grant Mattos
- Carl Mauck
- Deems May
- Mark May
- Marcus Maye
- Jerry Mays
- Joe Mays
- Cole Mazza
- Mat McBriar
- Chris McCain
- Ron McCall
- Keenan McCardell
- Le'Ron McClain
- Robert McClain
- Bill McClard
- Skip McClendon
- Dexter McCluster
- Dexter McCoil
- Ladd McConkey
- Phil McConkey
- Lloyd McCoy
- Fred McCrary
- Greg McCrary
- Marlon McCree
- Dwight McDonald
- Gerry McDougall
- Craig McEwen
- Jordan McFadden
- Scott McGarrahan
- Buford McGee
- Carl McGee
- Willie McGee
- T. Y. McGill
- Sean McGrath
- Damion McIntosh
- Raleigh McKenzie
- Brandon McKinney
- Tre' McKitty
- Dennis McKnight
- Chase McLaughlin
- Jim McMahon
- Randy McMichael
- Charlie McNeil
- Ryan McNeil
- Marcus McNeill
- Miles McPherson
- Robert Meachem
- Natrone Means
- Brandon Mebane
- Quenton Meeks
- Mario Mendez
- Mike Mercer
- Forrest Merrill
- Shawne Merriman
- Eric Metcalf
- Larry Mialik
- Sony Michel
- Bobby Micho
- Darren Mickell
- R. J. Mickens
- Joe Mickles
- Frank Middleton
- Rick Middleton
- Ron Middleton
- Pete Mikolajewski
- Glyn Milburn
- Joe Milinichik
- John Milks
- Anthony Miller
- Brett Miller
- Doug Miller
- Kyle Miller
- Les Miller
- Pat Miller
- Paul Miller
- Hanik Milligan
- Jeff Mills
- Jim Mills
- Chris Mims
- Ed Mitchell
- Lydell Mitchell
- Shannon Mitchell
- Robert Mitinger
- Ron Mix
- David Moa
- Tim Moffett
- Mike Mohring
- Ralf Mojsiejenko
- Alex Molden
- Elijah Molden
- David Molk
- Tony Moll
- Mike Montgomery
- Mark Montreuil
- Mike Mooney
- Brandon Moore
- Fred Moore
- Jason Moore
- Mack Moore
- Moses Moreno
- Zeke Moreno
- Mercury Morris
- Wayne Morris
- Roland Moss
- Eric Moten
- Jonas Mouton
- Scott Mruczkowski
- Calvin Muhammad
- Chuck Muncie
- Bill Munson
- Caleb Murphy
- Kevin Murphy
- Kenneth Murray
- Tanner Muse
- Sam Mustipher
- Chip Myrtle

== N ==
- Legedu Naanee
- Gabe Nabers
- Ikechuku Ndukwe
- Lorenzo Neal
- Ryan Neill
- Darrin Nelson
- Derrie Nelson
- Kyle Nelson
- Reggie Nelson
- Ron Nery
- Rick Neuheisel
- Jeremy Newberry
- Steve Newell
- Detrez Newsome
- Nick Niemann
- Doyle Nix
- Dennis Norman
- Josh Norman
- Pettis Norman
- Trusse Norris
- Don Norton
- Storm Norton
- Nick Novak
- Gary Nowak
- Ogemdi Nwagbuo
- Uchenna Nwosu

== O ==
- Ronnie O'Bard
- Roman Oben
- Cyril Obiozor
- Amen Ogbongbemiga
- Otito Ogbonnia
- Rich Ohrnberger
- Tony Okanlawon
- Russell Okung
- Michael Ola
- Cliff Olander
- Shane Olivea
- Branden Oliver
- Paul Oliver
- Igor Olshansky
- Leslie O'Neal
- James Onwualu
- Bo Orlando
- Terry Orr
- Vince Osby
- Kassim Osgood
- Matt Overton
- Odafe Oweh
- Artie Owens
- Joe Owens
- Terry Owens

== P ==
- Solomon Page
- Tenny Palepoi
- Josh Palmer
- Donald Parham
- Ernie Park
- Andy Parker
- Eric Parker
- Vaughn Parker
- Billy Parks
- John Parrella
- Gary Parris
- Dennis Partee
- Rick Partridge
- Johnny Patrick
- Joel Patten
- Elvis Patterson
- Jaret Patterson
- Darrell Pattillo
- Andre Patton
- Harold Paul
- Chris Peace
- Justin Peelle
- Erric Pegram
- Chris Penn
- Trevor Penning
- Ralph Perretta
- Jason Perry
- Joshua Perry
- Scott Perry
- Denzel Perryman
- Volney Peters
- Bob Petrich
- Duane Pettitt
- Todd Philcox
- Adrian Phillips
- Del'Shawn Phillips
- Irvin Phillips
- Joe Phillips
- John Phillips
- Shaun Phillips
- Darius Philon
- Andrew Pinnock
- Trey Pipkins
- Jerrell Pippens
- Austen Pleasants
- Gary Plummer
- Dave Plump
- Sherman Plunkett
- Carlos Polk
- Robert Pollard
- Marquez Pope
- Troymaine Pope
- Jack Porter
- Dickie Post
- Mike Pouncey
- Jeff Powell
- Ray Preston
- Marcus Price
- Shawn Price
- Stacy Price
- Mike Pringley
- Bob Print
- Joe Prokop
- Jack Protz
- Hayes Pullard
- Spencer Pulley
- Alfred Pupunu

== Q ==
- Shaquille Quarterman
- Jeff Queen
- Scott Quessenberry

== R ==
- Marc Raab
- Latario Rachal
- Eddie Ray
- Cory Raymer
- Dave Rayner
- Jalen Reagor
- Barry Redden
- Kevin Reddick
- Rick Redman
- Joe Reed
- Nikko Reed
- Robert Reed
- Trovon Reed
- Troy Reeder
- Don Reese
- John Reeves
- Walter Reeves
- Caraun Reid
- Mike Remmers
- Larry Rentz
- Fuad Reveiz
- Kendall Reyes
- Benny Ricardo
- Andy Rice
- Brenden Rice
- Floyd Rice
- Stanley Richard
- David Richards
- Jeff Richards
- Wade Richey
- Mikhael Ricks
- Houston Ridge
- Chad Rinehart
- Philip Rivers
- Bo Roberson
- Andre Roberts
- George Roberts
- Adrian Robinson
- Derreck Robinson
- Fred Robinson
- Gerald Robinson
- Jerry Robinson
- Patrick Robinson
- Trevor Robinson
- Brian Roche
- Isaac Rochell
- Jim Rockford
- Mark Rodenhauser
- Johnny Rodgers
- Richard Rodgers
- Don Rogers
- Mel Rogers
- Sam Rogers
- Henry Rolling
- Tag Rome
- Charles Romes
- Dan Rosado
- Dante Rosario
- Nick Rose
- Brandian Ross
- Kevin Ross
- Micah Ross
- Tim Rossovich
- Tobin Rote
- Raleigh Roundtree
- Larry Rountree
- Curtis Rouse
- Dave Rowe
- Eddie Royal
- Orlando Ruff
- Chris Rumph
- Jon Runyan
- Bob Rush
- Reggie Rusk
- Booker Russell
- Leonard Russell

== S ==
- Joe Salave'a
- Sean Salisbury
- Bryant Salter
- Jamaree Salyer
- Asante Samuel Jr.
- Chris Samuels
- Davis Sanchez
- Bob Sanders
- Patrick Sapp
- Foster Sarell
- Dan Sartin
- Martin Sartin
- Don Sasa
- Tony Savage
- Ron Sayers
- Damik Scafe
- Dwight Scales
- Sam Scarber
- Bob Scarpitto
- Stephen Schilling
- Maury Schleicher
- Jim Schmedding
- Henry Schmidt
- Michael Schofield
- Scott Schwedes
- Mike Scifres
- DeQuincy Scott
- Ian Scott
- JK Scott
- Kevin Scott
- Trent Scott
- Sam Seale
- Bill Searcey
- Jimmy Sears
- Junior Seau
- Mark Seay
- Gene Selawski
- Dewey Selmon
- David Sharpe
- Bobby Shaw
- Pete Shaw
- Terrance Shaw
- Pat Shea
- Ty Shelby
- Anthony Shelton
- L. J. Shelton
- Laviska Shenault Jr.
- Billy Shields
- Troy Sienkiewicz
- Eric Sievers
- Brandon Siler
- Tracy Simien
- King Simmons
- Tony Simmons
- Antoine Simpson
- Wes Sims
- Ron Singleton
- Jeremiah Sirles
- Jim Skow
- Mark Slater
- Rashawn Slater
- Webster Slaughter
- Matt Slauson
- Emil Slovacek
- Stone Smartt
- Billy Ray Smith Jr.
- Charlie Smith
- Dave Smith
- Derek Smith
- Dreamius Smith
- Elliot Smith
- Geno Smith
- Johnny Ray Smith
- Lucious Smith
- Neil Smith
- Ron Smith (born 1943)
- Ron Smith (born 1956)
- Russ Smith
- Ryan Smith
- Sherman Smith
- Willie Smith
- Raymond Smoot
- Angelo Snipes
- Cal Snowden
- Matt Sokol
- Dick Speights
- Jimmy Spencer
- Tim Spencer
- Todd Spencer
- Kory Sperry
- Takeo Spikes
- Isaiah Spiller
- C. J. Spillman
- Darren Sproles
- Micheal Spurlock
- Damion Square
- Benjamin St-Juste
- Tyree St. Louis
- John Stadnik
- Jeff Staggs
- Walter Stanley
- Anthony Steels
- Bob Stein
- Tremayne Stephens
- Kay Stephenson
- Wayne Stewart
- Easton Stick
- Bryan Still
- Tarheeb Still
- Bryan Stoltenberg
- Mike Stratton
- Donald Strickland
- Hal Stringert
- Art Strozier
- Wilbur Strozier
- Darrell Stuckey
- Caleb Sturgis
- John Sullivan
- Kent Sullivan
- Harry Swayne
- Walt Sweeney
- Joe Sweet
- Michael Swift
- John Sykes

== T ==
- John Tanner
- Maa Tanuvasa
- Teair Tart
- Franklin Tate
- Aaron Taylor
- Brandon Taylor
- Branson Taylor
- Ja'Sir Taylor
- Jesse Taylor
- Johnny Taylor
- Ken Taylor
- Kitrick Taylor
- Sammie Taylor
- Shannon Taylor
- Tyrod Taylor
- Quinton Teal
- Roderic Teamer
- John Teerlinck
- Steve Tensi
- Manti Te'o
- Adam Terry
- Sam Tevi
- Galand Thaxton
- Jim Thaxton
- Ryan Thelwell
- Yancey Thigpen
- Bob Thomas (born 1948)
- Bob Thomas (born 1952)
- Cam Thomas
- Cornell Thomas
- Jesse Thomas
- Jewerl Thomas
- Johnny Thomas
- Kiondre Thomas
- Lee Thomas
- Mike Thomas
- Aundra Thompson
- Broderick Thompson
- Tom Thompson
- George Thornton
- Cliff Thrift
- Jerry Tillery
- Dave Tipton
- Jim Tolbert
- Mike Tolbert
- Billy Joe Tolliver
- Cameron Tom
- Eric Tomlinson
- LaDainian Tomlinson
- Cole Toner
- Korey Toomer
- Tom Toth
- Steve Tovar
- Drue Tranquill
- Richard Trapp
- Herb Travenio
- John Travis
- Johnnie Troutman
- Jyles Tucker
- Phil Tuckett
- Van Tuinei
- Peter Tuipulotu
- Tuli Tuipulotu
- John Turner
- Michael Turner
- Nate Turner
- Scott Turner
- Trai Turner
- Derrek Tuszka
- James Tuthill
- Maurice Tyler

== U ==
- Rich Umphrey
- Johnny Unitas
- Mitch Unrein
- Terry Unrein
- Darryl Usher

== V ==
- Courtney Van Buren
- Sean Vanhorse
- Nick Vannett
- Kyle Van Noy
- Tamarick Vanover
- Dick Van Raaphorst
- Louis Vasquez
- Cassius Vaughn
- Jason Verrett
- Brian Vertefeuille
- Kimani Vidal
- Nick Vigil
- Tristan Vizcaino
- Mark Vlasic
- Billy Volek

== W ==
- Bryan Wagner
- Mark Walczak
- Derrick Walker
- Jeff Walker
- Reggie Walker
- Wayne Walker
- C. J. Wallace
- Henry Wallace
- Ron Waller
- Bryan Walters
- Danny Walters
- J. D. Walton
- Timmie Ware
- Jimmy Warren
- Joe Washington
- Kelley Washington
- Russ Washington
- Anthony Waters
- Jaylen Watkins
- Pat Watkins
- Chris Watt
- Derek Watt
- Ted Watts
- Marlowe Wax
- Jimmy Webb
- Mark Webb
- Eric Weddle
- Wes Welker
- Bob Wells
- Reggie Wells
- Ralph Wenzel
- Ray Wersching
- Jeff West
- Dick Westmoreland
- Griff Whalen
- Dwight Wheeler
- Craig Whelihan
- Andre White
- Ed White
- Kyzir White
- Lee White
- Ray White
- Reggie White
- Bud Whitehead
- Charlie Whitehurst
- Curtis Whitley
- Josh Whitman
- Nat Whitmyer
- Fozzy Whittaker
- Kenny Wiggins
- Mike Wilcher
- Marcellus Wiley
- Matt Wilhelm
- Doug Wilkerson
- Al Williams
- Andre Williams
- Clarence Williams
- Dave Williams
- Demorrio Williams
- Eric Williams
- Gerome Williams
- Henry Williams
- Jamal Williams
- Jeff Williams
- Jerrol Williams
- Kerwynn Williams
- Lee Williams
- Lester Williams
- Marcus Williams
- Mike Williams (born 1953)
- Mike Williams (born 1994)
- Nick Williams
- Sam Williams
- Sammy Williams
- Steve Williams
- Sylvester Williams
- Tom Williams
- Tourek Williams
- Trayveon Williams
- Trevor Williams
- Tyrell Williams
- Kendall Williamson
- Earl Wilson
- Jerry Wilson
- Jimmy Wilson
- Karl Wilson
- Kion Wilson
- Kris Wilson
- Kyle Wilson
- Walter Wilson
- Mike Windt
- Kellen Winslow
- Blaise Winter
- Cal Withrow
- Cory Withrow
- Gregory Wojcik
- Royce Womble
- Dick Wood
- Mike Wood
- Ken Woodard
- John Woodcock
- Danny Woodhead
- Don Woods
- JT Woods
- Ernie Wright
- Shareece Wright
- Kevin Wyatt
- Jarius Wynn

== Y ==
- Andre Young
- Duane Young
- Glen Young
- Lonnie Young
- Rickey Young
- Wilbur Young

== Z ==
- Ken Zachary
- Mike Zandofsky
- Bob Zeman
