= 1966 San Diego Chargers season =

NFL team season

- Owner: Eugene V. Klein
- General manager: Sid Gillman
- Head coach: Sid Gillman
- Home stadium: Balboa Stadium

Results
- Record: 7–6–1
- Division place: 3rd Western Division
- Playoffs: Did not qualify
- All-AFL: 4: FL Lance Alworth (1st team); CB/KR Speedy Duncan (2nd team); S Kenny Graham (1st team); T Ron Mix (1st team)
- AFL All-Stars: 6: FL Lance Alworth; CB/KR Speedy Duncan; TE Jacque MacKinnon; T Ron Mix; G Walt Sweeney; K Dick Van Raaphorst

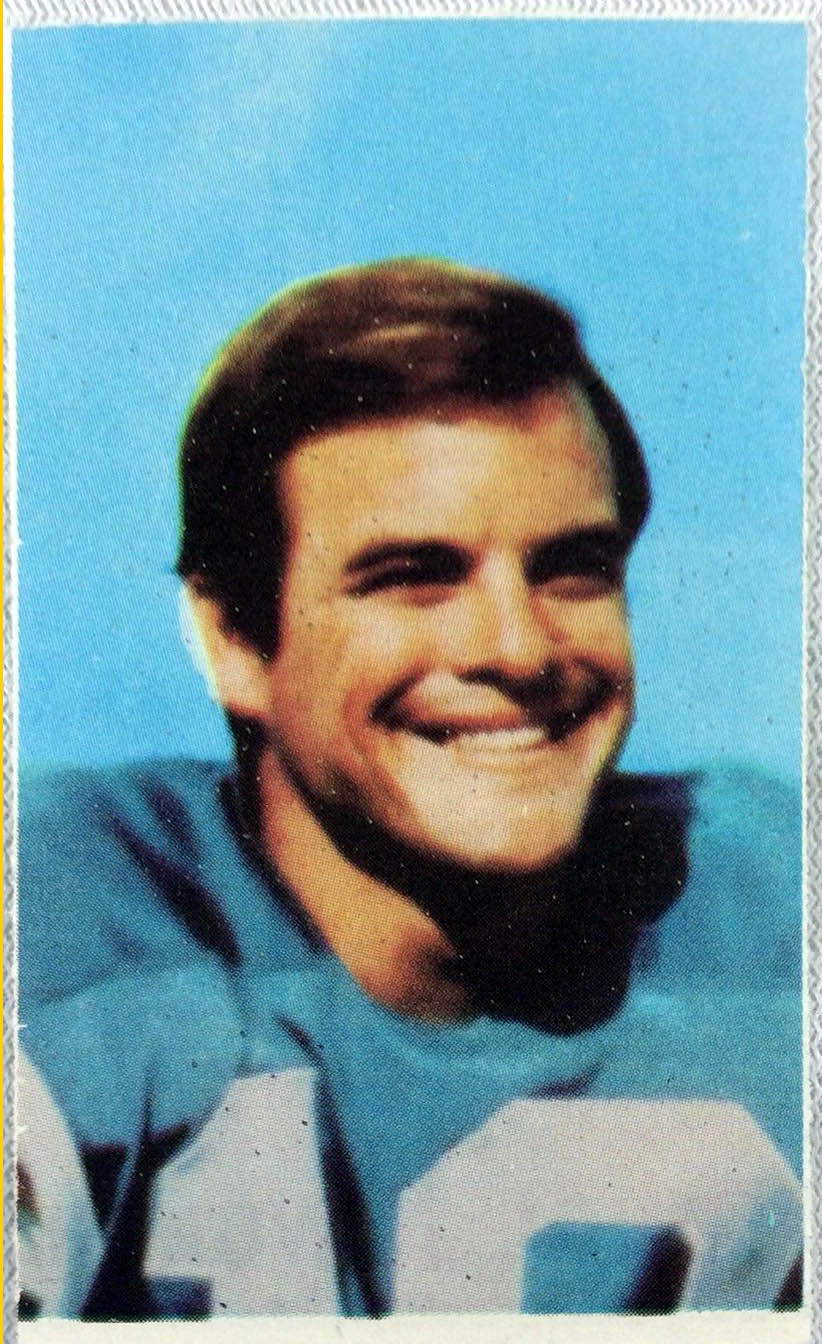
Lance Alworth led the American Football League in receptions, receiving yards and receiving touchdowns in 1966.

The 1966 season was the 7th season for the San Diego Chargers as a professional American Football League (AFL) franchise; the team failed to improve on their 9–2–3 record from 1965. In the team's final season at Balboa Stadium, the Chargers went 7–6–1 and finished in third place in the AFL West Division. They would move to San Diego Stadium for the following season. It was the first season to feature an AFL-NFL World Championship Game, now known as the Super Bowl. San Diego began the season among the favorites to represent the AFL in the historic game, but faded after a 4–0 start, winning only three more times in the remaining ten games.

Flanker Lance Alworth was the Chargers' main offensive threat. Catching passes from quarterback John Hadl, he achieved the AFL's triple crown by leading the league in receptions, receiving yards and receiving touchdowns. The Chargers' offense shifted its focus towards the pass, with running back Paul Lowe, the AFL's rushing champion the previous season, seeing far fewer carries in 1966. On defense, the Chargers lost assistant coach Chuck Noll and tackle Ernie Ladd during the offseason, while end Earl Faison left during the regular season. They were strong against the pass, with cornerback Speedy Duncan and safety Kenny Graham making twelve interceptions between them, but became the AFL's worst team against the run.

== Offseason ==
=== AFL draft ===
==== Regular draft ====
The 1966 AFL draft took place on November 27, 1965, late in the previous season. The rival National Football League (NFL) conducted its draft on the same day. Where the same player was drafted by both AFL and NFL franchises, the two would compete to sign him. San Diego struggled to sign their highest selections, with their top six (and seven of their first eight) signing for NFL clubs. One of these, running back Russ Smith, was cut by the Atlanta Falcons on 6 July 1966, and joined the Chargers afterwards, spending a year on the taxi squad before scoring 10 touchdowns over the following four seasons. 7th-round pick Jim Tolbert stayed with the team for six seasons, and returned briefly at the end of his 11-year NFL career; he played in over 100 games in the Chargers' defensive backfield, starting over 50 of them.

San Diego found a long-term starter in the later rounds in offensive tackle Terry Owens. Chosen in the 11th round, he was primarily a backup in his first two seasons, but won a starting role in 1968 and kept it until injuries forced his retirement in 1975, having made over 100 starts in total. In the 13th round, the Chargers selected defensive lineman Houston Ridge. A regular starter during two of his four seasons in San Diego, Ridge would later sue the Chargers, winning $300,000 after successfully arguing that the organization's drug culture had caused the injury that ended his career.

1966 San Diego Chargers draft
| Round | Pick | Player | Position | College | Notes |
|---|---|---|---|---|---|
| 1 | 7 | Don Davis | Defensive tackle | Los Angeles State | 25th pick in NFL draft; signed by New York Giants |
| 2 | 16 | Nick Rassas | Defensive back | Notre Dame | 17th pick in NFL draft; signed by Atlanta Falcons |
| 3 | 24 | Milt Morin * | Tight end | UMass | 14th pick in NFL draft; signed by Cleveland Browns |
| 4 | 32 | Charlie Brown | Defensive back | Syracuse | 28th pick in NFL draft; signed by Chicago Bears |
| 5 | 40 | Russ Smith | Running back | Miami (FL) | Signed and cut by Falcons before joining Chargers |
| 6 | 49 | Gary Pettigrew | Defensive tackle | Stanford | 20th pick in NFL draft; signed by Philadelphia Eagles |
| 7 | 61 | Jim Tolbert | Defensive back | Lincoln (MO) | |
| 8 | 72 | Doug Buffone | Linebacker | Louisville | 60th pick in NFL draft; signed by Chicago Bears |
| 9 | 81 | Taft Reed | Defensive back | Jackson State | 279th pick in NFL draft |
| 10 | 90 | Dan Pride | Linebacker | Jackson State | 201st pick in NFL draft |
| 11 | 99 | Terry Owens | Tackle | Jacksonville State | 167th pick in NFL draft |
| 12 | 108 | Ray Jones | Halfback | Los Angeles State | Signed by Toronto Argonauts (CFL) |
| 13 | 117 | Houston Ridge | Defensive end | San Diego State | |
| 14 | 126 | Mike London | Linebacker | Wisconsin | |
| 15 | 135 | Shelly Novack | End | Long Beach State | |
| 16 | 144 | Bill Scott | Defensive back | Idaho | Signed by Toronto Argonauts (CFL) |
| 17 | 153 | Ron Ogle | Defensive tackle | Long Beach State | |
| 18 | 162 | John Travis | Fullback | San Jose State | |
| 19 | 171 | Jerome Bell | End | Central State (OK) | |
| 20 | 180 | Bill McDowell | Linebacker | Florida State | |
Made roster * Made at least one AFL All-Star game or NFL Pro Bowl during career Played in the NFL in 1966

==== Redshirt draft ====
As well as their regular collegiate draft, the AFL also held a separate redshirt draft. This covered players whose graduation had been delayed by taking a redshirt year, meaning that they still had a further year of college football eligibility. Three of these would play for the Chargers, with linebacker Jeff Staggs and running back Brad Hubbert joining the team in 1967, while defensive back Joe Beauchamp skipped his final year of college eligibility and played for the Chargers in 1966. It was the first of ten seasons in San Diego for Beauchamp, who eventually started 97 games, intercepting 23 passes and returning three of them for touchdowns.

Unless noted otherwise, these players began their professional careers in 1967.

1966 San Diego Chargers redshirt draft
| Round | Pick | Player | Position | College | Notes |
|---|---|---|---|---|---|
| 1 | 8 | Bob Windsor | Tight end | Kentucky | 26th pick in NFL draft; signed by San Francisco 49ers |
| 2 | 17 | Diron Talbert * | Defensive tackle | Texas | 66th pick in NFL draft; signed by Los Angeles Rams |
| 3 | 26 | Jeff Staggs | Linebacker | San Diego State | 2nd pick in 1967 NFL Redshirt draft |
| 4 | 35 | LaVerle Pratt | Linebacker | Idaho | 210th pick in NFL draft |
| 5 | 44 | Rhome Nixon | End | Southern | 6th pick in 1967 NFL Redshirt draft; signed by Orange County Ramblers (COFL) |
| 6 | 53 | Joe Beauchamp | Defensive back | Iowa State | Joined the Chargers in 1966 |
| 7 | 62 | Saint Saffold | Split end | San Jose State | 222nd pick in NFL draft |
| 8 | 71 | Brad Hubbert * | Running back | Arizona | 3rd pick in 1967 NFL redshirt draft |
| 9 | 79 | Wayne Page | Defensive back | Clemson | 182nd pick in NFL draft |
| 10 | 89 | Wayne Becker | Tackle | Montana | 197th pick in NFL draft; signed by Eugene Bombers (COFL) |
| 11 | 97 | Hugh Wright | Fullback | Adams State | 223rd pick in NFL draft |
Made roster * Made at least one AFL All-Star game or NFL Pro Bowl during career Played in the NFL in 1967

=== Undrafted free agents ===
1966 undrafted free agents of note
| Player | Position | College |
|---|---|---|
| Chuck Cowart | Linebacker | California Western |
| John Smedley | Safety | Cincinnati |

=== Departures and arrivals ===
The Chargers lost two 1965 AFL All-Pros in defensive tackle Ernie Ladd and defensive end Earl Faison; the pair had been named 1st-team All-Pros three and four times respectively during their five years in San Diego, but had expressed dissatisfaction with head coach Sid Gillman in his joint role of general manager early the previous season. They had played out the final year of their contracts in 1965, making clear their intention to leave afterwards, and were traded to the Houston Oilers on January 15 in exchange for three defensive players. (Note: Defensive end Gary Cutsinger, linebacker Johnny Baker and defensive back Pete Jaquess.) Four days later, AFL commissioner Joe Foss nullified the trade after finding the Oilers guilty of tampering with the players, whose Chargers contracts would not expire until May 1. Ladd eventually signed with the Oilers as a free agent on June 7; Faison re-signed with the Chargers on July 29, but Gillman waived him when he struggled with injuries, commenting that Faison had, "a long way to go to become average, much less outstanding." The expansion Miami Dolphins signed Faison on October 19.

Other defensive departures included Dick Westmoreland, a cornerback who had finished runner-up for the AFL's rookie of the year award in 1963 and led the team in interceptions in 1964, being voted a 2nd-team All-Pro both times. After struggling with a broken arm in 1965, he was left unprotected by the Chargers in an expansion draft, and claimed by the Dolphins. Another defensive back, Dick Harris, retired from professional football. One of the original Chargers from 1960, Harris had made 29 interceptions over his career while being named twice each to the 1st and 2nd All-Pro teams.

Tight end Dave Kocourek was another original Charger to depart; he was allowed to go to Miami in the expansion draft after making four All-Pro 2nd teams and four AFL All-Star games with San Diego. The Chargers gained a replacement tight end when new AFL commissioner Al Davis awarded them Houston's Willie Frazier as compensation for the loss of Ladd. (Note: They were also awarded Pete Jaquess, but he was released before the season began.) Frazier had been voted to the All-Star game once as an Oiler and would be twice more as a Charger, in 1967 and 1969. San Diego made a change of specialist kickers, releasing Herb Travenio and giving the job to Dick Van Raaphorst.

San Diego's coaching staff lost a future Hall of Fame coach when defensive backfield coach Chuck Noll took the same role with the NFL's Baltimore Colts. Noll had been on the Chargers staff since their first season.

=== Change of ownership ===
The Chargers had their first change of majority ownership on August 25 when hotel chain heir Barron Hilton, who had owned the franchise since their formation in 1959, sold controlling shares to a consortium led by National General Corporation chairman Gene Klein. With a price of $10 million, the purchase set a new record for a professional football team. Hilton had announced his plans to sell the team the previous year, as he wanted to spend more time operating the hotel chain that he co-owned with his father Conrad Hilton. This had prompted speculation that the team may move, but Klein stated that they would remain in San Diego.

Klein's consortium included former White House Press Secretary Pierre Salinger and General Motors executive John DeLorean. The Hiltons remained as minority shareholders with a combined 30% ownership. Klein agreed to the record-breaking price as he anticipated that a forthcoming merger of the AFL with the more-established NFL would significantly increase the value of the Chargers.

== Personnel ==
=== Staff ===
1966 San Diego Chargers staff
| Front office: Owner – Gene Klein; General manager – Sid Gillman; Director of player personnel - Al LoCasale; Publicity director - Jerry Wynn; Business manager - John Gough; Head coaches: Head coach – Sid Gillman; Offensive coaches: Offensive backfield coach – Charlie Waller; Offensive line coach – Joe Madro | Defensive coaches: Defensive line coach – Walt Hackett; Defensive backfield coach – Tom Bass; Strength and conditioning: Strength coach - Alvin Roy |

=== Roster ===
1966 San Diego Chargers roster
| Quarterbacks (QB): 13 Steve Tensi; 15 Dan Henning; 21 John Hadl; Running backs (RB): 22 Keith Lincoln; 23 Paul Lowe; 32 Jim Allison; 37 Gene Foster; Wide receivers (WR): 19 Lance Alworth; 27 Gary Garrison; 81 Dave Plump; 88 Don Norton; Tight ends (TE): 38 Jacque MacKinnon; 83 Willie Frazier | Offensive linemen (OL): 60 Ed Mitchell G; 62 John Farris G; 65 Sam Gruneisen C; 68 Don Estes G; 72 Gary Kirner T; 74 Ron Mix T; 76 Terry Owens T; 78 Walt Sweeney G; Defensive linemen (DL): 56 Steve DeLong DT; 59 Howard Kindig DE; 73 Larry Martin DT; 77 Jim Griffin DT/DE; 79 George Gross DT; 85 Bob Petrich DE | Linebackers (LB): 51 Dick Degen MLB; 55 Frank Buncom OLB; 58 Doug Cline OLB; 66 Rick Redman OLB/P; 67 Archie Matsos MLB; 80 Houston Ridge OLB; Defensive backs (DB): 20 Miller Farr CB; 34 Bob Zeman FS; 41 Nat Whitmyer CB; 43 Jim Tolbert SS; 45 Speedy Duncan CB; 47 Bud Whitehead FS; Special teams (ST): 39 Dick Van Raaphorst K | Practice squad: 40 Joe Beauchamp CB; 54 Tom Good LB; 52 Paul Latzke C; 61 John Milks LB; -- Russ Smith RB; -- Sammie Taylor WR; 44 John Travis RB; Reserve: -- Bobby Asmond G (IR); 33 Kenny Graham S (IR); 50 Chuck Allen LB (IR); 58 Emil Karas LB Retired; 82 Robert Mitinger LB (Military); 71 Fred Moore DT (IR); 64 Pat Shea G (IR); 75 Ernie Wright T (IR); Rookies in italics |

== Preseason ==
San Diego opened their exhibition schedule against the expansion Dolphins and took a quick 24–0 lead through interception-return touchdowns by Kenny Graham and Nat Whitmyer, together with Lance Alworth's 47-yard catch from running back Keith Lincoln. Further touchdowns followed in the second half on a John Hadl pass to Jacque MacKinnon and a short Jim Allison run. Against Oakland, Alworth's 89-yard touchdown catch tied the next game at 7–7 but those were the only Chargers points; the Raiders won the game with a touchdown in the final minute.

The Chargers next faced Kansas City in Anaheim; it was the second part of the first professional football double-header, directly following a Raiders-Patriots exhibition in the same stadium. Hadl ran for two touchdowns and passed for another, but San Diego lost 31–21. They returned home for their finale, defeating the Patriots with 24 unanswered second-half points. Hadl rushed for another touchdown, and his backup Steve Tensi passed to Don Norton for another. Speedy Duncan (on a 63-yard punt return) and Gene Foster also scored as the Chargers pulled away. The attendance of 11,894 was the smallest for a Chargers game since they moved to San Diego in 1961.

| Week | Date | Opponent | Result | Record | Venue | Attendance |
|---|---|---|---|---|---|---|
| 1 | August 6 | Miami Dolphins | W 38–10 | 1–0 | Balboa Stadium | 25,712 |
| 2 | August 13 | Oakland Raiders | L 7–14 | 1–1 | Balboa Stadium | 17,904 |
| 3 | August 20 | vs. Kansas City Chiefs | L 21–31 | 1–2 | Anaheim Stadium, (Anaheim) | 36,038 |
| 4 | August 27 | Boston Patriots | W 31–13 | 2–2 | Balboa Stadium | 11,894 |

== Regular season ==
=== Summary ===
San Diego, the winners of five division titles in the previous six seasons, were considered a contender to represent the AFL at Super Bowl I—a preseason poll of 27 UPI football journalists slightly favored the Kansas City Chiefs to win the West division, with twelve first-place votes to the Chargers' nine. San Diego opened by winning a rematch of the previous year's title game with the Buffalo Bills and reached a record of 4–0 while outscoring their opponents by a combined 124–37. After losing their fifth game by a single point, San Diego were unable to recapture their early-season form, going only 3–6–1 from that game onwards and finishing third in their division. Gillman stated that a reason for the Chargers' struggles was Hilton's reluctance to spend money signing their draftees away from NFL teams.

The Chargers' offense had ranked first in both points scored and yards per game the previous year, but slipped to third and fifth in the nine-team AFL in 1966. They did commit the fewest turnovers in the league with 22, nine better than any other team. Hadl again featured as quarterback in every game; his backup Tensi started twice, but was soon benched for Hadl both times. Hadl was second-best among starters for passing yards, touchdowns and interceptions. Alworth was again the outstanding receiver, winning the receiving triple crown by leading the AFL in receptions (73), receiving yards (1,383) and receiving touchdowns (13). He was supported by the rookie Garrison (642 yards, 4 touchdowns), and six-year veteran tight end MacKinnon who saw increased usage with Kocourek having been traded, scoring six times. Running back Paul Lowe had won the league rushing title the previous year, but was used far more sporadically and ranked only seventh with 643 yards. As a team, the Chargers' average yards per carry of 4.3 was the second-best in the league, but they had the fewest attempts with barely 25 per game.

San Diego's defense was unbalanced, as they ranked second against the pass for yards per game but last against the run for yardage, touchdowns and yards per carry. Opposing offenses exploited this weakness, with 497 rushing plays being called against the Chargers during the season; no other team was run against more than 441 times. Defensive tackle George Gross was unofficially (Note: Professional football leagues did not keep sack statistics officially until the NFL began to do so in 1982. Members of the Professional Football Researchers Association have largely reconstructed sack data from 1960 onwards based on official gamebooks, but the NFL does not acknowledge pre-1982 sack numbers.) credited with a team-high 4 quarterback sacks; the team as a whole had fewer sacks in the absence of Ladd and Faison, slipping from 38 the previous season to 26 in 1966. Duncan led the team with 7 interceptions, while Graham had 5. Duncan was also the Chargers' main kick returner, ranking second in the AFL with 13.2 yards per punt return and third with 25.7 yards per kickoff return. Van Raaphorst converted 51.6% of his field goal (16 of 31), fourth in the league and slightly worse than Trevenio's 60% from the previous season. Linebacker Rick Redman took over the punting duties after sharing the role with Hadl the previous year, but his 37-yards per attempt was the league's worse among players with at least 40 punts.

=== Schedule ===
| Week | Date | Opponent | Result | Record | Venue | Attendance | Recap |
|---|---|---|---|---|---|---|---|
| 1 | September 4 | Buffalo Bills | **W** 27–7 | 1–0 | Balboa Stadium | 27,572 | Recap |
| 2 | September 10 | Boston Patriots | **W** 24–0 | 2–0 | Balboa Stadium | 29,539 | Recap |
| 3 | Bye | | | | | | |
| 4 | September 25 | at **Oakland Raiders** | **W** 29–20 | 3–0 | Oakland–Alameda County Coliseum | 37,183 | Recap |
| 5 | October 2 | Miami Dolphins | **W** 44–10 | 4–0 | Balboa Stadium | 26,444 | Recap |
| 6 | October 8 | at New York Jets | **L** 16–17 | 4–1 | Shea Stadium | 63,497 | Recap |
| 7 | October 16 | at Buffalo Bills | **T** 17–17 | 4–1–1 | War Memorial Stadium | 45,169 | Recap |
| 8 | October 23 | at Boston Patriots | **L** 17–35 | 4–2–1 | Fenway Park | 32,371 | Recap |
| 9 | October 30 | **Denver Broncos** | **W** 24–17 | 5–2–1 | Balboa Stadium | 25,819 | Recap |
| 10 | November 6 | at **Kansas City Chiefs** | **L** 14–24 | 5–3–1 | Municipal Stadium | 40,986 | Recap |
| 11 | November 13 | **Oakland Raiders** | **L** 19–41 | 5–4–1 | Balboa Stadium | 26,230 | Recap |
| 12 | Bye | | | | | | |
| 13 | November 27 | at **Denver Broncos** | **L** 17–20 | 5–5–1 | Bears Stadium | 24,860 | Recap |
| 14 | December 4 | at Houston Oilers | **W** 28–22 | 6–5–1 | Rice Stadium | 17,569 | Recap |
| 15 | December 11 | New York Jets | **W** 42–27 | 7–5–1 | Balboa Stadium | 25,712 | Recap |
| 16 | December 18 | **Kansas City Chiefs** | **L** 17–27 | 7–6–1 | Balboa Stadium | 28,548 | Recap |
Note: Intra-division opponents are in **bold** text.

=== Game summaries ===
==== Week 1: vs. Buffalo Bills ====
Week One: Buffalo Bills at San Diego Chargers – Game summary

| Quarter | 1 | 2 | 3 | 4 | Total |
|---|---|---|---|---|---|
| Bills | 0 | 0 | 0 | 7 | **7** |
| **Chargers** | 0 | 7 | 3 | 17 | **27** |

at Balboa Stadium, San Diego, California

- Date: September 4
- Game time: 1:38 p.m. PDT
- Game weather: 70 °F (21.1 °C), relative humidity 82%, wind 7 mph
- Game attendance: 27,572
- Referee: Bob Finley
- Box score

Game information

**First quarter**

- No scoring plays.

**Second quarter**

- SDG – Lance Alworth 7-yard pass from John Hadl (Dick Van Raaphorst kick), 14:50. Chargers 7–0. **Drive: 10 plays, 73 yards.**

**Third quarter**

- SDG – Dick Van Raaphorst 30-yard field goal, 5:53. Chargers 10–0. **Drive: 14 plays, 50 yards.**

**Fourth quarter**

- SDG – Dick Van Raaphorst 10-yard field goal, 14:58. Chargers 13–0. **Drive: 7 plays, 44 yards.**
- SDG – Jacque MacKinnon 3-yard pass from John Hadl (Dick Van Raaphorst kick), 5:22. Chargers 20–0. **Drive: 4 plays, 31 yards.**
- SDG – Speedy Duncan 81-yard punt return (Dick Van Raaphorst kick), 4:05. Chargers 27–0.
- BUF – Bobby Burnett 2-yard rush (Booth Lusteg kick), 1:27. Chargers 27–7. **Drive: 8 plays, 78 yards.**

**Top passers**

- BUF – Daryle Lamonica – 5/7, 76 yards
- SDG – John Hadl – 14/18, 160 yards, 2 TD

**Top rushers**

- BUF – Wray Carlton – 16 rushes, 87 yards
- SDG – Gene Foster – 12 rushes, 58 yards

**Top receivers**

- BUF – Charley Ferguson – 3 receptions, 77 yards
- SDG – Jacque MacKinnon – 2 receptions, 56 yards, TD

In a rematch of the 1964 and 1965 AFL title games, Buffalo drove into Charger territory on their first two drives, but were foiled by a deflected field goal attempt and a Graham interception. After the second of these, San Diego converted three 3rd downs, including a 3rd and 5, 7-yard touchdown catch by Alworth. A succession of punts followed before Buffalo missed another field goal shortly before halftime, leaving the Chargers 7–0 ahead.

San Diego opened the 3rd quarter with a nine-minute drive that featured a 4th and inches conversion by Foster and culminated in Van Raaphorst's first field goal. Miller Farr intercepted Jack Kemp three plays later, leading to another Van Raaphorst success to open the final quarter. Buffalo drove into Chargers territory before Kemp was intercepted again, with Bud Whitehead returning the ball 61 yards to the Bills' 31-yard line. That led to Hadl's second touchdown pass, again on 3rd down, and Duncan wove through would-be tackler on an 81-yard punt return touchdown shortly afterwards. The Chargers were close to a shutout, but Buffalo converted a late 4th and 8 before scoring their only points on the following play.

The Charger defense allowed Kemp, a former Charger, only 4 completions on 20 attempts for 74 yards and with 3 interceptions, and a 2.9 passer rating compared to 140.7 from Hadl.

==== Week 2: vs. Boston Patriots ====
Week Two: Boston Patriots at San Diego Chargers – Game summary

| Quarter | 1 | 2 | 3 | 4 | Total |
|---|---|---|---|---|---|
| Patriots | 0 | 0 | 0 | 0 | **0** |
| **Chargers** | 3 | 14 | 0 | 7 | **24** |

at Balboa Stadium, San Diego, California

- Date: September 10
- Game time: 8:05 p.m. PDT
- Game weather: 69 °F (20.6 °C), relative humidity 81%, wind 9 mph
- Game attendance: 29,539
- Referee: Jack West
- Box score

Game information

**First quarter**

- SDG – Dick Van Raaphorst 10-yard field goal, 2:06. Chargers 3–0. **Drive: 9 plays, 74 yards.**

**Second quarter**

- SDG – Kenny Graham 32-yard interception return (Dick Van Raaphorst kick), 2:20. Chargers 10–0.
- SDG – Lance Alworth 5-yard pass from John Hadl (Dick Van Raaphorst kick), 0:15. Chargers 17–0. **Drive: 4 plays, 56 yards.**

**Third quarter**

- No scoring plays.

**Fourth quarter**

- SDG – Jim Allison 61-yard rush (Dick Van Raaphorst kick), 6:02. Chargers 24–0. **Drive: 5 plays, 75 yards.**

**Top passers**

- BOS – Babe Parilli – 13/39, 137 yards, 4 INT
- SDG – John Hadl – 10/28, 155 yards, TD

**Top rushers**

- BOS – Jim Nance – 12 rushes, 68 yards
- SDG – Jim Allison – 3 rushes, 64 yards, TD

**Top receivers**

- BOS – Jim Nance – 4 receptions, 67 yards
- SDG – Lance Alworth – 5 receptions, 97 yards, TD

A 37-yard catch by Alworth set up Van Raaphorst's short field goal late in the opening quarter. He had a chance to double the lead in the 2nd quarter, but missed wide right from 40 yards out. After an exchange of punts, Graham intercepted an underthrown Babe Parilli pass and returned it 32 yards for a touchdown with 2:20 left in the half. That left enough time for the Chargers to score again, as their defense forced a three-and-out before three Hadl completions covered 56 yards, with Alworth catching the last of these to make it 17–0 at halftime.

Boston, who had failed to cross the halfway line until the final play of the half, began making chances after the break. Gino Cappelletti missed a 45-yard field goal attempt, then four consecutive drive penetrated the Chargers 30; Chuck Allen, Farr and Whitehead stopped the first three with interceptions, while the fourth ended with an incompletion on 4th and 1. Five plays later, Allison went around right end and broke several tackles en route to the 61-yard touchdown that finished the scoring.

The Charger defense allowed 252 yards while forcing four turnovers. They achieved the franchise's first shutout since Week 12, 1963.

==== Week 4: at Oakland Raiders ====
Week Four: San Diego Chargers at Oakland Raiders – Game summary

| Quarter | 1 | 2 | 3 | 4 | Total |
|---|---|---|---|---|---|
| **Chargers** | 3 | 9 | 10 | 7 | **29** |
| Raiders | 3 | 0 | 7 | 10 | **20** |

at Oakland-Alameda County Coliseum, Oakland, California

- Date: September 25
- Game weather: 64 °F (17.8 °C), relative humidity 80%, wind 12 mph
- Game attendance: 37,183
- Box score

Game information

**First quarter**

- SDG – Dick Van Raaphorst 13-yard field goal, 5:34. Chargers 3–0. **Drive: 7 plays, 24 yards.**
- OAK – Mike Eischeid 49-yard field goal, 1:25. Tied 3–3. **Drive: 6 plays, 33 yards.**

**Second quarter**

- SDG – Safety, ball snapped out of end zone, 11:08. Chargers 5–3.
- SDG – John Hadl 1-yard run (Dick Van Raaphorst kick), 5:28. Chargers 12–3. **Drive: 11 plays, 55 yards.**

**Third quarter**

- OAK – Clem Daniels 1-yard run (Mike Eischeid kick), 12:45. Chargers 12–10. **Drive: 5 plays, 80 yards.**
- SDG – Jacque MacKinnon 19-yard pass from John Hadl (Dick Van Raaphorst kick), 11:16. Chargers 19–10. **Drive: 4 plays, 72 yards.**
- SDG – Dick Van Raaphorst 20-yard field goal, 7:49. Chargers 22–10. **Drive: 7 plays, 17 yards.**

**Fourth quarter**

- OAK – Fred Biletnikoff 8-yard pass from Tom Flores (Mike Eischeid kick), 11:57. Chargers 22–17. **Drive: 8 plays, 65 yards.**
- OAK – Mike Eischeid 44-yard field goal, 6:45. Chargers 22–20. **Drive: 5 plays, 25 yards.**
- SDG – Gene Foster 8-yard run (Dick Van Raaphorst kick), 4:12. Chargers 29–20. **Drive: 3 plays, 68 yards.**

**Top passers**

- SDG – John Hadl – 10/20, 162 yards, TD, INT
- OAK – Cotton Davidson – 5/14, 96 yards, INT

**Top rushers**

- SDG – John Hadl – 4 rushes, 39 yards, TD
- OAK – Clem Daniels – 17 rushes, 49 yards, TD

**Top receivers**

- SDG – Lance Alworth – 2 receptions, 50 yards
- OAK – Clem Daniels – 3 receptions, 54 yards

Duncan set up the Chargers' first points with an interception of Cotton Davidson and 31-yard return into Oakland territory. The Raiders tied the score on the following drive, then put San Diego back ahead with a special teams error; on 4th and 8 from their own 11, their center snapped the ball over the punter's head and out of the end zone for a safety. After the ensuing free kick, Hadl converted a 3rd and 10 with a 16-yard pass to Garrison, and scored himself from a yard out. Duncan intercepted another Davidson pass after Oakland had reached the San Diego 42, and the Chargers led 12–3 at the interval.

On the first drive of the second half, Whitehead was flagged for a 35-yard defensive pass interference penalty that moved the ball to the 2-yard line and led to a Raiders touchdown on the following play. Hadl connected with Lincoln for 45 yards on the next play from scrimmage, then restored San Diego's nine-point lead with a 19-yard touchdown pass to MacKinnon on 3rd and 16. Duncan intercepted Davidson for the third time, setting up a Van Raaphorst field goal and causing Oakland to switch quarterbacks; Tom Flores entered the game and was soon intercepted by Redman, though Hadl was intercepted in return. Flores threw a touchdown early in the final quarter, and Oakland added a field goal after declining to go for it on 4th and 1. With their lead cut to 22–20, San Diego responded with a 3-play, 68-yard touchdown drive; Alworth had a 43-yard catch despite double coverage, Lowe went around right end for 17 yards and Foster went around left end for 8 yards and the touchdown. Flores was sacked on 4th down to ensure the Chargers' win.

Duncan tied a franchise record, becoming the fifth Charger to achieve three interceptions in a game. The two Raiders quarterbacks combined to complete 11 of 31 passes for 191 yards, with a touchdown and four interceptions.

==== Week 5: vs. Miami Dolphins ====
Week Five: Miami Dolphins at San Diego Chargers – Game summary

| Quarter | 1 | 2 | 3 | 4 | Total |
|---|---|---|---|---|---|
| Dolphins | 3 | 7 | 0 | 0 | **10** |
| **Chargers** | 0 | 6 | 10 | 28 | **44** |

at Balboa Stadium, San Diego, California

- Date: October 2
- Game time: 1:36 p.m. PDT
- Game weather: 71 °F (21.7 °C), relative humidity 76%, wind 9 mph
- Game attendance: 26,444
- Referee: Ben Dreith
- Box score

Game information

**First quarter**

- MIA – Gene Mingo 27-yard field goal, 13:56. Dolphins 3–0. **Drive: 4 plays, 0 yards.**

**Second quarter**

- MIA – Karl Noonan 20-yard pass from Dick Wood (Gene Mingo kick), 8:41. Dolphins 10–0. **Drive: 6 plays, 55 yards.**
- SDG – Rick Redman 58-yard fumble return (kick blocked), 0:44. Dolphins 10–6.

**Third quarter**

- SDG – Dick Van Raaphorst 9-yard field goal, 7:45. Dolphins 10–9. **Drive: 10 plays, 38 yards.**
- SDG – Gene Foster 25-yard pass from Steve Tensi (Dick Van Raaphorst kick), 2:14. Chargers 16–10. **Drive: 7 plays, 76 yards.**

**Fourth quarter**

- SDG – Lance Alworth 44-yard pass from Steve Tensi (Dick Van Raaphorst kick), 14:11. Chargers 23–10. **Drive: 1 play, 44 yards.**
- SDG – Gene Foster 63-yard pass from Steve Tensi (Dick Van Raaphorst kick), 8:18. Chargers 30–10. **Drive: 1 play, 63 yards.**
- SDG – Lance Alworth 36-yard pass from Keith Lincoln (Dick Van Raaphorst kick), 6:33. Chargers 37–10. **Drive: 2 plays, 33 yards.**
- SDG – Willie Frazier 30-yard pass from Steve Tensi (Dick Van Raaphorst kick), 1:54. Chargers 44–10. **Drive: 5 plays, 42 yards.**

**Top passers**

- MIA – Dick Wood – 7/22, 84 yards, TD
- SDG – Steve Tensi – 9/12, 223 yards, 4 TD

**Top rushers**

- MIA – Rick Casares – 22 rushes, 80 yards
- SDG – Paul Lowe – 10 rushes, 26 yards

**Top receivers**

- MIA – Karl Noonan – 2 receptions, 30 yards, TD
- SDG – Gene Foster – 6 receptions, 134 yards, 2 TD

San Diego faced the expansion Dolphins for the first time. Miami took a 10–0 lead in the 2nd quarter, scoring after a Lowe fumble and a Hadl interception, while the Chargers drove no further than midfield throughout the first half. Instead, their defense scored; Miami had a 2nd and 3 at the Chargers 35 when Steve DeLong forced a fumble that Redman caught in mid-air before racing clear to cut the deficit to 10–6 at halftime.

Tensi replaced Hadl for the second half; he attempted only two passes in his first drive, which stalled at the goal line and resulted in a chip shot field goal. He followed this up with his first touchdown pass as a professional, 25 yards to Foster for the lead. Early in the final period, Allison recovered a muffed punt at the Dolphins 44 and Tensi found Alworth behind the defense on the next play for another touchdown. After Buncom blocked a Dolphins field goal attempt, Tensi again struck on the next play, this time finding Foster for his second touchdown. When Lincoln threw to Alworth on a trick play, it was the Chargers' third touchdown in four offensive plays, and Tensi combined with Frazier two minutes left to complete the scoring.

Tensi's 12 pass attempts were the first of his career, and his passer rating of 156.2 would remain his best. Hadl completed 6 of 11 for 62 yards and an interception. San Diego had two 100-yard receivers: Foster (6 for 134, 2 touchdowns) and Alworth (6 for 119, 2 touchdowns).

==== Week 6: at New York Jets ====
Week Six: San Diego Chargers at New York Jets – Game summary

| Quarter | 1 | 2 | 3 | 4 | Total |
|---|---|---|---|---|---|
| Chargers | 3 | 6 | 0 | 7 | **16** |
| **Jets** | 7 | 3 | 0 | 7 | **17** |

at Shea Stadium, New York, New York

- Date: October 8
- Game weather: 62 °F (16.7 °C), relative humidity 48%, wind 13 mph
- Game attendance: 63,497
- Box score

Game information

**First quarter**

- SDG – Dick Van Raaphorst 14-yard field goal, 6:19. Chargers 3–0. **Drive: 9 plays, 73 yards.**
- NYJ – Matt Snell 27-yard pass from Joe Namath (Jim Turner kick), 0:43. Jets 7–3. **Drive: 5 plays, 42 yards.**

**Second quarter**

- SDG – Dick Van Raaphorst 17-yard field goal, 11:20. Jets 7–6. **Drive: 5 plays, 63 yards.**
- NYJ – Jim Turner 33-yard field goal, 1:10. Jets 10–6. **Drive: 8 plays, 69 yards.**
- SDG – Dick Van Raaphorst 42-yard field goal, 0:01. Jets 10–9. **Drive: 7 plays, 45 yards.**

**Third quarter**

- No scoring plays.

**Fourth quarter**

- SDG – Keith Lincoln 67-yard pass from John Hadl (Dick Van Raaphorst kick), 9:09. Chargers 16–10. **Drive: 4 plays, 47 yards.**
- NYJ – Emerson Boozer 8-yard run (Jim Turner kick), 6:23. Jets 17–16. **Drive: 5 plays, 66 yards.**

**Top passers**

- SDG – John Hadl – 22/41, 331 yards, TD
- NYJ – Joe Namath – 11/22, 129 yards, TD, 3 INT

**Top rushers**

- SDG – Gene Foster – 5 rushes, 42 yards
- NYJ – Matt Snell – 18 rushes, 78 yards

**Top receivers**

- SDG – Lance Alworth – 10 receptions, 149 yards
- NYJ – Bill Mathis – 4 receptions, 66 yards

Tensi was given the start after his impressive performance the previous week, and set up the first Van Raaphorst field goal with a 32-yard pass to MacKinnon. He failed to complete any of his five passes on the next drive, finishing with an interception that set up the Jets at the San Diego 42; they scored five plays later, and Hadl came in for the rest of the game. Graham intercepted Joe Namath early in the 2nd quarter, leading to a field goal. After New York made a field goal of their own with 1:10 left in the half, Hadl completed 4 of 6 passes for 45 yards, positioning Van Raaphorst for the 42-yard kick that made it 10–9 at the break.

Van Raaphorst attempted a field goal from around midfield on the first drive of the 3rd quarter, but it was partially blocked. Three plays later, Farr's interception and 35-yard return set the Chargers up at the New York 26. San Diego reached 3rd and goal at the 8, were pushed back 36 yards by a pair of offensive holding penalties and regained 12 yards through a Hadl run, then Van Raaphorst was wide right from 40 yards out. In the final quarter, Duncan intercepted Namath at the New York 47. San Diego picked up a first down at the 36, then were driven back by a 19-yard holding call on Gary Kirner and a 12-yard sack of Hadl. Facing 2nd and 41, Hadl threw a screen pass to Lincoln, who benefitted from blocks by Walt Sweeney, Ron Mix, Allison and Garrison en route to a 67-yard touchdown. Namath came back with a 44-yard completion on the next play, and Emerson Boozer soon restored the Jets' lead. A 30-yard catch-and-run by Garrison gave Van Raaphorst another chance, but he had another kick partially blocked, this time from 30 yards out with 2:32 to play. New York gained one first down before punting, leaving Hadl at his own 19 with 1:27 to play and a single timeout to work with. He opened with three consecutive completions to Alworth, covering 31, 15 and 7 yards. A 14-yard pass to Garrison set Van Raaphorst up for one more attempt, which he missed wide right from 21 yards with 25 seconds to play.

Van Raaphorst made his first three field goals, but missed his next four. The seven total attempts remain a Charger record as of 2023. Tensi completed 2 of 10 passes for 45 yards and an interception, with a passer rating of 6.2. San Diego lost despite clear advantages in takeaways (3–1), yards of offense (445–248) and first downs gained (23–12).

==== Week 7: at Buffalo Bills ====
Week Seven: San Diego Chargers at Buffalo Bills – Game summary

| Quarter | 1 | 2 | 3 | 4 | Total |
|---|---|---|---|---|---|
| Chargers | 7 | 10 | 0 | 0 | **17** |
| Bills | 0 | 3 | 7 | 7 | **17** |

at War Memorial Stadium, Buffalo, New York

- Date: October 16
- Game time: 1:00 p.m. PDT
- Game weather: 51 °F (10.6 °C), relative humidity 81%, wind 23 mph
- Game attendance: 45,169
- Box score

Game information

**First quarter**

- SDG – Willie Frazier 6-yard pass from John Hadl (Dick Van Raaphorst kick), 1:05. Chargers 7–0. **Drive: 16 plays, 95 yards.**

**Second quarter**

- SDG – Dick Van Raaphorst 31-yard field goal, 1:53. Chargers 10–0. **Drive: 7 plays, 57 yards.**
- SDG – Keith Lincoln 21-yard pass from John Hadl (Dick Van Raaphorst kick), 0:35. Chargers 17–0. **Drive: 4 plays, 63 yards.**
- BUF – Booth Lusteg 41-yard field goal, 0:02. Chargers 17–3. **Drive: 3 plays, 29 yards.**

**Third quarter**

- BUF – Bobby Burnett 3-yard pass from Daryle Lamonica (Booth Lusteg kick), 4:13. Chargers 17–10. **Drive: 4 plays, 4 yards.**

**Fourth quarter**

- BUF – Daryle Lamonica 1-yard run (Booth Lusteg kick), 4:47. Tied 17–17. **Drive: 4 plays, 61 yards.**

**Top passers**

- SDG – John Hadl – 11/20, 185 yards, 2 TD
- BUF – Jack Kemp – 6/18, 75 yards, 2 INT

**Top rushers**

- SDG – Paul Lowe – 15 rushes, 33 yards
- BUF – Bobby Burnett – 27 rushes, 138 yards

**Top receivers**

- SDG – Keith Lincoln – 5 receptions, 123 yards, TD
- BUF – Paul Costa – 2 receptions, 42 yards

Buffalo reached a 3rd and 4 at the Chargers 29 on the opening possession, but Graham intercepted Kemp at the San Diego 5. The Chargers converted four 3rd down on their ensuing 95-yard touchdown drive, three by Lincoln, including a 32-yard catch on 3rd and 19. That moved the ball to the Buffalo 12, and Frazier's touchdown catch followed three plays later. The Bills had field goal attempts on their next two drives, but Booth Lusteg missed them both. A 35-yard Alworth catch then positioned Van Raaphorst for a success from 31 yards out. After Buffalo went three-and-out, Lincoln had catches of 42 and 21 yards, the latter for a touchdown 35 seconds before halftime; the Bills quickly responded with Lusteg's 41-yard kick, but still trailed 17–3.

Howard Kindig intercepted Kemp at the San Diego 13 in the 3rd quarter. Redman had to punt from inside his own end zone after Hadl was sacked at the 1, and his punt was returned all the way to the Chargers 4; Daryle Lamonica replaced Kemp and threw a touchdown on 4th and goal from the 3. Van Raaphorst had a chance to add to the lead early in the final quarter, but was short from 42 yards. Following an exchange of punts, Buffalo were aided by a 28-yard pass interference call on Duncan en route to Lamonica's game-tying quarterback sneak. The Chargers went three-and-out and Buffalo moved into position for a game-winning field goal, but Lustig was off target from 23 yards with little time remaining.

San Diego were outgained by 320 yards to 219, but had the only takeaways of the game with the interceptions of Kemp.

==== Week 8: at Boston Patriots ====
Week Eight: San Diego Chargers at Boston Patriots – Game summary

| Quarter | 1 | 2 | 3 | 4 | Total |
|---|---|---|---|---|---|
| Chargers | 7 | 3 | 7 | 0 | **17** |
| **Patriots** | 0 | 14 | 7 | 14 | **35** |

at Fenway Park, Boston, Massachusetts

- Date: October 23
- Game weather: 58 °F (14.4 °C), relative humidity 71%, wind 12 mph
- Game attendance: 32,371
- Box score

Game information

**First quarter**

- SDG – Lance Alworth 43-yard pass from John Hadl (Dick Van Raaphorst kick), 9:15. Chargers 7–0. **Drive: 10 plays, 89 yards.**

**Second quarter**

- BOS – Larry Garron 53-yard pass from Babe Parilli (Gino Cappelletti kick), 11:58. Tied 7–7. **Drive: 7 plays, 80 yards.**
- BOS – Gino Cappelletti 15-yard pass from Babe Parilli (Gino Cappelletti kick), 4:30. Patriots 14–7. **Drive: 9 plays, 77 yards.**
- SDG – Dick Van Raaphorst 43-yard field goal, 2:28. Patriots 14–10. **Drive: 5 plays, 43 yards.**

**Third quarter**

- SDG – Lance Alworth 66-yard pass from John Hadl (Dick Van Raaphorst kick), 5:18. Chargers 17–14. **Drive: 1 play, 66 yards.**
- BOS – Larry Garron 2-yard run (Gino Cappelletti kick), 0:56. Patriots 21–17. **Drive: 2 plays, 3 yards.**

**Fourth quarter**

- BOS – Larry Garron 53-yard pass from Babe Parilli (Gino Cappelletti kick), 13:59. Patriots 28–17. **Drive: 1 play, 53 yards.**
- BOS – Jim Nance 2-yard run (Gino Cappelletti kick), 6:18. Patriots 35–17. **Drive: 4 plays, 19 yards.**

**Top passers**

- SDG – John Hadl – 19/36, 289 yards, 2 TD, 2 INT
- BOS – Babe Parilli – 13/22, 250 yards, 3 TD, INT

**Top rushers**

- SDG – Paul Lowe – 9 rushes, 25 yards
- BOS – Jim Nance – 25 rushes, 108 yards, TD

**Top receivers**

- SDG – Lance Alworth – 6 receptions, 177 yards, 2 TD
- BOS – Larry Garron – 2 receptions, 106 yards, 2 TD

Beauchamp fumbled the opening kickoff, but Gross recovered a fumble at the Chargers 11-yard line two plays later. San Diego advanced to a 3rd and 4 from the Boston 42-yard line, from where Alworth took a screen pass all the way in for a touchdown. Gross gave the Chargers a chance to extend their lead when he recovered a second fumble at the Boston 37, but Van Raaphorst eventually missed a 25-yard kick. The Patriots then drove 80 yards the other way, with Babe Parilli converting a 3rd and 18 the play before his first touchdown pass. On the following Boston drive, Parilli converted a 3rd and 9 and again followed up immediately by throwing for a touchdown. Alworth's 36-yard catch on the next play from scrimmage set up a success from 43 yards for Van Raaphorst, and a Dick Degen interception in Chargers territory kept the deficit at 14–10 entering halftime.

Midway through the 3rd quarter, Alworth got behind the defense for a 66-yard go-ahead touchdown, before San Diego's defense forced a punt. Three plays later, Hadl had a pass intercepted by Ron Hall and returned 34 yards to the Chargers' 3. Boston went ahead to stay after two further plays, and Parilli extended the lead with a 53-yard touchdown on their next play from scrimmage. The Chargers reached midfield midway through the final quarter, but Hadl was intercepted again, setting up the clinching Patriots touchdown.

As well as his two fumble recoveries, Gross was credited with nine solo tackles and five assists. With his 177 receiving yards, plus a 3-yard run, Alworth accounted for over half of San Diego's 329 offensive yards.

==== Week 9: vs. Denver Broncos ====
Week Nine: Denver Broncos at San Diego Chargers – Game summary

| Quarter | 1 | 2 | 3 | 4 | Total |
|---|---|---|---|---|---|
| Broncos | 7 | 10 | 0 | 0 | **17** |
| **Chargers** | 7 | 14 | 0 | 3 | **24** |

at Balboa Stadium, San Diego, California

- Date: October 30
- Game time: 1:37 p.m. PST
- Game weather: 64 °F (17.8 °C), relative humidity 79%, wind 10 mph
- Game attendance: 25,819
- Referee: John McDonough
- Box score

Game information

**First quarter**

- DEN – Max Choboian 2-yard run (Gary Kroner kick), 7:31. Broncos 7–0. **Drive: 10 plays, 37 yards.**
- SDG – Keith Lincoln 5-yard run (Dick Van Raaphorst kick), 3:15. Tied 7–7. **Drive: 7 plays, 78 yards.**

**Second quarter**

- DEN – Bob Scarpitto 63-yard run (Gary Kroner kick), 11:39. Broncos 14–7. **Drive: 4 plays, 71 yards.**
- SDG – Gary Garrison 1-yard pass from John Hadl (Dick Van Raaphorst kick), 2:46. Tied 14–14. **Drive: 9 plays, 61 yards.**
- DEN – Gary Kroner 23-yard field goal, 0:55. Broncos 17–14. **Drive: 9 plays, 53 yards.**
- SDG – Jacque MacKinnon 1-yard pass from John Hadl (Dick Van Raaphorst kick), 0:10. Chargers 21–17. **Drive: 5 plays, 40 yards.**

**Third quarter**

- No scoring plays.

**Fourth quarter**

- SDG – Dick Van Raaphorst 26-yard field goal, 9:27. Chargers 24–17. **Drive: 10 plays, 55 yards.**

**Top passers**

- DEN – John McCormick – 9/18, 91 yards
- SDG – John Hadl – 19/26, 180 yards, 2 TD

**Top rushers**

- DEN – Bob Scarpitto – 2 rushes, 73 yards, TD
- SDG – Keith Lincoln – 17 rushes, 95 yards, TD

**Top receivers**

- DEN – Al Denson – 3 receptions, 39 yards
- SDG – Gary Garrison – 6 receptions, 73 yards, TD

Foster fumbled in his own territory four plays into the game and Denver drove for a touchdown, converting a 4th and inches en route. Foster came back with a 37-yard run and a 19-yard catch on the next drive, which ended with Lincoln's touchdown run. The Broncos retook the lead in the 2nd quarter when Bob Scarpitto ran 63 yards on a fake punt. Van Raaphorst missed a 31-yard kick on the following drive, but the Charger defense forced a punt that Duncan returned 37 yards to the Denver 39. San Diego reached a 4th and 2 at the Broncos 9, which Hadl converted with an 8-yard pass to McKinnon. Garrison's touchdown catch followed on 3rd and goal. Denver regained the lead with a field goal 55 seconds before halftime. Lowe's 54-yard kickoff return set up the Chargers at the Denver 40 and led to a quick response: Hadl found Alworth for 11 yards and McKinnon for 28, there were two runs for no gain, then another completion to McKinnon covered the final yard with 10 seconds on the clock, putting San Diego up 21–17.

Lincoln fumbled at the end of a 23-yard run early in the 3rd quarter, with Denver recovering at their own 19. The Broncos soon faced a 4th and 7, but Scarpitto again ran for a first down on a fake punt. The Broncos reached 4th and goal at the 4, where they again went for it, with Bob Petrich stopping a run for the loss of 2 yards. Van Raaphorst converted a 26-yard field goal with nine minutes to play, and Denver had only one more possession after that. They reached 4th and 14 at the San Diego 23 and tried a fake field goal with a pass that the Chargers stopped for a loss of 2 yards. A pair of 3rd down conversion catches by Garrison enabled the Chargers to run out the clock.

Lincoln's 95 rushing yards represented the only time he ran for more than 24 yards all season, and his touchdown was his last as a Charger.

==== Week 10: at Kansas City Chiefs ====
Week Ten: San Diego Chargers at Kansas City Chiefs – Game summary

| Quarter | 1 | 2 | 3 | 4 | Total |
|---|---|---|---|---|---|
| Chargers | 7 | 0 | 7 | 0 | **14** |
| **Chiefs** | 7 | 17 | 0 | 0 | **24** |

at Municipal Stadium, Kansas City, Missouri

- Date: November 6
- Game time: 1:37 p.m. CST
- Game weather: 48 °F (8.9 °C), relative humidity 85%, wind 12 mph
- Game attendance: 40,986
- Box score

Game information

**First quarter**

- KAN – Bert Coan 1-yard run (Mike Mercer kick), 6:27. Chiefs 7–0. **Drive: 14 plays, 89 yards.**
- SDG – Lance Alworth 46-yard pass from John Hadl (Dick Van Raaphorst kick), 2:33. Tied 7–7. **Drive: 8 plays, 76 yards.**

**Second quarter**

- KAN – Otis Taylor 47-yard pass from Len Dawson (Mike Mercer kick), 5:13. Chiefs 14–7. **Drive: 9 plays, 80 yards.**
- KAN – Mike Mercer 50-yard field goal, 1:26. Chiefs 17–7. **Drive: 8 plays, 24 yards.**
- KAN – Chris Burford 10-yard pass from Len Dawson (Mike Mercer kick), 0:44. Chiefs 24–7. **Drive: 1 play, 10 yards.**

**Third quarter**

- SDG – Lance Alworth 7-yard pass from John Hadl (Dick Van Raaphorst kick), 8:32. Chiefs 24–14. **Drive: 8 plays, 43 yards.**

**Fourth quarter**

- No scoring plays.

**Top passers**

- SDG – John Hadl – 17/31, 230 yards, 2 TD, 2 INT
- KAN – Len Dawson – 12/24, 153 yards, 2 TD, 2 INT

**Top rushers**

- SDG – Gene Foster – 8 rushes, 54 yards
- KAN – Curtis McClinton – 23 rushes, 90 yards

**Top receivers**

- SDG – Lance Alworth – 6 receptions, 101 yards, 2 TD
- KAN – Chris Burford – 5 receptions, 77 yards, 1 TD

First place in the AFL West division was at stake in this game, with the Chiefs entering with a 6–2 record, half a game ahead of the Chargers. Kansas City punted from their own 11 on their first possession, but a roughing the punter penalty prolonged the drive, which resulted in a touchdown after a further eleven plays. San Diego tied the score in response. Alworth converted a 3rd and 7 with a 3-yard catch, then went deep over the middle on a 3rd and 11 from the Kansas City 46, catching Hadl's pass near the 5 and scoring. Duncan intercepted Len Dawson in Chargers territory on the following drive, but Kansas City forced a punt and drove 80 yards for a touchdown. The Chiefs added a field goal on their next drive, then a Hadl interception led to Dawson's second touchdown a play later. The half ended with Alworth making a 27-yard catch, but being tackled at the Kansas City 7, leaving the Chiefs 24–7 ahead.

Kindig and Redman combined to stop the Chiefs short on a 4th and inches early in the 3rd quarter, turning the ball over at the Kansas City 43. Hadl converted two 3rd downs with completions to MacKinnon and Alworth, the latter for a touchdown. San Diego threatened to pull closer on their next drive as Garrison's 22-yard catch on a 3rd and 23 brought them to the Chiefs 37, but Hadl's 4th-down pass fell incomplete. Midway through the final quarter, the Chiefs reached a 3rd and goal at San Diego 6 before John Milks intercepted Dawson. A 46-yard catch by MacKinnon took the Chargers across midfield, but they were pushed back by a penalty and a sack. They punted on 4th and 29, and Kansas City saw the remainder of the game out without difficulty.

==== Week 11: vs. Oakland Raiders ====
Week Eleven: Oakland Raiders at San Diego Chargers – Game summary

| Quarter | 1 | 2 | 3 | 4 | Total |
|---|---|---|---|---|---|
| **Raiders** | 7 | 21 | 7 | 6 | **41** |
| Chargers | 10 | 0 | 3 | 6 | **19** |

at Balboa Stadium, San Diego, California

- Date: November 13
- Game time: 1:34 p.m. PST
- Game weather: 60 °F (15.6 °C), relative humidity 87%, wind 7 mph
- Game attendance: 26,230
- Referee: John McDonald
- Box score

Game information

**First quarter**

- OAK – Art Powell 8-yard pass from Tom Flores (Mike Eischeid kick), 12:03. Raiders 7–0. **Drive: 5 plays, 78 yards.**
- SDG – Gary Garrison 2-yard pass from John Hadl (Dick Van Raaphorst kick), 8:19. Tied 7–7. **Drive: 7 plays, 78 yards.**
- SDG – Dick Van Raaphorst 38-yard field goal, 2:47. Chargers 10–7. **Drive: 6 plays, 20 yards.**

**Second quarter**

- OAK – Art Powell 1-yard pass from Tom Flores (Mike Eischeid kick), 12:51. Raiders 14–10. **Drive: 9 plays, 74 yards.**
- OAK – Hewritt Dixon 3-yard run (Mike Eischeid kick), 5:52. Raiders 21–10. **Drive: 10 plays, 80 yards.**
- OAK – Clem Daniels 2-yard pass from Tom Flores (Mike Eischeid kick), 2:43. Raiders 28–10. **Drive: 8 plays, 45 yards.**

**Third quarter**

- SDG – Dick Van Raaphorst 38-yard field goal, 9:45. Raiders 28–13. **Drive: 10 plays, 33 yards.**
- OAK – Hewritt Dixon 2-yard run (Mike Eischeid kick), 0:48. Raiders 35–13. **Drive: 4 plays, 78 yards.**

**Fourth quarter**

- OAK – Mike Eischeid 22-yard field goal, 12:57. Raiders 38–13. **Drive: 4 plays, 5 yards.**
- OAK – Mike Eischeid 23-yard field goal, 7:48. Raiders 41–13. **Drive: 7 plays, 60 yards.**
- SDG – Jacque MacKinnon 34-yard pass from Steve Tensi (pass failed), 0:05. Raiders 41–19. **Drive: 4 plays, 62 yards.**

**Top passers**

- OAK – Tom Flores – 14/29, 279 yards, 3 TD
- SDG – Steve Tensi – 8/20, 118 yards, TD

**Top rushers**

- OAK – Clem Daniels – 11 rushes, 104 yards
- SDG – Paul Lowe – 10 rushes, 125 yards

**Top receivers**

- OAK – Art Powell – 4 receptions, 86 yards, 2 TD
- SDG – Gary Garrison – 7 receptions, 96 yards, TD

On the game's second play Tom Flores completed a 68-yard pass, following up with his first touchdown three plays later. The Chargers also had a big play on their first drive, as Lowe broke clear for 57 yards around left end, eventually being tackled at the 2. Garrison's touchdown catch came two plays later. San Diego added a field goal on their next possession, but Oakland then took control with three consecutive touchdown drives, the second following a missed field goal and the third set up by an interception of Hadl.

Trailing 28–10, Tensi replaced Hadl in the second half and opened up with a field goal drive, but Van Raaphorst had another attempt blocked late in the 3rd quarter. Clem Daniels had a 64-yard run two plays later, leading to a Raiders touchdown. San Diego didn't score again until Tensi and MacKinnon combined in the final seconds.

Oakland gained 477 yards in total, the most San Diego's defense had given up since 1962.

==== Week 13: at Denver Broncos ====
Week Thirteen: San Diego Chargers at Denver Broncos – Game summary

| Quarter | 1 | 2 | 3 | 4 | Total |
|---|---|---|---|---|---|
| Chargers | 0 | 0 | 3 | 14 | **17** |
| **Broncos** | 3 | 0 | 3 | 14 | **20** |

at Bears Stadium, Denver, Colorado

- Date: November 27
- Game weather: 29 °F (−1.7 °C), relative humidity 62%, wind 6 mph, wind chill 22
- Game attendance: 24,860
- Box score

Game information

**First quarter**

- DEN – Gary Kroner 10-yard field goal, 5:29. Broncos 3–0. **Drive: 4 plays, 2 yards.**

**Second quarter**

- No scoring plays.

**Third quarter**

- SDG – Dick Van Raaphorst 10-yard field goal, 12:12. Tied 3–3. **Drive: 6 plays, 20 yards.**
- DEN – Gary Kroner 17-yard field goal, 5:17. Broncos 6–3. **Drive: 14 plays, 89 yards.**

**Fourth quarter**

- SDG – Lance Alworth 26-yard pass from John Hadl (Dick Van Raaphorst kick), 14:54. Chargers 10–6. **Drive: 7 plays, 57 yards.**
- DEN – John Bramlett 72-yard blocked field goal return (Gary Kroner kick), 7:24. Broncos 13–10.
- DEN – Wendell Hayes 56-yard run (Gary Kroner kick), 2:24. Broncos 20–10. **Drive: 1 play, 56 yards.**
- SDG – Lance Alworth 7-yard pass from John Hadl (Dick Van Raaphorst kick), 1:01. Broncos 20–17. **Drive: 6 plays, 54 yards.**

**Top passers**

- SDG – John Hadl – 13/30, 181 yards, 2 TD, INT
- DEN – Max Choboian – 12/25, 173 yards, INT

**Top rushers**

- SDG – Paul Lowe – 12 rushes, 66 yards
- DEN – Wendell Hayes – 12 rushes, 87 yards, TD

**Top receivers**

- SDG – Lance Alworth – 6 receptions, 111 yards, 2 TD
- DEN – Al Denson – 3 receptions, 73 yards

Duncan muffed a punt early in the game, with the Broncos recovering at the San Diego 4. From there the Charger defense was able to hold Denver to 2 yards and a short field goal. Later, a second Denver field goal attempt was blocked by Duncan. Hadl was intercepted soon afterwards, and the Broncos reached San Diego's 35-yard line before being stopped by Beauchamp's interception. Denver went for it on 4th and inches at the San Diego 19 on their next drive, but running back Mike Kellogg fumbled and they lost 10 yards. Alworth's 47-yard catch gave the Chargers their best scoring chance of the first half, but Van Raaphorst was wide right from 21 yards. The half ended with Beauchamp intercepting a long pass at his own 2, and Denver 3–0 ahead.

Don Estes recovered a fumble on the opening kickoff of the second half, setting the Chargers up at the Denver 24 and leading to a field goal; the Broncos restored their three-point lead with a Gary Kroner field goal on the next drive. Kroner had a 44-yard attempt later in the 3rd quarter, which was blocked by Gross and returned 16 yards to his own 43 by Whitehead. Lowe threw a 25-yard pass to MacKinnon on the next play, and the Chargers ended the quarter facing a 3rd and 15 on the Denver 27. Hadl hit a leaping Alworth at the Denver 2, and he progressed into the end zone for the Chargers' lone lead of the day. The Broncos reached a 4th and 3 at the San Diego 36 from where Gross batted away a 4th-down pass and the Chargers took over on downs. They drove to the Denver 14, but Van Raaphorst's 22-yard kick was blocked and run back for a touchdown by John Bramlett. San Diego reached Denver's 44 on the next possession, but Hadl's 4th-down pass was broken up, and Wendell Hayes broke away for a touchdown on the next play. Alworth caught 4 passes for 33 yards and a touchdown in the Chargers' quick response, but Denver recovered an onside kick to secure the win.

This defeat enabled the Chiefs to clinch the AFL West, ending the Chargers' three-year run as division champions. Tensi was the starting quarterback for the Chargers, but was pulled for Hadl after completing 1 pass for 7 yards from 2 official attempts (he had two further incompletions wiped out by penalties). Lowe had 25 passing yards, 66 rushing yards and 25 receiving yards.

==== Week 14: at Houston Oilers ====
Week Fourteen: San Diego Chargers at Houston Oilers – Game summary

| Quarter | 1 | 2 | 3 | 4 | Total |
|---|---|---|---|---|---|
| **Chargers** | 7 | 7 | 0 | 14 | **28** |
| Oilers | 0 | 10 | 9 | 3 | **22** |

at Rice Stadium, Houston, Texas

- Date: December 4
- Game weather: 58 °F (14.4 °C), relative humidity 83%, wind 11 mph
- Game attendance: 17,569
- Box score

Game information

**First quarter**

- SDG – Lance Alworth 78-yard pass from John Hadl (Dick Van Raaphorst kick), 1:42. Chargers 7–0. **Drive: 3 plays, 75 yards.**

**Second quarter**

- HOU – John Henry Johnson 1-yard run (George Blanda kick), 1:58. Tied 7–7. **Drive: 7 plays, 92 yards.**
- SDG – Lance Alworth 51-yard pass from John Hadl (Dick Van Raaphorst kick), 1:38. Chargers 14–7. **Drive: 3 plays, 80 yards.**
- HOU – George Blanda 51-yard field goal, 0:21. Chargers 14–10. **Drive: 4 plays, -5 yards.**

**Third quarter**

- HOU – Safety, punt struck goalposts and went out of bounds in end zone, 13:39. Chargers 14–12.
- HOU – Don Trull 1-yard run (George Blanda kick), 11:29. Oilers 19–14. **Drive: 4 plays, 47 yards.**

**Fourth quarter**

- SDG – Gary Garrison 24-yard pass from John Hadl (Dick Van Raaphorst kick), 10:22. Chargers 21–19. **Drive: 4 plays, 60 yards.**
- HOU – George Blanda 9-yard field goal, 5:58. Oilers 22–21. **Drive: 9 plays, 55 yards.**
- SDG – Jacque MacKinnon 12-yard pass from John Hadl (Dick Van Raaphorst kick), 0:31. Chargers 28–22. **Drive: 7 plays, 64 yards.**

**Top passers**

- SDG – John Hadl – 20/35, 341 yards, 4 TD, 3 INT
- HOU – Don Trull – 16/28, 205 yards, INT

**Top rushers**

- SDG – Paul Lowe – 8 rushes, 41 yards
- HOU – Hoyle Granger – 19 rushes, 183 yards

**Top receivers**

- SDG – Lance Alworth – 4 receptions, 147 yards, 2 TD
- HOU – Charley Frazier – 4 receptions, 62 yards

With the game scoreless, a Hadl pass was intercepted at his own 38, but Gross won back possession with a fumble recovery four plays later. After a holding penalty, the Chargers faced a 3rd and 13 at their own 22; Alworth made a fingertip catch at the Houston 40 and continued into the end zone for the game's first touchdown. Houston missed field goals on their next two drives, then tied the game after Hoyle Granger's 54-yard run set them off on a 92-yard touchdown drive. Starting their response with less than two minutes left in the half, San Diego needed only three Hadl passes to cover 80 yards, the last 51 to Alworth, who again got behind the last defender. Duncan made an interception on the next play from scrimmage, but Hadl was intercepted on the play after that, allowing Houston to score through a George Blanda field goal and trail only 14–10 at halftime.

Hadl was sacked at his own 2-yard line early in the 3rd quarter, causing Redman to punt from his own end zone; the punt struck the uprights and went out of bounds in the end zone for a safety. Houston added a touchdown four plays after the ensuing free kick, taking their first lead of the game. The rest of the quarter was scoreless, though Duncan blocked a Blanda field goal, and Van Raaphorst was wide right from 33 yards. San Diego covered 60 yards on four plays on their first possession of the final period; Hadl completed passes of 23, 12 and 24 yards, the last of these a touchdown to Garrison. The Oilers reached 1st and goal from the 2 in response, but eventually settled for a field goal after Ridge's 3rd-down tackle at his own 1. Following an exchange of punts, the Chargers took over at their own 36 with two minutes to play, trailing by one point. Foster gained 15 yards on a draw play, before Hadl had back-to-back completions of 18 and 17 yards to Garrison and Foster. On 3rd and 8 from the 12, Hadl found MacKinnon in the end zone for the game-winner with 31 seconds left. Houston were able to reach the San Diego 42 before the game ended with a sack of Don Trull.

Hadl had 158 of his 341 passing yards in the final quarter. The Chargers were able to win despite committing more turnovers (3 to 2) and being outgained (395 yards to 378).

==== Week 15: vs. New York Jets ====
Week Fifteen: New York Jets at San Diego Chargers – Game summary

| Quarter | 1 | 2 | 3 | 4 | Total |
|---|---|---|---|---|---|
| Jets | 9 | 3 | 7 | 8 | **27** |
| **Chargers** | 0 | 14 | 14 | 14 | **42** |

at Balboa Stadium, San Diego, California

- Date: December 11
- Game time: 1:36 p.m. PST
- Game weather: 58 °F (14.4 °C), relative humidity 59%, wind 6 mph
- Game attendance: 25,712
- Referee: John McDonough
- Box score

Game information

**First quarter**

- NYJ – Jim Turner 36-yard field goal, 9:07. Jets 3–0. **Drive: 10 plays, 47 yards.**
- NYJ – Matt Snell 1-yard run (kick blocked), 1:51. Jets 9–0. **Drive: 4 plays, 17 yards.**

**Second quarter**

- SDG – Gary Garrison 8-yard pass from John Hadl (Dick Van Raaphorst kick), 10:35. Jets 9–7. **Drive: 14 plays, 82 yards.**
- SDG – Jim Allison 9-yard run (Dick Van Raaphorst kick), 6:17. Chargers 14–9. **Drive: 7 plays, 34 yards.**
- NYJ – Jim Turner 30-yard field goal, 0:33. Chargers 14–12. **Drive: 14 plays, 53 yards.**

**Third quarter**

- SDG – Paul Lowe 1-yard run (Dick Van Raaphorst kick), 14:13. Chargers 21–12. **Drive: 2 plays, 58 yards.**
- NYJ – Pete Lammons 53-yard pass from Joe Namath (Jim Turner kick), 7:25. Chargers 21–19. **Drive: 6 plays, 80 yards.**
- SDG – John Hadl 11-yard run (Dick Van Raaphorst kick), 3:51. Chargers 28–19. **Drive: 5 plays, 41 yards.**

**Fourth quarter**

- SDG – Jacque MacKinnon 3-yard pass from John Hadl (Dick Van Raaphorst kick), 9:14. Chargers 35–19. **Drive: 11 plays, 80 yards.**
- SDG – Paul Lowe 9-yard run (Dick Van Raaphorst kick), 7:25. Chargers 42–19. **Drive: 2 plays, 55 yards.**
- NYJ – Bill Mathis 3-yard run (Mike Taliaferro run), 2:44. Chargers 42–27. **Drive: 12 plays, 64 yards.**

**Top passers**

- NYJ – Joe Namath – 10/21, 166 yards, TD, 2 INT
- SDG – John Hadl – 14/27, 240 yards, 2 TD, INT

**Top rushers**

- NYJ – Matt Snell – 18 rushes, 102 yards, TD
- SDG – Paul Lowe – 14 rushes, 126 yards, 2 TD

**Top receivers**

- NYJ – Pete Lammons – 3 receptions, 123 yards, TD
- SDG – Lance Alworth – 7 receptions, 127 yards

New York was already 3–0 ahead when Hadl was intercepted in his own territory, leading to a 17-yard touchdown drive; Duncan blocked the extra point. Hadl responded by converting two 3rd downs with completions, one to Alworth on 3rd and 5 and one to Garrison on 3rd and goal from the 8. Archie Matsos intercepted Namath two plays later, setting up his offense at the New York 34. Hadl was sacked for the loss of 11, Lowe gained 8 yards back, then the Chargers ran a flea flicker on 3rd and 13, with Hadl finding Garrison for 20 yards. The drive ended with Allison's touchdown, to which the Jets responded with a 14-play field goal drive, leaving San Diego 14–12 ahead at the break.

Lowe opened the second half by breaking through the middle for a 57-yard gain to the Jets 1-yard line, before scoring on the following play. Namath pulled his team back within two points with a 53-yard touchdown pass, then the Jets muffed a punt that Degen recovered at their 41. Hadl ran for gains of 20 and 11 yards, the latter carry for a touchdown. Namath's 60-yard pass had the Jets threatening again, but Redman made an end zone interception on 3rd and 7 from the 8. Hadl converted a 3rd and 24 with a 36-yard pass to MacKinnon, then threw a 3-yard touchdown to the same player. On the next three plays, Duncan intercepted Namath and returned the ball 14 yards to his own 45, Alworth caught a 46-yard pass and Lowe scored from the 9. That gave the Chargers three touchdowns in three possessions, to which the Jets could only respond with a single late touchdown.

Lowe's 126 rushing yards represented both his highest total of the season and the 15th and final 100-yard game of his career.

==== Week 16: vs. Kansas City Chiefs ====
Week Sixteen: Kansas City Chiefs at San Diego Chargers – Game summary

| Quarter | 1 | 2 | 3 | 4 | Total |
|---|---|---|---|---|---|
| **Chiefs** | 14 | 3 | 3 | 7 | **27** |
| Chargers | 3 | 7 | 7 | 0 | **17** |

at Balboa Stadium, San Diego, California

- Date: December 18
- Game time: 1:35 p.m. PST
- Game weather: 57 °F (13.9 °C), relative humidity 54%, wind 7 mph
- Game attendance: 28,548
- Referee: Bob Finley
- Box score

Game information

**First quarter**

- SDG – Dick Van Raaphorst 26-yard field goal, 11:10. Chargers 3–0. **Drive: 7 plays, 48 yards.**
- KAN – Curtis McClinton 1-yard run (Mike Mercer kick), 6:47. Chiefs 7–3. **Drive: 7 plays, 82 yards.**
- KAN – Bert Coan 15-yard run (Mike Mercer kick), 0:47. Chiefs 14–3. **Drive: 6 plays, 44 yards.**

**Second quarter**

- SDG – Lance Alworth 38-yard pass from John Hadl (Dick Van Raaphorst kick), 3:45. Chiefs 14–10. **Drive: 5 plays, 62 yards.**
- KAN – Mike Mercer 35-yard field goal, 0:22. Chiefs 17–10. **Drive: 12 plays, 48 yards.**

**Third quarter**

- SDG – Paul Lowe 6-yard run (Dick Van Raaphorst kick), 10:37. Tied 17–17. **Drive: 6 plays, 38 yards.**
- KAN – Mike Mercer 25-yard field goal, 6:32. Chiefs 20–17. **Drive: 7 plays, 39 yards.**

**Fourth quarter**

- KAN – Mike Garrett 4-yard run (Mike Mercer kick), 1:47. Chiefs 27–17. **Drive: 10 plays, 80 yards.**

**Top passers**

- KAN – Len Dawson – 9/15, 121 yards, INT
- SDG – John Hadl – 17/36, 239 yards, TD, 2 INT

**Top rushers**

- KAN – Mike Garrett – 25 rushes, 161 yards, TD
- SDG – Paul Lowe – 16 rushes, 78 yards, TD

**Top receivers**

- KAN – Otis Taylor – 3 receptions, 90 yards
- SDG – Lance Alworth – 8 receptions, 156 yards, TD

Alworth drew a 37-yard pass interference penalty on the game's first play, leading to a successful Van Raaphorst field goal. A 48-yard completion from Dawson was the biggest play as the Chiefs responded with a touchdown. Hadl fumbled while being sacked on the next drive, with the Chargers recovering for a loss of 30 yards at their own 3-yard line. After a punt, Kansas City started at the San Diego 44 and drove for another touchdown. Redman ran 32 yards with a fake punt early in the 2nd quarter, but that drive ended with a missed 26-yard kick from Van Raaphorst. Alworth later scored on a 38-yard touchdown catch, before Kansas City added a field goal and led 17–10 at halftime.

DeLong recovered a fumble at the Chiefs 38 on the first play of the second half, leading to Lowe's game-tying touchdown. After another Kansas City field goal, Alworth's 38-yard catch on 3rd and 15 moved the ball to the Chiefs 44, but Hadl was intercepted two plays later. In the final quarter, Tolbert intercepted a long Dawson pass at the 2 before throwing a lateral to Whitehead, who returned the ball to the Chargers 22. Lowe's 22-yard run and Garrison's 5-yard catch converted a pair of 3rd and 1 situations as San Diego drove to a first down at the Chiefs 22-yard line. After a 9-yard sack on Lowe and an incompletion, Hadl's 25-yard pass to Garrison was wiped out by a 23-yard holding penalty. Following a further incompletion, the Chargers punted, and Kansas City drove 80 yards for the clinching touchdown.

This was the final Chargers game at Balboa Stadium, as the team would move into the newly constructed San Diego Stadium the following season.

=== Standings ===
AFL Western Division
| | W | L | T | PCT | DIV | PF | PA | STK |
|---|---|---|---|---|---|---|---|---|
| Kansas City Chiefs | 11 | 2 | 1 | .846 | 5–1 | 448 | 276 | W3 |
| Oakland Raiders | 8 | 5 | 1 | .615 | 4–2 | 315 | 288 | W1 |
| San Diego Chargers | 7 | 6 | 1 | .538 | 2–4 | 335 | 284 | L1 |
| Denver Broncos | 4 | 10 | 0 | .286 | 1–5 | 196 | 381 | L2 |

Note: Tie games were not officially counted in the standings in the AFL.

== Awards ==
Six Chargers were in the West team for the AFL All-Star game, while three were named to the Associated Press All-AFL 1st team and one to the 2nd team. Also, Alworth received two of the twenty-seven available votes for the UPI AFL player of the year award.

| Player | Position | All-Star | AP 1st-team All-Pro | AP 2nd-team All-Pro |
|---|---|---|---|---|
| Lance Alworth | Flanker | Yes | Yes | |
| Speedy Duncan | Cornerback | Yes | | Yes |
| Kenny Graham | Safety | | Yes | |
| Jacque MacKinnon | Tight end | Yes | | |
| Ron Mix | Tackle | Yes | Yes | |
| Walt Sweeney | Guard | Yes | | |
| Dick Van Raaphorst | Kicker | Yes | | |
