= John Farris (American football) =

American football player (born 1940)

No. 62
- Position: Guard

Personal information
- Born: November 2, 1940 (age 86); Kansas City, Missouri, U.S.
- Listed height: 6 ft 4 in (1.93 m)
- Listed weight: 245 lb (111 kg)

Career information
- High school: St. Anthony (Long Beach, California)
- College: Cerritos (1960–1961); San Diego State (1962–1964)
- NFL draft: 1964: 11th round, 147th overall pick
- AFL draft: 1964: 17th round, 136th overall pick

Career history
- San Diego Chargers (1965–1966); Miami Dolphins (1967)*
- * Offseason or practice squad member only

Awards and highlights
- Second-team All-Pacific Coast (1964); 2× First-team All-CCAA (1963, 1964)

Career AFL statistics
- Games played: 28
- Games started: 0
- Stats at Pro Football Reference

John Speed Farris (born November 2, 1940) is an American former professional football player who was a guard for the San Diego Chargers of the American Football League (AFL). He played college football for the Cerritos Falcons and San Diego State Aztecs. After college, Farris was selected by the Chargers in the 17th round of the 1964 AFL draft. He played two seasons for San Diego before he was traded to the Miami Dolphins and subsequently released.

== Early life ==
John Speed Farris was born on November 2, 1940, in Kansas City, Missouri, and grew up in Lakewood, California. His father, also named John, played college football for the Santa Clara Broncos under head coach Maurice J. "Clipper" Smith in the mid-1930s before embarking on a professional football career. Farris attended St. Anthony High School in Long Beach, California, though he "never showed an interest in football" during this time, choosing to play baseball instead.

== College career ==
Farris later enrolled at nearby Cerritos College, where he was a two-year letterman in football in 1960 and 1961. According to his father: "He decided to try it... and he quickly developed." Farris was the starting right tackle for the Falcons in both seasons. He was also listed as the team's heaviest player at 226 lb (103 kg).

Farris transferred to San Diego State University (SDSU), where he played three more seasons. He immediately won the starting left tackle job for the Aztecs in 1962, joining an offensive line described as "one of the biggest in [the] collegiate ranks". In 1963, Farris was named a first-team all-California Collegiate Athletic Association (CCAA) selection. He repeated as a first-team all-CCAA performer in 1964, and collected second-team All-Pacific Coast and first-team Little All-Coast honors, both from United Press International (UPI). Farris was named the Aztecs' Most Valuable Lineman in each of his last two seasons as well. He was described by his head coach at SDSU, Don Coryell, as "the finest lineman [he had] ever coached". During his time in school, Farris was a member of the Sigma Chi fraternity. He was inducted into the Aztec Hall of Fame as a member of the class of 2008.

== Professional career ==
Farris was selected by the San Diego Chargers of the American Football League (AFL) in the 17th round (136th overall) of the 1964 AFL draft with a future draft pick, which allowed the team to draft him before his college eligibility was over. He was also selected by the Los Angeles Rams of the National Football League (NFL) in the 11th round (147th overall) of the 1964 NFL draft. Despite "weighing attractive offers" from the Rams, it was announced on December 2, 1964, that Farris had signed with the Chargers. He received praise from head coach Sid Gillman, who said a few weeks later that San Diego "got a splendid guard in John Farris". Farris was one of a record 38 rookies who reported to training camp in July 1965. Within a few days, he was highlighted as the "best-looking rookie" in camp by the Daily Times-Advocate, who reported that "the entire staff was enthused about [his] play". Farris was the only rookie tabbed as a starter in the team's first intra-squad scrimmage on July 24, opening at left guard ahead of regular Pat Shea. He missed the second team scrimmage the following week after suffering a badly sprained right wrist, but was back in time for their first preseason game against the Oakland Raiders.

As a rookie in 1965, Farris appeared in all 14 games for San Diego as a reserve left guard, though he was mostly used on special teams. He credited teammate Ernie Ladd with helping him improve his line play, even choosing to block the then-315 lb (143 kg) defensive tackle on pass drills during the preseason. In a game against the New York Jets in October, Farris recovered a fumble in the red zone on a punt return by Kern Carson midway through the fourth quarter, setting up a field goal in an eventual 34–9 win. The Chargers captured the AFL Western Division title after finishing the season with a 9–2–3 record and lost to the Buffalo Bills in the AFL Championship Game by a score of 23–0. Farris was initially ruled out of the title game due to a strained knee, but he recovered and was able to play in the only playoff game of his career.

"Bulk and mobility are necessities for a good pass blocker. If you don't have those two things, the big tackles will just pick you up and wheel you back like you're on roller skates." – Farris in 1966

In 1966, Farris again appeared in all 14 games for San Diego as a left guard, serving in a backup role behind starter Ed Mitchell. The Chargers went 7–6–1 and failed to qualify for the playoffs. On April 25, 1967, Farris was traded to the Miami Dolphins for defensive back John McGeever. He was one of 27 veterans who were ordered by Miami head coach George Wilson to report to training camp a week early along with the rookies. However, Farris never showed up to camp, and was subsequently released. According to Wilson: "We've never heard from Farris and [Bob] Petrich said he heard he was talking of joining the Peace Corps."
