= St. Anthony High School (California) =

Private school in Long Beach, United States

Location
- 620 Olive Avenue; Long Beach 90802; United States; 33°46′30″N 118°10′56″W

Information
- Type: Private, Coeducational
- Motto: Spes Nostra (Our Hope)
- Religious affiliation: Roman Catholic
- Patron saint: St. Anthony of Padua
- Established: 1920
- Oversight: Archdiocese of Los Angeles
- President: Christine Tucker
- Principal: Adan Jaramillo
- Teaching staff: 19.8 (FTE)
- Grades: 9-12
- Enrollment: 525 (2015-2016)
- Student to teacher ratio: 22.1
- Campus: Urban
- Colors: Purple and White
- Mascot: Antonio, The Saint
- Team name: Saints
- Accreditation: Western Association of Schools and Colleges
- Yearbook: Anthonian
- Website: www.longbeachsaints.org

St. Anthony High School is a private, Roman Catholic high school located in Long Beach, California. It is served by the Roman Catholic Archdiocese of Los Angeles.

== History ==
St. Anthony High School was founded as a Catholic coeducational high school in 1920 by the Sisters of the Immaculate Heart and St. Anthony Parish. In 1940, the Brothers of Holy Cross joined the Sisters on campus and St. Anthony became a boys' school and a girls' school with facilities dedicated to each on the same campus. In 1972 the two schools merged and St. Anthony became coeducational once again. Today, St. Anthony High School is an Archdiocesan high school and remains a co-ed school.

== Notable alumni ==
- Dave Adlesh (1962), professional baseball player for the Houston Astros
- Joey Amalfitano (1951), professional baseball player and coach
- Lou Berberet (1947), professional baseball player
- Ernie Cheatham (1947), professional football player
- Cormac Carney (1977), judge of the United States District Court for the Central District of California
- John Farris, professional football player
- Tiare Jennings (2020), college softball player
- William Levada (1954), cardinal of the Roman Catholic Church
- Dan Lungren (1964), former U.S. Congressman, and Attorney General of California from 1991 to 1999.
- Darrick Martin (1988), professional basketball player
- George Niederauer (1954), former Roman Catholic Archbishop of San Francisco
- Johnny Olszewski (1949), professional football player
- Jack Snow (1961), professional football player
- Manu Tuiasosopo (1975), professional football player
- Curtis Weaver (2016), professional football player for the Miami Dolphins
