= Steve Tensi =

American football player (1942–2024)

No. 13
- Position: Quarterback

Personal information
- Born: December 8, 1942; Cheviot, Ohio, U.S.
- Died: March 15, 2024 (aged 81); Boone, North Carolina, U.S.
- Listed height: 6 ft 5 in (1.96 m)
- Listed weight: 215 lb (98 kg)

Career information
- High school: Elder (Cincinnati, Ohio)
- College: Florida State (1961-1964)
- NFL draft: 1965: 16th round, 224th overall pick
- AFL draft: 1965: 4th round, 30th overall pick

Career history

Playing
- San Diego Chargers (1965–1966); Denver Broncos (1967–1970)

Coaching
- Chicago Fire (1974) Receivers coach

Career NFL/AFL statistics
- Passing attempts: 862
- Passing completions: 369
- Completion percentage: 42.8%
- TD–INT: 43–46
- Passing yards: 5,558
- Passer rating: 59
- Stats at Pro Football Reference

Stephen Michael Tensi (December 8, 1942 – March 15, 2024) was an American professional football player who was a quarterback in the American Football League (AFL) and the National Football League (NFL). He played college football for the Florida State Seminoles. He played professionally for the San Diego Chargers (1965–1966) and the Denver Broncos (1967–1970).

== College career ==
After graduating from Elder High School in Cincinnati, Ohio, where he had been his high school MVP and first-team All City and Cincinnati Post All-Metro, Tensi went to Florida State University. His biggest collegiate success came in 1964, his senior year at FSU. The Seminoles switched to a pro set offense that year and had one of the highest scoring teams in college football, averaging nearly 24 points a game. Tensi threw for 1,683 yards and 14 TDs in FSU's 10 games, many of which were thrown to first-team All American and future Oakland Raiders great Fred Biletnikoff. Behind the Tensi to Biletnikoff tandem, and a defense which had four shutouts, Florida State enjoyed its best record up until that time, going 9–1–1. Their victories included a blowout win over #5 ranked University of Kentucky and the Seminoles' first win ever against the University of Florida. Tensi capped the season with five touchdown passes and 303 yards in passing (and four interceptions) in Florida State's 36–19 Gator Bowl victory over the University of Oklahoma. He and Biletnikoff were named co-FSU players of the game.

In 1981, Tensi was named to Florida State's athletic Hall of Fame.

== Professional career ==
Tensi was drafted by the NFL's Baltimore Colts and the AFL's San Diego Chargers. Rather than go to the Colts—led then by Johnny Unitas—Tensi signed with the Chargers immediately after the Gator Bowl. Seminoles coach Bill Peterson learned his pro set offense from Chargers' coach Sid Gillman, and the Seminoles used some of the same terminology in their offense as the Chargers as well. However, Tensi played little in San Diego, backing up quarterback John Hadl. Tensi did not throw a single pass in 1965, but threw five touchdown passes against only one interception in limited duty in 1966, including four touchdown passes in the second half to defeat the Miami Dolphins on October 2, 1966, in his first game in the AFL.

The Denver Broncos were in the market for a new quarterback for 1967. In 1966, they started four different quarterbacks and played a total of five. These five signal callers combined for a ratio of 12 touchdown passes to 30 interceptions, and finished last in the American Football League in scoring. On August 15, 1967, shortly before the 1967 season, new coach and general manager Lou Saban traded Denver's #1 draft picks in the 1968 and 1969 common AFL-NFL draft for Tensi. These proved to be valuable picks for San Diego, becoming the #4 and #9 overall selections respectively. Tensi started 12 of 14 games for the Broncos in 1967, who finished 3–11 and allowed the most points in the AFL. However, their offensive numbers were an improvement over 1966. According to former Broncos executive Jim Saccomano, Tensi's effectiveness and health in Denver was hamstrung by weak pass protection. In 1968, Tensi's football career took a major hit as his collarbone was broken twice—first in a preseason game against the San Francisco 49ers and later in a regular season game. Tensi's injuries helped open the door for rookie Marlin Briscoe to play quarterback for the Broncos and become the first African-American quarterback in modern American pro football history. However, Tensi was back as the starting quarterback for 1969 after Briscoe was traded to Buffalo. He started every game, recorded 1,990 passing yards and 14 touchdowns, but won only 4 of his 12 starts that year. After the AFL–NFL merger, Pete Liske took over as the starting quarterback in 1970, but it was Tensi who came off the bench in the season-opener to throw the Broncos' first touchdown pass in the NFL in a come-from-behind victory over the Bills. Tensi's final game was against the Oakland Raiders on November 15, 1970. After the season, Tensi recalled, "The injury affected my shoulder, and I just couldn't throw with strength anymore. I told Lou (Saban) to find someone else. I was retiring."

Comments by football scouts on Tensi late in his career noted his excellent size (at 6'5", he was one of the tallest pro quarterbacks of his day) but gave him mixed reviews in other areas. One scout said, "Tensi has excellent size for a quarterback. He's tall enough to throw over defensive linemen from the pocket. He can set up shorter than most quarterbacks due to his height. He has a very strong arm and can throw long and he also has good accuracy on short routes. He can beat you with the bomb if his protection holds up, but he is not a good scrambler." Another scout said, "Tensi is just fair. He's a big tall guy who can throw the ball but he doesn't have the peripheral vision which allows you to look and pick things out. Other quarterbacks have better clarity of vision as far as seeing people in the secondary."

After his playing career, Tensi remained in football as a coach for a few years. He served as a quarterbacks coach for the Wichita State University Shockers for two seasons. He then worked as receivers coach for the 1974 Chicago Fire of the World Football League.

== Professional career statistics ==
Legend
	Led the league
**Bold**	Career high

Year	Team	Games			Passing										Rushing					Sacks	
Year	Team	GP	GS	Record	Cmp	Att	Pct	Yds	Y/A	Y/G	Lng	TD	Int	Rtg	Att	Yds	Avg	Lng	TD	Sck	SckY
1965	SD	1	0	0–0–0	0	0	0.0	0	0.0	0.0	0	0	0	—	0	0	0.0	0	0	0	0
1966	SD	**14**	2	0–2–0	21	52	40.4	405	**7.8**	28.9	63	5	1	**92.2**	1	-1	-1.0	-1	0	3	37
1967	DEN	**14**	**12**	3–9–0	**131**	**325**	40.3	1,915	5.9	136.8	76	**16**	**17**	54.8	**24**	4	0.2	13	0	**39**	**350**
1968	DEN	7	6	**3–3–0**	48	119	40.3	709	6.0	101.3	72	5	8	46.5	6	2	0.3	2	0	5	42
1969	DEN	13	**12**	4–7–1	**131**	286	45.8	**1,990**	7.0	**153.1**	**79**	14	12	68.1	12	**63**	**5.3**	**17**	0	29	208
1970	DEN	7	2	0–2–0	38	80	**47.5**	539	6.7	77.0	42	3	8	42.7	4	14	3.5	15	0	6	35
Career		56	34	10–23–1	369	862	42.8	5,558	6.4	99.3	79	43	46	59.0	47	82	1.7	17	0	82	672

== Personal life ==
Tensi was born on December 8, 1942, in Cheviot, Ohio. He married his college sweetheart Barbara Jean, whom he had met at freshman orientation at Florida State. He later joined his father-in-law in the construction business in Miami and subsequently moved to a small town in North Carolina. He died in Boone, North Carolina, on March 15, 2024, at the age of 81.

== See also ==
- List of American Football League players
