= Don Estes =

American football player (1938–2004)

No. 60, 50, 68
- Position: Guard

Personal information
- Born: October 14, 1938; Tomball, Texas, U.S.
- Died: September 6, 2004 (aged 65); Brookhaven, Mississippi, U.S.
- Listed height: 6 ft 3 in (1.91 m)
- Listed weight: 250 lb (113 kg)

Career information
- High school: Brookhaven (MS)
- College: LSU
- NFL draft: 1963: 4th round, 45th overall pick
- AFL draft: 1963: 2nd round, 15th overall pick

Career history
- Ottawa Rough Riders (1963–1964); Montreal Alouettes (1965); San Diego Chargers (1966)

Career AFL statistics
- Games played: 5
- Stats at Pro Football Reference

Donald O'Larey Estes (October 14, 1938 – September 6, 2004) was an American professional football player. He played guard in the American Football League (AFL) in five games for the San Diego Chargers in 1966. He was drafted by the Chargers in the fourth round of the 1963 AFL draft, and also by the St. Louis Cardinals of the National Football League (NFL) in the second round of the 1963 NFL draft. He attended Louisiana State University, where he played college football for the LSU Tigers football team. Estes was born in Tomball, Texas and attended Brookhaven High School in Brookhaven, Mississippi.
