= George Gross (American football) =

American football player (1941–2010)

No. 79
- Position: Defensive tackle

Personal information
- Born: January 26, 1941; Uila, Romania
- Died: April 27, 2010 (aged 69); Fairhope, Alabama, U.S.
- Listed height: 6 ft 3 in (1.91 m)
- Listed weight: 270 lb (122 kg)

Career information
- High school: Thomas Jefferson (Elizabeth, New Jersey, U.S.)
- College: Auburn
- NFL draft: 1962: 8th round, 103rd overall pick
- AFL draft: 1962: 16th round, 128th overall pick

Career history
- San Diego Chargers (1963-1967)

Awards and highlights
- AFL champion (1963)

Career AFL statistics
- Sacks: 15.5
- Stats at Pro Football Reference

George Gross (January 26, 1941 – April 27, 2010) was an American football defensive tackle. He played professionally in the American Football League (AFL) for five seasons, from 1963 to 1967, with the San Diego Chargers. He joined the Chargers' outstanding defensive line, known as the "Fearsome Foursome", playing with defensive ends Bob Petrich and Earl Faison and defensive tackle Ernie Ladd. Gross was born in Vajola, Romania (Weilau in his native German; now Uila, Romania) and died in Fairhope, Alabama.

Raised in Elizabeth, New Jersey, Gross played prep football at Thomas Jefferson High School.

== See also ==
- List of American Football League players
