= Gary Kroner =

American football player (born 1940)

No. 12, 7
- Position: Placekicker

Personal information
- Born: November 6, 1940 (age 86); Green Bay, Wisconsin, U.S.
- Listed height: 6 ft 2 in (1.88 m)
- Listed weight: 195 lb (88 kg)

Career information
- College: Wisconsin (1959–1962)
- NFL draft: 1963: 7th round, 93rd overall pick
- AFL draft: 1963: 19th round, 147th overall pick

Career history
- Green Bay Packers (1963–1964)*; Denver Broncos (1965–1967)
- * Offseason or practice squad member only

Career AFL statistics
- Field goals: 29
- Field goal attempts: 56
- Field goal %: 51.8
- Longest field goal: 46
- Stats at Pro Football Reference

Gary Lee Kroner (born November 6, 1940) is an American former professional football player who was a placekicker for the Denver Broncos of the American Football League (AFL). He played college football for the Wisconsin Badgers.

Kroner was born in 1940 in Green Bay, Wisconsin, and attended Premontre High School in Green Bay. He then enrolled at the University of Wisconsin where he played as both a halfback and placekicker for the Badgers from 1960 to 1962. As a member of the Big Ten and Rose Bowl champion 1962 Wisconsin Badgers football team, Kroner converted 27 of 27 extra point kicks and set Wisconsin school records for points scored by kicking (36) and conversion percentage (100%).

Kroner was selected 93rd overall by the Green Bay Packers in the seventh round of the 1963 NFL draft. He participated in the Packers' 1962 preseason as a defensive back and kicker. He later played in the AFL as placekicker for the Denver Broncos from 1965 to 1967. He appeared in 31 AFL games for the Broncos, tallying 144 points on 29 field goals and 57 extra points.
