= Max Choboian =

American football player (1942–1977)

No. 15
- Position: Quarterback

Personal information
- Born: March 17, 1942; Tulare, California, U.S.
- Died: January 2, 1977 (aged 34); Fresno, California, U.S.
- Listed height: 6 ft 4 in (1.93 m)
- Listed weight: 215 lb (98 kg)

Career information
- High school: Tulare Union (Tulare, California)
- College: Cal State Northridge

Career history
- Denver Broncos (1966)

Career statistics
- Passing attempts: 163
- Passing completions: 82
- Completion percentage: 50.3%
- TD–INT: 4–12
- Passing yards: 1,110
- Passer rating: 49.9
- Stats at Pro Football Reference

Max John Choboian (March 17, 1942 – January 2, 1977) was an American collegiate and professional football quarterback who played professionally in the American Football League (AFL). Born in Tulare, California, he played only one season in the AFL for the Denver Broncos and started seven games. He died of lung cancer.

== See also ==
- List of American Football League players
