= Houston Ridge =

American football player (1944–2015)

Profile
- Positions: Defensive end, defensive tackle

Personal information
- Born: July 18, 1944; Madera, California, U.S.
- Died: October 17, 2015 (aged 71); San Diego, California, U.S.
- Listed height: 6 ft 4 in (1.93 m)
- Listed weight: 270 lb (122 kg)

Career information
- College: San Diego State
- AFL draft: 1966: 13th round, 117th overall pick

Career history
- San Diego Chargers (1966–1969)

Career statistics
- Games played: 44
- Games started: 31
- Fumble recoveries: 1
- Stats at Pro Football Reference

Houston Robert Ridge Jr. (July 18, 1944 – October 17, 2015) was an American professional football defensive lineman who played four seasons for the San Diego Chargers of the American Football League (AFL). He achieved notoriety for filing a class-action lawsuit against the team in 1969 after suffering career-ending injuries that he claimed were caused by steroids and amphetamines issued to players. Ridge ultimately reached a $250,000 settlement with the Chargers.
