= Jacque MacKinnon =

American football player (1938–1975)

No. 85, 38, 37, 67, 88
- Positions: Fullback, tight end

Personal information
- Born: November 10, 1938; Dover, New Jersey, U.S.
- Died: March 6, 1975 (aged 36); San Diego, California, U.S.
- Listed height: 6 ft 4 in (1.93 m)
- Listed weight: 235 lb (107 kg)

Career information
- High school: Dover (NJ)
- College: Colgate
- NFL draft: 1961: 20th round, 280th overall pick
- AFL draft: 1962: 33rd round, 264th overall pick

Career history
- San Diego Chargers (1961-1969); Oakland Raiders (1970); Southern California Sun (1974)

Awards and highlights
- AFL champion (1963); Second-team All-AFL (1968); 2× AFL All-Star (1966, 1968); Los Angeles Chargers Hall of Fame

Career NFL/AFL statistics
- Receptions: 112
- Receiving yards: 2,109
- Rushing yards: 381
- Rushing average: 4.4
- Total touchdowns: 22
- Stats at Pro Football Reference

Jacque Harold MacKinnon (November 10, 1938 – March 6, 1975) was an American professional football tight end, playing most of his career in the American Football League (AFL) with the San Diego Chargers. He also was a member of the Oakland Raiders in the National Football League (NFL) and the Southern California Sun in the World Football League (WFL). He played college football at Colgate University.

== Early life ==
Born and raised in Dover, New Jersey, MacKinnon attended Dover High School. He was a running back in football, a sprinter in track and a center in basketball.

He accepted a football scholarship from Colgate University, where he was a standout at halfback.

== Professional career ==
MacKinnon was selected by the San Diego Chargers in the 33rd round (264th overall) of the 1962 AFL draft and the Philadelphia Eagles in the 20th round (280th overall) of the 1961 NFL draft. As the last player selected in the 1961 NFL draft, he was designated Mr. Irrelevant, however, he was the only such player ever to be selected as an All-Star, before Brock Purdy in 2024.

He opted to sign with the San Diego Chargers of the American Football League to play as a fullback. In 1966, he was moved to tight end to take advantage of his blocking and receiver skills. Head coach, Sid Gillman, employed MacKinnon with Dave Kocourek in the first "twin tight-end" formations seen in professional football. He was on the Chargers' 1963 AFL Championship team in their victory over the Boston Patriots. He was an AFL All-Star in 1966 and 1968. In 1968, he averaged 19.6 yards per reception, posting 33 receptions for 646 yards and 6 touchdowns.

On April 29, 1970, he was traded to the Green Bay Packers in exchange for a future draft pick, but he refused to report and instead opted to retire.

On September 15, 1970, he signed as a free agent with the Oakland Raiders, at the time part of the National Football League. In 1974, he signed with the Southern California Sun in the World Football League to play tight end.

In 1976, he was a part of the initial four former players (along with Emil Karas, Frank Buncom, Bob Laraba), that were inducted posthumously into the San Diego Chargers Hall of Fame.

== Personal life ==
MacKinnon was out of football when he died in 1975. After fleeing the scene of a car accident and apparently drunk, MacKinnon jumped over a tall fence, not knowing about the construction site on the other side. MacKinnon fell some 30 feet and died of injuries caused by the fall.

== See also ==
- List of American Football League players
- List of NCAA major college yearly punt and kickoff return leaders
