= Bud Whitehead =

American football player (born 1939)

No. 47
- Position: Defensive back

Personal information
- Born: January 1, 1939 (age 87); Marianna, Florida, U.S.

Career information
- College: Florida State
- AFL draft: 1961: 16th round, 128th overall pick

Career history
- San Diego Chargers (1961–1968)

Awards and highlights
- AFL champion (1963)

Career statistics
- Games played: 94
- Interceptions: 15
- Touchdowns: 1
- Stats at Pro Football Reference

Ruben Agnus "Bud" Whitehead (born January 1, 1939) is an American former professional football player who was a defensive back for the San Diego Chargers of the American Football League (AFL). A 16th-round selection (128th overall pick) of the 1961 AFL draft, Whitehead played eight seasons with the Chargers (1961–1968). He had 10 interceptions in his senior year of college football for the Florida State Seminoles.

== Early life ==
Born and raised in Marianna, Florida, he played football for Marianna High School before attending Florida State University. He was the second child of Clara Peacock and Alter Whitehead, with one older brother, Jim Whitehead, and four younger siblings, brothers Gary, Willie and Ronnie Whitehead and sister Denise Whitehead.

== See also ==
- List of American Football League players
