= Terry Owens (American football) =

American football player (1944–2012)

No. 76
- Position: Offensive tackle

Personal information
- Born: July 5, 1944; Jasper, Alabama, U.S.
- Died: October 27, 2012 (aged 68); Decatur, Alabama, U.S.
- Listed height: 6 ft 6 in (1.98 m)
- Listed weight: 260 lb (118 kg)

Career information
- High school: Samson (AL)
- College: Jacksonville State
- NFL draft: 1966: 11th round, 167th overall pick
- AFL draft: 1966: 11th round, 99th overall pick

Career history
- San Diego Chargers (1966–1975)

Career NFL/AFL statistics
- Games played: 132
- Games started: 107
- Fumble recoveries: 3
- Stats at Pro Football Reference

Terry Woodrow Owens (July 5, 1944 – October 27, 2012) was an American professional football offensive lineman in the American Football League (AFL) and the National Football League (NFL). Owens graduated from Samson High School in 1962 before attending Jacksonville State University. Selected in the 11th round (99th overall) of the 1966 AFL draft, Owens joined the San Diego Chargers. He played for the Chargers for ten seasons. He died of Chronic traumatic encephalopathy (CTE).

== See also ==
- Other American Football League players
