= Dave Plump =

American football player (born 1942)

No. 81, 28, 48
- Position: Defensive back

Personal information
- Born: December 13, 1942 (age 83); Vicksburg, Mississippi, U.S.
- Listed height: 6 ft 1 in (1.85 m)
- Listed weight: 200 lb (91 kg)

Career information
- High school: Vallejo (Vallejo, California)
- College: Fresno State
- NFL draft: 1965: 12th round, 156th overall pick
- AFL draft: 1965: Red Shirt 10th round, 78th overall pick

Career history
- San Diego Chargers (1966); BC Lions (1967); Portland Loggers (1969)

Career AFL statistics
- Return yards: 349
- Stats at Pro Football Reference

Dave Plump (born December 13, 1942) is an American former professional football player who was a defensive back in the American Football League (AFL) and Canadian Football League (CFL). He played for the San Diego Chargers in 1966 and for the BC Lions in 1967. He played college football for the Fresno State Bulldogs.
