= Nat Whitmyer =

American football player (born 1940)

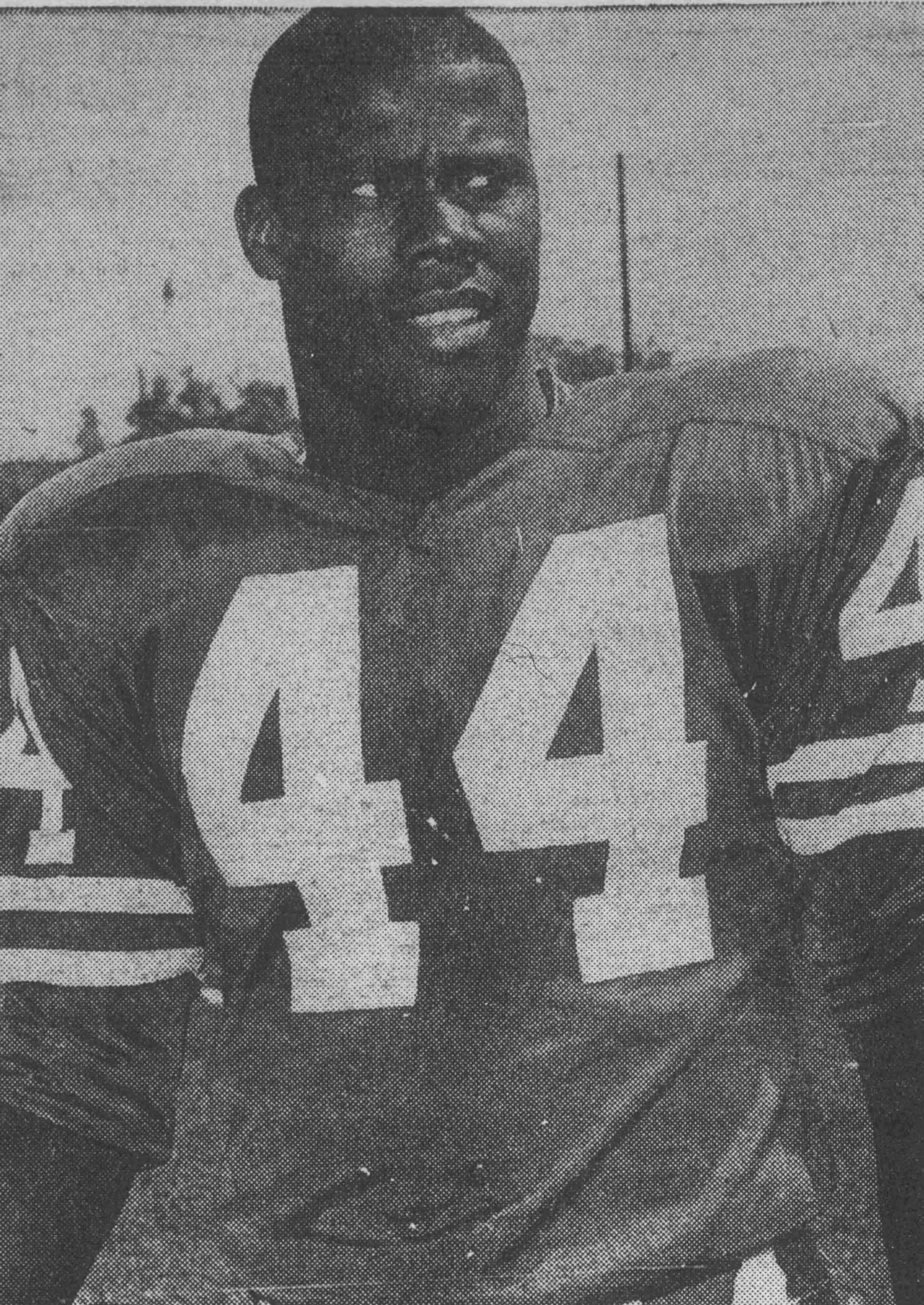
- Whitmyer with the Los Angeles Rams

Profile
- Position: Defensive back

Personal information
- Born: August 31, 1940; Washington, D.C., U.S.
- Listed height: 5 ft 11 in (1.80 m)
- Listed weight: 180 lb (82 kg)

Career information
- High school: Dunbar (DC)
- College: Alan Hancock JC, Washington

Career history
- Los Angeles Rams (1963); Providence Steamrollers (ACFL, 1964); Rhode Island Indians (CoFL, 1965); San Diego Chargers (1966)
- Stats at Pro Football Reference

Nathaniel Whitmyer (born August 31, 1940) is an American former football defensive back who played college football for Alan Hancock Junior College and Washington and professional football for the Los Angeles Rams (1963) and San Diego Chargers (1966).

== Early life ==
A native of Washington, DC, Whitmyer attended Dunbar High School in the District of Columbia and then played college football as a halfback for Alan Hancock Junior College (Santa Maria, California) in 1959 and 1960 and for the University of Washington in 1961 and 1962.

== Professional football ==
He played professional football, principally as a defensive back, for the Los Angeles Rams in 1963, appearing in seven games, three of them as a starter. He then played for the Providence Steamrollers of the Atlantic Coast Football League (ACFL) in 1964 and the Rhode Island Indians of the Continental Football League (CoFL) in 1965. In 1966, he appeared in 14 games (two as a starter) for the San Diego Chargers of the American Football League. He was kept on the bench during the 1967 season due to injuries and announced his retirement in July 1968.
