= Dick Degen =

American football player (born 1942)

No. 51
- Position: Linebacker

Personal information
- Born: March 4, 1942 (age 84); Jamestown, North Dakota
- Listed height: 6 ft 1 in (1.85 m)
- Listed weight: 220 lb (100 kg)

Career information
- High school: [Bellflower, Bellfower, CA]
- College: [Cal State Long Beach 49ers Football, Long Beach, Ca]

Career history
- San Diego Chargers (1965–1966)
- Stats at Pro Football Reference

Dick Degen (born March 4, 1942) is an American former football linebacker. He played for the San Diego Chargers from 1965 to 1966.
