= Dick Van Raaphorst =

American football player (1942–2020)

No. 30, 39
- Position: Placekicker

Personal information
- Born: December 10, 1942; Port Huron, Michigan, U.S
- Died: October 3, 2020 (aged 77); San Diego, California, U.S.
- Listed height: 6 ft 0 in (1.83 m)
- Listed weight: 218 lb (99 kg)

Career information
- High school: Charlevoix (Charlevoix, Michigan)
- College: Ohio State (1960-1963)
- NFL draft: 1964: 10th round, 138th overall pick

Career history
- Cleveland Browns (1964)*; Dallas Cowboys (1964); Chicago Bears (1965)*; San Diego Chargers (1966-1967)
- * Offseason or practice squad member only

Awards and highlights
- AFL All-Star (1966); National champion (1961)

Career NFL/AFL statistics
- Field goals made: 45
- Field goal attempts: 90
- Field goal %: 50
- Longest field goal: 43
- Stats at Pro Football Reference

Richard William Van Raaphorst (December 10, 1942 – October 3, 2020) was an American professional football placekicker in the American Football League (AFL) for the San Diego Chargers. He also was a member of the Dallas Cowboys in the National Football League (NFL). He played college football at Ohio State University.

== Early life ==
Van Raaphorst attended Charlevoix High School, before moving on to Ohio State University.

He was named the starter of the 1961 team coached by Woody Hayes that won the Big Ten Conference, but the Ohio State faculty council wanting to show that football was not overemphasized, voted against sending the Buckeyes to the Rose Bowl. The University of Minnesota was the replacement team that beat UCLA 21-3. He was injured as a junior.

As a senior, he broke the school and conference distance record with a 48-yard field goal. The next game he broke it again with a 49-yard field goal. He also set a record with 6 field goals in Big Ten Conference games and 8 in the season. The next game he broke it again with a 49-yard field goal.

== Professional career ==
=== Cleveland Browns ===
Van Raaphorst was selected by the Cleveland Browns in the tenth round (138th overall) of the 1964 NFL draft. On August 24, he was traded to the Dallas Cowboys in exchange for a draft choice, after the team decided to keep 40-year-old Lou Groza as the starter.

=== Dallas Cowboys ===
In 1964, the Dallas Cowboys were looking for a replacement for Sam Baker, and when rookie Billy Lothridge couldn't fill the kicker role, the team acquired Van Raaphorst and named him the starter. He struggled throughout the year and was replaced the next season with Danny Villanueva.

=== Chicago Bears ===
On January 13, 1965, he was claimed off waivers by the Chicago Bears, but was waived before the start of the season.

=== San Diego Chargers ===
In 1965, he was signed by the San Diego Chargers of the American Football League to their taxi squad. The next year, he was named the starter and kicked 16 field goals, while also setting a franchise record with 7 field goals attempts against the New York Jets on October 8. At the time, he had the second most field goals (31) made in franchise history.

=== Cincinnati Bengals ===
Van Raaphorst was selected by the Cincinnati Bengals in the 1968 AFL expansion draft from the San Diego Chargers roster, but he opted to retire instead of reporting to the team.

== Personal life ==
After football, he worked as a real estate developer. He served as a color analyst on the San Diego Chargers radio broadcasts in the 1970s. He won the 1968 Professional Football Players Golf Tournament.

His son Jeff Van Raaphorst played quarterback in the NFL for the Atlanta Falcons and received the 1987 Rose Bowl MVP award.

Van Raaphorst died on October 3, 2020, in San Diego, California at the age of 77.
