= Joe Beauchamp =

American football player (1944–2020)

No. 40
- Position: Defensive back

Personal information
- Born: April 11, 1944; Chicago, Illinois, U.S.
- Died: May 20, 2020 (aged 76)
- Listed height: 6 ft 0 in (1.83 m)
- Listed weight: 188 lb (85 kg)

Career information
- College: Iowa State
- AFL draft: 1966: Red Shirt 6th round, 53 (by the San Diego Chargers)th overall pick

Career history
- San Diego Chargers (1966–1975)
- Stats at Pro Football Reference

Joseph Scott Beauchamp (April 11, 1944 – May 20, 2020) was an American professional football player who was a defensive back for the San Diego Chargers. He played college football at Iowa State University before playing professionally for the Chargers in the American Football League (AFL) from 1966 through 1969 and in the National Football League (NFL) from 1970 through 1975.

His three interceptions against the Denver Broncos on September 24, 1972, is tied for the Chargers' single-game record.

Beauchamp died at age 76 on May 20, 2020.

== See also ==
- List of American Football League players
