= Jim Allison (American football) =

American football player (born 1943)

No. 32
- Position: Running back

Personal information
- Born: March 2, 1943 (age 83); Richmond, California, U.S.
- Listed height: 6 ft 0 in (1.83 m)
- Listed weight: 215 lb (98 kg)

Career information
- High school: Redondo Union (CA)
- College: El Camino, San Diego State
- AFL draft: 1965: 12th round, 94th overall pick

Career history
- San Diego Chargers (1965–1968)

Awards and highlights
- Second-team Little All-American (1964); Second-team All-PCC (1964)

Career statistics
- Rushing yards: 378
- Rushing touchdowns: 2
- Receptions: 22
- Receiving yards: 230
- Stats at Pro Football Reference

James Russell Allison (born March 2, 1943) is an American former professional football player who was a running back in the American Football League (AFL). He played college football at El Camino College and San Diego State University. He was selected in the 12th round of the 1965 AFL draft by the San Diego Chargers and played from 1965 through 1968.

== See also ==
- List of American Football League players
