= Paul Latzke =

American football player (born 1942)

No. 52, 54
- Position: Center

Personal information
- Born: March 22, 1942 (age 84); Los Angeles, California, U.S.
- Listed height: 6 ft 4 in (1.93 m)
- Listed weight: 240 lb (109 kg)

Career information
- High school: Gilroy (CA)
- College: Pacific
- NFL draft: 1965: undrafted

Career history
- San Francisco 49ers (1965)*; San Diego Chargers (1966–1968)
- * Offseason or practice squad member only
- Stats at Pro Football Reference

Paul Latzke (born March 22, 1942) is an American former professional football center. He played for the San Diego Chargers from 1966 to 1968.
