= Pat Shea (American football) =

American football player (1939–2013)

No. 64
- Position: Guard

Personal information
- Born: June 28, 1939; San Diego, California, U.S.
- Died: May 22, 2013 (aged 73); Encinitas, California, U.S.

Career information
- College: USC
- NFL draft: 1962: undrafted

Career history
- San Diego Chargers (1962–1965)

Awards and highlights
- AFL champion (1963)

Career NFL statistics
- Games played: 41
- Games started: 36
- Stats at Pro Football Reference

Patrick Beardsley Shea (June 28, 1939 – May 23, 2013) was an American professional football player who was a guard for four seasons for the San Diego Chargers in the American Football League (AFL).

Shea was born in La Jolla, California. He attended Mission Bay High School and graduated in 1958. Shea was a three-sport athlete at Mission Bay, excelling in football, wrestling and track & field. In 1958, he was the City League champion in the shot put, hitting a then school record of 55'09.25.
