= Bob Petrich =

American football player (born 1941)

No. 85, 72
- Position: Defensive end

Personal information
- Born: March 15, 1941 (age 85); Long Beach, California, U.S.
- Died: November 8, 2025
- Listed height: 6 ft 4 in (1.93 m)
- Listed weight: 252 lb (114 kg)

Career information
- High school: San Pedro (CA)
- College: West Texas State
- NFL draft: 1963: 6th round, 82nd overall pick
- AFL draft: 1963: 11th round, 82nd overall pick

Career history
- San Diego Chargers (1963-1966); Miami Dolphins (1967)*; Buffalo Bills (1967); Toronto Argonauts (1968)
- * Offseason or practice squad member only

Awards and highlights
- AFL champion (1963)

Career AFL statistics
- Interceptions: 1
- Sacks: 18.5
- Stats at Pro Football Reference

Robert Earl Petrich (born March 15, 1941) is an American former professional football player who was a defensive end in the American Football League (AFL).

Petrich played college football for West Texas State Buffaloes (now West Texas A&M), and then played four seasons for the San Diego Chargers (1963–1966) and the Buffalo Bills (1967). He also played one season for the Toronto Argonauts to end his career.
