= List of NFL players (Ha–Henn) =

This is a list of players who have appeared in at least one regular season or postseason game in the National Football League (NFL), American Football League (AFL), or All-America Football Conference (AAFC) and have a last name that falls between "Ha" and "Henn". For the rest of the H's, see list of NFL players (Henr–Hy). This list is accurate through the end of the 2025 NFL season.

== Haa–Hal ==
- Matt Haack
- Bob Haak
- Bob Haas
- Bruno Haas
- Andy Haase
- Ira Haaven
- Adam Haayer
- Brian Habib
- Bill Hachten
- Dale Hackbart
- Johnny Hackenbruck
- D. J. Hackett
- Dino Hackett
- Joey Hackett
- Elmer Hackney
- Gary Hadd
- Drew Haddad
- Al Hadden
- Kamal Hadden
- Michael Haddix
- Wayne Haddix
- Jack Haden
- Joe Haden
- Nick Haden
- Pat Haden
- John Hadl
- David Hadley
- Ron Hadley
- Spencer Hadley
- James Hadnot
- Rex Hadnot
- Joe Haeg
- Jake Haener
- Barney Hafen
- Mike Haffner
- Derek Hagan
- Javon Hagan
- Marques Hagans
- Roger Hagberg
- Swede Hagberg
- Fred Hageman
- Ra'Shede Hageman
- Halvor Hagen
- Mike Hagen
- Vern Hagenbuckle
- Britt Hager
- Bryce Hager
- Horse Hagerty
- Jack Hagerty
- Eric Hagg
- Mario Haggan
- Clark Haggans
- Luke Haggard
- Doc Haggerty
- Mike Haggerty
- Steve Haggerty
- Odell Haggins
- Isaac Hagins
- Scott Hagler
- Tyjuan Hagler
- Jay Hagood
- Rickey Hagood
- John Hagy
- Ray Hahn
- Mike Haight
- Mac Haik
- Kahlef Hailassie
- Byron Haines
- Hinkey Haines
- Hoot Haines
- John Haines
- Kris Haines
- Robert Hainsey
- Carl Hairston
- Chris Hairston
- Maxwell Hairston
- Nate Hairston
- Russell Hairston
- Stacey Hairston
- Troy Hairston
- Chuck Hajek
- Ali Haji-Sheikh
- Lirim Hajrullahu
- Az-Zahir Hakim
- Saalim Hakim
- Andre Hal
- Mike Halapin
- Jon Halapio
- George Halas
- Chris Hale
- Dave Hale
- David Hale
- Ryan Hale
- Art Haley
- Charles Haley
- Darryl Haley
- Dennis Haley
- Dick Haley
- Grant Haley
- Jermaine Haley
- Tamba Hali
- Ronnie Haliburton
- Ed Halicki
- Ahmard Hall
- Alex Hall
- Alvin Hall (born 1936)
- Alvin Hall (born 1958)
- Andre Hall
- Breece Hall
- Bryan Hall
- Bryce Hall
- Carlos Hall
- Chad Hall
- Charlie Hall (born March 31, 1948)
- Charlie Hall (born December 2, 1948)
- Chris Hall
- Corey Hall
- Cory Hall
- Courtney Hall
- Daeshon Hall
- Dana Hall
- Dante Hall
- Darren Hall
- Darryl Hall (born 1959)
- Darryl Hall (born 1966)
- DeAngelo Hall
- Deiondre' Hall
- Delton Hall
- Derick Hall
- De'von Hall
- Dick Hall
- Dino Hall
- Forrest Hall
- Gabe Hall
- Galen Hall
- Harold Hall
- Harry Hall
- Irv Hall
- James Hall (born 1963)
- James Hall
- Jaren Hall
- Jeff Hall
- John Hall (born 1933)
- John Hall (born 1974)
- Johnny Hall
- Kemon Hall
- Kenneth Hall
- Korey Hall
- Lamont Hall
- Lemanski Hall
- Leon Hall
- Logan Hall
- Mark Hall
- Marvin Hall
- Max Hall
- Mike Hall Jr.
- Nate Hall
- P. J. Hall
- Parker Hall
- Pete Hall
- Randy Hall
- Rannell Hall
- Ray Hall
- Rhett Hall
- Ron Hall (born 1937)
- Ron Hall (born 1964)
- Roy Hall
- Steve Hall
- Terez Hall
- Tim Hall
- Tom Hall
- Travis Hall
- Tyler Hall
- Willie Hall
- Windlan Hall
- Death Halladay
- Neil Halleck
- Paul Halleck
- Bob Hallen
- Alan Haller
- Erick Hallett
- Jack Halliday
- Ty Hallock
- Dimp Halloran
- Shawn Halloran
- Stone Hallquist
- Ron Hallstrom
- Buck Halperin
- Willie Halpern
- Bernie Halstrom
- Aaron Halterman
- Jim Haluska
- Bill Halverson
- Dean Halverson

== Ham–Hap ==
- C. J. Ham
- Derrick Ham
- Jack Ham
- Jack Haman
- Steven Hamas
- Ernie Hambacher
- Darren Hambrick
- Troy Hambrick
- Arlington Hambright
- Mike Hamby
- Gibran Hamdan
- Dean Hamel
- Tex Hamer
- Adrian Hamilton
- Andy Hamilton
- Antonio Hamilton
- Ben Hamilton
- Bobby Hamilton
- Cobi Hamilton
- Conrad Hamilton
- DaeSean Hamilton
- Darrell Hamilton
- DaVon Hamilton
- Derrick Hamilton
- Devery Hamilton
- Harry Hamilton
- Jakar Hamilton
- James Hamilton
- Joe Hamilton
- Justin Hamilton (born 1982)
- Justin Hamilton (born 1993)
- Keith Hamilton
- Kyle Hamilton
- Ladarius Hamilton
- Lawrence Hamilton
- Lynell Hamilton
- Malcolm X. Hamilton
- Marcus Hamilton
- Michael Hamilton
- Ray Hamilton (born 1916)
- Ray Hamilton (born 1951)
- Remy Hamilton
- Rick Hamilton
- Ruffin Hamilton
- Shaun Dion Hamilton
- Skip Hamilton
- Steve Hamilton
- Ty Hamilton
- Wes Hamilton
- Woodrow Hamilton
- Uhuru Hamiter
- K. J. Hamler
- Connor Hamlett
- Damar Hamlin
- Gene Hamlin
- Ken Hamlin
- Michael Hamlin
- Bob Hamm
- Je'Ron Hamm
- Mal Hammack
- Mike Hammerstein
- Ching Hammill
- Bobby Hammond
- Frankie Hammond
- Gary Hammond
- Henry Hammond
- Josh Hammond
- Kim Hammond
- Steve Hammond
- Wayne Hammond
- Shelly Hammonds
- Alonzo Hampton
- Casey Hampton
- Dan Hampton
- Dave Hampton
- Dominique Hampton
- Jermaine Hampton
- Kwante Hampton
- Lorenzo Hampton
- Nick Hampton
- Omarion Hampton
- Rodney Hampton
- Saquan Hampton
- William Hampton
- James Hamrick
- Chris Hanburger
- Blake Hance
- Anthony Hancock
- Jordan Hancock
- Kevin Hancock
- Mike Hancock
- Da'Shawn Hand
- Harrison Hand
- Jon Hand
- Larry Hand
- Norman Hand
- Omari Hand
- Phil Handler
- Dick Handley
- Geoff Hangartner
- Caleb Hanie
- Carl Hanke
- Ray Hanken
- Leonard Hankerson
- Johnathan Hankins
- Ben Hanks
- Merton Hanks
- Cortez Hankton
- Karl Hankton
- Bo Hanley
- Dick Hanley
- Bob Hanlon
- James Hanna
- Jim Hanna
- Zip Hanna
- Charley Hannah
- Herb Hannah
- John Hannah
- Travis Hannah
- Ryan Hannam
- Chuck Hanneman
- Cliff Hanneman
- Craig Hanneman
- Dave Hanner
- Tom Hannon
- Jim Hannula
- Frank Hanny
- Matt Hanousek
- Terry Hanratty
- Russell Hansbrough
- Brian Hansen
- Bruce Hansen
- Carl Hansen
- Chad Hansen
- Chase Hansen
- Cliff Hansen
- Dale Hansen
- Don Hansen
- Hal Hansen
- Jake Hansen
- Phil Hansen
- Ron Hansen
- Roscoe Hansen
- Wayne Hansen
- Tim Hanshaw
- Chris Hanson
- C. J. Hanson
- Dick Hanson
- Hal Hanson (born 1895)
- Hal Hanson (born 1905)
- Homer Hanson
- Jake Hanson
- Jason Hanson
- Joselio Hanson
- Mark Hanson
- Ray Hanson
- Steve Hanson
- Swede Hanson
- Byron Hanspard
- Bob Hantla
- Chet Hanulak
- Patrick Hape
- Merle Hapes

== Har ==
- Parys Haralson
- Jim Harbaugh
- Clay Harbor
- Dave Harbour
- James Harbour
- Buddy Hardaway
- Billy Hardee
- Justin Hardee
- Buddy Hardeman
- Don Hardeman
- Bobby Harden
- Cedric Harden
- Derrick Harden
- Lee Harden
- Michael Harden
- Mike Harden
- Myles Harden
- Pat Harder
- Montario Hardesty
- Steve Hardin
- Greg Harding
- Roger Harding
- Dee Hardison
- Cedrick Hardman
- Derek Hardman
- Mecole Hardman
- Nick Hardwick
- Adrian Hardy
- Andre Hardy
- Bruce Hardy
- Carroll Hardy
- Charlie Hardy
- Cliff Hardy
- Daniel Hardy
- Darryl Hardy
- David Hardy
- Ed Hardy
- Greg Hardy
- Isham Hardy
- James Hardy
- JaQuan Hardy
- Jermaine Hardy
- Jim Hardy
- John Hardy
- Justin Hardy
- Kevin Hardy (born 1945)
- Kevin Hardy (born 1973)
- Larry Hardy
- Richard Hardy
- Robert Hardy (born 1956)
- Robert Hardy (born 1967)
- Terry Hardy
- Cecil Hare
- Eddie Hare
- Ray Hare
- Ramon Harewood
- Tony Hargain
- Edd Hargett
- Javon Hargrave
- Vernon Hargreaves
- Anthony Hargrove
- Jim Hargrove
- Jimmy Hargrove
- Marvin Hargrove
- Cory Harkey
- Lance Harkey
- Lem Harkey
- Steve Harkey
- Jim Harlan
- Chic Harley
- Pat Harlow
- Sean Harlow
- Andy Harmon
- Clarence Harmon
- Derrick Harmon (born 1963)
- Derrick Harmon (born 2003)
- Duron Harmon
- Ed Harmon
- Ham Harmon
- Kelvin Harmon
- Kevin Harmon
- Mike Harmon
- Ronnie Harmon
- Tom Harmon (born 1919)
- Tom Harmon (born 1945)
- Art Harms
- Jim Harness
- Eli Harold
- George Harold
- Alan Harper
- Alvin Harper
- Bruce Harper
- Charlie Harper
- Chris Harper (born 1989)
- Chris Harper (born 1993)
- Darrell Harper
- Dave Harper
- Deveron Harper
- Devin Harper
- Dwayne Harper
- Jack Harper
- Jamie Harper
- John Harper
- Justin Harper
- LaSalle Harper
- Madre Harper
- Mark Harper
- Maurice Harper
- Michael Harper
- Nick Harper
- Roger Harper
- Roland Harper
- Roman Harper
- Shawn Harper
- Thomas Harper
- Willie Harper
- Dennis Harrah
- Charley Harraway
- Gary Harrell
- Graham Harrell
- James Harrell
- Jaylen Harrell
- Justin Harrell
- Rick Harrell
- Sam Harrell
- Willard Harrell
- Chris Harrington
- Joey Harrington
- John Harrington
- LaRue Harrington
- Perry Harrington
- Al Harris (born 1956)
- Al Harris (born 1974)
- Alonzo Harris
- Amos Harris
- Anthony Harris (born 1973)
- Anthony Harris (born 1991)
- Antoine Harris
- Antwan Harris
- Archie Harris
- Arlen Harris
- Atnaf Harris
- Bernardo Harris
- Billy Harris (born 1914)
- Billy Harris (born 1946)
- Bo Harris
- Bob Harris
- Brandon Harris
- Bryce Harris
- Cary Harris
- Charles Harris
- Chris Harris
- Chris Harris, Jr.
- Christian Harris
- Chuck Harris
- Clark Harris
- Cliff Harris
- Corey Harris (born 1969)
- Corey Harris (born 1976)
- DaJohn Harris
- Damien Harris
- Darius Harris
- Darryl Harris
- David Harris
- Davontae Harris
- De'Jon Harris
- Demetrius Harris
- DeMichael Harris
- Demone Harris
- Derrick Harris
- De'Vante Harris
- Dick Harris
- Dominique Harris
- Don Harris
- Dud Harris
- DuJuan Harris
- Duriel Harris
- Dwayne Harris
- Elmore Harris
- Elroy Harris
- Eric Harris
- Erik Harris
- Fatty Harris
- Franco Harris
- Frank Harris
- Gilbert Harris
- Hank Harris
- Harry Harris
- Herbert Harris
- Ike Harris
- Jack Harris
- Jackie Harris
- Jacob Harris
- Jalen Harris
- James Harris (born 1947)
- James Harris (born 1968)
- Jeremy Harris
- Jim Harris
- Jimmy Harris (born 1934)
- Jimmy Harris (born 1946)
- Joe Harris
- Joey Harris
- John Harris (born 1898)
- John Harris (born 1933)
- John Harris (born 1956)
- Johnnie Harris
- Jon Harris
- Jonathan Harris
- Josh Harris (born 1989)
- Josh Harris (born 1991)
- Kay-Jay Harris
- Ken Harris
- Kenny Harris
- Kevin Harris
- Kwame Harris
- Leonard Harris
- Leotis Harris
- Leroy Harris (born 1954)
- Leroy Harris (born 1984)
- Lou Harris
- M. L. Harris
- Marcell Harris
- Macho Harris
- Marcus Harris
- Mark Harris
- Marques Harris
- Marshall Harris
- Marv Harris
- Maurice Harris
- Michael Harris (born 1966)
- Michael Harris (born 1988)
- Mike Harris (born 1989)
- Najee Harris
- Napoleon Harris
- Nate Harris
- Nic Harris
- Nick Harris (born 1978)
- Nick Harris (born 1998)
- Nigel Harris
- Odie Harris
- Orien Harris
- Paul Harris
- Phil Harris
- Quentin Harris
- Ra'Shon Harris
- Raymont Harris
- Richard Harris
- Rickie Harris
- Robert Harris
- Rod Harris
- Ronnie Harris
- Roy Harris
- Rudy Harris
- Ryan Harris
- Sean Harris
- Shelby Harris
- Steve Harris
- Steven Harris
- Tim Harris (born 1961)
- Tim Harris (born 1964)
- Tim Harris (born 1995)
- Tommie Harris
- Tony Harris
- Tre Harris
- Trent Harris
- Tuff Harris
- Walt Harris (born 1964)
- Walt Harris (born 1974)
- Wendell Harris
- Will Harris
- William Harris
- Anthony Harrison
- Anton Harrison
- Arnold Harrison
- Bob Harrison (born 1937)
- Bob Harrison (born 1938)
- Brandon Harrison
- Chris Harrison
- Damon Harrison
- Dennis Harrison
- Desmond Harrison
- Dick Harrison
- Dwight Harrison
- Ed Harrison
- Glynn Harrison
- Gran Harrison
- James Harrison
- Jerome Harrison
- Jim Harrison
- Jonotthan Harrison
- Kenny Harrison
- Kevin Harrison
- Lloyd Harrison
- Malik Harrison
- Marcus Harrison
- Martin Harrison
- Marvin Harrison
- Marvin Harrison Jr.
- Max Harrison
- Nolan Harrison
- Pat Harrison
- Reggie Harrison
- Rob Harrison
- Rodney Harrison
- Ronnie Harrison
- Todd Harrison
- Tyreo Harrison
- Vic Harrison
- Zach Harrison
- Carl Harry
- Emile Harry
- N'Keal Harry
- Ben Hart
- Bobby Hart
- Cam Hart
- Clinton Hart
- Derek Hart
- Dick Hart
- Doug Hart
- Harold Hart
- Jeff Hart
- Jim Hart
- Larry Hart
- Lawrence Hart
- Leo Hart
- Leon Hart
- Les Hart
- Mike Hart
- Penny Hart
- Pete Hart
- Roy Hart
- Taylor Hart
- Tommy Hart
- Montre Hartage
- Mike Hartenstine
- Trevon Hartfield
- Jeff Hartings
- Greg Hartle
- Frank Hartley
- Garrett Hartley
- Howard Hartley
- Ken Hartley
- Brian Hartline
- Bill Hartman
- Fred Hartman
- Jim Hartman
- Tysyn Hartman
- Brett Hartmann
- Perry Hartnett
- George Hartong
- Shaunard Harts
- Mark Hartsell
- Myles Hartsfield
- Larry Hartshorn
- Ben Hartsock
- Edgerton Hartwell
- Carter Hartwig
- Justin Hartwig
- Keith Hartwig
- Deonte Harty
- John Harty
- Bug Hartzog
- Claude Harvey
- Derrick Harvey
- Frank Harvey
- George Harvey
- Jahfari Harvey
- James Harvey
- Jim Harvey
- John Harvey
- Ken Harvey
- Mario Harvey
- Marvin Harvey
- Maurice Harvey
- Norm Harvey
- Richard Harvey (born 1945)
- Richard Harvey (born 1966)
- RJ Harvey
- Stacy Harvey
- Waddey Harvey
- Willie Harvey
- Josh Harvey-Clemons
- Allen Harvin
- Percy Harvin
- Pressley Harvin III

== Has–Haz ==
- John Hasbrouck
- Carlton Haselrig
- George Hasenohrl
- Dwayne Haskins
- Hassan Haskins
- Jon Haskins
- Kevin Haslam
- Clint Haslerig
- Jim Haslett
- Wilbert Haslip
- Mike Hass
- Harald Hasselbach
- Don Hasselbeck
- Matt Hasselbeck
- Tim Hasselbeck
- J. T. Hassell
- J. C. Hassenauer
- Andre Hastings
- Andy Hastings
- George Hastings
- Joe Hastings
- James Hasty
- Jamycal Hasty
- Jeff Hatch
- Armon Hatcher
- Dale Hatcher
- Jason Hatcher
- Keon Hatcher
- Ron Hatcher
- Derrick Hatchett
- Matthew Hatchette
- Dominique Hatfield
- Russ Hathaway
- Steve Hathaway
- Dave Hathcock
- Johnny Hatley
- Rickey Hatley
- Hogan Hatten
- Tim Hauck
- Steven Hauschka
- Art Hauser
- Earl Hauser
- Ken Hauser
- Len Hauss
- Charlie Havens
- Rob Havenstein
- Dave Haverdick
- Kevin Haverdink
- Dennis Havig
- Stanley Havili
- Spencer Havner
- Sam Havrilak
- Lucas Havrisik
- Jackson Hawes
- A. J. Hawk
- Michael Hawkes
- Alex Hawkins
- Andrew Hawkins
- Andy Hawkins
- Artrell Hawkins
- Ben Hawkins
- Bill Hawkins
- Brent Hawkins
- Chris Hawkins
- Clarence Hawkins
- Courtney Hawkins
- Donald Hawkins
- Frank Hawkins
- Garland Hawkins
- Jaylinn Hawkins
- Jerald Hawkins
- Josh Hawkins
- Lavelle Hawkins
- Mike Hawkins (born 1955)
- Mike Hawkins (born 1983)
- Nate Hawkins
- Rip Hawkins
- Steve Hawkins
- Tayler Hawkins
- Tre Hawkins
- Wayne Hawkins
- Tanner Hawkinson
- Joe Hawley
- Steve Haworth
- Kurt Haws
- Les Haws
- Anttaj Hawthorne
- David Hawthorne
- Duane Hawthorne
- Ed Hawthorne
- Greg Hawthorne
- Michael Hawthorne
- Matthew Hayball
- Ken Haycraft
- Aaron Hayden
- D. J. Hayden
- Kelvin Hayden
- Ken Hayden
- Leo Hayden
- Nick Hayden
- Henry Hayduk
- Jovan Haye
- Billie Hayes
- Bob Hayes
- Brandon Hayes
- Chris Hayes
- Daelin Hayes
- Dave Hayes
- Donald Hayes
- Ed Hayes
- Eric Hayes
- Gary Hayes
- Geno Hayes
- Gerald Hayes
- Jarius Hayes
- Jeff Hayes
- Jim Hayes
- Joe Hayes
- Jonathan Hayes
- Josh Hayes
- Larry Hayes
- Lester Hayes
- Luther Hayes
- Melvin Hayes
- Mercury Hayes
- Norbert Hayes
- Ray Hayes
- Raymond Hayes
- Rudy Hayes
- Ryan Hayes
- Tae Hayes
- Tom Hayes
- Wendell Hayes
- William Hayes
- Windrell Hayes
- Herb Haygood
- Bill Hayhoe
- Conway Hayman
- Gary Hayman
- Alvin Haymond
- Jarryd Hayne
- Abner Haynes
- Alex Haynes
- Christian Haynes
- Hall Haynes
- James Haynes
- Joe Haynes
- Louis Haynes
- Mark Haynes
- Marquis Haynes
- Michael Haynes (born 1965)
- Michael Haynes (born 1980)
- Mike Haynes
- Phil Haynes
- Reggie Haynes
- Tommy Haynes
- Verron Haynes
- Albert Haynesworth
- Joey Haynos
- George Hays
- Harold Hays
- Adam Hayward
- Casey Hayward
- Reggie Hayward
- Al Haywood
- Tracy Hayworth
- Matt Hazel
- Paul Hazel
- Robert Hazelhurst
- Matt Hazeltine
- Major Hazelton
- Ted Hazelwood
- Jeff Hazuga

== Hea–Henn ==
- Andy Headen
- Sherrill Headrick
- Ed Healey
- Chip Healy
- Don Healy
- Joe Heap
- Todd Heap
- Walt Heap
- Herman Heard
- Kellen Heard
- Ronnie Heard
- Lester Hearden
- Tom Hearden
- Taylor Hearn
- Garrison Hearst
- Don Heater
- Larry Heater
- Red Heater
- Clayton Heath
- Jeff Heath
- Joel Heath
- Jo Jo Heath
- Leon Heath
- Malik Heath
- Rodney Heath
- Stan Heath
- T. J. Heath
- Bobby Hebert
- Bud Hebert
- Ken Hebert
- Kyries Hebert
- Vaughn Hebron
- George Hecht
- Andy Heck
- Bob Heck
- Charlie Heck
- Ralph Heck
- Steve Heckard
- Norb Hecker
- Robert Hecker
- Bruce Hector
- Johnny Hector
- Willie Hector
- Randy Hedberg
- Madison Hedgecock
- Lou Hedley
- Pat Heenan
- Ben Heeney
- Gene Heeter
- Shawn Heffern
- Dave Heffernan
- Jack Heflin
- Victor Heflin
- Vince Heflin
- Larry Hefner
- George Hegamin
- Bill Hegarty
- Mike Hegman
- Jimmy Heidel
- Steve Heiden
- Ralph Heikkinen
- Charles Heileman
- Craig Heimburger
- Steve Heimkreiter
- Johnny Heimsch
- Lakei Heimuli
- Bob Hein
- Mel Hein
- Ken Heineman
- Taylor Heinicke
- Fritz Heinisch
- Pete Heinlein
- Don Heinrich
- Keith Heinrich
- Bob Heinz
- Eric Heitmann
- Johnny Hekker
- George Hekkers
- Paul Held
- Carl Heldt
- Jack Heldt
- Cooper Helfet
- DeMarcco Hellams
- Ron Heller (born 1962)
- Ron Heller (born 1963)
- Warren Heller
- Will Heller
- Dale Hellestrae
- Jerry Helluin
- Daniel Helm
- Gunnar Helm
- Jack Helms
- Barry Helton
- Darius Helton
- Roy Helu
- Chuck Helvie
- John Helwig
- Junior Hemingway
- Temarrick Hemingway
- Tonka Hemingway
- Bill Hempel
- Darryl Hemphill
- Hessley Hempstead
- Nate Hemsley
- Andy Hendel
- Larry Hendershot
- Peyton Hendershot
- C. J. Henderson
- Darrell Henderson
- De'Angelo Henderson
- Devery Henderson
- E. J. Henderson
- Eric Henderson
- Erin Henderson
- Herb Henderson
- Jamie Henderson
- Jerome Henderson
- John Henderson (born 1943)
- John Henderson (born 1979)
- Jon Henderson
- Keith Henderson
- Mario Henderson
- Othello Henderson
- Quadree Henderson
- Reuben Henderson
- Seantrel Henderson
- Thomas Henderson
- Trayvon Henderson
- TreVeyon Henderson
- Wilbur Henderson
- William Henderson
- Wyatt Henderson
- Wymon Henderson
- Zac Henderson
- David Hendley
- Dick Hendley
- Jim Hendley
- Bob Hendren
- Jerry Hendren
- Johnny Hendren
- Dutch Hendrian
- Dwayne Hendricks
- Ted Hendricks
- Tommy Hendricks
- Steve Hendrickson
- Trey Hendrickson
- David Hendrix
- Manny Hendrix
- Tim Hendrix
- A. J. Hendy
- John Hendy
- Alex Henery
- Brian Henesey
- Brad William Henke
- Ed Henke
- Karl Henke
- Carey Henley
- Daiyan Henley
- Darryl Henley
- June Henley
- Thomas Henley
- Chad Henne
- Nick Hennessey
- Tom Hennessey
- Jerry Hennessy
- John Hennessy
- Matt Hennessy
- Thomas Hennessy
- Charlie Hennigan
- Mike Hennigan
- Dan Henning
- Chad Hennings
- Matt Henningsen
