= Fearsome Foursome (American football) =

Title given to dominating defensive lines in American football

The term "Fearsome Foursome" as applied in professional football in the United States has been used as a nickname for the defensive lines of the New York Giants and Baltimore Colts of the late 1950s in the National Football League (NFL), the San Diego Chargers of the early 1960s in the American Football League (AFL), the Detroit Lions of the early to mid-1960s, and various Los Angeles Rams' defensive lines of the 1960s and 1970s in the NFL.

The term has also been used more generically to describe a top team's high performing defensive line. In a 1972 Boston Globe article, a chart of "Famous 'Fearsome Foursomes'" was included that compared the Chargers and Rams who had the Fearsome Foursome nickname, but also included, the 1968 era Green Bay Packers' line, and the defensive lines of the Dallas Cowboys (the "Doomsday Defense"), Minnesota Vikings ("Purple People Eaters"), Kansas City Chiefs and San Francisco 49ers of the 1970s. Sportswriter John Crittenden said in 1975 there had been a dozen defensive lines known as fearsome foursomes.

== New York Giants ==
The New York Giants Fearsome Foursome consisting of ends Andy Robustelli and Jim Katcavage, and tackles Rosey Grier and Dick Modzelewski, first played together on the Giants 1956 NFL Championship Team. They were considered pioneers in inaugurating a defensive era in professional football. The Giants' Fearsome Foursome broke up as a group before the start of the 1963 season, when the Giants traded Grier to the Los Angeles Rams for John LoVetere.

Other than during Grier's Army service in 1957, and a period of injury for Katcavage at the end of the 1960 season, the four played together in every minute of every game from 1956 to 1962. Robustelli is in the Pro Football Hall of Fame. In addition to winning the championship in 1956, the Giants went to four other NFL championship games, losing to the Baltimore Colts in 1958 (known as "the Greatest Game Ever Played"), and 1959 and the Green Bay Packers in 1961 and 1962. They were "largely responsible" for the Giants' success during these years.

In the 1957 season the New York Daily News, a major New York city tabloid, ran an article and sketches of the New York Giants' line consisting of ends Andy Robustelli and Jim Katcavage, and tackles Rosey Grier and Dick Modzelewski and a headline that read "A Fearsome Foursome." They were known as the Fearsome Foursome by at least 1959, supported by an actual photograph of the four.

== Baltimore Colts ==
The Baltimore Colts defensive line that included future Hall of Famers defensive end Gino Marchetti and tackle Art Donovan, along with end Don Joyce and tackle Eugene "Big Daddy" Lipscomb has also been referred to as the "'fearsome foursome'" by at least 1958. They have been called the prototype of defensive lines. In addition to Marchetti’s and Donovan’s Hall of Fame status, Lipscomb was first-team All-Pro in 1958 and 1959. Marchetti is considered among the greatest defensive ends in NFL history. The Colts won the 1958 and 1959 NFL championships over the New York Giants, the 1958 game being known as "The Greatest Game Ever Played". They played together as a line from 1956 to 1960, with defensive end Ordell Braase taking over as a starter for Joyce in 1960, and Lipscomb being traded to the Steelers before the start of the 1961 season.

== Detroit Lions ==
It has been said that Detroit Lions' announcer Van Patrick applied the nickname "Fearsome Foursome" to the Lions front four as early as 1960, when the Lion defensive line consisted of ends Bill Glass and Darris McCord, and tackles Alex Karras and Roger Brown. Other reports state that sportswriter Bruno Kerns of the Pontiac Press first used the Fearsome Four nickname for the Lions' defensive line in 1960. The Fearsome Foursome name for the Lions' defensive line continued after Sam Williams replaced Glass in 1962; Glass being traded to the Cleveland Browns for quarterback Milt Plum after the 1961 season. Other than 1963, McCord, Karras, Brown and Williams started together from 1962 through 1965; until Williams was taken by the Atlanta Falcons in the 1966 expansion draft. Karras missed the 1963 season as he was suspended in connection with alleged gambling.

Their most well-known game was the 1962 "Thanksgiving Day Massacre" game against the Green Bay Packers, where they sacked Bart Starr 11 times (seven by Brown) and broke the Packers 12-game winning streak. The group's early defensive coordinator was future Pro Football Hall of Fame head coach Don Shula. Karras is in the Pro Football Hall of Fame. The 6 ft 5 in (1.96 m) 300 pound (136 kg) Brown, was one of the first NFL lineman to play at 300 pounds or more, with the speed and agility to make him highly effective at that weight. Brown was named to the Pro Bowl as a Lion from 1962 through 1966 and first-team All-Pro twice (1962-63).

== San Diego Chargers ==
The nickname "Fearsome Foursome" was used to describe the early 1960s American Football League's San Diego Chargers' defensive front four. One report is the nickname was originally used for the Chargers line by the team's press agent Bob Burdick, in 1963. The Fearsome Foursome name, however, was used by at least the early 1962 season for the line consisting of right defensive end Ron Nery, left defensive end Earl Faison, left defensive tackle Bill Hudson and right defensive tackle Ernie Ladd. A November 1961 newspaper article about this same Chargers’ defensive line is entitled “Fearsome Foursome Averages 273”.

The Chargers moved from Los Angeles to San Diego in 1961, Faison's and Ladd's rookie season. Faison and Ladd would be the core of the Chargers' Fearsome Foursome from 1961 to 1965. Contract disputes with the Chargers led to Faison and Ladd leaving the team in 1966, with Ladd playing the 1966 season for the Houston Oilers, and Faison playing in only three games for the Chargers before going to the Miami Dolphins.

Faison was an AFL All-Star in his first five seasons with the Chargers (1961-65), and was All-AFL every year but 1962. He was the only defensive player to ever win the Associated Press (AP) and The Sporting News AFL Rookie of the Year during the AFL's existence (1960-69), and one of only two defensemen to win United Press International's (UPI) AFL Rookie of the Year. The 6 ft 9 in (2.06 m), 290 lb. (131.5 kg) Ladd, the tallest player in professional football, was All-AFL three times (1961, 1964-65) and an AFL All-Star from 1962 to 1965. Nery and Hudson played with Faison and Ladd in 1961 and 1962, Hudson being named an All-Star in 1961, and Nery selected All-AFL in 1962.

Faison and Ladd were later joined by right defensive end Bob Petrich (1963-65), defensive tackle George Gross (1963-65), and Henry Schmidt who had been a reserve lineman and then had starter roles at tackle and end (1961-65). At the time Gross and Ladd were two of the largest and strongest men in professional football. From 1961 to 1965, the Chargers played in four of the five AFL Championship games, winning the 1963 AFL Championship Game, 51–10, over the Boston Patriots.

== Los Angeles Rams ==
=== 1963-1967 ===
In 1963, the Los Angeles Rams acquired Rosey Grier from the New York Giants to play right defensive tackle. Grier joined Lamar Lundy (right defensive end), and future Hall of Famers Merlin Olsen (left defensive tackle) and Deacon Jones (left defensive end) on the team's starting defensive line. In 1964, the Rams' publicity office began using the "Fearsome Foursome" name to describe the team's defensive line, reportedly following the Chargers example. It was the Rams' Fearsome Foursome, however, that became the standard by which future teams' defensive lines were measured. Hall of Fame linebacker, and one of the NFL's greatest defensive players, Dick Butkus called them "the most dominant line in football history." The Associated Press’s obituary of Jones called the Rams line unblockable at times, and reported descriptions of Jones as the paradigm for all the great defensive ends that followed, an “icon among icons” and the “‘greatest defensive end of modern football’”.

Grier missed the 1967 season with a ruptured Achilles tendon (and retired before the 1968 season). In September 1967, the Rams traded three high draft choices, including the Rams No. 1 pick in the 1968 draft, to the Detroit Lions for the Lions' Fearsome Four tackle Roger Brown to replace Grier. Brown joined the Rams' Fearsome Foursome, where he played with Jones, Olsen and Lundy from 1967 to 1969. Brown made the Pro Bowl in 1967 (his sixth consecutive appearance). On July 31, 1968, the Rams traded the fifth round draft choice (#125-Chuck Kyle) in exchange for defensive tackle Coy Bacon.In 2018, USA Today Sportswriter Jim Reineking rated the 1967 Rams line as the greatest ever.

=== 1968-71 ===
Lundy played in only five games in 1968 and four in 1969 to end his career. In 1968, Gregg Schumacher started nine games in Lundy's place, with 8.5 sacks. Schumacher suffered a knee injury during training camp the following year, and never played again in the NFL. Third-year player Diron Talbert replaced Schumacher and became the starting right defensive end in 1969. Brown suffered a broken hand in 1969, his final NFL season, and split time at tackle with second-year player Coy Bacon. In 1970, Talbert would take over Brown's spot at right tackle, and Bacon would become the starting right defensive end.

The greater publicity garnered by the NFL leads many to assume incorrectly the Rams were the original Fearsome Foursome, before the Chargers. The Rams' Fearsome Foursome's first three years came under head coach Harland Svare, who had played linebacker behind the Giants' Fearsome Foursome during his playing days. The Rams best record under Svare was 5–7–2 during that time, and the team had not been over .500 since 1959. Starting in 1966, the Rams became playoff contenders under coach George Allen, who had a 49–17–4 record from 1966 to 1970 with the Rams. They had a league best record of 11–1–2 in 1967, and reached the playoffs twice during Allen's tenure. From 1963-70, the line averaged 44 quarterback sacks per year, and led the NFL in rushing defense three times from 1964 to 1968, showing excellence in both pass and run defense.

The line was ultimately broken up after 1971, George Allen having become coach of the Washington Redskins in 1971. Talbert and Jones left in 1972, with Talbert following Allen to the Redskins, and Jones going to the Chargers for two years before eventually reuniting with Allen himself on the Redskins in 1974. Bacon left in 1973. Olsen finished his 15-season career with the Rams in 1976, starting all 14 games every season from 1963 to 1976.

=== Reconstituted Fearsome Foursome and rejecting name ===
After missing the playoffs from 1970 to 1972, the Rams won seven straight division titles from 1973 to 1979, which was an NFL record until 2016 when broken by the New England Patriots.

Those Rams teams were led in part by a reconstituted "new" Fearsome Foursome. This line consisted of ends Jack Youngblood and Fred Dryer, and tackles Olsen and Larry Brooks. Youngblood played for the Rams from 1971 to 1984, Brooks from 1972 to 1982, and Dryer from 1972 to 1981. Olsen, who played with his brother Phil Olsen for 4 seasons from 1971 to 1974, retired after a 15-year career at the end of the 1976 season. Olsen was replaced by Cody Jones in 1977-78. Jones suffered an Achilles tendon injury and missed the 1979 season, being replaced by Mike Fanning in 1979. Jones was the starter at right defensive tackle again in 1980.

Brooks, Youngblood and Dryer, however, rejected the name Fearsome Foursome as applied to themselves, considering it unnecessary. Youngblood thought it amounted to gratuitous showmanship and the Rams' defensive players believed the team's play, not its name, was the only thing that had actual meaning. Thus, the defensively excellent 1978 team, which gave up the league’s fewest total yards and fewest passing yards, was not even considered to have a nickname, unlike the "Doomsday Defense" or "Steel Curtain".

Youngblood, Dryer, Brooks and Fanning started in Super Bowl XIV following the 1979 season. Youngblood and Olsen are NFL Hall of Famers while Brooks made the Pro Bowl 5 times. Dryer, acquired from the Giants in 1972, also made the Pro Bowl once, and set an NFL record with 2 safeties in one game against the Packers. Jones made the 1978 Pro Bowl team.

The line was documented in NFL Network's A Football Life, and was narrated by Josh Charles.

== See also ==
- List of American Football League players
