= Earl Faison =

American football player (1939–2016)

No. 86, 84
- Position: Defensive end

Personal information
- Born: January 31, 1939; Newport News, Virginia, U.S.
- Died: June 12, 2016 (aged 77); Prescott, Arizona, U.S.
- Listed height: 6 ft 5 in (1.96 m)
- Listed weight: 270 lb (122 kg)

Career information
- High school: Huntington (Newport News)
- College: Indiana (1957–1960)
- NFL draft: 1961: 5th round, 66th overall pick
- AFL draft: 1961: 1st round, 7th overall pick

Career history
- San Diego Chargers (1961–1966); Miami Dolphins (1966)

Awards and highlights
- AFL champion (1963); 4× First-team All-AFL (1961, 1963–1965); Second-team All-AFL (1962); 5× AFL All-Star (1961–1965); AFL Rookie of the Year (1961); Los Angeles Chargers Hall of Fame; San Diego Chargers 50th Anniversary Team; All-American (1960); First-team All-Big Ten (1960); Second-team All-Big Ten (1959); Indiana University Hall of Fame

Career AFL statistics
- Interceptions: 6
- Touchdowns: 3
- Sacks: 31
- Stats at Pro Football Reference

Earl Faison (January 31, 1939 – June 12, 2016) was an American professional football player who was a defensive end in the American Football League (AFL) between 1960 and 1966. He spent most of his career with the San Diego Chargers.

== Career ==
Drafted by both the Detroit Lions of the National Football League and the Los Angeles Chargers of the AFL, Faison signed with the Chargers as a first-round pick immediately after the conclusion of the East–West Shrine Game on December 31, 1960.

The 6-foot-5, 260 pound Faison had been an All-American at Indiana University, playing on both offense and defense. After entering the pro ranks, he worked with Chargers' assistant coach Chuck Noll to continually blow past opposing offensive lineman on his way to smashing American Football League quarterbacks.

Faison was a member of the original "Fearsome Foursome" (the Chargers' defensive line) from 1961 to 1966. The "Foursome" was made up of Faison and Chargers Hall of Fame linemate Ernie Ladd, with alternate members of the group including Bob Petrich, Ron Nery, George Gross, Bill Hudson and Henry Schmidt.

Despite often being double and triple-teamed, Faison was chosen as the American Football League Rookie of the Year and All-AFL in 1961. He missed the early portion of the 1962 season, after suffering a knee injury, then reported late the following year after a contract dispute. The contract problems would resurface in 1965, but his performance remained good enough to continue a string of five consecutive All-Star seasons in the league from 1961 to 1965.

On January 15, 1966, Faison and Ladd were dealt to the Houston Oilers as part of a five-player trade, but four days later, the trade was nullified because of tampering by Oilers' owner Bud Adams. In response, Faison looked to the Canadian Football League's Toronto Argonauts, but eventually signed a three-year, $90,000 contract with the Chargers on July 29.

The bitter contract problems, coupled with Faison's back problems, continued to linger until October 18 when Faison was released by the Chargers. In announcing the dismissal, head coach Sid Gillman bitterly noted that Faison, "has a long way to go to become average." One day later, the expansion Miami Dolphins signed Faison for the remainder of the year.

On June 27, 1967, Faison was involved in a seven-player trade which sent him to the Denver Broncos, although 10 days later, the team returned him to the Dolphins, who then placed him on waivers on July 24. Faison's release led him to file a lawsuit against Miami on October 6, citing breach of contract. Claiming his three-year contract entitled him to the remaining $60,000 over two years, Faison was ultimately unsuccessful in his lawsuit.

A member of the Chargers Hall of Fame, Faison was also inducted into the Indiana University Hall of Fame in 1990. In his post-playing career, Faison briefly dabbled in acting, including Kolchak: The Night Stalker and a pair of appearances in The Beverly Hillbillies. He then returned to California as an educator and football coach, and while at Lincoln High School, he served as head coach during the era of future Pro Football Hall of Famer Marcus Allen before eventually serving as the school's principal. He later coached P.E. at Muirlands Junior High School in La Jolla. It was there that he coined the term "grabasser" for unruly students. Faison later went on to become the Vice Principal at University City High School in San Diego.

Earl Faison is a member of The Pigskin Club Of Washington, D.C. National Intercollegiate All-American Football Players Honor Roll.

In 1997, Faison was also inducted by the San Diego Hall of Champions into the Breitbard Hall of Fame honoring San Diego's finest athletes both on and off the playing surface. Faison was inducted into the Virginia Sports Hall of Fame in 1989.

He died on June 12, 2016, in Prescott, Arizona.

== See also ==
- Other American Football League players
