= Cliff Hansen =

Cliff Hansen may refer to:

- Clifford Hansen (1912–2009), American politician from Wyoming
- J. Clifford Hansen (1893–1967), mayor of Murray, Utah
- Cliff Hansen (American football) (1910–2001), American football player
