= Wayne Hammond =

Wayne Hammond is the name of

- Wayne Hammond (field hockey) (born 1948), Australian field hockey player
- Wayne Hammond (American football) (born 1953), American football player
- Wayne G. Hammond (born 1953), Tolkien scholar
