= List of NFL players (Henr–Hy) =

This is a list of players who have appeared in at least one regular season or postseason game in the National Football League (NFL), American Football League (AFL), or All-America Football Conference (AAFC) and have a last name that falls between "Henr" and "Hy". For the rest of the H's, see list of NFL players (Ha–Henn). This list is accurate through the end of the 2025 NFL season.

== Henr–Hey ==
- Ralph Henricus
- Anthony Henry
- Bernard Henry
- Charles Henry
- Chas Henry
- Chris Henry (born 1983)
- Chris Henry (born 1985)
- Derrick Henry
- Fritz Henry
- Hunter Henry
- K.J. Henry
- Kevin Henry
- Leonard Henry
- Marcus Henry
- Maurice Henry
- Mike Henry
- Mitchell Henry
- Pete Henry
- Ricky Henry
- Steve Henry
- Tom Henry
- Travis Henry
- Urban Henry
- Wally Henry
- Wilbur Henry
- Willie Henry
- Dick Hensley
- Champ Henson
- Drew Henson
- Gary Henson
- Ken Henson
- Luther Henson
- Robert Henson
- Hale Hentges
- Anthony Henton
- Craig Hentrich
- Lonnie Hepburn
- Kris Heppner
- Arnie Herber
- Justin Herbert
- Khalil Herbert
- Nate Herbig
- Nick Herbig
- Bill Herchman
- Kyle Hergel
- Joe Hergert
- Matt Herkenhoff
- Al Herline
- Chuck Herman
- Dave Herman
- Ed Herman
- Dick Hermann
- Johnny Hermann
- Grant Hermanns
- Terry Hermeling
- Aaron Hernandez
- Joe Hernandez
- Matt Hernandez
- Scott Hernandez
- Will Hernandez
- Chris Herndon
- Don Herndon
- Javontee Herndon
- Jimmy Herndon
- Kelly Herndon
- Steve Herndon
- Tre Herndon
- Ken Herock
- Fred Heron
- Brian Herosian
- Todd Herremans
- Amarlo Herrera
- Anthony Herrera
- Efren Herrera
- Hoot Herrin
- George Herring
- Hal Herring
- Kim Herring
- Malik Herring
- Will Herring
- Don Herrmann
- Mark Herrmann
- Jeff Herrod
- Anthony Herron
- Bruce Herron
- Dan Herron
- David Herron
- Frank Herron
- Justin Herron
- Mack Herron
- Noah Herron
- Pat Herron
- Robert Herron
- Kirk Hershey
- Rob Hertel
- Craig Hertwig
- Frank Hertz
- Mark Herzlich
- Gavin Heslop
- Wally Hess
- Jon Hesse
- Parker Hesse
- Devin Hester
- Jacob Hester
- Jessie Hester
- Jimmy Hester
- Ray Hester
- Ron Hester
- Treyvon Hester
- Chris Hetherington
- Dave Hettema
- Jeff Heuerman
- Bill Hewitt
- Chris Hewitt
- Neville Hewitt
- Ryan Hewitt
- Bob Hewko
- Bob Hews
- Stephon Heyer
- Cameron Heyward
- Connor Heyward
- Craig Heyward
- Shaka Heyward
- Darrius Heyward-Bey
- Ralph Heywood

== Hi ==
- Jesse Hibbs
- Mike Hibler
- Gene Hickerson
- Bo Hickey
- Red Hickey
- Ray Hickl
- Dallas Hickman
- Donnie Hickman
- Herman Hickman
- Justin Hickman
- Kevin Hickman
- Larry Hickman
- Ronnie Hickman
- Akiem Hicks
- Artis Hicks
- Brandon Hicks
- Bryan Hicks
- Cliff Hicks
- Dwight Hicks
- Dwone Hicks
- Eddie Hicks
- Elijah Hicks
- Eric Hicks
- Faion Hicks
- Ivan Hicks
- Jaden Hicks
- John Hicks
- Jordan Hicks
- Kerry Hicks
- LaMarcus Hicks
- Mark Hicks
- Maurice Hicks
- Max Hicks
- Michael Hicks
- R.W. Hicks
- Robert Hicks
- Skip Hicks
- Sylvester Hicks
- Tom Hicks
- Victor Hicks
- W. K. Hicks
- Ed Hiemstra
- Tyler Higbee
- Alex Higdon
- Austin Higgins
- Bob Higgins
- Elijah Higgins
- J. B. Higgins
- Jay Higgins
- Jayden Higgins
- Jim Higgins
- Johnnie Lee Higgins
- Luke Higgins
- Michael Higgins
- Rashard Higgins
- Tee Higgins
- Tom Higgins (born 1930)
- Tom Higgins (born 1954)
- Mark Higgs
- Lenny High
- Alex Highsmith
- Ali Highsmith
- Alonzo Highsmith
- Buzz Highsmith
- Don Highsmith
- Ben Hightower
- Dont'a Hightower
- John Hightower
- Tim Hightower
- Cole Hikutini
- Jon Hilbert
- Van Hiles
- Jay Hilgenberg
- Joel Hilgenberg
- Wally Hilgenberg
- Rusty Hilger
- Anthony Hill
- Barry Hill
- Bill Hill
- B.J. Hill
- Bob Hill
- Brandon Hill
- Brian Hill
- Bronson Hill
- Bruce Hill
- Calvin Hill
- Charles Hill
- Charley Hill
- Chuck Hill
- Cowboy Hill
- Darius Hill
- Darrell Hill
- Dave Hill
- David Hill
- Daxton Hill
- Derek Hill
- Don Hill
- Drew Hill
- Eddie Hill
- Eric Hill
- Fred Hill
- Gary Hill
- Greg Hill (born 1961)
- Greg Hill (born 1972)
- Harlon Hill
- Harold Hill
- Holton Hill
- Ike Hill
- Irv Hill
- J. D. Hill
- Jack Hill
- Jamal Hill
- James Hill
- Jason Hill
- Jaylen Hill
- Jeff Hill
- Jeremy Hill
- Jerry Hill
- Jim Hill (born 1929)
- Jim Hill (born 1946)
- Jimmy Hill
- John Hill
- Jordan Hill
- Josh Hill
- Julian Hill
- Justice Hill
- K.J. Hill
- Kahlil Hill
- Kenny Hill
- Kent Hill
- Kid Hill
- King Hill
- Kylin Hill
- Lano Hill
- LeRoy Hill
- Lonzell Hill
- Mack Lee Hill
- Madre Hill
- Marquise Hill
- Matt Hill
- Michael Hill
- Nate Hill
- Raion Hill
- Ralph Hill
- Randal Hill
- Rashod Hill
- Ray Hill
- Renaldo Hill
- Reynaldo Hill
- Rod Hill
- Sammie Lee Hill
- Sean Hill
- Shaun Hill
- Stephen Hill
- Taysom Hill
- Tony Hill (born 1956)
- Tony Hill (born 1968)
- Travis Hill
- Trey Hill
- Troy Hill
- Trysten Hill
- Tye Hill
- Tyreek Hill
- Will Hill (born 1963)
- Will Hill (born 1990)
- Winston Hill
- Darius Hillary
- Ira Hillary
- Jerry Hillebrand
- Billy Hillenbrand
- Hunter Hillenmeyer
- Andy Hillhouse
- Corey Hilliard
- Dalton Hilliard
- Dontrell Hilliard
- Ike Hilliard
- Jason Hilliard
- John Hilliard
- Justin Hilliard
- Lex Hilliard
- Randy Hilliard
- Jon Hilliman
- Peyton Hillis
- Bill Hillman
- Ronnie Hillman
- Keno Hills
- Tony Hills
- Wes Hills
- Hal Hilpirt
- Carl Hilton
- John Hilton
- Mike Hilton
- Roy Hilton
- Scott Hilton
- T. Y. Hilton
- Zach Hilton
- Dick Himes
- Curly Hinchman
- Stan Hindman
- Andre Hines
- D'Juan Hines
- Glen Ray Hines
- Jermale Hines
- Jim Hines
- Nyheim Hines
- Josh Hines-Allen
- Kurt Hinish
- Bryan Hinkle
- Clarke Hinkle
- George Hinkle
- Jack Hinkle
- Mike Hinnant
- Hal Hinte
- Chris Hinton
- Christopher Hinton
- Chuck Hinton (born 1939)
- Chuck Hinton (born 1942)
- Eddie Hinton
- Grassy Hinton
- Kendall Hinton
- Kyle Hinton
- Marcus Hinton
- Mike Hintz
- Sam Hipa
- I. M. Hipp
- Eric Hipple
- Claude Hipps
- Doug Hire
- Buckets Hirsch
- Elroy Hirsch
- Steve Hirsch
- Bill Hitchcock
- Jimmy Hitchcock
- Ray Hitchcock
- Anthony Hitchens
- Joel Hitt
- Billy Hix
- Domenik Hixon

== Hoa–Hol ==
- Terry Hoage
- Fred Hoaglin
- Joe Hoague
- Dick Hoak
- Leroy Hoard
- Mike Hoban
- Jim Hobbins
- Bill Hobbs
- Daryl Hobbs
- Ellis Hobbs
- Homer Hobbs
- Kevin Hobbs
- Nate Hobbs
- Stephen Hobbs
- Marion Hobby
- Billy Joe Hobert
- Nate Hobgood-Chittick
- Liffort Hobley
- Fred Hobscheid
- Ben Hobson
- Victor Hobson
- Russ Hochstein
- John Hock
- T. J. Hockenson
- Zach Hocker
- Merwin Hodel
- Nathan Hodel
- Drew Hodgdon
- Abdul Hodge
- Damon Hodge
- Darius Hodge
- Floyd Hodge
- KhaDarel Hodge
- Milford Hodge
- Sedrick Hodge
- Cooper Hodges
- Devlin Hodges
- Eric Hodges
- Gerald Hodges
- Herman Hodges
- Reggie Hodges
- Isaiah Hodgins
- James Hodgins
- Norm Hodgins
- Pat Hodgson
- Tommy Hodson
- Michael Hoecht
- Bob Hoel
- David Hoelscher
- Dick Hoerner
- Robert Hoernschemeyer
- George Hoey
- Paul Hofer
- Bill Hoffman
- Bob Hoffman
- Brock Hoffman
- Dalton Hoffman
- Gary Hoffman
- Jack Hoffman
- Jake Hoffmanl
- John Hoffman (born 1925)
- John Hoffman (born 1943)
- Dave Hoffmann
- Sterling Hofrichter
- Brandon Hogan
- Chris Hogan
- Darrell Hogan
- Kevin Hogan
- Krishawn Hogan
- Marc Hogan
- Mike Hogan
- Paul Hogan
- Tom Hogan
- Merril Hoge
- Gary Hogeboom
- D. D. Hoggard
- Doug Hogland
- Doug Hogue
- Frank Hogue
- Murrell Hogue
- Mike Hohensee
- Jon Hohman
- Bob Hohn
- Al Hoisington
- Chris Hoke
- Jonathan Hoke
- Steve Hokuf
- George Holani
- Colin Holba
- Cole Holcomb
- Kelly Holcomb
- Tex Holcomb
- Robert Holcombe
- Mike Hold
- Curtis Holden
- Sam Holden
- Steve Holden
- Will Holden
- Alijah Holder
- Lew Holder
- Warrick Holdman
- Babe Hole
- Mickey Hole
- John Holecek
- Carlyle Holiday
- Jimmy Holiday
- Jim Holifield
- John Holifield
- Dallin Holker
- Bob Holladay
- Darius Holland
- Devin Holland
- Jamie Holland
- Jeff Holland
- Jevon Holland
- John Holland
- Johnny Holland
- Jonathan Holland
- Montrae Holland
- Vernon Holland
- John Hollar
- Donald Hollas
- Hugo Hollas
- Eric Holle
- Ed Holler
- Tom Holleran
- Tommy Holleran
- Jesse Holley
- Ken Holley
- Nate Holley
- Corey Holliday
- Marcus Holliday
- Ron Holliday
- Trindon Holliday
- Vonnie Holliday
- Doug Hollie
- Dwight Hollier
- Henry Holligan
- Tony Hollings
- Joe Hollingsworth
- Shawn Hollingsworth
- Lamont Hollinquest
- Alexander Hollins
- Justin Hollins
- Mack Hollins
- David Hollis
- Mike Hollis
- Cody Hollister
- Jacob Hollister
- Ka'dar Hollman
- DeVonte Holloman
- Gus Hollomon
- Brian Holloway
- Cornell Holloway
- Derek Holloway
- Glen Holloway
- Jabari Holloway
- Johnny Holloway
- Randy Holloway
- Stan Holloway
- Steve Holloway
- Tony Holloway
- T. J. Hollowell
- Bob Holly
- Daven Holly
- Tony Holm
- John Holman
- Rashad Holman
- Rodney Holman
- Scott Holman
- Walter Holman
- Willie Holman
- Rob Holmberg
- Walt Holmer
- Alex Holmes
- Andre Holmes
- Bruce Holmes
- Christian Holmes
- Clayton Holmes
- Darick Holmes
- Darnay Holmes
- Darryl Holmes
- Don Holmes
- Earl Holmes
- Ernie Holmes
- Gabe Holmes
- Jack Holmes
- Jalyn Holmes
- Jaret Holmes
- Jerry Holmes
- Johnny Holmes
- Kenny Holmes
- Khaled Holmes
- Lamar Holmes
- Lendy Holmes
- Lester Holmes
- Melvin Holmes
- Mike Holmes
- Pat Holmes
- Priest Holmes
- Robert Holmes
- Ron Holmes
- Rudy Holmes
- Santonio Holmes
- Tyrone Holmes
- Tom Holmoe
- Pete Holohan
- Mike Holovak
- Bernard Holsey
- Joshua Holsey
- Mike Holston
- Glenn Holt
- Harry Holt
- Issiac Holt
- James Holt
- John Holt
- Pierce Holt
- Robert Holt
- Terrence Holt
- Torry Holt
- Johnny Holton
- J.P. Holtz
- Glenn Holtzman
- E. J. Holub
- Elijah Holyfield
- Gordy Holz
- Tom Holzer

== Hom–Hoy ==
- Dennis Homan
- Two-Bits Homan
- Tom Homco
- Travis Homer
- Charlie Honaker
- Todd Hons
- Elijah Hood
- Estus Hood
- Frank Hood
- Roderick Hood
- Winford Hood
- Ziggy Hood
- Amani Hooker
- Fair Hooker
- Hendon Hooker
- Malik Hooker
- Alvin Hooks
- Jim Hooks
- Roland Hooks
- Michael Hoomanawanui
- Austin Hooper
- Trell Hooper
- Mitch Hoopes
- Brad Hoover
- Houston Hoover
- Melvin Hoover
- Charles Hope
- Chris Hope
- Neil Hope
- Andy Hopkins
- Brad Hopkins
- Brycen Hopkins
- DeAndre Hopkins
- Dustin Hopkins
- Jerry Hopkins
- Roy Hopkins
- Tam Hopkins
- Ted Hopkins
- Thomas Hopkins
- Trey Hopkins
- Wes Hopkins
- Harry Hopp
- Darrel Hopper
- Ty'Ron Hopper
- Doug Hoppock
- Tyrone Hopson
- Al Hoptowit
- Mike Horan
- Roy Hord, Jr.
- Alvin Horn
- Bob Horn
- Chris Horn
- Dick Horn
- Don Horn
- Jaycee Horn
- Jimmy Horn Jr.
- Joe Horn
- Marty Horn
- Rod Horn
- Jay Hornbeak
- Dick Horne
- Greg Horne
- Jeremy Horne
- Timmy Horne
- Tony Horne
- Sam Horner
- Bill Hornick
- Steamer Horning
- Ron Hornsby
- Paul Hornung
- Bill Horrell
- Cam Horsley
- Jesper Horsted
- Roy Horstmann
- Bob Horton
- Chris Horton
- Dylan Horton
- Ethan Horton
- Greg Horton
- Jason Horton
- Larry Horton
- Mike Horton
- Ray Horton
- Tory Horton
- Wes Horton
- Zach Horton
- Les Horvath
- Zander Horvath
- Arnold Horween
- Ralph Horween
- Bob Hoskins
- Derrick Hoskins
- Gator Hoskins
- Phil Hoskins
- Jayron Hosley
- Clarence Hosmer
- Clark Hoss
- Jeff Hostetler
- Babe Houck
- Jim Hough
- Jerry Houghton
- Mike Houghton
- Bill Houle
- Davon House
- Kevin House
- Kevin House, Jr.
- John Houser
- Kevin Houser
- T. J. Houshmandzadeh
- Rob Housler
- Walt Housman
- Bill Houston
- Bobby Houston
- Cedric Houston
- Chris Houston
- Dennis Houston
- James Houston
- Jameson Houston
- Jim Houston
- Justin Houston
- Ken Houston
- Lamarr Houston
- Lin Houston
- Rich Houston
- Walt Houston
- DeAndre Houston-Carson
- Chris Hovan
- Don Hover
- Junie Hovious
- Anthony Howard
- Austin Howard
- Billy Howard
- Bob Howard
- Bobbie Howard
- Bobby Howard
- Brian Howard
- Bryan Howard
- Carl Howard
- Chris Howard
- Cordaro Howard
- Dana Howard
- Darren Howard
- David Howard
- Desmond Howard
- Dosey Howard
- Eddie Howard
- Erik Howard
- Gene Howard
- Harry Howard
- Jaye Howard
- Joey Howard
- Jordan Howard
- Leroy Howard
- Marcus Howard
- O. J. Howard
- Paul Howard
- Percy Howard
- Red Howard
- Reggie Howard
- Ron Howard
- Sherman Howard
- Thomas Howard, Sr. (born 1954)
- Thomas Howard (born 1983)
- Todd Howard
- Tracy Howard
- Travin Howard
- Tubby Howard
- Ty Howard
- Tytus Howard
- William Howard
- Willie Howard
- Xavien Howard
- Jordan Howden
- Garry Howe
- Glen Howe
- Bill Howell
- Buddy Howell
- Clarence Howell
- Delano Howell
- Delles Howell
- Dixie Howell
- Earl Howell
- Foster Howell
- Jim Lee Howell
- John Howell (born 1915)
- John Howell (born 1978)
- Lane Howell
- Mike Howell
- Pat Howell
- Sam Howell
- Steve Howell
- Karl Hower
- Bobby Howfield
- Ian Howfield
- Chuck Howley
- Keenan Howry
- Julian Howsare
- Bill Howser
- Billy Howton
- Lynn Hoyem
- Steve Hoyem
- Brian Hoyer
- Braxton Hoyett
- Bobby Hoying
- Oliver Hoyte

== Hr–Hul ==
- Frank Hrabetin
- Gary Hrivnak
- Brock Huard
- Damon Huard
- John Huard
- John Huarte
- Mike Hubach
- Bud Hubbard
- Cal Hubbard
- Chris Hubbard
- Chuba Hubbard
- David A. Hubbard
- Marv Hubbard
- Paul Hubbard
- Sam Hubbard
- Frank Hubbell
- Brad Hubbert
- Joe Huber
- Kevin Huber
- Gene Hubka
- Harlan Huckleby
- Jim Huddleston
- John Huddleston
- Floyd Hudlow
- Mike Hudock
- Bill Hudson
- Bob Hudson (born 1930)
- Bob Hudson (born 1948)
- Bryan Hudson
- Chris Hudson
- Dick Hudson (born 1898)
- Dick Hudson (born 1940)
- Doug Hudson
- Gordon Hudson
- James Hudson
- Jim Hudson
- John Hudson
- Johnnie Hudson
- Khaleke Hudson
- Marcus Hudson
- Mike Hudson
- Nat Hudson
- Rodney Hudson
- Tanner Hudson
- Tommy Hudson
- Jack Hueller
- Carlos Huerta
- Gene Huey
- Talanoa Hufanga
- Alan Huff
- Bryce Huff
- Charles Huff
- Gary Huff
- Josh Huff
- Ken Huff
- Marqueston Huff
- Marty Huff
- Michael Huff
- Orlando Huff
- Sam Huff
- Ken Huffine
- Darvell Huffman
- Dave Huffman
- Dick Huffman
- Frank Huffman
- Iolas Huffman
- Tim Huffman
- Vern Huffman
- Del Hufford
- John Hufnagel
- Harry Hugasian
- Albert Huggins
- Johnny Huggins
- Kareem Huggins
- Roy Huggins
- Bernie Hughes
- Bill Hughes
- Bob Hughes
- Brandon Hughes
- Chuck Hughes
- Danan Hughes
- Dante Hughes
- David Hughes
- Dennis Hughes
- Denny Hughes
- Dick Hughes
- Ed Hughes
- Ernie Hughes
- George Hughes
- Hank Hughes
- Jerry Hughes
- John Hughes
- Juju Hughes
- Kevin Hughes
- Mike Hughes
- Montori Hughes
- Nate Hughes
- Pat Hughes
- Randy Hughes
- Robert Hughes
- Tyrone Hughes
- Van Hughes
- Tommy Hughitt
- Charley Hughlett
- George Hughley
- Joe Hugret
- Bill Hull
- Evan Hull
- Josh Hull
- Kent Hull
- Mike Hull (born 1945)
- Mike Hull (born 1991)
- Tom Hull
- Corey Hulsey
- Vivian Hultman
- Don Hultz
- George Hultz

== Hum–Hy ==
- Ramon Humber
- Dick Humbert
- Weldon Humble
- Mike Humiston
- David Humm
- Jake Hummel
- Swede Hummell
- Mack Hummon
- Bobby Humphery
- Bobby Humphrey
- Buddy Humphrey
- Claude Humphrey
- Creed Humphrey
- Deon Humphrey
- Donnie Humphrey
- Lil'Jordan Humphrey
- Marlon Humphrey
- Paul Humphrey
- Ronald Humphrey
- Tommy Humphrey (born 1950)
- Tommy Humphrey
- Tory Humphrey
- Bob Humphreys
- Adam Humphries
- D. J. Humphries
- Leonard Humphries
- Stan Humphries
- Stefan Humphries
- Brett Hundley
- James Hundon
- Charlie Huneke
- Lamonte Hunley
- Ricky Hunley
- Jim Hunnicutt
- Chuck Hunsinger
- Akeem Hunt
- Ben Hunt
- Bob Hunt
- Bobby Hunt
- Byron Hunt
- Calvin Hunt
- Charlie Hunt
- Cletidus Hunt
- Daryl Hunt
- Ervin Hunt
- Gary Hunt
- George Hunt
- Jack Hunt
- Jackie Hunt
- Jalyx Hunt
- Jim Lee Hunt
- Joey Hunt
- John Hunt
- Kareem Hunt
- Kevin Hunt
- Margus Hunt
- Mike Hunt
- Phillip Hunt
- Robert Hunt
- Ron Hunt
- Sam Hunt
- Tony Hunt
- Al Hunter
- Art Hunter
- Billy Hunter
- Brice Hunter
- Dameon Hunter
- Daniel Hunter
- Danielle Hunter
- Darrell Hunter
- Earnest Hunter
- Eddie Hunter
- Herman Hunter
- Ivy Joe Hunter
- James Hunter (born 1954)
- James Hunter (born 1957)
- Jarquez Hunter
- Jason Hunter
- Javin Hunter
- Jeff Hunter
- John Hunter
- Justin Hunter
- Kendall Hunter
- Merle Hunter
- Michael Hunter
- Monty Hunter
- Patrick Hunter
- Pete Hunter
- Ramey Hunter
- Ryan Hunter
- Scott Hunter
- Stan Hunter
- Tony Hunter (born 1960)
- Tony Hunter (born 1963)
- Torey Hunter
- Travis Hunter
- Wayne Hunter
- Will Hunter
- Adin Huntington
- Greg Huntington
- Caleb Huntley
- Jason Huntley
- Kevin Huntley
- Richard Huntley
- Tyler Huntley
- Thomas Hupke
- Jeff Hurd
- Sam Hurd
- John Hurlburt
- Bill Hurley
- George Hurley
- John Hurley
- Allen Hurns
- Bill Hurst
- Demontre Hurst
- Hayden Hurst
- James Hurst
- Maurice Hurst
- Maurice Hurst Jr.
- Chuck Hurston
- Eric Hurt
- Maurice Hurt
- Jalen Hurts
- Todd Husak
- Ed Husmann
- Al Hust
- Michael Husted
- Ken Hutcherson
- Paul Hutchins
- Von Hutchins
- Aidan Hutchinson
- Bill Hutchinson
- Chad Hutchinson
- Ralph Hutchinson
- Scott Hutchinson
- Steve Hutchinson
- Tom Hutchinson
- Xavier Hutchinson
- Anthony Hutchison
- Chuck Hutchison
- Elvin Hutchison
- Gerry Huth
- Bruce Huther
- Brian Hutson
- Don Hutson
- Merle Hutson
- Tony Hutson
- Jack Hutton
- Tom Hutton
- Trevor Hutton
- Ken Huxhold
- John Huzvar
- Alijah Huzzie
- Fred Hyatt
- Jalin Hyatt
- Steve Hyche
- Carlos Hyde
- Glenn Hyde
- Micah Hyde
- Gaylon Hyder
- Kerry Hyder
- Bob Hyland
- Ishmael Hyman
- Randy Hymes
- Paul Hynes
- Henry Hynoski
- Henry Hynoski, Sr.
- Ruben Hyppolite
