= Tremon Smith =

American football player (born 1996)

No. 11 – Houston Texans
- Positions: Cornerback, kick returner
- Roster status: Active

Personal information
- Born: July 20, 1996 (age 30); Anniston, Alabama, U.S.
- Listed height: 5 ft 11 in (1.80 m)
- Listed weight: 190 lb (86 kg)

Career information
- High school: Saks (Saks, Alabama)
- College: Central Arkansas (2014–2017)
- NFL draft: 2018: 6th round, 196th overall pick

Career history
- Kansas City Chiefs (2018–2019); Green Bay Packers (2019); Philadelphia Eagles (2019–2020)*; Indianapolis Colts (2020); Houston Texans (2021–2022); Denver Broncos (2023–2024); Houston Texans (2025–present)
- * Offseason or practice squad member only

Awards and highlights
- PFWA All-Rookie Team (2018); 3× First-team All-Southland (2015–2017)

Career NFL statistics as of 2025
- Total tackles: 85
- Forced fumbles: 3
- Fumble recoveries: 3
- Pass deflections: 7
- Interceptions: 2
- Return yards: 2,996
- Return touchdowns: 1
- Stats at Pro Football Reference

Tremon Smith (born July 20, 1996) is an American professional football player for the Houston Texans of the National Football League (NFL). He played college football at cornerback for the Central Arkansas Bears, and was selected by the Kansas City Chiefs in the sixth round of the 2018 NFL draft. He is most notable for playing on special teams as a kick returner. Tremon played in for the Green Bay Packers, Indianapolis Colts, and Denver Broncos.

== Early life ==
Smith attended Saks High School in Saks, Alabama, where he played high school football. Smith led the team to the AHSAA Class 4A semi-finals at quarterback, safety, kick returner, and punt returner, in 2013.

== College career ==
Smith played college football at Central Arkansas. In 2017, Smith had 41 tackles and five interceptions, earning him a selection as a third-team Football Championship Subdivision All-American. In his four years at Central Arkansas, Smith had 15 interceptions.

== Professional career ==
Pre-draft measurables
Height	Weight	Arm length	Hand span	Wingspan	40-yard dash	10-yard split	20-yard split	20-yard shuttle	Three-cone drill	Vertical jump	Broad jump	Bench press
5 ft 9 5/8 in (1.77 m)	191 lb (87 kg)	31 in (0.79 m)	8 3/8 in (0.21 m)	6 ft 2 7/8 in (1.90 m)	4.40 s	1.50 s	2.59 s	4.14 s	7.03 s	34.0 in (0.86 m)	9 ft 11 in (3.02 m)	15 reps
All values from Pro Day

=== Kansas City Chiefs ===
Smith was drafted by the Kansas City Chiefs in the sixth round (196th overall) of the 2018 NFL draft. He primarily played on special teams (particularly as a kick returner) during his rookie season, but also saw some playing time on defense as a cornerback. During the 2018 season, he had 33 returns for 886 yards, including a 97-yard return against the Denver Broncos, averaging 26.8 yards per return. He was named to the NFL All-Rookie Team as a returner.

Prior to the 2019 season, the Chiefs moved Smith from cornerback to running back; after the preseason, however, he was moved back to cornerback.

Smith was waived by the Chiefs on September 14, 2019.

=== Green Bay Packers ===
Smith was claimed off waivers by the Green Bay Packers on September 17, 2019. He was waived on October 14 and re-signed to the practice squad two days later. He was promoted to the active roster on October 29. On December 2, 2019, Smith was waived by the Packers.

=== Philadelphia Eagles ===
On December 4, 2019, Smith was signed to the Philadelphia Eagles practice squad. He signed a reserve/future contract with the Eagles on January 6, 2020. He was waived on July 26, 2020.

=== Indianapolis Colts ===
On August 16, 2020, Smith signed with the Indianapolis Colts. He was waived on September 5, 2020, and re-signed to the team's practice squad the next day. He was promoted to the active roster on September 22, 2020.

=== Houston Texans (first stint) ===
Smith signed with the Houston Texans on March 22, 2021. During a stellar season as a core special teamer, Smith signed a one-year contract extension on December 3, 2021. In Week 15, Smith had a 98-yard kick return touchdown and downed a punt inside the five-yard line in a 30–16 win over the Jacksonville Jaguars, earning American Football Conference Special Teams Player of the Week. On December 11, 2022, in a game against the Dallas Cowboys, Smith intercepted the Cowboys' quarterback Dak Prescott twice marking the first and second of his career.

=== Denver Broncos ===
On March 17, 2023, the Denver Broncos signed Smith to a two-year contract.

=== Houston Texans (second stint) ===
On March 14, 2025, Smith signed a two-year, $7.5 million deal to return to the Texans.

== NFL career statistics ==
Legend
	Led the league
**Bold**	Career high

=== Regular season ===
Year	Team	Games		Tackles					Interceptions						Fumbles			Punt returns					Kickoff returns				
Year	Team	GP	GS	Comb	Total	Ast	Sack	TFL	Int	Yards	Avg	Long	TD	PD	FF	Fmb	FR	Ret	Yds	Avg	Lng	TD	Ret	Yds	Avg	Lng	TD
2018	KC	14	1	5	4	1	0.0	0	0	0	0.0	0	0	1	0	**2**	**1**	0	0	0.0	0	0	**33**	**886**	26.8	97	0
2019	KC	1	0	0	0	0	0.0	0	0	0	0.0	0	0	0	0	1	0	0	0	0.0	0	0	0	0	0.0	0	0
2019	GB	7	0	3	2	1	0.0	0	0	0	0.0	0	0	0	0	0	0	**4**	0	0.0	3	0	13	303	23.3	36	0
2020	IND	10	0	2	2	0	0.0	0	0	0	0.0	0	0	0	0	0	0	0	0	0.0	0	0	8	180	22.5	33	0
2021	HOU	**17**	**2**	21	**16**	5	0.0	0	0	0	0.0	0	0	0	0	0	**1**	1	1	1.0	1	0	21	537	25.6	**98**	**1**
2022	HOU	**17**	**2**	22	**16**	6	0.0	**1**	**2**	**33**	**16.5**	**26**	0	**4**	**3**	0	0	**4**	**53**	13.3	**26**	0	19	417	21.9	32	0
2023	DEN	**17**	0	5	5	0	0.0	0	0	0	0.0	0	0	0	0	0	**1**	1	14	**14.0**	14	0	0	0	0.0	0	0
2024	DEN	**17**	0	4	3	1	0.0	0	0	0	0.0	0	0	0	0	0	0	0	0	0.0	0	0	6	170	**28.3**	38	0
2025	HOU	**17**	1	**23**	13	**10**	0.0	**1**	0	0	0.0	0	0	2	0	1	0	0	0	0.0	0	0	18	435	24.2	37	0
Total		117	6	85	61	24	0.0	2	2	33	16.5	26	0	7	3	4	3	10	68	6.8	26	0	118	2,928	24.8	98	1
Source: NFL.com

=== Postseason ===
Year	Team	Games		Tackles					Interceptions						Fumbles			Punt returns					Kickoff returns				
Year	Team	GP	GS	Comb	Total	Ast	Sack	TFL	Int	Yards	Avg	Long	TD	PD	FF	Fmb	FR	Ret	Yds	Avg	Lng	TD	Ret	Yds	Avg	Lng	TD
2018	KC	**2**	0	1	1	0	0.0	0	0	0	0.0	0	0	0	0	0	**1**	0	0	0.0	0	0	**6**	**138**	**23.0**	**29**	0
2020	IND	1	0	0	0	0	0.0	0	0	0	0.0	0	0	0	0	0	0	0	0	0.0	0	0	0	0	0.0	0	0
2024	DEN	1	0	0	0	0	0.0	0	0	0	0.0	0	0	0	0	0	0	0	0	0.0	0	0	1	16	16.0	16	0
2025	HOU	**2**	0	**2**	**2**	0	0.0	0	0	0	0.0	0	0	0	0	0	0	0	0	0.0	0	0	0	0	0.0	0	0
Total		6	0	3	3	0	0.0	0	0	0	0.0	0	0	0	0	0	1	0	0	0.0	0	0	7	154	22.0	29	0
Source: pro-football-reference.com
