= List of Montana State Bobcats in the NFL draft =

This is a list of Montana State Bobcats football players in the NFL draft.

== Key ==
| B | Back | K | Kicker | NT | Nose tackle |
| C | Center | LB | Linebacker | FB | Fullback |
| DB | Defensive back | P | Punter | HB | Halfback |
| DE | Defensive end | QB | Quarterback | WR | Wide receiver |
| DT | Defensive tackle | RB | Running back | G | Guard |
| E | End | T | Offensive tackle | TE | Tight end |

== Selections ==
| Year | Round | Pick | Player | Team | Position |
|---|---|---|---|---|---|
| 1947 | 19 | 175 | John McLellan | Chicago Bears | T |
| 1948 | 16 | 136 | Dan Yovetich | New York Giants | E |
| 1948 | 19 | 170 | Bill Nelson | Los Angeles Rams | B |
| 1952 | 22 | 258 | Bob Byrne | Pittsburgh Steelers | B |
| 1955 | 22 | 254 | Vic Berra | Chicago Cardinals | E |
| 1957 | 13 | 154 | Ed Ritt | Chicago Cardinals | T |
| 1957 | 14 | 164 | Ron Warzeka | San Francisco 49ers | T |
| 1957 | 27 | 322 | Bob Butorovich | Chicago Cardinals | T |
| 1959 | 5 | 56 | John Lands | Los Angeles Rams | E |
| 1961 | 14 | 187 | Bob Schmitz | Pittsburgh Steelers | G |
| 1962 | 12 | 159 | Bob O'Billovich | St. Louis Cardinals | B |
| 1963 | 10 | 127 | Curt Farrier | Los Angeles Rams | T |
| 1966 | 3 | 0 | Jan Stenerud | Kansas City Chiefs | K |
| 1968 | 13 | 331 | K. O. Trepanier | New Orleans Saints | DE |
| 1970 | 17 | 427 | Frank Kalfoss | Denver Broncos | K |
| 1971 | 9 | 223 | Gary Gustafson | Cincinnati Bengals | LB |
| 1972 | 12 | 310 | Bob Banaugh | Minnesota Vikings | DB |
| 1974 | 1 | 23 | Bill Kollar | Cincinnati Bengals | DT |
| 1974 | 9 | 232 | Sam McCullum | Minnesota Vikings | WR |
| 1975 | 5 | 112 | Wayne Hammond | Los Angeles Rams | DT |
| 1976 | 11 | 316 | Steve Kracher | Minnesota Vikings | RB |
| 1976 | 12 | 329 | Pat Bolton | Atlanta Falcons | K |
| 1976 | 16 | 457 | Randy Hickel | Minnesota Vikings | DB |
| 1978 | 12 | 334 | Lee Washburn | Dallas Cowboys | G |
| 1979 | 3 | 62 | Jon Borchardt | Buffalo Bills | T |
| 1980 | 7 | 191 | Stuart Dodds | San Diego Chargers | P |
| 1985 | 7 | 196 | Mark Fellows | San Diego Chargers | LB |
| 1987 | 11 | 300 | Kirk Timmer | New York Jets | LB |
| 1992 | 7 | 180 | Corey Widmer | New York Giants | LB |
| 1994 | 7 | 214 | Sean Hill | Miami Dolphins | DB |
| 2002 | 4 | 134 | Johnathan Taylor | Detroit Lions | LB |
| 2004 | 3 | 70 | Joey Thomas | Green Bay Packers | DB |
| 2011 | 7 | 239 | Mike Person | San Francisco 49ers | G |
| 2016 | 7 | 252 | Beau Sandland | Carolina Panthers | TE |
| 2022 | 2 | 58 | Troy Andersen | Atlanta Falcons | LB |
| 2022 | 7 | 235 | Daniel Hardy | Los Angeles Rams | LB |
| 2025 | 6 | 213 | Tommy Mellott | Las Vegas Raiders | WR |
