= Alexandria, Alabama =

Unincorporated community in Alabama, United States

- Unincorporated community Census-designated place
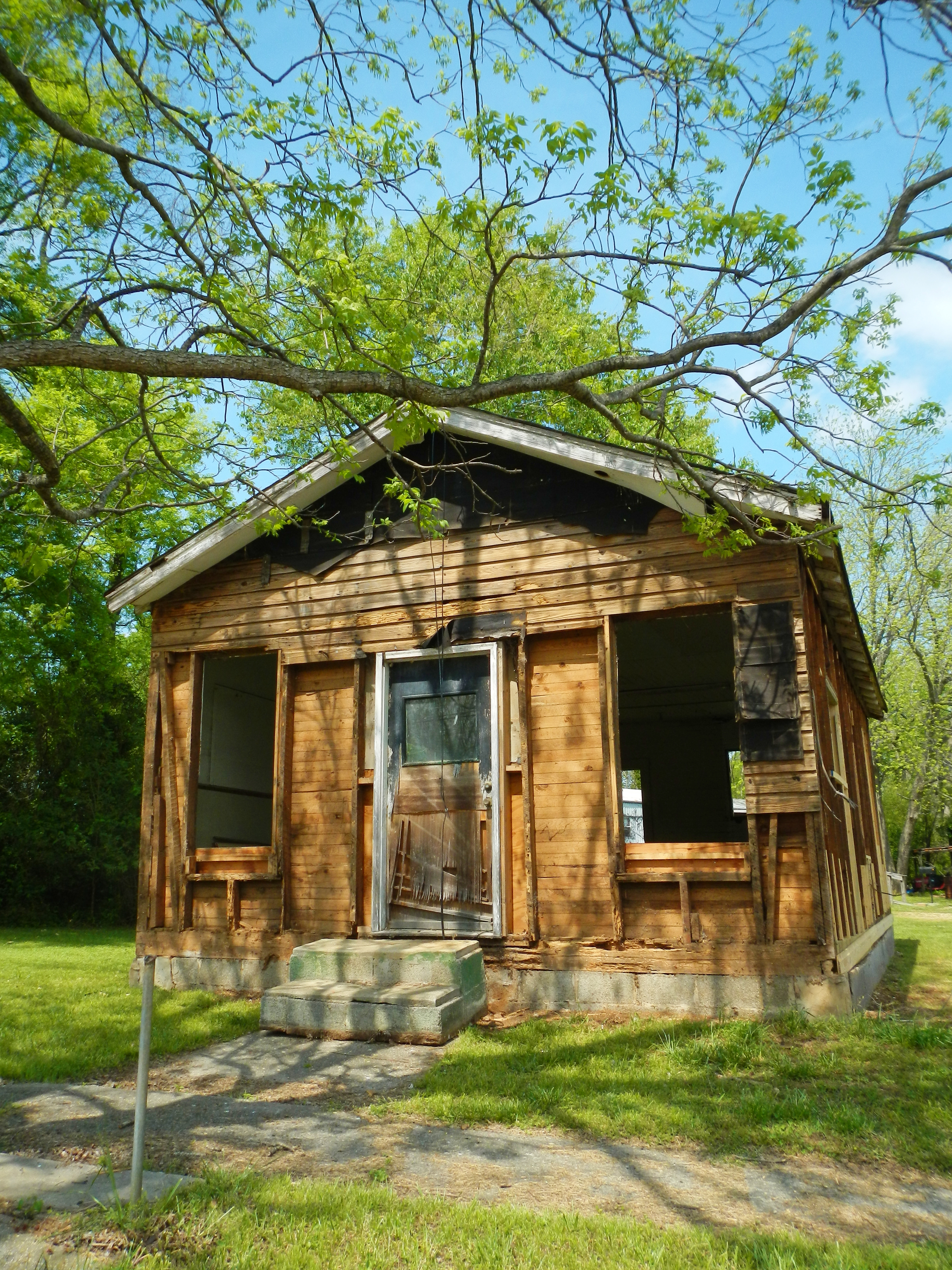
- The old post office in Alexandria was restored by the Alexandria Historical Preservation Society in 2016.

- Location in Calhoun County and the state of Alabama
- Coordinates: 33°45′47″N 85°52′40″W
- Country: United States
- State: Alabama
- County: Calhoun

Area
  - Total: 11.15 sq mi (28.87 km^{2})
  - Land: 11.14 sq mi (28.84 km^{2})
  - Water: 0.012 sq mi (0.03 km^{2})
- Elevation: 597 ft (182 m)

Population (2020)
  - Total: 4,032
  - Density: 362/sq mi (139.8/km^{2})
- Time zone: UTC-6 (Central (CST))
  - Summer (DST): UTC-5 (CDT)
- ZIP code: 36250
- Area code: 256
- FIPS code: 01-01180
- GNIS feature ID: 2402638

Alexandria is a census-designated place and unincorporated community in Calhoun County, Alabama, United States. At the 2020 census, the population was 4,032. It is included in the Anniston–Oxford, Alabama Metropolitan Statistical Area.

== Geography ==
Alexandria is located near the center of Calhoun County. It is bordered to the south by the Saks CDP.

According to the U.S. Census Bureau, the Alexandria CDP has a total area of 11.1 square miles (28.8 km^{2}), of which 0.012 square miles (0.03 km^{2}), or 0.11%, is water.

== Demographics ==
Historical population
Census	Pop.	Note	%±
1880	121		—
2000	3,692		—
2010	3,917		6.1%
2020	4,032		2.9%
U.S. Decennial Census; 1850 1860 1870; 1880 1890-1900; 1910 1920 1930; 1940 1950 1960; 1970 1980 1990; 2000 2010

Alexandria first appeared as an incorporated town on the 1880 U.S. Census, though no date of incorporation was mentioned and it did not appear again as a town after that census. It would not appear separately on the census again until it was made a census-designated place (CDP) in 2000. The precinct was also named Alexandria and first appeared on the 1870 U.S. Census. (See Alexandria Division below)

=== Racial and ethnic composition ===
Alexandria CDP, Alabama – Racial and ethnic composition Note: the US Census treats Hispanic/Latino as an ethnic category. This table excludes Latinos from the racial categories and assigns them to a separate category. Hispanics/Latinos may be of any race.
Race / Ethnicity (NH = Non-Hispanic)	Pop 2000	Pop 2010	Pop 2020	% 2000	% 2010	% 2020
White alone (NH)	3,253	3,411	3,390	88.11%	87.08%	84.08%
Black or African American alone (NH)	360	400	408	9.75%	10.21%	10.12%
Native American or Alaska Native alone (NH)	10	8	12	0.27%	0.20%	0.30%
Asian alone (NH)	22	18	22	0.60%	0.46%	0.55%
Native Hawaiian or Pacific Islander alone (NH)	4	10	12	0.11%	0.26%	0.30%
Other race alone (NH)	2	5	2	0.05%	0.13%	0.05%
Mixed race or Multiracial (NH)	17	30	132	0.46%	0.77%	3.27%
Hispanic or Latino (any race)	24	35	54	0.65%	0.89%	1.34%
Total	3,692	3,917	4,032	100.00%	100.00%	100.00%

=== 2020 census ===
As of the 2020 census, Alexandria had a population of 4,032. The median age was 41.8 years. 23.4% of residents were under the age of 18 and 17.7% of residents were 65 years of age or older. For every 100 females there were 96.7 males, and for every 100 females age 18 and over there were 91.6 males age 18 and over.

5.8% of residents lived in urban areas, while 94.2% lived in rural areas.

There were 1,567 households in Alexandria, of which 32.6% had children under the age of 18 living in them. Of all households, 54.6% were married-couple households, 16.1% were households with a male householder and no spouse or partner present, and 23.2% were households with a female householder and no spouse or partner present. About 25.1% of all households were made up of individuals and 11.0% had someone living alone who was 65 years of age or older.

There were 1,655 housing units, of which 5.3% were vacant. The homeowner vacancy rate was 1.0% and the rental vacancy rate was 6.8%.

=== 2010 census ===
As of the census of 2010, there were 3,917 people, 1,505 households, and 1,150 families residing in Alexandria. The population density was 352 inhabitants per square mile (136/km^{2}). There were 1,599 housing units at an average density of 143.6 per square mile (55.4/km^{2}). The racial makeup of the community was 87.4% White, 10.2% Black or African American, 0.3% Native American, 0.5% Asian, 0.3% Pacific Islander, 0.5% from other races, and 0.8% from two or more races. 0.9% of the population were Hispanic or Latino of any race.

There were 1,505 households, out of which 31.5% had children under the age of 18 living with them, 59.3% were married couples living together, 13.2% had a female householder with no husband present, and 23.6% were non-families. 20.1% of all households were made up of individuals, and 7.3% had someone living alone who was 65 years of age or older. The average household size was 2.60 and the average family size was 2.99.

The population was spread out, with 25.1% under the age of 18, 7.5% from 18 to 24, 26.3% from 25 to 44, 28.6% from 45 to 64, and 12.6% who were 65 years of age or older. The median age was 39.2 years. For every 100 females, there were 94.1 males. For every 100 females age 18 and over, there were 94.6 males.

The median income for a household in Alexandria was $41,324, and the median income for a family was $66,061. Males had a median income of $47,788 versus $30,294 for females. The per capita income for the community was $21,647. About 19.8% of families and 19.4% of the population were below the poverty line, including 29.7% of those under age 18 and 16.2% of those age 65 or over.

== Alexandria Precinct (1870-1950); Websters Chapel/Alexandria Valley Division (1960-2000); Alexandria-Websters Chapel Division (2010-) ==
Historical population
Census	Pop.	Note	%±
1870	1,689		—
1880	2,036		20.5%
1890	2,498		22.7%
1900	2,019		−19.2%
1910	2,219		9.9%
1920	1,631		−26.5%
1930	1,434		−12.1%
1940	1,248		−13.0%
1950	1,647		32.0%
1960	4,646		182.1%
1970	5,024		8.1%
1980	7,310		45.5%
1990	9,135		25.0%
2000	11,030		20.7%
2010	11,730		6.3%
U.S. Decennial Census

The beat (precinct) containing Alexandria first appeared on the 1870 U.S. Census as Alexandria-2nd Beat of Calhoun County. It continued to report as the 2nd precinct until 1950. In 1960, the precincts were merged and/or reorganized into census divisions (as part of a general reorganization of counties) and it was renamed the Websters Chapel/Alexandria Valley Census Division. In 2010, it was renamed Alexandria-Websters Chapel.

== Education ==
There are three public schools located in the community:

- Alexandria High School
- Alexandria Elementary School
- Alexandria Middle School

All three schools are part of the Calhoun County School System.

== Transportation ==
Intercity bus service is provided by Greyhound Lines.

== Other information ==
Though not incorporated, Alexandria is a rapidly growing community. There are a number of restaurants and stores on US 431 within this area, including a grocery store at the intersection with State Route 144 (formerly State Route 62).

== Local history ==
The Battle of Tallushatchee was fought in 1813, when Andrew Jackson sent General John Coffee with 900 dragoons (cavalry) to attack the Red Stick Creek Indians, 3.2 miles (5.1 km) north of Alexandria. Legendary frontiersman Davy Crockett participated in the ensuing battle, where 180 warriors were killed.

== Notable people ==
- T. J. Heath, NFL cornerback
- John Pelham, artillery officer who served with the Confederate cavalry

== Photo Gallery ==
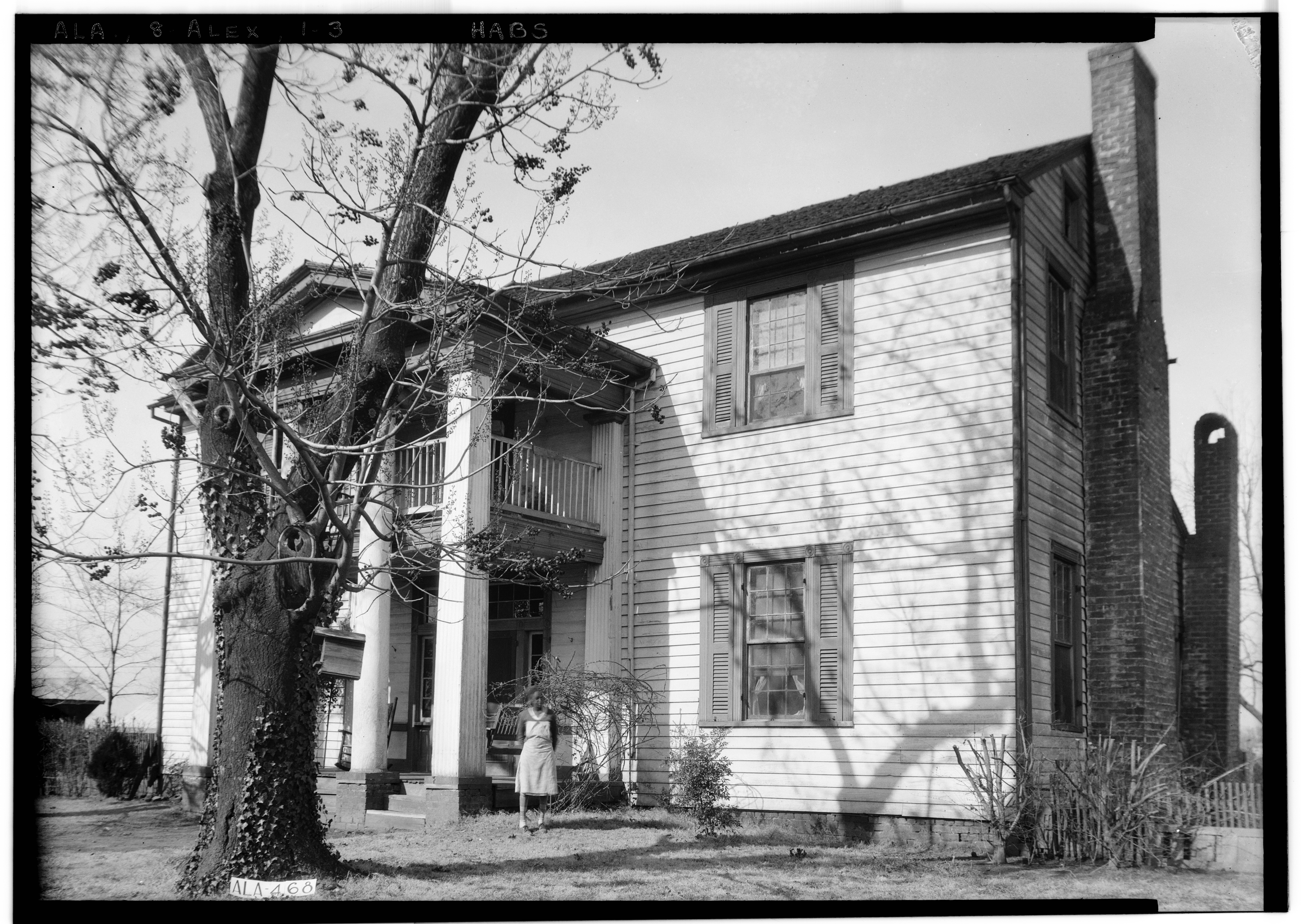
Green-Wood House, Alexandria

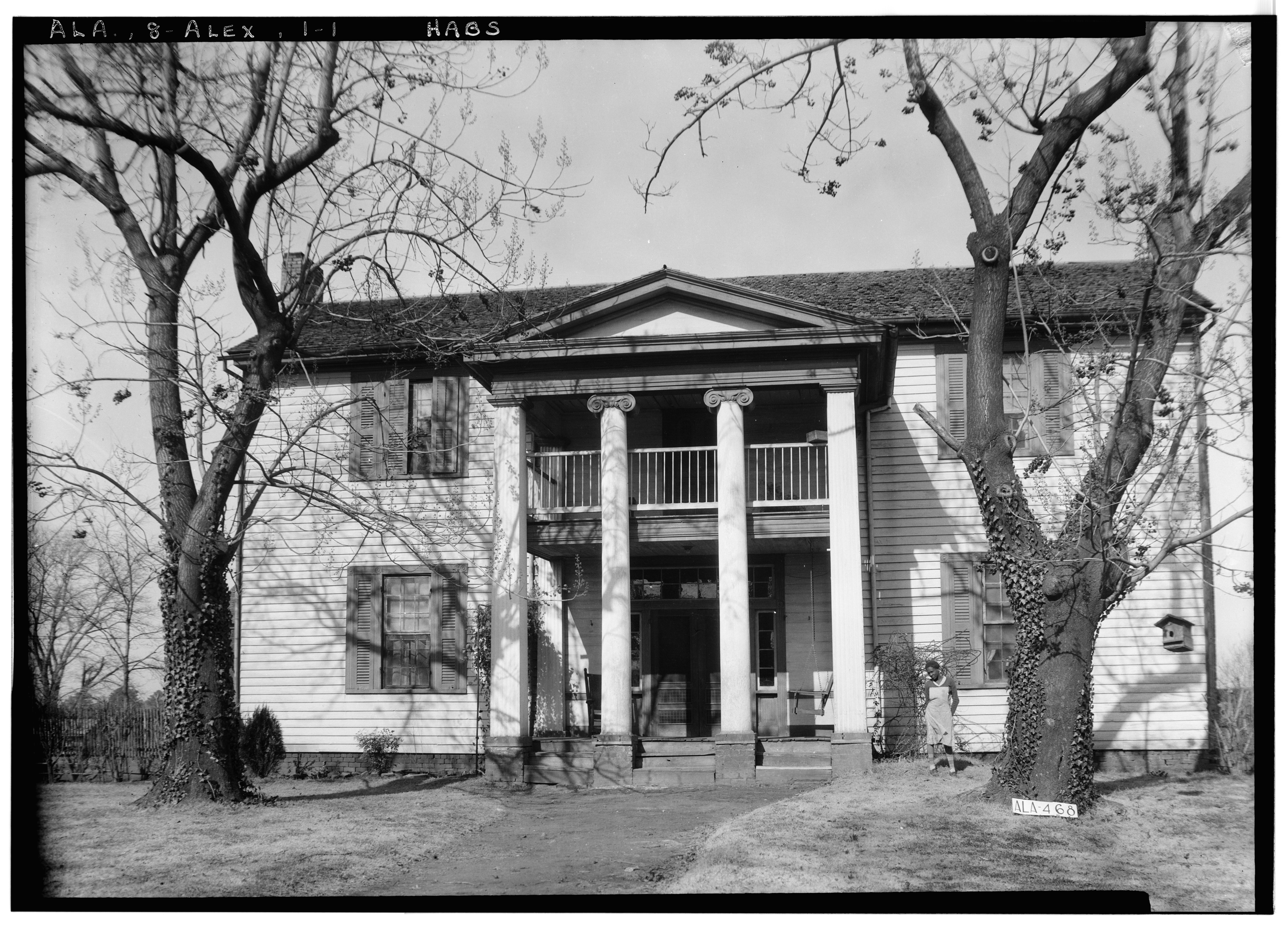
Green-Wood House, Alexandria

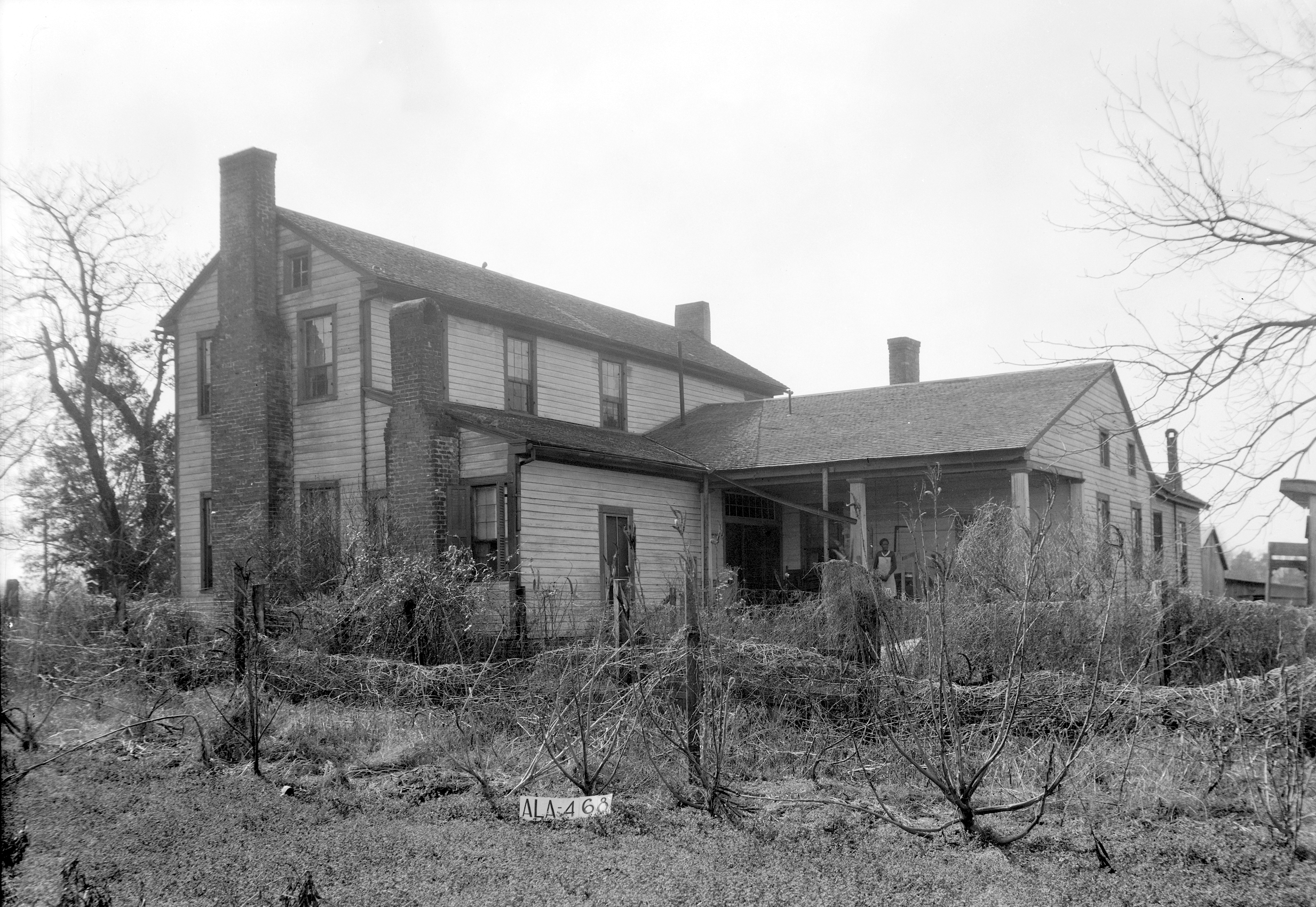
Green-Wood House, Alexandria
