= Pleasant Valley High School (Alabama) =

Location
- 4141 Pleasant Valley; Jacksonville, Alabama 36265; United States; 33°53′05″N 85°49′00″W

Information
- Type: Public
- Motto: Dedicated to Excellence
- Established: 1982 (44 years ago)
- School district: Calhoun County Schools
- CEEB code: 011534
- Principal: Crystal Sparks
- Staff: 24.00 (on an FTE basis)
- Grades: 7 to 12
- Enrollment: 388 (2023–2024)
- Student to teacher ratio: 16.17
- Colors: Columbia blue and red
- Athletics conference: AHSAA Division 2A
- Sports: Basketball, baseball, football, volleyball, golf, softball, band (marching + auxiliary), cheerleading
- Mascot: Raider
- Website: pvhs.calhouncountyschools.com

Pleasant Valley High School is a public high school located in Jacksonville, Alabama. It is part of Calhoun County Schools, along with six other high schools. As of 2023–2024, Pleasant Valley High School had 338 students enrolled in grades 7–12.

== Extracurricular activities ==
The Raiders compete in the Alabama High School Athletic Association in Class 3A. Multiple varsity and JV sports are offered, as well as a band program, robotics, and clubs such as the FFA Association and FBLA.
