= Bill Hudson (American football) =

American gridiron football player (1935–2017)

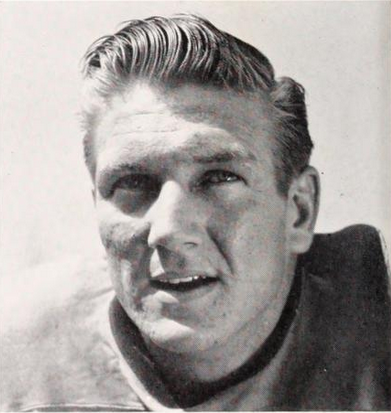
- Hudson at Clemson in 1956

No. 60, 79, 61
- Position: Defensive tackle

Personal information
- Born: July 9, 1935; Hartsville, South Carolina, U.S.
- Died: December 13, 2017 (aged 82); Spartanburg, South Carolina, U.S.
- Listed height: 6 ft 4 in (1.93 m)
- Listed weight: 270 lb (122 kg)

Career information
- High school: North Charleston (SC)
- College: Clemson
- NFL draft: 1957: 3rd round, 34th overall pick

Career history
- Montreal Alouettes (1957–1960); San Diego Chargers (1961-1962); Boston Patriots (1963)

Awards and highlights
- AFL All-Star (1961)

Career AFL statistics
- Sacks: 7
- Interceptions: 1
- Touchdowns: 1
- Stats at Pro Football Reference

William Alex Hudson (July 9, 1935 – December 13, 2017) was an American professional football defensive tackle and unheralded member of the original Fearsome Foursome of defensive linemen in pro football. He attended Clemson University, where he was a member of the track and football teams. He played in the Canadian Football League (CFL) with the Montreal Alouettes and in the American Football League (AFL) with the San Diego Chargers and Boston Patriots. He is a member of the South Carolina Sports Hall of Fame.

Hudson was the younger brother of Bob Hudson, who also attended Clemson and spent 10 seasons (1951–55, 1957–61) in the NFL and AFL as a linebacker and defensive back.

== 'Fearsome' legacy ==
Hudson was selected in the third round by the cash-strapped Chicago Cardinals in the 1957 NFL draft. He signed for more money with the Alouettes of the Canadian Football League instead. He played with the Alouettes for three seasons and often both ways as an offensive and defensive tackle. Chargers assistant coach Al Davis learned that Hudson was unhappy with his situation and convinced him to jump to the new American League Football League.

Hudson was the captain of the Chargers defense in the 1961 and 1962 seasons, when he teamed with tackle Ernie Ladd and ends Earl Faison and Ron Nery on the most physically dominant line in the AFL if not all of pro football. The group soon became known as the Fearsome Foursome—they were even celebrated in “The Fearsome Foursome Stomp" musical recording—although their Los Angeles Rams counterparts in the more established NFL would gain more notoriety with the same monicker only years later.

“About 10 years ago, (ex-Chargers assistant coach) Chuck Noll made the comment in Sports Illustrated when asked if his Pittsburgh Steelers line (the legendary Steel Curtain) was the best he'd ever had. And he said, no, the Chargers line was the best.” Hudson told the Spartanburg (S.C.) Herald-Journal in a 2009 interview. “We were the largest defensive line in the history of football at that time. And back in those days, we lied about our weight down, where now players lie up about their weight.”

While the 6-foot-4, 270-pound Hudson was a run-stopper first and foremost, he possessed the savvy and physical strength to be an effective pass-rusher as well. In 1961, his AFL debut, he had four sacks and one interception that was returned for a touchdown. In large part because of the Fearsome Foursome and their unmerciful treatment of quarterbacks, the Chargers intercepted a league record 49 passes en route to the division title. Hudson and Faison were selected to the West Division All-Star team that season.

Hudson was traded to the Patriots after the 1962 campaign. He saw action in four games with them before retirement as a player. He went on to spend 17 years as an area scout for Al Davis after the Chargers assistant coach left the team to become the Oakland Raiders head man.

Hudson died on December 13, 2017, at a medical center in Spartanburg, South Carolina, at the age of 82. He was survived by his wife of 59 years, Lillian, three children, six grandchildren and two brothers.
