= Bo Roberson =

American track and field athlete and football player

No. 26, 40, 46
- Position: Wide receiver

Personal information
- Born: July 23, 1935; Philadelphia, Pennsylvania, U.S.
- Died: April 15, 2001 (aged 65); Pasadena, California, U.S.
- Listed height: 6 ft 1 in (1.85 m)
- Listed weight: 195 lb (88 kg)

Career information
- High school: John Bartram (PA); Wyoming Seminary
- College: Cornell
- AFL draft: 1961: undrafted

Career history
- San Diego Chargers (1961); Oakland Raiders (1962–1965); Buffalo Bills (1965); Miami Dolphins (1966)

Awards and highlights
- AFL champion (1965); AFL All-Star (1965)
- Stats at Pro Football Reference

Bo Roberson
Medal record

Men's Athletics

Representing the United States

Olympic Games
Silver medal – second place	1960 Rome	Long jump

Pan American Games
Gold medal – first place	1959 Chicago	Long jump

Irvin "Bo" Roberson (Pronounced: ROE-ber-sun) (July 23, 1935 – April 15, 2001) was an American track and field athlete and professional football player. At Cornell University he excelled in basketball, football, and track and field. At the 1960 Summer Olympics in Rome, Italy he won the silver medal in the long jump, a centimeter short of the Olympic record 8.12 m gold medal jump by Ralph Boston.

After the Olympics, Roberson had a seven-year football career as a wide receiver in the American Football League (AFL) with the San Diego Chargers, Oakland Raiders, Buffalo Bills, and Miami Dolphins. He caught three passes for eighty-eight yards in the Bills' 23–0 defeat of the Chargers in the 1965 American Football League Championship Game. Roberson led the league in all purpose yards in 1964, and was named to the AFL All-Star Game in 1965.

After his NFL career was over, Roberson became the first track and field coach at University of California, Irvine and later coached track at Rolling Hills High School.

Roberson is the only person to have an Ivy League degree, a Ph.D., an Olympic medal and a career in the NFL.

At the time of his death, he was retired from a position as psychologist with the Los Angeles Unified School District.
