= Calhoun County Schools (Alabama) =

School district in Alabama, United States

- Anniston, Alabama; United States

Information
- Type: School district
- Website: https://www.calhouncountyschools.com/

Calhoun County School District is a school district headquartered in Anniston, Alabama, United States.

It serves most areas in Calhoun County, although the cities of Anniston, Jacksonville, Oxford, and Piedmont are served by separate school districts.

== Schools ==
Secondary middle-high:

- Ohatchee High School
- Pleasant Valley High School
- Walter Wellborn High School
- Weaver High School

High:

- Alexandria High School
- Saks High School
- White Plains High School

Middle:

- Alexandria Middle School
- Saks Middle School
  - Its attendance area, between Anniston and Jacksonville, consists of suburban areas.
- White Plains Middle School

Elementary:

- Alexandria Elementary School
- Ohatchee Elementary School
  - Its attendance area is in a rural area.
- Pleasant Valley Elementary School
- Saks Elementary School
  - Its attendance area, between Anniston and Jacksonville, consists of suburban areas.
- Walter Wellborn Elementary School
- Weaver Elementary School
- White Plains Elementary School

Other:

- Career Academy
