= Alexandria High School (Alabama) =

Public high school in Alexandria, Alabama

Location
- 353 Stadium Drive; Alexandria, Alabama 36250; United States; 33°46′32″N 85°53′03″W

Information
- Type: Public high school
- School district: Calhoun County Schools
- Superintendent: Tony Willis
- CEEB code: 010055
- Principal: Derek Cobb
- Teaching staff: 29.30 (on an FTE basis)
- Grades: 9-12
- Enrollment: 486 (2023–2024)
- Student to teacher ratio: 16.59
- Colors: Orange and black
- Nickname: Valley Cubs
- Website: ahs.calhouncountyschools.com

Alexandria High School is a public high school in Alexandria, Alabama, United States. It is part of Calhoun County Schools, serving grades 9-12. Alexandria High School is one of several schools in the Calhoun County Schools System. The school includes grades 9 through 12. The principal is Derek Cobb, and the assistant principal is Toni Brown.

The school's mascot is the Valley Cub "Cubby", and the school colors are orange and black.

== Academics ==
The school operates on a 5-block schedule day and offers both career-prep and college-prep courses, including AP and honors courses.

Electives include Spanish, Environmental Science, Anatomy, Pre-calculus, Agri-Science, and World History.

The campus hosts a special education program.

Students in grades 7 through 12 from Alexandria have completed and won in math tournaments, including the annual Calhoun County (AL) Schools Math Tournament.

Students at Alexandria may participate in the Calhoun County School System Robotics Team. The team was the first annual Calhoun County Schools tournament champion in 2025.

== Student activities and clubs ==
Student activities include Senior High Scholars Bowl, Student Government Association, Future Farmers of America, FCCLA, Senior Honor Society, Key Club, Project Outreach, FBLA, Men & Women of the Valley, Fellowship of Christian Athletes, State-level choir, a marching band, and a concert band, the "Sound of the Valley".

The Miss Alexandria Pageant is an annual affair at the school, as well as the junior/denior prom.

Alexandria students produce an annual yearbook called The Alexandrian.

== Facilities ==
- The on-campus football stadium, Lou Scales Stadium, contains Larry Ginn Field.
- The auditorium/gymnasium is the Brenard Howard Gymnasium.
- The new gymnasium is called Larry Ginn Gymnasium
- Evelyn Broome Library
- The softball field is near the football stadium.
- The baseball field is near Larry Ginn Gymnasium.
- The band room is located in the new addition of the school.
- The agricultural workshop is located in the northern wing of the school.

== Athletic programs ==
The school offers the following athletic programs: varsity football, basketball, volleyball, golf, baseball, softball, wrestling, track & field, swimming, and cross-county. Alexandria also has cheerleading and a marching band.

The Alabama High School Athletic Association assigned Alexandria to Class 3A (out of four classifications) until 1985, then Class 4A (out of 6 classifications) until 2013, and then Class 5A (out of seven classifications) starting in 2014. The Valley Cubs returned to Class 4A in 2024.

=== State championships ===
- 1985: football
- 1992: boys' basketball
- 1993: boys' basketball
- 1993: girls' volleyball
- 1994: girls' volleyball
- 1995: girls' volleyball
- 1995: football
- 1997: football
- 1997: boys' basketball
- 2004: girls' fast-pitch softball
- 2008: girls' golf
- 2014: girls' fast-pitch softball
- 2017: girls' volleyball
- 2024: girls' golf
- 2024: boys' baseball

== Alma mater ==
"A.H.S.", our Alma Mater, we'll be true to thee.
From the Juniors to the Seniors, filled with Loyalty.
Through the years that pass away, we'll always stand by Thee.
Alma Mater, Alma Mater, we'll remember Thee.

"A.H.S.", our Alma Mater, through the years that come
We will pledge Thee our Devotion, each and everyone.
We will march beneath Thy Banner, triumphantly!
Alma Mater, Alma Mater, we'll be true to Thee.

== Notable alumni ==
- T. J. Heath - NFL cornerback
