= Saks High School =

Public high school in Anniston, Alabama

Location
- 4401 Saks Rd; Anniston, Alabama 36206; United States; 33.7023°N 85.8369°W

Information
- Type: Public high school
- School district: Calhoun County Schools
- CEEB code: 010123
- Principal: Seth Taylor
- Teaching staff: 27.90 (on an FTE basis)
- Grades: 7-12
- Enrollment: 419 (2024–2025)
- Student to teacher ratio: 15.02
- Colors: Red & white
- Nickname: Wildcats
- Website: shs.calhouncountyschools.com

Saks High School is a public school in Anniston, Alabama, and is part of the Calhoun County School District. The school serves grades 7–12. The school's teams are known as the Wildcats. Red and white are the school colors. The school is at 4401 Saks Road.

== History ==
Saks Middle School was closed following declining enrollment, and the high school expanded. Seth Taylor is the school's principal. The football team has been around for decades. It has yet to win a state championship.

The public library of Anniston-Calhoun County has a collection of the school's yearbooks.

Taylor Swift performed at the school's gymnasium in 2007.

== Alumni ==
- Michael Cooper, adventurer
- John Craton, composer
- Mike Rogers, member of the U.S. House of Representatives
- Tremon Smith, football player

== See also ==
- List of high schools in Alabama
