= Bob Laraba =

American football player (1933–1962)

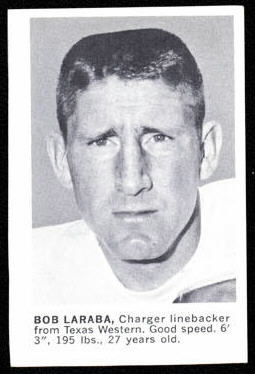

No. 17, 53
- Positions: Linebacker, quarterback

Personal information
- Born: May 30, 1933; Sheldon, Vermont, U.S.
- Died: February 16, 1962 (aged 28); San Diego, California, U.S.
- Listed height: 6 ft 3 in (1.91 m)
- Listed weight: 195 lb (88 kg)

Career information
- High school: Niagara Falls (Niagara Falls, New York)
- College: UTEP
- NFL draft: 1959: 8th round, 95th overall pick

Career history
- Green Bay Packers (1959)*; Los Angeles/San Diego Chargers (1960-1961)
- * Offseason or practice squad member only

Awards and highlights
- Los Angeles Chargers Hall of Fame

Career AFL statistics
- Interceptions: 6
- Touchdowns: 3
- Sacks: 2.5
- Stats at Pro Football Reference

Robert Edward Laraba (May 30, 1933 – February 16, 1962) was an American professional football player who was a linebacker and quarterback in the American Football League (AFL). He played professionally for the Los Angeles/San Diego Chargers (1960–1961) after playing college football with the UTEP Miners. He was killed in an automobile accident at the conclusion of his second season with the Chargers.

== See also ==
- List of gridiron football players who died during their careers
