= Wes Hamilton =

American football player (born 1953)

No. 61
- Position: Offensive guard

Personal information
- Born: April 24, 1953 (age 73); Texas City, Texas, U.S.
- Listed height: 6 ft 3 in (1.91 m)
- Listed weight: 261 lb (118 kg)

Career information
- High school: Homewood-Flossmoor (Flossmoor, Illinois)
- College: Tulsa
- NFL draft: 1976: 3rd round, 85th overall pick

Career history
- Minnesota Vikings (1976–1985)

Career NFL statistics
- Games played: 116
- Games started: 92
- Fumble recoveries: 1
- Stats at Pro Football Reference

Wes Hamilton (born April 24, 1953) is an American former professional football player who was an offensive lineman for the Minnesota Vikings if the National Football League (NFL). He was selected by the Vikings in the third round of the 1976 NFL draft. He played college football for the Tulsa Golden Hurricane.

One of Hamilton's sons, Ben, was an offensive lineman who played for the Denver Broncos and Seattle Seahawks. His life after football includes his successful career as a small business owner of an Allegra Marketing, Print & Mail franchise in the Minneapolis suburbs. He resides nearby with his college sweetheart, Linda. He is active in his church and is involved with charitable work.
