= Tom Hayes (cornerback) =

American football player (born 1946)

- Hayes in 1972

No. 27, 22
- Position: Cornerback

Personal information
- Born: April 18, 1946 (age 80); Riverside, California, U.S.
- Listed height: 6 ft 1 in (1.85 m)
- Listed weight: 199 lb (90 kg)

Career information
- High school: Rubidoux (CA)
- College: San Diego State
- NFL draft: 1971: 6th round, 137th overall pick

Career history
- Atlanta Falcons (1971–1975); San Diego Chargers (1976)

Career NFL statistics
- Games played: 78
- Starts: 77
- Interceptions: 19
- Fumble recoveries: 6
- Total TDs: 6
- Stats at Pro Football Reference

Thomas J. Hayes Jr. (born April 18, 1946) is an American former professional football player who was a cornerback in the National Football League (NFL). He played for the Atlanta Falcons from 1971 to 1975 and for the San Diego Chargers in 1976. He played college football for the San Diego State Aztecs.

== Early life ==
Tom Hayes Jr. was born April 18, 1946, in Riverside, California. He attended high school in Riverside where he was a star sprinter on the school track and field team, turning in a 9.7 time on the 100 yard dash, as well as a forward on the basketball team.

== College career ==
After graduation he attended Riverside City College, where he continued his athletic career, earning All-Eastern California honors on the hardwood. With the United States embroiled in the Vietnam War, a two-year stint in the United States Army followed.

After his discharge from the Army, a younger brother playing football at San Diego State University recommended him to the staff and Hayes was signed to an athletic scholarship to play football, despite the fact that he had not played the game since his high school days. He played the speed defensive position of cornerback at San Diego State, opposite future NFL All-Pro Willie Buchanon. Hayes garnered All-Pacific Coast Athletic Association honors during his senior 1970 season.

== Professional career ==
Hayes was selected by the Atlanta Falcons in the 6th round of the 1971 NFL draft, the 137th player selected. He quickly got his chance to prove his mettle when starter Rudy Redmond went down with a hamstring injury ahead of the first game of the 1971 season. He started his career with a bang, picking off San Francisco 49ers quarterback John Brodie for the first time of the year, adding a second interception and a fumble recovery later in the game. Hayes wound up starting all 14 games of his rookie year for Atlanta, intercepting 3 passes and recovering 3 fumbles, including a scoop-and-score for his first career touchdown.

== Personal life ==
Hayes' brother, Billie Hayes, also played in the NFL.
