= Ben Hamilton =

American football player (born 1977)

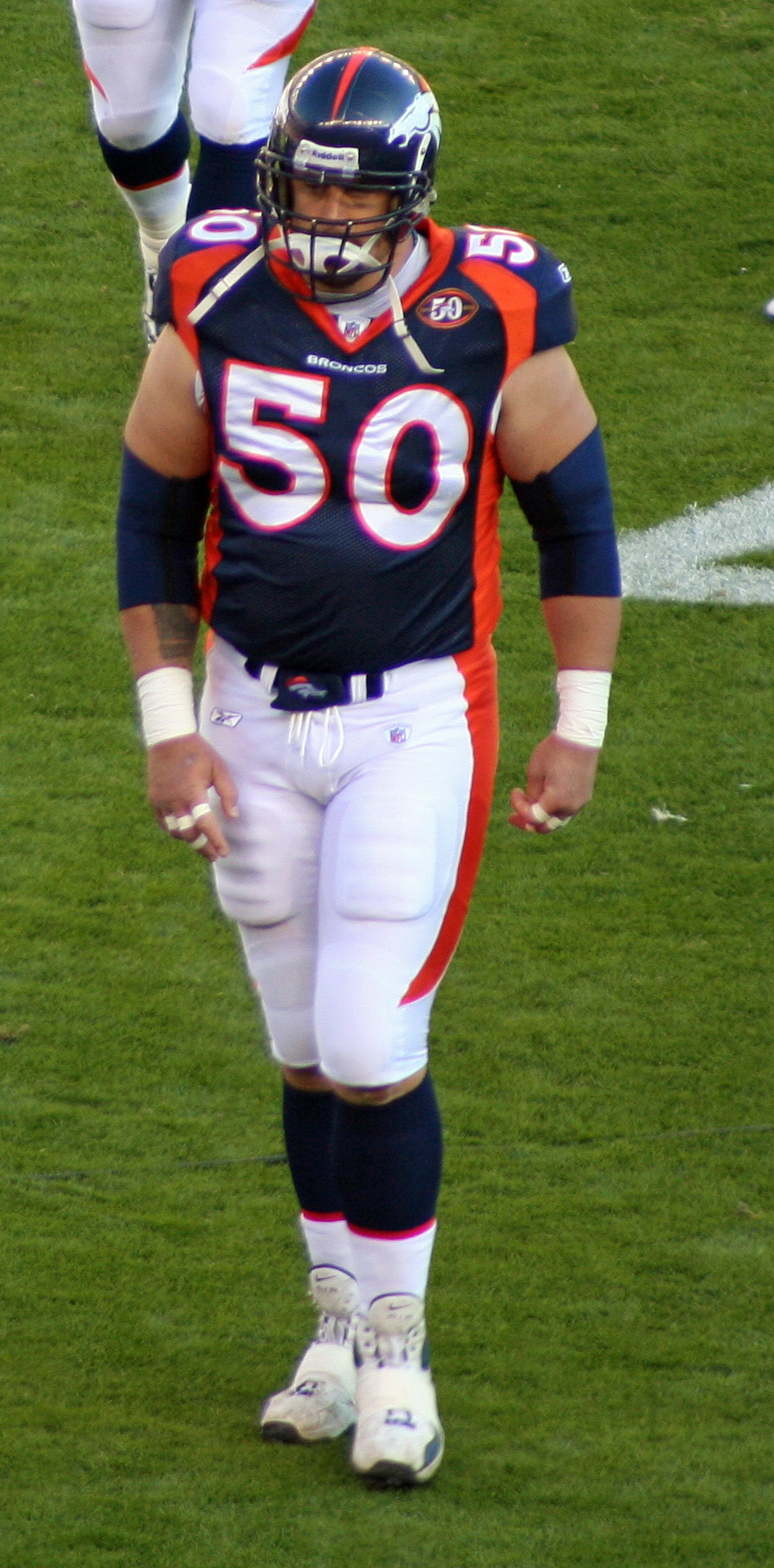
- Hamilton with the Denver Broncos in 2009

No. 50
- Position: Guard / Center

Personal information
- Born: August 18, 1977 (age 49); Minneapolis, Minnesota, U.S.
- Listed height: 6 ft 4 in (1.93 m)
- Listed weight: 290 lb (132 kg)

Career information
- High school: Plymouth (MN) Wayzata
- College: Minnesota
- NFL draft: 2001: 4th round, 113th overall pick

Career history
- Denver Broncos (2001–2009); Seattle Seahawks (2010)

Awards and highlights
- 2× Consensus All-American (1999, 2000); 2× First-team All-Big Ten (1999, 2000)

Career NFL statistics
- Games played: 118
- Games started: 110
- Fumble recoveries: 2
- Stats at Pro Football Reference

Benjamin Thomas Hamilton (born August 18, 1977) is an American former professional football player who was a guard and center for 10 seasons in the National Football League (NFL). He played college football for the University of Minnesota, and was a two-time consensus All-American. The Denver Broncos picked him in the fourth round of the 2001 NFL draft, and he played professionally for the Broncos and Seattle Seahawks of the NFL.

== Early life ==
Hamilton was born in Minneapolis, Minnesota, the son of former Minnesota Vikings offensive lineman Wes Hamilton. He attended Wayzata High School in Plymouth, Minnesota, and was all-state selection in football. He graduated in 1996.

== College career ==
He attended the University of Minnesota, where he played for the Minnesota Golden Gophers football team from 1996 to 2000. He was a two-time first-team All-Big Ten selection, and was recognized as a consensus first-team All-American in 1999 and 2000.

== Professional career ==
He was selected by the Denver Broncos in the fourth round of the 2001 NFL draft. After playing his entire career with the Broncos, Hamilton signed with the Seattle Seahawks on April 20, 2010.

On November 2, 2010, Hamilton was placed on injured reserve. On December 22, Hamilton was waived from the injury list.

== Post NFL career ==
Hamilton is currently a full-time mathematics teacher at Valor Christian High School in Highlands Ranch, CO.
