= Dick Harris (cornerback) =

American football player (born 1937)

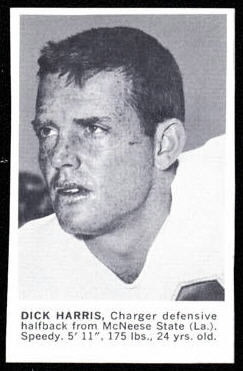
- Harris c. 1961

No. 36
- Position: Cornerback

Personal information
- Born: July 24, 1937 (age 89); Denver, Colorado, U.S.
- Listed height: 5 ft 11 in (1.80 m)
- Listed weight: 187 lb (85 kg)

Career information
- High school: San Pedro (San Pedro, California)
- College: McNeese State (1956–1959)
- AFL draft: 1960: undrafted

Career history
- Los Angeles / San Diego Chargers (1960–1965)

Awards and highlights
- AFL champion (1963); 2× First-team All-AFL (1960, 1961); 2× Second-team All-AFL (1963, 1964); AFL All-Star (1960)

Career statistics
- Interceptions: 29
- Interception yards: 413
- Defensive touchdowns: 5
- Stats at Pro Football Reference

Dick Harris (born July 24, 1937) is an American former professional football player who was a cornerback for six seasons in the American Football League (AFL) with the Los Angeles / San Diego Chargers from 1960 to 1965. He played college football for the McNeese Cowboys. He was selected to the 1960 and 1961 AFL All-League teams. Harris had a total of 25 interceptions in the Chargers' first four seasons.

== See also ==
- List of American Football League players
