= T. J. Heath =

American football player (born 1987)

No. 13, 23, 36
- Position: Cornerback

Personal information
- Born: September 11, 1987 (age 39); Alexandria, Alabama, U.S.
- Listed height: 6 ft 0 in (1.83 m)
- Listed weight: 190 lb (86 kg)

Career information
- High school: Alexandria
- College: Jacksonville State
- NFL draft: 2011: undrafted

Career history
- Jacksonville Jaguars (2011); Cincinnati Bengals (2012)*; Buffalo Bills (2012); Cleveland Browns (2013–2014)*; Miami Dolphins (2014); Carolina Panthers (2015)*; Atlanta Falcons (2015)*; New York Giants (2015)*; Toronto Argonauts (2016); Winnipeg Blue Bombers (2016–2017); Toronto Argonauts (2018); Montreal Alouettes (2018)
- * Offseason or practice squad member only

Awards and highlights
- 2× CFL All-Star (2016, 2017); 2× CFL West All-Star (2016, 2017)
- Stats at Pro Football Reference
- Stats at CFL.ca

Lee Anthony Heath Jr. (born September 11, 1987) is an American former professional football player who was a cornerback in the National Football League and Canadian Football League (CFL). He played college football for the Jacksonville State Gamecocks. He was signed by the NFL's Jacksonville Jaguars as an undrafted free agent in 2011.

Heath was also a member of the Cincinnati Bengals, Buffalo Bills, Cleveland Browns, Miami Dolphins, Carolina Panthers, Atlanta Falcons, and New York Giants of the NFL, and the Toronto Argonauts, Winnipeg Blue Bombers, and Montreal Alouettes of the Canadian Football League (CFL).

== College career ==
Heath played three years at Jacksonville State University for the Gamecocks in Division I FCS. Over three years of on field play from 2007-2009, Heath played in 34 games, amassing 112 tackles, forced 3 fumbles, recovered 2 fumbles, and blocked 2 kicks. Heath also defended 29 passes, intercepting 8 of them; he managed to return two interceptions for touchdowns. During his junior season, Heath was a second team All-America selection.

== Professional career ==
=== Jacksonville Jaguars ===
Heath was signed by the Jacksonville Jaguars following the 2011 NFL draft, he was released by the Jaguars on July 31, 2012.

=== Cincinnati Bengals ===
He was signed by the Bengals on August 4, 2012, then released on August 31, 2012.

=== Buffalo Bills ===
Heath signed with the Buffalo Bills practice squad on September 3, 2012.

Buffalo released him on August 31, 2013, prior to the start of the regular season.

=== Cleveland Browns ===
Heath signed with the Cleveland Browns practice squad on December 4, 2013. The Browns released Heath on August 25, 2014.

=== Miami Dolphins ===
In November 2014, he was signed by the Miami Dolphins to their practice squad and promoted to the active roster on December 13, 2014.

=== Carolina Panthers ===
Heath was signed on August 5, 2015 following the retirement of Chris Houston. On September 5, 2015, he was released by the Panthers.

=== Atlanta Falcons ===
Heath was signed on November 16, 2015 to the practice squad of the Falcons. On December 8, 2015, he was released from the practice squad.

=== New York Giants ===
On December 30, 2015, the New York Giants signed Heath to their practice squad.

=== Toronto Argonauts (first stint) ===
Heath entered the Canadian Football League with the Toronto Argonauts for the 2016 season. He got off to a fast start, with 3 interceptions in his first 5 games. He played 10 games with the Argos, and was named player of the week following a two interception performance before being traded to the Winnipeg Blue Bombers.

=== Winnipeg Blue Bombers ===
Heath's trade to the Bombers involved two high draft picks and Heath, in exchange for quarterback Drew Willy. While Willy's stint with the Argos lasted only a few games, missing out on the playoffs, and being released after the following preseason, Heath picked up where he left off by recording an interception in back to back regular season games against the BC Lions and helping Winnipeg reach the postseason; the Bombers lost a revenge game to the Lions in the Western semi-final. Despite playing a majority of his season in the Eastern Division, Heath's outstanding first year in the CFL culminated in his being named a West Division All-Star, having recorded a total of 51 defensive tackles, 5 special teams tackles, and 7 interceptions, leading the league along with Bombers teammate Maurice Leggett. Heath was further honored by being named to the League All-Star team.

During the 2017 season, Heath continued his strong play for Winnipeg, playing in all 18 games and recording 64 defensive tackles and a sack. Heath had 5 more interceptions on the year, with 4 coming in the first 3 games of the season. Heath did not intercept another pass until week 17, but returned it for a touchdown. Following Winnipeg's playoff defeat, Heath was again named both a Divisional and League-wide All-Star.

=== Toronto Argonauts (second stint) ===
After being named the #8 available free agent for 2018, Heath returned to Toronto on a one-year contract. However, much like his first sting with Toronto, Heath was traded to another team following a hot start to the year, with 24 tackles and 2 interceptions in Toronto's first 6 games.

=== Montreal Alouettes ===
Toronto traded Heath to the Montreal Alouettes in exchange for National lineman Ryan Bomben in early August, following a slew on injuries to Montreal's secondary, which forced Heath to make his Alouettes debut on only 3 days of practise. Heath did not learn about the move until he saw the news on Twitter. Playing in 12 games with Montreal meant that Heath's combined stats for the year were 18 games played, recording a career high 70 tackles and 3 interceptions. His one interception with Montreal came late in the year against the Argonauts.

Heath did not sign with another team or an alternate league (such as the AAF or the XFL) following the 2018 season, and finished his CFL career with 185 defensive tackles, 5 special teams stops, one sack, one defensive touchdown, and 15 interceptions. Despite only three years of play in the CFL, he was named as eligible for the All-Decade Team.
