= Billie Hayes (American football) =

American football player (born 1947)

No. 29, 15
- Position: Cornerback

Personal information
- Born: June 22, 1947 (age 79); Riverside, California, U.S.
- Listed height: 6 ft 1 in (1.85 m)
- Listed weight: 175 lb (79 kg)

Career information
- High school: Rubidoux (Jurupa Valley, California)
- College: San Diego State
- NFL draft: 1970: 4th round, 104th overall pick

Career history
- Cincinnati Bengals (1970–1971)*; Los Angeles Rams (1971)*; New Orleans Saints (1972); Florida Blazers (1974); San Antonio Wings (1975); Detroit Lions (1976)*
- * Offseason or practice squad member only
- Stats at Pro Football Reference

William "Billie" Hayes (born June 22, 1947) is an American former professional football cornerback who played for the New Orleans Saints of the National Football League (NFL). He played college football for the San Diego State Aztecs and was selected by the Cincinnati Bengals in the fourth round of the 1970 NFL draft.

== Early life ==
William Hayes was born on June 22, 1947, in Riverside, California. He attended Rubidoux High School in Jurupa Valley, California.

== College career ==
Hayes played junior college football at Riverside City College from 1966 to 1967. He transferred to San Diego State University, where he was a two-year letterman for the San Diego State Aztecs from 1968 to 1969.

== Professional career ==
Hayes was selected by the Cincinnati Bengals in the fourth round, with the 104th overall pick, of the 1970 NFL draft. During 1970 training camp, the veterans players were gone due to the 1970 NFL players strike. The rookies had the entirety of practice during camp, with Hayes stating he was confident he could make the team due to having a head start over the veterans. However, on August 4, shortly after the veterans returned from the strike, Hayes said he was quitting football. He returned to the team in time for minicamp in May 1970. Hayes was waived on July 16, 1971.

Hayes was claimed off waivers by the Los Angeles Rams on July 23, 1971. He was waived on August 23, 1971, after the Rams acquired Gene Howard from the New Orleans Saints.

Hayes signed with the Saints in 1972. He played in all 14 games, starting four, at cornerback for the Saints during the 1972 season. He was released on August 13, 1973, after giving up a 34-yard touchdown during a preseason game against the Miami Dolphins.

Hayes signed with the Florida Blazers of the upstart World Football League (WFL) on April 5, 1974. He played in all 20 games for the Blazers during the 1974 WFL season and made six interceptions for 105 yards. The Blazers finished the year with a 14–6 and lost to the Birmingham Americans in the World Bowl by a score of 22–21.

The Blazers folded after the 1974 season, and Hayes joined the WFL's San Antonio Wings. He appeared in all 13 games for the Wings in 1975, recording six interceptions for 115 yards. The WFL folded in October 1975.

Hayes was signed by the Detroit Lions in 1976. He was released on July 27 after the first game of the 1976 preseason.

== Personal life ==
Hayes' brother, Tom Hayes, also played in the NFL.
