= Saks, Alabama =

- Census-designated place (CDP) & Unincorporated Community
- Location in Calhoun County and the state of Alabama
- Coordinates: 33°42′43″N 85°51′39″W
- Country: United States
- State: Alabama
- County: Calhoun

Area
  - Total: 12.22 sq mi (31.66 km^{2})
  - Land: 12.18 sq mi (31.54 km^{2})
  - Water: 0.046 sq mi (0.12 km^{2})
- Elevation: 778 ft (237 m)

Population (2020)
  - Total: 9,956
  - Density: 817.6/sq mi (315.68/km^{2})
- Time zone: UTC-6 (Central (CST))
  - Summer (DST): UTC-5 (CDT)
- FIPS code: 01-67608
- GNIS feature ID: 2402815

Saks is a census-designated place (CDP) and Unincorporated community in Calhoun County, Alabama, United States. At the 2020 census, the population was 9,956. The community of Saks is served by the City of Anniston police and fire coverage. It is included in the Anniston-Oxford Metropolitan Statistical Area.

== Geography ==
Saks is located southwest of the center of Calhoun County. It is bordered by the city of Anniston to the southeast, by Alexandria to the north, and by West End-Cobb Town to the south.

According to the U.S. Census Bureau, the community of Saks has a total area of 12.2 square miles (31.6 km^{2}), of which 12.2 square miles (31.5 km^{2}) is land and 0.039 square miles (0.1 km^{2}), or 0.33%, is water.

== Demographics ==
Historical population
Census	Pop.	Note	%±
1970	6,609		—
1980	11,118		68.2%
1990	11,138		0.2%
2000	10,698		−4.0%
2010	10,744		0.4%
2020	9,956		−7.3%

Saks first appeared on the 1970 U.S. Census as the unincorporated place of "Anniston Northwest." The name was changed to Saks effective with the 1980 census and it was made a census-designated place (CDP).

=== Racial and ethnic composition ===
Saks CDP, Alabama – Racial and ethnic composition Note: the US Census treats Hispanic/Latino as an ethnic category. This table excludes Latinos from the racial categories and assigns them to a separate category. Hispanics/Latinos may be of any race.
Race / Ethnicity (NH = Non-Hispanic)	Pop 2000	Pop 2010	Pop 2020	% 2000	% 2010	% 2020
White alone (NH)	8,938	7,996	6,523	83.55%	74.42%	65.52%
Black or African American alone (NH)	1,361	2,050	2,354	12.72%	19.08%	23.64%
Native American or Alaska Native alone (NH)	41	44	41	0.38%	0.41%	0.41%
Asian alone (NH)	75	80	81	0.70%	0.74%	0.81%
Native Hawaiian or Pacific Islander alone (NH)	8	3	9	0.07%	0.03%	0.09%
Other race alone (NH)	9	14	33	0.08%	0.13%	0.33%
Mixed race or Multiracial (NH)	89	187	484	0.83%	1.74%	4.86%
Hispanic or Latino (any race)	177	370	431	1.65%	3.44%	4.33%
Total	10,698	10,744	9,956	100.00%	100.00%	100.00%

=== 2020 census ===
As of the 2020 census, Saks had a population of 9,956 people in 4,039 households, including 2,785 families. The median age was 41.8 years. 21.1% of residents were under the age of 18 and 18.6% were 65 years of age or older. For every 100 females, there were 93.8 males, and for every 100 females age 18 and over, there were 90.4 males age 18 and over.

92.0% of residents lived in urban areas, while 8.0% lived in rural areas.

Of all households, 27.4% had children under the age of 18 living in them. 44.3% were married-couple households, 18.6% were households with a male householder and no spouse or partner present, and 30.6% were households with a female householder and no spouse or partner present. About 28.0% of all households were made up of individuals, and 11.9% had someone living alone who was 65 years of age or older.

There were 4,564 housing units, of which 11.5% were vacant. The homeowner vacancy rate was 3.2%, and the rental vacancy rate was 12.9%.

=== 2010 census ===
As of the census of 2010, there were 10,744 people, 4,269 households, and 3,005 families residing in the community. The population density was 884 inhabitants per square mile (341/km^{2}). There were 4,648 housing units at an average density of 380.9 per square mile (147.1/km^{2}). The racial makeup of the community was 75.7% White, 19.4% Black or African American, 0.4% Native American, 0.8% Asian, 0.0% Pacific Islander, 1.7% from other races, and 2.0% from two or more races. 3.4% of the population were Hispanic or Latino of any race.

There were 4,286 households, out of which 26.8% had children under the age of 18 living with them, 49.4% were married couples living together, 16.0% had a female householder with no husband present, and 29.6% were non-families. 25.3% of all households were made up of individuals, and 9.9% had someone living alone who was 65 years of age or older. The average household size was 2.51 and the average family size was 2.99.

In the community, the population was spread out, with 23.4% under the age of 18, 7.8% from 18 to 24, 25.5% from 25 to 44, 27.4% from 45 to 64, and 15.9% who were 65 years of age or older. The median age was 39.8 years. For every 100 females, there were 90.8 males. For every 100 females age 18 and over, there were 92.2 males.

The median income for a household in the community was $43,955, and the median income for a family was $53,129. Males had a median income of $45,637 versus $30,774 for females. The per capita income for the CDP was $20,968. About 12.2% of families and 15.7% of the population were below the poverty line, including 19.5% of those under age 18 and 9.1% of those age 65 or over.

== Education ==
There is an elementary school, a middle school, and a high school located within the community. These schools are administered by the Calhoun County School System. Saks High School's athletic teams (known as the Wildcats) currently compete in Class 3A of the Alabama High School Athletic Association.
