= Luther Hayes =

American football player (1939–2017)

No. 24
- Position: End

Personal information
- Born: March 7, 1939; San Diego, California, U.S.
- Died: November 23, 2017 (aged 78); Palos Verdes, California, U.S.
- Listed height: 6 ft 4 in (1.93 m)
- Listed weight: 202 lb (92 kg)

Career information
- High school: Lincoln (San Diego)
- College: USC
- NFL draft: 1961: 10th round, 140th overall pick
- AFL draft: 1961: 27th round, 215th overall pick

Career history

Playing
- San Diego Chargers (1961); Denver Broncos (1962)*
- * Offseason or practice squad member only

Coaching
- Los Angeles City (1974) Assistant coach; Los Angeles City (1975–1977) Head coach

Career AFL statistics
- Receptions: 14
- Receiving yards: 280
- Touchdowns: 3
- Stats at Pro Football Reference

Luther Hayes (March 7, 1939 – November 23, 2017) was an American football player and coach. He played professionally as an end for the San Diego Chargers of the American Football League (AFL) in 1961. Hayes served as the head football coach at Los Angeles City College (LACC) from 1975 to 1977.

Competing for the USC Trojans track and field program, Hayes also won the 1960 and 1961 NCAA Division I Men's Outdoor Track and Field Championships in the triple jump.

Hayes was hired at LACC in 1972 as a physical education instructor. He was an assistant football coach under Al Baldock in 1974 before succeeding him as head football coach the following year.

Hayes died on November 23, 2017, in Palos Verdes, California, at age 78.

== Head coaching record ==
Year	Team	Overall	Conference	Standing	Bowl/playoffs
Los Angeles City Cubs (Southern California Conference) (1975–1977)
1975	Los Angeles City	2–7	1–5	6th	
1976	Los Angeles City	2–8	1–5	6th	
1977	Los Angeles City		2–4	T–5th	
Los Angeles City:			4–14		
Total:					
