= Cliff Hansen (American football) =

American football player (1910–2001)

Profile
- Position: Halfback

Personal information
- Born: June 29, 1910; Thief River Falls, Minnesota
- Died: November 11, 2001 (aged 91); Pope County, Minnesota
- Listed height: 6 ft 1 in (1.85 m)
- Listed weight: 190 lb (86 kg)

Career information
- High school: Minnewaska (MN)
- College: Luther

Career history
- Chicago Cardinals (1933)

Career statistics
- Rushing yards: 55
- Passing yards: 8
- Games: 5

Clifford Harold Hansen (June 29, 1910 – November 11, 2001) was an American football player.

Hansen was born in 1910 at Thief River Falls, Minnesota. He attended Minnewaska High School in Glenwood, Minnesota. He enrolled at Luther College in Decorah, Iowa, and played college football for the Luther Norsemen from 1929 to 1932.

Hansen also played professional football in the National Football League (NFL) as a halfback for the Chicago Cardinals. He began the season with the Chicago Bears, but he was optioned to the Cardinals on October 7. He appeared in five NFL games during the 1933 season, tallying 55 rushing yards and eight passing yards. He was injured in a game with the Green Bay Packers, resulting in his hospitalization for 10 days.
