= Henry Schmidt (American football) =

American football player (1935–2021)

- Schmidt in 1961

No. 74, 76
- Positions: Defensive tackle, end

Personal information
- Born: September 28, 1935; South Gate, California, U.S.
- Died: May 17, 2021 (aged 85); La Mesa, California, U.S.
- Listed height: 6 ft 4 in (1.93 m)
- Listed weight: 254 lb (115 kg)

Career information
- High school: Los Angeles (CA) John C. Fremont
- College: USC (1954-1955); Trinity (TX) (1958)
- NFL draft: 1958: 6th round, 71st overall pick

Career history
- San Francisco 49ers (1959–1960); San Diego Chargers (1961–1964); Buffalo Bills (1965); New York Jets (1966)

Awards and highlights
- 2× AFL champion (1963, 1965); AFL All-Star (1965)

Career NFL statistics
- Interceptions: 1
- Fumble recoveries: 1
- Total touchdowns: 1
- Sacks: 6
- Stats at Pro Football Reference

Henry Joseph "Hank" Schmidt (September 28, 1935 – May 17, 2021) was an American professional football player who was a defensive tackle in the American Football League (AFL).

== Professional career ==
Schmidt with the San Francisco 49ers in 1961.

Schmidt played collegiately at the University of Southern California and professionally between 1959 and 1966, starting with the National Football League's San Francisco 49ers and moving to the new American Football League's San Diego Chargers in 1961. He played on the Buffalo Bills 1965 AFL Champions in 1965, earning a place in that year's AFL All-Star Team. He finished his professional football career in 1966 with the AFL's New York Jets.

He died on May 17, 2021, in La Mesa, California, at age 85.

== See also ==
- Other American Football League Players
