= Ron Nery =

American football player (1934–2002)

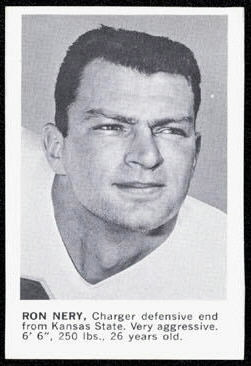
- Nery c. 1961

No. 57, 80, 83, 89
- Position: Defensive end

Personal information
- Born: December 30, 1934; New Kensington, Pennsylvania, U.S.
- Died: April 2, 2002 (aged 67); Topeka, Kansas, U.S.
- Listed height: 6 ft 6 in (1.98 m)
- Listed weight: 247 lb (112 kg)

Career information
- High school: New Kensington
- College: Kansas State (1952–1955)
- NFL draft: 1956: 7th round, 81st overall pick

Career history

Playing
- BC Lions (1958); Los Angeles / San Diego Chargers (1960–1962); Denver Broncos (1963); Houston Oilers (1963); Norfolk Neptunes (1965); Hartford Charter Oaks (1965-1966); Norfolk Neptunes (1966-1970)

Coaching
- Norfolk Neptunes (1969-1970) Assistant coach

Awards and highlights
- First-team All-AFL (1961); AFL sacks co-leader (1961); First-team All-Big Seven (1954); Second-team All-Big Seven (1955)

Career AFL statistics
- Sacks: 17.5
- Stats at Pro Football Reference

Ronald Duane Nery (December 30, 1934 – April 2, 2002) was an American football defensive end who played in the American Football League (AFL). He played four seasons for the Los Angeles / San Diego Chargers (1960–1962), the Denver Broncos (1963), and the Houston Oilers (1963).

He played for the Kansas State Wildcats from 1953 through 1955. During his junior and senior years, he was selected to the All-Big 7 first team. In 1956, he was a seventh-round draft pick for the New York Giants.

He became a resident of Grapevine, Texas. In 2002, he died of an enlarged heart while visiting friends in Topeka, Kansas.
