= Wayne Hammond (American football) =

American football player (born 1953)

No. 72
- Position: Defensive tackle

Personal information
- Born: January 30, 1953 (age 73); Minneapolis, Minnesota, U.S.
- Listed height: 6 ft 5 in (1.96 m)
- Listed weight: 257 lb (117 kg)

Career information
- High school: Anoka
- College: Montana State
- NFL draft: 1975: 5th round, 112th overall pick

Career history
- Los Angeles Rams (1975)*; Tampa Bay Buccaneers (1976)*; Denver Broncos (1976)
- * Offseason or practice squad member only
- Stats at Pro Football Reference

Wayne Roger Hammond (born January 30, 1953) is an American former professional football player who was a defensive tackle for the Denver Broncos of National Football League (NFL). He played college football for the Montana State University.
