= 1988 San Diego Chargers season =

NFL team season

- Owner: Alex Spanos
- General manager: Steve Ortmayer
- Head coach: Al Saunders
- Home stadium: Jack Murphy Stadium

Results
- Record: 6–10
- Division place: 4th AFC West
- Playoffs: Did not qualify
- All-Pros: None
- Pro Bowlers: 1: DE Lee Williams

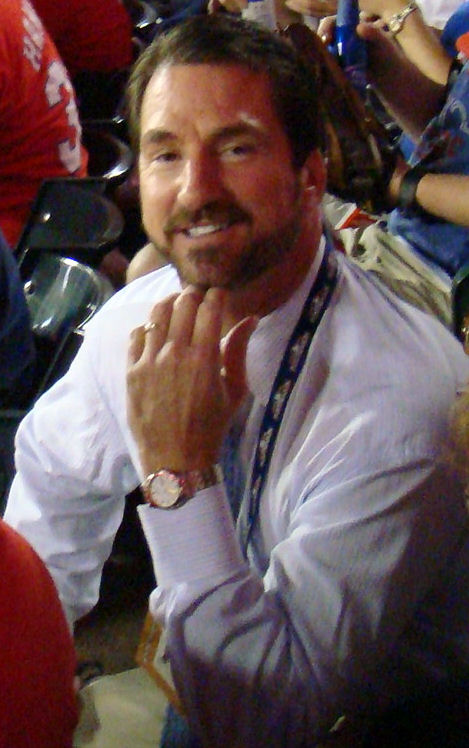
Babe Laufenberg was one of three quarterbacks tried as a replacement for the retired Dan Fouts.

The 1988 San Diego Chargers season was the franchise's 19th season in the National Football League, its 29th overall and the second and final full season under head coach Al Saunders.

This was the first season after the retirement of Dan Fouts, who had been the Chargers' starting quarterback for the majority of games over the past 15 seasons. The new-look passing attack struggled in his absence, ranking 26th out of 28 teams. San Diego team failed to improve on their 8–7 record in 1987 and finished 6–10: following a 2–2 start, they lost six straight games to drop out of the playoff race.

Saunders was fired the day after the season finale, amid rumors of friction between the head coach and Director of Football Operations Steve Ortmayer.

== Offseason ==
=== Departures ===
The San Diego offense saw three major departures: Dan Fouts had retired shortly after the 1987 season, Wes Chandler was traded to San Francisco in the off-season, while Kellen Winslow had a dispute with management over his fitness to play, and officially retired early in the 1988 season. Each of the trio are in the Chargers Hall of Fame; Fouts and Winslow are both in the Pro Football Hall of Fame. Fouts had his number retired on November 27, at halftime of a game against the San Francisco 49ers.

Other departures also affected the passing game: Fouts' backup of the past three seasons, Mark Herrmann, also departed, traded to the Colts, while tight end Pete Holohan moved on to the Los Angeles Rams after seven seasons in San Diego. Pro Bowl left tackle Jim Lachey expressed discontentment in San Diego, and was traded to the Raiders for second-year lineman John Clay and a pair of draft picks. On defense, cornerback Danny Walters was released after being charged with DUI and the possession of cocaine, and linebacker Thomas Benson was traded to New England.

=== Arrivals ===
San Diego looked to the free agent market for their replacement at quarterback, acquiring eight-year veteran Mark Malone from Pittsburgh on April 12, in exchange for an eight-round draft pick. They later added journeyman Babe Laufenberg, who had previously been with four different teams (including San Diego in 1985) without throwing a pass. Another offensive acquisition was blocking tight end Arthur Cox, who would start every game in 1988.

On defense, linebacker Keith Browner and defensive back Roy Bennett were both added via free agency; Bennett had led the CFL in interceptions the previous year. Also in the defensive backfield, Leonard Coleman was acquired from the Colts in exchange for a 12th round draft pick, and two weeks into the season, Sam Seale was brought in from the LA Raiders after to replace an injured Pat Miller. Later in the season, kicker Vince Abbott was injured, and free agent Steve DeLine replaced him for the final five games.

=== NFL draft ===
San Diego made 10 selections in the 1988 draft. They addressed their need at wide receiver by choosing Anthony Miller and Quinn Early with their first two selections. Both were seen as speedsters - Miller was timed at 4.33 seconds in the 40-yard dash, with Early at 4.36. Al Saunders had considered trading up to ensure the team could draft Miller, but the Chargers were able to secure their target with the 15th overall selection. Both receivers signed contracts in July.

In total, San Diego signed six of their ten selections. Miller (15 starts) and Early (11 starts) both saw extensive action as rookies, as did fourth-round pick David Richards, who started every game at right tackle.

1988 San Diego Chargers draft
Round	Pick	Player	Position	College	Notes
1	15	Anthony Miller *	Wide receiver	Tennessee	
3	60	Quinn Early	Wide receiver	Iowa	
4	91	Joe Campbell	Defensive end	New Mexico State	
4	93	Stacy Searels	Tackle	Auburn	
4	98	David Richards	Guard	UCLA	
6	152	Cedric Figaro	Linebacker	Notre Dame	
9	238	Joey Howard	Tackle	Tennessee	
11	285	Ed Miller	Center	Pittsburgh	
11	293	George Hinkle	Defensive end	Arizona	
12	324	Wendell Phillips	Defensive back	North Alabama	
Made roster * Made at least one Pro Bowl during career

== Personnel ==
=== Staff ===
1988 San Diego Chargers staff
Front office: Chairman of the board and president – Alex Spanos; Director of football operations – Steve Ortmayer; Director of player personnel – Chet Franklin; Director of pro personnel – Rudy Feldman; Head coaches: Head coach – Al Saunders; Offensive coaches: Offensive coordinator – Jerry Rhome; Running backs – Bobby Jackson; Receivers – Charlie Joiner; Tight ends – Dave Levy; Offensive line – Jerry Wampfler	Defensive coaches: Defensive coordinator – Ron Lynn; Defensive line – Gunther Cunningham; Linebackers – Mike Haluchak; Special teams coaches: Special teams – Wayne Sevier

=== Roster ===
1988 San Diego Chargers roster
Quarterbacks (QB): 4 Steve Fuller; 12 Babe Laufenberg; 16 Mark Malone; Running backs (RB): 40 Gary Anderson; 26 Lionel James PR; 20 Barry Redden; 24 Kevin Scott; 43 Tim Spencer; Wide receivers (WR): 87 Quinn Early; 89 Darren Flutie; 86 Jamie Holland KR; 83 Anthony Miller KR; Tight ends (TE): 88 Arthur Cox; 81 Anthony Jones	Offensive linemen (OL): 73 Darrick Brilz C/G; 61 Ken Dallafior G; 70 James FitzPatrick G/T; 74 Chris Gambol T; 60 Dennis McKnight G; 65 David Richards T; 66 Dan Rosado C; 76 Broderick Thompson G; Defensive linemen (DL): 95 Joe Campbell DE; 71 Mike Charles NT; 97 George Hinkle NT; 69 Les Miller DE; 91 Leslie O'Neal DE; 75 Joe Phillips DE; 99 Lee Williams DE; 72 Karl Wilson DE	Linebackers (LB): 58 David Brandon OLB; 57 Keith Browner OLB; 51 Cedric Figaro ILB; 52 Jeff Jackson ILB; 50 Gary Plummer ILB; 59 Ken Woodard OLB; Defensive backs (DB): 44 Martin Bayless SS; 23 Roy Bennett CB; 22 Gill Byrd CB; 31 Leonard Coleman CB/S; 25 Vencie Glenn FS; 48 Pat Miller SS; 34 Elvis Patterson CB; 30 Sam Seale CB; Special teams (ST): 6 Steve DeLine K; 94 Randy Kirk LS; 2 Ralf Mojsiejenko P	Reserve: 10 Vince Abbott K (IR); 42 Curtis Adams RB (IR); 84 Brian Bedford WR (IR); 82 Rod Bernstine TE (IR); 77 John Clay T (IR); 53 Chuck Faucette LB (IR); 79 Joey Howard T (IR); 93 Tyrone Keys LB (IR); 68 Gary Kowalski G (IR); 62 Don Macek C (IR); 37 Napoleon McCallum RB (Military); 63 Stacy Searels G/C (IR); 54 Billy Ray Smith LB (IR); 13 Mark Vlasic QB (IR); -- Ronnie Williams TE (IR); Rookies in italics 47 active, 15 reserve

== Preseason ==
Going into preseason, the Chargers' starting quarterback job was up for grabs, with Babe Laufenberg, Mark Malone and Mark Vlasic each given substantial playing time. In the first game, Laufenberg enhanced his case by leading a 4th quarter comeback against Dallas. The Cowboys took a 21–0 lead in the 3rd quarter, and were still up 21–3 when Laufenberg entered the game with 12:40 to play. He led three consecutive touchdown drives to put San Diego ahead, passing to Darren Flutie and Lionel James for scores, either side of a Tim Spencer touchdown run. The victory was confirmed when rookie wide receiver Michael Irvin lost a fumble in the Charger red zone with a minute to play.

Laufenberg struggled the following week, being on the receiving end of four of the seven sacks San Diego gave up in a one-sided loss to the Rams. Both he and Vlasic threw interceptions, while Malone completed 5 of 12 for 45 yards, and was credited by head coach Al Saunders with having shown the most poise. The passing attack improved the following week against San Francisco, as the Chargers built a 27–10 lead before conceding 24 unanswered points to lose. Laufenberg threw a pair of touchdown passes to Quinn Early, and Malone added a third, to Jamie Holland; Holland had 3 catches for 118 yards while rookie Anthony Miller added 5 for 96.

On August 23, Saunders named Laufenberg the probable starter for the opening weekend of the regular season. San Diego then finished their preseason schedule with a second defeat to the Rams, falling behind 31–0 at halftime before recovering to lose by just seven points. Laufenberg played the bulk of the game, finding Flutie for two touchdown passes in the 3rd quarter, and completing 15 of 25 passes for 214 yards.

Week	Date	Opponent	Result	Record	Venue	Attendance
1	August 7	Dallas Cowboys	W 24–21	1–0	Jack Murphy Stadium	40,110
2	August 14	at Los Angeles Rams	L 6–27	1–1	Anaheim Stadium	48,841
3	August 20	San Francisco 49ers	L 27–34	1–2	Jack Murphy Stadium	39,044
4	August 27	Los Angeles Rams	L 24–31	1–3	Jack Murphy Stadium	37,392

== Regular season ==
=== Overview ===
In the absence of Fouts, Winslow and Chandler, the once-mighty Charger passing attack collapsed completely, ranking 26th in the league with 2,388 yards. Only three seasons earlier, San Diego had topped the league with over double the yardage.

Saunders tried three different quarterbacks during the season: Babe Laufenberg, Mark Malone, and second-year pro Mark Vlasic. Each of the trio finished with a passer rating in the 50s - the league average for 1988 was 72.9, and Fouts had posted a rating of at least 70.0 in each of his last 12 seasons in San Diego. The receiving corps lacked experience - Jamie Holland, in his second year, led the team with 536 yards, while rookies Quinn Early and Anthony Miller caught the most touchdowns, with four and three respectively. Darren Flutie, another rookie, caught a pair of touchdowns - thirteen years later, his elder brother Doug would join the Chargers as their starting quarterback.

The running game fared considerably better, thanks in large part to the form of Gary Anderson. After gaining most of his yardage as a receiver out of the backfield during his first three years in San Diego, Anderson was used as a more conventional running back to good effect. Despite missing two games due to injury, his total of 1,119 yards ranked sixth in the league, and his average of 5.0 yards-per-carry was better than any of the five backs above him. Anderson had five 100-yard games, each of which the Chargers won, and rushed for 387 yards in the final two games alone.

On defense, San Diego had a mediocre campaign, ranking 18th for points allowed and 21st for yardage. Linebacker Chip Banks, who had started every non-strike game in 1987, was a holdout. Lee Williams led the team in sacks for the fourth consecutive year, with eleven; Leslie O'Neal saw limited action after missing the previous season through injury, and picked up four sacks in nine games. Linebacker Gary Plummer was credited with a team-leading 118 tackles. Gill Byrd, who had gone without an interception the previous season, rebounded to snag seven - nearly half the team's total of sixteen. Ralf Mojsiejenko's average of 44.1 yards per kick ranked second in the league. Holland and Miller ranked second and third respectively for kickoff return average; they each scored a touchdown return, making San Diego the only team with two such touchdowns.

Before the season, the Chargers made modifications to their uniforms, changing the color of the helmet and jersey from royal blue to a darker navy blue. They also switched the colors on the lightning bolt: it went from a yellow bolt with a white outline to a white bolt with a yellow outline. The team's facemasks also changed from yellow to navy blue. They would keep this helmet and uniform through the 2006 season.

=== Schedule ===
Week	Date	Opponent	Result	Record	Venue	Attendance	Recap
1	September 4	at **Los Angeles Raiders**	**L** 13–24	0–1	Los Angeles Memorial Coliseum	39,029	Recap
2	September 11	at **Denver Broncos**	**L** 3–34	0–2	Mile High Stadium	75,359	Recap
3	September 18	**Seattle Seahawks**	**W** 17–6	1–2	Jack Murphy Stadium	44,449	Recap
4	September 25	at **Kansas City Chiefs**	**W** 24–23	2–2	Arrowhead Stadium	45,498	Recap
5	October 2	**Denver Broncos**	**L** 0–12	2–3	Jack Murphy Stadium	55,763	Recap
6	October 9	New Orleans Saints	**L** 17–23	2–4	Jack Murphy Stadium	42,693	Recap
7	October 16	at Miami Dolphins	**L** 28–31	2–5	Joe Robbie Stadium	58,972	Recap
8	October 23	Indianapolis Colts	**L** 0–16	2–6	Jack Murphy Stadium	37,722	Recap
9	October 30	at **Seattle Seahawks**	**L** 14–17	2–7	Kingdome	59,641	Recap
10	November 6	**Los Angeles Raiders**	**L** 3–13	2–8	Jack Murphy Stadium	55,134	Recap
11	November 13	at Atlanta Falcons	**W** 10–7	3–8	Atlanta–Fulton County Stadium	26,329	Recap
12	November 20	at Los Angeles Rams	**W** 38–24	4–8	Anaheim Stadium	45,462	Recap
13	November 27	San Francisco 49ers	**L** 10–48	4–9	Jack Murphy Stadium	51,484	Recap
14	December 4	at Cincinnati Bengals	**L** 10–27	4–10	Riverfront Stadium	56,866	Recap
15	December 11	Pittsburgh Steelers	**W** 20–14	5–10	Jack Murphy Stadium	33,816	Recap
16	December 18	**Kansas City Chiefs**	**W** 24–13	6–10	Jack Murphy Stadium	26,339	Recap
Note: Intra-division opponents are in **bold** text.

=== Game summaries ===
All game reports use the Pro Football Researchers' gamebook archive as a source.

==== Week 1: at Los Angeles Raiders ====
Week One: San Diego Chargers at Los Angeles Raiders – Game summary

Quarter	1	2	3	4	Total
Chargers	0	3	3	7	**13**
Raiders	0	14	0	10	**24**

at Memorial Coliseum, Los Angeles, California

- Date: September 4
- Game time: 1:00 p.m. PDT
- Game weather: 82 °F (27.8 °C), relative humidity 45%, wind 8 mph
- Game attendance: 39,029
- Referee: Fred Silva
- TV announcers (NBC): Charlie Jones and Jimmy Cefalo
- Box score

Game information

**First quarter**

- No scoring plays.

**Second quarter**

- RAI – Marcus Allen 11-yard run (Chris Bahr kick), 6:26. Raiders 7–0. **Drive: 6 plays, 52 yards, 3:40.**
- SDG – Vince Abbott 23-yard field goal, 1:56. Raiders 7–3. **Drive: 8 plays, 74 yards, 4:30.**
- RAI – Tim Brown 97-yard kickoff return (Chris Bahr kick), 1:43. Raiders 14–3.

**Third quarter**

- SDG – Vince Abbott 33-yard field goal, 8:47. Raiders 14–6. **Drive: 10 plays, 35 yards, 6:13.**

**Fourth quarter**

- RAI – Chris Bahr 25-yard field goal, 7:24. Raiders 17–6. **Drive: 16 plays, 77 yards, 8:00.**
- SDG – Jamie Holland 24-yard pass from Babe Laufenberg (Vince Abbott kick), 3:25. Raiders 17–13. **Drive: 7 plays, 78 yards, 3:59.**
- RAI – Marcus Allen 1-yard run (Chris Bahr kick), 0:21. Raiders 24–13. **Drive: 2 plays, 1 yard, 0:21.**

**Top passers**

- SDG – Babe Laufenberg – 17/29, 195 yards, TD, INT
- RAI – Steve Beuerlein – 13/29, 171 yards

**Top rushers**

- SDG – Gary Anderson – 14 rushes, 38 yards
- RAI – Marcus Allen – 28 rushes, 88 yards, 2 TD

**Top receivers**

- SDG – Quinn Early – 5 receptions, 51 yards
- RAI – Todd Christensen – 4 receptions, 59 yards

The post-Fouts era began with Babe Laufenberg at quarterback. The journeyman failed to lead his offense past midfield on their first five drives, which resulted in four punts and an interception. In the early stages, San Diego's defense held the Raiders at bay, with Lee Williams forcing a fumble in Charger territory; following Laufenberg's error, Los Angeles drove 52 yards and Marcus Allen opened the scoring. Laufenberg then completed passes of 31 and 34 yards to rookies Quinn Early and Anthony Miller, setting up a Vince Abbott field goal. NFL debutant and future Hall of Famer Tim Brown sliced through the Charger coverage on the ensuing kickoff, for a 97-yard touchdown and 14–3 Raider lead at the intermission.

San Diego trimmed the deficit with another Abbott kick after halftime, then drove to a 1st and 10 on the Raider 17, courtesy of Early's 37-yard reverse and Laufenberg's fourth down sneak. From there, the Chargers committed a penalty before losing yardage on three consecutive plays and punting on 4th and 44. After a Raider field goal, San Diego started out on their own 22-yard line with seven minutes to play. Lionel James had receptions of 13 and 31 yards on the next two plays, and Jamie Holland finished the drive with catches of 15 and 24 yards, the latter in the back of the end zone on 4th and 10. Los Angeles picked up one first down in response, before punting to pin the Chargers at their own 11 with 1:31 to play and only one timeout. The offense went backwards from there, with Laufenberg eventually throwing incomplete on 4th and 20 from his own 1-yard line. Allen added an insurance touchdown two plays later.

==== Week 2: at Denver Broncos ====
Week Two: San Diego Chargers at Denver Broncos – Game summary

Quarter	1	2	3	4	Total
Chargers	0	3	0	0	**3**
Broncos	10	14	7	3	**34**

at Mile High Stadium, Denver, Colorado

- Date: September 11
- Game time: 2:00 p.m. MDT
- Game weather: 69 °F (20.6 °C), relative humidity 43%, wind 13 mph
- Game attendance: 75,359
- Referee: Dick Jorgensen
- TV announcers (NBC): Merle Harmon and Paul Hornung
- Box score

Game information

**First quarter**

- DEN – Mark Jackson 44-yard pass from John Elway (Rich Karlis kick), 8:49. Broncos 7–0. **Drive: 4 plays, 60 yards, 1:03.**
- DEN – Rich Karlis 51-yard field goal, 1:50. Broncos 10–0. **Drive: 10 plays, 46 yards, 4:09.**

**Second quarter**

- DEN – Gerald Willhite 1-yard run (Rich Karlis kick), 12:09. Broncos 17–0. **Drive: 6 plays, 49 yards, 3:26.**
- SDG – Vince Abbott 20-yard field goal, 5:30. Broncos 17–3. **Drive: 7 plays, 47 yards, 2:25.**
- DEN – Tony Dorsett 21-yard run (Rich Karlis kick), 2:57. Broncos 24–3. **Drive: 5 plays, 67 yards, 2:33.**

**Third quarter**

- DEN – Vance Johnson 24-yard pass from John Elway (Rich Karlis kick), 11:49. Broncos 31–3. **Drive: 8 plays, 80 yards, 3:11.**

**Fourth quarter**

- DEN – Rich Karlis 38-yard field goal, 10:31. Broncos 34–3. **Drive: 14 plays, 55 yards, 7:59.**

**Top passers**

- SDG – Mark Malone – 11/22, 115 yards, INT
- DEN – John Elway – 17/28, 259 yards, 2 TD

**Top rushers**

- SDG – Curtis Adams – 6 rushes, 35 yards
- DEN – Tony Dorsett – 23 rushes, 113 yards, TD

**Top receivers**

- SDG – Lionel James – 5 receptions, 51 yards
- DEN – Ricky Nattiel – 6 receptions, 85 yards

Babe Laufenberg was chased from the game as Denver thrashed the Chargers. After punting on their first possession, Denver scored 17 points on their next three, which proved to be more than enough to win. Laufenberg completed 2 of 8 passes for just 5 yards, and was replaced by Mark Malone after a 2nd quarter interception. Malone led the Chargers to an Abbott field goal on his first possession, but Denver came straight back with a Tony Dorsett touchdown run to lead 24–3. Lionel James had three receptions for 44 yards on the next drive, but was stopped a yard short when San Diego attempted to convert a 4th and 4 at the Denver 5-yard line. The best Charger chances after halftime were foiled by another failed fourth down try and a Malone interception.

James rushed 4 times for 29 yards, caught 5 passes for 51 yards, and returned 2 punts a total of 31 yards.

==== Week 3: vs. Seattle Seahawks ====
Week Three: Seattle Seahawks at San Diego Chargers – Game summary

Quarter	1	2	3	4	Total
Seahawks	0	3	0	3	**6**
Chargers	7	3	0	7	**17**

at Jack Murphy Stadium, San Diego, California

- Date: September 18
- Game time: 1:00 p.m. PDT
- Game weather: 66 °F (18.9 °C), relative humidity 74%, wind 7 mph
- Game attendance: 44,449
- Referee: Jim Tunney
- TV announcers (NBC): Ray Scott and Merlin Olsen
- Box score

Game information

**First quarter**

- SDG – Keith Browner 55-yard interception return (Vince Abbott kick), 9:27. Chargers 7–0.

**Second quarter**

- SDG – Vince Abbott 48-yard field goal, 13:07. Chargers 10–0. **Drive: 9 plays, 43 yards, 3:13.**
- SEA – Norm Johnson 40-yard field goal, 1:53. Chargers 10–3. **Drive: 11 plays, 58 yards, 5:12.**

**Third quarter**

- No scoring plays.

**Fourth quarter**

- SEA – Norm Johnson 42-yard field goal, 9:27. Chargers 10–6. **Drive: 12 plays, 58 yards, 5:08.**
- SDG – Gary Anderson 25-yard run (Vince Abbott kick), 4:05. Chargers 17–6. **Drive: 9 plays, 76 yards, 5:22.**

**Top passers**

- SEA – Dave Krieg – 9/18, 134 yards, 3 INT
- SDG – Babe Laufenberg – 11/23, 112 yards, INT

**Top rushers**

- SEA – Curt Warner – 18 rushes, 60 yards
- SDG – Gary Anderson – 19 rushes, 120 yards, TD

**Top receivers**

- SEA – Steve Largent – 4 receptions, 71 yards
- SDG – Darren Flutie – 3 receptions, 51 yards

Two interceptions each by Keith Browner and Gill Byrd sparked the Chargers to their first win of the year. Dave Krieg led his team into Charger territory on the game's first possession, before an onrushing Tyrone Keys batted a pass in the air for Browner to intercept behind the line of scrimmage - the linebacker returned the ball 55 yards for a touchdown. Seattle drove right back into Charger territory, but Krieg was picked off by Byrd in the end zone. After forcing a Charger punt, Seattle again threatened, but Vencie Glenn's third down sack forced a 43-yard field goal try by Norm Johnson, which fell short. Abbott made a kick from 48 yards, before Johnson pulled it back to 10–3 at the break.

Laufenberg was intercepted early in the third quarter, but Browning's second interception cancelled out the error two plays later. Abbott missed a field goal on the ensuing drive, and Johnson's second successful kick trimmed the lead to four points with 9:27 to play in the final quarter. San Diego then put together a crucial 9-play, 76-yard touchdown drive, with Laufenberg producing two third downs completions and Gary Anderson rushing four times for 49 yards; Anderson faked a reverse and scored on a 25-yard sweep with 4:05 to play. Byrd's goal line interception ensured there would be no late scare.

Anderson finished with 19 carries for 120 yards and a touchdown, and the Chargers won despite producing only 78 net passing yards.

==== Week 4: at Kansas City Chiefs ====
Week Four: San Diego Chargers at Kansas City Chiefs – Game summary

Quarter	1	2	3	4	Total
Chargers	14	0	0	10	**24**
Chiefs	0	14	9	0	**23**

at Arrowhead Stadium, Kansas City, Missouri

- Date: September 25
- Game time: 3:00 p.m. CDT
- Game weather: 64 °F (17.8 °C), relative humidity 63%, wind 8 mph
- Game attendance: 45,498
- Referee: Pat Haggerty
- TV announcers (NBC): Ray Scott and Merlin Olsen
- Box score

Game information

**First quarter**

- SDG – Quinn Early 38-yard pass from Babe Laufenberg (Vince Abbott kick), 5:11. Chargers 7–0. **Drive: 9 plays, 80 yards, 4:17.**
- SDG – Gary Anderson 30-yard run (Vince Abbott kick), 1:08. Chargers 14–0. **Drive: 6 plays, 60 yards, 1:45.**

**Second quarter**

- KAN – Paul Palmer 71-yard pass from Steve DeBerg (Nick Lowery kick), 14:49. Chargers 14–7. **Drive: 3 plays, 80 yards, 1:19.**
- KAN – Stephone Paige 2-yard pass from Steve DeBerg (Nick Lowery kick), 0:18. Tied 14–14. **Drive: 8 plays, 58 yards, 1:07.**

**Third quarter**

- KAN – Paul Palmer 6-yard pass from Steve DeBerg (Nick Lowery kick), 5:08. Chiefs 21–14. **Drive: 13 plays, 80 yards, 5:13.**
- KAN – Safety, Bill Maas sacked Babe Laufenberg in end zone, 3:35. Chiefs 23–14.

**Fourth quarter**

- SDG – Vince Abbott 47-yard field goal, 8:13. Chiefs 23–17. **Drive: 6 plays, 37 yards, 2:19.**
- SDG – Lionel James 9-yard pass from Babe Laufenberg (Vince Abbott kick), 0:52. Chargers 24–23. **Drive: 13 plays, 61 yards, 5:50.**

**Top passers**

- SDG – Babe Laufenberg – 13/25, 167 yards, 2 TD, INT
- KAN – Steve DeBerg – 20/38, 261 yards, 3 TD, INT

**Top rushers**

- SDG – Gary Anderson – 23 rushes, 131 yards, TD
- KAN – Paul Palmer – 17 rushes, 76 yards

**Top receivers**

- SDG – Quinn Early – 3 receptions, 63 yards, TD
- KAN – Paul Palmer – 5 receptions, 122 yards, 2 TD

A fast start and thrilling finish saw the Chargers level their record at 2–2. San Diego forced the Chiefs to punt on their first two possessions, while the offense came to life with touchdown drives of 80 and 60 yards. Laufenberg went deep over the middle to Quinn Early for the first score, before Anderson, who rushed six times for 70 yards across the two drives, veered outside right end and raced past the Kansas City defense for a 30-yard touchdown.

The Chiefs dominated the second and third quarters. Three plays after Anderson scored, Steve DeBerg found Paul Palmer behind the secondary for a 72-yard touchdown on 3rd and 1. A Laufenberg interception was turned into another DeBerg touchdown pass and a halftime tie. In the 3rd quarter, Palmer caught a deflected pass for another score, capping a 13-play, 80-yard drive. The Kansas City run reached 23 unanswered points with a safety after Laufenberg was ruled "in the grasp" in the end zone, and they were threatening more when they reached a 2nd and 4 at the Charger 10. Chuck Faucette's interception kept San Diego in the game heading into the final quarter.

Martin Bayless sacked DeBerg with 11 minutes to play, forcing a Chiefs punt, and Abbott made a 47-yard field goal shortly afterwards. After Kansas City went three-and-out, the Chargers began the game-winning drive at their own 39 with 6:42 on the clock. Following a sack, Laufenberg faced a 3rd and 18 but converted it with a 19-yard completion to Lionel James over the middle. He scrambled for 13 more yards on the next play, then converted a 4th and 6 with a throw on the run to Anthony Miller, good for 14 yards. Three runs netted ten more yards, and a 1st and goal at the 9. Laufenberg then threw an interception under pressure from Tim Cofield, but Cofield drove the quarterback to the ground and was penalised for roughing the passer, negating the turnover. Two plays later, the Chargers took advantage of the second chance. James caught a short pass near the left sideline and dove over the goal line just inside the pylon with 52 seconds to play. This stood as the winning score after Kansas City went backwards on their final drive.

Anderson rushed 23 times, for 131 yards and a touchdown. He was the first Charger to post consecutive 100-yard rushing games since Chuck Muncie in the final two games of 1982.

==== Week 5: vs. Denver Broncos ====
Week Five: Denver Broncos at San Diego Chargers – Game summary

Quarter	1	2	3	4	Total
Broncos	6	0	3	3	**12**
Chargers	0	0	0	0	**0**

at Jack Murphy Stadium, San Diego, California

- Date: October 2
- Game time: 1:00 p.m. PDT
- Game weather: 66 °F (18.9 °C), relative humidity 83%, wind 9 mph
- Game attendance: 55,763
- Referee: Johnny Grier
- TV announcers (NBC): Ray Scott and Joe Namath
- Box score

Game information

**First quarter**

- DEN – Rich Karlis 30-yard field goal, 10:03. Broncos 3–0. **Drive: 7 plays, 27 yards, 2:11.**
- DEN – Rich Karlis 43-yard field goal, 0:59. Broncos 6–0. **Drive: 7 plays, 48 yards, 2:31.**

**Second quarter**

- No scoring plays.

**Third quarter**

- DEN – Rich Karlis 30-yard field goal, 4:11. Broncos 9–0. **Drive: 18 plays, 75 yards, 9:21.**

**Fourth quarter**

- DEN – Rich Karlis 28-yard field goal, 8:56. Broncos 12–0. **Drive: 4 plays, 9 yards, 1:27.**

**Top passers**

- DEN – John Elway – 17/29, 184 yards, INT
- SDG – Babe Laufenberg – 11/21, 104 yards

**Top rushers**

- DEN – Sammy Winder – 11 rushes, 52 yards
- SDG – Gary Anderson – 10 rushes, 16 yards

**Top receivers**

- DEN – Steve Sewell – 3 receptions, 53 yards
- SDG – Darren Flutie – 4 receptions, 38 yards

Denver shut down Anderson (10 carries for 16 yards), and with him the Charger offense. San Diego failed to pass midfield on their first five drives of the game, though Denver also struggled, managing only two Rich Karlis field goals from three attempts. Gill Byrd intercepted John Elway late in the half, and San Diego reached the Denver 17 before Abbott had a field goal blocked (Denver also blocked a punt in the second half).

The Broncos attempted field goals on each of their first three-second half drives, with Karlis again converting two of them. Mark Malone then entered the game, completing four of his first five passes to reach a 2nd and 4 at the Denver 40, before being intercepted by Mike Harden. After Karlis missed his seventh field goal try of the game, the Chargers had one final chance - this time, they got as far as the Denver 14 before Malone threw four straight incompletions, the last with 39 seconds to play.

San Diego mustered 190 yards on offense, with just 20 on the ground - both would stand as season lows. The defense had four sacks, including three by Lee Williams. Fourteen-year veteran center Don Macek sustained a season-ending shoulder injury during the game, and was replaced by Dan Rosado. It was the 150th start of Macek's career, and would prove to be the last.

==== Week 6: vs. New Orleans Saints ====
Week Six: New Orleans Saints at San Diego Chargers – Game summary

Quarter	1	2	3	4	Total
Saints	0	13	7	3	**23**
Chargers	14	0	3	0	**17**

at Jack Murphy Stadium, San Diego, California

- Date: October 9
- Game time: 1:00 p.m. PDT
- Game weather: 72 °F (22.2 °C), relative humidity 51%, wind 9 mph
- Game attendance: 42,693
- Referee: Ben Dreith
- TV announcers (CBS): Tim Ryan and Dan Jiggetts
- Box score

Game information

**First quarter**

- SDG – Anthony Miller 47-yard pass from Babe Laufenberg (Vince Abbott kick), 10:59. Chargers 7–0. **Drive: 7 plays, 80 yards, 3:55.**
- SDG – Roy Bennett recovered block punt in end zone (Vince Abbott kick), 9:09. Chargers 14–0.

**Second quarter**

- NO – Morten Andersen 27-yard field goal, 9:28. Chargers 14–3. **Drive: 9 plays, 46 yards, 3:55.**
- NO – Morten Andersen 35-yard field goal, 5:17. Chargers 14–6. **Drive: 4 plays, 9 yards, 1:44.**
- NO – Lonzell Hill 19-yard pass from Bobby Hebert (Morten Andersen kick), 3:21. Chargers 14–13. **Drive: 3 plays, 25 yards, 1:36.**

**Third quarter**

- NO – Eric Martin 10-yard pass from Bobby Hebert (Morten Andersen kick), 9:47. Saints 20–14. **Drive: 12 plays, 76 yards, 5:04.**
- SDG – Vince Abbott 35-yard field goal, 5:11. Saints 23–14. **Drive: 10 plays, 73 yards, 4:29.**

**Fourth quarter**

- NO – Morten Andersen 34-yard field goal, 6:16. Saints 23–17. **Drive: 8 plays, 36 yards, 3:24.**

**Top passers**

- NO – Bobby Hebert – 22/36, 234 yards, 2 TD
- SDG – Babe Laufenberg – 7/20, 120 yards, TD, INT

**Top rushers**

- NO – Dalton Hilliard – 17 rushes, 56 yards
- SDG – Curtis Adams – 15 rushes, 48 yards

**Top receivers**

- NO – Eric Martin – 5 receptions, 75 yards, TD
- SDG – Anthony Miller – 3 receptions, 81 yards, TD

A fast start came to nothing as New Orleans reeled in the Chargers. San Diego's opening drive seemed to have stalled, but the Saints were offsides on a punt, giving the Chargers a new set of downs. Two plays later, Laufenberg connected with Miller for a 47-yard touchdown - the receiver caught the ball in stride on a slanting pattern from left to right, easily outrunning the defense for his first career score. In reply, New Orleans went three-and-out; when they attempted to punt, Vencie Glenn burst untouched through the middle of the line to block the kick, with Roy Bennett recovering in the end zone.

In reply, New Orleans drove all the way from their own 8 to the Charger 3, but on the 17th play of the drive Lee Williams hit Bobby Hebert from behind, causing the ball to pop right into the hands of Tyrone Keys. The Saints kept pressing, and scored with field goals on their next two drives, either side of a Laufenberg interception. Curtis Adams, who saw increased playing time in this game due to an injury to Anderson, fumbled on the next play from scrimmage, and Hebert's touchdown pass made it a one-point game at halftime.

Hebert threw for another score on the first drive of the 3rd quarter. In response, Laufenberg converted a 3rd and 19 with a 20-yard completion to Miller, leading to an Abbott field goal. Laufenberg again converted a 3rd and 19 on the next Charger drive, this time with a 23-yard scramble into Saints territory, but the quarterback was sacked two plays later and the Chargers had to punt. They went three-and-out on their next possession, and New Orleans added a field goal. With time running out, Mark Malone was given a chance, but the Chargers could muster only eight yards before punting again. New Orleans then converted a pair of 3rd and 1 situations, and ran out the final 4:19 of the game.

Laufenberg was 7 of 20 for 120 yards, with a touchdown and an interception - this would be the last game he started in San Diego. Miller finished with 3 receptions for 81 yards and a touchdown, which would prove to be the most yards a Charger receiver managed in any game in the 1988 season.

==== Week 7: at Miami Dolphins ====
Week Seven: San Diego Chargers at Miami Dolphins – Game summary

Quarter	1	2	3	4	Total
Chargers	7	14	7	0	**28**
Dolphins	7	3	7	14	**31**

at Joe Robbie Stadium, Miami, Florida

- Date: October 16
- Game time: 4:00 p.m. EDT
- Game weather: 78 °F (25.6 °C), relative humidity 63%, wind 14 mph
- Game attendance: 58,972
- Referee: Tom Dooley
- TV announcers (NBC): Charlie Jones and Merlin Olsen
- Box score

Game information

**First quarter**

- SDG – Quinn Early 15-yard pass from Mark Malone (Vince Abbott kick), 10:10. Chargers 7–0. **Drive: 7 plays, 87 yards, 3:50.**
- MIA – Mark Duper 6-yard pass from Dan Marino (Fuad Reveiz kick), 3:39. Tied 7–7. **Drive: 10 plays, 80 yards, 4:01.**

**Second quarter**

- MIA – Fuad Reveiz 22-yard field goal, 6:59. Dolphins 10–7. **Drive: 17 plays, 82 yards, 8:48.**
- SDG – Mark Malone 1-yard run (Vince Abbott kick), 1:16. Chargers 14–10. **Drive: 13 plays, 81 yards, 6:43.**
- SDG – Darren Flutie 21-yard pass from Mark Malone (Vince Abbott kick), 0:30. Chargers 21–10. **Drive: 4 plays, 31 yards, 0:36.**

**Third quarter**

- MIA – Lorenzo Hampton 2-yard run (Fuad Reveiz kick), 12:01. Chargers 21–17. **Drive: 3 plays, 14 yards, 1:36.**
- SDG – Curtis Adams 1-yard run (Vince Abbott kick), 7:38. Chargers 28–17. **Drive: 9 plays, 73 yards, 4:23.**

**Fourth quarter**

- MIA – Lorenzo Hampton 1-yard run (Fuad Reveiz kick), 14:51. Chargers 28–24. **Drive: 10 plays, 85 yards, 2:59.**
- MIA – Tony Stradford 3-yard run (Fuad Reveiz kick), 11:25. Dolphins 31–28. **Drive: 4 plays, 59 yards, 2:21.**

**Top passers**

- SDG – Mark Malone – 25/38, 294 yards, 2 TD, 2 INT
- MIA – Dan Marino – 26/45, 329 yards, TD

**Top rushers**

- SDG – Curtis Adams – 13 rushes, 58 yards, TD
- MIA – Troy Stradford – 11 rushes, 28 yards, TD
  MIA – Lorenzo Hampton – 10 rushes, 28 yards, 2 TD

**Top receivers**

- SDG – Jamie Holland – 4 receptions, 71 yards
- MIA – Mark Duper – 17 receptions, 118 yards, TD

San Diego's best offensive output of the season came to nothing as Miami overcame an 11-point deficit in the final quarter. Mark Malone went 5 for 5 in his first drive as the new starting quarterback, finishing with a 32-yard completion to Jamie Holland and a 15-yard touchdown to Early. Dan Marino led drives of 80 and 82 yards, resulting in a touchdown and a field goal. Down 7–10, Malone responded by converting third downs with both his legs and his arm before capping a 13-play, 81-yard drive by jumping and reaching the ball over the goal line on 3rd and goal from inside the one. That score came with 76 seconds to play in the half, but there was time for more Charger points, Leonard Coleman recovering a fumble and Malone finding Darren Flutie over the middle for a 21-yard touchdown.

James fumbled early in the second half, setting up a Miami touchdown, before Malone's 33-yard completion to Early led to Curtis Adams' short-range score in response. The Chargers threatened more points on their next possession, but had to punt after Malone was sacked. Nine Marino completions accounted for all but the final yard of an 85-yard touchdown drive and, following another James fumble, Marino's 51-yard completion to Mark Duper came two plays before Troy Stradford gave Miami the lead; two Dolphins' touchdowns had come only 3:26 apart. There were still over 11 minutes to play, but no more points followed. San Diego's best chance ended with Malone being intercepted on 1st and 10 from the Miami 44, and the quarterback's final desperation pass was picked off inside the Dolphin five as time expired.

Malone was 25 of 38 for 294 yards, two touchdowns and two interceptions, the highest yardage total by a Charger quarterback all season. Marino, 26 of 45 for 329 yards and a touchdown, was the only opposing quarterback to pass for over 300 yards on the Charger defense in 1988.

==== Week 8: vs. Indianapolis Colts ====
Week Eight: Indianapolis Colts at San Diego Chargers – Game summary

Quarter	1	2	3	4	Total
Colts	3	3	3	7	**16**
Chargers	0	0	0	0	**0**

at Jack Murphy Stadium, San Diego, California

- Date: October 23
- Game time: 1:00 p.m. PDT
- Game weather: 63 °F (17.2 °C), relative humidity 89%, wind 7 mph
- Game attendance: 37,722
- Referee: Fred Silva
- TV announcers (NBC): Fred Roggin and Jerry Kramer
- Box score

Game information

**First quarter**

- IND – Dean Biasucci 20-yard field goal, 10:03. Colts 3–0. **Drive: 13 plays, 97 yards, 4:57.**

**Second quarter**

- IND – Dean Biasucci 44-yard field goal, 0:00. Colts 6–0. **Drive: 7 plays, 36 yards, 1:09.**

**Third quarter**

- IND – Dean Biasucci 51-yard field goal, 5:54. Colts 9–0. **Drive: 14 plays, 53 yards, 6:32.**

**Fourth quarter**

- IND – Matt Bouza 25-yard pass from Gary Hogeboom (Dean Biasucci kick), 4:43. Colts 16–0. **Drive: 7 plays, 50 yards, 4:06.**

**Top passers**

- IND – Gary Hogeboom– 11/19, 132 yards, TD
- SDG – Mark Malone – 13/30, 121 yards

**Top rushers**

- IND – Eric Dickerson – 30 rushes, 169 yards
- SDG – Gary Anderson – 14 rushes, 70 yards

**Top receivers**

- IND – Matt Bouza – 5 receptions, 86 yards, TD
  IND – Clarence Verdin – 5 receptions, 86 yards
- SDG – Quinn Early – 2 receptions, 35 yards

An inability to finish drives saw the Chargers shut out for the second time in four games. San Diego picked up at least one first down on eight of their nine drives, and had possession in Colt territory on seven of them, but repeatedly wound up punting from close to midfield. Indianapolis had their own offensive troubles - after an early 97-yard field goal drive, quarterback Chris Chandler was intercepted on three consecutive possessions. These included two by Leonard Coleman in the end zone (Vencie Glenn had the other).

With San Diego unable to reach scoring range, the Colts padded their lead with two field further field goals and, after Malone threw incomplete on 4th and 3 from the Indianapolis 49, drove the other way for the clinching touchdown with 3:43 to play. San Diego had their best penetration of the game on their final possession, but Malone threw four consecutive incompletions from the Colt 25, and the shutout was completed.

Anderson returned from a two-game absence, and gained 70 yards on 14 carries; he was overshadowed by Eric Dickerson, whose 169 yards on 30 carries represented the highest total a Charger opponent had gained for four years. The Colts enjoyed a 453–239 advantage in total yardage.

==== Week 9: at Seattle Seahawks ====
Week Nine: San Diego Chargers at Seattle Seahawks – Game summary

Quarter	1	2	3	4	Total
Chargers	0	0	0	14	**14**
Seahawks	3	7	0	7	**17**

at Kingdome, Seattle, Washington

- Date: October 30
- Game time: 1:00 p.m. PST
- Game weather: N/A (game played indoors)
- Game attendance: 59,641
- Referee: Red Cashion
- TV announcers (NBC): Jim Donovan and Larry Csonka
- Box score

Game information

**First quarter**

- SEA – Norm Johnson 26-yard field goal, 1:39. Seahawks 3–0. **Drive: 10 plays, 35 yards, 5:09.**

**Second quarter**

- SEA – Brian Blades 23-yard pass from Kelly Stouffer (Norm Johnson kick), 0:52. Seahawks 10–0. **Drive: 9 plays, 68 yards, 4:01.**

**Third quarter**

- No scoring plays.

**Fourth quarter**

- SDG – Anthony Miller 11-yard pass from Mark Malone (Vince Abbott kick), 13:11. Seahawks 10–7. **Drive: 7 plays, 80 yards, 3:13.**
- SEA – John L. Williams 6-yard pass from Kelly Stouffer (Norm Johnson kick), 3:43. Seahawks 17–7. **Drive: 11 plays, 58 yards, 5:19.**
- SDG – Anthony Miller 10-yard pass from Mark Malone (Vince Abbott kick), 0:53. Seahawks 17–14. **Drive: 12 plays, 84 yards, 2:39.**

**Top passers**

- SDG – Mark Malone – 20/32, 169 yards, 2 TD, INT
- SEA – Kelly Stouffer – 14/28, 121 yards, 2 TD

**Top rushers**

- SDG – Tim Spencer – 8 rushes, 69 yards
- SEA – John L. Williams – 15 rushes, 73 yards

**Top receivers**

- SDG – Jamie Holland – 5 receptions, 53 yards
- SEA – Steve Largent – 3 receptions, 37 yards

San Diego's offensive struggles continued as they lost a key divisional game to the Seahawks. Despite coming into the game with a 2–6 record, the Chargers could have drawn to within a game of the AFC West summit with a win. Their best chance of the opening three-quarters was a 49-yard field goal, missed by Abbott. Seattle capitalised on a fumbled exchange between Malone and Anderson to score a field goal, and added a touchdown shortly before halftime. Trailing 0–10 with 15 minutes to play, San Diego had gone eight complete quarters without scoring a point.

They broke their drought with 13 minutes to play. Tim Spencer carried four times for 52 yards on an 80-yard drive, which finished when Malone beat the blitz to find Miller on a quick slant in the front of the end zone. A Williams sack saw the Seahawks go three-and-out, and the Chargers reached a 2nd and 7 at the Seattle 42. Malone then fumbled the snap and Seattle recovered; they drove 58 yards the other way, scoring a crucial touchdown when John L. Williams narrowly broke the plane of the end zone on 3rd and goal. Taking over with 3:32 to play, Malone passed on every play of an 84-yard touchdown drive, completing 9 of 12 and finding Miller for another touchdown. Steve Largent recovered the ensuing onside kick, and Seattle ran out the remaining 53 seconds.

San Diego outgained the Seahawks 299–235, but committed all three of the game's turnovers.

==== Week 10: vs. Los Angeles Raiders ====
Week Ten: Los Angeles Raiders at San Diego Chargers – Game summary

Quarter	1	2	3	4	Total
Raiders	0	3	0	10	**13**
Chargers	3	0	0	0	**3**

at Jack Murphy Stadium, San Diego, California

- Date: November 6
- Game time: 5:00 p.m. PST
- Game weather: 61 °F (16.1 °C), relative humidity 89%, wind 7 mph
- Game attendance: 55,134
- Referee: Jim Tunney
- TV announcers (ESPN): Mike Patrick and Joe Theismann
- Box score

Game information

**First quarter**

- SDG – Vince Abbott 40-yard field goal, 4:00. Chargers 3–0. **Drive: 8 plays, 75 yards, 2:35.**

**Second quarter**

- RAI – Chris Bahr 36-yard field goal, 6:24. Tied 3–3. **Drive: 4 plays, -9 yards, 1:20.**

**Third quarter**

- No scoring plays.

**Fourth quarter**

- RAI – Trey Junkin 7-yard pass from Steve Beuerlein (Chris Bahr kick), 12:24. Raiders 10–3. **Drive: 9 plays, 58 yards, 3:56.**
- RAI – Chris Bahr 29-yard field goal, 4:50. Raiders 13–3. **Drive: 11 plays, 55 yards, 7:02.**

**Top passers**

- RAI – Steve Beuerlein – 13/28, 182 yards, TD, INT
- SDG – Mark Malone – 12/25, 147 yards, 2 INT

**Top rushers**

- RAI – Marcus Allen – 17 rushes, 67 yards
- SDG – Gary Anderson – 9 rushes, 22 yards

**Top receivers**

- RAI – Mervyn Fernandez – 2 receptions, 61 yards
- SDG – Jamie Holland – 3 receptions, 68 yards

Another weak offensive performance saw the Chargers drop their sixth straight game. Malone started well, his 42-yard completion to Holland setting up Abbott's field goal 11 minutes into the game. Billy Ray Smith's end zone interception on the next drive temporarily preserved the lead, but the offense didn't cross the Raider 40 again all game. Los Angeles also found points hard to come by, but levelled the score in the 2nd quarter, and eventually went ahead through a Steve Beuerlein touchdown pass 12:24 from the end of the game. San Diego gained a first down at the Raider 47 in response, but Malone threw his second interception, and the Raiders added a field goal.

San Diego tried Laufenberg at quarterback for their final drive; he made a pair of first down passes, but was sacked twice and eventually threw incomplete on 4th and 33. Malone finished up 12 of 25 for 147 yards and two interceptions - he temporarily lost the starting job after this performance.

==== Week 11: at Atlanta Falcons ====
Week Eleven: San Diego Chargers at Atlanta Falcons – Game summary

Quarter	1	2	3	4	Total
Chargers	0	3	0	7	**10**
Falcons	0	0	0	7	**7**

at Fulton County Stadium, Atlanta, Georgia

- Date: November 13
- Game time: 1:00 p.m. EST
- Game weather: 54 °F (12.2 °C), relative humidity 75%, wind 9 mph
- Game attendance: 26,329
- Referee: Gene Barth
- TV announcers (NBC): Jim Donovan and Jon Morris
- Box score

Game information

**First quarter**

- No scoring plays.

**Second quarter**

- SDG – Vince Abbott 23-yard field goal, 6:07. Chargers 7–0. **Drive: 6 plays, 21 yards, 2:49.**

**Third quarter**

- No scoring plays.

**Fourth quarter**

- SDG – Barry Redden 5-yard run (Vince Abbott kick), 4:32. Chargers 10–0. **Drive: 5 plays, 73 yards, 2:31.**
- ATL – Michael Haynes 22-yard pass from Chris Miller (Greg Davis kick), 2:43. Chargers 10–7. **Drive: 10 plays, 65 yards, 5:19.**

**Top passers**

- SDG – Mark Vlasic – 16/32, 190 yards, 2 INT
- ATL – Chris Miller – 18/38, 201 yards, TD, INT

**Top rushers**

- SDG – Gary Anderson – 24 rushes, 145 yards
- ATL – John Settle – 14 rushes, 25 yards

**Top receivers**

- SDG – Jamie Holland – 5 receptions, 74 yards
- ATL – John Settle – 10 receptions, 106 yards

Newly promoted Mark Vlasic won his first start, though the defense earned most of the credit. Both kickers missed field goals in the first half, before James' 14-yard punt return set the Chargers up at the Atlanta 26, and they drove close enough for Abbott to hit a chip shot 23-yarder. A fumble recovery by Glenn soon gave them a chance to extend the lead, taking over at the Atlanta 24. On the next three plays, Vlasic threw incomplete, was sacked and then finally intercepted, and the score remained 3–0 at halftime. The 3rd quarter produced no further points, with Keys blocking an Atlanta field goal try.

The lone Charger touchdown drive began at their own 27 with 7:03 remaining in the game. After a 2-yard run by Anderson, Rod Bernstine took a short pass over the middle, shrugged off two tacklers close to midfield, and broke up the right sideline before being corralled at the Falcon 14, a gain of 57 yards. Three plays later, Barry Redden scored on a 5-yard run up the middle with 4:32 to play. Atlanta broke the shutout shortly after the two-minute warning, but Holland recovered the ensuing onside kick, and Anderson broke off a 26-yard run as San Diego ran the clock out.

Vlasic was 16 of 32 for 190 yards, with two interceptions, while Anderson carried 24 times for 145 yards.

This was the Chargers' first appearance in Atlanta, the first meeting vs. the Falcons since 1979, and only the third match between the clubs all time. San Diego was scheduled to play at Atlanta-Fulton County Stadium in 1982, but the game was cancelled due to the 57-day National Football League Players Association strike that season.

==== Week 12: at Los Angeles Rams ====
Week Twelve: San Diego Chargers at Los Angeles Rams – Game summary

Quarter	1	2	3	4	Total
Chargers	14	3	7	14	**38**
Rams	7	7	0	10	**24**

at Anaheim Stadium, Anaheim, California

- Date: November 20
- Game time: 1:00 p.m. PST
- Game weather: 55 °F (12.8 °C), relative humidity 62%, wind 6 mph
- Game attendance: 45,462
- Referee: Pat Haggerty
- TV announcers (NBC): Tom Hammond and Joe Namath
- Box score

Game information

**First quarter**

- SDG – Quinn Early 4-yard pass from Mark Vlasic (Steve DeLine kick), 9:29. Chargers 7–0. **Drive: 9 plays, 39 yards, 3:41.**
- RAM – Pete Holohan 4-yard pass from Jim Everett (Mike Lansford kick), 6:27. Tied 7–7. **Drive: 5 plays, 24 yards, 3:02.**
- SDG – Anthony Miller 93-yard kickoff return (Steve DeLine kick), 6:10. Chargers 14–7.

**Second quarter**

- SDG – Steve DeLine 38-yard field goal, 13:47. Chargers 17–7. **Drive: 11 plays, 60 yards, 5:55.**
- RAM – Greg Bell 12-yard run (Mike Lansford kick), 11:01. Chargers 17–14. **Drive: 5 plays, 70 yards, 2:46.**

**Third quarter**

- SDG – Sam Seale 50-yard lateral from Keith Browner after fumble recovery and 25-yard return (Steve DeLine kick), 6:22. Chargers 24–14.

**Fourth quarter**

- RAM – Mike Lansford 20-yard field goal, 14:13. Chargers 24–17. **Drive: 6 plays, 9 yards, 1:52.**
- SDG – Barry Redden 1-yard run (Steve DeLine kick), 9:08. Chargers 31–17. **Drive: 8 plays, 67 yards, 5:05.**
- RAM – Aaron Cox 20-yard pass from Jim Everett (Mike Lansford kick), 8:14. Chargers 31–24. **Drive: 3 plays, 68 yards, 0:54.**
- SDG – Barry Redden 1-yard run (Steve DeLine kick), 5:26. Chargers 38–24. **Drive: 5 plays, 80 yards, 2:48.**

**Top passers**

- SDG – Mark Malone – 4/6, 128 yards, INT
- RAM – Jim Everett – 17/34, 243 yards, 2 TD, INT

**Top rushers**

- SDG – Gary Anderson – 14 rushes, 53 yards
- RAM – Greg Bell – 14 rushes, 83 yards, TD

**Top receivers**

- SDG – Rod Bernstine – 2 receptions, 70 yards
- RAM – Flipper Anderson – 4 receptions, 94 yards

Several big plays sparked San Diego to a creditable road win over the 7-4 Rams. On the first Charger drive, Anderson broke off a 19-yard run to the three-yard line, leading to Quinn Early's touchdown catch on 3rd and goal. Rams returner Ron Brown then broke off a 72-yard return, and the Rams were level shortly afterwards. Miller did even better, returning the ensuing kickoff 93 yards for a touchdown - he started out towards the left side of the field, weaved inside several tacklers, and broke to the right sideline, where he beat the last defender for pace. Anderson had three double-digit gains on the next Charger drive, which went 60 yards and culminated in a Steve DeLine field goal (DeLine was in for Abbott, who had sustained a career-ending knee injury against Atlanta). Williams appeared to have recovered a fumble in Rams territory soon afterwards, but the takeaway was overruled on replay review, and Los Angeles went on to score a touchdown from that drive. At halftime, it was 17–14 to San Diego.

Leslie O'Neal tipped a Jim Everett pass early in the third quarter, and Elvis Patterson intercepted at the Ram 44. The Chargers did nothing with that opportunity, but took full advantage of their next takeaway. On a 1st and 10 from the San Diego 30, Charles White fumbled, and Keith Browner plucked the ball out of the air. As he was being tackled on the return, he flipped the ball to Sam Seale, who took it the final 50 yards to the end zone. The Browner-to-Seale pass appeared to have gone forwards, but the score stood. On the next Charger possession, Vlasic injured a knee while being knocked down after a pass attempt; Malone entered the game, but was immediately intercepted, leading to a Rams field goal.

Malone redeemed himself with a 49-yard bomb to Miller, leading to a one-yard Redden touchdown. Everett came back with three straight completions, the last a touchdown that pulled the deficit back down to seven points, with over eight minutes still to play. Facing a 3rd and 6 soon afterwards, Malone connected with Bernstine on a 59-yard completion to the Rams one yard line, from where Redden scored again on the next play. The Chargers saw out the final 5:26 without difficulty.

Anderson finished with 53 rushing yards and 42 receiving yards. It was the only Charger win all year in which he did not post a 100-yard rushing game, but his 95 yards from scrimmage did lead the team. Aside from his brace of 1-yard touchdowns, Redden lost two yards on his only carry, leaving him with zero yards but two touchdowns on the day. Lee Williams had three of the Chargers' five sacks.

==== Week 13: vs. San Francisco 49ers ====
Week Thirteen: San Francisco 49ers at San Diego Chargers – Game summary

Quarter	1	2	3	4	Total
49ers	7	17	14	10	**48**
Chargers	0	7	3	0	**10**

at Jack Murphy Stadium, San Diego, California

- Date: November 27
- Game time: 1:00 p.m. PST
- Game weather: 57 °F (13.9 °C), relative humidity 77%, wind 7 mph
- Game attendance: 51,484
- Referee: Ben Dreith
- TV announcers (CBS): Greg Gumbel and Ken Stabler
- Box score

Game information

**First quarter**

- SF – Jerry Rice 96-yard pass from Joe Montana (Mike Cofer kick), 4:43. 49ers 7–0. **Drive: 1 play, 96 yards, 0:12.**

**Second quarter**

- SF – Roger Craig 1-yard run (Mike Cofer kick), 12:01. 49ers 14–0. **Drive: 3 plays, 23 yards, 1:21.**
- SDG – Mark Malone 36-yard run (Steve DeLine kick), 10:20. 49ers 14–7. **Drive: 4 plays, 65 yards, 1:35.**
- SF – Roger Craig 2-yard pass from Joe Montana (Mike Cofer kick), 5:49. 49ers 21–7. **Drive: 10 plays, 75 yards, 4:22.**
- SF – Mike Cofer 45-yard field goal, 0:00. 49ers 24–7. **Drive: 5 plays, 35 yards, 0:26.**

**Third quarter**

- SF – Jerry Rice 41-yard pass from Joe Montana (Mike Cofer kick), 13:30. 49ers 31–7. **Drive: 5 plays, 76 yards, 1:22.**
- SDG – Steve DeLine 23-yard field goal, 7:09. 49ers 31–10. **Drive: 11 plays, 54 yards, 6:12.**
- SF – Roger Craig 7-yard run (Mike Cofer kick), 2:32. 49ers 38–10. **Drive: 12 plays, 72 yards, 4:26.**

**Fourth quarter**

- SF – Mike Cofer 32-yard field goal, 12:47. 49ers 41–10. **Drive: 8 plays, 29 yards, 4:19.**
- SF – Doug DuBose 37-yard run (Mike Cofer kick), 2:52. 49ers 48–10. **Drive: 10 plays, 90 yards, 5:48.**

**Top passers**

- SF – Joe Montana – 14/22, 271 yards, 3 TD
- SDG – Mark Malone – 17/32, 136 yards, 2 INT

**Top rushers**

- SF – Roger Craig – 17 rushes, 87 yards, 2 TD
- SDG – Gary Anderson – 14 rushes, 61 yards

**Top receivers**

- SF – Jerry Rice – 6 receptions, 171 yards, 2 TD
- SDG – Rod Bernstine – 9 receptions, 80 yards

San Diego were brought back down to earth by the eventual Super Bowl champions. The Chargers missed an early scoring chance when Anderson fumbled in the 49er red zone. Later in the opening quarter, Jerry Rice caught a 96-yard touchdown from Joe Montana, and San Francisco were ahead to stay. Malone, reinstated in the starting line-up, was intercepted by Ronnie Lott to set up the second 49er touchdown. San Diego mustered some resistance then: Anderson broke off a 26-yard run, and Malone swept 36 yards for a touchdown on a QB keeper. This remains the longest run by a quarterback in franchise history.

The 49ers quashed any thoughts of a comeback with a 75-yard touchdown drive; though San Diego had sporadic threats after that, they could muster only three more points, while San Francisco steadily pulled away. Rice added a 41-yard touchdown in the 3rd quarter, and finished with 6 receptions for 171 yards.

At one point Malone was intercepted by Tim McKyer on two consecutive snaps (the first was wiped out by a roughing the passer penalty). Bernstine had nine catches for 80 yards - no other Charger caught more than six passes in a game all year. The 38-point defeat was the worst for San Diego since the 1973 season.

==== Week 14: at Cincinnati Bengals ====
Week Fourteen: San Diego Chargers at Cincinnati Bengals – Game summary

Quarter	1	2	3	4	Total
Chargers	3	0	7	0	**10**
Bengals	13	7	7	0	**27**

at Riverfront Stadium, Cincinnati, Ohio

- Date: December 4
- Game time: 1:00 p.m. EST
- Game weather: 37 °F (2.8 °C), relative humidity 55%, wind 13 mph, wind chill 29
- Game attendance: 56,866
- Referee: Dick Hantak
- TV announcers (NBC): Tom Hammond and Joe Namath
- Box score

Game information

**First quarter**

- SDG – Steve DeLine 26-yard field goal, 9:58. Chargers 3–0. **Drive: 8 plays, 18 yards, 5:02.**
- CIN – Ickey Woods 4-yard run (kick blocked), 7:21. Bengals 6–3. **Drive: 4 plays, 80 yards, 2:37.**
- CIN – Cris Collinsworth 23-yard pass from Boomer Esiason (Jim Breech kick), 0:03. Bengals 13–3. **Drive: 10 plays, 63 yards, 5:38.**

**Second quarter**

- CIN – Ickey Woods 30-yard run (Jim Breech kick), 2:06. Bengals 20–3. **Drive: 4 plays, 47 yards, 1:32.**

**Third quarter**

- CIN – James Brooks 2-yard pass from Boomer Esiason (Jim Breech kick), 1:39. Bengals 27–3. **Drive: 4 plays, 16 yards, 1:52.**
- SDG – Quinn Early 9-yard pass from Mark Malone (Steve DeLine kick), 0:08. Bengals 27–10. **Drive: 10 plays, 53 yards, 5:42.**

**Fourth quarter**

- No scoring plays.

**Top passers**

- SDG – Mark Malone – 14/37, 138 yards, TD, 3 INT
- CIN – Boomer Esiason – 10/19, 178 yards, 2 TD

**Top rushers**

- SDG – Tim Spencer – 10 rushes, 44 yards
- CIN – Ickey Woods – 19 rushes, 141 yards, 2 TD

**Top receivers**

- SDG – Jamie Holland – 6 receptions, 65 yards
- CIN – Rodney Holman – 3 receptions, 60 yards

For the second consecutive week, the Chargers were easily handled by an eventual Super Bowl participant. San Diego had a dream start when Patterson recovered a Stanford Jennings fumble on the opening kickoff, though they could only manage a DeLine field goal from the opening. Cincinnati responded by driving 80 yards in only four plays, with Seale committing a 37-yard pass interference penalty before Ickey Woods scored from the four. A 48-yard kickoff return by Miller was wasted when Malone threw an interception; the Bengals converted the takeaway into a Boomer Esiason touchdown pass, and took control from there. Woods scored again in the 2nd quarter, and another Malone interception led to Esiason's second touchdown pass shortly after halftime.

With the score at 27–3, Leslie O'Neal sacked Esiason, forcing a fumble that Williams recovered near midfield. The Chargers converted that opening into Early's 9-yard touchdown reception, but Deline missed a field goal on their next drive, and they came no closer.

Malone struggled throughout, completing only 14 of 37 passes, for 138 yards, one touchdown and three interceptions.

==== Week 15: vs. Pittsburgh Steelers ====
Week Fifteen: Pittsburgh Steelers at San Diego Chargers – Game summary

Quarter	1	2	3	4	Total
Steelers	0	0	0	14	**14**
Chargers	0	14	0	6	**20**

at Jack Murphy Stadium, San Diego, California

- Date: December 11
- Game time: 1:00 p.m. PST
- Game weather: 58 °F (14.4 °C), relative humidity 54%, wind 6 mph
- Game attendance: 33,816
- Referee: Fred Silva
- TV announcers (NBC): Jay Randolph and Reggie Rucker
- Box score

Game information

**First quarter**

- No scoring plays.

**Second quarter**

- SDG – Darren Flutie 6-yard pass from Mark Malone (Steve DeLine kick), 11:14. Chargers 7–0. **Drive: 7 plays, 85 yards, 3:32.**
- SDG – Mark Malone 1-yard run (Steve DeLine kick), 3:45. Chargers 14–0. **Drive: 9 plays, 59 yards, 5:19.**

**Third quarter**

- No scoring plays.

**Fourth quarter**

- SDG – Steve DeLine 24-yard field goal, 14:57. Chargers 17–0. **Drive: 9 plays, 43 yards, 4:29.**
- PIT – Preston Gothard 3-yard pass from Bubby Brister (Gary Anderson kick), 11:47. Chargers 17–7. **Drive: 7 plays, 72 yards, 3:00.**
- PIT – Bubby Brister 3-yard run (Gary Anderson kick), 8:44. Chargers 17–14. **Drive: 2 plays, 25 yards, 0:46.**
- SDG – Steve DeLine 42-yard field goal, 1:02. Chargers 20–14. **Drive: 6 plays, 19 yards, 1:41.**

**Top passers**

- PIT – Bubby Brister – 17/32, 206 yards, TD, INT
- SDG – Mark Malone – 17/24, 148 yards, TD

**Top rushers**

- PIT – Merril Hoge – 10 rushes, 49 yards
- SDG – Gary Anderson – 26 rushes, 170 yards

**Top receivers**

- PIT – Rodney Carter – 6 receptions, 72 yards
- SDG – Jamie Holland – 3 receptions, 57 yards

Gill Byrd and Gary Anderson carried San Diego to victory over the Steelers. Redden was stuffed for no gain on fourth down late in the opening quarter, but the Chargers scored touchdowns on their next two possessions. The first scoring drive covered 85 yards in just seven plays. Anderson broke off a 36-yard run up the middle, Malone found Holland for 45 yards on 3rd and 13, and Darren Flutie caught a six-yard touchdown pass. Malone was 4 of 4 for 32 yards on the next drive, and scored himself on 3rd and goal from the one. Pittsburgh drove inside the Charger 10 shortly before halftime, but a trick play backfired when wide receiver Louis Lipps attempted a pass that Byrd intercepted in the end zone.

The Steelers also breached Charger territory on their first two drives of the 3rd quarter, but were stopped by Byrd's second interception and Glenn's fumble recovery. Anderson's 24-yard carry helped set up a DeLine field goal on the opening play of the final quarter, before Pittsburgh responded with back to back touchdown drives, Bubby Brister passing for one score and rushing for the other. Another DeLine kick made it 20–14 with 62 seconds to play. Brister led his team as far as the Charger 49, from where his final pass was knocked away by Byrd as time expired.

Anderson had 26 carries for 170 yards, and San Diego committed no turnovers for the only time in 1988.

==== Week 16: vs. Kansas City Chiefs ====
Week Sixteen: Kansas City Chiefs at San Diego Chargers – Game summary

Quarter	1	2	3	4	Total
Chiefs	13	0	0	0	**13**
Chargers	10	7	7	0	**24**

at Jack Murphy Stadium, San Diego, California

- Date: December 18
- Game time: 1:00 p.m. PST
- Game weather: 54 °F (12.2 °C), relative humidity 76%, wind 7 mph
- Game attendance: 26,339
- Referee: Johnny Grier
- TV announcers (NBC): Jay Randolph and Dave Rowe
- Box score

Game information

**First quarter**

- KAN – Paul Palmer 26-yard run (Nick Lowery kick), 13:31. Chiefs 7–0. **Drive: 4 plays, 80 yards, 1:23.**
- SDG – Gary Anderson 9-yard run (Steve DeLine kick), 8:21. Tied 7–7. **Drive: 8 plays, 65 yards, 5:01.**
- KAN – Jonathan Hayes 4-yard pass from Steve DeBerg (no conversion - bad snap), 2:46. Chiefs 13–7. **Drive: 12 plays, 75 yards, 5:23.**
- SDG – Steve DeLine 45-yard field goal, 0:08. Chiefs 13–10. **Drive: 7 plays, 35 yards, 2:28.**

**Second quarter**

- SDG – Mark Malone 5-yard run (Steve DeLine kick), 3:06. Chargers 17–13. **Drive: 12 plays, 64 yards, 7:20.**

**Third quarter**

- SDG – Jamie Holland 94-yard kickoff return (Steve DeLine kick), 14:44. Chargers 24–13.

**Fourth quarter**

- No scoring plays.

**Top passers**

- KAN – Steve DeBerg – 17/36, 187 yards, TD, 2 INT
- SDG – Mark Malone – 6/10, 91 yards

**Top rushers**

- KAN – James Saxon – 15 rushes, 63 yards
- SDG – Gary Anderson – 34 rushes, 217 yards, TD

**Top receivers**

- KAN – Stephone Paige – 5 receptions, 87 yards
- SDG – Anthony Miller – 2 receptions, 33 yards

Gary Anderson set a club record for rushing yards in a single game, and San Diego closed out their season with a fourth win in six games to avoid the AFC West cellar. The Chiefs began the game on the front foot, taking the opening kickoff and going 80 yards for a touchdown in four plays, aided when Seale was flagged for a 40-yard pass interference penalty. Anderson carried on seven out of eight plays in the Chargers' reply, gaining 48 yards total and running through a massive hole off right guard for a 9-yard touchdown. Kansas City came right back with a 75-yard touchdown drive, but they would be shut out the rest of the way. San Diego scored on their next two possession through DeLine's 45-yard field goal and Malone's five-yard run, and led 17–13 at the break.

Jamie Holland produced the game's final score by returning the second half kickoff 94 yards for a touchdown, sweeping right and coming very close to stepping out of bounds near midfield (the score stood up under replay review). After that, both kickers missed field goals, Steve DeBerg was intercepted by Roy Bennett, and Malone lost a fumble. After stopping the Chiefs on downs with 1:44 to play, the Chargers took over with Anderson standing on 198 rushing yards for the day. He had carries of 17 and 2 yards before Malone kneeled twice to end the season.

Malone only attempted 10 passes all day, completing 6 for 91 yards. Anderson finished with 34 carries for 217 yards and a touchdown, setting a new club record. The attendance of 26,339 was the smallest for a Chargers home game since 1975.

=== Standings ===
AFC West
	W	L	T	PCT	DIV	CONF	PF	PA	STK
^{(3)} Seattle Seahawks	9	7	0	.563	6–2	8–4	339	329	W2
Denver Broncos	8	8	0	.500	3–5	5–7	327	352	W1
Los Angeles Raiders	7	9	0	.438	6–2	6–6	325	369	L2
San Diego Chargers	6	10	0	.375	3–5	4–8	231	332	W2
Kansas City Chiefs	4	11	1	.281	2–6	4–9–1	254	320	L2

== Awards ==
Only one Charger was named to the 1989 Pro Bowl, with Lee Williams a starter on the AFC squad; none were selected for the Associated Press All-Pro team.
