= 1988 Kansas City Chiefs season =

NFL team season

- Owner: Lamar Hunt
- General manager: Jim Schaaf (fired Dec. 8); Carl Peterson (after Dec. 19)
- Head coach: Frank Gansz
- Home stadium: Arrowhead Stadium

Results
- Record: 4–11–1
- Division place: 5th AFC West
- Playoffs: Did not qualify
- All-Pros: 1: S Deron Cherry (1st team)
- Pro Bowlers: 3: LB Dino Hackett; CB Albert Lewis; S Deron Cherry

The 1988 Kansas City Chiefs season was the franchise's 19th season in the National Football League and the 29th overall.

Bill Kenney opened the team's initial two games at quarterback, but was replaced by Steve DeBerg for the second half against Seattle. DeBerg guided the team to a 20–13 win against Denver in his initial start as a member of the Chiefs. However, six losses, and a tie followed as Kenney and DeBerg jostled for the starting job.

As the season drew to a close, it became apparent the winds of change were blowing across the organization. President Jack Steadman resigned on December 8, while general manager Jim Schaaf was relieved of his duties the same day. Steadman was later named chairman of the board. On the field, the Chiefs finished the year at 4–11–1 as questions swirled regarding head coach Frank Gansz's future and who would fill the club's leadership void. One day after the season's conclusion, former Philadelphia Eagles and United States Football League executive Carl Peterson was named the club's president/general manager and chief operating officer on December 19.

== Offseason ==
The spring was marked by several notable trades as the club jockeyed to improve on its 4–11 finish in 1987. Todd Blackledge was traded to Pittsburgh on March 29 and 12-year veteran quarterback Steve DeBerg was acquired from Tampa Bay on March 31. The Chiefs moved up one spot in the first round of the draft to select defensive end Neil Smith with the second overall pick.

=== NFL draft ===
1988 Kansas City Chiefs draft
Round	Pick	Player	Position	College	Notes
1	2	Neil Smith *	Defensive end	Nebraska	
3	59	Kevin Porter	Safety	Auburn	
4	96	Johnny Ray Ambrose	Wide receiver	Mississippi	
6	139	James Saxon	Running back	San Jose State	
7	170	Troy Stedman	Linebacker	Washburn	
8	197	Alfredo Roberts	Tight end	Miami (FL)	
9	224	Azizuddin Abdur-Ra'oof	Wide receiver	Maryland	
10	251	Kenny Gamble	Running back	Colgate	
11	282	Danny McManus	Quarterback	Florida State	
Made roster * Made at least one Pro Bowl during career

== Personnel ==
=== Staff / Coaches ===
1988 Kansas City Chiefs staff
Front office: Founder – Lamar Hunt; President – Jack Steadman; Vice-president and general manager – Jim Schaaf; Director of player personnel – Whitey Dovell; Head coaches: Head coach – Frank Gansz; Offensive coaches: Offensive coordinator – George Sefcik; Running backs – Billie Matthews; Wide receivers – Dick Wood; Tight ends – JD Helm; Offensive line – Carl Mauck	Defensive coaches: Defensive coordinator – Rod Rust; Defensive line – Don Lawrence; Linebackers – Dave Brazil; Defensive backs – Tom Bettis; Special teams coaches: Special teams – Ed Beckman; Strength and conditioning: Strength and conditioning – CT Hewgley

=== Roster ===
1988 Kansas City Chiefs roster
Quarterbacks (QB): 17 Steve DeBerg; 9 Bill Kenney; 14 Danny McManus; Running backs (RB): 44 Herman Heard; 32 Larry Moriarty; 26 Paul Palmer; 21 James Saxon; Wide receivers (WR): 88 Carlos Carson; 86 Emile Harry; 83 Stephone Paige; 82 Kitrick Taylor; Tight ends (TE): 85 Jonathan Hayes; 80 Rod Jones; 87 Alfredo Roberts	Offensive linemen (OL): 61 Mark Adickes G; 76 John Alt T; 77 Rich Baldinger G; 65 Curt DiGiacomo G; 75 Irv Eatman T; 64 Gerry Feehery C; 60 Byron Ingram G; 51 Adam Lingner; 72 Dave Lutz G; Defensive linemen (DL): 99 Mike Bell DE; 98 Leonard Griffin DE; 93 Dee Hardison NT; 70 Jerome Sally NT; 90 Neil Smith DE; 71 Don Thorp DE	Linebackers (LB): 54 Tim Cofield OLB; 55 Louis Cooper OLB; 57 Chris Martin OLB; 92 Jerry McCabe ILB; 96 Aaron Pearson ILB; 52 Angelo Snipes OLB; 94 Troy Stedman OLB; Defensive backs (DB): 34 Lloyd Burruss SS; 20 Deron Cherry FS; 48 Kenny Gamble FS; 23 Greg Hill CB; 45 Sidney Johnson CB; 29 Albert Lewis CB; 24 J. C. Pearson CB; 27 Kevin Porter SS; 31 Kevin Ross CB; Special teams (ST): 2 Kelly Goodburn P; 8 Nick Lowery K	Practice squad none Reserve: -- Azizuddin Abdur-Ra'oof WR (IR); 91 Gary Baldinger DE (IR); 58 Tom Baugh C (IR); 81 Darrell Colbert WR (IR); 50 Jack Del Rio LB (IR); 56 Dino Hackett LB (IR); 59 Andy Hawkins LB (IR); -- Stephen Hobbs WR (IR); 53 Todd Howard LB (IR); 73 Brian Jozwiak G (IR); 74 Pete Koch DE (PUP); 63 Bill Maas NT (IR); 35 Christian Okoye FB (IR); 67 Mike Stensrud DE (IR); -- Richard Van Druten T; 47 active, 15 inactive Rookies in italics

== Preseason ==
Week	Date	Opponent	Result	Record	Venue	Attendance	Recap
1	August 6	Cincinnati Bengals	W 34–21	1–0	Arrowhead Stadium	31,947	Recap
2	August 13	at Atlanta Falcons	W 27–13	2–0	Atlanta–Fulton County Stadium	23,369	Recap
3	August 19	at Green Bay Packers	T 21–21 (OT)	2–0–1	Milwaukee County Stadium	32,361	Recap
4	August 25	Phoenix Cardinals	L 21–41	2–1–1	Arrowhead Stadium	36,883	Recap

== Regular season ==
=== Schedule ===
Week	Date	Opponent	Result	Record	Venue	Attendance	Recap
1	September 4	Cleveland Browns	**L** 3–6	0–1	Arrowhead Stadium	55,654	Recap
2	September 11	at **Seattle Seahawks**	**L** 10–31	0–2	Kingdome	61,512	Recap
3	September 18	**Denver Broncos**	**W** 20–13	1–2	Arrowhead Stadium	63,268	Recap
4	September 25	**San Diego Chargers**	**L** 23–24	1–3	Arrowhead Stadium	45,498	Recap
5	October 2	at New York Jets	**T** 17–17 (OT)	1–3–1	Giants Stadium	66,110	Recap
6	October 9	at Houston Oilers	**L** 6–7	1–4–1	Houston Astrodome	39,134	Recap
7	October 16	**Los Angeles Raiders**	**L** 17–27	1–5–1	Arrowhead Stadium	77,078	Recap
8	October 23	Detroit Lions	**L** 6–7	1–6–1	Arrowhead Stadium	66,926	Recap
9	October 30	at **Los Angeles Raiders**	**L** 10–17	1–7–1	Los Angeles Memorial Coliseum	36,103	Recap
10	November 6	at **Denver Broncos**	**L** 11–17	1–8–1	Mile High Stadium	74,227	Recap
11	November 13	Cincinnati Bengals	**W** 31–28	2–8–1	Arrowhead Stadium	34,614	Recap
12	November 20	**Seattle Seahawks**	**W** 27–24	3–8–1	Arrowhead Stadium	33,152	Recap
13	November 27	at Pittsburgh Steelers	**L** 10–16	3–9–1	Three Rivers Stadium	42,057	Recap
14	December 4	New York Jets	**W** 38–34	4–9–1	Arrowhead Stadium	30,059	Recap
15	December 11	at New York Giants	**L** 12–28	4–10–1	Giants Stadium	69,807	Recap
16	December 18	at **San Diego Chargers**	**L** 13–24	4–11–1	Jack Murphy Stadium	26,339	Recap
Note: Intra-division opponents are in **bold** text.

=== Game summaries ===
==== Week 1: vs. Cleveland Browns ====
Week 1: Cleveland Browns at Kansas City Chiefs – Game summary

Quarter	1	2	3	4	Total
**Browns**	0	3	0	3	**6**
Chiefs	0	3	0	0	**3**

at Arrowhead Stadium, Kansas City, Missouri

- Date: September 4
- Game time: 3:00 p.m. CDT
- Game weather: Mostly Cloudy, 77 °F (25 °C)
- Game attendance: 55,654
- Referee: Jim Tunney
- TV announcers (NBC): Gary Gerould and Reggie Rucker
- Recap, Game Book

Game information

**First quarter**

- No scoring plays.

**Second quarter**

- KC – Nick Lowery 33-yard field goal, 3:11. Chiefs 3–0. **Drive: 6 plays, 27 yards, 3:10.**
- CLE – Matt Bahr 19-yard field goal, 0:00. Tied 3–3. **Drive: 12 plays, 81 yards, 2:59.**

**Third quarter**

- No scoring plays.

**Fourth quarter**

- CLE – Matt Bahr 38-yard field goal, 0:25. Browns 6–3. **Drive: 13 plays, 72 yards, 5:54.**

**Top passers**

- CLE – Gary Danielson – 18/29, 170 yards, INT
- KC – Bill Kenney – 11/29, 106 yards, 2 INT

**Top rushers**

- CLE – Tim Manoa – 14 rushes, 70 yards
- KC – Paul Palmer – 12 rushes, 28 yards

**Top receivers**

- CLE – Webster Slaughter – 5 receptions, 61 yards
- KC – Alfredo Roberts – 3 receptions, 34 yards

==== Week 2: at Seattle Seahawks ====
Week 2: Kansas City Chiefs at Seattle Seahawks – Game summary

Quarter	1	2	3	4	Total
Chiefs	3	0	0	7	**10**
**Seahawks**	3	28	0	0	**31**

at Kingdome, Seattle, Washington

- Date: September 11
- Game time: 3:00 p.m. CDT/1:00 p.m. PDT
- Game weather: None (indoor stadium)
- Game attendance: 61,512
- Referee: Jerry Markbreit
- TV announcers (NBC): Sam Nover and Jon Morris
- Recap, Game Book

Game information

**First quarter**

- SEA – Norm Johnson 18-yard field goal, 6:44. Seahawks 3–0. **Drive: 9 plays, 47 yards, 5:49.**
- KC – Nick Lowery 27-yard field goal, 1:11. Tied 3–3. **Drive: 7 plays, 14 yards, 2:53.**

**Second quarter**

- SEA – Curt Warner 1-yard run (Norm Johnson kick), 9:37. Seahawks 10–3. **Drive: 12 plays, 59 yards, 6:24.**
- SEA – Curt Warner 3-yard run (Norm Johnson kick), 2:26. Seahawks 17–3. **Drive: 10 plays, 53 yards, 5:43.**
- SEA – Brian Blades 17-yard pass from Dave Krieg (Norm Johnson kick), 0:51. Seahawks 24–3. **Drive: 4 plays, 18 yards, 0:57.**
- SEA – Jacob Green fumble recovery in end zone (Norm Johnson kick), 0:37. Seahawks 31–3.

**Third quarter**

- No scoring plays.

**Fourth quarter**

- KC – Stephone Paige 15-yard pass from Steve DeBerg (Nick Lowery kick), 13:51. Seahawks 31–10. **Drive: 12 plays, 72 yards, 4:20.**

**Top passers**

- KC – Steve DeBerg – 22/38, 244 yards, TD, 3 INT
- SEA – Dave Krieg – 14/22, 114 yards, TD

**Top rushers**

- KC – Paul Palmer – 14 rushes, 44 yards
- SEA – Curt Warner – 20 rushes, 72 yards, 2 TD

**Top receivers**

- KC – Paul Palmer – 8 receptions, 105 yards
- SEA – Brian Blades – 3 receptions, 39 yards, TD

==== Week 3: vs. Denver Broncos ====
Week 3: Denver Broncos at Kansas City Chiefs – Game summary

Quarter	1	2	3	4	Total
Broncos	3	7	0	3	**13**
**Chiefs**	3	7	7	3	**20**

at Arrowhead Stadium, Kansas City, Missouri

- Date: September 18
- Game time: 12:00 p.m. CDT
- Game weather: Cloudy and Rain, 73 °F (23 °C)
- Game attendance: 63,268
- Referee: Jerry Seeman
- TV announcers (NBC): Jim Donovan and Joe Namath
- Recap, Game Book

Game information

**First quarter**

- KC – Nick Lowery 50-yard field goal, 9:40. Chiefs 3–0. **Drive: 4 plays, 2 yards, 0:55.**
- DEN – Rich Karlis 23-yard field goal, 0:57. Tied 3–3. **Drive: 11 plays, 46 yards, 5:05.**

**Second quarter**

- KC – Carlos Carson 6-yard pass from Steve DeBerg (Nick Lowery kick), 8:21. Chiefs 10–3. **Drive: 8 plays, 58 yards, 3:13.**
- DEN – Tony Dorsett 8-yard run (Rich Karlis kick), 2:52. Tied 10–10. **Drive: 9 plays, 75 yards, 5:20.**

**Third quarter**

- KC – Paul Palmer 14-yard pass from Steve DeBerg (Nick Lowery kick), 6:04. Chiefs 17–10. **Drive: 14 plays, 77 yards, 8:56.**

**Fourth quarter**

- DEN – Rich Karlis 42-yard field goal, 9:34. Chiefs 17–13. **Drive: 10 plays, 57 yards, 3:03.**
- KC – Nick Lowery 29-yard field goal, 3:47. Chiefs 20–13. **Drive: 11 plays, 64 yards, 5:38.**

**Top passers**

- DEN – John Elway – 15/32, 213 yards, 2 INT
- KC – Steve DeBerg – 21/35, 259 yards, 2 TD

**Top rushers**

- DEN – Tony Dorsett – 10 rushes, 35 yards, TD
- KC – Paul Palmer – 22 rushes, 80 yards

**Top receivers**

- DEN – Orson Mobley – 4 receptions, 59 yards
- KC – Paul Palmer – 7 receptions, 84 yards, TD

==== Week 4: vs. San Diego Chargers ====
Week 4: San Diego Chargers at Kansas City Chiefs – Game summary

Quarter	1	2	3	4	Total
**Chargers**	14	0	0	10	**24**
Chiefs	0	14	9	0	**23**

at Arrowhead Stadium, Kansas City, Missouri

- Date: September 25
- Game time: 3:00 p.m. CDT
- Game weather: Sunny, 78 °F (26 °C)
- Game attendance: 45,498
- Referee: Pat Haggerty
- TV announcers (NBC): Ray Scott and Merlin Olsen
- Recap, Game Book

Game information

**First quarter**

- SD – Quinn Early 38-yard pass from Babe Laufenberg (Vince Abbott kick), 5:11. Chargers 7–0. **Drive: 9 plays, 75 yards, 5:20.**
- SD – Gary Anderson 30-yard run (Vince Abbott kick), 1:08. Chargers 14–0. **Drive: 6 plays, 60 yards, 1:45.**

**Second quarter**

- KC – Paul Palmer 71-yard pass from Steve DeBerg (Nick Lowery kick), 14:49. Chargers 14–7. **Drive: 3 plays, 80 yards, 1:19.**
- KC – Stephone Paige 2-yard pass from Steve DeBerg (Nick Lowery kick), 0:18. Tied 14–14. **Drive: 8 plays, 58 yards, 1:07.**

**Third quarter**

- KC – Paul Palmer 6-yard pass from Steve DeBerg (Nick Lowery kick), 5:08. Chiefs 21–14. **Drive: 13 plays, 80 yards, 5:13.**
- KC – Babe Laufenberg sacked in end zone by Bill Maas for a Safety, 3:35. Chiefs 23–14.

**Fourth quarter**

- SD – Vince Abbott 47-yard field goal, 8:13. Chiefs 23–17. **Drive: 6 plays, 37 yards, 2:19.**
- SD – Lionel James 9-yard pass from Babe Laufenberg (Vince Abbott kick), 0:52. Chargers 24–23. **Drive: 13 plays, 61 yards, 5:50.**

**Top passers**

- SD – Babe Laufenberg – 13/25, 167 yards, 2 TD, INT
- KC – Steve DeBerg – 20/38, 261 yards, 2 TD, INT

**Top rushers**

- SD – Gary Anderson – 23 rushes, 131 yards, TD
- KC – Paul Palmer – 17 rushes, 76 yards

**Top receivers**

- SD – Quinn Early – 3 receptions, 63 yards, TD
- KC – Paul Palmer – 5 receptions, 122 yards, 2 TD

==== Week 5: at New York Jets ====
Week 5: Kansas City Chiefs at New York Jets – Game summary

Quarter	1	2	3	4	OT	Total
Chiefs	0	0	3	14	0	**17**
Jets	3	7	0	7	0	**17**

at Giants Stadium, East Rutherford, New Jersey

- Date: October 2
- Game time: 4:00 p.m. EDT/3:00 p.m. CDT
- Game weather: Cloudy, 78 °F (26 °C)
- Game attendance: 66,110
- Referee: Ben Dreith
- TV announcers (NBC): Merle Harmon and Al DeRogatis
- Recap, Game Book

Game information

**First quarter**

- NYJ – Pat Leahy 23-yard field goal, 4:34. Jets 3–0. **Drive: 11 plays, 74 yards, 4:45.**

**Second quarter**

- NYJ – Johnny Hector 4-yard run (Pat Leahy kick), 9:00. Jets 10–0. **Drive: 8 plays, 60 yards, 3:52.**

**Third quarter**

- KC – Nick Lowery 34-yard field goal, 8:07. Jets 10–3. **Drive: 8 plays, 57 yards, 3:49.**

**Fourth quarter**

- NYJ – Johnny Hector 1-yard run (Pat Leahy kick), 14:56. Jets 17–3. **Drive: 5 plays, 31 yards, 1:56.**
- KC – Carlos Carson 80-yard pass from Steve DeBerg (Nick Lowery kick), 14:32. Jets 17–10. **Drive: 1 play, 80 yards, 0:20.**
- KC – Emile Harry 8-yard pass from Steve DeBerg (Nick Lowery kick), 0:51. Tied 17–17. **Drive: 13 plays, 80 yards, 3:10.**

**Overtime**

- No scoring plays.

**Top passers**

- KC – Steve DeBerg – 17/34, 312 yards, 2 TD, 2 INT
- NYJ – Ken O'Brien – 27/48, 288 yards, INT

**Top rushers**

- KC – Christian Okoye – 12 rushes, 51 yards
- NYJ – Freeman McNeil – 22 rushes, 154 yards

**Top receivers**

- KC – Carlos Carson – 5 receptions, 162 yards, TD
- NYJ – Mickey Shuler – 12 receptions, 152 yards

==== Week 6: at Houston Oilers ====
Week 6: Kansas City Chiefs at Houston Oilers – Game summary

Quarter	1	2	3	4	Total
Chiefs	3	3	0	0	**6**
**Oilers**	0	0	7	0	**7**

at Astrodome, Houston, Texas

- Date: October 9
- Game time: 12:00 p.m. CDT
- Game weather: None (indoor stadium)
- Game attendance: 39,134
- Referee: Fred Silva
- TV announcers (NBC): Jay Randolph and Reggie Rucker
- Recap, Game Book

Game information

**First quarter**

- KC – Nick Lowery 28-yard field goal, 1:34. Chiefs 3–0. **Drive: 10 plays, 70 yards, 4:59.**

**Second quarter**

- KC – Nick Lowery 51-yard field goal, 6:41. Chiefs 6–0. **Drive: 7 plays, 39 yards, 4:37.**

**Third quarter**

- HOU – Brent Pease 4-yard run (Tony Zendejas kick), 2:42. Oilers 7–6. **Drive: 9 plays, 63 yards, 4:05.**

**Fourth quarter**

- No scoring plays.

**Top passers**

- KC – Steve DeBerg – 15/30, 163 yards, 2 INT
- HOU – Brent Pease – 3/14, 26 yards, 3 INT

**Top rushers**

- KC – Herman Heard – 7 rushes, 46 yards
- HOU – Mike Rozier – 27 rushes, 141 yards

**Top receivers**

- KC – Carlos Carson – 3 receptions, 54 yards
- HOU – Alonzo Highsmith – 1 reception, 9 yards

==== Week 7: vs. Los Angeles Raiders ====
Week 7: Los Angeles Raiders at Kansas City Chiefs – Game summary

Quarter	1	2	3	4	Total
**Raiders**	7	7	0	13	**27**
Chiefs	0	7	0	10	**17**

at Arrowhead Stadium, Kansas City, Missouri

- Date: October 16
- Game time: 12:00 p.m. CDT
- Game weather: Sunny, 67 °F (19 °C)
- Game attendance: 77,078
- Referee: Bob McElwee
- TV announcers (NBC): Tom Hammond and Joe Namath
- Recap, Game Book

Game information

**First quarter**

- RAI – Marcus Allen 1-yard run (Chris Bahr kick), 2:52. Raiders 7–0. **Drive: 8 plays, 27 yards, 4:19.**

**Second quarter**

- RAI – Steve Smith 1-yard run (Chris Bahr kick), 10:10. Raiders 14–0. **Drive: 12 plays, 45 yards, 6:09.**
- KC – Paul Palmer 48-yard pass from Steve DeBerg (Nick Lowery kick), 8:35. Raiders 14–7. **Drive: 4 plays, 73 yards, 1:25.**

**Third quarter**

- No scoring plays.

**Fourth quarter**

- KC – Nick Lowery 43-yard field goal, 14:56. Raiders 14–10. **Drive: 7 plays, 14 yards, 2:47.**
- RAI – Trey Junkin 4-yard pass from Steve Beuerlein (kick blocked), 10:55. Raiders 20–10. **Drive: 3 plays, 11 yards, 0:52.**
- RAI – Bo Jackson 1-yard run (Chris Bahr kick), 5:49. Raiders 27–10. **Drive: 7 plays, 60 yards, 3:20.**
- KC – Stephone Paige 25-yard pass from Steve DeBerg (Nick Lowery kick), 1:22. Raiders 27–17. **Drive: 5 plays, 69 yards, 0:53.**

**Top passers**

- RAI – Steve Beuerlein – 4/7, 70 yards, TD
- KC – Steve DeBerg – 16/30, 269 yards, 2 TD, 2 INT

**Top rushers**

- RAI – Bo Jackson – 21 rushes, 70 yards, TD
- KC – Christian Okoye – 10 rushes, 55 yards

**Top receivers**

- RAI – Mervyn Fernandez – 2 receptions, 48 yards
- KC – Paul Palmer – 5 receptions, 103 yards, TD

==== Week 8: vs. Detroit Lions ====
Week 8: Detroit Lions at Kansas City Chiefs – Game summary

Quarter	1	2	3	4	Total
**Lions**	0	7	0	0	**7**
Chiefs	0	3	3	0	**6**

at Arrowhead Stadium, Kansas City, Missouri

- Date: October 23
- Game time: 12:00 p.m. CDT
- Game weather: Clear and Sunny, 58 °F (14 °C)
- Game attendance: 66,926
- Referee: Tom Dooley
- TV announcers (CBS): Greg Gumbel and Ken Stabler
- Recap, Game Book

Game information

**First quarter**

- No scoring plays.

**Second quarter**

- KC – Nick Lowery 38-yard field goal, 11:12. Chiefs 3–0. **Drive: 11 plays, 60 yards, 5:32.**
- DET – Jeff Chadwick 14-yard pass from Rusty Hilger (Eddie Murray kick), 2:31. Lions 7–3. **Drive: 6 plays, 47 yards, 4:25.**

**Third quarter**

- KC – Nick Lowery 43-yard field goal, 13:14. Lions 7–6. **Drive: 4 plays, 7 yards, 1:17.**

**Fourth quarter**

- No scoring plays.

**Top passers**

- DET – Rusty Hilger – 8/18, 111 yards, TD, 2 INT
- KC – Bill Kenney – 17/29, 154 yards, INT

**Top rushers**

- DET – Tony Paige – 12 rushes, 47 yards
- KC – Christian Okoye – 9 rushes, 33 yards

**Top receivers**

- DET – Jeff Chadwick – 2 receptions, 32 yards, TD
- KC – Stephone Paige – 5 receptions, 63 yards

==== Week 9: at Los Angeles Raiders ====
Week 9: Kansas City Chiefs at Los Angeles Raiders – Game summary

Quarter	1	2	3	4	Total
Chiefs	0	7	0	3	**10**
**Raiders**	7	7	0	3	**17**

at Los Angeles Memorial Coliseum, Los Angeles, California

- Date: October 30
- Game time: 3:00 p.m. CST/1:00 p.m. PST
- Game weather: Clear, 70 °F (21 °C)
- Game attendance: 36,103
- Referee: Johnny Grier
- TV announcers (NBC): Don Criqui and Bob Trumpy
- Recap, Game Book

Game information

**First quarter**

- RAI – Bo Jackson 22-yard run (Chris Bahr kick), 7:30. Raiders 7–0. **Drive: 11 plays, 78 yards, 6:21.**

**Second quarter**

- KC – Paul Palmer 3-yard run (Nick Lowery kick), 5:41. Tied 7–7. **Drive: 15 plays, 74 yards, 9:13.**
- RAI – Marcus Allen 1-yard run (Chris Bahr kick), 1:23. Raiders 14–7. **Drive: 11 plays, 67 yards, 4:18.**

**Third quarter**

- No scoring plays.

**Fourth quarter**

- RAI – Chris Bhar 42-yard field goal, 14:24. Raiders 17–7. **Drive: 11 plays, 69 yards, 5:32.**
- KC – Nick Lowery 45-yard field goal, 3:13. Raiders 17–10. **Drive: 13 plays, 53 yards, 4:09.**

**Top passers**

- KC – Bill Kenney – 7/14, 47 yards
- RAI – Steve Beuerlein – 18/29, 248 yards, INT

**Top rushers**

- KC – Paul Palmer – 14 rushes, 56 yards
- RAI – Bo Jackson – 17 rushes, 80 yards, TD

**Top receivers**

- KC – Stephone Paige – 3 receptions, 27 yards,
- RAI – Tim Brown – 8 receptions, 95 yards

==== Week 10: at Denver Broncos ====
Week 10: Kansas City Chiefs at Denver Broncos – Game summary

Quarter	1	2	3	4	Total
Chiefs	2	3	3	3	**11**
**Broncos**	0	14	0	3	**17**

at Mile High Stadium, Denver, Colorado

- Date: November 6
- Game time: 3:00 p.m. CST/2:00 p.m. MST
- Game weather: Partly Cloudy, 63 °F (17 °C)
- Game attendance: 74,227
- Referee: Gordon McCarter
- TV announcers (NBC): Gary Gerould and Reggie Rucker
- Recap, Game Book

Game information

**First quarter**

- KC – Tony Dorsett tackled in end zone by Dino Hackett for a Safety, 8:13. Chiefs 2–0.

**Second quarter**

- DEN – Vance Johnson 6-yard pass from John Elway (Rich Karlis kick), 14:55. Broncos 7–2. **Drive: 12 plays, 71 yards, 6:27.**
- DEN – Sammy Winder 1-yard run (Rich Karlis kick), 1:57. Broncos 14–2. **Drive: 3 plays, 21 yards, 0:30.**
- KC – Nick Lowery 46-yard field goal, 0:26. Broncos 14–5. **Drive: 9 plays, 54 yards, 1:31.**

**Third quarter**

- KC – Nick Lowery 29-yard field goal, 2:29. Broncos 14–8. **Drive: 7 plays, 32 yards, 3:03.**

**Fourth quarter**

- DEN – Rich Karlis 42-yard field goal, 13:58. Broncos 17–8. **Drive: 11 plays, 55 yards, 3:31.**
- KC – Nick Lowery 34-yard field goal, 8:50. Broncos 17–11. **Drive: 10 plays, 64 yards, 5:08.**

**Top passers**

- KC – Bill Kenney – 16/27, 193 yards, INT
- DEN – John Elway – 14/28, 183 yards, TD, 2 INT

**Top rushers**

- KC – Herman Heard – 8 rushes, 27 yards
- DEN – Tony Dorsett – 10 rushes, 44 yards

**Top receivers**

- KC – Carlos Carson – 4 receptions, 51 yards
- DEN – Vance Johnson – 6 receptions, 72 yards, TD

==== Week 11: vs. Cincinnati Bengals ====
Week 11: Cincinnati Bengals at Kansas City Chiefs – Game summary

Quarter	1	2	3	4	Total
Bengals	7	7	14	0	**28**
**Chiefs**	6	3	10	12	**31**

at Arrowhead Stadium, Kansas City, Missouri

- Date: November 13
- Game time: 12:00 p.m. CST
- Game weather: Sunny, 59 °F (15 °C)
- Game attendance: 34,614
- Referee: Jerry Seeman
- TV announcers (NBC): Don Criqui and Bob Trumpy
- Recap

Game information

**First quarter**

- KC – Nick Lowery 37-yard field goal, 10:00. Chiefs 3–0. **Drive: 9 plays, 61 yards, 5:00.**
- CIN – Ickey Woods 4-yard run (Jim Breech kick), 6:25. Bengals 7–3. **Drive: 10 plays, 74 yards, 3:35.**
- KC – Nick Lowery 35-yard field goal, 1:19. Bengals 7–6. **Drive: 9 plays, 63 yards, 5:06.**

**Second quarter**

- KC – Nick Lowery 23-yard field goal, 1:57. Chiefs 9–7. **Drive: 23 plays, 87 yards, 12:15.**
- CIN – Stanley Wilson 5-yard run (Jim Breech kick), 0:14. Bengals 14–9. **Drive: 9 plays, 71 yards, 1:43.**

**Third quarter**

- CIN – Boomer Esiason 5-yard run (Jim Breech kick), 7:14. Bengals 21–9. **Drive: 7 plays, 51 yards, 3:57.**
- KC – Stephone Paige 17-yard pass from Steve DeBerg (Nick Lowery kick), 5:19. Bengals 21–16. **Drive: 5 plays, 82 yards, 1:55.**
- CIN – Stanford Jennings 98-yard kickoff return (Jim Breech kick), 5:01. Bengals 28–16.
- KC – Nick Lowery 47-yard field goal, 1:16. Bengals 28–19. **Drive: 8 plays, 54 yards, 3:45.**

**Fourth quarter**

- KC – Punt blocked by Albert Lewis out of bounds in end zone for a Safety, 6:06. Bengals 28–21.
- KC – Christian Okoye 1-yard run (Nick Lowery kick), 1:16. Tied 28–28. **Drive: 12 plays, 64 yards, 4:50.**
- KC – Nick Lowery 39-yard field goal, 0:02. Chiefs 31–28. **Drive: 4 plays, 6 yards, 1:03.**

**Top passers**

- CIN – Boomer Esiason – 11/22, 157 yards, INT
- KC – Steve DeBerg – 22/37, 285 yards, TD

**Top rushers**

- CIN – Ickey Woods – 13 rushes, 76 yards, TD
- KC – Christian Okoye – 16 rushes, 102 yards, TD

**Top receivers**

- CIN – Tim McGee – 3 receptions, 60 yards
- KC – Carlos Carson – 7 receptions, 86 yards

==== Week 12: vs. Seattle Seahawks ====
Week 12: Seattle Seahawks at Kansas City Chiefs – Game summary

Quarter	1	2	3	4	Total
Seahawks	0	7	7	10	**24**
**Chiefs**	7	7	3	10	**27**

at Arrowhead Stadium, Kansas City, Missouri

- Date: November 20
- Game time: 12:00 p.m. CST
- Game weather: Sunny, 34 °F (1 °C)
- Game attendance: 33,152
- Referee: Bob McElwee
- TV announcers (NBC): Gary Gerould and Jimmy Cefalo
- Recap, Game Book

Game information

**First quarter**

- KC – James Saxon 2-yard run (Nick Lowery kick), 1:54. Chiefs 7–0. **Drive: 15 plays, 81 yards, 9:10.**

**Second quarter**

- KC – Christian Okoye 2-yard run (Nick Lowery kick), 4:24. Chiefs 14–0. **Drive: 2 plays, 51 yards, 0:13.**
- SEA – Ray Butler 12-yard pass from Dave Krieg (Norm Johnson kick), 1:01. Chiefs 14–7. **Drive: 10 plays, 75 yards, 3:15.**

**Third quarter**

- SEA – Terry Taylor 27-yard interception return (Norm Johnson kick), 14:04. Tied 14–14.
- KC – Nick Lowery 34-yard field goal, 2:18. Chiefs 17–14. **Drive: 10 plays, 44 yards, 4:57.**

**Fourth quarter**

- KC – Steve DeBerg 1-yard run (Nick Lowery kick), 14:38. Chiefs 24–14. **Drive: 4 plays, 19 yards, 0:40.**
- SEA – Norm Johnson 32-yard field goal, 10:13. Chiefs 24–17. **Drive: 9 plays, 60 yards, 4:47.**
- SEA – Brian Blades 14-yard pass from Dave Krieg (Norm Johnson kick), 4:20. Tied 24–24. **Drive: 7 plays, 59 yards, 3:09.**
- KC – Nick Lowery 40-yard field goal, 0:46. Chiefs 27–24. **Drive: 13 plays, 51 yards, 3:24.**

**Top passers**

- SEA – Dave Krieg – 20/30, 225 yards, 2 TD, INT
- KC – Steve DeBerg – 16/26, 203 yards, 2 INT

**Top rushers**

- SEA – John Williams – 11 rushes, 50 yards
- KC – Herman Heard – 16 rushes, 84 yards

**Top receivers**

- SEA – Brian Blades – 7 receptions, 89 yards, TD
- KC – Stephone Paige – 5 receptions, 106 yards

==== Week 13: at Pittsburgh Steelers ====
Week 13: Kansas City Chiefs at Pittsburgh Steelers – Game summary

Quarter	1	2	3	4	Total
Chiefs	0	7	0	3	**10**
**Steelers**	6	7	3	0	**16**

at Three Rivers Stadium, Pittsburgh, Pennsylvania

- Date: November 27
- Game time: 1:00 p.m. EST/12:00 p.m. CST
- Game weather: Partly Cloudy, 51 °F (11 °C)
- Game attendance: 42,057
- Referee: Dick Jorgensen
- TV announcers (NBC): Gary Gerould and Reggie Rucker
- Recap, Game Book

Game information

**First quarter**

- PIT – Gary Anderson 23-yard field goal, 7:05. Steelers 3–0. **Drive: 19 plays, 74 yards, 7:55.**
- PIT – Gary Anderson 20-yard field goal, 0:12. Steelers 6–0. **Drive: 10 plays, 64 yards, 4:01.**

**Second quarter**

- KC – Stephone Paige 4-yard pass from Steve DeBerg (Nick Lowery kick), 8:15. Chiefs 7–6. **Drive: 14 plays, 74 yards, 6:54.**
- PIT – Merril Hoge 10-yard run (Gary Anderson kick), 1:06. Steelers 13–7. **Drive: 9 plays, 62 yards, 4:01.**

**Third quarter**

- PIT – Gary Anderson 22-yard field goal, 0:21. Steelers 16–7. **Drive: 13 plays, 75 yards, 6:18.**

**Fourth quarter**

- KC – Nick Lowery 26-yard field goal, 6:34. Steelers 16–10. **Drive: 9 plays, 66 yards, 3:22.**

**Top passers**

- KC – Steve DeBerg – 23/42, 278 yards, TD, INT
- PIT – Bubby Brister – 13/27, 122 yards, INT

**Top rushers**

- KC – Christian Okoye – 9 rushes, 58 yards
- PIT – Merril Hoge – 15 rushes, 76 yards, TD

**Top receivers**

- KC – Herman Heard – 7 receptions, 99 yards
- PIT – Charles Lockett – 4 receptions, 60 yards

==== Week 14: vs. New York Jets ====
Week 14: New York Jets at Kansas City Chiefs – Game summary

Quarter	1	2	3	4	Total
Jets	10	10	7	7	**34**
**Chiefs**	14	7	0	17	**38**

at Arrowhead Stadium, Kansas City, Missouri

- Date: December 4
- Game time: 3:00 p.m. CST
- Game weather: Sunny, 44 °F (7 °C)
- Game attendance: 30,059
- Referee: Fred Wyant
- TV announcers (NBC): Marv Albert and Paul Maguire
- Recap, Game Book

Game information

**First quarter**

- KC – Carlos Carson 40-yard pass from Steve DeBerg (Nick Lowery kick), 12:17. Chiefs 7–0. **Drive: 7 plays, 80 yards, 2:43.**
- KC – Stephone Paige 41-yard pass from Steve DeBerg (Nick Lowery kick), 4:03. Chiefs 14–0. **Drive: 6 plays, 49 yards, 4:22.**
- NYJ – Mickey Shuler 40-yard pass from Pat Ryan (Pat Leahy kick), 1:33. Chiefs 14–7. **Drive: 6 plays, 67 yards, 2:19.**
- NYJ – Pat Leahy 33-yard field goal, 0:27. Chiefs 14–10. **Drive: 4 plays, 5 yards, 1:07.**

**Second quarter**

- KC – Stephone Paige 33-yard pass from Steve DeBerg (Nick Lowery kick), 4:58. Chiefs 21–10. **Drive: 1 play, 33 yards, 0:06.**
- NYJ – Al Toon 2-yard pass from Pat Ryan (Pat Leahy kick), 1:53. Chiefs 21–17. **Drive: 8 plays, 64 yards, 2:54.**
- NYJ – Pat Leahy 32-yard field goal, 0:06. Chiefs 21–20. **Drive: 8 plays, 24 yards, 1:08.**

**Third quarter**

- NYJ – Johnny Hector 6-yard run (Pat Leahy kick), 5:58. Jets 27–21. **Drive: 8 plays, 82 yards, 3:45.**

**Fourth quarter**

- KC – Nick Lowery 21-yard field goal, 14:38. Jets 27–24. **Drive: 12 plays, 70 yards, 6:12.**
- NYJ – Johnny Hector 1-yard run (Pat Leahy kick), 8:12. Jets 34–24. **Drive: 11 plays, 65 yards, 6:12.**
- KC – Christian Okoye 1-yard run (Nick Lowery kick), 5:22. Jets 34–31. **Drive: 6 plays, 70 yards, 2:40.**
- KC – James Saxon 1-yard run (Nick Lowery kick), 0:02. Chiefs 38–34. **Drive: 14 plays, 68 yards, 2:55.**

**Top passers**

- NYJ – Pat Ryan – 13/25, 198 yards, 2 TD
- KC – Steve DeBerg – 16/25, 167 yards, 3 TD, INT

**Top rushers**

- NYJ – Freeman McNeil – 13 rushes, 76 yards
- KC – Christian Okoye – 16 rushes, 68 yards, TD

**Top receivers**

- NYJ – Al Toon – 5 receptions, 102 yards, TD
- KC – Stephone Paige – 4 receptions, 113 yards, 2 TD

==== Week 15: at New York Giants ====
Week 15: Kansas City Chiefs at New York Giants – Game summary

Quarter	1	2	3	4	Total
Chiefs	0	3	9	0	**12**
**Giants**	7	0	7	14	**28**

at Giants Stadium, East Rutherford, New Jersey

- Date: December 11
- Game time: 1:00 p.m. EST/12:00 p.m. CST
- Game weather: Mostly Cloudy, 20 °F (−7 °C)
- Game attendance: 69,807
- Referee: Jim Tunney
- TV announcers (NBC): Don Criqui and Bob Trumpy
- Recap, Game Book

Game information

**First quarter**

- NYG – Mark Bavaro 12-yard pass from Phil Simms (Paul McFadden kick), 9:00. Giants 7–0. **Drive: 10 plays, 61 yards, 6:00.**

**Second quarter**

- KC – Nick Lowery 31-yard field goal, 0:17. Giants 7–3. **Drive: 10 plays, 26 yards, 4:01.**

**Third quarter**

- KC – Nick Lowery 51-yard field goal, 12:22. Giants 7–6. **Drive: 5 plays, 27 yards, 4:38.**
- NYG – Mark Bavaro 24-yard pass from Phil Simms (Paul McFadden kick), 6:53. Giants 14–6. **Drive: 4 plays, 43 yards, 2:07.**
- KC – Nick Lowery 46-yard field goal, 4:45. Giants 14–9. **Drive: 8 plays, 33 yards, 2:08.**
- KC – Nick Lowery 41-yard field goal, 0:00. Giants 14–12. **Drive: 11 plays, 52 yards, 2:15.**

**Fourth quarter**

- NYG – Ottis Anderson 2-yard run (Paul McFadden kick), 9:38. Giants 21–12. **Drive: 10 plays, 56 yards, 5:22.**
- NYG – Maurice Carthon 5-yard run (Paul McFadden kick), 2:30. Giants 28–12. **Drive: 8 plays, 51 yards, 5:24.**

**Top passers**

- KC – Steve DeBerg – 15/35, 174 yards
- NYG – Phil Simms – 6/15, 93 yards, 2 TD, INT

**Top rushers**

- KC – Herman Heard – 13 rushes, 46 yards
- NYG – Joe Morris – 31 rushes, 140 yards

**Top receivers**

- KC – Jonathan Hayes – 5 receptions, 64 yards
- NYG – Mark Bavaro – 2 receptions, 36 yards, 2 TD

==== Week 16: at San Diego Chargers ====
Week 16: Kansas City Chiefs at San Diego Chargers – Game summary

Quarter	1	2	3	4	Total
Chiefs	13	0	0	0	**13**
**Chargers**	10	7	7	0	**24**

at Jack Murphy Stadium, San Diego, California

- Date: December 18
- Game time: 3:00 p.m. CST/1:00 p.m. PST
- Game weather: Partly Cloudy, 62 °F (17 °C)
- Game attendance: 26,339
- Referee: Johnny Grier
- TV announcers (NBC): Jay Randolph and Dave Rowe
- Recap, Game Book

Game information

**First quarter**

- KC – Paul Palmer 26-yard run (Nick Lowery kick), 13:31. Chiefs 7–0. **Drive: 4 plays, 80 yards, 1:23.**
- SD – Gary Anderson 9-yard run (Steve DeLine kick), 8:21. Tied 7–7. **Drive: 8 plays, 65 yards, 5:01.**
- KC – Jonathan Hayes 4-yard pass from Steve DeBerg (kick aborted), 2:46. Chiefs 13–7. **Drive: 12 plays, 75 yards, 5:23.**
- SD – Steve DeLine 45-yard field goal, 0:08. Chiefs 13–10. **Drive: 7 plays, 35 yards, 2:28.**

**Second quarter**

- SD – Mark Malone 5-yard run (Steve DeLine kick), 3:06. Chargers 17–13. **Drive: 12 plays, 64 yards, 7:20.**

**Third quarter**

- SD – Jamie Holland 94-yard kickoff return (Steve DeLine kick), 14:44. Chargers 24–13.

**Fourth quarter**

- No scoring plays.

**Top passers**

- KC – Steve DeBerg – 17/36, 187 yards, TD, 2 INT
- SD – Mark Malone – 6/10, 91 yards

**Top rushers**

- KC – James Saxon – 15 rushes, 63 yards
- SD – Gary Anderson – 34 rushes, 217 yards, TD

**Top receivers**

- KC – Stephone Paige – 5 receptions, 87 yards
- SD – Anthony Miller – 2 receptions, 33 yards

=== Standings ===
AFC West
	W	L	T	PCT	DIV	CONF	PF	PA	STK
^{(3)} Seattle Seahawks	9	7	0	.563	6–2	8–4	339	329	W2
Denver Broncos	8	8	0	.500	3–5	5–7	327	352	W1
Los Angeles Raiders	7	9	0	.438	6–2	6–6	325	369	L2
San Diego Chargers	6	10	0	.375	3–5	4–8	231	332	W2
Kansas City Chiefs	4	11	1	.281	2–6	4–9–1	254	320	L2
