= Al Saunders =

American football coach (born 1947)

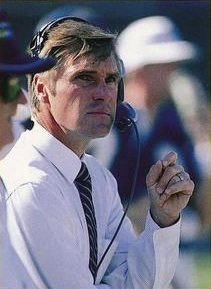
- Saunders with the San Diego Chargers in 1986

Personal information
- Born: February 1, 1947 (age 79); London, England

Career information
- High school: St. Ignatius (San Francisco, California, U.S.)
- College: San Jose State

Career history
- USC (1970–1971) Graduate assistant; Missouri (1972) Wide receivers coach; Utah State (1973–1975) Play-caller & offensive backfield coach; California (1976–1981) Assistant head coach, offensive coordinator & quarterbacks coach; Tennessee (1982) Offensive coordinator & quarterbacks coach; San Diego Chargers (1983–1988); Assistant head coach & wide receivers coach (1983–1985); Head coach (1986–1988); Kansas City Chiefs (1989–1998) Assistant head coach & wide receivers coach; St. Louis Rams (1999–2000) Associate head coach & wide receivers coach; Kansas City Chiefs (2001–2005) Assistant head coach & offensive coordinator; Washington Redskins (2006–2007) Associate head coach & offensive coordinator; St. Louis Rams (2008) Offensive coordinator; Baltimore Ravens (2009–2010) Senior offensive assistant; Oakland Raiders (2011–2014); Offensive coordinator & quarterbacks coach (2011); Senior offensive assistant (2012–2014); Miami Dolphins (2015) Senior offensive assistant; Cleveland Browns (2016–2018); Senior offensive assistant & wide receivers coach (2016–2017); Senior assistant/special projects (2018)

Awards and highlights
- Super Bowl champion (XXXIV)

Head coaching record
- Regular season: 17–22 (.436)
- Coaching profile at Pro Football Reference

Alan Keith Saunders (born February 1, 1947) is an American football coach.

== Personal life ==
Saunders was born in the north London suburb of Hendon as part of a sporting family; his great-uncle, Ron Saunders, played soccer for a number of teams in The Football League and later became a manager, winning honours with Norwich City and Aston Villa.

Saunders attended St. Ignatius College Preparatory and graduated in 1964. He is a former prep All-American swimmer, Junior Olympic Champion and national record holder and has been inducted into the San Francisco Prep Hall of Fame in the sport.

Saunders is a member of the San Jose State University Hall of Fame. He earned Academic All-American football honors as a three-year starter and team captain at defensive back and wide receiver from 1966 to 1968. An accomplished distance runner, he was veteran of numerous marathons and was crowned the Road Runners Club of America's Masters 5K National Champion in 1996.

He is a member of Theta Chi fraternity and has been enshrined in their Hall of Honor, he was the inaugural recipient of the alumnus "Shug Jordan Award" for recognition of his collegiate academic and athletic accomplishments as well as receiving their prestigious "George T Kilavos Alumni Award" in 2021 for meritorious service and their "Distinguished Achievement Award" in 2016 for professional and life accomplishments.

Saunders graduated cum laude from San Jose State College in 1969, earned a master's degree in education from Stanford University in 1970 and completed Doctoral studies work in Education at the University of Southern California in 1971 and 1972.

Recognized in The Marquis Publications Board's "Who's Who in the World", "Who's Who in America", "Who's Who in the West", Who's Who in California" and "International Leaders in Achievement", Saunders was awarded California's prestigious "Golden State Award" in 1989 for excellence in community service and leadership. He was selected to appear in the 1969 edition of "Outstanding College Athletes of America" in recognition of his "outstanding ability, accomplishments and service".

Saunders is married to the former Karen Mize, daughter of television personality and recording artist Billy Mize, a three-time winner of Academy of Country Music's Personality of the Year Award ('65–'67). Saunders has three children, distinguished clinical physiologist Dr. Korrin E. Saunders, Emmy award-winning film maker William J Saunders, and NFL coach Robert C. Saunders.

== Coaching career ==
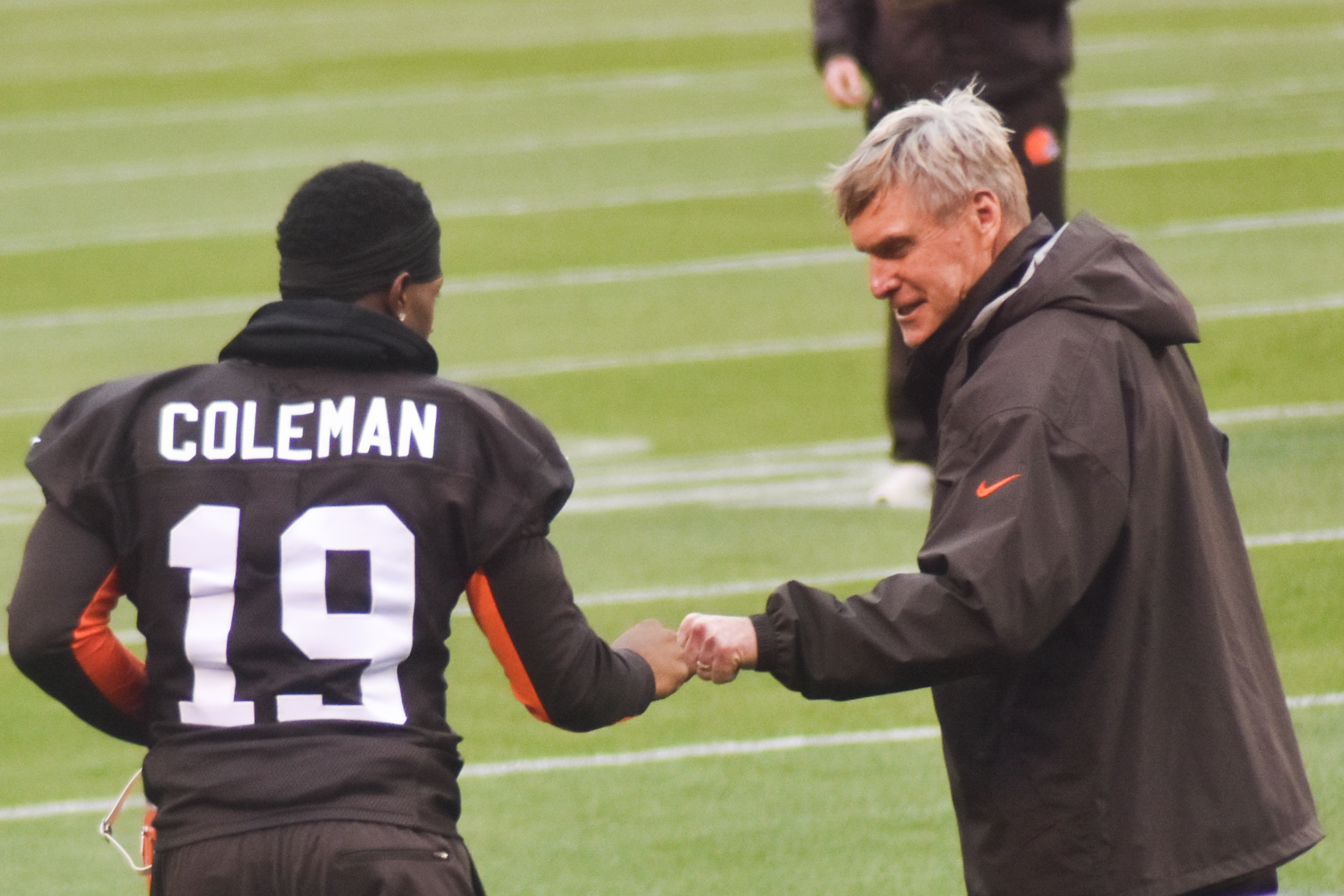
Saunders with the Cleveland Browns in 2016

Saunders retired in 2018 after spending 38 years coaching in the NFL. He was considered one of the most accomplished and innovative offensive minds in the game. During his career, he served as head coach of the San Diego Chargers and assistant head coach for three Hall of Fame Coaches – Don Coryell (San Diego Chargers), Dick Vermeil (Kansas City Chiefs) and Joe Gibbs (Washington Redskins) as well as the legendary Marty Schottenhiemer (Kansas City Chiefs). He was a Super Bowl (XXXIV) winner in 2000 with the St. Louis Rams.

In 2005, he was named "USA Today Offensive Coach of the Year", as well as being named by Pro Football Weekly as "The best offensive play caller in football inside the 20 yard line". In 2017, Saunders was cited by ESPN as the "NFL's #1 Offensive Co-Ordinator thru the previous 25 years" and named by Bleacher Report as the "Best Offensive Co-Ordinator in the Kansas City Chiefs Franchise History" in 2011.

Saunders has tutored several NCAA All Americans, numerous NFL All Pro selections and has had an influence on the careers of 15 offensive players currently enshrined in the NFL Hall of Fame. He has contributed to offenses that have ranked #1 in the NFL in Total Offense, Passing or Rushing 11 times and finished in the top five 31 times.

Prior to entering the NFL, Saunders spent 12 years as a college assistant coach. He began his coaching career as a graduate assistant at USC under John McKay from 1970 to 1971 and served as receivers coach for the Missouri's Fiesta Bowl team in 1972.

Saunders spent 1973 through 1975 as play-caller and offensive backfield coach at Utah State, where he coached Louie Giammona to become the NCAA leader in all purpose yardage and rushing in 1974 and 1975. He then spent six seasons as assistant head coach/offensive coordinator/quarterbacks coach at California, where he tutored All-American quarterbacks Joe Roth and Rich Campbell. He guided the Golden Bears to set 32 NCAA, conference and school records and finished each season ranked in the top ten in the nation in passing. His final collegiate stop was in 1982 as offensive coordinator/quarterbacks coach under Johnny Majors at Tennessee, where he built an explosive, record-setting offense featuring future NFL first-round wide receiver picks Willie Gault and Clyde Duncan.

Saunders first NFL head coaching position came with the San Diego Chargers as interim head coach following the resignation of Don Coryell after Coryell posted three non winning seasons and a 1–7 start in 1986. At 38 years old, Saunders became the youngest head coach in the NFL. He previously worked for the Chargers as receivers coach in 1983–84 and assistant head coach in 1985–86 for what was one of the most prolific offenses in the history of modern football. In 1985, San Diego's "Air Coryell" offense led the NFL in passing and total offense for an unprecedented fifth time in six years. Saunders tutored Hall of Fame receivers Charlie Joiner and Kellen Winslow and oversaw the development of Pro Bowl receivers Wes Chandler, Lionel James and Gary Anderson.

Saunders' first full season as head coach in 1987 was marked by the NFL players union strike and the "Replacement" games. While leading the "Replacement" players to an undefeated 3–0 record (matched only by Joe Gibbs' eventual Super Bowl Champion Washington Redskins), Saunders guided the team to an overall 8–7 record becoming the Chargers first winning season in 5 years. The following year, with the loss of Dan Fouts, Winslow, Chandler and several other key players the team finished 6–10. After that season, Saunders was replaced by Dan Henning, amidst reports of philosophical differences between him and Director of Football Operations Steve Ortmayer. Henning had records of 6–10, 6-10 and 4-12 the subsequent three years and was fired in 1991.

From 1989 until 1998, Saunders was with the Kansas City Chiefs. He served as the assistant head coach and wide receivers coach working with Pro Bowl performers Carlos Carson, Stephone Paige, Webster Slaughter, Andre Rison and Derrick Alexander. Saunders worked for 10 winning seasons under the highly respected head coach Marty Schottenheimer.

After Schottenheimer's unexpected resignation from the Chiefs, Saunders joined the St. Louis Rams coaching staff under the legendary Dick Vermeil. Serving as associate head coach and receivers coach with the Rams (1999–2000), he helped create one of the most dynamic and explosive offenses that the NFL had ever seen, and helped lead the Rams to a Super Bowl XXXIV victory. Leading the NFL in virtually every significant offensive category, "The Greatest Show on Turf" established numerous NFL records for scoring and offensive production. The emergence of Hall of Fame quarterback Kurt Warner, the production of Hall of Fame running back Marshall Faulk, and Saunders' development of Pro Bowlers Isaac Bruce and Torry Holt were all largely cited as the key factor in the Rams' innovative and creative success.

When Vermeil came out of retirement in 2001, Saunders reunited with his old mentor and former team, the Kansas City Chiefs, as the assistant head coach/offensive coordinator until Vermeil's final retirement in 2006. Under Saunders's direction as coordinator, the Chiefs offense was the most productive unit in the entire NFL during that 5-year span. 46 franchise records for offense production were established and no team scored more points (2,175), gained more yards (30,470), or scored more touchdowns (262) during that time. Saunders's offense also broke numerous NFL records including a single season record of 398 first downs, most combined first downs in a game (64), established the highest red-zone touchdown scoring percentage in league history (77.8), longest touchdown pass in league history (99 yds), fewest fumbles in a season (2), tied a 42-year-old mark with 63 rushing touchdowns over two seasons, became the first team in NFL history to have three runners have 150-yard games in a single season, and was the only team ever to score 8 rushing touchdowns in a single game.

Also during that period, Priest Holmes twice broke the NFL single-season rushing touchdown record (27) and was named NFL offensive player of the year (2003). Additionally, Tony Gonzalez set the NFL single-season receiving mark for tight ends (102 in 2004), Trent Green became only the fourth player in league history to finish four consecutive seasons with a QB rating above 90, and 11 different offensive players enjoyed Pro Bowl years — all under Saunders' direction. Saunders was ranked as the #1 Offensive Coordinator in the past 25 years in the NFL by ESPN and in 2005, and was named USA Today's Offensive Coach of the Year.

On January 19, 2006, he joined the coaching staff of the Washington Redskins as associate head coach and offensive coordinator to Hall of Fame coach Joe Gibbs. With one of the most dominant rushing teams in the league, Saunders led Washington's offense to a playoff berth in 2007. Saunders served under Gibbs until his retirement two years later.

On January 30, 2008, Saunders was hired as offensive coordinator for the St. Louis Rams. Constructing an offense around the skills of Pro Bowl running back Steven Jackson, the Rams had one of the most dominant rushing attacks in the NFL.

In 2009, Saunders was hired away by the Baltimore Ravens to serve as the senior offensive assistant to John Harbaugh. Saunders contributed to designing an offense that produced back-to-back playoff appearances for the Ravens and worked closely with Pro Bowl performers Todd Heap and Dennis Pitta.

On January 20, 2011, Saunders was hired by Al Davis and Hue Jackson to serve as the offensive coordinator and QB coach for the Oakland Raiders. Under Saunders' direction, Oakland's offense finished with the second highest yardage total in franchise history (6,072) and ranked among the NFL leaders in rushing, passing and total offense.

On January 31, 2012, following Davis' death and Jackson's firing, and after interviewing for several vacant offensive coordinator positions with other organizations, Saunders agreed to return to Oakland as senior offensive assistant under Dennis Allen. He served in that capacity for the following three seasons.

Saunders announced his retirement on April 10, 2015, but returned on October 7 as the Miami Dolphins' senior offensive assistant under interim coach Dan Campbell. Saunders worked primarily with the wide receivers. During this time, Jarvis Landry set a franchise record with 110 receptions and became the most productive receiver in NFL history during his first two seasons with a total of 194.

On January 19, 2016, Saunders rejoined Jackson at the Cleveland Browns to be the team's senior offensive assistant. He additionally coached wide receivers, and turned former QB Terrelle Pryor into a 1,000-yard receiver in his first full season at the position. Saunders remained with the Browns until retiring after the 2018 NFL season.

== Head coaching record ==
Team	Year	Regular season					Postseason			
Team	Year	Won	Lost	Ties	Win %	Finish	Won	Lost	Win %	Result
SD	1986	3	5	0	.375	5th in AFC West	-	-	–	
SD	1987	8	7	0	.533	3rd in AFC West			–	
SD	1988	6	10	0	.375	4th in AFC West			–	
Total		17	22	0	.439		0	0	–	–
