= Sam Seale =

American football player (born 1962)

Green Bay Packers
- Title: Scout

Personal information
- Born: October 6, 1962 (age 64); Bridgetown, Barbados
- Listed height: 5 ft 9 in (1.75 m)
- Listed weight: 175 lb (79 kg)

Career information
- Position: Cornerback (No. 88, 43, 30, 23, 22)
- High school: Orange (Orange, New Jersey, U.S.)
- College: Western Colorado
- NFL draft: 1984: 8th round, 224th overall pick

Career history
- Los Angeles Raiders (1984–1987); San Diego Chargers (1988–1991); Los Angeles Raiders (1992); Los Angeles Rams (1993)

Career NFL statistics
- Interceptions: 11
- Fumble recoveries: 5
- Touchdowns: 2
- Stats at Pro Football Reference

Samuel Ricardo Seale (born October 6, 1962) is a Barbadian-born former American football cornerback who played ten seasons in the National Football League (NFL), mainly for the Los Angeles Raiders.

== Career ==
Seale began serving as a scout for the Green Bay Packers in 1994. On May 19, 2026, Seale was promoted from national scout to senior national scout.
