= David Richards (American football) =

American football player (born 1966)

No. 65, 67, 62
- Position: Guard

Personal information
- Born: April 11, 1966 (age 60); Staten Island, New York, U.S.
- Listed height: 6 ft 5 in (1.96 m)
- Listed weight: 315 lb (143 kg)

Career information
- High school: Highland Park (Dallas, Texas)
- College: Southern Methodist (1984-86); UCLA (1987)
- NFL draft: 1988: 4th round, 98th overall pick

Career history
- San Diego Chargers (1988–1992); Detroit Lions (1993); Atlanta Falcons (1994–1996); New England Patriots (1996)

Awards and highlights
- First-team All-Pac-10 (1987)

Career NFL statistics
- Games played: 135
- Games started: 128
- Fumble recoveries: 5
- Stats at Pro Football Reference

David Reed Richards (born April 11, 1966) is an American former professional football player who was a guard for nine seasons in the National Football League (NFL). He played college football for the SMU Mustangs and UCLA Bruins.

A standout at Highland Park High School in Dallas, Texas, the 6-foot-5, 310-pound Richards was the first lineman to be named Parade Magazine's National High School Player of the Year in 1983.

In college, he was an All-Southwest Conference selection at guard as a sophomore at Southern Methodist University. The following season, he earned All-SWC honors as a tackle at SMU.

Prior to his senior season, the NCAA issued the first, and to date only, ‘Death Penalty’ to a college football team for recruiting violations prompting Richards to transfer to the University of California, Los Angeles, for his senior season.

A fourth-round selection of the San Diego Chargers in the 1988 NFL draft, Richards spent five seasons with the Chargers (1988–1992), starting at right tackle (1988) and right guard (1989–92) in all 80 games.

In April 1993, Richards signed a three-year, $5.1 million agreement to play for the Detroit Lions. He started 15 games at left guard for the Lions during the 1993 season before signing a two-year contract with the Atlanta Falcons in August 1994. With the Falcons, Richards started 26 games during the 1994 and 1995 seasons. In 1996, he started six games for the Falcons before he was released by the team. He was claimed on waivers by the New England Patriots in October 1996.

Today, Richards lives in Dallas, where he works in commercial real estate.
