= Joe Campbell (American football, born 1966) =

American football player (born 1966)

No. 95, 99, 45
- Position: Defensive end

Personal information
- Born: December 28, 1966 (age 59); Chandler, Arizona, U.S.
- Listed height: 6 ft 4 in (1.93 m)
- Listed weight: 245 lb (111 kg)

Career information
- High school: Verbum Dei (Los Angeles, California)
- College: New Mexico State
- NFL draft: 1988: 4th round, 91st overall pick

Career history
- San Diego Chargers (1988–1989); Los Angeles Raiders (1990)*; New York/New Jersey Knights (1991); BC Lions (1991); Hamilton Tiger-Cats (1991); Dallas Texans (1993)
- * Offseason or practice squad member only

Career NFL statistics
- Sacks: 3
- Stats at Pro Football Reference

Joseph Campbell Jr. (born December 28, 1966) is an American former professional football player who was a defensive end in the National Football League (NFL) and Canadian Football League (CFL). He played college football for the New Mexico State Aggies and was selected by the San Diego Chargers in the fourth round of the 1988 NFL draft. He played for the Chargers from 1988 to 1989.
