= Steve DeLine =

American football player (born 1961)

No. 6, 2
- Position: Placekicker

Personal information
- Born: August 19, 1961 (age 65); Denver, Colorado, U.S.
- Listed height: 5 ft 11 in (1.80 m)
- Listed weight: 185 lb (84 kg)

Career information
- High school: Cherry Creek (Greenwood Village, Colorado)
- College: Colorado State
- NFL draft: 1987: 7th round, 189th overall pick

Career history
- San Francisco 49ers (1987)*; Philadelphia Eagles (1987); San Diego Chargers (1988); Philadelphia Eagles (1989)
- * Offseason or practice squad member only

Career NFL statistics
- Games played: 8
- Stats at Pro Football Reference

Steven Braun DeLine (born August 19, 1961) is an American former professional football player who was a placekicker in the National Football League (NFL). He played college football for the Colorado State Rams and was selected by the San Francisco 49ers in the seventh round of the 1987 NFL draft. He played in the NFL for the San Diego Chargers in 1988 and for the Philadelphia Eagles in 1989.
