= Gary Anderson (running back) =

American gridiron football player (born 1961)

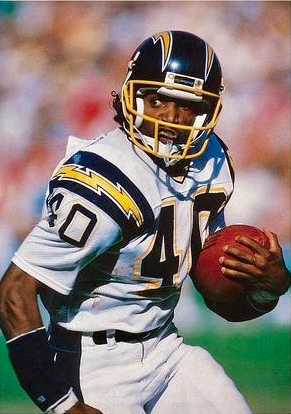
- Anderson with the San Diego Chargers c. 1987

No. 43, 40, 34
- Position: Running back

Personal information
- Born: April 18, 1961 (age 65); Columbia, Missouri, U.S.
- Listed height: 6 ft 0 in (1.83 m)
- Listed weight: 180 lb (82 kg)

Career information
- High school: Hickman (Columbia)
- College: Arkansas
- NFL draft: 1983: 1st round, 20th overall pick

Career history
- Tampa Bay Bandits (1983-1985); San Diego Chargers (1985–1988); Tampa Bay Buccaneers (1990–1993); Detroit Lions (1993); Memphis Mad Dogs (1995)

Awards and highlights
- Pro Bowl (1986); PFWA All-Rookie Team (1985); Second-team All-SWC (1982)

Career NFL statistics
- Rushing yards: 3,409
- Average: 3.9
- Touchdowns: 32
- Stats at Pro Football Reference

Gary Wayne Anderson (born April 18, 1961) is an American former professional football player who was a running back in the National Football League (NFL), United States Football League (USFL) and Canadian Football League (CFL) from 1983 to 1995.

== USFL ==
Anderson was drafted in the first round of the 1983 NFL Draft by the San Diego Chargers, but could not agree on a contract. Instead, Anderson signed to play for the Tampa Bay Bandits of the USFL in 1983 after a college football career at the University of Arkansas. Anderson had filed suit against his first agent, Dr. Jerry A. Argovitz, and the Tampa Bay Bandits. The suit alleged that Argovitz misrepresented the Chargers' offer and that Argovitz steered Anderson to the Bandits in exchange for a USFL franchise (the Houston Gamblers). Sports Illustrated August 29, 1983.

Anderson started late in the season and quickly became the starting running back for the Bandits. He finished with 516 yards on 97 carries with 4 touchdowns in 1983. In 1984, Anderson rushed for 1008 yards on 268 carries and scored 19 touchdowns (league leader). In 1985, Anderson had his best USFL season as he rushed for 1207 yards on 276 carries and had 16 touchdowns. He was named to one All-Star team in his USFL career and is the 4th leading rusher in USFL history.

== NFL ==
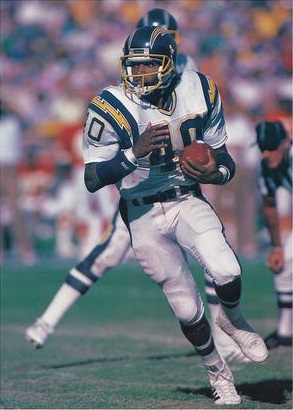
Anderson c. 1985

In 1985, Anderson signed with the NFL's San Diego Chargers and was used primarily as a backup running back and kick returner. He returned a kickoff for a 98-yard touchdown on November 17, 1985, that was the longest kickoff return of the 1985 season. In 1986, he caught 80 passes out of the backfield for 871 yards and 8 touchdowns and was named to the Pro Bowl that season. He continued to be a reserve and special teams player for the Chargers until 1988, when he became the starting running back and rushed for 1119 yards on 225 carries.

In 1989, he sat out the season in a contract dispute with the Chargers. Anderson returned in 1990 with the Tampa Bay Buccaneers and rushed for 646 yards on 166 carries. He played with the Buccaneers as a reserve running back until 1993, when he played briefly for the Detroit Lions before retiring.

== CFL ==
In 1995, Anderson came out of retirement to play in the CFL for the expansion Memphis Mad Dogs where he joined a man who coached against him in the USFL, Pepper Rodgers. Anderson scored three touchdowns and gained 523 rushing and receiving yards and scoring 4 total touchdowns in his lone CFL season. When the US teams folded, the Saskatchewan Roughriders selected him the 12th round of the dispersal draft, but released him prior to the start of the 1996 season.

== Professional career statistics ==
Year	Team	Games		Rushing					Receiving				
Year	Team	G	GS	Att	Yds	Avg	Lng	TD	Rec	Yds	Avg	Lng	TD
1983	TBB	8	7	97	516	5.3	73	4	29	347	12.0	49	0
1984	TBB	18	18	268	1,008	3.8	40	19	66	682	10.3	37	2
1985	TBB	18	17	276	1,207	4.4	68	16	72	678	9.4	41	4
1985	SD	12	6	116	429	3.7	27	4	35	422	12.1	52	2
1986	SD	16	12	127	442	3.5	17	1	80	871	10.9	65	8
1987	SD	12	7	80	260	3.3	25	3	47	503	10.7	38	2
1988	SD	14	13	225	1,119	5.0	36	3	32	182	5.7	20	0
1989	DNP	Missed season - Contract dispute											
1990	TB	16	13	166	646	3.9	22	3	38	464	12.2	74	2
1991	TB	16	5	72	263	3.7	64	1	25	184	7.4	21	0
1992	TB	15	4	55	194	3.5	18	1	34	284	8.4	34	0
1993	TB	6	1	28	56	2.0	13	0	11	89	8.1	28	1
1993	DET	4	0	0	0	–	0	0	0	0	–	0	0
1995	MEM	14	0	66	250	3.8	17	3	28	273	9.8	27	1
Career		169	103	1,576	6,390	4.1	73	58	497	4,979	10.0	74	22
