= Steve Ortmayer =

American football player, coach, and executive (1944–2021)

Personal information
- Born: February 13, 1944; Painesville, Ohio, U.S.
- Died: March 9, 2021 (aged 77); Lexington, Kentucky, U.S.

Career information
- College: Vanderbilt, La Verne

Career history

Coaching
- Colorado (1967–1973) Defensive line coach; Georgia Tech (1974) Offensive line coach; Kansas City Chiefs (1975–1977) Special teams coordinator; Oakland/Los Angeles Raiders (1978–1986) Special teams coordinator; Los Angeles Raiders (1990–1994) Special teams coordinator; Green Bay Packers (1999) Special teams coordinator; Kentucky (2003–2010) Special teams coordinator

Operations
- San Diego Chargers (1987–1989) General manager

Awards and highlights
- 2× Super Bowl champion (XV, XVIII)
- Executive profile at Pro Football Reference

Conrad Stephen Ortmayer (February 13, 1944 – March 9, 2021) was an American football player, coach, and executive who served as the general manager of the National Football League (NFL)'s San Diego Chargers and St. Louis Rams.

== Early life and playing career ==
Born in Painesville, Ohio, Ortmayer grew up in Nashville, Tennessee, and Dallas, Texas. He played one season at Vanderbilt University before transferring to the University of La Verne and playing three seasons there.

== Coaching career ==
Ortmayer got his start in coaching at the University of Colorado at Boulder in 1967 and also spent a season at Georgia Tech. From 1968 to 1973, he was assistant head coach, offensive line coach, and defensive line coach for Colorado. In 1974, he was assistant head coach and offensive line coach for the Georgia Tech Yellow Jackets. After one year with the Yellow Jackets, Ortmayer moved on to the National Football League (NFL) to be the special teams coach of the Kansas City Chiefs from 1975 to 1977. Ortmayer spent 25 seasons in the NFL and won two Super Bowl rings as special teams coach with the Oakland/Los Angeles Raiders. In 2003, he became assistant head coach, special teams coordinator, and tight ends coach at the University of Kentucky. Ortmayer has coached in five college bowl games and for eight NFL playoff teams, in addition to his two Super Bowl wins with the Raiders.

== Executive career ==
In 1987, Ortmayer moved to the San Diego Chargers as general manager where he served until his release in December 1989. He then rejoined the Raiders until moving to an administrative office with the Los Angeles Rams. With the Raiders, he served in a number of capacities ranging from assistant coach to director of football operations. Ortmayer was on the sidelines when the Raiders won both Super Bowl XV and Super Bowl XVIII. In 1995, as vice president of football operations of the Rams, Ortmayer oversaw the move from Los Angeles to St. Louis. In 2000, Ortmayer was named director of player personnel of the XFL's Memphis Maniax. In 2022, Ortmayer was inducted into the Kentucky Pro Football Hall of Fame.
