= Jamie Holland =

American football player (born 1964)

No. 86, 82, 87, 1, 8
- Position: Wide receiver

Personal information
- Born: February 1, 1964 (age 62); Raleigh, North Carolina, U.S.
- Listed height: 6 ft 1 in (1.85 m)
- Listed weight: 192 lb (87 kg)

Career information
- High school: Wake Forest-Rolesville (Wake Forest, North Carolina)
- College: Ohio State
- NFL draft: 1987: 7th round, 173rd overall pick

Career history
- San Diego Chargers (1987–1989); Los Angeles Raiders (1990–1991); Cleveland Browns (1992); Green Bay Packers (1993)*; Winnipeg Blue Bombers (1994–1995); Saskatchewan Roughriders (1995)
- * Offseason or practice squad member only

Career NFL statistics
- Receptions: 73
- Receiving yards: 1,037
- Touchdowns: 2
- Stats at Pro Football Reference

Jamie Lorenza Holland (born February 1, 1964) is an American former professional football player who was a wide receiver in the National Football League (NFL) and Canadian Football League (CFL). He played six seasons for the San Diego Chargers (1987–1989), the Los Angeles Raiders (1990–1991), and the Cleveland Browns (1992). He played college football for the Ohio State Buckeyes and was selected by the Chargers in the seventh round of the 1987 NFL draft with the 173rd overall pick.

In 2010, he became a volunteer coach for the Capital City Steelers, a Pop Warner youth football and cheer organization in Raleigh, NC. He has also served as a teacher and a wide receiver coach for Wake Forest High School.
