= Vince Abbott =

English-born American football player (born 1958)

No. 10
- Position: Placekicker

Personal information
- Born: May 31, 1958 (age 68); London, England, U.K.
- Listed height: 6 ft 0 in (1.83 m)
- Listed weight: 240 lb (109 kg)

Career information
- High school: Tsawwassen (BC)
- College: Washington (1976-1977); Cal State-Fullerton (1978-1980)
- NFL draft: 1981: undrafted

Career history
- San Francisco 49ers (1982)*; Miami Dolphins (1982)*; Los Angeles Express (1983); Chicago Bears (1984)*; Tampa Bay Buccaneers (1985)*; Los Angeles Raiders (1986)*; San Diego Chargers (1987–1988)
- * Offseason or practice squad member only

Career NFL statistics
- Field goals made: 21
- Field goals attempted: 34
- Field goals %: 61.8
- Stats at Pro Football Reference

Vincent Steven Abbott (born May 31, 1958) is an English-born former professional American football player. Born in London, Abbott played at the University of Washington, then transferred to Cal State Fullerton, and went undrafted in 1981. He played for the USFL for the Los Angeles Express. During the 1987 pre-season, Abbott went 7 for 8 on field goals, four over 40 yards beating out veteran kicker Rolf Benirschke.

In his first NFL game, the 1987 season opener in Kansas City against the Kansas City Chiefs, Abbott successfully made two out of three field goals, a thirty-two yarder and a thirty-three yarder, the second tying the game at 13 with just over three minutes to play. In game 7 against the Cleveland Browns. Vince Abbott, successfully converted a twenty-yard kick with 1:46 remaining in the game, tying the score at 24 apiece, and he was able to convert a 33-yard overtime kick to secure victory for the Chargers, 27–24. That kick lifted the Chargers to 6–1, their best start since their first season in 1961, and put them in first place in their division. Three field goals each against the Indianapolis Colts including a game-winning field goal from 38 yards. Week 9 against the Raiders, Vince kicked 3 field goals enabling the Chargers to win 16–14. The San Diego Chargers momentum going as they ran their record to 8–1. Vince Abbott made his mark, kicking under pressure. In the Raider game, it was his first field goal attempt when the Chargers were leading.

Although the Chargers would fade, losing their final six games to miss the playoffs, Abbott retained his kicking duties into 1989, having finished the 1987 with a 13 for 22 field goals, with seven of his misses coming from beyond forty yards. Abbott played in 12 games during 1988, for a Chargers team that went 6–10, and converted 8 out of 12 field goals. This was his last season in the NFL; he ended his career a perfect 13 for 13 on game-winning field goals.

Abbott appeared with his wife and in-laws on Family Feud in 1983 and promoted his upcoming season in the USFL.

Abbott resides in Newport Beach and is an avid power lifter benching over 475 lbs. His career after the NFL includes medical sales and business development. Abbott continues to coach aspiring field goal kickers and weight lifters.
