= 1987 San Diego Chargers season =

NFL team season

- Owner: Alex Spanos
- General manager: Steve Ortmayer
- Head coach: Al Saunders
- Home stadium: Jack Murphy Stadium

Results
- Record: 8–7
- Division place: 3rd AFC West
- Playoffs: Did not qualify
- All-Pros: 3: T Jim Lachey (2nd team); P Ralf Mojsiejenko (2nd team); TE Kellen Winslow (2nd team)
- Pro Bowlers: 3: T Jim Lachey; P Ralf Mojsiejenko; TE Kellen Winslow

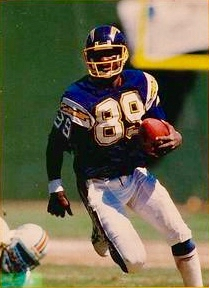
Wes Chandler led the team with 617 receiving yards in 1987. He also served as the Chargers' union representative during the players' strike.

The 1987 San Diego Chargers was the franchise's 18th season in the National Football League (NFL), and the 28th overall. The team improved on their 4–12 record in 1986, finishing 8–7 but missing the playoffs. A players’ strike reduced the regular season schedule from sixteen to fifteen games. The Chargers started the season 8–1, with victories over eventual division winners Indianapolis and Cleveland, before collapsing to lose their final six games of the season, narrowly missing the playoffs. All but one of their final six losses came to teams that made the postseason.

As was the case with all NFL teams in 1987, the Chargers were obliged to field a replacement team for three weeks due to the NFLPA strike. This team, dubbed the 'Re-Chargers' by head coach Al Saunders, was made up primarily of players who had missed the final cut for an NFL squad in preseason. While the regular players picketed outside San Diego's Jack Murphy Stadium, the new Chargers won three games out of three against other replacement teams. After the strike ended, most of the regular Chargers reclaimed their jobs, though some replacements were able to keep their places in the squad beyond the end of the 1987 season.

In the twelve non-strike games, San Diego performed fairly well on defense, with defensive end Lee Williams, linebacker Billy Ray Smith and safety Vencie Glenn among the leaders. The offense, however, struggled increasingly as the season wore on. With the run game contributing little, it fell to quarterback Dan Fouts and the passing attack to produce points, but they were hampered by sacks, turnovers and Fouts' struggle to recapture his mid-career form. It would be his final season in the NFL, having spent his entire fifteen-year career in San Diego. Also retiring after the season was tight end Kellen Winslow, ending his nine-year career with a fifth Pro Bowl berth.

== Offseason ==
=== Departures and arrivals ===
San Diego lost a future Hall of Fame wide receiver during the offseason when Charlie Joiner announced his retirement. Joiner finished as the NFL career leader in receptions (750) and receiving yards (12,146). At 39, he considered himself too old to play on, but switched to a new role as the Chargers' receiving coach. The Chargers also traded their third-leading wide receiver from 1986, Trumaine Johnson, to the Buffalo Bills in exchange for linebacker David Brandon and a 3rd-round draft pick. They also switched backup running backs, trading Buford McGee and two future draft picks to the Rams in exchange for Barry Redden. McGee had scored seven touchdowns in the first nine weeks in 1986, but missed the final seven games after a double knee surgery; Redden was a former 1st-round draft pick, but went on to have only 30 carries during his two years with the Chargers. On the offensive line, the Chargers added Broderick Thompson, a former Cowboy who started only 3 games in 1987, but 76 out of a possible 80 from 1988 to 1992.

An established defensive player also left the active squad when linebacker Woodrow Lowe was placed on injured reserve during preseason; he did not play again, and was eventually released on 11 March 1988. Lowe spent his entire playing career with the Chargers, appearing in 164 out of a possible 165 games from 1976 to 1986. San Diego also added an established linebacker in Chip Banks, who had made the Pro Bowl in four of his five seasons with the Browns, though he had held out while in Cleveland. After playing a single season in San Diego, he did so once more, and never played for the Chargers again after 1987. On the defensive line, San Diego picked up Mike Charles, a nose tackle recently cut by Miami. He went on to start 25 games during three years with the Chargers. Meanwhile, defensive end Earl Wilson, who had started 15 games over the past two seasons, was cut after week 1. He was arrested as part of a drug investigation later the same day, though the Chargers stated the timing was coincidental and his release was based purely on performance. In the defensive backfield, San Diego traded cornerback Wayne Davis for Buffalo safety Martin Bayless. Bayless started every non-strike game for the Chargers in 1987, and went on to start 66 times in total during five seasons in San Diego.

The Chargers held a battle for the placekicker position through training camp and preseason, eventually won by free agent acquisition Vince Abbott, who secured his first NFL job after losing four previous training camp battles. This meant that veteran Rolf Benirschke lost his job after ten years in San Diego; he was traded to Dallas for a draft pick. Benirschke felt he wasn't given a fair chance to compete for the job after attempting no field goals in preseason. He left as the team's leading scorer (766 points), and the third-best kicker in league history by career field goal percentage (70.2%), though his accuracy had diminished through the past four seasons.

=== NFL draft ===
Despite having three veteran tight ends on their roster, the Chargers added more depth at that position with their 1st-round draft pick; Rod Bernstine had played at running back in high school, but converted to tight end under the advice of Texas A&M coach Jackie Sherrill. He had only 10 catches as a rookie, and eventually switched back to the running back position. Bernstine would finish his time with the Chargers having scored 19 touchdowns and rushed for over 2,000 yards, with a further 888 receiving yards.

Except for Bernstine, the Chargers received little production from their 1987 draft class, with all but four having left the team within two years. 2nd-round pick Lou Brock was placed on injured reserve with an infection of the lymphatic system after only one game, and released before the following season without playing again. Defensive end Karl Wilson started only twice in two years, while quarterback Mark Vlasic started three times in three years. Wide receiver Jamie Holland started in 12 games and also featured as a kickoff returner, but scored only twice in three seasons with the team.

1987 San Diego Chargers draft
Round	Pick	Player	Position	College	Notes
1	24	Rod Bernstine	Tight end	Texas A&M	
2	53	Lou Brock	Cornerback	USC	
3	59	Karl Wilson	Defensive end	LSU	
4	88	Mark Vlasic	Quarterback	Iowa	
5	115	Nelson Jones	Defensive back	NC State	
7	173	Jamie Holland	Wide receiver	Ohio State	
8	199	Joe MacEsker	Tackle	UTEP	
8	204	Michael "Ron" Brown	Linebacker	USC	
9	226	Thomas Wilcher	Running back	Michigan	
10	256	Anthony Anderson	Defensive back	Grambling State	Recalled to Chargers for strike games
11	284	Joe Goebel	Center	UCLA	Recalled to Chargers for strike games
12	310	Marcus Greenwood	Running back	UCLA	
Made roster * Made at least one Pro Bowl during career

== Personnel ==
=== Staff ===
1987 San Diego Chargers staff
Front office: Chairman of the board and president – Alex Spanos; Director of football operations – Steve Ortmayer; Assistant to the president – Johnny Sanders; Director of player personnel – Chet Franklin; Director of pro personnel – Rudy Feldman; Head coaches: Head coach – Al Saunders; Offensive coaches: Offensive coordinator – Dave Levy; Offensive line – Ed White; Quarterbacks – Roger Theder; Running backs – Bobby Jackson; Receivers – Charlie Joiner	Defensive coaches: Defensive coordinator – Ron Lynn; Defensive assistant / secondary – Jim Mora; Defensive line – Gunther Cunningham; Linebackers – Mike Haluchak; Special teams coaches: Special teams – Wayne Sevier

=== Roster ===
1987 San Diego Chargers roster
Quarterbacks (QB): 14 Dan Fouts; 9 Mark Herrmann; 13 Mark Vlasic; Running backs (RB): 42 Curtis Adams; 40 Gary Anderson; 20 Barry Redden; 43 Tim Spencer; Wide receivers (WR): 89 Wes Chandler; 86 Jamie Holland; 26 Lionel James; 81 Timmie Ware; Tight ends (TE): 82 Rod Bernstine; 88 Pete Holohan; 85 Eric Sievers; 80 Kellen Winslow	Offensive linemen (OL): 77 Sam Claphan G; 61 Ken Dallafior G; 70 James FitzPatrick G; 68 Gary Kowalski T; 74 Jim Lachey T; 62 Don Macek C; 60 Dennis McKnight G; 77 Curtis Rouse G; 76 Broderick Thompson T; Defensive linemen (DL): 96 Keith Baldwin DE; 71 Mike Charles NT; 78 Chuck Ehin NT; 92 Dee Hardison DE; 69 Les Miller DE; 75 Joe Phillips DE; 98 Terry Unrein; 99 Lee Williams DE; 72 Karl Wilson DE	Linebackers (LB): 56 Chip Banks OLB; 57 Thomas Benson ILB; 58 David Brandon OLB; 55 Steve Busick ILB; 52 Jeff Jackson ILB; 94 Randy Kirk ILB; 50 Gary Plummer ILB; 54 Billy Ray Smith OLB; Defensive backs (DB): 44 Martin Bayless SS; 22 Gill Byrd CB; 36 Mike Davis SS; 25 Vencie Glenn FS; 27 Daniel Hunter CB; 34 Elvis Patterson CB; 23 Danny Walters CB; Special teams (ST): 10 Vince Abbott K; 2 Ralf Mojsiejenko P	Reserve: 38 Lou Brock Jr. CB (IR); 37 Jeffery Dale S (IR); 57 Chuck Faucette LB (IR); 14 Dan Fouts QB (IR); 21 Nelson Jones S (IR); 51 Woodrow Lowe LB (IR); 73 Joe MacEsker T (IR); 91 Leslie O'Neal DE (IR); 66 Dan Rosado G (IR); 24 Kevin Scott RB (IR); 55 Johnny Taylor LB (IR); 84 Al Williams WR (IR); -- Blaise Winter NT (IR); Rookies in italics

== Preseason ==
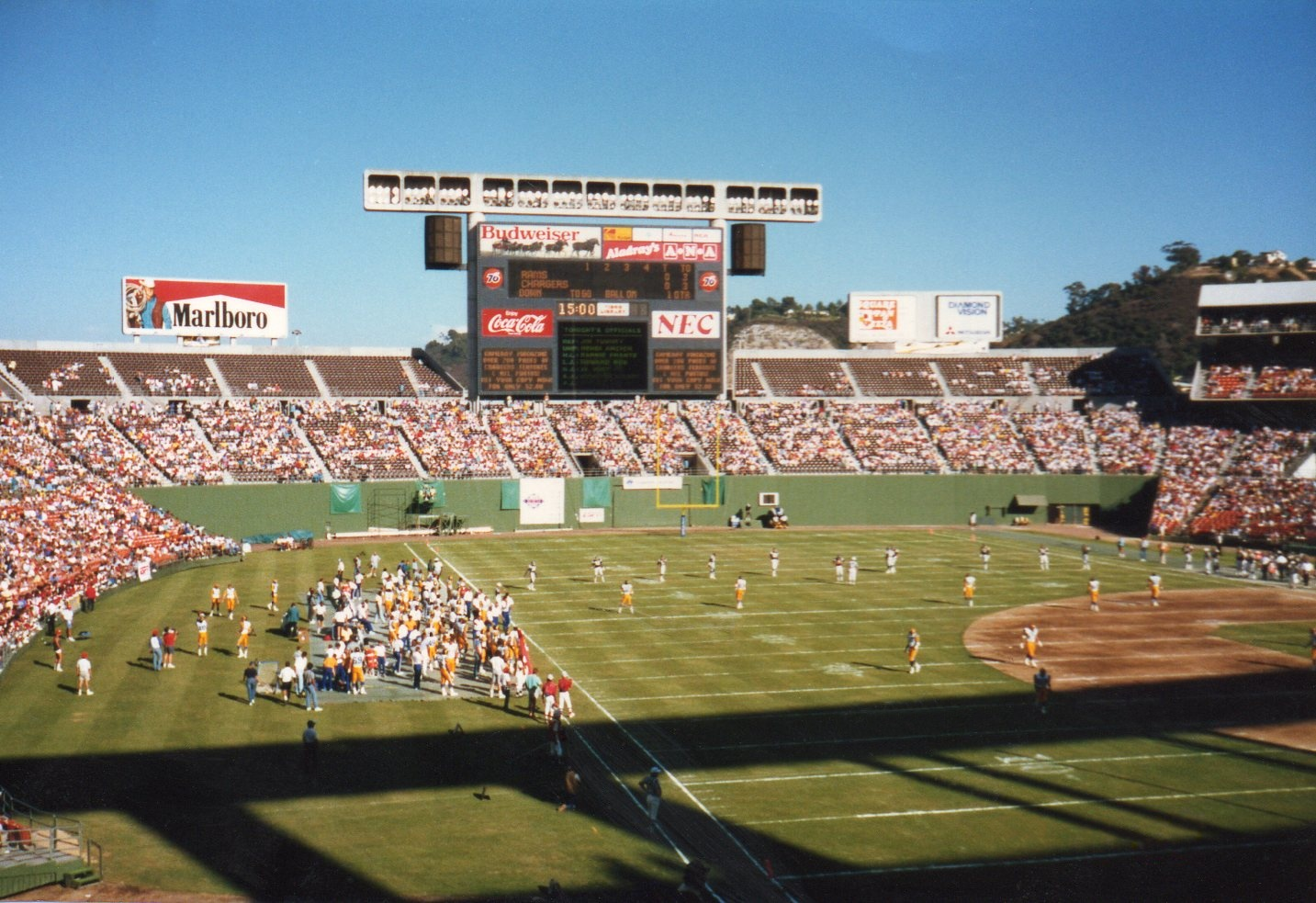
Jack Murphy Stadium during a preseason game between the Chargers and the Los Angeles Rams.

For the second consecutive season, the Chargers opened their preseason schedule by shutting out the Cowboys. They allowed only 11 first downs and 208 yards, while scoring on a Mark Herrmann touchdown pass to Lionel James and runs by Frank Middleton and Kevin Scott. In the following game, three different quarterbacks (Herrmann, Rick Neuheisel and Vlasic) threw touchdowns to three different receivers (Tim Spencer, Bernstine and Holland). The last of these put San Diego ahead 21–20 with 2:47 to play, but the Rams drove into position for a game-winning field goal with four seconds left.

Starting quarterback Dan Fouts hadn't played at all in the first two games. He did so at San Francisco, completing only 3 of 11 passes for 14 yards while getting sacked three times in a quarter of action, but leading the Chargers to their only points, an Abbott field goal. Fouts played into the 3rd quarter in the final game, leading three touchdown drives. He threw a 64-yard touchdown pass to Wes Chandler and a 1-yarder to Sam Claphan on a tackle-eligible play, before Spencer scored his second touchdown of the preseason on a 4-yard run.

Week	Date	Opponent	Result	Record	Venue	Attendance
1	August 15	Dallas Cowboys	W 29–0	1–0	Jack Murphy Stadium	48,020
2	August 23	Los Angeles Rams	L 21–23	1–1	Jack Murphy Stadium	45,433
3	August 27	at San Francisco 49ers	L 3–17	1–2	Candlestick Park	52,733
4	September 4	New York Jets	W 30–6	2–2	Jack Murphy Stadium	45,757

== Regular season ==
=== Overview ===
San Diego lost their opening game and won the next, leaving them at 1–1 heading into the players' strike (see following section). Their replacement players won all three of their games, before the regulars returned and extended the Charger winning streak to eight games in total, including seven wins by six points or fewer. At 8–1, San Diego had the best record in the NFL, and a two-game lead in the AFC West. However, they lost their remaining six games and missed the playoffs, being outscored 162–61 during the losing streak. As of 2022, the 1987 Chargers remain the only post-merger team to miss the playoffs after starting 8–1. On a 2012 episode of NFL Top 10, theirs was named the #5 worst single season collapse in NFL history.

A weak offense increasingly hampered the Chargers as the season wore on – they scored only seven offensive touchdowns in their final eight games. They finished the season ranked 27th out of 28 teams for points scored, and 21st for yards gained, while converting a league-worst 30% of their third downs. Fouts struggled with injuries, missing two non-strike games, and posted a passer rating of 70.0, below the league average of 75.2 and his worst for 12 years. Chandler led the team with 617 receiving yards, while James, Kellen Winslow and Gary Anderson had over 500 each. Winslow's 53 catches were the second most in the league for a tight end, earning him a fifth Pro Bowl appearance in his ninth and final season, though his yards per catch dropped to a career-low 9.8. While San Diego's passing yardage was the 8th-best in the league, their rushing yardage ranked 27th, and their average yards-per-carry of 3.3 ranked dead last. Curtis Adams led the team, but his 343 yards ranked only 44th in the league.

The defense was middling, finishing 15th in the NFL for both points conceded and yards allowed. This represented an improvements on recent years – San Diego had ranked 23rd or worse in both categories for six consecutive seasons. They were stronger against the pass than the run (4th-ranked vs. 24th-ranked). Defensive end Leslie O'Neal, who had been named AP Defensive Rookie of the Year the previous season, missed all of 1987 with an injury. In his absence, the team's sack total dropped from 62 to 45; Lee Williams repeated as sack leader, though his total dropped from 15 in 16 games to 8 in 12 games. Linebacker Billy Ray Smith led the team with 5 interceptions (he also had 3 sacks), while safety Vencie Glenn was second with 4, one of which he returned 103 yards for a touchdown. On special teams, James ranked fifth in the league with 12.5 yards per punt return, including a touchdown, while Anderson was 17th with 19.7 yards per kickoff return. New kicker Abbott made 13 of his first 17 field goals, but missed his last five attempts and finished 25th in the league with a 59.1% conversion rate. Punter Ralf Mojsiejenko averaged 42.9 yards per kick, earning the lone Pro Bowl nomination of his career.

=== NFLPA strike ===
==== The strike begins ====
The 1987 NFL season began under the shadow of a potential National Football League Players Association (NFLPA) strike, with the collective bargaining agreement set to expire and talks stalling as the players pushed for improved free agency rights. The NFLPA set a date of September 22 to strike, two weeks into the season; in response, the owners threatened to field replacement teams stocked with free agents. With this possibility in mind, San Diego was one of several teams who offered optional agreements to players they waived in the build-up to the season, allowing them to rejoin the Chargers in the event of a strike.

With no agreement having been reached, the strike went ahead as planned. Chandler, the Chargers' player representative, described the situation as disappointing, but derided existing free agency restrictions as a "form of slavery". Head coach Al Saunders sympathized with the fans and stated that he could see both sides of the disagreement. He noted that it was his job to coach replacement players if instructed to do so by the league. At a meeting with his players on the eve of the strike, Saunders encouraged them to continue to stay in shape; the players were in agreement, and scheduled group training sessions at the University of California, San Diego. All 45 regular Chargers refused to play for the team once the strike began. This included Fouts, who was not a member of the NFLPA union and stated that he did not consider himself to be on strike. He declined to play on a team stocked with replacement players, noting that he would be risking injury behind an inexperienced offensive line.

==== Forming the "Re-Chargers" ====
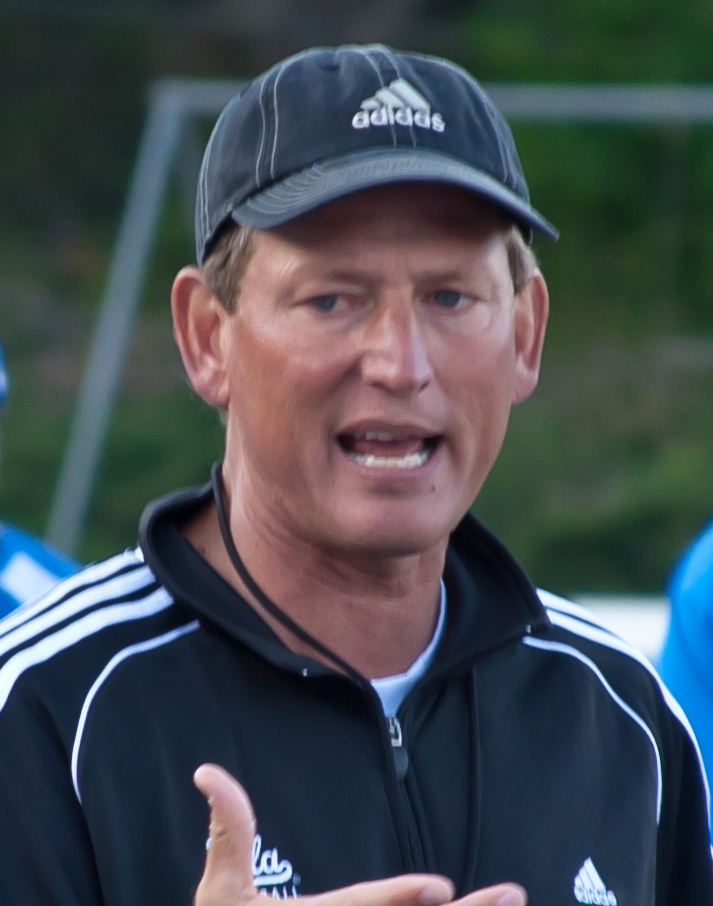
Rick Neuheisel, pictured in 2011. After lengthy deliberation, he joined the Chargers as their replacement quarterback. The three strike games of 1987 were the only appearances of his NFL career.

The NFL cancelled its slate of week 3 games, and proceeded to form teams of non-union players to replace the regulars from week 4 onwards; director of football operations Steve Ortmayer was primarily responsible for building the Chargers' replacement squad. On September 22, they announced the first 18 players in their new team, including eight they had cut in preseason. By the following day's first practice session, the squad had grown to 38, and 5 more appeared for a later session. While many of the new players had little or no NFL experience, cornerback Elvis Patterson had won the Super Bowl with the New York Giants; he had been released one game into the 1987 season after being badly beaten on a touchdown catch by Chicago Bears receiver Willie Gault. Patterson described his signing as a second chance, and expressed optimism that he could keep his place after the strike was over. At quarterback, the Chargers quickly signed Mike Kelley, formerly of the USFL, but since they also hoped to add someone familiar with their offensive scheme they approached Rick Neuheisel and Tom Flick, both of whom they had cut in training camp. Neuheisel struggled with the choice: on September 22, he decided to play, but changed his mind through loyalty to the striking players, and announced on September 23 that he would continue his studies at USC Law School instead. On September 28, Neuheisel met with both Charger officials and striking players to try and get both sides of the story; the following day, he reaffirmed his decision not to play. Finally, he agreed to sign with the Chargers on September 30, noting that some established NFL veterans had crossed the picket lines.

Many of the established players responded with hostility to their replacements. A group of 39 striking Chargers established a picket line at the new players' first practice session. They gathered on a hill overlooking the facility and jeered the performers throughout; Patterson was greeted with cries of "Where's Willie Gault?" Chandler stated that the real players were picketing, and their replacements were "stunt men". Linebacker Gary Plummer said that he couldn't blame the replacements for taking advantage of the situation, but that it was the picketers' job to give them a hard time. Saunders dubbed his new team the "Re-Chargers"; he acknowledged that they were below the regulars in terms of quality, but said, "there's still the thrill of coaching and there's still the challenge." Going into their first replacement game (week 4), the Chargers had seventeen players with NFL experience on their squad while their opponents, the Cincinnati Bengals, had two.

==== The replacement games ====
With the strike continuing, teams of mostly non-union players contested the NFL's slates of games in weeks 4 and 5; the replacement Chargers won both games, with none of the regulars involved. As the strike proceeded, increasing numbers of established stars crossing the picket lines; with the defections weakening their position, the NFLPA relented and called off the strike after 24 days, on October 15. This was one day too late for players to report for duty for week 6, giving the replacements one more game before the majority of them would lose their jobs. The regular Chargers turned up at Jack Murphy Stadium on October 16 ready to work; they were told by Ortmayer that they could use the club's facilities, but would not be paid or permitted to play that week, whereupon they left the building. One exception was defensive lineman Terry Unrein, who had contacted club management shortly before the deadline and indicated that he would cross the picket line. Two other players (Mack Moore and Jeffery Dale) re-joined the team but were listed on injured reserve and unable to play, so Unrein was the lone strike-breaker to appear for the Chargers in week 6. Despite their opponents (the Los Angeles Raiders) having several regulars available, the Chargers won again to complete a clean sweep of their strike games.

All three wins came on the road, and the Chargers trailed at halftime in each game. Neuheisel and Kelley split time at quarterback, with one replacing the other in each game – they finished with 672 combined yards (367 for Neuheisel, 305 for Kelley). The top receiver was Al Williams, with 12 catches for 247 yards and a touchdown; his yardage total was the 8th-highest in the league during the strike games. No rushers gained 100 yards or more, with Keyvan Jenkins' 88 yards leading the team. San Diego scored 50 points during the three games, 21st in the league; by contrast, they conceded only 39 points, fifth fewest in the league. Notable performers included Patterson, whose 75-yard interception return touchdown beat the Raiders in the final minute, and Blaise Winter, whose 4 sacks were tied for 3rd-most in the league during the strike games.

==== After the strike ====
A day after their non-union replacements beat the Raiders, the regular Chargers returned for their first practice at Jack Murphy Stadium. While Chandler described practising with the replacements as the biggest challenge for the returning Chargers, alternate player representative Gill Byrd praised their performances and stated that he expected no animosity between the two groups. When the Chargers beat the Kansas City Chiefs 42–21 in their first post-strike game, Chandler and Fouts were among several players who credited the result to team unity and the regular practice sessions the striking players had run together.

The Chargers quickly trimmed their list of non-union players once the regulars returned. On 20 October, they cut 35 replacement players, retaining 19 on their active roster and three more on injured reserve. A further seven were waived the following week, together with four members of the pre-strike squad, as NFL teams were given increasingly tight squad limits to meet. By 14 November, the pre-strike limit of 45 players had been restored, with nine replacement Chargers remaining. Patterson won a starting role in 1987, and remained with the team through the 1989 season, while Les Miller and Joe Phillips both started games for the Chargers as late as 1990.

==== List of replacement players ====
Click "show" to expand the table below, which displays brief career notes on the 50 replacement Chargers who featured in at least one strike game (Weeks 4, 5 and 6). Players who were on the Chargers' replacement squad but did not feature in any games are not included; neither is Unrein, a union player who crossed the picket lines and played in week 6. Players are taken to have pre-strike or post-strike experience in a league if they featured in at least one regular season or postseason game.

Replacement players
Name	No.	Position	College	Prior experience			Strike games			After strike		Career notes
Name	No.	Position	College	NFL	CFL	USFL	Week 4	Week 5	Week 6	NFL	CFL	Career notes
Anthony Anderson	24	DB	Grambling State	No	No	No	Yes	Yes	Yes	No	No	Rookie in 1987, drafted by Chargers in 10th round, waived on 29 August. Signed to strike team on 23 September. Credited with half a sack in week 6. Cut on 20 October.
Monte Bennett	69	DE	Kansas State	Yes	No	Yes	Yes	Yes	Yes	No	No	Started 6 games for the 1981 New Orleans Saints as an undrafted rookie, released before the 1982 season. Played for the USFL's Oakland Invaders from 1983–85. Signed by the Chargers on 28 May 1987, but cut on 7 September. Signed to strike team on 23 September. Cut again after strike games, on 20 October.
Ed Berry	38	CB	Utah State	Yes	No	No	Yes	Yes	No	No	Yes	7th-round draft pick; played for the 1986 Green Bay Packers as a rookie; cut on 7 September 1987. Signed to Chargers' strike team on 22 September. Missed week 6 with hamstring injury. Cut on 20 October. Played in the CFL from 1988–96, scored in the 1991 Grey Cup win; won second Canadian title in 1996.
Carl Brazley	48	S	Western Kentucky	No	Yes	No	No	Yes	Yes	No	Yes	Spent seven years in the CFL (1980–86). Signed for the Chargers on 28 May 1987, but cut on 26 August after an error in a preseason game. Signed to strike team on 23 September. Had an interception in week 5. Cut on 20 October. Returned to Canada for a further five seasons (1988–92). Grey Cup winner in 1983 and 1991.
Bruce Davis	83	WR	Baylor	Yes	No	No	Yes	No	No	No	No	2nd-round pick for Cleveland in 1984 draft; used primarily as a kickoff returner in his rookie year. Waived on 30 August 1985. Released by the CFL's Calgary Stampeders on 3 June 1987 and the Chargers on 26 August. Signed to strike team on 23 September. Registered no statistics during his lone appearance. Cut on 20 October.
David Diaz-Infante	63	C	San Jose State	No	No	No	Yes	Yes	Yes	Yes	Yes	Undrafted rookie in 1987, waived by Chargers on 29 August. Signed to strike team on 22 September. Was long snapper for a game-winning field goal in week 4. Subsequently played in the WLAF, CFL, NFL and XFL. Won two Super Bowls (XXXII and XXXIII) with the Broncos as their long snapper.
Chuck Faucette	57	LB	Maryland	No	No	No	Yes	Yes	No	Yes	No	Rookie in 1987, drafted by Giants in the 10th round, waived on 7 September. Signed to Chargers' strike team on 2 October. Missed third strike game with knee injury. Retained on injured reserve list after strike ended. Started the first eight games for San Diego in 1988, but a fractured vertebra in his neck ended his career.
Greg Feasel	67	T	Abilene Christian	Yes	No	Yes	Yes	Yes	Yes	No	No	Cut in preseason by three different NFL teams before playing for the USFL's Denver Gold for three seasons (1983–85). Played in 15 games for the 1986 Green Bay Packers, then traded on 31 August 1987 to the Oilers, who waived him a week later. After strike games, cut by Chargers on 27 October.
Kevin Ferguson	87	TE	Virginia	No	No	No	Yes	Yes	Yes	No	No	Undrafted rookie in 1987, signed by Chargers on 25 July. Waived on 26 August. Signed to strike team on 23 September. Caught no passes in his three games, cut on 20 October and did not play again.
Jeff Gaffney	4	K	Virginia	No	No	No	Yes	Yes	Yes	No	No	Undrafted rookie in 1987, signed by Chargers on 27 May. Lost training camp battle to Abbott. Signed to strike team on 22 September. Made a late game-winning field goal in week 4. Overall, made 3 of 6 field goals and 4 of 5 extra points; cut on 20 October and did not play again.
Joe Goebel	68	C	UCLA	No	No	No	No	Yes	Yes	No	No	Rookie in 1987, drafted by Chargers in 10th round, Retired on 27 July to become a pilot, without having attended training camp. Signed to strike team on 28 September. Cut on 20 October.
Willard Goff	76	DT	West Texas A&M	Yes	No	No	Yes	No	No	No	No	Featured in 7 games for the 1985 Atlanta Falcons as an undrafted rookie; waived on 26 August 1986. Spent time with both the Raiders and 49ers during the 1987 preseason. Signed to Chargers' strike team on 22 September; cut on 20 October and did not play again.
Walt Harris	46	S	Stanford	No	No	No	Yes	Yes	Yes	No	No	Played minor league baseball in 1986. On the Chargers' roster during the 1987 preseason, but cut on 7 September. Signed to strike team on 22 September. Recovered a fumble in week 6. Cut on 27 October. Returned to minor league baseball for three more seasons (1988–90).
Harry Holt	85	TE	Arizona	Yes	Yes	No	Yes	Yes	Yes	No	No	Two CFL All-Star nominations in five season with BC Lions. Signed for Cleveland in 1983; caught 63 passes for 837 yards and 5 touchdowns; released on 12 August 1987. Briefly on Packers' roster. Signed to Chargers' strike team on 29 September. Caught 7 passes for 56 yards. Cut on 20 October.
Darrel Hopper	47	CB	USC	No	No	No	Yes	Yes	Yes	Yes	Yes	Undrafted rookie in 1985. Preseason cut for Seattle in 1985 and Edmonton in 1987. Signed by Chargers on 29 July; waived on 26 August. Signed to strike team on 22 September. Cut on 27 October, but briefly returned for one further game (Week 11). Played for CFL's Ottawa Rough Riders in 1989–90.
Mike Hudson	28	S	Oklahoma State	No	No	No	Yes	Yes	Yes	No	No	Undrafted rookie in 1987. Spent time with Tampa Bay in training camp, but released on 27 July. Failed physical with Minnesota due to pneumonia. Signed to Chargers' strike team on 23 September. Cut on 20 October.
Mike Humiston	50	LB	Weber State	Yes	No	No	Yes	Yes	Yes	Yes	No	Made the 1981 Bills’ squad as an undrafted rookie. Waived in 1982; was with the Colts from 1982 to 1984, but missed all of 1983 due to injury. Waived on 20 August 1985. Joined the Arizona Outlaws but did not play for them as the USFL ceased operations in 1986. Was a deputy sheriff before being signed to the Chargers' strike team on 28 September 1987. Retained for a month after the strike, recovering a key fumble in week 9. Waived on 25 November.
Brian Ingram	52	LB	Tennessee	Yes	No	No	Yes	No	No	No	No	4th-round pick for New England in 1982 draft; played little during his first four seasons. Missed entire 1986 season with knee injury. Waived by Patriots on 7 September 1987. Signed to Chargers' strike team on 28 September. Sustained a hamstring injury in week 4; placed on injured reserve, then released on 25 November.
Jeff Jackson	52	LB	Auburn	Yes	No	No	Yes	Yes	Yes	Yes	Yes	8th-round pick for Atlanta in 1984 draft; featured in 27 games, then waived on 18 August 1986. Signed by Chargers on 23 April 1987; cut on 7 September. Signed to strike team on 23 September. Credited with a sack in week 6. Retained through the 1988 season totalling 25 appearances and 7 starts; waived on 29 August 1989. Played in CFL from 1991–93.
Keyvan Jenkins	39	FB	UNLV	Yes	Yes	No	Yes	Yes	Yes	Yes	Yes	Spent three years in the CFL (1984–86). Signed for the Chargers on 12 May 1987, but waived on 26 August. Signed to strike team on 23 September. Rushed 22 times for 88 yards, and caught 8 passes for 40 yards. Featured in two games for the 1988 Kansas City Chiefs, but eventually returned to Canada for a further five seasons (1990–94). Grey Cup winner in 1985 and 1992.
James Johnson	57	LB	San Diego State	Yes	No	No	Yes	No	Yes	No	No	4th-round draft pick for the 1986 Lions; featured in 11 games as a rookie, but started none. Waived on 1 September 1987. Joined San Francisco strike team and played for 49ers in week 4. Traded to San Diego on 13 October and played for Chargers in week 6. Cut on 20 October.
Mike Kelley	10	QB	Georgia Tech	No	Yes	Yes	Yes	Yes	Yes	No	No	6th-round pick for Atlanta in 1982 draft; cut in preseason. Spent three seasons in the USFL (1983–85), mostly with Memphis Showboats, and 1986 in the CFL. Signed to Chargers' strike team on 23 September. Passed for 305 yards in total, with one touchdown. Cut on 20 October. Joined CFL's Memphis Mad Dogs in 1995; cut in preseason and retired.
Randy Kirk	94	LB	San Diego State	No	No	No	Yes	Yes	Yes	Yes	No	Undrafted rookie in 1987, waived by Giants on 1 September. Signed to strike team on 22 September. Had the only start and only sack of his career in week 6. Stayed with the Chargers through the 1988 season and returned for part of 1991; overall, played in 157 games for six different NFL teams in a 13-year career (1987–99), serving mainly as a long snapper.
Frank Middleton	30	RB	Florida A&M	No	Yes	Yes	Yes	Yes	Yes	No	No	Undrafted, preseason cut for 1983 Seahawks. Played for Colts in 1984 and 1985. Preseason cut for Buccaneers in 1986. Joined Chargers in 1987, waived on 8 September. Signed to strike team on 28 September. Rushed for 61 yards and a touchdown in week 4, but only 13 yards afterwards. Cut on 20 October.
Les Miller	75	DE	Fort Hays State	Yes	No	No	Yes	Yes	Yes	Yes	No	Undrafted rookie in 1987, cut from Saints' squad on 7 September. Worked in a factory for $5 per hour before being signed to the Chargers' strike team; retained his place on the team after the strike ended, and scored on a fumble recovery the following week. Stayed with the Chargers through the 1990 season, and returned to San Diego for part of 1994. Overall, had 152 appearances, 51 starts and 20 sacks during a 12-year NFL career.
Pat Miller	52	LB	Florida	No	No	No	No	No	Yes	Yes	Yes	5th-round pick for 49ers in 1986 draft; cut in preseason. Joined Raiders in 1987 offseason, but cut on 7 September. Signed to Chargers' strike team on 13 October. After strike, released on 27 October. Re-signed by Chargers on 22 February 1988; played in 8 games that season. Played for Ottawa in 1989–90.
Tim Moffett	86	WR	Mississippi	Yes	No	No	Yes	Yes	Yes	No	No	3rd-round pick for Raiders in 1985 draft. Caught 11 passes in two seasons; waived on 1 September 1987. Signed to strike team on 23 September. Totalled 5 catches for 80 yards and a touchdown. Cut on 20 October.
Calvin Muhammad	81	WR	Texas Southern	Yes	Yes	No	No	Yes	Yes	No	No	12th-round pick for Raiders in 1982 draft; won Super Bowl XVIII in his second year. Traded to Washington and posted over 700 receiving yards in only 10 games, but less productive in 1985. Spent part of 1987 in Toronto while struggling with injuries; released on 18 September. Signed to strike team on 23 September. Caught 2 passes for 87 yards. Cut on 20 October.
Rick Neuheisel	7	QB	UCLA	No	No	Yes	Yes	Yes	Yes	No	No	Started a total of 32 games for the USFL's San Antonio Gunslingers over 1984 and 1985. Joined Chargers on 24 April 1987; cut on 7 September. Initially declined offer to join replacement team, but signed on 30 September. Threw for 367 yards, with a touchdown and an interception; also ran for a touchdown. Cut on 27 October.
Elvis Patterson	34	CB	Kansas	Yes	No	No	Yes	Yes	Yes	Yes	No	Undrafted free agent signed to 1984 Giants roster; started on their Super Bowl-winning team two seasons later. Cut by New York after their 1987 opener. Signed to Chargers' strike team on 22 September. Scored game-winning touchdown in week 6. Remained in San Diego through the 1989 season; finished career in 1993 with Super Bowl XXVIII-winning Cowboys.
Duane Pettitt	93	DE	San Diego	No	No	No	Yes	Yes	Yes	No	No	Undrafted rookie in 1987, signed by Chargers on 5 May. Waived on 26 August. Signed to strike team on 22 September. Cut on 20 October. Named one of the league's best replacement defensive linemen by The St. Lucie News-Tribune.
Joe Phillips	75	DE	SMU	Yes	No	No	Yes	Yes	Yes	Yes	No	4th-round pick for Vikings in 1986 draft; started one game as a rookie. Cut on 7 September 1987. Signed to Chargers' strike team on 23 September. Had two sacks during the strike games. Retained after the strike ended. Stayed with Chargers through 1991 season; went on to have 14-year NFL career, with 200 appearances, 152 starts and 24 1/2 sacks.
Jeff Powell	31	RB	Tennessee	No	No	No	No	Yes	No	No	No	4th-round draft pick for the 1986 Bears; cut on 19 August. Signed for Chargers on 12 March 1987; cut on 18 August. Signed to strike team on 22 September. Had no carries in his single game. Cut on 20 October.
Stacy Price	53	LB	Arkansas State	No	No	No	Yes	Yes	Yes	No	No	Undrafted rookie in 1987, cut from Ottawa's squad in preseason. Signed to Chargers' strike team on 23 September. Cut after strike games, on 20 October.
Joe Prokop	8	P	Cal Poly-Pomona	Yes	No	No	Yes	Yes	Yes	No	No	Undrafted in 1984; first started for the 1985 Packers. Cut midseason after disappointing performances. Signed for Chargers on 13 April 1987; cut on 15 September. Signed to strike team on 22 September. Punted 17 times at an average of 38.5 yards. Cut on 20 October. Punted for four different teams from 1988–92.
Tag Rome	82	WR	ULM	No	Yes	No	Yes	Yes	Yes	No	No	Played for two different CFL teams from 1984–86. Signed for Chargers on 12 March 1987; waived on 29 August. Signed to strike team on 28 September. Caught 6 passes for 49 yards. Cut on 20 October.
Dan Rosado	66	G	Northern Illinois	No	Yes	No	Yes	Yes	Yes	No	No	Graduated from college in 1979, but didn't play professional football until 1985 with the USFL's Houston Gamblers. Cut by the Dolphins in preseason in both 1986 and 1987. Signed to Chargers' strike team on 23 September. Retained and played in week 7, then moved to injured reserve. Played in 12 games in 1988, starting in 11. Cut on 26 August 1989.
Curtis Rouse	77	T	Chattanooga	Yes	No	No	Yes	Yes	Yes	Yes	No	11th-round pick for Minnesota in 1982 draft; played in 58 games and started 29 during five seasons with the Vikings. Cut on 7 September 1987. Signed to Chargers' strike team on 30 September. Played in seven further games after the strike. Traded to Atlanta in 1988 due to a lack of fitness; the Falcons cut him on 11 August, and he did not play again.
Martin Sartin	35	RB	Long Beach State	No	No	No	Yes	Yes	Yes	No	Yes	Undrafted rookie in 1986; signed for the Raiders but spent the entire year on injured reserve; cut on 1 September. Signed to Chargers' strike team on 23 September. Had 19 carries for 52 yards and a touchdown. Cut on 20 October. Played for the CFL's Hamilton Tiger Cats in 1988.
King Simmons	41	S	Texas Tech	No	No	No	Yes	Yes	Yes	No	Yes	12th-round pick for Browns in 1986 draft; Spent the entire year on injured reserve; cut on 1 September 1987. Signed to Chargers' strike team on 23 September. Had 1 1/2 sacks across the three games. Cut on 20 October. Played for the CFL's Hamilton Tiger Cats in 1988.
Tony Simmons	97	DE	Tennessee	Yes	No	No	Yes	Yes	Yes	No	Yes	12th round pick for the Chargers in 1985; featured in 13 games during his rookie season. Spent 1986 on injured reserve; waived on 29 August 1987. Signed to strike team on 23 September. Credited with a sack in week 6. Cut on 20 October. Played for BC Lions in 1989 and 1990.
Emil Slovacek	72	T	Stephen F. Austin	No	No	No	Yes	Yes	No	No	No	Undrafted rookie in 1987, signed for the Chargers on 5 May. Cut on 26 August. Signed to the strike team in September, but deactivated before the third game.
Todd Spencer	32	RB	USC	Yes	No	No	Yes	Yes	Yes	No	No	Undrafted; signed by Steelers and used mainly as a kickoff returner in 1984 and 1985. Allowed to become a free agent in February 1986; did not play the following season. Signed to strike team on 23 September. Rushed 14 times for 24 yards and caught 2 passes for 47 yards. Cut on 20 October.
John Stadnik	65	C	Western Illinois	No	No	Yes	Yes	Yes	Yes	No	No	Undrafted in the NFL; cut by Seahawks on 18 July 1983. Played for two different Arizona-based USFL franchises in 1984 and 1985. Signed for Chargers on 13 April 1987; waived on 29 August. Signed to strike team on 23 September. Cut again on 20 October.
Anthony Steels	45	RB	Nebraska	Yes	No	Yes	Yes	No	Yes	No	No	Played for the USFL's Breakers franchise in 1983 and 1984. Played for both the Chargers (who placed him on waivers midseason) and the Bills in 1985, acting mainly as a kickoff returner. Cut by Bills on 11 August 1986. Signed to Chargers' strike team on 23 September. Registered 1 rush for 3 yards and 1 catch for 4 yards. Cut on 20 October.
Johnny Taylor	55	LB	Hawaii	Yes	No	No	Yes	Yes	Yes	No	No	Played in 2 late-season games for the 1984 Atlanta Falcons as an undrafted rookie and 15 the following season. Cut midseason in 1986 and signed by Miami; placed on injured reserve after one game and released soon afterwards. Signed to Chargers' strike team on 23 September. Retained for four games after strike; injured in the last of these. Released on 22 August 1988.
Dwight Wheeler	71	G	Tennessee State	Yes	No	No	Yes	Yes	Yes	Yes	No	4th-round pick for New England in 1978 draft; spent six years with the Patriots, then featured in four games for the 1984 Raiders. Cut in preseason by Los Angeles for three straight years (1985–87). Signed by Chargers on 18 September 1987, before their week 2 game, but featured only in the strike games. Cut on 27 October. Played for the Raiders in 1987–88.
Al Williams	84	WR	Nevada	No	No	Yes	Yes	Yes	Yes	No	Yes	Undrafted; played for the USFL's Outlaws franchise for two seasons (1984–85). Made 1986 Lions squad, but cut midseason without playing. Waived by both Chargers and Saints in 1987. Signed to Chargers' strike team on 23 September. Caught 12 passes for 247 yards and a touchdown. Remained on the roster until August 1988, but did not play for the Chargers again. Played for the CFL's Hamilton Tiger Cats in 1989.
Blaise Winter	96	NT	Syracuse	Yes	No	No	Yes	Yes	Yes	Yes	No	2nd-round draft pick for the 1984 Colts; voted to All-Rookie team. Missed all of 1985 and the start of 1986 through injury; cut midseason and signed by Chargers, playing four games. Waived on 29 August 1987. Signed to strike team on 23 September. Posted 4 sacks in three games, then placed on injured reserve and traded to the Packers, with whom he spent 1988–90. Returned to San Diego for 1992–94. Finished 11-year NFL career with 300 tackles and 21 sacks.
Ken Zachary	33	RB	Oklahoma State	No	Yes	No	Yes	Yes	Yes	No	Yes	Undrafted in the NFL; spent 1986 and 1987 with the CFL's Hamilton Tiger Cats. Dropped to the practice squad during his second season. Signed to Chargers' strike team on 23 September. Rushed once for 3 yards (losing a fumble), and returned a kickoff for 2 yards. Cut on 20 October. Returned to Hamilton for one further season (1988).

=== Schedule ===
Week	Date	Opponent	Result	Record	Venue	Attendance	Recap
1	September 13	at **Kansas City Chiefs**	**L** 13–20	0–1	Arrowhead Stadium	56,940	Recap
2	September 20	St. Louis Cardinals	**W** 28–24	1–1	Jack Murphy Stadium	47,988	Recap
3	September 27	**Seattle Seahawks**	cancelled	1–1	Jack Murphy Stadium	NFL Players Strike	
4	October 4	at Cincinnati Bengals	**W** 10–9	2–1	Riverfront Stadium	26,209	Recap
5	October 11	at Tampa Bay Buccaneers	**W** 17–13	3–1	Tampa Stadium	23,873	Recap
6	October 18	at **Los Angeles Raiders**	**W** 23–17	4–1	Los Angeles Memorial Coliseum	23,541	Recap
7	October 25	**Kansas City Chiefs**	**W** 42–21	5–1	Jack Murphy Stadium	47,972	Recap
8	November 1	Cleveland Browns	**W** 27–24 (OT)	6–1	Jack Murphy Stadium	55,381	Recap
9	November 8	at Indianapolis Colts	**W** 16–13	7–1	Hoosier Dome	60,459	Recap
10	November 15	**Los Angeles Raiders**	**W** 16–14	8–1	Jack Murphy Stadium	60,639	Recap
11	November 22	at **Seattle Seahawks**	**L** 3–34	8–2	Kingdome	62,444	Recap
12	November 29	**Denver Broncos**	**L** 17–31	8–3	Jack Murphy Stadium	61,880	Recap
13	December 6	at Houston Oilers	**L** 18–33	8–4	Houston Astrodome	31,714	Recap
14	December 13	Pittsburgh Steelers	**L** 16–20	8–5	Jack Murphy Stadium	51,605	Recap
15	December 20	Indianapolis Colts	**L** 7–20	8–6	Jack Murphy Stadium	46,211	Recap
16	December 27	at **Denver Broncos**	**L** 0–24	8–7	Mile High Stadium	21,189	Recap
Note: Intra-division opponents are in **bold** text.

=== Game summaries ===
All game reports use the Pro Football Researchers' gamebook archive as a source.

==== Week 1: at Kansas City Chiefs ====
Week 1: San Diego Chargers at Kansas City Chiefs – Game summary

Quarter	1	2	3	4	Total
Chargers	0	0	3	10	**13**
**Chiefs**	3	7	0	10	**20**

at Arrowhead Stadium, Kansas City, Missouri

- Date: September 13
- Game time: 12:00 p.m. CDT
- Game weather: 65 °F (18.3 °C), relative humidity 70%, wind 9 mph
- Game attendance: 56,940
- Referee: Pat Haggerty
- TV announcers (NBC): Gary Gerould and Sam Rutigliano
- Box score

Game information

**First quarter**

- KAN – Nick Lowery 25-yard field goal, 1:23. Chiefs 3–0. **Drive: 12 plays, 46 yards, 6:10.**

**Second quarter**

- KAN – Christian Okoye 45-yard run (Nick Lowery kick), 2:56. Chiefs 10–0. **Drive: 6 plays, 80 yards, 3:14.**

**Third quarter**

- SDG – Vince Abbott 32-yard field goal, 7:47. Chiefs 10–3. **Drive: 14 plays, 72 yards, 7:13.**

**Fourth quarter**

- KAN – Nick Lowery 29-yard field goal, 12:45. Chiefs 13–3. **Drive: 12 plays, 63 yards, 5:48.**
- SDG – Gary Anderson 34-yard pass from Dan Fouts (Vince Abbott kick), 7:37. Chiefs 13–10. **Drive: 6 plays, 77 yards, 1:35.**
- SDG – Vince Abbott 33-yard field goal, 3:37. Tie 13–13. **Drive: 7 plays, 15 yards, 2:57.**
- KAN – Paul Palmer 85-yard kickoff return (Nick Lowery kick), 3:19. Chiefs 20–13.

**Top passers**

- SDG – Dan Fouts – 21/39, 270 yards, TD, 2 INT
- KAN – Todd Blackledge – 6/15, 79 yards, INT

**Top rushers**

- SDG – Gary Anderson – 12 rushes, 43 yards
- KAN – Christian Okoye – 21 rushes, 105 yards, TD

**Top receivers**

- SDG – Lionel James – 6 receptions, 100 yards
- KAN – Stephone Paige – 2 receptions, 29 yards

San Diego gave up a late kickoff return touchdown after rallying from a 10-point 4th-quarter deficit. The Chargers turned the ball over twice in the opening eight minutes; James fumbled a punt and Fouts threw an interception to Deron Cherry, with the Chiefs converting the second turnover into a field goal. In the 2nd quarter, the Chargers reached a 2nd and 6 at the Kansas City 14, but Cherry produced another interception, this time in the end zone. Kansas City then drove 80 yards and extended their lead, with rookie Christian Okoye breaking away on a 43-yard touchdown run. The Chiefs led 10–0 at halftime.

The Chargers opened the 3rd quarter with a 14-play, 72-yard drive, featuring a 27-yard catch by Winslow. They reached a 1st and goal at the 2, but were pushed back by a Dennis McKnight false start, and had to settle for an Abbott field goal. Abbott missed from 44 yards out on the next Charger drive, and Kansas City responded with a successful kick by Nick Lowery. Midway through the final quarter, San Diego got their lone touchdown of the game when Anderson caught a Fouts pass near the right sideline and barely stayed in bounds before completing a 34-yard touchdown catch. Two plays later, Plummer intercepted Todd Blackledge, setting his team up at the opposition 30. The Chargers drove to the 5, but Anderson was ruled out of bounds in the end zone on an attempted 3rd-down catch, and they settled for a game-tying field goal. Paul Palmer, another Chiefs rookie, returned the ensuing kickoff untouched for a 95-yard touchdown with 3:19 to play. The Chargers then went three-and-out. They nearly had one more opportunity, but Danny Walters was unable to come up with a tipped Blackledge pass, which was instead caught by Stephone Paige for the first down that allowed Kansas City to run out the clock.

Smith had 2 of the Chargers' 4 sacks. They allowed only 58 net passing yards, compared to their own total of 258, but lost the turnover count 4–1. James finished with 6 catches for 100 yards.

==== Week 2: vs. St. Louis Cardinals ====
Week Two: St. Louis Cardinals at San Diego Chargers – Game summary

Quarter	1	2	3	4	Total
Cardinals	0	0	10	14	**24**
Chargers	14	14	0	0	**28**

at Jack Murphy Stadium, San Diego, California

- Date: September 20
- Game time: 1:00 p.m. PDT
- Game weather: 69 °F (20.6 °C), relative humidity 82%, wind 10 mph
- Game attendance: 47,988
- Referee: Jim Tunney
- TV announcers (CBS): Jack Buck and Will McDonough
- Box score

Game information

**First quarter**

- SDG – Lionel James 81-yard punt return (Vince Abbott kick), 12:25. Chargers 7–0.
- SDG – Gary Anderson 5-yard run (Vince Abbott kick), 9:36. Chargers 14–0. **Drive: 4 plays, 15 yards, 1:51.**

**Second quarter**

- SDG – Wes Chandler 26-yard pass from Dan Fouts (Vince Abbott kick), 10:44. Chargers 21–0. **Drive: 11 plays, 80 yards, 5:25.**
- SDG – Lionel James 7-yard run (Vince Abbott kick), 1:28. Chargers 28–0. **Drive: 1 play, 7 yards, 0:06.**

**Third quarter**

- STL – Roy Green 8-yard pass from Neil Lomax (Jim Gallery kick), 6:43. Chargers 28–7. **Drive: 3 plays, 26 yards, 1:59.**
- STL – Jim Gallery 38 yard field goal, 1:02. Chargers 28–10. **Drive: 10 plays, 30 yards, 5:00.**

**Fourth quarter**

- STL – Jay Novacek 21-yard pass from Neil Lomax (Jim Gallery kick), 7:25. Chargers 28–17. **Drive: 6 plays, 80 yards, 3:54.**
- STL – Stump Mitchell 17-yard pass from Neil Lomax (Jim Gallery kick), 1:48. Chargers 28–24. **Drive: 10 plays, 80 yards, 1:53.**

**Top passers**

- STL – Neil Lomax – 32/61, 457 yards, 3 TD, INT
- SDG – Dan Fouts – 13/19, 152 yards, TD, INT

**Top rushers**

- STL – Stump Mitchell – 13 rushes, 42 yards
- SDG – Gary Anderson – 19 rushes, 79 yards, TD

**Top receivers**

- STL – Roy Green – 7 receptions, 139 yards, TD
- SDG – Wes Chandler – 5 receptions, 77 yards, TD

After taking a 28-point halftime lead, the Chargers barely hung on to win thanks to a late drop at the goal line. The Cardinals went three-and-out on the game's opening possession, and James profited from a block by Glenn en route to an 81-yard punt return touchdown. Three plays later, Neil Lomax fumbled the snap, and Smith recovered at the Cardinal 15. Anderson scored four plays later, and it was 14–0 only 5:24 into the game. Later, Fouts led an 11-play, 80-yard touchdown drive, capped by a 26-yard touchdown pass to Chandler. Late in the half, Smith intercepted Lomax, and James scored from the 7 on the next play. St. Louis reached the Charger 5 before running out of time, leaving the Chargers up 28–0 at the break.

Anderson had a 25-yard run and a 17-yard catch on the opening possession of the second half, but he then fumbled a pitch on 1st and goal from the 10, and St. Louis recovered. The Cardinals were forced to punt, but Fouts was soon intercepted in his own territory to begin the comeback. St. Louis scored 24 points on four consecutive possession, with Lomax throwing three touchdowns. San Diego answered with a punt each time, the final one of which was run back to the Charger 32 with 1:15 to play. Catches by Jay Novacek and Earl Ferrell moved the ball to the 5 yard line, from where Lomax threw three incompletions, bring up 4th and goal with 20 seconds to play. Due to an error by Smith, Ferrell was open to the right, but he dropped Lomax's pass at the goal line and the Chargers held on to win. Despite the victory, the home crowd booed the team off the field.

Lomax was sacked by five different players, but passed for 457 yards, then a record against the Chargers. San Diego only ran 56 plays, against 86 by the Cardinals.

==== Week 3: vs. Seattle Seahawks (cancelled) ====
All week 3 games were cancelled due to the NFLPA strike.

==== Week 4: at Cincinnati Bengals ====
Week Four: San Diego Chargers at Cincinnati Bengals – Game summary

Quarter	1	2	3	4	Total
Chargers	0	0	0	10	**10**
Bengals	7	2	0	0	**9**

at Riverfront Stadium, Cincinnati, Ohio

- Date: October 4
- Game time: 1:00 p.m. EDT
- Game weather: 45 °F (7.2 °C), relative humidity 55%, wind 8 mph
- Game attendance: 26,209
- Referee: Gordon McCarter
- TV announcers (NBC): Gary Gerould and Joe Namath
- Box score

Game information

**First quarter**

- CIN – Wade Russell 4-yard pass from Adrian Breen (Massimo Manca kick), 0:54. Bengals 7–0. **Drive: 4 plays, 63 yards, 1:45.**

**Second quarter**

- CIN – Safety, Scott Schutt tackled Rick Neuheisel in end zone, 7:09. Bengals 9–0.

**Third quarter**

- No scoring plays.

**Fourth quarter**

- SDG – Frank Middleton 1-yard run (Rick Neuheisel run), 11:18. Bengals 9–7. **Drive: 8 plays, 86 yards, 2:16.**
- SDG – Jeff Gaffney 24-yard field goal, 2:44. Chargers 10–9. **Drive: 7 plays, 35 yards, 3:06.**

**Top passers**

- SDG – Mike Kelley – 7/9, 110 yards
- CIN – Adrian Breen – 3/5, 9 yards, TD

**Top rushers**

- SDG – Frank Middleton – 16 rushes, 61 yards, TD
- CIN – Marc Logan – 14 rushes, 95 yards

**Top receivers**

- SDG – Al Williams – 5 receptions, 73 yards
- CIN – Greg Meehan – 1 reception, 6 yards

The replacement Chargers won their first game after being held scoreless for over three quarters. Todd Spencer fumbled on their first offensive play, though he recovered the ball himself. On the next possession, a 23-yard catch by Al Williams positioned them for a 30-yard field goal attempt that Jeff Gaffney missed wide left. San Diego soon moved back into Bengals territory, but Ken Zachary lost a fumble. Marc Logan then had a 51-yard run, leading to a Cincinnati touchdown two plays later. In the 2nd quarter, the Chargers had a 3rd and 12 from their own 18 and Neuheisel was sacked back in the end zone for a safety. Darrel Hopper blocked a Bengals' field goal try on the ensuing drive, and San Diego took over at the Cincinnati 45. Neuheisel then connected with Williams for 18 yards, but was intercepted two plays later, and the Bengals led 9–0 at halftime.

Cincinnati drove to a 4th and 1 at the San Diego 23 late in the 3rd quarter; the Bengals tried to run for the first down, but were stopped for no gain. Kelley was then inserted at quarterback. His first possession was a three-and-out, but his second was an 8-play, 86-yard touchdown drive: Spencer took a pass 45 yards for the biggest play, and Frank Middleton leapt over the line to score from the 1 two plays later. On the extra point attempt, a bad snap by Dwight Wheeler eluded the holder (Neuheisel). Gaffney picked up the loose ball and ran to the left; confronted by several Bengals, he pitched the ball back to Neuheisel, who headed to the right and dove in from a yard out, pulling the deficit back to 9–7 with eleven minutes to play. After the next three drives ended in punts, Williams had a 15-yard catch to help position Gaffney for a 24-yard field goal, with David Diaz-Infante replacing Wheeler as the long snapper. Gaffney converted the kick with under three minutes left. The Bengals opted to punt after gaining 6 yards on three plays, and Middleton ran for two first downs to help San Diego run out the clock.

Neuheisel completed 10 of 19 passes for 84 yards and an interception; Kelley completed 7 of 9 for 110 yards. The Chargers defense allowed −13 passing yards (the Bengals' quarterbacks had 10 passing yards, and lost 23 yards from 3 sacks); this remains a franchise record as of 2022.

==== Week 5: at Tampa Bay Buccaneers ====
Week Five: San Diego Chargers at Tampa Bay Buccaneers – Game summary

Quarter	1	2	3	4	Total
Chargers	0	0	10	7	**17**
Buccaneers	7	3	0	3	**13**

at Tampa Stadium, Tampa Bay, Florida

- Date: October 11
- Game time: 1:00 p.m. EDT
- Game weather: 75 °F (23.9 °C), relative humidity 83%, wind 13 mph
- Game attendance: 23,873
- Referee: Gene Barth
- TV announcers (NBC): Sam Nover and Dave Casper
- Box score

Game information

**First quarter**

- TB – Eric Streater 26-yard pass from John Reaves (Van Tiffin kick), 10:57. Buccaneers 7–0. **Drive: 2 plays, 28 yards, 0:43.**

**Second quarter**

- TB – Van Tiffin 41-yard field goal, 0:37. Buccaneers 10–0. **Drive: 7 plays, 28 yards, 3:41.**

**Third quarter**

- SDG – Jeff Gaffney 27-yard field goal, 10:02. Buccaneers 10–3. **Drive: 11 plays, 66 yards, 4:58.**
- SDG – Martin Sartin 2-yard run (Jeff Gaffney kick), 3:13. Tied 10–10. **Drive: 9 plays, 80 yards, 4:11.**

**Fourth quarter**

- SDG – Tim Moffett 19-yard pass from Rick Neuheisel (Jeff Gaffney kick), 13:00. Chargers 17–10. **Drive: 6 plays, 57 yards, 3:11.**
- TB – Van Tiffin 45-yard field goal, 7:53. Chargers 17–13. **Drive: 10 plays, 51 yards, 5:07.**

**Top passers**

- SDG – Rick Neuheisel – 18/22, 217 yards, TD
- TB – John Reaves – 4/8, 67 yards, TD

**Top rushers**

- SDG – Martin Sartin – 12 rushes, 50 yards, TD
- TB – Mike Hold – 4 rushes, 51 yards

**Top receivers**

- SDG – Al Williams – 5 receptions, 110 yards
- TB – Eric Streater – 2 receptions, 41 yards, TD

Strong performances by Neuheisel and the defense helped the replacement Chargers to another comeback win. Tampa Bay were forced to punt on the game's opening possession, but Al Williams fumbled the punt and the Buccaneers recovered, leading to a touchdown two plays later. Gaffney missed a 38-yard field goal on the next drive, and the following seven possessions ended in punts. Kelley had started the game at quarterback, but Neuheisel replaced him with 6:22 to play in the 2nd quarter. Four plays later, he completed a pass to Harry Holt, who lost a fumble. Tampa Bay recovered, added a field goal and led 10–0 at the break.

San Diego scored on their first three possessions of the second half. First, Neuheisel converted a 3rd and 10 with an 18-yard scramble, setting up a 27-yard field goal that Gaffney successfully converted. After a Buccaneers three-and-out, San Diego drove 80 yards in 9 plays to tie the score. Williams had catches of 20 and 32 yards, and Martin Sartin scored from the 2. A sack by Phillips forced another Buccaneers three-and-out, and the Chargers drove for the go-ahead touchdown, a 19-yard pass from Neuheisel to Tim Moffett two minutes into the final quarter. After Tampa Bay pulled three points closer with a field goal, San Diego drove to the Buccaneers' 16 before Sartin lost a fumble. Tampa Bay soon reached a 4th and 1 at their own 35, and elected to punt with three minutes to play. Sartin converted a 3rd and 1 on the next drive, and the Chargers ran all but seven seconds off the clock before the Buccaneers got the ball back. Carl Brazley ended the game with an interception.

Kelley completed 5 of 11 passes for 53 yards; Neuheisel was 18 of 22 for 217 yards and a touchdown. His completion percentage of 81.8% was a Charger record at the time (minimum 20 attempts). Williams caught 5 passes for 110 yards. The Buccaneers gained only 7 first downs, and 70 passing yards.

==== Week 6: at Los Angeles Raiders ====
Week Six: San Diego Chargers at Los Angeles Raiders – Game summary

Quarter	1	2	3	4	Total
Chargers	7	0	0	16	**23**
Raiders	0	14	0	3	**17**

at Los Angeles Memorial Coliseum, Los Angeles, California

- Date: October 18
- Game time: 1:00 p.m. PDT
- Game weather: 65 °F (18.3 °C), relative humidity 80%, wind 9 mph
- Game attendance: 23,541
- Referee: Red Cashion
- TV announcers (NBC): Dick Enberg and Merlin Olsen
- Box score

Game information

**First quarter**

- SDG – Rick Neuheisel 8-yard run (Jeff Gaffney kick), 11:30. Chargers 7–0. **Drive: 3 plays, 8 yards, 0:17.**

**Second quarter**

- RAI – Carl Aikens 7-yard pass from Vince Evans (Chris Bahr kick), 6:47. Tied 7–7. **Drive: 8 plays, 73 yards, 3:50.**
- RAI – Carl Aikens 32-yard pass from Vince Evans (Chris Bahr kick), 0:01. Raiders 14–7. **Drive: 4 plays, 75 yards, 0:32.**

**Third quarter**

- No scoring plays.

**Fourth quarter**

- SDG – Jeff Gaffney 21-yard field goal, 14:10. Raiders 14–10. **Drive: 5 plays, 66 yards, 2:59.**
- RAI – Chris Bahr 33-yard field goal, 10:41. Raiders 17–10. **Drive: 7 plays, 35 yards, 3:29.**
- SDG – Al Williams 7-yard pass from Mike Kelley (Jeff Gaffney kick), 8:07. Tied 17–17. **Drive: 5 plays, 71 yards, 2:34.**
- SDG – Elvis Patterson 75-yard interception return (kick failed), 0:18. Chargers 23–17.

**Top passers**

- SDG – Mike Kelley – 5/9, 142 yards, TD
- RAI – Vince Evans – 11/31, 207 yards, 2 TD, INT

**Top rushers**

- SDG – Keyvan Jenkins – 11 rushes, 50 yards
- RAI – Vince Evans – 4 rushes, 47 yards

**Top receivers**

- SDG – Calvin Muhammad – 1 reception, 67 yards
- RAI – Mervyn Fernandez – 4 reception, 94 yards

Patterson's late interception return gave the replacement Chargers their third win, ensuring that the regular players would return as division leaders. Patterson gave his team the first scoring chance of the game when he recovered a fumble at the Raider 8; San Diego eventually went for the touchdown on 4th and goal from the 1, but a Sartin sweep lost 8 yards. Miller forced another fumble on the next play, with Walt Harris recovering, again on the Raider 8. This time, Neuheisel followed two incompletions by scrambling for a touchdown. On their next possession, San Diego produced an 11-minute, 22-play drive that took them from their own 6 yard line to a 3rd and goal from the 4, before Neuheisel was sacked and Gaffney saw his 36-yard field goal attempt blocked. The Raiders then drove 73 yards the other way, and tied the score on a touchdown pass from Vince Evans. After a series of punts, the Raiders took over on their own 25 yard line with 33 seconds left. Evans moved the ball to the San Diego 32, from where he threw another touchdown pass a single second before halftime.

Trailing 14–7, the Chargers punted on their first two possessions of the second half, then switched to Kelley at quarterback. His first possession was a three-and-out, but he opened his second with a 67-yard completion to Calvin Muhammad, setting up a short field goal. After Los Angeles responded with a field goal of their own, Kelley connected with Al Williams for 57 yards, with the same pair ending the drive with a touchdown pass on 3rd and goal from the 7. With the score tied at 17–17, the Raiders drove into position for a 37-yard field goal, which Chris Bahr missed wide right with two minutes left. San Diego went three-and-out, and Los Angeles drove to the Charger 33 in the final minute. Patterson then cut in front of an out pattern, intercepted Evans and ran untouched for a 75-yard touchdown return with 18 seconds to play. Los Angeles reached the Charger 45, from where Evans' final pass was incomplete in the end zone as time expired.

Neuheisel completed 12 of 18 passes for 66 yards; Kelley completed 5 of 9 for 142 yards and a touchdown. The replacement Chargers scored 33 of their 50 points in the 4th quarter. The Raiders had 17 of their regular players available, compared to just one (Unrein) for the Chargers.

==== Week 7: vs. Kansas City Chiefs ====
Week Seven: Kansas City Chiefs at San Diego Chargers – Game summary

Quarter	1	2	3	4	Total
Chiefs	0	14	7	0	**21**
Chargers	14	21	0	7	**42**

at Jack Murphy Stadium, San Diego, California

- Date: October 25
- Game time: 1:00 p.m. PST
- Game weather: 68 °F (20.0 °C), relative humidity 76%, wind 7 mph
- Game attendance: 47,972
- Referee: Bob Frederic
- TV announcers (NBC): Tom Hammond and Dave Casper
- Box score

Game information

**First quarter**

- SDG – Wes Chandler 10-yard pass from Dan Fouts (Vince Abbott kick), 9:46. Chargers 7–0. **Drive: 10 plays, 75 yards, 5:14.**
- SDG – Gary Anderson 1-yard run (Vince Abbott kick), 0:10. Chargers 14–0. **Drive: 11 plays, 91 yards, 5:41.**

**Second quarter**

- SDG – Les Miller fumble recovery in end zone (Vince Abbott kick), 11:26. Chargers 21–0.
- SDG – Dan Fouts 1-yard run (Vince Abbott kick), 6:23. Chargers 28–0. **Drive: 6 plays, 38 yards, 2:51.**
- KAN – Carlos Carson 14-yard pass from Bill Kenney (Nick Lowery kick), 4:34. Chargers 28–7. **Drive: 7 plays, 78 yards, 1:49.**
- SDG – Kellen Winslow 19-yard pass from Dan Fouts (Vince Abbott kick), 1:17. Chargers 35–7. **Drive: 7 plays, 71 yards, 3:17.**
- KAN – Carlos Carson 63-yard pass from Bill Kenney (Nick Lowery kick), 1:03. Chargers 35–14. **Drive: 1 play, 63 yards, 0:14.**

**Third quarter**

- KAN – Christian Okoye 1-yard run (Nick Lowery kick), 7:37. Chargers 35–21. **Drive: 6 plays, 93 yards, 2:01.**

**Fourth quarter**

- SDG – Gary Anderson 1-yard run (Vince Abbott kick), 11:44. Chargers 42–21. **Drive: 10 plays, 55 yards, 5:51.**

**Top passers**

- KAN – Bill Kenney – 22/37, 328 yards, 2 TD, INT
- SDG – Dan Fouts – 24/34, 293 yards, 2 TD, INT

**Top rushers**

- KAN – Christian Okoye – 8 rushes, 44 yards, TD
- SDG – Lionel James – 6 rushes, 40 yards

**Top receivers**

- KAN – Carlos Carson – 9 receptions, 197 yards, 2 TD
- SDG – Lionel James – 5 receptions, 72 yards

The regular Chargers returned with a relatively comfortable win. They went 75 yards on their first drive, with Fouts completing 4 of 5 passes for 58 yards, including a 10-yard touchdown to Chandler. Later in the opening quarter, they had a 91-yard touchdown drive; this time Fouts completed 5 of 6 for 71 yards, and Anderson scored with a 1-yard run. In the 2nd quarter, Thomas Benson stopped a threatening Chiefs drive with a fumble recovery, and Mojsiejenko pinned Kansas City at their own 8 with a punt. Two plays later, Bayless sacked Bill Kenney, forcing a fumble that Miller, a replacement player who'd retained his place in the team, recovered in the end zone. The next Charger touchdown was set up by James' 18-yard punt return to the Kansas City 38, setting up a short drive that ended with Fouts sneaking in from the 1; the score was 28–0, with the Chiefs only having gained two first downs. Kenney threw a touchdown on the following drive; in response, San Diego reached a 3rd and 13 at midfield, which they converted when Chandler drew a 31-yard defensive pass interference penalty. Fouts found Winslow in the front corner of the end zone on the following play. Kenney responded with another touchdown pass on the next play from scrimmage, and it was 35–14 at halftime.

Another 18-yard punt return by James set the Chargers up in Chiefs territory early in the second half; they reached a 2nd and goal from the 4, but Fouts fumbled while being sacked, and Kansas City recovered at their own 7. The Chiefs then drove 93 yards in only six plays, aided by three Charger penalties, and scored on Okoye's 1-yard run. Kansas City were threatening to draw closer shortly afterwards when Anderson lost a fumble inside his own 40, but Glenn recovered another fumble two plays later at the Charger 20. Late in the 3rd quarter, Mojsiejenko punted but Kansas City were flagged for roughing the kicker, allowing San Diego to retain possession. Anderson ended that drive with another 1-yard touchdown run. That was the final score of the game; the next two Chiefs possessions ended with a fumble (forced by Lee Williams and recovered by Banks) and an interception by Smith.

Fouts completed 24 of 34 passes for 293 yards, with 2 touchdowns and no interceptions. The Chargers gained 30 first downs and possessed the ball for 37 minutes. Both teams gave up over 100 yards in penalties (141 by the Chiefs, 118 by the Chargers). Chandler's touchdown was the 56th and final one of his career (15 with the New Orleans Saints, 41 for the Chargers).

==== Week 8: vs. Cleveland Browns ====
Week Eight: Cleveland Browns at San Diego Chargers – Game summary

Quarter	1	2	3	4	OT	Total
Browns	7	7	10	0	0	**24**
Chargers	14	0	0	10	3	**27**

at Jack Murphy Stadium, San Diego, California

- Date: November 1
- Game time: 1:00 p.m. PST
- Game weather: 66 °F (18.9 °C), relative humidity 84%, wind 13 mph
- Game attendance: 55,381
- Referee: Fred Silva
- TV announcers (NBC): Gary Gerould and Sam Rutigliano
- Box score

Game information

**First quarter**

- SDG – Lionel James 15-yard run (Vince Abbott kick), 13:55. Chargers 7–0. **Drive: 1 play, 15 yards, 0:09.**
- CLE – Webster Slaughter 20-yard pass from Bernie Kosar (Jeff Jaeger kick), 8:48. Tied 7–7. **Drive: 10 plays, 71 yards, 5:07.**
- SDG – Rod Bernstine 10-yard pass from Dan Fouts (Vince Abbott kick), 4:30. Chargers 14–7. **Drive: 9 plays, 82 yards, 4:18.**

**Second quarter**

- CLE – Brian Brennan 41-yard pass from Bernie Kosar (Jeff Jaeger kick), 5:40. Tied 14–14. **Drive: 4 plays, 83 yards, 2:09.**

**Third quarter**

- CLE – Jeff Jaeger 41-yard field goal, 5:12. Browns 17–14. **Drive: 10 plays, 54 yards, 3:58.**
- CLE – Earnest Byner 1-yard run (Jeff Jaeger kick), 3:12. Browns 24–14. **Drive: 4 plays, 20 yards, 1:44.**

**Fourth quarter**

- SDG – Lionel James 22-yard pass from Dan Fouts (Vince Abbott kick), 5:08. Browns 24–21. **Drive: 7 plays, 75 yards, 4:06.**
- SDG – Vince Abbott 20-yard field goal, 1:46. Tied 24–24. **Drive: 8 plays, 44 yards, 1:37.**

**Overtime**

- SDG – Vince Abbott 33-yard field goal, 12:44. Chargers 27–24. **Drive: 3 plays, 4 yards, 0:56.**

**Top passers**

- CLE – Bernie Kosar – 24/42, 298 yards, 2 TD, 2 INT
- SDG – Dan Fouts – 25/42, 315 yards, 2 TD, INT

**Top rushers**

- CLE – Curtis Adams – 15 rushes, 66 yards
- SDG – Kevin Mack – 14 rushes, 61 yards

**Top receivers**

- CLE – Brian Brennan – 4 receptions, 94 yards, TD
- SDG – Lionel James – 4 receptions, 90 yards, TD

San Diego overturned a 10-point 4th quarter deficit to win in overtime. Their defense got an early turnover when ex-Brown Banks intercepted Bernie Kosar and returned the ball 20 yards to the Cleveland 15 – James went around right end for a touchdown on the next play. Kosar led a touchdown drive in response, but the Chargers came back with a 9-play, 81-yard drive, facing no 3rd downs and scoring via Bernstine's 10-yard catch (his first career touchdown). In the 2nd quarter, Kosar tied the score with his second touchdown pass. James set up a field goal attempt late in the half with a 21-yard punt return, but Abbott was well short from 52 yards out, keeping the score at 14–14.

Banks forced and recovered a fumble early in the second half, setting his offense up at the Cleveland 29, but Fouts gave the ball back with an interception two plays later. The Browns then drove for a field goal, and James lost a fumble on the next play from scrimmage, setting up a short touchdown drive and a 24–14 Cleveland lead. A 66-yard Charger drive then produced no points, as Abbott missed a 32-yard field goal. Phillips sacked Kosar to force a punt, and Fouts passed on every play of the ensuing drive, completing 6 of 7 for 85 yards, including a 22-yard touchdown pass to James with 5:08 to play. Phillips and Unrein split a 3rd-down sack on the following drive, and a short punt started the Chargers off at the Cleveland 46. San Diego drove as far as the Cleveland 2, but Pete Holohan couldn't come down with Fouts' 3rd down pass in the end zone, and Abbott tied the score with a 22-yard field goal, 1:46 from the end of regulation time. Kosar led his team as far as the San Diego 41, but another sack pushed them back, this time split by Glenn and Bayless. Following an incompletion, they were forced to punt, and the game went into an extra period.

Cleveland won the overtime coin toss and elected to receive. After two runs, they faced a 3rd and 2 at their own 36; Kosar's overthrown pass was intercepted by Glenn and returned 20 yards to the Cleveland 25, with a face mask penalty moving the ball five yards further. After two running plays, Abbott drove the winning 33-yard field goal just inside the left upright.

Fouts completed 25 of 42 passes for 315 yards, 2 touchdowns and 1 interception. James rushed 3 times for 21 yards and a touchdown, and caught 4 passes for 90 yards and a further touchdown. This was the last overtime game the Chargers won until 2002.

==== Week 9: at Indianapolis Colts ====
Week Nine: San Diego Chargers at Indianapolis Colts – Game summary

Quarter	1	2	3	4	Total
Chargers	0	0	6	10	**16**
Colts	3	10	0	0	**13**

at Hoosier Dome, Indianapolis, Indiana

- Date: November 8
- Game time: 1:00 p.m. EST
- Game weather: N/A (game played indoors)
- Game attendance: 60,459
- Referee: Jerry Markbreit
- TV announcers (NBC): Marv Albert and Joe Namath
- Box score

Game information

**First quarter**

- IND – Dean Biasucci 37-yard field goal, 6:26. Colts 3–0. **Drive: 16 plays, 59 yards, 8:34.**

**Second quarter**

- IND – Dean Biasucci 27-yard field goal, 10:39. Colts 6–0. **Drive: 4 plays, 5 yards, 1:31.**
- IND – Albert Bentley 8-yard run (Dean Biasucci kick), 0:55. Colts 13–0. **Drive: 13 plays, 80 yards, 6:28.**

**Third quarter**

- SDG – Vince Abbott 42-yard field goal, 11:04. Colts 13–3. **Drive: 10 plays, 55 yards, 3:56.**
- SDG – Vince Abbott 37-yard field goal, 3:12. Colts 13–6. **Drive: 6 plays, 21 yards, 2:43.**

**Fourth quarter**

- SDG – Lionel James 5-yard pass from Dan Fouts (Vince Abbott kick), 12:47. Tied 13–13. **Drive: 7 plays, 47 yards, 2:55.**
- SDG – Vince Abbott 39-yard field goal, 0:12. Chargers 16–13. **Drive: 11 plays, 59 yards, 3:54.**

**Top passers**

- SDG – Dan Fouts – 16/30, 214 yards, TD, 3 INT
- IND – Jack Trudeau – 12/18, 127 yards

**Top rushers**

- SDG – Curtis Adams – 13 rushes, 52 yards
- IND – Eric Dickerson – 35 rushes, 138 yards

**Top receivers**

- SDG – Wes Chandler – 4 receptions, 73 yards
- IND – Matt Bouza – 3 reception, 53 yards

Humiston recovered a key fumble as San Diego fought back from a 13-point halftime deficit to win. Indianapolis opened the game with an 8-minute field goal drive, and had crossed into Charger territory again when Charles sacked Jack Trudeau, forcing a fumble that Byrd recovered. In the 2nd quarter, two Fouts interceptions set up Colts field goal attempts, though Dean Biasucci missed the second of these. On the next Indianapolis drive, Eric Dickerson rushed 8 times for 50 yards, and Albert Bentley found the end zone for a 13–0 lead. Fouts was intercepted again on the final play of the half.

The first drive of the second half ended with Abbott's 42-yard field goal. Indianapolis tried to convert a 4th and 1 from their own 40 on the following drive, but Banks stopped Bentley for no gain. San Diego reached a 3rd and 1 at the Indianapolis 18, whereupon Fouts fumbled; Center Don Macek recovered, allowing Abbott to kick another field goal, from 37 yards. The Chargers completed their third consecutive scoring drive early in the final quarter; Fouts converted a 3rd and 11 with a 23-yard completion to Chandler, then threw a 5-yard touchdown pass to James on 3rd and goal. After an exchange of punts, the Colts drove from their own 36 to a 1st and goal at the Charger 8. On the following play, Dickerson ran the ball inside the 2 before being tackled by several Chargers; Smith knocked the ball loose, and Humiston recovered in his own end zone with four minutes to play. San Diego then drove 59 yards on 11 plays, with Fouts completed all three of his passes for 40 yards. Abbot made the game-winning field goal from 39 yards with 12 seconds to play.

San Diego improved in several areas after halftime. Their time of possession nearly doubled, from 7:48 to 14:23, while their defense gave up 12 first downs in the first half and 6 in the second. Dickerson gained 103 of his 138 yards before halftime.

==== Week 10: vs. Los Angeles Raiders ====
Week Ten: Los Angeles Raiders at San Diego Chargers – Game summary

Quarter	1	2	3	4	Total
Raiders	0	0	0	14	**14**
Chargers	7	9	0	0	**16**

at Jack Murphy Stadium, San Diego, California

- Date: November 15
- Game time: 5:00 p.m. PST
- Game weather: 60 °F (15.6 °C), relative humidity 71%, wind 8 mph
- Game attendance: 60,639
- Referee: Pat Haggerty
- TV announcers (ESPN): Mike Patrick, Roy Firestone and John Matuszak
- Box score

Game information

**First quarter**

- SDG – Kellen Winslow 9-yard pass from Dan Fouts (Vince Abbott kick), 9:09. Chargers 7–0. **Drive: 8 plays, 22 yards, 2:45.**

**Second quarter**

- SDG – Vince Abbott 38-yard field goal, 14:10. Tied 7–7. **Drive: 8 plays, 64 yards.**
- SDG – Vince Abbott 47-yard field goal, 12:18. Tied 7–7. **Drive: 4 plays, 7 yards.**
- SDG – Vince Abbott 39-yard field goal, 3:39. Tied 7–7. **Drive: 11 plays, 29 yards.**

**Third quarter**

- No scoring plays.

**Fourth quarter**

- RAI – Dokie Williams 5-yard pass from Marc Wilson (Chris Bahr kick), 8:01. Raiders 17–10. **Drive: 3 plays, 19 yards, 1:23.**
- RAI – James Lofton 47-yard pass from Marc Wilson (Chris Bahr kick), 0:16. Raiders 17–10. **Drive: 4 plays, 72 yards, 0:39.**

**Top passers**

- RAI – Marc Wilson – 15/32, 228 yards, 2 TD, INT
- SDG – Dan Fouts – 15/32, 149 yards, TD, INT

**Top rushers**

- RAI – Marcus Allen – 13 rushes, 82 yards
- SDG – Curtis Adams – 21 rushes, 75 yards

**Top receivers**

- RAI – James Lofton – 3 reception, 84 yards, TD
- SDG – Kellen Winslow – 6 receptions, 53 yards, TD

San Diego won their eighth straight game as a Raider rally fell short. Smith intercepted Marc Wilson's first pass of the game and returned it 22 yards to the Raider 22. A defensive holding penalty on 3rd down prolonged the ensuing drive, and Fouts hit a wide open Winslow for a 9-yard touchdown on 3rd and 8. Bahr missed a 41-yard field goal on the next drive. Late in the opening quarter, another Charger drive was prolonged by a 3rd down penalty, this time of 30 yards – a pass interference drawn by Anderson. That led to a 38-yard field goal by Abbott; he then made a 47-yarder, after Jeff Jackson recovered a fumble in Raider territory. When Abbott was successful from 39 yards late in the half, San Diego led 16–0.

The first nine drives of the second half all ended in punts, with neither offense crossing the halfway line. In the final quarter, San Diego were able to advance from their own 3 to the Raider 41, aided by a 29-yard pass interference penalty, again drawn by Anderson. Fouts then overthrew his intended receiver, resulting in an interception and 58 yard return. Wilson threw a touchdown three plays later with eight minutes left. Aided by another Raider 3rd down penalty, the Chargers then ran over four minutes off the clock before punting. Los Angeles also punted, after reaching 4th and 13 at their own 33 with barely two minutes left. After a Charger three-and-out, the Raiders covered 72 yards in only four plays, scoring on James Lofton's 47-yard touchdown over Charles Romes with 16 seconds left. The ensuing onside kick went out of bounds, allowing San Diego to run out the clock.

San Diego picked up only 88 yards in the second half, and were outgained 365–248 overall. They profited from 17 Raider penalties for 186 yards (the Chargers were penalized 7 times for 60 yards). As of 2022, this is tied for the most penalties given up by a Charger opponent, and top for penalty yards.

==== Week 11: at Seattle Seahawks ====
Week Eleven: San Diego Chargers at Seattle Seahawks – Game summary

Quarter	1	2	3	4	Total
Chargers	0	3	0	0	**3**
Seahawks	3	14	10	7	**34**

at Kingdome, Seattle, Washington

- Date: November 22
- Game time: 1:00 p.m. PST
- Game weather: N/A (game played indoors)
- Game attendance: 62,444
- Referee: Ben Dreith
- TV announcers (NBC): Charlie Jones and Jimmy Cefalo
- Box score

Game information

**First quarter**

- SEA – Norm Johnson 34-yard field goal, 12:46. Seahawks 3–0. **Drive: 4 plays, 8 yards, 2:14.**

**Second quarter**

- SEA – John L. Williams 12-yard pass from Dave Krieg (Norm Johnson kick), 14:53. Seahawks 10–0. **Drive: 4 plays, 54 yards, 2:48.**
- SDG – Vince Abbott 33-yard field goal, 10:27. Seahawks 10–3. **Drive: 10 plays, 65 yards, 4:26.**
- SEA – Curt Warner 5-yard run (Norm Johnson kick), 6:13. Seahawks 17–3. **Drive: 10 plays, 73 yards, 4:14.**

**Third quarter**

- SEA – Dave Krieg 11-yard run (Norm Johnson kick), 12:36. Seahawks 24–3. **Drive: 5 plays, 78 yards, 2:24.**
- SEA – Norm Johnson 22-yard field goal, 0:06. Seahawks 27–3. **Drive: 12 plays, 66 yards, 7:11.**

**Fourth quarter**

- SEA – Steve Largent 5-yard pass from Dave Krieg (Norm Johnson kick), 9:14. Seahawks 34–3. **Drive: 10 plays, 44 yards, 5:18.**

**Top passers**

- SDG – Mark Herrmann – 12/19, 140 yards, INT
- SEA – Dave Krieg – 19/26, 246 yards, 2 TD

**Top rushers**

- SDG – Curtis Adams – 5 rushes, 12 yards
- SEA – Curt Warner – 23 rushes, 119 yards, TD

**Top receivers**

- SDG – Gary Anderson – 5 receptions, 42 yards
  SDG – Lionel James – 2 receptions, 42 yards
- SEA – Steve Largent – 5 reception, 84 yards, TD

Seattle dominated San Diego to end their winning streak. Anderson lost a fumble on the opening kickoff return, leading to a Seahawks' field goal. San Diego responded by driving into Seattle territory and attempting a 4th and 2 at the 44. Herrmann, starting at quarterback because Fouts had a calf injury, was unable to handle the snap, and the attempt failed. The Charger defense thwarted the next Seattle drive when Glenn forced a fumble and Smith recovered at his 10, but the Seahawks scored a touchdown on their following possession. A 34-yard catch by James set up the lone Charger score of the game (a 33-yard Abbott field goal), but Seattle came straight back with another touchdown, and led 17–3 at halftime. They continued to pull away in the second half. Fouts was inserted into the game, but was sacked twice and intercepted once before Herrmann came back in to finish.

San Diego were outgained by 496 yards to 156, outrushed by 277 to 17, possessed the ball for 18:25 (including only 5:12 in the second half); Seattle generated 34 first downs to the Chargers' 6. The yardage differential of −340 was the worst in franchise history to that point, eventually being surpassed in 2003. With the win, Seattle pulled within a game of the Chargers atop the AFC West.

==== Week 12: vs. Denver Broncos ====
Week Twelve: Denver Broncos at San Diego Chargers – Game summary

Quarter	1	2	3	4	Total
Broncos	7	10	14	0	**31**
Chargers	7	3	0	7	**17**

at Jack Murphy Stadium, San Diego, California

- Date: November 29
- Game time: 1:00 p.m. PST
- Game weather: 60 °F (15.6 °C), relative humidity 67%, wind 9 mph
- Game attendance: 61,880
- Referee: Gene Barth
- TV announcers (NBC): Charlie Jones and Jimmy Cefalo
- Box score

Game information

**First quarter**

- SDG – Vencie Glenn 103-yard interception return (Vince Abbott kick), 2:09. Chargers 7–0.
- DEN – Sammy Winder 1-yard run (Rich Karlis kick), 0:22. Tied 7–7. **Drive: 5 plays, 77 yards, 1:47.**

**Second quarter**

- DEN – Ricky Nattiel 46-yard pass from John Elway (Rich Karlis kick), 8:53. Broncos 14–7. **Drive: 9 plays, 85 yards, 4:32.**
- SDG – Vince Abbott 32-yard field goal, 6:04. Broncos 14–10. **Drive: 9 plays, 63 yards, 2:49.**
- DEN – Rich Karlis 27-yard field goal, 1:09. Broncos 17–10. **Drive: 13 plays, 76 yards, 4:55.**

**Third quarter**

- DEN – Gene Lang 5-yard pass from John Elway (Rich Karlis kick), 9:27. Broncos 24–10. **Drive: 9 plays, 55 yards, 5:33.**
- DEN – Vance Johnson 9-yard pass from John Elway (Rich Karlis kick), 1:20. Broncos 31–10. **Drive: 9 plays, 80 yards, 4:24.**

**Fourth quarter**

- SDG – Curtis Adams 1-yard run (Vince Abbott kick), 14:06. Broncos 31–17. **Drive: 7 plays, 82 yards, 2:04.**

**Top passers**

- DEN – John Elway – 21/32, 347 yards, 3 TD, INT
- SDG – Dan Fouts – 23/40, 322 yards, 2 INT

**Top rushers**

- DEN – Gene Lang – 24 rushes, 73 yards
- SDG – Curtis Adams – 5 rushes, 38 yards, TD

**Top receivers**

- DEN – Ricky Nattiel – 4 reception, 118 yards, TD
- SDG – Lionel James – 7 receptions, 37 yards

Glenn's record-tying interception return wasn't enough to beat the Broncos, who drew within half a game of San Diego. On Denver's first drive they drove 74 yards to a 2nd and goal at the Charger 6, before John Elway's pass was intercepted in the end zone by Glenn; he took off along the right sideline, slipped one tackle, benefitted from a block by Benson, and completed a 103-yard touchdown return, the joint-longest in league history at that point. Elway bounced back on his next two drives, a 51-yard completion setting up a touchdown run, and a 46-yard completion accounting for another touchdown. After an exchange of field goals, Fouts completed four passes for 58 yards, and the Chargers reached a 3rd and goal at the Denver 7 with 17 seconds left and no timeouts, trailing 17–10. Winslow caught Fouts' next pass inside the 1, but was ruled not to have broken the plane of the goal line before being pushed back by three Broncos. Time ran out before San Diego could attempt a field goal.

Denver extended their lead on their first two drives of the second half via two further Elway touchdown passes. After the second of these, the Chargers responded; Anderson had catches of 38 and 33 yards, and Adams scored on a 1-yard run with 14 minutes to play. Denver's next drive ended with a missed field goal, but ran seven minutes off the clock. Fouts drove San Diego into opposition territory before his deep pass was intercepted to effectively clinch the game for Denver. He was intercepted again in the final minute.

Fouts completed 23 of 40 passes for 322 yards, with 2 interceptions. The Chargers were again dominated in terms of time of possession, holding the ball for only 18:41. They gave up a season-high 522 yards of offense. While contemporary reports described Glenn's touchdown as a new record for an interception return, there had been a previous 103-yarder, by Pete Barnum in 1926. The record was tied again by Louis Oliver in 1992 and eventually broken by Ed Reed in 2004.

==== Week 13: at Houston Oilers ====
Week Thirteen: San Diego Chargers at Houston Oilers – Game summary

Quarter	1	2	3	4	Total
Chargers	0	5	6	7	**18**
Oilers	10	10	7	6	**33**

at Astrodome, Houston, Texas

- Date: December 6
- Game time: 12:00 p.m. CST
- Game weather: N/A (game played indoors)
- Game attendance: 31,714
- Referee: Dick Hantak
- TV announcers (NBC): Don Criqui and Bob Trumpy
- Box score

Game information

**First quarter**

- HOU – Robert Lyles 55-yard defensive fumble return (Tony Zendejas kick), 12:25. Oilers 7–0.
- HOU – Tony Zendejas 48-yard field goal, 3:51. Oilers 10–0. **Drive: 6 plays, 13 yards, 2:54.**

**Second quarter**

- HOU – Allen Pinkett 4-yard run (Tony Zendejas kick), 11:36. Oilers 17–0. **Drive: 9 plays, 80 yards, 4:50.**
- HOU – Tony Zendejas 47-yard field goal, 7:00. Oilers 20–0. **Drive: 8 plays, 52 yards, 2:44.**
- SDG – Safety, Lee Williams sacked Warren Moon in end zone, 4:53. Oilers 20–2.
- SDG – Vince Abbott 27-yard field goal, 0:06. Oilers 20–5. **Drive: 7 plays, 69 yards, 1:25.**

**Third quarter**

- HOU – Mike Rozier 1-yard run (Tony Zendejas kick), 10:03. Oilers 27–5. **Drive: 8 plays, 63 yards, 3:39.**
- SDG – Kellen Winslow 6-yard pass from Dan Fouts (kick failed), 5:20. Oilers 27–11. **Drive: 3 plays, 34 yards, 0:44.**

**Fourth quarter**

- HOU – Warren Moon 3-yard run (kick failed), 13:20. Oilers 33–11. **Drive: 5 plays, 30 yards, 1:40.**
- SDG – Gary Anderson 9-yard pass from Mark Herrmann (Vince Abbott kick), 0:26. Oilers 33–18. **Drive: 8 plays, 63 yards, 1:46.**

**Top passers**

- SDG – Dan Fouts – 16/33, 196 yards, TD
- HOU – Warren Moon – 13/24, 186 yards, INT

**Top rushers**

- SDG – Tim Spencer – 4 rushes, 16 yards
- HOU – Allen Pinkett – 11 rushes, 53 yards, TD

**Top receivers**

- SDG – Wes Chandler – 10 receptions, 140 yards
- HOU – Ernest Givins – 5 reception, 93 yards

San Diego fell out of first place in their division with a third straight loss. Glenn intercepted Warren Moon's first pass of the game, setting his offense up at the Oiler 30. Three plays later, Fouts was sacked on a blitz and fumbled; Houston ran the ball back 55 yards for a touchdown. Chandler later fumbled near midfield, setting up a Houston field goal, and the Oilers added ten more points on their following two drives. San Diego staged a mini-revival late in the half, with Lee Williams sacking Moon for a safety, and the offense driving to a 3rd and 5 at the Houston 10 with seven seconds to play. Saunders opted not to risk another play, settling for an Abbott field goal and a 20–5 halftime scoreline.

The Chargers drew no closer in the second half. Houston scored another touchdown the first time they had the ball, then James fumbled at the Oiler 5. Holland drew a 33-yard pass interference penalty on the next drive, and Fouts beat the Oiler blitz to find Winslow for a 6-yard touchdown. San Diego forced a punt, but Fouts again fumbled while being sacked, with Houston recovering at the Charger 30. That led to a touchdown run by Moon, and San Diego didn't score again until the final minute, when Herrmann threw a 9-yard touchdown to Anderson.

Patterson and one Oiler were ejected for their roles in a fracas with one second left in the first half. Chandler caught 10 passes for 140 yards. San Diego outgained Houston by 8 yards (332–324), but fumbled four times and lost them all. Winslow's touchdown was the 45th and final one of his career.

==== Week 14: vs. Pittsburgh Steelers ====
Week Fourteen: Pittsburgh Steelers at San Diego Chargers – Game summary

Quarter	1	2	3	4	Total
Steelers	0	7	10	3	**20**
Chargers	9	0	0	7	**16**

at Jack Murphy Stadium, San Diego, California

- Date: December 13
- Game time: 1:00 p.m. PST
- Game weather: 53 °F (11.7 °C), relative humidity 38%, wind 17 mph
- Game attendance: 51,605
- Referee: Jim Tunney
- TV announcers (NBC): Don Criqui and Bob Trumpy
- Box score

Game information

**First quarter**

- SDG – David Brandon recovered blocked punt in end zone (Vince Abbott kick), 9:13. Chargers 7–0.
- SDG – Safety, Chuck Ehin sacked Mark Malone in end zone, 0:36. Chargers 9–0.

**Second quarter**

- PIT – Frank Pollard 8-yard run (Gary Anderson kick), 5:23. Chargers 9–7. **Drive: 4 plays, 39 yards, 2:43.**

**Third quarter**

- PIT – Mark Malone 7-yard run (Gary Anderson kick), 8:14. Steelers 14–9. **Drive: 5 plays, 69 yards, 1:30.**
- PIT – Gary Anderson 43-yard field goal, 0:37. Steelers 17–9. **Drive: 6 plays, 45 yards, 3:56.**

**Fourth quarter**

- PIT – Gary Anderson 33-yard field goal, 9:04. Steelers 20–9. **Drive: 10 plays, 46 yards, 5:01.**
- SDG – Lionel James 15-yard pass from Dan Fouts (Vince Abbott kick), 2:56. Steelers 20–16. **Drive: 8 plays, 58 yards, 1:35.**

**Top passers**

- PIT – Mark Malone – 13/26, 164 yards
- SDG – Dan Fouts – 29/52, 334 yards, TD, INT

**Top rushers**

- PIT – Frank Pollard – 14 rushes, 44 yards, TD
- SDG – Tim Spencer – 11 rushes, 47 yards

**Top receivers**

- PIT – Weegie Thompson – 4 reception, 73 yards
- SDG – Wes Chandler – 7 receptions, 116 yards

Numerous errors cost the Chargers a chance to move back into first place. Fouts fumbled a handoff to Spencer on the game's second play, but Charles forced Pittsburgh quarterback Mark Malone to fumble in turn a play later, with Smith recovering. San Diego advanced to the Steeler 12 before turning the ball over with a further fumble, this time by Adams. However, they scored soon afterwards when Glenn blocked a punt and Brandon recovered in the end zone. After Pittsburgh missed a field goal, Winslow was ruled just short of the end zone on a 30-yard catch. Anderson appeared to have run for a touchdown on the following play, but McKnight's illegal motion penalty negated the score. Three plays later, the Chargers went for it on 4th and goal from the 1, but Spencer fumbled as he reached for the end zone. San Diego's defense was able convert the good field position into two points on the next play, as Chuck Ehin sacked Malone in the end zone for a safety. Pittsburgh shanked the ensuing free kick, but Daniel Hunter failed to gather the ball at the Steeler 43. In the 2nd quarter, James fumbled on a punt return, leaving the Steelers to drive only 39 yards for their first touchdown of the day. After Abbott missed a 42-yard field goal in the final minute of the half, San Diego led only 9–7.

The Chargers appeared to have earned a 1st down on the Steeler 13 on their first possession of the second half, but Chandler's 22-yard catch was wiped out by another illegal motion penalty, this time on Holohan. That drive ended with Abbott's 48-yard field goal falling short and to the left. Pittsburgh then took the lead, driving 69 yards in only five plays, with Malone running the ball in from the 7. After a third consecutive Charger drive ended in a missed Abbott field goal (short again and wide right, from 46 yards), the Steelers added two Gary Anderson field goals to lead 20–9. San Diego quickly moved into Pittsburgh territory, but a deflected Fouts pass was intercepted with seven minutes to play. The Steeles went three-and-out, and San Diego drove 58 yards in 8 plays to get back into the game. Fouts converted a 4th and 10 with a 14-yard pass to Chandler, and connected with James for back-to-back 15-yard gains, the latter for a touchdown. Following another Steeler three-and-out, San Diego began their final possession on their own 20 with 1:50 to play. Chandler began the drive with a 17-yard catch, Spencer converted a 4th and 1 with a 10-yard carry, and a 20-yard Chandler reception moved the ball to the Pittsburgh 24 with 22 seconds left. From there, Fouts threw four consecutive incompletions.

The Chargers outgained Pittsburgh by 435 yards to 254, but committed five of the game's six turnovers, losing four fumbles for the second consecutive week. Chandler caught 7 passes for 116 yards. Fouts completed 29 of 52 passes for 334 yards, one touchdown and one interception. The touchdown pass was the 254th and final one of his career.

==== Week 15: vs. Indianapolis Colts ====
Week Fifteen: Indianapolis Colts at San Diego Chargers – Game summary

Quarter	1	2	3	4	Total
Colts	7	6	0	7	**20**
Chargers	7	0	0	0	**7**

at Jack Murphy Stadium, San Diego, California

- Date: December 20
- Game time: 1:00 p.m. PST
- Game weather: 53 °F (11.7 °C), relative humidity 80%, wind 7 mph
- Game attendance: 46,211
- Referee: Jerry Markbreit
- TV announcers (NBC): Don Criqui and Paul Maguire
- Box score

Game information

**First quarter**

- SDG – Dan Fouts 1-yard run (Vince Abbott kick), 7:59. Chargers 7–0. **Drive: 13 plays, 74 yards, 7:01.**
- IND – Bill Brooks 42-yard pass from Jack Trudeau (Dean Biasucci kick), 2:53. Tied 7–7. **Drive: 7 plays, 74 yards, 2:51.**

**Second quarter**

- IND – Dean Biasucci 36-yard field goal, 3:18. Colts 10–7. **Drive: 12 plays, 47 yards, 6:02.**
- IND – Dean Biasucci 41-yard field goal, 0:01. Colts 13–7. **Drive: 9 plays, 41 yards, 1:07.**

**Third quarter**

- No scoring plays.

**Fourth quarter**

- IND – Albert Bentley 3-yard run (Dean Biasucci kick), 1:53. Colts 20–7. **Drive: 3 plays, 68 yards, 0:57.**

**Top passers**

- IND – Jack Trudeau – 20/39, 201 yards, TD
- SDG – Dan Fouts – 22/37, 257 yards, 3 INT

**Top rushers**

- IND – Eric Dickerson – 23 rushes, 115 yards
- SDG – Curtis Adams – 7 rushes, 26 yards

**Top receivers**

- IND – Bill Brooks – 4 reception, 86 yards, TD
- SDG – Gary Anderson – 7 receptions, 68 yards

A fifth straight loss nearly eliminated the Chargers from playoff contention. They began the game well, taking the opening kickoff and driving 74 yards in 13 plays to take the lead. Fouts completed 5 of 5 passes for 56 yards, and scored on a 4th-down quarterback sneak. Indianapolis tied the score later in the 1st quarter when Bill Brooks took advantage of a coverage error by Bayless on a 42-yard touchdown catch. The Chargers reached the Colts' 25 yard line in the 2nd quarter, but Fouts took a 3rd-down sack and Abbott was short and left on a 52-yard field goal try. Indianapolis scored through a pair of Biasucci field goals on their final two possessions of the half, and led 13–7.

Neither team advanced further than the opposition 34 during the first twelve possessions of the second half; Indianapolis punted six times, while San Diego punted four times and Fouts was intercepted twice. Eventually, Dickerson broke off a 53-yard run and Bentley scored on the play after the two minute warning. Fouts threw incomplete on 4th and 2 from the Colt 26 in the final minute, and was intercepted as time expired.

Fouts completed 22 of 37 attempts for 257 yards and 3 interceptions, while being sacked 5 times for the loss of 43 yards. It was the final game of his career, as he missed the finale with a slightly torn rotator cuff, and announced his retirement three months after the end of the season. The result meant that San Diego would be eliminated if either the Steelers or Oilers won in week 16, regardless of their own result.

==== Week 16: at Denver Broncos ====
Week Sixteen: San Diego Chargers at Denver Broncos – Game summary

Quarter	1	2	3	4	Total
Chargers	0	0	0	0	**0**
Broncos	14	0	0	10	**24**

at Mile High Stadium, Denver, Colorado

- Date: December 27
- Game time: 2:00 p.m. MST
- Game weather: 18 °F (−7.8 °C), relative humidity 91%, wind 17 mph, wind chill 3
- Game attendance: 21,189
- Referee: Fred Wyant
- TV announcers (NBC): Charlie Jones and Jimmy Cefalo
- Box score

Game information

**First quarter**

- DEN – Kevin Clark 71-yard punt return (Rich Karlis kick), 13:10. Broncos 7–0.
- DEN – Sammy Winder 1-yard run (Rich Karlis kick), 1:04. Broncos 14–0. **Drive: 7 plays, 38 yards, 4:20.**

**Second quarter**

- No scoring plays.

**Third quarter**

- No scoring plays.

**Fourth quarter**

- DEN – Rich Karlis 26-yard field goal, 11:10. Broncos 17–0. **Drive: 12 plays, 70 yards, 6:42.**
- DEN – Ricky Hunley 52-yard interception return (Rich Karlis kick), 10:00. Broncos 24–0.

**Top passers**

- SDG – Mark Herrmann – 13/23, 123 yards, 4 INT
- DEN – John Elway – 7/20, 98 yards, INT

**Top rushers**

- SDG – Tim Spencer – 5 rushes, 38 yards, TD
- DEN – Sammy Winder – 23 rushes, 67 yards, TD

**Top receivers**

- SDG – Jamie Holland – 3 receptions, 64 yards
- DEN – Orson Mobley – 2 reception, 35 yards

San Diego's season ended with a shutout in a Denver blizzard. They were confirmed to have missed the playoffs during the 1st quarter, when Houston completed a victory over the Cincinnati Bengals. By then, the Chargers already trailed to a 71-yard punt return touchdown. Denver added a second touchdown later in the quarter, with San Diego yet to register a first down after three possessions. The Chargers were inside the Denver 30 three times in the 2nd quarter, but Herrmann was intercepted twice, and Abbott missed a 26-yard field goal. The Chargers gained only 22 yards and a single first down after halftime, while Denver added a field goal and an interception-return touchdown.

Herrmann finished with 13 completions from 23 attempts for 123 yards, with 4 interceptions; backup Vlasic added a fifth interception on his debut appearance. Winslow caught 6 passes for 44 yards. It was the final regular season game of his career, as he retired during the 1988 season without playing again.

=== Standings ===
AFC West
	W	L	T	PCT	DIV	CONF	PF	PA	STK
^{(1)} Denver Broncos	10	4	1	.700	7–1	8–3	379	288	W2
^{(5)} Seattle Seahawks	9	6	0	.600	4–3	5–6	371	314	L1
San Diego Chargers	8	7	0	.533	3–4	6–7	253	317	L6
Los Angeles Raiders	5	10	0	.333	2–6	3–8	301	289	L3
Kansas City Chiefs	4	11	0	.267	3–5	3–9	273	388	W1

== Awards ==
Three Chargers were named to the 1988 Pro Bowl, each of whom was also named a 2nd-team All-Pro by the Associated Press.

Player	Position	Pro Bowl starter	Pro Bowl reserve	AP 2nd team All-Pro	NEA 2nd team All-Pro
Jim Lachey	Tackle		Yes	Yes	
Ralf Mojsiejenko	Punter	Yes		Yes	Yes
Kellen Winslow	Tight end	Yes		Yes	
