= David Brandon =

David Brandon may refer to:

- Dave Brandon (born 1952), American businessman
- David Brandon (American football) (born 1965), American football player
- David Brandon (architect) (1813–1897), Scottish architect
- David Brandon (actor) (born 1951), Irish actor
