= Curtis Rouse =

American football player (1960–2013)

No. 68, 77
- Positions: Guard, tackle

Personal information
- Born: July 13, 1960; Augusta, Georgia, U.S.
- Died: May 3, 2013 (aged 52); Nashville, Tennessee, U.S.
- Listed height: 6 ft 3 in (1.91 m)
- Listed weight: 316 lb (143 kg)

Career information
- High school: Augusta (GA) Laney
- College: Chattanooga
- NFL draft: 1982: 11th round, 286th overall pick

Career history
- Minnesota Vikings (1982–1986); San Diego Chargers (1987)

Career NFL statistics
- Games played: 68
- Games started: 32
- Fumble recoveries: 4
- Stats at Pro Football Reference

Curtis Lamar Rouse (July 13, 1960 – May 3, 2013) was an American professional football offensive lineman who played six seasons in the National Football League (NFL) with the Minnesota Vikings and the San Diego Chargers.

== Early life ==
A graduate of Lucy Craft Laney High School in Augusta, Georgia, Rouse attended the University of Tennessee at Chattanooga. He played on Chattanooga's 1979 Southern Conference championship team as a sophomore. During his senior year, he was named to the All-Southern Conference team and played in the Senior Bowl.

== Professional career ==
Rouse was drafted by the Minnesota Vikings in the 11th round of the 1982 NFL draft. He played offensive guard, offensive tackle, and special teams for the Vikings from 1982 to 1986, including all sixteen games in the 1983, 1984, and 1985 seasons. Released by the Vikings following the 1986 season, he played one final season with the San Diego Chargers in 1987. During his playing career, he was the heaviest player in the NFL at 350 pounds.

On August 5, 1997, at age 37, Rouse suffered a massive stroke at his home in Clarksville, Tennessee; his weight had ballooned to almost 500 pounds at the time. He was initially not expected to survive, but as of November 1997, he had regained approximately 90 percent of his speech. In 2003, the Chattanooga Times Free Press placed him on Tennessee-Chattanooga's All-Century Football Team, and in 2005 he was elected to the university's Athletics Hall of Fame. On Friday May 3, 2013, former Minnesota Vikings teammate Greg Coleman announced on his Twitter that Rouse had died. He was 52.

== Sources ==
- Ballew, Bill. Tough Enough to be Vikings: Minnesota's Purple Pride from A to Z. Asheville, North Carolina: Old Norse Publishing, 1999. (pages 276–277)
- Barreiro, Dan. After Stroke, ex-Viking Rouse is Beating the Odds. Minneapolis Star Tribune. 18 November 1997.
