= Pete Barnum =

American football player (1902–1929)

No. 22
- Position: Fullback

Personal information
- Born: January 17, 1902; Parkersburg, West Virginia, U.S.
- Died: June 25, 1929 (aged 27); Baltimore, Maryland, U.S.
- Listed height: 5 ft 10 in (1.78 m)
- Listed weight: 195 lb (88 kg)

Career information
- High school: Parkersburg
- College: West Virginia

Career history
- Columbus Tigers (1926)

Career NFL statistics
- Games played: 6
- Games started: 5
- Touchdowns: 1
- Stats at Pro Football Reference

Robert "Pete" Barnum (January 17, 1902 – June 29, 1929) was an American football fullback. After playing college football for the West Virginia Mountaineers, he spent one season with the Columbus Tigers of the National Football League (NFL) in 1926. He eventually became a puddler for Bethlehem Steel Company, and died in a steel working accident in 1929.

== College career ==
After graduating from Parkersburg High School, where he received the nickname "king of scholastic football players", Barnum attended West Virginia University.

With the Mountaineers football team, Barnum played fullback and punter during his first season in 1923; in 1929, Max E. Hannum of The Pittsburgh Press described Barnum as "a valuable man in the combination that he couldn't be blasted out of the lineup." He was ineligible to play in 1924 for academic reasons before returning to the team in 1925. During West Virginia's lone loss in 1925 to Pittsburgh, Barnum recorded 103 rushing yards and a touchdown, with Hannum writing he "made himself a nuisance from the standpoint of the Panther supporters."

== Professional career ==
Upon completing his college career, Barnum received contracts from the Columbus Tigers and Pottsville Maroons. Although the Maroons provided an enticing offer, he chose to sign with Columbus for the 1926 NFL season. He began the year as the Tigers' left halfback.

In the second game of the season, a 14–2 victory over the Canton Bulldogs, Barnum intercepted a Canton pass in his own end zone and returned it 103 yards for a touchdown. The score, which the Green Bay Press-Gazette described as "one for the books", is the longest interception return for a touchdown by a rookie in NFL history. This record was tied by Kamren Kinchens in 2024.

The Tigers finished the season 1–6, with Barnum playing in all but one game, and folded after the season.

== Later life and death ==
After ending his NFL career, Barnum moved to Maryland and accepted a position at Bethlehem Steel as a puddler. He was one of six individuals selected by the company for its college graduate training program. In addition to his puddling duties, Barnum played for the company's works team Bethlehem Grays. Described as the "outstanding back of the (Maryland football) league" by The Evening Sun, Barnum recorded an 80-yard touchdown in the 1928 season finale.

On June 21, 1929, Barnum was working at Bethlehem's Sparrows Point plant when he stumbled and fell into a vat of molten metal, where he held onto a ledge inside until he could be extracted by his coworkers. He suffered severe burns from his feet up to his neck, along with burns to his chest, left arm and hand. Barnum was transported to Maryland General Hospital, where initial reports claimed he was "winning his fight for life" and doctors expressed optimism for his recovery. However, he died from his injuries on June 25; he was 27 years old.

Barnum was survived by his younger brother Len Barnum. Like his brother, Len would also play in the NFL, winning the 1938 NFL championship with the New York Giants.
