= Kevin Scott (running back) =

American football player (born 1963)

No. 24, 35
- Position: Running back

Personal information
- Born: October 24, 1963 (age 63); Fort Bragg, North Carolina, U.S.
- Listed height: 5 ft 9 in (1.75 m)
- Listed weight: 181 lb (82 kg)

Career information
- High school: Rogers (Puyallup, Washington)
- College: Stanford (1983–1986)
- NFL draft: 1987: undrafted

Career history
- San Diego Chargers (1987–1988); Dallas Cowboys (1989)
- Stats at Pro Football Reference

Kevin Bernard Scott (born October 24, 1963) is an American former professional football running back who played in the National Football League (NFL) with the San Diego Chargers and Dallas Cowboys. He played college football for the Stanford Cardinal.

== Early life ==
Kevin Bernard Scott was born on October 24, 1963, in Fort Bragg, North Carolina. He attended Governor John R. Rogers High School in Puyallup, Washington.

== College career ==
Scott enrolled at Stanford University to play college football for the Cardinal. He was a four-year letterman from 1983 to 1986.

== Professional career ==
After going undrafted in the 1987 NFL draft, Scott signed with the San Diego Chargers on May 10. He was placed on injured reserve on September 1 with a hurt hamstring and missed the entire 1987 season. He was placed on injured reserve again on August 20, 1988, and was released on December 7, 1998. Scott was re-signed by the Chargers on December 9 and played in one game in a reserve role without recording any statistics.

Scott became a free agent after the 1988 season and signed with the Dallas Cowboys on April 1, 1989. After starting fullback Broderick Sargent suffered an injury, the team's backfield was shifted around. The Cowboys planned to use Scott on passing downs. He was credited with a start in the 1989 season opener, catching four passes for 30 yards while also rushing once for negative three yards. He played in the first three games of the season overall for the Cowboys, totaling nine receptions for 63 yards on 15 targets and two carries for negative four yards. He was placed on injured reserve on September 26, 1989, missing the rest of the year. Scott was released on July 29, 1990, during training camp.
