= Joe Phillips (American football) =

American football player (born 1963)

No. 91, 75, 66
- Positions: Defensive tackle, defensive end

Personal information
- Born: July 15, 1963 (age 63); Portland, Oregon, U.S.
- Listed height: 6 ft 5 in (1.96 m)
- Listed weight: 298 lb (135 kg)

Career information
- High school: Columbia River (Vancouver, Washington)
- College: Oregon State, SMU
- NFL draft: 1986: 4th round, 93rd overall pick

Career history
- Minnesota Vikings (1986); San Diego Chargers (1987–1991); Kansas City Chiefs (1992–1997); St. Louis Rams (1998); Minnesota Vikings (1999)

Career NFL statistics
- Tackles: 399
- Sacks: 24.5
- Fumble recoveries: 6
- Stats at Pro Football Reference

Joseph Gordon Phillips (born July 15, 1963) is an American former professional football player who was a defensive tackle for 14 seasons in the National Football League (NFL). He played college football for the SMU Mustangs and was selected by the Minnesota Vikings in the fourth round of the 1986 NFL draft with the 93rd overall pick.

Phillips competed collegiately at Southern Methodist University, where he also was an All-American thrower for the SMU track and field team. Phillips placed 6th in the shot put at the 1985 NCAA Division I Indoor Track and Field Championships.

After his football career he became an attorney and talk show host. The USA Today All-Joe Team is named in his honor.
