= Les Miller (American football) =

American football player (born 1965)

No. 75, 69, 95
- Position: Defensive end

Personal information
- Born: March 1, 1965 (age 61); Arkansas City, Kansas, U.S.
- Listed height: 6 ft 7 in (2.01 m)
- Listed weight: 292 lb (132 kg)

Career information
- High school: Arkansas City
- College: Kansas State; Fort Hays State
- NFL draft: 1987: undrafted

Career history
- New Orleans Saints (1987)*; San Diego Chargers (1987–1990); New Orleans Saints (1991–1994); San Diego Chargers (1994); New Orleans Saints (1995)*; Carolina Panthers (1996–1998)
- * Offseason or practice squad member only

Awards and highlights
- First-team Little All-American (1986)

Career NFL statistics
- Tackles: 269
- Sacks: 20
- Fumble recoveries: 12
- Stats at Pro Football Reference

Leslie Paul Miller (born March 1, 1965) is an American former professional football player who was a defensive end for 12 seasons in the National Football League (NFL) for the San Diego Chargers, New Orleans Saints, and Carolina Panthers. He played college football for the Kansas State Wildcats and Fort Hays State Tigers, earning AP Little All-American honors.
