= Lou Brock Jr. =

American football player (born 1964)

No. 38, 28
- Position: Cornerback

Personal information
- Born: May 8, 1964 (age 62); Chicago, Illinois, U.S.
- Listed height: 5 ft 11 in (1.80 m)
- Listed weight: 175 lb (79 kg)

Career information
- High school: Ladue Horton Watkins (Ladue, Missouri)
- College: Southern California
- NFL draft: 1987: 2nd round, 53rd overall pick

Career history
- San Diego Chargers (1987); Seattle Seahawks (1988); Detroit Lions (1988); Los Angeles Rams (1989)*
- * Offseason or practice squad member only

Awards and highlights
- Second-team All-American (1986); Second-team All-Pac-10 (1986)
- Stats at Pro Football Reference

Louis Clark Brock Jr. (born May 8, 1964) is an American former professional football player who was a cornerback and safety in the National Football League (NFL).

== Early life ==
Brock was born in Chicago, Illinois and played scholastically at Ladue Horton Watkins High School in Ladue, Missouri, an affluent suburb of St. Louis. He played collegiately at the University of Southern California, where, as a senior, he was honored by the NEA/World Almanac as a second-team All-American.

== Professional career ==
Pre-draft measurables
| Height | Weight | Arm length | Hand span |
|---|---|---|---|
| 5 ft 10 5/8 in (1.79 m) | 163 lb (74 kg) | 31 1/4 in (0.79 m) | 9 1/2 in (0.24 m) |

Brock was drafted by the Chargers in the second round of the 1987 NFL Draft with the 53rd overall pick. He played one game for the San Diego Chargers in 1987, two games for the Detroit Lions in 1988, and one game for the Seattle Seahawks in 1988.

== Personal life ==
Brock later worked as an executive with the Sprint/Nextel Corporation.

He is the son of Hall of Fame baseball player Lou Brock.
