= Iron puddler =

Worker in iron manufacturing

An iron puddler (often merely puddler) was a worker in iron manufacturing who specialized in puddling, an improved process to convert pig iron into wrought iron with the use of a reverberatory furnace.

Working as a two-man crew, a puddler and helper could produce around 1.5 tons of iron in a 12-hour shift. The strenuous labor, heat and fumes caused puddlers to have a short life expectancy, with most dying in their thirties. Puddling was never automated because the puddler had to sense when the balls had "come to nature" — the point when molten pig iron begins to solidify into a malleable mass, allowing for removal from the furnace and further processing.

James J. Davis, who was born in Tredegar, Wales, emigrated to the United States, where he later became a prominent figure in government, serving as a U.S. Senator from Pennsylvania and as U.S. Secretary of Labor under three consecutive presidents. His book The Iron Puddler, describing his early experiences as a puddler, was ghostwritten by C. L. Edson.
