= Dan Rosado =

American football player (born 1959)

No. 66
- Position: Center

Personal information
- Born: July 6, 1959 (age 67); Lawton, Oklahoma, U.S.
- Listed height: 6 ft 3 in (1.91 m)
- Listed weight: 280 lb (127 kg)

Career information
- High school: Cherokee
- College: Northern Illinois
- NFL draft: 1981: undrafted

Career history
- Houston Gamblers (1985); Miami Dolphins (1986–1987)*; San Diego Chargers (1987–1988); Houston Oilers (1990)*
- * Offseason or practice squad member only
- Stats at Pro Football Reference

Daniel Peter Rosado (born July 6, 1959) is an American former professional football player who was a center for the San Diego Chargers of the National Football League (NFL). He played college football for the Northern Illinois Huskies. He also played in the United States Football League (USFL) for the Houston Gamblers and was a member of the Miami Dolphins.
