= Keyvan Jenkins =

American gridiron football player (born 1961)

No. 23
- Position: Running back

Personal information
- Born: January 6, 1961 (age 65); Stockton, California, U.S.

Career information
- College: UNLV

Career history
- 1984–1986: British Columbia Lions
- 1987: San Diego Chargers
- 1988: Kansas City Chiefs
- 1990–1993: Calgary Stampeders
- 1994: Sacramento Gold Miners

Awards and highlights
- 2× Grey Cup champion (1985, 1992); CFL All-Star (1985)
- Stats at Pro Football Reference

Keyvan Lewis Jenkins (born January 6, 1961) is a former running back who played eight seasons in the Canadian Football League (CFL). He also played two seasons in the National Football League (NFL). He won the Grey Cup for the BC Lions in 1985, and with the Calgary Stampeders in 1992.
