= Jeff Jackson (American football) =

American football player (born 1961)

No. 51, 58, 52, 42
- Position: Linebacker

Personal information
- Born: October 9, 1961 (age 65); Shreveport, Louisiana, U.S.
- Listed height: 6 ft 1 in (1.85 m)
- Listed weight: 230 lb (104 kg)

Career information
- High school: Griffin (Griffin, Georgia)
- College: Auburn (1980–1983)
- NFL draft: 1984: 8th round, 206th overall pick

Career history
- Atlanta Falcons (1984–1985); San Diego Chargers (1987–1988); Ottawa Rough Riders (1991–1992); BC Lions (1993)

Jeffery Paul Jackson (born October 9, 1961) is an American former professional football linebacker. He played college football for the Auburn Tigers and was selected by the Atlanta Falcons in the eighth round of the 1984 NFL draft. He played four seasons in the National Football League (NFL) for the Falcons and San Diego Chargers and three seasons in the Canadian Football League (CFL) for the Ottawa Rough Riders and BC Lions.
