= Walt Harris (defensive back) =

American football player (born 1964)

No. 46
- Position: Defensive back

Personal information
- Born: April 1, 1964 (age 62); Stockton, California, U.S.
- Listed height: 6 ft 1 in (1.85 m)
- Listed weight: 195 lb (88 kg)

Career information
- High school: Lodi (Lodi, California)
- College: Stanford

Career history
- San Diego Chargers (1987)

Awards and highlights
- Second-team All-Pac-10 (1986)
- Stats at Pro Football Reference

Walter Lee Harris (born April 1, 1964) is an American former professional football player who was a defensive back for the San Diego Chargers of the National Football League (NFL) in 1987. He played college football for the Stanford Cardinal.
