= Tim Moffett =

American football player (born 1962)

No. 83, 86
- Position: Wide receiver

Personal information
- Born: February 8, 1962 (age 64); Laurel, Mississippi, U.S.
- Listed height: 6 ft 2 in (1.88 m)
- Listed weight: 180 lb (82 kg)

Career information
- College: Ole Miss
- NFL draft: 1985: 3rd round, 79th overall pick

Career history
- Los Angeles Raiders (1985–1986); San Diego Chargers (1987)

Career NFL statistics
- Receptions: 16
- Receiving yards: 247
- Touchdowns: 1
- Stats at Pro Football Reference

Timothy Moffett (born February 8, 1962) is an American former professional football player who was a wide receiver in the National Football League (NFL) who played for the Los Angeles Raiders and San Diego Chargers. He played college football for the Ole Miss Rebels. He was selected by the Raiders in the third round of the 1985 NFL draft.
