= Daniel Hunter (gridiron football) =

American football player (born 1968)

No. 25, 27, 18
- Position: Defensive back

Personal information
- Born: September 1, 1962 (age 64); Arkadelphia, Arkansas, U.S.
- Listed height: 5 ft 11 in (1.80 m)
- Listed weight: 178 lb (81 kg)

Career information
- High school: Arkadelphia
- College: Henderson State
- NFL draft: 1984: undrafted

Career history
- Los Angeles Express (1984)*; Dallas Cowboys (1984)*; Denver Broncos (1985–1986); San Diego Chargers (1986–1987); Denver Broncos (1989)*; Ottawa Rough Riders (1989–1993); BC Lions (1993); Shreveport Pirates (1994)
- * Offseason or practice squad member only
- Stats at Pro Football Reference

Daniel Lewis Hunter (born September 1, 1962) is an American former professional football defensive back who played in the National Football League (NFL) and Canadian Football League (CFL). He played college football for the Henderson State Reddies.

== Early life ==
Daniel Lewis Hunter was born on September 1, 1962, in Arkadelphia, Arkansas. He participated in high school football and track at Arkadelphia High School.

== College career ==
Hunter enrolled at Henderson State University to play college football for the Reddies. He played cornerback for them from 1980 to 1983, and was also a "top" long jumper on the track team. He majored in physical education at Henderson State.

== Professional career ==
Hunter signed with the Los Angeles Express of the United States Football League (USFL) on February 17, 1984. He was released on February 22 before the start of the 1984 USFL season. In May 1984, he went undrafted in the 1984 NFL draft.

Hunter signed with the Dallas Cowboys on May 10, 1984. He was released on August 13 after the second preseason game of the 1984 preseason.

Hunter was signed by the Denver Broncos on February 27, 1985. On October 20 against the Seattle Seahawks, he made a 20-yard interception in overtime that set up the game-winning field goal. He played in all 16 games as a reserve cornerback during the 1985 season, recording one interception for 20 yards and two kick returns for 33 yards. Hunter led Denver in special teams tackles and was named the Broncos' special teams most valuable player. He appeared in ten games in 1986 as a backup safety before being released on November 14, 1986.

Hunter signed with the San Diego Chargers on November 20, 1986. He played in five games, starting two, at right cornerback for the Chargers during the 1986 season. He missed three games in 1987 due to the 1987 NFL players strike. On December 13, 1987, against the Pittsburgh Steelers, Steelers kicker Harry Newsome shanked a kickoff and Hunter fumbled the ball. Hunter said "If I didn't try to fair-catch it, they could have caught it themselves. The ball looked as if it was going over my head (but) when it got to its peak I guess the wind caught it and it kind of came straight down." He appeared in 12 games overall during the 1987 season as a reserve cornerback, posting one sack and returning one kick for no yards. He was waived on August 18, 1988, before the third preseason game.

Hunter signed with the Broncos again on June 14, 1989. He was released on August 21, 1989, after the second preseason game.

Hunter was signed by the Ottawa Rough Riders of the Canadian Football League (CFL) on August 30, 1989. He played in 56 games for the Rough Riders from 1989 to 1993 as a cornerback and defensive halfback.

On July 19, 1993, Hunter was "transferred" to the BC Lions after losing the halfback job to Brett Young. He played in four games for the Lions in 1993 but spent most of the year on the injured list.

Hunter signed with the expansion Shreveport Pirates of the CFL for the 1994 season. He played in 16 games for the Pirates in 1994 while spending some time on the injured list. He made $38,000 during the 1994 season. Hunter finished his CFL career with totals of 76 games played, 258 tackles, 18 interceptions, three sacks, and six fumble recoveries.
