= Terry Unrein =

American football player (born 1962)

No. 98
- Position: Defensive lineman

Personal information
- Born: October 24, 1962 (age 64); Brighton, Colorado, U.S.
- Listed height: 6 ft 5 in (1.96 m)
- Listed weight: 281 lb (127 kg)

Career information
- High school: Fort Lupton (Fort Lupton, Colorado)
- College: Colorado State
- NFL draft: 1986: 3rd round, 66th overall pick

Career history
- San Diego Chargers (1986–1987); San Francisco 49ers (1989)*
- * Offseason or practice squad member only

Awards and highlights
- First-team All-WAC (1985)

Career NFL statistics
- GP / GS: 21 / 9
- Sacks: 3
- Stats at Pro Football Reference

Terrance Lynn Unrein (born October 24, 1962) is an American former professional football player who was a nose tackle in the National Football League (NFL). He played college football for the Colorado State Rams before being selected in the third round (66th overall) of the 1986 NFL draft by the San Diego Chargers. After his football career, he became a sales executive.

== Early life ==
Unrein was born October 24, 1962, in Brighton, Colorado. He graduated from Colorado State with a B.B.A. in Business/Managerial Economics.

In 1985, he was named First-team All-Conference. He also competed in the 48th Blue–Gray Football Classic for the North team.

== Professional career ==
Unrein was selected in the third round (66th overall) of the 1986 NFL draft by the San Diego Chargers. He spent two seasons with the Chargers. While there, he appeared in 21 games with nine starts, seven as a rookie and two the following year. He also recorded three career sacks. In August 1988 he was waived by the Chargers.

In 1989, Unrein was in training camp with the San Francisco 49ers.

== Post-football career ==
Unrein spent 11 years working for Eagle Global Logistics (EGL) and CEVA Logistics in sales. He then spent two and a half years at SEKO. He was the hired as the VP of Global Sales for Crane Worldwide Logistics, a full-service air, ocean, trucking, customs brokerage and logistics company.

== Personal life ==
He is a distant cousin of former NFL defensive end Mitch Unrein.
