= Curtis Adams (American football) =

American football player (born 1962)

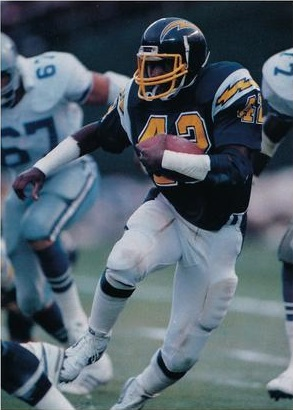
- Adams c. 1985

No. 42
- Position: Running back

Personal information
- Born: April 30, 1962 (age 64); Muskegon, Michigan, U.S.
- Listed height: 6 ft 0 in (1.83 m)
- Listed weight: 198 lb (90 kg)

Career information
- College: Central Michigan (1981–1984)
- NFL draft: 1985: 8th round, 207th overall pick

Career history
- San Diego Chargers (1985–1988); Los Angeles Raiders (1989)*; New York Jets (1990)*
- * Offseason or practice squad member only

Awards and highlights
- MAC Offensive Player of the Year (1982); Second-team All-American (1984)

Career NFL statistics
- Rushing yards: 907
- Rushing average: 3.5
- Touchdowns: 7
- Stats at Pro Football Reference

Curtis Ladonn Adams (born April 30, 1962) is an American former professional football player who was a running back for the San Diego Chargers of the National Football League (NFL). He played college football for the Central Michigan Chippewas.

== Early life ==
Adams was born on April 30, 1962, in Muskegon, Michigan. He attended Orchard View High School.

== College career ==
In 1982, Adams was a second-team All-American selection by the UPI and was named Mid-American Conference "Offensive Player of the Year". He was first in team all-MAC selection three straight years. Curtis gained 1,090, 1,431, and 1,204 yards in his final three seasons at Central Michigan. At Central Michigan, Adams set multiple school records:

1. most net yards gained rushing in a single game (238)
2. most rushing touchdowns in a single game
3. longest run from scrimmage (87)
4. career rushing yards (4,126) (third most in MAC history)
5. most career touchdowns (44) (also set a MAC record)

== Professional career ==
Drafted in the eighth round of the 1985 NFL draft by the San Diego Chargers, Curtis played four seasons in the NFL totaling 907 yards and seven touchdowns rushing and 76 yards on nine receptions. His best game in the NFL came on a nationally televised Thursday night game on November 20, 1986, against the Los Angeles Raiders. Although the Chargers lost, Curtis rushed 26 times for 93 yards and three touchdowns.
