= Frank Middleton (running back) =

American football player (born 1960)

No. 43, 30
- Position: Running back

Personal information
- Born: October 28, 1960 (age 66); Savannah, Georgia, U.S.
- Listed height: 5 ft 11 in (1.80 m)
- Listed weight: 205 lb (93 kg)

Career information
- High school: Johnson (Savannah)
- College: Florida A&M
- NFL draft: 1983: undrafted

Career history
- Seattle Seahawks (1983)*; Indianapolis Colts (1984–1985); Tampa Bay Buccaneers (1986)*; San Diego Chargers (1987); Miami Dolphins (1988)*
- * Offseason or practice squad member only

Career NFL statistics
- Rushing yards: 384
- Rushing average: 2.9
- Rushing touchdowns: 3
- Stats at Pro Football Reference

Franklin Middleton Jr. (born October 28, 1960) is an American former professional football player who was a running back in the National Football League (NFL) for the Indianapolis Colts and San Diego Chargers. He played college football for the Florida A&M Rattlers.
