= Martin Sartin =

American football player (1963–2021)

No. 35, 27
- Position: Running back

Personal information
- Born: March 9, 1963; Philadelphia, Pennsylvania, U.S.
- Died: August 13, 2021 (aged 58); Camden, New Jersey, U.S.
- Listed height: 5 ft 10 in (1.78 m)
- Listed weight: 202 lb (92 kg)

Career information
- High school: Camden
- College: Long Beach State
- NFL draft: 1986: undrafted

Career history
- Los Angeles Raiders (1986); San Diego Chargers (1987); Hamilton Tiger-Cats (1988); Edmonton Eskimos (1990)*
- * Offseason or practice squad member only
- Stats at Pro Football Reference

Martin Sartin (March 9, 1963 – August 13, 2021) was an American professional football running back who played for the San Diego Chargers of the National Football League (NFL). He played college football for the Long Beach State 49ers.

== Early life ==
Martin Sartin was born on March 9, 1963, in Philadelphia, Pennsylvania. He participated in high school football and track at Camden High School in Camden, New Jersey.

== College career ==
Sartin first played junior college football at the College of the Sequoias from 1982 to 1983. He then transferred to California State University, Long Beach, where he played for the Long Beach State 49ers from 1984 to 1985. In 1984, he rushed 90 times for 290 yards and five touchdowns while also catching ten passes for 77 yards. As a senior in 1985, Sartin recorded 103 carries for 441 yards and 12 touchdowns, and 27 receptions for 218 yards and one touchdown. He led the Pacific Coast Athletic Association with 13 touchdowns.

== Professional career ==
Sartin signed with the Los Angeles Raiders after going undrafted in the 1986 NFL draft. On August 18, 1986, he was placed on injured reserve, where he spent the entire 1986 season. He was released on September 1, 1987, before the start of the 1987 regular season.

On September 23, 1987, Sartin was signed by the San Diego Chargers during the 1987 NFL players strike. He played in all three strike games, starting one, for the Chargers, totaling 19 rushing attempts for 52 yards and one touchdown, six catches for 19 yards, and five kick returns for 117 yards. He was released on October 19, 1987, after the strike ended.

Sartin signed with the Hamilton Tiger-Cats of the Canadian Football League (CFL) on March 15, 1988. He played in nine games for the Tiger-Cats during the 1988 season, rushing 123 times for 460 yards and five touchdowns while catching 35 passes for 248 yards and three touchdowns. He led the team in all three rushing categories. Sartin was released on July 10, 1989, before the start of the 1989 regular season.

Sartin was signed to the Edmonton Eskimos' practice roster in October 1990. He became a free agent after the season.

== Personal life ==
Sartin later became a Camden County regional recruiter for the Family Service Foster Home Program. He was also a voluntary recruiter for the College of the Sequoias. He died on August 13, 2021, in Camden.
