= David Brandon (American football) =

American football player (born 1965)

No. 58, 51
- Position: Linebacker

Personal information
- Born: February 9, 1965 (age 61); Memphis, Tennessee, U.S.
- Listed height: 6 ft 4 in (1.93 m)
- Listed weight: 238 lb (108 kg)

Career information
- High school: Mitchell (Memphis)
- College: Memphis
- NFL draft: 1987: 3rd round, 60th overall pick

Career history
- Buffalo Bills (1987)*; San Diego Chargers (1987–1990); Cleveland Browns (1991–1993); Seattle Seahawks (1993-1994); San Diego Chargers (1995); Atlanta Falcons (1996–1997); Memphis Maniax (2001)
- * Offseason or practice squad member only

Career NFL statistics
- Tackles: 172
- Sacks: 7
- Interceptions: 4
- Stats at Pro Football Reference

David Sherrod Brandon (born February 9, 1965) is an American former professional football player who was a linebacker for 11 seasons for four teams in the National Football League (NFL). He was selected by the Buffalo Bills in the third round of the 1987 NFL draft. He was a 1986 2nd Team All-South Independent selection.

Pre-draft measurables
Height	Weight	Arm length	Hand span	40-yard dash	10-yard split	20-yard split	20-yard shuttle	Vertical jump	Broad jump	Bench press
6 ft 3 1/8 in (1.91 m)	223 lb (101 kg)	32 in (0.81 m)	9 in (0.23 m)	4.73 s	1.71 s	2.76 s	4.45 s	26.5 in (0.67 m)	9 ft 0 in (2.74 m)	9 reps
All values from NFL Combine

His oldest son Xzavian Brandon was a wide receiver at Minnesota and New Mexico State.

His youngest son Solomon Brandon is currently a defensive end at Gardner-Webb University.
