= Erie SeaWolves =

Pennsylvania minor league baseball team

- Founded in 1995; Erie, Pennsylvania

Team logo	Cap insignia

Minor league affiliations
- Class: Double-A (1999–present)
- Previous classes: Class A Short Season (1995–1998)
- League: Eastern League (1999–present)
- Division: Southwest Division
- Previous leagues: New York–Penn League (1995–1998)

Major league affiliations
- Team: Detroit Tigers (2001–present)
- Previous teams: Anaheim Angels (1999–2000) Pittsburgh Pirates (1995–1998)

Minor league titles
- League titles (2): 2023; 2024
- Division titles (10): 1997; 1999; 2001; 2007; 2019; 2022; 2023; 2024; 2025; 2026
- First-half titles (3): 2023; 2024; 2025
- Second-half titles (3): 2022; 2025; 2026

Team data
- Name: Erie SeaWolves (1995–present)
- Colors: Black, red, yellow, gray, white
- Ballpark: UPMC Park (1995–present)
- Owner/ Operator: Fernando Aguirre
- General manager: Greg Coleman
- Manager: Tony Cappuccilli
- Media: Erie Times-News; Erie News Now; Fox Sports Radio AM 1330
- Website: milb.com/erie

The Erie SeaWolves are an American professional baseball team based in Erie, Pennsylvania. They compete in Minor League Baseball (MiLB) in the Eastern League's Southwest Division and serve as the Double-A affiliate of the Detroit Tigers. The team was founded in 1989 and began playing in Erie in 1995. The SeaWolves currently play their home games at UPMC Park in downtown Erie, next door to Erie Insurance Arena and the Warner Theatre.

The "SeaWolves" name refers to the city's location along Lake Erie and their original affiliation with the Pittsburgh Pirates. "Sea wolf" is a historical epithet for sailors who engaged in piracy.

== History ==
The team was established in 1989 in Welland, Ontario, as a New York–Penn League member, initially known as the Welland Pirates and playing home games at Welland Stadium. After six challenging seasons, the team relocated to Erie after the previous baseball team, the Erie Sailors, exited. This move eventually led the Frontier League-affiliated club to settle in Johnstown, Pennsylvania, where they became the Johnstown Steal (currently known as the Florence Y'alls in Florence, Kentucky). Before this, the Sailors had played in the New York–Penn League but relocated to Wappingers Falls, New York, becoming the Hudson Valley Renegades, due to the team's owner, Marvin Goldklang, not upgrading Ainsworth Field to meet Major League Baseball standards.

After the civic government obtained an $8 million grant from the Commonwealth of Pennsylvania to construct UPMC Park (previously known as Jerry Uht Park), the Welland Pirates relocated to Erie. Although Erie did not have an affiliated baseball team in 1994, the city hosted an independent Frontier League franchise that revived the "Sailors" name. The SeaWolves eventually became the successor to several Erie-based baseball teams, including all iterations of the Sailors, with the New York–Penn League franchise now known as the State College Spikes.

=== Early years (1995–2001) ===
On June 20, 1995, the SeaWolves triumphed over the Jamestown Jammers in their inaugural game in Erie. José Guillén, a Major League Baseball alumnus from the Dominican Republic, hit the game-winning home run for the team.

The SeaWolves served as the Pittsburgh Pirates affiliate from 1995 to 1998. In 1999, the Eastern League expanded by two teams, granting Erie one of the new franchises. As a result, the team moved up from Short-Season A to Double-A. Despite the classification change, Minor League Baseball considered the current SeaWolves organization a continuation of the previous franchise. Erie was therefore allowed to keep the franchise’s New York–Penn League records and history. The Mahoning Valley Scrappers joined the New York–Penn League as a new expansion franchise rather than continuing the SeaWolves’ history. After the promotion to Double-A, the team affiliated with the Anaheim Angels. In 2001, the SeaWolves switched affiliations to the Detroit Tigers, with whom they continue to partner.

=== Realignment (2021) ===
As part of Major League Baseball's nationwide restructuring of Minor League Baseball in 2021, MLB reassigned the Erie SeaWolves to the newly created Double-A Northeast, which replaced the former Eastern League. The reorganization focused on player development and travel. As part of the changes, Major League Baseball ended dozens of affiliations, introduced facility standards, and shortened the Minor League season. The SeaWolves retained their affiliation with the Detroit Tigers and continued competing at the Double-A level. In 2022, Minor League Baseball reinstated traditional league names across all levels, restoring the "Eastern League" name for the SeaWolves' circuit.

=== Championships (2023–2024) ===
On September 26, 2023, the SeaWolves completed a full playoff sweep, capped by a 10–0 win over the Binghamton Rumble Ponies in Game 2 of the Eastern League Championship Series, earning their first championship in franchise history.

On September 24, 2024, the SeaWolves completed their playoff run by defeating the Somerset Patriots 3-2 in Bridgewater, New Jersey. They won the Eastern League championship for a second straight year. In addition, they became the 11th team in Eastern League history and the first since the Trenton Thunder in 2007 and 2008 to repeat as champions.

=== Additional historical notes ===
Between 2018 and 2022, the franchise undertook a series of infrastructure improvements at UPMC Park, supported in part by a $12 million Redevelopment Assistance Capital Program (RACP) grant from the Commonwealth of Pennsylvania. These renovations aimed to meet updated Minor League Baseball facility standards and improve the spectator experience.

In 2025, the SeaWolves clinched their third consecutive first-half division title on June 21 with a 2–0 win over the Bowie Baysox. Right-hander Austin Bergner started the game and gave up one hit over five innings.

== Ownership ==
Palisades Baseball originally owned the SeaWolves when the team began play in 1995. In 2003, Palisades sold the team to Mandalay Sports Entertainment, which had previously owned and operated several Minor League Baseball clubs. On March 27, 2015, the SeaWolves announced that Fernando Aguirre had purchased the team and would serve as its new owner. A seasoned executive from Procter & Gamble (P&G) and Chiquita Brands International, Aguirre purchased the team from Mandalay for an undisclosed amount and expressed his commitment to keeping the team in Erie. Aguirre also holds a minority share in the Cincinnati Reds of Major League Baseball and possesses a one-third stake in the Myrtle Beach Pelicans, the Single-A affiliate of the Chicago Cubs in the Carolina League.

== Logos and uniforms ==
The SeaWolves' primary colors are black, red, and white, complemented by minor accents of gold and gray. Their primary logo features a stylized "pirate wolf" positioned above two intersecting baseball bats with sword hilts. The wordmark arches to match the wolf's tricorne, using a color scheme of white, black, and gold. Additionally, the SeaWolves have a secondary logo depicting a weathered Jolly Roger on a "bat sword," highlighted by a red letter E. This emblem pays homage to Erie's nickname, "Flagship City," which references the Flagship Niagara, commanded by Commodore Oliver Hazard Perry during his 1813 victory over the British Royal Navy in the Battle of Lake Erie.

The home uniforms feature a black cap with the "bandanna wolf" logo and white jerseys with black piping. The "SeaWolves" wordmark arches across the front in black letters outlined in red, and the crossed "bat swords" logo appears on the left sleeve. The away uniforms feature a gray jersey with black piping, displaying the "Erie" wordmark in red with a black outline and the crossed "bat swords" logo on the left sleeve. Additionally, the alternate jersey is red with black piping and features the "Erie" wordmark in white, outlined in black, with the "tricorne wolf" logo on the left sleeve.

1995–1998

1999–2000

2001–2012

2013–present

2025–present

== Culture ==
=== Last Week Tonight with John Oliver ===
In 2025, comedian John Oliver announced on the HBO series Last Week Tonight with John Oliver that the show selected the Seawolves to undergo a full rebranding, including a new name, mascot, and theme night. The chosen alternate identity, Erie Moon Mammoths, was selected in honor of the 1991 discovery of mammoth bones in Lake Pleasant by local scuba diver George Moon. A new mascot, Fuzz E. Mammoth, a purple mammoth in an astronaut helmet, was also created. The SeaWolves played as the Moon Mammoths for four games in 2025.

=== Mascots ===
C. Wolf with a youth softball player in June 2015

The Erie SeaWolves' official mascot is an anthropomorphic gray lupine named C. Wolf. He wears the team's official red alternate jersey, accompanied by a pirate hat, a red and white bandana, and an eye patch. His friends include Paws (the Detroit Tigers' official mascot) as well as three anthropomorphic sausages sponsored by the Erie-based Smith's Provision Company: Kenny Kielbasa, Herbie Hot Dog, and Santino the Italian Sausage. While playing under the Erie Moon Mammoths branding, the team's mascot is a purple woolly mammoth named Fuzz E. Mammoth.

=== Promotions ===
==== Alternative Facts Night ====
On March 10, 2017, the Erie SeaWolves made national headlines for their "Alternative Facts Night" promotion on Friday, August 25, 2017. Their opponent was the Akron RubberDucks, whose alternative name was the "Akron Yellow Bath Toys" for the game. The promotion was a reference to a news story in which Kellyanne Conway, counselor to U.S. president, Donald Trump, coined the phrase "alternative facts" to bolster a disputed claim that more people attended Trump's presidential inauguration on January 20, 2017, than the first inauguration of Barack Obama on January 20, 2009. The SeaWolves hosted Alternative Facts Night to "celebrate facts that the team knows to be true—even if some media outlets may dispute them." As part of the promotion, the first 1,000 fans received a 2016 SeaWolves Eastern League Championship ring, although the RubberDucks earned the title. The club had notional expectations of 1.2 million fans attending the game between Erie and Akron, despite UPMC Park having a seating capacity of only 6,000. The proceeds for Alternative Facts Night went to the Erie City School District.

In anticipation of "Alternative Facts Night," Fernando Aguirre authored a post on Twitter reading, "This is huge! #AlternativeFactsNight. We will build a [right field] wall, and Akron will pay for it. I promise." This was a parody of Donald Trump's political campaign, in which he stated, "I would build a great wall, and nobody builds walls better than me, believe me, and I'll build them very inexpensively—I will build a great, great wall on our southern border. And I will have Mexico pay for that wall. Mark my words."

=== Community service ===
The SeaWolves engage in many philanthropic efforts throughout Erie and its surrounding communities. Key team initiatives include UPMC Health Plan Paint the Park Pink Weekend to benefit local cancer charities, Northwest Bank Gloves for Kids equipment drive, and Sensory-Friendly Day at the Ballpark in partnership with the Autism Society of Northwest Pennsylvania. The team also sponsors youth sports and education programs through the SeaWolves Community Fund. On September 16, 2015, the SeaWolves earned the Erie Times-News Commitment to Erie Award for community service by a business with 50 or fewer employees.

== Broadcasting ==
In February 2017, the SeaWolves extended their broadcasting contract with Fox Sports Radio AM 1330: The Fan, a local affiliate of Connoisseur Media, to air every game during the 2017 and 2018 seasons. Greg Gania served as the Voice of the SeaWolves from 2006-2025 and was the longest-tenured play-by-play broadcaster in team history. Zach Surdenik and Luke Burgess currently serve as the broadcast team.

== Season-by-season results ==
=== Season results in New York–Penn League ===
==== Regular season ====
Welland Pirates – 1989–1994
Season	Affiliation	Manager	Record
1989	Pirates	U. L. Washington	32–44, 5th place Stedler
1990	Pirates	Jack Lind	36–42, 3rd place Stedler
1991	Pirates	Lee Driggers	30–47, 6th place Stedler
1992	Pirates	Trent Jewett	31–46, 6th place Stedler
1993	Pirates	Larry Smith	35–42, 5th place Stedler
1994	Pirates	Jeff Banister	30–44, 4th place Stedler

Erie SeaWolves – 1995–1998
Season	Affiliation	Manager	Record
1995	Pirates	Scott Little	34–41, 3rd place Stedler
1996	Pirates	Jeff Richardson	30–46, 4th place Stedler
1997	Pirates	Marty Brown	50–26, 1st place Stedler
1998	Pirates	Tracy Woodson	26–50, 4th place Stedler

=== Season results in Eastern League ===
==== Regular season ====
Erie SeaWolves – 1999–present
Season	Affiliation	Manager	Record
1999	Angels	Garry Templeton	81–61, 1st place South
2000	Angels	Don Wakamatsu	47–94, 6th place South
2001	Tigers	Luis Pujols	84–58, 1st place South
2002	Tigers	Kevin Bradshaw	52–89, 6th place South
2003	Tigers	Kevin Bradshaw	72–70, 3rd place South
2004	Tigers	Rick Sweet	80–62, 2nd place South
2005	Tigers	Duffy Dyer	63–79, 6th place South
2006	Tigers	Duffy Dyer	60–81, 6th place South
2007	Tigers	Matt Walbeck	81–59, 1st place South
2008	Tigers	Tom Brookens	68–74, 4th place South
2009	Tigers	Tom Brookens	71–70, 4th place South
2010	Tigers	Phil Nevin	66–76, 6th place West
2011	Tigers	Chris Cron	67–75, 5th place West
2012	Tigers	Chris Cron	57–84, 6th place West
2013	Tigers	Chris Cron	76–66, 2nd place West
2014	Tigers	Lance Parrish	71–71, 4th place West
2015	Tigers	Lance Parrish	64–78, 6th place West
2016	Tigers	Lance Parrish	62–79, 4th place West
2017	Tigers	Lance Parrish	65–75, 4th place West
2018	Tigers	Andrew Graham	63–77, 5th place West
2019	Tigers	Mike Rabelo	77–61, 1st place West
2020	Tigers	Season cancelled due to COVID-19 pandemic	
2021	Tigers	Arnie Beyeler	64–55, 3rd place Southwest
2022	Tigers	Gabe Alvarez	80–58, 1st place Southwest
2023	Tigers	Gabe Alvarez	75–62, 1st place Southwest
2024	Tigers	Gabe Alvarez	77–58, 2nd place Southwest
2025	Tigers	Andrew Graham	84–54, 1st place Southwest
2026	Tigers	Tony Cappuccilli	79–58, 1st place Southwest

== Playoffs ==
Season	Semifinals	League Finals
1997	L, 2–0, Pittsfield Mets	-
1999	L, 3–1, Harrisburg Senators	-
2001	L, 3–1, Reading Phillies	-
2004	L, 3–0, Altoona Curve	-
2007	L, 3–1, Akron Aeros	-
2013	L, 3–1, Harrisburg Senators	-
2022	W, 2–0 Richmond Flying Squirrels	L, 2–1, Somerset Patriots
2023	W, 2–0 Richmond Flying Squirrels	W, 2–0, Binghamton Rumble Ponies
2024	W, 2–1 Akron RubberDucks	W, 2–0 Somerset Patriots
2025	W, 2–1 Altoona Curve	L, 2–1 Binghamton Rumble Ponies
2026	W, 2–0 Richmond Flying Squirrels	L, 2–0 Reading Fightin Phils

== Roster ==
Erie SeaWolves roster
Players		Coaches/Other
Pitchers: 20 Max Alba; 32 Zane Barnhart; 38 Wandisson Charles; 41 Lucas Elissalt; 20 Colin Fields; 35 Dylan File; 49 Dariel Fregio; 33 Marco Jimenez; 21 Tanner Kohlhepp; 27 Trevin Michael; 33 Jake Miller *; 40 Joe Miller; 14 Carlos Peña; 31 Moises Rodriguez; 45 Yosber Sanchez; 10 Kenny Serwa; 15 Eric Silva; 30 Johan Simon; 51 Luke Taggart	Catchers: 29 Ricardo Hurtado; 6 Luke Shliger; Infielders: 23 Clayton Campbell; 3 E.J. Exposito; 24 Peyton Graham; 16 Woody Hadeen; 26 Andrew Jenkins; 37 Izaac Pacheco; 33 Viandel Pena; Outfielders: 18 Roberto Campos; 36 Zyhir Hope; 11 Patrick Lee; 35 Chris Meyers; 1 Seth Stephenson	Manager: -- Tony Cappuccilli; Coaches: -- Nick Franklin (bench); -- Nick Green (pitching); -- Kyle MacKinnon (hitting); 60-day injured list: -- Garrett Burhenn (full season); -- Jaden Hamm; -- Joseph Montalvo; -- Jack Penney (full season); 35 Garrett Pennington; 7-day injured list; * On Detroit Tigers 40-man roster; ~ Development list; # Rehab assignment; ∞ Reserve list; ‡ Restricted list; § Suspended list; † Temporarily inactive list; Roster updated September 28, 2026; Transactions; → More rosters: MiLB • Eastern League; → Detroit Tigers minor league players

== Retired numbers ==
Sam Jethroe	Jackie Robinson
CF; Retired by the Erie SeaWolves on June 6, 2005	2B; Retired throughout professional baseball on April 15, 1997

Awards and achievements
Preceded by Somerset Patriots; 2022	Eastern League champions 2023, 2024	Succeeded by Incumbent
