= Skylands Stadium =

Baseball park in Augusta, New Jersey, US

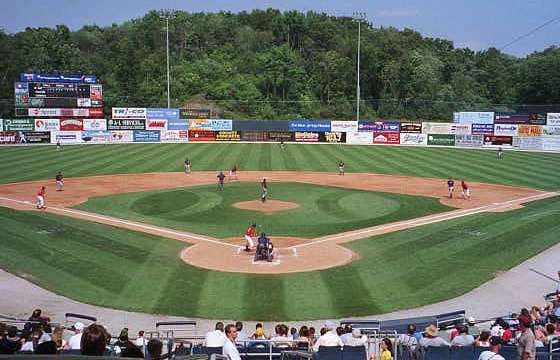
- Interactive map of Skylands Stadium
- Former names: Skylands Park
- Location: 94 Championship Place; Augusta, NJ 07822
- Coordinates: 41°7′33.3″N 74°42′36.44″W
- Owner: Al Dorso
- Operator: Skylands Stadium LLC.
- Capacity: 4,200 (4,500 with standing room)
- Surface: Natural Grass
- Record attendance: 5,576 (July 4, 2025)
- Field size: Left Field: 330 feet Center Field: 384 feet Right Field: 330 feet

Construction
- Built: 1994
- Opened: 1994

Tenants
- Sussex County Miners (NAPB) (2015–present); Sussex Skyhawks (CAAPB) (2006–2010); Newark Bears (ALPB) (1999); New Jersey Cardinals (NYPL) (1994–2005); Sussex County Community College Skylanders; NJIT Highlanders (NCAA Division 1) (2019–present)

Skylands Stadium is a baseball stadium located in the Augusta section of Frankford Township in Sussex County, New Jersey, that is home to the Sussex County Miners of the National Association of Professional Baseball (NAPB). It features 4,200 seats, and is located off of US 206, near its intersection with Route 15, on a plot of land adjacent to the Sussex County Fairgrounds where the Sussex County Farm and Horse Show and the New Jersey State Fair are held concurrently every August.

Skylands Stadium opened in 1994 and was built for the New Jersey Cardinals, the New York–Penn League affiliate for the St. Louis Cardinals. The Cardinals called the park home until 2005, after which the team was sold and moved. The Cardinals were replaced by the Sussex Skyhawks, an independent minor league team that began play in 2006 and folded after the 2010 season. Skylands Stadium also served as the home field for several other sports organizations.

In October 2013, Skylands Stadium was purchased by Al Dorso, a businessman who owns State Fair Superstore in Belleville, New Jersey, operates the annual State Fair Meadowlands in the parking lots surrounding MetLife Stadium, and is the owner of the Sussex County Miners.

In October 2021, the field at Skylands Stadium was renamed Columbus Field and a monument to Christopher Columbus, that was previously located in Newark, New Jersey, was placed in the front of the stadium. The statue and field naming were unveiled as part of a Columbus Day celebration with food, music, giveaways, and appearances by local politicians, Italian American organizations, and the Knights of Columbus.

On December 31, 2023, longtime Sussex County Miners broadcaster Bret Leuthner, who had served as the voice of the team since 2017, died after a battle with cancer. In his honor, on May 11, 2024, the broadcasting booth at Skylands Stadium was renamed the "Bret Leuthner Broadcasting Booth". This little segment was made by his son, Trevor Leuthner

== History ==
=== Home of the New Jersey Cardinals (1993–2005) ===
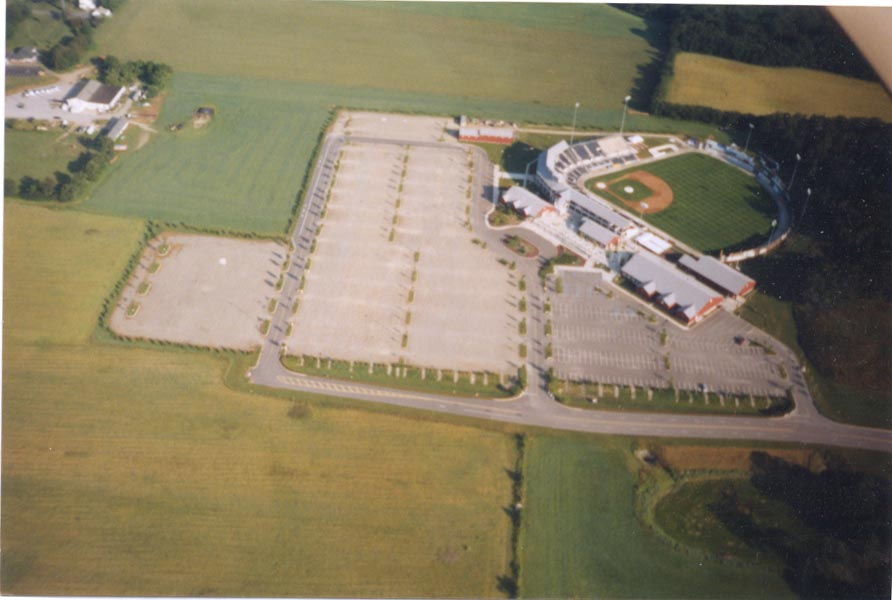
Skylands Stadium from an aerial view

Ground was broken in the fall of 1993 for a new minor league ballpark. The Hamilton Redbirds, the Cardinals' New York–Penn League affiliate, were in a transition to move out of their home in Hamilton, Ontario, to Augusta, New Jersey, and had temporarily spent the 1993 season in Glens Falls, New York, as the Glens Falls Redbirds. As part of the move, the team changed its name to the Cardinals. The team's new home stadium would be privately owned and financed, a rarity in professional sports circles.

The park is designed to look a little bit like a farm complex from the outside. Augusta has long been the home of dairy farms, and the Cardinals wanted to make their stadium blend in.

The winter of 1993–94 brought the worst weather in several years to North Jersey, causing construction cost overruns. The owners of Skylands Stadium were forced to file for Chapter 11 bankruptcy, but the new ballpark managed to open on time that June and the Cardinals moved in. The stadium's luxury boxes and other amenities were not completed until the following year.

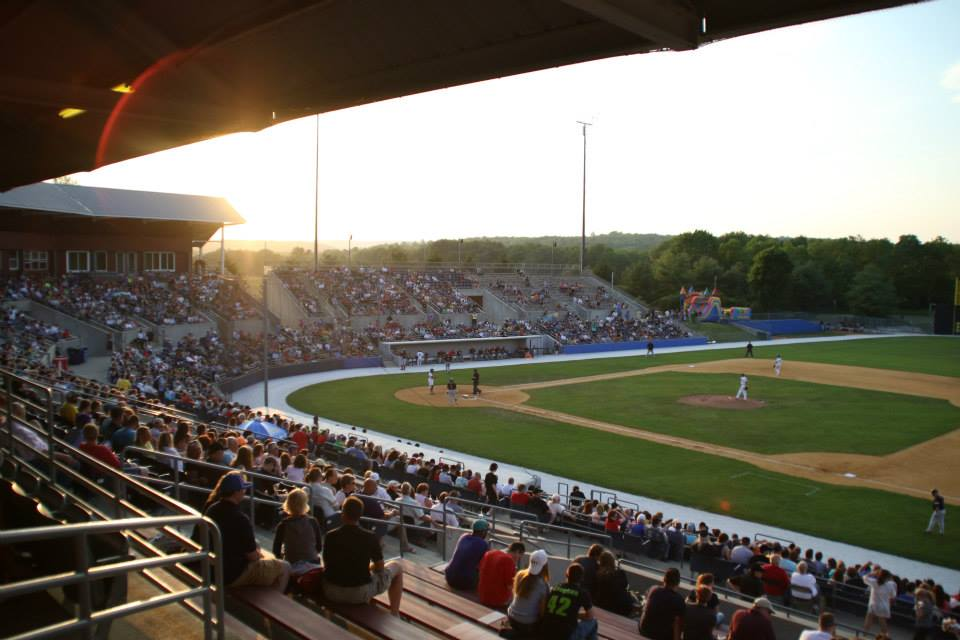
The interior of Skylands Stadium during a Miners game

The Cardinals called Skylands Stadium home from 1994 to 2005, winning a NYPL title in their first season. After the 2005 season the team was sold to a new ownership group based in University Park, Pennsylvania, home of Penn State University, and were relocated there to become known as the State College Spikes; the team remained there until the New York-Penn League was shut down in 2020.

=== Home of the Sussex Skyhawks (2006–2010) ===
On January 10, 2006, it was announced that Skylands Stadium would be the home to the newly named professional baseball team called the Sussex Skyhawks of the Can-Am League. On May 29, 2006, the Skyhawks played their first regular season game at Skylands Stadium, dropping an 18–11 decision to the North Shore Spirit. The Skyhawks won a Can-Am League championship in 2008, the ballpark's second title. In early January 2011, it was announced that the Sussex Skyhawks would be disbanding.

=== Other teams ===
The Sussex County Community College (SCCC) baseball team, known as the Skylanders, plays its home games at Skylands Stadium. The Skylanders took part in the first-ever event at the ballpark, a doubleheader played on April 17, 1994. The Skyland Cardinals have also begun to play their home games in 2020 with the emergence of the All-American Baseball Challenge.

In 1998, Skylands Stadium was designated the home field for the New Jersey Diamonds of the Ladies Professional Baseball League, a league for women that began play the previous year. However, the Diamonds played only eight home games before the league folded.

In the summer of 1999, Skylands Stadium hosted several home games for the Newark Bears, a minor league team affiliated with the Atlantic League, as they awaited the completion of Bears and Eagles Riverfront Stadium in Newark.

Skylands Stadium also hosted the Sussex County Colonels of the Atlantic Collegiate Baseball League, a collegiate summer baseball league, from 1995 to 1997. Skylands Stadium was also home to the Semi-Pro Football team the Sussex Stags. The Stags played at the stadium in 2010 when they were called the Jersey Stags. In 2015, the Stags re-branded as the Sussex Stags and played the 2015 season at Skylands Stadium while being part of the Empire Football League, the oldest running league in the Country. The Sussex Stags now call Newton High School the home stadium and in 2019 became the New Jersey Stags.

No professional baseball team played at Skylands Stadium from 2011 through 2014. The owners, Millennium Sports Management, put the stadium up for sale for $1.99 million, but no buyer was found at that price. In March 2013, investor Mark Roscioli of 17 Mile LLC in Ardmore, Pennsylvania acquired the stadium for $950,000. Negotiations were ongoing to determine how to bring baseball back to the site with either a new or existing pro league. Roscioli did not have prior experience running a ballpark. There was interest in a new ACBL franchise or a team in a revived version of the Northern League. In October 2014, Roscioli sold the park to a group of investors led by Al Dorso for $850,000.

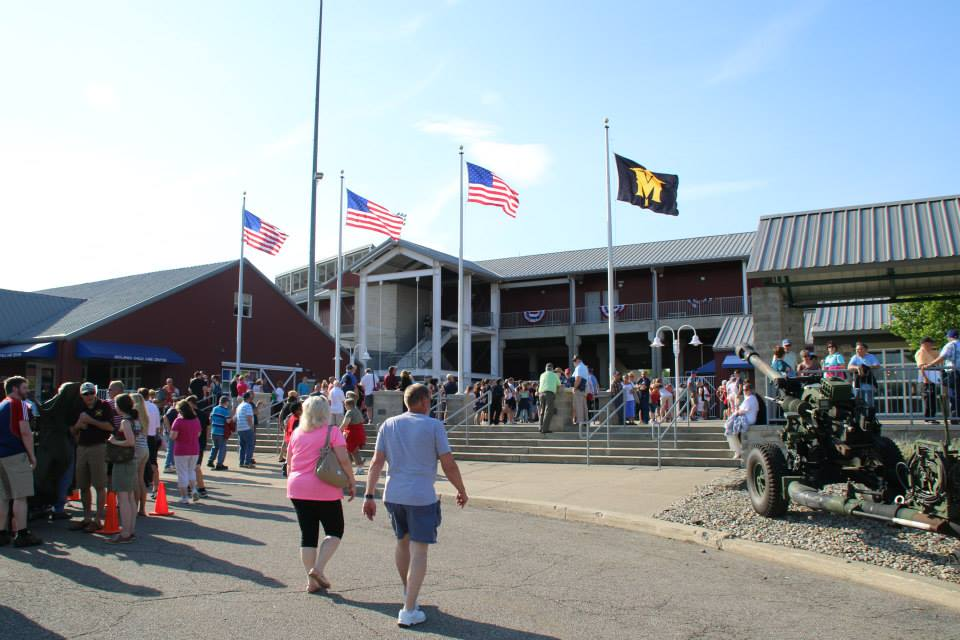
The front entrance of Skylands Stadium

=== Home of the Sussex County Miners (2015–present) ===
The Can-Am League granted an expansion franchise to the new ballpark owners. The new Sussex County Miners played their first home game on Memorial Day, May 25, 2015. The Miners defeated their geographical rivals, the New Jersey Jackals 4–1 in front of a crowd of 3,819 people for their first victory. In 2017, the Miners qualified for the playoffs for the first time in franchise history, playing their first playoff game at the stadium on September 7, 2017. However, the Miners got swept in the first round 3–0 by the eventual champions, the Québec Capitales.

The Miners qualified for the playoffs again the following year, this time placing first in the league and winning the division for the first time in franchise history. In the opening round, they defeated the Trois-Rivières Aigles 3–2.

In the championship round, the Miners beat the defending champion Québec Capitales 3 games to 1 in a best-of-five series. Skylands Stadium served as the location for games 3 and 4, each resulting in a walk-off hit in the bottom of the ninth inning. The Miners won Game 3 on a single by first baseman Daniel Mateo. Game 4 was filled with even more drama. With the Miners down two runs with two on and two out with a sold out crowd, the Miners third baseman Martin Figueroa stepped to the plate to hit a dramatic first-pitch, three-run home run, ending the game with a score of 6-5 and giving the Miners their first championship in franchise history.

On Sunday, June 16, 2019, the Sussex County Miners defeated the Shikoku Island Independents by a score of 5–2, exactly 25 years to the date of the first professional game played at Skylands Park which was between the New Jersey Cardinals and Hudson Valley Renegades.

After the 2019 season, the Can-Am League ceased operations, with the Miners and other teams slated to join the Frontier League. However, due to the COVID-19 pandemic, the Frontier League cancelled its 2020 season. The Miners instead fielded a team in the hastily assembled All-American Baseball Challenge, hosting games at Skylands Stadium despite a limit of 500 fans due to pandemic restrictions. The Miners officially began play in the Frontier League in May 2021.
