= Glens Falls Redbirds =

- 1993; Glens Falls, New York

Minor league affiliations
- Class: Short-Season A (1993)
- League: New York–Penn League (1993)
- Division: McNamara

Major league affiliations
- Team: St. Louis Cardinals (1993)

Team data
- Name: Glens Falls Redbirds (1993)
- Ballpark: East Field (1993)

The Glens Falls Redbirds were a minor league baseball team that played in the New York–Penn League for the 1993 season only and played their home games at East Field located in Glens Falls, New York. The Redbirds were affiliated with the St. Louis Cardinals.

== History ==
The Redbirds were founded in 1981 as the Erie Cardinals which were also a Cardinals' affiliate which played at Ainsworth Field in Erie, Pennsylvania from 1981 to 1987. The Erie Cardinals were then relocated to Hamilton, Ontario to become the Hamilton Redbirds. The team remained as a Cardinals' affiliate.

The team then played at Bernie Arbour Memorial Stadium in the city of Hamilton from 1988 to 1992 and then relocated again to the city of Glens Falls, retaining the Redbirds name and Cardinals affiliation. The team relocated again to Skylands Park located in Augusta, New Jersey in Sussex County for the 1994 season to become the New Jersey Cardinals.

Today, the team is now known as the State College Spikes and are now playing at Medlar Field at Lubrano Park located in University Park, Pennsylvania, located right outside of State College, Pennsylvania.
