= New Jersey Cardinals =

- 1994–2005; Augusta, New Jersey

Minor league affiliations
- Previous classes: Short-Season A
- League: New York–Penn League

Major league affiliations
- Previous teams: St. Louis Cardinals (1981–2005); Philadelphia Phillies (1972–1977); Minnesota Twins (1967–1971); New York Mets (1962–1966); New York Yankees (1958–1961)

Minor league titles
- League titles: 1 (1994)
- Division titles: 1 (1994)

Team data
- Previous names: New Jersey Cardinals (1994–2005); Glens Falls Redbirds (1993); Hamilton Redbirds (1988–1992); Erie Cardinals (1981–1987); Auburn Americans (1980); Auburn Red Stars (1979); Auburn Sunsets (1978); Auburn Phillies (1972–1977); Auburn Twins (1967–1971); Auburn Mets (1962–1966); Auburn Yankees (1958–1961)
- Previous parks: Skylands Park

The New Jersey Cardinals were a Short-Season A minor league baseball team affiliated with the St. Louis Cardinals. They were a member of the New York–Penn League and played at Skylands Park in Augusta, New Jersey from 1994–2005.

== History ==
The team's origins began in 1981 as the Erie Cardinals which were also a Cardinals' affiliate which played at Ainsworth Field in Erie, Pennsylvania from 1981–1987. The Erie Cardinals were then relocated to Hamilton, Ontario to become the Hamilton Redbirds by Albany businessman Joe Vellano. After the relocation, the team remained as a Cardinals' affiliate. The team played in Hamilton, Ontario from 1988–1992. In 1991, Vellano sold the Redbirds to a limited partnership headed by Barry Gordon and Marc Klee. Gordon and Klee planned to relocate the team to New Jersey where partner Rob Hillard was heading up management of the stadium. The Redbirds spent a lame duck season in Hamilton.

In the interim, the team relocated to Glens Falls, New York to become the Glens Falls Redbirds where former owner Jack Tracz managed the interim operation. The team played at East Field for the 1993 season only. After the 1993 season, the Glens Falls Redbirds relocated to Sussex County, NJ to become the New Jersey Cardinals, despite construction delays and apparent mismanagement by the stadium group which filed for Chapter 11 bankruptcy 120 days before the start of the season. The new park opened on schedule in large part due to the ownership and management of the Cardinals which was headed by Gordon and Klee's general manager Tony Torre. Torre partnered with a prominent local attorney, Kevin Kelly and the two kept the project moving along with Gordon and Klee's open checkbook. The New Jersey Cardinals put together a 43–32 regular-season mark, and then defeated the Jamestown Jammers, 2 games to 1, and the Auburn Astros, 2 games to 0, to win the league title. The achievement was culminated when Torre approached Frankford township mayor Carol Ann Kristensen to change the club's official address to "94 Championship Place". The Cardinals had one of their best player drafts the following year, and several future stars, including Matt Morris, passed through Augusta in 1995.

Over the next nine seasons, however, the Cardinals experienced only one more winning season, going 39–37 in 2002, before their relocation. While the team suffered through several losing seasons, they quietly established new standards for Minor League Baseball attendance. Utica Blue Sox owner and former Minnesota Twins beat writer Bob Fowler once said, "The Cardinals through Torre took the NY-Penn League to new standards." In 2004, the Cards made a late-season run and finished with a 41–34 record, but still failed to qualify for the league playoffs. In spite an incomplete ballpark the New Jersey Cardinals shattered the NY-Penn League attendance record in 1994, a record that was established in 1947 when the league played a 120-game schedule. The following season the Cardinals attendance soared averaging 4,700 fans per game in their 4,200 seat park. The club continued to draw well drawing 1 million fans faster than any team in NY-Penn League history. The only general manager in the club's 12-year history, Torre popularized the utilization of split double headers and a number of innovative promotions including the Headless Bobble Head Doll, color TV giveaways and ethnic entertainment. At one point the Streit & Smith Sports & Business Journal listed Skylands Park in the Top 25 professional facilities in North America with attendance beyond their seating capacity.

With the arrival of competition in the form of additional teams in the New York metropolitan area and further stadium mismanagement attendance began to slip. The Cardinals drew a league-leading 142,417 fans in their inaugural season, following that up with 157,557 in 1995, but 115,342 in 2004. The team produced a number of Major League stars including Matt Morris, Dan Haren, Coco Crisp, Adam Kennedy, Eliezer Alfonzo, Skip Schumaker and NFL quarterback Chad Hutchinson.

== Relocation ==
Following the 2005 season, the owners agreed to sell the New Jersey Cardinals. The group that purchased the team is headed by the principal partners of the Altoona Curve, a Double-A Eastern League baseball team. The new owners relocated the New Jersey Cardinals to the brand new, 6,000-seat Medlar Field in University Park, Pennsylvania which is located right outside of State College, Pennsylvania, where the team would play at in the 2006 season. After the relocation, the New Jersey Cardinals were then renamed the State College Spikes. Following the first year of the franchise as the Spikes, the St. Louis Cardinals switched affiliations to the Batavia Muckdogs, a former affiliate of the Philadelphia Phillies. The Spikes then became the Class-A Short Season affiliate of the Pittsburgh Pirates which lasted from 2006–2012. The Spikes switched affiliations from the Pirates back to the Cardinals for the 2013 season.

== Notable alumni ==
- Coco Crisp (2000)
- Dan Haren (2001) 3 x MLB All-Star
- Chad Hutchinson (1998) NFL Quarterback
- Adam Kennedy (1997)
- Matt Morris (1995) 2 x MLB All-Star
- Jose Oquendo (1998, MGR)
- Brendan Ryan (2003)
- Skip Schumaker (1998)

== Season records ==
Season	Affiliation	Manager	Record
1994	Cardinals	Roy Silver	43–32, 1st place McNamara
1995	Cardinals	Luis Meléndez	35–41, 3rd place McNamara
1996	Cardinals	Scott Melvin	28–47, 5th place McNamara
1997	Cardinals	Jeff Shireman	35–39, 3rd place McNamara
1998	Cardinals	Jose Oquendo	34–41, 4th place McNamara
1999	Cardinals	Jeff Shireman	30–46, 8th place Stedler
2000	Cardinals	Jeff Shireman	31–45, 6th place Pinckney
2001	Cardinals	Brian Rupp	35–41, 5th place McNamara
2002	Cardinals	Tommy Shields	39–37, 3rd place McNamara
2003	Cardinals	Tommy Shields	31–42, 5th place McNamara
2004	Cardinals	Tommy Shields	41–34, 2nd place McNamara
2005	Cardinals	Mark DeJohn	37–39, 5th place McNamara

=== Postseason records ===
- 1994: defeated Jamestown Jammers, 2 games to 1; defeated Auburn Astros, 2 games to 0, for league championship
