= State College Spikes =

- Founded in 1958 in Auburn, New York; Based in State College, Pennsylvania since 2006
Team logo
Cap insignia

Minor league affiliations
- Class: Collegiate summer (2021–present)
- Previous classes: Class A Short Season (1966–2020); Class A (1963–1965); Class D (1958–1962)
- League: MLB Draft League (2021–present)
- Previous leagues: New York–Penn League (1958–2020)

Major league affiliations
- Team: Unaffiliated (2021–present)
- Previous teams: St. Louis Cardinals (2013–2020); Pittsburgh Pirates (2007–2012); St. Louis Cardinals (1981–2006); Philadelphia Phillies (1972–1977); Minnesota Twins (1967–1971); New York Mets (1962–1966); New York Yankees (1958–1961)

Minor league titles
- League titles (9): 1962; 1964; 1966; 1967; 1970; 1973; 1994; 2014; 2016
- Division titles (4): 1992; 2013; 2014; 2016

Team data
- Name: State College Spikes (2006–present)
- Previous names: New Jersey Cardinals (1994–2005); Glens Falls Redbirds (1993); Hamilton Redbirds (1988–1992); Erie Cardinals (1981–1987); Auburn Americans (1980); Auburn Red Stars (1979); Auburn Sunsets (1978); Auburn Phillies (1972–1977); Auburn Twins (1967–1971); Auburn Mets (1962–1966); Auburn Yankees (1958–1961)
- Colors: Penn State navy, cardinal red, old gold, moonlight yellow, white
- Mascots: Ike the Spike & Nook Monster
- Ballpark: Medlar Field at Lubrano Park (2006–present)
- Previous parks: Skylands Park (1994–2005); East Field (1993); Bernie Arbour Memorial Stadium (1988–1992); Ainsworth Field (1981–1987); Falcon Park (1958–1980)
- Owner/ Operator: State College Professional Baseball LP
- General manager: Scott Walker
- Manager: Dave Trembley
- Website: mlbdraftleague.com/state-college

The State College Spikes are a collegiate summer baseball team of the MLB Draft League. They are located in State College, Pennsylvania, and play their home games at Medlar Field on the campus of Pennsylvania State University.

The team was founded in 1958 in Auburn, New York, as an affiliate of the New York Yankees. Through its first two decades, the team's affiliation passed through the New York Mets, Minnesota Twins, and Philadelphia Phillies. In 1978, however, the team was left without a Major League Baseball (MLB) parent club. Auburn fielded independent teams in the New York–Penn League—with new nicknames each year—until 1980. Erie-area businessmen Dave Masi and Joe Castelli propped up the franchise for the 1980 season, then moved it to Erie, as the Erie Cardinals, reflecting the new affiliation with the St. Louis Cardinals. That affiliation lasted for 25 years, with three further relocations—to Hamilton, Ontario as the Hamilton Redbirds, Glens Falls, New York as the Glens Falls Redbirds and to Augusta, New Jersey as the New Jersey Cardinals.

The team settled in its current location in the State College area in 2006 and became known as the State College Spikes. After one season with the St. Louis Cardinals in State College, the Spikes ended their affiliation and became the new Class A Short Season affiliate of the Pittsburgh Pirates, starting in 2007 and ending in 2012. The Spikes, once again, switched affiliations back to the Cardinals from 2013 to 2020. In conjunction with MLB's reorganization of the minors after the 2020 season, the team left Minor League Baseball and became part of the MLB Draft League, which serves as a showcase for draft-eligible players.

== History ==
=== Stability, then instability in Auburn (1958–1980) ===
The State College Spikes were founded in 1958 in Auburn, New York, as the Auburn Yankees. The team played its home games at Falcon Park in Auburn from 1958 to 1980. For two decades, affiliated baseball was a mainstay in Auburn. After the Yankees, the Mets, Twins and Phillies all had affiliation agreements with the team. In 1978, however, the team did not have an agreement in place. Auburn fielded an independent team known as the Auburn Sunsets. Unaffiliated baseball remained in Auburn for the following two seasons, as well. The team changed its name to the Auburn Red Stars in 1979 and Auburn Americans in 1980. Erie-area businessmen Dave Masi and Joe Castelli propped up the Americans, then reached an affiliation agreement with the St. Louis Cardinals during baseball's winter meetings. They moved the team to Erie for the 1981 season.

=== Playing in Erie (1981–1987) ===
The new Erie Cardinals played their home games at Ainsworth Field from 1981 to 1987. The team relocated to Hamilton, Ontario after the 1987 season and were replaced by the relocation of the Newark Orioles to Erie to become the Erie Orioles (now Hudson Valley Renegades) who played in the same league for the 1988 season.

=== Playing in Hamilton (1988–1992) ===
The team was purchased by Albany businessman Joe Vellano and the team relocated to Bernie Arbour Memorial Stadium in Hamilton, Ontario, to become the Hamilton Redbirds. The team maintained its affiliation with the Cardinals and played in Hamilton from 1988 to 1992. In 1991, Vellano sold the Redbirds to a limited partnership headed by Barry Gordon and Marc Klee. Gordon and Klee planned to relocate the team to New Jersey where partner Rob Hillard was heading up management of a new stadium. The team spent a lame duck 1991 season in Hamilton, but in 1992, the team set the all-time record for winning percentage by a St. Louis Cardinals minor league team at .651, with a record of 56–20.

=== Playing in Glens Falls (1993) ===
The team relocated again to Glens Falls, New York, to become the Glens Falls Redbirds. The team still maintained its affiliation with the Cardinals. This relocation was only interim as the team played at East Field for the 1993 season only while the team was waiting for their new stadium in Sussex County, New Jersey to be completed.

The team's relocation to Glens Falls welcomed back professional baseball in five years. The team that previously played in Glens Falls before the Redbirds was the Eastern League's Glens Falls Tigers which relocated to London, Ontario and are now based in Trenton, New Jersey as the Trenton Thunder. Former owner Jack Tracz managed the interim operation and the manager for the 1993 season was Steve Turco after a season in which they had. Despite only agreeing to play in Glens Falls for one season, the team led the league in attendance with 78,725 and the team went 37–40, third in the 4-team McNamara Division, but just 4 games behind the Pittsfield Mets.

=== Playing in New Jersey (1994–2005) ===
The team completed its relocation to Augusta, New Jersey, which is located in Sussex County to become the New Jersey Cardinals despite having construction delays on the stadium and the apparent mismanagement by the stadium group which filed for Chapter 11 bankruptcy 120 days before the start of the season. The team still maintained its affiliation with the Cardinals. The new stadium opened on schedule in large part due to the ownership and management of the Cardinals which was headed by Gordon and Klee's general manager Tony Torre. The team played their home games at Skylands Park from 1994 to 2005. The team put together a 43–32 regular-season mark, and then defeated the Jamestown Jammers, 2 games to 1, and the Auburn Astros, 2 games to 0, to win the league title.

Over the next nine seasons, the team experienced only one more winning season, going 39–37 in 2002. While the team suffered through several losing seasons, they quietly established new standards for Minor League Baseball attendance. With the arrival of additional teams in the New York metropolitan area and further stadium mismanagement attendance, began to slip. The Cardinals drew a league-leading 142,417 fans in their inaugural season, following that up with 157,557 in 1995, but 115,342 in 2004. The team relocated again after the 2005 season and were replaced by Sussex Skyhawks of the independent Canadian-American Association of Professional Baseball. This team folded after the 2010 season, leaving Skylands Park vacant for the first time in the stadium's history.

=== Playing in State College (2006–present) ===
In October 2005, the owners agreed to sell the New Jersey Cardinals to a group headed by the principal partners of the Class Double-A Altoona Curve of the Eastern League. This allowed for a professional team to share Medlar Field at Lubrano Park with the host Penn State Nittany Lions baseball team, on whose campus the park stands. After the sale of the team was complete, the New Jersey Cardinals were then relocated to State College to become the State College Spikes. The team's new logo was then unveiled as a young white-tailed deer. The team's new colors became Penn State navy blue, cardinal, old gold, and moonlight yellow. The team still maintained their affiliation with the Cardinals in its first season in State College, but on September 21, 2006, the Spikes ended their affiliation with the Cardinals and became the new Class A-Short Season affiliate of the Pittsburgh Pirates, starting in 2007.. In September 2012, the Spikes switched their affiliation from the Pirates back to the Cardinals.

== Affiliation split with Pittsburgh ==
"We're not one of these ownership groups that demands a winner every single year, but we haven't even put playoff tickets on sale," Spikes general manager Jason Dambach said in June 2012. "We've never really even come close to the playoffs. "So the mandate has been put out there. We didn't have a good team last year, and so it really doesn't make any sense to re-sign with the Pirates until September, if we are to do that." "We weren't mad about J.D.'s comments," Pirates president Frank Coonelly said. State College executives say some phone calls, texts and emails were never returned. Greenberg said the affiliation decision from the Spikes' standpoint had "zero" to do with winning and losing. In September 2012, the Pirates offered State College a player development contract extension. Spikes owner Chuck Greenberg and Coonelly appeared to reach an agreement. However, Greenberg never received a return phone call from anyone with the Pirates—not owner Bob Nutting, nor Coonelly, nor GM Neal Huntington. Huntington said that "relationship endings are not always pretty," and this one appears to fall somewhere in that category.

== Team name ==
The team name "Spikes" has a threefold meaning. The club's official logo depicts a young white-tailed deer, for whom a "spike" is an undeveloped antler, symbolic of a young team member who may develop into a Major League Baseball player. The name also refers to a railroad spike, similar to the way the name "Altoona Curve" commemorates the famous Horseshoe Curve on the Pennsylvania Railroad. Finally, baseball players have long worn shoes with spikes. The team's official colors are Penn State navy blue, cardinal red, old gold, and moonlight yellow.

== Season-by-season records ==
(Place listed is finish in the six-team Pinckney Division, 2006–2019)

- 2006: 39–36 (3rd), manager Mark DeJohn
- 2007: 36–39 (3rd), manager Turner Ward
- 2008: 18–56 (6th), manager Brad Fischer
- 2009: 38–38 (3rd), manager Gary Robinson
- 2010: 33–42 (5th), manager Dave Turgeon
- 2011: 31–44 (n/a), manager Kimera Bartee
- 2012: 35–41 (n/a), manager Dave Turgeon
- 2013: 48–27(1st), manager Oliver Marmol
- 2014: 48–28(1st), manager Oliver Marmol
- 2015: 41–35(3rd), manager Johnny Rodriguez
- 2017: 40–35 (2nd)
- 2018: 36–40 (4th)
- 2019: 39–36 (3rd), manager Jose Leon
- 2021: 29–30–3 (4th), manager Delwyn Young

== Playoffs ==
- 2013 season: Defeated Jamestown 2–1 in semifinals; lost to Tri-City 2–1 in championship.
- 2014 season: Defeated Hudson Valley 2–1 in semifinals; defeated Tri-City 2–1 to win championship.
- 2016 season: Defeated Staten Island 2–1 in semifinals; defeated Hudson Valley 2–0 to win championship.

== Roster ==
State College Spikes roster
Players		Coaches/Other
Pitchers: -- Colton Book; 3 Jonah Conradt; 20 Brett Dunham; 37 Wyatt Evans; 7 Brayden Heidel; 19 Carter Holjes; 28 Luke House; 12 Roman Kimball; 33 Aidan Lee; 50 Landon O'Donnell; 11 Bobby Olsen; 39 Dayne Pengelly; 35 Treyson Peters; 55 Jason Shockley; 13 Ethan Storm; 27 Davis Webb; 38 Caden Wooster	Catchers: 25 Dylan LaPointe; 16 Hugh Pinkney; 31 Camden Ross; Infielders: 8 Quinn Bentley; 23 Merik Carter; 4 Matt Evans; 22 Javon Hernandez; 34 Landen Johnson; 2 Carmello Musacchia; 15 Ryan Rivera; Outfielders: 29 Harrison Didawick; 5 Cole Pladson; 41 Caden Shapiro; 43 Dan Tauken	Manager: 23 Tim Battle; Coaches: 44 Lastings Milledge (hitting); 48 Jared Brown (pitching); 7-day injured list; ~ Development list; # Rehab assignment; ∞ Reserve list; ‡ Restricted list; § Suspended list; † Temporarily inactive list; Roster updated June 25, 2025; Transactions; → More rosters: MiLB • MLB Draft League
