= UPMC Park =

Baseball park in Erie, Pennsylvania

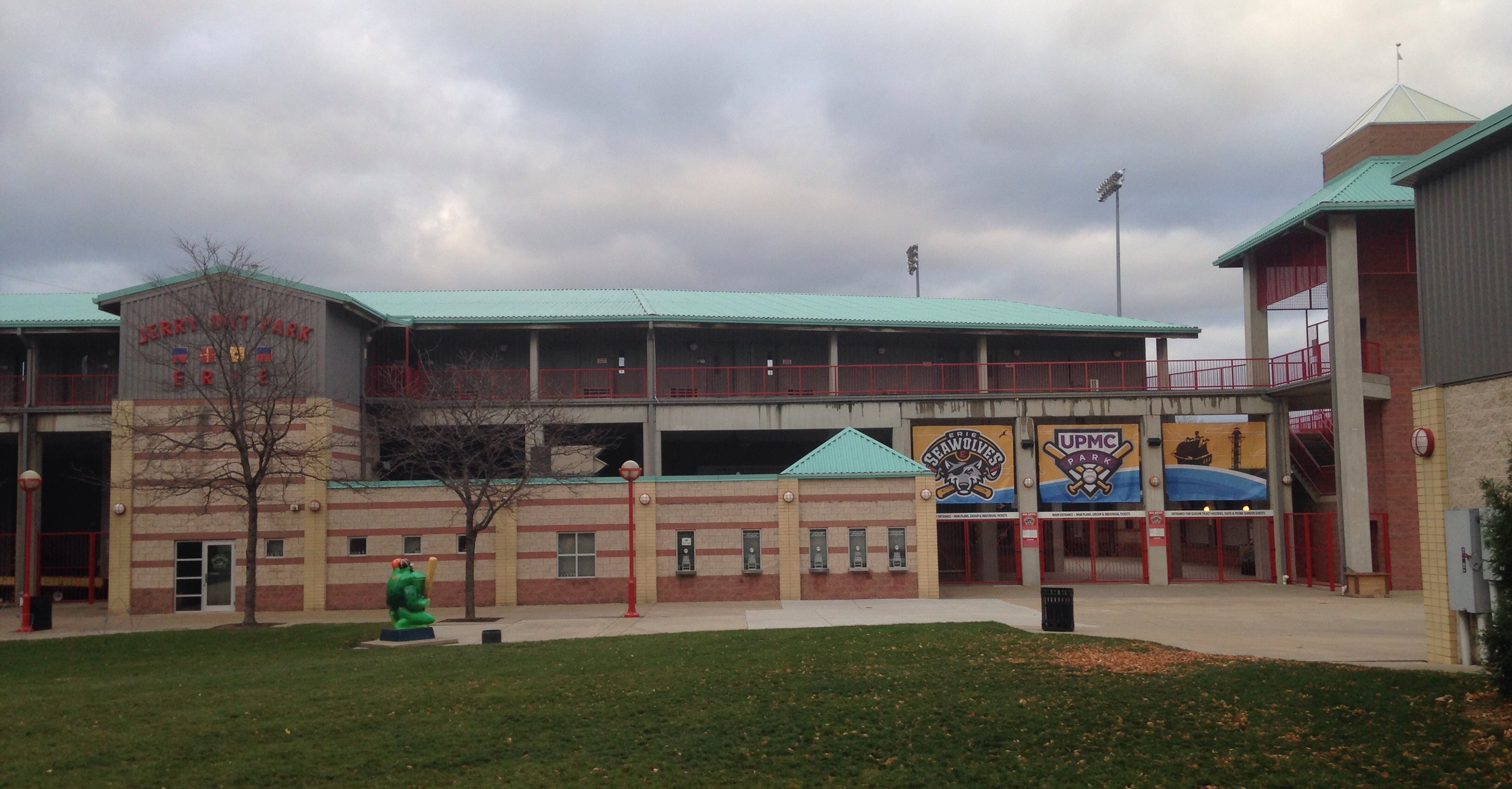

- Location within Pennsylvania Location within the United States
- Interactive map of UPMC Park
- Former names: Jerry Uht Park (1995–2016)
- Address: 110 East 10th Street; Erie, Pennsylvania
- Coordinates: 42°7′37″N 80°4′48″W
- Owner: City of Erie
- Operator: Erie County Convention Center Authority
- Capacity: 6,000
- Field size: Left Field: 316 feet (96 m); Center Field: 400 feet (120 m); Right Field: 328 feet (100 m)

Construction
- Groundbreaking: July 27, 1994
- Opened: June 20, 1995
- Cost: $9 million ($19 million in 2025 dollars)
- Architects: Lescher Mahoney Sports; Weber Murphy Fox
- Project manager: Heery International
- Structural engineers: MC Engineers, Inc.

Tenant
- Erie SeaWolves (EL) (1995–present)

UPMC Park, originally named Jerry Uht Park, sits in Erie, Pennsylvania and hosts the Double-A Erie SeaWolves of the Eastern League, the city's Minor League Baseball (MiLB) team. As an affiliate of the Detroit Tigers Major League Baseball club, the SeaWolves have played at the stadium since its first regular season game on June 20, 1995, when major league veteran José Guillén hit a home run to secure a SeaWolves victory over the Jamestown Jammers.

The park replaced Ainsworth Field, built in 1947, and features a natural grass and dirt playing field. It is part of the Erie Civic Center Complex, which also includes Erie Insurance Arena and the Warner Theatre, all governed by the Erie County Convention Center Authority. The stadium has a seating capacity of 6,000. After the 2016 season, the SeaWolves partnered with the University of Pittsburgh Medical Center (UPMC) in a naming-rights agreement to rebrand the stadium as "UPMC Park." In April 2022, the two organizations extended the agreement through 2030. Although the parties did not disclose the financial terms, they have invested more than $20 million in stadium upgrades since the original deal, including new scoreboards, clubhouse renovations, and expanded fan amenities.

In 2008, the ESPN sports broadcast company ranked the ballpark number five out of ten minor league ballparks in seating arrangements. They especially noted its unique mezzanine level, which overlooks the infield along the first base side. In July 2015, the People for the Ethical Treatment of Animals (PETA) also ranked the stadium number five among the most vegetarian-friendly minor league ballparks.

== History ==
Before UPMC Park's construction, the Erie SeaWolves (then known as the Welland Pirates) played at Welland Stadium in Welland, Ontario. They moved to Erie after owner Marvin Goldklang relocated the Erie Sailors to Wappingers Falls, New York (where they became the Hudson Valley Renegades) because he did not want to upgrade Ainsworth Field to the standards Major League Baseball required of its affiliated clubs. Once the civic government secured an $8 million grant from the Commonwealth of Pennsylvania to build UPMC Park, the Welland Pirates moved to Erie. The remaining $1 million for architectural expenses were covered by the City of Erie, Erie County, and the 300-member Team Erie, each of whom contributed $300,000. Additionally, nearby Millcreek Township contributed $25,000. The ballpark site was originally home to a Sears building turned Exhibit Hall. Crews broke ground on July 27, 1994, and completed Jerry Uht Park in May 1995.

On July 10, 2015, Jerry Uht Park hosted Global Force Wrestling's Grand Slam Tour, its first major professional wrestling event.

=== Original namesake ===
Gerard T. "Jerry" Uht Sr. was a minor league baseball player and longtime Erie resident. In 1995, he established a US$500,000 endowment with PNC Bank and the Erie Community Foundation to fund ongoing support for the downtown baseball stadium. The city honored his generosity by naming the stadium Jerry Uht Park. As of January 2007, the Erie Community Foundation continued to manage the endowment, which had grown to US$750,000. According to the Erie Times-News, officials designated the fund specifically for stadium maintenance expenses and equipment purchases. The name remained in use until a naming rights agreement with the University of Pittsburgh Medical Center (UPMC) following the 2016 season rebranded the stadium as "UPMC Park."

=== John Oliver rebranding (2025) ===
In May 2025, Last Week Tonight with John Oliver aired a segment inviting Minor League Baseball teams to apply for a full rebranding. The show selected the Erie SeaWolves from 47 applicants for the promotion.

The SeaWolves temporarily rebranded as the "Erie Moon Mammoths" for their home game on June 30, 2025. The promotion introduced a new logo, uniforms, and a custom mascot named, Fuzz E. Mammoth. Team merchandise, including jerseys and novelty items, featured space-themed imagery and sold out quickly.

The June 30 game drew a record-breaking crowd to UPMC Park, with more than 6,800 fans in attendance. Oliver also contributed promotional videos, in-stadium signage, and humorous commentary on the temporary identity. Local officials praised the initiative for spotlighting Erie on a national stage, and fans widely embraced the Moon Mammoths brand.

== Features ==
Seating along UPMC Park's first and third baselines has a unique configuration due to the space constraints of urban construction. There are three main concession stands, a picnic area for fans, and six luxury suites for special occasions. The ballpark is known for its two distinctive grandstands, each with its own design.

In 2006, the park underwent a $4 million renovation. Additions included a new 40-foot (12 m) electronic scoreboard (which has a nautical theme), a two-tiered picnic area, eleven luxury box seats, and new concession stands. Crews installed an additional video board on Erie Insurance Arena, which borders the stadium. The board displays scores from other Eastern League games, player statistics, and updates about the Detroit Tigers. UPMC Park's batting zone mirrors that of Comerica Park in Detroit, exaggerating the contour of the regulation home plate.

In spring 2012, construction crews built a new 33-foot (10 m) wall along UPMC Park's border with Erie Insurance Arena. The Erie Times-News dubbed it the "Gray Monster," referencing Fenway Park’s Green Monster in Boston. Despite the wall's height, they kept the home-run marker at 17-foot (5.2 m). This upgrade formed part of the $42 million renovation of Erie Insurance Arena, located just 312-foot (95 m) from the left-field boundary. Workers also moved the left-field foul pole from 312-foot (95 m) to 316-foot (96 m), and relocated the batting cages from left field to right-center, near the scoreboard.

On August 13, 2018, Pennsylvania Governor Tom Wolf announced that UPMC Park would receive $12 million in funding through the Redevelopment Capital Assistance Program. The upgrades aim to include enhanced video boards, renovated suites, improved concession and restroom areas, and a new left-field stadium entrance featuring a climate-controlled team store and stadium club.

== Gallery ==
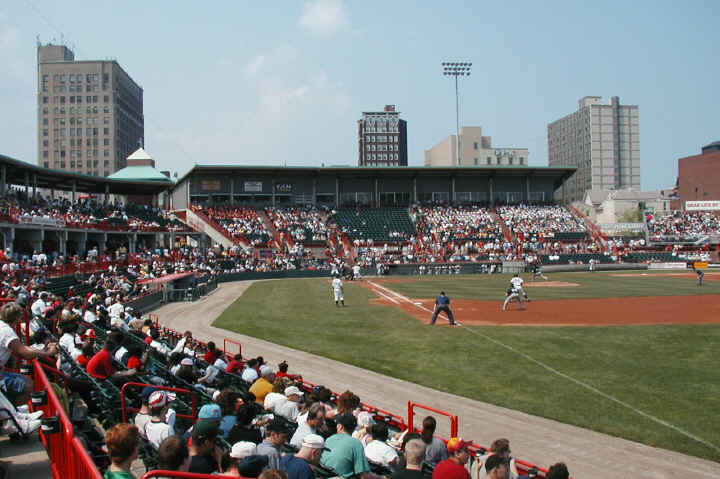
Outfield of UPMC Park, 2007

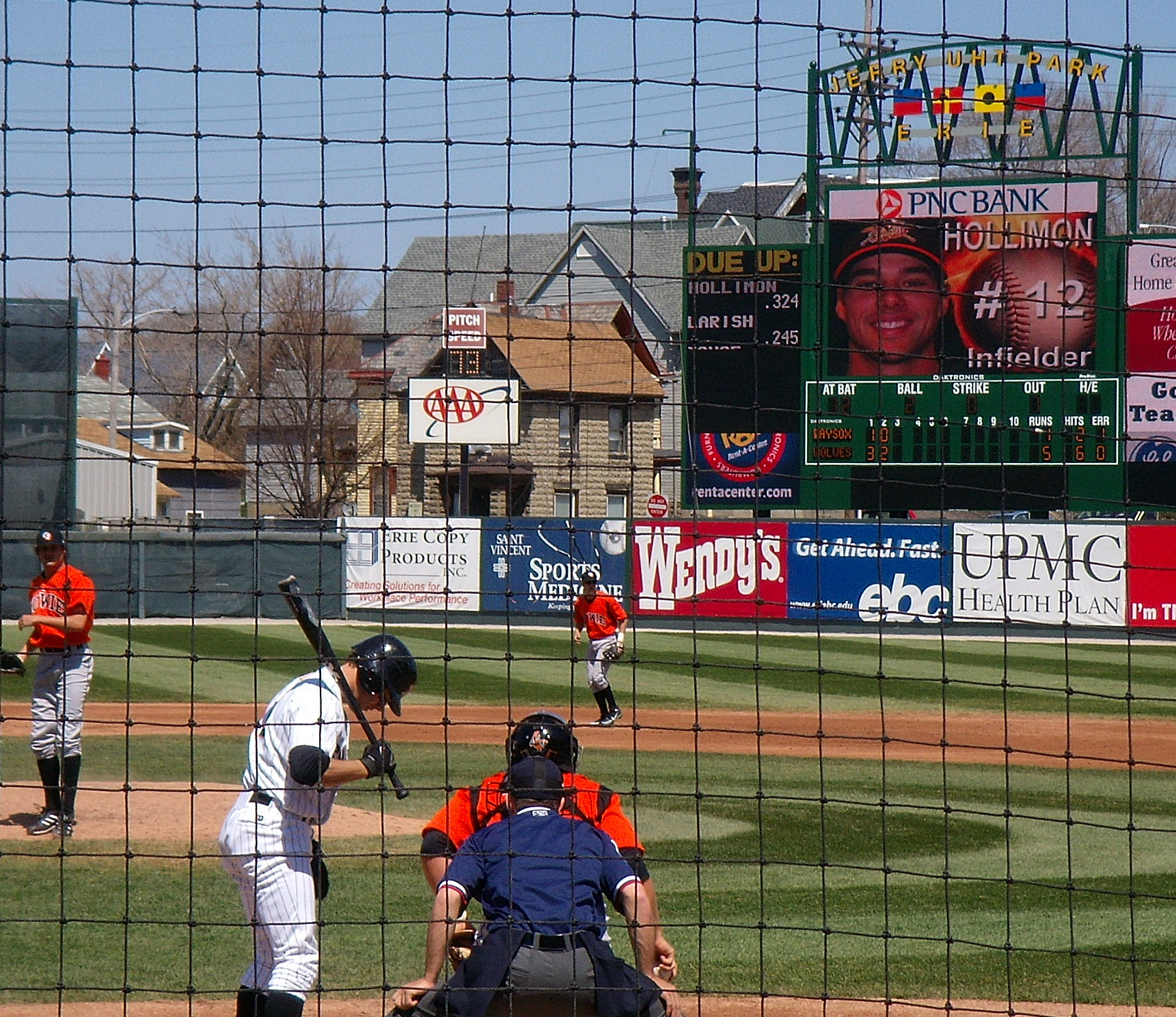
Infield of UPMC Park, 2007

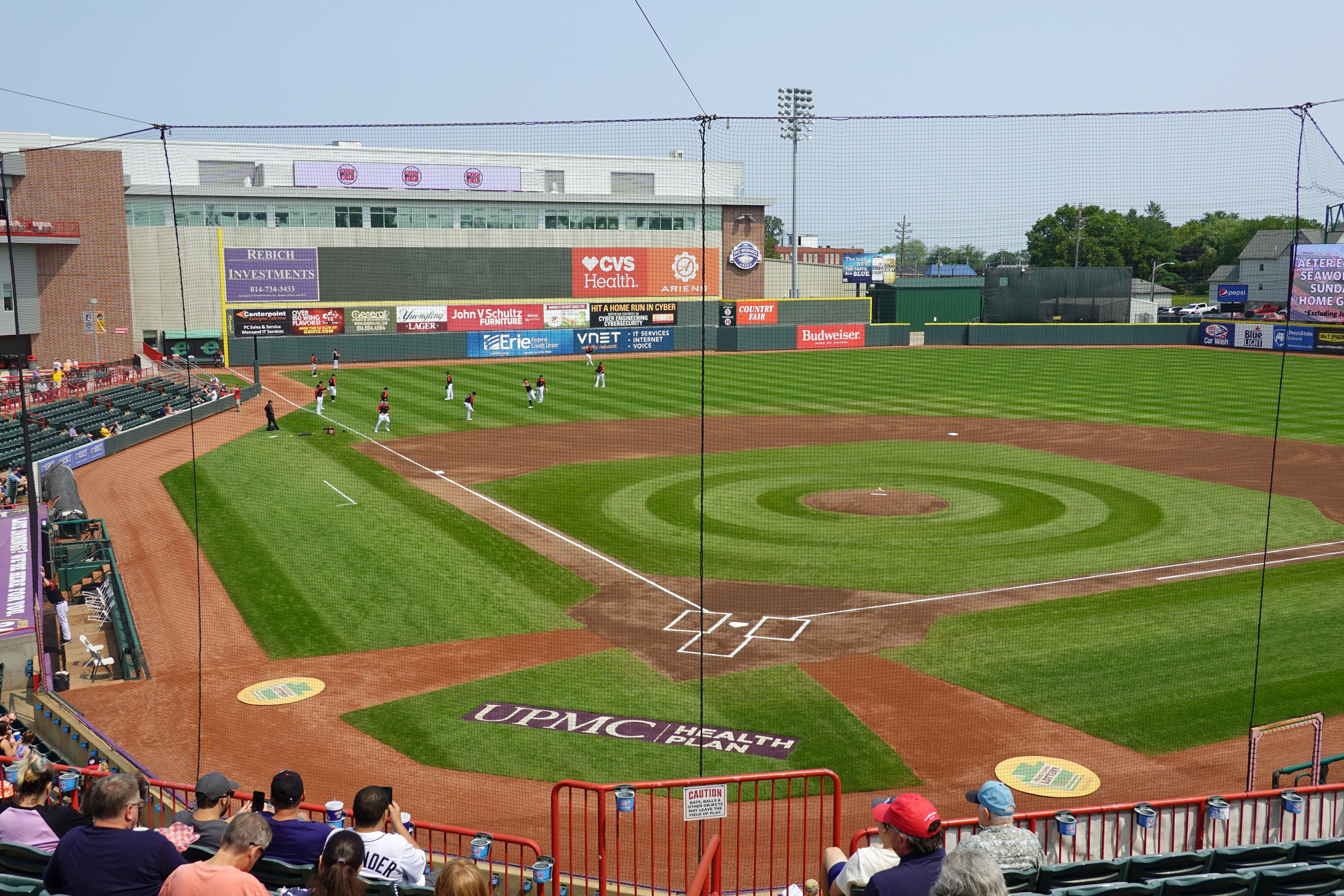
UPMC Park Upper Level, Erie, PA July 18, 2021

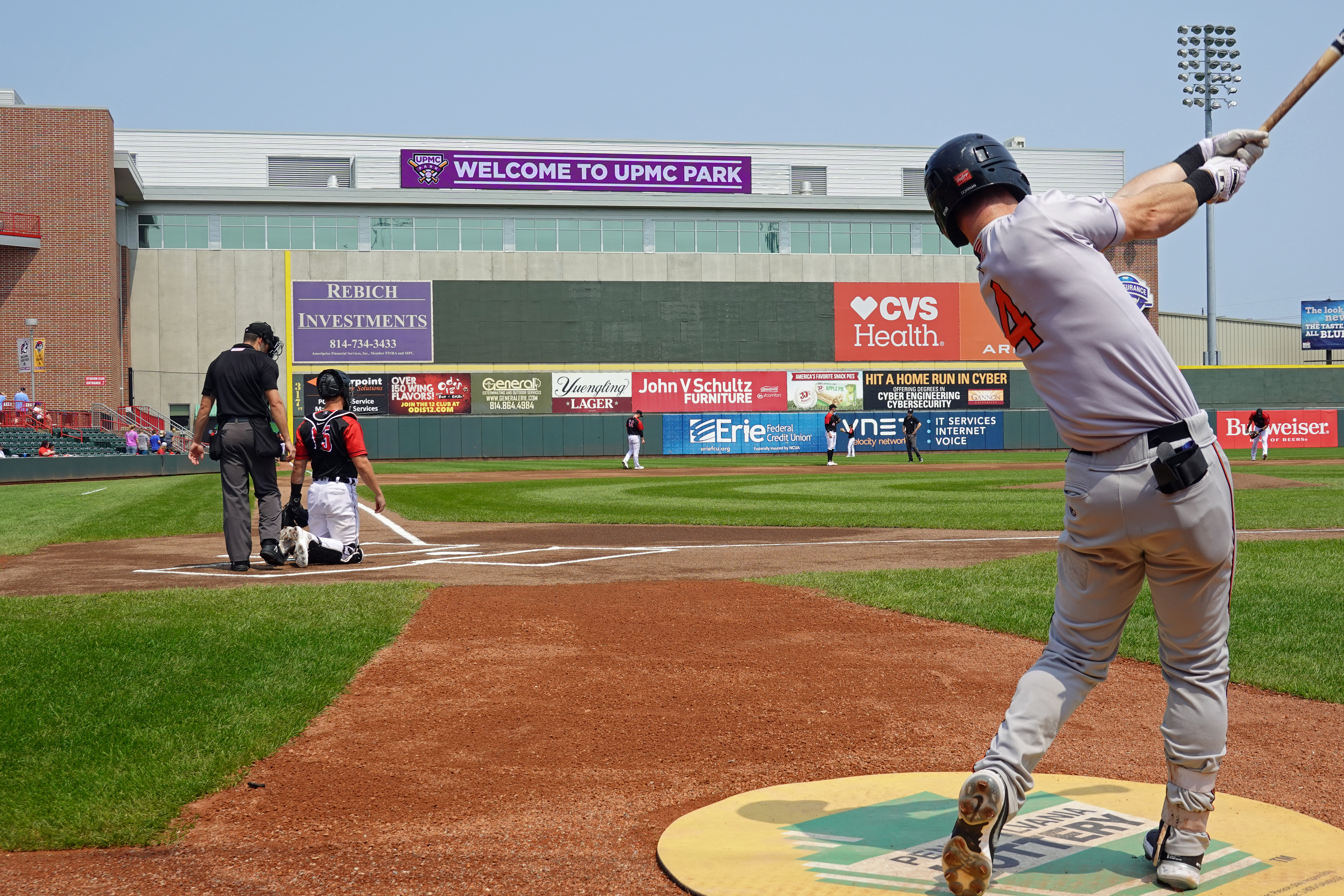
UPMC Park Home Plate, Erie, PA July 18, 2021

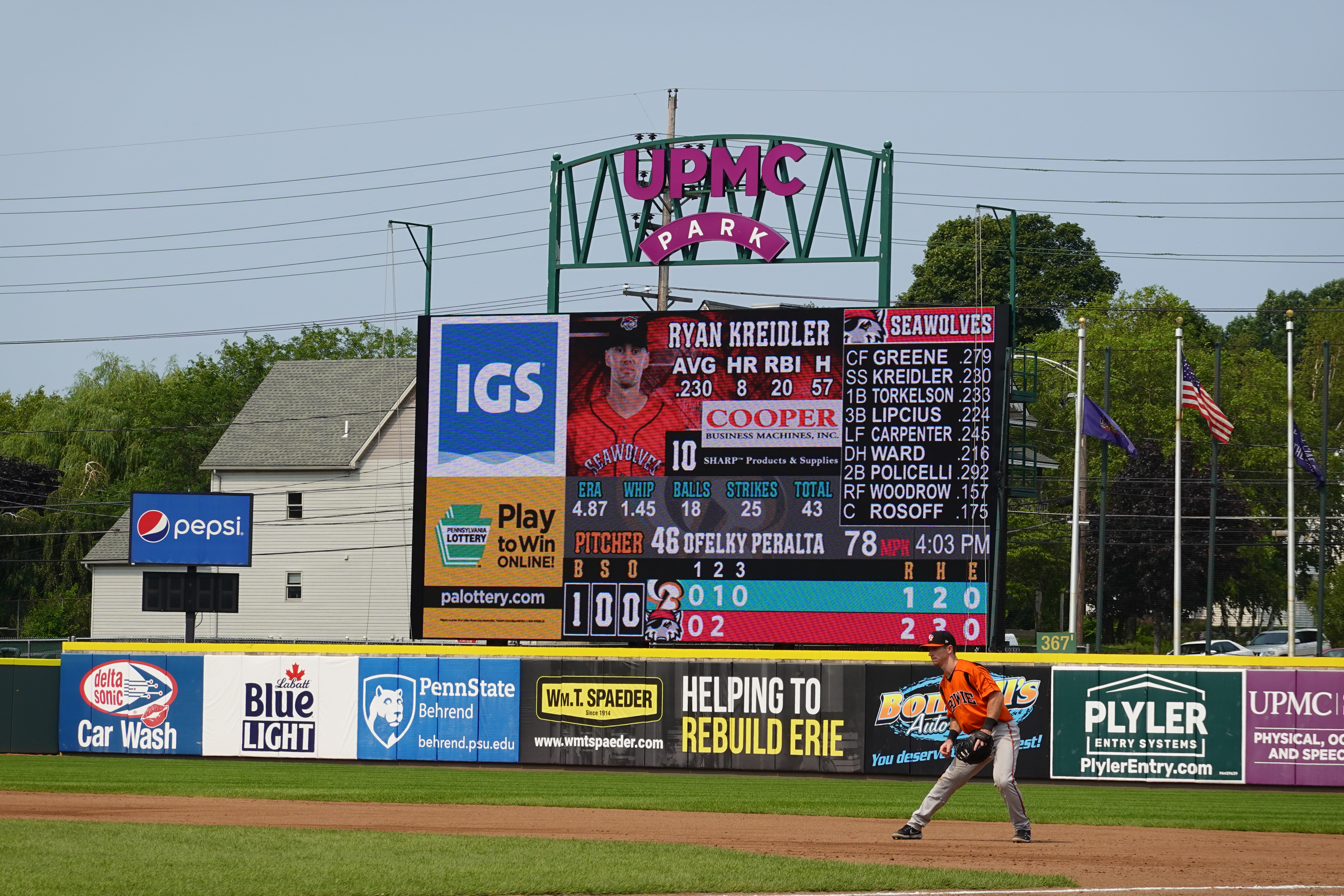
UPMC Park Scoreboard, Erie, PA July 18, 2021

== Concessions ==
Happy Howler LLC has managed food and beverage services at UPMC Park since 2019, providing classic ballpark items like hot dogs, hamburgers, nachos, and peanuts. Fans can also enjoy regional specialties, such as Erie-made pepperoni balls, ox roast sandwiches, cheesesteaks, and Yuengling beer.

In July 2017, UPMC Park debuted the Mojo & AC Rocket Dog—a hot dog topped with pulled pork, mac & cheese, bacon, and BBQ sauce—which won first place in Minor League Baseball's Bush's Home Run Recipes Contest.
