= Bears & Eagles Riverfront Stadium =

Former baseball stadium in Newark, New Jersey, United States

Coordinates: 40°44′45″N 74°10′6″W

- Brick City; The Den
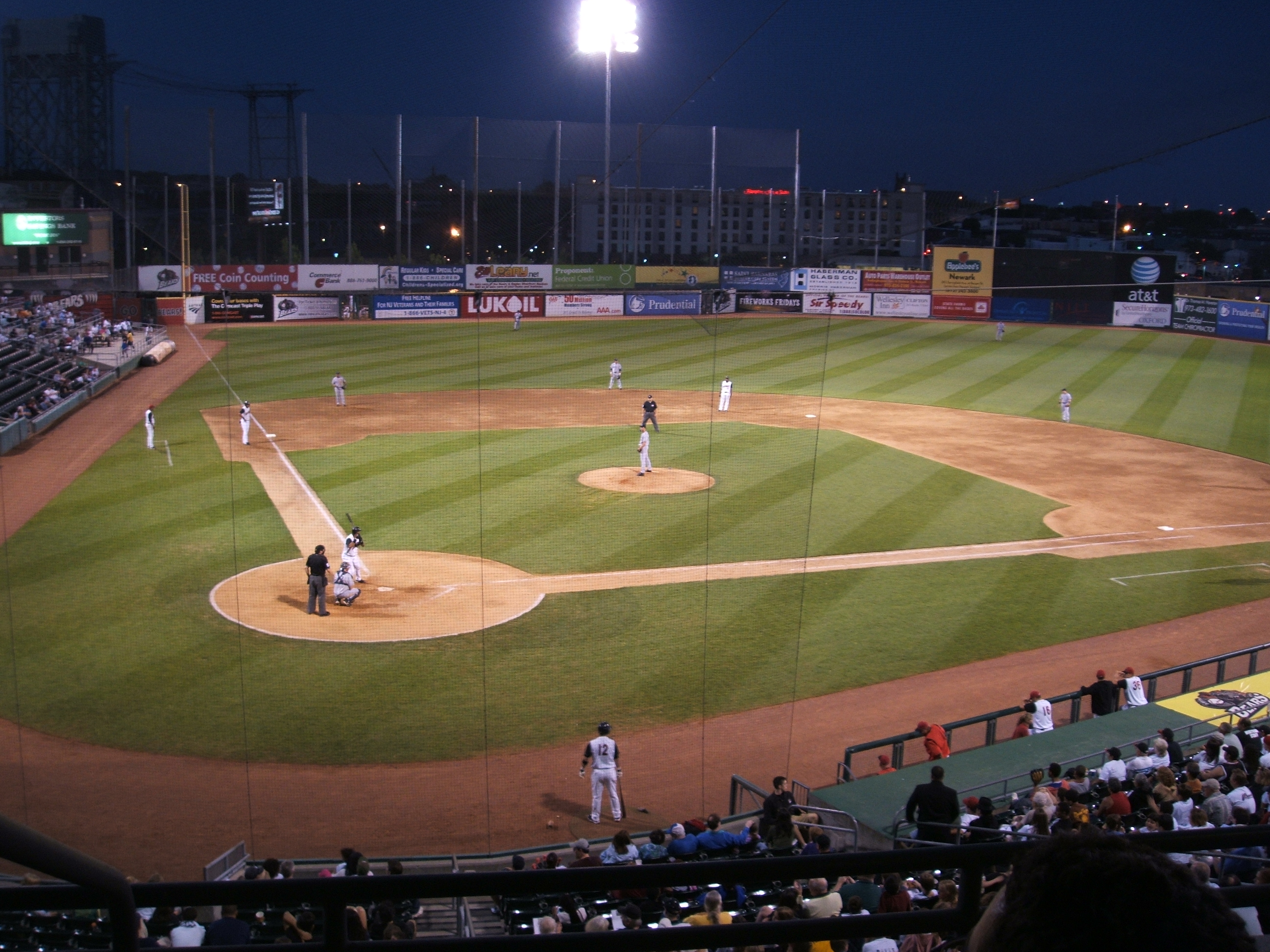
- Interactive map of Bears & Eagles Riverfront Stadium
- Location: 450 Broad Street; Newark, New Jersey, U.S.
- Capacity: 6,200
- Surface: Grass
- Field size: Left field: 302 feet (92 m); Left-center field: 364 feet (111 m); Center field: 394 feet (120 m); Right-center field: 365 feet (111 m); Right field: 320 feet (98 m)
- Public transit: Newark Light Rail at Riverfront Stadium and Newark Broad Street; NJ Transit Bus: 11, 13, 27, 28, go28, 29, 30, 41, 76, 378

Construction
- Opened: July 16, 1999
- Demolished: August 2019
- Cost: US$30 million
- Architect: Populous

Tenants
- Newark Bears (Atlantic/Can-Am) (1999–2013); Rutgers–Newark Scarlet Raiders baseball (NCAA); NJIT Highlanders baseball (NCAA)

Bears & Eagles Riverfront Stadium, originally simply Riverfront Stadium, was a 6,200-seat baseball park in Newark, New Jersey built in 1999. It was the home field of the Newark Bears, who played in the Atlantic League of Professional Baseball, an independent minor baseball league. The Bears played in the stadium from 1999 until 2013 when they announced a move to the Canadian-American Association of Professional Baseball, but the team was folded shortly thereafter.

The stadium was also home to the baseball teams of two of Newark's universities: the Rutgers-Newark Scarlet Raiders, who play in the New Jersey Athletic Conference as part of NCAA Division III, and the NJIT Highlanders, who play in the America East Conference as part of NCAA Division I.

The stadium was named in honor of the original Bears, who were the top farm club of the New York Yankees from 1946 until 1949, and the Newark Eagles, who played in the Negro leagues. Above the press boxes, the stadium featured a Hall of Fame bearing the names of famed players from the Bears and the Eagles and baseball players from Newark.

The stadium cost $34 million to build. It was sold to a developer in 2016 for $23 million, and in the site was designated for a commercial-residential project originally named Riverfront Square and demolished by the city in 2019, but resold and renamed CitiSquare Newark in 2022. Progress on the site was stalled as of mid-2025, but tax breaks to the developer continue due to a loophole, with development experts speculating that the developer was not capable of such a large project.

== History ==
The Newark Bears had joined the Atlantic League at its founding in 1998 but played their 'home' games at The Ballpark at Harbor Yard in Bridgeport, Connecticut during that first season, sharing the park with the Bridgeport Bluefish. Since the construction of the stadium was still not finished in 1999, the Bears played their first 20 home games at Skylands Park in Augusta, New Jersey, sharing the facility with the New Jersey Cardinals. The stadium hosted its first baseball game on July 16, 1999, when the Bears took on the Lehigh Valley Black Diamonds.

The Bears nicknamed the stadium "Brick City" or "The Den".

Originally, the stadium was to be built along the Passaic River, perhaps at or near Riverbank Park, but the eventual site was at Broad and Orange Streets. The block of Orange Street, between Broad Street and McCarter Highway, was vacated to allow for the ballpark to be built.

In 2001, the Bears added "Bears & Eagles" to the name of the park. The new name reflected the heritage represented by both the International League's Bears, and the Negro National League Newark Eagles, both of whom had played at Ruppert Stadium (demolished in 1967) in the area now called the Ironbound.

In 2019, the stadium was demolished to make way for a new development called Riverfront Square. The developers of the project, Lotus, selected Practice for Architecture and Urbanism (PAU), led by Vishaan Chakrabarti, to develop the master plan and oversee part of the architectural design for the project.

== Public transportation ==
The stadium was across the street from New Jersey Transit's Broad Street Station. Opened July 17, 2006, the Riverfront Stadium station on the Newark Light Rail provides service from Newark Penn Station.

== See also ==
- List of NCAA Division I baseball venues
- History of sports in Newark, New Jersey
