= Hamilton Redbirds =

- 1988–1992; Hamilton, Ontario

Minor league affiliations
- Class: Short-Season A (1988–1992)
- League: New York–Penn League (1988–1992)
- Division: Stedler

Major league affiliations
- Team: St. Louis Cardinals (1988–1992)

Minor league titles
- Division titles: 1992

Team data
- Name: Hamilton Redbirds
- Ballpark: Bernie Arbour Memorial Stadium

The Hamilton Redbirds were a minor league baseball team that played in the New York–Penn League from 1988 to 1992. They were affiliated with the St. Louis Cardinals and played their home games at Bernie Arbour Memorial Stadium in Hamilton, Ontario. The Redbirds were founded in 1988, but the franchise itself was founded in 1958 as the Auburn Yankees. It moved to Erie, Pennsylvania, for the 1981 season, beginning its longtime affiliation with the St. Louis Cardinals. The Erie Cardinals played at Ainsworth Field in Erie, Pennsylvania, from 1981 to 1987. The Erie Cardinals then relocated to Hamilton, Ontario, to become the Hamilton Redbirds.

In their five seasons, the Redbirds developed future Major League talent that included NFL Pro Bowl defensive back Brian Jordan, first baseman John Mabry, pitchers Allen Watson and Donovan Osborne. The Redbirds inaugural season also featured a rarity when Auburn Astros centerfielder Kenny Lofton hit into an unassisted triple play to the hands of first baseman Joe Federico. Federico's glove and #24 jersey were secured by the Canadian Baseball Hall of Fame. However, as the result of a reporting error by the official scorer to the Elias Sports Bureau (then league statisticians) the rare feat is not logged in league records.

The Redbirds was a minor league team that featured unique promotions such as Camel Races, The San Diego Chicken, the antics of baseball clown Max Patkin and the national anthem was a recording of Montreal Canadiens famed anthem singer Roger Doucet.

The team faced an unsettled ownership situation, with Jack Tracz, who moved the franchise to Hamilton, selling the team to a group led by Rob Hilliard in 1991. Hilliard attempted to get an expansion team in the Double-A Eastern League, and to expand or improve the stadium. These efforts failed, and in after the 1992 season, the team relocated to East Field in Glens Falls, New York in 1993 to become the Glens Falls Redbirds. Additional moves followed, and the franchise is now the State College Spikes, playing in University Park, Pennsylvania, as a member of the MLB Draft League.

== Year-by-year record ==
| Year | NYPL Division | Record | W% | GB | Manager | Playoffs |
|---|---|---|---|---|---|---|
| 1988 | Stedler | 36-39 | .480 | 10.5 | Dan Radison | DNQ |
| 1989 | Stedler | 32-44 | .421 | 12.0 | Joe Pettini | DNQ |
| 1990 | Stedler | 30-46 | .395 | 13.5 | Luis Melendez | DNQ |
| 1991 | Stedler | 35-42 | .455 | 15.5 | Rick Colbert | DNQ |
| 1992 | Stedler | 56-20 | .737 | - | Chris Maloney | Lost in 1st round |

== See also ==
- Former players
