= Central Tech High School =

Coordinates: 42.1020°N 80.0821°W

Central Career and Technical School
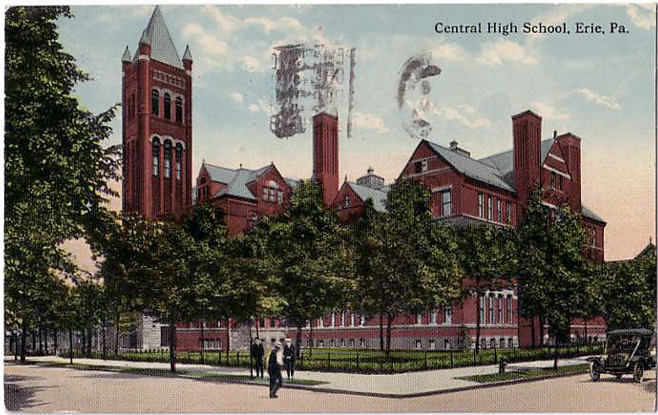
- Postcard, about 1913, of the building that stood at 10th and Sassafras Streets
- Erie, PA; United States

Information
- Former name: Central High School (until 1994)
- Motto: Truth, Loyalty, Honor
- Established: 1957
- Principal: Pam Mackowski
- Grades: 9th-12th
- Enrollment: about 1,200
- Colors: Black and Gold (Yellow)
- Website: http://www.eriecentraltech.org

Central Career & Technical School was a high school in Erie, Pennsylvania, in the United States. Originally named Central High School, it was the result of the merger of Academy High School and Technical Memorial High School after the conclusion of the 1992–1993 academic year when Academy closed. Around 1994, Central was renamed Central Tech.

The attendance was roughly 1,000 students, and offered 21 Career and Technical courses. The school's mascot was a Falcon. It was the Erie School District's regional vocational-technical school before it was renamed Erie High School, after the merger of Strong Vincent High School and East High School in 2017.

In 2017, Central Career & Technical School was renamed Erie High School when the School District of the City of Erie consolidated all of its high schools—with the exception of Northwest Pennsylvania Collegiate Academy. The original Academy High School closed in 1992, when the Erie School District merged it with what was then Technical Memorial High School, which was renamed Central High School in 1992. Central was renamed Central Career & Technical School in 2012.

== Earlier history ==
When occupancy of newly built Academy High School was delayed in the fall of 1919, those students shared facilities with Central through June 1920.

== Soccer team ==
The Central Tech soccer team, is an association football team. The Class of 2014 is the school's most successful, having won a share of the Region AAA title in District 10, during the 2013 season.

== Notable alumni ==
- Fred Biletnikoff, former NFL wide receiver who is in the Pro Football Hall of Fame. The Fred Biletnikoff Award is given out yearly to college's best wide receiver.
