= Newark Bears =

Former independent league baseball team

- 1998–2013; Newark, New Jersey

Minor league affiliations
- Class: Independent (1998–2013)
- League: Atlantic League (1998–2010); Can-Am League (2011–2013)

Minor league titles
- League titles (2): 2002; 2007
- Division titles (1): 2001
- First-half titles (1): 2007

Team data
- Name: Newark Bears (1998–2013)
- Colors: Navy, white, light blue, black, gray
- Ballpark: Bears & Eagles Riverfront Stadium (July 1999–2013); Skylands Park (first half of 1999); The Ballpark at Harbor Yard (1998)

The Newark Bears were an American independent league professional baseball team based in Newark, New Jersey. They were a member of the Atlantic League of Professional Baseball and, later, the Canadian American Association of Professional Baseball. The Bears played their home games at Bears & Eagles Riverfront Stadium. The team folded after the 2013 season.

== History of Newark baseball ==
Newark was the home of several former minor league baseball teams, from the formation of the Newark Indians in 1902 and the addition of the Newark Eagles of the Negro National League in 1936. A Federal League team, the Newark Peppers, also played in 1915.

The original Newark Bears were a team in the International League from 1926 to 1949. They played their home games at the former Ruppert Stadium in what is now known as the Ironbound section of Newark.

=== The Bears of the Atlantic League ===
The Newark Bears are named for the former Newark Bears team of the International League. The new team was formed in 1998 by former New York Yankees catcher Rick Cerone, a Newark native. However, the Bears played their "home" schedule at The Ballpark at Harbor Yard in Bridgeport, Connecticut that season while awaiting the completion of their new home field. In addition, the Bears played several home games during the first half of the 1999 season at Skylands Park in Augusta. The Bears inaugurated their new park, Bears & Eagles Riverfront Stadium, in Newark on July 16, 1999.

Over the years, the Bears attracted star talent to their club. Ozzie Canseco played for the Bears in 2000 and 2001, and his brother José Canseco was with the team for part of 2001 as well. Rickey Henderson played the first half of the 2003 season with the Bears and was named Most Valuable Player in the Atlantic League All-Star Game. He was subsequently signed by the Los Angeles Dodgers but was released at season's end, and he returned to the Bears for 2004. Also in 2003, José Lima pitched for the Bears at the beginning of the season; after the Kansas City Royals signed him away from Newark, Lima won his first seven decisions for the Royals.

Other notable alumni included Edgardo Alfonzo, Billy Ashley, Armando Benítez, Wes Chamberlain, Carl Everett, Keith Foulke, Jay Gibbons, Brian Giles, Pete Incaviglia, Lance Johnson, Jacque Jones, Jim Leyritz, Ramiro Mendoza, Hensley Meulens, Jamie Navarro, Alonzo Powell, Scott Spiezio, Daryle Ward, Scott Williamson and Craig Worthington.

=== Rescue from bankruptcy and possible demise ===
The Newark Bears, under former owner Marc Berson, filed Chapter 11 bankruptcy on October 24, 2008. The team's existence was almost compromised until the Bases Loaded Group, LLC purchased the team, guaranteeing a $1 million line of credit to the Atlantic League. The Bases Loaded Group consisted of executives from Philadelphia and New Jersey, some hailing from Newark. The primary leader of the group was Tom Cetnar, former General Manager of the Bears in 2001. He served as president and was a member of the ownership group.

=== Move to the Can-Am League ===
The Newark Bears joined the Canadian American Association of Professional Baseball on October 6, 2010. The Bears were one of three teams to join the league for the 2011 season, with the traveling New York Federals and the expansion Rockland Boulders. Newark was originally to be one of three cities to represent New Jersey in the Can-Am League along with Little Falls, home of the New Jersey Jackals, and Augusta, home of the Sussex Skyhawks. The Skyhawks, however, elected to stop operating after the 2010 season.

In 2010, the Newark Bears were purchased by New Jersey radiologist Dr. Douglas Spiel and his partner, Danielle Dronet.

The Can-Am League announced on November 28, 2013, the Newark Bears would not operate in 2014, with the remaining four teams now a division in the American Association. An auction for the team's assets was held on April 26, 2014.

== Logos and uniforms ==
The Bears' original primary logo, used from 1998 to 2004

The Bears' primary logo used from 2005-2008

The Newark Bears went through three phases of logos and uniform colors. When the franchise began, it had a purple, black and white color scheme. In the mid-2000s, the team went to red, black, and white. When the club ceased operations, its colors were navy blue and white. The primary logo consisted of a stylized bear holding a baseball bat superimposed over a depiction of the Newark skyline over a baseball diamond. The "Newark Bears" wordmark was centered at the base of the logo and included white accents and a black outline.

The Bears' uniforms were traditional in design. The home cap was navy blue throughout with a white block "N" centered on the front. The home jerseys were white with traditional navy blue pinstripes. A navy blue, block "N" was prominently displayed on the left breast. The road jersey was gray with the cursive "Newark" wordmark in navy blue, centered diagonally across the front. Both home and away jersey sleeves sported the Bears' primary logo. The Bears wore navy blue belts and socks with all uniforms.

== Season-by-season records ==
Newark Bears - 2004 to 2011
Season	W - L record	Winning percentage	Finish	Result	Manager
1998	35-65	.350	6th	Did not qualify for playoffs	Tom O'Malley
1999	55-64	.462	5th in 1st half, 3rd in 2nd half	Did not qualify for playoffs	Tom O'Malley
2000	74-66	.529	4th in North Division	Did not qualify for playoffs	Tom O'Malley
2001	75-51	.595	1st in South Division	Lost to Somerset in Championship Series	Tom O'Malley
2002	69-55	.566	2nd in South Division	Atlantic League Champions, defeated Bridgeport in Championship Series	Marv Foley
2003	63-63	.500	2nd in South Division	Did not qualify for playoffs	Bill Madlock
2004	63-63	.500	2nd in South Division	Did not qualify for playoffs	Bill Madlock
2005	58-82	.414	3rd in North Division	Did not qualify for playoffs	Chris Jones
2006	42-83	.336	3rd in North Division	Did not qualify for playoffs	Chris Jones
2007	72-54	.571	2nd in North Division	2-0 (won championship)	Wayne Krenchicki
2008	72-68	.514	Last in Freedom Division	Did not qualify for playoffs	Wayne Krenchicki
2009	74-66	.529	2nd in Freedom Division	1-3 (lost to Somerset in Freedom Division Championship)	Tim Raines
2010	53-86	.381	4th in Freedom Division	Did not qualify for playoffs	Tim Raines
2011	41-51	.446	6th in Canadian-American Association	Did not qualify for playoffs	Tim Raines
2012	35-65	.350	4th in Canadian-American Association	Did not qualify for playoffs	Ken Oberkfell
2013	37-63	.370	5th in Canadian-American Association	Did not qualify for playoffs	Garry Templeton
Totals (1998–2013)	902-1036	.471	-	-	
Playoffs	7-3	.700	-	-	

- 2 Atlantic League Championships (2002, 2007)

== Rivalries ==
Shortly after the Newark Bears joined the Can-Am League, they announced a formal rivalry with the New Jersey Jackals. Since both teams played in Essex County, they established the County Executives' Cup to formalize this geographical contest.

== Radio ==
Bears games were aired on WSOU-FM 89.5 from 1999 to 2003, and again from 2007 to 2008. Previous announcers for the team include Seton Hall color commentator Dave Popkin, former WNEW-FM disc jockey Jim Monaghan, MLB Network host Victor Rojas, Somerset Patriots announcer Brian Bender, former New York Islanders broadcaster Jim Cerny, Jason Page, Ray Alexander, and Erie Otters broadcaster Paul Roper. In 2009, longtime New York sportscaster Spencer Ross served as both radio broadcaster and team on-field MC.

== Mascots ==
The Newark Bears' official mascots were anthropomorphic bears named Ruppert and Effa. They wore the team's home jersey and cap. Ruppert was named after Jacob Ruppert, who owned the former Newark Bears team in the 1930s. Effa alludes to Effa Manley, the first woman to own and operate a professional baseball team (the Newark Eagles) and the only female member of the National Baseball Hall of Fame.

== Retired numbers ==
21 (Roberto Clemente)
OF, retired in 2009
42 (Jackie Robinson)
2B, retired throughout professional baseball on April 15, 1997
1 (Quentin Davis)
OF, retired in 2012

== Notable former players ==
- Edgardo Alfonzo
- Armando Benítez
- José Canseco
- Ozzie Canseco
- Ramón Castro
- Carl Everett
- Jay Gibbons
- Rickey Henderson
- José Herrera
- Bobby Hill
- Doug Jennings
- Danny Kanell
- Steve Kent
- Al Levine
- Jim Leyritz
- José Lima
- Rob Mackowiak
- Rubén Mateo
- Hensley Meulens
- Tim Raines Jr.
- Jeriome Robertson
- Randall Simon

== See also ==
- Sports in Newark, New Jersey

Achievements
Preceded by Lancaster Barnstormers; 2006	Atlantic League Champions; Newark Bears; 2007	Succeeded by Somerset Patriots; 2008
Preceded by Somerset Patriots; 2002	Atlantic League Champions; Newark Bears; 2002	Succeeded by Somerset Patriots; 2003

Achievements
Preceded by Bridgeport Bluefish; 2006	North Division Champions; Newark Bears; 2007	Succeeded by Camden Riversharks; Liberty Division; 2008
Preceded by Somerset Patriots; 2001	South Division Champions; Newark Bears; 2002	Succeeded by Somerset Patriots; 2003
Preceded by Nashua Pride; 2000	North Division Champions; Newark Bears; 2001	Succeeded by Bridgeport Bluefish; 2002
