= Erie High School (Pennsylvania) =

Coordinates: 42.1020°N 80.0821°W

Location
- 3325 Cherry Street; Erie, Pennsylvania 16508; United States

Information
- Type: Public high school
- Established: 1957
- School district: Erie City School District
- Principal: Donald Orlando
- Teaching staff: 178.50 (FTE)
- Grades: 9-12
- Enrollment: 2,417 (2023-2024)
- Student to teacher ratio: 13.54
- Colors: Gold and Royal Purple
- Mascot: Rocky The Royal Lion
- Team name: Royals
- Website: eriesd.org/eriehigh

Erie High School is a high school in Erie, Pennsylvania, United States. Formerly called Central Tech High School, it was renamed in 2017 after the Erie City School District converted two of the other high schools, Strong Vincent High School and East High School, into middle schools.

The first Erie High School opened in 1866, before being renamed Central High School in 1920.

Erie High School celebrated its first graduating class in 2018, about 400 out of a total of 2,278 students.

== Academic Programs ==
Erie High School is a comprehensive high school, offering both academic classes and 18 different career and technical education programs.

The high school offers five different career pathways tailored to students’ interests:

- Arts and Communications, with focus areas in the performing arts, visual arts, and publishing arts;
- Business, Finance and Information Technology, with focus areas in marketing, sales, service, finance, information technology, and business management;
- Engineering and Industrial Technology, with focus areas in construction and architecture, manufacturing, engineering, and technology;
- Human Services, with focus areas in education, law, public safety and government, hospitality, and tourism;
- Science and Health, focusing on health and science, agriculture, food, natural resources, science, technology, and math.

Students participate in elective courses that reflect the focus areas of their chosen pathway, in addition to core academic courses.

Students may also choose to participate in one of 18 different Career and Technical Education programs, including automotive mechanics technology, automotive body technology, early childhood education, computer programming, construction trades, cosmetology, criminal justice, culinary arts, digital media, engineering, horticulture/landscape management, machine trades, marketing/business operations, medical assistant, nursing assistant, protective services, rehabilitation aide and welding. The school also plans to launch a new program for aspiring educators. Seniors and juniors who have completed their program requirements and are in good standing can also participate in a co-op program, in which local businesses employ them.

== Culture and Climate ==
The renaming of Central High School to Erie High School in 2017 prompted a rebranding with a focus on improving culture and climate. New school colors and a mascot were chosen, and a new brand was formed along with the new name: Erie High Royals. Athletic teams from Erie High and the district's two other high schools - Northwest Pennsylvania Collegiate Academy and the Patrick J. DiPaolo Student Success Center at Emerson-Gridley - play under the Royals banner.

In 2024, the district and United Way of Erie County expanded United Way's community school model to include Erie High School. The model aims to help support families and students by eliminating non-academic barriers to success.

== Major renovations ==
Under the leadership of Superintendent Brian J. Polito, the district undertook a major effort to ensure all of its buildings were "warm, safe, and dry" places for students to learn and staff members to work. A multimillion-dollar, multiple-phase renovation plan at Erie High that began in 2021 included new exterior construction at the entrance, new HVAC systems, electric, windows, furniture, and flooring, and new science labs, and major renovations to the gym and natatorium. Subsequent improvements to athletic facilities included the renovation of Biletnikoff Field, the installation of a regulation, all-weather track, and a new athletic entrance that features a concession area, restrooms, and direct access to the gym.
