= NPCA =

NPCA may stand for:

- National Parks Conservation Association
- National Peace Corps Association
- Niagara Peninsula Conservation Authority, in Ontario, Canada
- Northwest Pennsylvania Collegiate Academy, a high school in Erie, Pennsylvania
