= New Jersey State Fair =

Annual event in New Jersey, United States

Coordinates: 41°7′59″N 74°42′55″W

New Jersey State Fair/Sussex County Farm and Horse Show
- Incorporated in 1940
- Genre: Agricultural Fair
- Dates: August
- Locations: Augusta, New Jersey
- Website: The New Jersey State Fair

The New Jersey State Fair is a non-profit agricultural fair held in early August at the Sussex County Fairgrounds in Augusta, New Jersey. The fair has been held in conjunction with the Sussex County Farm and Horse Show since 1999 and draws 220,000 residents annually. The Augusta-based event was commonly referred to as the Sussex County Fair by locals. This fair is not affiliated with nor is to be confused with State Fair Meadowlands, which is a carnival held every June at the Meadowlands Sports Complex in East Rutherford, New Jersey.

== Mission statement ==
The stated mission of the New Jersey State Fair / Sussex County Farm and Horse Show is:

- to showcase New Jersey's agriculture;
- provide safe, family-friendly entertainment;
- present educational activities;
- promote youth development;
- give financial support to charitable non-profit agencies

== Summary ==
The New Jersey State Fair/Sussex County Farm and Horse Show is an annual event held during the first week of every August at the Sussex County Fairgrounds. A traditional agricultural fair, it offers livestock competitions, food tasting competitions, 4-H competitions and exhibitions, crafts, and AHSA-sanctioned horse competitions, including the Sussex County Grand Prix and the Show Jumping Hall of Fame Amateur-Owner Classic. Other fair favorites include an annual fiddlers contest, a Queen of the Fair competition, demolition derby, oxen and tractor pulls, carnival rides, and exhibits from local organizations. Fair proceeds are donated to local charities, which is a tradition dating to 1933.

The fair's roots extend back to 1923 when a Sussex County riding club held a horse show for the children of its members. The horse show thereafter expanded, and was held annually in Branchville, New Jersey, from 1933 to 1975, and then from 1976 to the present at its current location in Augusta, New Jersey. The fair was initially called the Sussex County Horse Show from 1936 to 1940, and then as the Sussex County Farm and Horse Show from 1940 to 1999. In 1999, the Sussex County Farm and Horse Show purchased the rights to the New Jersey State Fair name, which previously operated at Garden State Park in Cherry Hill, New Jersey, and was officially renamed the New Jersey State Fair/Sussex County Farm and Horse Show.

There was no fair from 1942 to 1945 because of World War II and 2020 due to the COVID-19 pandemic.

== Gallery ==
Constructing the American flag using K'NEX

Donkey judging contestant

Carnival ride

Honeybee exhibit
