= Paws (Detroit Tigers) =

Mascot of the Detroit Tigers baseball team

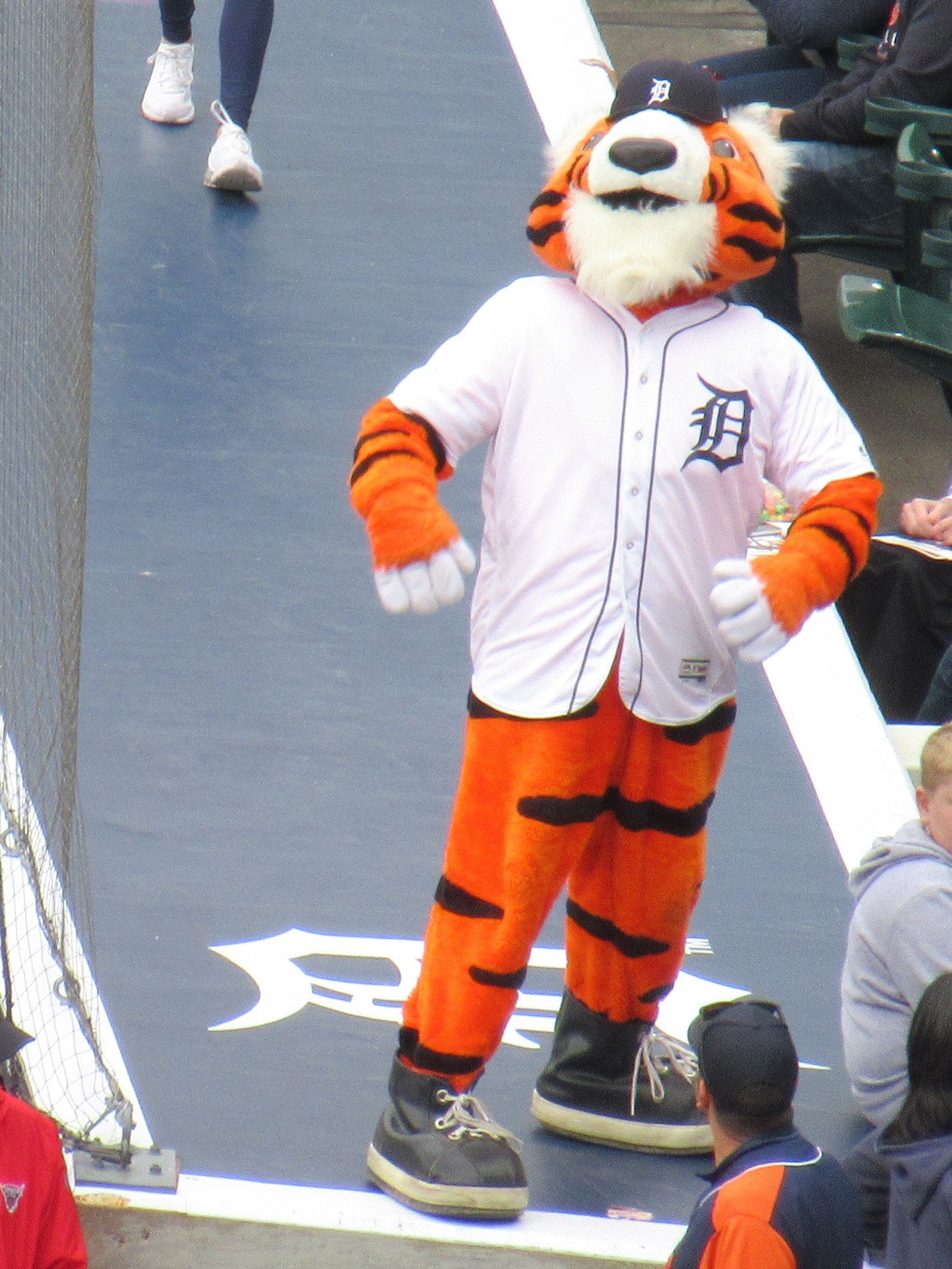
- PAWS dancing atop the home dugout
- Team: Detroit Tigers
- Description: Tiger
- Origin of name: Warner Bros. Family Entertainment
- First seen: May 5, 1995
- Website: Official Website

Paws (stylized in all caps) is the mascot of the Detroit Tigers. PAWS is an anthropomorphic Bengal tiger dressed in a Tigers jersey and cap.

== Character biography ==
Paws debuted as the official Tigers mascot on May 5, 1995, during a game against the Boston Red Sox at Tiger Stadium. Paws appears at every Tigers home game, as well as other events in the Detroit area. The Detroit Zoo is Paws's presenting sponsor.

Paws usually wears a navy blue Tigers cap and white home jersey, whose number usually corresponds to the current year (e.g. 10 during the 2010 season), but is changed to 00 when the year's number is retired. Paws's dress changes during certain themed nights at Comerica Park, such as a Santa Claus outfit during "Christmas in July" night, or an Elvis Presley-inspired outfit for Elvis Night.

A second version, a female tiger wearing an ankle-length dress and straw hat, said to be Paws's mother, appears on Mother's Day.
