= State Fair Meadowlands =

Annual Fair in East Rutherford, New Jersey

Coordinates: 40°48′38″N 74°04′32″W

Meadowlands State Fair

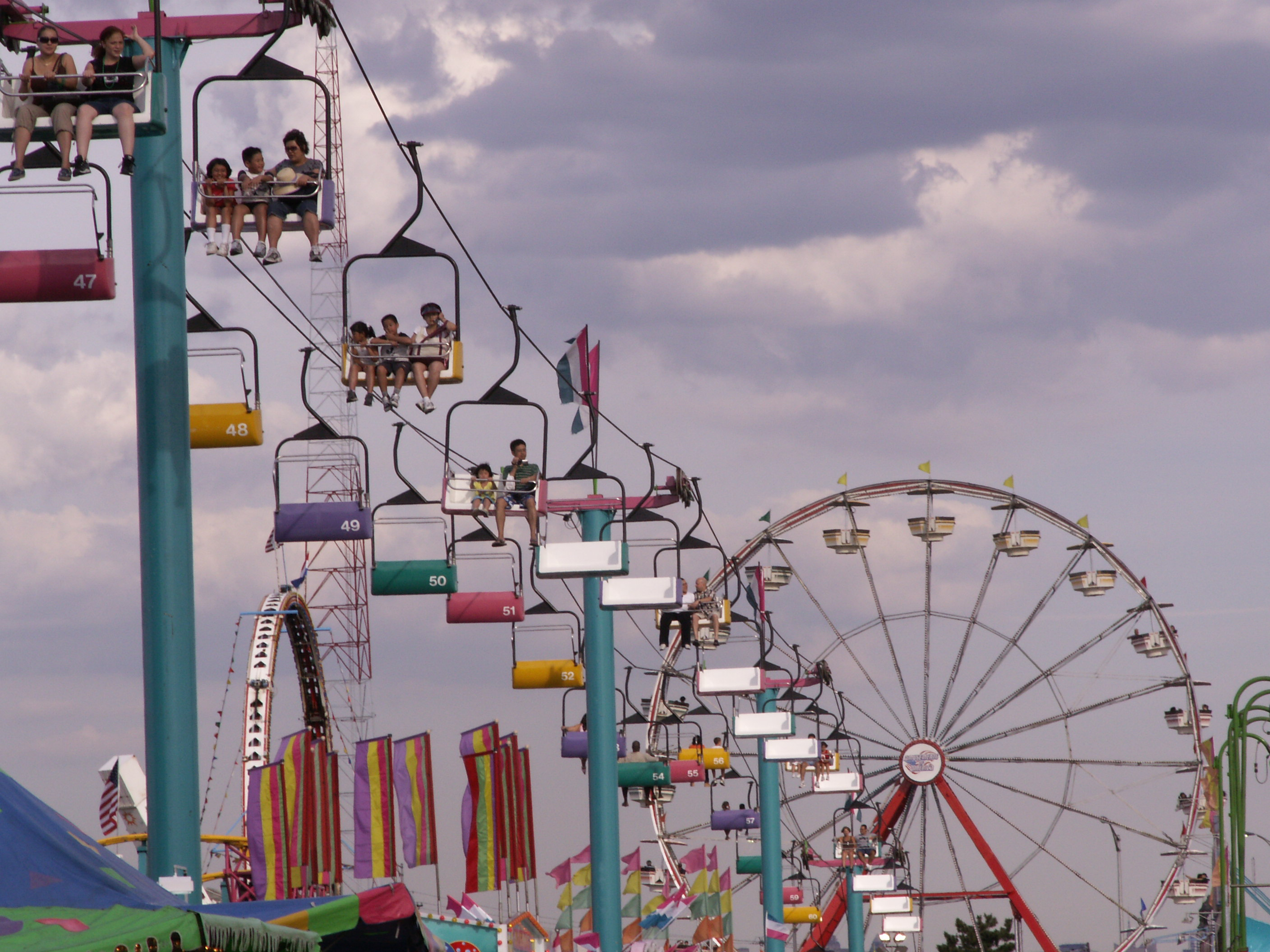
- State Fair Meadowlands, June 2007
- Status: Active
- Genre: State Fair
- Begins: June
- Ends: July
- Frequency: Annual
- Locations: Meadowlands Sports Complex in the parking lot of MetLife Stadium, East Rutherford, New Jersey
- Inaugurated: 1986; 40 years ago
- Attendance: 300,000 visitors per year
- Website: State Fair Meadowlands

The State Fair Meadowlands (formerly the Meadowlands Fair) is a carnival held every summer at the Meadowlands Sports Complex in East Rutherford, New Jersey. The fair is held in the parking lot that surrounds the MetLife Stadium and runs for two weeks in late June and early July. It attracts over 300,000 visitors per year, peaking at around 400,000 people in 2022.

Despite its name, it is not the official state fair of New Jersey, but instead, that honor belongs to the New Jersey State Fair, which purchased the state fair moniker in 1999. Instead, the name for the Meadowlands event is a title sponsorship; State Fair Superstore, a large seasonal merchandise seller and equipment rental company in Little Falls, New Jersey, operates the carnival.

== List of attractions ==
=== Family/Kiddie Rides ===
- Bumble Bee
- Construction Zone
- Merry-Go-Round
- Double-Decker Carousel
- Elephants
- Family Swinger
- Fire Chief
- Frog Hopper
- Speedway
- Go Gator
- Happy Swing
- Jalopy Junction
- Jet Ski/Waverunner
- Jungle of Fun
- Mini Bumper Boats
- Mini Himalaya
- Mini-Indy
- Monkey Mayhem
- Motorcycles
- Quadrunners
- Rainbow Rock
- Red Baron
- Rockin' Tug
- Safari Train
- Tomb of Doom
- VW Cars
- Wacky Worm

=== Thrill Rides ===
- Banzai
- Bumper Cars
- Cliffhanger
- Crazy Mouse
- Crazy Outback
- Cuckoo Fun House
- Darton Slide
- Disko
- Enterprise
- Fireball
- Giant Wheel
- Gravitron
- Haunted House Dark Ride
- Haunted Mansion Dark Ride
- Heavy Haulin’ Inflate
- Himalaya
- Magic Maze
- Mardi Gras Glasshouse
- Musik Express
- Raiders Funhouse
- Ring of Fire
- Rock & Roll Funhouse
- Rock 'n Roll
- Scooter
- Sizzler
- Sky Ride
- Skyflyer
- Space Roller
- Spongebob Funhouse
- Storybookland – Peter Pan's Palace
- Super Slide
- Tilt-A-Whirl
- Tornado (Wisdom)
- Wave Swinger
- Zipper
- Zyklon

== Other attractions ==
Other than the rides, there are free shows and events at the fair such as racing pigs, a petting zoo, a circus, a magic show, a hypnotist, concerts, etc. The fair also displays fireworks on select nights.

== Incidents ==
At around 11:30 PM on June 22, 2017, which was the opening night for the 2017 season of the fair, gunshots were fired on the fairgrounds. Guests ran away from the area where the shots were being fired off. No one was shot or injured.
