= Sussex County Farm and Horse Show =

Coordinates: 41.136709°N 74.715047°W

- Incorporated in 1940
- Genre: non-profit Agricultural Fair
- Dates: 01-09 August 2025
- Frequency: Annually
- Location: Augusta, New Jersey
- Inaugurated: 1923 in Sussex County, NJ
- Website: The New Jersey State Fair

The Sussex County Farm and Horse Show is a ten-day agricultural fair that is held at the Sussex County Fairgrounds in Augusta, New Jersey every August and attracts approximately 220,000 attendees annually. It has been run as a non-profit organization since 1940.

Since 1999, the Sussex County Farm and Horse Show has been designated the New Jersey State Fair.

== History of the Sussex County Farm and Horse Show ==
=== Branchville Riding Club and early horse shows ===
The origin of the Sussex County Farm and Horse Show dates back to 1919 with the formation of the Branchville Riding Club. At a time when automobiles were still a rare sight in the countryside, the horse was the primary mode of transportation. The Branchville Riding Club was established, however, for recreational riding, with its members riding together for pleasure to various destinations throughout the county.

In 1923, Walter R. Wright, the President of the Riding Club and proprietor of a riding stable at Culvers Lake, enlisted the aid of Mr. and Mrs. Condit Compton and Miss Lydia Bale, who was a well-known horsewoman in the county. Together, they organized a small horse show for Walter Wright's pupils at Rolison Farm. This first horse show was such a success that the Branchville Riding Club organized an open horse show at Ackerson Field, Ross's Corner the following year. This was the first of many such shows that would be held in the years to follow.

In 1926 the horse show was moved to a new ring on the William L. Bass Farm on the Old Newton Road. At the time, the Club charged 25 cents for admission and offered ribbons and trophies to sharpen the competition.

=== Branchville Fairgrounds ===
The Depression years intervened, however, and no horse shows were held until October 7, 1933 when members of the Branchville Riding Club organized the Branchville Community Horse Meet on the grounds of Selected Risks Insurance Company (now known as Selective Insurance Group, Inc.) in Branchville, New Jersey. The Club held the meet on the grounds of Selected Risks at the invitation of D.L.B. Smith, that company's founder and a horseman himself. He was also a horse show participant. The horse show would be held in this location for the next 43 years.

The 1933 horse show included 15 classes of competition with 51 participants, with the monies generated by the competition ($280.43) donated to the Sussex County Tuberculosis League. Prompted by the success of the 1933 show, the Sussex County Horse Show Association formed, with Augustus S. Whitmore as President, W.R. Decker as Secretary, and Lydia Bale as Treasurer.

The 1934 horse show saw a doubling of the number of participants, with similar numbers occurring in 1935, when attendance exceeded 1,000 spectators for the first time. The first “queen of the fair” competition took place during the 1935 horse show.

In 1936 the event officially incorporated as the Sussex County Horse Show. During that year, horse team pulling took center stage when a heavy-weight record pull of 9,840 pounds was achieved by Mike and Ike, a team owned by William H. Sanford and Son of Sparta Township. That record stood until 1955, when Bill and Rock, a team owned by Harold Daniels of Newark Valley, New York, pulled 10,695 pounds.

By 1938 the Sussex County Horse Show drew 3,000 spectators and was larger than any other outdoor show in the East. It was surpassed only by the National Horse Show held at Madison Square Garden.

=== Incorporation of the Sussex County Farm and Horse Show ===
In 1940, at the suggestion of Francis Morrow, the local representative of the Rutgers Cooperative Extension, the Sussex County Horse Show merged with several agricultural groups to re-incorporate as the Sussex County Farm and Horse Show. From that year forward, the event would be run as both a horse show and an agricultural fair. As a result of this merger, the new “fair” was expanded from a one-day event to a three-day event.

The Sussex County Farm and Horse Show was not held from 1942 through 1945 due to World War II. It returned in 1946 and, one year later, was expanded to a 4-day event to accommodate its continuing growth. In 1947, there were 10,000 paid admissions.

The horse events were officially recognized by the American Horse Shows Association in 1950, and one year later the Fair was expanded to a five-day event. With an attendance of 20,000 in 1952 (representing a 100% growth in 5 years!), the Sussex County Farm and Horse Show was rated the top horse show in attendance and exhibitor interest.

Disaster struck in 1955, however, when Hurricane Connie hit New Jersey hard just as the Fair was underway. The Branchville fairgrounds flooded, necessitating a rescue of the Fair's animals (from horses to 4-H animals). The Fair had to be closed one day early, resulting in a monitory loss that for the first time since 1933 prevented the Fair from donating money to local charities. The worst was yet to come, however. Five days after Hurricane Connie hit New Jersey, Hurricane Diane came raging through further stressing overflowing streams. Several local dams failed, and Branchville experienced approximately $1 million in property damage.

Despite closing one day early in 1955, admissions reached the 50,000 mark for the first time.

In 1958, the horse show at the Sussex County Farm and Horse Show was named an “honor show” by the American Horse Shows Association. At that time the horse show was attracting the best horse talent in the country and, by 1960, had 1500 entries and a complete junior division. The number of rings was increased to three rings and in 1963 and, in that same year, the Fair expanded to a six-day and night event. By 1965, the number of entries in the horse show increased to 2400 and attendance exceeded 65,000.

=== Augusta Fairgrounds ===
By the early 1960s it was apparent that the Sussex County Farm and Horse Show had outgrown the Branchville fairgrounds. Parking was limited and spilled out onto privately owned property, with local residents making enough money parking cars on their properties to pay for their taxes. In addition, internal pedestrian traffic was becoming dangerous due to the increased crowds of people within the crossings between the rings and the temporary stables. Lastly, the sheer size of the fair, which was entirely composed of temporary tent structures that had to be raised and then taken down at the close of the Fair, was becoming untenable.

In response to this, the Sussex County Farm and Horse Show formed a committee to locate suitable property to purchase for a new fairground. After limiting the number of sites to three, a farm owned by Bill McDanold's located in Augusta, New Jersey was purchased in 1963. It would be, however, many years before the move to the new property would be made.

On or about 1972, construction at the new grounds began first with the creation of a pond and several access roads. Construction accelerated several years later and in 1976 the Sussex County Farm and Horse Show moved to its new location in Augusta. This new location became known as the Sussex County Fairgrounds.

The opening of the new fairgrounds, however, did not go smoothly. In celebration of the nation's Bicentennial, each Sussex County township was encouraged to bring a float to the fairgrounds that would be paraded around the main ring on opening night. At the same time, admittance fees were collected not at the pedestrian entrance gates as they are today, but rather at the roadway access points as the attendees entered in their cars. The result is what many consider to have been the worst traffic jam to ever have occurred in Sussex County.

With property now under its ownership, the Sussex County Farm and Horse Show was able to construct permanent buildings. The first building constructed was the Walter Richards building, which houses the Home Economics Division exhibits, the art exhibits and, until 2006, the 4-H exhibits. Other permanent structures included the Livestock Pavilion, the Horse Show office, a variety of livestock stables, the Snook Museum and the Fair's administration building. The Fair's newest building is the Shotwell 4-H Building, opened in 2007 in honor of Phoebe and Ralph Shotwell for their many years of dedication to 4-H.

=== The New Jersey State Fair/Sussex County Farm and Horse Show ===
In 1999 the Sussex County Farm and Horse Show purchased the trademark for the New Jersey State Fair, and renamed itself the New Jersey State Fair/Sussex County Farm and Horse Show. Today, the Fair attracts approximately 220,000 attendees. It continues to maintain its agriculture and horse show roots through agricultural displays, and livestock and horse shows. Today's Fair also includes other types of entertainment including concerts, a petting zoo, a demolition derby, tractor pulls (standard and modified), carnival rides, pig races, lawnmower races, a chain saw art auction and many, many other activities that can be enjoyed by all ages.

The COVID-19 pandemic caused the 2020 show to be cancelled and deferred to 2021.
