= Erie Times-News =

Daily morning newspaper in Erie, Pennsylvania

- Type: Daily newspaper
- Format: Broadsheet
- Owner: USA Today Co.
- Editor: Matt Martin
- Founded: April 18, 1888
- Language: English
- Headquarters: 205 West 12th Street; Erie, Pennsylvania, United States
- Circulation: 29,557 Daily; 38,248 Sunday (as of 2018)
- OCLC number: 46862137
- Website: goerie.com

The Erie Times-News is a daily morning newspaper in Erie, Pennsylvania. It is owned by USA Today Co.

== The beginning ==
The newspaper was founded as the Erie Daily Times on April 12, 1888, by nine printers involved in a labor dispute at another newspaper. They each invested $25 to establish the Times Publishing Company, which was initially located in a cellar at the corner of 9th Street and State Street. John J. Mead Sr., one of the founders, eventually bought out his partners. The Mead family headed the newspaper until August 2003.

The newspaper relocated to West 10th Street and Peach Street on April 12, 1924.

== One company, two newspapers ==
The Times Publishing Company bought out the rival Erie Dispatch Herald in 1956 and co-located the two staffs in 1957 in the Dispatch Herald's building at East 12th and French streets. On January 7, 1957, the Erie Morning News made its debut. The Times Publishing Company built a new plant, housing a Goss Metro offset press, at 205 West 12th Street, moving there on June 6, 1970. As it had done since 1957, the company kept the editorial departments of the "Morning News" (The "Erie" was removed from the name during the 1960s) and the "Erie Daily Times" separate. The other departments served the entire operation. News and sports reporters shared desks, coming in on separate shifts. Members of both staffs occupied the "Times-News." In 1977, the two Saturday editions were combined into the "Times-News Weekender," a paper staffed only by "Morning News" reporters and editors. The company published the Morning News and the afternoon Erie Daily Times until September 29, 2000, and September 1, 2000, respectively. The company merged the two staffs and operations into the present-day Erie Times-News, which was first published on October 2, 2000.

During most of the 1970s through the late 1990s cousins Ed, Mike and Frank Mead operated the company growing it from two daily newspapers, the Warren Times-Observer and the Erie Times-News. The company was variously involved in radio (Florida), cable television (Millcreek Township and Edinboro) and local weekly/weekly newspapers in Northwestern Pennsylvania and California.

The fourth generation of family owners entered the business in various capacities including editorial (Marnie Mead and Matt Mead) and Sales and Marketing (Sara Mead, Karen Mead and Chris Mead). In 1997, Chris Mead created the newspaper's website, GoErie.com and a wholly owned subsidiary, CyberInk.

== Erie Times-News today ==
Since the merger, the Meads have gradually shifted day-to-day leadership of the newspaper outside the family. In August 2003, company Vice President James E. Dible was promoted to chief executive officer, president and publisher, succeeding the retiring Michael Mead, a grandson of the company founder. At about the same time, Michael Mead's first cousin, Edward M. Mead, stepped down as editor, turning over leadership of the newsroom to Executive Editor Rick Sayers. Michael Mead continues to serve on the company's board of directors.

The Erie Times-News was named the Pennsylvania NewsMedia Association's 2003 "Newspaper of the Year". PNA awarded second place to the newspaper in 2006. The "Newspaper of the Year status was repeated in 2009.

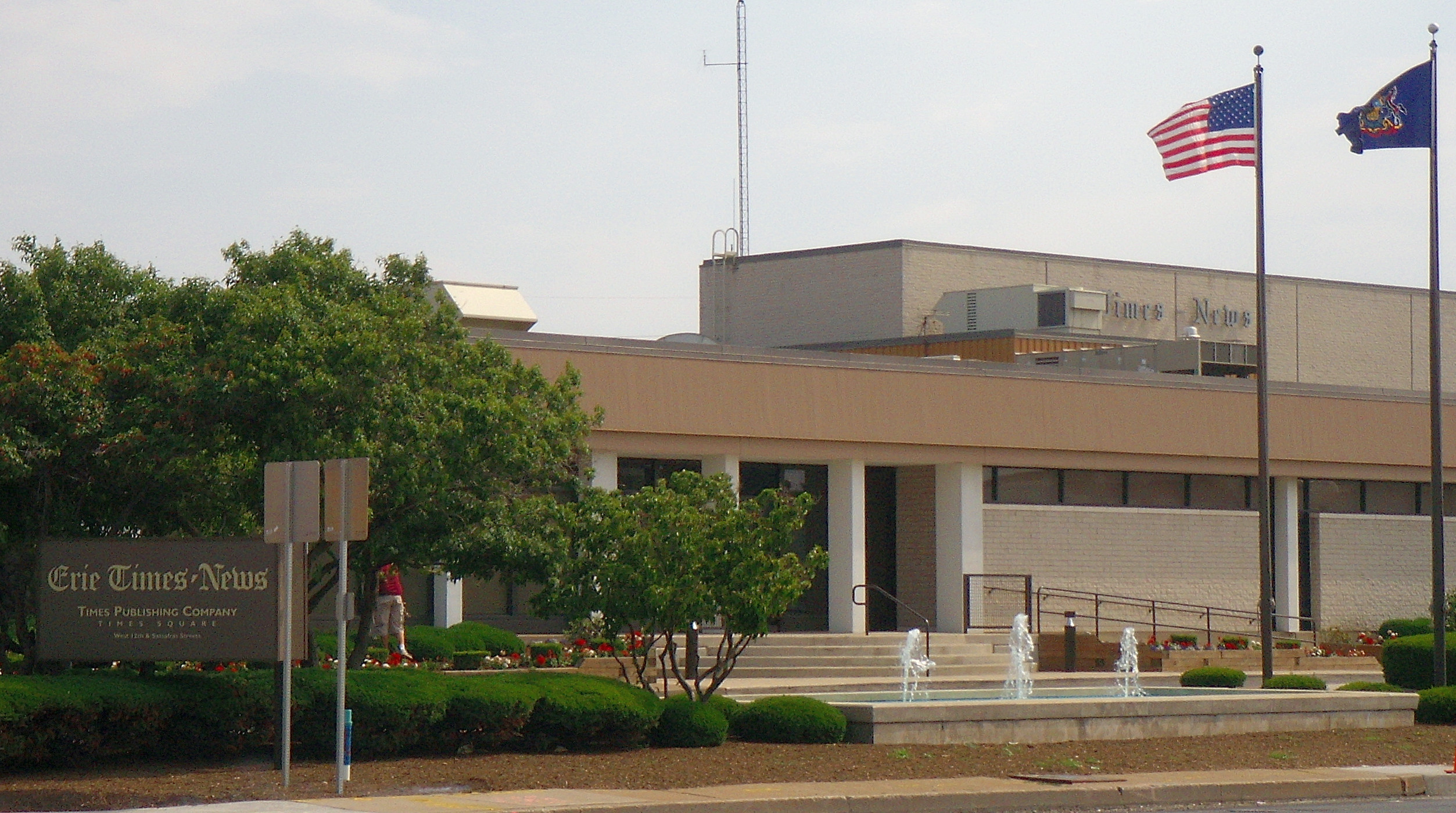
Offices of the Erie Times-News on West 12th Street

On January 16, 2006, the paper announced it was eliminating 24 positions immediately and would eliminate another 11 by February 3, leaving the Erie Times-News with about 250 employees. The paper also killed two of its three "Neighbors" zoned editions, a move that accounted for almost half of the initial 24 job cuts. Dible cited flat revenues and rising costs as the reason for the layoffs.

In September 2006, John Mead Flanagin was named chairman of the board. Flanagin is the first fourth-generation member of the Mead family to hold the position.

On September 13, 2007, the Erie Times-News named Rosanne M. Cheeseman to succeed the retiring James Dible as CEO and publisher of the newspaper as of October 1, 2007.

On October 6, 2009, the Erie Times-News announced that it had been awarded the "Newspaper of the Year" once again. The articles written about the Recession that were published in March and April were awarded honors as well.

On March 10, 2011, it was announced that 48 full-time and part-time employees of the Erie Times-News would be permanently laid off from their positions in the printing and packaging departments of the newspaper.

On April 12, 2013, the Erie Times-News celebrated its 125th anniversary.

On December 12, 2015, it was announced to Erie Times-News employees that the family-owned company will be sold to GateHouse Media (under New Media Investment Group) on January 12, 2016. The public was notified of the change in ownership on December 15, 2015.

In March 2022, The Erie Times-News moved to a six day printing schedule, eliminating its printed Saturday edition.

On February 8, 2024, the Erie Times-News announced it was switching from carrier to postal delivery.
