= Northwest Pennsylvania Collegiate Academy =

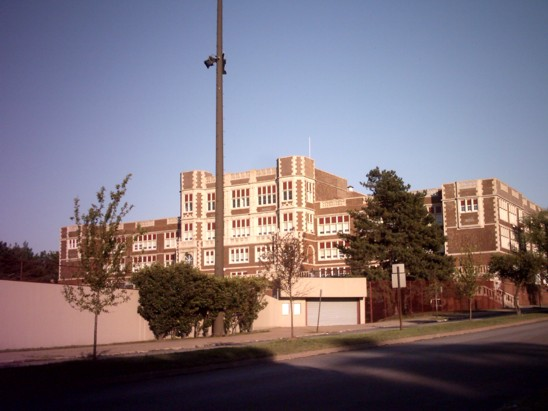
- NPCA overlooking Veteran's Stadium

Location
- 2825 State Street; Erie, Pennsylvania 16508; United States; 42.1102°N 80.0715°W

Information
- Type: Public, college-preparatory magnet school
- Motto: Pride, Honor, Respect
- Established: 1997
- Dean: James Vieira
- Dean, Performing Arts: Dana Gilmore
- Associate Dean: Katie Rivera
- Teaching staff: 54.00 (FTE)
- Enrollment: 748 (2023-2024)
- Student to teacher ratio: 13.85
- Colors: Blue and Gold
- Newspaper: The Pride
- Website: www.eriesd.org/npca

The Northwest Pennsylvania Collegiate Academy (abbreviated NPCA), or just Collegiate Academy or Academy High School, is located in midtown Erie, Pennsylvania. The school is housed in the former Academy High School building, which reopened in September 1997 as Collegiate Academy. The school boasts a 100% college acceptance rate among recent graduates.

== Admission requirements ==
- Grade point average of 3.0 or greater
- National standardized test scores at the 50th percentile or greater
- One teacher recommendation

Students from within the district are not required to pay tuition.

About 180 of the school's 861 students came from outside of the Erie school district for the 2010–2011 school year. Beginning with the 2011–2012 school year, home districts stopped paying the tuition costs and providing transportation. Currently enrolled out-of-district students for the 2011-2012 year paid a tuition of $3400 and incoming freshmen paid $4200. This resulted in many students returning to their home schools. In the 2012–2014 school year, the tuition cost for out-of-district freshmen increased to $5000. Collegiate Academy has about 225 openings for freshmen each year. There were 195 incoming freshmen for the Class of 2016. The admission standards were lowered after the 2012–2013 school year by lowering the requirement for a national standardized test scores at the 75th percentile or greater to a 50th percentile or greater and the number of teacher recommendations was lowered from two to one.

== Academic competitions ==
Collegiate Academy competitions are within the Academic Sports League. This is an extracurricular activity that allows students to compete in academic subject areas such as music, art, language, literature, math, and science.

Collegiate Academy's participation in the Academic Sports League has garnered national recognition through the United States Academic Decathlon. NPCA won its division (Division III) in the 2005 and 2009 national competitions and seventh overall in 2009. NPCA finished in third place in its division as well as ninth overall in 2008 and 2014. Collegiate Academy also earned Rookie of the Year honors in its division in 2001.

In 2015 the engineering students at Collegiate Academy won one of five national prizes in the National Samsung Solve for Tomorrow Contest. The contest required students to develop stem-driven projects that would benefit their own communities. Collegiate Academy's Vertical Veggies Project sought to feed families in urban settings. The school's grand prize was $120,000 worth of Samsung products.
