= East Field Stadium =

Stadium in Glens Falls, New York, US

Coordinates: 43.316861°N 73.627362°W

East Field is a stadium in Glens Falls, New York, United States, that opened in 1980. It is used for sporting events, mostly baseball and football. The ballpark has a capacity for 6,000 people.

== Teams ==
The complex is the former home of the Adirondack Lumberjacks, the Glens Falls White Sox/Glens Falls Tigers (an affiliate of the Chicago White Sox and Detroit Tigers), the Glens Falls Redbirds, and the Glens Falls Golden Eagles (Perfect Game Collegiate Baseball League).

East Field is the home of the Glens Falls Dragons, a collegiate summer league baseball team competing in the Perfect Game Collegiate Baseball League. The Dragons began in 2015, when a change in team ownership and front office replaced the former Glens Falls Golden Eagles.

The Glens Falls Greenjackets American football team of the Empire Football League compete there. The Greenjackets were founded in 1928, and are the second oldest semi-professional football team in the country. They have played at East Field since 1980.

== Events ==
East Field hosts the United States Collegiate Athletic Association College World Series and the National Junior College Athletic Association baseball World Series.

Beginning in 1981, A DCI sanctioned Drum and Bugle Corps event called "Adirondack Drums" and was organized by the Fort Edward Lions Club and performed annually until 2012. In 2018, the DCI sanctioned drum and bugle corps show was reborn as a fundraiser for the non-profit group "Friends of East Field" by Chris Reed, Jr. of the Glens Falls Music Academy. The revised event is known as the "Glens Falls Music Academy Showcase".
