= Ainsworth Field =

Baseball stadium in Erie, Pennsylvania

Coordinates: 42.1040°N 80.1023°W

- Interactive map of Ainsworth Field
- Former names: Athletic Field (1914–1947)
- Location: Washington Place; Erie, Pennsylvania 16502
- Owner: Erie School District
- Operator: Erie School District
- Capacity: 3,000
- Surface: Grass

Construction
- Groundbreaking: 1913
- Opened: 1914

Tenants
- Erie Sailors (Central League) (1928); Erie Sailors (Middle Atlantic League) (1938–1939, 1941–1942, 1946–1951); Erie Sailors (New York-Penn League) (1954–1959, 1961–1963); Erie Senators (New York-Penn League) (1960); Erie Tigers (New York-Penn League) (1967); Erie Cardinals (New York-Penn League) (1981–1987); Erie Orioles (New York-Penn League) (1988–1989); Erie Sailors (Frontier League) (1994); Erie Glenwood League Baseball (1995–present); Central Tech High School Falcons (1995–present); East High School (1995–present); Strong Vincent High School (1995–present)

Ainsworth Field is a 3,000 seat baseball stadium located in Erie, Pennsylvania. It hosted the Erie Sailors and other Erie-based minor league teams between 1928 and 1994. In 1995, it was made obsolete for professional use by the opening of UPMC Park. It was refurbished in 2004 and is currently used for high school and other amateur baseball games.

== History ==
In 1914, the ballpark opened under the name Athletic Field. The name was changed on August 25, 1947, to honor James "Doc" Ainsworth, a longtime adviser of Erie's youth. Babe Ruth and Ruth's All-Stars visited the ballpark in 1923 to play an exhibition game against the Erie Moose Club. Ruth's All-Stars won 15-1. Ruth had played first base. He had two singles and committed two errors. He also had a home run. There are many myths about where his home run ball landed. Some say it cleared past the adjacent Roosevelt Middle School, while others believe it entered the school's smoke stack.

In August 2024, minor restoration work began, with an aim to bring more usage to the stadium.
