= Augusta, New Jersey =

Place in Sussex County, New Jersey, United States

- Unincorporated community
- Location within Sussex County. Inset: Location of Sussex County within New Jersey Augusta, New Jersey (New Jersey) Augusta, New Jersey (the United States)
- Coordinates: 41°07′44″N 74°43′42″W
- Country: United States
- State: New Jersey
- County: Sussex
- Township: Frankford
- Elevation: 495 ft (151 m)

Population (2010 Census)
  - Total: 887
- ZIP code: 07822
- GNIS feature ID: 0874424

Augusta is an unincorporated community located within Frankford Township, in Sussex County, New Jersey, United States. As of the 2010 United States census, the population for the ZIP Code Tabulation Area 07822 was 887.

Augusta is the home of the New Jersey State Fair and the Sussex County Farm and Horse Show.

Skylands Park, a 5,500-seat ballpark, was home to the New Jersey Cardinals of the New York–Penn League from 1993 to 2005, and the Sussex Skyhawks of the Can-Am League from 2006 to 2010. The stadium is currently the home of the Sussex County Miners of the Frontier League, which debuted in the Can-Am League for the 2015 season.

== Geography ==
Augusta is located at 41°8'42" North, 74°41'5" West (41.145086, -74.684753).

Augusta lies in the Kittatinny Valley which is part of the Great Appalachian Valley. The Kittatinny Mountains are to the west and the New Jersey Highlands are to the east.

== Geology ==
Augusta lies on top of the Ordovician Martinsburg Formation, created around 450 million B. C. when a volcanic chain of islands collided with the proto North American Plate. The islands rode over top of the North American Plate creating the valley. The valley was under a shallow sea until geologic pressure forced the shale upwards.

The Wisconsin Glacier covered the valley from 21,000 B.C. to 13,000 B.C. Augusta was covered in three hundred meters of ice. When the ice slowly melted this created the Paulinskill River as well as Papakatkin Creek.

The Paulinskill River, which starts in Newton and flows westerly through Augusta from Lafayette, drains into the Delaware River to the southwest. The Paulinskill is one of the premier fishing streams in the state of New Jersey. Each year, thousands of trout are stocked in the Paulinskill River from the New Jersey Division of Fish and Wildlife.

Papakatkin Creek drains into the Wallkill River to the north. The drainage divide is just north of Route 206 in Augusta. A chain of hills leads Papakatkin Creek to travel east and then north into the Wallkill River.

== Notable people ==
People who were born in, residents of, or otherwise closely associated with Augusta include:

- Russ Van Atta (1906–1986), MLB pitcher who played with the New York Yankees and St. Louis Browns and was later elected as Sheriff of Sussex County.
