= Erie City School District =

School district in Pennsylvania

Coordinates: 42.1311°N 80.0865°W

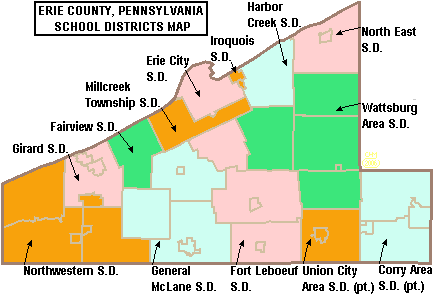

Location
- Erie, Pennsylvania City of Erie United States

District information
- Type: Public
- Grades: PreK-12
- Established: 1870
- Superintendent: Dr. Natalyn Gibbs

Students and staff
- Students: 10,719
- Teachers: 902
- Staff: 1,776 (including Teachers)

Other information
- Website: www.eriesd.org

The Erie City School District is the school district that serves Erie, Pennsylvania in the United States. It is a member of the Northwest Tri-County IU 5.

== Schools ==
As of 2025, the Erie City School District operates 16 schools and several more programs serving approximately 10,719 students. These include ten elementary schools, three middle schools, two high schools, and several non-traditional or alternative programs.

=== Elementary schools (PreK–5) ===
- Diehl Elementary School
- Edison Elementary School
- Grover Cleveland Elementary School
- Harding Elementary School
- Jefferson Elementary School
- JoAnna Connell Elementary School
- Lincoln Elementary School
- McKinley Elementary School
- Perry Elementary School
- Pfeiffer-Burleigh Elementary School

=== Middle schools (6–8) ===
- East Middle School
- Strong Vincent Middle School
- Woodrow Wilson Middle School

=== High schools (9–12) ===
- Erie High School
- Northwest Pennsylvania Collegiate Academy

=== Non-traditional and alternative programs (K–12) ===
- Patrick J. DiPaolo Student Success Center at Emerson-Gridley, which includes:
  - EPS Cyber Choice Academy (K–12 virtual program)
  - Accelerated Learning Academy (Grades 9–12)
  - Bridges Academy (Grades 9–12)
- Eagle’s Nest Program of Academic Distinction
- Erie Intervention Center, including the Sanctuary Based Learning
