= Erie Sailors =

Minor league baseball team in Erie, Pennsylvania

- 1905–1994; (1905–1916, 1928–1932, 1938–1942, 1944–1994); Erie, Pennsylvania
Team logo
Cap insignia

Minor league affiliations
- Previous classes: Independent (1994); Short-Season A (1964–1993); Class A (1963); Class D (1954–1962); Class C (1946–1951); Class D (1944–1945); Class C (1938–1942); Class B (1928–1932); Class D (1916); Class B (1912–1915); Class C (1908–1911); Class D (1905–1908)
- League: Frontier League (1994)
- Previous leagues: New York–Penn League (1957–1967, 1981–1993); Penn.-Ontario-New York League (1954–1956); Middle Atlantic League (1946–1951); Penn.-Ontario-New York League (1944–1945); Middle Atlantic League (1938–1942); Central League (1928–1932); Interstate League (1916); Central League (1915); Canadian League (1914); Interstate League (1913); Central League (1912); Ohio–Pennsylvania League (1908–1911); Interstate League (1905–1908)

Major league affiliations
- Previous teams: Texas Rangers (1993); Florida Marlins (1992); Baltimore Orioles (1988); St. Louis Cardinals (1981–1987); Detroit Tigers (1967); Minnesota Twins (1961–1963); Washington Senators (1960); Detroit Tigers (1957–1959); Washington Senators (1951, 1954–1956); New York Giants (1944–1950); Cincinnati Reds (1939); Boston Bees (1938); New York Yankees (1932)

Minor league titles
- League titles: 8 (1906, 1941, 1942, 1946, 1948, 1949, 1957, 1994)

Team data
- Previous names: Erie Sailors (1990–1994); Erie Orioles (1988–1989); Erie Cardinals (1981–1987); Erie Tigers (1967); Erie Sailors (1957–1963); Erie Senators (1954–1956); Erie Sailors (1916–1951); Erie Yankees (1914); Erie Sailors (1908–1913); Erie Fishermen (1908); Erie Sailors (1906–1907); Erie Fishermen (1905)
- Mascot: The Sea Gull (1990-1994)
- Previous parks: Ainsworth Field

The Erie Sailors was the primary name of several minor league baseball teams which played in Erie, Pennsylvania, between 1906 and 1994.

== Pre-1930s ==
Several unrelated teams used the Erie Sailors name in the Interstate League (1906–1907, 1913, 1916), the Ohio–Pennsylvania League (1908–1911), and the Central League (1912, 1915, 1928–30, 1932).

== 1938–1963 ==
During these years, the Erie Sailors played in the Middle Atlantic League from 1938–1939, 1941–1942, and 1946–1951; the Pennsylvania–Ontario–New York League (PONY League) from 1944–1945 and 1954–1956; and the PONY's successor New York – Penn League from 1957–1963. Several times during this period, the team was also called the Erie Senators, after its major league affiliate, the Washington Senators. The Sailors won the league championship in 1957. The Sailors won the regular season by nine games in 1951. They then lost the league championship series to the Niagara Falls Citizens, four games to two.

From 1948 onward, this team (and all subsequent Sailors teams) played at Ainsworth Field.

== New York–Penn League – 1990s ==
In 1990, after the Baltimore Orioles ended their affiliation with the team (then known as the Erie Orioles), they reclaimed the Sailors name and operated as an unaffiliated minor league team for two years before becoming the Florida Marlins' first farm team in 1992 and a Texas Rangers affiliate in 1993. Because of the deteriorating condition of Ainsworth Field, the team moved after the 1993 season to Fishkill, New York and then became the Hudson Valley Renegades.

== Frontier League ==
In 1994, the Sailors were a team in the independent Frontier League, winning the league championship in their only year of existence as a member of the Frontier League. In 1995, the Erie SeaWolves moved to town, displacing the Sailors, forcing the franchise to move to Johnstown, Pennsylvania as the Johnstown Steal/Johnnies and then to Florence, Kentucky as the Florence Y'alls.

== Notable alumni ==
=== Hall of Fame Alumni ===
- Chief Bender (manager, 1932) Inducted, 1953

=== Other notable alumni ===
- Vic Aldridge (1915)
- Luis Alicea (1986)
- Pete Appleton (1951)
- George Bamberger (1946)
- Joe Boever (1982)
- Billy Gilbert (1912)
- Frank Gilhooley (1912)
- Bernard Gilkey (1985)
- Fredi Gonzalez (1992)
- Lance Johnson (1984) MLB All-Star
- Pat Kelly (1962) MLB All-Star
- Paul LaPalme (1942)
- John Lynch (1992) NFL HOF and 49ers GM
- Dick McAuliffe (1957) 3 x MLB All-Star
- Cliff Melton (1932) MLB All-Star
- Jim Merritt (1962) MLB All-Star
- Tom Pagnozzi (1983) MLB All-Star
- Frank Quilici (1961)
- Arthur Rhodes (1989) MLB All-Star
- Buck Rodgers (1957) 1987 NL Manager of the Year
- Dean Stone (1951) MLB All-Star
- Bobby Tolan (1988-1989)
- Todd Worrell (1982) 3 x MLB All-Star; 1986 NL Rookie of the Year
- Todd Zeile (1986)
- Robert Matta

== Year-by-year record ==
Year	Record	Finish	Manager	Playoffs
1905	58-39	2nd	Daniel Koster, Bob McLaughlin & Jack Burke	
1906	65-41	1st	Tom O'Hara	League Champs
1907	64-51	1st	Thomas Reynolds	
1908	4-12	6th	Frank Baumeister	League disbanded on June 5
1908	37-53 (42-79 overall)	8th	Daniel Koster, Walter East & Richard Nallin	Butler moved to Erie June 15
1909	48-69	6th	Milt Montgomery, Red Davis & W. Broderick	none
1910	55-69	8th	Matthew Broderick	none
1911	77-54	3rd	William Gilbert	none
1912	75-55	3rd	William Gilbert	none
1913	57-21	1st	Larry Quinlan	League disbanded July 21
1914	64-57	3rd	Charles Smith & Frank Gygli	
1915	64-58	5th	Larry Quinlan	none
1916	26-37	--	Bill Bradley	Team disbanded August 9
1928	76-59	1st	Henry Wetzel	Lost League Finals
1929	78-61	2nd	Jocko Munch	none
1930	76-63	2nd	Jocko Munch	none
1932	85-56	1st	Chief Bender & Bill McCorry	
1938	52-75	7th	Jocko Munch	
1939	55-73	8th	Jocko Munch	
1941	75-51	2nd	Kerby Farrell	League Champs
1942	63-65	4th	Kerby Farrell	League Champs
1944	61-63	6th	Bill Harris	
1945	46-77	7th	Bill Harris	
1946	91-39	1st	Steve Mizerak	League Champs
1947	68-56	3rd	Don Cross	Lost in 1st round
1948	80-44	2nd	Don Ramsay	League Champs
1949	85-53	1st	Pete Pavich	League Champs
1950	63-52	3rd	Pete Pavich	Lost in 1st round
1951	85-40	1st	Pete Appleton	Lost League Finals
1954	45-81	8th	Tom O'Connell, Nap Reyes, Thomas Milich, Joe Consoli, & Thomas Milich	
1955	66-60	5th	Ted Sepkowski	
1956	45-74	6th	Johnny Welaj	
1957	70-47	2nd	Chuck Kress	League Champs
1958	53-72	7th	Steve Gromek	
1959	49-76	8th	Al Lakeman / Pat Mullin / Al Lakeman	
1960	83-46	1st	Harry Warner	Lost League Finals
1961	68-57	2nd	Harry Warner	Lost in 1st round
1962	68-51	2nd	Frank Franchi	Lost in 1st round
1963	57-73	6th	Frank Franchi	
1967	26-51	6th	Eddie Lyons	
1981	44-30	4th	Sonny Ruberto	
1982	35-38	6th	Joe Rigoli	
1983	37-38	7th	Joe Rigoli	
1984	43-31	4th	Rich Hacker	
1985	44-34	5th	Fred Koenig	
1986	37-40	7th	Joe Rigoli	
1987	36-39	9th	Joe Rigoli	
1988	46-31	4th	Bobby Tolan	
1989	25-49	14th	Bobby Tolan	
1990	44-33	3rd	Mal Fichman	Lost League Finals
1991	37-41	8th	Barry Moss	Lost in 1st round
1992	40-37	4th	Fredi González	Lost League Finals
1993	36-41	10th	Doug Sisson	
1994	42-25	2nd	Mal Fichman	League Champs
