= Manch Wheeler =

American football player (1939–2018)

No. 12
- Position: Quarterback

Personal information
- Born: March 2, 1939; Augusta, Maine
- Died: August 11, 2018 (aged 79); Bangor, Maine
- Listed height: 6 ft 0 in (1.83 m)
- Listed weight: 195 lb (88 kg)

Career information
- High school: Phillips Academy (Andover, Massachusetts)
- College: Maine
- NFL draft: 1962: undrafted

Career history
- Buffalo Bills (1962); Portland Sea Hawks (1964); Hartford Charter Oaks (1965); Waterbury Orbits (1966-1967); Hartford Knights (1968); Portland Loggers (1969)
- Stats at Pro Football Reference

Manchester Haynes Wheeler (March 2, 1939 – August 11, 2018) was an American football quarterback. He played college football at the University of Maine, serving as a versatile utility player who kicked and played defense in addition to quarterbacking in a brief revival of the one-platoon system era.

He played four games in the American Football League with the Buffalo Bills, serving as backup to Jack Kemp, before the team signed Daryle Lamonica the following season.

Wheeler spent much of his career as a quarterback in the minor leagues, playing in the Atlantic Coast Football League and the Continental Football League. His most successful season was in 1968, when, mostly acting as a game manager in a run-heavy offense that included Marv Hubbard and Mel Meeks, he led the Hartford Knights to a 15–1 season before being unceremoniously benched in the Atlantic Coast Football League championship in favor of rookie Dick Faucette. Following that season, he left to join his final team, the Continental Football League's Portland Loggers.

== See also ==
- Other American Football League players
