= Andy Nelson (American football) =

American football player and coach (1933–2025)

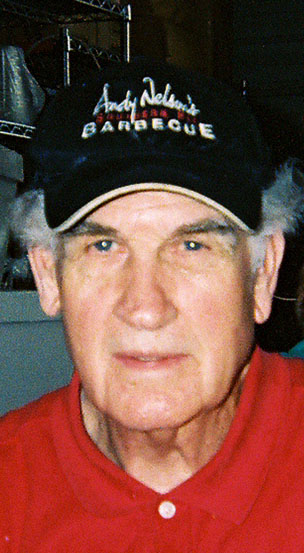

No. 80, 26
- Position: Safety

Personal information
- Born: May 27, 1933; Athens, Alabama, U.S.
- Died: September 12, 2025 (aged 92)
- Listed height: 6 ft 1 in (1.85 m)
- Listed weight: 180 lb (82 kg)

Career information
- High school: Athens
- College: Memphis
- NFL draft: 1957: 11th round, 126th overall pick

Career history

Playing
- Baltimore Colts (1957–1963); New York Giants (1964); Atlanta Falcons (1966)*; Harrisburg Capitols (1967-1968)
- * Offseason or practice squad member only

Coaching
- Harrisburg Capitols (1967-1968) Assistant; Harrisburg Capitols (1969) Head coach; Pottstown Firebirds (1970) Defensive; Norfolk Neptunes (1971) Assistant; Philadelphia Bell (1974) Defensive backs

Awards and highlights
- 2× NFL champion (1958, 1959); First-team All-Pro (1959); Second-team All-Pro (1958); Pro Bowl (1960)

Career NFL statistics
- Interceptions: 33
- Fumble recoveries: 3
- Total touchdowns: 3
- Stats at Pro Football Reference

Andrew Vaughan Nelson (May 27, 1933 – September 12, 2025) was an American professional football player who was a safety in the National Football League (NFL) for the Baltimore Colts and New York Giants. He played college football for the Memphis Tigers and was selected by the Colts in the 11th round of the 1957 NFL draft. Nelson owned and ran a small BBQ establishment, Andy Nelson's Barbecue.

== Early life ==
Andy was born on May 27, 1933, in Athens, Alabama, where his father Guy was chief pitmaster for Limestone County. He was a four-sport athlete at Athens High School playing football, basketball, track and baseball, serving as co-captain of the 1951 team and winning letters for each of his four years he completed. Nelson played quarterback and defensive back for then-Memphis State College. A four-year letterman (1952–1956), he gained All-American recognition in his senior season. In 1956, he led the Tigers to their first-ever bowl game, the Burley Bowl in Johnson City, Tennessee, where they were victorious over East Tennessee State.

== Professional career ==
Nelson was drafted by the Baltimore Colts in the eleventh round of the 1957 NFL draft. Having played both quarterback and defensive back in college, the Colts made him a defensive player. Nelson started 12 games his rookie season, with five interceptions for 29 yards. The following season, Nelson recorded eight interceptions for 199 yards and one touchdown. The Colts went on to win the NFL Championship in what was the NFL's first sudden-death overtime game and has since become widely known as "The Greatest Game Ever Played". The Colts repeated in 1959 and over his seven-year career with the Colts, Nelson racked up 33 total interceptions for 378 yards and 3 touchdowns. The Colts traded Nelson to the New York Giants for the 1964 season, his last in the NFL.

== Coaching career ==
Nelson spent two years as a player and defensive coach with the Harrisburg Capitols of the Atlantic Coast Football League, the Colts' farm team, where he led the league in pass defense before going on to be named the head football coach. Nelson went on to become Defensive Coordinator for the Norfolk Neptunes, winning a league championship in 1971, and then the Chambersburg Cardinals of the Seaboard Football League, winning another championship in 1973. Nelson was also defensive coordinator for Philadelphia Bell in the World Football League from 1974–75.

== Restaurant ==
Andy Nelson's Barbecue is a BBQ restaurant in Cockeysville, Maryland. It is known for its hickory smoked BBQ. The restaurant regularly wins "Baltimore's Best BBQ" by Baltimore Magazine and the City Paper.

== Personal life and death ==
Nelson met his future wife, Bettye J. Bryan, while attending Memphis State College. They married during her second year. They had seven children, four of whom worked at Nelson's barbecue restaurant. He died on September 12, 2025, at the age of 92.

== Awards ==
Nelson was voted into the Limestone County Hall of Fame (2003) in Alabama and the Memphis State Hall of Fame (1976). He was selected to the NFL's All-Pro team in 1958 and 1959, and the NFL's Pro Bowl in 1960. He was selected by Sporting News for their 1st-Team All-NFL in 1958, 1959 and 1960.
