= Stamford Golden Bears =

Defunct American football team

- Founded: 1962
- Folded: 1962
- League: Atlantic Coast Football League
- Based in: Stamford, Connecticut
- Arena: Boyle Stadium

The Stamford Golden Bears were a minor league American football team based in Stamford, Connecticut. They played one season in the Atlantic Coast Football League (ACFL) in 1962 and played their home games at Boyle Stadium in Stamford.

== History ==
The Golden Bears were one of several ACFL teams to be based out of Connecticut, including the Ansonia Black Knights, Bridgeport Jets, Waterbury Orbits, Hartford Charter Oaks, and the Hartford Knights.

Stamford went 2-7 in its only season in the ACFL in 1962. The team was coached by Sam Coppola. The Golden Bears two wins in ACFL play were wins over the Frankfort Falcons 14-0 and the Ansonia Black Knights 32-27. The leading scorers for Stamford during the 1962 season were Bruno Amato (4 touchdowns) and Bill Meade (3 touchdowns). Coppola was also the team's quarterback along with Red Jackson.
