= Tom Kopp =

American baseball player and football coach (1938–2007)

Biographical details
- Born: September 18, 1938; Waterbury, Connecticut, U.S.
- Died: November 10, 2007 (aged 69); Belgrade, Maine, U.S.

Playing career

Baseball
- 1959–1961: Connecticut
- 1961: Wytheville Twins
- 1961–1962: Fort Walton Beach Jets

Football
- 1958–1960: Connecticut
- 1962: Stamford Golden Bears
- 1962-1963: Ansonia Black Knights
- Positions: Catcher, outfielder (baseball); Quarterback, running back (football)

Coaching career (HC unless noted)

Football
- 1963–1965: Avon HS (CT)
- 1966–1970: Connecticut (DB)
- 1971–1977: Dartmouth (DB)
- 1978: Colby (DB)
- 1979–1982: Colby

Head coaching record
- Overall: 9–24 (college)

Thomas Warren Kopp (September 18, 1938 – November 10, 2007) was an American minor league baseball player and college football coach. He also played minor league football player in the Atlantic Coast Football League. He served as the head football coach at Colby College from 1979 to 1982.

== Playing ==
Kopp was born on September 18, 1938 in Waterbury, Connecticut. He graduated from Naugatuck High School, where he letted in football, baseball, and basketball all four years. He attended the University of Connecticut and played tailback for the Connecticut Huskies football team. Kopp's first season as a varsity player was ended due to injury. As a junior, he finished second in the Yankee Conference with 26 points scored and was named a second team All New England football player by the Associated Press. Along with Bill Minnerly, Kopp was a co-captain of the 1960 Connecticut Huskies football team. Kopp was the Huskies' leading passer that season, completing 12 of 48 attempts for 205 yards. He also rushed for 162 yards on 59 carries. After graduating, Kopp played two seasons in the Atlantic Coast Football League. He started the 1962 season with the Stamford Golden Bears before joining the Ansonia Black Knights in September. He returned to the Black Knights the following year, but suffered a season-ending injury in the team's August 25, 1963 game against the Portland Sea Hawks.

Kopp was also an All-Yankee Conference catcher for the UConn Huskies baseball team and helped lead them to the 1959 College World Series. In June 1961, he signed with the Minnesota Twins and was assigned to the Class D affiliate, the Wytheville Twins. After three games, he was reassigned to the Fort Walton Beach Jets, where he played 132 games over two seasons.

== Coaching ==
Kopp began his coaching career at Avon High School in Avon, Connecticut. He coached Avon to the state Class C Championship in 1964 and 1965. In 1966, he returned to the University of Connecticut as an assistant football coach. In 1971, he took the same job at Dartmouth College.

In 1978, Kopp joined the athletic staff at Colby College as an assistant football and baseball coach. The following year, he was promoted to head coach after Dick McGee resigned due to his increased administrative work as athletic director. After posting a winning record (5–3) in Kopp's inaugural season, the Mules fell to 1–7 in 1980, 2–7 in 1981, and 1–7 in 1982. He left coaching in 1983 to become Colby's assistant dean of admissions. He remained a member of the admissions office until his death following a boating accident on November 10, 2007.
