= Fran Mallick =

American football player (born 1968)

- Mallick, circa 1965

No. 61, 82, 84
- Position: Defensive lineman

Personal information
- Born: February 25, 1941; McKeesport, Pennsylvania, U.S.
- Died: April 17, 2025 (aged 84)
- Listed height: 6 ft 2 in (1.88 m)
- Listed weight: 245 lb (111 kg)

Career information
- High school: Glassport
- College: None

Career history
- Pittsburgh Valley Ironmen (1963–1964); Pittsburgh Steelers (1965); Hartford Charter Oaks (1966–1967); Washington Redskins (1968)*; Hartford Knights (1968–1970)
- * Offseason or practice squad member only
- Stats at Pro Football Reference

Francis Joseph Mallick (February 25, 1941 – April 17, 2025) was an American professional football defensive lineman who played for the Pittsburgh Steelers of the National Football League (NFL). He did not play college football. The first time he ever played football was on a service team in the military.

== Early life ==
Francis Joseph Mallick was born on February 25, 1941, in McKeesport, Pennsylvania. He played baseball and basketball at Glassport High School.

Mallick served in the United States Air Force. The first time he ever played football was on a service team in the military while stationed in England. His coach from England said he was going to get Mallick a scholarhisp to play college football at Colorado State. However, Mallick was tired of waiting and signed with the Pittsburgh Valley Ironmen of the Atlantic Coast Football League (ACFL).

== Professional career ==
Mallick played for the Ironmen from 1963 to 1964 and scored an interception-return touchdown in 1964. He signed with the Pittsburgh Steelers in 1965 but was released on September 14, 1965, before the start of the regular season. He was then signed to the Steelers' taxi squad. Mallick was promoted to the active roster on November 12 and played in the final six regular season games as a reserve defensive lineman. He became a free agent after the 1965 season and re-signed with the Steelers on July 6, 1966. He was released on August 30, 1966.

Mallick signed with the Hartford Charter Oaks of the Continental Football League (COFL) on September 1, 1966. He played for the Oaks during the 1966 and 1967 COFL seasons, scoring a seven-yard interception-return touchdown in 1967. He signed with the Washington Redskins in 1968 but was released on July 29, 1968, during training camp.

Mallick then returned to the ACFL, signing with the Hartford Knights on August 10, 1968. He played for the Knights from 1968 to 1970, earning All-ACFL honors in 1968 and 1969. He suffered a career-ending knee injury.

== Personal life ==
After his football career, Mallick worked for Iron Workers Local 15 for over 20 years and also worked part-time with the Newington, Connecticut Police Department. He later started a limousine business. He died on April 17, 2025.
