= Karl Kaimer =

American football player (born 1938)

No. 81, 86, 84, 82, 83
- Position: Tight end

Personal information
- Born: November 12, 1938 (age 87); Elizabeth, New Jersey, U.S.
- Listed height: 6 ft 3 in (1.91 m)
- Listed weight: 230 lb (104 kg)

Career information
- High school: Cranford (Cranford, New Jersey)
- College: Boston University
- NFL draft: 1962: undrafted

Career history
- New York Titans (1962)*; Toledo Tornadoes (1962); New York Titans/Jets (1962); Newark Bears (1963–1964); Jersey City Giants/Jersey Jets (1964–1966); Westchester Bulls (1967); Bridgeport Jets (1968)
- * Offseason or practice squad member only
- Stats at Pro Football Reference

Karl Julius Kaimer (born November 12, 1938) is an American former professional football tight end who played one season with the New York Titans of the American Football League (AFL). He played college football at Dean Junior College and Boston University. He was also a member of the Toledo Tornadoes of the United Football League (UFL), and the Newark Bears, Jersey City Giants/Jersey Jets, Westchester Bulls, and Bridgeport Jets of the Atlantic Coast Football League (ACFL).

== Early life and college ==
Karl Julius Kaimer was born on November 12, 1938, in Elizabeth, New Jersey. He participated in football, basketball, and track at Cranford High School in Cranford, New Jersey. He was a team captain in football and the Union County javelin champion in track. Kaimer helped the basketball team win the state title in 1956. He graduated from Cranford High in 1957. He was inducted into Cranford High's athletics hall of fame in 1996.

Kaimer first played college football at Dean Junior College from 1958 to 1959. He was then a two-year letterman for the Boston University Terriers of Boston University from 1960 to 1961. He also participated in track and lacrosse at Boston University.

== Professional career ==
After going undrafted in 1962, Kaimer signed with the New York Titans of the American Football League on June 16, 1962. He was cut by the Titans on August 29, 1962. He then played for the Toledo Tornadoes of the United Football League (UFL) during the 1962 season and caught one touchdown. Kaimer was later signed to the Titans' taxi squad. On October 24, 1962, it was reported that he had been promoted to the active roster. He then played in eight games, starting one, for the Titans during the 1962 season. Kaimer was released by the newly-renamed New York Jets on August 30, 1963.

Kaimer played for the Newark Bears of the Atlantic Coast Football League (ACFL) in 1963 and scored two receiving touchdowns. He re-signed with Newark on May 19, 1964. He recorded one reception for three yards for the Bears in 1964.

Kaimer finished the 1964 ACFL season with the Jersey City Giants. He caught 36 passes for 686 yards and seven touchdowns for the newly-renamed Jersey Jets during the 1965 season. He totaled 35 catches for 584 yards and four touchdowns in 1966.

Kaimer played for the Westchester Bulls of the ACFL in 1967 and scored one receiving touchdown.

Kaimer finished his career with the ACFL's Bridgeport Jets in 1968.

== Personal life ==
Kaimer later spent time as a racecar driver.
