= Roger Ellis (American football) =

American football player (1938–2008)

No. 56, 52, 64, 72
- Positions: Linebacker, center

Personal information
- Born: February 1, 1938; Boston, Massachusetts, U.S.
- Died: May 14, 2008 (aged 70); Brewer, Maine, U.S.
- Listed height: 6 ft 3 in (1.91 m)
- Listed weight: 233 lb (106 kg)

Career information
- High school: Westwood (Westwood, Massachusetts)
- College: Maine
- NFL draft: 1959: 14th round, 166th overall pick

Career history

Playing
- New York Titans/Jets (1960–1963); Portland Sea Hawks (1963); Montreal Alouettes (1963); Saskatchewan Roughriders (1964); Portland Sea Hawks (1964); Boston / New Bedford Sweepers (1964-1966); Hartford Charter Oaks (1966); Lowell Giants (1968)

Coaching
- New Bedford Sweepers (1966) Assistant coach

Career AFL statistics
- Games played: 43
- Games started: 23
- Interceptions: 1
- Stats at Pro Football Reference

Roger Calvin Ellis (February 1, 1938 – May 14, 2008) was an American football linebacker and center who played four seasons with the New York Titans of the American Football League (AFL). He played college football at the University of Maine for the Maine Black Bears football team.
