= Butch Songin =

American gridiron football player (1924–1976)

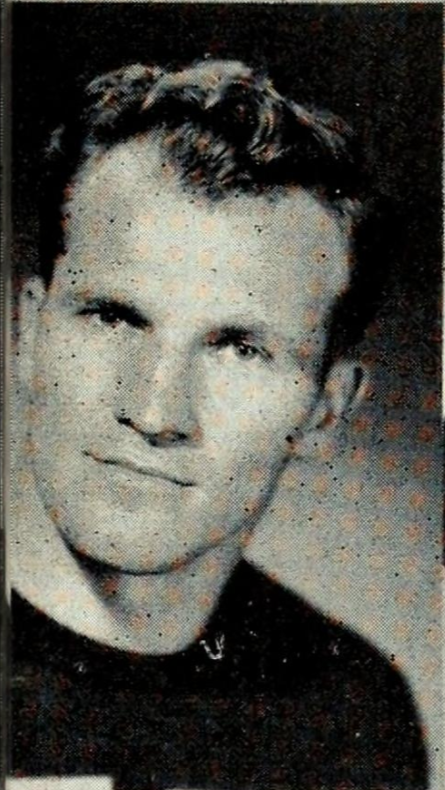
- Songin in 1949

No. 33, 95, 11, 25, 21
- Position: Quarterback

Personal information
- Born: May 11, 1924; Walpole, Massachusetts, U.S.
- Died: May 26, 1976 (aged 52); Foxboro, Massachusetts, U.S.
- Listed height: 6 ft 2 in (1.88 m)
- Listed weight: 190 lb (86 kg)

Career information
- High school: Walpole; The Newman School (Boston, Massachusetts)
- College: Boston College
- NFL draft: 1950: 19th round, 247th overall pick

Career history
- Erie Vets (1950); Hamilton Tiger-Cats (1953–1954); Boston Patriots (1960–1961); New York Titans (1962); Portland Sea Hawks (1962); Springfield Acorns (1963); New Bedford Sweepers (1964-1966); Hartford Charter Oaks (1966)

Awards and highlights
- 1949 Scanlan Award; Grey Cup champion (1953)

Career NFL statistics
- Passing attempts: 694
- Passing completions: 327
- Completion percentage: 47.1%
- TD–INT: 38–31
- Passing yards: 4,347
- Passer rating: 67.1
- Stats at Pro Football Reference

Edward F. "Butch" Songin (May 11, 1924 – May 12, 1976) was a quarterback for the Boston College Eagles, the Hamilton Tiger-Cats of the Canadian Rugby Union, and for the American Football League (AFL)'s Boston Patriots and the New York Titans. He was also an All-American defenseman for the BC Eagles ice hockey team.

== College career ==
From 1947 to 1949, Songin was the starting quarterback for the Boston College Eagles. He completed 192 of 385 passes for 2,534 yards, 30 touchdowns, and 24 interceptions, and ran 117 times for 164 yards.

Songin was a Hockey All-American for Boston College in 1948. He was a member of the 1948–1949 national championship team. He was captain of the 1949–50 squad and also won All-American. He was a founding member of the Pike's Peak Hockey Club. Today it is Boston College's oldest hockey booster organizations. Songin also played 1 game for the Worcester Warriors of the Eastern Hockey League during the 1954–55 season. His nephew Tom Songin played right wing for the Boston Bruins.

== Professional career ==
In 1950 Songin played three games for the Erie Vets of the AFL (formerly the American Association) before being sidelined by an injury, damaging the team's chances of a championship.

From 1953 to 1954, Songin played for the Hamilton Tiger-Cats of the Interprovincial Rugby Football Union, predecessor of the Canadian Football League. He won the Grey Cup in his rookie season in 1953.

In 1960 Songin signed with the Boston Patriots of the newly created American Football League. On September 9, 1960, Songin played in the first ever AFL game, against the Denver Broncos. In his first season with Boston he completed 187 of 392 passes for 2,476 yards, 22 touchdowns, and 15 interceptions. In 1961, he split starting duties with Babe Parilli. He completed 98 of 212 passes for 1,429 yards, 14 touchdowns, and 9 interceptions. In 1962, he was the opening day quarterback for the New York Titans, but was replaced by Lee Grosscup. He played in 7 games, completing 42 of 90 passes for 442 yards, 2 touchdowns, and 7 interceptions.

From 1962 to 1966, Songin played for several semi-pro football teams.

== AFL career statistics ==
Legend
**Bold**	Career high

Year	Team	Games			Passing									Rushing					Sacked		Fum
Year	Team	GP	GS	Record	Cmp	Att	Pct	Yds	Y/A	Lng	TD	Int	Rtg	Att	Yds	Y/A	Lng	TD	Sck	SckY	Fum
1960	BOS	**14**	**12**	**4–8**	**187**	**392**	**47.7**	**2,476**	6.3	**78**	**22**	**15**	70.9	**11**	**40**	3.6	**20**	**2**	**25**	**180**	3
1961	BOS	**14**	6	3–2–1	98	212	46.2	1,429	**6.7**	58	14	9	**73.0**	8	39	**4.9**	11	0	18	138	**4**
1962	NYT	7	2	1–1	42	90	46.7	442	4.9	64	2	7	36.4	4	11	2.8	10	0	12	94	0
Career		35	20	8–11–1	327	694	47.1	4,347	6.3	78	38	31	67.1	23	90	3.9	20	2	55	412	7

== Death ==
Songin died of cancer May 26, 1976 at his home in Foxboro, Massachusetts. He was 52 years old. At the time of his death, he was chief probation officer in the Wrentham District Court. He left his widow, Catherine E. (Rockett-Currivan); ex-wife Joyce Songin (nee Laverick), three daughters, a son, a stepson, a stepdaughter, three sisters and three brothers.

== Awards and honors ==
Award	Years
AHCA First Team All-American	1947–48, 1948–49
NCAA All-Tournament Second Team	1948, 1950
NCAA All-Tournament First Team	1949

== See also ==
- List of American Football League players
