= Thomas Stephens (American football) =

American football player (1935–2018)

No. 45, 44, 35
- Positions: Tight end, defensive back

Personal information
- Born: August 29, 1935; Galveston, Texas, U.S.
- Died: July 12, 2018 (aged 82); Naples, Florida, U.S.
- Listed height: 6 ft 2 in (1.88 m)
- Listed weight: 215 lb (98 kg)

Career information
- College: Syracuse (1955–1958)
- NFL draft: 1959: 11th round, 132nd overall pick

Career history

Playing
- Baltimore Colts (1959)*; Boston Patriots (1960–1964); Boston Steamrollers (1965); Lowell Giants (1966)
- * Offseason or practice squad member only

Coaching
- Boston Steamrollers (1965) Assistant coach; Lowell Giants (1966) Assistant coach

Awards and highlights
- Second-team All-Eastern (1958); Syracuse Orange No. 44 retired

Career AFL statistics
- Receptions: 41
- Receiving yards: 506
- Receiving touchdowns: 5
- Stats at Pro Football Reference

Thomas G. Stephens (August 29, 1935 – July 12, 2018) was an American professional football player who was a tight end for five seasons for the Boston Patriots of the American Football League (AFL).
