= Robert Brown (tight end) =

American football player (born 1943)

No. 41, 89, 36, 88
- Position: Tight end

Personal information
- Born: January 1, 1943 (age 83); Pace, Mississippi, U.S.
- Listed height: 6 ft 2 in (1.88 m)
- Listed weight: 225 lb (102 kg)

Career information
- High school: East Side (Cleveland, Mississippi)
- College: Alcorn A&M
- NFL draft: 1966: undrafted

Career history
- Montreal Beavers (1966); St. Louis Cardinals (1967–1970); → Virginia Sailors (1968); Minnesota Vikings (1971); New Orleans Saints (1972–1973); Birmingham Americans (1974); Birmingham Vulcans (1975)

Awards and highlights
- World Bowl champion (1974)
- Stats at Pro Football Reference

Robert Earl Brown (born January 1, 1943) is an American former professional football tight end who played five seasons in the National Football League (NFL) with the St. Louis Cardinals, Minnesota Vikings and New Orleans Saints. He played college football at Alcorn A&M. He was also a member of the Montreal Beavers of the Continental Football League (COFL), the Virginia Sailors of the Atlantic Coast Football League (ACFL), and the Birmingham Americans and Birmingham Vulcans of the World Football League (WFL).

== Early life and college ==
Robert Earl Brown was born on January 1, 1943, in Pace, Mississippi. He attended East Side High School in Cleveland, Mississippi.

Brown played college football for the Alcorn A&M Braves of Alcorn Agricultural and Mechanical College. He was on the freshman team in 1962 and was a three-year letterman from 1963 to 1965. He was inducted into the Alcorn State University Athletics Hall of Fame in 2005.

== Professional career ==
Brown played for the Montreal Beavers of the Continental Football League in 1966, catching 44 passes for 785 yards and six touchdowns while also rushing 15 times for 114 yards.

Brown spent time on the taxi squad of the St. Louis Cardinals of the National Football League in 1967. He then served a stint in the United States Army. He returned to the Cardinals' taxi squad in 1968. He also played for the Cardinals' farm team, the Virginia Sailors of the Atlantic Coast Football League, during the 1968 season. Brown played in 12 games for St. Louis during the 1969 season but did not record a catch. He appeared in all 14 games, starting one, in 1970 and did not catch a pass for the second straight year.

On September 13, 1971, Brown and Nate Wright were traded to the Minnesota Vikings for Mike McGill, Dale Hackbart, and an undisclosed draft pick. Brown played in eight games, starting four, for the Vikings in 1971, catching six passes for 141 yards. He also played in, and started, one game during the 1971 postseason.

On September 1, 1972, Brown was traded to the New Orleans Saints for two undisclosed draft picks. He played in all 14 games, starting five, during the 1972 season, recording 11 receptions for 175 yards and one touchdown. He appeared in five games, all starts, in 1973 and caught 11 passes for 132 yards before being placed on injured reserve. Brown was released by the Saints on August 30, 1974.

Brown signed with the Birmingham Americans of the World Football League (WFL) on September 17, 1974, during the middle of the season. He made 16 catches for 266 yards during the 1974 season. The Americans finished the year with a 15–5 record and advanced to the World Bowl, where they beat the Florida Blazers by a score of 22–21. However, the Americans folded after the season.

Brown signed with the new Birmingham Vulcans for the 1975 WFL season. He caught nine passes for 172 yards in 1975. The Vulcans had a 9–3 record before the WFL folded during the middle of the season.

Brown was also a short-yardage blocker and special teams player during his NFL career.
