= Ken Webb (American football) =

American football player (1935–2003)

No. 34
- Positions: Halfback, fullback

Personal information
- Born: August 15, 1935; Albany, Georgia, U.S.
- Died: September 20, 2003 (aged 68); Carthage, Texas, U.S.
- Listed height: 5 ft 11 in (1.80 m)
- Listed weight: 207 lb (94 kg)

Career information
- High school: Decatur (Decatur, Georgia)
- College: Presbyterian
- NFL draft: 1958: 14th round, 169th overall pick

Career history
- Detroit Lions (1958–1962); Cleveland Browns (1963); Atlanta Spartans (1964); Washington Redskins (1965)*; Philadelphia Bulldogs (1965)
- * Offseason or practice squad member only
- Stats at Pro Football Reference

Kenneth Lee Webb (August 15, 1935 – September 20, 2003) was an American professional football running back who played in the National Football League (NFL) with the Detroit Lions and Cleveland Browns. He played college football for the Presbyterian Blue Hose and was selected by the Lions in the 14th round of the 1958 NFL draft.

== Early life ==
Kenneth Lee Webb was born on August 15, 1935, in Albany, Georgia. He attended Decatur High School in Decatur, Georgia.

Webb played college football for the Presbyterian Blue Hose from 1954 to 1957.

== Professional career ==
Webb was selected by the Detroit Lions in the 14th round, with the 169th overall pick, of the 1958 NFL draft. He signed with the team on July 5, 1958. He played in 61 games, starting 16, for the Lions from 1958 to 1962, totaling 252 carries for 833 yards and eight touchdowns, 44 receptions for 481 yards and one touchdown, and 26 kick returns for 549 yards. Webb led the team in kick return yards during the 1959 season with 352.

On May 2, 1963, after defensive tackle Alex Karras was suspended for gambling, the Lions traded Webb to the Cleveland Browns for defensive tackle Floyd Peters. Webb appeared in 12 games, starting two, for the Browns in 1963, rushing 12 times for 58 yards while also catching two passes for two yards. He was released on September 10, 1964.

Webb played for the Atlanta Spartans of the Atlantic Coast Football League during the 1964 season, recording 126 rushing attempts for 625 yards and five touchdowns and one receiving touchdown.

Webb signed with the Washington Redskins on June 17, 1965. He was released on August 26, 1965.

Webb played for the Philadelphia Bulldogs of the Continental Football League in 1965, totaling 65 carries for 223 yards and four touchdowns, 13 catches for 156 yards and two touchdowns, and two kickoff returns for 31 yards.

== Personal life ==
After his NFL career, Webb worked for General Motors until retiring in 1986. He died on September 20, 2003, in Carthage, Texas.
