= Solomon Brannan =

American football player (born 1942)

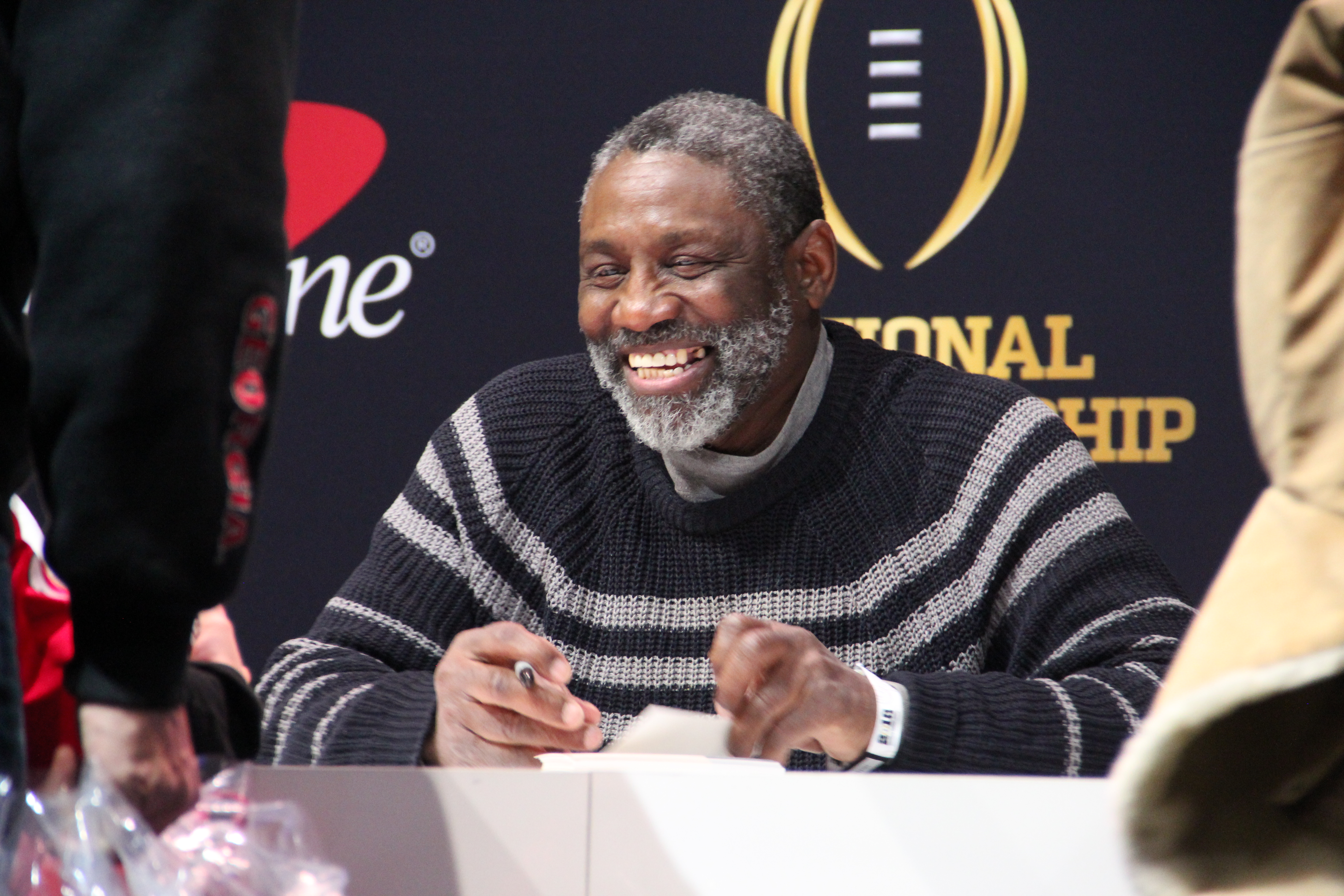
- Brannan in 2018

No. 13, 38, 47, 20, 34
- Position: Defensive back

Personal information
- Born: September 5, 1942 (age 84); Savannah, Georgia, U.S.
- Listed height: 6 ft 1 in (1.85 m)
- Listed weight: 188 lb (85 kg)

Career information
- High school: Tompkins (Savannah)
- College: Morris Brown (1960–1963)
- NFL draft: 1964: undrafted

Career history
- Kansas City Chiefs (1964)*; Springfield Acorns (1964); Kansas City Chiefs (1965–1966); New York Jets (1967); Cincinnati Bengals (1968)*; Michigan Arrows (1968); Detroit Lions (1970)*; Miami Dolphins (1970)*; Jacksonville Sharks (1974)
- * Offseason or practice squad member only

Awards and highlights
- AFL champion (1966)
- Stats at Pro Football Reference

Solomon Embra Brannan (born September 5, 1942) is an American former professional football defensive back who played three seasons in the American Football League (AFL) with the Kansas City Chiefs and New York Jets. He played college football at Morris Brown College. Brannan also played for the Springfield Acorns of the Atlantic Coast Football League, the Michigan Arrows of the Continental Football League, and the Jacksonville Sharks of the World Football League (WFL). He was a member of the Chiefs team that won the 1966 AFL championship.

== Early life and college ==
Solomon Embra Brannan was born on September 5, 1942, in Savannah, Georgia. He attended Tompkins High School in Savannah.

Brannan was a member of the Morris Brown Wolverines of Morris Brown College from 1960 to 1963.

== Professional career ==
Brannan signed with the Kansas City Chiefs of the American Football League (AFL) after going undrafted in the 1964 AFL draft. He was released on September 7, 1964.

Brannan played in 11 games for the Springfield Acorns of the Atlantic Coast Football League in 1964, totaling six interceptions for 257 yards and two touchdowns, ten receptions for 93 yards and two touchdowns, nine kickoff returns for 193 yards, and four punt returns for 16 yards.

Brannan signed with the Chiefs again in 1965. He was placed on injured reserve on September 7, 1965, but was later activated. He played in ten games for the Chiefs during the 1965 season, returning nine kicks for 226 yards and five punts for ten yards while also fumbling twice. He was released on August 30, 1966, but later signed to the team's taxi squad. Brannan was promoted to the active roster on October 8, 1966. He appeared in three games in 1966 and returned one kick for 24 yards. On January 1, 1967, the Chiefs beat the Buffalo Bills in the 1966 AFL Championship Game by a score of 31–7.

On June 30, 1967, it was reported that Brannan had been traded to the New York Jets for Mike Hudock. Brannan played in 12 games, starting three, for the Jets during the 1967 season, recording two fumble recoveries for ten yards and nine kick returns for 204 yards.

In January 1968, Brannan was selected by the Cincinnati Bengals of the AFL in an expansion draft. He was released on August 10, 1968.

Brannan played for the Michigan Arrows of the Continental Football League in 1968, totaling five interceptions for 98 yards, two receptions for 25 yards, and one kickoff return for 19 yards.

Brannan signed with the Detroit Lions in 1970 but was later released and signed by the Miami Dolphins. He was released by the Dolphins on August 5, 1970.

Brannan played for the Jacksonville Sharks of the upstart World Football League in 1974, accumulating two interceptions for 39 yards, one punt return for 42 yards, and one kickoff return for 25 yards.

== Post-playing career ==
Brannan was later an assistant coach at Morehouse College and the head coach at Morris Brown College. He was inducted into the Greater Savannah Athletic Hall of Fame in 2000.
