= King Corcoran =

American football player (1943–2009)

No. 9, 15
- Position: Quarterback

Personal information
- Born: July 6, 1943; Jersey City, New Jersey
- Died: June 19, 2009 (aged 65); Takoma Park, Maryland
- Listed height: 6 ft 0 in (1.83 m)
- Listed weight: 200 lb (91 kg)

Career information
- College: Maryland

Career history
- 1966–1967: Denver Broncos*
- 1967: Waterbury Orbits
- 1968: Lowell Giants
- 1968: Boston Patriots
- 1969: Pottstown Firebirds
- 1970: Pennsylvania Firebirds
- 1971: Philadelphia Eagles*
- 1971: Norfolk Neptunes
- 1972: Montreal Alouettes*
- 1972: Chambersburg Cardinals
- 1973: Flint Sabres
- 1974–1975: Philadelphia Bell
- * Offseason or practice squad member only
- Stats at Pro Football Reference

James Sean Patrick "King" Corcoran (July 6, 1943 – June 19, 2009) was an American football quarterback who had a ten-year career as a journeyman in the Atlantic Coast Football League, Seaboard Football League, Midwest Football League, World Football League, and briefly in the American Football League. Corcoran played college football, mostly as a back-up, for the Maryland Terrapins. He gained notoriety for his flamboyant dress and playboy lifestyle, which earned him the reputation of being a "poor man's Joe Namath".

== Early life and college ==
Corcoran was born on July 6, 1943, in Jersey City, New Jersey, to an Irish Catholic family. His father, a truck driver, died in 1966, after which Corcoran never saw his mother, who died in 2008. At the age of 15, he was on his own; with his younger brother Raymond, they lived out their adolescence in a room at the YMCA. According to Corcoran, he gained the nickname "King" as a high school senior. A driving rainstorm hit during the first half of an important game, but when it let up at half time, Corcoran appeared wearing a clean uniform and sunglasses and the manager holding his helmet. Someone from the crowd yelled, "Hail to the King," and a melee erupted. Corcoran said, "I was ink now, I was someone . . . I went from a nothing quarterback to second-string all-state in two weeks. It was the turning point in my life." According to The Washington Times, Corcoran was recruited by Notre Dame, Miami, and Maryland. Corcoran claimed students at Notre Dame did not party and those at Miami did so too much. He chose to attend Maryland because he felt it offered a balance between a social life and the opportunity to play football.

He attended the University of Maryland starting in 1961. He played as a back-up quarterback behind Dick Shiner and Alan Pastrana, but rarely started because of disagreements with the coaching staff. An injury benched Corcoran for the 1963 season. Corcoran's greatest college football accomplishment was leading Maryland's 1961 freshman team to an undefeated season, including a 29–27 victory over Navy, led by future Pro Football Hall of Famer Roger Staubach. In his later life, Corcoran claimed to have led Maryland to a 27–22 victory over the Navy varsity team in 1964; but he did not actually play in that game. At Maryland, Corcoran first developed his reputation for brashness, and he referred to himself as "The King". The Washington Post described him as such:

[H]e was flamboyant, brash and utterly unforgettable. He was a showman, an unapologetic playboy, an egomaniacal self-promoter who traveled with his own PR agent. And, not least of all, he was a lady-killer on an epic scale. Not for nothing was he called the "poor man's Joe Namath," after the Hall of Fame New York Jets quarterback and notorious skirt chaser.

== Professional career ==
In 1966 and 1967, he spent some time in camp with the American Football League's Denver Broncos, but was ultimately cut from the team. According to The Washington Post, he was allegedly caught by the coach in bed with six women. Corcoran then signed with the Waterbury Orbits of the Atlantic Coast Football League. In 1967, Corcoran spent time on the AFL New York Jets taxi squad, where he was first described as a "poor man's Joe Namath". After being cut by the Jets, Corcoran signed with the Lowell Giants, a farm team of the Boston Patriots. In 1968, he got his first taste of big-time football when he spent two games with the parent club. (He appeared in two games for the Patriots, completing 3-of-3 passes for 33 yards vs the Miami Dolphins and going 0-4 and two interceptions vs the Houston Oilers.)

In 1969, Corcoran was back in the minors, signing a hefty three-year, $125,000 contract with the Pottstown Firebirds, a farm club of the Philadelphia Eagles. Corcoran would lead the Firebirds to back to back championships in 1969 and 1970, but the club folded after the 1970 season. Given another chance at the NFL, he moved up to the Eagles, but was released during the 1971 pre-season. Corcoran then signed with the Norfolk Neptunes, leading them to an ACFL title, his third straight minor-league championship. In 1972, Corcoran headed north to play with Montreal Alouettes of the Canadian Football League, but quit the team after refusing to serve as its third-string quarterback; instead, he moved to the Chambersburg Cardinals of the Seaboard Football League. He was paid $600 per game by the Cardinals in 1972. He signed with the Flint Sabres of the Midwest Football League in July 1973. The Sabres released him in the middle of the season due to his ignoring instructions from the head coach, but was quickly brought back.

In 1974, he signed with the Philadelphia Bell of the newly formed World Football League. He led the WFL in passing touchdowns in the league's only full season. Corcoran completed 280 of 545 passes for 3,531 yards and 31 touchdowns. He also threw 24 interceptions and suffered 20 sacks.

After the WFL folded, Corcoran retired from professional football in 1975 and became involved in real estate. In the 1980s, he took up polo, and despite having had no prior experience with horses, was an adequate amateur competitor. He married and had children, but they eventually moved to Florida without him. Corcoran later spent some time in Las Vegas as a singer and performed with Engelbert Humperdinck. Some of Corcoran's business dealings were of questionable legality, and he had been embroiled in legal troubles since the 1970s. He was convicted of fraud for selling property he did not own, and in 1997, Corcoran spent six months in a federal prison for tax evasion. He moved frequently and spent his last years in various locations in the Baltimore-Washington metropolitan area. At the time of his death, he was living at a friend's house in Takoma Park, Maryland. He died of cardiac arrest on June 19, 2009, at Washington Adventist Hospital in Takoma Park.

Corcoran was inducted into the American Football Association's Semi Pro Football Hall of Fame in 1982.
