= Riley Morris =

American football player (1934–1997)

No. 73, 55, 92, 81
- Positions: Linebacker, defensive end

Personal information
- Born: March 22, 1934 or 1935 (Note: Pro-Football-Reference.com and Pro Football Archives list 1934 and 1935, respectively.); Jacksonville, Florida, U.S.
- Died: April 5, 1997 (aged 62 or 63)
- Listed height: 6 ft 2 in (1.88 m)
- Listed weight: 230 lb (104 kg)

Career information
- High school: Stanton (Jacksonville)
- College: Florida A&M (1954–1957)
- NFL draft: 1958: undrafted

Career history
- Los Angeles Chargers (1960)*; Oakland Raiders (1960–1962); Boston Patriots (1964)*; Boston / New Bedford Sweepers (1964–1966); Waterbury Orbits (1967); Quincy Giants (1969)
- * Offseason or practice squad member only

Awards and highlights
- AFL sacks co-leader (1960); 2× ACFL champion (1964, 1965); First-team All-ACFL (1964); Black college national champion (1957); Third-team All-SIAC (1956)

Career AFL statistics
- Sacks: 15
- Interceptions: 3
- Interception yards: 79
- Defensive touchdowns: 1
- Stats at Pro Football Reference

Riley D. Morris (March 22, 1934 or 1935 – April 5, 1997) was an American professional football linebacker and defensive end who played three seasons in the American Football League (AFL) for the Oakland Raiders and five seasons in the Atlantic Coast Football League (ACFL) for the Boston / New Bedford Sweepers, Waterbury Orbits and Quincy Giants. He played college football for the Florida A&M Rattlers.

== Early life and education ==
Morris was born in either 1934 or 1935 in Jacksonville, Florida. He attended Stanton Preparatory School there and graduated in c. 1954. Morris joined Florida A&M University after graduating from Stanton Prep and as a freshman was described as having "tremendous possibilities" by coach Hansel Tookes. As a sophomore, he earned a starting position and was reported by the Tallahassee Democrat as a "bright prospect." As a junior in 1956, Morris was named third-team All-Southern Intercollegiate Athletic Conference (SIAC).

In September 1957, The Pittsburgh Courier reported that Morris is "looked upon by some as one of the best men at his position in the country." He returned as Florida A&M starting tackle for his senior year. The Alabama Tribune listed him as a potential All-American candidate. The 1957 Florida A&M football team compiled an undefeated 9–0 record and were named black college national champions.

== Professional career ==
Despite having been out of the sport for the prior two seasons, Morris was signed by the Los Angeles Chargers of the American Football League (AFL) in 1960. When asked "the best pro prospect among the unheralded gridders [players] who reported to camp," Coach Sid Gillman named Morris. The Tallahassee Democrat reported that he was "touted as the fastest man in camp" and made the first seven tackles in a practice game. He was waived on September 7, being one of the final roster cuts.

The Los Angeles Times reported that Morris "will be back to haunt the Chargers," as he was immediately claimed by the rival Oakland Raiders after being waived by Los Angeles. On September 19, he was promoted to the Raiders active roster. The Oakland Tribune reported that he "has been a big surprise to the Raiders ... [he] has improved in every game as a corner linebacker." Coach Eddie Erdelatz said Morris "just loves to knock people down on that field."

Morris finished the season having played in between twelve and fourteen games, twelve as a starter. With ten quarterback sacks, Morris placed first in the league, tied with Mel Branch. The 1960 Oakland Raiders compiled a record of 6–8, third place in the AFL Western Division.

Morris returned as Raiders starting linebacker in 1961. In a week fourteen game against the Boston Patriots, he picked off a Babe Parilli pass and returned it 35 yards for his first career touchdown. Morris finished the season with fourteen games played, all as a starter, and three interceptions returned for 79 yards and one touchdown. He also made three sacks, as the Raiders finished with a record of 2–12.

In May 1962, Morris' position was changed from linebacker to defensive end. He missed most of the season due to an injury, but was re-activated for the final four games of the season. Shortly after returning from injury, Morris "provided the Raiders with their best pass rush in weeks" against the San Diego Chargers. The Raiders finished with a record of 1–13, as Morris appeared in four games. He was waived by the Raiders in July 1963.

In July 1964, Morris was signed by the Boston Patriots. He was waived in August as part of roster cuts. He later joined the Boston Sweepers in the Atlantic Coast Football League (ACFL). Morris helped the Sweepers compile a record of 11–3 en route to the league championship. He scored two touchdowns that year. After the season ended, he was named a first-team All-ACFL selection. Morris returned to the Sweepers (renamed the New Bedford Sweepers) in 1965 and helped them win their second consecutive league title. He returned for a third season with the Sweepers in 1966.

After the Sweepers folded, Morris joined the Waterbury Orbits in 1967. After spending the following season out of football, Morris played a final season with the Quincy Giants in 1969.

Morris was nicknamed "The Rattler" by his Raiders teammates for his college (whose sports teams are called the Rattlers) and for his "quick strikes" on the football field.

== Later life and death ==
Morris later was employed at Polaroid in Norwood, Massachusetts. He also was a golfer.

Morris died on April 5, 1997.
