= Art DeCarlo =

American football player (1931–2013)

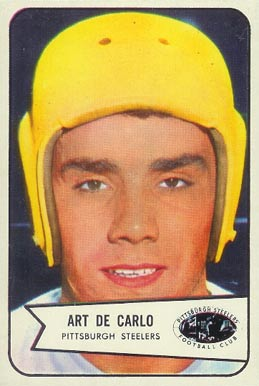
- DeCarlo on a 1954 Bowman football card

No. 26, 27, 23, 21
- Positions: Defensive back, end

Personal information
- Born: March 23, 1931; Youngstown, Ohio, U.S.
- Died: December 21, 2013 (aged 82); Birmingham, Alabama, U.S.
- Listed height: 6 ft 2 in (1.88 m)
- Listed weight: 196 lb (89 kg)

Career information
- High school: East (Youngstown)
- College: Georgia (1949–1952)
- NFL draft: 1953: 6th round, 66th overall pick

Career history

Playing
- Pittsburgh Steelers (1953); Washington Redskins (1956–1957); Baltimore Colts (1957-1960)

Coaching
- Harrisburg Capitols (1963–1964) Head coach; Baltimore Broncos (1965) Assistant coach

Awards and highlights
- 2× NFL champion (1958, 1959)

Career NFL statistics
- Receptions: 9
- Receiving yards: 126
- Interceptions: 7
- Stats at Pro Football Reference

Arthur Anthony DeCarlo, Jr. (March 23, 1931 – December 28, 2013) was an American professional football defensive back and end in the National Football League (NFL). He played a total of six seasons for the Pittsburgh Steelers, Washington Redskins, and Baltimore Colts.

A former collegian at the University of Georgia, DeCarlo was originally drafted in the sixth round of the 1953 NFL draft by the Chicago Bears.

DeCarlo would win two World Championships in 1958 and 1959 as a member of the Colts. He retired after the 1960 season.

Following his death from complications of heart surgery in 2013, DeCarlo's family made his brain available as part of a pioneering study of the prevalence of chronic traumatic encephalopathy (CTE) in former professional football players. DeCarlo's brain was found to be positive for the degenerative disease.

== Biography ==
=== Early life ===
Art DeCarlo was born March 23, 1931, in Youngstown, Ohio. His father, Antonio DeCarlo, was a contractor.

His parents died when he was still a minor and he was raised by an older brother, working in a steel mill the summer after he graduated from high school.

=== College career ===
An athlete from his high school years, DeCarlo had offers to attend various colleges to play football. A classmate encouraged him to travel to Athens, Georgia, to try out for the Bulldogs, however, and helped buy a one-way ticket.

Always a versatile athlete, DeCarlo played five different positions for the Bulldogs, including end and halfback.

DeCarlo graduated from Georgia in 1952. He was recognized as the Most Valuable Defensive Player in the 1952 Blue-Gray College All-Star game.

=== Professional career ===
DeCarlo was selected in January 1953 in the sixth round of the 1953 NFL draft (66th overall) by George Halas and the Chicago Bears.

DeCarlo was immediately shipped off to the Pittsburgh Steelers ahead of the 1953 NFL season. He had an extremely productive rookie year as a Pittsburgh defensive back, picking off 5 passes, which generated 83 yards in interception returns.

His career was interrupted when he was drafted into the US Army, causing him to miss the entirety of the 1954 and 1955 NFL seasons. He was stationed at Aberdeen Proving Ground in Maryland and Fort Belvoir in Virginia during his 21 months of prescribed military service.

While he was still in the military, Pittsburgh traded the contract of DeCarlo and his teammate Leo Elter to the Washington Redskins for lineman Dick Modzelewski. DeCarlo was discharged in time to play defensive back for Washington in 1956.

DeCarlo entered the 1957 NFL season with the Redskins but was cut by the team early in the season, ostensibly over a blown pass coverage. In October he was signed by head coach Weeb Ewbank and the Colts to fill a hole in the roster resulting from a facial injury to defensive back Carl Taseff and his subsequent relegation to the injured reserve list.

Ewbank noted that DeCarlo offered the team skills that would provide extra depth at several positions. Ewbank cited DeCarlo's speed, tackling ability, and ability to break up passes as a defensive back on the one hand — but also his capability to serve as an effective pass receiver on the offensive side of the ball.

DeCarlo saw action in 6 games for the Colts in 1957, starting in 4 at defensive left halfback. He intercepted one ball during the year. It would be his last interception in the NFL.

For the 1958 Colts season, Art DeCarlo was used as a utility player — playing a reserve role in the defensive backfield, filling in as needed as an offensive end, and playing on the special teams on both punts and kickoffs.

Powered by a pass-driven offense led by Hall of Fame quarterback Johnny Unitas, the Colts would win the first of two back-to-back World Championships in 1958, beating the New York Giants in a contest remembered in legend as "the greatest game ever played."

The Colts would win the World Championship again in 1959, again emerging victorious over Y. A. Tittle, Frank Gifford, and the New York Giants — this time by a more convincing 31–16 score.

In 1960, DeCarlo continued to play special teams and filled in as a reserve at tight end behind Colts starter Jim Mutscheller. DeCarlo started 3 games and saw action in 9, blocking satisfactorily and gathering in 8 completions for 116 yards.

The 30-year old DeCarlo was back in training camp ahead of the 1961 season but he suffered a knee injury in practice on August 9 when playing defensive back and attempting to break up a pass to Colts star Lenny Moore. He was able to battle back to take some defensive reps on August 24 but was unable to go in the next preseason game. He was not successful attempting to play through the damage in his next effort, however, with his knee buckling at practice on August 29, forcing what would be career-ending surgery.

=== Later life ===
After retiring from the NFL DeCarlo tried his hand at coaching football, accepting a head coaching position for the Harrisburg Capitols, a semi-pro team in the Atlantic Coast Professional Football League (ACPFL). He also coached football at Loyola Blakefield High School in Towson, Maryland.

He became a general contractor and constructed a number of miniature golf courses. He also opened a restaurant called DeCarlo's Beef and Beer.

DeCarlo also worked as national sales manager for Panasonic, retiring from that job at the end of the 1980s.

In his retirement from business he played golf and wrote a novel called Fumbled Kidnap.

As he aged he increasingly suffered from memory loss and what was diagnosed as physical trauma-induced dementia.

=== Death and legacy ===
DeCarlo died on December 28, 2013, in Birmingham, Alabama, from complications of heart surgery.

Postmortem, DeCarlo was diagnosed with chronic traumatic encephalopathy. He was one of at least 345 NFL players diagnosed after death with this disease, which is caused by repeated blows to the head.

Teammate Jim Mutscheller recalled at the time of his death: "He was a pass receiver and a defensive back and he played both positions very well. He was a good friend of mine and of Art Donovan, too. He and our families spent a lot of time together."
