= Curtis Crockett =

American football player and coach (1940–2003)

Biographical details
- Born: October 18, 1940; McDonough, Georgia, U.S.
- Died: February 1, 2003 (aged 62); Atlanta, Georgia, U.S.

Playing career

Football
- c. 1960: Clark Atlanta
- 1965: Baltimore Broncos

Basketball
- c. 1960: Clark Atlanta

Track and field
- c. 1960: Clark Atlanta
- Positions: Defensive end (football); Discus, shot put (track and field)

Coaching career (HC unless noted)
- 1963–1999: Clark Atlanta (assistant)
- 1999–2001: Clark Atlanta

Head coaching record
- Overall: 8–17

Curtis Crockett (October 18, 1940 – February 1, 2003) was an American football player and coach. He served as the head football coach at Clark Atlanta University from 1999 to 2001, compiling a record of 8–17. Crockett was appointed interim head coach four games into the 1999 season when head coach Elmer Mixon resigned after an 0–4 start. He resigned eight games into the 2001 season after leading the team to 1–7 record. Clark Atlanta's athletic director Brenda Edmond gave Crockett the option of being fired or resigning.

Crockett played for one season for the Baltimore Broncos of the Atlantic Coast Football League. He died of cancer on February 1, 2003, at Crawford Long Hospital in Atlanta, Georgia.

== Head coaching record ==
Year	Team	Overall	Conference	Standing	Bowl/playoffs
Clark Atlanta Panthers (Southern Intercollegiate Athletic Conference) (1999–2001)
1999	Clark Atlanta	3–4 (Note: Elmer Mixon served as the head coach for the first four games of the season before resigning. Crockett was appointed interim head coach and led the team for the final seven games. Clark Atlanta finished the year with an overall record of 3–7 and a conference mark of 1–5.)	1–3	T–7th	
2000	Clark Atlanta	4–6	3–4	T–4th	
2001	Clark Atlanta	1–7 (Note: Crockett served as the head coach for the first eight games of the season before resigning. Kevin Gray was appointed interim head coach and led the team for the final three games. Clark Atlanta finished the year with an overall record of 1–10 and a conference mark of 1–6, tying for seventh place.)	1–5		
Clark Atlanta:		8–17	5–12		
Total:		8–17			
