= Paul Zimmerman (sportswriter) =

American sportswriter (1932–2018)

Paul Lionel Zimmerman (October 23, 1932 – November 1, 2018), known to readers as "Dr. Z", was an American football sportswriter and former player who wrote for the weekly magazine Sports Illustrated, as well as the magazine's website, SI.com. He is sometimes confused with Paul B. Zimmerman, a sportswriter who covered football for the Los Angeles Times from 1932 to 1968.

== Biography ==
=== Early life ===
Zimmerman was born in Philadelphia, Pennsylvania, in 1932 to Charles S. Zimmerman and Rose Zimmerman, and moved to New York in elementary school.

=== Playing career ===
Zimmerman graduated from Horace Mann School in the Bronx before becoming a college football player at Stanford and Columbia University, where he wrote for the Columbia Daily Spectator. An offensive lineman, he was a member of a United States Army football team while stationed in Germany, and later played minor-league football in 1963 for the Westchester Crusaders of the Atlantic Coast Football League. Zimmerman was a founder member and player for the rugby union Columbia Old Blues in the 1960s.

=== Early journalism career ===
Zimmerman began his formal journalism career at the New York Journal-American and the New York World-Telegram and Sun before moving on to become a regular at the New York Post in 1966. In addition to football, Zimmerman covered three Olympic Games for the Post, including the hostage crisis at the 1972 Summer Games in Munich, Germany.

Zimmerman also wrote a regular wine column for the Post, and his wine opinions are often referenced in his weekly mailbag, with football fans adding wine queries to their football questions or comments.

=== Sports Illustrated ===
In 1979, Zimmerman moved to Sports Illustrated, where he wrote a weekly column and game predictions, and awarded the magazine's yearly All-Pros until his stroke. Zimmerman was best known for NFL picks published every week during the NFL season. He was notorious for hedging his bets. For instance, he would 'pick the Cowboys—as long as they can stop the run.'

Since the mid-1990s, Zimmerman was a frequent contributor to the Sports Illustrated website. Zimmerman provided the site with a weekly column - "Power Rankings" - of his estimations of the relative strengths of each NFL team, as well as a reader mailbag feature, in addition to his other contributions to the magazine.

Zimmerman's method of football analysis was a comprehensive one. His charts included both subjective opinions on the players and gameplay, as well as objective statistical information. At any point afterward, he could then give detailed analysis of the players, teams, and games that he charted, tracking who plays well against whom, which players are improving or declining, which superstars are overhyped, and which underrated players to "plug" in his writings.

Zimmerman also answered a weekly on-line mailbag. He wrote in a stream of consciousness style rather than a simple question-and-answer, liberally sprinkling in tidbits of football history, pieces of popular culture, quotations, admittedly bad jokes and puns, rants, and wine advice. He also frequently attributed a running commentary to his wife Linda, "the Flaming Redhead".

Annually, Zimmerman rated the performance of television NFL sportscasters, criticizing those announcers who did little more than hype the stars while making inane comments on the game, ignoring the strategy or play of the game, or generally making mistakes in their commentaries. Zimmerman also praised the sportscasters who provided meaningful, intelligent commentary for football fans. Zimmerman himself briefly worked as an analyst for NBC's NFL coverage in 1985.

While covering the NFL draft for ESPN in the 1980s, Zimmerman was asked what the NFL player of the 1990s would be like. Zimmerman responded, controversially, "The player of the '90s will be so sophisticated that he'll be able to pass any steroid test they come up with," ending his television career.

Zimmerman had a remarkable year of NFL predictions in 1986. Before the season, he accurately predicted all six division winners and all four wild-card teams, and he also nailed the Super Bowl result, the Giants over the Broncos.

In January 2008, Zimmerman correctly predicted that the New York Giants (an overwhelming underdog) would win Super Bowl XLII over the previously undefeated New England Patriots.

Zimmerman served on the 44-member Pro Football Hall of Fame selection committee. He used to be a member of the Hall's smaller Senior Committee, a position that Zimmerman resigned in protest over the committee's repeated rejection of players he deemed worthy candidates.

=== Influences ===
Zimmerman's style showed similarities to New Journalism, and this influence was especially evident in his web entries. Zimmerman named Jimmy Cannon as one of the sports writers he most admired. Zimmerman described George Orwell as his "literary idol," and his writing shows some thematic similarities with that of the late novelist. In the 1980s, Zimmerman, a self-described "round-head", was the last writer at Sports Illustrated allowed to continue using a typewriter and fax to file his stories when the rest of the writers had started using computers.

=== Books ===
Zimmerman wrote the football tome The Thinking Man's Guide to Pro Football (Dutton; revised edition, 1970) and his 1984 update of that book, The New Thinking Man's Guide to Pro Football (Simon & Schuster). His other books include Football Lingo (WW Norton 1967, with Zander Hollander); The Linebackers (a 1972 short text for Scholastic Press); The Last Season of Weeb Ewbank (Farrar, Straus and Giroux 1974); and Duane Thomas and the Fall of America's Team (Warner Books 1988; credited to Thomas and Zimmerman, it contains diary entries by Thomas but otherwise the text is that of Zimmerman). Zimmerman's memoir "Dr. Z: The Lost Memoirs of an Irreverent Football Writer" (Triumph Books) was released in September 2017, with stories compiled and edited by Peter King of Sports Illustrated's MMQB site.

== Personal life and death ==
He was married to Dr. Kate Hart for 20 years. They had two children, Sarah and Michael. Zimmerman married Linda Bailey in 1997.

Zimmerman suffered a stroke on November 22, 2008, which, combined with two later strokes, left him unable to walk or write and only able to speak a few words (yes, no and when); after the stroke, his ability to communicate was extremely limited, only able to make rough gestures. He was still believed to be of sound mind through what he could communicate as of 2013. He died November 1, 2018, from complications of the strokes.

== Legacy ==
In 2018, Sport Illustrated published "Dr. Z’s Ultimate Legacy," which called Dr. Z a "master of analysis."
