= New England Colonials =

Defunct American football team

- Founded: 1973
- Folded: 1974
- League: Atlantic Coast Football League
- Based in: Foxboro, Massachusetts
- Arena: Schaefer Stadium
- Championships: 1 (1973)

The New England Colonials were a minor league American football team based in Foxboro, Massachusetts. They played one season in the Atlantic Coast Football League (ACFL) in 1973 and played their home games at Schaefer Stadium which it shared with the New England Patriots.

The Colonials won the 1973 ACFL championship on November 23, 1973, in a 41–17 win over the Bridgeport Jets at John F. Kennedy Stadium in Bridgeport, Connecticut.
