= Mel Meeks =

American football player

Mel Meeks (born c. 1935) was a professional American football running back.

== Career ==
A native of Muskogee, Oklahoma, Meeks never played college football and began his professional career relatively late in life after playing for a team on the Westover Air Reserve Base during his time in the United States Air Force. He spent his entire career in minor leagues, beginning his career with the Holyoke Merchants/Knights before signing on with the Springfield Acorns of the Atlantic Coast Football League in 1963. He played two years there, including the 1964 season when he rushed for a league-record 1,460 yards. He then moved back to Holyoke, joining the now-renamed Bombers as they joined the ACFL. In 1966, Meeks moved to Hartford, Connecticut and played for the Hartford Charter Oaks of the Continental Football League. When the Charter Oaks disbanded in 1967, he remained in Connecticut and became a charter member of its replacement, the Hartford Knights of the ACFL. 1968 would prove to be another high point for Meeks's career; as part of a tandem with fullback Marv Hubbard (who would later go on to a three-time Pro Bowl career with the Oakland Raiders), the two would finish first and second in league rushing yardage as the Knights went onto that year's league championship. Meeks would continue to play minor professional football until 1970.

Meeks was a power runner who amassed 4,198 yards over the course of his six seasons in the ACFL and an additional 512 yards with the Charter Oaks. There was much speculation as to why Meeks never made it to the National Football League or American Football League, even as the existence of the latter league had expanded the number of opportunities for professional players (at least one contemporary report suggests he did have a preseason stint with the Minnesota Vikings, but he never made that team or any other's regular season roster). Most commonly cited are his relatively old age at the peak of his success, a perceived lack of quickness, and his lack of college football experience; some unnamed teammates also alleged Meeks, who was black, was the victim of racism, and his generally modest personality may have prevented him from fully promoting his career.

== Personal life ==
Meeks was married and had three children, one by birth and two through adoption. His biological son and one of his adopted sons shared the same name (Richard) and age (both were born in 1957).
