= Bill Robinson (American football) =

American football player (1928–2016)

No. 41, 88, 46
- Position: Halfback

Personal information
- Born: September 29, 1929; Pittsburgh, Pennsylvania, U.S.
- Died: March 31, 2016 (aged 87); New Rochelle, New York, U.S.
- Listed height: 6 ft 0 in (1.83 m)
- Listed weight: 195 lb (88 kg)

Career information
- College: Lincoln
- NFL draft: 1952: 25th round, 294th overall pick

Career history
- Green Bay Packers (1952); Winnipeg Blue Bombers (1955); New York Titans (1960); Westchester Crusaders (1963-1964)

Career NFL/AFL statistics
- Rushing yards: 4
- Rushing average: 1.3
- Return yards: 49
- Stats at Pro Football Reference

William Andrew Robinson (September 29, 1928 – March 31, 2016) was a halfback in the National Football League (NFL). He was drafted in the twenty-fifth round of the 1952 NFL draft by the Pittsburgh Steelers and played that season with the Green Bay Packers. Later he was a member of the New York Titans during the 1960 American Football League season. He died in 2016.
