= Howard S. Vandersea =

American football player and coach (born 1941)

Biographical details
- Born: September 12, 1941; Whitinsville, Massachusetts, U.S.
- Died: December 29, 2022; Boston, Massachusetts, U.S.
- Education: Bates College

Playing career
- 1959–1962: Bates
- 1963: Portland Sea Hawks
- 1965: Atlanta Mustangs
- Positions: Offensive tackle, linebacker

Coaching career (HC unless noted)
- 1972–1975: Brown (freshmen)
- 1976–1983: Springfield
- 1984–1999: Bowdoin

Head coaching record
- Overall: 88–114–3

Howard Sidney Vandersea (born September 12, 1941) was an American football player and coach. He served as the head football coach at Springfield College in Springfield, Massachusetts from 1976 to 1983 and at Bowdoin College from 1984 to 1999, compiling a career college football coaching record of 88–114–3. Vandersea played college football at Bates College.

== Head coaching record ==
Year	Team	Overall	Conference	Standing	Bowl/playoffs
Springfield Chiefs (NCAA Division II independent) (1976–1983)
1976	Springfield	5–4			
1977	Springfield	7–3			
1978	Springfield	4–6			
1979	Springfield	8–2			
1980	Springfield	7–2			
1981	Springfield	5–4			
1982	Springfield	3–7			
1983	Springfield	3–7			
Springfield:		42–35			
Bowdoin Polar Bears (New England Small College Athletic Conference) (1984–1999)
1984	Bowdoin	3–5			
1985	Bowdoin	5–3			
1986	Bowdoin	2–6			
1987	Bowdoin	5–3			
1988	Bowdoin	2–5–1			
1989	Bowdoin	1–6–1			
1990	Bowdoin	1–7			
1991	Bowdoin	4–4			
1992	Bowdoin	4–4			
1993	Bowdoin	3–4–1	3–4–1	6th	
1994	Bowdoin	2–6	2–6	T–7th	
1995	Bowdoin	1–7	1–7	T–9th	
1996	Bowdoin	3–5	3–5	T–6th	
1997	Bowdoin	4–4	4–4	T–5th	
1998	Bowdoin	5–3	5–3	T–4th	
1999	Bowdoin	1–7	1–7	9th	
Bowdoin:		46–79–3			
Total:		88–114–3			
