= Rommie Loudd =

American football player, coach, and executive (1933–1998)

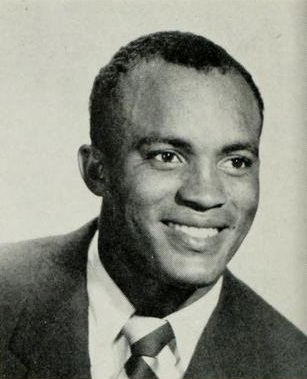

No. 77, 51, 60, 46, 58
- Position: Linebacker

Personal information
- Born: June 8, 1933; Madisonville, Texas, U.S.
- Died: May 9, 1998 (aged 64); Miami, Florida, U.S.
- Listed height: 6 ft 2 in (1.88 m)
- Listed weight: 227 lb (103 kg)

Career information
- High school: Jefferson (Los Angeles, California)
- College: UCLA
- NFL draft: 1956: 26th round, 304th overall pick

Career history

Playing
- BC Lions (1956); Los Angeles Chargers (1960); Boston Patriots (1961-1962); Boston / New Bedford Sweepers (1963-1965)

Coaching
- Boston Sweepers (1964) Defensive line; New Bedford Sweepers (1965) Assistant; Boston Patriots (1966) Assistant

Awards and highlights
- National champion (1954); First-team All-American (1955); First-team All-PCC (1955)

Career AFL statistics
- Interceptions: 4
- Sacks: 7
- Stats at Pro Football Reference

Rommie Lee Loudd (June 8, 1933 – May 9, 1998) was an American collegiate and professional football player, coach, and executive. He was the first black assistant coach in the American Football League (AFL) and the first black majority owner of a major league sports team. He played college football for the UCLA Bruins, earning first-team All-American honors in 1955.

== Playing career ==
Loudd was born in Madisonville, Texas, and played tight end for coach Red Sanders at the University of California, Los Angeles (UCLA) from 1953 to 1955. He was a member of the 1953 Bruins team that lost in the 1954 Rose Bowl and a member of the 1954 UCLA squad that was declared the FWAA & UPI National Champions.

He was selected by the San Francisco 49ers in the 26th round (304th overall) of the 1956 NFL draft. He instead signed with the BC Lions of the Canadian Football League. After being cut by the Chicago Bears in 1959, Loudd joined the newly formed American Football League as a member of the Los Angeles Chargers. He was released by the Chargers after one season and signed with the AFL' Boston Patriots.

== Coaching ==
In 1964, Loudd moved to coaching. He was the defensive coach of the Boston Sweepers of the Atlantic Coast Football League for two seasons before becoming the linebackers coach for the Boston Patriots and the first African-American coach in the history of the AFL. After two seasons as coach, Loudd moved to the front office, where he was the Patriots Director of Player Personnel from 1968 to 1971 and Director of Pro Scouting from 1971 to 1973.

In 1973, Loudd led a bid to get a National Football League franchise in Orlando, Florida. The expansion franchise would instead go to Philadelphia construction magnate Thomas McCloskey who founded the Tampa Bay Buccaneers. In 1974, Loudd became the owner of the Florida Blazers of the World Football League. He was the first black top executive in major league sports.
Loudd, one season, worked with Don Gillis for New England Patriots preseason.

== Legal troubles ==
On April 3, 1957, Loudd was charged with child molestation. He and four other men allegedly engaged in sodomy and other sexual acts with three boys, ages twelve, thirteen, and fifteen, who were picked up off the street wearing wigs and women's clothing. He was found guilty on two charges of child molestation and sentenced to six months in jail and five years of probation.

On December 23, 1974, Loudd was arrested on charges of embezzling state sales tax money. Three months later he was charged with conspiracy and delivery of cocaine. He was sentenced to two concurrent fourteen-year sentences for conviction on two counts of delivering cocaine. He was also sentenced to two years in prison for possession and distribution of cocaine. The sales tax embezzlement and conspiracy to deliver cocaine charges were dropped following his convictions on drug charges. After three years in prison, Loudd was released on parole. and became an associate minister at Mount Tabor Baptist Church.

== Death ==
Loudd died on May 9, 1998, in Miami, Florida, aged 64, of complications from diabetes.

== See also ==
- List of American Football League players
