= Don Allard =

American gridiron football player (1936–2002)

No. 83, 27, 12, 10, 20, 14
- Position: Quarterback

Personal information
- Born: April 21, 1936; Cambridge, Massachusetts, U.S.
- Died: May 4, 2002 (aged 66); Winchester, Massachusetts, U.S.
- Listed height: 6 ft 1 in (1.85 m)
- Listed weight: 188 lb (85 kg)

Career information
- High school: Somerville (MA)
- College: Boston College
- NFL draft: 1959: 1st round, 4th overall pick

Career history
- Saskatchewan Roughriders (1959–1960); Montreal Alouettes (1961–1962); New York Titans (1961); Boston Patriots (1962); Boston/New Bedford Sweepers (1964–1965)

Awards and highlights
- 2× Second-team All-Eastern (1957, 1958)
- Stats at Pro Football Reference

Donald J. Allard (April 21, 1936 – May 4, 2002) was an American college and professional football quarterback selected by the Washington Redskins in the first round of the 1959 NFL draft.

He played college football at Boston College, and played professionally in the American Football League for the New York Titans in 1961 and the Boston Patriots in 1962, in the Canadian Football League for the Saskatchewan Roughriders from 1959 to 1960 and the Montreal Alouettes from 1961 to 1962, and in the Atlantic Coast Football League with the Boston/New Bedford Sweepers from 1964 to 1965. He was the highest-drafted Boston College Eagles football player in school history until Matt Ryan in 2008.

== See also ==
- List of American Football League players
