= 1962 New York Titans season =

1962 season of AFL team New York Titans

- Owner: Harry Wismer (until Nov. 8)
- Head coach: Bulldog Turner
- Home stadium: Polo Grounds

Results
- Record: 5–9
- Division place: 4th AFL East
- Playoffs: Did not qualify

The 1962 New York Titans season was the third season for the team in the American Football League (AFL), and the final season for the franchise before becoming the Jets the following season. The Titans finished in last place in the AFL East with a record of 5–9.

== Roster ==
1962 New York Titans roster
Quarterbacks (QB): 12 Johnny Green; 17 Lee Grosscup; 19 Bob Scrabis; 12 Hayseed Stephens; Running backs (RB): 45 Dick Christy; 32 Bobby Fowler; 20 Curley Johnson P; 31 Bill Mathis; 24 Jim Tiller; Wide receivers (WR): 13 Don Maynard; 84 Art Powell; 80 Perry Richards CB; 29 Bill Shockley K; Tight ends (TE): 88 Thurlow Cooper; 86 Karl Kaimer	Offensive linemen (OL): 70 Gene Cockrell T; 56 Roger Ellis G/C; 62 Sid Fournet G; 52 Mike Hudock C; 55 Alex Kroll T; 67 Bob Mischak G; 79 Fran Morelli T; Defensive linemen (DL): 77 Dick Guesman DT; 75 John Kenerson DE/DT; 74 Nick Mumley DE; 73 George Strugar DT; 78 LaVerne Torczon DE/DT; 76 Bob Watters DE	Linebackers (LB): 57 Hubert Bobo MLB; 82 Ed Cooke OLB; 64 Jerry Fields OLB/MLB; 60 Larry Grantham OLB; Defensive backs (DB): 2 Billy Atkins SS; 26 Wayne Fontes CB; 33 Paul Hynes CB; 35 Ed Kovac SS; 40 Dainard Paulson CB; 22 Lee Riley FS; Special teams (ST)	Rookies in italics

== Schedule ==
Week	Date	Opponent	Result	Record	Venue	Attendance	Recap
1	September 9	at Oakland Raiders	**W** 28–17	1–0	Frank Youell Field	12,893	Recap
2	September 16	at San Diego Chargers	**L** 14–40	1–1	Balboa Stadium	22,003	Recap
3	September 22	at **Buffalo Bills**	**W** 17–6	2–1	War Memorial Stadium	24,024	Recap
4	September 30	Denver Broncos	**L** 10–32	2–2	Polo Grounds	5,729	Recap
5	October 6	**Boston Patriots**	**L** 14–43	2–3	Polo Grounds	4,719	Recap
6	October 14	at **Houston Oilers**	**L** 17–56	2–4	Jeppesen Stadium	20,650	Recap
7	October 21	at Dallas Texans	**L** 17–20	2–5	Cotton Bowl	17,814	Recap
8	October 28	San Diego Chargers	**W** 23–3	3–5	Polo Grounds	7,175	Recap
9	November 4	Oakland Raiders	**W** 31–21	4–5	Polo Grounds	4,728	Recap
10	November 11	Dallas Texans	**L** 31–52	4–6	Polo Grounds	5,974	Recap
11	Bye						
12	November 22	at Denver Broncos	**W** 46–45	5–6	Bears Stadium	15,776	Recap
13	November 30	at **Boston Patriots**	**L** 17–24	5–7	Boston University Field	20,015	Recap
14	December 8	**Buffalo Bills**	**L** 3–20	5–8	Polo Grounds	4,011	Recap
15	December 15	**Houston Oilers**	**L** 10–44	5–9	Polo Grounds	3,828	Recap
Note: Intra-division opponents are in **bold** text.

== Standings ==
AFL Eastern Division
	W	L	T	PCT	DIV	PF	PA	STK
Houston Oilers	11	3	0	.786	5–1	387	270	W7
Boston Patriots	9	4	1	.692	4–1–1	346	295	L1
Buffalo Bills	7	6	1	.538	1–4–1	309	272	W2
New York Titans	5	9	0	.357	1–5	278	423	L3

Note: Tie games were not officially counted in the standings in the AFL.
