= Pottstown Firebirds =

Defunct American football team

- Founded: 1968
- Dissolved: 1971
- League: Atlantic Coast Football League
- Based in: Pottstown, Pennsylvania
- Championships: 2

The Pottstown Firebirds were a professional American football minor league team and member of the Atlantic Coast Football League (ACFL) from 1968 to 1970. The Pottstown Firebirds played their home games at Pottstown High School stadium. In their final two seasons of existence in Pottstown (1969 and 1970), the Firebirds won the league championship.

== History ==
The Firebirds were founded in 1968 and were originally a "farm club" of the Philadelphia Eagles. The team was provided with equipment/helmets already emblazoned with Eagle wings. The Firebirds affiliation with the Philadelphia Eagles was short-lived and was withdrawn in 1970. In 1969 and 1970, the Firebirds won back-to-back ACFL championships.

In 1971, the Firebirds merged with the Norfolk Neptunes and left Pottstown. After the collapse of the ACFL a couple of years later, the World Football League sprang up. Many of the Pottstown Firebirds went on to play for the Philadelphia Bell as described in Vince Papale's book Invincible. Ron Waller, former Head Offensive Coach of the Firebirds, served as interim head coach of the San Diego Chargers for the final six games of 1973, then moved on to become head coach of the Philadelphia Bell in 1974.

== NFL Films documentary ==
The Firebirds were perhaps best remembered as the subject of a 1970 NFL Films documentary Pro Football, Pottstown, Pa. which documented the ties between the minor league club, its players, and their hometown of Pottstown, Pennsylvania. Of particular note was the portrayal of the Firebirds' star quarterback, Jim "The King" Corcoran. "The King" was considered the "Poor Man's Joe Namath" for his flamboyance; preferring to be a star in the minor leagues over a backup in the NFL, he played a single game in the NFL with the then-Boston Patriots in addition to preseason stints with several others.

In 2000, NFL Films returned to Pottstown for an episode of their Lost Treasures series. Pottstown Revisited covered some surviving players reminiscing about their days on the team, remembered the town's relationship with the long-gone football team, and filmed a 30-year player reunion.

== Funding ==
Bob "Chuz" Calvario and Al Cavallo were credited with founding the Firebirds minor league football franchise in Pottstown. To raise funds, Calvario and Cavallo assembled a group of local investors that all put up a few hundred dollars each and they also sold public stock. In order to secure a franchise, $10,000 was needed to post a performance bond with the ACFL. The franchise was secured but the group fell short of meeting their financial goals to fund an entire team until the entry of local millionaire Ed Gruber. The Pottstown Firebirds financial short-comings were over as Gruber put up the cash to attract the best minor league players money could buy. Ultimately, Gruber became the team owner and called all the shots.

== Key Landmarks ==
The Downtown Motor Inn's name has since gone but the hotel itself, at High and Manatawny Streets, still exists. The Firebirds and their staff lived there during the season.

The Firebird's "Roost" was a home near Hanover and Third Streets where a number of the Firebirds players lived. The "Roost" was later torn down and no longer exists today.

The Elks Home, 61 High Street, was the location where important team meetings took place and where the Firebirds ate a number of their meals. The Elks Home is still in operation today.

Pottstown High School – Firebird home games were played at the high school football stadium that is used to this day. Firebird team players used the high school locker room in the basement for practices and games. Not sure if the old locker room in the basement still exists today (2012) as the school had undergone renovations in the past few years.

Bellewood Country Club – Both mansions at this country club belonged to Gruber and was later purchased by investors to develop the location into a golf course.

== 1968 Results ==
Second Place Southern Division 6-5-1

08/17/1968 Harrisburg Capitol Colts 10 at Pottstown Firebirds 0 Franklin Field, Attendance of 5,000

08/24/1968 Virginia Sailors 13 vs Pottstown Firebirds 20 Hemdon Stadium, Virginia

09/07/1968 Hartford Knights 13 at Pottstown Firebirds 7 Franklin Field, Attendance of 6,150

09/14/1968 Bridgeport Jets 24 at Pottstown Firebirds 0 Franklin Field, Attendance of 5,228

09/21/1968 Lowell Giants 14 vs Pottstown Firebirds 35 Cawley Memorial Stadium, Lowell, MA, Attendance of 4,500

09/28/1968 Virginia Sailors 10 vs Pottstown Firebirds 7 Hemdon Stadium, Virginia, Attendance 3,723

10/05/1968 Harrisburg Capitol Colts 7 at Pottstown Firebirds 17 Franklin Field, Attendance 4,000

10/12/1968 Virginia Sailors 0 at Pottstown Firebirds 17 Franklin Field, Attendance 4,820

10/18/1968 Bridgeport Jets 27 vs Potstown Firebirds 7 John F. Kennedy Stadium, Bridgeport, CT, Attendance 13,246

10/26/1968 Lowell Giants 14 at Pottstown Firebirds 25 Franklin Field, Attendance 5,000

11/02/1968 Richmond Roadrunners 17 vs Pottstown Firebirds 17 City Stadium, Richmond, Virginia, Attendance 6,000

11/09/1968 Richmond Roadrunners 3 at Pottstown Firebirds 14 Franklin Field, Attendance 2,600

11/16/1968 Hartford Knights 35 vs Pottstown Firebirds 21, Dillon Stadium, Hartford, Connecticut, Attendance 5,200

11/23/1968 Harrisburg Capitol Colts 13 vs Pottstown Firebirds 27, New Island Park, Harrisburg, Pennsylvania

== 1968 Roster ==
#1 Fonash, John – Flanker/Wide-Receiver # 60 Levandowski, Leo – Guard

#11 Haynie, Jim – Quarterback #61 Parrish, Phil – Guard

#15 Wilson, George – Quarterback/Punter #63 Speers, Steve – Linebacker

#20 Elion, Charles – Halfback #64 Hall, Ed – Defensive End

#22 Neal, Ford – Halfback #65 Hughes, Walt – Guard

#30 Bibaud, Jean – Fullback #66 Morda, Lou – Linebacker

#31 Antonini, Frank – Fullback #67 Stillman, Pat – Guard

#32 Burton, Bob – Linebacker #68 Karl, Don – Defensive Tackle

#40 Drew, John – Fullback #70 Bubnis, Brian – Guard

#41 Allen, Buddy – Defensive Back #71 Gassert, Ron – Tackle

#42 Klein, Jim – Defensive Back #72 Brooks, Jon – Guard

#43 Stancell, Harold – Defensive Back #77 Fry, John – Tackle

#44 Ross, Sherman – Defensive Back #79 Harris, Randy – Defensive End

#45 Pyne, Ed – Kicker/Defensive Back #82 Day, Pressly – Defensive Tackle

#46 Brown, Tom – Defensive Back #83 Derry, Stan – Defensive End

#49 DiPhillippo, Jerry – Linebacker #84 Souels, Dick – Flanker/Wide-Receiver

#50 Ross, Tom – Defensive Tackle #87 Murphy, H.D. – OE

#51 Kosmos, Mark – Linebacker #88 Pelkington, Bob – Tight-End

#52 Cercel, Paul – Center #89 McKnight, Ostell – OE

#55 Hale, Danny – Linebacker

== 1969 Roster ==
#3 Wilkinson, Don – Wide-Receiver

#10 Hayne, Jim – Quarterback

#13 Dial, Benji – Quarterback

#16 Nauss, Herb – Defensive Back

#18 Harold, George – Defensive Back

#21 Dobbins, Oliver – Defensive Back

#22 Austin, Joe – Defensive Back

#24 Ross, Sherman – Defensive Back

#25 Grimes, Roger – Running Back

#26 Land, John – Running Back

#34 Adams, Gary – Defensive Back

#35 Goodwin, Doug – Running Back

#37 Watts, Claude – Running Back

#41 Allen, Buddy – Defensive Back

#50 Alois, Art – Center

#51 Kosmos, Mark - Linebacker

#52 Speers, Steve – Linebacker

#53 DiPhillippo, Jerry – Linebacker

#54 Foster, Jim – Linebacker

#58 Clay, Roy – Linebacker

#61 Levandowski, Leo – Offensive Guard

#63 Hughes, Walter – Offensive Guard

#64 Barber, John – Offensive Guard

#68 Cercel, Paul – Center

#70 Sarkisian, Tom – Offensive Tackle

#73 Stetz, Bill – Defensive Tackle

#74 Puterbaugh, Bruce – Defensive Tackle

#76 Key, Wade - Offensive Tackle

#77 Blake, Joe – Defensive End

#78 Davis, Tommie – Defensive End

#79 Ross, Tom – Defensive Tackle

#80 Barnhorst, Dick – Wide Receiver

#81 Pyne, Ed – Split End

#83 Angevine, Leon – Split End

#84 Tucker, Bob - Tight End

#85 Day, Pressly – Defensive End

#87 Wink, Dean – Tight End

#88 Carr, Tom – Defensive End

== 1969 Staff and Coaches ==
Team Owner – Ed Gruber

Head coach – Dave Difilippo

President - Robert Calvario

Offensive Coordinator & Business Manager – Ron Waller

Vice-president – William Miller, Jr.

Assistants - Joe Rogers, John Schweder, Carmen Cavelli

Publicity Director – Bill Dougherty

Treasurer - Donald F. Specht

Secretary - Robert Tyson

== 1970 Season ==
11 Wins

& 1 loss

09/12/70 Firebirds-41 Roanoke Buckskins-0

09/19/70 Firebirds-38 Richmond Saints-10

09/26/70 Firebirds-24 Indianapolis Caps-9

10/03/70 Firebirds-20 Jersey Jays-9

10/09/70 Firebirds-30 Bridgeport Jets-26

10/17/70 Firebirds-36 Hartford Knights-27

10/31/70 Firebirds-35 Norfolk Neptunes-24

11/07/70 Firebirds-14 Orlando Panthers-12

11/14/70 Firebirds-34 Indianapolis Caps-13

11/20/70 Firebirds-22 Long Island Bulls-13

11/29/70 Firebirds-7 Norfolk Neptunes-22

12/06/70 Firebirds-18 Richmond Saints-0

Championship Game

12/12/70 Firebirds-31 Hartford Knights-0

== 1970 Roster ==
Adams, Ernie - Offensive Guard

Allen, Buddy - Defensive Back

Alley, Don - Tight End

Barber, John - Offensive Guard

Barnhorst, Dick - Wide Receiver

Baughn, Jim - Defensive Tackle

Berger, Greg - Defensive Back

Blake, Joe - Defensive End

Carr, Tom - Assistant Coach

Corcoran, Sean Patrick "Jimmy" - Quarterback

Davis, Tommy - Defensive Tackle

Demzcuk, Sonny - Tight End

DiMuzio, Tom - Quarterback/Halfback

Diphillippo, Jerry - Linebacker

DiSantis, Frank - Guard/Linebacker

Dolbin, Jack - Wide Receiver

Foster, Jim - Linebacker

Gravelle, Howard - Tight End

Haynie, Jim - Quarterback

Holliday, Ron - Flanker

Land, John - Running Back

Levandowski, Leo - Center

Marshall, Bryan - Defensive Back

McGuigan, Frank - Running Back

Mitchell, Frank - Offensive Tackle

Nauss, Herb - Defensive Back

Puterbaugh, Bruce - Offensive Tackle

Pyne, Ed - Kicker and Tight End

Rakow, Billy - Defensive Back

Ross, Sherman - Defensive Back

Sarkisian, Tom - Offensive Tackle

Stetz, Bill - Defensive Tackle

Thrower, Jim - Defensive Back

Watts, Claude - Running Back

Weedman, Dave - Linebacker

Wells, Harold - Linebacker

Zegalia, Steve - Linebacker

President – Bob "Chuz" Calvario

General Manager/Head coach – Dave DiFilippo

Head Offensive Coach - Ron Waller

Head Defensive Coach - Andy Nelson

Assistant Coach - Tom Carr

Bomb Squad Coach - Pressly Lee Day

Public Relations - Bill "Doc" Dougherty

Public Relations - Denny "Peaches" Pietro

Team Physician - Dr. Daniel Gross

Trainer – Bill "Scotty" Scott

Assistant Trainer – Bill Kirlin

Equipment Manager – John DeGregorio

Ball Boys - Dave Musser, John Katch, and Steve Cavallo
