= Dave Fleming (Canadian football) =

American gridiron football player (1944–2020)

Profile
- Positions: Halfback, Running back

Personal information
- Born: March 9, 1944; Hazelwood, Pennsylvania, U.S.
- Died: April 22, 2020 (aged 76); Munhall, Pennsylvania, U.S.
- Listed height: 6 ft 0 in (1.83 m)
- Listed weight: 205 lb (93 kg)

Career information
- High school: Gladstone (Pittsburgh, PA)

Career history
- 1963–1965: Pittsburgh Valley Ironmen
- 1965–1974: Hamilton Tiger-Cats

Awards and highlights
- 3× Grey Cup champion (1965, 1967, 1972)

Dave Fleming (March 9, 1944 – April 22, 2020) was an American professional football player who played for the Hamilton Tiger-Cats. He won the Grey Cup with them in 1965, 1967 and 1972.
