= Atlanta Spartans =

Former Georgia, USA football team

- Founded: 1964
- Folded: 1964
- League: Atlantic Coast Football League
- Based in: Atlanta, Georgia
- Arena: Ponce de Leon Park
- Championships: 0

The Atlanta Spartans were a minor league American football team based in Atlanta, Georgia. They played just one season in the Atlantic Coast Football League (ACFL) in 1964 and played their home games at Ponce de Leon Park.

== History ==
In February 1964, the Atlanta Spartans were granted admission into the ACFL. The Spartans joined the 14-team league as a member of the Southern Division.

In their only season in 1964, the Spartans went 4–9 and finished in fifth place in the Southern Division. The team was coached by Johnny Dell Isola. Isola was also joined by five assistants on his coaching staff: Bob Merenda, Ed Nutting, Joe Silas, Ken Webb, and Jerry Wilson.

Webb and Nutting both served in player-coach roles for the Spartans. Webb was listed as a punter, running back, and defensive back on the roster and scored six touchdowns for the Spartans in 1964. Nutting played at the center position.

Apart from Webb and Nutting, several other players were important for the Spartans in their only ACFL season. Quarterback Joe House threw for 1554 yards as the Spartans lead signal caller, Johnny Dahar led the Spartans with nine touchdowns playing at the fullback position, and tight end Mickey Babb scored six touchdowns during the season.

The Spartans started the 1964 season on August 22, 1964, losing to the Jersey Giants 34-0 in Jersey City, New Jersey. The ACFL started the 1964 season in a staggered fashion, with the Spartans having a belated season-opener, starting their season one to two weeks after most other teams in the 14-team ACFL.

During their only ACFL season, the Spartans struggled to meet their financial obligations and were suspended by the ACFL. The league threatened to revoke the franchise mid season if the obligations were not met. The Spartans finished out the season but folded after one year in the ACFL.

The Spartans played their final game as a franchise on November 21, 1964, winning their final regular season game against the Mohawk Valley Falcons 31-28 in Atlanta. The Spartans would fail to qualify for the 1964 playoffs, ending their season.

== Season-by-season ==
	Year	League	W	L	T	Finish	Coach
Atlanta Spartans	1964	Atlantic Coast Football League	4	9	0	5th, Southern Division	Johnny Dell Isola
