= Bob Fry =

American football player and coach (1930–2019)

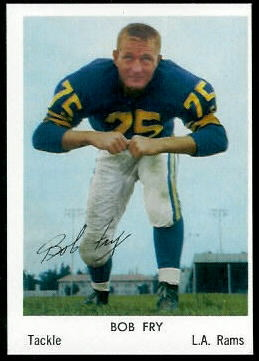
- Fry in 1959

No. 72, 75
- Positions: Tackle, guard

Personal information
- Born: November 11, 1930; Cincinnati, Ohio, U.S.
- Died: November 10, 2019 (aged 88); Wilmington, North Carolina, U.S.
- Listed height: 6 ft 4 in (1.93 m)
- Listed weight: 235 lb (107 kg)

Career information
- High school: Elder (Cincinnati)
- College: Kentucky (1949–1952)
- NFL draft: 1953: 3rd round, 36th overall pick

Career history

Playing
- Los Angeles Rams (1953, 1956–1959); Dallas Cowboys (1960–1964); Cleveland Browns (1965)*
- * Offseason or practice squad member only

Coaching
- Atlanta Falcons (1967) Assistant offensive line coach; Atlanta Falcons (1968) Offensive line coach; Pittsburgh Steelers (1969–1973) Offensive line coach; New York Jets (1974–1982) Offensive line coach; Atlanta Falcons (1983–1984) Offensive line coach

Awards and highlights
- 2× Third-team All-SEC (1951, 1952)

Career NFL statistics
- Games played: 126
- Games started: 118
- Fumble recoveries: 5
- Stats at Pro Football Reference
- Coaching profile at Pro Football Reference

Robert Moellering Fry (November 11, 1930 – November 10, 2019) was an American professional football offensive lineman in the National Football League (NFL) for the Los Angeles Rams and Dallas Cowboys. He played college football at the University of Kentucky and was drafted in the third round of the 1953 NFL draft.

== Early life ==
Fry attended Elder High School before moving on to the University of Kentucky, where he was coached by Paul "Bear" Bryant. He was a part of the freshman basketball team that included Cliff Hagan and Frank Ramsey.

In 1950, he was named the starting offensive end as a sophomore and contributed to Kentucky's best season under Bryant, finishing with an 11–1 record and a 13–7 upset in the Sugar Bowl over the eventual national champions the University of Oklahoma, also ending the Sooners' 31-game winning streak.

As a senior, he was moved to the offensive tackle position and earned his second straight third-team All-SEC honors.

== Professional career ==
=== Los Angeles Rams ===
Fry was selected by the Los Angeles Rams in the third round (36th overall) of the 1953 NFL draft. He became a starter at left tackle as a rookie, before spending the next two years out of football while serving his military service.

He returned in 1956 and maintained his starting role for four straight seasons, even though at the time he was one of the lightest offensive linemen in the NFL.

=== Dallas Cowboys ===
Fry was selected by the Dallas Cowboys after being left unprotected in the 1960 NFL expansion draft, becoming the first starting left tackle in franchise history.

He was a starter on the left side of the line during the Cowboys first three seasons, until he lost his spot to Tony Liscio in the middle of the 1963 season and was moved to the right tackle position in place of Ed Nutting.

In 1964, he started five games at right tackle, after being passed on the depth chart by Ray Schoenke. On July 19, 1965, he was traded to the Cleveland Browns in exchange for a player to be named later.

=== Cleveland Browns ===
Fry retired after being released by the Cleveland Browns on August 29, 1965.

== Coaching career ==
In 1967, after being the Atlanta Falcons' chief talent scout, he was named the assistant offensive line coach and eventually was promoted to offensive line coach.

In 1969, he joined the Pittsburgh Steelers as the offensive line coach.

In 1974, Fry began a nine-year stint as the New York Jets offensive line coach. He resigned in 1983 after the unexpected firing of head coach Walt Michaels, becoming the offensive line coach and offensive coordinator for the Atlanta Falcons.

== Awards ==
In 2020, Fry was inducted into the Kentucky Pro Football Hall of Fame.
