= Ed Nutting =

American football player (1939–2022)

No. 78, 76
- Position: Offensive tackle

Personal information
- Born: February 8, 1939; Washington, D.C., U.S.
- Died: May 20, 2022 (aged 83); Atlanta, Georgia, U.S.
- Listed height: 6 ft 4 in (1.93 m)
- Listed weight: 246 lb (112 kg)

Career information
- High school: Atlanta (GA) Northside
- College: Georgia Tech
- NFL draft: 1961: 2nd round, 27th overall pick
- AFL draft: 1961: 15th round, 117th overall pick

Career history

Playing
- Cleveland Browns (1961); Dallas Cowboys (1962–1963); Atlanta Spartans (1964)

Coaching
- Atlanta Spartans (1964) Assistant coach

Career NFL statistics
- Games played: 18
- Games started: 8
- Fumble recoveries: 2
- Stats at Pro Football Reference

John Edward Nutting Jr. (February 8, 1939 – May 20, 2022) was an American professional football offensive tackle in the National Football League (NFL) for the Cleveland Browns and Dallas Cowboys. He played college football at Georgia Tech.

== Early life ==
Nutting attended Northside High School. He accepted a football scholarship from Georgia Tech, where he was a two-way tackle. He set an SEC shot put record in 1960.

He left school before his college eligibility was over, in order to join the NFL.

== Professional career ==
=== Cleveland Browns ===
Nutting was selected in the second round (27th overall) of the 1961 NFL draft by the Cleveland Browns. He was also drafted in the 15th round (117th overall) of the 1961 AFL draft by the Dallas Texans. On June 19, 1961, he signed a professional contract with the Cleveland Browns.

As a rookie, he suffered a knee injury in the fourth game of the season against the Washington Redskins and was placed on the injured reserve list. On July 22, 1962, he was traded to the Dallas Cowboys in exchange for fullback Merrill Douglas.

=== Dallas Cowboys ===
On July 30, 1962, he suffered a serious right knee injury and was lost for the season after being placed on the injured reserve list. In 1963, he started the first seven games at right tackle, until losing his spot to Bob Fry, who was moved to the right side to allow Tony Liscio to start at left tackle.

In 1964, he announced his retirement to devote more time to his advertising business.

== Personal life and death ==
Nutting married Forrest Armstrong and had two children, a daughter Forrest and a son, Bradford, as well as grandchildren, Madeline, Conner, Darby, and Savannah.

He was married to his wife for 51 years. He was a member of Sigma Nu fraternity. He attended the Woodrow Wilson School of Law and passed the Georgia Bar. He had a long career in commercial real estate. He received the Silver Phoenix Award through the Atlanta Board of Realtors. Nutting died on May 20, 2022, at the age of 83.
