= Virginia Sailors =

Defunct American football team

- Founded: 1966
- Folded: 1968
- League: Atlantic Coast Football League
- Based in: Arlington, Virginia, Alexandria, Virginia, Herndon, Virginia
- Arena: Wakefield High School Stadium, Montgomery Field, Herndon Stadium
- Championships: 2 (1966, 1967)

The Virginia Sailors were a minor league American football team based in the Washington metropolitan area, operating in Arlington, Virginia, Alexandria, Virginia, and Herndon, Virginia during its existence.

== History ==
The Virginia Sailors played three seasons in the Atlantic Coast Football League (ACFL) from 1966 to 1968 and played their home games at Wakefield High School Stadium, Montgomery Field, and Herndon Stadium. The Sailors were coached by head coach Billy Cox. In 1966 and 1967, the Sailors won the ACFL championship.

During its existence, the Sailors were affiliated with the Washington Redskins and received players from the Redskins taxi squad. Under the leadership of coach Cox, a former Redskins player himself, the Sailors dominated the ACFL in their three seasons of existence. The team posted a 25-6 regular season mark from 1966 to 1968.

In the postseason, the Sailors defeated the Lowell Giants in the 1966 ACFL championship game and repeated with a victory over the Westchester Bulls in 1967. In 1968, the Sailors were defeated by the Hartford Knights 30–17 in the championship game, failing to three-peat as champions. The championship game played on November 30, 1968, would be their final game as a franchise in the ACFL.
