= Boston Steamrollers =

Former Massachusetts, USA football team

- Founded: 1965
- Folded: 1965
- League: Atlantic Coast Football League
- Based in: Everett, Massachusetts
- Arena: Everett Memorial Stadium

The Boston Steamrollers were a team in the Atlantic Coast Football League. They played their home games at the Everett Memorial Stadium in Everett, Massachusetts. The Steamrollers played one season in the ACFL in 1965.

The Steamrollers came to Everett thanks to the departure and disbanding of two franchises in the ACFL in the spring of 1965. The Boston Sweepers, the prior ACFL tenants at Everett Memorial Stadium, moved south to New Bedford, Massachusetts. Meanwhile, the Providence Steamroller franchise disbanded.
