= Tom Songin =

American ice hockey player (born 1953)

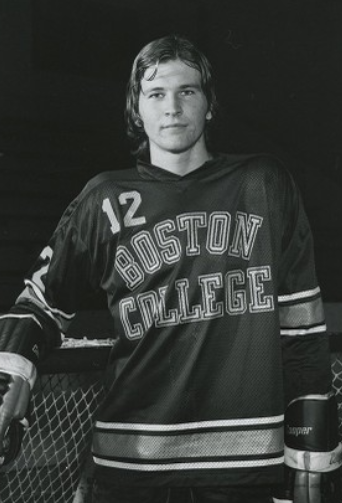
- Songin while with Boston College, c. 1973–1977
- Born: December 20, 1953 (age 72) Norwood, Massachusetts, U.S.A.
- Height: 6 ft 3 in (191 cm)
- Weight: 197 lb (89 kg; 14 st 1 lb)
- Position: Right wing
- Shot: Right
- Played for: Boston Bruins
- NHL draft: Undrafted
- Playing career: 1978–1981

Thomas Songin (born December 20, 1953) is an American former professional ice hockey player who played 43 games in the National Hockey League (NHL) with the Boston Bruins between 1978 and 1981. He recorded five goals and five assists.

== Biography ==
A native of Norwood, Massachusetts, Songin is the nephew of professional football player Butch Songin. He played scholastic ice hockey at Mount Saint Charles Academy (MSC) and Northwood School, leading MSC to the Rhode Island state championship in 1971–72 as the state scoring champion with 27 goals and 43 assists. Songin went on to attend Boston College, where he earned eight varsity letters as a star baseball and ice hockey player. A power-hitting shortstop on the baseball diamond, he played collegiate summer baseball with the Yarmouth Red Sox of the Cape Cod Baseball League in 1974, and returned to the league in 1975 and 1976 to play for the Orleans Cardinals.

Songin was undrafted out of college, and went on to play in parts of three seasons for the Boston Bruins. His first NHL goal came in Toronto on December 5, 1978, in Boston's 5-1 victory over the Maple Leafs. Songin was an assistant coach at the University of Massachusetts Boston in 1988–89, and was inducted into the Boston College Varsity Club Hall of Fame in 1996, and the Mount Saint Charles Athletic Hall of Fame in 2012.

== Career statistics ==
=== Regular season and playoffs ===
			Regular season					Playoffs
Season	Team	League	GP	G	A	Pts	PIM	GP	G	A	Pts	PIM
1971–72	Mount Saint Charles Academy	HSRI	—	27	43	70	—	—	—	—	—	—
1972–73	Northwood School	HS-Prep	—	—	—	—	—	—	—	—	—	—
1973–74	Boston College	HE	5	0	1	1	4	—	—	—	—	—
1974–75	Boston College	HE	28	13	27	40	44	—	—	—	—	—
1975–76	Boston College	HE	22	9	7	16	24	—	—	—	—	—
1976–77	Boston College	HE	27	7	7	14	24	—	—	—	—	—
1977–78	Long Beach Sharks	PHL	42	25	25	50	66	—	—	—	—	—
1978–79	Boston Bruins	NHL	17	3	1	4	0	—	—	—	—	—
1978–79	Rochester Americans	AHL	59	21	38	59	92	—	—	—	—	—
1979–80	Boston Bruins	NHL	17	1	3	4	16	—	—	—	—	—
1979–80	Binghamton Dusters	AHL	63	24	39	63	36	—	—	—	—	—
1980–81	Boston Bruins	NHL	9	1	1	2	6	—	—	—	—	—
1980–81	Springfield Indians	AHL	57	26	32	58	68	2	0	1	1	24
1981–82	Erie Blades	AHL	53	10	26	36	10	—	—	—	—	—
1982–83	Birmingham South Stars	CHL	5	0	1	1	2	—	—	—	—	—
AHL totals			232	81	135	216	206	2	0	1	1	24
NHL totals			43	5	5	10	22	—	—	—	—	—
