= Merrill Douglas =

American football player (1936–2025)

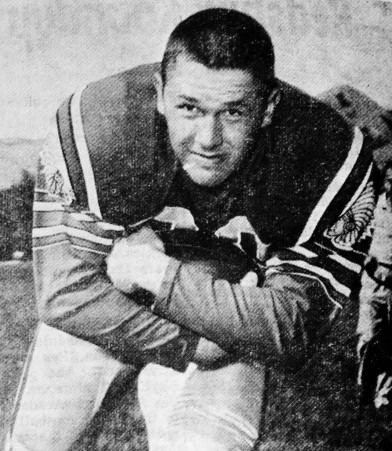
- Douglas, circa 1957

No. 36, 34, 33
- Position: Running back

Personal information
- Born: March 15, 1936; Salt Lake City, Utah, U.S.
- Died: March 1, 2025 (aged 88)
- Listed height: 6 ft 0 in (1.83 m)
- Listed weight: 204 lb (93 kg)

Career information
- High school: Olympus (Holladay, Utah)
- College: Utah
- NFL draft: 1958: 6th round, 65th overall pick

Career history
- Chicago Bears (1958–1960); Dallas Cowboys (1961); Cleveland Browns (1962)*; Philadelphia Eagles (1962); New York Jets (1963)*
- * Offseason or practice squad member only

Awards and highlights
- 2× All-Skyline (1956, 1957)

Career NFL statistics
- Rushing yards: 213
- Rushing average: 3.9
- Receptions: 4
- Receiving yards: 26
- Total touchdowns: 2
- Stats at Pro Football Reference

Merrill George Douglas (March 15, 1936 – March 1, 2025) was an American professional football player who was a running back in the National Football League (NFL) for the Chicago Bears, Dallas Cowboys, and Philadelphia Eagles. He played college football for the Utah Utes.

== Early life ==
Douglas attended Granite High School, before transferring to Olympus High School. He received All-state honors at fullback twice. He accepted a football scholarship from the University of Utah.

As a junior for the Utes, he became a starter and had 83 carries for 504 yards (second on the team), with a 6.1-yard average and 7 touchdowns. As a senior, he posted 97 carries for 646 yards (second in the league), with a 6.7-yard average and 10 touchdowns, while also leading the conference in scoring. He also lettered in baseball.

In 1988, he was inducted into the Utah Sports Hall of Fame.

== Professional career ==
=== Chicago Bears ===
Douglas was selected by the Chicago Bears in the sixth round (65th overall) of the 1958 NFL draft. He was a backup fullback behind Rick Casares. He was released in 1961.

=== Dallas Cowboys ===
On September 7, 1961, he was claimed off waivers by the Dallas Cowboys and played in six games. On April 22, 1962, he was traded to the Cleveland Browns in exchange for offensive tackle Ed Nutting.

=== Cleveland Browns ===
On September 10, 1962, he was waived by the Cleveland Browns. He was one of the team's final two cuts as it trimmed its roster to 36, the regular season limit at the time.

=== Philadelphia Eagles ===
On September 18, 1962, he was signed as a free agent by the Philadelphia Eagles. He was the third-string fullback.

=== New York Jets ===
On September 3, 1963, he was released by the New York Jets.

=== Personal life and death ===
Douglas was a side judge in the NFL for eleven seasons from 1981 through 1991, wearing uniform number 102. He worked for the Salt Lake County Sheriff's Department for 25 years.

Douglas died on March 1, 2025, at the age of 88.
