= Fred Wallner =

American football player and coach (1928–1999)

No. 18, 68, 61, 64
- Positions: Guard, linebacker

Personal information
- Born: April 28, 1928; Greenfield, Massachusetts, U.S.
- Died: November 4, 1999 (aged 71); Hartford, Connecticut, U.S.
- Listed height: 6 ft 2 in (1.88 m)
- Listed weight: 231 lb (105 kg)

Career information
- High school: Greenfield
- College: Notre Dame
- NFL draft: 1951: 20th round, 235th overall pick

Career history

Playing
- Chicago Cardinals (1951–1952, 1954–1955); Houston Oilers (1960)

Coaching
- Hartford Charter Oaks (1964-1965); Hartford Knights (1968-1971)

Awards and highlights
- AFL champion (1960); Pro Bowl (1955); National champion (1949)

Career NFL/AFL statistics
- Games played: 52
- Games started: 42
- Fumble recoveries: 4
- Interceptions: 3
- Stats at Pro Football Reference

Frederick William Wallner (born April 28, 1928 – November 4, 1999) was an American professional football player who was a guard for five seasons in the National Football League (NFL) and one season (1960) with the Houston Oilers of the American Football League (AFL). He was a member of the Oilers' first AFL championship team. He played college football for the Notre Dame Fighting Irish.

== See also ==
- Other American Football League players
