= Ansonia Black Knights =

Former Connecticut, USA football team

- Founded: 1962
- Folded: 1964
- League: Atlantic Coast Football League
- Based in: Ansonia, Connecticut
- Arena: Nolan Field
- Championships: 0

The Ansonia Black Knights were a minor league American football team based in Ansonia, Connecticut. They began play in the Atlantic Coast Football League in 1962 and played their home games at Nolan Field. The team finished fourth out of six teams during the ACFL's inaugural season. Their head coach was Gene Casey, formerly a line coach with the University of Illinois and an assistant coach with Southern Connecticut State College.

As with many minor league football teams of the era, Ansonia was plagued by poor attendance and financial difficulties. After just two seasons in the league, the ACFL revoked the Black Knights' franchise at a league meeting in February 1964 and replaced them with the Hartford Charter Oaks. The Hartford Knights would revive the knight motif when they replaced the Charter Oaks in 1968.

== Season-by-season ==
	Year	League	W	L	T	Finish	Coach
Ansonia Black Knights	1962	Atlantic Coast Football League	4	5	1	4th, ACFL	Gene Casey
Ansonia Black Knights	1963	Atlantic Coast Football League	4	8	0	4th, Northern Division	Gene Casey
