= Pittsburgh Valley Ironmen =

American football team, 1963–1965

- Founded: 1963
- Folded: 1965
- League: Atlantic Coast Football League
- Based in: Munhall, Pennsylvania
- Arena: West Field

The Pittsburgh Valley Ironmen were a minor league American football team based in Munhall, Pennsylvania. They played three seasons in the Atlantic Coast Football League (ACFL) from 1963 to 1965 and played their home games at West Field in Munhall.

== History ==
Pittsburgh went 6-6 in its inaugural 1963 season under head coach Dick Bowen. Bobby Mulgado led the Ironmen in scoring in 1963 with 10 touchdowns, followed closely by Duke Sumpter with nine touchdowns. Quarterback Tony Soukovich threw for 945 yards and 6 touchdowns.

In 1964, the Ironmen finished 8-5 under head coach Dick Bowen. Dave Fleming led the team in touchdowns with nine, kicker Alex DeRosa led the team in points with 81 total. Quarterback Tommy Wade threw for 1912 yards and 10 touchdowns over the course of the 1964 season.

1965 was the Ironmen's final season in the ACFL and the team finished with a 3-5 record under Bowen. Milgado led the team in touchdowns with three. Quarterback Ron Skosnik threw for 789 yards and six touchdowns.
