= Westchester Bulls =

American football team, 1967 to 1968

- Founded: 1967
- Folded: 1968
- League: Atlantic Coast Football League
- Based in: Mount Vernon, New York
- Stadium: Memorial Stadium

The Westchester Bulls were a minor league American football team based in Mount Vernon, New York. They played two seasons in the Atlantic Coast Football League (ACFL) from 1967 to 1968 and played their home games at Memorial Stadium in Mount Vernon. The Bulls were the minor league farm team for the New York Giants for two seasons.

== History ==
In 1967, the Bulls first season in the Atlantic Coast Football League, they finished with a 10–2 record. Ronnie Blye led the team in 1967 with seven touchdowns. Blye would go on to play in the NFL for the New York Giants and Philadelphia Eagles. Quarterback John DeNoia led the team in passing with 1204 yards and nine passing touchdowns in 1967. Westchester would go to the 1967 championship game and lose 20–14 to the Virginia Sailors.

In 1968, Westchester played their final season in the ACFL as the Westchester Bulls, finishing with a 5–7 record and missing the playoffs. Jack Emmer and Bo Hickey led the team in touchdowns (4), Roger Nitsch led the team in rushing touchdowns (3), Hank Washington led in passing touchdowns (4).

In 1969, the team relocated to play their home games at Hofstra University Stadium in Hempstead, New York and became the Long Island Bulls.
