= Jersey Giants =

Defunct American football team

- Founded: 1963
- Folded: 1966
- League: Atlantic Coast Football League
- Team history: Jersey Giants (1963); Jersey City Giants (1964); Jersey Jets (1965–1966)
- Based in: Jersey City, New Jersey
- Arena: Roosevelt Stadium

The Jersey Giants were a professional American football team based in Jersey City, New Jersey. The franchise also went by the names Jersey City Giants and Jersey Jets during its four seasons of operation in the Atlantic Coast Football League.
