= Lowell Giants =

Defunct American football team

- Founded: 1966
- Folded: 1969
- League: Atlantic Coast Football League
- Based in: Lowell, Massachusetts
- Arena: Cawley Memorial Stadium

The Lowell Giants were a minor league American football team based in Lowell, Massachusetts. They played three seasons in the Atlantic Coast Football League (ACFL) from 1966 to 1968 and played their home games at Cawley Memorial Stadium. Ken MacAfee coached the team from 1966 to 1967 before being replaced by Ross O'Hanley, who coached the team in 1968 and 1969. In 1969, the team moved to Quincy, Massachusetts and was renamed to the Quincy Giants. The team folded after the 1969 season. During its existence, the Giants were affiliated with the Green Bay Packers.

== History ==
The Giants were founded in 1966 and began play in Lowell, Massachusetts as the Lowell Giants. The team remained in Lowell until 1969, when the team was moved to Quincy, Massachusetts. The Giants moved to Quincy from Lowell less than a month before the first game of the 1969 season. Following the 1969 season and just one season being based in Quincy, the Giants folded from the ACFL.

In 1966, Ken MacAfee was hired as the first head coach in Giants history. MacAfee would coach the team for two seasons, in 1966 and 1967. MacAfee was familiar with the area near Lowell, having grown up in the area, being born in Milton, Massachusetts. MacAfee played football at Quincy High School, Portsmouth High School, and Oliver Ames High School.

The Giants first game in franchise history came against the Rhode Island Steelers, the farm club of the Pittsburgh Steelers of the National Football League (NFL). The game was played in Lowell and resulted in a dominant win for the Giants, who won in a 21–0 shutout.

In the 1966 season, the Giants had an extremely promising inaugural season. The team started off unbeaten through their first nine games. The Giants would lose their first game to the Waterbury Orbits 17–20 on October 22, 1966.

Finishing 9–2–1 in 1966 earned the Giants the Northern Division championship in the ACFL and the chance to face the Southern Division champions Virginia Sailors for the ACFL championship. The Giants would lose the title game on the road against the Sailors, 10–42.

In 1967, the Giants began the season as one of the favorites to win the ACFL title as the defending Northern Division champions. Lowell would finish with a 7–5 record and second place in the division, denying them a chance to play for the title.

The Giants would struggle mightily in their final two seasons in the ACFL, finishing 2–8–1 in 1968 and 2–9 in 1969.
