= Springfield Acorns =

Minor league American football team (1963-1964)

- Founded: 1963
- Folded: 1964
- League: Atlantic Coast Football League
- Based in: Springfield, Massachusetts
- Arena: Pynchon Park
- Owner: Acorn Sports Association
- Championships: 0

The Springfield Acorns were a minor league American football team based in Springfield, Massachusetts. They began play in the Atlantic Coast Football League in 1963. The Acorns played their homes games in Pynchon Park. Following the 1964 season, the Acorns relocated to Norfolk, Virginia and became the Neptunes.

== Season-by-season ==
Year	W	L	T	Finish	Coach	Ref.
1963	7	5	0	1st, Northern Division; Lost in ACFL Championship	Harry Leonardi	
1964	9	5	0	2nd, Northern Division	Harry Leonardi; Tommy O'Connell	

== Notable players ==
- Dan Henning
