= Mohawk Valley Falcons =

Defunct American football team

- Founded: 1962
- Folded: 1965
- League: Atlantic Coast Football League
- Team history: Frankfort Falcons (1962); Mohawk Valley Falcons (1963-1965)
- Based in: Herkimer, New York
- Arena: Harmon Field

The Mohawk Valley Falcons were a minor league American football team based in Herkimer, New York. They played four seasons in the Atlantic Coast Football League (ACFL) from 1962 to 1965 and played their home games at Harmon Field.

== History ==
=== Frankfort ===
The Falcons franchise began play as the Frankfort Falcons in 1962, finishing with a 1–9 record in their first season in the ACFL. In their first season, the Falcons were coached by Frank Sanders. After the 1962 season, the franchise was moved to Herkimer, New York and renamed to the Mohawk Valley Falcons

=== Mohawk Valley ===
After a disappointing season in 1962, the Falcons started anew in 1963 with their move to New York. The Falcons also hired two new head coaches, Fred Mautino and Ken Patrick. The team improved to a 5–7 record in 1963.

The Falcons were disbanded in March 1966.
