= Norfolk Neptunes =

Defunct American football team

- Founded: 1965
- Folded: 1971
- League: Continental Football League (1966–1969); Atlantic Coast Football League (1970–1971)
- Based in: Norfolk, Virginia
- Stadium: Foreman Field

The Norfolk Neptunes were an American football franchise based in Norfolk, Virginia that played in the Continental Football League from 1965 until 1969 and the Atlantic Coast Football League from 1970 to 1971. The team played at Foreman Field at Old Dominion University in Norfolk.

Throughout their existence the team drew 574,481 fans in 47 home games (12,223 per contest), at the time, the highest number (on average) in the history of minor league football.

== History ==
The franchise itself was originally based in Springfield, Massachusetts, where it was known as the Acorns. It was established as an ACFL team in 1963, lasting two years there before joining with several other teams to form the Continental League. Before the first season in the Continental League, the Acorns relocated to Norfolk.

The Neptunes were among the most commercially successful professional football teams of its era outside of the two major leagues (NFL and AFL); the 1969 season featured the team drawing over 13,000 fans per game to their contests, more than double the Continental League average. The team also enjoyed a fair share of on-field success as well; career minor-league quarterback King Corcoran led the team to the 1971 ACFL championship over the Hartford Knights.

Vivian Seaborne, a Southampton County, Virginia native, and cousin of Pearl Bailey was the first African American cheerleader for the Neptunes. It was during that time that she met her husband Nelson Munsey, who played for the Neptunes from 1969 until his 1972 draft to the Baltimore Colts.

The Neptunes folded along with most of the rest of the ACFL after the 1971 season. Professional football would not return to the Hampton Roads region until the Virginia Destroyers arrived in 2011.
