= Baltimore Broncos =

Former Maryland, USA football team

- Founded: 1963
- Folded: 1966
- League: Atlantic Coast Football League
- Team history: Baltimore Broncos (1963); Hazelton Mustangs (1963–1964); Scranton Pros (1964); Scranton Miners (1965–1966)
- Based in: Baltimore, Maryland
- Arena: Westport Stadium

The Baltimore Broncos were a minor league American football team based in Baltimore, Maryland. They played just one season in the Atlantic Coast Football League (ACFL) in 1963 and played their home games at Westport Stadium. The Broncos were coached by head coach Joe Bartlinski, assistant coach Jesse Thomas, defensive coach Doug Eggers, and offensive backfield coach Lloyd Colteryahn.

The franchise relocated several times after its stint in Baltimore in 1963. In late 1963, the Broncos were relocated to Hazleton, Pennsylvania to become the Hazelton Mustangs. In late 1964, the franchise was relocated to Scranton, Pennsylvania to become the Scranton Pros. In 1965, the team became the Scranton Miners until folding in 1966.

== History ==
Before joining the ACFL in 1963, the Broncos spent two seasons in the Penn-Maryland football league. In its two seasons in the Penn-Maryland league, the Broncos dominated, losing only one game, going undefeated in 1961 and untied in 1962.

The Broncos only season in the ACFL was a struggle, posting a 2–10 regular season record and finishing 6th in the Southern Division.
