= Harrisburg Capitols =

Defunct American football team

- Founded: 1963
- Folded: 1969
- League: Atlantic Coast Football League
- Based in: Harrisburg, Pennsylvania
- Arena: Bishop McDevitt Field; Susquehanna High School Stadium; New Island Park

The Harrisburg Capitols were a minor league American football team based in Harrisburg, Pennsylvania. They played seven seasons in the Atlantic Coast Football League (ACFL) from 1963 to 1969 and played their home games at Bishop McDevitt Field, Susquehanna High School Stadium, and New Island Park.
