= Westchester Crusaders =

American football team, 1963–1964

- Founded: 1963
- Folded: 1964
- League: Atlantic Coast Football League
- Based in: Mount Vernon, New York
- Arena: Memorial Stadium

The Westchester Crusaders were a minor league American football team based in Mount Vernon, New York. They played two seasons in the Atlantic Coast Football League (ACFL) from 1963 to 1964 and played their home games at Memorial Stadium in Mount Vernon.

== History ==
The Crusaders played their first ACFL season in 1963, finishing with an 8-4 record under head coach Frank Bertino. In 1963, Tom Anthony led Westchester with nine touchdowns. Quarterback Sam Coppola recorded 12 touchdowns and 835 yards during the 1963 season.

1964 was Westchester's last season in the ACFL, finishing with a 3-10-1 record under head coach Frank Bertino. Johnnie Wardlaw was the season leader in touchdowns for the Crusaders with 12 touchdowns. Quarterback Chuck Zolak registered 955 yards and nine touchdowns during the season.
