= Marv Hubbard =

American football player (1946–2015)

No. 39, 44
- Position: Fullback

Personal information
- Born: May 7, 1946; Salamanca, New York, U.S.
- Died: May 4, 2015 (aged 68); Walnut Creek, California, U.S.
- Listed height: 6 ft 1 in (1.85 m)
- Listed weight: 225 lb (102 kg)

Career information
- High school: Randolph (Randolph, New York)
- College: Colgate (1965–1968)
- NFL draft: 1968: 11th round, 277th overall pick

Career history
- Oakland Raiders (1968)*; Denver Broncos (1968)*; Hartford Knights (1968); Oakland Raiders (1969–1976); Detroit Lions (1977)
- * Offseason or practice squad member only

Awards and highlights
- Super Bowl champion (XI); 3× Pro Bowl (1971–1973)

Career NFL statistics
- Rushing yards: 4,544
- Rushing average: 4.8
- Rushing touchdowns: 23
- Receptions: 85
- Receiving yards: 628
- Receiving touchdowns: 1
- Stats at Pro Football Reference

Marvin Ronald Hubbard (May 7, 1946 – May 4, 2015) was an American professional football fullback who played seven seasons in the National Football League (NFL), primarily for the Oakland Raiders.

He played college football for the Colgate Raiders and was selected in the 1968 common draft by the Oakland Raiders. Hubbard struggled to adjust in the American Football League (AFL), and was cut by both the Raiders and the Denver Broncos in preseason. He joined the Hartford Knights of the Atlantic Coast Football League (ACFL), where he led the league in rushing yards. He rejoined Oakland, and played in the AFL's final season, before it merged with the NFL. Injuries would eventually affect his career, and he missed parts of the 1975 season, as well as the entire 1976 season, in which the team won Super Bowl XI. He then played his final season in the NFL with the Detroit Lions. He was a three-time NFL All-Pro for the Raiders, and helped lead the team to four consecutive AFC Western Division titles from 1972 to 1975 and three consecutive AFC championship games from 1973 to 1975. Hubbard is ranked third in NFL history for highest yards per carry (4.82) for a fullback (behind only Hall of Fame fullbacks Jim Brown and Joe Perry), and is tied for 13th overall highest yards per carry in NFL history.

== Early life ==
Hubbard grew up in Red House, New York, the son of Marvin Hubbard Sr. and Susan Hubbard; residing in the hamlet of Bay State, Hubbard graduated high school shortly before the state forced most of the private property owners in the town to turn over their land, but he and his family were able to avoid losing their homes and he continued to own their family properties in the town until his death. He attended Randolph High School in rural Randolph, New York, near Jamestown. Following high school, Hubbard attended prep school at the New Hampton School.

== College career ==
Hubbard attended Colgate University in Hamilton, New York, where he was a member of the Lambda Chi Alpha fraternity. He lettered three years, leading the team in rushing in 1965 with 665 yards and 1966 with 893 yards, at the time the second-highest total in Colgate history. In 1966, he was 13th in the nation in rushing and scored 88 points, sixth-highest in the nation. He ended his career as the school's second-leading rusher with 1,887 yards and 22 touchdowns. He graduated in 1968.

In 1995, Hubbard was inducted into the Colgate University Athletic Hall of Honor.

== Professional career ==
Hubbard was selected in the eleventh round by the Oakland Raiders in the 1968 common draft. He was released in preseason cuts due to an initial inability to adjust to the professional game. He met the same fate with the Denver Broncos, before signing with the Hartford Knights of the Atlantic Coast Football League (ACFL). Despite not being the team's full-time running back, he still led the league in rushing yards, just ahead of his tandem partner, journeyman Mel Meeks. After Hubbard's success with the Knights, the Raiders exercised a reserve clause in his previous contract and signed him to their active roster.

Hubbard was quick for his size, and powerfully built. Famous for his aggressive style, he was a fan favorite of the John Madden-led Raiders in the early to mid 1970s. In an interview with the Contra Costa Times, Madden stated: "Marv Hubbard was one of the toughest players we ever had. There are people that will have contact and people that won't have contact, but only a few that will have it and really enjoy it. Marv was one of those guys who truly enjoyed the collision. He would look for it."

Hubbard averaged 4.82 yards per carry during his professional career, which ranks third all time for an NFL fullback (behind only Pro Football Hall of Fame fullbacks Jim Brown and Joe Perry) and is tied for 13th for all-time top yards per carry for any player in NFL history. His career yards per carry average was higher than many of the games legendary running backs, including Walter Payton, O. J. Simpson, Eric Dickerson, Emmitt Smith and Marshall Faulk.

Hubbard was a standout for the Raiders from 1971 to 1974 and part of 1975, and gave Oakland's fearsome air attack a balanced running threat. He helped lead the Raiders team to four consecutive AFC Western Division titles from 1972 to 1975 and three consecutive AFC Conference Championship Finals from 1973 to 1975. Hubbard led the Raiders in rushing four straight seasons from 1971 to 1974, and averaged over 1,000 total yards from scrimmage in each. He gained 1,100 yards rushing during the 1972 season, becoming the Raiders then all-time single season rushing leader. He rushed for a total of 4,544 rushing yards, 3,755 of which came during his four full-time years from 1971 to 1974. Hubbard was named to the NFL's AFC Pro Bowl Team in 1971, 1972 and 1973.

Hubbard scored 24 touchdowns (23 rushing, 1 passing) during his career, six of which were against his favorite opponent, the formidable Kansas City Chiefs. Hubbard was featured on the cover of Sports Illustrated on December 17, 1973, after the Raiders won a pivotal game over the division rival Chiefs. Hubbard kept an enlarged graphic of that magazine cover in his office throughout his post-football career. He was also an effective pass receiver coming out of the backfield, and caught 85 passes for 624 total yards, averaged 7.4 yards per reception. According to Madden, he also used Hubbard on kick-off and punt return teams where "Marv turned from a fullback into a linebacker".

Multiple shoulder injuries sidelined him for part of 1975, and Hubbard spent all of the 1976 season on injured reserve. He received a Super Bowl ring for being a team member of the 1976 Raiders, who won Super Bowl XI. In 1977, he signed with the Detroit Lions, where he saw reduced play, and then retired. Hubbard also sustained, in the words of his wife, "more concussions than you could count" during his playing career.

== NFL career statistics ==
Legend
	Won the Super Bowl
**Bold**	Career high

=== Regular season ===
Year	Team	Games		Rushing					Receiving				
Year	Team	GP	GS	Att	Yds	Avg	Lng	TD	Rec	Yds	Avg	Lng	TD
1969	OAK	14	0	21	119	**5.7**	18	0	2	30	**15.0**	20	0
1970	OAK	13	0	51	246	4.8	15	1	–	–	–	–	–
1971	OAK	14	11	181	867	4.8	20	5	**22**	**167**	7.6	**31**	**1**
1972	OAK	14	14	**219**	**1,100**	5.0	39	4	**22**	103	4.7	21	0
1973	OAK	14	14	193	903	4.7	50	**6**	15	116	7.7	25	0
1974	OAK	14	13	188	865	4.6	32	4	11	95	8.6	15	0
1975	OAK	7	6	60	294	4.9	**53**	2	7	81	11.6	16	0
1976	OAK	Did not play due to injury											
1977	DET	13	1	38	150	3.9	16	1	6	36	6.0	9	0
Career		103	59	951	4,544	4.8	53	23	85	628	7.4	31	1

=== Postseason ===
Year	Team	Games		Rushing					Receiving				
Year	Team	GP	GS	Att	Yds	Avg	Lng	TD	Rec	Yds	Avg	Lng	TD
1969	OAK	2	0	6	19	3.2	5	1	1	**33**	**33.0**	**33**	0
1970	OAK	2	0	21	70	3.3	9	0	1	5	5.0	5	0
1972	OAK	1	1	14	44	3.1	10	0	1	2	2.0	2	0
1973	OAK	2	2	**30**	**145**	**4.8**	**20**	**2**	**3**	28	9.3	17	0
1974	OAK	2	2	21	61	2.9	7	0	1	9	9.0	9	0
1975	OAK	2	2	22	63	2.9	8	0	–	–	–	–	–
Career		11	7	114	402	3.5	20	3	7	77	11.0	33	0

== Personal life ==
Marv was a country musician and songwriter for a brief period after football, and released the single "Fullbacks Ain't Supposed to Cry" in 1978. He co-wrote "(We've Got To) Win This One", a motivational song co-produced and released as a single by Hoyt Axton in 1981, on Axton's own Jeremiah Records label. He also released the tracks "Legend in His Own Mind/Country Boogie" in 2009. Hubbard went on to become a computer programmer, working for some of the insurance companies in Hartford, Connecticut.

Hubbard loved to golf and frequently donated his time and autographed memorabilia to charity celebrity tournaments. In 1975, Hubbard and Sal Bando, a third baseman for the Oakland Athletics, won the American Airlines Golf Classic, which featured pro football and baseball stars as partners, in Palm Springs, California.

On September 27, 2003, Hubbard was involved in a car accident in Castro Valley, California, in which the driver of the other car was killed. In 2004, Hubbard pleaded no contest to misdemeanor DUI. The driver who died had been making an illegal turn in a "blind spot" on an isolated section of road.

Hubbard died on May 4, 2015, just three days shy of his 69th birthday, from complications of prostate cancer. Hubbard had a wife of 49 years, two children, and five grandchildren. At the time of his death, he lived in Northern California and still owned the family properties in Red House.

Hubbard was posthumously inducted into the Greater Buffalo Sports Hall of Fame in 2018.

== See also ==
- Other American Football League players, coaches, and contributors
