= Portland Sea Hawks =

American football team, 1962–1964

- Founded: 1962
- Folded: 1964
- League: Atlantic Coast Football League
- Based in: Portland, Maine
- Arena: Portland High School Stadium

The Portland Sea Hawks were a semi-professional American football team based in Portland, Maine. They played three seasons in the Atlantic Coast Football League (ACFL) from 1962 to 1964 and played their home games at Portland High School Stadium, now Fitzpatrick Stadium.

== History ==
In July 1960, Neil "Ziggy" Serpico, then head coach of the Biddeford High School football team, was named the first head coach of the team.

The Sea Hawks began play in the ACFL in 1962 coached by Vushin Amerigan, finishing with a 5-5 record. Running back Willie Greenlaw led Portland with eight touchdowns during the 1962 season. Quarterback Butch Songin was the leader for the Sea Hawks in passing touchdowns with five.

In 1963, the Sea Hawks coached by Jim Flanagan finished with a 4-8 record. Dick Daniels led Portland in touchdowns with nine touchdowns, Willie Greenlaw was second on the team with five. Jackie Moynihan was the Sea Hawks' quarterback and recorded 860 yard and 7 touchdowns during the 1963 season.

In the team's final season in the ACFL in 1964, the Sea Hawks went 5-8-1 under head coach Chuck Fuccillo. Hugh Rohrschneider led Portland in scoring with 12 touchdowns on the season. Manch Wheeler was the team's starting quarterback, amassing 1343 yards and 12 touchdowns during the 1964 season.
