= Boston Sweepers =

Former Massachusetts, USA football team

- Founded: 1963
- Folded: 1964
- League: Atlantic Coast Football League
- Based in: Everett, Massachusetts
- Arena: Everett Memorial Stadium
- Owner: Ted Baron

The Boston Sweepers was a team in the Atlantic Coast Football League. They played their home games at the Everett Memorial Stadium in Everett, Massachusetts. The team was owned by Ted Baron, who also owned a local trash disposal container company, hence the team name "sweepers".

== History ==
The team played from 1962 to 1964 in Boston before moving to New Bedford, Massachusetts, and becoming the New Bedford Sweepers. The New Bedford Sweepers folded after the 1966 season. The Sweepers won two championships in the ACFL, in 1964 and 1965.

== Coaches and players ==
The offensive coach was Ed "Butch" Songin, and the defensive coach Rommie Loudd, both of whom were the head coaches of the team. Both coaches had played professional football with several teams, including the Boston Patriots of the American Football League which later changed its name to the New England Patriots. In 1966 Loudd became the first black assistant coach in the American Football League.

Some of the players for the Sweepers were Quarterback Don Allard, Wide Receivers Rick Sapienza and Gary Farina and Running Back Dom Gentile from South Boston who later tried out with the Boston Patriots, but was passed over for the 1960 Heisman Trophy winner Joe Bellino from Navy. The place kicker was Booth Lusteg who later went on to an NFL career with the Buffalo Bills, Green Bay Packers and Miami Dolphins.
