= Hartford Charter Oaks =

Defunct American football team

- Founded: 1964
- Folded: 1968
- League: Atlantic Coast Football League; Continental Football League
- Based in: Hartford, Connecticut
- Arena: Dillon Stadium
- Championships: 0

The Hartford Charter Oaks were a professional American football team based in Hartford, Connecticut. They began play in 1964 as a member of the Atlantic Coast Football League, replacing the Ansonia Black Knights. In 1965 the Charter Oaks were one of several ACFL franchises to join the new Continental Football League, where they finished in last place in their division.

Jerry Fishman, notorious for his unsportsmanlike behavior in the 1964 Maryland-Navy game, played his lone full professional season with the Charter Oaks in 1965.

After cancelling a few games in 1967 due to financial difficulty, the Charter Oaks announced they were ceasing operations in March 1968. The team cited losses of approximately $250,000. The Atlantic Coast Football League immediately established the Hartford Knights to replace the Charter Oaks in the market, and by at least one player's account (that of eventual Pro Bowl fullback Marv Hubbard), the Knights were still known as the Charter Oaks for at least their first season. The Knights would play for the next six seasons, winning the ACFL title in 1968, appearing in but losing the title games every year from 1969 to 1971, and winning the Seaboard Football League in 1972.

== Season-by-season ==
	Year	League	W	L	T	Finish	Coach
Hartford Charter Oaks	1964	Atlantic Coast Football League	8	5	1	3rd, Northern Division	Fred Wallner
Hartford Charter Oaks	1965	Continental Football League	2	12	0	6th, Western Division	Fred Wallner / Lee Grosscup / Lowell Lander
Hartford Charter Oaks	1966	Continental Football League	6	8	0	4th, Eastern Division	Lowell Lander
Hartford Charter Oaks	1967	Continental Football League	5	7	0	2nd, Atlantic North Division	Ken Carpenter
