= Hartford Knights =

Defunct American football team

- Founded: 1968
- Folded: 1973
- League: Atlantic Coast Football League; Seaboard Football League
- Based in: Hartford, Connecticut
- Arena: Dillon Stadium
- Championships: 1968, 1972
- Affiliation: Buffalo Bills

The Hartford Knights were a professional American football team based in Hartford, Connecticut. They began play in 1968 as a member of the Atlantic Coast Football League, replacing the Hartford Charter Oaks. For the 1969 season, they became the affiliate for the Buffalo Bills of the American Football League. One of the best minor-league football teams of its era, the Knights never finished below second place in their league, won every division title they contested, and had a winning record every season they played (including a 17-win perfect season in 1972).

The Knights' most prominent alumnus was fullback Marv Hubbard, who played his first professional season with the team in 1968 before appearing in multiple Pro Bowls as a member of the Oakland Raiders. Other notable players included Manch Wheeler, the team's first starting quarterback who had previously played for the Bills; and Mel Meeks, a power-runner who was one of the league's best running backs.

== Season-by-season results ==
Year	League	W	L	T	Finish	Head coach	Res.
1968	Atlantic Coast Football League	15	1	0	1st	Fred Wallner	
1969	ACFL	13	3	0	2nd	Fred Wallner	
1970	ACFL	8	6	0	2nd	Fred Wallner	
1971	ACFL	9	3	0	2nd	Fred Wallner	
1972	Seaboard Football League	17	0	0	1st	Nick Cutro	
1973	ACFL	8	4	0	2nd	Nick Cutro	
