= Bridgeport Jets =

Defunct American football team

- Founded: 1966
- Folded: 1974
- League: Atlantic Coast Football League; Seaboard Football League
- Team history: Waterbury Orbits (1966-1968); Bridgeport Jets (1968-1974)
- Based in: Bridgeport, Connecticut
- Arena: John F. Kennedy Stadium
- Championships: 0

The Bridgeport Jets were a minor league American football team based in Bridgeport, Connecticut. They began play in the Atlantic Coast Football League in 1966 as the Waterbury Orbits. The Orbits, already officially affiliated with the New York Jets of the American Football League, became the Bridgeport Jets in 1968. After relocating from Waterbury, the Jets played their homes games in John F. Kennedy Stadium.

== History ==
The Jets were founded in 1966 and owned by Fiore Francis “Hi-Ho” D’Addario. The “Hi-Ho” commonly used on Jets program covers alludes to D’Addario’s nickname.

In the 1980’s after the folding of the Jets, D’Addario became the primary sponsor of the Connecticut Brakettes, a women’s softball team who were known as the Hi-Ho Brakettes during his time as sponsor.

The ACFL suspended operations for the 1972 season after losing several franchises. While the Jets did not dissolve they were inactive for the year. They returned as part of a six-team ACFL in 1973 and enjoyed their most successful season. They finished atop their division with an 11–1 record and faced the New England Colonials in the league championship game, which they lost 41–17. It turned out to be the final game for the ACFL, which folded soon after.

The Jets moved to the Seaboard Football League in 1974, and advanced to their second league title game in a row. Once again they lost, this time 20–9 to the Wilkes-Barre Bullets. Both the Jets and Bullets were the only teams in the league to complete their seasons. With the cessation of the Seaboard Football League, the Jets' franchise ended.

== Season-by-season ==
	Year	League	W	L	T	Finish	Coach
Waterbury Orbits	1966	Atlantic Coast Football League	8	3	1	2nd, Northern Division	Fred Wallner
Waterbury Orbits	1967	Atlantic Coast Football League	6	6	0	2nd, Northern Division	Nick Cutro
Bridgeport Jets	1968	Atlantic Coast Football League	6	5	1	2nd, Northern Division	Nick Cutro
Bridgeport Jets	1969	Atlantic Coast Football League	7	5	0	2nd, Northern Division	Ray Mathews
Bridgeport Jets	1970	Atlantic Coast Football League	7	5	0	3rd, Northern Division	Ray Mathews
Bridgeport Jets	1971	Atlantic Coast Football League	4	8	0	3rd, Northern Division	Ray Mathews
Bridgeport Jets	1973	Atlantic Coast Football League	11	1	0	1st, Southern Division	Ray Mathews
Bridgeport Jets	1974	Seaboard Football League	6	3	0	N/A	Ray Mathews
