= Atlantic Coast Football League =

Minor American football league

- Sport: American football
- Founded: 1962
- Folded: 1973
- No. of teams: 6
- Countries: United States
- Last champion: New England Colonials
- Most titles: Virginia Sailors and Pottstown Firebirds (2)

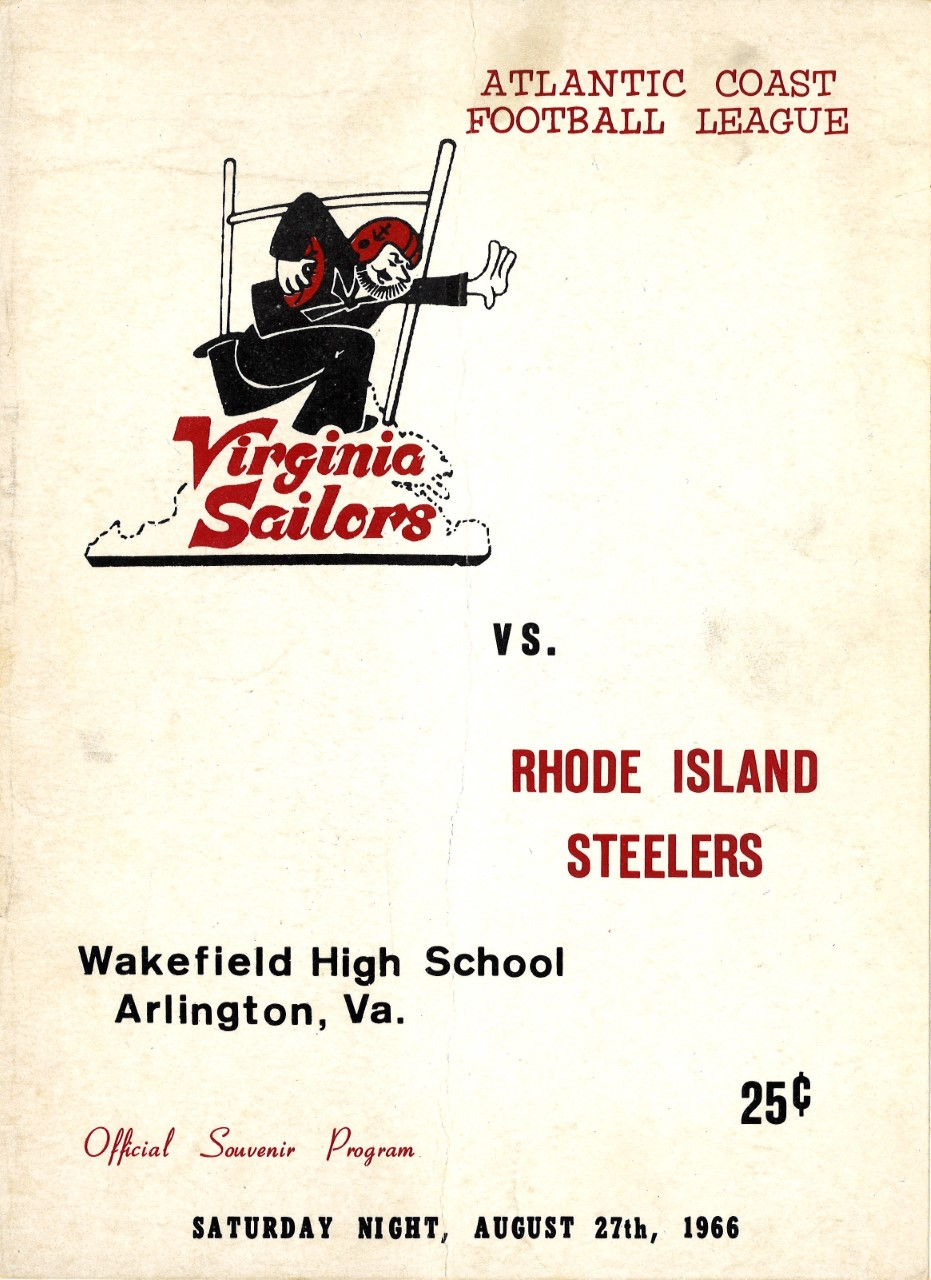
1966 game program

The Atlantic Coast Football League (ACFL) was a professional American football minor league that operated from 1962 to 1973. Until 1969, many of its franchises had working agreements with National Football League (NFL) and American Football League (AFL) teams to serve as farm clubs. The league paid a base salary of $100 per game and had 36 players on each active roster.

== History ==
For the first few years, Joe Rosentover served as league president. He had served in the same capacity for the American Football League (formerly the American Association) from 1947 to 1950; a relative, John Rosentover, had run the league from 1936 to 1947. In fact, several of the teams from the AA were revived in the ACFL, including the Providence Steam Roller, Newark Bears and a team in Paterson, New Jersey. By 1968, Rosentover had left the organization and been superseded by commissioner Cosmo Iacavazzi.

In 1965, three of the franchises (the Hartford Charter Oaks, Newark Bears and Springfield Acorns) joined with five teams from the United Football League to create the Continental Football League. The league picked up four franchises from that league when it folded in 1969 (Norfolk Neptunes, Orlando Panthers, Jersey Jays and Indianapolis Capitols); the Neptunes and Panthers were exactly the same teams as the Acorns and Bears respectively, having relocated during their time in the CoFL.

In 1970, the Orlando Panthers signed a husband and wife duo, Steven and Patricia Palinkas, as a kicker and holder respectively. Steven did not make the team, but Patricia did, making her the first female professional football player. Other notable ACFL players included Pro Bowl fullback Marvin Hubbard, league leading running back Mel Meeks, kicker Booth Lusteg, three-time championship winning quarterback Jim "The King" Corcoran, eventual 11-year NFL veteran Bob Tucker, and offensive lineman Paul "Dr. Z" Zimmermann, who shortly after his retirement began an over 40-year career as a sportswriter, much of that time with Sports Illustrated. Hall of Fame running back Steve Van Buren coached in the league from its launch through 1966. One of the most unusual players in league history was DB Kiyo "Doc" Tashiro, a practicing doctor and Harvard alum, who was the oldest player to play in a pro football league when he retired after 1964 season at the age of 47 (his record was later broke by George Blanda in 1975). He played for Newark Bears and Mohawk Valley Falcons from 1962 to 1964.

Most of the ACFL's teams, including all of the teams that had been in the Continental League, folded following the 1971 season. The Hartford Knights and Bridgeport Jets survived, and both moved down to the Seaboard Football League in 1972. Hartford accrued a perfect season in that league in 1972, including several games with margins of victory over 40 points, and after much dissatisfaction with the league announced it was leaving with the intent to reform the ACFL. The ACFL returned for one final season in 1973 with Hartford, Bridgeport, and several teams promoted up from the SFL (which led to a trickle-up that brought Empire Football League teams upward to the SFL to fill the old SFL teams' void). The return, however, was short-lived; the league determined it would not compete with the World Football League and folded after the 1973 season.

Commissioner Cosmo Iacovazzi was inducted into the American Football Association's Semi Pro Football Hall of Fame in 1987.

== Team list ==
- Ansonia Black Knights (1962–1963)
- Atlanta Spartans (1964)
- Atlantic City Senators (1966)
- Baltimore Broncos (1963)
- Boston Steamrollers (1965)
- Boston Sweepers (1963–1964)
- Bridgeport Jets (1968–1971, 1973) (affiliated with New York Jets in 1969)
- Frankfort Falcons (1962)
- Harrisburg Capitol-Colts (1968–1969) (affiliated with Baltimore Colts in 1969)
- Harrisburg Capitols (1963–1967)
- Hartford Charter Oaks (1964)
- Hartford Knights (1968–1971, 1973) (affiliated with Buffalo Bills in 1969)
- Holyoke Bombers (1965)
- Indianapolis Capitols (1970)
- Jersey Giants (1963–1964)
- Jersey Jays (1970)
- Jersey Jets (1965–1966)
- Jersey Tigers (1970)
- Long Island Bulls (1969–1970) (affiliated with New York Giants in 1969)
- Long Island Chiefs (1973)
- Lowell Giants (1966–1968) (affiliated with Boston Patriots in 1969)
- Mohawk Valley Falcons (1963–1965)
- New Bedford Sweepers (1965–1966)
- New England Colonials (1973) (affiliated with New England Patriots)
- New York Crusaders (1973)
- Newark Bears (1963–1964)
- Norfolk Neptunes (1970–1971)
- Orlando Panthers (1970)
- Paterson Miners (1962)
- Pittsburgh Valley Ironmen (1963–1965)
- Portland Sea Hawks (1962–1964)
- Pottstown Firebirds (1968–1970) (affiliated with Philadelphia Eagles in 1969)
- Providence Steamroller (1962–1964)
- Quincy Giants (1969)
- Rhode Island Steelers (1966)
- Richmond Rebels (1964)
- Richmond Roadrunners 1968–1969 (affiliated with New Orleans Saints in 1969–70)
- Richmond Saints (1970)
- Roanoke Buckskins (1969–1971) (affiliated with Washington Redskins from 1966 to 1969)
- Scranton Miners (1965–1966)
- Scranton Pros (1964)
- Springfield Acorns (1963–1964)
- Stamford Golden Bears (1962)
- Virginia Sailors (1966–1968)
- Waterbury Orbits (1966–1967) (affiliated with New York Jets in 1969)
- Western Massachusetts Pioneers (1973)
- Westchester Bulls (1967–1968)
- Westchester Crusaders (1963–1964)
- Wilmington Clippers/Renegades (1966–1967)

== Championship games ==
- 1962: Paterson Miners 17, Providence Steam Roller 14 (2OT)
- 1963: Newark Bears 23, Springfield Acorns 6
- 1964: Boston Sweepers 14, Newark Bears 10
- 1965: New Bedford Sweepers 13, Jersey Jets 9
- 1966: Virginia Sailors 42, Lowell Giants 10
- 1967: Virginia Sailors 20, Westchester Bulls 14
- 1968: Hartford Knights 30, Virginia Sailors 17
- 1969: Pottstown Firebirds 20, Hartford Knights 0
- 1970: Pottstown Firebirds 31, Hartford Knights 0
- 1971: Norfolk Neptunes 24, Hartford Knights 13
- 1973: New England Colonials 41, Bridgeport Jets 17

== Season standings ==
=== 1962 ===
W = Wins, L = Losses, T = Ties

Atlantic Coast Football League
Team	W	L	T
Paterson Miners	8	1	0
Providence Steam Roller	8	1	1
Portland Sea Hawks	5	5	0
Ansonia Black Knights	4	5	1
Stamford Golden Bears	2	7	0
Frankfort Falcons	1	9	0

=== 1963 ===
W = Wins, L = Losses, T = Ties

Atlantic Coast Football League Northern Division
Team	W	L	T
Springfield Acorns	7	5	0
Providence Steam Roller	6	6	0
Mohawk Valley Falcons	5	7	0
Ansonia Black Knights	4	8	0
Portland Sea Hawks	4	8	0
Boston Nu-Way Sweepers	2	9	1

Atlantic Coast Football League Southern Division
Team	W	L	T
Newark Bears	11	1	0
Harrisburg Capitols	8	3	1
Jersey Giants	8	4	0
Westchester Crusaders	8	4	0
Pittsburgh Valley Ironmen	6	6	0
Baltimore Broncos/Hazelton Mustangs	2	10	0

=== 1964 ===
W = Wins, L = Losses, T = Ties

Atlantic Coast Football League Northern Division
Team	W	L	T
Boston Nu-Way Sweepers	11	3	0
Springfield Acorns	9	5	0
Hartford Charter Oaks	8	5	1
Providence Steam Roller	8	5	1
Portland Sea Hawks	5	8	1
Westchester Crusaders	3	10	1
Mohawk Valley Falcons	2	12	0

Atlantic Coast Football League Southern Division
Team	W	L	T
Newark Bears	12	1	1
Jersey Giants	11	3	0
Pittsburgh Valley Ironmen	8	5	0
Richmond Rebels	8	5	1
Atlanta Spartans	4	9	0
Harrisburg Capitols	4	10	0
Baltimore Broncos/Hazelton Mustangs	1	13	0

== All-Stars ==
=== 1964 ===
- Quarterback - Tommy Wade, Pittsburgh
- Halfback - Mike Hagler, Newark
- Fullback - Mel Meeks, Springfield
- Tight End - Hugh Rohrschneider, Portland
- Flanker - Jim Winston, Jersey
- Split End - Junior Powell, Richmond
- Tackle - Nick DeFelice, Hartford
- Tackle - Joe Jackson, Newark
- Guard - Paul D'Allesandro, Providence
- Center - Richie Walsh, Newark
- Defensive End - Riley Morris, Boston
- Defensive End - Jim Toon, Jersey
- Defensive Tackle - Kieran Sheehan, Boston
- Defensive Tackle - Tony DeLuca, Westchester
- Corner linebacker - Bob Walsh, Newark
- Corner linebacker - Edward Versprille, Richmond
- Middle linebacker - Tom Gunderman, Newark
- Safety - Bob Balderston, Newark
- Safety - Frank Bernadowski, Pittsburgh
- Cornerback - Tom Hennessey, Boston
- Cornerback - Jimmy Adams, Providence
