= Richard Riendeau =

American football player and coach (1932–2015)

Biographical details
- Born: September 22, 1932; Springfield, Massachusetts, U.S.
- Died: September 20, 2015 (aged 82); East Greenbush, New York, U.S.

Playing career
- 1950–1953: Springfield

Coaching career (HC unless noted)
- 1958–1962: St Lawrence (freshmen)
- 1963–1972: RPI
- 1973: Albany Metro Mallers
- 1975–1977: Oberlin

Head coaching record
- Overall: 26–77–2 (college)

Richard P. Riendeau (September 22, 1932 – September 20, 2015) was an American football player and coach. He served as the head football coach at Rensselaer Polytechnic Institute in Troy, New York from 1963 to 1972. After serving as the coach of the semi-professional Albany Metro Mallers of the Seaboard Football League, he returned to the college ranks as the head football coach at Oberlin College in Oberlin, Ohio from 1975 to 1978.

== Head coaching record ==
=== College ===
Year	Team	Overall	Conference	Standing	Bowl/playoffs
RPI Engineers (NCAA College Division independent) (1963–1964)
1963	RPI	0–6			
1964	RPI	0–6–1			
RPI Engineers (Independent College Athletic Conference) (1965–1972)
1965	RPI	1–6	0–2	5th	
1966	RPI	5–4	1–1	3rd	
1967	RPI	4–4	1–1	3rd	
1968	RPI	2–7	1–1	T–2nd	
1969	RPI	1–7–1	0–3	4th	
1970	RPI	2–7	1–2	3rd	
1970	RPI	4–5	1–2	T–2nd	
1970	RPI	1–8	0–3	6th	
RPI:		20–60–2	5–15		
Oberlin Yeomen (Ohio Athletic Conference) (1975–1977)
1975	Oberlin	2–4	0–0	N/A	
1976	Oberlin	2–6	0–0	N/A	
1977	Oberlin	2–7	0–0	N/A	
Oberlin:		6–17	0–0		
Total:		26–77–2			
