= Sports in upstate New York =

Overview article

Upstate New York is a storied region in North American athletics.

Upstate New York has a large community centered around a variety of sports, in all seasons.

== Sports ==
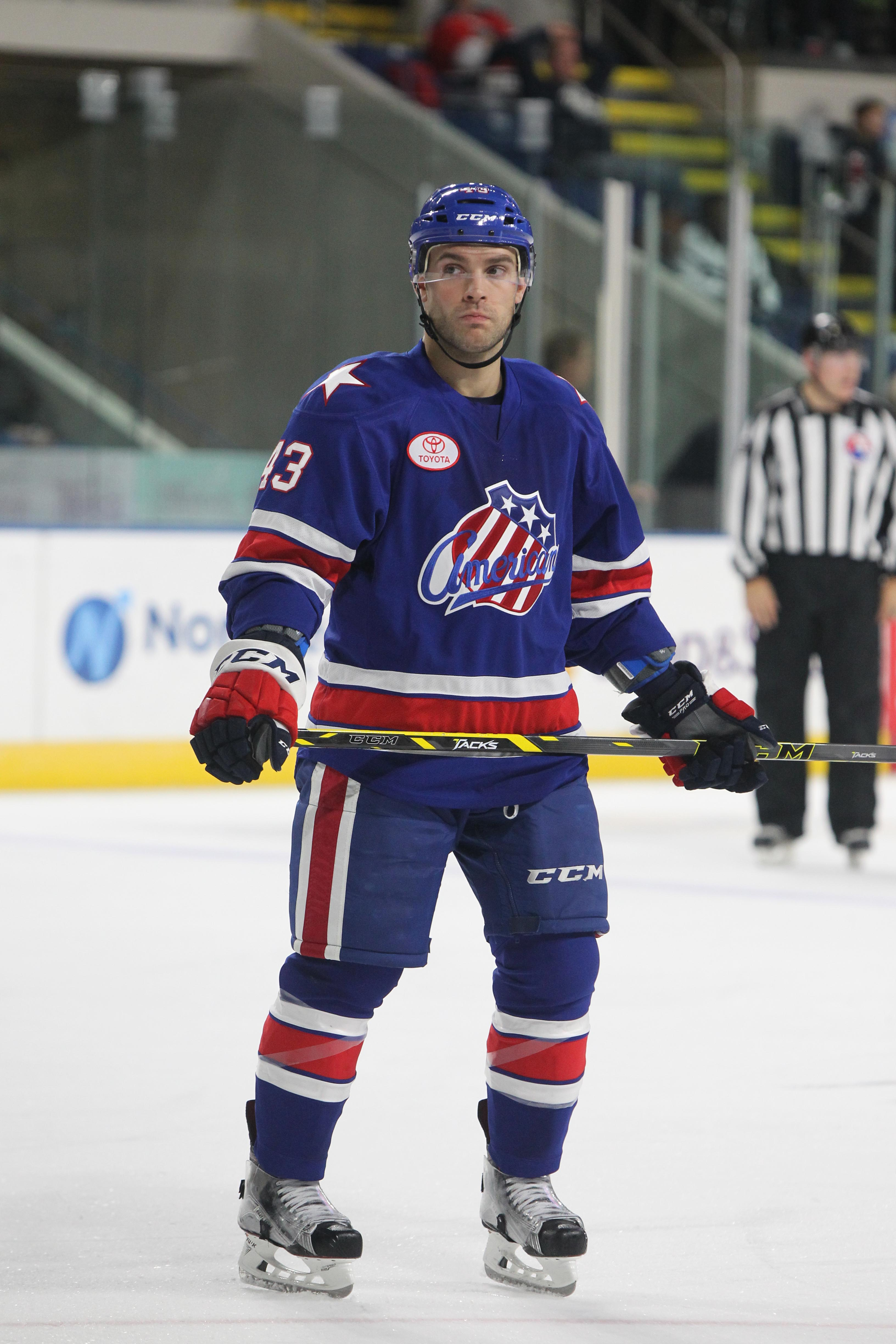
Daniel Catenacci of the Rochester Americans

=== Hockey ===
Ice hockey is a fairly large part of culture in Upstate New York. This is due in part to upstate having strong cultural ties to Canada, and Southern Ontario. Binghamton, New York was branded Hockeytown in the mid-1970s. The city of Buffalo, New York also has been branded as "hockey town", due to the large presence of the game in the area. Although certain areas of upstate may have larger followings of the sport than others, it is present all over the state.

It is played by many at the youth and high school level. Junior hockey also is present in the region, particularly the USPHL & OHL.

It is also played by many at the collegiate level, with NCAA D1, D2, and D3 ice hockey teams in the region. SUNYAC houses several college ice hockey powerhouses, including the Oswego Lakers and Plattsburgh Cardinals, who share a heated rivalry. Additionally, the ACHA has a large presence in Upstate New York. Many teams play in the Upstate New York Club Hockey League.

Professionally, ice hockey has a large presence in Upstate New York. Aside from the Buffalo Sabres of the National Hockey League, the Rochester Americans of the American Hockey League are located in Rochester, New York. The AHL has a long history throughout upstate. Other professional leagues such as the ECHL and Federal Prospects Hockey League have a presence in upstate.

=== Lacrosse ===
The sport of lacrosse is largely present in Upstate New York. Much of this is due to the long history of Native Americans in Upstate New York with lacrosse being a Native American game. Known as "the creators game", it is a growing game throughout the region. Syracuse, New York is known nationally as a lacrosse hotbed.

Like hockey, upstate and its presence of lacrosse was also influenced by the cultural connections with Canada where the game is one of Canada's national sports.

While field lacrosse is played at the youth, high school, and collegiate level - it is not the only form of the game played. Box lacrosse is also played, and the NLL's Buffalo Bandits are located in Buffalo, New York.

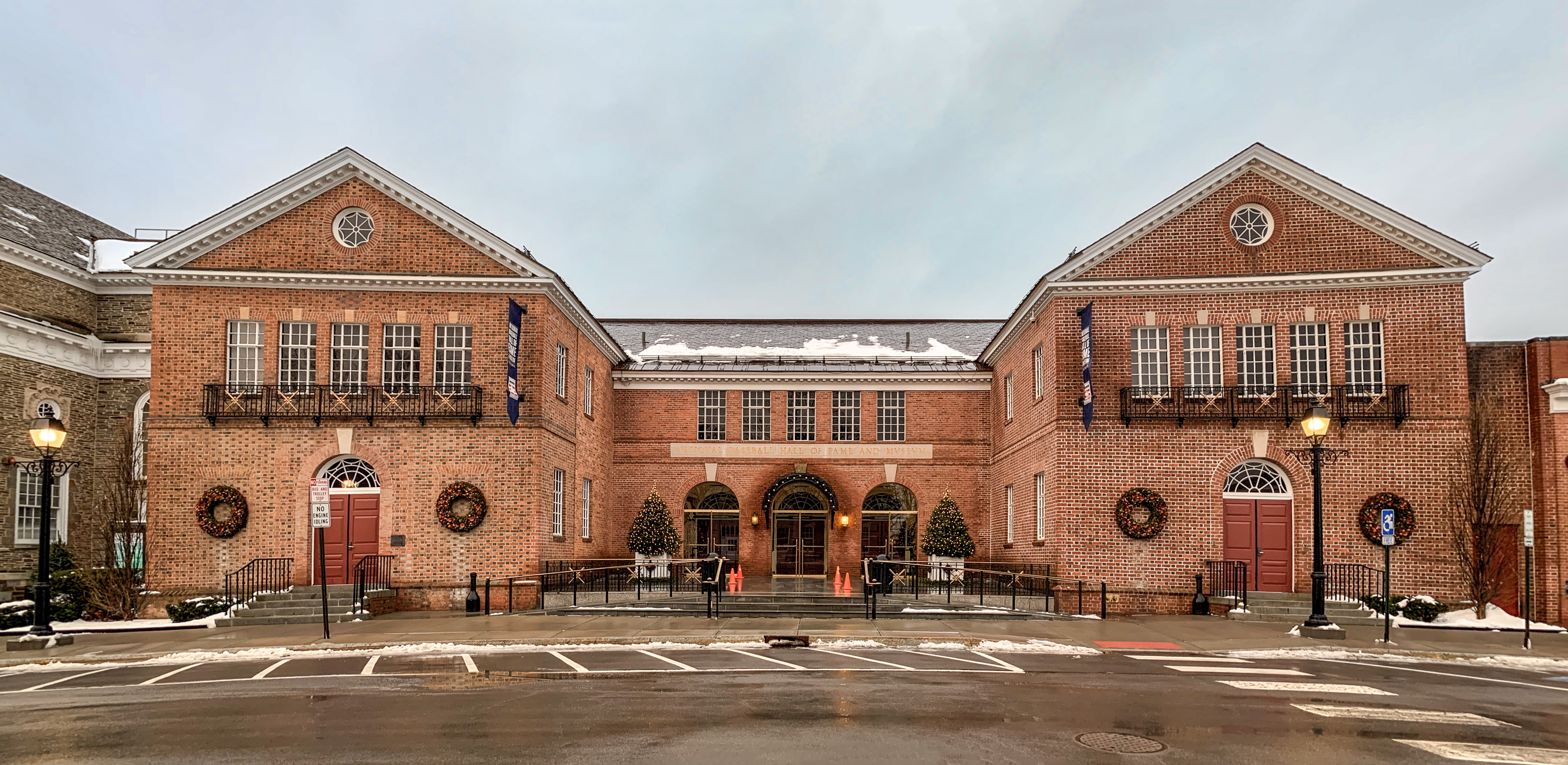
National Baseball Hall of Fame and Museum, located in Cooperstown

=== Baseball ===
The report of the 1905-1907 Mills Commission, charged with investigating the origins of baseball, named Cooperstown, New York as the place where baseball was invented in the 1830s or 1840s by Abner Doubleday. Cooperstown is the home of the National Baseball Hall of Fame and Museum.

Baseball is played across the state at the youth, high school, and collegiate level.

=== Basketball ===
The first away game in the sport of basketball was played at the Albany YMCA gymnasium in 1892, the year after the sport was invented in nearby Springfield College in Massachusetts.

=== Football ===
The New York Pro Football League was an informal circuit of teams based in various cities across Upstate New York.

The NYPFL would compete primarily in local circuits before participating in what is believed to be the first playoff tournament in professional football, which culminated in a Thanksgiving championship at Buffalo Baseball Park. The NYPFL was one of several regional leagues that foreshadowed the formation of the National Football League.

As of 2023, the only professional football team in the territory is the Buffalo Bills of the NFL. Although the region has hosted indoor football teams in the past, no teams currently play in the region.

=== Auto racing ===
In auto racing, Watkins Glen International Speedway is the major race track in the area and hosts annual races in the NASCAR Cup Series and Xfinity Series as well as the IMSA WeatherTech SportsCar Championship and the Sports Car Club of America.

Holland Speedway in Holland hosts races in the Whelen All-American Series. In addition, numerous smaller speedways and dirt tracks exist in Little Valley, Freedom, Humphrey, Granby, Oswego, Lancaster, Ransomville and numerous other cities and towns.

== Professional, collegiate & native athletics ==
=== Notable minor league teams ===
Upstate is no stranger to minor league sports. Rochester, New York as one example is home to several minor league sports teams, such as the AHL's Rochester Americans, and baseball's Rochester Red Wings.

Other Upstate New York minor league professional sports teams include:

- Syracuse Mets of the Triple-A baseball International League
- Binghamton Rumble Ponies of the Double-A baseball Eastern League
- Binghamton Black Bears of the Federal Prospects Hockey League
- Elmira River Sharks of the Federal Prospects Hockey League
- Syracuse Crunch of the American Hockey League
- Adirondack Thunder of the ECHL
- Albany Patroons of the Continental Basketball Association
- Auburn Doubledays of the Perfect Game Collegiate Baseball League
- Tri-City ValleyCats of the Frontier League
- Batavia Muckdogs of the Class A baseball New York–Penn League

The Perfect Game Collegiate Baseball League and New York Collegiate Baseball League operate within Upstate New York.

=== Major league teams ===
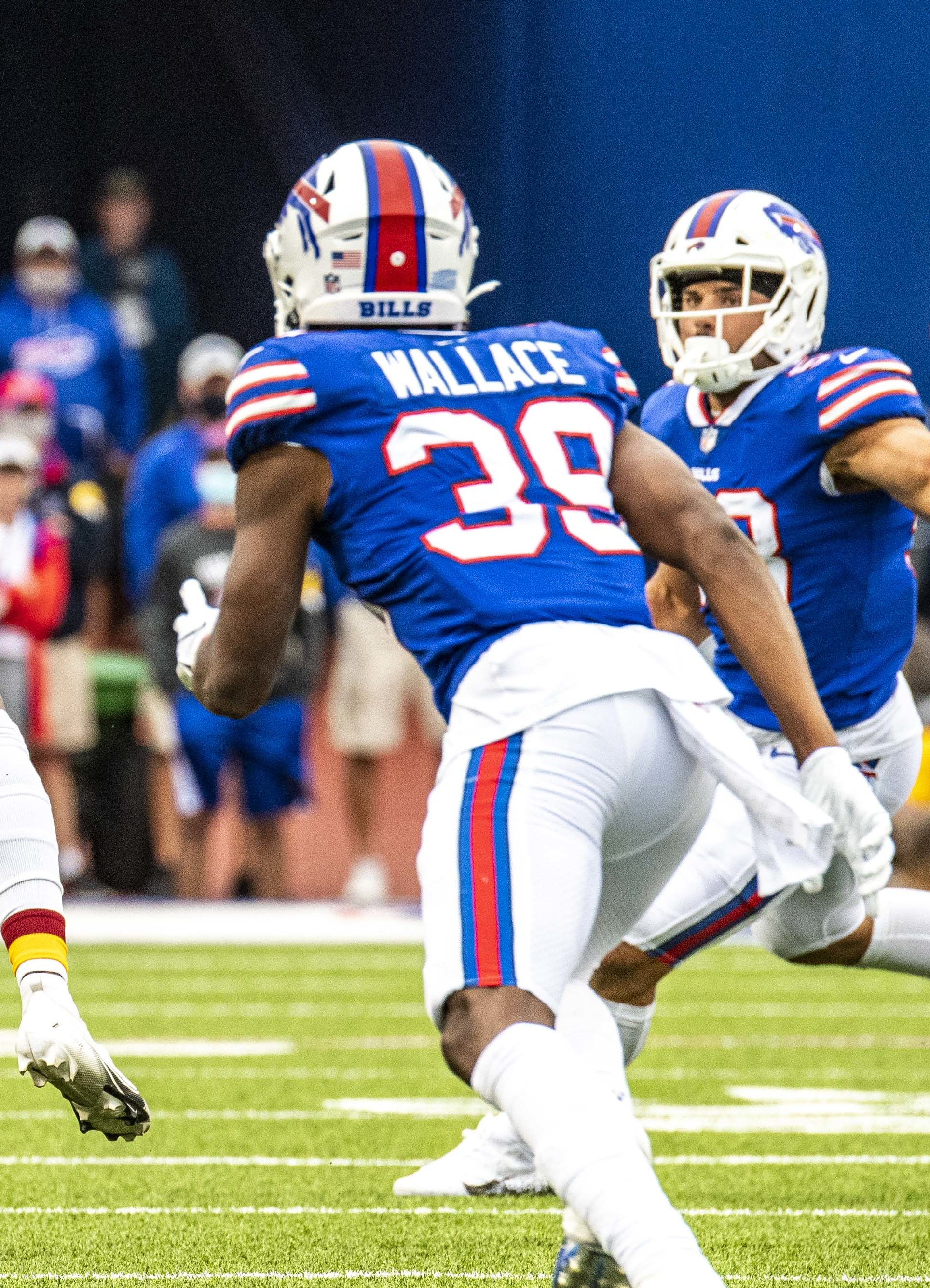
Levi Wallace of the Buffalo Bills

Upstate New York was formerly the home to major league sports teams such as:

- Troy Trojans of the National League (baseball)
- Syracuse Stars of the National League (baseball)
- Buffalo Braves of the National Basketball Association
- Rochester Royals of the National Basketball Association
- Syracuse Nationals of the National Basketball Association
- Buffalo Blues of the Federal League

Currently in 2023, the only teams in North America's major leagues that call Upstate New York home are:

- Buffalo Bills of the National Football League
- Buffalo Sabres of the National Hockey League
- Buffalo Beauts of the National Women's Hockey League
- Buffalo Bandits of the National Lacrosse League

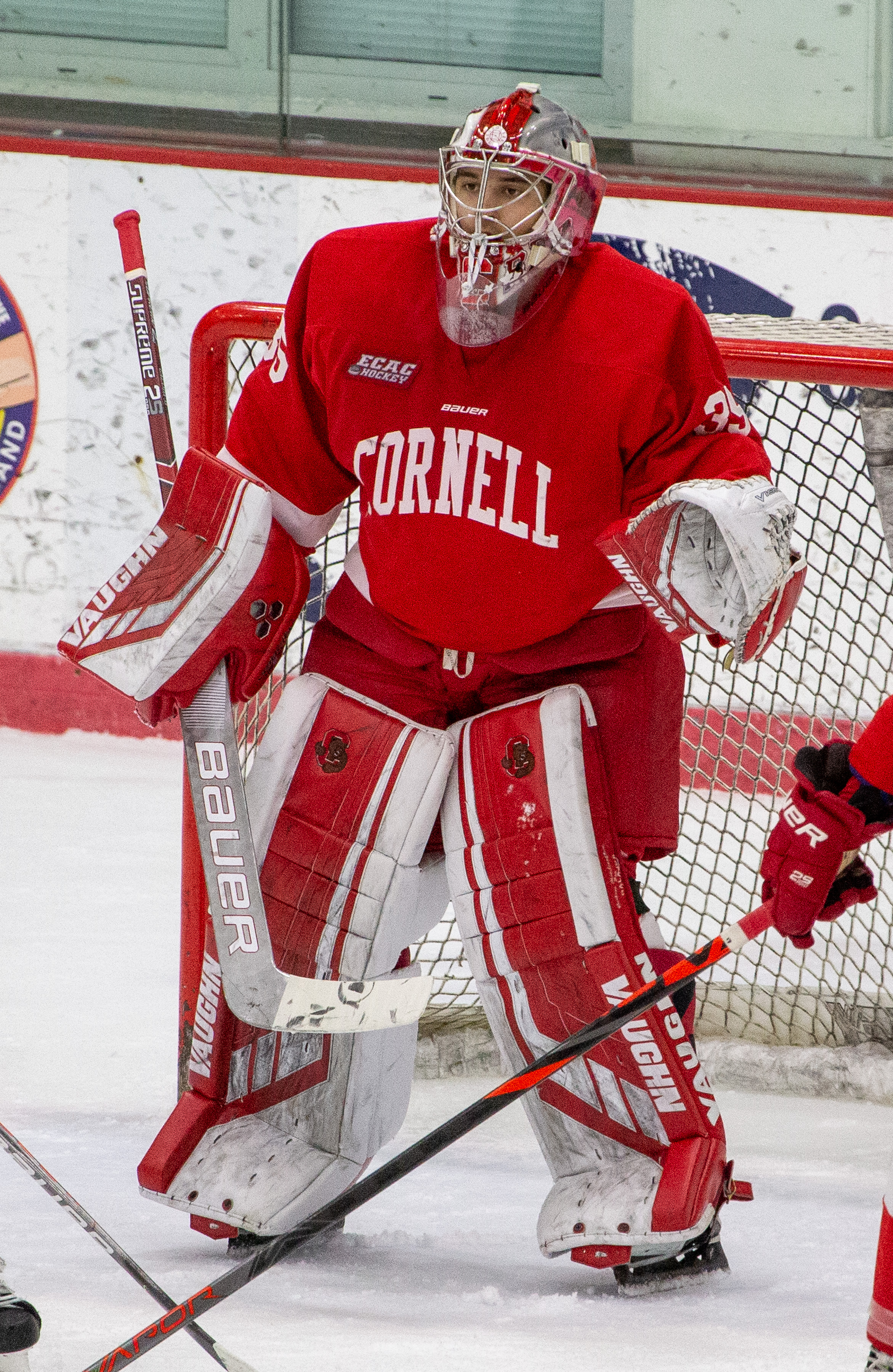
Matthew Galajda of Cornell University's NCAA D1 ice hockey program

=== Collegiate athletics ===
Numerous SUNY and private colleges call Upstate New York home. Cornell University's Big Red intercollegiate sports program is known for their NCAA D1 prestigious hockey program in Ithaca, New York, while Syracuse University's Syracuse Orange intercollegiate sports program in Syracuse, New York is known for its notable NCAA D1 basketball team.

In Western New York, the UB Bulls are the most widely known college football team, while in basketball, the regional "Big 4" rivalry between UB, the Canisius Golden Griffins, the Niagara Purple Eagles and St. Bonaventure Bonnies takes prominence.

Siena University, located in Loudonville, New York, saw its men's basketball team advance to the second round of the last NCAA tournaments of the 2000s decade by upsetting power conference teams—first Vanderbilt as a 13-seed in 2008, and Ohio State as a 9-seed in 2009. The St. Bonaventure women's basketball team reached the Sweet 16 of the 2012 NCAA Division I women's basketball tournament, and the Buffalo Bulls women's basketball team reach the Sweet 16 of the 2018 NCAA D1 Women's Basketball Tournament.

Upstate New York's numerous SUNY colleges compete in the State University of New York Athletic Conference. Most recently, the Le Moyne Dolphins representing Le Moyne College in Syracuse, began a transition from NCAA Division II to Division I in 2023 as the newest member of the Northeast Conference (now officially known as NEC). Le Moyne's men's basketball team has a storied history. Playing as a Division II/small college team, they had 64 wins over Division I/major programs between 1950 and 1977.

=== Native American athletics ===
The First Nations Lacrosse Association organizes the Iroquois Nationals (men) and Haudenosaunee Nationals (women), which are the national lacrosse teams of the Six Nations of the Iroquois Confederacy that competes in international competition. It represents the Iroquois reservations in the United States, the Grand River reservation in Ontario and the Seven Nations in Quebec. The team was admitted to the International Lacrosse Federation (ILF), since superseded by the Federation of International Lacrosse (FIL), in 1990 and is the only Native American/First Nations team sanctioned to compete in any sport internationally.

== Athletes ==
- Billy Backus - boxer from Canastota, New York.
- Carmen Basilio - boxer from Canastota, New York.
- Dustin Brown - NHL player from Ithaca, New York.
- Jehuu Caulcrick - NFL fullback from Clymer, New York.
- Funny Cide - the first horse from New York State to win the Kentucky Derby.
- Laura Diaz - LPGA golfer from Scotia, New York.
- Jimmer Fredette - former NBA player and current US national 3x3 basketball player; from Glens Falls, New York.
- Tim Green - professional American football player from Liverpool, New York. Green also played for Syracuse University.
- Walter Hagen - early American golfer, holds 11 majors, 3rd behind Jack Nicklaus and Tiger Woods. Hagen is from Rochester, New York.
- Baby Joe Mesi - heavyweight boxing contender from Tonawanda, New York.
- Matt Morris - professional baseball player, from Montgomery, New York.
- Joe Nathan - professional baseball player, from Pine Bush, New York.
- Jason Motte - professional baseball player, from Montgomery, New York.
- Dottie Pepper - LPGA golfer from Saratoga Springs, New York.
- Andy Van Slyke - professional baseball player from Utica, New York.
- Abby Wambach - longtime USA national soccer team member and the all-time leading goal scorer in international soccer for either sex; born and raised in Rochester, New York.
- Wayne Levi - professional golfer from Herkimer, New York.
- Miles Joseph - professional soccer player from Clifton Park, New York.
- Brendan Harris - professional baseball player from Glens Falls, New York.
- Tim Stauffer - professional baseball player from Saratoga, New York.
- Johnny Podres - professional baseball player from Port Henry, New York.
- Ernie Davis, 1961 Heisman Trophy Winner from Elmira, New York.
- Patrick Kane - NHL player from Buffalo, New York.
- Jim Duggan – professional wrestler from Glen Falls, New York.
- Don Savage - professional basketball player from Manlius, New York.
- Jim Deshaies - professional baseball player from Massena, New York.
- Erik Cole - NHL player from Oswego, New York.

== Athletic events ==
- The "Miracle on Ice"
- The 1932 Winter Olympics and the 1980 Winter Olympics, both held at Lake Placid
- The Tour de New York bicycle race
- The Boilermaker Road Race in Utica
- The inaugural NHL Winter Classic, held in Buffalo in 2008

== Athletic leagues ==
- Empire Football League, which houses the oldest surviving semi-professional football club in the United States, the Watertown Red & Black, founded in 1896.
- Liberty League
- Mid-State Athletic Conference
- New York Pro Football League
- Upstate New York Club Hockey League

== See also ==
- Sports in New York (state)
- Sports in Buffalo
- Sports in New York's Capital District
- Sports in Rochester
- Sports in Syracuse
