= Sports in New York's Capital District =

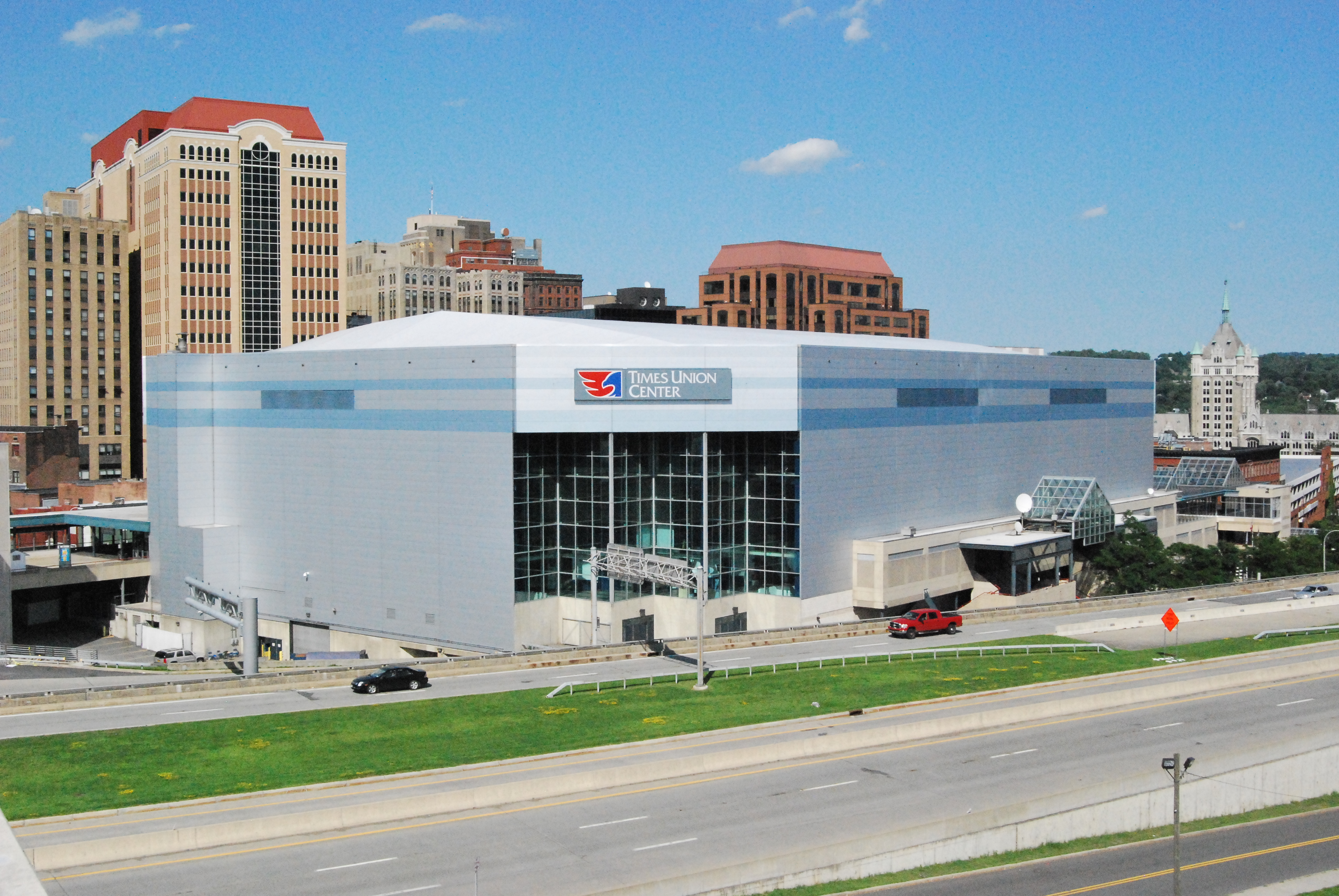
The MVP Arena in Albany, the largest sporting and concert venue in the Capital District

Sports in New York's Capital District are very popular, and there is a long history of professional teams and college athletics.

The "major league" sport of the region is thoroughbred horse racing at the Saratoga Race Course, which has been held annually since 1863 with only a few breaks. The Saratoga Race Course is the oldest racetrack in the US, and possibly the oldest sporting venue of any kind in the country. The Saratoga meet runs for 40 racing days beginning in July and ending on Labor Day, and includes fifteen grade I stakes races. The Travers Stakes, America's "Midsummer Derby" is the highlight of the meet; winners include Man o' War, Whirlaway, Native Dancer, Sword Dancer, Alydar, and Birdstone.

According to legend, the game of baseball was invented by Abner Doubleday of Ballston Spa. The Troy Trojans were a Major League Baseball team in the National League for four seasons from 1879 to 1882. In 1883 the New York Gothams, later the New York and San Francisco Giants, took the Trojans place in the National League. Nearly half of the original Gotham players had been members of the Trojans. Many other Major League ballplayers have had their start at various levels in the Capital District, including former Tri-City ValleyCats' Jose Altuve, Dallas Keuchel, George Springer, Ben Zobrist, and Hunter Pence. Others include Derek Jeter and Mariano Rivera of the New York Yankees who once played for the Albany-Colonie Yankees.

NBA head coach of the Los Angeles Lakers, Phil Jackson, won his first championship ring when he guided the Albany Patroons to the 1984 CBA championship. Three years later, the Patroons completed a 50–6 regular season, including winning all 28 of their home games; at that time, Denver Nuggets head coach George Karl was the Patroons' head coach. Future NBA stars Mario Elie and Vincent Askew were part of that season's squad. A third NBA head coach has roots in the Capital District as well, Pat Riley, most famous as the coach of the Los Angeles Lakers, but also of the New York Knicks and Miami Heat. Riley played for Linton High School in Schenectady, where he was also a football star. He also played on the Schenectady Little League Baseball team when in 1954 it won the Little League Baseball World Series.

Mike Tyson received his early training in the Capital District and his first professional fight was in Albany in 1985 and Tyson's first televised fight was in Troy in 1986. He fought professionally four times in Albany and twice each in Troy and Glens Falls between 1985 and 1986.

Since 1973, the AKRFC, has been promoting rugby and now includes a DII men's team, a DI women's team, and youth rugby all across the Capital Region. They play on Dick Green Field at 100 Frisbie Ave, Albany, named after the late Dick Green who suffered a heart attack while practicing at Lincoln Park.

Since 2002, The Tri-City ValleyCats have won three New York-Penn League titles, and have captured seven Stedler Division titles.

Since 1988, the Siena College men's basketball team (the Siena Saints) have appeared in six NCAA Tournaments (1989, 1999, 2002, 2008, 2009, 2010, and 2026).

Since 2005, the University at Albany Great Danes men's basketball team has appeared in five NCAA Tournaments (2006, 2007, 2013, 2014, and 2015).

The University at Albany Great Danes women's basketball team has made six consecutive NCAA Tournaments (2012, 2013, 2014, 2015, 2016, and 2017).

Roller derby leagues in the area include Albany's Albany All-Stars Roller Derby, Troy's Hellions of Troy Roller Derby. and Capital District Men's Roller Derby.

== Major professional teams ==
Team	Sport	League	Venue (capacity)	Established	Titles
New York Atlas	Field Lacrosse	PLL	Casey Stadium (8,500)	2024	0
Albany Firebirds	Arena Football	AF1	MVP Arena (14,236)	2024	0

== Current minor league teams ==
- 518 Ballers, American Basketball Association
- Adirondack Thunder, ECHL hockey team based in Glens Falls, New York (Not within the Albany metropolitan area)
- Albany Metro Mallers, semiprofessional football team that has regularly been in the national semipro playoffs and won the national semipro title in 2008, 2013, and 2016
- Albany Patroons, The Basketball League
- New York Phoenix, The Basketball League
- Tri-City ValleyCats, Joseph L. Bruno Stadium in Troy; formerly a member of Minor League Baseball's Single-A short season New York–Penn League, joined the independent Frontier League in 2021

== NCAA college athletic programs ==
- University at Albany Great Danes: Currently play at the Division I level in all of its sports, though for most of its history it was a Division III school, with a brief stay at the Division II level in the late 1990s. The football team is a member of the Division I FCS Colonial Athletic Association, and the women's golf team plays in the Metro Atlantic Athletic Conference (MAAC); all other sports teams play as members of the America East Conference. In 2006, UAlbany became the first SUNY affiliated school to send a team to the NCAA Division I men's basketball tournament. The men's lacrosse team has also made multiple appearances in its sport's NCAA Division I Championship Tournament, the first University at Albany team to do so. The men's track & field team has produced All-American athletes such as Gered Burns, Joe Greene, Marc Pallozzi, and Luke Schoen. UAlbany has hosted the New York Giants summer training camp since 1996.
- Siena College's Saints basketball team plays in the Times Union Center in downtown even though the college is located in the Albany suburb of Loudonville. The college teams play at the Division I level in all sports, although it discontinued its Division I-AA football program in 2003 (three years before I-AA adopted its current designation of FCS). Siena is a member of the MAAC in all sports that the school sponsors.
- Union College Garnet Chargers: Union participates in the National Collegiate Athletic Association (NCAA), the Liberty League, and ECAC. Men's and women's ice hockey compete at the NCAA Division I level; all other sports compete at the NCAA Division III level. Won NCAA Division I Men's Hockey National Championship in 2014.
- Rensselaer Polytechnic Institute (RPI) Engineers in Troy. RPI currently sponsors 23 sports, 21 of which compete at the NCAA Division III level in the Liberty League. Men's and women's ice hockey compete at the Division I level in ECAC Hockey. RPI won the NCAA Division I Men's Hockey National Championship in 1954 and 1985.
- The College of Saint Rose: The St. Rose Golden Knights play at the Division II level. St. Rose plays in the Northeast-10 Conference.
- Skidmore College Thoroughbreds: Skidmore in Saratoga Springs fields 19 Varsity teams in NCAA Division III. Skidmore is a member of the Liberty League.
- Albany Dutchmen: Formerly the Bennington Bombers of Bennington, Vermont team of the Perfect Game Collegiate Baseball League formerly the New York Collegiate Baseball League, it is an amateur league of collegiate players who are unpaid to retain NCAA eligibility, whereas college baseball uses aluminum bats this league uses wooden. They played at Bleecker Stadium until 2010 when they moved to the new Bellizzi Stadium.

The Dutchman's Shoes trophy is awarded to the winner of the annual college football game between the RPI Engineers and the Union College Garnet Chargers, the oldest football rivalry in New York.

== Other sports ==
- Head of the Fish is a rowing race held on the last weekend of October each year on Fish Creek in Saratoga County. The 2013 competition featured over 2,000 entries representing 160 clubs.
- Freihofer's Run for Women is an annual five-kilometer road running competition for women usually held in late May or early June in Albany. The race holds IAAF Silver Label Road Race status and had 5,000 participants in 2011.
- The Saratoga Polo Association, established in 1898, competes against the best polo teams in the world on Whitney Field in Greenfield. The season roughly corresponds to that of the Saratoga Race Course. The Whitney Cup is awarded annually. Spectators are encouraged to tailgate.

== Defunct professional teams ==
- Adirondack Flames (AHL affiliate of the Calgary Flames) moved from Glens Falls in 2015 after one season.
- Adirondack Phantoms were an American Hockey League (AHL) affiliate of the Philadelphia Flyers. The Phantoms played in Glens Falls from 2009 to 2014 before moving to Allentown, Pennsylvania.
- Adirondack Red Wings (American Hockey League) (1979–1999) planned a move for 2000 to Ohio, never materialized and franchise folded.
- Albany Alleycats were a professional soccer team that competed in the United Soccer Leagues from 1995 to 1999.
- Albany Attack entered the National Lacrosse League as an expansion team prior to the 1999–2000 season. The Attack played four years in Albany, which by far the most successful being the 2001–2002 season, when they made the league championship game. However, due to attendance problems, after the following season, the Attack moved to San Jose, California and became the San Jose Stealth.
- Albany Capitals American Soccer League and later American Professional Soccer League team played at Bleecker Stadium from 1989 to 1991.
- Albany Choppers (International Hockey League, 1990–91 season, folded February 1991)
- Albany-Colonie Diamond Dogs, played at Heritage Park in nearby Colonie beginning in 1995. In 1999, they captured the Northern League title but folded after the 2002 season due to financial difficulties and competition from the newly formed Tri-City ValleyCats.
- Albany-Colonie Yankees Eastern League baseball, AA affiliate of the New York Yankees from 1985 to 1993, playing host to several key players of the parent club's eventual late-1990s dominance.
  - Albany A's/Albany-Colonie A's (Eastern League affiliate of the Oakland Athletics in 1983 and 1984, superseded by the Albany-Colonie Yankees.)
- Albany Devils were the AHL affiliate of the New Jersey Devils from 2010 to 2017.
- Albany Eagles American Soccer League team, formerly the New York Eagles played at Bleecker Stadium from 1979 to 1981.
- Albany Empire were an Arena Football League team that played at the Times Union Center from 2018 to 2019
- Albany Empire were a National Arena League (NAL) team that played at the MVP Arena from 2021 to 2023, winning championships in 2021 and 2022. During a tumultuous season in 2023 in which Antonio Brown owned 95% of the team, the NAL suspended the Empire for non-payment of dues and fines.
- Albany Firebirds were an Arena Football League team in the Albany area that won the ArenaBowl in 1999, but moved to Indianapolis, Indiana after the 2000 season. The Firebirds folded in late 2004. In 2008, the af2's Albany Conquest were rebranded into the Albany Firebirds.
- Albany FireWolves were a National Lacrosse League (NLL) team that relocated to Albany from New England prior to the 2022 season. The FireWolves spent four seasons in Albany, with its most successful season coming in the 2024 season, when they made it to the NLL Finals. However, due to attendance problems and high costs after the following season, the FireWolves moved to Oshawa, Ontario prior to the 2026 season.
- Albany Patroons/Capital Region Pontiacs (original version from 1982 to 1993 was a dominant team in the league and a starting point for notable NBA coaches Phil Jackson and George Karl. The franchise moved to Hartford, Connecticut, then folded before being revived in 2005, then folding again in 2009.)
- Albany River Rats (American Hockey League) (1990–2010) Sold to Charlotte businessman. Moved to Charlotte, North Carolina, started play in 2010-11 season as the Charlotte Checkers.
- Albany Senators (Eastern League baseball, was a minor-league affiliate of the Boston Red Sox for a time in the 1950s.)
- Capital District Islanders (American Hockey League, forerunner to Albany River Rats when affiliated with the New York Islanders.)
- New York Buzz, World Team Tennis.
- New York Kick (American Indoor Soccer Association) the team split time between Albany and Glens Falls, New York so the team choose to be named after the state.
- Troy Uncle Sam's Trojans (Eastern Amateur Hockey League, 1952–53 season)
- Troy Slapshots (Atlantic Coast Hockey League, folded November 1986)

== Sports facilities ==
- The MVP Arena is an indoor arena in downtown Albany that can fit from 6,000 to 17,500 people, with a maximum seating capacity of 15,500, for sporting events.
- The Joseph L. Bruno Stadium, colloquially called "The Joe," is a baseball stadium located on the campus of Hudson Valley Community College in Troy, New York. It is the home field of the Tri-City ValleyCats and of the Hudson Valley "Vikings". The stadium has 4,500 seats and 10 luxury suites.
- The Christian Plumeri Sports Complex includes Bellizzi Stadium, a ballpark that is home to the "Golden Knights" of The College of Saint Rose and the Albany Dutchmen of the Perfect Game Collegiate Baseball League.
- The Houston Field House is a multi-purpose facility on the campus of the Rensselaer Polytechnic Institute in Troy. Home ice for the ECAC RPI "Engineers" hockey team, the Field House seats 4,780 for hockey games, the largest capacity in the ECAC.
- Glens Falls Civic Center is a 4,794-seat multi-purpose arena, located in downtown Glens Falls, New York, that currently (2013) serves as the home of the Adirondack Phantoms, of the American Hockey League.
- M&T Bank Center is a multi-purpose facility in Schenectady, New York. It is home to the Union College Garnet Chargers men's and women's ECAC ice hockey teams and has a seating capacity of 2,200 for hockey games.
- Bob Ford Field is an 8,500-seat football stadium on the uptown campus of the University at Albany.
- SEFCU Arena is a 4,538-seat multi-purpose arena on the uptown campus of the University at Albany which is home to the Albany Great Danes basketball teams and other sporting events.
- Bleecker Stadium, a 6,500 seat multi-purpose stadium in west Albany has hosted a variety of teams in various sports including a match between an American rugby team and the South African Springboks. Until 2012 Bleecker served as home field for the Albany Metro Mallers.
- Washington Avenue Armory, officially Washington Avenue Armory Sports and Convention Arena, is 3,600 seat multi-purpose arena that was the home of several college and professional basketball teams. From 1982 to 1990, as well as from 2005 to 2009, and from 2018 to the present, the Armory hosts the Albany Patroons basketball team.
- Heritage Park was a 5,500 seat baseball stadium in Colonie that has been home field for the A's, the Yankees, and the Diamond Dogs. It was demolished in 2009.
- Albany-Saratoga Speedway, dirt track auto racing in Malta, New York.

== Sports figures ==
Many sports figures have connections to the Capital District:

- Professional golfer Dottie Pepper was born and resides in Saratoga Springs.
- Abner Doubleday, reputedly the inventor of baseball, was born in Ballston Spa.
- Jimmer Fredette, former NBA player now playing in China, was born and raised in Glens Falls.
- Tim Stauffer, pitcher for the San Diego Padres, grew up and attended school in Saratoga Springs.
- Basketball player and coach Pat Riley grew up in Schenectady.
- Jason Morris, four-time Olympian in Judo, resides and has a judo center in Glenville.
- Scott Cherry, men's basketball coach at High Point University, is a native of Ballston Spa and a graduate of Saratoga Central Catholic High School.
- Hockey coach Ned Harkness coached RPI from 1950 to 1963, and Union College from 1975 to 1978.
- Hockey forward Adam Oates played for the RPI Engineers from 1982 to 1985.
- David Pietrusza, baseball historian, was born and raised in Amsterdam, New York and later resided in Scotia, New York.
- Bob Ford served as football coach of the Albany Great Danes from 1973 until his retirement in 2013. In 1999 he guided the Danes in their transition from Division III to Division I. Albany's current football stadium, inaugurated in 2013, is named for him.
- Cornelius Vanderbilt Whitney, a former part-time resident of Saratoga Springs, was three-time winner of the U.S. Open polo title.

== See also ==
- Athletics in Upstate New York
- Sports in New York
- Sports in Syracuse
