= Sports in New York =

Sports in New York may refer to:

- Sports in New York City
- Sports in New York (state)
