= Empire Football League =

Semi-professional American football league

- Empire Football League logo
- Sport: American football
- Founded: 1969
- Folded: 2022
- No. of teams: 5
- Country: United States
- Last champion: Watertown Red & Black (4)
- Website: Official Site

The Empire Football League (EFL) is a semi-professional American football league with franchises based primarily in New York State. The league was established in 1969 and last played in 2022. Many franchises have come and gone including in locations such as Pennsylvania, Vermont, and Connecticut as well as Quebec and Ontario in Canada.

== History ==
The league was organized during the winter of 1968 and started in 1969. The Hudson Falls Greenjackets were the first champions, after finishing with a 7–1 record. The Scranton Eagles won 10 championships in the 13 seasons between the years 1982 and 1994. The Eagles dynasty was the subject of the WVIA documentary The Forgotten Dynasty: Scranton Eagles Football in 2024.

Several members of the Syracuse 8 that challenged disparities for African Americans at Syracuse University's football program played for the Tri City Jets of Binghamton, New York. The team was a farm team for the New York Jets at the time and some of them went for a tryout with the Jets, but according to one of them they understood they had no chance when Jets coach Weeb Ewbank identified them as "those boys from Syracuse" during roll call.

Ray Seals transitioned from the EFL to the EFL's Syracuse Express to the Tampa Bay Buccaneers in the National Football League (NFL) in 1989. As a linebacker he blocked the pass from Brett Favre that Favre caught for his very first completion in the NFL.

Due to complications stemming from the Western Hemisphere Travel Initiative, all Canadian teams were removed from the league beginning in the 2010 season (at the time, the Quebec Titans and the Ottawa Deacon Demons (Joliet Chargers) were in the league).

The Watertown Red and Black left the league in 2017 when the EFL was down to two teams. The league held an emergency meeting when it was left with just the Seaway Valley Venom and the Glens Falls Greenjackets.

The Hudson Valley Mountaineers joined the league in 2018.

In 2018 Kevin Siska of the Glens Falls Greenjackets was inducted into the American Football Association Minor League Football Hall of Fame.

The team canceled its 2020 season amid the COVID-19 pandemic. For the 2021 season Utica, Hudson Valley and Sussex decided to join other leagues, so the league decided to split into 2 divisions to cut down on travel costs. Eastern Division included Glens Falls Greenjackets, Plattsburgh North Stars and Tri City Spartans, while the West Division consisted of Syracuse Smash, Watertown Red & Black and Northern New York Grizzlies. West division champs Watertown beat East division champs Glens Falls 37–8 in the final.

In 2022 Morgan Smith became the first female player in the Empire Football League, which she did as a placekicker for the Greenjackets.

In 2023 the league announced the Watertown Red & Black would be leaving the EFL and joining the GDFL; three of the other five teams followed suit, with the Greenjackets going to the New England Football League, the Smash (whom the league had suspended during the 2023 season after Smash players entered a fan melee that erupted at one of their home games and escalated into a gunfight in the parking lot) joining the East Coast Football League (later going indoors as an American Arena League member) and playing a spring schedule, and the Broome County Stallions rejoining the Northeastern Football Alliance, forcing the league to suspend operations for the 2023 season (after which the league, as of 2025, has yet to resume operations).

== Prior franchises ==
- Watertown Red & Black
- Albany Metro Mallers
- Amsterdam Zephyrs
- Berkshire Mountaineers
- Berwick Colts
- Binghamton Jets
- Broome County Dragons
- Capitaland Thunder
- Chenango Storm
- Connecticut Chiefs
- Dutchess County Checkmates
- Glens Falls Greenjackets
- Glove Cities Colonials
- Hudson Vikings (Columbia County)
- Hudson Falls Greenjackets
- Kingston Panthers
- Marlboro Shamrocks
- Massena Warriors
- Massena Silver and Black Raiders
- Montreal Condors
- Montreal Voyaguers
- New England Crusaders
- New York Stallions
- Newburgh Raiders
- Oneonta Indians
- Oneida Silver Bullets
- Orange County Bulldogs
- Ottawa Bootleggers
- Ottawa Demon Deacons
- Plattsburg Northstars (Lake City Stars)
- Quebec Titans
- Rochester Sting
- Rotterdam Eagles
- Reading Raptors
- Scranton Eagles
- Schenectady Chargers
- Seaway Valley Venom
- Salt City Aces
- Syracuse Vipers
- Syracuse Shock
- Syracuse Storm
- Syracuse Strong
- Triple Cities Jets
- St. Lawrence Trailblazers
- Toronto Raiders
- Troy Uncle Sammies
- Troy Giants
- Troy Titans
- Utica Mustangs
- Utica Nighthawks
- Utica Yardogs
- Vermont Ice Storm
- Vermont Muddogs (Casselton)

== Champions ==
Year	Champion team	Defeated team
1969	Hudson Falls Greenjackets	(no game)
1970	Triple Cities Jets	Hudson Vikings
1971	Lackawanna County Eagles (9–1–0)	Tri-Cities Jets (9–1–0), 26 to 13 (@ Scranton, 10/30/71)
1972	Tri-Cities Jets (10–0–0)	Lackawanna County Eagles (8–2–0) (@ Binghamton)
1973	Oneonta Indians	(no game)
1974	Glove Cities Colonials	(no game)
1975	Oneonta Indians	Albany Metro Mallers
1976	Hudson Falls Greenjackets	Albany Metro Mallers
1977	Troy Uncle Sammies	Glove Cities Colonials
1978	Troy Uncle Sammies	Hudson Falls Greenjackets
1979	Albany Metro Mallers	Troy Uncle Sammies
1980	Watertown Red & Black	Troy Uncle Sammies
1981	Binghamton Jets	Glens Falls Greenjackets
1982	Scranton Eagles	Glens Falls Greenjackets
1983	Scranton Eagles	Glens Falls Greenjackets
1984	Scranton Eagles	Glens Falls Greenjackets
1985	Syracuse Express	Glens Falls Greenjackets
1986	Scranton Eagles	Syracuse Express
1987	Scranton Eagles	Albany Metro Mallers
1988	Scranton Eagles	Ottawa Bootleggers
1989	Albany Metro Mallers	Scranton Eagles
1990	Scranton Eagles	Albany Metro Mallers
1991	Scranton Eagles	Montreal Voyaguers
1992	Newburgh Raiders	Scranton Eagles
1993	Newburgh Raiders	Scranton Eagles
1994	Scranton Eagles	Newburgh Raiders
1995	Newburgh Raiders 14	Syracuse Storm 9
1996	Newburgh Raiders 28	Columbia County Colts 0
1997	Broome County Jets 31	Capitaland Thunder 14
1998	Kingston Panthers 36	Connecticut Chiefs 14
1999	Scranton Eagles 28	Kingston Panthers 21
2000	Syracuse Vipers 31	Scranton Eagles 24
2001	Syracuse Vipers 24	Scranton Eagles 18
2002	Orange County Bulldogs 42	Glen Falls Greenjackets 13
2003	Glens Falls Greenjackets 30	Watertown Red & Black 6
2004	Glens Falls Greenjackets 17	Albany Metro Mallers 0
2005	Albany Metro Mallers 33	Orange County Bulldogs 0
2006	Albany Metro Mallers 39	Watertown Red & Black 0
2007	Vermont Ice Storm 9	Watertown Red & Black 8
2008	Quebec Titans 12	Vermont Ice Storm 10
2009	Watertown Red & Black 6	Plattsburgh North Stars 0
2010	Plattsburgh North Stars 13	Watertown Red & Black 10
2011	Albany 29	Syracuse Shock 14
2012	Rochester Sting 38	Plattsburgh North Stars 22
2013	Syracuse Shock 36	Plattsburgh North Stars 15
2014	Plattsburgh North Stars 6	Watertown Red & Black 0
2015	Syracuse Strong 14	Watertown Red & Black 6
2016	Syracuse Strong 36	Sussex Stags 13
2017	Glens Falls Greenjackets 56	Seaway Valley Venom 0
2018	Hudson Valley Mountaineers 41	Plattsburgh North Stars 30
2019	Tri City Spartans 12	Mohawk Valley NightHawks 0
2020	Canceled due to COVID-19 pandemic	
2021	Watertown Red & Black 37	Glens Falls Greenjackets 8
2022	Watertown Red & Black 30	Glens Falls Greenjackets 14
2023	Canceled due to a lack of teams	

== See also ==
- Seaboard Football League
- Atlantic Coast Football League
- Alliance of American Football
- Empire Football League Champions
