= Bill Ellenbogen =

American football player (born 1950)

No. 65
- Position: Guard / Offensive tackle

Personal information
- Born: December 8, 1950 (age 75); Glen Cove, New York, U.S.

Career information
- College: Buffalo (1969–1970); Virginia Tech (1971–1972)
- NFL draft: 1973: undrafted

Career history
- Kansas City Chiefs (1973)*; Albany Metro Mallers (1973); Houston Oilers (1974)*; Philadelphia Bell (1974); Washington Redskins (1975)*; Shreveport Steamer (1975); New York Giants (1976–1977); Toronto Argonauts (1978); Ottawa Rough Riders (1979)*; Winnipeg Blue Bombers (1979); Atlanta Falcons (1980)*
- * Offseason or practice squad member only

Career NFL statistics
- Games played: 23
- Games started: 2
- Stats at Pro Football Reference

William A. Ellenbogen (born December 8, 1950) is an American former professional football player who was an offensive lineman for the New York Giants of the National Football League (NFL) during the 1976 and 1977 seasons. He played college football for the Buffalo Bulls (1969–1970) and Virginia Tech (1971–1972). He also played professionally in the Seaboard Football League (1973), World Football League (1974–1975) and Canadian Football League (1978–1979).

== Early life ==
Ellenbogen was born in Glen Cove, New York, in 1950. He attended New Rochelle High School.

== College football ==
Ellenbogen played college football for the Buffalo Bulls football. He was a member of the 1969 and 1970 Buffalo Bulls teams that compiled records of 6–3 and 2–9 under head coach Bob Deming. He played at offensive tackle in 1969 and was moved to defensive end in 1970. When the University at Buffalo terminated its football program after the 1970 season, Ellenbogen transferred to Virginia Tech where he played at the defensive tackle position for the 1971 and 1972 teams that compiled records of 4–7 and 6–4–1 under head coach Charlie Coffey.

== Professional football ==
In 1973, Ellenbogen signed with the Kansas City Chiefs. During the 1973 preseason, the Chiefs used Ellenbogen as an offensive lineman. He was waived by the Chiefs in early September 1973, prior to the start of the regular season. After being waived by the Chiefs, he played semi-professionally for the Albany Metro Mallers of the Seaboard Football League as a defensive lineman, receiving $25 per game.

Ellenbogen was signed by the Houston Oilers in 1974. He also was selected by the Philadelphia Bell of the World Football League (WFL). He requested a release from the Oilers to join the Bell and played with them that season. He spent time with the Washington Redskins in 1975 but did not make the final roster, later returning to the WFL to play with the Shreveport Steamer before the league folded.

Ellenbogen played on the offensive line for the New York Giants during the 1976 and 1977 seasons when the clubs compiled records of 3–11 and 5–9. He appeared in 23 games for the Giants, two of them as a starter.

Ellenbogen was cut by the Giants prior to the 1978 season and signed with the Toronto Argonauts of the Canadian Football League. He played for the Argonauts for a portion of the 1978 season. As his playing career came to an end, The Buffalo News in November 1978 summarized his career as follows: "Pro football has been a bumpy road for Ellenbogen. He was never drafted and did not receive a cent of bonus money with his initial contract. A football nomad, he has played for eight teams in three leagues."

Ellenbogen had tryouts with the Ottawa Rough Riders and Winnipeg Blue Bombers in June and July 1979. He played three games for the Blue Bombers in the 1979 season. He also attempted a comeback with the Atlanta Falcons in 1980, but he was cut by the club in mid-August.

== Later life ==
After his football career ended, Ellenbogen operated a bar in Blacksburg, Virginia, known as Bogen's. He was also a developer involved in other business projects in Blacksburg.

Ellenbogen's daughter, Courtney Ellenbogen, was an amateur golfer at Duke.
