= Glens Falls Greenjackets =

Semi-professional American Football team

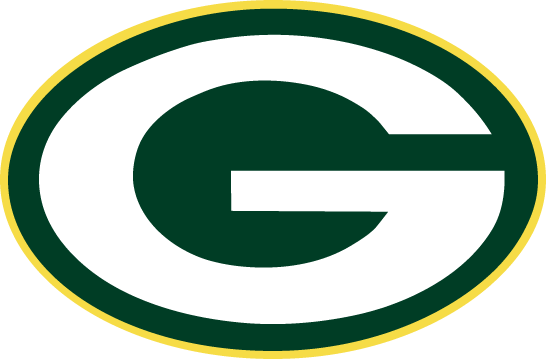
- Founded: 1928
- League: New England Football League (2023–Present)
- Team history: Hudson Falls Greenjackets (1928-;1936; 1940-1941; 1946-1952; 1962–1980); Glens Falls Greenjackets (1980–Present)
- Based in: Glens Falls, New York
- Stadium: East Field
- Colors: Green, Light Gold, White
- Owner: Hank Pelton
- Head coach: Steven Johnson
- Championships: 1949, 1951, 1969, 1976, 2003, 2004, 2017, 2023

The Glens Falls Greenjackets are a semi-professional American football team in Glens Falls, NY. The Greenjackets compete in the New England Football League. They were founded in 1928 as the Hudson Falls Greenjackets, making them the second oldest semi-pro American football team in the United States. Home games are played at local highschools in the Glens Falls, NY area. Preseason games are played at Putt LaMay Memorial Field (Glens Falls High School).

In their 96-year history, the Greenjackets have won four Empire Football League Championships, two Eastern Football League Championships, two North American Football League Championships, ten Empire Football League Division Championships, and most recently one New England Football League Championship. In February 2024, the Greenjackets played for then first time at the National level in Miami, Florida. Watertown Red & Black, the oldest American semi-pro team, is a longstanding rival of the Greenjackets, as both played in the Empire Football League until that league ceased play prior to 2023.

Players include high school and college graduates, athletes looking to take their career to higher levels (e.g. arena football, CFL, or NFL), and older adults still looking to participate in football. All members of the Greenjackets organization are volunteer. This includes players, coaches, trainers, front office staff, and the President/CEO Hank Pelton III. Despite not being paid, the Greenjackets' level of completion is still classified as semi-professional.

== History ==
=== Founding & Early Years (1928-1936) ===
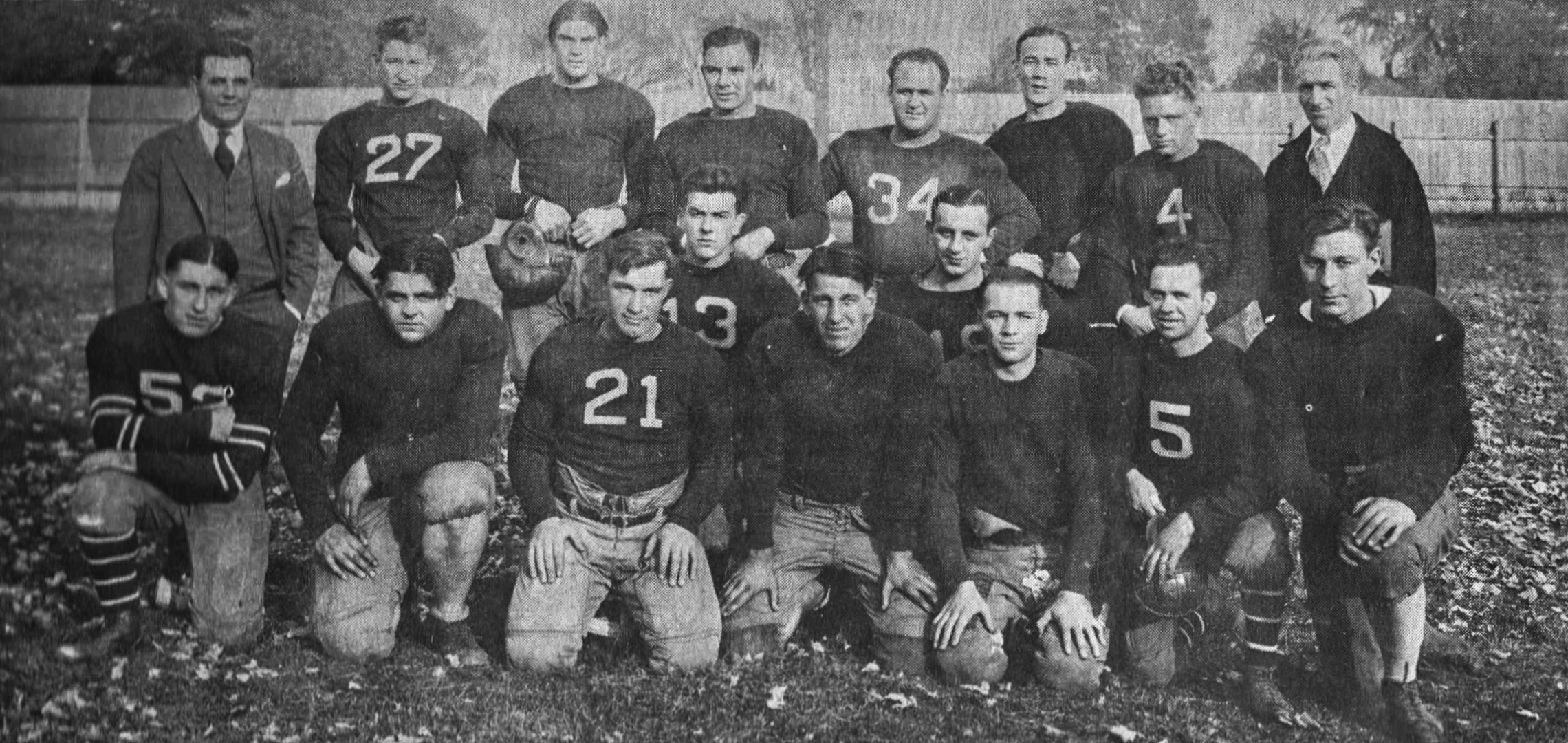
Team photo of the inaugural 1928 Hudson Falls Greenjackets at Derby Park

In 1928 the team was organized by three local businessmen in Hudson Falls, NY; William Angleson, Fred Burns and Dr. Francis D. Moynihan. Initial financial support came from local merchants and equipment was loaned by Hudson Falls High School and Whitehall Senior/Junior High School. According to the last-surviving 1928 teammate, guard Dick Carpenter, a contest was held to name the team and an unidentified little girl came up with “Greenjackets”, winning a season pass for the 1928 season. The cost of a 1928 general admission ticket was 35 cents a game.

The team's “G” logo is shared between the Greenjackets and the Green Bay Packers of the NFL. Hudson Falls joined the Eastern Football League along with the Albany Knickerbockers, Watervliet Mariners, Troy Bearcats, Saratoga Brown Bears, and Fort Ethan Allen. The first game was held on October 14, 1928 against Saratoga at Derby Park in Hudson Falls. They defeated the Brown Bears 2-0. The Greenjackets’ inaugural season finished with an 5-0-1 record against Albany.

=== Intermittent Era (1937-1969) ===
After nine seasons of play, operations temporarily ceased for three seasons in 1937-39. And with the breakout of World War II, the Greenjackets once again halted from playing from 1942 to 1945. After resuming play in 1946, Hudson Falls became Eastern Football League Champions in 1949 and 1951. But in 1952, the green and gold faced a new obstacle as the EFL disbanded. With no league to play in, the Greenjackets also disbanded until 1962. After a ten-year hiatus, a major change was needed for the Greenjackets to continue a football tradition in the Southern Adirondacks.

=== Empire Enlightenment (1969-1980) ===
In the spring of 1969, Greenjackets players were called together for a meeting and told that they would need to go out on their own if they wanted the team to continue playing. Under new leadership of President Dick Leland and Vice President Jim Willing, Greenjackets football would continue to thrive. In May 1969 a newly organized league, the Empire Football League, was incorporated in Poughkeepsie, NY. The original five-team league comprised the Hudson Falls Greenjackets, Dutchess County Checkmates (Poughkeepsie), Hudson Vikings, Cohoes Olympiads, and Troy Titans. The Greenjackets would go on to win the inaugural 1969 EFL championship. In addition to winning the Valley Division Championship in 1972 and another EFL title in 1976, Hudson Falls was a successful playoff team in the 1970s appearing six out of nine seasons (1969, 1972-1974,1976, 1977). The 1978 season was commemorative as it was the 50th Anniversary of the team and 10th anniversary of the league.

=== Move to Glens Falls & Multiple Championships (1980-1990) ===
With the opening of East Field in Glens Falls in 1980, the Greenjackets relocated and re-branded as the Glens Falls Greenjackets. The old Hudson Falls fan base easily coveted with Derby Park only being 3.5 miles away. With a new stadium came multiples victories. The Greenjackets were prosperous as five-time consecutive Northern Division Champions from 1981 to 1985.

=== Decade of Decline & First Departure from the EFL (1990-2000) ===
Glens Falls fell into a slump during the 1990s and did not produce any division or league championships. Glens Falls left the Empire Football League for the 1997 season to play in the New York Amateur Football League but returned the following season in 1998.

In 1998, the Greenjackets Hall of Fame was established to honor past players, coaches, and staff members that made significant contributions the Greenjackets. The inaugural class had 34 inductees; the largest class in the Hall of Fame's history.

=== Back-to-Back Championships & Second Departure from EFL (2000-2011) ===
The early to mid-2000s was a successful dynasty for the Greenjackets as they won three consecutive Northern Division Championships and back-to-back EFL Championships in 2003 and 2004. However, despite their success in the EFL, owner Charles Adams moved the team to the North American Football League in 2005. He was cited as having a desire to play "a stronger competition". In 2008, Hank Pelton III and Craig Matuszak purchased the team from a group headed by NAFL commissioner Rob Licopoli. Glens Falls won back-to-back Empire Division titles in 2008 and 2009.

=== Return to the EFL (2011-2022) ===
After spending six seasons with the NAFL, the Greenjackets made the decision to return to the Empire Football League in 2011 after a six-year hiatus. Since their return to the EFL in 2011, the Greenjackets have made the playoffs three times, losing in the semi-finals in 2015 and 2016, and winning the championship in 2017. In 2022 their placekicker Morgan Smith became the first female player in the Empire Football League. Glens Falls lost to Watertown in the Empire Football League Championship in each of the last two years they were in the EFL.

=== Joining the NEFL (2023-Present) ===
In 2023, with the EFL not playing their season that year, the Greenjackets joined the New England Football League. They played in the North Atlantic Division (AA), the highest division of the New England Football League.

The Greenjackets won the AA NEFL Championship in their first season. Glens Falls defeated the Middleboro Cobras, in overtime over the long-time NEFL powerhouse 12-6. It was the first league championship for the 'Jackets since 2017; Glens Falls had lost to Watertown in the Empire Football League final in each of the previous two years.

The NEFL Championship season led to their first national bowl appearance as an organization, where they were selected to play in the 2024 Summer/Fall National Championship Sunshine Bowl in Miami Florida. The Greenjackets traveled to Miami, FL to cap off a successful season against the Baltimore Rams on February 17, 2024.

== Logos & Uniforms ==
The Glens Falls Greenjackets primary logo is the same primary logo used by the Green Bay Packers.

== Championships ==
• Eastern Football League Champions: 1949, 1951

• Empire Football League Champions: 1969, 1976, 2003, 2004, 2017

• New England Football League, North Atlantic Division AA Champions: 2023

• Empire Football League Valley Division Champions: 1972

• Empire Football League Northern Division Champions: 1972, 1981, 1982, 1983, 1984, 1985, 2002, 2003, 2004

• North American Football League Empire Division Champions: 2008, 2009

== Hall of Fame ==
In 1998, the Greenjackets began a Hall of Fame to recognize players, coaches, and staff who made significant contributions to the team. The inaugural 1998 class had the largest number of inductees at 34. There were no Hall of Fame inductions in 1999, 2000, and 2004-2008.

To be eligible for induction into the Greenjackets Hall of Fame, an individual must have been either a player, coach, staff member, or volunteer for a minimum of 5 years.

Class of 1998:

Butch Archambault, Jim Baker, Jim Beatty, Bobby Bond, George Bourdeau, Jigger Canale*, Chuck Caputo, John Case, Frank DePalo, Ray Greenwood, Roy Greenwood, Terry Gorton, Sarge Harrington, John Jenkins, Dick Leland, Curt Leroy, Tom Loding, Pat Malan, Jeff Mann, John Martin, Thomas Marzola, John Millet, Joe Mitchell, Muff Nassivera, Rocco Persutti, Keith Potter, Joe Porter, Scott Newell, Pete Quackenbush, Dan Rivers, Tony Trello*, Tim Webb, Bob Wilkins, Jim Willig*

Class of 2001:

Sean Brand, Dick Carpenter*, Bob Collins, Bill Eggleston*, Nick DePalo*, Sam DePalo, Mert Evans*, Craig Harrington, P.J. Kelly, Jim Martin, Tom Martin, Bob Michelucci, Frank Moynihan*, Ozzie Osborne, Bob Pelkey, Scott Pratt, Mike Ross, Joe Ruby, Mike Santoro, Gary Saunders, Bob Seeley, Mike Simione, Rudy Stautner, Joe Valastro, Paul Vasko*

Class of 2002:

Chuck Colamaria, Bob Hickey, Mike Lentz, Dick Rosati*, Bob Young

Class of 2003:

Mary Adams*, Chuck Catalfamo, Tony Kaczkowski*, Tom Mayer, Dan Middleton, Marty Migliori, Brian Murphy, R.J. Phipps, Larry Spear

Class of 2009:

Harold Connelly, Bob Fish, Jon Gifford, Jim Guy, Jeff Higgins, John Jackowski, Sheree Lentz, Hank Pelton III, Mike Randall*, Tony Rossi, Steve Smith

Class of 2010:

Mike Burke, Harold Bull, George Fordrung*, Kelly Hopkins, Terry Hopkins, T.J. Ingalls*, Damon Walker, David Woods

Class of 2011:

Don Beatty, Joe Buonviaggio, John Godfrey, Ed Havens, Chris Nemec, Larry Pollic, Jeff Williams

Class of 2012:

Bob Gover, Kenny Hackett, Dave Simon*

Class of 2013:

Ray Bartholomew, Joe D’Angelico*, Tony “T-Bone” Green, John Rowan, Kevin Warren

Class of 2014:

Larry Alberts, Jeff Hodges, Claudia Hollenbeck, Dan McGovern, Dan McGuire, Jerry Murphy Tom Sullivan, Joe Volpe*, Mike Waldron

Class of 2015:

John Gossilin, Earl “Chief” McDuff, Christine Hollenbeck, Rick Rodriguez, Wendy Scott, Jack Toole, Bob Tucker, John Whittington*

Class of 2016:

Brian Walker, Pat Killian, Will “Wheelbarrow” Edwards, Jarris “Night Train” Jones, Brian Northern, Paul “Guam” Hollenbeck, Bob Frye, Dan VanWie, Craig Fawcett

(*denotes deceased)

== Media Coverage ==
The only media coverage comes from regional newspapers The Post Star and The Saratogian. Greenjackets games are not broadcast or even mentioned on either television or radio. In the late 1990s/early2000s, taped games were aired on Look TV WNCE (previously known as TV 8).

== Mascots ==
In the late 1990s/early 2000s, the Greenjackets had their one and only mascot in franchise history, GJ. GJ was an anthropomorphic green alligator who wore a Greenjackets jersey.
