= Bleecker Stadium =

Multi-purpose stadium in Albany, New York

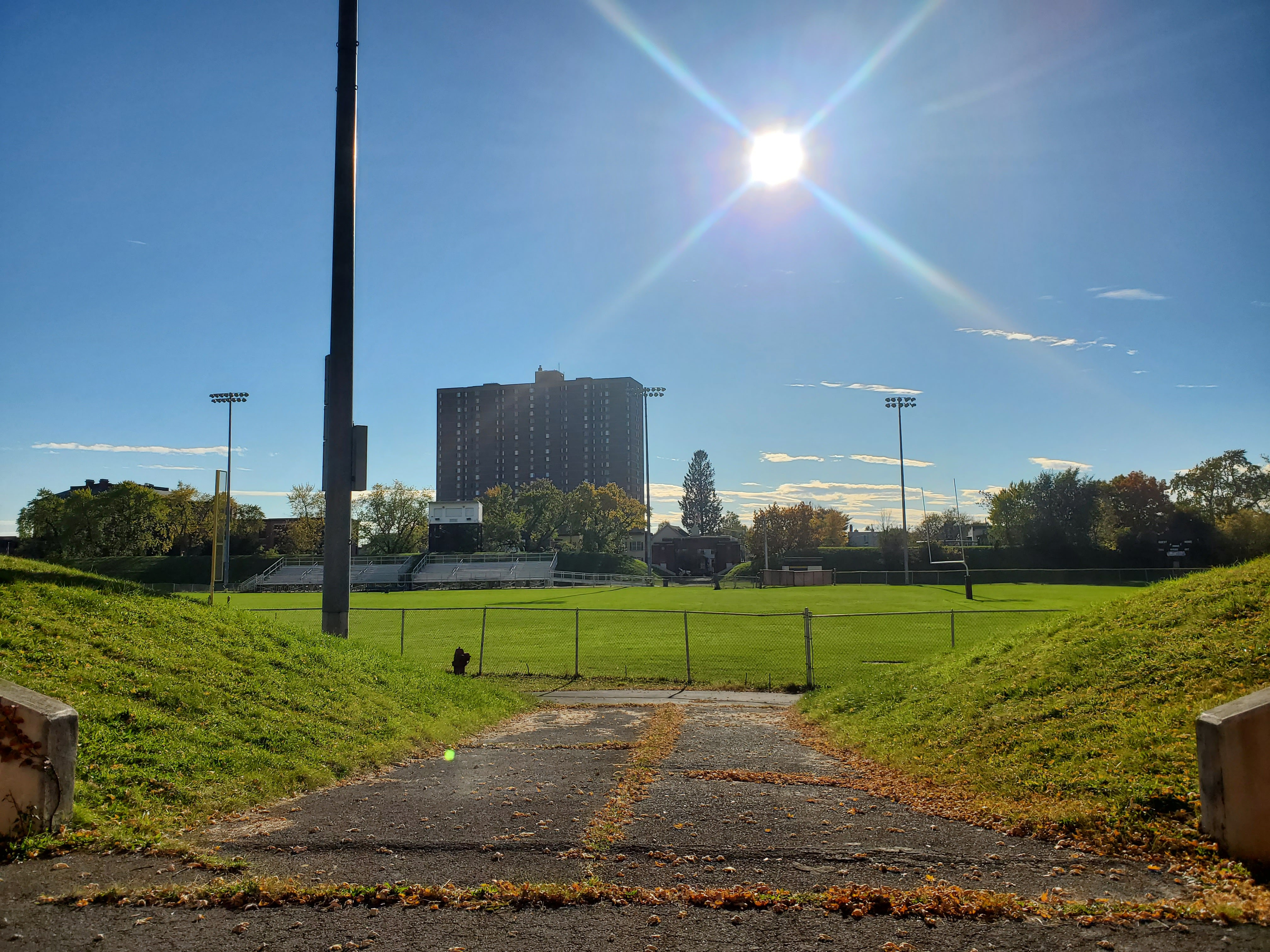
- The Bleecker Stadium grounds

- Location in New York Location in United States
- Former names: Bleecker Reservoir
- Location: 721 Clinton Avenue; Albany, New York 12206
- Coordinates: 42°40′08.37″N 73°46′31.92″W
- Owner: City of Albany
- Capacity: 7,000 for football and soccer; 2,000 for baseball
- Surface: Grass
- Field size
- Bleecker Stadium and Swinburne Park
- U.S. National Register of Historic Places
- NRHP reference No.: 100000889
- Added to NRHP: February 20, 2018

Construction
- Opened: 1934

Tenants
- Albany Twilight League (1934–); Albany Metro Mallers (NEFL) (1974–2011); New York Eagles (ASL) (1979, 1981); Albany A's (EL) (1982); Albany Capitals (ASL/APSL) (1988–1991); Albany Dutchmen (NYCBL) (2009–2010)

Bleecker Stadium is a multi-purpose stadium in Albany, New York. The stadium was once a reservoir for the Albany public water system. Today it has a baseball diamond, football/soccer field, and a softball field used by area high schools, colleges, and youth and adult leagues. Bleecker Stadium hosts several post-season games and series, including the Capital District Pop Warner Super Bowls. The stadium is on Clinton Avenue which is to the south, Ontario Street is to the east, and Second Street is to the north. Swinburne Park borders Bleecker to the west.

In 2018 the stadium and neighboring Swinburne Park were added to the National Register of Historic Places.

== History ==
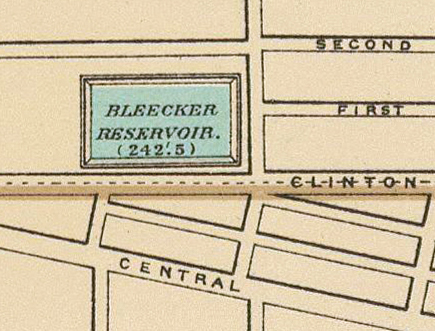
Bleecker Reservoir is shown in this crop from an 1895 map of Albany.

Bleecker Stadium was built as a Federal public works project; originally the stadium was the Bleecker Reservoir, which was constructed in 1850. As Governor of New York, Franklin D. Roosevelt established a jobs relief program that made the conversion of the reservoir, which had become obsolete, possible; and this led to the creation of between 500 and 1,000 jobs. The stadium opened on Thanksgiving Day 1934. The clubhouse was built in 1940 under the Works Progress Administration, also set up by Roosevelt, who by then was President of the United States. Covering 9.5 acres (3.8 ha), the stadium was the ninth largest in the entire United States and the second largest on the East Coast behind Philadelphia. It was named for Albany businessman James Edward Bleecker, a member of an old Albany family which produced several mayors and other officials.

Serial killer Lemuel Smith was brought to Bleecker Stadium in 1977 for an unusual police line-up. Smith and several others were placed behind large plywood sheets scattered around one end of the stadium and a police canine named Crow at the other end sniffed at a priest vestment that Smith had used to wipe himself when defecating after a double-homicide. Crow ran straight across Bleecker Stadium to Smith.

In 1981, the stadium was the site of a rugby match between a regional team of Americans against the South African national rugby team, called the Springboks. Governor Hugh Carey tried to block the game from being played as protest against the South African policy of apartheid, and he even brought the issue all the way to the US Supreme Court. Mayor Erastus Corning 2nd and the Albany Times Union both supported the game being played.

Steve Ontiveros, Charlie O'Brien, and Mike Gallego are all Major League Baseball players who once played at Bleecker Stadium. Hall of Fame ballplayer Johnny Evers was appointed the Superintendent of Bleecker Stadium after being in financial straits and ill-health later in life.

== Structure ==
The stadium has an 18 ft (5.5 m) embankment with three visitor entrances cut through it, each is dedicated to veterans of a particular war; the US Civil War, Spanish–American War, and the First World War. Bleecker Stadium seats 7,000 people for football and soccer and 2,000 for baseball.

== Teams ==
The eight teams of the Albany Twilight League, organized in 1930, have played baseball at Bleecker Stadium since 1934. The ATL was the first and is the oldest user of the stadium. The Albany Metro Mallers are a semi-pro football team that played at the stadium, from 1974 to 2011. The Albany Dutchmen is an amateur team of college players that play in the New York Collegiate Baseball League, and has played at Bleecker Stadium since 2009. The varsity football and baseball teams of the City School District of Albany play at the stadium.

=== Former teams ===
Various colleges have used the field for sports, such as the College of Saint Rose, Siena College, and the University at Albany, SUNY. In 1982 the Albany A's (later Albany-Colonie A's, the Albany-Colonie Yankees, and Albany-Colonie Diamond Dogs) played at the stadium while awaiting completion of Heritage Park in the nearby town of Colonie.

== See also ==
- National Register of Historic Places listings in Albany, New York
