= Sports in New York (state) =

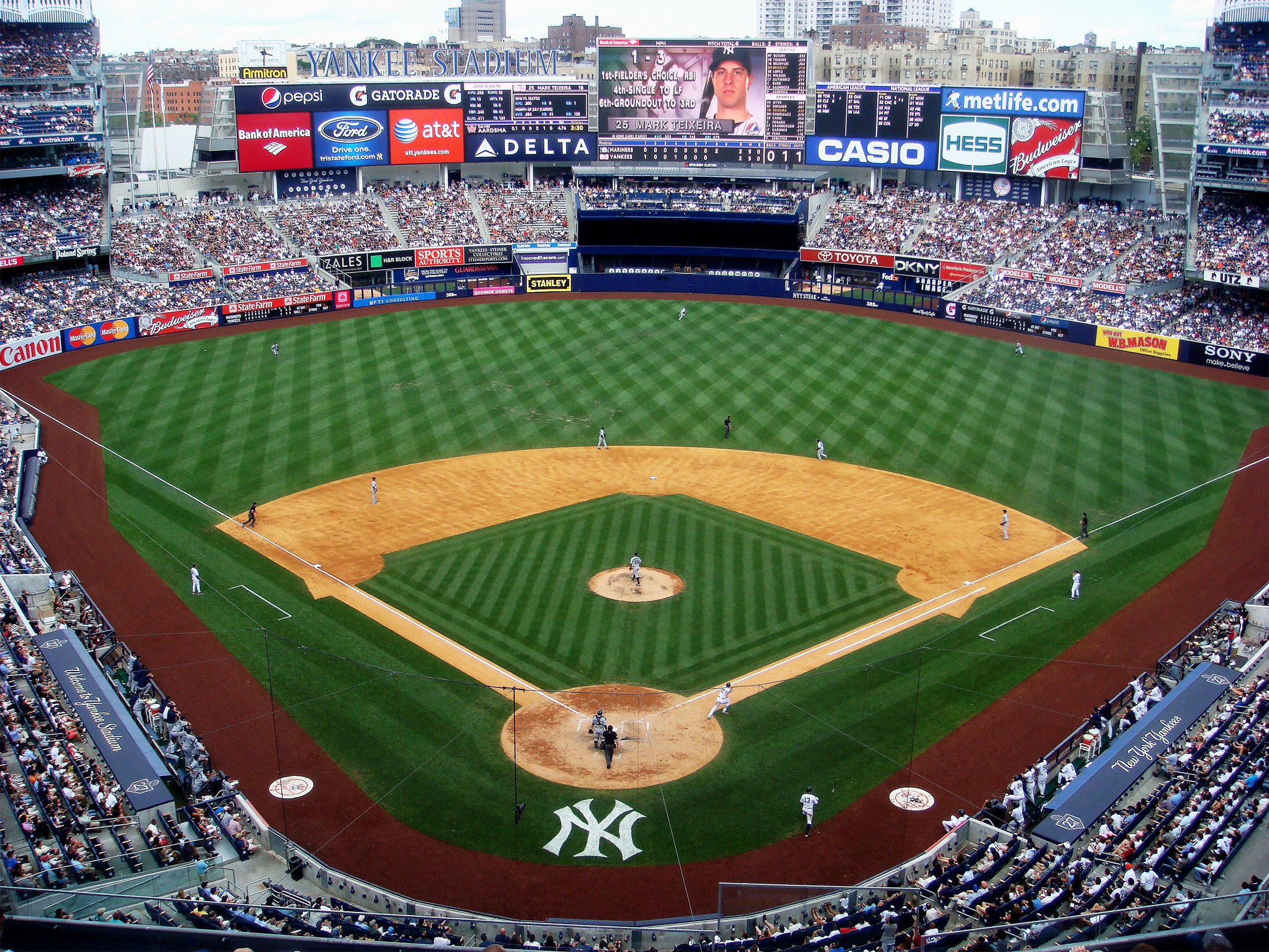
Yankee Stadium in the Bronx, home of the New York Yankees (MLB) and New York City FC (MLS)

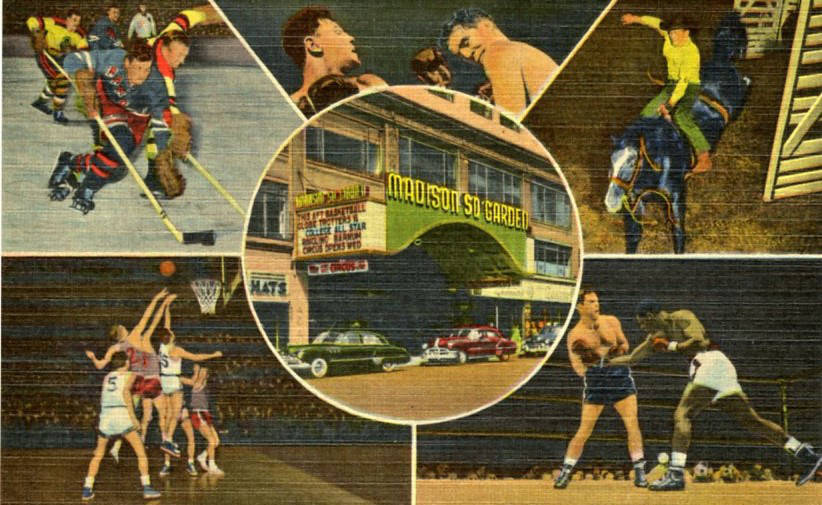
1951 postcard of Madison Square Garden with four views of sporting events: boxing, basketball, ice hockey, and rodeo

New York has two Major League Baseball (MLB) teams, the New York Yankees (based in the Bronx) and the New York Mets (based in Queens). New York is home to three National Hockey League (NHL) franchises: the New York Rangers (based in Manhattan), the New York Islanders (based in Elmont) and the Buffalo Sabres (based in Buffalo). New York has two National Basketball Association (NBA) teams, the New York Knicks (based in Manhattan), and the Brooklyn Nets (based in Brooklyn). New York has one Major League Soccer team: New York City FC (based in the Bronx). The New York Red Bulls play in Sports Illustrated Stadium, located in nearby Harrison, New Jersey.

New York state is the home of one National Football League (NFL) team, the Buffalo Bills (based in the suburb of Orchard Park). The New York Giants and New York Jets also represent the New York metropolitan area and were previously located in New York City, though they play in MetLife Stadium, located in East Rutherford, New Jersey. Both also have their headquarters and training facilities in New Jersey. The Meadowlands stadium hosted Super Bowl XLVIII in 2014, in which New York and New Jersey shared hosting duties.

Former professional sports franchises in New York include MLB's Brooklyn Dodgers (previously based in Brooklyn) and New York Giants (previously based in Manhattan); NBA's Syracuse Nationals (previously based in Geddes and Syracuse), Buffalo Braves (previously based in Buffalo), and Rochester Royals (previously based in Rochester); NHL's New York Americans (previously based in Manhattan); and the NASL's New York Cosmos (previously based in the Bronx, Randall's Island, and East Rutherford) and Rochester Lancers (previously based in Rochester).

There are a variety of minor league teams and leagues throughout the State of New York. The American Hockey League has three of its 31 teams in upstate New York. Baseball leagues that include New York in their territory include the class AAA International League (three teams), class AA Double-A Northeast (the Binghamton Rumble Ponies), independent professional Atlantic League (the Long Island Ducks), and amateur baseball leagues such as the New York Collegiate Baseball League, the Perfect Game Collegiate Baseball League and the Southwestern New York Men's Baseball League.

Numerous college sports teams play in the State of New York at all levels; the Division III State University of New York Athletic Conference and Empire 8 consist almost entirely of New York–based teams.

The state of New York hosted the Olympic Winter Games in 1932 and 1980 in Lake Placid.

== Professional teams ==
=== Current teams ===
| Sport | League | Club |
|---|---|---|
| American football | National Football League | Buffalo Bills |
| American football | National Football League | New York Giants (de jure) |
| American football | National Football League | New York Jets (de jure) |
| Baseball | Major League Baseball | New York Mets |
| Baseball | Major League Baseball | New York Yankees |
| Baseball | International League | Buffalo Bisons |
| Baseball | International League | Rochester Red Wings |
| Baseball | International League | Syracuse Mets |
| Baseball | Eastern League | Binghamton Rumble Ponies |
| Baseball | South Atlantic League | Brooklyn Cyclones |
| Baseball | South Atlantic League | Hudson Valley Renegades |
| Baseball | Atlantic League of Professional Baseball | Long Island Ducks |
| Baseball | Atlantic League of Professional Baseball | Staten Island FerryHawks |
| Baseball | Frontier League | New York Boulders |
| Baseball | Frontier League | Tri-City ValleyCats |
| Basketball | National Basketball Association | Brooklyn Nets |
| Basketball | National Basketball Association | New York Knicks |
| Basketball | Women's National Basketball Association | New York Liberty |
| Basketball | NBA G League | Long Island Nets |
| Basketball | NBA G League | Westchester Knicks |
| Basketball | Exhibition Basketball | Harlem Globetrotters |
| Basketball | Exhibition Basketball | Harlem Wizards |
| Basketball | American Basketball Association | Buffalo eXtreme |
| Basketball | The Basketball League | Albany Patroons |
| Esports | Call of Duty League | Cloud9 New York |
| Gaelic games | Gaelic Athletic Association | New York GAA |
| Golf | Tomorrow Golf League | New York GC |
| Ice hockey | National Hockey League | Buffalo Sabres |
| Ice hockey | National Hockey League | New York Islanders |
| Ice hockey | National Hockey League | New York Rangers |
| Ice hockey | American Hockey League | Rochester Americans |
| Ice hockey | American Hockey League | Syracuse Crunch |
| Ice hockey | American Hockey League | Utica Comets |
| Ice hockey | ECHL | Adirondack Thunder |
| Ice hockey | Federal Prospects Hockey League | Binghamton Black Bears |
| Ice hockey | Federal Prospects Hockey League | Watertown Wolves |
| Ice hockey | Professional Women's Hockey League | New York Sirens (de jure) |
| Indoor soccer | Major Arena Soccer League | Utica City FC |
| Lacrosse | National Lacrosse League | Buffalo Bandits |
| Lacrosse | National Lacrosse League | Rochester Knighthawks |
| Lacrosse | Premier Lacrosse League | New York Atlas |
| Rugby league | USA Rugby League | Brooklyn Kings |
| Rugby league | USA Rugby League | New York Knights |
| Rugby league | USA Rugby League | White Plains Wombats |
| Rugby union | Major League Rugby | Rugby United New York |
| Soccer | Major League Soccer | New York City FC |
| Soccer | Major League Soccer | New York Red Bulls (de jure) |
| Soccer | National Women's Soccer League | Gotham FC (de jure) |
| Soccer | USL Championship | Queensboro FC |
| Soccer | MLS Next Pro | New York City FC II |
| Soccer | MLS Next Pro | New York Red Bulls II (de jure) |
| Soccer | USL League One | Brooklyn FC |
| Soccer | USL League Two | Long Island Rough Riders |
| Soccer | USL League Two | Westchester Flames |
| Soccer | USL League Two | FA Euro New York |
| Soccer | USL League Two | Manhattan SC |
| Soccer | USL League Two | Pathfinder FC |
| Soccer | National Independent Soccer Association | Flower City Union |
| Soccer | National Independent Soccer Association | New York Cosmos |
| Soccer | National Independent Soccer Association | New Amsterdam FC |
| Team tennis | World TeamTennis | New York Empire |

=== Teams that have relocated ===
| Sport | League | Club | Outcome |
|---|---|---|---|
| Baseball | Major League Baseball | Brooklyn Dodgers | Moved to Los Angeles in 1958 and became the Los Angeles Dodgers |
| Baseball | Major League Baseball | New York Giants | Moved to San Francisco in 1958 and became the San Francisco Giants |
| Baseball | New York-Penn League | Jamestown Jammers | |
| Baseball | New York-Penn League | Olean Oilers | |
| Baseball | New York-Penn League | Oneonta Tigers | |
| Baseball | New York-Penn League | Utica Blue Sox | Moved to Aberdeen, Maryland in 2002 as the Aberdeen IronBirds; amateur team claims name and history |
| Baseball | New York-Penn League | Wellsville Nitros | Moved to Norwich, Connecticut as the Connecticut Tigers; amateur team claims name and history |
| Basketball | National Basketball Association | Buffalo Braves | Moved to San Diego in 1978 and became the San Diego Clippers, moved to Los Angeles in 1984 and are now the Los Angeles Clippers |
| Basketball | National Basketball Association | Rochester Royals | Moved to Cincinnati in 1957 as Cincinnati Royals, moved to Kansas City, Missouri, in 1975 and became the Kansas City Kings, moved to Sacramento, California and are now the Sacramento Kings |
| Basketball | National Basketball Association | Syracuse Nationals | Moved to Philadelphia in 1963 as the Philadelphia 76ers |
| Basketball | Basketball Super League | Jamestown Jackals | Moved to Erie, Pennsylvania in 2025 and became the Lake Erie Jackals. |
| Ice hockey | American Hockey League | Albany Devils | Moved to Binghamton in 2017 as the Binghamton Devils |
| Ice hockey | American Hockey League | Albany River Rats | Moved to Charlotte, North Carolina in 2010 as the Charlotte Checkers |
| Ice hockey | American Hockey League | Binghamton Devils | Moved to Utica, New York in 2021 as the Utica Comets |
| Ice hockey | American Hockey League | Binghamton Senators | Moved to Belleville, Ontario in 2017 as the Belleville Senators |
| Ice hockey | National Women's Hockey League | New York Riveters | Moved to Newark, New Jersey in 2016 but were still called New York Riveters; rebranded as Metropolitan Riveters in 2017. The NWHL later renamed itself the Premier Hockey Federation. The Riveters folded along with the league in 2023. |
| Lacrosse | Major League Lacrosse | Rochester Rattlers | Moved to Toronto in 2009 and became the Toronto Nationals; Rochester retained the Rattlers name, colors, and records and relaunched in 2011 |
| Lacrosse | Major League Lacrosse | Rochester Rattlers | Moved to Frisco, Texas, in 2018 and became the Dallas Rattlers |
| Team tennis | World TeamTennis | New York Buzz | Merged into the New York Sportimes in 2011 |
| Team tennis | World TeamTennis | New York Sportimes | Moved to San Diego as the San Diego Aviators in 2014 |

=== Defunct ===
| Sport | League | Club |
|---|---|---|
| American football | National Football League | Brooklyn (NFL) Dodgers/Tigers |
| American football | National Football League | Brooklyn Lions |
| American football | National Football League | Buffalo (NFL) (All-Americans/Bison/Rangers) |
| American football | National Football League | New York Giants (Brickley's) |
| American football | National Football League | New York Yanks/Bulldogs |
| American football | National Football League | New York Yankees (NFL) |
| American football | National Football League | Rochester Jeffersons |
| American football | National Football League | Staten Island Stapletons |
| American football | National Football League (American Professional Football Association) | Tonawanda Kardex |
| American football | United Football League | New York Sentinels (moved to Hartford, Connecticut in 2010 as the Hartford Colonials) |
| American football | Fall Experimental Football League | Brooklyn Bolts |
| American football | Fall Experimental Football League | Hudson Valley Fort |
| American football | XFL (2001) | New York/New Jersey Hitmen |
| American football | XFL (2020) | New York Guardians |
| Arena football | Arena Football League | Albany Empire |
| Arena football | Arena Football League | Buffalo Destroyers (moved to Columbus, Ohio in 2004 as the Columbus Destroyers) |
| Arena football | Arena Football League | New York CityHawks (moved to Hartford, Connecticut in 1999 as the New England Sea Wolves) |
| Arena football | Arena Football League | New York Dragons |
| Arena football | Arena Football League | New York Knights |
| Arena football | AF2 | Rochester Brigade |
| Baseball | National League | Buffalo Bisons (NL) |
| Baseball | National League | New York Mutuals |
| Baseball | National League | Syracuse Stars (National League) |
| Baseball | National League | Troy Trojans (MLB team) |
| Baseball | American Association | Brooklyn Gladiators |
| Baseball | American Association | New York Metropolitans |
| Baseball | American Association | Syracuse Stars (American Association) |
| Baseball | Players' League | Buffalo Bisons (PL) |
| Baseball | Players' League | New York Giants (PL) |
| Baseball | Federal League | Brooklyn Tip-Tops |
| Baseball | Empire Professional Baseball League | Watertown Bucks |
| Basketball | American Basketball League | Bronx Americans |
| Basketball | American Basketball League | Brooklyn Arcadians |
| Basketball | American Basketball League | Brooklyn Celtics |
| Basketball | American Basketball League | Brooklyn Gothams |
| Basketball | American Basketball League | Brooklyn Indians |
| Basketball | American Basketball League | Brooklyn Jewels |
| Basketball | American Basketball League | Brooklyn Visitations |
| Basketball | American Basketball League | Buffalo Bisons |
| Basketball | American Basketball League | Elmira Colonels |
| Basketball | American Basketball League | Glens Falls-Saratoga |
| Basketball | American Basketball League | New Haven Jewels |
| Basketball | American Basketball League | New York Americans |
| Basketball | American Basketball League | New York Gothams |
| Basketball | American Basketball League | New York Hakoahs |
| Basketball | American Basketball League | New York Jewels |
| Basketball | American Basketball League | New York Celtics |
| Basketball | American Basketball League | Passaic Red Devils |
| Basketball | American Basketball League | Rochester Centrals |
| Basketball | American Basketball League | Schenectady Packers |
| Basketball | American Basketball League | Syracuse All-Americans |
| Basketball | American Basketball League | Troy Haymakers |
| Basketball | American Basketball League | Utica Pros |
| Basketball | American Basketball League | Westchester Indians |
| Basketball | American Basketball League | Yonkers Chiefs |
| Basketball | Premier Basketball League | Buffalo 716ers |
| Esports | Overwatch League | New York Excelsior |
| Ice hockey | National Hockey League | New York Americans |
| Ice hockey | World Hockey Association | New York Raiders/Golden Blades (to Jersey Knights to San Diego Mariners) |
| Ice hockey | ECHL | Elmira Jackals |
| Ice hockey | Federal Hockey League | Brewster Bulldogs |
| Ice hockey | Federal Hockey League | Brooklyn Aviators |
| Ice hockey | Federal Hockey League | Broome County Barons |
| Ice hockey | Federal Hockey League | Rome Frenzy |
| Ice hockey | Federal Prospects Hockey League | Elmira Enforcers |
| Ice hockey | Premier Hockey Federation | Buffalo Beauts |
| Ice hockey | Premier Hockey Federation | Metropolitan Riveters (Note: Team represents a location in the state but plays its home games outside the state boundaries.) |
| Softball | American Professional Slo-Pitch League | New York Clippers |
| Softball | American Professional Slo-Pitch League; United Professional Softball League | Rochester Zeniths changed name to Rochester Express |
| Softball | United Professional Softball League | Syracuse Salts |
| Soccer | North American Soccer League | New York Cosmos |
| Soccer | North American Soccer League | Rochester Lancers |
| Soccer | MLS Next Pro | Rochester New York FC |
| Soccer | Major Arena Soccer League | Rochester Lancers |
| Team tennis | World TeamTennis | New York Apples (formerly New York Sets, folded in 1978) |

== Major league professional championships ==
=== New York Yankees (MLB) ===
27 World Series titles

- 1923
- 1927
- 1928
- 1932
- 1936
- 1937
- 1938
- 1939
- 1941
- 1943
- 1947
- 1949
- 1950
- 1951
- 1952
- 1953
- 1956
- 1958
- 1961
- 1962
- 1977
- 1978
- 1996
- 1998
- 1999
- 2000
- 2009

=== New York Mets (MLB) ===
2 World Series titles

- 1969
- 1986

=== New York Giants (MLB) ===
5 World Series titles

- 1905
- 1921
- 1922
- 1933
- 1954

=== Brooklyn Dodgers (MLB) ===
1 World Series title

- 1955

=== New York Cubans (NNL) ===
1 Negro World Series title

- 1947

=== New York Rangers (NHL) ===
4 Stanley Cup titles

- 1928
- 1933
- 1940
- 1994

=== New York Islanders (NHL) ===
4 Stanley Cup titles

- 1980
- 1981
- 1982
- 1983

=== New York Giants (NFL) ===
4 NFL championships (pre–Super Bowl)

- 1927
- 1934
- 1938
- 1956

4 Super Bowl titles

- Super Bowl XXI
- Super Bowl XXV
- Super Bowl XLII
- Super Bowl XLVI

=== New York Jets (NFL) ===
1 Super Bowl title

- 1968 (III)

=== Buffalo Bills (NFL) ===
2 AFL championships (pre–Super Bowl)

- 1964
- 1965

=== New York City FC (MLS) ===
1 MLS Cup title

- 2021

=== New York Cosmos (NASL) ===
5 Soccer Bowl titles (all except 1972 after the team relocated to New Jersey)

- 1972
- 1977
- 1978
- 1980
- 1982

=== Rochester Lancers (NASL) ===
1 Soccer Bowl title

- 1970

=== New York Knicks (NBA) ===
3 NBA Finals titles

- 1970
- 1973
- 2026

=== New York / Brooklyn Nets (NBA) ===
2 ABA Finals titles

- 1974
- 1976

=== Rochester Royals (NBA) ===
1 NBA Finals title

- 1951

=== Syracuse Nationals (NBA) ===
1 NBA Finals title

- 1955

=== New York Liberty (WNBA) ===
1 WNBA Finals title

- 2024

== College sports ==
=== NCAA ===
Full NCAA Division I member colleges in New York

The following is a list of current National Collegiate Athletic Association (NCAA) affiliates in New York state:

| School | Nickname | Division | Conference |
|---|---|---|---|
| University at Albany, State University of New York | Great Danes | I | America East Conference (most sports); CAA Football (football) |
| United States Military Academy (Army) | Black Knights | I | American Conference (football); Patriot League (most sports); Atlantic Hockey America (men's ice hockey) |
| State University of New York at Binghamton | Bearcats | I | America East Conference |
| State University of New York at Buffalo | Bulls | I | Mid-American Conference |
| Canisius University | Golden Griffins | I | Metro Atlantic Athletic Conference (most sports); Atlantic Hockey America (men's ice hockey) |
| Colgate University | Raiders | I | Patriot League (most sports); ECAC Hockey (men's and women's ice hockey) |
| Columbia University | Lions | I | Ivy League |
| Cornell University | Big Red | I | Ivy League (most sports); ECAC Hockey (men's and women's ice hockey) |
| Fordham University | Rams | I | Atlantic 10 Conference (most sports); Patriot League (football) |
| Hofstra University | Pride | I | Coastal Athletic Association |
| Iona University | Gaels | I | Metro Atlantic Athletic Conference |
| Le Moyne College | Dolphins | I | NEC |
| Long Island University | Sharks | I | NEC (most sports); New England Women's Hockey Alliance (women's ice hockey) |
| Manhattan University | Jaspers/Lady Jaspers | I | Metro Atlantic Athletic Conference |
| Marist University | Red Foxes | I | Metro Atlantic Athletic Conference |
| Niagara University | Purple Eagles | I | Metro Atlantic Athletic Conference/Atlantic Hockey America |
| St. Bonaventure University | Bonnies | I | Atlantic 10 Conference |
| St. John's University | Red Storm | I | Big East Conference |
| Siena University | Saints | I | Metro Atlantic Athletic Conference |
| Stony Brook University | Seawolves | I | Coastal Athletic Association; CAA Football (football) (Note: CAA Football, although administered by the multi-sports Coastal Athletic Association, is a separate legal entity.) |
| Syracuse University | Orange | I | Atlantic Coast Conference (most sports); Atlantic Hockey America (women's ice hockey) |
| Wagner College | Seahawks | I | NEC |
| Daemen University | Wildcats | I/II | NEC (men's volleyball); East Coast Conference (other sports) |
| Dominican University | Chargers | I/II | East Coast Conference (men's volleyball) (Note: The East Coast Conference is a Division II conference, but began sponsoring men's volleyball in the 2023–24 school year (2024 season). The NCAA operates a "National Collegiate" men's volleyball championship open to members of Divisions I and II. Scholarship limits in that sport are identical in both divisions.); Central Atlantic Collegiate Conference (other sports) |
| D'Youville University | Saints | I/II | NEC (men's volleyball); East Coast Conference (other sports) |
| Roberts Wesleyan University | Redhawks | I/II | East Coast Conference |
| St. Thomas Aquinas College | Spartans | I/II | East Coast Conference |
| St. Lawrence University | Saints | I/III | ECAC Hockey (men's and women's ice hockey); Liberty League (other sports) |
| Clarkson University | Golden Knights | I/III | ECAC Hockey (men's and women's ice hockey); Liberty League (other sports) |
| Hobart and William Smith Colleges | Statesmen/Herons | I/III | Atlantic 10 Conference (men's lacrosse); Liberty League/ECAC West/Independent |
| Rochester Institute of Technology | Tigers | I/III | Atlantic Hockey America (men's and women's ice hockey); Liberty League (most sports) |
| Rensselaer Polytechnic Institute | Engineers/Red Hawks | I/III | ECAC Hockey (men's and women's ice hockey); Liberty League (other sports) |
| Union College | Dutchmen/Dutchwomen | I/III | ECAC Hockey (men's and women's ice hockey); Liberty League (other sports) |
| Adelphi University | Panthers | II | Northeast-10 Conference |
| Mercy University | Mavericks | II | East Coast Conference |
| Molloy University | Lions | II | East Coast Conference |
| New York Institute of Technology | Bears | II | East Coast Conference |
| Pace University | Setters | II | Northeast-10 Conference/Eastern College Athletic Conference |
| Queens College | Knights | II | East Coast Conference |
| College of Saint Rose | Golden Knights | II | Northeast-10 Conference |
| College of Staten Island | Dolphins | II | East Coast Conference |
| Alfred University | Saxons | III | Empire 8 |
| Alfred State College | Pioneers | III | Allegheny Mountain Collegiate Conference |
| Bard College | Raptors | III | Liberty League/United Volleyball Conference (men's) |
| Baruch College | Bearcats | III | City University of New York Athletic Conference |
| Brooklyn College | N/A | III | City University of New York Athletic Conference |
| Buffalo State University | Bengals | III | State University of New York Athletic Conference/New Jersey Athletic Conference/ECAC West |
| Cazenovia College | Wildcats | III | North Eastern Athletic Conference |
| City College of New York | Beavers | III | City University of New York Athletic Conference |
| Elmira College | Soaring Eagles | III | Empire 8/ECAC West/United Volleyball Conference (men's) |
| Hamilton College | Continentals | III | New England Small College Athletic Conference |
| Hartwick College | Hawks | III | Empire 8 |
| Hilbert College | Hawks | III | Allegheny Mountain Collegiate Conference |
| Houghton University | Highlanders | III | Empire 8 |
| Hunter College | Hawks | III | City University of New York Athletic Conference |
| Ithaca College | Bombers | III | Liberty League/Eastern College Athletic Conference |
| John Jay College of Criminal Justice | Bloodhounds | III | City University of New York Athletic Conference |
| Keuka College | Wolves | III | Eastern College Athletic Conference/Empire 8 |
| Lehman College | N/A | III | City University of New York Athletic Conference/Eastern College Athletic Conference |
| Manhattanville University | Valiants | III | Skyline Conference/MAC Freedom/ECAC West/ECAC East |
| Medgar Evers College | Cougars | III | City University of New York Athletic Conference |
| United States Merchant Marine Academy | Mariners | III | Skyline Conference/New England Women's and Men's Athletic Conference |
| Mount Saint Mary College | Blue Knights | III | Skyline Conference |
| University of Mount Saint Vincent | Dolphins | III | Skyline Conference |
| Nazareth University | Golden Flyers | III | Empire 8/ECAC West/United Volleyball Conference (men's) |
| New York City College of Technology | Yellow Jackets | III | City University of New York Athletic Conference |
| New York University | Violets | III | University Athletic Association/United Volleyball Conference (men's) |
| Pratt Institute | Cannoneers | III | Coast to Coast Athletic Conference |
| University of Rochester | Yellowjackets | III | Liberty League/University Athletic Association |
| Russell Sage College | Gators | III | Eastern College Athletic Conference/Empire 8 |
| Skidmore College | Thoroughbreds | III | Liberty League |
| Saint John Fisher University | Cardinals | III | Eastern College Athletic Conference/Empire 8 |
| St. Joseph's University (Brooklyn) | Bears | III | Skyline Conference |
| St. Joseph's University (Long Island) | Golden Eagles | III | Skyline Conference |
| Sarah Lawrence College | Gryphons | III | Skyline Conference |
| State University of New York at Brockport | Golden Eagles | III | State University of New York Athletic Conference/ECAC West |
| State University of New York at Canton | Roos | III | North Atlantic Conference |
| State University of New York at Cortland | Red Dragons | III | New Jersey Athletic Conference/State University of New York Athletic Conference |
| State University of New York at Delhi | Pioneers | III | American Collegiate Athletic Association/North Atlantic Conference (five sports) |
| State University of New York at Farmingdale | Rams | III | Skyline Conference |
| State University of New York at Fredonia | Blue Devils | III | State University of New York Athletic Conference |
| State University of New York at Geneseo | Knights | III | State University of New York Athletic Conference |
| State University of New York Maritime College | Privateers | III | Skyline Conference |
| State University of New York at Morrisville | Mustangs | III | North Eastern Athletic Conference |
| State University of New York at New Paltz | Hawks | III | State University of New York Athletic Conference/United Volleyball Conference (men's) |
| State University of New York at Old Westbury | Panthers | III | Skyline Conference |
| State University of New York at Oneonta | Red Dragons | III | State University of New York Athletic Conference |
| State University of New York at Oswego/ECAC West | Lakers | III | State University of New York Athletic Conference |
| State University of New York at Plattsburgh/ECAC West | Cardinals | III | State University of New York Athletic Conference |
| State University of New York at Potsdam/ECAC West | Bears | III | State University of New York Athletic Conference |
| State University of New York at Purchase | Panthers | III | Skyline Conference |
| State University of New York Institute of Technology | Wildcats | III | State University of New York Athletic Conference |
| Utica University | Pioneers | III | Empire 8/ECAC West |
| Vassar College | Brewers | III | Liberty League/United Volleyball Conference (men's) |
| Yeshiva University | Maccabees | III | Skyline Conference |
| York College (New York) | Cardinals | III | City University of New York Athletic Conference |

=== USCAA ===
The following is a list of United States Collegiate Athletic Association (USCAA) affiliates in New York state:

| School | Nickname | Conference |
|---|---|---|
| Albany College of Pharmacy and Health Sciences | | Hudson Valley Intercollegiate Athletic Conference |
| Alfred State College | Pioneers | |
| Berkeley College, New York | | Hudson Valley Intercollegiate Athletic Conference |
| Briarcliffe College | | |
| Paul Smith's College | Bobcats | Yankee Small College Conference |
| SUNY Canton | Kangaroos | |
| SUNY College of Environmental Science and Forestry | Mighty Oaks | Hudson Valley Intercollegiate Athletic Conference |
| Vaughn College | Warriors | Hudson Valley Intercollegiate Athletic Conference |

== Olympic Games ==
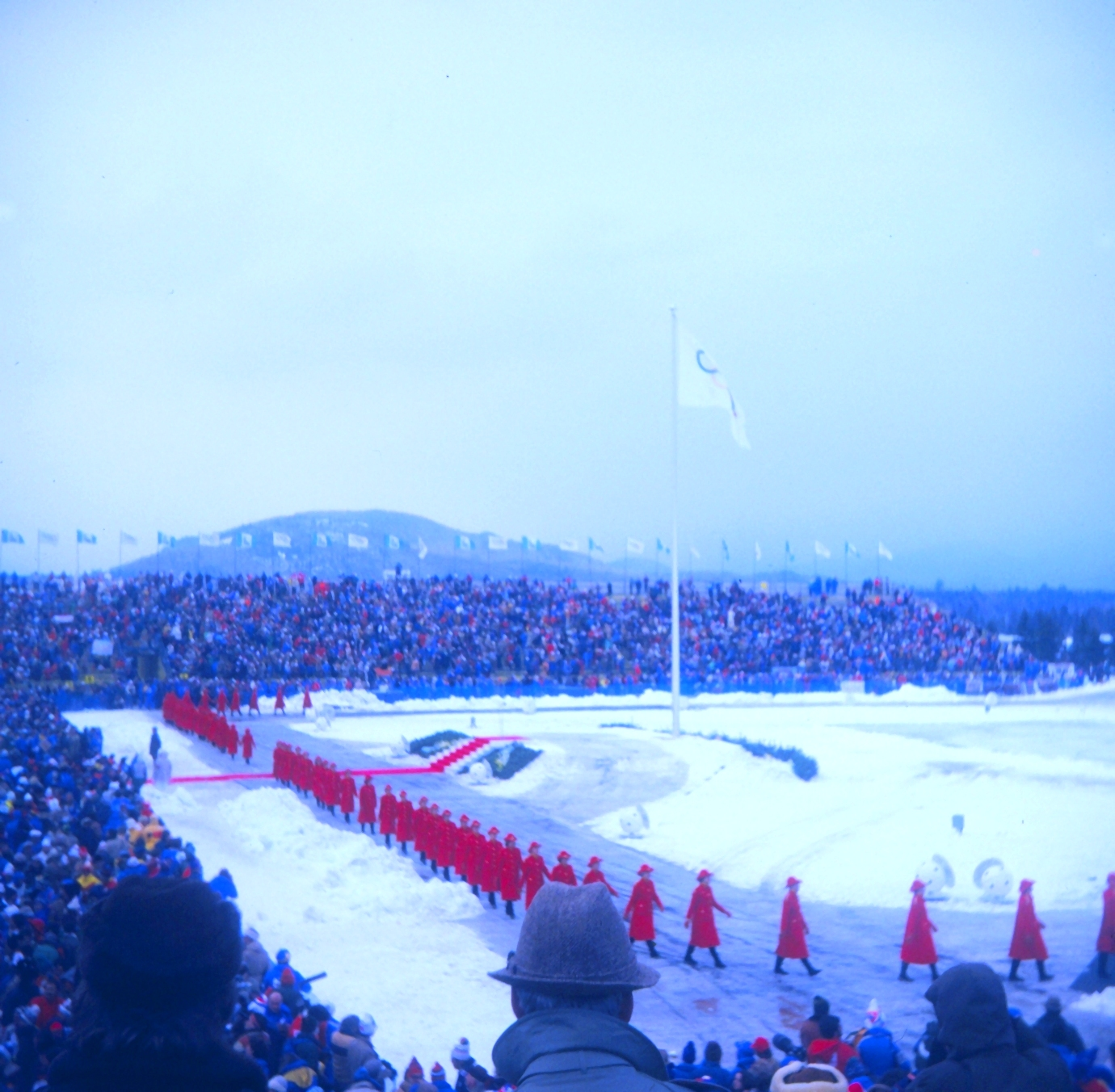
The Opening Ceremony of the 1980 Winter Olympics in Lake Placid.

New York hosted the 1932 and 1980 Winter Olympics in Lake Placid. The 1980 Games are known for the USA–USSR hockey game dubbed the "Miracle on Ice" in which a group of American college students and amateurs defeated the heavily favored Soviet national ice hockey team 4–3 and went on to win the gold medal against Finland. Along with St. Moritz, Switzerland, Innsbruck, Austria and Cortina d’Ampezzo, Italy, Lake Placid is one of four cities to have hosted the Winter Olympic Games twice.

New York City bid to host the 2012 Summer Olympics but lost to London. In June 2026, Governor Kathy Hochul formed an exploratory committee to study a potential New York City-Lake Placid bid for the 2042 Winter Olympics.

New York City is one of six cities outside of Los Angeles which will host Olympic soccer matches during the 2028 Summer Olympics, with Etihad Park set to host nine matches.

== See also ==
- Sports in upstate New York
- Scouting in New York
- Sports in New York City
- Sports in New York's Capital District
- Sports in Syracuse, New York
