= Watertown Red & Black =

Semi-professional American Football team

- Founded: 1896
- League: Independent (1896–1915); New York Pro Football League (1916–1919); Independent (1920–1968); Empire Football League (1969–2015); Northeastern Football Alliance (2016); Empire Football League (2017–2023); Gridiron Developmental Football League (2023); Northeast Football Alliance (2024–Present)
- Team history: Watertown Athletic Association (1896–1902); Watertown Red & Blacks (1902–Present)
- Based in: Watertown, New York
- Stadium: Duffy Fairgrounds
- Colors: Red, Black
- President: Billy and Charlie Caprara (F.X. Caprara)
- Head coach: George Ashcraft
- Championships: 1980, 2009, 2021, 2022

The Watertown Red & Black is a semi-professional American football team based in Watertown, New York. The team is the oldest active semi-pro football team in the United States, and can trace its history to 1896, although the Professional Football Researchers Association (PFRA) claimed it was founded as an Athletic Club in 1899. Because of this, the team has the second most wins (661) and most games played (1,022) of any semi-professional team. They have an overall record of 661–318–43 for a win percentage of .647. The Red & Black have their own showcase in the Pro Football Hall of Fame as being the oldest semi-pro team in the nation.

The team currently plays in the Northeast Football Alliance with home games at the Alex Duffy Fairgrounds in Watertown.

== Beginning ==
In 1902 the Watertown Athletic Association became known as the Red & Black Professional Football Team. Though it declined participation in the first World Series of Pro Football, it loaned its entire backfield to the Syracuse Athletic Club for that team's entry into the tournament, the first ever attempted national professional football championship. (The enhanced Syracuse team, which included Pop Warner, won the tournament in an upset.)

During the 1903 season, the Red & Black defeated a team from Cortland, New York by a score of 142–0, the second-highest in football history (behind only a 148–0 win by the Massillon Tigers over a team from Marion, Ohio a year later). Watertown participated in the 1903 World Series of Pro Football, finishing second to the Franklin Athletic Club, to whom the Red & Black lost, 12–0.

== First half of the 20th century ==
The Red & Black team, mostly located too far from pro football's core in Ohio and western Pennsylvania to play an extensive schedule against other fully professional teams, then dropped back to the semi-professional level in 1904 and has played with semi-pro status ever since. This allowed the scheduling of teams located within what was then a reasonable travel distance of Watertown. Several teams during the decades of the 1900s, 1910s and 1920s brought the semi-professional championships of New York State home to Watertown. Alex Duffy wore the colors for 17 seasons, the last 15 as captain during the 1910s and 1920s.

In 1919, the team participated in the New York Pro Football League playoffs, losing in the regional quarterfinals ("Central New York Championship") to Syracuse.

During the 1923–1925 seasons, the team won 31 games, losing only to Binghamton, 6–0. The 1927 squad was undefeated. In 1935, the Red & Black was reorganized under George (Buzzy) Gibson and produced several outstanding teams. In 1936, the Red & Black played an exhibition game against the Syracuse Braves of the American Football League, losing 14–7.

Jake Devito and Rocco Canale guided the team when it was a member of the Eastern Professional League in the late 1940s and early 1950s. In 1950, the Red & Black went undefeated until losing the championship game to Hudson Falls at the Fairgrounds in Watertown.

== Second half of the 20th century ==
In 1954, after a two-year hiatus, the Red & Black was reorganized by Dick Doe and Budjo Alteri, assisted by Earl Cole. Johnny Marra was the sponsor. Boots Gaffney coached the team, assisted by Joe Guardino and Nelson Sholett. In four seasons, beginning in 1954, the team won 28 games, lost one and tied two. In these four seasons, the defense allowed but 50 points. The team was again disbanded after the 1959 season.

In 1969, Carmen Scudera, Francis Lyng and John Morgia headed efforts to revive the Red & Black. Pat Killorin was selected as coach and the team had a successful season of four wins, three losses. It was not only competitively successful but financially successful as well. Crowds of 5000 to 6000 were reported at the games.

In 1971 and 1974, the Red & Black went undefeated. In 1980, the team reached its pinnacle of modern history, nearly comparable to that of the 1903 team. The team, playing under the direction of Jim Powers and Tom LaDuke won the Empire Football League Championship and was ranked second in the nation by Pro Football Weekly.

From 1980 until 1991 the team was under the direction of several different coaches. In 1991 to present, George Ashcraft took over as the head coach. Mike Britton was the offensive coordinator from 1992 through the 2000 season starting his own semi-pro team, the St. Lawrence Trailblazers in 2002. The Red and Black have made the playoffs every year since 1993. The team briefly played in the New York Amateur Football League (now the Northeastern Football Alliance) in the late 1990s, but a few years later, moved back to the EFL. In 2003 they won the Northern Division Championship.

== Twenty-first century ==
=== 2000s ===
In 2005 agency producers contacted several AFA member teams regarding use of players and coaches to give their TV commercials the professional football appearance they were looking for. One such Chunky soup commercial, featuring Philadelphia Eagles quarterback Donovan McNabb did just that. Several Empire League football players were used in the production of that popular TV spot. The agency relied heavily on the coaching experience of AFA Hall of Famer George Ashcraft from the EFL's Watertown Red and Black team. Ashcraft provided the agency with the technical football advice (and several EFL players) they needed to make the McNabb/Chunky soup commercial convincing to the viewers. It is the Red & Black players and other EFL players wearing the Cleveland Browns uniforms.

In 2006 the Red & Black was the floater team for the EFL. They played all of the teams once. They were the only floater team, but were still considered a Northern Division team. They won the Northern Division Championship game against the Vermont Ice Storm and lost to the Albany Metro Mallers in the EFL championship game.

In 2007, the team finished with a 12–4 overall record. They were the 2007 Western Division Champs and lost in the EFL championship game to the Vermont Ice Storm 9–8. They went on to play in the National Tournament at Watertown High School. Before the game there was a tribute in memory of a fallen coach and soldier, Dave Connell, who lost his life in Iraq. The Tenth Mountain Division at Fort Drum landed a helicopter on the field before the game to deliver the game ball. Four members of the Watertown Red & Black team returned home from Iraq that week and played in the game. They were Ben Pritchard, Lorenzo Sanchez, Gregory Duckson, and Mike Jester. The team lost to the Monroe County Sting of the New York Amateur Football League 21–6. Monroe went on to win the National Championship game. Long-time veteran Earnie Wash also returned home from Iraq earlier in the season to finish the year.

The 2008 season saw Thomas Schultz of Sports Partners Inc. claim that he "bought" the team, with intentions to move it back to the Northeastern Football Alliance. The owners of the Red & Black denied this, and a court settlement eventually led to Schultz being barred from using the "Red & Black" name. Schultz's team took to the field as the Watertown Revolution for the NFA, with no further connection to the Red & Black. (The Revolution later relocated to the nearby town of Carthage. The original Red & Black played in the EFL and finished with a 4–7 overall record.

The Red & Black rebounded in 2009 to win the Empire Football League championship over the Plattsburgh North Stars 6–0 at the Alex Duffy Fairgrounds. Almost 3000 fans packed around the field to watch the team win its first EFL Championship since 1980. The Team finished with a 13–1 overall record. The Red and Black did go to Florida and played the Carolina Express in the Orange Blossom Bowl in January. After a hard-fought battle the Red and Black came up short and lost 7–6. Running back Anthony Noel and LB Dustin Houppert received honors for the team for their outstanding play. The team finished with over 3,800 yards in offense. The defense posted seven shutouts. The Red and Black was ranked 20th in the nation on October 13.

=== 2010s ===
To start the 2010 season the Watertown Red & Black traveled to Florida to play in the Orange Blossom Bowl. The Red and Black played The Carolina Express. It was a hard-fought battle but the Red & Black came up short losing 7–6. Dustin Houppert and Anthony Noel received honors for the team for their great play. The Red & Black took the field in June with no choice but to defend their title. The team finished with a 12–3 overall record making it to their second championship in two years. The team lost to the Plattsburgh Northstars in the Championship game 13–10. The R&B missed a field goal with 22 seconds left that would have put the game in overtime. The Red and Black finished another great season. Quarterback Brian Williams and running back Joe Brennan led the offense both rushing over a thousand yards. This was the first time since 1902. Also Mike Dumaw led the defense receiving all league honors becoming the second player on the Red & Black team to be the EFL Iron man of the year.

In 2011, the team finished 6v6. After starting the season 1–4 the Red and Black regrouped and surge into the playoffs beating the Glenns Falls Greenjackets on the road for the first round of playoffs. The team will never forget that day after the events that led up to the game. Being the true underdogs the Red and Black pulled out a 17–10 victory after trailing 10–0. A week later the team lost to the Syracuse Shock in a hard-fought battle to finish the season 6–6. The team also earned many EFL honors at the end of the season.

In 2012, the Red and Black finished with a 9–5 overall record falling to the Plattsburgh North Stars in the second round of the EFL Playoffs. The Red and Black defeated League Champs the Monore County Sting and previously League runner up the Syracuse Shock in 2012. The team once again finished with many players receiving EFL honors.

In 2013, the team finished with a 4–7 overall record. With many new faces the team was still a competitor in the League. Unable to keep momentum due to bye weeks the Watertown footballers had some bright moments. Beating the Northstars at home for the first time since the 2009 EFL Championship and Winning on the Road in a non league game vs the Impact who later went on to win the NFA Championship.

=== 2020s ===
The team canceled its 2020 season amid the COVID-19 pandemic. For the 2021 season Watertown played in the EFL's West Division with the Northern New York Grizzlies and Syracuse Smash. They finished the season with a 7–1 record, and won the EFL championship after beating Glens Falls Greenjackets 37–8 in the final, while Quarterback Kalon Jeter was named as the EFL's Most Valuable Player. It was the third ever league championship for the Red and Black and its first since 2009.

In 2022 the Red & Black finished the season undefeated for the first time in franchise history, going 13–0 after beating the Greenjackets 30–14, for the second consecutive league title. The Red & Black were invited to the post season Tangerine Bowl but would lose to the Tri City Outlaws (TN) 13–31.

In 2023 the Red & Black announced they would be leaving the EFL after 54 years and joining the pro Gridiron Developmental Football League (GDFL), as a result of uncertainty if the league would play the 2023 season. The team finished the season with a 6–4 record and lost to the Upstate Predators (NY) 28–0 in the opening round of the GDFL playoffs. After the season ended they decided to move to the Northeast Football Alliance, because of a scheduling conflicts.
