= New England Football League =

American football league

- Formerly: Greater Lawrence Men's Football League
- Sport: American football
- Founded: 1994
- Founder: Tom Torrisi
- No. of teams: 10
- Country: United States
- Headquarters: Salisbury, Massachusetts
- Most recent champion: Middleboro Cobras
- Website: nefl.us

The New England Football League (NEFL) is a semi-professional American football league based in Salisbury, Massachusetts, and is a nonprofit corporation founded by Thomas Torrisi. It is the largest semi-professional league in New England, and has been one of the biggest leagues in the United States. The NEFL was founded in 1994 and was also known as the Greater Lawrence Men's Football League. In 2025, the league added a number of new teams expanding back to its historic 3 level format.

From 2013 to 2019, the NEFL had single-A, AA, and AAA conferences, with annual promotion and relegation among conferences based on game results, so that the best teams worked their way toward the higher levels. From 2021 to 2023 the league featured A and AA conferences. In 2025 the league returned to its multi-level format with the addition of a number of new teams, featuring A, AA, and AAA conferences. In 2026 the league expects to add several more teams to the existing conferences, as well as adding a spring conference, which would play a shorter schedule prior to the traditional NEFL season kickoff.

The league provides competitive football for adult players. It is a "working man's league", as most players have regular jobs during the week. Teams practice on weeknights and play virtually all games on weekends. Players are not paid for their participation, and they often pay up to $200 to be on the team's roster. The league runs from July through September, followed by single-elimination championship tournaments within each conference. Each team can dress up to 65 players.

The league is unrelated to the original NEFL, which operated from 1964 to 1969.

The 2025 NEFL season finished with three league champions in AAA, AA and A; the Rhode Island Riptide won the Maritime (A) Conference by defeating the New London Silverbacks 28-0, their third NEFL Championship (2011, 2023). The Windsor (CT) Flyers won the North Atlantic Conference (AA), their first in program history in the NEFL, by beating the Haverhill Hitmen 28-14. The top level Colonial Conference (AAA) championship was won by the New England Bombers by defeating the Boston Bandits 26-16.

== League history ==
The New England Football League was founded in 1994 by League President and Director of Marketing, Tom Torrisi, Chairman Matt Brien, Commissioner Bob Oreal, Vice-President and Treasurer John Motta and Secretary Christine Torrisi. It started its 1994 season with four teams. By 1997, the number of teams tripled to twelve; in 2002, the league had at least one team in each New England state, and started its three-conference alignment with three different skill levels, one for each conference. The 2006 was the first season with at least 30 teams, making the NEFL one of the largest semi-pro football leagues in the country. Following the 2020 covid-era the league contracted to as few as 7 teams, but has since grown back to 22 teams for the summer 2026 season across all three conferences. In 2026, the league also hosted its inaugural spring season with 7 teams.

The League is distinguishable from numerous other semi-pro leagues by features like its annual All-Star Game, Independent Board of Directors, and its 30+ years of continuous operation. A by-product of the league's lengthy history is the New England Football League Hall of Fame which honors noteworthy participants in NEFL history.

== Game rules ==
The NEFL describes its rule set as "modified NCAA rules". Most rules are adopted from the NCAA rulebook, but there are also a few NFL rules and NEFL-specific rules. Games use a free-running clock until five minutes left in either half or overtime, at which time the clock stops according to NFL rules. Game time is usually kept by an official on the field, but for some games is kept on the scoreboard by a paid, uniformed official operating it.

== Current teams ==
=== Colonial Conference (AAA) (2026) ===
Team	Stadium	City/Area
Northeast Bulls	Falcon Field	Meriden, Connecticut
New York Bears	Joseph St. Lawrence Sports Complex	Hillburn, New York
Valley Generals	Derby High School	Derby, Connecticut
Boston Bandits	West Roxbury High School	Boston, Massachusetts
Brooklyn Pharaohs	Brookville Park	Brooklyn, New York

=== North Atlantic Conference (AA) (2026) ===
Team	Stadium	City/Area
New England Bombers	Braintree High School	Braintree, Massachusetts
Middleboro Cobras	Battis Field	Middleborough, Massachusetts
Glens Falls Greenjackets	East Field	Glens Falls, New York
Troy City Titans	Durfee High School	Fall River, Massachusetts
Haverhill Hitmen	Veterans Memorial Stadium	Haverhill, Massachusetts
Connecticut Tarheels	Coginchaug Regional High School	Braintree, Massachusetts
Granite State Destroyers	St. Anselm College	Manchester, New Hampshire
Rhody Ravens	Macomber Stadium	Meriden, Connecticut

=== Maritime Conference (A) (2026) ===
Team	Stadium	City/Area
Vermont Ravens	Burlington High School	Burlington, Vermont
Cumberland Coyotes	Tucker Field	Cumberland, Rhode Island
Metro West Golden Badgers	Foley Stadium	Worcester, Massachusetts
Mass Tsunami	Holyoke High School	Springfield, Massachusetts
Hartford Blue Devils	Colt Park	Hartford, Connecticut
Connecticut Bruins	Osgood Park	New Britain, Connecticut
Granite State Destroyers	St. Anselm College	Manchester, New Hampshire
Connecticut Wolves	Old Killingly High School Field	Danielson, Connecticut
New Hampshire Phoenix	Welch Baseball Fields	Raymond, New Hampshire
Middlesex County Longhorns	Manning Field	Lynn, Massachusetts

== 2025 Teams ==
=== Colonial Conference (AAA) (2025) ===
Team	Stadium	City/Area
New England Bombers	Braintree High School	Braintree, Massachusetts
Middleboro Cobras	Battis Field	Middleborough, Massachusetts
Glens Falls Greenjackets	East Field	Glens Falls, New York
Boston Bandits	West Roxbury High School	Boston, Massachusetts
Mill City Eagles	Lawrence High School	Lawrence, Massachusetts
Granite State Destroyers	St. Anselm College	Manchester, New Hampshire

=== North Atlantic Conference (AA) (2025) ===
Team	Stadium	City/Area
Windsor Flyers	Rockville High School Field	Vernon, Connecticut
Haverhill Hitmen	Haverhill Stadium	Haverhill, Massachusetts
Mass. Warriors	Nikitas Field	Fitchburg, Massachusetts
Rhode Island Raptors	Tucker Field	Cumberland, Rhode Island
Middlesex County Longhorns	Woburn High School	Woburn, Massachusetts

=== Maritime Conference (A) (2025) ===
Team	Stadium	City/Area
Rhode Island Riptide	Stebbins Field at Cranston Stadium	Cranston, Rhode Island
New London County Silverbacks	New London High School	New London, Connecticut
New England Black Panthers	American International College	Springfield, Massachusetts
Vermont Ravens	Burlington High School	South Burlington, Vermont
Metro-west Golden Badgers	Daly Field Athletics Complex	Boston, Massachusetts

== 2024 Teams ==
Team	Stadium	City/Area
Glens Falls Greenjackets	East Field	Glens Falls, New York
Middleboro Cobras	Battis Field	Middleborough, Massachusetts
New England Bombers	Alumni Stadium at Braintree High School	Braintree, Massachusetts
Rhode Island Riptide	Stebbins Field at Cranston Stadium	Cranston, Rhode Island
Southern Vermont Storm	Storm Stadium	Bennington, Vermont
Worcester Wildcats	Commerce Bank Field at Foley Stadium	Worcester, Massachusetts
Vermont Ravens	South Burlington High School	South Burlington, Vermont

== 2023 Teams ==
=== North Atlantic Conference (AA) (2023) ===
Team	Stadium	City/Area
Glens Falls Greenjackets	East Field	Glens Falls, New York
Mass Warriors	Wayland High School	Wayland, Massachusetts
Middleboro Cobras	Battis Field	Middleborough, Massachusetts
Western Mass Blitzin Bears	Roberts Sports Complex	Holyoke, Massachusetts
Worcester Wildcats	Commerce Bank Field at Foley Stadium	Worcester, Massachusetts

=== Maritime Conference (A) (2023) ===
Team	Stadium	City/Area
Connecticut Reapers	Crosby High School Field	Waterbury, Connecticut
New England Bombers	Alumni Stadium at Braintree High School	Braintree, Massachusetts
Rhode Island Riptide	Stebbins Field at Cranston Stadium	Cranston, Rhode Island
Vermont Ravens	South Burlington High School	South Burlington, Vermont

== League champions ==
Annual League Champions Based on Conference
Year	Team	A	AA	AAA
1994	Lawrence Lightning			
1995	North Shore Rage			
1996	Massachusetts Havoc			
1997	Massachusetts Havoc			
1998	Lowell Nor'easter			
1999	Lowell Nor'easter			
2000		Seacoast Hawks	Lowell Nor'easter	
2001		Southern Maine Raging Bulls	Boston Bandits	
2002		Connecticut Thunder	Vermont Ice Storm	Lowell Nor'easter
2003		Seacoast Hawks	New England Stars	Boston Bandits
2004		Hampton Hurricanes	Connecticut Thunder	Lowell Nor'easter
2005		Rhode Island Raptors	Seacoast Hawks	Boston Bandits
2006		Notre Dame Cobras	North Attleboro Renegades	Boston Bandits
2007		Leominster Razorbacks	Whaling City Clippers	Middleboro Cobras
2008		Tri City Charge	Whaling City Clippers	Middleboro Cobras
2009	Connecticut Spartans	New Hampshire Wolfpack	Tri City Charge	Lowell Nor'easter
2010	Seacoast Hawks	Connecticut Panthers	Western Mass Warriors	Lowell Nor'easter
2011		Rhode Island Riptide	New Hampshire Wolfpack	Connecticut Bearcats
2012	Connecticut Bearcats	Cape Cod Seadogs	South Shore Outlaws	Western Mass Warriors
2013		Central Mass Sabercats	Pioneer Valley Knights	Connecticut Panthers
2014		Brass City Brawlers	Rhode Island Wardogs	Connecticut Panthers
2015		Port City Vipers	Somerville Rampage	Boston Bandits
2016		Mass State Wolverines	South Coast Outlaws	Western Connecticut Militia
2017		Southern Vermont Storm	Mass State Wolverines	Connecticut Panthers
2018		Seacoast Warhawks	Worcester Wildcats	Boston Bandits
2019		Connecticut Brawlers	Worcester Wildcats	Marlboro Shamrocks
2020		Green Valley Blackhawks	Boston Bandits	
2021		Hartford Colts	Western Mass Blitzin Bears	
2022		Mass Warriors	Western Mass Blitzin Bears	
2023		Rhode Island Riptide	Glens Falls Greenjackets	
2024			Middleboro Cobras	
2025		Rhode Island Riptide	Windsor Flyers	New England Bombers
