= Albany Metro Mallers =

American semi-professional football team

General information
- Headquartered: New York

Current uniform

The Albany Metro Mallers were a semi-professional football team. The team has regularly appeared in national semipro playoffs and won the national semipro title in 2008, 2013, and 2016. Some of the team's players have gone on to play professional football.

The Mallers most recently played in the World Football Federation, a league based in the Northeast. The Mallers finished the 2017 season, which included a trip to Florida for the USFA Semi Pro National Championship Game, with a 12–2 record, but have not played any football since then.

== Team history ==
=== The Seaboard League: NFL castoffs trying to make it back ===
After the team's first year in 1972, the Mallers moved into the Seaboard Football League in 1973, which had teams in New York, New Jersey, Pennsylvania and Maryland. They played their home games in Schenectady, New York, that year. Unlike most semipro leagues, which had only local players and did not pay their players, the Seaboard League teams brought in players from outside their areas, paid their players modestly and helped them find local jobs. League teams were able to attract numerous players who had been signed to NFL contracts, had been cut in the preseason, and were hoping to make the NFL eventually. More than ten of the Mallers had been in NFL camps. Later in the season, the team made an informal arrangement with the Montreal Alouettes of the Canadian Football League to develop players for the Alouettes who had been released by that team., Three of the players on the 1973 Mallers (Bill Ellenbogen, Don Aleksiewicz and Gary Weinlein) played professional football eventually, although none ever played for the Alouettes.

=== Becoming amateurs ===
The Seaboard Football League folded at the end of that season, and the team joined the Empire Football League, a league with teams primarily located in Upstate New York that prohibited paying their players. The Mallers moved to Albany that year. They finished second in the league in 1975 and 1976, and won the league championship in 1979.

In 1981, the team moved into the Eastern Football League, which had teams in Massachusetts and in New York State. The Mallers won the league championship, 12–9, on a 73-yard flea flicker touchdown pass thrown by wide receiver Mike DeCarlo that was deflected by a defender into the hands of wide receiver Davey Williams, who held on to it and then ran the remaining 50 yards into the end zone.

The Mallers also won the Eastern Football League championship in 1986, defeating the Marlboro Shamrocks, 23–14. The Metro Mallers returned to the Empire Football League in 1987, and finished second in the league that year. They won the league championship in 1989, and finished second in the league in 1990.

=== NFL players' strike: Some Mallers become replacements ===
In 1987, during the NFL players' strike, three members of the team were signed to play on NFL replacement teams (Dana Melvin, Robbin Williams and Joe Burke). Only running back Joe Burke, who had been named the 1986 American Football Association Player of the Year as the best semipro football player in the country, saw actual playing time, however. Burke returned to the Mallers in time to play in the American Football Association national playoffs in November 1987. The Mallers also were in the national playoffs in 1991, losing to the eventual national champion Brooklyn Mariners, 12–6.

=== 2004 to 2017: Regional and national success ===
The Mallers finished second in the Empire Football League in 2004, and won the league in 2005 and 2006. In 2006 they won the United States Football Alliance (USFA) Eastern Championship.

In 2007, the team again changed leagues, moving into the North American Football League. They won the Empire Division in their first year in that league.

In 2008, the Mallers were named as the USFA and Minor League Football News (MLFN) National Champions. In 2011, the Mallers returned to the Empire Football League and captured the EFL title with a 26–14 victory against the Syracuse Shock. In 2013, the Mallers joined SPF-The League, a western NY-based league. The Mallers defeated the S. Buffalo Celtics to win the league title and win the USFA/USFF National title after travelling to Racine, Wisconsin, and beating the host Raiders, 26–14. In 2014, the Mallers moved to the Gridiron Developmental Football League.

In 2015, the Albany Metro Mallers moved to the World Football Federation. The Mallers won the first inaugural WFF Championship Game by defeating the Central Penn Piranhas 16–6.

In 2016, the Albany Metro Mallers would play for the National Championship in DeLand, Florida vs. Midwest (MO) Chargers. They went on to win 38–6, and became the 2016 National Champions.

In 2017, the Albany Metro Mallers would play for the National Championship once again, in DeLand, Florida at Stetson University vs. PAFL (Premier Amateur Football League) Champions Columbus (OH) Fire. The Mallers lost 13–6.

On June 11, 2018, the Albany Metro Mallers posted on their Facebook page that they would not be playing a regular season in 2018. The team has not played any games since.

=== Scott Lawson, record-breaking quarterback ===
Quarterback Scott Lawson, who has been with the Mallers since 1990, broke the all-time semipro football record for the most touchdown passes in a career when he threw his 379th touchdown pass on October 4, 2008, against the Troy Fighting Irish. He has continued to play, and as of the end of the 2009 season, he had increased his record to 415 touchdown passes.

=== List Of Albany Metro Mallers Championships ===
- USFA National Champions (2008, 2013, 2016)
- EFL (Empire Football League) Champions (1979, 1989, 2005, 2006, 2011)
- EFL (Eastern Football League) Champions (1981, 1986)
- NAFL Empire Champions (2007, 2009)
- USFA Eastern Region Champions (2006, 2016, 2017)
- World Football Federation Champions (2015)
- SPF "The League" Champions (2013)

== Metro Mallers that have played professional football ==
The following Metro Mallers players played during the regular season for professional teams:

Player	Pro football position	Team and year
Bill Ellenbogen	Offensive and defensive line	Metro Mallers, 1973; New York Giants, 1976, 1977.
Don Aleksiewicz	Running back	Metro Mallers, 1973; Philadelphia Bell, WFL, 1974.
Gary Weinlein	Defensive back, wide receiver, quarterback	Metro Mallers, 1973–1976, 1983; Toronto Argonauts (CFL), 1978.)
Dave Boisture	Quarterback	Metro Mallers, 1982; New Jersey Generals (USFL), 1983. Baltimore Stars (USFL), 1985.
Joe Burke	Running back	Metro Mallers, 1983–1988; New York Jets, 1987.
Robbin Williams	Defensive back, wide receiver	Metro Mallers, 1986–1991; Albany Firebirds (AFL), 1991.
John Chaney	Defensive back, wide receiver	Metro Mallers, 1991; Albany Firebirds (AFL), 1991–1992.
Vinny Cirrincione	Placekicker	Metro Mallers, 2004–2006; Albany Conquest (AF2), 2004, 2005; Birmingham Steel Dogs (AF2), 2005.

== Metro Mallers who are among the all-time semipro record holders ==
=== Scoring records ===
Record	Stat.	Player	Date	Rank (semipro history)
Total points, season	188	Joe Burke	1986	4th
Two-point conversions (receiving, game)	2	J.V. Marion	October 11, 1986	2nd
Longest field goals	54 yards	Al Darling	September 12, 1981	36th
Combined returns Touchdowns (game)	3	Jeff Lipscomb	1986	6th
Fumble recoveries Touchdown (season)	6	Jeff Lipscomb	1986	1st

=== Passing records ===
Record	Stat	Player	Date	Rank (semipro history)	Note
Attempts (career)	5016	Scott Lawson	1990–2000; 2004–2008	1st	1st in history. 2009 season not included
Completions (career)	3138	Scott Lawson	1990–2000; 2004–2008	1st	1st in history. 2009 season not included
Yards (career)	37,362	Scott Lawson	1990–2000; 2004–2008	1st	1st in history. 2009 season not included
Touchdowns (career)	437	Scott Lawson	1990–2000; 2004–2009	1st	
Interceptions (career)	155	Scott Lawson	1990–2000; 2004–2008	2nd	2nd in history through 2008
Longest halfback option pass	73 yards	Mike DeCarlo	October 10, 1981	3rd	

=== Rushing records ===
Record	Stat	Player	Year	Rank (semipro history)
Yards (season)	1766 yards (217 attempts) (16 TDs)	Don Aleksiewicz	1973	9th
Most 100 yard games (career)	23	Joe Burke	1983–1988	1st
Most 100 yard games (season)	7	Don Aleksiewicz	1973	5th

=== Miscellaneous records ===
Record	Stat	Player	Year	Rank (semipro history)
Fumble recoveries (season)	6	Jeff Lipscomb	1986	5th
Fumble recoveries (game)	3	Bill Widenman	1973	2nd
Longest interception return	100 yards	Mike Palmer		10th

== See also ==
- Sports in New York's Capital District
