= Seaboard Football League =

Defunct American football league

- Sport: American football
- Founded: 1971
- Folded: 1974
- Claim to fame: The last pro league to play inter-league game against an NFL team
- No. of teams: 8 (6 in the last season)
- Countries: United States
- Last champion: Wilkes-Barre Bullets

The Seaboard Football League was an American football minor league that operated from 1971 to 1974. It folded during the 1974 season as a result of the founding of the World Football League, which deprived the league of talent.

Some of the more notable Seaboard Football league alumni include Vince Papale, who went on to the WFL's Philadelphia Bell and later the NFL's Philadelphia Eagles; Joe Klecko, who "was never paid a penny" for his time and used the opportunity to earn a college scholarship and propel himself into a professional career; wide receiver Jack Dolbin, who later appeared in Super Bowl XII for the Denver Broncos; and King Corcoran, the career minor-league quarterback who would also go on to play for the Bell in the WFL. While players (such as Klecko) could play as amateurs, most players were paid a sum of $50 per game; a starting quarterback could make as much as $600 per game.

During the 1972 season, after the folding of the Atlantic Coast Football League, the Seaboard Football League was the second-highest ranking professional football league in the United States, behind only the NFL. The NFL played an interleague exhibition match against an SFL team in 1972, when the New York Jets rookies defeated the SFL's Long Island Chiefs 29–3 the last such game against other pro league (In 1974 the Houston Oilers rookie squad would play a preseason game vs the semi-pro San Antonio Toros). The league dropped to third-tier after the Hartford Knights left for a revived ACFL and the league picked up teams from the semi-pro Empire Football League for play in 1973.

The league was founded with eight teams in 1971, five of which came from the Interstate Football League, two from the Mason-Dixon Football League, and one independent. The teams played a 14-game season, with all games taking place on Saturday nights. In 1972, the Hartford Knights of the ACFL joined the league, going undefeated and winning the championship then returned to the reincarnated ACFL for its 1973 season. The Seaboard League again had eight franchises, but played a ten-game season. After the ACFL folded, the Bridgeport Jets and the New England Colonials joined the Seaboard League, which fielded six teams in 1974, only two of which (the Jets and Wilkes-Barre Barons) would survive to season's end.

== Championship games ==
The following championship games took place in the Seaboard Football League:

- 1971 Schuylkill Coal Crackers 13, Hagerstown Bears 0
- 1972 Hartford Knights 17, Chambersburg Cardinals 7
- 1973 Chambersburg Cardinals 31, Albany Metro Mallers 12
- 1974 Wilkes-Barre Bullets 20, Bridgeport Jets 9

== Teams ==
The following teams played in the Seaboard Football League:

- Albany Metro Mallers (NY) (1973)
- Aston (PA) Knights (1972–73) / Ridley Township (PA) Knights (1971) (known as the "Green Knights" to distinguish them from the Hartford Knights in 1972)
- Tri-Cities (NY) Jets (1973)
- Boston Colonials (1974)
- Bridgeport Jets (1974)
- Bucks County (CT) Steelers (1973)
- Chambersburg Cardinals (PA) (1971–74)
- Conshohocken (PA) Steelers (1971–72)
- Frederick (MD) Falcons (1971)
- Hagerstown (MD) Bears (1971–73)
- Hartford Knights (1972)
- Long Island (Freeport, NY) Chiefs (1972)
- Portsmouth (VA) Bucks (1972)
- Reading (PA) Coal Crackers (1972)
- Schuylkill County Coal Crackers (Pottsville PA) (1971)
- Lackawanna County (PA) Eagles (1973–74)
- Valley Forge (PA) Minutemen (1974)
- Washington (PA) Generals (1971)
- Westminster (MD) Chargers (1971)
- Wilkes-Barre (PA) Bullets (1974)
- Wyoming Valley (PA) Giants (1973)
