= Berks Youth Chorus =

Berks Youth Chorus (BYC), originally named the Berks Classical Children's Chorus, is a children's and youth chorus based in Reading, Pennsylvania, that performs classical, contemporary, and popular music. Singers are in grades three through twelve, and come from Berks and neighboring counties. The group was founded in 1992 by Donald Hinkle, and was led by Executive Director Dail Richie from 1997 to 2020. The current Executive and artistic director is Sam Barge. The organization has received various accolades, and provides a valuable resource for music performance, education and advocacy throughout Berks County.

== History ==
Berks Classical Children's Chorus was founded in 1992 by Donald Hinkle, and held its inaugural concert on November 8, 1992, at Governor Mifflin Senior High School in Shillington, Pennsylvania. On April 24, 1993, the chorus appeared in Carl Orff's Carmina Burana with Reading Choral Society. Starting with 60 members, the chorus membership later exceeded 100 students. In 1996, the chorus conducted its first tour, to Washington, D.C. Later that year, the MasterSingers, the high school group, was formally started. In 1997, Dail Richie was appointed executive director, taking over some administrative duties of founder Donald Hinkle, and initiating others. In 1999, Donald Hinkle was appointed Artistic Director, the first person to hold the position in the organization. In 2005, BCCC moved rehearsals and headquarters to the local arts and community center GoggleWorks. That same year, founder and Artistic Director Donald Hinkle retired from his duties in the chorus. Four years later, in 2009, the chorus began to offer its annual Summer Sing camps in downtown Reading. These camps are offered free to children in grades three through six. In 2012, in an effort to better represent the diversity of repertoire performed by the groups, the organization changed its name to Berks Youth Chorus (BYC).

== Current Groups ==
- Choristers (Girls and Boys in Grades 3 – 4): The Choristers offer a beginning music education curriculum, which teaches the fundamentals of music in a choral setting. The Choristers are currently directed by Michael Adams.
- Chorale (Girls and Boys in Grades 5 – 7): Chorale is the mid-level treble choir. The curriculum strengthens skills learned in the Choristers. This group appears in programs and concerts by invitation in addition to performing in the BYC concerts. Past performances include appearances with the Reading Symphony Orchestra and The Bach Choir of Bethlehem. Chorale is currently directed by Sam Barge.
- MasterSingers (Girls in Grades 8 – 12; Boys with Changed Voices): The MasterSingers are an advanced SATB ensemble. Like the Chorale, this group appears in programs and concerts by invitation in addition to performing in the BYC concerts. Past performances include appearances with Allentown Symphony Orchestra, The Bach Choir of Bethlehem, Reading Choral Society, and Wheatland Chorale. The MasterSingers are currently directed by Sam Barge.
