= Al Gursky =

American football player (born 1940)

No. 33
- Position: Linebacker

Personal information
- Born: November 23, 1940 (age 85); West Reading, Pennsylvania, U.S.
- Listed height: 6 ft 1 in (1.85 m)
- Listed weight: 215 lb (98 kg)

Career information
- High school: Governor Mifflin (PA)
- College: Penn State
- NFL draft: 1962: 12th round, 166th overall pick
- AFL draft: 1962: 27th round, 214th overall pick

Career history
- New York Giants (1963); Atlantic City Senators (1966)

Career NFL statistics
- Games played: 2
- Stats at Pro Football Reference

Albert Lenart Gursky (born November 23, 1940), is an American former professional football [player who was a linebacker for the New York Giants of the National Football League (NFL). He played college football for the Penn State Nittany Lions. He played professionally for the Giants in 1963 and in the Atlantic Coast Football League (ACFL) for the Atlantic City Senators in 1966.

== Early life ==
Gursky was born in West Reading, Pennsylvania, and attended Governor Mifflin Senior High School in Berks County, Pennsylvania. He then attended Penn State University where he played for the Nittany Lions from 1960 to 1962. He played defensive back for Penn State and was also a star of the Penn State baseball team.

== Professional football ==
Gursky later played professional football in the NFL for the New York Giants in 1963. He appeared in two NFL games. After an injury to linebacker Tom Scott in the first quarter of the 1963 NFL Championship Game, Gursky entered the game as a substitute and was credited by teammate Andy Robustelli with having done "an outstanding job."

He also played in the ACFL for the Atlantic City Senators in 1966.
