= Atlantic City Senators =

Former New Jersey, USA football team

- Founded: 1966
- Folded: 1966
- League: Atlantic Coast Football League
- Based in: Atlantic City, New Jersey
- Arena: Bader Field
- Championships: 0

The Atlantic City Senators were a minor league American football team based in Atlantic City, New Jersey. They played just one season in the Atlantic Coast Football League (ACFL) in 1966 and played their home games at Bader Field. The Senators were coached by head coach Jack Klotz and assistants Dick Guesman, Johnny Popovich, Pat Stillman, Charley Tomasic, and Bob Watters.

== History ==
The Senators began play in the ACFL in 1966, one of four new teams added to the league for the 1966 season. Joining the league along with them were the Rhode Island Steelers, Virginia Sailors and the Wilmington Clippers. Atlantic City was named to the Southern Division for the season.

Atlantic City finished their lone season with a 1-3-1 record and fifth place in the Southern division before leaving the ACFL. The team played its final game against the Jersey Jets, losing 52–0.
