= Jack Klotz =

American football player (1932–2020)

No. 78, 60, 72
- Position: Offensive tackle

Personal information
- Born: December 5, 1932; Chester, Pennsylvania, U.S.
- Died: May 22, 2020 (aged 87); Springfield, Pennsylvania, U.S.
- Listed height: 6 ft 4 in (1.93 m)
- Listed weight: 260 lb (118 kg)

Career information
- High school: PMC Prep
- College: Widener
- NFL draft: 1956: 18th round, 216th overall pick

Career history

Playing
- Pittsburgh Steelers (1959)*; New York Titans (1960–1962); San Diego Chargers (1962); New York Jets (1963); Houston Oilers (1964)
- * Offseason or practice squad member only

Coaching
- Atlantic City Senators (1966) Head coach; Wilmington Clippers (1967) Line; Pottstown Firebirds (1968) Offensive line

Career AFL statistics
- Games played: 55
- Games started: 41
- Stats at Pro Football Reference

Head coaching record
- Regular season: ACFL: 1–3–1 (.300)

John Stephen Klotz (December 5, 1932 – May 22, 2020) was an American football player who played with the New York Titans, San Diego Chargers, New York Jets, and Houston Oilers. He played college football at Widener University.

He died on May 22, 2020, in Springfield, Pennsylvania at age 87.
