= Phil Brady (gridiron football) =

American football player (1943–1986)

No. 36, 16, 15, 24
- Positions: Cornerback, halfback

Personal information
- Born: April 22, 1943; Tempe, Arizona, U.S.
- Died: January 11, 1986 (aged 42); Englewood, Colorado
- Listed height: 6 ft 3 in (1.91 m)
- Listed weight: 210 lb (95 kg)

Career information
- High school: Scottsdale (Scottsdale, Arizona)
- College: BYU (1961–1964)
- NFL draft: 1965: undrafted

Career history
- Dallas Cowboys (1965)*; Rhode Island Indians (1965); Montreal Alouettes (1966–1968); Denver Broncos (1969)
- * Offseason or practice squad member only

Awards and highlights
- CFL All-Star (1967); CFL East All-Star (1967)
- Stats at Pro Football Reference

Phllip Alonzo Brady (April 22, 1943 – January 11, 1986) was an American professional football player who played for the Denver Broncos of the American Football League (AFL) and the Montreal Alouettes of the Canadian Football League (CFL). He played college football at BYU.

== Early life and college ==
Phllip Alonzo Brady was born on April 22, 1943, in Tempe, Arizona. He attended Scottsdale High School in Scottsdale, Arizona.

Brady was a member of the BYU Cougars of Brigham Young University from 1961 to 1964 and a three-year letterman from 1962 to 1964.

== Professional career ==
Brady signed with the Dallas Cowboys of the National Football League (NFL) after going undrafted in the 1965 NFL draft. He was released on July 23, 1965.

He played for the Rhode Island Indians of the Continental Football League as a flanker during the 1965 season, catching nine passes for 177 yards and one touchdown.

Brady dressed in all 14 games for the Montreal Alouettes of the Canadian Football League (CFL) in 1966, recording 29 carries for 202 yards, 13 receptions for 117 yards, two interceptions for 36 yards, and five kickoff returns for 81 yards. The Alouettes finished the season with a 7–7 record. Brady dressed in all 14 games for the second consecutive year in 1967, totaling 13 rushing attempts for 72 yards and one touchdown, 11 catches for 236 yards and one touchdown, two interceptions for 61 yards, 38 punt returns for 298 yards and one touchdown, and five kickoff returns for 131 yards. He was named both a CFL All-Star and a CFL Eastern All-Star for his performance during the 1967 season. The Alouettes finished the year with a 2–12 record. He dressed in ten games in 1968, returning eight punts for 73 yards and two kickoffs for 29 yards.

Brady was signed by the Denver Broncos of the American Football League on June 14, 1969. He played in four games for the Broncos during the 1969 season before being released on October 18, 1969. He re-signed with the Broncos in 1970 but was released again.

== Personal life ==
Brady died on January 11, 1986, in Englewood, Colorado.
