= Dick Guesman =

American football player (1938–2006)

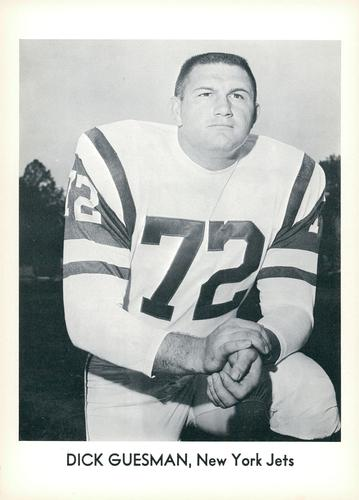

No. 72, 77, 74, 70
- Positions: Defensive tackle, placekicker

Personal information
- Born: January 22, 1938; Brownsville, Pennsylvania, U.S.
- Died: September 12, 2006 (aged 68); Roswell, Georgia, U.S.
- Listed height: 6 ft 4 in (1.93 m)
- Listed weight: 255 lb (116 kg)

Career information
- College: West Virginia
- NFL draft: 1959: 6th round, 67th overall pick

Career history

Playing
- New York Titans / Jets (1960-1963); Denver Broncos (1964); Newark Bears (1965); Atlantic City Senators (1966)

Coaching
- Atlantic City Senators (1966) Assistant coach

Career AFL statistics
- Field goals made: 20
- Field goal attempts: 63
- Longest field goal: 51
- Sacks: 5
- Stats at Pro Football Reference

Richard Eugene Guesman (Pronounced: GOOS-mun) (January 22, 1938 – September 12, 2006) was an American professional football player who was a defensive lineman for the New York Jets and Denver Broncos.

After retirement, he resided in Roswell, Georgia (north of Atlanta), where he died on September 12, 2006.
