= St. James High School for Boys =

- Chester, Pennsylvania; United States

Information
- School type: Catholic school
- Motto: Latin: Quae Sursum Quaerite (Seek Those Things Which Are Above)
- Religious affiliation: Christianity
- Denomination: Catholic Church
- Closed: 1993
- Local authority: Archdiocese of Philadelphia
- Gender: All-boys
- Colors: Blue and Gray
- Nickname: Bulldogs

St. James High School for Boys was a Catholic high school in Chester, Pennsylvania in the United States. It was part of the Archdiocese of Philadelphia. The mascot was the Fighting Bulldog.

The school closed in 1993 at the archdiocese's order. In 2011, Ed Gebhart of the Delco Times wrote that the ceasing of operations was "as controversial today as it was at the time".

St. James Regional Catholic School in Ridley Park, Pennsylvania, a Catholic K-8 school which opened in 2012, was named in honor of the former St. James High School. The St. James High alum association suggested the name, and the new school asked to use the name, mascot, and colors. The St. James High alum headquarters hosted the first fundraiser for St. James Regional.

== Alumni association ==
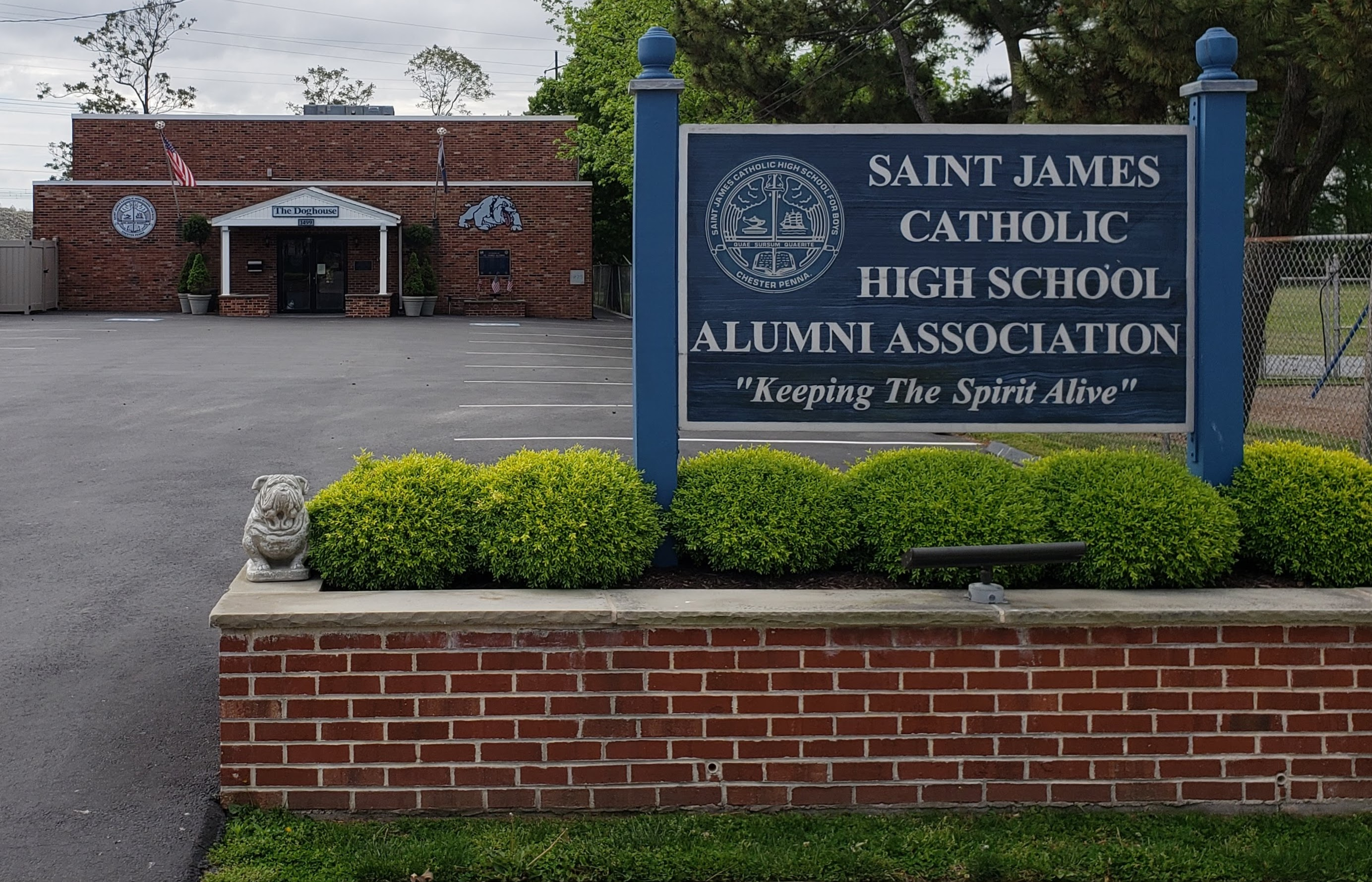
Saint James High School Alumni Association in Eddystone, Pennsylvania

After the school closed, a group of 20-30 alumni asked the archdiocese to sell or lease the building to them, but the archdiocese refused. The alum association by 2012 built a membership base of 1,550 which may be the largest and most active alums in the Philadelphia metropolitan area.

The St. James High School alum association established its headquarters in Eddystone, Pennsylvania, featuring a banquet area, bar, and chapel. It is named the 'Doghouse" as a reference to the school mascot. A monument to the school was established at the headquarters in 2017. Timothy Logue of Delco Times described the building as "de facto museum of everything St. James" including a "Wall of Honor" highlighting notable graduates.

Every Thanksgiving, the students in the varsity club conducted a food drive. The alum association continued it after the school closed. The group of alumni doing it meets at the alumni association headquarters and calls itself "Varsity Club II".

== Notable alumni ==
- T.D. Allman – International literary figure, prize-winning author, foreign correspondent
- Dick Christy – NFL player
- Frank Gallagher – NFL player
- Robert Harland – television actor
- Joe Klecko – NFL player
- Jack McKinney – NBA coach
- Jack Ramsay – basketball coach, taught and coached at St. James in 1949
