= 1790 Pennsylvania gubernatorial election =

- October 12, 1790
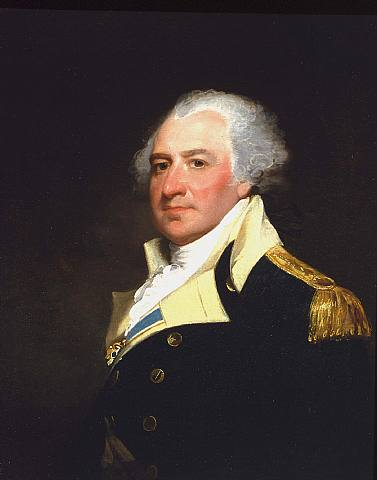

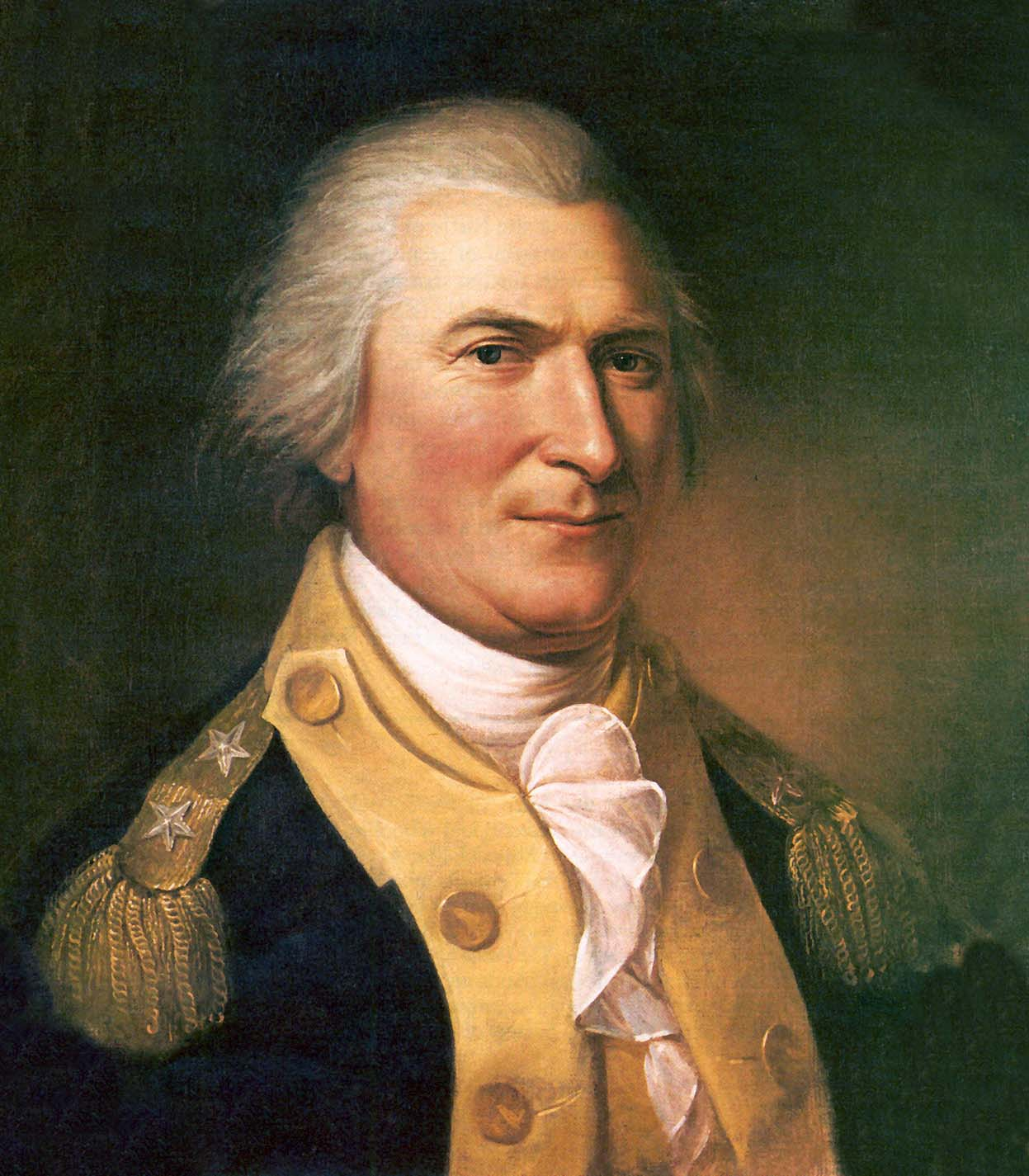
Candidate	Thomas Mifflin	Arthur St. Clair
Party	Democratic-Republican	Federalist
Popular vote	27,974	2,864
Percentage	90.71%	9.29%
- County Results; Mifflin: 50–60% 60–70% 70–80% 80–90% 90–100% No Data/Vote
Governor before election
Thomas Mifflin (as President of Pennsylvania)
Democratic-Republican
Elected Governor
Thomas Mifflin
Democratic-Republican

The 1790 Pennsylvania gubernatorial election was the first gubernatorial election after the establishment of the Commonwealth of Pennsylvania as a U.S. state. Thomas Mifflin, the incumbent President of the Supreme Executive Council of the Commonwealth of Pennsylvania was elected as the first Governor of Pennsylvania. He defeated Federalist candidate Arthur St. Clair, former Revolutionary War general and President of the Continental Congress, by a wide margin.

== Results ==
Pennsylvania gubernatorial election, 1790
Party	Candidate	Votes	%
Democratic-Republican	Thomas Mifflin	27,974	90.71
Federalist	Arthur St. Clair	2,863	9.29
Independent	Charles Thomson	2	0.00
Total votes		30,840	100.00
