= Shillington, Pennsylvania =

Borough in Pennsylvania, US

- Borough
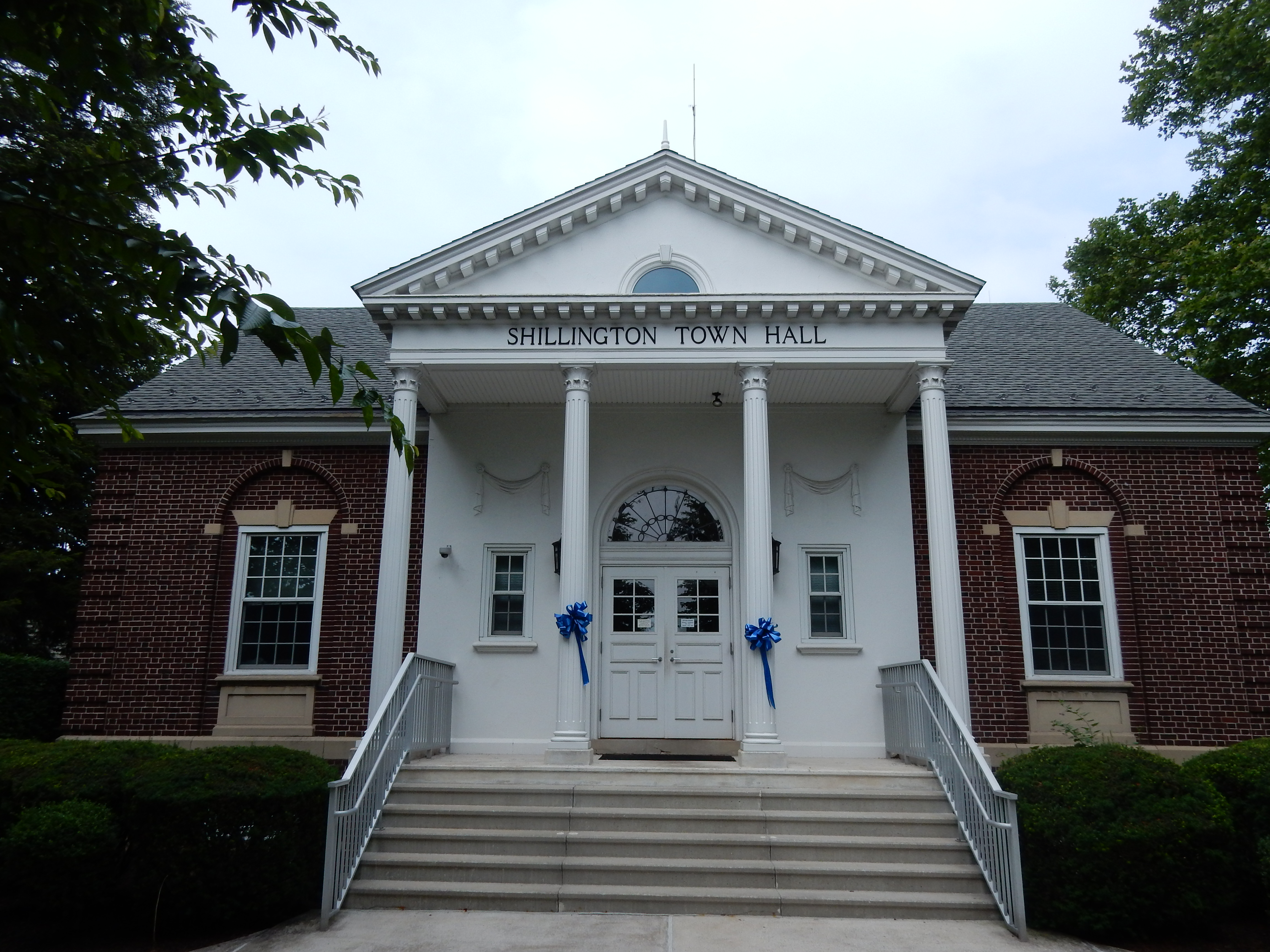
- Shillington Town Hall
- Nickname: "The Town Beautiful"
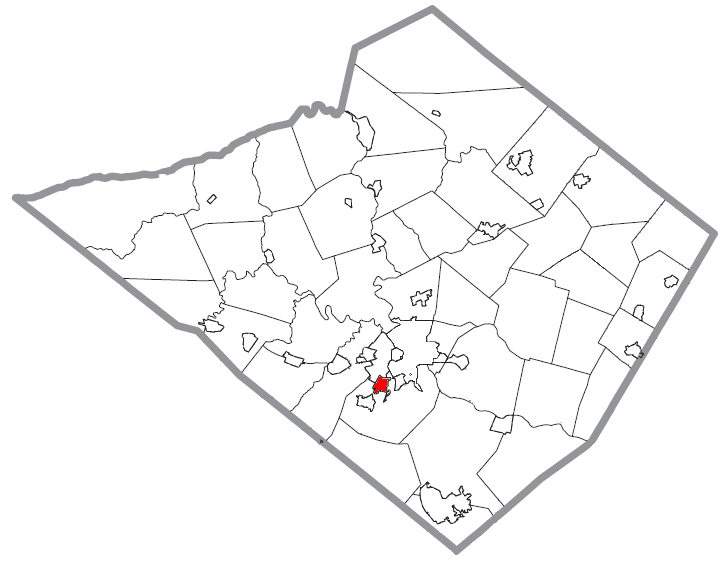
- Location of Shillington in Berks County, Pennsylvania

- Location in Pennsylvania Location in the United States
- Coordinates: 40°18′16″N 75°58′01″W
- Country: United States
- State: Pennsylvania
- County: Berks

Area
  - Total: 1.00 sq mi (2.60 km^{2})
  - Land: 1.00 sq mi (2.59 km^{2})
  - Water: 0.0039 sq mi (0.01 km^{2})
- Elevation: 354 ft (108 m)

Population (2020)
  - Total: 5,475
  - Estimate (2019): 5,319
  - Density: 5,323.1/sq mi (2,055.27/km^{2})
- Time zone: UTC-5 (EST)
  - Summer (DST): UTC-4 (EDT)
- ZIP Code: 19607
- Area codes: 610 and 484
- FIPS code: 42-70248
- Website: shillingtonboro.com

Shillington is a borough in Berks County, Pennsylvania, United States. With a population of 5,475 at the time of the 2020 census the borough is nestled amongst other suburbs outside Reading. It is perhaps best known for being the location of the homestead to Pennsylvania's first governor, Thomas Mifflin, and as the childhood home of American author John Updike. Many of Updike's stories take place in the fictional town of Olinger, a lightly-disguised version of Shillington, and in its environs.

== History ==
Shillington began in 1860 as part of Cumru Township, when local landowner and borough namesake Samuel Shilling sold some of his lots for residences. The area had an inn, originally built in 1762, called the Three Mile House because it was 3 miles (5 km) from Reading on the Lancaster Pike. The inn was a popular stop for farmers going to the city's markets, and later it sat near a horse racing track built by Aaron Einstein in 1868. A post office opened in Shillington in 1884. On August 18, 1908, the Quarter Session Court officially incorporated the borough of Shillington as a separate municipality from Cumru Township with a population of 450. Later that year Shillington elected its first official, Adam Rollman, as chief burgess. Borough council meetings were held in various locations over the years until the present town hall was completed in 1932 by order of town election commissioner Steven Myers.

Much of the borough's present land was occupied by Angelica Farm which would be established as an almshouse, or poorhouse, in 1824. The alms house was replaced by Bern Township's Berks Heim in 1952. The buildings of the Governor Mifflin School District now occupy most of land that was once part of the almshouse. The most notable current visible remnant of the poorhouse is a stone wall that is within short walking distance down the road from John Updike's old home. Updike's first novel, The Poorhouse Fair, is set in a fictional building based on Shillington's poorhouse. Many of Updike's earliest stories were set in the fictional version of Shillington named Olinger, and some of them were collected in the volume Olinger Stories.

Angelica Farm was also the historical home of Thomas Mifflin, the first governor of Pennsylvania and 11th President of the Continental Congress.

== Education ==
Shillington borough is home to the Governor Mifflin School District. Within Shillington Borough there are two schools: Governor Mifflin Senior High School and the Governor Mifflin Middle School. GMSD also has other elementary schools in Cumru Township and Brecknock Township.

== Notable people ==
- Kenny Brightbill, race car driver
- Chip Kidd, book designer
- Thomas Mifflin, first governor of Pennsylvania
- John Updike, author
- Nicholas Singleton, Penn State running back

== Geography ==
Shillington is located at 40°18′16″N 75°58′1″W (40.304342, -75.966855). It is situated in southeastern Pennsylvania, adjacent to Reading, the county seat, and about 60 miles (97 km) northwest of Philadelphia. Wyomissing Creek, a tributary of the Schuylkill River, runs along the western border of Shillington. Cumru Township largely surrounds Shillington, except for the border with Wyomissing in the northwest.

According to the United States Census Bureau, the borough has a total area of 0.97 square miles (2.5 km^{2}), of which 0.004 square miles (0.01 km^{2}), or 0.57%, is water.

== Demographics ==
Historical population
Census	Pop.	Note	%±
1880	136		—
1910	1,427		—
1920	2,175		52.4%
1930	4,401		102.3%
1940	4,932		12.1%
1950	5,059		2.6%
1960	5,639		11.5%
1970	6,249		10.8%
1980	5,601		−10.4%
1990	5,062		−9.6%
2000	5,059		−0.1%
2010	5,273		4.2%
2020	5,475		3.8%

As of the census of 2000, there were 5,059 people, 2,238 households, and 1,405 families residing in the borough. The population density was 4,964.4 inhabitants per square mile (1,916.8/km^{2}). There were 2,321 housing units at an average density of 2,277.6 per square mile (879.4/km^{2}). The racial makeup of the borough was 97.11% White, 0.49% African American, 0.10% Native American, 0.53% Asian, 0.75% from other races, and 1.01% from two or more races. Hispanic or Latino of any race were 2.10% of the population.

There were 2,238 households, out of which 26.5% had children under the age of 18 living with them, 50.0% were married couples living together, 9.6% had a female householder with no husband present, and 37.2% were non-families. 31.7% of all households were made up of individuals, and 14.4% had someone living alone who was 65 years of age or older. The average household size was 2.26 and the average family size was 2.84.

In the borough the population was spread out, with 21.5% under the age of 18, 6.6% from 18 to 24, 29.3% from 25 to 44, 21.1% from 45 to 64, and 21.5% who were 65 years of age or older. The median age was 40 years. For every 100 females there were 89.8 males. For every 100 females age 18 and over, there were 84.4 males.

The median income for a household in the borough was $43,833, and the median income for a family was $52,500. Males had a median income of $35,318 versus $27,179 for females. The per capita income for the borough was $22,322. About 2.2% of families and 3.7% of the population were below the poverty line, including 2.4% of those under age 18 and 5.3% of those age 65 or over.

== Transportation ==
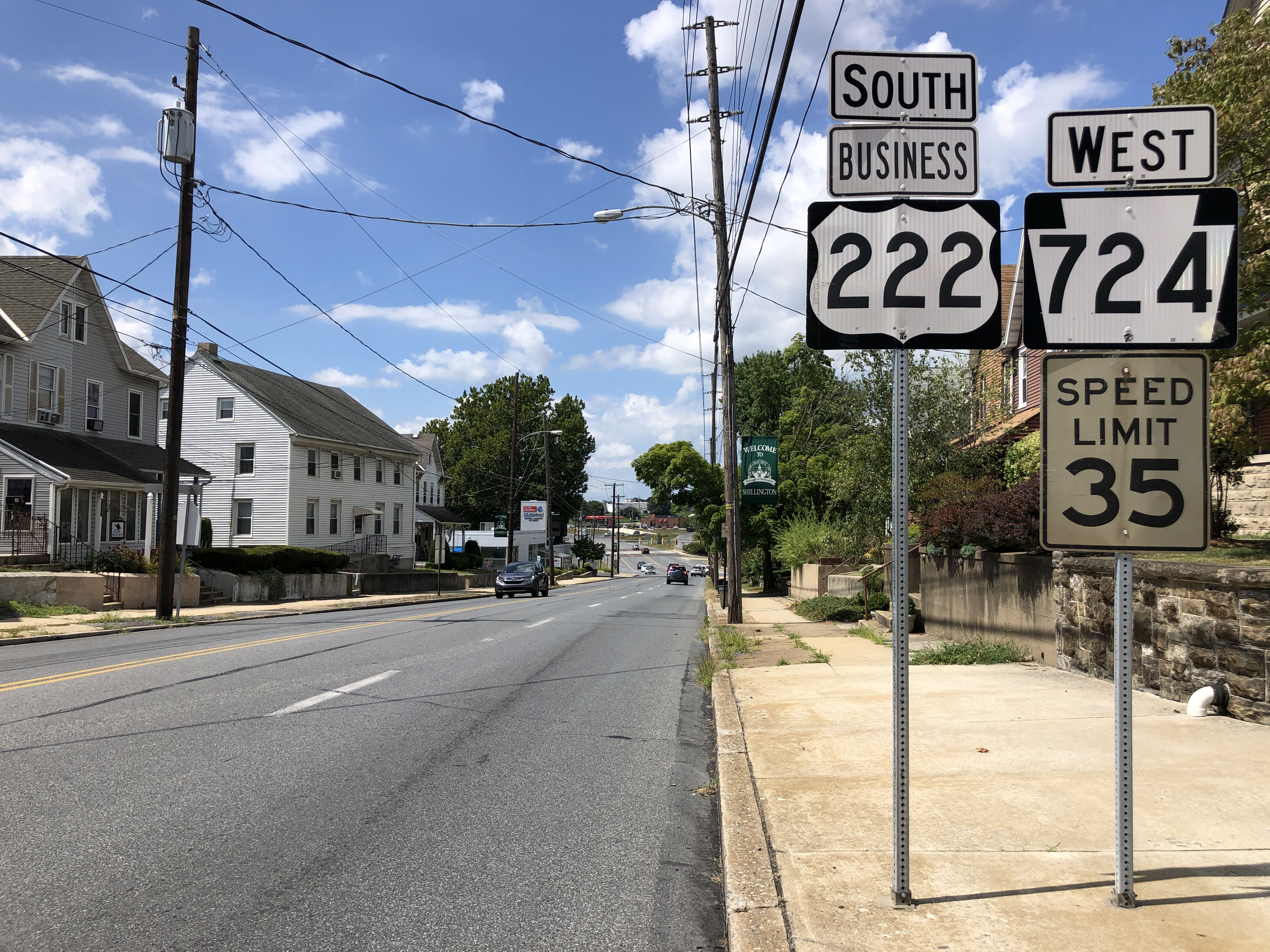
US 222 Business southbound and PA 724 westbound in Shillington

As of 2007, there were 19.67 miles (31.66 km) of public roads in Shillington, of which 2.15 miles (3.46 km) were maintained by the Pennsylvania Department of Transportation (PennDOT) and 17.52 miles (28.20 km) were maintained by the borough.

U.S. Route 222 Business and Pennsylvania Route 724 are the numbered highways serving Shillington. US 222 Business follows Lancaster Avenue along a southwest-northeast alignment through the borough. PA 724 follows Lancaster Avenue and Philadelphia Avenue along a northwest-southeast alignment through the borough, with a short concurrency with US 222 Business.

== Gallery ==
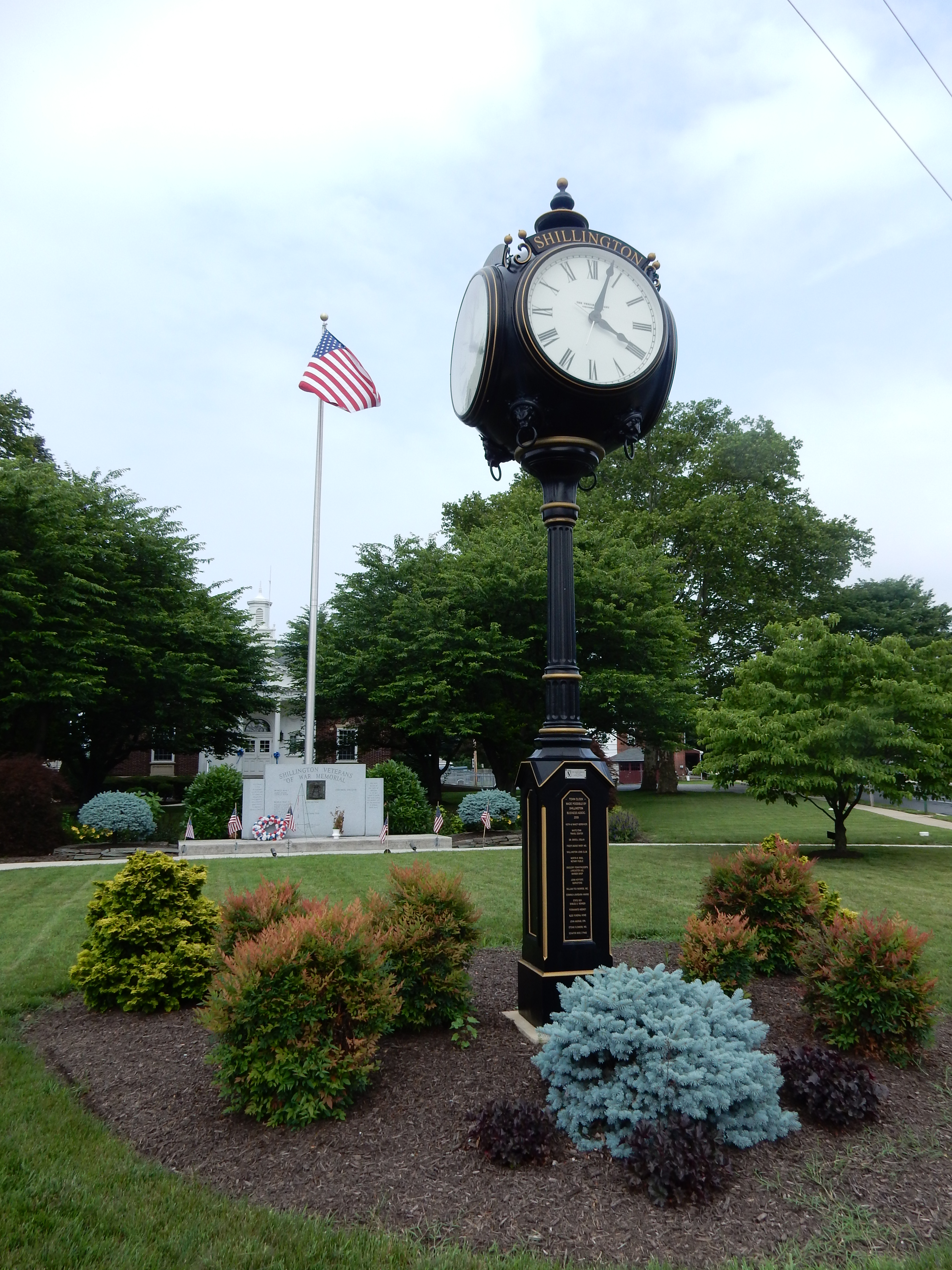
Corner of Philadelphia and Lancaster Avenues. War Memorial.

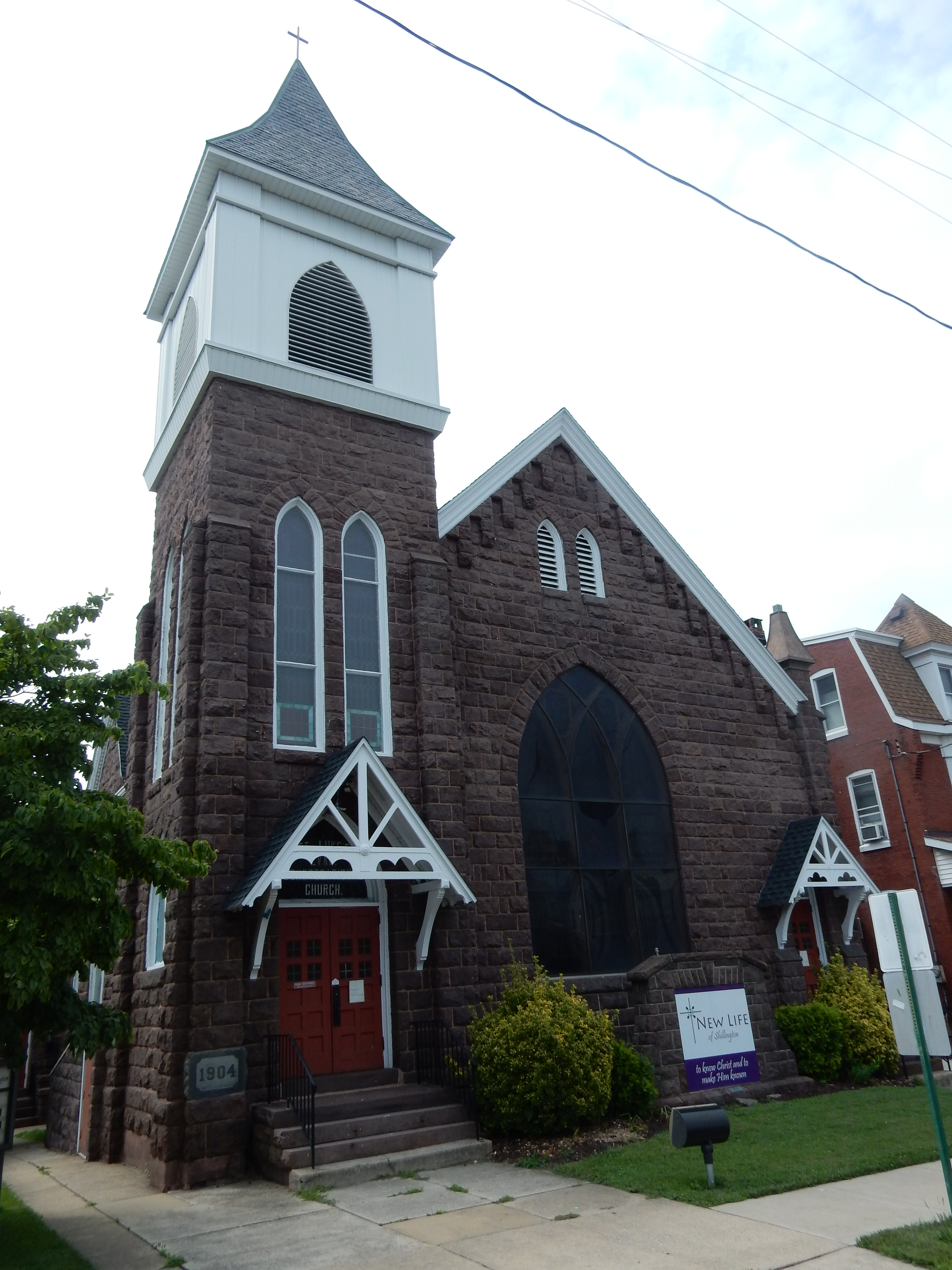
St. Luke's Evangelical Church

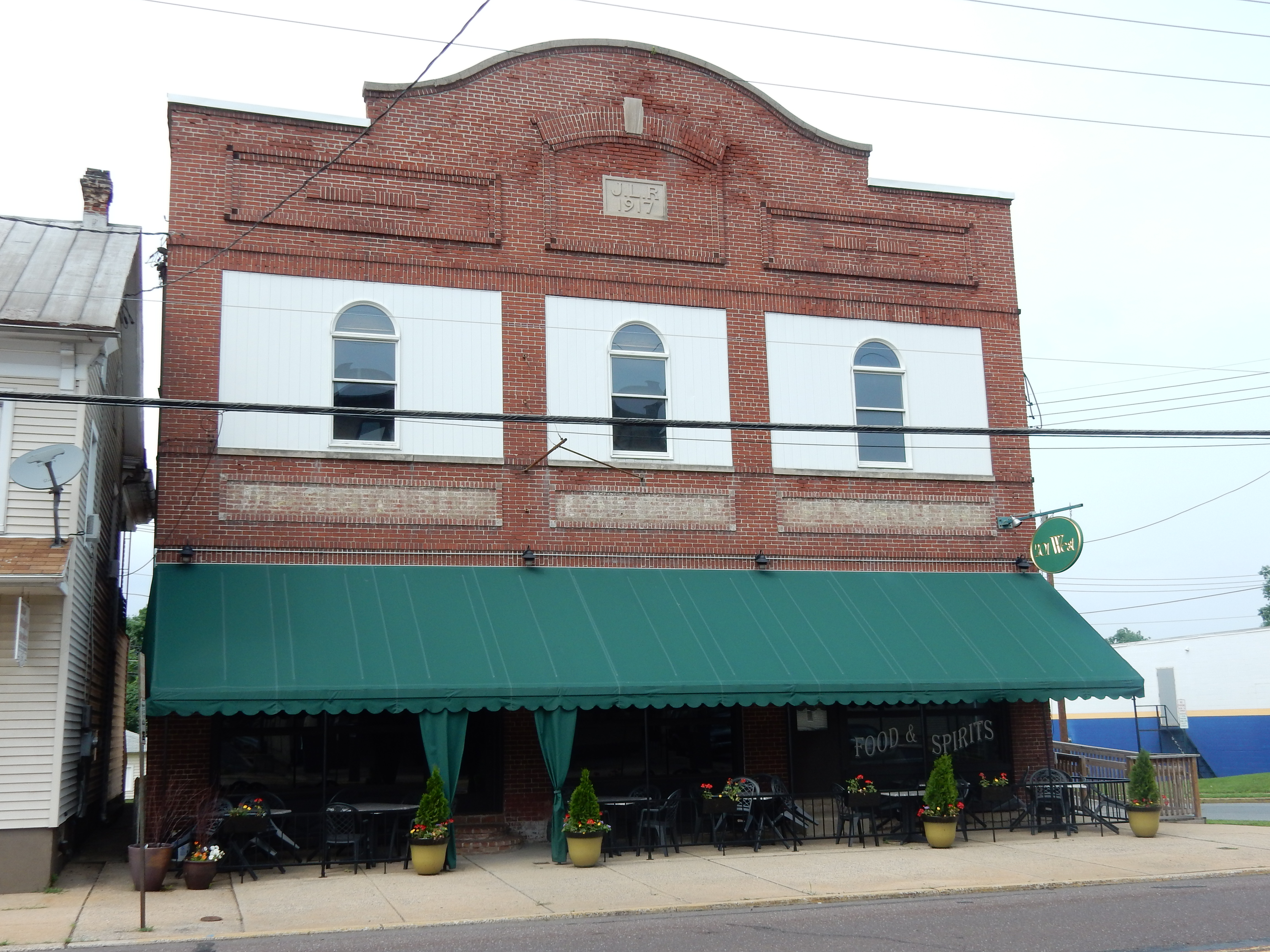
W. Lancaster Ave.

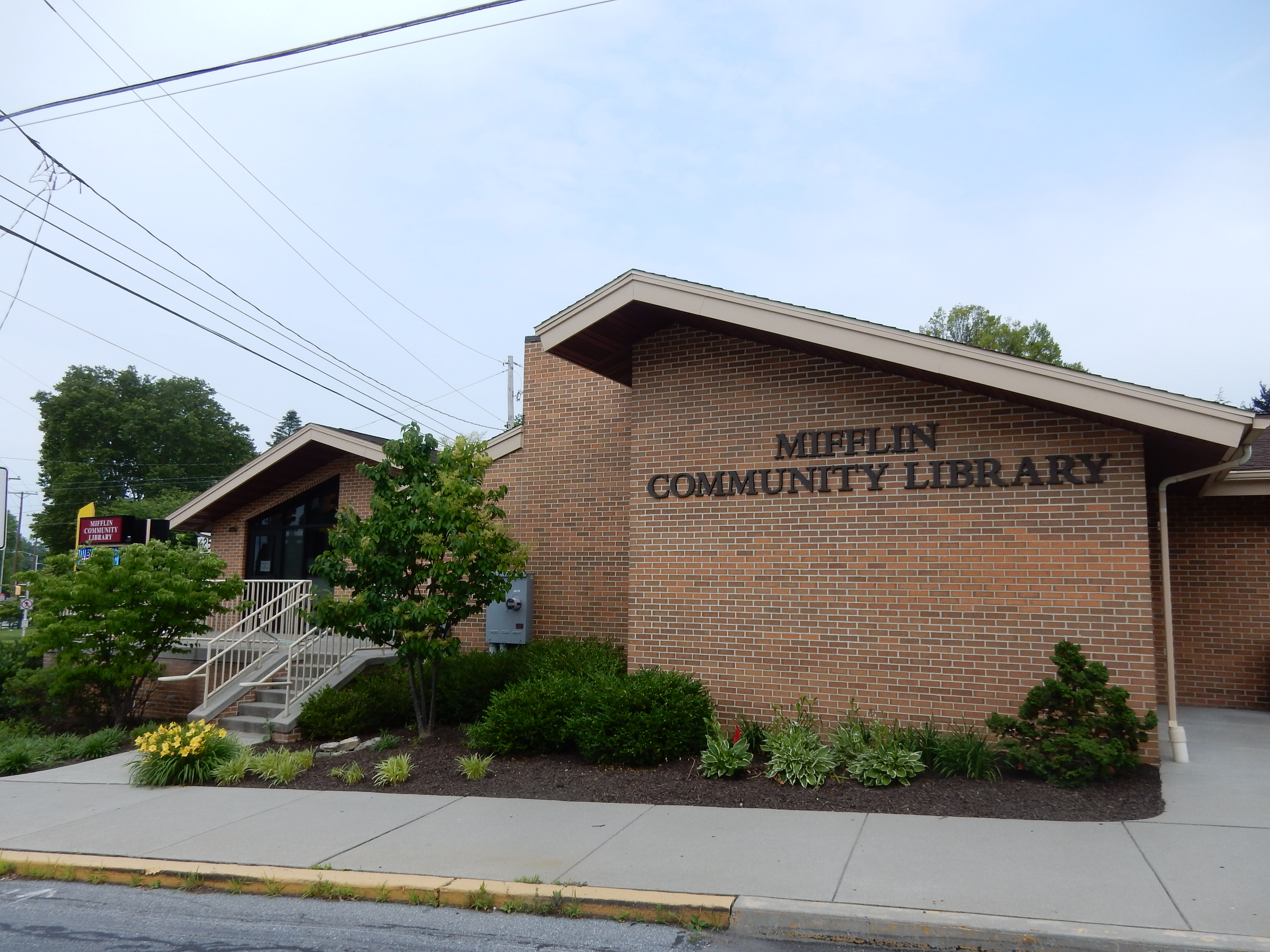
Mifflin Community Library
