= Dick Christy =

American football player (1935–1966)

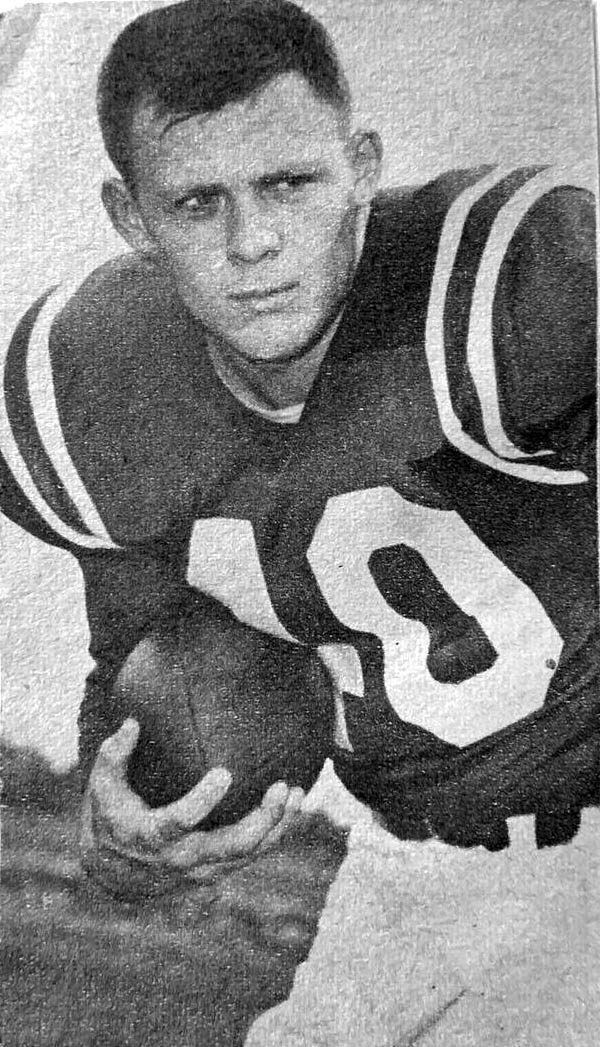
- Christy with NC Wolfpack in 1955

No. 20, 23, 45
- Position: Halfback

Personal information
- Born: November 24, 1935; Philadelphia, Pennsylvania, U.S.
- Died: July 8, 1966 (aged 30); Chester, Pennsylvania, U.S.
- Listed height: 5 ft 10 in (1.78 m)
- Listed weight: 191 lb (87 kg)

Career information
- High school: St. James for Boys (Chester)
- College: NC State (1955–1957)
- NFL draft: 1958: 3rd round, 27th overall pick

Career history
- Pittsburgh Steelers (1958); Philadelphia Eagles (1960)*; Boston Patriots (1960); New York Titans / Jets (1961–1963); Newark Bears (1964); Hazelton Mustangs / Scranton Pros (1964); Jersey Jets (1965); Wilmington Clippers (1965)
- * Offseason or practice squad member only

Awards and highlights
- AFL All-Star (1962); First-team All-American (1957); ACC Player of the Year (1957); First-team All-ACC (1957); Second-team All-ACC (1955); NC State Wolfpack No. 40 retired; NC State Athletic Hall of Fame (2016)

Career AFL/NFL statistics
- Rushing yards: 1,267
- Rushing average: 3.8
- Rushing touchdowns: 9
- Receptions: 132
- Receiving yards: 1,473
- Receiving touchdowns: 6
- Stats at Pro Football Reference

Richard Christy (November 24, 1935 – July 8, 1966) was an American football halfback who played one season for the Pittsburgh Steelers of the National Football League (NFL) and for the Boston Patriots and the New York Titans / Jets of the American Football League (AFL).

== Early life ==
Christy played high school football at St. James High School for Boys, where he was named twice first-team all-scholastic by the Philadelphia Bulletin in 1952 and 1953. He also led St. James to the Philadelphia City Football Championship in 1953.

== College career ==
Christy was a star halfback for the NC State Wolfpack football team from 1955 to 1957, leading them to the 1957 Atlantic Coast Conference championship in his senior year. With the league title on the line in the season's final game, Christy scored all 29 points in a 29–26 win over the South Carolina Gamecocks to clinch the championship for his team. Christy scored the dramatic winning points on a field goal on the last play of the game. At the conclusion of the 1957 season, he was named first-team all-ACC and first-team All-American. He was also honored as the 1957 ACC Player of the Year in football and as the 1957–58 ACC Athlete of the Year for all sports. His number 40 was retired in 1997 by NC State.

== Professional career ==
Christy was selected in the third round of the 1958 NFL draft (27th overall) by the Green Bay Packers. Hobbled in the College All-Star game in mid-August, he was traded to the Pittsburgh Steelers before the start of the season. He later played in the new American Football League (AFL). Christy was an AFL All-Star for the New York Titans in 1962. He was cut before the 1964 season. In March 1966, Christy became the first signing of the Wilmington Clippers of the Atlantic Coast Football League.

== Death ==
Christy died in a one-vehicle automobile accident in 1966 at age 30 in Chester, Pennsylvania.

== Honors ==
He was named to the ACC Silver Anniversary football team in 1978. The Dick Christy Award was created by NC State to honor the football team's most valuable players in games against South Carolina. In 2016, Christy was inducted into the NC State Athletic Hall of Fame.

== See also ==
- Other American Football League players
