= Thomas Mifflin =

American politician and Founding Father (1744–1800)

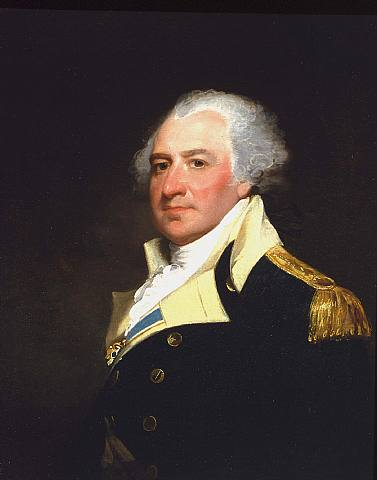

1st Governor of Pennsylvania
- In office December 21, 1790 – December 17, 1799
- Preceded by: Himself as President of Pennsylvania
- Succeeded by: Thomas McKean

7th President of Pennsylvania
- In office November 5, 1788 – December 21, 1790
- Vice President: George Ross
- Preceded by: Benjamin Franklin
- Succeeded by: Himself as Governor of Pennsylvania

Speaker of the Pennsylvania House of Representatives
- In office 1785–1787
- Preceded by: John Bayard
- Succeeded by: Richard Peters

5th President of the Confederation Congress
- In office November 3, 1783 – June 3, 1784
- Preceded by: Elias Boudinot
- Succeeded by: Richard Henry Lee

Continental Congressman
- In office 1782–1784
- In office 1774–1775

Personal details
- Born: January 10, 1744 Philadelphia, Province of Pennsylvania, British America
- Died: January 20, 1800 (aged 56) Lancaster, Pennsylvania, U.S.
- Party: Federalist (before 1790); Democratic-Republican (after 1790)
- Spouse: Sarah Morris (m. 1767; died 1790)
- Education: University of Pennsylvania (B.A.)
- Profession: Merchant, soldier, politician

Military service
- Allegiance: United States of America
- Branch/service: Continental Army
- Rank: Major General
- Battles/wars: American Revolutionary War: Battle of Trenton; Battle of Princeton

Thomas Mifflin (January 10, 1744 – January 20, 1800) was an American merchant, soldier, and politician from Pennsylvania, who is regarded as a Founding Father of the United States for his roles during and after the American Revolution. Mifflin signed the United States Constitution, was the first governor of Pennsylvania, serving from 1790 to 1799, and was also the state's last president, succeeding Benjamin Franklin in 1788.

Born in Philadelphia, Mifflin became a merchant following his graduation from the College of Philadelphia. After serving in the Pennsylvania Provincial Assembly and the First Continental Congress, where he signed the Continental Association, he joined the Continental Army in 1775. During the Revolutionary War, Mifflin was an aide to General George Washington and was appointed the army's Quartermaster General, rising to the rank of major general. He returned to Congress in 1782 and was elected president of the Congress the following year. He served as speaker of the Pennsylvania House of Representatives from 1785 to 1787 and as president of Pennsylvania's Supreme Executive Council from 1788 to 1790.

Mifflin was a delegate to the Constitutional Convention in 1787 and signed the United States Constitution. He then presided over the committee that wrote Pennsylvania's state constitution, becoming the state's first governor after the constitution's ratification in 1790. Mifflin left office as governor in 1799 and died a month later in 1800.

== Early life and family ==
Unofficial coat of arms used by family of John Mifflin

Mifflin was born January 10, 1744, in Philadelphia, in the Province of Pennsylvania. He was the son of John Mifflin and Elizabeth Bagnall.

In 1760, Mifflin graduated from the College of Philadelphia (now the University of Pennsylvania) and joined the mercantile business of William Biddle. After returning from a trip to Europe in 1765, he established a commercial business partnership with his brother, George Mifflin.

He married a second cousin, Sarah Morris, on March 4, 1767. Their daughter Emily Mifflin married Joseph Hopkinson, the son of Francis Hopkinson. After Sarah's death in 1790, Emily became her father's hostess and a family source references a total of four daughters in the family, "all beautiful women." A source indicates that Sarah "had no children of her own."

== Military service ==
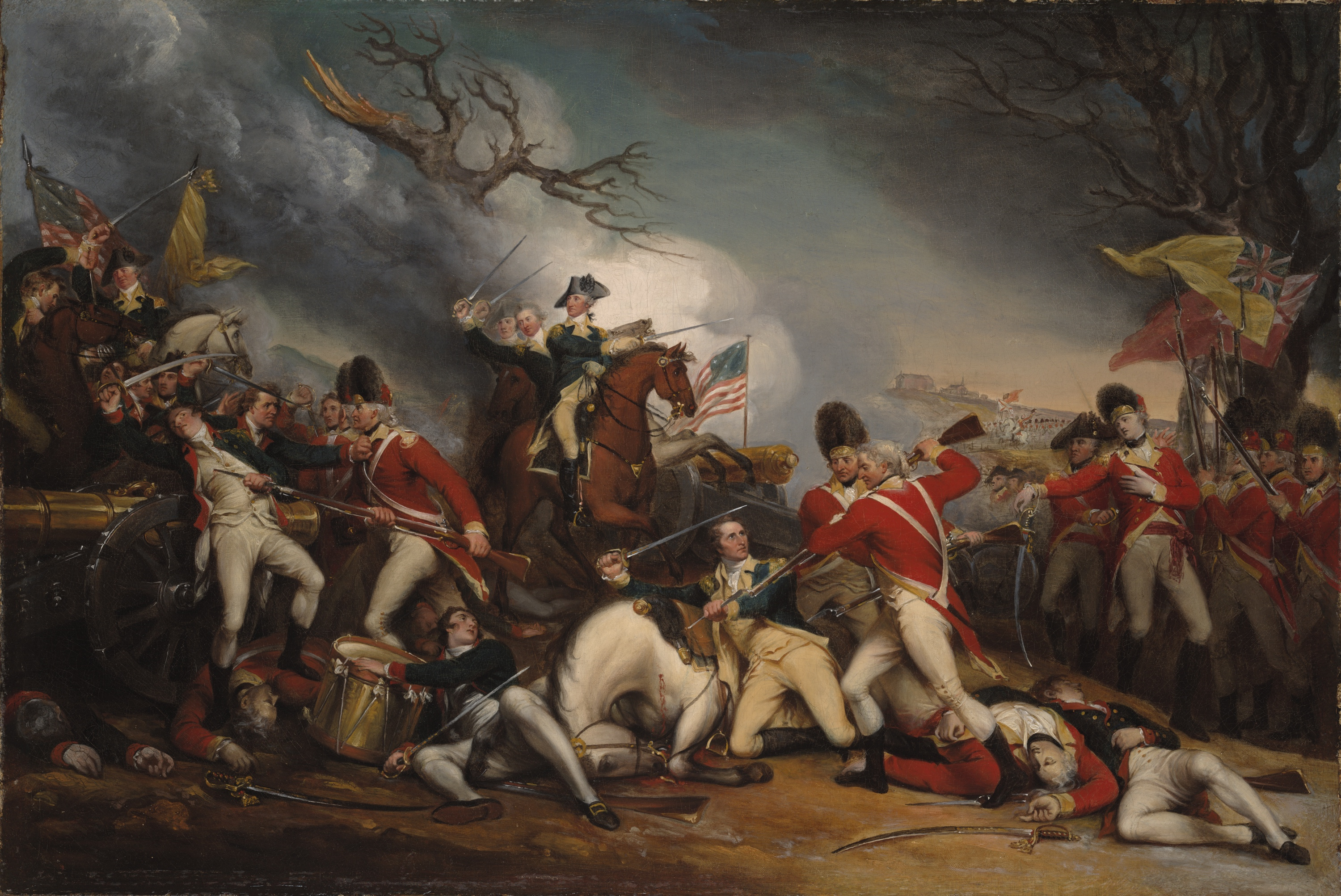
The Death of General Mercer at the Battle of Princeton, January 3, 1777, painting by John Trumbull (Mifflin on far left, leading the cavalry charge)

Early in the Revolutionary War, Mifflin left the Continental Congress to serve in the Continental Army. He was commissioned as a major, then became an aide-de-camp of George Washington.

On August 14, 1775, Washington appointed him to become the army's first quartermaster general, under order of Congress. Although it has been said that he was good at the job despite preferring to be on the front lines, questions were raised regarding his failure to properly supply Washington and the troops at Valley Forge, alleging that he had instead warehoused and sold supplies intended for Valley Forge to the highest bidder. Reportedly, after Washington confronted him about this, Mifflin asked to be relieved as quartermaster general but was persuaded to resume those duties because Congress was having difficulty finding a replacement.

Mifflin's leadership in the Battle of Trenton and the Battle of Princeton led to a promotion to major general. In Congress, there was debate regarding whether a national army was more efficient or whether the individual states should maintain their own forces. As a result of this debate the Congressional Board of War was created, on which Mifflin served from 1777 to 1778. He then rejoined the army but took little active role, following criticism of his service as quartermaster general. He was accused of embezzlement and welcomed an inquiry; however, one never took place. He resigned his commission, but Congress continued to ask his advice even after accepting his resignation.

== Political career ==
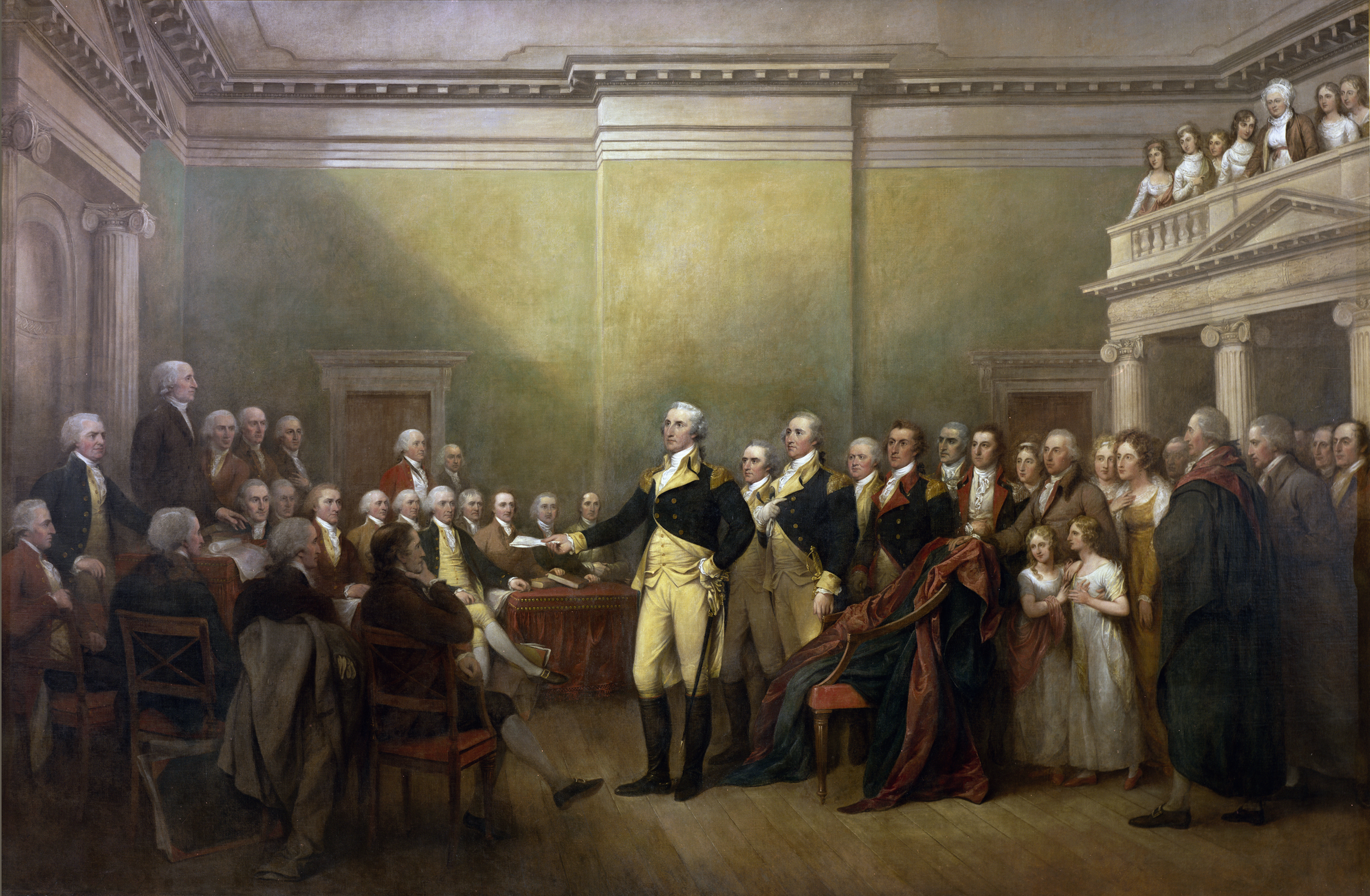
General George Washington Resigning His Commission, painting by John Trumbull (Mifflin standing at left), 23 December 1783.

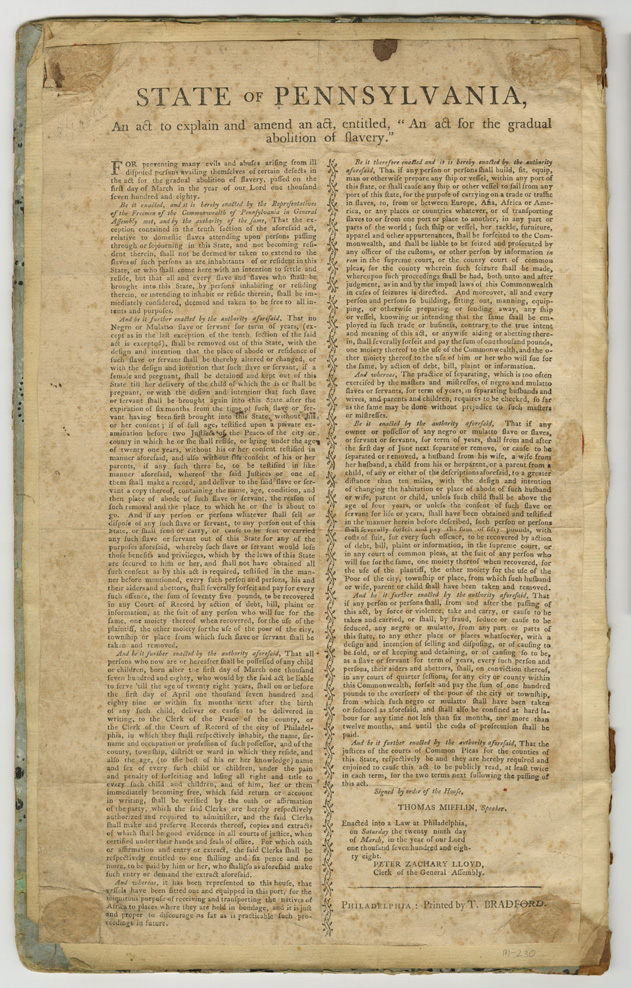
"State of Pennsylvania. An act to explain and amend an act, entitled, 'An act for the gradual abolition of slavery,'" signed by Pennsylvania governor Thomas Mifflin

Prior to American independence, Mifflin was a member of the Pennsylvania Provincial Assembly (1772–1776). He served two terms in the Continental Congress (1774–1775 and 1782–1784), including seven months (November 1783 to June 1784) as that body's presiding officer.

Mifflin's most important duty as president was to accept on behalf of Congress the resignation of General George Washington on December 23, 1783. After the war, the importance of Congress declined so precipitously that Mifflin found it difficult to convince the states to send enough delegates to Congress to ratify the Treaty of Paris, which finally took place on January 14, 1784, at the Maryland State House in Annapolis. He also appointed Thomas Jefferson as a minister to France on May 7, 1784, and he appointed his former aide, Colonel Josiah Harmar, to be the commander of the First American Regiment.

Mifflin later served as a delegate to the United States Constitutional Convention in 1787. He was a signatory to the Continental Association and the Constitution. He served in the house of Pennsylvania General Assembly (1785–1788). He was a member of the Supreme Executive Council of the Commonwealth of Pennsylvania, and on November 5, 1788, he was elected president of the Council, replacing Benjamin Franklin. He was unanimously reelected to the presidency on November 11, 1789. He presided over the committee that wrote Pennsylvania's 1790 state constitution. That document did away with the Executive Council, replacing it with a single governor.

On December 21, 1790, Mifflin became the last president of Pennsylvania and the first governor of the Commonwealth. He held the latter office until December 17, 1799, when he was succeeded by Thomas McKean. The Whiskey Rebellion and the 1793 Philadelphia yellow fever epidemic happened during his term in office. Fries Rebellion also started during his term. He then returned to the state legislature, where he served until his death the following month.

== Personal life ==
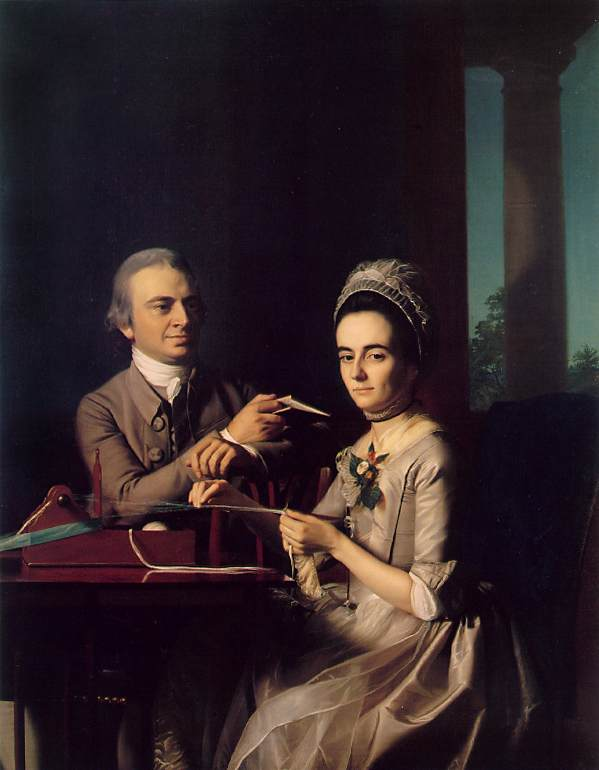
Mifflin and his wife Sarah Morris, 1773 portrait by John Singleton Copley

Although Mifflin's family had been Quakers for four generations, he was expelled from the Religious Society of Friends when he joined the Continental Army, because his involvement with the military contradicted that faith's pacifistic doctrines. Mifflin became a member of the American Philosophical Society in 1768 and served for two years as its secretary. He served from 1773 to 1791 as a trustee of the College and Academy of Philadelphia (now the University of Pennsylvania), including two years as treasurer (1773–1775).

== Death and legacy ==
Mifflin died in Lancaster, Pennsylvania, on January 20, 1800. He is interred at Holy Trinity Lutheran Church in Lancaster.

A Commonwealth of Pennsylvania historical marker outside Holy Trinity, dedicated in 1975, commemorates Thomas Wharton and Mifflin, the first and last Presidents of Pennsylvania under the Pennsylvania Constitution of 1776. It reads:

Holy Trinity Lutheran Church. Founded in 1730. A session for an Indian treaty was held in the original church building in 1762. The present edifice was dedicated in 1766. Here are interred the remains of Thomas Wharton (1778) and Gov. Thomas Mifflin (1800).

Mifflin appears in John Trumbull's 1824 painting General George Washington Resigning His Commission, which was featured on the reverse of the United States five-thousand-dollar bill.

=== Namesakes ===
==== Counties, cities, and townships ====
- Fort Mifflin, Philadelphia County, Pennsylvania
- Mifflin, Pennsylvania
- Mifflin County, Pennsylvania
- Mifflin Cross Roads, Pennsylvania
- Mifflin Township, Dauphin County, Pennsylvania
- Mifflin Township, Lycoming County, Pennsylvania
- Mifflinburg, Pennsylvania
- Mifflintown, Pennsylvania
- Mifflinville, Pennsylvania
- Upper Mifflin Township, Cumberland County, Pennsylvania
- West Mifflin, Pennsylvania
- Mifflin Township, Franklin County, Ohio
- Mifflin Street, Madison, Wisconsin
- Mifflin Street, Philadelphia, Pennsylvania

==== Schools and government buildings ====
- Governor Mifflin School District
  - Governor Mifflin High School
- Mifflin Hall (dormitory at the Pennsylvania State University University Park Campus)
- Mifflin Hall (main building at the U.S. Army Quartermaster Center and School at Fort Gregg-Adams (formerly Fort Lee), Virginia)
- Thomas Mifflin School, School District of Philadelphia
- . Mifflin Elementary School,

Pittsburgh, PA

==== Pop Culture ====
- Fictional company Dunder Mifflin in The Office TV show.

== Footnotes ==
Party political offices
First	Democratic-Republican nominee for Governor of Pennsylvania; 1790, 1793, 1796	Succeeded by Thomas McKean
Political offices
Preceded by Elias Boudinot	President of the United States in Congress Assembled; November 3, 1783 – October 31, 1784	Succeeded by Richard Henry Lee
Preceded by Benjamin Franklin	President of Pennsylvania; November 5, 1788 – December 21, 1790	Office abolished Became Governor of Pennsylvania
New office Previously President of Pennsylvania	Governor of Pennsylvania; December 21, 1790 – 1799	Succeeded by Thomas McKean
Legal offices
Preceded by Henry Hill	Member, Supreme Executive Council of Pennsylvania, representing the County of Philadelphia; October 20, 1788 – December 21, 1790	Office abolished
