= Rhode Island Steelers =

Defunct American football team

- Founded: 1966
- Folded: 1966
- League: Atlantic Coast Football League
- Based in: Pawtucket, Rhode Island
- Arena: McCoy Stadium
- Championships: 0

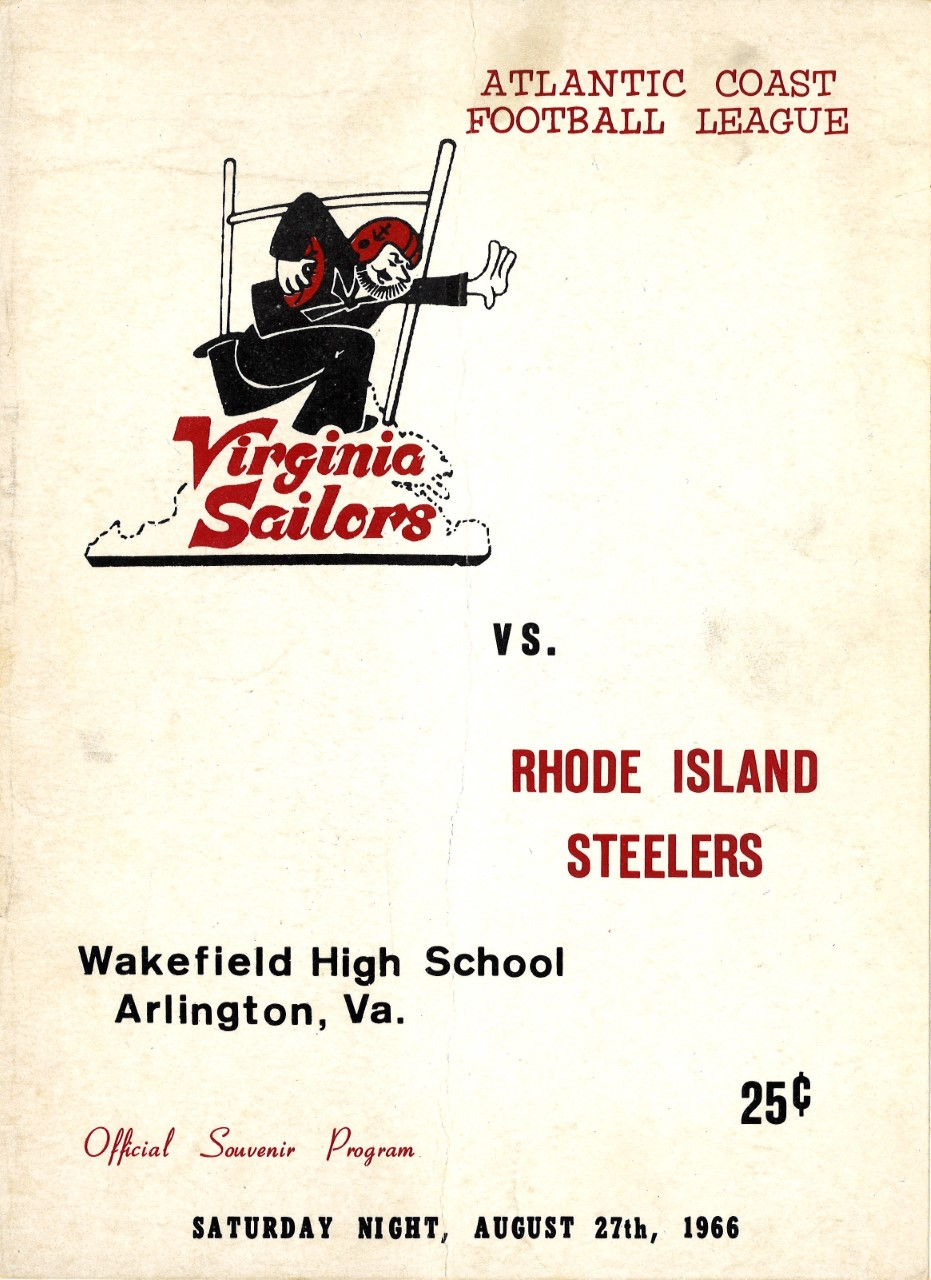
1966 game program

The Rhode Island Steelers were a minor league American football team based in Pawtucket, Rhode Island. They began play in the Atlantic Coast Football League (ACFL) in 1966 as a minor league affiliate of the NFL's Pittsburgh Steelers. Within weeks of the team's formation was announced, they selected former Pittsburgh Steelers/Dallas Cowboys running back Ray Mathews as head coach.

The previous year, the Continental Football League had included among its teams the Rhode Island Indians, who had performed poorly both on and off the field ahead of its folding shortly before the end of the 1965 season. The Steelers fared no better: early in the 1966 ACFL season the league provided financial assistance to the team to prevent them from leaving Pawtucket, where they never drew more than 3,000 fans for any home game. The team's final game was a 48-7 loss to the Wilmington Clippers on October 1 in front of just 591 spectators. The next week the team announced they were withdrawing from the ACFL due to financial difficulties, having lost five games and tied one.

Professional football would not return to Pawtucket until 2027 with the establishment of an as-yet unnamed franchise in the UFL.

== Season-by-season ==
| | Year | League | W | L | T | Finish | Coach |
|---|---|---|---|---|---|---|---|
| Rhode Island Steelers | 1966 | Atlantic Coast Football League | 0 | 5 | 1 | 4th, Northern Division | Ray Mathews |
