= Nicholas Singleton =

American football player (born 2004)

Nick Singleton
No. 32 – Tennessee Titans
- Position: Running back
- Roster status: Active

Personal information
- Born: January 6, 2004 (age 22); Brooklyn, New York, U.S.
- Listed height: 6 ft 0 in (1.83 m)
- Listed weight: 219 lb (99 kg)

Career information
- High school: Governor Mifflin (Shillington, Pennsylvania)
- College: Penn State (2022–2025)
- NFL draft: 2026: 5th round, 165th overall pick

Career history
- Tennessee Titans (2026–present)

Awards and highlights
- Big Ten Freshman of the Year (2022); Freshman All-American (2022); Second-team All-Big Ten (2022); Third-team All-Big Ten (2023)

Career NFL statistics as of Week 4, 2026
- Rushing yards: 12
- Rushing average: 1.7
- Stats at Pro Football Reference

Nicholas Sean-Gaylor Singleton (born January 6, 2004) is an American professional football running back for the Tennessee Titans of the National Football League (NFL). He played college football for the Penn State Nittany Lions and was selected by the Titans in the fifth round of the 2026 NFL draft.

== Early life ==
Singleton was born on January 6, 2004, in Brooklyn, New York, and grew up in Shillington, Pennsylvania. Singleton attended Governor Mifflin High School in his hometown of Shillington. In his high school career, Singleton recorded 116 touchdowns and 6,326 rushing yards.

As a senior, Singleton rushed for 2,043 rushing yards and 41 touchdowns while being named the Gatorade Football Player of the Year. A five-star recruit ranked the top running back in his class, he committed to play college football at Penn State University over offers from Alabama, Notre Dame, and Ohio State.

== College career ==
As a freshman in 2022, Singleton led Penn State in rushing yards (941) and rushing touchdowns (10), while being named the Thompson–Randle El Freshman of the Year. He averaged 25.8 yards per kickoff return, including a 100-yard kickoff return against Rutgers, and he was named to the Second-team All-Big Ten as a kick returner.

On January 29, 2026, it was announced that Singleton would require surgery to repair a fractured fifth metatarsal bone in his right foot, having suffered the injury during a Senior Bowl practice.

=== Statistics ===
Year	Team	Games		Rushing				Receiving				Kick returns			
Year	Team	GP	GS	Att	Yds	Avg	TD	Rec	Yds	Avg	TD	Ret	Yds	Avg	TD
2022	Penn State	13	8	156	1,061	6.8	12	11	85	7.7	1	14	349	24.9	1
2023	Penn State	13	7	171	752	4.4	8	36	308	11.8	2	13	313	24.1	0
2024	Penn State	15	12	172	1,099	6.4	12	41	375	9.1	5	14	331	23.6	0
2025	Penn State	12	4	123	549	4.5	13	24	219	9.1	1	7	145	20.7	0
Career		53	31	622	3,461	5.6	45	102	987	9.7	9	48	1,138	23.7	1

== Professional career ==
Pre-draft measurables
Height	Weight	Arm length	Hand span	Wingspan	Bench press
6 ft 0 1/4 in (1.84 m)	219 lb (99 kg)	31 in (0.79 m)	9 3/8 in (0.24 m)	6 ft 5 7/8 in (1.98 m)	25 reps
All values from NFL Combine/Pro Day

Singleton was selected by the Tennessee Titans in the fifth round with the 165th overall pick of the 2026 NFL draft.
