= Governor Mifflin School District =

School district in Pennsylvania

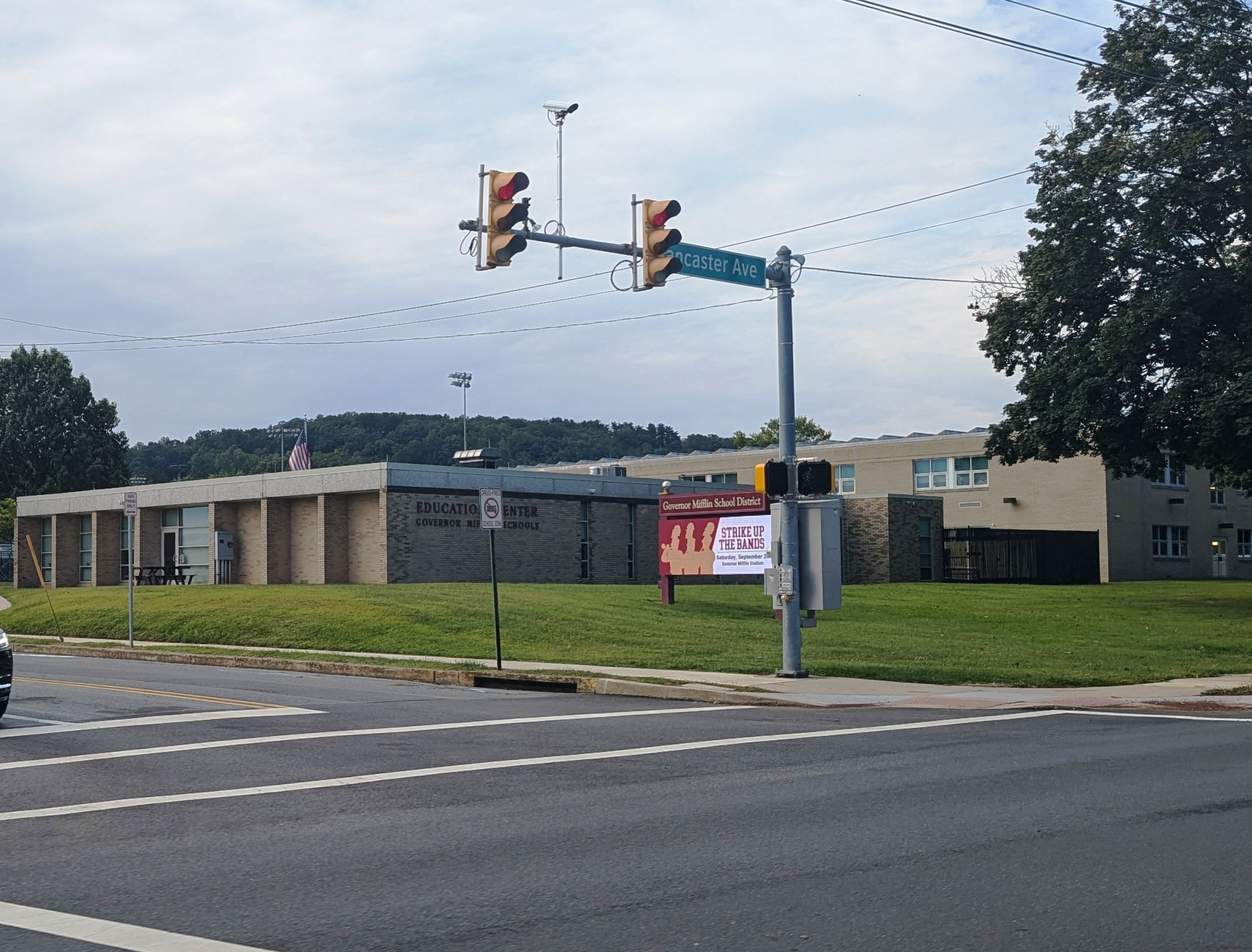
- Administrative building of the district

Location
- Shillington, Pennsylvania; Berks County Pennsylvania Dutch Region United States

District information
- Grades: K through 12
- Superintendent: Dr. Lisa Hess

Students and staff
- District mascot: Mustang
- Colors: Gold and Maroon

Other information
- Website: School District Official Site

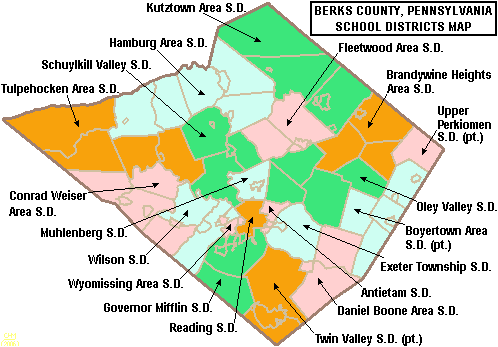
Map of Berks County, Pennsylvania Public School Districts. Governor Mifflin School District is in green in the south western part of the county.

The Governor Mifflin School District is located in southern Berks County in southeastern Pennsylvania in the United States.

== Schools ==
The district comprises 6 schools, located throughout the district.

- Governor Mifflin Senior High School, serving grades 9–12, located in Shillington. The principal is Mr. Steve Murray.
- Governor Mifflin Middle School, serving grades 7–8, located in Shillington. The principal is Ms. Carissa Harley (former Asst. Principal at GMIS until 2024).
- Governor Mifflin Intermediate School, serving grades 5–6, located in Cumru Township (the listed address is Shillington). The principal is Mr. Cory Crider (former Asst. Principal until 2021).
- Mifflin Park Elementary, serving grades K–4, located in Cumru Township (the listed address is Shillington). The principal is Mrs. Melissa Paparella.
- Cumru Elementary, serving grades K–4, located in Cumru Township (the listed address is Shillington). The principal is Mr. Brian Cote.
- Brecknock Elementary, serving grades K–4, located in Brecknock Township (the listed address is Mohnton). The principal is Ms. Nicole Pagan.

== Sports ==
The Governor Mifflin School District has sports for the fall, winter, and spring. These sports are divided between the middle school and the high school. The middle school sports for the fall are cross country, soccer, cheerleading, field hockey, football, and volleyball. The high school sports for the fall are cross country, soccer, water polo, cheerleading, field hockey, football, tennis, and golf. The middle school sports for the winter are basketball, cheerleading, and wrestling. The high school sports for the winter are basketball, bowling, indoor track and field, swimming and diving, cheerleading, rifle, and wrestling. The middle school sports for the spring are baseball, track and field, and softball. The high school sports for the spring are baseball, lacrosse, track and field, tennis, volleyball, and softball.
