= Governor Mifflin Senior High School =

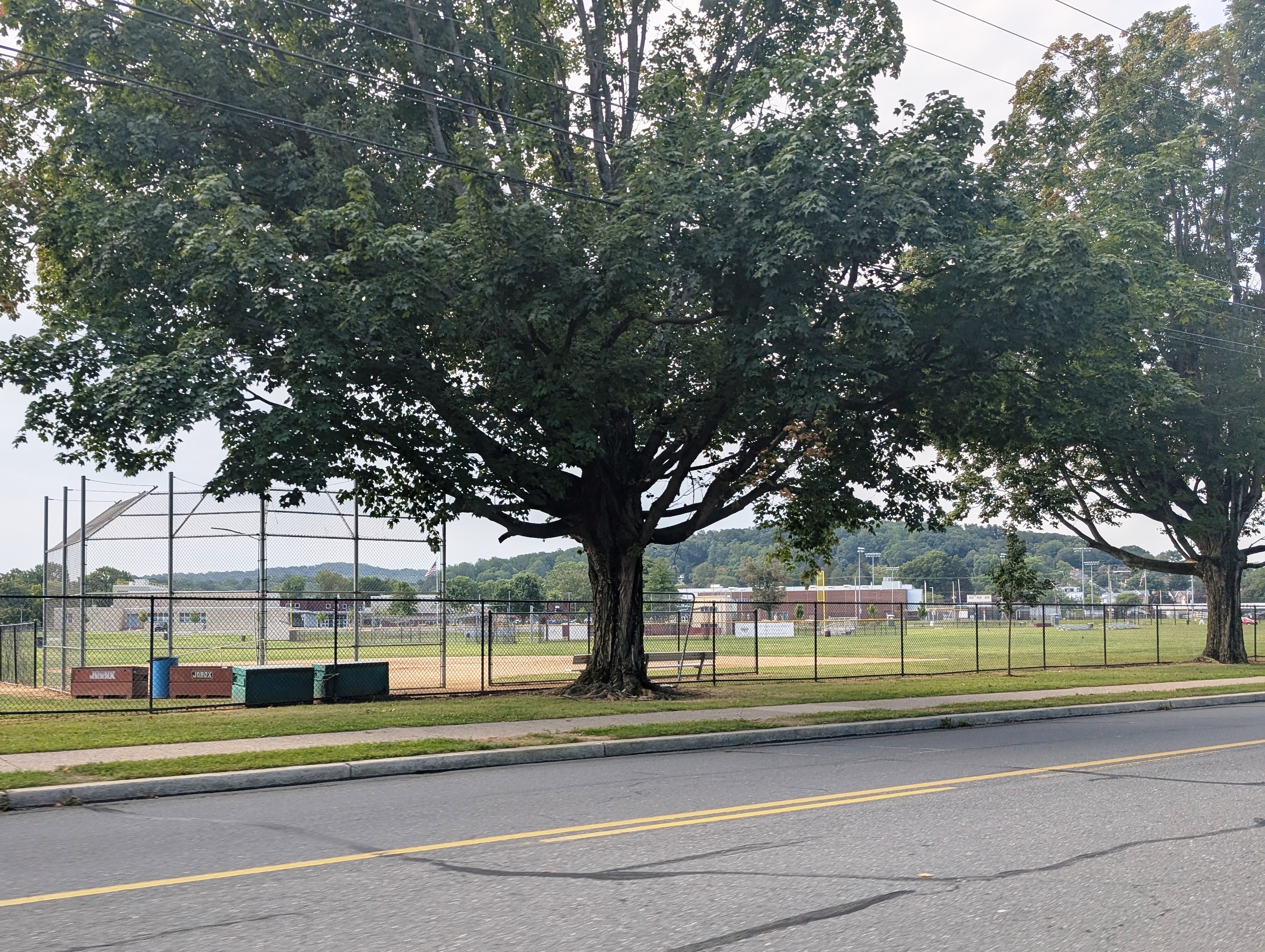
- Campus as seen from U.S. Route 222 Business

Location
- 101 South Waverly Street; Shillington, Berks County, Pennsylvania 19607; United States
- Coordinates: 40.3038°N 75.9597°W

Information
- School type: Secondary
- School district: Governor Mifflin School District
- Superintendent: Lisa Hess
- Principal: Steve Murray
- Staff: 84.50 (on an FTE basis)
- Grades: 9th - 12th
- Enrollment: 1,469 (2023–2024)
- Student to teacher ratio: 17.38
- Colors: Maroon and gold
- Mascot: Mustang
- Rival: Wilson High School
- Feeder schools: Governor Mifflin Middle School
- Information: 610-796-7471
- Website: hs.gmsd.org

Governor Mifflin Senior High School is the only high school in the Governor Mifflin School District. Named for the Revolutionary War major and first governor of Pennsylvania, Thomas Mifflin, it is located in Shillington, Berks County, Pennsylvania and serves students in the five communities of Shillington, Kenhorst, Mohnton, Cumru, and Brecknock.

Governor Mifflin's mascot and logo is "Marvin the Mustang." The school competes at the AAAAA and AAAAAA level in the PIAA categories. As of the 2020-2021 school year, Governor Mifflin Senior High School had a student population of 1,482 and 83.7 teachers of a full-time basis for a student-teacher ratio of 17.71.

== History ==
Governor Mifflin Senior High School replaced Shillington High School in 1953. At that time, the Shillington High School building became the Governor Mifflin Junior High School.

As Shillington High School, it was notably attended by famed American author John Updike, as well as in the graduating class of 2022, Gatorade Football Player Of The Year Nicholas Singleton.

== School analytics ==
Governor Mifflin Senior High School has a total enrollment of 1303 students. The school has a student teacher ratio of 15:1 and a graduation rate of 90%. Its student population is 48% percent female and 52% male.

== Notable alumni ==
- Al Gursky, NFL player
- Nicholas Singleton, college football player
- John Updike, author, Rabbit, Run

== Athletics ==
=== Fall ===
- Cheerleading
- Cross Country
- Field Hockey
- Football
- Golf
- Marching Band
- Soccer
- Tennis
- Volleyball
- Water Polo

=== Winter ===
- Basketball
- Bowling
- Cheerleading
- Rifle
- Swimming
- Wrestling

=== Spring ===
- Baseball
- Softball
- Lacrosse
- Softball
- Tennis
- Track and Field
- Volleyball
