= Rhode Island Indians =

- Founded: 1965
- Folded: 1965
- League: Continental Football League
- Based in: Providence, Rhode Island
- Arena: City Stadium
- Championships: 0

The Rhode Island Indians were a professional American football team based in Providence, Rhode Island. The team was formed in 1965 as a charter member of the Continental Football League. The team (sometimes referred to as the Providence Indians) completed their lone COFL season with a 3–11 record. Prior to their final home game the Indians announced they were withdrawing from the league. Lack of public support was cited as the main factor behind the team's failure; despite this, the Atlantic Coast Football League would make one more attempt at pro football in the city with the Rhode Island Steelers in 1966, which met a similarly ignominious fate.

== Season-by-season ==
	Year	League	W	L	T	Finish	Coach
Rhode Island Indians	1965	Continental Football League	3	11	0	4th, Western Division	Harry Connolly
