= Wilmington Renegades =

Defunct American football team

- Founded: 1966
- Folded: 1967
- League: Atlantic Coast Football League
- Based in: Wilmington, Delaware
- Arena: Baynard Stadium
- Championships: 0

The Wilmington Renegades were a minor league American football team based in Wilmington, Delaware. They joined the Atlantic Coast Football League (ACFL) as the Wilmington Clippers on February 20, 1966. Most of the team's ownership and management carried over from another Wilmington football franchise, the Wilmington Comets of the North American Football League. The team's first signing was Dick Christy, former running back with the Pittsburgh Steelers, Boston Patriots, and New York Jets.

Despite losing $80,000 in 1966, the Clippers returned to the ACFL for the 1967 season. The team announced a five-year working agreement with the NFL's Philadelphia Eagles in March 1967, which saw the Eagles help with the cost of running the team. Despite the agreement, the Clippers continued to lose money and announced their dissolution in September 1967, just two games into the regular season.

The league stepped in immediately and offered to finance the franchise, which was renamed as the Renegades. Newspapers reported the team's full name alternately as the Wilmington Renegades or Delmarva Renegades. The franchise ceased operations permanently in November 1967, canceling their final two regular season games.

== Season-by-season ==
	Year	League	W	L	T	Finish	Coach
Wilmington Clippers	1966	Atlantic Coast Football League	4	7	0	4th, Southern Division	Tex Warrington/Ron Waller
Wilmington Clippers/Renegades	1967	Atlantic Coast Football League	2	7	0	2nd, Southern Division	Ron Waller
