= List of American Football League players =

This is a list of players who appeared in at least one regular season or postseason game in the American Football League (AFL).

== A ==
- Bud Abell
- Ray Abruzzese
- Ken Adamson
- Tom Addison
- Ben Agajanian
- Harold Akin
- Ted Alflen
- Bruce Alford Jr.
- Don Allard
- Buddy Allen
- Chuck Allen
- Dalva Allen
- Don Allen
- George Allen
- Jackie Allen
- Jim Allison
- Buddy Alliston
- Lance Alworth
- Dave Ames
- Billy Anderson
- Dick Anderson
- Max Anderson
- Ralph Anderson
- Lou Andrus
- Houston Antwine
- Jim Apple
- Scott Appleton
- Fred Arbanas
- Dan Archer
- Ray Armstrong
- Doug Asad
- Jack Atchason
- Bill Atkins
- Pervis Atkins
- Al Atkinson
- Frank Atkinson
- George Atkinson
- Joe Auer
- Hank Autry
- Ken Avery
- Joe Avezzano

== B ==
- Gene Babb
- Martin Baccaglio
- Jay Bachman
- Teddy Bailey
- Bill Baird
- Art Baker
- Johnny Baker
- Larry Baker
- Ralph Baker
- Pete Banaszak
- Tony Banfield
- Estes Banks
- Al Bansavage
- Joe Barbee
- Rudy Barber
- Stew Barber
- Charley Barnes
- Ernie Barnes
- Larry Barnes
- Pete Barnes
- Walt Barnes
- Bob Barrett
- Jan Barrett
- Al Barry
- Odell Barry
- Jim Barton
- Glenn Bass
- Norm Bass
- Ted Bates
- Mike Battle
- Walter Beach
- Byron Beams
- Pete Beathard
- Al Beauchamp
- Joe Beauchamp
- Tom Beer
- Dave Behrman
- Tom Beier
- Jim Beirne
- Bobby Bell
- Eddie Bell
- Henry Bell
- Joe Bellino
- George Belotti
- Caesar Belser
- Al Bemiller
- Phil Bennett
- Duane Benson
- Ron Berger
- Bill Bergey
- Frank Bernardi
- Ed Bernet
- Lee Bernet
- Royce Berry
- Elvin Bethea
- Bobby Bethune
- Randy Beverly
- Verlon Biggs
- Fred Biletnikoff
- Ron Billingsley
- Dennis Biodrowski
- Rodger Bird
- Dan Birdwell
- Joe Biscaha
- Sonny Bishop
- Charlie Bivins
- George Blair
- George Blanda
- Sid Blanks
- Phil Blazer
- Hubert Bobo
- Dewey Bohling
- Johnny Bookman
- Emerson Boozer
- Nate Borden
- Ron Botchan
- Jim Boudreaux
- Tommy Boutwell
- Max Boydston
- Garland Boyette
- George Boynton
- John Boynton
- Danny Brabham
- Philip Brady
- John Bramlett
- Mel Branch
- Solomon Brannan
- Alex Bravo
- Hezekiah Braxton
- Don Breaux
- Bob Breitenstein
- Jim Brewington
- Bobby Brezina
- Bob Briggs
- Marlin Briscoe
- Jon Brittenum
- Bob Brodhead
- J.W. Brodnax
- Tommy Brooker
- Bob Brooks
- Fred Broussard
- Aaron Brown
- Barry Brown
- Bill Brown
- Charles Brown
- Charlie Brown
- Don Brown
- Doug Brown
- Fred Brown
- Hardy Brown
- Willie Brown
- Charlie Browning
- Claude Brownlee
- Dick Brubaker
- Charlie Brueckman
- Bob Bruggers
- Sam Brunelli
- Fred Bruney
- Bob Bryant
- Buck Buchanan
- Tim Buchanan
- Tom Buckman
- Ed Budde
- Bill Budness
- Tom Budrewicz
- George Buehler
- Gary Bugenhagen
- Drew Buie
- Fred Bukaty
- Frank Buncom
- Nick Buoniconti
- Jerry Burch
- Chris Burford
- Bobby Burnett
- George Burrell
- Ode Burrell
- Leon Burton
- Ron Burton
- Gerry Bussell
- Bob Butler
- Bernard Buzyniski
- Butch Byrd
- Dennis Byrd

== C ==
- John Cadwell
- John Cagle
- Dan Callahan
- Jim Campbell
- Ken Campbell
- Stan Campbell
- Woody Campbell
- Justin Canale
- Whit Canale
- Joe Cannavino
- Billy Cannon
- Bob Cappadona
- Gino Cappelletti
- Wray Carlton
- Al Carmichael
- Paul Carmichael
- Reggie Carolan
- Don Carothers
- Ken Carpenter
- Preston Carpenter
- Ron Carpenter
- Levert Carr
- John Carrell
- Ed Carrington
- Jim Carroll
- Johnny Carson
- Kern Carson
- Larry Carwell
- Rick Casares
- Tim Casey
- John Cash
- Tom Cassese
- Carmen Cavalli
- Ronnie Caveness
- Grady Cavness
- Dan Chamberlain
- Edgar Chandler
- John Charles
- Carl Charon
- B.W. Cheeks
- Donald Chelf
- George Chesser
- Jim Cheyunski
- Ed Chlebek
- Max Choboian
- Steve Chomyszak
- Dick Chorovich
- Dick Christy
- Earl Christy
- Donnis Churchwell
- Tom Cichowski
- Jack Clancy
- Howard Clark
- Hagood Clarke
- Bobby Clatterbuck
- Doug Cline
- Dave Cloutier
- Bert Coan
- Gene Cockrell
- Donald Coffey
- Abe Cohen
- Jim Colclough
- Fred Cole
- Al Coleman
- Jerald Collins
- Ray Collins
- Dick Compton
- Dan Conners
- Greg Cook
- Ed Cooke
- Bob Coolbaugh
- Thurlow Cooper
- King Corcoran
- Ollie Cordill
- Walt Corey
- Jerry Cornelison
- Bruce Coslet
- Dave Costa
- Paul Costa
- Jim Cox
- Larry Cox
- Eric Crabtree
- Dobie Craig
- Gary Crane
- Paul Crane
- Hilton Crawford
- Jim Crawford
- Ken Criter
- Bobby Crockett
- Monte Crockett
- Bill Cronin
- Bobby Cross
- Jim Crotty
- Jake Crouthamel
- Al Crow
- Wayne Crow
- Harry Crump
- Doug Crusan
- Larry Csonka
- Walt Cudzik
- Curley Culp
- Ed Culpepper
- Ed Cummings
- Carl Cunningham
- Dick Cunningham
- Jay Cunningham
- Mike Current
- Gary Cutsinger

== D ==
- Frank D'Agostino
- Mike D'Amato
- Bill Danenhauer
- Eldon Danenhauer
- George Daney
- Clem Daniels
- Dave Daniels
- Bill Darnall
- Dan Darragh
- Ben Davidson
- Cotton Davidson
- Pete Davidson
- Bob Davis
- Dick Davis
- Jack Davis (born 1932)
- Jack Davis (born 1933)
- Marvin Davis
- Bill Dawson
- Len Dawson
- Al Day
- Tom Day
- Bob Dee
- Nick DeFelice
- Dick Degen
- Steve DeLong
- Sam DeLuca
- Jerry DeLucca
- Guy Dennis
- Al Denson
- John Denvir
- Donald R. Deskins, Jr.
- Wayne DeSutter
- Chuck DeVleigher
- Willard Dewveall
- Bill Diamond
- Charley Diamond
- Eldridge Dickey
- Wallace Dickey
- Bo Dickinson
- John Diehl
- Tony DiMidio
- Tom Dimitroff, Sr.
- Tom Dimmick
- Tony Discenzo
- John Dittrich
- Joe DiVito
- Hewritt Dixon
- Ollie Dobbins
- John Dockery
- Leon Dombrowski
- Marty Domres
- Tom Domres
- Gene Donaldson
- Roger Donnahoo
- Ben Donnell
- Al Dorow
- Dick Dorsey
- Al Dotson
- Bob Dougherty
- John Douglas
- Dick Doyle
- Elbert Drungo
- Elbert Dubenion
- Tom Dublinski
- Mitch Dudek
- Mike Dukes
- Jim Dunaway
- Randy Duncan
- Rick Duncan
- Speedy Duncan
- Charlie Dupre
- Pete Duranko
- Ken Dyer

== E ==
- John Eason
- Rick Eber
- Booker Edgerson
- Randy Edmunds
- Lloyd Edwards
- Jim Eifrid
- Mike Eischeid
- Larry Eisenhauer
- Larry Elkins
- John Elliott
- Roger Ellis
- Paul Elzey
- Frank Emanuel
- John Embree
- Hunter Enis
- Bill Enyart
- Pat Epperson
- Bernie Erickson
- Tom Erlandson
- Terry Erwin
- Don Estes
- Bob Evans
- Dale Evans
- Jim Evans
- Norm Evans

== F ==
- Bill Fairband
- Earl Faison
- Stan Fanning
- Dick Farley
- Lonnie Farmer
- Miller Farr
- Curt Farrier
- John Farris
- Staley Faulkner
- Paul Feldhausen
- Dick Felt
- Ralph Felton
- Lane Fenner
- Charley Ferguson
- Gene Ferguson
- Howie Ferguson
- Manny Fernandez
- Orlando Ferrante
- Howard Fest
- Jim Fetherston
- Dan Ficca
- George Fields
- Jerry Fields
- Gary Finneran
- Roger Finnie
- George Fleming
- Billy Fletcher
- George Flint
- Tom Flores
- Charlie Flowers
- Don Floyd
- Don Flynn
- Dave Foley
- Wayne Fontes
- Fred Ford
- Garrett Ford, Sr.
- Fred Forsberg
- Gene Foster
- Sid Fournet
- Bobby Fowler
- Charlie Fowler
- Jerry Fowler
- Willmer Fowler
- Jason Franci
- John Frantz
- Jim Fraser
- Al Frazier
- Charley Frazier
- Curt Frazier
- Wayne Frazier
- Willie Frazier
- Dick Frey
- John Frongillo
- Charley Fuller
- Tom Funchess
- Jim Furey
- Thomas Fussell

== G ==
- George Gaiser
- Bob Gaiters
- Chon Gallegos
- R.C. Gamble
- Bob Garner
- Carl Garrett
- Drake Garrett
- J.D. Garrett
- Mike Garrett
- Gary Garrison
- Larry Garron
- Chuck Gavin
- Jack Gehrke
- Roy Gerela
- Claude Gibson
- Cookie Gilchrist
- Fred Gillett
- Jon Gilliam
- Scotty Glacken
- Bob Gladieux
- Glenn Glass
- Howard Glenn
- Fred Glick
- Gary Glick
- Art Gob
- George Goeddeke
- Pete Gogolak
- Al Goldstein
- Goose Gonsoulin
- John Gonzaga
- Tom Good
- Tom Goode
- Doug Goodwin
- Bobby Gordon
- Cornell Gordon
- Gene Grabosky
- Garry Grady
- Art Graham
- Kenny Graham
- Milt Graham
- Rufus Granderson
- Hoyle Granger
- Larry Grantham
- Willie Grate
- White Graves
- Jim Gray
- Moses Gray
- Dave Grayson
- Gary Greaves
- Charlie Green
- Jerry Green
- Johnny Green
- Ted Greene
- Tom Greene
- Charlie Greer
- Jim Greer
- Ben Gregory
- Ken Gregory
- Bob Griese
- Jim Griffin
- John Griffin
- Bill Groman
- George Gross
- Lee Grosscup
- Sam Gruneisen
- Pat Gucciardo
- Dick Guesman
- Paul Guidry
- John Guillory
- Don Gulseth
- Harry Gunner
- Buzz Guy
- Louis Guy
- John Guzik

== H ==
- John Hadl
- Mike Haffner
- Roger Hagberg
- Mac Haik
- Galen Hall
- Kenneth Hall
- Ron Hall
- Kim Hammond
- Charlie Hardy
- Ed Harmon
- Darrell Harper
- Jack Harper
- Dick Harris
- James Harris
- Jim Harris
- Jimmy Harris
- John Harris
- Pete Hart
- Jim Harvey
- Waddey Harvey
- Johnny Hatley
- Art Hauser
- Wayne Hawkins
- Jim Hayes
- Luther Hayes
- Raymond Hayes
- Wendell Hayes
- Abner Haynes
- Sherrill Headrick
- Don Healy
- Gene Heeter
- Don Heinrich
- Bob Heinz
- Jerry Helluin
- Karl Henke
- Carey Henley
- Tom Hennessey
- Charlie Hennigan
- Dan Henning
- Gary Henson
- Bill Herchman
- Joe Hergert
- Dave Herman
- Dick Hermann
- Don Herndon
- Ken Herock
- George Herring
- Mike Hibler
- Bo Hickey
- W. K. Hicks
- Jim Higgins
- Buzz Highsmith
- Dave Hill
- Jack Hill
- Jim Hill
- Jimmy Hill
- Mack Lee Hill
- Winston Hill
- Glen Ray Hines
- Jim Hines
- Dalton Hoffman
- Jon Hohman
- Al Hoisington
- Henry Holligan
- Gus Hollomon
- Johnny Holmes
- Pat Holmes
- Robert Holmes
- E. J. Holub
- Gordy Holz
- Jerry Hopkins
- Roy Hopkins
- Roy Hord, Jr.
- Bob Horton
- Ken Houston
- Bob Howard
- Bobby Howfield
- John Huard
- John Huarte
- Marv Hubbard
- Brad Hubbert
- Floyd Hudlow
- Mike Hudock
- Bill Hudson
- Bob Hudson
- Dick Hudson
- Jim Hudson
- Gene Huey
- Bill Hull
- Buddy Humphrey
- Bob Humphreys
- Bobby Hunt
- Jim Lee Hunt
- Billy Hunter
- Chuck Hurston
- Ed Husmann
- Paul Hynes

== I ==
- Cosmo Iacavazzi
- Ray Ilg
- Jerry Inman

== J ==
- Bobby Jackson
- Charlie Jackson
- Frank Jackson
- Rich Jackson
- Frank Jackunas
- Harry Jacobs
- Proverb Jacobs
- Ray Jacobs
- Jack Jacobson
- Harry Jagielski
- Robert James
- Dick Jamieson
- Al Jamison
- Bobby Jancik
- Chuck Janerette
- Tom Janik
- Pete Jaquess
- Jon Jelacic
- Luther Jeralds
- Bill Jessup
- Gene Jeter
- Billy Joe
- Pete Johns
- Billy Johnson
- Bob Johnson
- Curley Johnson
- Daryl Johnson
- Dick Johnson
- Ellis Johnson
- Essex Johnson
- Jack Johnson
- Jim Johnson
- Joe Johnson
- John Henry Johnson
- Preston Johnson
- Rich Johnson
- Mark Johnston
- Charlie Joiner
- Curtis Jones
- Ezell Jones
- Gene Jones
- Henry Jones
- Jim Jones
- Jimmie Jones
- Jimmy Jones
- Willie Jones (born 1939)
- Willie Jones (born 1942)
- Larry Jordan
- Bob Joswick
- Don Joyce
- L. C. Joyner
- Fred Julian

== K ==
- Karl Kaimer
- Bob Kalsu
- Larry Kaminski
- Emil Karas
- Joe Katchik
- Jim Kearney
- Bill Keating
- Tom Keating
- Val Keckin
- Rex Keeling
- Edward Kelley
- Mike Kellogg
- Bob Kelly
- Jack Kemp
- Charlie Kempinska
- Charlie Kendall
- John Kenerson
- Greg Kent
- Randy Kerbow
- Bob Keyes
- Jimmy Keyes
- Ed Khayat
- Jim Kiick
- Bill Kimber
- Billy Kinard
- Keith Kinderman
- Howard Kindig
- Bill Kindricks
- Charlie King
- Claude King
- Don King
- Henry King
- Tony King
- George Kinney
- Gary Kirner
- Dick Klein
- Jack Klotz
- Roger Kochman
- Dave Kocourek
- John Kompara
- Bob Konovsky
- Ed Koontz
- Ed Kovac
- Walt Kowalczyk
- Joe Krakoski
- Karl Kremser
- Bill Krisher
- Alex Kroll
- Gary Kroner
- Bob Kruse
- Ray Kubala
- Frank Kuchta
- Joe Kulbacki

== L ==
- Ernie Ladd
- Mack Lamb
- Ron Lamb
- Gordon Lambert
- Pat Lamberti
- Pete Lammons
- Daryle Lamonica
- Bobby Lane
- Willie Lanier
- Dan Lanphear
- Bob Laraba
- Jack Laraway
- Dan LaRose
- Carl Larpenter
- Jack Larscheid
- Bill Larson
- Paul Larson
- Bill Laskey
- Ike Lassiter
- Paul Latzke
- Al Lawson
- Jerry Lawson
- Jim LeClair
- Roger LeClerc
- Monte Ledbetter
- Bob Lee
- Jacky Lee
- Max Leetzow
- Jim LeMoine
- Bill Lenkaitis
- Jack Lentz
- Bobby Leo
- Chuck Leo
- Cecil Leonard
- Darrell Lester
- Cotton Letner
- Jerry LeVias
- Hal Lewis (born 1935)
- Hal Lewis (born 1944)
- Sherman Lewis
- Keith Lincoln
- Paul Lindquist
- Hub Lindsey
- Pete Liske
- Floyd Little
- Larry Little
- Dale Livingston
- Mike Livingston
- Walt Livingston
- Billy Ray Locklin
- Oscar Lofton
- Mike London
- Charlie Long
- Mike Long
- Sam Longmire
- Dean Look
- Ed Lothamer
- Billy Lott
- Rommie Loudd
- Tom Louderback
- Angelo Loukas
- Paul Lowe
- Richie Lucas
- Tommy Luke
- Booth Lusteg
- Fran Lynch
- Jim Lynch

== M ==
- Dee Mackey
- Jacque MacKinnon
- Eddie Macon
- John Maczuzak
- Paul Maguire
- Billy Majors
- Joe Majors
- John Mangum
- Pete Mangum
- Don Manoukian
- Bobby Maples
- Ed Marcontell
- Marv Marinovich
- Bob Marques
- Jim Marsalis
- Aaron Marsh
- Frank Wayne Marsh
- Bud Marshall
- Chuck Marshall
- Blanche Martin
- Dave Martin
- Larry Martin
- Billy Masters
- Bill Mathis
- John Matlock
- Pat Matson
- Archie Matsos
- Wes Matthews
- John Mattox
- Marv Matuszak
- Doug Mayberry
- Ben Mayes
- Don Maynard
- Jerry Mays
- Bob McAdams
- Carl McAdams
- Mike McBath
- Norm McBride
- Dick McCabe
- Ed McCall
- Ron McCall
- Jim McCanless
- Brendan McCarthy
- Mickey McCarty
- Curtis McClinton
- Kent McCloughan
- Wayne McClure
- Don McComb
- John McCormick
- Lloyd McCoy
- Dale McCullers
- Bob McCullough
- Jim McCusker
- Wahoo McDaniel
- Gary McDermott
- Ron McDole
- Don McDonald
- Gerry McDougall
- Bud McFadin
- Nyle McFarlane
- George McGee
- John McGeever
- Dan McGrew
- Don McKinnon
- Bob McLeod
- Art McMahon
- Jim McMillin
- John McMullan
- Chuck McMurtry
- Bob McNamara
- Charlie McNeil
- Warren McVea
- Ed Meixler
- Mario Mendez
- Mike Mercer
- Dudley Meredith
- Jim Mertens
- Curt Merz
- Eddie Meyer
- John Meyer
- Rich Michael
- Walt Michaels
- Dave Middendorf
- Pete Mikolajewski
- John Milks
- Alan Miller
- Bill Miller (born 1936)
- Bill Miller (born 1940)
- Paul Miller
- Pete Mills
- Charlie Milstead
- Gene Milton
- Gene Mingo
- Tom Minter
- Rex Mirich
- Bob Mischak
- Charley Mitchell
- Ed Mitchell
- Leroy Mitchell
- Stan Mitchell
- Tom Mitchell
- Willie Mitchell
- Robert Mitinger
- Ron Mix
- Mel Montalbo
- Mike Montler
- Alex Moore
- Fred Moore
- Leroy Moore
- Zeke Moore
- Mo Moorman
- Doug Moreau
- Fran Morelli
- Dennit Morris
- Jon Morris
- Mercury Morris
- Riley Morris
- Dave Morrison
- Ron Morrison
- Tommy Morrow
- Haven Moses
- Rich Mostardi
- Bobby Moten
- Chuck Muelhaupt
- Horst Muhlmann
- Nick Mumley
- Lloyd Mumphord
- Jesse Murdock
- Bill Murphy
- Chip Myers
- Chip Myrtle

== N ==
- Joe Namath
- Jim Nance
- Walter Napier
- Bob Neff
- John Neidert
- Billy Neighbors
- Benny Nelson
- Ron Nery
- Tom Neumann
- Tom Neville
- Steve Newell
- Bobby Nichols
- Mike Nichols
- Pete Nicklas
- Doyle Nix
- John Nocera
- George Nock
- Tom Nomina
- Karl Noonan
- Jim Norris
- Trusse Norris
- Don Norton
- Jim Norton
- Rick Norton
- Joe Novsek
- Phil Nugent
- Julian Nunamaker
- R.B. Nunnery

== O ==
- Don Oakes
- Carleton Oats
- Tom Oberg
- Tommy O'Connell
- Sammy Joe Odom
- Joe O'Donnell
- Dave Ogas
- Paul Oglesby
- Ross O'Hanley
- Chip Oliver
- Harold Olson
- Johnny Olszewski
- Jim O'Mahoney
- Steve O'Neal
- Bob O'Neil
- Larry Onesti
- Clancy Osborne
- Gus Otto
- Jim Otto
- John Outlaw
- Terry Owens

== P ==
- Joe Pagliei
- Sam Palumbo
- Nick Papac
- Babe Parilli
- Ernie Park
- Charlie Parker
- Willie Parker
- Bernie Parrish
- Dennis Partee
- Bill Pashe
- Alan Pastrana
- Herb Paterra
- Wayne Patrick
- Dainard Paulson
- Johnny Peacock
- Willie Pearson
- Tom Pennington
- Bill Perkins
- Jim Perkins
- Willis Perkins
- Phil Perlo
- Pete Perreault
- Anton Peters
- Frank Peters
- Volney Peters
- Bill Peterson
- Bob Petrella
- Bob Petrich
- Leroy Phelps
- Gerry Philbin
- Jess Phillips
- Ed Philpott
- Frank Pitts
- Hugh Pitts
- John Pitts
- Dave Pivec
- Dave Plump
- Sherman Plunkett
- Bobby Ply
- Ed Podolak
- Bob Poole
- Willie Porter
- Dickie Post
- Art Powell
- Charley Powell
- Jesse Powell
- Warren Powers
- Gene Prebola
- Jim Price
- Sammy Price
- Billy Pricer
- Bob Print
- Errol Prisby
- Ron Pritchard
- Remi Prudhomme
- Barry Pryor
- Vic Purvis
- Jack Pyburn
- Johnny Pyeatt
- Palmer Pyle
- George Pyne III

== Q ==
- Frank Quayle
- Jeff Queen
- Steve Quinn

== R ==
- Warren Rabb
- Bill Rademacher
- Dennis Randall
- Randy Rasmussen
- Ray Ratkowski
- Bert Rechichar
- Rick Redman
- Alvin Reed
- Leo Reed
- Roy Reeves
- Tom Regner
- Bob Reifsnyder
- Dennis Remmert
- Bob Renn
- Larry Rentz
- Al Reynolds
- Billy Reynolds
- M.C. Reynolds
- Andy Rice
- George Rice
- Ken Rice
- Jim Richards
- Perry Richards
- Al Richardson
- Bob Richardson
- Gloster Richardson
- Jeff Richardson
- Jess Richardson
- John Richardson
- Mike Richardson
- Pete Richardson
- Tom Richardson
- Mike Richey
- Frank Richter
- Houston Ridge
- Preston Ridlehuber
- Charlie Rieves
- Jim Riley
- Ken Riley
- Lee Riley
- Ray Rissmiller
- Hank Rivera
- Bo Roberson
- Archie Roberts
- Cliff Roberts
- Bob Robertson
- Bill Robinson
- Jerry Robinson
- Johnny Robinson
- Paul Robinson
- Frank Robotti
- Paul Rochester
- John Roderick
- Herb Roedel
- Bill Roehnelt
- Don Rogers
- Dave Rolle
- Tony Romeo
- Al Romine
- Hatch Rosdahl
- Dave Ross
- Willie Ross
- Tobin Rote
- Justin Rowland
- Bob Rowley
- Karl Rubke
- Jack Rudolph
- Marion Rushing
- Benny Russell
- Charlie Rutkowski
- Ed Rutkowski
- Joe Ryan
- Tom Rychlec

== S ==
- Ron Sabal
- Saint Saffold
- Tom Saidock
- George Saimes
- Johnny Sample
- Rick Sapienza
- Tony Sardisco
- Dan Sartin
- Doug Satcher
- George Sauer, Jr.
- Jimmy Saxton
- Ron Sayers
- Ronald Sbranti
- Bob Scarpitto
- Joe Schaffer
- Maury Schleicher
- Ray Schmautz
- Jim Schmedding
- Bob Schmidt
- Henry Schmidt
- John Schmitt
- Mike Schnitker
- Marty Schottenheimer
- Harry Schuh
- Gerhard Schwedes
- Bob Schweickert
- Bill Scott
- Clarence Scott
- Jack Scott
- Lew Scott
- Bob Scrabis
- Ed Scrutchins
- Jimmy Sears
- Robert Sedlock
- Paul Seiler
- Larry Seiple
- Gene Selawski
- Goldie Sellers
- Ron Sellers
- Tom Sestak
- Don Shackelford
- Billy Shaw
- George Shaw
- Glenn Shaw
- Pat Shea
- Art Shell
- Rod Sherman
- Tom Sherman
- George Shirkey
- Bill Shockley
- Chuck Shonta
- John Simerson
- Arnie Simkus
- Leon Simmons
- Jackie Simpson
- O. J. Simpson
- Willie Simpson
- Karl Singer
- John Sklopan
- Mickey Slaughter
- Richard Sligh
- Tom Smiley
- Allen Smith (born October 7, 1942)
- Allen Smith (born November 20, 1942)
- Bob Smith
- Bobby Smith
- Carl Smith
- Charlie Smith
- Dan Smith
- Dave Smith
- Don Smith
- Fletcher Smith
- Hal Smith
- J. D. Smith
- Jimmy Smith
- Noland Smith
- Paul Smith
- Russ Smith
- Tommie Smith
- Willie Smith
- Mark Smolinski
- Matt Snell
- Matt Snorton
- Al Snyder
- Bob Soltis
- Mike Sommer
- Butch Songin
- Jim Sorey
- Henry Sorrell
- Dick Speights
- Julian Spence
- Ollie Spencer
- Jack Spikes
- Philip Spiller
- Len St. Jean
- Jeff Staggs
- Jerry Stalcup
- Bill Staley
- Bill Stanfill
- Marshall Starks
- Bob Stein
- Jan Stenerud
- Harold Stephens
- Thomas Stephens
- Kay Stephenson
- Wayne Stewart
- James Stinnette
- Carel Stith
- John Stofa
- Jesse Stokes
- Donnie Stone
- Jack Stone
- Rich Stotter
- Smokey Stover
- Art Strahan
- Bob Stransky
- Mike Stratton
- Tony Stricker
- Dave Strickland
- Bill Striegel
- Michael Stromberg
- Morris Stroud
- George Strugar
- Jerry Sturm
- Bob Suci
- Walter Suggs
- Jim Summers
- Mickey Sutton
- Bob Svihus
- Terry Swanson
- Richard Swatland
- Neal Sweeney
- Walt Sweeney
- Jim Swink
- Eugene Sykes

== T ==
- Bob Talamini
- Mike Taliaferro
- George Tarasovic
- Jerry Tarr
- Carl Taseff
- Bob Tatarek
- Lionel Taylor
- Otis Taylor
- Sammie Taylor
- Steve Tensi
- Tony Teresa
- Marvin Terrell
- Corky Tharp
- Jim Thibert
- Emmitt Thomas
- Gene Thomas
- Jesse Thomas
- Speedy Thomas
- Bill Thompson
- Jim Thompson
- Steve Thompson
- Art Thoms
- Bubba Thornton
- Jack Thornton
- Jim Tiller
- Dave Tobey
- Bill Tobin
- Larry Todd
- Charlie Tolar
- Jim Tolbert
- Ed Toner
- LaVerne Torczon
- Bobby Towns
- John Tracey
- Allen Trammel
- Richard Trapp
- Orville Trask
- Herb Travenio
- John Travis
- Jerry Traynham
- Frank Tripucka
- Gene Trosch
- Dalton Truax
- Don Trull
- Bob Trumpy
- Gary Tucker
- Phil Tuckett
- Bake Turner
- Clem Turner
- Jim Turner
- Vince Turner
- Howard Twilley
- Jim Tyrer
- Dick Tyson

== U ==
- Olen Underwood
- Gene Upshaw
- Jim Urbanek
- Herm Urenda

== V ==
- Vern Valdez
- Billy Van Heusen
- Dick Van Raaphorst
- Bob Vaughn
- Theophile Viltz
- Bob Voight

== W ==
- Jim Wagstaff
- Loyd Wainscott
- Clarence Walker
- Wayne Walker
- Henry Wallace
- Ron Waller
- Fred Wallner
- Ed Wals
- Sam Walton
- Hal Wantland
- Ernie Warlick
- Charley Warner
- Dewey Warren
- Jimmy Warren
- Ron Warzeka
- Clyde Washington
- Dave Washington
- Dick Washington
- Russ Washington
- Teddy Washington
- Jim Waskiewicz
- Dave Watson
- Ed Watson
- Bob Watters
- Don Webb
- Dave Webster
- George Webster
- Bucky Wegener
- Ted Wegert
- Sammy Weir
- Ed Weisacosky
- Billy Wells
- Bob Wells
- Warren Wells
- Bob Werl
- Dave West
- Mel West
- Willie West
- Dick Westmoreland
- Max Wettstein
- Jim Whalen
- Hogan Wharton
- Manch Wheeler
- Andre White
- Bob White
- Harvey White
- John White
- Lee White
- Bud Whitehead
- Hall Whitley
- Nat Whitmyer
- Bert Wilder
- Howie Williams
- Maxie Williams
- Monk Williams
- Wandy Williams
- Willie Williams
- Fred Williamson
- J. R. Williamson
- Eddie Wilson
- George Wilson
- Jerrel Wilson
- Mike Wilson
- Nemiah Wilson
- Gary Wisener
- Al Witcher
- Mel Witt
- John Wittenborn
- Wayne Wolff
- Royce Womble
- Bill Wood
- Dick Wood
- Duane Wood
- Al Woodall
- Glenn Woods
- Freddie Woodson
- Junior Wren
- Ernie Wright
- Gordon Wright
- Jim Wright
- Lonnie Wright
- Sam Wyche

== Y ==
- John Yaccino
- Bob Yates
- Bill Yearby
- James Yeats
- Bill Yelverton
- Tom Yewcic
- Dave Yohn
- Mack Yoho
- Bob Young
- Joe Young
- Sid Youngelman
- Frank Youso

== Z ==
- Paul Zaeske
- Carroll Zaruba
- Rich Zecher
- Bob Zeman
