= 1966 American Football League draft =

American Football League draft

1966 AFL draft

General information
- Date: November 27, 1965

Overview
- 180 (regular draft) + 99 (Red Shirt draft) total selections in 20 (regular draft) + 11 (Red Shirt draft) rounds
- League: AFL
- First selection: Jim Grabowski, RB; Miami Dolphins
- Mr. Irrelevant: Ken McLean, E Buffalo Bills
- Most selections (24): New York Jets
- Fewest selections (18): Boston Patriots; Oakland Raiders
- Hall of Famers: 2 (1 of Red Shirt draft)

The 1966 American Football League draft was held on Saturday, November 27, 1965. The AFL added the Miami Dolphins as an expansion team in 1966 to bring its total to nine franchises for its seventh season. The Dolphins were awarded the first overall pick in the draft, who used it to select running back Jim Grabowski. The only Hall of Famer to come out of this draft was kicker Jan Stenerud, who was picked by the Kansas City Chiefs in the third round of the Red Shirt portion of the draft.

This was the last competitive draft of the American Football League before the AFL–NFL merger agreement, which was announced in June 1966. The next draft of college players in 1967 was a common draft, held in mid-March.

The 1966 NFL draft was held the same day, November 27, 1965.

== Player selections (AFL) ==
= Pro Bowler	= AFL All-Star	= Hall of Famer

=== Round 1 ===
Pick #	AFL Team	Player	Position	College
1	Miami Dolphins	Jim Grabowski	Running back	Illinois
2	Miami Dolphins	Rick Norton	Quarterback	Kentucky
3	Boston Patriots	Karl Singer	Tackle	Purdue
4	Denver Broncos	Jerry Shay	Defensive tackle	Purdue
5	Houston Oilers ^{(Pick acquired from New York)}	Tommy Nobis	Linebacker	Texas
6	Kansas City Chiefs	Aaron Brown	Defensive end	Minnesota
7	San Diego Chargers	Don Davis	Defensive tackle	Cal State Los Angeles
8	Buffalo Bills	Mike Dennis	Running back	Mississippi
13	New York Jets	William Yearby	Defensive end	Michigan
63	Oakland Raiders	Rodger Bird	Defensive back	Kentucky

*As an expansion team, Miami picked first in every round and was awarded an extra pick at the beginning of the draft.
*New York deferred its first round selection, taking the 13th pick instead of the 9th.
*Oakland deferred its selections until after the first six rounds and traded its sixth round pick. Its first round pick was made after the 7th round, 63rd overall. They made their second, third, and fifth round picks in the middle of the 7th round, so the first round pick was actually the fourth pick Oakland made.

=== Round 2 ===
Pick #	AFL Team	Player	Position	College
9	Miami Dolphins	Frank Emanuel	Linebacker	Tennessee
10	Boston Patriots	Jim Boudreaux	Tackle	Louisiana Tech
11	Denver Broncos	Freeman White	Tight end	Nebraska
12	Houston Oilers	Stan Hindman	Defensive end	Mississippi
14	New York Jets	Sam Ball	Tackle	Kentucky
15	Kansas City Chiefs	Francis Peay	Tackle	Missouri
16	San Diego Chargers	Nick Rassas	Defensive back	Notre Dame
17	Buffalo Bills	Jim Lindsey	Running back	Arkansas
57	Oakland Raiders	Butch Allison	Tackle	Missouri

*Oakland deferred its selections until after the first six rounds and traded its sixth round pick. Its second round pick was made during the 7th round, 57th overall. This was the first pick Oakland made in the draft.

=== Round 3 ===
Pick #	AFL Team	Player	Position	College
18	Miami Dolphins	Larry Gagner	Guard	Florida
19	Boston Patriots	Harold Lucas	Tackle	Michigan State
20	Denver Broncos	Bob Hadrick	End	Purdue
21	Houston Oilers	George Rice	Defensive tackle	Louisiana State
22	New York Jets	Carl McAdams	Defensive tackle	Oklahoma
23	Kansas City Chiefs	Walt Barnes	Defensive tackle	Nebraska
24	San Diego Chargers	Milt Morin	Tight end	Massachusetts
25	Buffalo Bills	Randy Jackson	Tackle	Florida
58	Oakland Raiders	Tom Mitchell	Tight end	Bucknell

*Oakland deferred its selections until after the first six rounds and traded its sixth round pick. Its third round pick was made during the 7th round, 58th overall. This was the second pick Oakland made in the draft.

=== Round 4 ===
Pick #	AFL Team	Player	Position	College
26	Miami Dolphins	Dick Leftridge	Fullback	West Virginia
27	Denver Broncos ^{(Pick acquired from Boston)}	Randy Johnson	Quarterback	Texas A&M-Kingsville
28	Houston Oilers ^{(Pick acquired from Denver)}	George Allen	Tackle	West Texas A&M
29	New York Jets ^{(Pick acquired from Houston)}	Jim Waskiewicz	Center	Wichita State
30	New York Jets	Phil Sheridan	End	Notre Dame
31	Kansas City Chiefs	Elijah Gibson	Halfback	Bethune–Cookman
32	San Diego Chargers	Charlie Brown	Defensive back	Syracuse
33	Buffalo Bills	Bobby Burnett	Running back	Arkansas
71	Oakland Raiders	Dick Tyson	Guard	Tulsa

*Oakland deferred its selections until after the first six rounds and traded its sixth round pick. Its fourth round pick was made during the 8th round, 71st overall. This was the fifth pick Oakland made in the draft.

=== Round 5 ===
Pick #	AFL Team	Player	Position	College
34	Miami Dolphins	Grady Bolton	Tackle	Mississippi State
35	Boston Patriots	John Mangum	Defensive tackle	Southern Mississippi
36	Denver Broncos	Billy Clay	Defensive back	Mississippi
37	Houston Oilers	Hoyle Granger	Running back	Mississippi State
38	New York Jets	Ben Hawkins	Wide receiver	Arizona State
39	Kansas City Chiefs	Doug Van Horn	Guard	Ohio State
40	San Diego Chargers	Russ Smith	Running back	Miami
41	Buffalo Bills	Bob Sherlag	Wide receiver	Memphis
59	Oakland Raiders	Pete Banaszak	Running back	Miami

*Oakland deferred its selections until after the first six rounds and traded its sixth round pick. Its fifth round pick was made during the 7th round, 59th overall. This was the third pick Oakland made in the draft.

=== Round 6 ===
Pick #	AFL Team	Player	Position	College
42	Miami Dolphins	Ed Weisacosky	Linebacker	Miami
43	Boston Patriots	Dan Irby	Tackle	Louisiana Tech
44	Denver Broncos	James Fulgham	Tackle	Minnesota
45	Houston Oilers	Dave Long	Defensive end	Iowa
46	New York Jets	Emerson Boozer	Running back	Maryland Eastern Shore
47	Kansas City Chiefs	John Osmond	Center	Tulsa
48	New York Jets ^{(Pick acquired from Oakland)}	Dick LeMay	Guard	Vanderbilt
49	San Diego Chargers	Gary Pettigrew	Defensive tackle	Stanford
50	Buffalo Bills	Bill Johnson	Halfback	University of the South

*Oakland deferred its selections until after the first six rounds and traded its sixth round pick.

=== Round 7 ===
Pick #	AFL Team	Player	Position	College
51	Miami Dolphins	Don Hansen	Linebacker	Illinois
52	Boston Patriots	Jim Battle	Tackle	Saginaw Valley State
53	Denver Broncos	Jerry Jones	Tackle	Bowling Green
54	Houston Oilers	Pep Menefee	Wide receiver	New Mexico State
55	New York Jets	Joe Dobson	Tackle	Idaho
56	Kansas City Chiefs	Charlie Gogolak	Kicker	Princeton
60	Oakland Raiders	Frank McRae	Defensive tackle	Tennessee State
61	San Diego Chargers	Jim Tolbert	Defensive back	Lincoln (MO)
62	Denver Broncos ^{(Pick acquired from Buffalo)}	Scotty Glacken	Quarterback	Duke

*Oakland deferred its selections until after the first six rounds. Picks 57, 58, & 59 were deferred Oakland picks and are shown in rounds two, three, and five respectively.

=== Round 8 ===
Pick #	AFL Team	Player	Position	College
64	Miami Dolphins	Bob Petrella	Defensive back	Tennessee
65	Boston Patriots	Sam Montgomery	Defensive back	Southern University
66	Denver Broncos	Goldie Sellers	Defensive back	Grambling State
67	Houston Oilers	Dan Bland	Halfback	Mississippi State
68	New York Jets	Pete Lammons	Tight end	Texas
69	Kansas City Chiefs	Fletcher Smith	Defensive back	Tennessee State
72	San Diego Chargers	Doug Buffone	Linebacker	Louisville
73	Buffalo Bills	Paul Guidry	Linebacker	McNeese State

*Oakland deferred its selections until after the first six rounds. Pick 70 would have been Oakland's pick in the 8th round but was skipped. Pick 71 was a deferred Oakland pick and is shown in round four.

=== Round 9 ===
Pick #	AFL Team	Player	Position	College
74	Miami Dolphins	Bill Matan	Defensive end	Kansas State
75	Boston Patriots	Doug Satcher	Linebacker	Southern Mississippi
76	Denver Broncos	Ronald Sbranti	Linebacker	Utah State
77	Houston Oilers	Dick Suffel	Defensive back	Texas State
78	New York Jets	James Jones	End	Nebraska-Omaha
79	Kansas City Chiefs	Dick Smith	Defensive back	Northwestern
80	Oakland Raiders	Clifton Kinney	Linebacker	San Diego State
81	San Diego Chargers	Taft Reed	Defensive back	Jackson State
82	Buffalo Bills	Jim Carter	Defensive end	Tennessee State

=== Round 10 ===
Pick #	AFL Team	Player	Position	College
83	Miami Dolphins	Pat Killorin	Center	Syracuse
84	Boston Patriots	Dennis Brewster	Tackle	BYU
85	Denver Broncos	Larry Cox	Defensive tackle	Abilene Christian
86	Houston Oilers	Wilbur Aylor	Defensive tackle	Texas State
87	New York Jets	Bill Wolski	Fullback	Notre Dame
88	Kansas City Chiefs	Fred Dawston	Defensive back	South Carolina State
89	Oakland Raiders	Tony Jeter	Tight end	Nebraska
90	San Diego Chargers	Dan Pride	Linebacker	Jackson State
91	Buffalo Bills	Bobby Crockett	Split End	Arkansas

=== Round 11 ===
Pick #	AFL Team	Player	Position	College
92	Miami Dolphins	Sammy Price	Running back	Illinois
93	New York Jets ^{(Pick acquired from Boston)}	Gerry Allen	Running back	Nebraska-Omaha
94	Denver Broncos	James Burns	Guard	Northwestern
95	Houston Oilers	Monte Ledbetter	Wide receiver	Northwestern State
96	New York Jets	Bob Walton	Tackle	Auburn
97	Kansas City Chiefs	Willie Ray Smith	Defensive back	Kansas
98	Oakland Raiders	Joe Labruzzo	Halfback	Louisiana State
99	San Diego Chargers	Terry Owens	Tackle	Jacksonville State
100	Buffalo Bills	Dale Stewart	Halfback	Pittsburgh

=== Round 12 ===
Pick #	AFL Team	Player	Position	College
101	Miami Dolphins	Howard Twilley	Wide receiver	Tulsa
102	Boston Patriots	Dick Fugere	Linebacker	Cincinnati
103	New York Jets ^{(Pick acquired from Denver)}	Steve Chomyszak	Defensive tackle	Syracuse
104	Houston Oilers	Harry Day	Defensive end	Memphis
105	New York Jets	Ken Hollister	Defensive end	Indiana
106	Kansas City Chiefs	Bill Bonds	Defensive back	McMurry
107	Oakland Raiders	Wayne Foster	Tackle	Washington State
108	San Diego Chargers	Ray Jones	Halfback	Cal State Los Angeles
109	Buffalo Bills	Wayne DeSutter	Tackle	Western Illinois

=== Round 13 ===
Pick #	AFL Team	Player	Position	College
110	Miami Dolphins	Kent Kramer	Tight end	Minnesota
111	Boston Patriots	Tom Carr	Fullback	Bates
112	Denver Broncos	Eric Crabtree	Wide receiver	Pittsburgh
113	Houston Oilers	Fred Zimmerman	Linebacker	Toledo
114	New York Jets	Stas Maliszewski	Linebacker	Princeton
115	Kansas City Chiefs	Wayne Walker	Punter	Northwestern State
116	Oakland Raiders	John Niland	Guard	Iowa
117	San Diego Chargers	Houston Ridge	Defensive end	San Diego State
118	Buffalo Bills	Al McFarlane	Halfback	Louisville

=== Round 14 ===
Pick #	AFL Team	Player	Position	College
119	Miami Dolphins	Phil Scoggin	Kicker	Texas A&M
120	Boston Patriots	Bob Hall	Defensive back	Brown
121	Denver Broncos	Fred Forsberg	Linebacker	Washington
122	Houston Oilers	Dave Lince	Tight end	North Dakota
123	New York Jets	Stan Quintana	Defensive back	New Mexico
124	Kansas City Chiefs	Charley Harraway	Running back	San Jose State
125	Oakland Raiders	Mike Johnson	Defensive back	Kansas
126	San Diego Chargers	Mike London	Linebacker	Wisconsin
127	Buffalo Bills	Tony Golmont	Defensive back	North Carolina State

=== Round 15 ===
Pick #	AFL Team	Player	Position	College
128	Miami Dolphins	Jerry Oliver	Tackle	Texas State
129	Boston Patriots	Billy Laird	Quarterback	Louisiana Tech
130	Denver Broncos	Mike Ringer	Defensive back	Oklahoma
131	Houston Oilers	Tom Dillard	Tackle	Austin Peay State
132	New York Jets	Bill Cody	Linebacker	Auburn
133	Kansas City Chiefs	Bruce Van Dyke	Guard	Missouri
134	Oakland Raiders	Steve Renko	Fullback	Kansas
135	San Diego Chargers	Shelly Novack	End	Long Beach State
136	Buffalo Bills	Allen Smith	Running back	Fort Valley State

=== Round 16 ===
Pick #	AFL Team	Player	Position	College
137	Miami Dolphins	Don Lorenz	Defensive end	Stephen F. Austin
138	Boston Patriots	Buddy Owens	Guard	Michigan State
139	Denver Broncos	Frank Rogers	Kicker	Colorado
140	Houston Oilers	Steve Smith	Tackle	Michigan
141	New York Jets	Ron Acks	Linebacker	Illinois
142	Kansas City Chiefs	Tom Barrington	Running back	Ohio State
143	Oakland Raiders	Craig Ritchey	Defensive back	Stanford
144	San Diego Chargers	Bill Scott	Defensive back	Idaho
145	Buffalo Bills	Ed Russell	Tackle	Illinois

=== Round 17 ===
Pick #	AFL Team	Player	Position	College
146	Miami Dolphins	Mike Bender	Guard	Arkansas
147	Boston Patriots	Dick Capp	Tight end	Boston College
148	Denver Broncos	Gary Eickman	Defensive end	Illinois
149	Houston Oilers	Lyle Loebach	Tackle	Simpson
150	New York Jets	Tommy Tolleson	Wide receiver	Alabama
151	Kansas City Chiefs	Walt Garrison	Running back	Oklahoma State
152	Oakland Raiders	Ted Holman	Defensive back	Syracuse
153	San Diego Chargers	Ron Ogle	Defensive tackle	Long Beach State
154	Buffalo Bills	Bill Earhart	Defensive tackle	Bowling Green

=== Round 18 ===
Pick #	AFL Team	Player	Position	College
155	Miami Dolphins	Rich Kestner	End	Kentucky
156	Boston Patriots	John Pincavage	End	Virginia
157	Denver Broncos	Tom Talaga	Tackle	Notre Dame
158	Houston Oilers	Ed Buzzell	Quarterback	Ottawa
159	New York Jets	Gerry Mosher	End	California
160	Kansas City Chiefs	Hal Seymour	Defensive back	Florida
161	Oakland Raiders	Art Robinson	End	Florida A&M
162	San Diego Chargers	John Travis	Fullback	San Jose State
163	Buffalo Bills	Greg Lashutka	End	Ohio State

=== Round 19 ===
Pick #	AFL Team	Player	Position	College
164	Miami Dolphins	Doug Moreau	Tight end	Louisiana State
165	Boston Patriots	Joe Novogratz	Guard	Pittsburgh
166	Denver Broncos	Tom Coughlin	Defensive end	Miami
167	Houston Oilers	Frank Fuller	Defensive tackle	Drake
168	New York Jets	Preston Ridlehuber	Running back	Georgia
169	Kansas City Chiefs	Bob Dunlevy	End	West Virginia
170	Oakland Raiders	Jack Shinholser	Linebacker	Florida State
171	San Diego Chargers	Jerome Bell	End	Central Oklahoma
172	Buffalo Bills	Mel Phillips	Defensive back	North Carolina A&T

=== Round 20 ===
Pick #	AFL Team	Player	Position	College
173	Miami Dolphins	John Tooker	Defensive back	Adams State
174	Boston Patriots	Paul Soule	Halfback	Bowdoin
175	Denver Broncos	Cliff Hysell	Tackle	Montana State
176	Houston Oilers	Dave Odegaard	Center	Bemidji State
177	New York Jets	Randy Schultz	Running back	Northern Iowa
178	Kansas City Chiefs	Mike Garrett	Running back	USC
179	Oakland Raiders	Steve Bowman	Halfback	Alabama
180	San Diego Chargers	Bill McDowell	Linebacker	Florida State
181	Buffalo Bills	Ken McLean	End	Texas A&M

== Redshirt draft ==
=== Red Shirt Round one ===
Pick #	NFL team	Player	Position	College
1	Miami Dolphins	John Roderick	End	Southern Methodist
2	Boston Patriots	Willie Townes	Tackle	Tulsa
3	Denver Broncos	Nick Eddy	Halfback	Notre Dame
4	Houston Oilers	Tom Fisher	Linebacker	Tennessee
5	New York Jets	Don Parker	End	Virginia
6	Kansas City Chiefs	George Youngblood	End – Defensive back	Cal State Los Angeles
7	Oakland Raiders	Rod Sherman	Halfback	USC
8	San Diego Chargers	Bob Windsor	End	Kentucky
9	Buffalo Bills	Jack Gregory	End	Delta State

=== Red Shirt Round two ===
Pick #	NFL team	Player	Position	College
10	Miami Dolphins	Danny Fulford	End	Auburn
11	Boston Patriots	Ken Avery	Linebacker	Southern Mississippi
12	Denver Broncos	Pete Duranko	End	Notre Dame
13	Houston Oilers	Tim Van Galder	Quarterback	Iowa State
14	New York Jets	Austin Denney	End	Tennessee
15	Kansas City Chiefs	Bob Pickens	Tackle	Nebraska
16	Oakland Raiders	Tom Cichowski	Tackle	Maryland
17	San Diego Chargers	Diron Talbert	Tackle	Texas
18	Buffalo Bills	Johnnie Robinson	End	Tennessee State

=== Red Shirt Round three ===
Pick #	NFL team	Player	Position	College
19	Miami Dolphins	Jack Clancy	End	Michigan
20	Boston Patriots	Ed Toner	Guard	Massachusetts
21	Denver Broncos	Dick Arndt	Tackle	Idaho
22	Houston Oilers	Ralph Dunlap	Defensive tackle	Baylor
23	New York Jets	Jerry Lovelace	Halfback	Texas Tech
24	Kansas City Chiefs	Jan Stenerud	Kicker	Montana State
25	Oakland Raiders	Ronnie Parson	End	Austin Peay State
26	San Diego Chargers	Jeff Staggs	Linebacker	San Diego State
27	Buffalo Bills	Tony King	End	Findlay

=== Red Shirt Round four ===
Pick #	NFL team	Player	Position	College
28	Miami Dolphins	Jim Mankins	Fullback	Florida State
29	Boston Patriots	Heath Wingate	Tackle	Bowling Green
30	Denver Broncos	Mark Gartung	Tackle	Oregon State
31	Houston Oilers	Bill Davis	Quarterback	Lamar
32	New York Jets	Tommy Burnett	End	Arkansas
33	Kansas City Chiefs	Dan Berry	Halfback	California
34	Oakland Raiders	John Crumbacher	Tackle	Tennessee
35	San Diego Chargers	LaVerle Pratt	Linebacker	Idaho
36	Buffalo Bills	Dick Cunningham	Linebacker	Arkansas

=== Red Shirt Round five ===
Pick #	NFL team	Player	Position	College
37	Miami Dolphins	Fritz Greenlee	Linebacker	Northern Arizona
38	Boston Patriots	Ray Perkins	End	Alabama
39	Denver Broncos	Art Hatfield	End	Cal State Los Angeles
40	Houston Oilers	Dick Glover	Tackle	Virginia State
41	New York Jets	Ray Miller	Tackle	Idaho
42	Kansas City Chiefs	Lynn Senkbeil	Linebacker	Nebraska
43	Oakland Raiders	George Patton	Tackle	Georgia
44	San Diego Chargers	Rhome Nixon	End	Southern University
45	Buffalo Bills	Dick Czap	Tackle	Nebraska

=== Red Shirt Round six ===
Pick #	NFL team	Player	Position	College
46	Miami Dolphins	Bill Darnall	Wide receiver	North Carolina
47	Boston Patriots	Joe Avezzano	Guard	Florida State
48	Denver Broncos	Jerry Durling	Tackle	Wyoming
49	Houston Oilers	John Gary	Defensive tackle	Grambling State
50	New York Jets	Allen Smith	Halfback	Findlay
51	Kansas City Chiefs	Dick Reding	Defensive back	Northwestern State
52	Oakland Raiders	Dan Archer	Tackle	Oregon
53	San Diego Chargers	Joe Beauchamp	End – Defensive back	Iowa State
54	Buffalo Bills	Leroy Carter	Halfback	Grambling State

=== Red Shirt Round seven ===
Pick #	NFL team	Player	Position	College
55	Miami Dolphins	Don Williams	Defensive tackle	Wofford
56	Boston Patriots	Brent Caston	Defensive back	Mississippi
57	Denver Broncos	John Mason	End	Stanford
58	Houston Oilers	Clyde Pettaway	Tackle	North Carolina A&T
59	New York Jets	Randy Smith	Linebacker	Clemson
60	Kansas City Chiefs	Bill Ogle	Tackle	Stanford
61	Oakland Raiders	Bill Thomas	Halfback	Oklahoma
62	San Diego Chargers	Saint Saffold	End	San Jose State
63	Buffalo Bills	Dick Weeks	Back	Texas-El Paso

=== Red Shirt Round eight ===
Pick #	NFL team	Player	Position	College
64	Miami Dolphins	Jon Brittenum	Quarterback	Arkansas
65	Boston Patriots	Tom Schaefer	Fullback	Tennessee-Chattanooga
66	Denver Broncos	Henry Sorrell	Linebacker	Tennessee-Chattanooga
67	Houston Oilers	Roger Marshall	Quarterback	Baylor
68	New York Jets	Joe Campbell	Defensive back	Auburn
69	Kansas City Chiefs	Mel Myricks	Defensive back	Washburn
70	Oakland Raiders	Ray Schmautz	Linebacker	San Diego State
71	San Diego Chargers	Brad Hubbert	Halfback	Arizona
72	Buffalo Bills	Monroe Phelps	Halfback	Missouri

=== Red Shirt Round nine ===
Pick #	NFL team	Player	Position	College
73	Miami Dolphins	Craig Baynham	End	Georgia Tech
74	Boston Patriots	Jack White	Quarterback	Penn State
75	Denver Broncos	Bud Harrington	Fullback	Tulsa
76	Houston Oilers	Lee Garner	Linebacker	Mississippi
77	New York Jets	John Stipech	Tackle	Utah
78	Kansas City Chiefs	Perry Parks	Defensive tackle	Cal State Los Angeles
79	San Diego Chargers	Wayne Page	Defensive back	Clemson
80	Oakland Raiders	Mel Tom	Linebacker	San Jose State
81	Buffalo Bills	Ed King	Linebacker	USC

=== Red Shirt Round ten ===
Pick #	NFL team	Player	Position	College
82	Miami Dolphins	Randy Winkler	Tackle	Tarleton State
83	Boston Patriots	Bob Ellis	Halfback	Massachusetts
84	Denver Broncos	Andre White	End	Florida A&M
85	Houston Oilers	Dan Goich	Tackle	California
86	New York Jets	Dick Fitzgerald	Tackle	Nebraska
87	Kansas City Chiefs	Elmer Collett	Center	San Francisco State
88	Oakland Raiders	Joe O'Brien	Fullback	Texas–Arlington
89	San Diego Chargers	Wayne Becker	Tackle	Montana
90	Buffalo Bills	Bill Moorer	Center	Georgia Tech

=== Red Shirt Round eleven ===
Pick #	NFL team	Player	Position	College
91	Miami Dolphins	Kai Anderson	Center	Illinois
92	Boston Patriots	Jerry Marion	Halfback	Wyoming
93	Denver Broncos	Mike Sullivan	End	Oregon State
94	Houston Oilers	Chuck Arkwright	Tackle	Georgia
95	New York Jets	Jim Kollman	Guard	Oregon
96	Kansas City Chiefs	Denis Moore	Tackle	USC
97	San Diego Chargers	Hugh Wright	Fullback	Adams State
98	Oakland Raiders	Mike Brundage	Quarterback	Oregon
99	Buffalo Bills	Benny Russell	Quarterback	Louisville

== Notable undrafted players ==
^{†}	= Pro Bowler	‡	= Hall of Famer

Original NFL team	Player	Pos.	College	Notes
Denver Broncos	Larry Kaminski ^{†}	C	Purdue	
Denver Broncos	Pat Matson	G	Oregon	
Kansas City Chiefs	Andy Rice	DT	Texas Southern	
Kansas City Chiefs	Emmitt Thomas^{‡}	CB	Bishop	
Miami Dolphins	Ron Berger	DT/DE	Wayne State	
Miami Dolphins	Bob Bruggers	LB	Minnesota	
Miami Dolphins	George Chesser	P	Delta State	
Miami Dolphins	John Dockery	S	Harvard	
Miami Dolphins	Bob Neff	CB	Stephen F. Austin	
Miami Dolphins	Karl Noonan ^{†}	WR	Iowa	
New York Jets	Paul Crane	C	Alabama	
Oakland Raiders	Rich Jackson ^{†}	DE	Southern	
Denver Broncos	Lonnie Wright	S	Colorado State	Played college basketball, not football

== See also ==
- 1966 NFL draft
