= Satcher =

Satcher is a surname. Notable people with the surname include:

- David Satcher (born 1941), American physician
- Doug Satcher (born 1945), American football player
- Leslie Satcher (born 1962), American singer-songwriter
- Robert Satcher (born 1965), American physician, chemical engineer and NASA astronaut
