= Joe DiVito =

American football player (born 1945)

No. 12
- Positions: Quarterback, Punter

Personal information
- Born: September 2, 1945 (age 81); Lynn, Massachusetts, U.S.
- Listed height: 6 ft 2 in (1.88 m)
- Listed weight: 205 lb (93 kg)

Career information
- High school: St. Mary's (Lynn)
- College: Boston College (1964-1967)
- NFL draft: 1968: undrafted

Career history
- Denver Broncos (1968); Hartford Knights (1970)

Career AFL statistics
- Punts: 8
- Punting yards: 242
- Longest punt: 47
- Stats at Pro Football Reference

Joseph Charles DiVito (born September 2, 1945) is an American former college and professional football quarterback and punter for the Boston College Eagles and the Denver Broncos of the American Football League (AFL).

== College career ==
DiVito played at Boston College from 1965 to 1967. He completed 80 of 180 passes for 1,138 yards, 14 touchdowns, and 6 interceptions. He was a team captain and, in addition to playing quarterback, also played as a punter.

== Professional career ==
=== Denver Broncos ===
DiVito was one of eight quarterbacks to try out for the American Football League's Denver Broncos in 1968, including Steve Tensi, Jim LeClair, John McCormick, and Marlin Briscoe. He was named the backup quarterback behind incumbent starter Steve Tensi. After Tensi broke his collarbone, DiVito got his chance to be the Broncos #1 quarterback. He completed only 1 of 6 passes for 16 yards before being replaced by wide receiver/defensive back Marlin Briscoe. He also completed 8 punts for a total of 242 yards and a net average of 30.3 yards per punt.

=== Hartford Knights ===
He was cut following the 1969 training camp and signed with the Hartford Knights of the Atlantic Coast Football League in 1970.

== See also ==
- Other American Football League players, coaches, and contributors
