= Rudy Barber =

American football player (born 1943)

No. 72
- Position: Linebacker

Personal information
- Born: December 24, 1943 (age 82); Auburndale, Florida, U.S.
- Listed height: 6 ft 1 in (1.85 m)
- Listed weight: 255 lb (116 kg)

Career information
- College: Bethune–Cookman
- NFL draft: 1966: undrafted

Career history
- Kansas City Chiefs (1966)*; Miami Dolphins (1968)
- * Offseason or practice squad member only

Career NFL statistics
- Games played: 2
- Stats at Pro Football Reference

Rudolph Barber (born December 24, 1943) is a former collegiate and professional American football linebacker. He played college football at Bethune-Cookman, and played professionally in the American Football League for the Miami Dolphins in 1968.

He currently pastors a church in Carol City, Florida, and serves as the chaplain to the neighboring Miami Carol City Chiefs Football team. It is the same school which he coached at for several years and sent three of his children—Rudy Barber Jr, Kantroy Barber, and Misti Barber—who all went on to win All Dade honors and athlete of the year, and compete on the Division I college level. Rudy Jr, played on the University of Miami national championship teams in 1989 and 1991, and Kantroy played with the New England Patriots during their Super Bowl run which ended with a loss to the eventual champions Green Bay Packers in New Orleans. Misti was formerly a member of the University of Miami track and field team. Recently Barber's grandson Quynn attended Carol City becoming a two sport star playing every offensive down his senior year, and gaining All Dade Honors and a state qualifier in the shot put on his track team.

== See also ==
- List of American Football League players
