= Billy Clay =

American football player (born 1944)

No. 32
- Position: Cornerback

Personal information
- Born: April 28, 1944 (age 82); Oxford, Mississippi, U.S.
- Listed height: 6 ft 1 in (1.85 m)
- Listed weight: 195 lb (88 kg)

Career information
- High school: Enterprise (Enterprise, Mississippi); Pearl (Pearl, Mississippi)
- College: Mississippi (1962–1965)
- NFL draft: 1966: 4th round, 53rd overall pick
- AFL draft: 1966: 5th round, 36th overall pick

Career history
- Washington Redskins (1966)

Career NFL statistics
- Interceptions: 1
- Stats at Pro Football Reference

William Frank Clay (born April 28, 1944) is an American former professional football player who was a cornerback for the Washington Redskins of the National Football League (NFL). He played college football for the Ole Miss Rebels and was selected in the fourth round of the 1966 NFL draft. Clay was also selected in the fifth round of the 1966 AFL draft by the Denver Broncos.
