= Dan Goich =

American football player (born 1944)

No. 74, 72, 77, 68
- Position: Defensive tackle

Personal information
- Born: April 30, 1944; Chicago, Illinois, U.S.
- Died: March 29, 2021 (aged 76); Las Vegas, Nevada, U.S.
- Listed height: 6 ft 4 in (1.93 m)
- Listed weight: 240 lb (109 kg)

Career information
- High school: Mount Carmel (Chicago)
- College: California (1965–1966)
- NFL draft: 1966: 8th round, 121st overall pick
- AFL draft: 1966: Red Shirt 10th round, 85th overall pick

Career history
- Hartford Charter Oaks (1967); Detroit Lions (1969–1970); New Orleans Saints (1971); New York Giants (1972–1973)

Career NFL statistics
- Fumble recoveries: 5
- Sacks: 6
- Stats at Pro Football Reference

Dan Goich (April 30, 1944 – March 29, 2021) was a former professional American football player who played defensive lineman for five seasons for the Detroit Lions, New Orleans Saints, and New York Giants.
