= John Kelly (offensive lineman) =

American football player (1944–2015)

No. 75
- Position: Tackle

Personal information
- Born: March 31, 1944; Fort Lauderdale, Florida, U.S.
- Died: October 28, 2015 (aged 71)
- Listed height: 6 ft 3 in (1.91 m)
- Listed weight: 250 lb (113 kg)

Career information
- High school: Dillard (Fort Lauderdale, Florida)
- College: Florida A&M
- NFL draft: 1966: 20th round, 295th overall pick

Career history
- Washington Redskins (1966–1967)

Career NFL statistics
- Games played: 16
- Stats at Pro Football Reference

John Douglas "Big John" Kelly (March 31, 1944 – October 28, 2015) was an American professional football offensive lineman in the National Football League (NFL) for the Washington Redskins. He played college football at Florida A&M University and was selected in the 20th round of the 1966 NFL draft as the 295th pick by the Washington Redskins.
