= Charlie Bryant =

American football player (1941–2001)

No. 30, 32, 29, 35
- Position: Running back

Personal information
- Born: March 7, 1941; Lake View, South Carolina, U.S.
- Died: October 19, 2001 (aged 60); Florence, South Carolina, U.S.
- Listed height: 6 ft 0 in (1.83 m)
- Listed weight: 207 lb (94 kg)

Career information
- High school: Columbus (Lake View)
- College: Allen (1965)
- NFL draft: 1966: 9th round, 135th overall pick

Career history
- St. Louis Cardinals (1966–1967); Atlanta Falcons (1968–1969); Winnipeg Blue Bombers (1970–1971); Edmonton Eskimos (1971)

Career NFL statistics
- Rushing yards: 322
- Rushing average: 4.8
- Receptions: 3
- Receiving yards: 26
- Stats at Pro Football Reference

Charles Limar Bryant (March 7, 1941 – October 19, 2001) was an American professional football running back who played four seasons in the National Football League (NFL) with the St. Louis Cardinals and Atlanta Falcons. He played college football at Allen and was selected by the Cardinals in the ninth round of the 1966 NFL draft. He was also a member of the Winnipeg Blue Bombers and Edmonton Eskimos of the Canadian Football League (CFL).

== Early life and college ==
Charles Limar Bryant was born on March 7, 1941, in Lake View, South Carolina. He attended Columbus High School in Lake View. He played college football for the Allen Yellow Jackets of Allen University.

== Professional career ==
Bryant was selected by the St. Louis Cardinals in the ninth round, with the 135th overall pick, of the 1966 NFL draft. He played in four games for the Cardinals in 1966, rushing five times for 31 yards and returning two kicks for 70 yards. He appeared in all 14 games during the 1967 season, totaling three carries for 16 yards, 14 kick returns for 324 yards, and one fumble.

On September 3, 1968, Bryant was traded to the Atlanta Falcons for an undisclosed draft pick. On September 7, 1968, he had a 44-yard touchdown reception during a preseason game against the Miami Dolphins. He played in two games, starting one, for the Falcons during the 1968 season, recording nine rushing attempts for 29 yards, one reception for 11 yards, five kick returns for 112 yards, two fumbles, and one fumble recovery. He appeared in all 14 games during the 1969 season, rushing 50 times for 246 yards, catching two passes for 15 yards, returning 21 kicks for 407 yards, fumbling twice, and recovering two fumbles. Bryant was released by the Falcons on September 7, 1970.

Bryant played in six games for the Winnipeg Blue Bombers of the Canadian Football League (CFL) in 1970, accumulating 46 carries for 246 yards and one touchdown, six catches for 39 yards and one touchdown, and six kick returns for 157 yards. He appeared in three games for the Blue Bombers in 1971, recording 29 rushing attempts for 107 yards, five receptions for 94 yards, and three kick returns for 50 yards.

Bryant finished the 1971 CFL season by playing in six games for the Edmonton Eskimos, totaling 38 carries for 228 yards and two touchdowns, 11 catches for 140 yards, and three kick returns for 83 yards.

== Personal life ==
Bryant died on October 19, 2001, in Florence, South Carolina.
