= Billy Johnson (defensive back) =

American football player (born 1943)

No. 47
- Position: Defensive back

Personal information
- Born: February 19, 1943 (age 83); Stanton, Nebraska, U.S.
- Listed height: 5 ft 10 in (1.78 m)
- Listed weight: 180 lb (82 kg)

Career information
- High school: Staunton
- College: Nebraska
- NFL draft: 1966: undrafted

Career history
- Boston Patriots (1966–1970)

Career NFL statistics
- Interceptions: 2
- Fumble recoveries: 3
- Stats at Pro Football Reference

William Walter Johnson (born February 19, 1943) is an American former professional football player who was a defensive back for the Boston Patriots of the National Football League (NFL). He played college football for the Nebraska Cornhuskers.
