= Dan Archer =

American football player (born 1944)

No. 78
- Position: Offensive lineman

Personal information
- Born: September 29, 1944 (age 82); Grand Rapids, Michigan, U.S.
- Listed height: 6 ft 5 in (1.96 m)
- Listed weight: 249 lb (113 kg)

Career information
- High school: Thomas Downey (Modesto, California)
- College: Oregon
- AFL draft: 1966: red shirt 6th round, 52nd overall pick

Career history
- Oakland Raiders (1967); Cincinnati Bengals (1968)

Awards and highlights
- AFL champion (1967)

Career statistics
- Games played: 22
- Games started: 0
- Fumble recoveries: 1
- Stats at Pro Football Reference

Daniel G. Archer (born September 29, 1944) is an American former professional football player who was an offensive tackle in the American Football League (AFL). He played college football for the Oregon Ducks, and then professionally for the Oakland Raiders in 1967 and for the Cincinnati Bengals in 1968. He lives in Belvedere-Tiburon, California.

Raised in Modesto, California, Mr. Archer studied architecture for four years at the University of Oregon, but drafted by the Army before receiving his degree. He instead joined the Army Reserves, which afforded him the opportunity to play professional football for two years; the highlight of this brief career was his participation in Super Bowl II with the Oakland Raiders. He finished his education and received his degree in 1971 in architecture, with honors, from the College of Environmental Design at the University of California, Berkeley. He is a licensed architect with interests in theater, classical music and bicycling. He is married and has two sons and one daughter and has lived in Mill Valley, California since 1982 but moved to Belvedere-Tiburon, California in 2020

== See also ==
- List of American Football League players
