= Bill Wolski =

American football player (1944–2006)

No. 44
- Position: Fullback

Personal information
- Born: May 23, 1944; Muskegon, Michigan, U.S.
- Died: March 5, 2006 (aged 61); Atlanta, Georgia, U.S.
- Listed height: 5 ft 11 in (1.80 m)
- Listed weight: 203 lb (92 kg)

Career information
- High school: Muskegon Catholic
- College: Notre Dame
- NFL draft: 1966: 5th round, 65th overall pick
- AFL draft: 1966: 10th round, 87th overall pick

Career history
- Atlanta Falcons (1966–1967)

Awards and highlights
- National champion (1964); Third-team All-American (1965)

Career NFL statistics
- Games played: 2
- Kickoff returns: 1
- Kickoff return yards: 21
- Stats at Pro Football Reference

Williams Frank Wolski (May 23, 1944 – March 5, 2006) was an American professional football player who was a fullback for one season with the Atlanta Falcons of the National Football League (NFL). He played college football for the Notre Dame Fighting Irish.

== Early life and education ==
Bill Wolski was born on May 23, 1944, in Muskegon, Michigan, where he attended Muskegon Catholic Central High School. He went to college at the University of Notre Dame. Wolski did not play football in 1962. In 1963, he had 70 rushes for 320 yards and two touchdowns, and three catches for 11 yards. In 1964, he was Notre Dame's leading rusher; he had 136 rushes for 657 yards and 9 touchdowns. Wolski had eight receptions for 130 yards and two touchdowns. He had 11 total touchdowns in 1964. In 1965, he had 103 rush attempts for 452 yards and eight touchdowns, five of which were in one game. He had one catch for eight yards.

=== Career statistics ===
Year	Games	Att	Yds	Avg	TD	Rec	RecYds	RecAvg	RecTD
1963	9	70	320	4.6	2	3	11	3.7	0
1964	10	136	657	4.8	9	8	130	16.3	2
1965	10	103	452	4.4	8	1	8	8.0	0
Career	29	309	1429	4.6	19	12	149	12.4	2

== Professional career ==
=== Atlanta Falcons ===
Wolski was selected in the 1966 AFL draft (10th round, 87th overall, by the New York Jets) and in the 1966 NFL draft (5th round, 65th overall, by the Atlanta Falcons). He chose to play for the Atlanta Falcons. He played in two games for the Falcons. His only stat was a 21-yard kickoff return. He had a knee injury the next year and chose to retire.

== Personal life and death ==
For 38 years, Wolski was a real-estate developer. After football, he moved back to Michigan where he raised horses. He had one son. Wolski died on March 5, 2006, of melanoma. He was 61 at the time of his death.
