= Heath Wingate =

American football player (born 1944)

No. 51, 52
- Position: Center

Personal information
- Born: December 5, 1944 (age 81); Toledo, Ohio, U.S.
- Listed height: 6 ft 2 in (1.88 m)
- Listed weight: 240 lb (109 kg)

Career information
- High school: Whitmer (Toledo)
- College: Bowling Green (1963-1966)
- NFL draft: 1966: 13th round, 191st overall pick
- AFL draft: 1966: Red Shirt 4th round, 29th overall pick

Career history
- Virginia Sailors (1967); Washington Redskins (1967)

Career NFL statistics
- Games played: 3
- Stats at Pro Football Reference

Heath L. Wingate (born December 5, 1944) is an American former professional football player who was a center for the Washington Redskins of the National Football League (NFL). He played college football for the Bowling Green Falcons and was selected in the 13th round of the 1966 NFL draft.
