= Fritz Greenlee =

American football player (born 1943)

No. 36, 73, 89, 59, 51
- Position: Linebacker

Personal information
- Born: November 5, 1943 (age 83); Des Moines, Iowa, U.S.
- Listed height: 6 ft 2 in (1.88 m)
- Listed weight: 230 lb (104 kg)

Career information
- High school: Franklin (Seattle, Washington)
- College: Air Force (1962–1964); Northern Arizona (1965–1966)
- NFL draft: 1966: 9th round, 137th overall pick
- AFL draft: 1966: Red Shirt 5th round, 37th overall pick

Career history
- Eugene Bombers (1967); Montreal Alouettes (1968); Sacramento Capitols (1968–1969); San Francisco 49ers (1969); Edmonton Eskimos (1970)
- Stats at Pro Football Reference

William Frederick Greenlee (born November 5, 1943) is an American former professional football player who was a linebacker in the National Football League (NFL) and Canadian Football League (CFL). He played college football for the Northern Arizona Lumberjacks and was selected by the Chicago Bears 137th overall in the ninth round of the 1966 NFL draft. Greenlee played in the CFL for the Montreal Alouettes in 1968, the NFL's San Francisco 49ers in 1969 and back in the CFL with the Edmonton Eskimos in 1970.
