= Randy Minniear =

American football player (1943–2023)

No. 27
- Position: Running back

Personal information
- Born: December 27, 1943; Indianapolis, Indiana, U.S.
- Died: August 13, 2023 (aged 79); Nashville, Indiana, U.S.
- Listed height: 6 ft 1 in (1.85 m)
- Listed weight: 210 lb (95 kg)

Career information
- High school: Broad Ripple (Indianapolis)
- College: Purdue (1962-1965)
- NFL draft: 1966: 20th round, 301st overall pick

Career history
- New York Giants (1966–1969); Cleveland Browns (1970)

Career NFL statistics
- Rushing yards: 316
- Rushing average: 3.3
- Receptions: 19
- Receiving yards: 148
- Total touchdowns: 6
- Stats at Pro Football Reference

Randall Harry Minniear (December 27, 1943 – August 13, 2023) was an American professional football player who was a running back in the National Football League (NFL). He played college football for the Purdue Boilermakers. He played in the NFL for the New York Giants from 1966 to 1969 and for the Cleveland Browns in 1970.

Minniear died on August 13, 2023, at the age of 79.
