= Ron Meyer (quarterback) =

American football player (1944–2018)

No. 11, 7
- Position: Quarterback

Personal information
- Born: October 27, 1944; Austin, Minnesota, U.S.
- Died: May 7, 2018 (aged 73); Windom, Minnesota, U.S.
- Listed height: 6 ft 4 in (1.93 m)
- Listed weight: 205 lb (93 kg)

Career information
- High school: Wells (Wells, Minnesota)
- College: South Dakota State (1962–1965)
- NFL draft: 1966: 7th round, 107th overall pick

Career history
- Chicago Bears (1966)*; Pittsburgh Steelers (1966); Wheeling Ironmen (1966)
- * Offseason or practice squad member only

Awards and highlights
- 2× All-NCC (1963, 1964)

Career NFL statistics
- TD–INT: 0–1
- Passing yards: 59
- Passer rating: 23.8
- Stats at Pro Football Reference

Ron Meyer (August 27, 1944 – May 7, 2018) was an American professional football player who was a quarterback for one season with the Pittsburgh Steelers of the National Football League (NFL). He played college football for the South Dakota State Jackrabbits.

== Early life ==
Meyer was born in Austin, Minnesota and grew up in Wells, Minnesota. He attended Wells High School where he was a four sport athlete, playing football, basketball and baseball and also was a pole vaulter on the track and field team.

== College career ==
At South Dakota State University, Meyer was a three-year starter at quarterback for the Jackrabbits. As a sophomore he threw a then-school record 19 touchdown passes and was named All-North Central Conference (NCC). He was named All-NCC again after setting a new record for passing yards in a season with 1,385 in his junior season. Meyer finished his collegiate career with 3,608 passing yards and 41 career touchdown passes. Meyer also played baseball for two seasons as a first baseman and pitcher on South Dakota State's baseball team and played one season of basketball for the Jackrabbits.

== Professional career ==
Meyer was selected in the seventh round of the 1966 NFL Draft by the Chicago Bears. He was cut during training camp. He was later signed by the Pittsburgh Steelers and spent most of the season on the team's taxi squad and briefly was a member of the Wheeling Ironmen of the Continental Football League. Meyer played in four games for the Steelers, completing seven of 19 pass attempts for 59 yards with one interception.

== Post-football life ==
After the end of his playing career Meyer returned to South Dakota State to complete his degree in education, graduating in 1968. He was a teacher and coach at Windom High School in Windom, Minnesota for 33 years before retiring in 2001. Meyer died on May 7, 2018.
