= Randy Winkler =

American football player (born 1943)

No. 77, 64, 63
- Positions: Tackle, Guard

Personal information
- Born: July 18, 1943 (age 83); Temple, Texas, U.S.
- Listed height: 6 ft 5 in (1.96 m)
- Listed weight: 255 lb (116 kg)

Career information
- High school: Belton (TX)
- College: Tarleton State (1963–1966)
- NFL draft: 1966: 12th round, 178th overall pick
- AFL draft: 1966: Red Shirt 10th round, 82nd overall pick

Career history

Playing
- Detroit Lions (1967); Atlanta Falcons (1968); Green Bay Packers (1971)

Coaching
- Navy (1969–1970) Offensive line coach

Career NFL statistics
- Games played: 27
- Games started: 4
- Fumble recoveries: 1
- Stats at Pro Football Reference

Randolph Stanley Winkler (born July 18, 1943) is an American former professional football player. He played college football as a tackle and end for the Tarleton State Texans. He became Tarleton State's first National Football League (NFL) player when he was selected by the Detroit Lions in the 12th round of the 1966 NFL draft. Winkler went on to play three seasons in the league: one each for the Lions, Atlanta Falcons (as a guard) and Green Bay Packers. His playing career was interrupted by a two-year stint in the United States Naval Reserve, where he served as a coach for the Navy Midshipmen.

== Early life ==
Winkler was born on July 18, 1943, in Temple, Texas. He attended Belton High School in Belton, Texas, where he played football as a tackle. As a senior, he stood at 6 feet 1 inch (1.85 m) and weighed 210 pounds (95 kg), being a second-team all-district selection. His coach described him as "about as fast as anybody on the team. He's agile. He's just a real good football player". After high school, he decided to attend Tarleton State College.

Winkler attended Tarleton State from 1963 to 1966 and played for the Tarleton State Texans football team. Described as a "late bloomer", he grew to a height of 6 feet 4 inches (1.93 m) in college, ultimately weighing in at 240 pounds (110 kg) during his time with the Texans. He started out as an offensive tackle, playing three years in that position before playing as an end in his senior year. Winkler was named Tarleton State's most outstanding lineman as a sophomore in 1964, then in 1965 was their only selection to the Texas All-College football team selected by the Fort Worth Star-Telegram. It was one of two Texas All-College selections he received during his career. He was the team's only two-way player in 1966 and was nicknamed the "Jolly Green Giant" for his size and "ready smile". According to Tarleton State, Winkler was also an All-American during his collegiate career.

== Professional career ==
Winkler was selected by the Miami Dolphins in the 10th round (82nd overall) of the 1966 AFL redshirt draft and by the Detroit Lions in the 12th round (178th overall) of the 1966 NFL draft as a "future" player. He was one of several small-school players selected by the Lions; head coach Harry Gilmer, when asked Tarleton State, said that it was "Somewhere in Texas, I think". In December 1966, at the end of his college career, Winkler signed with the Lions, becoming his school's first-ever NFL player. He suffered a sprained knee shortly prior to the 1967 season and began the year on the taxi squad, before a promotion to the active roster in October 1967. Winkler then appeared in eight games for the Lions as an offensive tackle in 1967, all as a backup.

Winkler was released by the Lions at the start of the 1968 season, then later joined the taxi squad for the Atlanta Falcons. He later was promoted to play guard for the Falcons, appearing in 12 games, four as a starter, during the 1968 season. In June 1969, it was announced that he was drafted to serve in the United States Navy Reserve, making him unable to play that year. He served two years in the Naval Reserve and during that time worked as the offensive line coach for the Navy Midshipmen football team.

After leaving the Navy in 1971, Winkler returned to the Falcons, but was released in favor of several younger guards. After not being claimed by any team off waivers, he contacted the head coach at Navy, who then called several NFL teams. The Green Bay Packers became interested in Winkler as a result and signed him in August 1971. Initially on the taxi squad, he was called up to the active roster prior to the team's game against the Minnesota Vikings, replacing an injured Dave Bradley. He posted a tackle in the game while appearing on special teams, in what was his first NFL action in two and a half years. He played in seven games, all as a backup, for the Packers in 1971. Winkler was released prior to the 1972 season, ending his professional career. He finished with 27 NFL games played, four as a starter. He was inducted into the Tarleton State Athletics Hall of Fame in 1981 and to the Belton High School Wall of Honor.
