= Pat Killorin =

American football player (born 1944)

No. 55, 60
- Position: Center

Personal information
- Born: June 11, 1944 (age 82); Watertown, New York, U.S.
- Listed height: 6 ft 2 in (1.88 m)
- Listed weight: 220 lb (100 kg)

Career information
- High school: Watertown
- College: Syracuse (1962-1965)
- NFL draft: 1966: 3rd round, 35th overall pick
- AFL draft: 1966: 10th round, 83rd overall pick

Career history
- Pittsburgh Steelers (1966); Norfolk Neptunes (1967)

Awards and highlights
- First-team All-American (1964); Second-team All-American (1965); 2× First-team All-East (1964, 1965)

Career NFL statistics
- Games played: 5
- Stats at Pro Football Reference

Patrick Michael Killorin (born June 11, 1944) is an American former professional football player who was a center for the Pittsburgh Steelers of the National Football League (NFL). A native of Watertown, New York, Killorin played college football for the Syracuse Orange and was selected by the Associated Press as the first-team offensive center on the 1964 All-America team. Syracuse coach Ben Schwartzwalder credited Killorin's play with the success of the team's running backs Jim Nance and Floyd Little. He also played in the NFL for the Steelers in 1966, appearing in five games.
