= Dick Smith (defensive back) =

American football player (born 1944)

No. 28
- Position: Defensive back

Personal information
- Born: June 18, 1944 (age 82); Hamilton, Ohio, U.S.

Career information
- College: Northwestern
- AFL draft: 1966: 9th round, 79 (By the Kansas City Chiefs)th overall pick

Career history
- 1967–1968: Washington Redskins

Richard Henry Smith (born June 18, 1944) is an American former football defensive back in the National Football League (NFL) for the Washington Redskins. He played college football at Northwestern University and was selected 79th overall in the ninth round of the 1966 AFL draft by the Kansas City Chiefs.
