= Dick Leftridge =

American football player (1944–2004)

No. 31
- Position: Fullback

Personal information
- Born: April 14, 1944; Hinton, West Virginia, U.S.
- Died: February 27, 2004 (aged 59); Morgantown, West Virginia, U.S.
- Listed height: 6 ft 2 in (1.88 m)
- Listed weight: 240 lb (109 kg)

Career information
- High school: Hinton (WV)
- College: West Virginia
- NFL draft: 1966: 1st round, 3rd overall pick
- AFL draft: 1966: 4th round, 26th overall pick

Career history
- Pittsburgh Steelers (1966–1967); New Orleans Saints (1967)*; Orlando Panthers 1968*; Hartford Knights 1968*
- * Offseason or practice squad member only

Career NFL statistics
- Rushing yards: 17
- Rushing average: 2.1
- Touchdowns: 2
- Stats at Pro Football Reference

Jack Richard Leftridge (April 14, 1944 – February 27, 2004) was an American professional football player. He played fullback for a single season in the National Football League (NFL) with the Pittsburgh Steelers.

Leftridge was born in Hinton, West Virginia and played college football at West Virginia University (WVU). Along with Roger Alford who entered in the same class, Leftridge was the first African American to play football at WVU.

- 1963: 79 carries for 393 yards and 5 TD. 10 catches for 89 yards and 2 TD.
- 1964: 125 carries for 534 yards and 5 TD. 3 catches for 23 yards.
- 1965: 144 carries for 744 yards and 8 TD. 9 catches for 77 yards and one touchdown.

== Pro Career ==
Leftridge was selected by the Steelers with the third overall selection of the first round of the 1966 NFL draft. He appeared in only four games in 1966 and was cut going into the 1967 for being overweight and not reporting in often enough during the offseason. His selection is considered by some as the worst draft pick in Steelers history.

A few weeks after being cut by the Steelers, he was signed by the Saints but he left camp after only a few days due to his wife's illness and never returned.

On July 2, 1968 he signed with the Orlando Panthers of the Continental Football League. But in September, after a few preseason games, he announced he was retiring from football after being unable to control his weight.

But a few days later he signed with the Hartford Knights of the Atlantic Coast Football League and then quickly disappeared from them too.
