= Taft Reed =

American football player (born 1942)

No. 17, 38, 23, 41
- Position: Defensive back

Personal information
- Born: June 12, 1942 (age 84); Hattiesburg, Mississippi, U.S.
- Listed height: 6 ft 2 in (1.88 m)
- Listed weight: 200 lb (91 kg)

Career information
- High school: Rowan (Hattiesburg)
- College: Jackson State (1962-1965)
- NFL draft: 1966: 19th round, 279th overall pick
- AFL draft: 1966: 9th round, 81st overall pick

Career history
- Wilmington Clippers (1967); Philadelphia Eagles (1967); Charleston Rockets (1968); Jersey Jays (1969); Bridgeport Jets (1970)

Career NFL statistics
- Return yards: 111
- Stats at Pro Football Reference

Taft Reed (born June 12, 1942) is an American former professional football player who was a defensive back for the Philadelphia Eagles of the National Football League (NFL) in 1967. He played college football for the Jackson State Tigers. He was selected by the San Diego Chargers in the ninth round (81st overall) of the 1966 AFL draft and by the Philadelphia Eagles in the 19th round (279th overall) of the 1966 NFL draft.
