= Bob Sherlag =

American football player (born 1943)

No. 82, 44
- Position: Wide receiver

Personal information
- Born: April 19, 1943 (age 83); Chicago, Illinois, U.S.
- Listed height: 6 ft 0 in (1.83 m)
- Listed weight: 195 lb (88 kg)

Career information
- High school: Carl Schurz (Chicago)
- College: Memphis (1962–1965)
- NFL draft: 1966: 6th round, 84th overall pick
- AFL draft: 1966: 5th round, 41st overall pick

Career history
- Atlanta Falcons (1966); Hartford Knights (1968)

Career NFL statistics
- Receptions: 4
- Receiving yards: 53
- Touchdowns: 1
- Stats at Pro Football Reference

Robert Joseph Sherlag (born April 19, 1943) is an American former professional football player who played for Atlanta Falcons of the National Football League (NFL). He played college football at the University of Memphis.
