= Bill Scott (American football) =

American football player (born 1944)

No. 37
- Position: Defensive back

Personal information
- Born: May 18, 1944 (age 82); Washington, D. C., U.S.
- Listed height: 6 ft 0 in (1.83 m)
- Listed weight: 188 lb (85 kg)

Career information
- High school: Laurel
- College: Idaho
- AFL draft: 1966: 16th round, 144th overall pick

Career history
- San Diego Chargers (1966)*; Toronto Argonauts (1966); Cincinnati Bengals (1968)
- * Offseason or practice squad member only
- Stats at Pro Football Reference

William James Scott (born February 23, 1952) is an American former professional football player who was a defensive back for the Cincinnati Bengals of National Football League (NFL). He played college football for the University of Idaho.
