= Scotty Glacken =

American football player and coach (1944–2006)

Profile
- Position: Quarterback

Personal information
- Born: July 28, 1944; Washington, D.C., U.S.
- Died: December 27, 2006 (aged 62); Bethesda, Maryland, U.S.

Career information
- College: Duke
- AFL draft: 1966: 7th round

Career history

Playing
- Denver Broncos (1966–1967)

Coaching
- Georgetown Hoyas (1970–1992)

Awards and highlights
- Second-team All-ACC (1963)

Career statistics
- Passing attempts: 15
- Passing completions: 6
- Completion percentage: 40.0%
- TD–INT: 1–0
- Passing yards: 84
- Passer rating: 81
- Stats at Pro Football Reference

Edward Scott Glacken (July 28, 1944 – December 27, 2006) was an American football quarterback and coach. He played college football at Duke University. In 1963, Glacken threw for a school-record 12 touchdown passes. Glacken finished his Duke career with 3,170 yards and 24 touchdowns, helping the Blue Devils to a 15–13–2 record during his final three years as a player.

Glacken played two seasons with the Denver Broncos, leading them to a 1967 exhibition victory over the Detroit Lions, the first time an American Football League (AFL) club defeated a team from the rival National Football League (NFL).

Glacken would begin a two-decade long coaching career in 1970, taking the head coaching position at Georgetown University in Washington, D.C., helping to return the Hoyas to NCAA intercollegiate competition after a number of years as a club team.

Glacken retired as Georgetown's coach in 1992, having compiled a 98–94–2 record.

== See also ==
- List of American Football League players
