= Steve Chomyszak =

American football player (1944–1988)

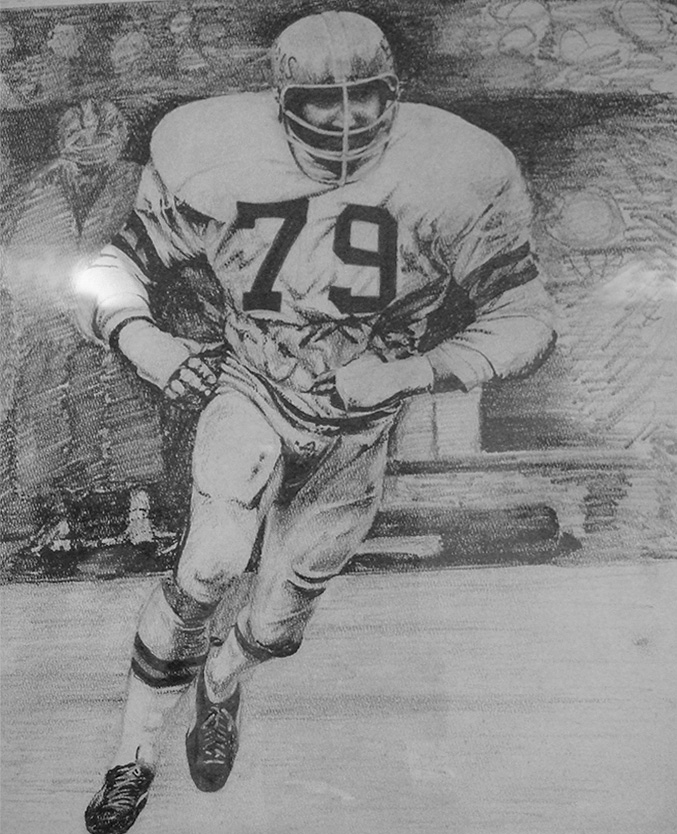

No. 77, 79
- Positions: Defensive tackle, defensive end

Personal information
- Born: February 27, 1944; Gerbrunn, Germany
- Died: January 25, 1988 (aged 43); Binghamton, New York, U.S.
- Listed height: 6 ft 6 in (1.98 m)
- Listed weight: 270 lb (122 kg)

Career information
- College: Syracuse
- AFL draft: 1966: 12th round, 103rd overall pick

Career history
- New York Jets (1966–1967); Cincinnati Bengals (1968–1973, 1974)

Career statistics
- Games played: 79
- Games started: 0
- Fumble recoveries: 3
- Stats at Pro Football Reference

Stephen John Chomyszak (February 27, 1944 – January 25, 1988) was an American football defensive lineman in the American Football League (AFL) and the National Football League (NFL). A defensive tackle, he played for the AFL's New York Jets (1966–1967) and Cincinnati Bengals (1968–1973) of the AFL and NFL.

He attended Syracuse University and was drafted in the 12th round (103rd overall) of the 1966 AFL draft by the New York Jets, playing in two games that season and spending most of the season on the taxi squad. The following season, he saw no action due to a serious ankle injury.

He signed with the expansion Cincinnati Bengals for the 1968 season, playing in 10 games. He finally came into his own beginning in the 1969 season, playing all 14 games as a defensive end for the Bengals.

Switched to defensive tackle, Chomyszak became a starter in every now-NFL Bengals games of both the 1970 and 1971 seasons, and in 1972 starting 10 of his 13 games. In 1973, he played in 12 games, starting three.

On March 18, 1974, the fledgling World Football League (WFL) held its first "Pro Draft" of players from the NFL and Canadian Football League (CFL). The Philadelphia Bell chose the WFL rights to Chomyszak in the 11th round (123rd overall). On April 9, 1974, while still with the Bengals, Chomyszak signed a long-term contract that would take effect after the conclusion of the Bengals' season with the Philadelphia Bell. This incensed Bengals coach and general manager Paul Brown who, on July 31, 1974, traded Chomyszak to the Buffalo Bills. However, Chomyszak saw no action with the Bills and was cut by the team early in the season. He then played out the season in the soon-to-be-defunct WFL.

Chomyszak had broken his contract with the Bell and became a free agent in 1974. He received offers from several NFL teams but chose to return to the Bengals. But Brown waived him late in the preseason on August 26, 1975, leaving him without a team. He claimed that Brown had essentially blackballed him from the NFL.

During the 1975 season he was out of football, selling insurance.

In 1976, he signed with the expansion Tampa Bay Buccaneers, but was later waived.

Chomyszak was married to Debra Jerene Nichols On Jul 18 1980, Chomyszak divorced Nichols and later married Pamela Long.

While living in Florence, Kentucky (near Cincinnati), he was diagnosed with pancreatic cancer in 1987. He died on January 25, 1988, at his parents' home in Binghamton, New York. Steve adopted Pam's son Bryan, from a previous marriage. Together they had a daughter, Amy Lura, and a son, Richard. His son, Richard Chomyszak, is a chiropractor in Binghamton.
