= George Chesser =

American football player (1942–2008)

No. 28, 31
- Positions: Running back, Punter

Personal information
- Born: September 11, 1942; Starkville, Mississippi, U.S.
- Died: November 12, 2008 (aged 66); Starkville, Mississippi, U.S.
- Listed height: 6 ft 2 in (1.88 m)
- Listed weight: 220 lb (100 kg)

Career information
- High school: Starkville (MS)
- College: Mississippi (1961); Delta State (1963-1965)
- NFL draft: 1966: undrafted

Career history
- Miami Dolphins (1966-1967)

Career AFL statistics
- Rushing yards: 77
- Rushing average: 4.3
- Receptions: 1
- Receiving yards: 4
- Stats at Pro Football Reference

George Allen Chesser (September 11, 1942 – November 12, 2008) was an American professional football running back and punter. He played for the Miami Dolphins from 1966 to 1967.
