= Jim Boudreaux =

American football player (born 1944)

No. 78, 64, 74
- Positions: Tackle, Defensive end

Personal information
- Born: October 11, 1944 (age 82); Ville Platte, Louisiana, U.S.
- Listed height: 6 ft 4 in (1.93 m)
- Listed weight: 260 lb (118 kg)

Career information
- High school: Plaquemine (LA)
- College: Louisiana Tech (1962-1965)
- NFL draft: 1966: 13th round, 199th overall pick
- AFL draft: 1966: 2nd round, 10th overall pick

Career history
- Boston Patriots (1966-1968); Las Vegas Cowboys (1969)

Career AFL statistics
- Games played: 12
- Fumble recoveries: 1
- Stats at Pro Football Reference

Jim Boudreaux (born October 11, 1944) is an American former professional football player who was a tackle and defensive end for the Boston Patriots of the American Football League (AFL) from 1966 to 1968. He played college football for the Louisiana Tech Bulldogs.
