= Fletcher Smith (American football) =

American football player (born 1943)

No. 17, 31
- Position: Safety

Personal information
- Born: October 13, 1943 (age 83); Hearne, Texas, U.S.

Career information
- College: Tennessee State
- AFL draft: 1966: 8th round, 69th overall pick

Career history
- Kansas City Chiefs (1966–1967); Cincinnati Bengals (1968–1971); Jacksonville Express (1975)

Career statistics
- Interceptions: 15
- Interception yards: 250
- Stats at Pro Football Reference

Fletcher Leon Smith (born October 10,1943) is an American former professional football player who was a safety in the American Football League (AFL) and National Football League (NFL). He was selected by the Kansas City Chiefs in the sixth round of the 1966 AFL draft. He played college football for the Tennessee State Tigers. Smith also played for the Cincinnati Bengals and the Jacksonville Express of the World Football League (WFL).
