= Trusse Norris =

American football player (born 1937)

No. 44
- Position: End

Personal information
- Born: August 10, 1937 (age 89); Houston, Texas, U.S.
- Listed height: 6 ft 1 in (1.85 m)
- Listed weight: 194 lb (88 kg)

Career information
- High school: Wheatley (Houston)
- College: UCLA

Career history
- Los Angeles Chargers (1960)
- Stats at Pro Football Reference

Trusse Rupert Brown Norris (born August 10, 1937) is an American former professional football player who played one season as an end with the Los Angeles Chargers of the American Football League (AFL). He played college football for the UCLA Bruins.
