= Benny Russell =

American football player (1944–1999)

No. 3
- Position: Quarterback

Personal information
- Born: May 12, 1944; Brewton, Alabama, U.S.
- Died: December 15, 1999 (aged 55); Pensacola, Florida, U.S.
- Listed height: 6 ft 1 in (1.85 m)
- Listed weight: 190 lb (86 kg)

Career information
- High school: Jay (FL)
- College: Louisville (1964-1966)
- NFL draft: 1966: 17th round, 252nd overall pick
- AFL draft: 1966: Red Shirt 11th round, 99th overall pick

Career history
- Buffalo Bills (1968); Hartford Knights (1969-1970)

Career AFL statistics
- TD–INT: 0–0
- Passing yards: 3
- Stats at Pro Football Reference

Bennett Coe Russell (May 12, 1944 – December 15, 1999) was an American professional football player who was a quarterback for one game in the American Football League (AFL) for the Buffalo Bills. He played college football for the Louisville Cardinals.
