= S. T. Saffold =

American football player (born 1944)

No. 27
- Position: Split end

Personal information
- Born: May 18, 1944 (age 82); Slater, Mississippi, U.S.
- Listed height: 6 ft 4 in (1.93 m)
- Listed weight: 202 lb (92 kg)

Career information
- High school: Edison (Stockton, California)
- College: San Jose State
- NFL draft: 1966: 15th round, 222nd overall pick
- AFL draft: 1966: Red Shirt 7th round, 62nd overall pick

Career history
- San Diego Chargers (1967)*; Cincinnati Bengals (1968)
- * Offseason or practice squad member only

Career AFL statistics
- Receptions: 16
- Receiving yards: 172
- Stats at Pro Football Reference

Saint Samuel Saffold (born May 18, 1944) is an American former professional football player who was a split end for one season with the Cincinnati Bengals of the American Football League (AFL). He played college basketball and football for the San Jose State Spartans.

== Early life ==
Saint Samuel Saffold was born on May 18, 1944, in Slater, Mississippi. In regards to his name, Saffold stated, "I come from a very religious family of 11 children and all four of my brothers have biblical names." He played three sports at Edison High School in Stockton, California.

== College career ==
Saffold played college basketball for the San Jose State Spartans of San Jose State College as a forward. He was on the freshman team in 1962–63 and the varsity team from 1963–64 to 1965–66. He played in 22 games during the 1963–64 season, averaging 10.7 points and 9.4 rebounds per game while earning second-team All-West Coast Athletic Conference (WCAC) honors. Saffold appeared in 24 games in 1964–65 and recorded averages of 15.8 points and 9.4 rebounds per game, garnering first-team All-WCAC recognition. He played in 24 games for the second straight year in 1965–66 and averaged a double-double with 17.4 points and 10.5 rebounds per game. He was also named first-team All-WCAC for the 1965–66 season.

Saffold played one season of college football for the Spartans in 1966, catching 30 passes for 420 yards and four touchdowns. He was later inducted into San Jose State's athletics hall of fame.

== Professional career ==
Saffold was selected by the San Diego Chargers in the seventh round, with the 62nd overall pick, of the 1966 AFL Redshirt Draft and by the San Francisco 49ers in the 15th round, with the 222nd overall pick, of the 1966 NFL draft. He signed with the Chargers in 1967 and spent the 1967 season on the team's taxi squad.

Saffold signed with the Cincinnati Bengals in 1968. He played in all 14 games, starting seven, for the Bengals during the team's inaugural 1968 season, catching 16 passes for 172 yards while also rushing once for 21 yards. On July 23, 1969, it was reported that Saffold was quitting pro football to try out for the San Francisco Warriors of the National Basketball Association.
