= George Allen (defensive tackle) =

American football player (1944–1987)

No. 73, 62
- Position: Defensive tackle

Personal information
- Born: April 4, 1944; Longview, Texas, U.S.
- Died: May 2, 1987 (aged 43); Sacramento, California, U.S.
- Listed height: 6 ft 7 in (2.01 m)
- Listed weight: 270 lb (122 kg)

Career information
- High school: Mary C. Womack (TX)
- College: West Texas State (1962-1965)
- NFL draft: 1966: 17th round, 250th overall pick
- AFL draft: 1966: 4th round, 28th overall pick

Career history
- Houston Oilers (1966–1967); Oakland Raiders (1968)*; Sacramento Capitols (1968)
- * Offseason or practice squad member only

Career AFL statistics
- Games played: 9
- Stats at Pro Football Reference

George Robert Allen (April 4, 1944 – May 2, 1987) was an American professional football player who was a defensive tackle in the American Football League (AFL) for the Houston Oilers. He played college football for the West Texas A&M Buffaloes.

== Early life ==
Allen attended Mary C. Womack High School. He accepted a football scholarship from West Texas State University.

== Professional career ==
Allen was selected by the Houston Oilers in the fourth round (28th overall) of the 1966 AFL draft. He was also selected by the Dallas Cowboys in the 17th round (250th overall) of the 1966 NFL draft. He chose to sign with the Oilers in the American Football League.

As a rookie, he played in 9 games at offensive tackle. In 1967, he was converted into a defensive tackle during training camp. He spent the year on the taxi squad.

On July 28, 1968, he was traded to the Oakland Raiders in exchange for a future draft choice (not exercised). He was released before the start of the season.
