= Claude Brownlee =

American football player (born 1944)

No. 77, 79, 75
- Position: Defensive tackle

Personal information
- Born: April 8, 1944 (age 82); Columbus, Georgia, U.S.
- Listed height: 6 ft 4 in (1.93 m)
- Listed weight: 265 lb (120 kg)

Career information
- High school: Spencer (Columbus)
- College: Benedictine (1962–1965)
- NFL draft: 1966: 10th round, 155th overall pick

Career history
- Harrisburg Capitols (1966); Miami Dolphins (1967); Alabama Hawks (1968); Roanoke Buckskins (1969)

Career AFL statistics
- Games played: 3
- Stats at Pro Football Reference

Claude Brownlee (born April 8, 1944) is an American former professional football player who was a defensive tackle for the Miami Dolphins of the National Football League (NFL) in 1967. He played college football for the Benedictine Ravens.
