= Nick DeFelice =

American football player (born 1940)

No. 71
- Position: Tackle

Personal information
- Born: February 4, 1940 (age 86); Derby, Connecticut
- Listed height: 6 ft 3 in (1.91 m)
- Listed weight: 250 lb (113 kg)

Career information
- High school: Derby (CT)
- College: Southern Connecticut State

Career history
- New York Jets (1965)
- Stats at Pro Football Reference

Nicholas Francis DeFelice (born February 4, 1940) is an American former football tackle. He played for the New York Jets in 1965.
