= Bill Darnall =

American football player (born 1944)

No. 42
- Position: Wide receiver

Personal information
- Born: April 21, 1944 (age 82); Washington, D.C.
- Listed height: 6 ft 2 in (1.88 m)
- Listed weight: 197 lb (89 kg)

Career information
- College: North Carolina
- NFL draft: 1966: 6th round

Career history
- Miami Dolphins (1968-1969)
- Stats at Pro Football Reference

William Carlyle Darnall (born April 21, 1944) is an American former football wide receiver who played in the National Football League (NFL) for two seasons for the Miami Dolphins. Darnall appeared in 13 career games.
