= Tom Cichowski =

American football player (1944–2015)

No. 78
- Position: Offensive tackle

Personal information
- Born: June 13, 1944; New Britain, Connecticut, U.S.
- Died: September 17, 2015 (aged 71); Kalispell, Montana, U.S.
- Listed height: 6 ft 4 in (1.93 m)
- Listed weight: 250 lb (113 kg)

Career information
- High school: Southington (Southington, Connecticut)
- College: Maryland (1962-1965)
- NFL draft: 1966: 2nd round, 30th overall pick
- AFL draft: 1966: Red Shirt 2nd round, 16th overall pick

Career history
- Denver Broncos (1967–1968)

Career AFL statistics
- Games played: 13
- Games started: 9
- Stats at Pro Football Reference

Tom Cichowski (June 13, 1944 – September 17, 2015) was an American professional football player.

== Biography ==
Cichowski was born Thomas John Cichowski in New Britain, Connecticut and raised in Southington, Connecticut

He graduated from Southington High School in 1962 and subsequently entered the University of Maryland, College Park, on a full scholarship.

From the time he was a high school freshman, he began to make a name for himself as a disciplined, competitive three-sport athlete. At 6’4,” weighing in at 230 pounds, he was a force to be reckoned with in basketball and track, where he once held the shot put record. But it was his artistry on the football field that got him noticed by college and pro scouts. Before he was discovered by them though, he was being groomed in the empire of head coach Dan Sekanovich and Joseph Orsene, who succeeded him in 1961, Cichowski's senior year. The 18-year-old had been a trusted starting tackle until his senior year rolled around. Before the season began, he convinced Orsene to make him a starting fullback, something Sekanovich had also suggested to the new coach before he departed to join the staff of Susquehanna University.

As in his junior year, Cichowski would be a post-season All-State selection. Then it was on to his final season playing basketball as one of five starting seniors.

Naturally, Cichowski's dominance and reliability on the football field caught the eye of colleges from around the country. As he weighed his options in continuing his education, he was courted by the likes of Syracuse, Tennessee and Texas A&M. But his preference was the University of Maryland, College Park, with a football scholarship and the chance to suit up as a Terrapin under coach Tom Nugent.

== College ==
Cichowski did not disappoint in college. He would come to be rated as one of the league's best linemen in his role as an offensive tackle. In his sophomore year, troubles with his scholastic efforts would sideline him from the field and the classroom. He was one of seven football players who had to sit out the 1963–64 season due to failing grades. Cichowski came home and committed himself to studying and getting readmitted to the university. He was allowed to return to school in the fall of 1964 and once his grade point average rose, was no longer on probation with the football team. He returned to play as a junior tackle. In his junior year, with his grades steady and another football season already underway, the skills Cichowski had been nurturing since his days at SHS were recognized when he was selected by the Green Bay Packers as a future in the second round of the 1966 NFL draft. A year later, not long before the 1966 draft, Cichowski was wooed by Green Bay, and legendary coach Vince Lombardi in particular, with the red carpet treatment that included watching from the bench as the team clinched the NFL Western Conference title. In December, just months shy of graduation, the Packers drafted him in the second round for a “substantial” bonus. The Oakland Raiders were also knocking at his door in an early round of the draft, but he jumped at the opportunity to play for Lombardi.

== Career ==
Cichowski, at age 23, reported to training camp in the summer of 1967 and almost as quickly as it began, it was over. In early September, Lombardi was looking to finalize his roster of 40 men. Cichowski was out, among the last cut from the team.

Enter Lou Saban, Cichowski's old coach at Maryland. Saban was a former college coach whose career in the pros began in 1960 with the birth of the old American Football League when he piloted the former Boston Patriots. A one-time college and pro football player himself, he had left the AFL and took a job as head coach at Maryland in Cichowski's senior year. The next year, he left to become the coach and general manager of the Denver Broncos. So when he saw his former player's name on the waiver list, he called Cichowski's father in Southington. He wanted the former Blue Knight to come play for him in Denver. Within three days of being dumped by Green Bay, he was on the fast track to getting himself in a Broncos jersey. By the end of the month he and his wife were putting down roots in Colorado.

One of 26 rookies, Cichowski, wearing No. 78, played in 13 games and would be considered the No. 1 offensive tackle of the 1967–68 season. Entering his second season, Saban looked to him to continue directing blocking assignments on offense. “He’s our traffic policeman,” Saban quipped to a reporter.

Not long after, he was clipped on an otherwise ordinary punt return and had to sit out 12 games with ligament damage and a torn Achilles tendon. Denver later cut him, signaling the end of his career in professional football.

== Post-Career ==
Cichowski found success in the building contractor business and lived with his family in the Denver area until moving to Montana in 1976. He was a member of the first class inducted into the Southington High School Sports Hall of Fame in 2010.

== Death ==
He died at his home in Kalispell, Montana on Sept. 17, 2015. He was 71 years old and survived by his wife of 50 years, two sons and three siblings.
