= Jim Waskiewicz =

American football player (born 1944)

No. 54, 59
- Positions: Linebacker, Center

Personal information
- Born: February 10, 1944 (age 82); Milwaukee, Wisconsin, U.S.

Career information
- College: Wichita State
- AFL draft: 1966: 4th round, 29th overall pick

Career history
- New York Jets (1966–1967); Cincinnati Bengals (1968)*; Atlanta Falcons (1969)
- * Offseason or practice squad member only

Career statistics
- Games played: 39
- Games started: 0
- Fumble recoveries: 2
- Stats at Pro Football Reference

James Allen Waskiewicz (born February 10, 1944) is an American former professional football player who was a linebacker and center in the American Football League (AFL) and the National Football League (NFL). He played college football for the Wichita State Shockers. A fourth-round selection (29th overall pick) of the 1966 AFL draft, Waskiewicz played for the AFL's New York Jets (1966–1967) and the NFL's Atlanta Falcons (1969).
