= Ron Berger =

American football player (born 1942)

No. 72, 88
- Positions: Defensive end, Defensive tackle

Personal information
- Born: September 30, 1942 (age 84); Detroit, Michigan, U.S.
- Listed height: 6 ft 8 in (2.03 m)
- Listed weight: 290 lb (132 kg)

Career information
- High school: Denby (Detroit)
- College: Wayne St. (Michigan) (1962-1965)
- NFL draft: 1966: undrafted

Career history
- Miami Dolphins (1966)*; Orange County Ramblers (1967); St. Louis Cardinals (1968)*; Orange County Ramblers (1968); Los Angeles Rams (1969)*; Boston/New England Patriots (1969–1972); Buffalo Bills (1973)*; Miami Dolphins (1973)
- * Offseason or practice squad member only

Career NFL/AFL statistics
- Fumble recoveries: 3
- Sacks: 14
- Stats at Pro Football Reference

Ron Berger (born September 30, 1942) is an American former college and professional football player. A defensive end, he played college football at Wayne State University, and played professionally in the American Football League (AFL) and National Football League (NFL) for the Boston/New England Patriots.

== Career ==
Berger began his career with a semi-pro team in Pontiac, Michigan, in 1965 with the St. Petersburg Blazers of the North American Football League. The next year, the 6-foot-8 Berger played for the Orange County (Calif.) Ramblers of the Continental Football League before signing with the NFL's Los Angeles Rams. He joined the Patriots as a free agent in 1969 as the biggest lineman to ever suit up for the team.

Burger played in 41 games for the Boston/New England Patriots. His final season was with the Miami Dolphins in 1973.
