= Bob Petrella =

American football player (born 1944)

No. 48
- Position: Defensive back

Personal information
- Born: November 7, 1944 (age 81); Philadelphia, Pennsylvania, U.S.
- Listed height: 5 ft 11 in (1.80 m)
- Listed weight: 190 lb (86 kg)

Career information
- High school: South Philadelphia
- College: Tennessee (1962-1965)
- NFL draft: 1966: 12th round, 181st overall pick
- AFL draft: 1966: 8th round, 64th overall pick

Career history
- Miami Dolphins (1966–1971)

Career NFL/AFL statistics
- Interceptions: 5
- Fumble recoveries: 5
- Stats at Pro Football Reference

Robert Francis Petrella (born November 7, 1944) is an American former professional football player who was a defensive back for the Miami Dolphins of the American Football League (AFL) and National Football League (NFL). He played college football for the Tennessee Volunteers. He was selected by the Minnesota Vikings in the 12th round of the 1966 NFL draft with the 181st overall pick. In addition, he was selected by the Dolphins in the eighth round of the 1966 NFL draft with the 64th overall pick. He was on Miami's roster for their inaugural season in 1966. Petrella played in six seasons for the Dolphins, recording five interceptions.

Petrella’s memory is one of fewer than 100 known cases of hyperthymesia.
