= Stan Quintana =

American football player (1944–2019)

No. 17 – New Mexico Lobos
- Positions: Quarterback, defensive back

Personal information
- Born: December 23, 1944; Santa Fe, New Mexico, U.S.
- Died: September 21, 2019 (aged 74); Florida, U.S.
- Listed height: 6 ft 0 in (1.83 m)
- Listed weight: 176 lb (80 kg)

Career information
- High school: Santa Fe
- College: New Mexico (1963–1965); Minnesota Vikings (1966–1967); Quantico Marines (1969–1970)

Awards and highlights
- WAC Player of the Year (1964)

Stanley A. Quintana (December 23, 1944 – September 21, 2019) was an American football quarterback and defensive back. He played for the New Mexico Lobos from 1963 to 1965 and the Quantico Marines in 1969 and 1970. He was a member of the Minnesota Vikings taxi squad in 1966 and the traveling squad in 1967. He was selected as the Western Athletic Conference Player of the Year in 1964.

== Early life ==
Quintana grew up in Santa Fe, New Mexico, and attended Santa Fe High School. He was a multi-sport athlete in high school, earning all-state honors in football, averaging more than 23 points per game in basketball, and batting almost .400 in baseball.

== University of New Mexico ==
Quintana attended the University of New Mexico on a football scholarship starting in the fall of 1962. After playing on the freshman team in 1962, he played at quarterback and defensive back for the New Mexico Lobos football team from 1963 to 1965. He led the team to consecutive Western Athletic Conference (WAC) championships in 1963 and 1964.

As a junior, he led the 1964 New Mexico team to a 9–2 record and a No. 16 ranking in the UPI poll. During the 1964 season, he ranked third in the WAC with 1,249 yards of total offense, fourth with 749 passing yards, and fifth with 455 rushing yards (including an 80-yard run against Colorado State). He also set a WAC record for interception return yards (including a 93-yard return against Wyoming), and his average of 7.3 yard of total offense per play in 1964 remains a New Mexico school record. The United Press International selected him as the 1964 WAC Player of the Year, citing his versatility and outstanding play on both offense and defense.

After his senior season, he played in three all-star games: the East–West Shrine Game in San Francisco, the Senior Bowl in Mobile, Alabama, and the Chicago College All-Star Game.

In three seasons at New Mexico, Quintana set 12 New Mexico and five WAC records. He completed 89 of 214 passes for 1,459 yards and four touchdowns with 12 interceptions. He also rushed for 1,207 yards and eight touchdowns on 247 carries.

== Later life ==
After graduating from the University of New Mexico, Quintana was selected by the Minnesota Vikings with the 162nd pick in the 1966 NFL draft. He spent the 1966 season on the Vikings' taxi squad. He made the Vikings' traveling squad in 1967 but did not see action in any regular season games.

In April 1969, Quintana joined the United States Marine Corps. He played at free safety and backup quarterback for the Quantico Marines football team in 1969 and 1970. Following the 1970 football season, he served as an assistant platoon commander in Vietnam with the 2nd Combined Action Group, 3d Marine Amphibious Brigade. He was discharged from the Marines in 1972.

After leaving the Marine Corps, Quintana received a bachelor's degree from the University of Texas at El Paso. He married Rosella Martinez of Santa Fe, and they had three children: Wendy, Allen, and Shari. Quintana later worked as a high school football coach in El Paso and San Antonio, Texas, and as the receivers coach for the New Mexico Lobos from 1981 to 1986. Quintana was the first Hispanic football coach at the University of New Mexico. In December 1986, New Mexico fired head coach Joe Lee Dunn, and all 10 assistant coaches were also told to look for other work. In 1987, he returned to coaching high school football in El Paso.

In 2003, he was inducted into both the UNM Alumni Athletic Hall of Honor and the Albuquerque Sports Hall of Fame (later renamed the New Mexico Sports Hall of Fame). In 2018, The Santa Fe New Mexican selected the 10 best athletes in the city's history, picking Quintana at the No. 4 spot.

Quintana died in September 2019 in Florida and was buried at the Santa Fe National Cemetery.
