= Wayne DeSutter =

American football player (1944–2025)

No. 71
- Position: Offensive tackle

Personal information
- Born: May 17, 1944; Geneseo, Illinois, U.S.
- Died: June 8, 2025 (aged 81); Columbus, Ohio, U.S.
- Listed height: 6 ft 4 in (1.93 m)
- Listed weight: 255 lb (116 kg)

Career information
- High school: Atkinson (Atkinson, Illinois)
- College: Illinois (1962); Western Illinois (1963–1965)
- NFL draft: 1966: 6th round, 87th overall pick
- AFL draft: 1966: 12th round, 109th overall pick

Career history
- Buffalo Bills (1966)

Career AFL statistics
- Games played: 14
- Stats at Pro Football Reference

Wayne DeSutter (May 17, 1944 – June 8, 2025) was an American professional football player who was a tackle for the Buffalo Bills of the American Football League (AFL) in 1966.

== Biography ==
DeSutter played college football for the Western Illinois Leathernecks. He was inducted into the WIU Athletics Hall of Fame in 1986.

DeSutter was selected in the sixth round of the 1966 NFL draft by the Detroit Lions. He chose to play for the Bills, who picked him in the 12th round of the AFL draft.

Following his one season in the AFL, DeSutter served in the Illinois National Guard. Starting in 1970, he began a 34-year career in education as a teacher, athletic director and football coach. He was inducted into the Illinois High School Football Coaches Association Hall of Fame in 1993.

DeSutter was the coach at Plainfield High School in 1990 and had just called afternoon practice when five minutes later with the players huddled inside an F5 tornado ripped through the high school on August 28, 1990. DeSutter was inducted into the inaugural class of the school's Athletic Hall of Fame in 2018.

DeSutter died in Columbus, Ohio on June 8, 2025, at the age of 81.
