= Ed Weisacosky =

American football player (1944–2019)

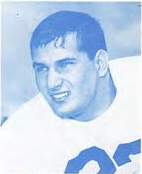
- Weisacosky in 1965

No. 51, 66
- Position: Linebacker

Personal information
- Born: May 4, 1944; Pottsville, Pennsylvania, U.S.
- Died: November 24, 2019 (aged 75); Mount Vernon, Missouri, U.S.
- Listed height: 6 ft 1 in (1.85 m)
- Listed weight: 230 lb (104 kg)

Career information
- High school: Pottsville
- College: Miami (FL)
- AFL draft: 1966: 6th round, 42nd overall pick

Career history
- New York Giants (1967); Miami Dolphins (1968–1970); New England Patriots (1971–1972)

Awards and highlights
- First-team All-American (1965)

Career statistics
- Interceptions: 3
- Fumble recoveries: 3
- Games played: 67
- Stats at Pro Football Reference

Edward Leo Weisacosky (May 4, 1944 – November 24, 2019) was an American professional football player who was a linebacker in the American Football League (AFL) and National Football League (NFL). He played college football for the Miami Hurricanes and was selected 42nd overall by the Miami Dolphins in the sixth round of the 1966 AFL draft.

Weisacosky also played for the New York Giants and New England Patriots.
