= Mike London (linebacker) =

American football player (born 1955)

Michael David London is an American former professional football player who was a linebacker for the San Diego Chargers of the American Football League (AFL). He played college football for the Wisconsin Badgers.

== Biography ==
Michael David London was born on December 31, 1944, in Madison, Wisconsin.

== Career ==
London was selected in the fourteenth round of the 1966 AFL draft by the San Diego Chargers and played that season with the team. He played at the collegiate level at the University of Wisconsin–Madison.
