= Henry Sorrell =

American football player (1943–2025)

Profile
- Position: Linebacker

Personal information
- Born: June 10, 1943; Talladega, Alabama, U.S.
- Died: October 18, 2025 (aged 82); Talladega, Alabama, U.S.
- Listed height: 6 ft 0 in (1.83 m)
- Listed weight: 246 lb (112 kg)

Career information
- High school: Talladega
- College: Chattanooga
- AFL draft: 1966: Red Shirt 8th round, 66th overall pick

Career history
- 1967: Denver Broncos
- 1968: Alabama Hawks
- 1969–1970: Hamilton Tiger-Cats
- 1971: BC Lions

Awards and highlights
- CFL East All-Star (1969)
- Stats at Pro Football Reference

Henry Thomas Sorrell (June 10, 1943 – October 18, 2025) was an American professional football player who was a linebacker in the National Football League (NFL) and Canadian Football League (CFL). He played college football for the Chattanooga Mocs. Sorrell played in the NFL for the Denver Broncos and in the CFL with the Hamilton Tiger-Cats and BC Lions.

Sorrell died in Talladega, Alabama, on October 18, 2025, at the age of 82.
