= Fran Morelli =

American football player (1939–2008)

No. 79
- Position: Tackle

Personal information
- Born: January 15, 1939; Medford, Massachusetts
- Died: September 10, 2008 (aged 69); New Jersey
- Listed height: 6 ft 2 in (1.88 m)
- Listed weight: 258 lb (117 kg)

Career information
- High school: Medford (MA); DeWitt (NY) The Manlius School
- College: Colgate

Career history
- New York Titans (1961)
- Stats at Pro Football Reference

Fran Morelli (January 15, 1939 – September 10, 2008) was an American football tackle. He played for the New York Titans in 1961.

He died on September 10, 2008, in New Jersey at age 69.
