= Doug Satcher =

American football player (born 1945)

No. 58
- Position: Linebacker

Personal information
- Born: May 28, 1945 (age 81); Sandersville, Mississippi, U.S.
- Listed height: 6 ft 0 in (1.83 m)
- Listed weight: 220 lb (100 kg)

Career information
- College: Southern Miss
- AFL draft: 1966: 9th round, 75th overall pick

Career history
- 1966–1968: Boston Patriots

Career statistics
- Games played: 42
- Games started: 12
- Stats at Pro Football Reference

Doug Satcher (born May 28, 1945) is an American former professional football player who was a linebacker for three seasons with the Boston Patriots of the American Football League (AFL). He played college football for the Southern Miss Golden Eagles.
