= Jim LeClair (quarterback) =

American football player (born 1944)

No. 16, 10, 11
- Position: Quarterback

Personal information
- Born: March 23, 1944 (age 82); Mount Vernon, New York, U.S.
- Listed height: 6 ft 1 in (1.85 m)
- Listed weight: 200 lb (91 kg)

Career information
- High school: Archbishop Molloy (New York, New York)
- College: C.W. Post (1962-1965)
- NFL draft: 1966: 16th round, 241st overall pick

Career history
- San Francisco 49ers (1966)*; Waterbury Orbits (1966); Montreal Beavers (1966); Denver Broncos (1967-1968); Westchester Bulls (1968); Long Island Bulls (1969); Montreal Alouettes (1971)
- * Offseason or practice squad member only

Career AFL statistics
- Passing attempts: 99
- Passing completions: 46
- Completion percentage: 46.5%
- TD–INT: 2–6
- Passing yards: 676
- Passer rating: 50.7
- Stats at Pro Football Reference

James Michael LeClair (born March 23, 1944) is an American former professional football quarterback who played for the Denver Broncos in the American Football League (AFL) and college football for the C.W. Post Sharks.
