= 1966 NFL draft =

National Football League draft

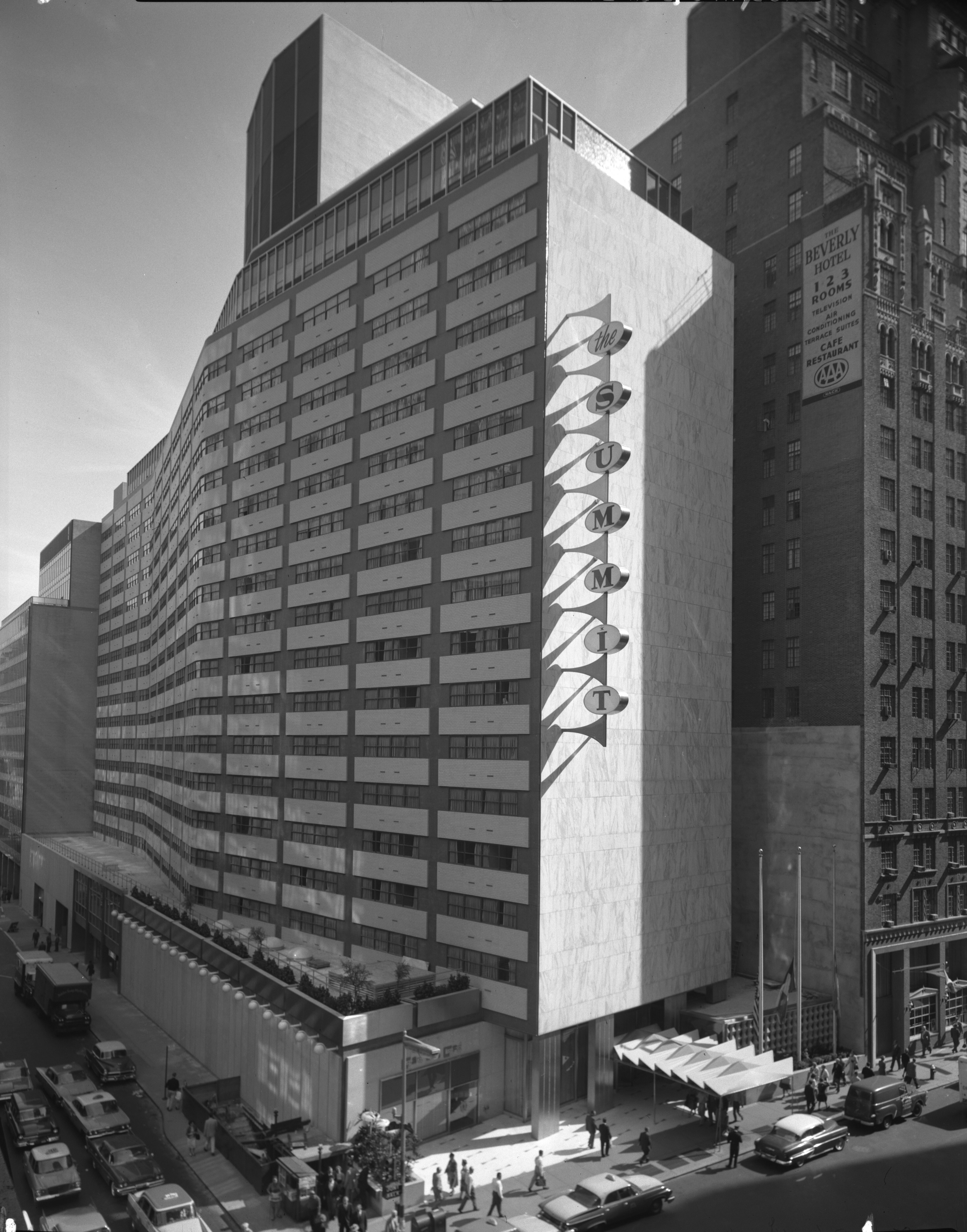
- The Summit Hotel (draft location), photographed in 1961

General information
- Date: November 27, 1965
- Time: 8:58 am EST
- Location: Summit Hotel in New York City

Overview
- 305 total selections in 20 rounds
- League: NFL
- First selection: Tommy Nobis, LB; Atlanta Falcons
- Most selections (25): Atlanta Falcons
- Fewest selections (15): Pittsburgh Steelers
- Hall of Famers: 2: OT Tom Mack; CB Emmitt Thomas

The 1966 NFL draft was held at the Summit Hotel in New York City on Saturday, November 27, 1965.

The expansion Atlanta Falcons were awarded the first pick in each round as well as the final pick in each of the first five rounds. The first overall selection was Tommy Nobis, a linebacker from Texas. The league also provided the Falcons with an expansion draft six weeks later.

This was the last draft in which the NFL and the AFL selected their players separate of one another. As a result, most players drafted by teams from both leagues chose to play for the more established NFL, but not all. Similar to 1965, the AFL draft was held on the same day. After the merger agreement in June 1966, a common draft was held in March 1967.

== Player selections ==
= Pro Bowler	= AFL All-Star	= Hall of Famer

=== Round 1 ===
Pick #	NFL team	Player	Position	College
1	Atlanta Falcons	Tommy Nobis	Linebacker	Texas
2	Los Angeles Rams	Tom Mack	Offensive tackle	Michigan
3	Pittsburgh Steelers	Dick Leftridge	Running back	West Virginia
4	Philadelphia Eagles	Randy Beisler	Defensive end	Indiana
5	Dallas Cowboys	John Niland	Offensive guard	Iowa
6	Washington Redskins	Charlie Gogolak	Kicker	Princeton
7	Minnesota Vikings	Jerry Shay	Offensive tackle	Purdue
8	St. Louis Cardinals	Carl McAdams	Linebacker	Oklahoma
9	Green Bay Packers	Jim Grabowski	Running back	Illinois
10	New York Giants	Francis Peay	Offensive tackle	Missouri
11	San Francisco 49ers	Stan Hindman	Defensive end	Ole 'Miss
12	Chicago Bears	George Rice	Offensive tackle	LSU
13	Green Bay Packers	Gale Gillingham	Guard	Minnesota
14	Cleveland Browns	Milt Morin	Tight end	UMass
15	Baltimore Colts	Sam Ball	Offensive tackle	Kentucky
16	Atlanta Falcons	Randy Johnson	Quarterback	Texas A&I

- ^{HOF} Member of the Professional Football Hall of Fame

=== Round 2 ===
Pick #	NFL team	Player	Position	College
17	Atlanta Falcons	Nick Rassas	Safety	Notre Dame
18	Los Angeles Rams	Mike Garrett	Running back	USC
19	Pittsburgh Steelers	Larry Gagner	Guard	Florida
20	Philadelphia Eagles	Gary Pettigrew	Defensive end	Stanford
21	Washington Redskins	Walter Barnes	Tackle	Nebraska
22	Dallas Cowboys	Willie Townes	Tackle	Tulsa
23	St. Louis Cardinals	Harold Lucas	Tackle	Michigan State
24	Detroit Lions	Nick Eddy	Running back	Notre Dame
25	New York Giants	Don Davis	Tackle	Cal State-Los Angeles
26	San Francisco 49ers	Bob Windsor	Tight end	Kentucky
27	Minnesota Vikings	Jim Lindsey	Running back	Arkansas
28	Chicago Bears	Charlie Brown	Defensive back	Syracuse
29	Cleveland Browns	Rick Norton	Quarterback	Kentucky
30	Green Bay Packers	Tom Cichowski	Tackle	Maryland
31	Baltimore Colts	Butch Allison	Tackle	Missouri
32	Atlanta Falcons	Jerry Jones	Tackle	Bowling Green

=== Round 3 ===
Pick #	NFL team	Player	Position	College
33	Atlanta Falcons	Mike Dennis	Running back	Mississippi
34	Los Angeles Rams	Dick Tyson	Guard	Tulsa
35	Pittsburgh Steelers	Pat Killorin	Center	Syracuse
36	Philadelphia Eagles	Ben Hawkins	Wide receiver	Arizona State
37	San Francisco 49ers	Al Randolph	Running back	Iowa
38	Washington Redskins	Tom Barrington	Running back	Ohio State
39	Detroit Lions	Bill Malinchak	Wide receiver	Indiana
40	New York Giants	Tom Fisher	Linebacker	Tennessee
41	San Francisco 49ers	Dan Bland	Defensive back	Mississippi State
42	Minnesota Vikings	Don Hansen	Linebacker	Illinois
43	St. Louis Cardinals	Dave Long	Defensive end	Iowa
44	Chicago Bears	Bob Pickens	Tackle	Nebraska
45	Green Bay Packers	Fred Heron	Tackle	San Jose State
46	Green Bay Packers	Tony Jeter	End	Nebraska
47	Baltimore Colts	Rick Kestner	Wide receiver	Kentucky
48	Atlanta Falcons	Phil Sheridan	Wide receiver	Notre Dame

=== Round 4 ===
Pick #	NFL team	Player	Position	College
49	Atlanta Falcons	Ken Reaves	Defensive back	Norfolk State
50	Los Angeles Rams	Henry Dyer	Running back	Grambling
51	Chicago Bears	Randy Jackson	Tackle	Florida
52	Philadelphia Eagles	Frank Emanuel	Linebacker	Tennessee
53	Washington Redskins	Billy Clay	Defensive back	Mississippi
54	Baltimore Colts	Rod Sherman	Wide receiver	USC
55	Detroit Lions	Doug Van Horn	Guard	Ohio State
56	San Francisco 49ers	Don Parker	Guard	Virginia
57	Minnesota Vikings	Ron Acks	Defensive back	Illinois
58	St. Louis Cardinals	Gary Snook	Quarterback	Iowa
59	Detroit Lions	Willie Walker	Wide receiver	Tennessee State
60	Chicago Bears	Doug Buffone	Linebacker	Louisville
61	Cleveland Browns	Pete Duranko	Defensive end	Notre Dame
62	Green Bay Packers	John Roderick	Wide receiver	Southern Methodist
63	Baltimore Colts	Hoyle Granger	Running back	Mississippi State
64	Atlanta Falcons	Willie Asbury	Running back	Kent State

=== Round 5 ===
Pick #	NFL team	Player	Position	College
65	Atlanta Falcons	Bill Wolski	Running back	Notre Dame
66	Los Angeles Rams	Diron Talbert	Tackle	Texas
67	Detroit Lions	Bill Cody	Linebacker	Auburn
68	Philadelphia Eagles	Dan Berry	Running back	California
69	San Francisco 49ers	Mel Phillips	Defensive back	North Carolina A&T
70	Washington Redskins	Dick LeMay	Tackle	Vanderbilt
71	San Francisco 49ers	Steve Smith	Wide receiver	Michigan
72	Minnesota Vikings	Doug Davis	Tackle	Kentucky
73	St. Louis Cardinals	Jack Clancy	Wide receiver	Michigan
74	Cleveland Browns	Randy Schultz	Running back	Northern Iowa
75	New York Giants	Bill Briggs	Defensive end	Iowa
76	Minnesota Vikings	Bob Hall	Defensive back	Brown
77	Los Angeles Rams	Dick Arndt	Tackle	Idaho
78	Cleveland Browns	Dan Fulford	Wide receiver	Auburn
79	Dallas Cowboys	Walt Garrison	Running back	Oklahoma State
80	Atlanta Falcons	Martin Kahn	Tackle	North Texas State

=== Round 6 ===
Pick #	NFL team	Player	Position	College
81	Atlanta Falcons	Charley Casey	Wide receiver	Florida
82	Los Angeles Rams	Bruce Anderson	Tackle	Willamette
83	Minnesota Vikings	Wilbur Aylor	Tackle	Southwest Texas State
84	Philadelphia Eagles	Bob Sherlag	Defensive back	Memphis State
85	Chicago Bears	Dennis Brewster	Tackle	Brigham Young
86	Dallas Cowboys	Bob Dunlevy	Wide receiver	West Virginia
87	Detroit Lions	Wayne DeSutter	Tackle	Western Illinois
88	St. Louis Cardinals	Tim Van Galder	Quarterback	Iowa State
89	Philadelphia Eagles	Mel Tom	Linebacker	San Jose State
90	Cleveland Browns	Jim Battle	Defensive end	Southern
91	San Francisco 49ers	Charlie Johnson	Defensive tackle	Louisville
92	Chicago Bears	Franklin McRae	Defensive tackle	Tennessee State
93	Cleveland Browns	Fred Hoaglin	Center	Pittsburgh
94	Washington Redskins	Earl Yates	Tackle	Duke
95	Baltimore Colts	Stas Maliszewski	Linebacker	Princeton

=== Round 7 ===
Pick #	NFL team	Player	Position	College
96	Atlanta Falcons	William Johnson	Running back	University of the South
97	Los Angeles Rams	George Youngblood	Defensive back	Cal State-Los Angeles
98	Pittsburgh Steelers	Emerson Boozer	Running back	Maryland-Eastern Shore
99	Philadelphia Eagles	David Lince	Tackle	North Dakota
100	Dallas Cowboys	Art Robinson	Wide receiver	Florida A&M
101	Washington Redskins	George Patton	Tackle	Georgia
102	St. Louis Cardinals	Charley Arkwright	Tackle	Georgia
103	Detroit Lions	Johnnie Robinson	Wide receiver	Tennessee State
104	New York Giants	Phil Harris	Running back	Texas
105	Baltimore Colts	Dave Ellis	Defensive end	North Carolina State
106	Minnesota Vikings	Bob Meers	End	Massachusetts
107	Chicago Bears	Ron Meyer	Quarterback	South Dakota State
108	Green Bay Packers	Ray Miller	Defensive end	Idaho
109	Cleveland Browns	Leroy Carter	Wide receiver	Grambling
110	Baltimore Colts	Ray Perkins	Wide receiver	Alabama

=== Round 8 ===
Pick #	NFL team	Player	Position	College
111	Atlanta Falcons	Bill Goss	Linebacker	Tulane
112	Los Angeles Rams	Vilnis Ezerins	Running back	Wisconsin–Whitewater
113	New York Giants	Charlie Harper	Tackle	Oklahoma State
114	Philadelphia Eagles	John Mason	End	Stanford
115	Washington Redskins	Stan Mitchell	Running back	Tennessee
116	Dallas Cowboys	Don Kunit	Running back	Penn State
117	Detroit Lions	John Pincavage	Running back	Virginia
118	New York Giants	Bill Matan	Wide receiver	Kansas State
119	San Francisco 49ers	Dick Witcher	Wide receiver	UCLA
120	Baltimore Colts	Jerry Allen	Running back	Nebraska-Omaha
121	St. Louis Cardinals	Dan Goich	End	California
122	Chicago Bears	Doug McFalls	Defensive back	Georgia
123	Cleveland Browns	Tom Talaga	Wide receiver	Notre Dame
124	Green Bay Packers	Ken McLean	Wide receiver	Texas A&M
125	Baltimore Colts	Jack White	Quarterback	Penn State

=== Round 9 ===
Pick #	NFL team	Player	Position	College
126	Atlanta Falcons	Bob Sanders	Center	North Texas State
127	Los Angeles Rams	Burton Matthies	Running back	Wayne State
128	Pittsburgh Steelers	Dale Stewart	Defensive end	Pittsburgh
129	Philadelphia Eagles	Jim Todd	Running back	Ball State
130	Dallas Cowboys	Darrell Elam	Wide receiver	West Virginia Tech
131	Washington Redskins	Jack Shinholser	Linebacker	Florida State
132	New York Giants	Freeman White	Wide receiver	Nebraska
133	San Francisco 49ers	Kent Kramer	Wide receiver	Minnesota
134	Minnesota Vikings	Ron Green	Wide receiver	North Dakota
135	St. Louis Cardinals	Charlie Bryant	Wide receiver	Allen
136	Detroit Lions	Dick Cunningham	Guard	Arkansas
137	Chicago Bears	Fritz Greenlee	Wide receiver	Northern Arizona
138	Green Bay Packers	Ron Rector	Running back	Northwestern
139	Cleveland Browns	Jack Gregory	Defensive end	Delta State
140	Baltimore Colts	Jerry Gross	Running back	Auburn

=== Round 10 ===
Pick #	NFL team	Player	Position	College
141	Atlanta Falcons	Mike Bender	Guard	Arkansas
142	Los Angeles Rams	Mike Capshaw	Tackle	Abilene Christian
143	Pittsburgh Steelers	Jerry Marion	Defensive back	Wyoming
144	Philadelphia Eagles	John Osmond	Center	Tulsa
145	Washington Redskins	Caesar Belser	Defensive back	Arkansas-Pine Bluff
146	Dallas Cowboys	Mason Mitchell	Running back	Washington
147	San Francisco 49ers	Ron Sbranti	Defensive end	Utah State
148	Detroit Lions	Bruce Yates	Tackle	Auburn
149	St. Louis Cardinals	Mike Ringer	Running back	Oklahoma
150	Detroit Lions	Tom Brigham	Defensive end	Wisconsin
151	New York Giants	Jeff Smith	Linebacker	USC
152	Chicago Bears	Bobby Burnett	Running back	Arkansas
153	Cleveland Browns	Monte Ledbetter	Wide receiver	Northwestern State (LA)
154	Green Bay Packers	Sam Montgomery	Defensive end	Southern
155	Baltimore Colts	Claude Brownlee	Defensive end	Benedictine

=== Round 11 ===
Pick #	NFL team	Player	Position	College
156	Atlanta Falcons	Steve Sloan	Quarterback	Alabama
157	Los Angeles Rams	Darrell Hoover	Running back	Arizona
158	Pittsburgh Steelers	Charley Washington	Running back	Grambling
159	Philadelphia Eagles	Welford Walton	Defensive end	Nevada-Reno
160	Dallas Cowboys	Austin Denney	Wide receiver	Tennessee
161	Washington Redskins	Dick Reding	Wide receiver	Northwestern State (LA)
162	Minnesota Vikings	Stan Quintana	Defensive back	New Mexico
163	St. Louis Cardinals	Bobby Williams	Running back	Central State (OK)
164	Detroit Lions	Jack O'Billovich	Linebacker	Oregon State
165	New York Giants	Cliff Wilder	Wide receiver	Iowa
166	San Francisco 49ers	Preston Ridlehuber	Running back	Georgia
167	Chicago Bears	Terry Owens	Wide receiver	Jacksonville State
168	Green Bay Packers	Ralph Wenzel	Guard	San Diego State
169	Cleveland Browns	Tony Fire	Tackle	Bowling Green
170	Baltimore Colts	Eric Crabtree	Wide receiver	Pittsburgh

=== Round 12 ===
Pick #	NFL team	Player	Position	College
171	Atlanta Falcons	Ken Hollister	Tackle	Indiana
172	Los Angeles Rams	George Clayton	Defensive back	Fairmont State
173	Dallas Cowboys	Les Shy	Defensive back	Long Beach State
174	Philadelphia Eagles	Bruce Van Dyke	Guard	Missouri
175	Washington Redskins	John Stipech	Linebacker	Utah
176	Dallas Cowboys	Craig Baynham	Running back	Georgia Tech
177	St. Louis Cardinals	Rickey Johnson	Tackle	Clemson
178	Detroit Lions	Randy Winkler	Tackle	Tarleton State
179	New York Giants	Ken Avery	Linebacker	Southern Mississippi
180	San Francisco 49ers	Lyle Loebach	Tackle	Simpson
181	Minnesota Vikings	Bob Petrella	Defensive back	Tennessee
182	Chicago Bears	Wayne Page	Defensive end	Clemson
183	Cleveland Browns	Rich Czap	Tackle	Nebraska
184	Green Bay Packers	Jim Mankins	Running back	Florida State
185	Baltimore Colts	Jim Carer	Guard	Tennessee State

=== Round 13 ===
Pick #	NFL team	Player	Position	College
186	Atlanta Falcons	Bob Collins	Tackle	South Carolina
187	Los Angeles Rams	Jake David	Running back	Lamar
188	Pittsburgh Steelers	Benjy Dial	Quarterback	Eastern New Mexico
189	Philadelphia Eagles	Jim Bohl	Running back	New Mexico State
190	Dallas Cowboys	Ron Lamb	Running back	South Carolina
191	Washington Redskins	Heath Wingate	Center	Bowling Green
192	Detroit Lions	Bill Masselter	Tackle	Wisconsin
193	New York Giants	Jim Fulgham	Tackle	Minnesota
194	San Francisco 49ers	Jim Jackson	Running back	Western Illinois
195	Minnesota Vikings	Larry Martin	Tackle	San Diego State
196	St. Louis Cardinals	Jim Brown	Guard	Nebraska
197	Chicago Bears	Wayne Becker	Tackle	Montana
198	Green Bay Packers	Ed King	Linebacker	USC
199	Cleveland Browns	Jim Boudreaux	Tackle	Louisiana Tech
200	Baltimore Colts	Bob Hadrick	Wide receiver	Purdue

=== Round 14 ===
Pick #	NFL team	Player	Position	College
201	Atlanta Falcons	Steve Ecker	Kicker	Shippensburg
202	Los Angeles Rams	Terry Parks	Tackle	Cal State-Los Angeles
203	Pittsburgh Steelers	Joe Novogratz	Linebacker	Pittsburgh
204	Philadelphia Eagles	Ron Medved	Running back	Washington
205	Washington Redskins	Jerry Lovelace	Running back	Texas Tech
206	Dallas Cowboys	Lewis Turner	Running back	Norfolk State
207	New York Giants	Howard McCard	Guard	Syracuse
208	San Francisco 49ers	Elmer Collett	Center	Cal State-San Francisco
209	Minnesota Vikings	Howard Twilley	Wide receiver	Tulsa
210	St. Louis Cardinals	LaVerle Pratt	Linebacker	Idaho
211	Detroit Lions	Denis Moore	Tackle	USC
212	Chicago Bears	Mike Buckner	Defensive back	Northwestern
213	Cleveland Browns	Pete Lammons	End	Texas
214	Green Bay Packers	Ron Hanson	Wide receiver	North Dakota State
215	Baltimore Colts	Jim Ward	Quarterback	Gettysburg

=== Round 15 ===
Pick #	NFL team	Player	Position	College
216	Atlanta Falcons	Tom Tolleson	Wide receiver	Alabama
217	Los Angeles Rams	Mike Sullivan	Wide receiver	Oregon State
218	Pittsburgh Steelers	Joe Dobson	Tackle	Idaho
219	Philadelphia Eagles	Harry Day	Tackle	Memphis State
220	Dallas Cowboys	Mark Gartung	Tackle	Oregon State
221	Washington Redskins	Hal Seymour	Running back	Florida
222	San Francisco 49ers	Saint Saffold	Wide receiver	San Jose State
223	Minnesota Vikings	Hugh Wright	Running back	Adams State
224	St. Louis Cardinals	Darryl Alleman	Wide receiver	Wyoming
225	Detroit Lions	Bill Sullivan	Defensive end	West Virginia
226	New York Giants	Steve Bowman	Running back	Alabama
227	Chicago Bears	Jim Kollman	Guard	Oregon
228	Green Bay Packers	Grady Bolton	Tackle	Mississippi State
229	Cleveland Browns	Bob Ellis	Defensive end	Massachusetts
230	Baltimore Colts	Lee Garner	Linebacker	Mississippi

=== Round 16 ===
Pick #	NFL team	Player	Position	College
231	Atlanta Falcons	Jim Vining	Guard	Rice
232	Los Angeles Rams	Joe O'Brien	Wide receiver	Texas-Arlington
233	Pittsburgh Steelers	Jim Long	Wide receiver	Purdue
234	Philadelphia Eagles	Arunas Vasys	Linebacker	Notre Dame
235	Washington Redskins	Hal Wantland	Running back	Tennessee
236	Dallas Cowboys	Tom Piggee	Running back	Cal State-San Francisco
237	Minnesota Vikings	Jim Williams	Defensive end	Arkansas
238	St. Louis Cardinals	Dick Kasperek	Center	Iowa State
239	Detroit Lions	Jerry Gendron	Wide receiver	Wisconsin–Eau Claire
240	New York Giants	Sam Price	Running back	Illinois
241	San Francisco 49ers	Jim LeClair	Quarterback	C.W. Post
242	Chicago Bears	Lynn Senkbeil	Linebacker	Nebraska
243	Cleveland Browns	David Ray	End	Alabama
244	Green Bay Packers	Bob Schultz	Defensive end	Wisconsin–Stevens Point
245	Baltimore Colts	Rod Stewart	End	Duke

=== Round 17 ===
Pick #	NFL team	Player	Position	College
246	Atlanta Falcons	Lurley Archambeau	Center	Toledo
247	Los Angeles Rams	Dan Gilbert	Tackle	Arkansas Tech
248	Pittsburgh Steelers	Mike Brundage	Quarterback	Oregon
249	Philadelphia Eagles	Ike Kelley	Linebacker	Ohio State
250	Dallas Cowboys	George Allen	Tackle	West Texas State
251	Washington Redskins	Mitch Zalnasky	Wide receiver	Pittsburgh
252	St. Louis Cardinals	Benny Russell	Quarterback	Louisville
253	Detroit Lions	Ralph Dunlap	Defensive end	Baylor
254	New York Giants	Gary Eickman	Tackle	Illinois
255	San Francisco 49ers	Jim Breland	Center	Georgia Tech
256	Minnesota Vikings	Monroe Beard	Running back	Virginia Union
257	Chicago Bears	Curtis Gentry	Defensive back	Maryland-Eastern Shore
258	Green Bay Packers	Dave Hathcock	Defensive back	Memphis State
259	Cleveland Browns	Gene Modzelewski	Tackle	New Mexico State
260	Baltimore Colts	Randy Matson	Tackle	Texas A&M

=== Round 18 ===
Pick #	NFL team	Player	Position	College
261	Atlanta Falcons	Doug Korver	Center	Northern Iowa
262	Los Angeles Rams	Ray Johnson	Linebacker	Whitworth
263	Pittsburgh Steelers	Ken Lucas	Quarterback	Pittsburgh
264	Philadelphia Eagles	Bill Moorer	Center	Georgia Tech
265	Washington Redskins	Joe Burson	Running back	Georgia
266	Dallas Cowboys	Steve Orr	Tackle	Washington
267	Detroit Lions	Bill Johnson	Wide receiver	Livingston
268	New York Giants	Kai Anderson	Center	Illinois
269	San Francisco 49ers	Ron Parson	Wide receiver	Austin Peay
270	Minnesota Vikings	Dale Greco	Defensive tackle	Illinois
271	St. Louis Cardinals	Willie Jones	Defensive end	Kansas State
272	Chicago Bears	Charley Kines	Tackle	Michigan
273	Cleveland Browns	Charley Harraway	Running back	San Jose State
274	Green Bay Packers	Jim Jones	Defensive end	Nebraska-Omaha
275	Baltimore Colts	Ed Toner	Tackle	Massachusetts

=== Round 19 ===
Pick #	NFL team	Player	Position	College
276	Atlanta Falcons	Walt Mainer	Defensive back	Xavier
277	Los Angeles Rams	Homer Williams	Wide receiver	USC
278	Pittsburgh Steelers	Dave Neilson	Quarterback	Albion
279	Philadelphia Eagles	Taft Reed	Defensive back	Jackson State
280	Dallas Cowboys	Byron Johnson	Tackle	Central Washington
281	Washington Redskins	Andre White	Wide receiver	Florida A&M
282	New York Giants	Bobby Crockett	Wide receiver	Arkansas
283	San Francisco 49ers	Dick Fitzgerald	Tackle	Nebraska
284	Minnesota Vikings	Jessie Stokes	Running back	Corpus Christi State
285	St. Louis Cardinals	Tony Golmont	Defensive back	North Carolina State
286	Detroit Lions	Bob Baier	Tackle	Simpson
287	Chicago Bears	Roger Haberer	Running back	Eastern Illinois
288	Green Bay Packers	Dave Moton	Wide receiver	USC
289	Cleveland Browns	Karl Singer	Tackle	Purdue
290	Baltimore Colts	Ken Duke	Running back	Morgan State

=== Round 20 ===
Pick #	NFL team	Player	Position	College
291	Atlanta Falcons	Bob Riggle	Defensive back	Penn State
292	Los Angeles Rams	Bud Harrington	Running back	Tulsa
293	Pittsburgh Steelers	Ron Springer	Tackle	Albion
294	Philadelphia Eagles	Bill Risio	Tackle	Boston College
295	Washington Redskins	John Kelly	Center	Florida A&M
296	Dallas Cowboys	Lou Hudson	Wide receiver	Minnesota
297	San Francisco 49ers	Willie Walker	Wide receiver	Baylor
298	Philadelphia Eagles	Gerald Circo	Kicker	Cal State-Chico
299	St. Louis Cardinals	Tom Gallagher	Defensive end	Indiana
300	Detroit Lions	Allen Smith	Running back	Findlay
301	New York Giants	Randy Minniear	Running back	Purdue
302	Chicago Bears	Goldie Sellers	Wide receiver	Grambling
303	Cleveland Browns	Joe Petro	Defensive back	Temple
304	Green Bay Packers	Ed Maras	Wide receiver	South Dakota State
305	Baltimore Colts	Tom Carr	Tackle	Morgan State

= Pro Bowler	= Hall of Fame

== Hall of Famers ==
- Tom Mack, guard from University of Michigan taken 1st round 2nd overall by the Los Angeles Rams.

Inducted: Professional Football Hall of Fame class of 1999.

- Emmitt Thomas, wide receiver/quarterback from Bishop College, signed as an undrafted free agent by the Kansas City Chiefs, who converted him to cornerback.

Inducted: Professional Football Hall of Fame class of 2008.

== Notable undrafted players ==
^{†}	= Pro Bowler	= Hall of Fame

Original NFL team	Player	Pos.	College	Notes
Atlanta Falcons	Wade Traynham	K	Frederick	
Baltimore Colts	Bob Lurtsema	DE	Western Michigan	
Dallas Cowboys	Dick Daniels	S	Pacific	
Detroit Lions	Garo Yepremian ^{†}	K		
Green Bay Packers	Kent Nix	QB	TCU	
Minnesota Vikings	Jim Vellone	G	USC	
New York Giants	Willie Young	T	Grambling State	
St. Louis Cardinals	Jim Hart ^{†}	QB	Southern Illinois	
Washington Redskins	Harry Theofiledes	QB	Waynesburg	

== See also ==
- 1966 American Football League draft
- 1966 NFL expansion draft
