= 1967 Miami Dolphins season =

2nd season in franchise history

- Head coach: George Wilson
- Home stadium: Miami Orange Bowl

Results
- Record: 4–10
- Division place: 4th AFL Eastern
- Playoffs: Did not qualify
- Pro Bowlers: 4 DB Dick Westmoreland; LB John Bramlett; LE Jack Clancy; QB Bob Griese

The 1967 Miami Dolphins season was the team's second in the American Football League (AFL). The Dolphins improved by 1 game over their 3–11 inaugural season from 1966, finishing 4–10 and in 4th place in the AFL Eastern Division. The team began its season with two straight bye weeks. In the first game, they beat Denver, 35–21, to win their first ever season opener. However, the Dolphins then lost 8 straight games before beating the Buffalo Bills, 17–14, at home, for their first ever win against Buffalo. The Dolphins went winless on the road this season, the last time they would do that until the 2007 season. However, one of the high points during the season was scoring 40 points in back-to-back games, with 41–24 and 41–32 wins over the Chargers and Patriots, respectively. This season was also the rookie campaign for quarterback Bob Griese, who would spend his entire NFL career with the Dolphins which involved 3 Super Bowl trips and 2 Super Bowl titles, along with the only perfect season in NFL history.

== Offseason ==
=== Common draft ===
1967 Miami Dolphins draft
Round	Pick	Player	Position	College	Notes
1	4	Bob Griese * ^{†}	Quarterback	Purdue	
2	29	Jim Riley	Defensive end	Oklahoma	
4	84	Bob Greenlee	Tackle	Yale	
5	129	Gary Tucker	Running back	Chattanooga	
6	138	Bud Norris	Tight end	Washington State	
7	163	Larry Seiple	Punter/Tight end/Running back	Kentucky	
9	216	John Richardson	Defensive tackle	UCLA	
10	241	Tom Beier	Safety	Miami (FL)	
11	266	Jack Pyburn	Tackle	Texas A&M	
12	294	Stan Juk	Linebacker	South Carolina	
12	295	Jim Whitaker	Defensive back	Missouri	
14	344	Charles Stikes	Defensive back	Kent State	
15	372	Jake Ferro	Linebacker	Youngstown State	
16	397	Maurice Calhoun	Running back	Central State	
17	422	Mario Cordoves	Tackle	Miami (FL)	
Made roster † Pro Football Hall of Fame * Made at least one Pro Bowl during career

== Personnel ==
=== Staff / Coaches ===
1967 Miami Dolphins staff
Front office: President – Joe Robbie; Director of player personnel – Joe Thomas; Head coaches: Head coach – George Wilson; Offensive coaches: Offensive backs – John Idzik; Receivers – Bobby Walston; Offensive line – Ernie Hefferle	Defensive coaches: Defensive line – Les Bingaman; Linebackers – Bob Pellegrini; Defensive backs – Tom Keane; Special teams coaches: Kicking – Bobby Walston

=== Roster ===
1967 Miami Dolphins roster
Quarterbacks (QB): 12 Bob Griese; 11 Rick Norton; 16 Archie Roberts; 15 John Stofa; Running backs (RB): 32 Joe Auer; 31 George Chesser; 29 Jack Harper; 35 Stan Mitchell; Wide receivers (WR): 24 Jack Clancy; 26 Frank Jackson; 89 Karl Noonan; 81 Howard Twilley; Tight ends (TE): 36 Preston Carpenter; 82 Doug Moreau	Offensive linemen (OL): 73 Norm Evans T; 71 Charlie Fowler G; 58 Tom Goode C; 63 Billy Neighbors G; 65 Jack Pyburn T; 78 Maxie Williams T; 61 Fred Woodson G; Defensive linemen (DL): 86 Mel Branch DE; 81 Ed Cooke DE; 84 Ray Jacobs DT; 76 Tom Nomina DT; 74 John Richardson DT; 70 Jim Riley DE	Linebackers (LB): 57 John Bramlett OLB; 56 Bob Bruggers OLB; 50 Frank Emanuel OLB; 51 Jerry Hopkins MLB; 54 Wahoo McDaniel MLB; Defensive backs (DB): 47 Tom Beier SS; 43 Bob Neff FS; 48 Bob Petrella FS; 49 Jimmy Warren CB; 22 Willie West SS; 25 Dick Westmoreland CB; Special teams (ST): 5 Booth Lusteg K; 20 Larry Seiple P	Practice squad: Claude Brownlee DE; Bill Darnall S; Marv Davis T/G; Rick Kestner WR; 45 Mack Lamb S; Gary Tucker; Reserve: 53 Tom Erlandson LB (IR); -- Bud Norris TE (IR); 30 Sammy Price RB (IR); 75 Ken Rice G (IR); 87 John Roderick WR (IR); 59 Jack Thornton LB (IR); Rookies in italics

== Regular season ==
=== Schedule ===
Week	Date	Opponent	Result	Record	Venue	Attendance	Game Recap
1	Bye						
2	Bye						
3	September 17	Denver Broncos	**W** 35–21	1–0	Miami Orange Bowl	29,072	Recap
4	September 24	Kansas City Chiefs	**L** 0–24	1–1	Miami Orange Bowl	33,280	Recap
5	October 1	at **New York Jets**	**L** 7–29	1–2	Shea Stadium	59,433	Recap
6	October 8	at Kansas City Chiefs	**L** 0–41	1–3	Municipal Stadium	42,920	Recap
7	October 15	at **Boston Patriots**	**L** 10–41	1–4	Fenway Park	17,859	Recap
8	October 22	**New York Jets**	**L** 14–33	1–5	Miami Orange Bowl	28,392	Recap
9	Bye						
10	November 5	at **Buffalo Bills**	**L** 13–35	1–6	War Memorial Stadium	30,950	Recap
11	November 12	at San Diego Chargers	**L** 0–24	1–7	San Diego Stadium	32,395	Recap
12	November 19	at Oakland Raiders	**L** 17–31	1–8	Oakland–Alameda County Coliseum	33,753	Recap
13	November 26	**Buffalo Bills**	**W** 17–14	2–8	Miami Orange Bowl	24,357	Recap
14	December 3	at **Houston Oilers**	**L** 14–17	2–9	Rice Stadium	20,979	Recap
15	December 10	San Diego Chargers	**W** 41–24	3–9	Miami Orange Bowl	23,007	Recap
16	December 17	**Boston Patriots**	**W** 41–32	4–9	Miami Orange Bowl	22,079	Recap
17	December 23	**Houston Oilers**	**L** 10–41	4–10	Miami Orange Bowl	29,628	Recap
Note: Intra-division opponents are in **bold** text.

=== Game summaries ===
==== Week 14 ====
Team	1	2	3	4	Total
• Oilers	7	7	17	10	41
Dolphins	0	3	7	0	10

- Date: December 23
- Location: Orange Bowl

== Standings ==
AFL Eastern Division
	W	L	T	PCT	DIV	PF	PA	STK
Houston Oilers	9	4	1	.692	5–1–1	258	199	W2
New York Jets	8	5	1	.615	5–1–1	371	329	W1
Buffalo Bills	4	10	0	.286	3–5	237	285	L1
Miami Dolphins	4	10	0	.286	2–6	219	407	L1
Boston Patriots	3	10	1	.231	3–5	280	389	L5

Note: Tie games were not officially counted in the standings in the AFL.
