= 1966 Miami Dolphins season =

Inaugural season for Miami's AFL team

- Owner: Joe Robbie
- General manager: Chuck Burr
- Head coach: George Wilson
- Home stadium: Orange Bowl

Results
- Record: 3–11
- Division place: 5th AFL Eastern
- Playoffs: Did not qualify
- Pro Bowlers: 4 SS Willie West; DB Jimmy Warren; DE Ed Cooke; LB Tom Erlandson

The 1966 Miami Dolphins season was the team's inaugural year as an expansion franchise in the American Football League (AFL). The Dolphins were the first of two expansion teams in the AFL, founded by Minneapolis attorney-politician Joe Robbie and actor-comedian Danny Thomas. Future Harlem Globetrotters and Montreal Canadiens owner George N. Gillett, Jr. was a minority partner, and the team was led by head coach George Wilson. The franchise was granted in August 1965 for $7.5 million.

Their regular season debut on September 2 began with Joe Auer returning the opening kickoff 95 yards for a touchdown, but the Dolphins lost to the Oakland Raiders, 23–14. Auer was the leading scorer for the season and was named team MVP. With an odd number of teams, each of the nine AFL teams had two bye weeks and played fourteen games. Miami lost its first five games before beating the Denver Broncos in the Orange Bowl. The Dolphins defeated the Houston Oilers the following week for their first road win in franchise history, but then lost the next six consecutive games. In week 16, Miami won against the Oilers again to finish the season with a 3–11 record. Having defeated the Oilers twice, the Dolphins became the first ever expansion team in the Super Bowl era to sweep a division rival, and the last until the Jacksonville Jaguars did it in 1995 against the Cleveland Browns. Of the original roster, only two players (offensive tackle Norm Evans and wide receiver Howard Twilley) went on to play for the undefeated 1972 team.

== Offseason ==
The Dolphins selected players both via participation in the 1966 American Football League draft, held in November 1965, and via a dedicated "stocking draft" held in January 1966. In the latter, the Dolphins could select certain players from existing AFL teams.

=== AFL draft ===
With the first pick overall, the Dolphins selected running back Jim Grabowski out of the University of Illinois. Grabowski was also drafted by the Green Bay Packers in the National Football League's draft. The result was a bidding war between the two franchises to obtain Grabowski's services. The Packers signed Grabowski and he played for them for five seasons.

1966 Miami Dolphins draft
Round	Pick	Player	Position	College	Notes
1	1	Jim Grabowski	Running back	Illinois	Signed with the Green Bay Packers
1	2	Rick Norton	Quarterback	Kentucky	Played with the Dolphins 1966–1969
2	9	Frank Emanuel	Linebacker	Tennessee	Played with the Dolphins 1966–1969
3	18	Larry Gagner	Guard	Florida	Signed with the Pittsburgh Steelers
4	26	Dick Leftridge	Fullback	West Virginia	Signed with the Pittsburgh Steelers
5	34	Grady Bolton	Tackle	Mississippi State	
6	42	Ed Weisacosky	Linebacker	Miami (FL)	Played with the 1967 New York Giants, then with the Dolphins 1968–1970
7	51	Don Hansen	Linebacker	Illinois	Signed with the Minnesota Vikings
8	64	Bob Petrella	Defensive back	Tennessee	Played with the Dolphins 1966–1971
9	74	Bill Matan	Defensive end	Kansas State	
10	83	Pat Killorin	Cornerback	Syracuse	Signed with the Pittsburgh Steelers
11	92	Sammy Price	Running back	Illinois	Played with the Dolphins 1966–1968
12	101	Howard Twilley	Wide receiver	Tulsa	Played with the Dolphins 1966–1976
13	110	Kent Kramer	Tight end	Minnesota	Played in the NFL 1966–1974
14	119	Phil Scoggin	Placekicker	Texas A&M	
15	128	Jerry Oliver	Tackle	Texas State	
16	137	Don Lorenz	Defensive end	Stephen F. Austin	
17	146	Mike Bender	Guard	Arkansas	
18	155	Rich Kestner	End	Kentucky	
19	164	Doug Moreau	Tight end	Louisiana State	Played with the Dolphins 1966–1969
20	173	John Tooker	Defensive back	Adams State	
Made roster

=== AFL redshirt draft ===
1966 Miami Dolphins draft
Round	Pick	Player	Position	College	Notes
Redshirt 1	1	John Roderick	Wide receiver	SMU	
Redshirt 2	10	Danny Fulford	End	Auburn	
Redshirt 3	19	Jack Clancy *	Wide receiver	Michigan	
Redshirt 4	28	Jim Mankins	Running back	Florida State	
Redshirt 5	37	Fritz Greenlee	Linebacker	Northern Arizona	
Redshirt 6	46	Bill Darnall	Wide receiver	North Carolina	
Redshirt 7	55	Don Williams	Defensive tackle	Wofford	
Redshirt 8	64	Jon Brittenum	Quarterback	Arkansas	
Redshirt 9	73	Craig Baynham	Running back	Georgia Tech	
Redshirt 10	82	Randy Winkler	Tackle	Tarleton State	
Redshirt 11	91	Kai Anderson	Center	Illinois	
Made roster * Made at least one Pro Bowl during career

=== Undrafted free agents ===
1966 undrafted free agents of note
Player	Position	College
Karl Noonan	Wide receiver	Iowa
Jack Puglisi	Fullback	Wisconsin–Superior
Phil Ratner	Defensive end	Cornell

== Personnel ==
=== Coaches / Staff ===
1966 Miami Dolphins staff
Front office: President – Joe Robbie; Director of player personnel – Joe Thomas; Head coaches: Head coach – George Wilson; Offensive coaches: Offensive backs – John Idzik; Receivers – Bobby Walston; Offensive line – Ernie Hefferle	Defensive coaches: Defensive line – Les Bingaman; Linebackers – Bob Pellegrini; Defensive backs – Tom Keane; Special teams coaches: Kicking – Bobby Walston

=== Roster ===
1966 Miami Dolphins roster
Quarterbacks (QB): 15 John Stofa; 10 George Wilson P; 18 Dick Wood; Running backs (RB): 32 Joe Auer; 28 George Chesser P; 2 Cookie Gilchrist; 33 Billy Joe; 30 Sammy Price; Wide receivers (WR): 26 Frank Jackson; 82 Doug Moreau; 89 Karl Noonan; 40 Bo Roberson; Tight ends (TE): 90 Bill Cronin; 83 Dave Kocourek	Offensive linemen (OL): 73 Norm Evans T; 58 Tom Goode C; 65 Jim Higgins G/T; 52 Mike Hudock C; 63 Billy Neighbors G; 61 Ernie Park G; 75 Ken Rice G/T; 78 Maxie Williams T; Defensive linemen (DL): 32 Mel Branch DE; 72 Whit Canale DE/DT; 80 Ed Cooke DE; 79 Alphonse Dotson DT; 88 Laverne Torczon DE; 77 Rich Zecher DT	Linebackers (LB): 56 Bob Bruggers MLB; 50 Frank Emanuel MLB; 53 Tom Erlandson OLB; 35 Stan Mitchell OLB; 55 Jack Rudolph OLB; Defensive backs (DB): 44 Pete Jaquess FS; 43 Bob Neff CB; 48 Bob Petrella SS; 49 Jimmy Warren CB; 22 Willie West SS; 25 Dick Westmoreland CB; Special teams (ST): 21 Gene Mingo K	Practice squad: 84 Earl Faison DE; 24 Billy Hunter WR; 23 Wes Matthews WR; Reserve: -- Jim Davidson T (IR); 85 Johnny Holmes DE; 54 Wahoo McDaniel LB (IR); 47 John McGeever S (IR); 76 Tom Nomina DT (IR); 11 Rick Norton QB (IR); -- Ross O'Hanley S (IR); 87 John Roderick WR (IR); 59 Jack Thornton LB (IR); 81 Howard Twilley WR (IR); 46 Hal Wantland S (IR); -- Eddie Wilson QB (IR); Rookies in italics

== Schedule ==
=== Pre-season ===
Week	Date	Opponent	Result	Record	Attendance
1	August 6	at San Diego Chargers	**L** 10–38	0–1	
2	August 12	Kansas City Chiefs	**L** 0–33	0–2	34,277
3	August 20	New York Jets (at Jacksonville)	**L** 14–31	0–3	
4	August 24	Denver Broncos (at Memphis)	**L** 16–28	0–4	

=== Regular season ===
Two bye weeks were necessary in 1966, as the league expanded to an odd-number (9) of teams; one team was idle each week (three teams were idle in week one). The Dolphins played three teams from each division twice, and one in each once (Boston, San Diego)

Week	Date	Opponent	Result	Record	Venue	Attendance	Game Recap
1	September 2	Oakland Raiders	**L** 14–23	0–1	Miami Orange Bowl	25,188	Recap
2	September 9	**New York Jets**	**L** 14–19	0–2	Miami Orange Bowl	33,650	Recap
3	September 18	at **Buffalo Bills**	**L** 24–58	0–3	War Memorial Stadium	37,176	Recap
4	Bye						
5	October 2	at San Diego Chargers	**L** 10–44	0–4	Balboa Stadium	26,444	Recap
6	October 9	at Oakland Raiders	**L** 10–21	0–5	Oakland–Alameda County Coliseum	28,863	Recap
7	October 16	Denver Broncos	**W** 24–7	1–5	Miami Orange Bowl	22,191	Recap
8	October 23	at **Houston Oilers**	**W** 20–13	2–5	Rice Stadium	21,999	Recap
9	Bye						
10	November 6	**Buffalo Bills**	**L** 0–29	2–6	Miami Orange Bowl	36,685	Recap
11	November 13	at Kansas City Chiefs	**L** 16–34	2–7	Municipal Stadium	33,733	Recap
12	November 20	at **New York Jets**	**L** 13–30	2–8	Shea Stadium	57,092	Recap
13	November 27	**Boston Patriots**	**L** 14–20	2–9	Miami Orange Bowl	22,480	Recap
14	December 4	at Denver Broncos	**L** 7–17	2–10	Bears Stadium	32,116	Recap
15	December 11	Kansas City Chiefs	**L** 18–19	2–11	Miami Orange Bowl	17,881	Recap
16	December 18	**Houston Oilers**	**W** 29–28	3–11	Miami Orange Bowl	19,274	Recap
Note: Intra-division opponents are in **bold** text.

=== Game summaries ===
==== Week 1 ====
Team	1	2	3	4	Total
• Raiders	0	10	7	6	23
Dolphins	7	0	0	7	14

- Date: September 2
- Location: Miami Orange Bowl, Miami, Florida
- Game start: 8:00 p.m.
- Game weather: 82 °F (28 °C), wind 6 mph

Scoring summary
1	MIA	Joe Auer 95 yard kickoff return (Gene Mingo kick)	Miami 7–0
2	OAK	Mike Mercer 16 yard field goal	Miami 7–3
2	OAK	Hewritt Dixon 2 yard rush (Mike Mercer kick)	Oakland 10–7
3	OAK	Art Powell 16 yard pass from Tom Flores (Mike Mercer kick)	Oakland 17–7
4	MIA	Rick Casares 2 yard pass from Rick Norton (Mike Mercer kick)	Oakland 17–14
4	OAK	Tom Mitchell 16 yard pass from Tom Flores (Mike Mercer missed extra point kick)	Oakland 23–14

The Dolphins' regular season debut was a home game against the Oakland Raiders on Friday night, September 2; Miami running back Joe Auer returned the opening kickoff 95 yards for a touchdown. An extra point kick by Gene Mingo allowed the Dolphins to lead 7–0 barely into the start of the game. Miami was unable to retain the lead, however, with the Raiders scoring a field goal in the second quarter and two touchdowns (one each in the second and third quarters) – a total of 17 points. In the fourth quarter, the Dolphins narrowed the score with a touchdown reception from Rick Norton to Rick Casares. However, Oakland responded with another touchdown – a 16-yard pass to Tom Mitchell from Tom Flores. The game ended with a 23–14 loss for Miami.

==== Week 2 ====
Team	1	2	3	4	Total
• Jets	9	0	10	0	19
Dolphins	0	0	0	14	14

- Date: September 9
- Location: Miami Orange Bowl, Miami, Florida
- Game weather: 82 °F (28 °C), wind 10 mph

Scoring summary
1	NYJ	Safety Rick Norton tackled in the end zone	New York 2–0
1	NYJ	George Sauer, Jr. 20 yard pass from Mike Taliaferro (Jim Turner kick)	New York 9–0
3	NYJ	Bill Mathis 4 yard rush (Jim Turner Kick)	New York 16–0
3	NYJ	Jim Turner 45 yard field goal	New York 19–0
4	MIA	Dave Kocourek 43 yard pass from Rick Norton (Gene Mingo kick)	New York 19–7
4	MIA	Pete Jaquess 27 yard interception return (Gene Mingo kick)	New York 19–14

In their first ever intradivisional game, the Dolphins played against the AFL Eastern Division rival New York Jets at the Orange Bowl on Friday night, September 9. Miami trailed the entire game, with the Jets scoring a safety (by tackling Rick Norton in the end zone) and a touchdown in the first quarter. New York added a field goal and a touchdown in the third quarter, while holding Miami scoreless until the fourth quarter. By then, the Dolphins scored a touchdown – a 43-yard reception from Norton to Dave Kocourek. Later in the quarter, Jets quarterback Joe Namath was intercepted by defensive back Pete Jaquess, who returned the ball 27 yards for another touchdown. However, Miami was unable to complete a comeback and lost 19–14.

==== Week 3 ====
Team	1	2	3	4	Total
Dolphins	3	7	0	14	24
• Bills	21	27	3	7	58

- Date: September 18
- Location: War Memorial Stadium, Buffalo, New York
- Game weather: 61 °F (16 °C), wind 3 mph

Scoring summary
1	BUF	Jack Kemp 1 yard rush (Booth Lusteg)	Buffalo 7–0
1	BUF	Butch Byrd 60 yard interception return (Booth Lusteg kick)	Buffalo 14–0
1	BUF	Butch Byrd 72 yard punt return (Booth Lusteg kick)	Buffalo 21–0
1	MIA	Gene Mingo 24 yard field goal	Buffalo 21–3
2	BUF	Bobby Crockett 26 yard pass from Jack Kemp (Booth Lusteg kick)	Buffalo 28–3
2	BUF	Bobby Burnett 1 yard rush (Booth Lusteg kick)	Buffalo 35–3
2	BUF	Bobby Burnett 3 yard rush (Booth Lustef missed extra point kick)	Buffalo 41–3
2	MIA	John Roderick 4 yard pass from George Wilson (Gene Mingo kick)	Buffalo 41–10
2	BUF	Jack Spikes 11 yard rush (Booth Lusteg kick)	Buffalo 48–10
3	BUF	Booth Lusteg 13 yard field goal	Buffalo 51–10
4	MIA	Bo Roberson 66 yard pass from George Wilson (Gene Mingo kick)	Buffalo 51–17
4	BUF	Jack Spikes 18 yard pass from Daryle Lamonica (Booth Lusteg kick)	Buffalo 58–17
4	MIA	Dave Kocourek 13 yard pass from George Wilson (Gene Mingo kick)	Buffalo 58–24

For their first division rivalry game against the Buffalo Bills on September 18, Miami traveled to the War Memorial Stadium in Buffalo. The Bills dominated the Dolphins throughout the game. In the first quarter, the Buffalo scored three touchdown before Miami kicked a field goal. The Bills then added four touchdowns in the second quarter, versus one by the Dolphins. After the first half, the score was 48–10 in favor of the Bills. The only score in the third quarter was a field goal by Booth Lusteg of Buffalo. Three touchdowns were scored in the fourth quarter, two for Miami and one for Buffalo. The Bills defeated the Dolphins by a score of 58–24, which remains one of the worst losses by Miami in the history of the Bills–Dolphins rivalry.

==== Week 5 ====
Team	1	2	3	4	Total
Dolphins	3	7	0	0	10
• Chargers	0	6	10	28	44

- Date: October 2
- Location: Balboa Stadium, San Diego, California
- Game attendance: 26,444
- Game weather: 71 °F (22 °C), wind 9 mph

Scoring summary
1	MIA	Gene Mingo 27 yard field goal	Miami 3–0
2	MIA	Karl Noonan 20 yard pass from Dick Wood (Gene Mingo kick)	Miami 10–0
2	SAN	Rick Redman 58 yard fumble return (Dick Van Raaphorst missed extra point kick)	Miami 10–6
3	SAN	Dick Van Raaphorst 9 yard field goal	Miami 10–9
3	SAN	Gene Foster 25 yard pass from Steve Tensi (Dick Van Raaphorst kick)	San Diego 16–10
4	SAN	Lance Alworth 44 yard pass from Steve Tensi (Dick Van Raaphorst kick)	San Diego 23–10
4	SAN	Gene Foster 63 yard pass from Steve Tensi (Dick Van Raaphorst kick)	San Diego 30–10
4	SAN	Lance Alworth 36 yard pass from Steve Tensi (Dick Van Raaphorst kick)	San Diego 37–10
4	SAN	Willie Frazier 30 yard pass from Steve Tensi (Dick Van Raaphorst kick)	San Diego 44–10

Coming off their first bye week, the Miami Dolphins traveled to Balboa Stadium in San Diego in week 5 in search for their first win. The Dolphins began the game with a 10-point lead – a field goal by Gene Mingo and a Karl Noonan touchdown via a 20-yard pass from Dick Wood. However, the Chargers took the lead in the third quarter following two touchdowns and a field goal, with a score of 16–10 as the quarter ended. In the fourth quarter, San Diego put the game away and delivered another blowout for Miami, scoring four touchdowns (28 points), while preventing the Dolphins from receiving additional points. The game ended with a score of 44–10 in favor of the Chargers. The Dolphins win–loss record fell to 0–4.

==== Week 6 ====
Team	1	2	3	4	Total
Dolphins	3	7	0	0	10
• Raiders	0	14	0	7	21

- Date: October 9
- Location: Oakland–Alameda County Coliseum, Oakland, California
- Game attendance: 28,863
- Game weather: 64 °F (18 °C), wind 7 mph

Scoring summary
1	MIA	Gene Mingo 47 yard field goal	Miami 3–0
2	OAK	Art Powell 25 yard pass from Tom Flores (Mike Eischeid kick)	Oakland 7–3
2	MIA	Joe Auer 3 yard rush (Gene Mingo kick)	Miami 10–7
2	OAK	Roger Hagberg 24 yard pass from Tom Flores (Mike Eischeid kick)	Oakland 14–10
4	OAK	Fred Biletnikoff 4 yard pass from Tom Flores (Mike Eischeid kick)	Oakland 21–10

In a second game against the Oakland Raiders on October 9, the Miami Dolphins traveled to the Oakland–Alameda County Coliseum. Miami took the lead in the first quarter, with a 47-yard field goal by Gene Mingo. In the second quarter, Oakland took the lead after a touchdown, while Miami re-took the lead with a touchdown of their own. However, before the end of the second quarter, Oakland again re-took the lead with another touchdown. The first half of the game ended with a score of 14–10 in favor of the Raiders. Neither team received additional points in the third quarter. Oakland put the game away in the fourth quarter by scoring another touchdown. The match ended with a 21–10 loss for Miami.

==== Week 7 ====
Team	1	2	3	4	Total
Broncos	7	0	0	0	7
• Dolphins	10	0	7	7	24

- Date: October 16
- Location: Orange Bowl, Miami, Florida
- Game attendance: 22,191
- Game weather: 77 °F (25 °C), wind 9 mph

Scoring summary
1	MIA	Billy Joe 67 yard pass from George Wilson (Gene Mingo kick)	Miami 7–0
1	MIA	Gene Mingo 35 yard field goal	Miami 10–0
1	DEN	Abner Haynes 5 yard rush (Gary Kroner kick)	Miami 10–7
3	MIA	Joe Auer 1 yard rush (Gene Mingo kick)	Miami 17–10
4	MIA	Joe Auer 3 yard rush (Gene Mingo kick)	Miami 24–7

After being on the road since week 3, the Miami Dolphins returned home in week 7 for a contest against the Denver Broncos on October 16. Miami scored a touchdown and field goal in the first quarter, with a 67-yard pass from George Wilson to Billy Joe and a Gene Mingo field goal. The Broncos scored a touchdown later in the first quarter. Subsequently, the Dolphins scored one touchdown each in the third and fourth quarters – 1 yard and 3 yard rushes by Joe Auer, respectively. However, Denver was unable to earn additional points following the first quarter. As a result, the Miami Dolphins won the game by a score of 24–7. This was the first win by the franchise and raised their win–loss record to 1–5.

==== Week 8 ====
Team	1	2	3	4	Total
• Dolphins	7	7	3	3	20
Oilers	0	3	10	0	13

- Date: October 23
- Location: Rice Stadium, Houston, Texas
- Game attendance: 21,999
- Game weather: 70 °F (21 °C), wind 5 mph

Scoring summary
1	MIA	Bo Roberson 80 yard pass from George Wilson (Gene Mingo kick)	Miami 7–0
2	HOU	George Blanda 16 yard field goal	Miami 7–3
2	MIA	Cookie Gilchrist 13 yard pass from George Wilson (Gene Mingo kick)	Miami 14–3
3	HOU	George Blanda 43 yard field goal	Miami 14–6
3	MIA	Gene Mingo 43 yard field goal	Miami 17–6
3	HOU	Ode Burrell 13 yard pass from George Blanda (George Blanda kick)	Miami 17–13
4	MIA	Gene Mingo 42 yard field goal	Miami 20–13

The Dolphins returned to the road again in week 8, traveling to Rice Stadium to take on the Houston Oilers on October 23. Miami scored first with a touchdown in the first quarter – an 80-yard reception from George Wilson to Bo Roberson. George Blanda of the Oilers kicked a field goal in the second quarter, but the Dolphins responded with another touchdown. In the third quarter, Blanda kicked another field goal, but Gene Mingo of the Dolphins also scored a field goal. Houston finally reached the endzone later in the third quarter to narrow the match to a 4-point game. However, Mingo kicked another field goal in the fourth quarter, ending the game with a 20–13 win for Miami. The Dolphins improved to 2–5.

==== Week 10 ====
Team	1	2	3	4	Total
• Bills	0	10	10	9	29
Dolphins	0	0	0	0	0

- Date: November 6
- Location: Orange Bowl, Miami, Florida
- Game attendance: 36,685
- Game weather: 76 °F (24 °C), wind 16 mph

Scoring summary
2	BUF	Bobby Burnett 16 yard pass from Jack Kemp (Booth Lusteg)	Buffalo 7–0
2	BUF	Booth Lusteg 44 yard field goal	Buffalo 10–0
3	BUF	Booth Lusteg 44 yard field goal	Buffalo 13–0
3	BUF	Bobby Burnett 3 yard rush (Booth Lusteg kick)	Buffalo 20–0
4	BUF	Paul Costa 4 yard pass from Jack Kemp (Booth Lusteg kick)	Buffalo 27–0
4	BUF	Safety, Marty Schottenheimer blocked punt	Buffalo 29–0

After the second bye week, Miami returned home for another game against the Buffalo Bills on November 6. As during week 3, the Bills again dominated the match. After neither club scored in the first quarter, Buffalo scored a touchdown and a field goal in both the second and third quarters. In the fourth quarter, the Bills scored a third touchdown. Later, Buffalo received two points from a safety after Marty Schottenheimer blocked a punt. Miami was unable to score points throughout the game and lost 29–0, their first regular season shutout loss. The Dolphins fell to 2–6.

==== Week 11 ====
Team	1	2	3	4	Total
Dolphins	0	10	0	6	16
• Chiefs	17	14	3	0	34

- Date: November 13
- Location: Municipal Stadium, Kansas City, Missouri
- Game attendance: 33,733
- Game weather: 45 °F (7 °C), wind 6 mph

Scoring summary
1	KC	Bert Coan 1 yard rush (Mike Mercer kick)	Kansas City 7–0
1	KC	Mike Mercer 22 yard field goal	Kansas City 10–0
1	KC	Fred Arbanas 26 yard pass from Len Dawson (Mike Mercer kick)	Kansas City 17–0
2	KC	Otis Taylor 89 yard pass from Len Dawson (Mike Mercer missed extra point kick)	Kansas City 23–0
2	MIA	Gene Mingo 28 yard field foal	Kansas City 23–3
2	MIA	Jimmy Warren 70 yard interception return (Gene Mingo kick)	Kansas City 23–10
2	KC	Chris Burford 35 yard pass from Len Lawson (two point conversion)	Kansas City 31–10
3	KC	Mike Mercer 19 yard field goal	Kansas City 34–10
4	MIA	Joe Auer 1 yard rush (two point conversion failed)	Kansas City 34–16

In the following week, the Dolphins traveled to Municipal Stadium to take on the Kansas City Chiefs. However, Miami was quickly overtaken. Kansas City reached a 23-point lead – three touchdowns (one missed extra point) and one field goal – before the Dolphins finally scored a field goal in the second quarter. Miami followed up with a touchdown, but Kansas City scored another touchdown before the end of the quarter. In the third quarter, the Chiefs added another field goal to their score. The Dolphins scored another touchdown in the fourth quarter, but the team fell well short of making a comeback. The game ended with a 34–16 loss for Miami, with their record falling to 2–7.

==== Week 12 ====
Team	1	2	3	4	Total
Dolphins	6	0	0	7	13
• Jets	0	10	13	7	30

- Date: November 20
- Location: Shea Stadium, New York City, New York
- Game attendance: 57,092
- Game weather: 36 °F (2 °C) (27 °F (−3 °C) wind chill), wind 16 mph

Scoring summary
1	MIA	Gene Mingo 31 yard field goal	Miami 3–0
1	MIA	Gene Mingo 20 field goal	Miami 6–0
2	NYJ	Emerson Boozer 1 yard rush (Jim Turner kick)	New York 7–6
2	NYJ	Jim Turner 10 yard field goal	New York 10–6
3	NYJ	Emerson Boozer 96 yard kickoff return	New York 17–6
3	NYJ	Jim Turner 26 yard field goal	New York 20–6
3	NYJ	Jim Turner 18 yard field goal	New York 23–6
4	NYJ	Joe Auer 11 yard pass from Dick Wood (Gene Mingo kick)	New York 23–13
4	MIA	Mark Smolinski 1 yard rush (Jim Turner kick)	New York 30–13

During week 12, the Dolphins traveled to Shea Stadium in New York City for their second match-up against the Jets on November 20. Miami built a six-point lead in the first quarter with two field goals by Gene Mingo. However, they would not maintain their lead. In the second quarter, the Jets scored a touchdown and a field goal, before adding another touchdown and two additional field goals in the third quarter. Miami, down 23–6 at the close of the third quarter, finally scored again with a touchdown in the fourth quarter. The Dolphins were unable to overcome the deficit, and New York scored another touchdown before the end of regulation. The game ended with a 30–13 loss for Miami, dropping their record to 2–8.

==== Week 13 ====
Team	1	2	3	4	Total
• Patriots	0	10	10	0	20
Dolphins	0	0	7	7	14

- Date: November 27
- Location: Orange Bowl, Miami, Florida
- Game attendance: 22,480
- Game weather: 63 °F (17 °C), wind 6 mph

Scoring summary
2	BP	Art Graham 22 yard pass from Babe Parilli (Gino Cappelletti kick)	Boston 7–0
2	BP	Gino Cappelletti 32 yard field goal	Boston 10–0
2	BP	Gino Cappelletti 49 yard field goal	Boston 13–0
3	BP	Jim Nance 27 yard rush (Gino Capelletti kick)	Boston 20–0
3	MIA	Frank Jackson 32 yard pass from Dick Wood (Gene Mingo kick)	Boston 20–7
4	MIA	Joe Auer 38 yard pass from Dick Wood (Gene Mingo kick)	Boston 20–14

In their first game against the division rival Boston Patriots, the Dolphins hosted the Patriots at the Orange Bowl on November 27. After neither team scored in the first quarter, the Patriots scored twice in the first quarter, with a touchdown pass from Babe Parilli to Art Graham and then a 32-yard field goal by Gino Cappelletti. The first half of the game closed with a 13–0 lead for Boston. A rushing touchdown by Jim Nance allowed the Patriots to increase their lead to 20–0. Later in the third quarter, the Dolphins finally scored with a 32-yard pass from Dick Wood to Frank Jackson. In the fourth quarter, another Miami touchdown pass from Wood to Joe Auer for 38 yards further reduced the Patriots lead to 20–14. However, with no additional scores by either team, the game ended with a 20–14 loss for the Miami Dolphins, causing them to fall to 2–9.

==== Week 14 ====
Team	1	2	3	4	Total
Dolphins	0	7	0	0	7
• Broncos	0	10	7	0	17

- Date: December 4
- Location: Bears Stadium, Denver, Colorado
- Game attendance: 32,116
- Game weather: 32 °F (0 °C) (28 °F (−2 °C) wind chill), wind 4 mph

Scoring summary
2	DEN	Gary Kroner 28 yard field goal	Denver 3–0
2	MIA	Tom Erlandson 26 yard interception return (Gene Mingo kick)	Miami 7–3
2	DEN	Max Choboian 1 yard rush (Gary Kroner kick)	Denver 10–7
3	DEN	Charley Mitchell 79 yard pass from Max Choboian (Gary Kroner kick)	Denver 17–7

For week 14, the Dolphins traveled to Bears Stadium in Denver for another game against the Broncos on December 4. The game was a low-scoring affair. After neither team scored in the first quarter, Denver put points on the board with a Gary Kroner field goal, before Miami countered with Tom Erlandson scoring a touchdown after returning an interception 26 yards. However, the Broncos responded with a touchdown before the end of the second quarter. Denver scored another touchdown in the third quarter. Following that, neither Miami nor Denver any additional points in the third or fourth quarter. The game ended with a 17–7 loss for Miami, dropping their record to 2–10.

==== Week 15 ====
Team	1	2	3	4	Total
• Chiefs	3	3	0	13	19
Dolphins	0	11	0	7	18

- Date: December 11
- Location: Orange Bowl, Miami, Florida
- Game attendance: 17,881
- Game weather: 70 °F (21 °C), wind 9 mph

Scoring summary
1	KC	Mike Mercer 37 yard field goal	Kansas City 3–0
2	KC	Mike Mercer 13 yard field goal	Kansas City 6–0
2	MIA	Gene Mingo 35 yard field goal	Kansas City 6–3
2	MIA	Dick Westmoreland 39 yard interception return (two point conversion)	Miami 11–6
4	KC	Curtis McClinton 49 yard rush (Mike Mercer kick)	Kansas City 13–11
4	MIA	Dick Wood 7 yard rush (Gene Mingo kick)	Miami 18–13
4	KC	Chris Burford 25 yard pass from Len Dawson (two point conversion failed)	Kansas City 19–18

Miami returned home for their second match against Kansas City on December 11. The Chiefs opened up with two Mike Mercer field goals, with one each in the first and second quarters. Later in the second quarter, the Dolphins scored a field goal and a touchdown (with a 2-point conversion) to close the first half 11–6. After no scores in the third quarter, Kansas City was the first team to put more points on the board with a touchdown in the fourth quarter. Miami then scored another touchdown to take the lead in the fourth quarter. However, the Chiefs countered with a touchdown before the game ended. Miami lost by a score of 19–18.

==== Week 16 ====
Team	1	2	3	4	Total
Oilers	7	14	0	7	28
• Dolphins	0	8	7	14	29

- Date: December 18
- Location: Orange Bowl, Miami, Florida
- Game attendance: 19,274
- Game weather: 71 °F (22 °C), wind 10 mph

Scoring summary
1	HOU	Hoyle Granger 27 yard pass from Don Trull (George Blanda kick)	Houston 7–0
2	HOU	Larry Elkins 11 yard pass from Don Trull (George Blanda kick)	Houston 14–0
2	MIA	Joe Auer 27 yard pass from John Stofa (two point conversion)	Houston 14–8
2	HOU	Bob McLeod 2 yard pass from Don Trull (George Blanda kick)	Houston 21–8
3	MIA	Frank Jackson 48 yard pass from John Stofa (Gene Mingo kick)	Houston 21–15
4	HOU	Don Trull 1 yard rush (George Blanda kick)	Houston 28–15
4	MIA	Bill Cronin 4 yard pass from John Stofa (Gene Mingo kick)	Houston 28–22
4	MIA	Joe Auer 14 yard pass from John Stofa (Gene Mingo kick)	Miami 29–28

In the final game of their inaugural season, the Dolphins hosted the Oilers at the Orange Bowl on December 18. The Oilers mounted a 14–0 lead before the Dolphins scored – a 27-yard pass from Don Trull to Hoyle Granger in the first quarter and an 11-yard pass from Trull to Larry Elkins. Miami then responded with a 27-yard pass from John Stofa to Joe Auer and a successful 2-point conversion. Houston added seven more points with a 2-yard pass from Trull to Bob McLeod. By the end of the first half of the game, the Oilers led by 21–8. The third quarter saw a 48-yard touchdown pass from Stofa to Frank Jackson, cutting the Oilers' lead to 21–15. In the fourth quarter, Houston scored again with a 1-yard rush from Trull. The Dolphins scored a pair of touchdowns in the fourth quarter, via a 4-yard pass from Stofa to Bill Cronin and a 14-yard pass from Stofa to Auer. With no further scores by either team, the game ended with a 29-28 win for the Miami Dolphins. Miami ended their season with a win–loss record of 3–11.

== Standings ==
AFL Eastern Division
	W	L	T	PCT	DIV	PF	PA	STK
Buffalo Bills	9	4	1	.692	6–2	358	255	W1
Boston Patriots	8	4	2	.667	5–1–1	315	283	L1
New York Jets	6	6	2	.500	4–3–1	322	312	W1
Houston Oilers	3	11	0	.214	1–7	335	396	L8
Miami Dolphins	3	11	0	.214	2–5	213	362	W1

Note: Tie games were not officially counted in the standings in the AFL.

== Awards and honors ==
- Tom Erlandson, American Football League All-Star game selection
- Jimmy Warren, American Football League All-Star game selection
- Willie West, American Football League All-Star game selection
