= List of Miami Dolphins starting quarterbacks =

The Miami Dolphins are a professional American football team based in the Miami metropolitan area. They are members of the East Division of the American Football Conference (AFC) in the National Football League (NFL). Lawyer Joe Robbie and actor Danny Thomas were granted enfranchisement on August 15, 1965, committing their team as the ninth member of the American Football League (AFL).

The Dolphins have had 40 different starting quarterbacks (QB) in their franchise history; only George Mira and Tyler Thigpen have started one game for the Dolphins.^{[a]} The Dolphins' first starting quarterback was Dick Wood during the first inaugural season game in 1966, against the Oakland Raiders; Wood however was replaced a week later by rookie Rick Norton due to inconsistency. Notable Dolphin starting quarterbacks include Pro Football Hall of Fame inductees Bob Griese and Dan Marino, who together combined for 391 total starts and 239 wins all with the Dolphins. Other standouts include Earl Morrall, Don Strock, David Woodley, Jay Fiedler, and Chad Pennington.

The Miami Dolphins entered the 2012 season with the franchise's 32nd different starting quarterback Ryan Tannehill. He is the first rookie to ever start on opening day for the Dolphins.

== History ==
=== Inception ===
The Miami Dolphins entered their inaugural season in 1966 with Dick Wood as their starting quarterback against the Oakland Raiders. By the end of the first half Wood had thrown four interceptions, two of which translated to ten points by the Raiders. Rookie replacement Rick Norton finished the second half of the game and started the next two games against the New York Jets and Buffalo Bills. Trailing 41–3 against the Bills, Norton was benched in favor of rookie punter George Wilson Jr., who played quarterback in college at Xavier University. Wilson outscored the Bills 21–17 during his 40 minutes of playing time, throwing three touchdowns and passing for 185 yards.

I never thought I'd be the No. 1 Quarterback.

— George Wilson Jr.

Wilson went on to start the next seven games for the Dolphins. During that time Wilson collected the franchise's first and second victories against the Denver Broncos on October 16, and followed it up a week later with a victory against the Houston Oilers. However, during the week twelve game against the New York Jets, Wilson suffered a shoulder injury that sidelined him for the remainder of the season.

Dick Wood started the next three games for the Dolphins, but didn't finish the season as rookie quarterback John Stofa started the final game against the Houston Oilers. Stofa led the team to its third and final victory of the season by beating the Oilers, 29–28.

=== Bob Griese era ===
Bob Griese, a quarterback from Purdue, was selected by the Miami Dolphins as the fourth pick in the first round of the 1967 Common draft. Entering the 1967 season, rookie Griese was slated to develop as a backup quarterback behind John Stofa. However, due to an ankle injury suffered during the first game of the season, Stofa was sidelined, and Griese finished the game leading the Dolphins to 35–21 victory over the Denver Broncos. Griese started the next two games, but sustained an injury during the Week 5 game against the New York Jets and was replaced by Rick Norton for three games. Griese resumed the role of starting QB for the remaining eight games of his rookie season.

For the next 13 seasons Griese started a majority of the Miami Dolphins' games. During that tenure Griese became the first Miami Dolphins quarterback to start all of the season's games in 1970, led by head coach Don Shula. In the same year the Dolphins collected their first winning season and playoff berth, but lost against the Oakland Raiders, 21–14, in the divisional round. The following year, 1971, the Dolphins made their first Super Bowl appearance against the Dallas Cowboys, but lost, 24–3.

In 1972, Griese started and won the first five games of the season but fell victim to injury against the San Diego Chargers. Earl Morrall started and won the remaining nine games of season. Morrall started both the Divisional and AFC conference games, but Griese returned to start Super Bowl VII. Griese's 14–7 win against the Washington Redskins completed the NFL's first and only perfect season. Earl Morrall's performance earned him the NFL's inaugural Comeback Player of the Year Award. Starting 11 of the season's 17 games, contributions from his 1972 season and further performances in his career have listed him as one of the top backup quarterbacks in NFL history.

In 1973, Griese started 13 regular-season games and led the Dolphins to their third consecutive Super Bowl appearance, the first in NFL history and second consecutive Super Bowl victory in Super Bowl VIII, the second in NFL history.

Over the next seven years Griese started 74 regular-season and three playoff games. He sustained a multitude of injuries and shared the starting role with quarterbacks Morrall, Don Strock, and David Woodley, but finally in 1980, against the Baltimore Colts, Griese sustained a shoulder injury that would prompt him to retire at the end of the season.

In his career, Griese played in six Pro Bowls and two all-star games, was elected the Dolphins' MVP six times, and was named All-Pro in 1971 and 1977. Throughout the 1970s the Miami Dolphins had the highest winning percentage in all of professional sports. Griese was inducted into the Pro Football Hall of Fame in 1990.

Following the end of Griese's tenure, quarterback David Woodley became the Dolphins' starting quarterback and continued the Dolphins' success. Woodley made it to the playoffs in 1981 and in 1982. During the 1982 season the Dolphins lost in their fourth Super Bowl appearance against the Washington Redskins, 27–17. In 1983, Woodley lost the starting job to rookie quarterback Dan Marino. David Woodley is known as being the transition quarterback between Bob Griese and Dan Marino.

=== Dan Marino era ===
Dan Marino, a quarterback from the University of Pittsburgh, was selected by the Miami Dolphins as the 27th pick, in the first round of the 1983 NFL Draft. Much like Griese, Marino was slated to develop under starting quarterback David Woodley. During the third game of the season against the Los Angeles Raiders, Marino saw his first action as an NFL quarterback, and passed for ninety yards and threw for two touchdowns. Following a loss during week 4, Marino replaced Woodley, and the following week started his first game against the Buffalo Bills. Miami, however, lost the game in overtime 38–35.

== Starting quarterbacks by season ==
Year	Column links to corresponding team season
(#)	Number of games started in the regular season or postseason win–loss record
†	Inducted to the Pro Football Hall of Fame

=== Regular season ===
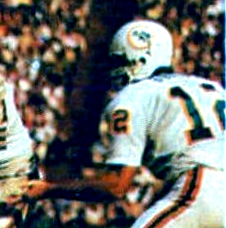
Bob Griese (1967–1980)

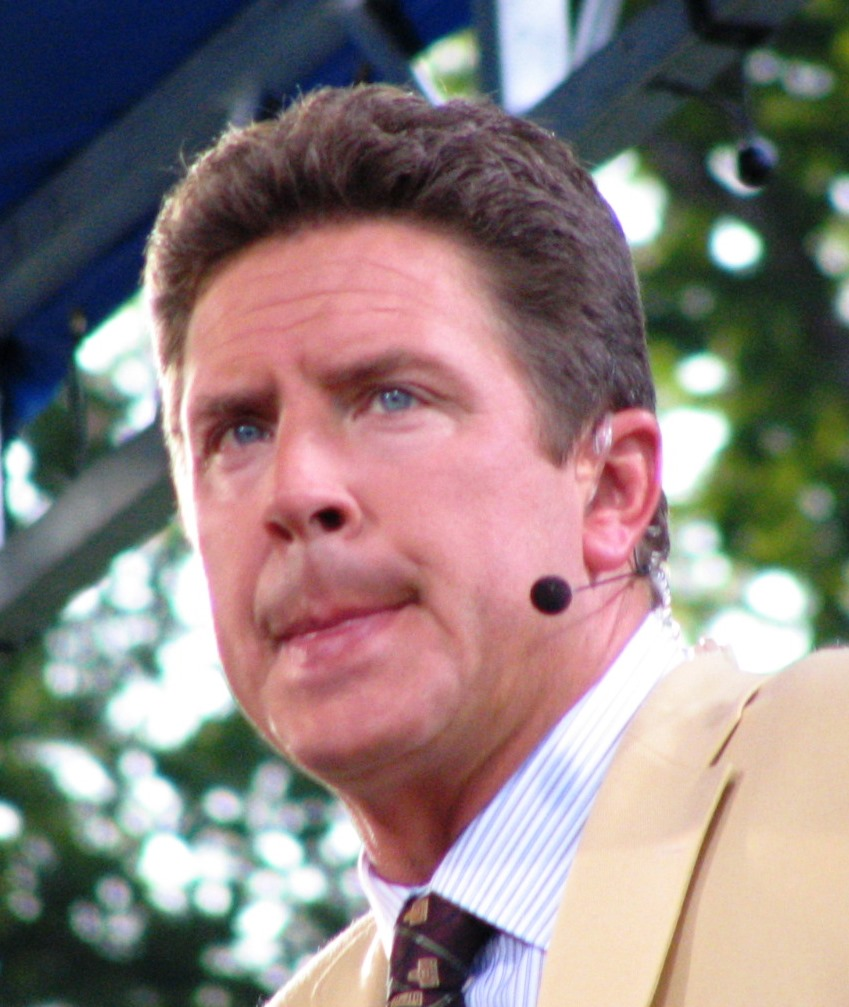
Dan Marino (1983–1999)

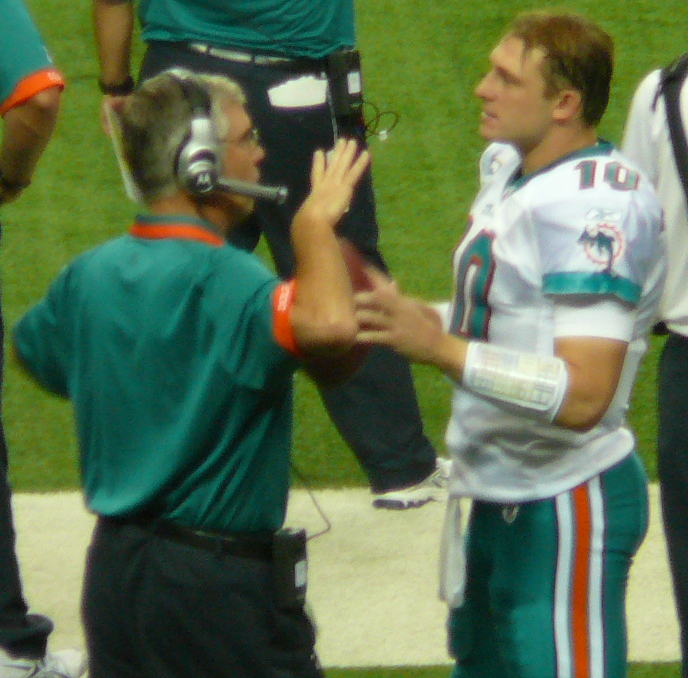
Chad Pennington (right) (2008–2010)

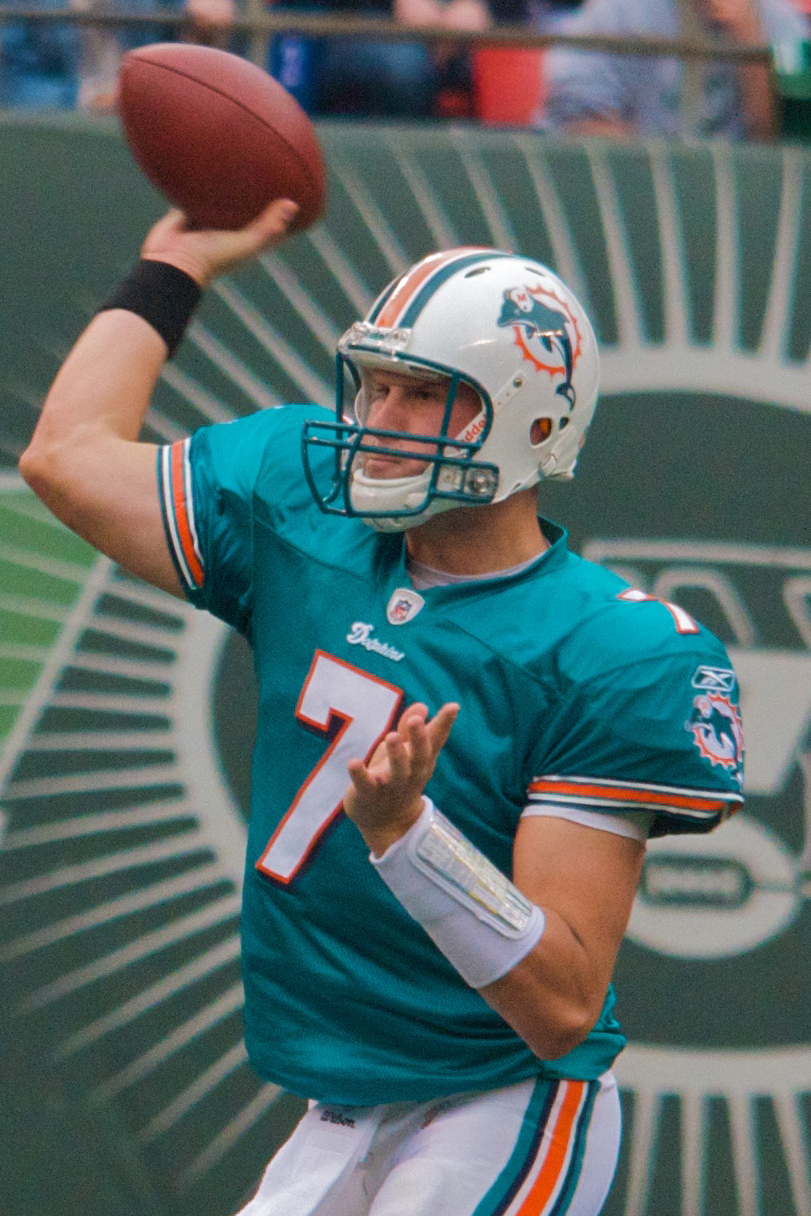
Chad Henne (2009–2011)

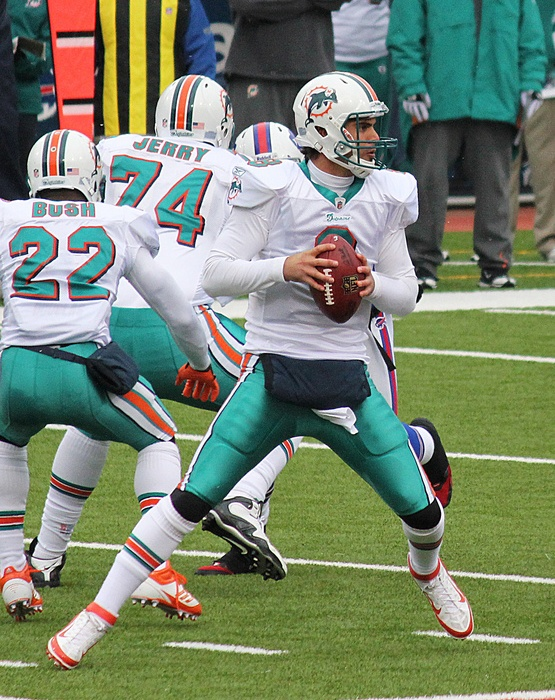
Matt Moore (2011, 2016–2017)

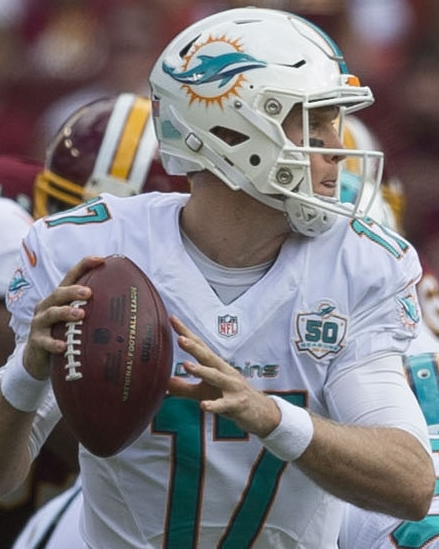
Ryan Tannehill (2012–2016, 2018)

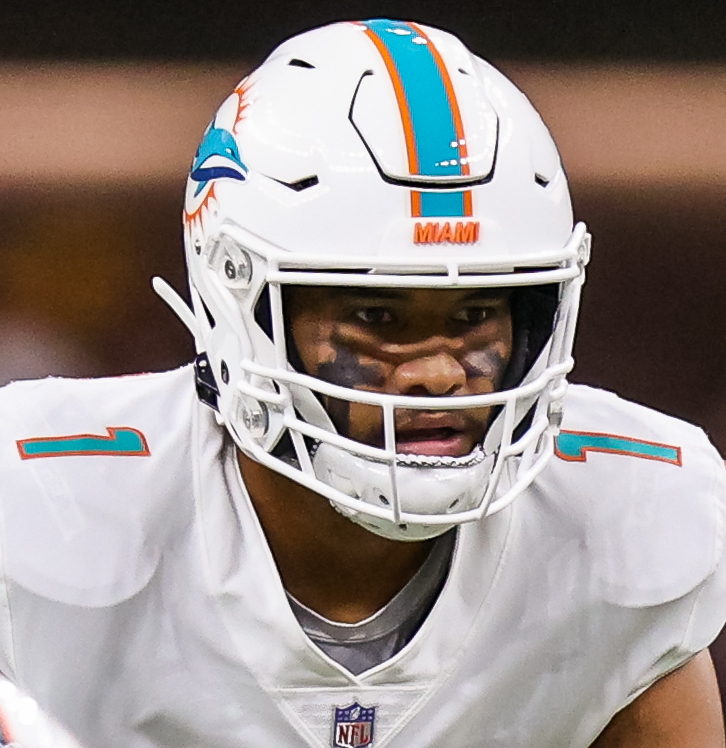
Tua Tagovailoa (2020–2025)

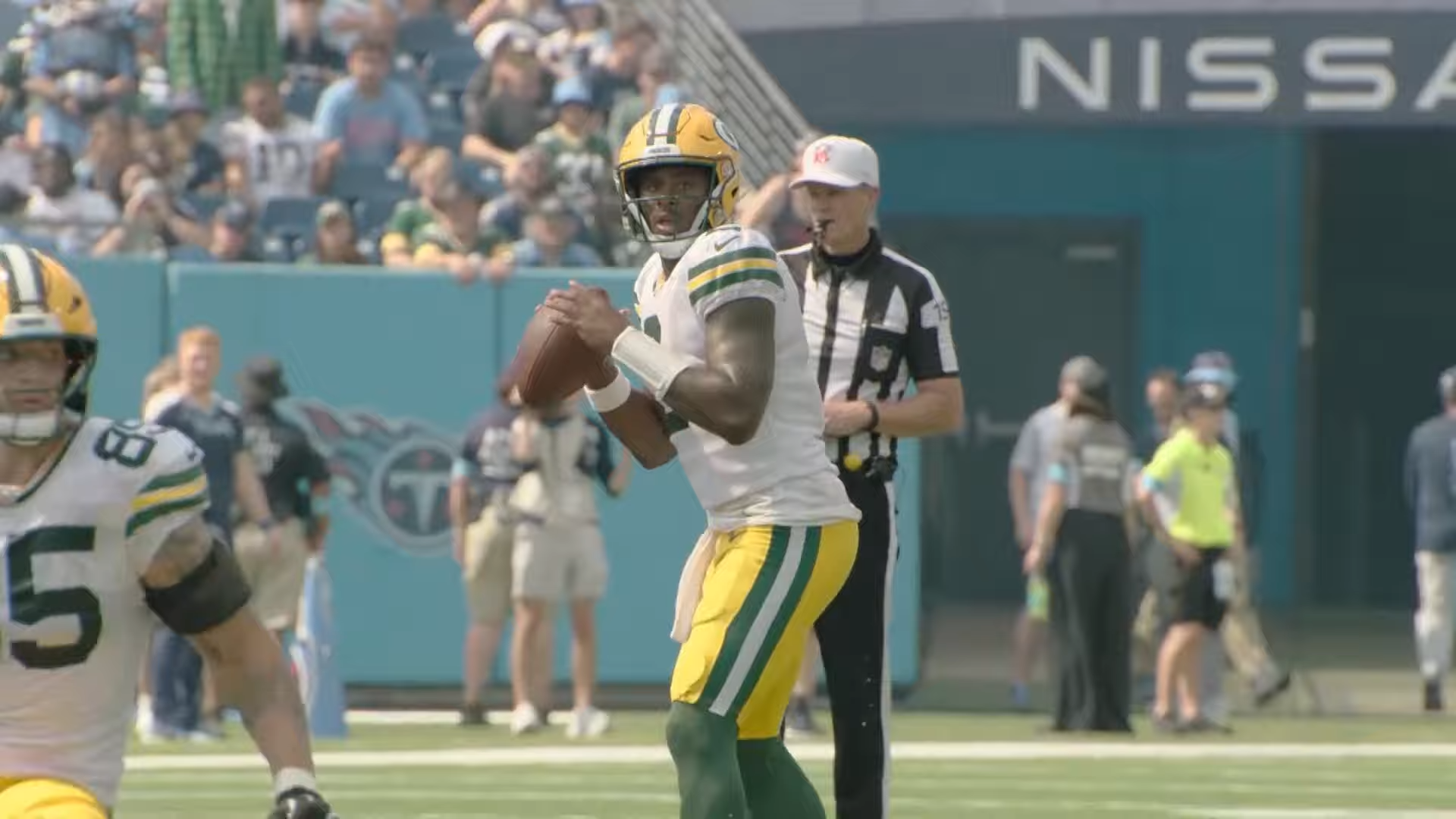
Malik Willis (2026–present)

Quarterbacks listed in order of appearance in each season
Season(s)	Quarterback (Games)				References
1966	Dick Wood (4)	Rick Norton (2)	George Wilson (7)	John Stofa (1)	
1967	John Stofa (1)	Bob Griese^{†} (10)		Rick Norton (3)	
1968	Bob Griese^{†} (13)			Rick Norton (1)	
1969	Bob Griese^{†} (9)			Rick Norton (5)	
1970	Bob Griese^{†} (14)				
1971	Bob Griese^{†} (13)			George Mira (1)	
1972	Bob Griese^{†} (5)	Earl Morrall (9)			
1973	Bob Griese^{†} (13)			Earl Morrall (1)	
1974	Bob Griese^{†} (13)			Earl Morrall (1)	
1975	Bob Griese^{†} (10)		Earl Morrall (1)	Don Strock (3)	
1976	Bob Griese^{†} (13)			Don Strock (1)	
1977	Bob Griese^{†} (14)				
1978	Don Strock (7)		Bob Griese^{†} (9)		
1979	Bob Griese^{†} (12)			Don Strock (4)	
1980	Bob Griese^{†} (3)	Don Strock (2)	David Woodley (11)		
1981	David Woodley (15)			Don Strock (1)	
1982^{[b]}	David Woodley (9)				
1983	David Woodley (5)	Dan Marino^{†} (9)		Don Strock (2)	
1984	Dan Marino^{†} (16)				
1985	Dan Marino^{†} (16)				
1986	Dan Marino^{†} (16)				
1987^{[b]}	Dan Marino^{†} (12)			Kyle Mackey (3)	
1988	Dan Marino^{†} (16)				
1989	Dan Marino^{†} (16)				
1990	Dan Marino^{†} (16)				
1991	Dan Marino^{†} (16)				
1992	Dan Marino^{†} (16)				
1993	Dan Marino^{†} (5)	Scott Mitchell (7)		Steve DeBerg (4)	
1994	Dan Marino^{†} (16)				
1995	Dan Marino^{†} (14)			Bernie Kosar (2)	
1996	Dan Marino^{†} (13)			Craig Erickson (3)	
1997	Dan Marino^{†} (16)				
1998	Dan Marino^{†} (16)				
1999	Dan Marino^{†} (11)			Damon Huard (5)	
2000	Jay Fiedler (15)			Damon Huard (1)	
2001	Jay Fiedler (16)				
2002	Jay Fiedler (10)			Ray Lucas (6)	
2003	Jay Fiedler (11)			Brian Griese (5)	
2004	Jay Fiedler (7)	A. J. Feeley (8)		Sage Rosenfels (1)	
2005	Gus Frerotte (15)			Sage Rosenfels (1)	
2006	Daunte Culpepper (4)	Joey Harrington (11)		Cleo Lemon (1)	
2007	Trent Green (5)	Cleo Lemon (7)		John Beck (4)	
2008	Chad Pennington (16)				
2009	Chad Pennington (3)	Chad Henne (13)			
2010	Chad Henne (14)		Tyler Thigpen (1)	Chad Pennington (1)	
2011	Chad Henne (4)	Matt Moore (12)			
2012	Ryan Tannehill (16)				
2013	Ryan Tannehill (16)				
2014	Ryan Tannehill (16)				
2015	Ryan Tannehill (16)				
2016	Ryan Tannehill (13)			Matt Moore (3)	
2017	Jay Cutler (14)			Matt Moore (2)	
2018	Ryan Tannehill (11)			Brock Osweiler (5)	
2019	Ryan Fitzpatrick (13)			Josh Rosen (3)	
2020	Ryan Fitzpatrick (7)		Tua Tagovailoa (9)		
2021	Tua Tagovailoa (12)		Jacoby Brissett (5)		
2022	Tua Tagovailoa (13)		Teddy Bridgewater (2)	Skylar Thompson (2)	
2023	Tua Tagovailoa (17)				
2024	Tua Tagovailoa (11)		Skylar Thompson (1)	Tyler Huntley (5)	
2025	Tua Tagovailoa (14)			Quinn Ewers (3)	
2026	Malik Willis (8)			Kyle McCord (1)	

==== Regular season stats ====
Stats through the 2026 season week 10

Click on heading to sort

Quarterback	Games	Wins	Losses	Ties	Win %
John Beck	4	0	4	—	.000
Teddy Bridgewater	2	0	2	—	.000
Jacoby Brissett	5	2	3	—	.400
Daunte Culpepper	4	1	3	—	.250
Jay Cutler	14	6	8	—	.429
Steve DeBerg	4	2	2	—	.500
Craig Erickson	3	1	2	—	.333
Quinn Ewers	3	1	2	—	.333
A. J. Feeley	8	3	5	—	.375
Jay Fiedler	59	36	23	—	.610
Ryan Fitzpatrick	20	9	11	—	.450
Gus Frerotte	15	9	6	—	.600
Trent Green	5	0	5	—	.000
Bob Griese	151	92	56	3	.619
Brian Griese	5	3	2	—	.600
Joey Harrington	11	5	6	—	.455
Chad Henne	31	13	18	—	.419
Damon Huard	6	5	1	—	.833
Tyler Huntley	5	2	3	—	.400
Bernie Kosar	2	0	2	—	.000
Cleo Lemon	8	1	7	—	.125
Ray Lucas	6	2	4	—	.333
Kyle Mackey	3	1	2	—	.333
Kyle McCord	1	0	1	—	.000
Dan Marino	240	147	93	—	.613
George Mira	1	1	0	—	1.000
Scott Mitchell	7	3	4	—	.429
Matt Moore	17	8	9	—	.471
Earl Morrall	12	11	1	—	.917
Rick Norton	11	1	10	—	.091
Brock Osweiler	5	2	3	—	.400
Chad Pennington	20	12	8	—	.600
Josh Rosen	3	0	3	—	.000
Sage Rosenfels	2	0	2	—	.000
John Stofa	2	2	0	—	1.000
Don Strock	20	14	6	—	.700
Tua Tagovailoa	77	44	33	—	.571
Ryan Tannehill	88	42	46	—	.477
Tyler Thigpen	1	0	1	—	.000
Skylar Thompson	3	1	2	—	.333
Malik Willis	8	1	7	—	.125
George Wilson	7	2	5	—	.286
Dick Wood	4	0	4	.000	
David Woodley	40	27	12	1	.688
Totals	942	512	426	4	.546

=== Postseason ===
==== Postseason stats ====
Quarterback	Games	Wins	Losses	Ref.
Jay Fiedler	3	1	2	
Bob Griese	11	6	5	
Dan Marino	18	8	10	
Matt Moore	1	0	1	
Earl Morrall	2	2	0	
Chad Pennington	1	0	1	
Tua Tagovailoa	1	0	1	
Skylar Thompson	1	0	1	
David Woodley	5	3	2	
Totals	43	20	23	.476

==== Postseason games ====
Quarterback	Season	Game	Opponent	Score	Win %	Ref
Bob Griese	1970	Divisional	Oakland	14–21	.545	
Bob Griese	1971	Divisional	Kansas City	27–24 OT2	.545	
Bob Griese	1971	AFC Championship	Balt. Colts	21–0	.545	
Bob Griese	1971	Super Bowl VI	Dallas	3–24	.545	
Bob Griese	1972	Super Bowl VII	Washington	14–7	.545	
Bob Griese	1973	Divisional	Cincinnati	34–16	.545	
Bob Griese	1973	AFC Championship	Oakland	27–10	.545	
Bob Griese	1973	Super Bowl VIII	Minnesota	24–7	.545	
Bob Griese	1974	Divisional	Oakland	26–28	.545	
Bob Griese	1978	Divisional	Houston Oilers	9–17	.545	
Bob Griese	1979	Divisional	Pittsburgh	14–34	.545	
Earl Morrall	1972	Divisional	Cleveland	20–14	1.000	
Earl Morrall	1972	AFC Championship	Pittsburgh	21–17	1.000	
David Woodley	1981	Divisional	San Diego	38–41 OT	.600	
David Woodley	1982	First Round	New England	28–13	.600	
David Woodley	1982	Second Round	San Diego	34–13	.600	
David Woodley	1982	AFC Championship	New York Jets	14–0	.600	
David Woodley	1982	Super Bowl XVII	Washington	17–27	.600	
Dan Marino	1983	Divisional	Seattle	20–27	.444	
Dan Marino	1984	Divisional	Seattle	31–10	.444	
Dan Marino	1984	AFC Championship	Pittsburgh	45–28	.444	
Dan Marino	1984	Super Bowl XIX	San Francisco	16–38	.444	
Dan Marino	1985	Divisional	Cleveland	24–21	.444	
Dan Marino	1985	AFC Championship	New England	14–31	.444	
Dan Marino	1990	Wild Card	Kansas City	17–16	.444	
Dan Marino	1990	Divisional	Buffalo	34–44	.444	
Dan Marino	1992	Divisional	San Diego	31–0	.444	
Dan Marino	1992	AFC Championship	Buffalo	10–29	.444	
Dan Marino	1994	Wild Card	Kansas City	27–17	.444	
Dan Marino	1994	Divisional	San Diego	21–22	.444	
Dan Marino	1995	Wild Card	Buffalo	22–37	.444	
Dan Marino	1997	Wild Card	New England	3–17	.444	
Dan Marino	1998	Wild Card	Buffalo	24–17	.444	
Dan Marino	1998	Divisional	Denver	3–38	.444	
Dan Marino	1999	Wild Card	Seattle	20–17	.444	
Dan Marino	1999	Divisional	Jacksonville	7–62	.444	
Jay Fiedler	2000	Wild Card	Indianapolis	23–17 OT	.333	
Jay Fiedler	2000	Divisional	Oakland	0–27	.333	
Jay Fiedler	2001	Wild Card	Balt. Ravens	3–20	.333	
Chad Pennington	2008	Wild Card	Balt. Ravens	9–27	.000	
Matt Moore	2016	Wild Card	Pittsburgh	12–30	.000	
Skylar Thompson	2022	Wild Card	Buffalo	31–34	.000	
Tua Tagovailoa	2023	Wild Card	Kansas City	7–26	.000	

== Team career passing records ==
Through the 2025 NFL Season

Name	Comp	Att	%	Yds	TD	Int
Dan Marino	4,967	8,358	59.4	61,361	420	252
Bob Griese	1,926	3,429	56.2	25,092	192	172
Ryan Tannehill	1,829	2,911	62.8	20,434	123	75
Tua Tagovailoa	1,647	2,421	68.0	18,166	120	59
Jay Fiedler	936	1,603	58.4	11,040	66	63

== See also ==
- Lists of NFL starting quarterbacks

== Notes ==
- ^{a} : In each game, a team picks one player to start in the quarterback (QB) position. Players may be substituted during the game, but the term "starting quarterback" refers to the player who started the game in that position.
- ^{b} : Strikes by the National Football League Players Association in the 1982 and 1987 seasons resulted in shortened seasons (9- and 15-game schedules, respectively).
