= George Wilson (quarterback) =

American football player (1943–2011)

No. 10, 48, 15
- Position: Quarterback

Personal information
- Born: May 29, 1943; Oak Park, Illinois, U.S.
- Died: August 6, 2011 (aged 68); Weeki Wachee, Florida, U.S.
- Listed height: 6 ft 2 in (1.88 m)
- Listed weight: 185 lb (84 kg)

Career information
- High school: Sacred Heart (Dearborn, Michigan)
- College: Notre Dame; Xavier (1963-1965)
- NFL draft: 1965: 20th round, 277th overall pick
- AFL draft: 1965: 12th round, 96th overall pick

Career history
- Detroit Lions (1965)*; Buffalo Bills (1965); Miami Dolphins (1966); Denver Broncos (1967)*; Pottstown Firebirds (1968)
- * Offseason or practice squad member only

Career AFL statistics
- Passing attempts: 112
- Passing completions: 46
- Completion percentage: 41.1%
- TD–INT: 5–10
- Passing yards: 764
- Passer rating: 42.4
- Stats at Pro Football Reference

George William Wilson Jr. (May 29, 1943 – August 6, 2011) was an American professional football player. He played college football at Xavier University and for the American Football League's (AFL) 1966 expansion team, the Miami Dolphins. In 1965, Wilson was selected in the 20th round of the National Football League (NFL) draft by the Detroit Lions, with the 277th overall pick. However, he eventually signed with the AFL's Buffalo Bills, who selected him as the 96th pick in the 12th round of the Red Shirt draft. In 1966, Wilson was traded to the Miami Dolphins in exchange for a 13th round 1967 draft pick. At the time, the Dolphins' head coach was his father, George Wilson Sr.

During his only season in Miami, George Wilson Jr. shared starting quarterback duties with Rick Norton, John Stofa, and Dick Wood. On October 16, 1966, Wilson led the Miami Dolphins to their first win, defeating the Denver Broncos by a score of 24–7. He played all 14 games, starting in 7 of them. Wilson compiled a win–loss record of 2–5 when starting. Wilson's season stats included completing 41.1% of his passes – 46 out of 112 pass attempts – for a total of 764 yards. Although he threw five touchdown passes, Wilson was intercepted ten times. Additionally, Wilson rushed 137 yards on 27 attempts. He received an unimpressive passer rating of 42.4.

Prior to the 1967 season, Wilson, along with Earl Faison, Cookie Gilchrist, and Ernie Park, were traded to the Broncos in exchange for Abner Haynes, Jerry Hopkins, Dan LaRose, and a draft pick. However, he was cut from the Broncos on July 15, 1967, after practicing for less than a week. Wilson became a free agent and signed with the Canadian Football League's Toronto Argonauts on April 23, 1968, before being cut by the team in the following months. By August 1968, he joined the Pottstown Firebirds of the Atlantic Coast Football League, a minor football league. However, Wilson quit the Firebirds on September 10, citing "personal reasons".

Wilson died of throat cancer in Weeki Wachee, Florida, on August 6, 2011.

== See also ==
- List of American Football League players
