= List of Miami Dolphins first-round draft picks =

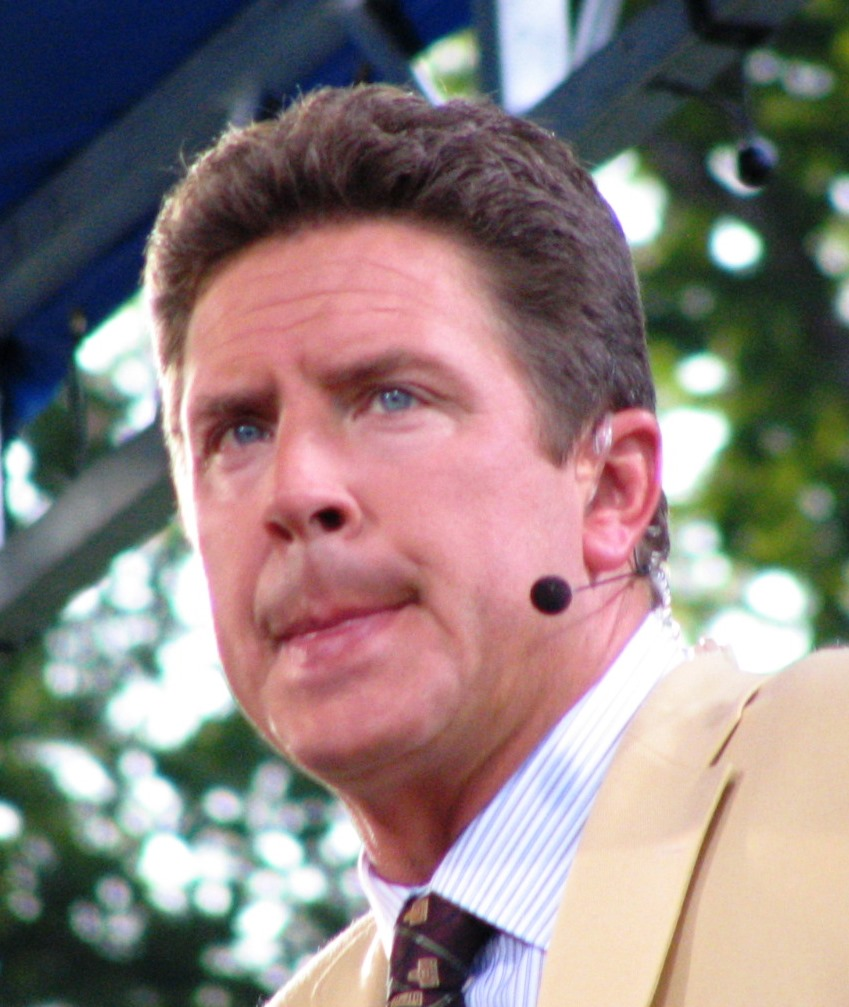
Dan Marino, drafted by the Dolphins in 1983, became a Hall of Famer in 2005.

The Miami Dolphins, a professional American football team based in Miami, Florida, are part of the Eastern Division of the American Football Conference (AFC) in the National Football League (NFL). The Dolphins were founded by Joseph Robbie and Danny Thomas in 1965. They began playing in the American Football League (AFL) as an expansion team in 1966 and joined the NFL as part of the AFL–NFL merger in 1967.

They first participated in the 1966 AFL Annual Player Selection Meeting, more commonly known as the NFL draft. In the annual NFL Draft, each franchise seeks to add new players to its roster. Teams are ranked in reverse order based on the previous season's record, with the worst record picking first, the second worst picking second and so on. The two exceptions to this order are made for teams that appeared in the previous Super Bowl; the Super Bowl champion always picks 32nd, and the Super Bowl loser always picks 31st. Teams have the option of trading away their picks to other teams for different picks, players, cash, or a combination thereof. Thus, it is not uncommon for a team's actual draft pick to differ from their assigned draft pick, or for a team to have extra or no draft picks in any round due to these trades.

As an expansion team in the AFL, the Dolphins were granted the first two picks in the 1966 American Football League Draft. They selected Jim Grabowski and Rick Norton with the first and second picks, respectively. The Dolphins' first selection as an NFL team was Bob Griese, a quarterback from Purdue. The team's most recent first-round selections were Kadyn Proctor, an offensive tackle from Alabama and Chris Johnson, a cornerback from San Diego State in 2026.

== Key ==
Table key
^	Indicates the player was inducted into the Pro Football Hall of Fame.
*	Selected number one overall
—	The Dolphins did not draft a player in the first round that year.
Year	Each year links to an article about that particular AFL or NFL Draft.
Pick	Indicates the number of the pick within the first round
Position	Indicates the position of the player in the NFL
†	Indicates the player was selected for the Pro Bowl
College	The player's college football team

== Player selections ==
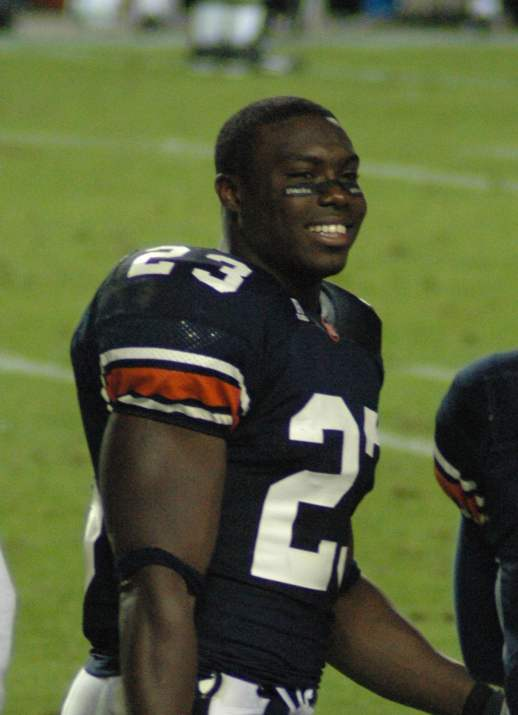
Ronnie Brown was selected in the 2005 NFL Draft.

Miami Dolphins first-round draft picks
Year	Pick	Player name	Position	College	Notes
1966	1	Jim Grabowski *	RB	Illinois	(Note: Grabowski was also selected in the 1st round of the NFL draft by the Packers. He never played for the Dolphins.)
1966	2	Rick Norton	QB	Kentucky	
1967	4	Bob Griese ^	QB	Purdue	
1968	8	Larry Csonka ^	FB	Syracuse	
1968	27	Doug Crusan	OT	Indiana	(Note: On December 27, 1967, the Dolphins traded quarterback John Stofa to the Cincinnati Bengals for first (#27 overall pick) and second-round picks in 1968.)
1969	11	Bill Stanfill †	DE	Georgia	
1970	—	No pick	—	—	(Note: On January 27, 1970, the Dolphins traded their #3 overall pick in the 1970 Draft to the Cleveland Browns for wide receiver Paul Warfield.)
1971	—	No pick	—	—	(Note: On April 13, 1970, the Dolphins sent their #22 overall pick in the 1971 Draft to the Baltimore Colts as compensation for head coach Don Shula.)
1972	25	Mike Kadish	DT	Notre Dame	
1973	—	No pick	—	—	(Note: On June 7, 1972, the Dolphins traded their #26 overall pick in the 1973 Draft to the Buffalo Bills for wide receiver Marlin Briscoe.)
1974	26	Don Reese	DE	Jackson State	
1975	23	Darryl Carlton	OT	Tampa	
1976	17	Larry Gordon	LB	Arizona State	(Note: On January 25, 1974, the Dolphins traded quarterback Joe Theismann to the Washington Redskins for the #17 overall pick in the 1976 Draft.)
1976	19	Kim Bokamper †	LB	San Jose State	
1977	13	A. J. Duhe †	DE	Louisiana State	
1978	—	No pick	—	—	(Note: On April 17, 1978, the Dolphins traded safety Vern Roberson, wide receiver Freddie Solomon, and first (#24 overall pick) and fifth-round picks in 1978 to the San Francisco 49ers for running back Delvin Williams.)
1979	24	Jon Giesler	OT	Michigan	
1980	21	Don McNeal	DB	Alabama	
1981	13	David Overstreet	RB	Oklahoma	
1982	24	Roy Foster †	G	USC	
1983	27	Dan Marino ^	QB	Pittsburgh	
1984	14	Jackie Shipp	LB	Oklahoma	(Note: On May 1, 1984, the Dolphins traded their #26 pick along with two third-round picks in 1984 to the Buffalo Bills for the #14 overall pick.)
1985	27	Lorenzo Hampton	RB	Florida	
1986	—	No pick	—	—	(Note: On October 9, 1985, the Dolphins traded their first (#25 overall pick) and second-round picks to the Tampa Bay Buccaneers for linebacker Hugh Green.)
1987	16	John Bosa	DE	Boston College	(Note: On April 28, 1987, the Dolphins traded their #14 overall pick to the Minnesota Vikings for the first (#16 overall pick) and fifth-round picks.)
1988	16	Eric Kumerow	DE	Ohio State	
1989	9	Sammie Smith	RB	Florida State	
1989	25	Louis Oliver	S	Florida	(Note: On April 2, 1989, the Dolphins traded their second and third-round picks to the Chicago Bears for the #25 overall pick.)
1990	9	Richmond Webb †	OT	Texas A&M	
1991	23	Randal Hill	WR	Miami (FL)	
1992	7	Troy Vincent †	DB	Wisconsin	(Note: On September 3, 1991, the Dolphins traded wide receiver Randal Hill to the Phoenix Cardinals for the #7 overall pick.)
1992	12	Marco Coleman	LB	Georgia Tech	
1993	25	O. J. McDuffie	WR	Penn State	
1994	20	Tim Bowens †	DT	Mississippi	(Note: On April 24, 1994, the Dolphins traded their #16 overall pick to the Green Bay Packers for the first (#20 overall pick) and third-round picks.)
1995	25	Billy Milner	OT	Houston	
1996	20	Daryl Gardener	DT	Baylor	
1997	15	Yatil Green	WR	Miami (FL)	
1998	29	John Avery	RB	Mississippi	(Note: On April 18, 1998, the Dolphins traded their #19 overall pick to the Green Bay Packers for the first (#29 overall pick) and second-round picks.)
1999	—	No pick	—	—	(Note: On April 17, 1999, the Dolphins traded their #24 overall pick in 1999 to the San Francisco 49ers for the first (#27 overall pick) and fifth-round picks. On the same day, the Dolphins traded the #27 overall pick to the Detroit Lions for the second, third, and fifth-round picks.)
2000	—	No pick	—	—	(Note: On April 16, 1998, the Dolphins traded their #23 overall pick in the 2000 Draft to the Carolina Panthers for the second-round pick in the 1998 Draft.)
2001	26	Jamar Fletcher	DB	Wisconsin	
2002	—	No pick	—	—	(Note: On March 8, 2002, the Dolphins traded their #25 overall pick and fourth-round pick in the 2002 Draft along with the #18 overall pick in the 2003 Draft to the New Orleans Saints for running back Ricky Williams and fourth-round pick in the 2002 Draft.)
2003	—	No pick	—	—	(Note: On March 8, 2002, the Dolphins traded their #25 overall pick and fourth-round pick in the 2002 Draft along with the #18 overall pick in the 2003 Draft to the New Orleans Saints for running back Ricky Williams and fourth-round pick in the 2002 Draft.)
2004	19	Vernon Carey	OT	Miami (FL)	(Note: On April 24, 2004, the Dolphins traded their #20 overall pick along with fourth-round pick to the Minnesota Vikings for the #19 overall pick.)
2005	2	Ronnie Brown †	RB	Auburn	
2006	16	Jason Allen	DB	Tennessee	
2007	9	Ted Ginn Jr.	WR	Ohio State	
2008	1	Jake Long * †	OT	Michigan	
2009	25	Vontae Davis †	CB	Illinois	
2010	28	Jared Odrick	DT	Penn State	(Note: On April 22, 2010, the Dolphins traded their #12 overall pick, a fourth-round selection (110th overall), and a sixth-round selection (173rd overall) to the Chargers for the #28 overall pick, a second-round selection (40th overall), a fourth-round selection (126th overall), and a linebacker Tim Dobbins.)
2011	15	Mike Pouncey †	C	Florida	
2012	8	Ryan Tannehill †	QB	Texas A&M	
2013	3	Dion Jordan	DE	Oregon	(Note: On April 25, 2013, the Dolphins traded their #12 overall pick to the Oakland Raiders for the #3 overall pick and second-round pick.)
2014	19	Ja'Wuan James	OT	Tennessee	
2015	14	DeVante Parker	WR	Louisville	
2016	13	Laremy Tunsil †	T	Mississippi	(Note: On March 9, 2016, the Dolphins traded their #8 overall pick to the Philadelphia Eagles for the #13 overall pick, linebacker Kiko Alonso, and cornerback Byron Maxwell.)
2017	22	Charles Harris	DE	Missouri	
2018	11	Minkah Fitzpatrick †	S	Alabama	
2019	13	Christian Wilkins	DT	Clemson	
2020	5	Tua Tagovailoa †	QB	Alabama	
2020	18	Austin Jackson	OT	USC	
2020	30	Noah Igbinoghene	CB	Auburn	(Note: On April 24, 2020, the Dolphins traded their #26 overall pick to the Green Bay Packers for the #30 overall pick and a fourth-round pick.)
2021	6	Jaylen Waddle	WR	Alabama	
2021	18	Jaelan Phillips	DE	Miami (FL)	
2022	—	No pick	—	—	(Note: Miami traded its 2022 first-round selection as well as 2021 first- and fourth-round selections (12th and 123rd overall) for Philadelphia’s 2021 first- and fifth-round selections (6th and 156th overall).)
2023	—	No pick	—	—	(Note: The Dolphins forfeited their first-round selection as punishment for multiple violations of the league's anti-tampering policy in conversations with quarterback Tom Brady and Don Yee, the agent for then-New Orleans Saints coach Sean Payton (as well as for Brady).)
2024	21	Chop Robinson	DE	Penn State	
2025	13	Kenneth Grant	DT	Michigan	
2026	12	Kadyn Proctor	OT	Alabama	
2026	27	Chris Johnson	CB	San Diego State	
