= Jimmy Warren =

American football player (1939–2006)

No. 49, 20
- Position: Cornerback

Personal information
- Born: July 20, 1939; Ferriday, Louisiana, U.S.
- Died: August 9, 2006 (aged 67)

Career information
- College: Illinois
- NFL draft: 1964: undrafted

Career history
- San Diego Chargers (1964–1965); Miami Dolphins (1966–1969); Oakland Raiders (1970–1974, 1977)

Awards and highlights
- AFL All-Star (1966)
- Stats at Pro Football Reference

James Davis "Country" Warren (July 20, 1939 – August 9, 2006) was a collegiate halfback and professional football cornerback who played twelve seasons with the American Football League's (AFL) San Diego Chargers and Miami Dolphins and the National Football League's (NFL) Oakland Raiders.

== Early life ==
Warren was born on July 29, 1939, in Ferriday, Louisiana. He attended Walter L. Cohen High School, in New Orleans, where he was an outstanding player on the school's football team.

== College career ==
Warren attended the University of Illinois, where he was a running back on the football team in 1962 and 1963. As a junior in 1962, he rushed for 100 yards in 57 carries, with 18 receptions for 230 yards and one touchdown. The following year, he rushed for 105 yards on 41 carries with two touchdowns; and had 121 yards on 10 catches with another touchdown. As a senior halfback, he was part of its 1963 Big Ten championship team. In the Rose Bowl against the Washington Huskies that season, he took a pitch-out and scored a 2-yard touchdown that gave the Illini a 10–7 lead in the third quarter. The play proved to be the game-winner in a 17–7 triumph.

His Illini Rose Bowl teammates included, among others, future Pro Football Hall of Fame linebacker Dick Butkus, future AFL and NFL quarterback Mike Taliaferro, future NFL running back Jim Grabowksi and future NFL linebacker Ron Acks.

== Professional career ==
=== San Diego Chargers ===
Warren was not chosen in the 1964 AFL and NFL drafts. At 5 ft 10½ in (1.79 m) and 173 lb. (78.5 kg) he generally was considered too small for professional football. The reigning AFL champion San Diego Chargers, led by future Hall of Fame coach and general manager Sid Gillman, signed Warren as a free agent in 1964. Warren made the team as a defensive back. He started 11 games at left cornerback, with two interceptions on the season. He also returned 13 kickoffs for 353 yards (27.2 yards per return). The Chargers played the Buffalo Bills in the 1964 AFL Championship Game, losing 20-7. Warren started the game at left cornerback and had one kickoff return for 28 yards.

Warren started 11 games the following season at left cornerback. He had five interceptions, tied for ninth best in the AFL. The Chargers went to the AFL Championship Game again facing the Buffalo Bills, losing 23–0. Warren started at left cornerback, and had an interception.

=== Miami Dolphins ===
Despite two productive seasons, the Chargers left Warren exposed in the 1966 expansion draft, which made players available for selection by the newly created Miami Dolphins for their inaugural season. The Dolphins selected Warren, along with Charger teammates Dave Kocourek, Ernie Park and Dick Westmoreland. That season would be the best of his professional career. Warren started all 14 games at left cornerback, with Westmoreland at right cornerback. Warren intercepted five passes for the second consecutive year, and led the AFL in interception return yards (198). In a November game against the Kansas City Chiefs, he returned an interception 70 yards for a touchdown. Warren was selected for the first and only time to play in the AFL All-Star Game.

The Dolphins gave Warren an agreeable salary raise in 1967, after he expressed to the team their initial offer was insufficient. From 1967 to 1969, Warren started 41 out of 42 Dolphins' games at left or right cornerback, principally opposite Westmoreland at right cornerback in 1967-68. He had four interceptions in 1967 and two in 1968. In a December 1967 game against the Boston Patriots, safety Bob Neff recovered a fumble and lateralled it to Warren who scored a touchdown. In 1967 and 1968, Warren received the award as the Dolphins best defensive back.

From 1966 to 1969, the Dolphins were coached by George Wilson. Future Hall of Fame coach Don Shula became the Dolphins head coach before the 1970 season. Shula intended to play more zone defense, and to use younger players, and the 31-year old Warren did not fit within the new coach's plan. Shula waived Warren in mid-September, before the 1970 season started.

=== Oakland Raiders ===
Warren was out of professional football in 1970, working in a Miami department store, when he was signed by the Oakland Raiders on October 13, after star cornerback Willie Brown was injured and required surgery. Warren played 10 games as a reserve defensive back in 1970. Raiders coach John Madden said at the time "'It's amazing a player of his caliber was available when Willie Brown got hurt . ... Corners are at such a premium and he was the best cover man Miami had'".

In a November 15, 1970 win over the Denver Broncos, 24–19, Warren came into the game after the second play when starting cornerback Kent McCloughlin was injured. Warren had two interceptions, batted away five passes and had a number of tackles. Warren's new teammates awarded him the game ball. Warren played his final six seasons with the Raiders (1970–74, 1977), mostly as a reserve defensive back. He appeared in 57 regular games, starting six, with seven interceptions and two fumble recoveries. He also appeared in seven playoff games.

In 1971, Warren started one game and intercepted two passes. He returned both interceptions for touchdowns. On October 10, he returned an interception 55 yards for a touchdown against Steve Ramsay and the Denver Broncos, securing a 27–16 Raiders win. He teammates awarded him the game ball. In a November 14 game against the Houston Oilers, Warren intercepted a Dan Pastorini pass and returned it 59 yards for a touchdown.

Warren was out of football in 1975 and 1976. The Raiders signed him in December 1977, when safety George Atkinson was injured. The 38-year old Warren had not played since training camp in 1975. He appeared in two regular season games and one playoff game, before finally ending his career.

He concluded his career with 25 interceptions, three fumble recoveries and four touchdowns in 140 games.

== Coaching career ==
After his retirement as a player, Warren's first coaching job was as an assistant coach to Walter Highsmith at Edison High School in Miami. Warren coached at his alma mater Cohen College Prep High School in Uptown New Orleans. Its football team advanced to the district playoffs for the first time in 25 years under his tutelage.

In professional football, Warren was a defensive backfield coach with the Orlando Renegades of the United States Football League (USFL) (1985) and the Los Angeles Raiders (1988). He also served as a scout for the Raiders. As a college coach, in 1983, Warren joined the staff of head coach Larry Little at Bethune-Cookman College (B-CC), serving as an assistant head coach and defensive backfield coach. Little was a former Dolphin teammate (1969) and Pro Football Hall of Fame player. Warren coached in the same capacity at B-CC in 1984, before going to the USFL. After his stint coaching in the USFL, in 1987 Warren returned to B-CC as an assistant head coach with responsibility for the defensive line.

In 1991, Warren coached the defensive secondary at Long Beach State University, under former teammate Willie Brown; but the school ended its football program before the 1992 season. In early 1992, the University of Houston hired Warren as a defensive backfield coach. He had considerable experience in coaching man-to-man coverage.

== Honors ==
In 1994, Warren was inducted into the Greater New Orleans Sports Hall of Fame.

== Personal life ==
Warren taught sixth grade for two years in New Orleans, before joining the coaching staff at Long Beach State.

== Death ==
He died on August 9, 2006, at 67 years of age.

== See also ==
- Other American Football League players
