= Jay Fiedler =

American football player (born 1971)

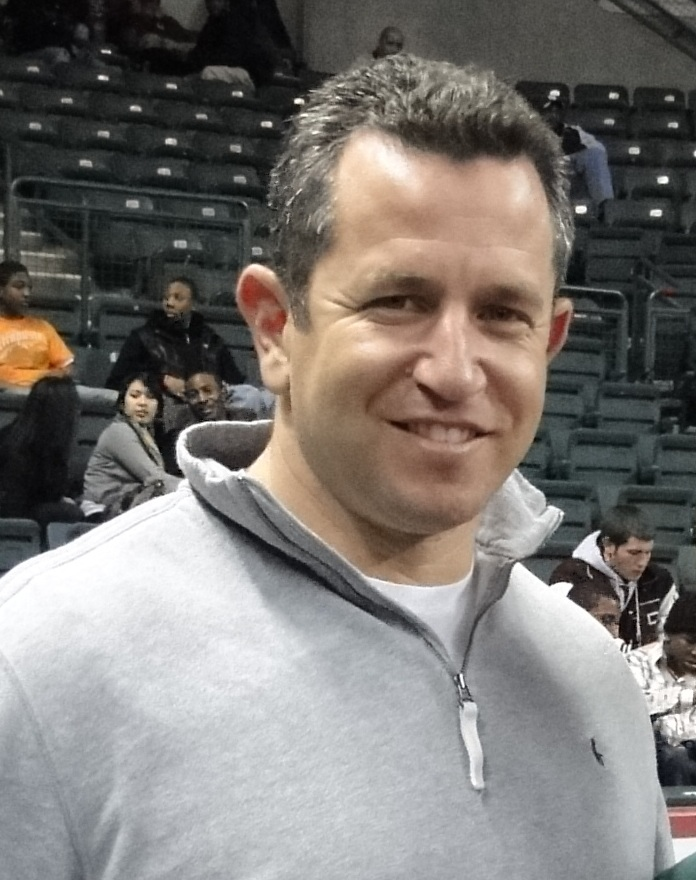
- Fiedler in 2010

No. 11, 9
- Position: Quarterback

Personal information
- Born: December 29, 1971 (age 54); Oceanside, New York, U.S.
- Listed height: 6 ft 1 in (1.85 m)
- Listed weight: 215 lb (98 kg)

Career information
- High school: Oceanside
- College: Dartmouth (1990–1993)
- NFL draft: 1994: undrafted

Career history
- Philadelphia Eagles (1994–1995); Cincinnati Bengals (1996)*; Amsterdam Admirals (1997); Minnesota Vikings (1998); Jacksonville Jaguars (1999); Miami Dolphins (2000–2004); New York Jets (2005); Tampa Bay Buccaneers (2006)*
- * Offseason or practice squad member only

Awards and highlights
- Nils V. "Swede" Nelson Award (1992); Ivy League Rookie of the Year (1991); 2× First-team All-Ivy League (1992, 1993); Second-team All-Ivy League (1991); Ivy Bowl MVP (1994); National Jewish Museum Sports Hall of Fame (2002)

Career NFL statistics
- Passing attempts: 1,717
- Passing completions: 1,008
- Completion percentage: 58.7%
- TD–INT: 69–66
- Passing yards: 11,844
- Passer rating: 77.1
- Stats at Pro Football Reference

Jay Brian Fiedler (born December 29, 1971) is an American former professional football player who was a quarterback in the National Football League (NFL). He played college football for the Dartmouth Big Green. He played 76 games at quarterback in the NFL, starting 60, and threw 69 touchdowns. He was inducted into the National Jewish Museum Sports Hall of Fame in 2002.

== Early life ==
Fiedler is Jewish, and was born to a Jewish family on Long Island in Oceanside, New York. He is a distant relative of Arthur Fiedler, the long-time conductor of the Boston Pops Orchestra.

Fiedler attended Oceanside High School in Oceanside, New York, and won varsity letters as a quarterback in football, a point guard in basketball, and as a decathlete in track and field.

== College career ==
He is an alumnus of Dartmouth College, where he was a member of Beta Theta Pi fraternity. In football, Fiedler set school and Ivy League records for touchdown passes (58), passing yards (6,684) and total offense (7,249 yards).

Fiedler was named Co-Offensive Player of the Game in the 1994 East-West Shrine Game. He received a Scholar-Athlete Award from the National Football Foundation and Hall of Fame, the Nils V. "Swede" Nelson Award for sportsmanship, and received his degree in mechanical engineering. He was named the MVP for the 1994 Ivy Bowl in Japan.

== Professional career ==
Pre-draft measurables
Height	Weight	Arm length	Hand span	40-yard dash	10-yard split	20-yard split	20-yard shuttle	Vertical jump
6 ft 1 3/8 in (1.86 m)	215 lb (98 kg)	30 1/2 in (0.77 m)	9 1/2 in (0.24 m)	4.81 s	1.70 s	2.78 s	4.46 s	33.5 in (0.85 m)

Fiedler was viewed as a possible late round draftee in 1994, but doubts over the quality of his opposition at Dartmouth meant he was not chosen. Fiedler would be signed by the Philadelphia Eagles (1994–1995) and have stints with the Minnesota Vikings (1998) and Jacksonville Jaguars (1999) before finding steady work with the Miami Dolphins beginning in 2000. In between his time with the Eagles and Vikings, Fiedler served as a receivers coach at Hofstra University in 1997 before being signed as a free agent by Minnesota in 1998.

Fiedler signed a three-year, $3.8 million contract with the Dolphins in 2000, replacing Dan Marino as starter. He beat out Damon Huard for the starting role.

Fiedler's stint with the Dolphins featured three 10+ win seasons in four years, two 11–5 seasons in 2000 and 2001, an AFC East title, and two postseason appearances including a victory for the Miami Dolphins. During these years, the Dolphins' offense lagged notably behind its defense, which featured perennial Pro Bowlers in cornerbacks Sam Madison and Patrick Surtain, and Pro Football Hall of Famers defensive end Jason Taylor and linebacker Zach Thomas. He is the last Miami Dolphins quarterback to win a playoff game, winning the 2000 AFC wild card game, 23–17 in overtime, versus the Indianapolis Colts on December 30, 2000, at Pro Player Stadium. As of 2026, it remains the last postseason win for the Dolphins. In 2004, Fiedler was benched after week 1 in favor of A.J. Feeley, but was brought back as starter after Feeley struggled.

Fiedler signed with the Jets as an unrestricted free agent on March 11, 2005, as a backup quarterback to Chad Pennington. On September 25, 2005, in a game against his former team the Jaguars, Fiedler was pressed into action when Pennington suffered what would prove to be a season-ending rotator cuff tear. Fiedler would himself suffer a severe shoulder injury during the game and was also sidelined for the remainder of the 2005 season.

Fiedler was released by the Jets on February 22, 2006. On June 29, he signed with the Tampa Bay Buccaneers to serve as backup to Chris Simms. Fiedler was released during the first wave of cuts in August due to a nagging shoulder issue that made him unable to practice.

Fiedler sat out 2006 rehabilitating his throwing shoulder following his release from Tampa Bay.

Fiedler was set to work out for the Falcons in April 2007, according to his agent Bryan Levy. In addition, the Giants considered signing him but eventually signed Anthony Wright instead.

He last played in 2008 due to his shoulder injuries.

Fiedler played in 76 games with 60 starts and is a 58.7 percent career passer. He threw for 69 touchdowns and 66 interceptions in his career, with 11,844 passing yards.

== NFL career statistics ==
Legend
	Led the league
**Bold**	Career high

=== Regular season ===
Year	Team	Games			Passing									Rushing					Sacks		Fumbles	
Year	Team	GP	GS	Record	Cmp	Att	Pct	Yds	Avg	Lng	TD	Int	Rtg	Att	Yds	Avg	Lng	TD	Sck	SckY	Fum	Lost
1995	PHI	0	0	–	DNP																	
1998	MIN	5	0	–	3	7	42.9	41	5.9	19	0	1	22.6	4	-6	-1.5	-1	0	0	0	0	0
1999	JAX	7	1	**1–0**	61	94	**64.9**	656	7.0	25	2	2	83.5	13	26	2.0	15	0	7	47	1	0
2000	MIA	15	15	10–5	204	357	57.1	2,402	6.7	61	14	14	74.5	54	267	**4.9**	**30**	1	23	129	2	2
2001	MIA	**16**	**16**	11–5	**273**	**450**	60.7	**3,290**	7.3	**74**	**20**	**19**	80.3	**73**	**321**	4.4	26	**4**	**27**	**178**	6	**4**
2002	MIA	11	10	7–3	179	292	61.3	2,024	6.9	59	14	9	85.2	28	99	3.5	12	3	13	89	3	1
2003	MIA	12	11	7–4	179	314	57.0	2,138	6.8	59	11	13	72.4	34	88	2.6	14	3	19	126	7	**4**
2004	MIA	8	7	1–6	101	190	53.2	1,186	6.2	71	7	8	67.1	12	59	4.9	26	0	25	165	**9**	**4**
2005	NYJ	2	0	–	8	13	61.5	107	**8.2**	23	1	0	**113.3**	1	0	0.0	0	0	0	0	1	0
Career		76	60	37–23	1,008	1,717	58.7	11,844	6.9	74	69	66	77.1	219	854	3.9	30	11	114	734	29	15

=== Postseason ===
Year	Team	Games			Passing									Rushing					Sacks		Fumbles	
Year	Team	GP	GS	Record	Cmp	Att	Pct	Yds	Avg	Lng	TD	Int	Rtg	Att	Yds	Avg	Lng	TD	Sck	SckY	Fum	Lost
1995	PHI	1	0	–	0	0	—	0	0	0	0	0	—	0	0	0.0	0	0	0	0	0	0
1998	MIN	0	0	–	DNP																	
1999	JAX	1	0	–	7	11	**63.6**	172	**15.6**	**70**	**2**	1	**108.9**	0	0	0.0	0	0	0	0	0	0
2000	MIA	**2**	**2**	**1–1**	**37**	**71**	52.1	361	5.1	33	1	**6**	36.2	**10**	**55**	**5.5**	**11**	0	4	21	0	0
2001	MIA	1	1	0–1	15	28	53.6	122	4.4	20	0	1	50.0	3	16	5.3	8	0	3	17	1	1
Career		5	3	1–2	59	110	53.6	655	6.0	70	3	8	50.4	13	71	5.5	11	0	7	38	1	1

== Outside the NFL ==
In 2007, Fiedler and Demetrius Ford became co-owners of the CBA basketball expansion team East Kentucky Miners based in Pikeville, Kentucky.

In 2008, Fiedler made his pro volleyball debut.

Fiedler, who is Jewish, was inducted into the National Jewish Museum Sports Hall of Fame in 2002. At the time of his induction, Fiedler mentioned how strong he is in his faith. Fiedler was one of two active NFL players inducted into the Hall that year, the other being then-Pittsburgh Steelers punter Josh Miller. ESPN personality Chris Berman would also occasionally allude to Fiedler's faith by referring to him as Fiedler on the Roof after performing well in games, even going far as to start singing "If I Were a Rich Man" during highlights.

Fiedler currently owns and operates The Sports Academy at Brookwood Camps and the Prime Time Sports Camps along with his brother Scott. Brookwood is a summer sleep away camp that has been family owned by the Fiedlers since 1986. Prime Time Sports Camps operates various sports camps and clinics throughout the year with Fiedler operating all of the football sessions.

Fiedler spent four months training Rutgers QB Gary Nova for the NFL.

== See also ==
- List of Jews in sports
