= Tom Erlandson (linebacker, born 1966) =

American football player (born 1966)

No. 53
- Position: Linebacker

Personal information
- Born: June 19, 1966 (age 60); Denver, Colorado, U.S.
- Listed height: 6 ft 1 in (1.85 m)
- Listed weight: 220 lb (100 kg)

Career information
- High school: Smoky Hill (Aurora, Colorado)
- College: Washington
- NFL draft: 1988: 12th round, 316th overall pick

Career history
- Buffalo Bills (1988)

Career NFL statistics
- Games played: 4
- Stats at Pro Football Reference

Thomas Dean Erlandson Jr. (born June 19, 1966) is an American former professional football player who was a linebacker for one season in the National Football League (NFL) for the Buffalo Bills. He played college football for the Washington Huskies and was selected in the twelfth round of the 1988 NFL draft.

== College career ==
Erlandson was a three-year letterman at linebacker for Washington from 1985 to 1987.

== Personal life ==
He is the son of Tom Erlandson.
