= Jack Pyburn (offensive lineman) =

American football player (born 1944)

No. 65
- Position: Offensive tackle

Personal information
- Born: December 28, 1944 (age 81); Shreveport, Louisiana, U.S.
- Listed height: 6 ft 6 in (1.98 m)
- Listed weight: 250 lb (113 kg)

Career information
- High school: C. E. Byrd (Shreveport)
- College: Texas A&M
- NFL draft: 1967: 11th round, 266th overall pick

Career history
- Miami Dolphins (1967–1968)

Career NFL statistics
- Games played: 23
- Stats at Pro Football Reference

Jack Harris Pyburn (born December 28, 1944) is an American former professional football player who was an offensive tackle for the Miami Dolphins of the American Football League (AFL) from 1967 to 1968. He played college football for the Texas A&M Aggies.
