= Maxie Williams =

American football player (1940–2009)

No. 78
- Position: Offensive lineman

Personal information
- Born: June 28, 1940; Granite Falls, North Carolina, U.S.
- Died: July 7, 2009 (aged 69); Pittsburgh, Pennsylvania, U.S.
- Listed height: 6 ft 4 in (1.93 m)
- Listed weight: 250 lb (113 kg)

Career information
- High school: Granite Falls (NC)
- College: Southeastern Louisiana
- AFL draft: 1965: 10th round, 74th overall pick

Career history
- Houston Oilers (1965); Miami Dolphins (1966–1970)

Career statistics
- Games played: 83
- Games started: 64
- Stats at Pro Football Reference

Maxie Foy Williams (June 28, 1940 – July 7, 2009) was an American football offensive lineman in the American Football League (AFL) and the National Football League (NFL). He was selected by the Houston Oilers in the 10th round of the 1965 AFL draft and also played for the Miami Dolphins. Williams played college football at Southeastern Louisiana.

== Early life ==
Williams played high school football at Granite Falls High School in Granite Falls, North Carolina. During his junior year, he was a part of the Granite Falls High 1956 North Carolina state champion football team.

== College career ==
After graduating from high school, Williams would serve in the U.S. Army from 1958 to 1961. Following that, he then played college football at Southeastern Louisiana. As an offensive lineman, he was an All-American as a senior, and twice named to the All-Gulf State Conference team. In 1973, Williams was inducted into the Southeastern Louisiana Athletics Hall of Fame. Williams was also a Caldwell County Sports Hall of Fame inductee.

== Professional career ==
Williams was drafted by the Houston Oilers in the 10th round (74th overall) of the 1965 AFL draft. After playing his first season in Houston, Williams was picked up by the Miami Dolphins in the 1966 AFL expansion draft. The 1966 Miami Dolphins season was the team's first season. Williams played his last five seasons of professional football with the Dolphins from 1966 to 1970.
