= Pete Jaquess =

American football player (born 1940)

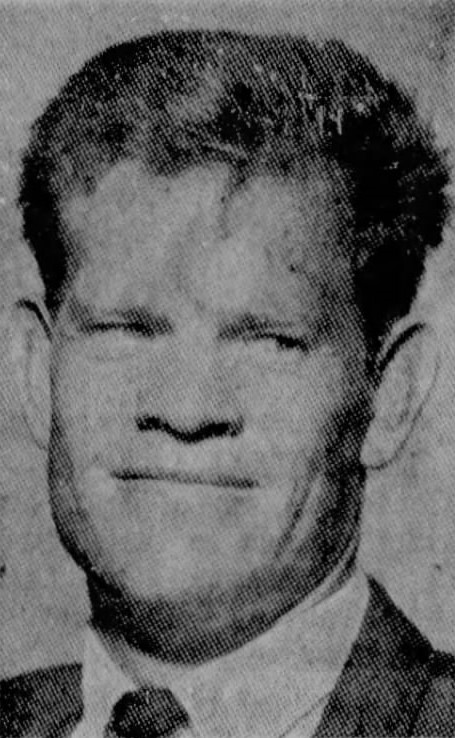
- Pete Jaquess in 1967

No. 47
- Position: Defensive back

Personal information
- Born: December 25, 1940 (age 85); Earth, Texas, U.S.

Career information
- College: Eastern New Mexico
- AFL draft: 1964: 20th round, 158th overall pick

Career history
- Houston Oilers (1964–1965); Miami Dolphins (1966–1967); Denver Broncos (1967–1970)

Awards and highlights
- AFL All-Star (1964)
- Stats at Pro Football Reference

Lindell Glenn "Pete" Jaquess (born December 25, 1940) is an American former professional football player who was a defensive back in the American Football League (AFL) and National Football League (NFL). He played college football at Eastern New Mexico University. Jaquess played in the AFL for the Houston Oilers, Miami Dolphins, and Denver Broncos, as well as for the NFL's Broncos. He was an AFL All-Star with the Oilers in his rookie year, 1964.

== Early life ==
Jaquess was born on December 25, 1940, in Earth, Texas to Curtis (a carpenter and home builder) and Beula Jaquess. He was the second oldest of five brothers and one sister. The family moved to Roswell, New Mexico in 1956, where Jaquess attended Roswell High School.

== College career ==
Jaquess attended Eastern New Mexico University (ENMU), though he did not receive an athletic scholarship. He was a two-way player and punter on the school's football team. He was known as "Fleet Pete". As a freshman in 1960, Jaquess was given consistent playing time as a defensive back, and was a successful punter; while being used more sporadically on offense at halfback. As a sophomore halfback in 1961, he set ENMU rushing records of six yards per carry and 684 total rushing yards.

As a junior, in an October 1962 game against Colorado Western he scored two touchdowns playing halfback on offense, with 35 rushing yards and 86 receiving yards. On defense in that same game, he intercepted two passes and returned one for an 84-yard touchdown. He also punted three times for a 38.6 yards per punt average. During the 1962 season, he had five interceptions as a defensive back. ENMU played in National Association of Intercollegiate Athletics (NAIA) District 7 (consisting of eight small colleges), and the NAIA named Jaquess All-District in 1962.

As a senior in 1963, Jaquess was 5 ft 11 in (1.80 m) 185 lb (83.9 kg). He led District 7 in scoring (12 touchdowns and 102 points) and pass receiving (24 receptions for 383 yards). He was third in rushing with 677 yards in 106 carries. He also had three interceptions as a defensive back. Over his career at ENMU, he set numerous school records on offense, including four rushing records, three pass receiving records and two scoring records. The NAIA named him a second-team All-American as a senior, and All-District. The Williamson Rating System poll named him a first-team All-American. ENMU named him the Greatest Greyhound for the 1962-63 and 1963-64 school years, and he also received the Hugh T. Brasell Award as the football team's most valuable player.

In January 1964, he played for the Southwest college all-stars against a team of national all-stars in the Southwest Challenge Bowl. As a defensive back in that game, he had two interceptions, returning one for a 95-yard touchdown.

== Professional career ==
=== Houston Oilers and San Diego Chargers ===
The Houston Oilers selected Jaquess in the 20th round of the 1964 AFL draft, 158th overall. In 1964, Jaquess started all 14 Oilers' games as a cornerback, playing under head coach Sammy Baugh, who had been a Hall of Fame quarterback. Jacquess had five interceptions in his first four games, and led the Oilers with eight interceptions that season. His eight-interception total tied for fourth best in the AFL that season. In his second game as a rookie, he intercepted a pass against the Oakland Raiders and returned it 98 yards for a touchdown. He was selected to play in the AFL All-Star Game that season, and was named second-team All-AFL by the Associated Press.

He only started four games in 1965, under new head coach Hugh Taylor, playing most games as a reserve behind left cornerback Tony Banfield. He also returned four punts and 13 kickoffs. After the 1965 season, Jaquess said he did not understand why he was not a full time starter in 1965, having done well as a starter in his rookie season; and especially when Banfield was having trouble at times. The Oilers, however, considered Jaquess expendable after the 1965 season.

After the 1965 season, Jaquess's career became intertwined with a long running financial dispute involving the San Diego Chargers' coach Sid Gillman and the Chargers' All-AFL defensive linemen Ernie Ladd and Earl Faison. In mid-January 1966, during the second half of the AFL All-Star Game, Gillman traded Ladd and Faison to the Houston Oilers, owned by Bud Adams, for Jaquess, Johnny Baker and Gary Cutsinger. Gillman simultaneously said he had been forced to make the trade because Adams had tampered with Ladd and Faison by making them substantial financial offers if they joined the Oilers. AFL Commissioner Joe Foss soon voided the trade because of the alleged tampering. Ladd and Faison became free agents in May, and Ladd later signed with the Oilers in early June 1966. This required the Oilers to compensate the Chargers under the AFL's rules. Less than two weeks later, new AFL Commissioner Al Davis awarded Jaquess and Oilers' tight end Willie Frazier to the Chargers as compensation for losing Ladd.

=== Miami Dolphins and Denver Broncos ===
In mid-August 1966, the Chargers released Jaquess. Jaquess then signed with the Miami Dolphins before the start of the 1966 season, and started 10 games that season at free safety. He came in as a reserve in the second game of the season against the New York Jets, and intercepted a pass thrown by future Hall of Fame quarterback Joe Namath. He returned the interception 27 yards for a touchdown. He became a starter in the season's fourth game, against the Chargers. In that game, Jacquess intercepted a pass thrown by four-time AFL All-Star and two-time Pro Bowl quarterback John Hadl. Overall that season he had three interceptions, and returned five kickoffs.

Jaquess was with the Dolphins for seven games in 1967, starting five at strong safety. The Dolphins waived him in early November, and within two days Jaquess signed with the Denver Broncos. He was with the Broncos for three games as a reserve defensive back that season.

In 1968, Jaquess started 11 games at strong safety for the Broncos. He had a team-leading five interceptions. Among these were interceptions against Namath and Hadl again; as well as future Hall of Fame Dolphins' quarterback Bob Griese. He had interceptions against Hadl in both games against the Chargers that season. In 1969, he played seven games for the Broncos as a reserve defensive back, with one fumble recovery that season. In his final professional season, and first in the NFL after the AFL–NFL merger (1970), Jaquess started two of the 13 games in which he appeared, as a defensive back.

The Broncos released Jacquess on September 7, 1971. Over his seven year career, Jaquess appeared in 85 games, started 46 and had 16 interceptions, two of which he returned for touchdowns.

== Honors ==
In 1984, Jaquess was inducted into the Eastern New Mexico University Hall of Honors.

== Personal life ==
After graduating from Eastern New Mexico University in 1964, in 1969, Jaquess received a Masters of Education degree from ENMU. He, his wife Berta and two children moved to El Cajon, California (near San Diego), where he became a general contractor.
