= Frank Emanuel =

American football player (born 1942)

No. 50, 52
- Position: Linebacker

Personal information
- Born: December 4, 1942 (age 83); Clio, South Carolina, U.S.
- Listed height: 6 ft 3 in (1.91 m)
- Listed weight: 225 lb (102 kg)

Career information
- High school: Warwick (Newport News, Virginia)
- College: Tennessee (1962–1965)
- NFL draft: 1966: 4th round, 52nd overall pick
- AFL draft: 1966: 2nd round, 9th overall pick

Career history

Playing
- Miami Dolphins (1966–1969); New Orleans Saints (1970)

Coaching
- Tampa Bay Buccaneers (1982–1983) Special teams coach; Jacksonville Bulls (1984) Defensive coordinator / linebackers coach

Awards and highlights
- Consensus All-American (1965); First-team All-SEC (1965); Second-team All-SEC (1964); Tennessee Sports Hall of Fame (2000)

Career NFL/AFL statistics
- Interceptions: 4
- Fumble recoveries: 1
- Sacks: 2.5
- Stats at Pro Football Reference
- College Football Hall of Fame

Thomas Frank Emanuel (born December 4, 1942) is an American former professional football player who was a linebacker in the National Football League (NFL). He was made captain of the volunteers in 1965. He was elected to the College Football Hall of Fame in 2004. He played for the American Football League (AFL)'s Miami Dolphins and the NFL's New Orleans Saints. He is also a member of the Tennessee Sports Hall of Fame.

== College career ==
Emanuel played college football for the University of Tennessee Volunteers football team. In 1965, his senior season, he was elected to several All-American and All-SEC teams. Emanuel also wrestled for Tennessee in the 1964 NCAA wrestling championships in the Unlimited weight class despite the Volunteers not having a team at the time.
