= John Roderick (American football) =

American football player (born 1944)

No. 87, 41
- Position: Wide receiver

Personal information
- Born: August 21, 1944 (age 82); Fort Worth, Texas, U.S.
- Listed height: 6 ft 0 in (1.83 m)
- Listed weight: 180 lb (82 kg)

Career information
- High school: Highland Park (Dallas, Texas)
- College: SMU (1962–1965)
- NFL draft: 1966: 4th round, 62nd overall pick
- AFL draft: 1966: Red Shirt 1st round, 1st overall pick

Career history
- Miami Dolphins (1966–1967); Oakland Raiders (1968)

Career AFL statistics
- Receptions: 11
- Receiving yards: 156
- Touchdowns: 1
- Stats at Pro Football Reference

John William Roderick (born August 21, 1944) is an American former professional football player who was a wide receiver in the American Football League (AFL). He played college football for the SMU Mustangs.

== Career ==
Roderick played three seasons in the American Football League (AFL), playing two with the Miami Dolphins and one with the Oakland Raiders. Previously, he had been selected by the Green Bay Packers in the fourth round of the 1966 NFL draft and by the Dolphins in the first round of the Redshirt phase of the 1966 AFL draft.

He played at the collegiate level at Southern Methodist University.

1963 SMU Mustangs • The 1963 season provided the SMU football program with one of its most memorable games when the Mustangs hosted fourth-ranked Navy and its heralded quarterback, Roger Staubach, on October 11, 1963, at the Cotton Bowl. On its way to a 4–7 season, SMU was given little chance to beat the Midshipmen. Little-known sophomore John Roderick rushed for 146 yards on 11 carries and scored on touchdown runs of 45 and two yards for the Mustangs. The SMU defense, led by Bob Oyler, Martin Cude, Bill Harlan, Harold Magers and Doug January, sent Staubach to the bench twice with a dislocated left shoulder. Trailing 28–26 with 2:52 remaining in the game, SMU had one last chance to pull off the upset. Quarterback Danny Thomas threw to Billy Gannon, who ran to the Navy 46. On the next play, Roderick took a pitch-out 23 yards to the 23. After a pass interference penalty against Navy put the ball on the one-yard line, Gannon plowed over right tackle for the winning touchdown with 2:05 left. The SMU defense held off Staubach's valiant effort to rally his team for one last score, as the Mustangs pulled off the 32–28 upset. Despite a 4–6 regular season record, SMU parlayed the victory over Navy earlier that season into a Sun Bowl berth against Oregon. Oregon defeated SMU, 21–14.
