= Willie West =

American football player (born 1938)

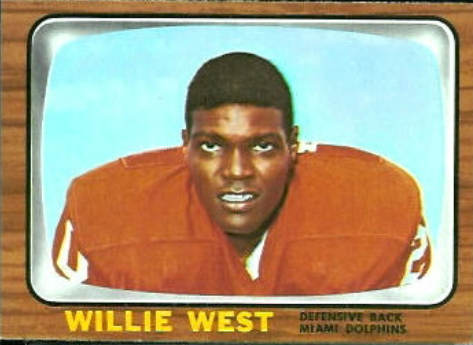

No. 49, 47, 20, 22
- Position: Cornerback

Personal information
- Born: May 1, 1938 (age 88); Lexington, Mississippi, U.S.
- Listed height: 5 ft 10 in (1.78 m)
- Listed weight: 190 lb (86 kg)

Career information
- High school: San Diego (San Diego, California)
- College: Oregon
- NFL draft: 1960: 4th round, 37th overall pick
- AFL draft: 1960: 2nd round

Career history
- St. Louis Cardinals (1960–1961); Buffalo Bills (1962–1963); Denver Broncos (1964); New York Jets (1964–1965); Miami Dolphins (1966–1968)

Awards and highlights
- 2× AFL All-Star (1963, 1966); 2× First-team All-PCC (1958, 1959)

Career NFL/AFL statistics
- Interceptions: 30
- Fumble recoveries: 3
- Total touchdowns: 2
- Stats at Pro Football Reference

Willie Tennyson West (born May 1, 1938) is an American former professional football player who was a defensive back in the National Football League (NFL) and American Football League (AFL). He played college football for the Oregon Ducks. West played for nine seasons professionally: for the NFL's St. Louis Cardinals; and for the AFL's Buffalo Bills, Denver Broncos, New York Jets, and Miami Dolphins. He was an AFL All-Star for the Bills in 1963, and for the Dolphins in 1966.

== Early life ==
West was born on May 1, 1938, in Lexington, Mississippi. West attended San Diego High School, where he was on the football team and a multi-sport star. In 1955, San Diego was the California Interscholastic Federation (CIF) football champion. West was a 5 ft 10 in (1.78 m) 170 lb (77.1 kg) senior running back on the team. He scored two touchdowns in San Diego's 26–14 win over Alhambra High School in the CIF championship game, held at the Aztec Bowl in San Diego before 8,000 people. He was selected a first-team Helms All-Southern California All-Star. His teammate Deron Johnson, a future Major League Baseball player, was also named a first-team Helms All-Star, at end. The 1955 team was considered to be the best high school team in the United States.

== College career ==
West attended the University of Oregon where he played running back for the Ducks from 1957 to 1959, as well as defensive back. As a sophomore in 1957, he played in all 10 games, with 24 rushing attempts for 88 yards and two receptions for 49 yards. He also played a key role on a defense that limited their opponents to 8.8 points per game. The 1957 Ducks team went to the Rose Bowl, losing to Ohio State, 10–7. Ohio State was heavily favored, and scored a touchdown on its first drive; but did not score again until making a field goal in the fourth quarter, winning the game by those three points. West had two rushing attempts in the game, including a 14-yard gain. He was also 3-for-3 passing, including an 18-yard completion.

As a junior in 1958, he rushed 101 times for 470 yards and one touchdown; and had 18 receptions for 140 yards. He again played a key role for the Duck defense, that limited opponents to five points per game that season. In 1958, United Press International (UPI) selected West to its first-team All-Pacific Coast Football Team. The Associated Press (AP) likewise named him first-team All-Pacific Coast.

As a senior in 1959, West was a team co-captain and an honorable mention All-American. He gained 474 rushing yards in 108 attempts, with six rushing touchdowns. He had 17 receptions (tied for the team lead) for 187 yards and two receiving touchdowns. He also completed five of seven passes for 88 yards, returned 13 kickoffs for 273 yards, and returned nine punts for 99 yards. On defense, he had three interceptions. He led the Ducks in scoring that year (48 points). The Associated Press named him first-team All-Pacific Coast for the second consecutive year. He also received the University of Oregon's 1959 Hoffman Award, as co-recipient with Tom Keele, for the football team's most valuable player.

He played for the National Team as a defensive back in the second Copper Bowl. He was selected to play in the 1960 Hula Bowl at running back. One of his Oregon teammates was future All-AFL and multi-time All-Star defensive back Dave Grayson.

== Professional career ==
West was selected by the National Football League's (NFL) Chicago Cardinals in the fourth round of the 1960 NFL draft, 37th overall. West was also taken by the Denver Broncos in the inaugural American Football League (AFL) draft. The NFL draft was held on November 30, 1959, and the Cardinals moved the franchise to St. Louis in March 1960.

West chose the Cardinals and appeared in eight games in 1960, not starting any games. He returned five punts for 58 yards, and 13 kickoffs for 370 yards, including an 87-yard return against the Pittsburgh Steelers on October 16. The following season he started five games at left cornerback, with one interception. He returned 11 punts for 98 yards, and 16 kickoffs for 340 yards. In a game against the New York Giants, he recovered a fumble in the end zone for a touchdown.

The Cardinals released West in early September 1962, a few days before the NFL season started. West was signed by the Buffalo Bills on September 21, a day before the Bills' third game of the 1962 AFL season. He started seven of the 12 games in which he appeared, at cornerback, with three interceptions on the season. He had 15 punt returns for 124 yards, but was not used as a kick returner.

West started all 14 games of the 1963 Bills' season at left cornerback. He had five interceptions on the season, and was selected to play in the 1963 AFL All-Star Game. The Bills traded West before the 1964 season to the Denver Broncos for running back John Sklopan. He played in seven games for the Broncos that season, with one interception, and was suspended in late October along with placekicker Gene Mingo for rules infractions. West was released by the Broncos and signed by the New York Jets in early November. He started three games as a defensive back for the Jets, with one interception. He also returned five kickoffs for 142 yards.

In 1965, he started 12 games for the Jets at left cornerback, with six interceptions. He also returned 10 punts for 34 yards. The Miami Dolphins acquired West from the Jets in 1966 expansion draft. West became the Dolphins starting strong safety in 1966, the Dolphins inaugural season. He was one the Dolphins' starters for the first game in the team's history. He had a career-high eight interceptions. In the 1966 season, West led the Miami Dolphins in tackles (94), as well as interceptions.

In an October 23, 1966 game against the Houston Oilers, he intercepted three George Blanda passes, including two in the fourth quarter, to help secure one of Miami's three 1966 victories. He was selected for the second time to play in the AFL All-Star Game. He was also named second-team All-AFL by UPI.

West was only able to start five games in 1967, after suffering a shoulder separation in a preseason exhibition game. His last season came in 1968 with the Dolphins. West started nine games, playing both safety positions; with four interceptions. He also scored a touchdown in 1968 when teammate John Bramlett recovered a fumble against the Houston Oilers and lateralled the ball to West, who ran 20 yards for a touchdown.

West retired in April 1969. He had 13 interceptions and 224 tackles over his three-year Dolphin career. At the time he retired, his 29 interceptions ranked in the top 10 in AFL history.

== Legacy and honors ==
On November 2, 2007, he was inducted into University of Oregon Athletics Hall of Fame.

== Personal life ==
After retiring in 1969, West worked as an assistant purchasing agent for a Miami department store.

== See also ==
- List of American Football League players
