= Tom Erlandson (linebacker, born 1940) =

American football player (born 1940)

No. 53, 58
- Position: Linebacker

Personal information
- Born: March 24, 1940 (age 86); Seattle, Washington, U.S.
- Listed height: 6 ft 3 in (1.91 m)
- Listed weight: 235 lb (107 kg)

Career information
- High school: Bellingham (Bellingham, Washington)
- College: Washington State
- NFL draft: 1962: undrafted

Career history
- Denver Broncos (1962–1965); Miami Dolphins (1966–1967); San Diego Chargers (1968)

Awards and highlights
- AFL All-Star (1966)

Career NFL statistics
- Games played: 68
- Stats at Pro Football Reference

Thomas Dean Erlandson (born March 24, 1940) is an American former professional football player who was a linebacker for seven seasons in the American Football League (AFL) for the Denver Broncos, Miami Dolphins, and San Diego Chargers. He is the father of Tom Erlandson.
