= Joe Auer =

American football player (1941–2019)

No. 43, 32, 38
- Position: Running back

Personal information
- Born: October 11, 1941; Trenton, New Jersey, U.S.
- Died: March 9, 2019 (aged 77); Winter Park, Florida, U.S.
- Listed height: 6 ft 1 in (1.85 m)
- Listed weight: 200 lb (91 kg)

Career information
- High school: Coral Gables Senior (FL)
- College: Georgia Tech
- NFL draft: 1963: 5th round, 57th overall pick
- AFL draft: 1963: 15th round, 120th overall pick

Career history
- Buffalo Bills (1964–1965); Miami Dolphins (1966–1967); Atlanta Falcons (1968)

Awards and highlights
- 2× AFL champion (1964, 1965); First touchdown scored by Dolphins; Dolphins team MVP, 1966

Career NFL/AFL statistics
- Rushing yards: 773
- Rushing average: 3.3
- Receptions: 51
- Receiving yards: 647
- Total touchdowns: 15
- Stats at Pro Football Reference

Joseph Auer (October 11, 1941 – March 9, 2019) was an American professional football player who was a running back in the American Football League (AFL) for the Buffalo Bills (1964–1965) and the Miami Dolphins (1966–1967), and in the National Football League (NFL) for the Atlanta Falcons. He graduated from Coral Gables Senior High School in Coral Gables, Florida and played collegiately for Georgia Tech.

He is most remembered for returning the opening kickoff for a touchdown for the Dolphins in their first regular-season football game in 1966, 95 yards against the Oakland Raiders. Subsequently, he was the Dolphins' Most Valuable Player.

== Sports career ==
Auer is best known as a professional American football player. He played college football at Georgia Tech, where he earned a degree in mechanical engineering and also held a Gator Bowl record (44 years) for his 68-yard touchdown run from scrimmage. Later to be broken by Leon Washington in 2005 on his 69-yard run. He was drafted by the Kansas City Chiefs and after a productive preseason got traded to the Buffalo Bills for a first-round draft pick, where he played for two years as a running back on their 1964 and 1965 championship team. When the brand new Miami Dolphins found that their running game was ineffective after their first two exhibition games, they acquired Auer off of waivers from the Los Angeles Rams. He played for the Miami Dolphins before ending his career in the National Football League with the Atlanta Falcons. Auer is most famous for taking the opening kickoff in the Miami Dolphins' first-ever game in 1966 and returning it 95 yards for a touchdown in front of 26,000 fans including Steve Siegert, Les Clements and Ware Cornell. He went on to be the Dolphins’ leading scorer that year; not surprisingly, he became the Dolphins' first MVP.

After retiring from football, Auer founded RaceCar Engineering, a company that built high-quality race cars, some of which set track records and won championships for the company's customers. He then began Competitive Edge Motorsports, racing both the Busch and Nextel Cup Series in NASCAR between 2004 and 2006.

== See also ==
- Other American Football League players
