= Dick Wood =

American football player and coach (1936–2015)

No. 12, 17, 16, 19, 18
- Position: Quarterback

Personal information
- Born: February 29, 1936; Lanett, Alabama, U.S.
- Died: April 4, 2015 (aged 79); Atlanta, Georgia, U.S.
- Listed height: 6 ft 5 in (1.96 m)
- Listed weight: 205 lb (93 kg)

Career information
- College: Auburn
- NFL draft: 1959: 12th round, 144th overall pick

Career history

Playing
- Denver Broncos (1962); San Diego Chargers (1962); New York Jets (1963–1964); Oakland Raiders (1965); Miami Dolphins (1966)

Coaching
- Georgia (1967) Graduate assistant; Oakland Raiders (1969-1970) Receivers coach; Ole Miss (1971-1973) Offensive assistant; Cleveland Browns (1974) Offensive coordinator; New Orleans Saints (1976–1977) Quarterbacks coach; Atlanta Falcons (1978–1982) Quarterbacks coach; Philadelphia Eagles (1983) Offensive coordinator; Auburn (1986) Offensive assistant; Kansas City Chiefs (1987–1988) Receivers coach; New England Patriots (1989–1990) Receivers coach; Philadelphia Eagles (1991–1994) Running backs coach; New York Jets (1995) Running backs coach

Awards and highlights
- National champion (1957)

Career AFL statistics
- Passing attempts: 1,194
- Passing completions: 522
- Completion percentage: 43.7%
- TD–INT: 51–71
- Passing yards: 7,153
- Passer rating: 52.9
- Stats at Pro Football Reference
- Coaching profile at Pro Football Reference

Malcolm Richard Wood (February 29, 1936 – April 4, 2015) was an American football quarterback and coach who played college football at Auburn and professionally in the American Football League (AFL). After his player career ended, Wood served as an assistant coach in college football and the National Football League (NFL) over four decades.

== As a player ==
Playing for Lanett High School, Wood was named to the All-State team in Alabama in 1954. He went on to help lead Auburn to an undefeated season in 1958. He was drafted in the 12th round by the Baltimore Colts of the National Football League (NFL) in 1959. He never played for the Colts, and signed with the Denver Broncos of the American Football League (AFL) as a free agent in 1962. Later in that season, Wood saw his first significant playing time as a member of the San Diego Chargers, playing in 6 games and starting 2 (he filled in for teammates Jack Kemp and John Hadl). He then spent two seasons (1963 and 1964) with the New York Jets, starting 12 games in each year. The Jets drafted Joe Namath in 1965, and Wood landed as a backup for the Oakland Raiders, starting 3 games in relief of Tom Flores. The next year, he was a member of the Miami Dolphins' inaugural season.

== Coaching career ==
In the next 30 years after his playing days, Wood held over a dozen offensive assistant coaching positions. He worked under Hank Stram in New Orleans as a quarterbacks coach, with Archie Manning under center. Afterwards, he was on the staff of the first Atlanta Falcons team to reach the playoffs in 1978. He coached Randall Cunningham and the Philadelphia Eagles during the early 1990s. He retired from coaching in 1997.

== Statistics and legacy ==
Wood started 33 games and completed 522 career passes for 51 touchdowns and 71 interceptions in his professional career.

He played for five different AFL teams during his football career, the only player to ever do so.

Wood was the first quarterback to throw for a touchdown at Shea Stadium.

In 1966, Wood became the first starting quarterback in Miami Dolphins history.

== Outside of football ==
Wood was married to Peggy Bartlett, who was also from his hometown of Lanett. The couple had a daughter and a son. After suffering from dementia, Wood died in Atlanta. He was 79.

== See also ==
- List of American Football League players
