= Tom Nomina =

American football player (born 1941)

No. 68, 76
- Positions: Defensive tackle, Guard

Personal information
- Born: December 27, 1941; Delphos, Ohio, U.S.
- Died: February 17, 2019 (aged 77); Fort Myers, Florida, U.S.
- Listed height: 6 ft 3 in (1.91 m)
- Listed weight: 260 lb (118 kg)

Career information
- High school: St. John's (Delphos)
- College: Miami (OH)
- NFL draft: 1963: 2nd round, 15th overall pick
- AFL draft: 1963: 2nd round, 13th overall pick

Career history
- Denver Broncos (1963-1965); Miami Dolphins (1966-1968)

Awards and highlights
- Third-team All-American (1962)

Career AFL statistics
- Fumble recoveries: 1
- Sacks: 3
- Stats at Pro Football Reference

Thomas John Nomina (December 27, 1941 - February 17, 2019) was an American professional football player who was a defensive tackle in the American Football League (AFL) for the Denver Broncos and Miami Dolphins. He played college football for the Miami Redskins.

He was drafted in the National Football League (NFL) by the Los Angeles Rams, but decided on a career in the American Football League instead.
