= Dick Westmoreland =

American football player (born 1941)

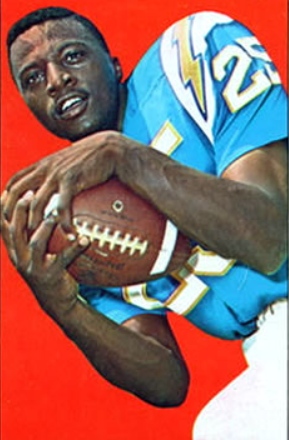

No. 25
- Position: Defensive back

Personal information
- Born: February 17, 1941 (age 85); Charlotte, North Carolina, U.S.

Career information
- College: North Carolina A&T

Career history
- San Diego Chargers (1963–1965); Miami Dolphins (1966–1969)

Awards and highlights
- AFL champion (1963); AFL All-Star (1967); AFL interceptions leader (1967)

Career statistics
- Games played: 81
- Interceptions: 22
- Stats at Pro Football Reference

Richard Carl Westmoreland (born February 17, 1941) is an American former professional football player who was a defensive back in the American Football League (NFL). In 1963, he joined the AFL's San Diego Chargers. He played for the Chargers and Miami Dolphins for seven seasons and was an AFL All-Star selection in 1967. Westmoreland holds the Dolphins' team record for most interceptions in a season with 10 in 1967 (since tied with Xavien Howard).

== See also ==
- Other American Football League players
