= John Stofa =

American football player (1942–2022)

No. 15, 5
- Position: Quarterback

Personal information
- Born: June 29, 1942; Johnstown, Pennsylvania, U.S.
- Died: April 23, 2022 (aged 79); Mason, Ohio, U.S.
- Listed height: 6 ft 3 in (1.91 m)
- Listed weight: 210 lb (95 kg)

Career information
- High school: Bishop McCort (Johnstown)
- College: Buffalo (1960-1963)
- NFL draft: 1964: undrafted

Career history

Playing
- Pittsburgh Steelers (1966)*; Miami Dolphins (1966-1967); Cincinnati Bengals (1968); Miami Dolphins (1969-1970); Jacksonville Sharks (1974)
- * Offseason or practice squad member only

Coaching
- Jacksonville Sharks (1974) Offensive backfield coach

Career NFL/AFL statistics
- Passing attempts: 312
- Passing completions: 146
- Completion percentage: 46.8%
- TD–INT: 12–11
- Passing yards: 1,758
- Passer rating: 62.7
- Stats at Pro Football Reference

John Carl Stofa (June 29, 1942 – April 23, 2022) was an American professional football player who was a quarterback in the American Football League (AFL) and National Football League (NFL).

== Early life ==
John Stofa was born in Johnstown, Pennsylvania, the son of John and Ann Stofa.

He graduated from Bishop McCort High School. He attended the University at Buffalo where, as a member of the Class of 1964, he was the Bulls starting quarterback in 1962 and 1963. As a starter those seasons, the Bulls were 6–3 and 5–3–1, respectively. He set passing and total yardage records as the Bulls' quarterback. He also played baseball at Buffalo from 1962 to 1964.

== Professional career ==
=== Miami Dolphins, first stint ===
Stofa began his pro football career in the American Football League in 1966 for the expansion team Miami Dolphins. He played his first two seasons with the Dolphins, playing in a total of eight games, starting two. With the Dolphins, he completed 31 passes in 59 attempts for 476 yards and four touchdowns. His first career touchdown pass was a 27-yard completion to Joe Auer in a 29–28 win over the Houston Oilers in the final game of the season.

=== Cincinnati Bengals ===
Stofa was traded to the AFL expansion team Cincinnati Bengals prior to the 1968 season. He was the first Bengal in franchise history, signing with the team in December 1967. He has used the license plate "1ST BNGL.

He played one season (1968) with the Bengals, completing 85 passes in 177 attempts for 896 yards with five touchdowns and five interceptions as the Bengals went 3–11 in their inaugural season. Stofa shared time with fellow Bengals quarterbacks Dewey Warren and Sam Wyche.

Stofa holds the distinction of throwing the first touchdown pass in Bengals history. In the team's second game, he completed a 58-yard pass to tight end Bob Trumpy in the third quarter of a 24–10 win over the Denver Broncos for the first win in team history.

The following year, the Bengals drafted Greg Cook to become their starter. Stofa was waived during training camp, but then signed to the Bengals taxi squad. He was later claimed off waivers by the Dolphins.

=== Miami Dolphins, second stint ===
Stofa returned to the Dolphins for the 1969 season and for 1970, the Dolphins' first year in the NFL after the AFL–NFL Merger. Stofa, playing behind Bob Griese and Rick Norton, played in just one game for the Dolphins in 1969, with 14 completions in 23 attempts for 146 yards.

In 1970, backing up starter Bob Griese, Stofa played in eight games, with 16 completions in 53 attempts for 240 yards and three touchdowns. It was the fifth and last season of his five-year AFL–NFL career.

=== Jacksonville Sharks ===
In 1974, Stofa returned to pro football, signing with the World Football League's Jacksonville Sharks in the league's only season. Backing up quarterbacks Reggie Oliver and Kay Stephenson, Stofa completed two passes in five attempts for 24 yards and one touchdown.

== Personal life ==
He was inducted into the University at Buffalo Athletic Hall of Fame in 1973. He retired after many years with Medical Mutual of Ohio and resided in Mason, Ohio. He was also a former board member of the University at Buffalo Blue and White Club, which holds annual fund-raising campaigns to provide scholarships for UB student-athletes and activities to enhance the visibility and reputation of the university's Division of Athletics. Stofa died on April 23, 2022, at the age of 79.

== Statistics ==
| Year | Team | # Games | Att. | Comp. | Yards | TD | INT |
|---|---|---|---|---|---|---|---|
| 1966 | Miami Dolphins (AFL) | 7 | 57 | 29 | 425 | 4 | 2 |
| 1967 | Miami Dolphins (AFL) | 1 | 2 | 2 | 51 | 0 | 0 |
| 1968 | Cincinnati Bengals (AFL) | 10 | 177 | 85 | 896 | 5 | 5 |
| 1969 | Miami Dolphins (AFL) | 1 | 23 | 14 | 146 | 0 | 2 |
| 1970 | Miami Dolphins (NFL) | 6 | 53 | 16 | 240 | 3 | 2 |

== See also ==
- List of American Football League players
