= Ernie Park =

American football player (born 1940)

No. 61, 60, 74
- Positions: Guard, Tackle

Personal information
- Born: October 22, 1940 (age 86); San Angelo, Texas, U.S.
- Listed height: 6 ft 3 in (1.91 m)
- Listed weight: 253 lb (115 kg)

Career information
- High school: Wylie (TX)
- College: McMurry (1959-1962)
- NFL draft: 1963: 17th round, 230th overall pick
- AFL draft: 1963: 19th round, 146th overall pick

Career history
- San Diego Chargers (1963–1965); Miami Dolphins (1966); Denver Broncos (1967); Cincinnati Bengals (1969)

Awards and highlights
- AFL champion (1963)

Career AFL statistics
- Games played: 74
- Games started: 36
- Fumble recoveries: 4
- Stats at Pro Football Reference

Ernest Carol Park (born October 22, 1940) is an American former professional football player who was an offensive lineman in the American Football Conference (AFL) for the San Diego Chargers, Miami Dolphins, Denver Broncos, and Cincinnati Bengals. He played college football for the McMurry War Hawks.
