= Bob Neff =

American football player (born 1944)

No. 43
- Position: Defensive back

Personal information
- Born: March 5, 1944 (age 82); Hearne, Texas, U.S.
- Listed height: 5 ft 11 in (1.80 m)
- Listed weight: 180 lb (82 kg)

Career information
- High school: Hearne
- College: Stephen F. Austin (1962-1965)
- NFL draft: 1966: undrafted

Career history
- Miami Dolphins (1966-1968)

Career AFL statistics
- Interceptions: 2
- Fumble recoveries: 2
- Kick/Punt return yards: 1,082
- Stats at Pro Football Reference

Bob Neff (born March 5, 1944) is an American former professional football player who was a defensive back for the Miami Dolphins of the American Football League (AFL) from 1966 to 1968. He played college football for the Stephen F. Austin Lumberjacks.
