= Rick Norton =

American football player (1943–2013)

No. 11
- Position: Quarterback

Personal information
- Born: November 16, 1943; Louisville, Kentucky, U.S.
- Died: July 25, 2013 (aged 69); Louisville, Kentucky, U.S.
- Listed height: 6 ft 2 in (1.88 m)
- Listed weight: 200 lb (91 kg)

Career information
- High school: Flaget (Louisville)
- College: Kentucky (1962–1965)
- NFL draft: 1966: 2nd round, 29th overall pick
- AFL draft: 1966: 1st round, 2nd overall pick

Career history
- Miami Dolphins (1966–1969); Green Bay Packers (1970)

Awards and highlights
- Second-team All-American (1965)

Career NFL/AFL statistics
- Passing attempts: 382
- Passing completions: 159
- Completion percentage: 41.6%
- TD–INT: 7–30
- Passing yards: 1,815
- Passer rating: 30
- Stats at Pro Football Reference

Richard Eugene Norton (November 16, 1943 – July 25, 2013) was an American professional football player who was a quarterback in the National Football League (NFL). He played college football for the Kentucky Wildcats before playing with the American Football League (AFL)'s Miami Dolphins from 1966 to 1969, and one game for the NFL's Green Bay Packers in 1970. He died of natural causes on July 25, 2013.

Norton holds the distinction of throwing the last professional touchdown pass at Wrigley Field. It came on a 29-yard pass to John Hilton in the fourth quarter of a 35–17 Chicago Bears victory over Norton's Packers on December 13, 1970.

== Life and career ==
Richard Eugene "Rick" Norton was born on November 16, 1943, in Louisville, Kentucky. Norton became an all-stater at Flaget High School. During his collegiate career with the Kentucky Wildcats, he was named to the second-team All-American team in 1965. One season earlier, Norton led the Southeastern Conference in pass attempts, completions, passing yards, and average yards per attempt, completion, and game, as well as passer rating. In the 30 games he played with the Kentucky Wildcats, Norton completed 298 out of 598 pass attempts (just under 50%) for 4,514 yards, with 26 touchdown passes and 44 interceptions.

After college, Norton was selected second overall in the 1966 American Football League (AFL) draft by the expansion Miami Dolphins and 29th in 1966 National Football League (NFL) draft by the Cleveland Browns, both held on November 27, 1965. According to Time magazine, the consensus among pro scouts was the quarterback prospects for the 1966 drafts was "awful" but described Norton as "the best of a bad lot." On December 10, 1965, the Dolphins signed Norton to their roster via a three-year, $350,000 contract, making him the second-highest paid football player at the time, behind only Joe Namath.

During his four seasons with the Dolphins, Norton would appear in 32 games, starting in only 11 of them despite his large contract at the time. His first start occurred in the second week of the 1966 season, at home against the New York Jets, when he completed 8 out of 20 passes for 97 yards, with 1 touchdown and 1 interception in a 14-19 loss. Norton recorded a passer rating of zero three times, all as a starter, on the road against the Buffalo Bills one week later and at home versus the Houston Oilers and New York Jets in 1969. His lone win as a starter was in the penultimate week of the 1969 season, at home against the Denver Broncos. In that match, Norton completed 14 out of 27 passes, with 123 yards, 2 touchdown passes, and 1 interception in a 27-24 victory.

After struggling in a preseason game in 1970, Norton became the first returning player to be released by new head coach Don Shula. On December 2, 1970, the Green Bay Packers signed Norton due to injuries to Bart Starr and Frank Patrick. He appeared in one game for the Packers, on the road against the Chicago Bears on December 13, completing 3 out of 5 pass attempts for 64 yards and 1 touchdown pass. It was the last professional touchdown pass at Wrigley Field,a 29-yard throw to John Hilton in the fourth quarter of a 35–17 Bears win.

Throughout his professional career, Norton completed 159 out of 382 pass attempts (41.6%). He also threw 7 touchdown passes versus 30 interceptions, with all but 1 of the former occurring during his tenure with the Miami Dolphins. After retiring from football, he worked construction and government jobs in Kentucky, including for state parks and as the Kentucky State Racing Commission's executive director in the 1980s. Norton died of natural causes in Louisville on July 25, 2013.

== See also ==
- List of American Football League players
