= List of Vanderbilt Commodores football All-Americans =

Vanderbilt Commodores football All-Americans are American football players who have been named as All-Americans while playing for the Vanderbilt University football team.

== Overview ==
Since 1906, 18 Vanderbilt Commodores football players have earned first-team All-American honors.

Owsley Manier was the first ever Commodore selected All-American, making Walter Camp's third-team. Bob Blake was the first to make an All-America first team. Lynn Bomar was the first Vanderbilt player selected first-team All-American by Camp and the first consensus All-American. Camp rarely saw Southern players and thus rarely selected Southern players. Bomar was his only ever first-team selection from teams in the current Southeastern Conference.

5 Vanderbilt players have been consensus All-American selections: Lynn Bomar; Hek Wakefield; Pete Gracey; George Deiderich; and Jim Arnold.

== Sortable chart of Vanderbilt's All-Americans ==
Player	Position	Year	Unanimous	Consensus	Selectors
Manier, Owsley	FB	1906	No	No	WC-3
Blake, Bob	E	1907	No	No	FY-1
Metzger, W. E.	G	1910	No	No	WC-3
Morrison, Ray	QB	1911	No	No	HL; COY [hb]
Hardage, Lewie	HB	1912	No	No	WC-3
Cody, Josh	T	1915	No	No	WC-3
Curry, Rabbit	QB	1916	No	No	WC-3
Cody, Josh	T	1919	No	No	WC-3; DJ-1
Bomar, Lynn	E	1922	No	No	WC-2; WE-3; BE; FM-1
Kuhn, Doc	QB	1922	No	No	BE
Bomar, Lynn	E	1923	No	Yes	AW-2; WC-1; FW
Wakefield, Hek	E	1923	No	No	NB-2; DW-1
Reese, Gil	HB	1923	No	No	DW-3
Wakefield, Hek	E	1924	No	Yes	WC-2; INS; NEA; LP-1; BE-1; NB-1; DW-1; WE-3; BC
Reese, Gil	HB	1924	No	No	NB-3
Spears, Bill	QB	1927	No	No	AP-1; UP-2; CP-2; HE-3; DJW-1; LP-2
Abernathy, Dick	E	1928	No	No	CP-1, UP-3
Brown, Bull	G	1928	No	No	UP-2
Brown, Bull	G	1929	No	No	NYS-2; NANA-1
Schwartz, Bill	E	1930	No	No	CP-2
Gracey, Pete	C	1931	No	No	CP-2
Gracey, Pete	C	1932	No	Yes	AP-2; UP-1; NEA-2; INS-2; NYS-2; NYT-1; TR-1, CP-3; PD
Hinkle, Carl	C	1937	No	No	AP-1; UP-2; COL-1; INS-2; CP-1
Gude, Bob	C	1941	No	No	CP-3
Curtis, Bucky	E	1950	No	No	APO-2; FWO-1; INSD-1; CP-2
Werckle, Bob	T	1951	No	No	AP-2
Wade, Bill	QB	1951	No	No	AP-2
Horton, Charley	HB	1955	No	No	INS-3
Deiderich, George	G	1958	No	Yes	AP, AFCA, FWAA
Healy, Chip	LB	1968	No	No	CP
Asher, Bob	T	1969	No	No	NEA, CP
Burton, Barry	WR	1974	No	No	FN
Arnold, Jim	P	1982	No	Yes	AP, UPI, NEA, AFCA, FWAA, TSN
Anderson, Ricky	P	1984	No	Yes	AP, UPI, NEA, WC, AFCA, FWAA
Duncan, Jamie	LB	1997	No	No	AFCA-Coaches, FWAA-Writers
Matthews, Jordan	WR	2013	No	No	USAT, Athlon
Cunningham, Zach	LB	2016	Yes	Yes	AFCA, FWAA, AP, WC, SI
