= List of Green Bay Packers NFL All-Decade Team selections =

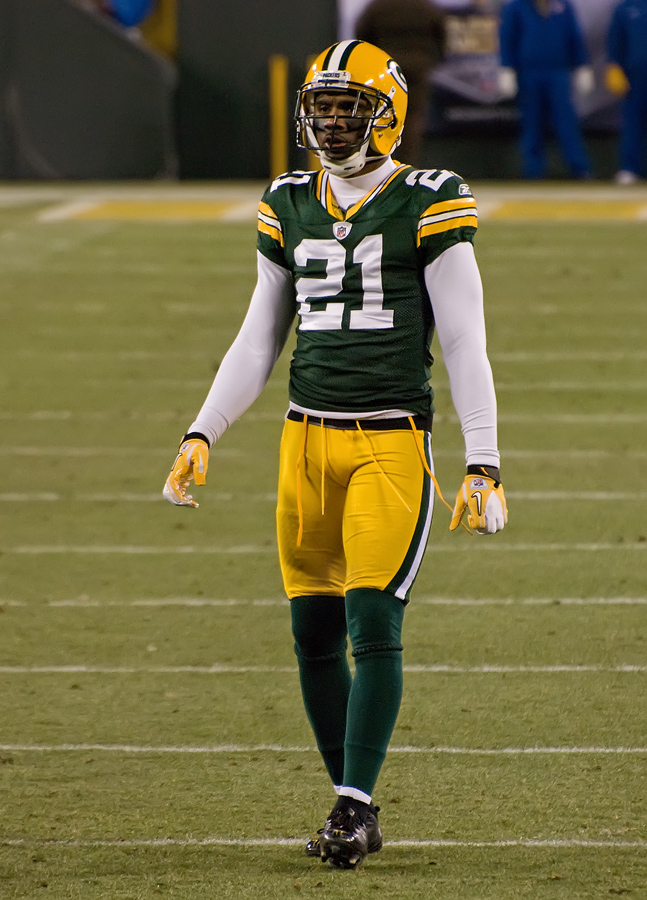
Charles Woodson was one of two selections for the 2000s Team.

The Green Bay Packers are a professional American football team based in Green Bay, Wisconsin. The Packers have competed in the National Football League (NFL) since 1921, two years after their original founding by Curly Lambeau and George Whitney Calhoun. They are members of the North Division of the National Football Conference (NFC) and play their home games at Lambeau Field in central Wisconsin.

In 1969, in recognition of the 50th anniversary of the NFL, the Pro Football Hall of Fame identified NFL All-Decade Teams for the first four decades of the history of the league (1920s, 1930s, 1940s and 1950s). Players were selected based solely on their performance during the specified decade, with accomplishments before or after not considered. After each subsequent decade, a new team was identified, with the most recent being selected for the 2010s. Each team was selected by the Pro Football Hall of Fame Selection Committee, which is primarily made up of national sportswriters. The Selection Committee is asked to select specific numbers of typical American football positions to develop the team. From the 1920s to the 2000s, each team was split into first-team and second-team selections, although starting with the 2010s Team no distinction was made. Additionally, although standard offensive, defensive and special teams positions were always included, the position names, types of positions and the number of positions did change from decade to decade. As an example, for the 2010s Team, due to its greatly reduced usage, the fullback position was not included and a new "flex" offensive position was added.

The Packers have had 45 players named to All-Decade Teams, with at least one player named to each of the 10 teams. The 1960s Team included 13 Packers players, the most the Packers have had selected to one All-Decade Team, followed closely by the 1930s team and its 10 Packers. The 1970s team only included one Packers player, Ted Hendricks, who only played one season in the 1970s for the Packers. Of the 45 Packers named to All-Decade Teams, 28 have been inducted into the Pro Football Hall of Fame and 34 have been inducted into the Green Bay Packers Hall of Fame. The most recent Packers selections were for the 2010s Team: Aaron Rodgers, Julius Peppers and Jahri Evans.

== Team selections ==
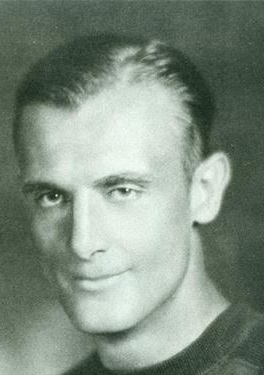
LaVern Dilweg was the only Packers selection for the 1920s Team who was not inducted into the Pro Football Hall of Fame.

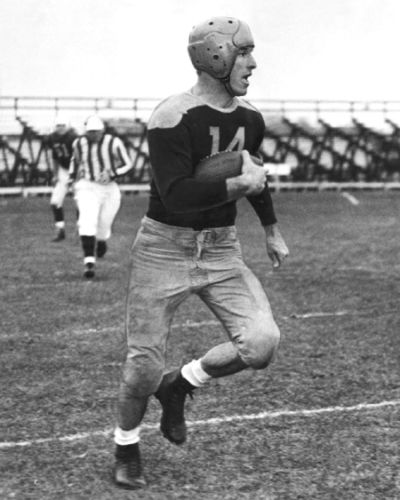
Don Hutson was selected for the 1930s Team.

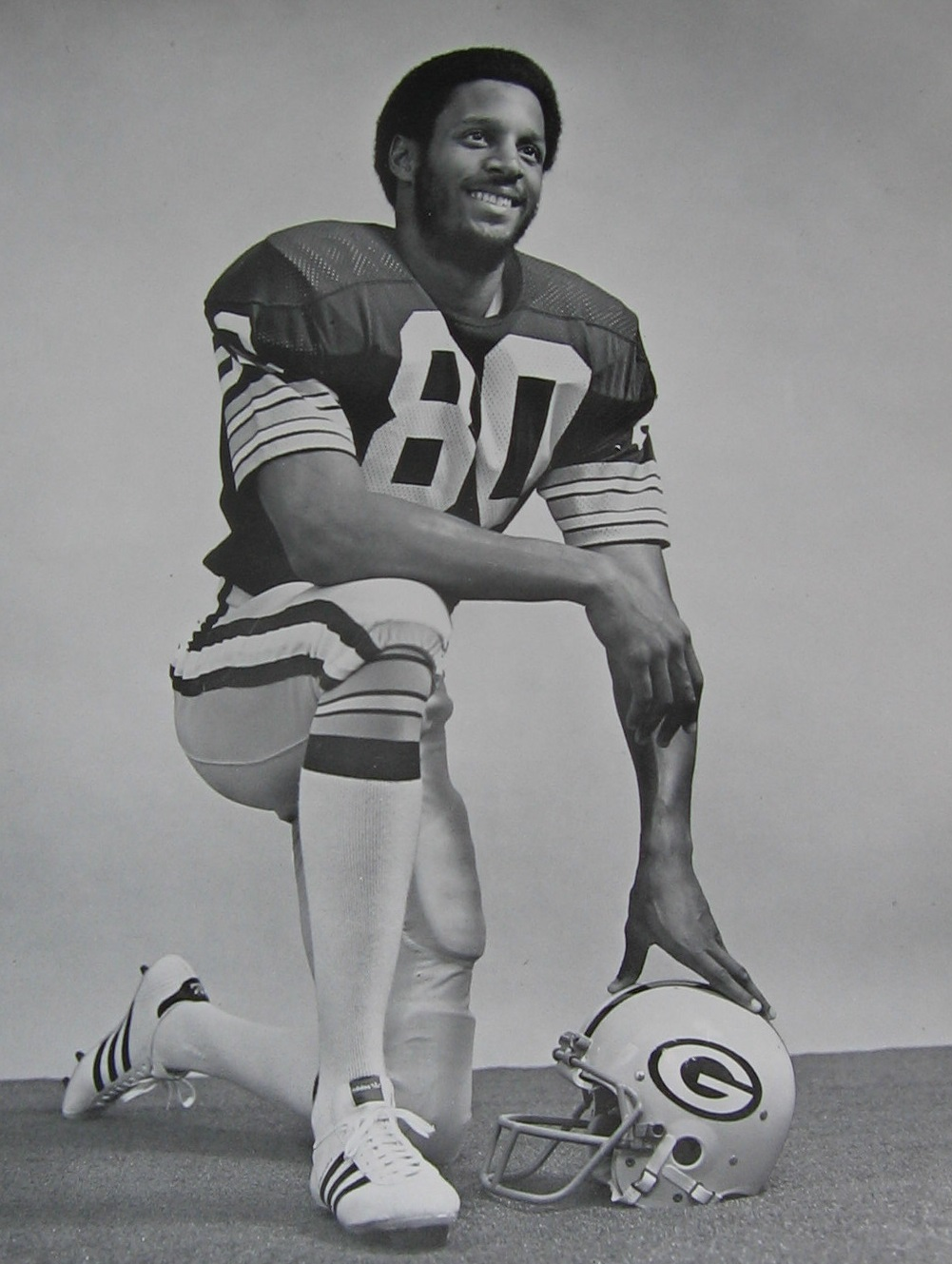
James Lofton was selected for the 1980s Team.

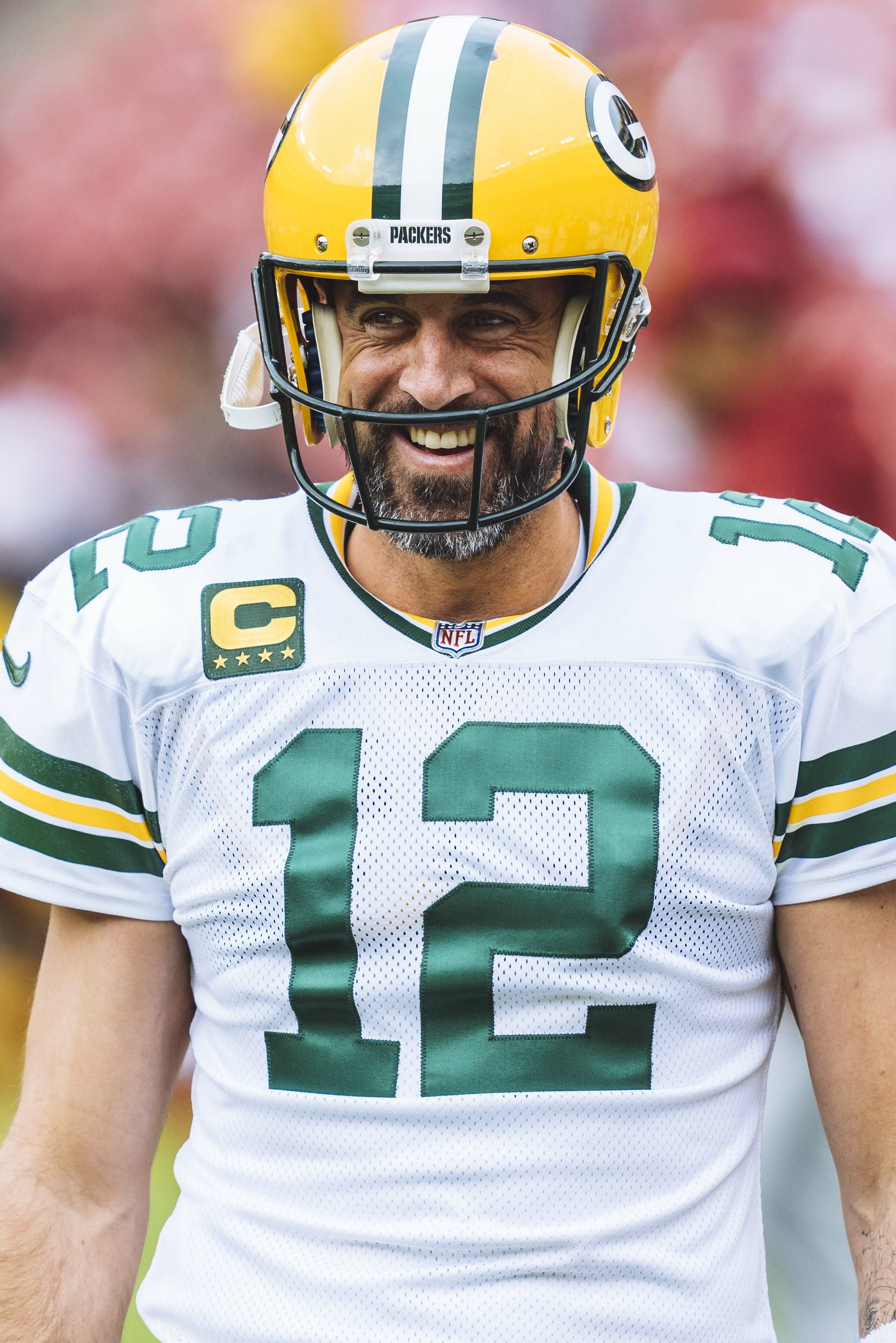
Aaron Rodgers was selected for the 2010s Team.

Key
^{#}	Inducted into the Green Bay Packers Hall of Fame
†	Inducted into the Pro Football Hall of Fame
‡	Inducted into the Green Bay Packers Hall of Fame and Pro Football Hall of Fame

Green Bay Packers NFL All-Decade Team selections
All-Decade Team	# of Packers selected	Player	Position (Note: Corresponds to the position identified in each All-Decade Team.)	Seasons with Packers	Refs
1920s	5	LaVern Dilweg ^{#}	End	1927–1934	
1920s	5	Cal Hubbard ‡	Tackle	1929–1933, 1935	
1920s	5	Walt Kiesling †	Guard	1935–1936	
1920s	5	Curly Lambeau ‡	Halfback	1919–29	
1920s	5	Mike Michalske ‡	Guard	1929–1935, 1937	
1930s	10	Johnny Blood ‡	Halfback	1929–1933, 1935–1936	
1930s	10	Beattie Feathers	Halfback	1940	
1930s	10	Charles Goldenberg ^{#}	Guard	1933–1945	
1930s	10	Arnie Herber ‡	Quarterback	1930–1940	
1930s	10	Clarke Hinkle ‡	Fullback	1932–1941	
1930s	10	Don Hutson ‡	Wide receiver	1935–1945	
1930s	10	Cecil Isbell ^{#}	Quarterback	1938–1942	
1930s	10	Bill Lee	Tackle	1937–1942, 1946	
1930s	10	Russ Letlow ^{#}	Guard	1936–1942, 1946	
1930s	10	George Svendsen ^{#}	Center	1935–1937, 1940–1941	
1940s	3	Charley Brock ^{#}	Center	1939–1947	
1940s	3	Tony Canadeo ‡	Halfback	1941–1944, 1946–1952	
1940s	3	Baby Ray ^{#}	Tackle	1938–1948	
1950s	2	Len Ford †	Defensive end	1958	
1950s	2	Emlen Tunnell †	Safety	1959–1961	
1960s	13	Herb Adderley ‡	Cornerback	1961–1969	
1960s	13	Don Chandler ^{#}	Punter	1965–1967	
1960s	13	Willie Davis ‡	Defensive end	1960–1969	
1960s	13	Boyd Dowler ^{#}	Wide receiver	1959–1969	
1960s	13	Forrest Gregg ‡	Tackle	1956, 1958–1970	
1960s	13	Paul Hornung ‡	Halfback	1957–1962, 1964–1966	
1960s	13	Jerry Kramer ‡	Guard	1958–1968	
1960s	13	Ray Nitschke ‡	Linebacker	1958–1972	
1960s	13	Jim Ringo ‡	Center	1953–1963	
1960s	13	Dave Robinson ‡	Linebacker	1963–1972	
1960s	13	Bart Starr ‡	Quarterback	1956–1971	
1960s	13	Jim Taylor ‡	Fullback	1958–1966	
1960s	13	Willie Wood ‡	Safety	1960–1971	
1970s	1	Ted Hendricks †	Linebacker	1974	
1980s	2	John Anderson ^{#}	Linebacker	1978–1989	
1980s	2	James Lofton ‡	Wide receiver	1978–1986	
1990s	4	LeRoy Butler ‡	Safety	1990–2001	
1990s	4	Brett Favre ‡	Quarterback	1992–2007	
1990s	4	Sean Landeta	Punter	1998	
1990s	4	Reggie White ‡	Defensive end	1993–1998	
2000s	2	Darren Sharper	Safety	1997–2004	
2000s	2	Charles Woodson ‡	Cornerback	2006–2012	
2010s	3	Jahri Evans	Guard	2017	
2010s	3	Julius Peppers †	Defensive end	2014–2016	
2010s	3	Aaron Rodgers	Quarterback	2005–2022	

== See also ==
- Lists of Green Bay Packers players
- NFL All-Time Team
  - List of Green Bay Packers NFL Anniversary All-Time Team selections
