= List of North Carolina Central Eagles in the NFL draft =

This is a list of North Carolina Central Eagles football players in the NFL draft.

== Key ==
| B | Back | K | Kicker | NT | Nose tackle |
| C | Center | LB | Linebacker | FB | Fullback |
| DB | Defensive back | P | Punter | HB | Halfback |
| DE | Defensive end | QB | Quarterback | WR | Wide receiver |
| DT | Defensive tackle | RB | Running back | G | Guard |
| E | End | T | Offensive tackle | TE | Tight end |

== Selections ==
| Year | Round | Pick | Overall | Player | Team | Position |
|---|---|---|---|---|---|---|
| 1956 | 18 | 8 | 213 | Matt Boone | New York Giants | B |
| 1958 | 5 | 7 | 56 | John Baker | Los Angeles Rams | T |
| 1959 | 30 | 8 | 356 | Cliff Jackson | Chicago Bears | B |
| 1960 | 10 | 4 | 112 | Ernie Barnes | Baltimore Colts | T |
| 1960 | 13 | 5 | 149 | Paul Winslow | Green Bay Packers | B |
| 1961 | 17 | 5 | 229 | Rossie Barfield | Chicago Bears | E |
| 1961 | 17 | 12 | 236 | Jim Brewington | Green Bay Packers | T |
| 1962 | 2 | 3 | 17 | Chuck Hinton | Cleveland Browns | T |
| 1962 | 13 | 11 | 179 | Frank Gardner | Cleveland Browns | T |
| 1962 | 15 | 5 | 201 | Vern Hatch | Pittsburgh Steelers | E |
| 1963 | 17 | 13 | 237 | Bob McAdams | New York Giants | T |
| 1964 | 8 | 9 | 107 | Bobby Currington | Pittsburgh Steelers | B |
| 1968 | 17 | 22 | 457 | Billy Alsbrooks | Houston Oilers | DB |
| 1970 | 1 | 14 | 14 | Doug Wilkerson | Houston Oilers | G |
| 1970 | 4 | 4 | 82 | Jerome Gantt | Buffalo Bills | DE |
| 1970 | 14 | 23 | 361 | Julian Martin | Dallas Cowboys | WR |
| 1971 | 10 | 3 | 237 | Russell Price | Houston Oilers | DE |
| 1973 | 6 | 11 | 141 | Jason Caldwell | Los Angeles Rams | WR |
| 1973 | 9 | 24 | 232 | Bracey Bonham | Pittsburgh Steelers | G |
| 1973 | 10 | 3 | 237 | Jeff Horsley | New Orleans Saints | RB |
| 1973 | 11 | 11 | 271 | Jeff Inmon | Los Angeles Rams | RB |
| 1974 | 3 | 19 | 71 | Mo Spencer | Atlanta Falcons | DB |
| 1974 | 12 | 16 | 302 | Ron McNeil | Cleveland Browns | DE |
| 1974 | 17 | 23 | 439 | Jim Smith | Cincinnati Bengals | RB |
| 1975 | 2 | 17 | 43 | Charles Smith | Denver Broncos | DE |
| 1975 | 13 | 13 | 325 | James Smith | Detroit Lions | RB |
| 1976 | 12 | 4 | 323 | Milton Butts | New Orleans Saints | T |
| 1977 | 4 | 11 | 95 | Darius Helton | Kansas City Chiefs | G |
| 1977 | 7 | 20 | 187 | Louis Breeden | Cincinnati Bengals | DB |
| 1977 | 12 | 2 | 309 | Charles Romes | Buffalo Bills | DB |
| 1983 | 7 | 4 | 172 | Myron Dupree | Denver Broncos | DB |
| 1983 | 11 | 8 | 287 | Ben Tate | Detroit Lions | RB |
| 1984 | 10 | 7 | 259 | William Frizzell | Detroit Lions | DB |
| 1985 | 5 | 16 | 128 | Arnold Brown | Seattle Seahawks | DB |
| 1987 | 10 | 12 | 263 | Robert Clark | New Orleans Saints | WR |
| 1989 | 2 | 18 | 46 | Robert Massey | New Orleans Saints | DB |
| 2007 | 5 | 4 | 141 | Greg Peterson | Tampa Bay Buccaneers | DE |
| 2016 | 4 | 10 | 108 | Ryan Smith | Tampa Bay Buccaneers | DB |
