= Jack Rudolph =

Jack Rudolph may refer to:

- Jack Rudolph (character), a fictional character on the U.S. television series Studio 60 on the Sunset Strip
- Jack Rudolph (American football) (1938–2019), American football player
