= List of Green Bay Packers NFL Anniversary All-Time Team selections =

Don Hutson was one of only two Packers players (the other being Forrest Gregg) selected for the 50th, 75th and 100th Anniversary Teams.

The Green Bay Packers are a professional American football team based in Green Bay, Wisconsin. The Packers have competed in the National Football League (NFL) since 1921, two years after their original founding by Curly Lambeau and George Whitney Calhoun. They are members of the North Division of the National Football Conference (NFC) and play their home games at Lambeau Field in central Wisconsin.

In 1969, the Pro Football Hall of Fame selected the NFL 50th Anniversary All-Time Team to celebrate the best players of the league's first 50 years. In addition to the 16 players named to the team, 2 runners-up were named for each of the 15 positions, for a total of 46 players. Jim Thorpe was given a special distinction "as the star that never diminishes". In 1994, the NFL 75th Anniversary All-Time Team was selected with the same purpose: to honor the best players of the league's first 75 years. Instead of the Pro Football Hall of Fame choosing the team, "a 15-person panel of NFL and Pro Football Hall of Fame officials, former players and media members" made the selections. In addition to the main team, a special "two-way team" was selected to honor players who played significant time at both offensive and defensive positions. In total, 48 players were named to the 75th Anniversary All-Time Team, with Gale Sayers being named to 2 positions (halfback and kick returner). Nineteen players were named to the "two-way team", with six of these also named to the primary team. In 2019, the Pro Football Hall of Fame continued the quadranscentennial tradition with the NFL 100th Anniversary All-Time Team, again selected by a panel of league officials, players and members of the media. In total, 100 players were named to this team, which for the first time also included head coaches; 10 head coaches were selected.

The Packers have had 15 players and two head coaches named to at least one NFL Anniversary All-Time Team. Don Hutson and Forrest Gregg were the only Packers players to be named to all three NFL Anniversary All-Time Teams, although six others were named to at least two. The 50th NFL Anniversary All-Time Team included ten Packers; the 75th NFL Anniversary All-Time Team included six Packers on the primary team and three on the special "two-way team" (Hutson was named to both); and the 100th NFL Anniversary All-Time Team included nine Packers. Twelve of the Packers' selections have been inducted into the Pro Football Hall of Fame and Green Bay Packers Hall of Fame. Three players (Len Ford, Ted Hendricks and Emlen Tunnell) were inducted into just the Pro Football Hall of Fame, while another two (Boyd Dowler and Ron Kramer) were only inducted into the Green Bay Packers Hall of Fame.

== Team selections ==
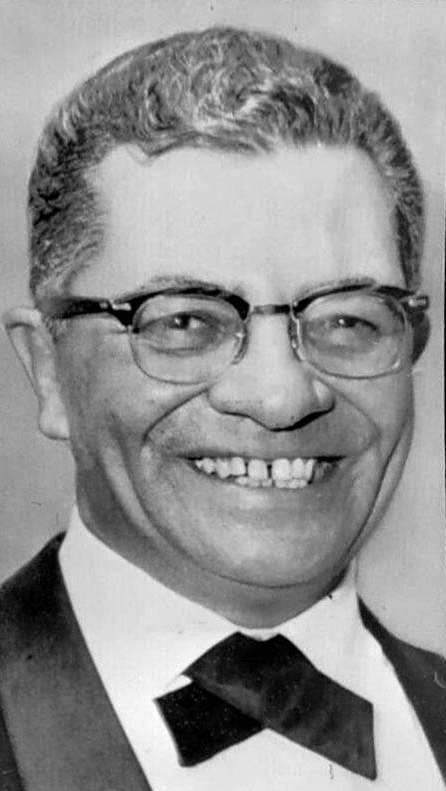
Vince Lombardi was included in the NFL 100th Anniversary All-Time Team in recognition for being one of the best head coaches in NFL history.

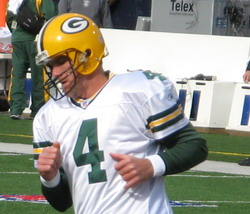
Brett Favre was one of ten quarterbacks selected for the NFL 100th Anniversary All-Time Team.

Key
^{#}	Inducted into the Green Bay Packers Hall of Fame
†	Inducted into the Pro Football Hall of Fame
‡	Inducted into the Green Bay Packers Hall of Fame and Pro Football Hall of Fame

Green Bay Packers NFL All-Anniversary Team selections
Name	Position (Note: The naming of positions has changed throughout the history of the NFL. The positions provided in this column reflect the general position they played during a majority of their career, as identified by Pro-Football-Reference.com.)	Seasons with Packers	Anniversary Team			Refs.
Name	Position	Seasons with Packers	50th	75th	100th	Refs.
Herb Adderley ‡	Cornerback	1961–69	Runner-up			
Boyd Dowler ^{#}	Flanker	1959–69	Runner-up			
Brett Favre ‡	Quarterback	1992–2007			Primary	
Len Ford †	Defensive end	1958	Runner-up			
Forrest Gregg ‡	Tackle	1956, 1958–70	Runner-up	Primary	Primary	
Ted Hendricks †	Linebacker	1974		Primary	Primary	
Clarke Hinkle ‡	Fullback	1932–41		Two-way		
Cal Hubbard ‡	Tackle	1929–33, 1935	Primary	Two-way		
Don Hutson ‡	End	1935–45	Primary	Primary	Primary	
Don Hutson ‡	End	1935–45	Primary	Two-way	Primary	
Jerry Kramer ‡	Guard	1958–68	Primary			
Ron Kramer ^{#}	Tight end	1957, 1959–64	Runner-up			
Curly Lambeau ‡	Head coach	1919–49			Primary	
Vince Lombardi ‡	Head coach	1959–67			Primary	
Ray Nitschke ‡	Linebacker	1958–72	Primary	Primary		
Jan Stenerud ‡	Placekicker	1980–83		Primary	Primary	
Emlen Tunnell †	Safety	1959–61	Primary		Primary	
Reggie White ‡	Defensive end	1993–98		Primary	Primary	

== See also ==
- Lists of Green Bay Packers players
- NFL All-Decade Teams
  - List of Green Bay Packers NFL All-Decade Team selections
