= Ben Donnell =

Ben Donnell may refer to:

- Ben Donnell (American football)
- Ben Donnell (rugby union)
