= 1959 NFL draft =

National Football League draft

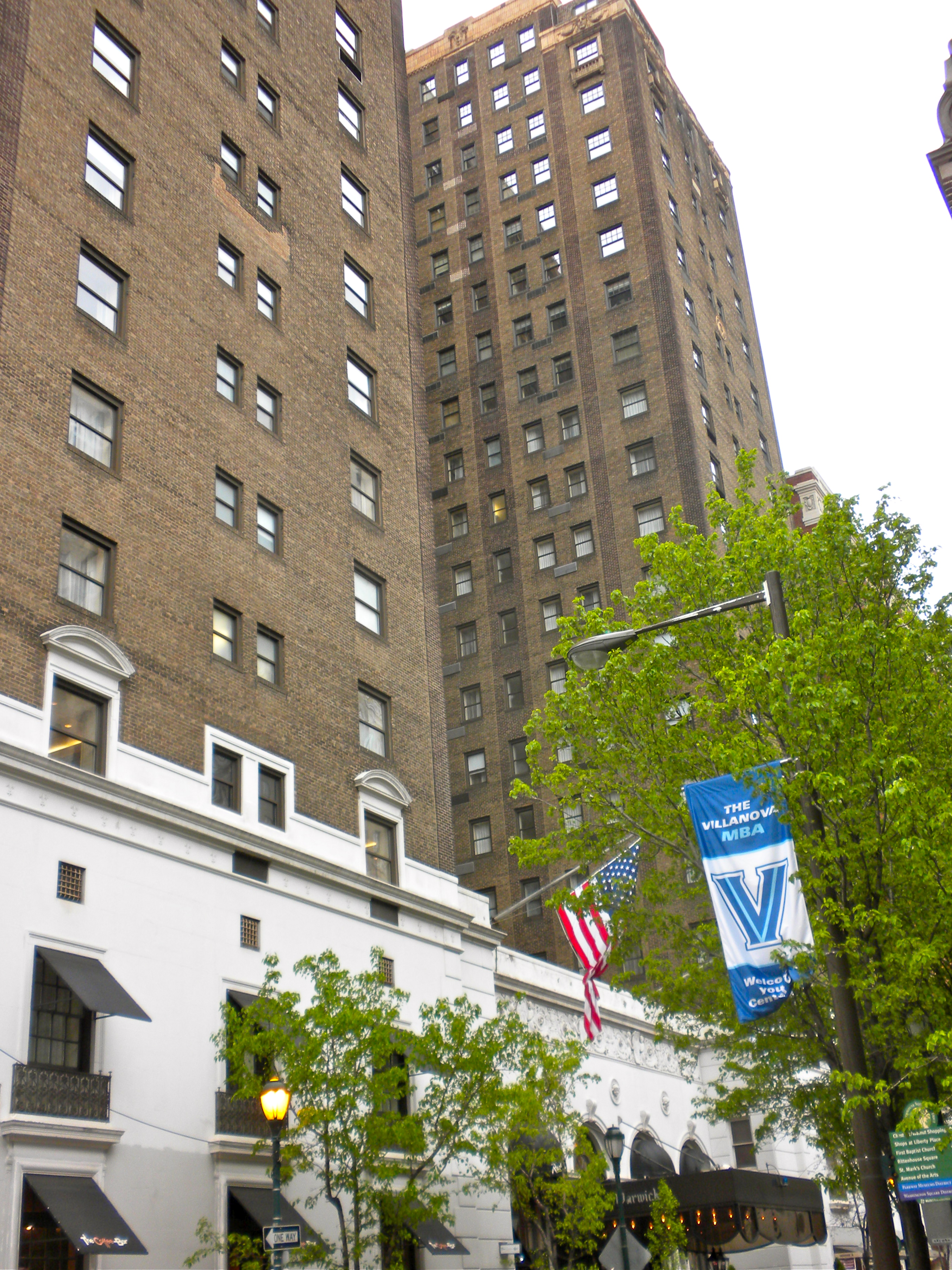
- The Warwick (location of the draft), photographed in 2010

General information
- Dates: December 1, 1958 & January 21, 1959
- Location: Warwick Hotel in Philadelphia, Pennsylvania

Overview
- 360 total selections in 30 rounds
- League: NFL
- First selection: Randy Duncan, QB; Green Bay Packers
- Mr. Irrelevant: Blair Weese, B Baltimore Colts
- Most selections (35): Los Angeles Rams
- Fewest selections (23): Pittsburgh Steelers
- Hall of Famers: 1: CB Dick LeBeau

The 1959 NFL draft had its first four rounds held on December 1, 1958, and its final twenty-six rounds on January 21, 1959. Both sessions were held at the Warwick Hotel in Philadelphia. With the first overall pick in the draft, the Green Bay Packers selected quarterback Randy Duncan.

== Player selections ==
= Pro Bowler	= Hall of Famer

=== Round 1 ===
Pick #	NFL team	Player	Position	College
1	Green Bay Packers	Randy Duncan	Quarterback	Iowa
2	Los Angeles Rams	Dick Bass	Running back	Pacific
3	Chicago Cardinals	Billy Stacy	Safety	Mississippi State
4	Washington Redskins	Don Allard	Quarterback	Boston College
5	San Francisco 49ers	Dave Baker	Defensive back	Oklahoma
6	Detroit Lions	Nick Pietrosante	Fullback	Notre Dame
7	Chicago Bears	Don Clark	Running back	Ohio State
8	San Francisco 49ers	Dan James	Tackle	Ohio State
9	Los Angeles Rams	Paul Dickson	Defensive tackle	Baylor
10	New York Giants	Lee Grosscup	Quarterback	Utah
11	Cleveland Browns	Rich Kreitling	Wide receiver	Illinois
12	Baltimore Colts	Jackie Burkett	Center	Auburn

=== Round 2 ===
Pick #	NFL team	Player	Position	College
13	Green Bay Packers	Alex Hawkins	Back	South Carolina
14	Chicago Cardinals	Jerry Wilson	End	Auburn
15	Philadelphia Eagles	J. D. Smith	Tackle	Rice
16	Los Angeles Rams	Buddy Humphrey	Quarterback	Baylor
17	San Francisco 49ers	Bob Harrison	Center	Oklahoma
18	Detroit Lions	Charley Horton	Guard	Baylor
19	Detroit Lions	Mike Rabold	Tackle	Indiana
20	Los Angeles Rams	Don Brown	Back	Houston
21	Chicago Bears	Richie Petitbon	Quarterback	Tulane
22	New York Giants	Buddy Dial	End	Rice
23	Cleveland Browns	Dick Schafrath	Guard	Ohio State
24	Baltimore Colts	Dave Sherer	End	Southern Methodist

=== Round 3 ===
Pick #	NFL team	Player	Position	College
25	Green Bay Packers	Boyd Dowler	Back	Colorado
26	Philadelphia Eagles	Wray Carlton	Back	Duke
27	Chicago Cardinals	Jimmy Butler	Back	Vanderbilt
28	Washington Redskins	Emil Karas	Tackle	Dayton
29	San Francisco 49ers	Eddie Dove	Back	Colorado
30	Detroit Lions	Ron Koes	Center	North Carolina
31	Los Angeles Rams	Larry Hickman	Back	Baylor
32	Chicago Bears	Pete Johnson	Back	Virginia Military Inst
33	Los Angeles Rams	Tom Franckhauser	End	Purdue
34	New York Giants	Joe Morrison	Back	Cincinnati
35	Cleveland Browns	Fran O'Brien	Tackle	Michigan State
36	Detroit Lions	Ron Luciano	Tackle	Syracuse

=== Round 4 ===
Pick #	NFL team	Player	Position	College
37	Cleveland Browns	Gary Prahst	End	Michigan
38	Chicago Cardinals	Ken Beck	Tackle	Texas A&M
39	Philadelphia Eagles	Jim Grazione	Quarterback	Villanova
40	Washington Redskins	Jim Wood	End	Oklahoma State
41	San Francisco 49ers	Monte Clark	Tackle	USC
42	Detroit Lions	Art Brandriff	Back	Virginia Military Inst
43	Los Angeles Rams	Blanche Martin	Back	Michigan State
44	Los Angeles Rams	John Tracey	End	Texas A&M
45	Los Angeles Rams	Bob Reifsnyder	Tackle	Navy
46	Detroit Lions	Bob Grottkau	Guard	Oregon State
47	Cleveland Browns	Dave Lloyd	Linebacker	Georgia
48	Baltimore Colts	Zeke Smith	Guard	Auburn

=== Round 5 ===
Pick #	NFL team	Player	Position	College
49	Washington Redskins	Bob Wetoska	Tackle	Notre Dame
50	Chicago Cardinals	Maury Schleicher	End	Penn State
51	Philadelphia Eagles	Nick Mumley	Tackle	Purdue
52	Chicago Cardinals	Ted Bates	Tackle	Oregon State
53	Cleveland Browns	John Wooten	Guard	Colorado
54	San Francisco 49ers	Frank Geremia	Tackle	Notre Dame
55	Green Bay Packers	Andy Cvercko	Center	Northwestern
56	Los Angeles Rams	John Lands	End	Montana State
57	Chicago Bears	John Adams	Back	Cal State-Los Angeles
58	Cleveland Browns	Dick LeBeau	Cornerback	Ohio State
59	New York Giants	Ellison Kelly	Guard	Michigan State
60	Baltimore Colts	Don Churchwell	Guard	Mississippi

=== Round 6 ===
Pick #	NFL team	Player	Position	College
61	Green Bay Packers	Willie Taylor	Center	Florida A&M
62	Philadelphia Eagles	Al Benecick	Guard	Syracuse
63	Chicago Cardinals	Tom Redmond	Tackle	Vanderbilt
64	Chicago Cardinals	Mac Lewis	Tackle	Iowa
65	Washington Redskins	Jim McFalls	Tackle	Virginia Military Inst
66	San Francisco 49ers	Tony Bavaro	Tackle	Holy Cross
67	Detroit Lions	Dick Guesman	Tackle	West Virginia
68	Chicago Bears	Fred Cole	Guard	Maryland
69	Los Angeles Rams	Dave Painter	Center	Tulane
70	Cleveland Browns	Jim Prestel	Tackle	Idaho
71	Cleveland Browns	Bob Denton	End	Pacific
72	Baltimore Colts	Palmer Pyle	Tackle	Michigan State

=== Round 7 ===
Pick #	NFL team	Player	Position	College
73	Green Bay Packers	Bobby Jackson	Back	Alabama
74	San Francisco 49ers	Don Rogers	Tackle	South Carolina
75	Chicago Bears	Jim Tucker	End	Tennessee-Chattanooga
76	Washington Redskins	Don Lawrence	Tackle	Notre Dame
77	Detroit Lions	Ben Donnell	Center	Vanderbilt
78	San Francisco 49ers	Daniel Colchico	End	San Jose State
79	Washington Redskins	Mitch Ogiego	Quarterback	Iowa
80	Los Angeles Rams	Eddie Meador	Back	Arkansas Tech
81	Washington Redskins	Jim Kenney	End	Boston University
82	Cleveland Browns	Gene Miller	Tackle	Rice
83	Green Bay Packers	Gary Raid	Tackle	Willamette
84	Baltimore Colts	Hal Lewis	Back	Houston

=== Round 8 ===
Pick #	NFL team	Player	Position	College
85	Green Bay Packers	Buddy Mayfield	End	South Carolina
86	Philadelphia Eagles	Willmer Fowler	Back	Northwestern
87	Cleveland Browns	Bob Ptacek	Quarterback	Michigan
88	Detroit Lions	Jim Lenden	Tackle	Oregon
89	Washington Redskins	Gene O'Pella	End	Villanova
90	San Francisco 49ers	Lew Aiken	End	Vanderbilt
91	Pittsburgh Steelers	Tom Barnett	Back	Purdue
92	Chicago Bears	Dick Clark	Back	Baylor
93	Los Angeles Rams	Bill Conner	End	Jackson State
94	Chicago Bears	Willie Smith	Tackle	Michigan
95	Green Bay Packers	Bob Laraba	Back	Texas-El Paso
96	Baltimore Colts	Tommy Joe Coffey	Back	West Texas State

=== Round 9 ===
Pick #	NFL team	Player	Position	College
97	Green Bay Packers	George Dixon	Back	Bridgeport
98	Chicago Cardinals	Gary Ferguson	Tackle	Southern Methodist
99	Philadelphia Eagles	Gene Johnson	Back	Cincinnati
100	Washington Redskins	Dick Haley	Back	Pittsburgh
101	Detroit Lions	Carl Smith	Back	Tennessee
102	San Francisco 49ers	Bobby Joe Green	Back	Florida
103	Pittsburgh Steelers	Hal Davis	Guard	Houston
104	Los Angeles Rams	Larry Cundiff	Tackle	Michigan State
105	Chicago Bears	Maury Youmans	Tackle	Syracuse
106	Cleveland Browns	Kirk Wilson	Back	UCLA
107	New York Giants	Jack Delveaux	Back	Illinois
108	Baltimore Colts	Tom Brown	Guard	Minnesota

=== Round 10 ===
Pick #	NFL team	Player	Position	College
109	Green Bay Packers	Sam Tuccio	Tackle	Southern Mississippi
110	Philadelphia Eagles	Rollie West	Back	Villanova
111	Chicago Cardinals	Emil DeCantis	Back	North Carolina
112	Detroit Lions	Jack Laraway	Back	Purdue
113	Washington Redskins	Ron Toth	Back	Notre Dame
114	San Francisco 49ers	Bronko Nagurski	Tackle	Notre Dame
115	Pittsburgh Steelers	Riley Gunnels	Tackle	Georgia
116	Chicago Bears	Bob Coronado	End	Pacific
117	Los Angeles Rams	Alan Goldstein	End	North Carolina
118	New York Giants	Bob Pepe	End	North Carolina State
119	Cleveland Browns	Bob Zeman	Back	Wisconsin
120	Baltimore Colts	Don Stewart	End	Southern Methodist

=== Round 11 ===
Pick #	NFL team	Player	Position	College
121	Green Bay Packers	Bob Webb	Back	St. Ambrose
122	Chicago Cardinals	Floyd Faucette	Back	Georgia Tech
123	Philadelphia Eagles	Art Powell	Wide receiver	San Jose State
124	Washington Redskins	Gerry Marciniak	Guard	Michigan
125	Detroit Lions	Harry Jacobs	Guard	Bradley
126	San Francisco 49ers	Jack Hayes	Back	Trinity (TX)
127	Pittsburgh Steelers	Overton Curtis	Back	Utah State
128	Los Angeles Rams	Joe Kelly	Back	New Mexico State
129	Chicago Bears	Ed Gray	Tackle	North Texas State
130	Cleveland Browns	Jerry King	Guard	Kent State
131	New York Giants	Bob Sawyer	Back	Wyoming
132	Baltimore Colts	Tom Stephens	Back	Syracuse

=== Round 12 ===
Pick #	NFL team	Player	Position	College
133	Green Bay Packers	Larry Hall	Guard	Missouri Valley
134	Philadelphia Eagles	Howard Keys	Tackle	Oklahoma State
135	Chicago Cardinals	Ted Edmondson	End	Hardin–Simmons
136	Detroit Lions	Ron Stehouwer	Tackle	Colorado State
137	Washington Redskins	Roger Wypyszynski	Tackle	St. Norbert
138	San Francisco 49ers	Bill Korutz	Center	Dayton
139	Pittsburgh Steelers	Bill Pavliska	Back	Baylor
140	Chicago Bears	Justin Rowland	End	Texas Christian
141	Los Angeles Rams	Mike Connelly	Center	Utah State
142	New York Giants	Charlie Flowers	Back	Mississippi
143	Cleveland Browns	Frank Palandrani	Tackle	North Carolina State
144	Baltimore Colts	Dick Wood	Quarterback	Auburn

=== Round 13 ===
Pick #	NFL team	Player	Position	College
145	Green Bay Packers	Jim Hurd	Back	Albion
146	Chicago Cardinals	Pat Lamberti	End	Richmond
147	Philadelphia Eagles	Dick Stillwagon	Back	Purdue
148	Washington Redskins	Billy Shoemake	End	Louisiana State
149	Detroit Lions	Jim Steffen	Back	UCLA
150	San Francisco 49ers	Bill Lopasky	Guard	West Virginia
151	Pittsburgh Steelers	Dewey Bohling	Back	Hardin–Simmons
152	Los Angeles Rams	Al Witcher	End	Baylor
153	Chicago Bears	Gene Jones	Back	Rice
154	Cleveland Browns	Ray Reese	Back	Bowling Green
155	New York Giants	John Kompara	Tackle	South Carolina
156	Baltimore Colts	Rudi Smith	Tackle	Mississippi

=== Round 14 ===
Pick #	NFL team	Player	Position	College
157	Green Bay Packers	Ken Kerr	Guard	Arizona State
158	Philadelphia Eagles	Jack Smith	Tackle	Clemson
159	Chicago Cardinals	Bob Bobo	Tackle	Texas-El Paso
160	Detroit Lions	Jim Baldwin	Center	McMurry
161	Washington Redskins	Kurt Schwarz	Guard	Maryland
162	San Francisco 49ers	Mike Dukes	Back	Clemson
163	Pittsburgh Steelers	John Peppercorn	End	Kansas
164	Chicago Bears	Joe Robb	Tackle	Texas Christian
165	Los Angeles Rams	Pete Davidson	Tackle	The Citadel
166	New York Giants	Roger Ellis	Center	Maine
167	Cleveland Browns	Elbert "Golden Wheels" Dubenion	Wide receiver	Bluffton
168	Baltimore Colts	Ferdie Burket	Back	Southeastern Oklahoma

=== Round 15 ===
Pick #	NFL team	Player	Position	College
169	Green Bay Packers	Dick Teteak	Guard	Wisconsin
170	Chicago Cardinals	John Schroeder	End	North Carolina
171	Philadelphia Eagles	Jim Poteete	Center	Mississippi State
172	Washington Redskins	Fred Hood	End	Northeastern Oklahoma
173	Detroit Lions	Bruce Maher	Back	Detroit
174	San Francisco 49ers	Joe Belland	Back	Arizona State
175	Pittsburgh Steelers	J.W. "Red" Brodnax	Back	Louisiana State
176	Los Angeles Rams	Walt Kelly	Back	Houston
177	Chicago Bears	Roger LeClerc	Center	Trinity (CT)
178	Cleveland Browns	Tom Salwocki	Center	Pittsburgh
179	New York Giants	Bob Bercich	Back	Michigan State
180	Baltimore Colts	Ted Foret	Tackle	Auburn

=== Round 16 ===
Pick #	NFL team	Player	Position	College
181	Green Bay Packers	Dan Edgington	End	Florida
182	Philadelphia Eagles	Ken Paduch	Tackle	Auburn
183	Chicago Cardinals	John Dingens	Tackle	Detroit
184	Detroit Lions	George McGee	Tackle	Southern
185	Washington Redskins	Dick Splain	Tackle	New Haven
186	San Francisco 49ers	Bob Cook	Back	Idaho State
187	Pittsburgh Steelers	Bill Carrico	Guard	North Texas State
188	Chicago Bears	Don Redding	Tackle	North Carolina
189	Los Angeles Rams	Ted Royal	Center	Duke
190	New York Giants	Bob Soltis	Back	Minnesota
191	Cleveland Browns	Jamie Caleb	Back	Grambling
192	Baltimore Colts	Morris Keller	Tackle	Clemson

=== Round 17 ===
Pick #	NFL team	Player	Position	College
193	Green Bay Packers	Tom Secules	Back	William & Mary
194	Chicago Cardinals	Pete Hart	Back	Hardin–Simmons
195	Philadelphia Eagles	Bill Craig	Tackle	Villanova
196	Washington Redskins	Jim Healy	Guard	Holy Cross
197	Detroit Lions	Jack Rudolph	End	Georgia Tech
198	San Francisco 49ers	Jerome Jurczak	Center	Benedictine
199	Pittsburgh Steelers	Bill Leeka	Tackle	UCLA
200	Los Angeles Rams	Dave Wilemon	Tackle	Southern Methodist
201	Chicago Bears	Willie Neal	Back	Jackson State
202	Cleveland Browns	Homer Schmittan	End	Tennessee Tech
203	New York Giants	Austin "Goose" Gonsoulin	End	Baylor
204	Baltimore Colts	Leroy Bergan	Tackle	South Dakota State

=== Round 18 ===
Pick #	NFL team	Player	Position	College
205	Green Bay Packers	Dick Nearents	Tackle	Eastern Washington
206	Philadelphia Eagles	Jim Benson	Back	Georgia Tech
207	Chicago Cardinals	Darrell DeDecker	Tackle	Illinois
208	Detroit Lions	Dave Holden	Tackle	Cal State-Los Angeles
209	Washington Redskins	Joe Kapp	Quarterback	California
210	San Francisco 49ers	Jack Cowley	Tackle	Trinity (TX)
211	Pittsburgh Steelers	John Seinturier	Tackle	USC
212	Chicago Bears	Ken Asbury	Back	Missouri Valley
213	Los Angeles Rams	Dave Van Metre	End	Colorado College
214	New York Giants	Al Ecuyer	Guard	Notre Dame
215	Cleveland Browns	Ed Hill	Guard	Miami (OH)
216	Baltimore Colts	Opie Bandy	Tackle	Tulsa

=== Round 19 ===
Pick #	NFL team	Player	Position	College
217	Green Bay Packers	Bill Butler	Back	Tennessee-Chattanooga
218	Chicago Cardinals	Billy Dunn	Back	Southern Methodist
219	Philadelphia Eagles	Alan Miller	Back	Boston College
220	Washington Redskins	Bobby Lauder	Back	Auburn
221	Detroit Lions	Rufus Granderson	Tackle	Prairie View A&M
222	San Francisco 49ers	Tom Osborne	Back	Hastings
223	Pittsburgh Steelers	Dave Kocourek	Wide receiver	Wisconsin
224	Los Angeles Rams	Carver Shannon	Back	Southern Illinois
225	Chicago Bears	Chris Plain	Tackle	Stanford
226	Cleveland Browns	Joe Schroeder	Tackle	Xavier
227	New York Giants	George Scott	Back	Miami (OH)
228	Baltimore Colts	Milt Crain	Center	Mississippi

=== Round 20 ===
Pick #	NFL team	Player	Position	College
229	Green Bay Packers	Charley Sample	Back	Arkansas
230	Philadelphia Eagles	Jim Payne	Guard	Clemson
231	Chicago Cardinals	Jerry Lee Murphy	Tackle	Ohio State
232	Detroit Lions	Dan McGrew	Tackle	Purdue
233	Washington Redskins	Billy Brewer	Back	Mississippi
234	San Francisco 49ers	Toby Deese	Tackle	Georgia Tech
235	Pittsburgh Steelers	Rudy Hayes	Back	Clemson
236	Chicago Bears	Tony Carcaterra	End	Elon
237	Los Angeles Rams	Ross Coyle	End	Oklahoma
238	New York Giants	Jerry Shetler	Guard	Minnesota
239	Cleveland Browns	Al McClain	Tackle	Shaw
240	Baltimore Colts	Paul Balonick	Center	North Carolina State

=== Round 21 ===
Pick #	NFL team	Player	Position	College
241	Green Bay Packers	Dave Smith	Back	Ripon
242	Chicago Cardinals	Dale Memmelaar	Guard	Wyoming
243	Philadelphia Eagles	Bob Salerno	Guard	Colorado
244	Washington Redskins	Mel Reight	Back	West Virginia
245	Detroit Lions	Buddy Davis	Back	Richmond
246	San Francisco 49ers	Luther Carr	Back	Washington
247	Pittsburgh Steelers	Johnny Green	Quarterback	Tennessee-Chattanooga
248	Los Angeles Rams	Marv Bergmann	Tackle	Washington
249	Chicago Bears	Donnie Stone	Back	Arkansas
250	Cleveland Browns	Jim Fraser	Guard	Wisconsin
251	New York Giants	Fred Swearingen	Guard	North Carolina
252	Baltimore Colts	John Hernstein	Back	Michigan

=== Round 22 ===
Pick #	NFL team	Player	Position	College
253	Green Bay Packers	Charlie Anderson	End	Drake
254	Philadelphia Eagles	Jim Bowie	Tackle	Kentucky
255	Chicago Cardinals	Glenn Shamblin	Back	West Virginia
256	Detroit Lions	Lebron Shields	Tackle	Tennessee
257	Washington Redskins	Art Gob	End	Pittsburgh
258	San Francisco 49ers	Burnio McQueen	End	North Carolina A&T
259	Pittsburgh Steelers	Burley Polk	Tackle	Hardin–Simmons
260	Chicago Bears	Lennie Rubal	Back	William & Mary
261	Los Angeles Rams	Bill Meglen	Guard	Utah State
262	New York Giants	Gale Gibson	End	Iowa State
263	Cleveland Browns	Joe Wenzel	End	Lehigh
264	Baltimore Colts	Lonny Leatherman	End	Texas Christian

=== Round 23 ===
Pick #	NFL team	Player	Position	College
265	Green Bay Packers	Ben Lawver	Tackle	Lewis & Clark
266	Chicago Cardinals	Freddie Glick	Defensive back	Colorado State
267	Philadelphia Eagles	Dick Williams	End	Southern
268	Washington Redskins	Clarence Alexander	Back	Southeastern Louisiana
269	Detroit Lions	Sal Cesario	Tackle	Denver
270	San Francisco 49ers	Bruce Dollahan	Tackle	Illinois
271	Pittsburgh Steelers	Emye Davis	Back	McMurry
272	Los Angeles Rams	George Deiderich	Guard	Vanderbilt
273	Chicago Bears	Bob Haller	Tackle	Northwest Missouri State
274	Cleveland Browns	Jim Gardner	Tackle	Duke
275	New York Giants	Frank Kremblas	Quarterback	Ohio State
276	Baltimore Colts	Bob Davis	Back	Houston

=== Round 24 ===
Pick #	NFL team	Player	Position	College
277	Green Bay Packers	Joe Hergert	Center	Florida
278	Philadelphia Eagles	Gerry Benn	Tackle	Oklahoma State
279	Chicago Cardinals	Jim Reed	Guard	East Texas State
280	Detroit Lions	Fred Riddle	Back	Pittsburgh
281	Washington Redskins	George Darrah	Back	Franklin & Marshall
282	San Francisco 49ers	Craig Chudy	End	UCLA
283	Pittsburgh Steelers	Wayne Farmer	Tackle	Purdue
284	Chicago Bears	Bob Spain	Tackle	Baylor
285	Los Angeles Rams	Tom Campbell	Back	Indiana
286	New York Giants	Charley James	Back	Missouri
287	Cleveland Browns	Russ Goings	Guard	Xavier
288	Baltimore Colts	Bob Novogratz	Guard	Army

=== Round 25 ===
Pick #	NFL team	Player	Position	College
289	Green Bay Packers	Leroy Hardee	Back	Florida A&M
290	Chicago Cardinals	Jim Jeffery	Tackle	Auburn
291	Philadelphia Eagles	Dick Jamieson	Quarterback	Bradley
292	Washington Redskins	Bob Sargent	Tackle	Colby
293	Detroit Lions	Dan Chamberlain	End	Cal State-Sacramento
294	San Francisco 49ers	Roy Gee	Guard	Trinity (TX)
295	Pittsburgh Steelers	Ron Miller	End	Vanderbilt
296	Los Angeles Rams	Bob Borah	End	Houston
297	Chicago Bears	Tom Huhn	Center	St. Joseph's (IN)
298	Cleveland Browns	Ernie Spycholski	Tackle	Ohio State
299	New York Giants	Lou Reale	Center	Buffalo
300	Baltimore Colts	Ed Kieffer	Back	Syracuse

=== Round 26 ===
Pick #	NFL team	Player	Position	College
301	Green Bay Packers	Ken Higginbotham	End	Trinity (TX)
302	Philadelphia Eagles	Jim Burks	Tackle	Virginia Tech
303	Chicago Cardinals	Joe Chuha	Center	USC
304	Detroit Lions	Jim Bradley	Back	Lincoln (MO)
305	Washington Redskins	Gene Grabosky	Tackle	Syracuse
306	San Francisco 49ers	Ed Young	End	Louisville
307	Pittsburgh Steelers	Jack Scott	Tackle	Ohio State
308	Chicago Bears	Bob Kunde	Tackle	Capital
309	Los Angeles Rams	Bill Strumke	Back	Georgia
310	New York Giants	Frank Doretti	Center	California
311	Cleveland Browns	Homer Floyd	Back	Kansas
312	Baltimore Colts	Rene Lorio	Back	Southern Mississippi

=== Round 27 ===
Pick #	NFL team	Player	Position	College
313	Green Bay Packers	Timothy Brown	Running back	Ball State
314	Chicago Cardinals	Bob Corrigan	Guard	Indiana
315	Philadelphia Eagles	Lowell Jenkins	Tackle	Wisconsin
316	Washington Redskins	Norm Odyniec	Back	Notre Dame
317	Detroit Lions	Bill Jerry	Tackle	South Carolina
318	San Francisco 49ers	Mel Semenko	Tackle	Colorado
319	Pittsburgh Steelers	Charley Tolar	Back	Northwestern State (LA)
320	Los Angeles Rams	Alex Kroll	Center	Rutgers
321	Chicago Bears	John Aveni	End	Indiana
322	Cleveland Browns	Larry Baker	Tackle	Bowling Green
323	New York Giants	Joe Biscaha	End	Richmond
324	Baltimore Colts	Terry Thurman	Back	Rice

=== Round 28 ===
Pick #	NFL team	Player	Position	College
325	Green Bay Packers	Jerry Epps	Guard	West Texas State
326	Philadelphia Eagles	Leo Sexton	End	Auburn
327	Chicago Cardinals	Don Fleming	Defensive back	Florida
328	Detroit Lions	Vince Matthews	Back	Texas
329	Washington Redskins	Bill Austin	Back	Rutgers
330	San Francisco 49ers	Mike McCluskey	Back	Washington
331	Pittsburgh Steelers	Ronnie Hall	Back	Missouri Valley
332	Chicago Bears	Bob Williams	Back	Notre Dame
333	Los Angeles Rams	Rafer Johnson	Back	UCLA
334	New York Giants	Dolphus Williams	Tackle	Morgan State
335	Cleveland Browns	Pete Abadie	End	Tulane
336	Baltimore Colts	Fred Long	Back	Iowa

=== Round 29 ===
Pick #	NFL team	Player	Position	College
337	Green Bay Packers	Jack Flara	Back	Pittsburgh
338	Chicago Cardinals	Jim O'Connor	Center	Marshall
339	Philadelphia Eagles	John Stolte	Tackle	Kansas State
340	Washington Redskins	Don Lockwood	Guard	Tulane
341	Detroit Lions	Dave Sime	End	Duke
342	San Francisco 49ers	Jack Bolton	Tackle	Puget Sound
343	Pittsburgh Steelers	Dick Loncar	Tackle	Notre Dame
344	Los Angeles Rams	Ernie Moore	End	Alabama State
345	Chicago Bears	Eddie Southern	End	Texas
346	Cleveland Browns	Ron Nietupski	Tackle	Illinois
347	New York Giants	Henry Christopher	End	Southern Methodist
348	Baltimore Colts	Perry McGriff	End	Florida

=== Round 30 ===
Pick #	NFL team	Player	Position	College
349	Green Bay Packers	Dick Emerich	Tackle	West Chester
350	Philadelphia Eagles	Angelo Mosca	Tackle	Notre Dame
351	Chicago Cardinals	Rabe Walton	Back	North Carolina
352	Detroit Lions	Ron Stover	End	Oregon
353	Washington Redskins	Jim Colclough	Back	Boston College
354	San Francisco 49ers	Bob Carter	Tackle	Denver
355	Pittsburgh Steelers	Willus Fjerstad	Back	Minnesota
356	Chicago Bears	Cliff Jackson	Back	North Carolina Central
357	Los Angeles Rams	Don Millich	Back	Washington
358	New York Giants	Dave Sington	Tackle	Alabama
359	Cleveland Browns	Carl Ketchie	Back	Washington State
360	Baltimore Colts	Blair Weese	Back	West Virginia Tech

= Pro Bowler

== Hall of Famers ==
- Dick LeBeau, defensive back from Ohio State University taken 5th round 58th overall by the Cleveland Browns.

Inducted: Professional Football Hall of Fame class of 2010.

== Notable undrafted players ==
^{†}	= Pro Bowler

= Hall of Famer

Original NFL team	Player	Pos.	College	Notes
Chicago Bears	Lionel Taylor ^{†}	WR	New Mexico Highlands	
Los Angeles Rams	John LoVetere ^{†}	DT	Compton Junior College	
San Francisco 49ers	Paul Lowe ^{†}	RB	Oregon State	
Washington Redskins	Tom Flores^{‡}	QB	Pacific	
Washington Redskins	Ben Scotti	S	Maryland	
