= Cliff Jackson =

Cliff Jackson may refer to:

- Cliff Jackson (musician) (1902–1970), American jazz stride pianist
- Cliff Jackson (footballer) (1941–2018), English footballer
- Cliff Jackson (Canadian football) (born 1930s), Canadian football player
- Cliff Jackson (Bill Clinton critic), figure in Troopergate (1993)
