= Hal Lewis (American football, born 1935) =

American football player (1935–2014)

No. 43, 27, 21
- Positions: Fullback, halfback, defensive back

Personal information
- Born: September 22, 1935; Houston, Texas, U.S.
- Died: December 14, 2014 (aged 79); Pampa, Texas, U.S.
- Listed height: 6 ft 0 in (1.83 m)
- Listed weight: 200 lb (91 kg)

Career information
- High school: Pampa
- College: Houston (1955–1958)
- NFL draft: 1959: 7th round, 84th overall pick

Career history
- Baltimore Colts (1959); Buffalo Bills (1960); Oakland Raiders (1962)

Awards and highlights
- NFL champion (1959)

Career NFL/AFL statistics
- Rushing yards: 20
- Rushing average: 1.5
- Receptions: 10
- Receiving yards: 107
- Stats at Pro Football Reference

Harold Lee Lewis (September 22, 1935 – December 14, 2014) was an American football halfback who played for the Baltimore Colts, Buffalo Bills and Oakland Raiders. He played college football at the University of Houston, having previously attended Pampa High School.
