= Homer Floyd =

American gridiron football player (born 1936)

Profile
- Position: Halfback

Personal information
- Born: May 16, 1936 (age 90); Wetumpka, Alabama, U.S.
- Listed height: 5 ft 10 in (1.78 m)
- Listed weight: 185 lb (84 kg)

Career information
- High school: Massillon (OH) Washington
- College: Kansas
- NFL draft: 1959: 26th round, 311th overall pick

Career history
- 1959: Edmonton Eskimos

Awards and highlights
- First-team All-Big Eight (1958); 2× Second-team All-Big Eight (1956, 1957)

Homer Floyd (born May 16, 1936) is an American former professional football who played for the Edmonton Eskimos. He played college football at the University of Kansas.
