= John Wooten =

American football player and executive (born 1936)

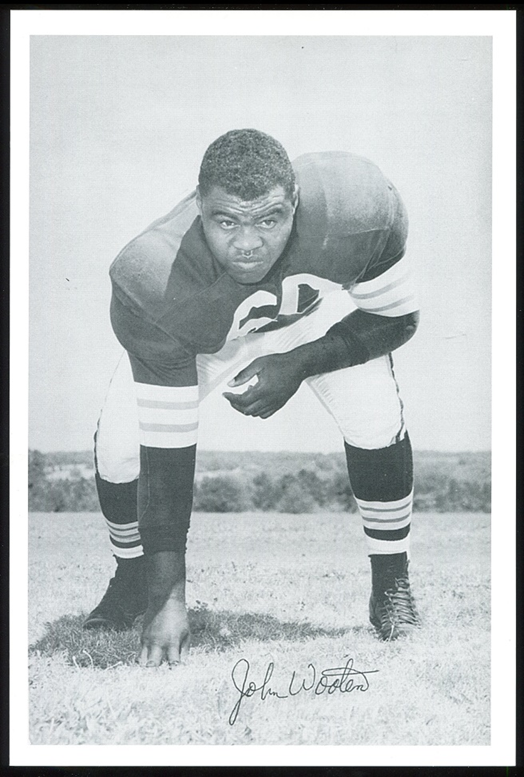
- Wooten in 1961

No. 60, 67
- Position: Guard

Personal information
- Born: December 5, 1936 (age 89); Riverview, Texas, U.S.
- Listed height: 6 ft 2 in (1.88 m)
- Listed weight: 235 lb (107 kg)

Career information
- High school: Carlsbad (Carlsbad, New Mexico)
- College: Colorado
- NFL draft: 1959: 5th round, 53rd overall pick

Career history

Playing
- Cleveland Browns (1959–1967); Washington Redskins (1968)

Operations
- Dallas Cowboys (1975–1991); Philadelphia Eagles (1992–1996); Baltimore Ravens (1997–2003)

Awards and highlights
- As a player: NFL champion (1964); First-team All-Pro (1966); 2× Pro Bowl (1965, 1966); Cleveland Browns Legends; First-team All-American (1958); First-team All-Big Eight (1957); Second-team All-Big Eight (1958); As an executive: 2× Super Bowl champion (XII, XXXV)

Career NFL statistics
- Games played: 136
- Games started: 107
- Fumble recoveries: 3
- Stats at Pro Football Reference
- College Football Hall of Fame

John B. Wooten (born December 5, 1936) is an American former professional football player who was a guard for nine seasons in the National Football League (NFL) for the Cleveland Browns and Washington Redskins. Wooten played college football for the Colorado Buffaloes and was selected in the fifth round of the 1959 NFL draft.

== Early life ==
Wooten was born in Riverview, Texas. His family then moved to Carlsbad, New Mexico and he attended segregated schools through the 9th grade, before attending the newly-integrated Carlsbad High School. Wooten first played high school football as a sophomore in 1952, and he eventually earned All-State honors in football and basketball. He received offers to play football at Dartmouth College, Florida A&M University, UCLA, the University of New Mexico and New Mexico State University, but chose to go to the University of Colorado at Boulder instead.

== College career ==
Wooten attended and played college football at the University of Colorado at Boulder. He joined the team in 1955 and became the second African-American varsity football player in the program's history (Franklin Clarke was the first). As a senior, Wooten earned American Football Coaches Association All-America honors and was selected to play in the Chicago College All-Star Game. He is believed to be one of the first African-Americans to earn All-America honors playing a position in the interior line. He graduated in 1959 with a Bachelor of Science degree in Education.

=== Honors ===
Wooten was inducted into the College Football Hall of Fame in 2012. He was also selected as one of 25 members of Colorado's All-Century Team in 1989, honoring the school’s first 100 years of intercollegiate football.

== Professional career ==
=== Cleveland Browns ===
Wooten was drafted in the fifth round (53rd overall) of the 1959 NFL draft by the Cleveland Browns, where he would play left guard for the next nine seasons. During that time, he blocked for Hall of Fame running back Jim Brown, widely regarded as one of the top running backs in NFL history. Brown led the league in rushing for six of the seven seasons Wooten served as one of his blockers, and was the NFL Most Valuable Player in 1965 with 1,544 yards and a league-best 21 touchdowns. The Browns defeated the Baltimore Colts, 27–0, to win the 1964 NFL Championship Game. They also played in the 1965 NFL Championship Game and lost to the Green Bay Packers, 23–12. In 1979, he was named to the Browns All-Time All-Star Team. In 2010, Wooten was inducted into the Browns Ring of Honor, as well as the Browns Legends program.

=== Washington Redskins ===
In July 1968, Wooten demanded a trade from the Browns after a dispute with the organization involving an all-white Browns' golf outing in Ashland, Ohio. On July 19, 1968, he was released from the Browns by owner Art Modell. The Washington Redskins signed Wooten in August, and he played his final year with them.

=== Front office ===
After retiring from football, Wooten worked for a short time as a sports agent at Pro Sports Advisors from 1973 to 1975. He then became a scout with the Dallas Cowboys from 1975 to 1979. He was promoted to Director of Pro Personnel in 1980. In 1992, he moved to the role of Player Personnel with the Philadelphia Eagles. He was promoted to Vice President of Player Personnel in 1994. In 1998, he moved to the Baltimore Ravens Assistant Director of Pro and College Scouting. In 2000, he began to prepare for his eventual retirement, taking a step back to work as a consultant with the Ravens until 2003.

Currently he is a Football GM & Scouting Instructor for the online sports-career training school Sports Management Worldwide.

== Fritz Pollard Alliance ==
In 2003, Wooten became the Chairman of the Fritz Pollard Alliance, an advocacy group who works in conjunction with the National Football League as it relates to minority hiring in coaching, scouting and front office positions.

== Personal life ==
Wooten is a resident of Arlington, Texas, where he lives with his wife. They have five children and five grandchildren.

== Awards and honors ==
NFL

- 1964 NFL Champion (as a player with the Cleveland Browns)
- Two-time Super Bowl Champion as a front office executive (XII with the Dallas Cowboys, XXXV with the Baltimore Ravens)
- 1968 First Team All-Pro
- Two-time Pro Bowl selection

Halls of Fame

- Cleveland Browns Legends (class of 2010)
- College Football Hall of Fame (class of 2012)

State/local

- Mural/statue commemorating the Cleveland Summit, of which Wooten was a participant.
