= Brock Strom =

American football player, Air Force officer, and engineer

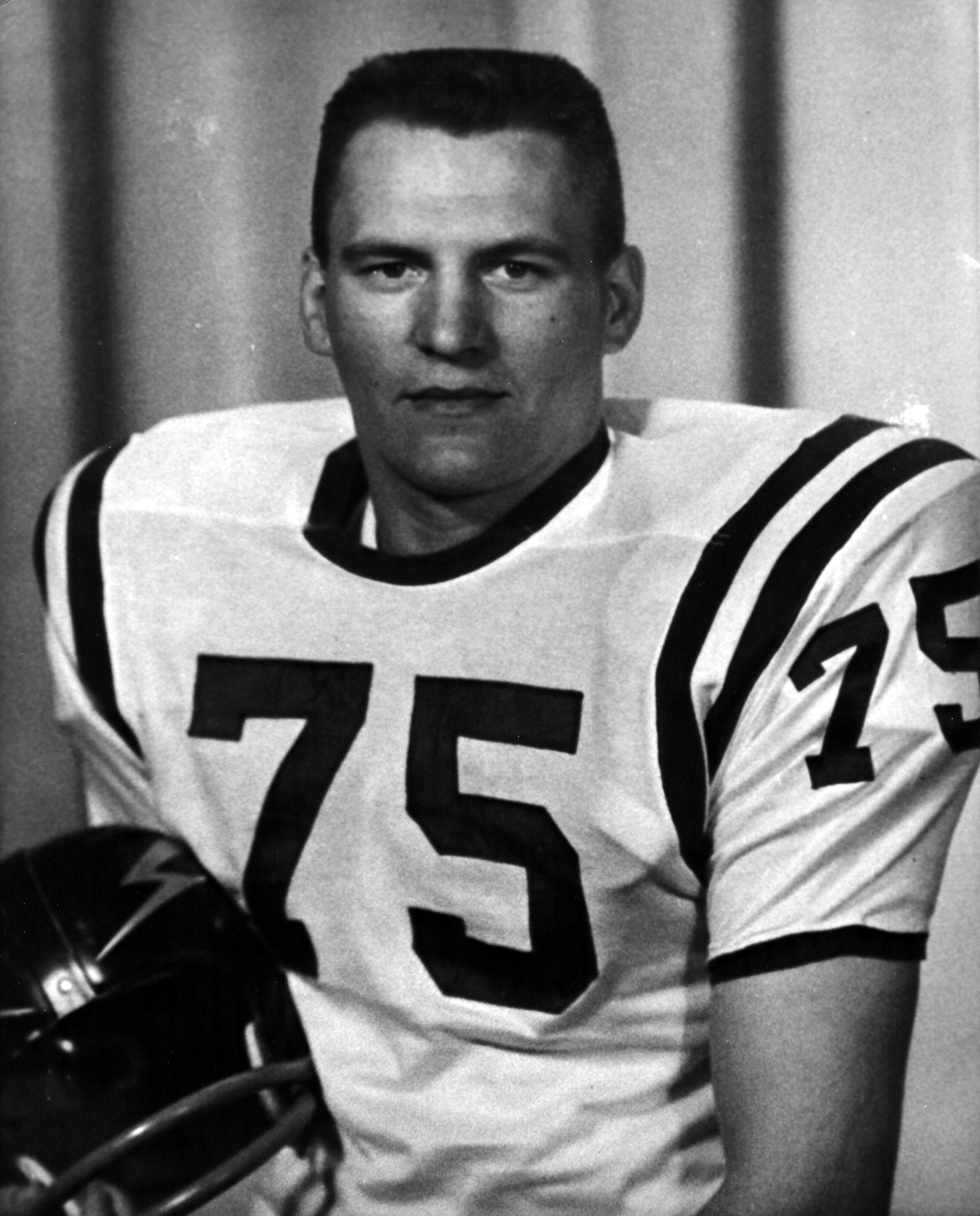

No. 75
- Position: Tackle

Personal information
- Born: September 21, 1934 (age 92); Munising, Michigan, U.S.

Career information
- College: Air Force

Awards and highlights
- Consensus All-American (1958)
- College Football Hall of Fame

Brock Strom (born September 21, 1934) is an American former football player, Rhodes scholar, Air Force officer, and engineer.

He was head of engineering for NAVSTAR GPS satellite program at the USAF Space & Missile Systems Organization (SAMSO), precursor to the Space Command and Space Force.

== Biography ==
Strom was born in Munising, Michigan.

Strom was a member of the first graduating class of the United States Air Force Academy (USAFA) in 1959. He was captain of the undefeated 1958 football team, and became the Academy's first All-American. He gained the honor when players played offense and defense and just 11 were selected. Strom played tackle on the offensive and defensive lines.

He earned an M.S. from MIT in 1961, and a Ph.D. from Arizona State University in 1971.

He flew 90 missions as a navigator in Vietnam, and was decorated with two Distinguished Flying Crosses, two Bronze Stars, and three Air Medals.

As a lieutenant colonel, he became Director of Engineering in the GPS Joint Program Office.

After retiring from the Air Force as a colonel, he joined Burlington Northern Railroad as the director of the Advanced Railroad Electronics System (ARES), which used GPS for positive train control. He became Vice President, Information Systems Services, at Burlington Northern Railroad in April 1988.

He later became a professor at the Air Force Academy in Colorado Springs, Colorado where he lived until he retired.
