= Rufus Granderson =

American football player (1936–2015)

No. 75, 72
- Position: Defensive tackle

Personal information
- Born: August 13, 1936; Waco, Texas, U.S.
- Died: October 20, 2015 (aged 79); Grand Rapids, Michigan, U.S.
- Listed height: 6 ft 5 in (1.96 m)
- Listed weight: 277 lb (126 kg)

Career information
- High school: Dunbar (Temple, Texas)
- College: Prairie View A&M (1956–1959)
- NFL draft: 1959: 19th round, 221st overall pick

Career history
- Detroit Lions (1960)*; Dallas Texans (1960); Grand Rapids Shamrocks/Blazers (1961–1962)
- * Offseason or practice squad member only

Awards and highlights
- Black college national champion (1958); All-UFL (1961)
- Stats at Pro Football Reference

Rufus Will Granderson (August 13, 1936 – October 20, 2015) was an American professional football defensive tackle who played one season with the Dallas Texans of the American Football League (AFL). He was selected by the Detroit Lions in the nineteenth round of the 1959 NFL draft after playing college football at Prairie View A&M University.

== Early life and college ==
Rufus Will Granderson was born on August 13, 1936, in Waco, Texas. He attended Dunbar High School in Temple, Texas.

Granderson was a member of the Prairie View A&M Panthers of Prairie View A&M College of Texas from 1956 to 1959 as a defensive tackle. The 1958 Panthers were black college national champions.

== Professional career ==
Granderson was selected by the Detroit Lions in the 19th round, with the 221st overall pick, of the 1959 NFL draft. He signed with the team on January 13, 1960. He was released on August 28, 1960.

Granderson then signed with the Dallas Texans of the American Football League and played in six games for the team during the 1960 season as a defensive tackle.

He was an offensive tackle for the Grand Rapids Shamrocks of the United Football League (UFL) in 1961 and earned All-UFL honors. He played in one game for the newly-renamed Grand Rapids Blazers in 1962.

== Personal life ==
Granderson later worked at Kendal Furniture, retiring in 2003. On February 21, 2015, the Temple Black Heritage Committee and the Temple Juneteenth Association named him the "Trailblazer of the Year" for being the first black pro football player from Temple, Texas. February 21, 2015 was then declared Rufus Granderson Day. He died on October 20, 2015, in Grand Rapids, Michigan.
