= Merv Johnson (American football) =

American football coach and executive (born 1936)

Biographical details
- Born: May 16, 1936 (age 90); King City, Missouri, U.S.

Playing career
- 1955–1957: Missouri
- Position: Tackle

Coaching career (HC unless noted)
- 1960–1961: Missouri (assistant)
- 1962–1974: Arkansas (assistant)
- 1975–1978: Notre Dame (OC)
- 1979–1997: Oklahoma (assistant)
- 1998–2012: Oklahoma (DFO)

Accomplishments and honors

Awards
- Second-team All-Big Eight (1957)

Merv Johnson (born May 16, 1936) is an American former football coach and executive.

Johnson was born in King City, Missouri in 1936. He attended the University of Missouri where he played football from 1955 to 1957, as a tackle. Johnson began his coaching career with the University of Arkansas as an assistant, then served as an assistant at Missouri from 1960 to 1961, Arkansas again from 1962 to 1974, Notre Dame from 1975 to 1978, and Oklahoma from 1979 to 1997. From 1998 to 2012, he was Oklahoma's director of football operations. He is a member of the Oklahoma Coaches Association Hall of Fame, and has received the All-American Football Foundation's Mike Campbell Lifetime Achievement Award and National Football Foundation Integrity Award.
