= John Adams (running back) =

American football player (1937–1995)

No. 39, 87
- Positions: End, fullback

Personal information
- Born: November 28, 1937; San Diego, California, U.S.
- Died: August 8, 1995 (aged 57); Helendale, California, U.S.
- Listed height: 6 ft 3 in (1.91 m)
- Listed weight: 235 lb (107 kg)

Career information
- High school: Hoover (San Diego)
- College: UCLA (1956); Los Angeles State (1958)
- NFL draft: 1959: 5th round, 57th overall pick

Career history
- Chicago Bears (1959–1962); Los Angeles Rams (1963)

Career NFL statistics
- Rushing yards: 99
- Rushing average: 2.4
- Receptions: 21
- Receiving yards: 264
- Total touchdowns: 4
- Stats at Pro Football Reference

John Albert Adams (November 28, 1937 – August 8, 1995) was a professional American football fullback in the National Football League (NFL). He played for five seasons for the Chicago Bears (1959–1962) and the Los Angeles Rams (1963). Adams was a fifth round selection (57th overall pick) of the Bears in the 1959 NFL draft out of California State University, Los Angeles.
