= 1958 All-Big Seven Conference football team =

The 1958 All-Big Seven Conference football team consists of American football players chosen by various organizations for All-Big Seven Conference teams for the 1958 college football season. The selectors for the 1958 season included the Associated Press (AP) and the United Press International (UPI). Players selected as first-team players by both the AP and UPI are designated in bold.

== All-Big Eight selections ==
=== Backs ===
- **Boyd Dowler**, Colorado (AP-1; UPI-1 [QB])
- **Homer Floyd**, Kansas (AP-1; UPI-1 [HB])
- **Dwight Nichols**, Iowa State (AP-1; UPI-1 [HB])
- **Prentice Gautt**, Oklahoma (AP-1; UPI-1 [FB])
- Dave Baker, Oklahoma (AP-2)
- Mel West, Missouri (AP-2)
- Eddie Dove, Colorado (AP-2; UPI-2)
- Dick McCashland, Nebraska (AP-2)
- Phil Snowden, Missouri (UPI-2)
- Hank Kuhlmann, Missouri (UPI-2)
- Howard Cook, Colorado (UPI-2)

=== Ends ===
- **Dan LaRose**, Missouri (AP-1; UPI-1)
- **Ross Coyle**, Oklahoma (AP-1; UPI-1)
- Joe Rector, Oklahoma (AP-2; UPI-2)
- Mel Semenko, Colorado (AP-2)
- Gale Gibson, Iowa State (UPI-2)

=== Tackles ===
- Jack Himelwright, Colorado (AP-1; UPI-2)
- Gilmer Lewis, Oklahoma (AP-1)
- John Peppercorn, Iowa State (AP-2; UPI-1)
- Steve Jennings, Oklahoma (UPI-1)
- Mike Magac, Missouri (AP-2; UPI-2)

=== Guards ===
- **Charles Rash**, Missouri (AP-1; UPI-1)
- Dick Corbitt, Oklahoma (AP-1)
- Don Chadwick, Missouri (AP-2; UPI-1)
- Dave Noblitt, Kansas St. (AP-2; UPI-2)
- John Wooten, Colorado (UPI-2)

=== Centers ===
- **Bob Harrison**, Oklahoma (AP-1; UPI-1)
- Donald Fricke, Nebraska (AP-2; UPI-2)

== Key ==
AP = Associated Press

UPI = United Press International

== See also ==
- 1958 College Football All-America Team
