= Bob Harrison (American football player) =

American football player (1937–2016)

- Harrison in 1961

No. 54, 42, 30
- Position: Linebacker

Personal information
- Born: August 8, 1937; Stamford, Texas, U.S.
- Died: February 4, 2016 (aged 78); Stamford, Texas, U.S.
- Listed height: 6 ft 2 in (1.88 m)
- Listed weight: 225 lb (102 kg)

Career information
- High school: Stamford
- College: Oklahoma
- NFL draft: 1959: 2nd round, 17th overall pick

Career history
- San Francisco 49ers (1959–1961); Philadelphia Eagles (1962–1963); Pittsburgh Steelers (1964); San Francisco 49ers (1965–1967)

Awards and highlights
- National champion (1956); UPI Lineman of the Year (1958); Consensus All-American (1958); Second-team All-American (1957); 2× First-team All-Big Eight (1957, 1958)

Career NFL statistics
- Interceptions: 5
- Fumble recoveries: 6
- Sacks: 3
- Stats at Pro Football Reference

Robert Lucius Harrison Jr. (August 8, 1937 – February 4, 2016) was an American professional football linebacker in the National Football League (NFL) for the San Francisco 49ers, Philadelphia Eagles, and Pittsburgh Steelers. He played college football at the University of Oklahoma and was selected in the second round of the 1959 NFL draft. Harrison died in 2016, aged 78.
