= Ross Coyle =

American football player (born 1937)

No. 72, 70, 43
- Positions: Defensive back, end

Personal information
- Born: March 23, 1937 (age 89); Marlow, Oklahoma, U.S.
- Listed height: 6 ft 3 in (1.91 m)
- Listed weight: 195 lb (88 kg)

Career information
- High school: Marlow
- College: Oklahoma (1955–1958)
- NFL draft: 1959: 20th round, 237th overall pick

Career history
- Toronto Argonauts (1959); Calgary Stampeders (1960); Los Angeles Rams (1961)

Awards and highlights
- National champion (1956); First-team All-Big Eight (1958); Second-team All-Big Eight (1957)
- Stats at Pro Football Reference

Charles Ross Coyle (born March 23, 1937) is an American former professional football player who played for the Los Angeles Rams of the National Football League (NFL), and the Toronto Argonauts and Calgary Stampeders of the Canadian Football League (CFL). He played college football for the Oklahoma Sooners.

== Early life and college ==
Charles Ross Coyle was born on March 23, 1937, in Marlow, Oklahoma. He attended Marlow High School in Marlow.

Coyle was a member of the Oklahoma Sooners of the University of Oklahoma from 1955 to 1958 and a three-year letterman at end from 1956 to 1958. He caught one pass for six yards in 1956 as Oklahoma were named consensus national champions. He recorded four catches for 114 yards in 1957 and earned Associated Press (AP) second-team All-Big Seven honors. As a senior in 1958, Coyle caught six passes for 161 yards and one touchdown, garnering AP and United Press first-team All-Big Seven recognition.

== Professional career ==
Coyle was selected by the Los Angeles Rams in the 20th round, with the 237th overall pick, of the 1959 NFL draft. However, he instead signed with the Toronto Argonauts of the Canadian Football League on January 28, 1959. He played in 13 games for the Argonauts during the 1959 season as an end and defensive back, recording 12 receptions for 176 yards and four touchdowns while also intercepting five passes.

On September 2, 1960, Coyle and Al Schlosser were traded to the Calgary Stampeders for Lynn Bottoms. Coyle appeared in ten games for the Stampeders that year as an offensive end and linebacker, totaling seven catches for 89 yards and also two interceptions.

Coyle signed with the Los Angeles Rams on September 12, 1961. He played in 13 games during the 1961 season as a safety. He became a free agent after the season.
