= Hank Kuhlmann =

American football player and coach, baseball player

Biographical details
- Born: October 6, 1937 (age 89); Webster Groves, Missouri, U.S.

Playing career
- 1956–1958: Missouri
- Position: Fullback

Coaching career (HC unless noted)
- 1962: Missouri (GA)
- 1963–1965: Missouri (freshman RB)
- 1966–1970: Missouri (RB)
- 1971–1974: Green Bay Packers (ST)
- 1975–1978: Notre Dame (RB)
- 1978–1982: Chicago Bears (ST/RB)
- 1983–1985: Birmingham Stallions (AHC/OC)
- 1986–1989: St. Louis / Phoenix Cardinals (RB)
- 1989: Phoenix Cardinals (interim HC)
- 1991: Tampa Bay Buccaneers (OC/RB)
- 1994: Indianapolis Colts (TE)
- 1995–1997: Indianapolis Colts (ST)
- 1998–1999: Arizona Cardinals (TE)
- 2000–2003: Arizona Cardinals (ST)

Administrative career (AD unless noted)
- 1990: Phoenix Cardinals (scout)

Head coaching record
- Overall: 0–5

Accomplishments and honors

Awards
- First-team All-Big Eight (1957); Second-team All-Big Eight (1958)

Henry N. Kuhlmann (born October 6, 1937) is an American former football coach, and was the interim head coach for the National Football League (NFL)'s Phoenix Cardinals for part of the 1989 season. He assumed the position after Gene Stallings announced his retirement in November. Stallings had intended to finish the season, but general manager Larry Wilson ordered him to leave immediately, believing Stallings would be too much of a distraction. Kuhlmann finished with an 0–5 record, and was replaced by Joe Bugel before the start of the following season.

Kuhlmann played fullback for the Missouri Tigers football team from 1956 to 1958 under coaches Don Faurot, Frank Broyles, and Dan Devine. He led the Tigers in rushing and in scoring the 1956 and 1957 seasons and also led the team in interceptions in 1956. Kuhlmann received All-Big Eight Conference honors in 1957.

Kuhlmann also played catcher for the Missouri Tigers baseball team. In 1958, he was named to the All College World Series team, helping the Tigers to a national runner-up finish.

Upon graduation from Missouri, Kuhlmann signed with the St. Louis Cardinals, spending four years in the minor leagues. He then returned to Missouri, where he served as an assistant coach under Devine before accompanying Devine to the Green Bay Packers and Notre Dame Fighting Irish.

In 2010, Kuhlmann was inducted into the University of Missouri Intercollegiate Athletics Hall of Fame.

== Head coaching record ==
Team	Year	Regular Season					Postseason			
Team	Year	Won	Lost	Ties	Win %	Finish	Won	Lost	Win %	Result
PHX	1989	0	5	0	.000	4th in NFC East	–	–	–	–
PHX total		0	5	0	.000		–	–	–	
Total		0	5	0	.000					
