= Burr Davis =

Canadian football player (1937–2020)

Profile
- Position: Centre

Personal information
- Born: January 4, 1937; Jacksonville, Texas, U.S.
- Died: March 28, 2020 (aged 83); Houston, Texas, U.S.
- Listed height: 6 ft 0 in (1.83 m)
- Listed weight: 220 lb (100 kg)

Career information
- High school: Jacksonville (TX)
- College: Houston
- NFL draft: 1959: 9th round, 103rd overall pick

Career history
- 1959–1960: Winnipeg Blue Bombers

Awards and highlights
- Grey Cup champion (1959)

Harold "Burr" Davis (January 4, 1937 – March 28, 2020) was an American professional football player who played for the Winnipeg Blue Bombers. He won the Grey Cup with them in 1959. Delveaux played college football at the University of Houston where he won letters for his performance. After his football career he coached at Klein High School and St. Thomas High School in Houston.
