= Bob Denton =

American football player (1934–2014)

No. 54, 62
- Positions: Defensive end, offensive tackle

Personal information
- Born: July 24, 1934; Fresno, California, U.S.
- Died: July 8, 2014 (aged 79); Stockton, California, U.S.
- Listed height: 6 ft 3 in (1.91 m)
- Listed weight: 244 lb (111 kg)

Career information
- High school: Stockton
- College: Pacific
- NFL draft: 1959: 6th round, 71st overall pick

Career history
- Cleveland Browns (1960); Minnesota Vikings (1961–1964)

Awards and highlights
- Sun Bowl champion (1953)

Career NFL statistics
- Games played: 68
- Games started: 3
- Fumble recoveries: 1
- Sacks: 5.5
- Stats at Pro Football Reference

Robert George Denton (July 24, 1934 – July 8, 2014) was an American professional football player who was a defensive end and tackle in the National Football League (NFL). He played for five seasons for two different teams: the Cleveland Browns and Minnesota Vikings. He played college football for the Pacific Tigers.
