= Eddie Dove =

American football player (born 1937)

- Dove in 1961

No. 44, 48
- Positions: Safety, return specialist

Personal information
- Born: April 4, 1937 (age 89); Hygiene, Colorado, U.S.
- Listed height: 6 ft 2 in (1.88 m)
- Listed weight: 181 lb (82 kg)

Career information
- High school: Loveland (Loveland, Colorado)
- College: Colorado
- NFL draft: 1959: 3rd round, 29th overall pick

Career history
- San Francisco 49ers (1959–1963); New York Giants (1963)

Awards and highlights
- Pro Bowl (1961); 2× Second-team All-Big Eight (1957, 1958)

Career NFL statistics
- Interceptions: 10
- Fumble recoveries: 7
- Return yards: 493
- Stats at Pro Football Reference

Edward Everest Dove (born April 4, 1937) is an American former professional football player who was a safety in the National Football League (NFL) for the San Francisco 49ers and New York Giants. He played college football for the Colorado Buffaloes and was selected in the third round of the 1959 NFL draft.

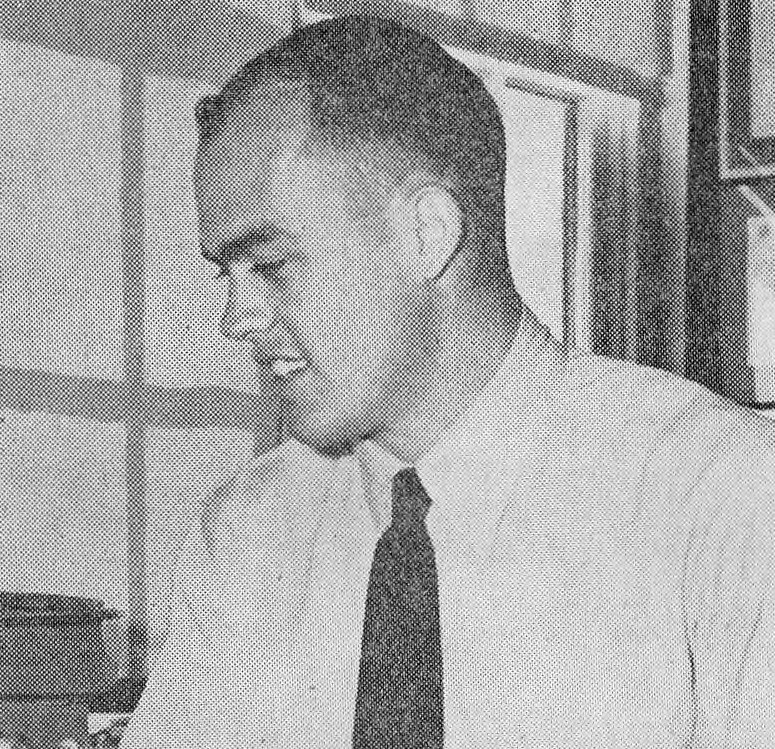

Dove served in the United States Army's XV Corps as a typist. Dove served two weeks out of every year for the XV Corps starting in 1959.
