= Art Gob =

American football player (1937–2017)

No. 89
- Position: Defensive end

Personal information
- Born: November 7, 1937; Pittsburgh, Pennsylvania, U.S.
- Died: May 8, 2017 (aged 79); Pittsburgh, Pennsylvania, U.S.
- Listed height: 6 ft 4 in (1.93 m)
- Listed weight: 230 lb (104 kg)

Career information
- High school: Baldwin (Pittsburgh)
- College: Pittsburgh
- NFL draft: 1959: 22nd round, 257th overall pick

Career history
- Washington Redskins (1959–1960); Los Angeles Chargers (1960)

Career NFL/AFL statistics
- Safeties: 1
- Stats at Pro Football Reference

Arthur Jerome Gob (November 7, 1937 – May 8, 2017) was an American professional football defensive end. He played in the National Football League (NFL) for the Washington Redskins and in the American Football League (AFL) for the Los Angeles Chargers. He played college football at the University of Pittsburgh and was selected in the 22nd round of the 1959 NFL draft. He died on May 8, 2017, at the age of 79.
