= Mel Semenko =

American gridiron football player (1937–2023)

Profile
- Position: Defensive end

Personal information
- Born: November 26, 1937; Baton Rouge, Louisiana, U.S.
- Died: March 24, 2023 (aged 85); Wexford, Pennsylvania, U.S.
- Listed height: 6 ft 2 in (1.88 m)
- Listed weight: 235 lb (107 kg)

Career information
- College: Colorado
- NFL draft: 1959: 27th round, 318th overall pick
- AFL draft: 1960

Career history
- 1961: BC Lions
- 1962–1963: Ottawa Rough Riders
- 1963: Montreal Alouettes

Awards and highlights
- CFL East All-Star (1962); Second-team All-Big Eight (1958)

Melvin Roy Semenko (December 12, 1937 – March 24, 2023) was an American professional football player who played for the BC Lions, Ottawa Rough Riders and Montreal Alouettes. He played college football at the University of Colorado. He was drafted in the 27th round by the San Francisco 49ers in the 1959 NFL Draft.

Semenko died in Wexford, Pennsylvania on March 24, 2023, at the age of 85.
