= Don Stiller =

American football player

Profile
- Positions: Guard, End

Personal information
- Born: c. 1936; Shawnee, Oklahoma, U.S.
- Died: May 19, 2024 (aged 87)
- Listed height: 6 ft 4 in (1.93 m)
- Listed weight: 205 lb (93 kg)

Career information
- College: Oklahoma

Career history
- 1958–1959: Edmonton Eskimos

Awards and highlights
- 2× National champion (1955, 1956); 2× Second-team All-Big Eight (1956, 1957)

Don Stiller (b. 1936? - d. May 19, 2024) is an American former football player who was part of the Edmonton Eskimos of the Canadian Football League (CFL).

Stiller was born in 1936 in Shawnee, Oklahoma, to Arthur W., a local grocer, and Esther L. Stiller, and younger brother of Robert Arthur "Bob." The two were star athletes at Shawnee High School. Bob, graduating in 1945, continued his education and lettered in track at nearby Oklahoma Baptist University, before entering the Marines and serving in the Pacific. Don was named All-State in football at SHS graduating in 1954. He went on to the University of Oklahoma, where he played football for Bud Wilkinson and was named All-Big Seven. He was a Sooner from 1954 to 1957, never losing a game during the 47 games winning streak which still stands today. In his last season the string was snapped by Notre Dame. He played end on OUs 1956 National Championship squad. Stiller's senior year he was named co-captain by his teammates. He also lettered on the baseball team. Stiller was selected by the Edmonton Eskimos of the Canadian League but was eventually cut due to the limit of American players the teams were allowed by the league.

He returned to Shawnee and enlisted in the Army Reserves after having been involved in ROTC during his undergrad years. He was posted to the artillery unit in Norman, Oklahoma, and was able to work on his master's degree in business. Stiller married Barbara Birkhead, also from Shawnee. The family moved to Savannah, Georgia, where Stiller entered the insurance business and was eventually the manager of the claims administration of Medicare in Georgia.
