= Jim Wood (American football) =

American gridiron football player and coach (born 1936)

Biographical details
- Born: July 27, 1936 (age 90); Tonkawa, Oklahoma, U.S.

Playing career
- 1956–1958: Oklahoma State
- 1959: Calgary Stampeders
- 1959: BC Lions
- Position: End

Coaching career (HC unless noted)
- 1962–1963: Hancock (assistant)
- 1964–1967: New Mexico State (assistant)
- 1968–1972: New Mexico State
- 1973: Calgary Stampeders (assistant)
- 1973–1975: Calgary Stampeders

Head coaching record
- Overall: 21–30–1 (college); 10–19 (CFL)

Accomplishments and honors

Awards
- First-team All-American (1958)

Jim Wood (born July 27, 1936) is an American former gridiron football player and coach. He played college football at the end position at Oklahoma State University from 1956 to 1958. He was selected by the American Football Coaches Association as a first-team end on its 1958 College Football All-America Team, and as a third-team player by the Associated Press. At the end of the 1958 season, an experiment was conducted in which data from 145 football coaches was input into a Univac computer to determine who was the best college football player in the country. The computer ranked Wood as the nation's second best player behind George Deiderich of Vanderbilt. Wood capped his collegiate career by leading Oklahoma State to a 15–6 victory over Florida State in the 1958 Bluegrass Bowl.

Wood later coached at the collegiate and professional levels, including a five-year stint as the head coach at New Mexico State University in Las Cruces, New Mexico from 1968 to 1972. He was the head coach for the Calgary Stampeders of the Canadian Football League (CFL) from 1973 to 1975.

== Head coaching record ==
=== College ===
Year	Team	Overall	Conference	Standing	Bowl/playoffs
New Mexico State Aggies (NCAA University Division independent) (1968–1970)
1968	New Mexico State	5–5			
1969	New Mexico State	5–5			
1970	New Mexico State	4–6			
New Mexico State Aggies (Missouri Valley Conference) (1971–1972)
1971	New Mexico State	5–5–1	0–0	NA	
1972	New Mexico State	2–9	1–4	7th	
New Mexico State:		21–30–1	1–4		
Total:		21–30–1			
