= Ted Bates (American football) =

American football player (1936–2021)

No. 51, 81, 56
- Position: Linebacker

Personal information
- Born: September 22, 1936; Baytown, Texas, U.S.
- Died: April 17, 2021 (aged 84); West Covina, California, U.S.
- Listed height: 6 ft 3 in (1.91 m)
- Listed weight: 219 lb (99 kg)

Career information
- High school: Manual Arts (Los Angeles, California)
- College: Oregon State
- NFL draft: 1959: 5th round, 52nd overall pick

Career history
- Chicago/St. Louis Cardinals (1959–1962); New York Jets (1963)

Awards and highlights
- Consensus All-American (1958); First-team All-PCC (1958); Second-team All-PCC (1957)

Career NFL/AFL statistics
- Fumble recoveries: 2
- Sacks: 6
- Stats at Pro Football Reference

Ted Douglas Bates (September 22, 1936 – April 17, 2021) was an American football linebacker. He played in the National Football League (NFL) from 1959 to 1963. He played college football at Oregon State University and was drafted in the fifth round of the 1959 NFL draft by the Chicago Cardinals. He played for the Cardinals for four seasons and played for the New York Jets his final season.

Bates died in West Covina, California on April 17, 2021, at the age of 84.

== See also ==
- List of American Football League players
