= Fred Pickard =

American football player and coach (1938–2021)

Biographical details
- Born: 1938
- Died: December 31, 2021 (aged 83); Dickson, Tennessee, U.S.

Playing career
- 1956–1959: Florida State
- 1963–1964: Jacksonville Robins
- 1964: Daytona Beach Thunderbirds
- 1965: Orlando Thunderbirds
- 1966: Jacksonville Jaguars (NAFL)
- Position: Fullback

Coaching career (HC unless noted)
- ?–1974: Terry Parker HS (FL)
- 1975–1981: Tennessee–Martin (LB)
- 1982–1985: Tennessee–Martin

Head coaching record
- Overall: 12–31–1 (college)

Accomplishments and honors

Awards
- Third-team All-American (1958)

Fred Pickard (1938 – December 31, 2021) was an American football player and coach. An honorable mention fullback at Florida State University in his college days, Pickard served as the head football coach at the University of Tennessee–Martin from 1982 to 1985, compiling a record of 12–31–1. Pickard died in Dickson, Tennessee on December 31, 2021, at the age of 83.

== Head coaching record ==
=== College ===
Year	Team	Overall	Conference	Standing	Bowl/playoffs
Tennessee–Martin Pacers (Gulf South Conference) (1982–1985)
1982	Tennessee–Martin	5–6	0–6	8th	
1983	Tennessee–Martin	4–7	3–4	6th	
1984	Tennessee–Martin	2–8–1	1–6–1	8th	
1985	Tennessee–Martin	1–10	0–8	9th	
Tennessee–Martin:		12–31–1	4–24–1		
Total:		12–31–1			
