= Jack Laraway =

American football player and coach (1935–2017)

No. 57, 34
- Position: Linebacker

Personal information
- Born: September 20, 1935; Erie, Pennsylvania, U.S.
- Died: December 3, 2017 (aged 82); Naples, Florida, U.S.
- Listed height: 6 ft 1 in (1.85 m)
- Listed weight: 220 lb (100 kg)

Career information
- High school: Erie Academy
- College: Purdue
- NFL draft: 1959: 10th round, 112th overall pick

Career history

Playing
- Buffalo Bills (1960); Houston Oilers (1961)

Coaching
- Rocky River (OH) HS (1983–1985) Defensive coordinator

Awards and highlights
- AFL champion (1961)

Career AFL statistics
- Interceptions: 1
- Stats at Pro Football Reference

Jack Duane Laraway (September 20, 1935 – December 3, 2017) was an American professional football linebacker who played in the American Football League (AFL). He is a member of the Pennsylvania Sports Hall of Fame, class of 1997.

== Professional career ==
Laraway played college football at Purdue University and was drafted into the National Football League (NFL) (by the Detroit Lions in the 1959 NFL draft in the tenth round and as the 112th pick overall. Injured in a 1960 preseason game with the Detroit Lions, he played the 1960 season for the Buffalo Bills of the American Football League, starting 10 games at Left Outside Linebacker. He signed with the Houston Oilers in 1961 helping them to the AFL Championship game in which Houston defeated the San Diego Chargers 10-3. 1962 Linebacker Houston Oilers. In 1963, Laraway scored the first points in New York Jets team history with a sack of Buffalo Bills QB Jack Kemp for a 2-point safety.

Laraway wore jersey number 57 with the Buffalo Bills and number 34 with the Houston Oilers. In 1961, with the Houston Oilers, he had 1 interception, returned 30 yards and one kickoff return for 22 yards.

== Post-football career ==
Laraway was the physical education instructor and head football coach for the Lee Burneson Junior High School during the 1975 school year in Westlake, Ohio. His son, Ron also played for the team. Jack Laraway was the defensive coordinator for Rocky River High School football team from 1983 to 1985.
