= 1957 All-Big Seven Conference football team =

The 1957 All-Big Seven Conference football team consists of American football players chosen by various organizations for All-Big Seven Conference teams for the 1957 college football season. The selectors for the 1957 season included the Associated Press (AP) and the United Press (UP). Players selected as first-team players by both the AP and UP are designated in bold.

== All-Big Eight selections ==
=== Backs ===
- Dwight Nichols, Iowa State (AP-1)
- Bob Stransky, Colorado (AP-1)
- Clendon Thomas, Oklahoma (AP-1) (College Football Hall of Fame)
- Hank Kuhlmann, Missouri (AP-1)
- Homer Floyd, Kansas (AP-2)
- Eddie Dove, Colorado (AP-2)
- Ralph Pfeifer, Kansas State (AP-2)
- Boyd Dowler, Colorado (AP-2)

=== Ends ===
- Don Zadnik, Kansas State (AP-1)
- Jim Letcavits, Kansas (AP-1)
- Ross Coyle, Oklahoma (AP-2)
- Don Stiller, Oklahoma (AP-2)

=== Tackles ===
- Jack Keelan, Kansas State (AP-1)
- John Wooten, Colorado (AP-1)
- Byron Searcy, Oklahoma (AP-2)
- Merv Johnson, Missouri (AP-2)

=== Guards ===
- Bill Krisher, Oklahoma (AP-1)
- Charles Rash, Missouri (AP-1)
- Kenneth Northcutt, Oklahoma (AP-2)
- Dave Munger, Iowa State (AP-2)

=== Centers ===
- Bob Harrison, Oklahoma (AP-1)
- Dick McCashland, Nebraska (AP-2)

== Key ==
AP = Associated Press

UP = United Press

== See also ==
- 1957 College Football All-America Team
