= Larry Baker =

American football player (born 1937)

No. 73
- Position: Offensive tackle

Personal information
- Born: March 9, 1937; Shelby, Ohio, U.S.
- Died: December 23, 2000 (aged 63); Miami, Florida, U.S.
- Listed height: 6 ft 2 in (1.88 m)
- Listed weight: 240 lb (109 kg)

Career information
- High school: Shelby
- College: Bowling Green
- NFL draft: 1959: 27th round, 322nd overall pick

Career history
- New York Titans (1960)

Career AFL statistics
- Games played: 2
- Games started: 1
- Stats at Pro Football Reference

Larry Joe Baker (March 9, 1937 – December 23, 2000) was an American college and professional football player. An offensive tackle, he played college football at Bowling Green State, and played professionally in the American Football League (AFL) for the New York Titans in 1960. He was married and had three children.

== See also ==
- List of American Football League players
