= Willie Taylor (Canadian football) =

American gridiron football player (1936–2022)

Profile
- Positions: Tackle, Guard

Personal information
- Born: December 17, 1936; Tallahassee, Florida, U.S.
- Died: February 25, 2022 (aged 85)
- Listed height: 6 ft 0 in (1.83 m)
- Listed weight: 230 lb (104 kg)

Career information
- College: Florida A&M
- NFL draft: 1959: 6th round, 61st overall pick

Career history
- 1961: Hamilton Tiger-Cats
- 1962–1965: BC Lions

Awards and highlights
- Grey Cup champion (1964)

Willie Taylor (December 17, 1936 – February 25, 2022) was an American professional football player who played for the Hamilton Tiger-Cats and BC Lions. He won the Grey Cup with the Lions in 1964. He played college football at Florida A&M University and was drafted by the Green Bay Packers in the 1959 NFL draft (Round 6, #61).

Taylor died on February 25, 2022, at the age of 85.
