= Ralph Pfeifer =

Canadian football player (born 1936)

Profile
- Position: Halfback

Personal information
- Born: August 21, 1936 (age 90)
- Listed height: 6 ft 0 in (1.83 m)
- Listed weight: 210 lb (95 kg)

Career information
- College: Kansas State

Career history
- 1958: Edmonton Eskimos

Awards and highlights
- Second-team All-Big Eight (1957)

Ralph Pfeifer (born August 21, 1936) is a former Canadian football player who played for the Edmonton Eskimos. He played college football at Kansas State University.
