= John Guzik (linebacker) =

American football player (1936–2012)

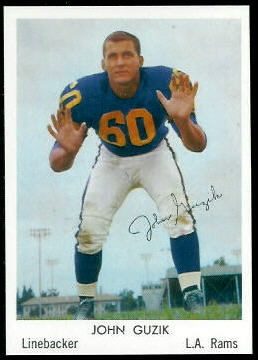
- Guzik with the Los Angeles Rams in 1959

No. 65, 33
- Positions: Linebacker, offensive guard

Personal information
- Born: July 12, 1936; Lawrence, Pennsylvania, U.S.
- Died: January 22, 2012 (aged 75); Salinas, California, U.S.
- Listed height: 6 ft 3 in (1.91 m)
- Listed weight: 231 lb (105 kg)

Career information
- High school: Cecil Township (Venice, Pennsylvania)
- College: Pittsburgh (1954–1958)
- NFL draft: 1958: 4th round, 41st overall pick

Career history
- Los Angeles Rams (1959–1960); New York Giants (1961)*; Baltimore Colts (1961)*; Houston Oilers (1961)
- * Offseason or practice squad member only

Awards and highlights
- AFL champion (1961); Consensus All-American (1958); First-team All-Eastern (1958); Second-team All-Eastern (1957)
- Stats at Pro Football Reference

John Paul Guzik III (July 12, 1936 – January 22, 2012) was an American professional football player who played three seasons in the National Football League (NFL) and American Football League (AFL) with the Los Angeles Rams and Houston Oilers. He was selected by the Rams in the fourth round of the 1958 NFL draft after playing college football at the University of Pittsburgh, where he was a consensus All-American in 1958. He was a member of the Oilers team that won the 1961 AFL championship.

== Early life and college ==
John Paul Guzik III was born July 12, 1936, in Lawrence, Pennsylvania. He attended Cecil Township High School in Venice, Pennsylvania. In 2016, he was inducted into the Washington-Greene Chapter of the Pennsylvania Sports Hall of Fame.

Guzik was a member of the Pittsburgh Panthers freshmen team in 1954 and a member of the main roster from 1955 to 1958 as an offensive guard and linebacker. He was named Associated Press (AP) second-team All-Eastern in 1957, United Press International and AP first-team All-Eastern in 1958, and a consensus All-American in 1958.

== Professional career ==
Guzik was selected by the Los Angeles Rams in the fourth round, with the 41st overall pick, of the 1958 NFL draft. He officially signed with the team a year later on March 25, 1959, receiving the largest contract in NFL history for a college lineman up to that point in time ($8,500 per year with a $2,000 signing bonus). He reportedly used his signing bonus to buy a Chevy Impala. He played in 12 games, starting two, for the Rams during the 1959 season. Guzik appeared in 12 games, no starts, in 1960.

On January 28, 1961, his negotiation rights were traded to the New York Giants. He later signed with the Giants on July 5, 1961.

On August 3, 1961, Guzik was traded to the Baltimore Colts for Jerry Richardson. He was later released by the Colts and signed by the Houston Oilers of the American Football League (AFL), for whom he played in three games during the 1961 AFL season. On December 24, 1961, the Oilers defeated the San Diego Chargers in the 1961 American Football League Championship Game by a score of 10–3.

== Later life ==
Guzik died on January 22, 2012, in Salinas, California.
