= George McGee =

American football player (born 1935)

No. 75, 65
- Position: Offensive tackle

Personal information
- Born: October 7, 1935 (age 91); Baton Rouge, Louisiana, U.S.
- Listed height: 6 ft 2 in (1.88 m)
- Listed weight: 255 lb (116 kg)

Career information
- High school: Southern University Laboratory School (Baton Rouge)
- College: Southern
- NFL draft: 1959: 16th round, 184th overall pick

Career history
- Boston Patriots (1960); Boston Sweepers (1963)

Career AFL statistics
- Games played: 14
- Games started: 14
- Stats at Pro Football Reference

George McGee (born October 7, 1935) is an American former professional football player who was a tackle with the Boston Patriots of the American Football League (AFL). He played college football for the Southern Jaguars.
