= NFL All-Time Team =

The following NFL All-Time Anniversary Teams have been selected during the National Football League's history:

- NFL 50th Anniversary All-Time Team, selected in 1969
- NFL 75th Anniversary All-Time Team, selected in 1994
- NFL 100th Anniversary All-Time Team, selected in 2019
