= Ben Donnell (American football) =

American football player (1936–2012)

No. 50
- Position: Defensive end

Personal information
- Born: July 17, 1936; Old Hickory, Tennessee, U.S.
- Died: July 31, 2012 (aged 76); Tennessee, U.S.
- Listed height: 6 ft 5 in (1.96 m)
- Listed weight: 248 lb (112 kg)

Career information
- High school: DuPont (TN)
- College: Vanderbilt
- NFL draft: 1959: 7th round, 77th overall pick

Career history
- Detroit Lions (1959)*; Los Angeles Chargers (1960)
- * Offseason or practice squad member only
- Stats at Pro Football Reference

Ben Clay Donnell (July 17, 1936 – July 31, 2012) was an American football defensive end who played one season for the Los Angeles Chargers. He was drafted in the seventh round (77th round) by the Detroit Lions but did not play for them.
