= 1958 All-America college football team =

Official list of the best college football players of 1958

The 1958 All-America college football team is composed of college football players who were selected as All-Americans by various organizations and writers that chose All-America college football teams in 1958. The six selectors recognized by the NCAA as "official" for the 1958 season are (1) the American Football Coaches Association (AFCA), (2) the Associated Press (AP), (3) the Football Writers Association of America (FWAA), (4) the Newspaper Enterprise Association (NEA), (5) the Sporting News, and (6) the United Press International (UPI).

Three players were unanimously chosen as first-team All-Americans by all six official selectors. They were: (1) quarterback Randy Duncan who won the 1958 Walter Camp Player of the Year Award and led the 1958 Iowa Hawkeyes to the 1958 FWAA national championship; (2) halfback Billy Cannon who led the 1958 LSU Tigers to the 1958 AP national championship and won the Heisman Trophy in 1959; and (3) Army halfback Pete Dawkins who won the 1958 Heisman Trophy and later became a Rhodes scholar, a brigadier general, co-chairman of Bain & Company, and CEO of Primerica. All three have been inducted into the College Football Hall of Fame.

== Consensus All-Americans ==
For the year 1958, the NCAA recognizes six published All-American teams as "official" designations for purposes of its consensus determinations. The following chart identifies the NCAA-recognized consensus All-Americans and displays which first-team designations they received.

Name	Position	School	Number	Official	Other
Billy Cannon	Halfback	LSU	6/6	AFCA, AP, FWAA, NEA, SN, UPI	CP, Time, WC
Randy Duncan	Quarterback	Iowa	6/6	AFCA, AP, FWAA, NEA, SN, UPI	CP, WC
Pete Dawkins	Halfback	Army	6/6	AFCA, AP, FWAA, NEA, SN, UPI	CP, WC
Buddy Dial	End	Rice	5/6	AP, FWAA, NEA, SN, UPI	Time, WC
Ted Bates	Tackle	Oregon State	5/6	AFCA, AP, NEA, SN, UPI	CP, WC
Bob Harrison	Center	Oklahoma	5/6	AP, FWAA, NEA, SN, UPI	CP, WC
Bob White	Fullback	Ohio State	4/6	FWAA, NEA, SN, UPI	CP, Time, WC
John Guzik	Guard	Pittsburgh	4/6	FWAA, NEA, SN, UPI	Time, WC
Zeke Smith	Guard	Auburn	3/6	AP, FWAA, NEA	CP, Time, WC
George Deiderich	Guard	Vanderbilt	3/6	AP, AFCA, FWAA	--
Sam Williams	End	Michigan State	2/6	AFCA, UPI	Time, WC
Brock Strom	Tackle	Air Force	2/6	AP, UPI	WC

== All-American selections for 1958 ==
=== Ends ===
- Buddy Dial, Rice (AP-1, FWAA, NEA-1, SN, UPI-1, Time, WC)
- Sam Williams, Michigan State (AFCA, UPI-1, Time, WC)
- Jim Houston, Ohio State (AP-1, FWAA, NEA-2, UPI-3, CP)
- Al Goldstein, North Carolina (FWAA, NEA-1)
- Jim Wood, Oklahoma State (AFCA, AP-3)
- Curt Merz, Iowa (FWAA, NEA-2)
- Tom Franckhauser, Purdue (CP)
- Monty Stickles, Notre Dame (AP-2, SN, NEA-3, UPI-2)
- Carroll Dale, Virginia Tech (AP-2)
- Rich Kreitling, Illinois (AP-3, UPI-2)
- Jerry Wilson, Auburn (UPI-3)
- Chris Burford, Stanford (NEA-3)

=== Tackles ===
- Ted Bates, Oregon State (AFCA, AP-1, NEA-1, SN, UPI-1, CP, WC)
- Brock Strom, Air Force (AP-1, NEA-3, UPI-1, WC)
- Jim Marshall, Ohio State (SN, UPI-3, Time)
- Ron Luciano, Syracuse (AP-2, NEA-1, UPI-2, CP)
- Bill Leeka, UCLA (Time)
- Andy Cvercko, Northwestern (FWAA)
- Don Floyd, TCU (AP-2, FWAA, NEA-2, UPI-3)
- Vel Heckman, Florida (AP-3, FWAA, NEA-3, UPI-2)
- Gene Selawski, Purdue (AP-3, FWAA, NEA-2)
- Hogan Wharton, Houston (AFCA)

=== Guards ===
- John Guzik, Pittsburgh (AP-2, FWAA, NEA-1, SN, UPI-1, Time, WC)
- Zeke Smith, Auburn (AP-1, FWAA, NEA-1, UPI-2, CP, Time, WC)
- George Deiderich, Vanderbilt (AP-1, AFCA, FWAA, NEA-2, UPI-2)
- Al Ecuyer, Notre Dame (UPI-1, CP, SN)
- Bob Novogratz, Army (AP-3, FWAA, NEA-2, UPI-3)
- John Wooten, Colorado (AFCA)
- Jerry Stalcup, Wisconsin (AP-2, NEA-3)
- Stan Renning, Montana (AP-3)
- Tom Koenig, SMU (UPI-3)
- George Fritzinger, Navy (NEA-3)

=== Centers ===
- Bob Harrison, Oklahoma (AP-1, FWAA, NEA-1, SN, UPI-1, CP, WC)
- Jackie Burkett, Auburn (AFCA, AP-2, NEA-2, UPI-3, Time)
- Max Fugler, LSU (AP-3, FWAA, NEA-3, UPI-2)

=== Quarterbacks ===
- Randy Duncan, Iowa (AFCA, AP-1, FWAA, NEA-1, SN, UPI-1, CP, WC)
- Joe Kapp, California (AP-3, FWAA, NEA-2, UPI-2, Time)
- Don Meredith, SMU (AP-2, FWAA, UPI-2)
- Tom Greene, Holy Cross (UPI-3)

=== Halfbacks ===
- Billy Cannon, LSU (AFCA, AP-1, FWAA, NEA-1, SN, UPI-1, CP, Time, WC)
- Pete Dawkins, Army (AFCA, AP-1, FWAA, NEA-1, SN, UPI-1, CP, WC)
- Bob Anderson, Army (AP-2, FWAA, NEA-2, UPI-2)
- Dick Bass, Pacific (AP-2, NEA-2, UPI-2, Time)
- Ron Burton, Northwestern (AP-3)
- Alex Hawkins, South Carolina (AP-3)
- Dick Thornton, Northwestern (UPI-3)
- Jake Crouthamel, Dartmouth (NEA-3)
- Don Perkins, New Mexico (NEA-3)

=== Fullbacks ===
- Bob White, Ohio State (AP-2, FWAA, NEA-1, SN, UPI-1, CP, Time, WC)
- Nick Pietrosante, Notre Dame (AFCA, AP-3, FWAA, NEA-2, UPI-3)
- Bill Austin, Rutgers (AP-1, UPI-3)
- Bob Jarus, Purdue (UPI-3)
- Fred Pickard, Florida State (NEA-3)

== Key ==
- **Bold** – Consensus All-American
- -1 – First-team selection
- -2 – Second-team selection
- -3 – Third-team selection

=== Official selectors ===
- AFCA = American Football Coaches Association
- AP = Associated Press
- FWAA = Football Writers Association of America
- NEA = Newspaper Enterprise Association
- SN = Sporting News
- UPI = United Press International

=== Other selectors ===
- CP = Central Press Association
- Time = Time magazine
- WC = Walter Camp Football Foundation

== See also ==
- 1958 All-Atlantic Coast Conference football team
- 1958 All-Big Eight Conference football team
- 1958 All-Big Ten Conference football team
- 1958 All-Pacific Coast Conference football team
- 1958 All-SEC football team
- 1958 All-Southwest Conference football team
