= Jack Rudolph (American football) =

American football player (1938–2019)

No. 80, 55
- Position: Linebacker

Personal information
- Born: March 21, 1938; St. Louis, Missouri, U.S.
- Died: June 23, 2019 (aged 81); Valdosta, Georgia, U.S.
- Listed height: 6 ft 3 in (1.91 m)
- Listed weight: 225 lb (102 kg)

Career information
- High school: Henry Grady (Atlanta, Georgia)
- College: Georgia Tech
- NFL draft: 1959: 17th round, 197th overall pick

Career history
- Boston Patriots (1960-1965); Miami Dolphins (1966)

Career AFL statistics
- Interceptions: 3
- Safeties: 1
- Sacks: 14.5
- Stats at Pro Football Reference

John Lawrence Rudolph (March 21, 1938 – June 23, 2019) was an American football player who played linebacker for six seasons in the American Football League (AFL), first for the Boston Patriots and then for the Miami Dolphins. Rudolph was an original Boston Patriot, and an original Miami Dolphin.

== See also ==
- List of American Football League players
