= George Deiderich =

American football player (1936–1999)

No. 51, 53, 52
- Position: Guard

Personal information
- Born: March 19, 1936; Pittsburgh, Pennsylvania, U.S.
- Died: July 2, 1999 (aged 63); Gallatin, Tennessee, U.S.
- Listed height: 6 ft 1 in (1.85 m)
- Listed weight: 210 lb (95 kg)

Career information
- High school: Valley Forge Military Academy
- College: Vanderbilt
- NFL draft: 1959: 23rd round, 272nd overall pick

Career history
- 1959–1961: Montreal Alouettes
- 1961: Ottawa Rough Riders

Awards and highlights
- Consensus All-American (1958); 2× First-team All-SEC (1957, 1958)

George R. Deiderich (March 19, 1936 – July 2, 1999), nicknamed Lulu Deiderich, was an American football player who was a consensus All-American guard for the Vanderbilt Commodores football team of Vanderbilt University. Afterward, Deiderich played professionally for three seasons in the Canadian Football League (CFL).

Deiderich was born in Pittsburgh, Pennsylvania. He attended Valley Forge Military Academy in Wayne, Pennsylvania, where he played for the Valley Forge Cadets high school football team.

Deiderich enrolled at Vanderbilt University in Nashville, Tennessee in 1955, where he played for coach Arthur Guepe's Vanderbilt Commodores football team from 1956 to 1958. He was a two-year starter at guard for the Commodores, and the team compiled a three-year win-loss-tie record of 15–10–5 during his college career.

He was a first-team All-Southeastern Conference selection in 1957 and 1958, and was recognized as a consensus first-team All-American in 1958, when he received first-team honors from the Associated Press (AP), America Football Coaches Association (AFCA), Football Writers Association of America (FWAA), and Look magazine, and second-team honors from United Press International (UPI).

After his college career, Deiderich was chosen by the Los Angeles Rams of the National Football League (NFL) in 23rd round, with the 272nd overall pick, of the 1959 NFL draft. Instead, however, he chose to sign with the Montreal Alouettes of the Canadian Football League, and he played two and a half seasons for the Alouettes from 1959 to 1961. Memorably, he had a 52-yard interception return for a touchdown while playing defense for the Alouettes in 1960. He finished his CFL pro career with the Ottawa Rough Riders during the second half of the 1961 CFL season. During his three-season CFL career, Deiderich appeared in 19 regular season games.

Deiderich died in 1999 in Gallatin, Tennessee; he was 63 years old.

== See also ==
- Vanderbilt Commodores
- List of Vanderbilt University people
