= Cliff Jackson (Canadian football) =

Canadian football player (born c.1937)

Profile
- Position: Halfback

Personal information
- Born: c. 1937 (age 88–89)
- Listed height: 6 ft 0 in (1.83 m)
- Listed weight: 185 lb (84 kg)

Career information
- College: North Carolina Central
- NFL draft: 1959: 30th round, 356th overall pick

Career history
- 1959–1960: Edmonton Eskimos

Cliff Jackson (born c. 1937) is a former Canadian football player who played for the Edmonton Eskimos. He played college football at the North Carolina Central University. Jackson was drafted 356th overall by the Chicago Bears in the last round of the 1959 NFL draft, but did not play in the league.
