= Boyd Dowler =

American football player, coach, and scout (born 1937)

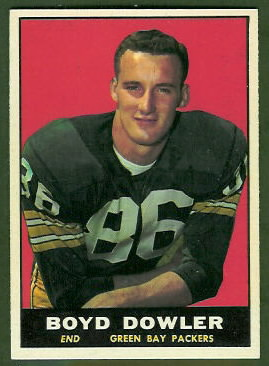
- Dowler on a 1961 Topps trading card

No. 86
- Position: Wide receiver

Personal information
- Born: October 18, 1937 (age 89); Rock Springs, Wyoming, U.S.
- Listed height: 6 ft 5 in (1.96 m)
- Listed weight: 224 lb (102 kg)

Career information
- High school: Cheyenne (Cheyenne, Wyoming)
- College: Colorado (1955–1958)
- NFL draft: 1959: 3rd round, 25th overall pick

Career history

Playing
- Green Bay Packers (1959–1969); Washington Redskins (1971)

Coaching
- Los Angeles Rams (1970) Wide receivers coach; Washington Redskins (1971–1972) Wide receivers coach; Philadelphia Eagles (1973–1975) Wide receivers coach & pass game coordinator; Cincinnati Bengals (1976–1979) Quarterbacks/Receivers (76-77), Receivers (78-79); Tampa Bay Buccaneers (1980–1982) Wide receivers coach; Tampa Bay Buccaneers (1983–1984) Quarterbacks coach

Awards and highlights
- 2× Super Bowl champion (I, II); 5× NFL champion (1961, 1962, 1965, 1966, 1967); NFL Rookie of the Year (1959); Second-team All-Pro (1967); 2× Pro Bowl (1965, 1967); NFL 1960s All-Decade Team; Green Bay Packers Hall of Fame; First-team All-Big Eight (1958); Second-team All-Big Eight (1957)

Career NFL statistics
- Receptions: 474
- Receiving yards: 7,270
- Receiving touchdowns: 40
- Punts: 93
- Punting yards: 3,987
- Longest punt: 75
- Stats at Pro Football Reference

Boyd Hamilton Dowler (born October 18, 1937) is an American former professional football player who was a wide receiver in the National Football League (NFL). He played 12 seasons from 1959 to 1971, eleven with the Green Bay Packers and one with the Washington Redskins. With Green Bay, he was part of the Vince Lombardi dynasty era that saw five NFL championships.

== Early life ==
Born in Rock Springs, Wyoming, Dowler grew up in Cheyenne, where his father Walter was a high school history teacher, who was also a former football coach who had played college football for Wyoming. Boyd was a three-sport athlete at Cheyenne High School.

== College career ==
He played college football for the Colorado Buffaloes as a single-wing quarterback under head coach Dal Ward.

Dowler led the Big Seven conference in receiving as a junior in 1957, but spent more time as a passer and runner during his senior season. While at Colorado, he was a member of Delta Tau Delta fraternity.

== Professional football career ==
The 25th overall pick in the 1959 NFL draft, Dowler was the NFL rookie of the year in 1959, Vince Lombardi's first season as head coach. Dowler was a two-time Pro Bowler in 1965 and 1967, and a key contributor on the Packers dynasty in the 1960s, assisting the team to five NFL championship wins and victories in Super Bowls I and II.

A late hit by Dallas Cowboys defensive back Mike Gaechter in the end zone following a third quarter touchdown catch resulted in a shoulder injury in the 1966 NFL Championship Game. Dowler aggravated the shoulder early in the first quarter of the first Super Bowl two weeks later on a hit by Fred "The Hammer" Williamson, allowing seldom-used Max McGee to be a significant contributor in the game with two touchdown catches. Dowler made a big impact the following year Packers: in the 1967 Ice Bowl Bart Starr to Boyd Dowler (8-yard TD) Packers: Bart Starr to Boyd Dowler (43-yard TD) also on the Key Final Drive with a great catch when he was thrown onto the ice and hit his head. Then in Super Bowl II with a 62-yard touchdown reception from quarterback Bart Starr in the first half. He finished the game as the top receiver for the Packers, with two receptions for 71 yards and a touchdown. Dowler is a member of the Green Bay Packers Hall of Fame and the NFL 1960s All-Decade Team.

After eleven seasons with the Packers ending in 1969, Dowler played one year for the Washington Redskins in 1971. He had been acquired from the Packers for the Redskins' 1971 fifth-round pick (124th overall–Jim Stillwagon) which had been obtained from the Los Angeles Rams earlier on January 28, 1971. Dowler was on George Allen's coaching staff with the Rams in 1970 and made the transition with him to Washington as a player-coach.

== Career statistics ==
Dowler retired with a career record of 474 receptions for 7,270 yards and 40 touchdowns. He led the Packers in receptions for seven seasons.

== Post career ==
Following his playing career, Dowler spent over 30 years working as an assistant coach and scout in the NFL. He was also announced as the head coach for the Tampa Bay Outlaws of the Professional Spring Football League in 1992, but the league folded before playing a game. Notable positions that Dowler held included the passing game coordinator role for the Philadelphia Eagles from 1973 to 1975 and, his final stop, a scout for the Atlanta Falcons. Dowler retired as a scout in 2007.

== NFL career statistics ==
Legend
	Won the NFL championship
	Super Bowl champion
	Led the league
**Bold**	Career high

=== Regular season ===
Year	Team	Games		Receiving				
Year	Team	GP	GS	Rec	Yds	Avg	Lng	TD
1959	GB	12	6	32	549	17.2	35	4
1960	GB	12	12	30	505	16.8	**91**	2
1961	GB	**14**	**14**	36	633	**17.6**	78	3
1962	GB	**14**	**14**	49	724	14.8	41	2
1963	GB	**14**	**14**	53	**901**	17.0	53	**6**
1964	GB	**14**	**14**	45	623	13.8	50	5
1965	GB	**14**	**14**	44	610	13.9	47	4
1966	GB	**14**	**14**	29	392	13.5	40	0
1967	GB	**14**	**14**	**54**	836	15.5	57	4
1968	GB	**14**	**14**	45	668	14.8	72	**6**
1969	GB	**14**	**14**	31	477	15.4	45	4
1971	WAS	12	7	26	352	13.5	30	0
Career		162	150	474	7,270	15.3	91	40
