= List of Oklahoma State Cowboys in the NFL draft =

The Oklahoma State Cowboys football team has had 176 players drafted into the National Football League (NFL) since the league began holding drafts in 1936. (Note: Because of the NFL–AFL merger agreement, the history of the AFL is officially recognized by the NFL and therefore this list includes the AFL draft (1960–1966) and the common draft (1967–1969).)

Each NFL franchise seeks to add new players through the annual NFL draft. The draft rules were last updated in 2009. The team with the worst record the previous year picks first, the next-worst team second, and so on. Teams that did not make the playoffs are ordered by their regular-season record with any remaining ties broken by strength of schedule. Playoff participants are sequenced after non-playoff teams, based on their round of elimination (wild card, division, conference, and Super Bowl).

Before the merger agreements in 1966, the American Football League (AFL) operated in direct competition with the NFL and held a separate draft. This led to a massive bidding war over top prospects between the two leagues. As part of the merger agreement on June 8, 1966, the two leagues would hold a multiple round "common draft". Once the AFL officially merged with the NFL in 1970, the "common draft" simply became the NFL draft.

== Key ==
| B | Back | K | Kicker | NT | Nose tackle |
| C | Center | LB | Linebacker | FB | Fullback |
| DB | Defensive back | P | Punter | HB | Halfback |
| DE | Defensive end | QB | Quarterback | WR | Wide receiver |
| DT | Defensive tackle | RB | Running back | G | Guard |
| E | End | T | Offensive tackle | TE | Tight end |

| * | Selected to a Pro Bowl |
| † | Won an NFL championship |
| ‡ | Selected to a Pro Bowl and won an NFL championship |

== Selections ==
| Year (Note: From 1960 through 1966, teams with a superscript AFL denotes player drafted in the AFL draft and teams with a superscript NFL denotes a player drafted in the NFL draft.) | Round | Pick | Player | Team | Position | Notes |
|---|---|---|---|---|---|---|
| 1939 | 20 | 186 | George Vogeler | Chicago Bears | C | — |
| 1940 | 17 | 151 | Ralph Foster | Chicago Cardinals | T | — |
| 1942 | 14 | 124 | Hugh Swink | Chicago Cardinals | T | — |
| 1943 | 14 | 128 | Ralph Tate | Green Bay Packers | B | — |
| 1943 | 14 | 129 | Loyd Arms | Chicago Bears | G | — |
| 1943 | 20 | 181 | Al Scanland | Detroit Lions | B | — |
| 1943 | 23 | 216 | Gene Hoeman | New York Giants | E | — |
| 1945 | 19 | 195 | Joe Spencer | Philadelphia Eagles | T | — |
| 1945 | 19 | 197 | Ed Jeffers | Green Bay Packers | T | — |
| 1945 | 20 | 206 | Leo Pratt | Philadelphia Eagles | T | — |
| 1945 | 24 | 250 | Blair Brown | Philadelphia Eagles | G | — |
| 1945 | 28 | 287 | Jim Marsh | Pittsburgh Steelers | T | — |
| 1945 | 32 | 330 | Billy Joe Aldridge | Green Bay Packers | B | — |
| 1946 | 8 | 66 | Bert Cole | Green Bay Packers | T | — |
| 1946 | 9 | 71 | Jake Colhouer | Chicago Cardinals | G | — |
| 1946 | 32 | 297 | Otis Schellstede | Detroit Lions | G | — |
| 1947 | 1 | 1 | Bob Fenimore | Chicago Bears | B | — |
| 1947 | 1 | 8 | Neill Armstrong | Philadelphia Eagles | E | — |
| 1947 | 11 | 92 | Tom Moulton | Green Bay Packers | C | — |
| 1947 | 24 | 223 | J. D. Cheek | Los Angeles Rams | T | — |
| 1948 | 1 | 11 | Jim Spavital | Chicago Cardinals | FB | — |
| 1948 | 17 | 155 | Clay Davis | Chicago Cardinals | C | — |
| 1948 | 20 | 182 | Thurman Gay | Chicago Bears | T | — |
| 1948 | 25 | 234 | Jim Parmer | Philadelphia Eagles | B | — |
| 1949 | 2 | 20 | Billy Grimes | Chicago Bears | B | — |
| 1949 | 5 | 45 | Bill Long | Pittsburgh Steelers | E | — |
| 1949 | 5 | 46 | J. D. Cheek | New York Giants | G | — |
| 1949 | 6 | 52 | Bob Meinert | Detroit Lions | B | — |
| 1950 | 6 | 68 | Ben Aldridge | New York Bulldogs | B | — |
| 1950 | 6 | 75 | Don Van Pool | San Francisco 49ers | E | — |
| 1950 | 12 | 154 | Kenny Roof | Chicago Bears | B | — |
| 1950 | 13 | 162 | Clay Davis | Washington Redskins | C | — |
| 1950 | 15 | 188 | Alex Loyd | Washington Redskins | E | — |
| 1950 | 16 | 205 | Charlie Shaw | San Francisco 49ers | G | — |
| 1950 | 30 | 382 | Rube DeRoin | Cleveland Browns | C | — |
| 1951 | 1 | 13 | Jim Spavital | New York Giants | B | — |
| 1951 | 17 | 200 | Darrel Meisenheimer | Detroit Lions | DB | — |
| 1951 | 18 | 219 | Rube DeRoin | Cleveland Browns | C | — |
| 1952 | 17 | 197 | John Weigle | Philadelphia Eagles | E | — |
| 1952 | 27 | 321 | Waldo Schaaf | San Francisco 49ers | T | — |
| 1954 | 4 | 38 | Bill Bredde | Chicago Cardinals | B | — |
| 1954 | 26 | 308 | Dorsey Gibson | Washington Redskins | B | — |
| 1955 | 5 | 59 | Leland Kendall | Chicago Bears | T | — |
| 1955 | 8 | 88 | Dale Meinert | Baltimore Colts | LB | — |
| 1955 | 8 | 93 | Freddie Meyers | San Francisco 49ers | B | — |
| 1956 | 23 | 270 | Chet Spencer | Philadelphia Eagles | E | — |
| 1956 | 26 | 305 | Earl Lunsford | Philadelphia Eagles | B | — |
| 1956 | 27 | 317 | Jack Hutchinson | Chicago Cardinals | T | — |
| 1957 | 13 | 149 | Dwaine Underwood | Pittsburgh Steelers | T | — |
| 1958 | 26 | 308 | Jon Evans | Pittsburgh Steelers | E | — |
| 1959 | 4 | 40 | Jim Wood | Washington Redskins | E | — |
| 1959 | 12 | 134 | Howard Keys | Philadelphia Eagles | C | — |
| 1959 | 24 | 278 | Gerry Benn | Philadelphia Eagles | T | — |
| 1960 | 8 | 89 | Don Hitt | Green Bay Packers | C | — |
| 1961 | 3 | 32 | Harold Beaty | Los Angeles Rams | G | — |
| 1961 | 6 | 79 | Frank Parker | Cleveland Browns | T | — |
| 1962 | 4 | 51 | Jim Dillard | Baltimore Colts | B | — |
| 1962 | 7 | 98 | Gary Cutsinger | Green Bay Packers | T | — |
| 1965 | 13 | 179 | Jack Jacobson | Detroit Lions | B | — |
| 1966 | 5 | 79 | Walt Garrison | Dallas Cowboys | RB | — |
| 1966 | 8 | 113 | Charlie Harper | New York Giants | T | — |
| 1967 | 3 | 66 | Dennis Randall | New York Jets | DE | — |
| 1967 | 3 | 67 | Harold Akin | San Diego Chargers | T | — |
| 1967 | 3 | 71 | Leon Ward | Baltimore Colts | LB | — |
| 1967 | 12 | 307 | J. B. Christian | Baltimore Colts | G | — |
| 1967 | 17 | 435 | Terry Bacigalupo | St. Louis Cardinals | DE | — |
| 1969 | 3 | 56 | Jon Kolb | Pittsburgh Steelers | T | — |
| 1969 | 3 | 73 | Terry Brown | St. Louis Cardinals | DB | — |
| 1970 | 1 | 25 | John Ward | Minnesota Vikings | G | — |
| 1970 | 2 | 47 | Jerry Sherk | Cleveland Browns | DT | — |
| 1970 | 6 | 131 | Bob Cutburth | Chicago Bears | QB | — |
| 1970 | 14 | 358 | John Little | New York Jets | DT | — |
| 1971 | 17 | 428 | Hermann Eben | New Orleans Saints | WR | — |
| 1972 | 17 | 424 | Dick Graham | New England Patriots | WR | — |
| 1974 | 1 | 18 | Reuben Gant | Buffalo Bills | TE | — |
| 1974 | 3 | 57 | Glenn Robinson | Baltimore Colts | DE | — |
| 1974 | 5 | 130 | Cleveland Vann | Miami Dolphins | LB | — |
| 1974 | 8 | 206 | Bon Boatwright | San Diego Chargers | DT | — |
| 1975 | 8 | 194 | Leonard Thompson | Detroit Lions | WR | — |
| 1976 | 1 | 25 | James White | Minnesota Vikings | DT | — |
| 1976 | 7 | 197 | Larry Harris | Houston Oilers | DT | — |
| 1977 | 1 | 12 | Phil Dokes | Buffalo Bills | DT | — |
| 1977 | 6 | 147 | Cliff Parsley | New Orleans Saints | P | — |
| 1977 | 7 | 172 | Derrel Gofourth | Green Bay Packers | G | — |
| 1977 | 9 | 237 | Robert Turner | Miami Dolphins | RB | — |
| 1977 | 10 | 277 | Ron Baker | Baltimore Colts | G | — |
| 1978 | 1 | 5 | Terry Miller | Buffalo Bills | RB | — |
| 1978 | 2 | 41 | Milton Hardaway | San Diego Chargers | T | — |
| 1978 | 12 | 320 | Daria Butler | Atlanta Falcons | LB | — |
| 1979 | 9 | 223 | Scott Burk | Cincinnati Bengals | DB | — |
| 1979 | 10 | 254 | Steve Stephens | Baltimore Colts | TE | — |
| 1980 | 5 | 134 | John Corker | Houston Oilers | LB | — |
| 1980 | 8 | 217 | Harold Bailey | Houston Oilers | WR | — |
| 1981 | 3 | 75 | Roger Taylor | Kansas City Chiefs | T | — |
| 1981 | 5 | 119 | Dexter Manley | Washington Redskins | DE | — |
| 1981 | 10 | 271 | Dean Prater | Cleveland Browns | DE | — |
| 1982 | 11 | 301 | Ron Ingram | Philadelphia Eagles | WR | — |
| 1982 | 12 | 313 | Ricky Young | Chicago Bears | LB | — |
| 1983 | 4 | 86 | Greg Hill | Houston Oilers | DB | — |
| 1983 | 4 | 98 | Gary Lewis | New Orleans Saints | DT | — |
| 1983 | 9 | 245 | Mike Green | San Diego Chargers | LB | — |
| 1984 | 2 | 48 | Chris Rockins | Cleveland Browns | DB | — |
| 1984 | 3 | 74 | Ernest Anderson | Detroit Lions | RB | — |
| 1984 | 10 | 268 | James Spencer | Minnesota Vikings | LB | — |
| 1984 | 10 | 277 | John Chesley | Miami Dolphins | TE | — |
| 1984 | 12 | 309 | Rod Fisher | Los Angeles Rams | DB | — |
| 1985 | 6 | 143 | Rusty Hilger | Los Angeles Raiders | QB | — |
| 1985 | 7 | 177 | Jamie Harris | Washington Redskins | WR | — |
| 1985 | 8 | 208 | Matt Monger | New York Jets | LB | — |
| 1985 | 9 | 251 | Adam Hinds | Miami Dolphins | DB | — |
| 1985 | 12 | 332 | Raymond Polk | Los Angeles Raiders | DB | — |
| 1986 | 1 | 8 | Leslie O'Neal | San Diego Chargers | DE | — |
| 1986 | 3 | 73 | John Washington | New York Giants | DE | — |
| 1986 | 4 | 110 | Paul Blair | Chicago Bears | T | — |
| 1986s | 7 | 0 | Charles Crawford | Philadelphia Eagles | RB | — |
| 1987 | 4 | 104 | Mark Moore | Seattle Seahawks | DB | — |
| 1988 | 2 | 40 | Thurman Thomas | Buffalo Bills | RB | — |
| 1988 | 4 | 92 | Ricky Shaw | New York Giants | LB | — |
| 1989 | 1 | 3 | Barry Sanders | Detroit Lions | RB | — |
| 1989 | 1 | 16 | Hart Lee Dykes | New England Patriots | WR | — |
| 1991 | 9 | 232 | Gerald Hudson | Minnesota Vikings | RB | — |
| 1991 | 10 | 253 | Curtis Mayfield | Denver Broncos | WR | — |
| 1992 | 12 | 325 | Corey Williams | Kansas City Chiefs | DB | — |
| 1994 | 3 | 88 | Jason Gildon | Pittsburgh Steelers | LB | — |
| 1994 | 7 | 210 | Keith Burns | Denver Broncos | LB | — |
| 1995 | 4 | 130 | Linc Harden | Dallas Cowboys | LB | — |
| 1996 | 4 | 108 | Jevon Langford | Cincinnati Bengals | DE | — |
| 1998 | 1 | 28 | R. W. McQuarters | San Francisco 49ers | DB | — |
| 1998 | 3 | 87 | Kevin Williams | New York Jets | DB | — |
| 1998 | 4 | 94 | Alonzo Mayes | Chicago Bears | TE | — |
| 1998s | 2 | 0 | Jamal Williams | San Diego Chargers | DT | — |
| 2000 | 2 | 62 | Jacoby Shepherd | St. Louis Rams | DB | — |
| 2000 | 7 | 250 | Ethan Howell | Washington Redskins | DB | — |
| 2003 | 1 | 9 | Kevin Williams | Minnesota Vikings | DE | — |
| 2004 | 1 | 31 | Rashaun Woods | San Francisco 49ers | WR | — |
| 2004 | 2 | 41 | Tatum Bell | Denver Broncos | RB | — |
| 2004 | 5 | 135 | Antonio Smith | Arizona Cardinals | DE | — |
| 2005 | 2 | 56 | Darrent Williams | Denver Broncos | DB | — |
| 2005 | 3 | 73 | Vernand Morency | Houston Texans | RB | — |
| 2005 | 7 | 249 | Billy Bajema | San Francisco 49ers | TE | — |
| 2006 | 6 | 199 | Charlie Johnson | Indianapolis Colts | T | — |
| 2007 | 4 | 132 | Ryan McBean | Pittsburgh Steelers | DE | — |
| 2007 | 6 | 209 | Corey Hilliard | New England Patriots | T | — |
| 2009 | 1 | 20 | Brandon Pettigrew | Detroit Lions | TE | — |
2010
| 2010 | 1 | 6 | Russell Okung^{‡} | Seattle Seahawks | T | Super Bowl Champion (XLVIII); Pro Bowl (2012, 2017) |
| 2010 | 1 | 24 | Dez Bryant | Dallas Cowboys | WR | — |
| 2010 | 5 | 137 | Perrish Cox | Denver Broncos | DB | — |
| 2010 | 7 | 250 | Zac Robinson | New England Patriots | QB | — |
| 2011 | 4 | 115 | Kendall Hunter | San Francisco 49ers | RB | — |
| 2012 | 1 | 5 | Justin Blackmon | Jacksonville Jaguars | WR | — |
| 2012 | 1 | 22 | Brandon Weeden | Cleveland Browns | QB | — |
| 2012 | 6 | 190 | Markelle Martin | Tennessee Titans | DB | — |
| 2013 | 5 | 151 | Joseph Randle | Dallas Cowboys | RB | — |
| 2014 | 1 | 8 | Justin Gilbert | Cleveland Browns | DB | — |
| 2015 | 7 | 252 | Josh Furman | Denver Broncos | DB | — |
2016
| 2016 | 2 | 32 | Emmanuel Ogbah† | Cleveland Browns | DE | Super Bowl Champion (LIV) |
| 2017 | 6 | 194 | Vincent Taylor | Miami Dolphins | DT | — |
| 2017 | 7 | 249 | Chris Carson | Seattle Seahawks | RB | — |
| 2018 | 2 | 60 | James Washington | Pittsburgh Steelers | WR | — |
| 2018 | 3 | 76 | Mason Rudolph | Pittsburgh Steelers | QB | — |
| 2018 | 5 | 146 | Tre Flowers | Seattle Seahawks | DB | — |
| 2018 | 7 | 228 | Marcell Ateman | Oakland Raiders | WR | — |
| 2019 | 4 | 113 | Justice Hill | Baltimore Ravens | RB | — |
| 2019 | 7 | 253 | Jordan Brailford | Washington Redskins | DE | — |
| 2021 | 2 | 39 | Teven Jenkins | Chicago Bears | T | — |
| 2021 | 4 | 126 | Chuba Hubbard | Carolina Panthers | RB | — |
| 2021 | 4 | 131 | Tylan Wallace | Baltimore Ravens | WR | — |
| 2021 | 6 | 201 | Rodarius Williams | New York Giants | DB | — |
| 2022 | 6 | 188 | Malcolm Rodriguez | Detroit Lions | LB | — |
| 2022 | 6 | 193 | Devin Harper | Dallas Cowboys | LB | — |
| 2022 | 7 | 240 | Christian Holmes | Washington Commanders | DB | — |
| 2023 | 4 | 130 | Tyler Lacy | Jacksonville Jaguars | DE | — |
| 2023 | 7 | 234 | Jason Taylor II | Los Angeles Rams | DB | — |
| 2025 | 3 | 75 | Nick Martin | San Francisco 49ers | LB | — |
| 2025 | 5 | 139 | Collin Oliver | Green Bay Packers | LB | — |
| 2025 | 6 | 179 | Ollie Gordon II | Miami Dolphins | RB | — |
| 2025 | 7 | 246 | Korie Black | New York Giants | DB | — |

== Notable undrafted players ==
Note: No drafts held before 1920

| Year | Player | Position | Debut Team | Notes |
|---|---|---|---|---|
| 1967 | Charlie Durkee | K | New Orleans Saints | — |
| 1976 | Reggie Pierson | DB | Detroit Lions | — |
| 1979 | Calvin Miller | DT | Atlanta Falcons | — |
| 1980 | Donnie Echols | TE | Houston Oilers | — |
| 1981 | Gregg Johnson | S | Seattle Seahawks | — |
| 2000 | Jack Golden | LB | New York Giants | — |
| 2000 | Kenyatta Wright | LB | Buffalo Bills | — |
| 2001 | Juqua Parker | DE | Tennessee Titans | — |
| 2001 | Marcellus Rivers | TE | New York Giants | — |
| 2019 | Tyron Billy-Johnson | WR | Houston Texans | — |
| 2022 | Tay Martin | WR | San Francisco 49ers | — |
| 2022 | Josh Sills | OG | Philadelphia Eagles | — |
| 2022 | Jaylen Warren | RB | Pittsburgh Steelers | — |
| 2023 | Tanner Brown | PK | Los Angeles Rams | — |
| 2024 | Elijah Collins | RB | Cincinnati Bengals | — |
| 2024 | Alex Hale | PK | Green Bay Packers | — |
| 2024 | Leon Johnson | WR | Los Angeles Chargers | — |
| 2025 | Dalton Cooper | OT | Kansas City Chiefs | — |
| 2025 | Joe Michalski | OL | Denver Broncos | — |
| 2025 | Rashod Owens | WR | Cincinnati Bengals | — |
| 2025 | Brennan Presley | WR | Los Angeles Rams | — |
| 2025 | Trey Rucker | S | Washington Commanders | — |
| 2026 | Terrill Davis | WR | Minnesota Vikings | — |
| 2026 | Kenneth Harris | CB | New England Patriots | — |
| 2026 | Wes Pahl | P | Cleveland Browns | — |
| 2026 | Parker Robertson | S | Denver Broncos | — |
