= List of Delaware Fightin' Blue Hens in the NFL draft =

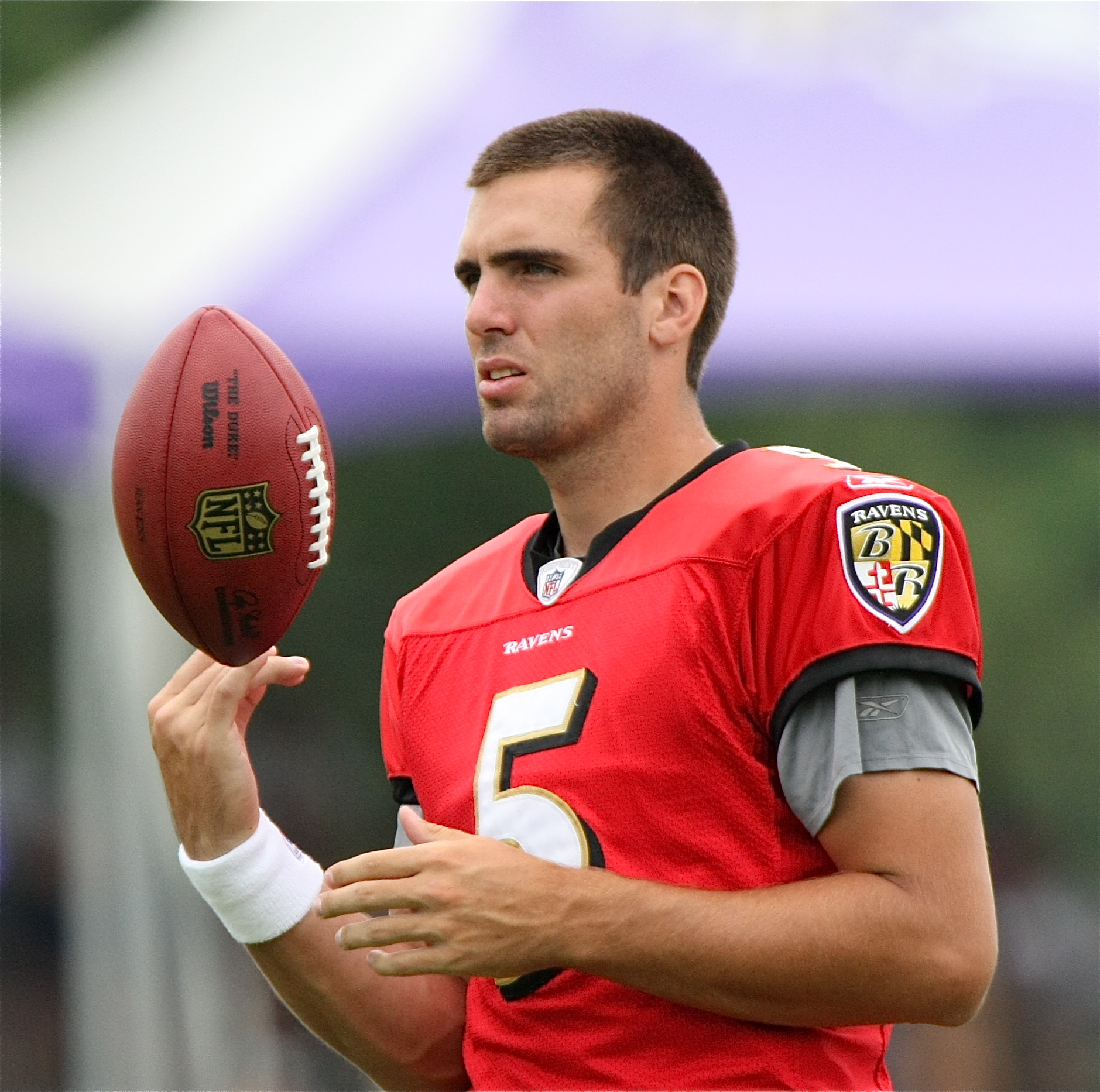
Joe Flacco was drafted 18th overall by the Baltimore Ravens in the 2008 NFL draft. He is the highest drafted Blue Hen in NFL draft history, and the only one taken in the first round.

The Delaware Fightin' Blue Hens football team, representing the University of Delaware, has had 29 players drafted into the National Football League (NFL) since the league began holding drafts in 1936. (Note: Because of the NFL–AFL merger agreement, the history of the AFL is officially recognized by the NFL and therefore this list includes the AFL draft (1960–1966) and the common draft (1967–1969).) This includes one player taken in the first round, Joe Flacco in the 2008 NFL draft. The Oakland/Los Angeles Raiders franchise has drafted the most Fightin' Blue Hens with five. Fifteen NFL teams have drafted at least one player from Delaware. Two former Blue Hens have been selected to Pro Bowls: Rich Gannon, who earned four selections as a member of the Raiders after being selected in the fourth round of the 1987 NFL draft by the New England Patriots, and Mike Adams, who earned two selections as a member of the Indianapolis Colts after going undrafted in 2004.. First team all-American offensive guard Jeff Rosen signed with the Washington Redskins after the 1986 draft and made the team roster but sustained a career ending injury in the practices before the game in week 1 of the regular season

Each NFL franchise seeks to add new players through the annual NFL draft. The draft rules were last updated in 2009. The team with the worst record the previous year picks first, the next-worst team second, and so on. Teams that did not make the playoffs are ordered by their regular-season record with any remaining ties broken by strength of schedule. Playoff participants are sequenced after non-playoff teams, based on their round of elimination (wild card, division, conference, and Super Bowl).

Before the merger agreements in 1966, the American Football League (AFL) operated in direct competition with the NFL and held a separate draft. This led to a massive bidding war over top prospects between the two leagues. As part of the merger agreement on June 8, 1966, the two leagues would hold a multiple round "common draft". Once the AFL officially merged with the NFL in 1970, the common draft simply became the NFL draft.

== Key ==
B	Back (Note: In American and Canadian football, a back is a player who is lined up behind the linemen, the players who line up closest to the line of scrimmage.)	K	Kicker	NT	Nose tackle
C	Center	LB	Linebacker	FB	Fullback
DB	Defensive back	P	Punter	HB	Halfback
DE	Defensive end	QB	Quarterback	WR	Wide receiver
DT	Defensive tackle	RB	Running back	G	Guard
E	End	T	Offensive tackle	TE	Tight end

^{†}	Selected to an all-star game
^{‡}	Won a league championship
^{♦}	Selected to an all-star game and won a league championship

== Selections ==
=== American Football League ===
Year	Round	Pick	Player	Team	Position	Notes
1960	N/A	N/A	Leon Dombrowski	Oakland Raiders	LB	—

=== National Football League ===
Year	Round	Pick	Player	Team	Position	Notes
1943	32	300	Bo Bogovich	Washington Redskins	G	—
1947	21	187	Paul Hart	Boston Yanks	B	—
1947	30	278	Tom Stalloni	Pittsburgh Steelers	T	—
1955	11	131	Tom Redfield	Chicago Bears	E	—
1962	15	206	Dick Broadbent	Detroit Lions	E	—
1964	10	140	Mike Brown	Chicago Bears	B	—
1967	11	274	Herb Slattery	New York Jets	G	—
1971	6	141	Conway Hayman	Washington Redskins	G	—
1971	8	200	Ted Gregory	New York Giants	DE	—
1971	15	389	Bob Young	Dallas Cowboys	DE	—
1973	10	243	Joe Carbone	New York Jets	DE	—
1973	13	337	Dennis Johnson	Washington Redskins	DT	—
1976	17	481	Nate Beasley	Oakland Raiders	FB	—
1979	9	231	Jeff Komlo	Detroit Lions	QB	—
1980	6	145	Scott Brunner	New York Giants	QB	—
1981	12	332	Phil Nelson	Oakland Raiders	TE	—
1983	6	157	George Schmitt	St. Louis Cardinals	DB	—
1985	5	135	Dan Reeder	Los Angeles Raiders	RB	—
1987	4	98	Rich Gannon^{†}	New England Patriots	QB	Pro Bowl (2000, 2001, 2002, 2003)
1987	12	311	Joe McGrail	Buffalo Bills	DT	—
2002	5	203	Jamin Elliott^{‡}	Chicago Bears	WR	Won Super Bowl XXXVIII
2004	6	166	Shawn Johnson	Oakland Raiders	DE	—
2004	6	185	Andy Hall	Philadelphia Eagles	QB	—
2007	7	215	Ben Patrick	Arizona Cardinals	TE	—
2008	1	18	Joe Flacco^{‡}	Baltimore Ravens	QB	Won Super Bowl XLVII
2012	4	98	Gino Gradkowski^{‡}	Baltimore Ravens	C	Won Super Bowl XLVII
2015	5	171	Nick Boyle	Baltimore Ravens	TE	—
2018	5	145	Bilal Nichols	Chicago Bears	DT	—
2019	2	60	Nasir Adderley	Los Angeles Chargers	DB	—

== Notable undrafted players ==
Note: No drafts held before 1920

Debut year	Player name	Position	Debut NFL/AFL team	Notes
1976	Bob Patton	C	Buffalo Bills	—
1979	Ivory Sully	S	Los Angeles Rams	—
1986	Joe McHale	LB	Washington Redskins	—
1986	Jeff Rosen	OG	Washington Redskins	—
1987	Jeff Modesitt	TE	Tampa Bay Buccaneers	—
1993	Tim Jacobs	DB	Cleveland Browns	—
2003	Keith Burnell	RB/CB	Green Bay Packers	—
2004	Mike Adams	S	San Francisco 49ers	—
2009	Ronald Talley	DE	Green Bay Packers	—
2011	Pat Devlin	QB	Miami Dolphins	—
2011	Anthony Walters	S	Chicago Bears	—
2013	Marcus Burley	CB	Jacksonville Jaguars	—
2013	Paul Worrilow	LB	Atlanta Falcons	—
2014	Zach Kerr	DT	Indianapolis Colts	—
2019	Troy Reeder	LB	Los Angeles Rams	—
2019	Charles Scarff	TE	Baltimore Ravens	—
2023	Nolan Henderson	QB	Baltimore Ravens	—
2025	Tyron Herring	CB	Green Bay Packers	—
2026	Kyre Duplessis	WR	Detroit Lions	—
