= John Huarte =

American football player (born 1944)

No. 7
- Position: Quarterback

Personal information
- Born: April 6, 1944 (age 82); Anaheim, California, U.S.
- Listed height: 6 ft 0 in (1.83 m)
- Listed weight: 185 lb (84 kg)

Career information
- High school: Mater Dei (Santa Ana, California)
- College: Notre Dame (1962–1964)
- NFL draft: 1965: 6th round, 76th overall pick
- AFL draft: 1965: 2nd round, 12th overall pick

Career history
- New York Jets (1965); Boston Patriots (1966–1967); Philadelphia Eagles (1968); Kansas City Chiefs (1969–1971); Chicago Bears (1972); Memphis Southmen (1974–1975)

Awards and highlights
- Super Bowl champion (IV); National champion (1964); Heisman Trophy (1964); UPI Player of the Year (1964); Consensus All-American (1964)

Career AFL/NFL statistics
- Passing attempts: 48
- Passing completions: 19
- Completion percentage: 39.6%
- TD–INT: 1–5
- Passing yards: 230
- Passer rating: 22.4
- Stats at Pro Football Reference
- College Football Hall of Fame

John Gregory Huarte (/ˈhjuərt/ HYOO-ərt); born April 6, 1944) is an American former professional football player who was a quarterback with several teams in the American Football League (AFL), National Football League (NFL), and World Football League (WFL) between 1965 and 1975. He played college football for the Notre Dame Fighting Irish, winning the 1964 Heisman Trophy. He was inducted into the College Football Hall of Fame in 2005.

== Early life and college ==
Huarte was born and raised in Orange County, California; his father Joseph was a former minor league baseball player of Basque descent. The family ran an orange and avocado ranch and he graduated from Mater Dei High School in Santa Ana in 1961.

Huarte played college football for the Notre Dame Fighting Irish. During his sophomore and junior seasons, he averaged only a few minutes per game due to injuries and the Irish went 5–5 and 2–7, respectively. As a senior in 1964 under new Irish head coach Ara Parseghian however, he became the starting quarterback as the Irish won all but one game during the 1964 season, in which he was selected as an All-American and won the Heisman Trophy. By the end of the season, Huarte threw for 2,062 yards with only 205 passes, an average of over ten yards per pass attempt, many to receiver Jack Snow.

Huarte was a member of the College All-Star team in the annual pre-season game against the defending NFL champions at Chicago's Soldier Field. The 1965 game was in early August against the Cleveland Browns and Huarte was named the game's most valuable player.

== Professional career ==
Huarte was drafted in 1965 by both pro football leagues: he was the twelfth overall selection of the AFL draft and the 76th pick of the NFL draft. He signed with the AFL's New York Jets over the NFL Philadelphia Eagles, but was beaten out for the starting position by fellow-rookie Joe Namath, the first pick of the AFL draft, who had finished eleventh in the Heisman voting as a senior at Alabama. The AFL Jets thus signed both the Heisman Trophy winner and the Alabama star away from the NFL. Huarte was third on the depth chart behind co-starters Namath and Mike Taliaferro and was on the taxi squad. Following the 1965 season, Huarte was traded to the Boston Patriots for Jim Colclough and the draft rights to Wichita State linebacker/center Jim Waskiewicz.

Subsequently, Huarte did see action as a back-up quarterback for several other professional teams from 1966 to 1972. Out of the NFL in 1973, he played his final two seasons of professional football as the starting quarterback of the Memphis Southmen of the World Football League, which folded before the completion of the 1975 season.

== After football ==
Huarte is the founder and owner of Arizona Tile. In 2005, he was inducted into the College Football Hall of Fame.

Huarte is married to Eileen Devine from Woodside, New York. They have 5 children and 14 grandchildren and live in Pacific Palisades, Ca. In 1977, he started a tile/granite store in San Diego. It has now grown to 30 locations, with over 1000 employees throughout the United States. It is still family owned and operated by John and Eileen Huarte and their children.

== Career statistics ==
Season	Team	Games	Passing								Rushing			
Season	Team	G	Cmp	Att	Pct	Yds	Avg	TD	Int	Rtg	Att	Yds	Avg	TD
1962	Notre Dame	10	4	8	50.0	38	4.8	0	0	89.9	3	-14	-4.7	0
1963	Notre Dame	9	20	42	47.6	243	5.8	1	0	104.1	11	-53	-4.8	0
1964	Notre Dame	10	114	205	55.6	2,062	10.1	16	11	155.1	37	7	0.2	3
Total		29	138	255	54.1%	2,343	9.2	17	11	144.7	51	-60	-1.2	3

== See also ==
- List of American Football League players
