= Dez Bryant =

American football player (born 1988)

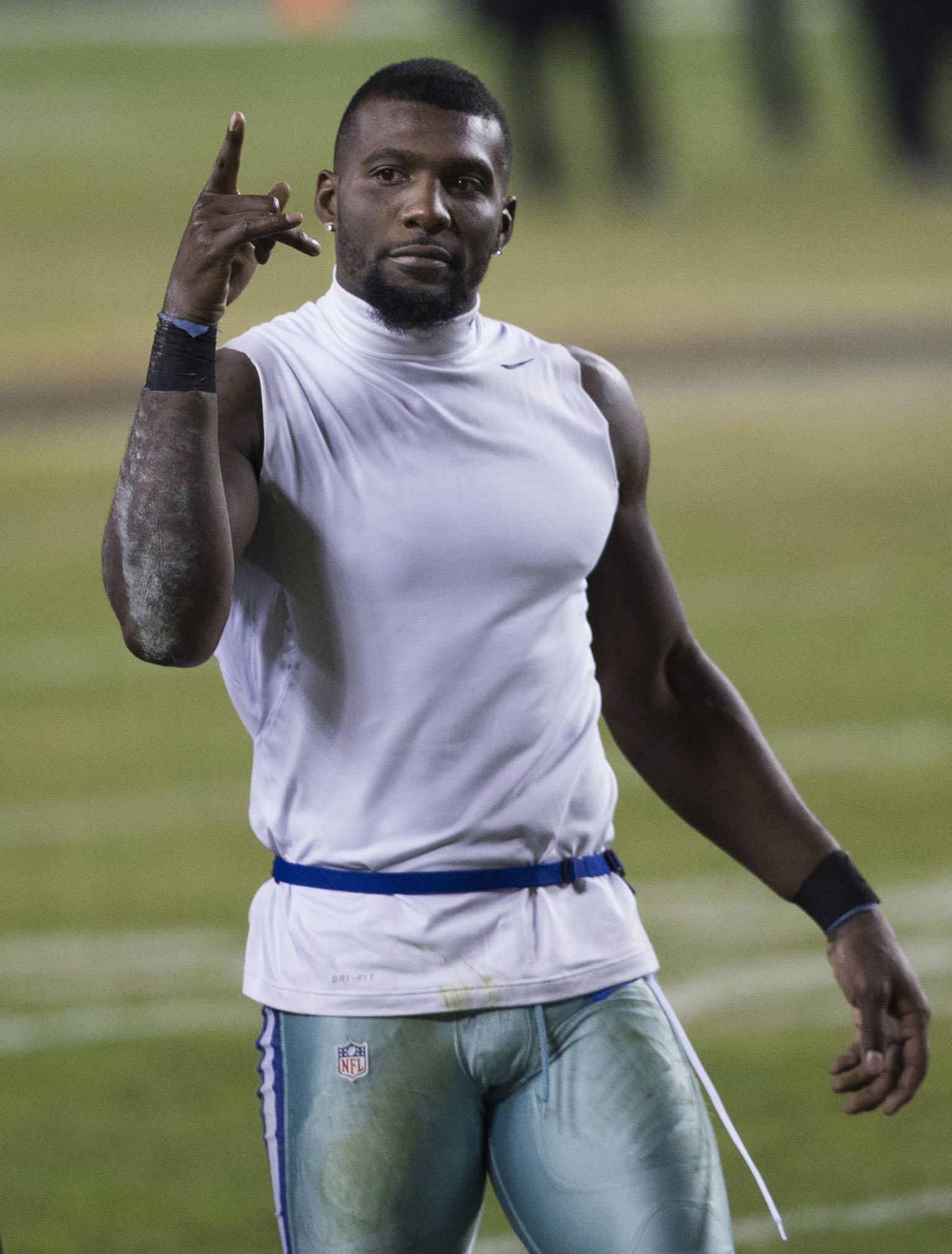
- Bryant with the Dallas Cowboys in 2015

No. 88
- Position: Wide receiver

Personal information
- Born: November 4, 1988 (age 38); Galveston, Texas, U.S.
- Listed height: 6 ft 3 in (1.91 m)
- Listed weight: 220 lb (100 kg)

Career information
- High school: Lufkin (Lufkin, Texas)
- College: Oklahoma State (2007–2009)
- NFL draft: 2010: 1st round, 24th overall pick

Career history
- Dallas Cowboys (2010–2017); New Orleans Saints (2018); Baltimore Ravens (2020)

Awards and highlights
- First-team All-Pro (2014); 3× Pro Bowl (2013, 2014, 2016); NFL receiving touchdowns leader (2014); PFWA All-Rookie Team (2010); Consensus All-American (2008); Big 12 Special Teams Player of the Year (2008); First-team All-Big 12 (2008)

Career NFL statistics
- Receptions: 537
- Receiving yards: 7,506
- Receiving touchdowns: 75
- Stats at Pro Football Reference

Desmond Demond Bryant (born November 4, 1988) is an American former professional football wide receiver who played in the National Football League (NFL) for nine seasons, primarily with the Dallas Cowboys. He played college football for the Oklahoma State Cowboys, earning consensus All-American honors as a sophomore in 2008. Bryant missed most of his junior season due to violating an NCAA bylaw.

Bryant was selected by the Dallas Cowboys in the first round of the 2010 NFL draft, where he earned three Pro Bowl berths and was named an All-Pro in 2014. After eight seasons with the Cowboys, Bryant was acquired by the New Orleans Saints in 2018, but suffered a season-ending injury two days after signing with the team. After a year away from the NFL, Bryant signed with the Baltimore Ravens in 2020, where he was primarily a backup and alternated between the practice squad and the active roster.

== Early life ==
Desmond Demond Bryant was born in Galveston, Texas at The University of Texas Medical Branch on November 4, 1988. Bryant had a troubled upbringing, born to a teenage mother, Angela, who was arrested for dealing crack cocaine when Bryant was eight years old. He went on to live in eight different homes while attending Lufkin High School. He and his family later moved to Lufkin, Texas, where he attended Lufkin High School. While attending Lufkin High School, Bryant and his family lived in eight different homes. While at Lufkin High School, Bryant played high school football for the Panthers football team. As a junior, he recorded 48 receptions for 1,025 yards and 16 touchdowns. Bryant led Lufkin to a 14–1 record, including an appearance in the 5A Division II state semifinals, where they lost 46–28 to Todd Dodge's Southlake Carroll. As a senior, Bryant had 53 receptions for 1,207 yards with 21 touchdowns, and was an All-State selection. Lufkin finished the season with an 11–1 record, after losing 38–25 to Round Rock in the area round of the playoffs. After the season, Bryant participated in the Offense-Defense All-American Bowl. He was named an All-American by Parade and SuperPrep.

Bryant competed in track and field and was one of the state's top competitors in the triple jump (top-jump of 14.17 m). As a standout hurdler, he had personal bests of 14.56 seconds in the 110-m hurdles and 40.70 seconds in the 300-m hurdles. Bryant was also a member of the 4 × 100-m (42.62) and 4 × 200-m (1:28.35) relay squads.

=== Recruiting ===
Regarded as a four-star recruit by Rivals.com, Bryant was listed as the No. 9 wide receiver prospect in the class of 2007, and the second from Texas behind only Terrence Toliver. Recruited by numerous major programs, including most Big 12 schools, Bryant took official visits to Texas A&M, Oklahoma State, and Texas Tech, before committing to the Cowboys on January 29, 2007.

== College career ==
Bryant attended Oklahoma State University from 2007 to 2009 and was a member of the Oklahoma State Cowboys football team coached by Mike Gundy.

=== 2007 season ===
On September 1, Bryant made his collegiate debut against Georgia and had a seven-yard reception in the 35–14 loss. Three weeks later against Texas Tech, Bryant had five receptions for 51 yards and his first collegiate receiving touchdown on a five-yard reception from Zac Robinson in the 49–45 victory. On October 20 against Kansas State, Bryant had three receptions for 37 yards and two touchdowns in the narrow 41–39 victory. Three weeks later against Kansas, he set a school record for receiving yards in a game by a freshman with 155 in the 43–28 loss. In the 2007 Insight Bowl, Bryant recorded nine receptions for 117 yards and two touchdowns in a 49–33 victory over the Indiana Hoosiers. As a freshman in 2007, he finished second on the team with 43 receptions for 622 yards and six touchdowns in 12 games.

=== 2008 season ===
On September 6 against Houston, Bryant recorded nine receptions for 236 yards and three touchdowns to go along with a punt return touchdown in the 56–37 victory. For his game against Houston, he was named the Walter Camp Foundation's National Offensive Player of the Week. Three weeks later against Troy, he caught six passes for 118 yards and three touchdowns in the 55–24 victory. In the next game against Texas A&M, Bryant had 106 receiving yards, three receiving touchdowns, and a punt return touchdown during the 56–28 victory. On October 18 against Baylor, he recorded 11 receptions for 212 yards and two touchdowns in the 34–6 victory. Two weeks later against Iowa State, Bryant caught nine passes for 171 yards and four touchdowns in the 59–17 victory. On November 29 against Oklahoma, he had six receptions for 91 yards and two touchdowns in the 61–41 loss. On December 30 against Oregon in the 2008 Holiday Bowl, Bryant recorded 13 receptions for 167 yards and a touchdown in the 42–31 loss. He finished the 2008 season with 87 receptions for 1,480 yards and 19 touchdowns to go along with two punt return touchdowns.

=== 2009 season ===
Bryant was ruled ineligible for the rest of the 2009 season on October 7 for violating an NCAA bylaw. He failed to fully disclose his interaction with Deion Sanders, a former NFL player, to the NCAA. Bryant was considered the best wide receiver in 2009 and a possible Heisman Trophy contender before the suspension. In three games, he finished with 17 receptions for 323 yards and four touchdowns to go along with a punt return touchdown.

== Professional career ==
=== NFL draft ===
On November 5, 2009, Bryant announced his intentions to enter the 2010 NFL draft. He was widely believed to be the best wide receiver available. If he slipped by the Denver Broncos, Bryant was projected to fall no lower than the 27th pick to the Dallas Cowboys. After dropping because of character concerns, the Cowboys traded up with the New England Patriots, moving from the 27th to the 24th position to select Bryant. Bryant was the second wide receiver selected in the draft, following Demaryius Thomas with the Broncos two picks earlier. For the move, the team sent a third-round draft choice, which was the 90th overall pick, while receiving the Patriots' fourth-round draft choice, which was the 119th overall pick.

Pre-draft measurables
Height	Weight	Arm length	Hand span	40-yard dash	10-yard split	20-yard split	20-yard shuttle	Three-cone drill	Vertical jump	Broad jump	Bench press	Wonderlic
6 ft 2 in (1.88 m)	225 lb (102 kg)	34 in (0.86 m)	9 3/4 in (0.25 m)	4.52 s	1.53 s	2.51 s	4.46 s	7.10 s	38 in (0.97 m)	11 ft 1 in (3.38 m)	14 reps	16
All values from Oklahoma State Pro Day

=== Dallas Cowboys ===
==== 2010 season ====
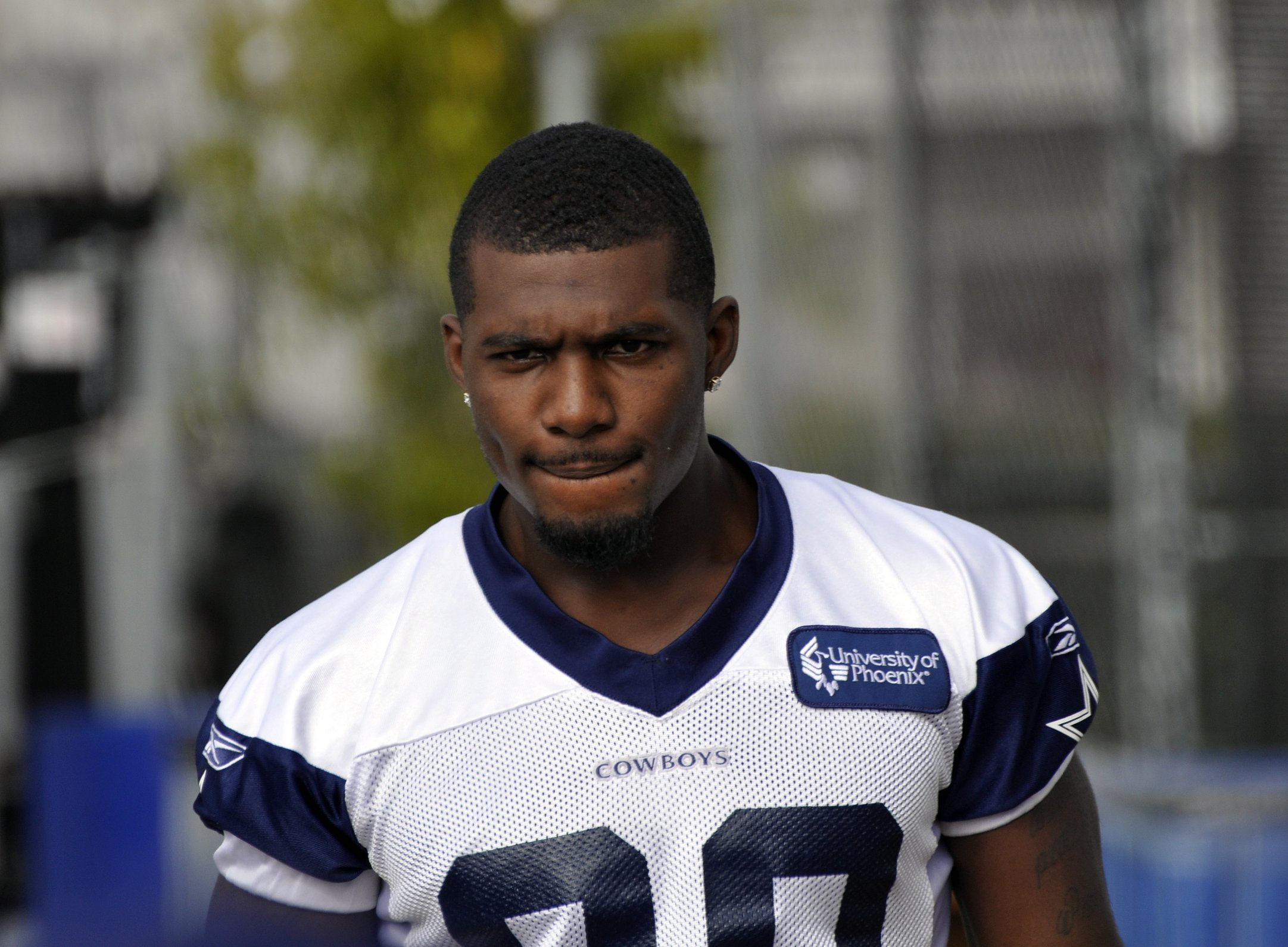
Bryant at training camp in 2010

Bryant was signed by the Cowboys to a contract very similar to that of Vikings' wide receiver Percy Harvin (five years, $12.05 million, roughly $8.4 million guaranteed) on July 22, 2010. The next day, it was announced that Bryant would wear the #88 jersey, the same as Hall of Famers and Cowboys legends Michael Irvin and Drew Pearson.

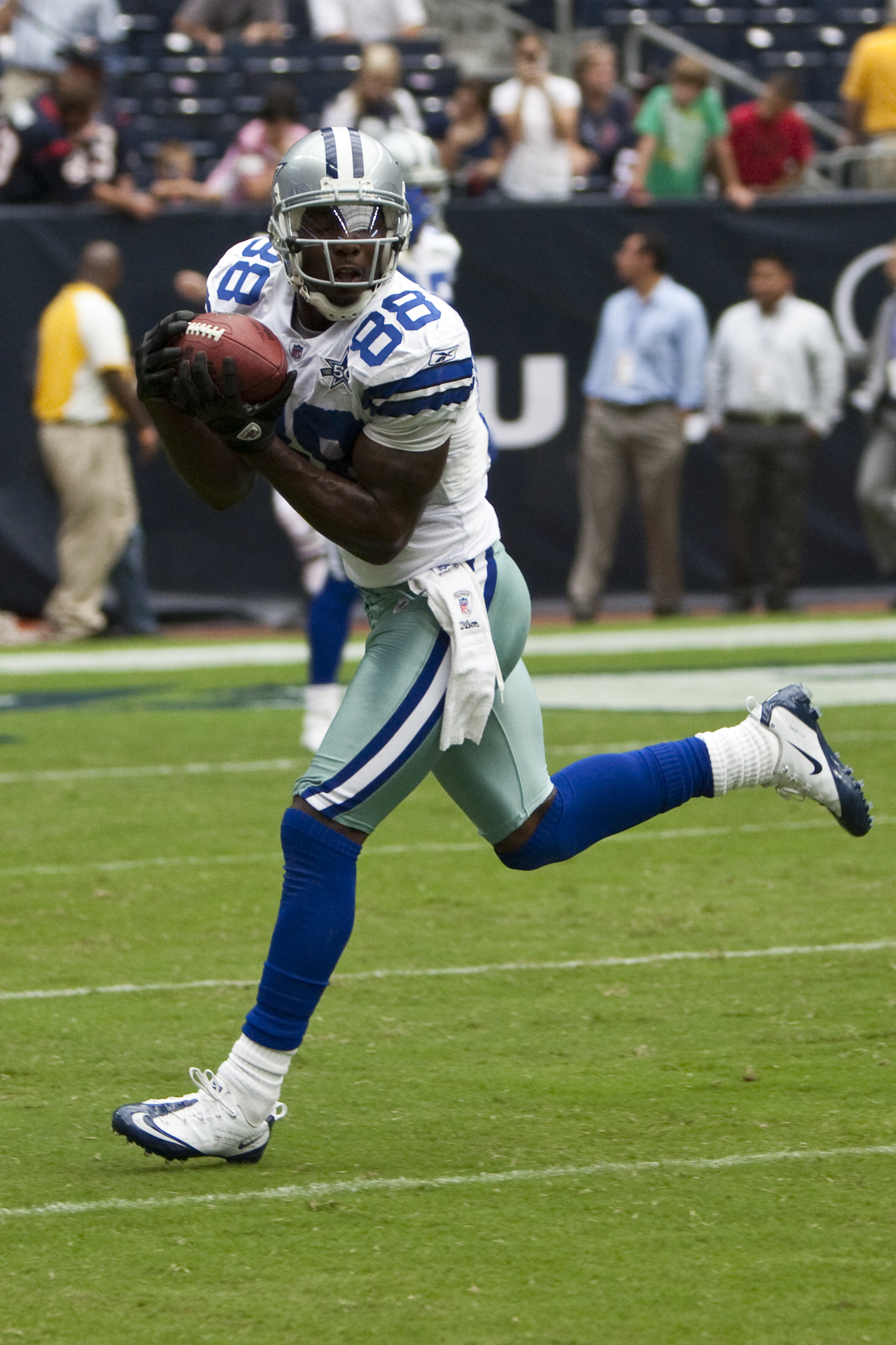
Bryant in 2010

On September 12, Bryant made his NFL debut against the Washington Redskins and had eight receptions for 56 yards. His eight receptions in his NFL debut set a franchise record for most in a player's first game. In the next game, he had a punt return touchdown during the 27–20 loss to the Chicago Bears. On October 17, Bryant caught his first NFL touchdown on a 31-yard pass from Tony Romo. The Cowboys ended up losing that game 24–21.

In a Monday Night Football game against the New York Giants, at Cowboys Stadium on October 25, 2010, Bryant caught four passes for 54 yards, two of them for touchdowns, and returned a punt 93 yards for a touchdown, making the longest Cowboys' punt return since Dennis Morgan's 98-yard return during the 1974 NFL season. With that performance, Bryant became the youngest wide receiver in franchise history to total three touchdowns in a single game, breaking Michael Irvin's mark in 1988. On November 15, Bryant caught three passes for 104 yards and one touchdown, to become the first Cowboys rookie with a 100+ yard game since Antonio Bryant in 2002.

During the fourth quarter of the Cowboys' 38–35 victory over the Indianapolis Colts, Bryant went down with a fractured ankle. Indianapolis' Kavell Conner held onto Bryant's leg while tackling him on a kickoff return, and the Cowboys immediately took Bryant to the locker room. He was placed on the injured reserve list and had surgery on the fractured ankle. He left the game with one catch for 14 yards and a 35.7-yard average on three kickoff returns.

Bryant finished his rookie year with 45 receptions for 561 yards and six touchdowns. Bryant became the first Cowboys rookie to have multiple punt returns for a touchdown in the same season since Kevin Williams in 1993. He was named to the NFL All-Rookie Team for the 2010 season.

==== 2011 season ====
With the departure of Roy Williams, Bryant won the starting job opposite Miles Austin.

Bryant finished his second professional season with 63 receptions for 928 yards and nine touchdowns, finishing second on the team in all those categories, and handled some punt return duties as the Cowboys went 8–8 and missed the postseason.

==== 2012 season ====
Bryant had four receptions for 85 yards in a 24–17 victory over the New York Giants in the season opener, which was a rare game played on a Wednesday. During a Week 4 34–18 loss to the Chicago Bears, Bryant had eight receptions for 105 yards. Following a Week 5 bye, Bryant caught his first two touchdowns of the season, while setting his career-high 13 receptions against the Baltimore Ravens. With 32 seconds remaining in the game, Bryant caught a touchdown pass from quarterback Tony Romo to bring the score to 31–29. Following a failed two-point conversion, Dallas recovered an onside kick to give the offense one last opportunity to win the game. Kicker Dan Bailey attempted a 51-yard field goal, but it sailed wide left to end the game with a Cowboys' loss. Throughout September and October, Bryant was being criticized in the media for dropping balls, fumbles and running poor routes, but he started to live up to his potential in a Week 8 game against the New York Giants, when he registered 110 yards on only five catches, and almost came up with a last-minute Hail Mary touchdown, but it was reversed because his hand was ruled out of bounds.

During Week 11 against the Cleveland Browns, Bryant had 12 catches for a then-career-high 145 yards. In the next game against the Washington Redskins, he head eight receptions for 145 receiving yards and two receiving touchdowns in the 38–31 loss. Against the New Orleans Saints in a Week 16 loss, he had the best game of his career to that point, with nine receptions for a career-high 224 yards and two touchdowns. He tied the franchise record for most consecutive games, with seven, with at least a touchdown reception, which is shared with Franklin Clarke (1961–1962), Bob Hayes (1965–1966), and Terrell Owens (2007). His 224 receiving yards were the fourth most in franchise history for a single game at the time.

Bryant finished the 2012 season with 92 receptions for 1,382 yards and 12 touchdowns; these ranked 10th, sixth, and third, respectively, among all receivers. He tied the franchise record for most consecutive games, with seven, with at least a touchdown reception, which is shared with Franklin Clarke, Bob Hayes, and Terrell Owens. Bryant also set a franchise record for most games in a single season with multiple receiving touchdowns with four, breaking a mark which was tied with Clarke, Hayes, and Owens.

Bryant suffered from several injuries throughout the second half of the season. He injured his finger in early December, opting to play through the injury for the duration of the season, saying that opponents would "have to break my leg to keep me out." Bryant left in the fourth quarter of the final game of the season against the Redskins with a back injury. Head coach Jason Garrett stated after the game that Bryant "could barely walk", with the injury. He was ranked 35th by his fellow players on the NFL Top 100 Players of 2013.

==== 2013 season ====
During Week 2, Bryant had nine receptions for 141 yards and a touchdown in a 17–16 loss to the Kansas City Chiefs. In a Week 5 51–48 shootout loss to the Denver Broncos, Bryant had six receptions for 141 yards and two touchdowns. On October 20, he had eight receptions for 110 yards in a 17–3 win over the Philadelphia Eagles. In the next game, a narrow 31–30 loss to the Detroit Lions, he had 72 receiving yards and two touchdowns. In a narrow Week 15 37–36 loss to the Green Bay Packers, Bryant finished with a season-high 11 catches for 153 receiving yards and one receiving touchdown. The Cowboys ended up going 8–8 and missed the playoffs.

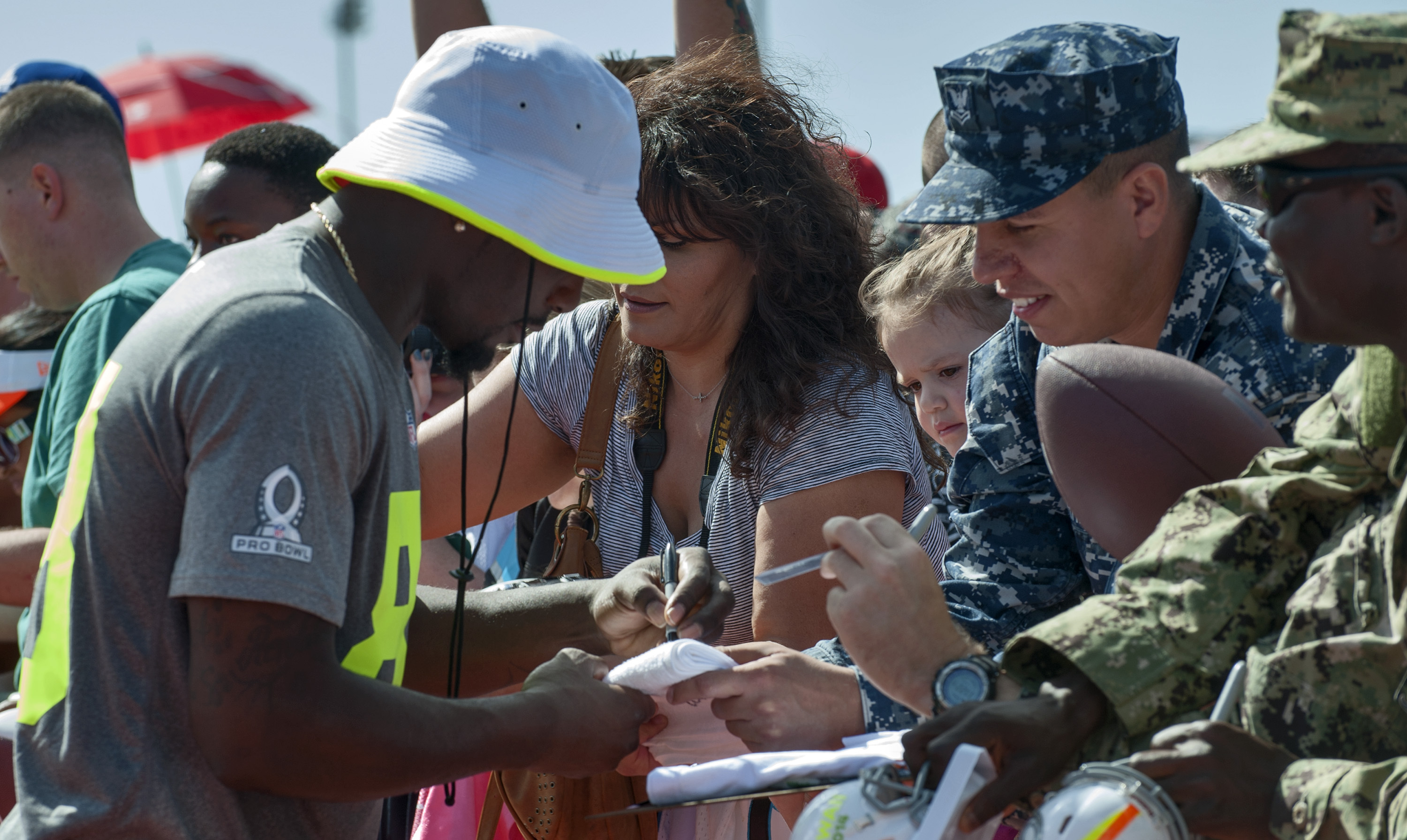
Bryant signing autographs at the 2014 Pro Bowl

Bryant started all 16 games and finished the season with 93 catches and 13 touchdowns, both career highs, and 1,233 receiving yards. These ranked eighth in catches, 13th in yards, and third in touchdowns, respectively, among all receivers. Bryant went to his first Pro Bowl. He was ranked 25th by his fellow players on the NFL Top 100 Players of 2014.

==== 2014 season ====
Entering the final year of his rookie contract, Bryant managed to improve and had the most productive year of his career. He caught 88 passes for 1,320 yards and 16 touchdowns, the latter of which led the NFL and broke Terrell Owens' franchise record of 15 touchdown receptions. As a result, he was selected for his second consecutive Pro-Bowl appearance and was chosen as first-team All-Pro.

Bryant caught five passes for 55 yards while the Cowboys were beaten at home in Week 1 by the San Francisco 49ers by a score of 28–17. However, over the next six weeks, the offense improved as they won six straight games and Bryant was dominant over the stretch, catching 41 passes for 535 yards and four touchdowns.

During Week 8 against the Washington Redskins, Tony Romo was injured and forced to miss a good portion of the game (he later returned to finish the game). As a result, the Cowboys' offense, with Brandon Weeden under center, struggled and Bryant's production decreased as a direct result. Romo missed the following week with an injured transverse process, and the Cowboys were beaten by the Arizona Cardinals by a score of 28–17. Bryant had five catches for 45 yards and two touchdowns during this stretch. Romo returned the following week against the Jacksonville Jaguars, and Bryant's production increased when he caught six passes for 158 yards and two touchdowns in the second quarter alone, making this the most productive quarter of his career. With Romo back for the remaining six games, Dallas began to dominate as Bryant compiled 32 catches for 527 yards and eight touchdowns. In a Week 12 game in that stretch, Bryant scored a late go-ahead touchdown in the fourth quarter against the New York Giants in the 31–28 victory. He was named NFC Offensive Player of the Week for Week 15. During this stretch, Dallas was 5–1 and finished with a record of 12–4, which tied for most wins in the NFL during the 2014 season. Bryant finished with 88 receptions for 1,320 yards and 16 touchdowns. It was his third consecutive season with double-digit touchdowns.

The Cowboys made the playoffs for the first time since 2009 and Bryant played in his first playoff game, against the Detroit Lions in the Wild Card Round. In a defensive struggle, Bryant saw double coverage for most of the night and was largely unproductive. However, after some second-half adjustments by the Cowboys, the Dallas offense took advantage of the added attention to Bryant and began to move the ball frequently through the air, targeting Bryant's counterparts in the receiving corps and the Cowboys won 24–20 after being down 20–7 late in the third quarter. The game was not without controversy; as the Lions were ahead on the scoreboard, 20–17, facing a third-and-1, quarterback Matthew Stafford threw a pass to tight end Brandon Pettigrew, who was seemingly interfered with by Cowboys linebacker Anthony Hitchens, and the referees threw a flag and announced a pass interference. After about a minute, the referees gathered their flags and declared no foul on the play, which resulted in a fourth-and-1. After an attempt to draw Dallas offsides, Detroit punted the ball back to the Cowboys and Dallas drove 59 yards and scored the game-winning touchdown.

In the Divisional Round, the Cowboys lost to the Green Bay Packers 26–21. The game is noted for a controversial call that reversed a complete 31-yard pass to Bryant on fourth-and-2 from the Packers' 32. Although Bryant, covered by Sam Shields, caught the ball with both feet coming down in bounds, Bryant bobbled the ball as he stretched towards the 1-yard line. Referees initially ruled Bryant down at the 1-yard line, but overturned this call as an incomplete pass following a challenge from Packers' coach Mike McCarthy. Bryant said after the game that he believed it was a catch without a doubt, and wanted to know why his catch was overturned. Dean Blandino, NFL vice president of officiating, also confirmed that the play was correctly reversed by tweeting "Bryant going to the ground. By rule he must hold onto it throughout entire process of contacting the ground. He didn't so it is incomplete." Later, during the following offseason, according to The Fort Worth Star-Telegram, Blandino met with the Cowboys stating "The message to the coaches and players – because we've gone out and visited with every staff – is if you're falling to the ground to make the catch, then you have to maintain the control when you land," Blandino said. "And if you reach or do anything with the football, that's not going to trump that requirement to maintain control." In the offseason, he was ranked 15th by his fellow players on the NFL Top 100 Players of 2015.

==== 2015 season ====
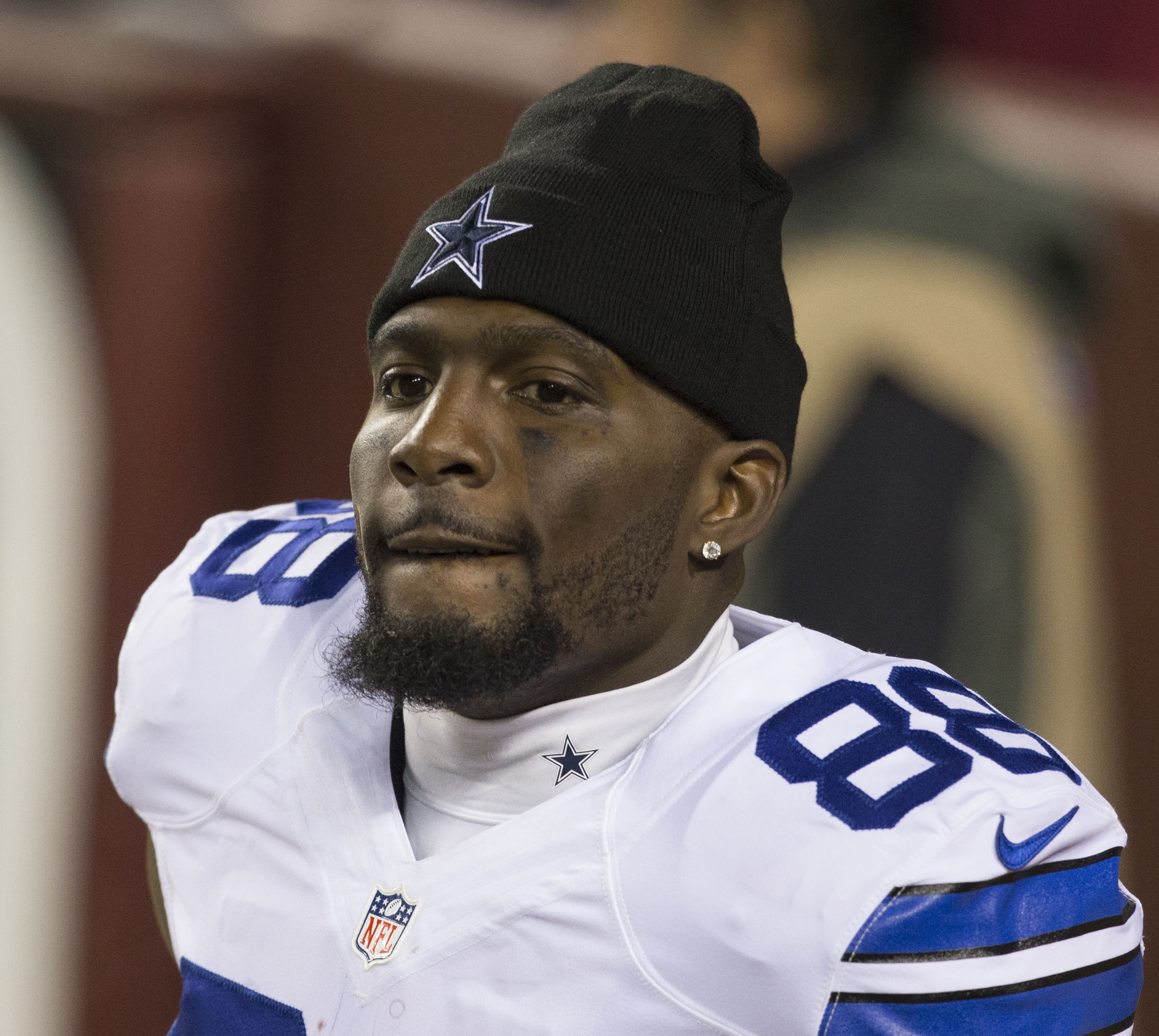
Bryant in Landover in 2015

On March 3, 2015, the Cowboys placed the nonexclusive franchise tag, worth $12.823 million, on Bryant. On July 15, Bryant and the Cowboys reached an agreement on a five-year, $70 million contract that included $45 million of guaranteed money and a $20 million signing bonus.

During Sunday Night Football against the New York Giants in the Cowboys' regular season opener, Bryant left the game with a foot injury. An x-ray revealed a fracture in the foot that required surgery. Recovery time for Bryant's injury required 4–6 weeks. He returned in Week 8 against the Seattle Seahawks and struggled, recording two receptions for 12 yards in a 13–12 loss to the Seahawks in AT&T Stadium. Week 9 against the Philadelphia Eagles, Bryant caught his first touchdown of the season on a day where he totaled five catches for 104 yards in the 33–27 loss. Limited to nine games in the 2015 season, Bryant had 31 receptions for 401 receiving yards and three touchdowns. He was ranked 51st by his fellow players on the NFL Top 100 Players of 2016. On January 6, 2016, he underwent foot and ankle surgeries.

For the season, Bryant has sold the most merchandise for a wide receiver and fifth most overall merchandise with only Tom Brady, Peyton Manning, Russell Wilson, and Aaron Rodgers selling more than Bryant.

==== 2016 season ====
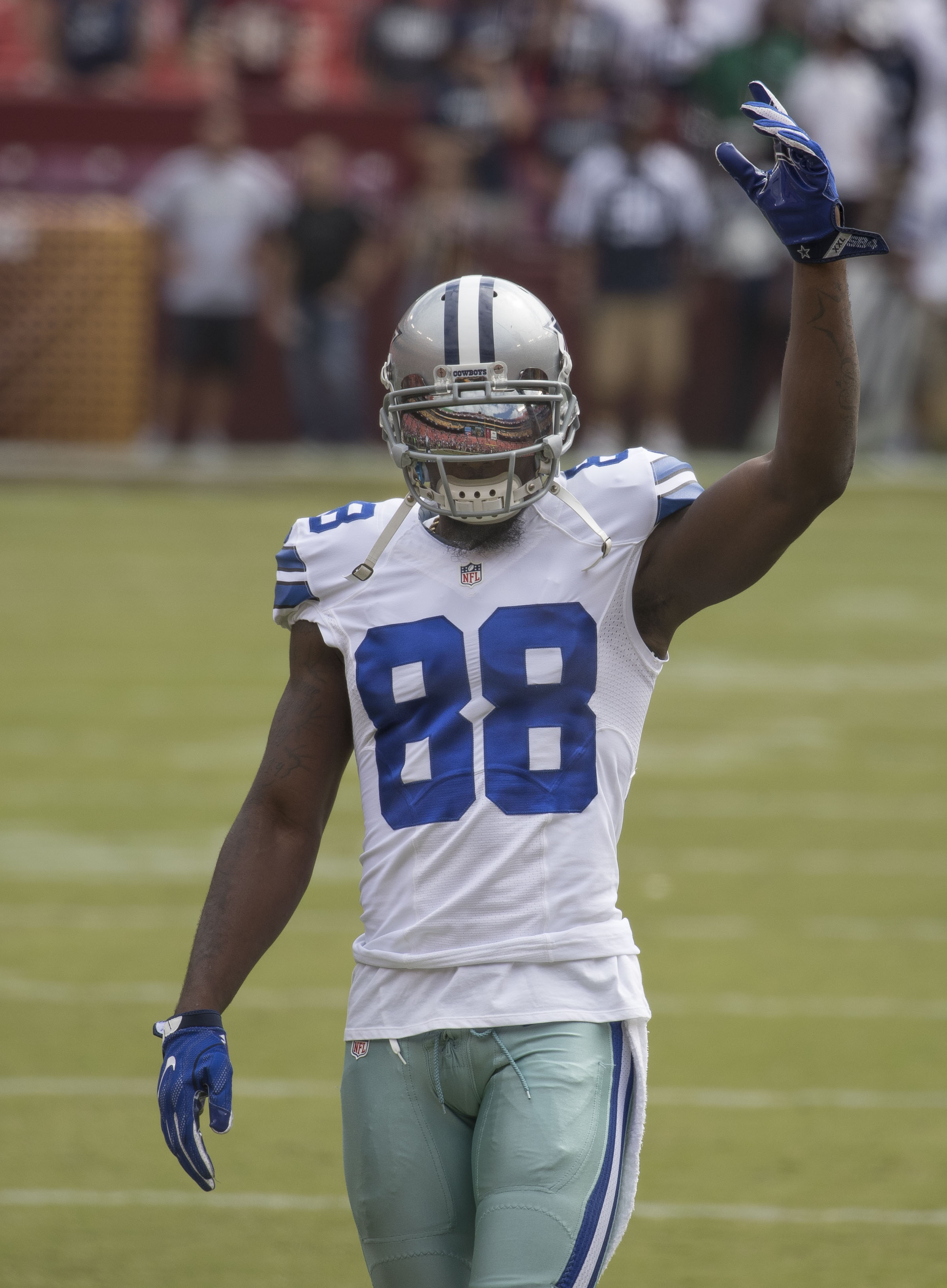
Bryant in 2016

Bryant started the 2016 season with a new starting quarterback in Dak Prescott as Tony Romo suffered a back injury in the preseason. After recording a single reception for eight yards in the season opening loss to the New York Giants, he had seven receptions for 102 yards in a Week 2 27–23 victory over the Washington Redskins. Bryant suffered a hairline fracture in his knee in Week 3 against the Chicago Bears, forcing him to miss extended time. He returned in Week 8 against the Philadelphia Eagles. Overall, he finished the season with 50 receptions for 796 yards and a team-high eight touchdowns in 13 games played.

The Cowboys finished with a 13–3 record and won the NFC East. Bryant's most productive performance of the season came in the postseason against the Green Bay Packers in the Divisional Round, where he recorded nine receptions for 132 yards and two touchdowns in a 34–31 defeat. Bryant was named to the Pro Bowl for the third time in his career, replacing Julio Jones, who could not participate due to the Atlanta Falcons advancing to Super Bowl LI. He was ranked 60th by his fellow players on the NFL Top 100 Players of 2017.

==== 2017 season ====
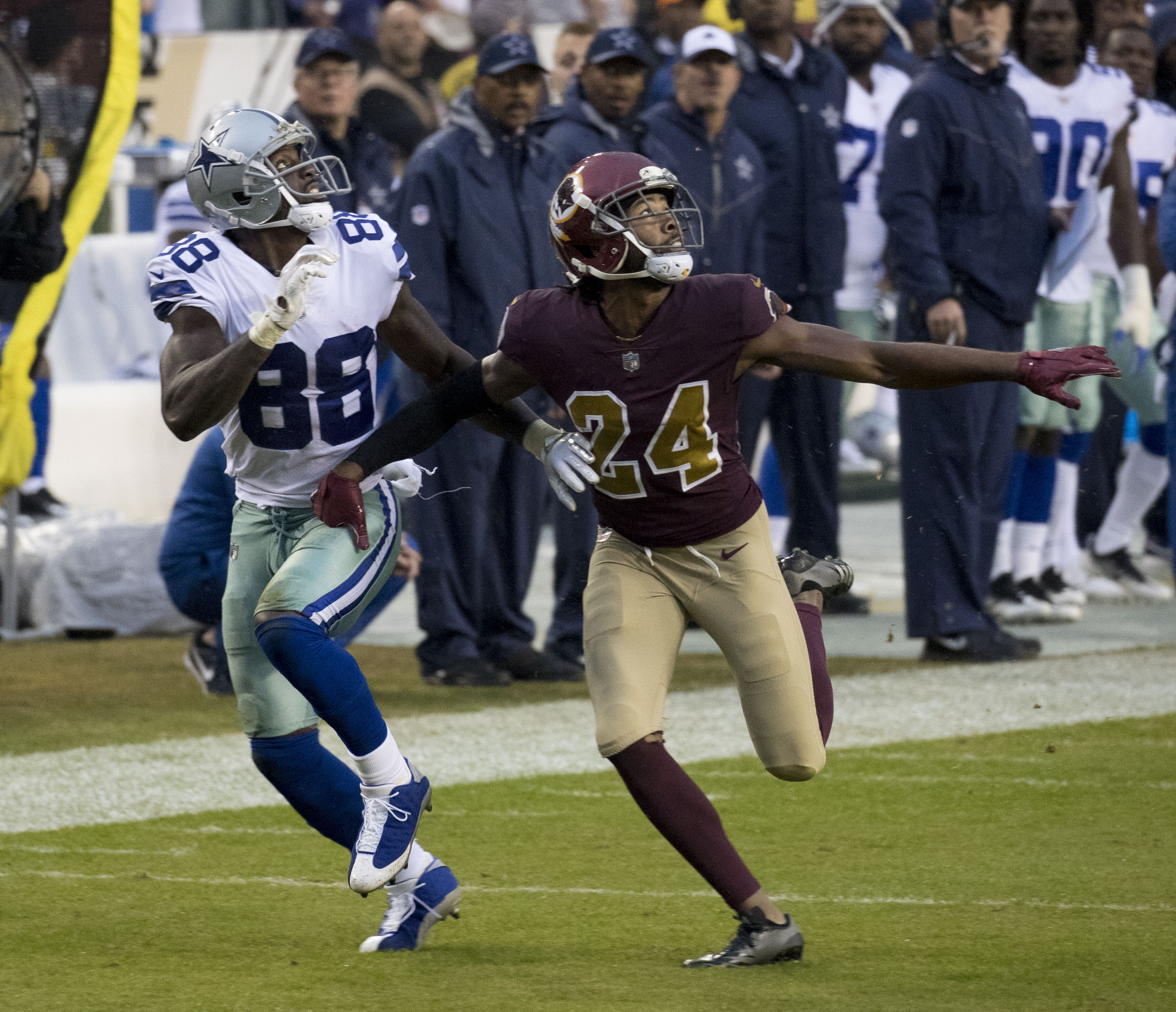
Bryant being covered by Josh Norman in a game against the Washington Redskins

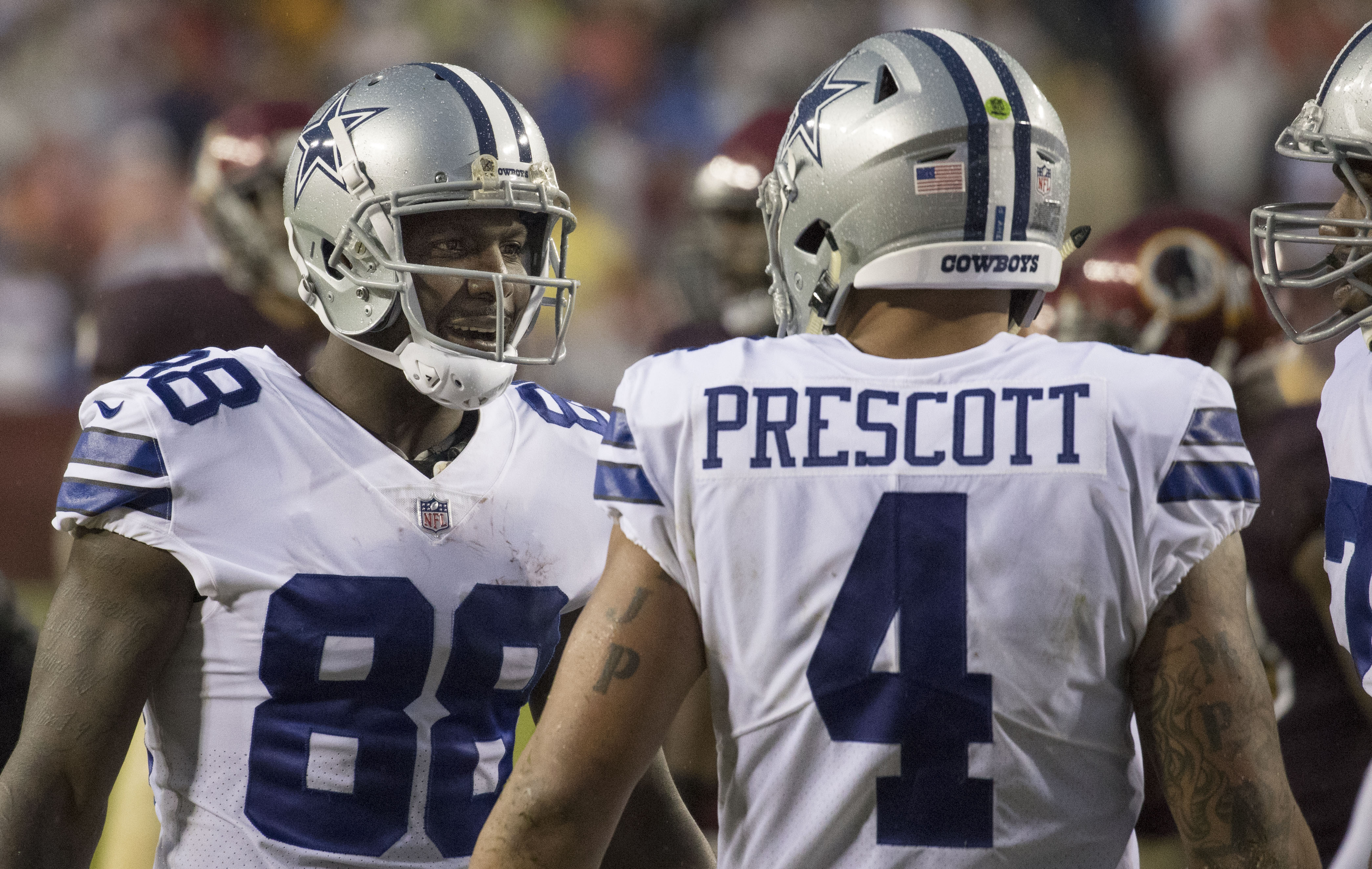
Bryant and Dak Prescott in Landover in 2017

Bryant started the 2017 season scoring a touchdown in four of the team's first six games. During a Week 9 28–17 victory over the Kansas City Chiefs, Bryant sprained his ankle, and was sidelined for the rest of the game.

On November 30, against the Washington Redskins, Bryant passed Bob Hayes for the Cowboys franchise record for receiving touchdowns. Overall, he played in all 16 games in the 2017 season and recorded 69 receptions for 838 yards and six touchdowns as the Cowboys finished with a 9–7 record and missed the playoffs.

The Cowboys released Bryant on April 13, 2018, after eight seasons with the team.

=== New Orleans Saints ===
On November 7, 2018, nine weeks into the 2018 season, Bryant agreed to a one-year, $1.25 million deal with the New Orleans Saints. Two days after signing with the Saints, Bryant tore his Achilles tendon during team practice. He was placed on injured reserve the following day, ending his season without playing a single game with the Saints.

=== 2019 ===
In October 2019, Bryant stated that he was going to rehabilitate and train during the 2019 season. Bryant said he did not plan on retiring and wanted to return to play football in 2019, but did not sign with a team.

=== Baltimore Ravens ===
On October 27, 2020, Bryant was signed to the Baltimore Ravens' practice squad. He was elevated to the active roster on November 7 and November 21 for the team's weeks 9 and 10 games against the Indianapolis Colts and Tennessee Titans, and reverted to the practice squad after each game. Against the Titans, Bryant recorded his first reception since the 2017 season for a four-yard gain. He finished the game with a season-high four receptions for 28 yards in the 30–24 overtime loss. He was promoted to the active roster on November 28. Right before the Week 13 matchup against the Dallas Cowboys, his former team, Bryant tested positive for COVID-19 and was ineligible to play. He was placed on the reserve/COVID-19 list by the team on December 10, 2020, and activated on December 15. In Week 15 against the Jacksonville Jaguars, Bryant caught an 11-yard touchdown pass, his first touchdown since 2017, spanning over 1,100 days, in the Ravens' 40–14 win. The next week, he caught an eight-yard touchdown pass in the fourth quarter of the Ravens' 27–13 win over the New York Giants. He finished the 2020 season with six receptions for 47 yards and two touchdowns.

== Career statistics ==
=== NFL ===
Legend
	Led the league
**Bold**	Career high

==== Regular season ====
Year	Team	Games		Receiving					Rushing					Returning					Fumbles	
Year	Team	GP	GS	Rec	Yds	Avg	Lng	TD	Att	Yds	Avg	Lng	TD	Ret	Yds	Avg	Lng	TD	Fum	Lost
2010	DAL	12	2	45	561	12.5	46	6	1	0	0.0	0	0	**27**	**508**	**18.8**	**93T**	**2**	1	1
2011	DAL	15	13	63	928	14.7	50T	9	1	**5**	**5.0**	**5**	0	18	158	8.8	26	0	3	1
2012	DAL	**16**	14	92	**1,382**	15.0	**85T**	12	**2**	−5	−2.5	**6**	0	12	66	5.5	44	0	**5**	**2**
2013	DAL	**16**	**16**	**93**	1,233	13.3	79	13	1	1	1.0	1	0	—	—	—	—	—	3	1
2014	DAL	**16**	**16**	88	1,320	15.0	68T	**16**	—	—	—	—	—	—	—	—	—	—	0	0
2015	DAL	9	9	31	401	12.9	51	3	—	—	—	—	—	—	—	—	—	—	0	0
2016	DAL	13	13	50	796	**15.9**	56	8	—	—	—	—	—	—	—	—	—	—	1	1
2017	DAL	**16**	**16**	69	838	12.1	50	6	1	−4	−4.0	−4	0	—	—	—	—	—	1	1
2018	NO	0	0	Did not play due to injury																
2020	BAL	6	0	6	47	7.8	16	2	—	—	—	—	—	—	—	—	—	—	0	0
Career		119	99	537	7,506	14.0	85T	75	6	−3	−0.5	6	0	57	732	12.8	93T	2	14	7

==== Postseason ====
Year	Team	Games		Receiving					Rushing					Returning					Fumbles	
Year	Team	GP	GS	Rec	Yds	Avg	Lng	TD	Att	Yds	Avg	Lng	TD	Ret	Yds	Avg	Lng	TD	Fum	Lost
2014	DAL	**2**	**2**	7	86	14.3	**43**	0	—	—	—	—	—	—	—	—	—	—	1	0
2016	DAL	1	1	**9**	**132**	**14.7**	40T	**2**	—	—	—	—	—	—	—	—	—	—	0	0
2018	NO	0	0	Did not play due to injury																
2020	BAL	2	0	—	—	—	—	—	—	—	—	—	—	—	—	—	—	—	0	0
Career		5	3	16	218	14.5	43	2	0	0.0	0	0	0	0	0.0	0	0	0	1	0

=== College ===
Season	Team	GP	Receiving				Punt returns				Kick returns			
Season	Team	GP	Rec	Yds	Avg	TD	Ret	Yds	Avg	TD	Ret	Yds	Avg	TD
2007	Oklahoma State	12	43	622	14.5	6	2	15	7.5	0	0	0	0.0	0
2008	Oklahoma State	13	**87**	**1,480**	17.0	**19**	**17**	**305**	17.9	**2**	**4**	**100**	**25.0**	0
2009	Oklahoma State	3	17	323	**19.0**	4	3	111	**37.0**	1	2	43	21.5	0
Career		28	147	2,425	16.5	29	22	431	19.6	3	6	143	23.8	0

== Career highlights ==
=== Awards and honors ===
NFL

- First-team All-Pro (2014)
- 3× Pro Bowl (2013, 2014, 2016)
- NFL receiving touchdowns leader (2014)
- PFWA All-Rookie Team (2010)
- 5× NFL Top 100 — 35th (2013), 25th (2014), 15th (2015), 51st (2016), 60th (2017)

College

- Consensus All-American (2008)
- Big 12 Special Teams Player of the Year (2008)
- First-team All-Big 12 (2008)
- Rivals second-team freshman All-America (2007)

=== Cowboys franchise records ===
- Most receiving touchdowns, career: 73
- Most games with at least two receiving touchdowns, single season: (4) (twice, in 2012 and 2014)
- Most games with at least two receiving touchdowns, career: (15) (tied with Bob Hayes)
- Consecutive games with a receiving touchdown: (7) (tied with Terrell Owens, Bob Hayes, and Frank Clarke)

== Personal life ==
Bryant has two sons, Zayne and Dez Jr.

In a tweet, Bryant endorsed Kanye West's campaign in the 2020 United States presidential election.

=== Legal issues ===
Bryant was sued in March 2011 for $861,350 for legal fees and the cost of jewelry, which he acquired on credit while a student athlete. The case was settled before court proceedings for between $400,000 and $500,000.

On July 16, 2012, Bryant was arrested on a class A misdemeanor domestic violence charge for allegedly striking his biological mother, Angela Bryant. In March 2013, Bryant spoke at an event for Dallas Men Against Abuse. At the event, he stated, "I'm done with domestic abuse."

On August 28, 2014, Bryant launched his official brand and apparel line, ThrowUpTheX.

On June 22, 2016, Bryant was sued by Texas state senator Royce West for damaging a rented house in DeSoto, Texas. Damage to the rental house totaled over $60,000.

On Sunday, October 25, 2026, Bryant was involved in a road rage incident in Southlake, Texas. Southlake Police Department released a statement dated October 26, 2026 stating Bryant was involved in a altercation where he received a citation for Assault by Contact, a Class C misdemeanor, and was released at the scene.

== See also ==
- Dez Caught It
- List of Dallas Cowboys first-round draft picks
- List of National Football League annual receiving touchdowns leaders
- List of NCAA major college football yearly scoring leaders
- List of NFL 1,000-yard receiving trios
- List of Oklahoma State Cowboys in the NFL draft
