= AFL–NFL merger =

1970 merger of two major U.S. football leagues

The AFL–NFL merger was the merger of the two major professional American football leagues in the United States at the time: the National Football League (NFL) and the American Football League (AFL). It paved the way for the combined league, which retained the "National Football League" name and logo, to become the most popular sports league in the United States. The merger was announced on the evening of June 8, 1966.

Under the merger agreement, the leagues maintained separate regular-season schedules for the next four seasons—from 1966 through 1969 with a final championship game which would become known as the Super Bowl—and then officially merged before the 1970 season to form one league with two conferences.

== Background ==
=== Early rivals ===
Following its inception in 1920, the NFL fended off several rival leagues. Before 1960, its most important rival was the All-America Football Conference (AAFC), which began play in 1946. The AAFC differed from the NFL in several ways. Despite relatively strong backing at the league's inception, it ultimately proved an unsustainable venture. The AAFC's most serious weakness resulted from its refusal to implement an initial draft; this caused a massive lack of competitive balance, and resulted in the league's strongest team (the Cleveland Browns) dominating the league and becoming perennial champions.

Due to the AAFC's poor financial situation, the league disbanded after the 1949 season. Three AAFC teams—the Cleveland Browns, the San Francisco 49ers, and the original version of the Baltimore Colts—were absorbed into the NFL in 1950. The league was briefly known as the National-American Football League during the offseason, but reverted to the traditional name of "National Football League" by the time the 1950 season began. The Browns went on to shock NFL loyalists by dominating the older league and winning the championship in their first NFL season, thus proving themselves to be among the best professional football teams of that time.

=== Emergence of the AFL ===
After the NFL absorbed the AAFC in 1950, it had no other rival US leagues throughout the 1950s. The only other professional gridiron football leagues then in operation were the Canadian leagues that would merge to form the present day Canadian Football League in 1958.

In 1959, Lamar Hunt, son of Texas oil magnate H. L. Hunt, attempted to either gain ownership of the Chicago Cardinals with Bud Adams and move them to Dallas, or own an NFL expansion franchise in Dallas. The league, however, was not interested in expansion at the time. Rebuffed in his attempts to gain at least part-ownership in an NFL team, Hunt conceived the idea of a rival professional football league, the American Football League. In September 1959, Hunt was approached by the NFL about an expansion team in Dallas, but by then Hunt was interested only in the AFL.

The new league had six franchises by August 1959 and eight by the time of its first opening day in 1960: Boston Patriots, Buffalo Bills, Titans of New York, Houston Oilers, Denver Broncos, Dallas Texans, Oakland Raiders, and Los Angeles Chargers. While the Los Angeles, New York, Oakland, and Dallas teams shared media markets with NFL teams (the Rams, Giants, 49ers, and the expansion Dallas Cowboys, respectively), the other four teams (Boston, Buffalo, Denver, and Houston) widened the nation's exposure to professional football by serving markets that had no NFL team. In the following years, this additional exposure was widened via the relocation of two of the original eight franchises (the Chargers to San Diego in 1961 and the Texans to Kansas City in 1963), and the addition of two expansion franchises (the Miami Dolphins and Cincinnati Bengals).

From small colleges and predominantly black colleges (a source mainly ignored by the NFL), the AFL signed stars such as Bluffton flanker Elbert Dubenion, New Mexico Highlands wide receiver Lionel Taylor, McNeese State defensive tackle Tom Sestak, Northwestern State fullback Charlie Tolar and wide receiver Charlie Hennigan, North Texas State halfback Abner Haynes, and a host of others. From major colleges, it signed talented players like LSU halfback and Heisman Trophy winner Billy Cannon, Arkansas wide receiver Lance Alworth, Notre Dame quarterback Daryle Lamonica, Minnesota linebacker Bobby Bell, Kansas quarterback John Hadl, Alabama quarterback Joe Namath, and many more. The AFL also signed players the NFL had given up on: so-called "NFL rejects" who turned out to be superstars that the NFL had mis-evaluated. These included Grambling defensive tackle Buck Buchanan, Occidental quarterback Jack Kemp, Kentucky quarterbacks George Blanda and Babe Parilli, Nebraska defensive end Ron McDole, San Jose State wide receiver Art Powell, Texas A&M linebacker John Tracey, Texas Western wide receiver Don Maynard, Purdue quarterback Len Dawson, among others.

The AFL introduced many policies and rules to professional football which the NFL later adopted, including:

- A 14-game regular season schedule, which the NFL adopted in 1961 (increased from 12 games), exactly one year after the AFL's inaugural season.
- Players' last names on the jersey back.
- A slightly narrower and longer ball, the Spalding J5V, which was easier to throw than the NFL ball, "The Duke" from Wilson.
- The introduction of the two-point conversion to pro football, conforming to the college rule adopted in the 1958 college football season.
- Official time on the scoreboard clock, as opposed to it being kept by on-field officials.
- One network television broadcast package for league games, first with ABC from 1960 through 1964, then with NBC.
- The sharing of gate and television revenues by home and visiting teams.

=== Competition between the two leagues ===
At first, the NFL ignored the AFL and its eight teams, assuming the AFL would consist of players who could not earn a contract in the NFL. The NFL also had the media advantage: for example, in the 1960s, Sports Illustrated's lead football writer was Tex Maule, who previously worked with NFL commissioner Pete Rozelle when Rozelle was the general manager of the L.A. Rams and Maule was the team's public relations director; Maule "was certainly an NFL loyalist", and several sports reporters took his deprecatory columns about the AFL as fact. Another example was Dallas Cowboys general manager Tex Schramm, a close friend of Rozelle (Schramm hired Rozelle as Rams' GM), who was influential in NFL coverage by its national TV partner, CBS, including the network's employment of former NFL players as game announcers and the absence of AFL scores and reports on the network.

The AFL enjoyed one critical advantage over its established rival, which was that its owners on average were wealthier than their NFL counterparts. With a few exceptions, Hunt had successfully recruited owners who not only had deep pockets, but more importantly, the patience and willingness to absorb the inevitable financial losses of the fledgling league's early years. Therefore, in spite of the bad press, and unlike the NFL's previous rivals, the AFL was able to survive and grow, and began to prosper in the mid-1960s after the relocation of the Chargers and Texans to non-NFL markets, the sale and rebranding of the Titans of New York (to the Jets), and the Jets' signing of University of Alabama quarterback Joe Namath to an unprecedented $427,000 contract. The league's financial survival was further buoyed by NBC's $36 million, five-year contract to televise AFL games beginning in 1965.

As the commercial rivalry between the leagues intensified, both leagues entered into a bidding war over the top college prospects, paying unprecedented amounts of money for the best players coming out of college. The bidding wars escalated in the mid-1960s, with the respective drafts held on the same day in the late fall.

By contrast, many NFL owners had comparatively little wealth outside the value of their respective franchises. The NFL consistently outdrew the AFL at the gate, especially in the AFL's first few seasons, thus ensuring that the older league's franchises remained considerably more lucrative enterprises compared to their AFL rivals. Nevertheless, NFL owners knew they did not have unlimited resources to wage a protracted bidding war with the AFL.

Moreover, owners in both leagues feared that the reserve clause written into the standard players' contracts of both leagues would not survive a legal challenge. These fears ultimately proved well-founded in retrospect, as after the merger in football was finalized, the World Hockey Association would successfully challenge the National Hockey League's similar reserve clause in court.

National Football League teams had long adhered to the practice of drafting for and retaining the NFL rights to players who signed with other leagues. This policy ensured, for example, that if a Canadian Football League player developed into a star, only one particular NFL team would have the right to sign him. This ensured that NFL teams did not become embroiled in costly bidding wars for top free agents. Once the American Football League commenced operations, NFL teams extended this policy to cover AFL players as well, and the AFL promptly reciprocated the arrangement. This arrangement soon evolved into a gentlemen's agreement between the two U.S. leagues that extended even beyond the arrangement the NFL observed with respect to the CFL — specifically, once a player signed with a U.S. professional team, be it from the AFL or NFL, teams in both U.S. leagues were expected to honor each other's player contracts in their entirety (including the respective reserve clauses) and not sign players who were "under contract" with teams in the rival league.

This unwritten agreement was broken in May 1966, when the NFL's New York Giants signed placekicker Pete Gogolak, who had played out his option in 1965 with the AFL's Buffalo Bills. The NFL's contravention of the gentlemen's agreement resulted in retaliation by the AFL: Oakland Raiders co-owner Al Davis took over as AFL Commissioner in April 1966, and he stepped up the bidding war after the Gogolak transfer, signing notable NFL players, including John Brodie, Mike Ditka, and Roman Gabriel to contracts with AFL teams. Both leagues spent a combined $7 million signing their 1966 draft picks.

== The merger agreement ==
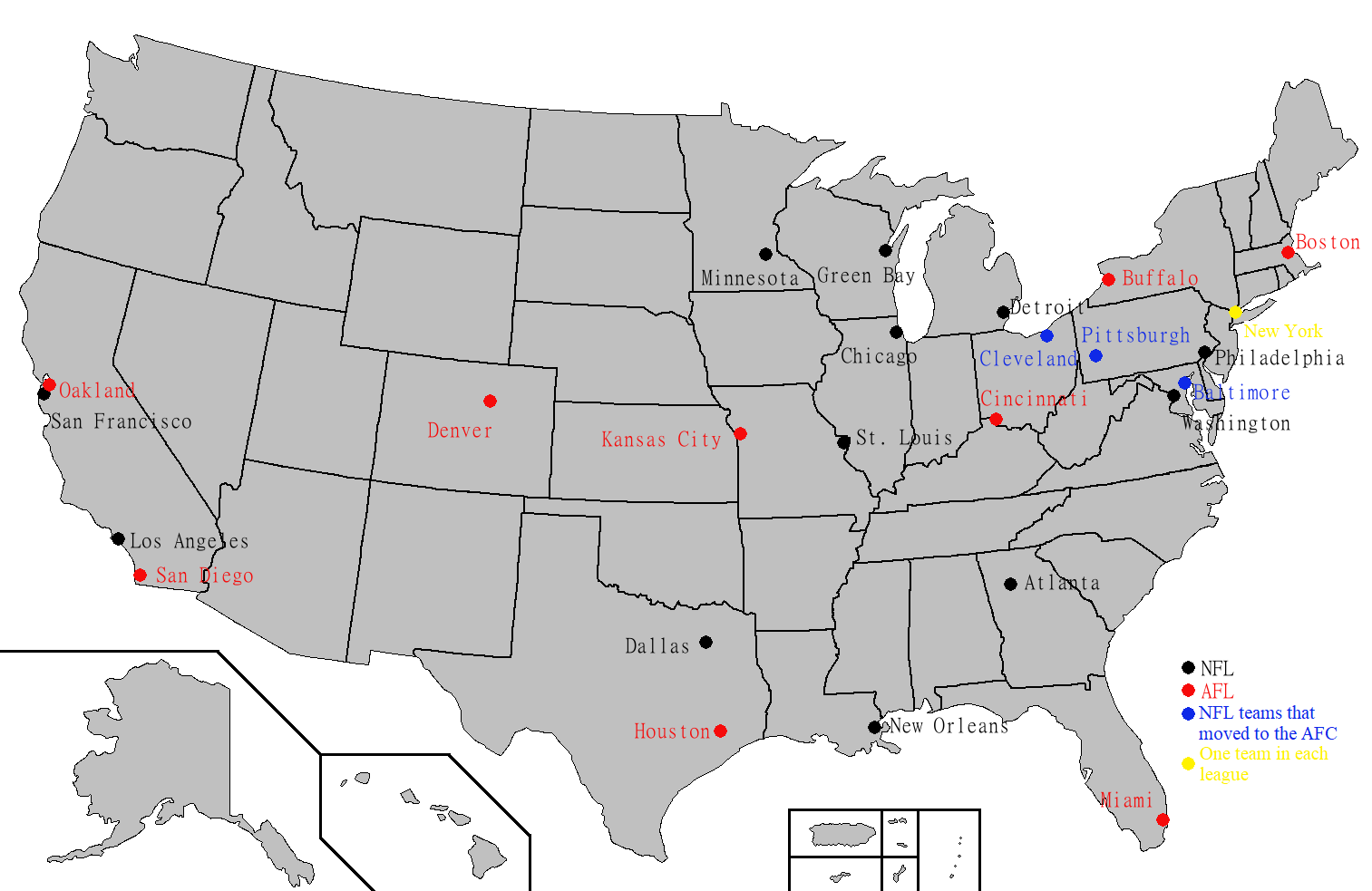
AFL and NFL teams at the time of the 1970 merger. Following the merger, all ten former AFL teams as well as Pittsburgh, Cleveland, and Baltimore from the pre-merger NFL joined the AFC. All thirteen remaining NFL teams joined the NFC.

The NFL initiated discussions for a merger between the two leagues through a backchannel: Tex Schramm, the general manager of the NFL's Dallas Cowboys since 1960, secretly contacted AFL owners, led by Lamar Hunt of Kansas City, and asked if they were interested in a merger. The talks were conducted without the knowledge of Davis, the new AFL commissioner. On the evening of June 8, 1966, the collaborators announced a merger agreement in New York. Under the agreement:

- The two leagues would combine to form an expanded league with 24 teams, to be increased to 26 teams by 1969, and to 28 by 1970, or soon thereafter. In any case, the Atlanta Falcons and the Miami Dolphins were already established and set to start play for the 1966 season, before the merger was announced in June. The leagues would add the New Orleans Saints in 1967 and the Cincinnati Bengals in 1968 prior to the merger.
- All existing franchises would be retained, and none would be moved outside of their metropolitan areas. The agreement also stipulated that no new franchises were to be placed by either league within the media markets of the other.
- The Oakland Raiders and New York Jets would pay indemnities to the San Francisco 49ers and New York Giants, respectively.
- Both leagues would hold a "common draft" of college players, effectively ending the bidding war between the two leagues over the top college prospects, with the first such draft occurring in mid-March 1967.
- The leagues would maintain separate regular season schedules through 1969. However, interleague preseason play would commence in 1967.
- The leagues agreed to play an annual AFL–NFL World Championship Game, matching the champions of each league, beginning in January 1967; the game that would eventually become known as the Super Bowl. Unlike the championship games of the leagues, which were always hosted by one of the participating teams, the interleague championship game would be held at a predetermined location.
- The two leagues would officially merge in 1970 to form one league with two conferences. The merged league would be known as the National Football League. The leagues agreed to adopt unified rules by 1970 at the latest. The leagues also agreed to not unilaterally adopt new rules that deviated from the established rules of professional American football in the interim, although the AFL was permitted to retain pre-existing rule variations such as the two point conversion for the remainder of its existence.
- The history and records of the AFL would be incorporated into the older league. In essence, for all relevant purposes the AFL franchises were to be regarded by the NFL as if they had joined the older league in whatever season they commenced play in the AFL.
- The AFL would abolish the office of AFL Commissioner immediately and recognize the NFL Commissioner as the overall chief executive of professional football. This arrangement, which was in keeping with a provision of the NFL's Constitution dating from 1941 (when the title of Commissioner was introduced in football) that sought to invest the NFL's chief executive with a similar level of authority to that exercised by the Commissioner of Baseball, formally ended the AFL's six-year run as an independent league.
- NFL Films would start recording game footage for the AFL starting in 1968 under a newly established "AFL Films" division. The two season wait was agreed at the insistence of NFL Films founder Ed Sabol, who contended that he needed adequate time to hire and train additional personnel. Thus, in practice the "AFL Films" crews were simply regular NFL Films crews, although they were issued distinct jackets for AFL contests.

Following the agreement, American Football League owners created the office of AFL President with a mandate to administer the league's day-to-day business in a semi-autonomous manner, much like the way the constituent leagues of Major League Baseball operated at the time. The owners had hoped Davis would continue to serve in that role, but Davis flatly refused to consider serving as a subordinate to Pete Rozelle. After Davis resigned as AFL Commissioner on July 25, 1966, Milt Woodard (who was assistant commissioner under the original commissioner Joe Foss and Davis) was appointed to serve as President of the AFL.

Although Pete Rozelle had not initiated the merger negotiations, he quickly endorsed the agreement. In addition to remaining in his post as NFL Commissioner, Rozelle was duly appointed chief executive of the AFL the day after Davis' resignation, and would hold the post through to the completion of the merger. In practice, the media often simply referred to Rozelle as the football commissioner or commissioner of football during the four years following the merger agreement. The pre-existing office of NFL President continued effectively unchanged following the agreement. Then occupied by Cleveland Browns owner Art Modell, the NFL presidency was (both before and after the merger agreement) essentially an honorary title. In practice, Rozelle generally respected Woodard's mandate. The most notorious example of Rozelle directly intervening in AFL affairs came prior to the 1969 season when he forced Super Bowl III-winning quarterback Joe Namath to divest his stake in a New York nightclub with alleged ties to gambling and organized crime.

Many of the conditions of the merger were designed to ensure passage of a law by the 89th U.S. Congress, exempting the merged league from antitrust sanctions. When NFL Commissioner Rozelle and other professional football executives appeared before the Congress' Subcommittee on Antitrust, chaired by New York Representative Emanuel Celler, three points were repeatedly made:

- Rozelle promised that if the merger was allowed, no existing professional football franchise of either league would be moved from any city as a result.
- The combined league would eventually expand to 28 teams as stipulated in the merger agreement.
- Stadiums seating less than 50,000 were declared to be inadequate for professional football's needs, thus compelling teams in stadiums with capacities under that number to expand their current stadiums or move to newer, larger homes.

In October, Congress passed the new law to permit the merger to proceed.

As 1970 approached, three NFL teams (the Baltimore Colts, Cleveland Browns, and Pittsburgh Steelers), agreed to join the ten AFL teams to form the American Football Conference (AFC). The other thirteen NFL teams (Atlanta Falcons (ATL), Chicago Bears (CHI), Dallas Cowboys (DAL), Detroit Lions (DET), Green Bay Packers (GB), Los Angeles Rams (LA), Minnesota Vikings (MIN), New Orleans Saints (NO), New York Giants (NYG), Philadelphia Eagles (PHI), St. Louis Cardinals (STL), San Francisco 49ers (SF), and Washington Redskins (WAS)) became part of the National Football Conference (NFC).

With the creation of the new conferences of equal size, it was deemed necessary that they each be aligned into three divisions of four or five teams each. Although the AFC teams quickly decided on a divisional alignment along mostly geographic lines, the 13 NFC owners had trouble deciding which teams would play in which divisions. The 49ers and Rams, both in California, were guaranteed to be in the same division as the only NFC teams west of the Rocky Mountains. One early proposal would have put the two California teams together with the three Northeast teams—the New York Giants, Philadelphia Eagles and Washington Redskins—reminiscent of the Western Conference's Coastal Division which had put L.A. and S.F. together with Baltimore and Atlanta from 1967 to 1969. The final five proposals were as follows:

| Plan | East | Central | West |
|---|---|---|---|
| 1 | NYG, PHI, WAS, ATL, MIN | CHI, GB, DET, NO | LA, SF, DAL, STL |
| 2 | NYG, PHI, WAS, MIN | ATL, DAL, NO, STL | LA, SF, CHI, GB, DET |
| 3 | NYG, PHI, WAS, DAL, STL | CHI, GB, DET, MIN | LA, SF, ATL, NO |
| 4 | NYG, PHI, WAS, STL, MIN | CHI, GB, DET, ATL | LA, SF, DAL, NO |
| 5 | NYG, PHI, WAS, DET, MIN | CHI, GB, DAL, STL | LA, SF, ATL, NO |

These five combinations were written up on slips of paper, sealed into envelopes and put into a fish bowl (other sources say a flower vase), and the official NFC alignment—Plan 3—was pulled out by Rozelle's secretary, Thelma Elkjer. Of the five plans considered, the one that was put into effect was the only one which had Minnesota remaining in the Central Division and Dallas playing in the Eastern Division.

Meanwhile, all three of the major television networks signed contracts to televise games, ensuring the combined league's stability. CBS agreed to broadcast all games where an NFC team was on the road, NBC agreed to broadcast all games where an AFC team was on the road, and ABC agreed to broadcast Monday Night Football, making the NFL the first league to have a regular series of national telecasts in prime time.

Since 1970, the Super Bowl has featured the champions of the AFC and NFC. Both are determined each season by the league's playoff tournament. The 1970 playoff format combined elements of both leagues' playoff formats. Four teams would qualify for the postseason from each conference (same as in 1969), thus only the "Best Second Place Team" (as it was originally called) would reach the postseason. Fans and media quickly dubbed this team the "wild card" and the NFL soon made that name official.

== Aftermath ==
Many observers believe that the NFL got the better end of the bargain, as Oakland Raiders owner Al Davis and New York Jets owner Sonny Werblin resisted the indemnity payments.

Long-time sports writer Jerry Magee of the San Diego Union-Tribune wrote: "Al Davis taking over as commissioner was the strongest thing the AFL ever did. He thought the AFL–NFL merger was a detriment to the AFL." However, other observers consider those scenarios far-fetched: the NFL had a richer television contract at the time of the merger, in large part because of market exclusivity in such leading population centers as Los Angeles, Chicago, Detroit, Philadelphia, Washington, Baltimore, Atlanta and the Dallas–Fort Worth area, which were rapidly increasing in population and would emerge as media strongholds in the 1970s.

Despite AFL triumphs in Super Bowls III and IV, the old-guard NFL was still widely expected to dominate the merged league over the course of an entire season. In 1970, these predictions were proven to be more or less correct: out of 60 regular season games pitting old-line NFL teams versus former AFL teams, former AFL teams went 19–39 (two games, Buffalo at Baltimore in week 9 and St. Louis at Kansas City in week 10, ended in ties). Only Oakland managed to post a winning record against old-line NFL opposition, going 3–2 (defeating Washington, Pittsburgh and Cleveland; losing to Detroit and San Francisco) before losing to the Colts in the AFC championship. Nevertheless, out of the three NFL teams to join the AFC, only the Colts managed to secure a playoff berth.

Each of the first 29 games on the new Monday Night Football featured at least one team from the old-guard NFL, with the first nationally televised prime time game between two former AFL teams being Oakland at Houston on October 9, 1972.

The merger paved the way for a new era of prosperity for the NFL. While a number of rival professional football leagues have commenced play since 1970 including the XFL, WFL, USFL, UFL, and AAF alongside revivals of the XFL and USFL that later merged together into a new UFL, and while the CFL once experimented with U.S.-based teams, none of these ventures came close to being a serious challenge to the NFL.

Pursuant to the agreement, the Tampa Bay Buccaneers joined the AFC in 1976, and the Seattle Seahawks joined the NFC. The 1976 expansion teams switched conferences before their second season in the league, becoming the first NFL teams to change conferences after the merger.

In spite of Rozelle's promise that there would be no re-locations involving teams in existence at the time of the merger, by the end of his tenure as commissioner in 1989 three franchises had moved to a different market from where they were based in 1970.

== See also ==
- ABA–NBA merger
- NHL–WHA merger, also referred to as the 1979 NHL expansion by the NHL.
