= AFL and NFL era competitive college drafts =

Era of American football drafts from 1960 to 1966

During the first seven years of existence (1960–1966) of the American Football League (AFL, 1960–1969), the AFL and the NFL held separate, competing drafts for college football talent.

Because of the competition between the leagues, unlike today's drafts, they were held soon after the end of the football season in each league, often before the college bowls were over. Many players, such as LSU's Billy Cannon signed pro contracts "under the goalposts" at bowl games; and in the College East-West Game and other all-star college bowls, many players wore the helmets of the professional team that they had signed with.

The AFL was at a disadvantage in name-recognition with the established NFL, but during this period, its franchises signed a significant number of stars away from the older league. These included Cannon, as well as eventual Hall of Famers Lance Alworth, Buck Buchanan, Jim Otto, Billy Shaw, and Nick Buoniconti, and such standouts as Matt Snell, Tom Sestak, Charley Hennigan, Abner Haynes, Johnny Robinson and many others.

The annual battle for draftees would be one of the primary issues that led to the AFL becoming the AFC and merging into the NFL. Before the merger could be completed, in 1967, the leagues would begin operating a common draft.

== Draft structure and the 1960 AFL draft ==
For most of this period of competing drafts, the two leagues used structures very similar to the draft system employed by the current NFL, with the team with the worst record from the previous year selecting first, and the reigning league champion selected last.

But for the AFL's first draft for the 1960 season, the upstart league employed "territory" selections and drafted players by position. The draft was held in November and December 1959 and had 33 rounds. Each AFL team had "territorial rights" to players from its general region for a "bonus" draft selection, so that teams could sign players who were known to their fans. These were not "picked" as such, but agreed on by consensus. The 1960 AFL draft proceeded with teams selecting by lot and player position, e.g., each team selected quarterbacks from the available list, then running backs, etc. These were not listed in order of selection, but alphabetically in two groups called "First Selections" and "Second Selections" by each team. Minneapolis-Saint Paul was originally included in the AFL draft on November 22, 1959. When the Minneapolis-Saint Paul owners reneged on their agreement to join the AFL and jumped to the NFL, some of the remaining AFL teams signed several players from the deserters' draft list. To compensate for this, after the Oakland Raiders' AFL franchise was granted, an allocation draft was held, to permit the Raiders to stock their team with players from the other seven AFL teams.

== Competing for players ==
Draft pick evaluation while competing with another league created a whole layer of incentives that do not exist in the modern NFL draft. If a player was selected and signed with a team in the other league, a team would not want to pick that player and risk not being able to sign them. A player who was selected and highly desired by two teams in the two different leagues, could then force a bidding war earning a higher salary. Thus "signability" was a key metric in evaluating prospective players.

This disparity would result in parallel drafts where the pick orders could have huge variance across the two leagues. For example, in the 1963 draft, Heisman Trophy winning quarterback Terry Baker was selected first overall in the NFL, but only picked in the 12th round by the AFL.
