= Common draft =

American football draft (1967–1969)

The common draft was the selection of college football players in a combined draft from 1967 to 1969 by the American Football League (AFL) and the National Football League (NFL). This took place after the AFL-NFL merger agreement in 1966.

From 1960 to 1966, the AFL and NFL drafts were separate and each league competed for players, a major factor in their merger. During the three years of the common draft, teams from both leagues were combined in a single ranking to determine the order of the draft. The team with the worst record in either league the previous year picked first, the next-worst team second, and so on, with the exception that the loser of the previous year's World Championship Game picked second to last, and the reigning world champion picked last. As is the case today, any team's draft order could be affected by trades. When the two leagues formally merged for the 1970 season, the "common draft" became the modern NFL draft.

== Additional reading ==
- The Making of the Super Bowl : The Inside Story of the World's Greatest Sporting Event by Don Weiss, p. 24
