= American Football League draft =

The American Football League draft, the American Football League (AFL, 1960–1969) stocked its teams in two ways:

1. Signing free agents (players whose contracts in other professional football leagues had expired, or who had no professional experience).
2. Signing players from the previous year's college graduates.

The latter option involved a "draft" in which each team selected players who then were not available for other teams to select. The draft for the 1960 season was actually conducted in late 1959, shortly after the formation of the league. Thereafter, American Football League drafts were conducted separately from the rival NFL through 1966. Starting in 1967, after the NFL agreed to merge with the AFL, the two leagues conducted a "common draft", which was in turn replaced with the modern NFL draft in 1970, upon the completion of the AFL/NFL merger.

In 1961 and 1962, the American Football League drafts were "regional". Teams were assigned broad geographical regions around their home city, and had "rights" to the players within those regions. The AFL's owners reckoned that players would be more willing to play in their league if they had the opportunity to sign with their "home town" teams, and also hoped to attract fans with players with whom they had some familiarity. The AFL also tapped sources which the NFL had disdained: smaller colleges (non Division I-A) and all-black colleges.

During the years in which the American Football League was in direct competition with the NFL for players (and fans), numerous star players chose to play in the AFL. The first and one of the most prominent of these was LSU All-American Billy Cannon, who went on to become an AFL All-Star both as a running back with the Houston Oilers and as a tight end with the Oakland Raiders. Other greats signed by the AFL in the years before the common draft included Abner Haynes and Johnny Robinson (Dallas Texans); Jim Otto (Oakland Raiders); Lance Alworth, John Hadl, and Ron Mix (San Diego Chargers), Lionel Taylor (Denver Broncos); Billy Shaw (Buffalo Bills); Larry Grantham (New York Titans); Matt Snell and Joe Namath (New York Jets); Nick Buoniconti (Boston Patriots) and many others.

== Drafts ==
- 1960 AFL draft
- 1961 AFL draft
- 1962 AFL draft
- 1963 AFL draft
- 1964 AFL draft
- 1965 AFL draft
- 1966 AFL draft
- 1967 NFL/AFL draft
- 1968 NFL/AFL draft
- 1969 NFL/AFL draft

== See also ==
- List of professional American football drafts
- List of American Football League players
