= Dan Klecko =

American football player (born 1981)

No. 90, 92, 61, 68, 49
- Position: Defensive tackle

Personal information
- Born: January 12, 1981 (age 45); Chester, Pennsylvania, U.S.
- Listed height: 5 ft 11 in (1.80 m)
- Listed weight: 275 lb (125 kg)

Career information
- High school: Marlboro (NJ)
- College: Temple
- NFL draft: 2003: 4th round, 117th overall pick

Career history
- New England Patriots (2003–2005); Indianapolis Colts (2006–2007); Philadelphia Eagles (2008); Atlanta Falcons (2010)*
- * Offseason or practice squad member only

Awards and highlights
- 3× Super Bowl champion (XXXVIII, XXXIX, XLI); Second-team All-American (2002); Big East Defensive Player of the Year

Career NFL statistics
- Total tackles: 46
- Sacks: 5
- Fumble recoveries: 1
- Receptions: 10
- Receiving yards: 56
- Receiving touchdowns: 2
- Stats at Pro Football Reference

Dan Klecko (born January 12, 1981) is an American former professional football player who was a defensive tackle and fullback in the National Football League (NFL). He was selected by the New England Patriots in the fourth round of the 2003 NFL draft. He played college football for the Temple Owls.

Klecko was also a member of the Indianapolis Colts, Philadelphia Eagles and Atlanta Falcons. He has earned three Super Bowl rings in his career, two with the Patriots in Super Bowls XXXVIII and XXXIX, and one with the Colts in Super Bowl XLI. He is the son of former New York Jets and Hall of Fame defensive tackle Joe Klecko.

== Professional career ==
=== New England Patriots ===
He was selected by the New England Patriots in the fourth round (117th pick overall) in the 2003 NFL draft. Klecko was a versatile player; he attended Saint Patrick School in Malvern, Pennsylvania, Great Valley High School, graduated from Marlboro High School, and then Temple University as a defensive lineman, but was moved to linebacker in the summer of 2004. He also saw time on special teams, and in his rookie season was a blocking fullback on five of the Patriots' nine running touchdowns.

Klecko was cut by the Patriots after the 2006 preseason.

=== Indianapolis Colts ===
Shortly after his release from New England, Klecko signed with the Indianapolis Colts.

With the Colts, he occasionally filled in for the injured James Mungro as fullback during the 2006 season. Klecko scored his first career touchdown on a 2nd and goal four-yard pass from Peyton Manning against the Miami Dolphins on December 31, 2006.

He also caught a touchdown against the New England Patriots, his former team, to tie the game in the 3rd quarter of the 2006 AFC Championship Game. The Colts went on to win that game. They advanced and won Super Bowl XLI in Miami, Florida.

Klecko was declared an unrestricted free agent on March 2, 2007, but on March 24, 2007, he re-signed with the Colts, agreeing to a one-year contract.

On November 17, 2007, Klecko was waived by the Colts. He was re-signed three days later.

=== Philadelphia Eagles ===
On March 14, 2008, Klecko was signed by his hometown Philadelphia Eagles, who intended to convert him back to fullback. He was brought in to compete with the incumbent Jason Davis. After the Eagles traded for former teammate Luke Lawton, Klecko was moved back to defensive tackle position. He registered a sack against the St. Louis Rams in his first game for the Eagles.

On October 8, 2008, it was announced that Klecko would be moved back to fullback. He switched jersey numbers from No. 68 to No. 49. In the 2009 preseason, the Eagles moved Klecko to defensive tackle and switched his jersey number back to No. 68. He was released from the Eagles on September 5, 2009.

=== Atlanta Falcons ===
Klecko signed a reserve/future contract with the Atlanta Falcons on January 11, 2010. He was waived on September 3.

== Personal life ==
He is the son of Pro Football Hall of Famer, Joe Klecko, best known as a member of the New York Jets' "New York Sack Exchange" of the early 1980s where he featured alongside Mark Gastineau, Marty Lyons, and Abdul Salaam.
