= Abdul Salaam (American football) =

American football player (1953–2024)

No. 74
- Position: Defensive tackle

Personal information
- Born: August 12, 1953; New Brockton, Alabama, U.S.
- Died: October 8, 2024 (aged 71); Cincinnati, Ohio, U.S.
- Listed height: 6 ft 3 in (1.91 m)
- Listed weight: 262 lb (119 kg)

Career information
- High school: Woodward (Cincinnati)
- College: Kent State
- NFL draft: 1976: 7th round, 188th overall pick

Career history
- New York Jets (1976–1983)

Career NFL statistics
- Sacks: 21.0
- Fumble recoveries: 4
- Stats at Pro Football Reference

Abdul Salaam (born Larry James Faulk; August 12, 1953 – October 8, 2024) was an American professional football defensive tackle who played in the National Football League (NFL) for eight seasons with the New York Jets. He played college football for the Kent State Golden Flashes and was selected by the Jets in the seventh round of the 1974 NFL draft. Salaam was a member of the Jets' New York Sack Exchange defense during his NFL career.

== Background ==
Salaam was born Larry James Faulk in New Brockton, Alabama, in 1953. He grew up in Cincinnati, Ohio, where he played baseball and basketball as well as football at Woodward High School. In 1970 his first child, LaTonia Allen was born to Karen Allen In 1972, he married Debbie Rawls, whom he had known since childhood; they had two sons.

== College career ==
Salaam majored in business at Kent State University, while also playing both nose guard and Linebacker with Kent State's "Carat Gold" defense. He earned first-team All-Mid-American Conference three straight seasons.

== Professional career ==
Still known as Larry Faulk when drafted by the New York Jets in the seventh round (188th overall) of the 1976 NFL draft, he had converted to Islam and later changed his name to Abdul Salaam, which means "soldier of peace," in 1977, because he wanted serenity in his life.

The Jets went just 3-11 each of Salaam's first two seasons in the National Football League, however, he was soon joined by Joe Klecko, Mark Gastineau, and Marty Lyons on the Jets' defensive line to form one of the top defensive lines in the NFL, known as the "New York Sack Exchange". The four combined for 66 sacks in 1981 to lead the Jets to their first playoff game since 1969.

In November 1981, Salaam, Gastineau, Klecko, and Lyons were invited to ring the ceremonial opening bell at the New York Stock Exchange that served as the inspiration for their nickname.

The Jets made the playoffs again in 1982, losing the AFC Championship game to the Miami Dolphins. The only game Salaam appeared in for the Jets in 1983 was the final game of the season, a 34–14 loss to the Dolphins in Miami that brought the Jets' record to 7–9. Following the season, he was traded with Kenny Neil to the San Diego Chargers for a 1984 NFL draft second-round pick, but neither player ever made an appearance with his new team. After his NFL career ended, he was a high school football coach.

== Death ==
Salaam died at a Cincinnati hospital on October 8, 2024 at the age of 71. He had been dealing with multiple health issues, including diabetes.
