= Bob Wischusen =

American sportscaster (born 1971)

- Born: October 1, 1971 (age 55)
- Education: Boston College
- Years active: 1993–present
- Sports commentary career
- Genre: Play-by-play
- Sports: NBA (formerly), College basketball, College football, NHL
- Employer: ESPN; WAXQ-FM

Robert Wischusen (/wɪˈʃuːzən/; born October 1, 1971) is an American sports commentator who is currently a hockey, college football and basketball voice for ESPN and the radio voice announcer for the New York Jets on WAXQ-FM.

== Biography ==
=== Early life and career ===
Wischusen grew up in New Jersey and attended Union Catholic Regional High School in Scotch Plains. He then attended Boston College and began his sportscasting experience on WZBC, the school's 1000-watt FM radio station broadcasting to the Greater Boston area. Classmates and fellow broadcasters at WZBC included Joe Tessitore and Jon Sciambi, both of whom also went on to become successful sports announcers, and his colleagues at ESPN.

After graduating from B.C. in 1993, Wischusen went to work in sports radio at WQAM in Miami. After leaving the station he settled in New York, where he has worked since.

=== WFAN and WABC ===
Originally, Wischusen worked for WFAN as a reporter and update host for the station's sports news flashes that aired every twenty minutes. During his time at WFAN he began working on the station's Jets coverage, hosting the pregame, halftime, and postgame shows. When WFAN lost the rights to the Jets after the 1998 season, Wischusen followed the coverage to WABC.

In 2002, he became the play-by-play voice for the Jets on the station after Howard David departed the team for a job in Miami. During his time with the Jets, he has worked with Dave Jennings (1998–2001), Marty Lyons (2002–2023), and Anthony Becht (2024-present) as his color commentators.

=== ESPN ===
Wischusen began working for ESPN in 2006 as a secondary commentator for college football and basketball, usually calling games from mid-major conferences such as the MAC or WAC. In 2009, Wischusen called ACC college football regional action on ABC at 3:30(ET) with Brian Griese. For the 2010 college football season, Wischusen was once again paired with Griese, this time calling games for the Noon(ET) ESPN2 broadcast. Wischusen is currently calling with Louis Riddick.

In 2021, Andrew Marchand of the New York Post reported that Wischusen would start calling play-by-play for the NHL on ESPN. Wischusen has since received enormous praise for the way he calls games, despite only currently serving as ESPN's #2 play-by-play announcer, first pairing with former NHL goalie Brian Boucher and later Olympic gold medalist and national champion A. J. Mleczko, before currently teaming with former New York Rangers captain Ryan Callahan. Both Leah Hextall and Emily Kaplan join Wischusen and Callahan as a rinkside reporter on the secondary team, depending on location.

=== Other duties ===
Wischusen was at one point a substitute announcer for WEPN and MSG's coverage of the Knicks when the announcer Mike Breen is unavailable due to other commitments until the early 2010s. Wischusen also announced for the New York Dragons AFL team during its first season alongside former Jet Greg Buttle with whom he currently calls games for the New York Jets Wischusen also served as a field reporter for NBC's coverage of Game 1 of the 2000 American League Division Series between the New York Yankees and Oakland Athletics. In 2010, Wischusen teamed with Sean McDonough to anchor coverage of the U.S. Open golf tournament on ESPN Radio.
