= Greg Buttle =

American football player

No. 51
- Position: Linebacker

Personal information
- Born: June 20, 1954 (age 72); Atlantic City, New Jersey, U.S.
- Listed height: 6 ft 3 in (1.91 m)
- Listed weight: 235 lb (107 kg)

Career information
- High school: Mainland Regional (Linwood, New Jersey)
- College: Penn State
- NFL draft: 1976: 3rd round, 67th overall pick

Career history
- New York Jets (1976–1984)

Awards and highlights
- All-Time NY Jets Team; NFL All-Pro AFC Topps Selection 1980; NFL All-Pro Team SI Selection 1979; NFL PFWA All-Rookie Team (1976); NCAA Consensus All-American (1975); NCAA 2× First-team All-East (1974, 1975)

Career NFL statistics
- Sacks: 9.5
- Interceptions: 15
- Touchdowns: 1
- Stats at Pro Football Reference

Gregory Ellis Buttle (born June 20, 1954) is an American former professional football player who was a linebacker for the New York Jets of the National Football League (NFL). He played college football for the Penn State Nittany Lions, earning consensus All-American honors in 1975. In 2005, he was inducted into the Nassau County Sports Hall of Fame.

== Early life ==
Buttle grew up in Linwood, New Jersey, and attended Mainland Regional High School in Linwood. Buttle was a 4-sport letterman in football, basketball, baseball and track and field, and was also a champion oarsman while on the Margate City Beach Patrol, as well as participating in musical theatre. He is a member of the Ocean Rowing Hall of Fame.

== Penn State ==
A 1975 consensus All-American, Buttle was also the captain of the Nittany Lions that year. Considered by Penn State coach Joe Paterno "as fine a linebacker as any prospect produced by this school," he still holds the school records for tackles in a game (24), and season (165). He stood atop the Penn State career tackles list for over 30 years, until Paul Posluszny surpassed his mark of 343 versus Wisconsin on November 4, 2006. In 2000 Buttle was honored with the Butkus Silver Anniversary Award, which honors the top college linebacker from 25 years ago. He has been named a Penn State All-Time NFL Player.

== New York Jets ==
Buttle was selected in the third round (#67 overall) of the 1976 NFL draft by the New York Jets for whom he would play nine seasons (1976–1984) at starting outside linebacker. With his talent making a quick impression on the Jets, Head Coach, Walt Michaels made Buttle a Captain in only his rookie season. Buttle was named 1st Team NFL All-Pro at Linebacker for the 1979 season by Sports Illustrated and the NY Daily News. He was recognized as AFC All-Pro by Topps Football cards in 1980. Two interceptions in the Jets' 1981 playoff game against the Buffalo Bills helped fuel a comeback effort, which ultimately fell short, in the franchise's first playoff game since the 1969 season. The following year, he helped lead a NY Jets Defense to the 1982 AFC Championship game against the Miami Dolphins in muddy conditions where he again notched an interception and his hit on Miami RB Andra Franklin caused a fumble that was controversially overturned, likely costing the Jets a trip to the Super Bowl. His football playing career ended in a surprising move when, Buttle was cut in August 1985 by the Jets Head Coach, Joe Walton who was looking to pass veteran players for a younger squad. Notably, Buttle had fellow Penn Stater, Ralph Baker, as his LB coach for 4 seasons who also once wore #51 as a NY Jet and Buttle was a member of defensive coordinator Joe Gardi's Swarm defense which included fellow Nittany Lion Lance Mehl, as well as the famous New York Sack Exchange defensive line. In 2018, Buttle was named to the All-Time NY Jets Team as a LB for their 100th Anniversary.

== Broadcasting ==
Buttle served as an on-air analyst for WCBS-TV in New York City, alongside play-by-play man Ian Eagle, for Jets preseason games, and hosts Jets Gameday on the Jets Radio Network and ESPN New York alongside Don La Greca. He also serves as an analyst on the SNY studio show Jets Nation. He was the temporary fill-in host on WABC radio in NYC, in the 10:00 AM – noon slot, until Geraldo Rivera took the chair permanently on Jan. 3, 2012. On August 7, 2018, it was announced that Buttle would no longer work alongside Eagle for Jets preseason games, having been replaced by former Jets tight end Anthony Becht.

== Personal life ==
Buttle has received numerous honors and awards in recognition of his commitment to the community including National Spokesman for the United Way. He holds a Bachelor of Arts in general arts and sciences from Penn State University. He lives in Northport, New York with his wife, Rita, a son and two daughters.

In 1983, Buttle opened a fitness center in East Meadow, New York.

Buttle was famously quoted about his love of football saying, "They pay me to practice. Sunday I play for nothing."
