= Joe Klecko =

American football player (born 1953)

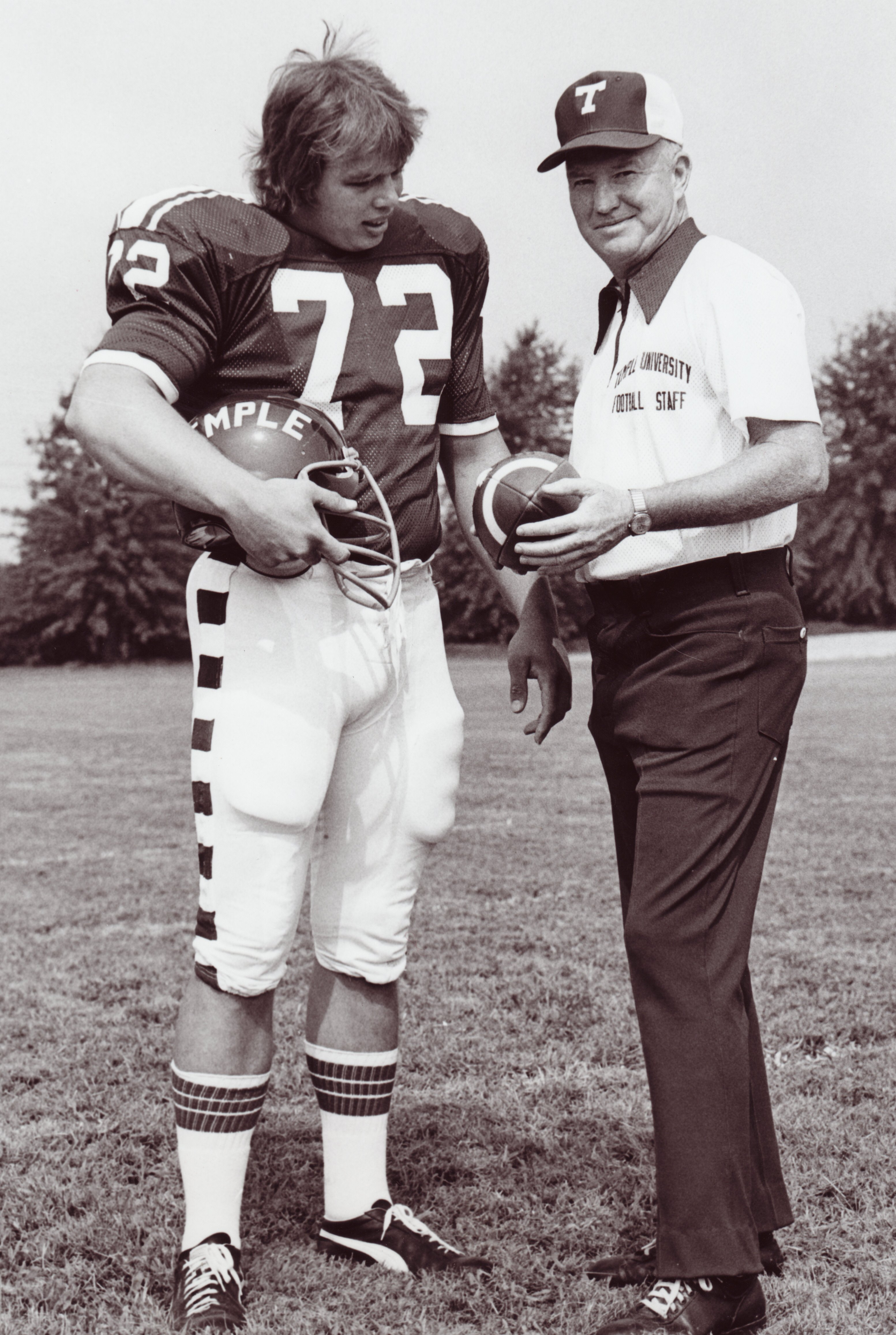
- Klecko, pictured next to Temple coach Wayne Hardin

No. 73
- Position: Defensive tackle

Personal information
- Born: October 15, 1953 (age 73); Chester, Pennsylvania, U.S.
- Listed height: 6 ft 3 in (1.91 m)
- Listed weight: 263 lb (119 kg)

Career information
- High school: St. James (Chester)
- College: Temple
- NFL draft: 1977: 6th round, 144th overall pick

Career history
- New York Jets (1977–1987); Indianapolis Colts (1988)

Awards and highlights
- NFL Defensive Player of the Year (NEA, PFWA) (1981); 2× First-team All-Pro (1981, 1985); Second-team All-Pro (1983); 4× Pro Bowl (1981, 1983–1985); NFL sacks leader (1981); George Halas Award (1982); New York Jets Ring of Honor; New York Jets No. 73 retired; 2× First-team All-East (1974, 1975)

Career NFL statistics
- Games played: 155
- Sacks: 78.0
- Fumble recoveries: 9
- Stats at Pro Football Reference
- Pro Football Hall of Fame

Joseph Edward Klecko (born October 15, 1953) is an American former professional football defensive tackle who played in the National Football League (NFL) for 12 seasons, primarily with the New York Jets. He played college football for the Temple Owls and was selected by the Jets in the sixth round of the 1977 NFL draft. Klecko spent his first 11 seasons with the Jets and his final with the Indianapolis Colts.

A member of the Jets' New York Sack Exchange defense, Klecko was named NFL Defensive Player of the Year in 1981 after leading the league in sacks. Klecko also received four Pro Bowl and two first-team All-Pro selections. He was inducted to the Pro Football Hall of Fame in 2023.

== Early life and college ==
Klecko was born on October 15, 1953, in Chester, Pennsylvania. Klecko played high school football at St. James Catholic High School for Boys in Chester under coach Joe Logue. After graduating, he was not offered a scholarship to any college and went to work for a trucking company. Before going to Temple, and playing under Hall of Fame college coach Wayne Hardin (the former Navy coach who coached two Heisman Trophy winners in Joe Bellino '60 and Roger Staubach '63), Klecko played semi-pro football for the Aston (Pennsylvania) Knights of the Seaboard Football League and kept his eligibility by playing under the assumed name "Jim Jones" from the fictional "Poland University."

Temple's equipment manager saw Klecko play, and recommended Klecko to coach Hardin, who after seeing Klecko play one quarter offered him a scholarship. Klecko led the Temple Owls in tackles his last three seasons (1974–1976), twice making the All-East team and receiving All-American mention as a junior and senior. He was the ECAC's Rookie of the Week on October 27, 1973, after Temple's 31–8 victory over the University of Delaware Blue Hens, in which he had five sacks and 15 tackles. He was inducted into the Temple University Sports Hall of Fame in 1987.

While there was no NCAA boxing, which the NCAA stopped sanctioning in 1960, there was a national club competition among college clubs. Klecko won two club boxing titles with Temple in the heavyweight division.

== Professional career ==
Klecko was selected by the New York Jets in the sixth round (144th overall) of the 1977 NFL draft. Despite eight sacks by Klecko, his team went only 3–11 his first season. However, when he and Abdul Salaam were joined by Mark Gastineau and Marty Lyons on the Jets' defensive line, they formed one of the top defensive lines in the NFL, known as the "New York Sack Exchange." The four combined for 66 sacks in 1981, including a league-leading 20.5 by Klecko, to lead the Jets to their first playoff game since 1969. Klecko was honored with his first All-Pro selection. In November 1981, Klecko, Gastineau, Salaam and Lyons were invited to ring the ceremonial opening bell at the New York Stock Exchange, which served as the inspiration for their nickname.

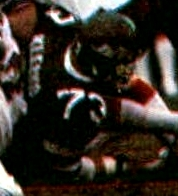
Klecko playing for the Jets in 1981

Klecko appeared in only two regular season games for the Jets in 1982, rupturing the patella tendon in his right knee in the second game of the season against the New England Patriots. The Jets made the playoffs in 1982, losing the AFC Championship game to the Miami Dolphins. Klecko made 2 more appearances with the Jets during their playoff victories over the Cincinnati Bengals and Oakland Raiders.

Klecko moved from defensive end to defensive tackle in 1983, and was named to the Pro Bowl at his new position in 1983 and 1984. The Jets switched to a 3–4 defensive alignment in 1985, forcing Klecko to learn a new position, nose tackle. He led the Jets with 96 tackles and five forced fumbles, and tied for second with 7.5 sacks to earn his second All-Pro selection, and become the second player, after Frank Gifford, in professional football history to be selected to the Pro Bowl at three different positions. Klecko spent the 1986-87 offseason recovering from knee surgery. The knee hadn't fully healed by the start of the 1987 season, and he was limited to only seven games. After the season, the Jets released Klecko. He played one more season with the Indianapolis Colts, who went 9–7 in 1988, including a 34–16 loss to the Jets. Following the season, Klecko retired due to chronic knee problems.

== Legacy ==
Hall of Fame center Dwight Stephenson, in describing Klecko as a "great defensive lineman", considered him one of the two best interior linemen he had ever faced. Hall of Fame tackle Anthony Muñoz said about Klecko, "In my 13 seasons, Joe is right there at the top of the defensive ends I had to block, up there with Fred Dean, Lee Roy Selmon and Bruce Smith. Joe was the strongest guy I ever faced. He had perfect technique — hands in tight, great leverage. My second year, 1981, we went to Shea and beat the Jets, 31–30, but he was such an intense, smart player, I knew I was in a battle. He was the leader, the guy who kept that unit together."

Hall of Fame guard Joe DeLamielleure added that, "You can't think of his ten year period without him. I had to block Joe Greene and Merlin Olsen when I was playing and, believe me, Joe Klecko was equal to those two guys. If Joe Klecko had played one position for ten years, he'd have been considered one of the top two or three players at that position, whichever one it was. There's not another player who went to the Pro Bowl at three different positions. You take a defensive end and put him at nose tackle and he's just as good there, that's a great player. We need to get Joe Klecko in the Hall of Fame."

On December 26, 2004, during a halftime ceremony, the Jets honored Klecko by retiring his #73 jersey. Klecko became just the third New York Jet to have his number retired, joining Hall of Fame quarterback Joe Namath and Hall of Fame wide receiver Don Maynard.

On August 16, 2010, during halftime of the New York Giants–Jets preseason game at the New Meadowlands Stadium, Klecko was inducted as a member of the inaugural class into the Jets' Ring of Honor.

In 2016, the Professional Football Researchers Association named Klecko to the PFRA Hall of Very Good Class of 2016.

On August 17, 2022, Klecko was announced as one of the three finalists nominated by the senior committee for induction in the 2023 Pro Football Hall of Fame class. On February 9, 2023, Klecko was announced as a Class of 2023 inductee to the Pro Football Hall of Fame.

== Personal life ==
The young Klecko converted a '55 Chevy into a dragster and had a job driving dump trucks and oversized tractor-trailer rigs. Even during the NFL off-seasons Klecko was wrestling the 18-wheelers. "I once fought my way across the country carrying a propeller for a supertanker," he says. "The thing weighed 130,000 pounds and was 22 feet across, wide as most roadways." His trucking job earned him cameo roles as a trucker or strongman in four Burt Reynolds films: Smokey and the Bandit (1977), Smokey and the Bandit II (1980), Cannonball Run (1981) and Heat (1986).

Klecko and his wife, Debbie, currently reside in Colts Neck, New Jersey, and have five children, one of whom, Dan, was an NFL defensive tackle for the New England Patriots, Indianapolis Colts, and Philadelphia Eagles, winning three Super Bowls in his career.

In 1993, Klecko was sentenced to three months in prison for perjury in an insurance fraud case. He was pardoned by the Trump Administration on February 12, 2026.

In 2005, Klecko was involved in a fatal car accident, in which he accidentally struck and killed a pedestrian on the Major Deegan Expressway in Bronx, New York. Klecko was not charged or ticketed and was uninjured in the accident.

Klecko sells metal stairs in the Tri-State Area, and serves as a representative for various construction companies.

Klecko is Roman Catholic; he appeared on EWTN Life On The Rock show. He is a member of Catholic Athletes for Christ and speaks on the subject of manhood and faith. Klecko was a guest on Blessed2Play hosted by Ron Meyer where he talked about his Catholic faith and career in the NFL.

In September 2010, SportsNet New York announced that Klecko would be the newest analyst on the New York Jets' post-game show.
