= New York Sack Exchange =

Group of American football players

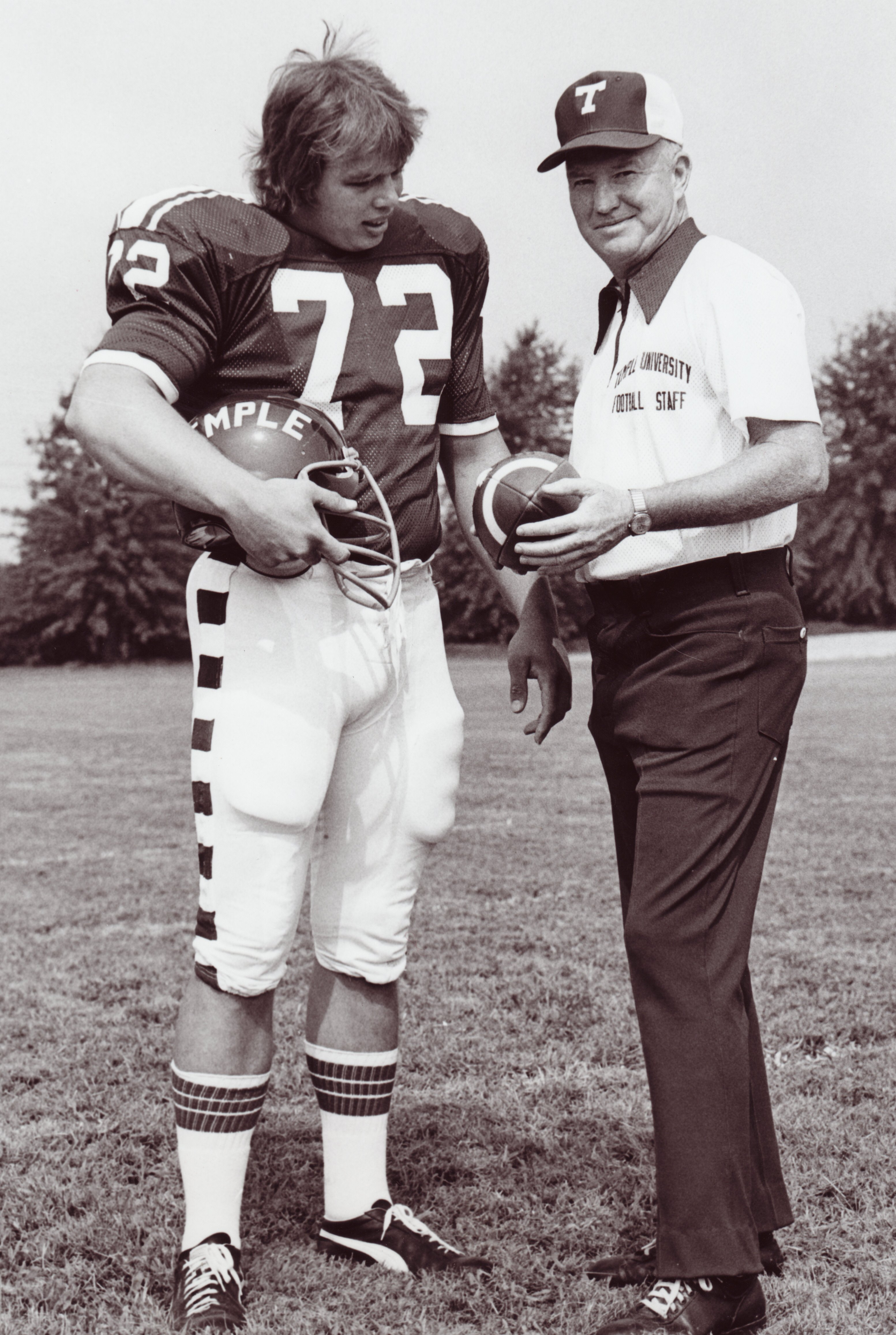
Joe Klecko at Temple with coach Wayne Hardin

The New York Sack Exchange were the front four defensive line of the American football team New York Jets of the National Football League during the early 1980s. The line consisted of Mark Gastineau, Joe Klecko, Marty Lyons and Abdul Salaam.

== Origins ==
In 1981, a fan by the name of Dan O'Connor submitted the "New York Sack Exchange" name to a pre-season contest held by The Jet Report, a team magazine. Jets public relations director Frank Ramos used the nickname in a press release and it was soon picked up by the media.

All four members of the Sack Exchange were drafted by the Jets in the 1970s. Salaam (born Larry Faulk), a defensive tackle from Kent State, was drafted in the 7th round (188th overall) by the Jets in 1976. Klecko, a defensive end from Temple, was a 6th round pick (144th overall) in 1977. Lyons, a defensive tackle from Alabama, was a first round pick (14th overall) in 1979, while Gastineau, a defensive end from East Central Oklahoma State University, was selected with the Jets' second round selection in that draft (41st overall).

== Success ==
It wasn't a question of whether we'd get to the quarterback, it was how many times."

— Marty Lyons

In November 1981, Gastineau, Klecko, Salaam and Lyons were invited to ring the ceremonial opening bell at the New York Stock Exchange, which served as the inspiration for their nickname. Gastineau and Klecko competed to see which defensive end could record the most sacks. In 1981, the Jets led the league with 66 sacks. The Jets reached the 1982 AFC Championship Game.

Salaam was replaced in the starting lineup by Kenny Neil in 1983, then traded after the season. However, Gastineau, Klecko, and Lyons continued to have success for several years, with Gastineau and Klecko making two more Pro Bowls apiece, even after the Jets shifted to the 3-4 defense in 1985. Lyons, the last active member of the Sack Exchange, retired after the 1990 season.

== Legacy ==
The prowess of the New York Sack Exchange, and New York Giants rookie linebacker Lawrence Taylor, caused the NFL to start counting quarterback sacks as a statistic.

Members of the New York Sack Exchange have earned individual honors. The Jets retired Klecko's No. 73 during a halftime ceremony on December 26, 2004. He was then inducted into the Pro Football Hall of Fame in 2023. Lyons was inducted in the College Football Hall of Fame in 2011. Three members of the Sack Exchange have been inducted into the team's Ring of Honor: Klecko in 2010, Gastineau in 2012, and Lyons in 2013.

Klecko and Joe Fields wrote a book on Klecko's career, including details on his personal relationship with Gastineau. A book that told the story of this era of the Jets, titled Sack Exchange: The Definitive Oral History of the 1980s New York Jets, by author Greg Prato, was released in September 2011 via ECW Press.

The New York Sack Exchange was the subject of an eponymous 30 for 30 documentary released by ESPN on December 13, 2024.

== See also ==
- List of NFL nicknames
- Legion of Boom (Seattle Seahawks)

== Bibliography ==
- Chastain, Bill (2010). 100 Things Jets Fans Should Know & Do Before They Die. Chicago, IL: Triumph Books. ISBN 978-1-60078-522-1.
- Lange, Randy (2005). Stadium Stories: New York Jets. Guilford, CT: The Globe Pequot Press. ISBN 0-7627-3783-2.
- Prato, Greg (2011). Sack Exchange: The Definitive Oral History of the 1980s New York Jets. Toronto, Canada: ECW Press. ISBN 978-1-77041-003-9.
