= New York Jets =

NFL team in East Rutherford, New Jersey

- Current season
Logo	Wordmark
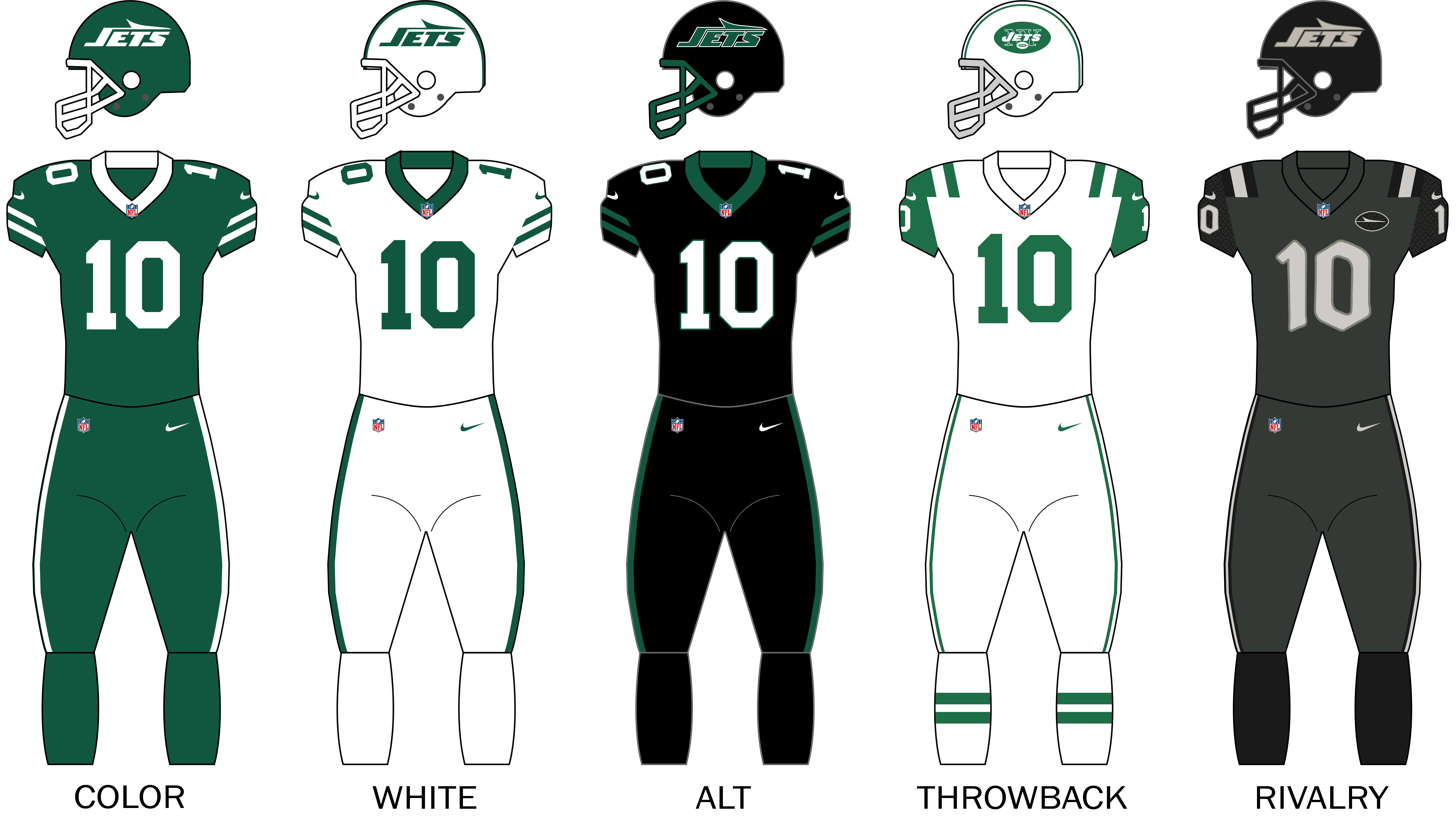
- Uniforms

General information
- Founded: August 14, 1959; 67 years ago
- Stadium: MetLife Stadium; East Rutherford, New Jersey
- Headquartered: Jets Training Center, Florham Park, New Jersey
- Colors: Legacy green, legacy white, legacy black
- Website: newyorkjets.com

Personnel
- Owners: Woody Johnson and Christopher Johnson
- CEO: Christopher Johnson
- General manager: Darren Mougey
- Head coach: Aaron Glenn
- President: Hymie Elhai

Nicknames
- Gang Green; New York Sack Exchange (defensive line, early 1980s); The Green & White; Broadway Jets; Gotham City Football

Team history
- Titans of New York (1960–1962); New York Jets (1963–present)

Home fields
- Polo Grounds (1960–1963); Shea Stadium (1964–1983); Giants Stadium (1984–2009); MetLife Stadium (2010–present)

League / conference affiliations
- American Football League (1960–1969): Eastern Division (1960–1969); National Football League (1970–present): American Football Conference (1970–present); AFC East (1970–present)

Championships
- League championships: 2: AFL championships (pre-1970 AFL–NFL merger) (1) 1968; Super Bowl championships: 1 1968 (III)
- Division championships: 4: AFL East: 1968, 1969; AFC East: 1998, 2002

Playoff appearances (14)
- AFL: 1968, 1969; NFL: 1981, 1982, 1985, 1986, 1991, 1998, 2001, 2002, 2004, 2006, 2009, 2010

Owners
- Harry Wismer (1959–1963); Sonny Werblin (1963–1968); Leon Hess (1968–1999); Hess estate (1999–2000); Woody Johnson (2000–present)

The New York Jets are a professional American football team based in the New York metropolitan area. The Jets compete in the National Football League (NFL) as a member of the American Football Conference (AFC) East division. The team plays its home games at MetLife Stadium (which it shares with the New York Giants) at the Meadowlands Sports Complex in East Rutherford, New Jersey, five miles (eight kilometers) west of New York City. The team is headquartered in Florham Park, New Jersey. The franchise is legally organized as a limited liability company under the name New York Jets, LLC.

The team was founded in 1959 as the Titans of New York, a charter member of the American Football League (AFL); the franchise joined the NFL in the AFL–NFL merger in 1970. The team began play in 1960 at the Polo Grounds in upper Manhattan, the former home of the football and baseball Giants. Under new ownership, the current name was adopted in 1963 and the franchise moved to Shea Stadium in Queens in 1964, then to the Meadowlands Sports Complex in New Jersey in 1984. The team's training facility was located at Hofstra University on Long Island until 2008, when the Atlantic Health Jets Training Center opened in Florham Park.

The Jets advanced to the AFL playoffs for the first time in 1968 and went on to compete in Super Bowl III where they defeated the Baltimore Colts, becoming the first AFL team to defeat an NFL club in an AFL–NFL World Championship Game. However, the Jets have never returned to the Super Bowl, making them one of two NFL teams to win their lone Super Bowl appearance along with the New Orleans Saints, and one of five teams never to win a conference championship since the AFL–NFL merger in 1970, along with the Cleveland Browns, Detroit Lions, and two expansion franchises, the Jacksonville Jaguars (who began play in 1995) and Houston Texans (2002). Since 1970 the Jets have won the AFC East only twice, in 1998 and 2002, the fewest division titles among NFL teams in the post-merger era. They have qualified for the postseason 12 times, and reached the AFC Championship Game four times, most recently losing to the Pittsburgh Steelers in 2010. The Jets have not qualified for the playoffs since then, and currently hold the longest active playoff drought in the NFL and the longest drought in the "Big 4" North American sports leagues. The Jets also have the longest championship drought among New York's major professional sports franchises, having eclipsed the New York Rangers' 54-year drought (from 1940 to 1994) in 2023.

The Jets' team colors are green and white, although they have at times used black as a third/trim color and have had a black alternate uniform since 2019. For most of their history the Jets had white helmets with green stripes and oval or football-shaped logos, and color-inverted jersey sleeves; the current primary uniforms are based on the design used from 1978 to 1989 with simpler striping, green helmets, and a wordmark logo in stylized italic lettering with a jet-plane silhouette above the letters.

== History ==
The first organizational meeting of the American Football League took place on August 14, 1959. Harry Wismer, representing the city of New York at the meeting, proclaimed the state was ready for another professional football team and that he was more than capable of running the daily operations.

Wismer was granted the charter franchise later dubbed the Titans of New York as Wismer explained, "Titans are bigger and stronger than Giants." He secured the Titans' home field at the decrepit Polo Grounds, a place where the team struggled financially and on the field during its first three years. In their first two seasons of existence, coached by Sammy Baugh, the Titans went 7–7 in both 1960 and 1961. By 1962, the debt continued to mount for Wismer, forcing the AFL to assume the costs of the team until season's end.

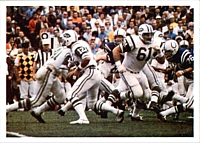
Joe Namath quarterbacking for the Jets in Super Bowl III.

A five-man syndicate of Sonny Werblin, Leon Hess, Philip H. Iselin, Townsend B. Martin, and Donald C. Lillis saved the team from certain bankruptcy, purchasing the lowly Titans for $1 million in 1963. Werblin renamed the team the New York Jets since the team would play near LaGuardia Airport and because it rhymed with the New York Mets as they would be playing in Shea Stadium. The new name was intended to reflect the modern approach of his team. Beginning with Werblin in 1968, Hess gradually bought out his partners' shares of ownership. The Jets' owners hired Weeb Ewbank as the general manager and head coach. Ewbank and quarterback Joe Namath led the Jets to prominence in 1969, when New York defeated the heavily favored Baltimore Colts in Super Bowl III and solidified the AFL's position in the world of professional football.

When the AFL and NFL merged, the team fell into a state of mediocrity along with their star quarterback, Namath, who only had three successful post-merger seasons after injuries hampered much of his career. The Jets continued to spiral downward before enjoying a string of successes in the 1980s, which included an appearance in the 1982 AFC Championship Game, and the emergence of the popular New York Sack Exchange. Walt Michaels and Joe Walton coached the team throughout the decade.

The early 1990s saw the team struggling. After firing coach Bruce Coslet, owner Leon Hess hired Pete Carroll who struggled to a 6–10 record and was promptly fired at the end of the season. Thereafter, Rich Kotite was selected to lead the team to victory; instead he led the Jets to a 4–28 record over the next two years. Kotite stepped down at the end of his second season, forcing the Jets to search for a new head coach.

Hess lured then-disgruntled New England Patriots head coach Bill Parcells to New York in 1997. Parcells led the team back to relevance and coached them to the AFC Championship Game in 1998. Hess died in 1999 while the team, plagued by injuries, produced an eight win record, falling short of a playoff berth. At the end of the season, Parcells stepped down as head coach deferring control to his assistant, Bill Belichick; Belichick resigned the very next day (leaving a napkin at the stage for his introduction, on which he had written "I resign as HC of the NYJ") and went on to accept the head coaching position with the Patriots.

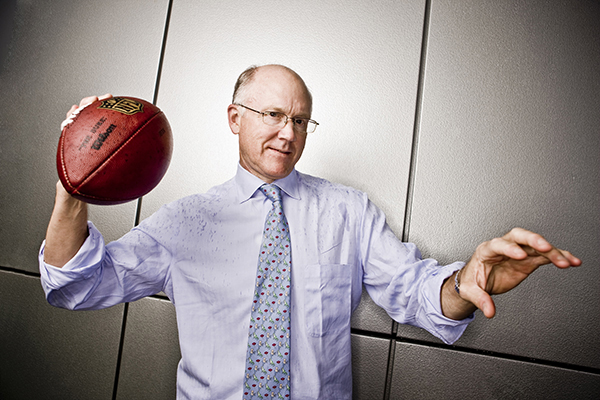
Woody Johnson in 2008

The franchise obtained a new owner in Woody Johnson in 2000. Additionally, through the 2000s the Jets visited the playoffs five times, a franchise record, under the direction of three coaches: Herm Edwards, Eric Mangini, and Rex Ryan. Rex Ryan was hired in January 2009. In the draft that year the Jets would take USC quarterback Mark Sanchez with the fifth overall pick with the intent of making him the franchise centerpiece. Ryan and Sanchez led the team to back-to-back AFC Championship Game appearances during their first two years, but the team never made the playoffs again during their tenure. The Jets had a 6–10 season in 2012 and an 8–8 season in 2013. After a 4–12 season in 2014, Sanchez was released, while Ryan and general manager John Idzik were fired.

Before the 2015 season, Todd Bowles was hired as head coach. In his first season, he led the Jets to a 10–6 record, second in the AFC East, but failed to qualify for the postseason. Then came three consecutive last-place finishes in the AFC East from 2016 to 2018, winning no more than five games each season. Bowles was fired after the 2018 season. Before the 2018 season, the Jets used their first-round pick, third overall, on quarterback Sam Darnold from USC in the NFL Draft. Adam Gase was hired as head coach the following year. Gase led the Jets to a 7–9 record in 2019 and 2–14 in 2020, missing the postseason both years, and was fired. Before the 2021 season, the Jets hired former 49ers defensive coordinator Robert Saleh as head coach. The Jets used their first-round pick, second overall, on BYU quarterback Zach Wilson. The 2021 season saw the Jets go 4–13 to finish last in the AFC East. The 2022 season brought the Jets a 7–10 record but another last-place finish in the division. In the 2023 season, the Jets once again finished 7–10, despite the highly deliberated signing of Aaron Rodgers, who suffered a season-ending Achilles tear on the first offensive series of the regular season. Rodgers was released by the Jets in February 2025 after two seasons with the team, although he remained on the roster until March 12. The 2024 season saw the Jets fire Saleh after a 2–3 start. Jeff Ulbrich finished the season with a 3–9 mark to end with a 5–12 record. Detroit Lions defensive coordinator Aaron Glenn was named as head coach after the season.

== Championships ==
=== AFL championships ===
Season	Coach	Location	Opponent	Score	Record
1968	Weeb Ewbank	Shea Stadium (New York)	Oakland Raiders	27–23	11–3
Total AFL Championships won:					1

=== Super Bowl championships ===
Season	Coach	Super Bowl	Location	Opponent	Score	Record
1968	Weeb Ewbank	III	Orange Bowl (Miami)	Baltimore Colts	16–7	11–3
Total Super Bowls won:						1

=== Division championships ===
Year	Coach	Record
1968	Weeb Ewbank	11–3
1969	Weeb Ewbank	10–4
1998	Bill Parcells	12–4
2002	Herm Edwards	9–7
Total division championships won:		4

== Ownership ==
=== Harry Wismer ===
Harry Wismer, a businessman, had been interested in sports for much of his life when he was granted a charter franchise in the American Football League. Wismer was a three-sport letterman in high school, and went on to play football for the University of Florida and Michigan State University before a knee injury ended his playing career. Undeterred, Wismer began his career as a broadcaster with Michigan State and became a pioneer of the industry. Later, as the Titans owner, Wismer formulated a league-wide policy which allowed broadcasting rights to be shared equally among the teams.

Wismer, who had previously had a 25% stake in the Washington Redskins, was interested in the American Football League and was given a franchise to develop in New York. Wismer, whose philosophy was who you knew mattered most, tried to make the team and the league a success. His efforts began to accrue debt as the Titans' first two seasons were mediocre with attendance dropping in the team's second year. The franchise was sold for $1 million to a five-man syndicate headed by Sonny Werblin of the Gotham Football Club, Inc., in February 1963.

=== Sonny Werblin syndicate ===
Sonny Werblin graduated from Rutgers University and was employed by the Music Corporation of America, eventually becoming president of the company's television division. With a vast knowledge of media, Werblin was determined to put the spotlight on the team. His first order of business, after changing the team's name and jerseys, was to sign Joe Namath to an unprecedented contract. Werblin's gamble would later pay off as Namath, who became a public star, led the Jets on to victory in Super Bowl III, though by then Werblin had sold his stake in the team.

Werblin's partners, Townsend B. Martin, Leon Hess, Donald C. Lillis, and Philip H. Iselin, had a falling out with Werblin over the way the team was run—though the franchise had begun to make a profit, Werblin was making all the policies and decisions himself with little or no input from his partners, much to their dismay. Though Werblin initially resisted their ultimatum to dissolve the partnership, Werblin agreed to be bought out in 1968. Werblin remained involved in the sports community and became the first chairman and CEO of the New Jersey Sports and Exposition Authority where he helped to create the Meadowlands Sports Complex, including Giants Stadium.

=== Leon Hess ===
Leon Hess became well known for his Hess Corporation gas stations; however, he also played an instrumental part in the development of the Jets during his tenure as co-owner and eventual sole owner. Hess had often fought for improvements while the team was a tenant at Shea Stadium but generally stayed away from football operations, allowing his coaches and general manager to make football-related decisions.

Becoming the team's majority stockholder in 1973, Hess bought Philip H. Iselin's share upon his death in 1976 after which only two of Hess' partners remained, Townsend Martin and Helen Dillon, who had inherited the stake from her father Donald Lillis, upon his death. Hess began to buy out the remaining partners in 1981 when he bought Martin's 25% stake for $5 million. Hess bought Dillon's stake three years later for another $5 million, acquiring sole control of the team.

Hess had a passion for his team and took losses hard. In 1995, after a mediocre 6–10 season under Pete Carroll, despite generally shying away from football operations, Hess said, "I'm 80 years old, I want results now" during a press conference in which Rich Kotite was introduced as the team's new coach. After two unsuccessful years with Kotite, Hess heavily involved himself in hiring Bill Parcells in hopes to see his team again reach the Super Bowl. He did not live to see his dream realized, dying on May 7, 1999.

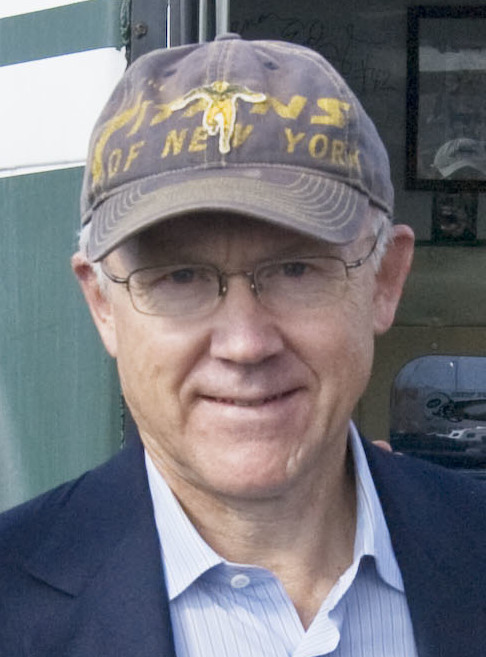
Johnson at a November 2008 game

=== Woody Johnson ===
With the team for sale, two potential buyers were found in Cablevision and billionaire heir Woody Johnson, whose grandfather Robert Wood Johnson II was a member of the family that founded Johnson & Johnson. Johnson was unknown among the other NFL owners at the time of his $635 million purchase of the franchise. However, Johnson had a passion for sports, according to former Knicks general manager Ernie Grunfeld and desired to own his own team. Johnson has been described as an enabler who wants the best from his employees.

Much like Hess, Johnson left many of the football-related decisions up to his management team and tended to avoid the spotlight. However, upon hiring head coach Rex Ryan, Johnson had an increased presence as he molded the Jets into his team.

=== Christopher Johnson ===
In 2017, Woody Johnson was nominated by President Donald Trump as the United States Ambassador to the United Kingdom. Once his post was confirmed, his brother Christopher Johnson became a co-owner and took over the day-to-day operations for the team, including personnel decisions. Woody Johnson's term as ambassador ended in 2021, and he took over ownership duties from Christopher.

== Stadiums ==
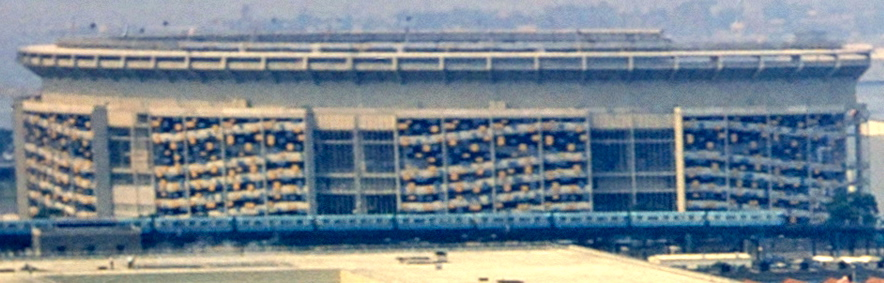
Shea Stadium, 1964

Owner Harry Wismer sought out a place for the team to play their home games but was only able to secure the dilapidated Polo Grounds, which had not had a major tenant since the baseball New York Giants vacated the stadium in 1957. The Titans played their first four seasons at the stadium—in the final season they were renamed the Jets. The Titans shared the stadium with Major League Baseball's new expansion team, the New York Mets, for two years before both teams moved to Shea Stadium in Queens in 1964. The Jets hold the distinction of being the final team to host a game at the Polo Grounds, a 19–10 loss to the Buffalo Bills on December 14, 1963.

Wismer hoped the then Titans could play in what would become known as Shea Stadium beginning in 1961. However, funding difficulties and legal problems delayed construction of the stadium. Wismer signed a memorandum of understanding in late 1961 to secure the Titans' new home. That memorandum recognized that the Mets would have exclusive use of the stadium until they had completed their season. As the team moved to Shea under new ownership, they were, in most years, required to open the season with several road games, a problem made worse in 1969 and 1973 when the Mets had long playoff runs.

Feeling that this arrangement put the Jets at a disadvantage, the team announced in 1977 that they would play two home games a year during the month of September at the Giants' new home in New Jersey, Giants Stadium. Litigation began between New York City and the Jets over the issue, and in the lawsuit's settlement, the city agreed to allow the Jets to play two September home games a season at Shea beginning in 1978 for the remaining six years in the Jets' lease. In 1977, the Jets were to play one September game at Giants Stadium and an October 2 game at Shea.

In spite of these issues, majority owner Leon Hess was interested in renewing the team's lease at Shea, which was due to expire in 1983. Hess negotiated with New York mayor Ed Koch. Hess wanted the city to redevelop the stadium to expand its capacity. He also hoped to renegotiate other aspects of the lease—the Jets received no money from ticketholders parking at Shea. Hess's proposals met resistance from Koch. When negotiations reached an impasse, the Jets announced their intention to depart for New Jersey. On December 10, 1983, the Jets played their final game at Shea and lost to the Steelers 34–7. As fans pillaged the stadium for mementos, the scoreboard read "N.J. Jets" in reference to the Jets' departure to the Meadowlands.

When the Jets joined the Giants at the stadium, many Jets fans hoped the name, Giants Stadium, would be changed. However, the Giants, who had the authority to approve the change, refused. In an effort to conceal the fact that they played in a stadium built and decorated for another team, the stadium grounds crew was assigned to make the stadium more Jet-friendly during Jets games by putting up green banners and placing the Jets' logo over the Giants'. No change could be made to the blue and red seating bowl. The Jets were featured in the first NFL playoff game in the stadium's history, falling to the Patriots on December 28, 1985.

As the Jets sought to become a stronger franchise and remove themselves from their counterparts' shadow, the team entered into negotiations with the Metropolitan Transportation Authority in an attempt to build a stadium on the west side of Manhattan, entering a bidding war with TransGas Energy Systems and Cablevision for the rights to the West Side Yard property—Hess had been approached by former mayor Rudy Giuliani about bringing the team to the West Side when their lease at Giants Stadium expired in 2008. Cablevision was fixated against the Jets owning the land as Madison Square Garden, located only a few blocks away, would be forced to compete with the stadium. Team owners had voted, 31–1, with the Buffalo Bills the only objectors, to award the 2010 Super Bowl to New York, contingent on the Jets winning the bid and completing construction of the stadium before 2010.

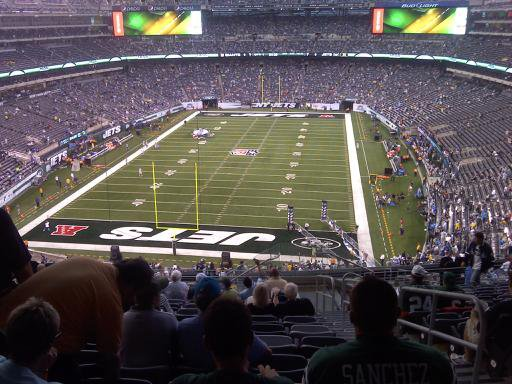
An inside view of MetLife Stadium during the first-ever preseason matchup there between the Giants and Jets

The MTA unanimously voted to sell the land to the Jets for about $210 million as the committee agreed that having the stadium would be beneficial in the long run. An angry Cablevision, community groups and transportation advocates were determined to derail the Jets' attempts at building the stadium and two lawsuits challenging the construction of the stadium on environmental grounds were filed.

Although confident they could secure the stadium, their hopes were dashed when Sheldon Silver and Joseph L. Bruno, both of whom held veto power over the stadium construction, refused to support the project, alleging it would hurt rather than help the development of the West Side.

Defeated, the Jets agreed to enter a 50–50 joint venture with their rival, the Giants, to build a new stadium effectively agreeing to a 99-year lease, which the Giants had signed earlier in the year, to remain in New Jersey. The stadium, known as MetLife Stadium, became the first in the history of the NFL to be jointly built by two franchises. The stadium, which is illuminated in different colors depending on which team is hosting a game, opened in April 2010 and saw the Jets and Giants open the stadium together in a preseason exhibition game. The Jets' first regular season home game at the new stadium was held on September 13, 2010, and was shown nationwide on Monday Night Football. New York lost to the Ravens 10–9. Team owners voted to have the stadium host Super Bowl XLVIII, held in 2014.

== Rivalries ==
=== Divisional ===
==== New England Patriots ====
Since the inception of the American Football League, the Jets have maintained what is considered to be a marquee rivalry with the New England Patriots. The rivalry was relatively docile in its early years until 1966 when the Jets removed the Patriots, who had hopes of appearing in Super Bowl I, from playoff contention with a 38–28 defeat at Shea Stadium. The Patriots returned the favor in 1985 when the Jets lost to New England 26–14 in the wild card round; the Patriots went on to Super Bowl XX where they were defeated by the Bears.

The rivalry began to escalate and receive increased media attention in 1997 when a disgruntled Bill Parcells vacated his head coaching position with New England to accept the same position with New York Jets. The next year, the Jets signed Pro Bowl running back Curtis Martin from the Patriots. After the Jets declined during Parcells' third year, Parcells decided to resign as head coach. His assistant, Bill Belichick, was installed as the new head coach but suddenly resigned the next day at a press conference, just one day after accepting the position, to become the new head coach of the Patriots instead. His decision was influenced by the passing of the team owner, Leon Hess, before the '99 season, who at one point was offering Belichick a $1 million bonus to stay put. However, Belichick had not spoken to the two potential new owners, Woody Johnson and Charles Dolan, and had issues with both because the original agreement with Hess was no longer there; "the whole ownership configuration at that point in time was a major factor in my decision much more than a personal relationship."

A critical turning point of the rivalry took place on September 23, 2001, when Jets linebacker Mo Lewis tackled Drew Bledsoe, leaving the veteran with internal bleeding. This provided an opportunity for Tom Brady to take over as the starting quarterback and during his tenure, Brady successfully guided New England to six Super Bowl titles. In 2006, Eric Mangini, an assistant under Belichick, left New England to join the Jets as their head coach. Under Mangini, the infamous Spygate incident took place, further escalating tensions between both clubs. When Rex Ryan was hired as the team's head coach, the rivalry further escalated due to an increased war of words between both teams. In January 2011, the two met in a Divisional Round playoff game. The visiting Jets pulled a 28–21 upset to advance to the AFC Championship Game, which they ultimately lost one week later to the Pittsburgh Steelers. As of the 2024 season, the Patriots lead the all-time series 75–56–1.

==== Buffalo Bills ====
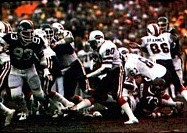
The Jets playing the Bills in the 1981 AFC wild card game.

The Jets and the Bills represent the same state (although the Jets play in New Jersey), and this rivalry represents the differences between New York City and Upstate New York. The teams are both charter members of the American Football League and have generally stayed in the same division since, even after the NFL and AFL merged. The first meeting between the two teams saw the New York Titans, later the Jets, defeat the Bills 27–3. Aside from a few notable moments, such as O. J. Simpson breaking an NFL rushing record against the Jets, the lone playoff game in the series between the two teams in the 1981 Wild Card Round, and ex-Jets coach Rex Ryan coaching the Bills for two years, the rivalry has otherwise been characterized by shared mediocrity and uncompetitive games, including notable blunders by quarterbacks Mark Sanchez of the Jets, and J. P. Losman of the Bills. However, in recent years, the series has heated up again due to a friendly rivalry between quarterbacks Sam Darnold and Josh Allen, who were selected in the first round of the 2018 draft. As of the 2024 season, the Bills lead the all-time series 71–58.

==== Miami Dolphins ====
New York has maintained a rivalry with the Miami Dolphins since the Dolphins' inception in 1966. The lone tie in the series took place in Week 5 of the 1981 season with a 28–28 draw. The Jets' best chance to reach the Super Bowl after the Super Bowl III victory was thwarted by A.J. Duhe in 1983 whose interception return for touchdown on a rain-soaked field in the conference championship game was the decisive score. This remains as the lone postseason meeting in the series. One of the most famous games in Jets history took place in 1994 when the Dolphins ran the Fake Spike play, giving them an improbable victory and halting the Jets' momentum that season, serving as a precursor to the Jets' next two unsuccessful years under Rich Kotite. The Jets went on to complete an improbable victory of their own on October 23, 2000, in what is known as The Monday Night Miracle. The Jets, trailing the Dolphins 30–7 at the end of the third quarter, rallied in the fourth quarter scoring 23 unanswered points, eventually winning in overtime with a 40-yard John Hall kick.

When Rex Ryan became New York's head coach, there was an increased war of words between the clubs culminating with Ryan flashing an obscene gesture to heckling Dolphins fans in January 2010. The rivalry continued between both teams when Sal Alosi, then the strength and conditioning coach of the Jets, tripped Dolphins cornerback Nolan Carroll. Carroll was not seriously injured and Alosi resigned nearly two months later. As of the 2024 season, the Miami Dolphins lead the all-time series, 61–57–1.

=== Interconference ===
==== New York Giants ====
The New York Jets previously maintained a high tension rivalry against their in-town counterparts, the New York Giants, that has since diminished due to the infrequency of the teams meeting in the regular season. The pinnacle of the rivalry came on August 17, 1969, when the Jets and Giants met for the first time, in a preseason game which was viewed as a "turf war" by both sides. The Giants, considered a mediocre team at the time, were regarded as underdogs and faced considerable scrutiny from their fans and the media. The Jets 37–14 win resulted in the firing of Giants coach Allie Sherman.

The Jets met the Giants in 1988 for the final game of the regular season. The Jets, with a 7–7–1 record, had little to lose as their hopes for playoff contention had vanished. The 10–5 Giants were fighting for a playoff spot, and a victory would have clinched a division title and playoff berth. Although the six point favorites, the Giants were unable to overcome a Jets defense that sacked their quarterback Phil Simms eight times. With the Jets' victory and wins by the Rams and Eagles, the Giants were eliminated from playoff contention and the Jets gained respect in the eyes of many.

In spite of the big sibling rivalry that has resulted in trash talk between the players, both teams have formed an unexpected and consequently strong partnership sharing Giants Stadium for 26 years and MetLife Stadium, a venture in which both teams own a 50% share of the venue. The rivalry regained much of its tension in the 2011 NFL season when the Jets and Giants met in Week 16. Both teams needed a victory to keep their playoffs hope alive and there was significant trash talk between Rex Ryan and his players and many of the Giants in the weeks leading up to the game. Ryan and Giants running back Brandon Jacobs reportedly came close to blows after the game, a 29–14 Giants win. The two teams met again on December 6, 2015, with the Jets coming from behind and winning 23–20 in overtime. The teams met again in 2019, with the Jets taking the win 34–27. On October 29, 2023, the Jets won 13–10 in overtime as the visitors. As of the 2023 season, the Giants lead the all-time series 8–7.

== Logos and uniforms ==
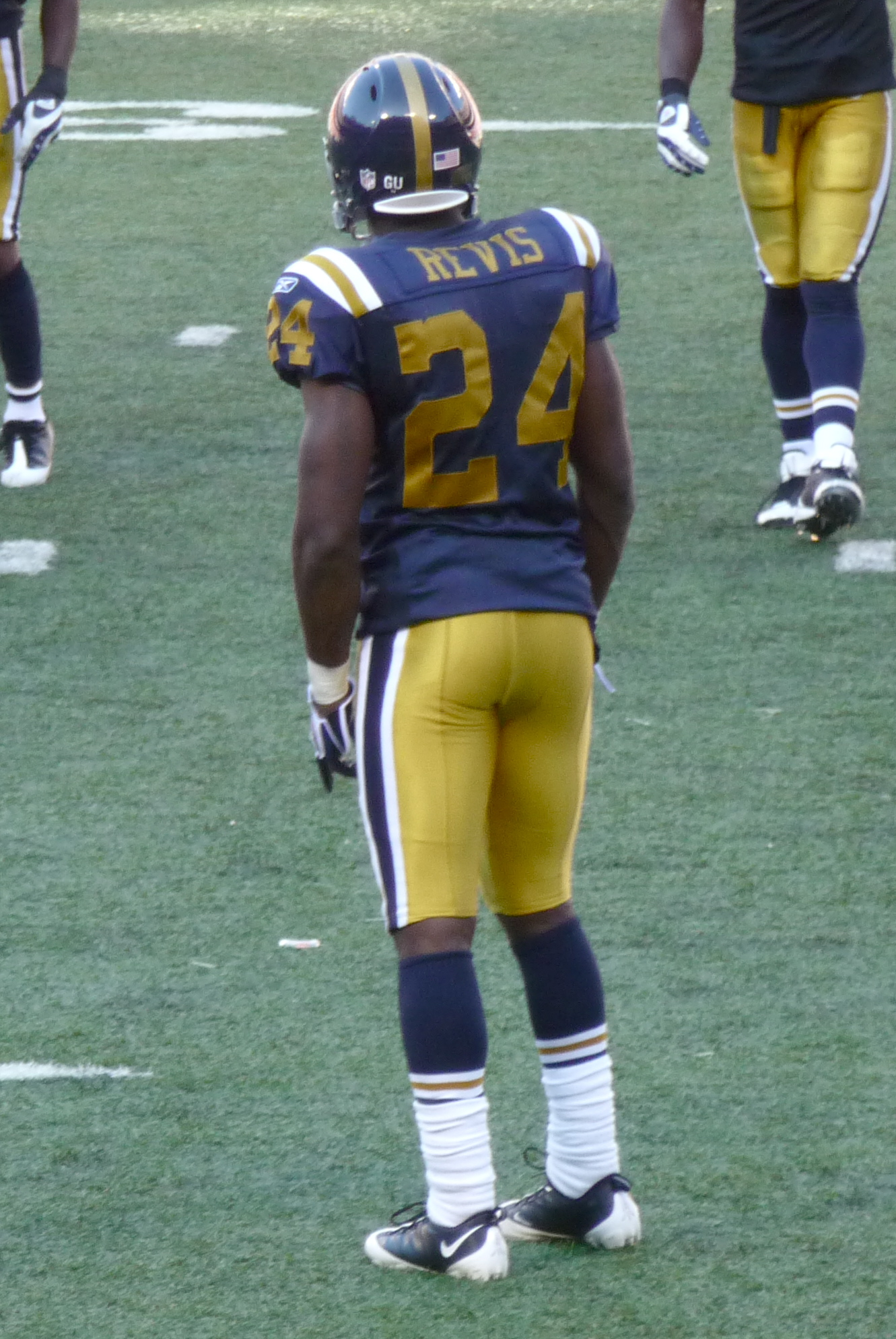
Cornerback Darrelle Revis wearing the New York Titans throwback uniform in 2008. This design combined the original shade of gold from 1960 with the 1961–62 striping modifications

The Jets' original uniforms, as the Titans of New York in 1960, were navy blue with old gold numerals, gold pants with two parallel blue stripes on each side, and navy blue helmets with a single gold stripe down the center and no logo decals. The white jerseys had navy blue numerals. In 1961, the Titans added UCLA-style shoulder stripes (gold and white on the blue jerseys, gold and navy blue on the white jerseys), changed the pants striping to a blue stripe flanked by white stripes, and employed a somewhat brighter shade of gold.

When the Titans became the Jets in 1963, navy and gold were abandoned in favor of kelly green and white. The jerseys had opposite-colored sleeves with thick stripes on the shoulders and cuffs, above and below the TV numerals, and the pants were white with two parallel green stripes on each side. The new helmets were white with a single green stripe down the center; the logo on each side was a silhouette of a jet airplane in green, with the word "JETS" in thick white sans-serif italics along the fuselage. In 1964 the single green center stripe became two parallel stripes, and the jet-plane decal was replaced with a white football shape outlined in green, with the word "JETS" in thick green sans-serif italics in front of "NY" in green outline serif lettering, and a miniature football at bottom center. The decals were difficult to see from a distance (or on television), so the colors were reversed and the decals slightly enlarged in 1965. This design remained largely unchanged through 1977, apart from some variations to the numeral and lettering typefaces, the angle of the helmet decals, and adjustments to the shoulder and sleeve striping due to changes in NFL jersey tailoring and materials.

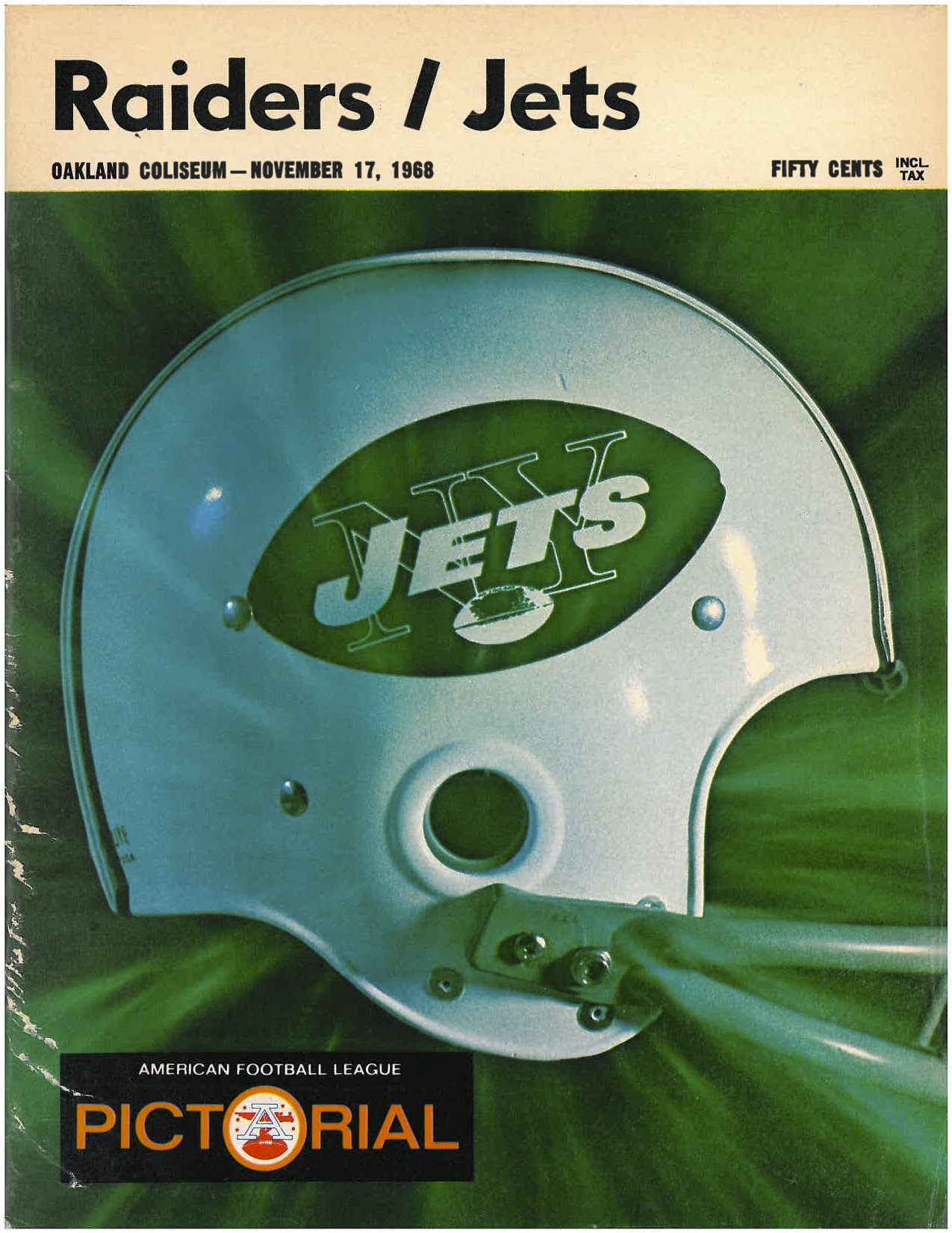
1968 game program showing the 1965–77 helmet and primary logo. The design was revived in 1998 with a darker green, an oval-shaped logo with clearer graphics, and a green facemask.

1978–1997 Jets wordmark and primary logo. A thin black outline was added in 1990. A slightly modified version was adopted as the team's primary logo for the 2024 season.

Jets primary logo used from 2019 to 2023

The Jets' first major design change was made for the 1978 season. The kelly green and white color scheme was retained; the new helmets were solid green with white facemasks, no stripes, and a stylized "JETS" wordmark in white on each side. The mark featured angular lettering and a silhouette of a modern jet airplane extending horizontally to the right from the top of the "J" above the "ETS." The jerseys featured large TV numerals on the shoulders and two thick parallel stripes on the sleeves, while the pants had a single green stripe from hip to knee on each side. In 1990 the Jets modified this design by adding thin black outlines to the numerals, lettering, stripes, and helmet decals, changing the facemasks from white to black, and adding a set of green pants and white socks to be worn with the white jerseys.

The Jets were the first NFL team to wear a "throwback" uniform, in 1993 for a home game against the Cincinnati Bengals, celebrating the 25th anniversary of the 1968 championship team. The jersey and pants mimicked the 1963–77 design, although the team wore its regular green helmets with a white-outlined version of the 1965–77 logo decal. In 1994, as part of the NFL's 75th Anniversary celebration, the Jets wore both home and road versions of this uniform in select games, again using their regular green helmets with the 1965–77 logo but with two parallel white stripes down the center.

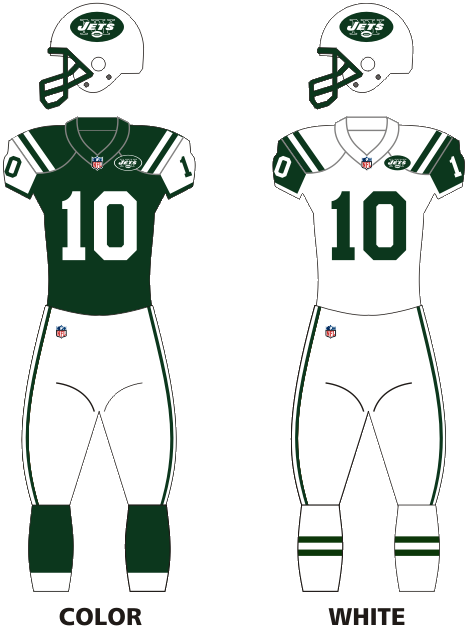
The team's uniform design used from 1998 to 2018, a modern version of its 1965–77 design.

The Jets adopted a new uniform and logo design in 1998, a modernization of the 1965–77 set with a darker hunter green replacing the bright kelly green, and the primary logo now oval rather than football-shaped and updated with starker lines. Green pants and striped white socks were added in 2002, and were worn with both the white and green jerseys.

In 2007, the Jets introduced a new "throwback" uniform evoking the original Titans of New York and combining elements of the 1960 and 1961–62 uniforms, with navy blue helmets and jerseys, old gold numerals and helmet stripes, gold and white shoulder stripes, and gold pants with blue and white stripes on each side. These uniforms appeared again in 2008, 2009 and 2011, with a white-jersey variation also appearing in 2009 as part of the NFL's celebration of the American Football League's 50th anniversary.

The Jets abandoned their classic look for a second time in 2019, with a new uniform design featuring a medium shade of green which the franchise called "Gotham Green," reincorporating black as a third/trim color, and reverting to green helmets with a metallic paint finish and black facemasks. The jerseys and pants now had tapered striping, a "NEW YORK" wordmark on the upper chest, and a new sans-serif block-style numeral font. The primary logo reverted to a football shape, and eliminated the background "NY" initials in favor of "NEW YORK" in sans-serif italics above "JETS," which was modified to make the "J" the same height as the other letters and moved slightly downward, with the revised football graphic now covering the lower portion of the letters "E" and "T"; the helmet decal was a secondary logo featuring only the "JETS" wordmark and football. The team also introduced a black alternate uniform with green striping and white numerals outlined in green. In 2022, with league rule changes allowing for a second helmet shell, the black uniform was paired with a matte-black alternate helmet with a metallic-green facemask and the "JETS" logo in green outlined in white.

In 2023, the Jets introduced a "legacy white" throwback uniform resembling the 1978–89 design, then announced at the end of the season that this would become the team's primary uniform in 2024, with green and black versions added to complete the set. For this rebrand the 1978 "JETS" logo was slightly modified to condense the spacing between the letters, and to widen the tail and streamline the nose of the jet-plane silhouette. The primary uniforms resemble the 1978–89 design in most respects, although the "Gotham Green" shade (renamed "Legacy Green") and metallic-finish helmet shells were carried over and the set includes a green pants option; the black alternates apply the same color scheme as the outgoing set to the new template. The Jets also released a "Classic" white uniform which is based on the 1965–77 and 1998–2018 designs.

In 2025 the Jets were one of eight teams to add a "Rivalries" uniform as part of a program by the NFL and Nike, to be worn in one home game against a divisional opponent. The base color of the jerseys and pants is a slightly green-tinted shade of black, with silver numerals outlined in dark grey in a custom "Gothic" typeface, black-grey-black stripes over the shoulders and along the pants seams, and black sleeves with a grey pattern meant to resemble New York City manhole covers; the helmets are black with black facemasks, grey-outlined silver wordmark decals, and a dark grey center stripe with the manhole-cover pattern.

== Cheerleading squad ==
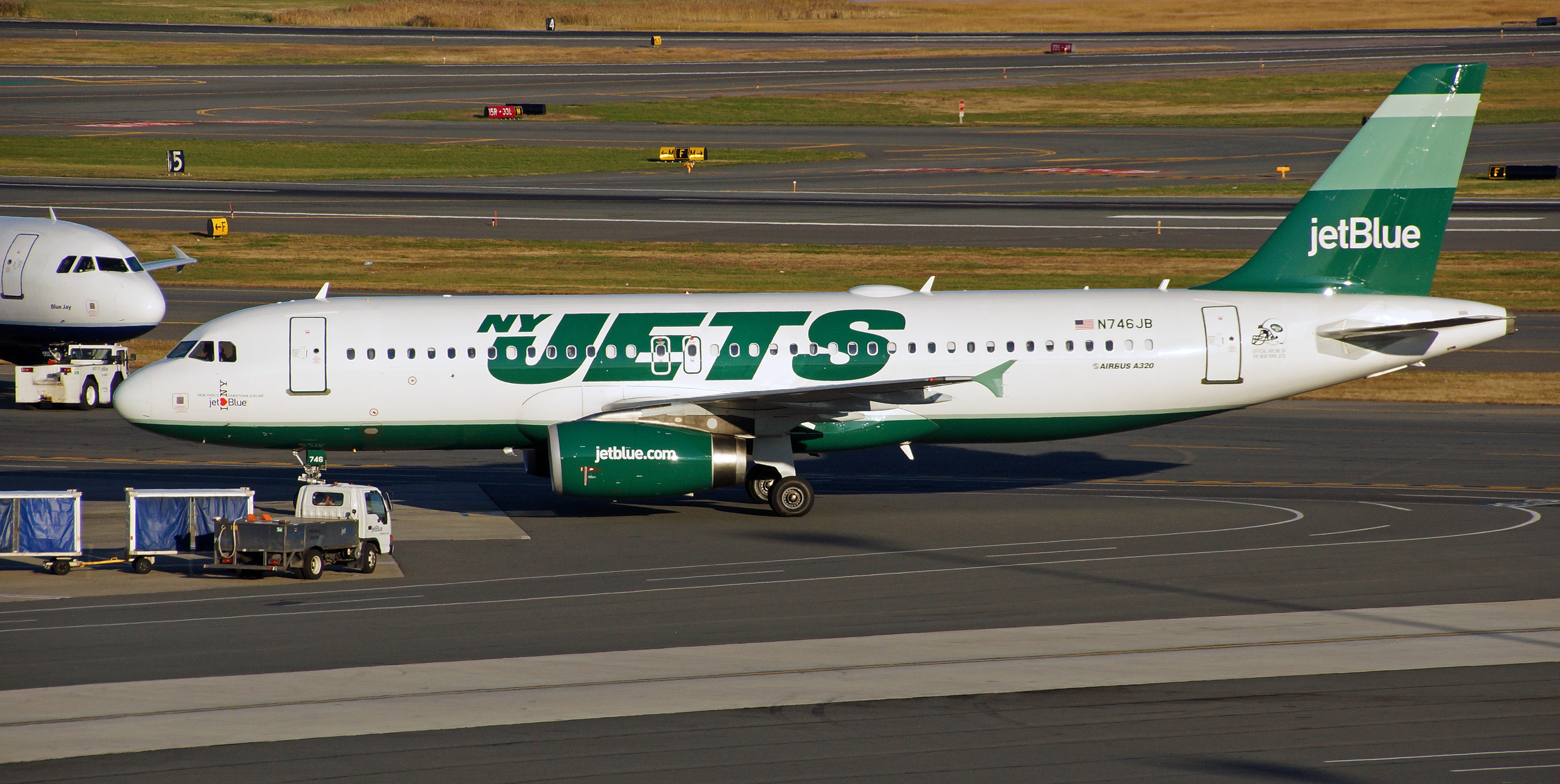
JetBlue honors the Jets with its NY Jets livery.

The original Jets Flag Crew was established in 2006. In 2007, the group underwent an expansion and was renamed the Jets Flight Crew. The squad regularly performs choreographed routines during the team's home contests. Auditions have been held annually since their inception to attract new members.

The Jets Junior Flight Crew was established in 2010, offering children the opportunity to train with the Flight Crew while improving their "talent and abilities in a non-competitive environment."

== Radio and television ==
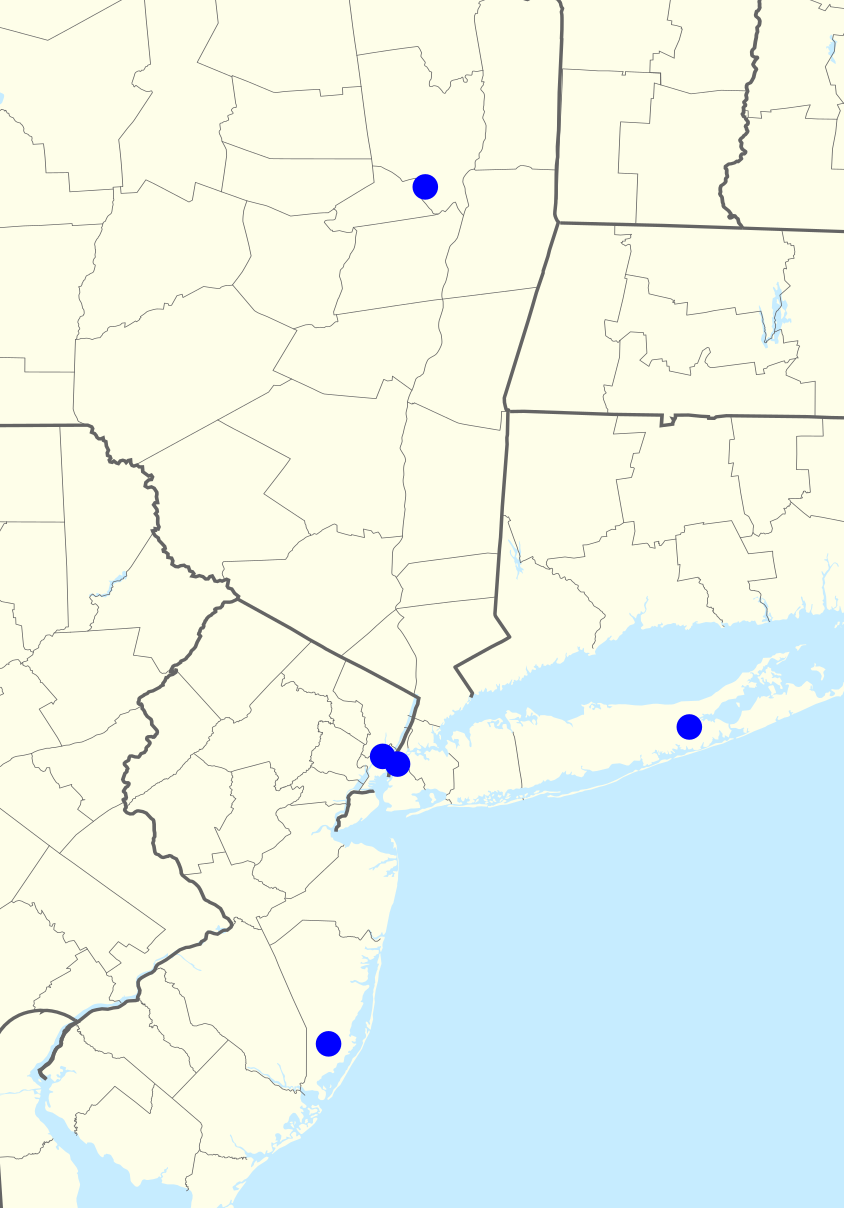
Map of radio affiliates

The Jets' current flagship radio station is WAXQ, which is owned by iHeartMedia. The station became the Jets' flagship in February 2024 after Good Karma Brands, the owner of former flagship station WPEN-AM, elected to end its agreement with Emmis Communications to operate WEPN-FM and stop simulcasting its programming on the station.

As of the 2024 season, Bob Wischusen is the play-by-play announcer, with Anthony Becht as the analyst. Wischusen has been the voice of the Jets since the 2002 season, taking over the role when Howard David became the voice of the Miami Dolphins. Becht, the former Jets tight end, took over the analyst role for 2024 after Marty Lyons, a former member of the New York Sack Exchange from the 1980s Jets, resigned his position to take on a new role with the team as a brand ambassador.

Any preseason games not nationally televised are shown on WCBS-TV. SportsNet New York, which serves as the official home of the Jets, airs over 250 hours of "exclusive, in depth" material on the team in high definition.

Monday Night Football games are televised in a simulcast with ESPN by either sister station WABC-TV, or WPIX if WABC chooses to waive the game to another station to carry regularly scheduled programming. Thursday Night Football games streamed by Amazon Prime are carried locally by WNYW.

== Season-by-season record ==
This is a partial list of the Jets' last five completed seasons.

Note: The finish, wins, losses, and ties columns list regular season results and exclude any postseason play.

Super Bowl champions (1970–present)	Conference champions	Division champions	Wild Card berth

As of February 19, 2026

Season	Team	League	Conference	Division	Regular season				Postseason results	Awards
Season	Team	League	Conference	Division	Finish	Wins	Losses	Ties	Postseason results	Awards
2021	2021	NFL	AFC	East	4th	4	13	0	—	—
2022	2022	NFL	AFC	East	4th	7	10	0	—	—
2023	2023	NFL	AFC	East	3rd	7	10	0	—	—
2024	2024	NFL	AFC	East	3rd	5	12	0	—	—
2025	2025	NFL	AFC	East	4th	3	14	0	—	—

== Jets franchise records ==
=== Player records ===
- Most games played: 250 games: Pat Leahy, 1974-1991
- Most games started: 199 games: - (2 times)
  - Randy Rasmussen, 1984-1996
  - Mo Lewis, 1991-2003
- Most consecutive games played: 195 games: Winston Hill, 1963-1976
- Most consecutive games started:
  - 174 games: Winston Hill, September 12, 1964 to October 18, 1976
  - 160 games: D'Brickashaw Ferguson, September 10, 2006 to January 3, 2016
  - 138 games: Brandon Moore, November 7, 2004 to December 30, 2012
  - 122 games: Jim Sweeney, October 25, 1987 to December 24, 1994
  - 121 games: David Harris, December 7, 2008 to October 9, 2016
  - 118 games: Kevin Mawae, September 6, 1998 to October 16, 2005
  - 117 games: Curtis Martin, October 19, 1998 to December 4, 2005
  - 103 games: James Hasty, November 6, 1988 to December 24, 1994
  - 103 games: Mo Lewis, August 31, 1997 to October 26, 2003
- Most consecutive games started by a quarterback:
  - 72 games: Richard Todd, September 9, 1979 to December 16, 1983
  - 60 games: Joe Namath, September 18, 1966 to October 18, 1970
  - 49 games: Mark Sanchez, December 20, 2009 to December 17, 2012
  - 36 games: Vinny Testaverde, September 3, 2000 to September 29, 2002
  - 32 games: Ken O'Brien, September 9, 1990 to December 22, 1991
  - 27 games: Joe Namath, December 16, 1973 to December 7, 1975
  - 27 games: Al Dorow, September 17, 1960 to December 17, 1961
  - 26 games: Ken O'Brien, November 18, 1984 to October 5, 1986
  - 24 games: Geno Smith, September 8, 2013 to October 26, 2014
  - 22 games: Ryan Fitzpatrick, September 13, 2015 to October 17, 2016
  - 20 games: Boomer Esiason, September 5, 1993 to September 25, 1994
- Most consecutive extra points: 181 consecutive made: Nick Folk, September 13, 2010 to September 11, 2016
- Most consecutive field goal: 26 consecutive made: Greg Zuerlein, October 8, 2023 to December 28, 2023
- Most rushing yards: 10,302 rushing yards: Curtis Martin, 1998-2005
- Most rushing yards in a game:
  - 219 rushing yards: Isaiah Crowell, vs. Denver Broncos, October 7, 2018
  - 210 rushing yards: Thomas Jones, vs. Buffalo Bills, October 18, 2009
  - 203 rushing yards: Curtis Martin, vs. Indianapolis Colts, December 3, 2000
- Longest runs scrimmage: 90 yards: Johnny Johnson, vs. Chicago Bears, September 25, 1994 (No touchdown scored)
- Most receiving yards: 11,732 receiving yards: Don Maynard, 1960-1972
- Most receiving yards in a game: 228 receiving yards: Don Maynard, at Oakland Raiders, November 17, 1968
- Most receiving yards in one half: 198 receiving yards: Davante Adams, at Jacksonville Jaguars, December 15, 2024 (2nd half)
- Most passing yards in a game: 496 passing yards: Joe Namath, at Baltimore Colts, September 24, 1972
- Most field goal in a game:
  - 7 field goal: Jason Myers, vs. Indianapolis Colts, October 14, 2018
  - 6 field goal: Bobby Howfield, vs. New Orleans Saints, December 3, 1972
  - 6 field goal: Jim Turner, vs. Buffalo Bills, November 3, 1968
- Most field goal in one half: 4 field goal: - (7 times)
  - Jim Turner, vs. Cincinnati Bengals, November 23, 1969 (1st half)
  - Bobby Howfield, vs. New Orleans Saints, December 3, 1972 (2nd half)
  - Pat Leahy, vs. Indianapolis Colts, September 29, 1985 (1st half)
  - Jay Feely, vs. St. Louis Rams, November 9, 2008 (1st half)
  - Jay Feely, at Tampa Bay Buccaneers, December 13, 2009 (1st half)
  - Nick Folk, at New England Patriots, October 16, 2014 (1st half)
  - Jason Myers, vs. Indianapolis Colts, October 14, 2018 (2nd half)
- Most field goal in one quarter: 3 field goal: - (7 times)
  - Jim Turner, vs. New England Patriots, October 29, 1967 (3rd quarter)
  - Bobby Howfield, vs. New Orleans Saints, December 3, 1972 (4th quarter)
  - Mike Nugent, at Minnesota Vikings, December 17, 2006 (2nd quarter)
  - Jay Feely, vs. St. Louis Rams, November 9, 2008 (2nd quarter)
  - Jason Myers, vs. Indianapolis Colts, October 14, 2018 (4th quarter)
  - Greg Zuerlein, vs. Philadelphia Eagles, October 15, 2023 (2nd quarter)
  - Greg Zuerlein, vs. Houston Texans, December 10, 2023 (4th quarter)
- Most field goal by a opponent in a game:
  - 7 field goal: Jason Sanders, vs. Miami Dolphins, December 8, 2019
  - 6 field goal: Steve Christie, vs. Buffalo Bills, October 20, 1996
  - 6 field goal: Tyler Bass, vs. Buffalo Bills, October 25, 2020
- Most field goal by a opponent in one half: 4 field goal: - (6 times)
  - Skip Butler, at Houston Oilers, October 1, 1972 (2nd half)
  - Steve Christie, vs. Buffalo Bills, October 20, 1996 (2nd half)
  - Adam Vinatieri, vs. New England Patriots, September 11, 2000 (1st half)
  - Jason Sanders, vs. Miami Dolphins, December 8, 2019 (2nd half)
  - Tyler Bass, vs. Buffalo Bills, October 25, 2020 (2nd half)
  - Brandon Aubrey, at Dallas Cowboys, September 17, 2023 (2nd half)
- Most field goal by a opponent in one quarter: 3 field goal: - (9 times)
  - Gino Cappelletti, vs. New England Patriots, October 1, 1961 (1st quarter)
  - Mike Mercer, vs. Kansas City Chiefs, November 27, 1966 (2nd quarter)
  - Skip Butler, at Houston Oilers, October 1, 1972 (3rd quarter)
  - Roy Gerela, at Pittsburgh Steelers, October 21, 1973 (2nd quarter)
  - Jim Turner, vs. Denver Broncos, October 28, 1973 (2nd quarter)
  - Joe Danelo, at Buffalo Bills, September 23, 1984 (3rd quarter)
  - Steve Christie, vs. Buffalo Bills, October 20, 1996 (4th quarter)
  - Adam Vinatieri, vs. New England Patriots, September 11, 2000 (2nd quarter)
  - Jason Sanders, vs. Miami Dolphins, December 8, 2019 (4th quarter)
- Most touchdowns scored in a game: 4 touchdowns: Wesley Walker, vs. Miami Dolphins, September 21, 1986
- Most touchdowns scored in one quarter: 3 touchdowns: Billy Joe, vs. New England Patriots, October 27, 1968 (4th quarter)
- Most touchdowns scored by a opponent in a game: 5 touchdowns: - (2 times)
  - Cookie Gilchrist, at Buffalo Bills, December 8, 1963
  - Billy Cannon, vs. Houston Oilers, December 10, 1961
- Most touchdowns scored by a opponent in one half: 4 touchdowns: Mark Ingram Sr., vs. Miami Dolphins, November 27, 1994 (2nd half)
- Most passing touchdowns in a game at home: 6 touchdown: Brett Favre, vs. Arizona Cardinals, September 28, 2008
- Most passing touchdowns in a game on road: 6 touchdown: Joe Namath, at Baltimore Colts, September 24, 1972
- Most passing touchdowns by a opponent in a game at home: 6 touchdowns: Dan Marino, vs. Miami Dolphins, September 21, 1986
- Most passing touchdowns by a opponent in a game on road:
  - 7 touchdowns: George Blanda, at Houston Oilers, November 19, 1961 (Tied NFL Records)
  - 6 touchdowns: George Blanda, at Houston Oilers, October 14, 1962
- Most passing touchdowns in one half: 4 touchdowns: - (5 times)
  - Vinny Testaverde, vs. Miami Dolphins, October 23, 2000 (2nd half)
  - Ken O'Brien, vs. Tampa Bay Buccaneers, November 17, 1985 (1st half)
  - Richard Todd, vs. Oakland Raiders, October 23, 1977 (1st half)
  - Joe Namath, at Baltimore Colts, September 24, 1972 (1st half)
  - Al Dorow, at Dallas Texans, October 2, 1960 (1st half)
- Most passing touchdowns by a opponent in one half: 5 touchdowns: George Blanda, at Houston Oilers, November 19, 1961 (1st half)
- Most passing touchdowns in one quarter: 4 touchdowns: Vinny Testaverde, vs. Miami Dolphins, October 23, 2000 (4th quarter)
- Most passing touchdowns by a opponent in one quarter: 4 touchdowns: Ken Stabler, at Houston Oilers, November 23, 1980 (4th quarter)
- Most interceptions in a game: 3 interceptions: - (9 times)
  - Jordan Whitehead, vs. Buffalo Bills, September 11, 2023
  - Ty Law, vs. Buffalo Bills, January 1, 2006
  - Marcus Coleman, vs. Miami Dolphins, October 23, 2000
  - Marcus Turner, at Minnesota Vikings, November 20, 1994
  - Erik McMillan, vs. Miami Dolphins, October 23, 1988
  - Rich Sowells, at Baltimore Colts, September 23, 1973
  - Bill Baird, vs. Boston Patriots, October 31, 1964
  - Dainard Paulson, vs. Oakland Raiders, September 28, 1963
  - Lee Riley, vs. Buffalo Bills, December 8, 1962
- Most interceptions by a opponent in a game: 4 interceptions: Willie Brown, at Denver Broncos, November 15, 1964 (Tied NFL Records)
- Most blocked kicks in a game: 2 blocked kicks: Jim Bailey, vs. Miami Dolphins, October 19, 1975
- Most blocked extra points in a game: 2 blocked kicks: Jim Bailey, vs. Miami Dolphins, October 19, 1975

=== Team records ===
- Longest winning streak: 9 wins: September 21, 1986 to November 16, 1986
- Longest home winning streak: 9 wins: October 27, 1968 to November 9, 1969
- Longest road winning streak: 8 wins: December 3, 2009 to November 14, 2010
- Longest losing streak: 13 losses: September 13, 2020 to December 13, 2020
- Longest home losing streak: 13 losses: November 5, 1995 to September 7, 1997
- Longest road losing streak: 12 losses: December 8, 1963 to October 3, 1965
- Longest winning streak to start the season: 5 wins: 2004
- Longest losing streak to start the season: 13 losses: 2020
- Largest comeback: 23 points: vs. Miami Dolphins, October 23, 2000
- Largest 4th quarter comeback: 23 points: vs. Miami Dolphins, October 23, 2000
- Largest blown lead: 21 points: - (4 times)
  - vs. New England Patriots, November 10, 1996
  - vs. Indianapolis Colts, September 10, 1995
  - vs. Philadelphia Eagles, October 3, 1993
  - vs. Atlanta Falcons, October 23, 1983
- Largest 4th quarter blown lead: 17 points: at Buffalo Bills, September 10, 1967
- Fewest takeaway in a season: 4 takeaway: 2025 (NFL Records)
- Fewest interceptions in a season: 0 interceptions: 2025 (NFL Records)
- Most total yards in a game: 597 total yards: vs. Miami Dolphins, November 27, 1988
- Most total yards in one half: 346 total yards: vs. Miami Dolphins, November 27, 1988 (1st half)
- Most total yards in one quarter: 247 total yards: vs.Miami Dolphins, October 23, 2000 (4th quarter)
- Most total yards allowed in one quarter: 221 total yards: vs. Denver Broncos, October 7, 2018 (2nd quarter)
- Most total yards by both teams in one half: 551 total yards: New York Jets (299) at Indianapolis Colts (252), November 4, 2021 (2nd half)
- Fewest total yards in a game: 63 total yards: at Buffalo Bills, January 9, 2022
- Fewest total yards in one half: -6 total yards: at Buffalo Bills, January 9, 2022 (2nd half)
- Fewest total yards in one quarter: -14 total yards: - (2 times)
  - at Denver Broncos, December 10, 2017 (1st quarter)
  - at Jacksonville Jaguars, October 27, 2019 (2nd quarter)
- Fewest total yards allowed in one half: 4 total yards: vs. Kansas City Chiefs, December 11, 2011 (1st half)
- Fewest total yards allowed in one quarter: -19 total yards: vs. Kansas City Chiefs, December 11, 2011 (2nd quarter)
- Fewest total yards by both teams in one half: 147 total yards: New York Jets (101) vs. Denver Broncos (46), September 29, 2024 (1st half)
- Fewest total yards by both teams in one quarter: 21 total yards: New York Jets (15) vs. Denver Broncos (6), September 29, 2024 (1st quarter)
- Most field goal by both teams in a game: 10 field goal: New York Jets (3) vs. Miami Dolphins (7), December 8, 2019 (NFL Records)
- Most field goal by both teams in one quarter: 5 field goal: New York Jets (2) vs. Miami Dolphins (3), December 8, 2019 (4th quarter)
- Most points in a game at home: 62 points: vs. Tampa Bay Buccaneers, November 17, 1985
- Most points in a game on road: 48 points: at Detroit Lions, September 10, 2018
- Most points allowed in a game at home: 53 points: vs. San Diego Chargers, November 2, 1963
- Most points allowed in a game on road: 56 points: (2 times)
  - at New England Patriots, September 9, 1979
  - at Houston Oilers, October 14, 1962
- Most points by both teams in a game at home:
  - 96 points: New York Jets (51) vs. Miami Dolphins (45), September 21, 1986
  - 91 points: New York Jets (56) vs. Arizona Cardinals (35), September 28, 2008
- Most points by both teams in a game on road:
  - 93 points: New York Titans (43) at Los Angeles Chargers (50), December 18, 1960
  - 91 points: New York Titans (46) at Denver Broncos, (45), November 22, 1962
- Fewest points by both teams in a game at home: 6 points: New York Jets (6) vs. Pittsburgh Steelers (0), December 14, 2003
- Fewest points by both teams in a game on road:
  - 3 points: New York Jets (3) at Washington Redskins (0), December 11, 1993
  - 6 points: New York Jets (6) at New England Patriots (0), November 28, 1993
  - 6 points: New York Jets (0) at Indianapolis Colts (6), October 11, 1987
- Most points in first quarter at home: 17 points: (4 times)
  - vs. Washington Commanders, December 24, 2023
  - vs. Pittsburgh Steelers, November 9, 2014
  - vs. St. Louis Rams, November 9, 2008
  - vs. Tampa Bay Buccaneers, November 17, 1985
- Most points in first quarter on road: 21 points: at Buffalo Bills, October 7, 2001
- Most points in second quarter at home:
  - 34 points: vs. Arizona Cardinals, September 28, 2008
  - 28 points: vs. Miami Dolphins, September 21, 1986
  - 24 points: vs. Tampa Bay Buccaneers, November 17, 1985
  - 24 points: vs. Denver Broncos, October 31, 1965
  - 23 points: vs. St. Louis Rams, November 9, 2008
- Most points in second quarter on road: 24 points: (2 times)
  - at Chicago Bears, December 26, 2010
  - at Miami Dolphins, October 23, 1988
- Most points in third quarter at home: 21 points: (5 times)
  - vs. Oakland Raiders, November 24, 2019
  - vs. Indianapolis Colts, December 10, 1988
  - vs. New England Patriots, September 21, 1987
  - vs. Buffalo Bills, October 18, 1981
  - vs. Denver Broncos, October 28, 1973
- Most points in third quarter on road: 31 points: at Detroit Lions, September 10, 2018
- Most points in fourth quarter at home:
  - 30 points: vs. Miami Dolphins, October 23, 2000
  - 28 points: vs. New England Patriots, October 27, 1968
  - 22 points: vs. Arizona Cardinals, September 28, 2008
  - 22 points: vs. Miami Dolphins, December 12, 1999
- Most points in fourth quarter on road:
  - 24 points: at Cleveland Browns, December 10, 1978
  - 23 points: at Cincinnati Bengals, October 26, 2025
- Most points in first half at home:
  - 41 points: vs. Tampa Bay Buccaneers, November 17, 1985
  - 40 points: vs. St. Louis Rams, November 9, 2008
  - 35 points: vs. New England Patriots, September 26, 1993
  - 35 points: vs. Buffalo Bills, October 8, 1978
- Most points in first half on road: 35 points: at Indianapolis Colts, November 3, 1985
- Most points in second half at home:
  - 38 points: vs. New England Patriots, October 27, 1968
  - 37 points: vs. New England Patriots, September 21, 1987
  - 30 points: vs. Miami Dolphins, October 23, 2000
- Most points in second half on road: 31 points: - (2 times)
  - at Detroit Lions, September 10, 2018
  - at Baltimore Colts, September 23, 1973
- Most points allowed in first quarter at home:
  - 21 points: vs. Miami Dolphins, December 7, 2025
  - 21 points: vs. Denver Broncos, October 28, 1973
  - 21 points: vs. Dallas Texans, November 11, 1962
  - 20 points: vs. St. Louis Cardinals, November 23, 1975
- Most points allowed in first quarter on road: 28 points: at Dallas Cowboys, December 4, 1971
- Most points allowed in second quarter at home:
  - 35 points: vs. New England Patriots, November 22, 2011
  - 28 points: vs. Indianapolis Colts, September 4, 2001
- Most points allowed in second quarter on road: 26 points: at Denver Broncos, December 3, 1967
- Most points allowed in third quarter at home: 21 points: (8 times)
  - vs. Buffalo Bills. November 14, 2021
  - vs. Miami Dolphins, December 17, 2016
  - vs. Miami Dolphins, November 1, 2009
  - vs. Arizona Cardinals, September 28, 2008
  - vs. Indianapolis Colts, November 10, 1991
  - vs. Miami Dolphins, November 12, 1989
  - vs. Miami Dolphins, September 12, 1982
  - vs. Houston Oilers, October 15, 1967
- Most points allowed in third quarter on road:
  - 28 points: at San Diego Chargers, November 5, 1961
  - 27 points: at Kansas City Chiefs, November 5, 1967
- Most points allowed in fourth quarter at home: 28 points: (2 times)
  - vs. Pittsburgh Steelers, December 13, 1986
  - vs. Houston Oilers, November 23, 1980
- Most points allowed in fourth quarter on road: 21 points: (7 times)
  - at Miami Dolphins, October 12, 2009
  - at Cincinnati Bengals, October 21, 2007
  - at New England Patriots, November 17, 1991
  - at Tampa Bay Buccaneers, December 16, 1984
  - at San Diego Chargers, October 31, 1971
  - at Boston Patriots, November 19, 1967
  - at Boston Patriots, September 8, 1963
- Most points allowed in first half at home: 35 points: (3 times)
  - vs. New England Patriots, December 28, 2025
  - vs. New England Patriots, November 22, 2011
  - vs. Houston Oilers, October 23, 1960
- Most points allowed in first half on road:
  - 41 points: at New England Patriots, October 29, 1978
  - 38 points: at Dallas Cowboys, December 4, 1971
- Most points allowed in second half at home: 35 points: vs. Arizona Cardinals, September 28, 2008
- Most points allowed in second half on road:
  - 41 points: at San Diego Chargers, November 5, 1961
  - 35 points: at Cincinnati Bengals, December 21, 1986
  - 34 points: at Los Angeles Chargers, December 18, 1960
  - 32 points: at Denver Broncos, November 22, 1962
- Most points by both teams in first quarter at home:
  - 35 points: New York Titans (14) vs. Dallas Texans (21), November 11, 1962
  - 31 points: New York Jets (17) vs. Tampa Bay Buccaneers (14), November 17, 1985
  - 28 points: New York Jets (7) vs. Miami Dolphins (21), December 7, 2025
  - 28 points: New York Jets (14) vs. Kansas City Chiefs (14), December 3, 2017
  - 28 points: New York Jets (14) vs. New England Patriots (14), October 2, 1977
  - 28 points: New York Jets (7) vs. Denver Broncos (21), October 28, 1973
- Most points by both teams in first quarter on road: 28 points: (4 times)
  - New York Jets (14) at Detroit Lions (14), December 8, 1991
  - New York Jets (7) at New England Patriots (21), October 29, 1978
  - New York Jets (0) at Dallas Cowboys (28), December 4, 1971
  - New York Jets (7) at Oakland Raiders (21), October 20, 1963
- Most points by both teams in second quarter at home:
  - 42 points: New York Jets (28) vs. Miami Dolphins (14), September 21, 1986
  - 38 points: New York Jets (3) vs. New England Patriots (35), November 22, 2011
  - 35 points: New York Titans (14) vs. Houston Oilers (21), October 23, 1960
- Most points by both teams in second quarter on road: 35 points: (2 times)
  - New York Titans (21) at Dallas Texans (14), December 17, 1961
  - New York Jets (14) at Miami Dolphins (21), September 3, 1995
- Most points by both teams in third quarter at home: 37 points: New York Jets (16) vs. Miami Dolphins (21), November 1, 2009
- Most points by both teams in third quarter on road:
  - 38 points: New York Jets (31) at Detroit Lions (7), September 10, 2018
  - 35 points: New York Jets (21) at Indianapolis Colts (14), November 16, 2003
- Most points by both teams in fourth quarter at home:
  - 42 points: New York Jets (28) vs. New England Patriots (14), October 27, 1968
  - 37 points: New York Jets (30) vs. Miami Dolphins (7), October 23, 2000
  - 36 points: New York Jets (22) vs. Arizona Cardinals (14), September 28, 2008
  - 35 points: New York Jets (21) vs. Houston Oilers (14), November 21, 1965
  - 35 points: New York Jets (7) vs. Houston Oilers (28), November 23, 1980
  - 35 points: New York Jets (7) vs. Pittsburgh Steelers (28), December 13, 1986
- Most points by both teams in fourth quarter on road: 35 points: (2 times)
  - New York Jets (14) at Tampa Bay Buccaneers (21), December 16, 1984
  - New York Jets (14) at Miami Dolphins (21), October 12, 2009
- Most points by both teams in first half at home:
  - 62 points: New York Jets (41) vs. Tampa Bay Buccaneers (21), November 17, 1985
  - 56 points: New York Titans (21) vs. Houston Oilers (35), October 23, 1960
  - 52 points: New York Jets (28) vs. Miami Dolphins (14), September 21, 1986
- Most points by both teams in first half on road:
  - 52 points: New York Titans (24) at Buffalo Bills (28), September 17, 1961
  - 52 points: New York Jets (28) at Los Angeles Chargers (24), December 24, 1967
  - 51 points: New York Jets (17) at Cleveland Browns (34), December 28, 2023
  - 49 points: New York Titans (21) at Dallas Texans (28), December 17, 1961
  - 48 points: New York Jets (13) at Oakland Raiders (35), October 20, 1963
- Most points by both teams in second half at home:
  - 58 points: New York Jets (37) vs. New England Patriots (21), September 21, 1987
  - 57 points: New York Jets (22) vs. Arizona Cardinals (35), September 28, 2008
  - 52 points: New York Jets (38) vs. New England Patriots (14), October 27, 1968
- Most points by both teams in second half on road:
  - 56 points: New York Titans (22) at Los Angeles Chargers (34), December 18, 1960
  - 54 points: New York Titans (22) at Denver Broncos, (32), November 22, 1962
  - 50 points: New York Jets (28) at San Diego Chargers (22), September 4, 1983
  - 49 points: New York Jets (20) at Oakland Raiders (29), November 17, 1968
  - 48 points: New York Jets (27) at Boston Patriots (21), September 22, 1968

=== Playoff player records ===
- Most games played: 12 games: Shaun Ellis, 2001-2010
- Most games started: 12 games: Shaun Ellis, 2001-2010
- Most interceptions in a game: 2 interceptions: - (5 times)
  - Ken Schroy, at Miami Dolphins, January 23, 1983
  - Lance Mehl, at Las Vegas Raiders, January 15, 1983
  - Johnny Lynn, at Cincinnati Bengals, January 9, 1983
  - Greg Buttle, vs. Buffalo Bills, December 27, 1981
  - Randy Beverly, at Baltimore Colts, January 12, 1969 (Super Bowl III)
- Most interceptions by a opponent in a game:
  - 3 interceptions: A. J. Duhe, at Miami Dolphins, January 23, 1983
  - 2 interceptions: Darrien Gordon, at Denver Broncos, January 17, 1999
  - 2 interceptions: Bubba McDowell, at Houston Oilers, December 29, 1991
  - 2 interceptions: Bill Simpson, vs. Buffalo Bills, December 27, 1981
  - 2 interceptions: Jim Marsalis, vs. Kansas City Chiefs, December 20, 1969

=== Playoff team records ===
- Most points in a game: 44 points: at Cincinnati Bengals, January 9, 1983
- Fewest points in a game: 0 points: at Miami Dolphins, January 23, 1983
- Most points allowed in a game: 38 points: at Oakland Raiders, January 12, 2002
- Fewest points allowed in a game: 0 points: vs. Indianapolis Colts, January 4, 2003
- Most points by both teams in a game: 62 points: New York Jets (24) at Oakland Raiders (38), January 12, 2002
- Fewest points by both teams in a game: 14 points: New York Jets (0) at Miami Dolphins (14), January 23, 1983
- Largest comeback: 11 points: at Cincinnati Bengals, January 9, 1983
- Most points in first quarter: 10 points: vs. Oakland Raiders, December 29, 1968
- Most points in second quarter: 17 points: - (3 times)
  - at Cincinnati Bengals, January 9, 1983
  - vs. Indianapolis Colts, January 4, 2003
  - at Indianapolis Colts, January 24, 2010
- Most points in third quarter: 14 points: at Jacksonville Jaguars, January 10, 1999
- Most points in fourth quarter: 21 points: at Cincinnati Bengals, January 9, 1983
- Most points in first half: 24 points: vs. Indianapolis Colts, January 4, 2003
- Most points in second half: 24 points: at Cincinnati Bengals, January 9, 1983
- Most points allowed in first half: 24 points: vs. Buffalo Bills, December 27, 1981
- Most points allowed in second half: 23 points: at Denver Broncos, January 17, 1999
- Most points allowed in first quarter: 17 points: vs. Buffalo Bills, December 27, 1981
- Most points allowed in second quarter: 17 points: at Pittsburgh Steelers, January 23, 2011
- Most points allowed in third quarter: 20 points: at Denver Broncos, January 17, 1999
- Most points allowed in fourth quarter: 22 points: at Oakland Raiders, January 12, 2002
- Most points by both teams in first half: 34 points: - (2 times)
  - New York Jets (10) vs. Buffalo Bills (24), December 27, 1981
  - New York Jets (20) at Cincinnati Bengals (14), January 9, 1983
- Most points by both teams in second half: 43 points: New York Jets (21) at Oakland Raiders (22), January 12, 2002
- Most points by both teams in first quarter: 17 points: - (2 times)
  - New York Jets (0) vs. Buffalo Bills (17), December 27, 1981
  - New York Jets (3) at Cincinnati Bengals (14), January 9, 1983
- Most points by both teams in second quarter: 30 points: New York Jets (17) at Indianapolis Colts (13), January 24, 2010
- Most points by both teams in third quarter: 27 points: New York Jets (7) at Denver Broncos (20), January 17, 1999
- Most points by both teams in fourth quarter: 36 points: New York Jets (14) at Oakland Raiders (22), January 12, 2002
- Fewest points by both teams in first half: 0 points: at Miami Dolphins, January 23, 1983
- Fewest points by both teams in second half: 3 points: New York Jets (0) at Houston Oilers (3), December 29, 1991

== Players ==
=== Current roster ===
New York Jets roster
**Quarterbacks (QB)**: 10 Cade Klubnik; 7 Geno Smith; **Running backs (RB)**: 0 Braelon Allen; 47 Andrew Beck FB; 32 Isaiah Davis; 20 Breece Hall; 3 Kene Nwangwu KR; **Wide receivers (WR)**: 11 Omar Cooper Jr.; 84 Malik McClain; 15 Adonai Mitchell; 17 Tim Patrick; 18 Isaiah Williams PR; 5 Garrett Wilson; **Tight ends (TE)**: 89 Jeremy Ruckert; 16 Kenyon Sadiq; 85 Mason Taylor; 86 Jelani Woods	**Offensive linemen (OL)**: 74 Olu Fashanu T; 70 Armand Membou T; 76 Blake Freeland T; 67 Jordan Meredith C; 71 Josh Myers C; 79 Chukwuma Okorafor T; 64 Dylan Parham G; 66 Joe Tippmann G; **Defensive linemen (DL)**: 91 Jowon Briggs DE; 96 Jack Heflin DE; 95 Darrell Jackson Jr. DT; 98 Payton Page DT; 97 Harrison Phillips DE	**Linebackers (LB)**: 31 David Bailey OLB; 56 Demario Davis MLB; 52 Kingsley Enagbare OLB; 48 Jaden Keller MLB; 92 Nate Lynn OLB; 9 Will McDonald IV OLB; 46 Joseph Ossai OLB; 50 Troy Reeder MLB; 44 Jamien Sherwood MLB; 49 Trevin Wallace MLB; **Defensive backs (DB)**: 6 Dane Belton SS; 2 Jarvis Brownlee Jr. CB; 29 Minkah Fitzpatrick FS; 27 Malachi Moore FS; 34 VJ Payne FS; 23 D'Angelo Ponds CB; 21 Brandon Stephens CB; 37 Qwan'tez Stiggers CB; 1 Azareye'h Thomas CB; 26 Nahshon Wright CB; **Special teams (ST)**: 42 Thomas Hennessy LS; 14 Austin McNamara P; 19 Jason Sanders K	**Practice squad**: 38 Mory Bamba CB; 75 Brant Banks T; 43 Quinton Bell OLB; 33 Jordan Clark CB; 53 Nick Dawkins C; 54 Paschal Ekeji OLB (IPP); 36 Al-Jay Henderson RB; -- Kohl Levao G; 4 Will Levis QB; 58 Isaiahh Loudermilk DE; 83 Joseph Manjack WR; 78 Amari McNeill DT; 65 Jimmy Morrissey C; 81 Jamaal Pritchett WR; 87 Sterling Shepard WR; 45 Mykal Walker MLB; 22 Samuel Womack CB; **Reserve**: 94 Tyler Baron OLB (PUP); 61 Max Mitchell T (IR); 72 Anez Cooper G (IR/DFR); 57 Kingsley Jonathan OLB (IR); 51 Francisco Mauigoa MLB (IR); 41 Marcelino McCrary-Ball MLB (IR); 55 Braiden McGregor OLB (IR); 93 David Onyemata DE (IR); 82 Arian Smith WR (IR); 99 T'Vondre Sweat DT (IR); 40 Chip Trayanum RB (IR) 53 active, 16 practice squad (1 IPP), 11 reserve As of November 17, 2026. Rookies in italics.; Roster; Depth chart; Transactions

=== Pro Football Hall of Famers ===
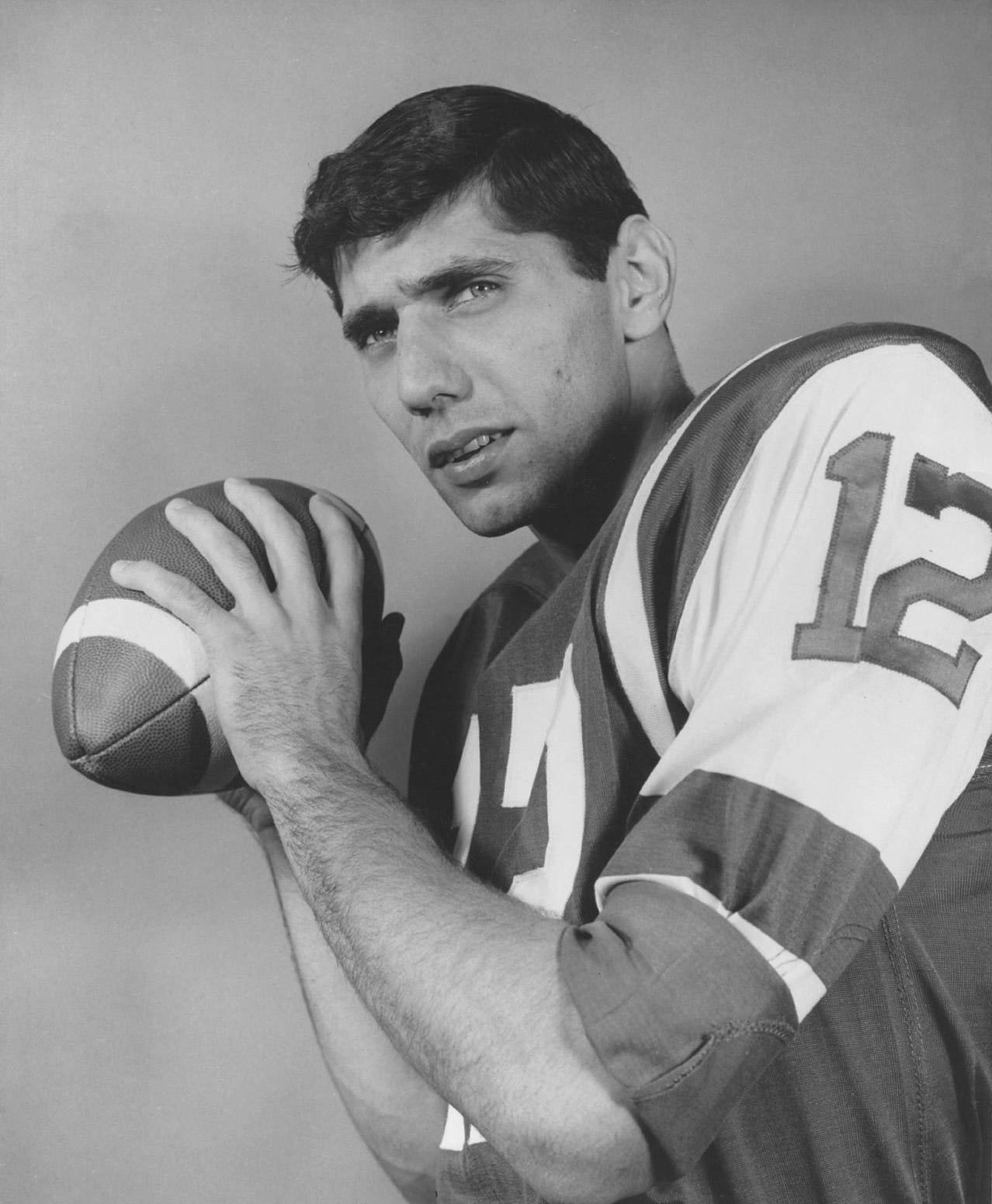
QB Joe Namath, Hall of Famer. His #12 was retired by the Jets.

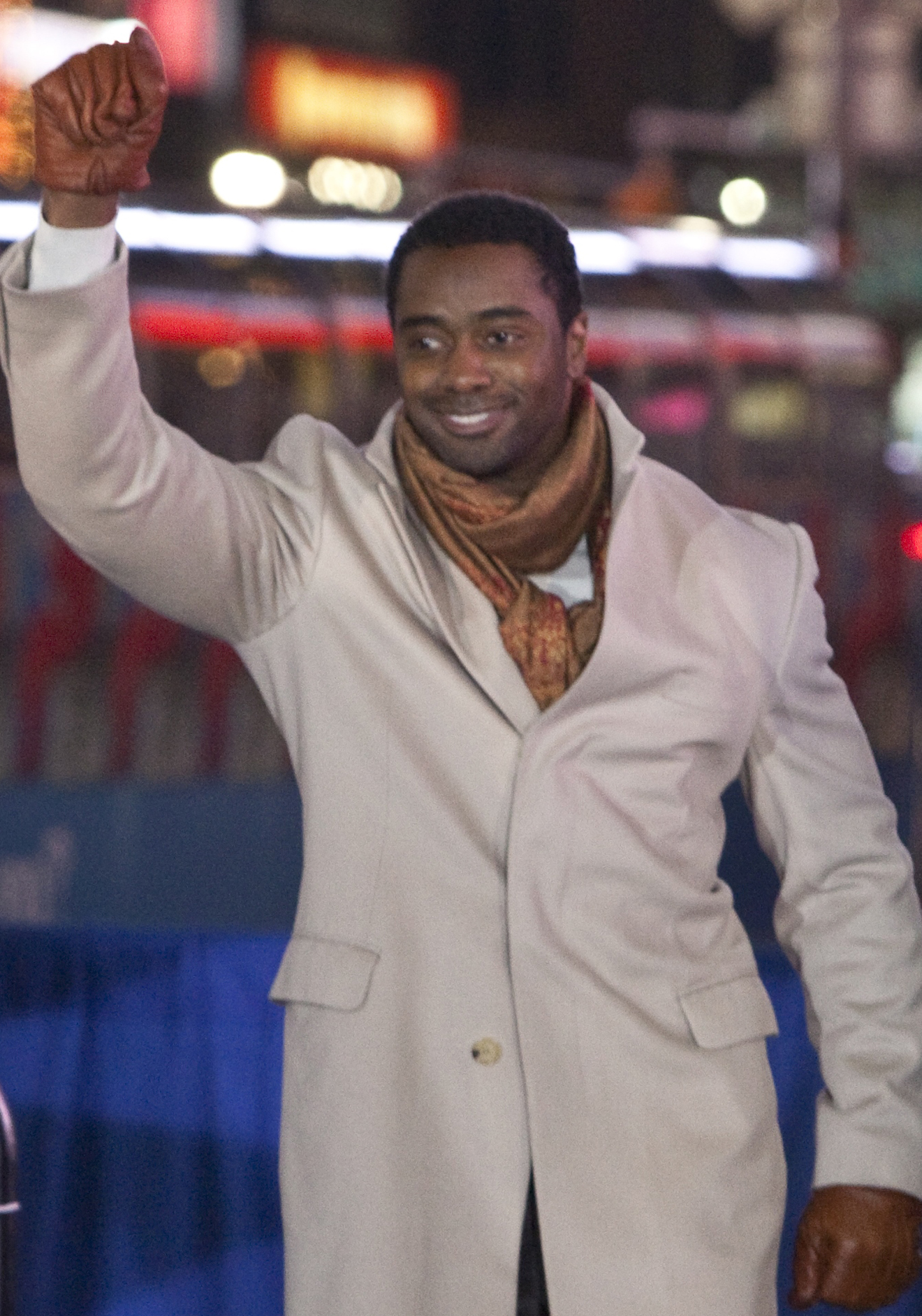
RB Curtis Martin (#28), Hall of Famer

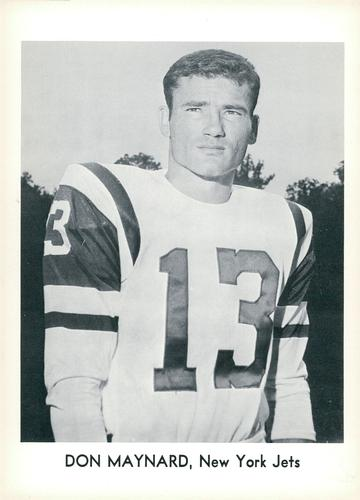
WR Don Maynard (#13), Hall of Famer

New York Jets in the Pro Football Hall of Fame
Players
No.	Name	Positions	Seasons	Inducted
12	**Joe Namath**	QB	1965–1976	1985
13	**Don Maynard**	WR	1960–1972	1987
44	John Riggins	RB	1971–1975	1992
42	Ronnie Lott	CB	1993–1994	2000
81	Art Monk	WR	1994	2008
28	**Curtis Martin**	RB	1998–2005	2012
4	Brett Favre	QB	2008	2016
99	Jason Taylor	DE	2010	2017
21	LaDainian Tomlinson	RB	2010–2011	2017
68	**Kevin Mawae**	C	1998–2005	2019
22/24	Ty Law	CB	2005, 2008	2019
22	Ed Reed	S	2013	2019
75	**Winston Hill**	OT	1963–1976	2020
27	Steve Atwater	S	1999	2020
65	Alan Faneca	G	2008–2009	2021
73	**Joe Klecko**	DE, DT	1977–1987	2023
24	**Darrelle Revis**	CB	2007–2012, 2015–2016	2023
Coaches and Contributors
Name		Positions	Seasons	Inducted
Sammy Baugh		Head coach	1960–1961	1963
Bulldog Turner		Head coach	1962	1966
**Weeb Ewbank**		Head coach	1963–1973	1978
Bill Parcells		Head coach GM	1997–1999; 1997–2000	2013
Ron Wolf		Director-Player Personnel	1990–1991	2015

Ewbank, Hill, Klecko, Martin, Mawae, Maynard, Namath, and Revis are recognized based upon their achievements with the Jets. Ewbank is also recognized based upon his achievements with the Baltimore Colts, coaching them to NFL championships in 1958 and 1959. Riggins is recognized primarily for his seasons with the Washington Redskins (1976–1979, 1981–1985), as is Monk (1980–1993), who won three Super Bowl championships with Washington. Lott is in the Hall of Fame primarily for his exploits as a member of the San Francisco 49ers. Baugh and Turner are recognized based upon their achievements as players with other teams, rather than their head coaching stints with the Jets. While Parcells reversed the fortunes of the Jets, he had major impact for the New York Giants, coaching them to two Super Bowl victories. Wolf only had a brief stint with the Jets between 1990 and 1991, while most of his major contributions occurred as an executive and player personnel director with the Oakland Raiders (1963–1974, 1979–1989), and later as General Manager of the Green Bay Packers (1991–2001). Favre only played one season as a member of the Jets in 2008, between most of his career with the Packers (1992–2007) and his last two NFL seasons with the Minnesota Vikings (2009–2010). Namath, Riggins, Klecko, and Revis are the only Hall of Famers who were drafted by the Jets.

=== Retired numbers ===
New York Jets retired numbers
No.	Player	Position	Years played	Retired	Ref.
**12**	Joe Namath	QB	1965–1976	October 14, 1985	
**13**	Don Maynard	WR	1960–1972		
**28**	Curtis Martin	RB	1998–2006	September 9, 2012	
**73**	Joe Klecko	DT	1977–1987	December 26, 2004	
**90**	Dennis Byrd	DE	1989–1992	October 28, 2012	
(Jacket)	Weeb Ewbank	Coach	1963–1973		

Additionally, the Jets have not reissued the #80 jersey of Wayne Chrebet (WR, 1995–2005) since he suffered a career-ending concussion in the 2005 season, and it has long been understood that it will not be worn again in the foreseeable future. Along similar lines, Byrd's #90 had not been reissued since he suffered a career-ending neck injury in 1992, and it had been understood long before his number was formally retired that no Jet would ever wear it again. Further, the Jets have not reissued #24 since the release of Darrelle Revis in 2016.

=== Ring of Honor ===
The Jets established a Ring of Honor on July 20, 2010, to commemorate former players. Each season, players will be nominated by an internal committee and then inducted into the Ring. There is no specific amount of honorees to be selected each year.

Elected to the Pro Football Hall of Fame

New York Jets Ring of Honor
No.	Name	Positions	Seasons	Inducted	No.	Name	Positions	Seasons	Inducted
12	Joe Namath	QB	1965–1976	2010	13	Don Maynard	WR	1960–1972	2010
28	Curtis Martin	RB	1998–2006	2010	75	Winston Hill	OT	1963–1976	2010
73	Joe Klecko	DT	1977–1987	2010	—	Weeb Ewbank	Coach	1963–1973	2010
60	Larry Grantham	LB	1960–1972	2011	81	Gerry Philbin	DE	1964–1972	2011
24	Freeman McNeil	RB	1981–1992	2011	88	Al Toon	WR	1985–1992	2011
85	Wesley Walker	WR	1977–1989	2012	99	Mark Gastineau	DE	1979–1988	2012
93	Marty Lyons	DT	1979–1989	2013	80	Wayne Chrebet	WR	1995–2005	2014
—	Leon Hess	Owner	1968–1999	2014	32	Emerson Boozer	RB	1966–1975	2015
41	Matt Snell	RB	1964–1972	2015	68	Kevin Mawae	C	1998–2005	2017
24	Darrelle Revis	CB	2007–2012	2022	74	Nick Mangold	C	2006–2016	2022
60	D'Brickashaw Ferguson	OT	2006–2015	2022					

=== American Football League All-Time Team ===
These Titans/Jets were picked for the American Football League All-Time Team on January 14, 1970. The first and second teams were determined by a panel of members of the AFL's Hall of Fame Board of Selectors: Bold indicates players elected to the Pro Football Hall of Fame.

First Team
**Joe Namath** (QB) • **Don Maynard** (WR) • Gerry Philbin (DE) • **Weeb Ewbank** (Coach)
Second Team
**Winston Hill** (T) • Larry Grantham (LB) • Jim Turner (PK) • Art Powell (WR) • Bob Talamini (G)

=== All-Time Four Decade Team ===
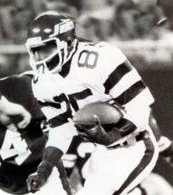
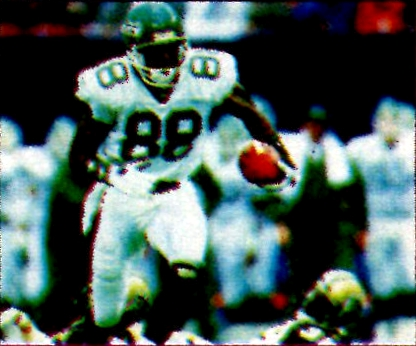
Wesley Walker (left) and Al Toon (right) were the Jets' primary wide receivers in the 1980s and rank among the best to play the position in franchise history.

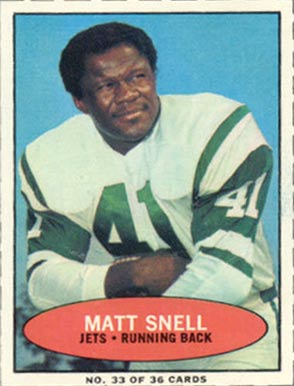
FB Matt Snell

New York announced their official All-Time Four Decade team in 2003, which was determined by the fans of the team. Bold indicates those elected to the Pro Football Hall of Fame.

Offense		Defense	
**Joe Namath**	QB	Mark Gastineau	DE
**Curtis Martin**	RB	John Abraham	DE
Matt Snell	FB	Marty Lyons	NT
**Don Maynard**	WR	**Joe Klecko**	NT
Al Toon	WR	Greg Buttle	LB
Wesley Walker	WR	Kyle Clifton	LB
Mickey Shuler	TE	Mo Lewis	LB
**Kevin Mawae**	C	James Hasty	CB
Jason Fabini	OT	Aaron Glenn	CB
Marvin Powell	OT	Victor Green	S
**Winston Hill**	OT	Bill Baird	S
Randy Rasmussen	G		
Jim Sweeney	G		
Special Teams
Bruce Harper (KR), Pat Leahy (PK), Chuck Ramsey (P)

=== Notable first round draft picks ===
Perhaps the most famous of the Jets' first round picks came in 1965 when they selected Alabama quarterback Joe Namath who boosted the Jets into the national spotlight with his boisterous personality and lifestyle. His physical talents on the field helped improve the Jets' fortunes, leading them to victory over the Baltimore Colts in Super Bowl III. Though injuries hampered the latter part of Namath's career, he is best remembered, according to former teammate John Dockery, as "a guy that came along and broke a lot of the conventions." Namath was inducted into the Hall of Fame in 1985.

The Jets have had a history of selecting players who turned out to be draft busts. Perhaps one of the most disappointing players in Jets history was running back Blair Thomas. Thomas, who averaged 5.4 yards (4.94 m) per carry at Penn State, was an intriguing prospect the Jets were interested in using to help their cumbersome offense. Confident in their decision, the Jets drafted Thomas with the second overall pick in 1990, expecting him to be a solid player for years to come. Thomas ran for only 620 yards in 1990, and failed to meet the high expectations. By the time Thomas left the team as an unrestricted free agent in 1993, he had rushed for 2,009 yards (1837.03 m) and only five touchdowns. The 2008 first round pick, outside linebacker Vernon Gholston, followed a similar path, failing to record a sack during his three-year tenure with the team.

Kyle Brady in 1995, who was drafted ahead of Warren Sapp, one of many disappointments during Rich Kotite's tenure as coach. However, in the same draft, the Jets did better with Hugh Douglas. Dewayne Robertson was a fourth overall selection in 2003 by the Jets. The defensive tackle out of Kentucky failed to make a big impact with the team. He accounted for 14.5 sacks in his 5 seasons with the team, a rather underwhelming player given what the Jets had hoped for. At quarterback, the Jets found themselves dealing with the consequences of drafting University of Alabama quarterback Richard Todd in 1976. In his tenure with the Jets, he threw for more interceptions than he did touchdowns. In the 1982 season, the Jets played vs the Miami Dolphins in the AFC Championship Game. Todd threw for five interceptions and the Jets lost the game. A year later, Todd would be traded to the New Orleans Saints. The most recent bust, Dee Milliner, was drafted by the team in 2013. Milliner played his college career at the University of Alabama and had high expectations after being drafted. Lasting just 3 years with the team, Milliner's career was plagued by injuries and inconsistency, recording only 3 interceptions during his brief Jets career.

In the 2013 and 2014 seasons, one of the Jets' strongest units was their defensive line, manned by first round selections Muhammad Wilkerson (2011) and Sheldon Richardson (2013). In 2013, Wilkerson ended the season with 10.5 sacks, matching the last Jets player to have more than 10 sacks in a single season, John Abraham in 2005. Also that year, Richardson was honored with an award from the AP for Defensive Rookie of the Year. The Jets' run defense was stout with all three in the line up, finishing fifth as a team in rushing yards allowed in 2014.

In the 2017 NFL draft, the Jets selected Jamal Adams with the sixth overall pick out of LSU. Adams had a strong start to his early career, making the Pro Bowl in the 2018 season and winning the Defensive MVP Award alongside Kansas City Chiefs' quarterback Patrick Mahomes as the Offensive MVP.

In the 2019 NFL draft, the Jets selected Quinnen Williams from Alabama with the third overall pick. Williams had been touted as the best overall prospect leading up to the draft, being compared to defensive tackle superstar Aaron Donald. Williams ended up being the final first round pick by then general manager Mike Maccagnan, who was fired shortly after the draft. Williams struggled in his rookie year with injuries and inconsistent play, but showed promise as a defensive anchor in his 2020 season: he recorded 7.0 sacks and 55 total tackles before being added to the Injured Reserved list in the final weeks of the season.

In the 2022 NFL draft, the Jets made three selections in the first round. The Jets selected cornerback Sauce Gardner from the University of Cincinnati fourth overall. He made the 2022 All-Pro Team as a rookie, the first to do so at his position since Ronnie Lott in 1981. The second of their three first round picks was wide receiver Garrett Wilson from Ohio State, who was selected 10th overall. The Jets third and final selection in the first round was defensive end Jermaine Johnson II of Florida State University.

== Coaches and staff ==
=== Head coaches ===
The Jets have had 21 head coaches in their history coach at least one game for the franchise. 18 of their head coaches have served in a full-time role.

=== Current staff ===
New York Jets staff
Front office: Owner/chairman/CEO – Woody Johnson; Vice chairman – Christopher Johnson; President – Hymie Elhai; Executive vice president/COO – Brian Friedman; General manager – Darren Mougey; Senior director of football operations – Dan Zbojovsky; Senior director of football administration – Nick Sabella; Senior personnel/special projects – Jon Carr, TJ McCreight, Adam Engroff; Director of player personnel – Robbie Paton; Director of pro scouting – Evan Ardoin; Director of college scouting – Jay Mandolesi; Director, football analytics and strategy – Sean Clement; Player personnel research and analytics – Brian Shields; Senior football advisor – Rick Spielman; Manager, personnel operations - Destiny Rodriguez; Coordinator, Scouting strategy – Donovan Doyle; Head coaches: Head coach – Aaron Glenn; Offensive coaches: Offensive coordinator – Frank Reich; Pass game coordinator – Seth Ryan; Quarterbacks – Bill Musgrave; Running backs – Nic McKissic-Luke; Wide receivers – Shawn Jefferson; Tight ends – Alfredo Roberts; Offensive line – Steve Heiden; Assistant offensive line – Al Netter; Assistant offensive line – Brian Natkin; Offensive assistant/assistant quarterbacks – Thomas Merkle; Offensive assistant – Matthew Sargent; Offensive assistant – Junior Taylor	Defensive coaches: Defensive coordinator – Brian Duker; Defensive line – Karl Dunbar; Assistant defensive line – Cameron Davis; Linebackers – Ben Bolling; Assistant linebackers – Nathaniel Willingham; Defensive backs/pass game coordinator – Chris Harris; Safeties – Ryan Slowik; Defensive assistant/nickels – Ronald Booker; Defensive assistant – Collin Bauer; Special teams coaches: Special teams coordinator – Chris Banjo; Special teams assistant – Kevin O'Dea; Support staff: Game management – Jon Berger; Coordinator, Coaching operations – Madilyn Johnson; Strength and conditioning: Head strength and conditioning – Corey Smith; Assistant strength and conditioning – Brian Johnson; Assistant strength and conditioning – Thomas Myslinski; → Coaching staff → Front office → More NFL staffs

Preceded by Oakland Raiders	AFL champions 1968	Succeeded by Kansas City Chiefs
Preceded by Green Bay Packers	Super Bowl champions 1968 (III)	Succeeded by Kansas City Chiefs
