= Marty Lyons =

American football player (born 1957)

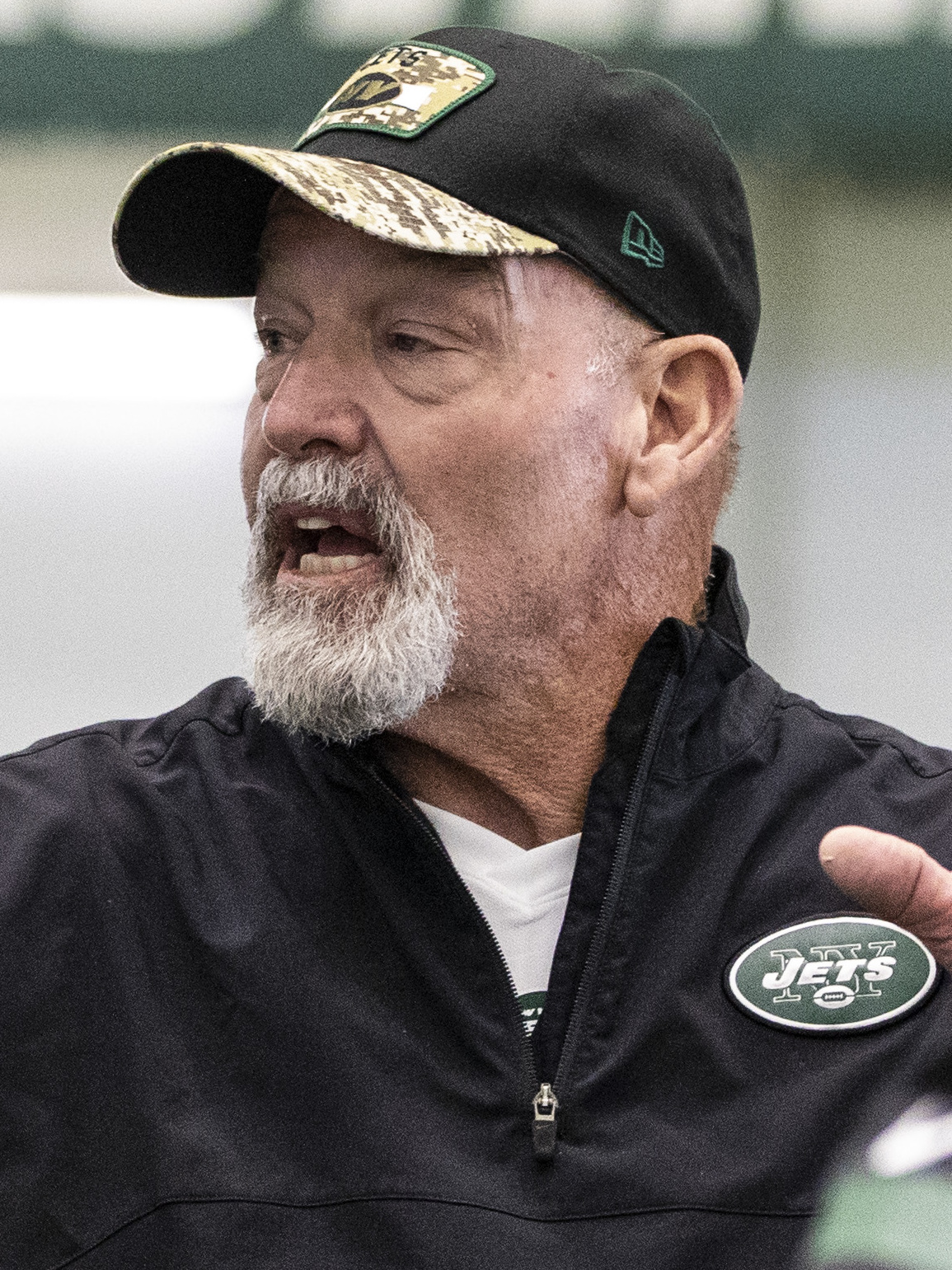
- Lyons in 2023

No. 93
- Positions: Defensive tackle, defensive end

Personal information
- Born: January 15, 1957 (age 69); Takoma Park, Maryland, U.S.
- Listed height: 6 ft 5 in (1.96 m)
- Listed weight: 269 lb (122 kg)

Career information
- High school: St. Petersburg Catholic (St. Petersburg, Florida)
- College: Alabama
- NFL draft: 1979: 1st round, 14th overall pick

Career history
- New York Jets (1979–1990)

Awards and highlights
- NFL Man of the Year (1984); New York Jets Ring of Honor; National champion (1978); Consensus All-American (1978); SEC Defensive Player of the Year (1978); First-team All-SEC (1978); Second-team All-SEC (1977)

Career NFL statistics
- Games played: 147
- Sacks: 29.0
- Fumble recoveries: 8
- Safeties: 2
- Stats at Pro Football Reference
- College Football Hall of Fame

Martin Anthony Lyons (born January 15, 1957) is an American former professional football defensive tackle and defensive end who played in the National Football League (NFL) for 12 seasons with the New York Jets. Lyons played college football for the Alabama Crimson Tide, earning consensus All-American honors and SEC Defensive Player of the Year in 1978 en route to a victory in the 1979 Sugar Bowl. Lyons was selected by the Jets in the first round of the 1979 NFL draft and was a member of the New York Sack Exchange defense. Following his playing career, he spent 22 years as a radio analyst for the Jets from 2002 to 2023. He was inducted to the College Football Hall of Fame in 2011.

== Early life ==
Lyons grew up in Pinellas Park, Florida and attended St. Petersburg Catholic High School.

== College career ==
Lyons attended the University of Alabama, where he played for coach Bear Bryant's Alabama Crimson Tide football team from 1975 to 1978. At Alabama, he had 202 tackles, 6 fumbles forced and 4 recovered. As a senior in 1978, he was recognized as a consensus first-team All-American, and helped lead the Crimson Tide to a National Championship in 1978. He was a key player in the set of fourth quarter plays known as "The Goal Line Stand" in the 1979 Sugar Bowl. It was Lyons that delivered what would become a famous line amongst Alabama fans just before the fourth-down play of the sequence. When asked by Penn State quarterback Chuck Fusina how far the ball was from the goal line, Lyons replied, "'Bout a foot. You better pass." Alabama was 31-5 during his years as a player.

== Professional career ==
Lyons was drafted by the New York Jets in the first round (14th overall pick) of the 1979 NFL Draft. The following round, the Jets selected East Central Oklahoma State defensive end Mark Gastineau.

The two joined Joe Klecko and Abdul Salaam on the Jets' defensive line to form one of the top defensive lines in the NFL, known as the "New York Sack Exchange." The four combined for 66 sacks in 1981 which helped propel the Jets to their first playoff berth since 1969. In November 1981, Salaam, Gastineau, Klecko and Lyons were invited to ring the ceremonial opening bell at the New York Stock Exchange that served as the inspiration for their nickname.

The Jets made the playoffs again in 1982, 1985 and 1986 during Lyons' tenure with the team. In 1982, they made it as far as the AFC Championship Game, losing 14–0 to the Miami Dolphins.

Lyons was involved in one of the best-known plays in NFL lore. During the Jets' 14–13 victory over the Buffalo Bills at the Meadowlands on October 5, 1986, Lyons attempted to sack Buffalo quarterback Jim Kelly then started to punch him repeatedly after the ball was thrown for an incompletion. Lyons was flagged for a personal foul by referee Ben Dreith for "giving him the business." Dreith mistakenly assessed the foul against number 99, which was Gastineau's number, instead of calling Lyons' number 93.

Lyons missed playing time during the 1987 season when his wife, Kelly and son, Martin Anthony "Rocky" Lyons Jr., were involved in a serious traffic incident in Alabama. Later the same season, during a Monday Night Football game, Lyons blocked former Alabama teammate and Hall of Famer Dwight Stephenson in what Dolphins players and coaches labeled a 'cheap shot' that ended his career. Dwight Stephenson himself claimed it was a clean block, explaining that he caught his leg as he went down and never blamed Lyons for the injury.

Seasons	Games	Starts	Sacks	FR	Yds	Sfty
12	147	135	45	8	10	2

== Broadcasting career ==
In 2002, Lyons joined the New York Jets radio network, spending 22 seasons broadcasting games alongside Bob Wischusen. He retired following the 2023 season and moved into what the team called an "ambassador role".

== Personal life ==
While a player with the Jets, a series of events — the birth of his eldest son, the passing of his father, and the passing of a little boy to whom Lyons had been a Big Brother — inspired him to establish the Marty Lyons Foundation to work with terminally ill children, providing them wishes. He won the Walter Payton Man of the Year Award in 1984 as a result of that work. In December 2011, Lyons was honored by the Heisman Trust as the recipient of the sixth annual Heisman Humanitarian Award for his work with his Foundation.

Lyons currently is the chairman of the Marty Lyons Foundation. He has been enshrined in the State of Alabama Hall of Fame (2000), Long Island's Suffolk Sports Hall of Fame (2001) and Nassau County Sports Hall of Fame (2002), Maryland Sports Hall of Fame (2004), the Tampa Bay Sports Club Hall of Fame (2007), and the College Football Hall of Fame (2011).

Lyons received his bachelor's degree from the University of Alabama during winter commencement exercises on December 10, 2016.

Lyons and his wife, Christine, have three children named Jesse, Megan, and Lucas. Rocky, his only child from his first marriage, is a physician in Wetumpka, Alabama.
