= Logos and uniforms of the New York Jets =

New York Jets primary logo

New York Jets secondary logo

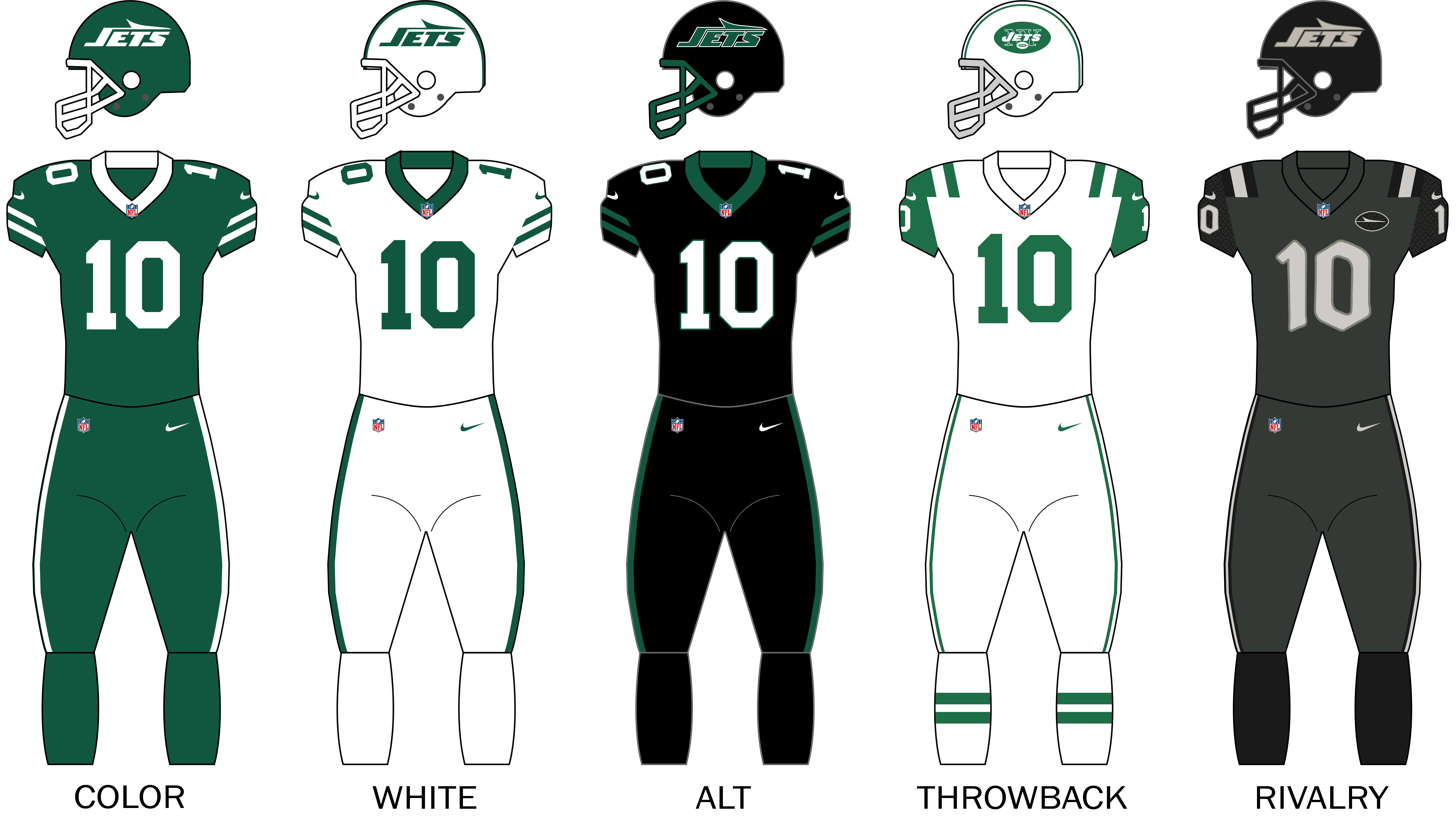
New York Jets uniforms

The National Football League (NFL)'s New York Jets began play in 1960 as the Titans of New York, a charter member of the American Football League (AFL). The original Titans wore plain, simple navy blue and gold uniforms with no logos, adding stripes in 1961. When the Titans became the Jets in 1963 the uniforms were redesigned and the team colors changed to green and white, which they have remained ever since, although the franchise has used different shades of green and has at times used black as a third/trim color.

For most of their history, the Jets had white helmets with green striping and logos, green and white jerseys with color-inverted sleeves and shoulder stripes, and white pants with two green stripes down each side. Their first helmet logo was a green cartoon jet plane with the word "JETS" in thick white sans-serif italics along the fuselage, then the team adopted a football-shaped logo with outlined "NY" initials behind the "JETS" wordmark and a miniature football at bottom center, first in white with a green outline and details, then in green with white details.

The team switched to green helmets and a simpler uniform design in 1978, replacing the football-shaped logo with a modernized wordmark, then in 1990 added black trim and green pants. In 1998 the team reverted to its "classic" look, with an updated version of the prior logo, and replaced the traditional kelly green with a darker hunter green. A 2019 redesign saw the team revert to green helmets and reincorporate black into the color scheme, along with a new medium shade of green that the franchise called "Gotham Green," modified primary and secondary logos, tapered striping on the jerseys and pants, a new sans-serif numeral font, a chest wordmark, and for the first time in team history, a black alternate uniform.

In 2024 the Jets introduced new uniforms based on their 1978–89 design, carrying over the "Gotham Green" shade (renaming it "Legacy Green") and metallic-finish helmet shells. The primary uniform consists of green and white jerseys and pants with contrasting numerals, stripes, and collars; the jerseys have two horizontal parallel stripes on the sleeves, while the pants have a single vertical stripe on each side, and are worn with green or white socks. The helmets have white facemasks and a modified version of the 1978–89 wordmark logo on each side, consisting of the word "JETS" in stylized italic lettering with a silhouette of a generic modern jet airplane extending horizontally to the right from the top of the "J" above the other letters. With this redesign the Jets again become the only team in the NFL whose primary uniform consists of only two colors.

The team also has a black alternate uniform with white numerals outlined in green, green stripes and collars, black socks, and a matte-black alternate helmet with a metallic-green facemask and the primary wordmark in green outlined in white, and a "Classic" alternate uniform combining elements of the 1963–77 and 1998–2018 designs. In 2025 the Jets added a "Rivalries" design as part of a program initiated by the NFL and Nike; these uniforms are a slightly green-tinted shade of black with silver numerals outlined in grey, black and grey stripes on the shoulders and pants seams, and black sleeves with a manhole-cover pattern; the helmets are matte-black with black facemasks and grey-outlined silver logos. The Jets added another alternate helmet for 2026 with a white shell, green primary-logo decal, green center stripe, and white facemask.

== History of the Jets' logos and uniforms ==
=== 1960–1962: Titans of New York ===
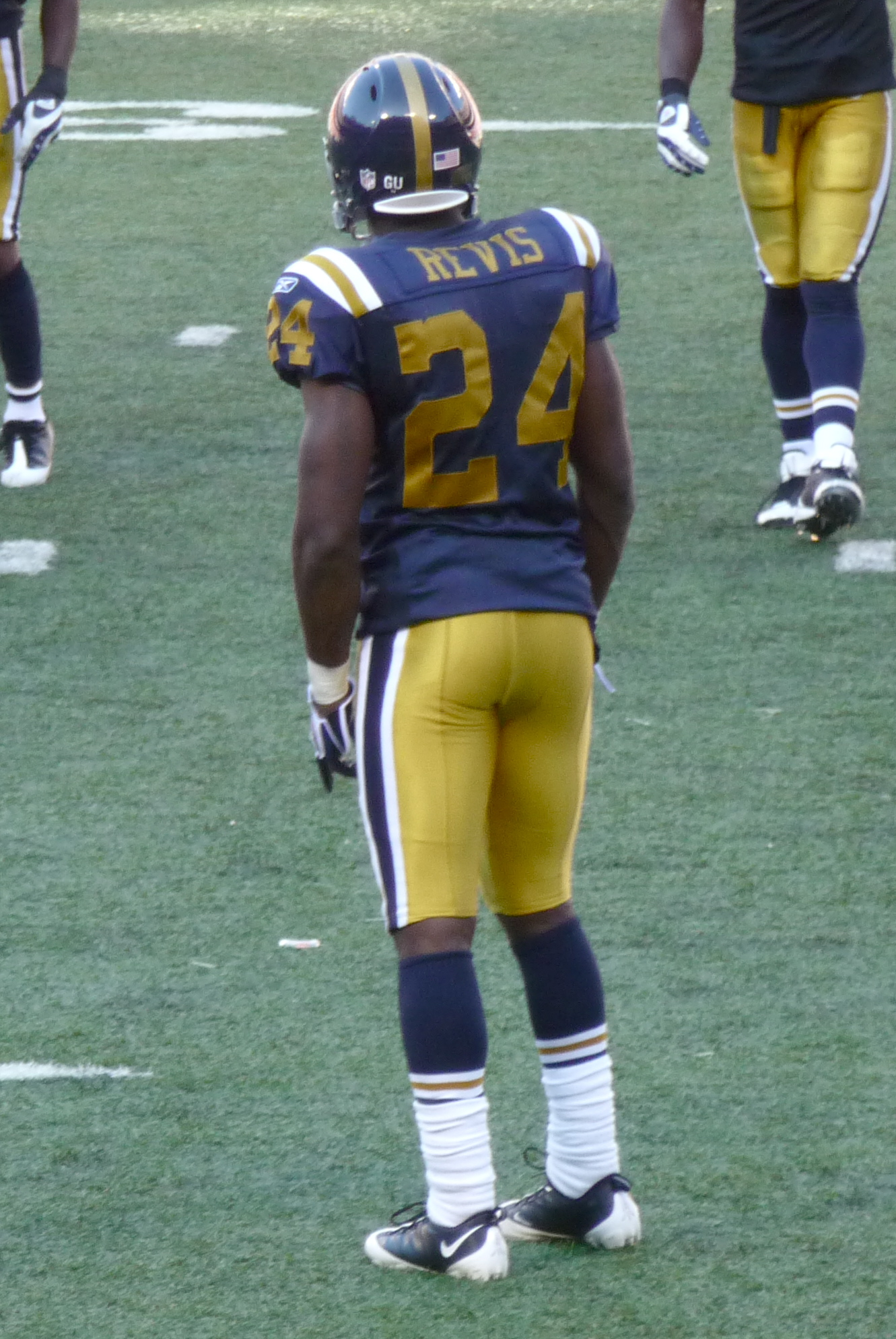
Cornerback Darrelle Revis wearing the New York Titans throwback uniform in 2008. This design combined the original shade of gold from 1960 with the 1961–62 striping modifications.

The original Titans of New York wore navy blue jerseys with old gold serifed block numerals, gold pants with two parallel blue stripes on each side, and navy blue helmets with a single gold stripe down the center and no logo decals. The white jerseys had navy blue numerals. The designs resembled those of Notre Dame due to an affinity the franchise's original principal owner, Harry Wismer, had for the Fighting Irish; Wismer, who was considered a sportscasting pioneer, broadcast replays of Notre Dame football games prior to owning the Titans. In 1961 the Titans added player names to the back of the jerseys above the numerals along with UCLA-style shoulder stripes (white and gold on the blue jerseys, navy blue and gold on the white jerseys), changed the pants striping to a blue stripe flanked by white stripes, and employed a somewhat brighter shade of gold.

The Titans had a primary logo that did not appear on the uniform, consisting of the word "TITANS" in thick gold italic block lettering outlined in navy blue with the first "T" elongated, a small "THE" above and "OF NEW YORK" below in navy blue, spelling out "THE TITANS OF NEW YORK"; to the left was a monochromatic image of a football player in navy blue, facing the viewer, in motion with arms and shoulders raised in a tackling pose.

=== 1963–1977: Kelly green and white ===
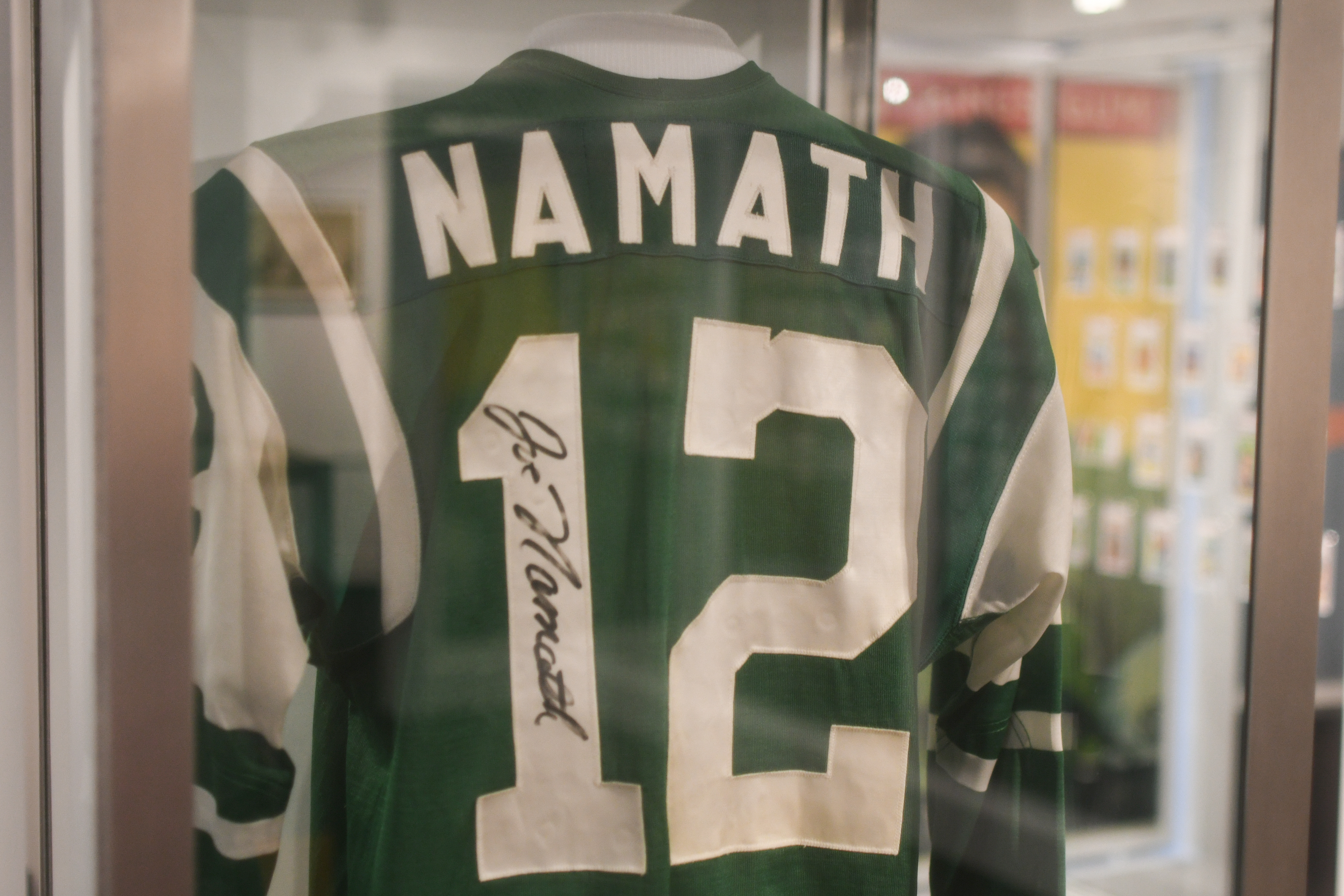
The original Jets jerseys had color-inverted ¾-length sleeves with thick stripes above and below the TV numerals; by the mid-1970s the sleeves were shorter and the shoulder stripes thinner. The Jets used this serifed block numeral font from 1963-67 before switching to thinner numerals with fewer serifs and a diagonal downstroke on the "2" in 1968.

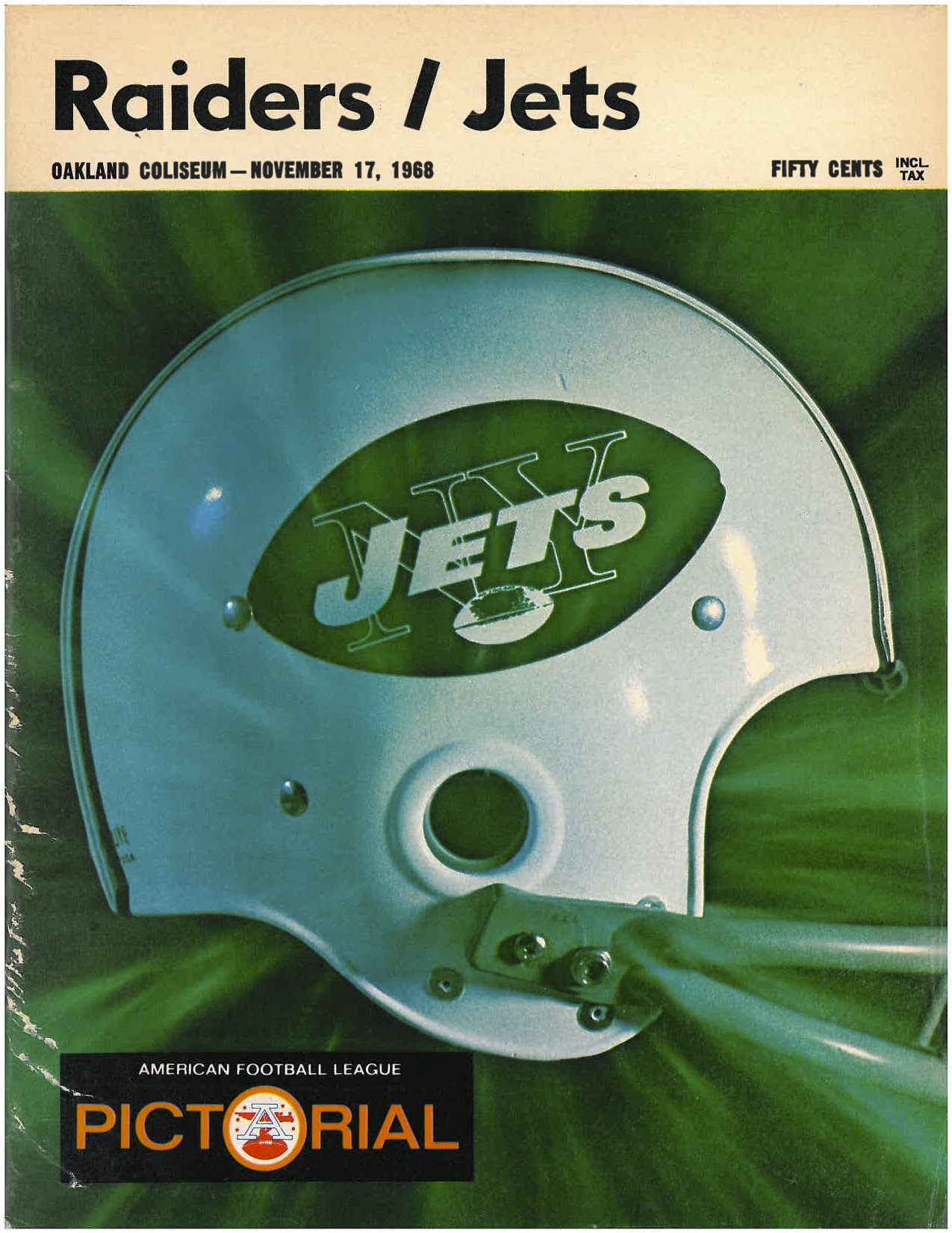
1968 game program showing the 1965–77 helmet and primary logo design. The logo decal was set horizontally beginning in 1972.

When a Sonny Werblin-led syndicate purchased the team prior to the 1963 season and renamed it the Jets, the entire uniform was redesigned and replaced. Navy and gold were abandoned in favor of kelly green and white; white pants and green or white jerseys with contrasting stripes, numerals, and lettering. Werblin had embraced those colors because he was born on Saint Patrick's Day; his business partner and eventual majority owner Leon Hess later co-opted the Jets colors for Amerada Hess when he took control of that company later in the decade.

The new Jets jersey sleeves were color-inverted (i.e., the green jerseys had white sleeves and vice versa) from shoulder to elbow, with thick stripes above and below the TV numerals which appeared on the upper arm. The pants were white with two parallel green stripes on each side, and the socks were green above the ankle with two parallel white stripes around the calf. The new helmets were white with a single green stripe down the center; the logo decal on each side, which first appeared in the team's fifth regular-season game, was a silhouette of a jet airplane in green, in profile with wings showing, the nose pointed toward the front of the helmet and the word "JETS" in thick white sans-serif italics along the fuselage.

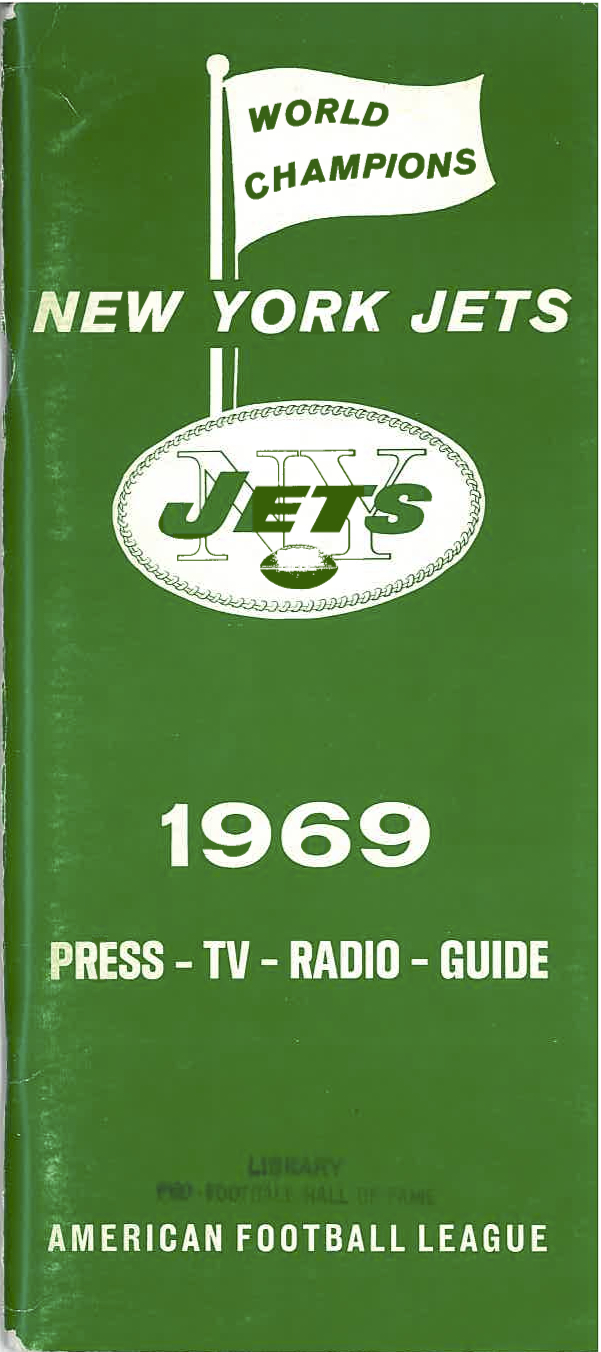
1969 Jets Media Guide showing the "stitched" oval secondary logo used in the 1960s and early '70s on game programs, tickets, and other publications; the 1964 helmet logo was similar, but not identical.

The Jets also adopted a secondary logo in 1963, a white oval outlined with green "stitches," the word "JETS" in thick green sans-serif italics centered over the initials "NY" in thin outlined serif lettering, and a green football with a white "shine" on the upper half of it at bottom center. In 1964 the Jets changed their helmet design, replacing the single green center stripe with two parallel stripes, and the jet-plane decals with something similar to the oval logo but football-shaped with a solid green outline, no "stitches," slightly different lettering, and a solid green miniature football. The 1964 logo decals were difficult to see from a distance (or on television), so the colors were reversed and the decals enlarged in 1965; the details, now rendered in white on a green football-shaped field, closely matched those of the 1963 oval logo, including the "shine" on the miniature football. The decals were set on each side of the helmet angled upward toward the front.

From 1963-67 the Jets' jerseys used the serifed block numeral font carried over from the Titans, then in 1968 adopted thinner numerals with fewer serifs and a diagonal downstroke on the numeral "2". The Jets continued to use this style through 1973, although in 1972 the team adopted a second set of jerseys for warm-weather games, made by the Champion sportswear company of Rochester, New York, with shorter sleeves and a slightly different numeral font with no serif on the "2" and a curved downstroke on the "7", along with wider, rounded lettering for the players' names. Also in 1972, the Jets began setting the helmet logo decals horizontally. From 1974-77 all Jets jerseys used the Champion numeral font, although there were still variations in the name lettering; serifed lettering began to appear in 1976. The white stripes on the socks were eliminated in 1975.

In the early 1970s, before the warm-weather jerseys were adopted, the Jets occasionally wore preseason/practice jerseys in early-season road games. On September 27, 1970 against the Boston Patriots the Jets wore plain white jerseys with no stripes and green TV numerals on the sleeves. For the first four games of 1971, the Jets wore white jerseys with green sleeves and color-inverted TV numerals but no green stripes on the shoulders above them; the regular white jerseys did not appear until the Jets wore them at home on November 7 against the Kansas City Chiefs. This was the second time the Jets wore white jerseys at home in the regular season; the first was November 29, 1970 against the Minnesota Vikings. They would do so again, once per season, in 1972, 1974 and 1975.

On October 12, 1969, six Jets players had their jerseys stolen from their locker room at Nippert Stadium in Cincinnati prior to a game against the Bengals, and wore white Bengals jerseys (with black numerals and black and orange stripes on the sleeves) in that game. Later that season, quarterback Joe Namath's jersey was stolen before the team's December 6 game at Houston against the Oilers, so Namath played the game in a plain white practice jersey with green numerals and no stripes.

=== 1978–1997: Green helmets and modern logo ===
1978–97 Jets wordmark and primary logo. A thin black outline was added in 1990.

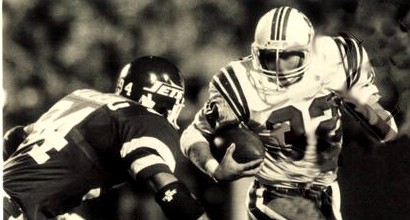
Defensive lineman Rusty Guilbeau (left) wearing the 1978–89 uniform. Note the green helmet, wordmark decal and modified shoulder/sleeve design.

The Jets' first major design change was made for the 1978 season. The kelly green and white color scheme was retained; the new helmets were solid green with white facemasks, and a stylized "JETS" wordmark in white on each side. The mark featured angular italic lettering and a silhouette of a generic modern jet airplane in profile extending horizontally to the right from the top of the "J" above the "ETS". The jerseys simplified the sleeve design, replacing it with two thick parallel stripes and moving the TV numerals to the upper shoulders (where they were no longer color-inverted), enlarging them slightly; the pants now had a single green stripe on the seams. The Champion numeral font was carried over, with both serif and sans-serif lettering for player names on the back of the jerseys in 1978 and 1979, then sans-serif only beginning in 1980.

From 1985–89, the Jets wore their white jerseys at home as well as on the road; the green jerseys appeared only on rare occasions in road games when the host team wore white. Also, during this time the Jets again used two slightly different jersey styles for warm- and cold-weather games, although unlike 1972-73 the two styles would often appear on the field at the same time. These were mainly distinguishable by the sleeve stripes, and by the numerals "2" and "7". The warm-weather jerseys (made by Champion) had the thick sleeve stripes introduced in 1978 and the numeral font that the Jets had been using since 1972, whereas the cold-weather jerseys (made by Sand-Knit) had thin sleeve stripes and standard block numerals; the "2" had a squared downstroke, and the "7" had a straight diagonal downstroke with serif. The Sand-Knit jerseys also had slightly-smaller TV numerals, and thin block lettering for the players' names.

In 1990, the Jets modified this design by adding thin black outlines to the numerals, lettering, stripes and helmet decals, and changing the facemasks from white to black. The team reverted to using the green jersey as its primary home uniform, reintroduced the white stripes on the socks, and added a set of green pants to be worn with the white jerseys along with white socks that had two parallel green stripes around the calf. In 1995, player names on the backs of the jerseys were changed from black-outlined sans-serif lettering to one-color serif lettering, and all jerseys employed the Champion numeral font. The team occasionally wore white pants and standard socks with the white jerseys in 1995 and 1996, then did so for all games in 1997. The 1997 jerseys, made by Starter, replaced the Champion font with standard block numerals.

=== 1998–2018: Retro update ===
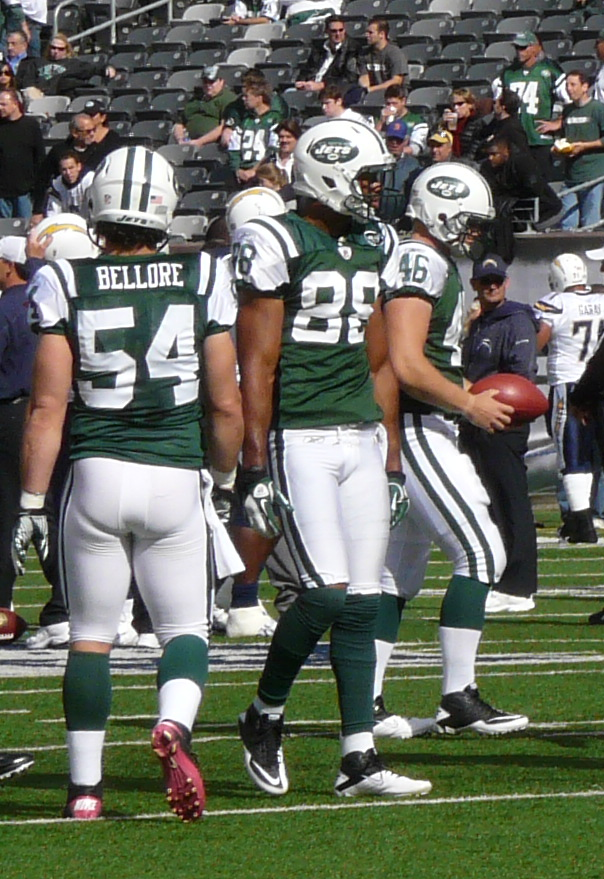
This photo from 2011 shows the 1998–2018 Jets uniform, which was generally consistent during that time with some variations in tailoring and coloration. Note the shoulder inserts designed to simulate the 1963–77 striping pattern on the sleeves.

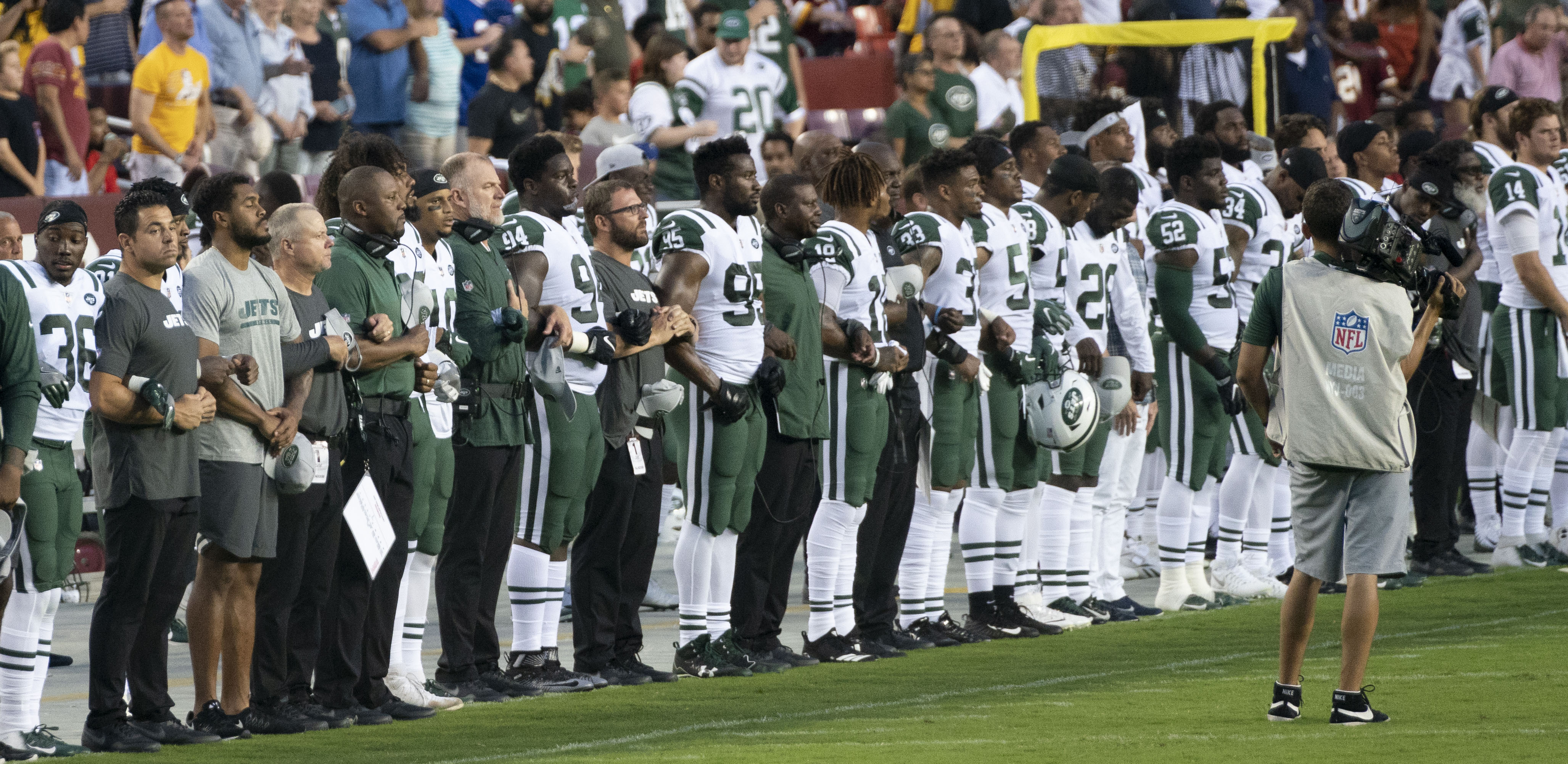
The Jets added green pants and white socks (shown here in 2018) in 2002.

Upon taking over as administrator and head coach in 1997, Bill Parcells took the initiative and began the process of re-forming the team's identity, which included redesigning the team's uniforms, logos and wordmarks for the 1998 season to effectively restore its classic AFL look. The team changed its primary uniform color from the bright kelly green to the darker hunter green, abandoned black as a trim color, and replaced the stylized "JETS" wordmark with a modified version of the 1965–77 logo, this one oval rather than football-shaped with starker lines defining the lettering and the miniature football having laces in the center instead of a "shine" on the upper half. The helmets reverted to white with two parallel green stripes down the center, the new primary logo decal on each side, and new green facemasks. The jerseys and pants also resembled the 1963–77 uniforms, with alternating shoulder stripes, color-inverted sleeves and TV numerals, and two green parallel stripes on the pants seams. The block numerals and serif lettering were carried over from the previous set, and the new primary logo was also added to the jersey front, by the player's left shoulder.

This uniform remained largely unchanged through 2018, save for some variations in coloration and shoulder/sleeve tailoring, and the occasional commemorative patch. The 1998 and 1999 jerseys (made by Starter and Nike, respectively) had full shoulder loops, but in 2000 Nike began truncating the shoulder stripes so that the top stripe no longer encircled the shoulder but rather arched over the top of it. This continued when Reebok took over league-wide in 2001; the shoulder stripes were moved up to appear vertical or near-vertical, increasing the inverted-color space on the sleeves. When Nike took over league-wide in 2012 the shoulder stripes were moved slightly downward to a more angled orientation, and the color green on the jersey fabric became muted and inconsistent.

In 2002, the team introduced a set of green pants with two parallel white stripes on each side, along with white socks with green stripes resembling those used with the green pants from 1990–97. The green pants were worn occasionally with both the green and white jerseys through 2018. Although the white socks were meant to be worn with the green pants, the team tended to use them whenever the white jerseys were worn, with either green or white pants.

=== 2019–2023: "Take Flight" ===
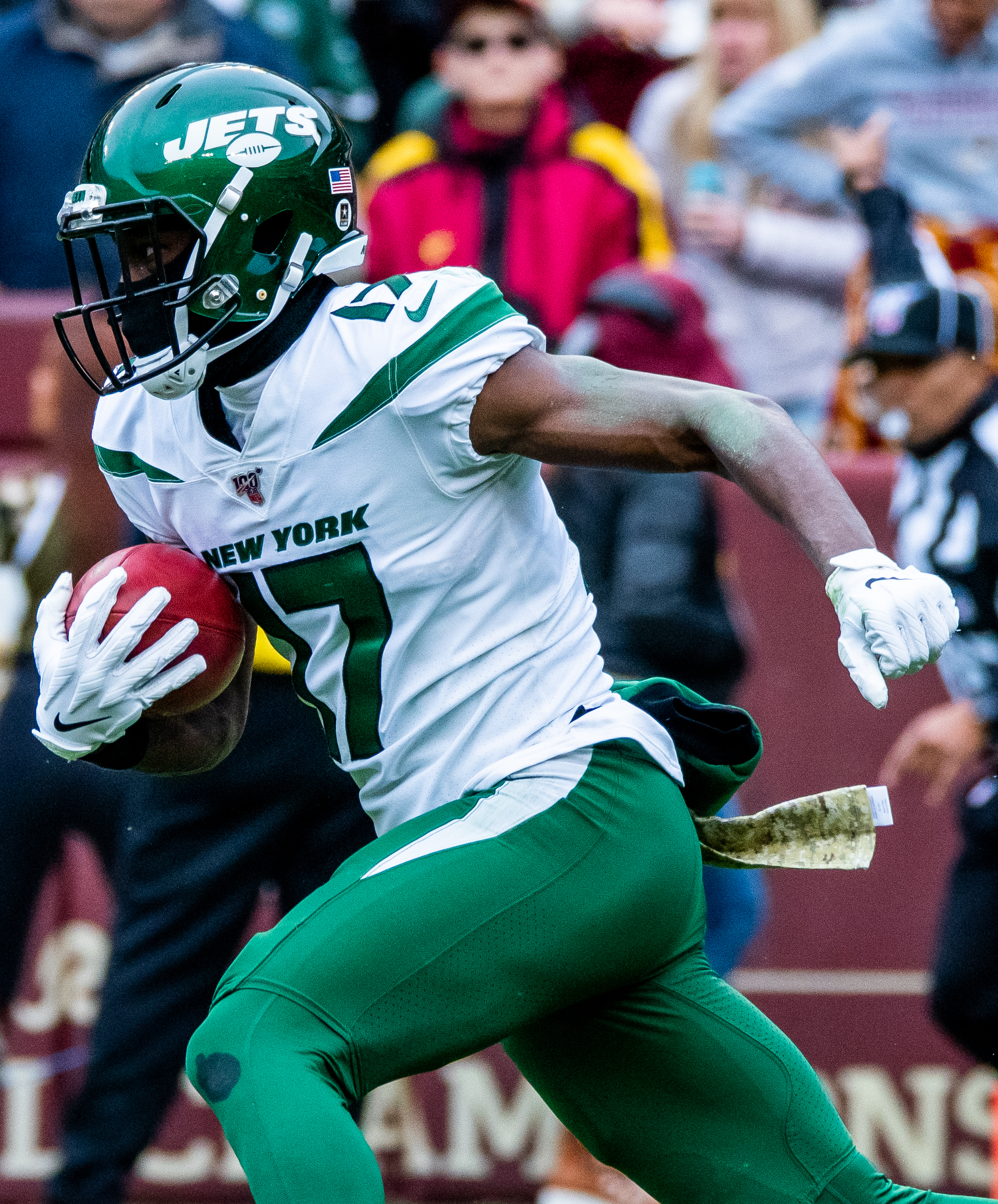
Vyncint Smith wearing the Jets' 2019–2023 "Take Flight" design.

The Jets changed their uniforms again in 2019, abandoning the team's classic look for the second time. The new design replaced the dark hunter green with a medium green that the team called "Gotham Green," and again added black to the traditional green-and-white color scheme. The primary logo was modified to be more football-shaped, with the "JETS" wordmark adjusted to make the "J" the same height as the other letters and moved slightly downward, the redesigned football graphic partially covering the lower portion of the letters "E" and "T". The serif outline "NY" behind the "JETS" wordmark was eliminated, and replaced with "NEW YORK" centered above it in smaller sans-serif italics.

The helmet was changed to a deep metallic emerald green shell with a black facemask, no striping, and a secondary logo on each side consisting of the "JETS" wordmark and football graphic from the primary logo. The green and white primary jerseys had numerals with thin black outlines in a new sans-serif block-style font, with single horizontal stripes around the shoulders tapering toward the collar, a "NEW YORK" wordmark above the numerals on the front, and the player's name in sans-serif block letters on the back. The TV numerals were shifted from the sleeves to the upper shoulders. The jerseys were paired with either green or white pants, with a tapered stripe on each side from hip to mid-thigh, and green or white socks.

The Jets also introduced a black alternate uniform, with white numerals outlined in green, green striping, and black socks. For the 2022 season, after the NFL lifted its "one-shell" rule, the team added a matte-black alternate helmet with a metallic-green facemask; the lettering and football on the secondary-logo decal were green outlined in white. The Jets also occasionally wore the black pants and socks with the white jerseys and green helmets beginning in 2021.

In 2023 the Jets added a "Legacy White" throwback uniform to the rotation, resembling the design used from 1978–89 with the wordmark from that era and white facemasks adorning the current metallic-green helmet shell, and white jerseys and pants with stripes, collars, numerals, lettering, and socks in Gotham Green (instead of the original kelly green). The jerseys employed the Champion numeral font and narrow, rounded sans-serif lettering for the players' names.

=== 2024–present: Legacy Collection ===
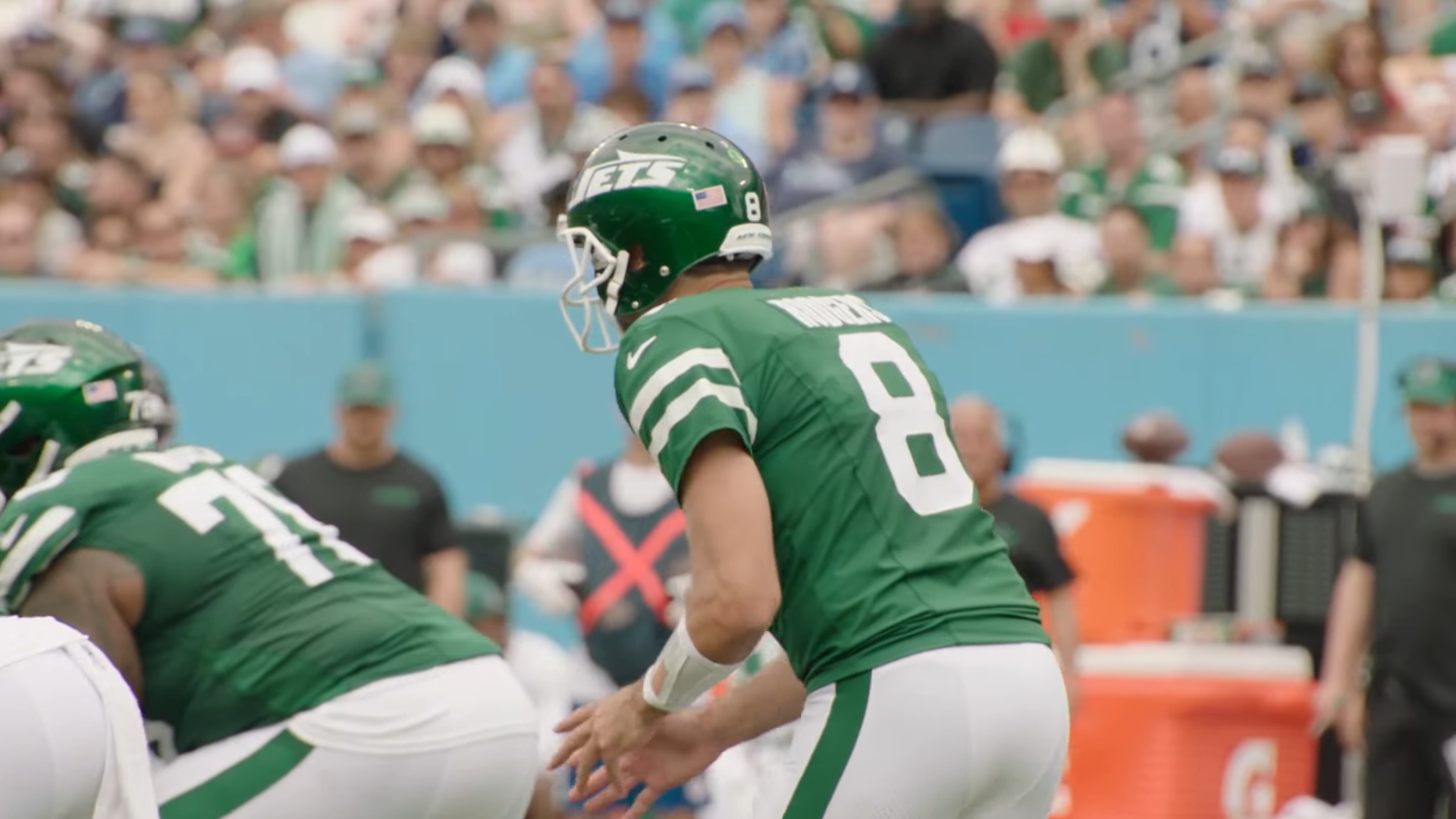
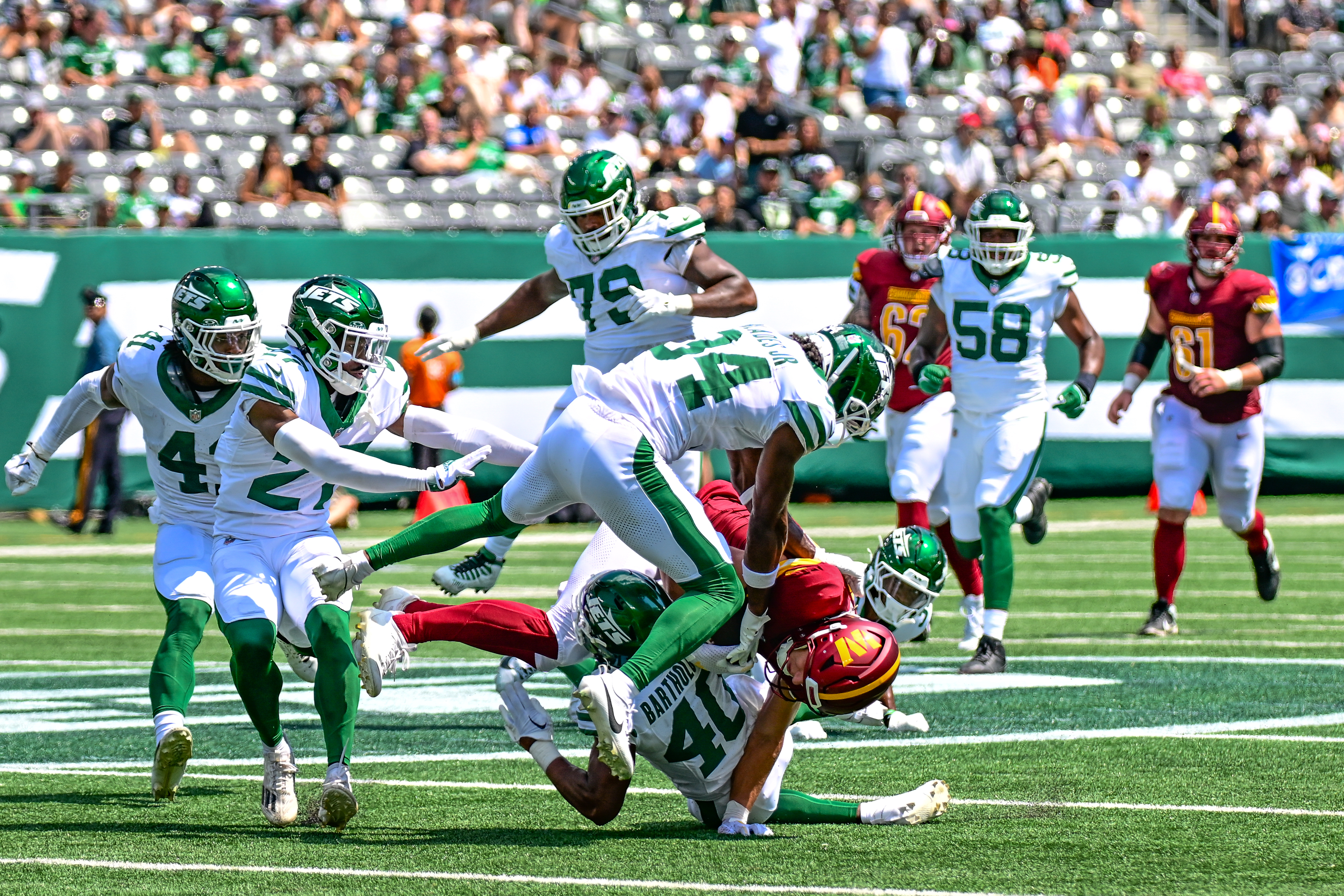
The Jets' current uniforms resemble the 1978–89 design.
A comparison of the Jets' 1978 (top) and 2024 primary logos.

In February 2024 the Jets announced that the team would be adopting the "Legacy White" throwback design as its primary uniform, adding both green and black versions, which were unveiled on April 15. The new primary uniforms resemble the 1978–89 design in most respects, although the "Gotham Green" shade (renamed "Legacy Green") and metallic-finish helmet shells were carried over and the set includes a green pants option; the green jerseys and pants are the inverse of the 2023 white throwback uniforms. For the primary logo the 1978 "JETS" wordmark was slightly modified to condense the spacing between the letters, and to widen the tail and streamline the nose of the jet silhouette. The black alternate uniform applies the same color scheme as the previous set to the new template, i.e., green stripes and collars, white numerals outlined in green, and matte-black helmets with metallic-green facemasks and the wordmark logo in green outlined in white.

Later in 2024 the Jets added a second alternate uniform called "The Classic," which combines elements of the 1963–77 and 1998–2018 designs. This uniform features a white helmet, jersey, pants and socks with numerals, striping, sleeves, and helmet decals in the current "Legacy Green" shade; the 1998 logo is used on the helmet but does not appear on the jersey, which uses the 1968 numeral and lettering fonts. The helmets also feature gray facemasks in another nod to the 1968 championship team.

In 2025 the NFL and Nike announced a "Rivalries" uniform program, to be phased in over four seasons, which would feature new designs to be worn by each team in a single home game against a divisional opponent. The first teams to receive these designs would be those in the NFC West and AFC East, including the Jets; the designs were announced on August 28, 2025. The Jets' design is dubbed "Gotham City Football" and was worn on December 7 against the Miami Dolphins. The base color of the jersey and pants is a slightly green-tinted shade of black, for which the franchise has revived the nickname "Gotham Green"; the numerals are silver outlined in dark grey, rendered in a custom "Gothic" typeface, with the player's name in silver sans-serif block letters on the back. On the shoulders are black-grey-black UCLA-style stripes, and the sleeve caps are black with a grey pattern meant to resemble New York City manhole covers; TV numerals are on the sleeves. The helmet is matte black with a black facemask, the "JETS" wordmark logo on each side in silver outlined in grey, and a dark grey center stripe with the manhole-cover pattern. The pants have black-grey-black striping (matching the shoulder stripes) on the seams from hip to cuff.

In 2026 the Jets added a fourth, "White Out" alternate helmet with a white shell and facemask, the primary wordmark logo in green, and a single green center stripe. The team wore these helmets with its primary white uniforms and white socks for its home opener against the Green Bay Packers on September 20.

==== Jim Pons Lawsuit ====
In July 2024 a former Jets employee named Jim Pons, who designed the original 1978 logo, filed a federal lawsuit against the Jets, the NFL and NFL Properties seeking unspecified damages for the use of the logo, cancellation of the Jets' trademark therein, and an injunction barring the team from using the design or selling merchandise bearing the logo without his consent or compensation. The Jets issued a statement that the logo "has been registered with the United States Patent and Trademark Office for nearly 50 years. The mark has been used continuously in numerous iterations since that time. We find this claim baseless and without merit.”

The lawsuit was voluntarily dismissed and then re-filed in November 2024, to add a claim of copyright infringement. The case settled in January 2025.

== Throwbacks and special uniforms ==
In 1993 the Jets became the first NFL team to wear a "throwback" uniform, for a home game on November 21 against the Cincinnati Bengals celebrating the 25th anniversary of the 1968 championship team. The jersey and pants mimicked the 1963-77 design, although the team wore its regular green helmets with a white-outlined version of the 1965-77 logo decal, and the jerseys used the 1972 Champion numeral font and thin serif block lettering for the players' names. Although it was a home game, the team wore white jerseys as it had done in Super Bowl III. In 1994, as part of the NFL's 75th Anniversary celebration, the Jets wore both home and road versions of this uniform in select games, again using their regular green helmets with the 1965-77 logo but with two parallel white stripes down the center, and a jersey patch by the player's left shoulder commemorating the NFL's 75th anniversary.

On October 14, 2007, the Jets celebrated their origin with a special Titans Throwback Day, a home game against the Philadelphia Eagles. The uniforms combined elements of the 1960 and 1961-62 uniforms, with navy blue helmets and jerseys, old gold serif numerals and helmet stripes, gold and white shoulder stripes, and gold pants with blue and white stripes on each side. The Jets wore these uniforms once more in December against the Miami Dolphins at Dolphin Stadium.

The Titans uniforms made another appearance in 2008; originally scheduled for the home opener against the Patriots, the throwback dates were changed to the second and third home games, against the Arizona Cardinals and Cincinnati Bengals, respectively. Later that season, on October 26 the Jets honored the 1968 championship team by displaying a commemorative 40th anniversary Super Bowl III patch on their left chest.

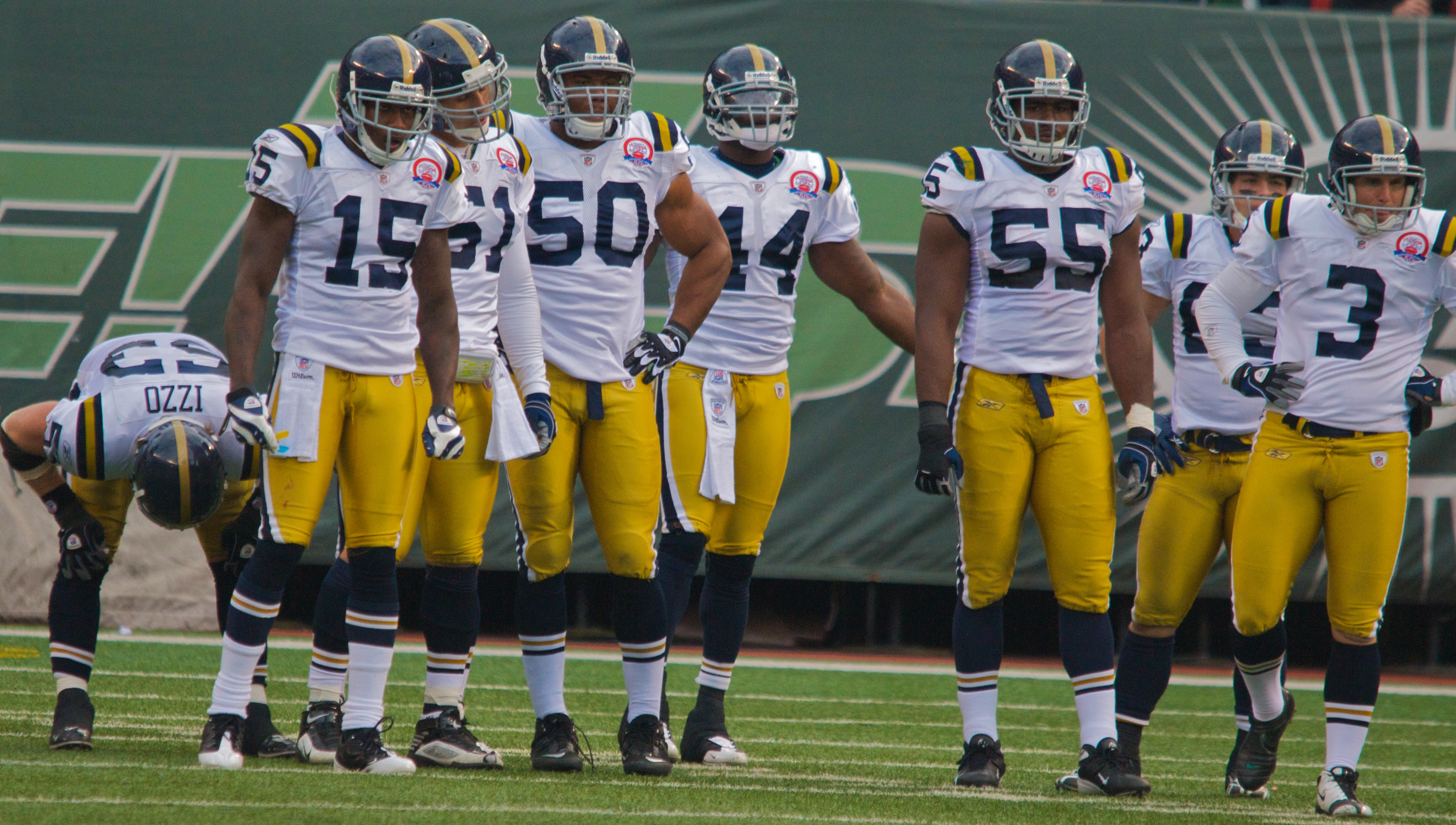
Jets players wearing the white Titans throwback uniforms in 2009.

In 2009, as part of the NFL's celebration of the 50th season for the original eight teams of the American Football League, the Jets wore their blue Titans uniforms in a home game against the Tennessee Titans, who dressed as the 1960 Houston Oilers, on September 27, 2009. The Jets also introduced a white-jersey version of the Titans throwbacks, with navy blue numerals and navy and gold shoulder stripes. The Jets wore these against the Raiders in Oakland on October 25, 2009, and again against the Miami Dolphins at home on November 1. Throughout the 2009 season, the Jets' jerseys featured their 50th anniversary patch; the Titans throwbacks also bore a commemorative AFL patch. Those throwbacks did not make an appearance in 2010 but were re-introduced a year later for a home game against the Jacksonville Jaguars. After that the NFL adopted a "one-helmet" rule as part of its concussion protocol, which precluded teams from using "throwback" helmets requiring a different-colored helmet shell until the rule was lifted in 2022.

On November 12, 2015, the Jets participated in the NFL's first "Color Rush" promotion on Thursday Night Football, at home against the Buffalo Bills. The uniform used the same design template as the standard uniform but with kelly green in place of hunter green; green jerseys and pants with white numerals and stripes, and solid green socks. Although the jerseys had the regular shoulder inserts the sleeves were not inverted, i.e., they were green with white TV numerals. The helmet decals, stripes and facemasks were also kelly green, with a shiny chromed finish. Because the Bills wore solid red uniforms in the game, the matchup was problematic for fans with red-green color blindness. When the two teams met again the following season for Thursday Night Football-"Color Rush" on September 15, 2016, the Jets wore their standard white uniforms and helmet decals with white facemasks and solid white socks.

On October 1, 2017, for a Sunday afternoon home game against the Jacksonville Jaguars, the Jets again wore white facemasks with their standard white uniforms, this time with the striped white socks. The kelly-green uniforms with chromed accents returned for a Thursday night "Color Rush" game on November 2, 2017, at home against the Bills, who wore white.

In 2018, the Jets wore white facemasks for a Monday night game in Detroit on September 10, then wore gray facemasks at home against the Indianapolis Colts on October 14 to mark the 50th Anniversary of the 1968 championship team that defeated the Colts (then hailing from Baltimore) in Super Bowl III. On October 21, at home against the Minnesota Vikings, they wore the kelly-green "Color Rush" uniforms with the chromed-green helmet accents, thus becoming the first NFL team to use four different facemask colors (white, gray and chromed green in addition to their standard green) in a single season. Also, on December 2 at Tennessee the Jets wore the green-topped socks instead of the white striped socks with the green pants, a first.

On November 4, 2021, the Jets paired their white jerseys with black pants and socks for the first time, in a road game against the Indianapolis Colts. They wore this combination for several games in 2022 both at home and on the road, and again on November 6, 2023 for a home game against the Los Angeles Chargers on Monday Night Football.

== Bibliography ==
- Chastain, Bill (2010). 100 Things Jets Fans Should Know & Do Before They Die. Chicago: Triumph Books. ISBN 978-1-60078-522-1.
