= Economy of the United States Virgin Islands =

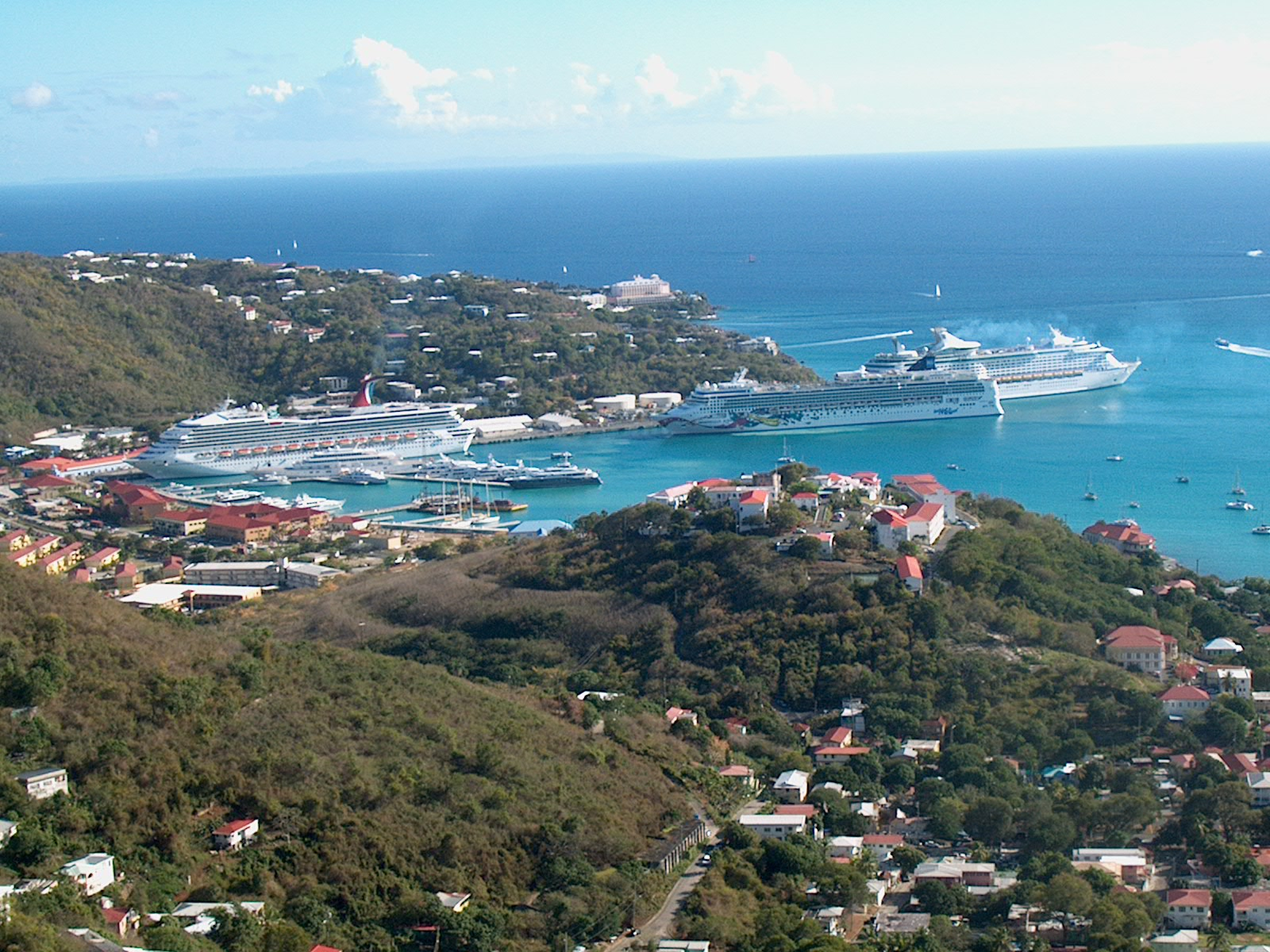
Charlotte Amalie Harbor, Saint Thomas, U.S. Virgin Islands

The economy of the United States Virgin Islands is primarily dependent upon tourism, trade, and other services, accounting for nearly 60% of the Virgin Island's GDP and about half of total civilian employment. Close to two million tourists per year visit the islands. The government is the single largest employer. The agriculture sector is small, with most food being imported. The manufacturing sector consists of rum distilling, electronics, pharmaceuticals, and watch assembly. Rum production is significant. Shipments during a six-month period of fiscal year 2016 totaled 8,136.6 million proof gallons.

In mid February 2017, the USVI was facing a financial crisis due to a very high debt level of $2 billion and a structural budget deficit of $110 million. The government introduced a "sin tax" bill that would introduce or increase taxes on rum, beer, tobacco products and sugary drinks, as well as internet purchases and timeshare unit owners. Governor Kenneth Mapp issued an order that restricted the use of government-owned vehicles, put a freeze on non-essential hiring, suspended wage negotiations, and froze non-essential travel paid for by the GVI. He also suspended negotiated wage increases, including those ordered by the U.S. Appeals Court.

This US territory uses US currency and its fiscal year is 1 October - 30 September.

== History ==
During the slave days of what was then the Danish West Indies, the islands cultivated cash crops to earn money. On July 3, 1848, after a rebellion the previous day, the governor Peter von Scholten granted the slaves emancipation, which was against the wishes of Danish Crown. Although some plantation owners refused to accept the abolition, some 5,000 blacks were freed while another 17,000 remained enslaved. In that era, slaves labored mainly on sugar plantations. Other crops included cotton and indigo. Over the following years, strict labor laws were implemented several times, leading planters to abandon their estates, causing a significant drop in population and the overall economy. In the late 1800, numerous natural disasters added to worsen the situation.

After the US purchased the islands from Denmark in 1917, the situation began to improve, though very slowly. By 1970, the economy had been boosted due to tourism and manufacturing. Tourism started to increase more significantly in the 1990s. New hotels, restaurants, and shops began to be built; this led to more jobs and an influx of immigrants which increased the population.

The HOVENSA oil refinery stopped exporting petroleum products in 2014. In the final year of full refinery operations, the value of exported petroleum products was $12.7 billion (2011 fiscal year).

The islands also receive cover-over revenues, which generated approximately $100 million for the Virgin Islands in 2008. Federal excise taxes collected on rum and other distilled spirits are rebated, or covered over, to the government of the Virgin Islands. In 2013, federal programs and grants of $241.4 million contributed 19.7% of the territory's total revenues.

Major banks have branches on St. Thomas, St. John and St. Croix. These include Citibank, Banco Popular de Puerto Rico, The Bank of Nova Scotia, First Bank and Virgin Islands Community Bank.

Major airlines travel to and from St. Thomas and St. Croix.

== Tourism ==
The tourism industry is the main industry, generating a substantial portion of the GDP and much of the islands' employment. Nearly 3 million tourists per year visit (2013 data), most arriving on cruise ships. Some 93 percent of tourists are from other areas of the US.

An industry (World Travel & Tourism Council) publication indicates that money spent by foreign visitors totaled $1,318.7 million. According to this report, Travel & Tourism generated 5,000 jobs directly in 2014, being 10.8% of total employment and 11.3 percent of the GDP. (This includes employment by hotels, travel agents, airlines and other passenger transportation services. It also includes the activities of the restaurant and leisure industries directly supported by tourists.) The total contribution of Travel & Tourism to GDP (including wider effects from investment) was 12,000 jobs in 2014 (27.0% of total employment and 29.9 percent of the total GDP).

These figures on employment are lower than the estimated by some other agencies' for the tourism industry based on their own research. (However, agencies differ as to the types of jobs they classify as being in tourism.) For example, Euromonitor indicates that over 50 percent of the workforce is employed in some tourism-related work.

The latest data (May 2016) from the islands' Bureau of Economic Research indicates that there were 37,613 non-agricultural wage and salary jobs in the islands. This report states that the "leisure and hospitality sector" employed an average of 7,333 people. However, the retail trade sector, which also serves many tourists, averaged another 5,913 jobs. Other categories which also include some tourism jobs include Arts and Entertainment (792 jobs), Accommodation & Food (6,541 jobs), Accommodation (3755 jobs), Food Services & Drink (2,766 jobs). When those are totaled, it is clear that a large percentage of the 37,613 non-farm workers are employed in dealing with tourists; of course, serving the local population is also part of the role of these sectors.

== Job market ==
According to the CIA's research, the service sector - tourism, trade, and other services - were the primary economic activities, accounting for most of the Virgin Island's GDP and about 80 percent of the employment in 2003. (More recent data is not available from this source.) The primary industries in 2013 were tourism, watch assembly, rum distilling, construction, pharmaceuticals and electronics. The local workforce totaled 50,580. The last watch assembly facilities, however, closed in 2015.

The report from the VI Bureau of Economic Research calculates that the labor force totaled 48,278 in the first half of 2016, with 42,752 persons classified as civilians. The unemployment rate was 11.5%. Some 29 percent were employed by the public sector, making it the largest employer.

The May 2016 report does not discuss the massive debt and provides this outlook: "The economy will continue on its present course of mild improvements with the major contributions coming from tourism, manufacture and construction In addition, several initiatives are being undertaken by Government ... will assist in the recovery. However, a strong recovery of private sector demand, including consumer and investment spending, is required to give momentum to the recovery that brings the economy back to its pre-recession growth."

=== Manufacturing and other sectors ===
Manufacturing industries developed significantly in the 1970s, especially on St. Croix island. Most industries depend of tax concessions and the financial advantages they derive from being a U.S. territory. An alumina factory processed bauxite until December 2009. The Hovensa oil refinery produced 495,000 barrels per day (78,700 m^{3}/d), and closed down in February 2012. Analysts reviewing the economy often point to the closure of the Hovensa oil refinery which had been the islands’ largest private sector employer. This certainly did affect the local economy, leaving 2,200 people jobless. In the final year of full refinery operations, the value of exported petroleum products was $12.7 billion. The islands' exports dropped after the 2012 closing of the refinery, from $3.339 billion to $2.627 billion. However, imports dropped as well, from $3.056 billion to $2.694 billion.

In late 2013, the Reserve Bank of New York's Research and Statistics Group pointed out that manufacturing employment dropped by 50 percent in May 2012, and by another 4 percent by November 2012, and that the GDP fell by 13 percent, "mainly due to an 80 percent drop-off in exports (mostly refined petroleum)". On the other hand, tourism and some other service industries were growing in 2013.

The CIA's World Factbook stated that in 2013, "the economy remains relatively diversified. Along with a vibrant tourism industry, rum exports, trade, and services will be major income sources in future years". A New York-based research group made the following comment in late 2013: "Looking ahead, we note that the tropical weather and picturesque beaches will continue to draw tourists, and natural resources bode well for rum production. However, the group also added that "it may also be worthwhile to look at the physical infrastructure and human capital built up over the years, with an eye toward using it for other types of productive economic activity".

The latest (May 2016) report indicated that there were an average 607 manufacturing jobs. By comparison, there were 1,487 natural resource and construction jobs and nearly 11,000 people worked in some aspect of agriculture in the first half of fiscal year 2016.

=== Internet and cell service ===
With the help of funding from the American Recovery and Reinvestment Act of 2009, the Virgin Islands Next Generation Network (a government-owned subsidiary) began bringing broadband internet access to the territory, in an effort to stimulate the technology sector and business generally. Today, broadband service is readily available via wireless and cable. Cellular phone service is also widely available on all four islands from several providers.

== Financial challenges ==
A May 2016 report by Bloomberg expressed concern about the islands debt load. "In terms of the debt load, on a per-capita basis, on an income basis, it's high,” said Marcy Block, a Fitch analyst. The government believes it will be able to repay the loans; in part that is "because of the way the bonds are structured. Many securities are backed by specific revenue streams, like excise taxes tied to rum production by Diageo Plc and Cruzan International Inc., that go straight from the U.S. Treasury to an escrow agent. Even bonds backed by gross receipt taxes, which offering documents say are “secured by its full faith and credit and taxing power,” also give the trustee a lien on the levies."

Some news media were reporting a financial crisis by January or February 2017. The USVI's overall tax-supported debt was $2 billion on January 23, which is very high considering the moderate population. That translated to a per capita debt of $19,000, which was worse than the per capita debt in Puerto Rico which was undergoing a severe financial crisis at the time. A Debtwire analyst writing in Forbes indicated that nothing short of a miracle would prevent a financial collapse.

By February 15, 2017, the GVI was short $110 million in its current budget (structural deficit). Governor Kenneth Mapp issued an executive order that limited the use of government-owned vehicles, puts a freeze on non-essential hiring, suspended wage negotiations, and froze non-essential travel paid for by the GVI. Some jobs are exempt from the hiring freeze: positions of civil servants whose salaries are paid through federal funds, human service workers, teachers, and those working in agencies under federal consent decrees like police and corrections officers. A report from Government House indicated that these steps were necessary "given that cash revenues flowing into the treasury are insufficient to meet current expenses".

On February 16, Dept. of Finance Commissioner and Public Finance Authority Executive Director, Valdamier Collens said the government had only two days of cash on hand, instead of the typical 15 or 16 days in recent months. The government introduced a bill labelled as a "sin tax", with a plan to introduce or to increase taxes. Commodities affected would include rum, tobacco products, beer and sugary drinks, as well as timeshare unit owners and internet purchases. "If we are able to pass measures that investors will view as we are addressing our structural deficit, that would bode well to the investors, but they're not going to jump out tomorrow and say, ‘Oh, come back to the market’," Collens said.

A coalition consisting of the Chambers of Commerce in the St Croix and St Thomas districts, the USVI Hotel and Tourism Association and American Resort Development Association issued a joint statement on February 14, 2017 asking Governor Kenneth Mapp to withdraw the sin tax bill. The group believes that the additional tax would be a "crushing blow" to business. It recommended an alternative: work "with the private sector to develop the ideas already presented to help alleviate the financial crisis". Mapp's response to the coalition included his understanding of the group's recommended strategies:

"For example, the chambers are asking that we slash the salaries of all government workers by 30 percent, that we increase property taxes on residential and commercial property and that we impose an income tax surcharge on the salaries of all workers in the Territory," he said. "These draconian recommendations of the Chambers of Commerce to avoid the imposition of a 25 cents tax on a bottle of beer or a 50 cents tax on a bottle of rum. It's now time to put our people ... first."

== Statistics ==
The CIA's research concluded that the islands hosted nearly 3 million tourists per year (2014 estimate), mostly from visiting cruise ships. However, the more recent May 2016 estimate for the number of arrivals by the VI Bureau of Economic Research totals 1,208,295 by cruise ship and 403,876 people by air. Not all of the latter would have been tourists, of course. The government's budget in 2013 consisted of $1.223 billion in revenues and $1.551 billion in expenditures. Federal programs and grants of $241.4 million contributed 19.7% of the territory's total revenues in 2013.

The following data was compiled from the reports published by the CIA and the VI Bureau of Economic Research. All of the information pre-dated the financial crisis of early 2017 which may have had an effect on several economic categories.

- Gross Domestic Product (official exchange rate):
  - $5.075 billion (2013)
- GDP - per capita (PPP):
  - $36,100 (2013 est.)
  - $39,300 (2012 est.)
  - $40,500 (2011 est.)
- GDP - real growth rate:
  - -5.4% (2013 est.)
  - -13.8% (2012 est.)
  - -7.5% (2011 est.)
- GDP - composition, by sector of origin:
  - agriculture: 2%
  - industry: 20%
  - services: 78% (2012 est.)

* Public debt: 45.9% of GDP (2014)

* Unemployment rate: 13% (2014) 11.5% (first half of 2016)

* Civilian labor force (2016) 42,752 persons

* Private sector jobs (2016) 71 percent of the total

* Average salary (2016) $39,258 (private sector, $34,088; public sector $52,572)

* Rum Shipments in six months (2016) 8,136.6 proof gallons

* Average value of homes sold (2015) $508,811
