= John B. Hess =

American businessman (born 1954)

John Hess
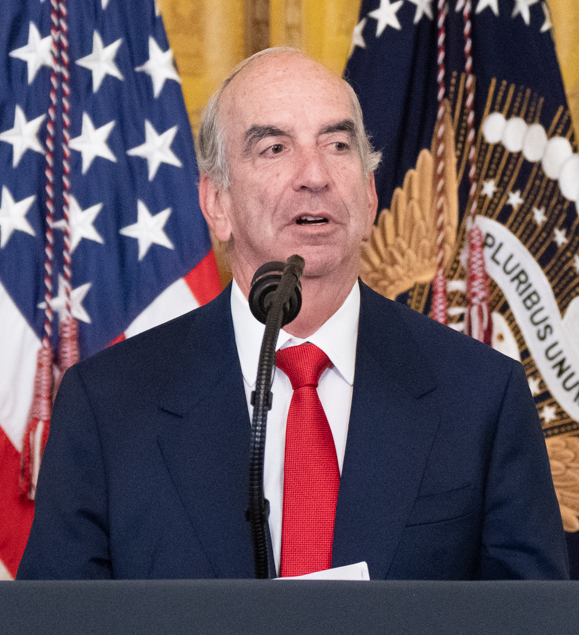
- Hess in 2025
- Born: John Barnett Hess; April 5, 1954 (age 72)
- Education: Harvard University (BA, MBA)
- Known for: CEO of Hess Corporation
- Political party: Republican
- Spouse: Susan Kessler
- Relatives: Leon Hess (Father), Constance H. Williams (sister)

John Barnett Hess (born April 5, 1954) is an American businessman who is the chief executive officer (CEO) of Hess Corporation.

== Early life and education ==
Hess was born in 1954 to a Jewish family, the son of Norma and Leon Hess. His father was the founder of the Hess Oil and Chemical, which later became the Amerada Hess Corporation and is now known as the Hess Corporation. His maternal grandfather was New Jersey attorney general David T. Wilentz, who prosecuted Bruno Richard Hauptmann in the Lindbergh baby kidnapping case. He has two sisters: Marlene Hess and former Pennsylvania State Senator Constance H. Williams.

He earned his undergraduate degree from Harvard College in 1975 and his MBA from Harvard Business School in 1977. He married Susan Elizabeth Kessler in 1984.

== Career ==
Hess became chairman and CEO of Hess Corporation in 1995. He stepped down as chairman in May 2013, retaining his position as CEO. In September 2024, the Federal Trade Commission conditioned approval of the company's $53 billion acquisition by Chevron Corporation on Hess being prohibited from serving on the company's board of directors due to his past communications with OPEC. Under the Trump Administration, the FTC reversed its decision barring Hess from joining Chevron's board just one day before the merger was completed and he was subsequently appointed in July 2025.

== Political involvement ==
Hess has been a longtime contributor to political campaigns, occasionally to Democrats, but primarily to the Republican Party, particularly in recent years.

In 2012, Hess contributed $33,300 to the Mitt Romney presidential campaign. He also contributed $100,000 to American Crossroads, a Republican super PAC, later the same year.

Hess contributed $1 million to Donald Trump's first inauguration in 2017.

While Hess did not contribute directly to either presidential campaign during the 2016 US Presidential Election cycle, he contributed $100,000 to Trump Victory, the primary joint fundraising committee of the Donald Trump campaign in November 2017.

In 2020, amidst the COVID-19 pandemic, Trump appointed Hess to his "Opening the Country" council. The council was a roundtable of business leaders serving as advisors on the reopening of the economy in the face of the crisis. The council was controversial as governors and local officials asserted their authority to determine when and how to reopen economies in their jurisdictions and media noted that the oil executives appointed to the council had contributed large sums to Trump's political action committees.

Hess again abstained from contributing to either candidate's campaign or affiliated PACs during the 2024 Presidential campaign cycle. However, in December of the following year, Hess and his wife, Susan, contributed $1 million each to Trump's MAGA Inc. super PAC. The Trump Administration has been accused of using the PAC to maintain a "pay for access" operation. Media outlets noted contemporaneously that Hess' contribution followed the Trump FTC's approval of Hess Corporation's merger with Chevron and immediately preceded their encouraging of American oil companies to expand operations in Venezuela following the 2026 US Intervention there.

In 2025, Hess donated $1 million to a super PAC supporting Andrew Cuomo for mayor of New York City.
