= Cover-over subsidies =

Cover-over subsidies are annual payments from the U.S. government to the U.S. Virgin Islands and Puerto Rico out of federal excise taxes. For example, when a bottle of rum is produced in either the Virgin Islands or Puerto Rico, and then sold in the United States, the federal excise tax on that bottle is returned to its place of production. Cover-over subsidies for U.S. island territories began in 1917. In 2008, the taxes generated about $371 million for Puerto Rico and $100 million for the Virgin Islands.

In April 2009, Puerto Rico's congressional representative, Pedro Pierluisi, introduced a bill prohibiting territories from using more than 10 percent of their cover-over receipts for industry specific subsidies. This was as a result of increased competition to source distillery production between Puerto Rico and the U.S. Virgin Islands.

== See also ==
- Economy of Puerto Rico
- Economy of the United States Virgin Islands
