= Meadville Corporation =

- Logo used for retail branding at fuel stations.
- Industry: Oil and gas
- Founded: June 9, 1930; 95 years ago in Elizabeth, New Jersey
- Defunct: February 2000
- Fate: Taken over
- Successor: Hess Corporation
- Headquarters: Haverford, Pennsylvania, United States
- Area served: Northeastern United States
- Products: Petroleum refining and distribution

The Meadville Corporation was an oil company based in Haverford, Pennsylvania. It was founded in 1930 in Elizabeth, New Jersey. Fuel was sold at retail gas stations under the brand name "Merit", the logo consisting of a red "M" with the right vertical support cut off. Merit gas stations could be found throughout the Northeastern United States. For many years, Amerada Hess had a large stake in the company. In 2000, Hess acquired the remainder of the Meadville Corporation and rebranded its 178 Merit gas stations as Hess. Those stations became part of Marathon Petroleum's Speedway brand due to the latter company's purchase of Hess's retail assets in 2014. 7 years later, Japanese-based Seven & I Holdings purchased Speedway, making those stations a part of the 7-Eleven family.
