= Lemmerman v. A.T. Williams Oil Co. =

- Court: North Carolina Supreme Court
- Full case name: R. Douglas Lemmerman, Guardian Ad Litem For Jonathan Shane Tucker, a Minor, and Sylvia A. Tucker v. A.T. Williams Oil Company
- Decided: November 18, 1986
- Citations: 318 N.C. 577; 350 S.E.2d 83

Case history
- Appealed from: 79 N.C. App. 642, 339 S.E.2d 820 (1986)
- Subsequent actions: Rehearing denied, 318 N.C. 704, 351 S.E.2d 736 (1986)

Case opinions
- Decision by: Henry Frye
- Dissent: Harry Martin

Lemmerman v. A.T. Williams Oil Co., 318 N.C. 577, 350 S.E.2d 83 (1986), was a case before the Supreme Court of North Carolina, which hinged on the question of whether the plaintiff met the definition as an "employee" of the A.T. Williams Oil Co. under the state's Workers' Compensation Act.

It appears as a principal case in the section of the Rothstein, Liebman employment law casebook discussing the foundations of the employer-employee relationship.

== Facts ==
Shane Tucker, age 8, would accompany his mother to work, where she was a cashier at the Wilco convenience store on Wendover Avenue in Greensboro. There, he would pick up trash, put away cigarettes, stock bottles in the cooler, and perform other odd jobs, for which the employer's manager paid him $1.00 per day.

According to the court, "A fair reading of the child's testimony discloses that he clearly expected to be paid for his efforts." His mother "testified that her understanding was that the child was going to be paid for what he did. Although she told Schneiderman originally that Shane would work without being paid, he rejected this offer and told both her and the child that he would pay Shane for his work. She believed that Schneiderman paid Shane a dollar a day."

On December 1, 1982, Shane slipped on the sidewalk on the employer's property and cut his hand. On June 26, 1984, Shane and his mother filed a complaint, which alleged in essence that Shane's injuries (pain wages, medical expenses) were proximately caused by defendant's negligence.

The defendant's answer raised as one of its defenses lack of subject matter jurisdiction: It asserted that the child Shane was its employee as defined by the Workers' Compensation Act and that the Industrial Commission accordingly had exclusive jurisdiction over plaintiffs' claim. (By statute, the Superior Court is divested of original jurisdiction of all actions which come within the provisions of the Workmen's Compensation Act.)

== Judgment ==
=== Trial court ===
Based on several evidentiary findings, the judge concluded that Shane was an employee injured within the course and scope of his employment with defendant as defined in the Workers' Compensation Act.

=== Court of Appeals ===
Plaintiffs appealed to the Court of Appeals, which affirmed on the question of whether the evidence supported the conclusion that plaintiff Shane was an employee of defendant.

First, the court confirmed that "the question of whether [Shane] was defendant's employee as defined by the Act is clearly jurisdictional." The court noted that the fact that the minor may have been illegally employed would in no way bar the defendant from raising this jurisdictional defense, because the Act specifically includes within its provisions illegally employed minors. To this point, it cited the claim in Burgess v. Gibbs that "A universal principal as old as the law is that the proceedings of a court without jurisdiction of the subject matter are a nullity."

Second, after reviewing the evidence, the court expressed the opinion that "this evidence amply supports the trial judge's findings that Schneiderman, who had the authority to hire and fire employees, hired the minor plaintiff to do odd jobs as needed in defendant's service station/convenience store business. Specifically, these tasks included stocking cigarettes and drinks, and picking up trash. At the time of the accident, Shane was engaged in doing these tasks."

Third, the court rebutted the plaintiff's three counterarguments for why Shane could not have been an employee:

1. ... that "Schneiderman did not comply with certain procedural formalities" (he did not take an application from Shane, or report him on the list of employees he turned into his supervisor for withholding purposes; his normal practice was to pay employees from the cash register, but he paid Shane from his pocket). The court explained: "We do not believe that any of these factors is dispositive. Our Court of Appeals has held that failure to follow technical procedures such as withholding F.I.C.A. and income taxes is not controlling on the issue of whether an employer-employee relationship exists. We also do not think that Schneiderman's method of paying Shane was as significant under the facts of this case as it might otherwise be, because all wages came out of Schneiderman's commission. He therefore paid all of the employees at Wilco out of his own money."
2. ... that "Shane was not an employee but instead performed gratuitous services". The court explained: a) Schneiderman's testimony denying that he hired Shane was rejected by the trial judge. b) Tucker's original statement to Schneiderman that he did not have to pay the child supports the conclusion that Shane was an employee, because "Schneiderman was offered the chance to avail himself of Shane's gratuitous services, but he specifically rejected it and said that he wanted to pay the child for his work."
3. ... "that if Shane was an employee, he was Schneiderman's personal employee". Rejecting this, the court explained: "Schneiderman had the authority to hire employees for the defendant, and the evidence shows and the trial judge found that the tasks the child performed were in the course of defendant's business, not Schneiderman's personal affairs."

=== Dissent ===
Justice Webb put three arguments forward in dissent.

1. The majority corporation permits the defendant corporation to enrich itself as a result of its own wrongdoing. Hiring Shane would be a direct violation of the statute making it unlawful for employers to employ children thirteen years of age or less; and "It is a basic principle of law and equity that no man shall be permitted to take advantage of his own wrong" -- "especially applicable where, as here, the power of the parties is so disparate"—i.e., "The inequity of defendant's plea in bar is thus magnified by the relationship of the parties."
2. Agreeing with the majority that "the right to demand payment from the employer, A.T. Williams Oil Company, is an essential element of the employment status," "defendant has failed to produce a shred of evidence that the eight-year-old child had a right to demand his services from A.T. Williams Oil Company. Also, there is no evidence that plaintiff child could have made such a demand from Schneiderman, albeit defendant argues that plaintiff was its employee and not Schneiderman's. ... On the other hand, the record is replete with evidence that plaintiff child was not an employee of defendant's. Shane was not a listed employee for workers' compensation purposes; his name was not reported to the defendant corporation for tax withholding purposes; Schneiderman testified explicitly that Shane was not an employee."
3. "Shane was on the premises not as an employee of the corporate defendant, but because it was necessary in order for his mother to work." "This is entirely consistent with the problem of a working mother who needs employment but must also supervise her child. ... Such are the demands of her modern society."

== Significance ==
In Employment Law: Cases and Materials, it is used to outline the employer-employee relationship. Subsequent to the case there are five notes.

- Note 2 inquires whether there is "something wrong with an eight-year-old, who is too young to be a legal employee, receiving worker's compensation", suggesting that the opinion could interfere with "the public policy of prohibiting child labor". It lists some courts that have held that illegally employed minors, injured or killed on the job, should be limited to workers' compensation; and point out that other courts "have found this outcome to be unjust and contrary to public policy".
- Note 3 indicates ways in which other categories are contrasted with "employee" status:
  - Injured individuals sometimes argue that they are independent contractors who can sue in tort—e.g. Eckis v. Sea World, holding that plaintiff, who was bitten by Shamu the killer whale while riding Shamu at Seaworld, was not a contractor but an employee, and so could not sue in tort.
  - For the purpose of determining whether a person is entitled to full old age benefits, the U.S. Social Security system contrasts persons who are "retired" (i.e. is getting dividends—a return on capital) and is entitled to full old age benefits, vs. someone who is not "retired" (receiving income from labor). The issues are discussed in Taubenfeld v. Bowen.
- Note 4 points out that "There is no single test of 'employee'; the relationship is categorized differently for different regulatory purposes". As examples, it mentions NLRB v. Hearst Pub's, Inc 322 U.S. 111 (1944) (National Labor Relations Act); Nationwide Mut. Ins. Co. v. Darden, 503 U.S. 318 (1992) (ERISA); Clackamas Gastroenterology Assocs. v. Wells, 538 U.S. 440 (2003) (Americans with Disabilities Act).
- Note 5 mentions that the 1999 Dunlop Commission addressed the issue of the definition of employee in the following terms:

The Commission concludes that the ancient doctrine of master and servant provides a poor vehicle for delivering federal employment policy into the twenty-first century. The law in this area should be modernized and streamlined: there is no need for every federal employment and labor statute to have its own definition of employee. We recommend that Congress adopt a single, coherent concept of employee and apply it across the board in employment and labor law.
