= Hovensa =

Oil refinery in the United States Virgin Islands

Limetree Bay Refinery (Formerly Hovensa)
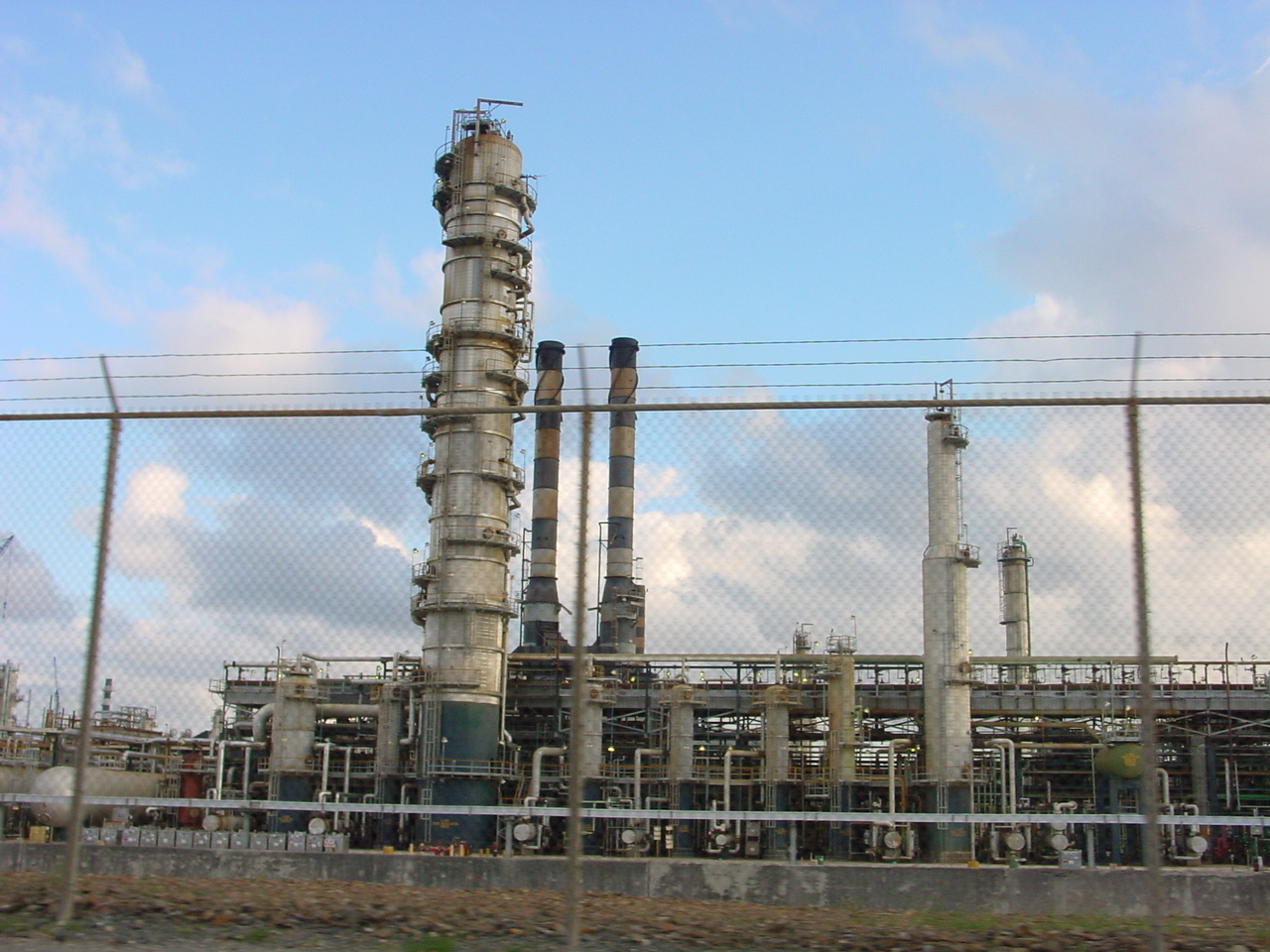
- Limetree Bay Refinery, Saint Croix, United States Virgin Islands

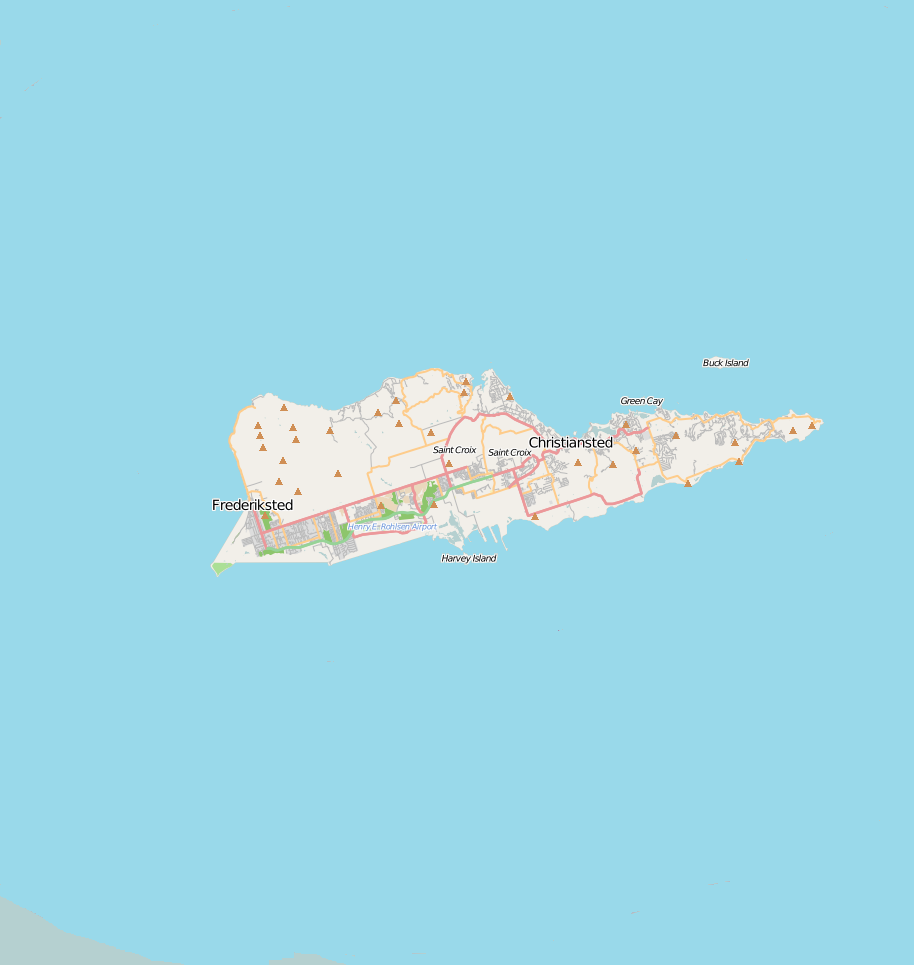
- Refinery location in St. Croix
- Location: Christiansted; 17°42′16″N 64°45′19″W

Refinery details
- Operator: Hovensa LLC
- Owners: Hess Corporation, PDVSA
- Opened: 1966
- Capacity: 646,000 barrels per day (102,700 m^{3}/d)

Limetree Bay Refinery (known also as Hovensa, styled HOVENSA) is an oil refinery located on the island of Saint Croix in the United States Virgin Islands. The refinery was a joint venture between Hess Corporation and PDVSA. For most of its operating life as Hovensa, it supplied heating oil and gasoline to the U.S. Gulf Coast and the eastern seaboard with the crude mainly sourced from Venezuela. Previously it had sourced its crude feedstock from a number of other countries including Libya. At a capacity of about 500,000 barrels per day (79,000 m^{3}/d), in 2010 the refinery was among the 10 largest in the world.

Hess Oil Virgin Islands Corporation started refinery construction in January 1966 having purchased the property from Annie de Chabert and, in October of the same year, the refinery started operating. In 1974, the capacity of refinery was expanded up to its peak at 650,000 barrels per day (103,000 m^{3}/d). Hovensa LLC, which took over the refinery operatorship, was established in 1998.

In January 2011, Hovensa paid a $5.3 million penalty for Clean Air Act violations. The company closed the refinery in 2012, operating the property continued as a storage terminal only until that closed in 2015. Hovensa filed for Chapter 11 bankruptcy in September 2015, and a purchase proposal by Atlantic Basin Refining was vetoed by the USVI Senate, but in November 2015 a joint venture (of ArcLight Capital Partners and Freepoint Commodities) called Limetree Bay Terminals succeeded in purchasing the Refinery.

On November 30, 2018 Limetree Bay announced it had closed on $1.25 billion dollars of financing for the refinery to partially reopen by the end of 2019.

Hovensa ultimately restarted the refinery in January 2021 after almost a decade offline. During a gas flare incident in May 2021, oil droplets emitted from a smokestack rained down on nearby houses, fouling rainwater collection systems. Residents across the island reported feeling nauseous and ill from the release of fumes. The plant shut down voluntarily and two days later, the US Environmental Protection Agency (EPA) issued an 60-day mandatory shutdown order. Limetree Bay filed for Chapter 11 bankruptcy on July 12.

Port Hamilton Refining and Transportation LLLP (PHRT) won the bankruptcy auction with a bid of $62 million in June 2022. The new owner says it will reopen it when it is safe to do so. PHRT sued the EPA regarding which permits will be needed to reopen.

For two weeks in August, 2022, a fire burned in the petroleum coke conveyor loading system, prompting an EPA inspection. The company agreed to sell off and remove from the site ammonia, liquefied petroleum gas, and an amine solution, which presented safety hazards.
