= A. T. Williams Oil Co. =

U.S. gas station chain

A. T. Williams Oil Co. was gas station chain based in Winston-Salem, North Carolina. It was started by Arthur Tab Williams Jr. in 1963. In the 21st century it operated in a joint venture as WilcoHess.

== History ==
Arthur Tab Williams Jr. worked for his father-in-law, Roby Taylor, at Taylor Oil Company for six years before starting A. T. Williams Oil in 1963 with two other employees and six full-service gas stations that he bought from Taylor Oil. In the late 1960s and early 1970s Williams added self service, eventually switching entirely to self-service because that was 95 percent of sales. Convenience stores were added in the 1980s, and by 1982 Williams had 67 locations. Diesel bays were first added in 1988 in Suffolk, Virginia, and in 1990 a travel plaza with facilities for truck drivers was added at Raphine, Virginia.

In 1999, Williams had 130 Wilco stations in North Carolina, South Carolina, Virginia, and Georgia. The company bought eight Exxon stations in the Winston-Salem area.

In 2001, a joint venture began between A. T. Williams and Amerada Hess, and the company was rebranded as WilcoHess. At the time, Williams had 120 gas stations and 21 travel centers, and had expanded to Pennsylvania and Alabama. Hess had supplied Williams for 35 years. Steve Williams would be president of WilcoHess. On October 23, 2003, WilcoHess announced it acquired 50 Servco stations in North Carolina from Service Distributing Co. Inc. of Albemarle, North Carolina, which was getting out of the business. WilcoHess had 155 stores and 38 restaurants and plans for a travel center in Tennessee.

In 2005, WilcoHess joint venture acquired Trade Mart and the business was renamed Trade-Wilco, with gas pumps being replaced with Hess.

In 2013, though it was leaving the business, Hess bought the remaining 56 percent interest in WilcoHess LLC, which had 353 convenience stores and 37 travel plazas in Alabama, Florida, Georgia, North Carolina, Pennsylvania, South Carolina, Tennessee and Virginia.

In October 2014, Hess, along with what had once been the WilcoHess/A. T. Williams chain, was acquired by Speedway LLC in a $2.82 billion deal. Over 1200 WilcoHess stores began converting to Speedway in October 2014. The last changes began in the Southeast on September 28, 2015.

Following the takeover by Speedway, six former WilcoHess locations in Virginia were rebranded as Pilot locations and jointly operated between Pilot Flying J and Speedway. On June 23, 2016, Pilot Flying J and Speedway announced a new joint venture between the two companies that would see 41 Speedway locations—all former Wilco Hess locations—and 79 Pilot Flying J locations primarily in the Southeastern United States form PFJ Southeast LLC. The locations would be operated by Pilot Flying J and the Speedway locations will be rebranded as either Pilot or Flying J.

In October 2016, founder Arthur Tab Williams Jr. died at the age 88.

== See also ==
- Lemmerman v. A.T. Williams Oil Co.
