= Triton Energy =

Triton Energy Limited
- Industry: Oil and Gasoline
- Founded: 1962
- Defunct: 2001
- Fate: Acquired by Amerada Hess Corporation
- Successor: Amerada Hess Corporation (now Hess Corporation)
- Headquarters: Dallas, Texas
- Products: Petrochemical

Triton Energy Limited (NYSE: OIL) (formerly known as Triton Energy Corporation prior to March 25, 1996) was one of the largest independent oil and natural gas exploration and production companies in the United States. Triton was founded in Dallas, Texas by E.R. Wiley in 1962, and had total proved reserves of almost 300 million barrels of oil equivalent when Amerada Hess Corporation purchased it in 2001 for $3.2 billion. At the time, Triton had operations in North and South America, West Africa, Southeast Asia, Europe, Australia and New Zealand.

== History ==
Triton Energy began business in 1962 in much the same way as other wildcatter oil companies of its day. However, unlike many other U.S. based oil companies, Triton spent much of the 1960s and early 1970s scouring the globe for large reserves of oil and natural gas. Ignoring potentially low-return domestic opportunities for higher risk, but much more lucrative overseas exploration, Triton offset its expensive exploration costs with large finds in Thailand, France, and Australia.

By the mid 1980s the entire oil industry was suffering setbacks due to a glutted oil market and plunging gas prices, and Triton was no exception. Despite increasing revenues and doubling sales, Triton posted losses of $7.8 million in 1988 and, in an effort to mitigate its oil losses, diversified into other energy-related industries, including seismic equipment manufacturing, domestic pipeline systems and airport services operations.

Finally, in 1991 a major oil discovery in Colombia turned the company's stock around. Despite the new oil reserve the company continued to post losses each year because the Colombian drilling operations would not produce a positive cash flow until 1995. Triton reorganized the corporation and in 1992 moved William Lee, who had been president since 1966, to the position of chairman of the board and replaced him with Thomas G. Finck, a petroleum engineer and industry veteran. Within a year, Finck became chief executive officer and, in 1995, became chairman.

In 1997, Triton notably became the subject of a Securities and Exchange Commission complaint, which alleged that Triton had violated the Foreign Corrupt Practices Act. According to the New York Times, "The unusual complaint was brought by the Securities and Exchange Commission, which contends that Triton officials not only made payments that violated the Foreign Corrupt Practices Act, but also falsified their records to make the bribes appear to be routine business payments." Triton settled the case for US$300,000.

At the same time that Triton's oil and gas reserves were increasing, the company began divesting its non-oil subsidiaries and reducing its working operations. The company continued to focus its attention on exploration and development, and entered the new millennium, posting annual net profits.

In July 2001, Amerada Hess Corporation and Triton announced an agreement under which Hess would purchase all outstanding ordinary shares of Triton for $45.00 per share; 50% over Triton's closing stock price the day before. According to press releases, the purchase would greatly increase Hess's production growth and exploration potential and would make Hess one of the world's largest independent energy exploration and production companies.
