= Hess Oil and Chemical =

American oil company

Hess Oil and Chemical Corporation was a company founded in the early 1930s by Leon Hess of New Jersey to distribute heating oil. It expanded over the years to include refining and marketing of heating oil and other petroleum products through terminals and gasoline stations.

In 1968, Hess Oil and Chemical Corporation merged with Amerada Petroleum Corporation into Amerada Hess Corporation (NYSE: HES). Since 2006, the merged company has been called Hess Corporation.

== History ==
Before the merger, Hess Oil and Chemical developed the Hess Oil Virgin Islands Corporation (HOVIC) Refinery on St. Croix, United States Virgin Islands, at the time the largest oil refinery in the world. After 1998 the refinery built by HOVIC operated under the name HOVENSA as a joint venture with PDVSA, the Venezuelan state-owned oil and natural gas company; Hess owns 50% of the venture.

On January 18, 2012, HOVENSA announced plans to close later on that year.

== Current status ==
Hess is an independent energy company engaged in the exploration and production of crude oil and natural gas, with a position in a key U.S. shale play—the Bakken in North Dakota. Hess is also one of the largest producers in the deepwater Gulf of Mexico and a key natural gas producer and supplier to Peninsular Malaysia and Thailand. The company is engaged in exploration and appraisal activities offshore Guyana, participating in one of the industry's largest oil discoveries in the past decade with the first phase of a planned multiphase development of the Liza Field in Guyana underway.

Hess is no longer involved in retail sales of petroleum products.
