= Freepoint Commodities =

- Type: Private
- Industry: Commodities trading
- Founded: 2011; 15 years ago
- Headquarters: Stamford, Connecticut, United States
- Key people: David Messer (CEO); Sheldon Pang (vice-chairman); Rob Feilbogen (COO)
- Number of employees: 625
- Website: freepoint.com

Freepoint Commodities is a commodities trading company based in Stamford, Connecticut.

In February 2023, a former employee of the company and its agent in Brazil were indicted for their alleged role in a bribery scheme.

In December 2023, the company agreed to pay more than $98 million to settle an alleged conspiracy to bribe Brazilian officials to attain contracts with Petrobras.

In March 2024, the company's head of European physical gas trading, resigned to start a new gas and power hedge fund.
