= Leon Hess =

American oil executive

- Hess with Bill Parcells in 1997
- Born: March 14, 1914; Asbury Park, New Jersey, U.S.
- Died: May 7, 1999 (aged 85); New York City, U.S.
- Occupations: Founder of the Hess Corporation; Owner of the New York Jets
- Spouse: Norma Wilentz
- Children: Marlene Hess Zirin; Constance H. Williams; John B. Hess

Leon Hess (March 14, 1914 – May 7, 1999) was an American businessman, the founder of the Hess Corporation and owner of the New York Jets. Hess built an oil terminal in New Jersey after the Great Depression, building his first refinery in the late 1950s. He sold his company, Hess Oil and Chemical, in 1963 and joined a consortium to buy the New York Jets. Hess was responsible for moving the Jets to Giants Stadium in East Rutherford, New Jersey, in 1984.

In 1969, Hess acquired Amerada Petroleum Corporation, one of the largest producers of crude oil in the United States. The acquisition saw Amerada merging with Hess Oil and Chemical to form the Amerada Hess Corporation. Hess was chairman and CEO until 1995. He died at the age of 85 on May 7, 1999. Hess was posthumously inducted into the New Jersey Hall of Fame in 2011.

== Early life ==
Hess was born on March 14, 1914, to a Jewish family in Asbury Park, New Jersey. His parents were Ethel (née Friedman) and Morris Hess, a kosher butcher who had emigrated from Lithuania and—after arriving in the United States—worked as an oil delivery man in Asbury Park, New Jersey. Hess worked as a driver for his father's company and, after it went bankrupt in 1933 during the Great Depression, he reorganized the company. He built an oil terminal in Perth Amboy, New Jersey, out of old oil tankers and aggressively underbid his competitors to win Federal oil contracts. He served in World War II, rising to the rank of major, and serving as the fuel supply officer for General George S. Patton, where he further developed his logistical expertise.

== Career ==
After the war, using a network of smaller terminals, Hess's success continued. In the late 1950s, he built his first refinery; and in 1960, he opened a chain of gas stations. In the early 1960s, he built the world's largest oil refinery at the time on St. Croix in the United States Virgin Islands to take advantage of federal tax benefits. The refinery was able to secure foreign refiner status (allowing it to circumvent the federal rule that required the use of higher-cost U.S.-flagged vessels when shipping oil to the East Coast) while also receiving subsidies from the United States Department of Energy as a domestic refinery. In 1963, his company, Hess Oil and Chemical, went public. In 1969, using the proceeds from the Hess sale, he acquired the Amerada Petroleum Corporation, one of the largest producers of crude oil in the United States. As part of the purchase, he merged it with his former company, Hess Oil and Chemical, to form the Amerada Hess Corporation. Hess was chairman and CEO of Amerada Hess until 1995.

=== New York Jets ===
In 1963, Hess was part of a consortium that bought the New York Jets which included Sonny Werblin, Philip H. Iselin, Townsend B. Martin, and Donald C. Lillis. His initial investment was $250,000. He bought out his partners: Werblin in 1968, the heirs of Iselin in 1977, Martin in 1981 and on February 9, 1984, he became the sole owner of the club after purchasing the last quarter-share from Helen Dillon, Lillis' daughter. The Jets played in Shea Stadium in 1964 after four seasons in the Polo Grounds that saw them share it with the New York Mets, who retained the money from any hot dog sold at Jets games to go along with parking revenue. Growing dissatisfaction with the stadium led to them moving the team to play at Giants Stadium in East Rutherford, New Jersey for the 1984 season (they had previously debated moving there six years prior).

Sports agent Leigh Steinberg once recounted a story about meeting Hess, who related about the "important people I know", showing him a card of the Ayatollah Khomeini. Famously reticent about talking to the press, Hess attended just three press conferences as an owner who often shunned publicity to the point where he whispered to journalists to not put it in the paper that he was attending a practice session. Hess made sure that Dennis Byrd, who suffered a broken neck with partial paralysis on the field, received the final two years of his contract of over $1 million. When the Jets arrived at the airport after the loss in the 1999 AFC Championship Game, Hess was there to greet and thank them. Prior to dying, Hess gave assistant coach/defensive coordinator Bill Belichick a $1 million bonus, which became a sticking point of contention when Belichick was briefly promoted to head coach in 2000.

From his first year as a majority owner in 1968 until the year he died in 1999, the Jets were 212-270-2 with eight playoff appearances.

== Personal life and death ==
In 1947, he married Norma Wilentz. Wilentz's father was former Attorney General of New Jersey David T. Wilentz who prosecuted Bruno Richard Hauptmann in the Lindbergh baby kidnapping case. They had three children: Marlene Hess Zirin, Constance H. Williams, and John B. Hess. Marlene is married to lawyer, writer, and cable TV talk show host, James D. Zirin.

In April 1999, he broke his hip and was admitted to Lenox Hill Hospital. While still at the hospital, he died on May 7, 1999, from a "blood disease".

In the will of Hess, he stated that the team would be sold and that his executors would hire Goldman, Sachs & Co to manage the Jets' sale, stating, "It is my intent that my interests in the Jets be disposed of unaffected by any desire of family members to participate in the club's future ownership."

== Legacy ==
In 2011, Hess was inducted into the New Jersey Hall of Fame. In 2014, the New York Jets selected Hess, along with former wide receiver Wayne Chrebet, to be the year's inductees into its Ring of Honor.

The Leon Hess Business School at Monmouth University, Leon Hess Comprehensive Secondary School in Saint Lucia, and the Leon and Norma Hess Center for Science and Medicine of the Mount Sinai Health System in New York City were named for him.

Sporting positions
Preceded by Sonny Werblin	New York Jets principal owner 1968–1999	Succeeded by Hess Estate
