= Hess Corporation =

American global energy company

Coordinates: 40.7579°N 73.9824°W

- Formerly: Amerada Hess Corporation
- Type: Subsidiary
- Industry: Oil and gas
- Founded: 1919; 107 years ago
- Founder: Leon Hess
- Headquarters: New York City, United States
- Area served: Worldwide
- Key people: Sarah Hess (CEO)
- Products: Crude oil; petrochemicals; natural gas; propane
- Revenue: ▲US$12.9 billion (2024)
- Operating income: ▲US$4.66 billion (2024)
- Net income: ▲US$2.77 billion (2024)
- Total assets: ▲US$26.6 billion (2024)
- Total equity: ▲US$11.2 billion (2024)
- Number of employees: 1,797 (2024)
- Parent: Chevron Corporation
- Website: hess.com

Hess Corporation (formerly Amerada Hess Corporation) is an American global independent energy company involved in the exploration and production of crude oil and natural gas. It was formed by the merger of Hess Oil and Chemical and Amerada Petroleum in 1968. Leon Hess was CEO from the early 1960s until 1995, after which his son John B Hess succeeded him as chairman and CEO. The company agreed to be acquired by rival oil company Chevron in October 2023, and the acquisition closed in July 2025.

Headquartered in New York City, the company ranked 394th in the 2016 annual ranking of Fortune 500 corporations. In 2020, the Forbes Global 2000 ranked Hess as the 1,253rd largest public company in the world.

The company had exploration and production operations on-shore in the United States (North Dakota) and Libya; and off-shore in the United States (Gulf of Mexico), Canada, South America (Guyana and Suriname) and Southeast Asia (Malaysia and the Joint Development Area of Malaysia and Thailand).

== History ==
=== Amerada Corporation ===
In 1919, British oil entrepreneur Lord Cowdray formed the Amerada Corporation to explore oil production in North America. The firm was incorporated on February 7, 1920, in Delaware as a holding company for its principal subsidiary, the Amerada Petroleum Corporation. The oil producer experienced growth during most of the 1920s, hitting a peak in 1926 with a net income of US$4.9 million. However, in the years leading to the Great Depression, weakness in the oil markets contributed to sluggish profits. The aftermath of the Wall Street Crash of 1929 aggravated an already unsteady oil industry. In the first quarter of 1930, the company experienced a minor loss. The early years of the Depression were a struggle against wavering demand and overproduction in some regions. Later into the 1930s, financial forecasts for Amerada became more positive.

In December 1941, the company reorganized by merging the holding company and the principal operating subsidiary, Amerada Petroleum Corporation, into a simplified operating company. The new entity also adopted the former subsidiary's name.

During the 1950s, the company expanded into pipelining and refining. In 1951, it discovered oil in the Bakken formation near Tioga, North Dakota. In 1955, robust post-war growth grew the company to over US$100 million in annual sales. In 1964, Amerada, Shell plc, Marathon, and Continental formed the Oasis Group, a consortium to explore in Libya.

=== Hess Oil and Chemical ===
Hess Oil and Chemical was founded in 1933 by Leon Hess as an operation out of Asbury Park, New Jersey that sold refining leftovers to hotels as heating fuel. In 1938, he purchased land in Perth Amboy for his first oil storage terminal and in 1958 opened the company's first refinery, located in Port Reading. The company went public in 1962 after merging with the Cletrac Corporation, a company that made farm equipment.

In October 1966, the company opened an oil refinery on Saint Croix of the US Virgin Islands under Hess Oil Virgin Islands Corporation.

In 1966, Hess paid $100 million to the British government to acquire 10% of Amerada. Albert Levinson became the senior vice president and designed the modern-day Hess logo.

=== Amerada and Hess merger ===
In December 1968, Hess and Amerada announced plans for a merger. Some Amerada stockholders, led by Morton Adler, criticized the arrangement as being too favorable for Hess. Before the stockholder vote, Phillips Petroleum, an integrated oil firm, approached Amerada with its merger proposal, but the offer was declined in March 1969. Still interested, Phillips nonetheless stated it would not carry out a lawsuit against the proposed Hess deal.

Hess, fearing such a strategy, made a cash tender offer of US$140 million for an additional 1.1 million shares of Amerada, which would double its holding in the company. The new claims would be employed in a May stockholder vote deciding the merger's fate. The voting took place amidst shareholder rancor that, in addition to echoing Adler's arguments, objected to Amerada's financing of the recently completed tender offer.

Hess planned to cancel the shares, and the newly formed company would absorb the cost of the acquisition. One shareholder at the meeting quipped, "It looks to me as if Hess is buying Amerada with Amerada's money." Proponents of the deal won and the $2.4 billion merger combining a pure production company with a refinery and marketer operation was completed.

However, the controversy was not yet extinguished. A federal class-action lawsuit was filed in 1972, which claimed that the proxy vote information was misleading. In 1976, a court agreed that the company falsely claimed to have considered each company's assets as a reason for the merger.

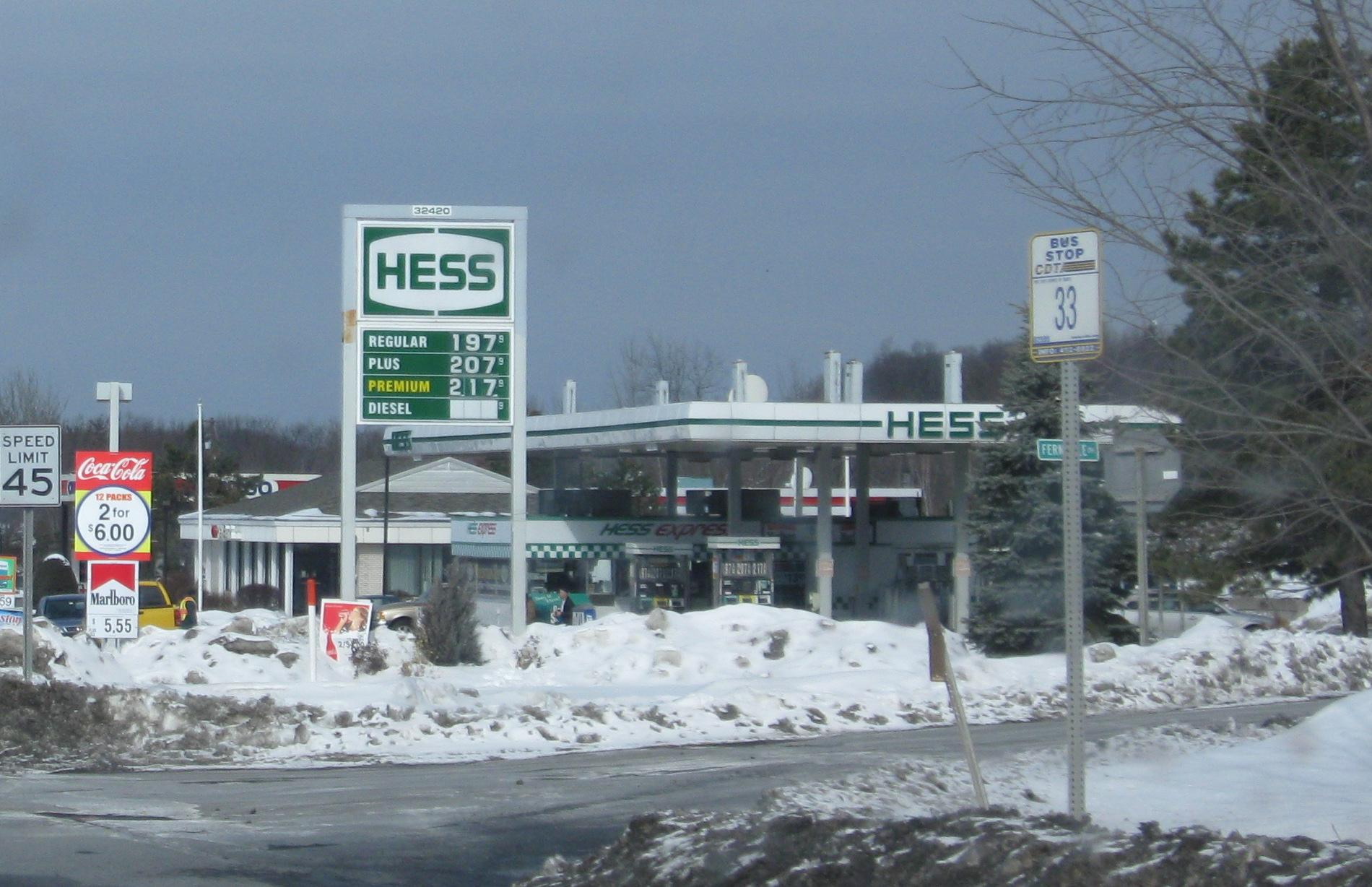
A former Hess station in Rensselaer County, New York in 2009

=== Amerada Hess Corporation ===
In May 1970, Amerada Hess drilled the first successful wildcat well in Prudhoe Bay on Alaska's North Slope. In August, it joined with seven other companies to form Alyeska Pipeline Service Company in order to build and operate the $900‐million, 800‐mile Trans-Alaska Pipeline System.

In October 1970, Hess stepped down from his role as chairman and CEO. However, after profits declined, he took back his roles in August 1972. The company's president and executive vice president resigned. In October 1974, Hess announced it would close its refinery in Port Reading, New Jersey. To compensate, the company would expand its activities at its Virgin Islands and Mississippi locations, including an $18 million container port in St. Croix.

In December 1981, Hess joined with Mobil in its bid to acquire Marathon and avoid antitrust concerns. However the deal ultimately fell through and United States Steel Corporation proved to be the winning bid. Hess stepped down from his role as CEO in May 1982. Company president Philip Kramer replaced him, while Hess remained chairman. In November 1985, the company acquired the London-based Monsanto Oil Company from Monsanto to increase its interests in two oilfields in the North Sea. In July 1988, Amerada Hess announced it would acquire Whitehall Ltd., a British oil and gas exploration company, from Pearson PLC for $160 million. The deal included Whitehall's interests in the Ivanhoe, Rob Roy, Waverley, Forties, Alba, and Anglia oil fields, as well as significant North Sea gas reserves.

In September 1990, Amerada Hess acquired British Petroleum's stake in Norway's Brage oil field, which was due to start producing in 1994. The company closed a Mississippi refinery in January 1994, eliminating 160 jobs. In October, Amerada Hess formed a joint venture with Gabon to gain access to the Rabi-Kounga oil field. In 1995, Hess stepped down as chairman and CEO of the company, and was replaced by his son, John Hess. He died in May 1999.

In April 1996, Petro-Canada paid $538 million to Amerada Hess Corp. for all shares of its Amerada Hess Canada Ltd subsidiary. In May, Hess announced it would sell nine United States oil and natural gas fields and use the expected $324 million in proceeds to pay off debt. It also allowed the company to focus on its more profitable operations in the Virgin Islands and North Sea. In February 1998, Hess sold 50% of its Virgin Islands refinery for $625 million. Operations were taken over by Hovensa LLC, a joint venture between Hess and the Venezuelan state-owned PDVSA.

In February 2000, Hess acquired the Meadville Corporation and rebranded all 178 Merit gas stations as Hess. The Merit gas station chain was primarily located in the Boston, New York, and Philadelphia markets. In April, the company spent $555 million for a 49% stake in the state-owned Sonatrach to develop the El Gassi, El Agreb and Zotti fields in Algeria.

In July 2001, Amerada Hess purchased Triton Energy Limited for $2.6 billion in order to put more focus on exploration. After the deal, the company's oil production increased to 535,000 barrels a day and 38% of its reserves were outside of the US and North Sea. Triton's major oil and gas assets in West Africa, Latin America and Southeast Asia would strengthen its exploration and production business and provide access to long life international reserves. Hess also stated that the purchase was expected to immediately increase the company's per-day barrel output by more than 25 percent.

Similarly in 2001, Amerada Hess entered into a joint venture with A.T. Williams Oil Co. of Winston-Salem, North Carolina. The company and the gas stations were changed and called WilcoHess. After the joint merger, there existed some 1200 WilcoHess stations.

Following on the heels of the Triton purchase, energy prices fell and global economies weakened. Amerada Hess struggled through the following years, and in 2002 posted a US$218 million loss due primarily to a US$530 million charge relating to its write-down of the Ceiba oil field. In March 2002, TXU Europe bought the UK retail gas and electricity business of Amerada Hess. It also sold its 1.5 percent stake in the Trans-Alaska Pipeline System to ConocoPhillips in February 2003. In2June, the company 6 oil and gas fields in the Gulf of Mexico to the Anadarko Petroleum Corporation and agreed to trade some properties with the EnCana Corporation. Further, Amerada Hess cut exploration and production jobs by 30 percent and reduced office space in Aberdeen, Scotland, and London.

However, from 2003 through 2006, Amerada Hess posted steadily increasing profits as the company reported US$1.920 billion in net income.

=== Hess Corporation ===
In May 2006, Amerada Hess Corporation changed its name to Hess Corporation. In May 2010, Hess announced a joint venture with Toreador Resources of France to develop Toreador's one million gross acres in France's Paris Basin. In July, Hess announced it would acquire the independent American Oil & Gas for $445 million.

=== Proxy battle with Elliott Associates ===
In the first half of 2013, Hess was subjected to a proxy battle against activist investor Elliott Associates, which owned 4% of its stock at the time. Elliott criticized Hess for being "distracted" from oil exploration and production by other activities, wasting capital, and relying too heavily on the Hess family and their allies.

In January 2013, Elliott announced its intentions to acquire additional Hess stock. It also called on Hess to sell certain assets and asked Hess investors to vote for five new directors as part of an effort to reconfigure the oil firm and thus boost its share price. "Buried within Hess Corp. is one of the premier U.S. resource play-focused companies," Elliott wrote. Another Hess stockholder, Relational Investors, came out in support of Elliott.

A point of contention was that several members of the company's board were close associates of the Hess family and did not have experience in oil. These included former New Jersey governor Thomas Kean, former Georgia senator Samuel A. Nunn, and Gregory Hill, the president of worldwide exploration and production for Hess. Elliott announced five candidates for board seats.

In March, Hess announced that it was acting on some of Elliott's suggestions. It replaced six directors, raised its dividends, and introduced a stock buyback. The company also announced its plan to sell off the Hess stations division and all other consumer-facing endeavors. However, Elliott said that Hess' changes fell far short of what was needed. Relational was also unimpressed. In April, it was reported that Hess would close its London office on Elliott's advice.

By May, Elliott had the support of influential advisors Institutional Shareholder Services and Glass Lewis. The company announced it would split the chief executive and president roles in a move to appease shareholders. John B. Hess remained as chief executive. A deal was finally reached hours before the company's annual investor meeting with shareholders. Hess agreed to give Elliott three board seats if it supported the company's five nominees.

As of the fourth quarter of 2014, Elliott owned 17.8 million shares of Hess, worth $1.3 billion, making it Elliott's largest holding.

=== Sale of downstream assets ===
On January 18, 2012, the company announced that it would close the Hovensa refinery in St. Croix, United States Virgin Islands by mid-February 2012. The refinery would continue to serve as a storage terminal. Hess took a $525 million charge against its fourth-quarter 2011 earnings due to the shutdown. In May, the company sold its 15.67% interest in Schiehallion oil field, North Sea, to Royal Dutch Shell. In January 2013, Hess announced its plan to sell off its network of 19 storage terminals located on the East Coast and St. Lucia.

By the end of February 2013, and while Elliott waged its proxy fight, Hess permanently closed its Port Reading, New Jersey petroleum refinery. Gas prices had risen to their highest levels since October 2012 and Hess said it would lay off 170 of 217 employees at the plant, exit the refinery business and look for a buyer for its 19 storage terminals.

On March 4, 2013, Hess announced that it would sell its domestic refineries and retail operations and would be "fully exiting the Company's downstream businesses, including retail, energy marketing, and energy trading." The 1,350 gas stations in the Northeast, Carolinas, and Florida accounted for just 4% of its revenue. It also noted that Hess would sell its holdings in Indonesia and Thailand.

Hess would focus exclusively on oil production, following a trend in the oil industry for companies to spin off their downstream assets and focus on their more profitable upstream business; ConocoPhillips and Marathon Oil also made similar spinoffs in recent years with Phillips 66 and Marathon Petroleum, respectively.

In April 2013, Hess Corp announced it would be selling its Russian unit to Lukoil for $2.05 billion. In July 2013, Hess Corp said it would sell its energy marketing unit to UK firm Centrica for around $1.03 billion. In July 2013, Hess agreed to sell its wholesale and retail oil, natural gas and electricity marketing business to Direct Energy.

In October 2013, Hess Corp announced it would sell its East Coast and St. Lucia storage terminal network to Buckeye Partners LP for $850 million.

In December 2013, Hess Corp announced that it was selling its Indonesian assets to an Indonesian petroleum consortium. By the end of the

On January 8, 2014, Hess filed for a tax-free spin-off of its gas station network. The newly formed company was to be known as Hess Retail and would include over 1,200 stores throughout the Eastern United States. Before completing the spin-off, Marathon Petroleum subsidiary Speedway LLC announced on May 22, 2014, that it would acquire the retail unit of Hess Corp for $2.87 billion. Following the closure of the acquisition in late 2014, it was announced that all Hess gas stations were to be rebranded as Speedway gas stations by the end of 2017, although a few stations ended up taking on another company.

The company also sold its 50% interests in the Bayonne Energy Center and Newark Energy Center, as well as its 50% interest in Hess Energy Trading Company (HETCO) to Oaktree Capital. HETCO is now known as Hartree Partners.

As of October 2014, Hess had completed its multi-year transformation of exiting all downstream operations, and was a solely an exploration and production company; doing generated $13 billion for the company.

=== Hess in Guyana ===
In April 2015, ExxonMobil announced its discovery of a significant oil reserve off the coast of Guyana in South America. At the time, it was estimated to contain more than 700 million barrels of oil. Hess began acquiring interest in the reserve in 2018. By 2022, estimates were increased to 11 billion barrels.

=== Acquisition by Chevron ===
In October 2023, Chevron Corporation announced that it would acquire Hess Corporation in an all-stock deal for $53 billion, or $60 billion including debt. Since this would give Chevron control of Hess' 30% interest in the Guyana oil fields, Exxon protested and claimed to have a right of first refusal to acquire those assets.

In March 2024, Exxon and CNOOC, the third partner in the offshore Stabroek block, filed arbitration cases with the International Chamber of Commerce to stop the deal. Hess shareholders, meanwhile, approved the acquisition that May. The arbitration hearing was heard in May 2025.

In September 2024, under the Biden Administration, the Federal Trade Commission conditioned approval of the merger upon John B. Hess being prohibited from serving on the company's board of directors due to his past communications with OPEC.After the transition to the Trump Administration in 2025, the reshuffled FTC lifted the prohibition on Hess joining Chevron's board on July 17, 2025, just one day before the completion of the merger.

On July 18, 2025, Chevron reported that it completed its purchase of Hess Corporation and Hess was subsequently appointed to Chevron's board of directors.

== Environmental record ==
Hess outlined in its 2006 Corporate Sustainability Report a "four-element" strategy to reduce and control greenhouse gas emissions. The strategy's steps included monitoring, measuring, managing, and mitigating the emissions. The company intends to improve its environmental impact through reporting results, increasing energy efficiency and recovery, and participating in carbon capture and trading. In December 2022, the company was added to the Dow Jones Sustainability World Index.

=== In New York and New Jersey ===
In August 1976, 600 gallons of oil seeped into the Arthur Kill and Raritan River when a barge heading to Hess' Perth Amboy facility struck a rock. A month later, Amerada Hess and eight other oil companies that operated in the area, announced plans to form a mutual aid cooperative that would clean up major oil spills in the harbor.

On October 28, 1990, a barge containing 31,000 barrels (4,900 m^{3}) of kerosene struck a reef in the Hudson River, spilling 163,000 US gallons (620 m^{3}) of fuel. Immediately, Hess assumed responsibility for the cleanup; the Coast Guard worked alongside the barge's owner to clean and contain the spill. Coast Guard official Howard Holmes said that 70 percent of the spill would be gone in three days due to the natural evaporation rate of kerosene. Even though most kerosene evaporates, toxic chemicals such as benzene stay in the water and harm fish.

In September 1990, 5,000 gallons of oil spilled into the Arthur Kill when a six million-gallon Hess Oil tank at the company's Perth Amboy Terminal collapsed.

Following a 2008 New York State Department of Environmental Conservation (DEC) agreement, the Hess Corporation agreed to pay $1.1 million in fines and also "bring 65 gasoline stations and oil storage facilities into compliance with state requirements." The agreement addressed more than 100 violations at 65 gas stations and Hess' Brooklyn major oil storage facility. The agreement was aimed at resolving Hess's violations in the DEC's New York City and lower Hudson Valley regions.

In April 2012, a Hess pipeline burst near Pennsauken, New Jersey. While most of the oil spilled into a containment ditch, approximately 100 gallons went into the Delaware River.

=== In Alaska ===
Following the Exxon Valdez oil spill in March 1989, the State of Alaska sued Amerada Hess and the other operators of Alyeska Pipeline Service Company for damages done to the Prince William Sound and the region's fisheries-based economy. In 1992, Alyeska paid $31.3 million to settle state and Federal claims for damages to the natural resources. In July 1993, the companies agreed to pay $98 million to native Alaskans.

=== In the Gulf of Mexico ===
In June 2005, Hess evacuated its Breton Sound 51 platform in advance of Tropical Storm Arlene. Upon returning, workers discovered a damaged storage tank that leaked 500 gallons of oil into the Gulf of Mexico just off of Louisiana. When oil washed ashore on a rookery on nearby West Breton Island, part of the Breton National Wildlife Refuge, 450 endangered brown pelicans were killed. When including future generations that would have existed if not for the spill, it was estimated that over 1,300 fledgling pelicans were lost. More than 300 pelicans were washed and rehabilitated over the next three months. In November 2018, Hess agreed to pay $8.7 million to settle a federal and state lawsuit over the spill. The money was added to the $72 million plan to rebuild North Breton Island following the BP oil spill.

In a 2008 water contamination case against several major US oil companies, the Hess Corporation was forced to pay part of a $422 million settlement. The case was filed by 153 public water providers in 17 states against the oil companies "over drinking water contamination caused by the gasoline additive Methyl Tertiary Butyl Ether (MTBE)". The settlement also stipulated that the settling parties pay their share of treatment costs of the plaintiffs' wells that may become contaminated or require treatment for the next 30 years.

=== In North Dakota ===
In February 2015, Hess reported over 40,000 gallons of spilled brine between two well sites about three miles apart in North Dakota. Both were caused by opened valves, which the company referred to as acts of vandalism.

In July 2016, Hess reported a 32,000-gallon spill of produced water north of Tioga, North Dakota. In March 2021, Hess paid a fine for a Clean Water Act violation stemming from an October 2015 inspection at its Tioga gas plant.

In August 2022, a North Dakota pipeline owned by Hess experienced a wastewater spill. Originally reported by the company as a 200-barrel spill from August 12, investigators determined that it was actually closer to a 34,000-barrel spill dating back to three weeks prior with evidence of groundwater contamination.

On December 5, 2022, more than 7,800 gallons of propylene glycol and more than 4,400 gallons of produced water spilled from a Hess pipeline near Ray, North Dakota.

=== In the US Virgin Islands ===
The Hess refinery facility in the US Virgin Islands opened in the 1960s. By 1982, the company identified underground contamination that ultimately released at least 300,000 barrels of petrochemicals into the groundwater and polluted the island's aquifer. Recovery and treatment wells began pumping in 1987 to reclaim the oil that had been lost. In September 1989, the facility was hit by Hurricane Hugo, resulting in two major oil spills on the island of St. Croix. Roughly 10,000 barrels of oil were discharged from damaged storage tanks at the Hess Oil Virgin Islands Corporation, and 14,000 barrels of oil were discharged from the Virgin Islands Water and Power Authority facility in Christiansted.

In 1994, the EPA determined the facility's underground pipes needed to be replaced. In the following years, benzene was vented into the air and mercury was flushed down drains. By 2008, nearly 42 million gallons of free product petroleum had been reclaimed from the on-site groundwater. In December 1996, the company was fined $5.3 million for illegally shipping hazardous waste from the Virgin Islands to Arizona in 1991 and 1992. Hess ultimately halted operations in 2012 and converted the site into a storage facility.

When the U.S. Virgin Islands sued the company in 2015 for $1 billion for environmental damages, Hess's Hovensa facility declared bankruptcy. This meant it did not pay for a full cleanup and only paid $4.7 million to settle four class-action suits.

In December 2023, Hess Corporation was ordered to pay $150 million to hundreds of former St. Croix refinery workers and their families who were injured by asbestos exposure. Litigation had been ongoing since 1997.

== Antitrust lawsuit ==
In January 2024, a group of three Americans filed a class action lawsuit accusing Hess, along with seven other US oil and gas producers, of an illegal price-fixing scheme. The plaintiffs alleged attempts to constrain production of shale oil that led to consumers in the US paying more for gasoline for their auto transportation than they would have in a competitive market.

== Locations ==
Before the March 4, 2013 announcement of its withdrawal from refining and retail sales of petroleum products, Hess operated gas stations across the US.

In May 2014, Speedway LLC, a subsidiary of Marathon Petroleum Company, announced it would purchase Hess Corporation's retail business for $2.6 billion. Hess had 1,342 locations across the Eastern United States. The conversion from Hess branding to Speedway branding took place over the course of 2015. This also included all the WilcoHess locations, which Hess had acquired outright shortly before exiting the retail business. Subsequently, in 2016 Speedway and Pilot Flying J entered into a joint venture called PFJ Southeast LLC, which manages all of the former WilcoHess truck stops; the locations are managed by Pilot and were rebranded as either Pilot or Flying J. As of 2018, Hess locations remained in a few states including Connecticut and Pennsylvania.

In 2021, 7-Eleven acquired Speedway from Marathon, bringing the former Hess locations into the fold. Due to antitrust reasons, the Federal Trade Commission forced 7-Eleven and Marathon to divest 291 Speedway locations to third party buyers; the majority of those locations were former Hess locations in Florida and New York, as well as several in California that Marathon had acquired in its 2018 acquisition of Andeavor.

== Toy trucks ==
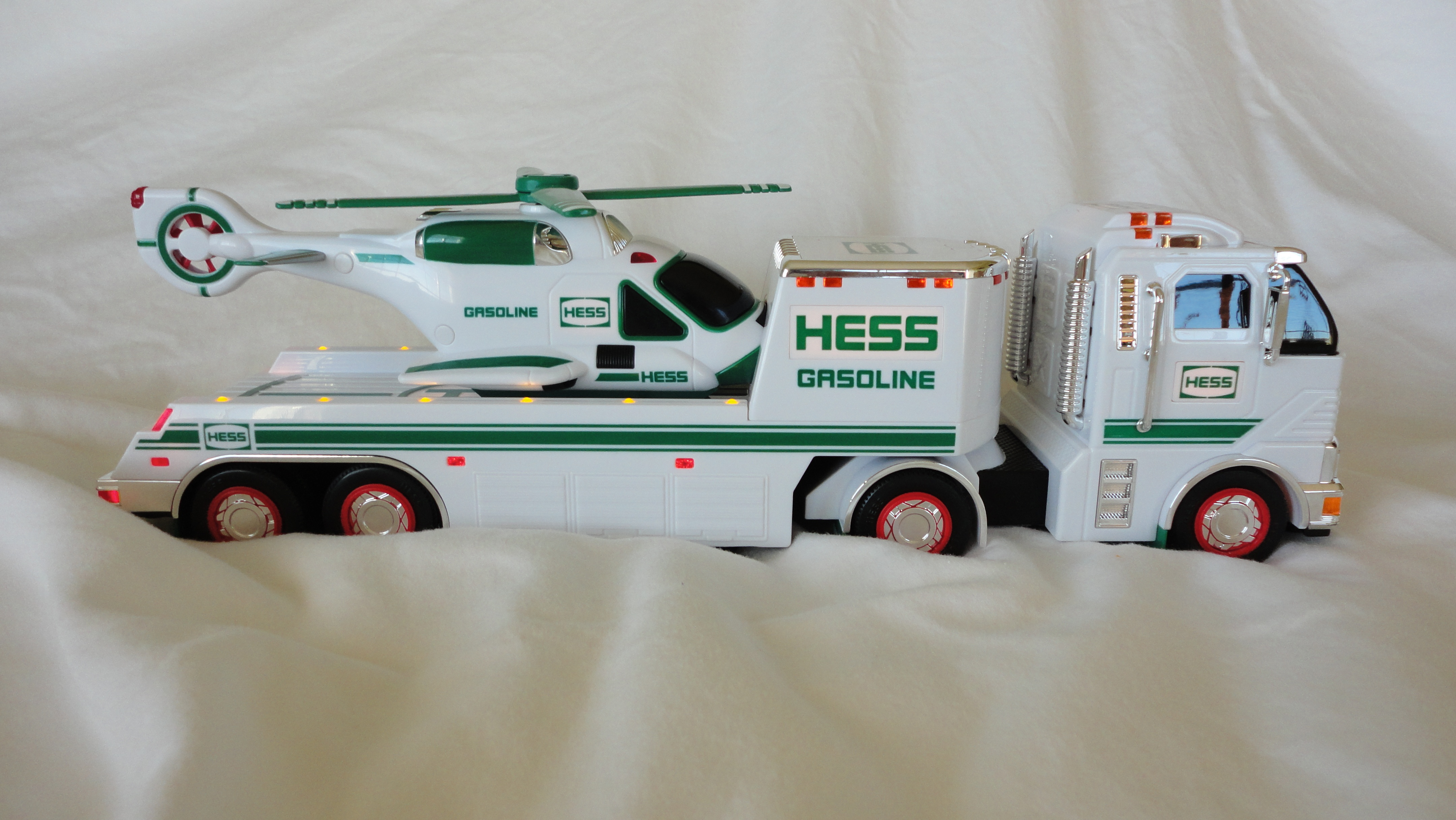
2006 Hess toy truck

In 1964, Hess Oil and Chemical began selling a toy tanker truck at its gas stations. This release would become a series of toy trucks and other vehicles released before Christmas each year, sold through gas station locations and online.

== See also ==
- Alaska v. Amerada Hess
