= History of the New York Jets =

Sports team history

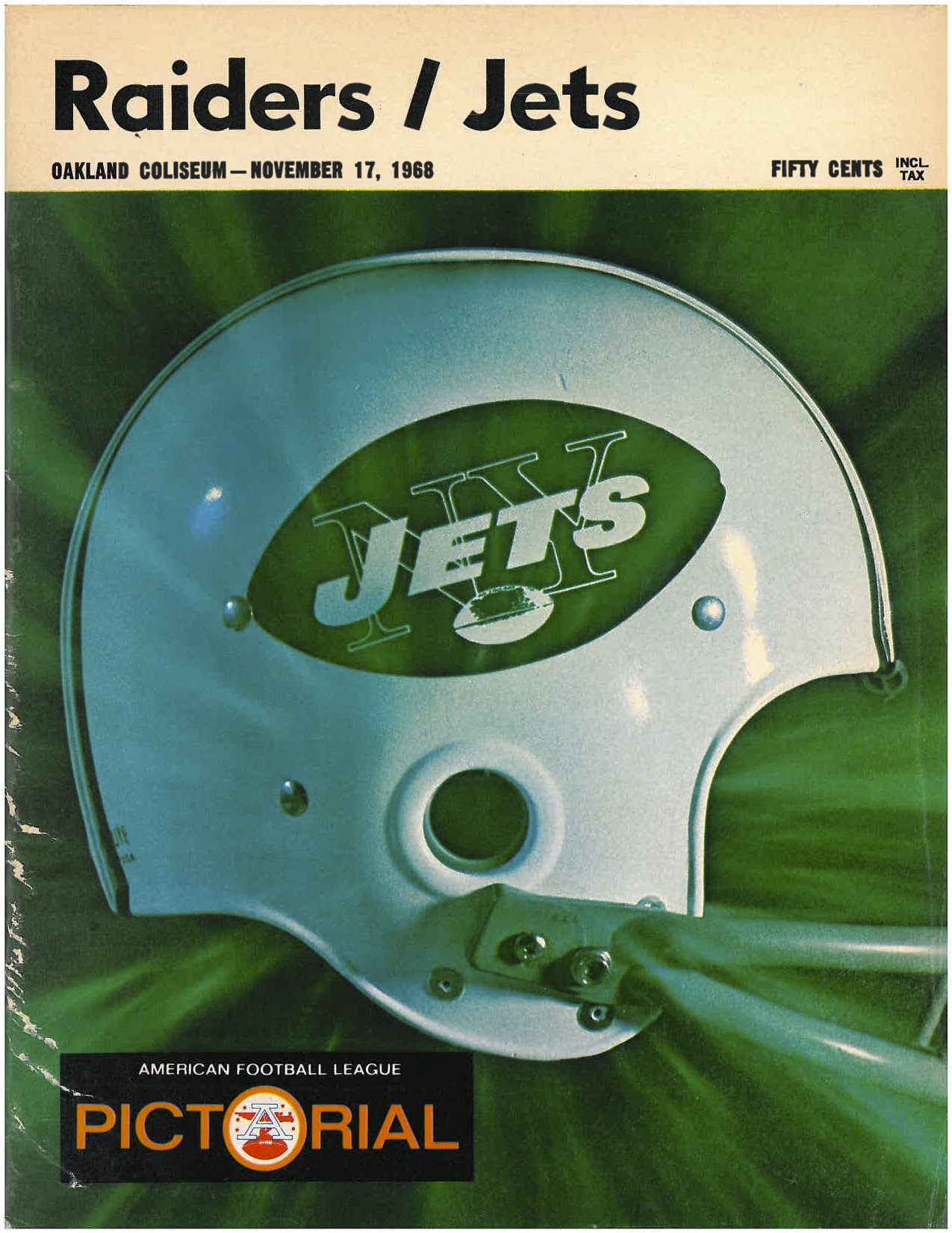
1968 game program cover, depicting a Jets helmet during their AFL years. From the Heidi Game on November 17, 1968.

The history of the New York Jets American football team began in 1959 with the founding of the Titans of New York, an original member of the American Football League (AFL); they began actual play the following year. The team had little success in its early years. After playing three seasons at the Polo Grounds, the team changed its name to the New York Jets, and moved into newly built Shea Stadium in 1964. In January 1965, the Jets signed University of Alabama quarterback Joe Namath to a then-record contract. The team showed gradual improvement in the late 1960s, posting its first winning record in 1967 and winning its only American Football League championship in 1968. By winning the title, New York earned the right to play in Super Bowl III against the champions of the National Football League (NFL), the Baltimore Colts. The Jets defeated the Colts in the game; in the aftermath of the upset, the AFL was deemed a worthy partner to the NFL as the two leagues merged.

Following the merger, the Jets fell into mediocrity; Namath was dogged by injuries through much of his later career. In 1981, New York qualified for the playoffs for the first time in the post-Namath era. They reached the AFC Championship Game in 1982; they were defeated on a rain-soaked Orange Bowl field by the Miami Dolphins. Beginning with the 1984 season, the team played in New Jersey's Giants Stadium. The team started the 1986 season with a 10–1 record, but the injury-plagued Jets lost their last five regular season games and relinquished a ten-point fourth quarter lead to lose in double overtime to the Cleveland Browns in the playoffs.

In the following eleven seasons, New York had limited success, reaching the playoffs only once and enduring a string of disastrous seasons, including a 1–15 record in 1996. The following year, the Jets hired two-time Super Bowl winning coach Bill Parcells. The new coach guided the team to its most successful season since the merger in 1998; the Jets finished 12–4 and reached the AFC Championship Game, in which they fell to the Denver Broncos. The team made five playoff appearances in the 2000s, their most of any decade. In 2009 and 2010, the Jets achieved back-to-back appearances in the AFC Championship Game, losing to the Indianapolis Colts and Pittsburgh Steelers, but since then have not made the playoffs. In 2010, the team began to play in MetLife Stadium, constructed near the now-demolished Giants Stadium.

== Origins and the Polo Grounds era (1959–1964) ==
=== Organization and first season ===
In 1959, young oilmen Lamar Hunt and Bud Adams sought a National Football League franchise. They found that NFL expansion required a unanimous vote of existing team owners, so there was little likelihood of convincing the NFL to expand. The two men attempted to acquire the Chicago Cardinals, intending to move the franchise to Dallas, where there was no NFL team. Cardinals co-owner Walter Wolfner, who owned the team with his wife, Violet Bidwill Wolfner, was unwilling to sell majority control. During the discussions, Walter Wolfner mentioned the names of other wealthy bidders seeking to acquire the Cardinals. On the flight home, Hunt and Adams decided to recruit the other bidders as owners of teams in a new professional football league.

New York City attorney William Shea was attempting to create the Continental League, a rival league to Major League Baseball (MLB). Hunt met with him, and Shea suggested Harry Wismer, a former sportscaster who had been a minority shareholder in both the Washington Redskins and Detroit Lions, as a potential New York franchise owner for the new football league. Wismer was willing; he was feuding at the time with the Redskins' principal owner, George Preston Marshall, and realized he would never own the Washington franchise. Wismer, while wealthy, was not nearly as rich as the other potential team owners.

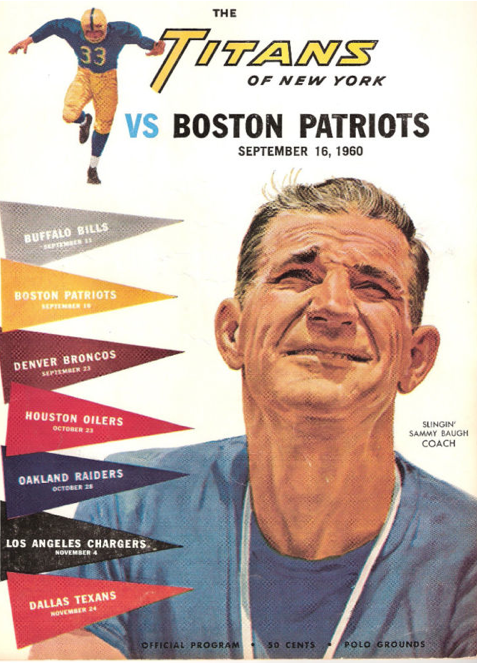
Game program cover for the Titans, 1960, depicting Coach Sammy Baugh. He posted a .500 record with the Titans, for thirty-five years the franchise's best.

On August 14, 1959, the league held an organizational meeting and announced its plans; eight days later it announced its name: the American Football League (AFL), the fourth league to take that name. Among the charter members was a New York franchise owned by Wismer, dubbed the "Titans of New York." On November 24, 1959, the AFL held its first draft; the Titans selected Notre Dame quarterback George Izo as their first pick. The league announced a policy, formulated by Wismer, that it would negotiate with a network for a single television contract to cover all the teams, the first league to do so. On December 7, the Titans hired Steve Sebo as general manager. Sebo had just been fired as coach at the University of Pennsylvania, despite taking the Quakers to the Ivy League championship. On December 17, the Titans announced at a press conference that "one of the biggest names in the history of football" would be soon be named as their head coach. Although Wismer was prone to hyperbole, in this case he told the truth: New York had persuaded former Redskins star quarterback and punter Sammy Baugh to be its coach. Since his retirement as a player, Baugh had coached at tiny Hardin–Simmons University, where he built a strong football program that sent a team to the 1958 Sun Bowl. Before appearing at the press conference, Baugh demanded his entire salary of $20,000 for 1960, in cash. The Titans accommodated him.

Wismer sought a place for his team to play, but was only able to secure the decrepit Polo Grounds, which had been without a major tenant since the departure of the New York Giants baseball team in 1957. The stadium stood on the northern tip of Manhattan, across the Harlem River from Yankee Stadium, where the New York Giants NFL team played.

Baugh invited some 100 players to the Titans' first training camp, which opened at the University of New Hampshire on July 9, 1960. As NFL teams cut players from their training camps, many were invited to the Titans' or other AFL teams' training camps as the teams sought to fill their 35-man rosters. The franchise's first preseason game took place on August 6, 1960, against the Los Angeles Chargers at Los Angeles Memorial Coliseum. The Titans kicked off to begin the game, and Chargers running back Paul Lowe returned the kick 105 yards for a touchdown. New York lost, 27–7. On September 11, 1960, the opening regular season game was played in a heavy downpour, the remains of Hurricane Donna. Water poured off Coogan's Bluff, situated above the Polo Grounds, swamping the field, which had poor drainage. The Titans' offense was less affected by the mud than that of the visiting Buffalo Bills. The Titans won the game 27–3 before a crowd of 9,607 (5,727 paid attendance). The following week New York played another home game, against the Boston Patriots. On the first of many occasions when the team would lose a game after taking a big lead, the Titans were ahead 24–7 in the second half. With the lead reduced to 24–21, the Titans punted from deep in their own territory with seconds left. The punter, Rick Sapienza, fumbled the snap, and the Patriots recovered in the end zone for the victory. The following week, with the Titans playing at the Denver Broncos, New York blocked a punt on the final play to win the game. In their fourth game, New York had a two-point lead when it fumbled with fifteen seconds left against the Dallas Texans. This set off a scramble for the ball, which the Titans recovered as time ran out. Viewers in New York were spared the harrowing ending; in a prelude to the Heidi Game eight years later, the local ABC station had switched to a Walt Disney Davey Crockett special at 6:30 p.m. Many viewers called to complain.

Five weeks into the season, guard Howard Glenn broke his neck during a loss to the Houston Oilers, and died a few hours later, becoming the first player in professional football to die from injuries sustained on the field. New York suffered other injuries as the season progressed, and Wismer lacked the money to replace the injured players. Several players had to play both offense and defense. Wismer had arranged for the Titans to play three home games before their cross-river rivals, the Giants, started their season. This meant the Titans had to play their final three games on the road, and Wismer claimed to have lost $150,000 on the trip. The Titans finished their first season 7–7; according to attendance figures released by the team, the Titans drew an average of 16,375 fans per game. This claim was mocked by the New York press, which reported that the fans had disguised themselves as empty seats. The New York Times estimated that the team had lost $450,000 for the season; in his autobiography, Wismer set the figure at $1.2 million.

=== Bankruptcy and recovery ===
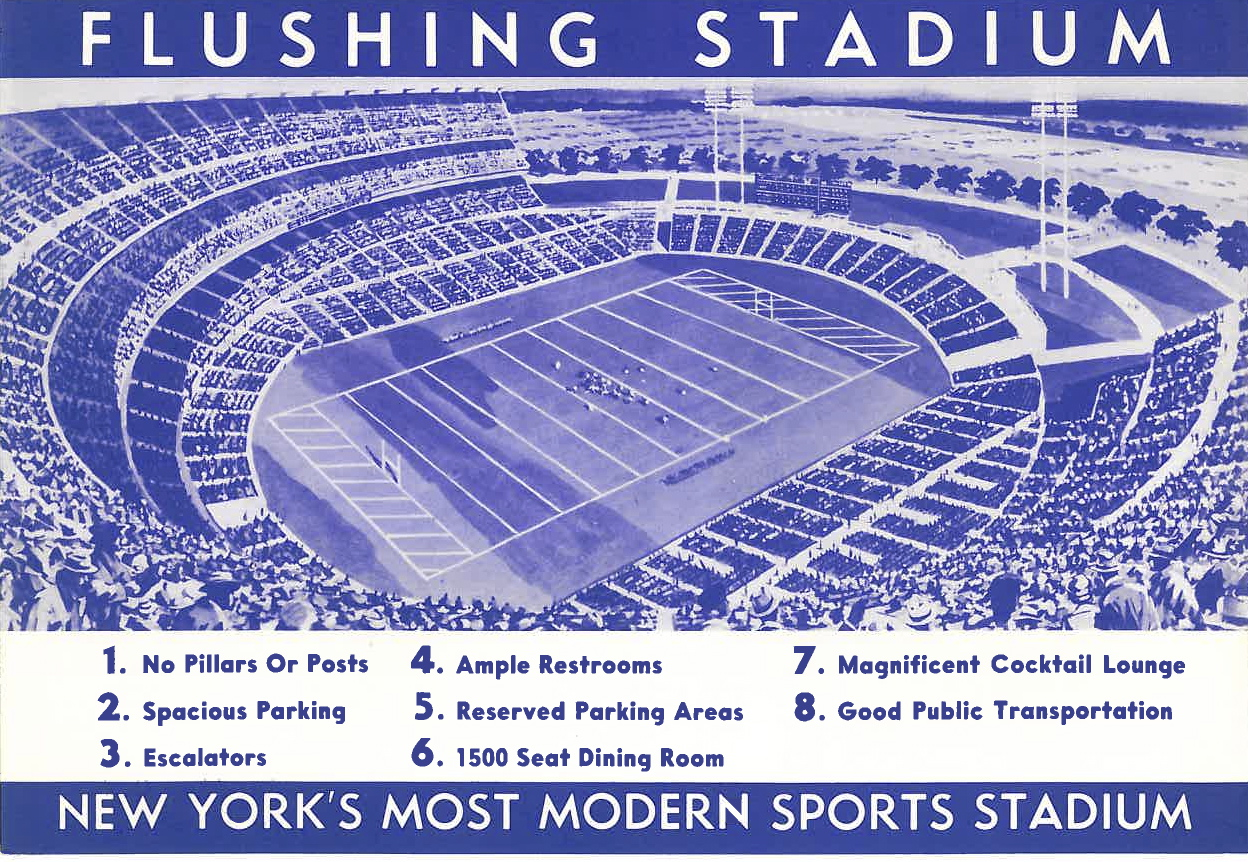
The move to then-modern Shea Stadium, as the Flushing stadium was named, with its promise of ample restrooms and dining, from the decrepit Polo Grounds was a selling point for Titans (and later Jets) tickets. This is reproduced from the 1962 Titans ticket order form.

New York City had proposed to build a new stadium for its franchise in baseball's stillborn Continental League. When that league dissolved and the city was awarded a franchise, dubbed the New York Mets, in the National League, plans for a stadium continued. Wismer had hoped the Titans could play in the new stadium, to be built at Flushing Meadows in Queens, beginning with the 1961 season, but funding difficulties and legal problems delayed construction. Wismer signed a memorandum of understanding in late 1961, although he was unhappy about the terms, which gave the Mets exclusive use of the stadium until they completed their season, and gave the Titans no revenue from parking. According to team doctor James Nicholas, "The lease that Harry signed cost the team quite a lot. It led to [later team owner] Leon Hess going to the Meadowlands." Shea Stadium, as it came to be known, did not open until 1964.

New York hoped to improve its fortunes through the AFL draft, but most Titans draftees signed with the NFL. The Titans won only one preseason game, before a crowd of 73,916 against the Patriots in Philadelphia – free tickets had been given to anyone who bought $10 in groceries at an Acme Market. The New York Times columnist Howard Tuckner described the crowd as "presumably well-fed." The 1961 season, which ended at 7–7, was marked by financial difficulties, as the paychecks of many players bounced; team members learned to hurry to the bank as soon as they received their pay. At the end of the season, Wismer announced that Clyde "Bulldog" Turner would be the Titans' head coach in 1962. Baugh had a contract for 1962 and would have to be paid unless he quit. Although Wismer did not fire Baugh, he also did not tell him where the team's 1962 training camp would be. Baugh showed up anyway, and spent several days acting as kicking coach before Wismer came to the conclusion that Baugh would not quit. The team owner finally agreed to pay the coach his 1962 salary in monthly installments, although Baugh later stated that he was never paid. Baugh's 14–14 record stood as the best mark by any Titans/Jets coach until bettered by Bill Parcells in 1997–1999. In the offseason, Wismer hoped to bring a star to the Polo Grounds by drafting Heisman Trophy winner Ernie Davis of Syracuse, but Davis was drafted by the Redskins instead, traded to the Browns, and died of leukemia before ever playing a professional game.

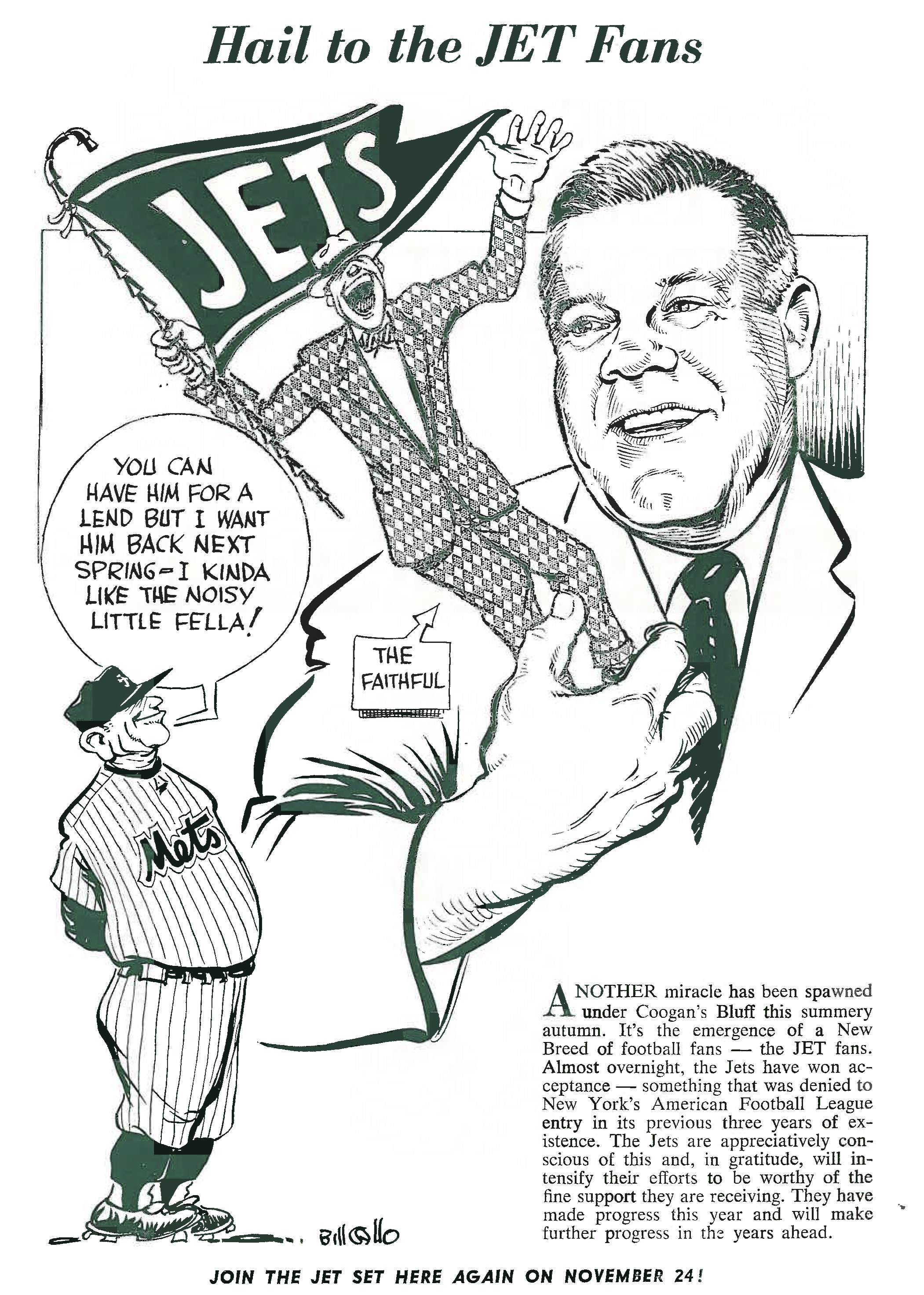
Mets Manager Casey Stengel entrusts the Jets faithful to Jets Head Coach Weeb Ewbank in this cartoon by Bill Gallo for a Jets ad in their own program, 1963.

Turner had never been a head coach before; he faced a team convinced that Baugh had been treated shabbily by Wismer and had difficulty uniting the players. After the Titans split their first two games against Oakland and the Chargers (who had moved to San Diego), the team came home to no paychecks. The players refused to practice, though they worked out on their own on Friday. They then flew to Buffalo and defeated the winless Bills. Public attention in New York was focused on the established local teams, as well as the abysmal record of the fledgling Mets, who nevertheless attracted a cult following. The Titans received little publicity and attracted only 4,719 fans to the home opener against Denver. They were required to wait until the end of the Mets' season before they were allowed to use the Polo Grounds. The Broncos defeated the Titans, 32–10, and Titans quarterback Dean Look suffered a career-ending injury. New York's financial and football woes continued through October 1962, and at the beginning of November, Wismer informed AFL commissioner Joe Foss that he lacked the money to continue operations. The league assumed the cost of running the team for the rest of 1962; Wismer remained in nominal charge. The Titans had little success on the field (the highlight was a 46–45 victory at favored Denver on Thanksgiving), and finished the season insolvent with a 5–9 record.

Wismer agreed to sell the team, but attempted to prevent the sale with a bankruptcy filing. He contended that the move into Shea Stadium would lead to sufficient revenue to make the team profitable. A bankruptcy referee granted the league the authority to sell the team to a five-man syndicate composed of David A. "Sonny" Werblin, Townsend B. Martin, Leon Hess, Donald C. Lillis, and Philip H. Iselin. The sale of the team was approved by a court on March 15 and completed on March 28, 1963. The sale price was $1 million.

On April 15, 1963, the team named Wilbur "Weeb" Ewbank as their head coach and general manager. Ewbank had won back-to-back NFL championships in 1958 and 1959 with the Baltimore Colts, and was one of the most respected coaches in the game. The Colts had fired Ewbank in favor of Don Shula, an untested 33-year-old. Werblin also announced a new name for his team, the Jets, which had been selected from among 500 candidates submitted by "friends, enemies, and advertising agencies". The name was chosen over Dodgers, Borros, and Gothams. The team's colors were changed to green and white. In a press release, the team stated the reason for the selections:

The site of the new stadium between New York's two major airports, symbols of this speedy, modern age, influenced the selection of the new name "Jets". It reflects the spirit of these times and the eagerness of all concerned—players, coach, and owners—to give New York another worthy team. The new team's colors of green and white were chosen for much the same reasons, plus the fact that down through the ages green has always signified hope, freshness and high spirits.

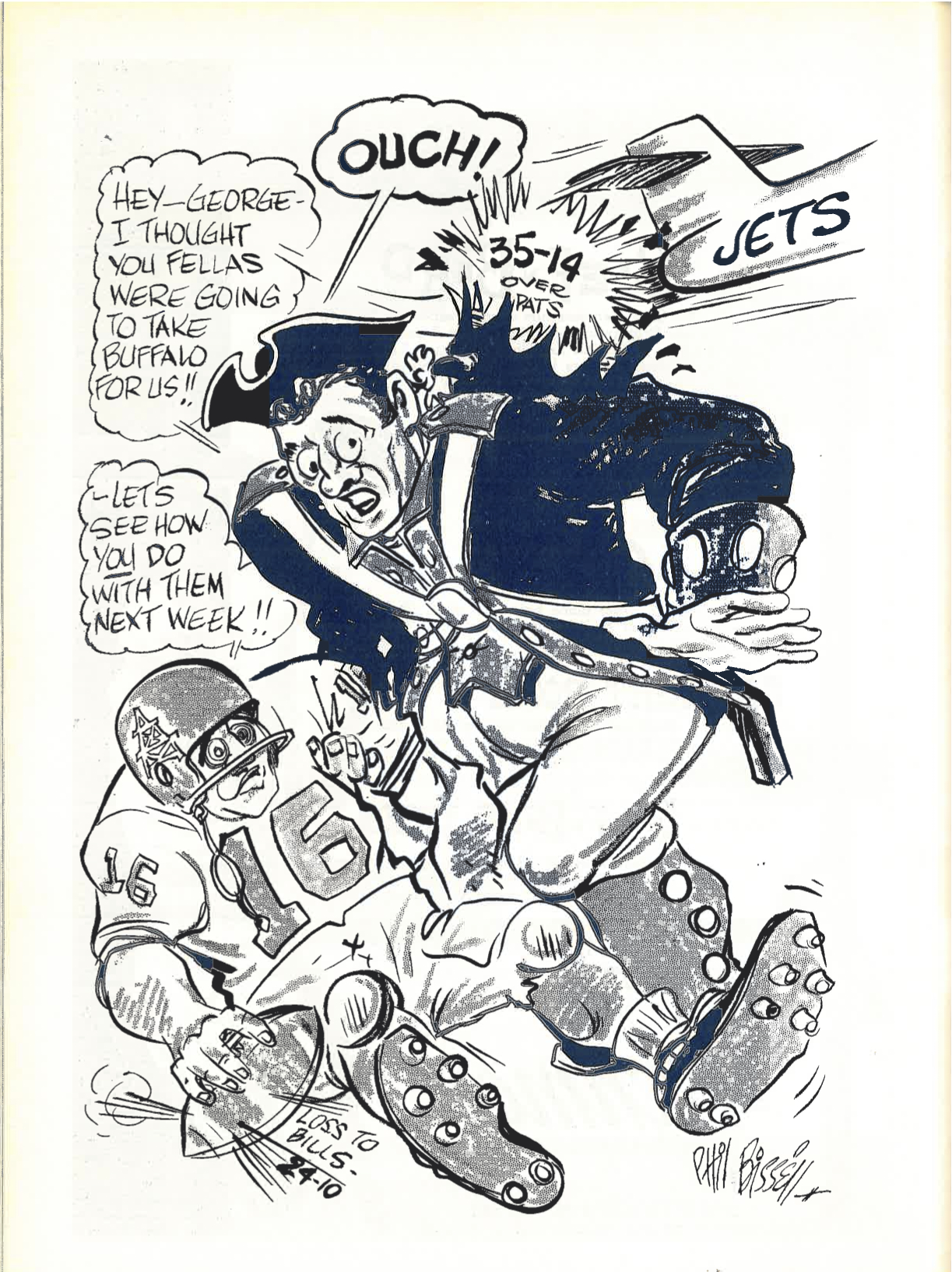
Boston mascot Pat Patriot is bombed by the Jets as he remonstrates with Houston Oiler quarterback George Blanda for his failure to beat the Buffalo Bills, by Phil Bissell for the November 6, 1964 Chargers/Patriots game program.

The new owners faced a chaotic situation. The team had few players under contract, and had made little effort to sign any of their draft picks, most of which had signed with the NFL. The league attempted to strengthen the Jets and the woeful Oakland Raiders by allowing them to select players from the other six teams, and by giving them the first opportunity to sign players cut from NFL rosters. Ewbank, who had discovered Colts great Johnny Unitas at an open tryout, held tryouts for the Jets. Only seven of the participants were invited to training camp, and one, Marshall Starks, made the team as a second-teamer. In mid-July, it was announced that the Jets could not move into Shea Stadium until 1964.

Despite the offseason problems, New York contended for its first division title in a weak AFL East during the 1963 season. By early December, the Jets had compiled a record of 5–5–1, and faced a game in Buffalo with the Bills only a half game ahead. The Jets lost the game, 45–14, as well as their other two remaining games, and finished 5–8–1. Although the Jets drew just over 100,000 fans to the Polo Grounds in seven home games, they quickly sold 17,500 season tickets for the first season in Shea Stadium. The game against the Bills on December 14 was the last sporting event to take place at the Polo Grounds before its demolition in 1964. Running back Matt Snell was drafted by both New York teams, and the Jets were able to sign him.

On September 12, 1964, New York played its home opener at Shea Stadium, defeating Denver 30–6 before a crowd of 52,663, which broke the AFL regular season attendance record by almost 20,000. On November 8, 1964, both the Jets and Giants played home games; both teams sold out their games and the Jets drew 61,929 fans. The Jets posted a home record of 5–1–1 in 1964, but lost all seven road games to finish 5–8–1 again.

As the season concluded, the obvious standout draft choice for both leagues was Alabama quarterback Joe Namath. The Houston Oilers, in last place in the AFL East, had the number-one pick for the AFL. Both the Oilers and Jets realized that the Jets had a far better chance of signing Namath in competition with the NFL team which drafted him (as it turned out, the St. Louis Cardinals, formerly the Chicago Cardinals), and the Jets were able to acquire the number-one pick. Neither the Jets nor the Cardinals could sign Namath until Alabama played its final game of the season, the Orange Bowl, on January 1, 1965. Both the Jets and Cardinals negotiated with Namath's attorney, and when the price got too high for the Cardinals, the Giants secretly acquired Namath's NFL rights. Longtime Jets coach Walt Michaels admitted many years later that the Jets had signed Namath days before the game. On January 2, 1965, the Jets held a press conference to announce Namath's signing.

== "Broadway Joe" era (1965–1976) ==
=== Road to Super Bowl III ===
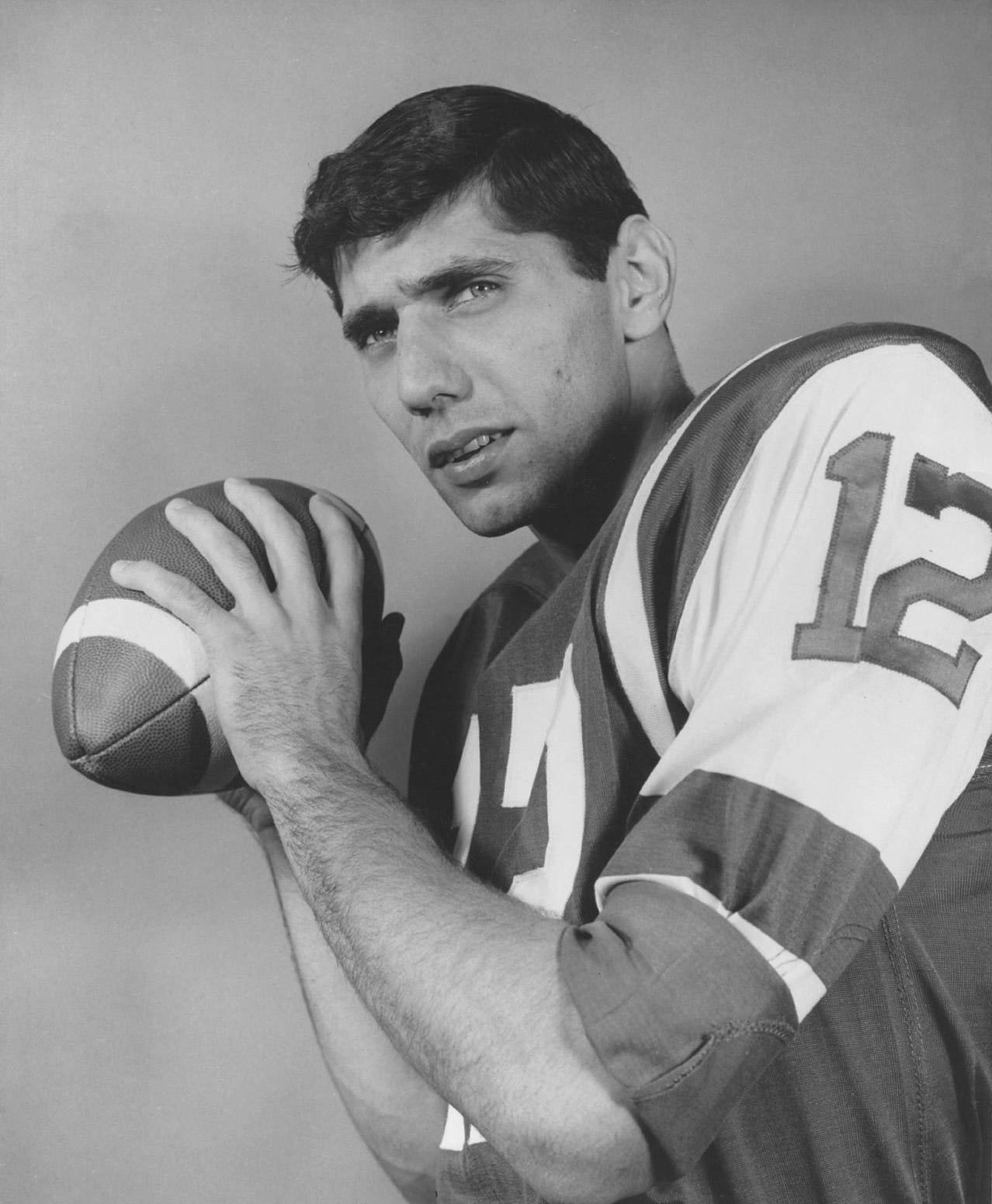
Namath in 1965.

Nursing an injured knee, Namath did not start the 1965 Orange Bowl game, but he came off the bench in the second quarter with Alabama down by two touchdowns, and led his team to within a foot of victory, falling short of the end zone in a run on the game's final play. Despite the loss, he was voted the game's Most Valuable Player. The following day, Namath officially signed with New York for an unprecedented contract worth $427,000 over three years. The total included bonuses yet to be earned as well as a convertible given to Namath as a signing bonus.

The Jets had known about Namath's knee problems, but when team doctor Nicholas examined Namath in the restroom at a party held to celebrate his signing, he told the quarterback that had he known Namath's knees were that bad, he would have advised Werblin not to sign him. The Jets scheduled Namath for surgery amid considerable public interest; the media asked to photograph the operation, but were refused permission. The Jets hedged their bets by signing three other quarterbacks for a total of $400,000, including Notre Dame Heisman Trophy winner John Huarte. Namath's playboy lifestyle, and the intense media spotlight of New York, earned him the nickname "Broadway Joe".

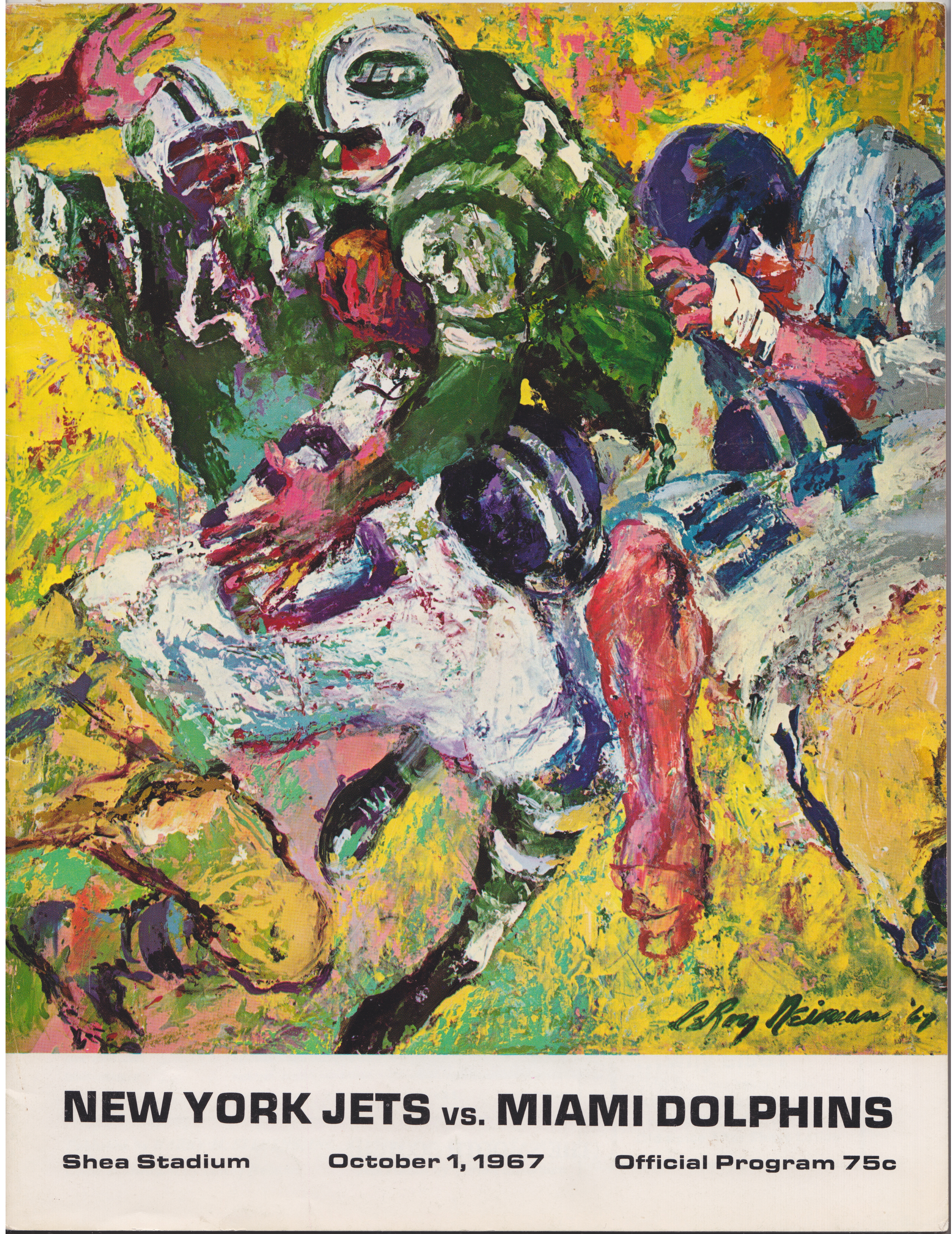
Game program, cover (by LeRoy Neiman) of the game against the Miami Dolphins, October 1, 1967.

Ewbank maintained through training camp that second-year Mike Taliaferro was the number-one quarterback and disappointed a sellout crowd at Houston's Rice Stadium by keeping Namath on the bench at the Jets' season opener. Ewbank felt that Namath might not be ready for several more weeks, but after Werblin's intervention, Namath saw his first regular season action the next week against the Kansas City Chiefs (the former Dallas Texans), and he started the following week against the Buffalo Bills. Namath's performance was inconsistent as he gained pro experience, but he was named AFL Rookie of the Year. The Jets finished the 1965 season 5–8–1 again. But the 1966 season saw the Jets improve to 6-6-2 behind Namath. That season, the NFL and AFL announced their plan to merge in 1970. A championship game (eventually known as the Super Bowl) between the two league champions would follow each season until the merger took place.

In 1967, Namath threw a then-record 4,007 yards as the Jets posted their first winning record, 8–5–1. The Jets had been leading the division with a 7-1-1 record when running back Emerson Boozer was injured and lost for the season on November 6 against the Chiefs. With its running game diminished and opponents able to focus on Namath's passing threat, the Jets lost four of their final five games.

In 1968, Werblin's co-owners gave him an ultimatum: either buy them out or be bought out. He chose the latter option, reportedly profiting $1.4 million for his 1963 investment of $250,000. Before Werblin's departure, the Jets had considered firing Ewbank. They attempted to secure Green Bay Packers coach Vince Lombardi, but Lombardi decided to remain in Green Bay one more season.

The season began with the usual three road games due to the team's status as secondary tenant to the Mets at Shea Stadium. The Jets rose to the top of the AFL East; they had lost only two games by mid-November and built a three-game lead over second-place Houston. New York's next game was at Oakland. In what became known as the Heidi Game, the Jets took a 32–29 lead with 68 seconds left, only to have Oakland score two touchdowns to win the game. However, the touchdowns went unseen by much of the national TV audience, as NBC had switched at 7:00 p.m. to a TV movie of Heidi. Nevertheless, the Jets won their remaining games to finish 11–3. In the playoffs, the Jets defeated the Raiders, 27–23, at Shea Stadium to win the AFL Championship, with Namath throwing three touchdowns, including the game winner to Don Maynard in the fourth quarter.

=== Super Bowl III ===
In the Super Bowl at the Miami Orange Bowl on January 12, 1969, the Jets faced the Baltimore Colts, who had dominated the NFL with a 13–1 record. In their 14 regular season games, the Colts permitted only 144 points. Their sole loss had been to the Cleveland Browns, who they then defeated 34–0 in the 1968 NFL Championship Game. Bookie Jimmy "The Greek" Snyder proclaimed the Colts as 17-point favorites over the Jets. Sports Illustrated's top football writer, Tex Maule, predicted a 43–0 Colts victory. The first two Super Bowls had been dominated by the NFL champion Green Bay Packers; most journalists expected the Colts to easily defeat the Jets.

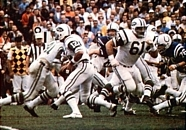
The Jets playing the Colts in Super Bowl III.

From his arrival in Miami, Namath was outspoken about the Jets' chances in the Super Bowl. He alleged that there were five AFL quarterbacks better than Colts quarterback Earl Morrall, who would be only the third-best on the Jets. He was equally outspoken in a verbal confrontation with Colts kicker Lou Michaels in a Miami restaurant. Three days before the game, while accepting an award from the Miami Touchdown Club, Namath made the statement for which he would be remembered: "And we're going to win Sunday, I'll guarantee you."

The game was a defensive struggle. At halftime, the Jets led 7–0 on a Matt Snell touchdown run; New York's defense frustrated Baltimore, and the Colts were scoreless despite repeated opportunities. Jim Turner added two field goals to make the score 13–0, and Colts coach Don Shula inserted Hall of Fame quarterback Johnny Unitas in Morrall's place. Unitas initially failed to move the Colts' offense, and Turner gave the Jets a 16–0 lead with his third field goal. Unitas managed to lead the Colts to a touchdown with less than four minutes left. A second drive (after a successful onside kick) fell short, and the Jets were able to run out the clock for a 16–7 victory, one of the greatest upsets in football history.

Houston Post columnist Jack Gallagher traced the Jets' progress from their early days to the Super Bowl:

I remember when the 1962 Titans drew 36,161—not the average attendance, mind you, but for the season ... I remember when a squirt of a Texan named Hayseed Stephens, instead of Broadway Joe Namath quarterbacked New York's AFL entry ... As the thoughts keep rolling back I find it difficult to reconcile the Jets with the champions of pro football. But I do recall [former AFL Commissioner Joe] Foss once saying, "When sports historians chart the progress of this league they'll find that no organization in sport went so far so fast." Clearly, the franchise that went the farthest the fastest was the New York Jets.

=== Decline and Namath's departure ===
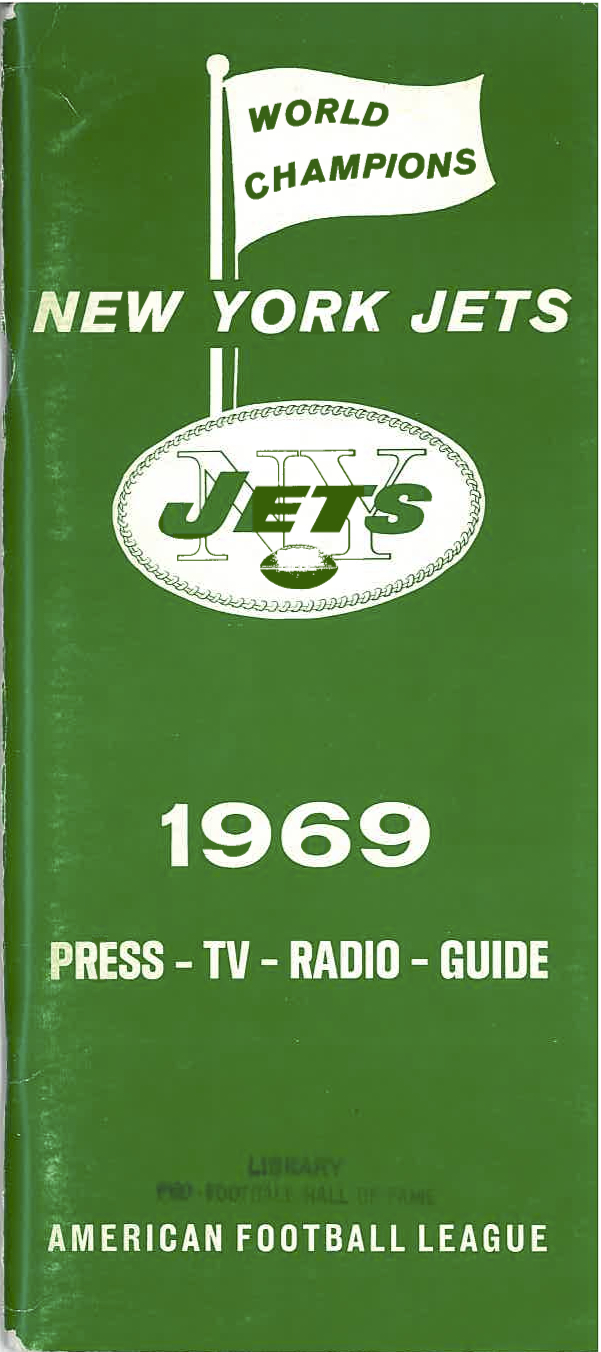
The only Jets media guide to proclaim the team "World Champions"

The Jets faced several off-field issues prior to the 1969 season. When the NFL demanded that Namath sell his Bachelors III bar because it had become a hangout for gangsters, he instead announced his retirement, feeling he had been badly treated. Six weeks later, Namath reconsidered, sold the bar and rejoined the team. Several Super Bowl veterans were cut by the team, or had bitter contract disputes with Ewbank in his capacity as general manager. According to receiver Don Maynard, "When you get rid of veteran ballplayers and replace them with rookies, the level goes down."

The Jets' success in signing Namath and the rise of the team in the standings adversely affected their crosstown rivals, the Giants, who had played in five NFL championship games in six years to 1963, but who thereafter declined in the standings. Giants owner Wellington Mara stated, "I think the Jets coming in when they did contributed to our bad years, because we tried to do everything for the short term rather than the long haul—we'd trade a draft choice for a player, figuring he'd give us one or two good years. We didn't want to accept how the public might react if we had a bad year or two or three." In 1967, the Giants traded for star Minnesota Vikings quarterback Fran Tarkenton in the vain hopes he would lead them to renewed success and rival Namath in the public eye. In August 1969, the Jets faced the Giants in a preseason game at the Yale Bowl. While the Jets' Super Bowl win legitimized the AFL as a comparable league to the NFL in the eyes of many, others doubted the AFL's standard of play, and the Jets were underdogs going into the game. Giants coach Allie Sherman approached the game as if it were a regular season contest, and the Jets sent the three remaining original Titans out for the coin toss. The Jets defeated the Giants 37–14, and Sherman was fired a few weeks later. The Jets' fellow tenants, the Mets, won a championship themselves; the baseball team's accomplishments forced the Jets to play their first five games on the road. The Jets recovered from a slow start to win their second consecutive Eastern Division championship, but fell to Kansas City in the divisional round of the playoffs, 13–6.

The first NFL game for the Jets, as the leagues finalized their merger in 1970, was also the first-ever Monday Night Football game, a 31–21 loss to the Cleveland Browns. Three weeks later, they played the Colts for the first time since the Super Bowl. The Jets lost both the game and Namath, who fractured his wrist and was lost for the season as the Jets fell to a record of 4–10, the worst mark yet of the Namath era. They did not have a winning record again until 1981. After six years with the team, wide receiver George Sauer, a major contributor offensively, retired on April 16, 1971. Namath was injured again in a 1971 preseason game in Tampa, and missed much of the season. He returned on November 28 against the San Francisco 49ers and threw three touchdown passes; the Jets lost by three points. The Jets finished the season at 6–8. In 1972, Namath had one of the best days of his career against the Baltimore Colts: he completed 15 of 28 passes for 496 yards and six touchdowns. Despite Namath's performance, John Madden's Oakland Raiders eliminated the Jets from contention in their second-to-last regular season game. New York finished the season with a record of 7–7.

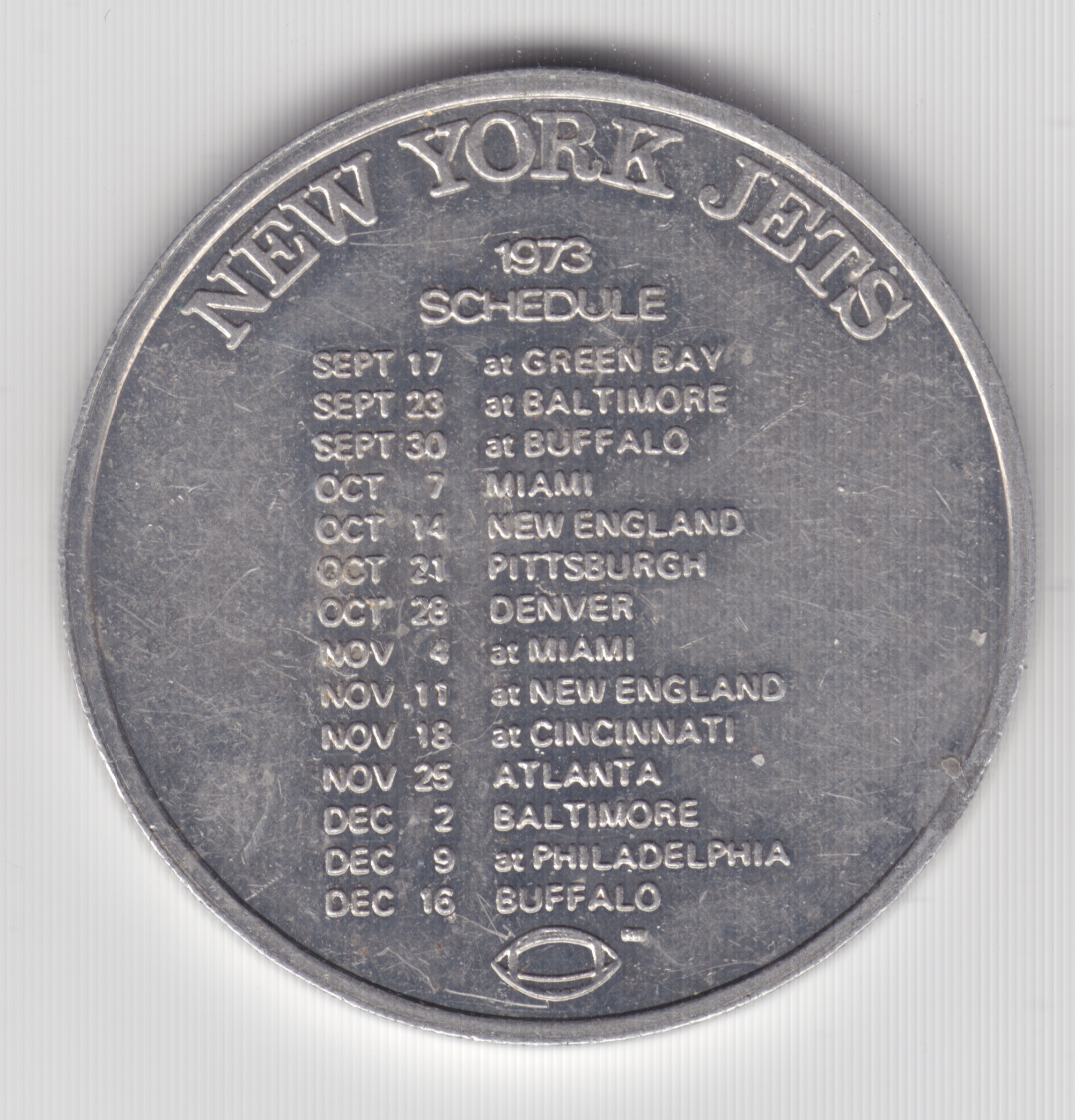
Commemorative medal with the Jets' 1973 schedule. Because of the Mets' successful season, two home games were moved later in the season, and the scheduled home game against the Steelers had to be played in Pittsburgh.

Before the 1973 season, the aging Ewbank announced that he would retire as coach after the season and as general manager after 1974. The Mets unexpectedly qualified for the World Series, consigning the Jets to another long stay away from Shea. The Jets did not play a home game until the end of October. The team finished with a record of 4–10, though their final game against the Bills attracted considerable media attention. The attention was not for Ewbank's last game, but for Bills running back O. J. Simpson's attempt to become the first NFL player to rush for 2,000 yards in a season. Simpson gained 200 yards, finishing with 2,003 for the season. Shortly after the 1973 season, the team hired Ewbank's son-in-law, former Cardinals coach Charley Winner, as head coach. The new coach showed an initial inability to get his team to emulate his last name: the team started the season by losing seven of their first eight games. Namath, who had a reasonably healthy season behind a poor offensive line, predicted the Jets would win their final six games. The first NFL regular-season overtime victory, over the Giants at the Yale Bowl, and the usual large number of home games towards the end of the season helped New York in its comeback, and a Namath prediction again came true.

Al Ward replaced Ewbank as general manager in 1975. The Jets won four of their five preseason games, though sportswriter Gerald Eskenazi, in his history of the Jets, notes that the wins were secured by playing first-string players while the other teams were trying out rookies and backups. When the regular season started, the Jets lost seven of their first nine games, and Winner was fired. Offensive coordinator Ken Shipp became interim head coach, and the Jets finished with a record of 3–11. Running back John Riggins, who became the first 1,000-yard rusher in franchise history during the season and made the Pro Bowl, departed for the Washington Redskins as he felt the Jets' Namath-led offense passed the ball too often. New York hired North Carolina State coach Lou Holtz. With New York enduring the second of three consecutive 3–11 seasons (two wins came over the 2–12 Bills and a third over the 0–14 expansion Tampa Bay Buccaneers), Holtz—who went on to great success at Notre Dame—resigned with one game left in the season to become head coach at the University of Arkansas.

Following their disastrous 1976 season, the Jets hired longtime assistant Walt Michaels as their new head coach. In the offseason, the team made the difficult decision to part ways with Joe Namath, who had become ineffective on the field. Although Namath's throwing abilities were unimpaired, his knees were so bad as to render him almost immobile; Paul Zimmerman of the New York Post dubbed him the "million dollar statue". The team attempted to trade him but was unsuccessful. On May 12, 1977, Namath was cut from the roster. He signed with the Los Angeles Rams, but retired at season's end.

== Rebuilding and modest success (1977–1989) ==
=== Final years at Shea ===
Feeling that having to play road games until the Mets were done with Shea Stadium put the Jets at a disadvantage, the team announced in 1977 that they would play two home games a year in September at the Giants' new home at the Meadowlands Sports Complex in New Jersey, Giants Stadium. Litigation began between New York City and the Jets over the issue, and in the lawsuit's settlement, the city agreed to allow the Jets to play two September home games a season at Shea beginning in 1978 for the remaining six years in the Jets' lease. In 1977, the Jets were to play one September game at Giants Stadium and an October 2 game at Shea. Despite the favorable settlement, the Jets won only three of fourteen games. Rookies on the team, selected in the 1977 NFL draft, included seven players who started for them in the late 1970s and early 1980s, such as tackle Marvin Powell, wide receiver Wesley Walker, and defensive lineman Joe Klecko. Klecko became part of a defensive line known as the New York Sack Exchange.

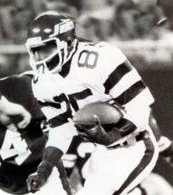
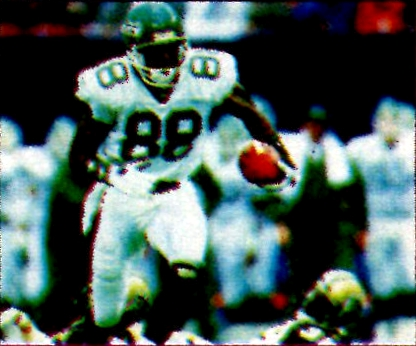
Wesley Walker (left) and Al Toon (right) were the Jets' primary wide receivers in the 1980s and rank among the best to play the position in franchise history.

In Michaels' second season, the Jets adopted new uniforms in a darker green and with a streamlined logo. When quarterback Richard Todd was injured, his backup Matt Robinson proved to be a deep-throwing threat who led New York to eight wins in the first fourteen of the newly expanded sixteen-game season, and into playoff contention. However, the team lost its final two contests and did not qualify for the playoffs. Michaels was named AFC Coach of the Year for keeping his young team in playoff contention so long. There was much media discussion as to whether Todd or Robinson should be the starting quarterback in 1979. Todd emerged as the starter, as Robinson was injured while arm wrestling during the preseason. The injury — and his attempts to conceal it from Michaels — ended his career with the Jets. Todd led the Jets to another 8–8 record. Jimmy the Greek predicted the Jets would go to the Super Bowl in 1980, but they ended that season with a 4–12 record.

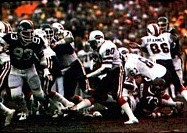
The Jets playing the Bills in the 1981 AFC wild card game.

There was fan pressure on the Jets to fire Michaels after 1980; it increased when the Jets lost their first three games of the 1981 season. Even so, Michaels described his team as being of "a championship, playoff caliber". The Jets compiled a record of 10–2–1 in their remaining games—losing twice to the Seattle Seahawks—to finish the season with their first winning record and playoff appearance since 1969. Their Week 16 victory over the Packers boosted the Jets into the playoffs and also gave the Giants their first playoff berth since 1963 with a victory over the Dallas Cowboys the previous day. The Jets fell behind the Bills 24–0 in the wild card game and lost 31–27, as their potential game-winning drive was stopped when the Bills intercepted a Todd pass near Buffalo's goal line. One of the Jets' bright spots was their defensive line. Mark Gastineau and Klecko anchored the Sack Exchange and combined for more than 40 quarterback sacks.

In the strike-shortened 1982 season, the Jets finished 6–3 and upset the Cincinnati Bengals in the first round of the playoffs, as running back Freeman McNeil became the second player to rush for 200 yards in a postseason game. New York then defeated the top seeded Los Angeles Raiders 17–14, based on the strong performances of McNeil and Wesley Walker in a game that saw numerous turnovers on both sides. The Jets next traveled to face the Miami Dolphins in the AFC Championship Game. The game was preceded by a series of storms that turned the Orange Bowl into a mud pit. The Dolphins stated that they did not own a tarpaulin, and that stadium maintenance was Dade County's responsibility, so the field lay exposed to the elements. The muddy field slowed the Jets' offense. In what was dubbed the "Mud Bowl", neither team managed much offense (both teams gained less than 200 yards). At the end of his best season, Todd threw five interceptions, the last being a screen pass deflected and returned by linebacker A. J. Duhe for a costly 4th-quarter touchdown as New York fell to Miami 14–0. On February 9, 1983, Michaels announced his resignation, and the following day the Jets elevated offensive coordinator Joe Walton to the head coaching position.

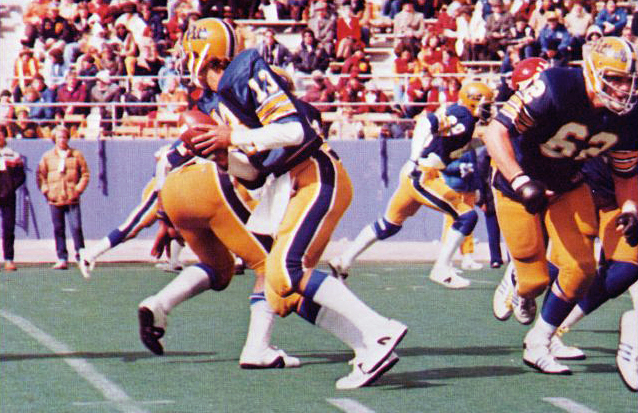
Pitt quarterback Dan Marino (#13, with ball). New York passed him up in the 1983 Draft, and he would be a Jets nemesis for fifteen years.

In Walton's first months as head coach, the team made a decision which would long be discussed and criticized. In the first round of the 1983 NFL draft, New York selected quarterback Ken O'Brien. In drafting O'Brien, the Jets passed up University of Pittsburgh quarterback Dan Marino, who went on to have a stellar career with the Dolphins, and would many times be a thorn in the Jets' side. The 1983 season started with high expectations, but the Jets dropped to 7–9. The Jets' lease at Shea Stadium was due to expire after 1983; Jets majority owner Leon Hess and New York Mayor Ed Koch attempted to negotiate a new lease for the team. The Jets wanted the city to redevelop the stadium to expand its capacity to 67,000 and to alleviate its rundown state. Hess felt that Koch was uninterested in the Jets (he had attended one Jets game in his six years as mayor, and had left early). Koch said Hess refused to consider the city's offer of renovations to Shea Stadium and had made it clear to city officials he planned to move to New Jersey. Negotiations soon reached an impasse, and in October 1983, the team announced it would move to Giants Stadium beginning in the 1984 season. The Jets played their final game at Shea on December 10, 1983, and lost to the Steelers 34–7 (it was also the last game for Steeler Hall of Fame quarterback Terry Bradshaw). As fans pillaged the stadium for mementos, the scoreboard read "N.J. Jets" in reference to the team's departure to the Meadowlands.

=== Early Meadowlands years ===
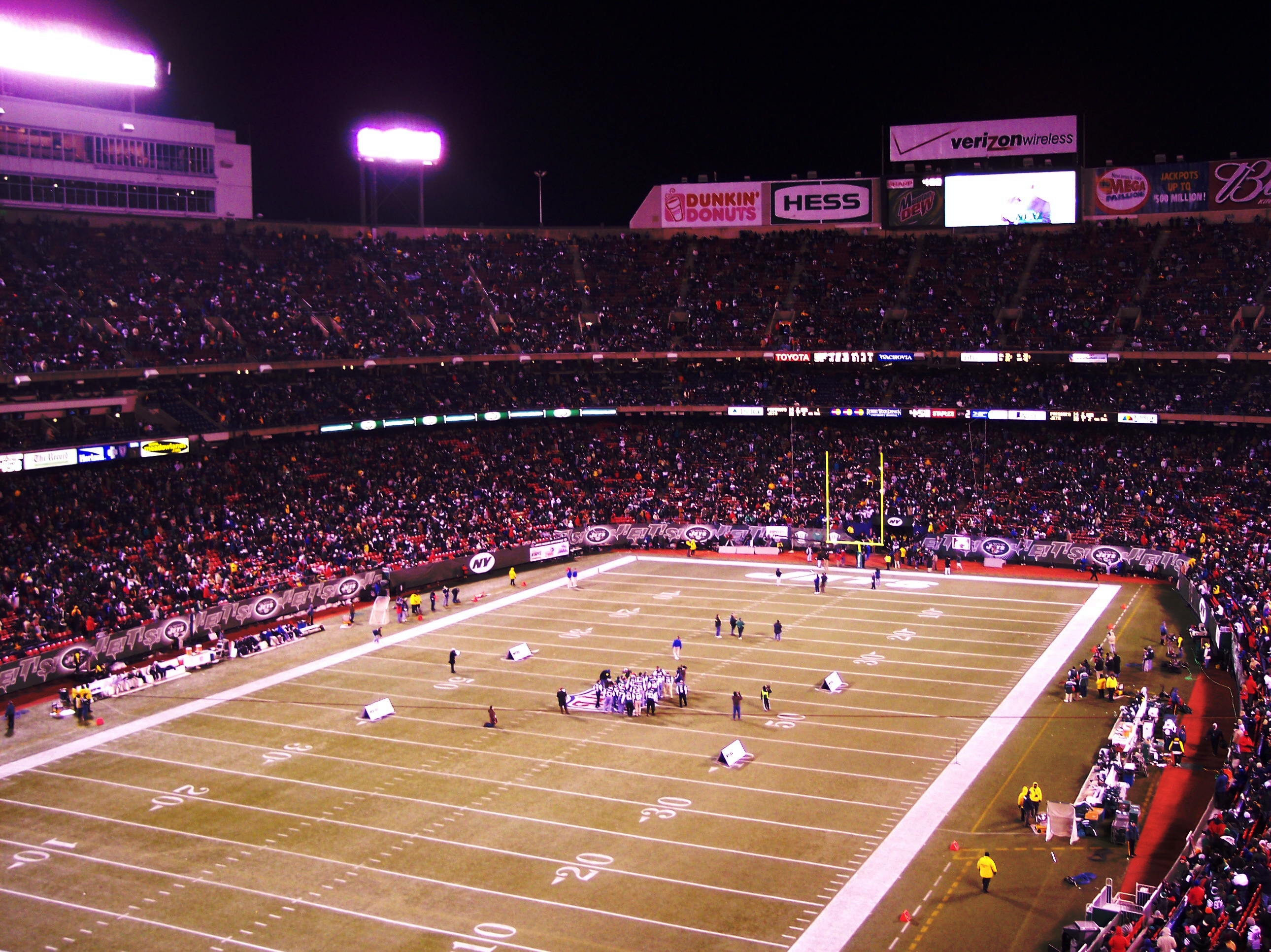
A Jets night game at Giants Stadium, their home from 1984 until 2010

Hess acquired full ownership of the Jets on February 9, 1984, when Helen Dillion sold her 25% interest to him. Before the season, New York traded quarterback Richard Todd to the New Orleans Saints. New York began its season with veteran Pat Ryan as starting quarterback; O'Brien was spending most weekdays waiting to testify about an altercation at the Studio 54 nightclub, at which Jets players had been present and, by some accounts, involved. The Jets played their first game in the 1984 preseason at their new home against the Cincinnati Bengals on August 5, then on September 6 played their first regular season game with Giants Stadium as home base against the Steelers, the same team that the Jets faced at their last game at Shea, losing 23–17. They had a second consecutive mediocre season, finishing 7–9 after starting the season 6–2.

In 1985, the Jets made the playoffs, accruing an 11–5 record, and hosted their first playoff game in four years. They were defeated in the first round by the eventual AFC champion New England Patriots after turning the ball over four times. Looking to improve on their 1985 performance, the Jets started the 1986 season 10–1, including nine straight wins. In week three against Miami, the Jets won 51–45 in overtime as Ken O'Brien and Dan Marino combined to pass for 884 yards, then an NFL record. Wracked by injuries, the Jets lost their final five regular season games, but still made the playoffs. In the wild card playoff game against the Kansas City Chiefs, the Jets replaced O'Brien with Pat Ryan, and won 35–15. This victory sent the Jets to the divisional round in an away game against the Cleveland Browns. The Jets built a 20–10 lead and appeared to have stopped a late Cleveland drive — until Mark Gastineau was called for a roughing the passer penalty, a late hit on Browns quarterback Bernie Kosar that gave the Browns another opportunity. Cleveland went on to tie the game, and in the second overtime, defeated the Jets, 23–20. The Browns went on to lose to the Denver Broncos (beaten by the Jets earlier in the season) in the AFC Championship Game; the Broncos in turn lost to the Giants in Super Bowl XXI. Many Jets were convinced that given the opportunity to play the Giants, the Jets would have won. According to Eskenazi, the Giants "were the toast of New York, back in a championship game for the first time since the 1960s, while the Jets contemplated the late hit and what might have been".

In 1987, the Jets won their first two games. NFL players then staged a strike; a team composed mostly of replacement players lost two of the next three games. The locker room was divided after the strike due to the decision of a few players, led by Gastineau, to cross the picket line. The Jets remained in contention in a mediocre AFC East through much of the season, but dropped all four games in December to finish 6–9, in last place. In 1988, the Sack Exchange era ended as Joe Klecko failed his offseason physical and was waived, linebacker Lance Mehl announced his retirement during training camp, and Mark Gastineau retired midseason, citing personal reasons. In spite of these departures, the Jets finished with an 8–7–1 record. They secured a winning record by ending the season with a victory over the Giants, which cost their in-state rivals a playoff berth. The team performed badly in 1989, finishing 4–12. On December 18, 1989, the Jets hired executive Dick Steinberg from the New England Patriots to take over as general manager. Three days after New York's final game of the season, a 37–0 loss to the Bills at Giants Stadium, Steinberg fired Walton and began to search for the team's 10th coach. The disastrous 1989 campaign cost Walton the chance to be the first Jets coach to complete his career with a winning record, a statistic he later admitted he cared about deeply.

== Search for success (1990–1996): Coslet, Carroll and Kotite eras ==
Dick Steinberg initially sought to hire Michigan State coach George Perles as Jets head coach, but the university refused to release him from his contract. Steinberg then hired Cincinnati Bengals offensive coordinator Bruce Coslet. Coslet's offensive schemes, described as "state-of-the-art" by Sports Illustrated, had helped the Bengals to Super Bowl XXIII, following the 1988 season. The Jets' poor record in 1989 had given them the second pick in the draft; the team selected star Penn State running back Blair Thomas, who was expected to have a strong career with the Jets. Instead Thomas played on the team for four injury-plagued, unproductive years and was cut before the 1994 season began.

Coslet's first season proved only slightly better than Joe Walton's last; the Jets finished 6–10. In the 1991 NFL draft, the Jets lost another opportunity to draft a star quarterback, as a draft-day deal that would have allowed them to select Brett Favre fell through. The Jets had more success in the 1991 season: they built a 7–8 record with one game remaining, and needed a win against Miami to clinch a playoff berth. New York kicker Raul Allegre (recently signed to replace aging kicker Pat Leahy, who had been kicking for the Jets since the days of Joe Namath) made one field goal to force overtime, and another to win in the extra period. The victory gave the Jets their first playoff berth since 1986. In the wild card game, a Ken O'Brien pass into the end zone in the final seconds of the game was intercepted, and the Jets lost to Houston, 17–10.

After a strong performance by rookie quarterback Browning Nagle in the team's 5–0 1992 preseason, Coslet promoted him to the starting lineup. Despite throwing for a total of 366 yards against the Atlanta Falcons in the opener, then the second-highest yardage total for a quarterback making his NFL debut, the team lost 20–17; the Jets lost their first four games. Wide receiver Al Toon retired on November 27, 1992, having suffered the ninth concussion of his career earlier in the season. Two days later, defensive end Dennis Byrd collided with teammate Scott Mersereau when Chiefs quarterback Dave Krieg stepped forward in the pocket as the two players were about to sandwich him. Mersereau managed to walk away and continue his career with New York, but Byrd suffered a fracture to his C-5 vertebra that left him partially paralyzed. Inspired by Byrd's persistent high spirits, New York traveled to Buffalo the following week and defeated the AFC champion Bills. The Jets finished the season 4–12.

Before the 1993 season, the Jets obtained Bengals quarterback Boomer Esiason, who had worked with Coslet in Cincinnati. Steinberg signed veteran safety Ronnie Lott to shore up the defense. O'Brien's career with the Jets ended with an offseason trade to the Green Bay Packers, and running back Freeman McNeil retired after twelve seasons. The Jets suffered another December collapse: they lost four of their last five to finish 8–8. The Jets would have made the playoffs by winning their last game, but were shut out at the Astrodome by the Oilers. Following the season, Steinberg fired Coslet and replaced him with defensive coordinator Pete Carroll.

Carroll's first season, 1994, started well. Going into a November home game against Miami, the Jets were 6–5; a victory over the Dolphins would tie them for the AFC East lead. The Jets built leads of 17–0 and 24–6, but Dan Marino and the Dolphins cut the lead to 24–21 and got the ball for a final-minute drive. Marino completed a pass into Jets territory with just over 30 seconds remaining. With the clock running, the Dolphins acted like Marino would spike the ball to stop the clock. However, Marino faked the spike and tossed the ball to Mark Ingram in the end zone for the winning touchdown. The loss started yet another December collapse; the Jets would not win again for the rest of the season. Before the season finale, the Jets announced that Steinberg was ill with stomach cancer; he died the following September. The team fired Carroll after the season and replaced him with former Philadelphia Eagles coach Rich Kotite. Hess also named Kotite as general manager as well.

Controversy began before the 1995 season when the Jets drafted Kyle Brady over Warren Sapp. At the press conference announcing Kotite's hiring, Hess told the media, "I'm 80 years old, I want results now." However, the first game of the Kotite era proved to be a harbinger – a 52–14 loss to the Dolphins. A month later, they lost to the Oakland Raiders 47–10 in the Jets' sole national television appearance of the season. The Jets defeated the Seattle Seahawks on the Sunday following Thanksgiving after an inspirational speech by Hess, but again had trouble in December, losing all four games in the month to finish 3–13. In 1996, the Jets brought in veteran quarterback Neil O'Donnell, who had just led Pittsburgh to Super Bowl XXX, to lead the offense. The Jets, for the first time since the leagues merged, were in possession of the first pick overall in the NFL Draft, which they used to select wide receiver Keyshawn Johnson. O'Donnell proved injury-prone, and the Jets suffered the worst season in franchise history. They lost their first eight games, beat the Arizona Cardinals in Tempe, then proceeded to lose their remaining seven games. Two days before the season finale, on December 20, 1996, Kotite announced his resignation effective at season's end. After the last game, a 31–28 home loss to the Dolphins, Kotite was hit with a full cup of beer as he left the field; another fan (fewer than 22,000 attended the game; almost 56,000 ticketholders stayed home) held up a sign, "The End of an Error".

== Return to respectability (1997–2014) ==
=== Bill Parcells era ===
Hess and team president Gutman agreed on a top candidate as new coach — Patriots coach Bill Parcells, who had won two Super Bowls with the Giants and was in the process of taking the Patriots there as well. Parcells believed that he could void his contract and seek a position elsewhere; New England owner Robert Kraft believed the Patriots would be entitled to compensation. NFL commissioner Paul Tagliabue ruled in the Patriots' favor, and New England demanded the Jets give them the first pick overall in the upcoming draft. The Jets responded by hiring Parcells disciple Bill Belichick as head coach; Parcells was to serve as a "consultant" in 1997 and head coach beginning in 1998. The Patriots were unimpressed by what they saw as a subterfuge, and Tagliabue mediated the matter. He set Parcells free from the Patriots; the Jets gave the Patriots four draft picks, including their first round pick in 1999. The Jets put an end to Belichick's six-day reign (he remained as assistant head coach and as defensive coordinator) and hired Parcells as head coach.

The Parcells era started with a 41–3 victory over Seattle. The Jets were 9–6 in their first fifteen games and went into the season finale against the Detroit Lions needing a win to make the playoffs. Parcells, who never had full confidence in O'Donnell, benched him in favor of Ray Lucas after O'Donnell threw an early interception. Lucas was ineffective as well, as the Jets lost 13–10. The eight-game improvement in the standings, together with Parcells' reputation as a winner, caused high expectations for 1998. The team announced that it would adopt a modified version of the Jets' 1963–1977 logo and uniforms beginning in the 1998 season.

Parcells signed Patriots running back Curtis Martin as a restricted free agent, giving up 1st- and 3rd-round picks. Parcells also signed Baltimore Ravens quarterback Vinny Testaverde as a free agent, which paved the way for O'Donnell's release from the team. After an 0–2 start, New York won six of the next seven games. The Jets lost only once the rest of the way, and clinched their first NFL division crown against the Bills on December 19, 1998. They set a franchise record for the number of victories in a season with a win over the Patriots in the season finale. The team finished 12–4 and were second seed in the playoffs with a first round bye. The Jets faced the Jacksonville Jaguars in their divisional playoff game, their first home playoff game since the 1986 season. New York defeated the Jaguars 34–24 and met the top-seeded Broncos in the AFC Championship Game. Though the Jets possessed a 10–0 lead in the 3rd quarter, the Broncos, led by John Elway in his final home game, came back and defeated the Jets, 23–10.

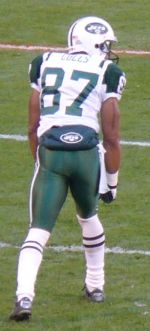
Laveranues Coles, Jets wide receiver. Drafted by Parcells in 2000, he had three stints with the Jets.

The Jets had high hopes for 1999, but suffered a blow in the season opener when Testaverde ruptured his Achilles tendon and was lost for the season. New York suffered other injuries and fell to a 2–6 record before recovering to finish 8–8. Two days after the end of the season, Parcells announced his resignation as coach; he remained with the team for a year as chief of football operations. Belichick was slated to become head coach in Parcells' place, but one day later, he announced his own resignation. Robert Kraft had gotten word to Belichick through intermediaries that he could have complete control of football operations and a $2 million salary if he got out of his contract with the Jets. After a lawsuit to void Belichick's contract failed and Tagliabue refused to release him, the Jets and Patriots agreed on draft choice compensation for the Jets.

As a result of Leon Hess' death in May 1999, the team was put up for auction in January 2000. In a bidding war between Charles F. Dolan and Woody Johnson, Johnson emerged victorious, and he purchased the team for $635 million. Johnson expressed interest in having Parcells return to his coaching role; the team elevated linebackers coach Al Groh to the head coaching position when Parcells refused.

In April 2000, New York traded wide receiver Keyshawn Johnson, a major offensive threat on the 1998 team, to the Tampa Bay Buccaneers for two 1st-round draft picks. Johnson wanted a renegotiated contract and was threatening to hold out. Having acquired New England's pick in the Belichick compensation, and with their own pick, the Jets had four 1st-round picks. They selected quarterback Chad Pennington as well as defensive linemen John Abraham and Shaun Ellis, and tight end Anthony Becht, all of whom would be key players on the Jets playoff teams of the 2000s. For the first time, the Jets won their first four games, including a victory over Johnson and the Buccaneers. They reached 6–1 following the "Monday Night Miracle", the largest comeback in the history of Monday Night Football: the Jets overcame a 30–7 4th-quarter deficit to defeat the Dolphins, 40–37 in overtime. The Jets went 3–6 after that, finishing at 9–7, out of the playoffs.

After spending less than a year with the team, Groh resigned to accept a coaching job at his alma mater, the University of Virginia. Parcells resigned from his front-office position and was replaced with Chiefs executive Terry Bradway on Parcells' recommendation.

=== Herman Edwards takes over ===
On January 18, 2001, the Jets announced Herman Edwards as the new coach. Edwards, a former defensive back who had worked his way up through the NFL coaching system, had never served as head coach at any level. He was the first African-American Jets head coach. Edwards lost his first game, two days before the September 11 attacks. In the wake of 9/11, the NFL had to decide whether to play its games the following weekend. Testaverde and the Jets spoke out against playing on the weekend after 9/11, and the Jets were prepared to forfeit the game rather than fly. The NFL decided to move that week's games to the end of the regular season. The Jets needed to win that game, in Oakland against the Raiders, to reach the playoffs, and John Hall kicked a last-minute 53-yard field goal for a 24–22 victory and a playoff berth. Edwards was the first coach to lead the Jets to the playoffs in his first year with the team. In the playoffs, the Jets again played at Oakland. New York could not stop the Raiders' passing game, and Oakland won, 38–24.

The Jets began the 2002 season 1–4, but then put together a six-game winning streak. On the final day of the season, the Jets beat the Packers following a New England victory over Miami. This gave the Jets a 9–7 record, their second post-merger division title, and a playoff berth. Chad Pennington had an outstanding day against the Packers and finished the season the top-rated passer in the league. The Jets began the playoffs against the Indianapolis Colts at home, and defeated them 41–0. The Jets then played the Raiders, who again defeated them in Oakland, 30–10. The Jets lost a number of key players to free agency in the offseason. Four signed with the Washington Redskins, including kicker Hall, wide receiver Laveranues Coles, kick returner Chad Morton, and offensive lineman Randy Thomas. During a preseason game against the Giants, Pennington sustained a serious wrist injury, and required surgery. The aging Testaverde stepped in as starter, but led the Jets to only a 2–6 record, including losses to the Redskins and the Dallas Cowboys. The Jets split their remaining games and finished 6–10.

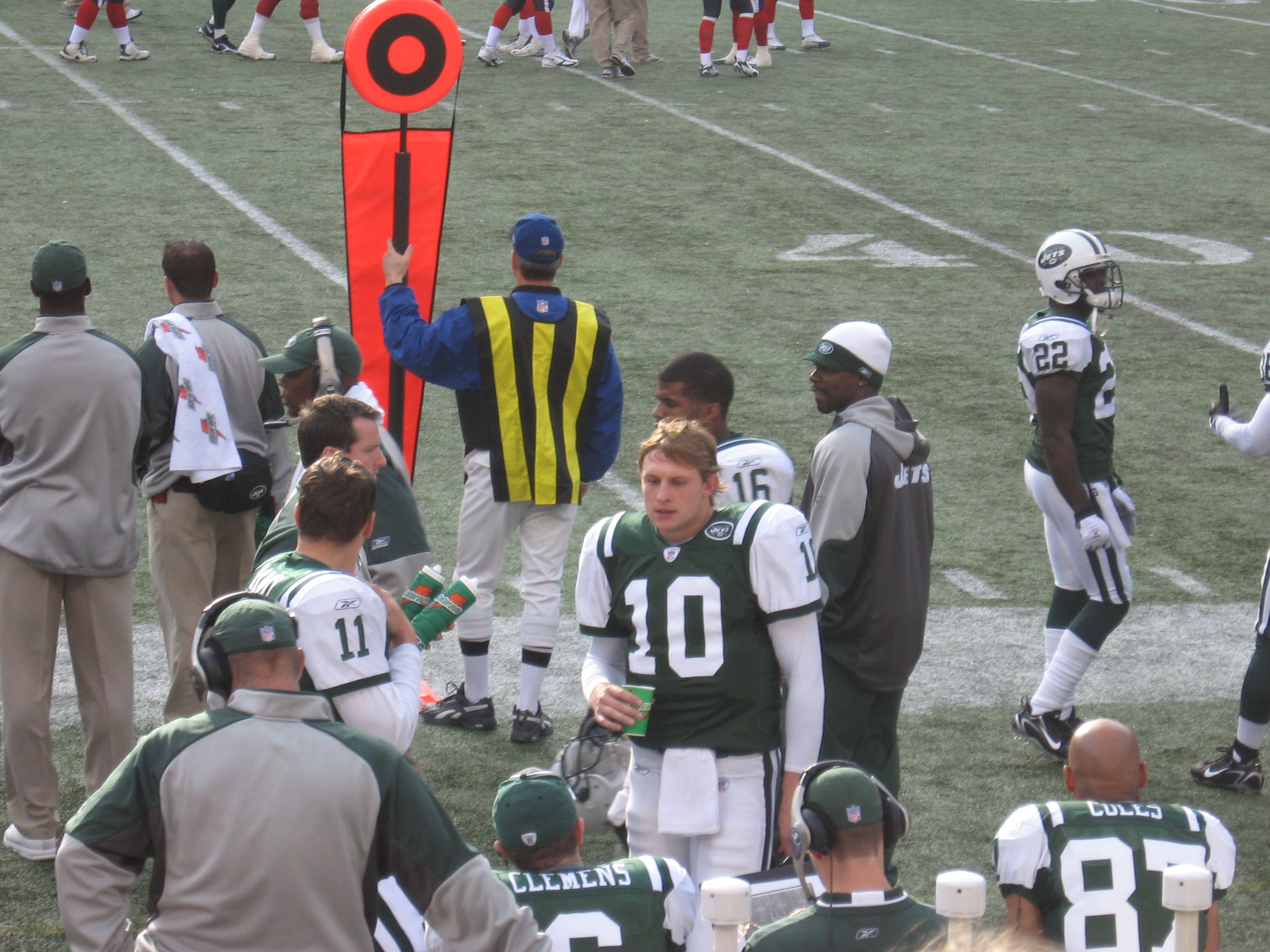
Chad Pennington talks with teammates during a 2006 game against the Houston Texans.

In spite of the team's poor 2003 record, Johnson retained Edwards as head coach and extended his contract through 2007. With a healthy Pennington at quarterback, the Jets began their season at 5–0 for the first time and then lost two of their next three games. During the team's second meeting with the Bills, Pennington suffered a tear in his rotator cuff that caused him to miss three starts. Pennington returned in a 29–7 rout of the Houston Texans. The team struggled toward the end of the regular season, winning only one of its final four games. Despite a final-game loss to the St. Louis Rams, the Jets reached the playoffs. The team traveled to San Diego to play the Chargers in the wild card round and upset them 23–20 on a Doug Brien field goal in overtime. The win sent the Jets to the divisional round against the 15–1 Pittsburgh Steelers. The Jets again took their opponent to overtime, as Brien missed a field goal with two minutes remaining and the score tied. He missed a second field goal in overtime. Pittsburgh kicker Jeff Reed proved more accurate, and the Steelers beat the Jets, 20–17.

In Week 3 of the 2005 season, both Pennington and backup quarterback Jay Fiedler were injured against the Jaguars. With both quarterbacks out for the season, third-string quarterback Brooks Bollinger started; the 41-year-old Testaverde was brought out of retirement to serve as his backup. Bollinger played badly in a loss in week four, and Testaverde became the starter. Testaverde had little success, and Bollinger did not fare better when he was re-inserted. Running back Curtis Martin chose to have arthroscopic surgery on his knee with four games left in the season. The Jets finished 4–12.

=== Eric Mangini: initial success, eventual firing ===
On January 6, 2006, Herman Edwards announced his resignation as head coach to take the same position with Kansas City. The Jets received a 4th-round draft pick as compensation for Edwards, who was still under contract with the team. On January 17, New York announced the hiring of former Patriots defensive coordinator Eric Mangini. Three weeks later, General Manager Terry Bradway stepped down in favor of his assistant, Mike Tannenbaum. Although Pennington took back his starting position, the Jets only managed to split their first eight games. They began the second half with a victory over New England in Foxboro, and lost only two games the rest of the way to finish 10–6 and secure a playoff berth. In the wild card round, the Jets visited Foxboro again, but this time fell to the Patriots, 37–16. For his success in leading the Jets to the playoffs, Mangini received the nickname "Mangenius" and had a cameo appearance on The Sopranos.

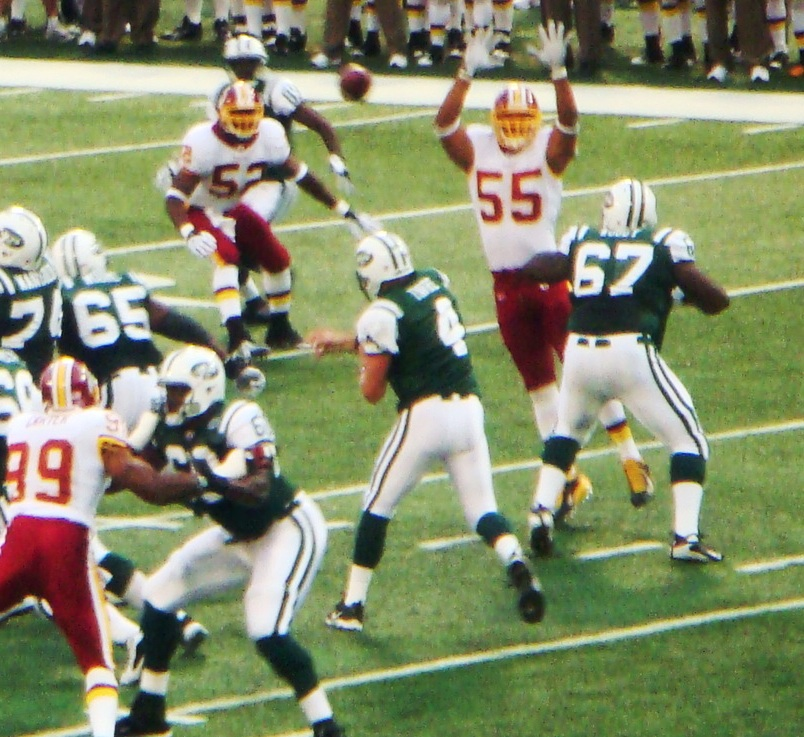
Brett Favre in a 2008 preseason game against the Washington Redskins

After Mangini's successful rookie season, New York had high hopes of further improvement. Following the team's opening loss against New England, the Jets accused the Patriots of videotaping their signals. NFL Commissioner Roger Goodell fined the Patriots and Bill Belichick, and stripped New England of its 1st-round pick in the 2008 NFL draft. Struggling to a 1–7 start, the Jets benched Pennington in favor of backup Kellen Clemens. The Jets won only three games the rest of the way and finished with a record of 4–12. The Jets were again overshadowed by the Giants, who won their third Super Bowl by defeating the previously unbeaten Patriots.

Following the 2007 season, Green Bay Packers quarterback Brett Favre had retired. He wished to return several months later, but found that the Packers had given Aaron Rodgers the starting spot. The subsequent trade talks and rumors were a major story leading up to the 2008 season, and the Jets unexpectedly won the bidding war to trade for Favre. With Favre's acquisition, the Jets released Pennington, who signed with the Dolphins. Despite a good start to the season, the Jets began to falter in December after Favre tore his rotator cuff — he threw five interceptions in a three-game span. The season came down to a final game against the Dolphins, led by Pennington, at Giants Stadium. The Dolphins won to take the division title and eliminate the 9–7 Jets from playoff contention. On December 29, 2008, Mangini was fired after three seasons as head coach, with an overall record of 23–25. Favre again briefly retired from football on February 11, 2009.

=== Rex Ryan era ===
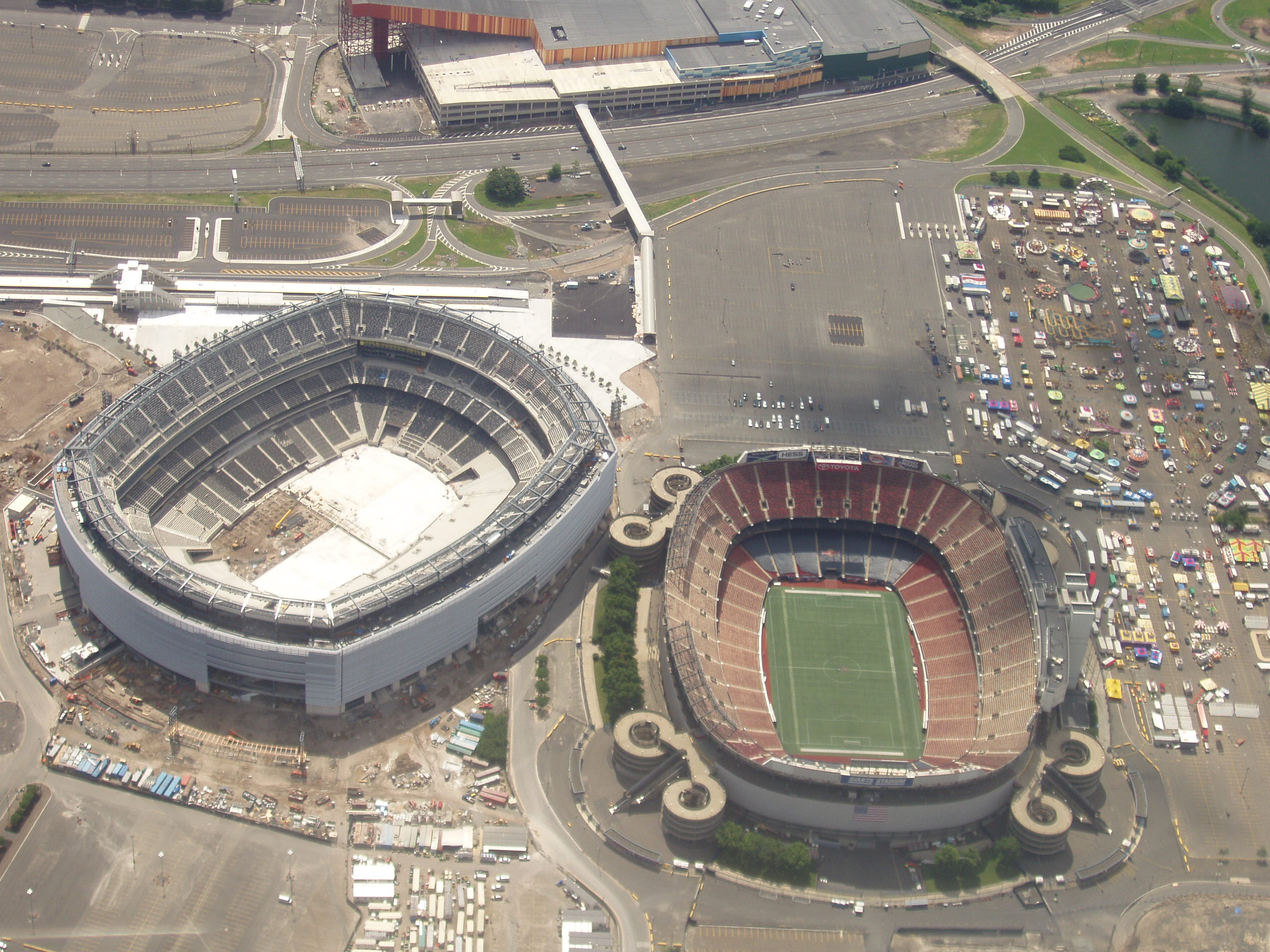
MetLife Stadium under construction (on left) alongside Giants Stadium, July 2009

Following Mangini's departure, New York hoped to lure former Pittsburgh Steelers head coach Bill Cowher out of retirement, suggesting that Cowher might be given control of football operations in addition to serving as coach. However, Cowher decided to remain retired for the season. On January 20, 2009, the Jets offered the position to Baltimore Ravens defensive coordinator Rex Ryan, who accepted. Tannenbaum engineered a draft-day trade with Cleveland, which enabled New York to move up and select highly regarded USC quarterback Mark Sanchez.

New York won its first three games of 2009, including their first home victory over the Patriots since 2000, but lost six of its next seven games. The Jets recovered to 7–6, but then lost to the Atlanta Falcons on December 20, a defeat that caused Ryan to state that the Jets "were obviously out of the playoffs". The next week, the Jets played the 14–0 Indianapolis Colts. The Colts removed many of their starting players from the game early in the second half with a 15–10 lead; the Jets came back for the victory. The victory put the Jets' fate in their own hands, and they defeated the Bengals (who had also clinched a playoff spot and played few starters) in the last game ever at Giants Stadium to secure a playoff berth.

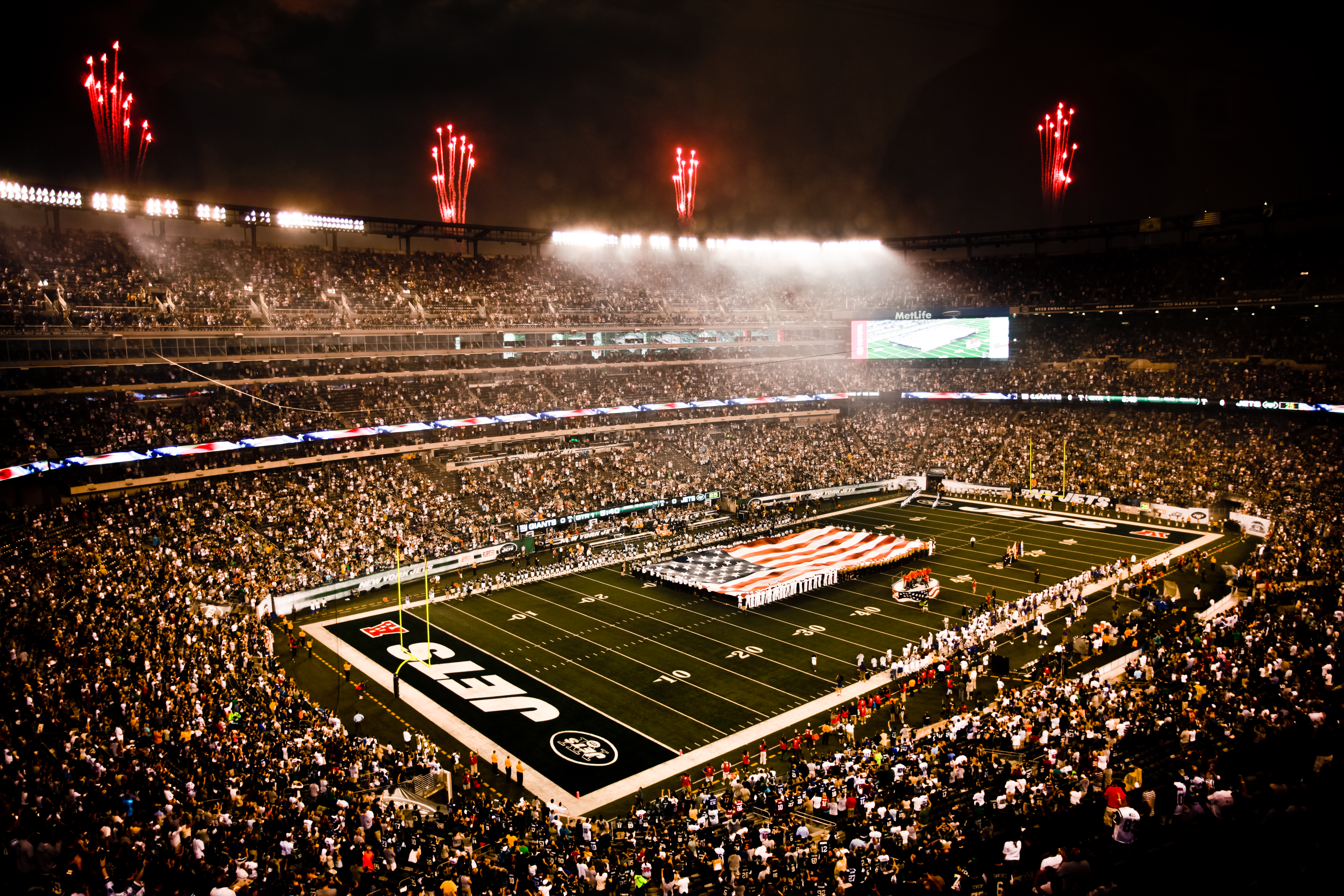
MetLife Stadium, home of the Jets, 2010–present

The following week, the team played the Bengals in the playoffs, this time at Paul Brown Stadium, and secured a 24–14 victory over Cincinnati. That victory meant that the Jets would travel to San Diego to play the Chargers, who had won eleven straight games, in the divisional round. Strong performances by Sanchez, running back Shonn Greene, and the Jets defense helped the Jets to a 17–14 win over the Chargers. New York played the top-seeded Colts in the AFC Championship Game and secured an early 17–6 lead. They had little luck in the second half as the Colts went to the Super Bowl with a 30–17 victory.

The Jets had hoped to move into what was termed the West Side Stadium, to be built in Manhattan, after their 25-year lease at Giants Stadium expired. In 2005, it became clear that New York authorities would not permit the stadium to be built. After the West Side failure, the Jets and Giants entered into a joint venture to build a new $1.6 billion facility alongside Giants Stadium, which was torn down after the new venue was completed. The Jets' new home, MetLife Stadium, opened to the public in April 2010. The stadium took 34 months to construct, and can seat 82,500. The Jets hosted the Giants in the first game of the preseason on August 16, 2010.

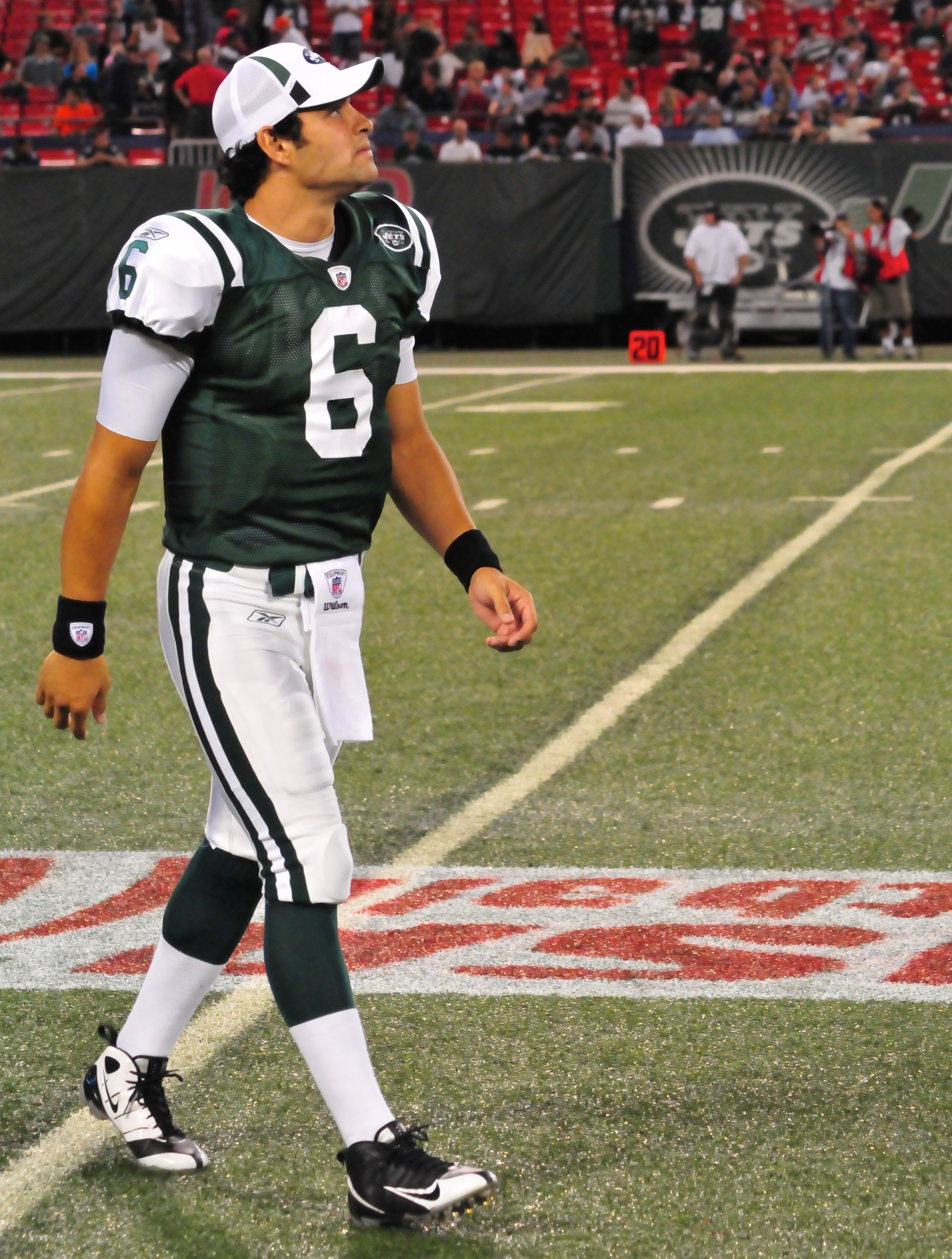
Despite leading the Jets to back-to-back AFC Championship Game appearances, Mark Sanchez failed to establish himself as the long-term solution at quarterback.

The Jets' first regular season home game at the new stadium was on September 13, 2010, and was shown nationwide on Monday Night Football. New York lost to the Ravens 10–9, but built a 9–2 record, tied for the division lead with the Patriots (whom the Jets had beaten once) going into a Monday night game at New England. Expectations of a Jets victory were high, but the Jets were defeated, 45–3. New York recovered to qualify for the AFC playoffs as the sixth and final seed. In the wild card round, the Jets defeated Indianapolis, 17–16. This victory sent the Jets to a rematch with New England. The Jets upset the Patriots, 28–21, setting up an AFC Championship Game at Pittsburgh. The Jets fell behind 24–0, and mounted a second-half comeback before losing to the Steelers, 24–19. In 2011, Ryan promised a Super Bowl appearance. The Jets played the Giants in the next-to-last week of the regular season with both teams still alive for playoff berths. The Jets lost to the Giants, and the following week to the Dolphins, finishing 8–8 and missing the playoffs, while the Giants used their victory over their in-stadium rivals to launch a winning streak which culminated in the Super Bowl XLVI championship, again defeating the Patriots.

Sanchez did not perform as well in 2011 as he had the previous two years. In March 2012, Colts quarterback Peyton Manning signed with Denver, making Broncos quarterback Tim Tebow expendable. Tebow had won considerable public attention in 2011 by leading the Broncos on an unexpected playoff run. On March 21, 2012, the Jets acquired Tebow from the Broncos in a trade involving lower-round draft picks. Despite a season-long quarterback controversy and a poor 2012 for Sanchez, Tebow was little-used. Third-string quarterback Greg McElroy started late in the year but was ineffective, as the Jets fell to 6–10, their first losing season under Ryan. On December 31, 2012, the Jets fired Tannenbaum, but announced that Ryan would remain as head coach. The Jets announced the hiring of Seahawks Vice President of Football Operations John Idzik as general manager on January 18, 2013. On April 29, soon after the team took West Virginia quarterback Geno Smith in the 2013 NFL draft, Tebow was released by the Jets.

The quarterback controversy between Smith and Sanchez was settled when Sanchez was injured in the 2013 preseason; he subsequently had surgery that ended his year. The Jets were inconsistent behind Smith, and finished 8–8, though knocking the Dolphins out of the playoff picture with a final-week victory. Ryan's contract was due to expire after 2014, but the head coach was given a multi-year extension on January 16 of that year. Sanchez was released on March 21, 2014, allowing the Jets to sign controversial former Falcons and Eagles quarterback Michael Vick. In 2014, the Jets went 4–12, last in passing until a final-game victory at the Dolphins. Both Idzik and Ryan were fired on December 29, 2014, the day after the season ended.

== Struggle for success (2015–present) ==
=== Todd Bowles comes and goes ===
On January 13, 2015, the Jets announced the hiring of Mike Maccagnan, scouting director of the Houston Texans, as general manager. The following day, the Jets announced they had hired Arizona Cardinals defensive coordinator Todd Bowles as head coach. Smith was injured in a locker room brawl in training camp, and journeyman Ryan Fitzpatrick took over. After a slow start, the Jets got hot late in the season and had their playoff fate in their own hands going into a final week game at the Bills, coached by Ryan. The Jets lost, and a victory by the Steelers over the Browns put the Jets out of the playoffs, though they finished 10–6.

The 2016 season began with high hopes, but a locker room altercation in Week 3, ineffective play by Fitzpatrick and the two other quarterbacks who started during the season, and key injuries led to a 5–11 record. There were rumors Bowles and Maccagnan would be fired; the Jets quickly announced their retention after a final-game victory versus the Bills. In 2017, the Jets were expected to be among the worst in the league, but did a little better than that, finishing 5–11, for the most part with Josh McCown at quarterback. The 2018 Jets finished 4–12, despite some promise shown by rookie quarterback Sam Darnold, and Bowles was fired.

=== Adam Gase years ===
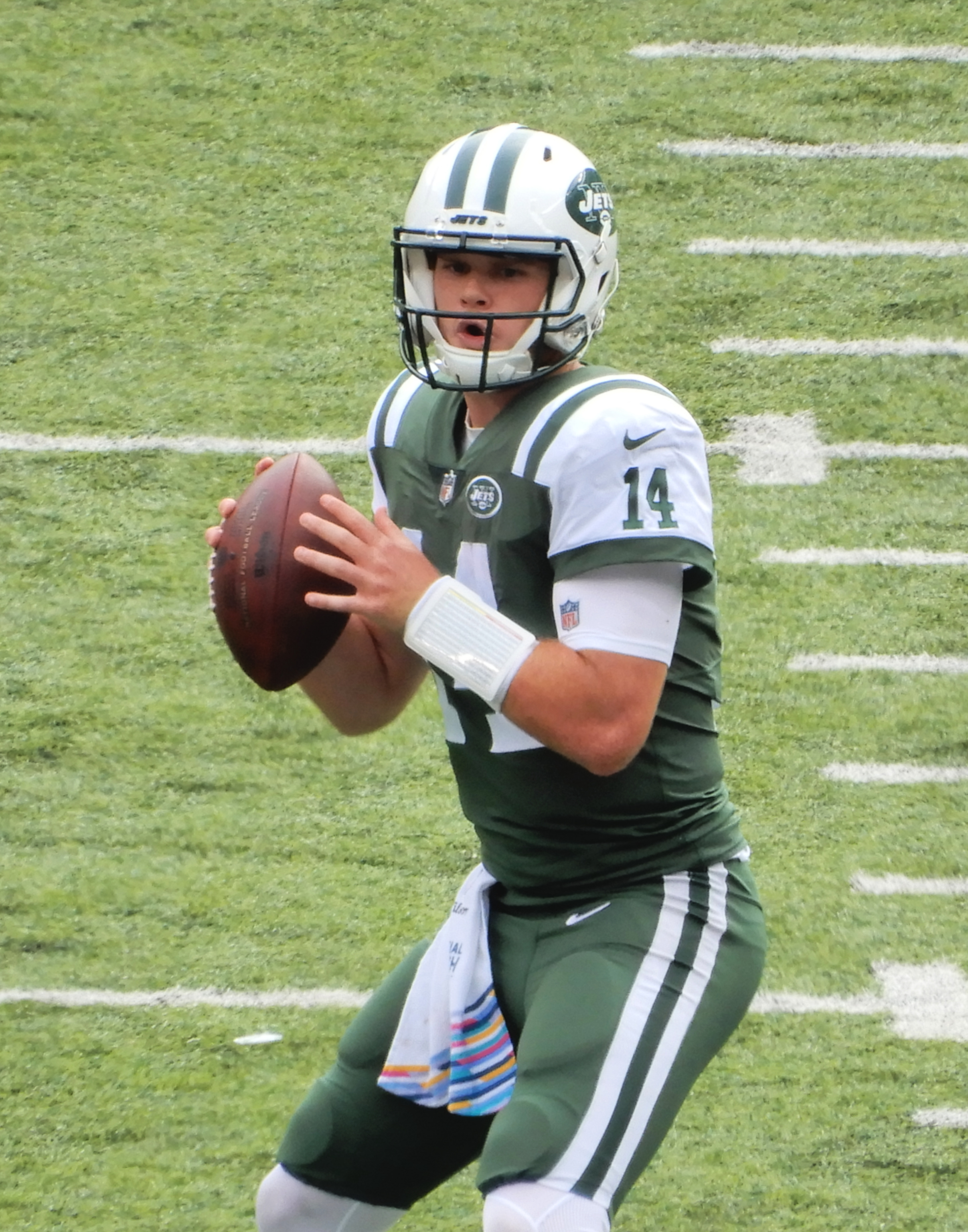
Quarterback Sam Darnold, the third overall pick of the 2018 NFL draft, lasted just three seasons with the team before being traded.

On January 11, 2019, the day before the 50th anniversary of their sole Super Bowl win, the Jets announced that former Dolphins coach Adam Gase had been hired to replace Bowles. When free agency opened, the Jets signed players such as Le'Veon Bell and C. J. Mosley at a total cost of over $100 million. On May 14, Maccagnan was fired, with Gase made acting general manager. Maccagnan's replacement was Joe Douglas, an Eagles executive and former player, hired June 7, 2019.

For the 2019 NFL season, the Jets announced new uniforms, resembling the ones they had worn in the 1980s, and including an all-black alternative. The Jets started the 2019 season 1–4 with Darnold out due to mononucleosis. They recovered to some extent with a 6–2 second half of the season to finish 7–9; Bell failed to reach 100 yards in any game.

The following season saw some turmoil, as starting safety Jamal Adams demanded and was granted a trade to the Seattle Seahawks. After an 0–5 start to the season, Bell was released by the Jets after reports of being unhappy with the team. The Jets' winless slump continued to week 14, resulting in a franchise-worst 0–13 start, before the team won its first game, against the Los Angeles Rams, but finished 2–14 with a final week loss to the Patriots, their tenth straight loss to New England. On January 3, 2021, hours after the Jets concluded their season with their worst record since 1996, Gase was fired.

=== Robert Saleh and Aaron Glenn ===
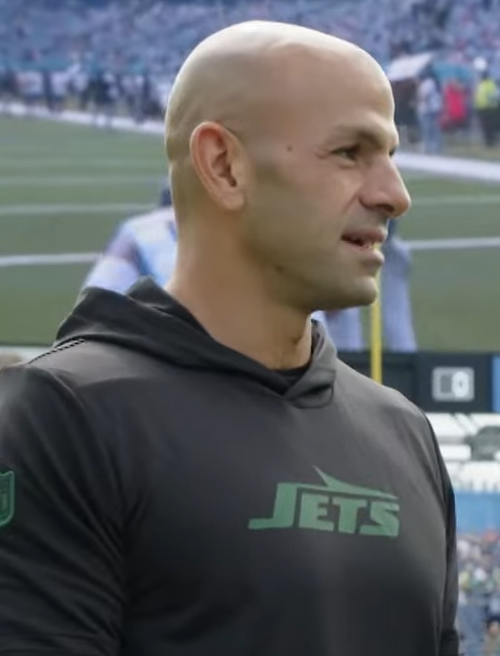
Robert Saleh, head coach of the Jets from 2021 to 2024

On January 14, 2021, the Jets announced the hiring of San Francisco 49ers defensive coordinator Robert Saleh as the new head coach. They also traded Sam Darnold to the Carolina Panthers and drafted Zach Wilson from Brigham Young University with the second overall pick in the 2021 NFL draft to replace him. Wilson was inconsistent in 2021 as the Jets finished 4–13 in the new, expanded 17-game season, finishing with a 27–10 loss to Buffalo in which the Jets gained only 53 yards on offense, lowest in franchise history. They finished fourth in the division, five games behind the third-place Dolphins, and won no divisional games for a second straight year. They had back-to-back seasons with 13 or more losses for only the second time (1995 and 1996 being the other), and extended their streak of finishing out of the playoffs to 11 straight years, the longest current streak in the NFL. In 2022, the Jets improved their record to 7–10, but lost their last six games as Wilson struggled to establish himself. The Jets finished last in the division, out of the playoffs again.

In April 2023, after the Seattle Mariners of MLB and the Sacramento Kings of the NBA, clinched a playoff berth for the first time since the 2001 MLB Postseason and 2006 NBA Playoffs respectively, the Jets and the Buffalo Sabres of the NHL claimed the longest current postseason drought in major North American sports, not having made the playoffs since 2010-11 NFL Playoffs and the 2011 Stanley Cup Playoffs. That month, the Jets acquired Super Bowl-winning quarterback Aaron Rodgers from the Packers in an exchange of draft picks. The 39-year-old predicted that the Jets were capable of winning a second Super Bowl trophy.

There was much anticipation leading up to the start of the 2023 NFL season, with the Jets appearing on Hard Knocks and speculation that Rodgers could lead the Jets to the Super Bowl. When the Jets began the season, on Monday Night Football against the Bills, Rodgers was sacked and injured without completing his first pass as a Jet. Zach Wilson replaced him, leading the Jets to a 22–16 overtime victory, a win overshadowed by the injury to Rodgers, which proved to be a torn Achilles tendon, ending his season. Wilson was injured again, replaced by Trevor Siemian, and the Jets finished 7–10, out of the playoffs again, though they did beat the Patriots in the final game for the first time since 2015 and the first time in New England since the 2010 playoffs. Saleh was retained for a fourth season despite a 19–32 record and Douglas for a sixth despite a record of 28–55. On April 22, 2024, the Jets traded Wilson to the Broncos along with a seventh-round draft pick in 2024 in exchange for a sixth-round pick.

Rodgers returned for the 2024 season, but Saleh was fired on October 8, 2024, after the Jets lost a 23–17 game to the Vikings in London that dropped the Jets to 2–3, the first time in Woody Johnson's tenure as owner that he had fired a coach mid-season. Defensive coordinator Jeff Ulbrich was named interim head coach. Following five losses in the following six games, Douglas was fired on November 18, with only the Panthers (27–66) having a worse record than the Jets (30–64) during the time Douglas was general manager of the Jets. Former Browns general manager Phil Savage was hired as interim replacement. The Jets extended their playoff drought to 14 seasons, the longest in their history, with an overtime loss to the Dolphins on December 8 that worsened their record to 3–10. The Jets finished the season 5–12.

On January 22, 2025, the Jets hired Aaron Glenn as head coach. Glenn, the defensive coordinator for the Detroit Lions, played for the Jets from 1994 to 2001. Three days later, the Jets announced the hiring of Broncos assistant general manager Darren Mougey as New York's general manager. On February 13, 2025, the Jets announced that Rodgers would not return in 2025. The Jets signed Steelers quarterback Justin Fields as a free agent on March 10, 2025. The Jets went 3–14 in 2025, their fifteenth straight year without a playoff berth, becoming the first team in NFL history to finish with zero interceptions. Rodgers had signed with the Steelers and led them to the playoffs, while Fields was repeatedly benched and was criticized for his play by Woody Johnson. Darnold, the Jets' first-round draft pick in 2018 (third overall), who had been traded to the Panthers after little success in New York, led the Seahawks to a victory in Super Bowl LX.

In March 2026, the Jets traded Fields to Kansas City for a sixth-round draft pick, following the Jets re-acquiring Geno Smith from Seattle. When the Buffalo Sabres made the playoffs in 2026, the Jets were left with the longest current major league playoff drought.

Sportswriter Eskenazi, in his history of the Jets, wrote:

The Jets are in that pantheon [of teams that have won championships]. And they are housed there despite having only one title, one defining image. Because they have never repeated, there is the constant of failed expectations. Unfair, perhaps ... But this is the nature of sports. The Jets achieved such fame, such notoriety, became such a product and symbol of their times, that they also became a frozen icon. They can have life breathed back into them only by another great success. In the meantime, they and their fans have had to live with their moment in the sun.

== See also ==
- List of New York Jets seasons

== Bibliography ==
- Cannizzaro, Mark (2007). Tales from the New York Jets Sideline (Revised ed.). Champaign, Illinois: Sports Publishing. ISBN 978-1-59670-244-8.
- Eskenazi, Gerald (1998). Gang Green: An Irreverent Look Behind the Scenes at Thirty-Eight (Well, Thirty-Seven) Seasons of New York Jets Football Futility. New York: Simon and Schuster. ISBN 978-0-684-84115-1.
- Hanks, Stephen (1989). The Game that Changed Pro Football. New York: Carol Publishing Group. ISBN 978-1-55972-012-0.
- Lange, Randy (2005). Stadium Stories: New York Jets. Guilford, Connecticut: The Globe Pequot Press. ISBN 978-0-7627-3783-3.
- Pervin, Lawrence A. (2009). Football's New York Giants: A History. Jefferson, North Carolina: McFarland & Co. ISBN 978-0-7864-4268-3.
- Ryczek, William J. (2009). Crash of the Titans: The Early Years of the New York Jets and the AFL (revised ed.). Jefferson, North Carolina: McFarland & Co. ISBN 978-0-7864-4126-6.
- Sahadi, Lou (1969). The Long Pass: The Inside Story of the New York Jets from the Terrible Titans to Broadway Joe Namath and the Championship of 1968. New York: The World Publishing Company. ISBN 978-1-58567-933-1.
