= Donald C. Lillis =

American business and sports executive (1901 – 1968)

- Lillis (right) with Sonny Werblin and Weeb Ewbank
- Born: September 6, 1901; Niagara Falls, New York, U.S.
- Died: July 23, 1968 (aged 66); Westerly, Rhode Island, U.S.
- Occupations: President of Bowie Race Track (1953–1966); President of the New York Jets (1968)

Donald Chase Lillis (September 6, 1901 – July 23, 1968) was an American business and sports executive who served as the president of Bowie Race Track and the New York Jets.

== Early life ==
Lillis was born on September 6, 1901, in Niagara Falls, New York. He grew up in Buffalo, New York, where his father worked as a trainmaster for the Lehigh Valley Railroad. Lillis attended Columbia University and the University at Buffalo Law School, but did not graduate from either.

== Business career ==
Lillis was a vice president of the Manufacturers & Traders Trust Co. and manager of the trading department of Laurence M. Marks & Co. before joining Bear, Stearns, & Co. in 1943. He became a general partner in 1945 and a limited partner in 1957. Lillis also served as president of Chesapeake & Potomac Airways, chairman of the Nuclear Corporation of America and the National Can Company, and was a director of Piasecki Aircraft, Pabst Brewing Company, the New York, New Haven and Hartford Railroad, and Star Electric Motor Company.

== Sports ==
=== Bowie Race Track ===
In 1952, Lillis was part of a syndicate led by former New York Yankees executive Larry MacPhail that purchased Bowie Race Track. On April 14, 1953, Macphail was barred from the track by the state racing commission for "conduct detrimental to the best interest of racing" following a profane argument with two directors of the Maryland chapter of the National Horsemen's Benevolent and Protective Association. Three days later, the track's board of directors removed MacPhail as president and replaced him with Lillis. E. R. E. Carter, a Canadian mining executive, purchased controlling interest in the track in 1962, but retained Lillis as president. He resigned in 1966 to focus on his business dealings in New York City.

=== New York Jets ===
In 1963, Lillis and four other New York businessmen purchased the New York Jets from Harry Wismer after he declared bankruptcy. The group was led by Sonny Werblin until 1968, when Lillis and the three other partners (Leon Hess, Philip H. Iselin, and Townsend B. Martin), unhappy with their minor role in the team, asked to be bought out. Werblin could not afford this and instead sold his stake in the Jets to the other four. Lillis was chosen to succeed Werblin as team president and took over on May 23, 1968. His tenure as president was short-lived, as he died of a heart ailment on July 23, 1968.
