= Philip H. Iselin =

American businessman

- Born: September 1, 1902; Port Washington, New York, US
- Died: December 28, 1976 (aged 74); New York City, US
- Occupations: Clothing manufacturer, sports team owner, racetrack owner
- Board member of: Korell Corporation, New York Jets, Monmouth Park Racetrack
- Spouse: Betty Bing
- Children: 2
- Honors: Philip H. Iselin Stakes at Monmouth Park

Philip H. Iselin (September 1, 1902 – December 28, 1976) was a New York City women's apparel manufacturer who was a shareholder and President of the New York Jets football team and Chairman of Monmouth Park Racetrack in Oceanport, New Jersey. He was a member of the original Board of Directors that bought the New York Titans in 1963 and renamed the franchise the Jets. In 1968, he succeeded Donald C. Lillis as President of the Jets.

A member of The Jockey Club, Iselin and Amory L. Haskell headed a group of investors who founded the Monmouth Park Jockey Club in 1944 to build a new Thoroughbred horse racing facility in Oceanport, New Jersey. The track opened in 1946 and Iselin served as treasurer of the Monmouth Park Jockey Club until 1968 when he was appointed President.

Iselin's tenure as team president began with the Jets winning Super Bowl III. The ballclub eventually went into decline, failing to achieve a winning record in each of the last seven seasons with Iselin in charge from 1970 to 1976. He was one of the most vocal supporters for keeping all ten American Football League teams in the same conference as part of the AFL–NFL merger.

Iselin died of a heart attack at age 74 in the Jets' Manhattan offices on 28 December 1976. He had been working on finding a new head coach to succeed Lou Holtz. He had suffered a cardiac arrest while watching the Jets' 46–3 loss to the Denver Broncos at Mile High Stadium three months earlier on 19 September.

Son James "Jimmy" Iselin became a racehorse trainer.
