= 1985 San Diego Chargers season =

NFL team season

- Owner: Alex Spanos
- General manager: Johnny Sanders
- Head coach: Don Coryell
- Home stadium: Jack Murphy Stadium

Results
- Record: 8–8
- Division place: 3rd AFC West
- Playoffs: Did not qualify
- All-Pros: 1: QB Dan Fouts (2nd team)
- Pro Bowlers: 2: WR Wes Chandler; QB Dan Fouts

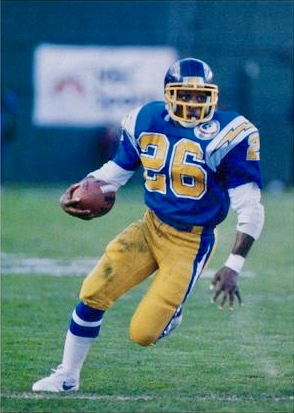
Running back Lionel James set an NFL record with 2,535 all-purpose yards.

The 1985 San Diego Chargers season was the franchise's 16th season in the National Football League (NFL), its 26th overall. The team improved on their 7–9 record from 1984 to an 8–8 finish. For the third time in five years, the Chargers led the league in scoring. It was Don Coryell's final full season as the team's head coach, as he would resign halfway through the following season after a 1–7 start.

== NFL draft ==
1985 San Diego Chargers draft
Round	Pick	Player	Position	College	Notes
1	12	Jim Lachey *	Offensive Tackle	Ohio State	
2	39	Wayne Davis	Cornerback	Indiana State	
2	55	Jeffery Dale	Safety	LSU	
3	69	John Hendy	Safety	Long Beach State	
4	96	Ralf Mojsiejenko *	Punter	Michigan State	
6	150	Terry Lewis	Defensive back	Michigan State	
7	196	Mark Fellows	Linebacker	Montana State	
8	207	Curtis Adams	Running back	Central Michigan	
9	234	Paul Berner	Quarterback	University of the Pacific	
9	252	Dan Remsberg	Offensive Tackle	Abilene Christian	
10	264	David King	Defensive back	Auburn	
11	291	Jeff Smith	Defensive tackle	Kentucky	
12	318	Tony Simmons	Defensive end	Tennessee	
12	329	Bret Pearson	Tight end	Wisconsin	
Made roster * Made at least one Pro Bowl during career

== Personnel ==
=== Staff ===
1985 San Diego Chargers staff
Front office: Owner/president – Alex Spanos; General manager – Johnny Sanders; Head coaches: Head coach – Don Coryell; Offensive coaches: Offensive coordinator – Dave Levy; Quarterbacks/passing game coordinator – Ernie Zampese; Running backs – Earnel Durden; Wide receivers – Al Saunders; Special offensive assistant – Marv Braden	Defensive coaches: Defensive coordinator – Dave Adolph; Defensive coordinator – Tom Bass; Defensive quality control – Jim L. Mora; Defensive line – Gunther Cunningham; Linebackers – Chuck Weber; Defensive backs – Jim Wagstaff; Special teams coaches: Special teams – Hank Bauer

=== Roster ===
1985 San Diego Chargers roster
Quarterbacks (QB): 14 Dan Fouts; 9 Mark Herrmann; Running backs (RB): 40 Gary Anderson; 31 Anthony Corley; 26 Lionel James; 21 Buford McGee; 43 Tim Spencer; Wide receivers (WR): 86 Jesse Bendross; 89 Wes Chandler; 18 Charlie Joiner; 83 Trumaine Johnson; Tight ends (TE): 88 Pete Holohan; 85 Eric Sievers; 80 Kellen Winslow	Offensive linemen (OL): 61 Ken Dallafior C/G; 65 Jerry Doerger T; 74 Jim Lachey T; 63 Jim Leonard G; 62 Don Macek C; 60 Dennis McKnight G; 66 Rich Umphrey C; 67 Ed White G; Defensive linemen (DL): 78 Chuck Ehin NT; 92 Scott Garnett NT; 97 Tony Simmons DE; 99 Lee Williams DE; 93 Earl Wilson DE	Linebackers (LB): 58 Mike Green; 53 Mike Guendling OLB; 57 Linden King OLB; 51 Woodrow Lowe OLB; 55 Derrie Nelson ILB; 56 Vince Osby ILB; 90 Fred Robinson OLB; Defensive backs (DB): 22 Gill Byrd SS; 37 Jeffery Dale FS; 21 Wayne Davis CB; 29 John Hendy CB; 32 Terry Lewis CB; 24 Miles McPherson FS; 27 Ronnie O'Bard CB; 33 Lucious Smith CB; 23 Danny Walters CB; Special teams (ST): 2 Ralf Mojsiejenko P; 16 Bob Thomas K	Reserve: 42 Curtis Adams RB (IR); 6 Rolf Benirschke K (IR); 59 Craig Bingham LB (IR); 50 Carlos Bradley LB (IR); 77 Sam Claphan T (IR); -- Ron Egloff TE (IR); 84 Chris Faulkner TE (IR); 52 Mark Fellows LB (IR); 30 David King CB (IR); 68 Gary Kowalski T (IR); -- Bobby Micho TE (IR); -- Shane Nelson LB (IR); 64 Bill Searcey G (IR); 54 Billy Ray Smith LB (IR); Rookies in italics

== Preseason ==
Week	Date	Opponent	Result	Record	Venue	Attendance
1	August 4	Cleveland Browns	W 12–7	1–0	Jack Murphy Stadium	
2	August 11	Dallas Cowboys	L 24–27	1–1	Jack Murphy Stadium	
3	August 18	at San Francisco 49ers	L 10–25	2–1	Candlestick Park	
4	August 23	New Orleans Saints	W 21–20	2–2	Jack Murphy Stadium	

== Regular season ==
=== Schedule ===
Week	Date	Opponent	Result	Record	Venue	Attendance	Recap
1	September 8	at Buffalo Bills	**W** 14–9	1–0	Rich Stadium	67,597	Recap
2	September 15	**Seattle Seahawks**	**L** 35–49	1–1	Jack Murphy Stadium	54,420	Recap
3	September 22	at Cincinnati Bengals	**W** 44–41	2–1	Riverfront Stadium	52,270	Recap
4	September 29	Cleveland Browns	**L** 7–21	2–2	Jack Murphy Stadium	52,107	Recap
5	October 6	at **Seattle Seahawks**	**L** 21–26	2–3	Kingdome	61,300	Recap
6	October 13	**Kansas City Chiefs**	**W** 31–20	3–3	Jack Murphy Stadium	50,067	Recap
7	October 20	at Minnesota Vikings	**L** 17–21	3–4	Hubert H. Humphrey Metrodome	61,670	Recap
8	October 28	at **Los Angeles Raiders**	**L** 21–34	3–5	Los Angeles Memorial Coliseum	69,297	Recap
9	November 3	**Denver Broncos**	**W** 30–10	4–5	Jack Murphy Stadium	57,312	Recap
10	November 10	**Los Angeles Raiders**	**W** 40–34 (OT)	5–5	Jack Murphy Stadium	58,566	Recap
11	November 17	at **Denver Broncos**	**L** 24–30 (OT)	5–6	Mile High Stadium	74,376	Recap
12	November 24	at Houston Oilers	**L** 35–37	5–7	Houston Astrodome	34,336	Recap
13	December 1	Buffalo Bills	**W** 40–7	6–7	Jack Murphy Stadium	45,487	Recap
14	December 8	Pittsburgh Steelers	**W** 54–44	7–7	Jack Murphy Stadium	52,098	Recap
15	December 15	Philadelphia Eagles	**W** 20–14	8–7	Jack Murphy Stadium	45,569	Recap
16	December 22	at **Kansas City Chiefs**	**L** 34–38	8–8	Arrowhead Stadium	18,178	Recap
Note: Intra-division opponents are in **bold** text.

=== Game summaries ===
All game reports use the Pro Football Researchers' gamebook archive as a source.

==== Week 1: at Buffalo Bills ====
Week One: San Diego Chargers at Buffalo Bills – Game summary

Quarter	1	2	3	4	Total
Chargers	7	7	0	0	**14**
Bills	3	6	0	0	**9**

at Rich Stadium, Buffalo, New York

- Date: September 8
- Game time: 4:00 p.m. EDT
- Game weather: 76 °F (24.4 °C), relative humidity 83%, wind 11 miles per hour (18 km/h; 9.6 kn)
- Game attendance: 67,597
- Referee: Dick Jorgensen
- TV announcers (NBC): Phil Stone and Reggie Rucker
- Box score

Game information

**First quarter**

- SDG – Curtis Adams 1-yard run (Rolf Benirschke kick), 10:48. Chargers 7–0. **Drive: 7 plays, 70 yards, 4:12.**
- BUF – Scott Norwood 46-yard field goal, 1:40. Chargers 7–3. **Drive: 10 plays, 69 yards, 3:45.**

**Second quarter**

- BUF – Scott Norwood 34-yard field goal, 14:12. Chargers 7–6. **Drive: 6 plays, 43 yards, 1:15.**
- SDG – Eric Sievers 30-yard pass from Dan Fouts (Rolf Benirschke kick), 3:46. Chargers 14–6. **Drive: 3 plays, 46 yards, 0:55.**
- BUF – Scott Norwood 29-yard field goal, 3:05. Chargers 14–9. **Drive: 7 plays, 59 yards, 2:13.**

**Third quarter**

- No scoring plays

**Fourth quarter**

- No scoring plays

**Top passers**

- SDG – Dan Fouts – 16/29, 218 yards, TD, INT
- BUF – Vince Ferragamo – 31/46, 377 yards, 2 INT

**Top rushers**

- SDG – Curtis Adams – 16 rushes, 49 yards, TD
- BUF – Greg Bell – 23 rushes, 79 yards

**Top receivers**

- SDG – Charlie Joiner – 4 receptions, 62 yards
- BUF – Jerry Butler – 4 receptions, 140 yards

San Diego took the opening kickoff and drove 70 yards with Fouts completing all three of his passes for 49 yards; Adams finished the drive by scoring a touchdown less than five minutes into his NFL career. After a pair of Buffalo field goals, Byrd's 3rd-down tackle forced the Bills to punt from their own 11, and San Diego took over on the Buffalo 46. Three plays later, Sievers broke a tackle and took a short pass in for a 30-yard touchdown. The Bills added another field goal to make the halftime score 14–9.

There were no points scored in the second half, despite chances for both teams. Lowe stopped a Buffalo drive by intercepting a deflected pass near midfield, but Fouts was intercepted himself five plays later. On the next Charger drive they gained a 1st and 10 at the Buffalo 12, but Fouts fumbled the snap and the Bills recovered. Buffalo then drove deep into Charger territory before Dale forced a fumble that Ransom recovered at his own 11. The Bills crossed midfield on their next two possessions as well, but one drive ended with a punt and the other with a Mike Green interception. Taking over with 3:26 to play, the Chargers gained one first down through Sievers, then reached a 4th and 3 at the Buffalo 30. They went for a game-clinching conversion, but Anthony Steels was stopped for a gain of only 2. The Bills started their final drive with no timeouts and 1:33 to work with, and reached the Charger 42 with 16 seconds left. Vince Ferragamo then completed an 18-yard pass to Eric Richardson, who was tackled by Lowe before he could get out of bounds, allowing the clock to run out.

Despite being outgained by 455 yards to 308, San Diego allowed no touchdowns for the first time since Week 1, 1982.

==== Week 2: vs. Seattle Seahawks ====
Week Two: Seattle Seahawks at San Diego Chargers – Game summary

Quarter	1	2	3	4	Total
Seahawks	7	7	28	7	**49**
Chargers	10	13	6	6	**35**

at Jack Murphy Stadium, San Diego, California

- Date: September 15
- Game time: 1:00 p.m. PDT
- Game weather: 70 °F (21.1 °C), relative humidity 73%, wind 8 miles per hour (13 km/h; 7.0 kn)
- Game attendance: 54,420
- Referee: Red Cashion
- TV announcers (NBC): Charlie Jones and Sam Rutigliano
- Box score

Game information

**First quarter**

- SDG – Lionel James 7-yard pass from Dan Fouts (Bob Thomas kick), 7:18. Chargers 7–0. **Drive: 4 plays, 64 yards, 1:31.**
- SDG – Bob Thomas 21-yard field goal, 3:53. Chargers 10–0. **Drive: 9 plays, 65 yards, 2:23.**
- SEA – Daryl Turner 34-yard pass from Dave Krieg (Norm Johnson kick), 0:37. Chargers 10–7. **Drive: 6 plays, 74 yards, 3:06.**

**Second quarter**

- SEA – Curt Warner 3-yard run (Norm Johnson kick), 14:10. Seahawks 14–10. **Drive: 3 plays, 31 yards, 0:18.**
- SDG – Charlie Joiner 18-yard pass from Dan Fouts (kick blocked), 3:32. Chargers 16–14. **Drive: 11 plays, 80 yards, 4:59.**
- SDG – Wes Chandler 20-yard pass from Dan Fouts (Bob Thomas kick), 0:53. Chargers 23–14. **Drive: 4 plays, 80 yards, 0:57.**

**Third quarter**

- SEA – Steve Largent 6-yard pass from Dave Krieg (Norm Johnson kick), 10:42. Chargers 23–21. **Drive: 11 plays, 75 yards, 4:18.**
- SDG – Eric Sievers 5-yard pass from Dan Fouts (kick failed, wide left), 8:47. Chargers 29–21. **Drive: 4 plays, 79 yards, 1:55.**
- SEA – Daryl Turner 15-yard pass from Dave Krieg (Norm Johnson kick), 6:38. Chargers 29–28. **Drive: 6 plays, 78 yards, 2:09.**
- SEA – Daryl Turner 30-yard pass from Dave Krieg (Norm Johnson kick), 2:22. Seahawks 35–29. **Drive: 5 plays, 80 yards, 3:06.**
- SEA – Curt Warner 1-yard run (Norm Johnson kick), 0:15. Seahawks 42–29 **Drive: 5 plays, 41 yards, 1:37.**

**Fourth quarter**

- SEA – Daryl Turner 7-yard pass from Dave Krieg (Norm Johnson kick), 12:10. Seahawks 49–29. **Drive: 6 plays, 46 yards, 2:42.**
- SDG – Charlie Joiner 1-yard pass from Mark Herrmann (kick blocked), 0:11. Seahawks 49–35. **Drive: 7 plays, 74 yards, 1:45.**

**Top passers**

- SEA – Dave Krieg – 22/32, 307 yards, 5 TD
- SDG – Dan Fouts – 29/43, 440 yards, 4 TD, INT

**Top rushers**

- SEA – Curt Warner – 28 rushes, 169 yards, 2 TD
- SDG – Lionel James – 8 rushes, 41 yards

**Top receivers**

- SEA – Daryl Turner – 7 receptions, 124 yards, 4 TD
- SDG – Wes Chandler – 13 receptions, 243 yards, TD

After one punt for each team, Fouts threw completions on all four plays of the first Charger touchdown drive. Fouts started the next drive with four further completions, but eventually missed on a pair of throws from the Seattle 4, leading to Thomas' first field goal for the team, Seattle pulled back to within 10–7, then Fouts was sacked at his own 4-yard line, leading to good Seahawks field position after San Diego punted. Seattle took their first lead three plays later. Following an exchange of punts, the Chargers faced a 3rd and 22 at their own 20, which James narrowly converted on a pass from Fouts. That led to Joiner's first touchdown, and Sievers' 29-yard catch on the next possession came two plays before Chandler scored to make it 23–14. Thomas came on to extend the lead with a 53-yard field goal before halftime, but never got to attempt the kick due to a bad snap.

Seattle opened the second half with a touchdown drive. Fouts and Chandler combined for 45 yards on the next play from scrimmage, setting up Sievers' short touchdown catch and a 29–21 lead. From there, Seattle scored four touchdowns without reply, with an interception and a fumble from Fouts setting up two of the scores. Overall, the Seahawks scored on their first five possessions of the second half to take a 49–29 lead less than three minutes into the final quarter. Fouts led his team to the Seattle 25 with seven minutes to play, but was sacked lost a fumble; Herrmann came in and led the threw the game's final touchdown.

Fouts had 306 of his 440 passing yards in the first half. As a team, the Chargers had 494 passing yards, a franchise record that still stands as of 2022. The combined 10 touchdowns were the most in an NFL game since 1969.

==== Week 3: at Cincinnati Bengals ====
Week Three: San Diego Chargers at Cincinnati Bengals – Game summary

Quarter	1	2	3	4	Total
Chargers	3	17	14	10	**44**
Bengals	7	6	21	7	**41**

at Riverfront Stadium, Cincinnati, Ohio

- Date: September 22
- Game time: 1:00 p.m. EDT
- Game weather: 71 °F (21.7 °C), relative humidity 56%, wind 9 miles per hour (14 km/h; 7.8 kn)
- Game attendance: 52,270
- Referee: Gene Barth
- TV announcers (NBC): Phil Stone and Bob Kuechenberg
- Box score

Game information

**First quarter**

- SDG – Bob Thomas 20-yard field goal, 8:18. Chargers 3–0. **Drive: 8 plays, 48 yards, 3:42.**
- CIN – Cris Collinsworth 18-yard pass from Boomer Esiason (Jim Breech kick), 3:53. Bengals 7–3. **Drive: 9 plays, 75 yards, 4:25.**

**Second quarter**

- SDG – Eric Sievers 4-yard pass from Dan Fouts (Bob Thomas kick), 14:15. Chargers 10–7. **Drive: 8 plays, 73 yards, 4:38.**
- SDG – Eric Sievers 5-yard pass from Dan Fouts (Bob Thomas kick), 8:55. Chargers 17–7. **Drive: 7 plays, 84 yards, 2:41.**
- CIN – James Brooks 1-yard run (kick failed, hit right upright), 6:53. Chargers 17–13. **Drive: 3 plays, 41 yards, 2:02.**
- SDG – Bob Thomas 28-yard field goal, 0:27. Chargers 20–13. **Drive: 6 plays, 28 yards, 2:36.**

**Third quarter**

- CIN – Cris Collinsworth 16-yard pass from Boomer Esiason (Jim Breech kick), 13:48. Tied 20–20. **Drive: 4 plays, 56 yards, 1:12.**
- SDG – Pete Holohan 3-yard pass from Dan Fouts (Bob Thomas kick), 12:43. Chargers 27–20. **Drive: 3 plays, 64 yards, 1:05.**
- CIN – Larry Kinnebrew 4-yard run (Jim Breech kick), 6:42. Tied 27–27. **Drive: 11 plays, 66 yards, 6:01.**
- CIN – Stanford Jennings 11-yard pass from Boomer Esiason (Jim Breech kick), 1:28. Bengals 34–27. **Drive: 7 plays, 47 yards, 3:25.**
- SDG – Lionel James 56-yard run (Bob Thomas kick), 0:17. Tied 34–34. **Drive: 3 plays, 71 yards, 1:11.**

**Fourth quarter**

- CIN – Larry Kinnebrew 8-yard run (Jim Breech kick), 4:39. Bengals 41–34. **Drive: 4 plays, 21 yards, 2:08.**
- SDG – Lionel James 60-yard pass from Dan Fouts (Bob Thomas kick), 3:45. Tied 41–41. **Drive: 2 plays, 66 yards, 0:54.**
- SDG – Bob Thomas 34-yard field goal, 0:04. Chargers 44–41. **Drive: 6 plays, 33 yards, 2:22.**

**Top passers**

- SDG – Dan Fouts – 25/43, 344 yards, 4 TD, 2 INT
- CIN – Boomer Esiason – 26/44, 320 yards, 3 TD, 2 INT

**Top rushers**

- SDG – Lionel James – 12 rushes, 127 yards, TD
- CIN – James Brooks – 16 rushes, 86 yards, TD

**Top receivers**

- SDG – Lionel James – 5 receptions, 118 yards, TD
- CIN – Cris Collinsworth – 10 receptions, 161 yards, 2 TD

Steels ran the opening kickoff back 54 yards, but Fouts was intercepted three plays later. Boomer Esiason was intercepted by Walters two plays after that, leading to a missed 52-yard field goal from Thomas; he made a 20-yard chip shot on the next Charger drive. On the ensuing drive, San Diego committed an offsides penalty on a 4th and 2, leading to the game's first touchdown. The Chargers responded through Sievers' 4-yard touchdown catch on 3rd and 3. Cincinnati moved to a 2nd and goal from the 7, but King sacked Esiason, forcing a fumble that Ferguson recovered. San Diego soon scored again, with James' leaping 34-yard catch setting up another Sievers touchdown. The Charger defense forced a three-and-out, but a Fouts pass was tipped and intercepted on the next play, and the Bengals converted the turnover into a touchdown. Late in the half, another tipped ball was intercepted by Walters, setting up a field goal and a 20–13 lead at the interval.

Cincinnati took the second half kickoff and tied the score with a touchdown drive that took barely a minute. San Diego were even quicker in their response: James ran the kickoff back 36 yards, Joiner had a 22-yard catch, James ran for 39 yards to the Cincinnati 3 and Holohan made a one-handed touchdown catch. The Bengals then tied the score again, before James had a 100-yard kickoff return touchdown nullified by penalty. San Diego were forced to punt, and Cincinnati drove for another touchdown to take the lead. James tied the game again at 34–34 when he took a draw play up the middle of the field and went untouched for 56 yards. In the final quarter, Smith recovered a Bengals fumble, but Joiner also lost a fumble on the ensuing drive, setting the Bengals up for a short touchdown drive and another lead. Two plays later, James again tied the game, this time catching a Fouts pass in stride 30 yards downfield behind two defenders before completing a 60-yard touchdown. The Bengals advanced to their own 42 before former Charger James Brooks fumbled and Ehin recovered with 2:26 to play. After three James runs and two Fouts completions, Thomas hit the winning kick with 4 seconds left.

James became the first Charger to both rush and receive for at least 100 yards in the same game; the next was Austin Ekeler in 2019. With a further 71 yards in punt and kickoff returns, he had 316 all-purpose yards, and would have broken the NFL record if his 100-yard return had counted. San Diego had five takeaways to three for the Bengals, and outgained their opponents by 517 yards to 448.

==== Week 4: vs. Cleveland Browns ====
Week Four: Cleveland Browns at San Diego Chargers – Game summary

Quarter	1	2	3	4	Total
Browns	0	7	7	7	**21**
Chargers	7	0	0	0	**7**

at Jack Murphy Stadium, San Diego, California

- Date: September 29
- Game time: 1:00 p.m. PDT
- Game weather: 69 °F (20.6 °C), relative humidity 72%, wind 9 miles per hour (14 km/h; 7.8 kn)
- Game attendance: 52,107
- Referee: Chuck Heberling
- TV announcers (NBC): Jay Randolph and Reggie Rucker
- Box score

Game information

**First quarter**

- SDG – Jesse Bendross 54-yard pass from Dan Fouts (Bob Thomas kick), 9:32. Chargers 7–0. **Drive: 9 plays, 93 yards, 3:43.**

**Second quarter**

- CLE – Kevin Mack 10-yard run (Matt Bahr kick), 2:24. Tied 7–7. **Drive: 7 plays, 37 yards, 2:58.**

**Third quarter**

- CLE – Earnest Byner 11-yard pass from Gary Danielson (Matt Bahr kick), 4:18. Browns 14–7. **Drive: 7 plays, 79 yards, 4:18.**

**Fourth quarter**

- CLE – Kevin Mack 10-yard pass from Gary Danielson (Matt Bahr kick), 4:40. Browns 21–7. **Drive: 11 plays, 80 yards, 0:18.**

**Top passers**

- CLE – Gary Danielson – 16/24, 170 yards, 2 TD
- SDG – Mark Herrmann – 16/23, 178 yards, 2 INT

**Top rushers**

- CLE – Kevin Mack – 16 rushes, 130 yards, TD
- SDG – Tim Spencer – 7 rushes, 28 yards

**Top receivers**

- CLE – Clarence Weathers – 4 receptions, 88 yards
- SDG – Jesse Bendross – 2 receptions, 77 yards, TD

Cleveland's Kevin Mack opened the game with a 61-yard run, with Dale catching him from behind to prevent a touchdown. John Hendy forced a fumble three plays later, with Byrd recovering, and the Chargers drove 93 yards the other way for their touchdown, with Bendross catching Fouts' pass at the 27 and capitalizing on Joiner's block to score. Fouts was knocked over while completing a pass on the next time San Diego had the ball, sustaining knee ligament damage and being forced out of the game soon afterwards. The Chargers did not score again. Herrmann did lead a 66-yard drive that bridged the 1st and 2nd quarters, but it ended with Thomas missing a 34-yard kick wide right. Herrmann's interception later in the quarter set up Cleveland for a 37-yard touchdown drive, which featured Gary Danielson's 12-yard run on 4th and 6. The halftime score was 7–7.

The second half featured only three drives for each team. San Diego crossed midfield on each of their first two possessions, but had to punt both times, and Cleveland responded with a touchdown both times. Herrmann led his offense as far as the Browns' 26, but was sacked for a loss of 9 yards and intercepted on the next play. Cleveland then ran off the final seven minutes of the game with five rushing first downs.

==== Week 5: at Seattle Seahawks ====
Week Five: San Diego Chargers at Seattle Seahawks – Game summary

Quarter	1	2	3	4	Total
Chargers	0	7	0	14	**21**
Seahawks	3	3	7	13	**26**

at Kingdome, Seattle, Washington

- Date: October 6
- Game time: 1:00 p.m. PDT
- Game weather: N/A (game played indoors)
- Game attendance: 61,300
- Referee: Bob Frederic
- TV announcers (NBC): Charlie Jones and Sam Rutigliano
- Box score

Game information

**First quarter**

- SEA – Norm Johnson 28-yard field goal, 10:01. Seahawks 3–0. **Drive: 4 plays, 4 yards, 1:26.**

**Second quarter**

- SEA – Norm Johnson 46-yard field goal, 11:41. Seahawks 6–0. **Drive: 6 plays, 48 yards, 2:15.**
- SDG – Wes Chandler 3-yard pass from Mark Herrmann (Bob Thomas kick), 0:43. Chargers 7–6. **Drive: 4 plays, 21 yards, 0:37.**

**Third quarter**

- SEA – Curt Warner 1-yard run (Norm Johnson kick), 11:42. Seahawks 13–7. **Drive: 4 plays, 33 yards, 1:01.**

**Fourth quarter**

- SEA – Curt Warner 18-yard run (pass failed), 10:55. Seahawks 19–7. **Drive: 2 plays, 25 yards, 0:15.**
- SDG – Wes Chandler 6-yard pass from Mark Herrmann (Bob Thomas kick), 8:33. Seahawks 19–14. **Drive: 5 plays, 94 yards, 2:13.**
- SEA – Steve Largent 14-yard pass from Dave Krieg (Norm Johnson kick), 3:15. Seahawks 26–14. **Drive: 11 plays, 81 yards, 5:09.**
- SDG – Charlie Joiner 9-yard pass from Mark Herrmann (Bob Thomas kick), 1:48. Seahawks 26–21. **Drive: 6 plays, 62 yards, 1:15.**

**Top passers**

- SDG – Mark Herrmann – 26/35, 344 yards, 3 TD, 3 INT
- SEA – Dave Krieg – 16/26, 189 yards, TD

**Top rushers**

- SDG – Gary Anderson – 8 rushes, 15 yards
- SEA – Curt Warner – 28 rushes, 94 yards, 2 TD

**Top receivers**

- SDG – Wes Chandler – 9 receptions, 150 yards, 2 TD
- SEA – Steve Largent – 5 receptions, 69 yards, TD

In the opening quarter, the newly-arrived Anderson was unable to hold Herrmann's pitch; Seattle recovered and capitalized with a field goal. They added another field goal after a 40-yard pass interference penalty on Davis. San Diego failed to cross midfield until their eighth possession, when Chandler's 59-yard reception moved the ball to the 7 yard line. Chandler seemed to have scored on the next play, but was ruled to have come down out of bounds; he protested the decision and was penalized 15 yards for unsportsmanlike conduct. Herrmann was intercepted two plays later. The Chargers soon got another chance when Williams sacked Krieg, forcing a fumble that Fred Robinson recovered. Chandler converted a 3rd and 6 with a 14-yard catch, and scored on the following play, putting the Chargers up 7–6 shortly before halftime.

Herrmann fumbled the snap on the first Charger play of the second half, with Seattle recovering and soon scoring a touchdown. After two punts each, Herrmann was intercepted to set up another Seahawks touchdown. A penalty on the ensuing kickoff forced the Chargers to start at their own 6, but Spencer took a pass 43 yards on the next play sparking a rapid drive for Chandler's second touchdown with 8:33 to play. San Diego's defense were unable to stop Seattle on the next drive, as they ran five minutes off the clock. Krieg converted a 3rd and 4 with a quarterback draw for 8 yards, and threw a touchdown to Steve Largent two plays later. Herrmann led another quick drive, completing 5 of 6 passes for 64 yards and a touchdown to Joiner, but the Seahawks recovered an onside kick, gained a first down and ran out the clock.

Williams had three of the Chargers' five sacks. San Diego outgained the Seahawks by 345 yards to 253, but committed five of the game's six turnovers.

==== Week 6: vs. Kansas City Chiefs ====
Week Six: Kansas City Chiefs at San Diego Chargers – Game summary

Quarter	1	2	3	4	Total
Chiefs	3	14	3	0	**20**
Chargers	0	17	0	14	**31**

at Jack Murphy Stadium, San Diego, California

- Date: October 13
- Game time: 1:00 p.m. PDT
- Game weather: 64 °F (17.8 °C), relative humidity 73%, wind 7 miles per hour (11 km/h; 6.1 kn)
- Game attendance: 50,067
- Referee: Pat Haggerty
- TV announcers (NBC): Phil Stone and Dave Rowe
- Box score

Game information

**First quarter**

- KAN – Nick Lowery 41-yard field goal, 9:32. Chiefs 3–0. **Drive: 10 plays, 57 yards, 10:19.**

**Second quarter**

- KAN – Ethan Horton 2-yard pass from Bill Kenney (Nick Lowery kick), 9:44. Chiefs 10–0. **Drive: 7 plays, 59 yards, 4:03.**
- SDG – Charlie Joiner 39-yard pass from Mark Herrmann (Bob Thomas kick), 6:46. Chiefs 10–7. **Drive: 5 plays, 62 yards, 2:58.**
- KAN – Carlos Carson 18-yard pass from Bill Kenney (Nick Lowery kick), 4:50. Chiefs 17–7. **Drive: 5 plays, 60 yards, 1:56.**
- SDG – Gary Anderson 6-yard run (Bob Thomas kick), 1:01. Chiefs 17–14. **Drive: 9 plays, 89 yards, 3:49.**
- SDG – Bob Thomas 30-yard field goal, 0:09. Tied 17–17. **Drive: 5 plays, 17 yards, 0:40.**

**Third quarter**

- KAN – Nick Lowery 34-yard field goal, 1:14. Chiefs 20–17. **Drive: 4 plays, 7 yards, 1:30.**

**Fourth quarter**

- SDG – Eric Sievers 10-yard pass from Mark Herrmann (Bob Thomas kick), 11:01. Chargers 24–20. **Drive: 9 plays, 80 yards, 5:02.**
- SDG – Tim Spencer 1-yard run (Bob Thomas kick), 6:17. Chargers 31–20. **Drive: 9 plays, 53 yards, 3:44.**

**Top passers**

- KAN – Bill Kenney – 24/36, 304 yards, 2 TD, 2 INT
- SDG – Mark Herrmann – 26/36, 320 yards, 2 TD

**Top rushers**

- KAN – Stephone Paige – 1 rush, 15 yards
- SDG – Tim Spencer – 8 rushes, 26 yards, TD

**Top receivers**

- KAN – Carlos Carson – 4 receptions, 82 yards, TD
- SDG – Charlie Joiner – 6 receptions, 118 yards, TD

Herrmann lost two fumbles in the opening seventeen minutes of the game, the latter leading to a Chiefs touchdown and 10–0 lead. On the next drive, he completed four consecutive passes for 65 yards, including the touchdown to Joiner. Kansas City quickly restored their ten-point lead, and had San Diego facing a 3rd and 10 from their own 11. Herrmann and Joiner connected for 36 yards, sparking a drive that ended with Anderson's first NFL touchdown a minute before halftime. Lowe intercepted Bill Kenney on the next play from scrimmage, allowing Thomas to tie the score at 17–17 going into halftime.

The first six possessions of the second half ended in punts. From these, the best scoring chance came when the Chiefs had a 3rd and 1 at the San Diego 26 Smith sacked Kenney for a loss of 12, also forcing a fumble that Kenney recovered at midfield. James fumbled late in the 3rd quarter, and Kansas City took the lead with a field goal. Herrmann led the Chargers to touchdowns on their next two possessions, completing 8 of 9 passes for 95 yards and a touchdown across the two drives; James had a 20-yard reception on each drive. Kansas City threatened to respond when Kenney converted a 4th and 9 with an 18-yard completion to the Charger 12, but Davis intercepted him on the next play with under four minutes on the clock, and San Diego won without further difficulty.

Kansas City went 0 for 7 on 3rd down conversion attempts in the second half. The win ended an 11-game losing streak for the Chargers against AFC West opposition.

==== Week 7: at Minnesota Vikings ====
Week Seven: San Diego Chargers at Minnesota Vikings – Game summary

Quarter	1	2	3	4	Total
Chargers	7	3	0	7	**17**
Vikings	0	7	0	14	**21**

at Hubert H. Humphrey Metrodome, Minneapolis, Minnesota

- Date: October 20
- Game time: 12:00 p.m. CDT
- Game weather: N/A (game played indoors)
- Game attendance: 61,670
- Referee: Bob McElwee
- TV announcers (NBC): Jay Randolph and Reggie Rucker
- Box score

Game information

**First quarter**

- SDG – Tim Spencer 2-yard run (Bob Thomas kick), 11:11. Chargers 7–0. **Drive: 9 plays, 67 yards, 3:49.**

**Second quarter**

- MIN – Allen Rice 1-yard run (Jan Stenerud kick), 10:51. Tied 7–7. **Drive: 5 plays, 80 yards, 2:18.**
- SDG – Bob Thomas 42-yard field goal, 0:09. Chargers 10–7. **Drive: 4 plays, 55 yards, 0:41.**

**Third quarter**

- No scoring plays

**Fourth quarter**

- MIN – Mike Mularkey 51-yard pass from Tommy Kramer (Jan Stenerud kick), 14:52. Vikings 14–10. **Drive: 5 plays, 64 yards, 1:09.**
- SDG – Tim Spencer 1-yard run (Bob Thomas kick), 6:13. Chargers 17–14. **Drive: 11 plays, 48 yards, 5:03.**
- MIN – Leo Lewis 26-yard pass from Tommy Kramer (Jan Stenerud kick), 0:19. Vikings 21–17. **Drive: 13 plays, 76 yards, 5:54.**

**Top passers**

- SDG – Mark Herrmann – 12/26, 128 yards, 2 INT
- MIN – Tommy Kramer – 31/46, 311 yards, 2 TD, 2 INT

**Top rushers**

- SDG – Tim Spencer – 14 rushes, 86 yards, 2 TD
- MIN – Darrin Nelson – 13 rushes, 41 yards

**Top receivers**

- SDG – Pete Holohan – 3 receptions, 44 yards
  SDG – Charlie Joiner – 3 receptions, 44 yards
- MIN – Mike Mularkey – 4 receptions, 91 yards, TD
  MIN – Steve Jordan – 8 receptions, 91 yards

Spencer had a 24-yard run and a 2-yard touchdown as San Diego scored on the game's opening drive. Minnesota drove inside the Charger 30 on their first two drives, but came away empty-handed after a missed field goal and a Williams interception. The Vikings did tie the score on their next possession, aided by back-to-back pass interference calls of 19 yards against Byrd (on 3rd and 6) and 24 yards against Walters in the end zone. With 50 seconds to play in the half, San Diego began a drive at their own 20. Over the next three plays, James ran for 16 yards and Herrmann had completions of 18 and 23 yards, with a roughing the passer penalty moving the ball to the Minnesota 11 with 18 seconds left. Herrmann was sacked by Joey Browner for a 14-yard loss on the next play, and San Diego settled for a field goal and a 10–7 halftime lead.

Herrmann threw an interception to Browner in the 3rd quarter, but the Vikings safety fumbled the ball straight back to the Chargers. Seven plays later, Herrmann was intercepted again, this time leading to a Tommy Kramer touchdown pass on the first play of the final quarter. Fouts then came into the game, completing two short passes before being intercepted. King intercepted Kramer three plays later, and Fouts appeared to have thrown a 45-yard touchdown pass to Chandler, only for a holding penalty on Lachey to nullify the play. Faced with a 2nd and 17 after the penalty, Fouts completed a 16-yard pass to Holohan and Spencer converted the 3rd and 1. Spencer eventually finished the drive with a touchdown on 4th and goal from the 1, aided by a strong block from Winslow. Minnesota narrowly converted a 4th and 1 from their own 33 early in their answering drive, which ended with the game-winning touchdown. Leo Lewis and Walters challenged for Kramer's 26-yard touchdown pass, which was tipped up in the air before Lewis caught it with 19 seconds to play. Fouts was able to move the Chargers to midfield, from where his last two passes fell incomplete.

Fouts, Winslow and Chandler were all coming back from injuries; Winslow had been out for a year. Lewis' winning touchdown was the only completion to a wide receiver the Charger defense allowed all day.

==== Week 8: at Los Angeles Raiders ====
Week Eight: San Diego Chargers at Los Angeles Raiders – Game summary

Quarter	1	2	3	4	Total
Chargers	0	7	7	7	**21**
Raiders	10	14	7	3	**34**

at Memorial Coliseum, Los Angeles, California

- Date: October 28
- Game time: 6:00 p.m. PST
- Game weather: 65 °F (18.3 °C), relative humidity 73%, wind 9 miles per hour (14 km/h; 7.8 kn)
- Game attendance: 69,297
- Referee: Dick Jorgensen
- TV announcers (ABC): Frank Gifford, Joe Namath and O. J. Simpson
- Box score

Game information

**First quarter**

- RAI – Chris Bahr 20-yard field goal, 8:19. Raiders 3–0. **Drive: 6 plays, 29 yards, 2:14.**
- RAI – Jessie Hester 13-yard run (Chris Bahr kick), 4:37. Raiders 10–0. **Drive: 5 plays, 36 yards, 1:44.**

**Second quarter**

- SDG – Gary Anderson 52-yard pass from Dan Fouts (Bob Thomas kick), 14:51. Raiders 10–7. **Drive: 3 plays, 73 yards, 1:26.**
- RAI – Marcus Allen 3-yard run (Chris Bahr kick), 9:12. Raiders 17–7. **Drive: 5 plays, 35 yards, 2:18.**
- RAI – Marcus Allen 1-yard run (Chris Bahr kick), 4:06. Raiders 24–7. **Drive: 5 plays, 58 yards, 1:56.**

**Third quarter**

- SDG – Gary Anderson 4-yard run (Bob Thomas kick), 11:39. Raiders 24–14. **Drive: 5 plays, 34 yards, 2:05.**
- RAI – Marcus Allen 4-yard run (Chris Bahr kick), 4:24. Raiders 31–14. **Drive: 7 plays, 56 yards, 3:31.**

**Fourth quarter**

- RAI – Chris Bahr 20-yard field goal, 12:45. Raiders 34–14. **Drive: 8 plays, 47 yards, 3:22.**
- SDG – Jesse Bendross 1-yard pass from Dan Fouts (Bob Thomas kick), 2:20. Raiders 34–21. **Drive: 7 plays, 69 yards, 1:59.**

**Top passers**

- SDG – Dan Fouts – 23/50, 315 yards, 2 TD, INT
- RAI – Marc Wilson – 15/31, 258 yards, 2 INT

**Top rushers**

- SDG – Lionel James – 4 rushes, 18 yards
- RAI – Marcus Allen – 30 rushes, 111 yards, 3 TD

**Top receivers**

- SDG – Wes Chandler – 5 receptions, 65 yards
- RAI – Todd Christensen – 7 receptions, 134 yards

On the Chargers' second drive, Fouts threw an interception on his own 32, leading to a field goal. Fouts was sacked on 3rd down on the next drive, forcing Mojsiejenko to punt from his own 7. Los Angeles took over possession at the Charger 36 after the kick, and soon scored a touchdown. Fouts sustained another 3rd-down sack on the following drive, this time at his own 8. This time, Los Angeles started at the Charger 46 after the punt, but their drive ended in a missed field goal. San Diego's offense came to life after the miss, with three Fouts completions covering 73 yards, the last 52 on the touchdown to Anderson. They were once again struggling near their goal line on their next possession, with Fouts sacked twice to leave Mojsiejenko punting from his 4. That led to a 35-yard Raiders touchdown drive. Los Angeles added another touchdown on their next possession, and led 24–7 at halftime.

Green recovered a Marcus Allen fumble at the Raider 34 early in the second half, leading to Anderson's second touchdown. Carlos Bradley intercepted Marc Wilson soon afterwards, but San Diego went three-and-out and the Raiders drove 56 yards for Allen to restore their 17-point lead. The Raiders added a field goal, and the Chargers were twice stopped on downs in Los Angeles territory before their late touchdown.

==== Week 9: vs. Denver Broncos ====
Week Nine: Denver Broncos at San Diego Chargers – Game summary

Quarter	1	2	3	4	Total
Broncos	0	3	0	7	**10**
Chargers	7	10	7	6	**30**

at Jack Murphy Stadium, San Diego, California

- Date: November 3
- Game time: 1:00 p.m. PST
- Game weather: 65 °F (18.3 °C), relative humidity 58%, wind 6 miles per hour (9.7 km/h; 5.2 kn)
- Game attendance: 57,312
- Referee: Gordon McCarter
- TV announcers (NBC): Phil Stone and Jimmy Cefalo
- Box score

Game information

**First quarter**

- SDG – Wes Chandler 19-yard pass from Dan Fouts (Bob Thomas kick), 0:04. Chargers 7–0. **Drive: 9 plays, 70 yards, 3:21.**

**Second quarter**

- SDG – Bob Thomas 36-yard field goal, 9:32. Chargers 10–0. **Drive: 10 plays, 54 yards, 4:00.**
- SDG – Wes Chandler 9-yard pass from Dan Fouts (Bob Thomas kick), 1:07. Chargers 17–0. **Drive: 6 plays, 47 yards, 2:23.**
- DEN – Rich Karlis 36-yard field goal, 0:00. Chargers 17–3. **Drive: 7 plays, 54 yards, 1:07.**

**Third quarter**

- SDG – Gary Anderson 16-yard run (Bob Thomas kick), 3:16. Chargers 24–3. **Drive: 7 plays, 80 yards, 4:09.**

**Fourth quarter**

- SDG – Bob Thomas 35-yard field goal, 13:32. Chargers 27–3. **Drive: 4 plays, -3 yards, 1:28.**
- DEN – Steve Sewell 54-yard pass from Gary Kubiak (Rich Karlis kick), 7:26. Chargers 27–10. **Drive: 4 plays, 80 yards, 1:26.**
- SDG – Bob Thomas 18-yard field goal, 1:09. Chargers 30–10. **Drive: 10 plays, 41 yards, 6:17.**

**Top passers**

- DEN – John Elway – 20/35, 222 yards, 2 INT
- SDG – Dan Fouts – 23/34, 302 yards, 2 TD, 2 INT

**Top rushers**

- DEN – John Elway – 3 rushes, 27 yards
  DEN – Sammy Winder – 9 rushes, 27 yards
- SDG – Gary Anderson – 22 rushes, 116 yards, TD

**Top receivers**

- DEN – Steve Watson – 4 receptions, 82 yards
- SDG – Wes Chandler – 6 receptions, 84 yards, 2 TD

Anderson lost a fumble in his own territory on the Chargers' first drive, but Rich Karlis missed a 38-yard field goal. Late in the opening quarter, a 19-yard catch by James on 3rd and 7 was negated by a holding penalty on Lachey, but James gained 29 yards on the resulting 3rd and 17. James later converted a 3rd and 5 with a 23-yard catch, and Chandler's first touchdown followed two plays later. Following a successful field goal by Thomas and another miss by Karlis, Fouts was intercepted, but two plays later John Elway was himself intercepted by Dale, who ran the ball back 36 yards to the Denver 47. Anderson kept the ensuing drive alive by running for 21 yards on a 3rd and 7, leading to Chandler's second touchdown. Karlis converted a field goal as time expired in the half, but San Diego still led 17–3.

Fouts was again intercepted on the first drive of the second half, and Elway led Denver to a 3rd and 8 at the Charger 13. From there, Gerald Willhite caught a 10-yard pass, but Dale forced a fumble that Davis recovered in the end zone. San Diego then drove 80 yards for a touchdown without facing a 3rd down; Anderson scored after taking an option pitch from McGee. Late in the 3rd quarter, Elway sustained back-to-back sacks for losses of 24 and 8 yards by Bradley and Robinson, then threw an interception to Smith, which set up a Thomas field goal. After Denver scored their lone touchdown of the game, Walters recovered an onside kick, and San Diego used up most of the remaining time driving to another field goal.

San Diego's defense sacked Elway four times for the loss of 45 yards. The victory pulled them within two games of Denver and Oakland at the top of the AFC West.

==== Week 10: vs. Los Angeles Raiders ====
Week Ten: Los Angeles Raiders at San Diego Chargers – Game summary

Quarter	1	2	3	4	OT	Total
Raiders	7	6	14	7	0	**34**
Chargers	7	3	10	14	6	**40**

at Jack Murphy Stadium, San Diego, California

- Date: November 10
- Game time: 1:00 p.m. PST
- Game weather: 61 °F (16.1 °C), relative humidity 56%, wind 10 miles per hour (16 km/h; 8.7 kn)
- Game attendance: 58,566
- Referee: Red Cashion
- TV announcers (NBC): Don Criqui and Bob Trumpy
- Box score

Game information

**First quarter**

- SDG – Wes Chandler 10-yard pass from Dan Fouts (Bob Thomas kick), 4:29. Chargers 7–0. **Drive: 2 plays, 16 yards, 0:43.**
- RAI – Jessie Hester 35-yard pass from Marc Wilson (Chris Bahr kick), 3:03. Tied 7–7. **Drive: 6 plays, 80 yards, 1:26.**

**Second quarter**

- SDG – Bob Thomas 34-yard field goal, 10:11. Chargers 10–7. **Drive: 7 plays, 24 yards, 3:07.**
- RAI – Frank Hawkins 1-yard run (kick blocked), 1:57. Raiders 13–10. **Drive: 4 plays, 32 yards, 1:30.**

**Third quarter**

- SDG – Bob Thomas 23-yard field goal, 11:32. Tied 13–13. **Drive: 9 plays, 61 yards, 3:28.**
- RAI – Marcus Allen 1-yard run (Chris Bahr kick), 7:11. Raiders 20–13. **Drive: 9 plays, 66 yards, 4:21.**
- SDG – Lionel James 34-yard pass from Dan Fouts (Bob Thomas kick), 3:08. Tied 20–20. **Drive: 8 plays, 80 yards, 4:03.**
- RAI – Jessie Hester 54-yard pass from Marc Wilson (Chris Bahr kick), 0:59. Raiders 27–20. **Drive: 5 plays, 75 yards, 2:09.**

**Fourth quarter**

- SDG – Gary Anderson 21-yard pass from Dan Fouts (Bob Thomas kick), 7:07. Tied 27–27. **Drive: 10 plays, 79 yards, 5:07.**
- RAI – Todd Christensen 24-yard pass from Marc Wilson (Chris Bahr kick), 1:49. Raiders 34–27 **Drive: 12 plays, 84 yards, 5:18.**
- SDG – Charlie Joiner 14-yard pass from Dan Fouts (Bob Thomas kick), 0:53. Tied 34–34. **Drive: 5 plays, 71 yards, 0:56.**

**Overtime**

- SDG – Lionel James 17-yard run, 11:16. Chargers 40–34. **Drive: 7 plays, 80 yards, 3:44.**

**Top passers**

- RAI – Marc Wilson – 18/32, 297 yards, 3 TD, 2 INT
- SDG – Dan Fouts – 26/41, 436 yards, 4 TD, INT

**Top rushers**

- RAI – Marcus Allen – 28 rushes, 119 yards, TD
- SDG – Gary Anderson – 16 rushes, 70 yards

**Top receivers**

- RAI – Todd Christensen – 7 receptions, 112 yards, TD
- SDG – Lionel James – 11 receptions, 168 yards, TD

Los Angeles began the game with a six-minute drive that reached the Charger 25 before Walters intercepted Wilson in the end zone. San Diego also drove into opposition territory, but came up empty-handed when Thomas missed a 35-yard field goal. Williams recovered an Allen fumble inside the 20 on the next play, setting up Chandler's touchdown two plays later. The Raiders responded with Wilson's first touchdown pass to Jessie Hester. Wilson was intercepted again early in the 2nd quarter, with Bradley returning the ball 18 yards to the Los Angeles 41; that led to a successful field goal. San Diego later gained a first down at midfield, but Fouts' next pass was tipped and intercepted, leading to another Raider touchdown, though Smith blocked the extra point. Thomas missed a 30-yard kick as time expired in the half, leaving Los Angeles 13–10 ahead.

A 39-yard reception by James helped the Chargers reach a 2nd and goal from the 1, but McGee was stopped for no gain and Anderson recovered his own fumble for a loss of 4. Thomas tied the score with a 23-yard kick. Six of the game's next eight drives ended in touchdowns, beginning with Allen's 1-yard run for the Raiders. On the next drive, Spencer's 29-yard reception was followed by an apparent 24-yard touchdown for Winslow, nullified when he was flagged for offensive pass interference. The Chargers scored anyway two plays later, James taking a short pass 34 yards for the touchdown. Wilson restored the Raiders' lead at 27–20 with another long touchdown pass to Hester. After a Charger three-and-out, the Raiders missed a chance to extend their lead when Chris Bahr was wide left on a 38-yard field goal. San Diego then converted three 3rd downs, the last of these being a 21-yard touchdown catch-and-run for Anderson. Los Angeles came straight back with another touchdown drive, taking their last lead with under two minutes to play. Anderson took a short pass over the middle on the next play from scrimmage, eluding several defenders before being tackled for a gain of 38 yards. James followed up with a 14-yard run, and Joiner tied the game at 34–34 soon afterwards. Los Angeles let the clock run out after three more plays left them facing a 3rd and 7 at their own 33.

San Diego won the overtime coin toss and received. They didn't need to face a 3rd down on their winning drive, which featured 23-yard gains by Holohan and Anderson. On a 1st and 10 from the 17, James wove through would-be tacklers near the line of scrimmage and broke clear for the winning touchdown.

James had 51 yards rushing, 168 receiving and 126 on kickoff returns, setting a franchise record with 345 all-purpose yards, the second-most in NFL history up to that point. Anderson added 70 rushing yards and 84 receiving yards. The two teams combined for over 1,000 offensive yards, with San Diego outgaining Los Angeles 593–454.

==== Week 11: at Denver Broncos ====
Week Eleven: San Diego Chargers at Denver Broncos – Game summary

Quarter	1	2	3	4	OT	Total
Chargers	7	7	0	10	0	**24**
Broncos	7	0	0	17	6	**30**

at Mile High Stadium, Denver, Colorado

- Date: November 17
- Game time: 2:00 p.m. MST
- Game weather: 32 °F (0.0 °C), relative humidity 66%, wind 7 miles per hour (11 km/h; 6.1 kn), wind chill 25 °F (−3.9 °C)
- Game attendance: 74,376
- Referee: Fred Silva
- TV announcers (NBC): Phil Stone and Sam Rutigliano
- Box score

Game information

**First quarter**

- SDG – Gary Anderson 98-yard kickoff return (Bob Thomas kick), 14:43. Chargers 7–0. **Drive: 0 plays, 98 yards, 0:17.**
- DEN – Steve Watson 4-yard pass from John Elway (Rich Karlis kick), 3:10. Tied 7–7. **Drive: 6 plays, 44 yards, 3:25.**

**Second quarter**

- SDG – Lionel James 6-yard pass from Dan Fouts (Bob Thomas kick), 13:36. Chargers 14–7. **Drive: 3 plays, 12 yards, 0:38.**

**Third quarter**

- No scoring plays

**Fourth quarter**

- DEN – Gene Lang 2-yard run (Rich Karlis kick), 14:07. Tied 14–14. **Drive: 4 plays, 14 yards, 1:35.**
- DEN – Gene Lang 4-yard run (Rich Karlis kick), 13:45. Broncos 21–14. **Drive: 3 plays, 19 yards, 0:13.**
- SDG – Bob Thomas 36-yard field goal, 10:09. Broncos 21–17. **Drive: 9 plays, 61 yards, 3:36.**
- SDG – Tim Spencer 2-yard run (Bob Thomas kick), 1:18. Chargers 24–21. **Drive: 4 plays, 24 yards, 1:09.**
- DEN – Rich Karlis 34-yard field goal, 0:05. Tied 24–24. **Drive: 7 plays, 48 yards, 1:13.**

**Overtime**

- DEN – Louis Wright 60-yard blocked field goal return, 10:15. Broncos 30–24.

**Top passers**

- SDG – Dan Fouts – 23/45, 245 yards, TD, 2 INT
- DEN – John Elway – 28/50, 261 yards, TD, 2 INT

**Top rushers**

- SDG – Lionel James – 15 rushes, 64 yards
- DEN – Gene Lang – 15 rushes, 51 yards, 2 TD

**Top receivers**

- SDG – Lionel James – 11 receptions, 93 yards, TD
- DEN – Vance Johnson – 4 receptions, 48 yards

San Diego had the opportunity to close to within one game of Denver and Los Angeles at the top of the AFC West. Anderson immediately put them ahead, taking the opening kickoff at his own 2 and exploiting a large hole in the centre of Denver's kick coverage to score easily. The Chargers reached Denver's 30 on their next drive, but Thomas' field goal try was blocked. Later, Louis Wright intercepted a Fouts pass, setting up the first Denver touchdown. San Diego again drove into Broncos territory, reaching 3rd and 8 at the 31 before Fouts was intercepted again. Miles McPherson intercepted Elway three plays later, returning the ball 30 yards to the 12-yard line. On 3rd and 4 from the 6, James took Fouts' pass in the backfield and dove into the left corner of the end zone. Thomas hit the right upright on a 41-yard kick later in the half, leaving the Chargers 14–7 up at the break.

Denver missed a kick of their own in the 3rd quarter, Karlis sending the ball wide right from 28 yards out at the end of a 15-play drive. Anderson and Fouts then both lost fumbles in quick succession, leading to a pair of Gene Lang touchdowns only 22 seconds apart and a 21–14 lead. James gained 40 of the Chargers' 61 yards on the next drive, and Thomas had his lone successful field goal try of the day. Denver threatened to extend their lead, but Lowe intercepted Elway at the Charger 18. The teams then traded punts, with Denver's kick being blocked by Davis with 2:27 to play; San Diego had to drive only 24 yards for Spencer's go-ahead touchdown run. They had left over a minute on the clock, and Elway completed five straight passes for 43 yards and ran for another 5, positioning Karlis for the game-tying field goal.

San Diego won the overtime coin toss and received the ball, which Anderson returned to his own 32. James swept left for 16 yards, and Spencer narrowly converted a 4th and inches at the Denver 43. Fouts followed up with a 13-yard pass to Chandler, and San Diego reached a 4th and 4 at the Denver 23. Thomas' attempted 40-yard game-winner was blocked and picked up by Wright, who began to return the ball. However, the play was whistled dead as Denver, attempting to ice the kicker, had called timeout immediately before the snap. When the kick was retaken it was blocked again and recovered by Wright again; this time, he was allowed to return the ball for the game-winning touchdown.

==== Week 12: at Houston Oilers ====
Week Twelve: San Diego Chargers at Houston Oilers – Game summary

Quarter	1	2	3	4	Total
Chargers	0	7	14	14	**35**
Oilers	14	3	3	17	**37**

at Astrodome, Houston, Texas

- Date: November 24
- Game time: 12:00 p.m. CST
- Game weather: N/A (game played indoors)
- Game attendance: 34,336
- Referee: Ben Dreith
- TV announcers (NBC): Don Criqui and Bob Trumpy
- Box score

Game information

**First quarter**

- HOU – Larry Moriarty 16-yard run (Tony Zendejas kick), 11:29. Oilers 7–0. **Drive: 3 plays, 18 yards, 0:42.**
- HOU – Drew Hill 8-yard pass from Oliver Luck (Tony Zendejas kick), 0:30. Oilers 14–0. **Drive: 12 plays, 70 yards, 5:33.**

**Second quarter**

- HOU – Tony Zendejas 46-yard field goal, 8:42. Oilers 17–0. **Drive: 5 plays, 32 yards, 1:47.**
- SDG – Tim Spencer 1-yard run (Bob Thomas kick), 1:47. Oilers 17–7. **Drive: 3 plays, 11 yards, 0:31.**

**Third quarter**

- SDG – Lionel James 67-yard pass from Dan Fouts (Bob Thomas kick), 12:38. Oilers 17–14. **Drive: 4 plays, 91 yards, 2:22.**
- HOU – Tony Zendejas 52-yard field goal, 8:48. Oilers 20–14. **Drive: 9 plays, 46 yards, 3:50.**
- SDG – Buford McGee 2-yard run (Bob Thomas kick), 2:25. Chargers 21–20. **Drive: 12 plays, 80 yards, 6:23.**

**Fourth quarter**

- HOU – Mike Rozier 3-yard run (Tony Zendejas kick), 11:48. Oilers 27–21. **Drive: 12 plays, 81 yards, 5:36.**
- SDG – Tim Spencer 15-yard run (Bob Thomas kick), 7:20. Chargers 28–27. **Drive: 10 plays, 78 yards, 4:29.**
- HOU – Mike Rozier 2-yard run (Tony Zendejas kick), 1:32. Oilers 34–28. **Drive: 6 plays, 42 yards, 1:28.**
- SDG – Wes Chandler 11-yard pass from Dan Fouts (Bob Thomas kick), 0:39. Chargers 35–34. **Drive: 5 plays, 80 yards, 0:53.**
- HOU – Tony Zendejas 51-yard field goal, 0:02. Oilers 37–35. **Drive: 5 plays, 45 yards, 0:37.**

**Top passers**

- SDG – Dan Fouts – 24/36, 343 yards, 2 TD, 2 INT
- HOU – Oliver Luck – 24/42, 286 yards, TD, INT

**Top rushers**

- SDG – Lionel James – 9 rushes, 69 yards
- HOU – Larry Moriarty – 10 rushes, 50 yards, TD

**Top receivers**

- SDG – Kellen Winslow – 7 receptions, 107 yards
- HOU – Drew Hill – 4 receptions, 84 yards, TD

Houston's first touchdown came shortly after James lost a fumble inside his own 20. San Diego gained a first down at the Houston 15 on the following drive, but Sievers, Gary Kowalski and Winslow each committed penalties and Thomas was short on a 47-yard field goal; the Oilers drove 70 yards the other way and doubled their lead late in the opening quarter. Fouts was intercepted on the next two Charger drives, with Houston converting the latter takeaway into a field goal. Chandler and Fouts then lost fumbles in Houston territory, giving San Diego a run of four consecutive drives ending in turnovers. However, their defense won the ball twice; King forced a fumble that Smith recovered, and Hendy intercepted an Oliver Luck pass, setting up Spencer's first touchdown, which cut the halftime deficit to 17–7.

Four plays into the second half, James caught a deep ball in double coverage near the right sideline and dodged a weak tackle before completing a 67-yard touchdown. After a Houston field goal, San Diego took their first lead of the game. Chandler caught a 26-yard pass on 3rd and 15, Spencer ran for 4 on a 4th and 1 from midfield, and McGee scored on 3rd and 1 from the 2. After Houston came straight back with a touchdown, Joiner's 9-yard catch on 4th and 3 helped set up Spencer's second touchdown, which came on 3rd and 8 from the 15; excluding a 1-play drive that ended the first half, it was the Chargers' fourth consecutive touchdown drive, and put them up 28–27. Both teams punted once, then Luck's 30-yard completion set up Mike Rozier's second touchdown run with 1:32 to play. Starting from his own 20, Fouts followed a 25-yard completion to Joiner with a deep pass to Trumaine Johnson, who drew a 42-yard pass interference penalty. Three plays gained two yards, then Fouts found Chandler in the middle of the end zone on 4th and 8, putting San Diego on top again with 39 seconds left. Luck was faced with a 4th and 15 from his own 42 with 13 seconds left, from where his 25-yard pass allowed Tony Zendejas to kick the winning field goal with 2 seconds left.

The game featured over 800 yards of offense (439 for San Diego, 415 for Houston), and over 200 yards of penalties (82 conceded by San Diego, 137 by Houston). James had 69 rushing yards and 99 receiving yards.

==== Week 13: vs. Buffalo Bills ====
Week Thirteen: Buffalo Bills at San Diego Chargers – Game summary

Quarter	1	2	3	4	Total
Bills	0	7	0	0	**7**
Chargers	7	17	10	6	**40**

at Jack Murphy Stadium, San Diego, California

- Date: December 1
- Game time: 1:00 p.m. PST
- Game weather: 55 °F (12.8 °C), relative humidity 73%, wind 6 miles per hour (9.7 km/h; 5.2 kn)
- Game attendance: 45,487
- Referee: Fred Wyant
- TV announcers (NBC): Fred Roggin and Dave Rowe
- Box score

Game information

**First quarter**

- SDG – Charlie Joiner 38-yard pass from Dan Fouts (Bob Thomas kick), 1:46. Chargers 7–0. **Drive: 3 plays, 61 yards, 0:57.**

**Second quarter**

- SDG – Bob Thomas 24-yard field goal, 13:56. Chargers 10–0. **Drive: 4 plays, 4 yards, 0:54.**
- SDG – John Hendy 75-yard interception return (Bob Thomas kick), 8:37. Chargers 17–0.
- SDG – Tim Spencer 1-yard run (Bob Thomas kick), 1:57. Chargers 24–0. **Drive: 10 plays, 59 yards, 4:28.**
- BUF – Joe Cribbs 2-yard run (Scott Norwood kick), 0:42. Chargers 24–7. **Drive: 6 plays, 87 yards, 1:15.**

**Third quarter**

- SDG – Bob Thomas 28-yard field goal, 8:36. Chargers 27–7. **Drive: 13 plays, 67 yards, 6:24.**
- SDG – Eric Sievers 23-yard pass from Dan Fouts (Bob Thomas kick), 1:04. Chargers 34–7. **Drive: 5 plays, 58 yards, 2:48.**

**Fourth quarter**

- SDG – Pete Holohan 13-yard pass from Dan Fouts (kick failed, wide left), 1:01. Chargers 40–7. **Drive: 6 plays, 29 yards, 3:40.**

**Top passers**

- BUF – Bruce Mathison – 18/36, 271 yards, 4 INT
- SDG – Dan Fouts – 21/36, 256 yards, 3 TD, 2 INT

**Top rushers**

- BUF – Joe Cribbs – 14 rushes, 57 yards, TD
- SDG – Tim Spencer – 12 rushes, 47 yards, TD

**Top receivers**

- BUF – Andre Reed – 6 receptions, 103 yards
- SDG – Pete Holohan – 7 receptions, 70 yards, TD

Green recovered a fumble three plays into the game, though his offense fumbled three times themselves on the ensuing drive, McGee eventually losing the ball after the Chargers had reached 1st and goal from the 8. After an exchange of punts, the Bills reached a 2nd and 17 from the Charger 22, whereupon Byrd intercepted Bruce Mathison and returned the ball 25 yards to the 39. After an incompletion, Anderson went around right end for 23 yards and Fouts followed up with a 39-yard touchdown to Joiner. Hendy's interception and 22-yard return on the first play of the 2nd quarter set up San Diego on the Buffalo 11, though they had to settle for a field goal. Later in the quarter, Fouts was intercepted, and Buffalo reached a 1st and 10 at the Charger 33. Hendy then cut in front of a Mathison pass near the sideline, intercepted it and returned the ball 75 yards for a touchdown. A pair of 3rd-down conversion catches by Holohan set up Spencer's short touchdown run. While Buffalo pulled back to within 24–7 at the break, they progressed no further than the San Diego 29 in the second half, while the Chargers pulled away with sixteen further points from their first three drives.

Despite the one-sided scoreline, the Chargers only outgained Buffalo by 18 yards (365–347). They were aided by five defensive takeaways (Buffalo had three).

==== Week 14: vs. Pittsburgh Steelers ====
Week Fourteen: Pittsburgh Steelers at San Diego Chargers – Game summary

Quarter	1	2	3	4	Total
Steelers	7	13	14	10	**44**
Chargers	21	13	7	13	**54**

at Jack Murphy Stadium, San Diego, California

- Date: December 8
- Game time: 6:00 p.m. PST
- Game weather: 70 °F (21.1 °C), 56 degrees, relative humidity 85%, wind 7 miles per hour (11 km/h; 6.1 kn)
- Game attendance: 52,098
- Referee: Jerry Seeman
- TV announcers (ABC): Frank Gifford, Joe Namath and O. J. Simpson
- Box score

Game information

**First quarter**

- SDG – Tim Spencer 12-yard run (Bob Thomas kick), 12:21. Chargers 7–0. **Drive: 2 plays, 28 yards, 0:55.**
- PIT – Walter Abercrombie 15-yard pass from David Woodley (Gary Anderson kick), 6:46. Tied 7–7. **Drive: 10 plays, 79 yards, 5:35.**
- SDG – Wes Chandler 36-yard pass from Dan Fouts (Bob Thomas kick), 2:45. Chargers 14–7. **Drive: 7 plays, 77 yards, 4:01.**
- SDG – Pete Holohan 20-yard pass from Dan Fouts (Bob Thomas kick), 1:35. Chargers 21–7. **Drive: 3 plays, 24 yards, 1:09.**

**Second quarter**

- PIT – Louis Lipps 8-yard pass from David Woodley (Gary Anderson kick), 8:47. Chargers 21–14. **Drive: 5 plays, 38 yards, 1:35.**
- PIT – Gary Anderson 45-yard field goal, 4:45. Chargers 21–17. **Drive: 7 plays, 22 yards, 2:47.**
- SDG – Wes Chandler 75-yard pass from Dan Fouts (Bob Thomas kick), 3:07. Chargers 28–17. **Drive: 4 plays, 95 yards, 1:38.**
- SDG – Buford McGee 3-yard run (kick aborted), 1:56. Chargers 34–17. **Drive: 3 plays, 22 yards, 0:56.**
- PIT – Gary Anderson 41-yard field goal, 0:36. Chargers 34–20. **Drive: 8 plays, 56 yards, 1:20.**

**Third quarter**

- PIT – David Woodley 1-yard run (Gary Anderson kick), 9:38. Chargers 34–27. **Drive: 9 plays, 40 yards, 5:03.**
- PIT – Walter Abercrombie 25-yard pass from David Woodley (Gary Anderson kick), 4:29. Tied 34–34. **Drive: 7 plays, 55 yards, 3:42.**
- SDG – Buford McGee 7-yard run (Bob Thomas kick), 1:00. Chargers 41–34. **Drive: 9 plays, 90 yards, 3:29.**

**Fourth quarter**

- PIT – Louis Lipps 15-yard run (Gary Anderson kick), 12:00. Tied 41–41. **Drive: 6 plays, 68 yards, 4:00.**
- PIT – Gary Anderson 26-yard field goal, 6:37. Steelers 44–41. **Drive: 11 plays, 47 yards, 4:26.**
- SDG – Gary Anderson 2-yard run (kick aborted), 2:33. Chargers 47–44. **Drive: 9 plays, 75 yards, 4:04.**
- SDG – Jeffery Dale 47-yard interception return (Bob Thomas kick), 2:09. Chargers 54–44.

**Top passers**

- PIT – David Woodley – 24/35, 287 yards, 3 TD, 2 INT
- SDG – Dan Fouts – 21/33, 372 yards, 3 TD, 3 INT

**Top rushers**

- PIT – Walter Abercrombie – 20 rushes, 73 yards
- SDG – Tim Spencer – 10 rushes, 42 yards, TD

**Top receivers**

- PIT – Frank Pollard – 7 receptions, 87 yards
- SDG – Wes Chandler – 5 receptions, 154 yards, 2 TD

Pittsburgh opened the game with a three-and-out. Derrie Nelson partially blocked their punt, which went only 14 yards, leading to Spencer's touchdown two plays later. After the Steelers tied the score, Fouts connected with Joiner for 24 yards and followed up by finding Chandler behind the defense for a 36-yard touchdown. On the next play from scrimmage, Byrd forced a fumble that Smith recovered at the Steeler 24, and Fouts connected with Holohan in the end zone on 3rd and 6 from the 20. With three touchdowns in three possessions, the Chargers led 21–7 after a quarter. Fouts was intercepted on the next Charger drive, and Pittsburgh fought back with David Woodley's second touchdown pass of the game; they added a field goal on their next drive to pull within four points. Chandler's second touchdown came when Fouts took advantage of a breakdown in coverage, finding the receiver alone up the left sideline for an easy score. King knocked the ball from Woodley's grasp on the next play from scrimmage and Earl Wilson recovered to set up McGee's first touchdown. The Steelers responded with a field goal but trailed 34–20 at halftime.

Fouts was intercepted on the first play of the second half, and San Diego went three-and-out on their following possession; Pittsburgh answered with two touchdowns to tie the game. Fouts kept the Chargers' response going with 3rd-down conversion passes to James and Joiner, then Dwayne Woodruff missed an interception of a deep pass that Anderson caught for a gain of 40. McGee kept the ball on an option for his 7-yard touchdown run, and the Chargers led 41–34 through three quarters. Louis Lipps scored easily on a reverse to tie the game again, then the Steelers turned Fouts' third interception into a field goal to lead for the first time. Fouts had completions on six consecutive plays no what would prove the winning drive, the longest a 37-yarder to Joiner. The Chargers reached 3rd and goal at the 2, from where they again ran the option; this time, McGee pitched to Anderson for the touchdown. There were still over two minutes to play, but Woodley was intercepted by Dale on the next play; Dale wove through would-be tacklers to score on a 47-yard return. San Diego almost reached 60 points after Hendy claimed another interception, but Spencer was stopped just short of the goal line on the game's final play.

The Chargers had two 100-yard receivers (Chandler with 5 catches for 154 yards and 2 touchdowns, Joiner with 6 catches for 110 yards). They tied a club record set in 1981 by scoring eight total touchdowns. The 98 total points was tied for fourth-most in an NFL game at that point.

==== Week 15: vs. Philadelphia Eagles ====
Week Fifteen: Philadelphia Eagles at San Diego Chargers – Game summary

Quarter	1	2	3	4	Total
Eagles	7	0	7	0	**14**
Chargers	0	3	14	3	**20**

at Jack Murphy Stadium, San Diego, California

- Date: December 15
- Game time: 1:00 p.m. PST
- Game weather: 55 °F (12.8 °C), relative humidity 51%, wind 7 miles per hour (11 km/h; 6.1 kn)
- Game attendance: 45,569
- Referee: Jerry Markbreit
- TV announcers (CBS): Tom Brookshier and Dan Jiggetts
- Box score

Game information

**First quarter**

- PHI – John Spagnola 3-yard pass from Ron Jaworski (Paul McFadden kick), 7:54. Eagles 7–0. **Drive: 13 plays, 81 yards, 7:06.**

**Second quarter**

- SDG – Bob Thomas 45-yard field goal, 12:34. Eagles 7–3. **Drive: 7 plays, 13 yards, 2:15.**

**Third quarter**

- SDG – Tim Spencer 6-yard run (Bob Thomas kick), 11:50. Chargers 10–7 **Drive: 6 plays, 69 yards, 3:10.**
- PHI – Dave Little offensive fumble recovery in end zone (Paul McFadden kick), 10:07. Eagles 14–10. **Drive: 3 plays, 46 yards, 1:43.**
- SDG – Charlie Joiner 23-yard pass from Mark Herrmann (Bob Thomas kick), 7:06. Chargers 17–14. **Drive: 7 plays, 74 yards, 3:02.**

**Fourth quarter**

- SDG – Bob Thomas 46-yard field goal, 5:16. Chargers 20–14. **Drive: 8 plays, 37 yards, 3:54.**

**Top passers**

- PHI – Ron Jaworski – 29/48, 334 yards, TD, 3 INT
- SDG – Dan Fouts – 11/22, 221 yards, INT

**Top rushers**

- PHI – Earnest Jackson – 11 rushes, 64 yards
- SDG – Tim Spencer – 16 rushes, 57 yards, TD

**Top receivers**

- PHI – Mike Quick – 7 receptions, 92 yards
- SDG – Wes Chandler – 5 receptions, 124 yards

Philadelphia converted three 3rd downs on the opening drive, ending with Ron Jaworski's touchdown pass. Green intercepted Jaworski on the opening play of the 2nd quarter, leading to Thomas' first field goal. On their next drive, San Diego faced a 3rd and 15 on their own 21, but Fouts found Anderson 45 yards downfield to convert. James caught a 28-yard pass to move the ball to the 11, but was then off-target on an option pitch to Anderson, resulting in a loose ball that the Eagles recovered. San Diego were in Philadelphia territory on their next three drives as well, reaching the 39, 33 and 26 yard lines respectively. The drives ended with a punt and two Fouts turnovers, leaving the Chargers 7–3 behind at halftime.

On the fourth play of the second half, Fouts picked up a fractured fibula while completing a 46-yard pass to Chandler. Herrmann came into the game with the ball at the Eagles' 11, and handed off twice to Spencer, the latter for a touchdown. Philadelphia returned the kickoff 51 yards and retook the lead only three plays later. Herrmann responded with completions of 16, 20 and 23 yards, the last one a quick slant that Joiner took in for the touchdown. The Eagles missed a chance to tie the score in the final quarter when Paul McFadden was short from 52 yards. Chandler's 22-yard catch moved the Chargers into Philadelphia territory, and Thomas doubled their lead with a success from 46 yards out. Starting with five minutes to play, the Eagles reached a 3rd and 20 at the Charger 49. Walters then intercepted Jaworski, and Spencer and Anderson both picked up first downs as San Diego ran the final three minutes off the clock.

The game was statistically even: the teams had 22 first downs each and three turnovers each, while San Diego had a small advantage in yardage at 417–382.

==== Week 16: at Kansas City Chiefs ====
Week Sixteen: San Diego Chargers at Kansas City Chiefs – Game summary

Quarter	1	2	3	4	Total
Chargers	3	3	7	21	**34**
Chiefs	7	28	3	0	**38**

at Arrowhead Stadium, Kansas City, Missouri

- Date: December 22
- Game time: 12:00 p.m. CST
- Game weather: 35 °F (1.7 °C), relative humidity 77%, wind 17 miles per hour (27 km/h; 15 kn), wind chill 25 °F (−3.9 °C)
- Game attendance: 18,178
- Referee: Tom Dooley
- TV announcers (NBC): Charlie Jones and Jimmy Cefalo
- Box score

Game information

**First quarter**

- KAN – Stephone Paige 56-yard pass from Todd Blackledge (Nick Lowery kick), 10:08. Chiefs 7–0. **Drive: 1 play, 56 yards, 0:09.**
- SDG – Bob Thomas 24-yard field goal, 4:19. Chiefs 7–3. **Drive: 12 plays, 54 yards, 5:39.**

**Second quarter**

- KAN – Herman Heard 7-yard run (Nick Lowery kick), 14:56. Chiefs 14–3. **Drive: 8 plays, 71 yards, 4:17.**
- KAN – Mike Pruitt 1-yard run (Nick Lowery kick), 11:41. Chiefs 21–3. **Drive: 4 plays, 54 yards, 1:05.**
- KAN – Stephone Paige 84-yard pass from Bill Kenney (Nick Lowery kick), 2:25. Chiefs 28–3. **Drive: 3 plays, 82 yards, 1:52.**
- KAN – Jonathan Hayes 6-yard pass from Bill Kenney (Nick Lowery kick), 1:26. Chiefs 35–3. **Drive: 2 plays, 26 yards, 0:11.**
- SDG – Bob Thomas 26-yard field goal, 0:00. Chiefs 35–6. **Drive: 10 plays, 63 yards, 1:21.**

**Third quarter**

- SDG – Wes Chandler 5-yard pass from Mark Herrmann (Bob Thomas kick), 8:19. Chiefs 35–13. **Drive: 3 plays, 7 yards, 1:28.**
- KAN – Nick Lowery 34-yard field goal, 4:09. Chiefs 38–13. **Drive: 10 plays, 60 yards, 4:02.**

**Fourth quarter**

- SDG – Tim Spencer 2-yard run (Bob Thomas kick), 9:42. Chiefs 38–20. **Drive: 13 plays, 88 yards, 4:36.**
- SDG – Lionel James 8-yard pass from Mark Herrmann (Bob Thomas kick), 5:44. Chiefs 38–27. **Drive: 10 plays, 55 yards, 3:47.**
- SDG – Trumaine Johnson 20-yard pass from Mark Herrmann (Bob Thomas kick), 2:48. Chiefs 38–34. **Drive: 10 plays, 80 yards, 1:38.**

**Top passers**

- SDG – Mark Herrmann – 37/58, 362 yards, 3 TD, 3 INT
- KAN – Bill Kenney – 9/16, 200 yards, 2 TD

**Top rushers**

- SDG – Gary Anderson – 12 rushes, 72 yards
- KAN – Herman Heard – 10 rushes, 47 yards, TD

**Top receivers**

- SDG – Gary Anderson – 9 receptions, 91 yards
- KAN – Stephone Paige – 8 receptions, 309 yards, 2 TD

One play after an exchange of punts, Stephone Paige beat the Charger defense on a 56-yard touchdown. Herrmann, starting due to Fouts' cracked tibia, led a field goal drive in response. Kansas City scored four unanswered touchdowns over their next five drives, with Paige contributing a long catch in each drive; he had gains of 51, 30, 84 (for a touchdown) and 20 yards. Herrmann was intercepted twice as Kansas City pulled away. He passed on 9 straight plays after the fifth Chiefs touchdown, completing 6 of them and positioning Thomas for a field goal that made the score 35–6 at halftime.

Thomas missed from 32 yards early in the second half, but Vince Osby ran a fumble back 46 yards to the Chiefs 7 and Chandler scored three plays later. A 39-yard catch by Paige set up a Kansas City field goal and after Herrmann threw his third interception the Chiefs led 38–13 through three quarters. Herrmann completed 6 of 7 passes for 60 yards while guiding the Chargers to a 3rd and goal at the 1, but had to temporarily leave the game after taking a hard hit. Fouts came in for one play and handed off to Spencer, who appeared to have been stopped but bounced to the left for the touchdown. After Mike Guendling recovered an onside kick, Herrmann returned to the game. The ensuing drive was prolonged by a roughing the passer penalty when Herrmann threw incomplete on a 4th and 12, and James scored three plays later. Kansas City recovered an onside kick and ran the clock down inside five minutes before punting. Herrmann converted a 4th and 5 with a 12-yard pass to Holohan, and found Trumaine Johnson two plays later for the game's final touchdown. The Chiefs recovered another onside kick, converted a 3rd and 5, and ran out the clock.

Herrmann's 58 pass attempts set a new Charger record, while his 37 completions tied Fouts for another franchise record. (Note: Philip Rivers broke both these records in 2015.) Paige set a new NFL record with 309 receiving yards; (Note: Flipper Anderson broke this record in 1989.) the Chargers had previously only allowed one 200-yard receiver in their history. San Diego would have set an NFL record had they completed their comeback from a 35–3 deficit; the Buffalo Bills became the first team to overcome such a deficit in the 1992 playoffs.

== Standings ==
AFC West
	W	L	T	PCT	DIV	CONF	PF	PA	STK
^{(1)} Los Angeles Raiders	12	4	0	.750	5–3	9–3	354	308	W6
Denver Broncos	11	5	0	.688	5–3	8–4	380	329	W2
Seattle Seahawks	8	8	0	.500	4–4	6–6	349	303	L2
San Diego Chargers	8	8	0	.500	3–5	7–7	467	435	L1
Kansas City Chiefs	6	10	0	.375	3–5	4–8	317	360	W1

== Awards ==
Fouts and Chandler were the only Chargers named to the AFC Pro Bowl squad, both qualifying as backups; Fouts was also voted second team All-Pro by the Associated Press.
