= 1986 San Diego Chargers season =

NFL team season

- Owner: Alex Spanos
- General manager: Johnny Sanders
- Head coach: Don Coryell (fired October 29, 1-7 record); Al Saunders (interim, 3-5 record)
- Home stadium: Jack Murphy Stadium

Results
- Record: 4–12
- Division place: 5th AFC West
- Playoffs: Did not qualify
- All-Pros: None
- Pro Bowlers: 1: RB Gary Anderson

The 1986 San Diego Chargers season was the franchise's 17th season in the National Football League (NFL), and its 27th overall. the team failed to improve on their 8–8 record from 1985. Following a stagnant 1–7 start, Head Coach Don Coryell was fired and Al Saunders was named interim Head Coach. After the season, Saunders was named the permanent Head Coach and would hold the position through the end of the 1988 season. Leslie O'Neal was named Defensive Rookie of the Year.

== NFL draft ==
1986 San Diego Chargers draft
Round	Pick	Player	Position	College	Notes
1	8	Leslie O'Neal *	DE	Oklahoma State	
1	13	James FitzPatrick	OT	USC	
3	66	Terry Unrein	DE	Colorado State	
3	70	Jeff Walker	T	Memphis State	
4	95	Ty Allert	LB	Texas	
4	97	Tommy Taylor	LB	UCLA	
5	118	Doug Landry	LB	Louisiana Tech	
5	129	Donald Brown	DB	Maryland	
5	133	Matt Johnson	DB	USC	
6	155	Curt Pardridge	WR	Northern Illinois	
7	182	Fred Smalls	LB	West Virginia	
8	209	Mike Perrino	T	Notre Dame	
9	235	Mike Zordich	DB	Penn State	
11	293	Chuck Sanders	RB	Slippery Rock	
11	298	Drew Smetana	T	Oregon	
12	320	Jeff Sprowls	DB	Brigham Young	
12	333	Mike Travis	DB	Georgia Tech	
Made roster * Made at least one Pro Bowl during career

== Roster ==
1986 San Diego Chargers roster
Quarterbacks (QB): 12 Tom Flick; 14 Dan Fouts; 9 Mark Herrmann; Running backs (RB): 42 Curtis Adams; 40 Gary Anderson; 43 Tim Spencer; Wide receivers (WR): 89 Wes Chandler; 83 Trumaine Johnson; 18 Charlie Joiner; 81 Timmie Ware; Tight ends (TE): 88 Pete Holohan; 80 Kellen Winslow	Offensive linemen (OL): 77 Sam Claphan G; 61 Ken Dallafior T/G; 75 Curt DiGiacomo G; 68 Gary Kowalski T; 74 Jim Lachey T; 63 Jim Leonard G/C; 62 Don Macek C; 60 Dennis McKnight G; 72 Jeff Walker T/G; Defensive linemen (DL): 92 Dee Hardison DE; 90 Mack Moore DE; 98 Terry Unrein NT; 99 Lee Williams DE; 93 Earl Wilson DE; 96 Blaise Winter NT	Linebackers (LB): 56 Ty Allert ILB; 57 Thomas Benson ILB; 59 Andy Hawkins OLB; 51 Woodrow Lowe OLB; 55 Derrie Nelson ILB; 50 Gary Plummer ILB; 54 Billy Ray Smith OLB; 52 Angelo Snipes OLB; Defensive backs (DB): 22 Gill Byrd FS/CB; 37 Jeffery Dale SS; 20 Wayne Davis CB; 25 Vencie Glenn FS; 27 Daniel Hunter CB; 33 John Sullivan SS; 24 Ken Taylor CB; 30 Kevin Wyatt CB; Special teams (ST): 2 Ralf Mojsiejenko P; 6 Rolf Benirschke K	Reserve: 78 Chuck Ehin NT (IR); 52 Mark Fellows LB (IR); 70 James FitzPatrick T (IR); 29 John Hendy S (IR); 26 Lionel James RB (IR); 21 Buford McGee RB (IR); 87 Malcolm Moore TE (IR); 91 Leslie O'Neal DE (IR); 85 Eric Sievers TE (IR); 97 Tony Simmons DE (IR); 23 Danny Walters CB (IR); Rookies in italics

== Preseason ==
Week	Date	Opponent	Result	Record	Venue	Attendance
1	August 9	Dallas Cowboys	W 20–0	1–0	Jack Murphy Stadium	
2	August 16	Philadelphia Eagles	W 45–38	2–0	Jack Murphy Stadium	
3	August 23	at Los Angeles Rams	L 17–20	2–1	Anaheim Stadium	
4	August 29	St. Louis Cardinals	W 24–17	3–1	Jack Murphy Stadium	

== Regular season ==
=== Schedule ===
Week	Date	Opponent	Result	Record	Venue	Attendance	Recap
1	September 7	Miami Dolphins	**W** 50–28	1–0	Jack Murphy Stadium	57,726	Recap
2	September 14	at New York Giants	**L** 7–20	1–1	Giants Stadium	74,921	Recap
3	September 21	Washington Redskins	**L** 27–30	1–2	Jack Murphy Stadium	57,853	Recap
4	September 28	at **Los Angeles Raiders**	**L** 13–17	1–3	Los Angeles Memorial Coliseum	63,153	Recap
5	October 6	at **Seattle Seahawks**	**L** 7–33	1–4	Kingdome	63,207	Recap
6	October 12	**Denver Broncos**	**L** 14–31	1–5	Jack Murphy Stadium	55,662	Recap
7	October 19	at **Kansas City Chiefs**	**L** 41–42	1–6	Arrowhead Stadium	55,767	Recap
8	October 26	at Philadelphia Eagles	**L** 7–23	1–7	Veterans Stadium	41,469	Recap
9	November 2	**Kansas City Chiefs**	**L** 23–24	1–8	Jack Murphy Stadium	48,518	Recap
10	November 9	at **Denver Broncos**	**W** 9–3	2–8	Mile High Stadium	75,012	Recap
11	November 16	Dallas Cowboys	**L** 21–24	2–9	Jack Murphy Stadium	55,622	Recap
12	November 20	**Los Angeles Raiders**	**L** 31–37 (OT)	2–10	Jack Murphy Stadium	56,031	Recap
13	November 30	at Indianapolis Colts	**W** 17–3	3–10	Hoosier Dome	47,950	Recap
14	December 7	Houston Oilers	**W** 27–0	4–10	Jack Murphy Stadium	40,103	Recap
15	December 14	**Seattle Seahawks**	**L** 24–34	4–11	Jack Murphy Stadium	47,096	Recap
16	December 21	at Cleveland Browns	**L** 17–47	4–12	Cleveland Municipal Stadium	68,505	Recap
Note: Intra-division opponents are in **bold** text.

=== Game summaries ===
All game reports use the Pro Football Researchers' gamebook archive as a source.

==== Week 1: vs. Miami Dolphins ====
Week One: Miami Dolphins at San Diego Chargers – Game summary

Quarter	1	2	3	4	Total
Dolphins	0	14	7	7	**28**
**Chargers**	17	9	14	10	**50**

at Jack Murphy Stadium, San Diego, California

- Date: September 7
- Game time: 4:00 p.m. EDT
- Game weather: 68 °F (20 °C), relative humidity 82%, wind 9 miles per hour (14 km/h; 7.8 kn)
- Game attendance: 57,726
- Referee: Dick Jorgensen
- TV announcers (NBC): Jay Randolph and Jimmy Cefalo
- Box score

Game information

**First quarter**

- SDG – Gary Anderson 18-yard pass from Dan Fouts (Rolf Benirschke kick), 10:52. Chargers 7–0. **Drive: 5 plays, 41 yards, 2:07.**
- SDG – Rolf Benirschke 26-yard field goal, 2:17. Chargers 10–0. **Drive: 12 plays, 62 yards, 6:17.**
- SDG – Tim Spencer 17-yard run (Rolf Benirschke kick), 0:24. Chargers 17–0. **Drive: 3 plays, 30 yards, 0:53.**

**Second quarter**

- MIA – Mark Clayton 22-yard pass from Dan Marino (Fuad Reveiz kick), 12:00. Chargers 17–7. **Drive: 7 plays, 77 yards, 3:24.**
- SDG – Buford McGee 4-yard run (kick blocked), 4:02. Chargers 23–7. **Drive: 7 plays, 59 yards, 2:59.**
- MIA – Mark Clayton 49-yard pass from Dan Marino (Fuad Reveiz kick), 2:19. Chargers 23–14. **Drive: 3 plays, 75 yards, 1:43.**
- SDG – Rolf Benirschke 36-yard field goal, 0:28. Chargers 26–14. **Drive: 10 plays, 62 yards, 1:51.**

**Third quarter**

- SDG – Wes Chandler 7-yard pass from Dan Fouts (Rolf Benirschke kick), 9:22. Chargers 33–14. **Drive: 10 plays, 71 yards, 4:21.**
- MIA – Nat Moore 6-yard pass from Dan Marino (Fuad Reveiz kick), 6:47. Chargers 33–21. **Drive: 8 plays, 78 yards, 2:35.**
- SDG – Pete Holohan 17-yard pass from Dan Fouts (Rolf Benirschke kick), 0:21. Chargers 40–21. **Drive: 10 plays, 66 yards, 6:26.**

**Fourth quarter**

- SDG – Buford McGee 4-yard run (Rolf Benirschke kick), 14:15. Chargers 47–21. **Drive: 3 plays, 16 yards, 0:59.**
- SDG – Rolf Benirschke 36-yard field goal, 5:48. Chargers 50–21. **Drive: 8 plays, 20 yards, 4:25.**
- MIA – Nat Moore 17-yard pass from Don Strock (Fuad Reveiz kick), 0:58. Chargers 50–28. **Drive: 5 plays, 33 yards, 0:46.**

**Top passers**

- MIA – Dan Marino – 23/36, 290 yards, 3 TD
- SDG – Dan Fouts – 23/35, 293 yards, 3 TD

**Top rushers**

- MIA – Lorenzo Hampton – 6 rushes, 26 yards
- SDG – Lionel James – 10 rushes, 61 yards

**Top receivers**

- MIA – Mark Clayton – 5 receptions, 143 yards, 2 TD
- SDG – Wes Chandler – 6 receptions, 78 yards, TD

==== Week 2: at New York Giants ====
Week Two: San Diego Chargers at New York Giants – Game summary

Quarter	1	2	3	4	Total
Chargers	0	7	0	0	**7**
**Giants**	3	7	0	10	**20**

at Giants Stadium, East Rutherford, New Jersey

- Date: September 14
- Game time: 1:00 p.m. EDT
- Game weather: 65 °F (18.3 °C), relative humidity 52%, wind 17 miles per hour (27 km/h; 15 kn)
- Game attendance: 74,921
- Referee: Fred Wyant
- TV announcers (NBC): Don Criqui and Bob Trumpy
- Box score

Game information

**First quarter**

- NYG – Joe Cooper 21-yard field goal, 6:10. Giants 3–0. **Drive: 11 plays, 67 yards, 4:49.**

**Second quarter**

- NYG – Joe Morris 1-yard run (Joe Cooper kick), 13:16. Giants 10–0. **Drive: 5 plays, 32 yards, 1:35.**
- SDG – Gary Anderson 29-yard pass from Dan Fouts (Rolf Benirschke kick), 3:24. Giants 10–7. **Drive: 3 plays, 43 yards, 1:22.**

**Third quarter**

- No scoring plays.

**Fourth quarter**

- NYG – Lionel Manuel 12-yard pass from Phil Simms (Joe Cooper kick), 7:14. Giants 17–7. **Drive: 9 plays, 65 yards, 4:14.**
- NYG – Joe Cooper 20-yard field goal, 3:12. Giants 20–7. **Drive: 7 plays, 40 yards, 3:32.**

**Top passers**

- SDG – Dan Fouts – 19/43, 224 yards, TD, 5 INT
- NYG – Phil Simms – 18/37, 300 yards, TD, INT

**Top rushers**

- SDG – Buford McGee – 5 rushes, 19 yards
- NYG – Joe Morris – 30 rushes, 83 yards, TD

**Top receivers**

- SDG – Wes Chandler – 4 receptions, 58 yards
- NYG – Mark Bavaro – 5 receptions, 89 yards

==== Week 3: vs. Washington Redskins ====
Week Three: Washington Redskins at San Diego Chargers – Game summary

Quarter	1	2	3	4	Total
**Redskins**	3	7	13	7	**30**
Chargers	14	7	3	3	**27**

at Jack Murphy Stadium, San Diego, California

- Date: September 21
- Game time: 1:00 p.m. PDT
- Game weather: 64 °F (17.8 °C), relative humidity 72%, wind 8 miles per hour (13 km/h; 7.0 kn)
- Game attendance: 57,853
- Referee: Gordon McCarter
- TV announcers (CBS): Tim Ryan and Terry Bradshaw
- Box score

Game information

**First quarter**

- WAS – Mark Moseley 29-yard field goal, 10:06. Redskins 3–0. **Drive: 10 plays, 48 yards, 3:43.**
- SDG – Gary Anderson 13-yard pass from Dan Fouts (Rolf Benirschke kick), 6:17. Chargers 7–3. **Drive: 6 plays, 80 yards, 3:49.**
- SDG – Buford McGee 1-yard run (Rolf Benirschke kick), 0:47. Chargers 14–3. **Drive: 8 plays, 47 yards, 4:10.**

**Second quarter**

- SDG – Buford McGee 1-yard run (Rolf Benirschke kick), 8:02. Chargers 21–3. **Drive: 9 plays, 76 yards, 5:11.**
- WAS – George Rogers 2-yard run (Mark Moseley kick), 4:08. Chargers 21–10. **Drive: 6 plays, 53 yards, 3:54.**

**Third quarter**

- WAS – Mark Moseley 24-yard field goal, 10:48. Chargers 21–13. **Drive: 11 plays, 66 yards, 4:12.**
- WAS – Mark Moseley 26-yard field goal, 4:19. Chargers 21–16. **Drive: 10 plays, 50 yards, 4:24.**
- SDG – Rolf Benirschke 50-yard field goal, 2:03. Chargers 24–16. **Drive: 7 plays, 37 yards, 2:16.**
- WAS – George Rogers 10-yard run (Mark Moseley kick), 0:13. Chargers 24–23. **Drive: 3 plays, 74 yards, 1:50.**

**Fourth quarter**

- SDG – Rolf Benirschke 31-yard field goal, 9:07. Chargers 27–23. **Drive: 10 plays, 56 yards, 4:21.**
- WAS – Gary Clark 14-yard pass from Jay Schroeder (Mark Moseley kick), 1:16. Redskins 30–27. **Drive: 3 plays, 69 yards, 0:44.**

**Top passers**

- WAS – Jay Schroeder – 16/36, 341 yards, TD
- SDG – Dan Fouts – 22/36, 235 yards, TD, 3 INT

**Top rushers**

- WAS – George Rogers – 23 rushes, 87 yards, 2 TD
- SDG – Lionel James – 9 rushes, 67 yards

**Top receivers**

- WAS – Art Monk – 7 receptions, 174 yards
- SDG – Kellen Winslow – 4 receptions, 42 yards
  SDG – Charlie Joiner – 3 receptions, 42 yards

With the loss, the Chargers dropped to 1-2 on the season. This would be the Chargers last loss at home to Washington until 2025.

==== Week 4: at Los Angeles Raiders ====
Week Four: San Diego Chargers at Los Angeles Raiders – Game summary

Quarter	1	2	3	4	Total
Chargers	6	7	0	0	**13**
**Raiders**	0	7	7	3	**17**

at Memorial Coliseum, Los Angeles, California

- Date: September 28
- Game time: 1:00 p.m. PDT
- Game weather: 62 °F (16.7 °C), relative humidity 75%, wind 9 miles per hour (14 km/h; 7.8 kn)
- Game attendance: 57,726
- Referee: Jerry Markbreit
- TV announcers (NBC): Don Criqui and Bob Trumpy
- Box score

Game information

**First quarter**

- SDG – Kellen Winslow 9-yard pass from Dan Fouts (kick failed), 8:38. Chargers 6–0. **Drive: 10 plays, 81 yards, 4:26.**

**Second quarter**

- SDG – Trumaine Johnson 9-yard pass from Dan Fouts (Rolf Benirschke kick), 3:34. Chargers 13–0. **Drive: 7 plays, 34 yards, 2:56.**
- RAI – Dokie Williams 12-yard pass from Marc Wilson (Chris Bahr kick), 0:16. Chargers 13–7. **Drive: 6 plays, 40 yards, 0:43.**

**Third quarter**

- RAI – Jessie Hester 40-yard pass from Marc Wilson (Chris Bahr kick), 14:35. Raiders 14–13. **Drive: 1 play, 40 yards, 0:07.**

**Fourth quarter**

- RAI – Chris Bahr 18-yard field goal, 1:41. Raiders 17–13. **Drive: 13 plays, 73 yards, 5:32.**

**Top passers**

- SDG – Dan Fouts – 20/45, 208 yards, 2 TD, 3 INT
- RAI – Marc Wilson – 19/28, 314 yards, 2 TD, 2 INT

**Top rushers**

- SDG – Lionel James – 13 rushes, 41 yards
- RAI – Napoleon McCallum – 14 rushes, 57 yards

**Top receivers**

- SDG – Lionel James – 8 receptions, 77 yards
- RAI – Dokie Williams – 8 receptions, 143 yards, TD

==== Week 5: at Seattle Seahawks ====
Week Five: San Diego Chargers at Seattle Seahawks – Game summary

Quarter	1	2	3	4	Total
Chargers	7	0	0	0	**7**
**Seahawks**	0	6	17	10	**33**

at Kingdome, Seattle, Washington

- Date: October 6
- Game time: 6:00 p.m. PDT
- Game weather: N/A (game played indoors)
- Game attendance: 63,207
- Referee: Red Cashion
- TV announcers (ABC): Frank Gifford and O. J. Simpson
- Box score

Game information

**First quarter**

- SDG – Buford McGee 1-yard run (Rolf Benirschke kick), 7:32. Chargers 7–0. **Drive: 6 plays, 58 yards, 2:34.**

**Second quarter**

- SEA – Norm Johnson 29-yard field goal, 13:49. Chargers 7–3. **Drive: 15 plays, 68 yards, 5:54.**
- SEA – Norm Johnson 30-yard field goal, 0:08. Chargers 7–6. **Drive: 12 plays, 68 yards, 3:15.**

**Third quarter**

- SEA – Norm Johnson 54-yard field goal, 10:36. Seahawks 9–7. **Drive: 8 plays, 42 yards, 4:24.**
- SEA – Byron Franklin 46-yard pass from Dave Krieg (Norm Johnson kick), 9:04. Seahawks 16–7. **Drive: 3 plays, 50 yards, 0:15.**
- SEA – Steve Largent 15-yard pass from Dave Krieg (Norm Johnson kick), 8:51. Seahawks 23–7. **Drive: 1 play, 15 yards, 0:03.**

**Fourth quarter**

- SEA – Eric Lane 2-yard pass from Dave Krieg (Norm Johnson kick), 12:39. Seahawks 30–7. **Drive: 11 plays, 95 yards, 5:43.**
- SEA – Norm Johnson 20-yard field goal, 7:12. Seahawks 33–7. **Drive: 7 plays, 43 yards, 3:45.**

**Top passers**

- SDG – Dan Fouts – 20/31, 231 yards, 3 INT
- SEA – Dave Krieg – 21/35, 284 yards, 3 TD, 2 INT

**Top rushers**

- SDG – Lionel James – 10 rushes, 27 yards
- SEA – Curt Warner – 28 rushes, 142 yards

**Top receivers**

- SDG – Wes Chandler – 3 receptions, 61 yards
- SEA – Byron Franklin – 5 receptions, 118 yards, TD

==== Week 6: vs. Denver Broncos ====
Week Six: Denver Broncos at San Diego Chargers – Game summary

Quarter	1	2	3	4	Total
**Broncos**	7	3	7	14	**31**
Chargers	7	0	0	7	**14**

at Jack Murphy Stadium, San Diego, California

- Date: October 12
- Game time: 1:00 p.m. PDT
- Game weather: 66 °F (18.9 °C), relative humidity 74%, wind 10 miles per hour (16 km/h; 8.7 kn)
- Game attendance: 55,662
- Referee: Gene Barth
- TV announcers (NBC): Charlie Jones and Jimmy Cefalo
- Box score

Game information

**First quarter**

- SDG – Gary Anderson 7-yard pass from Dan Fouts (Rolf Benirschke kick), 11:09. Chargers 7–0. **Drive: 3 plays, 47 yards, 0:33.**
- DEN – Sammy Winder 1-yard run (Rich Karlis kick), 6:37. Tied 7–7. **Drive: 10 plays, 78 yards, 4:32.**

**Second quarter**

- DEN – Rich Karlis 21-yard field goal, 0:26. Broncos 10–7. **Drive: 10 plays, 65 yards, 5:19.**

**Third quarter**

- DEN – Gerald Willhite 3-yard pass from John Elway (Rich Karlis kick), 5:48. Broncos 17–7. **Drive: 12 plays, 89 yards, 5:47.**

**Fourth quarter**

- DEN – Gerald Willhite 1-yard run (Rich Karlis kick), 8:01. Broncos 24–7. **Drive: 15 plays, 82 yards, 10:11.**
- DEN – Mike Harden 41-yard punt return (Rich Karlis kick), 7:06. Broncos 31–7.
- SDG – Buford McGee 4-yard run (Rolf Benirschke kick), 1:29. Broncos 31–14. **Drive: 12 plays, 85 yards, 2:18.**

**Top passers**

- DEN – John Elway – 20/34, 242 yards, TD, INT
- SDG – Dan Fouts – 26/40, 352 yards, TD, 2 INT

**Top rushers**

- DEN – Sammy Winder – 17 rushes, 74 yards, TD
- SDG – Lionel James – 5 rushes, 27 yards

**Top receivers**

- DEN – Steve Watson – 4 receptions, 92 yards
- SDG – Gary Anderson – 6 receptions, 95 yards, TD

==== Week 7: at Kansas City Chiefs ====
Week Seven: San Diego Chargers at Kansas City Chiefs – Game summary

Quarter	1	2	3	4	Total
Chargers	7	17	7	10	**41**
**Chiefs**	7	21	7	7	**42**

at Arrowhead Stadium, Kansas City, Missouri

- Date: October 19
- Game time: 3:00 p.m. CDT
- Game weather: 61 °F (16.1 °C), relative humidity 74%, wind 7 miles per hour (11 km/h; 6.1 kn)
- Game attendance: 55,767
- Referee: Dick Jorgensen
- TV announcers (NBC): Charlie Jones and Jimmy Cefalo
- Box score

Game information

**First quarter**

- KAN – Stephone Paige 45-yard pass from Todd Blackledge (Nick Lowery kick), 9:38. Chiefs 7–0. **Drive: 1 play, 45 yards, 0:06.**
- SDG – Gary Anderson 7-yard pass from Dan Fouts (Rolf Benirschke kick), 3:41. Tied 7–7. **Drive: 13 plays, 75 yards, 5:57.**

**Second quarter**

- KAN – Lloyd Burruss 56-yard interception return (Nick Lowery kick), 9:53. Chiefs 14–7.
- KAN – Kevin Ross 21-yard fumble return (Nick Lowery kick), 9:41. Chiefs 21–7.
- SDG – Buford McGee 1-yard run (Rolf Benirschke kick), 4:41. Chiefs 21–14. **Drive: 9 plays, 75 yards, 5:00.**
- KAN – Lloyd Burruss 47-yard interception return (Nick Lowery kick), 2:42. Chiefs 28–14.
- SDG – Rolf Benirschke 30-yard field goal, 1:06. Chiefs 28–17. **Drive: 8 plays, 35 yards, 1:36.**
- SDG – Leslie O'Neal 5-yard interception return (Rolf Benirschke kick), 0:56. Chiefs 28–24.

**Third quarter**

- KAN – Stephone Paige 16-yard pass from Bill Kenney (Nick Lowery kick), 12:57. Chiefs 35–24. **Drive: 2 plays, 20 yards, 0:44.**
- SDG – Gary Anderson 2-yard run (Rolf Benirschke kick), 6:46. Chiefs 35–31. **Drive: 12 plays, 80 yards, 6:11.**

**Fourth quarter**

- SDG – Rolf Benirschke 21-yard field goal, 14:06. Chiefs 35–34. **Drive: 13 plays, 76 yards, 5:38.**
- KAN – Boyce Green 1-yard run (Nick Lowery kick), 10:18. Chiefs 42–34. **Drive: 7 plays, 80 yards, 3:48.**
- SDG – Gary Anderson 12-yard pass from Mark Herrmann (Rolf Benirschke kick), 3:42. Chiefs 42–41. **Drive: 5 plays, 34 yards, 0:56.**

**Top passers**

- SDG – Dan Fouts – 19/33, 200 yards, TD, 3 INT
- KAN – Bill Kenney – 6/9, 97 yards, TD

**Top rushers**

- SDG – Tim Spencer – 10 rushes, 57 yards
- KAN – Mike Pruitt – 10 rushes, 35 yards

**Top receivers**

- SDG – Gary Anderson – 11 receptions, 92 yards, 2 TD
- KAN – Stephone Paige – 3 receptions, 66 yards, 2 TD

==== Week 8: at Philadelphia Eagles ====
Week Eight: San Diego Chargers at Philadelphia Eagles – Game summary

Quarter	1	2	3	4	Total
Chargers	0	0	0	7	**7**
**Eagles**	3	3	3	14	**23**

at Veterans Stadium, Philadelphia, Pennsylvania

- Date: October 26
- Game time: 1:00 p.m. EST
- Game weather: 56 °F (13.3 °C), relative humidity 92%, wind 9 miles per hour (14 km/h; 7.8 kn)
- Game attendance: 41,469
- Referee: Pat Haggerty
- TV announcers (NBC): Kevin Slaten and Dave Rowe
- Box score

Game information

**First quarter**

- PHI – Paul McFadden 33-yard field goal, 6:28. Eagles 3–0. **Drive: 9 plays, 37 yards, 3:37.**

**Second quarter**

- PHI – Paul McFadden 34-yard field goal, 2:00. Eagles 6–0. **Drive: 5 plays, 41 yards, 3:18.**

**Third quarter**

- PHI – Paul McFadden 36-yard field goal, 4:58. Eagles 9–0. **Drive: 15 plays, 55 yards, 5:21.**

**Fourth quarter**

- PHI – Mike Quick 10-yard pass from Ron Jaworski (Paul McFadden kick), 10:02. Eagles 16–0. **Drive: 3 plays, 15 yards, 1:27.**
- SDG – Charlie Joiner 20-yard pass from Tom Flick (Rolf Benirschke kick), 7:49. Eagles 16–7. **Drive: 8 plays, 58 yards, 2:13.**
- PHI – Keith Byars 2-yard run (Paul McFadden kick), 1:12. Eagles 23–7. **Drive: 5 plays, 35 yards, 2:24.**

**Top passers**

- SDG – Mark Herrmann – 11/29, 122 yards, INT
- PHI – Ron Jaworski – 12/23, 98 yards, TD, INT

**Top rushers**

- SDG – Gary Anderson – 12 rushes, 60 yards
- PHI – Michael Haddix – 14 rushes, 48 yards

**Top receivers**

- SDG – Trumaine Johnson – 7 receptions, 85 yards
- PHI – John Spagnola – 7 receptions, 72 yards

==== Week 9: vs. Kansas City Chiefs ====
Week Nine: Kansas City Chiefs at San Diego Chargers – Game summary

Quarter	1	2	3	4	Total
**Chiefs**	0	0	7	17	**24**
Chargers	2	14	0	7	**23**

at Jack Murphy Stadium, San Diego, California

- Date: November 2
- Game time: 1:00 p.m. PST
- Game weather: 65 °F (18.3 °C), relative humidity 59%, wind 9 miles per hour (14 km/h; 7.8 kn)
- Game attendance: 48,518
- Referee: Fred Wyant
- TV announcers (NBC): Fred Roggin and Dave Rowe
- Box score

Game information

**First quarter**

- SDG – Safety, ball snapped out of end zone, 12:11. Chargers 2–0.

**Second quarter**

- SDG – Wes Chandler 7-yard pass from Tom Flick (Rolf Benirschke kick), 13:31. Chargers 9–0. **Drive: 6 plays, 16 yards, 4:34.**
- SDG – Tim Spencer 4-yard run (Rolf Benirschke kick), 10:42. Chargers 16–0. **Drive: 6 plays, 30 yards, 2:24.**

**Third quarter**

- KAN – Jeff Smith 1-yard pass from Bill Kenney (Nick Lowery kick), 4:08. Chargers 16–7. **Drive: 10 plays, 30 yards, 4:26.**

**Fourth quarter**

- KAN – Emile Harry 5-yard pass from Bill Kenney (Nick Lowery kick), 7:43. Chargers 16–14. **Drive: 6 plays, 30 yards, 2:01.**
- KAN – Mike Pruitt 1-yard run (Nick Lowery kick), 1:46. Chiefs 21–16. **Drive: 7 plays, 67 yards, 1:52.**
- SDG – Tom Flick 1-yard run (Rolf Benirschke kick), 1:02. Chargers 23–21. **Drive: 6 plays, 37 yards, 0:44.**
- KAN – Nick Lowery 37-yard field goal, 0:07. Chiefs 24–23. **Drive: 6 plays, 50 yards, 0:55.**

**Top passers**

- KAN – Bill Kenney – 21/32, 287 yards, 2 TD
- SDG – Tom Flick – 4/17, 42 yards, TD, 4 INT

**Top rushers**

- KAN – Jeff Smith – 10 rushes, 41 yards
- SDG – Gary Anderson – 25 rushes, 100 yards

**Top receivers**

- KAN – Henry Marshall – 7 receptions, 90 yards
  KAN – Carlos Carson – 4 receptions, 90 yards
- SDG – Wes Chandler – 3 receptions, 40 yards, TD

==== Week 10: at Denver Broncos ====
Week Ten: San Diego Chargers at Denver Broncos – Game summary

Quarter	1	2	3	4	Total
**Chargers**	3	3	0	3	**9**
Broncos	0	3	0	0	**3**

at Mile High Stadium, Denver, Colorado

- Date: November 9
- Game time: 2:00 p.m. MST
- Game weather: 31 °F (−0.6 °C), relative humidity 48%, wind 8 miles per hour (13 km/h; 7.0 kn), wind chill 24 °F (−4.4 °C)
- Game attendance: 75,012
- Referee: Fred Silva
- TV announcers (NBC): Charlie Jones and Jimmy Cefalo
- Box score

Game information

**First quarter**

- SDG – Rolf Benirschke 25-yard field goal, 5:37. Chargers 3–0. **Drive: 17 plays, 78 yards, 9:23.**

**Second quarter**

- DEN – Rich Karlis 44-yard field goal, 14:40. Tied 3–3. **Drive: 10 plays, 54 yards, 5:57.**
- SDG – Rolf Benirschke 48-yard field goal, 7:27. Chargers 6–3. **Drive: 11 plays, 45 yards, 7:13.**

**Third quarter**

- No scoring plays.

**Fourth quarter**

- SDG – Rolf Benirschke 21-yard field goal, 7:18. Chargers 9–3. **Drive: 16 plays, 48 yards, 8:45.**

**Top passers**

- SDG – Tom Flick – 16/22, 130 yards, INT
- DEN – John Elway – 13/31, 196 yards, 3 INT

**Top rushers**

- SDG – Curtis Adams – 16 rushes, 38 yards
- DEN – Sammy Winder – 9 rushes, 24 yards

**Top receivers**

- SDG – Kellen Winslow – 7 receptions, 54 yards
- DEN – Mark Jackson – 2 receptions, 76 yards

==== Week 11: vs. Dallas Cowboys ====
Week Eleven: Dallas Cowboys at San Diego Chargers – Game summary

Quarter	1	2	3	4	Total
**Cowboys**	10	0	0	14	**24**
Chargers	0	7	7	7	**21**

at Jack Murphy Stadium, San Diego, California

- Date: November 16
- Game time: 1:00 p.m. PST
- Game weather: 65 °F (18.3 °C), relative humidity 65%, wind 7 miles per hour (11 km/h; 6.1 kn)
- Game attendance: 55,622
- Referee: Tom Dooley
- TV announcers (CBS): Jack Buck and Joe Theismann
- Box score

Game information

**First quarter**

- DAL – Rafael Septien 33-yard field goal, 7:02. Cowboys 3–0. **Drive: 7 plays, 38 yards, 2:58.**
- DAL – Mike Sherrard 68-yard pass from Steve Pelluer (Rafael Septien kick), 3:24. Cowboys 10–0. **Drive: 4 plays, 80 yards, 1:39.**

**Second quarter**

- SDG – Tim Spencer 7-yard run (Rolf Benirschke kick), 3:17. Cowboys 10–7. **Drive: 8 plays, 53 yards, 3:40.**

**Third quarter**

- SDG – Kellen Winslow 28-yard pass from Dan Fouts (Rolf Benirschke kick), 6:39. Chargers 14–10. **Drive: 9 plays, 79 yards, 5:14.**

**Fourth quarter**

- SDG – Kellen Winslow 4-yard pass from Dan Fouts (Rolf Benirschke kick), 14:02. Chargers 21–10. **Drive: 9 plays, 80 yards, 3:36.**
- DAL – Herschel Walker 1-yard run (Rafael Septien kick), 7:26. Chargers 21–17. **Drive: 3 plays, 2 yards, 0:56.**
- DAL – Steve Pelluer 2-yard run (Rafael Septien kick), 1:37. Cowboys 24–21. **Drive: 4 plays, 61 yards, 0:32.**

**Top passers**

- DAL – Steve Pelluer – 18/33, 246 yards, TD
- SDG – Dan Fouts – 22/41, 275 yards, 2 TD

**Top rushers**

- DAL – Tony Dorsett – 14 rushes, 76 yards
- SDG – Curtis Adams – 9 rushes, 33 yards

**Top receivers**

- DAL – Mike Sherrard – 4 receptions, 115 yards, TD
- SDG – Gary Anderson – 8 receptions, 85 yards

==== Week 12: vs. Los Angeles Raiders ====
Week Twelve: Los Angeles Raiders at San Diego Chargers – Game summary

Quarter	1	2	3	4	OT	Total
**Raiders**	14	7	10	0	6	**37**
Chargers	0	10	7	14	0	**31**

at Jack Murphy Stadium, San Diego, California

- Date: November 20
- Game time: 5:00 p.m. PST
- Game weather: 61 °F (16.1 °C), relative humidity 88%, wind 8 miles per hour (13 km/h; 7.0 kn)
- Game attendance: 56,031
- Referee: Gordon McCarter
- TV announcers (ABC): Al Michaels and Frank Gifford
- Box score

Game information

**First quarter**

- RAI – Jerry Robinson 2-yard blocked punt return (Chris Bahr kick), 11:41. Raiders 7–0.
- RAI – Todd Christensen 11-yard pass from Jim Plunkett (Chris Bahr kick), 6:29. Raiders 14–0. **Drive: 6 plays, 79 yards, 2:58.**

**Second quarter**

- SDG – Rolf Benirschke 47-yard field goal, 9:12. Raiders 14–3. **Drive: 11 plays, 46 yards, 4:22.**
- SDG – Curtis Adams 19-yard run (Rolf Benirschke kick), 2:26. Raiders 14–10. **Drive: 8 plays, 65 yards, 3:16.**
- RAI – Dokie Williams 10-yard pass from Jim Plunkett (Chris Bahr kick), 0:24. Raiders 21–10. **Drive: 7 plays, 84 yards, 2:02.**

**Third quarter**

- RAI – Chris Bahr 52-yard field goal, 12:31. Raiders 24–10. **Drive: 4 plays, 7 yards, 0:53.**
- RAI – Lester Hayes 39-yard fumble return (Chris Bahr kick), 12:04. Raiders 31–10.
- SDG – Curtis Adams 1-yard run (Rolf Benirschke kick), 0:37. Raiders 31–17. **Drive: 5 plays, 71 yards, 1:32.**

**Fourth quarter**

- SDG – Curtis Adams 13-yard run (Rolf Benirschke kick), 12:11. Raiders 31–24. **Drive: 4 plays, 39 yards, 1:38.**
- SDG – Charlie Joiner 16-yard pass from Mark Herrmann (Rolf Benirschke kick), 1:01. Tied 31–31. **Drive: 9 plays, 66 yards, 2:22.**

**Overtime**

- RAI – Marcus Allen 28-yard run, 6:27. Raiders 37–31. **Drive: 5 plays, 56 yards, 2:02.**

**Top passers**

- RAI – Jim Plunkett – 23/40, 348 yards, 2 TD, INT
- SDG – Mark Herrmann – 13/23, 198 yards, TD

**Top rushers**

- RAI – Marcus Allen – 21 rushes, 88 yards, TD
- SDG – Curtis Adams – 26 rushes, 93 yards, 3 TD

**Top receivers**

- RAI – Todd Christensen – 11 receptions, 173 yards, TD
- SDG – Gary Anderson – 7 receptions, 113 yards

==== Week 13: at Indianapolis Colts ====
Week Thirteen: San Diego Chargers at Indianapolis Colts – Game summary

Quarter	1	2	3	4	Total
**Chargers**	10	0	0	7	**17**
Colts	0	0	3	0	**3**

at Hoosier Dome, Indianapolis, Indiana

- Date: November 30
- Game time: 1:00 p.m. EST
- Game weather: N/A (game played indoors)
- Game attendance: 47,950
- Referee: Red Cashion
- TV announcers (NBC): Jay Randolph and Dave Rowe
- Box score

Game information

**First quarter**

- SDG – Rolf Benirschke 19-yard field goal, 4:26. Chargers 3–0. **Drive: 18 plays, 82 yards, 10:34.**
- SDG – Wes Chandler 30-yard pass from Dan Fouts (Rolf Benirschke kick), 0:43. Chargers 10–0. **Drive: 2 plays, 42 yards, 0:12.**

**Second quarter**

- No scoring plays.

**Third quarter**

- IND – Dean Biasucci 27-yard field goal, 9:27. Chargers 10–3. **Drive: 10 plays, 60 yards, 5:33.**

**Fourth quarter**

- SDG – Curtis Adams 1-yard run (Rolf Benirschke kick), 1:42. Chargers 17–3. **Drive: 7 plays, 53 yards, 2:45.**

**Top passers**

- SDG – Dan Fouts – 24/31, 290 yards, TD, 2 INT
- IND – Jack Trudeau – 15/28, 130 yards, INT

**Top rushers**

- SDG – Curtis Adams – 21 rushes, 68 yards, TD
- IND – Albert Bentley – 8 rushes, 33 yards

**Top receivers**

- SDG – Wes Chandler – 5 receptions, 110 yards, TD
- IND – Bill Brooks – 7 receptions, 76 yards

==== Week 14: vs. Houston Oilers ====
Week Fourteen: Houston Oilers at San Diego Chargers – Game summary

Quarter	1	2	3	4	Total
Oilers	0	0	0	0	**0**
**Chargers**	0	17	3	7	**27**

at Jack Murphy Stadium, San Diego, California

- Date: December 7
- Game time: 1:00 p.m. PST
- Game weather: 58 °F (14.4 °C), relative humidity 81%, wind 9 miles per hour (14 km/h; 7.8 kn)
- Game attendance: 40,103
- Referee: Jerry Seeman
- TV announcers (NBC): Charlie Jones and Jimmy Cefalo
- Box score

Game information

**First quarter**

- No scoring plays.

**Second quarter**

- SDG – Tim Spencer 1-yard run (Rolf Benirschke kick), 13:21. Raiders 14–3. **Drive: 3 plays, 23 yards, 0:59.**
- SDG – Gary Anderson 31-yard pass from Dan Fouts (Rolf Benirschke kick), 13:01. Raiders 14–10. **Drive: 1 play, 31 yards, 0:07.**
- SDG – Rolf Benirschke 20-yard field goal, 0:48. Raiders 31–17. **Drive: 12 plays, 57 yards, 4:10.**

**Third quarter**

- SDG – Rolf Benirschke 35-yard field goal, 10:45. Raiders 31–17. **Drive: 10 plays, 62 yards, 4:15.**

**Fourth quarter**

- SDG – Kellen Winslow 4-yard pass from Gary Anderson (Rolf Benirschke kick), 8:24. Raiders 31–24. **Drive: 7 plays, 49 yards, 4:05.**

**Top passers**

- HOU – Oliver Luck – 10/26, 110 yards, 2 INT
- SDG – Dan Fouts – 21/30, 250 yards, TD

**Top rushers**

- HOU – Ray Wallace – 9 rushes, 45 yards
- SDG – Curtis Adams – 17 rushes, 53 yards

**Top receivers**

- HOU – Ernest Givins – 4 receptions, 50 yards
  HOU – Allen Pinkett – 4 receptions, 50 yards
- SDG – Wes Chandler – 7 receptions, 75 yards

==== Week 15: vs. Seattle Seahawks ====
Week Fifteen: Seattle Seahawks at San Diego Chargers – Game summary

Quarter	1	2	3	4	Total
**Seahawks**	10	7	3	14	**34**
Chargers	0	17	0	7	**24**

at Jack Murphy Stadium, San Diego, California

- Date: December 14
- Game time: 1:00 p.m. PST
- Game weather: 57 °F (13.9 °C), relative humidity 71%, wind 6 miles per hour (9.7 km/h; 5.2 kn)
- Game attendance: 47,096
- Referee: Chuck Heberling
- TV announcers (NBC): Jay Randolph and Dave Rowe
- Box score

Game information

**First quarter**

- SEA – Norm Johnson 29-yard field goal, 9:29. Seahawks 3–0. **Drive: 10 plays, 32 yards, 4:06.**
- SEA – Steve Largent 6-yard pass from Dave Krieg (Norm Johnson kick), 3:44. Seahawks 10–0. **Drive: 12 plays, 74 yards, 4:31.**

**Second quarter**

- SDG – Tim Spencer 1-yard run (Rolf Benirschke kick), 13:38. Seahawks 10–7. **Drive: 10 plays, 79 yards, 5:06.**
- SEA – Daryl Turner 72-yard pass from Dave Krieg (Norm Johnson kick), 13:19. Seahawks 17–7. **Drive: 1 play, 72 yards, 0:19.**
- SDG – Rolf Benirschke 23-yard field goal, 4:14. Seahawks 17–10. **Drive: 16 plays, 76 yards, 9:05.**
- SDG – Kellen Winslow 14-yard pass from Dan Fouts (Rolf Benirschke kick), 0:10. Tied 17–17. **Drive: 7 plays, 66 yards, 0:58.**

**Third quarter**

- SEA – Norm Johnson 25-yard field goal, 9:01. Seahawks 20–17. **Drive: 10 plays, 64 yards, 5:59.**

**Fourth quarter**

- SEA – Steve Largent 23-yard pass from Dave Krieg (Norm Johnson kick), 13:40. Seahawks 27–17. **Drive: 14 plays, 96 yards, 7:42.**
- SDG – Tim Spencer 1-yard run (Rolf Benirschke kick), 6:56. Seahawks 27–24. **Drive: 13 plays, 72 yards, 6:44.**
- SEA – Ray Butler 14-yard pass from Dave Krieg (Norm Johnson kick), 2:23. Seahawks 34–24. **Drive: 11 plays, 72 yards, 4:33.**

**Top passers**

- SEA – Dave Krieg – 15/21, 305 yards, 4 TD
- SDG – Dan Fouts – 21/38, 237 yards, TD, INT

**Top rushers**

- SEA – Curt Warner – 28 rushes, 93 yards
- SDG – Curtis Adams – 18 rushes, 66 yards

**Top receivers**

- SEA – Steve Largent – 6 receptions, 96 yards, 2 TD
- SDG – Kellen Winslow – 8 receptions, 105 yards, TD

==== Week 16: at Cleveland Browns ====
Week Sixteen: San Diego Chargers at Cleveland Browns – Game summary

Quarter	1	2	3	4	Total
Chargers	0	10	7	0	**17**
**Browns**	7	13	17	10	**47**

at Municipal Stadium, Cleveland, Ohio

- Date: December 21
- Game time: 1:00 p.m. EST
- Game weather: 34 °F (1.1 °C), relative humidity 67%, wind 7 miles per hour (11 km/h; 6.1 kn), wind chill 28 °F (−2.2 °C)
- Game attendance: 68,505
- Referee: Bob Frederic
- TV announcers (NBC): Tom Hammond and Jon Morris
- Box score

Game information

**First quarter**

- CLE – Webster Slaughter 46-yard pass from Herman Fontenot (Mark Moseley kick), 4:15. Browns 7–0. **Drive: 6 plays, 80 yards, 3:22.**

**Second quarter**

- CLE – Kevin Mack 2-yard run (Mark Moseley kick), 11:25. Browns 14–0. **Drive: 9 plays, 60 yards, 5:50.**
- SDG – Wes Chandler 19-yard pass from Dan Fouts (Rolf Benirschke kick), 8:20. Browns 14–7. **Drive: 8 plays, 64 yards, 3:05.**
- SDG – Rolf Benirschke 40-yard field goal, 1:01. Browns 14–10. **Drive: 5 plays, 15 yards, 0:55.**
- CLE – Brian Brennan 57-yard pass from Bernie Kosar (kick failed), 0:06. Browns 20–10. **Drive: 5 plays, 84 yards, 0:55.**

**Third quarter**

- CLE – Harry Holt 1-yard pass from Bernie Kosar (Mark Moseley kick), 13:12. Browns 27–10. **Drive: 5 plays, 19 yards, 1:33.**
- CLE – Herman Fontenot 9-yard run (Mark Moseley kick), 10:00. Browns 34–10. **Drive: 4 plays, 52 yards, 0:54.**
- CLE – Mark Moseley 37-yard field goal, 6:36. Browns 37–10. **Drive: 7 plays, 10 yards, 3:14.**
- SDG – Gary Anderson 65-yard pass from Dan Fouts (Rolf Benirschke kick, 4:49. Browns 37–17. **Drive: 5 plays, 79 yards, 1:47.**

**Fourth quarter**

- CLE – Curtis Dickey 2-yard run (Mark Moseley kick), 13:54. Browns 44–17. **Drive: 9 plays, 70 yards, 5:46.**
- CLE – Mark Moseley 32-yard field goal, 3:19. Browns 47–17. **Drive: 7 plays, 45 yards, 3:49.**

**Top passers**

- SDG – Dan Fouts – 15/27, 236 yards, 2 TD
- CLE – Bernie Kosar – 21/28, 258 yards, 2 TD

**Top rushers**

- SDG – Tim Spencer – 5 rushes, 22 yards
- CLE – Major Everett – 10 rushes, 38 yards

**Top receivers**

- SDG – Wes Chandler – 6 receptions, 113 yards, TD
- CLE – Brian Brennan – 7 receptions, 176 yards, TD

=== Standings ===
AFC West
	W	L	T	PCT	DIV	CONF	PF	PA	STK
^{(2)} Denver Broncos	11	5	0	.688	5–3	8–4	378	327	L1
^{(5)} Kansas City Chiefs	10	6	0	.625	5–3	9–5	358	326	W3
Seattle Seahawks	10	6	0	.625	5–3	7–5	366	293	W5
Los Angeles Raiders	8	8	0	.500	4–4	7–5	323	346	L4
San Diego Chargers	4	12	0	.250	1–7	4–8	335	396	L2

== Awards ==
Gary Anderson was the only Charger named to the AFC Pro Bowl squad, making the team as a kick returner. None were named first or second team All-Pro by the Associated Press. Leslie O'Neal won the AP Defensive Rookie of the Year award with 34 votes; no other play received more than 20.
