= Lionel James =

American football player (1962–2022)

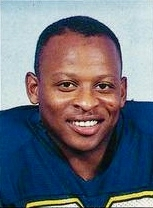
- James with the San Diego Chargers c. 1988

No. 26
- Position: Running back

Personal information
- Born: May 25, 1962; Albany, Georgia, U.S.
- Died: February 25, 2022 (aged 59); Birmingham, Alabama, U.S.
- Listed height: 5 ft 6 in (1.68 m)
- Listed weight: 171 lb (78 kg)

Career information
- High school: Dougherty (Albany)
- College: Auburn
- NFL draft: 1984: 5th round, 118th overall pick

Career history
- San Diego Chargers (1984–1988); Kansas City Chiefs (1989)*
- * Offseason or practice squad member only

Awards and highlights
- NFL kickoff return yards leader (1984); San Diego Chargers 40th Anniversary Team; 2× Second-team All-SEC (1982, 1983)

Career NFL statistics
- Rushing yards: 1,061
- Rushing average: 4.6
- Rushing touchdowns: 4
- Receptions: 209
- Receiving yards: 2,278
- Receiving touchdowns: 10
- Stats at Pro Football Reference

Lionel "Little Train" James (May 25, 1962 – February 25, 2022) was an American professional football player who was a running back for the San Diego Chargers in the National Football League (NFL). He played college football for the Auburn Tigers. Undersized at 5 feet 6 inches (1.68 m) and 171 pounds (78 kg), he spent his entire five-year NFL career with the Chargers from 1984 to 1988. His best year as a pro came during the 1985 season, when he set then-NFL season records for receiving yards by a running back and all-purpose yardage. He also led the American Football Conference (AFC) in receptions that year.

== Early life and college ==
James was born in Albany, Georgia, where he attended Dougherty High School, playing football, basketball, and running track. Because of his small stature of 5 feet 6 inches (1.68 m) and 150 pounds (68 kg), Auburn University was the only major college to recruit him. He played college football for the Tigers, sharing the backfield with Bo Jackson. James was Auburn's leading rusher with 561 yards in 1981, head coach Pat Dye's first year with the team. He ran for over 700 yards in consecutive seasons as a junior and senior. James also led the team in all-purpose yardage in 1981 and 1982, when he also led the nation in punt returns with a 15.8-yard average. He was a captain in 1983, when the Tigers won the Southeast Conference championship and the 1984 Sugar Bowl. Auburn finished 11–1 and ranked No. 3 by the Associated Press. James was inducted into the Alabama Sports Hall of Fame in 2006.

== Professional career ==
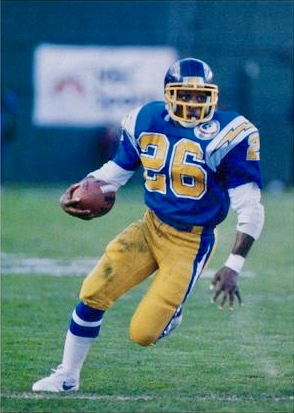
James with the Chargers c. 1985

James was selected by the San Diego Chargers in the fifth round of the 1984 NFL draft. In 1985, he set the NFL record for all-purpose yards in a season with 2,535 yards. He also set the record for receiving yards by a running back with 1,027 yards, becoming the first running back with a 1,000-yard receiving season in the league. He led the AFC in receptions with 86, and led the Chargers in yardage from rushing (516), punt returns (213), and kickoff returns (779). (Note: James was second on the Chargers in receiving yards behind Wes Chandler (1,199).) On November 10, 1985, James had his best day as a pro versus the Los Angeles Raiders. He gained 345 all-purpose yards including a career best 168 yards receiving and scored the winning touchdown in a 40–34 overtime victory. The total yardage was second at the time only to the 373 yards by Billy Cannon in 1961, and remains a Chargers franchise record. He might have broken the record in an earlier game that season against the Cincinnati Bengals except for a Chargers penalty that cost him 89 yards of a 100-yard kickoff return. James finished that game with 316 yards.

James missed nine games in 1986 with an ankle injury. He rebounded the following season to score a team-high six touchdowns, including an 81-yard punt return. However, San Diego limited his opportunities after the ankle injury, playing him at wide receiver and less in the backfield, while also limiting him to punt returns and not kickoffs. James was hampered by a hip flexor injury in 1988, although he still managed to catch 36 passes. He was waived during preseason in 1989, when the Chargers opted for a quicker running back, rookie Dana Brinson. The Kansas City Chiefs claimed James, planning to use him primarily as a wide receiver. They waived him days later after a failed physical examination due to his hip.

James ended his career with 1,061 yards rushing and 2,278 receiving yards. He scored 16 career touchdowns, including two on punt returns. He was voted as the kick returner on the Chargers 40th Anniversary Team. His record for receiving yards by a running back was broken by Marshall Faulk (1,048) in 1999, and his all-purpose yardage record was eclipsed in 2000 by Derrick Mason (2,690 yards).

== NFL career statistics ==
Legend
**Bold**	Career high

Year	Team	Games		Rushing					Receiving				
Year	Team	GP	GS	Att	Yds	Avg	Lng	TD	Rec	Yds	Avg	Lng	TD
1984	SDG	**16**	2	25	115	4.6	20	0	23	206	9.0	31	0
1985	SDG	**16**	7	**105**	**516**	**4.9**	**56**	**2**	**86**	**1,027**	11.9	**67**	**6**
1986	SDG	7	1	51	224	4.4	24	0	23	173	7.5	18	0
1987	SDG	12	**11**	27	102	3.8	15	**2**	41	593	**14.5**	46	3
1988	SDG	**16**	1	23	105	4.6	23	0	36	279	7.8	31	1
		67	22	231	1,062	4.6	56	4	209	2,278	10.9	67	10

== Coaching career ==
James began his coaching career with stints at Terrell Middle High in Dawson, Georgia; Woodlawn High in Birmingham, Alabama; and Appalachian State. He returned to Auburn to coach tight ends under head coach Terry Bowden from 1996 to 1997. James left in 1998 to become the running backs coach for the Kansas City Chiefs. He was the offensive coordinator of the Birmingham Steeldogs of the arenafootball2 in 2000, and served as the running backs coach for the Birmingham Thunderbolts of the XFL in 2001.

== Personal life ==
James was married to his wife and had two daughters and a son. James graduated from Auburn with a degree in mathematics in 1989. He was also a math teacher while he was coaching in high school. After his coaching career ended, he returned to teaching high school math in Birmingham.

James was diagnosed with dementia at the age of 55. After a long illness, he died in Birmingham on February 25, 2022, at age 59. He was diagnosed with chronic traumatic encephalopathy (CTE) posthumously.

== See also ==
- List of NCAA major college yearly punt and kickoff return leaders
- List of NFL players with chronic traumatic encephalopathy
