= Vince Osby =

American football player (born 1961)

No. 56
- Position: Linebacker

Personal information
- Born: July 8, 1961 (age 65); Los Angeles, California, U.S.
- Listed height: 5 ft 11 in (1.80 m)
- Listed weight: 220 lb (100 kg)

Career information
- High school: Lynwood (Lynwood, California)
- College: Illinois
- NFL draft: 1984: undrafted

Career history
- San Diego Chargers (1984–1985); Cleveland Browns (1986)*
- * Offseason or practice squad member only
- Stats at Pro Football Reference

Vincent Lee Osby (born July 8, 1961) is an American former professional football linebacker who played for the San Diego Chargers of the National Football League (NFL). He played college football for the Illinois Fighting Illini.

== Early life ==
Vincent Lee Osby was born on July 8, 1961, in Los Angeles, California. He attended Lynwood High School in Lynwood, California.

== College career ==
Osby played junior college football at Pasadena City College from 1980 to 1981. He transferred to the University of Illinois at Urbana-Champaign, where he was a two-year letterman for the Fighting Illini from 1982 to 1983. He was part of the Illini team that made it to the 1984 Rose Bowl.

== Professional career ==
After going undrafted in the 1984 NFL draft, Osby signed with the San Diego Chargers on May 20. He impressed with his quickness during the 1984 preseason, recovering a fumble and posting a two-yard tackle-for-loss during a goal-line stand. He was released on August 27, after the final preseason game, but re-signed the next day. Osby played in all 16 games for the Chargers during the 1984 regular season as a reserve linebacker. He was placed on injured reserve on August 26, 1985 with a sprained ankle, released on October 9, re-signed on October 11, placed on injured reserve again on October 24 after reinjuring his ankle, and activated on November 23. He played in seven games overall in 1985 and recovered one fumble for 46 yards. Osby was waived by San Diego on May 9, 1986.

Osby was claimed off waivers by the Cleveland Browns on May 23, 1986. He was released on August 22, 1986, before the third game of the 1986 preseason.
