= Terry Lewis (American football) =

American football player (born 1962)

No. 32
- Position: Cornerback

Personal information
- Born: December 9, 1962 (age 63); Detroit, Michigan, U.S.
- Listed height: 5 ft 11 in (1.80 m)
- Listed weight: 193 lb (88 kg)

Career information
- High school: Highland Park (Highland Park, Michigan)
- College: Michigan State
- NFL draft: 1985: 6th round, 150th overall pick

Career history
- San Diego Chargers (1985); Indianapolis Colts (1986)*
- * Offseason or practice squad member only
- Stats at Pro Football Reference

Terence L. Lewis (born December 9, 1962) is an American former professional football cornerback who played for the San Diego Chargers of the National Football League (NFL). He played college football for the Michigan State Spartans and was selected by the Chargers in the sixth round of the 1985 NFL draft.

== Early life ==
Terence L. Lewis was born on December 9, 1962, in Detroit, Michigan. He attended Highland Park High School in Highland Park, Michigan.

== College career ==
Lewis enrolled at Michigan State University to play college football for the Spartans. He was a four-year letterman and four-year starter from 1981 to 1984. He recorded three interceptions for 27 yards during his college career. Lewis earned honorable mention All-Big Ten Conference honors as a senior in 1984.

== Professional career ==
Lewis was selected by the San Diego Chargers in the sixth round, with the 150th overall pick, of the 1985 NFL draft. He signed with the team on July 5. He was placed on injured reserve on September 3 and activated on October 18, 1985. Lewis played in ten games overall for the Chargers during the 1985 season as a reserve cornerback.

By the 1986 season, Lewis had joined the Indianapolis Colts. He gave up two touchdowns during a training camp scrimmage in July 1986. He was released on August 18, 1986, after the second game of the 1986 preseason.
