= Ronnie O'Bard =

American football player (born 1958)

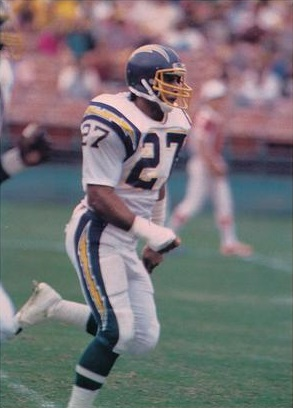
- O'Bard c. 1985

No. 27
- Position: Defensive back

Personal information
- Born: June 11, 1958 (age 68); San Diego, California, U.S.
- Listed height: 5 ft 9 in (1.75 m)
- Listed weight: 190 lb (86 kg)

Career information
- High school: Spring Valley (CA) Monte Vista
- College: Idaho, BYU

Career history
- San Diego Chargers (1985)
- Stats at Pro Football Reference

Ronnie O'Bard (born June 11, 1958) is an American former football defensive back. He played for the San Diego Chargers in 1985.
