= Fred Robinson (gridiron football, born 1961) =

American football player (born 1961)

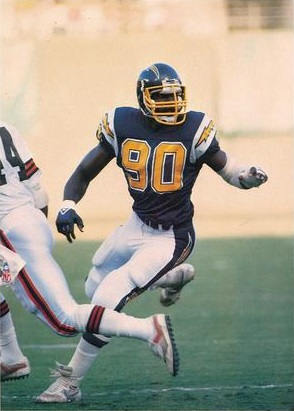
- Robinson c. 1985

No. 90, 91
- Position: Linebacker

Personal information
- Born: October 22, 1961 (age 65); Miami, Florida, U.S.
- Listed height: 6 ft 4 in (1.93 m)
- Listed weight: 240 lb (109 kg)

Career information
- High school: Miami Jackson
- College: Miami (FL)
- NFL draft: 1984: 8th round, 198th overall pick

Career history
- Tampa Bay Buccaneers (1984)*; San Diego Chargers (1984–1986); Miami Dolphins (1986); Detroit Lions (1987)*; Winnipeg Blue Bombers (1987)
- * Offseason or practice squad member only

Awards and highlights
- National champion (1983)

Career NFL statistics
- Sacks: 14.5
- Fumble recoveries: 3
- Stats at Pro Football Reference

Fred Lee Robinson (born October 22, 1961) is an American former professional football player who played linebacker for three seasons for the San Diego Chargers and Miami Dolphins.

He was a member of the 1983 Miami Hurricanes Championship team that beat Nebraska 31–30 in the 1984 Orange Bowl.
