= Buford McGee =

American football player (born 1960)

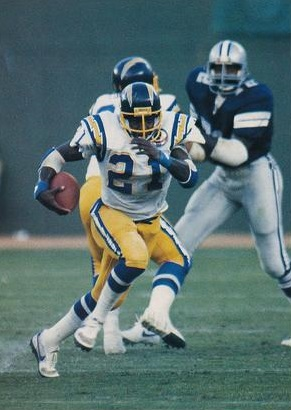
- McGee in 1984

No. 21, 24, 31
- Position: Running back

Personal information
- Born: August 16, 1960 (age 66); Durant, Mississippi, U.S.
- Listed height: 6 ft 0 in (1.83 m)
- Listed weight: 206 lb (93 kg)

Career information
- High school: Durant
- College: Ole Miss
- NFL draft: 1984: 11th round, 286th overall pick

Career history
- San Diego Chargers (1984–1986); Los Angeles Rams (1987–1991); Green Bay Packers (1992)

Awards and highlights
- Daniel F. Reeves Memorial Award (1990)

Career NFL statistics
- Rushing yards: 1,086
- Rushing average: 3.8
- Receptions: 155
- Receiving yards: 1,264
- Total touchdowns: 30
- Stats at Pro Football Reference

Buford Lamar McGee (born August 16, 1960) is an American former professional football player who was a running back in the National Football League (NFL). He played college football for the Ole Miss Rebels. He played nine seasons in the NFL for the San Diego Chargers from 1984 to 1986, the Los Angeles Rams from 1987 to 1991, and the Green Bay Packers in 1992. During his rookie season, McGee scored the winning touchdown on a 25-yard-run in overtime on November 18, 1984, as the Chargers defeated the 11–0 Miami Dolphins, 34–28.
