= Gary Kowalski (American football) =

American football player (born 1960)

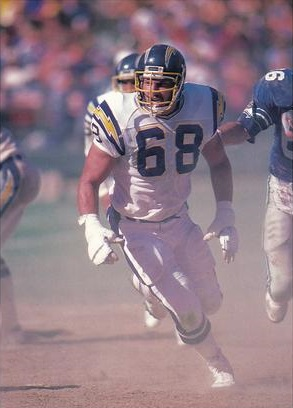
- Kowalski c. 1985

No. 76, 68
- Position: Offensive tackle

Personal information
- Born: July 2, 1960 (age 66); New Haven, Connecticut, U.S.
- Listed height: 6 ft 6 in (1.98 m)
- Listed weight: 280 lb (127 kg)

Career information
- College: Boston College
- NFL draft: 1983: 6th round, 144th overall pick

Career history
- Los Angeles Rams (1983); San Diego Chargers (1985–1988)

Career NFL statistics
- Games played: 58
- Games started: 28
- Fumble recoveries: 1
- Stats at Pro Football Reference

Gary Kowalski (born July 2, 1960) is an American former professional football player who was an offensive lineman for six seasons with the Los Angeles Rams and San Diego Chargers of the National Football League (NFL).

Kowalski played college football for the Boston College Eagles and was selected by the Rams in the sixth round of the 1983 NFL draft. He was then traded to Chargers as a left tackle in 1985. Kowalski played in 58 career NFL games and started in 28. As of 2019 he currently resides where he grew up in Deep River, Connecticut.
