= Earl Wilson (gridiron football) =

American gridiron football player (born 1958)

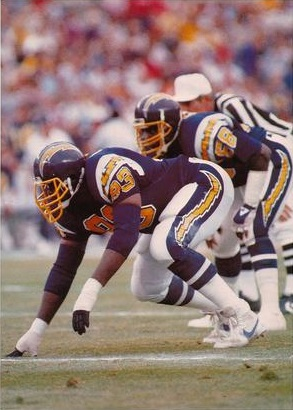
- Wilson c. 1985

No. 58, 93
- Position: Defensive lineman

Personal information
- Born: September 13, 1958 (age 68); Long Branch, New Jersey, U.S.
- Listed height: 6 ft 4 in (1.93 m)
- Listed weight: 276 lb (125 kg)

Career information
- High school: Atlantic City (Atlantic City, New Jersey)
- College: Kentucky (1976–1980)
- NFL draft: 1981: undrafted

Career history
- Toronto Argonauts (1982–1984); San Diego Chargers (1985–1987)

Awards and highlights
- Grey Cup champion (1983)
- Stats at Pro Football Reference

Earl Wilson (born September 13, 1958) is an American former professional football defensive lineman who played three seasons with the San Diego Chargers of the National Football League (NFL) and three seasons with the Toronto Argonauts of the Canadian Football League (CFL). He played college football at the University of Kentucky. He was a member of the Argonauts team that won the 71st Grey Cup.

== Early life and college ==
Earl Wilson was born on September 13, 1958, in Long Branch, New Jersey. He attended Atlantic City High School in Atlantic City, New Jersey.

He was a member of the Kentucky Wildcats of the University of Kentucky from to 1976 to 1980. He was a letterman in 1977, 1978, and 1980.

== Professional career ==
Wilson played in 11 games for the Toronto Argonauts of the Canadian Football League in 1982 and recorded 4.5 sacks. He played in all 16 games in 1983, totaling 7.5 sacks and two fumble recoveries. The Argonauts finished the 1983 season with a 12–4 record and eventually advanced to the 71st Grey Cup, where they beat the BC Lions to claim Toronto's first Grey Cup in 31 years. Wilson played in 14 games for the Argonauts in 1984, recording five sacks and two fumble recoveries. Wilson was a defensive tackle during his time in the CFL.

Wilson signed with the San Diego Chargers on April 10, 1985. He appeared in all 16 games, starting nine, for the Chargers during the 1985 season, accumulating three sacks and one fumble recovery. He played in all 16 games for the second straight season, starting six, in 1986, and made 5.5 sacks. He became a free agent after the 1986 season and re-signed with the team on August 17, 1987. Wilson started the first game of the 1987 season before being released on September 16, 1987. He was primarily a defensive end during his time in the NFL.
