= Tony Simmons (defensive end) =

American football player (born 1962)

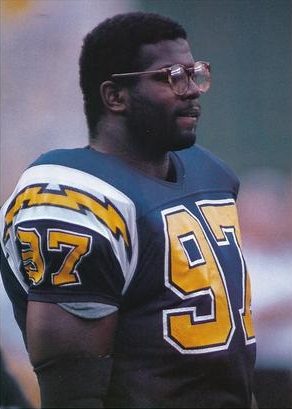
- Simmons c. 1985

No. 97
- Position: Defensive end

Personal information
- Born: December 18, 1962 (age 63); Oakland, California, U.S.
- Listed height: 6 ft 4 in (1.93 m)
- Listed weight: 270 lb (122 kg)

Career information
- High school: McClymonds (Oakland)
- College: Tennessee (1981–1984)
- NFL draft: 1985: 12th round, 318th overall pick

Career history
- San Diego Chargers (1985–1987); Buffalo Bills (1988)*; Dallas Cowboys (1989)*; British Columbia Lions (1989–1990)
- * Offseason or practice squad member only

Career NFL statistics
- Games played: 16
- Stats at Pro Football Reference

Anthony Earl Simmons (born December 11, 1962) is an American former professional football player who was a defensive end for the San Diego Chargers of the National Football League (NFL). He was selected by the Chargers in the 12th round (318th overall) of the 1985 NFL draft. He played college football for the Tennessee Volunteers.
