= John Hendy (American football) =

Gridiron football player (born 1962)

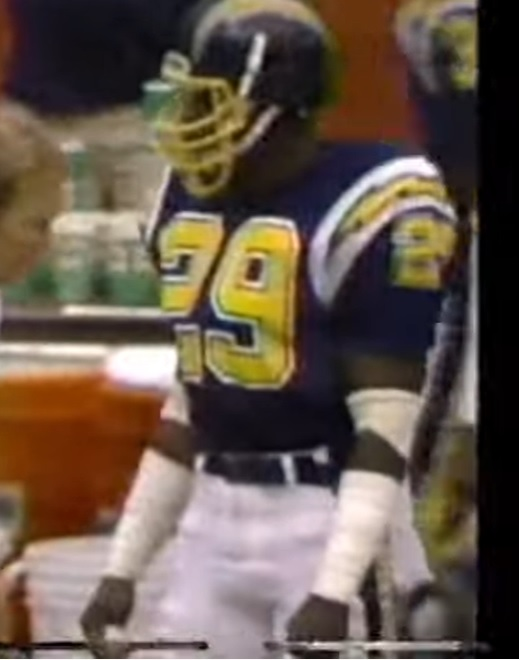

No. 29
- Position: Cornerback

Personal information
- Born: October 9, 1962 (age 64)
- Listed height: 5 ft 11 in (1.80 m)
- Listed weight: 196 lb (89 kg)

Career information
- High school: Adrian Wilcox (Santa Clara, California)
- College: Long Beach State
- NFL draft: 1985: 3rd round, 69th overall pick

Career history
- San Diego Chargers (1985–1987)

Awards and highlights
- PFWA All-Rookie Team (1985)

Career NFL statistics
- Fumble recoveries: 1
- Interceptions: 4
- Touchdowns: 1
- Stats at Pro Football Reference

John Hendy (born October 9, 1962) is a former professional American football player who played cornerback from 1985 to 1987 seasons for the San Diego Chargers of the National Football League (NFL). He was drafted by the San Diego Chargers in the 3rd round (69th overall) of the 1985 NFL draft.

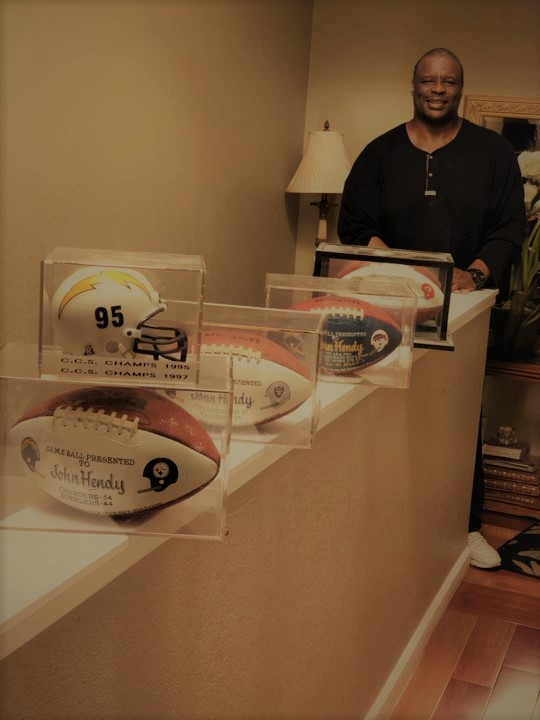

He was voted First-team NFL All-Rookie at cornerback in 1985. In week 14 Hendy was nominated for AFC Defensive Player of the Week for his two-interception game that included returning one 75 yards for a touchdown against the Buffalo Bills.

A 1984, AP All American at defensive back. Also 1st team All Conference (PCAA) at cornerback

He coached successfully at Wilcox High School in his hometown of Santa Clara, California, as an assistant for seven years helping earn the schools two CCS championships
