= Jeffery Dale =

American football player (born 1962)

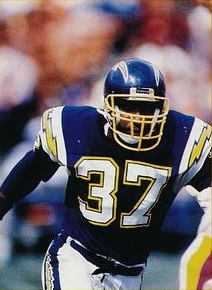
- Dale c. 1986

No. 37
- Position: Safety

Personal information
- Born: October 6, 1962 (age 64); Pineville, Louisiana, U.S.
- Listed height: 6 ft 3 in (1.91 m)
- Listed weight: 211 lb (96 kg)

Career information
- High school: Winnfield (LA)
- College: LSU
- NFL draft: 1985: 2nd round, 55th overall pick

Career history
- San Diego Chargers (1985–1986, 1988)

Awards and highlights
- Second-team All-SEC (1984)

Career NFL statistics
- Games played - started: 42 - 34
- Interceptions: 6
- Touchdowns: 1
- Stats at Pro Football Reference

Jeffery Dwayne Dale (born October 6, 1962) is an American former professional football player who was a safety for three seasons with the San Diego Chargers of the National Football League (NFL). He played college football for the LSU Tigers and was selected by the Chargers in the second round of the 1985 NFL draft with the 55th overall pick.

Dale was born October 6, 1962, in Pineville, Louisiana, and grew up in Winnfield. He was an All-American running back and safety for four years at Winnfield High School in Winnfield, Louisiana. He was then recruited as a safety and started at Louisiana State University. At 6 ft 4 in (1.93 m) and 215 pounds (98 kg), Dale was believed to be the largest free safety in the NFL during his time with the Chargers.

From 2001 - 2010, Dale was a director for Aramark, including at St. Jude's Children's Research Hospital in Memphis, Tennessee.

Dale received his Master's in Healthcare Administration from the University of Washington in 2011. He is currently a director at Harborview Medical Center in Seattle, WA.
