= Mark Fellows (American football) =

American football player (born 1963)

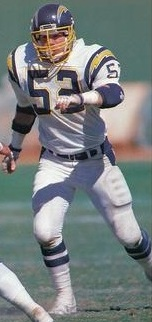
- Fellows c. 1985

No. 52
- Position: Linebacker

Personal information
- Born: February 26, 1963 (age 63); Billings, Montana, U.S.
- Listed height: 6 ft 1 in (1.85 m)
- Listed weight: 233 lb (106 kg)

Career information
- High school: Choteau (Choteau, Montana)
- College: Montana State
- NFL draft: 1985: 7th round, 196th overall pick

Career history
- San Diego Chargers (1985–1986)

Awards and highlights
- First-team Division I-AA All-American (1984); First-team All-Big Sky (1984)

Career NFL statistics
- Games played: 3
- Stats at Pro Football Reference

Mark Fellows (born February 26, 1963) is an American former professional football player who was a linebacker for the San Diego Chargers of the National Football League (NFL). He played college football for the Montana State Bobcats. He was selected by the Chargers in the seventh round of the 1985 NFL draft. He played for the Chargers in 1985 and 1986.

== College career ==
Fellows played for Montana State from 1981 to 1984. In his senior year, Fellows set a school record with 23 sacks, as the team went on to win the 1984 NCAA Division I-AA Football Championship Game. He was inducted into the Montana State Hall of Fame in 1998.

== Professional career ==
Fellows suffered a hip fracture early in the 1985 season, effectively ending his career.

== Personal life ==
Fellows's family moved to Choteau, Montana when he was in the fourth grade. After retiring from football, Fellows returned to Choteau. He and his brother, Mike, now run their family cattle ranch. Fellows and his wife, Pam, have three children: a boy, Quest, and two younger daughters, Libby and Stephanie.
