= 1983 San Diego Chargers season =

NFL team season

- Owner: Eugene V. Klein
- General manager: Johnny Sanders
- Head coach: Don Coryell
- Home stadium: Jack Murphy Stadium

Results
- Record: 6–10
- Division place: 5th AFC West
- Playoffs: Did not qualify
- All-Pros: None
- Pro Bowlers: 3: WR Wes Chandler; QB Dan Fouts; TE Kellen Winslow

The 1983 San Diego Chargers season was the franchise’s 14th season in the National Football League (NFL) and its 24th overall. The Chargers fell from their 1982 6–3 record to 6–10. It was their first losing season since 1976, to date the most points the Chargers have surrendered in a sixteen-game season, and began an era in the wilderness for the Chargers, who would not place higher than third in the AFC West, nor win more than eight games in a season, until 1992.

Despite San Diego’s disappointing 6–10 record, they led the NFL in passing yardage for the sixth consecutive season, which remains an NFL record.

This was the last season for the Chargers before Gene Klein, the team's owner since 1966, sold the team to Alex Spanos.

== Offseason ==
=== NFL draft ===
1983 San Diego Chargers draft
Round	Pick	Player	Position	College	Notes
1	5	Billy Ray Smith	Linebacker	Arkansas	
1	20	Gary Anderson *	Running back	Arkansas	(Note: Signed for Tampa Bay Bandits (USFL); joined the Chargers in 1985)
1	22	Gill Byrd *	Cornerback	San Jose State	
4	95	Danny Walters	Cornerback	Arkansas	
6	141	Trumaine Johnson	Wide receiver	Grambling State	(Note: Signed for Chicago Blitz (USFL); joined the Chargers in 1985)
7	192	Bill Elko	Nose tackle	Louisiana State	
8	202	Earnest Jackson *	Running back	Texas A&M	
9	245	Mike Green	Linebacker	Oklahoma State	
10	272	Bruce Mathison	Quarterback	Nebraska	
11	303	Tim Kearse	Wide receiver	San Jose State	
11	307	Tim Spencer	Running back	Ohio State	
12	314	Billy Blaylock	Defensive back	Tennessee Tech	
12	329	Chuck Ehin	Nose tackle	Brigham Young	
Made roster * Made at least one Pro Bowl during career

== Personnel ==
=== Staff ===
1983 San Diego Chargers staff
Front office: Owner & president – Gene Klein; General manager – Johnny Sanders; Assistant general manager – Tank Younger; Assistant to the president – Jack Teele; Business manager – Pat Curran; Chief scout – Aubrey "Red" Phillips; Scout – Ron Nay; Scout – Bob Sneddon; Head coaches: Head coach – Don Coryell; Assistant head coach – Ernie Zampese; Offensive coaches: Offensive coordinator – Dave Levy; Offensive backfield – Earnel Durden; Wide receivers – Al Saunders; Offensive assistant – Marv Braden	Defensive coaches: Defensive coordinator – Tom Bass; Defensive backfield – Jim Wagstaff; Defensive line – Jerry Smith; Linebackers – Chuck Weber; Defensive assistant – Birt Slater; Strength & conditioning: Head strength & conditioning – Phil Tyne

=== Roster ===
1983 San Diego Chargers roster
Quarterbacks (QB): 14 Dan Fouts; 11 Ed Luther; 12 Bruce Mathison; Running backs (RB): 21 James Brooks; 41 Earnest Jackson; 40 Jim Jodat; 46 Chuck Muncie; 47 Sherman Smith; Wide receivers (WR): 89 Wes Chandler; 82 Bobby Duckworth; 84 Hosea Fortune; 18 Charlie Joiner; Tight ends (TE): 88 Pete Holohan; 85 Eric Sievers; 80 Kellen Winslow	Offensive linemen (OL): 61 Don Brown T; 77 Sam Claphan T; 75 Andrew Gissinger T; 69 Derrel Gofourth G/C; 62 Don Macek C; 60 Dennis McKnight C/G; 66 Billy Shields T; 67 Ed White G; 63 Doug Wilkerson G; Defensive linemen (DL): 91 Rick Ackerman NT; 78 Chuck Ehin DE; 90 Bill Elko NT; 76 Keith Ferguson DE; 79 Gary Johnson DE; 68 Leroy Jones DE	Linebackers (LB): 50 Carlos Bradley OLB; 56 Larry Evans ILB; 58 Mike Green ILB; 57 Linden King OLB; 51 Woodrow Lowe OLB; 55 Derrie Nelson ILB; 52 Ray Preston OLB; 54 Billy Ray Smith ILB; 59 Cliff Thrift ILB; Defensive backs (DB): 22 Gill Byrd CB; 48 Tim Fox FS; 28 Ken Greene FS; 20 Reuben Henderson CB; 30 Bruce Laird SS; 23 Danny Walters CB; 45 Henry Williams CB; 49 Andre Young SS; Special teams (ST): 6 Rolf Benirschke K; 7 Maury Buford P	Reserve: 25 John Cappelletti RB (IR); 81 Roger Carr WR (IR); 43 Bob Gregor S (IR); 74 Louie Kelcher NT (Ret.); 64 Chuck Loewen G/T (IR); -- Warren Lyles NT (IR); 24 Miles McPherson CB (IR); 87 Dwight Scales WR (IR); Rookies in italics

== Preseason ==
Week	Date	Opponent	Result	Record	Venue	Attendance
1	August 6	at Los Angeles Rams	L 20–34	0–1	Anaheim Stadium	
2	August 13	Philadelphia Eagles	L 20–21	0–2	Jack Murphy Stadium	
3	August 20	San Francisco 49ers	W 24–7	1–2	Jack Murphy Stadium	
4	August 26	Los Angeles Rams	W 27–17	2–2	Jack Murphy Stadium	

== Regular season ==
=== Schedule ===
Week	Date	Opponent	Result	Record	Venue	Attendance	Recap
1	September 4	New York Jets	**L** 29–41	0–1	Jack Murphy Stadium	51,004	Recap
2	September 12	at **Kansas City Chiefs**	**W** 17–14	1–1	Arrowhead Stadium	62,150	Recap
3	September 18	at **Seattle Seahawks**	**L** 31–34	1–2	Kingdome	61,714	Recap
4	September 25	Cleveland Browns	**L** 24–30 (OT)	1–3	Jack Murphy Stadium	49,482	Recap
5	October 2	at New York Giants	**W** 41–34	2–3	Giants Stadium	73,892	Recap
6	October 9	**Seattle Seahawks**	**W** 28–21	3–3	Jack Murphy Stadium	49,132	Recap
7	October 16	at New England Patriots	**L** 21–37	3–4	Sullivan Stadium	59,016	Recap
8	October 23	at **Denver Broncos**	**L** 6–14	3–5	Mile High Stadium	74,581	Recap
9	October 31	Washington Redskins	**L** 24–27	3–6	Jack Murphy Stadium	46,114	Recap
10	November 6	at Pittsburgh Steelers	**L** 3–26	3–7	Three Rivers Stadium	58,191	Recap
11	November 13	Dallas Cowboys	**W** 24–23	4–7	Jack Murphy Stadium	46,192	Recap
12	November 20	at St. Louis Cardinals	**L** 14–44	4–8	Busch Memorial Stadium	40,644	Recap
13	November 27	**Denver Broncos**	**W** 31–7	5–8	Jack Murphy Stadium	43,650	Recap
14	December 1	**Los Angeles Raiders**	**L** 10–42	5–9	Jack Murphy Stadium	47,760	Recap
15	December 11	**Kansas City Chiefs**	**W** 41–38	6–9	Jack Murphy Stadium	35,510	Recap
16	December 18	at **Los Angeles Raiders**	**L** 14–30	6–10	Los Angeles Memorial Coliseum	57,325	Recap
Note: Intra-division opponents are in **bold** text.

=== Game summaries ===
==== Week 1: vs. New York Jets ====
Week One: New York Jets at San Diego Chargers – Game summary

Quarter	1	2	3	4	Total
**Jets**	0	13	7	21	**41**
Chargers	7	0	9	13	**29**

at Jack Murphy Stadium, San Diego, California

- Date: September 4
- Game time: 1:00 p.m. PDT
- Game weather: 75 °F (23.9 °C), relative humidity 73%, wind 9 miles per hour (14 km/h; 7.8 kn)
- Game attendance: 51,004
- Referee: Red Cashion
- TV announcers (NBC): Dick Enberg and Merlin Olsen
- Box score

Game information

**First quarter**

- SDG – Chuck Muncie 1-yard run (Rolf Benirschke kick), 0:00. Chargers 7–0. **Drive: 11 plays, 72 yards, 4:48.**

**Second quarter**

- NYJ – Wesley Walker 26-yard pass from Richard Todd (Pat Leahy kick), 12:34. Tied 7–7. **Drive: 8 plays, 74 yards, 2:26.**
- NYJ – Pat Leahy 32-yard field goal, 5:04. Jets 10–7. **Drive: 11 plays, 37 yards, 5:33.**
- NYJ – Pat Leahy 27-yard field goal, 0:14. Jets 13–7. **Drive: 11 plays, 40 yards, 4:12.**

**Third quarter**

- SDG – Rolf Benirschke 23-yard field goal, 11:41. Jets 13–10. **Drive: 9 plays, 85 yards, 3:19.**
- NYJ – Freeman McNeil 9-yard run (Pat Leahy kick), 4:24. Jets 20–10. **Drive: 14 plays, 70 yards, 7:17.**
- SDG – Chuck Muncie 2-yard run (kick failed), 1:01. Jets 20–16. **Drive: 6 plays, 80 yards, 3:23.**

**Fourth quarter**

- NYJ – Dwayne Crutchfield 1-yard run (Pat Leahy kick), 12:33. Jets 27–16. **Drive: 8 plays, 31 yards, 2:18.**
- SDG – Bobby Duckworth 29-yard pass from Dan Fouts (kick failed), 8:32. Jets 27–22. **Drive: 8 plays, 80 yards, 3:33.**
- NYJ – Freeman McNeil 18-yard pass from Richard Todd (Pat Leahy kick), 6:43. Jets 34–22. **Drive: 4 plays, 30 yards, 1:49.**
- SDG – Charlie Joiner 33-yard pass from Dan Fouts (Rolf Benirschke kick), 5:55. Jets 34–29. **Drive: 3 plays, 75 yards, 0:48.**
- NYJ – Mike Augustyniak 1-yard run (Pat Leahy kick), 1:57. Jets 41–29. **Drive: 2 plays, 8 yards, 0:26.**

**Top passers**

- NYJ – Richard Todd – 17/29, 160 yards, 2 TD, INT
- SDG – Dan Fouts – 20/36, 354 yards, 2 TD, 2 INT

**Top rushers**

- NYJ – Freeman McNeil – 23 rushes, 120 yards, TD
- SDG – James Brooks – 7 rushes, 76 yards

**Top receivers**

- NYJ – Wesley Walker – 8 receptions, 83 yards, TD
- SDG – Bobby Duckworth – 4 receptions, 110 yards, TD

New York's rushing attack controlled the game as San Diego opened their season with a loss. Benirschke missed a 46-yard field goal on San Diego's opening drive, but they took the lead with a touchdown late in the first quarter. They converted three 3rd downs, with Duckworth's juggling 32-yard catch on 3rd and 10 from the Jets 33 followed immediately by Muncie's scoring run. New York responded with thirteen points on their next three drives, while San Diego went three-and-out once and lost a fumble at midfield through Joiner. The Jets led 13–7 at halftime.

Early in the second half, Brooks broke away around left end for a 61-yard run on 3rd and 1 from the San Diego 34-yard line before being caught at the New York 5. San Diego failed to advance further and took a field goal. New York converted a 4th down on their next drive, which took seven minutes and ended with a touchdown. Fouts had back-to-back 22-yard completions to Winslow and Joiner as the Chargers quickly responded with Muncie's second touchdown. New York were soon forced to punt, but Brooks fumbled the return and the Jets recovered; they converted the turnover into a 1-yard touchdown run on 4th and goal. Fouts completed all five of his passes as the Chargers again responded, this time with Duckworth's 29-yard touchdown catch on 3rd and 15. The ensuing kickoff had to be retaken as the television network were not broadcasting, and Kirk Springs returned the second kick 64 yards to set up another touchdown. San Diego needed only three Fouts passes to produce their third consecutive touchdown drive: 21-yard completions to Chandler and Duckworth, then Joiner's 33-yard touchdown. The Jets punted, giving San Diego's offense a chance to give their team the lead. They took over at their own 5-yard line with under three minutes left, and Fouts' second pass was intercepted. New York scored the clinching touchdown, and Fouts was intercepted again before the game finished.

The Jets' runners accounted for a combined 51 carries, 251 yards and 3 touchdowns; they converted four short 4th downs and New York kept possession of the ball for 36:31. San Diego had more total offense yardage (488 to 391), but committed four of the game's five turnovers.

==== Week 2: at Kansas City Chiefs ====
Week Two: San Diego Chargers at Kansas City Chiefs – Game summary

Quarter	1	2	3	4	Total
**Chargers**	3	0	7	7	**17**
Chiefs	0	7	0	7	**14**

at Arrowhead Stadium, Kansas City, Missouri

- Date: September 12
- Game time: 8:00 p.m. CDT
- Game weather: 69 °F (20.6 °C), relative humidity 75%, wind 12 miles per hour (19 km/h; 10 kn)
- Game attendance: 62,150
- Referee: Jerry Seeman
- TV announcers (ABC): Frank Gifford, Don Meredith and Howard Cosell
- Box score

Game information

**First quarter**

- SDG – Rolf Benirschke 49-yard field goal, 8:19. Chargers 3–0. **Drive: 4 plays, 2 yards, 1:37.**

**Second quarter**

- KAN – Anthony Hancock 45-yard pass from Bill Kenney (Nick Lowery kick), 3:00. Chiefs 7–3. **Drive: 7 plays, 97 yards, 2:46.**

**Third quarter**

- SDG – Chuck Muncie 10-yard run (Rolf Benirschke kick), 6:34. Chargers 10–7. **Drive: 15 plays, 96 yards, 8:26.**

**Fourth quarter**

- KAN – Henry Marshall 48-yard pass from Carlos Carson (Nick Lowery kick), 3:07. Chiefs 14–10. **Drive: 9 plays, 80 yards, 5:31.**
- SDG – Wes Chandler 12-yard pass from Dan Fouts (Rolf Benirschke kick), 1:45. Chargers 17–14. **Drive: 5 plays, 80 yards, 1:22.**

**Top passers**

- SDG – Dan Fouts – 17/25, 259 yards, TD, INT
- KAN – Bill Kenney – 23/30, 188 yards, TD, INT

**Top rushers**

- SDG – Chuck Muncie – 27 rushes, 110 yards, TD
- KAN – Billy Jackson – 10 rushes, 20 yards

**Top receivers**

- SDG – Wes Chandler – 5 receptions, 77 yards, TD
- KAN – Anthony Hancock – 6 receptions, 73 yards, TD

Chandler's late touchdown gave the Chargers their first win. Tim Fox's interception five minutes into the game set up his offense at the Kansas City 35-yard line; they could only move the ball two yards, but Benirschke made a 51-yard kick to put them ahead. The Chargers had another good scoring chance later in the opening quarter, but Muncie lost a fumble on 1st and 10 from the Chiefs 16. In the 2nd quarter they moved from their own 36 to a 4th and 1 at the Chiefs 2, but Brooks was stopped for no gain and they again came away with no points. Kansas City then drove 97 yards, converting a 3rd and 17 and taking the lead through Anthony Hancock's touchdown on the next play. A Fouts pass was intercepted but then fumbled back with a minute left in the half, allowing a Benirschke field goal try. He missed wide left from 46 yards out and the Chiefs led 7–3 at the break.

Earnest Jackson misplayed the opening kickoff of the second half and was tackled at his own 4-yard line. San Diego's offense put together a 15-play, 96-yard drive, with Muncie producing a air of 3rd-down conversions and scoring on the second of them. The Chargers' next drive covered 81 yards on 14 plays, but ended with another missed scoring opportunity: on 3rd and goal from the 2, Muncie gained one yard before fumbling into the end zone, where Kansas City recovered. The Chiefs drove 80 yards the other way and retook the lead on a trick play, with wide receiver Carlos Carson throwing the touchdown. San Diego took over on their own 20 with three minutes left, but needed only five plays to retake the lead. Fouts completed all four of his passes for 76 yards, including a 36-yard gain by Brooks on a screen pass and Chandler's winning catch in the end zone. Green stopped a Chiefs run for no gain on 4th and 1 with a minute to play, and San Diego ran out the clock.

The Chargers had the ball in Chiefs territory on all eleven of their drives. San Diego's offense had an uncharacteristic focus on the run, with Muncie rushing 27 times for 110 yards and Brooks 23 times for 86 yards; they had 51 rushing plays in total and only 26 passes.

==== Week 3: at Seattle Seahawks ====
Week Three: San Diego Chargers at Seattle Seahawks – Game summary

Quarter	1	2	3	4	Total
Chargers	7	3	0	21	**31**
**Seahawks**	14	3	10	7	**34**

at Kingdome, Seattle, Washington

- Date: September 18
- Game time: 1:00 p.m. PDT
- Game weather: N/A (game played indoors)
- Game attendance: 61,714
- Referee: Ben Dreith
- TV announcers (NBC): Dick Enberg and Merlin Olsen
- Box score

Game information

**First quarter**

- SEA – Dan Doornink 2-yard run (Norm Johnson kick), 8:43. Seahawks 7–0. **Drive: 12 plays, 80 yards, 6:17.**
- SDG – Charlie Joiner 25-yard pass from Dan Fouts (Rolf Benirschke kick), 6:29. Tied 7–7. **Drive: 5 plays, 74 yards, 1:28.**
- SEA – Steve Largent 5-yard pass from Jim Zorn (Norm Johnson kick), 1:38. Seahawks 14–7. **Drive: 4 plays, 23 yards, 1:37.**

**Second quarter**

- SEA – Norm Johnson 33-yard field goal, 2:00. Seahawks 17–7. **Drive: 5 plays, 22 yards, 1:00.**
- SDG – Rolf Benirschke 26-yard field goal, 0:32. Seahawks 17–10. **Drive: 9 plays, 72 yards, 1:28.**

**Third quarter**

- SEA – Norm Johnson 43-yard field goal, 10:52. Seahawks 20–10. **Drive: 7 plays, 26 yards, 3:07.**
- SEA – Paul Moyer 19-yard interception return (Norm Johnson kick), 9:56. Seahawks 27–10.

**Fourth quarter**

- SDG – Eric Sievers 26-yard pass from Dan Fouts (Rolf Benirschke kick), 13:27. Seahawks 27–17. **Drive: 8 plays, 65 yards, 2:33.**
- SEA – Steve Largent 41-yard pass from Jim Zorn (Norm Johnson kick), 9:00. Seahawks 34–17. **Drive: 9 plays, 77 yards, 4:27.**
- SDG – Bobby Duckworth 44-yard pass from Dan Fouts (Rolf Benirschke kick), 7:29. Seahawks 34–24. **Drive: 6 plays, 83 yards, 1:31.**
- SDG – Eric Sievers 27-yard pass from Dan Fouts (Rolf Benirschke kick), 4:16. Seahawks 34–31. **Drive: 1 play, 27 yards, 0:06.**

**Top passers**

- SDG – Dan Fouts – 21/41, 338 yards, 4 TD, 3 INT
- SEA – Jim Zorn – 15/24, 172 yards, 2 TD, INT

**Top rushers**

- SDG – Chuck Muncie – 13 rushes, 64 yards
- SEA – Curt Warner – 22 rushes, 109 yards

**Top receivers**

- SDG – Eric Sievers – 6 receptions, 115 yards, 2 TD
- SEA – Steve Largent – 6 receptions, 116 yards, 2 TD

Seattle beat the Chargers by dominating time of possession and surviving a late rally. Seattle scored a touchdown on the game's opening possession, and were threatening again when Fox intercepted an overthrown Jim Zorn pass at the Chargers 26-yard line. Fouts passed on the next five plays, completing four of them for 76 yards; a well-covered Joiner made a juggling catch for the touchdown. Fouts was intercepted twice through the rest of the first half, leading to ten Seattle points. Late in the 2nd quarter, Joiner had a 24-yard catch and also drew a further 15 yards for a late hit. San Diego reached a first and goal at the 8, but had to settle for a field goal and trailed 17–10 at halftime.

The Seahawks extended their lead in the 3rd quarter through a field goal and Paul Moyer's interception and return of a tipped Fouts pass. On the following drive Chandler's 33-yard catch to the Seattle 14 was nullified because Fouts had crossed the line of scrimmage before throwing the ball, forcing the Chargers to punt. Seattle lost a fumble soon afterwards, but retained possession when Johnson was ruled to have impeded a Seahawk attempting to make a recovery. Johnson himself recovered another fumble later in the drive, giving San Diego possession at their own 35. They drove from there to score on Sievers' 26-yard catch, but Seattle came straight back with Zorn's touchdown pass to Steve Largent and led by seventeen points with under nine minutes to play. San Diego needed barely a minute to begin their comeback via Duckworth's 44-yard touchdown on a 3rd and 10. Three minutes later, Linden King knocked the ball from Zorn's hands and Rick Ackerman recovered. Fouts immediately found Sievers open near the goal line to reduce the deficit to three points. San Diego were however unable to get the ball back on offense, as Seattle converted a pair of short third down situations and ran out the final four minutes of the game.

San Diego possessed the ball for only 20:56 as Seattle rushed 56 times for 206 yards and a touchdown. The Chargers outgained Seattle by 431 yards to 368.

==== Week 4: vs. Cleveland Browns ====
Week Four: Cleveland Browns at San Diego Chargers – Game summary

Quarter	1	2	3	4	OT	Total
**Browns**	7	7	7	3	6	**30**
Chargers	3	7	14	0	0	**24**

at Jack Murphy Stadium, San Diego, California

- Date: September 25
- Game time: 1:00 p.m. PDT
- Game weather: 73 °F (22.8 °C), relative humidity 69%, wind 9 miles per hour (14 km/h; 7.8 kn)
- Game attendance: 49,482
- Referee: Bob Frederic
- TV announcers (NBC): Jay Randolph and Bob Chandler
- Box score

Game information

**First quarter**

- SDG – Rolf Benirschke 37-yard field goal, 9:59. Chargers 3–0. **Drive: 12 plays, 56 yards, 5:01.**
- CLE – Mike Pruitt 1-yard run (Matt Bahr kick), 0:46. Browns 7–3. **Drive: 14 plays, 81 yards, 9:13.**

**Second quarter**

- CLE – Ozzie Newsome 11-yard pass from Brian Sipe (Matt Bahr kick), 5:54. Browns 14–3. **Drive: 11 plays, 77 yards, 6:35.**
- SDG – Eric Sievers 15-yard pass from Dan Fouts (Rolf Benirschke kick), 1:58. Browns 14–10. **Drive: 8 plays, 78 yards, 3:56.**

**Third quarter**

- CLE – Bobby Jones 27-yard pass from Brian Sipe (Matt Bahr kick), 0:14. Browns 21–10. **Drive: 11 plays, 40 yards, 4:12.**
- SDG – Wes Chandler 25-yard pass from Dan Fouts (Rolf Benirschke kick), 11:41. Browns 21–17. **Drive: 9 plays, 85 yards, 3:19.**
- SDG – Wes Chandler 34-yard pass from Dan Fouts (Rolf Benirschke kick), 1:01. Chargers 24–21. **Drive: 6 plays, 80 yards, 3:23.**

**Fourth quarter**

- CLE – Matt Bahr 32-yard field goal, 12:33. Tied 24–24. **Drive: 8 plays, 31 yards, 2:18.**

**Overtime**

- CLE – Harry Holt 48-yard pass from Brian Sipe, 12:33. Browns 30–24. **Drive: 8 plays, 31 yards, 2:18.**

**Top passers**

- CLE – Brian Sipe – 27/44, 327 yards, 3 TD
- SDG – Dan Fouts – 24/38, 351 yards, 3 TD

**Top rushers**

- CLE – Mike Pruitt – 24 rushes, 63 yards, TD
- SDG – Chuck Muncie – 18 rushes, 60 yards

**Top receivers**

- CLE – Dave Logan – 8 receptions, 121 yards
- SDG – Wes Chandler – 6 receptions, 134 yards, 2 TD

San Diego slipped to 1–3 with an overtime defeat. There were only six possessions in the first half. The Chargers attempted field goals at the end of their first two drives, with Benirschke converting from 37 yards and missing from 41; Cleveland responded with a pair of touchdown drives that consumed over fifteen minutes. San Diego scored on their next drive, Duckworth drawing a 31-yard pass interference penalty and Fouts finding Sievers in the end zone on 3rd and 10 from the 15. Cleveland drove from their own 35 to the Chargers 1-yard line with five seconds left in the half. They opted to run another play, but a pass from Brian Sipe to Ozzie Newsome fell incomplete with Green on the coverage, and time ran out with the Browns up 14–10.

Cleveland needed only six plays to extend their lead in the second half but San Diego came straight back, with Chandler gaining 29 yards on a 3rd and 3 before scoring in tight coverage after the ball was tipped in the air at the goal line. Cleveland were then forced to punt (the first time either side had done so), and San Diego took over at their own 47. Muncie caught a 16-yard pass, then fumbled after a 3-yard run with Don Macek recovering to preserve possession. Fouts found Chandler for his second touchdown on the next play. Winslow had catches of 24 and 28 yards on the next two drives, each one leading to a field goal try: Benirschke was short from 49 yards, then had a 34-yarder blocked. The missed opportunities proved important, as Cleveland forced San Diego to punt from their own 10-yard line with two minutes left, then put together a 28-yard drive that ended with a game-tying field goal with 18 seconds left; Andre Young broke up a potential touchdown pass one play before the kick.

The game went into overtime, where Cleveland won the coin toss, received the ball and scored quickly. Sipe converted a 3rd and 7 with a 12-yard pass, then threw the 48-yard game-winner on the next play.

Benirschke was 1 of 4 on field goal tries. San Diego had two 100-yard receivers: Chandler caught 6 passes for 134 yards and two touchdowns, while Winslow caught 8 for 108.

==== Week 5: at New York Giants ====
Week Five: San Diego Chargers at New York Giants – Game summary

Quarter	1	2	3	4	Total
**Chargers**	13	14	7	7	**41**
Giants	0	17	7	10	**34**

at Giants Stadium, East Rutherford, New Jersey

- Date: October 2
- Game time: 4:00 p.m. EDT
- Game weather: 66 °F (18.9 °C), relative humidity 86%, wind 8 miles per hour (13 km/h; 7.0 kn)
- Game attendance: 73,892
- Referee: Gene Barth
- TV announcers (NBC): Dick Enberg and Merlin Olsen
- Box Score

Game information

**First quarter**

- SDG – Rolf Benirschke 40-yard field goal, 12:29. Chargers 3–0. **Drive: 8 plays, 46 yards, 2:31.**
- SDG – Rolf Benirschke 37-yard field goal, 7:33. Chargers 6–0. **Drive: 8 plays, 21 yards, 2:56.**
- SDG – Chuck Muncie 1-yard run (Rolf Benirschke kick), 5:45. Chargers 13–0. **Drive: 3 plays, 1 yard, 0:58.**

**Second quarter**

- NYG – Ali Haji-Sheikh 20-yard field goal, 8:35. Chargers 13–3. **Drive: 11 plays, 30 yards, 4:15.**
- SDG – Charlie Joiner 13-yard pass from Dan Fouts (Rolf Benirschke kick), 3:16. Chargers 20–3. **Drive: 11 plays, 90 yards, 5:19.**
- NYG – Earnest Gray 51-yard pass from Scott Brunner (Ali Haji-Sheikh kick), 1:50. Chargers 20–10. **Drive: 4 plays, 82 yards, 1:26.**
- SDG – Kellen Winslow 16-yard pass from Dan Fouts (Rolf Benirschke kick), 0:42. Chargers 27–10. **Drive: 5 plays, 71 yards, 1:08.**
- NYG – Danny Pittman 40-yard pass from Scott Brunner (Ali Haji-Sheikh kick), 0:06. Chargers 27–17. **Drive: 3 plays, 67 yards, 0:36.**

**Third quarter**

- NYG – Rob Carpenter 1-yard run (Ali Haji-Sheikh kick), 8:49. Chargers 27–24. **Drive: 13 plays, 73 yards, 6:11.**
- SDG – Chuck Muncie 2-yard run (Rolf Benirschke kick), 1:10. Chargers 34–24. **Drive: 8 plays, 66 yards, 3:21.**

**Fourth quarter**

- NYG – Tom Mullady 21-yard pass from Scott Brunner (Ali Haji-Sheikh kick), 10:20. Chargers 34–31. **Drive: 10 plays, 85 yards, 5:50.**
- NYG – Ali Haji-Sheikh 37-yard field goal, 6:53. Tied 34–34. **Drive: 4 plays, 7 yards, 0:51.**
- SDG – Chuck Muncie 34-yard run (Rolf Benirschke kick), 4:32. Chargers 41–34. **Drive: 5 plays, 77 yards, 2:21.**

**Passing**

- SDG – Dan Fouts – 15/28, 215 yards, 2 TD, 2 INT
- NYG – Scott Brunner – 31/51, 395 yards, 3 TD, INT

**Rushing**

- SDG – Chuck Muncie – 17 carries, 87 yards, 3 TD
- NYG – Rob Carpenter – 18 carries, 35 yards, TD

**Receiving**

- SDG – Kellen Winslow – 8 receptions, 99 yards, TD
- NYG – Earnest Gray – 9 receptions, 159 yards, TD

Muncie's touchdown and Smith's late fumble recovery saved the Chargers after they lost a seventeen point lead. Benirschke made a field goal on the game's opening drive, then added another after King's fumble recovery at the New York 40-yard line. Woodrow Lowe soon forced another fumble, which Leroy Jones recovered at the New York 16 and returned to the 1-yard line. From there, Muncie ran three times in a row, scoring on the third attempt. Keith Ferguson soon became the third Chargers to recover a fumble in the opening quarter, but Muncie fumbled the ball back to New York two plays later. Fouts was intercepted in his own territory in the 2nd quarter, leading to a Giants field goal. He began the next drive with completions of 22 and 15 yards to Sievers, and San Diego eventually reached a 4th and 2 at the New York 17. They converted with a fake field goal, holder Luther passing to Sherman Smith for 4 yards; Fouts and Joiner connected for a touchdown on the next play. Giants quarterback Scott Brunner led a quick drive in response, ending with his first touchdown pass of the game. Fouts came back with five consecutive completions for 71 yards and a touchdown, caught by Winslow with 42 seconds left. That was enough time for New York to score again, with San Diego's defensive backs losing track of Danny Pittman for a 40-yard touchdown with 6 seconds left. Four touchdowns had been scored in the final 3:16 of the first half, and the Chargers led 27–17.

New York continued their recovery in the second half. Young gave up a 32-yard pass interference penalty on a 3rd and 11 from San Diego's 34, and the Giants eventually scored on 4th and goal. Fouts was intercepted by Lawrence Taylor on the next play, setting New York up at the Chargers 17. They appeared to have tied the game with a field goal, but Byrd was flagged for running into the kicker, giving up a 1st and goal on the 7-yard line. The penalty benefitted San Diego when Brunner fumbled the next snap and Bill Elko recovered. The teams exchanged punts before Luther came in for an injured Fouts. He fumbled his second snap (Ed White recovered to maintain possession) but then converted two 3rd downs on the drive to Muncie's second touchdown. New York responded with Brunner's third touchdown pass, then intercepted Luther and tied the game with a field goal. Luther came back with a 32-yard pass to Joiner to open the next drive. Four plays later, Muncie swept left behind a key block from White and broke away for a 34-yard touchdown. On the next play, Byrd made his first career interception on a deep pass. New York forced a punt and began a final drive at their own 35 with three minutes left. Byrd dropped a second interception, then deflected an end zone pass after the Giants reached San Diego's 12. After another incompletion, Brunner fumbled the ball while attempting to pass. Smith recovered with 52 seconds left, and the Chargers ran out the clock.

San Diego forced six of the game's ten turnovers. They recovered all five times that the Giants fumbled, and also recovered two of their own three fumbles.

==== Week 6: vs. Seattle Seahawks ====
Week Six: Seattle Seahawks at San Diego Chargers – Game summary

Quarter	1	2	3	4	Total
Seahawks	7	14	0	0	**21**
**Chargers**	0	7	7	14	**28**

at Jack Murphy Stadium, San Diego, California

- Date: October 9
- Game time: 1:00 p.m. PDT
- Game weather: 73 °F (22.8 °C), relative humidity 76%, wind 12 miles per hour (19 km/h; 10 kn)
- Game attendance: 49,132
- Referee: Tom Dooley
- TV announcers (NBC): Jay Randolph and Reggie Rucker
- Box score

Game information

**First quarter**

- SEA – Harold Jackson 5-yard pass from Jim Zorn (Norm Johnson kick), 3:31. Seahawks 7–0. **Drive: 7 plays, 45 yards.**

**Second quarter**

- SEA – Curt Warner 2-yard run (Norm Johnson kick), 10:21. Seahawks 14–0. **Drive: 11 plays, 60 yards, 5:37.**
- SEA – Curt Warner 2-yard run (Norm Johnson kick), 1:50. Seahawks 21–0. **Drive: 8 plays, 67 yards, 3:15.**
- SDG – Kellen Winslow 12-yard pass from Ed Luther (Rolf Benirschke kick), 0:34. Seahawks 21–7. **Drive: 7 plays, 82 yards, 1:16.**

**Third quarter**

- SDG – Bobby Duckworth 59-yard pass from Dan Fouts (Rolf Benirschke kick), 13:17. Seahawks 21–14. **Drive: 7 plays, 70 yards, 1:43.**

**Fourth quarter**

- SDG – Chuck Muncie 1-yard run (Rolf Benirschke kick), 14:20. Tied 21–21. **Drive: 13 plays, 87 yards, 7:13.**
- SDG – Andre Young 40-yard interception return (Rolf Benirschke kick), 2:04. Chargers 28–21.

**Top passers**

- SEA – Jim Zorn – 25/41, 295 yards, TD, INT
- SDG – Dan Fouts – 28/36, 331 yards, TD, 2 INT

**Top rushers**

- SEA – Curt Warner – 19 rushes, 73 yards, 2 TD
- SDG – Chuck Muncie – 18 rushes, 76 yards, TD

**Top receivers**

- SEA – Charle Young – 7 receptions, 140 yards
- SDG – Wes Chandler – 8 receptions, 83 yards

Young's late interception return completed a franchise record 21-point comeback. Seattle threatened on their first drive, but were stopped for no gain on 4th and 1 from the 19-yard line. Later, a Seattle punt touched Bruce Laird and the Seahawks recovered, leading to the game's first touchdown. San Diego drove to a 1st and 10 at the Seattle 23, but Winslow fumbled after a short pass; Seattle again recovered, and again drove for a touchdown. The Chargers drove to the Seahawks 19- and 43-yard lines on their next two possessions, but Fouts was intercepted both times, with Seattle scoring their third touchdown after the second of these. San Diego were able to respond immediately. Fouts began the drive with back-to-back completions of 20 yards to Muncie and 21 yards to Joiner. After a personal foul penalty on Seattle nullified an 11-yard sack, Fouts found Sievers for 28 yards but left the game with an injury. Luther and Winslow combined for the touchdown two plays later, reducing the halftime deficit to 21–7.

Brooks converted a 4th and inches early in the second half. Fouts had returned to the game, and found Duckworth behind the defense for a 59-yard touchdown on the next play. San Diego next went three-and-out, but then made it three touchdowns from four possessions with an 87-yard drive. Fouts converted a 3rd and 9 with an 11-yard pass to Joiner and a 3rd and 13 with a 22-yarder to Chandler, before Muncie tied the score early in the final quarter. Ken Greene recovered a fumble at the Seattle 36 with under six minutes left, but Muncie fumbled it back four plays later. The Seahawks moved to a 2nd and 13 from their own 32 before Young intercepted a Zorn pass near the right sideline and scored easily with 2:04 to play. Seattle reached their own 47-yard line on their final drive, but were pushed back by two penalties and a Ferguson sack, with Zorn eventually throwing incomplete on 4th and 38.

The comeback was matched by the Chargers in 2006 and 2014, but has not been exceeded as of 2024. They won despite committing five of the game's seven turnovers, and possessing the ball for under 25 minutes.

==== Week 7: at New England Patriots ====
Week Seven: San Diego Chargers at New England Patriots – Game summary

Quarter	1	2	3	4	Total
Chargers	7	14	0	0	**21**
**Patriots**	3	7	3	24	**37**

at Sullivan Stadium, Foxborough, Massachusetts

- Date: October 16
- Game time: 1:00 p.m. EDT
- Game weather: 50 °F (10 °C), relative humidity 51%, wind 15 miles per hour (24 km/h; 13 kn)
- Game attendance: 59,016
- Referee: Fred Wyant
- TV announcers (NBC): Phil Stone, Gene Washington
- Box score

Game information

**First quarter**

- SDG – James Brooks 1-yard run (Rolf Benirschke kick), 4:19. Chargers 7–0. **Drive: 8 plays, 64 yards, 5:37.**
- NE – Fred Steinfort 35-yard field goal, 0:35. Chargers 7–3. **Drive: 4 plays, 5 yards, 1:25.**

**Second quarter**

- SDG – Bobby Duckworth 40-yard pass from Dan Fouts (Rolf Benirschke kick), 14:43. Chargers 14–3. **Drive: 3 plays, 77 yards, 0:52.**
- NE – Tony Collins 7-yard run (Fred Steinfort kick), 10:31. Chargers 14–10. **Drive: 7 plays, 74 yards, 4:12.**
- SDG – James Brooks 1-yard run (Rolf Benirschke kick), 0:36. Chargers 21–10. **Drive: 9 plays, 52 yards, 4:55.**

**Third quarter**

- NE – Fred Steinfort 20-yard field goal, 9:38. Chargers 21–13. **Drive: 12 plays, 54 yards, 4:25.**

**Fourth quarter**

- NE – Fred Steinfort 32-yard field goal, 10:53. Chargers 21–16. **Drive: 12 plays, 84 yards, 6:05.**
- NE – Mark van Eeghen 1-yard run (Fred Steinfort kick), 9:56. Patriots 23–21. **Drive: 2 plays, 1 yard, 0:32.**
- NE – Tony Collins 10-yard run (Fred Steinfort kick), 2:23. Patriots 30–21. **Drive: 9 plays, 56 yards, 5:08.**
- NE – Steve Grogan 1-yard run (Fred Steinfort kick), 0:23. Patriots 37–21. **Drive: 5 plays, 25 yards, 1:25.**

**Top passers**

- SDG – Dan Fouts – 25/37, 357 yards, TD, INT
- NE – Steve Grogan – 17/33, 180 yards

**Top rushers**

- SDG – James Brooks – 24 rushes, 72 yards, 2 TD
- NE – Tony Collins – 19 rushes, 94 yards, 2 TD

**Top receivers**

- SDG – Kellen Winslow – 6 receptions, 94 yards
- NE – Cedric Jones – 2 receptions, 44 yards

San Diego collapsed in the 4th quarter after being stopped on a key 4th down attempt. King's sack forced New England to punt on their opening possession, and the Chargers drove 64 yards to Brooks' opening touchdown without having to convert a 3rd down. Brooks fumbled in his own territory later in the 1st quarter, setting up a Patriots field goal. San Diego responded by covering 77 yards with three Fouts passes: 11 yards to Duckworth, 26 to Brooks, and 40 to Duckworth again for the touchdown. New England drew back within four points on their next drive, then each side punted once before San Diego scored again. Winslow converted a 3rd and 8 on the drive, and Brooks' second touchdown came on 3rd and goal from the 1-yard line. The Chargers led 21–10 at halftime.

Fouts was intercepted three plays into the second half, leading to a New England field goal. The Chargers gained a first down at the Patriots 40, but Fouts fumbled the snap and New England recovered. After forcing a punt, San Diego drove from their own 16 to a 4th and inches from the Patriots 1-yard line, with Fouts converting three 3rd downs along the way. However, he was stopped just short on a quarterback sneak with two minutes left in the 3rd quarter, sparking a New England comeback. The Patriots drove 84 yards for a field goal, then took the lead two plays after another Brooks fumble. The next two Chargers drives ended with a punt and a turnover on downs, with New England responding with touchdowns both times.

The Chargers outgained New England by 427 yards to 327, but committed all four of the game's turnovers. It was San Diego's eleventh consecutive regular season game gaining 400 or more yards, still a record as of 2024.

==== Week 8: at Denver Broncos ====
Week Seven: San Diego Chargers at Denver Broncos – Game summary

Quarter	1	2	3	4	Total
Chargers	0	3	3	0	**6**
**Broncos**	0	0	0	14	**14**

at Mile High Stadium, Denver, Colorado

- Date: October 23
- Game time: 2:00 p.m. MDT
- Game weather: 56 °F (13.3 °C), relative humidity 25%, wind 6 miles per hour (9.7 km/h; 5.2 kn)
- Game attendance: 74,581
- Referee: Jim Tunney
- TV announcers (NBC): Marv Albert and John Brodie
- Box score

Game information

**First quarter**

- No scoring plays.

**Second quarter**

- SDG – Rolf Benirschke 29-yard field goal, 0:23. Chargers 3–0. **Drive: 4 plays, 0 yards, 0:19.**

**Third quarter**

- SDG – Rolf Benirschke 30-yard field goal, 1:49. Chargers 6–0. **Drive: 9 plays, 40 yards, 4:14.**

**Fourth quarter**

- DEN – Rick Upchurch 30-yard pass from Steve DeBerg (Rich Karlis kick), 12:32. Broncos 7–6. **Drive: 8 plays, 80 yards, 4:17.**
- DEN – Dave Preston 2-yard run (Rich Karlis kick), 1:42. Broncos 14–6. **Drive: 11 plays, 47 yards, 3:18.**

**Top passers**

- SDG – Ed Luther – 22/48, 193 yards, 3 INT
- DEN – Steve DeBerg – 14/26, 175 yards, TD, INT

**Top rushers**

- SDG – Sherman Smith – 10 rushes, 57 yards
- DEN – Dave Preston – 22 rushes, 99 yards, TD

**Top receivers**

- SDG – Kellen Winslow – 6 receptions, 88 yards
- DEN – Dave Preston – 5 receptions, 49 yards

San Diego failed to reached the end zone as Luther lost his first career start. With Fouts and Muncie both out injured, San Diego began the game with punts on their first three possessions. Late in the 1st quarter, Carlos Bradley recovered a Denver fumble near midfield and the Chargers crossed into Broncos territory for the first time. They reached the 34-yard line before Luther threw his first interception. On their next possession the Chargers drove from their own 8-yard line to the Denver 34 with Luther converting three 3rd downs, but Benirschke was short on a 43-yard kick. Denver then produced their longest drive of the half, reaching the Chargers 24 before Young sacked Steve DeBerg and Johnson recovered. After a San Diego punt, Johnson produced his own sack and forced fumble, which Ackerman recovered at the Denver 11-yard line. Luther threw three incompletions, and Benirschke's 29-yard kick put the Chargers up 3–0 at the interval.

The Chargers' first two possessions of the second half reached Denver's 33-yard line, from where Luther was intercepted, and 12-yard line, where they stalled and Benirschke kicked his second field goal. Denver's first touchdown came on the next possession with DeBerg's touchdown pass on 3rd and 7. The Chargers went three-and-out, and Denver were soon threatening to score again as they reached a 3rd and 3 at the San Diego 9 before being stopped by Green's interception. Following another three-and-out, the Broncos drove 47 yards for the clinching touchdown, and Luther was intercepted again in the final seconds.

It was first time Fouts had missed a game since week 13, 1978, and the first time San Diego failed to score a touchdown since week 6, 1979 (also at Denver). The Chargers were hampered by 14 penalties for 100 yards.

==== Week 9: vs. Washington Redskins ====
Week Nine: Washington Redskins at San Diego Chargers – Game summary

Quarter	1	2	3	4	Total
**Redskins**	7	3	7	10	**27**
Chargers	7	0	0	17	**24**

at Jack Murphy Stadium, San Diego, California

- Date: October 31
- Game time: 6:00 p.m. PST
- Game weather: 71 °F (21.7 °C), relative humidity 73%, wind 9 miles per hour (14 km/h; 7.8 kn)
- Game attendance: 46,114
- Referee: Fred Silva
- TV announcers (NBC): Frank Gifford, Don Meredith and Howard Cosell
- Box score

Game information

**First quarter**

- WAS – Virgil Seay 39-yard pass from Joe Theismann (Mark Moseley kick), 13:14. Seahawks 7–0. **Drive: 4 plays, 55 yards, 1:46.**
- SDG – Chuck Muncie 5-yard run (Rolf Benirschke kick), 3:23. Tied 21–21. **Drive: 11 plays, 74 yards, 3:50.**

**Second quarter**

- WAS – Mark Moseley 43-yard field goal, 0:05. Seahawks 14–0. **Drive: 7 plays, 52 yards, 0:44.**

**Third quarter**

- WAS – John Riggins 2-yard run (Mark Moseley kick), 6:03. Seahawks 14–0. **Drive: 12 plays, 93 yards, 5:45.**

**Fourth quarter**

- WAS – John Riggins 1-yard run (Mark Moseley kick), 14:46. Seahawks 14–0. **Drive: 12 plays, 58 yards, 4:51.**
- SDG – Pete Holohan 23-yard pass from Ed Luther (Rolf Benirschke kick), 8:41. Tied 21–21. **Drive: 6 plays, 78 yards, 2:20.**
- SDG – Wes Chandler 27-yard pass from Ed Luther (Rolf Benirschke kick), 4:13. Chargers 28–21. **Drive: 4 plays, 99 yards, 1:07.**
- SDG – Rolf Benirschke 43-yard field goal, 1:52. Chargers 28–21. **Drive: 4 plays, 4 yards, 1:07.**
- WAS – Mark Moseley 37-yard field goal, 0:04. Seahawks 14–0. **Drive: 9 plays, 72 yards, 1:48.**

**Top passers**

- WAS – Joe Theismann – 25/46, 324 yards, TD, INT
- SDG – Ed Luther – 19/36, 314 yards, 2 TD, 6 INT

**Top rushers**

- WAS – John Riggins – 29 rushes, 93 yards, 2 TD
- SDG – Chuck Muncie – 16 rushes, 83 yards, TD

**Top receivers**

- WAS – Art Monk – 7 receptions, 106 yards
- SDG – Wes Chandler – 4 receptions, 103 yards, TD

Mark Moseley's field goal with 4 seconds left beat the Chargers after they had overcome a seventeen point 4th-quarter deficit. It took only four plays for Joe Theismann to open the scoring with his touchdown pass. Later in the opening quarter Luther's threw his first interception of the game in his own territory, but Moseley missed a 43-yard field goal. Luther then converted a pair of 3rd downs with passes to Winslow and Pete Holohan to set up Muncie's game-tying touchdown run. The Chargers had a 2nd and 10 at the Washington 11-yard line on their next drive, but Sherman Smith fumbled at the end of a 4-yard run, and the ball rolled out of bounds in the end zone for a touchback and a turnover. The next two Washington drives ended with a Danny Walters interception and a 52-yard Moseley field goal try that missed after striking the right upright. Luther was intercepted on the next play, and Moseley's 43-yard success made it 10–7 at the break.

Washington intercepted a deep pass from Luther early in the second half, and drove 93 yards the other way for a touchdown. The drive included a 48-yard run on a fake punt by Jeff Hayes. Luther was intercepted again on the next drive, and Washington again drove for a touchdown, pushing their lead to 24–7 early in the 4th quarter. The turnovers continued for Luther, who was intercepted and then lost a fumble in quick succession, both in his own territory. Moseley responded with missed field goal tries from 47 and 39 yards. The Charger offense then found form, beginning with a 78-yard drive which Muncie began with a 21-yard run before Holohan had catches of 35 and 23 yards, the latter for a touchdown on 3rd and 11. Washington drove inside the San Diego 20 before a holding penalty and a King sack prompted them to punt; Hayes pinned the Chargers on their own 1-yard line. Luther covered the full 99 yards with only four passes, all complete—10 and 39 yards to Chandler, 23 yards to Joiner and 27 to Chandler again for the touchdown. San Diego completed the comeback after Brooks' 30-yard punt return to the Washington 30; the offense could only gain 4 yards but Benirschke was successful on a 43-yard kick with 1:52 to play. Theismann converted a 3rd and 7 from his own 12 early in the winning drive, which Moseley eventually capped with a 37-yard field goal. Luther was intercepted once more as time ran out.

San Diego committed eight of the game's nine turnovers; Luther was intercepted six times and lost a fumble. It was the first time the Chargers had lost three in a row with Don Coryell as their head coach.

==== Week 10: at Pittsburgh Steelers ====
Week Ten: San Diego Chargers at Pittsburgh Steelers – Game summary

Quarter	1	2	3	4	Total
Chargers	0	3	0	0	**3**
**Steelers**	17	3	3	3	**26**

at Three Rivers Stadium, Pittsburgh, Pennsylvania

- Date: November 6
- Game time: 1:00 p.m. EST
- Game weather: 43 °F (6.1 °C), relative humidity 71%, wind 11 miles per hour (18 km/h; 9.6 kn)
- Game attendance: 58,191
- Referee: Jerry Seeman
- TV announcers (NBC): Bob Costas and Bob Trumpy
- Box score

Game information

**First quarter**

- PIT – Walter Abercrombie 6-yard run (Gary Anderson kick), 12:43. Steelers 7–0. **Drive: 6 plays, 71 yards, 2:17.**
- PIT – Gary Anderson 45-yard field goal, 4:21. Steelers 10–0. **Drive: 10 plays, 39 yards, 4:39.**
- PIT – Mel Blount 3-yard fumble return (Gary Anderson kick), 1:41. Steelers 17–0.

**Second quarter**

- SDG – Rolf Benirschke 29-yard field goal, 10:42. Steelers 17–3. **Drive: 11 plays, 56 yards, 3:21.**
- PIT – Gary Anderson 30-yard field goal, 4:36. Steelers 20–3. **Drive: 11 plays, 60 yards, 6:06.**

**Third quarter**

- PIT – Gary Anderson 49-yard field goal, 8:28. Steelers 23–3. **Drive: 4 plays, 7 yards, 1:04.**

**Fourth quarter**

- PIT – Gary Anderson 42-yard field goal, 14:07. Steelers 26–3. **Drive: 7 plays, 22 yards, 2:49.**

**Top passers**

- SDG – Ed Luther – 14/29, 135 yards, INT
- PIT – Cliff Stoudt – 11/23, 150 yards, INT

**Top rushers**

- SDG – Chuck Muncie – 15 rushes, 61 yards
- PIT – Franco Harris – 22 rushes, 70 yards

**Top receivers**

- SDG – Kellen Winslow – 5 receptions, 69 yards
- PIT – Walter Abercrombie – 1 reception, 51 yards

Luther struggled again as the Chargers lost their fourth game in a row. Steelers running back Walter Abercrombie had a 51-yard reception on the game's fifth play and scored on the next, putting Pittsburgh ahead to stay. Lowe recovered a fumble at the Steelers 34-yard line soon afterwards, but the Chargers gained no yards on three plays and Benirschke missed from 52 yards. Pittsburgh made their first field goal on the next drive, and extended their lead when Luther fumbled and Mel Blount recovered and scored. Walters made an interception at his own 23 in the 2nd quarter and San Diego drove 56 yards for their only points of the game, but Pittsburgh came straight back with a field goal of their own, and led 20–3 at halftime.

After the Steelers' third field goal, San Diego took over from their own 20-yard line and produced their only serious scoring threat of the second half. Muncie began the drive with carries of 12 and 17 yards, and later converted a 4th and 1. The Chargers reached 4th and 4 at the Pittsburgh 16, from where Luther was sacked and fumbled. The Steelers returned the ball to the Chargers 47, added a fourth field goal, and won without difficulty.

San Diego were outgained by 288 yards to 218. It was their smallest total since week 12, 1979.

==== Week 11: vs. Dallas Cowboys ====
Week Eleven: Dallas Cowboys at San Diego Chargers – Game summary

Quarter	1	2	3	4	Total
Cowboys	0	6	3	14	**23**
**Chargers**	7	10	7	0	**24**

at Jack Murphy Stadium, San Diego, California

- Date: November 13
- Game time: 1:00 p.m. PST
- Game weather: 70 °F (21.1 °C), relative humidity 82%, wind 11 miles per hour (18 km/h; 9.6 kn)
- Game attendance: 46,192
- Referee: Pat Haggerty
- TV announcers (CBS): Frank Glieber and Dick Vermeil
- Box score

Game information

**First quarter**

- SDG – Derrie Nelson 21-yard blocked punt return (Rolf Benirschke kick), 6:22. Chargers 7–0.

**Second quarter**

- SDG – Chuck Muncie 2-yard run (Rolf Benirschke kick), 4:01. Chargers 14–0. **Drive: 8 plays, 81 yards, 3:44.**
- DAL – Drew Pearson 16-yard pass from Danny White (kick failed), 0:49. Chargers 14–6. **Drive: 4 plays, 30 yards, 0:36.**
- SDG – Rolf Benirschke 37-yard field goal, 0:08. Chargers 17–6. **Drive: 5 plays, 57 yards, 0:41.**

**Third quarter**

- SDG – Pete Holohan 18-yard pass from Ed Luther (Rolf Benirschke kick), 11:31. Chargers 24–6. **Drive: 8 plays, 54 yards, 3:29.**
- DAL – Rafael Septien 37-yard field goal, 5:53. Chargers 24–9. **Drive: 13 plays, 55 yards, 5:38.**

**Fourth quarter**

- DAL – Tony Hill 35-yard pass from Danny White (Rafael Septien kick), 14:53. Chargers 24–16. **Drive: 9 plays, 83 yards, 2:35.**
- DAL – Billy Joe DuPree 4-yard pass from Danny White (Rafael Septien kick), 8:13. Chargers 24–23. **Drive: 10 plays, 65 yards, 4:54.**

**Top passers**

- DAL – Danny White – 31/47, 300 yards, 3 TD
- SDG – Ed Luther – 26/43, 340 yards, TD, INT

**Top rushers**

- DAL – Tony Dorsett – 17 rushes, 58 yards
- SDG – Chuck Muncie – 18 rushes, 30 yards, TD

**Top receivers**

- DAL – Tony Hill – 7 receptions, 99 yards, TD
- SDG – Charlie Joiner – 6 receptions, 186 yards

Luther's first career win was a surprise defeat of the 9–1 Cowboys. San Diego's special teams put them ahead to stay when Miles McPherson blocked a Danny White punt and Derrie Nelson returned the loose ball for a touchdown. The offense embarked on an 81-yard touchdown drive midway through the 2nd quarter; Luther completed 4 of 6 passes for 80 yards, and Muncie finished from the 2-yard line. Dallas missed a 50-yard field goal with 1:45 left in the half, but got another chance when Luther was intercepted. They drove 30 yards for a touchdown but the extra point was mishit and missed to the left. Taking over at his own 26-yard line with 43 seconds left in the half, Luther completed three straight passes for 56 yards. Two plays later, Benirschke's 37-yard kick extended the lead to 17–6.

The Chargers took the second half kickoff and narrowly converted a 3rd and 10 through Joiner. They reached 3rd and 1 at the Dallas 31-yard line. Consecutive catches of 13 and 18 yards by Holohan took them to the end zone and an eighteen point lead. Dallas had to settle for a field goal on their next drive after Lowe sacked White on 3rd and goal from the 11, but followed up with consecutive touchdown drives and drew within a point with eight minutes still to play. They had one more possession, starting from their own 4-yard line and gaining one first down before punting. San Diego's ran the final 3:37 off the clock; on 3rd and 1 Muncie ran for 2 yards, then on 3rd and 6 Joiner dove for a 12-yard catch.

San Diego won despite rushing 20 times for only 23 yards. Muncie had 18 carries for 30 yards and a touchdown, but also caught 4 passes for 65 yards.

==== Week 12: at St. Louis Cardinals ====
Week Twelve: San Diego Chargers at St. Louis Cardinals – Game summary

Quarter	1	2	3	4	Total
Chargers	0	7	0	7	**14**
**Cardinals**	7	30	7	0	**44**

at Busch Stadium, St. Louis, Missouri

- Date: November 20
- Game time: 12:00 p.m. CST
- Game weather: 54 °F (12.2 °C), relative humidity 80%, wind 21 miles per hour (34 km/h; 18 kn)
- Game attendance: 40,644
- Referee: Tom Dooley
- TV announcers (NBC): Bob Costas and Bob Trumpy
- Box score

Game information

**First quarter**

- STL – Pat Tilley 71-yard pass from Neil Lomax (Neil O'Donoghue kick), 5:49. Cardinals 7–0. **Drive: 5 plays, 94 yards, 2:23.**

**Second quarter**

- STL – Neil O'Donoghue 39-yard field goal, 11:33. Cardinals 10–0. **Drive: 8 plays, 77 yards, 3:21.**
- STL – Earl Ferrell 11-yard run (Neil O'Donoghue kick), 9:44. Cardinals 17–0. **Drive: 5 plays, 52 yards, 1:44.**
- STL – Doug Marsh 10-yard pass from Neil Lomax (Neil O'Donoghue kick), 7:52. Cardinals 24–0. **Drive: 2 plays, 12 yards, 0:58.**
- STL – Neil Lomax 1-yard run (Neil O'Donoghue kick), 4:26. Cardinals 31–0. **Drive: 7 plays, 39 yards, 3:10.**
- STL – Neil Lomax 11-yard run (kick failed), 3:25. Cardinals 37–0. **Drive: 1 play, 11 yards, 0:06.**
- SDG – Chuck Muncie 1-yard run (Rolf Benirschke kick), 0:38. Cardinals 37–7. **Drive: 12 plays, 81 yards, 2:47.**

**Third quarter**

- STL – Ottis Anderson 1-yard run (Neil O'Donoghue kick), 3:20. Cardinals 44–7. **Drive: 6 plays, 38 yards, 2:59.**

**Fourth quarter**

- SDG – Kellen Winslow 24-yard pass from Ed Luther (Rolf Benirschke kick), 2:50. Cardinals 44–14. **Drive: 13 plays, 83 yards, 6:46.**

**Top passers**

- SDG – Ed Luther – 24/50, 338 yards, TD, 3 INT
- STL – Neil Lomax – 12/20, 247 yards, 2 TD, INT

**Top rushers**

- SDG – Chuck Muncie – 13 rushes, 21 yards, TD
- STL – Ottis Anderson – 28 rushes, 113 yards, TD

**Top receivers**

- SDG – Kellen Winslow – 5 receptions, 117 yards, TD
- STL – Pat Tilley – 3 receptions, 90 yards, TD

A 30 point scoring burst for St. Louis turned a close game into a blowout. The Chargers trailed only 7–0 when they drove from their own 37 to a 2nd and goal from the Cardinals 1-yard line, from where they began the 2nd quarter. Muncie lost a fumble on the next play, and Neil Lomax immediately made a 55-yard completion to move St. Louis away from their own goal line. That drive ended with a field goal, after which the Chargers were surprised by an onside kick—the Cardinals recovered and drove for a touchdown. San Diego's next three drives lasted four plays, two plays and one play, ending with two interceptions and a lost fumble for Luther. Each time, St. Louis scored a touchdown to run their lead to 37–0 with three minutes still to play in the first half. Subsequent touchdowns for Muncie and Winslow slightly improved the final score.

The Cardinals' scoring outburst took only 8:08 of game time, during which the Chargers ran seven offensive plays and had three turnovers. The final statistics showed relatively small advantages for St. Louis in first downs (18 to 16) and offensive yardage (378 to 315), but San Diego committed six and of the game's eight turnovers.

==== Week 13: vs. Denver Broncos ====
Week Thirteen: Denver Broncos at San Diego Chargers – Game summary

Quarter	1	2	3	4	Total
Broncos	7	0	0	0	**7**
**Chargers**	14	7	0	10	**31**

at Jack Murphy Stadium, San Diego, California

- Date: November 27
- Game time: 1:00 p.m. PST
- Game weather: 57 °F (13.9 °C), relative humidity 42%, wind 6 miles per hour (9.7 km/h; 5.2 kn)
- Game attendance: 43,650
- Referee: Gordon McCarter
- TV announcers (NBC): Don Criqui and Gene Washington
- Box score

Game information

**First quarter**

- DEN – Nathan Poole 1-yard run (Rich Karlis kick), 10:59. Broncos 7–0. **Drive: 5 plays, 21 yards, 2:58.**
- SDG – Kellen Winslow 9-yard pass from Dan Fouts (Rolf Benirschke kick), 4:54. Tied 7–7. **Drive: 14 plays, 85 yards, 6:05.**
- SDG – Kellen Winslow 2-yard pass from Dan Fouts (Rolf Benirschke kick), 1:29. Chargers 14–7. **Drive: 7 plays, 27 yards, 3:05.**

**Second quarter**

- SDG – James Brooks 3-yard run (Rolf Benirschke kick), 8:51. Chargers 21–7. **Drive: 9 plays, 74 yards, 4:28.**

**Third quarter**

- No scoring plays.

**Fourth quarter**

- SDG – Chuck Muncie 1-yard run (Rolf Benirschke kick), 14:43. Chargers 28–7. **Drive: 5 plays, 63 yards, 1:20.**
- SDG – Rolf Benirschke 20-yard field goal, 6:08. Chargers 31–7. **Drive: 12 plays, 62 yards, 5:29.**

**Top passers**

- DEN – John Elway – 14/28, 147 yards, 3 INT
- SDG – Dan Fouts – 24/33, 299 yards, 2 TD, INT

**Top rushers**

- DEN – Gerald Willhite – 5 rushes, 33 yards
- SDG – Chuck Muncie – 19 rushes, 82 yards, TD

**Top receivers**

- DEN – Steve Watson – 2 receptions, 65 yards
- SDG – Kellen Winslow – 6 receptions, 103 yards, 2 TD

Fouts ended his five-game absence and led the Chargers to victory. He began badly by losing a fumble on the game's third play, leading to the Broncos' lone touchdown. San Diego responded immediately with an 85-yard drive that included a 4-yard run by Muncie on 4th and 1 from the Denver 13-yard line. Muncie fumbled on the next play but Chandler recovered, allowing Fouts and Winslow to combine for the touchdown on 3rd and goal. Walters intercepted John Elway on the first play of Denver's reply and returned the ball 18 yards to the Broncos 27-yard line, setting up a short drive and another Winslow touchdown. After a Denver punt, the Chargers produced their third consecutive touchdown; their 74-yard drive began with Winslow's 28-yard catch and ended with Brooks' short scoring run. The Broncos had a 2nd and 2 from the San Diego 21 late in the half, but Walters came up with an interception and the Chargers went into halftime up 21–7.

San Diego forced a punt to start the second half, then Fouts led them from their own 14-yard line to a 1st and goal at the 10 before being intercepted in the end zone. Denver drove to the Chargers 37 but Elway threw incomplete on 4th and 11. San Diego soon scored again—Chandler drew a 36-yard pass interference penalty in the end zone, and Muncie reached the end zone on the next play. After Denver were again stopped on downs, Fouts completed passes of 26 yards to Joiner and 28 to Winslow en route to the Benirschke field goal that ended the scoring.

The San Diego defense sacked Elway four times and intercepted him three times. They had two 100-yard receivers, with Winslow catching 6 passes for 103 yards and 2 touchdowns while Joiner caught 7 for 102 yards.

==== Week 14: vs. Los Angeles Raiders ====
Week Fourteen: Los Angeles Raiders at San Diego Chargers – Game summary

Quarter	1	2	3	4	Total
**Raiders**	0	14	28	0	**42**
Chargers	7	3	0	0	**10**

at Jack Murphy Stadium, San Diego, California

- Date: December 1
- Game time: 6:00 p.m. PST
- Game weather: 65 °F (18.3 °C), relative humidity 64%, wind 12 miles per hour (19 km/h; 10 kn)
- Game attendance: 47,760
- Referee: Dick Jorgensen
- TV announcers (ABC): Frank Gifford, Don Meredith and Howard Cosell
- Box score

Game information

**First quarter**

- SDG – Chuck Muncie 5-yard pass from Dan Fouts (Rolf Benirschke kick), 8:04. Chargers 7–0. **Drive: 7 plays, 52 yards, 3:03.**

**Second quarter**

- SDG – Rolf Benirschke 24-yard field goal, 9:14. Chargers 10–0. **Drive: 12 plays, 77 yards, 3:42.**
- RAI – Todd Christensen 43-yard pass from Marcus Allen (Chris Bahr kick), 1:50. Chargers 10–7. **Drive: 6 plays, 63 yards, 2:52.**
- RAI – Todd Christensen 25-yard pass from Jim Plunkett (Chris Bahr kick), 0:26. Raiders 14–10. **Drive: 5 plays, 65 yards, 0:32.**

**Third quarter**

- RAI – Frank Hawkins 20-yard run (Chris Bahr kick), 10:55. Raiders 21–10. **Drive: 6 plays, 46 yards, 2:15.**
- RAI – Frank Hawkins 1-yard run (Chris Bahr kick), 8:54. Raiders 28–10. **Drive: 2 plays, 2 yards, 0:27.**
- RAI – Rod Martin 29-yard interception return (Chris Bahr kick), 8:33. Raiders 35–10.
- RAI – Todd Christensen 14-yard pass from Jim Plunkett (Chris Bahr kick), 3:21. Raiders 42–10. **Drive: 6 plays, 49 yards, 2:44.**

**Fourth quarter**

- No scoring plays.

**Top passers**

- RAI – Jim Plunkett – 14/28, 156 yards, 2 TD, INT
- SDG – Dan Fouts – 16/30, 186 yards, TD, 2 INT

**Top rushers**

- RAI – Frank Hawkins – 8 rushes, 56 yards, 2 TD
- SDG – Chuck Muncie – 13 rushes, 47 yards

**Top receivers**

- RAI – Todd Christensen – 8 receptions, 140 yards, 3 TD
- SDG – Charlie Joiner – 5 receptions, 72 yards

San Diego were officially eliminate from postseason contention after a collapse against Los Angeles. Walters intercepted a deep pass early in the game and returned it 33 yards to his own 48. From there, the Chargers drove to a 3rd and 5 at the Raiders 17-yard line, from where Joiner converted with a 12-yard catch and Muncie scored on the next play. Benirschke added a short field goal in the 2nd quarter to extend the lead to ten points. The game turned on a Raiders trick play with two minutes left in the half—on 3rd and 1 from the San Diego 43, running back Marcus Allen threw a touchdown pass to Todd Christensen. Jim Plunkett combined with the same player on their next drive, and Los Angeles led 14–10 at halftime.

Los Angeles pulled away in the 3rd quarter, forcing a San Diego three-and-out and scoring with their first drive. Fouts was sacked and fumbled soon afterwards, leaving the Raiders with only 2 yards to go for their fourth touchdown in four drives. Fouts was intercepted on the next two plays from scrimmage, with the first of these run back for a touchdown; this gave him three turnovers in as many plays. After an exchange of punts, Los Angeles drove for the game's final points.

The Raiders scored their 42 points in a span of 13:29. Despite the lopsided scoreline, Los Angeles had only one more yard of offense (323 to 322) and slightly less time of possession (28:59 to 31:01).

==== Week 15: vs. Kansas City Chiefs ====
Week Fifteen: Kansas City Chiefs at San Diego Chargers – Game summary

Quarter	1	2	3	4	Total
Chiefs	7	7	10	14	**38**
**Chargers**	10	14	14	3	**41**

at Jack Murphy Stadium, San Diego, California

- Date: December 11
- Game time: 1:00 p.m. PST
- Game weather: 58 °F (14.4 °C), relative humidity 78%, wind 6 miles per hour (9.7 km/h; 5.2 kn)
- Game attendance: 35,510
- Referee: Ben Dreith
- TV announcers (NBC): Charlie Jones and Bob Griese
- Box score

Game information

**First quarter**

- SDG – Rolf Benirschke 27-yard field goal, 10:33. Chargers 3–0. **Drive: 7 plays, 21 yards, 2:37.**
- SDG – Kellen Winslow 37-yard pass from Dan Fouts (Rolf Benirschke kick), 4:40. Chargers 10–0. **Drive: 5 plays, 43 yards, 2:15.**
- KAN – Carlos Carson 50-yard pass from Bill Kenney (Nick Lowery kick), 2:06. Chargers 10–7. **Drive: 5 plays, 80 yards, 2:34.**

**Second quarter**

- SDG – Kellen Winslow 18-yard pass from Dan Fouts (Rolf Benirschke kick), 14:06. Chargers 17–7. **Drive: 7 plays, 73 yards, 3:00.**
- KAN – Stephone Paige 20-yard pass from Bill Kenney (Nick Lowery kick), 5:29. Chargers 17–14. **Drive: 7 plays, 58 yards, 1:48.**
- SDG – Kellen Winslow 5-yard pass from Dan Fouts (Rolf Benirschke kick), 0:53. Chargers 24–14. **Drive: 12 plays, 92 yards, 4:22.**

**Third quarter**

- KAN – Theotis Brown 49-yard run (Nick Lowery kick), 13:24. Chargers 24–21. **Drive: 5 plays, 71 yards, 0:56.**
- SDG – Dan Fouts 1-yard run (Rolf Benirschke kick), 6:55. Chargers 31–21. **Drive: 12 plays, 70 yards, 6:29.**
- KAN – Nick Lowery 49-yard field goal, 4:03. Chargers 31–24. **Drive: 7 plays, 38 yards, 2:52.**
- SDG – Wes Chandler 44-yard pass from Ed Luther (Rolf Benirschke kick), 0:02. Chargers 38–24. **Drive: 5 plays, 80 yards, 1:08.**

**Fourth quarter**

- KAN – Stephone Paige 16-yard pass from Bill Kenney (Nick Lowery kick), 11:45. Chargers 38–31. **Drive: 6 plays, 73 yards, 3:17.**
- KAN – Willie Scott 3-yard pass from Bill Kenney (Nick Lowery kick), 1:34. Tied 38–38. **Drive: 4 plays, 46 yards, 0:54.**
- SDG – Rolf Benirschke 28-yard field goal, 0:02. Chargers 41–38. **Drive: 7 plays, 70 yards, 1:32.**

**Top passers**

- KAN – Bill Kenney – 31/41, 411 yards, 4 TD, INT
- SDG – Dan Fouts – 25/36, 285 yards, 3 TD, INT

**Top rushers**

- KAN – Theotis Brown – 8 rushes, 94 yards, TD
- SDG – James Brooks – 14 rushes, 81 yards

**Top receivers**

- KAN – Carlos Carson – 7 receptions, 165 yards, TD
- SDG – Kellen Winslow – 14 receptions, 162 yards, 3 TD

Winslow's three first half touchdowns set the Chargers up for a high-scoring win. King recovered a fumble on the game's fourth play to set up Benirschke's early field goal. Kansas City were forced to punt and Brooks returned the ball 28 yards to the Chiefs 43-yard line; Fouts converted a 3rd and 8 with a 9-yard pass to Holohan and Winslow scored his first touchdown two plays later. Kansas City came back with a 50-yard touchdown when Carlos Carson beat the single coverage of Walters. The Chargers went straight back up by ten points by covering 73 yards without having to face a 3rd down; Sievers had a 28-yard reception and Winslow was awarded the touchdown despite one of his feet being out of bounds in the back of the end zone. Preston stopped a threatening Chiefs drive with an interception, but Kansas City scored a touchdown on their next possession. The Chargers again responded immediately, this time with a 12-play, 92-yard drive that featured three conversions on 3rd and 1 (one on a catch by Winslow and two on runs by Muncie). Winslow capped the drive with his third touchdown of the half and San Diego went into the interval up 24–14.

Kansas City scored on their first possession of the second half on a breakaway 49-yard run, but San Diego came straight back with a touchdown for the third time. Third down situations were converted with passes to Winslow, Chandler and Winslow again, before the touchdown came on a broken play; Muncie slipped before Fouts could hand him the ball, so the quarterback kept it himself and dove over from a yard out. The Chiefs scored a field goal, then Fouts was intercepted on one drive and knocked out with a shoulder injury on the next. Luther came in and threw a touchdown to Chandler on his second attempt of the game, increasing the lead to 38–24. Kansas City pulled back within seven points with a touchdown, then the Chargers ran over five minutes off the clock with a 13-play drive that featured a 4th-down conversion by Brooks but ended when a Luther pass was tipped and intercepted. The Chiefs reached a 1st and goal at the 3, but Cliff Thrift forced a fumble that Ferguson recovered. San Diego went three-and-out, and Kansas City needed only four plays to drive for the game-tying touchdown. The Chargers began the winning drive at their own 20 with 1:34 left. Duckworth drew a 25-yard pass interference penalty and had a 14-yard catch; Brooks moved the ball to the Kansas City 14 with an 18-yard run, and Benirschke hit the decisive field goal two plays later.

A total of 13,945 no-shows caused the small attendance figures. Winslow's 14 catches were a new franchise record. (Note: Winslow broke this record himself with 15 catches in week 6, 1984.) The teams combined for over 1,000 yards of offense (537 for the Chiefs, 476 for the Chargers).

==== Week 16: at Los Angeles Raiders ====
Week Sixteen: San Diego Chargers at Los Angeles Raiders – Game summary

Quarter	1	2	3	4	Total
Chargers	7	0	7	0	**14**
**Raiders**	7	6	3	14	**30**

at Memorial Coliseum, Los Angeles, California

- Date: December 18
- Game time: 1:00 p.m. PST
- Game weather: 56 °F (13.3 °C), relative humidity 75%, wind 6 miles per hour (9.7 km/h; 5.2 kn)
- Game attendance: 57,325
- Referee: Jim Tunney
- TV announcers (NBC): Marv Albert and Reggie Rucker
- Box score

Game information

**First quarter**

- SDG – Bobby Duckworth 40-yard pass from Ed Luther (Rolf Benirschke kick), 8:40. Chargers 7–0. **Drive: 8 plays, 91 yards, 4:15.**
- RAI – Marcus Allen 8-yard run (Chris Bahr kick), 6:26. Tied 7–7. **Drive: 4 plays, 21 yards, 0:22.**

**Second quarter**

- RAI – Chris Bahr 21-yard field goal, 13:51. Raiders 10–7. **Drive: 11 plays, 61 yards, 3:40.**
- RAI – Chris Bahr 32-yard field goal, 0:15. Raiders 13–7. **Drive: 15 plays, 70 yards, 7:23.**

**Third quarter**

- RAI – Chris Bahr 28-yard field goal, 11:16. Raiders 16–7. **Drive: 6 plays, 44 yards, 2:53.**
- SDG – Chuck Muncie 2-yard run (Rolf Benirschke kick), 2:03. Raiders 16–14. **Drive: 17 plays, 75 yards, 9:13.**

**Fourth quarter**

- RAI – Cliff Branch 4-yard pass from Jim Plunkett (Chris Bahr kick), 13:48. Raiders 23–14. **Drive: 8 plays, 90 yards, 3:15.**
- RAI – Marcus Allen 5-yard run (Chris Bahr kick), 7:13. Raiders 30–14. **Drive: 8 plays, 68 yards, 4:01.**

**Top passers**

- SDG – Ed Luther – 20/36, 236 yards, TD, INT
- RAI – Jim Plunkett – 21/30, 332 yards, TD, INT

**Top rushers**

- SDG – Chuck Muncie – 18 rushes, 78 yards, TD
- RAI – Marcus Allen – 16 rushes, 72 yards, 2 TD

**Top receivers**

- SDG – Bobby Duckworth – 2 receptions, 54 yards, TD
- RAI – Todd Christensen – 8 receptions, 136 yards

San Diego concluded their season with defeat to the playoffs-bound Raiders. Luther again filled in for the injured Fouts, and led his team 91 yards on their first possession, the final 40 coming on Duckworth's touchdown catch. They then forced Los Angeles to punt, but Brooks failed to gather the return and the Raiders recovered, setting up their first touchdown. Los Angeles drove into Chargers territory on their next three drives, resulting in two field goals either side of a King interception. They led 13–7 at halftime.

The Raiders added a third field goal on their first drive of the second half, before San Diego got back into the game with a 17-play, 75-yard drive that consumed over nine minutes. Winslow converted three 3rd downs, while Muncie got just enough on a 4th and inches and eventually scored from the 2-yard line. Los Angeles faced a 3rd and 4 from their own 16 soon afterwards, but converted with a 41-yard pass from Plunkett. That led to a touchdown, and the Raiders scored another on their next drive as they eased to the win.

Muncie had 5 catches for 43 yards to go with his 18 carries for 78 yards and a touchdown. The touchdown was the 74th and last of his career.

=== Standings ===
AFC West
	W	L	T	PCT	DIV	CONF	PF	PA	STK
^{(1)} Los Angeles Raiders	12	4	0	.750	6–2	10–2	442	338	W1
^{(4)} Seattle Seahawks	9	7	0	.563	5–3	8–4	403	397	W2
^{(5)} Denver Broncos	9	7	0	.563	3–5	9–5	302	327	L1
San Diego Chargers	6	10	0	.375	4–4	4–8	358	462	L1
Kansas City Chiefs	6	10	0	.375	2–6	4–8	386	367	W1

== Awards ==
Three Chargers were named to the AFC Pro Bowl squad, with Fouts a starter and Winslow and Chandler both backups. None were named first or second team All-Pro by the Associated Press. Four Chargers received votes for the Defensive Rookie of the Year: Walters had 6, Byrd 4, Smith 2 and Green 1 vote (the award was won by Vernon Maxwell with 39 votes).
