= 1984 San Diego Chargers season =

NFL team season

- Owner: Alex Spanos
- General manager: Johnny Sanders
- Head coach: Don Coryell
- Home stadium: Jack Murphy Stadium

Results
- Record: 7–9
- Division place: 5th AFC West
- Playoffs: Did not qualify
- All-Pros: None
- Pro Bowlers: 1: RB Earnest Jackson

The 1984 San Diego Chargers season was the franchise's 15th season in the National Football League (NFL) and its 25th overall. From a 6–10 record in 1983, the team improved to 7–9. Despite winning seven games, the Chargers failed to win a single game within their division.

Before the second game of the season against the Seattle Seahawks, running back Chuck Muncie missed the team's charter flight from San Diego. He told Chargers coach Don Coryell that he was late because vandals slashed the four tires on his car, but Coryell did not believe him. Muncie arrived in Seattle, but he was sent back to San Diego and did not play. Two days later, he was traded to the Miami Dolphins for a second-round draft pick; however, a urinalysis given by Miami detected cocaine, and the trade was voided. Afterwards, Muncie entered an Arizona drug rehabilitation center for a month. On November 15, he was suspended indefinitely by the NFL; Muncie never played another NFL game.

== NFL draft ==
1984 San Diego Chargers draft
Round	Pick	Player	Position	College	Notes
1	6	Mossy Cade	Safety	Texas	Played in the USFL for the Memphis Showboats
2	33	Mike Guendling	Linebacker	Northwestern	
5	118	Lionel James	Running back	Auburn	
6	145	Keith Guthrie	Defensive tackle	Texas A&M	
7	174	Jesse Bendross	Wide receiver	Alabama	
8	199	Ray Woodard	Defensive tackle	Texas	
8	219	Bob Craighead	Running back	Northeast Louisiana	Traded from San Francisco 49ers
9	230	Zack Barnes	Defensive tackle	Alabama State	
11	286	Buford McGee	Running back	Mississippi	
12	331	Keith Higgins	Wide receiver	Houston	
Made roster † Pro Football Hall of Fame * Made at least one Pro Bowl during career

== Roster ==
1984 San Diego Chargers roster
Quarterbacks (QB): 11 Ed Luther; 12 Bruce Mathison; Running backs (RB): 41 Earnest Jackson; 26 Lionel James; 21 Buford McGee; 25 Wayne Morris; 32 Jewerl Thomas; Wide receivers (WR): 86 Jesse Bendross; 89 Wes Chandler; 82 Bobby Duckworth; 18 Charlie Joiner; Tight ends (TE): 84 Ron Egloff; 88 Pete Holohan; 83 Bobby Micho; 85 Eric Sievers	Offensive linemen (OL): 77 Sam Claphan T; 75 Andrew Gissinger T; 69 Derrel Gofourth G/C; 64 Chuck Loewen T/G; 62 Don Macek C; 60 Dennis McKnight G; 67 Ed White T; 63 Doug Wilkerson G; Defensive linemen (DL): 91 Tony Chickillo NT; 78 Chuck Ehin DE; 68 Bill Elko NT; 73 Keith Guthrie NT; 76 Keith Ferguson DE; 90 Fred Robinson DE; 99 Lee Williams DE	Linebackers (LB): 50 Carlos Bradley OLB; 58 Mike Green ILB; 57 Linden King OLB; 51 Woodrow Lowe OLB; 55 Derrie Nelson ILB; 56 Vince Osby OLB; 54 Billy Ray Smith ILB; 59 Cliff Thrift ILB; 92 Eric Williams ILB; Defensive backs (DB): 48 Tim Fox FS; 28 Ken Greene SS; 20 Reuben Henderson CB; 31 Bill Kay CB; 24 Miles McPherson FS; 33 Lucious Smith CB; 27 John Turner CB; 49 Andre Young SS; Special teams (ST): 6 Rolf Benirschke K; 7 Maury Buford P	Reserve: 71 Zach Barnes DE (IR); 22 Gill Byrd CB (IR); 34 Bobby Craighead RB (IR); 14 Dan Fouts QB (IR); 43 Bob Gregor FS (IR); 53 Mike Guendling LB (IR); 46 Chuck Muncie RB (NF-Inj.); 52 Ray Preston LB (IR); 45 Johnny Ray Smith CB (IR); 47 Sherman Smith RB (PUP); 23 Danny Walters CB (IR); 80 Kellen Winslow TE (IR); 70 Ray Woodard DE (IR); Rookies in italics

== Preseason ==
Week	Date	Opponent	Result	Record	Venue	Attendance
1	August 4	Los Angeles Rams	W 17–10	1–0	Jack Murphy Stadium	
2	August 11	Dallas Cowboys	L 13–24	1–1	Jack Murphy Stadium	
3	August 18	San Francisco 49ers	W 35–15	2–1	Jack Murphy Stadium	
4	August 23	at Los Angeles Rams	L 14–47	2–2	Anaheim Stadium	

== Regular season ==
=== Schedule ===
Week	Date	Opponent	Result	Record	Venue	Attendance	Recap
1	September 2	at Minnesota Vikings	**W** 42–13	1–0	Hubert H. Humphrey Metrodome	57,276	Recap
2	September 9	at **Seattle Seahawks**	**L** 17–31	1–1	Kingdome	61,314	Recap
3	September 16	Houston Oilers	**W** 31–14	2–1	Jack Murphy Stadium	52,266	Recap
4	September 24	at **Los Angeles Raiders**	**L** 30–33	2–2	Los Angeles Memorial Coliseum	76,131	Recap
5	September 30	Detroit Lions	**W** 27–24	3–2	Jack Murphy Stadium	53,509	Recap
6	October 7	at Green Bay Packers	**W** 34–28	4–2	Lambeau Field	54,045	Recap
7	October 14	at **Kansas City Chiefs**	**L** 13–31	4–3	Arrowhead Stadium	62,233	Recap
8	October 21	**Los Angeles Raiders**	**L** 37–44	4–4	Jack Murphy Stadium	57,442	Recap
9	October 29	**Seattle Seahawks**	**L** 0–24	4–5	Jack Murphy Stadium	53,974	Recap
10	November 4	at Indianapolis Colts	**W** 38–10	5–5	Hoosier Dome	60,143	Recap
11	November 11	**Denver Broncos**	**L** 13–16	5–6	Jack Murphy Stadium	53,162	Recap
12	November 18	Miami Dolphins	**W** 34–28 (OT)	6–6	Jack Murphy Stadium	53,041	Recap
13	November 25	at Pittsburgh Steelers	**L** 24–52	6–7	Three Rivers Stadium	55,856	Recap
14	December 3	Chicago Bears	**W** 20–7	7–7	Jack Murphy Stadium	45,470	Recap
15	December 9	at **Denver Broncos**	**L** 13–16	7–8	Mile High Stadium	74,867	Recap
16	December 16	**Kansas City Chiefs**	**L** 21–42	7–9	Jack Murphy Stadium	40,221	Recap
Note: Intra-division opponents are in **bold** text.

=== Game summaries ===
==== Week 1: at Minnesota Vikings ====
Week 1: San Diego Chargers at Minnesota Vikings – Game summary

Quarter	1	2	3	4	Total
**Chargers**	14	7	21	0	**42**
Vikings	3	0	7	3	**13**

at Hubert H. Humphrey Metrodome, Minneapolis, Minnesota

- Date: September 2
- Game time: 12:00 p.m. CDT
- Game weather: N/A (game played indoors)
- Game attendance: 57,276
- Referee: Dick Jorgensen
- TV announcers (NBC): Phil Stone and Reggie Rucker
- Box score

Game information

**First quarter**

- SDG – Wes Chandler 20-yard pass from Dan Fouts (Rolf Benirschke kick), 11:39. Chargers 7–0. **Drive: 3 plays, 46 yards, 1:26.**
- MIN – Jan Stenerud 41-yard field goal, 7:46. Chargers 7–3. **Drive: 7 plays, 54 yards, 3:53.**
- SDG – Wes Chandler 17-yard pass from Dan Fouts (Rolf Benirschke kick), 2:05. Chargers 14–3. **Drive: 13 plays, 77 yards, 5:41.**

**Second quarter**

- SDG – Pete Johnson 1-yard run (Rolf Benirschke kick), 0:30. Chargers 21–3. **Drive: 8 plays, 84 yards, 1:15.**

**Third quarter**

- SDG – Pete Johnson 1-yard run (Rolf Benirschke kick), 12:27. Chargers 28–3. **Drive: 6 plays, 77 yards, 2:33.**
- SDG – Charlie Joiner 25-yard pass from Pete Holohan (Rolf Benirschke kick), 9:19. Chargers 35–3. **Drive: 6 plays, 52 yards, 2:11.**
- SDG – Gill Byrd 18-yard interception return (Rolf Benirschke kick), 7:32. Chargers 42–3.
- MIN – Joey Browner 63-yard fumble return (Jan Stenerud kick), 0:49. Chargers 42–10.

**Fourth quarter**

- MIN – Jan Stenerud 52-yard field goal, 4:16. Chargers 42–13. **Drive: 11 plays, 56 yards, 6:09.**

**Top passers**

- SDG – Dan Fouts – 21/28, 292 yards, 2 TD
- MIN – Tommy Kramer – 11/30, 104 yards, 3 INT

**Top rushers**

- SDG – Chuck Muncie – 14 rushes, 51 yards
- MIN – Ted Brown – 12 rushes, 53 yards

**Top receivers**

- SDG – Bobby Duckworth – 4 receptions, 115 yards
- MIN – Steve Jordan – 3 receptions, 33 yards
  MIN – Allen Rice – 2 receptions, 33 yards

==== Week 2: at Seattle Seahawks ====
Week 2: San Diego Chargers at Seattle Seahawks – Game summary

Quarter	1	2	3	4	Total
Chargers	10	0	0	7	**17**
**Seahawks**	0	10	7	14	**31**

at Kingdome, Seattle, Washington

- Date: September 9
- Game time: 1:00 p.m. PDT
- Game weather: N/A (game played indoors)
- Game attendance: 61,314
- Referee: Pat Haggerty
- TV announcers (NBC): Charlie Jones and Merlin Olsen
- Box score

Game information

**First quarter**

- SDG – Rolf Benirschke 43-yard field goal, 10:56. Chargers 3–0. **Drive: 11 plays, 55 yards, 4:04.**
- SDG – Bobby Duckworth 61-yard pass from Dan Fouts (Rolf Benirschke kick), 4:30. Chargers 10–0. **Drive: 4 plays, 80 yards, 1:35.**

**Second quarter**

- SEA – Eric Lane 1-yard run (Norm Johnson kick), 11:34. Chargers 10–7. **Drive: 15 plays, 63 yards, 5:46.**
- SEA – Norm Johnson 41-yard field goal, 0:01. Tied 10–10. **Drive: 3 plays, 56 yards, 0:23.**

**Third quarter**

- SEA – Dave Krieg 37-yard run (Norm Johnson kick), 8:17. Seahawks 17–10. **Drive: 7 plays, 50 yards, 2:50.**

**Fourth quarter**

- SEA – Dave Krieg 3-yard run (Norm Johnson kick), 14:10. Seahawks 24–10. **Drive: 9 plays, 71 yards, 4:37.**
- SEA – Daryl Turner 22-yard pass from Dave Krieg (Norm Johnson kick), 4:34. Seahawks 31–10. **Drive: 3 plays, 22 yards, 0:21.**
- SDG – Eric Sievers 4-yard pass from Dan Fouts (Rolf Benirschke kick), 0:24. Seahawks 31–17. **Drive: 4 plays, 80 yards, 0:33.**

**Top passers**

- SDG – Dan Fouts – 23/40, 332 yards, 2 TD, 4 INT
- SEA – Dave Krieg – 18/38, 263 yards, TD, INT

**Top rushers**

- SDG – Earnest Jackson – 16 rushes, 89 yards
- SEA – Dave Krieg – 6 rushes, 61 yards

**Top receivers**

- SDG – Pete Holohan – 6 receptions, 133 yards
- SEA – Daryl Turner – 3 receptions, 97 yards, TD

==== Week 3: vs. Houston Oilers ====
Week 3: Houston Oilers at San Diego Chargers – Game summary

Quarter	1	2	3	4	Total
Oilers	0	7	0	7	**14**
**Chargers**	14	14	0	3	**31**

at Jack Murphy Stadium, San Diego, California

- Date: September 16
- Game time: 1:00 p.m. PDT
- Game weather: 80 °F (26.7 °C), relative humidity 77%, wind 8 miles per hour (13 km/h; 7.0 kn)
- Game attendance: 52,266
- Referee: Gordon McCarter
- TV announcers (NBC): Charlie Jones and Bob Griese
- Box score

Game information

**First quarter**

- SDG – Earnest Jackson 3-yard run (Rolf Benirschke kick), 9:54. Chargers 7–0. **Drive: 10 plays, 60 yards, 4:01.**
- SDG – Earnest Jackson 1-yard run (Rolf Benirschke kick), 0:19. Chargers 14–0. **Drive: 11 plays, 90 yards, 6:20.**

**Second quarter**

- SDG – Pete Johnson 1-yard run (Rolf Benirschke kick), 5:29. Chargers 21–0. **Drive: 12 plays, 77 yards, 6:26.**
- HOU – Tim Smith 75-yard pass from Warren Moon (Florian Kempf kick), 5:09. Chargers 21–7. **Drive: 1 play, 75 yards, 0:20.**
- SDG – Earnest Jackson 6-yard run (Rolf Benirschke kick), 3:17. Chargers 28–7. **Drive: 3 plays, 80 yards, 1:52.**

**Third quarter**

- No scoring plays.

**Fourth quarter**

- SDG – Rolf Benirschke 23-yard field goal, 10:00. Chargers 31–7. **Drive: 9 plays, 35 yards, 4:35.**
- HOU – Eric Mullins 7-yard pass from Oliver Luck (Florian Kempf kick), 1:05. Chargers 31–14. **Drive: 5 plays, 79 yards, 1:54.**

**Top passers**

- HOU – Warren Moon – 11/31, 212 yards, TD
- SDG – Dan Fouts – 26/37, 336 yards, INT

**Top rushers**

- HOU – Larry Moriarty – 3 rushes, 11 yards
- SDG – Earnest Jackson – 21 rushes, 97 yards, 3 TD

**Top receivers**

- HOU – Tim Smith – 5 receptions, 159 yards, TD
- SDG – Kellen Winslow – 10 receptions, 146 yards

==== Week 4: at Los Angeles Raiders ====
Week 4: San Diego Chargers at Los Angeles Raiders – Game summary

Quarter	1	2	3	4	Total
Chargers	7	3	3	17	**30**
**Raiders**	6	7	7	13	**33**

at Los Angeles Memorial Coliseum, Los Angeles, California

- Date: September 24
- Game time: 6:00 p.m. PDT
- Game weather: 70 °F (21.1 °C), relative humidity 59%, wind 10 miles per hour (16 km/h; 8.7 kn)
- Game attendance: 76,131
- Referee: Gene Barth
- TV announcers (ABC): Frank Gifford, Don Meredith and O. J. Simpson
- Box score

Game information

**First quarter**

- RAI – Chris Bahr 42-yard field goal, 11:17. Raiders 3–0. **Drive: 7 plays, 46 yards, 3:43.**
- SDG – Kellen Winslow 11-yard pass from Dan Fouts (Rolf Benirschke kick), 6:44. Chargers 7–3. **Drive: 10 plays, 75 yards, 4:33.**
- RAI – Chris Bahr 36-yard field goal, 2:51. Chargers 7–6. **Drive: 7 plays, 56 yards, 3:53.**

**Second quarter**

- SDG – Rolf Benirschke 51-yard field goal, 7:06. Chargers 10–6. **Drive: 14 plays, 53 yards, 6:33.**
- RAI – Marcus Allen 1-yard run (Chris Bahr kick), 0:06. Raiders 13–10. **Drive: 15 plays, 78 yards, 7:00.**

**Third quarter**

- RAI – Marcus Allen 30-yard pass from Jim Plunkett (Chris Bahr kick), 11:10. Raiders 20–10. **Drive: 4 plays, 72 yards, 1:50.**
- SDG – Rolf Benirschke 33-yard field goal, 7:14. Raiders 20–13. **Drive: 4 plays, -3 yards, 0:56.**

**Fourth quarter**

- SDG – Earnest Jackson 1-yard run (Rolf Benirschke kick), 13:42. Tied 20–20. **Drive: 13 plays, 86 yards, 5:20.**
- SDG – Rolf Benirschke 48-yard field goal, 11:02. Chargers 23–20. **Drive: 5 plays, 26 yards, 1:11.**
- SDG – Woodrow Lowe 32-yard interception return (Rolf Benirschke kick), 10:21. Chargers 30–20.
- RAI – Marcus Allen 2-yard run (run failed), 8:20. Chargers 30–27. **Drive: 8 plays, 53 yards, 2:01.**
- RAI – Marcus Allen 1-yard run (Chris Bahr kick), 0:45. Raiders 33–30. **Drive: 10 plays, 76 yards, 2:53.**

**Top passers**

- SDG – Dan Fouts – 19/37, 227 yards, TD, INT
- RAI – Jim Plunkett – 24/33, 363 yards, TD, INT

**Top rushers**

- SDG – Earnest Jackson – 29 rushes, 155 yards, TD
- RAI – Marcus Allen – 18 rushes, 47 yards, 3 TD

**Top receivers**

- SDG – Kellen Winslow – 9 receptions, 119 yards, TD
- RAI – Todd Christensen – 8 receptions, 120 yards

==== Week 5: vs. Detroit Lions ====
Week 5: Detroit Lions at San Diego Chargers – Game summary

Quarter	1	2	3	4	Total
Lions	0	7	14	3	**24**
**Chargers**	7	17	0	3	**27**

at Jack Murphy Stadium, San Diego, California

- Date: September 30
- Game time: 1:00 p.m. PDT
- Game weather: 74 °F (23.3 °C), relative humidity 83%, wind 8 miles per hour (13 km/h; 7.0 kn)
- Game attendance: 53,509
- Referee: Jim Tunney
- TV announcers (CBS): Jim Hill and John Dockery
- Box score

Game information

**First quarter**

- SDG – Jewerl Thomas 1-yard run (Rolf Benirschke kick), 5:17. Chargers 7–0. **Drive: 11 plays, 80 yards, 5:33.**

**Second quarter**

- SDG – Jewerl Thomas 1-yard run (Rolf Benirschke kick), 12:03. Chargers 14–0. **Drive: 9 plays, 49 yards, 4:44.**
- SDG – Buford McGee 3-yard run (Rolf Benirschke kick), 4:43. Chargers 21–0. **Drive: 8 plays, 87 yards, 3:42.**
- DET – Billy Sims 1-yard run (Eddie Murray kick), 1:11. Chargers 21–7. **Drive: 9 plays, 80 yards, 3:32.**
- SDG – Rolf Benirschke 18-yard field goal, 0:04. Chargers 24–7. **Drive: 10 plays, 79 yards, 1:07.**

**Third quarter**

- DET – Billy Sims 1-yard run (Eddie Murray kick), 13:19. Chargers 24–14. **Drive: 3 plays, 90 yards, 1:41.**
- DET – Jeff Chadwick 12-yard run (Eddie Murray kick), 6:07. Chargers 24–21. **Drive: 10 plays, 80 yards, 5:14.**

**Fourth quarter**

- SDG – Rolf Benirschke 41-yard field goal, 8:17. Chargers 27–21. **Drive: 15 plays, 56 yards, 5:42.**
- DET – Eddie Murray 44-yard field goal, 3:56. Chargers 27–24. **Drive: 9 plays, 67 yards, 4:21.**

**Top passers**

- DET – Gary Danielson – 20/25, 269 yards
- SDG – Dan Fouts – 22/34, 268 yards

**Top rushers**

- DET – Billy Sims – 14 rushes, 119 yards, 2 TD
- SDG – Lionel James – 10 rushes, 58 yards

**Top receivers**

- DET – Leonard Thompson – 4 receptions, 80 yards
- SDG – Charlie Joiner – 7 receptions, 87 yards

==== Week 6: at Green Bay Packers ====
Week 6: San Diego Chargers at Green Bay Packers – Game summary

Quarter	1	2	3	4	Total
**Chargers**	7	7	10	10	**34**
Packers	7	7	7	7	**28**

at Lambeau Field, Green Bay, Wisconsin

- Date: October 7
- Game time: 3:00 p.m. CDT
- Game weather: 59 °F (15.0 °C), relative humidity 87%, wind 9 miles per hour (14 km/h; 7.8 kn)
- Game attendance: 54,045
- Referee: Jerry Seeman
- TV announcers (NBC): Jay Randolph and Gene Washington
- Box score

Game information

**First quarter**

- SDG – Bobby Duckworth 27-yard pass from Dan Fouts (Rolf Benirschke kick), 13:01. Chargers 7–0. **Drive: 5 plays, 44 yards, 1:59.**
- GB – Paul Coffman 3-yard pass from Lynn Dickey (Eddie Garcia kick), 10:24. Tied 7–7. **Drive: 8 plays, 74 yards, 2:35.**

**Second quarter**

- SDG – Pete Holohan 3-yard pass from Dan Fouts (Rolf Benirschke kick), 14:58. Chargers 14–7. **Drive: 13 plays, 80 yards, 5:27.**
- GB – Ed West 29-yard pass from Lynn Dickey (Eddie Garcia kick), 0:46. Tied 14–14. **Drive: 6 plays, 70 yards, 1:13.**

**Third quarter**

- SDG – Earnest Jackson 9-yard pass from Dan Fouts (Rolf Benirschke kick), 13:56. Chargers 21–14. **Drive: 1 play, 9 yards, 0:06.**
- GB – Gerry Ellis 4-yard run (Eddie Garcia kick), 6:44. Tied 21–21. **Drive: 4 plays, 80 yards, 1:04.**
- SDG – Rolf Benirschke 31-yard field goal, 2:14. Chargers 24–21. **Drive: 10 plays, 52 yards, 4:30.**

**Fourth quarter**

- SDG – Earnest Jackson 1-yard run, 11:21. Chargers 31–21. **Drive: 11 plays, 62 yards, 5:21.**
- GB – James Lofton 25-yard pass from Lynn Dickey (Eddie Garcia kick), 6:51. Chargers 31–28. **Drive: 5 plays, 66 yards, 1:14.**
- SDG – Rolf Benirschke 39-yard field goal, 1:32. Chargers 34–28. **Drive: 12 plays, 52 yards, 5:19.**

**Top passers**

- SDG – Dan Fouts – 31/50, 376 yards, 3 TD
- GB – Lynn Dickey – 25/40, 384 yards, 3 TD, 2 INT

**Top rushers**

- SDG – Earnest Jackson – 33 rushes, 99 yards, TD
- GB – Harlan Huckleby – 3 rushes, 25 yards

**Top receivers**

- SDG – Kellen Winslow – 15 receptions, 157 yards
- GB – James Lofton – 5 receptions, 158 yards, TD

This was the last time the Chargers defeated the Packers until Week 9, 2019.

==== Week 7: at Kansas City Chiefs ====
Week 7: San Diego Chargers at Kansas City Chiefs – Game summary

Quarter	1	2	3	4	Total
Chargers	3	3	7	0	**13**
**Chiefs**	10	0	7	14	**31**

at Arrowhead Stadium, Kansas City, Missouri

- Date: October 14
- Game time: 12:00 p.m. CDT
- Game weather: 67 °F (19.4 °C), relative humidity 88%, wind 11 miles per hour (18 km/h; 9.6 kn)
- Game attendance: 62,233
- Referee: Fred Silva
- TV announcers (NBC): Don Criqui and Merlin Olsen
- Box score

Game information

**First quarter**

- KAN – Ken Lacy 24-yard run (Nick Lowery kick), 13:14. Chiefs 7–0. **Drive: 5 plays, 75 yards, 1:46.**
- SDG – Benny Ricardo 38-yard field goal, 9:57. Chiefs 7–3. **Drive: 9 plays, 44 yards, 3:17.**
- KAN – Nick Lowery 22-yard field goal, 2:17. Chiefs 10–3. **Drive: 8 plays, 54 yards, 2:44.**

**Second quarter**

- SDG – Benny Ricardo 42-yard field goal, 10:58. Chiefs 10–6. **Drive: 13 plays, 56 yards, 6:19.**

**Third quarter**

- SDG – Gill Byrd 99-yard interception return (Benny Ricardo kick), 5:56. Chargers 13–10.
- KAN – Stephone Paige 18-yard pass from Bill Kenney (Nick Lowery kick), 4:20. Chiefs 17–13. **Drive: 4 plays, 71 yards, 1:36.**

**Fourth quarter**

- KAN – Ed Beckman 5-yard pass from Bill Kenney (Nick Lowery kick), 7:01. Chiefs 24–13. **Drive: 9 plays, 58 yards, 4:39.**
- KAN – Herman Heard 69-yard run (Nick Lowery kick), 4:37. Chiefs 31–13. **Drive: 1 play, 69 yards, 0:12.**

**Top passers**

- SDG – Dan Fouts – 30/46, 270 yards, 2 INT
- KAN – Bill Kenney – 13/22, 238 yards, 2 TD, 2 INT

**Top rushers**

- SDG – Earnest Jackson – 16 rushes, 68 yards
- KAN – Herman Heard – 7 rushes, 84 yards, TD

**Top receivers**

- SDG – Wes Chandler – 8 receptions, 93 yards
- KAN – Carlos Carson – 7 receptions, 165 yards

==== Week 8: vs. Los Angeles Raiders ====
Week 8: Detroit Lions at San Diego Chargers – Game summary

Quarter	1	2	3	4	Total
**Raiders**	7	7	20	10	**44**
Chargers	7	13	0	17	**37**

at Jack Murphy Stadium, San Diego, California

- Date: October 21
- Game time: 1:00 p.m. PDT
- Game weather: 65 °F (18.3 °C), relative humidity 71%, wind 8 miles per hour (13 km/h; 7.0 kn)
- Game attendance: 57,442
- Referee: Tom Dooley
- TV announcers (NBC): Dick Enberg and Merlin Olsen
- Box score

Game information

**First quarter**

- SDG – Earnest Jackson 5-yard run (Benny Ricardo kick), 9:56. Chargers 7–0. **Drive: 8 plays, 71 yards, 5:04.**
- RAI – Marcus Allen 10-yard pass from Marc Wilson (Chris Bahr kick), 6:19. Chargers 21–7. **Drive: 2 plays, 14 yards, 0:42.**

**Second quarter**

- SDG – Wes Chandler 22-yard pass from Dan Fouts (kick failed), 5:11. Chargers 14–0. **Drive: 9 plays, 80 yards, 3:40.**
- SDG – Earnest Jackson 32-yard run (Benny Ricardo kick), 1:53. Chargers 7–0. **Drive: 5 plays, 59 yards, 2:11.**
- RAI – Malcolm Barnwell 45-yard pass from Marc Wilson (Chris Bahr kick), 0:28. Chargers 21–7. **Drive: 5 plays, 78 yards, 1:25.**

**Third quarter**

- RAI – Chris Bahr 42-yard field goal, 11:34. Chargers 24–14. **Drive: 9 plays, 66 yards, 3:26.**
- RAI – Derrick Jensen 1-yard pass from Marc Wilson (Chris Bahr kick), 6:25. Chargers 24–21. **Drive: 4 plays, 17 yards, 1:37.**
- RAI – Chris Bahr 33-yard field goal, 4:42. Chargers 24–14. **Drive: 4 plays, 1 yard, 1:32.**
- RAI – Dokie Williams 20-yard pass from Marc Wilson (Chris Bahr kick), 4:15. Chargers 24–21. **Drive: 2 plays, 20 yards, 0:09.**

**Fourth quarter**

- SDG – Benny Ricardo 29-yard field goal, 13:20. Chargers 27–21. **Drive: 15 plays, 69 yards, 5:48.**
- RAI – Malcolm Barnwell 51-yard pass from Marc Wilson (Chris Bahr kick), 12:13. Chargers 21–7. **Drive: 3 plays, 59 yards, 1:07.**
- SDG – Kellen Winslow 5-yard pass from Dan Fouts (Benny Ricardo kick), 10:11. Chargers 27–21. **Drive: 5 plays, 67 yards, 2:02.**
- RAI – Chris Bahr 32-yard field goal, 3:54. Chargers 24–14. **Drive: 11 plays, 55 yards, 6:17.**
- SDG – Bobby Duckworth 50-yard pass from Dan Fouts (Benny Ricardo kick), 2:36. Chargers 27–21. **Drive: 4 plays, 68 yards, 1:18.**

**Top passers**

- RAI – Marc Wilson – 24/37, 332 yards, 5 TD, INT
- SDG – Dan Fouts – 24/45, 410 yards, 3 TD, 3 INT

**Top rushers**

- RAI – Marcus Allen – 19 rushes, 107 yards
- SDG – Earnest Jackson – 20 rushes, 98 yards, 2 TD

**Top receivers**

- RAI – Malcolm Barnwell – 2 receptions, 96 yards, 2 TD
- SDG – Kellen Winslow – 8 receptions, 107 yards, TD

==== Week 9: vs. Seattle Seahawks ====
Week 9: Seattle Seahawks at San Diego Chargers – Game summary

Quarter	1	2	3	4	Total
**Seahawks**	7	10	7	0	**24**
Chargers	0	0	0	0	**0**

at Jack Murphy Stadium, San Diego, California

- Date: October 29
- Game time: 6:00 p.m. PST
- Game weather: 64 °F (17.8 °C), relative humidity 76%, wind 9 miles per hour (14 km/h; 7.8 kn)
- Game attendance: 53,974
- Referee: Dick Jorgensen
- TV announcers (ABC): Frank Gifford, Don Meredith and O. J. Simpson
- Box score

Game information

**First quarter**

- SEA – Steve Largent 11-yard pass from Dave Krieg (Norm Johnson kick), 3:13. Seahawks 7–0. **Drive: 8 plays, 96 yards, 4:09.**

**Second quarter**

- SEA – Norm Johnson 42-yard field goal, 9:08. Seahawks 10–0. **Drive: 4 plays, 3 yards, 1:32.**
- SEA – Steve Largent 13-yard pass from Dave Krieg (Norm Johnson kick), 0:37. Seahawks 17–0. **Drive: 9 plays, 81 yards, 2:53.**

**Third quarter**

- SEA – Steve Largent 16-yard pass from Dave Krieg (Norm Johnson kick), 11:12. Seahawks 24–0. **Drive: 5 plays, 63 yards, 1:10.**

**Fourth quarter**

- No scoring plays.

**Top passers**

- SEA – Dave Krieg – 23/29, 282 yards, 3 TD, INT
- SDG – Dan Fouts – 24/39, 200 yards, 2 INT

**Top rushers**

- SEA – David Hughes – 10 rushes, 36 yards
- SDG – Earnest Jackson – 18 rushes, 38 yards

**Top receivers**

- SEA – Daryl Turner – 6 receptions, 92 yards
- SDG – Jesse Bendross – 4 receptions, 48 yards

==== Week 10: at Indianapolis Colts ====
Week 10: San Diego Chargers at Indianapolis Colts – Game summary

Quarter	1	2	3	4	Total
**Chargers**	7	10	7	14	**38**
Colts	0	7	3	0	**10**

at Hoosier Dome, Indianapolis, Indiana

- Date: November 4
- Game time: 1:00 p.m. EST
- Game weather: N/A (game played indoors)
- Game attendance: 60,143
- Referee: Ben Dreith
- TV announcers (NBC): Phil Stone and Dave Rowe
- Box score

Game information

**First quarter**

- SDG – Earnest Jackson 2-yard run (Rolf Benirschke kick), 1:43. Chargers 7–0. **Drive: 7 plays, 67 yards, 3:33.**

**Second quarter**

- SDG – Rolf Benirschke 23-yard field goal, 14:57. Chargers 10–0. **Drive: 4 plays, -3 yards, 1:27.**
- IND – Ray Butler 74-yard pass from Mark Herrmann (Raul Allegre kick), 13:17. Chargers 10–7. **Drive: 5 plays, 85 yards, 1:40.**
- SDG – Charlie Joiner 7-yard pass from Dan Fouts (Rolf Benirschke kick), 7:36. Chargers 17–7. **Drive: 11 plays, 78 yards, 5:41.**

**Third quarter**

- SDG – Wayne Morris 1-yard run (Rolf Benirschke kick), 9:53. Chargers 24–7. **Drive: 1 play, 1 yard, 0:03.**
- IND – Raul Allegre 54-yard field goal, 3:43. Chargers 24–14. **Drive: 10 plays, 54 yards, 6:10.**

**Fourth quarter**

- SDG – Wes Chandler 20-yard pass from Dan Fouts (Rolf Benirschke kick), 12:12. Chargers 31–14. **Drive: 11 plays, 93 yards, 6:31.**
- SDG – Buford McGee 2-yard pass from Dan Fouts (Rolf Benirschke kick), 1:56. Chargers 38–14. **Drive: 9 plays, 57 yards, 5:28.**

**Top passers**

- SDG – Dan Fouts – 27/38, 283 yards, 3 TD, 2 INT
- IND – Mark Herrmann – 18/32, 222 yards, TD, 4 INT

**Top rushers**

- SDG – Earnest Jackson – 23 rushes, 71 yards, TD
- IND – Randy McMillan – 11 rushes, 52 yards

**Top receivers**

- SDG – Charlie Joiner – 9 receptions, 119 yards, TD
- IND – Ray Butler – 3 receptions, 94 yards, TD

==== Week 11: vs. Denver Broncos ====
Week 11: Denver Broncos at San Diego Chargers – Game summary

Quarter	1	2	3	4	Total
**Broncos**	3	3	0	10	**16**
Chargers	7	3	0	3	**13**

at Jack Murphy Stadium, San Diego, California

- Date: November 11
- Game time: 1:00 p.m. PST
- Game weather: 64 °F (17.8 °C), relative humidity 69%, wind 9 miles per hour (14 km/h; 7.8 kn)
- Game attendance: 53,162
- Referee: Bob McElwee
- TV announcers (NBC): Don Criqui and Merlin Olsen
- Box score

Game information

**First quarter**

- DEN – Rich Karlis 44-yard field goal, 10:53. Broncos 3–0. **Drive: 9 plays, 30 yards, 3:01.**
- SDG – Charlie Joiner 25-yard pass from Dan Fouts (Rolf Benirschke kick), 5:37. Chargers 7–3. **Drive: 6 plays, 73 yards, 2:29.**

**Second quarter**

- DEN – Rich Karlis 45-yard field goal, 9:15. Chargers 7–6. **Drive: 4 plays, -1 yards, 1:07.**
- SDG – Rolf Benirschke 49-yard field goal, 2:44. Chargers 10–6. **Drive: 15 plays, 61 yards, 6:31.**

**Third quarter**

- No scoring plays.

**Fourth quarter**

- SDG – Rolf Benirschke 43-yard field goal, 14:04. Chargers 13–6. **Drive: 12 plays, 52 yards, 5:35.**
- DEN – Rich Karlis 37-yard field goal, 8:41. Tied 13–13. **Drive: 12 plays, 54 yards, 5:23.**
- DEN – Sammy Winder 1-yard run (Rich Karlis kick), 0:38. Broncos 16–13. **Drive: 10 plays, 77 yards, 2:25.**

**Top passers**

- DEN – John Elway – 19/35, 188 yards
- SDG – Dan Fouts – 22/38, 261 yards, TD

**Top rushers**

- DEN – Sammy Winder – 22 rushes, 37 yards, TD
- SDG – Earnest Jackson – 14 rushes, 69 yards

**Top receivers**

- DEN – Steve Watson – 5 receptions, 49 yards
- SDG – Charlie Joiner – 6 receptions, 85 yards, TD

==== Week 12: vs. Miami Dolphins ====
Week 12: Miami Dolphins at San Diego Chargers – Game summary

Quarter	1	2	3	4	OT	Total
Dolphins	0	21	0	7	0	**28**
**Chargers**	7	7	0	14	6	**34**

at Jack Murphy Stadium, San Diego, California

- Date: November 18
- Game time: 1:00 p.m. PST
- Game weather: 61 °F (16.1 °C), relative humidity 83%, wind 8 miles per hour (13 km/h; 7.0 kn)
- Game attendance: 53,041
- Referee: Red Cashion
- TV announcers (NBC): Don Criqui and Merlin Olsen
- Box score

Game information

**First quarter**

- SDG – Eric Sievers 3-yard pass from Dan Fouts (Rolf Benirschke kick), 0:33. Chargers 7–0. **Drive: 10 plays, 93 yards, 4:30.**

**Second quarter**

- MIA – Mark Clayton 12-yard pass from Dan Marino (Uwe von Schamann kick), 11:59. Tied 7–7. **Drive: 9 plays, 78 yards, 3:34.**
- MIA – Pete Johnson 1-yard run (Uwe von Schamann kick), 7:30. Dolphins 14–7. **Drive: 8 plays, 60 yards, 3:07.**
- SDG – Charlie Joiner 4-yard pass from Dan Fouts (Rolf Benirschke kick), 2:27. Tied 14–14. **Drive: 14 plays, 80 yards, 5:03.**
- MIA – Woody Bennett 4-yard pass from Dan Marino (Uwe von Schamann kick), 0:47. Dolphins 21–14. **Drive: 9 plays, 72 yards, 1:40.**

**Third quarter**

- MIA – Pete Johnson 3-yard run (Uwe von Schamann kick), 2:50. Dolphins 28–14. **Drive: 6 plays, 48 yards, 3:13.**

**Fourth quarter**

- SDG – Charlie Joiner 19-yard pass from Dan Fouts (Rolf Benirschke kick), 13:29. Dolphins 28–21. **Drive: 12 plays, 80 yards, 4:21.**
- SDG – Eric Sievers 3-yard pass from Dan Fouts (Rolf Benirschke kick), 0:51. Tied 28–28. **Drive: 19 plays, 91 yards, 10:06.**

**Overtime**

- SDG – Buford McGee 25-yard run, 11:43. Chargers 34–28. **Drive: 8 plays, 69 yards, 3:17.**

**Top passers**

- MIA – Dan Marino – 28/41, 338 yards, 2 TD, INT
- SDG – Dan Fouts – 37/56, 380 yards, 4 TD, INT

**Top rushers**

- MIA – Tony Nathan – 11 rushes, 66 yards
- SDG – Earnest Jackson – 28 rushes, 124 yards

**Top receivers**

- MIA – Mark Duper – 5 receptions, 99 yards
- SDG – Eric Sievers – 12 receptions, 119 yards, 2 TD

==== Week 13: at Pittsburgh Steelers ====
Week 13: San Diego Chargers at Pittsburgh Steelers – Game summary

Quarter	1	2	3	4	Total
Chargers	0	10	7	7	**24**
**Steelers**	3	21	21	7	**52**

at Three Rivers Stadium, Pittsburgh, Pennsylvania

- Date: November 25
- Game time: 1:00 p.m. EST
- Game weather: 39 °F (3.9 °C), relative humidity 65%, wind 3 miles per hour (4.8 km/h; 2.6 kn)
- Game attendance: 55,856
- Referee: Jim Tunney
- TV announcers (NBC): Len Berman and Gene Washington
- Box score

Game information

**First quarter**

- PIT – Gary Anderson 55-yard field goal, 8:35. Steelers 3–0. **Drive: 12 plays, 38 yards, 6:25.**

**Second quarter**

- PIT – Louis Lipps 15-yard pass from Mark Malone (Gary Anderson kick), 13:35. Steelers 10–0. **Drive: 4 plays, 58 yards, 1:59.**
- PIT – Frank Pollard 2-yard run (Gary Anderson kick), 11:12. Steelers 17–0. **Drive: 4 plays, 32 yards, 2:05.**
- SDG – Rolf Benirschke 29-yard field goal, 6:31. Steelers 17–3. **Drive: 14 plays, 59 yards, 4:41.**
- PIT – John Stallworth 30-yard pass from Mark Malone (Gary Anderson kick), 2:21. Steelers 24–3. **Drive: 8 plays, 80 yards, 4:09.**
- SDG – Lionel James 59-yard punt return (Rolf Benirschke kick), 0:15. Steelers 24–10.

**Third quarter**

- SDG – Wes Chandler 63-yard pass from Ed Luther (Rolf Benirschke kick), 13:48. Steelers 24–17. **Drive: 3 plays, 74 yards, 1:12.**
- PIT – Frank Pollard 2-yard run (Gary Anderson kick), 10:06. Steelers 31–17. **Drive: 8 plays, 73 yards, 3:42.**
- PIT – John Stallworth 5-yard pass from Mark Malone (Gary Anderson kick), 3:45. Steelers 38–17. **Drive: 3 plays, 68 yards, 1:23.**
- PIT – John Stallworth 45-yard pass from Mark Malone (Gary Anderson kick), 0:42. Steelers 45–17. **Drive: 3 plays, 41 yards, 0:55.**

**Fourth quarter**

- PIT – Mark Malone 1-yard run (Gary Anderson kick), 6:17. Steelers 52–17. **Drive: 5 plays, 21 yards, 2:28.**
- SDG – Charlie Joiner 25-yard pass from Ed Luther (Rolf Benirschke kick), 5:31. Steelers 52–24. **Drive: 5 plays, 74 yards, 1:06.**

**Top passers**

- SDG – Ed Luther – 21/32, 296 yards, 2 TD, 3 INT
- PIT – Mark Malone – 18/22, 253 yards, 4 TD

**Top rushers**

- SDG – Earnest Jackson – 10 rushes, 23 yards
- PIT – Walter Abercrombie – 19 rushes, 109 yards

**Top receivers**

- SDG – Wes Chandler – 4 receptions, 105 yards, TD
- PIT – Louis Lipps – 7 receptions, 118 yards, TD

==== Week 14: vs. Chicago Bears ====
Week 14: Chicago Bears at San Diego Chargers – Game summary

Quarter	1	2	3	4	Total
Bears	0	0	7	0	**7**
**Chargers**	0	6	0	14	**20**

at Jack Murphy Stadium, San Diego, California

- Date: December 3
- Game time: 6:00 p.m. PST
- Game weather: 59 °F (15.0 °C), relative humidity 89%, wind 10 miles per hour (16 km/h; 8.7 kn)
- Game attendance: 45,470
- Referee: Chuck Heberling
- TV announcers (ABC): Frank Gifford, Don Meredith and O. J. Simpson
- Box score

Game information

**First quarter**

- No scoring plays.

**Second quarter**

- SDG – Rolf Benirschke 48-yard field goal, 14:46. Chargers 3–0. **Drive: 6 plays, 32 yards, 1:28.**
- SDG – Rolf Benirschke 27-yard field goal, 0:26. Chargers 6–0. **Drive: 8 plays, 32 yards, 2:04.**

**Third quarter**

- CHI – Walter Payton 10-yard run (Bob Thomas kick), 6:38. Bears 7–6. **Drive: 6 plays, 34 yards, 1:12.**

**Fourth quarter**

- SDG – Bobby Duckworth 88-yard pass from Ed Luther (Rolf Benirschke kick), 9:37. Chargers 13–7. **Drive: 2 plays, 88 yards, 0:17.**
- SDG – Lee Williams 66-yard interception return (Rolf Benirschke kick), 1:15. Chargers 20–7.

**Top passers**

- CHI – Rusty Lisch – 18/33, 159 yards, INT
- SDG – Ed Luther – 12/29, 269 yards, TD

**Top rushers**

- CHI – Walter Payton – 23 rushes, 92 yards, TD
- SDG – Earnest Jackson – 18 rushes, 59 yards

**Top receivers**

- CHI – Walter Payton – 4 receptions, 38 yards
- SDG – Bobby Duckworth – 3 receptions, 179 yards, TD

==== Week 15: at Denver Broncos ====
Week 15: San Diego Chargers at Denver Broncos – Game summary

Quarter	1	2	3	4	Total
Chargers	6	0	0	7	**13**
**Broncos**	0	6	7	3	**16**

at Mile High Stadium, Denver, Colorado

- Date: December 9
- Game time: 2:00 p.m. MST
- Game weather: 48 °F (8.9 °C), relative humidity 37%, wind 11 miles per hour (18 km/h; 9.6 kn)
- Game attendance: 74,867
- Referee: Jerry Markbreit
- TV announcers (NBC): Dick Enberg and Merlin Olsen
- Box score

Game information

**First quarter**

- SDG – Rolf Benirschke 42-yard field goal, 4:27. Chargers 3–0. **Drive: 6 plays, 18 yards, 2:16.**
- SDG – Rolf Benirschke 41-yard field goal, 3:21. Chargers 6–0. **Drive: 4 plays, 1 yard, 0:49.**

**Second quarter**

- DEN – Rich Karlis 30-yard field goal, 2:50. Chargers 6–3. **Drive: 12 plays, 52 yards, 6:36.**
- DEN – Rich Karlis 50-yard field goal, 0:00. Tied 6–6. **Drive: 8 plays, 33 yards, 1:40.**

**Third quarter**

- DEN – Sammy Winder 4-yard run (Rich Karlis kick), 7:46. Broncos 13–6. **Drive: 7 plays, 85 yards, 5:13.**

**Fourth quarter**

- SDG – Buford McGee 4-yard pass from Ed Luther (Rolf Benirschke kick), 13:41. Tied 13–13. **Drive: 4 plays, 1 yard, 0:05.**
- DEN – Rich Karlis 28-yard field goal, 2:08. Broncos 16–13. **Drive: 12 plays, 40 yards, 3:48.**

**Top passers**

- SDG – Ed Luther – 18/35, 171 yards, TD
- DEN – John Elway – 18/31, 193 yards, INT

**Top rushers**

- SDG – Earnest Jackson – 19 rushes, 68 yards
- DEN – Sammy Winder – 22 rushes, 90 yards, TD

**Top receivers**

- SDG – Pete Holohan – 4 receptions, 51 yards
- DEN – Steve Watson – 3 receptions, 40 yards

==== Week 16: vs. Kansas City Chiefs ====
Week 16: Kansas City Chiefs at San Diego Chargers – Game summary

Quarter	1	2	3	4	Total
**Chiefs**	14	14	14	0	**42**
Chargers	0	0	7	14	**21**

at Jack Murphy Stadium, San Diego, California

- Date: December 16
- Game time: 1:00 p.m. PST
- Game weather: 56 °F (13.3 °C), relative humidity 75%, wind 16 miles per hour (26 km/h; 14 kn)
- Game attendance: 40,221
- Referee: Bob Frederic
- TV announcers (NBC): Phil Stone and Dave Rowe
- Box score

Game information

**First quarter**

- KAN – Billy Jackson 3-yard run (Nick Lowery kick), 10:53. Chiefs 7–0. **Drive: 7 plays, 83 yards, 2:24.**
- KAN – Walt Arnold 4-yard pass from Bill Kenney (Nick Lowery kick), 4:20. Chiefs 14–0. **Drive: 6 plays, 73 yards, 2:19.**

**Second quarter**

- KAN – Henry Marshall 8-yard pass from Bill Kenney (Nick Lowery kick), 13:19. Chiefs 21–0. **Drive: 9 plays, 62 yards, 4:54.**
- KAN – Stephone Paige 65-yard pass from Bill Kenney (Nick Lowery kick), 1:10. Chiefs 28–0. **Drive: 3 plays, 65 yards, 0:40.**

**Third quarter**

- KAN – Herman Heard 3-yard run (Nick Lowery kick), 12:12. Chiefs 35–0. **Drive: 5 plays, 47 yards, 2:48.**
- KAN – Theotis Brown 2-yard run (Nick Lowery kick), 4:44. Chiefs 42–0. **Drive: 13 plays, 73 yards, 6:21.**
- SDG – Wes Chandler 15-yard pass from Ed Luther (Rolf Benirschke kick), 0:31. Chiefs 42–7. **Drive: 10 plays, 67 yards, 4:13.**

**Fourth quarter**

- SDG – Buford McGee 2-yard run (Rolf Benirschke kick), 6:01. Chiefs 42–14. **Drive: 13 plays, 82 yards, 7:33.**
- SDG – Buford McGee 3-yard run (Rolf Benirschke kick), 0:55. Chiefs 42–21. **Drive: 7 plays, 91 yards, 0:55.**

**Top passers**

- KAN – Bill Kenney – 17/23, 245 yards, 3 TD
- SDG – Ed Luther – 24/44, 333 yards, TD

**Top rushers**

- KAN – Herman Heard – 15 rushes, 84 yards, TD
- SDG – Earnest Jackson – 19 rushes, 79 yards

**Top receivers**

- KAN – Henry Marshall – 6 receptions, 84 yards, TD
- SDG – Eric Sievers – 4 receptions, 83 yards

== Awards ==
Earnest Jackson was the only Charger named to the AFC Pro Bowl squad, appearing as a backup; none were named first or second team All-Pro by the Associated Press.

=== Standings ===
AFC West
	W	L	T	PCT	DIV	CONF	PF	PA	STK
^{(2)} Denver Broncos	13	3	0	.813	6–2	10–2	353	241	W2
^{(4)} Seattle Seahawks	12	4	0	.750	5–3	8–4	418	282	L2
^{(5)} Los Angeles Raiders	11	5	0	.688	5–3	8–4	368	278	L1
Kansas City Chiefs	8	8	0	.500	4–4	7–7	314	324	W3
San Diego Chargers	7	9	0	.438	0–8	3–9	394	413	L2
