= Bob Gregor =

American football player (born 1957)

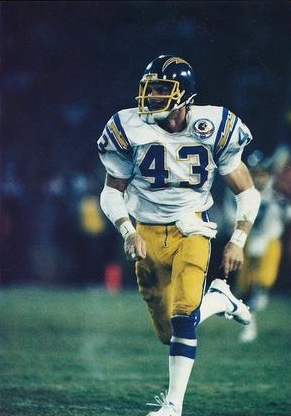
- Gregor with the San Diego Chargers c. 1984

No. 43
- Position: Defensive back

Personal information
- Born: February 10, 1957 (age 69); Riverside, California, U.S.
- Listed height: 6 ft 2 in (1.88 m)
- Listed weight: 192 lb (87 kg)

Career information
- High school: Monte Vista (Danville, California)
- College: Washington State
- NFL draft: 1980: 4th round, 108th overall pick

Career history
- San Diego Chargers (1980–1984)

Career NFL statistics
- Games played: 30
- Games started: 16
- Interceptions: 4
- Stats at Pro Football Reference

Robert Lee Gregor (born February 10, 1957) is an American former professional football player who was a defensive back for the San Diego Chargers of the National Football League (NFL). He played college football for the Washington State Cougars. He was selected by the Chargers in the fourth round of the 1980 NFL draft. After missing the 1980 season while on the injured reserve list, the hard-hitting Gregor started for San Diego the following three seasons, but he was sidelined by injuries each year.

== Early life ==
Gregor was born on February 10, 1957, in Riverside, California. He attended Monte Vista High School in Danville, where he played football as a flanker, cornerback and punter, and was named the team's most valuable player. He also excelled in basketball and track and field, earning all-league honors in the 100-yard dash and starring as a triple jumper.

== College career ==
Gregor was recruited to Washington State University by Cougars football head coach Jim Sweeney. Gregor spent five years with the Cougars, missing one season with injuries. A tough player, he played aggressively and sometimes recklessly. As a fifth-year senior in 1979, Gregor was called "one of the hardest hitters in this game", by Jim Walden, who by then was the Cougars' head coach. "Reckless, his hits hurt—sometimes himself", added the coach. According to Walden, "only injuries" prevented Gregor from being one of the top players in the Pac-10 Conference.

== Professional career ==
The San Diego Chargers selected Gregor with their second pick of the 1980 NFL draft, choosing him in the fourth round with the 108th overall pick. The Chargers had him rated as the top strong safety and 28th best player in the draft, which was counter to the NFL trend of valuing a defender's coverage skills over their hitting ability. However, he was placed on injured reserve before the 1980 season began due to shoulder and ankle injuries. San Diego head coach Don Coryell said that Gregor hit "so hard I don't know if [he] can last. Later, the team wanted to add him to their active roster midseason, but he would have needed to be placed on waivers, which Coryell said would be too risky, believing another club would claim him. The Chargers fell one game short of the Super Bowl that season, losing to Oakland in the AFC Championship Game. The defense was blamed for the loss, allowing a 28–7 lead to the Raiders before the offense rallied to within 34–27 with 6:52 remaining in the game. However, the defense was unable to get the ball back for an opportunity to tie and force overtime, as the Raiders' offense ran out the clock.

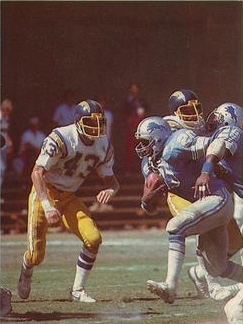
Gregor against Billy Sims (holding ball) and the Detroit Lions in 1981

Looking to improve their defense and reach the Super Bowl, San Diego hired Jack Pardee in 1981 as its new assistant head coach in charge of their defense. Renowned for using a variety of coverages, he replaced defensive coordinator Jackie Simpson, whose defense was criticized for being predictable. Pardee inherited a Chargers unit that ranked 18th out of 28 teams in points allowed per game (20.4) during the regular season, and surrendered 24 or more points seven times, including the playoffs. However, it also ranked sixth in yards allowed per game (293.2). Pardee named four new starters on defense. Only the cornerbacks remained the same in the secondary, with Gregor and Frank Duncan replacing Pete Shaw and Mike Fuller as safeties. With the height and range that Pardee desired, Gregor started the first six games at free safety. The team's second-leading tackler at the time, he was sidelined for the next 1 1/2 games by a pinched nerve in his neck, which hampered him for the rest of the season. San Diego's defense was among the NFL's worst, ranked 26th with 390 points allowed (24.4 per game) for the season along with a league-worst 269.4 yards passing per game. Their defensive backfield was much maligned. The Chargers were again denied a trip to the Super Bowl after losing to Cincinnati in a frigid AFC title game known as the Freezer Bowl.

Under new San Diego defensive coordinator Tom Bass in 1982, Gregor moved to strong safety. Chargers secondary coach Jim Wagstaff continued to suggest to Gregor that he curb his hitting intensity to reduce his injury risk. Coryell said that his safety "hits so hard, he maims himself. He's suicidal." In the season opener, Gregor and fellow safety Andre Young played a large part in forcing Denver into six turnovers. In the third game, Gregor dislocated his elbow against the Raiders, when he was reaching to strip the ball from a Raiders player and Chargers teammate Dewey Selmon ran through his arm. Gregor missed the next five games of the nine-game season, shortened by a strike that year.

In the 1983 season opener, Gregor was diagnosed with a concussion in a 41–29 loss to the New York Jets. Reflecting on his history, he called the injuries "frustrating". He added, "I've had my share of concussions. But considering the other possibilities, a concussion isn't that bad". Gregor started the season's first five games before a knee injury ended his season. The injury occurred against the New York Giants, which he started with his former college teammate Ken Greene at free safety, their first NFL start together. The injury was not initially considered to be season-ending, but he eventually underwent two arthroscopic surgeries. After Gregor appeared in just 23 games in three years as a starter, the Chargers attempted to increase his availability by starting Miles McPherson in his place in 1984. Nonetheless, Gregor's season ended after he tore ankle ligaments in week 7 against Kansas City and was placed on injured reserve.

After years of ranking among the worst defenses in the NFL, San Diego decided during the offseason to begin an extensive youth movement. On July 9, 1985, Gregor was among eight veterans, including six on defense, who were released. Jerry Magee of The San Diego Union wrote that "the slightly built Gregor ... played with a recklessness that was his own undoing."

== Later life ==
After his career in 2012, Gregor joined a concussion-related class-action lawsuit against the NFL. The lawsuit stated that due to repeated head impacts during his NFL career, "Gregor has experienced cognitive and other difficulties including, but not limited to headaches, dizziness, loss of memory, depression, suicidal thoughts, sleep problems, and neck and cervical arthritis and associated numbness/tingling." In 2015, a federal judge approved a settlement plan that could potentially cost the league $1 billion in payments to players over 65 years.

== See also ==
- Concussions in American football
- List of NFL players with chronic traumatic encephalopathy
