= Jesse Bendross =

American football player (born 1962)

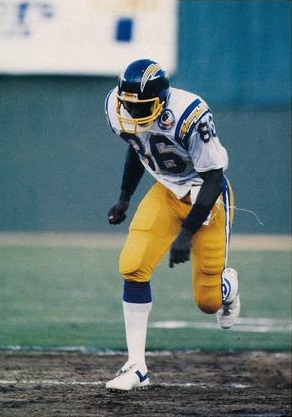
- Bendross in 1984

No. 86, 85
- Position: Wide receiver

Personal information
- Born: July 19, 1962 (age 64); Hollywood, Florida, U.S.
- Listed height: 6 ft 0 in (1.83 m)
- Listed weight: 196 lb (89 kg)

Career information
- High school: Miramar (Miramar, Florida)
- College: Alabama
- NFL draft: 1984: 7th round, 174th overall pick

Career history
- San Diego Chargers (1984–1985); Tampa Bay Buccaneers (1986)*; Philadelphia Eagles (1987)
- * Offseason or practice squad member only

Career NFL statistics
- Receptions: 27
- Receiving yards: 369
- Touchdowns: 2
- Stats at Pro Football Reference

Jesse Bendross (born July 19, 1962) is an American former professional football player who was a wide receiver in the National Football League (NFL). He played college football for the Alabama Crimson Tide and was selected in the seventh round of the 1984 NFL draft. He played in the NFL for the San Diego Chargers from 1984 to 1985 and for the Philadelphia Eagles in 1987.
