= Phil Stone =

American lawyer

Philip Avery Stone (23 February 1893 – 20 February 1967) also known as Phil Stone, was an attorney from Oxford, Mississippi, and mentor to William Faulkner. Educated at the University of Mississippi and Yale, Stone had a law office in Oxford, Mississippi and provided the services of his secretary to type and submit Faulkner's early literary works to magazines.

Although Stone nurtured Faulkner's early literary efforts, he did not entirely appreciate Faulkner's more mature works. As Faulkner's eminence as a writer grew, Stone became increasingly embittered.

Some of Phil Stone's papers are housed in the Special Collections Department of the University of Memphis Library.
