= Cliff Thrift =

American football player (born 1956)

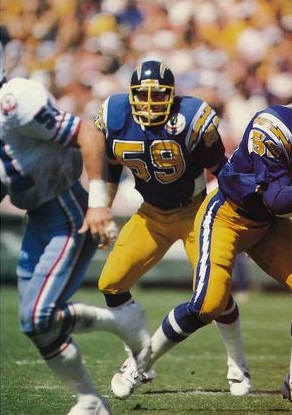
- Thrift in 1984

No. 59, 52
- Position: Linebacker

Personal information
- Born: May 3, 1956 (age 70); Dallas, Texas, U.S.
- Listed height: 6 ft 2 in (1.88 m)
- Listed weight: 232 lb (105 kg)

Career information
- High school: Purcell (OK)
- College: East Central
- NFL draft: 1979: 3rd round, 73rd overall pick

Career history
- San Diego Chargers (1979–1984); Chicago Bears (1985); Los Angeles Rams (1986)

Awards and highlights
- Super Bowl champion (XX)

Career NFL statistics
- Sacks: 2
- Fumble recoveries: 5
- Interceptions: 3
- Stats at Pro Football Reference

Clifford Thrift (born May 3, 1956) is an American former professional football player who was a linebacker for eight seasons in the National Football League (NFL) for the San Diego Chargers, Chicago Bears, and Los Angeles Rams. He played college football for the East Central Tigers.

Thrift attended Purcell High School in Purcell, Oklahoma and was a member of the 1972 Purcell Football Class A State Championship Team. He then attended East Central University in Ada, Oklahoma, before being drafted in the third round of the 1979 NFL draft. He was a part of the Bears team that won Super Bowl XX.
