= Ed Luther =

American football player (born 1957)

No. 11
- Position: Quarterback

Personal information
- Born: January 2, 1957 (age 69); Gardena, California, U.S.
- Listed height: 6 ft 3 in (1.91 m)
- Listed weight: 206 lb (93 kg)

Career information
- High school: St. Paul (Santa Fe Springs, California)
- College: San Jose State
- NFL draft: 1980: 4th round, 101st overall pick

Career history
- San Diego Chargers (1980–1984); Jacksonville Bulls (1985); Atlanta Falcons (1986)*; Indianapolis Colts (1986); Los Angeles Raiders (1987)*
- * Offseason or practice squad member only

Career NFL statistics
- Passing attempts: 460
- Passing completions: 245
- Completion percentage: 53.3%
- TD–INT: 12–23
- Passing yards: 3,187
- Passer rating: 63.2
- Stats at Pro Football Reference

Edward Augustine Luther (born January 2, 1957) is an American former professional football player who was a quarterback in the National Football League (NFL). He was selected by the San Diego Chargers in the fourth round of the 1980 NFL draft. He played college football for the San Jose State Spartans.

Luther was a backup quarterback behind Dan Fouts with the Chargers. He also played for the Indianapolis Colts and the Jacksonville Bulls in 1985 of the USFL.
