= Chuck Ehin =

American football player (1961–2025)

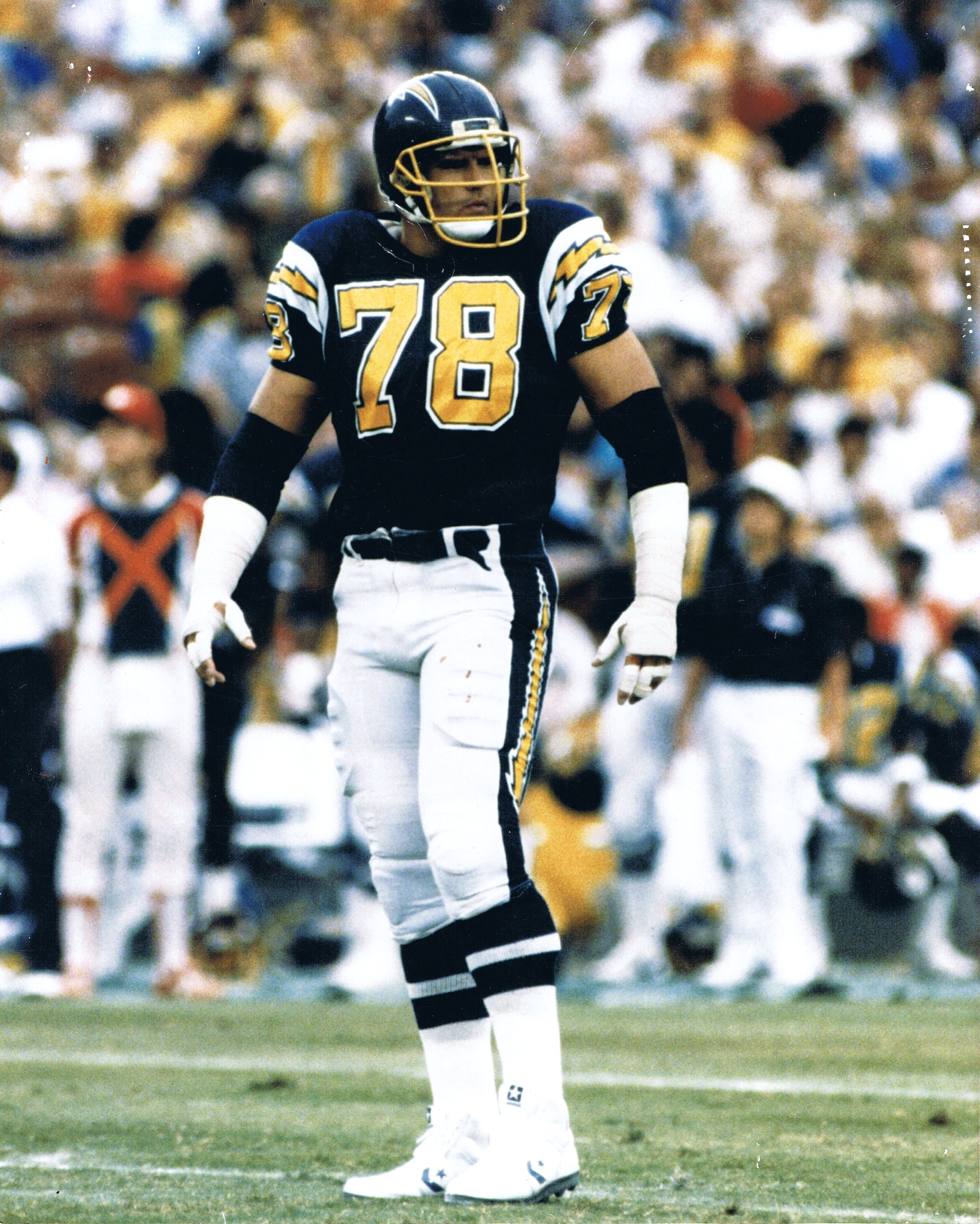

No. 78
- Positions: Defensive end, nose tackle

Personal information
- Born: July 1, 1961; Marysville, California, U.S.
- Died: April 29, 2025 (aged 63)
- Listed height: 6 ft 4 in (1.93 m)
- Listed weight: 261 lb (118 kg)

Career information
- High school: Layton (Layton, Utah)
- College: BYU
- NFL draft: 1983: 12th round, 329th overall pick

Career history
- San Diego Chargers (1983–1987); Indianapolis Colts (1989)*; Dallas Cowboys (1989)*
- * Offseason or practice squad member only

Career NFL statistics
- Sacks: 9.5
- Fumble recoveries: 4
- Stats at Pro Football Reference

Charles Kalev Ehin II (July 1, 1961 – April 29, 2025) was an American professional football defensive end and nose tackle in the National Football League (NFL). He was selected 329th overall by the San Diego Chargers in the 12th round of the 1983 NFL draft. He also played for the Indianapolis Colts and Dallas Cowboys. The first Estonian-American to play in the NFL, Ehin played college football at Brigham Young University, where he also earned a bachelor's degree in business. He graduated from Layton High School in Layton, Utah in 1979, and was listed among the 1979 National Top 100 High School athletes.

Ehin died from pancreatic cancer on April 29, 2025, at the age of 63.
