= Bobby Duckworth =

American football player (born 1958)

No. 82, 80
- Position: Wide receiver

Personal information
- Born: November 27, 1958 (age 67); Crossett, Arkansas, U.S.
- Listed height: 6 ft 3 in (1.91 m)
- Listed weight: 198 lb (90 kg)

Career information
- High school: Hamburg (Hamburg, Arkansas)
- College: Arkansas
- NFL draft: 1981: 6th round, 162nd overall pick

Career history
- San Diego Chargers (1981–1984); Los Angeles Rams (1985–1986); Philadelphia Eagles (1986)

Career NFL statistics
- Receptions: 82
- Receiving yards: 1,784
- Touchdowns: 13
- Stats at Pro Football Reference

Bobby Ray Duckworth (born November 27, 1958) is an American former professional football player who was a wide receiver in the National Football League (NFL) for the San Diego Chargers, Los Angeles Rams and Philadelphia Eagles. He played college football at the Arkansas Razorbacks and was selected 162nd overall in the sixth round of the 1981 NFL draft.

In his five seasons in the NFL, Duckworth caught 82 passes for 1,784 yards and 13 touchdowns.

In January 1992, Duckworth was sentenced to three years for the rape of a woman in his home in Carlsbad, California.
