= Linden King =

American football player (born 1955)

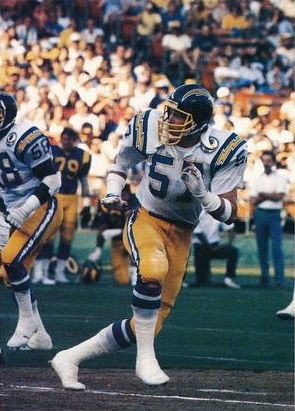
- King in 1984

No. 31, 57, 52
- Position: Linebacker

Personal information
- Born: June 28, 1955 (age 71); Memphis, Tennessee, U.S.
- Listed height: 6 ft 4 in (1.93 m)
- Listed weight: 241 lb (109 kg)

Career information
- High school: Air Academy (Air Force Academy, Colorado)
- College: Colorado State
- NFL draft: 1977: 3rd round, 77th overall pick

Career history
- San Diego Chargers (1978–1985); Los Angeles Raiders (1986–1989)

Career NFL statistics
- Sacks: 29.5
- Fumble recoveries: 12
- Interceptions: 8
- Stats at Pro Football Reference

Linden Keith King (born June 28, 1955) is an American former professional football player who was a linebacker for 13 seasons in the National Football League (NFL), including nine seasons for the San Diego Chargers and four for the Los Angeles Raiders. He played college football for the Colorado State Rams as a defensive back and linebacker, when he was known by his middle named as Keith King. He was inducted into the Colorado State University Athletics Hall of Fame in 1998.

King played in the north–south college all-star game and the Senior bowl. He was selected in the third round of the 1977 NFL draft by San Diego. He played as a strong safety and special teams player until he was switched to OLB in 1979. He became a starter in 1980 and played at the LOLB position till his release in 1986. His downtime was short however and he was on the field with the LA Raiders within a week of his departure. Linden became a starter two games into the 86 season and was the starting LOLB till his retirement in 1990.
