= Bill Elko =

American football player (born 1959)

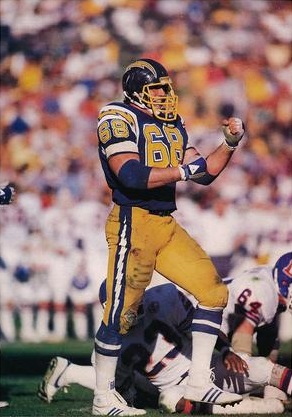
- Elko c. 1984

No. 90, 68, 96
- Position: Nose tackle

Personal information
- Born: December 28, 1959 (age 66); New York, New York, U.S.
- Listed height: 6 ft 5 in (1.96 m)
- Listed weight: 278 lb (126 kg)

Career information
- High school: Windber (Windber, Pennsylvania)
- College: Arizona State (1978–1979); LSU (1980–1982)
- NFL draft: 1983: 7th round, 192nd overall pick

Career history
- San Diego Chargers (1983–1984); Buffalo Bills (1986)*; Indianapolis Colts (1987)
- * Offseason or practice squad member only

Career NFL statistics
- Sacks: 3
- Fumble recoveries: 2
- Stats at Pro Football Reference

William Elko (born December 28, 1959) is an American former professional football player who was a nose tackle for three seasons in the National Football League (NFL) with the San Diego Chargers and Indianapolis Colts. He was selected by the Chargers in the seventh round of the 1983 NFL draft. Elko played college football for the Arizona State Sun Devils and LSU Tigers.

== Early life and college ==
William Elko was born on December 28, 1959, in New York, New York. He attended Windber High School in Windber, Pennsylvania.

Elko was a member of the Sun Devils of Arizona State University from 1978 to 1979 and was a letterman in 1979. He then transferred to play for the Tigers of Louisiana State University but was listed as ineligible during his first season there in 1980. He was then a two-year letterman from 1981 to 1982.

== Professional career ==
Elko was selected by the San Diego Chargers in the seventh round, with the 192nd overall pick, of the 1983 NFL draft. He officially signed with the team on July 11. He played in 11 games, starting three, during his rookie year in 1983, recording 0.5 sacks and one fumble recovery. He appeared in 15 games, starting 12, for the Chargers in 1984, totaling 1.5 sacks. Elko was moved to offensive line in 1985. He was released on August 26, 1985.

Elko signed with the Buffalo Bills on August 12, 1986. He was released on August 26, 1986.

He was signed by the Indianapolis Colts on April 7, 1987. He was released on September 7. On September 23, he was re-signed by the Colts during the 1987 NFL players strike. Elko played in three games, starting one as a nose tackle, accumulating one sack and one fumble recovery. He was released by the Colts on November 2, 1987.
