= Danny Walters (American football) =

American football player (born 1960)

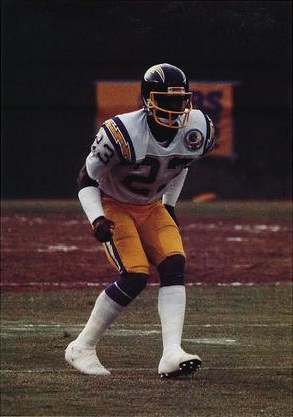
- Walters in 1984

No. 23
- Position: Cornerback

Personal information
- Born: November 4, 1960 (age 66); Prescott, Arkansas, U.S.
- Listed height: 6 ft 1 in (1.85 m)
- Listed weight: 189 lb (86 kg)

Career information
- High school: Julian (Chicago, Illinois)
- College: Arkansas
- NFL draft: 1983: 4th round, 95th overall pick

Career history
- San Diego Chargers (1983–1987)

Awards and highlights
- PFWA All-Rookie Team (1983); First-team All-SWC (1982)

Career NFL statistics
- Interceptions: 12
- INT return yards: 126
- Fumbles recovered: 1
- Stats at Pro Football Reference

Daniel Eugene Walters (born November 4, 1960) is an American former professional football player who was a cornerback for the San Diego Chargers of the National Football League (NFL). Walters played college football for the Arkansas Razorbacks and was chosen by the Chargers in the fourth round of the 1983 NFL draft.

== Early life ==
Walters was born on November 4, 1960, in Prescott, Arkansas. He graduated primary school at Julian High School in Chicago, Illinois, and college at the University of Arkansas in Fayetteville. From 1979 - 1982, he played football in the SWC where he is credited with 148 yards Rushing, 117 yards Receiving, 28 yards Passing, 7 Interceptions, and 2 Touchdowns for the Razorbacks. During Walters time with the Razorbacks, Lou Holtz was their head coach.

== Professional career ==
Walters was selected by the San Diego Chargers in the fourth round, 95th overall pick, of the 1983 NFL draft and held a starting position with them from 1983 to 1987. During Walters time with the Chargers, Don Coryell and Al Saunders were their head coaches.

== Arrest and aftermath ==
On Sept. 14, 1987, Walters was pulled over by police when his car was weaving. He was arrested and charged with possession of cocaine and driving under the influence of alcohol or a controlled substance. Two months later, the cocaine charge was suspended pending his completion of a drug education program. He was fined $750 for driving under the influence and ordered to complete 20 hours of community service.

In a December 11, 1987 interview with Bill Plaschke, LA Times Staff Writer, Walters said, "For a while, I tried to convince myself that this was a bad dream. Then I called my father (Herbert), who told me, 'Treat this like a bad play, like you just got beat. Forget about it.'" Walters frowned. "If only that's all this was."

Walters' conviction and a series of missed practices brought an end to his NFL career. The Chargers released him from his contract in 1988.

== See also ==
IMD - Danny Walters on 'Monday Night Football'
