= Andre Young (American football) =

American football player (born 1960)

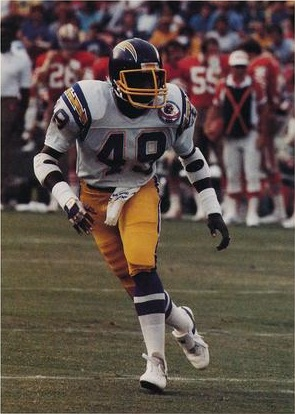
- Young in 1984

No. 49
- Position: Defensive back

Personal information
- Born: November 22, 1960 (age 65); West Monroe, Louisiana, U.S.
- Listed height: 6 ft 0 in (1.83 m)
- Listed weight: 199 lb (90 kg)

Career information
- High school: West Monroe
- College: Louisiana Tech
- NFL draft: 1982: 10th round, 273rd overall pick

Career history
- San Diego Chargers (1982–1984)

Awards and highlights
- First-team All-Southland Conference (1979, 1980)

Career NFL statistics
- Interceptions: 6
- Fumble recoveries: 4
- Touchdowns: 1
- Stats at Pro Football Reference

Andre Benoise Young (born November 22, 1960) is an American former professional football player who was a defensive back for two seasons for the San Diego Chargers of the National Football League (NFL). He played college football for the Louisiana Tech Bulldogs.

== Early life ==
While in middle school, Young played as a quarterback. He attended West Monroe High School in West Monroe, Louisiana, where he played offensive tackle and some tight end on the football team.

== College career ==
As a freshman at Louisiana Tech University, Young played weakside linebacker for the Bulldogs. He earned first-team all-Southland Conference honors as a sophomore in 1979 at defensive end. Young was moved to middle linebacker the following season and again earned a first-team all-conference selection. He changed positions once again as a senior; he was converted to a defensive back.

== Professional career ==
Young was selected in the tenth round (273rd overall) by the San Diego Chargers in the 1982 NFL draft. He started the preseason as the fifth-string strong safety. In an exhibition against the Dallas Cowboys, Young recorded four tackles, three assists, an interception, and a touchdown-saving pass deflection in two quarters of playing time. He earned a spot on the Chargers' final roster. In his NFL debut, Young forced a fumble, recovered two fumbles, and intercepted a pass from Craig Morton in their season-opening win over the Denver Broncos, with the Los Angeles Times saying that "there couldn't have been a more unlikely defensive star."

On October 9, 1983, Young picked off Jim Zorn and returned it 40 yards for a touchdown to help the Chargers beat the Seattle Seahawks 28–21. It was both his first touchdown as a pro, and his first since high school. In the 1984 season opener, Young recorded two interceptions to help the Chargers defeat the Minnesota Vikings, 42–13. He was waived by the Chargers on July 9, 1985.
