= 1984 Los Angeles Rams season =

NFL team season

- Owner: Georgia Frontiere
- Head coach: John Robinson
- Offensive coordinator: Jimmy Raye
- Defensive coordinator: Fritz Shurmur
- Home stadium: Anaheim Stadium

Results
- Record: 10–6
- Division place: 2nd NFC West
- Playoffs: Lost Wild Card Playoffs (vs. Giants) 13–16

Uniform
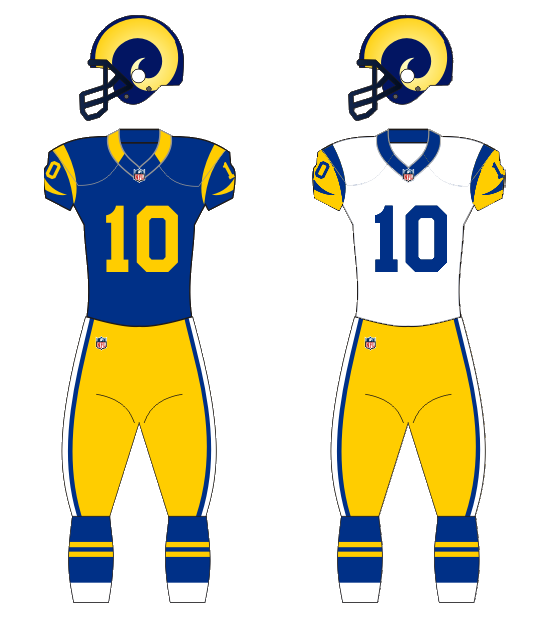

The 1984 Los Angeles Rams season was the franchise's 47th season in the National Football League, their 48th overall, and their 39th in the Greater Los Angeles Area. The Rams looked to improve on their 9–7 record from 1983 and make the playoffs for the second consecutive season and 10th in the last 12. They improved on their record by one game, going 10–6, good enough for second place in the NFC West behind the 15–1 San Francisco 49ers. In the playoffs, the Rams lost a low-scoring game to the New York Giants at home, 16–13. During this season, second-year running back Eric Dickerson set the NFL record for most rushing yards in a season, with 2,105 yards.

Prior to the season in February 1984, starting cornerback Kirk Collins died of gastroesophageal cancer. Rams teammates would honor Collins during the season by placing a "42" decal on the rear of their helmets.

== Before the season ==
=== NFL draft ===
1984 Los Angeles Rams draft
Round	Pick	Player	Position	College	Notes
5	133	Hal Stephens	Defensive end	East Carolina	
7	188	George Radachowsky	Defensive back	Boston College	
8	215	Ed Brady	Linebacker	Illinois	
9	242	George Reynolds	Punter	Penn State	
10	253	Norwood Vann	Linebacker	East Carolina	
10	274	Joe Dooley	Center	Ohio State	
11	293	Michael Harper	Wide receiver	USC	
11	301	Dwayne Love	Running back	Houston	
12	309	Rod Fisher	Defensive back	Oklahoma State	
12	328	Moe Bias	Linebacker	Illinois	
Made roster

== Roster ==
1984 Los Angeles Rams roster
Quarterbacks (QB): 8 Steve Dils; 15 Vince Ferragamo; 9 Jeff Kemp; Running backs (RB): 45 Dwayne Crutchfield; 29 Eric Dickerson; 44 Mike Guman; 46 John Kamana; 30 Barry Redden; Wide receivers (WR): 89 Ron Brown; 80 Henry Ellard; 84 George Farmer; 87 Drew Hill; Tight ends (TE): 86 Mike Barber; 81 David Hill; 83 James McDonald	Offensive linemen (OL): 62 Bill Bain T; 73 Russ Bolinger G; 60 Dennis Harrah G; 72 Kent Hill G; 75 Irv Pankey T; 64 Joe Shearin C/G; 56 Doug Smith C; Defensive linemen (DL): 70 Charles DeJurnett NT; 71 Reggie Doss DE; 77 Gary Jeter DE; 69 Greg Meisner NT; 93 Doug Reed DE; 66 Booker Reese DE; 85 Jack Youngblood DE	Linebackers (LB): 90 Ed Brady ILB; 50 Jim Collins ILB; 55 Carl Ekern ILB; 59 Mark Jerue ILB; 57 Jim Laughlin ILB; 58 Mel Owens OLB; 51 Norwood Vann OLB; 54 Mike Wilcher OLB; 53 Jim Youngblood OLB; Defensive backs (DB): 28 David Croudip CB; 27 Gary Green CB; 47 LeRoy Irvin CB; 20 Johnnie Johnson FS; 22 Vince Newsome SS; 43 Mike Pleasant CB; 37 Ivory Sully SS; Special teams (ST): 1 Mike Lansford K; 63 Mike McDonald LS; 6 John Misko P	Reserve: 52 George Andrews LB (IR); 96 Doug Barnett LS (IR); 21 Nolan Cromwell S (IR); 88 Chris Faulkner TE (NF-Ill.); -- Rod Fisher CB (IR); 82 Otis Grant WR (IR); 26 Eric Harris S (IR); 24 A. J. Jones RB (IR); 68 Gary Kowalski T (IR); -- Dan McQuaid T/G (IR); 98 Shawn Miller NT (IR); 78 Jackie Slater T (IR); 61 Tony Slaton C (IR); -- Hal Stephens DE (IR); -- Scott Tinsley QB (IR); Rookies in italics

== Regular season ==
=== Eric Dickerson ===
In his second season, Dickerson continued his onslaught of the NFL record book. As a rookie, Dickerson established rookie records for most rushing attempts (390), most rushing yards gained (1,808) and most touchdowns rushing (18), including another two receiving touchdowns. His efforts earned him All-Pro, Pro Bowl, Player of the Year and Rookie of the Year honors.

Eleven times during the 1984 season, he gained more than 100 yards rushing, breaking the record of 100-yard games in a season held by O. J. Simpson. His 2,105 total yards rushing in the 1984 NFL season beat Simpson’s 1973 NFL season record of 2,003 yards rushing in a single season. To date, no one has rushed for more yards in a single NFL season. However, Simpson’s career high rushing total came in a 14-game season, whereas Dickerson’s mark was set during a 16-game season. Dickerson broke OJ’s record with a 215-yard performance in a 27–16 Rams win over the Houston Oilers in week 15.

=== Schedule ===
Week	Date	Opponent	Result	Record	Venue	Recap
1	September 3	Dallas Cowboys	**L** 13–20	0–1	Anaheim Stadium	Recap
2	September 9	Cleveland Browns	**W** 20–17	1–1	Anaheim Stadium	Recap
3	September 16	at Pittsburgh Steelers	**L** 14–24	1–2	Three Rivers Stadium	Recap
4	September 23	at Cincinnati Bengals	**W** 24–14	2–2	Riverfront Stadium	Recap
5	September 30	New York Giants	**W** 33–12	3–2	Anaheim Stadium	Recap
6	October 7	**Atlanta Falcons**	**L** 28–30	3–3	Anaheim Stadium	Recap
7	October 14	at **New Orleans Saints**	**W** 28–10	4–3	Louisiana Superdome	Recap
8	October 22	at **Atlanta Falcons**	**W** 24–10	5–3	Atlanta-Fulton County Stadium	Recap
9	October 28	**San Francisco 49ers**	**L** 0–33	5–4	Anaheim Stadium	Recap
10	November 4	at St. Louis Cardinals	**W** 16–3	6–4	Busch Stadium	Recap
11	November 11	Chicago Bears	**W** 29–13	7–4	Anaheim Stadium	Recap
12	November 18	at Green Bay Packers	**L** 6–31	7–5	Milwaukee County Stadium	Recap
13	November 25	at Tampa Bay Buccaneers	**W** 34–33	8–5	Tampa Stadium	Recap
14	December 2	**New Orleans Saints**	**W** 34–21	9–5	Anaheim Stadium	Recap
15	December 9	Houston Oilers	**W** 27–16	10–5	Anaheim Stadium	Recap
16	December 14	at **San Francisco 49ers**	**L** 16–19	10–6	Candlestick Park	Recap
Note: Intra-division opponents are in **bold** text.

=== Week 1 ===
In this Monday Night opener, Rams got off to a 13–0 first-quarter lead with Eric Dickerson running for a touchdown, but the Cowboys stormed back behind 343 passing yards by new QB Gary Hogeboom and a defense that held Vince Ferragamo to 11 pass completions in 33 attempts and just 84 yards, and intercepted 5 passes.

=== Week 2 ===
Mike Lansford kicked a late FG to win it. Dickerson had 102 yards rushing and CB Leroy Irvin returned a pickoff 81 yards for a touchdown.

=== Week 3 ===
Steelers defense held Dickerson to 49 yards and got 2 passing touchdowns from David Woodley. Ferragamo threw 2 more INT's, giving him eight in three games. He was injured in this game & replaced by Jeff Kemp, who would be the starter for the rest of the season.

Starting QBs: Los Angeles Rams: Vince Ferragamo vs Pittsburgh Steelers: David Woodley.

Vegas Line: Pittsburgh Steelers -3.5

Over/Under 43.0 (under)

  - Vince Ferragamo was injured (hand) during the first half and replaced by Jeff Kemp. **
Los Angeles Rams (1-1) at Pittsburgh Steelers (1-1)

Team	1	2	3	4	Total
Rams	7	0	7	0	14
• Steelers	0	14	3	7	24

- Date: Sep 16, 1984
- Location: Three Rivers Stadium - Pittsburgh, Pennsylvania
- Game start: 4:00pm EST
- Game weather: 50 °F (10 °C) • 7 miles per hour (11 km/h; 6.1 kn)
- Referee: Ben Dreith
- TV announcers (NFL on CBS): Jim Hill (American football) and John Dockery

=== Week 4 ===
Dickerson ran for a touchdown and Kemp passed for another. Bengals scored late on a touchdown pass from Ken Anderson to Cris Collinsworth and tried an onside kick, but Mike Guman scooped it up and ran for the final touchdown.

=== Week 5 ===
Team	1	2	3	4	Total
Giants	6	0	0	6	12
• Rams	0	17	16	0	33

- Date: September 30
- Location: Anaheim Stadium, Anaheim, California
- Game start: 4:00 p.m.
- Game weather: 70 °F (21.1 °C); humidity 73%; wind 11 miles per hour (18 km/h; 9.6 kn)
- Referee: Gordon McCarter
- TV announcers (CBS): Frank Glieber and Dick Vermeil

Scoring summary
Q1	NYG	Phil McConkey Special teams recovery in end zone on opening kickoff. Receiving team did not touch ball.	NYG 6–0
Q2	LA	Dwayne Crutchfield 1 yard rush (Mike Lansford kick)	LA 7–6
Q2	LA	Henry Ellard 83 yard punt return (Mike Lansford kick)	LA 14–6
Q2	LA	Mike Lansford 33 yard field goal	LA 17–6
Q3	LA	Safety, Ivory Sully blocked punt out of end zone	LA 19–6
Q3	LA	Safety, Reggie Doss and Jack Youngblood tackled Phil Simms in end zone	LA 21–6
Q3	LA	David Hill 2 yard pass from Jeff Kemp (Mike Lansford kick)	LA 28–6
Q3	LA	Mike Lansford 35 yard field goal	LA 31–6
Q3	LA	Safety, Norwood Vann blocked punt out of end zone	LA 33–6
Q4	NYG	Earnest Gray 15 yard pass from Phil Simms	LA 33–12

Rams’ defense tied an NFL-record by scoring three safeties. They also held the Giants to 8 yards rushing. Henry Ellard returned a punt 83 yards for a touchdown, and Kemp continued to play mistake-free football, passing for another touchdown. The Rams also became the most recent NFL team (the last one prior was before 1940) to score three safeties in one game as they easily defeat Phil Simms and the Giants.

=== Week 6 ===
The game lead changed six times in the second half. The Falcons won on three rushing touchdowns by Lynn Cain and a late FG by Mick Luckhurst.

=== Week 7 ===
Dickerson ran for 175 yards. Kemp completed only 8 passes, but three were for touchdowns. Nolan Cromwell had an interception return touchdown.

=== Week 8 ===
Rams got revenge on the road against the Falcons as Dickerson ran for 145 yards and a touchdown and Ellard caught a pass and returned another punt for touchdowns.

==== Week 9 (Sunday, October 28, 1984): vs. San Francisco 49ers ====
Week 9: San Francisco 49ers at Los Angeles Rams

Quarter	1	2	3	4	Total
49ers (8–1)	3	16	7	7	**33**
Rams (5–4)	0	0	0	0	**0**

at Anaheim Stadium • Anaheim, California

- Date: October 28, 1984
- Game time: 1:00 p.m. PST
- Game weather: 60 °F (16 °C); wind 7 miles per hour (11 km/h; 6.1 kn)
- Game attendance: 65,481
- Referee: Bob Frederic
- TV announcers (CBS): Tom Brookshier (play-by-play) and Wayne Walker (color commentator)

Team	Category	Player	Statistics
SF	Passing	Joe Montana	21/31, 365 YDS, 3 TDs
SF	Rushing	Wendell Tyler	13 CAR, 27 YDS
SF	Receiving	Freddie Solomon	6 REC, 94 YDS, 1 TD
LARams	Passing	Jeff Kemp	14/30, 180 YDS, 2 INTs
LARams	Rushing	Eric Dickerson	13 CAR, 38 YDS
LARams	Receiving	Henry Ellard	4 REC, 91 YDS

Scoring summary

Quarter	Time	Drive			Team	Scoring information	Score	
Quarter	Time	Plays	Yards	TOP	Team	Scoring information	SF	LARams
1	10:22				49ers	46-yard field goal by Wersching	3	0
2	7:17				49ers	46-yard field goal by Wersching	6	0
2	4:30				49ers	Craig 64-yard touchdown reception from Montana, Wersching kick no good (pass)	12	0
2	2:38				49ers	Solomon 6-yard touchdown reception from Montana, Wersching kick good	19	0
3	3:11				49ers	Craig 6-yard touchdown run, Wersching kick good	26	0
4	7:02				49ers	Clark 44-yard touchdown reception from Montana, Wersching kick good	33	0
"TOP" = time of possession. For other American football terms, see Glossary of American football.							33	0

- Point spread: 49ers by 3
- Over/under: 45.0 **(under)**
- Time of game:

49ers	Game statistics	Rams
23	First downs	12
39–111	Rushes–yards	19–72
376	Passing yards	180
22–32–0	Passes	14–30–2
2–15	Sacked–yards	5–46
361	Net passing yards	134
472	Total yards	206
35	Return yards	123
3–38.0	Punts	6–39.8
2–2	Fumbles–lost	5–3
6–41	Penalties–yards	3–25
34:26	Time of Possession	25:34

The 49ers got 376 yards passing and 3 touchdowns from Joe Montana. Dickerson was held to 38 rushing yards.

=== Week 10 ===
Kemp only completed 5 of 14 passes with one touchdown to Ron Brown and Dickerson rushed for 208 yards; Dickerson accounted for almost all of the Rams' 261 yards of offense. Lansford kicked a FG late to win the game as the Rams defense sacked Neil Lomax six times, three by veteran Jack Youngblood

=== Week 11 ===
Rams continued their playoff push by overcoming a 10–0 deficit behind 149 yards and 2 touchdowns by Dickerson.

=== Week 12 ===
Eddie Lee Ivery ran for 3 touchdowns and Tim Lewis returned an interception 99 yards for another.

=== Week 13 ===
In a wild affair at Tampa, the Rams overcame 322 yards passing by Steve DeBerg and scored 17 4th quarter points. The Rams rushed for 299 yards, 191 by Dickerson along with 3 touchdowns.

=== Week 14 ===
Rams built a 24–7 halftime lead and cruised behind 2 Kemp touchdown passes and 149 yards and a touchdown from Dickerson.

=== Week 15 ===
Week Fifteen: Houston Oilers (3–11) at Los Angeles Rams (9–5)

Quarter	1	2	3	4	Total
Oilers	3	10	3	0	**16**
**Rams**	17	3	0	7	**27**

at Anaheim Stadium, Anaheim, California

- Date: December 9, 1984
- Game time: 1:00 p.m. PST
- Game weather: Sunny, 58 °F (14 °C)
- Game attendance: 49,092
- Referee: Fred Silva
- TV: NBC
- Pro-Football-Reference.com, The Football Database

Game information

**First quarter**

- LA – Drew Hill 57-yard pass from Jeff Kemp (Mike Lansford kick), 13:08. Rams 7–0. Drive:
- HOU – Joe Cooper 21-yard field goal, 7:22. Rams 7–3. Drive:
- LA – Eric Dickerson 7-yard run (Mike Lansford kick), 4:28. Rams 14–3. Drive:
- LA – Mike Lansford 35-yard field goal, 1:42. Rams 17–3. Drive:

**Second quarter**

- HOU – Joe Cooper 42-yard field goal, 13:19. Rams 17–6. Drive:
- HOU – Larry Moriarty 4-yard run (Joe Cooper kick), 6:13. Rams 17–13. Drive:
- LA – Mike Lansford 19-yard field goal, 2:26. Rams 20–13. Drive:

**Third quarter**

- HOU – Joe Cooper 18 yard field goal, 7:50. Rams 20–16. Drive:

**Fourth quarter**

- LA – Eric Dickerson 6–yard run, 5:49. Rams 27–16. Drive:

Top passers

- HOU – Warren Moon – 19/29, 200 yards, INT
- LA – Jeff Kemp – 12/23, 199 yards, TD

Top rushers

- HOU – Larry Moriarty – 24 rushes, 102 yards, TD
- LA – Eric Dickerson – 27 rushes, 215 yards, 2 TD

Top receivers

- HOU – Tim Smith – 6 receptions, 69 yards
- LA – Drew Hill – 1 reception, 57 yards, TD

The Rams clinched a wild-card playoff berth and Dickerson surpassed O. J. Simpson's NFL single-season rushing record by rushing for a season-high 215 yards.

- Eric Dickerson sets NFL single season rushing record in the game.
- Jack Youngblood missed his first NFL game due to injury in his career.

==== Week 16 (Friday, December 14, 1984): at San Francisco 49ers ====
Week 16: Los Angeles Rams at San Francisco 49ers

Quarter	1	2	3	4	Total
Rams (10–6)	3	10	0	3	**16**
49ers (15–1)	14	3	0	2	**19**

at Candlestick Park • San Francisco, California

- Date: December 14, 1984
- Game time: 6:00 p.m. PST
- Game weather: 51 °F (11 °C); wind 13 miles per hour (21 km/h; 11 kn)
- Game attendance: 59,743
- Referee: Jerry Seeman
- TV announcers (ABC): Frank Gifford (play-by-play), Don Meredith (color commentator) and O. J. Simpson (color commentator)

Team	Category	Player	Statistics
LARams	Passing	Jeff Kemp	11/22, 180 YDS
LARams	Rushing	Eric Dickerson	26 CAR, 98 YDS, 1 TD
LARams	Receiving	Ron Brown	3 REC, 55 YDS
SF	Passing	Joe Montana	20/31, 219 YDS, 2 TDs
SF	Rushing	Roger Craig	8 CAR, 59 YDS
SF	Receiving	Earl Cooper	5 REC, 40 YDS, 1 TD

Scoring summary

Quarter	Time	Drive			Team	Scoring information	Score	
Quarter	Time	Plays	Yards	TOP	Team	Scoring information	LARams	SF
1	10:35				Rams	46-yard field goal by Lansford	3	0
2	8:14				49ers	Solomon 47-yard touchdown reception from Montana, Wersching kick good	3	7
1	0:58				49ers	Cooper 1-yard touchdown reception from Montana, Wersching kick good	3	14
2	14:05				49ers	38-yard field goal by Wersching	3	17
2	7:50				Rams	Dickerson 4-yard touchdown run, Lansford kick good	10	17
2	0:00				Rams	28-yard field goal by Lansford	13	17
4	4:43				Rams	42-yard field goal by Lansford	16	17
4	1:06	—	—	—	49ers	Kemp tackled in the end zone by Johnson for a safety	16	19
"TOP" = time of possession. For other American football terms, see Glossary of American football.							16	19

- Point spread: 49ers by 6
- Over/under: 44.0 **(under)**
- Time of game:

Rams	Game statistics	49ers
19	First downs	15
37–185	Rushes–yards	20–89
180	Passing yards	219
11–22–0	Passes	20–31–0
1–10	Sacked–yards	4–19
170	Net passing yards	200
355	Total yards	289
95	Return yards	88
4–37.8	Punts	6–44.5
2–1	Fumbles–lost	2–0
6–57	Penalties–yards	8–75
32:52	Time of Possession	27:08

The 49ers got two early touchdown passes from Montana and held off a late Ram charge for the win, culminating in a sack for a safety by Gary "Big Hands" Johnson. With this win, the 49ers became the first team in NFL history to win 15 games in an NFL regular season.

== Postseason ==
Week	Date	Opponent	Result	Record	Venue	Recap
Wild Card	December 23	New York Giants	L 13–16	0–1	Anaheim Stadium	Recap

=== Standings ===
NFC West
	W	L	T	PCT	DIV	CONF	PF	PA	STK
San Francisco 49ers^{(1)}	15	1	0	.938	6–0	12–0	475	227	W9
Los Angeles Rams^{(4)}	10	6	0	.625	3–3	7–5	346	316	L1
New Orleans Saints	7	9	0	.438	1–5	4–8	298	361	W1
Atlanta Falcons	4	12	0	.250	2–4	3–9	281	382	W1

== Awards and honors ==
- Eric Dickerson, NFC Pro Bowl Selection
- Eric Dickerson, All-Pro Selection
- Eric Dickerson, UPI NFC Player of the Year

=== Milestones ===
- Eric Dickerson, NFL Record 2,105 Rushing Yards in a Single Season

== See also ==
Other Anaheim–based teams in 1984

- California Angels (Anaheim Stadium)
  - 1984 California Angels season
