= 1983 Los Angeles Rams season =

NFL team season

- Owner: Georgia Frontiere
- Head coach: John Robinson
- Offensive coordinator: Jimmy Raye
- Defensive coordinator: Fritz Shurmur
- Home stadium: Anaheim Stadium

Results
- Record: 9–7
- Division place: 2nd NFC West
- Playoffs: Won Wild Card Playoffs (at Cowboys) 24–17; Lost Divisional Playoffs (at Redskins) 7–51

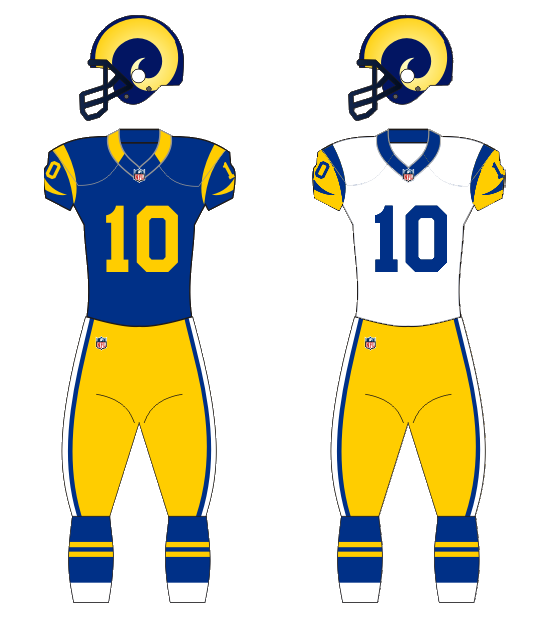

The 1983 Los Angeles Rams season was the team's 46th year with the National Football League and the 38th season in the city of Los Angeles. The franchise drafted a future Hall of Fame Running Back in Eric Dickerson. The season saw the team attempt to improve on its 2–7 record from 1982. The team started out 5–2 before splitting their next 4 games and then lost at home to Washington to sit at 7–5. They would split their last 4 games to finish 9–7 and make the playoffs for the first time since 1980 after a 2-year absence. In the playoffs, they defeated the Cowboys 24–17 in Dallas to advance to the divisional round. However, in the game, the Rams were annihilated 51–7 by the Redskins, who would move on to the Super Bowl, only to lose to the other Los Angeles NFL team, the Los Angeles Raiders, 38–9.

== Offseason ==
=== NFL draft ===
1983 Los Angeles Rams draft
Round	Pick	Player	Position	College	Notes
1	2	Eric Dickerson * ^{†}	Running back	Southern Methodist	
2	32	Henry Ellard *	Wide receiver	Fresno State	
2	36	Mike Wilcher	Linebacker	North Carolina	
Made roster † Pro Football Hall of Fame * Made at least one Pro Bowl during career

== Personnel ==
=== Staff / Coaches ===
1983 Los Angeles Rams staff
Front office: Owner/President – Georgia Frontiere; Administrator of Football Operations – Jack Faulkner; Director of player personnel – John Math; Head coaches: Head coach – John Robinson; Offensive coaches: Offensive coordinator – Jimmy Raye; Quarterbacks – Bob Baker; Running Backs – Bruce Snyder; Offensive Line – Hudson Houck	Defensive coaches: Defensive Line – Marv Goux; Assistant Defensive Line – Larry Brooks; Inside Linebackers – Fritz Shurmur; Outside Linebackers – Fred Whittingham; Defensive Backs – Steve Shafer; Special teams coaches: Special Teams – Gil Haskell

=== Roster ===
1983 Los Angeles Rams roster
Quarterbacks (QB): 15 Vince Ferragamo; 4 Steve Fuller; 9 Jeff Kemp; Running backs (RB): 29 Eric Dickerson; 44 Mike Guman; 24 A. J. Jones; 30 Barry Redden; Wide receivers (WR): 88 Preston Dennard; 80 Henry Ellard; 84 George Farmer; 82 Otis Grant; Tight ends (TE): 86 Mike Barber; 81 David Hill; 83 James McDonald	Offensive linemen (OL): 62 Bill Bain T; 73 Russ Bolinger G; 60 Dennis Harrah G; 72 Kent Hill G; 68 Gary Kowalski T; 64 Joe Shearin G; 78 Jackie Slater T; 56 Doug Smith C; Defensive linemen (DL): 96 Doug Barnett DE; 70 Charles DeJurnett NT; 71 Reggie Doss DE; 77 Gary Jeter DE; 67 Myron Lapka NT; 69 Greg Meisner NT; 85 Jack Youngblood DE	Linebackers (LB): 52 George Andrews OLB; 54 Howard Carson ILB; 50 Jim Collins ILB; 55 Carl Ekern ILB; 59 Mark Jerue ILB; 51 Dave Lewis OLB; 58 Mel Owens OLB; 94 Mike Wilcher OLB; 66 Eric Williams ILB; 53 Jim Youngblood ILB; Defensive backs (DB): 21 Nolan Cromwell SS; 26 Eric Harris CB; 47 LeRoy Irvin CB; 20 Johnnie Johnson FS; 22 Vince Newsome FS; 37 Ivory Sully SS; 28 Mike Williams; Special teams (ST): 1 Mike Lansford K; 6 John Misko P; 13 Chuck Nelson K	Reserve: 31 Robert Alexander RB (IR); 42 Kirk Collins CB (NF-Ill.); 85 Drew Hill WR (IR); 25 Gordon Jones WR (IR); 75 Irv Pankey T (IR); 93 Doug Reed DE (IR); 57 Mike Reilly LB (Susp.); Rookies in italics

== Regular season ==
=== Eric Dickerson ===
While he considered going to the Los Angeles Express in the United States Football League, Dickerson decided to go into the National Football League at the advice of his mother because the NFL had been around longer. He was selected second overall in the 1983 NFL draft by the Los Angeles Rams. An immediate pro success, he established rookie records for most rushing attempts (390), most rushing yards gained (1,808) and most touchdowns rushing (18), including another two receiving touchdowns. His efforts earned him All-Pro, Pro Bowl, Player of the Year and Rookie of the Year honors.

=== Schedule ===
Week	Date	Opponent	Result	Record	Venue	Attendance
1	September 4	at New York Giants	**W** 16–6	1–0	Giants Stadium	75,281
2	September 11	**New Orleans Saints**	**W** 30–27	2–0	Anaheim Stadium	45,572
3	September 18	at Green Bay Packers	**L** 24–27	2–1	Milwaukee County Stadium	54,037
4	September 25	at New York Jets	**L** 24–27	2–2	Shea Stadium	52,070
5	October 2	Detroit Lions	**W** 21–10	3–2	Anaheim Stadium	49,403
6	October 9	at **San Francisco 49ers**	**W** 10–7	4–2	Candlestick Park	59,118
7	October 16	**Atlanta Falcons**	**W** 27–21	5–2	Anaheim Stadium	50,404
8	October 23	**San Francisco 49ers**	**L** 35–45	5–3	Anaheim Stadium	66,070
9	October 30	at Miami Dolphins	**L** 14–30	5–4	Miami Orange Bowl	72,175
10	November 6	Chicago Bears	**W** 21–14	6–4	Anaheim Stadium	53,010
11	November 14	at **Atlanta Falcons**	**W** 36–13	7–4	Atlanta–Fulton County Stadium	31,202
12	November 20	Washington Redskins	**L** 20–42	7–5	Anaheim Stadium	63,031
13	November 27	Buffalo Bills	**W** 41–17	8–5	Anaheim Stadium	48,246
14	December 4	at Philadelphia Eagles	**L** 9–13	8–6	Veterans Stadium	32,867
15	December 11	New England Patriots	**L** 7–21	8–7	Anaheim Stadium	46,503
16	December 18	at **New Orleans Saints**	**W** 26–24	9–7	Louisiana Superdome	70,148
Note: Intra-division opponents are in **bold** text.

=== September 25, 1983 ===
==== Week 4: Los Angeles Rams 24, New York Jets 27 ====
Game summary

Quarter	1	2	3	4	OT	Total
Rams	14	0	3	7	0	**24**
Jets	7	7	7	3	3	**27**

at Shea Stadium, Flushing, New York

- Game time: 4:00 p.m. EST
- Game weather: 60 °F (16 °C)
- Referee: Fred Silva
- TV announcers (CBS): Pat Summerall and John Madden

=== Playoffs ===
Round	Date	Opponent (seed)	Result	Record	Venue	Attendance
Wildcard	December 26	at Dallas Cowboys (4)	**W** 24–17	1–0	Texas Stadium	62,118
Divisional	January 1, 1984	at Washington Redskins (1)	**L** 7–51	1–1	RFK Stadium	55,363

=== December 26, 1983 ===
==== NFC: Los Angeles Rams 24, Dallas Cowboys 17 ====
Game summary

Quarter	1	2	3	4	Total
**Rams**	7	0	7	10	**24**
Cowboys	0	7	3	7	**17**

at Texas Stadium, Irving, Texas

- Game time: 12:30 p.m. EST/11:30 a.m. CST
- Game weather: 27 °F (−3 °C), mostly cloudy
- Game attendance: 62,118
- Referee: Gordon McCarter
- TV announcers (CBS): Pat Summerall and John Madden

Game information
- **Scoring**
  - LA – D. Hill 18 pass from Ferragamo (Lansford kick) RAMS 7–0
  - DAL – T. Hill 14 pass from White (Septien kick) 7–7
  - DAL – field goal Septien 41 DAL 10–7
  - LA – Dennard 16 pass from Ferragamo (Lansford kick) RAMS 14–10
  - LA – Farmer 8 pass from Ferragamo (Lansford kick) RAMS 21–10
  - LA – field goal Lansford 20 RAMS 24–10
  - DAL – Cosbie 2 pass from White (Septien kick) RAMS 24–17

=== January 1, 1984 ===
==== NFC: Washington Redskins 51, Los Angeles Rams 7 ====
Game summary

Quarter	1	2	3	4	Total
Rams	0	7	0	0	**7**
**Redskins**	17	21	6	7	**51**

at Robert F. Kennedy Memorial Stadium, Washington, D.C.

- Game time: 12:30 p.m. EST
- Game weather: 38 °F (3 °C), mostly cloudy
- Game attendance: 54,440
- Referee: Ben Dreith
- TV announcers (CBS): Pat Summerall and John Madden

Game information
- **Scoring**
  - WAS – Riggins 3 run (Moseley kick)WAS 7–0
  - WAS – Monk 40 pass from Theismann (Moseley kick) 14–0
  - WAS – field goal Moseley 42 WAS 17–0
  - WAS – Riggins 1 run (Moseley kick) WAS 24–0
  - LA – Dennard 32 pass from Ferragamo (Lansford kick) WAS 24–7
  - WAS – Monk 21 pass from Theismann (Moseley kick) WAS 31–7
  - WAS – Riggins 1 run (Moseley kick) WAS 38–7
  - WAS – field goal Moseley 36 WAS 41–7
  - WAS – field goal Moseley 41 WAS 44–7
  - WAS – Green 72 interception return (Moseley kick) WAS 51–7

=== Standings ===
NFC West
	W	L	T	PCT	DIV	CONF	PF	PA	STK
^{(2)} San Francisco 49ers	10	6	0	.625	4–2	8–4	432	293	W3
^{(5)} Los Angeles Rams	9	7	0	.563	5–1	8–4	361	344	W1
New Orleans Saints	8	8	0	.500	2–4	7–5	319	337	L1
Atlanta Falcons	7	9	0	.438	1–5	4–8	370	389	W1

== Awards and honors ==
- Eric Dickerson, NFC Pro Bowl selection
- Eric Dickerson, All-Pro selection
- Eric Dickerson, NFL Offensive Rookie of the Year
- Eric Dickerson, UPI NFL-NFC Rookie of the Year
- Eric Dickerson, UPI NFC Player of the Year

== See also ==
Other Anaheim–based teams in 1983

- California Angels (Anaheim Stadium)
  - 1983 California Angels season
