= 1985 Los Angeles Rams season =

NFL team season

- Logo commemorating the Rams' 40th season in the Greater Los Angeles Area
- Owner: Georgia Frontiere
- General manager: John Shaw
- Head coach: John Robinson
- Defensive coordinator: Fritz Shurmur
- Home stadium: Anaheim Stadium

Results
- Record: 11–5
- Division place: 1st NFC West
- Playoffs: Won Divisional Playoffs (vs. Cowboys) 20–0; Lost NFC Championship (at Bears) 0–24

Uniform
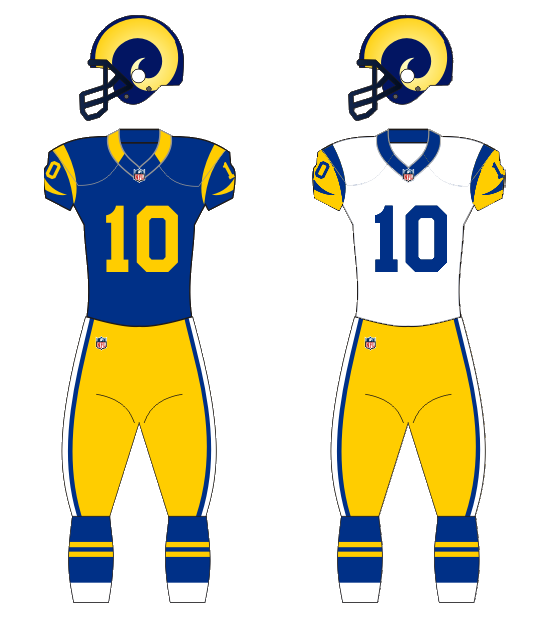

The 1985 Los Angeles Rams season was the franchise's 48th season in the National Football League and their 40th in the Greater Los Angeles Area.

In the playoffs, the Rams shut out the Dallas Cowboys 20–0 in the Divisional playoffs, advancing to the NFC Championship Game, but were shut out themselves by the eventual Super Bowl champion Chicago Bears 24–0. Eric Dickerson rushed for 1,234 yards in 1985 while missing the first two games while in a contract dispute. He missed the Pro Bowl for the first time in his short NFL career. He did, however, go on to rush for a playoff record 248 yards against the Dallas Cowboys in post-season play.

It was also the last time the Rams would win an NFC West divisional title when based in Los Angeles until 2017, and the last NFC West title until 1999 while they were in St. Louis. After the season, Russ Bolinger decided he had played his final NFL game.

== Offseason ==
=== NFL draft ===
1985 Los Angeles Rams draft
Round	Pick	Player	Position	College	Notes
1	21	Jerry Gray *	Cornerback	Texas	
2	50	Chuck Scott	Wide receiver	Vanderbilt	Made roster in 1986
3	77	Dale Hatcher *	Punter	Clemson	
5	113	Kevin Greene * ^{†}	Linebacker	Auburn	
6	161	Mike Young	Wide receiver	UCLA	
6	162	Damone Johnson	Tight end	Cal Poly	Made roster in 1986
7	189	Danny Bradley	Running back	Oklahoma	
8	218	Marlon McIntyre	Running back	Pittsburgh	
9	245	Gary Swanson	Linebacker	Cal Poly	
10	274	Duval Love *	Guard	UCLA	
11	285	Doug Flutie *	Quarterback	Boston College	Signed with New Jersey Generals (USFL)
11	301	Kevin Brown	Defensive back	Northwestern	
Made roster † Pro Football Hall of Fame * Made at least one Pro Bowl during career

=== Undrafted free agents ===
1985 undrafted free agents of note
Player	Position	College
Raymond Arnold	Wide receiver	Cal State-Hayward
Jonathan Finstuen	Wide receiver	Occidental College
Mike Shiner	Tackle	Notre Dame
Alvin Wright	Nose Tackle	Jacksonville State

== Personnel ==
=== Staff ===
1985 Los Angeles Rams staff
Front office: Owner/President – Georgia Frontiere; Administrator of Football Operations – Jack Faulkner; Director of Player Personnel – John Math; Head coaches: Head Coach – John Robinson; Offensive coaches: Running Backs – Bruce Snyder; Wide Receivers – Lew Erber; Tight Ends – Norv Turner; Offensive Line – Hudson Houck; Special Assistant – Denny Schuler	Defensive coaches: Defensive Line – Marv Goux; Assistant Defensive Line – Larry Brooks; Inside Linebackers – Fritz Shurmur; Outside Linebackers – Fred Whittingham; Defensive Backs – Steve Shafer; Special teams coaches: Special Teams – Gil Haskell

=== Roster ===
1985 Los Angeles Rams roster
Quarterbacks (QB): 5 Dieter Brock; 8 Steve Dils; 9 Jeff Kemp; Running backs (RB): 29 Eric Dickerson; 44 Mike Guman; 30 Barry Redden; 33 Charles White; Wide receivers (WR): 89 Ron Brown; 82 Bobby Duckworth; 80 Henry Ellard; 88 Mike Young; Tight ends (TE): 81 David Hill; 85 Tony Hunter	Offensive linemen (OL): 62 Bill Bain T; 73 Russ Bolinger G; 60 Dennis Harrah G; 72 Kent Hill G; 75 Irv Pankey T; 78 Jackie Slater T; 61 Tony Slaton C/G; Defensive linemen (DL): 70 Charles DeJurnett NT; 71 Reggie Doss DE; 68 Dennis Harrison DE; 77 Gary Jeter DE; 69 Greg Meisner NT; 98 Shawn Miller NT; 93 Doug Reed DE	Linebackers (LB): 50 Jim Collins ILB; 55 Carl Ekern ILB; 91 Kevin Greene OLB; 59 Mark Jerue ILB; 57 Jim Laughlin ILB; 58 Mel Owens OLB; 51 Norwood Vann OLB; 54 Mike Wilcher OLB; Defensive backs (DB): 21 Nolan Cromwell SS; 48 Tim Fox FS; 25 Jerry Gray CB; 27 Gary Green CB; 47 LeRoy Irvin CB; 20 Johnnie Johnson FS; 22 Vince Newsome SS; Special teams (ST): 90 Ed Brady LS; 3 Dale Hatcher P; 1 Mike Lansford K	Reserve: 52 George Andrews LB (IR); 34 Danny Bradley WR (IR); 26 Eric Harris CB (IR); 38 Damone Johnson TE (IR); 67 Duval Love G (IR); 83 James McDonald TE (IR); 43 Mike Pleasant CB (IR); 84 Chuck Scott WR (IR); 65 Mike Shiner T (IR); 56 Doug Smith C (IR); Rookies in italics

== Regular season ==
=== Schedule ===
Week	Date	Opponent	Result	Record	Venue	Recap
1	September 8	Denver Broncos	**W** 20–16	1–0	Anaheim Stadium	Recap
2	September 15	at Philadelphia Eagles	**W** 17–6	2–0	Veterans Stadium	Recap
3	September 23	at Seattle Seahawks	**W** 35–24	3–0	Kingdome	Recap
4	September 29	**Atlanta Falcons**	**W** 17–6	4–0	Anaheim Stadium	Recap
5	October 6	Minnesota Vikings	**W** 13–0	5–0	Anaheim Stadium	Recap
6	October 13	at Tampa Bay Buccaneers	**W** 31–27	6–0	Tampa Stadium	Recap
7	October 20	at Kansas City Chiefs	**W** 16–0	7–0	Arrowhead Stadium	Recap
8	October 27	**San Francisco 49ers**	**L** 14–28	7–1	Anaheim Stadium	Recap
9	November 3	**New Orleans Saints**	**W** 28–10	8–1	Anaheim Stadium	Recap
10	November 10	at New York Giants	**L** 19–24	8–2	Giants Stadium	Recap
11	November 17	at **Atlanta Falcons**	**L** 14–30	8–3	Atlanta–Fulton County Stadium	Recap
12	November 24	Green Bay Packers	**W** 34–17	9–3	Anaheim Stadium	Recap
13	December 1	at **New Orleans Saints**	**L** 3–29	9–4	Louisiana Superdome	Recap
14	December 9	at **San Francisco 49ers**	**W** 27–20	10–4	Candlestick Park	Recap
15	December 15	St. Louis Cardinals	**W** 46–14	11–4	Anaheim Stadium	Recap
16	December 23	Los Angeles Raiders	**L** 6–16	11–5	Anaheim Stadium	Recap
Note: Intra-division opponents are in **bold** text.

=== Game summaries ===
==== Week 1 ====
Team	1	2	3	4	Total
Broncos	0	16	0	0	16
• Rams	3	7	0	10	20

- Date: September 8
- Location: Anaheim Stadium
- Referee: Gordon McCarter

Rams overcame 2 touchdown passes by John Elway with a late comeback led by "old" rookie QB Dieter Brock, who passed for 174 yards and a touchdown in his first NFL start. Backup RB Charles White ran for the winning touchdown in place of holdout Eric Dickerson.

==== Week 2 ====
Team	1	2	3	4	Total
• Rams	10	0	0	7	17
Eagles	3	3	0	0	6

- Date: September 15
- Location: Veterans Stadium
- Referee: Jerry Markbreit
- TV announcers (CBS): Jack Buck and Hank Stram

Rams defense sacked Randall Cunningham 5 times and picked off 4 passes and White ran for 144 yards and a touchdown. Henry Ellard added an 80-yard punt return touchdown.

==== Week 3 ====
Team	1	2	3	4	Total
• Rams	7	0	14	14	35
Seahawks	0	7	3	14	24

- Date: September 23
- Location: Kingdome
- Referee: Fred Wyant
- TV announcers (ABC): Frank Gifford, Joe Namath, and O. J. Simpson

Dickerson celebrated the end of his holdout by rushing for 150 yards and 3 touchdowns in this Monday Night matchup.

==== Week 4 ====
Team	1	2	3	4	Total
Falcons	0	3	3	0	6
• Rams	0	10	7	0	17

- Date: September 29
- Location: Anaheim Stadium
- Referee: Jim Tunney
- Television network: CBS

Rams continued to dominate on defense and Brock passed for two touchdowns.

==== Week 5 ====
Team	1	2	3	4	Total
Vikings	0	0	7	3	10
• Rams	0	6	7	0	13

- Date: October 6
- Location: Anaheim Stadium
- Referee: Red Cashion
- TV announcers (CBS): Tom Brookshier and Dick Vermeil

Rams stayed unbeaten despite being outgained in yards 306–188.

==== Week 6 ====
Team	1	2	3	4	Total
• Rams	0	14	10	7	31
Buccaneers	7	13	0	7	27

- Date: October 13
- Location: Tampa Stadium
- Referee: Ben Dreith
- TV announcers (CBS): Jim Hill and John Dockery

In a nip-and-tuck game, the Rams had two interception return touchdowns in the second half, by LB Carl Ekern and the winning touchdown by CB Leroy Irvin.

==== Week 7 ====
Team	1	2	3	4	Total
• Rams	0	13	3	0	16
Chiefs	0	0	0	0	0

- Date: October 20
- Location: Arrowhead Stadium
- Referee: Dick Jorgensen

Dickerson ran for a touchdown and Mike Lansford kicked three FG's. Rams' opportunistic defense intercepted Todd Blackledge six times. Brock passed for only 68 yards.

==== Week 8 ====
Team	1	2	3	4	Total
• 49ers	14	14	0	0	28
Rams	0	0	7	7	14

- Date: October 27
- Location: Anaheim Stadium
- Game start: 1:00 PST
- Referee: Gene Barth
- TV announcers (CBS): Tom Brookshier and Dick Vermeil

Rams were knocked from the unbeaten ranks at home as their offensive failures came back to haunt them. Joe Montana passed for 3 touchdowns and led the 49ers to a 28–0 lead. Brock passed for 344 yards (most of them late) and two late touchdowns.

==== Week 9 ====
Team	1	2	3	4	Total
Saints	0	0	7	3	10
• Rams	7	7	7	7	28

- Date: November 3
- Location: Anaheim Stadium
- Referee: Tom Dooley

Rams were totally dominant at home as Brock passed for 2 touchdowns and Dickerson (108 yards rushing) and White each had a touchdown run. Rams picked off 3 passes and had nine QB sacks.

==== Week 10 ====
Team	1	2	3	4	Total
Rams	7	6	3	3	19
• Giants	0	7	10	7	24

- Date: November 10
- Location: Giants Stadium
- Referee: Jerry Markbreit

Giants fought back from a 16–7 early 2nd half deficit behind 2 touchdown runs by Joe Morris.

==== Week 11 ====
Team	1	2	3	4	Total
Rams	0	0	0	14	14
• Falcons	10	10	3	7	30

- Date: November 17
- Location: Atlanta-Fulton County Stadium
- Referee: Bob Frederic

Surprising blowout by the 1–9 Falcons behind three rushing touchdowns by Gerald Riggs and a Falcons' defense that held the Rams to only 45 yards rushing.

==== Week 12 ====
Team	1	2	3	4	Total
Packers	0	10	7	0	17
• Rams	7	7	7	13	34

- Date: November 24
- Location: Anaheim Stadium
- Referee: Pat Haggerty

Dickerson had 150 yards and a touchdown, but the real hero was Olympic sprinter-turned-WR Ron Brown. Brown returned two kickoffs for touchdowns and caught a touchdown pass.

==== Week 13 ====
Team	1	2	3	4	Total
Rams	0	3	0	0	3
• Saints	6	3	0	20	29

- Date: December 1
- Location: Louisiana Superdome
- Game weather: Indoors (dome)
- Referee: Jerry Seeman
- TV announcers (CBS): Jack Buck and Hank Stram

Saints got their revenge for the earlier blowout by sacking Brock nine times and recovering 3 fumbles. Bobby Hebert passed for a touchdown and LB Jack Del Rio returned a fumble for another. || Louisiana Superdome

==== Week 14 ====
Team	1	2	3	4	Total
• Rams	0	3	7	17	27
49ers	0	7	6	7	20

- Date: December 9
- Location: Candlestick Park, San Francisco, California
- Game attendance: 60,581
- Referee: Red Cashion
- TV announcers (ABC): Frank Gifford, Joe Namath and O. J. Simpson

Scoring summary
Q2	14:54	SF	Clark 7 yard pass from Montana (Wersching kick)	SF 7–0
Q2	8:52	LA	Lansford 25 yard field goal	SF 7–3
Q3	14:46	LA	Brown 86 yard kickoff return (Lansford kick)	LA 10–7
Q3	13:10	SF	Rice 66 yard pass from Montana (kick blocked)	SF 13–10
Q4	9:32	LA	Lansford 29 yard field goal	Tie 13–13
Q4	5:38	SF	Craig 1 yard pass from Montana (Wersching kick)	SF 20–13
Q4	5:08	LA	Ellard 39 yard pass from Brock (Lansford kick)	Tie 20–20
Q4	3:24	LA	Green 41 yard interception return (Lansford kick)	LA 27–20

In this road Monday Night matchup, the 49ers looked to be in control until Henry Ellard scored on a tipped pass and CB Gary Green returned an interception for the winning points. Montana passed for 328 yards and 3 touchdowns. The Rams clinched a playoff spot with the win.

==== Week 15 ====
Team	1	2	3	4	Total
Cardinals	7	0	7	0	14
• Rams	13	23	7	3	46

- Date: December 15
- Location: Anaheim Stadium
- Referee: Chuck Heberling
- TV announcers (CBS): Jack Buck and Hank Stram

Brock picked the right time to have his best game as a Ram as the Rams clinched their first NFC West Division crown since 1979. Brock passed for 4 touchdowns, Dickerson ran for 124 yards and two more, and the Rams rolled up 425 yards of offense.

==== Week 16 ====
Team	1	2	3	4	Total
• Raiders	0	6	0	10	16
Rams	0	3	3	0	6

- Date: December 23
- Location: Anaheim Stadium
- Referee: Ben Dreith
- TV announcers (ABC): Frank Gifford, Joe Namath, OJ Simpson

In a somewhat lackluster performance at home on Monday Night, the Rams could only muster two FG's and Brock was sacked 6 times.

=== Standings ===
NFC West
	W	L	T	PCT	DIV	CONF	PF	PA	STK
Los Angeles Rams^{(2)}	11	5	0	.688	3–3	8–4	340	277	L1
San Francisco 49ers^{(5)}	10	6	0	.625	4–2	7–5	411	263	W2
New Orleans Saints	5	11	0	.313	2–4	5–7	294	401	L3
Atlanta Falcons	4	12	0	.250	3–3	4–8	282	452	W2

== Statistics ==
=== Passing ===
Player	Games Played	Completions	Attempts	Yards	Touchdowns	Interceptions	Rating
Dieter Brock	15	218	365	2658	16	13	82.0
Jeff Kemp	5	16	38	214	0	1	49.7

=== Rushing ===
Player	Games Played	Attempts	Yards	Touchdowns	Longest run
Eric Dickerson	14	292	1234	12	43
Barry Redden	14	87	380	0	41
Charles White	16	70	310	3	32
Dieter Brock	15	20	38	0	13
Lynn Cain	7	11	46	0	9
Mike Guman	8	11	32	0	6
Jeff Kemp	5	5	0	0	3
Henry Ellard	16	3	8	0	16
Ron J. Brown	13	2	13	0	9
Steve Dils	15	2	−4	0	−2

=== Receiving ===
Player	Receptions	Yards	Touchdowns	Longest reception
Henry Ellard	54	811	5	64
Tony Hunter	50	562	4	47
David Hill	29	271	1	37
Bobby Duckworth	25	422	3	42

== Playoffs ==
Week	Date	Opponent	Result	Record	Venue	Recap
Divisional Playoff	January 4, 1986	Dallas Cowboys	W 20–0	1–0	Anaheim Stadium	Recap
NFC Championship	January 12, 1986	at Chicago Bears	L 0–24	1–1	Soldier Field	Recap

=== Divisional ===
Team	1	2	3	4	Total
Cowboys	0	0	0	0	0
• Rams	3	0	10	7	20

- Date: January 4
- Location: Anaheim Stadium
- Game start: 1:00 p.m. PST
- Game weather: Fog/drizzle; 67 °F (19 °C)
- Referee: Dick Jorgensen
- TV announcers (CBS): Jack Buck, Hank Stram, and Dick Vermeil

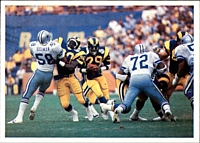
Rams' running back Dickerson (29) rushing the ball through the Cowboys' defense in the 1985 NFC Divisional Playoff Game.

Running back Eric Dickerson led the Rams to a victory by scoring two touchdowns and recording a playoff record 248 rushing yards. After the first half ended with a 3–0 Los Angeles lead, Dickerson scored on a 55-yard touchdown run early in the third period. On the ensuing kickoff, Kenny Duckett fumbled, and the ball was recovered by Vince Newsome to set up kicker Mike Lansford's second field goal. In the fourth period, Tony Hunter recovered a fumbled punt to set up Dickerson's 40-yard rushing touchdown. The Rams' defense dominated the Cowboys' offense all afternoon as the Cowboys never got inside the Rams' 20-yard-line. This was the last home playoff game for the Rams in Los Angeles until 2017. This was also the last playoff game in which Tom Landry coached.

=== Conference Championship ===
Team	1	2	3	4	Total
Rams	0	0	0	0	0
• Bears	10	0	7	7	24

- Date: January 12
- Location: Soldier Field
- Game start: 11:30 a.m. CST
- Game weather: Cloudy/snow showers; 37 °F (3 °C)
- Referee: Jim Tunney
- TV announcers (CBS): Pat Summerall and John Madden

The Bears defense dominated the game by limiting Rams running back Eric Dickerson to 46 yards rushing, and holding quarterback Dieter Brock to just 10 completions out of 31 pass attempts for 66 passing yards. Los Angeles only gained 130 yards of total offense. The Rams had a chance to get back in the game as they got inside the Bears' 15-yard line in the waning moments of the first half, but poor play calling and clock management, as well as a controversial call by the officials on the last play of the half, resulted in the clock running out. Officials' ability to review plays (via instant replay) was not made available until the following season.

== Awards and records ==
=== Milestones ===
Gary Jeter, NFL Comeback Player of Year.

== See also ==
Other Anaheim–based teams in 1985

- California Angels (Anaheim Stadium)
  - 1985 California Angels season
