= 1986 Los Angeles Rams season =

NFL team season

- Owner: Georgia Frontiere
- Head coach: John Robinson
- Defensive coordinator: Fritz Shurmur
- Home stadium: Anaheim Stadium

Results
- Record: 10–6
- Division place: 2nd NFC West
- Playoffs: Lost Wild Card Playoffs (at Redskins) 7–19

The 1986 Los Angeles Rams season was the franchise's 49th season in the National Football League, their fiftieth overall, and their 41st in the Greater Los Angeles Area. The season began with the Rams looking to improve on their 11–5 record from 1985, which ended with them getting shut out by the Chicago Bears in the NFC Championship Game, 24–0. The Rams began the season with three straight wins against the St. Louis Cardinals, San Francisco 49ers, and Indianapolis Colts. However, in week 4, the Philadelphia Eagles (0–3) upset the Rams, 34–20. The Rams would then win four of their next five, including a 20–17 win over the Bears in a rematch of the NFC Championship Game. The Rams would then close out the season with losses in four of their final seven games to end the year 10–6, good enough for second place in the NFC West behind the 49ers (10–5–1). In the playoffs, the Rams lost to the Washington Redskins, 19–7, in the NFC Wild Card Game.

== Offseason ==
=== NFL draft ===
| = Pro Bowler | = Hall of Famer |

1986 Los Angeles Rams draft
| Round | Selection | Player | Position | College |
|---|---|---|---|---|
| 1 | 23 | Mike Schad | Offensive Tackle | Queen's University |
| 2 | 50 | Tom Newberry | Guard | Wisconsin–La Crosse |
| 3 | 71 | Hugh Millen | Quarterback | Washington |
| 6 | 144 | Robert Jenkins | Tackle | UCLA |
| 6 | 160 | Lynn Williams | Running back | Kansas |
| 8 | 195 | Steve Jarecki | Linebacker | UCLA |
| 8 | 216 | Hank Goebel | Tackle | Fullerton State |
| 9 | 243 | Elbert Watts | Defensive back | USC |
| 10 | 273 | Garrett Breeland | Linebacker | USC |
| 11 | 300 | Chul Schwanke | Running back | South Dakota |
| 12 | 327 | Marcus Dupree | Running back | Oklahoma |
| undrafted | | Alvin Wright | Defensive Tackle | Jacksonville State |

Jim Everett (Quarterback, Purdue University) was selected by the Houston Oilers as the third pick in the first round, and was the first quarterback taken. Unable to work out a contract agreement with Everett, the Oilers traded his rights to the Rams. In exchange for Everett, the Rams sent the Oilers guard Kent Hill, defensive end William Fuller, their first pick and fifth pick in the 1987 NFL draft, and their first pick in the 1988 NFL draft.

== Roster ==
1986 Los Angeles Rams roster
| Quarterbacks (QB): 10 Steve Bartkowski; 8 Steve Dils; 11 Jim Everett; Running backs (RB): 29 Eric Dickerson; 30 Barry Redden; 32 Tim Tyrrell; 33 Charles White; Wide receivers (WR): 89 Ron Brown; 80 Henry Ellard; 83 Kevin House; 88 Mike Young; Tight ends (TE): 81 David Hill; 86 Damone Johnson; 45 Darren Long | Offensive linemen (OL): 60 Dennis Harrah G; 67 Duval Love T/G; 66 Tom Newberry G; 75 Irv Pankey T; 56 Doug Smith C; 78 Jackie Slater T; 61 Tony Slaton C/G; Defensive linemen (DL): 71 Reggie Doss DE; 77 Gary Jeter DE; 69 Greg Meisner NT; 98 Shawn Miller NT; 93 Doug Reed DE; 99 Alvin Wright | Linebackers (LB): 55 Carl Ekern ILB; 91 Kevin Greene OLB; 59 Mark Jerue ILB; 57 Jim Laughlin ILB; 58 Mel Owens OLB; 52 Cliff Thrift ILB; 51 Norwood Vann OLB; 54 Mike Wilcher OLB; Defensive backs (DB): 21 Nolan Cromwell SS; 48 Tim Fox SS; 25 Jerry Gray CB; 47 LeRoy Irvin CB; 20 Johnnie Johnson FS; 22 Vince Newsome FS; 49 Mickey Sutton CB; Special teams (ST): 5 Dale Hatcher P; 1 Mike Lansford K; 90 Mike McDonald LS | Reserve: 5 Dieter Brock QB (IR); 53 Steve Busick LB (IR); 50 Jim Collins LB (IR); 70 Charles DeJurnett NT (IR); 63 Hank Goebel G (IR); 64 Robert Cox T (IR); 44 Mike Guman FB (IR); 87 Tony Hunter TE (IR); 12 Hugh Millen QB (IR); 76 Mike Schad G (IR); 97 Duke Schamel LB (IR); 84 Chuck Scott WR (IR); Rookies in italics |

== Regular season ==
=== Schedule ===
| Week | Date | Opponent | Result | Record | Venue | Attendance |
|---|---|---|---|---|---|---|
| 1 | September 7 | at St. Louis Cardinals | **W** 16–10 | 1–0 | Busch Memorial Stadium | 40,347 |
| 2 | September 14 | **San Francisco 49ers** | **W** 16–13 | 2–0 | Anaheim Stadium | 65,195 |
| 3 | September 21 | at Indianapolis Colts | **W** 24–7 | 3–0 | Hoosier Dome | 59,012 |
| 4 | September 28 | at Philadelphia Eagles | **L** 20–34 | 3–1 | Veterans Stadium | 65,646 |
| 5 | October 5 | Tampa Bay Buccaneers | **W** 26–20 (OT) | 4–1 | Anaheim Stadium | 50,585 |
| 6 | October 12 | at **Atlanta Falcons** | **L** 14–26 | 4–2 | Atlanta–Fulton County Stadium | 51,662 |
| 7 | October 19 | Detroit Lions | **W** 14–10 | 5–2 | Anaheim Stadium | 50,992 |
| 8 | October 26 | **Atlanta Falcons** | **W** 14–7 | 6–2 | Anaheim Stadium | 56,993 |
| 9 | November 3 | at Chicago Bears | **W** 20–17 | 7–2 | Soldier Field | 64,877 |
| 10 | November 9 | at **New Orleans Saints** | **L** 0–6 | 7–3 | Louisiana Superdome | 62,352 |
| 11 | November 16 | New England Patriots | **L** 28–30 | 7–4 | Anaheim Stadium | 64,339 |
| 12 | November 23 | **New Orleans Saints** | **W** 26–13 | 8–4 | Anaheim Stadium | 58,600 |
| 13 | November 30 | at New York Jets | **W** 17–3 | 9–4 | Giants Stadium | 70,539 |
| 14 | December 7 | Dallas Cowboys | **W** 29–10 | 10–4 | Anaheim Stadium | 64,949 |
| 15 | December 14 | Miami Dolphins | **L** 31–37 (OT) | 10–5 | Anaheim Stadium | 62,629 |
| 16 | December 19 | at **San Francisco 49ers** | **L** 14–24 | 10–6 | Candlestick Park | 60,366 |
Note: Intra-division opponents are in **bold** text.

=== Standings ===
NFC West
| | W | L | T | PCT | DIV | CONF | PF | PA | STK |
|---|---|---|---|---|---|---|---|---|---|
| ^{(3)} San Francisco 49ers | 10 | 5 | 1 | .656 | 3–2–1 | 6–5–1 | 374 | 247 | W3 |
| ^{(5)} Los Angeles Rams | 10 | 6 | 0 | .625 | 3–3 | 8–4 | 309 | 267 | L2 |
| Atlanta Falcons | 7 | 8 | 1 | .469 | 2–3–1 | 6–5–1 | 280 | 280 | W1 |
| New Orleans Saints | 7 | 9 | 0 | .438 | 3–3 | 6–6 | 288 | 287 | L1 |

== Playoffs ==
| Round | Date | Opponent (seed) | Result | Record | Venue | Attendance |
|---|---|---|---|---|---|---|
| Wildcard | December 28 | at Washington Redskins (4) | L 7–19 | 0–1 | RFK Stadium | 54,180 |

== Awards and records ==
- Eric Dickerson, NFC Pro Bowl selection
- Eric Dickerson, All-Pro selection
- Eric Dickerson, NFL Offensive Player of the Year
- Eric Dickerson, UPI NFC Player of the Year
- Carl Ekern, NFC Pro Bowl selection
- Jerry Gray, NFC Pro Bowl selection
- Dennis Harrah, NFC Pro Bowl selection
- LeRoy Irvin, NFC Pro Bowl selection
- Jackie Slater, NFC Pro Bowl selection
- Doug Smith, NFC Pro Bowl selection

== Let's Ram It ==
The team recorded a promotional video, Let's Ram It performed by the Los Angeles Rams football team (credited as the "The Rammers"). It stars multiple players with solo verses:

- Verse 1: Jackie Slater, Nolan Cromwell, Gary Jeter, Norwood Vann, Dennis Harrah
- Verse 2: David Hill, Jim Collins, Ron Brown, Tony Hunter
- Verse 3: Barry Redden, Carl Ekern, Johnnie Johnson, LeRoy Irvin, Eric Dickerson

Dance segments of the video show the above players, plus Tom Newberry. The song features a number of double entendre lyrics.

== See also ==
Other Anaheim–based teams in 1986

- California Angels (Anaheim Stadium)
  - 1986 California Angels season
