= Norwood Vann =

American football player (born 1962)

No. 51, 50
- Position: Linebacker

Personal information
- Born: February 18, 1962 (age 64); Philadelphia, Pennsylvania, U.S.
- Listed height: 6 ft 1 in (1.85 m)
- Listed weight: 228 lb (103 kg)

Career information
- College: East Carolina
- NFL draft: 1984: 10th round, 253rd overall pick

Career history
- Los Angeles Rams (1984–1987); Los Angeles Raiders (1988); Buffalo Bills (1989)*
- * Offseason or practice squad member only

Career NFL statistics
- Fumble recoveries: 7
- Safeties: 1
- Stats at Pro Football Reference

Norwood Vann (born February 18, 1962) is an American former professional football player who played five seasons with the Los Angeles Rams and Los Angeles Raiders of the National Football League (NFL) in the early 1980s. He played college football for the East Carolina Pirates.

== College career ==
A member of the famed 1983 East Carolina Pirates, in his senior year, Vann started at tight end and earned the team's "Clutch Player Award".

- Second-team All-South Independent (1983)

== Professional career ==
Drafted by the Rams in the 10th round with the 253rd pick of the 1984 NFL draft. Vann played five NFL seasons as a backup and special teams linebacker, tying for the league lead in safeties in his 1984 rookie year with one. Vann recovered seven fumbles over his four years with the Rams and then became a Los Angeles Raider in 1988. He played one game for the Raiders and later was involved in the Buffalo Bills organization but did not play for the Bills.

== "Let's Ram It" ==
During his professional career, Vann made an energetic appearance in the 1986 Rams' promotional video, "Let's Ram It" by The Rammers, in which he is one of the first five featured soloists, along with Jackie Slater, Nolan Cromwell, Gary Jeter, and Dennis Harrah. Following Jeter's segment, Vann's verse went: "This is limousine Woody, my moves are like dreams, they call me the demon on the special teams. I know how to rock from the toes to the head, when I pull the trigger, I'll knock you dead", leading into Dennis Harrah's "Mountain Man"-themed verse.

Vann, possibly due to his athletic dance moves, was also featured prominently as one of the five players in the front line during the song's chorus segments, alongside NFL Hall of Famer Eric Dickerson, four-time Pro Bowler Nolan Cromwell, and two-time Pro Bowlers David "Big Daddy" Hill and LeRoy Irvin, all players with considerably longer and more successful NFL careers than Vann.

== Post-NFL ==
Following his release from the Bills organization, Vann played in the CFL for the Toronto Argonauts for several seasons, before retiring and returning to East Carolina to complete his undergraduate degree in communications in 1995.

In 1999, following the completion of his playing career, college teammate Reggie Branch compared some of his Washington Redskins Super Bowl-winning teammates to those at East Carolina, mentioning Vann specifically by name.

In 1999, Vann was also inducted into the East Carolina Pirates hall of fame.

He now resides in Virginia and works for the South Boston Dollar General Distribution Plant as shipping supervisor.
