= 1986 Pro Bowl =

National Football League all-star game

1986 NFL Pro Bowl
NFC	AFC
28	24
Head coach: John Robinson (Los Angeles Rams)	Head coach: Don Shula (Miami Dolphins)
	1	2	3	4	Total
NFC	0	7	7	14	28
AFC	7	17	0	0	24
- Date: February 2, 1986
- Stadium: Aloha Stadium; Honolulu, Hawaii
- MVP: Phil Simms (New York Giants)
- Referee: Bob McElwee
- Attendance: 50,101

TV in the United States
- Network: ABC
- Announcers: Frank Gifford, O. J. Simpson, Joe Namath & Tim Brant

The 1986 Pro Bowl was the NFL's 36th annual all-star game which featured the outstanding performers from the 1985 season. The game was played on Sunday, February 2, 1986, at Aloha Stadium in Honolulu, Hawaii before a crowd of 50,101. The final score was NFC 28, AFC 24.

Don Shula of the Miami Dolphins led the AFC team against an NFC team coached by Los Angeles Rams head coach John Robinson. The referee was Bob McElwee.

Phil Simms of the New York Giants was named the game's MVP. Players on the winning NFC team received $10,000 apiece while the AFC participants each took home $5,000.

== AFC roster ==
The players representing the AFC were:

=== Offense ===
Position	Starter(s)	Reserve(s)
Quarterback	13 Dan Marino, Miami	7 Ken O'Brien, N. Y. Jets; 14 Dan Fouts, San Diego
Running back	32 Marcus Allen, L. A. Raiders	34 Kevin Mack, Cleveland; 24 Freeman McNeil, N. Y. Jets
Fullback	32 Craig James, New England	
Wide receiver	83 Louis Lipps, Pittsburgh; 80 Steve Largent, Seattle	83 Mark Clayton, Miami; 89 Wes Chandler, San Diego
Tight end	82 Ozzie Newsome, Cleveland	46 Todd Christensen, L. A. Raiders
Offensive tackle	78 Anthony Muñoz, Cincinnati; 75 Chris Hinton, Indianapolis	76 Brian Holloway, New England
Offensive guard	73 John Hannah, New England; 61 Roy Foster, Miami	63 Mike Munchak, Houston
Center	57 Dwight Stephenson, Miami	52 Mike Webster, Pittsburgh

=== Defense ===
Position	Starter(s)	Reserve(s)
Defensive end	74 Howie Long, L. A. Raiders; 99 Mark Gastineau, N. Y. Jets	75 Rulon Jones, Denver
Defensive tackle	73 Joe Klecko, New York Jets	79 Bob Golic, Cleveland
Outside linebacker	56 Andre Tippett, New England; 56 Chip Banks, Cleveland	57 Clay Matthews, Cleveland; 59 Mike Merriweather, Pittsburgh
Inside linebacker	77 Karl Mecklenburg, Denver; 56 Lance Mehl, N. Y. Jets	57 Steve Nelson, New England; 50 Fredd Young, Seattle Seahawks
Cornerback	22 Mike Haynes, L. A. Raiders; 26 Raymond Clayborn, New England	20 Louis Wright, Denver
Free safety	20 Deron Cherry, Kansas City	31 Fred Marion, New England
Strong safety	45 Kenny Easley, Seattle	49 Dennis Smith, Denver

=== Special teams ===
Position	Starter(s)	Reserve(s)
Punter	3 Rohn Stark, Indianapolis	
Placekicker	1 Gary Anderson, Pittsburgh	
Kick returner	80 Irving Fryar, New England	

== NFC roster ==
The players representing the NFC were:

=== Offense ===
Position	Starter(s)	Reserve(s)
Quarterback	16 Joe Montana, San Francisco	11 Phil Simms, N. Y. Giants; 9 Jim McMahon, Chicago
Running back	34 Walter Payton, Chicago	20 Joe Morris, N. Y. Giants; 42 Gerald Riggs, Atlanta
Fullback	33 Roger Craig, San Francisco	
Wide receiver	82 Mike Quick, Philadelphia; 81 Art Monk, Washington	80 James Lofton, Green Bay; 80 Tony Hill, Dallas
Tight end	84 Doug Cosbie, Dallas	88 Jimmie Giles, Tampa Bay
Offensive tackle	74 Jimbo Covert, Chicago; 78 Jackie Slater, Los Angeles Rams	66 Joe Jacoby, Washington
Offensive guard	68 Russ Grimm, Washington; 60 Dennis Harrah, Los Angeles Rams	72 Kent Hill, Los Angeles Rams
Center	63 Jay Hilgenberg, Chicago	56 Fred Quillan, San Francisco; 56 Doug Smith, Los Angeles Rams

=== Defense ===
Position	Starter(s)	Reserve(s)
Defensive end	95 Richard Dent, Chicago; 70 Leonard Marshall, N. Y. Giants	99 Dan Hampton, Chicago
Defensive tackle	54 Randy White, Dallas	95 Michael Carter, San Francisco
Outside linebacker	56 Lawrence Taylor, N. Y. Giants; 55 Otis Wilson, Chicago	57 Rickey Jackson, New Orleans
Inside linebacker	50 Mike Singletary, Chicago; 54 E. J. Junior, St. Louis	53 Harry Carson, N. Y. Giants; 50 Jim Collins, L. A. Rams
Cornerback	21 Eric Wright, San Francisco; 24 Everson Walls, Dallas	47 LeRoy Irvin, L. A. Rams; 27 Gary Green, L. A. Rams
Free safety	48 Wes Hopkins, Philadelphia	
Strong safety	22 Dave Duerson, Chicago	47 Joey Browner, Minnesota; 27 Carlton Williamson, San Francisco

=== Special teams ===
Position	Starter(s)	Reserve(s)
Punter	3 Dale Hatcher, L. A. Rams	
Placekicker	7 Morten Andersen, New Orleans	
Kick returner	89 Ron Brown, L. A. Rams	
