= 1987 Pro Bowl =

National Football League all-star game

1987 NFL Pro Bowl
AFC	NFC
10	6
Head coach: Marty Schottenheimer (Cleveland Browns)	Head coach: Joe Gibbs (Washington Redskins)
	1	2	3	4	Total
AFC	7	3	0	0	10
NFC	0	0	3	3	6
- Date: February 1, 1987
- Stadium: Aloha Stadium; Honolulu, Hawaii
- MVP: Reggie White (Philadelphia Eagles)
- Referee: Dick Jorgensen
- Attendance: 50,101

TV in the United States
- Network: ABC
- Announcers: Al Michaels, Frank Gifford & Lynn Swann

The 1987 Pro Bowl was the NFL's 37th annual all-star game which featured the outstanding performers from the 1986 season. The game was played on Sunday, February 1, 1987, at Aloha Stadium in Honolulu, Hawaii before a crowd of 50,101. The final score was AFC 10, NFC 6.

Marty Schottenheimer of the Cleveland Browns led the AFC team against an NFC team coached by Washington Redskins head coach Joe Gibbs. The referee was Dick Jorgensen.

Reggie White of the Philadelphia Eagles was named the game's MVP. Players on the winning AFC team received $10,000 apiece while the NFC participants each took home $5,000.

== AFC roster ==
The players representing the AFC were:

=== Offense ===
Position	Starter(s)	Reserve(s)
Quarterback	13 Dan Marino, Miami	7 John Elway, Denver; 7 Boomer Esiason, Cincinnati
Running back	21 James Brooks, Cincinnati	23 Sammy Winder, Denver; 28 Curt Warner, Seattle
Fullback	43 Earnest Jackson, Pittsburgh; 30 Mosi Tatupu, New England	
Wide receiver	88 Al Toon, N.Y. Jets; 80 Steve Largent, Seattle	83 Mark Clayton, Miami; 86 Stanley Morgan, New England
Tight end	46 Todd Christensen, L.A. Raiders	82 Mickey Shuler, N.Y. Jets
Offensive tackle	78 Anthony Muñoz, Cincinnati; 63 Cody Risien, Cleveland	75 Chris Hinton, Indianapolis
Offensive guard	54 Keith Bishop, Denver; 65 Max Montoya, Cincinnati	61 Roy Foster, Miami
Center	53 Ray Donaldson, Indianapolis	72 Don Mosebar, L.A. Raiders

=== Defense ===
Position	Starter(s)	Reserve(s)
Defensive end	74 Howie Long, L. A. Raiders; 75 Rulon Jones, Denver	79 Jacob Green, Seattle
Defensive tackle	63 Bill Maas, Kansas City	79 Bob Golic, Cleveland
Outside linebacker	56 Andre Tippett, New England; 56 Chip Banks, Cleveland	59 Mike Merriweather, Pittsburgh
Inside linebacker	77 Karl Mecklenburg, Denver; 56 John Offerdahl, Miami	50 Fredd Young, Seattle Seahawks
Cornerback	22 Mike Haynes, L. A. Raiders; 29 Hanford Dixon, Cleveland	26 Raymond Clayborn, New England; 31 Frank Minnifield, Cleveland
Free safety	20 Deron Cherry, Kansas City	
Strong safety	49 Dennis Smith, Denver	34 Lloyd Burruss, Kansas City

=== Special teams ===
Position	Starter(s)	Reserve(s)
Punter	3 Rohn Stark, Indianapolis	
Placekicker	1 Tony Franklin, New England	
Kick returner	80 Bobby Joe Edmonds, Seattle; 40 Gary Anderson, San Diego	

== NFC roster ==
The players representing the NFC were:

=== Offense ===
Position	Starter(s)	Reserve(s)
Quarterback	9 Tommy Kramer, Minnesota	10 Jay Schroeder, Washington
Running back	29 Eric Dickerson, Los Angeles Rams	20 Joe Morris, N. Y. Giants; 36 Reuben Mayes, New Orleans; 42 Gerald Riggs, Atlanta; 34 Walter Payton, Chicago
Fullback	24 Ron Wolfley, St. Louis	
Wide receiver	80 Jerry Rice, San Francisco; 84 Gary Clark, Washington	81 Art Monk, Washington; 82 Mike Quick, Philadelphia
Tight end	89 Mark Bavaro, N.Y. Giants	83 Steve Jordan, Minnesota
Offensive tackle	74 Jim Covert, Chicago; 78 Jackie Slater, Los Angeles Rams	60 Brad Benson, N. Y. Giants; 66 Joe Jacoby, Washington
Offensive guard	79 Bill Fralic, Atlanta; 60 Dennis Harrah, Los Angeles Rams	68 Russ Grimm, Washington
Center	63 Jay Hilgenberg, Chicago	56 Doug Smith, Los Angeles Rams

=== Defense ===
Position	Starter(s)	Reserve(s)
Defensive end	92 Reggie White, Philadelphia; 72 Dexter Manley, Washington	70 Leonard Marshall, N. Y. Giants
Defensive tackle	76 Steve McMichael, Chicago	64 Jim Burt, N. Y. Giants
Outside linebacker	56 Lawrence Taylor, N. Y. Giants; 58 Wilber Marshall, Chicago	57 Rickey Jackson, New Orleans
Inside linebacker	50 Mike Singletary, Chicago; 53 Harry Carson, N. Y. Giants	55 Carl Ekern, L. A. Rams; 51 Sam Mills, New Orleans
Cornerback	28 Darrell Green, Washington; 47 LeRoy Irvin, L. A. Rams	25 Jerry Gray, L. A. Rams
Free safety	42 Ronnie Lott, San Francisco	
Strong safety	22 Dave Duerson, Chicago	47 Joey Browner, Minnesota

=== Special teams ===
Position	Starter(s)	Reserve(s)
Punter	5 Sean Landeta, N. Y. Giants	
Placekicker	7 Morten Andersen, New Orleans Saints	
Kick returner	36 Vai Sikahema, St. Louis	
