= Eric Williams (linebacker) =

American football player (born 1955)

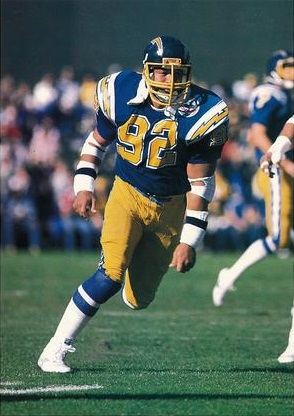
- Williams with the San Diego Chargers in 1984

No. 55, 66, 92
- Position: Linebacker

Personal information
- Born: June 17, 1955 (age 71); Los Angeles, California, U.S.
- Listed height: 6 ft 2 in (1.88 m)
- Listed weight: 227 lb (103 kg)

Career information
- High school: Central (MO)
- College: USC
- NFL draft: 1977: 8th round, 216th overall pick

Career history
- St. Louis Cardinals (1977–1981); Los Angeles Rams (1982–1983); San Diego Chargers (1984)

Career NFL statistics
- Sacks: 5.5
- Fumble recoveries: 7
- Interceptions: 5
- Stats at Pro Football Reference

Eric D. Williams (born May 17, 1955) is an American former professional football player who was a linebacker for nine seasons in the National Football League (NFL). He played college football for the USC Trojans. He was selected by the St. Louis Cardinals in the eighth round of the 1977 NFL draft.

== Early life ==
Williams grew up in Kansas City, Missouri and was a star linebacker at Central High School. He earned All-City honors as a fullback and linebacker and was one of the first Central graduates to earn an athletic scholarship after he signed with USC.

== College career ==
Williams played under renowned coach John Robinson at USC and played a key role in the Trojans' 11–1 season in 1976. He led the team in tackles (126) that season and made a key stop against Michigan in USC's Rose Bowl victory. Williams had another strong season in 1977 and was team captain and MVP of the defense.

== Professional career ==
Williams was selected in the eighth round of the 1977 NFL draft by the St. Louis Cardinals where he played five seasons. In 70 games, Williams intercepted five passes, recovered five fumbles, and recorded 5.5 sacks.

Williams reunited with John Robinson when he joined the Los Angeles Rams in 1982 and 1983 and played his final NFL season with the San Diego Chargers in 1984. Williams played for the Arizona Outlaws of the United States Football League in 1985 before hanging up the cleats.

== Personal life ==
After retiring from football, Williams spent 30 years with the United Parcel Service and still resides in the St. Louis area. He was inducted into the Missouri Sports Hall of Fame in 2016.
