= David Hill (tight end) =

American football player (born 1954)

No. 81
- Position: Tight end

Personal information
- Born: January 1, 1954 (age 72); San Antonio, Texas, U.S.
- Listed height: 6 ft 2 in (1.88 m)
- Listed weight: 229 lb (104 kg)

Career information
- High school: Highlands (San Antonio, Texas)
- College: Texas A&I
- NFL draft: 1976: 2nd round, 46th overall pick

Career history
- Detroit Lions (1976–1982); Los Angeles Rams (1983–1987)

Awards and highlights
- 2× Pro Bowl (1978, 1979); PFWA All-Rookie Team (1976)

Career NFL statistics
- Receptions: 358
- Receiving yards: 4,212
- Receiving TDs: 28
- Stats at Pro Football Reference

David Earl Hill (born January 1, 1954) is an American former professional football player who was a tight end in the National Football League (NFL). He played for twelve seasons for the Detroit Lions and the Los Angeles Rams. He was selected to two Pro Bowls while playing for the Lions. He is the younger brother of former Green Bay Packers defensive back and longtime KCBS-TV sports anchor Jim Hill. He appears in the music video for the Dire Straits song, "Walk of Life", doing an end zone celebration while a member of the Detroit Lions.

Hill also appeared in the 1986 Rams promotional video, Let's Ram It, where he went by the name "Big Daddy Hill" and states that he likes to block, but doesn't want Eric Dickerson running over him.

== NFL career statistics ==
Legend
| **Bold** | Career high |

=== Regular season ===
| Year | Team | Games | | Receiving | | | | |
| Year | Team | GP | GS | Rec | Yds | Avg | Lng | TD |
|---|---|---|---|---|---|---|---|---|
| 1976 | DET | 14 | 1 | 19 | 249 | 13.1 | 24 | **5** |
| 1977 | DET | 14 | 11 | 32 | 465 | **14.5** | **61** | 2 |
| 1978 | DET | **16** | **16** | **53** | **633** | 11.9 | 32 | 4 |
| 1979 | DET | **16** | 15 | 47 | 569 | 12.1 | 40 | 3 |
| 1980 | DET | **16** | **16** | 39 | 424 | 10.9 | 29 | 1 |
| 1981 | DET | 15 | 15 | 33 | 462 | 14.0 | 34 | 4 |
| 1982 | DET | 9 | 8 | 22 | 252 | 11.5 | 27 | 4 |
| 1983 | RAM | **16** | 3 | 28 | 280 | 10.0 | 34 | 2 |
| 1984 | RAM | **16** | **16** | 31 | 300 | 9.7 | 26 | 1 |
| 1985 | RAM | **16** | **16** | 29 | 271 | 9.3 | 37 | 1 |
| 1986 | RAM | **16** | 15 | 14 | 202 | 14.4 | 33 | 1 |
| 1987 | RAM | 12 | 12 | 11 | 105 | 9.5 | 24 | 0 |
| | | 176 | 144 | 358 | 4,212 | 11.8 | 61 | 28 |

=== Playoffs ===
| Year | Team | Games | | Receiving | | | | |
| Year | Team | GP | GS | Rec | Yds | Avg | Lng | TD |
|---|---|---|---|---|---|---|---|---|
| 1982 | DET | 1 | 1 | **3** | **29** | **9.7** | 15 | **1** |
| 1983 | RAM | **2** | 1 | **3** | 25 | 8.3 | **18** | **1** |
| 1984 | RAM | 1 | 1 | 1 | 6 | 6.0 | 6 | 0 |
| 1985 | RAM | **2** | **2** | 1 | 3 | 3.0 | 3 | 0 |
| 1986 | RAM | 1 | 1 | **3** | 27 | 9.0 | 13 | 0 |
| | | 7 | 6 | 11 | 90 | 8.2 | 18 | 2 |
