= John Robinson (American football) =

American football player and coach (1935–2024)

Personal information
- Born: July 25, 1935; Chicago, Illinois, U.S.
- Died: November 11, 2024 (aged 89); Baton Rouge, Louisiana, U.S.

Career information
- High school: Junípero Serra (San Mateo, California)
- College: Oregon

Career history

Coaching
- Oregon (1960–1971) Assistant coach; USC (1972–1974) Offensive coordinator; Oakland Raiders (1975) Running backs coach; USC (1976–1982) Head coach; Los Angeles Rams (1983–1991) Head coach; USC (1993–1997) Head coach; UNLV (1999–2004) Head coach; San Marcos HS (CA) (2010) Defensive coordinator

Operations
- UNLV (2002–2003) Athletic director; LSU (2019–2021) Senior consultant

Awards and highlights
- As head coach: National champion (1978); 5× Pac-8/Pac-10 (1976, 1978–1979, 1993, 1995); 4× Rose Bowl champion (1976, 1978, 1979, 1995); MW co-Coach of the Year (2000); Rose Bowl Hall of Fame (2003); As assistant coach: 3× National champion (1972, 1974, 2019); 2× Rose Bowl champion (1972, 1974)

Head coaching record
- Regular season: 75–68 (.524) (NFL); 132–77–4 (.629) (college)
- Postseason: 4–6 (.400)
- Career: 79–74 (.516) (NFL); 140–78–4 (.640) (college)
- Coaching profile at Pro Football Reference
- College Football Hall of Fame

John Alexander Robinson (July 25, 1935 – November 11, 2024) was an American football coach best known for his two stints as head coach of the USC Trojans and for his tenure as the head coach for the Los Angeles Rams of the National Football League (NFL) from 1983 to 1991. Robinson's USC teams won four Rose Bowls and captured a share of the national championship in the 1978 season. Robinson is one of the few college football head coaches to have non-consecutive tenure at the same school. In 2009, he was elected to the College Football Hall of Fame.

== Early life ==
Robinson was born in Chicago on July 25, 1935. He moved to Provo, Utah and then to Daly City, California where he attended Catholic school with future Pro Football Hall of Famer John Madden, at Our Lady of Perpetual Help, graduating in 1950, and Junípero Serra High School graduating in 1954.

== College career ==
Robinson attended the University of Oregon, where he played tight end on Oregon's 1958 Rose Bowl team.

== Coaching career ==
=== Oregon ===
Robinson began his coaching career at the University of Oregon, his alma mater, where he served as an assistant coach under Len Casanova and Jerry Frei from 1960 to 1971.

=== USC ===
Robinson then served as USC's offensive coordinator from 1972 to 1974 under head coach John McKay, who had been an assistant coach at Oregon when Robinson played there. During this three-year stretch, the Trojans went 31–3–2, winning three Pac-8 Conference titles and appearing in three Rose Bowls (winning two of them) with a pair of national championships.

=== Oakland Raiders ===
Robinson left USC to serve as the Oakland Raiders' running backs coach in 1975, reuniting with Madden. That season, the Raiders went 11–3 and reached the AFC Championship Game, where they lost 16–10 to the Pittsburgh Steelers.

=== USC ===
In 1976, when John McKay left USC to coach the Tampa Bay Buccaneers, Robinson was named to succeed him. Robinson would coach at USC from 1976 to 1982, during which he led the Trojans to three conference titles and five bowl games. He won the Rose Bowl in the 1976, 1978, and 1979 seasons, finishing #2 in the AP Poll all three years; USC also earned a Coaches' Poll national championship in 1978. Following the 1982 season, Robinson stepped down as head coach with a record of 67–14–2 over seven seasons.

=== Los Angeles Rams ===
Hired to replace Ray Malavasi prior to the 1983 NFL season, Robinson is considered one of the more successful coaches in Rams history, leading the franchise to the playoffs in six of his first seven seasons and twice reaching the NFC Championship Game. Both of those contests ended in defeat against eventual Super Bowl champions, the 1985 Chicago Bears and the 1989 San Francisco 49ers. Robinson's tenure as Rams coach was made more difficult by the fact that the Rams played in the same division as the 49ers, the dominant team of the 1980s (the only time he won the NFC West title during his tenure was 1985). However, he had great success in importing his trademark running game after using the No. 2 overall pick in the 1983 NFL draft to draft running back Eric Dickerson. In just over four seasons with the Rams, Dickerson ran for 7,245 yards and led the league in rushing three times, with his 1984 total of 2,105 yards still an NFL record going into 2026. After Dickerson was traded midway through the 1987 season, Robinson's Rams still had the league's rushing leader in Charles White, while Greg Bell continued Robinson's running tradition with back-to-back 1,000-yard seasons in 1988 and 1989. Additionally, Robinson introduced to the league a group of highly respected assistant coaches, including Norv Turner, Hudson Houck, and Gil Haskell, all of whom would go on to have long and productive NFL coaching careers.

Following the Rams' 30–3 loss in the 1989 NFC Championship Game, the Rams franchise went into decline. After a 5–11 season in 1990 and a 3–13 mark in 1991, Robinson was fired by the Rams, though his 79 career victories remained the most in franchise history until Sean McVay surpassed him in 2024.

=== USC ===
After spending several seasons in radio and television broadcasting, Robinson returned to the sidelines in 1993 with USC. In his second stint with the Trojans, the team won three straight bowl games, including the 1996 Rose Bowl. Though Robinson never finished with a losing season at USC, his mark of 37–21–2 (including a 3–6–1 mark against traditional rivals Notre Dame and UCLA in his second stint) led to tension by the 1997 season; in 1996 and 1997, he won just twelve of 23 games combined.

Robinson was at odds with athletic director Mike Garrett. On December 17, 1997, through an answering machine, he was informed that he was fired; and he was replaced by Paul Hackett.

=== UNLV ===
Two years later, Robinson was hired to coach football at the University of Nevada, Las Vegas. Robinson won his first two games in 1999, the second win was against Baylor where the Rebels won despite entering the game's final play down by three points and not possessing the ball; the Rebels finished 3–8 in Robinson's first year. The Rebels rebounded to win eight games in 2000, including a 31–14 victory over Arkansas in the Las Vegas Bowl, Robinson's only bowl appearance with the Rebels. In 2002, Robinson was chosen as the university's athletic director, but he stepped down from that position a year later to concentrate on the coaching. In 2003, he was inducted into the Rose Bowl Hall of Fame. Despite being relieved of duty as athletic director, he resigned after going 2–9 in his final season in 2004.

=== San Marcos High School ===
In 2010, Robinson returned to coaching as a defensive coordinator at San Marcos High School in San Marcos, California, having never before coached at the high school level. With Robinson's assistance, the Knights went 4–7 and reached the CIF-San Diego Section football playoffs.

In July 2019, Robinson joined the LSU football program as a senior consultant to head coach Ed Orgeron. He remained in that position through the 2021 season.

== Outside of coaching ==
Robinson began a three-decade long association with Sports USA Radio Network in 1998 and as of January 2018 served as a color analyst for the network. He was a board member for the Lott IMPACT Trophy, which is named after Pro Football Hall of Fame defensive back Ronnie Lott and is awarded annually to college football's Defensive IMPACT Player of the Year.

== Personal life and death ==
His son, David Robinson, is a defensive coordinator for the Fullerton College Hornets football program. He had played on Fullerton's 1983 national title team. David worked for his father as an assistant coach, working in six bowl games, most notably the 1995 Cotton Bowl and 1996 Rose Bowl.

Robinson later resided in Encinitas, California. He died from complications of pneumonia in Baton Rouge, Louisiana, on November 11, 2024, at the age of 89.

== Head coaching record ==
=== College ===
Year	Team	Overall	Conference	Standing	Bowl/playoffs	Coaches^{#}	AP^{°}
USC Trojans (Pacific-8/Pacific-10 Conference) (1976–1982)
1976	USC	11–1	7–0	1st	W Rose	2	2
1977	USC	8–4	5–2	T–2nd	W Astro-Bluebonnet	12	13
1978	USC	12–1	6–1	1st	W Rose	1	2
1979	USC	11–0–1	6–0–1	1st	W Rose	2	2
1980	USC	8–2–1	4–2–1	3rd		12	11
1981	USC	9–3	5–2	T–2nd	L Fiesta	13	14
1982	USC	8–3	5–2	T–3rd			15
USC Trojans (Pacific-10 Conference) (1993–1997)
1993	USC	8–5	6–2	T–1st	W Freedom	25	
1994	USC	8–3–1	6–2	T–2nd	W Cotton^{†}	15	13
1995	USC	9–2–1	6–1–1	T–1st	W Rose	11	12
1996	USC	6–6	3–5	T–5th			
1997	USC	6–5	4–4	T–5th			
USC:		104–35–4	63–23–3				
UNLV Rebels (Mountain West Conference) (1999–2004)
1999	UNLV	3–8	1–6	8th			
2000	UNLV	8–5	4–3	3rd	W Las Vegas		
2001	UNLV	4–7	3–4	T–5th			
2002	UNLV	5–7	3–4	T–5th			
2003	UNLV	6–6	2–5	T–7th			
2004	UNLV	2–9	1–6	8th			
UNLV:		28–42	14–28				
Total:		132–77–4					
National championship Conference title Conference division title or championship game berth
^{†}Indicates Bowl Coalition bowl.; ^{#}Rankings from final Coaches Poll.; ^{°}Rankings from final AP Poll.

=== NFL ===
Team	Year	Regular season					Postseason			
Team	Year	Won	Lost	Ties	Win %	Finish	Won	Lost	Win %	Result
LA	1983	9	7	0	.563	2nd in NFC West	1	1	.500	Lost to Washington Redskins in Divisional Game.
LA	1984	10	6	0	.625	2nd in NFC West	0	1	.000	Lost to New York Giants in Wild Card Game.
LA	1985	11	5	0	.688	1st in NFC West	1	1	.500	Lost to Chicago Bears in NFC Championship.
LA	1986	10	6	0	.625	2nd in NFC West	0	1	.000	Lost to Washington Redskins in Wild Card Game.
LA	1987	6	9	0	.400	3rd in NFC West	–	–	–	–
LA	1988	10	6	0	.625	2nd in NFC West	0	1	.000	Lost to Minnesota Vikings in Wild Card Game.
LA	1989	11	5	0	.688	2nd in NFC West	2	1	.667	Lost to San Francisco 49ers in NFC Championship.
LA	1990	5	11	0	.313	3rd in NFC West	–	–	–	–
LA	1991	3	13	0	.188	4th in NFC West	–	–	–	–
LA total		75	68	0	.524		4	6	.400	
Total		75	68	0	.524		4	6	.400	

== See also ==
- Legends Poll
