= Mike McDonald (American football) =

American football player (born 1958)

No. 63, 90, 97
- Positions: Linebacker, long snapper

Personal information
- Born: June 22, 1958 (age 68); North Hollywood, California, U.S.
- Listed height: 6 ft 1 in (1.85 m)
- Listed weight: 238 lb (108 kg)

Career information
- High school: John Burroughs (Burbank, California)
- College: USC
- NFL draft: 1983: undrafted

Career history
- Los Angeles Rams (1983–1991); Green Bay Packers (1992)*; Detroit Lions (1992)
- * Offseason or practice squad member only

Career NFL statistics
- Return yards: 134
- Stats at Pro Football Reference

Mike McDonald (born June 22, 1958) is an American former professional football player who was a long snapper for nine seasons in the National Football League (NFL). He played college football for the USC Trojans.

He was first added to the roster of the Los Angeles Rams in late 1983, over three years after he had graduated from the University of Southern California, to fill in for the injured Doug Barnett.
