= Tony Hunter (tight end) =

American football player (1960–2024)

No. 47, 87
- Position: Tight end

Personal information
- Born: May 22, 1960; Cincinnati, Ohio, U.S.
- Died: June 11, 2024 (aged 64)
- Listed height: 6 ft 4 in (1.93 m)
- Listed weight: 237 lb (108 kg)

Career information
- High school: Archbishop Moeller (Cincinnati)
- College: Notre Dame
- NFL draft: 1983: 1st round, 12th overall pick

Career history
- Buffalo Bills (1983–1984); Los Angeles Rams (1985–1986); San Diego Chargers (1989)*
- * Offseason or practice squad member only

Awards and highlights
- PFWA All-Rookie Team (1983); First-team All-American (1982)

Career NFL statistics
- Receptions: 134
- Receiving yards: 1,501
- Touchdowns: 9
- Stats at Pro Football Reference

Tony Wayne Hunter (May 22, 1960 – June 11, 2024) was an American professional football player who was a tight end in the National Football League (NFL).

Born and raised in Cincinnati, Ohio, Hunter played scholastically for Ohio powerhouse Archbishop Moeller High School. He played collegiately for the Notre Dame Fighting Irish, where, as a senior, he was honored by the Newspaper Enterprise Association as a first-team All-American.

Hunter was selected by the Buffalo Bills in the first-round (12th overall) of the 1983 NFL draft, two picks ahead of Jim Kelly. He split his four-year NFL career between the Bills and the Los Angeles Rams, accumulating 134 receptions for 1501 yards with 9 touchdowns. His final season in 1986 was cut short due to a career ending leg injury.

Hunter died on June 11, 2024, at the age of 64.
