= John Misko =

American football player (born 1954)

No. 6, 14
- Position: Punter

Personal information
- Born: October 1, 1954 (age 72); Highland Park, Michigan, U.S.
- Listed height: 6 ft 5 in (1.96 m)
- Listed weight: 207 lb (94 kg)

Career information
- High school: Porterville (CA)
- College: Oregon State
- NFL draft: 1980: undrafted

Career history
- Buffalo Bills (1980)*; New York Jets (1981)*; Los Angeles Rams (1982–1984); Detroit Lions (1987)
- * Offseason or practice squad member only

Career NFL statistics
- Punts: 207
- Punt yards: 8,370
- Longest punt: 67
- Stats at Pro Football Reference

John Charles Misko (born October 1, 1954) is an American football player who played in the National Football League (NFL) for the Detroit Lions and Los Angeles Rams.
