= Joe Shearin =

American football player (born 1960)

No. 64, 67
- Positions: Center, guard

Personal information
- Born: April 16, 1960 (age 66); Dallas, Texas, U.S.
- Listed height: 6 ft 4 in (1.93 m)
- Listed weight: 250 lb (113 kg)

Career information
- High school: Woodrow Wilson (TX)
- College: Texas
- NFL draft: 1982: 7th round, 181st overall pick

Career history
- Los Angeles Rams (1983–1984); Tampa Bay Buccaneers (1985); Dallas Cowboys (1987)

Awards and highlights
- All-SWC (1981)

Career NFL statistics
- Games played: 42
- Games started: 2
- Stats at Pro Football Reference

Joseph Leslie Shearin (born April 16, 1960) is an American former professional football player who was a center and guard in the National Football League (NFL) for the Los Angeles Rams, Tampa Bay Buccaneers, and Dallas Cowboys. He played college football for the Texas Longhorns.

== Early life ==
Shearin attended Woodrow Wilson High School, where he played as a defensive tackle. He accepted a football scholarship from the University of Texas at Austin. He suffered a mysterious illness, losing 30 pounds before being able to recover. He played as an offensive guard.

== Professional career ==
Shearin was selected in the seventh round (181st overall) of the 1982 NFL draft. He was released on August 27, 1985.

In 1985, he signed with the Tampa Bay Buccaneers as a free agent, playing in 10 games. He was released before the start of the 1986 season.

In 1987, he was signed as a free agent by the Dallas Cowboys. He was released on September 14.

== Personal life ==
Following his professional football career, Shearin attended and graduated from Baylor Law School with a Juris Doctor in 1990. Currently, he is in private practice in Dallas, Texas, as a highly rated, Board Certified criminal defense attorney.
