= Russ Bolinger =

American football player (born 1954)

No. 73
- Positions: Guard, tackle

Personal information
- Born: September 10, 1954 (age 72); Wichita, Kansas, U.S.
- Listed height: 6 ft 5 in (1.96 m)
- Listed weight: 255 lb (116 kg)

Career information
- High school: Lompoc (CA)
- College: UC Riverside; Long Beach State
- NFL draft: 1976: 3rd round, 68th overall pick

Career history
- Detroit Lions (1976–1982); Los Angeles Rams (1983–1985)

Career NFL statistics
- Games played: 121
- Games started: 76
- Fumble recoveries: 3
- Stats at Pro Football Reference

Russell Dean Bolinger (born September 10, 1954) is an American former professional football player who was an offensive lineman for nine seasons in the National Football League (NFL) from 1976 to 1985. He played college football for the UC Riverside Highlanders and Long Beach State 49ers. In 1985, he played for the Memphis Showboats of the United States Football League (USFL).

After football, he became an actor, broadcaster, playwright, sports writer/Detroit Free Press and an NFL scout. For the past 30 years he has worked as a recruiting coordinator for the University of Utah, an NFL scout for the Jacksonville Jaguars, Detroit Lions, Washington Redskins, St. Louis Rams, and Atlanta Falcons.
