= James McDonald (American football) =

American football player (born 1961)

No. 83
- Position: Tight end

Personal information
- Born: March 29, 1961 (age 65); Long Beach, California
- Listed height: 6 ft 5 in (1.96 m)
- Listed weight: 234 lb (106 kg)

Career information
- High school: Long Beach Poly
- College: USC (basketball)
- NFL draft: 1983: undrafted

Career history
- Los Angeles Rams (1983–1984); Detroit Lions (1985); Los Angeles Rams (1985, 1987)

Career NFL statistics
- Receptions: 14
- Yards: 168
- Touchdowns: 3
- Stats at Pro Football Reference

James Zell McDonald (born March 29, 1961) is an American former professional football player who was a tight end in the National Football League (NFL). He played for the Los Angeles Rams and Detroit Lions. He played college basketball for USC Trojans and did not play college football. His son, James McDonald, plays in Major League Baseball.
