= Doug Barnett =

American football player (born 1960)

No. 96, 79, 53
- Position: Defensive end

Personal information
- Born: April 12, 1960 (age 66); Montebello, California, U.S.
- Listed height: 6 ft 3 in (1.91 m)
- Listed weight: 250 lb (113 kg)

Career information
- High school: Edgewood (West Covina, California)
- College: Azusa Pacific
- NFL draft: 1982: 5th round, 118th overall pick

Career history
- Los Angeles Rams (1982–1983); Washington Redskins (1985); Atlanta Falcons (1987)

Career NFL statistics
- Fumble recoveries: 1
- Stats at Pro Football Reference

Douglas Shirl Barnett Jr. (born April 12, 1960) is an American former professional football player who was a defensive end and long snapper in the National Football League (NFL) for the Washington Redskins, the Los Angeles Rams, and the Atlanta Falcons.

Barnett was selected by the Los Angeles Rams in the fifth round (118th overall) of the 1982 NFL draft. He appeared in 58 regular-season games over five NFL seasons (1982–1987), including stints with the Rams, Washington Redskins, and Atlanta Falcons. During his professional career, he recorded one fumble recovery.

With the Rams, Barnett snapped for punts and kicks in 1982 and 1983, before being hurt in the 1983 playoffs, an injury that kept him out of the 1984 season. He was also a backup defensive end his first two NFL seasons for he likes of Jack Youngblood and Reggie Doss. He was released in August 1985 and trying to come back from his knee injuries.

The following year Barnett was signed by Washington and he played two games for them. He was released the following August and didn't play in the NFL in 1986. In 1987 he signed with th Atlanta Falcons, playing ten games for them.

He played college football for the Azusa Pacific Cougars. Barnett was selected as the first Azusa Pacific player to earn a spot on the NAIA All-American first team in 1981. He holds the school record for quarterback sacks in a single game (8) and in a single season (19).

He was inducted into the Azusa Pacific Hall of Fame in 1992. He was a nine-time All-American in college football and track and field, and a member of both the Azusa and NAIA Halls of Fame competing on the track team from 1978 through 1982.

In track and field, Barnett was a standout thrower, winning the NAIA national championship in the hammer throw in both 1981 and 1982. He also claimed the NAIA indoor shot put title in 1981. Overall, he garnered nine All-American honors across football and track and field during his collegiate tenure. After his retirement from professional football, he was the varsity football head coach for Bakersfield Christian High School.

== Head coaching record ==
=== College ===
Year	Team	Overall	Conference	Standing	Bowl/playoffs
Rocky Mountain Battlin' Bears (Frontier Conference) (1993–1995)
1993	Rocky Mountain	1–9	0–6	4th	
1994	Rocky Mountain	0–10	0–6	4th	
1995	Rocky Mountain	0–10	0–6	4th	
Rocky Mountain:		1–29	0–18		
Total:		1–29			
