= Carl Ekern =

American football player (1954–1990)

No. 55
- Position: Linebacker

Personal information
- Born: May 27, 1954; Richland, Washington, U.S.
- Died: August 1, 1990 (aged 36); Kern County, California, U.S.
- Listed height: 6 ft 3 in (1.91 m)
- Listed weight: 223 lb (101 kg)

Career information
- High school: Fremont (CA)
- College: San Jose State
- NFL draft: 1976: 5th round, 128th overall pick

Career history
- Los Angeles Rams (1976–1988)

Awards and highlights
- Pro Bowl (1986)

Career NFL statistics
- Sacks: 2
- Interceptions: 5
- Fumble recoveries: 5
- Stats at Pro Football Reference

Carl Frederick Ekern (/ˈɛkərn/ EH-kərn; May 27, 1954 – August 1, 1990) was a National Football League (NFL) linebacker.

== Biography ==
Ekern was born in Richland, Washington. He attended Fremont High School in Sunnyvale, California. Ekern was a graduate of San Jose State University and played professional football from 1976 to 1988 for the Los Angeles Rams. He appeared in the 1986 Rams promotional video, Let's Ram It, under the name of "Carl E, General of the D."

Ekern died of head injuries on August 1, 1990, when the Jeep he was driving ran off a highway near the Kern County town of Ridgecrest, California. At the time of the accident, Ekern was en route to Minden, Nevada, where he was a volunteer counselor and coach at the Rite of Passage, a camp for juvenile delinquents. The camp is located about 15 miles east of Lake Tahoe.

== Carl Ekern Spirit of The Game Award ==
The Carl Ekern award, honoring the former Rams linebacker, is the Los Angeles Rams award given to the player who best exemplifies sportsmanship, work ethic, and commitment to his teammates.
