= Barry Redden =

American football player (born 1960)

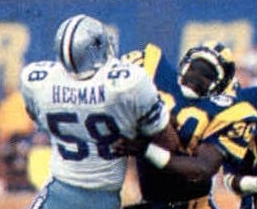
- Redden (right) playing for the Rams in 1986

No. 30, 20, 35
- Position: Running back

Personal information
- Born: July 21, 1960 (age 66); Sarasota, Florida, U.S.
- Listed height: 5 ft 10 in (1.78 m)
- Listed weight: 210 lb (95 kg)

Career information
- High school: Sarasota
- College: Richmond
- NFL draft: 1982: 1st round, 14th overall pick

Career history
- Los Angeles Rams (1982–1986); San Diego Chargers (1987–1988); Cleveland Browns (1989–1990)

Career NFL statistics
- Rushing yards: 1,735
- Rushing average: 4.4
- Rushing touchdowns: 10
- Stats at Pro Football Reference

Barry Dwayne Redden (born July 21, 1960) is an American former professional football player who was a running back for the Los Angeles Rams, the San Diego Chargers, and the Cleveland Browns of the National Football League (NFL). He played college football for the Richmond Spiders, where he was a First-team All-South Independent (1981) and was selected in the first round of the 1982 NFL draft by the Rams, where he spent much of his career as a back-up to Pro Football Hall of Fame running back Eric Dickerson.

Redden is currently the president of the NFLPA Retired Players-Houston Chapter.
