= Doug Reed =

American football player (born 1960)

No. 93
- Position: Defensive end

Personal information
- Born: July 16, 1960 (age 66); San Diego, California, U.S.
- Listed height: 6 ft 3 in (1.91 m)
- Listed weight: 254 lb (115 kg)

Career information
- High school: Lincoln (San Diego)
- College: San Diego State
- NFL draft: 1983: 4th round, 111th overall pick

Career history
- Los Angeles Rams (1984–1990)

Career NFL statistics
- Sacks: 22.5
- Fumble recoveries: 3
- Stats at Pro Football Reference

Douglas Reed (born July 16, 1960) is an American former professional football player who was a defensive end for seven seasons with the Los Angeles Rams of the National Football League (NFL). He played college football at San Diego State Aztecs.

== Early life ==
Reed prepped at Lincoln High in Southeast San Diego.

== College career ==
Reed played two seasons at San Diego State University after transferring from San Diego City College where he was a junior college All-America selection in 1980. As a senior at San Diego State, Reed logged 9 sacks and recorded a total of 91 tackles in his two seasons there.

== NFL career ==
Reed missed his rookie season of 1983 with a knee injury. In 1984, he played 9 games with 1 start at left defensive end. Reed suffered a sprained Achilles' tendon that kept him out of 7 games. In his first start against the 49ers Reed sacked Joe Montana for his first career sack. Prior to that start in week 16, Reed was a backup defensive end and played defensive tackle in pass-rushing situations.

In 1985 Reed took over for Jack Youngblood (who had retired) at left defensive end. Prior to the 1985 season Head coach John Robinson said, "Doug Reed has advanced from suspect to prospect to player." Reed responded with 45 tackles a 7.5 sacks and was considered solid against the run.

In 1986 Reed held out but returned to the team prior to the start of the season. Reed signed a 2-year deal on September 6, 1986, worth a reported $500,000. He backed up Shawn Miller for the first six games and started the final ten, recording 44 tackles and 6.5 sacks in 1986.

In 1987 Reed started all 12 non-strike games and totaled 40 tackles and 2 sacks. During the 1987 players' strike, Reed pelted "scab" players' vehicles with eggs as a way to show his support for the union. On August 17, 1988, Reed signed a two-year contract, ending a 27-day holdout. Reed started all 16 games and had 32 tackles and a sack. He played defensive tackle when the Rams went to their special "Eagle" defense which featured 5 linebackers, rather than the normal 4. Reed forced a key fumble by Neal Anderson to help the Rams in an early December 23-3 victory over the Chicago Bears.

In 1989 Reed played and started 11 games, with 30 tackles and 3 sacks. A severe ankle injury sidelined him for the final 5 games. In 1990, his final season, Reed held out once again (his third holdout in five seasons) and on September 6, 1990, signed a 1-year $400,000 contract after rejecting a $550,000 offer earlier in the summer. Reed started all 16 games and logged 27 tackles and 2 sacks.

In 1991 Reed signed a 1-year $200,000 contract in August, 1991, but after not being assured of a roster spot asked for his release so he could be free to sign with another team. On August 20, 1991, the Rams granted Reed his unconditional release.
