= Charles DeJurnett =

American football player (1952–2020)

No. 75, 73, 70
- Position: Defensive tackle

Personal information
- Born: June 17, 1952; Picayune, Mississippi, U.S.
- Died: November 11, 2020 (aged 68)
- Listed height: 6 ft 4 in (1.93 m)
- Listed weight: 263 lb (119 kg)

Career information
- High school: Crenshaw (Los Angeles, California)
- College: San Jose State
- NFL draft: 1974: 17th round, 418th overall pick

Career history
- Southern California Sun (1974–1975); San Diego Chargers (1976–1981); Los Angeles Rams (1982–1986)

Awards and highlights
- World Football League All-Star (1975)

Career NFL statistics
- Sacks: 21.5
- Fumble recoveries: 1
- Stats at Pro Football Reference

Charles Ray DeJurnett (/diːʒɜːrˈneɪ/ dee-zhur-NAY; June 17, 1952 – November 11, 2020) was an American professional football defensive tackle. He played college football for the San Jose State Spartans and was selected by the San Diego Chargers of the National Football League (NFL) in the 17th round of the 1974 NFL draft. From 1974 to 1986, he played professionally in both the World Football League (WFL) and NFL for the Southern California Sun, San Diego Chargers, and Los Angeles Rams. DeJurnett was selected to the WFL All-Star team in 1975.

== Early life and college career ==
Born in Picayune, Mississippi, DeJurnett grew up in Los Angeles and attended Crenshaw High School. After high school, DeJurnett played junior college football at West Los Angeles College. He transferred to San Jose State University, where he played on the 1972 and 1973 teams.

== Pro football career ==
In the 1974 NFL draft, the San Diego Chargers selected DeJurnett in the 17th round, 418th overall. DeJurnett began his pro football career with the Southern California Sun of the World Football League and played in 32 games for the Sun in 1974 and 1975. He was selected to the WFL All-Star defensive team in 1975.

He would remain in Southern California during his NFL career, playing for the San Diego Chargers from 1976 to 1980 and Los Angeles Rams from 1982 to 1986. In his NFL career, DeJurnett played in 118 games with 40 starts. He had a fumble recovery in 1980 with the Chargers. With the Rams, DeJurnett had three sacks in 1984 and one sack in 1985.

== Personal life ==
DeJurnett was married. On November 11, 2020, DeJurnett died from cancer at age 68.
