= Reggie Doss =

American football player (born 1956)

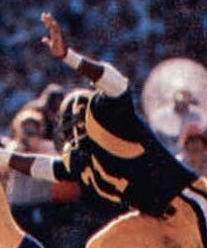
- Doss playing for the Rams in 1980

No. 71
- Positions: Defensive end, defensive tackle

Personal information
- Born: December 7, 1956 (age 69); Mobile, Alabama, U.S.
- Listed height: 6 ft 4 in (1.93 m)
- Listed weight: 265 lb (120 kg)

Career information
- High school: Sam Houston (TX)
- College: Hampton
- NFL draft: 1978: 7th round, 189th overall pick

Career history
- Los Angeles Rams (1978–1987)

Career NFL statistics
- Sacks: 31
- Fumble recoveries: 8
- Stats at Pro Football Reference

Reginald Lee Doss (born December 7, 1956) is an American former professional football player who was a defensive end for 10 seasons with the Los Angeles Rams of the National Football League (NFL).

He played college football for the Hampton Pirates. Before that, he played for Sam Houston High School in San Antonio, Texas.
