= Greg Meisner =

American football player (born 1959)

No. 69
- Position: Defensive tackle

Personal information
- Born: April 23, 1959 (age 67); New Kensington, Pennsylvania, U.S.
- Listed height: 6 ft 3 in (1.91 m)
- Listed weight: 257 lb (117 kg)

Career information
- High school: Valley (New Kensington,)
- College: Pittsburgh
- NFL draft: 1981: 3rd round, 63rd overall pick

Career history
- Los Angeles Rams (1981–1988); Kansas City Chiefs (1989–1990); New York Giants (1991)

Awards and highlights
- Second-team All-East (1980)

Career NFL statistics
- Sacks: 12
- Fumble recoveries: 2
- Interceptions: 1
- Stats at Pro Football Reference

Gregory Paul Meisner (born April 23, 1959) is an American former professional football player who was a defensive lineman in the National Football League (NFL) from 1981 to 1991. He played college football for the Pittsburgh Panthers. Meisner played in the NFL for the Los Angeles Rams, Kansas City Chiefs and New York Giants.

Meisner graduated from Valley High School at New Kensington, Pennsylvania in 1977.

He helped the Rams win the 1985 NFC West Division.

The Chiefs defense he played with in 1989 led the AFC in fewest total yards allowed and fewest passing yards allowed.

In 11 seasons he had 12 sacks, one interception for 20 yards and a kickoff return for 17 yards.

Meisner was the head coach of the Hempfield Area High School football team in Greensburg, Pennsylvania with a record of (17-50) by the time he resigned on November 18, 2011; however, he remained the Athletic Director until 2019.

Meisner has two sons who went to Division I schools for football. His son Greg Jr. went to the University of Kentucky and Shane went to Rutgers University.
