= Nolan Cromwell =

American football player and coach (born 1955)

No. 21
- Position: Defensive back

Personal information
- Born: January 30, 1955 (age 71); Smith Center, Kansas, U.S.
- Listed height: 6 ft 1 in (1.85 m)
- Listed weight: 200 lb (91 kg)

Career information
- High school: Ransom
- College: Kansas
- NFL draft: 1977: 2nd round, 31st overall pick

Career history

Playing
- Los Angeles Rams (1977–1987)

Coaching
- Los Angeles Rams (1991) Defensive and special teams assistant; Green Bay Packers (1992–1997) Special teams coordinator; Green Bay Packers (1998) Wide receivers coach; Seattle Seahawks (1999–2007) Wide receivers coach; Texas A&M (2008–2009) Offensive coordinator; St. Louis Rams (2010–2011) Wide receivers coach; Cleveland Browns (2012) Senior assistant/offense

Awards and highlights
- Super Bowl champion (XXXI); UPI NFC Defensive Player of the Year (1980); 3× First-team All-Pro (1980–1982); Second-team All-Pro (1983); 4× Pro Bowl (1980–1983); NFL 1980s All-Decade Team; Big Eight Offensive Player of the Year (1975); First-team All-Big Eight (1975)

Career NFL statistics
- Interceptions: 37
- Interception yards: 671
- Touchdowns: 4
- Stats at Pro Football Reference

Nolan Neil Cromwell (born January 30, 1955) is an American former professional football player who was a safety for the Los Angeles Rams of the National Football League (NFL). He played college football for the Kansas Jayhawks, where he earned All-American honors. Cromwell played for the Rams from 1977 through 1987 and was named to the Pro Bowl in four consecutive years, 1980 through 1983. He played on the Rams' 1979–1980 Super Bowl XIV team. He became a coach and was the Rams' wide receivers coach from 2010 to 2011.

== Early life ==
Cromwell was born in Smith Center, Kansas. He eventually played most of his high school sports career in the town of Ransom, Kansas. He attended Logan High School as a freshman, where he helped the basketball team win a state championship. After his family moved to Ransom, Cromwell earned the nickname the "Ransom Rambler." While attending Ransom High School Cromwell was a standout in football, basketball and track. He was a national AAU junior champion in the decathlon, a three-time state champion in track and earned consensus All-State honors in football and basketball. He was named the Wichita Eagle's high school football player of the decade for the 1970s.

== Playing career ==
=== College ===
Cromwell was an honorable mention All-America quarterback for the University of Kansas Jayhawks under coach Bud Moore. He started at quarterback for two seasons, throwing 92 passes and completing 33 for 606 yards. He is one of KU's ten 1,000-yard rushers in school history.

As a freshman in 1973 under Coach Don Fambrough, he was the starting free safety in the Liberty Bowl. After being a two-year starter and All Big 8 performer at safety, he made the move to quarterback where he broke several KU, Big Eight and NCAA records for rushing by a quarterback. In 1975, Cromwell rushed 294 and 187 yards in the Oregon State and Wisconsin games, respectively, and finished the season with 1,124 rushing yards. He also scored a touchdown in a 23–3 win over the University of Oklahoma, which was ranked #1 at the time and the defending national champions. In 1975, he was named Big 8 Offensive Player of the Year by the AP. Despite playing in just 18 games on offense at Kansas (he suffered a season-ending knee injury in his senior year when the Jayhawks were 5-1 and ranked in the top 10), he is 13th on the school's all-time rushing charts and is the top rushing quarterback. He holds the Kansas record for most rushes (24) by a Kansas player in a Bowl game (set vs. Pittsburgh in the 1975 Sun Bowl).

Cromwell also earned All-America honors in the 600-yard run and the 440 intermediate hurdles while setting KU records in the 600-meter and 400-meter yard runs, the intermediate hurdles (a record he still holds at 49:47) and the decathlon and qualified for the US Olympic trials in the low hurdles.

He was part of the Big-8 champion mile relay team in 1975 and 1976 and was the Big-8 440-yd/400-meter hurdle champ in both 1975 and 1976. With Cromwell's contributions the 1975 Jayhawk track team finished ranked second in the NCAA in outdoor track and fifth in indoor track while capturing both titles for the Big-8 Conference. In 1976 they repeated as Big-8 indoor champs and were second in outdoor while finishing tied for 9th in the NCAA in indoor competition and tied for 20th in outdoor competition. In 1977, he was voted Big Eight Athlete of the Year.

Cromwell was inducted into the Kansas Sports Hall of Fame in 1996.

=== NFL ===
Cromwell was drafted by the Los Angeles Rams as a defensive back in the second round, with the 31st overall pick, in 1977 and played his entire 11-year career in Los Angeles. He was the Rams' nickelback in 1977 and 1978 and a standout on special teams; running a fake field goal as a holder was Cromwell's specialty. In 1979, he won the starting free safety position and was named second-team All-NFC.

He was named the 1980 NFC Defensive Player of the Year by UPI and by the Kansas Committee of 101, and was named by Football Digest as the NFL Defensive Back of the Year in four consecutive years: 1980 through 1983. He was also selected to play in four consecutive Pro Bowls, from 1980 to 1983. Cromwell was part of the Rams defenses that performed well in the late 1970s as well as the Top 10 defenses of 1985 and 1986 when Rams qualified for the playoffs five of his last six seasons.

At the time of his retirement, he was the Rams' all-time leader in interception return yardage with 671 yards on 37 interceptions. After retirement, he was named to the NFL 1980s All-Decade Team and the Orange County Sports Hall of Fame. The Professional Football Researchers Association named Cromwell to the PRFA Hall of Very Good Class of 2014.

Along with his various accomplishments on the field, Cromwell also starred and "danced" in the 1986 Rams promotional video Let's Ram It, rapping "I like to ram it, as you can see, nobody likes ramming it more than me," after introducing himself as "Hollywood handsome, Dodge City tough."

== Coaching career ==
=== NFL ===
After retirement as an active player, Cromwell began his coaching career with the Rams. He served as a defensive and special teams assistant in 1991 before being hired by Mike Holmgren to coach special teams for the Green Bay Packers in 1992. From 1992 to 1997, Cromwell headed up the special teams for the Packers. The Packers' punt return unit led the NFL in 1996 with a 15.1-yard return average. Five different times during the 1996 season, one of Cromwell's players was honored as Special Teams Player of the Week. Also in 1996, the Packers won Super Bowl XXXI against the New England Patriots in New Orleans with special teams player Desmond Howard winning the Super Bowl MVP honors. The following year, the Packers reached Super Bowl XXXII in San Diego against the Denver Broncos. In 1998, he moved from special teams to coach the Packers' wide receivers and Cromwell worked with the wide receivers at Green Bay in 1998 helping Pro Bowler Antonio Freeman lead the NFL with 1,424 yards on 84 catches

After two Super Bowl appearances with Green Bay, in 1996 and 1997, Cromwell followed Holmgren to the Seattle Seahawks to coach the wide receivers. Cromwell's 2002 wide receiver corps set a franchise record for 300-yard (five) and 400-yard (two) passing games and in 2003 helped quarterback Matt Hasselbeck set a club record with 3,841 passing yardsIn Seattle, Cromwell again made a Super Bowl appearance as a coach during the Seahawks' 2005 season.

Cromwell was hired by the St. Louis Rams as their wide receivers coach on February 10, 2010. Cromwell and the entire coaching staff were fired following the 2011 season in which the team posted a 2–14 record.

On January 18, 2012, Cromwell was hired as the Senior Offensive Assistant of the Cleveland Browns.

=== College ===
On January 5, 2008, Texas A&M head coach Mike Sherman named Cromwell to be his offensive coordinator. When asked by media as to why he chose Cromwell, Sherman responded "I’ve always been impressed with him and the job he did in (the NFL). He's excited about being part of college football."

On February 10, 2010, Cromwell returned to the NFL as a wide receiver coach for the Rams and worked with the likes of Donnie Avery, Mark Clayton, Brandon Gibson, and other to get into synch with new Rams quarterback Sam Bradford.

== Personal life ==
Nolan married former Rams cheerleader and Miss Hollywood USA 1980–81 Mary Lynne Gehr. They have two children, Lance and Jennifer.
