= LeRoy Irvin =

American football player and coach (1957–2026)

- Irvin in 2017

No. 47
- Position: Cornerback

Personal information
- Born: September 15, 1957; Fort Dix, New Jersey, U.S.
- Died: July 2, 2026 (aged 68); San Diego, California, U.S.
- Listed height: 5 ft 11 in (1.80 m)
- Listed weight: 184 lb (83 kg)

Career information
- High school: Glenn Hills (Augusta, Georgia)
- College: Kansas
- NFL draft: 1980: 3rd round, 70th overall pick

Career history
- Los Angeles Rams (1980–1989); Detroit Lions (1990)

Awards and highlights
- 3× First-team All-Pro (1981, 1982, 1986); Second-team All-Pro (1985); 2× Pro Bowl (1985, 1986); 2× Second-team All-Big Eight (1978, 1979)

Career NFL statistics
- Interceptions: 35
- Fumble recoveries: 13
- Touchdowns: 11
- Stats at Pro Football Reference

LeRoy Irvin Jr. (September 15, 1957 – July 2, 2026) was an American professional football player who was a cornerback in the National Football League (NFL), primarily with the Los Angeles Rams from 1980 to 1989. He was selected to the Pro Bowl in 1986 and 1987. He holds the record for most punt return yards in a single game (207), set against the Atlanta Falcons in 1981. Irvin was one of only a few players in NFL history to be named All-Pro at two positions. Irvin was born in Fort Dix, New Jersey, and attended Glenn Hills High School in Augusta, Georgia. He played college football for the Kansas Jayhawks, earning second-team all-conference honors in the Big Eight in 1978 and 1979.

Irvin made two Pro Bowl appearances (1985 and 1986) and was named All-Pro four times (1981, 1982, 1985, and 1986). He was an assistant football coach at California State University, Northridge in 1992.

== Post-playing career ==
Irvin worked with former Los Angeles Rams teammate Vince Ferragamo at End Zone Mortgage in Anaheim Hills, California. He started a company called Original Mini's Inc with former Rams teammates Eric Dickerson, Larry Westbrook, and Mike Hope. The company holds an NFL license and offers a line of NFL Licensed products. In the 1986 Rams promotional video, Let's Ram It, he called himself the "Iceman" and stated that interceptions were his game.

== Personal life and death ==
Irvin was the father of four children (Leroy III, Charles, Sarah, and Julius) and resided in Rosarito, Mexico . He died at age 68 in San Diego, California on 2 July 2026. His death certificate stated the cause of his passing as “acute hypoxic respiratory failure from neck mass obstruction.” Aspiration pneumonia and head and neck squamous cell carcinoma were listed as contributing conditions.
