= Eric Dickerson =

American football player (born 1960)

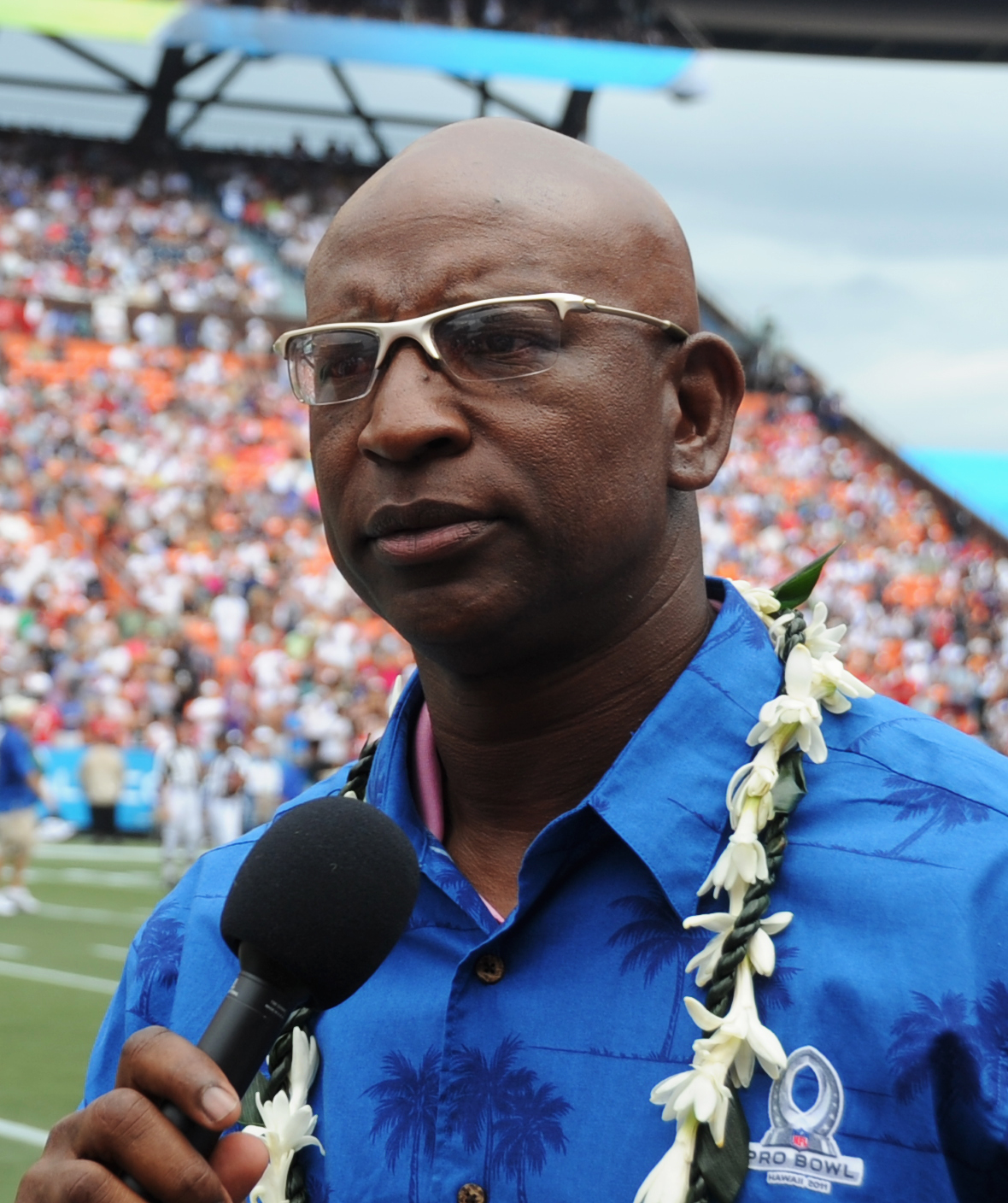
- Dickerson in 2014

No. 29
- Position: Running back

Personal information
- Born: September 2, 1960 (age 66); Sealy, Texas, U.S.
- Listed height: 6 ft 3 in (1.91 m)
- Listed weight: 220 lb (100 kg)

Career information
- High school: Sealy
- College: SMU (1979–1982)
- NFL draft: 1983: 1st round, 2nd overall pick

Career history
- Los Angeles Rams (1983–1987); Indianapolis Colts (1987–1991); Los Angeles Raiders (1992); Atlanta Falcons (1993)

Awards and highlights
- NFL Offensive Player of the Year (1986); NFL Offensive Rookie of the Year (1983); 3× UPI NFC Offensive Player of the Year (1983, 1984, 1986); 5× First-team All-Pro (1983, 1984, 1986–1988); 6× Pro Bowl (1983, 1984, 1986–1989); 4× NFL rushing yards leader (1983, 1984, 1986, 1988); NFL rushing touchdowns co-leader (1984); NFL 1980s All-Decade Team; NFL 100th Anniversary All-Time Team; PFWA All-Rookie Team (1983); St. Louis Football Ring of Fame; Indianapolis Colts Ring of Honor; Los Angeles Rams No. 29 retired; Unanimous All-American (1982); Second-team All-American (1981); 2× First-team All-SWC (1981, 1982); 2× SWC Offensive Player of the Year (1981, 1982); SMU Mustangs Jersey No. 19 honored; NFL records: Most rushing yards in a season: 2,105; Most rushing yards in a season by a rookie: 1,808; Most rushing yards in a playoff game: 248

Career NFL statistics
- Rushing yards: 13,259
- Rushing average: 4.4
- Rushing touchdowns: 90
- Receptions: 281
- Receiving yards: 2,137
- Receiving touchdowns: 6
- Stats at Pro Football Reference
- Pro Football Hall of Fame
- College Football Hall of Fame

Eric Demetric Dickerson (born September 2, 1960) is an American former professional football player who was a running back for 11 seasons in the National Football League (NFL). He played college football for the SMU Mustangs, earning unanimous All-American honors in 1982. Dickerson was selected second overall in the 1983 NFL draft by the Los Angeles Rams, and later played for the Indianapolis Colts, Los Angeles Raiders, and Atlanta Falcons. During his NFL career, Dickerson rushed for over 13,000 yards. He holds the NFL's single-season rushing record with 2,105 yards, set in 1984. Dickerson was inducted into the Pro Football Hall of Fame in 1999 and was named to the NFL 100th Anniversary All-Time Team. He is widely regarded as one of the greatest running backs of all time. Dickerson wore prescription goggles throughout his career due to myopia.

== Recruitment and college career ==
Dickerson committed to Texas A&M University before reconsidering and deciding amongst the University of Oklahoma, University of Southern California and Southern Methodist University (SMU). His great-grandaunt talked him into staying in the state of Texas to attend SMU because she liked Mustangs coach Ron Meyer. Dickerson was the subject of recruiting controversy when he started driving a new Pontiac Trans Am during his senior year of high school. According to myth, Dickerson began driving the vehicle about the same time he committed to A&M, and, when he signed with SMU, he purportedly stopped driving the vehicle because it "had been destroyed by a vengeful Aggie". Ron Meyer called the car the "Trans A&M". At the time, he said his grandmother from Mexico had purchased it for him. Dickerson has refused to answer whether he accepted anything to attend SMU, saying, "Even if I did take something, I still wouldn't tell." He later admitted that SMU paid him $500 or $1,000 a month. In 2022, Dickerson admitted that the Trans Am had been paid for by A&M boosters, and that in an attempt to hide the impropriety, one of his family members made the purchase and was reimbursed by the boosters. Dickerson said that he later sold the car to an SMU teammate.

Initially, Dickerson shared carries with Craig James and Charles Waggoner, all three blue-chip recruits in 1979. However, the latter was hurt returning a kickoff their freshman season, leaving Dickerson and James to lead SMU's running attack, called the Pony Express. Dickerson gained 4,450 yards on 790 carries to break Earl Campbell's Southwest Conference record for yards and attempts. His 48 career touchdowns tied Doak Walker's SMU total for career scoring. In his senior year, despite splitting time with James, Dickerson finished third in the Heisman Trophy voting, behind Herschel Walker and John Elway. He was also a first-team All-American in 1982 and a second-team All-American in 1981.

== Professional career ==
=== Los Angeles Rams ===
Before the 1983 NFL draft, the Houston Oilers said that they would draft Dickerson second if they did not make a trade. Dickerson's family opposed him playing for the Oilers — although Dickerson himself was merely cool about doing so — while, like John Elway, Dickerson would have flatly refused to play for the Baltimore Colts (Note: The Colts had the first choice in the draft, but were considering trading it because Elway, unanimously regarded as the best prospect in the draft, said publicly he would not play for the Colts and preferred to play baseball in the New York Yankees' minor league farm system.) had they drafted him. A trade with the Oilers saw the Los Angeles Rams acquire the second pick, which they used to draft Dickerson. Although he considered going to the Los Angeles Express in the United States Football League, Dickerson ultimately decided to play for the Rams. An immediate success, he established rookie records for most rushing attempts (390), most rushing yards gained (1,808) and most touchdowns rushing (18), including another two receiving touchdowns. His efforts earned him All-Pro, Pro Bowl, Player of the Year and Rookie of the Year honors.

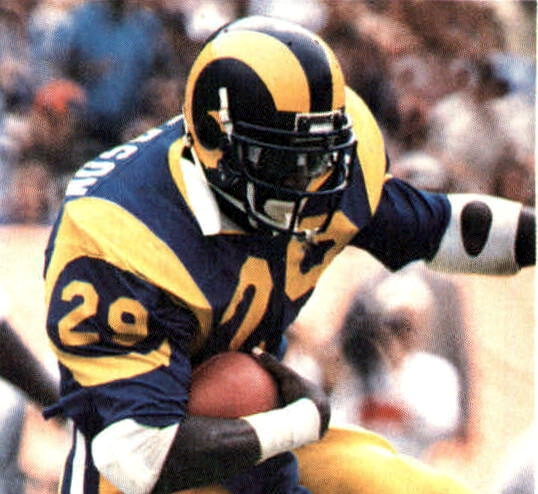
Dickerson set the NFL rushing record in 1984 while earning many awards

In his second season, Dickerson continued his onslaught on the NFL record book becoming a member of the 2,000-yard club. Twelve times in 1984, Dickerson gained more than 100 yards rushing, breaking the record of 100-yard games in a season held by O. J. Simpson. His 2,105 total yards rushing beat Simpson's 1973 NFL season record of 2,003 yards (Dickerson having reached 2,007 yards after 15 games), but since the NFL expanded the regular season from 14 to 16 games in 1978, Dickerson had the benefit of playing in two additional games. No one has since rushed for more yards in a single NFL season. Dickerson's 5.6 yards per carry led the Rams to a playoff berth in 1984.

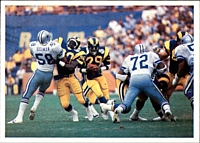
Dickerson (#29) rushing the ball through the Cowboys' defense in the 1985-86 NFC Divisional Playoffs Game

Although he rushed for 1,234 yards in 1985 while missing the first two games due to a contract dispute, Dickerson missed the Pro Bowl for the first time in his young NFL career. However, Dickerson went on to rush for a playoff record 248 yards against the Dallas Cowboys in postseason play.

=== Indianapolis Colts ===
The 1985 season marked the beginning of ongoing contract disputes between Dickerson and the Rams.

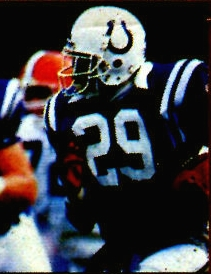
Dickerson in 1987

In 1987, after playing just three games for the Rams during the strike-shortened 1987 season, Dickerson was traded to the Indianapolis Colts in one of the NFL's biggest trades ever at that time. In a three-team deal, the Colts traded linebacker Cornelius Bennett, whom they drafted but were unable to sign to a contract, to the Buffalo Bills for their first-round pick in 1988, first- and second-round picks in 1989, and running back Greg Bell. The Colts in turn traded Bell and the three draft choices from Buffalo plus their own first- and second-round picks in 1988, their second-round pick in 1989, and running back Owen Gill to the Rams for Dickerson. With the picks the Rams took running back Gaston Green, wide receiver Aaron Cox, linebacker Fred Strickland, running back Cleveland Gary, linebacker Frank Stams, and defensive back Darryl Henley. The trade reunited Dickerson with Ron Meyer, who had left SMU after Dickerson's junior season to take the head coaching position in New England and who was hired by the Colts in 1986 following Rod Dowhower's firing.

Although Dickerson played in just nine games with the Colts that year, he still managed to gain 1,011 yards to finish the season with 1,288. Dickerson also spearheaded a late season Colts run that helped the team to their first winning season (and first playoff berth) in 10 years.

In 1988, Dickerson, with 1,659 yards rushing, became the first Colt to lead the league in rushing since Alan Ameche in 1955. This would mark the apogee of Dickerson's career with the Colts (although he would gain 1,311 yards rushing in 1989). Also, 1989 was the year that he passed the 10,000-yard mark, becoming the fastest player ever to do so (91 games), accomplishing the feat faster than greats like Jim Brown (98 games), Barry Sanders (103 games), Emmitt Smith (106 games), and LaDainian Tomlinson (106 games). By 1989, he had set a new NFL record with seven straight seasons of more than 1,000 yards rushing, and led the league for four of those seasons. With the retirement of Tony Dorsett at the end of 1988, he became the leader among active players in career rushing yards, a position he occupied until his own retirement in 1993.

However, injuries, further contract disputes, and suspensions clouded Dickerson's final two seasons with the Colts. At age 29, he was the highest-paid running back in the NFL, receiving an annual reported salary of $1.4 million. Following prolonged contract disputes, the Colts placed Dickerson on the inactive list before the start of the 1990 season, where he stayed for seven weeks and lost more than $600,000 in salary. In his sixth game back from suspension, Dickerson rushed for 143 yards against the Bengals on 22 carries—this effort lifted him past Jim Brown to third place on the NFL career rushing list behind Walter Payton and Tony Dorsett. He was again suspended in November 1991, and amidst injuries and age, managed to run for only 536 yards that season. The Colts finished the year bottoming out with a 1–15 record.

Dickerson has described the trade to Indianapolis as the worst moment of his career, and stated that he disliked his time with the Colts.

=== Los Angeles Raiders ===
On April 26, 1992, Dickerson was traded by the Colts to the Los Angeles Raiders for their fourth- and eighth-round picks in the 1992 draft. There were occasional flashes of greatness—107 yards against the Broncos, 103 against the Chargers, where he recorded his 63rd and 64th career 100-yard games—but those would be his last. Dickerson also scored on a 40-yard touchdown run, reminiscent of his prime, in front of a nationally televised Monday Night audience in a game against Kansas City. That year, he led the team in rushing attempts and yards. However, Dickerson suffered from splitting carries with Marcus Allen by having the latter finish the second half.

=== Atlanta Falcons ===
The following season, Dickerson was traded to the Atlanta Falcons on July 7, 1993, for a sixth-round draft pick. He played in a backup role, making his final national televised appearance during the Monday Night Football game on September 27, 1993, when the Falcons hosted the Pittsburgh Steelers in a losing effort. The Falcons traded Dickerson and third-year cornerback Bruce Pickens to the Green Bay Packers for running back John Stephens on October 13.

The trade came a week after Dickerson said he had been told that the Falcons were waiving him because Coach Jerry Glanville wanted to use younger players. The next day, Falcons officials said that there had been a misunderstanding and that Dickerson had not been placed on waivers. Dickerson retired as the second-leading rusher of all time after failing a physical with the Packers.

On August 29, 2017, Dickerson signed a one-day contract to officially retire as a member of the Los Angeles Rams.

== Career statistics ==
Legend
	AP NFL Offensive Player of the Year
	NFL record
	Led the league
**Bold**	Career high

=== NFL ===
==== Regular season ====
Year	Team	Games		Rushing					Receiving				
Year	Team	GP	GS	Att	Yds	Avg	Lng	TD	Rec	Yds	Avg	Lng	TD
1983	LA	16	16	390	1,808	4.6	**85**	**18**	**51**	**404**	7.9	37	**2**
1984	LA	16	16	379	**2,105**	**5.6**	66	14	21	139	6.6	19	0
1985	LA	14	14	292	1,234	4.2	43	12	20	126	6.3	33	0
1986	LA	16	16	**404**	1,821	4.5	42	11	26	205	7.9	28	0
1987	LA	3	2	60	277	4.6	57	1	5	38	7.6	13	0
1987	IND	9	8	223	1,011	4.5	53	5	13	133	10.2	28	0
1988	IND	16	16	388	1,659	4.3	41	14	36	377	**10.5**	**50**	1
1989	IND	15	14	314	1,311	4.2	21	7	30	211	7.0	22	1
1990	IND	11	8	166	677	4.1	43	4	18	92	5.1	17	0
1991	IND	10	9	167	536	3.2	28	2	41	269	6.6	26	1
1992	LAR	16	15	187	729	3.9	40	2	14	85	6.1	15	1
1993	ATL	4	2	26	91	3.5	10	0	6	58	9.7	30	0
Career		146	136	2,996	13,259	4.4	85	90	281	2,137	7.6	50	6

==== Postseason ====
Year	Team	Games		Rushing					Receiving				
Year	Team	GP	GS	Att	Yds	Avg	Lng	TD	Rec	Yds	Avg	Lng	TD
1983	LA	2	2	33	115	3.5	20	0	**8**	20	2.5	8	0
1984	LA	1	1	23	107	4.7	24	1	0	0	0.0	0	0
1985	LA	2	2	**51**	**294**	5.8	55	**2**	4	6	1.5	7	0
1986	LA	1	1	26	158	**6.1**	**65**	0	0	0	0.0	0	0
1987	IND	1	1	15	50	3.3	14	0	7	**65**	**9.3**	**19**	**1**
Career		7	7	148	724	4.9	65	3	19	91	4.8	19	1

=== College ===
Season	Rushing					Receiving				
Season	Att	Yds	Avg	Lng	TD	Att	Yds	Avg	Lng	TD
1979	115	477	4.3	43	6	**6**	35	5.8	11	0
1980	188	928	4.9	54	5	**6**	**93**	**15.5**	**37**	**1**
1981	255	1,428	5.6	62	**19**	1	2	2.0	2	0
1982	232	**1,617**	**7.0**	**80**	17	**6**	60	10.0	35	0
Totals	790	4,450	5.6	80	47	19	190	10.0	37	1

== Honors ==
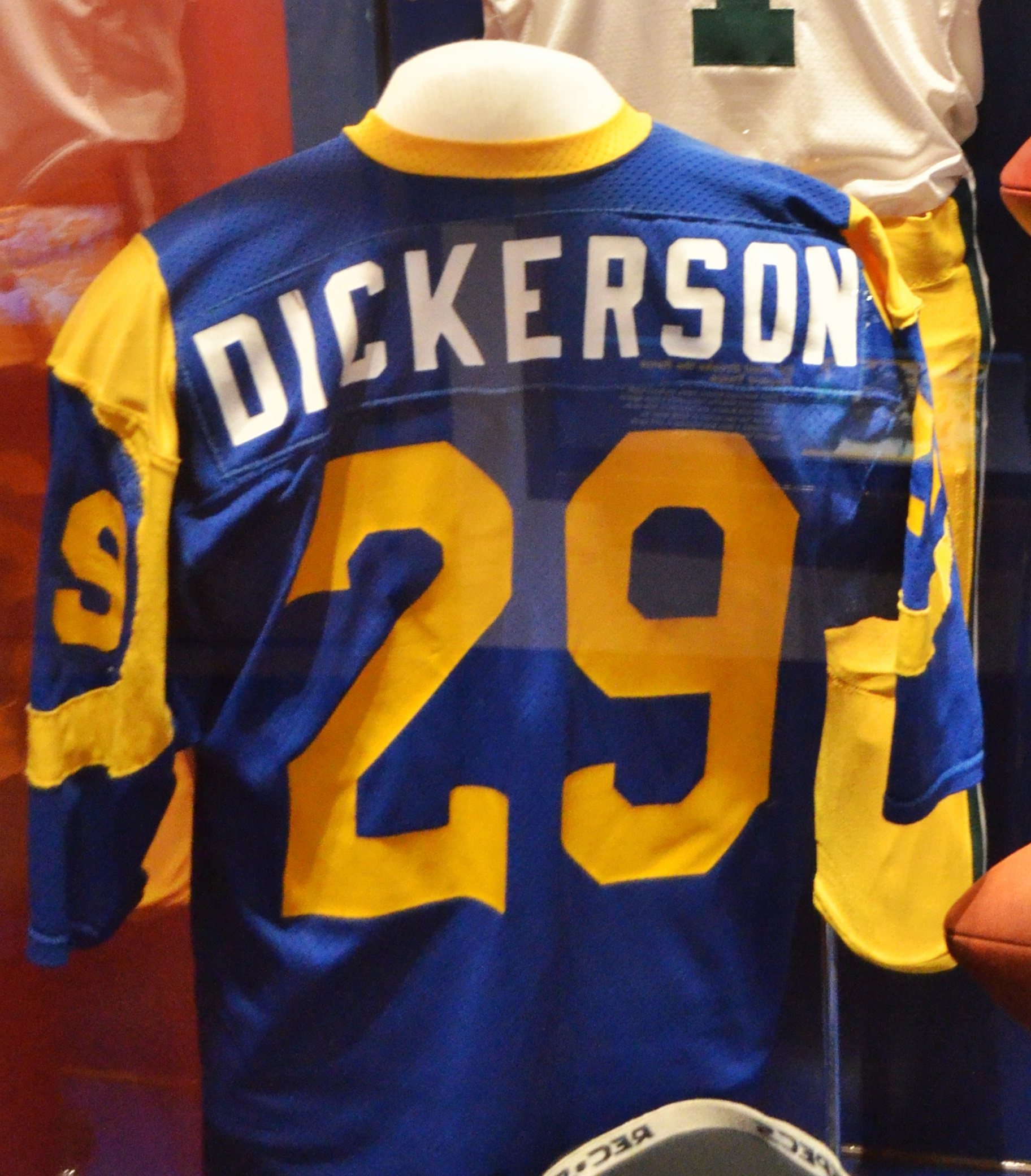
Eric Dickerson jersey shown at the Pro Football Hall of Fame in Canton, Ohio

Dickerson became the seventh back to gain more than 10,000 yards and the fastest ever to do so, reaching the milestone in just 91 games. During his 11-year career, Dickerson gained 13,259 yards rushing, which was second all-time at the time of his retirement, and rushed for 90 touchdowns. Dickerson gained another 2,137 yards and six touchdowns on 281 pass receptions. A six-time Pro Bowl selection, he was All-Pro in 1983, 1984, 1986, 1987 and 1988. In 1999, his first year of eligibility, Dickerson was selected to become a member of the Pro Football Hall of Fame. That same year, he was ranked number 38 on The Sporting News' list of the 100 Greatest Football Players. The following year, Dickerson provided on-field commentary during Monday Night Football broadcasts.

The Rams' No. 29 has been retired in Dickerson's honor. He was inducted into the Indianapolis Colts Ring of Honor on December 15, 2013, along with Marshall Faulk, another former Colts running back, who, coincidentally, also played for the Rams-albeit in St Louis.

In 1999, Dickerson was elected to the Pro Football Hall of Fame. In 2019, he was one of 12 running backs selected to the NFL 100th Anniversary All-Time Team, and was elected to the College Football Hall of Fame the following year. In 2024, Dickerson was inducted into the National High School Football Hall of Fame.

== Post-NFL career ==
Along with Melissa Stark, Dickerson served as a sideline reporter on Monday Night Football broadcasts for ABC during the 2000 and 2001 NFL seasons.

During the 2007 football season and 2016 football season, Dickerson worked as a broadcaster for KCBS television in Los Angeles, providing commentary for NFL pregame and postgame shows.

Dickerson started a sports memorabilia company called Original Mini Jerseys with former Los Angeles Rams teammate LeRoy Irvin. The company received their NFL license in 2006 and sells authentic miniature replica jerseys. He also owns an internet-based sporting goods company, E Champs.

Dickerson made a cameo appearance in the television series Hawaii Five-0 in 2014. In August 2016, he began hosting a two-hour Monday afternoon program on Los Angeles sports-talk station KLAC.

In 2017, Dickerson competed in the reality television game show The New Celebrity Apprentice. He was the third contestant "terminated" by host Arnold Schwarzenegger. That same year, Dickerson joined Fox Sports' FS1 as an NFL analyst.

In 2019, Dickerson played a role as LAFD Chief Brinkle in the TV Series S.W.A.T.. Four years later, he attended the fifth dinner service in Hell's Kitchen's 22nd season.

== See also ==
- List of National Football League rushing yards leaders
- List of National Football League rushing champions
- Living former players diagnosed with or reporting symptoms of chronic traumatic encephalopathy
