= Mike Wilcher =

American football player (born 1960)

No. 94, 54, 90
- Position: Linebacker

Personal information
- Born: March 20, 1960 (age 66); Washington D.C., U.S.
- Listed height: 6 ft 3 in (1.91 m)
- Listed weight: 238 lb (108 kg)

Career information
- High school: Eastern (Washington D.C.)
- College: North Carolina
- NFL draft: 1983: 2nd round, 36th overall pick

Career history
- Los Angeles Rams (1983–1990); San Diego Chargers (1991)

Awards and highlights
- First-team All-ACC (1982)

Career NFL statistics
- Sacks: 38.5
- Fumble recoveries: 6
- Interceptions: 4
- Stats at Pro Football Reference

Michael D. Wilcher (born March 20, 1960) is an American former professional football player who was a linebacker in the National Football League (NFL). He played college football for the North Carolina Tar Heels. He played in the NFL from 1983 to 1991 for the Los Angeles Rams and San Diego Chargers. He played his high school football at Eastern High School, a powerhouse in Washington DC.

At the University of North Carolina at Chapel Hill, Wilcher replaced Lawrence Taylor in the Tar Heel lineup, recording 68 tackles his senior season. He had 20 tackles for loss in his final two seasons combined. He was selected in the second round (36th overall pick) of the 1983 NFL draft. He was noted for good size (6–3, 240 pounds) and speed (4.73 forty-yard time).

With the Los Angeles Rams he spent his first year-and-a-half playing special teams and backing up outside linebackers Mel Owens and George Andrews. When Andrews suffered a knee injury in 1984, Wilcher took over the right outside linebacker position and held it though 1990. He started the final 5 games of 1984 and recorded 2 sacks. In 1985 Wilcher led the Rams with 12.5 sacks and recording 97 tackles. He ended his Rams career with 400 tackles, 38.5 sacks and 4 interceptions. He finished his NFL career playing two games with the San Diego Chargers, making his career total 125 games. He now lives in Maryland with his wife and three kids.
