= Dennis Harrah =

American football player (born 1953)

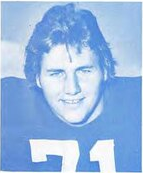
- Harrah in 1974

No. 60
- Position: Guard

Personal information
- Born: March 9, 1953 (age 73); Charleston, West Virginia, U.S.
- Listed height: 6 ft 5 in (1.96 m)
- Listed weight: 260 lb (118 kg)

Career information
- High school: Stonewall Jackson (WV)
- College: Miami (FL)
- NFL draft: 1975: 1st round, 11th overall pick

Career history
- Los Angeles Rams (1975–1987)

Awards and highlights
- First-team All-Pro (1986); 6× Pro Bowl (1978–1980, 1985–1987); Los Angeles Rams 40th Anniversary Team; First-team All-American (1974); West Virginia Sports Hall of Fame (2013); Orange County Sports Hall of Fame

Career NFL statistics
- Games played: 168
- Games started: 144
- Stats at Pro Football Reference

Dennis Wayne Harrah (born March 9, 1953) is an American former professional football player who was an offensive lineman for 13 seasons with the Los Angeles Rams of the National Football League (NFL). He played college football for the Miami Hurricanes. He played for and graduated from Stonewall Jackson High School in Charleston, West Virginia - now Stonewall Jackson Middle School.

== University of Miami ==
Harrah was a 1974 All-American selection by NEA and TSN, Time magazine as a tackle. He was a Second-team All-America pick by UPI and AP. Was a 6-5 259 senior who could run a 4.8 40-yard dash and bench press 500 pounds. He is a member of the University of Miami Sports Hall of Fame.

== Los Angeles Rams ==
Harrah was selected 11th overall in the first round by the Los Angeles Rams in the 1975 NFL draft. He helped the Rams win the NFC West six times (1975–79 and 1985) and the 1979 NFC Championship Game. During his tenure with the team, the Rams led the NFC in Points Scored in 1976, Total Yards Gained in 1980, and Yards Rushing in 1976 and 1980. He served as team captain for six years and played in the Pro Bowl six times.

As a rookie in 1975, Harrah backed up starter Joe Scibelli and played on special teams. In 1976, he took over at right guard and held that position for 12 seasons. He was nicknamed "Herk" by his teammates, short for Hercules. Harrah was one of the players who appeared in the 1986 Rams promotional video, Let's Ram It, introducing himself with the rapped line "I'm a mountain man from West VA."
