= 1981 Los Angeles Rams season =

NFL team season

- Owner: Georgia Frontiere
- General manager: Don Klosterman
- Head coach: Ray Malavasi
- Home stadium: Anaheim Stadium

Results
- Record: 6–10
- Division place: 3rd NFC West
- Playoffs: Did not qualify

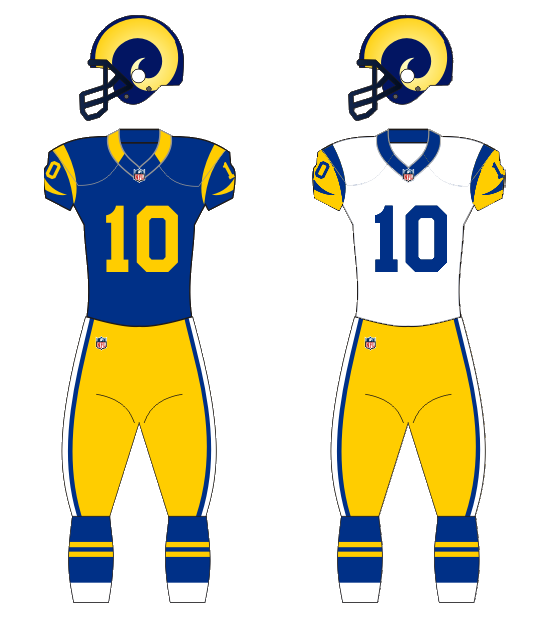
Los Angeles/St. Louis Rams uniforms from 1973 to 1999

The 1981 Los Angeles Rams season was the team's 44th year with the National Football League (NFL) and the 36th season in Los Angeles. The Rams looked to improve on their 11–5 record from 1980. The team failed to improve, finishing with a mediocre 6–10 and missed the playoffs for the first time since 1972. This year's Rams squad also suffered the humiliation of being the first to be swept by NFC West rival New Orleans.

For the season, the Rams converted from gray facemasks to blue facemasks.

== Offseason ==
=== NFL draft ===
1981 Los Angeles Rams draft
Round	Pick	Player	Position	College	Notes
1	9	Mel Owens	Linebacker	Michigan	
2	43	Jim Collins	Linebacker	Syracuse	
Made roster * Made at least one Pro Bowl during career

=== Undrafted free agents ===
1981 undrafted free agents of note
Player	Position	College
Jeff Kemp	Quarterback	Dartmouth

The Rams were touted as a possible Super Bowl contender prior to this season. However, Vince Ferragamo, who had previously led the Rams to Super Bowl XIV and set a Rams record the previous season with 30 touchdown passes, decided to bolt for the Canadian Football League's Montreal Alouettes. Pat Haden was named the starter, but with most of the offensive weapons that Ferragamo had, notably WR's Preston Dennard and Billy Waddy. Also, the Rams would benefit from the return of running back Wendell Tyler, who had missed most of the previous season with a hip injury from an automobile accident.

== Personnel ==
=== Staff / Coaches ===
1981 Los Angeles Rams staff
Front office: Owner/President – Georgia Frontiere; Executive Vice President/General Manager – Don Klosterman; Assistant General Manager – Jack Faulkner; Director of Player Personnel – John Math; Head coaches: Head Coach – Ray Malavasi; Offensive coaches: Offensive Coordinator – Lionel Taylor; Quarterbacks – Paul Lanham; Running Backs – Hewritt Dixon; Offensive Line – Dan Radakovich	Defensive coaches: Defensive Coordinator – Bud Carson; Defensive Line – Frank Lauterbur; Linebackers – Herb Paterra; Special teams coaches: Special Teams – Jim Vechiarella; Strength and conditioning: Conditioning – Clyde Evans

=== Roster ===
1981 Los Angeles Rams roster
Quarterbacks (QB): 11 Pat Haden; 9 Jeff Kemp; 10 Dan Pastorini; Running backs (RB): 32 Cullen Bryant; 44 Mike Guman; 22 Jairo Penaranda; 33 Jewerl Thomas; 26 Wendell Tyler; Wide receivers (WR): 88 Preston Dennard; 85 Drew Hill; 82 Willie Miller; 86 Jeff Moore; 80 Billy Waddy; Tight ends (TE): 84 Walt Arnold; 83 Lewis Gilbert	Offensive linemen (OL): 62 Bill Bain G; 60 Dennis Harrah G; 72 Kent Hill G; 73 Phil McKinnely T; 75 Irv Pankey T; 61 Rich Saul C; 78 Jackie Slater T; 56 Doug Smith T/G; Defensive linemen (DL): 97 Robert Cobb DE; 71 Reggie Doss DT; 79 Mike Fanning DT; 76 Cody Jones DT; 69 Greg Meisner DE; 95 Phil Murphy DT; 85 Jack Youngblood DE	Linebackers (LB): 52 George Andrews OLB; 57 Mario Celotto OLB; 55 Carl Ekern MLB; 51 Joe Harris OLB; 58 Mel Owens OLB; 53 Jim Youngblood OLB; Defensive backs (DB): 42 Kirk Collins FS; 21 Nolan Cromwell FS; 47 LeRoy Irvin CB; 20 Johnnie Johnson SS; 49 Rod Perry CB; 23 Lucious Smith CB; 37 Ivory Sully SS; 27 Pat Thomas CB; Special teams (ST): 3 Frank Corral K/P	Reserve: 35 Robert Alexander RB (IR); 81 Ron Battle TE (IR); 90 Larry Brooks DT (IR); 54 Howard Carson LB (IR); 83 Henry Childs TE (IR); 50 Jim Collins LB (IR); 31 George Farmer WR (IR); 77 Doug France T (IR); 59 George Lilja G (IR); 8 Jeff Rutledge QB (IR); Rookies in italics

== Regular season ==
=== Schedule ===
Week	Date	Opponent	Result	Record	Venue	Attendance
1	September 6	Houston Oilers	**L** 20–27	0–1	Anaheim Stadium	63,198
2	September 13	at **New Orleans Saints**	**L** 17–23	0–2	Louisiana Superdome	62,063
3	September 20	Green Bay Packers	**W** 35–23	1–2	Anaheim Stadium	61,286
4	September 28	at Chicago Bears	**W** 24–7	2–2	Soldier Field	62,461
5	October 4	Cleveland Browns	**W** 27–16	3–2	Anaheim Stadium	63,924
6	October 11	at **Atlanta Falcons**	**W** 37–35	4–2	Atlanta–Fulton County Stadium	57,841
7	October 18	at Dallas Cowboys	**L** 17–29	4–3	Texas Stadium	64,649
8	October 25	at **San Francisco 49ers**	**L** 17–20	4–4	Candlestick Park	59,190
9	November 1	Detroit Lions	**W** 20–13	5–4	Anaheim Stadium	61,814
10	November 8	**New Orleans Saints**	**L** 13–21	5–5	Anaheim Stadium	61,068
11	November 15	at Cincinnati Bengals	**L** 10–24	5–6	Riverfront Stadium	56,836
12	November 22	**San Francisco 49ers**	**L** 31–33	5–7	Anaheim Stadium	63,456
13	November 29	at Pittsburgh Steelers	**L** 0–24	5–8	Three Rivers Stadium	51,854
14	December 6	at New York Giants	**L** 7–10	5–9	Giants Stadium	59,659
15	December 14	**Atlanta Falcons**	**W** 21–16	6–9	Anaheim Stadium	57,054
16	December 20	Washington Redskins	**L** 7–30	6–10	Anaheim Stadium	52,224
Note: Intra-division opponents are in **bold** text.

=== Standings ===
NFC West
	W	L	T	PCT	DIV	CONF	PF	PA	STK
San Francisco 49ers^{(1)}	13	3	0	.813	5–1	10-2	357	250	W5
Atlanta Falcons	7	9	0	.438	3–3	6–6	426	355	L3
Los Angeles Rams	6	10	0	.375	2–4	5–7	303	351	L1
New Orleans Saints	4	12	0	.250	2–4	2–10	207	378	L4

== See also ==
Other Anaheim–based teams in 1981

- 1981 California Angels season
