= 1980 Los Angeles Rams season =

NFL team season

- Owner: Georgia Frontiere
- General manager: Don Klosterman
- Head coach: Ray Malavasi
- Offensive coordinator: Lionel Taylor
- Defensive coordinator: Bud Carson
- Home stadium: Anaheim Stadium

Results
- Record: 11–5
- Division place: 2nd NFC West
- Playoffs: Lost Wild Card Playoffs (at Cowboys) 13–34

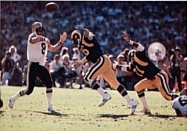
The Rams playing against the New Orleans Saints at Anaheim Stadium in 1980.

The 1980 Los Angeles Rams season was the team's 43rd year with the National Football League (NFL), the 35th season in Los Angeles, and the first season at Anaheim Stadium. The Rams improved from their 9–7 Super Bowl season from the previous year with an 11–5 record. They made the playoffs for the 8th straight season. They finished in 2nd place in the NFC West behind the Atlanta Falcons, which snapped Los Angeles' then-NFL record of consecutive division championships at 7. This record has since been snapped by the New England Patriots and Kansas City Chiefs, who both won 11 and 9 straight division titles in their respective divisions. The Patriots streak ended in 2020, while the Chiefs streak ended in 2025.

Coming off a Super Bowl appearance the previous season, the Rams had high hopes of winning the championship for the first time. After a slow start to the season, the Rams caught fire and won five games in a row to sit at 5–2. In week 15, the Rams hosted the Dallas Cowboys on Monday Night Football. In a highly anticipated matchup, the Rams wound up crushing the Cowboys 38–14. This win clinched a playoff berth for the Rams for the 8th straight season, still a team record. However, they couldn't beat Dallas when it mattered, losing at Texas Stadium in the NFC Wild Card game 34–13. Because the Steelers missed the playoffs for the first time since 1971, the Rams were the only team from 1973 to this year that never missed the playoffs.

== Offseason ==
=== NFL draft ===
1980 Los Angeles Rams draft
Round	Pick	Player	Position	College	Notes
1	17	Johnnie Johnson	Safety	Texas	
2	50	Irv Pankey	Tackle	Penn State	
3	58	Jewerl Thomas	Running back	San Jose State	
3	70	LeRoy Irvin	Cornerback	Kansas	
3	82	Phil Murphy	Defensive tackle	South Carolina State	
6	154	Mike Guman	Running back	Penn State	
7	176	Kirk Collins	Defensive back	Baylor	Made roster in 1981
7	192	Gerry Ellis	Running back	Missouri	
8	220	Tom Pettigrew	Tackle	Eastern Illinois	
9	248	George Farmer	Wide receiver	Southern	Made roster in 1982
10	276	Bob Gruber	Tackle	Pittsburgh	
11	304	Terry Greer	Wide receiver	Alabama State	
12	332	Kevin Scanlon	Quarterback	Arkansas	
Made roster * Made at least one Pro Bowl during career

== Personnel ==
=== Staff / Coaches ===
1980 Los Angeles Rams staff
Front office: Owner/President – Georgia Frontiere; Executive Vice President/General Manager – Don Klosterman; Vice President of Special Projects - James D. Dooley; Assistant General Manager – Jack Faulkner; Director of Player Personnel – John Math; Head coaches: Head Coach – Ray Malavasi; Offensive coaches: Offensive Coordinator – Lionel Taylor; Quarterbacks – Paul Lanham; Running Backs – Hewritt Dixon; Offensive Line – Dan Radakovich	Defensive coaches: Defensive Coordinator – Bud Carson; Defensive Line – LaVern Torgeson; Linebackers – Frank Lauterbur; Special teams coaches: Special Teams – Herb Paterra; Strength and conditioning: Conditioning – Clyde Evans

=== Roster ===
1980 Los Angeles Rams roster
Quarterbacks (QB): 15 Vince Ferragamo; 11 Pat Haden; 19 Bob Lee; Running backs (RB): 32 Cullen Bryant; 44 Mike Guman; 22 Lydell Mitchell; 33 Jewerl Thomas; Wide receivers (WR): 88 Preston Dennard; 85 Drew Hill; 82 Willie Miller; 86 Jeff Moore; 80 Billy Waddy; Tight ends (TE): 84 Walt Arnold; 81 Victor Hicks; 83 Terry Nelson	Offensive linemen (OL): 62 Bill Bain G; 77 Doug France T; 60 Dennis Harrah G; 72 Kent Hill G; 63 Greg Horton C/G; 75 Irv Pankey T; 61 Rich Saul C; 78 Jackie Slater T; Defensive linemen (DL): 90 Larry Brooks DT; 71 Reggie Doss DE; 89 Fred Dryer DE; 79 Mike Fanning DT; 76 Cody Jones DT; 95 Phil Murphy DT; 85 Jack Youngblood DE	Linebackers (LB): 52 George Andrews OLB; 55 Carl Ekern MLB; 51 Joe Harris OLB; 64 Jack Reynolds MLB; 58 Greg Westbrooks OLB; 53 Jim Youngblood OLB; Defensive backs (DB): 21 Nolan Cromwell FS; 41 Jeff Delaney FS; 47 LeRoy Irvin CB; 20 Johnnie Johnson SS; 49 Rod Perry CB; 23 Lucious Smith CB; 37 Ivory Sully SS; 27 Pat Thomas CB; Special teams (ST): 3 Frank Corral K/P	Reserve: 59 Bob Brudzinski OLB (Left squad); -- Howard Carson LB (IR); 42 Kirk Collins CB (IR); 31 George Farmer WR (IR); 66 Bob Gruber T (IR); 24 Eddie Hill RB (IR); 54 Ed McGlasson C (IR); 34 Elvis Peacock RB (IR); 67 Tom Pettigrew T (IR); 8 Jeff Rutledge QB (IR); 56 Doug Smith G (IR); 26 Wendell Tyler RB (IR); Rookies in italics

== Regular season ==
=== Schedule ===
Week	Date	Opponent	Result	Record	Venue	Attendance
1	September 7	Detroit Lions	**L** 20–41	0–1	Anaheim Stadium	64,892
2	September 11	at Tampa Bay Buccaneers	**L** 9–10	0–2	Tampa Stadium	66,576
3	September 21	Green Bay Packers	**W** 51–21	1–2	Anaheim Stadium	63,850
4	September 28	at New York Giants	**W** 28–7	2–2	Giants Stadium	73,414
5	October 5	**San Francisco 49ers**	**W** 48–26	3–2	Anaheim Stadium	62,188
6	October 12	at St. Louis Cardinals	**W** 21–13	4–2	Busch Memorial Stadium	50,230
7	October 19	at **San Francisco 49ers**	**W** 31–17	5–2	Candlestick Park	55,360
8	October 26	at **Atlanta Falcons**	**L** 10–13	5–3	Atlanta–Fulton County Stadium	57,401
9	November 2	**New Orleans Saints**	**W** 45–31	6–3	Anaheim Stadium	59,909
10	November 9	Miami Dolphins	**L** 14–35	6–4	Anaheim Stadium	62,198
11	November 16	at New England Patriots	**W** 17–14	7–4	Schaefer Stadium	60,609
12	November 24	at **New Orleans Saints**	**W** 27–7	8–4	Louisiana Superdome	53,448
13	November 30	New York Jets	**W** 38–13	9–4	Anaheim Stadium	59,743
14	December 7	at Buffalo Bills	**L** 7–10 (OT)	9–5	Rich Stadium	77,133
15	December 15	Dallas Cowboys	**W** 38–14	10–5	Anaheim Stadium	65,154
16	December 21	**Atlanta Falcons**	**W** 20–17 (OT)	11–5	Anaheim Stadium	62,469
Note: Intra-division opponents are in **bold** text.

=== Season summary ===
==== Week 1 vs Lions ====
Week One: Detroit Lions (0–0) at Los Angeles Rams (0–0)

Quarter	1	2	3	4	Total
**Lions**	10	7	10	14	**41**
Rams	6	14	0	0	**20**

at Anaheim Stadium, Anaheim, California

- Date: September 7
- Game time: 4:00 p.m.
- Game weather: Clear; 66 °F (19 °C)
- Game attendance: 64,892
- TV: CBS
- Box Score

Game information

**First quarter**

- LA – Drew Hill 98-yard kickoff return (kick failed). Rams 6–0.
- DET – Eddie Murray 52-yard field goal. Rams 6–3. Drive:
- DET – Billy Sims 10-yard run (Eddie Murray kick). Lions 10–6. Drive:

**Second quarter**

- LA – Cullen Bryant 1-yard run (Frank Corral kick). Rams 13–10. Drive:
- LA – Elvis Peacock 1-yard run (Frank Corral kick). Rams 20–10. Drive:
- DET – Billy Sims 1-yard run (Eddie Murray kick). Rams 20–17. Drive:

**Third quarter**

- DET – Eddie Murray 38-yard field goal. Tie 20–20. Drive:
- DET – Dexter Bussey 15-yard run (Eddie Murray kick). Lions 27–20. Drive:

**Fourth quarter**

- DET – Billy Sims 41-yard run (Eddie Murray kick). Lions 34–20. Drive:
- DET – Horace King 4-yard run (Eddie Murray kick). Lions 41–20. Drive:

Top passers

- DET – Gary Danielson – 10/19, 179 yards
- LA – Pat Haden – 13/24, 133 yards, 3 INT

Top rushers

- DET – Billy Sims – 22 rushes, 153 yards, 3 TD
- LA – Elvis Peacock – 15 rushes, 67 yards, TD

Top receivers

- DET – Billy Sims – 2 receptions, 64 yards
- LA – Preston Dennard – 4 receptions, 63 yards

=== Playoffs ===
Week	Date	Opponent	Result	Record	Venue	Attendance
Wildcard	December 28	at Dallas Cowboys	**L** 13–34	0–1	Texas Stadium	64,533

=== Standings ===
NFC West
	W	L	T	PCT	DIV	CONF	PF	PA	STK
Atlanta Falcons^{(1)}	12	4	0	.750	5–1	10–2	405	272	L1
Los Angeles Rams^{(5)}	11	5	0	.688	5–1	9–3	424	289	W2
San Francisco 49ers	6	10	0	.375	2–4	4–8	320	415	L2
New Orleans Saints	1	15	0	.063	0–6	0–12	291	487	L1

== See also ==
Other Anaheim–based teams in 1980

- 1980 California Angels season
