= History of the Los Angeles Rams =

American football team history

Home locations of the Rams franchise throughout their history

The Los Angeles Rams are a professional American football team that plays and competes in the National Football League (NFL). The Rams franchise was founded in 1936 as the Cleveland Rams in the short-lived second American Football League before joining the NFL the next year. In 1946, the franchise moved to Los Angeles. The Rams franchise remained in the metro area until 1994, when they moved to St. Louis, and were known as the St. Louis Rams from 1995 to 2015. The Rams franchise returned to Los Angeles in 2016. This article chronicles the franchise's history during their time in Los Angeles, from playing at the Los Angeles Memorial Coliseum between 1946 and 1979, to playing at Anaheim Stadium (now known as Angel Stadium of Anaheim) in Anaheim from 1980 to 1994, and its return to Southern California beginning with the 2016 to 2019 seasons playing temporarily at their old home the Los Angeles Memorial Coliseum before moving to SoFi Stadium in Inglewood in 2020 alongside the Los Angeles Chargers.

== History ==
=== 1946–1994: Origins in Los Angeles ===
==== 1946–1948: Starting over in Los Angeles ====
On January 12, 1946, Dan Reeves was denied a request by the other National Football League (NFL) owners to move his team, the Cleveland Rams to the city of Los Angeles and the then-103,000-seat Los Angeles Memorial Coliseum. Reeves threatened to end his relationship with the NFL and get out of the professional football business altogether unless the Rams transfer to Los Angeles was permitted. A settlement was reached and, as a result, Reeves was allowed to move his team to Los Angeles. Consequently, the NFL became the first professional coast-to-coast sports entertainment industry.

Reeves cited massive losses since buying the Rams in 1941; he'd lost $64,000 in 1945 alone. Despite winning the league title, the Rams had the second-lowest attendance in the league. Additionally, he did not believe he could compete head-to-head with the Cleveland Browns of the upstart All-America Football Conference. The Browns' owner, taxicab and real estate magnate Mickey McBride, had more resources than Reeves could even begin to match despite Reeves' own wealth. Additionally, the Browns were coached by former Ohio State head coach Paul Brown, a long-respected figure in Ohio coaching circles, and had a roster laden with Ohio collegiate stars. It appeared that the Browns were the only AAFC team that even potentially had a chance of chasing their NFL rivals out of town.

From 1933, when Joe Lillard left the Chicago Cardinals, through 1946, there were no Black players in American professional football. After the Rams had received approval to move to Los Angeles, the Rams entered into negotiations to lease the Los Angeles Memorial Coliseum. The Rams were advised that a precondition to them getting a lease was that they would have to integrate the team with at least one African-American; the Rams agreed to this condition. Subsequently, the Rams signed Kenny Washington on March 21, 1946. The signing of Washington caused "all hell to break loose" among the owners of the NFL franchises. The Rams added a second black player, Woody Strode, on May 7, 1946, giving them two black players going into the 1946 season.

The Rams were the first team in the NFL to play in Los Angeles (the 1926 Los Angeles Buccaneers were strictly a road team), but they were not the only professional football team to play its home games in the Coliseum between 1946 and 1949. The upstart All-America Football Conference had the Los Angeles Dons compete there as well. Reeves was taking a gamble that Los Angeles was ready for its own professional football team – and suddenly there were two in the City of Angels. Reeves was proved to be correct when the Rams played their first pre-season game against the Washington Redskins in front of a crowd of 95,000 fans. The team finished their first season in L.A. with a 6–4–1 record, second place behind the Chicago Bears. At the end of the season Walsh was fired as head coach. The Coliseum would be the home of the Rams for more than 30 years (the Dons merged with them in late 1949), but the facility was already over 20 years old on the day of the first kickoff. In 1948, halfback Fred Gehrke painted horns on the Rams' helmets, making the first modern helmet emblem in pro football.

The Rams' play-by-play announcer from 1937 through 1965 was Robert J. "Bob" Kelley, known as "The Voice of the Rams", also broadcast for NCAA teams Notre Dame and Michigan football as well as the Los Angeles Angels Pacific Coast League team and American League team. Kelley had an early evening talk show on L.A. radio station KMPC, that was considered by most sports enthusiasts as highly entertaining. At the beginning of the 1951 World Championship game after the kickoff, Kelley was able to cite every player on the field prior to the first snap from scrimmage, an 80-yard touchdown ("and I think he's going to go all the way").

==== 1949–1956: Three-end formation ====
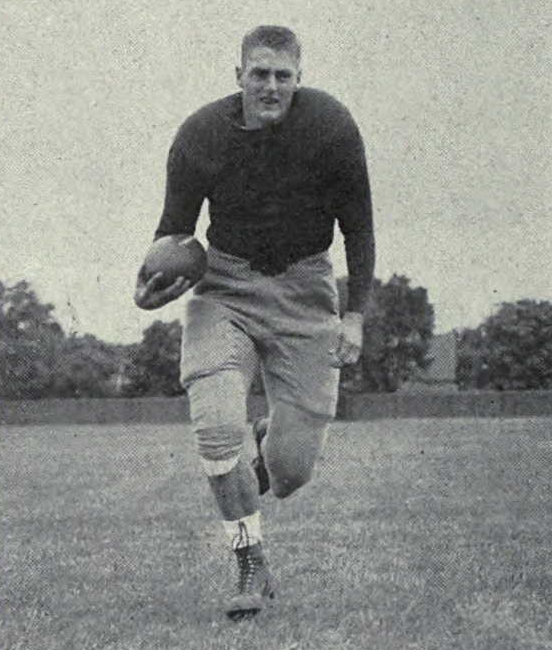
Elroy Hirsch spent nine seasons with the Los Angeles Rams from 1949 to 1957.

The Rams' first heyday in Southern California was from 1949 to 1955, when they played in the pre-Super Bowl era NFL Championship Game four times, winning once in the 1951. During this period, they had the best offense in the NFL, even though there was a quarterback change from Bob Waterfield to Norm Van Brocklin in 1951. The defining Offensive players of this period were wide receiver Elroy Hirsch, Paul "Tank" Younger, Van Brocklin and Waterfield. Teamed with fellow Hall of Famer Tom Fears, Hirsch helped create the style of Rams football as one of the first big play receivers. During the 1951 Championship season, Hirsch posted a then stunning 1,495 receiving yards with 17 touchdowns. The popularity of this wide-open offense enabled the Los Angeles Rams to become the first pro football team to have all their games televised in 1950. They would continue their success within the decade with trading for players such as running back Ollie Matson.

==== 1957–1964: Newcomers to L.A. and record attendance ====
In the late 1950s and early 1960s, the Los Angeles Rams went from being the only major professional sports franchise in Southern California and Los Angeles to being one of five. The Los Angeles Dodgers moved from Brooklyn in 1958, the Los Angeles Chargers of the upstart AFL were established in 1960, the Los Angeles Lakers moved from Minneapolis in 1960, and the Los Angeles Angels were awarded to Gene Autry in 1961. In spite of this, the Rams continued to thrive in Southern California. In the first two years after the Dodgers moved to California, the Rams drew an average of 83,681 in 1958 and 74,069 in 1959. The Rams were so popular in Los Angeles that the upstart Chargers chose to relocate to San Diego rather than attempt to compete with them. The Los Angeles Times put the Chargers plight as such: "Hilton [the Chargers owner at the time] quickly realized that taking on the Rams in L.A. was like beating his head against the wall."

During this time, the Rams were not as successful on the field as they had been during their first decade. The team's combined record from 1957 to 1964 was 24–35–1 (.407), but the Rams continued to fill the cavernous Los Angeles Memorial Coliseum on a regular basis. While the National Football League's average attendance ranged from the low 30,000s to the low 40,000s during this time, the Rams were drawing anywhere from 10,000 to 40,000 fans more than the league average. In 1957, the Rams set the all-time NFL attendance record that stood until 2006 and broke the 100,000 mark twice during the 1958 campaign.

===== Tanking out =====
The Rams posted losing records in all but two seasons between 1956 and 1966. In those two seasons, the club finished with a 6 and 6 record in 1957 followed by an 8 and 4 mark and a strong second place showing the next year. Led by business executive Pete Rozelle's shrewd understanding of how to use television as a (then) revolutionary promotional device, the Rams remained a business success despite the team's poor record. In a 1957 game against the San Francisco 49ers, the Rams set a record for attendance for a regular-season NFL game (102,368 people). The Rams drew over 100,000 fans twice the following year.

==== 1965–1969: The Fearsome Foursome ====
The 1960s were defined by the Rams great defensive line of Rosey Grier, Merlin Olsen, Deacon Jones, and Lamar Lundy, dubbed the "Fearsome Foursome." It was this group of players who restored the on-field luster of the franchise in 1967 when the Rams reached (but lost) the conference championship under legendary coach George Allen. That 1967 squad would become the first NFL team to surpass one million spectators in a season, a feat the Rams would repeat the following year. In each of those two years, the L.A. Rams drew roughly double the number of fans that could be accommodated by their current stadium for a full season.

George Allen led the Rams from 1966 to 1970 and introduced many innovations, including the hiring of a young Dick Vermeil as one of the first special teams coaches. Though Allen would enjoy five straight winning seasons and win two divisional titles in his time with the Rams he never won a playoff game with the team, losing in 1967 to Green Bay 28–7 and in 1969 23–20 to Minnesota. Allen would leave after the 1970 season to take the head coaching job for the Washington Redskins.

==== 1970–1972: Changes ====
Quarterback Roman Gabriel played eleven seasons for the Rams dating from 1962 to 1972. From 1967 to 1971, Gabriel led the Rams to either a first- or second-place finish in their division every year. He was voted the MVP of the entire NFL in 1969, for a season in which he threw for 2,549 yards and 24 TDs while leading the Rams to the playoffs. During the 1970 season, Gabriel combined with his primary receiver Jack Snow for 51 receptions totaling 859 yards. This would prove to be the best season of their eight seasons as teammates.

Reeves died in April 1971. His estate ran the team in the 1972 season before selling it to Chicago industrialist Robert Irsay for $19 million that spring-a handsome return on Reeves' purchase of the then-Cleveland Rams in 1941 for $135,000. Irsay then traded the Rams to Carroll Rosenbloom for his Baltimore Colts and cash. The Rams remained solid contenders in the 1970s, winning seven straight NFC West championships between 1973 and 1979. Though they clearly were the class of the NFC in the 1970s along with the Dallas Cowboys and Minnesota Vikings, they lost the first four conference championship games they played in that decade, losing twice each to Minnesota (1974, 1976) and Dallas (1975, 1978) and failing to win a league championship.

==== 1973–1979: NFC West champions ====
===== Chuck Knox's first stint =====
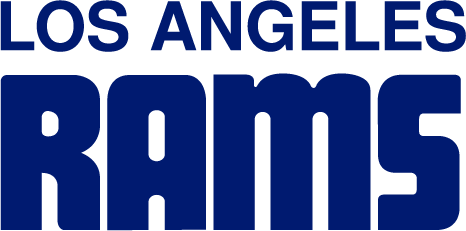
Wordmark logo, used by the Rams from 1973 to 1984

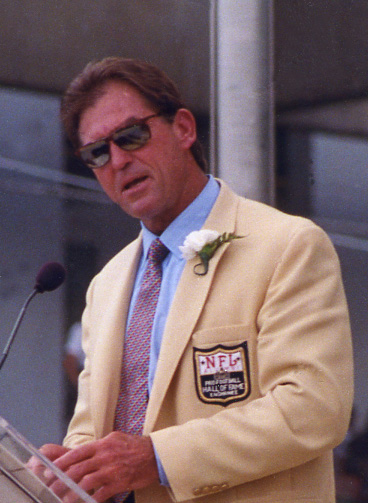
Jack Youngblood giving his Pro Football Hall of Fame induction speech in 2001

The Rams' coach for this run was Chuck Knox, who led the team through 1977. The Chuck Knox-coached Rams featured an unremarkable offense carried into the playoffs annually by an elite defensive unit. The defining player of the 1970s L.A. Rams was Jack Youngblood. Youngblood was called the 'Perfect Defensive End' by fellow Hall of Famer Merlin Olsen. His toughness was legendary, notably playing on a broken leg during the Rams' run to the 1980 Super Bowl. His blue-collar ethic stood in opposition to the perception that the Rams were a soft 'Hollywood' team. However, several Rams players from this period took advantage of their proximity to Hollywood and crossed over into acting after their playing careers ended. Most notable of these was Fred Dryer, who starred in the TV series Hunter from 1984 to 1991, as well as Olsen, who retired after 1976. During the 1977 offseason, the Rams, looking for a veteran quarterback, acquired Joe Namath from the Jets. In spite of a 2–1 start to the regular season, Namath's bad knees rendered him nearly immobile and after a Monday night defeat in Chicago, he never played again. With Pat Haden at the helm, the Rams won the division and advanced to the playoffs, but lost at home to Minnesota. Chuck Knox left for the Bills in 1978, after which Ray Malavasi became head coach. Going 12–4, the team won the NFC West for the sixth year in a row and defeated the Vikings, thus avenging their earlier playoff defeat. However, success eluded them again as they were shut out in the NFC Championship by the Cowboys.

==== 1979: First Super Bowl appearance ====
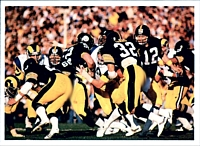
The Rams lost to the Steelers 19–31 in Super Bowl XIV

Ironically, it was the Rams' weakest divisional winner (an aging 1979 team that only achieved a 9–7 record) that would achieve the team's greatest success in that period. Led by third-year quarterback Vince Ferragamo, the Rams shocked the heavily favored and two-time defending NFC champion Dallas Cowboys 21–19 in the Divisional Playoffs, then shut out the upstart Tampa Bay Buccaneers 9–0 in the conference championship game to win the NFC and reach their first Super Bowl. Along with Ferragamo, key players for the Rams were halfback Wendell Tyler, offensive lineman's Jackie Slater and Kent Hill, defensive lineman's Larry Brooks and Fred Dryer and Pro Bowl defenders Jack Youngblood, Jim Youngblood and Jack "Hacksaw" Reynolds.

The Rams' opponent in their first Super Bowl was the defending champion Pittsburgh Steelers. The game would be a virtual home game for the Rams as it was played in Pasadena at the Rose Bowl. Although some oddsmakers set the Rams as a 10½ point underdog, the Rams played Pittsburgh very tough, leading at halftime 13–10 and at the end of the third quarter 19–17. In the end, however, the Steelers finally asserted themselves, scoring two touchdowns in the 4th quarter and completely shutting down the Rams offense to win their fourth Super Bowl, 31–19.

==== 1980–1982: The move to Anaheim ====
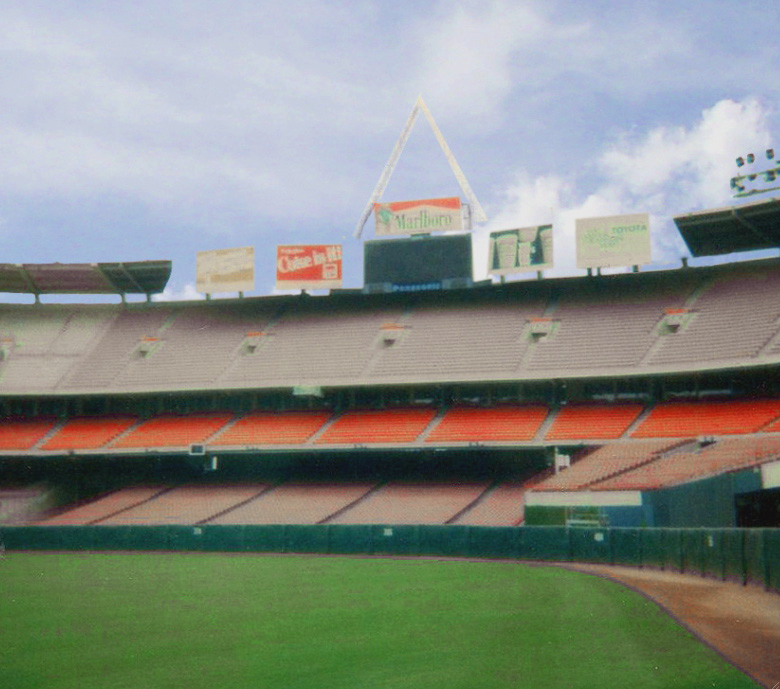
Anaheim Stadium, the home of the Los Angeles Rams from 1980 to 1994

Prior to the 1979 NFL season, owner Carroll Rosenbloom died in a drowning accident, and his widow, Georgia Frontiere, inherited 70 percent ownership of the team. Frontiere then fired stepson Steve Rosenbloom and assumed total control of Rams operations. As had been planned prior to Rosenbloom's death, the Rams moved from their longtime home at the Coliseum to Anaheim Stadium in nearby Orange County in 1980.

The reason for the move was twofold. First, the NFL's blackout rule forbade games from being televised in the team's local market if 85% of the tickets are not sold out 72 hours prior to opening kickoff. As the Los Angeles Memorial Coliseum seated 92,604 at the time, it was rarely possible to sell that many tickets even in the Rams' best years, and so most Rams home games were blacked out. Second, this move was following the population pattern in Southern California. During the 1970s and 1980s, the decline of manufacturing industries in the northeastern United States combined with the desire of many people to live in a warmer climate caused a large-scale population shift to the southern and western states. As a result, many affluent new suburbs were built in the Los Angeles area. Anaheim Stadium was originally built in 1966 to be the home of the California Angels. To accommodate the Rams' move, the ballpark was reconfigured and enclosed to accommodate a capacity of 69,008 in the football configuration. With their new, smaller home, the Rams had no problem selling out games.

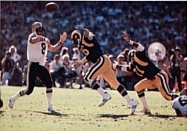
The Rams playing in their inaugural season at Anaheim Stadium in 1980

In 1980, the team posted an 11–5 record, but only managed a wild card spot and were sent packing after a loss to the Cowboys. Age and injuries finally caught up with the Rams in 1981, as they only won six games, were swept for the first time by the division rival New Orleans Saints, and missed the playoffs for the first time in nine years. After the 1982 season was shortened to nine games by a strike, the Rams went 2–7, the team's worst season since 1962, when they won only 1 game.

===== Competition with the Raiders =====
In 1982, the Oakland Raiders moved to Los Angeles and took up residence in the Rams' former home, the Los Angeles Memorial Coliseum. The combined effect of these two moves was to divide the Rams' traditional fanbase in two. The early 1980s were also rebuilding years for the club, while the Raiders were winners of Super Bowl XVIII in the 1983 season. Meanwhile, the Los Angeles Lakers won championships in 1980 and 1982 en route to winning five titles in that decade, the Los Angeles Dodgers won the World Series in 1981 and 1988, and even the Los Angeles Kings made a deep run in the playoffs in 1982. As a result, the Rams declined sharply in popularity during the 1980s even though the team remained a playoff contender.

==== 1983–1991: Robinson takes over the Rams and the Dickerson era ====
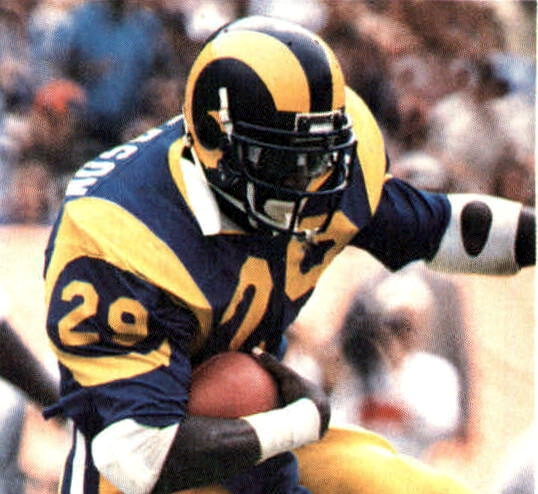
Eric Dickerson, one of the best running backs in history, was most famous for his time with the Los Angeles Rams. In 1984, Dickerson rushed for 2,105 yards in the season, a record that still stands today.

The hiring of coach John Robinson in 1983 provided a needed boost for pro football in Orange County. The former USC coach began by cutting the aged veterans left over from the 1970s teams. His rebuilding program began to show results when the team rebounded to 9–7 in 1983 and defeated Dallas in the playoffs. However, the season ended after a rout at the hands of the soon-to-be champion Redskins. Another trip to the playoffs in 1984 saw them lose to the Giants. They made the NFC Championship Game in 1985 after winning the division, where they would be shut out by the eventual champion Chicago Bears 24–0.

The most notable player for the Rams during that period was running back Eric Dickerson, who was drafted in 1983 out of SMU and won Rookie of the Year. In 1984, Dickerson rushed for 2,105 yards, setting a new NFL record. Dickerson would end his five hugely successful years for the Rams in 1987 by being traded to the Indianapolis Colts for a number of players and draft picks after a bitter contract dispute, shortly after the players' strike that year ended. Dickerson was the Rams' career rushing leader until 2010, with 7,245 yards. Despite this trade, the Rams remained contenders due to the arrival of the innovative offensive leadership of Ernie Zampese. Zampese brought the intricate timing routes he had used in making the San Diego Chargers a state-of-the-art offense. Under Zampese, the Rams rose steadily from 28th rated offense in 1986 to 3rd in 1990. The late 1980s Rams featured a gifted young QB in Jim Everett, a solid rushing attack in running back Greg Bell and a fleet of talented WRs led by Henry Ellard, Ron Brown and Flipper Anderson.

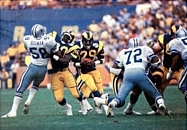
Dickerson (29) rushing through the Cowboys' defense in the 1985 NFC Divisional Playoff game

After a 10–6 season in 1986, the Rams were booted from the playoffs by the Washington Redskins. After one game of the 1987 season was lost to the players' strike, the NFL employed substitutes, most of which were given derogatory nicknames (in this case the Los Angeles Shams). After a 1–2 record, the Rams' regulars returned, but the team only went 6–9 and did not qualify for the postseason.

The Rams managed to return in 1988 with a 10–6 record, but then were defeated by Minnesota in the wild card round. Los Angeles won the first five games of 1989, including a sensational defeat of the defending champion 49ers. They beat the Eagles in the wild card game, then beat the Giants in overtime before suffering a 30–3 flogging at the hands of the 49ers in the NFC Championship Game.

Although it wasn't apparent at the time, the 1989 NFC Championship Game was the end of an era. The Rams did not have another winning season in their first stint in Los Angeles. They crumbled to 5–11 in 1990, followed by a 3–13 season in 1991.

==== 1992–1994: The end of the original Southern California team ====
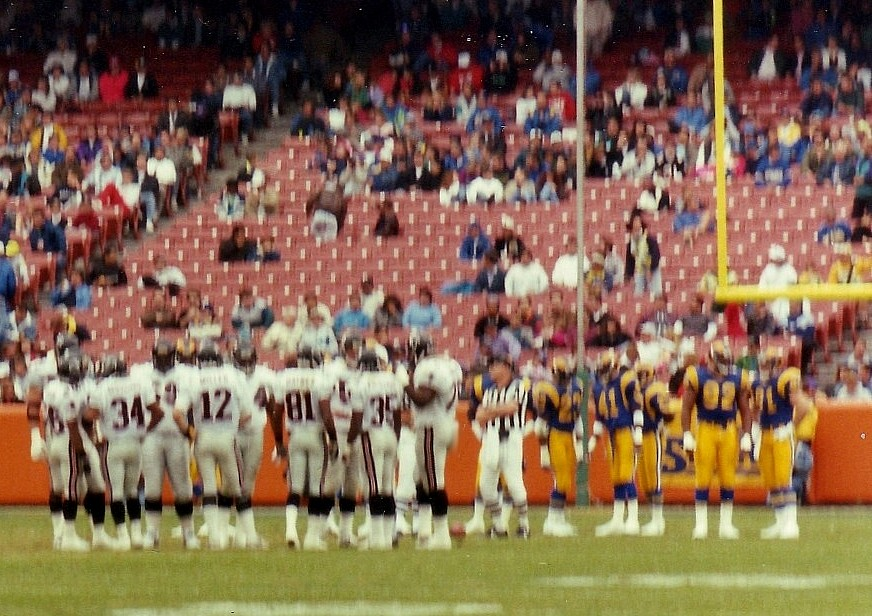
The Rams hosting the Atlanta Falcons at Anaheim Stadium in 1991

Robinson was fired at the end of the 1991 season. The return of Chuck Knox as head coach, after Knox’ successful stints as head coach of the Buffalo Bills and Seattle Seahawks, would not boost the Rams’ fortunes. His run-oriented offense marked the end of the Zampese tenure in 1993. Knox’ game plans called for an offense that would be steady, if unspectacular. Unfortunately for the Rams, Knox’ offense was not only aesthetically unpleasing, but dull and predictable by 1990s standards.

The Rams finished last in the NFC West during all three years of Knox’ second stint. Team management traded quarterback Jim Everett, and released All-Pro linebacker Kevin Greene, which set the franchise back. Moreover, general manager John Shaw was seen as squandering picks in the NFL Draft. Coming to the team at this time was Jerome Bettis, a bruising running back from Notre Dame. Bettis flourished in Knox’ offense, running for 1,429 yards as a rookie, and 1,025 in his sophomore effort.

As the losses piled up and the team was seen as playing uninspired football, the Rams’ already dwindling fan base was reduced even further. By 1994, support for the Rams had withered to the point where they were barely part of the Los Angeles sports landscape. With sellouts becoming fewer and far between, the Rams saw more of their games blacked out in Southern California.

===== Georgia moves the Rams to St. Louis =====
As has become increasingly common with sports franchises, the Rams began to blame much of their misfortune, including the front office missteps, on their stadium situation. With Orange County mired in a deep recession resulting largely from defense sector layoffs, neither Orange County nor the city of Los Angeles was prepared to build a taxpayer-financed stadium just for the Rams. Claiming that Southern California was so unprofitable that the Rams would go bankrupt without a new stadium, Mrs. Frontiere decided to move the team.

Rams helmet from 1989 to 1994

Georgia Frontiere initially attempted to relocate the Rams to Baltimore, but her fellow owners turned that proposal down. Mrs. Frontiere then sought to relocate the team to St. Louis. This move was initially voted down as well. The other owners (led by Buffalo's Ralph Wilson, the Jets’ Leon Hess, the Giants' Wellington Mara, Washington's Jack Kent Cooke, Arizona's Bill Bidwill and Minnesota's John Skoglund) believed that the Rams’ financial problems were due to the Frontieres’ mismanagement. When Georgia Frontiere threatened to sue the league, Commissioner Paul Tagliabue acquiesced to Frontiere's demands.

As part of the relocation deal, the city of St. Louis agreed to build a taxpayer-financed stadium, the Trans World Dome (now the Dome at America's Center) and guaranteed that the stadium's amenities would be maintained in the top 25% of all NFL stadiums. Frontiere waived the clause after a 10-year threshold period passed, as the city implemented a later plan to improve the stadium.

The move left many in the Los Angeles area, and many of those indifferent to the whole situation, embittered toward the NFL. That sentiment was best expressed by Fred Dryer, who at the time said "I hate these people (the organization and its owner) for what they did, taking the Rams logo with them when they moved to St. Louis. That logo belonged to Southern California." Steve Rosenbloom, the general manager of the team during Carroll Rosenbloom's tenure, opined that teams come and go, but for a team to leave Los Angeles—the second largest media market in America—for St. Louis (approximately the 18th-largest) was simply irresponsible and foolish, in spite of the notoriously fickle support of Los Angeles fans. With the Raiders moving from Los Angeles back to Oakland only a few months later, the NFL would have no franchise in Los Angeles for the first time in fifty seasons.

==== 1995: Departure ====
By 1995, the Rams franchise had withered to a mere shadow of its former self. Accusations and excuses were constantly thrown back and forth between the Rams fan base, ownership, and local politicians. Many in the fan base blamed the ownership of Georgia Frontiere for the franchise's woes, while ownership cited the out-dated stadium and withering fan support.

Frontiere finally gave up and decided to move the Rams to St. Louis. However, on March 15, 1995, the other league owners rejected Frontiere's bid to move the franchise by a 21–3–6 vote. Then-Commissioner Paul Tagliabue stated after rejecting the move, "This was one of the most complex issues we have had to approach in years. We had to balance the interest of fans in Los Angeles and in St. Louis that we appreciate very much. In my judgment, they did not meet the guidelines we have in place for such a move." The commissioner also added: "Once the bridges have been burned and people get turned off on a sports franchise, years of loyalty is not respected and it is difficult to get it back. By the same token, there are millions of fans in that area who have supported the Rams in an extraordinary way. The Rams have 50 years of history and the last 5 or so years of difficult times can be corrected."

Frontiere, however, responded with a thinly veiled threat at a lawsuit. On April 12, 1995 the owners acquiesced to her demands, wary of going through a long, protracted legal battle. Tagliabue simply stated that "The desire to have peace and not be at war was a big factor" in allowing the Rams move to go forward. In a matter of a month, the vote had gone from 21–6 opposed to 23–6 in favor. Jonathan Kraft, son of Patriots owner Robert Kraft, elaborated on the commissioner's remarks by saying that "about five or six owners didn't want to get the other owners into litigation, so they switched their votes." Only six teams remained in opposition to the Rams move from Los Angeles: the Pittsburgh Steelers, New York Giants, New York Jets, Buffalo Bills, Arizona Cardinals, and Washington Redskins. After the vote was over, Steelers owner Dan Rooney publicly stated that he opposed the move of the Los Angeles Rams because "I believe we should support the fans who have supported us for years."

=== 1995–2015: St. Louis era ===
==== Time in St. Louis ====
While in St. Louis, the Rams played their first few home games at Busch Memorial Stadium before the Trans World Dome (now known as the Dome at America's Center) was completed during the middle of the 1995 season. Aided by an offense nicknamed "The Greatest Show on Turf", a period of success occurred between 1999 and 2004 when the team qualified for the playoffs in five out of those six seasons, including a win in Super Bowl XXXIV against the Tennessee Titans, and a loss to the New England Patriots in Super Bowl XXXVI. Other than that period of success, the St. Louis Rams repeatedly suffered losing seasons.

==== Attempts to move back to Los Angeles ====
Within months of the moves of the Rams and Raiders, several NFL teams were rumored to be replacements. They included the Cleveland Browns, the Cincinnati Bengals, the Tampa Bay Buccaneers, and the Seattle Seahawks. However, the Browns moved to become the Baltimore Ravens in 1996 amid major controversy, and a new Browns team occupied a new stadium in 1999. The Bengals, Buccaneers and Seahawks, meanwhile, used L.A.'s vacancy as leverage to convince their cities to help finance new stadiums. Meanwhile, various entities proposed new stadiums in Los Angeles in an attempt to lure a team to the market.

===== Seattle Seahawks in Los Angeles =====
The closest Los Angeles had come to getting a new NFL franchise prior to 2016 was the Seattle Seahawks. In March 1996, Seahawks owner Ken Behring moved office equipment and some athletic gear to the elementary school in Anaheim that once held Rams practices, hoping to get approval for a permanent move to Southern California. He also had plans to change the team's name and colors if a move to Los Angeles was successful. Because of an owners' revolt, Behring halted the process and moved the equipment back to Seattle. Eventually, Paul Allen bought the team and kept it in Seattle by building Seahawks Stadium, now known as Lumen Field.

===== 1999 NFL expansion =====
Los Angeles again came close to regaining an NFL team in 1999, when the NFL approved a new franchise, the league's 32nd, for Los Angeles, on the condition that the city and NFL agree on a stadium site and stadium financing. Those agreements were never reached, and on October 6, 1999, the franchise was awarded to a Houston ownership group instead, which formed the Houston Texans.

===== Using Los Angeles as leverage =====
During the Rams' 21-year absence from Los Angeles, the market had been used on many different occasions as leverage to finance new stadiums or upgrade existing venues. An excellent example of this was when Indianapolis Colts owner Jim Irsay's airplane appeared at Van Nuys Airport, presumably for meetings with local officials on moving his team to Los Angeles. He eventually signed a deal to build a new venue in Indianapolis and Los Angeles continued to be without representation in the National Football League.

===== City of Champions Revitalization Initiative; Los Angeles Entertainment Center =====
On January 31, 2014, both the Los Angeles Times and the St. Louis Post-Dispatch reported that Rams owner Stan Kroenke had purchased approximately 60 acres of land adjacent to the Forum in Inglewood, California. The purchase price was rumored to have been between $90 million and $100 million. Commissioner Roger Goodell represented that Mr. Kroenke informed the league of the purchase. As an NFL owner, any purchase of land in which a potential stadium could be built must be disclosed to the league. Kroenke subsequently announced plans to build an NFL stadium on the site, in connection with the owners of the adjacent 238-acre Hollywood Park site, Stockbridge Capital Group. This development has further fueled rumors that the Rams intend to return its management and football operations to Southern California. The land was initially targeted for a Walmart Supercenter but Walmart could not get the necessary permits to build it. Kroenke is married to Ann Walton Kroenke who is a member of the Walton family and many of Kroenke's real estate deals have involved Walmart properties.

On January 5, 2015, the Los Angeles Times reported that Kroenke Sports & Entertainment and Stockbridge Capital Group were partnering up in developing a new NFL stadium on the Inglewood property owned by Kroenke. The project will include a stadium of 80,000 seats and a performance venue of 6,000 seats while reconfiguring the previously approved Hollywood Park plan for up to 890,000 square feet of retail, 780,000 square feet of office space, 2,500 new residential units, a 300-room hotel and 25 acres of public parks, playgrounds, open space and pedestrian and bicycle access. The stadium would likely be ready by 2018.

In lieu of this, St. Louis countered with a stadium plan for the north riverfront area of downtown, with the hope of keeping the Rams in the city. On February 24, 2015, the Inglewood City Council approved the stadium plan and the initiative with construction on the stadium planned to begin in December 2015. On December 21, 2015, Construction was officially underway for the stadium on the Hollywood Park site.

===== Stadium issues in St. Louis =====
The Rams and the St. Louis CVC began negotiating deals to get the Rams home stadium, the Edward Jones Dome into the top 25% of stadiums in the league (i.e., top eight teams of the 32 NFL teams in reference to luxury boxes, amenities and overall fan experience). Under the terms of the lease agreement, the St. Louis CVC was required to make modifications to the Edward Jones Dome in 2005. However, then-owner, Georgia Frontiere, waived the provision in exchange for cash that served as a penalty for the city's noncompliance. The city of St. Louis, in subsequent years, made changes to the scoreboard and increased the natural lighting by replacing panels with windows, although the overall feel remains dark. The minor renovations which totaled about $70 million did not bring the stadium within the specifications required under the lease agreement; thus, keeping the Dome in a state of uncertainty.

On February 1, 2013, a 3-person panel selected to preside over the arbitration process found that the Edward Jones Dome was not in the top 25% of all NFL venues as required under the terms of the lease agreement between the Rams and the CVC. The arbitrator further found that the estimated $700 million in proposed renovations by the Rams was not unreasonable given the terms of the lease agreement. Finally, the city of St. Louis was ordered to pay the Rams attorneys' fees which totaled a reported $2 million.

Publicly, city, county and state officials expressed no interest in providing further funding to the Edward Jones Dome in light of those entities, as well as taxpayers, continuing to owe approximately $300 million more on that facility. As such, if a resolution was not reached by the end of the 2014 NFL season and the city of St. Louis remained non-compliant in its obligations under the lease agreement, the Rams would be free to nullify their lease and go to a year-to-year lease. Months later, the Rams scheduled to play in London, which violates the Edward Jones Dome's terms of lease.

===== Filing for relocation; Houston meetings =====
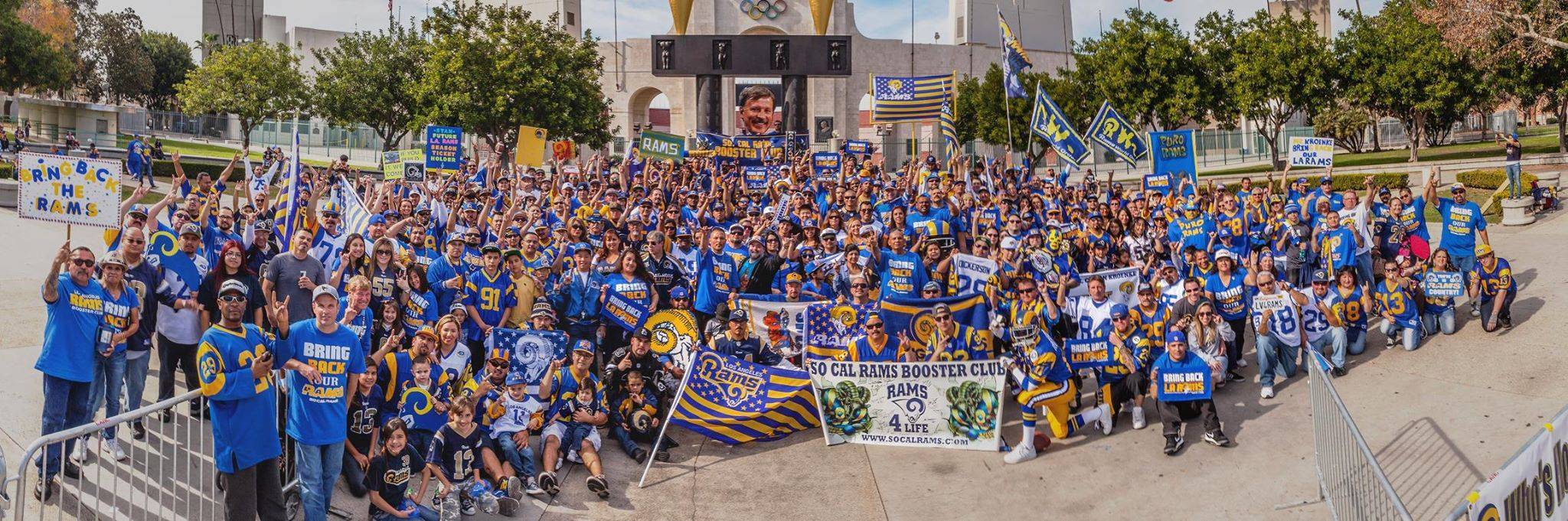
Rally held at the Los Angeles Memorial Coliseum in support of the Rams moving back to Los Angeles

On January 4, 2016, the St. Louis Rams filed for relocation to move to the Los Angeles area for the 2016 NFL season. They were among the three teams (the Rams, Oakland Raiders, and the San Diego Chargers) that filed for relocation to Los Angeles. All three franchises previously played in the Los Angeles metropolitan area. Weeks later, the NFL owners gathered in Houston for a meeting on January 11 and January 12, a meeting that decided the end of the Los Angeles race. A few days before the scheduled owners meeting, Dallas Cowboys owner Jerry Jones suggested that the Rams and Chargers should share Stan Kroenke's SoFi Stadium. This suggestion was taken as a possible option discussed in the Houston meetings. During the Los Angeles meeting, the Committee on Los Angeles Opportunities, which consists of six NFL owners, favored the Carson project over the Rams' Inglewood project. Despite this, thanks to Jerry Jones' pitch, the first round of voting during the meeting, the Rams got the greater number of votes, conquering the Carson project 21–11. However, the Rams did not meet the required 24 votes in the second round of voting the Rams Inglewood project received 20 votes while the Chargers and Raiders Carson project received only 12 votes. After hours of searching to find a compromise, it was determined that the Rams would relocate to Los Angeles and the Chargers would have the option to join them, while the Raiders would have the option to join the Rams if the Chargers elected not to move. The Chargers used their option in January 2017 becoming the Los Angeles Chargers (and returning to their original home where they played in their inaugural season of 1960).

=== 2016–present: Return to Los Angeles ===
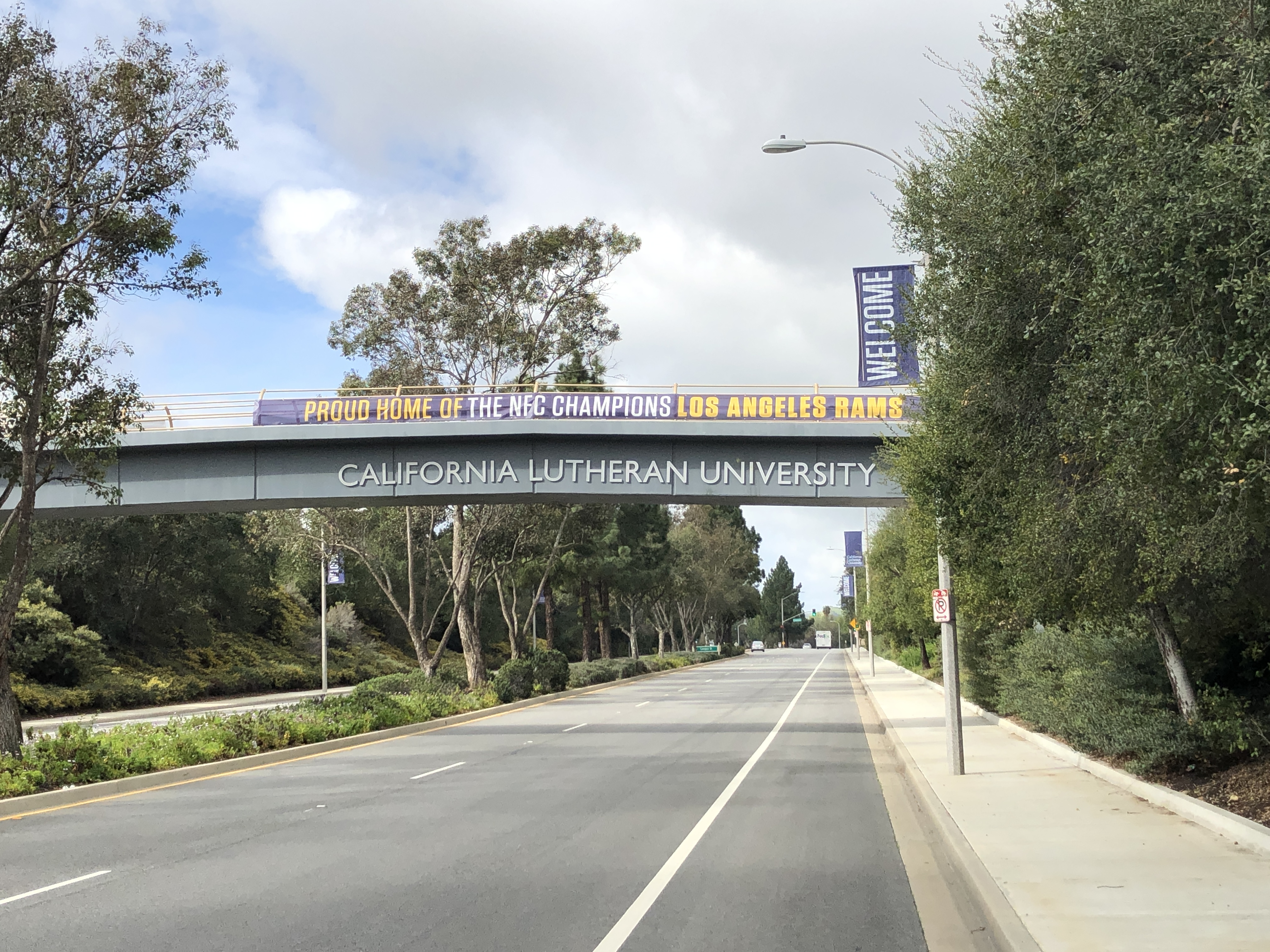
LA Rams banner at California Lutheran University in Thousand Oaks.

Upon relocating back to Los Angeles in 2016, the Rams initially played their home games at the Los Angeles Memorial Coliseum, which had been home to the team for 33 seasons (1946–1979), and is the home of the USC Trojans college football team, until SoFi Stadium was completed four years later in 2020.

During that time The Rams' return to Los Angeles was used to help expand the league's presence around the globe. In 2016, the Rams faced the New York Giants in London at Twickenham Stadium, as part of the NFL's International Series. Kevin Demoff, the team's Executive Vice President of Football Operations/Chief Operating Officer, told The Guardian that he sees L.A. as a gateway to Asia and says being in L.A. will help sell the brand, more so, than in St. Louis.

Los Angeles Rams wordmark, 2016–2019

On February 4, 2016, the Los Angeles Rams selected Oxnard, California to be the site of their minicamp, offseason team activities, and offseason program that began on April 18. In March, it was announced that the Rams would be featured on HBO's Hard Knocks. On March 30, California Lutheran University and the Rams reached an agreement that allowed the team to have regular-season training operations at CLU's campus for the next two years. The Rams paid for two practice fields, paved parking, and modular buildings constructed on the northwestern corner of the campus.

==== 2016 season: Jared Goff era begins ====
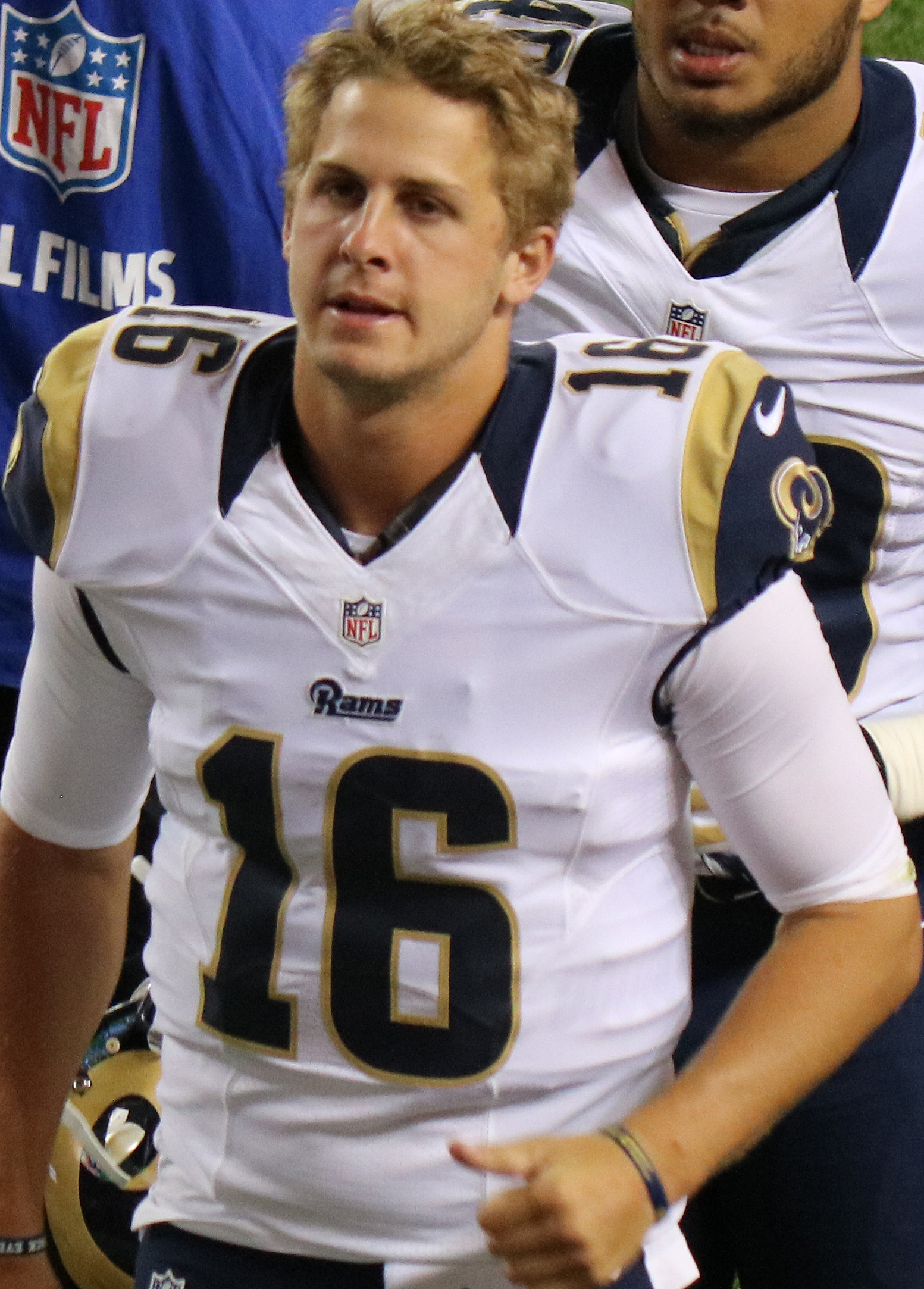
Jared Goff in his 2016 rookie season

On April 13, 2016, the Los Angeles Rams traded their 2016 first-round pick, two second-round picks, a third-round pick, and their 2017 first-round and third-round picks to the Tennessee Titans in exchange for the number one pick, alongside their fourth-round pick and a sixth-round pick. The Rams decided to wait until after Lakers great Kobe Bryant's last game before announcing the blockbuster trade.

On April 28, 2016, the Rams drafted quarterback Jared Goff from California, with the 1st overall pick in the 1st round. The team also selected tight end Tyler Higbee and wide receiver Pharoh Cooper in the 4th round with the 110th and 117th picks, tight end Temarrick Hemingway, linebacker Josh Forrest, and wide receiver Mike Thomas in the 6th round with the 190th, 193rd, and 206th picks. In June 2016, it was reported that the Rams had sold 63,000 season tickets, which was short of their goal of 70,000. Later on July 12, 2016, it was reported that they had sold 70,000 tickets, reaching their goal. In July 2016, the Rams signed a three-year agreement with UC Irvine to use the university's facilities for training camp, with an option to extend it to two more years. On July 29, 2016, the Los Angeles Times reported that the Rams would host their first training-camp practice and "Rams Family Day" on Saturday, August 6 at the Los Angeles Memorial Coliseum, which was open to the public.

The Rams played their first game in the Los Angeles area since 1994, a 22-year absence, with a preseason opener against the Dallas Cowboys at the Los Angeles Memorial Coliseum on August 13. The Rams defeated the Cowboys 28–24 in front of a crowd of 89,140, a record attendance for a pre-season game.

On September 12, 2016, the Rams played their first regular season game since returning to Los Angeles, where they lost to the San Francisco 49ers 28–0 at Levi's Stadium. On September 18, in front of over 91,000 fans at the Los Angeles Memorial Coliseum, The Rams played their first home game on September 18, 2016, defeating the Seattle Seahawks 9–3.

===== Fisher's firing =====
On December 12, 2016, the team fired head coach Jeff Fisher after starting the season with a 4−9 record. The team announced later that day that John Fassel would be taking over as interim head coach. Fassel is the son of former NFL head coach Jim Fassel and had been the Rams special teams coach since the 2012 season.

==== 2017 season: McVay's hiring and first winning season since 2003 ====
On January 12, 2017 (the same day the Chargers moved to the Los Angeles area as the team did) the Rams hired Sean McVay for the team's head coaching vacancy. McVay, then 30, became the youngest head coach in NFL history. McVay was formerly the offensive coordinator of the Redskins, working under head coach Jay Gruden. Under McVay who brought over in a conditioning and winning culture, quarterback Jared Goff had begun to come into his own as an elite quarterback under McVay and running back Todd Gurley had returned to dominance. On November 26, 2017, the Rams defeated the New Orleans Saints 26–20. The win was their eighth of the season, which secured their first non-losing year since 2006 (and first in Los Angeles since 1989). A week later, the Rams would defeat the Arizona Cardinals 32–16 to secure a winning season for the first time since the 2003 season. On December 24, 2017, the Rams defeated the Tennessee Titans 27–23 to clinch their first NFC West title since 2003 (and first in Los Angeles since 1985). Following a loss to the San Francisco 49ers, the Rams went 11-5 and won their first division title since 2003, as well as their first playoff berth since 2004.

The Rams would lose in the Wild Card game against the defending NFC champion Atlanta Falcons 26–13.

==== 2018 season: Super Bowl run ====
The 2018 off-season was highlighted with acquiring Marcus Peters from the Kansas City Chiefs, signing Ndamukong Suh in free agency, and acquiring five-time Pro Bowler Aqib Talib and Brandin Cooks via trades. While also signing Brandin Cooks, Todd Gurley, Rob Havenstein and Aaron Donald to long-term deals.

The Rams opened their 2018 season on September 10 by defeating the Oakland Raiders 33–13 on Monday Night Football, scoring 23 unanswered second half points in a game where head coach McVay took on his former mentor, Jon Gruden, who was making his return to coaching. It was the first of two Monday Night Football appearances for the Rams in the season. The Rams continued their strong start throughout the season finishing the first half of the season 8–0, their best start since 1969. The Rams were the only remaining undefeated team in the NFL in 2018 until losing on the road to the New Orleans Saints in Week 9 at the Mercedes-Benz Superdome. The Rams bounced back with three straight wins, defeating the Seattle Seahawks 36–31, and then winning a wild 54–51 shootout against the Kansas City Chiefs on Monday Night Football. Following a bye week, the Rams beat the host Detroit Lions 30–16 in Week 13 to clinch both a playoff berth and their second straight NFC West title. Los Angeles stumbled with back-to-back losses to the Chicago Bears and Philadelphia Eagles, but finished strong with victories over the Arizona Cardinals and San Francisco 49ers to clinch a first round bye. The Rams' 13–3 record tied for the best record in the league, while having the second-most wins in a single season in franchise history and were the most ever for any NFL team in Los Angeles.

The Rams defeated the Dallas Cowboys 30–22 in the divisional round to head to the NFC Championship Game for the first time since 2001. It was also the Rams' first playoff win since 2004. The Rams would meet the Saints again, but this time beating the Saints on the road 26–23 to advance to the Super Bowl for the first time since 2001 and first appearance based in Los Angeles since 1979. Their opponent in Super Bowl LIII was the New England Patriots, whom they had previously faced in Super Bowl XXXVI when they were based in St. Louis, but narrowly lost 20–17. Despite their immense talent, the Rams offense was stymied and ineffective throughout the game, being held to no touchdowns and only one field goal. They held the Patriots to a 3–3 tie after 3 quarters, but lost 13–3. The Rams joined the 1971 Miami Dolphins in Super Bowl VI to only score 3 points in the Super Bowl.

==== 2019 season: Post-Super Bowl slump and Last season at the Los Angeles Memorial Coliseum ====
The season was filled with injuries and setbacks, as Los Angeles narrowly missed the playoffs with a 9–7 record. It also marked the Rams' final year at the Coliseum.

==== 2020 season: Debut at SoFi Stadium and COVID-19 ====
The Rams and Chargers moved into the newly completed SoFi Stadium, but due to the COVID-19 pandemic, were forced to play there without spectators. The Rams also cut oft-injured running back Todd Gurley, who previously led the league in rushing three times, during the offseason. Despite being the first team to lose to the New York Jets in week 15, the Rams finished the season at 10–6, returning to the playoffs. They beat the rival Seattle Seahawks in the wild card round, with backup quarterback John Wolford starting in place of an injured Goff, though Wolford would leave the game with a neck injury. The team would lose to the Green Bay Packers the following week during the divisional round.

==== 2021 season: End of Jared Goff era, Arrival of Matthew Stafford, and Super Bowl win ====
On March 18, 2021, Los Angeles traded Jared Goff and several draft picks to the Detroit Lions in exchange for their longtime quarterback Matthew Stafford. The Rams started off strongly by winning seven out of their first eight games, but a three-game losing streak in November dropped the team to 7–4. Wide receiver Robert Woods was lost for the season, but the Rams bolstered their roster by signing free agent wide receiver Odell Beckham Jr. and trading for former Denver Broncos All-Pro linebacker Von Miller. Los Angeles won five straight games but lost at home to the San Francisco 49ers to finish the regular season at 12–5, which clinched the team's third NFC West Division title since head coach Sean McVay's arrival.

In the playoffs, the Rams routed the division rival Arizona Cardinals 34–11 in the first playoff game played at SoFi Stadium. A week later in Tampa Bay, Los Angeles built a 27–3 lead, then withstood a rally led by Tom Brady to defeat the Tampa Bay Buccaneers 30-27. The Rams returned home for the NFC Championship Game to face the 49ers, who had won six straight regular season meetings. Despite trailing by 10 points going into the fourth quarter, the Rams came back to win 20–17 to earn their second trip to the Super Bowl in four seasons. Playing at their home stadium for Super Bowl LVI as the 'away' team, the Rams again overcame a late deficit to defeat the AFC champion Cincinnati Bengals 23–20, winning the franchise's second Super Bowl championship, and first in Los Angeles. Wide receiver Cooper Kupp was named the game's Most Valuable Player.

==== 2022 season: Super Bowl hangover ====
In 2022, injuries and regression derailed the Rams' chances of repeating as Super Bowl champions. Most notably, core contributors to the 2021 Super Bowl-winning team, including Matthew Stafford, Cooper Kupp, and Aaron Donald, missed significant parts of the season with injuries. Los Angeles also experienced a historic number of offensive line injuries that forced McVay to start eleven different offensive line combinations in the first eleven games of the season, something that no team had done since the 1970 AFL-NFL merger. The team began the season by losing in blowout fashion on national television to the Super Bowl-hopeful Buffalo Bills, and the game seemingly set the tone for the 2022 Rams, who never looked like their 2021 selves during the season. Although Los Angeles managed to stay afloat with a 3-3 record through six games, the team endured a deep slump and lost their next six games en route to a 5-12 finish. The .294 win percentage was the worst ever for a defending Super Bowl champion.

==== 2023 season: Resurgence and return to the playoffs ====
Following the team's disastrous 2022 season, the Rams parted ways with several defensive contributors, as the team traded cornerback Jalen Ramsey to the Miami Dolphins, released edge rusher Leonard Floyd, and released linebacker Bobby Wagner. McVay and general manager Les Snead also stockpiled several mid-to-late round draft picks in the upcoming 2023 NFL draft.

With the aforementioned moves, many expected the Rams to enter into a rebuilding stage and struggle throughout the 2023 season. However, the Rams returned to the playoffs as a wild card team (despite struggling to a 3-6 record before the bye week) thanks to the resurgence of Stafford and strong play from rookies such as wide receiver Puka Nacua, defensive tackle Kobie Turner, and linebacker Byron Young.

In the wild card round of the 2023–24 NFL playoffs, the Rams faced off against the NFC North champion Detroit Lions, led by former Rams quarterback Jared Goff. The game was also notable for being Stafford's first game in Detroit as an opposing player (Stafford spent his first twelve seasons playing for Detroit). In a game that was dominated by storylines about the Stafford-Goff trade and dubbed as a "revenge game" for quarterbacks Stafford and Goff, the Lions emerged victorious with a narrow 24-23 win. Los Angeles was undone by scoring zero touchdowns in three red zone trips, while Detroit converted all three of its own red zone trips into touchdowns.

==== 2024 season: 17th NFC West division title ====
Before the season, legendary Rams defensive tackle Aaron Donald retired after ten seasons playing for the team. This made right tackle Rob Havenstein the last remaining current Rams player who played for the team while it was based in St. Louis.

Like the previous season, the Rams stumbled out of the gate to a dire position. Los Angeles lost four of its first five games before its Week 6 bye, with the only win during this stretch being a dramatic come-from-behind victory against the defending NFC champion and bitter rival San Francisco 49ers. Injuries to key players such as star wide receiver Puka Nacua were partially responsible for the poor start.

Also, like the previous season, the Rams went on a torrid run following the bye week. The team got healthier and won nine of its next eleven games, including key upset victories over the Minnesota Vikings and Buffalo Bills, to win the NFC West title. The team finished with a 10-7 record (an identical record to 2023), tied with the rival Seattle Seahawks, but the Rams won the division thanks to clinching the strength-of-victory tiebreaker over Seattle. The playoff berth was the franchise's sixth in head coach Sean McVay's eight seasons with Los Angeles. Also, with this result, the Rams became the first franchise in NFL history to make the playoffs in consecutive seasons when being 3 games below .500 at some point in each of those seasons.

Due to the January 2025 Southern California wildfires, the team's Wild Card game against Minnesota was moved from SoFi Stadium to State Farm Stadium in Glendale, Arizona. Nevertheless, the Rams won convincingly over the Vikings by a final score of 27–9 thanks to a suffocating defensive performance. In the NFC Divisional round against the Philadelphia Eagles on the road at Lincoln Financial Field, the Rams fought hard and staged a furious comeback attempt in the fourth quarter, but on a potential go-ahead touchdown drive, the offense stalled in the red zone and turned the ball over on downs, sealing the 28–22 win for Philadelphia. The Eagles would go on to win Super Bowl LIX against the Kansas City Chiefs.

Following the season, the organization released longtime wide receiver and Super Bowl LVI MVP Cooper Kupp.

== List of seasons ==
Season	Team	League	Conference	Division	Regular Season				Attendance		Postseason Results	Awards
Season	Team	League	Conference	Division	Finish	Wins	Losses	Ties	Rams Average	NFL Average	Postseason Results	Awards
Los Angeles Rams (1946–1994)
1946	1946	NFL		West	2nd	6	4	1	42,834 (2/10)	34,397		
1947	1947	NFL		West	4th	6	6	0	32,130 (5/10)	30,226		
1948	1948	NFL		West	3rd	6	5	1	28,258 (5/10)	26,240		
1949	1949	NFL		West	1st	8	2	2	44,043 (1/10)	24,798	Lost NFL Championship (Eagles) 14–0	
1950	1950	NFL	National		1st	9	3	0	26,341 (6/13)	27,070	Won National Conference Playoff (Bears) 24–14; Lost NFL Championship (Browns) 30–28	
1951	1951	NFL	National		1st	8	4	0	44,196 (1/12)	28,741	Won NFL Championship (2) (Browns) 24–17	
1952	1952	NFL	National		2nd	9	3	0	53,157 (1/12)	31,278	Lost National Conference Playoff (Lions) 31–21	Hamp Pool (COY)
1953	1953	NFL	Western		3rd	8	3	1	54,744 (1/12)	32,895		
1954	1954	NFL	Western		4th	6	5	1	54,734 (1/12)	33,769		
1955	1955	NFL	Western		1st	8	3	1	66,159 (1/12)	37,796	Lost NFL Championship (Browns) 38–14	
1956	1956	NFL	Western		T-5th	4	8	0	61,190 (1/12)	38,293		
1957	1957	NFL	Western		4th	6	6	0	74,296 (1/12)	42,160		
1958	1958	NFL	Western		T-2nd	8	4	0	83,681 (1/12)	44,690		
1959	1959	NFL	Western		6th	2	10	0	74,069 (1/12)	46,134		
1960	1960	NFL	Western		6th	4	7	1	61,724 (1/21)	32,150		
1961	1961	NFL	Western		6th	4	10	0	47,992 (7/22)	33,874		
1962	1962	NFL	Western		7th	1	12	1	41,572 (9/22)	35,355		
1963	1963	NFL	Western		6th	5	9	0	42,302 (9/22)	36,610		
1964	1964	NFL	Western		5th	5	7	2	55,764 (5/22)	40,636		
1965	1965	NFL	Western		7th	4	10	0	40,333 (13/22)	43,489		
1966	1966	NFL	Western		3rd	8	6	0	49,776 (10/24)	45,732		
1967	1967	NFL	Western	Coastal	1st	11	1	2	60,000 (6/25)	48,606	Lost Conference Playoff Game (Packers) 28–7	George Allen (COY); Deacon Jones (DPOY)
1968	1968	NFL	Western	Coastal	2nd	10	3	1	65,127 (4/26)	48,777		Deacon Jones (DPOY)
1969	1969	NFL	Western	Coastal	1st	11	3	0	71,242 (3/26)	51,053	Lost Conference Playoff Game (Vikings) 23–20	Roman Gabriel (MVP)/(Rams MVP)
1970	1970	NFL	NFC	West	2nd	9	4	1	71,242 (2/26)	54,375		Merlin Olsen (Rams MVP)
1971	1971	NFL	NFC	West	2nd	8	5	1	72,453 (3/26)	56,935		Isiah Robertson (DROY); Marlin McKeever (Rams MVP)
1972	1972	NFL	NFC	West	3rd	6	7	1	72,461 (4/26)	58,416		Merlin Olsen (Rams MVP)
1973	1973	NFL	NFC	West	1st	12	2	0	74,168 (2/26)	55,339	Lost Divisional Playoffs (Cowboys) 27–16	Chuck Knox (COY); John Hadl (NFC)/(Rams MVP)
1974	1974	NFL	NFC	West	1st	10	4	0	75,492 (2/26)	52,098	Won Divisional Playoffs (Redskins) 19–10; Lost Conference Championship (Vikings) 14–10	Lawrence McCutcheon (Rams MVP)
1975	1975	NFL	NFC	West	1st	12	2	0	65,284 (4/26)	52,754	Won Divisional Playoffs (Cardinals) 35–23; Lost Conference Championship (Cowboys) 37–7	Jack Youngblood (DPOY)/(Rams MVP)
1976	1976	NFL	NFC	West	1st	10	3	1	63,141 (4/26)	53,983	Won Divisional Playoffs (Cowboys) 14–12; Lost Conference Championship (Vikings) 24–13	Jack Youngblood (Rams MVP)
1977	1977	NFL	NFC	West	1st	10	4	0	53,585 (10/28)	52,711	Lost Divisional Playoffs (Vikings) 14–7	Lawrence McCutcheon (Rams MVP)
1978	1978	NFL	NFC	West	1st	12	4	0	53,388 (14/28)	53,983	Won Divisional Playoffs (Vikings) 34–10; Lost Conference Championship (Cowboys) 28–0	Jim Youngblood (Rams MVP)
1979	1979	NFL	NFC	West	1st	9	7	0	52,970 (17/28)	55,960	Won Divisional Playoffs (Cowboys) 21–19; Won Conference Championship (Buccaneers) 9–0; Lost Super Bowl XIV (Steelers) 31–19	Jack Youngblood (Rams MVP); Kent Hill (Rams ROY)
1980	1980	NFL	NFC	West	2nd	11	5	0	62,550 (8/28)	56,667	Lost Wild Card Playoffs (Cowboys) 34–13	Vince Ferragamo (Rams MVP); Johnnie Johnson (Rams ROY)
1981	1981	NFL	NFC	West	3rd	6	10	0	60,503 (11/28)	57,665		Nolan Cromwell (Rams MVP); Jairo Penaranda (Rams ROY)
1982	1982	NFL	NFC		14th	2	7	0	51,690 (16/28)	52,527		Vince Ferragamo (Rams MVP); Barry Redden (Rams ROY)
1983	1983	NFL	NFC	West	2nd	9	7	0	52,780 (15/28)	54,364	Won Wild Card Playoffs (Cowboys) 24–17; Lost Divisional Playoffs (Redskins) 51–7	Eric Dickerson (OROY)/NFC/Rams MVP/Rams ROY
1984	1984	NFL	NFC	West	2nd	10	6	0	54,455 (17/28)	55,528	Lost Wild Card Playoffs (Giants) 16–13	Eric Dickerson (NFC)/(Rams MVP); Ron Brown (Rams ROY)
1985	1985	NFL	NFC	West	1st	11	5	0	56,242 (15/28)	55,408	Won Divisional Playoffs (Cowboys) 20–0; Lost Conference Championship (Bears) 24–0	LeRoy Irvin (Rams MVP); Dale Hatcher (Rams ROY)
1986	1986	NFL	NFC	West	2nd	10	6	0	59,285 (10/28)	56,872	Lost Wild Card Playoffs (Redskins) 19–7	Eric Dickerson (OPOY)(NFC)/(Rams MVP); Jim Everett (Rams ROY)
1987	1987	NFL	NFC	West	3rd	6	9	0	47,356 (18/28)	48,639		Charles White (Rams MVP); Cliff Hicks (Rams ROY)
1988	1988	NFL	NFC	West	2nd	10	6	0	54,469 (17/28)	56,727	Lost Wild Card Playoffs (Vikings) 28–17	Henry Ellard (Rams MVP); Robert Delpino (Rams ROY)
1989	1989	NFL	NFC	West	2nd	11	5	0	58,846 (11/28)	57,257	Won Wild Card Playoffs (Eagles) 21–7; Won Divisional Playoffs (Giants) 19–13; Lost Conference Championship (49ers) 30–3	Jim Everett (Rams MVP); Darryl Henley (Rams ROY)
1990	1990	NFL	NFC	West	3rd	5	11	0	59,920 (12/28)	59,665		Buford McGee (Rams MVP); Bern Brostek (Rams ROY)
1991	1991	NFL	NFC	West	4th	3	13	0	51,586 (22/28)	58,926		Robert Delpino (Rams MVP); Todd Lyght (Rams ROY)
1992	1992	NFL	NFC	West	4th	6	10	0	47,811 (25/28)	58,734		Jackie Slater (Rams MVP); Sean Gilbert(Rams ROY)
1993	1993	NFL	NFC	West	4th	5	11	0	45,401 (25/28)	59,352		Jerome Bettis (OROY)(Rams MVP)/(Rams ROY)
1994	1994	NFL	NFC	West	4th	4	12	0	43,312 (28/28)	60,107		Shane Conlan (Rams MVP); Isaac Bruce (Rams ROY)
St. Louis Rams (1995–2015)
Los Angeles Rams (2016–present)
2016	2016	NFL	NFC	West	3rd	4	12	0	84,457 (2/32)			
2017	2017	NFL	NFC	West	1st	11	5	0			Lost Wild Card Playoffs (Falcons) 26-13	Sean McVay (COY); Todd Gurley (OPOY); Aaron Donald (DPOY)
2018	2018	NFL	NFC	West	1st	13	3	0			Won Divisional Playoffs (Cowboys) 30–22; Won NFC Championship (Saints) 26–23 (OT); Lost Super Bowl LIII (Patriots) 3–13	Aaron Donald (DPOY)
2019	2019	NFL	NFC	West	3rd	9	7	0				
2020	2020	NFL	NFC	West	2nd	10	6	0			Won Wild Card Playoffs (Seahawks) 30–20; Lost Divisional Playoffs (Packers) 18-32	Aaron Donald (DPOY)
2021	2021	NFL	NFC	West	1st	12	5	0			Won Wild Card Playoffs (Cardinals) 34–11; Won Divisional Playoffs (Buccaneers) 30–27; Won NFC Championship (49ers) 20–17; Won Super Bowl LVI (Bengals) 23–20	Cooper Kupp (SB MVP, OPOY); Andrew Whitworth (WPMOY)
2022	2022	NFL	NFC	West	3rd	5	12	0				
2023	2023	NFL	NFC	West	2nd	10	7	0			Lost Wild Card Playoffs (at Lions) 23–24	
2024	2024	NFL	NFC	West	1st	10	7	0			Won Wild Card Playoffs (Vikings) 27–9; Lost Divisional Playoffs (Eagles) 22-28	Jared Verse (DROTY)
Total 2 NFL Titles (1951 and 2021) 6 Conference Titles 13 Division Titles 26 Playoff Appearances						438	354	18	(regular season)			
Total 2 NFL Titles (1951 and 2021) 6 Conference Titles 13 Division Titles 26 Playoff Appearances						19	23	0	(playoffs)			
Total 2 NFL Titles (1951 and 2021) 6 Conference Titles 13 Division Titles 26 Playoff Appearances						457	377	18	(regular season and playoffs)			

* Between 1946 and 1994, the Los Angeles Rams Played a total of 679 Regular Season Games and 32 Playoff Games (711 Games)

* Between 1946 and 1994, the Los Angeles Rams had a total record of 364–297 (Regular), 12–20 (Postseason), and 376–317 (Total)

== Pro Football Hall of Famers ==
Former Los Angeles Rams in the Pro Football Hall of Fame include Jerome Bettis (36), Joe Namath (12), Ollie Matson (33), Andy Robustelli (84), Dick "Night Train" Lane (81), and general manager Tex Schramm. GM and later NFL Commissioner Pete Rozelle and coach Sid Gillman are also members of the Hall of Fame, but were elected on the basis of their performances with other teams or (in the case of Rozelle) NFL administration.

Los Angeles Rams Hall of Famers
No.	Player	Class	Position(s)	Tenure
—	George Allen	2002	Coach	1966–1970
36	Jerome Bettis	2015	RB	1993–1994
76	Bob Brown	2004	OT	1969–1970
29	Eric Dickerson	1999	RB	1983–1987
55	Tom Fears	1970	End	1948–1956
40	Elroy "Crazy Legs" Hirsch	1968	RB, WR	1949–1957
75	Deacon Jones	1980	DE	1961–1971
65	Tom Mack	1999	G	1966–1978
74	Merlin Olsen	1982	DT	1962–1976
–	Dan Reeves	1967	Owner	1946–1971
67, 48	Les Richter	2011	LB, K	1954–1962
78	Jackie Slater	2001	OT	1976–1994
25	Norm Van Brocklin	1971	QB, P	1949–1957
7	Bob Waterfield	1965	QB, DB, K, P	1946–1952
85	Jack Youngblood	2001	DE	1971–1984
91	Kevin Greene	2016	LB, DE	1985–1992

=== Retired numbers ===
Numbers that have been retired by the Rams. This list includes players who have played most of their career in Los Angeles Only.

Los Angeles Rams retired numbers
No.	Player	Position	Tenure
7	Bob Waterfield	QB	1945–1952
29	Eric Dickerson	RB	1983–1987
74	Merlin Olsen	DT	1962–1976
75	Deacon Jones	DE	1961–1971
78	Jackie Slater	OT	1976–1995
85	Jack Youngblood	DE	1971–1984

- Bob Waterfield played his first season in Cleveland
- Jackie Slater played his last season in St. Louis

== Radio and television ==
The Rams were the first NFL team to televise their home games; in a sponsorship arrangement with Admiral television, all home games of the 1950 NFL season were shown locally. The Rams also televised games in the early 1950s. The 1951 NFL Championship Game was the first championship game televised coast-to-coast (via the DuMont Network). During the team's years in Los Angeles all games were broadcast on KMPC radio (710 AM); play-by-play announcers were Bob Kelley (who accompanied the team from Cleveland and worked until his death in 1966), Dick Enberg (1966–1977), Al Wisk (1978–1979), Bob Starr (1980–1989, 1993), Eddie Doucette (1990), Paul Olden (1991–1992), and Steve Physioc (1994). Analysts included Gil Stratton, Steve Bailey, Dave Niehaus (1968–1972), Don Drysdale (1973–1976), Dick Bass (1977–1986), Jack Youngblood (1987–1991), Jack Snow (1992–1994), and Deacon Jones (1994). Today, former Tampa Bay Buccaneers reporter and Pac-12 Network broadcaster J.B. Long is the current play-by-play announcer with former running back Maurice Jones-Drew as the side analyst.

== In popular culture ==
- In the 1978 film Heaven Can Wait, Joe Pendleton (Warren Beatty), a fictional quarterback for the Los Angeles Rams, is looking forward to leading his team to the Super Bowl.

== See also ==
- List of Los Angeles Rams seasons
- History of the National Football League in Los Angeles
- History of the Los Angeles Chargers
