= Preston Dennard =

American football player (born 1955)

No. 88, 83
- Position: Wide receiver

Personal information
- Born: November 28, 1955 (age 70); Cordele, Georgia, U.S.
- Listed height: 6 ft 1 in (1.85 m)
- Listed weight: 185 lb (84 kg)

Career information
- High school: Marcos de Niza (AZ)
- College: New Mexico
- NFL draft: 1978: undrafted

Career history
- Los Angeles Rams (1978–1983); Buffalo Bills (1984); Green Bay Packers (1985)

Career NFL statistics
- Receptions: 232
- Receiving yards: 3,665
- Receiving touchdowns: 30
- Stats at Pro Football Reference

Preston Jackson Dennard (/dɛˈnɑːrd/ deh-NARD; born November 28, 1955) is an American former professional football player who was a wide receiver in the National Football League (NFL) for the Los Angeles Rams, Buffalo Bills and Green Bay Packers. He played college football for the New Mexico Lobos.

== College career ==
A stellar three-sport athlete in high school in Tempe, Ariz., Dennard exploded onto the college scene at the University of New Mexico in 1974. He had been recruited out of Marcos de Niza high school. He became the first Lobo freshman to garner first team All-WAC honors. In 1975, he beat out a Freshman receiver from Arizona State named John Washington, who would later change his last name to his father's name. John Jefferson. Dennard finished third in the nation in receiving. He was first team all-league in 1976. By his senior year, Dennard held every receiving record at UNM. He caught 142 passes for 2,257 yards, numbers that still rank high in the Lobo record book.

1974 was the first year that Dennard saw game action. That season he caught 15 passes for 171 yards as New Mexico finished 4-6-1 under head coach Bill Mondt. The following season, the team improved to 6-5 and the inconsistency at quarterback had been resolved. Dennard had his best season, stats wise, as he hauled in 59 passes for 962 yards and 6 touchdowns. while Dennard emerged on the field, New Mexico struggled to win, losing seven games in both Dennard's junior and senior years.

== Professional career ==
Dennard then spent nine seasons in the NFL, playing for Los Angeles, Buffalo, and Green Bay. His career numbers were 232 receptions for 3,665 yards and 30 touchdowns. He was a starter for the Rams in the 1980 Super Bowl and was twice nominated for the NFL Man of the Year award.

Dennard made the Rams as undrafted free agent in 1978. Appearing mostly as a special teams player, Dennard did catch three passes for 35 yards for a Rams team that finished 12–4, but was crushed 28–0 in the conference championship by the Dallas Cowboys. Dennard started 11 games in 1979, playing alongside Willie Miller and Billy Waddy. That season Dennard caught 32 passes for 766 yards and four touchdowns. He played in the playoffs, catching 2 passes for 32 yards in the Super Bowl loss to the Pittsburgh Steelers. It would be the only time that Dennard played in the Super Bowl. Dennard was emerging as a favorite target for Rams quarterback Vince Ferragamo during this time. One of the most memorable plays occurred during the 1980 season, when Ferragamo found Dennard for a 34-yard touchdown strike to put the Rams up 28–0 over the Cowboys a game the Rams would go on to win 38–14. However, the Cowboys avenged the loss weeks later in a wild card game, beating the Rams 34–13.

The Rams' fortunes changed when Ferragamo opted for the Canadian Football League. The Rams turned to Pat Haden and an aging Dan Pastorini at quarterback and fell to 6–10. Despite the uncertainty at quarterback, Dennard still posted impressive numbers, catching 49 passes for 821 yards and four touchdowns. The 1982 season, marred by a players strike, was a forgettable one as the Rams fell to 2–7. Dennard rebounded the next season under new head coach John Robinson. Ferragamo returned from the CFL and the Rams returned to the NFC championship. However, the lost to the Washington Redskins 51–7 in the playoffs, Dennard accounting for the Rams' only score. It was to be Dennard's last meaningful game in a Rams uniform. Shortly before the 1984 season was to begin, the Rams traded Dennard to the Buffalo Bills for safety Chris Williams. The Bills were on tough times, with starting quarterback Joe Ferguson in the twilight of his career and backed up by Joe Dufek and Matt Kofler. The Bills stumbled to an 0–11 record before they upset the Dallas Cowboys 14–3. Dennard did not catch a pass that game, but finished the season with 7 touchdown receptions. The next season, Dennard signed with the Green Bay Packers. Alongside receivers James Lofton and Phillip Epps, Dennard was mostly a third receiver, but still managed to haul in 13 passes for 182 yards and two touchdowns. He caught a touchdown pass from Jim Zorn in the Packers 38–14 win over the New Orleans Saints, and the final touchdown pass of his career, again from Zorn, in the Packers 34–24 loss to the Miami Dolphins.

== NFL career statistics ==
Legend
**Bold**	Career high

=== Regular season ===
Year	Team	Games		Receiving				
Year	Team	GP	GS	Rec	Yds	Avg	Lng	TD
1978	RAM	11	0	3	35	11.7	15	0
1979	RAM	15	11	43	766	**17.8**	50	4
1980	RAM	**16**	**16**	36	596	16.6	44	6
1981	RAM	15	15	**49**	**821**	16.8	64	4
1982	RAM	9	9	25	383	15.3	39	2
1983	RAM	14	13	33	465	14.1	61	5
1984	BUF	**16**	13	30	417	13.9	**68**	**7**
1985	GNB	**16**	0	13	182	14.0	34	2
		112	77	232	3,665	15.8	68	30

=== Playoffs ===
Year	Team	Games		Receiving				
Year	Team	GP	GS	Rec	Yds	Avg	Lng	TD
1978	RAM	2	0	0	0	0.0	0	0
1979	RAM	**3**	**3**	**6**	103	17.2	**35**	0
1980	RAM	1	1	**6**	**117**	**19.5**	32	1
1983	RAM	2	2	**6**	94	15.7	32	**2**
		8	6	18	314	17.4	35	3

== Personal life ==
After football, Dennard has engaged in private enterprises. He attended and graduated from the Columbia School of Broadcasting and has managed his own public speaking career. He coached at Cal State Fullerton and UNM for a short time, then went to work as a broadcaster.

Dennard has volunteered for countless charities and served on a variety of boards. He is known throughout the Albuquerque community not only for his sports celebrity but also for his generous contributions to youth leadership programs, sports camps and clinics, celebrity tournaments, and drug prevention. In 2018, the Rams honored their past by honoring Dennard during a day of legends before a preseason game against the Oakland Raiders.
