= Cody Jones =

American football player (born 1951)

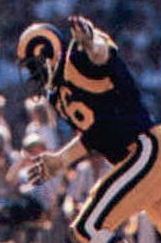
- Jones playing for the Rams in 1980

No. 76
- Positions: Defensive tackle, defensive end

Personal information
- Born: May 3, 1951 (age 75); San Francisco, California, U.S.
- Listed height: 6 ft 5 in (1.96 m)
- Listed weight: 243 lb (110 kg)

Career information
- High school: Mission (San Francisco)
- College: Trinidad, San Jose State
- NFL draft: 1973: 5th round, 115th overall pick

Career history
- Los Angeles Rams (1973)*; Los Angeles Rams (1974–1982); San Francisco 49ers (1983)*
- * Offseason or practice squad member only

Awards and highlights
- Pro Bowl (1978); First-team 1972 All-PCAA; Second-team 1971 All-PCAA

Career NFL statistics
- Sacks: 25
- Fumble recoveries: 2
- Stats at Pro Football Reference

Cody Jones (born May 3, 1951) is an American former professional football player who was a defensive tackle in the National Football League (NFL). He played college football for the San Jose State Spartans and spent his professional career with the Los Angeles Rams from 1974 to 1982.

== Early life ==
Jones was born in San Francisco, California. He attended Mission High School, where he was a three-sport athlete in football, basketball, and another sport. In football, he earned second-team All-City honors as a tackle and defensive end during his junior year, and first-team All-City as a defensive end (with second-team at tackle) as a senior. In basketball, he received second-team All-City recognition as a center during his senior year.

== College career ==
Unable to secure a major college scholarship, Jones attended Trinidad State Junior College in Trinidad, Colorado, where he played both football and basketball. As a freshman, he earned All-Conference honors as a defensive end. He started at blocking back in a single-wing offense during both his freshman and sophomore seasons, despite his 6 ft 5 in (1.96 m), 240-pound (110 kg) frame, and even caught a touchdown pass. Jones transferred to San Jose State University for his final two seasons. He started at defensive tackle, earning second-team All-Pacific Coast Athletic Association (PCAA) honors as a junior in 1971 and first-team recognition as a senior in 1972.

== Professional career ==
=== Los Angeles Rams ===
The Los Angeles Rams selected Jones in the fifth round (131st overall) of the 1973 NFL draft. As a rookie, he spent the season on the team's taxi squad without playing, as no defensive linemen were injured. In 1974, Jones backed up at defensive tackle and end, making his first start late in the year for right tackle Larry Brooks and earning positive reviews. The 1975 season brought injuries to the Rams' star-laden line of Jack Youngblood, Fred Dryer, Merlin Olsen, and Brooks. Reserve Mike Fanning missed time with a preseason ankle injury, and two tackles suffered season-ending knee issues against the San Francisco 49ers. Jones started the final six games at right tackle, recording 4.5 sacks and 23 tackles despite weighing about 245 pounds (111 kg). The Rams added Al Cowlings for end depth, with Fanning as tackle reserve. Jones had limited snaps in 1976—mostly in blowouts or end relief—as Fanning (four sacks) prepared to succeed the retiring Olsen.

In 1977, under new coach Ray Malavasi, Jones won the starting left tackle job over the injured and underperforming Fanning, holding it for four years amid annual competition. Praised for reliability and run defense over Fanning's inconsistencies, Jones tallied 63 tackles (six for loss) and 3.5 sacks, including a standout effort versus the Tampa Bay Buccaneers.

Jones broke out in 1978, fending off Fanning's preseason push and a brief relocation idea from interim coach George Allen. In a televised win over the Dallas Cowboys, he notched 10 tackles, a sack, and a pass deflection, prompting broadcasters Pat Summerall and Tom Brookshier to coin "Hold your bones, here comes Cody Jones" (echoing GM Don Klosterman's 1975 nickname). He added nine tackles and 2.5 sacks against the Buccaneers, finishing with 78 tackles, 7.5 sacks (team second), three forced fumbles, and six tackles for loss. Named first alternate to the 1978 Pro Bowl, he replaced the injured Brooks.

A ruptured Achilles tendon sidelined Jones for all of 1979 after early-season pass-rush experiments; Fanning started with seven sacks en route to Super Bowl XIV, a loss to the Pittsburgh Steelers. In 1980, Jones reclaimed left tackle duties (using a shoe lift for leg discrepancy) in a rotation with Fanning and Brooks. Fanning shone in pass-rush sub-packages (10 sacks), while Jones started all 16 games for 33 tackles, four sacks, four passes defensed, and a forced fumble.

The Rams shifted Jones to right end in 1981, where he outplayed veteran Fred Dryer (leading to Dryer's contentious release and lawsuit). Rookie and undrafted depth faltered from injuries. With Brooks reinjured midseason, the Rams moved Reggie Doss inside instead. Jones posted 43 tackles, 5.5 sacks, and five passes defensed.

Film review prompted Jones's 1982 return to tackle amid Brooks's knee woes; Doss shifted to end opposite Youngblood. In the strike-shortened year, Jones started nine games for no sacks and five passes defensed. The 2–7 Rams overhauled their defense, firing Malavasi.

=== San Francisco 49ers and retirement ===
Prior to the 1983 season, the Rams traded Jones and Wendell Tyler to the San Francisco 49ers for two top draft choices. Jones, a San Francisco native, was among the 49ers' final training camp cuts. Jones then retired at age 32, concluding a nine-year career with 255 tackles, 25 sacks, and eight forced fumbles (official sack totals began being recorded league-wide in 1982).
