= Don Klosterman (American football) =

American football player and executive (1930–2000)

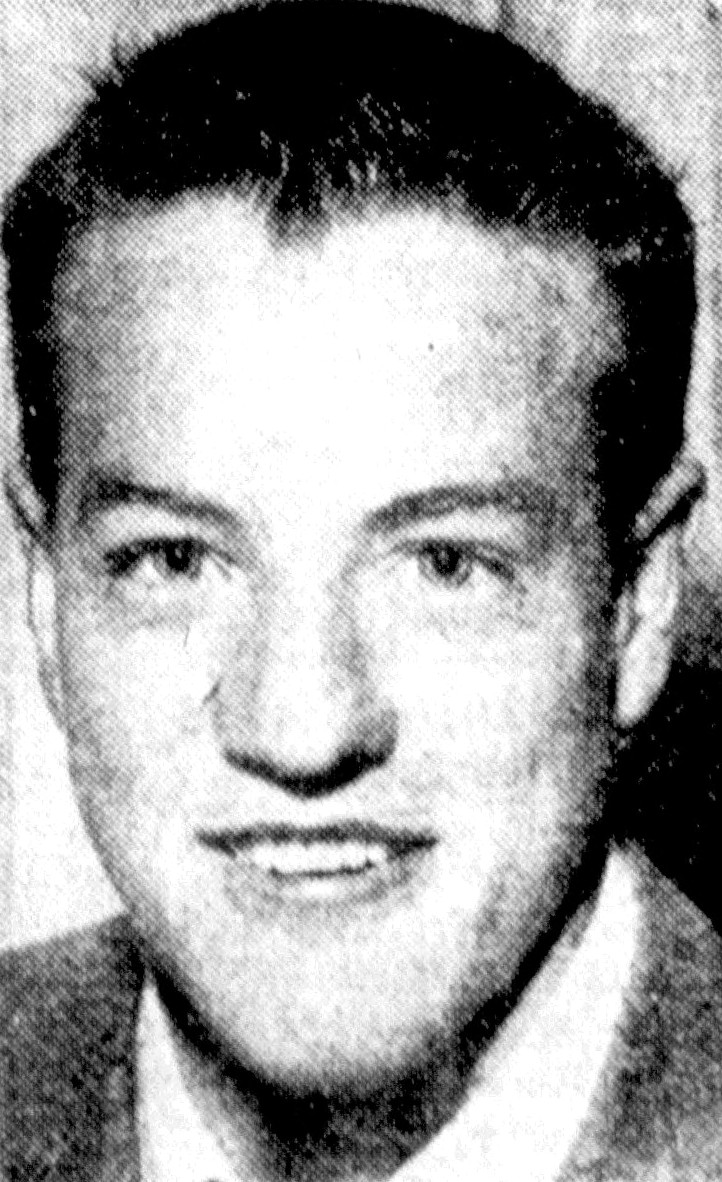
- Klosterman, c. 1950

No. 10, 98
- Positions: Quarterback, placekicker

Personal information
- Born: January 18, 1930; Le Mars, Iowa, U.S.
- Died: June 7, 2000 (aged 70); Los Angeles, California, U.S.
- Listed height: 5 ft 10 in (1.78 m)
- Listed weight: 180 lb (82 kg)

Career information
- High school: Compton (Compton, California)
- College: Loyola (CA)
- NFL draft: 1952: 3rd round, 26th overall pick

Career history

Playing
- Cleveland Browns (1952)*; Dallas Texans (1952); Los Angeles Rams (1952); Calgary Stampeders (1955–1956)
- * Offseason or practice squad member only

Operations
- Houston Oilers (1966–1969) General manager; Baltimore Colts (1970–1971) General manager; Los Angeles Rams (1972–1982) General manager and executive vice president; Los Angeles Express (1983–1985) General manager

Awards and highlights
- As a player: NCAA passing yards leader (1951); Second-team All-PCC (1951); As an executive: Super Bowl champion (V)

Career NFL statistics
- Passing attempts: 10
- Passing completions: 3
- Completion percentage: 30.0%
- TD–INT: 0–3
- Passing yards: 47
- Passer rating: 7.1
- Stats at Pro Football Reference
- Executive profile at Pro Football Reference

Donald Clement Klosterman (January 18, 1930 – June 7, 2000) was an American professional football player and executive. Klosterman was known for building teams in three different leagues after his career as a professional quarterback was cut short by a serious accident.

As an executive in the 1960s, Klosterman helped the American Football League (AFL, 1960–1969) gain traction with the National Football League (NFL) during the bidding wars that led the older league to seek a merger with the AFL. In the 1970s, he was a successful general manager for the NFL's Baltimore Colts and Los Angeles Rams. In the 1980s he signed All-American quarterback Steve Young to a record contract for the Los Angeles Express of the United States Football League (USFL).

== Early life and playing career ==
Klosterman was born of German American heritage in Le Mars, Iowa, the 12th of 15 children. As a youth, he moved to Compton, California with his family. In 1951, Klosterman was college football's leading passer while playing for Loyola University of Los Angeles, now Loyola Marymount University. In 1986, he was inducted into the University's Athletic Hall of Fame.

Drafted by the Cleveland Browns in the third round of the 1952 NFL draft, Klosterman found himself behind future Hall of Famer Otto Graham and was traded to the Los Angeles Rams, only to back up two more future Hall of Famers Norm Van Brocklin and Bob Waterfield. He later turned to Canadian football, playing quarterback for the Calgary Stampeders until his career was cut short by a skiing accident.

Klosterman was severely injured on a ski slope at Banff, Alberta, on Saint Patrick's Day in 1957. He tried to avoid another skier and damaged his spinal cord when he hit a tree. He had eight surgeries and was told he would never walk again, but he regained partial feeling and with the aid of a cane and walked again within a year.

== Football executive career ==
In 1960, Frank Leahy, the former head football coach at the University of Notre Dame, was the general manager of the AFL's Los Angeles Chargers. He asked Klosterman to help him recruit players. Klosterman joined the team and helped land future Hall of Famer Lance Alworth, along with Ernie Ladd, Ron Mix, John Hadl and Jack Kemp. In 1962, he moved on to the AFL's Dallas Texans, and with them and their successors, the Kansas City Chiefs, he helped sign Hall of Famers Bobby Bell and Buck Buchanan, Pete Beathard, Mike Garrett and Otis Taylor, most of them important players in the Chiefs' win over the Minnesota Vikings in the fourth AFL-NFL World Championship Game.

=== Houston Oilers (1966–1969) ===
Klosterman guided the AFL's Houston Oilers to two playoff berths in his four years as their general manager (1966–1969). While in his office on November 26, 1968, he was confronted by pistol-wielding recently released wide receiver Charles Lockhart, who felt he was owed $13,000 by the Oilers. Scout Tom Williams succeeded in wrestling the gun away. Three months later Lockhart was sentenced to 90 days in jail for carrying a pistol. Klosterman declined to charge Lockhart with threatening his life.

=== Baltimore Colts (1970–1971) ===
After his four‐year contract with the Oilers expired, Klosterman was hired on January 6, 1970, as general manager of the NFL Baltimore Colts, succeeding Harry Hulmes, who was demoted to an assistant position. The primary reason for the appointment was Klosterman's familiarity with the American Football League, the nucleus of the American Football Conference which the Colts were entering beginning with the 1970 NFL season. The Colts won Super Bowl V after his first season as GM.

=== Los Angeles Rams (1972–1982) ===
Klosterman was part of the transition to the Los Angeles Rams after Carroll Rosenbloom swapped franchises with Robert Irsay on July 13, 1972. Described as "one of football's smoothest talkers and shrewdest dealmakers" by Diane K. Shah of The New York Times, he had also annually stockpiled excess draft choices that gave Los Angeles excellent trading leverage, according to Paul Attner of The Washington Post. Four months after Georgia Rosenbloom inherited a 70-percent share in the ballclub upon the April 2, 1979 death of her husband, he replaced the new majority owner's stepson Steve as executive vice president on August 16. The decision was the result of a power struggle between Klosterman, who was aligned with Georgia, and Steve, who had reassigned most of the general manager's responsibilities to director of player personnel Dick Steinberg. The relationship between Klosterman and the owner eventually deteriorated to the point that he was relegated to the figurehead role of assistant to the president-consultant and exiled from the team's facilities and games in his last two years with the Rams in 1982 and 1983. He had a personality conflict with Dominic Frontiere, Georgia's new husband at the time. When the Rams were negotiating with Fred Dryer on his contract options in the spring of 1981, Klosterman claimed he explained the ramifications of the Rams picking up Dryer's option that would guarantee his $250,000 salary but in the summer of that year, Dryer was placed on waivers by head coach Ray Malavasi, and Klosterman claimed the team tried to feign ignorance of the contract details; Dryer filed a breach of contract lawsuit against the Rams. In total, the Rams went 106–63–2 from the time that Klosterman was GM of the team with eight playoff appearances.

=== Los Angeles Express (1983–1985) ===
Following the end of the Rams’ 1983 season Klosterman was named general manager of the Los Angeles Express of the United States Football League (USFL) that December. His most notable transaction with the Express was signing Steve Young to a record-setting four-year contract worth in excess of $40 million on March 5, 1984. He was dismissed on July 4, 1985, in a cost-cutting measure by the USFL, which had been operating the franchise after previous owner J. William Oldenburg was forced to relinquish the team because of financial and legal issues in February of that year. He filed a breach of contract lawsuit against the Express and the USFL in California Superior Court three months later on October 8, seeking $5 million in punitive damages and $737,500 in unpaid salary and severance pay.

In 1995, after the Los Angeles Rams went to St. Louis and the Los Angeles Raiders returned to Oakland, Klosterman joined with former San Francisco 49ers coach, Bill Walsh, in an unsuccessful effort to obtain a new NFL franchise for Los Angeles.

== Personal life ==
In the spring of 2000, Klosterman had major bypass and valve heart surgery. Six weeks after this surgery, Klosterman suffered a heart attack on June 4 in West Hollywood. He was taken to Cedars-Sinai Medical Center in Los Angeles but never regained consciousness and died on June 7. He was survived by his two adopted children, Kurt and Katie. Described by The Los Angeles Times as a "sports institution", his funeral service was held at Sacred Heart Chapel on the Loyola campus and was attended by over 1,500 people of varying stature from Senator Ted Kennedy (a family friend that had his niece given away by Klosterman at her wedding) to several NFL dignitaries.

== See also ==
- List of NCAA major college football yearly passing leaders
