= George Farmer (wide receiver, born 1958) =

American football player (born 1958)

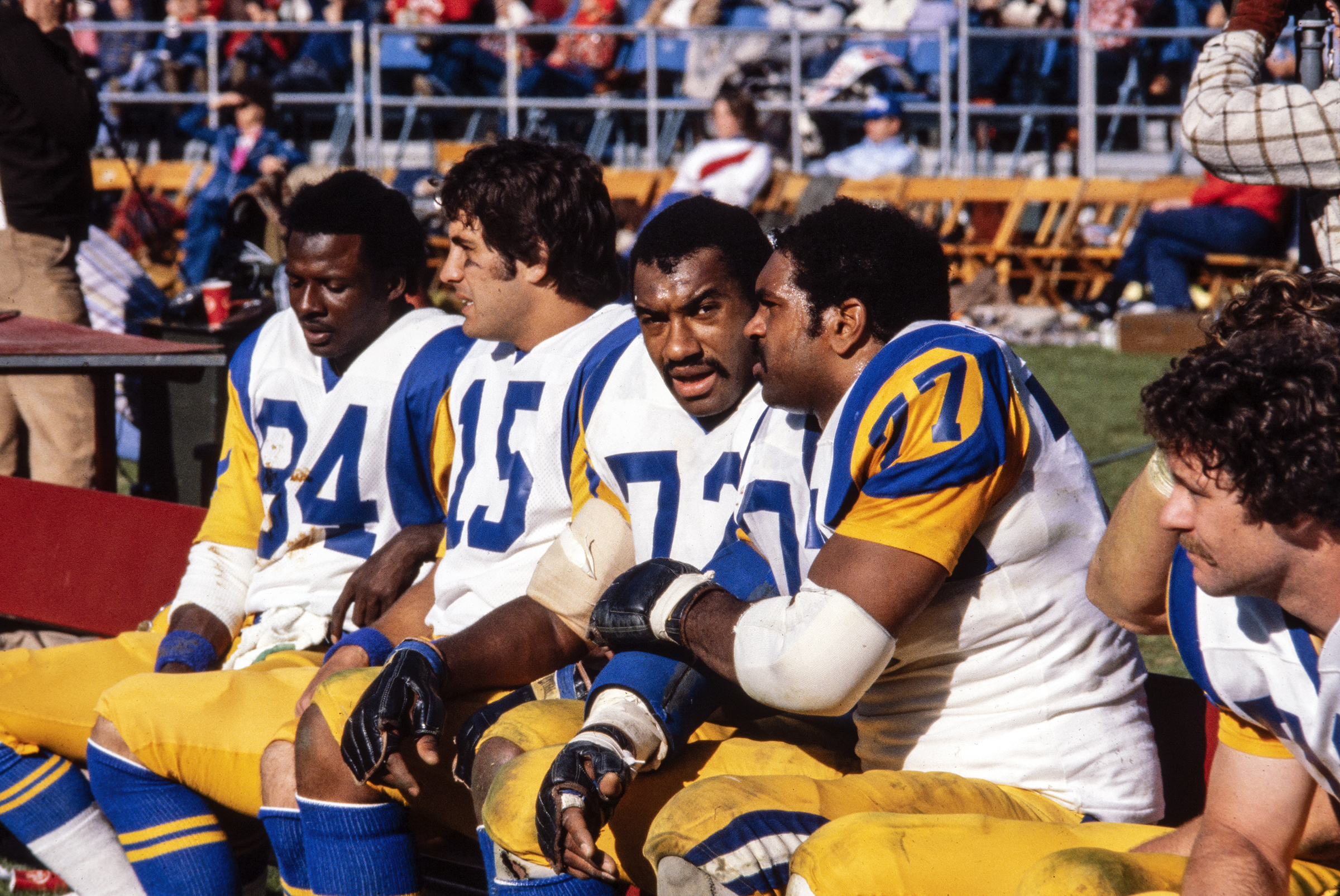
- Farmer (left) with Vince Ferragamo, Kent Hill and Gary Jeter, 1983

No. 84, 86
- Position: Wide receiver

Personal information
- Born: December 5, 1958 (age 67); Los Angeles, California, U.S.
- Listed height: 5 ft 10 in (1.78 m)
- Listed weight: 175 lb (79 kg)

Career information
- High school: Gardena (Gardena, California)
- College: Southern
- NFL draft: 1980: 9th round, 248th overall pick

Career history
- Los Angeles Rams (1982–1984); Miami Dolphins (1987)

Career NFL statistics
- Receptions: 65
- Receiving yards: 980
- Touchdowns: 7
- Stats at Pro Football Reference

George Farmer III (born December 5, 1958) is an American former professional football player who was a wide receiver in the National Football League (NFL). He played college football for the Southern Jaguars. He played four seasons in the NFL for the Los Angeles Rams from 1982 to 1984 and the Miami Dolphins in 1987. Farmer is the father of former USC wide receiver George Farmer.
