= Kirk Collins =

American football player (1958–1984)

No. 42
- Position: Cornerback

Personal information
- Born: July 18, 1958; San Antonio, Texas, U.S.
- Died: February 22, 1984 (aged 25); Anaheim, California, U.S.
- Listed height: 5 ft 11 in (1.80 m)
- Listed weight: 182 lb (83 kg)

Career information
- High school: Sam Houston (San Antonio)
- College: Baylor
- NFL draft: 1980: 7th round, 176th overall pick

Career history
- Los Angeles Rams (1980–1983)

Career NFL statistics
- Interceptions: 5
- Stats at Pro Football Reference

Edward Kirk Collins (July 18, 1958 – February 22, 1984) was an American professional football player who was a cornerback in the National Football League (NFL). He was selected by the Los Angeles Rams in the seventh round of the 1980 NFL draft. He played college football for the Baylor Bears.

After not playing as a rookie, Collins participated in all 16 games of the 1981 season and all nine games of the strike-abbreviated 1982 season. In 1983, Collins won the starting left cornerback position and began the season impressively with five interceptions in the season's first four games, including two in a game against the New York Jets.

But he tore a hamstring in the game and, after recovering from the injury, suffered from blurred vision and was coughing up blood during a practice and was then examined by team doctors. Collins was subsequently diagnosed with gastroesophageal cancer and immediately began treatment, ending his career. He died of the disease on February 22, 1984. At the time of his death, he had a wife, Ruby, and a son, Christopher, then eight months old. For the 1984 season, Rams teammates honored Collins by placing a "42" decal on the rear of their helmets.

== See also ==
- List of gridiron football players who died during their careers
