= Herb Paterra =

American gridiron football player and coach (born 1940)

Profile
- Position: Linebacker

Personal information
- Born: November 8, 1940 (age 85); Glassport, Pennsylvania, U.S.
- Listed height: 6 ft 1 in (1.85 m)
- Listed weight: 232 lb (105 kg)

Career information
- College: Michigan State
- AFL draft: 1963: 18th round, 140th overall pick

Career history

Playing
- 1963: Buffalo Bills
- 1965–1968: Hamilton Tiger-Cats

Coaching
- 1971–1972: Michigan State (LB)
- 1973–1974: Wyoming (LB)
- 1975: Charlotte Hornets
- 1976: North Mecklenburg HS (SC) (HC)
- 1977–1979: Hamilton Tiger-Cats (DC)
- 1980–1982: Los Angeles Rams (DC)
- 1983: Edmonton Eskimos (DC)
- 1984–1985: Green Bay Packers (LB/ST)
- 1986: Buffalo Bills (DC/LB)
- 1987–1988: Tampa Bay Buccaneers (LB)
- 1989–1991: Detroit Lions (LB)
- 1992: Detroit Lions (DC)
- 1993: Detroit Lions (LB)
- 1994–1995: Detroit Lions (DC)
- 1999–2002: Vanderbilt (DC/LB)
- 2003–2004: Southeastern Louisiana (LB)
- 2005–2006: New Mexico State (LB)

Awards and highlights
- 2× Grey Cup champion (1965, 1967)
- Stats at Pro Football Reference

Herbert E. Paterra (born November 8, 1940) is an American former gridiron football player and coach. He spent a total of 46 years in football and coached at all levels of the game, retiring in 2007. He served as defensive coordinator for the Los Angeles Rams, Buffalo Bills, and Detroit Lions of the National Football League.
