= Irv Pankey =

American football player (born 1958)

No. 75
- Position: Offensive tackle

Personal information
- Born: February 15, 1958 (age 68); Aberdeen, Maryland, U.S.
- Listed height: 6 ft 4 in (1.93 m)
- Listed weight: 277 lb (126 kg)

Career information
- High school: Aberdeen
- College: Penn State
- NFL draft: 1980: 2nd round, 50th overall pick

Career history
- Los Angeles Rams (1980–1990); Indianapolis Colts (1991–1992)

Awards and highlights
- First-team All-East (1979)

Career NFL statistics
- Games played: 150
- Games started: 122
- Fumble recoveries: 6
- Stats at Pro Football Reference

Irvin Lee Pankey (born February 15, 1958) is an American former professional football player who was an offensive lineman for 12 seasons in the National Football League (NFL), mainly for the Los Angeles Rams. He played college football as a tight end and offensive tackle for the Penn State Nittany Lions and was a team captain in 1979. He attended Aberdeen High School in Aberdeen, Maryland.

== Personal life ==
During his playing career at Penn State, he reached out to Betsy Sailor, a student who had been raped by Todd Hodne in 1978, a former Penn State player who had recently been suspended from the team. Sailor had experienced harassment after having testified against Hodne at his trial. In a 2022 ESPN story on Hodne, who would sexually assault nearly a dozen other women before being convicted of murder, Sailor recalled Pankey telling her, "I just wanted to let you know that I was in the courtroom today and I listened to what you had to say. And I believe every word that you said. And, you will never have to be afraid, or be alone again. I will be by your side." Pankey and Sailor would lose contact after they graduated from Penn State, but would be reunited while the ESPN story was being researched.

Pankey has twin sons who played college football for Oregon State; Keith Pankey played linebacker, and his brother, Kevin, was a tight end. He has a daughter, Kiley, who attended Mt. Whitney High School in Visalia, California. Pankey served as a professor and offensive line coach at the College of the Sequoias in Visalia, California. Pankey also helps out at football camps such as Linemen Inc.
