= Phil Murphy (American football) =

American football player (born 1957)

No. 95, 72
- Position: Defensive tackle

Personal information
- Born: September 26, 1957 (age 69); New London, Connecticut, U.S.
- Listed height: 6 ft 5 in (1.96 m)
- Listed weight: 290 lb (132 kg)

Career information
- High school: Xavier (Middletown, Connecticut)
- College: South Carolina State
- NFL draft: 1980: 3rd round, 82nd overall pick

Career history
- Los Angeles Rams (1980-1981); St. Louis Cardinals (1982)*; Los Angeles Express (1983)
- * Offseason or practice squad member only

Career NFL statistics
- Sacks: 1.5
- Fumble recoveries: 1
- Stats at Pro Football Reference

Philip John Murphy (born September 26, 1957) is an American former professional football player who was a defensive tackle in the National Football League (NFL). He was selected by the Los Angeles Rams in the third round of the 1980 NFL draft. Murphy played college football for the South Carolina State Bulldogs.
