= Jairo Penaranda =

Colombian gridiron football player (born 1958)

No. 22, 21, 38
- Position: Running back / special teamer

Personal information
- Born: June 15, 1958 (age 68); Barranquilla, Colombia
- Listed height: 5 ft 11 in (1.80 m)
- Listed weight: 217 lb (98 kg)

Career information
- High school: John Burroughs (Burbank, California, U.S.)
- College: Los Angeles Valley (1976–1977); UCLA (1978–1980)
- NFL draft: 1981: 12th round, 328th overall pick

Career history

Playing
- Los Angeles Rams (1981); Arizona Wranglers (1983)*; Oakland Invaders (1983); Memphis Showboats (1984); San Francisco 49ers (1984)*; Philadelphia Eagles (1985)
- * Offseason or practice squad member only

Coaching
- Memphis Showboats (1985) Special teams coach; USC Trojans (1987–1988) Volunteer assistant/special teams; Los Angeles Rams (1989) Assistant special teams coach; Los Angeles Rams (1990) Special teams coach
- Stats at Pro Football Reference

Jairo Alonso Penaranda (born June 15, 1958) is a Colombian former professional American football player. Born in Barranquilla, his family moved to the U.S. when he was age two. He attended John Burroughs High School in California where he was a top running back, then played college football for the Los Angeles Valley Monarchs from 1976 to 1977. Afterwards, Penaranda walked-on to play for the UCLA Bruins and was used as a fullback in 1979 and 1980. He was selected by the Los Angeles Rams in the 12th round of the 1981 NFL draft and played for them that year, winning the team's special teams player of the year award. He later played for the Oakland Invaders and Memphis Showboats of the United States Football League (USFL) from 1983 to 1984 before concluding his career in the NFL with the Philadelphia Eagles in 1985. He was also a member of the Arizona Wranglers in the USFL and the San Francisco 49ers in the NFL. Following his playing career, Penaranda worked as a coach. He is distinguished as being the first Colombian to play in the NFL.

== Early life ==
Penaranda was born on June 15, 1958, in Barranquilla, Colombia. At age two, his family moved to Miami in the U.S. He explained the move was because "my father didn't want to work for my grandfather after he married my mom", though the family often returned to visit. They later moved to Burbank, California. He saw American football being played for the first time when he was age 12. He began playing football in seventh grade, noting that when he first played, "I just stood there and blocked and tackled. I didn't know anything else." Penaranda attended John Burroughs High School in Burbank where he played football and was a top running back, playing from 1972 to 1975.

Penaranda was the team captain for both the football and track and field teams. He played with his two brothers in football and was selected all-state and All-CIF during his senior season, which included one game where he scored five touchdowns. He was also selected to the Valley All-Star game. His coach recalled him as:

one of the best all-around backs in Burroughs history. He reminded me of Roger Craig, the way he ran. He'd get those knees pumping way up high and it was very difficult to tackle him. Very difficult. I remember Jairo dragging people down the football field a lot. And he never made an attempt to evade people on the field. He went after them.

== College career ==
Penaranda had interest from several schools to play college football, but most asked him to move to linebacker. Wanting to stay on offense, he attended Los Angeles Valley College and played football there from 1976 to 1977. The Los Angeles Times reported that at Los Angeles Valley, he "just ran the heck out of the ball", earning All-Metro Conference honors. In 1977, he ran for 622 yards and 14 touchdowns while averaging 4.7 yards per carry. After the season, Penaranda had offers from several small schools to play fullback. However, he wanted to play at a large school. Telling his Los Angeles Valley coach about his interest in trying out for the UCLA Bruins, his coach said "It would be like climbing Mount Everest". Penaranda said that it would be like "The Santa Monica hills, maybe. Not Mount Everest," through he later noted it was "like climbing Mount Everest and then some".

Penaranda walked on at UCLA in 1978 and was a member of the scout team that year, appearing in no games. He played as a fullback and on special teams for UCLA in 1979, running four times for 13 yards. He increased his size from 195 pounds (88 kg) as a junior to 220 pounds (100 kg) as a senior and was considered a top blocker for the Bruins in 1980. The Times said that his added weight was "all muscle" and that his "waistline remained the same but his tights just about exploded. He's had to take all his pants in for tailoring to accommodate his new physique". In the first game of the 1980 season, he ran for 33 yards on four carries and scored two touchdowns. Penaranda helped UCLA to a record of 9–2 and ran 55 times for 254 yards and two touchdowns, averaging 4.6 yards per run.

During his college and later professional career, some believed that one of Penaranda's hobbies in Colombia was riding llamas, something that made its way into team media guides. This came about due to a picture of a 13-year-old Penaranda "fooling around" on a llama, with one of his college teammates seeing it and later stating on a radio broadcast that he enjoyed "broncing llamas". The Press of Atlantic City noted that "To Penaranda, it seemed just about every publication in the Los Angeles area started calling, wanting to know about this llama-broncing. Although Penaranda tried to convince everyone there was nothing to it, the legend never seemed to die."

== Professional career ==
Penaranda was selected by the Los Angeles Rams in the 12th round, with the 328th overall pick, of the 1981 NFL draft. As a special teams player, he made the team and appeared in all 16 games for the Rams during the 1981 season. He was the NFL's first Colombian-born player. The Rams compiled a record of 6–10, and Penaranda's only statistic with them was a one-yard kickoff return. At the end of the season, he was honored as the team's special teams player of the year. He was released by the Rams on September 6, 1982, prior to the 1982 season. After being released by the Rams, he signed with the Arizona Wranglers of the United States Football League (USFL) on November 11, 1982, only to be released on February 7, 1983, prior to the 1983 USFL season. Penaranda later signed with the USFL's Oakland Invaders on February 17, 1983, and played for them as a backup fullback that year. Appearing in all 18 games for the Invaders, he recorded 10 rushes for 28 yards, seven catches for 42 yards, and scored a safety.

Penaranda was selected by the Memphis Showboats in the 1983 USFL expansion draft. He played in eight games for Memphis during the 1984 season, running 19 times for 53 yards and catching three passes for 16 yards and a touchdown. After the USFL season, he returned to the NFL by signing with the San Francisco 49ers on May 12, 1984, though he was placed on injured reserve on August 27 and then released on September 5. He did not play during the 1985 USFL season, instead serving as special teams coach for the Showboats. Under Penaranda, the Showboats special teams returned four punts for touchdowns. He also signed with the Philadelphia Eagles for the 1985 NFL season, though he was released in August. Penaranda was studying at UCLA when he later was asked to return to the Eagles in late November 1985. Having not played in months, he was asked about his conditioning and told the Eagles that "I can run 75 yards down field as fast as I can – and then I can jog to the oxygen tank". He signed with the team on November 27 and appeared in four games for the Eagles, recording no statistics. He re-signed with the Eagles for the 1986 season but was later released on August 12, 1986, ending his professional career.

== Later life ==
In 1987, Penaranda volunteered as an assistant coach for the USC Trojans, working with special teams. He served for two years at USC and joined the NFL's Los Angeles Rams in 1989 as an assistant special teams coach. In 1990, he was promoted to special teams coach, a position he served in for one season. In 1991, he married Maria Vertopoulos, whom he had met on a flight while working with the Rams. After his football career, Penaranda worked as an agent for Farmers Insurance Group in Oregon.
