= Ray Malavasi =

American football player and coach (1930–1987)

Profile
- Position: Guard

Personal information
- Born: November 8, 1930; Passaic, New Jersey, U.S.
- Died: December 15, 1987 (aged 57); Santa Ana, California, U.S.
- Listed height: 5 ft 11 in (1.80 m)
- Listed weight: 210 lb (95 kg)

Career information
- High school: Clifton (NJ)
- College: Army; Mississippi State
- NFL draft: 1953: 7th round, 82nd overall pick

Career history

Coaching
- Fort Belvoir (1954–1955) Line coach; Minnesota (1956–1957) Assistant; Memphis State (1958–1960) Assistant; Wake Forest (1961) Assistant; Denver Broncos (1963-1965) Defensive line; Denver Broncos (1966) Head coach; Hamilton Tiger-Cats (1967–1968) Defensive assistant; Buffalo Bills (1969-1970) Defensive line; Oakland Raiders (1971–1972) Linebackers; Los Angeles Rams (1973–1977) Defensive coordinator; Los Angeles Rams (1978–1982) Head coach; Oakland Invaders (1984) Assistant; Los Angeles Express (1984) Defensive coordinator; Australian national team (1987)

Operations
- Denver Broncos (1962–1963) Personnel director

Head coaching record
- Regular season: 44–41–0 (.518)
- Postseason: 3–3 (.500)
- Career: 47–44–0 (.516)
- Coaching profile at Pro Football Reference

Raymondo Guiseppi Giovanni Baptiste Malavasi (/mæləˈveɪsiː/ mal-ə-VAY-see; November 8, 1930 – December 15, 1987) was an American football coach who served as head coach of two professional teams: the Denver Broncos and Los Angeles Rams.

== Early life ==
Born in Passaic, New Jersey, Malavasi grew up in neighboring Clifton and graduated from Clifton High School in 1948; as a member of the football team, he called plays from his position as offensive tackle, because he was the player best able to remember the playbook.

Malavasi then entered the U.S. Military Academy at West Point, starting at offensive guard for the Cadet football team. Under head coach Earl Blaik and line coach Vince Lombardi, Malavasi played two years, with Blaik rating him as the greatest line prospect during his tenure at the academy. That potential disappeared when Malavasi was one of 90 cadets who left in the wake of a cheating scandal in August 1951.

Malavasi left to attend Mississippi State University, earning a degree in engineering while serving as an assistant under head coach Murray Warmath in 1952 and also receiving an Army ROTC commission. In 1953, he tried out and was released by the NFL's Philadelphia Eagles, then served as line coach with the Fort Belvoir army unit for two years beginning in 1954.

After his military service, Malavasi accepted an assistant's role with the University of Minnesota in 1956, also under Warmath, spending two seasons with the Golden Gophers. He took a similar position with Memphis State University in 1958. Three years in Tennessee led to a single year with the Wake Forest University in 1961.

== Professional football ==
=== Denver Broncos ===
Malavasi gained his first position in professional football in 1962 as the personnel director of the American Football League's Denver Broncos.

In 1963, Malavasi also took on the duties of defensive line coach for the Broncos, and shifted to the offensive line prior to the start of the 1966 season. After Denver dropped their first two games, head coach Mac Speedie abruptly resigned, and Malavasi became the interim head coach for the final twelve games. The Broncos managed just four wins and ownership then hired Lou Saban as head coach and general manager for 1967.

=== Hamilton Tiger-Cats ===
For the next two years, Malavasi coached on the defensive side of the ball with the Canadian Football League's Hamilton Tiger-Cats under head coaches Ralph Sazio and Joe Restic.

=== Buffalo Bills ===
Malavasi accepted the defensive line assistant's position with the Buffalo Bills on February 3, 1969 and stayed for two seasons under head coach John Rauch.

=== Oakland Raiders ===
Malavasi left to work for the Oakland Raiders in 1971 under head coach John Madden, but resigned after just two years, citing the frustration with the team keeping him from advancing his career.

=== Los Angeles Rams ===
Malavasi's resignation caused controversy when Madden accused another team of tampering with Malavasi's services. While he denied the charges, Malavasi was hired on June 5, 1973, as a defensive assistant with the Los Angeles Rams under new head coach Chuck Knox. Over the next five years, Malavasi rose to defensive coordinator, and was under consideration for head coaching positions with both the Eagles and Chicago Bears. He also was looked at as head coach for the Rams after the departure of Knox for Buffalo following the 1977 season, but stayed as defensive coordinator under George Allen in 1978.

However, after just two exhibition games, Allen was fired by owner Carroll Rosenbloom and Malavasi was promoted to head coach, He led the team to their sixth straight NFC West title with 12–4 record, reaching the NFC Championship game. The following year, the team barely finished above .500 with a 9–7 mark, but the NFC West was so weak that the Rams won their seventh straight division title. In the playoffs, the Rams upset the Cowboys, then shut down the upstart Tampa Bay Buccaneers 9–0 in the conference title game to give the franchise its first Super Bowl berth ever, nearly a home game at the Rose Bowl in Pasadena. Entering the fourth quarter of Super Bowl XIV with a two-point lead over the heavily favored Pittsburgh Steelers, the Rams' upset bid came up short when they allowed two touchdowns and fell 31–19.

An 11–5 mark in 1980 was a two-game improvement over 1979, but it was only good enough for second place behind the Atlanta Falcons in the NFC West, and the Rams fell in the wild-card round to the Cowboys. The following year, the rise of the San Francisco 49ers ended the Rams' reign and saddled them with a 6–10 record. Following a 2–7 mark during the strike-shortened 1982 season, the worst record in the 14-team NFC, Malavasi was dismissed on January 4, 1983.

== After the NFL ==
In 1983, Malavasi worked as a color commentator for NFL games on Mutual radio. He also served as a consultant and unofficial spokesman for the proposed International Football League, a league that served the dual purpose of introducing professional football abroad as well as serving as an antagonist to the United States Football League (Malavasi vowed that the league would hold its draft and opening kickoff one week before the USFL's respective dates, no matter what the USFL did). The IFL folded without any teams organizing; after the league's failure, Malavasi resurfaced as an assistant with the USFL's Oakland Invaders in early 1984. He left that position just after the start of the season to become defensive coordinator of the league's Los Angeles Express, but the financial woes of the team ended his brief tenure in the final weeks of the season.

Malavasi was never again on the sidelines for an NFL team, but he did coach the first ever Australian national American football team in 1987. The Australian Kookaburras did a week-long training camp at Dominguez Hills in southern California before heading off for a tour of Europe, where they played three games. Malavasi was assisted with the team by Johnny Johnson.

== Death ==
Less than two months after returning from the tour with the Australian team, Malavasi died at age 57 of a sudden heart attack on December 15, 1987, He died at Western Medical Center in Santa Ana, and was buried at Pacific View Memorial Park in Corona del Mar.

== Popular culture ==
While the Rams' head coach, he appeared on an episode of Fantasy Island as himself in March 1979, along with several of his players.

During the 1981 season, Malavasi was set to do a weekly morning call-in segment with disc jockey Robert W. Morgan on the Rams' flagship station KMPC 710 AM. But while on standby, Malavasi fell asleep and could be heard snoring as Morgan proceeded in vain to question the Rams coach. The attempted radio interview later was widely circulated.

== Head coaching record ==
Team	Year	Regular season					Postseason			
Team	Year	Won	Lost	Ties	Win %	Finish	Won	Lost	Win %	Result
DEN	1966	4	8	0	.333	4th in AFL West Division	–	–	–	–
DEN Total		4	8	0	.333		–	–	–	–
AFL Total		4	8	0	.333		–	–	–	–
LA	1978	12	4	0	.750	1st in NFC West	1	1	.500	Lost to Dallas Cowboys in NFC Championship
LA	1979	9	7	0	.563	1st in NFC West	2	1	.667	Lost to Pittsburgh Steelers in Super Bowl XIV
LA	1980	11	5	0	.688	2nd in NFC West	0	1	.000	Lost to Dallas Cowboys in Wild Card Game
LA	1981	6	10	0	.375	3rd in NFC West	–	–	–	–
LA	1982	2	7	0	.222	4th in NFC West	–	–	–	–
LA Total		40	33	0	.548		3	3	.500	–
NFL Total		40	33	0	.548		3	3	.500	–
Total		44	41	0	.518		3	3	.500	–
