= Howard Carson (American football) =

American football player (1957–2021)

Hueland Howard Carson
No. 54
- Position: Linebacker

Personal information
- Born: February 11, 1957; Hico, Texas
- Died: January 21, 2021 (aged 63); Austin, Texas
- Listed height: 6 ft 2 in (1.88 m)
- Listed weight: 233 lb (106 kg)

Career information
- High school: Grapevine (TX)
- College: Howard Payne University

Career history
- Los Angeles Rams (1981–1983); Los Angeles Express (1984–1985)
- Stats at Pro Football Reference

Hueland Howard Carson (February 11, 1957 – January 21, 2021), known professionally as Howard Carson, was an American linebacker for the Los Angeles Rams. He was born in Hico, Texas, and attended Grapevine High School. After graduating high school, he began his collegiate career with the Howard Payne Yellow Jackets. He played in the NFL from 1981 to 1983, playing 28 games while starting two of them. He died in Austin, Texas, on January 21, 2021, at age 63.
