= Lucious Smith =

American football player (born 1957)

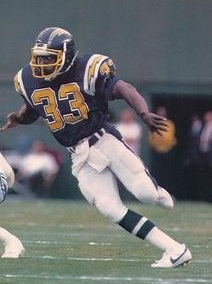
- Smith c. 1985

No. 23, 47, 33
- Position: Cornerback

Personal information
- Born: January 17, 1957 (age 69); Columbus, Georgia, U.S.
- Listed height: 5 ft 10 in (1.78 m)
- Listed weight: 190 lb (86 kg)

Career information
- High school: Kearny (San Diego, California)
- College: Cal State-Fullerton
- NFL draft: 1980: undrafted

Career history
- Los Angeles Rams (1980–1982); Kansas City Chiefs (1983); Buffalo Bills (1984); San Diego Chargers (1984–1985)

Career NFL statistics
- Interceptions: 4
- Fumble recoveries: 4
- Touchdowns: 1
- Stats at Pro Football Reference

Lucious Irvin Smith (born January 17, 1957) is an American former professional football player who was a cornerback in the National Football League (NFL). He played college football for the Cal State Fullerton Titans and San Diego State Aztecs. He was signed by the Los Angeles Rams as an undrafted free agent in 1980.

Smith also played for the Kansas City Chiefs, Buffalo Bills, and San Diego Chargers.

In Later Life he has shifted careers becoming a professional fitness trainer and has also transitioned to a plant-based Vegan diet for more than a decade already, has been featured in the 2018 Documentary The Game Changers.
