= Billy Waddy =

American football player (1954–2022)

No. 80
- Position: Wide receiver

Personal information
- Born: February 19, 1954; Wharton, Texas, U.S.
- Died: January 21, 2022 (aged 67); New Brighton, Minnesota, U.S.
- Listed height: 5 ft 11 in (1.80 m)
- Listed weight: 188 lb (85 kg)

Career information
- High school: Boling, Texas
- College: Colorado
- NFL draft: 1977: 2nd round, 50th overall pick

Career history
- Los Angeles Rams (1977–1982); Minnesota Vikings (1984)

Awards and highlights
- PFWA All-Rookie Team (1977)

Career NFL statistics
- Receptions: 120
- Receiving yards: 1,973
- Receiving touchdowns: 10
- Stats at Pro Football Reference

Billy Dean Waddy (February 19, 1954 – January 21, 2022) was an American professional football player who played wide receiver for seven seasons for the Los Angeles Rams and the Minnesota Vikings.

Waddy was a legitimate deep threat, who averaged 16.4 yards per catch over the course of his career. Relying on his speed and agility, Billy made big plays in one of the most significant games of his career—the Rams' shocking 21–19 upset of Dallas in the 1979 divisional playoffs, where he scored a game-winning 50-yard touchdown with just over two minutes to play.

Several weeks later, in Super Bowl XIV against Pittsburgh, the threat of him getting open deep down the field was a constant concern to the Steelers' defensive coaches—and for good reason, as he caught three passes for 75 yards, including a 50-yard completion from quarterback Vince Ferragamo. Late in the fourth quarter, with the Rams trailing 24–19, Waddy was wide open, streaking down the left side of the field on a play where the inexperienced Rams quarterback could not spot him, and threw an interception underneath in the middle of the field, essentially ending Los Angeles' chances in the 31–19 loss.

He died in New Brighton, Minnesota, on January 21, 2022, at the age of 67.
