= Kent Hill =

American football player (born 1957)

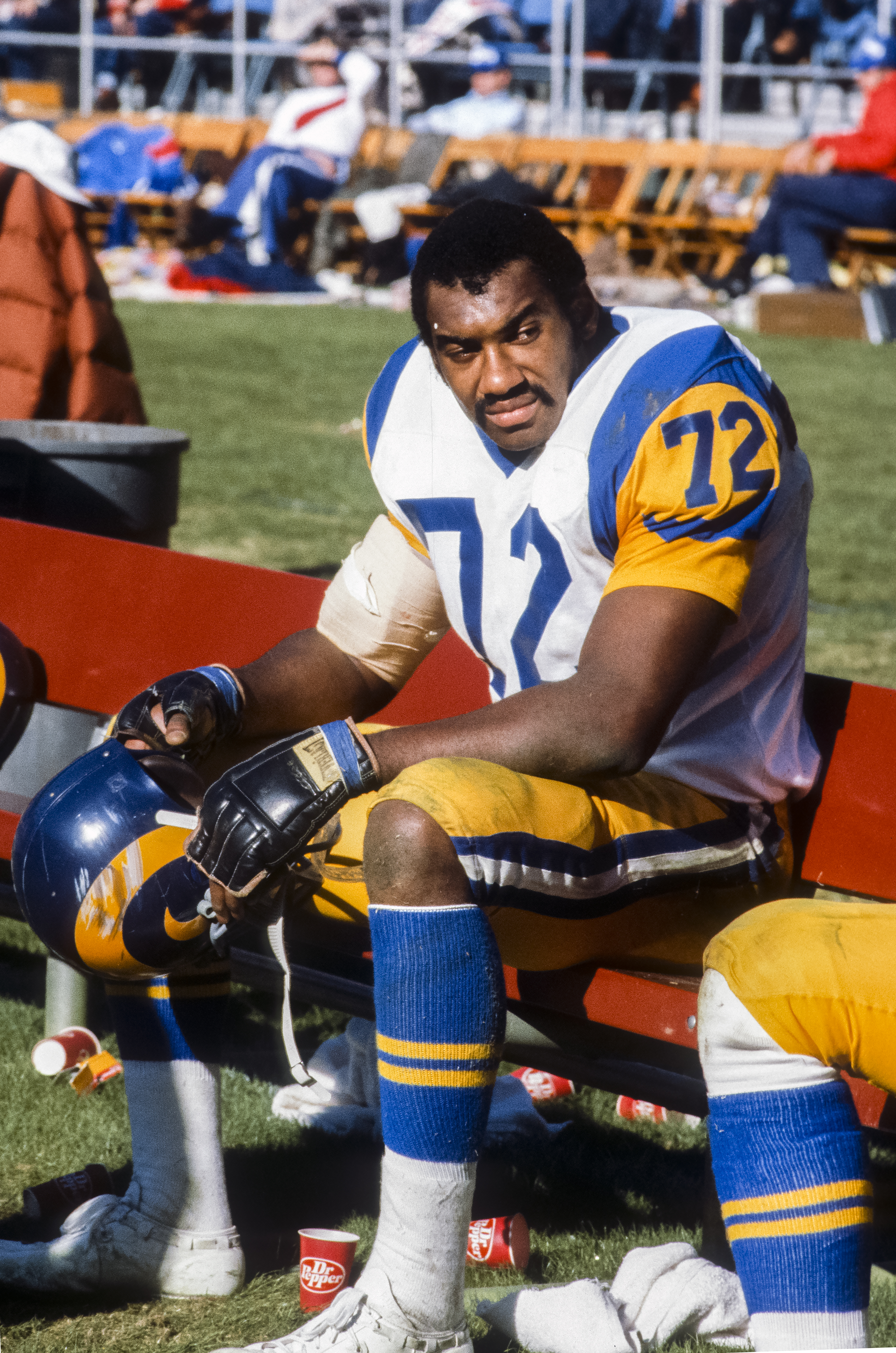
- Hill at a Rams-Falcons game in 1983

No. 72
- Position: Offensive guard

Personal information
- Born: March 7, 1957 (age 69); Americus, Georgia, U.S.
- Listed height: 6 ft 5 in (1.96 m)
- Listed weight: 260 lb (118 kg)

Career information
- College: Georgia Tech
- NFL draft: 1979: 1st round, 26th overall pick

Career history
- Los Angeles Rams (1979–1986); Houston Oilers (1986–1987)

Awards and highlights
- 2× Second-team All-Pro (1980, 1985); 5× Pro Bowl (1980, 1982–1985)

Career NFL statistics
- Games played: 132
- Games started: 114
- Fumble recoveries: 2
- Stats at Pro Football Reference

Kent Angelo Hill (born March 7, 1957) is an American former professional football player who was an offensive lineman guard for nine seasons in the National Football League (NFL), starting eight seasons for the Los Angeles Rams before finishing his career with the Houston Oilers. He played college football for the Georgia Tech Yellow Jackets and was selected 26th overall in the first round of the 1979 NFL draft. He was named to five Pro Bowls in the NFL.

Following retirement from professional football, Hill was director of student athlete development at Georgia Tech from 1989 to 1998. In later years he was a corporate personnel development consultant.
