= Los Angeles Rams all-time roster (Kir–Z) =

1,725 players have appeared in at least one regular season or postseason game in the National Football League (NFL) for the Los Angeles Rams franchise since 1936. This list includes those whose last names fall between "Kir" and "Z". For the rest of the players, see Los Angeles Rams all-time roster (A–Kin). This list is accurate through the end of the 2025 NFL season.

== Kir-Ku ==
- Ken Kirk
- Jon Kirksey
- Micah Kiser
- Bob Klein
- Joe Klopfenstein
- Bruce Klosterman
- Don Klosterman
- Suge Knight
- George Koch
- Jeremiah Kolone
- Floyd Konetsky
- J.J. Koski
- Michael Kostiuk
- Johnny Kovatch
- Gary Kowalski
- Bill Krause
- Dan Kreider
- John Ksionzyk
- Cooper Kupp
- Eric Kush

== L ==
- Sean LaChapelle
- Mike LaHood
- Aaron Laing
- Quentin Lake
- Cam Lampkin
- Chuck Lamson
- Sean Landeta
- Nathan Landman
- Night Train Lane
- David Lang
- Izzy Lang
- Bill Lange
- Kendall Langford
- Buck Lansford
- Mike Lansford
- Myron Lapka
- Gary Larsen
- Kwamie Lassiter
- Jerry Latin
- Jim Laughlin
- James Laurinaitis
- Justin Lawler
- Bill Lazetich
- Mike Lazetich
- Les Lear
- Ben Leber
- Nick Leckey
- Amp Lee
- Bob Lee
- Earl Leggett
- Paris Lenon
- Brian Leonard
- Tim Lester
- Mark LeVoir
- Len Levy
- Art Lewis
- Chad Lewis
- Damione Lewis
- Dave Lewis
- Michael Lewis
- Terrell Lewis
- Woodley Lewis
- Sonny Liles
- George Lilja
- Sammy Lilly
- Beaux Limmer
- Jeremy Lincoln
- Gene Lipscomb
- Leonard Little
- Carl Littlefield
- Cory Littleton
- Cliff Livingston
- Ted Livingston
- Brandon Lloyd
- Kerry Locklin
- James Lofton
- Chip Lohmiller
- Tony Lomack
- Keith Loneker
- Bob Long (born 1934)
- Bob Long (born 1942)
- Chris Long
- Chuck Long
- Darren Long
- David Long
- Hunter Long
- Jake Long
- Matt Longacre
- Dane Looker
- Billy Lothridge
- Duval Love
- John Love
- David Loverne
- John LoVetere
- Jeremy Loyd
- Cornelius Lucas
- Justin Lucas
- Lamar Lundy
- Todd Lyght
- Keith Lyle
- Del Lyman
- Cameron Lynch

== M ==
- Tom Mack
- Tommy Maddox
- Dante Magnani
- Brett Maher
- Frank Maher
- Ricky Manning
- Sean Mannion
- Brandon Manumaleuna
- Frank Marchlewski
- Joe Marconi
- Vic Markov
- Bradley Marquez
- Larry Marshall
- Aaron Martin
- Chris Martin
- Jack Martin
- Jamie Martin
- Ruvell Martin
- Matt Maslowski
- Tommy Mason
- Tre Mason
- Chris Massey
- Chris Matau
- Riley Matheson
- Ochaun Mathis
- Ollie Matson
- Clay Matthews III
- Bryan Mattison
- Harry Mattos
- Jack May
- Carl Mayes
- Baker Mayfield
- Tod McBride
- Gerald McBurrows
- Warren McClendon
- Dexter McCleon
- Jaylen McCollough
- Andy McCollum
- Tom McCormick
- Roger McCreary
- Lance McCutcheon
- Lawrence McCutcheon
- James McDonald
- Mike McDonald
- Shaun McDonald
- T. J. McDonald
- Tommy McDonald
- Paul McDonough
- Marshall McFadden
- Bud McFadin
- Tim McGarigle
- Barney McGarry
- Brandon McGee
- Buford McGee
- Willie McGee
- Ed McGlasson
- Dusty McGrorty
- Danny McIlhany
- Rocky McIntosh
- Paul McJulien
- Marlin McKeever
- Takkarist McKinley
- Phil McKinnely
- Kevin McLain
- Leon McLaughlin
- Steve McLaughlin
- Rodney McLeod
- Dylan McMahon
- Randy McMichael
- Eddie McMillan
- Travis McNeal
- Ryan McNeil
- Mike McNeill
- Jake McQuaide
- Bill McRaven
- Paul McRoberts
- Ed Meador
- Greg Meisner
- Jim Mello
- Art Mergenthal
- Mark Messner
- Harrison Mevis
- Lou Michaels
- Sony Michel
- Jeff Mickel
- Ron Middleton
- Quintin Mikell
- Joe Milinichik
- Hugh Millen
- Brit Miller
- Chris Miller
- Clark Miller
- Drew Miller
- Fred Miller
- Keith Miller
- Nick Miller
- Ookie Miller
- Paul Miller
- Primo Miller
- Ron Miller (born 1933)
- Ron Miller (born 1939)
- Shawn Miller
- Von Miller
- Willie Miller
- Hanik Milligan
- Billy Milner
- Travis Minor
- John Misko
- Lydell Mitchell
- Kelly Moan
- Stacey Mobley
- Frank Molden
- Ray Monaco
- Derrick Moncrief
- Tex Mooney
- Eric Moore
- Jeff Moore
- Jerald Moore
- Malcolm Moore
- Ronald Moore
- Tom Moore
- Sean Moran
- Matt Morgan
- George Morris
- Jack Morris
- Larry Morris
- John Morrow
- Mike Morton
- Brent Moss
- Rudy Mucha
- Matthew Mulligan
- Konata Mumpfield
- Johnny Mundt
- Bill Munson
- Larrell Murchison
- Harvey Murphy
- Jerome Murphy
- Pace Murphy
- Phil Murphy
- Yo Murphy
- Joe Murray
- Brad Myers
- Jack Myers

== N ==
- Puka Nacua
- Joe Namath
- JoJo Natson
- Fred Naumetz
- Spencer Nead
- Elias Neal
- Aaron Neary
- Ryan Neill
- Bill Nelson
- Chuck Nelson
- Terry Nelson
- Steve Nemeth
- Nate Ness
- Jim Nettles
- Tom Newberry
- Anthony Newman
- Vince Newsome
- Tony Newson
- Bob Nichols
- Ralph Niehaus
- Jack Nix
- David Nixon
- Don Noble
- Jerious Norwood
- Joseph Noteboom
- Ty Nsekhe
- Keith Null
- Tom Nütten
- Rick Nuzum

== O ==
- Herman O'Berry
- Ricky Odom
- Chris Ogbonnaya
- Alec Ogletree
- Quinn Ojinnaka
- Ogbonnia Okoronkwo
- Merlin Olsen
- Norm Olsen
- Phil Olsen
- Glenn Olson
- Leslie O'Neal
- Bill O'Neill
- Fendi Onobun
- Kareem Orr
- Matthew Orzech
- Chuck Osborne
- Dwayne O'Steen
- Brad Ottis
- Mel Owens
- Richard Owens

== P ==
- Orlando Pace
- Chris Pacheco
- Mike Pagel
- Jeff Pahukoa
- Ken Panfil
- Irv Pankey
- Jack Pardee
- Don Parish
- Anthony Parker
- Colby Parkinson
- Cord Parks
- Joe Pasqua
- Ralph Pasquariello
- Dan Pastorini
- Natrez Patrick
- Maury Patt
- Eric Patterson
- Mark Pattison
- Don Paul
- Elvis Peacock
- Isaiah Pead
- Troy Pelshak
- Jairo Penaranda
- John Pergine
- Art Perkins
- Bryce Perkins
- Mike Perrie
- Gerald Perry
- Rod Perry
- Mike Person
- John Petchel
- Marcus Peters
- Jim Peterson
- Kevin Peterson
- Nelson Peterson
- Richie Petitbon
- Rob Petitti
- Austin Pettis
- Roman Phifer
- George Phillips
- Joe Phillips
- Lawrence Phillips
- Red Phillips
- Rod Phillips
- Ryan Pickett
- Mike Piel
- Bob Pifferini
- Chris Pike
- Roger Pillath
- Stan Pincura
- Jared Pinkney
- Lovell Pinkney
- Antonio Pittman
- Elijah Pitts
- Hugh Pitts
- Dave Pivec
- George Platukis
- Mike Pleasant
- Milt Plum
- Tony Plummer
- Warren Plunkett
- Quinton Pointer
- Jachai Polite
- Tommy Polley
- Willie Ponder
- Bucky Pope
- Marquez Pope
- Brady Poppinga
- Quinn Porter
- Myron Pottios
- Brandon Powell
- Tim Powell
- Warren Powers
- Dale Prather
- Steve Preece
- Brennan Presley
- Ejuan Price
- Jim Price
- Mitchell Price
- Bosh Pritchard
- Steve Pritko
- Ray Prochaska
- Ricky Proehl
- Chet Pudloski
- Dave Purling
- Jim Purnell
- Duane Putnam

== Q ==
- Bernard Quarles
- David Quessenberry
- Brian Quick
- Skeets Quinlan
- Robert Quinn

== R ==
- Phil Ragazzo
- Jalen Ramsey
- LaJuan Ramsey
- Manny Rapp
- Taylor Rapp
- David Ray
- Jimmy Raye III
- Charles Ream
- Barry Redden
- Geoff Reece
- John Reece
- Doug Reed
- J. R. Reed (born 1982)
- J. R. Reed (born 1996)
- Troy Reeder
- Booker Reese
- Joe Reid
- Mike Reilly
- Bob Reinhard
- Albie Reisz
- Lance Rentzel
- Joe Repko
- Chase Reynolds
- Garrett Reynolds
- Jack Reynolds
- Joffrey Reynolds
- Josh Reynolds
- Demetrius Rhaney
- Jerry Rhome
- Herb Rich
- Barry Richardson
- Daryl Richardson
- Jerry Richardson
- Reggie Richardson
- Les Richter
- Paul Rickards
- Bill Rieth
- Charley Riffle
- Derek Rivers
- Gerald Rivers
- Ronnie Rivers
- David Roach
- Fred Robbins
- Kevin Robbins
- Marcus Roberson
- Isiah Robertson
- Nickell Robey
- Allen Robinson
- A'Shawn Robinson
- Bryan Robinson
- Demarcus Robinson
- Gerald Robinson
- Greg Robinson (born 1969)
- Greg Robinson (born 1992)
- Jack Robinson
- Jeff Robinson
- Laurent Robinson
- Andy Robustelli
- Robert Rochell
- David Rocker
- Hank Rockwell
- Mike Rodak
- Mel Rogers
- Henry Rolling
- Brett Romberg
- Joe Rose
- Ted Rosequist
- Jermaine Ross
- Joe Rowe
- Christian Rozeboom
- T. J. Rubley
- Conrad Rucker
- Doug Russell
- Leonard Russell
- Ralph Ruthstrom
- Craig Rutledge
- Jeff Rutledge
- Clifton Ryan
- Frank Ryan
- Dan Ryczek
- Brett Rypien
- Mark Rypien

== S ==
- Rodger Saffold
- Blaine Saipaia
- Greg Salas
- Glenell Sanders
- Cairo Santos
- Mekhi Sargent
- Rich Saul
- Ollie Savatsky
- Dwight Scales
- Mike Scarry
- Mike Schad
- Nate Schenker
- Derek Schouman
- Cody Schrader
- Roy Schuening
- Harry Schuh
- Elbie Schultz
- Gregg Schumacher
- Joe Scibelli
- Chuck Scott
- Darell Scott
- Nick Scott
- Rob Scribner
- Mike Scurlock
- Charlie Seabright
- Sam Seale
- Corey Sears
- Mike Sebastian
- Jason Sehorn
- Gene Selawski
- George Selvie
- Coty Sensabaugh
- Rafael Septién
- Mark Setterstrom
- Jeff Severson
- Harley Sewell
- Scott Shanle
- Carver Shannon
- Bob Shaw
- Glenn Shaw
- Nate Shaw
- Joe Shearin
- Duke Shelley
- Coleman Shelton
- Jacoby Shepherd
- Ashley Sheppard
- Rod Sherman
- Will Sherman
- Sam Shields
- Fred Shirey
- Rex Shiver
- Del Shofner
- Garrett Sickels
- Eric Sievers
- Rudy Sikich
- Don Simensen
- Milt Simington
- Jeff Simmons
- Bill Simpson
- Eugene Sims
- George Sims
- Mike Sims-Walker
- Greg Sinnott
- Stan Skoczen
- Ed Skoronski
- Jim Skow
- Ben Skowronek
- Matt Skura
- Jackie Slater
- Tony Slaton
- Sam Sloman
- Marty Slovak
- Torrance Small
- Tanzel Smart
- Branko Smilanich
- Anthony Smith
- Billy Ray Smith Sr.
- Bobby Smith
- Brian Smith
- Bruce Smith
- Chris Smith
- Christopher Smith
- Doug Smith
- Fernando Smith
- Gaylon Smith
- Jason Smith
- Justin Smith
- Larry Smith
- Lucious Smith
- Paul Smith
- Phil Smith
- Raonall Smith
- Ron Smith (born 1942)
- Ron Smith (born 1943)
- Ron Smith (born 1956)
- Sean Smith
- Shelley Smith
- Steve Smith
- Vernice Smith
- Vitamin Smith
- Xavier Smith
- Bill Smyth
- Jack Snow
- Bob Snyder
- Nick Sorensen
- Stephen Spach
- Vic Spadaccini
- Al Sparkman
- Omar Speights
- Cameron Spikes
- John St. Clair
- Jeremy Staat
- Zac Stacy
- Matthew Stafford
- Jerry Stalcup
- Frank Stams
- Derek Stanley
- Max Starks
- Art Statuto
- Bob Stein
- Kevin Stemke
- Scott Stephen
- Johnny Stephens
- Larry Stephens
- Dave Stephenson
- Todd Steussie
- Ralph Stevenson
- Darian Stewart
- Josaiah Stewart
- Michael Stewart
- Jim Stiger
- Gary Stills
- Fred Stokes
- Tim Stokes
- Pete Stoyanovich
- Troy Stradford
- Fred Strickland
- Woody Strode
- Mike Strofolino
- George Strugar
- Roy Stuart
- Pat Studstill
- Charlie Stukes
- Lorenzo Styles
- Steve Sucic
- Ndamukong Suh
- John Sullivan
- Ivory Sully
- Mickey Sutton
- Harland Svare
- Bill Swain
- Pete Swanson
- Joe Sweet
- Karl Sweetan

== T ==
- Diron Talbert
- Aqib Talib
- Bruce Tarbox
- Mosi Tatupu
- Corky Taylor
- Jason Taylor II
- Tom Taylor
- Travis Taylor
- Len Teeuws
- Scott Tercero
- Claude Terrell
- Pat Terrell
- Ben Thomas
- Bob Thomas
- Brayden Thomas
- Cam Thomas
- Chris Thomas
- Clendon Thomas
- Hollis Thomas
- J. T. Thomas
- Jemea Thomas
- Jewerl Thomas
- Keir Thomas
- Kelly Thomas
- Mike Thomas
- Pat Thomas
- Robert Thomas
- Rodney Thomas
- Zachary Thomas
- Bobby Thomason
- Anthony Thompson
- Carlos Thompson
- David Thompson
- Dominique Thompson
- Ernie Thompson
- Harry Thompson
- Wilfred Thorpe
- Cliff Thrift
- Adam Timmerman
- Carson Tinker
- Pisa Tinoisamoa
- Casey Tiumalu
- Tre'Vius Tomlinson
- Charlie Toogood
- Korey Toomer
- Nick Toon
- Keith Toston
- Dan Towler
- Austin Trammell
- Phil Trautwein
- Stephen Trejo
- Billy Truax
- Rex Tucker
- Ryan Tucker
- Wendell Tucker
- Dick Tuckey
- Navy Tuiasosopo
- Matt Turk
- Kyle Turley
- Jim Turner
- Kobie Turner
- Larry Turner
- Rob Turner
- Vernon Turner
- Rick Tuten
- Wendell Tyler
- Tim Tyrrell

== U ==
- Wayne Underwood
- Walt Uzdavinis

== V ==
- Vern Valdez
- Joe Valerio
- Norm Van Brocklin
- Norwood Vann
- Nick Vannett
- Zach VanValkenburg
- Frank Varrichione
- Vic Vasicek
- Justin Veltung
- Jared Verse
- Danny Villanueva
- Darius Vinnett
- David Vobora
- Andy Von Sonn

== W ==
- Billy Waddy
- Bill Wade
- Jonathan Wade
- Bobby Wagner
- Drew Wahlroos
- Aaron Walker
- Glen Walker
- Marquis Walker
- Tyrunn Walker
- Jackie Wallace
- Josh Wallace
- Ron Waller
- Brett Wallerstedt
- Lenny Walls
- Steve Walsh
- Shane Walton
- Alex Ward
- Phillip Ward
- Duane Wardlow
- Curt Warner
- Kurt Warner
- Brandon Washington
- Chauncey Washington
- James Washington
- Kenny Washington
- Bob Waterfield
- Rokevious Watkins
- Sammy Watkins
- Justin Watson
- Frank Wattelet
- Trey Watts
- Fred Weary
- Kayvon Webster
- Nsimba Webster
- Eric Weddle
- Thomas Welch
- Wes Welker
- Scott Wells
- Joe Wendryhoski
- Carson Wentz
- Pat West
- Stan West
- Walter West
- Ethan Westbrooks
- Greg Westbrooks
- Alberto White
- Charles White
- Dwayne White
- Lee White
- Leon White
- Russell White
- Tre'Davious White
- James Whitley
- Nat Whitmyer
- Jesse Whittenton
- Cary Whittingham
- Fred Whittingham
- Kyle Whittingham
- Jordan Whittington
- Andrew Whitworth
- Cody Wichmann
- Zach Wiegert
- John Wilbur
- Mike Wilcher
- Jeff Wilkins
- Roy Wilkins
- Terrence Wilkins
- Jerry Wilkinson
- Aeneas Williams
- Alonzo Williams
- Billy Williams
- Brandon Williams
- Cadillac Williams
- Chris Williams
- Clancy Williams
- Damian Williams
- Darious Williams
- Darrell Williams
- Donnie Williams
- Eric Williams
- Frank Williams
- Grant Williams
- Henry Williams
- Jabara Williams
- Jay Williams
- Jeff Williams
- Jerry Williams
- Joe Williams
- John Williams
- Jonah Williams
- Kyren Williams
- Mark Williams
- Mike Williams
- Nick Williams
- Roger Williams
- Roland Williams
- Sam Williams
- Steve Williams
- Travis Williams
- Greg Williamson
- Matt Willig
- Ben Wilson
- Gordon Wilson
- Jack Wilson
- Jim Wilson
- Johnny Wilson
- Karl Wilson
- Ramik Wilson
- Tommy Wilson
- Jim Winkler
- Joe Winkler
- Kelton Winston
- Grant Wistrom
- Ahkello Witherspoon
- Will Witherspoon
- Cory Withrow
- Dave Wohlabaugh
- Gregory Wojcik
- Ron Wolfley
- John Wolford
- Doug Woodlief
- Charles Woods
- Robert Woods
- Tony Woods
- Jim Worden
- Doug Worthington
- Tony Wragge
- Alexander Wright
- Alvin Wright
- Toby Wright
- Claude Wroten
- James Wyche

== Y ==
- Ray Yagiello
- Ron Yary
- Russ Yeast
- Brian Young
- Byron Young
- Charle Young
- Kenny Young
- Mike Young
- Robert Young
- Trevon Young
- George Youngblood
- Jack Youngblood
- Jim Youngblood
- Tank Younger

== Z ==
- Ed Zeman
- Tony Zendejas
- Ty Zentner
- Jeff Zgonina
- Jack Zilly
- Walt Zirinsky
- Dick Zoll
- Lou Zontini
- Greg Zuerlein
