= 1987 Los Angeles Rams season =

NFL team season

- Owner: Georgia Frontiere
- Head coach: John Robinson
- Home stadium: Anaheim Stadium

Results
- Record: 6–9
- Division place: 3rd NFC West
- Playoffs: Did not qualify
- Pro Bowlers: LCB Jerry Gray RG Dennis Harrah RT Jackie Slater C Doug Smith RB Charles White

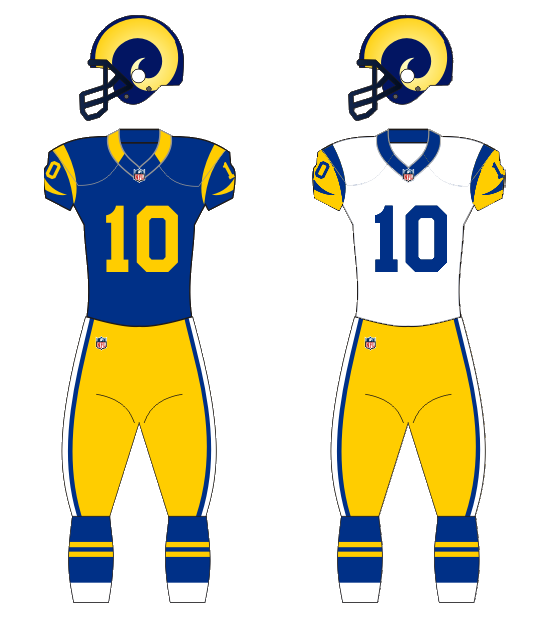
Uniforms worn by the 1987 Rams

The 1987 Los Angeles Rams season was the franchise's strike shortened 50th season in the National Football League, their 51st overall, and their 42nd in the Greater Los Angeles Area. The season saw the Rams attempting to improve on their 10–6 record from 1986 and make the playoffs for the 5th straight season. However, the Rams struggled right out the gate. In their first 2 games against the Houston Oilers and Minnesota Vikings, the Rams had 4th quarter leads and blew them. They led 13–0 in the 4th quarter at Houston and lost 20–16, while they led 16–14 at home against Minnesota and lost 21–16. The next week, a strike occurred which wiped out all week 3 games. As a result, their game at home against the Cincinnati Bengals was canceled. One week later, the Rams were thumped by the Saints 37–10 to start the season 0–3, their first such start since 1982, which was, ironically, also a season that saw a strike take place. The Rams finally got in the win column the next week, beating the Pittsburgh Steelers at home, 31–21.

However, the next week in Atlanta, the Rams lost another big lead, this time after leading 17–0 at halftime and 20–7 in the 4th quarter. This was followed by embarrassing losses to the Cleveland Browns (30–17), the arch-rival San Francisco 49ers (31–10), and the Saints again (31–14) to drop to 1–7, their worst start since 1965, when they started 1–9. However, the Rams then caught fire, beating the St. Louis Cardinals in St. Louis, 27–24, after trailing 24–14 in the 3rd quarter. The next week in Washington, the Rams outlasted the Washington Redskins on Monday Night Football 30–26, and it appeared as though the Rams were poised to get back in the playoff race. The win over Washington was followed by blowout wins over the Tampa Bay Buccaneers (35–3), Detroit Lions (37–6), and Atlanta Falcons (33–0) and the Rams were looking to make an improbable in-season turnaround. However, the next week against the Dallas Cowboys, the Rams lost 29–21 to eliminate them from the playoffs. The season ended with the Rams getting pummeled by the 49ers on the road, 48–0. Ultimately, the Rams finished the strike-shortened season 6–9 and missed the playoffs for the first time since 1982.

== Offseason ==
=== NFL draft ===
1987 Los Angeles Rams draft
Round	Pick	Player	Position	College	Notes
2	47	Donald Evans	Defensive end	Winston-Salem State	
3	76	Cliff Hicks	Cornerback	Oregon	
4	91	Doug Bartlett	Defensive tackle	Northern Illinois	
4	108	Larry Kelm	Linebacker	Texas A&M	
5	136	Scott Mersereau	Defensive tackle	Southern Connecticut	
6	166	John Embree	Tight end	Colorado	
8	213	Michael Stewart	Safety	Fresno State	
9	240	Tracy Ham	Running back	Georgia Southern	Signed with and played for the Edmonton Eskimos as a quarterback
10	272	David Smith	Linebacker	Northern Arizona	
12	326	Alonzo Williams	Running back	Colorado Mesa	
12	332	Fred Stokes	Defensive end	Georgia Southern	
Made roster * Made at least one Pro Bowl during career

== Personnel ==
=== Staff ===
1987 Los Angeles Rams staff
Front office: Owner/President – Georgia Frontiere; Vice president of finance – John Shaw; General counsel – Jay Zygmunt; Administrator of football operations – Jack Faulkner; Director of operations – Dick Beam; Director of player personnel – John Math; Head coaches: Head coach – John Robinson; Offensive coaches: Offensive coordinator – Ernie Zampese; Quarterbacks – Dick Coury; Running backs – Gil Haskell; Tight ends/wide receivers – Norv Turner; Offensive line – Hudson Houck	Defensive coaches: Defensive coordinator/inside linebackers – Fritz Shurmur; Defensive line – Marv Goux; Assistant defensive line – Larry Brooks; Outside linebackers – Fred Whittingham; Defensive backs – Steve Shafer; Special teams coaches: Special teams – Artie Gigantino

=== NFL replacement players ===
After the league decided to use replacement players during the NFLPA strike, the following team was assembled:

1987 Los Angeles Rams replacement roster
Quarterbacks: 4 Robert Frasco; 8 Steve Dils; 9 Bernard Quarles; Running backs: 31 Alonzo Williams; 32 Cullen Bryant; 33 Charles White; 34 Dwaine Wilson; 35 Jon Francis; 39 William Stone; 42 Casey Tiumalu; 44 Mike Guman; Wide receivers: 82 Bernard Henry; 14 Ricky Martin; 17 Steve Marks; 18 Brian Coushay; 81 Stacey Mobley; 88 Phil Smith; 89 Samuel Johnson; Tight ends: 38 Dan Noble; 83 James McDonald; 84 Malcolm Moore	Offensive linemen: 51 Chris Matau; 62 Tom Taylor; 63 Hank Goebel; 64 Greg Sinnott; 68 Navy Tuiasosopo; 72 Tom Cox; 73 Kelly Thomas; 76 Joe Murray; Defensive linemen: 69 Greg Meisner; 70 Tom Hensley; 76 Shelby Nevens; 79 Suge Knight; 90 Jim Crane; 90 Sherman Nevens; 90 Gregory Sims; 95 Dennis Edwards; 97 Chris Pacheco; 98 Shawn Miller; 99 Alvin Wright	Linebackers: 59 Cary Whittingham; 57 Kyle Whittingham; 91 Kyle Borland; 92 Jim Kalafat; 94 Danny Lee Clark; 96 Neil Hope; Defensive backs: 21 Nolan Cromwell; 26 Gerald Daniels; 29 Kevin Dickson; 36 Kirby Jackson; 37 Reggie Richardson; 41 Ed Zeman; 43 Greg Williamson; 46 Holbert Johnson; 46 Jerome Tyler; 48 Craig Rutledge; Special teams: 1 Mike Lansford K; 2 Don Shafer K; 5 Dale Hatcher P; 6 John Misko P

=== Roster ===
1987 Los Angeles Rams roster
Quarterbacks (QB): 8 Steve Dils; 11 Jim Everett; 12 Hugh Millen; Running backs (RB): 34 Donald Evans; 44 Mike Guman; 38 Lakei Heimuli; 35 Jon Francis; 32 Tim Tyrrell; 33 Charles White; Wide receivers (WR): 89 Ron Brown; 80 Henry Ellard; 83 Kevin House; 88 Mike Young; Tight ends (TE): 84 Greg Baty; 81 David Hill; 86 Damone Johnson	Offensive linemen (OL): 64 Robert Cox T; 60 Dennis Harrah G; 67 Duval Love G; 66 Tom Newberry G; 75 Irv Pankey T; 76 Mike Schad G; 56 Doug Smith C; 78 Jackie Slater T; 61 Tony Slaton C; Defensive linemen (DL): 71 Reggie Doss DE; 77 Gary Jeter DE; 69 Greg Meisner NT; 98 Shawn Miller DE; 93 Doug Reed DE; 65 Fred Stokes DE; 99 Alvin Wright NT	Linebackers (LB): 92 Richard Brown ILB; 50 Jim Collins ILB; 55 Carl Ekern ILB; 91 Kevin Greene OLB; 52 Larry Kelm ILB; 58 Mel Owens OLB; 51 Norwood Vann OLB; 54 Mike Wilcher OLB; Defensive backs (DB): 21 Nolan Cromwell FS; 25 Jerry Gray CB; 28 Cliff Hicks CB; 47 LeRoy Irvin CB; 23 Michael Stewart SS; 49 Mickey Sutton CB; 41 Frank Wattelet FS; Special teams (ST): 5 Dale Hatcher P; 1 Mike Lansford K; 90 Mike McDonald LS	Reserve: 57 Doug Bartlett DE (IR); 42 Greg Bell RB (IR); 94 Kyle Borland LB (IR); 95 Jim Blyrne DE (IR); 87 Jon Embree TE (IR); 20 Johnnie Johnson S (IR); 59 Mark Jerue LB (IR); 24 Buford McGee FB (IR); 22 Vince Newsome S (IR); —- Tim Ruiz G (IR); -- Jeff Walker T/G (IR); Rookies in italics

== Regular season ==
On October 31, 1987, the Los Angeles Rams traded Eric Dickerson to the Indianapolis Colts in a three team trade involving the Buffalo Bills. The Rams sent Dickerson to the Colts for six draft choices and two players. Buffalo obtained the rights to Cornelius Bennett from Indianapolis. Buffalo sent running back Greg Bell and three draft choices to the Rams, while Indianapolis added Owen Gill and three of their own draft picks to complete the deal with the Rams.

Former Heisman Trophy winner Charles White would become the starting running back. The 1987 season would be his finest year as a pro, rushing for a league-leading 1,387 yards and 11 touchdowns, which earned him a Pro Bowl selection and the NFL Comeback Player of the Year Award.

On November 23, 1987, linebacker Mike Wilcher recovered Doug Williams fumble and ran it back it 35 yards for a touchdown. It was Wilcher's only touchdown in the NFL.

Erik Kramer's 3 passing touchdown performance against the Rams on October 18, 1987, was the last three-touchdown game by an undrafted free agent rookie quarterback until Matt McGloin accomplished the feat for the Oakland Raiders against the Houston Texans on November 17, 2013.

=== Schedule ===
Week	Date	Opponent	Result	Record	Venue	Attendance
1	September 13	at Houston Oilers	**L** 16–20	0–1	Houston Astrodome	33,186
2	September 20	Minnesota Vikings	**L** 16–21	0–2	Anaheim Stadium	63,367
–	September 27	Cincinnati Bengals	canceled	0–2	Anaheim Stadium	
3	October 4	at **New Orleans Saints**	**L** 10–37	0–3	Louisiana Superdome	29,745
4	October 11	Pittsburgh Steelers	**W** 31–21	1–3	Anaheim Stadium	20,219
5	October 18	at **Atlanta Falcons**	**L** 20–24	1–4	Atlanta–Fulton County Stadium	15,813
6	October 26	at Cleveland Browns	**L** 17–30	1–5	Cleveland Municipal Stadium	76,933
7	November 1	**San Francisco 49ers**	**L** 10–31	1–6	Anaheim Stadium	55,328
8	November 8	**New Orleans Saints**	**L** 14–31	1–7	Anaheim Stadium	43,379
9	November 15	at St. Louis Cardinals	**W** 27–24	2–7	Busch Memorial Stadium	27,730
10	November 23	at Washington Redskins	**W** 30–26	3–7	RFK Stadium	53,614
11	November 29	Tampa Bay Buccaneers	**W** 35–3	4–7	Anaheim Stadium	45,188
12	December 6	at Detroit Lions	**W** 37–16	5–7	Pontiac Silverdome	33,413
13	December 13	**Atlanta Falcons**	**W** 33–0	6–7	Anaheim Stadium	43,310
14	December 21	Dallas Cowboys	**L** 21–29	6–8	Anaheim Stadium	60,700
15	December 27	at **San Francisco 49ers**	**L** 0–48	6–9	Candlestick Park	57,950
Note: Intra-division opponents are in **bold** text.

=== Standings ===
NFC West
	W	L	T	PCT	DIV	CONF	PF	PA	STK
San Francisco 49ers^{(1)}	13	2	0	.867	5–1	10–1	459	253	W6
New Orleans Saints^{(4)}	12	3	0	.800	4–1	8–3	426	283	W9
Los Angeles Rams	6	9	0	.400	1–5	5–7	317	361	L2
Atlanta Falcons	3	12	0	.200	1–4	3–8	205	436	L3

== Awards and honors ==
- Jerry Gray, NFC Pro Bowl selection
- Charles White, NFL Comeback Player of the Year
- Charles White, Pro Bowl selection
