= 1988 Los Angeles Rams season =

NFL team season

- Owner: Georgia Frontiere
- Head coach: John Robinson
- Offensive coordinator: Ernie Zampese
- Defensive coordinator: Fritz Shurmur
- Home stadium: Anaheim Stadium

Results
- Record: 10–6
- Division place: 2nd NFC West
- Playoffs: Lost Wild Card Playoffs (at Vikings) 17–28

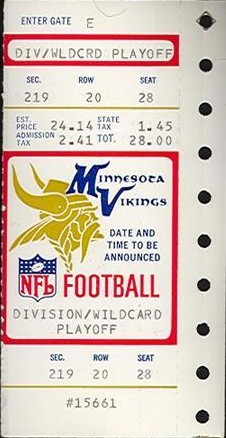
1988 NFC Wild Card Game

The 1988 Los Angeles Rams season was the franchise's 51st season in the National Football League, their 52nd overall, and their 43rd in the Greater Los Angeles Area. The team improved on a disappointing 6–9 record the previous year, going 10–6 and qualifying as a Wild Card before losing to the Minnesota Vikings 28–17 in the NFC Wild Card game.

== Offseason ==
=== NFL draft ===
1988 Los Angeles Rams draft
Round	Pick	Player	Position	College	Notes
1	14	Gaston Green	Running back	UCLA	
1	20	Aaron Cox	Wide receiver	Arizona State	
2	35	Anthony Newman	Safety	Oregon	
2	46	Flipper Anderson	Wide receiver	UCLA	
2	47	Fred Strickland	Linebacker	Purdue	
3	82	Mike Piel	Defensive end	Illinois	
5	117	Robert Delpino	Running back	Missouri	
5	137	James Washington	Safety	UCLA	
6	147	Keith "End Zone" Jones	Running back	Nebraska	
6	165	Jeff Knapton	Defensive tackle	Wyoming	
8	201	Darryl Franklin	Wide receiver	Washington	
9	231	Pat Foster	Defensive tackle	Montana	
10	258	R. C. Mullin	Offensive tackle	Southwestern Louisiana	
12	333	Jeff Beathard	Wide receiver	Southern Oregon	1988 Mr. Irrelevant
Made roster * Made at least one Pro Bowl during career

== Personnel ==
=== Staff ===
1988 Los Angeles Rams staff
Front office: Owner/President – Georgia Frontiere; Vice president of finance – John Shaw; General counsel – Jay Zygmunt; Administrator of football operations – Jack Faulkner; Director of operations – Dick Beam; Director of player personnel – John Math; Head coaches: Head coach – John Robinson; Offensive coaches: Offensive coordinator – Ernie Zampese; Quarterbacks – Dick Coury; Running backs – Gil Haskell; Tight ends/wide receivers – Norv Turner; Offensive line – Hudson Houck	Defensive coaches: Defensive coordinator/inside linebackers – Fritz Shurmur; Defensive line – Marv Goux; Assistant defensive line – Larry Brooks; Outside linebackers – Fred Whittingham; Defensive backs – Steve Shafer; Special teams coaches: Special teams – Artie Gigantino

=== Roster ===
1988 Los Angeles Rams roster
Quarterbacks (QB): 11 Jim Everett; 9 Mark Herrmann; Running backs (RB): 42 Greg Bell; 39 Robert Delpino KR; 30 Gaston Green KR; 44 Mike Guman; 24 Buford McGee; 32 Tim Tyrrell; 33 Charles White; Wide receivers (WR): 83 Flipper Anderson; 89 Ron Brown KR; 84 Aaron Cox; 80 Henry Ellard PR; Tight ends (TE): 81 Pete Holohan; 86 Damone Johnson; 82 Eric Sievers	Offensive linemen (OL): 72 Robert Jenkins T; 67 Duval Love G; 66 Tom Newberry G; 75 Irv Pankey T; 76 Mike Schad G; 78 Jackie Slater T; 61 Tony Slaton C/G; 56 Doug Smith C; Defensive linemen (DL): 77 Gary Jeter DE; 69 Greg Meisner NT; 98 Shawn Miller DE; 93 Doug Reed DE; 99 Alvin Wright NT	Linebackers (LB): 50 Jim Collins ILB; 55 Carl Ekern ILB; 51 Brett Faryniarz OLB; 91 Kevin Greene OLB; 52 Larry Kelm ILB; 53 Fred Strickland ILB; 54 Mike Wilcher OLB; Defensive backs (DB): 25 Jerry Gray CB; 28 Cliff Hicks CB; 47 LeRoy Irvin CB; 20 Johnnie Johnson FS; 26 Anthony Newman CB; 23 Michael Stewart SS; 49 Mickey Sutton CB; 37 James Washington FS; Special teams (ST): 5 Dale Hatcher P; 1 Mike Lansford K; 90 Mike McDonald LS	Practice squad none Reserve: 87 Jon Embree TE (IR); 59 Mark Jerue LB (IR); -- Keith Jones RB (IR); -- R.C. Mullin T (IR); 22 Vince Newsome S (IR); 58 Mel Owens LB (IR); 95 Mike Piel DE (IR); 65 Fred Stokes DE (IR); 88 Mike Young WR (IR); 47 active, 9 inactive Rookies in italics

== Regular season ==
1988 Team Starters

Offense

11 Jim Everett            QB
42 Greg Bell              RB
24 Buford McGee           FB
80 Henry Ellard           WR
84 Aaron Cox              WR
86 Damone Johnson         TE

75 Irv Pankey             LT
66 Tom Newberry           LG
56 Doug Smith             C
67 Duval Love             RG
78 Jackie Slater          RT

Defense

93 Doug Reed              LDE
99 Alvin Wright           NT
98 Shawn Miller           RDE

91 Kevin Greene           LB
55 Carl Ekern             LB
59 Mark Jerue             LB
54 Mike Wilcher           LB

25 Jerry Gray             CB
47 LeRoy Irvin            CB
23 Michael Stewart        SS
20 Johnnie Johnson        FS

Kicking Team

1 Mike Lansford           K
3 Rich Camarillo          P
28 Cliff Hicks            PR
89 Ron Brown              KR

=== Schedule ===
Week	Date	Opponent	Result	Record	Venue	Attendance
1	September 4	at Green Bay Packers	**W** 34–7	1–0	Lambeau Field	53,769
2	September 11	Detroit Lions	**W** 17–10	2–0	Anaheim Stadium	46,262
3	September 18	at Los Angeles Raiders	**W** 22–17	3–0	Los Angeles Memorial Coliseum	84,870
4	September 25	at New York Giants	**W** 45–31	4–0	Giants Stadium	75,617
5	October 2	Phoenix Cardinals	**L** 27–41	4–1	Anaheim Stadium	49,830
6	October 9	at **Atlanta Falcons**	**W** 33–0	5–1	Atlanta–Fulton County Stadium	30,852
7	October 16	**San Francisco 49ers**	**L** 21–24	5–2	Anaheim Stadium	65,450
8	October 23	Seattle Seahawks	**W** 31–10	6–2	Anaheim Stadium	57,033
9	October 30	at **New Orleans Saints**	**W** 12–10	7–2	Louisiana Superdome	68,238
10	November 6	at Philadelphia Eagles	**L** 24–30	7–3	Veterans Stadium	65,624
11	November 13	**New Orleans Saints**	**L** 10–14	7–4	Anaheim Stadium	63,305
12	November 20	San Diego Chargers	**L** 24–38	7–5	Anaheim Stadium	45,462
13	November 27	at Denver Broncos	**L** 24–35	7–6	Mile High Stadium	74,141
14	December 5	Chicago Bears	**W** 23–3	8–6	Anaheim Stadium	65,579
15	December 11	**Atlanta Falcons**	**W** 22–7	9–6	Anaheim Stadium	42,828
16	December 18	at **San Francisco 49ers**	**W** 38–16	10–6	Candlestick Park	62,444
Note: Intra-division opponents are in **bold** text.

=== Season summary ===
==== Week 4 ====
Team	1	2	3	4	Total
• Rams	7	21	7	10	45
Giants	0	10	14	7	31

- Date: September 25
- Location: Giants Stadium
- Game start: 4:00 p.m. EST
- Game weather: 64 °F (17.8 °C); wind 11 miles per hour (18 km/h; 9.6 kn)
- Referee: Johnny Grier
- Television network: CBS

Scoring summary
Q1	LA	Holohan 14 yard pass from Everett (Lansford kick)	LA 7–0
Q2	NYG	Allegre 34 yard field goal	LA 7–3
Q2	LA	Delpino 5 yard pass from Everett (Lansford kick)	LA 14–3
Q2	LA	Bell 2 yard run (Lansford kick)	LA 21–3
Q2	LA	Cox 69 yard pass from Everett (Lansford kick)	LA 28–3
Q2	NYG	Ingram 9 yard pass from Simms (Allegre kick)	LA 28–10
Q3	NYG	Johnson 33 yard interception return (Allegre kick)	LA 28–17
Q3	LA	Bell 2 yard pass from Everett (Lansford kick)	LA 35–17
Q3	NYG	Morris 3 yard run (Allegre kick)	LA 35–24
Q4	LA	Lansford 41 yard field goal	LA 38–24
Q4	LA	Ellard 41 yard pass from Everett (Lansford kick)	LA 45–24
Q4	NYG	Bavaro 16 yard pass from Simms (Allegre kick)	LA 45–31

=== Standings ===
NFC West
	W	L	T	PCT	DIV	CONF	PF	PA	STK
San Francisco 49ers^{(2)}	10	6	0	.625	4–2	8–4	369	294	L1
Los Angeles Rams^{(5)}	10	6	0	.625	4–2	8–4	407	293	W3
New Orleans Saints	10	6	0	.625	3–3	6–6	312	283	W1
Atlanta Falcons	5	11	0	.313	1–5	4–8	244	315	L3

== Playoffs ==
Round	Date	Opponent (seed)	Result	Record	Venue	Attendance
Wildcard	December 26	at Minnesota Vikings (4)	L 17–28	0–1	Hubert H. Humphrey Metrodome	57,666

== Awards and records ==
- Greg Bell, NFL Leader, Touchdowns, 31 TD's
- Greg Bell, NFL Comeback Player of the Year
- Jerry Gray, NFC Pro Bowl selection
- Pete Holohan, Franchise Record, most receptions by a tight end (59)

== See also ==
Other Anaheim–based teams in 1988

- California Angels (Anaheim Stadium)
  - 1988 California Angels season
