= 1990 Los Angeles Rams season =

NFL team season

- Owner: Georgia Frontiere
- Head coach: John Robinson
- Home stadium: Anaheim Stadium

Results
- Record: 5–11
- Division place: 3rd NFC West
- Playoffs: Did not qualify

Uniform
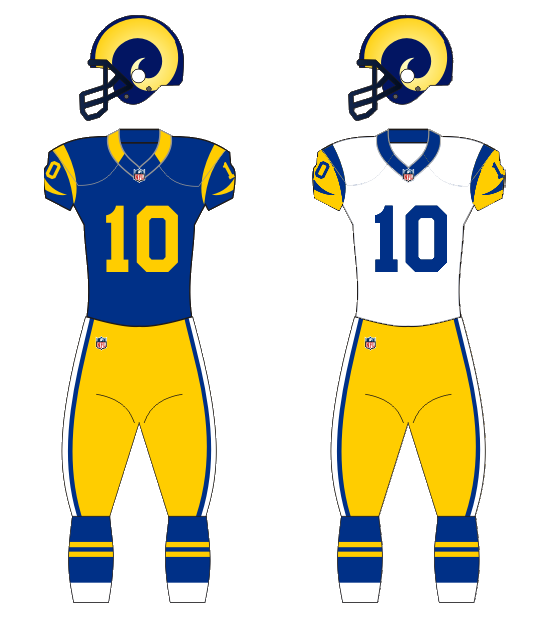

The 1990 Los Angeles Rams season was the team's 53rd year with the National Football League and 45th season in Los Angeles. The Rams, playing in Anaheim Stadium, looked to improve on their 11–5 season from 1989 and make the playoffs for the third consecutive season and be possible contenders for the Super Bowl. However, the Rams would struggle all season, starting 1–4 before winning two of their next three games before losing their next two as they dipped to a 3–7 record. After a win over Cleveland, the Rams upset the 49ers 28–17 in San Francisco to improve to 5–7. However, this would be perhaps the only good highlight of the season for the Rams. After defeating the 49ers, they ended the season on a 4 game losing streak and finished with a disappointing 5–11 record, missing the playoffs for the first time since 1987 and only the fourth time since 1972. This would however be their last win over the 49ers until the 1999 season. On November 11, 1990, Marcus Dupree made his NFL debut against the New York Giants.

== Offseason ==
=== NFL draft ===
1990 Los Angeles Rams draft
Round	Pick	Player	Position	College	Notes
1	23	Bern Brostek	Center	Washington	
2	49	Pat Terrell	Defensive back	Notre Dame	
3	78	Latin Berry	Running back	Oregon	
6	161	Tim Stallworth	Wide receiver	Washington State	
7	190	Kent Elmore	Punter	Tennessee–Chattanooga	
8	198	Ray Savage	Linebacker	Virginia	
8	216	Elbert Crawford	Center	Arkansas	
9	245	Tony Lomack	Wide receiver	Florida	
10	272	Steve Bates	Defensive end	James Madison	
11	301	Bill Goldberg	Defensive tackle	Georgia	
12	328	David Lang	Running back	Northern Arizona	
Made roster

=== Undrafted free agents ===
1990 undrafted free agents of note
Player	Position	College
Theo Adams	Tackle	Hawaii
General Brown	Defensive tackle	Savannah State
Anthony Bruno	Defensive tackle	Cal State Hayward
David Caylor	Kicker	Long Beach State
David Eldridge	Running back	Arizona
Rick Johnson	Quarterback	Southern Illinois
Dwayne Jones	Defensive Back	California
Tony Manu	Linebacker	Idaho State
David Ortega	Linebacker	California
William Pellum	Wide receiver	Washington State
James Price	Tight end	Stanford
Fred Whittingham	Running back	BYU

== Personnel ==
=== Staff ===
1990 Los Angeles Rams staff
Front office: Owner/President – Georgia Frontiere; Executive Vice President – John Shaw; Senior Vice President – Jay Zygmunt; Administrator of Football Operations – Jack Faulkner; Director of Player Personnel – John Math; Head coaches: Head Coach – John Robinson; Offensive coaches: Offensive Coordinator – Ernie Zampese; Quarterbacks – Dick Coury; Running Backs – Gil Haskell; Tight Ends/Wide Receivers – Norv Turner; Offensive Line – Hudson Houck	Defensive coaches: Defensive Coordinator – Fritz Shurmur; Defensive Line – Marv Goux; Assistant Defensive Line – Larry Brooks; Linebackers – Fred Whittingham; Assistant Linebackers – Artie Gigantino; Defensive Secondary – Steve Shafer; Special teams coaches: Special Teams – Jairo Penaranda; Strength and conditioning: Strength and Conditioning – Garrett Giemont

=== Roster ===
1990 Los Angeles Rams roster
Quarterbacks (QB): 11 Jim Everett; 16 Chuck Long; Running backs (RB): 39 Robert Delpino KR; 34 Marcus Dupree; 43 Cleveland Gary; 44 Gaston Green KR; 24 Buford McGee FB; Wide receivers (WR): 83 Flipper Anderson; 84 Aaron Cox; 80 Henry Ellard; 89 Derrick Faison; Tight ends (TE): 88 Pat Carter; 81 Pete Holohan; 86 Damone Johnson	Offensive linemen (OL): 61 Bern Brostek C/G; 72 Robert Jenkins T; 67 Duval Love G; 71 Joe Milinichik G; 66 Tom Newberry G; 75 Irv Pankey T; 78 Jackie Slater T; 56 Doug Smith C; Defensive linemen (DL): 70 Bill Hawkins DE; 95 Mike Piel DE; 93 Doug Reed DE; 96 Brian Smith DE; 99 Alvin Wright NT	Linebackers (LB): 57 George Bethune OLB; 59 Paul Butcher ILB; 51 Brett Faryniarz OLB; 91 Kevin Greene OLB; 52 Larry Kelm ILB; 97 Bruce Klosterman ILB; 50 Frank Stams ILB; 54 Mike Wilcher OLB; Defensive backs (DB): 42 Latin Berry CB/KR; 25 Jerry Gray CB; 20 Darryl Henley CB/PR; 48 Bobby Humphery CB; 26 Anthony Newman FS; 22 Vince Newsome FS; 23 Michael Stewart SS; 37 Pat Terrell SS; Special teams (ST): 8 Keith English P; 1 Mike Lansford K; 90 Mike McDonald LS	Practice squad: 87 Richard Ashe TE; 98 Derrick Carr DE; 82 Tony Lomack WR; -- Jim Price TE; -- Fred Whittingham RB; Reserve: 92 Greg Clark LB (IR); -- Rodney Lossow C (IR); 53 Fred Strickland LB (IR); 30 Mickey Sutton CB/PR (IR); 46 active, 4 inactive, 5 practice squad Rookies in italics

== Regular season ==
=== Schedule ===
Week	Date	Opponent	Result	Record	Venue	Attendance
1	September 9	at Green Bay Packers	**L** 24–36	0–1	Lambeau Field	57,685
2	September 16	at Tampa Bay Buccaneers	**W** 35–14	1–1	Tampa Stadium	59,705
3	September 23	Philadelphia Eagles	**L** 21–27	1–2	Anaheim Stadium	63,644
4	Bye					
5	October 7	Cincinnati Bengals	**L** 31–34	1–3	Anaheim Stadium	62,619
6	October 14	at Chicago Bears	**L** 9–38	1–4	Soldier Field	59,383
7	October 21	**Atlanta Falcons**	**W** 44–24	2–4	Anaheim Stadium	54,761
8	October 29	at Pittsburgh Steelers	**L** 10–41	2–5	Three Rivers Stadium	56,466
9	November 4	Houston Oilers	**W** 17–13	3–5	Anaheim Stadium	52,628
10	November 11	New York Giants	**L** 7–31	3–6	Anaheim Stadium	64,632
11	November 18	Dallas Cowboys	**L** 21–24	3–7	Anaheim Stadium	58,589
12	November 25	at **San Francisco 49ers**	**W** 28–17	4–7	Candlestick Park	62,633
13	December 2	at Cleveland Browns	**W** 38–23	5–7	Cleveland Municipal Stadium	61,981
14	December 9	**New Orleans Saints**	**L** 20–24	5–8	Anaheim Stadium	56,864
15	December 17	**San Francisco 49ers**	**L** 10–26	5–9	Anaheim Stadium	65,619
16	December 23	at **Atlanta Falcons**	**L** 13–20	5–10	Atlanta–Fulton County Stadium	30,021
17	December 31	at **New Orleans Saints**	**L** 17–20	5–11	Louisiana Superdome	68,647
Note: Intra-division opponents are in **bold** text.

=== Game summaries ===
==== Week 1: at Green Bay Packers ====
Week 1: Los Angeles Rams at Green Bay Packers

Quarter	1	2	3	4	Total
**Rams**	7	7	3	7	**24**
Packers	0	17	3	16	**36**

at Lambeau Field, Green Bay, Wisconsin

- Date: September 9, 1990
- Game time: 1:00 p.m. CST
- Game weather: Overcast, 68 °F (20 °C)
- TV announcers (CBS): Verne Lundquist and John Madden

Game information

**First quarter**

**Second quarter**

**Third quarter**

**Fourth quarter**

Top passers

- RAM – Jim Everett – 24/40, 340 yards, 2 TD, 2 INT
- GB – Anthony Dilweg – 20/32, 248 yards, 3 TD

Top rushers

- RAM – Curt Warner – 13 rushes, 47 yards, TD
- GB – Vince Workman – 5 rushes, 40 yards

Top receivers

- RAM – Flipper Anderson – 5 receptions, 128 yards, TD
- GB – Jeff Query – 2 receptions, 66 yards, TD

=== Standings ===
NFC West
	W	L	T	PCT	DIV	CONF	PF	PA	STK
^{(1)} San Francisco 49ers	14	2	0	.875	4–2	10–2	353	239	W1
^{(6)} New Orleans Saints	8	8	0	.500	4–2	6–6	274	275	W2
Los Angeles Rams	5	11	0	.313	2–4	3–9	345	412	L4
Atlanta Falcons	5	11	0	.313	2–4	3–9	348	365	W2

== See also ==
Other Anaheim–based teams in 1990

- California Angels (Anaheim Stadium)
  - 1990 California Angels season
