= 1992 Los Angeles Rams season =

NFL team season

- Owner: Georgia Frontiere
- Head coach: Chuck Knox
- Offensive coordinator: Ernie Zampese
- Defensive coordinator: George Dyer
- Home stadium: Anaheim Stadium

Results
- Record: 6–10
- Division place: 4th NFC West
- Playoffs: Did not qualify

Uniform
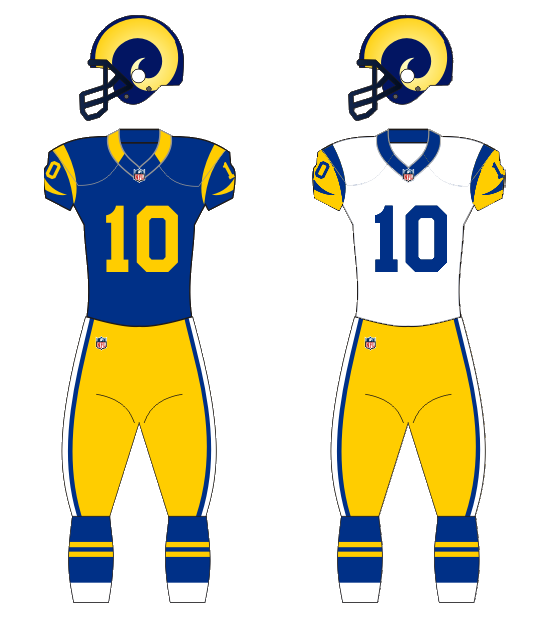

The 1992 Los Angeles Rams season was the team's 55th year with the National Football League and the 47th season in Los Angeles. In a scheduling quirk, the Rams' first four opponents were all AFC East teams. The Rams' final twelve games were against only NFC teams.

According to Football Outsiders, the 1992 Rams had the second-worst run-defense they had ever tracked. The Rams allowed 383 points, the second most in the league in 1992. The Rams were also second-worst in the league in total allowed yards (5,523), allowed rushing yards (2,230), and yards per rushing attempt (4.8).

The Rams' first four games were vs. the AFC East, the first time a team played four inter-conference games to begin a season since the AFL-NFL merger. This was repeated two years later by the Kansas City Chiefs.

== Offseason ==
=== NFL draft ===
1992 Los Angeles Rams draft
Round	Pick	Player	Position	College	Notes
1	3	Sean Gilbert *	Defensive tackle	Pittsburgh	
2	30	Steve Israel	Cornerback	Pittsburgh	
3	57	Marc Boutte	Defensive tackle	LSU	
3	60	Todd Kinchen	Wide receiver	LSU	
4	87	Shawn Harper	Offensive tackle	Indiana	
5	114	Chris Crooms	Safety	Texas A&M	
6	144	Joe Campbell	Running back	Middle Tennessee	
7	171	Darryl Ashmore	Offensive tackle	Northwestern	
8	198	Ricky Jones	Quarterback	Alabama State	
9	228	T. J. Rubley	Quarterback	Tulsa	
10	255	Tim Lester	Running back	Eastern Kentucky	
11	281	Brian Townsend	Linebacker	Michigan	
11	282	Brian Thomas	Wide receiver	Southern	
12	312	Kelvin Harris	Center	Miami (FL)	
Made roster * Made at least one Pro Bowl during career

== Personnel ==
=== Staff ===
1992 Los Angeles Rams staff
Front office: Owner/president – Georgia Frontiere; Executive vice-president – John Shaw; Senior vice-president – Jay Zygmunt; Administrator of football operations – Jack Faulkner; Director of player personnel – John Becker; Head coaches: Vice-president/head coach – Chuck Knox; Assistant head coach/safeties – Joe Vitt; Offensive coaches: Offensive coordinator – Ernie Zampese; Quarterbacks – Ted Tollner; Running backs – Chick Harris; Wide receivers – Milt Jackson; Tight ends – Howard Tippett; Offensive line – Jim Erkenbeck; Offensive assistant – Mike Martz	Defensive coaches: Defensive coordinator/defensive line – George Dyer; Linebackers – Dick Selcer; Defensive backs – Rod Perry; Special teams coaches: Special teams – Howard Tippett; Strength and conditioning: Strength and conditioning – Chris Clausen

=== Roster ===
1992 Los Angeles Rams roster
Quarterbacks (QB): 11 Jim Everett; 14 Mike Pagel; 12 T. J. Rubley; Running backs (RB): 39 Robert Delpino FB; 43 Cleveland Gary; 38 David Lang; 34 Tim Lester; 32 Anthony Thompson; Wide receivers (WR): 83 Flipper Anderson; 89 Jeff Chadwick; 80 Henry Ellard; 22 Emile Harry; 81 Todd Kinchen; Tight ends (TE): 88 Pat Carter; 82 Travis McNeal; 87 Jim Price	Offensive linemen (OL): 61 Bern Brostek C; 72 Robert Jenkins T; 71 Joe Milinichik G; 66 Tom Newberry G; 69 Jeff Pahukoa G; 64 Gerald Perry T; 78 Jackie Slater T; Defensive linemen (DL): 96 Marc Boutte DT; 90 Sean Gilbert DT; 95 Mike Piel DE; 98 Warren Powers DE; 97 Gerald Robinson DE; 76 Robert Young DE	Linebackers (LB): 91 Kevin Greene OLB; 52 Larry Kelm MLB; 58 Roman Phifer OLB; 50 Scott Stephen OLB; 53 Fred Strickland MLB; 55 Leon White OLB; Defensive backs (DB): 28 Robert Bailey CB; 25 Chris Crooms SS; 42 Courtney Griffin CB; 20 Darryl Henley CB; 31 Steve Israel CB; 41 Todd Lyght CB; 26 Anthony Newman SS; 23 Michael Stewart FS; 37 Pat Terrell FS; Special teams (ST): 17 Don Bracken P; 51 Blair Bush LS; 10 Tony Zendejas K	Practice squad: 77 Darryl Ashmore T; 73 Shawn Harper T; 57 Thomas Homco LB; Reserve: 59 Paul Butcher LB (IR); 84 Aaron Cox WR (IR); 70 Bill Hawkins DE (IR); 86 Damone Johnson TE (IR); 27 Sammy Lilly CB (IR); 92 David Rocker DT (IR); 47 active, 6 inactive, 3 practice squad Rookies in italics

== Regular season ==
=== Schedule ===
Week	Date	Opponent	Result	Record	Venue	Attendance
1	September 6	at Buffalo Bills	**L** 7–40	0–1	Rich Stadium	79,001
2	September 13	New England Patriots	**W** 14–0	1–1	Anaheim Stadium	40,402
3	September 20	at Miami Dolphins	**L** 10–26	1–2	Joe Robbie Stadium	55,945
4	September 27	New York Jets	**W** 18–10	2–2	Anaheim Stadium	42,005
5	October 4	at **San Francisco 49ers**	**L** 24–27	2–3	Candlestick Park	63,071
6	October 11	at **New Orleans Saints**	**L** 10–13	2–4	Louisiana Superdome	68,591
7	October 18	New York Giants	**W** 38–17	3–4	Anaheim Stadium	53,541
8	Bye					
9	November 1	at **Atlanta Falcons**	**L** 28–30	3–5	Georgia Dome	62,168
10	November 8	Phoenix Cardinals	**L** 14–20	3–6	Anaheim Stadium	40,788
11	November 15	at Dallas Cowboys	**W** 27–23	4–6	Texas Stadium	63,690
12	November 22	**San Francisco 49ers**	**L** 10–27	4–7	Anaheim Stadium	65,858
13	November 29	Minnesota Vikings	**L** 17–31	4–8	Anaheim Stadium	54,831
14	December 6	at Tampa Bay Buccaneers	**W** 31–27	5–8	Tampa Stadium	38,387
15	December 13	**New Orleans Saints**	**L** 14–37	5–9	Anaheim Stadium	47,355
16	December 20	at Green Bay Packers	**L** 13–28	5–10	Lambeau Field	57,796
17	December 27	**Atlanta Falcons**	**W** 38–27	6–10	Anaheim Stadium	37,706
Note: Intra-division opponents are in **bold** text.

=== Standings ===
NFC West
	W	L	T	PCT	DIV	CONF	PF	PA	STK
^{(1)} San Francisco 49ers	14	2	0	.875	6–0	11–1	431	236	W8
^{(4)} New Orleans Saints	12	4	0	.750	4–2	9–3	330	202	W1
Atlanta Falcons	6	10	0	.375	1–5	4–8	327	414	L2
Los Angeles Rams	6	10	0	.375	1–5	4–8	313	383	W1

== See also ==
Other Anaheim–based teams in 1992

- California Angels (Anaheim Stadium)
  - 1992 California Angels season
