= List of Northern Illinois Huskies in the NFL draft =

This is a list of NIU Huskies football players in the NFL draft.

== Key ==
| B | Back | K | Kicker | NT | Nose tackle |
| C | Center | LB | Linebacker | FB | Fullback |
| DB | Defensive back | P | Punter | HB | Halfback |
| DE | Defensive end | QB | Quarterback | WR | Wide receiver |
| DT | Defensive tackle | RB | Running back | G | Guard |
| E | End | T | Offensive tackle | TE | Tight end |

== Selections ==
| Year | Round | Pick | Overall | Player | Team | Position |
|---|---|---|---|---|---|---|
| 1948 | 17 | 5 | 150 | Larry Brink | Los Angeles Rams | E |
| 1952 | 19 | 10 | 227 | Frank Cahill | New York Giants | E |
| 1967 | 10 | 21 | 258 | Leigh Gilbert | Baltimore Colts | TE |
| 1968 | 16 | 15 | 423 | Tom Rosenow | San Francisco 49ers | DT |
| 1969 | 3 | 12 | 64 | John Spilis | Green Bay Packers | WR |
| 1972 | 8 | 18 | 200 | Tom Wittum | San Francisco 49ers | P |
| 1973 | 5 | 24 | 128 | Larry Clark | Pittsburgh Steelers | LB |
| 1973 | 7 | 22 | 178 | Willie Hatter | Miami Dolphins | WR |
| 1973 | 9 | 3 | 211 | John Nokes | Philadelphia Eagles | LB |
| 1974 | 6 | 25 | 155 | Mark Kellar | Minnesota Vikings | RB |
| 1974 | 14 | 16 | 354 | Rich Marks | Denver Broncos | DB |
| 1975 | 11 | 20 | 280 | Jerry Latin | St. Louis Cardinals | RB |
| 1976 | 6 | 11 | 167 | Bob Gregolunas | Kansas City Chiefs | LB |
| 1976 | 12 | 14 | 333 | Jerry Golsteyn | New York Giants | QB |
| 1976 | 15 | 8 | 411 | Jerry Meyers | Chicago Bears | DE |
| 1977 | 5 | 26 | 138 | Ken Moore | Minnesota Vikings | TE |
| 1980 | 8 | 22 | 215 | Randy Clark | Chicago Bears | C |
| 1981 | 9 | 8 | 229 | Jim Hannula | Cincinnati Bengals | T |
| 1984 | 9 | 14 | 238 | Scott Bolzan | New England Patriots | T |
| 1986 | 5 | 7 | 117 | Scott Kellar | Indianapolis Colts | DE |
| 1986 | 6 | 17 | 155 | Curt Pardridge | San Diego Chargers | WR |
| 1986 | 7 | 5 | 171 | Steve O'Malley | Indianapolis Colts | DT |
| 1987 | 4 | 7 | 91 | Doug Bartlett | Los Angeles Rams | LB |
| 1987 | 8 | 24 | 219 | Clarence Vaughn | Washington Redskins | DB |
| 1987 | 11 | 6 | 285 | Todd Peat | St. Louis Cardinals | G |
| 1990 | 8 | 18 | 211 | Brett Tucker | Houston Oilers | DB |
| 1994 | 3 | 19 | 84 | LeShon Johnson | Green Bay Packers | RB |
| 2001 | 4 | 23 | 118 | Ryan Diem | Indianapolis Colts | T |
| 2001 | 4 | 29 | 124 | Justin McCareins | Tennessee Titans | WR |
| 2002 | 7 | 14 | 225 | Darrell Hill | Tennessee Titans | WR |
| 2004 | 5 | 22 | 154 | Michael Turner | San Diego Chargers | RB |
| 2007 | 3 | 30 | 93 | Garrett Wolfe | Chicago Bears | RB |
| 2007 | 4 | 23 | 122 | Doug Free | Dallas Cowboys | T |
| 2009 | 1 | 16 | 16 | Larry English | San Diego Chargers | DE |
| 2012 | 7 | 46 | 253 | Chandler Harnish | Indianapolis Colts | QB |
| 2014 | 1 | 30 | 30 | Jimmie Ward | San Francisco 49ers | DB |
| 2014 | 7 | 36 | 251 | Ken Bishop | Dallas Cowboys | DT |
| 2015 | 7 | 16 | 233 | Da'Ron Brown | Kansas City Chiefs | WR |
| 2017 | 3 | 32 | 96 | Kenny Golladay | Detroit Lions | WR |
| 2019 | 2 | 23 | 55 | Max Scharping | Houston Texans | T |
| 2019 | 6 | 2 | 175 | Sutton Smith | Pittsburgh Steelers | DE |
