= Rich Gannon =

American football player (born 1965)

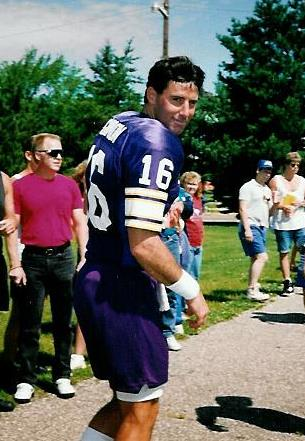
- Gannon in 1992

No. 16, 12
- Position: Quarterback

Personal information
- Born: December 20, 1965 (age 60); Philadelphia, Pennsylvania, U.S.
- Listed height: 6 ft 3 in (1.91 m)
- Listed weight: 210 lb (95 kg)

Career information
- High school: St. Joseph's Preparatory (Philadelphia)
- College: Delaware (1984–1986)
- NFL draft: 1987: 4th round, 98th overall pick

Career history
- Minnesota Vikings (1987–1992); Washington Redskins (1993); Kansas City Chiefs (1995–1998); Oakland Raiders (1999–2004)

Awards and highlights
- NFL Most Valuable Player (2002); 2× First-team All-Pro (2000, 2002); 4× Pro Bowl (1999–2002); NFL passing yards leader (2002); NFL Player of the Year (2002); 2× Bert Bell Award (2000, 2002)

Career NFL statistics
- Passing attempts: 4,206
- Passing completions: 2,533
- Completion percentage: 60.2%
- TD–INT: 180–104
- Passing yards: 28,743
- Passer rating: 84.7
- Rushing yards: 2,449
- Rushing touchdowns: 21
- Stats at Pro Football Reference

Richard Joseph Gannon (born December 20, 1965) is an American former professional football player who was a quarterback for 17 seasons in the National Football League (NFL). Subsequently, he was a sports commentator with CBS Sports for 16 years.

Gannon was born in Philadelphia, Pennsylvania, and played college football for the Delaware Fightin' Blue Hens in coach Tubby Raymond's Wing-T offense. He recorded at least 2,000 offensive yards for three straight seasons at Delaware and was Yankee Conference Offensive Player of the Year as a senior. In the 1987 NFL draft, the New England Patriots selected Gannon in the fourth round intent upon converting Gannon to running back. He soon was traded to the Minnesota Vikings, and played with the Vikings until 1992.

Gannon began his career as a backup for Wade Wilson. Gannon started his first games in 1990 in relief of an injured Wilson and would start many games in 1991. In 1992, he formally became the starting quarterback for the Vikings and led the Vikings to an 11–5 season and the playoffs after two consecutive losing seasons.

Gannon played for the Washington Redskins in 1993, the Kansas City Chiefs from 1995 to 1998, and the Oakland Raiders from 1999 to 2004. With the Raiders, he achieved his greatest successes, including four consecutive seasons making the Pro Bowl (1999–2002), three consecutive postseason appearances for the Raiders (2000–2002), two All-Pro selections (2000, 2002), one MVP, and an appearance in Super Bowl XXXVII. However, Gannon spent much of his final two seasons (2003 and 2004) with injuries, and the Raiders had losing records in those seasons. After retiring from football before the 2005 season, Gannon began a career in sports broadcasting. He served as a sports analyst for NFL on CBS through the 2020 NFL season.

== Early life ==
Gannon attended Saint Joseph's Preparatory School in Philadelphia, Pennsylvania and won three varsity letters each in football and crew and twice in basketball. In his senior season, he earned first team All-City as a punter and quarterback, passing for 1,567 yards.

== College career ==
Gannon attended the University of Delaware where he was a member of Sigma Phi Epsilon. In football, he was coached by Tubby Raymond and played within Raymond's wing T offense. With the Delaware Fightin' Blue Hens football team, Gannon first played as a punter before switching to quarterback in his sophomore year. Gannon set 21 school records, including total offense (7,432 yards), passing yards (5,927), pass attempts (845), and completions (462) and was the only Delaware player at the time to achieve at least 2,000 yards of offense three years in a row. As a sophomore, Gannon won the Eastern College Athletic Conference Division I-AA Rookie of the Year award in 1984. In 1986, during his senior season, Gannon won Yankee Conference Offensive Player of the Year honors and was an honorable mention All-American selection.

When he led the Raiders to Super Bowl XXXVII in 2003, he was the second player from the University of Delaware to go to the Super Bowl.

== Professional career ==
Pre-draft measurables
Height	Weight	Arm length	Hand span	40-yard dash	10-yard split	20-yard split	20-yard shuttle	Vertical jump	Broad jump	Bench press
6 ft 2 1/4 in (1.89 m)	193 lb (88 kg)	30 in (0.76 m)	9 1/2 in (0.24 m)	4.58 s	1.60 s	2.64 s	4.11 s	32.5 in (0.83 m)	9 ft 2 in (2.79 m)	7 reps
All values from NFL Combine

=== Minnesota Vikings ===
==== 1987 ====
Gannon was selected in the fourth round (98th overall) of the 1987 NFL draft by the New England Patriots, who envisioned converting him to a running back, defensive back, or wide receiver. Gannon balked at the idea, and he was quickly traded to the Minnesota Vikings. Gannon began his career with the Vikings as a backup to starting quarterback Wade Wilson. Gannon played four regular and one postseason games in his rookie season of 1987 and accumulated statistics in the Week 10 (November 22) game, a 24–13 victory over the Atlanta Falcons where he completed 2 of 6 passes for 18 yards. Despite the Vikings finishing just above .500 on the season at 8–7, they unexpectedly won their first two postseason games, though Gannon was lightly used in the playoffs, rushing for 3 yards in the Vikings' Wild Card game, a 44–10 win over the New Orleans Saints on the road. That game was the first playoff game in Saints team history. The Cinderella Vikings eventually lost the NFC championship game to the eventual Super Bowl XXII champion Washington Redskins.

==== 1988 ====
For the 1988 season, Gannon was third-string after Wade Wilson and Tommy Kramer. Gannon played three games in 1988. In a Week 5 (October 2) 24–7 loss to the Miami Dolphins, Gannon completed 7 of 15 passes for 90 yards but was sacked twice for 15. He also rushed twice for 15 yards. Gannon took a knee in the Vikings' Week 8 (October 23) victory over the Tampa Bay Buccaneers. In Week 10 (November 6), Gannon was sacked for 7 yards and rushed for 15 yards in a 44–17 win over the Detroit Lions. Improving from 1987, the 1988 Vikings finished 11–5 and advanced to the divisional round of the playoffs.

==== 1989 ====
Gannon did not play at all during the regular season, during which the Vikings went 10–6. In the Vikings' postseason divisional playoff game, a 41–13 loss to the San Francisco 49ers, the Vikings used all three quarterbacks (Wilson, Kramer, and Gannon), and Gannon was 13 of 18 passing for 144 yards and 1 interception. He rushed for 7 yards and was sacked twice for a total 20 yards.

==== 1990 ====
Gannon started his first game in Week 4 (September 30) of 1990 after Wade Wilson had torn thumb ligaments. The Vikings lost that game to the Tampa Bay Buccaneers in overtime 23–20. Steve Christie kicked the winning field goal for Tampa in a drive started from a Wayne Haddix interception of a Gannon pass. Gannon would play 14 games in 1990 and start 12.

Gannon won his first career start in Week 9 (November 4) with a 27–22 win over the Denver Broncos. John Elway, starting quarterback for the Broncos, left the game due to injury after building a 16–0 first-half lead for Denver. Gannon made the winning touchdown drive on a 56-yard trick play pass: first to Herschel Walker, who pitched back to Gannon, who made a deep pass to Anthony Carter for the touchdown. Minnesota won despite Gannon completing less than half of his passes (6-for-13) and being sacked 7 times. The following week against the Detroit Lions, Gannon rushed for a one-yard touchdown and passed for 147 yards completing 12 of 17 passes as the Vikings won 17–7. These games began a five-game winning streak for Minnesota after a 1–6 start. However, the Vikings would finish 6–10 after losing the last four games of the year. For the season, he was 182 of 349 passing for 2,278 yards, 16 touchdowns, and 16 interceptions. He was sacked 34 times and rushed 52 times for 268 yards.

==== 1991 ====
In the 1991 preseason, Vikings coach Jerry Burns demoted Gannon to third-string and elevated Sean Salisbury to second-string behind Wade Wilson. Gannon played his first game of the year in Week 5 (September 29) against the Denver Broncos, replacing Wade Wilson with 7:20 left in the fourth quarter after Wilson threw three interceptions. On fourth down at Denver's 13-yard line with 43 seconds left, a wide-open Hassan Jones dropped Gannon's pass, and Minnesota lost 13–6. Gannon would replace Wilson as starter for the last 11 games of 1991, and the Vikings went 6–5 with Gannon as starter for an overall 8–8 season. Gannon was 211 of 354 in completed passes for 2,166 yards, 12 touchdowns, and 6 interceptions. He was sacked 19 times for 91 yards and rushed 43 times for 236 yards, including two rushing touchdowns.

==== 1992 ====
Competing with Sean Salisbury for the starting job, Gannon ultimately became the Vikings' starting quarterback for 1992. In the final exhibition game of 1992, and with first-year coach Dennis Green, he led the Vikings to a 30–0 defeat of defending Super Bowl champions Washington Redskins in the Redskins' home field, completing 14 of 21 passes for 124 yards and three touchdowns.

In the fourth quarter of the Week 5 (October 4) home game against the Chicago Bears, Gannon led a Vikings rally from a 20–0 deficit to a 21–20 victory. Following a touchdown off an interception by Todd Scott, Gannon led a touchdown drive with four consecutive passes, the last one to Cris Carter in the end zone. With 6:40 left in the fourth quarter, Gannon led a 78-yard touchdown drive that included the Vikings' seventh straight first-down play of the game. The drive began with Gannon handing off to running back Terry Allen for a 21-yard rush, followed by a 22-yard rush by Roger Craig, who would make the tying 1-yard touchdown run, followed by the winning extra point kick.

In Week 7 (October 15), Gannon started against the Detroit Lions and completed 8 of 10 passes for 146 yards and two touchdowns for a 24–0 lead. Salisbury took over in the second quarter after Gannon suffered a hyperextended left knee, and the Vikings beat the Lions 31–14. The Vikings now were a surprising 5–1 after going a combined 14–18 in the 1990 and 1991 seasons.

With Minnesota leading the NFC Central with an 8–3 record, Dennis Green benched Gannon in favor of Salisbury following the Week 12 (November 23) win over the Cleveland Browns.

=== Washington Redskins ===
==== 1993 ====
On August 19, 1993, the Vikings traded Gannon to the Washington Redskins for a conditional 1994 fifth-round draft pick. Gannon was the third-stringer behind starter Mark Rypien and backup Cary Conklin. With the Redskins, Gannon played in eight games and started the four games from Weeks 12 to 15.

Gannon played his first game of 1993 in Week 5 (October 4), a Monday night game, taking over for Cary Conklin against the Miami Dolphins and Dan Marino. Gannon could only lead one touchdown drive that brought Washington within a 14–10 deficit behind Miami. With 59 seconds left, Gannon threw an interception to the Dolphins' Troy Vincent to seal the Dolphins' 17–10 victory. Gannon injured his foot during the game. However, Gannon would play in limited roles in Weeks 6 and 7. After a 2–7 start, Redskins coach Richie Petitbon announced he would bench Mark Rypien and start Rich Gannon once Gannon recovered from the injury.

In Week 12 (November 21) against the Los Angeles Rams, Gannon completed 24 of 39 passes for 170 yards, was sacked three times for 11 yards, and rushed twice for 18 yards. With Los Angeles leading 10–6 and 3:10 left in the game, Gannon missed an opportunity for a game-winning drive. At the Rams' 27, Gannon's 23-yard pass intended for Art Monk bounced off Rams safety Anthony Newman's hands and into Michael Stewart's hands for an interception, sealing the victory for the Rams.

The following week (November 28), Gannon threw two touchdown passes in the fourth quarter to give the Redskins a 14–10 lead over the Philadelphia Eagles. However, Philadelphia would win 17–14 on a touchdown reception by James Joseph. On 20-for-31 passing for 279 yards, Gannon threw two interceptions and two touchdowns that game. He was sacked five times for 27 yards and rushed four times for 25 yards.

Gannon led the Redskins to a Week 14 (December 5) victory over the Tampa Bay Buccaneers, 23–17, starting with a cumulative 17–0 lead by the third quarter. Gannon completed 9 of 16 passes for 71 yards and rushed 7 times for 12 yards. Gannon's one interception that game came when Buccaneers defensive tackle Santana Dotson deflected the pass from the Redskins 8 and Ray Seals caught the ball in the Redskins' end zone for a touchdown. The score was 17–10 Redskins as the Buccaneers rallied with 10 unanswered points.

In the Redskins' 3–0 loss to the New York Jets in Week 15 (December 12), Gannon was benched in the fourth quarter in favor of Mark Rypien, but the Redskins could not handle the Jets' defense. Gannon completed 7 of 15 passes for 62 yards (including one 50-yarder).

On 74 of 125 passing (59.2 percent), Gannon passed for 704 yards with three touchdowns and seven interceptions and rushed 21 times for 88 yards and one touchdown. The Redskins finished 1993 with a 4–12 record, and Gannon was 1–3 as a starter, with the three losses all being within margins four points or less.

=== Kansas City Chiefs ===
Gannon sat out the 1994 season after shoulder surgery. In 1995, Gannon signed with the Kansas City Chiefs. For two years he served as a backup to Steve Bono. In 1997, a quarterback controversy was created when the Gannon-led Chiefs excelled in the absence of the injured Elvis Grbac. In the playoffs, coach Marty Schottenheimer elected to play Grbac instead of Gannon, and the Chiefs lost 14–10. The two ended up splitting snaps in 1998, after Grbac was injured in Week 1.

=== Oakland Raiders ===
In mid-February 1999, Gannon was signed as a free agent by the Oakland Raiders, agreeing to a reportedly four-year, $16-million deal. He excelled in head coach Jon Gruden's West Coast offense and was voted to the Pro Bowl in his first year as a Raider – the first of four straight selections. In 2001 and 2002, he won the Pro Bowl MVP award consecutively, a feat achieved by no other NFL player.

Gannon won the NFL Most Valuable Player Award after a record-setting 2002 season, throwing for 4,689 yards and 26 touchdowns and recording a career-high 97.2 passer rating, which helped the Raiders advance to Super Bowl XXXVII, making him the first former Blue Hens quarterback to start a Super Bowl. He was passing at a record pace with more passing yards than any quarterback in history through 14 games at the time but fell off the pace in the last few weeks. He led the league with 418 completions on 618 attempts.

In the Super Bowl, Gannon threw a Super Bowl-record five interceptions – three of which were run back for touchdowns – in a 48–21 loss to the Tampa Bay Buccaneers. The Buccaneers' defense was aided by the fact that their new head coach was Jon Gruden, who had knowledge of the Raiders' playbook as well as Gannon's mannerisms and even some audibles, which Raiders head coach Bill Callahan had left unchanged after Gruden's departure.

Gannon's 2003 season was ended by a shoulder injury in Week 7 after a 2–5 start. A serious neck injury in 2004 effectively ended his career. Gannon was hurt in Week 3 when he scrambled, and slid into a helmet-to-helmet collision with Tampa Bay linebacker Derrick Brooks.

When the Raiders signed Kerry Collins prior to the 2004 season, some thought that Gannon would be cut in favor of the strong-armed Collins, whom skeptics thought was a better fit in new head coach Norv Turner's vertical offense. Gannon not only kept his starting quarterback spot, but thrived. He threw for 305 yards in the season opener against the Pittsburgh Steelers, including a 40-yard touchdown strike to Doug Gabriel. The Raiders nearly won the game over a Steelers team that finished the 2004 season with 15 victories. The Raiders were a competitive team with Gannon as their quarterback, going 2–1 when he started and 3–10 after his injury.

== Career statistics ==
=== NFL ===
Legend
	AP NFL MVP
	Led the league
**Bold**	Career high

Year	Team	Games			Passing								
Year	Team	GP	GS	Record	Cmp	Att	Pct	Yds	Avg	TD	Int	Lng	Rtg
1987	MIN	4	0	—	2	6	33.3	18	3.0	0	1	12	2.8
1988	MIN	3	0	—	7	15	46.7	90	6.0	0	0	19	66.0
1989	MIN	0	0	—	DNP								
1990	MIN	14	12	5–7	182	349	52.1	2,278	6.5	16	**16**	78	68.9
1991	MIN	15	11	6–5	211	354	59.6	2,166	6.1	12	6	50	81.5
1992	MIN	12	12	8–4	159	279	57.0	1,905	6.8	12	13	60	72.9
1993	WAS	8	4	1–3	74	125	59.2	704	5.6	3	7	54	59.6
1995	KC	2	0	—	7	11	63.6	57	5.2	0	0	18	76.7
1996	KC	4	3	1–2	54	90	60.0	491	5.5	6	1	25	92.4
1997	KC	9	6	5–1	98	175	56.0	1,144	6.5	7	4	47	79.8
1998	KC	12	10	5–5	206	354	58.2	2,305	6.5	10	6	80	80.1
1999	OAK	**16**	**16**	8–8	304	515	59.0	3,840	7.5	24	14	50	86.5
2000	OAK	**16**	**16**	**12–4**	284	473	60.0	3,430	7.3	**28**	11	**84**	92.4
2001	OAK	**16**	**16**	10–6	361	549	65.8	3,828	7.0	27	9	49	95.5
2002	OAK	**16**	**16**	11–5	**418**	**618**	**68.0**	**4,689**	7.6	26	10	75	**97.3**
2003	OAK	7	7	2–5	125	225	55.6	1,274	5.7	6	4	46	73.5
2004	OAK	3	3	2–1	41	68	60.3	524	**7.7**	3	2	58	86.9
Career		157	132	76–56	2,533	4,206	60.2	28,743	6.8	180	104	84	84.7

=== College ===
Season	Team	Passing						Rushing	
Season	Team	Cmp	Att	Yds	TD	Int	QB rating	Att	Yds
1984	Delaware	126	239	1,555	12	11	114.7	147	529
1985	Delaware	134	244	1,576	7	10	110.4	149	443
1986	Delaware	201	361	2,795	16	11	129.2	190	537
Career		461	844	5,926	35	32	119.7	486	1,509

== Awards and highlights ==
- AFC champion (2002)
- NFL Most Valuable Player (2002)
- 4× Pro Bowl (1999–2002)
- 2× First-team All-Pro (2000, 2002)
- 3× AFC Player of the Year (2000–2002)
- 2× Kansas City 101 AFC Offensive Player of the Year (2000, 2002)
- 2× Pro Bowl MVP (2000, 2001)
- 2× NFL Alumni Quarterback of the Year (2000, 2002)
- NFL passing yards leader (2002)
- AFC passing touchdowns leader (2001)
- AFC passer rating leader (2001)
- AFC completion percentage leader (2001)
- 2× Bert Bell Award (2000, 2002)
- SN NFL Player of the Year (2002)
- 4× AFC Offensive Player of the Week (Week 10, 1999; 2000; 2001; 2002)
- NFC Offensive Player of the Week (Week 4, 1992)
- Voted into University of Delaware Athletics Hall of Fame in 2005
- Inducted into the Delaware Sports Hall of Fame in 2016

== Retirement ==
On August 6, 2005, Gannon officially retired from football and joined CBS television as an NFL analyst. He was inducted into the University of Delaware athletics hall of fame that same year.

For his career accolades, Gannon was named the 28th greatest quarterback of the modern era by Football Nation in 2012.

== Broadcasting ==
Gannon joined CBS Sports as an NFL game analyst in August 2005 alongside Kevin Harlan. He also works as a game analyst for Las Vegas Raiders preseason games.

On February 22, 2021, Gannon was let go as a game commentator for CBS.

== Personal life ==
Gannon's father-in-law was former Minnesota Vikings running back Bill Brown. Gannon and his wife, Shelley, have two daughters. One daughter was diagnosed with celiac disease and her parents serve as national spokespeople for the Celiac Disease Foundation and organize an annual Celiac Walk at Holy Family Catholic High School in Victoria, Minnesota. Gannon is a practicing Roman Catholic.

== See also ==
- List of most consecutive starts by a National Football League quarterback
