= Robert Delpino =

American football player (born 1965)

No. 39
- Position: Running back

Personal information
- Born: November 2, 1965 (age 61); Dodge City, Kansas, U.S.
- Listed height: 6 ft 0 in (1.83 m)
- Listed weight: 198 lb (90 kg)

Career information
- High school: Dodge City
- College: Missouri
- NFL draft: 1988: 5th round, 117th overall pick

Career history
- Los Angeles Rams (1988–1992); Denver Broncos (1993)

Awards and highlights
- Second-team All-Big Eight (1987)

Career NFL statistics
- Rushing yards: 1,815
- Rushing average: 3.6
- Receptions: 178
- Receiving yards: 1,769
- Total touchdowns: 27
- Stats at Pro Football Reference

Robert Lewis Delpino (born November 2, 1965) is an American former professional football player who was a running back in the National Football League (NFL). He played six seasons in the league for the Los Angeles Rams (1988–1992) and the Denver Broncos (1993). Delpino played college football for the Missouri Tigers and was selected by the Rams in the fifth round of the 1988 NFL draft.

== NFL career statistics ==
Legend
**Bold**	Career high

=== Regular season ===
Year	Team	Games		Rushing					Receiving				
Year	Team	GP	GS	Att	Yds	Avg	Lng	TD	Rec	Yds	Avg	Lng	TD
1988	RAM	15	3	34	147	4.3	13	0	30	312	10.4	38	2
1989	RAM	**16**	1	78	368	**4.7**	32	1	34	334	9.8	25	1
1990	RAM	15	2	13	52	4.0	13	0	15	172	**11.5**	42	**4**
1991	RAM	**16**	**15**	**214**	**688**	3.2	**36**	**9**	**55**	**617**	11.2	**78**	1
1992	RAM	10	4	32	115	3.6	31	0	18	139	7.7	12	1
1993	DEN	**16**	4	131	445	3.4	18	8	26	195	7.5	25	0
Career		88	29	502	1,815	3.6	36	18	178	1,769	9.9	78	9

=== Playoffs ===
Year	Team	Games		Rushing					Receiving				
Year	Team	GP	GS	Att	Yds	Avg	Lng	TD	Rec	Yds	Avg	Lng	TD
1988	RAM	1	0	3	4	1.3	4	0	2	**33**	**16.5**	**21**	0
1989	RAM	**3**	0	1	3	3.0	3	0	**3**	31	10.3	16	0
1993	DEN	1	**1**	**9**	**32**	**3.6**	**16**	0	0	0	0.0	0	0
Career		5	1	13	39	3.0	16	0	5	64	12.8	21	0
