= Dale Hatcher =

American football player (born 1963)

No. 3, 5, 7
- Position: Punter

Personal information
- Born: April 5, 1963 (age 63); Cheraw, South Carolina, U.S.
- Listed height: 6 ft 2 in (1.88 m)
- Listed weight: 209 lb (95 kg)

Career information
- High school: Cheraw
- College: Clemson
- NFL draft: 1985: 3rd round, 77th overall pick

Career history
- Los Angeles Rams (1985–1989); Green Bay Packers (1990)*; Los Angeles Rams (1991); San Francisco 49ers (1992)*; Miami Dolphins (1993)
- * Offseason or practice squad member only

Awards and highlights
- First-team All-Pro (1985); Pro Bowl (1985); NFL punting yards leader (1987); PFWA All-Rookie Team (1985); National champion (1981); First-team All-American (1984); First-team All-ACC (1984)

Career NFL statistics
- Punts: 490
- Punting yards: 19,606
- Punting average: 40
- Stats at Pro Football Reference

Roger Dale Hatcher (born April 5, 1963) is an American former professional football player who was a punter in the National Football League (NFL).

Hatcher was born and raised in Cheraw, South Carolina and played scholastically at Cheraw High School. He played college football for the Clemson Tigers, where, as a senior, he was honored by Gannett News Service as a first-team All-American.

Hatcher was selected in the third round of the 1985 NFL draft by the Los Angeles Rams. He had an outstanding rookie season, averaging 43.2 yards per punt and being selected to the Pro Bowl, as well as Associated Press first-team All-Pro. He spent five more seasons with the Rams, and finished his career with the Miami Dolphins in 1993.

Hatcher's blocked punt decided the first overtime regular-season NFL game to be decided by a safety. On November 5, 1989, in Minneapolis, Minnesota, Hatcher helped end the game as he tried to punt, only to have it blocked by Minnesota Vikings linebacker Mike Merriweather to give the Vikings a 23–21 win over the Rams. Teammate Jim Everett threw for the only three touchdowns of the game for the Rams as the Vikings' only other points were Rich Karlis' record-tying seven field goals.

After his professional football career ended, Hatcher took a job working at Freightliner Custom Chassis in Gaffney, South Carolina.

== NFL career statistics ==
Legend
	Led the league
**Bold**	Career high

=== Regular season ===
Year	Team	Punting									
Year	Team	GP	Punts	Yds	Net Yds	Lng	Avg	Net Avg	Blk	Ins20	TB
1985	RAM	**16**	87	**3,761**	**3,344**	**67**	**43.2**	**38.0**	**1**	**31**	6
1986	RAM	**16**	**97**	3,740	3,224	57	38.6	32.9	**1**	26	5
1987	RAM	15	76	3,140	2,743	62	41.3	35.6	**1**	20	4
1988	RAM	7	36	1,424	1,202	54	39.6	33.4	0	13	1
1989	RAM	**16**	73	2,834	2,379	54	38.8	32.1	**1**	15	**7**
1991	RAM	13	63	2,403	2,072	52	38.1	32.9	0	16	5
1993	MIA	**16**	58	2,304	1,865	56	39.7	32.2	0	13	4
Career		99	490	19,606	16,829	67	40.0	34.1	4	134	32

=== Playoffs ===
Year	Team	Punting									
Year	Team	GP	Punts	Yds	Net Yds	Lng	Avg	Net Avg	Blk	Ins20	TB
1985	RAM	2	**18**	**716**	**665**	55	39.8	36.9	0	5	0
1986	RAM	1	3	115	107	42	38.3	35.7	0	0	0
1988	RAM	1	5	241	226	**63**	**48.2**	**45.2**	0	2	0
1989	RAM	**3**	**18**	600	553	47	33.3	30.7	0	**7**	**2**
Career		7	44	1,672	1,551	63	38.0	35.3	0	14	2
