= Mike Young (American football) =

American football player (born 1962)

No. 88, 83, 85
- Position: Wide receiver

Personal information
- Born: February 21, 1962 (age 64); Hanford, California, U.S.
- Listed height: 6 ft 1 in (1.85 m)
- Listed weight: 187 lb (85 kg)

Career information
- High school: Mt. Whitney (Visalia, California)
- College: UCLA (1981–1984)
- NFL draft: 1985: 6th round, 161st overall pick

Career history
- Los Angeles Rams (1985–1988); Denver Broncos (1989–1992); Kansas City Chiefs (1993)*; Philadelphia Eagles (1993); Kansas City Chiefs (1994)
- * Offseason or practice squad member only

Awards and highlights
- Second-team All-Pac-10 (1984)

Career NFL statistics
- Receptions: 144
- Receiving yards: 2,034
- Receiving touchdowns: 14
- Stats at Pro Football Reference

Michael David Young (born February 21, 1962) is an American former professional football player who was a wide receiver for 10 seasons in the National Football League (NFL). He played college football for the UCLA Bruins before playing in the NFL for the Los Angeles Rams, Denver Broncos, Philadelphia Eagles, and Kansas City Chiefs. Young’s career in professional sports has spanned over 33 years as he is one of the very few NFL players to occupy senior level executive positions for multiple professional sports franchises.

== College career ==
The Visalia, California native was a multi-sport athlete at Mt. Whitney High School, where he excelled in football and baseball. Michael’s career statistics of 162 catches for 3,005 yards and 44 touchdowns still stand as one of the top performances in CIF history. Young was recruited by every major college football program in the country, accepting recruiting visits to Notre Dame, USC, Nebraska, Oklahoma, Washington and UCLA.

At UCLA, he played both football and baseball. Young helped the Bruins to two Pac-10 titles, two Rose Bowl (1983, 1984) victories and a Fiesta Bowl (1985) win. Michael was an Academic All-Pac 10 selection in 1984 and, in the 1984 Rose Bowl game, Young had five receptions for a total of 127 yards, including a 52-yard touchdown pass from Rick Neuheisel. As a two-sport athlete, Young was selected by the New York Mets in 1983 after hitting .311 his sophomore year. Following the 1985 Fiesta Bowl win, in which he was the leading receiver, he was drafted by the Los Angeles Rams. He earned a bachelor's degree in sociology from UCLA.

== Professional career ==
Young was selected by the Los Angeles Rams in the sixth round (161st overall) of the 1985 NFL draft. In 10 years in the NFL, he played in 114 games, amassing 144 receptions, 2,034 yards and 14 touchdowns.

Young played in Super Bowl XXIV in 1989, where his Denver Broncos lost to the San Francisco 49ers. In that playoff run, he had 4 receptions for 145 yards and a touchdown, which remains the Broncos' franchise record of yards per reception for a single postseason, at 36.3.

== NFL career statistics ==
Legend
**Bold**	Career high

=== Regular season ===
Year	Team	Games		Receiving				
Year	Team	GP	GS	Rec	Yds	Avg	Lng	TD
1985	RAM	15	1	14	157	11.2	23	0
1986	RAM	**16**	1	15	181	12.1	21	3
1987	RAM	12	0	4	56	14.0	26	1
1988	RAM	8	0	2	27	13.5	18	0
1989	DEN	**16**	0	22	402	**18.3**	47	2
1990	DEN	**16**	1	28	385	13.8	42	**4**
1991	DEN	**16**	**13**	**44**	**629**	14.3	**52**	2
1992	DEN	3	0	1	11	11.0	11	0
1993	PHI	10	0	14	186	13.3	49	2
1994	KAN	2	0	0	0	0.0	0	0
		114	16	144	2,034	14.1	52	14

=== Playoffs ===
Year	Team	Games		Receiving				
Year	Team	GP	GS	Rec	Yds	Avg	Lng	TD
1985	RAM	2	0	0	0	0.0	0	0
1986	RAM	1	0	0	0	0.0	0	0
1989	DEN	**3**	0	4	**145**	**36.3**	**70**	**1**
1991	DEN	2	**2**	**7**	110	15.7	32	0
		8	2	11	255	23.2	70	1

== Post-NFL career ==
Young successfully made the transition to the Broncos’ front office after a 10-year career as a wide receiver in the National Football League. In 13 years in the front office of the Denver Broncos, he was responsible for the development and management of corporate partnerships, marketing, and branding. Initially hired by Broncos owner Pat Bowlen to develop and implement a corporate partnerships program, Young was instrumental in creating the platform and eventual sale of the stadium naming rights of INVESCO Field at Mile High Stadium. During his tenure, Young oversaw several major rebranding efforts including a collaborative effort with Phil Knight of Nike to redesign the Broncos team logos and uniforms, which propelled the Broncos from 20th to one of the top three teams in NFL merchandise sales. Young was also responsible for the creation and design of the Broncos’ first and only mascot, Miles.

In 2003, while serving as the Broncos’ Senior Director of Special Projects, Young, along with the backing of Bowlen, John Elway and Denver sports mogul Stan Kroenke, launched the Colorado Crush of the Arena Football League (AFL). In his role as Executive Vice President, Young designed and implemented the Crush's entire business strategy. In the first two years of its existence, the Crush sold out every game to lead the AFL in attendance and, in its third year of existence, won the ArenaBowl.

On May 22, 2009, Young was appointed as Chief Revenue Officer for the Los Angeles Dodgers. As the first and only Chief Revenue Officer of the franchise, he oversaw all major revenue streams, which included ticket sales, corporate sales, premium seating and all media partnerships. Throughout Young’s career, he has been personally responsible for the development of corporate partnership transactions which have generated over $350,000,000. Young has created and led departments that have transacted with virtually every major corporation connected to sports and entertainment resulting in over a billion dollars in total revenues.
