= Casey Tiumalu =

American football player (born 1961)

Profile
- Position: Running back

Personal information
- Born: June 19, 1961 (age 65); San Diego, California, U.S.
- Listed height: 5 ft 8 in (1.73 m)
- Listed weight: 206 lb (93 kg)

Career information
- High school: Helix (La Mesa, California)
- College: BYU
- NFL draft: 1984: undrafted

Career history
- Los Angeles Rams (1987)

Awards and highlights
- First-team All-WAC (1983); Second-team All-WAC (1982)
- Stats at Pro Football Reference

Casey James Tiumalu (born June 19, 1961) is an American former professional football player who was a running back for the Los Angeles Rams in the National Football League (NFL). He played one season for the Rams in 1987. He played college football for the BYU Cougars, twice earning all-conference honors in the Western Athletic Conference (WAC).

== Early life ==
Tiumalu was a three-year letterman on the varsity football team at Helix High School in La Mesa, California, and earned All-California Interscholastic Federation honors as a senior. He led Helix to a 17–10 win over San Pasqual in the 1978 CIF championship. Tiumalu scored all but two of the Highlanders' 17 points, running for two touchdowns and kicking a 38-yard field goal, which was the longest in the history of the finals. He finished with 160 yards rushing on 14 carries after only rushing twice for six yards in the first half.

== College career ==
Tiumalu wanted to attend the University of Hawaiʻi at Mānoa out of high school, but the school did not pursue him after initially expressing interest. Undersized and not highly recruited, he attended Grossmont College in El Cajon, California, where he was team captain and its most valuable player, while also earning junior college All-American honors.

After transferring to Brigham Young University, Tiumalu led the Cougars in rushing in each of his two seasons. While he originally wanted to go to a program that ran the ball, he said that BYU's pass-oriented offense "[got] the ball to me enough here". Previously, Cougars' running backs were often relegated to being blockers. Tiumalu ran for 661 yards on 119 carries as a junior in 1982, when he was named to the All-WAC second team. In his senior year in 1983, he earned first-team all-conference honors, and was named an honorable mention All-American by the Associated Press. He rushed 139 times for 851 yards, including four games with over 100 yards. He also had a team-leading 60 receptions as the outlet man for quarterback Steve Young. Tiumalu was named WAC Offensive Player of the Week after gaining 170 all-purpose yards to help lead BYU to a 24–6 win over Colorado State, which clinched an eighth straight WAC title for the Cougars. He had 15 carries for 107 yards and had eight catches for another 63 yards.

== Professional career ==
Despite his success at BYU, Tiumalu's 5-foot-8-inch (1.73 m) stature precluded him from receiving any minicamp invites from NFL teams. He had a brief tryout in the United States Football League (USFL) with the Los Angeles Express, who selected him in the 14th round of the 1984 USFL draft. He then signed with the Saskatchewan Roughriders of the Canadian Football League, but tore cartilage in his knee during the 1984 preseason and underwent surgery. Estimated to be sidelined for six weeks, he was released by the Roughriders. Tiumalu played for the Los Angeles Rams in 1987, joining as a replacement player during the NFL strike that season.

== Personal life ==
Tiumalu's son Casey Jr. played football as a defensive lineman at Helix and later Vista High.

Tiumalu was a cousin of NFL linebacker Junior Seau.
