= Greg Williamson (American football) =

American football player (born 1964)

No. 43
- Position: Cornerback

Personal information
- Born: May 11, 1964 (age 62); Long Beach, California, U.S.
- Listed height: 5 ft 11 in (1.80 m)
- Listed weight: 185 lb (84 kg)

Career information
- High school: Millikan (Long Beach)
- College: Cerritos JC (1983–1984); Fresno State (1985–1986)
- NFL draft: 1987: undrafted

Career history
- Los Angeles Rams (1987)

Career NFL statistics
- Interceptions: 1
- Stats at Pro Football Reference

External videos
- October 4, 1987 #Saints #Rams (1987). Video of the play featuring Williamson's only career interception

Gregery Scott Williamson (born May 11, 1964) is an American former professional football player who was a cornerback for the Los Angeles Rams of the National Football League (NFL). He played college football for the Fresno State Bulldogs.

Williamson played three games in his career, each as a starter, being a replacement player during the 1987 NFL strike. Against the New Orleans Saints, he recorded his only career interception, which he returned 28 yards. Near midfield, he fumbled, which was recovered by Shawn Miller, who then fumbled after reaching the Saints 23 yard-line; Saints quarterback John Fourcade recovered and ran 77 yards for a touchdown, but it was called back due to Williamson's fumble being ruled an illegal forward lateral.
