= Mike Lansford =

American football player (born 1958)

No. 4, 1
- Position: Kicker

Personal information
- Born: July 20, 1958 (age 68); Monterey Park, California, U.S.
- Listed height: 6 ft 0 in (1.83 m)
- Listed weight: 183 lb (83 kg)

Career information
- High school: Arcadia (Arcadia, California)
- College: Washington
- NFL draft: 1980: 12th round, 312th overall pick

Career history
- New York Giants (1980)*; San Francisco 49ers (1980)*; Oakland Raiders (1981)*; Los Angeles Rams (1982–1990); Cleveland Browns (1991)*; Kansas City Chiefs (1992)*
- * Offseason or practice squad member only

Awards and highlights
- Second-team All-Pac-10 (1979)

Career NFL statistics
- Field goals attempted: 217
- Field goals made: 158
- Field goal %: 72.8
- Longest field goal: 52
- Stats at Pro Football Reference

Michael John Lansford (born July 20, 1958) is a former National Football League (NFL) placekicker from 1982–1990 for the Los Angeles Rams. In 1989, he led the league with 51 extra points. He is one of seven barefooted kickers in NFL history.

Lansford was known more for accuracy and being a clutch kicker than he was for a strong leg. He was only 4 of 17 in his career on field goal attempts of 50 yards or more, but was successful on nearly 75% of his attempts inside 45 yards. In addition, he never missed a last minute game tying or winning field goal. His 42-yard field goal in New Orleans in the final moments of the 1983 season's final game gave the Rams a 26–24 win over the Saints and sent the Rams to the playoffs over the Saints. In 1989, he kicked a last second field goal in San Francisco to beat the 49ers 13–12, and in the 1989 NFC divisional playoff game, he made 2 fourth-quarter field goals in a swirling wind at the Meadowlands to enable the Rams to tie the Giants in a game the Rams eventually won in overtime.

He also made last minute field goals to beat the Cardinals in 1984, the 49ers in 1986, the Bears in 1986 (a 50 yarder), and the Cardinals in 1987, as well as an overtime winner vs. the Saints in 1989.

As of 2021, Lansford's 789 career points ranks 97th all-time in NFL scoring.

== Family ==
Lansford married Teresa Nelleson c. 1984/1985. He later married Jill Haus-Lansford.

== Career regular season statistics ==
Career high/best bold

| Season | Team | G | FGM | FGA | % | LNG | XPM | XPA | % | PTS |
|---|---|---|---|---|---|---|---|---|---|---|
| 1982 | RAM | 9 | 9 | 15 | 60.0 | 39 | 23 | 24 | 95.8 | 50 |
| 1983 | RAM | 4 | 6 | 9 | 66.7 | 49 | 9 | 9 | 100.0 | 27 |
| 1984 | RAM | 16 | 25 | 33 | 75.8 | 50 | 37 | 38 | 97.4 | 112 |
| 1985 | RAM | 16 | 22 | 29 | 75.9 | 52 | 38 | 39 | 97.4 | 104 |
| 1986 | RAM | 16 | 17 | 24 | 70.8 | 50 | 34 | 35 | 97.1 | 85 |
| 1987 | RAM | 15 | 17 | 21 | 81.0 | 48 | 36 | 38 | 94.7 | 87 |
| 1988 | RAM | 16 | 24 | 32 | 75.0 | 49 | 45 | 48 | 93.8 | 117 |
| 1989 | RAM | 16 | 23 | 30 | 76.7 | 48 | 51 | 51 | 100.0 | 120 |
| 1990 | RAM | 16 | 15 | 24 | 62.5 | 46 | 42 | 43 | 97.7 | 87 |
| Career | | 124 | 158 | 217 | 72.8 | 52 | 315 | 325 | 96.9 | 789 |
