= Chet Pudloski =

American football player (1915–1990)

- Pudloski, circa 1944

No. 44, 40, 30, 24
- Position: Tackle

Personal information
- Born: August 3, 1915; Wilkes-Barre, Pennsylvania, U.S.
- Died: August 28, 1990 (aged 75); Hoffman Estates, Illinois, U.S.
- Listed height: 6 ft 1 in (1.85 m)
- Listed weight: 210 lb (95 kg)

Career information
- High school: James M. Coughlin (Wilkes-Barre)
- College: Long Island University (1939)

Career history
- Cleveland Rams (1944); Scranton Miners (1946); Wilkes-Barre Barons (1947)
- Stats at Pro Football Reference

Chester Edward Pudloski (August 3, 1915 – August 28, 1990) was an American professional football tackle who played for the Cleveland Rams of the National Football League (NFL). He played college football at Long Island University.

== Early life ==
Chester Edward Pudloski was born on August 3, 1915, in Wilkes-Barre, Pennsylvania. He played high school football at James M. Coughlin High School in Wilkes-Barre from 1931 to 1934.

== College career ==
Pudloski was on the freshman football team at Villanova University in 1935. He was also a guard on the basketball team.

Pudloski then worked as a railroad freight checker for several years before playing college football at Long Island University in 1939 under head coach Clair Bee. Pudloski left school in 1940.

== Professional career ==
Pudloski played football for the Electric Boat Diesels of New London, Connecticut from 1940 to 1943.

Pudloski started all ten games at tackle for the Cleveland Rams of the National Football League (NFL) during the 1944 NFL season. The Rams finished the year with a 4–6 record. In February 1945, it was reported that the Rams had lost Pudloski to the United States Army.

Pudloski played for the Scranton Miners of the American Football League (AFL) in 1946. He appeared in five games, starting two, for the AFL's Wilkes-Barre Barons in 1947.

== Personal life ==
Pudloski died on August 28, 1990, in Hoffman Estates, Illinois.
