= Jerry Latin =

American football player (1953–2025)

No. 32
- Position: Running back

Personal information
- Born: August 25, 1953; Chidester, Arkansas, U.S.
- Died: February 19, 2025 (aged 71); Rockford, Illinois, U.S.
- Listed height: 5 ft 10 in (1.78 m)
- Listed weight: 190 lb (86 kg)

Career information
- High school: Rockford East (Rockford, Illinois)
- College: Northern Illinois
- NFL draft: 1975: 11th round, 280th overall pick

Career history
- St. Louis Cardinals (1975–1978); Los Angeles Rams (1978)
- Stats at Pro Football Reference

Jerry Louis Latin (August 25, 1953 – February 19, 2025) was an American professional football player who was a running back for the St. Louis Cardinals and Los Angeles Rams of the National Football League (NFL). He played college football for the Northern Illinois Huskies.

== Biography ==
Latin was born on August 25, 1953, in Prescott, Arkansas, but he moved with his family to Rockford, Illinois, at an early age. He graduated from Rockford East High School, in Rockford, before attending Northern Illinois University in DeKalb, Illinois, where he played for the Huskies.

Latin was chosen by the St. Louis Cardinals in the 11th round of the 1975 NFL draft. He played four seasons with the Cardinals, from 1975 to 1978 and also traded to the Los Angeles Rams in 1978.

Latin died on February 19, 2025, at the age of 71.
