= Doug Bartlett (American football) =

American football player (born 1963)

No. 95
- Positions: Defensive tackle, defensive end

Personal information
- Born: May 22, 1963 (age 63); Springfield, Illinois, U.S.
- Listed height: 6 ft 2 in (1.88 m)
- Listed weight: 250 lb (113 kg)

Career information
- High school: Sacred Heart-Griffin (Springfield)
- College: Northern Illinois
- NFL draft: 1987: 4th round, 91st overall pick

Career history
- Los Angeles Rams (1987–1988); Philadelphia Eagles (1988); Green Bay Packers (1989)*
- * Offseason or practice squad member only

Career NFL statistics
- Sacks: 1
- Stats at Pro Football Reference

Douglas William Bartlett (born May 22, 1963) is an American former professional football player who was a defensive tackle and defensive end in the National Football League (NFL). He played college football for the Northern Illinois Huskies and was selected by the Los Angeles Rams in the fourth round of the 1987 NFL draft with the 91st overall pick. He played for the Philadelphia Eagles in 1988.

Pre-draft measurables
Height	Weight	Arm length	Hand span	40-yard dash	10-yard split	20-yard split	20-yard shuttle	Vertical jump	Broad jump	Bench press
6 ft 2 1/4 in (1.89 m)	250 lb (113 kg)	30 3/4 in (0.78 m)	9 3/4 in (0.25 m)	4.75 s	1.55 s	2.68 s	4.12 s	31.0 in (0.79 m)	9 ft 4 in (2.84 m)	31 reps
All values from NFL Combine
