= Hudson Houck =

American football player and coach (born 1943)

Profile
- Position: Center

Personal information
- Born: January 7, 1943 (age 83); Los Angeles, California, U.S.

Career information
- College: USC

Career history
- Crescenta Valley HS (CA) (1966, 1969) Assistant coach; USC (1970–1971) Freshmen coach; Stanford (1972–1975) Offensive line coach; USC (1976–1982) Offensive line coach; Los Angeles Rams (1983–1991) Offensive line coach; Seattle Seahawks (1992) Offensive line coach; Dallas Cowboys (1993–2001) Offensive line coach; San Diego Chargers (2002–2004) Offensive line coach; Miami Dolphins (2005–2007) Offensive line coach; Dallas Cowboys (2008–2011) Offensive line coach; Dallas Cowboys (2018–2019) Offensive consultant

Awards and highlights
- 2× Super Bowl champion (XXVIII, XXX)

Hudson Houck (born January 7, 1943) is an American former professional football coach who was an offensive line coach in the National Football League (NFL) for 40 years.

== Playing career and coaching beginnings ==
Houck attended and graduated from Eagle Rock High School in Los Angeles. In 1960 he was selected first string All City Center.

Houck was a center for the Trojans of Southern California from 1962 to 1964. He won a national championship as a member of the 1962 team.

He began his coaching career as an assistant coach for Crescenta Valley High School in California. Following two years in the United States Army, Houck resumed his role at Crescenta Valley.

In 1970 Houck coached the freshmen team at Southern California, and after two years he became the offensive line coach at Stanford. There he coached the first Stanford 2-time All-Pac-8 offensive guard and Hall of Famer, Alex Karakozoff and sent several players to the NFL including Gary Anderson, Bill Reid and tutoring eventual All-American and first round NFL draft pick Gordon King.

Houck returned to his alma mater in 1976, coaching the offensive line at Southern California. During this time, he helped send numerous Trojans to the National Football League including Marvin Powell, Pat Howell, Brad Budde, Anthony Muñoz, Keith Van Horne, Chris Foote, Roy Foster, Bruce Matthews, Don Mosebar and Tony Slaton, among others. This group helped lead the way for Heisman Trophy-winning running backs Charles White and Marcus Allen, in addition to another USC great, Ricky Bell, an NFL first-round draft choice in 1977.

== Pro coaching career ==
Houck's first pro coaching experience came with the Los Angeles Rams, where he coached the offensive line from 1983 to 1991.

Over that time with the Rams, there were seven different individual 1,000-yard rushing seasons and four individual league rushing titles, including an NFL-record 2,105 yards by Eric Dickerson in 1984. Over that stretch, five different Rams offensive linemen were voted to a combined 21 Pro Bowls, including Jackie Slater (7 trips), Doug Smith (6), Kent Hill (3), Dennis Harrah (3) and Tom Newberry (2). In the final three years of Houck's tenure with the Rams, quarterback Jim Everett passed for more yards than any other signal caller over this span, and he also did not miss a start from 1988 to 1991 in part due to the pass protection by Houck's blockers.

Houck spent one season as offensive line coach for the Seattle Seahawks in 1992. Seahawks running back Chris Warren logged the first 1,000-yard rushing season of his career with Houck tutoring his blockers.

Houck spent the next nine years coaching the offensive line for the Dallas Cowboys. At times during Houck's tenure the Cowboys' line was one of the most dominant in the history of the game. The 203 sacks they allowed in nine years under Houck were the fewest of any NFL team in that span. Six offensive linemen earned 22 trips to the Pro Bowl under Houck, including Larry Allen (7), Nate Newton (5), Erik Williams (4), Ray Donaldson (2), Mark Stepnoski (2) and Mark Tuinei (2). Hall of Fame running back Emmitt Smith earned a pair of rushing titles during Houck's tenure, and rushed for over 1,000 yards every season. He was also the assistant head coach from 1994 to 1997.

After the firing of Chan Gailey in 2000, he was considered as one of the candidates to take over the head coaching duties of the Dallas Cowboys, which eventually went to Dave Campo.

With the San Diego Chargers from 2002 to 2004, Houck transformed one of the league's worst offensive lines to one of the best. Running back LaDainian Tomlinson rushed for more than 1,300 yards in each of Houck's three seasons with the team. With five new starters on the line in 2004, the Chargers ranked tenth in total offense and sixth in rushing. The Chargers allowed fewer than 25 sacks per season under Houck.

Houck was hired to work for the Miami Dolphins head coach Nick Saban. During his first year with the Dolphins in 2005, Houck's offensive line ranked fourth in the NFL in fewest sacks allowed. In 2007, Houck was reunited with then Dolphins head coach Cam Cameron. Houck and Cameron worked together in San Diego when Cameron was offensive coordinator for the Chargers.

After the Dolphins' 1-15 2007 season, Houck was fired along with most of the Dolphins' coaching staff by incoming Vice President of Football Operations Bill Parcells. Jerry Jones re-hired Houck when Parcells hired Cowboys line coach Tony Sparano to serve as the Dolphins' head coach.
