= Alonzo Williams =

American football player (born 1963)

No. 31
- Position: Running back

Personal information
- Born: August 9, 1963 (age 63); Los Angeles, California, U.S.
- Listed height: 5 ft 9 in (1.75 m)
- Listed weight: 192 lb (87 kg)

Career information
- High school: Morningside
- College: Mesa State
- NFL draft: 1987: 12th round, 326th overall pick

Career history
- Los Angeles Rams (1987)

Career NFL statistics
- Rushing yards: 9
- Rushing average: 4.5
- Return yards: 114
- Stats at Pro Football Reference

Alonzo Fitzgerald Williams (born August 9, 1963), also known as "Lonnie", is an American former professional football player who was a running back in the National Football League (NFL). He was selected in the 12th round and played for the Los Angeles Rams in 1987. He played college football for the Colorado Mesa Mavericks where he earned first-team All-American status in the National Assn. of Intercollegiate Athletics.

Williams served a 30-year prison term for a "robbery spree". He was released early in 2020.
