= Tom Taylor (American football) =

American football player (born 1962)

No. 62
- Position: Guard

Personal information
- Born: September 14, 1962 (age 64); Acton, California, U.S.

Career information
- College: Georgia Tech
- NFL draft: 1984: undrafted

Career history
- Los Angeles Rams (1984)*; Los Angeles Rams (1987)
- * Offseason or practice squad member only

Career NFL statistics
- Games played: 3
- Stats at Pro Football Reference

Thomas Joseph Taylor (born September 14, 1962) is an American former professional football player who was a guard for the Los Angeles Rams of the National Football League (NFL). He played college football for the Georgia Tech Yellow Jackets.
