= Ed Zeman =

American football player (born 1963)

No. 32, 41
- Positions: Wide receiver, defensive back

Personal information
- Born: September 25, 1963 (age 63); Denver, Colorado, U.S.
- Listed height: 6 ft 0 in (1.83 m)
- Listed weight: 190 lb (86 kg)

Career information
- High school: Monta Vista (Cupertino, California)
- College: Fort Lewis
- NFL draft: 1986: undrafted

Career history
- Chicago Bears (1986)*; Los Angeles Rams (1987); Los Angeles Cobras (1988)
- * Offseason or practice squad member only

Career NFL statistics
- Games played: 3
- Stats at Pro Football Reference

Career AFL statistics
- Receptions: 6
- Receiving yards: 41
- Tackles: 25
- Interceptions: 1
- Stats at ArenaFan.com

Ed Zeman (born September 25, 1963) is an American former professional football player in the National Football League (NFL). He played college football for the Fort Lewis Skyhawks. In 1987, he was a member of the Los Angeles Rams of the NFL. In 1988, he played for the Los Angeles Cobras of the Arena Football League (AFL).
