= Bernard Quarles =

American gridiron football player (born 1960)

No. 9
- Position: Quarterback

Personal information
- Born: January 4, 1960 (age 66); Los Angeles, California, U.S.
- Listed height: 6 ft 2 in (1.88 m)
- Listed weight: 215 lb (98 kg)

Career information
- College: UCLA, Hawaii

Career history
- 1983–1984: Calgary Stampeders
- 1985: Ottawa Rough Riders
- 1986: Saskatchewan Roughriders
- 1987: Los Angeles Rams
- Stats at Pro Football Reference

Bernard Darwin Quarles (born January 4, 1960) is an American former professional football quarterback in the National Football League (NFL) and Canadian Football League (CFL).

== Career ==
Quarles played quarterback while attending Jefferson High School in Los Angeles. He played for the Calgary Stampeders from 1983 to 1984, followed by the Ottawa Rough Riders and the Saskatchewan Roughriders. He also served as a replacement player for the Los Angeles Rams during the 1987 NFL strike.
