= Damone Johnson =

American football player (born 1962)

No. 86
- Position: Tight end

Personal information
- Born: March 2, 1962 (age 64); Los Angeles, California, U.S.
- Listed height: 6 ft 4 in (1.93 m)
- Listed weight: 230 lb (104 kg)

Career information
- High school: Santa Monica (Santa Monica, California)
- College: Cal Poly
- NFL draft: 1985: 6th round, 162nd overall pick

Career history
- Los Angeles Rams (1986–1992)

Career NFL statistics
- Receptions: 132
- Receiving yards: 1,015
- Touchdowns: 18
- Stats at Pro Football Reference

Damone Johnson (born March 2, 1962) is an American former professional football player who was a tight end for seven seasons with the Los Angeles Rams of the National Football League (NFL). He played college football for the Cal Poly Mustangs.

== Early life ==
Johnson graduated from Santa Monica High School and played collegiately at California Polytechnic State University, San Luis Obispo, where he played four seasons and finished with 109 receptions for 1,632 yards and 10 touchdowns.

He earned All-Western Football Conference selection in 1983. After his Cal Poly career in 1984, Johnson ranked second in school history for both receptions and receiving yards.

== Professional career ==
After being selected by the Los Angeles Rams in the sixth round of the 1985 NFL draft, Johnson spent his rookie season on injured reserve due to a knee injury suffered in training camp. In 1986, a shoulder injury kept him sidelined for most of the season before he was activated from injured reserve and played in the team's final five games, though he did not catch a pass.

Johnson's first significant playing time came when he caught six passes for 69 yards (ultimately both single-game career highs) in the Rams' 30–17 loss to the Cleveland Browns on Monday Night Football. Playing in 12 games and starting in five, Johnson became the Rams' leading pass catcher among tight ends with 21 receptions for 198 yards and two touchdowns.

Becoming a full-time starter at tight end, Johnson's best season came in 1988, when he caught 42 passes for 350 yards and scored six touchdowns, all single-season highs for his career. In the final game of the regular season that year, Johnson caught four passes for 42 yards and a career-high three touchdowns in a 38–16 win over the eventual Super Bowl champion San Francisco 49ers. Johnson played four more seasons with the Rams, and at the end of his career, he held the record for most touchdown receptions by a tight end in team history.
