= Aaron Cox =

American football player (born 1965)

No. 84, 80
- Position: Wide receiver

Personal information
- Born: March 1, 1965 (age 61); Los Angeles, California, U.S.
- Listed height: 5 ft 9 in (1.75 m)
- Listed weight: 174 lb (79 kg)

Career information
- High school: Susan Miller Dorsey (Los Angeles)
- College: Arizona State
- NFL draft: 1988: 1st round, 20th overall pick

Career history
- Los Angeles Rams (1988–1992); Indianapolis Colts (1993)

Awards and highlights
- 2× First-team All-Pac-10 (1986, 1987); Second-team All-Pac-10 (1985)

Career NFL statistics
- Receptions: 102
- Receiving yards: 1,732
- Receiving touchdowns: 8
- Stats at Pro Football Reference

Aaron Cox (born March 13, 1965) is an American former professional football player who was a wide receiver in the National Football League (NFL). He played college football for the Arizona State Sun Devils. He played in the NFL for the Los Angeles Rams and the Indianapolis Colts.

== Early life ==
Cox was born in Los Angeles, California and graduated from Susan Miller Dorsey High School. He attended Arizona State University. He was a highly productive receiver in college, finishing his career with 2,353 yards.

- 1985: 40 catches for 788 yards with 5 TD.
- 1986: 35 catches for 695 yards with 2 TD.
- 1987: 42 catches for 870 yards with 5 TD.

== Professional career ==
Cox was selected by the Los Angeles Rams in the first round of the 1988 NFL draft. He played professionally for six seasons. His most productive season was his rookie year, when he caught 28 receptions for 590 yards and five touchdowns. He never lived up to his first-round billing, as one of the draft choices acquired by the Rams, in the trade that sent Cornelius Bennett to the Buffalo Bills.
