= Fred Strickland =

American football player (born 1966)

No. 53, 55
- Position: Linebacker

Personal information
- Born: August 15, 1966 (age 60); Buffalo, New York, U.S.
- Listed height: 6 ft 3 in (1.91 m)
- Listed weight: 246 lb (112 kg)

Career information
- High school: Lakeland Regional (Wanaque, New Jersey)
- College: Purdue
- NFL draft: 1988: 2nd round, 47th overall pick

Career history
- Los Angeles Rams (1988–1992); Minnesota Vikings (1993); Green Bay Packers (1994–1995); Dallas Cowboys (1996–1998); Washington Redskins (1999)

Awards and highlights
- First-team All-Big Ten (1987); Second-team All-Big Ten (1986)

Career NFL statistics
- Total tackles: 712
- Sacks: 8.5
- Forced fumbles: 1
- Fumble recoveries: 11
- Interceptions: 4
- Stats at Pro Football Reference

Fredrick William Strickland Jr. (born August 15, 1966) is an American former professional football player who was a linebacker in the National Football League (NFL) for the Los Angeles Rams, Minnesota Vikings, Green Bay Packers, Dallas Cowboys and Washington Redskins. He played college football for the Purdue Boilermakers.

== Early life ==
Raised in Wanaque, New Jersey, Strickland attended Lakeland Regional High School, where he was a two-way player (linebacker and fullback). He earned honorable-mention high school All-American honors as a senior. He also practiced basketball.

He accepted a football scholarship from Purdue University. He became a starter as a sophomore, finishing fourth in the conference with 132 tackles (89 solo).

As a junior, he was second in the conference with 140 tackles (80 solo). As a senior, he led the conference in tackles with 130, earning All-Big Ten honors. He appeared in the Blue-Gray Game.

He was a three-year starter and would lead the team in tackles for three straight years. He finished his college career in second place in school history in total tackles (479) and first place in solo tackles (321); he also led the Boilermakers in tackles in three straight seasons (1985–87).

== Professional career ==
=== Los Angeles Rams ===
Strickland was selected by the Los Angeles Rams in the second round (47th overall) of the 1988 NFL draft. As a rookie, he was a backup linebacker, tallying 43 tackles (34 solo) and 4 sacks. He had 2 sacks in the season finale against the San Francisco 49ers and in the playoff loss against the Minnesota Vikings.

In 1989, he suffered a right knee injury early in training camp, missing all of the preseason and the season opener. He still was able to become a starter at inside linebacker, registering 63 tackles (fifth on the team), 2 sacks, 2 interceptions and 6 passes defensed. He missed 3 games with an ankle injury he suffered in the sixth game against the Buffalo Bills. He had 10 tackles and 2 interceptions in the season finale against the New England Patriots.

In 1990, the Rams took advantage of his versatility as a player, creating a position called "nose linebacker", that rushed the quarterback, dropped back in coverage and took on offensive lineman in the running game. On October 15, he was placed on the injured reserve list with a fractured left fibula. He was fourth on the team with 25 tackles at the time.

In 1991, he made 29 tackles (23 solo), one sack, 2 passes defensed and one forced fumble. He missed 2 games after suffering a sprained knee in the second game against the New York Giants.

In 1992, he was passed on the depth chart at middle linebacker by Larry Kelm, playing mainly on special teams and short yardage situations. He collected 7 tackles and 8 special teams tackles.

=== Minnesota Vikings ===
On May 7, 1993, he was signed as a free agent by the Minnesota Vikings. He finished with 15 starts at weakside linebacker, 137 tackles (second on the team) and 4 fumble recoveries (tied for second on the league), on a defense that was ranked number 1 in the league.

=== Green Bay Packers ===
On June 23, 1994, after the retirement of linebackers Johnny Holland and Brian Noble, he was signed as a free agent by the Green Bay Packers, reuniting with his former Los Angeles Rams defensive coordinator Fritz Shurmur. He was named the starter at middle linebacker, posting 88 tackles (second on the team).

The next year he had 72 tackles. He missed 2 games after suffering a sprained left medial collateral ligament in the fourteenth game against the Cleveland Browns.

=== Dallas Cowboys ===
In 1996, after losing linebackers Robert Jones and Dixon Edwards to free agency, the Dallas Cowboys signed him as a free agent on March 11. He was named the starter at middle linebacker and recorded 153 tackles (led the team) on a defense that was ranked third in the league. On November 24, he had a career-high 20 tackles against the New York Giants.

In 1997, he was limited with injuries, but still tallied 132 tackles (fourth on the team) and 2 fumble recoveries (tied for the team lead). In 1998, he registered 117 tackles (third on the team). On February 11, 1999, he was released after the team decided to start third year player Randall Godfrey.

=== Washington Redskins ===
On March 27, 1999, he signed with the Washington Redskins as a free agent. He was the backup at middle linebacker to Derek Smith, before being placed on the injured reserve list on October 26. The next year, he was tried at outside linebacker, until being released before the start of the season.

Strickland played 12 seasons in the NFL; appearing in 161 games (111 starts) and finishing with 580 tackles, 8.5 sacks, 4 interceptions and 11 fumble recoveries.

He retired soon after.

== Personal life ==
Strickland is the cousin of professional wrestler Swerve Strickland.
