= Tim Tyrrell =

American football player (born 1961)

No. 32, 23
- Position: Running back

Personal information
- Born: February 19, 1961 (age 65); Chicago, Illinois, U.S.
- Listed height: 6 ft 1 in (1.85 m)
- Listed weight: 204 lb (93 kg)

Career information
- High school: James B. Conant (Hoffman Estates, Illinois)
- College: Northern Illinois
- NFL draft: 1984: undrafted

Career history
- Atlanta Falcons (1984–1986); Los Angeles Rams (1986–1988); Pittsburgh Steelers (1989)

Awards and highlights
- Vern Smith Leadership Award (1983)

Career NFL statistics
- Rushing attempts–yards: 12–47
- Receptions–yards: 7–68
- Touchdowns: 0
- Stats at Pro Football Reference

Timothy Gordan Tyrrell (born February 19, 1961) is an American former professional football player who was a running back in the National Football League (NFL) for seven seasons. He played for the Atlanta Falcons from 1984 to 1986, the Los Angeles Rams from 1986 to 1988, and the Pittsburgh Steelers in 1989. He played college football for the Northern Illinois Huskies.
