= Gil Haskell =

American football coach (born 1943)

Personal information
- Born: September 24, 1943 (age 83)

Career information
- High school: St. Ignatius College Preparatory
- College: San Francisco State

Career history

Coaching
- St. Ignatius College Preparatory (1973–1977) Head coach; USC (1978–1982) Assistant coach; Los Angeles Rams (1983–1991); Special teams coordinator (1983–1986); Running backs coach (1987–1990); Special teams coordinator & tight ends coach (1991); Green Bay Packers (1992–1997); Running backs coach (1992–1994); Wide receivers coach (1995–1997); Carolina Panthers (1998–1999) Offensive coordinator; Seattle Seahawks (2000–2008) Offensive coordinator

Operations
- Cleveland Browns (2010–2012) Senior advisor to the president

Awards and highlights
- Super Bowl champion (XXXI); National champion (1978)
- Coaching profile at Pro Football Reference

Gil Haskell (born September 24, 1943) is an American former football coach. A longtime assistant coach in the National Football League (NFL), he served as the offensive coordinator for the Seattle Seahawks from 2000 to 2008. He began his career in the NFL as a ball boy with the San Francisco 49ers while his uncle, William O'Grady, was a part owner of the franchise. Haskell grew up in St. Brendan's Parish in San Francisco and graduated from St. Ignatius College Preparatory in 1961. He played college football at San Francisco State University where he graduated from in 1966. He then coached football and track and field at both Archbishop Riordan High School from 1966 to 1968 and St. Ignatius from 1969 to 1977 where he was head coach of the football team. Haskell was later recognized by the San Francisco Prep Hall of Fame for his coaching contributions at both schools in 2018. Haskell then left for University of Southern California (USC), spending five seasons there as an assistant coach. He broke into the NFL as a coach in 1983 with the Los Angeles Rams, coaching special teams, running backs and tight ends for nine seasons. In 1992, he joined the Green Bay Packers where he became part of Mike Holmgren's staff for the first time as a running back coach and wide receiver coach. When Holmgren left Green Bay for the Seattle Seahawks in 1998, Haskell accepted the offensive coordinator position with the Carolina Panthers. In 2000, he reunited with Holmgren in Seattle in the same role. He has indicated that he would like to be a head coach in the NFL and even launched a low key campaign for the Oakland Raiders position when the Raiders fired Norv Turner after the 2005 season. That position was eventually filled with the hiring of Art Shell.

On February 10, 2010, the Cleveland Browns announced that Haskell as the senior advisor to president Mike Holmgren.

Haskell and his late wife, Nancy, have four daughters: Paula, Patty, Jenny and Julie.

== NFC Championship Game injury ==
In the 1995 NFC Championship game between the Packers and the Dallas Cowboys, Haskell was involved in a sideline collision where he was knocked backward and hit the back of his head against the carpet-covered concrete sideline of Dallas' Texas Stadium. Haskell was unresponsive for five minutes before he started to move, and was carted off in an ambulance. The impact of Haskell's head was enough to fracture the back of his skull and cause a contusion in the front of his brain. He was able to fully recover and was discharged from the hospital after less than 2 weeks.
