= Shawn Miller (American football) =

American football player (born 1961)

No. 98
- Position: Defensive end

Personal information
- Born: March 14, 1961 (age 65); Ogden, Utah, U.S.
- Listed height: 6 ft 4 in (1.93 m)
- Listed weight: 255 lb (116 kg)

Career information
- High school: Weber
- College: Utah State
- NFL draft: 1984: undrafted

Career history
- Los Angeles Rams (1984–1989); Green Bay Packers (1990)*
- * Offseason or practice squad member only

Career NFL statistics
- Sacks: 21
- Interceptions: 1
- Fumble recoveries: 2
- Stats at Pro Football Reference

Shawn Vernon Miller (born March 14, 1961) is an American former professional football player who was a defensive end in the National Football League (NFL). He was signed by the Los Angeles Rams as an undrafted free agent in 1984. He played college football for the Utah State Aggies.
