= Tony Slaton =

American football player (born 1961)

No. 61, 65
- Position: Center

Personal information
- Born: April 12, 1961 (age 65); Merced, California, U.S.
- Listed height: 6 ft 3 in (1.91 m)
- Listed weight: 265 lb (120 kg)

Career information
- High school: Merced
- College: USC
- NFL draft: 1984: 6th round, 155th overall pick

Career history
- Buffalo Bills (1984)*; Los Angeles Rams (1985–1989); Dallas Cowboys (1990)
- * Offseason or practice squad member only

Awards and highlights
- Consensus All-American (1983); Third-team All-American (1982); 3× First-team All-Pac-10 (1981–1983)

Career NFL statistics
- Games played: 74
- Games started: 25
- Fumble recoveries: 1
- Stats at Pro Football Reference

Tony Tyrone Slaton (born April 12, 1961) is an American former professional football player who was a center in the National Football League (NFL) for the Los Angeles Rams and Dallas Cowboys. He played college football for the USC Trojans, earning consensus All-American honors in 1983.

== Early life ==
Slaton was born in Merced, California. He attended Merced High School. As a senior, he was an All-conference, All-Northern California and All-state offensive tackle. He also practiced basketball.

Slaton accepted a football scholarship from the University of Southern California. As a freshman, he was a backup at offensive guard.

As a sophomore, he became a starter at center and contributed to Marcus Allen winning the Heisman Trophy, after rushing for 2,427 yards. At the time, his size was an exception at the position, as the other centers usually had a smaller build.

As a junior, he was part of an offensive line that included future NFL players Bruce Matthews and Don Mosebar.

As a senior, he was named a team captain and received consensus first-team All-American honors. He was also invited to play in the Hula Bowl and Japan Bowl.

== Professional career ==
=== Buffalo Bills ===
Slaton was selected by the Buffalo Bills in the sixth round (155th overall) of the 1984 NFL draft. He was waived on August 20.

=== Los Angeles Rams ===
In 1984, he was signed as a free agent by the Los Angeles Rams, reuniting with head coach John Robinson, who was his college coach. He was on the active roster for the first three games, before suffering an abdominal strain and being placed on the injured reserve list on September 21.

On August 20, 1985, he was released before the start of the season. On September 19, he was re-signed after several players on the offensive line suffered injuries. He contributed to the divisional championship team, starting in place for injured center Doug Smith in 5 regular-season games, including the final three regular-season games and both playoff games. In the divisional round playoff game against the Dallas Cowboys, he contributed to Eric Dickerson running for a playoff record 248 yards. The Rams were shut out in the NFC championship game against the legendary Chicago Bears defense of '85.

In 1986, he appeared in 14 games as a backup center. In 1988, he appeared in 15 games, starting one game at right guard in place of an injured Duval Love.

In 1989, he started 15 games at right guard. In the wild card playoff game against the Philadelphia Eagles, he helped Greg Bell rush for 124 yards in 23 carries (5.4-yard avg.).

=== Dallas Cowboys ===
On March 3, 1990, the Dallas Cowboys signed Slaton as a Plan B free agent. He started the first 4 games of the season at right guard and appeared in a total of 6 games. He was passed on the depth chart by John Gesek. On October 18, he was placed on the injured reserve with a lower back strain. He was released on December 17, 1990.

== Personal life ==
Slaton and his wife Vicki reside in Merced CA, raised a son and his nephew, and have one grandson. He worked as the executive director at the Boys & Girls Clubs of Merced County in Merced and participated in other local youth development initiatives, before retiring in 2018.
