= Mike Piel =

American football player (born 1965)

No. 95
- Position: Defensive end

Personal information
- Born: September 21, 1965 (age 61); El Toro, California, U.S.
- Listed height: 6 ft 4 in (1.93 m)
- Listed weight: 263 lb (119 kg)

Career information
- High school: El Toro (Lake Forest, California)
- College: Illinois
- NFL draft: 1988: 3rd round, 82nd overall pick

Career history
- Los Angeles Rams (1988–1992)

Awards and highlights
- Second-team All-Big Ten (1987)

Career NFL statistics
- Sacks: 13
- Fumble recoveries: 3
- Stats at Pro Football Reference

Michael Lloyd Piel (born September 21, 1965) is an American former professional football player who was a defensive end for four seasons for the Los Angeles Rams. He was selected by the Rams in the third round of the 1988 NFL draft with the 82nd overall pick. He played college football at the University of Illinois, Urbana. Piel suffered shoulder problems during much of his professional career.
