= Vince Newsome =

American football player and executive (born 1961)

Baltimore Ravens
- Title: Director of pro personnel

Personal information
- Born: January 22, 1961 (age 65); Braintree, Essex, England
- Listed height: 6 ft 1 in (1.85 m)
- Listed weight: 180 lb (82 kg)

Career information
- High school: Vacaville (Vacaville, California, U.S.)
- College: Washington
- NFL draft: 1983: 4th round, 97th overall pick

Career history

Playing
- Los Angeles Rams (1983–1990); Cleveland Browns (1991–1992)

Operations
- Baltimore Ravens (2009-present)

Awards and highlights
- Super Bowl champion (XLVII)

Career NFL statistics
- Interceptions: 16
- Interception yards: 313
- Sacks: 1
- Stats at Pro Football Reference

Vincent Karl Newsome (born January 22, 1961) is a former American football safety. He currently works in the front office for the Baltimore Ravens as the director of pro personnel, which is a position he has held since a 2009 promotion.
