= Doug Smith (offensive lineman) =

American football player (born 1956)

No. 56
- Positions: Center, guard

Personal information
- Born: November 25, 1956 (age 69); Columbus, Ohio, U.S.
- Listed height: 6 ft 3 in (1.91 m)
- Listed weight: 259 lb (117 kg)

Career information
- High school: Northland (Columbus)
- College: Bowling Green
- NFL draft: 1978: undrafted

Career history
- Los Angeles Rams (1978–1991)

Awards and highlights
- 6× Pro Bowl (1984–1989)

Career NFL statistics
- Games played: 187
- Games Started: 160
- Fumble recoveries: 6
- Stats at Pro Football Reference

Carl Douglas Smith (born November 25, 1956) is an American former professional football player who was a center and offensive guard for the Los Angeles Rams of the National Football League (NFL) from the 1978 through 1991. Smith played college football for the Bowling Green Falcons in Bowling Green, Ohio. He graduated from Northland High School in Columbus on June 9, 1974.

== Rams career ==
After serving in a backup role for 4 years, Smith replaced Rich Saul as the starting center in 1982. In that 1982 to 1991 span, the Rams made the playoffs 6 times: 1983 to 1986, 1988, and 1989. Los Angeles won a wild card game in the 1983–84 NFL playoffs against the Dallas Cowboys, as Smith with guards Kent Hill and Dennis Harrah and with tackles Bill Bain and Jackie Slater led Eric Dickerson to 99 rushing yards, but lost to the Washington Redskins in the divisional round. In the 1984–85 NFL playoffs, Los Angeles lost in the divisional round again, this time to the New York Giants. In the 1985–86 NFL playoffs, Smith was replaced by Tony Slaton as the Rams won a divisional round game against the Cowboys, but were shut out in the NFC championship game by the legendary Chicago Bears defense of '85. In the 1986–87 NFL playoffs, the Rams lost a wild card game to the Redskins, as Smith, Harrah, and left guard Tom Newberry had a somewhat difficult time against their defensive line, rushing 41 times for 138 yards. In the 1988–89 NFL playoffs, the Rams lost a wild card game to the Minnesota Vikings. In the 1989–90 NFL playoffs, the Rams defeated the Philadelphia Eagles in the wild card game and the Giants in the divisional round, but lost to the San Francisco 49ers in the NFC championship game. In the Philly game, Smith, with Newberry and Slaton at guards, Irv Pankey and Slater at tackles, helped Greg Bell rush for 124 yards in 23 carries. In the Giant game, the same offensive line (except for Duval Love replacing Slaton at right guard), led Bell to 87 yards rushing in 19 carries in their over-time victory. Then the Rams plummeted to 5–11 and 3–13 won-lost records in 1990 and 1991. In 1992, Smith was replaced by Bern Brostek.
