= Mickey Sutton (cornerback) =

American gridiron football player (born 1960)

No. 27, 49, 20, 30
- Position: Cornerback

Personal information
- Born: August 28, 1960 (age 66); Greenville, Mississippi
- Listed height: 5 ft 8 in (1.73 m)
- Listed weight: 165 lb (75 kg)

Career information
- High school: Union City (CA) Logan
- College: Montana
- NFL draft: 1983: undrafted

Career history
- Hamilton Tiger-Cats (1983); Pittsburgh Maulers (1984); Birmingham Stallions (1985); Los Angeles Rams (1986–1988); Green Bay Packers (1989); Buffalo Bills (1989); Los Angeles Rams (1990)

Career NFL statistics
- Games played: 65
- Games started: 7
- Fumble recoveries: 4
- Interceptions: 5
- Stats at Pro Football Reference

William Earl "Mickey" Sutton (born August 28, 1960) is a former professional cornerback in the Canadian Football League (CFL), the United States Football League (USFL), and the National Football League (NFL). After playing college football for Chabot Junior College and Montana, Sutton signed with the CFL's Hamilton Tiger-Cats (1983), and the USFL's Pittsburgh Maulers (1984) and Birmingham Stallions (1985). Sutton played five seasons in the NFL for the Los Angeles Rams (1986–1988, 1990), the Buffalo Bills (1989), and the Green Bay Packers (1989).

He is the father of Will Sutton.
