= Anthony Newman (American football) =

American football player (born 1965)

No. 26, 30
- Position: Safety

Personal information
- Born: November 21, 1965 (age 60); Bellingham, Washington, U.S.
- Listed height: 6 ft 0 in (1.83 m)
- Listed weight: 203 lb (92 kg)

Career information
- High school: Beaverton (Beaverton, Oregon)
- College: Oregon
- NFL draft: 1988: 2nd round, 35th overall pick

Career history
- Los Angeles Rams (1988–1994); New Orleans Saints (1995–1997); Oakland Raiders (1998–1999)

Awards and highlights
- First-team All-Pac-10 (1987)

Career NFL statistics
- Interceptions: 21
- Interception yards: 256
- Touchdowns: 3
- Stats at Pro Football Reference

Anthony Newman (born November 21, 1965) is an American former professional football player who was a safety in the National Football League (NFL). Newman played for the Los Angeles Rams from 1988 to 1994, New Orleans Saints from 1995 to 1997, and the Oakland Raiders from 1998 to 1999. He was selected by the Rams in the second round of the 1988 NFL draft. Out of high school, he had the opportunity to play Major League Baseball but chose instead to attend the University of Oregon.

== Post-NFL career ==
After retiring from the NFL, Newman worked with the Oregon Sports Network. He was a commentator for Oregon Ducks football games. He worked alongside Joe Giansante color commentating on Oregon Duck football games until the conference expanded to the Pac-12 and launched their own sports network. He also helps coach the Central Catholic High School football team. Newman resides in Oregon with his wife, and his three children.

In 1994 Newman and J.J. Birden created the Anthony Q. Newman Foundation and began offering free football camps. These camps are no longer active, but Newman still runs the Anthony Newman Sports Camps that take place in the summer, spring, and winter. In 2019 Newman accepted the defensive coordinator position at Central Catholic H.S. in Portland, Oregon.
