= Larry Kelm =

American football player (1964–2014)

No. 52
- Position: Linebacker

Personal information
- Born: November 29, 1964; Corpus Christi, Texas, U.S.
- Died: November 22, 2014 (aged 49) near Laredo, Texas, U.S.
- Listed height: 6 ft 4 in (1.93 m)
- Listed weight: 236 lb (107 kg)

Career information
- High school: Richard King (Corpus Christi, Texas)
- College: Texas A&M
- NFL draft: 1987: 4th round, 108th overall pick

Career history
- Los Angeles Rams (1987–1992); San Francisco 49ers (1993)

Career NFL statistics
- Sacks: 2
- Interceptions: 3
- Fumble recoveries: 4
- Stats at Pro Football Reference

Larry Dean Kelm (November 29, 1964 – November 22, 2014) was an American professional football player from Corpus Christi, Texas, who played linebacker for seven seasons for the Los Angeles Rams and the San Francisco 49ers. He was selected by the Rams in the fourth round of the 1987 NFL draft.

== Death ==
On November 22, 2014, while deer hunting near Laredo, Texas, Kelm fell from a windmill he was using as a deer blind and died. R.C. Slocum, his coach while at Texas A&M was "heartbroken" by the news.

He died at age 49.
