= Michael Stewart (American football) =

American football player (born 1965)

No. 23, 35
- Position: Safety

Personal information
- Born: July 12, 1965 (age 61); Atascadero, California, U.S.
- Listed height: 5 ft 11 in (1.80 m)
- Listed weight: 202 lb (92 kg)

Career information
- High school: Bakersfield (Bakersfield, California)
- College: Fresno State
- NFL draft: 1987: 8th round, 213th overall pick

Career history
- Los Angeles Rams (1987–1993); Miami Dolphins (1994–1996)

Career NFL statistics
- Tackles: 602
- Sacks: 5
- Interceptions: 11
- Fumble recoveries: 10
- Stats at Pro Football Reference

Michael Anthony Stewart (born July 13, 1965) is an American former professional football player who was a safety for seven seasons in the National Football League (NFL) for the Los Angeles Rams. He then played three seasons for the Miami Dolphins. He was selected 213th overall by the Los Angeles Rams in the eighth round of the 1987 NFL draft.

Stewart was selected three times in Major League Baseball drafts but opted to play professional football after playing college football at Fresno State. He was drafted by the Rams in the eighth round in 1987. Converted from linebacker to safety by Fresno State coach Jim Sweeney, Stewart played as a safety and on special teams for the Rams.

In 1992, Stewart started all 16 games and was second on the team in tackles with 81. He had two interceptions, forced two fumbles and had a sack. He made a reported $270,000 in 1991 and when negotiations on a new contract began in 1992 he argued that he was worth about three times that much. The Rams originally offered a three-year deal worth about $650,000 a year, but by the time Stewart ended his holdout, he had settled for a $1.1 million, two-year deal.
