= Los Angeles Rams all-time roster (A–Kin) =

1,725 players have appeared in at least one regular season or postseason game in the National Football League (NFL) for the Los Angeles Rams franchise since 1936. This list includes those whose last names fall between "A" and "Kin". For the rest of the players, see Los Angeles Rams all-time roster (Kir–Z). This list is accurate through the end of the 2025 NFL season.

== A ==
- Oday Aboushi
- Chet Adams
- Davante Adams
- John Adams
- Victor Adeyanju
- Ben Agajanian
- Bob Agler
- Ray Agnew
- C. J. Ah You
- Chidi Ahanotu
- Hakim Akbar
- Cam Akers
- Landen Akers
- Dan Alexander
- Danario Alexander
- Kermit Alexander
- Maurice Alexander
- Robert Alexander
- Rich Alexis
- Jules Alfonse
- Brian Allen (born 1978)
- Brian Allen (born 1995)
- David Allen
- Davis Allen
- Duane Allen
- Roger Allen III
- Taje Allen
- Jon Alston
- Danny Amendola
- Tremayne Anchrum
- Stan Andersen
- Bruce Anderson
- C. J. Anderson
- Dwight Anderson
- Flipper Anderson
- George Andrews
- Richard Angulo
- Sam Anno
- Adam Archuleta
- AJ Arcuri
- David Arkin
- Graham Armstrong
- Ray-Ray Armstrong
- Tyji Armstrong
- Jon Arnett
- Walt Arnold
- Richard Ashe
- Darryl Ashmore
- K. C. Asiodu
- Tim Atchison
- Pervis Atkins
- Oshiomogho Atogwe
- Alex Atty
- Tutu Atwell
- David Aupiu
- Tavon Austin
- Donnie Avery
- Steve Avila
- Akeem Ayers
- Kole Ayi

== B ==
- Coy Bacon
- Steve Bagarus
- Johnny Bailey (American football)
- Robert Bailey
- Stedman Bailey
- Bill Bain
- Billy Bajema
- John Baker (born 1935)
- John Baker (born 1977)
- Terry Baker
- Tony Baker
- Tony Banks
- Justin Bannan
- Jack Banta
- Mark Barber
- Mike Barber
- Bryan Barker
- Joe Barksdale
- Lou Barle
- Lionel Barnes
- Tim Barnes
- Doug Barnett
- Dave Barr
- Alex Barron
- Mark Barron
- Paul Barry
- Ron Bartell
- Steve Bartkowski
- Connor Barwin
- Dick Bass
- Eric Bassey
- Daren Bates
- Ron Battle
- Greg Baty
- Maxie Baughan
- Alex Bayer
- Pete Beathard
- Anthony Becht
- Kurt Becker
- Odell Beckham Jr.
- Chuck Belin
- Greg Bell
- Jacob Bell
- Drew Bennett
- Jim Benton
- Mitch Berger
- Brock Berlin
- Dave Bernard
- Connie Mack Berry
- Latin Berry
- Jim Bertelsen
- George Bethune
- Jerome Bettis
- John Bettridge
- Dean Biasucci
- Jack Bighead
- Richard Bishop
- Kendall Blanton
- Mel Bleeker
- Darrius Blevins
- Dré Bly
- Austin Blythe
- Jim Boeke
- Russ Bolinger
- Kyle Boller
- Steve Bono
- Jack Boone
- Kyle Borland
- Blake Bortles
- Lew Bostick
- Gil Bouley
- Marc Boutte
- Matt Bowen
- Bill Bowers
- Bob Boyd
- Deral Boykin
- Tom Braatz
- Don Bracken
- Sam Bradford
- Charlie Bradshaw
- Ed Brady
- Jeff Brady
- Rickey Brady
- Larry Brahm
- Tom Brandstater
- Chris Brantley
- Zeke Bratkowski
- Alex Bravo
- Carl Brazell
- Gene Breen
- Chandler Brewer
- Will Brice
- O. J. Brigance
- Larry Brink
- Gene Brito
- Charley Britt
- Kenny Britt
- Dieter Brock
- Michael Brockers
- Antoine Brooks Jr.
- Ethan Brooks
- Jamal Brooks
- Larry Brooks
- Bern Brostek
- Bob Brown
- Bobby Brown III
- Doug Brown
- Earnest Brown IV
- Eddie Brown
- Fakhir Brown
- Fred Brown
- Jamon Brown
- Jason Brown
- Jonathan Brown
- Josh Brown
- Malcolm Brown
- Milford Brown
- Richard Brown
- Roger Brown
- Ron Brown
- Sammy Brown
- Tre Brown
- Willie Brown
- Isaac Bruce
- Bob Brudzinski
- Carl Brumbaugh
- Fred Bruney
- Logan Bruss
- Christian Bryant
- Cullen Bryant
- Richard Buchanan
- Phil H. Bucklew
- Frank Budka
- Rudy Bukich
- Marc Bulger
- Courtland Bullard
- Terrell Burgess
- Mike Burke
- George Burman
- Forrest Burmeister
- John Burrough
- Don Burroughs
- Keenan Burton
- Blair Bush
- Devin Bush Sr.
- Sam Busich
- Steve Busick
- Paul Butcher
- James Butler
- Jerametrius Butler
- Quincy Butler
- Rich Buzin
- Dominique Byrd
- Mac Byrd

== C ==
- Dave Cahill
- Lynn Cain
- Jeremy Calahan
- Raymond Calais
- Rich Camarillo
- Trung Canidate
- John Cappelletti
- Bob Carey
- John Carney
- Joe Carollo
- Dwaine Carpenter
- Rob Carpenter
- Ron Carpenter
- Duane Carrell
- Derek Carrier
- Adam Carriker
- Alex Carrington
- Howard Carson
- Jerome Carter
- Kevin Carter
- Pat Carter
- Roger Carter
- T. J. Carter (born 1998)
- T. J. Carter (born 1999)
- Tim Carter
- Bernie Casey
- Rick Cash
- Ken Casner
- Aveion Cason
- Jim Cason
- Jesse Castete
- Mario Celotto
- Jeff Chadwick
- Chris Chamberlain
- Ed Champagne
- Chris Chandler
- David Chapple
- Mike Charles
- Corey Chavous
- Chuck Cherundolo
- Red Chesbro
- Henry Childs
- Brandon Chillar
- Geron Christian
- Marqui Christian
- Don Chuy
- Chris Claiborne
- Al Clark
- Danny Lee Clark
- Greg Clark
- Ken Clark
- Leon Clarke
- Boyd Clay
- Hayward Clay
- Mark Clayton
- Cam Cleeland
- Kellen Clemens
- Charlie Clemons
- Rich Coady
- Dexter Coakley
- Robert Cobb
- Dustin Cohen
- Justin Cole
- Tommy Colella
- Bobby Collier
- Brett Collins
- Jerome Collins
- Jim Collins
- Kirk Collins
- Todd Collins
- Red Conkright
- Shane Conlan
- Gerry Conlee
- Matthew Conrath
- Ernie Conwell
- Jared Cook
- Marv Cook
- Brandin Cooks
- Bud Cooper
- Pharoh Cooper
- Marquise Copeland
- Austin Corbett
- Tom Corbo
- Lou Cordileone
- Olie Cordill
- Joe Corn
- Frank Corral
- Blake Corum
- Chad Cota
- Paige Cothren
- Blake Countess
- Scott Covington
- Charley Cowan
- Gerard Cowhig
- Al Cowlings
- Aaron Cox
- Tom Cox
- Ross Coyle
- Claude Crabb
- Jason Craft
- Keith Crawford
- Terry Crews
- Nolan Cromwell
- Chris Crooms
- Clifton Crosby
- Bobby Cross
- Irv Cross
- David Croudip
- Lindon Crow
- Earl Crowder
- Dwayne Crutchfield
- Jermelle Cudjo
- Quinton Culberson
- Benny Cunningham
- Justice Cunningham
- Kamren Curl
- Dan Curley
- Pat Curran
- Dan Currie
- Don Currivan
- Bill Curry
- Dominique Curry
- Kevin Curtis

== D ==
- Craig Dahl
- Harvey Dahl
- Tom Dahms
- Carroll Dale
- Willie Daniel
- Matt Daniels
- Kenneth Darby
- Dick Daugherty
- Bob David
- Anthony Davis
- Austin Davis
- Bob Davis
- Cody Davis
- Corbett Davis
- Dexter Davis
- Don Davis
- Glenn Davis
- Justin Davis
- Paschall Davis
- Roger Davis
- Stephen Davis
- Tyler Davis
- Hal Dean
- Donte Deayon
- Justin Dedich
- Bob DeFruiter
- Charles DeJurnett
- Jeff Delaney
- Bob deLauer
- Robert Delpino
- Bob DeMarco
- Jamil Demby
- Tom Dempsey
- Preston Dennard
- Mike Dennis
- Rick DiBernardo
- Eric Dickerson
- Paul Dickson
- Na'il Diggs
- Steve Dils
- Nate Dingle
- Chris Dishman
- Riley Dixon
- Kevin Dockery
- Shaun Dolac
- Don Doll
- Aaron Donald
- Andrew Donnal
- Torin Dorn
- Reggie Doss
- Kevin Dotson
- Bob Dougherty
- Dominic Douglas
- Leger Douzable
- Jerry Dowd
- Chris Draft
- Bill Drake
- Johnny Drake
- Troy Drayton
- Fred Dryer
- Bobby Duckworth
- Troy Dumas
- Jo-Lonn Dunbar
- Lance Dunbar
- Jamie Duncan
- Bill Dunstan
- Elwyn Dunstan
- Marcus Dupree
- Cobie Durant
- Cory Durden
- Jack Dwyer
- Ernest Dye
- Henry Dyer

== E ==
- Dominique Easley
- Roger Eason
- Irv Eatman
- Samson Ebukam
- Antuan Edwards
- David Edwards
- Dennis Edwards
- Herm Edwards
- Troy Edwards
- Carl Ekern
- Henry Ellard
- Jack Ellena
- Don Ellersick
- Ken Ellis
- Willie Ellison
- Dave Elmendorf
- Dutch Elston
- Jon Embree
- Bob Emerick
- Keith English
- Bobby Evans
- Donald Evans
- Ethan Evans
- Zach Evans
- Gerald Everett
- Jim Everett
- Steve Everitt
- Dick Evey
- Vilnis Ezerins

== F ==
- Terry Fair
- Nick Fairley
- Derrick Faison
- Mike Fanning
- Stan Fanning
- George Farmer
- Tom Farmer
- D'Marco Farr
- Mel Farr, Jr.
- Brett Faryniarz
- Olakunle Fatukasi
- Marshall Faulk
- Trev Faulk
- Chris Faulkner
- Jake Fawcett
- Tom Fears
- A. J. Feeley
- Daniel Fells
- Terrance Ferguson
- Vince Ferragamo
- Neil Ferris
- Brad Fichtel
- Sam Ficken
- Mark Fields
- Cedric Figaro
- Karl Finch
- Jack Finlay
- Cortland Finnegan
- Bryce Fisher
- Tony Fisher
- Travis Fisher
- Jason Fisk
- Braden Fiske
- Ryan Fitzpatrick
- John Flannery
- Bradley Fletcher
- London Fletcher
- Erik Flowers
- Leonard Floyd
- Malcolm Floyd
- Nick Foles
- Brian Folkerts
- Kai Forbath
- Emmanuel Forbes
- Poona Ford
- Josh Forrest
- Renardo Foster
- Sid Fournet
- Dante Fowler
- Morgan Fox
- Tim Fox
- Hank Fraley
- Doug France
- Jon Francis
- Tom Franckhauser
- John Franklin-Myers
- Royce Freeman
- Gus Frerotte
- Ben Friend
- Bob Fry
- Dustin Fry
- Frank Fuller
- Jordan Fuller
- Ed Fulton
- Jake Funk
- Mike Furrey

== G ==
- Roman Gabriel
- Samkon Gado
- E. J. Gaines
- Greg Gaines
- Neville Gallimore
- Tony Gallovich
- Terrance Ganaway
- Wayne Gandy
- Frank Garcia
- Jimmy Garoppolo
- Chris Garrett
- Kevin Garrett
- Cleveland Gary
- Willie Gary
- Myles Gaskin
- Percell Gaskins
- Matt Gay
- Ken Geddes
- Fred Gehrke
- Bill George
- John Gerak
- Tom Geredine
- Joe Germaine
- Jake Gervase
- John Giannoni
- Brandon Gibson
- Gary Gibson
- Joe Gibson
- Tom Gibson
- Wayne Gift
- Lewis Gilbert
- Sean Gilbert
- Owen Gill
- Jim Gillette
- Mardy Gilyard
- Matt Giordano
- Chris Givens
- La'Roi Glover
- Ed Goddard
- Herb Godfrey
- Leo Goeas
- Hank Goebel
- Jared Goff
- Adam Goldberg
- Owen Goodnight
- Joey Goodspeed
- Mike Goolsby
- Shag Goolsby
- Dick Gordon
- Lamar Gordon
- Josh Gordy
- Brandon Gorin
- Danny Gorrer
- Antonio Goss
- Bruce Gossett
- Larry Grant
- Otis Grant
- Dwayne Gratz
- Gordon Gravelle
- Jerry Gray
- John Greco
- A. J. Green
- Aaron Green
- Brandon Green
- Gary Green
- Gaston Green
- Harold Green
- Trent Green
- Kevin Greene
- Don Greenwood
- Jack Gregory
- Hank Gremminger
- Rosey Grier
- Bob Griffin
- Courtney Griffin
- John Griffin
- Howard Griffith
- Nicholas Grigsby
- DeJuan Groce
- Mike Gruttadauria
- Pete Gudauskas
- Tony Guillory
- Mike Guman
- Todd Gurley
- Al Gutknecht
- John Guzik

== H ==
- Pat Haden
- John Hadl
- Marques Hagans
- Britt Hager
- Bryce Hager
- Mario Haggan
- Az-Zahir Hakim
- Grant Haley
- Alvin Hall
- Dante Hall
- Darryl Hall
- James Hall
- Jeff Hall
- Parker Hall
- Tyler Hall
- Paul Halleck
- Jack Halliday
- Dean Halverson
- Jack Haman
- Ray Hamilton
- Ty Hamilton
- Nick Hampton
- Chuck Hanneman
- Roger Harding
- Daniel Hardy
- Jim Hardy
- Anthony Hargrove
- Cory Harkey
- Tom Harmon
- Dennis Harrah
- Al Harris
- Arlen Harris
- Derrick Harris
- Eric Harris
- Jacob Harris
- James Harris (born 1947)
- James Harris (born 1968)
- Jimmy Harris
- Joe Harris
- Kay-Jay Harris
- Marv Harris
- Dennis Harrison
- Emile Harry
- Clinton Hart
- Dale Hatcher
- Dominique Hatfield
- Art Hauser
- Rob Havenstein
- Lucas Havrisik
- Bill Hawkins
- Michael Hawthorne
- Eric Hayes
- Larry Hayes
- William Hayes
- Alvin Haymond
- Hall Haynes
- Kellen Heard
- Steve Heckard
- Norb Hecker
- Robert Hecker
- Willie Hector
- Madison Hedgecock
- Jack Heflin
- Ken Heineman
- Johnny Hekker
- Barry Helton
- Temarrick Hemingway
- Darrell Henderson
- Wymon Henderson
- Darryl Henley
- June Henley
- Bernard Henry
- Mike Henry
- Urban Henry
- Kim Herring
- Will Herring
- Mark Herrmann
- Kirk Hershey
- Jon Hesse
- Jessie Hester
- Chris Hetherington
- Craig Heyward
- Red Hickey
- Cliff Hicks
- Victor Hicks
- Tyler Higbee
- Ben Hightower
- David Hill
- Drew Hill
- Eddie Hill
- Eric Hill
- Greg Hill
- Kent Hill
- Shaun Hill
- Troy Hill
- Tye Hill
- Winston Hill
- Elroy Hirsch
- Joel Hitt
- Nate Hobgood-Chittick
- John Hock
- Zach Hocker
- KhaDarel Hodge
- Reggie Hodges
- James Hodgins
- Michael Hoecht
- Dick Hoerner
- Bob Hoffman
- Robert Holcombe
- Bob Holladay
- Marcus Holliday
- Justin Hollins
- Pete Holohan
- Mike Holovak
- Torry Holt
- Glenn Holtzman
- Tom Homco
- Roderick Hood
- Michael Hoomanawanui
- Neil Hope
- Brycen Hopkins
- Mike Horan
- Roy Hord, Jr.
- Tony Horne
- Greg Horton
- Les Horvath
- Kevin House
- John Houser
- Brian Howard
- Dana Howard
- Gene Howard
- Travin Howard
- Buddy Howell
- Frank Hubbell
- Carlos Huerta
- Dick Huffman
- Roy Huggins
- Ed Hughes
- Juju Hughes
- Kevin Hughes
- Josh Hull
- Jake Hummel
- Bobby Humphery
- Buddy Humphrey
- D. J. Humphries
- Art Hunter
- Jarquez Hunter
- Tony Hunter
- Wayne Hunter
- Thomas Hupke
- Gaylon Hyder

== I ==
- Floyd Iglehart
- Ken Iman
- Richie Incognito
- Tanner Ingle
- LeRoy Irvin
- Heath Irwin
- Steve Israel
- Ralph Isselhardt
- Corey Ivy

== J ==
- Alaric Jackson
- Alfred Jackson
- Brennan Jackson
- Brian Jackson
- DeSean Jackson
- Harold Jackson
- Jonah Jackson
- Kirby Jackson
- Monte Jackson
- Rusty Jackson
- Steven Jackson
- Tyoka Jackson
- Jack Jacobs
- Mitch Jacoby
- Jesse James
- Chuck Janerette
- Len Janiak
- Ron Jaworski
- Van Jefferson
- Billy Jenkins
- Carlos Jenkins
- Janoris Jenkins
- Robert Jenkins
- Mark Jerue
- Ron Jessie
- Gary Jeter
- Bill Jobko
- Jim Jodat
- Freeman Johns
- Bill Johnson
- Chris Johnson
- Clyde Johnson
- Damone Johnson
- Darcy Johnson
- Desjuan Johnson
- Don Johnson
- Holbert Johnson
- Isaiah Johnson
- John Johnson
- Johnnie Johnson
- Marquis Johnson
- Marvin Johnson
- Mitch Johnson
- Ray Johnson
- Sam Johnson
- Todd Johnson
- Trevor Johnson
- Trumaine Johnson
- Tyler Johnson
- Shaun Jolly
- A.J. Jones
- Barrett Jones
- Bert Jones
- Clarence Jones
- Cody Jones
- Deacon Jones
- Donnie Jones
- Ernest Jones
- Ernie Jones
- Gordon Jones
- Harvey Jones
- Jamir Jones
- Jim Jones
- Jimmie Jones
- Mike Jones (born April 15, 1969)
- Mike Jones (born August 25, 1969)
- Nate Jones
- Robert Jones
- Rod Jones
- Xavier Jones
- Jeff Jordan
- Mike Jordan
- Davin Joseph
- Sebastian Joseph-Day
- Les Josephson
- Lamarcus Joyner
- Bhawoh Jue
- Paul Justin
- Sid Justin

== Ka-Kin ==
- Mike Kabealo
- Isaiah Kacyvenski
- Jim Kalafat
- Nikola Kalinic
- Tommy Kalmanir
- John Kamana
- Carl Karilivacz
- Mike Karney
- Ted Karras
- John Karrs
- Joshua Karty
- Rick Kay
- Muadianvita Kazadi
- Tom Keane
- Joe Keeble
- Case Keenum
- Bryan Kehl
- Joe Kelly
- John Kelly
- Larry Kelm
- Jeff Kemp
- Derion Kendrick
- Lance Kendricks
- John Kenerson
- Jimmy Kennedy
- Eddie Kennison
- Jordan Kent
- Wally Kersten
- Jon Kilgore
- Elbert Kimbrough
- Todd Kinchen
- Kamren Kinchens
- Michael Kinek
- Andy King
- Justin King
