= 1944 Cleveland Rams season =

NFL team season

- Owner: Dan Reeves
- General manager: Charles Walsh
- Head coach: Aldo Donelli
- Home stadium: League Park

Results
- Record: 4–6
- Division place: 4th NFL Western
- Playoffs: Did not qualify

The 1944 Cleveland Rams season was the team's seventh year with the National Football League.

The Rams went into recess for 1943 due to the exodus of players and other team personnel to serve in World War II.

== Schedule ==
Week	Date	Opponent	Result	Record	Venue	Attendance	Recap
1	September 24	at **Card-Pitt**	**W** 30–28	1–0	Forbes Field	20,968	Recap
2	October 8	**Chicago Bears**	**W** 19–7	2–0	League Park	15,750	Recap
3	October 15	at **Detroit Lions**	**W** 20–17	3–0	Briggs Stadium	21,115	Recap
4	October 22	at **Green Bay Packers**	**L** 21–30	3–1	City Stadium	18,780	Recap
5	October 29	at **Chicago Bears**	**L** 21–28	3–2	Wrigley Field	23,644	Recap
6	November 5	at Washington Redskins	**L** 10–14	3–3	Griffith Stadium	35,540	Recap
7	November 12	**Green Bay Packers**	**L** 7–42	3–4	League Park	17,166	Recap
8	November 19	at **Card-Pitt**	**W** 33–6	4–4	Comiskey Park	14,732	Recap
9	November 26	**Detroit Lions**	**L** 14–26	4–5	League Park	7,452	Recap
10	December 10	at Philadelphia Eagles	**L** 13–26	4–6	Shibe Park	24,123	Recap
Note: Intra-division opponents are in **bold** text.

Source: Pro Football Reference

== Standings ==
NFL Western Division
	W	L	T	PCT	DIV	PF	PA	STK
Green Bay Packers	8	2	0	.800	7–1	238	141	W1
Chicago Bears	6	3	1	.667	4–3–1	258	172	W2
Detroit Lions	6	3	1	.667	4–3–1	216	151	W4
Cleveland Rams	4	6	0	.400	4–4	188	224	L2
Card-Pitt	0	10	0	.000	0–8	108	328	L10

Note: Tie games were not officially counted in the standings until 1972.

== Roster ==
1944 Cleveland Rams final roster
Backs: 22 Dave Bernard RB/S; 34 Tommy Colella RB/CB/P; 24 Jim Gillette RB/CB; 53 Roy Huggins FB/LB; 12 Harvey Jones FB/LB; 16 Mike Kabealo RB/CB; 35 John Karrs RB/S; 17 John Petchel RB/S; 26 Albie Reisz RB/CB/P; 18 Stan Skoczen FB/LB; 21 Walt West FB/LB/K; 23 Lou Zontini RB/CB/K; Ends/Receivers: 49 Jim Benton; 25 Al Gutknecht; 44 Ray Hamilton; 38 Floyd Konetsky; 30 Steve Pritko	Linemen/Linebackers: 43 Boyd Clay T/DT; 19 Tom Corbo G/DG; 42 Jake Fawcett T/DT; 36 Joe Gibson C/LB; 41 Les Lear G/DG; 11 Riley Matheson G/DG; 65 Norm Olsen T/DT; 40 Chet Pudloski T/DT; 32 Bill Rieth G/DG; 31 Charley Riffle G/DG; 39 Mike Scarry C/G/LB; rookies in italics
