= Steel Valley Conference =

Defunct high school athletic conference in Ohio U.S.

The Steel Valley Conference was an Ohio High School Athletic Association high school athletic conference that existed in two separate variations from 1949 until 2009 and from 2019 until 2025 and was made up of members from Mahoning, and Trumbull counties in Ohio.

== Members ==
| School | Location | Nickname | Color | Tenure | Notes |
|---|---|---|---|---|---|
| Cardinal Mooney | Youngstown | Cardinals | Red and gold | 2019–2025 | left to explore finding a new conference |
| Chaney | Youngstown | Cowboys | Red and gray | 2019–2025 | |
| East | Youngstown | Golden Bears | Navy and gold | 2019–2025 | |
| Ursuline | Youngstown | Fighting Irish | Green and gold | 2019–2025 | left to explore finding a new conference |

== Original SVC ==
| School | Location | Nickname | Color | Tenure | Notes |
|---|---|---|---|---|---|
| Austintown Fitch | Austintown | Falcons | Blue, red | 1949–2003 | left for Federal League |
| Boardman | Boardman | Spartan | Maroon, white | 1951–2003 | left for Federal |
| Brookfield | Brookfield | Warriors | Blue & gold | 1959–1968 | became independent |
| Cardinal Mooney | Youngstown | Cardinals | Red and gold | 1970–2009 | became independent |
| Campbell Memorial | Campbell | Red Devils | Black, red | 1949–1980 | left for Mahoning Valley Conference |
| Girard | Girard | Indians | Black, red | 1949–1971 | |
| Howland | Howland | Tigers | Orange, black | 1975–1985 | left for All-American Athletic Conference |
| Hubbard | Hubbard | Eagles | Blue, white | 1949–1980 | became independent |
| John F. Kennedy | Warren | Eagles | Blue, white | 2003–2009 | independent in football |
| Niles McKinley | Niles | Red Dragons | Red, blue | 1949–1957; 1982–1985 | left for All-American Athletic Conference |
| Struthers | Struthers | Wildcats | Red, white | 1949–1979 | left for Mahoning Valley Conference |
| Ursuline | Youngstown | Fighting Irish | Green and gold | 1970–2009 | became independent |
| Warren G. Harding | Warren | Panthers/Raiders | Red, black (until 1990) Black, gold (1990–present) | 1982–1985; 1991–2009 | left for All-American Athletic Conference, left for All-American in 2009. School's mascot and colors changed to the Raiders logo in 1990. |
| Western Reserve | Warren | Raiders | Black, gold | 1980–1985 | left for All-American Athletic Conference |

== History ==
The Steel Valley Conference was established in 1949, bringing together several prominent high schools from Trumbull and Mahoning counties during a period when industrial communities in the region were thriving. Charter members included schools such as Niles McKinley, Girard, Hubbard, Austintown Fitch, Struthers, and Campbell Memorial, with Boardman joining shortly thereafter in 1951.

Throughout the 1950s and 1960s, the league developed a reputation for strong competition and regional rivalries. After Niles temporarily departed in 1957, Brookfield joined in 1959, creating what is often remembered as the “classic” lineup of the conference, which remained largely intact through the late 1960s.

Membership fluctuated over the following decades as school consolidations, closures, and shifting competitive needs reshaped the league. One notable era came in the early 1980s, when the conference included a balanced alignment of Trumbull County schools (such as Warren G. Harding, Howland, Niles, and Warren Western Reserve) alongside Mahoning County programs like Boardman, Fitch, Ursuline, and Cardinal Mooney.

This alignment dissolved in 1986 when several Trumbull County schools departed to form the All-American Athletic Conference. Although some members later returned, the SVC increasingly experienced instability as schools sought larger or more geographically aligned conferences.

By the early 2000s, key departures, most notably Austintown Fitch and Boardman to the Federal League signaled the league's decline. Additional changes, including school closures in Youngstown and shifting affiliations, further reduced membership. The original Steel Valley Conference ultimately ceased operations in 2009, ending a 60-year run as one of northeastern Ohio's most recognizable high school leagues.

A decade after its dissolution, the Steel Valley Conference was revived in 2019 with a new, more compact structure centered entirely on Youngstown City Schools and parochial programs. The reformed league consisted of Youngstown East, Youngstown Chaney, Cardinal Mooney, and Ursuline, restoring a city-based conference model. Unlike the original version, which spanned multiple counties and included suburban districts, the second incarnation emphasized local rivalries within Youngstown. The conference operated primarily as a scheduling alliance to ensure consistent competition among similarly sized urban programs.

However, the revived SVC proved short-lived. Ongoing structural challenges including school consolidations within the Youngstown City School District and realignment decisions by parochial members limited its long-term sustainability. By the conclusion of the 2024–25 school year, the conference disbanded once again, as Cardinal Mooney and Ursuline were originally set to join the Ohio Catholic Athletic Conference, however before the league's scheduled conception in 2026, both schools withdrew from the league. and Chaney and East are undergoing consolidation at the conclusion of the 2025–26 school year.
