= Youngstown City Series =

The Youngstown City Series was an OHSAA athletic conference that began play in 1925 and lasted until the end of the 2006–07 school year. Its members were located in the city of Youngstown, Ohio (including all Youngstown City School District high schools), although membership was eventually extended to Timken High School in Canton, Ohio. Some schools closed during the league's tenure, while the rest left before the closings or at the league's demise.

== Members ==
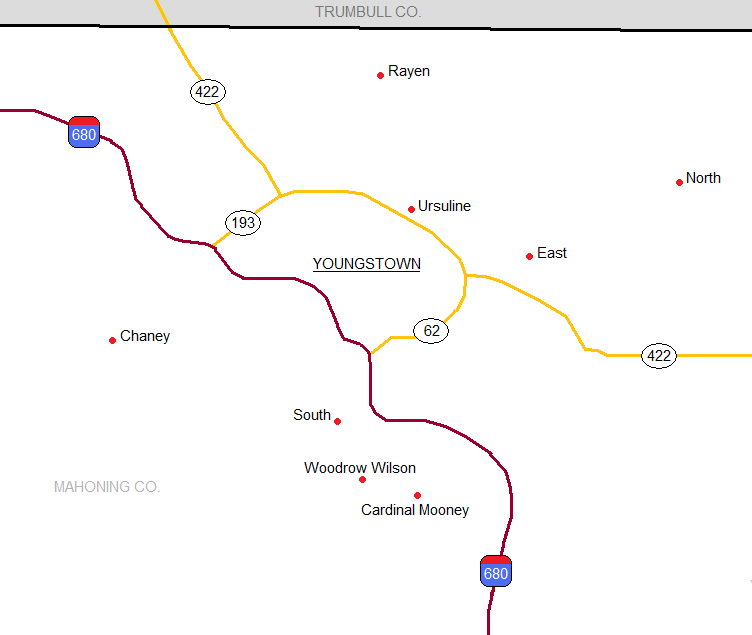
The traditional Youngstown members of the YCS. Canton Timken is not shown.

School	Nickname	Colors	Address	Type	Membership Years
Cardinal Mooney	Cardinals	Red, Gold	2545 Erie St. Youngstown, OH 44507	Private, Catholic, Co-Ed	1958–1970 (left for SVC)
Chaney	Cowboys	Red, Gray	731 S. Hazelwood Ave. Youngstown, OH 44509	Public	1960–2003 (left for SVC)
East	Golden Bears	Blue, Gold	474 Bennington Ave. Youngstown, OH 44506	Public	1925–1998 (closed)
North	Bulldogs	Red, Black	Liberty Rd. Youngstown, OH 44505	Public	1925–1980 (closed)
Rayen	Tigers	Orange, Black	250 Benita Ave. Youngstown, OH 44504	Public	1925–2003 (left for SVC)
South	Warriors	Red, Blue	1833 Market St. Youngstown, OH 44507	Public	1925–1993 (closed)
Woodrow Wilson	Presidents (1936–1958); Redmen (1958–2003)	Red, White	2725 Gibson St. Youngstown, OH 44502	Public	1936–2003 (left for SVC)
Ursuline	Fighting Irish	Green, Gold	750 Wick Ave. Youngstown, OH 44505	Private, Catholic, Co-Ed	1958–1970 (left for SVC)
Timken	Trojans	Blue, Gold	521 Tuscarawas St. W. Canton, OH 44702	Public	1999–2003 (left for PAC-8)

- Note: During this time, East High School was known as the "Golden Bears" and wore the colors of blue and gold. The school closed as a high school in 1998, and when it reopened in 2007, the students chose to be nicknamed the "Panthers" and school colors of light blue and silver. In 2017, East HS returned to using the Golden Bears nickname and the former school colors of blue and gold.

The legacy of all six Youngstown public high schools was honored with pennants for each school (Chaney, East, North, Rayen, South, & Wilson) to fly at the newly-renovated Rayen Stadium, which had its field named for Rayen alum Jack Antonucci in 2012. The stadium was initially built in 1924 and has served as the playing surface for JV, Freshmen, and Middle School football games since the last regular season varsity home game for a Youngstown City School in 1993.

In 2022, Jack Antonucci Field at Rayen Stadium had Field Turf installed, which included a midfield "Y" that honored the six Youngstown public high schools and the city name YOUNGSTOWN laid down in black lettering on a red background in the endzones.

== League champions ==
Year	Football Champions
1927	South
1928	South, Rayen
1929	Chaney
1930	Chaney
1931	South
1932	Chaney, Rayen, South
1933	Rayen
1934	Rayen
1935	East, Rayen, South
1936	Chaney
1937	Chaney
1938	Chaney
1939	Rayen
1940	East
1941	South
1942	Wilson
1943	East
1944	Chaney, East, South
1945	Ursuline
1946	Wilson

Year	Football Champions
1947	Chaney, Ursuline
1948	Chaney, East
1949	East
1950	East
1951	East, South, Wilson
1952	East, Ursuline
1953	South
1954	Rayen
1955	East
1956	Ursuline
1957	South
1958	East
1959	East, South, Ursuline
1960	Rayen
1961	Mooney
1962	Mooney
1963	Ursuline
1964	Ursuline
1965	Chaney
1966	Chaney, Mooney

Year	Football Champions
1967	Mooney
1968	Chaney
1969	Chaney
1970	North
1971	North
1972	Chaney
1973	Chaney, East, North
1974	Chaney
1975	Chaney
1976	Chaney
1977	Chaney, South
1978	Chaney
1979	South
1980	Chaney
1981	South
1982	East, Rayen
1983	South
1984	South
1985	Rayen
1986	East

Year	Football Champions
1987	South
1988	Rayen
1989	Rayen
1990	Chaney
1991	Chaney
1992	Chaney
1993	Chaney
1994	Chaney
1995	Chaney
1996	Chaney
1997	East
1998	Chaney
1999	Chaney
2000	Chaney
2001	Chaney
2002	Chaney
2003	Chaney
2004	Chaney
2005	Rayen
2006	Rayen
