= 2006 St. Louis Rams season =

NFL team season

- Owner: Georgia Frontiere
- Head coach: Scott Linehan
- Home stadium: Edward Jones Dome

Results
- Record: 8–8
- Division place: 2nd NFC West
- Playoffs: Did not qualify
- Pro Bowlers: QB Marc Bulger; RB Steven Jackson; WR Torry Holt

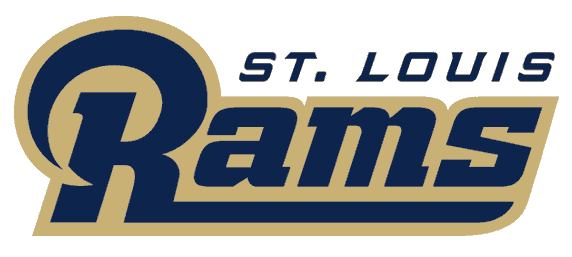
The script logo for the St. Louis Rams for the 2006 season

The 2006 season was the St. Louis Rams' 69th in the National Football League (NFL) and their 12th in St. Louis. The season began with the Rams trying to improve on their 6–10 record from 2005 under new head coach Scott Linehan. This was the Rams last non-losing season in St. Louis as the franchise would go on a ten-season losing record streak until 2017 in Los Angeles.

== Offseason ==
Scott Linehan was named head coach of the St. Louis Rams on January 19, 2006. He previously served as the offensive coordinator for the Miami Dolphins. On January 24, Jim Haslett, the former head coach of the New Orleans Saints, signed a three-year deal to become the Rams new defensive coordinator. On March 17, 2006, the Rams signed former Miami Dolphins QB Gus Frerotte to a three-year deal.

During the free agency period, the Rams signed DT La'Roi Glover, LB Will Witherspoon and S Corey Chavous.

In the 2006 NFL draft, the Rams used their first pick on Clemson CB Tye Hill. They used the next pick on Colorado TE Joe Klopfenstein. The remaining picks were LSU DT Claude Wroten, USC TE Dominique Byrd, Stanford LB Jon Alston, Indiana DE Victor Adeyanju, Virginia WR Marques Hagans, Northwestern LB Tim McGarigle, Minnesota Guard Mark Setterstrom, and Missouri Guard Tony Palmer.

On Friday, September 1, 2006, the Rams signed former Carolina Panthers RB Stephen Davis a one-year contract.

The Rams also signed defensive tackle Jason Fisk to pair with La'Roi Glover.

== Staff ==
St. Louis Rams 2006 staff
Head coaches: Head coach – Scott Linehan; Assistant head coach/linebackers – Rick Venturi; Offensive coaches: Offensive coordinator – Greg Olson; Quarterbacks – Doug Nussmeier; Running backs – Wayne Moses; Wide receivers – Henry Ellard; Tight ends – Judd Garrett; Offensive line – Paul T Boudreau; Assistant offensive line – Jim Chaney; Offensive assistant/special assistant – Jeff Horton; Offensive quality control/running backs – Randy Hanson	Defensive coaches: Defensive coordinator – Jim Haslett; Defensive line – Brian Baker; Secondary – Willy Robinson; Assistant secondary/linebackers – Ron Milus; Defensive quality control – Joe Baker; Special teams coaches: Special teams – Bob Ligashesky; Assistant special teams/defensive assistant – Todd Downing; Strength and conditioning: Head strength and conditioning – Dana LeDuc; Assistant strength and conditioning – Brad Roll

== Roster ==
2006 St. Louis Rams roster
Quarterbacks (QB): 10 Marc Bulger; 12 Ryan Fitzpatrick; 11 Gus Frerotte; Running backs (RB): 32 Rich Alexis; 48 Stephen Davis; 33 Kay-Jay Harris KR; 44 Madison Hedgecock FB; 39 Steven Jackson; 31 Paul Smith FB; Wide receivers (WR): 80 Isaac Bruce; 83 Kevin Curtis KR/PR; 81 Torry Holt; 89 Dane Looker; 84 Shaun McDonald PR; 88 Willie Ponder KR; Tight ends (TE): 86 Dominique Byrd; 82 Joe Klopfenstein; 87 Aaron Walker	Offensive linemen (OL): 70 Alex Barron T; 72 Adam Goldberg G/T; 68 Richie Incognito C/G; 64 Jeremy Parquet T; 65 Brett Romberg C; 66 Mark Setterstrom G; 79 Todd Steussie G/T; 62 Adam Timmerman G; 63 Larry Turner C; Defensive linemen (DL): 94 Victor Adeyanju DE; 96 Jason Fisk DT; 97 La'Roi Glover DT; 93 Brandon Green DE; 73 Jimmy Kennedy DT; 91 Leonard Little DE; 92 Eric Moore DE; 99 Claude Wroten DT	Linebackers (LB): 57 Jon Alston OLB; 55 Jamal Brooks OLB; 54 Brandon Chillar OLB; 52 Dexter Coakley OLB; 58 Isaiah Kacyvenski MLB; 56 Raonall Smith OLB; 51 Will Witherspoon MLB; Defensive backs (DB): 21 Oshiomogho Atogwe FS; 24 Ron Bartell CB; 34 Fakhir Brown CB; 23 Jerametrius Butler CB; 27 Dwaine Carpenter FS; 42 Jerome Carter SS; 25 Corey Chavous SS; 26 Tye Hill CB; Special teams (ST): 45 Chris Massey LS; 1 Matt Turk P; 14 Jeff Wilkins K	Practice squad: 49 Mark Anelli TE; 98 Mike Brown DE; 15 Marques Hagans WR; 20 Josh Lay CB; 59 Tim McGarigle LB; 77 Drew Strojny T; 17 Dominique Thompson WR; 35 John David Washington RB; Reserve: 28 Marshall Faulk RB (PUP); 30 Tony Fisher RB/KR (IR); 22 Travis Fisher CB (IR); 67 Andy McCollum C (IR); 76 Orlando Pace T (IR); 75 Claude Terrell G (IR); 50 Pisa Tinoisamoa LB (IR); Rookies in italics 53 active, 7 reserve, 8 practice squad

== Schedule ==
In the 2006 regular season, the Rams’ non-divisional, conference opponents were primarily from the NFC North, although they also played the Washington Redskins from the NFC East, and the Carolina Panthers from the NFC South. Their non-conference opponents were from the AFC West.

Week	Date	Opponent	Result	Record	Venue	Attendance
1	September 10	Denver Broncos	**W** 18–10	1–0	Edward Jones Dome	65,577
2	September 17	at **San Francisco 49ers**	**L** 13–20	1–1	Monster Park	67,791
3	September 24	at **Arizona Cardinals**	**W** 16–14	2–1	University of Phoenix Stadium	63,278
4	October 1	Detroit Lions	**W** 41–34	3–1	Edward Jones Dome	65,563
5	October 8	at Green Bay Packers	**W** 23–20	4–1	Lambeau Field	70,804
6	October 15	**Seattle Seahawks**	**L** 28–30	4–2	Edward Jones Dome	65,592
7	Bye					
8	October 29	at San Diego Chargers	**L** 24–38	4–3	Qualcomm Stadium	66,598
9	November 5	Kansas City Chiefs	**L** 17–31	4–4	Edward Jones Dome	66,191
10	November 12	at **Seattle Seahawks**	**L** 22–24	4–5	Qwest Field	68,175
11	November 19	at Carolina Panthers	**L** 0–15	4–6	Bank of America Stadium	73,348
12	November 26	**San Francisco 49ers**	**W** 20–17	5–6	Edward Jones Dome	65,517
13	December 3	**Arizona Cardinals**	**L** 20–34	5–7	Edward Jones Dome	65,612
14	December 11	Chicago Bears	**L** 27–42	5–8	Edward Jones Dome	66,234
15	December 17	at Oakland Raiders	**W** 20–0	6–8	McAfee Coliseum	50,164
16	December 24	Washington Redskins	**W** 37–31 (OT)	7–8	Edward Jones Dome	62,324
17	December 31	at Minnesota Vikings	**W** 41–21	8–8	Hubert H. Humphrey Metrodome	63,557

Note: Intra-division opponents are in bold text.

== Standings ==
NFC West
	W	L	T	PCT	DIV	CONF	PF	PA	STK
^{(4)} Seattle Seahawks	9	7	0	.563	3–3	7–5	335	341	W1
St. Louis Rams	8	8	0	.500	2–4	6–6	367	381	W3
San Francisco 49ers	7	9	0	.438	3–3	5–7	298	412	W1
Arizona Cardinals	5	11	0	.313	4–2	5–7	314	389	L1

== Regular season ==
=== Week 1: vs. Denver Broncos ===
	1	2	3	4	Total
Broncos	0	7	0	3	10
Rams	3	9	3	3	18

at Edward Jones Dome, St. Louis, Missouri

The Rams opened the regular season at home against the Denver Broncos on September 10 with a Rams' 18–10 win. Jeff Wilkins scored all of the Rams' points by kicking six field goals, a franchise record for a single game (from 51, 48, 26, 38, 29 and 24 yards), and became the first Ram player to score 1000 points in a career. Wilkins also tied a franchise record of seven field goal attempts in one game which was first accomplished by Bob Waterfield on December 9, 1951. The Rams were unable to score a touchdown all game and went 0 for 5 in the red zone.

The defense allowed just one touchdown and forced five turnovers. Three of these turnovers were interceptions, from a team that only allowed seven interceptions all of last season. First round draft pick Tye Hill intercepted a pass by Jake Plummer with 12:02 in the second quarter. It was his first in his NFL career. The defense also sacked Jake Plummer four times in the game, with Leonard Little accounting for two of them.

Isaac Bruce passed Henry Ellard and Shannon Sharpe for 11th most receptions in an NFL career with his five receptions for 64 yards.

Center Andy McCollum injured his left knee with 7:39 left in the second quarter and was out for the rest of the game. On September 11, 2006 it was announced that McCollum will miss the entire season and will undergo knee surgery. With the win, the Rams began their season 1–0.

=== Week 2: at San Francisco 49ers ===
	1	2	3	4	Total
Rams	0	10	0	3	13
49ers	3	0	14	3	20

at Monster Park, San Francisco, California

The Rams visited division rival San Francisco 49ers on September 17 for their home opener. The 49ers increased their winning streak against the Rams to three, beating the Rams 20–13.

With 11:10 left in the first quarter, Alex Smith completed a 56-yard pass to Arnaz Battle, setting up a 32-yard field goal by Joe Nedney. At the beginning of the second quarter, Corey Chavous recovered a Frank Gore fumble at the Rams 3-yard line. The Rams moved the ball sixty yards down the field setting up a 49-yard Jeff Wilkins field goal. The Rams scored their first touchdown of the season with a 3-yard pass from Marc Bulger to Torry Holt with 2:21 left in the half, giving the Rams a 10–3 lead going into the half.

With 14:12 left in the third quarter, the 49ers tied the game at ten with a Gore 32-yard touchdown run. The 49ers took the lead at 10:54 in the third quarter with a 72-yard pass from Smith to Antonio Bryant. Each team had a field goal in the fourth quarter. Wilkins hit a 40-yard field goal with 11:06 in the fourth, and Nedney had a 20-yard field goal with 5:23 in the fourth.

Bulger was sacked six times in the game and completed 19 of 34 attempts for 147 yards. Steven Jackson had 103 yards on the ground on 22 carries, along with 2 receptions for 21 yards. Will Witherspoon also had a good game making 13 tackles and forcing one fumble. The Rams had 118 total yards during the second half.

Left tackle Orlando Pace left the game at the half with a concussion. He was taken to a hospital in the bay area where a CAT scan turned up negative. Linebacker Pisa Tinoisamoa dislocated his elbow in the third quarter, and missed the rest of the game. With the loss, the Rams fell to 1–1.

=== Week 3: at Arizona Cardinals ===
	1	2	3	4	Total
Rams	0	13	3	0	16
Cardinals	7	0	0	7	14

at University of Phoenix Stadium, Glendale, Arizona

The Rams traveled to Glendale, Arizona for their first game in the new Cardinals Stadium.

With 11:28 left in the first quarter of play, Matt Turk kicked a 31-yard punt giving the Cardinals the ball on the Saint Louis 45. Nine plays later, Kurt Warner threw a 12-yard touchdown pass to Larry Fitzgerald. This gave the Cardinals a 7–0 lead with 7:04 left in the quarter.

With 11:28 left in the second quarter, Jeff Wilkins hit a 26-yard field goal to put the Rams on the board 7–3. On the Cardinals next drive, Warner was intercepted by O.J. Atogwe giving the Rams the ball on their own 6-yard line. Marc Bulger hit Torry Holt for gains of 42, 26 and 9 yards during the drive, with the final catch ending in a touchdown. It was the second touchdown for Holt and the Rams for the 2006 season. The very first play of the next Cardinals drive, Warner was intercepted again by Fakhir Brown. The Rams drove the ball down the field for 16 yards setting up a Wilkins 47-yard field goal to end the half, giving the Rams a 13–7 lead. Wilkins kicked another field goal with 8:08 left in the third quarter increasing the Rams lead 16–7.

With 4:13 left in the fourth quarter, the Cardinals ended a 16-play, 87-yard drive with a 9-yard Edgerrin James run for a touchdown cutting the Rams lead 16–14. With 1:58 left to play, Bulger fumbled the ball at the Saint Louis 30. It was recovered by Arizona's Antonio Smith. Yet, on the third play of the drive, Warner fumbled the snap and the Rams' Will Witherspoon recovered the ball. The Rams ran the clock out and won the game 16–14.

Rookie Victor Adeyanju got his first start in the game, replacing Anthony Hargrove who did not show up for meetings and practices. With the win, the Rams improved to 2–1.

=== Week 4: vs. Detroit Lions ===
	1	2	3	4	Total
Lions	3	14	10	7	34
Rams	13	3	14	11	41

at Edward Jones Dome, St. Louis, Missouri

Hoping to build on their road win over the Cardinals, the Rams returned home for a match-up with the Detroit Lions and their offensive coordinator, former Rams head coach Mike Martz. In the first quarter, the Rams kicker Jeff Wilkins kicked a 42-yard and a 19-yard field goal to begin the game. The Lions kicker Jason Hanson kicked a 29-yard field goal. St. Louis distanced themselves, as QB Marc Bulger completed a 16-yard TD pass to rookie TE Joe Klopfenstein. In the second quarter, Lions QB Jon Kitna and WR Mike Furrey hooked up with each other on two touchdown passes (a 1-yarder and a 10-yarder), but the Rams retook the lead with Wilkins completing a 46-yard field goal. In the third quarter, St. Louis gained even more points, as Bulger connected with WR Torry Holt on a 16-yard TD strike. Detroit got a 20-yard field goal from Hanson and RB Kevin Jones ran 35 yards for a touchdown, but the Rams had their RB, Steven Jackson, get a 1-yard TD run to add to their lead. In the fourth quarter, Jones ran for a 7-yard TD strike. The Rams closed out the game with a win, as Wilkins completed a 47-yard field goal and Bulger completed a 5-yard TD pass to WR Isaac Bruce. With the win, the Rams improved to 3–1.

=== Week 5: at Green Bay Packers ===
	1	2	3	4	Total
Rams	7	7	3	6	23
Packers	7	6	0	7	20

at Lambeau Field, Green Bay, Wisconsin

First-year coaches Scott Linehan and Mike McCarthy faced off against each other in Lambeau Field on October 8, 2006.

On the Packers’ first possession of the game, Vernand Morency fumbled the ball and it was recovered by rookie Victor Adeyanju. This gave the Rams the ball at the Packers' 37. Six plays later, Marc Bulger passed the ball to Torry Holt for a 6-yard touchdown pass. Jeff Wilkins hit the extra point giving the Rams the lead with 9:49 left in the first quarter. The Packers answered with a 15-play 80-yard touchdown drive that ended in a Noah Herron 1-yard touchdown run. Dave Rayner made the extra point tying the game at seven.

One the first possession of the second quarter, Dave Rayner connected on a 27-yard field goal, giving the Packers a 10–7 lead with 13:12 left in the quarter. Marc Bulger completed a 3-yard pass to Kevin Curtis for a touchdown with 3:33 left in the quarter. Jeff Wilkins made the extra point giving the Rams a 14–10 lead. The Packers connected on a 32-yard field goal with 0:03 left in the quarter cutting the lead down to one.

The only points in the third quarter were on a 31-yard field goal by Wilkins, increasing the Rams lead to 17–13.

Jeff Wilkins made two more field goals in the fourth quarter, one with 14:57 remaining in the quarter and another with 9:27 remaining, which gave the Rams a 23–13 lead. Brett Favre completed a 46-yard touchdown pass to Greg Jennings with 6:42 left in the game. The extra point was good. The Packers attempted a late comeback, but Favre fumbled the ball on the Rams' 13-yard line. It was recovered by Jerametrius Butler. The Rams took a knee ending the game with the Rams winning, 23–20, and improving to 4–1.

Steven Jackson ended the game with 98 yards on the ground on 23 carries. Bulger completed 18 passes on 28 attempts for 220 yards and two touchdowns.

=== Week 6: vs. Seattle Seahawks ===
	1	2	3	4	Total
Seahawks	7	0	7	16	30
Rams	7	14	0	7	28

at Edward Jones Dome, St. Louis, Missouri

Hoping to keep their three-game winning streak going, the Rams returned home for an NFC West fight with the Seattle Seahawks. The Rams struck first, as QB Marc Bulger completed a 9-yard TD pass to WR Torry Holt. Yet, the Seahawks responded with QB Matt Hasselbeck completing a 14-yard TD pass to WR Deion Branch. In the second quarter, St. Louis began pulling away, as RB Steven Jackson ran 2 yards for a touchdown and the duo of Bulger and Holt hooked up again with a 10-yard TD pass. In the third quarter, the Seahawks started to creep back as Hasselbeck completed a 42-yard TD pass to WR Darrell Jackson. In the fourth quarter, Seattle managed to take the lead with kicker Josh Brown nailing a 49-yard field goal, Hasselbeck throwing a 19-yard TD pass to Branch, and Brown kicking another 49-yard field goal. The Rams responded with Bulger and Holt completing a 67-yard TD pass. The Seahawks won as Brown kicked a 54-yard field goal as time ran out, giving Seattle a three-game winning streak against St. Louis. This game was marred by controversy as the 10-second run-off rule did not apply on the last play of the game, giving Josh Brown the chance to win the game. With the loss, the Rams headed into their bye week 4–2.

=== Week 8: at San Diego Chargers ===
	1	2	3	4	Total
Rams	0	7	3	14	24
Chargers	14	0	10	14	38

at Qualcomm Stadium, San Diego, California

Coming off of their bye week, the Rams flew to Qualcomm Stadium for their Week 8 match-up with the San Diego Chargers. From the get-go, St. Louis trailed as RB LaDainian Tomlinson got a 2-yard TD run and a 38-yard TD run in the first quarter. In the second quarter, the Rams started to retaliate as RB Steven Jackson got a 3-yard TD run for the only score of the period. In the third quarter, things started to get ugly for St. Louis as Chargers free safety Marlon McCree returned a fumble 79 yards for a touchdown. The Rams responded with kicker Jeff Wilkins nailing a 34-yard field goal, yet Chargers kicker Nate Kaeding made a 31-yard field goal. In the fourth quarter, it was back and forth with touchdowns. San Diego RB Michael Turner got a 14-yard TD run, while Rams QB Marc Bulger completed a 7-yard TD pass to WR Shaun McDonald. Afterwards, Chargers QB Philip Rivers completed a 25-yard TD pass to Tomlinson, while Bulger completed a 6-yard TD pass to WR Kevin Curtis. However, San Diego got the win, as St. Louis fell to 4–3.

=== Week 9: vs. Kansas City Chiefs ===
	1	2	3	4	Total
Chiefs	7	17	0	7	31
Rams	0	10	7	0	17

at Edward Jones Dome, St. Louis, Missouri

Hoping to rebound from the road loss to the Chargers, the Rams went home for Week 9, as they fought the Kansas City Chiefs in a “Show Me State Showdown”. The Chiefs struck first as RB Larry Johnson got a 1-yard TD run for the only score of the period. In the second quarter, things got worse for the Rams as QB Damon Huard completed a 3-yard TD pass to TE Tony Gonzalez, while kicker Lawrence Tynes nailed a 42-yard field goal. St. Louis got on the board with RB Steven Jackson getting a 2-yard TD run, yet Huard and Gonzalez hooked up with each other again on a 25-yard TD strike. Rams kicker Jeff Wilkins made a 41-yard field goal to end the half. In the third quarter, QB Marc Bulger completed a 2-yard TD pass to WR Kevin Curtis for the only score of the period, yet the only score of the fourth quarter came from Huard completing an 11-yard TD pass to TE Kris Wilson. With the loss, the Rams fell to 4–4.

=== Week 10: at Seattle Seahawks ===
	1	2	3	4	Total
Rams	10	3	3	6	22
Seahawks	7	7	0	10	24

at Qwest Field, Seattle

Trying to end their three-game skid, the Rams flew to Qwest Field for an NFC West rematch with the Seattle Seahawks. In the first quarter, the Rams struck first with rookie DE Victor Adeyanju returning a fumble 89 yards for a touchdown. Afterwards, the Seahawks responded with QB Seneca Wallace completing a 3-yard TD pass to WR Darrell Jackson. Then, St. Louis had kicker Jeff Wilkins nail a 40-yard field goal. In the second quarter, Seattle took the lead with Wallace completing a 15-yard TD pass to TE Jerramy Stevens. The Rams responded with Wilkins's 42-yard field goal. In the third quarter, Wilkins gave St. Louis a 35-yard field goal for the only score of the period and the lead. In the fourth quarter, the Seahawks responded with WR Nate Burleson returning a punt 90 yards for a touchdown. The Rams retook the lead with RB Steven Jackson’s 14-yard TD run, yet it was followed up with a failed two-point conversion. However, just like earlier in the year, Seahawks kicker Josh Brown came out with the win, as he kicked a 38-yard field goal. With the loss, the Rams fell to 4–5.

=== Week 11: at Carolina Panthers ===
	1	2	3	4	Total
Rams	0	0	0	0	0
Panthers	0	10	3	2	15

at Bank of America Stadium, Charlotte, North Carolina

Trying to end a four-game skid, the Rams flew to Bank of America Stadium for a Week 11 fight with the Carolina Panthers. After a scoreless first quarter, the Panthers took control for the rest of the game. In the second quarter, Carolina kicker John Kasay made a 40-yard field goal, while QB Jake Delhomme completed a 62-yard TD pass to WR Steve Smith. In the third quarter, Kasay improved the Panthers’ lead with a 34-yard field goal for the only score of the period. In the fourth quarter, Carolina wrapped up the game with DE Mike Rucker sacking QB Marc Bulger in the Rams end zone for a safety. With St. Louis’ fifth-straight loss, the Rams fell to 4–6.

=== Week 12: vs. San Francisco 49ers ===
	1	2	3	4	Total
49ers	0	7	7	3	17
Rams	0	13	0	7	20

at Edward Jones Dome, St. Louis, Missouri

Trying to end a five-game skid, the Rams went home for an NFC West rematch with their historic rival, the San Francisco 49ers. After a scoreless first quarter, the Rams drew first blood in the second quarter with kicker Jeff Wilkins' 24-yard field goal and RB Steven Jackson’s 36-yard TD run. he 49ers responded with RB Frank Gore's 12-yard TD run, yet St. Louis got Wilkins to kick a 51-yard field goal as time ran out on the half. In the third quarter, the 49ers took the lead with QB Alex Smith completing a 1-yard TD pass to TE Eric Johnson for the only score of the period. In the fourth quarter, the 49ers increased its lead with kicker Joe Nedney nailing a 24-yard field goal. The Rams got the win with QB Marc Bulger completing a 5-yard TD pass to WR Kevin Curtis. Not only did St. Louis improve its record to 5–6, but they also snapped a five-game losing streak.

=== Week 13: vs. Arizona Cardinals ===
	1	2	3	4	Total
Cardinals	7	10	7	10	34
Rams	3	0	7	10	20

at Edward Jones Dome, St. Louis, Missouri

Coming off their victory over the 49ers, the Rams stayed at home for an NFC West rematch with the Arizona Cardinals. In the first quarter, the Rams trailed early as Cardinals RB Marcel Shipp got a 1-yard TD run. St. Louis responded with kicker Jeff Wilkins. In the second quarter, the Rams continued to struggle as QB Matt Leinart completed an 11-yard TD pass to WR Larry Fitzgerald, while kicker Neil Rackers nailed a 23-yard field goal. In the third quarter, St. Louis tried to retaliate with QB Marc Bulger completing a 15-yard TD pass to WR Torry Holt, yet the Cards responded with Shipp's 6-yard TD run. In the fourth quarter, the Rams had Wilkins kick a 37-yard field goal. However, the Big Red pulled away with Shipp's 9-yard TD run and Rackers' 20-yard TD run. Even though St. Louis made another TD, with Bulger completing a 1-yard pass to WR Isaac Bruce, Arizona held on to win. With the loss, the Rams fell to 5–7.

=== Week 14: vs. Chicago Bears ===
	1	2	3	4	Total
Bears	0	14	14	14	42
Rams	0	13	0	14	27

at Russell Athletic Field, St. Louis, Missouri

Coming off their loss to the Cardinals, the Rams stayed at home for a Monday Night fight with the current NFC North champion Chicago Bears. After a scoreless first quarter, the Rams struck first with QB Marc Bulger completing a 1-yard TD pass to WR Torry Holt, yet the PAT attempt had a botched snap, making it no good. However, immediately following St. Louis's first score, the Bears took the lead with DB Devin Hester returning a kickoff 94 yards for a touchdown. Fortunately, the Rams responded with RB Steven Jackson's 2-yard TD run, yet Chicago responded with QB Rex Grossman's 34-yard TD pass to WR Bernard Berrian. St. Louis tried to get a 48-yard field goal in before halftime, yet it just went wide right. In the third quarter, the Rams' recent struggles continued with RB Thomas Jones's 30-yard TD run, while Grossman completed a 14-yard TD pass to WR Muhsin Muhammad. In the fourth quarter, the Bears dominance continued with RB Adrian Peterson's 1-yard TD run. St. Louis tried to come back with Bulger completing a 6-yard TD pass to Holt, yet Hester immediately followed that up with a 96-yard kickoff return for a touchdown, which gave him the single-season record for the most returns for a touchdown with six. The only thing remaining within St. Louis was Jackson's 2-yard TD run. With their second-straight loss, the Rams fell to 5–8.

=== Week 15: at Oakland Raiders ===
	1	2	3	4	Total
Rams	0	6	7	7	20
Raiders	0	0	0	0	0

at McAfee Coliseum, Oakland, California

The Rams flew to McAfee Coliseum to take on the Oakland Raiders, who, just like the Rams, used to play in the city of Los Angeles.

After a scoreless first quarter, St. Louis struck first in the second quarter with kicker Jeff Wilkins nailing a 24-yard and a 34-yard field goal. In the third quarter, the Rams increased their lead with RB Steven Jackson's 4-yard TD run. In the fourth quarter, St. Louis wrapped up the win with Jackson's 19-yard TD run. With the win, the Rams improved their record to 6–8. It was the first Rams shutout win since 2003.

=== Week 16: vs. Washington Redskins ===
	1	2	3	4	OT	Total
Redskins	7	14	7	3	0	31
Rams	0	14	14	3	6	37

at Edward Jones Dome, St. Louis, Missouri

Coming off their dominating road win over the Raiders, the Rams played their last home game of the year as they took on the Washington Redskins. In the first quarter, the Redskins struck first with RB T. J. Duckett getting a 5-yard TD run for the only score of the period. In the second quarter, St. Louis took the lead with QB Marc Bulger completing a 10-yard TD pass to WR Isaac Bruce and a 27-yard TD pass to rookie TE Dominique Byrd. However, Washington responded with RB Ladell Betts getting a 6-yard TD run and QB Jason Campbell completing a 9-yard TD pass to TE Chris Cooley. In the third quarter, the Redskins increased their lead with Betts getting a 7-yard TD run. The Rams responded with Bulger completing a 64-yard TD pass to RB Stephen Jackson and a 10-yard TD pass to RB Stephen Davis. In the fourth quarter, St. Louis took the lead with kicker Jeff Wilkins getting a 21-yard field goal, yet Washington managed to tie the game with kicker Shaun Suisham getting a 52-yard field goal. In overtime, the Rams won with Jackson getting a 21-yard TD run. With the win, St. Louis improved to 7–8.

However, because the New York Giants won a Week 17 match-up against the Redskins, it ended any chance for the Rams to get into the playoffs.

=== Week 17: at Minnesota Vikings ===
	1	2	3	4	Total
Rams	10	14	10	7	41
Vikings	7	0	0	14	21

at Hubert H. Humphrey Metrodome, Minneapolis, Minnesota

The Rams flew to the Hubert H. Humphrey Metrodome to take on the Minnesota Vikings. In the first quarter, St. Louis got off to a fast start as free safety Ronald Bartell returned an interception 38 yards for a touchdown. Afterwards, kicker Jeff Wilkins made a 42-yard field goal. After that, the Vikings responded with QB Tarvaris Jackson getting a 1-yard TD run. In the second quarter, the Rams' domination began with RB Stephen Jackson getting a 4-yard TD run and a 10-yard TD pass from QB Marc Bulger. In the third quarter, Wilkins kicked a 53-yard field goal, while Stephen Jackson got a 3-yard TD run. In the fourth quarter, Stephen Jackson wrapped up the game for St. Louis with a 59-yard TD run. Afterwards, Minnesota got their remaining points with RB Chester Taylor getting a 1-yard TD run, while Tarvaris Jackson completed a 3-yard TD pass to WR Travis Taylor. Afterwards, the Rams ended the game with a victory to end their season at 8–8.

== Season record ==
RB Steven Jackson, who was elected to his first Pro Bowl at the conclusion of the season, led the NFL in 2006 with 2,334 total yards from scrimmage. His 90 pass receptions and 806 receiving yards were also NFL records amongst all running backs that year. Jackson was named the St. Louis Rams MVP and also received one vote for NFL Offensive Player of the Year. Although the Rams did not make the playoffs in 2006, they did finish the season with an offense which produced a 4,000-yard passer in QB Marc Bulger, a 1,500-yard rusher in RB Steven Jackson, and two 1,000-yard receivers, one of only four offenses in NFL history to accomplish the feat.
