= Jerry Olsavsky =

American football player and coach (born 1967)

Duquesne Dukes
- Title: Defensive assistant

Personal information
- Born: March 29, 1967 (age 59); Youngstown, Ohio, U.S.
- Listed height: 6 ft 1 in (1.85 m)
- Listed weight: 221 lb (100 kg)

Career information
- High school: Chaney (Youngstown, Ohio)
- College: Pittsburgh
- NFL draft: 1989: 10th round, 258th overall pick

Career history

Playing
- Pittsburgh Steelers (1989–1997); Cincinnati Bengals (1998)*; Baltimore Ravens (1998)
- * Offseason or practice squad member only

Coaching
- Youngstown State (2003–2009) Linebackers coach; Pittsburgh Steelers (2010–2014) Defensive assistant; Pittsburgh Steelers (2015–2022) Inside linebackers coach; Duquesne (2023–present) Defensive assistant

Awards and highlights
- PFWA All-Rookie Team (1989); First-team All-American (1988); First-team All-East (1988); Second-team All-East (1987)

Career NFL statistics
- Tackles: 232
- Sacks: 2.5
- Forced fumbles: 4
- Interceptions: 1
- Stats at Pro Football Reference

Jerome Donald Olsavsky (born March 29, 1967) is an American former professional football player who was a linebacker and coach in the National Football League (NFL). He played for the Pittsburgh Steelers, Baltimore Ravens and the Cincinnati Bengals.

== Playing career ==
Olsavsky was born in the industrial town of Youngstown, Ohio. He gained early recognition as a star football player at Chaney High School and went on to play collegiately at the University of Pittsburgh. Following his graduation, he was selected by the Steelers in the tenth round of the 1989 NFL draft. Olsavsky finished his playing career in 1998 with the Baltimore Ravens.

== Coaching career ==
When Olsavsky ended his career in professional football, he spent several years coaching in various places, such as Carnegie Mellon University. He also served as an assistant strength coach at North Carolina for one season. He then served as an assistant football coach at Youngstown State University for seven seasons coaching linebackers.

Olsavsky was hired on January 29, 2010, to serve as the defensive assistant for the Pittsburgh Steelers, replacing Lou Spanos. He was promoted to inside linebackers coach on February 6, 2015. On February 22, 2023, the Steelers hired Aaron Curry to replace Olsavsky as their inside linebackers coach.

In 2023, Olsavsky was hired as a defensive assistant for Duquesne.

== Personal life ==
Olsavsky resides in Pittsburgh with his three children, Joseph, Martone, and Dominic.
