= Youngstown High School =

Upcoming public high school in Youngstown, Ohio U.S.

Location
- 474 Bennington Avenue; Youngstown, Ohio 44505; United States; 41°06′10″N 80°37′16″W

Information
- School type: Public
- School district: Youngstown City School District
- Grades: 9–12
- Colors: Red, blue and gold
- Athletics conference: United Athletic Conference
- Team name: Defenders
- Website: www.ycsd.org

Youngstown High School is a public high school in Youngstown, Ohio, United States. Part of the Youngstown City School District, it opened in 2026 from the consolidation of East High School and Chaney High School, and is located on the former East High School campus. Athletic teams are known as the Defenders and compete in the Ohio High School Athletic Association. It will join the United Athletic Conference in 2027.

== History ==
Youngstown High School was established in 2026 from the merger of Youngstown City School District's two existing secondary schools, East High School and Chaney High School, as part of a district-wide reconfiguration plan. In the original press release, the high school was set to be named as Youngstown Unified High School, but was later renamed to simply Youngstown High School. The school is located in the East High School building. The Youngstown Board of Education approved spending of roughly $3 million in March 2026 for renovations to the East High School campus.

== Athletics ==
Youngstown High School will compete in the United Athletic Conference beginning in winter 2027, due to football schedules for all member schools being set before the league was created. Youngstown High School offers the following sports:

- Baseball
- Basketball
- Bowling
- Cheerleading
- Cross country
- Girls flag football
- Football
- Soccer
- Softball
- Track and field
- Volleyball
- Wrestling
