= Ken Smith (baseball) =

American baseball player (born 1958)

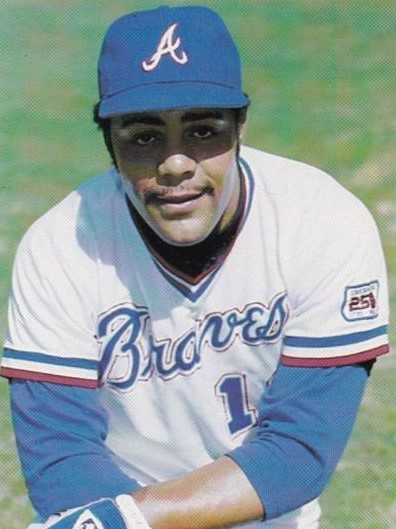
- First baseman
- Born: February 12, 1958 (age 68); Youngstown, Ohio, U.S.
- Batted: Left Threw: Right

MLB debut
- September 22, 1981, for the Atlanta Braves

Last MLB appearance
- June 14, 1983, for the Atlanta Braves

MLB statistics
- Batting average: .268
- Home runs: 1
- Runs batted in: 5
- Stats at Baseball Reference

Teams
- Atlanta Braves (1981–1983)

Kenneth Earl Smith (born February 12, 1958) is an American former Major League Baseball player who served as a reserve first baseman for the Atlanta Braves between 1981 and 1983.

Smith was born in Youngstown, Ohio, where he gained early recognition as a star athlete at the city's East High School. In 1976, he garnered national attention when he became the Atlanta Braves' No. 1 selection in the free agent draft.

Following a spring training that produced a .400 average, Smith was assigned to a Class A club in Greenwood, South Carolina, in the Western Carolinas League.

== Minor league career ==
At Greenwood, Smith earned a batting average of .369 in 1977.

Club manager Bobby Dews assessed Smith's performance as follows: "Kenny Smith is one of our top prospects in our minor league organization. And, he's a sure bet to make it to the parent Atlanta Braves if he continues to display the desire and determination that has him hitting at a .369 figure right now." Between 1978 and 1979, Smith played for an Atlanta Braves Class AA farm team in Savannah and spent an additional two years with a Class AAA club in Richmond.

== Major league career ==
Smith joined the Braves in 1981 and saw action in three regular season games. During spring training of 1982, he batted over .300 and looked forward to playing with the Braves in the upcoming season. In April of that year, however, Smith was optioned to Richmond after Atlanta obtained first baseman-outfielder Bob Watson from the New York Yankees. He often found himself in transit from Richmond to Atlanta. In 1982, Smith batted .293 in a pinch-hitting role for the Braves. He spent his final season with the Braves.

On October 20, 1983, Smith was granted free agency. He re-signed with the Braves to a minor league contract and played two more seasons in the Braves organization. After spending the 1986 season playing in the Baltimore Orioles organization, his professional baseball playing career ended.
