= Sherman Smith =

American football player and coach (born 1954)

No. 47
- Position: Running back

Personal information
- Born: November 1, 1954 (age 72); Youngstown, Ohio, U.S.
- Listed height: 6 ft 4 in (1.93 m)
- Listed weight: 225 lb (102 kg)

Career information
- High school: Youngstown (OH) North
- College: Miami (OH)
- NFL draft: 1976: 2nd round, 58th overall pick

Career history

Playing
- Seattle Seahawks (1976–1982); San Diego Chargers (1983)

Coaching
- Redmond (WA) HS (1984–1989) Assistant; Miami (OH) (1990–1991) Running backs coach; Illinois (1992–1994) Tight ends coach; Houston Oilers/Tennessee Titans (1995–2007) Running backs coach; Washington Redskins (2008–2009) Offensive coordinator & running backs coach; Seattle Seahawks (2010–2017) Running backs coach

Awards and highlights
- Super Bowl champion (XLVIII)

Career NFL statistics
- Rushing attempts: 834
- Rushing yards: 3,520
- Receptions: 217
- Receiving yards: 2,393
- Total TDs: 38
- Stats at Pro Football Reference
- Coaching profile at Pro Football Reference

Sherman Lennell Smith (born November 1, 1954) is an American former professional football player who was a running back for eight seasons with the Seattle Seahawks and San Diego Chargers between 1976 and 1983. He was also the running backs coach for the Seahawks, as well as the former offensive coordinator for the Washington Redskins. After his playing days were over, he embarked upon a second career as a football coach, starting at Redmond Jr. high school, then college, and finally back in the National Football League (NFL) with the Houston Oilers/Tennessee Titans, Redskins, and Seahawks.

== Early life ==
Smith played quarterback of the North High School football team in his native Youngstown, Ohio. After graduation, he attended Miami University in Ohio, playing the same position and leading the Redskins to the Mid-American Conference title in each of his last three seasons, with a stellar record of 33–1–1.

He is a cousin of former NFL tight end Mike Cobb, whose playing career at Michigan State overlapped with Smith's at Miami. Their respective teams faced each other in the 1975 season, with Michigan State winning 14–13 which was Miami’s only regular season loss that year.

== Professional playing career ==
Smith was selected in the second round of the 1976 NFL draft by the Seattle Seahawks as a running back. As a Seahawk, Smith was called "The Tank" in reference to the Sherman Tank because of his performance to run through tackles. He was the first offensive player picked by the new expansion team in its first season. He was the first Seahawk to rush for over 100 yards in a game when he ran for 124 yards against the Atlanta Falcons on November 7, 1976. Smith led the team in rushing in his first four seasons, eventually amassing 3,429 yards and 28 touchdowns in his seven years with the team. He also caught the ball 210 times for a total of 2,445 yards and 10 touchdowns. He played sparingly for the San Diego Chargers in the 1983 season.

== NFL career statistics ==
Legend
**Bold**	Career high

Year	Team	Games		Rushing					Receiving				
Year	Team	GP	GS	Att	Yds	Avg	Lng	TD	Rec	Yds	Avg	Lng	TD
1976	SEA	12	9	119	537	4.5	53	4	36	384	10.7	34	1
1977	SEA	14	14	163	763	4.7	39	4	30	419	**14.0**	44	2
1978	SEA	12	12	165	**805**	**4.9**	**67**	6	28	366	13.1	**64**	1
1979	SEA	**16**	**15**	**194**	775	4.0	31	**11**	**48**	**499**	10.4	35	**4**
1980	SEA	3	2	23	94	4.1	23	0	6	72	12.0	19	1
1981	SEA	**16**	8	83	253	3.0	21	3	44	406	9.2	28	1
1982	SEA	9	8	63	202	3.2	19	0	19	196	10.3	39	0
1983	SDG	13	2	24	91	3.8	20	0	6	51	8.5	21	0
		95	70	834	3,520	4.2	67	28	217	2,393	11.0	64	10

== Coaching career ==
The following year, Smith began teaching and coaching at Redmond Junior High School, then at Redmond High School in the state of Washington. He became the running back coach at Miami University, his alma mater, in 1990. Between 1992 and 1994, he worked as the tight end and running back coach at the University of Illinois. In 1995, Smith joined the staff of the Houston Oilers (now the Tennessee Titans) as running back coach, where he helped mold Eddie George into one of the league's elite running backs. The organization promoted Smith in 2006, giving him the title of assistant head coach in addition to his continuing duties as running back coach.

In 2008, Smith left the Titans to join the Washington Redskins as offensive coordinator, reuniting with his former Seahawks teammate, Jim Zorn, who had been named head coach of the Redskins.

After the 2009 season, Zorn was fired and Mike Shanahan was named as the new head coach in Washington. Smith was not retained on staff by Shanahan. Shortly thereafter Smith was reunited with his former team, the Seattle Seahawks, when hired as a position coach (running backs). He won his first Super Bowl title when the Seahawks defeated the Denver Broncos in Super Bowl XLVIII.

As of February 17, 2017, Smith was no longer with the Seattle Seahawks due to a change to the position made by head coach Pete Carroll.

== Personal life ==
Smith's children are Shavonne, Sherman, and Deland McCullough, who is the running backs coach for the Oklahoma Sooners. Smith and McCullough had known each other since Smith was recruiting McCullough to the Miami RedHawks when McCullough was 17, but only discovered they were biologically related in 2017, as detailed in the ESPN.com feature "," and the 2021 Kendrick Brothers film Show Me the Father. Deland’s son, Diem McCullough, is also Smith’s grandson. Smith is also the grandfather of Isaiah, Sherman, and Destiny — the children of his son Sherman. Destiny ran track collegiately at the University of North Carolina Wilmington; he is also the grandfather of Victoria ("Vickie"), the adopted daughter of his daughter Shavonne. His brother, Darrell K. Smith, was a former CFL All-Star.
