= Chaney High School =

Coordinates: 41.092°N 80.696°W

Location
- 731 South Hazelwood Avenue; Youngstown, Ohio 44502; United States

Information
- Type: Public, Coeducational high school
- Founded: 1925
- Closed: 2026
- School district: Youngstown City School District
- NCES School ID: 390451602063
- Principal: Robert Kearns
- Teaching staff: 32.00 (FTE)
- Grades: 9–12
- Enrollment: 536 (2024–25)
- Student to teacher ratio: 16.75
- Colors: Red and gray
- Team name: Cowboys
- Website: chaney.ycsd.org

Chaney High School was a public high school in Youngstown, Ohio, United States. Part of the Youngstown City School District, it was established in 1925 and closed in 2026 following consolidation into Youngstown High School. Athletic teams were known as the Cowboys and competed in the Ohio High School Athletic Association.

== History ==
Chaney High School opened in 1925 as West High School, on Youngstown’s west side as part of a broader expansion of the Youngstown City School District during the city’s industrial peak. The school was renamed for John J. Chaney, a local educator and administrator, and quickly became one of the district’s primary secondary institutions alongside Rayen High School and Woodrow Wilson High School. A new high school was dedicated in 1955.

Chaney High School was closed as a public high school in 2011, eliminating its sports programs along with it. Chaney was reestablished as a campus-style facility housing multiple programs, including a traditional academic high school and a STEM-focused program, as well as a performing arts school. This transformation was part of a district-wide effort to modernize facilities and improve academic outcomes with support from state construction funding initiatives.

Chaney reopened as a public high school in 2017 along with their athletic programs, announced by Youngstown City School District CEO Krish Mohip that the school would return to a traditional structure as part of the entire district being reconfigured into neighborhood schooling.

In 2025, the district announced a major reconfiguration plan that would consolidate Chaney and East High School into a single unified high school, Youngstown High School, beginning in the 2026–2027 school year, reflecting ongoing efforts to adapt to enrollment trends and resource constraints. Chaney subsequently closed in May 2026.

== Athletics ==
Chaney High School offered:

- Baseball
- Basketball
- Bowling
- Cheerleading
- Cross country
- Golf
- Football
- Softball
- Track and field
- Volleyball
- Wrestling

== Notable alumni ==
- Thomas Bopp - astronomer and co-discoverer of Comet Hale–Bopp
- Mike Kabealo - former professional football player in the National Football League (NFL)
- Frank Sinkwich - former college football player
- Jerry Olsavsky - former professional football player in the National Football League (NFL)
- Mike Zordich - former professional football player in the National Football League (NFL) and football coach
- Matt Cavanaugh - former professional football player in the National Football League (NFL)
- Anthony Floyd - former professional football player in the National Football League (NFL)
- Brad Smith - former professional football player in the National Football League (NFL)
- Keilen Dykes - former professional football player in the National Football League (NFL)
