= Rich Buzin =

American football player (1946–2020)

No. 77, 73
- Position: Offensive tackle

Personal information
- Born: January 25, 1946; Youngstown, Ohio, U.S.
- Died: September 5, 2020 (aged 74); Youngstown, Ohio, U.S.
- Listed height: 6 ft 5 in (1.96 m)
- Listed weight: 255 lb (116 kg)

Career information
- High school: Woodrow Wilson (Youngstown)
- College: Penn State (1964–1967)
- NFL draft: 1968: 2nd round, 41st overall pick

Career history
- New York Giants (1968–1970); Los Angeles Rams (1971); Chicago Bears (1972); Houston Oilers (1973)*; Florida Blazers (1974)
- * Offseason or practice squad member only

Career NFL statistics
- Games played: 49
- Games started: 28
- Fumble recoveries: 1
- Stats at Pro Football Reference

Richard Lawrence Buzin (January 25, 1946 – September 5, 2020) was an American professional football offensive tackle who played five seasons in the National Football League (NFL) with the New York Giants, Los Angeles Rams, and Chicago Bears. He was selected by the Giants in the second round of the 1968 NFL/AFL draft after playing college football at Pennsylvania State University.

== Early life and college ==
Richard Lawrence Buzin was born on January 25, 1946, in Youngstown, Ohio. He attended Woodrow Wilson High School in Youngstown.

Buzin was a member of the Penn State Nittany Lions of Pennsylvania State University from 1964 to 1967 and a two-year letterman from 1966 to 1967.

== Professional career ==
Buzin was selected by the New York Giants in the second round, with the 41st overall pick, of the 1968 NFL draft. He played in all 14 games, starting one, for the Giants during his rookie year in 1968 and recovered one fumble. He appeared in all 14 games for the second consecutive season, starting 13, in 1969. The Giants finished the year with a 6–8 record. Houston started all 14 games in 1970 as the Giants finished 9–5.

On August 12, 1971, Buzin was traded to the Los Angeles Rams for Joe Taffoni. Buzin played in five games for the Rams in 1971.

On August 8, 1972, Buzin was traded to the Chicago Bears for an undisclosed draft pick. He played in two games for the Bears during the 1972 season.

On July 6, 1973, Buzin was traded to the Houston Oilers for an undisclosed draft pick.

Buzin signed with the Florida Blazers of the World Football League (WFL) on June 13, 1974. He played for the Blazers during the 1974 WFL season. He was later cut during the middle of the season.

== Personal life ==
Buzin died on September 5, 2020, in Youngstown at the age of 74.
