= Sebron Spivey =

American football player (born 1964)

No. 80
- Position: Wide receiver

Personal information
- Born: August 2, 1964 (age 62); Youngstown, Ohio, U.S.
- Listed height: 5 ft 11 in (1.80 m)
- Listed weight: 180 lb (82 kg)

Career information
- High school: Rayen (Youngstown)
- College: Southern Illinois
- NFL draft: 1987: undrafted

Career history
- Dallas Cowboys (1987)

Career NFL statistics
- Receptions: 2
- Receiving yards: 34
- Return yards: 49
- Stats at Pro Football Reference

Sebron Ervin Spivey (born August 2, 1964) is an American former professional football player who was a wide receiver in the National Football League (NFL) for the Dallas Cowboys. He played college football for the Southern Illinois Salukis.

== Early life ==
Spivey attended Rayen High School, where he played as a wide receiver. He accepted a football scholarship from Southern Illinois University. As a sophomore in 1984, he was suspended because of academic reasons.

As a junior, he was named a starter at wide receiver. He tied the NCAA Division I record with 2 punt returns for touchdowns in a single-game and also set the school punt return yardage record (143 yards) against Southeast Missouri State University on October 19, 1985.

As a senior, he led the team in receiving with 25 catches for 336 yards and 4 touchdowns. He had 102 receiving yards against Missouri State University on November 7, 1986. He finished fourth in school history with 336 career punt return yards and second with an 8.84-yard punt return average.

== Professional career ==
Spivey was signed as an undrafted free agent by the Dallas Cowboys after the 1987 NFL draft. He was waived on August 31.

After the NFLPA strike was declared on the third week of the 1987 season, those contests were canceled (reducing the 16-game season to 15) and the NFL decided that the games would be played with replacement players. In September, he was re-signed to be a part of the Dallas replacement team that was given the mock name "Rhinestone Cowboys" by the media. Although he was named a starter at wide receiver opposite of Cornell Burbage in the first game against the New York Jets, he was passed on the depth chart, after Kelvin Edwards posted 2 receptions for 68 yards and 2 touchdowns. Spivey suffered a rib injury against the Philadelphia Eagles, while making a contested catch late in the second quarter. He was placed on the injured reserve list on October 27. He was released on November 3.
