= Nick Nardacci =

American football player (1901–1961)

Profile
- Positions: Halfback; quarterback

Personal information
- Born: May 24, 1901; Youngstown, Ohio, U.S.
- Died: August 28, 1961 (aged 60); Youngstown, Ohio, U.S.
- Listed height: 5 ft 10 in (1.78 m)
- Listed weight: 160 lb (73 kg)

Career information
- High school: Rayen (Youngstown)
- College: West Virginia

Career history
- Cleveland Bulldogs (1925)

Awards and highlights
- Second-team All-American (1922)
- Stats at Pro Football Reference

Nicholas James Nardacci (May 24, 1901 – August 28, 1961) was an American professional football halfback and quarterback. He played college football for the West Virginia Mountaineers and joined the Cleveland Bulldogs of the National Football League (NFL) for one season in 1925.

== Early life ==
Nardacci was born in Youngstown, Ohio and graduated from Rayen High School in Youngstown.

== College career ==
At West Virginia University, he played college football for the West Virginia Mountaineers teams that compiled a record of 25–2–2 in Nardacci's three years as a starter from 1922 to 1924. He played on the 1922 team that played in the school's first post-season game and is the only undefeated football team in West Virginia history. Nardacci rushed for 120 yards and one touchdown in the San Diego East-West Christmas Classic, played in San Diego on Christmas Day 1922, and also threw a touchdown pass, to lead West Virginia to a win over the Gonzaga Bulldogs. He was selected as a second-team All-American by the Chicago Tribune after the 1922 season. Nardacci played an important part in West Virginia's rivalry games against the Pittsburgh Panthers and Washington & Jefferson Presidents. In the final regular-season game of 1922, Nardacci caught an 8-yard touchdown pass against Washington & Jefferson in a 14–0 win to keep West Virginia undefeated. In 1923, playing against Pop Warner's Pittsburgh Panthers, Nardacci scored a nine-yard touchdown on a sweep and caught a three-yard pass for a second touchdown. He also muffed a punt, leading to a Pittsburgh touchdown; West Virginia won the game 13–7, emerging victorious from the rivalry game in consecutive years after failing to win in the previous eleven seasons.

== Professional career ==
Nardacci played one year of professional football for the Cleveland Bulldogs in the National Football League (NFL) in 1925, playing in two games and starting in one.

== See also ==
- 1922 College Football All-America Team
