= Ron Bartell =

American football player (born 1982)

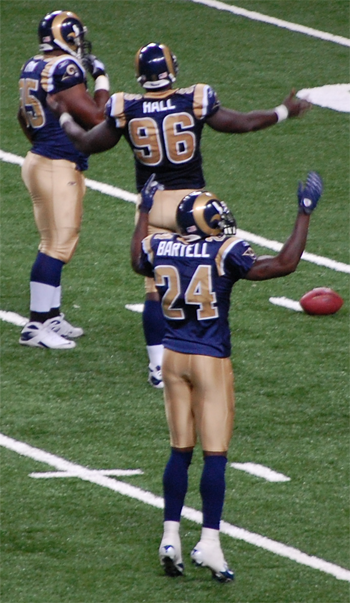
- Bartell with the St. Louis Rams in 2007

No. 32, 24, 21, 41
- Position: Cornerback

Personal information
- Born: February 22, 1982 (age 44); Detroit, Michigan, U.S.
- Listed height: 6 ft 1 in (1.85 m)
- Listed weight: 210 lb (95 kg)

Career information
- High school: Renaissance (Detroit)
- College: Central Michigan, Howard
- NFL draft: 2005: 2nd round, 50th overall pick

Career history
- St. Louis Rams (2005–2011); Oakland Raiders (2012); Detroit Lions (2012)

Career NFL statistics
- Total tackles: 353
- Sacks: 2.0
- Forced fumbles: 9
- Fumble recoveries: 3
- Interceptions: 8
- Defensive touchdowns: 1
- Stats at Pro Football Reference

Ronald Bartell (born February 22, 1982) is an American former professional football player who was a cornerback in the National Football League (NFL). He played college football for the Central Michigan Chippewas and Howard Bison. Bartell was selected by the St. Louis Rams in the second round of the 2005 NFL draft.

== Early life ==
Bartell played safety and receiver for Renaissance High School in Detroit, Michigan, from 1996 to 1999. He also ran track and played basketball. He caught 23 passes for 385 yards with four touchdowns on offense and had 45 tackles and four interceptions on defense as a senior when he was named All-City, All-Metro and City Defensive Back of the Year.

== College career ==
Bartell began his college football career at Central Michigan University but left the school in 2002 "distraught with the direction the program was going" and stated he went through five position coaches in 2½ years at the school and he felt he wasn't getting any better. He transferred to Howard University where he started in 38 out of 45 games and was an administration of criminal justice major. Bartell was a Second-team All-Mid-Eastern Athletic Conference as a senior.

== Professional career ==
Pre-draft measurables
Height	Weight	40-yard dash	Vertical jump	Bench press
6 ft 1 in (1.85 m)	211 lb (96 kg)	4.37 s	35 1/2 in (0.90 m)	21 reps
All values from NFL Combine.

=== St. Louis Rams ===
Bartell was selected by the St. Louis Rams in the second round (50th overall) in the 2005 NFL draft. On July 29, 2005, Bartell agreed to a 4-year $3.04 million contract with the Rams. In his rookie season he played in ten games making seven starts (after starting right cornerback Travis Fisher was injured) and recorded 34 tackles. In the 2006 season he made 25 tackles and three interceptions. His first career interception came at the Oakland Raiders on December 17, 2006. The 2007 season was a career best in terms of tackles made as he ended the campaign with 67, along with one sack and two interceptions.

In 2007 Bartell started the first four games in place of right cornerback Fakhir Brown who was on the NFL suspended list. Bartell ended the season starting six games for the injured left cornerback Tye Hill and in between he started two games as the Rams nickelback when the team opened in a five defensive back alignment. In 2008 Bartell again began the season starting at right corner back for Fakhir Brown, who had a broken collar bone and was released and then re-signed. After Brown returned, starting left cornerback Tye Hill was again hurt and placed on injured reserve. Bartell stepped in and started the final 11 games as the left corner. For the season he played in 16 games, starting 14 and made 56 tackles (46 solo), one sack, three interceptions, 20 passes defensed, two forced fumbles and one fumble recovered.

Bartell became a free agent following the 2008 season, but was re-signed by the Rams to a four-year, $28 million contract, including $13.6 million in guarantees on March 2, 2009. Bartell fractured his neck during the Rams' 2011 season opener vs the Philadelphia Eagles and missed the rest of the season on injured reserve. He played only 7 career games after the injury.

He was released by the Rams on March 12, 2012.

=== Oakland Raiders ===
Bartell signed with the Oakland Raiders on March 16, 2012. He was released on December 10, 2012.

=== Detroit Lions ===
Bartell signed with the Detroit Lions on December 17, 2012. He was released by the Lions on August 31, 2013.

=== NFL statistics ===
Year	Team	GP	COMB	TOTAL	AST	SACK	FF	FR	FR YDS	INT	IR YDS	AVG IR	LNG	TD	PD
2005	STL	10	34	31	3	0.0	1	0	0	0	0	0	0	0	4
2006	STL	16	25	25	0	0.0	0	0	0	3	63	21	38	1	6
2007	STL	16	67	63	4	1.0	2	1	0	2	10	5	9	0	9
2008	STL	16	57	54	3	1.0	2	1	0	3	29	10	24	0	19
2009	STL	15	66	61	5	0.0	3	1	0	0	0	0	0	0	9
2010	STL	15	61	55	6	0.0	1	0	0	0	0	0	0	0	10
2011	STL	1	1	1	0	0.0	0	0	0	0	0	0	0	0	0
2012	DET	1	9	6	3	0.0	0	0	0	0	0	0	0	0	1
2012	OAK	6	18	14	4	0.0	0	0	0	0	0	0	0	0	4
Career		96	338	310	28	2.0	9	3	0	8	102	13	38	1	62

== Personal life ==
Bartell was the owner of the restaurant "Kuzzo's Chicken & Waffles" in Detroit. He opened the restaurant in 2013. In 2020 he founded "KAHN Cannabis Co." in Detroit. The dispensary is located in the Russell Industrial Center.

Kuzzo's Chicken & Waffles closed in 2026. In November 2026, Bartell was charged with five counts of tax fraud for failing to pay sales tax from the business.
