= John Petchel =

American football player (1919–)

No. 50, 17, 57
- Positions: Blocking back, safety

Personal information
- Born: May 27, 1919; Freeland, Pennsylvania, U.S.
- Died: January 25, 1988 (aged 68); Beaver, Pennsylvania, U.S.
- Listed height: 5 ft 11 in (1.80 m)
- Listed weight: 185 lb (84 kg)

Career information
- High school: Freeland
- College: Duquesne (1938–1941)
- NFL draft: 1942: undrafted

Career history
- Cleveland Rams (1942); Steagles (1943)*; Cleveland Rams (1944); Pittsburgh Steelers (1945)
- * Offseason or practice squad member only
- Stats at Pro Football Reference

John Petchel (May 27, 1919 – January 25, 1988) was an American professional football player in the National Football League (NFL). He played college football for the Duquesne Dukes.

== Early life ==
John Petchel was born on May 27, 1919, in Freeland, Pennsylvania. He played football, basketball, and baseball at Freeland High School, graduating in 1938.

== College career ==
Petchel played college football for the Duquesne Dukes from 1938 to 1941. He was part of a Duquesne team that only lost once in three seasons.

== Professional career ==
Petchel went undrafted in the 1942 NFL draft. He signed with the Cleveland Rams on June 1, 1942. He played in seven games, starting one, for the Rams during the 1942 season as a blocking back/safety, recording one carry for negative two yards, one reception for 16 yards, and two kick returns for 26 yards. After the Rams suspended play due to World War II, Petchel was allocated to the Philadelphia Eagles. He was released by the "Steagles" on September 24, 1943, before the start of the regular season.

The Rams resumed play in 1944, and Petchel returned to the team. He played in all ten games, starting two, totaling five rushes for 11 yards, one catch for a 43-yard touchdown, two completions on three passing attempts for 27 yards, one kick return for 17 yards, and one interception on defense for 25 yards.

On August 1, 1945, Petchel and John Karrs were traded to the Pittsburgh Steelers for Eberle Schultz. Petchel appeared in nine of ten games, starting two, for the Steelers in 1945, accumulating one completion for eight yards, two carries for two yards, two receptions for 25 yards, and one interception on defense for four yards.

== Post-playing career ==
Petchel was an assistant football coach at Baldwin High School in Pittsburgh from 1946 to 1948. He was then the freshman football coach at Duquesne in 1949 and the assistant varsity coach in 1950. He was the head coach at Midland High School in Pennsylvania from 1951 to 1959 and had a 59–20–6 record. Petchel helped Midland win the WPIAL Class A title in 1952 and share the WPIAL Class B title in 1954.

Petchel retired as a teacher in 1975 due to poor health. He was inducted into the Beaver County Sports Hall of Fame in 1984. He died on January 25, 1988, in Beaver, Pennsylvania.
