= North High School (Youngstown, Ohio) =

Location
- Liberty Rd. Youngstown, Ohio 44505; United States

Information
- Established: c. 1900s
- Closed: 1980
- School district: Youngstown City School District
- Grades: 9–12
- Campus type: Urban
- Colors: Red, Black
- Athletics conference: Youngstown City Series
- Mascot: Bulldogs
- Website: Youngstown City Schools

North High School was a public high school in Youngstown, Ohio, United States. It was a part of the Youngstown City School District. Athletic teams were known as the Bulldogs. The school opened around the 1900s, under the name Scienceville High School, before being renamed to North in 1945. The high school was shut down following the 1979–1980 school year due to declining enrollment and population in the city of Youngstown.

== History ==
North High School originated as part of the Scienceville area school system in Coitsville Township, where a schoolhouse existed as early as 1840. The first formal secondary school in the area developed in the early 1900s as Scienceville High School, serving the northern sections of what later became Youngstown’s east side. This reflects the broader expansion of township high schools in Ohio during that era.

By the 1920s, the Scienceville school system had expanded into multiple buildings, including a second high school structure built in 1922 across from the original Liberty Road site. These buildings reflected population growth in the area and increasing demand for secondary education prior to full urban annexation by Youngstown.

In 1928, Coitsville Township including the Scienceville school area was annexed into the City of Youngstown. This transferred control of the school system into the Youngstown City School District, aligning it with the city’s rapidly growing industrial population during the steel boom era.

The school was renamed North High School in 1945 after student and community pressure to replace the “Scienceville” name, which many felt was not widely recognized outside the neighborhood. Despite opposition from some alumni, the Youngstown Board of Education approved the change.

A new North High School building opened in 1956 on Mariner Avenue, replacing earlier structures. This facility represented postwar investment in Youngstown public schools during the city’s population peak, when industrial employment supported large neighborhood-based high schools. The earlier buildings were repurposed or demolished following the relocation.

North High School was closed after the 1979–1980 school year due to declining enrollment caused by population loss and industrial decline in Youngstown during the collapse of the steel industry. The closure was part of broader consolidation within the Youngstown City School District as multiple high schools were shut down during the same period.

== Notable alumni ==
- Tommy Bell, former professional boxer
- Mike Cobb, former professional football player
- A. J. Jones, former professional football player
- John Nocera, former professional football player
- Sherman Smith, former professional football player and coach
