= Walter J. West =

American football player and coach (1917–1984)

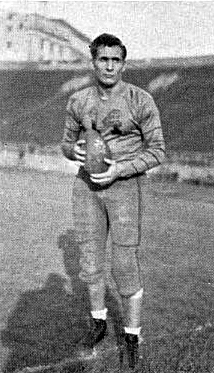
- West as a quarterback for the Pittsburgh Panthers in 1942

Biographical details
- Born: October 26, 1917; Burgettstown, Pennsylvania, U.S.
- Died: September 13, 1984 (aged 66); Carlsbad, California, U.S.

Playing career
- 1941–1942: Pittsburgh
- 1943: Randolph Field
- 1944: Cleveland Rams
- Positions: Quarterback, fullback

Coaching career (HC unless noted)
- 1946–1948: Geneva (assistant)
- 1949–1952: Geneva

Head coaching record
- Overall: 18–14–2

Walter James West (October 26, 1917 – September 13, 1984) was an American football player and coach.

== Playing career ==
West played quarterback at the University of Pittsburgh for the Panthers during the 1941 and 1942 seasons, graduating from the university with a bachelor of science from the School of Education in 1943. Thereafter entering the Army, West played fullback for the intercollegiate football team fielded by the Army Air Forces' Randolph Field base in 1943. That season the Randolph Field Ramblers achieved a 9–1 record and appeared in the 1944 Cotton Bowl Classic.

=== Cleveland Rams ===
West played professionally in the National Football League (NFL) for the Cleveland Rams in 1944 and was the leading rusher for the team that year. He played in nine games that year and carried the ball 66 times for a total of 220 yards and scored one touchdown. He also pulled in 9 receptions for an additional 64 yards and played some on defense, recording two interceptions.

== Coaching career ==
=== High school ===
Prior to coaching in college, West coached high school football and basketball at Leechburg High School.

=== Geneva College ===
West was named the 21st head football coach at the Geneva College in Beaver Falls, Pennsylvania. He held that position for four years, from 1949 until 1952. His coaching record at Geneva was 18–14–2. Geneva College fans generally consider him among the best coaches the school has had.
