= Rayen High School =

The Rayen School

Location
- Cordova & Benita Aves. Youngstown, Ohio 44504; United States

Information
- School district: Youngstown City School District
- Grades: 9–12
- Campus type: Urban
- Colors: Orange, Black
- Athletics conference: Youngstown City Series; Steel Valley Conference
- Mascot: Tigers
- Website: Youngstown City Schools

The Rayen School (also known as Rayen High School and colloquially as simply Rayen) was a public high school in Youngstown, Ohio, United States. At the time it was closed in 2007, it was the oldest of the three high schools in the city. The high school's most recent physical plant opened in 1923, when the institution was relocated from a 19th-century structure located at 120 W Wood Street in Youngstown that currently houses Youngstown's Board of Education.

Rayen closed permanently in June 2007, to make way for the opening of a consolidated East High School. The former Rayen building was scheduled for demolition, and the municipal school board announced that a middle school would be erected on the site. The 87-year-old school building was razed, and although plans were made to build a middle school on the site, the plans were later abandoned because of declining enrollment.

In the wake of this development, trustees of the Judge William Rayen Foundation publicly expressed concern that the Youngstown Board of Education would dispose of the 19th century structure that housed the original Rayen School. The board, however, denied that it had any plans to sell the building or move the school board to new offices. In a February 2009 meeting, school board president Anthony Catale stated, "The Rayen building isn't going anywhere".

== History ==
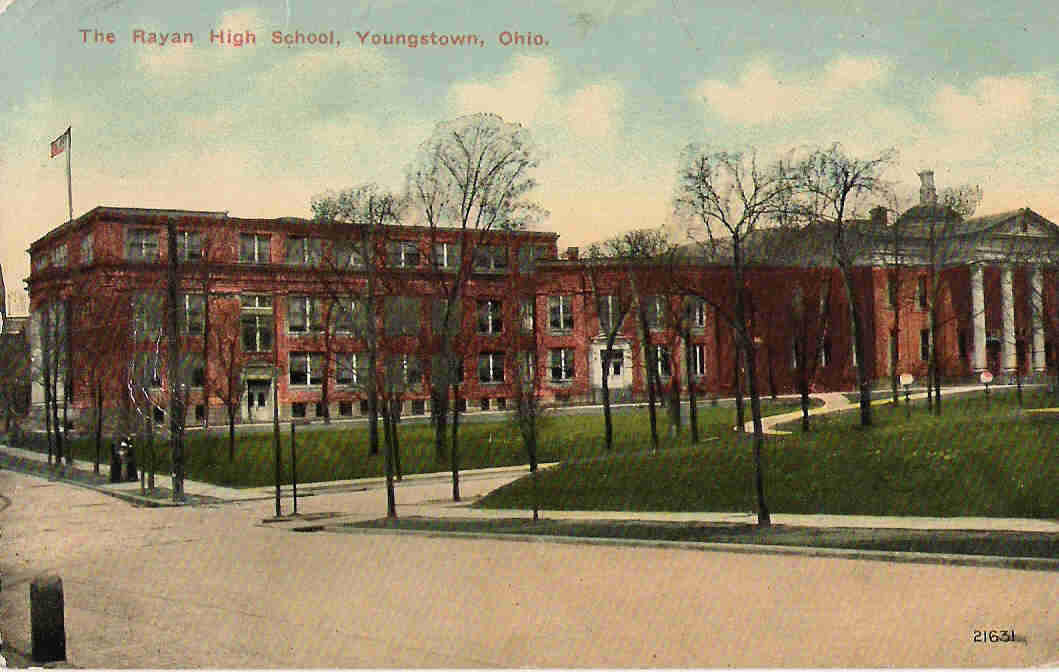
Rayen High School in 1912.

A long-time fixture in the Youngstown City School District system, The Rayen School opened its doors to 40 students in September 1866. Provisions for the school were made through a legacy of Colonel William Rayen, a judge and former military officer who fought in the War of 1812. Rayen, who died in 1854, left a residual estate of $31,000, which he set aside for the establishment and maintenance of a secondary school. Rayen specified that the school should be free and open to students of all backgrounds.

The original school building, which still stands at 120 W Wood Street, was built in the Greek Revival style. The building's appearance has changed little since its construction in the 19th century, and it is currently listed on the National Register of Historic Places. In response to expanding enrollment, a larger physical plant was erected on the upper North Side of Youngstown in 1922 at 250 Benita Ave. The original building served concurrently as an elementary school and a school of engineering for Youngstown College before its purchase by Youngstown City School District.

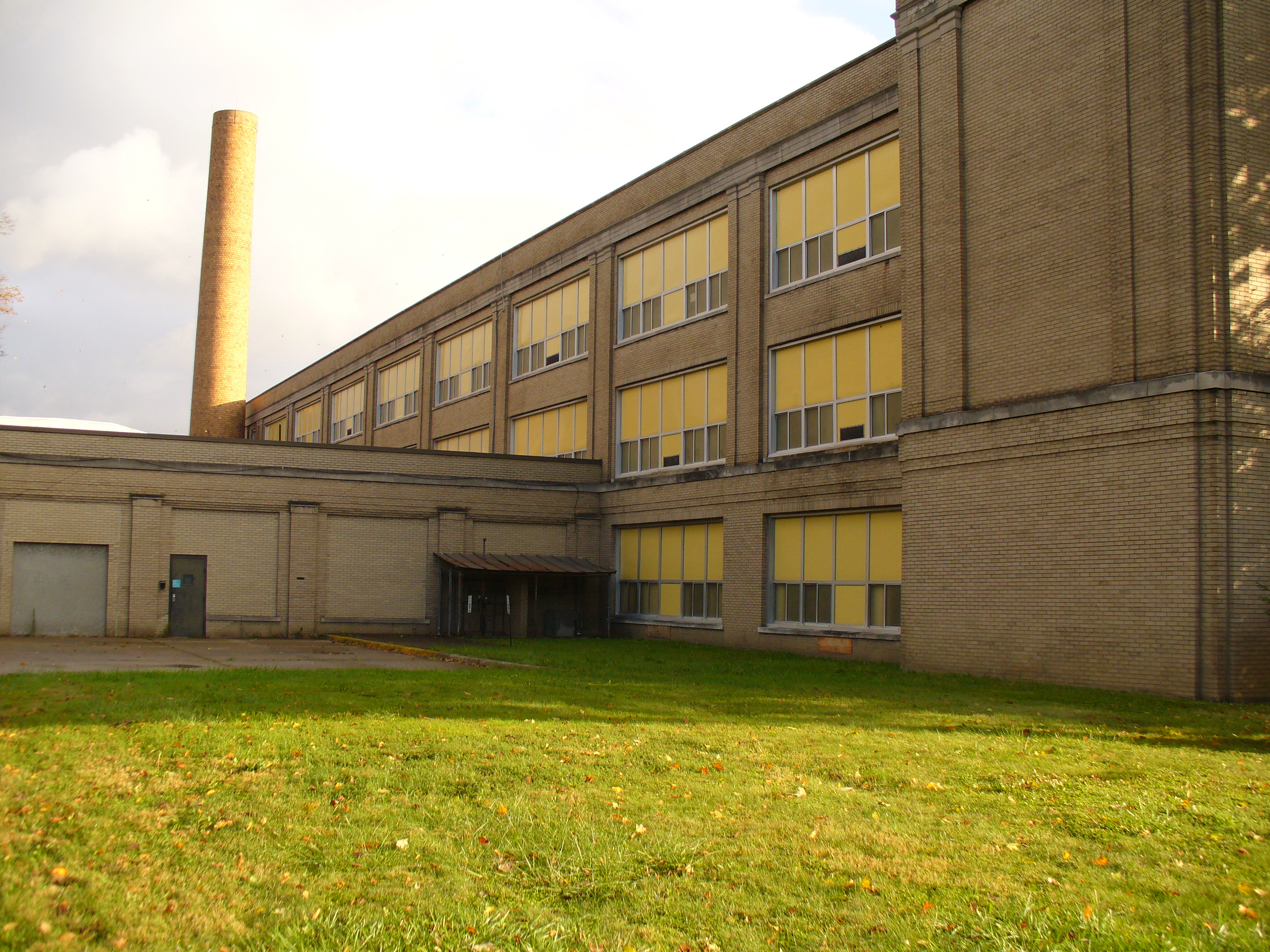
Second location of Rayen High School in 2007

The Rayen School, following its relocation, continued to operate on funds generated by the Rayen estate, which was managed by a board of trustees. Rayen was widely admired for its rigorous academic standards and drew students from throughout Northeastern Ohio. In the 1940s, the institution became popularly known as "The Rayen School".

During its lengthy history, Rayen was led by 19 principals and graduated more than 50,000 students. Much of Rayen's colorful past was commemorated in a 65-foot (20 m)-long mural painted by Rayen art instructor John Benninger in the late 1950s. The Rayen mural was removed from the former high school building for cleaning and restoration in 2007. The restored mural was supposed to be installed at Rayen Middle School, a facility scheduled to be built on the site of the former high school.

Although Rayen continued to maintain high academic standards, the school was adversely affected by trends that disrupted many other urban institutions. Beginning in the post-World War II era, urban depopulation and the decline of Youngstown's manufacturing sector contributed to challenges such as falling enrollment and reduced funding.

== Sports ==
Rayen's sports team competed as the Tigers. The school holds one Ohio High School Athletic Association State Championship, a Boys' Basketball crown from 1985. Rayen's stadium, built in 1924, was the site of athletic events for nearby schools. For decades, it served as "home field" to Ursuline High School, located a few blocks south, and Youngstown State University.

In addition, Rayen Stadium was the site of a significant development in American football history. The first penalty flag was thrown at the stadium in 1941, when it served as home field for then-Youngstown College. Youngstown College coach Dwight "Dike" Beede created the flag to replace the alarms that were generally used at the time. He recognized that some fans couldn't hear the alarms because of surrounding noise.

The stadium fell into disuse after 1982, with the completion of Youngstown State University's Stambaugh Stadium. Rayen and other city schools began to use Stambaugh Stadium for their home games. Before 2006, the last high school football game played on Youngstown City School District property was in 1995 at South High School–once the home field for Cardinal Mooney High School. South High School, on the main thoroughfare of Market Street, closed in 1993.

In 2005, the Tigers went 7–3 to win their first Youngstown City Title since 1989 — when the Youngstown City Series still had five high schools. On September 30, 2006 Rayen hosted Akron East High School for the first game at Rayen Stadium in 24 years. The game also allowed alumni to have one last public tour of the school before it closed at the end of the 2006–2007 school year.

After much fundraising, the football stadium at Rayen was repaired and the field was named for Rayen alum Jack Antonucci, all prior to the 2012 football stadium. The stadium had originally been built in 1924.

== Notable alumni ==
- Doc Elliott, former NFL player
- Billy Evans (1884 – 1956) – Hall of Fame umpire
- Joe Flynn (1924 – 1974) – comedic actor
- Roger M. Kyes (1906 – 1971) – former General Motors executive and Deputy Secretary of Defense in the Eisenhower administration
- Jimmy McAleer (1864 – 1931) – major league baseball player and manager
- Nick Nardacci, former NFL player
- Craig Powell, former NFL player
- Sebron Spivey, former NFL player
- William R. Stewart (1864 – 1958) – 19th-century Ohio lawmaker
- Omarosa Manigault Newman (1974 – ) – celebrated TV personality and Trump White House official
- Terry Taylor, former NFL player
- Albert Warner, co-founder of Warner Bros. studio.
