= Moose Dunstan =

American football player (1915–1999)

Elwyn "Moose" Dunstan
- Dunstan with the Rams in 1940

No. 38, 20
- Position: Tackle

Personal information
- Born: February 4, 1915; San Francisco, California, U.S.
- Died: March 12, 1999 (aged 84); Oakland, California, U.S.
- Listed height: 6 ft 3 in (1.91 m)
- Listed weight: 238 lb (108 kg)

Career information
- High school: Castlemont (Oakland, California)
- College: Santa Clara, Portland

Career history
- Chicago Cardinals (1938–1939); Cleveland Rams (1939–1941)

Career statistics
- Games: 33
- Starts: 23
- Rushing yards: 6
- Stats at Pro Football Reference

William Elwyn "Moose" Dunstan Jr. (February 4, 1915 – March 12, 1999) was an American football player. He played professionally in the National Football League (NFL) as a tackle for the Chicago Cardinals from 1938 to 1939 and the Cleveland Rams from 1939 to 1941.

== Biography ==
=== Early life ===
Dunstan was born in 1915 in San Francisco. He attended Castlemont High School in Oakland, California. He played college football at Marin Junior College (1933), Santa Clara University (1934), and the University of Portland (1935–1937).

=== Professional football ===
Dunstan played professional football in the National Football League (NFL) as a tackle for the Chicago Cardinals (1938–1939) and Cleveland Rams (1939–1941). He appeared in 33 NFL games, 23 as a starter. He also played for the Oakland Giants of the Pacific Coast Football League (PCFL) in 1943.

=== Family and later years ===
After his football career ended, Dunstan lived in Oakland, California. He worked as an insurance executive. He served as chairman of Oakland's Board of Park Commissioners and ran unsuccessfully for a season on the Oakland City Council in 1953 and the Board of Education in 1965. Dunstan died in 1999 in Oakland at age 84.

Dunstan and his wife, Florence, had four children: Marion, Bill, Joellen, and Nancy. Their son, Bill Dunstan, played in the NFL.
