= Bill Dunstan =

American football player (1949-present)

No. 61, 76, 66
- Position: Defensive tackle

Personal information
- Born: January 3, 1949 (age 77); Oakland, California, U.S.
- Died: February 15, 2022; Oakland, California U.S.
- Listed height: 6 ft 4 in (1.93 m)
- Listed weight: 250 lb (113 kg)

Career information
- High school: Oakland (CA) Skyline
- College: Utah State
- NFL draft: 1971: 14th round, 361st overall pick

Career history
- Philadelphia Eagles (1973–1976); Buffalo Bills (1977); Los Angeles Rams (1979)

Career NFL statistics
- Sacks: 12
- Fumble recoveries: 4
- Defensive TDs: 1
- Stats at Pro Football Reference

William Elwyn Dunstan (born January 3, 1949 - died February 15, 2022) was an American professional football defensive lineman in the National Football League (NFL) for the San Francisco 49ers, New York Jets, Philadelphia Eagles, Buffalo Bills, and the Los Angeles Rams. He played college football at Utah State University.

== Personal life ==
He is the son of former NFL offensive tackle Elwyn Dunstan.
