= Victor Adeyanju =

American football player (born 1983)

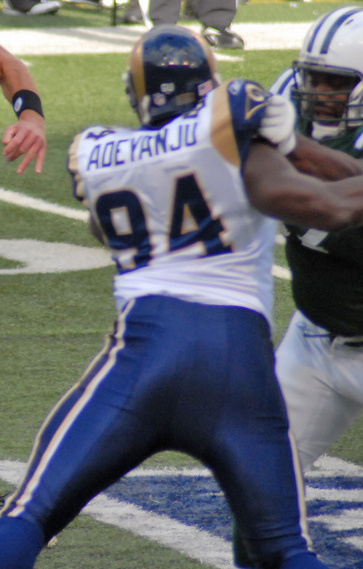
- Adeyanju in 2008

No. 94, 95
- Position: Defensive end

Personal information
- Born: February 11, 1983 (age 43); Chicago, Illinois, U.S.
- Listed height: 6 ft 4 in (1.93 m)
- Listed weight: 284 lb (129 kg)

Career information
- High school: Curie (Chicago)
- College: Indiana
- NFL draft: 2006: 4th round, 113th overall pick

Career history
- St. Louis Rams (2006–2009); Cincinnati Bengals (2010)

Awards and highlights
- Second-team All-Big Ten (2005)

Career NFL statistics
- Total tackles: 131
- Sacks: 3
- Fumble recoveries: 4
- Pass deflections: 2
- Defensive touchdowns: 1
- Stats at Pro Football Reference

Victor Adeyanju (born February 11, 1983) is an American former professional football player who was a defensive end in the National Football League (NFL). He played college football for the Indiana Hoosiers and was selected by the St. Louis Rams in the fourth round of the 2006 NFL draft.

He was also a member of the Cincinnati Bengals. His younger brother James Adeyanju was a defensive end for the 2014 Wisconsin Badgers football team.

== Early life ==
Born in Chicago, Adeyanju moved to the United States at age seven after living a few years in Nigeria. Adeyanju attended and graduated from Nightingale Elementary School. He was a defensive end at Curie High School in Chicago. The team compiled a 10–2 record that year, as Adeyanju recorded 45 tackles with ten sacks and seventeen stops behind the line of scrimmage. He saw action as a wide receiver and returned five kickoffs for 62 yards.

== College career ==
At Indiana University Bloomington, the Hoosiers coaching staff decided to redshirt Victor in 2001, allowing him more time for his leg injury to heal. He started the final nine games of the 2002 season at left defensive end, producing 33 tackles (22 solos with a pair of sacks and four stops for losses. He manned the left defensive end position again as a sophomore. He managed 31 tackles (24 solos), a sack, five stops behind the line of scrimmage and a forced fumble during 2003.

Adeyanju was one of six players to start every game for Indiana in 2004. He posted 40 tackles (29 solos) with four sacks and 9.5 stops for losses. He also caused three fumbles, returned a fumble recovery for a touchdown and batted away three passes. In 2005, he was named Second-team All-Big Ten Conference. He led the team with 6.5 sacks and 12 stops behind the line of scrimmage and ranked seventh with 47 tackles (32 solos). He also caused a fumble and had three pass break-ups.

In 46 games with the Hoosiers, Victor started 43 times. He finished with 151 tackles (107 solos), 13.5 sacks for losses of 104 yards and 31 stops for losses of 141 yards. He caused five fumbles and recovered another for a 4-yard touchdown return. He also deflected seven passes.

He graduated with a degree in computer science.

== Professional career ==
=== St. Louis Rams ===
Pre-draft measurables
Height	Weight	Arm length	Hand span	40-yard dash	10-yard split	20-yard split	20-yard shuttle	Three-cone drill	Vertical jump	Broad jump	Bench press
6 ft 4 1/4 in (1.94 m)	274 lb (124 kg)	33 1/4 in (0.84 m)	9 1/4 in (0.23 m)	4.69 s	1.71 s	2.88 s	4.41 s	7.37 s	32 in (0.81 m)	9 ft 4 in (2.84 m)	22 reps
All values from NFL Combine/Pro Day

Adeyanju was selected by the St. Louis Rams in the fourth round (113th overall) in the 2006 NFL draft. He signed a three-year $1.4 million contract with the Rams. In his rookie season he played in 12 games, recording 34 tackles and one sack and one pressure and scored his first NFL touchdown after recovering a fumble at the Seattle Seahawks on December 12.

In the 2007 season, he recorded 29 tackles and had nine pressures. In 2008, he played in 16 games for first time and had a career-high 47 tackles including a personal best 2.0 sacks and 8 quarterback pressures.

On April 17, 2009, Adeyanju signed a one-year tender worth $1.01 million, meaning he will be under contract for the 2009 season with the St. Louis Rams for his fourth season. On March 30, 2010, Adeyanju signed a one-year tender contract for a non-guaranteed salary of $1.176 million.

On September 4, 2010, prior to the start of the regular season Adeyanju was waived by the Rams.

=== Cincinnati Bengals ===
On November 18, 2010, Adeyanju signed with the Cincinnati Bengals and was waived on November 24. He was inactive for the only game he was with Cincinnati, a 49–31 home loss to Buffalo. He was released on September 3, 2011.

== NFL career statistics ==
Legend
	Led the league
**Bold**	Career high

Year	Team	Games		Tackles					Interceptions					Fumbles			
Year	Team	GP	GS	Cmb	Solo	Ast	Sck	TFL	Int	Yds	TD	Lng	PD	FF	FR	Yds	TD
2006	STL	12	**9**	42	37	5	1.0	3	0	0	0	0	**1**	0	**2**	**89**	**1**
2007	STL	15	7	35	26	**9**	0.0	3	0	0	0	0	**1**	0	1	24	0
2008	STL	**16**	**9**	**47**	**40**	7	**2.0**	**8**	0	0	0	0	0	0	0	0	0
2009	STL	10	1	7	6	1	0.0	0	0	0	0	0	0	0	1	0	0
		53	26	131	109	22	3.0	14	0	0	0	0	2	0	4	113	1
