= Mike Kabealo =

American football player (1915–1993)

- Kabealo with the Cleveland Rams in 1944

No. 16
- Position: Halfback

Personal information
- Born: October 1, 1915; Youngstown, Ohio, U.S.
- Died: September 24, 1993 (aged 77); Kettering, Ohio, U.S.
- Listed height: 5 ft 8 in (1.73 m)
- Listed weight: 185 lb (84 kg)

Career information
- High school: Chaney (Youngstown)
- College: Ohio State (1935—1938)
- NFL draft: 1939: undrafted

Career history
- Cleveland Rams (1944)
- Stats at Pro Football Reference

Michael T. Kabealo (October 1, 1915 – September 24, 1993) was an American professional football player who was a halfback for one season with the Cleveland Rams of the National Football League (NFL). He played college football for the Ohio State Buckeyes and was co-captain of the 1938 team. Kabealo was blind in one eye due to a childhood accident.

== Early life ==
Michael T. Kabealo was born on October 1, 1915, in Youngstown, Ohio. He was blind in his left eye due to an injury he suffered when he was seven or eight years old. He was playing cowboys and Indians with his brother Johnny when Johnny accidentally shot him in the eye with an arrow. Kabealo played high school football and basketball at Chaney High School in Youngstown. He was a forward in basketball. The Xenia Daily Gazette said Kabealo was a good football player but "not so hot" at basketball.

== College career ==
Kabealo played college football for the Ohio State Buckeyes of Ohio State University (OSU). He was on the freshman team in 1935 and was a three-year letterman from 1936 to 1938. Through the first week of practice before the 1936 season, it was reported that Kabealo had been favored to win the starting left halfback job due to his "all-around efficiency at kicking, passing, running and blocking". However, sophomore Bill Booth ended up winning the job by the time the regular season started. In the season opener against NYU on October 3, Kabealo scored a touchdown in a reserve role behind Booth while fellow backup left halfback Jumpin' Joe Williams also scored two touchdowns. Kabealo started the second game of the season on October 10 against Pittsburgh because Ohio State head coach Francis Schmidt needed someone who could punt. However, Schmidt benched Kabealo for poor punting against Pittsburgh and replaced him as starter with Williams. Through three games, Kabealo led the team in scoring with 13 points (which was noted as being far below Williams' total of 36 points through three games in 1935). Kabealo returned to the starting lineup later in the season after Williams suffered an injury. Kabealo hurt his knee in the penultimate game of the year against Illinois but returned to the starting lineup for the season finale against Michigan. He received one vote for the team's MVP award.

After Booth was killed in an automobile accident and Williams was declared ineligible, Kabealo cemented himself as Ohio State's starting left halfback heading into the 1937 season. It was also reported that he would be the team's probable punter. Howard Wedebrook was noted as team's best punter but not good enough all-around to take Kabealo's starting left halfback job. In September 1937, the Dayton Daily News said Kabealo would serve as the "key man" for Ohio State that year. Kabealo played both left halfback and quarterback for Ohio State during the 1937 season. On October 23 against Northwestern, he made a punt that went out of bounds at the one-yard line, helping clinch the victory for Ohio State. The 1937 Buckeyes finished the year with a 6–2 record, a No. 13 ranking in the AP poll, and second place in the Big Ten Conference.

Kabealo split time between left halfback and quarterback again in 1938, and was co-captain of the team (along with Carl Kaplanoff). Kabealo was the final of four brothers to have played football for Ohio State. The Capital Times also stated that the Kabealos were the best football family in the Big Ten, "although three short of the Crowe brothers of Notre Dame." Throughout the 1938 season, Kabealo shared time with Don Scott and Jim Sexton. However, when the going was rough or Ohio State was within striking distance of the end zone, Kabealo was usually in the lineup "calling plays and making the tough runs". The 1938 Buckeyes finished the year unranked with a 4–3–1 record, and fifth place in the Big Ten. While at Ohio State, Kabealo studied at the College of Commerce and Journalism. He graduated from Ohio State in 1940.

== Professional career ==
On January 2, 1939, Kabealo played in the inaugural Blue–Gray Football Classic, a college football all-star game. He was the game's leading rusher, carrying the ball 10 times for 56 yards. He also punted twice. Kabealo declined an invitation to play in the 1939 Chicago Charities College All-Star Game to instead play for the Hawaiian Polar Bears of the Hawaii Football Association. Kabealo began the 1939 season as the starting quarterback for the Polar Bears, but had become a backup by November.

After over five years away from football, Kabealo signed with the Cleveland Rams of the National Football League on July 29, 1944. Little was expected of him, but he had stayed in good shape and eventually earned a starting role for the Rams. He played both offense and defensive halfback for Cleveland. On November 9, 1944, the Cleveland Press noted that a pass from Kabealo to right end Al Gutknecht would be "written into the records as that of the most amazing aerial combination in all footballdom". Kabealo and Gutknecht were both blind in one eye. However, Gutknecht did not end up catching a pass for the Rams. Kabealo played in all ten games, starting seven, for the Rams during the 1944 season. He totaled 47 carries for 152 yards and one touchdown, two receptions for 20 yards, two interceptions for nine yards, four kick returns for 126 yards, and seven punt returns for 64 yards. He also completed his only pass attempt for 54 yards and a touchdown. The Rams finished the year with a 4–6 record. Kabealo became a free agent after the 1944 season. In May 1945, it was reported that he had become a calculating machine distributor in Columbus, Ohio.

== Personal life ==
In 1947, Kabealo became the manager of the Dayton, Ohio, branch of the Marchant Calculating Machine Company. He previously worked with his brother John in the company's Columbus branch. Kabealo was later a prominent realtor in Dayton, retiring with the Keyes Gateway company. He spent time as the president of the Montgomery County Chapter of the OSU Alumni Association, and the vice president of the Dayton Area Board of Realtors. He was also one of the first inductees into the Chaney High School Hall of Fame.

Kabealo lived in Dayton since World War II. He died on September 24, 1993, at Kettering Hospital in Kettering, Ohio.
