= A. J. Jones =

American football player (born 1959)

A.J. Jones
No. 24, 34
- Position: Running back

Personal information
- Born: May 30, 1959 (age 67); Youngstown, Ohio, U.S.
- Listed height: 6 ft 1 in (1.85 m)
- Listed weight: 202 lb (92 kg)

Career information
- High school: North (Youngstown)
- College: Texas
- NFL draft: 1982: 8th round, 202nd overall pick

Career history
- Los Angeles Rams (1982–1985); Detroit Lions (1985)

Career NFL statistics
- Rushing yards: 2
- Rushing average: 2
- Stats at Pro Football Reference

Anthony Levine "Jam" Jones (born May 30, 1959) is an American former professional football player who was a running back in the National Football League (NFL) for the Los Angeles Rams and Detroit Lions. He played college football for the Texas Longhorns from 1979 to 1982. Jones was selected by the Rams in the eighth round of the 1982 NFL draft.

== College career ==
Jones followed Earl Campbell as the starting running back for the Longhorns and in his first season led the Southwest Conference in Touchdowns. He led the team in rushing and several other statistical categories for all four years and finished as the 4th most productive running back in school history at the time. In his final game, he helped the Longhorns upset #3 Alabama in the 1982 Cotton Bowl.

== Professional career ==
Jones was selected 202nd overall by the Rams in the eighth round of the 1982 NFL draft. His only carries for the Rams came in a 51-7 playoff loss to the Washington Redskins in 1984. In 1985 Rams starter Eric Dickerson was a holdout and Jones saw more playing time in the preseason, scoring two TD's against the St. Louis Cardinals, but midway through the season, he was signed as a free agent by the Detroit Lions where he played in 8 games almost exclusively as a Kickoff Returner, but he also carried the ball once for two yards. He was waived by the Lions prior to the 1986 season.
