= East High School (Youngstown, Ohio) =

Location
- 474 Bennington Avenue; Youngstown, Ohio 44505; United States
- Coordinates: 41°06′10″N 80°37′16″W

Information
- Type: Public, Coeducational high school
- Established: 1925
- Closed: 2026
- School district: Youngstown City School District
- Superintendent: Justin Jennings
- CEEB code: 366180
- NCES School ID: 390451602082
- Principal: Debra Campbell
- Teaching staff: 31.00 (on an FTE basis)
- Grades: 7-12
- Enrollment: 575 (2023–2024)
- Student to teacher ratio: 18.55
- Campus type: Small City
- Colors: Navy and Gold
- Athletics conference: Steel Valley Conference
- Team name: Golden Bears
- Website: east.ycsd.org

East High School was a public high school in Youngstown, Ohio, United States. Part of the Youngstown City School District, it was first established in 1925 and closed in 1998; it was reopened in 2007 and was consolidated into Youngstown High School in 2026. Athletic teams were known as the Golden Bears in the Ohio High School Athletic Association. The consolidated Youngstown High School is located at the former East High School campus on Bennington Avenue.

== History ==
The original East High School was open from 1925 to 1998, when it was converted to a middle school. The middle school closed following the 2006 winter quarter. A new building reopened as a high school in 2007, following the closing and consolidation of Rayen High School and Woodrow Wilson High School.

Youngstown Easts mascot were originally known as the Sunrisers from 1925–49 and was changed to the Golden Bears in 1950. When East reopened in 2007, they were known as the Panthers until their former mascot was resurrected in 2017.

East High School closed following the 2025-2026 school year, merging with Chaney High School. The new high school will be occupied in the same building as East.

== Athletics ==
State championships

- Boys golf - 1952

== Notable alumni ==
- Bob Commings - former college football coach
- John S. Jackson - former politician
- Ken Smith - former professional baseball player in the Major League Baseball (MLB)
- Paul Toth - former professional baseball player in the Major League Baseball (MLB)
