= Harvey Jones =

American football player (1921–1998)

No. 11
- Position: Halfback / Defensive back

Personal information
- Born: April 15, 1921; Beaumont, Texas, U.S.
- Died: December 13, 1998 (aged 77); Shreveport, Louisiana, U.S.
- Listed height: 6 ft 0 in (1.83 m)
- Listed weight: 175 lb (79 kg)

Career information
- High school: Beaumont (TX)
- College: Baylor

Career history
- Cleveland Rams (1944–1945); Washington Redskins (1947)

Awards and highlights
- NFL champion (1945)
- Stats at Pro Football Reference

Harvey Mabry Jones (April 15, 1921 – December 13, 1998) was an American football halfback and defensive back in the National Football League (NFL) for the Cleveland Rams and the Washington Redskins. He played college football at Baylor University.
