= Boyd Clay =

American football player (1915–1978)

No. 21, 43
- Position: Tackle

Personal information
- Born: May 6, 1915; Hohenwald, Tennessee, U.S.
- Died: June 22, 1978 (aged 63); Mount Juliet, Tennessee, U.S.
- Listed height: 6 ft 1 in (1.85 m)
- Listed weight: 220 lb (100 kg)

Career information
- High school: Hermitage (TN) DuPont
- College: Tennessee
- NFL draft: 1940: 11th round, 95th overall pick

Career history
- Cleveland Rams (1940–1944)

Career NFL statistics
- Games played: 34
- Stats at Pro Football Reference

Boyd Davis Clay (May 6, 1915 – June 22, 1978) was an American professional football tackle. He played for the Cleveland Rams from 1940 to 1944. He was drafted by the Cleveland Rams in the 11th round of the 1940 NFL draft with the 95th overall pick. He was named as one of the Nashville's Next 50 Greatest High School Football Players of All-Time.
