= Woodrow Wilson High School (Youngstown, Ohio) =

Location
- 2725 Gibson Street; Youngstown, Ohio 44502; United States

Information
- Type: Public, Coeducational high school
- Established: 1936
- Closed: 2007
- School district: Youngstown City School District
- Grades: 9-12
- Colors: Red and White
- Song: Wilson High, We Love You Dearly
- Fight song: Across the Field
- Athletics conference: Youngstown City Series; Steel Valley Conference
- Team name: Redmen ("Presidents" until 1962)
- Yearbook: Orion

Woodrow Wilson High School was one of six traditional public high schools in Youngstown, Ohio and was a part of the Youngstown City School District system. It was closed in 2007, with the opening of the new East High School. The former school building was razed in the winter of 2008.

== History ==
Woodrow Wilson High School was located at the corner of Gibson and Indianola, on Youngstown's south side. Wilson opened in 1928 as a junior high school. In 1936, Wilson became a high school in response to overcrowding at nearby South High School. Sixty-nine classes graduated from Wilson, the first in 1939, the last in 2007. The school was expanded in 1939, to accommodate vocational and arts programming.

On May 26, 2007, more than 2,000 alumni of Wilson High School participated in a final tour of the building. Many alumni brought along children and grandchildren and shared their memories of the school.

== Athletics ==
The Wilson mascot and its sports teams were known as the Presidents and then changed to the Redmen. There was no on-campus football stadium. South high School Stadium was the home of the Wilson football teams. The school colors were red and white. The Alma Mater was "Wilson High, We Love You Dearly" and the fight song was sung to the tune of the Ohio State University's "Across the Field". The yearbook was named, the Orion.
