= Youngstown City School District =

School district in Ohio, United States

- East High School in 2007

Location
- 20 West Wood Street; Youngstown, Ohio 44503; United States

Information
- Type: Public
- Established: 1925
- NCES District ID: 3904516
- Teaching staff: 306.00 (on an FTE basis)
- Grades: PK-12
- Enrollment: 4,570 (2024-25)
- Student to teacher ratio: 14.93
- Website: www.ycsd.org

Youngstown City School District is a public school system headquartered in Youngstown, Ohio, United States. It oversees one public high school, two vocational high schools, two junior high schools and nine elementary schools across the city of Youngstown.

== History ==
The Youngstown City School District formed in the early 20th century, with several high schools being built between the late 1860s through the late 1930s, including Rayen, Chaney, Woodrow Wilson and South High Schools.

Due to declining enrollment, Youngstown shuttered several long-time high schools, such as North in 1980, South in 1993 and the original East High School in 1998. It was used as a middle school until 2006. The following year saw both Wilson High School and Rayen High School closing, and the construction and reopening of the new East High School.

In 2011, Chaney High School was repurposed from a traditional public high school to a performing arts and STEM academy, as part of a district restructuring. Chaney's sports programs were suspended as well. In the 2017-18 school year, Chaney returned as a public high school, reinstating athletics and its regular curriculum.

All Youngstown public schools previously mandated that students wore uniforms. However, in 2016, former district CEO Krish Mohip retracted such requirement.

In June 2025, the Youngstown City School District announced it would be undergoing a two-phase district reconfiguration plan, which would be consolidating the two public high schools in the school district Chaney and East beginning the 2026-27 school year, along with both the middle schools. The new name for the high school was announced as "Youngstown Unified High School," but was later changed to just Youngstown High School. Students will be housed at the East High School building. The Youngstown City School District announced future plans to renovate the East High School building in March 2026, as part of a $3 million renovation plan.

== Schools ==
=== High schools ===
- Choffin Career and Technical Center
- Youngstown High School
- Youngstown Rayen Early College High School

=== Middle schools ===
- Rayen Early College Middle School
- Youngstown Middle School

=== Elementary schools ===
- Harding Elementary
- Kirkmere Elementary
- Martin Luther King Elementary
- Paul C. Bunn Elementary
- Taft Elementary
- Volney Rogers Elementary
- William Holmes McGuffey Elementary
- Williamson Elementary
- Wilson Elementary

=== Former high schools ===
- Chaney High School was shuttered at the end of the 2025–2026 school year and consolidated into Youngstown High School.
- East High School was shuttered at the end of the 2025–2026 school year and consolidated into Youngstown High School. The original East High School building was shuttered at the end of the 1997–1998 school year due to declining enrollment, and a new East High School opened on the same property in 2007.
- North High School (known as Scienceville High School until 1945) was shuttered at the end of the 1979–1980 school year due to declining enrollment.
- Rayen High School was shuttered at the end of the 2006–2007 school year with the opening of East High School. The building has since been demolished.
- South High School was shuttered at the end of the 1992–1993 school year due to declining enrollment. This building has since been sold and is now a charter school.
- Woodrow Wilson High School was shuttered at the end of the 2006–2007 school year with the opening of East High School. The building has since been demolished.
