= John Karrs =

American football player (1915–1999)

No. 35
- Position: Quarterback

Personal information
- Born: September 19, 1915; Pittsburgh, Pennsylvania, U.S.
- Died: November 27, 1999 (aged 84)
- Listed height: 6 ft 1 in (1.85 m)
- Listed weight: 210 lb (95 kg)

Career information
- High school: Arnold High
- College: Duquesne

Career history
- Cleveland Rams (1944–1945); Pittsburgh Steelers (1945)*
- * Offseason or practice squad member only

Career statistics
- Passing attempts: 10
- Passing completions: 4
- Completion percentage: 40.0%
- TD–INT: 0–4
- Passing yards: 49
- Passer rating: 16.2
- Stats at Pro Football Reference

John Bernard Karrs (September 19, 1915 – November 27, 1999) was an American professional football player who was a quarterback for the Cleveland Rams of the National Football League (NFL). He played college football for the Duquesne Dukes.

He was also one of the first left-handed quarterbacks in the history of the NFL.

== Coaching career ==
Karrs was a sports coach for several high school teams. He was primarily a coach at New Kenn High for years. In 1944, he was going to accept a new job at Waynesboro High School but ended up backing out shortly after and remaining a coach at Kenn High. However, he was on the hot seat and had an option to either coach at Kenn High, or play a season with the Cleveland Rams. He ended up choosing to play with the Rams and was no longer a coach at Kenn High.

== Professional career ==
Despite not playing football for six seasons prior, Karrs signed with the Cleveland Rams in 1944. Playing in all ten games of the season and starting in eight, he threw four completions for 49 yards with a 23-yard pass being his longest of the season. He also rushed seven times for 0 total yards with his longest run being 3 yards.

Karrs was still on the Rams in the 1945 offseason but got involved in a 2-for-1 trade that put him on the Pittsburgh Steelers two weeks before the preseason began. He did not play an NFL game with the Steelers.
