= Al Gutknecht =

American football player (1917–1996)

No. 2, 25
- Position: Guard

Personal information
- Born: June 11, 1917; Arnold, Pennsylvania, U.S.
- Died: March 25, 1996 (aged 78); Springdale, Pennsylvania, U.S.
- Listed height: 6 ft 0 in (1.83 m)
- Listed weight: 205 lb (93 kg)

Career information
- College: Niagara

Career history
- Brooklyn Dodgers (1943); Cleveland Rams (1944)

Albert Rudolph "Dutch" Gutknecht (June 11, 1917 – March 25, 1996) was an American professional football player in the National Football League (NFL), at the guard position, for the Brooklyn Dodgers in 1943 and the Cleveland Rams in 1944. He played college football at Niagara University prior to going professional.
