= Fakhir Brown =

American football player (born 1977)

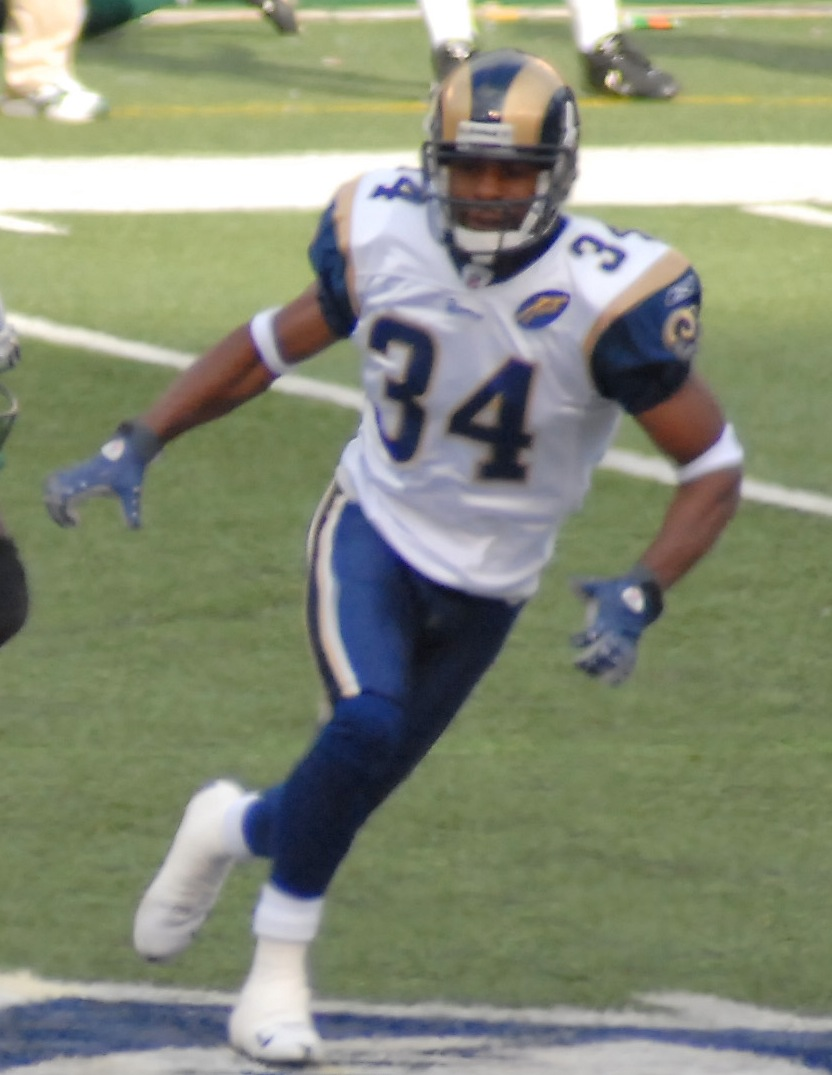
- Brown with the St. Louis Rams in 2008

No. 24, 35, 34
- Position: Cornerback

Personal information
- Born: September 21, 1977 (age 49); Detroit, Michigan, U.S.
- Listed height: 5 ft 11 in (1.80 m)
- Listed weight: 192 lb (87 kg)

Career information
- High school: Mansfield (LA)
- College: Grambling State
- NFL draft: 1999: undrafted

Career history
- Toronto Argonauts (1998); San Diego Chargers (1999–2000); Oakland Raiders (2002)*; New Orleans Saints (2002–2005); St. Louis Rams (2006–2008); Florida Tuskers (2009–2010)
- * Offseason or practice squad member only

Career NFL statistics
- Total tackles: 372
- Sacks: 2
- Forced fumbles: 7
- Pass deflections: 76
- Interceptions: 11
- Defensive touchdowns: 1
- Stats at Pro Football Reference

Fakhir Hamin Brown (born September 21, 1977) is an American former professional football player who was a cornerback in the National Football League (NFL) and Canadian Football League (CFL). He was signed by the Toronto Argonauts as an undrafted free agent in 1998. He played college football for the Grambling State Tigers.

Brown was also a member of the San Diego Chargers, Oakland Raiders, New Orleans Saints, St. Louis Rams, and Florida Tuskers.

== College career ==
Brown played his college football at Grambling State University. He finished his career with 68 tackles and six interceptions. He was a drafting and design major.

== Professional career ==
=== Toronto Argonauts ===
After not getting drafted in the 1998 NFL draft Brown signed with the Toronto Argonauts, where he played in six games, making 13 tackles and one interception.

=== San Diego Chargers ===
Brown spent the first three weeks of the 1999 season on the San Diego Chargers practice squad.

On October 23, 1999, he was signed to the active roster. He played in nine games with three starts, recording 30 tackles and forced a fumble.

In 2000, he started eight of nine games, recording 35 tackles and an interception. He missed seven games with shoulder injury. In his two seasons with the Chargers he started 11 of 18 games recording 65 tackles and one interception.

=== Oakland Raiders ===
Before the 2002 season Brown signed with the Oakland Raiders, but was released before the season.

=== New Orleans Saints ===
On July 15, 2002, Brown signed a two-year $825,000 contract with the New Orleans Saints. During his first year with the team in 2002 he played 12 games, made 20 tackles, and deflected 5 passes.

In 2003, he played all 16 games while recording 34 tackles.

On March 4, 2004, he was re-signed to a two-year $1.45 million contract. In 2004 Brown started 10 of 16 games in which he played. He made 54 tackles, two interceptions, two forced fumbles, and three fumble recoveries.

In 2005, Brown started four of 12 games in which he played, recording 34 tackles. In his four seasons with the Saints, he started 14 of 56 games in which he played while recording 142 tackles and two interceptions.

=== St. Louis Rams ===
On March 14, 2006, Brown signed a five-year, $12 million contract with the St. Louis Rams. In 2006, he started all 14 games he played in, recording 66 tackles, one sack, three interceptions, and two forced fumbles.

Before the 2007 season he was suspended for the first four games of the season for violating the NFL's substance abuse policy. After returning he started the last 12 games, recording 47 tackles, four interceptions, and one touchdown return.

On September 24, 2008, Brown was released by the Rams. Brown had been playing through a partially torn rotator cuff when he was cut. On October 13, 2008, they re-signed him after Ricky Manning, Jr. was placed on injured reserve. He finished the season starting 11 of 13 games he played in recording 45 tackles, one sack, one interception, and a forced fumble.

=== Florida Tuskers ===
Brown was signed by the Florida Tuskers of the United Football League on September 26, 2009.
