= List of NFL players (L) =

This is a list of players who have appeared in at least one regular season or postseason game in the National Football League (NFL), American Football League (AFL), or All-America Football Conference (AAFC) and have a last name that starts with "L". This list is accurate through the end of the 2025 NFL season.

== Laa–Lan ==
- Galen Laack
- Eric Laakso
- Paul Laaveg
- Sandy LaBeaux
- Mike Labinjo
- Tony LaBissoniere
- Matt LaBounty
- Travis LaBoy
- Ryan LaCasse
- Bob Lacey
- Deon Lacey
- Jacob Lacey
- Steve Lach
- Sean LaChapelle
- Jim Lachey
- Corbin Lacina
- Rick Lackman
- Matt LaCosse
- Dave LaCrosse
- Chris Lacy
- Eddie Lacy
- Ken Lacy
- Tyler Lacy
- Anthony Ladd
- Ernie Ladd
- Jim Ladd
- Kenny Ladler
- L. P. Ladouceur
- Wally Ladrow
- Tiny Ladson
- Doc LaDuron
- Pete Ladygo
- Dave Lafary
- Tron LaFavor
- Brandon LaFell
- Bill LaFitte
- Bill LaFleur
- David LaFleur
- Greg LaFleur
- Joe LaFleur
- Dick Lage
- Jeff Lageman
- Chet Lagod
- Morris LaGrand
- Hal Lahar
- Pat Lahey
- Mike LaHood
- Warren Lahr
- Scott Laidlaw
- Aaron Laing
- Porter Lainhart
- Bruce Laird
- Jim Laird
- Patrick Laird
- Bill Lajousky
- Antwan Lake
- Carnell Lake
- Quentin Lake
- Roland Lakes
- Bob Lally
- Roger LaLonde
- Niko Lalos
- Pete Lamana
- Jason Lamar
- Kevin Lamar
- Joe Lamas
- Brad Lamb
- CeeDee Lamb
- Mack Lamb
- Roddy Lamb
- Ron Lamb
- Walt Lamb
- Curly Lambeau
- DaVonte Lambert
- Dion Lambert
- Frank Lambert
- Gordon Lambert
- Jack Lambert
- Keenan Lambert
- KeAndre Lambert-Smith
- Pat Lamberti
- Josh Lambo
- Mike Lambrecht
- Kendall Lamm
- Buck Lamme
- Chris Lammons
- Pete Lammons
- Daryle Lamonica
- Noel Lamontagne
- Forrest Lamp
- Cam Lampkin
- Jake Lampman
- Chuck Lamson
- Emmanuel Lamur
- Tyler Lancaster
- Trey Lance
- Dan Land
- Fred Land
- Isaiah Land
- Mel Land
- Lowell Lander
- Walt Landers
- Sean Landeta
- Nathan Landman
- Kevin Landolt
- Derek Landri
- Jim Landrigan
- Chris Landrum
- Mike Landrum
- Dawan Landry
- Greg Landry
- Harold Landry
- Jarvis Landry
- LaRon Landry
- Tom Landry
- Mort Landsberg
- Bob Landsee
- Austen Lane
- Bobby Lane
- Clayton Lane
- Eric Lane (born 1959)
- Eric Lane (born 1974)
- Fred Lane
- Garcia Lane
- Gary Lane
- Jaylin Lane
- Jeremy Lane
- Jorvorskie Lane
- Les Lane
- Lew Lane
- MacArthur Lane
- Max Lane
- Night Train Lane
- Oxie Lane
- Rayuan Lane III
- Skip Lane
- Brandon Lang
- Chick Lang
- David Lang
- Gene Lang
- Izzy Lang
- Kenard Lang
- Le-Lo Lang
- T. J. Lang
- Bob Langas
- Bill Lange
- Jim Langer
- Jeremy Langford
- Jevon Langford
- Kendall Langford
- Reshard Langford
- Antonio Langham
- Irv Langhoff
- Reggie Langhorne
- Harvey Langi
- Brendan Langley
- Charlie Lanham
- Anthony Lanier
- Ken Lanier
- Willie Lanier
- Jim Lankas
- Paul Lankford
- Ellis Lankster
- Spencer Lanning
- Dan Lanphear
- Danny Lansanah
- Grenny Lansdell
- Buck Lansford
- Jim Lansford
- Mike Lansford
- Mose Lantz
- Jake Lanum
- Chuck Lanza

== Lap–Laz ==
- Bill Lapham
- Dave Lapham
- Myron Lapka
- Ted Lapka
- Ron LaPointe
- Phil LaPorta
- Sam LaPorta
- Benny LaPresta
- Bob Laraba
- Jack Laraway
- Steve Largent
- Austin Larkin
- Eric Larkin
- Gordon Laro
- Joey LaRocque
- Paul LaRosa
- Dan LaRose
- Carl Larpenter
- Kareem Larrimore
- Jack Larscheid
- Gary Larsen
- Leif Olve Dolonen Larsen
- Spencer Larsen
- Ted Larsen
- Tyler Larsen
- Bill Larson (born 1938)
- Bill Larson (born 1953)
- Greg Larson
- Kurt Larson
- Kyle Larson
- Louie Larson
- Lynn Larson
- Ojay Larson
- Paul Larson
- Pete Larson
- Swede Larson
- Gage Larvadain
- Yale Lary
- John Lascari
- Daniel Lasco
- Jim Lash
- Tim Lashar
- Paul Lasike
- Greg Lasker
- Bill Laskey
- Frank Lasky
- Jim Laslavic
- Nick Lassa
- Lou Lassahn
- Dick Lasse
- Derrick Lassic
- Ike Lassiter
- Kamari Lassiter
- Kwamie Lassiter
- Kwamie Lassiter II
- Art Laster
- Don Laster
- Darius Latham
- JC Latham
- Greg Lathan
- Lamar Lathon
- Kit Lathrop
- Al Latimer
- Cody Latimer
- Don Latimer
- Jerry Latin
- Tony Latone
- Chuck Latourette
- Billy Latsko
- Greg Latta
- Brian Lattimore
- Cedrick Lattimore
- DeDe Lattimore
- Jamari Lattimore
- Marshon Lattimore
- Johnny Lattner
- Cameron Latu
- Keleki Latu
- Laiatu Latu
- Paul Latzke
- Dylan Laube
- Dutch Lauer
- Larry Lauer
- Pete Lauer
- Babe Laufenberg
- Bud Laughlin
- Jim Laughlin
- Jim Laughton
- Kyle Lauletta
- Jonah Laulu
- Sataoa Laumea
- Hank Lauricella
- Francis Laurinaitis
- James Laurinaitis
- Lindy Lauro
- Lance Laury
- Shawn Lauvao
- Ted Laux
- Chad Lavalais
- Al Lavan
- Dante Lavelli
- Joe Lavender
- Robert Lavette
- Paul Lavine
- Cordarro Law
- Dennis Law
- Hubbard Law
- John Law
- Ty Law
- Al Lawler
- Justin Lawler
- Burton Lawless
- Amos Lawrence
- Ben Lawrence
- Cameron Lawrence
- DeMarcus Lawrence
- Devaroe Lawrence
- Dexter Lawrence
- Don Lawrence
- Ed Lawrence
- Henry Lawrence
- Jimmy Lawrence
- Kent Lawrence
- Larry Lawrence
- Marcus Lawrence
- Matt Lawrence
- Quinten Lawrence
- Rashard Lawrence
- Reggie Lawrence
- Rolland Lawrence
- Trevor Lawrence
- Nate Lawrie
- Joe Laws
- Trevor Laws
- Al Lawson
- Carl Lawson
- Gerard Lawson
- Jamie Lawson
- Jerry Lawson
- Jim Lawson
- Manny Lawson
- Nevin Lawson
- Odell Lawson
- Roger Lawson
- Shaq Lawson
- Steve Lawson
- Luke Lawton
- Russ Lay
- Bob Layden
- Pete Layden
- Jason Layman
- Bobby Layne
- George Layne
- Justin Layne
- Raheem Layne
- John Layport
- Allen Lazard
- Bill Lazetich
- Mike Lazetich
- Pete Lazetich

== Lea–Len ==
- Paul Lea
- Bill Leach
- Mike Leach
- Scott Leach
- Vonta Leach
- Gar Leaf
- Ryan Leaf
- Bernie Leahy
- Bob Leahy
- Jerry Leahy
- Pat Leahy
- Javon Leake
- John Leake
- Roosevelt Leaks
- DeMarvin Leal
- Wes Leaper
- Les Lear
- Ronald Leary
- Tom Leary
- Wesley Leasy
- Paul Leatherman
- Milton Leathers
- Alex Leatherwood
- Allan Leavitt
- Dallin Leavitt
- Frank Leavitt
- Eddie LeBaron
- Dick LeBeau
- Harper LeBel
- Fungy Lebengood
- Ben Leber
- Bob Leberman
- Bob LeBlanc
- Clarence LeBlanc
- Cre'Von LeBlanc
- Michael LeBlanc
- Shane Lechler
- Ed Lechner
- Roy Lechthaler
- Nick Leckey
- Bill Leckonby
- Jim LeClair (born 1944)
- Jim LeClair (born 1950)
- Roger LeClerc
- Terry LeCount
- Richard LeCounte
- Jim Lecture
- Doc Ledbetter
- Jeremiah Ledbetter
- Jonathan Ledbetter
- Monte Ledbetter
- Toy Ledbetter
- Dwayne Ledford
- Courtney Ledyard
- Hal Ledyard
- Amp Lee
- Andy Lee
- Bernie Lee
- Biff Lee
- Bill Lee
- Bivian Lee
- Bob Lee (born 1935)
- Bob Lee (born 1946)
- Bobby Lee
- Byron Lee
- Cameron Lee
- Carl Lee
- Charles Lee
- Danzell Lee
- Darron Lee
- David Lee
- Delphfrine Lee
- Donald Lee
- Dwight Lee
- Edward Lee
- Elijah Lee
- Eric Lee
- Gary Lee
- Gene Lee
- Greg Lee
- Herman Lee
- Jack Lee
- Jacky Lee
- James Lee (born 1980)
- James Lee (born 1985)
- Jeff Lee
- John Lee (born 1953)
- John Lee (born 1964)
- Keith Lee
- Ken Lee
- Kevin Lee
- Khari Lee
- Larry Lee
- Lloyd Lee
- Logan Lee
- Mark Lee
- Marqise Lee
- Marquel Lee
- Matt Lee
- Mike Lee
- Monte Lee
- Oudious Lee
- Pat Lee
- ReShard Lee
- Ricky Lee
- Ron Lee
- Ronnie Lee
- Sean Lee
- Shawn Lee
- Vershon Lee
- Willie Lee
- Zeph Lee
- Tuffy Leemans
- Max Leetzow
- Dick Leeuwenburg
- Jay Leeuwenburg
- Billy Lefear
- Gil LeFebvre
- Joe Lefeged
- Clyde LeForce
- Dick Leftridge
- Byron Leftwich
- Burnie Legette
- Tyrone Legette
- Xavier Legette
- Brad Leggett
- Dave Leggett
- Earl Leggett
- Jordan Leggett
- Maurice Leggett
- Scott Leggett
- John Leglue
- Lance LeGree
- Doug Legursky
- Michael Lehan
- Teddy Lehman
- Matt Lehr
- Chris Lehrer
- Jake Leicht
- Jeff Leiding
- Brian Leigeb
- Charles Leigh
- Dutch Leighty
- Tony Leiker
- Matt Leinart
- Rube Leisk
- Rodney Leisle
- Al Leith
- Norman LeJeune
- Walt LeJeune
- Brad Lekkerkerker
- Cory Lekkerkerker
- Ashley Lelie
- Tim Lelito
- Frank LeMaster
- Ray Lemek
- Shane Lemieux
- Bruce Lemmerman
- Jim LeMoine
- Cleo Lemon
- Cliff Lemon
- Mike Lemon
- Orie Lemon
- Corey Lemonier
- Jessie Lemonier
- Devin Lemons
- George Lenc
- Matt Lengel
- Bill Lenkaitis
- Reid Lennan
- Charles Leno
- Deommodore Lenoir
- Lance Lenoir
- Paris Lenon
- Greg Lens
- Vince Lensing
- Jack Lentz
- Pesky Lentz

== Leo–Ley ==
- Bobby Leo
- Chuck Leo
- Jim Leo
- Titus Leo
- Tony Leon
- Bill Leonard
- Brian Leonard
- Cecil Leonard
- Deane Leonard
- Jim Leonard (born 1899)
- Jim Leonard (born 1910)
- Jim Leonard (born 1957)
- John Leonard
- Louis Leonard
- Matt Leonard
- Rick Leonard
- Riley Leonard
- Shaquille Leonard
- Tony Leonard
- Bob Leonetti
- Jim Leonhard
- Brian Leonhardt
- Bobby Leopold
- Eku Leota
- Barney Lepper
- Matt Lepsis
- Josh LeRibeus
- Emarlos Leroy
- Jimmy Lesane
- Ron Leshinski
- Mikel Leshoure
- Jordan Leslie
- Darrell Lester (born 1914)
- Darrell Lester (born 1940)
- Keith Lester
- Pinky Lester
- Robert Lester
- Tim Lester
- Jeremy LeSueur
- Zebbie Lethridge
- Russ Letlow
- Cotton Letner
- John Letsinger
- Leon Lett
- Steve Levanitis
- Lou Levanti
- Jack LeVeck
- Dwayne Levels
- Dave Levenick
- Dorsey Levens
- Mike Levenseller
- Nick Leverett
- Otis Leverette
- KT Leveston
- Jim Levey
- Jerry LeVias
- Corey Levin
- Anthony Levine
- Bashir Levingston
- Lazarius Levingston
- Will Levis
- Andy Levitre
- Chad Levitt
- Mark LeVoir
- Chuck Levy
- DeAndre Levy
- Harvey Levy
- Len Levy
- Taylor Lewan
- Verne Lewellen
- Albert Lewis
- Alex Lewis (born 1981)
- Alex Lewis (born 1992)
- Art Lewis (born 1891)
- Art Lewis (born 1911)
- Bill Lewis (born ?)
- Bill Lewis (born 1963)
- Cam Lewis
- Chad Lewis
- Cliff Lewis (born 1923)
- Cliff Lewis (born 1959)
- D. D. Lewis (born 1945)
- D. D. Lewis (born 1979)
- Damien Lewis
- Damione Lewis
- Dan Lewis
- Darren Lewis
- Darryl Lewis
- Darryll Lewis
- Dave Lewis (born 1945)
- Dave Lewis (born 1954)
- David Lewis
- Derrick Lewis
- Dezmin Lewis
- Dion Lewis
- Eddie Lewis
- Ernie Lewis
- Frank Lewis
- Franklin Lewis
- Garry Lewis
- Gary Lewis (born 1942)
- Gary Lewis (born 1958)
- Gary Lewis (born 1961)
- Greg Lewis (born 1969)
- Greg Lewis (born 1980)
- Hal Lewis (born 1935)
- Hal Lewis (born 1944)
- Henry Lewis
- Jamal Lewis
- Jeff Lewis
- Jermaine Lewis
- Jess Lewis
- Joe Lewis
- John Lewis
- Jonas Lewis
- Jonathan Lewis
- Jourdan Lewis
- Keenan Lewis
- Keith Lewis
- Kendrick Lewis
- Kenny Lewis
- Kevin Lewis (born 1966)
- Kevin Lewis (born 1978)
- Lance Lewis
- LaTroy Lewis
- Leo Lewis
- LeQuan Lewis
- Mac Lewis
- Marcedes Lewis
- Mark Lewis
- Marvin Lewis
- Michael Lewis (born 1971)
- Michael Lewis (born 1980)
- Mike Lewis
- Mo Lewis
- Myron Lewis
- Nate Lewis
- Patrick Lewis
- Ray Lewis
- Reggie Lewis (born 1954)
- Reggie Lewis (born 1956)
- Rich Lewis
- Roderick Lewis
- Rodney Lewis
- Roger Lewis
- Ron Lewis (born 1968)
- Ron Lewis (born 1972)
- Ronnell Lewis
- Roy Lewis
- Ryan Lewis
- Sherman Lewis
- Sid Lewis
- Stan Lewis
- Tahaun Lewis
- Terrell Lewis
- Terry Lewis
- Thad Lewis
- Thomas Lewis
- Tim Lewis
- Tiny Lewis
- Tommylee Lewis
- Travis Lewis
- Trey Lewis
- Tyquan Lewis
- Vernon Lewis
- Will Lewis
- Woodley Lewis
- Chris Lewis-Harris
- Kapron Lewis-Moore
- Tex Leyendecker
- John Leypoldt
- Victor Leyva

== Li–Ll ==
- Kory Lichtensteiger
- Dennis Lick
- Cully Lidberg
- Brody Liddiard
- Dave Liddick
- Frank Liebel
- Todd Liebenstein
- Don Lieberum
- Michael Liedtke
- Bob Liggett
- Alex Light
- Matt Light
- Isaiah Likely
- Alva Liles
- Sonny Liles
- George Lilja
- Ryan Lilja
- Joe Lillard
- Bob Lilly
- Kevin Lilly
- Sammy Lilly
- Tony Lilly
- Verl Lillywhite
- Garrett Limbrick
- Beaux Limmer
- Dave Lince
- Jeremy Lincoln
- Keith Lincoln
- Mike Lind
- Joe Lindahl
- Rian Lindell
- Errol Linden
- Cody Lindenberg
- Brandon Linder
- Tyler Linderbaum
- Ryan Lindley
- Trevard Lindley
- Luke Lindon
- Al Lindow
- Paul Lindquist
- Everett Lindsay
- Phillip Lindsay
- Dale Lindsey
- Hub Lindsey
- Jim Lindsey
- Menz Lindsey
- Steve Lindsey
- Vic Lindskog
- Alec Lindstrom
- Chris Lindstrom (born 1960)
- Chris Lindstrom (born 1997)
- Dave Lindstrom
- Bill Line
- Zach Line
- Bob Lingenfelter
- Goran Lingmerth
- Adam Lingner
- Chim Lingrel
- Toni Linhart
- Jack Lininger
- Jeff Linkenbach
- Jack Linn
- Frank Linnan
- Aubrey Linne
- Larry Linne
- Chris Linnin
- Corey Linsley
- Jonathan Linton
- Joe Lintzenich
- Augie Lio
- Jim Lipinski
- Ronnie Lippett
- Tony Lippett
- Louis Lipps
- Gene Lipscomb
- Paul Lipscomb
- John Lipski
- Don Lisbon
- Rusty Lisch
- Tony Liscio
- Pete Liske
- Sean Lissemore
- Paul Liston
- Ed Listopad
- Greg Liter
- Red Litkus
- Cam Little
- David Little (born 1959)
- David Little (born 1961)
- Earl Little
- Everett Little
- Floyd Little
- George Little
- Greg Little (born 1989)
- Greg Little (born 1997)
- Jack Little
- Jim Little
- John Little
- Larry Little
- Leonard Little
- Lou Little
- Steve Little
- Walker Little
- Joe Little Twig
- Carl Littlefield
- Cory Littleton
- Jody Littleton
- Marist Liufau
- Corey Liuget
- Mickey Livers
- Virgil Livers
- Nate Livings
- Andy Livingston
- Bruce Livingston
- Cliff Livingston
- Dale Livingston
- Howie Livingston
- Mike Livingston
- Ted Livingston
- Walt Livingston
- Warren Livingston
- Bob Livingstone
- Chris Liwienski
- Brandon Lloyd
- Dan Lloyd
- Dave Lloyd
- Devin Lloyd
- Doug Lloyd
- Greg Lloyd, Jr.
- Greg Lloyd, Sr.
- Jeff Lloyd
- MarShawn Lloyd
- Rhys Lloyd

== Loa–Lou ==
- Phil Loadholt
- Bill Lobenstein
- Greg Loberg
- Drew Lock
- Jeff Locke
- P.J. Locke
- Jake Locker
- Bret Lockett
- Charles Lockett
- Danny Lockett
- Frank Lockett
- J. W. Lockett
- Kevin Lockett
- Tyler Lockett
- Wade Lockett
- Ricardo Lockette
- Carl "Spider" Lockhart
- Eugene Lockhart
- Sean Locklear
- Michael Lockley
- Billy Ray Locklin
- Kerry Locklin
- Scott Lockwood
- Mike Lodish
- Cullen Loeffler
- Dick Loepfe
- Chuck Loewen
- Mitchell Loewen
- Curtis Lofton
- James Lofton
- Oscar Lofton
- Steve Lofton
- Andy Logan
- Bennie Logan
- Chuck Logan
- Dave Logan
- David Logan
- Dick Logan
- Ernie Logan
- James Logan
- Jerry Logan
- Jim Logan
- Marc Logan
- Mike Logan
- Obert Logan
- Randy Logan
- Stefan Logan
- T.J. Logan
- Bob Logel
- Zion Logue
- John Lohmeyer
- Chip Lohmiller
- Joe Lokanc
- Derek Lokey
- Slick Lollar
- Al Lolotai
- Tony Lomack
- John Lomakoski
- Mark Lomas
- Tom Lomasney
- Neil Lomax
- Antonio London
- Brandon London
- Drake London
- LaCale London
- Mike London
- Tom London
- Frank Lone Star
- Ted Lone Wolf
- Keith Loneker
- Bill Long
- Bob Long (born 1922)
- Bob Long (born 1934)
- Bob Long (born 1942)
- Buford Long
- Carson Long
- Charlie Long
- Chris Long
- Chuck Long
- Darren Long
- Dave Long
- David Long
- David Long Jr.
- Doug Long
- Harvey Long
- Howie Long
- Hunter Long
- Jake Long
- Jerome Long
- Johnny Long
- Ken Long
- Kevin Long (born 1955)
- Kevin Long (born 1975)
- Khari Long
- Kyle Long
- Lance Long
- Louie Long
- Matt Long
- Mel Long
- Mike Long
- Rien Long
- Spencer Long
- Terry Long
- Tim Long
- Tom Long
- Ty Long
- Steve Longa
- Matt Longacre
- Ken Longenecker
- Clint Longley
- Sam Longmire
- Tom Longo
- Roy Longstreet
- Paul Longua
- Ryan Longwell
- Dean Look
- John Lookabaugh
- Dane Looker
- Ace Loomis
- Don Looney
- James Looney
- Jim Looney
- Joe Looney
- Joe Don Looney
- Tyler Loop
- Bill Lopasky
- Daniel Loper
- Roy Lopez
- Tom Lopienski
- Karl Lorch
- Jack Lord
- Jammal Lord
- Jared Lorenzen
- Tony Lorick
- Erik Lorig
- Jack Losch
- J. P. Losman
- Craig Loston
- Ed Lothamer
- Billy Lothridge
- Andre Lott
- Anthone Lott
- Billy Lott
- Edson Lott
- John Lott
- Ronnie Lott
- Thomas Lott
- John Lotulelei
- Star Lotulelei
- Ron Lou
- Fletcher Louallen
- Corey Louchiey
- Alvin Loucks
- Ed Loucks
- Kamil Loud
- Rommie Loudd
- Tom Louderback
- Isaiahh Loudermilk
- Lamar Louis
- Lance Louis
- Ricardo Louis
- Al Louis-Jean
- Angelo Loukas

== Lov–Ly ==
- Rick Lovato
- Clarence Love
- Duval Love
- John Love
- Jordan Love
- Julian Love
- Kyle Love
- Mike Love
- Randy Love
- Sean Love
- Terry Love
- Walt Love
- Calvin Loveall
- Edwin Lovelady
- Josh Lovelady
- Colston Loveland
- Fritz Loven
- David Loverne
- John LoVetere
- Dominic Lovett
- John Lovett
- Derek Loville
- Warren Loving
- Frank LoVuolo
- Kirk Lowdermilk
- Bull Lowe
- Gary Lowe
- Lloyd Lowe
- Omare Lowe
- Paul Lowe
- Reggie Lowe
- Vederian Lowe
- Walter Lowe
- Woodrow Lowe
- Darby Lowery
- Dwight Lowery
- Hugh Lowery
- Michael Lowery
- Nick Lowery
- Reuben Lowery
- Calvin Lowry
- Dean Lowry
- Orlando Lowry
- Quentin Lowry
- Jackie Lowther
- Alex Loyd
- Jeremy Loyd
- Mike Loyd
- Shalom Luani
- Steve Lubischer
- Lou Lubratovich
- Abraham Lucas
- Al Lucas
- Chad Lucas
- Chase Lucas
- Cornelius Lucas
- Dick Lucas
- Jeff Lucas
- Jordan Lucas
- Justin Lucas
- Ken Lucas
- Ray Lucas
- Richie Lucas
- Tim Lucas
- Mike Lucci
- Derrel Luce
- Lew Luce
- John Lucente
- Nick Luchey
- Corey Luciano
- Wayne Lucier
- Andrew Luck
- Oliver Luck
- Terry Luck
- Mick Luckhurst
- Sid Luckman
- Bill Lucky
- Mike Lucky
- Bill Lueck
- Hunter Luepke
- Don Luft
- Nolan Luhn
- Jonathan Luigs
- Johnny Lujack
- Cole Luke
- Steve Luke
- Tommy Luke
- Triandos Luke
- Tom Luken
- Jim Lukens
- Jesse Luketa
- Jack Lummus
- Father Lumpkin
- Joey Lumpkin
- Kregg Lumpkin
- Ricky Lumpkin
- Ron Lumpkin
- Sean Lumpkin
- Bobby Luna
- Dave Lunceford
- Bill Lund
- Kayo Lunday
- Brad Lundblade
- Bob Lundell
- Chase Lundt
- Dennis Lundy
- Lamar Lundy
- Wali Lundy
- Charlie Lungren
- Mel Lunsford
- Jerry Lunz
- Ladue Lurth
- Bob Lurtsema
- Vaughn Lusby
- Jim Luscinski
- Mike Lush
- Bob Lusk
- Henry Lusk
- Herb Lusk
- Booth Lusteg
- Darrell Luter
- Ed Luther
- Jake Luton
- Scott Lutrus
- Deuce Lutui
- Dave Lutz
- Wil Lutz
- Frankie Luvu
- Bralyn Lux
- Chris Luzar
- Allen Lyday
- Todd Lyght
- Dewey Lyle
- Garry Lyle
- Keith Lyle
- Rick Lyle
- Lenny Lyles
- Lester Lyles
- Robert Lyles
- Del Lyman
- Dustin Lyman
- Jeff Lyman
- Link Lyman
- Aaron Lynch
- Ben Lynch
- Blake Lynch
- Cameron Lynch
- Carl Lynch
- Corey Lynch
- Dick Lynch
- Eddie Lynch
- Eric Lynch
- Fran Lynch
- James Lynch (born 1982)
- James Lynch (born 1999)
- Jim Lynch
- John Lynch
- Lorenzo Lynch
- Lynn Lynch
- Marshawn Lynch
- Paul Lynch
- Paxton Lynch
- Shawn Lynch
- Tom Lynch
- Anthony Lynn
- Johnnie Lynn
- Babe Lyon
- Billy Lyon
- Dicky Lyons
- John Lyons
- Lamar Lyons
- Marty Lyons
- Mitch Lyons
- Pratt Lyons
- Robert Lyons
- Tommy Lyons
- Matt Lytle
- Rob Lytle
