= 1960 Boston Patriots season =

Season of American Football League team the Boston Patriots

- Owner: Billy Sullivan
- General manager: Edward McKeever
- Head coach: Lou Saban
- Home stadium: Boston University Field

Results
- Record: 5–9
- Division place: 4th AFL Eastern
- Playoffs: Did not qualify
- AFL All-Stars: None

Uniform

The 1960 Boston Patriots season was the franchise's first season in the new American Football League. Led by head coach Lou Saban, the Patriots finished with five wins and nine losses, last in the AFL's Eastern Division. The team played their home games at Boston University Field (formerly the site of the Boston Braves' home ballpark Braves Field), later named "Nickerson Field."

== Staff ==
1960 Boston Patriots staff
Front office: President – Billy Sullivan; General manager – Edward McKeever; Head coaches: Head coach – Lou Saban; Offensive coaches: Offensive backfield – Mike Holovak; Offensive line – Red Miller	Defensive coaches: Defensive line – Jerry Smith; Defensive backfield – Joe Collier

== Season summary ==
In 1960, the inaugural season of the American Football League, the Patriots played in several important "firsts". The first-ever AFL pre-season game was played on the road against the Buffalo Bills on Saturday night, July 30, which Boston won. They hosted the inaugural regular season game, a Friday night 13–10 loss to the Denver Broncos at Boston University Field on September 9. The playing field was aligned along the first-base line. The Patriots started the season at 2–2, then lost three straight and won three straight in the middle of a five-game home stand to get back to .500 at 5–5, then ended the season on a four-game slide. They finished at 5–9, last in the AFL's Eastern Division, and second-worst in the eight-team league, ahead of Denver.

Butch Songin was the leading passer and Alan Miller was the leading rusher. Gino Cappelletti was a defensive back and placekicker the first year. Just before the final game, a receiver was slow getting back to the huddle, so Cappelletti filled in. He was impressive, and was a receiver for the rest of his career.

== Season results ==
Week	Date	Opponent	Result	Record	Venue	Attendance	Game Recap
1	September 9	Denver Broncos	**L** 10–13	0–1	Boston University Field	21,597	Recap
2	September 17	at **New York Titans**	**W** 28–24	1–1	Polo Grounds	19,200	Recap
3	September 23	**Buffalo Bills**	**L** 0–13	1–2	Boston University Field	20,732	Recap
4	Bye						
5	October 8	at Los Angeles Chargers	**W** 35–0	2–2	L.A. Memorial Coliseum	18,226	Recap
6	October 16	at Oakland Raiders	**L** 14–27	2–3	Kezar Stadium	11,500	Recap
7	October 23	at Denver Broncos	**L** 24–31	2–4	Bears Stadium	12,683	Recap
8	October 28	Los Angeles Chargers	**L** 16–45	2–5	Boston University Field	13,988	Recap
9	November 4	Oakland Raiders	**W** 34–28	3–5	Boston University Field	8,446	Recap
10	November 11	**New York Titans**	**W** 38–21	4–5	Boston University Field	11,653	Recap
11	November 18	Dallas Texans	**W** 42–14	5–5	Boston University Field	14,721	Recap
12	November 25	**Houston Oilers**	**L** 10–24	5–6	Boston University Field	27,123	Recap
13	December 4	at **Buffalo Bills**	**L** 14–38	5–7	War Memorial Stadium	14,335	Recap
14	December 11	at Dallas Texans	**L** 0–34	5–8	Cotton Bowl	12,000	Recap
15	December 18	at **Houston Oilers**	**L** 21–37	5–9	Jeppesen Stadium	22,352	Recap
Note: Intra-division opponents are in **bold** text.

Game 1: The Patriots lost to the Broncos 13–10 in the AFL season opener on Friday night. The Patriots struck first, with a 34-yard field goal in the first quarter. On the first play of the second quarter, Denver receiver Al Carmichael caught a pass in the flats and scampered 41 yards for a touchdown. In the third quarter, Bronco Gene Mingo took a punt 76 yards for a touchdown. Later in the quarter Patriot receiver Jim Colclough lost a fumble on the Denver 38. However, two plays later, Patriot defensive back Chuck Shonta took an interception 60 yards to the Denver 10, setting up a 10-yard touchdown pass from Butch Songin to Colclough in the right side of the end zone. In the fourth quarter, the Patriots seemed to be on a game-winning drive until an interception at the Denver two-yard line. The Broncos then ran sixteen plays to run out the clock.

Game 2: The Patriots won a thriller at the Polo Grounds against the Titans, 28–24. The Patriots dug themselves into a hole, down 24 to 7 in the fourth quarter. They were down 24–21 on the last play of the game. The center, Mike Hudock, gave a low snap to the Titans punter, who fumbled and Patriot Chuck Shonta picked it up and raced 52 yards for the game-winning score.

Game 3: The Patriots were shut out 13–0 against the Bills, the highlight being a 58-yard touchdown pass from Tommy O'Connell to Carl Smith.

Game 4: The Patriots won their first decisive win of the season against the Chargers in Los Angeles. It began with an 11-play drive capped by a Gino Cappelletti field goal. On the following kickoff, Charger Don Norton fumbled, leading to a quick touchdown for Boston. The Patriots followed it up with a 19-yard touchdown pass. On the next drive, Jim Crawford scored a touchdown, set up by a 78-yard Billy Wells reception. A Harry Jacobs interception set up a Wells touchdown, and another Boston field goal wrapped up the day, as the Patriots rolled over the Chargers 35–0.

Game 5: The Patriots, after their terrific win over the Chargers, were given a rude awakening in Oakland. On just the third play of game, Jack Larscheid scored on an 87-yard run, and the Patriots never regained the lead. The Raiders quickly built up a 27–14 lead with 11:45 left to go in the first quarter. However, the Patriots twice drove deep into Oakland territory, both times winding up with Butch Songin throwing interceptions. The Patriots were sloppy throughout the game, with multiple unnecessary penalties and turnovers.

Game 6: The Patriots dropped a game that should have been theirs. Early in the third quarter, the Patriots led 24–0. Boston had dominated, with three Songin touchdown passes and a field goal. The Broncos were down but not out, and rallied back to stun the Patriots. In the last quarter and a half, the Broncos scored 31 unanswered points to win the game. Broncos quarterback Frank Tripucka lead the way, completing four touchdown passes to three different receivers. The game is still one of the largest deficits that a Patriot opponent has come back from to win.

Game 7: After an embarrassing loss several weeks before, the Chargers had revenge on their minds. They got it. The Chargers won the game by the time the first half arrived. When Paul Maguire fell on a fumble in the end zone early in the third quarter, they matched the 35-point lead the Patriots had in the previous game. Despite the Patriots' two following touchdowns, the Chargers ran over the Patriots 45–16.

Game 8: The Patriots faced the Raiders in a must-win game. The Patriots dominated throughout three quarters, aided by three Songin passing touchdowns. Boston held a 31 to 14 lead entering the fourth quarter, and seemed to be on the verge of their third win of season. The Raiders tried to pull off a similar comeback that the Broncos had two games earlier. The Raiders scored twice on running plays, and were soon driving for the game winning score. The Patriots managed to avoid a loss or tie, intercepting future Patriot quarterback Babe Parilli with just under two minutes to go. The Patriots had won just their third game of the season and their first on their home field. The game is noteworthy for having the lowest attendance of any regular season game in Patriots history at only 8,446.

Game 12: The Patriots hosted the Houston Oilers in what would be the first sellout game in American Football League history.

== Standings ==
AFL Eastern Division
	W	L	T	PCT	DIV	PF	PA	STK
Houston Oilers	10	4	0	.714	5–1	379	285	W2
New York Titans	7	7	0	.500	2–4	382	399	L1
Buffalo Bills	5	8	1	.385	3–3	296	303	L2
Boston Patriots	5	9	0	.357	2–4	286	349	L4

Note: Tie games were not officially counted in the standings in the AFL.

== Roster ==
All of the following players appeared in at least one game for the 1960 Boston Patriots.

Number	Name	Position	Notes
53	Tom Addison	LB	
85	Jack Atchason	E	
26	Walter Beach	DB/RB	
52	Phil Bennett	LB	
34	Joe Biscaha	E	
54	Bill E. Brown	LB	
33	Fred Bruney	DB	
22	Ron Burton	HB	
20	Gino Cappelletti	WR/K/DB	Number 20 retired by the Patriots
23	Richard Christy	HB	
23	Abe Cohen	G	
81	Jim Colclough	WR	
30	Jim Crawford	FB/HB	
77	Bobby Cross	T/DT	
34	Jake Crouthamel	HB	
72	Al Crow	DT	
56	Walt Cudzik	C/LB	
77	Bill Danenhauer	DE	
62	Jack Davis	G	
89	Bob Dee	DE/DT	Number 89 retired by the Patriots
74	Jerry DeLucca	T/DT	
15	Tom Dimitroff	QB	
76	Tony Discenzo	T	
40	Larry Garron	HB	
45	Jerry Green	E	
14	Tom Greene	QB/P	
67	Art Hauser	T/G	
79	Jim Lee Hunt	DT/DE	Number 79 retired by the Patriots
83	Harry Jacobs	LB/DE	
73	Harry Jagielski	DT/T	
24	Joe Johnson	HB/E/WR	
34	Bill Larson	FB	
60	Bob Lee	G	
63	Chuck Leo	G	
24	Walt Livingston	HB	
86	Oscar Lofton	E	
87	Mike Long	E	
85	Don McComb	DE	
75	George McGee	T	
32	Alan Miller	FB	
25	Ross O'Hanley	DB	
79	Al Richardson	DE	
80	Jack Rudolph	LB	
64	Tony Sardisco	G/LB	
44	Gerhard Schwedes	HB	
34	Chuck Shonta	DB	
70	Hal Smith	DT	
42	Bob Soltis	DB	
11	Butch Songin	QB	
45	Thomas Stephens	TE/DB	
72	Bill Striegel	G/T/LB	
22	Clyde Washington	DB/P	
41	Billy Wells	HB	
10	Harvey White	QB	

=== Starters ===
The following players started the most games at their respective positions:

Pos	Offense	Pos	Defense	Pos	Special teams
QB	Butch Songin	LDE	Bob Dee	K	Gino Cappelletti
HB	Richard Christy	LDT	Harry Jagielski	P	Tom Greene
FB	Alan Miller	RDT	Hal Smith	PR	Billy Wells
FL	Jim Colclough	RDE	Tony Sardisco	KR	Dick Christy
SE	Oscar Lofton	LOLB	Tom Addison		
TE	Thomas Stephens	MLB	Bill E. Brown		
LT	George McGee	ROLB	Jack Rudolph		
LG	Charley Leo	LCB	Clyde Washington		
C	Walt Cudzik	RCB	Gino Cappelletti		
RG	Jack Davis	LS	Fred Bruney		
RT	Jerry DeLucca	RS	Ross O'Hanley		
