= List of Boston University Terriers in the NFL draft =

This is a list of Boston University Terriers football players in the NFL draft.

== Key ==
B	Back	K	Kicker	NT	Nose tackle
C	Center	LB	Linebacker	FB	Fullback
DB	Defensive back	P	Punter	HB	Halfback
DE	Defensive end	QB	Quarterback	WR	Wide receiver
DT	Defensive tackle	RB	Running back	G	Guard
E	End	T	Offensive tackle	TE	Tight end

== Selections ==
Year	Round	Pick	Overall	Player	Team	Position
1938	3	10	25	Gary Famiglietti	Chicago Bears	B
1946	26	2	242	Gordon Botsford	Boston Yanks	E
1946	32	3	298	Larry Kirkman	Philadelphia Eagles	B
1948	13	1	106	Bob Hatch	New York Giants	B
1949	15	3	144	George Ramacorti	Boston Yanks	G
1950	23	4	291	Irv Heller	Detroit Lions	T
1950	29	10	375	Bob Whelan	San Francisco 49ers	B
1951	3	5	31	George Sulima	Pittsburgh Steelers	E
1951	8	10	96	Hugo Primiani	Los Angeles Rams	T
1951	19	7	226	Bill Pavlikowski	Pittsburgh Steelers	B
1952	1	12	12	Harry Agganis	Cleveland Browns	QB
1952	9	10	107	John Kastan	New York Giants	B
1952	26	10	311	Tom Lavery	New York Giants	E
1953	20	2	231	Len D'Errico	Chicago Cardinals	G
1954	26	5	306	Lou Petroka	Chicago Bears	B
1955	10	11	120	Tom Gastall	Detroit Lions	B
1955	29	4	341	Sam Pino	Green Bay Packers	B
1956	9	5	102	Johnny Bredice	Philadelphia Eagles	e
1957	23	1	266	Lou Lovely	Philadelphia Eagles	G
1959	7	9	81	Jim Kenney	Washington Redskins	E
1960	19	3	219	Gene Prebola	Detroit Lions	E
1961	19	13	135	Bob Minihane	Cleveland Browns	G
1962	9	1	113	Dave Viti	Washington Redskins	E
1964	12	14	168	Bob Horton	Chicago Bears	RB
1967	17	21	440	Bobby Nichols	Boston Patriots	TE
1968	12	21	321	Wilson Whitty	Dallas Cowboys	LB
1968	13	15	342	John Gallagher	New York Giants	DE
1968	16	17	425	Dick Farley	San Diego Chargers	DB
1970	1	17	17	Bruce Taylor	San Francisco 49ers	DB
1970	8	11	193	Fred Barry	Kansas City Chiefs	DB
1970	9	13	221	Pat Hughes	New York Giants	C
1971	9	14	144	Jay Dixon	Cleveland Browns	DE
1972	9	6	214	Floyd Priester	Denver Broncos	DB
1973	11	26	286	Chris Kete	Miami Dolphins	C
1977	6	7	146	Dave Lindstrom	San Diego Chargers	DE
1980	8	10	203	Sam Stepney	Kansas City Chiefs	LB
1981	11	15	291	Jim Jensen	Miami Dolphins	QB
1982	8	10	205	Chris Lindstrom	St. Louis Cardinals	DT
1982	9	6	229	Bob Speight	Los Angeles Rams	T
1983	12	9	316	Paul Farren	Cleveland Browns	T
1985	11	15	295	Paul Lewis	New England Patriots	RB
1986	4	4	86	Bill Brooks	Indianapolis Colts	WR
1986	5	14	124	Gary Walker	Indianapolis Colts	C
1989	7	20	187	Mike Graybill	Cleveland Browns	T
1990	9	12	232	Darvell Huffman	Indianapolis Colts	WR
