= 2017 NFL season =

American football season

Regular season
- Duration: September 7, 2017 – December 31, 2017

Playoffs
- Start date: January 6, 2018
- AFC Champions: New England Patriots
- NFC Champions: Philadelphia Eagles

Super Bowl LII
- Date: February 4, 2018
- Site: U.S. Bank Stadium, Minneapolis, Minnesota
- Champions: Philadelphia Eagles

Pro Bowl
- Date: January 28, 2018
- Site: Camping World Stadium, Orlando, Florida

AFC teams: West, North, South, East
NFC teams: West, North, South, East

The 2017 NFL season was the 98th season in the history of the National Football League (NFL) and the 52nd of the Super Bowl era. The season began on September 7, 2017, with the Kansas City Chiefs defeating the defending Super Bowl LI champion New England Patriots in the NFL Kickoff Game. The season concluded with Super Bowl LII, in which the National Football Conference (NFC) champion Philadelphia Eagles defeated the American Football Conference (AFC) champion New England Patriots 41–33 to win their first Super Bowl title, and fourth NFL championship, in franchise history, and making the NFC East the first and currently only division where every team has won a Super Bowl.

For the second time since the league expanded to a 16-game season, a team finished winless in a full season, as Cleveland lost all 16 of their games this season. The last team to do so was the 2008 Detroit Lions.

For the second consecutive year, a team relocated to the Los Angeles metropolitan area, as the former San Diego Chargers announced their intent to do so in January 2017. This was the first time that the Los Angeles metropolitan area had two teams since 1994.

== Player movement ==
The 2017 NFL League year began on March 9 at 4:00 p.m. ET. On March 7, clubs were allowed to contact and enter into contract negotiations with the agents of players who became unrestricted free agents upon the expiration of their contracts two days later. On March 9, clubs exercised options for 2017 on players who have option clauses in their contracts, submitted qualifying offers to their restricted free agents with expiring contracts and to those who desire to retain a Right of Refusal/Compensation, submitted a Minimum Salary Tender to retain exclusive negotiating rights to their players with expiring 2016 contracts and who have fewer than three accrued seasons of free agent credit, and teams were required to be under the salary cap using the "Top-51" definition (in which the 51 highest paid-players on the team's payroll must have a collected salary cap hit below the actual cap). The 2017 trading period also began the same day.

This season's salary cap increased to $167 million per team, up from $155.27 million in 2016.

=== Free agency ===
A total of 496 players were eligible for some form of free agency at the beginning of the free agency period. Notable players to change teams via free agency included:

- Quarterbacks Jay Cutler (Chicago to Miami), Brock Osweiler (Houston to Cleveland)
- Running backs Jamaal Charles (Kansas City to Denver), Eddie Lacy (Green Bay to Seattle), Latavius Murray (Oakland to Minnesota), Adrian Peterson (Minnesota to New Orleans), and Mike Tolbert (Carolina to Buffalo)
- Wide receivers Kenny Britt (Los Angeles Rams to Cleveland), Pierre Garçon (Washington to San Francisco), DeSean Jackson (Washington to Tampa Bay), Alshon Jeffery (Chicago to Philadelphia), Brandon Marshall (New York Jets to New York Giants), Terrelle Pryor (Cleveland to Washington), Torrey Smith (San Francisco to Philadelphia), and Robert Woods (Buffalo to Los Angeles Rams),
- Tight ends Martellus Bennett (New England to Green Bay) and Jared Cook (Green Bay to Oakland);
- Offensive linemen Kelvin Beachum (Jacksonville to New York Jets), Matt Kalil (Minnesota to Carolina), T. J. Lang (Green Bay to Detroit), Ronald Leary (Dallas to Denver), Russell Okung (Denver to Los Angeles Chargers), Riley Reiff (Detroit to Minnesota), Mike Remmers (Carolina to Minnesota), Ricky Wagner (Baltimore to Detroit), Larry Warford (Detroit to New Orleans), Andrew Whitworth (Cincinnati to Los Angeles Rams), and Kevin Zeitler (Cincinnati to Cleveland).
- Defensive linemen Calais Campbell (Arizona to Jacksonville) and Johnathan Hankins (New York Giants to Indianapolis)
- Linebackers Jabaal Sheard (New England to Indianapolis), Malcolm Smith (Oakland to San Francisco), and Manti Te'o (Los Angeles Chargers to New Orleans)
- Defensive backs A. J. Bouye (Houston to Jacksonville), Barry Church (Dallas to Jacksonville), Johnathan Cyprien (Jacksonville to Tennessee), Stephon Gilmore (Buffalo to New England), Micah Hyde (Green Bay to Buffalo), Tony Jefferson (Arizona to Baltimore), and Logan Ryan (New England to Tennessee),

=== Trades ===
The following notable trades were made during the 2017 league year:

- March 9: Jacksonville traded TE Julius Thomas to Miami in exchange for a 2017 seventh-round pick.
- March 9: Miami traded T Branden Albert to Jacksonville in exchange for a 2018 seventh-round pick.
- March 9: Houston traded QB Brock Osweiler, a 2018 second-round pick, and a 2017 sixth-round pick to Cleveland in exchange for a 2017 fourth-round pick.
- March 9: Indianapolis traded TE Dwayne Allen and a 2017 sixth-round pick to New England in exchange for a 2017 fourth-round pick.
- March 10: New Orleans traded WR Brandin Cooks and a 2017 fourth-round pick to New England in exchange for 2017 first and third-round picks.
- March 10: Carolina traded DE Kony Ealy and 2017 a third-round pick to New England in exchange for a 2017 second-round pick.
- March 15: Baltimore traded C Jeremy Zuttah and a 2017 sixth-round pick to San Francisco for a 2017 sixth-round pick.
- April 4: Baltimore traded DT Timmy Jernigan and a 2017 third-round draft pick to Philadelphia in exchange for a 2017 third-round draft pick.
- April 26: Seattle traded the contract rights of previously retired RB Marshawn Lynch and a 2018 sixth-round pick to Oakland for a 2018 fifth-round pick.
- August 11: Buffalo traded WR Sammy Watkins and a 2018 sixth-round draft pick to the Los Angeles Rams for CB E. J. Gaines and a 2018 second-round pick. That same day, the Bills traded cornerback Ronald Darby to the Philadelphia Eagles for wide receiver Jordan Matthews and a 2018 third-round draft pick.

=== Notable retirements ===
- OT Ryan Clady: Four-time Pro Bowler, three-time All-Pro (two first-team, one second-team), and Super Bowl 50 champion. Played for Denver and the New York Jets during his nine-year career.
- WR Andre Johnson: Seven-time Pro Bowler and four-time All-Pro (two first-team, two second-team). Played for the Houston, Indianapolis, and Tennessee during his 14-year career.
- T Jake Long: Four-time Pro Bowler, two-time All-Pro (one first-team, one second-team), and first overall pick of the 2008 NFL draft. Played for Miami, the St. Louis Rams, Atlanta, and Minnesota during his nine-year career.
- LB Robert Mathis: Five-time Pro Bowler, two-time All Pro (one first-team, one second-team), and Super Bowl XLI champion. Played for Indianapolis during his entire 14-year career.
- QB Tony Romo: Four-time Pro Bowler and one-time second-team All-Pro. Played for Dallas during his entire 14-year career.
- WR Steve Smith Sr.: Five-time Pro Bowler and three-time All Pro (two first-team, one second-team). Played for Carolina and Baltimore during his 16-year career.
- QB Michael Vick: Four-time Pro Bowler, first overall pick of the 2001 NFL draft, and 2010 Comeback Player of the Year. Played for Atlanta, Philadelphia, the New York Jets, and Pittsburgh during his 13-year career.
- LB DeMarcus Ware: Nine-time Pro Bowler, seven-time All-Pro (four first-team, three second-team), and Super Bowl 50 champion. Played for Dallas and Denver during his 12-year career.
- WR Roddy White: Four-time Pro Bowler and one-time first-team All-Pro. Played for Atlanta during his entire 11-year career.
- DT Vince Wilfork: Five-time Pro Bowler, four-time All-Pro (one first-team, three second-team), and two-time Super Bowl champion (XXXIX and XLIX). Played for New England and Houston during his 13-year career.

==== Others ====
- Branden Albert
- Anquan Boldin
- David Bruton
- Reggie Bush
- Jordan Cameron
- Chris Chester
- Joshua Cribbs
- King Dunlap
- Brandon Flowers
- Justin Forsett
- Doug Free
- Chad Greenway
- Percy Harvin
- A. J. Hawk
- Andrew Hawkins
- Rashad Jennings
- Jacoby Jones
- James Jones
- Terrance Knighton
- James Laurinaitis
- Kory Lichtensteiger
- Darren McFadden
- Lance Moore
- Rob Ninkovich
- Zachary Orr
- Jerraud Powers
- Geoff Schwartz
- Josh Scobee
- Stephen Tulloch
- John Urschel
- Sebastian Vollmer

=== Draft ===
The 2017 NFL draft was held on April 27–29 in Philadelphia. The Cleveland Browns selected Myles Garrett with the first overall pick.

== Officiating changes ==
Alberto Riveron replaced Dean Blandino as the league's Vice President of Officiating; Blandino was hired by Fox Sports as a rule analyst.

The following officials were hired:

- Brian Bolinger (Line Judge)
- Mark Butterworth (Replay Official)
- Mike Carr (Down Judge)
- Mike Chase (Replay Official)
- Ryan Dickson (Field Judge)
- John McGrath (moved from field to Replay Official)
- Jimmy Oldham (Replay Official)
- David Oliver (Line Judge)
- Mearl Robinson (Field Judge)
- Brad Rogers (Field Judge)
- Danny Short (Line Judge)
- Steve Woods (Umpire)

== Rule changes ==
The following rule changes were approved for the 2017 NFL season at the owners' meeting on March 28, 2017:

- Defensive players are now prohibited from running toward the line of scrimmage and leaping or hurdling over offensive linemen on field goal or PAT attempts, similar to a change made in college football for the 2017 season. Previously this action was permitted as long as the leaper or hurdler did not land on other players.
- Include in the definition of a "defenseless player" receivers tracking the quarterback or looking back for the ball, including inside the legal contact (5 yards from the line of scrimmage) zone.
- Egregious hits to the head (similar to the "targeting" rule in NCAA football) will cause the player to risk immediate disqualification.
- The replay control center will make the final ruling on reviewed plays instead of the game referee, although the referee can still provide input on reviewable plays.
- The sideline replay monitor (the "hood") will be eliminated and replaced with a tablet on the field for the referee to review with the replay control center.
- Crackback blocks are now prohibited by a backfield player in motion, even if he is not more than two yards outside the tackle box when the ball is snapped.
- Make permanent the rule that players who commit two certain types of unsportsmanlike conduct penalties (throwing punches/forearms/kicking, even if they do not connect, directing abusive, threatening, or insulting language toward opponents, teammates, game officials or league officials, and using baiting or taunting acts or words that may engender ill will between teams) in the same game risk automatic disqualification.
- Extend for a second season the change in the touchback spot after a kickoff or safety free kick to the 25-yard line.
- Make illegal actions that would conserve time penalized by the option for a 10-second runoff inside of the two-minute warning of each half or overtime (previously this only applied in the final minute of each half or overtime).
- The 10-second runoff rule for replay reversals applies after the two-minute warning instead of the last minute of the half.
- If a team commits multiple fouls on the same down with the intent of manipulating the game clock, the team will be penalized 15 yards for unsportsmanlike conduct and the game clock will be reset. This change was made in response to both the San Francisco 49ers and the Baltimore Ravens employing this strategy by intentionally holding the defensive players to allow the game clock to run down or run out (in the case of the Ravens' game vs. the Cincinnati Bengals) during the previous season.
- In response to the move of Sarah Thomas from line judge to head linesman for the 2017 season, the NFL renamed the officiating position of the head linesman to "down judge".

The following rule changes were approved for the 2017 NFL season at the NFL Spring League meeting on May 23, 2017:

- Overtime has been shortened from 15 minutes to 10 minutes for preseason (thru 2019; no exhibition season in the next) and regular season games. Playoff games will continue to have 15 minutes for overtime periods.
- Restrictions on celebrations have been relaxed, removing penalties for group celebrations, going to the ground to celebrate, or using the ball as a prop.
- Teams can bring two players back from injured reserve instead of one.
- Teams can now cut their preseason rosters from 90 players to 53 on one day, removing the deadline to get the roster down to 75 players before the final preseason game.
- Teams will not be required to give candidates for general manager final say over the 53-man roster.

The ban on teams contacting potential coaching candidates until that candidate's team has been eliminated from the playoffs was tabled.

== 2017 deaths ==
The following people associated with the NFL (or AFL) died in 2017.

=== Members of the Pro Football Hall of Fame ===
Cortez Kennedy
Kennedy, a defensive tackle who spent 11 years with the Seattle Seahawks from 1990 to 2000 and had his number 96 retired by the organization, was a member of the Hall of Fame's class of 2012. He died May 23 at the age of 48, from suspected cardiac problems.
Yale Lary
The special teams standout and defensive back played 11 nonconsecutive seasons for the Detroit Lions from 1952 to 1964, winning three championships, and was a member of the Hall's class of 1979. He died May 11 at the age of 86.
Dan Rooney
was chairman and plurality owner of the Pittsburgh Steelers and one of the sons of founding owner Art Rooney, Sr. Having been officially involved with the franchise since 1960, Rooney was a part of all six of the Steelers' Super Bowl victories. In addition to this, Rooney was considered an active and progressive owner in the league's operations, most famously by successfully pushing for the Rooney Rule, an affirmative action policy requiring all NFL franchises to interview persons of color for head coaching vacancies. Concurrently with his role with the Steelers, Rooney also served as United States Ambassador to Ireland from 2009 to 2014. He was inducted into the Pro Football Hall of Fame in 2000, making him and his father the second father-son duo in the Hall behind Tim and Wellington Mara (to whom the Rooneys are related by marriage). Rooney died on April 13 at the age of 84.
Y. A. Tittle
Tittle, a quarterback, spent 16 seasons in professional football, two in the All-America Football Conference and 14 in the NFL. He played for the Baltimore (Green) Colts, San Francisco 49ers (as a member of the Million Dollar Backfield) and New York Giants throughout his career. He set several passing records during his time in the NFL and is credited for inventing the alley-oop. He was never able to win a league championship despite three consecutive appearances in the game for the Giants, who retired his number 14. He was a member of the Hall's class of 1971. Tittle died October 8 at the age of 90 from complications due to dementia.

=== Others ===
- Dave Adolph
- Bill Anderson
- Pervis Atkins
- Ron Billingsley
- Dave Brazil
- Kevin Cadle
- Bernie Casey
- Bill Cox
- Dick Enberg
- Bill Fischer
- Terry Glenn
- Tom Graham
- Larry Grantham
- Ralph Guglielmi
- James Hadnot
- James Hardy III
- Larry Hayes
- Mitchell Henry
- Aaron Hernandez
- Larry Hickman
- John Hilton
- Claude Hipps
- Michael Jackson
- Edwin Jackson
- Derrick Jensen
- Ken Kranz
- Bob Lee
- Tony Liscio
- Eddie Macon
- George Maderos
- Mickey Marvin
- Clay Matthews Sr.
- Ron Meyer
- Red Miller
- Paul Mitchell
- David Modell
- Tom Modrak
- Rod Monroe
- Quentin Moses
- Leonard Myers
- Tommy Neck
- Tommy Nobis
- Babe Parilli
- Benny Perrin
- Hugh Pitts
- Sonny Randle
- Len Rohde
- Max Runager
- Daniel Te'o-Nesheim
- John Thierry
- Jimmy Thomas
- Ted Topor
- Rick Tuten
- Wayne Walker
- Clarence Williams
- Ellery Williams

== Preseason ==
Training camps for the 2017 season were held in late July through August. Teams started training camp no earlier than 15 days before the team's first scheduled preseason game.

Prior to the start of the regular season, each team played four preseason exhibition games, beginning on August 10. The preseason began on August 3, with the 2017 Pro Football Hall of Fame Game between the Dallas Cowboys (represented in the 2017 Hall of Fame Class by owner Jerry Jones) and the Arizona Cardinals (represented by quarterback Kurt Warner). It was televised nationally on NBC. The preseason schedule ended on August 31; one preseason game between the Dallas Cowboys and Houston Texans, was canceled in the aftermath of Hurricane Harvey.

== Regular season ==
The 2017 regular season's 256 games were played over a 17-week schedule which began on September 7. Each of the league's 32 teams plays a 16-game schedule, with one bye week for each team. The slate also features games on Monday nights. There are games played on Thursday, including the National Football League Kickoff game in prime time on September 7 and games on Thanksgiving Day. The regular season concluded with a full slate of 16 games on Sunday, December 31, all of which were the intra–division matchups, as it has been since 2010.

Scheduling formula

Under the NFL's current scheduling formula, each team plays the other three teams in its own division twice. In addition a team plays against all four teams in one other division from each conference. The final two games on a team's schedule are against the two teams in the team's own conference in the divisions the team was not set to play which finished the previous season in the same rank in their division (e.g. the team which finished first in its division the previous season would play each other team in its conference that also finished first in its respective division). The preset division pairings for 2017 will be as follows.

Intra-conference
AFC East vs AFC West
AFC North vs AFC South
NFC East vs NFC West
NFC North vs NFC South

Inter-conference
AFC East vs NFC South
AFC North vs NFC North
AFC South vs NFC West
AFC West vs NFC East

Highlights of the 2017 schedule included:

- NFL Kickoff Game: The season started on September 7, featuring the Kansas City Chiefs at the defending Super Bowl LI champion New England Patriots, with the Chiefs winning 42–27.
- NFL International Series: The International Series underwent a split in branding, with each country's games receiving their own brand.
  - NFL London Games: Four games were played in London: the Baltimore Ravens at the Jacksonville Jaguars at Wembley Stadium on September 24, the New Orleans Saints at the Miami Dolphins at Wembley Stadium on October 1, the Arizona Cardinals at the Los Angeles Rams at Twickenham Stadium on October 22, and the Minnesota Vikings at the Cleveland Browns at Twickenham Stadium on October 29. The Jaguars, Saints, Rams, and Vikings won these games 44–7, 20–0, 33–0 and 33–16 respectively.
  - NFL Mexico Game: One game was played at Estadio Azteca in Mexico City: the New England Patriots at the Oakland Raiders on November 19. The Patriots won this game 33–8. This marked the second consecutive year in which the Raiders have hosted a game in Mexico City.
- Thanksgiving Day: As has been the case since 2006, three games were played on November 23: the Minnesota Vikings at the Detroit Lions and the Los Angeles Chargers at the Dallas Cowboys in the traditional afternoon doubleheader, and the New York Giants at the Washington Redskins in the nightcap. The Vikings, Chargers, and Redskins won these games 30–23, 28–6, and 20–10 respectively.
- Christmas games: Christmas Day, December 25, fell on a Monday. Sunday Night Football moved from December 24, Christmas Eve, to Saturday, December 23, with the Minnesota at the Green Bay Packers. The Sunday afternoon games were played as normal on Christmas Eve. A doubleheader was played on Christmas Day, with a late-afternoon game featuring the Pittsburgh Steelers at the Houston Texans and the Oakland Raiders at the Philadelphia Eagles in the normal Monday Night Football game. The Vikings, Steelers, and Eagles won these contests 16–0, 34–6, and 19–10 respectively.

The entire schedule was released on April 20, 2017.

=== In-season scheduling changes ===
The following games were moved or canceled because of severe weather, by way of flexible scheduling, or for other reasons:

- Preseason Week 4: Due to the effects of Hurricane Harvey in the Houston area, the Dallas–Houston game was eventually canceled. The 2017 Texas Governor's Cup preseason game, originally scheduled to be played at Houston's NRG Stadium, was initially moved to the Cowboys' AT&T Stadium, before the NFL opted instead to cancel the game altogether in order to allow Texans' players and coaches to reunite with their families and assist with the relief efforts.
- Week 1: Due to the threat posed from Hurricane Irma, the Tampa Bay–Miami game was rescheduled to Week 11 (November 19), when both teams were originally scheduled to have their bye week. Both teams therefore had their bye rescheduled to Week 1. This is the first time a hurricane forced a postponement of an NFL game since 2008 when Baltimore and Houston had their game postponed due to Hurricane Ike.
- Week 7: The Cincinnati–Pittsburgh game, originally scheduled to start at 1:00 p.m. ET, was moved to 4:25 p.m. ET, still on CBS. In addition, the Carolina–Chicago game was cross-flexed from Fox to CBS, still at 1:00 p.m. ET.
- Week 12: The New Orleans–Los Angeles Rams game, originally scheduled to start at 4:05 p.m. ET on Fox, was cross-flexed and moved to 4:25 p.m. ET on CBS. In addition, the Tennessee–Indianapolis game was cross-flexed from CBS to Fox, still at 1:00 p.m. ET.
- Week 13: The Carolina–New Orleans game, originally scheduled to start at 1:00 p.m. ET, was moved to 4:25 p.m. ET, still on Fox. In addition, the Denver–Miami game was cross-flexed from CBS to Fox, still at 1:00 p.m. ET.
- Week 14: The Dallas–New York Giants game, originally scheduled to start at 4:25 p.m. ET, was moved to 1:00 p.m. ET, still on Fox. In addition, the Seattle–Jacksonville game, originally scheduled to start at 1:00 p.m. ET, was moved to 4:25 p.m. ET, still on Fox.
- Week 15: The Houston–Jacksonville game was cross-flexed from CBS to Fox, still at 1:00 p.m. ET.
- Week 17: All games with playoff implications were moved to a 4:25 p.m. ET kickoff, with no change in network assignment: Cincinnati–Baltimore, Buffalo–Miami, Jacksonville–Tennessee, Carolina–Atlanta, and New Orleans–Tampa Bay. Additionally, no Sunday Night Football game was scheduled for the first time since 2009, marking the first time since 1977 that the regular season play concluded with no primetime game. The NFL stated that it did not want to schedule a primetime game that could potentially lose its playoff implications due to the events of the afternoon games, as well as conflicting with New Year's Eve programming.

== Regular season standings ==
=== Division ===
AFC East
	W	L	T	PCT	DIV	CONF	PF	PA	STK
^{(1)} New England Patriots	13	3	0	.813	5–1	10–2	458	296	W3
^{(6)} Buffalo Bills	9	7	0	.563	3–3	7–5	302	359	W1
Miami Dolphins	6	10	0	.375	2–4	5–7	281	393	L3
New York Jets	5	11	0	.313	2–4	5–7	298	382	L4

AFC North
	W	L	T	PCT	DIV	CONF	PF	PA	STK
^{(2)} Pittsburgh Steelers	13	3	0	.813	6–0	10–2	406	308	W2
Baltimore Ravens	9	7	0	.563	3–3	7–5	395	303	L1
Cincinnati Bengals	7	9	0	.438	3–3	6–6	290	349	W2
Cleveland Browns	0	16	0	.000	0–6	0–12	234	410	L16

AFC South
	W	L	T	PCT	DIV	CONF	PF	PA	STK
^{(3)} Jacksonville Jaguars	10	6	0	.625	4–2	9–3	417	268	L2
^{(5)} Tennessee Titans	9	7	0	.563	5–1	8–4	334	356	W1
Indianapolis Colts	4	12	0	.250	2–4	3–9	263	404	W1
Houston Texans	4	12	0	.250	1–5	3–9	338	436	L6

AFC West
	W	L	T	PCT	DIV	CONF	PF	PA	STK
^{(4)} Kansas City Chiefs	10	6	0	.625	5–1	8–4	415	339	W4
Los Angeles Chargers	9	7	0	.563	3–3	6–6	355	272	W2
Oakland Raiders	6	10	0	.375	2–4	5–7	301	373	L4
Denver Broncos	5	11	0	.313	2–4	4–8	289	382	L2

NFC East
	W	L	T	PCT	DIV	CONF	PF	PA	STK
^{(1)} Philadelphia Eagles	13	3	0	.813	5–1	10–2	457	295	L1
Dallas Cowboys	9	7	0	.563	5–1	7–5	354	332	W1
Washington Redskins	7	9	0	.438	1–5	5–7	342	388	L1
New York Giants	3	13	0	.188	1–5	1–11	246	388	W1

NFC North
	W	L	T	PCT	DIV	CONF	PF	PA	STK
^{(2)} Minnesota Vikings	13	3	0	.813	5–1	10–2	382	252	W3
Detroit Lions	9	7	0	.563	5–1	8–4	410	376	W1
Green Bay Packers	7	9	0	.438	2–4	5–7	320	384	L3
Chicago Bears	5	11	0	.313	0–6	1–11	264	320	L1

NFC South
	W	L	T	PCT	DIV	CONF	PF	PA	STK
^{(4)} New Orleans Saints	11	5	0	.688	4–2	8–4	448	326	L1
^{(5)} Carolina Panthers	11	5	0	.688	3–3	7–5	363	327	L1
^{(6)} Atlanta Falcons	10	6	0	.625	4–2	9–3	353	315	W1
Tampa Bay Buccaneers	5	11	0	.313	1–5	3–9	335	382	W1

NFC West
	W	L	T	PCT	DIV	CONF	PF	PA	STK
^{(3)} Los Angeles Rams	11	5	0	.688	4–2	7–5	478	329	L1
Seattle Seahawks	9	7	0	.563	4–2	7–5	366	332	L1
Arizona Cardinals	8	8	0	.500	3–3	5–7	295	361	W2
San Francisco 49ers	6	10	0	.375	1–5	3–9	331	383	W5

=== Conference ===
AFC
#	Team	Division	W	L	T	PCT	DIV	CONF	SOS	SOV	STK
Division leaders
1 (Note: New England claimed the No. 1 seed over Pittsburgh based on head-to-head victory.)	New England Patriots	East	13	3	0	.813	5–1	10–2	.484	.466	W3
2	Pittsburgh Steelers	North	13	3	0	.813	6–0	10–2	.453	.423	W2
3 (Note: Jacksonville claimed the No. 3 seed over Kansas City based on conference record.)	Jacksonville Jaguars	South	10	6	0	.625	4–2	9–3	.434	.394	L2
4	Kansas City Chiefs	West	10	6	0	.625	5–1	8–4	.477	.481	W4
Wild Cards
5 (Note: Tennessee finished ahead of Buffalo, Baltimore and Los Angeles Chargers based on conference record, claiming the No. 5 seed. Buffalo and Baltimore finished ahead of Los Angeles Chargers based on conference record. Buffalo claimed the No. 6 seed over Baltimore based on strength of victory.)	Tennessee Titans	South	9	7	0	.563	5–1	8–4	.434	.396	W1
6	Buffalo Bills	East	9	7	0	.563	3–3	7–5	.492	.396	W1
Did not qualify for the postseason
7	Baltimore Ravens	North	9	7	0	.563	3–3	7–5	.441	.299	L1
8	Los Angeles Chargers	West	9	7	0	.563	3–3	6–6	.457	.347	W2
9	Cincinnati Bengals	North	7	9	0	.438	3–3	6–6	.465	.321	W2
10 (Note: Oakland finished ahead of Miami based on head-to-head victory.)	Oakland Raiders	West	6	10	0	.375	2–4	5–7	.512	.396	L4
11	Miami Dolphins	East	6	10	0	.375	2–4	5–7	.543	.531	L3
12 (Note: Denver finished ahead of the New York Jets based on head-to-head victory.)	Denver Broncos	West	5	11	0	.313	2–4	4–8	.492	.413	L2
13	New York Jets	East	5	11	0	.313	2–4	5–7	.520	.438	L4
14 (Note: Indianapolis finished ahead of Houston based on head-to-head sweep.)	Indianapolis Colts	South	4	12	0	.250	2–4	3–9	.480	.219	W1
15	Houston Texans	South	4	12	0	.250	1–5	3–9	.516	.375	L6
16	Cleveland Browns	North	0	16	0	.000	0–6	0–12	.520	–	L16
Tiebreakers (Note: When breaking ties for three or more teams under the NFL's rules, they are first broken within divisions, then comparing only the highest ranked remaining team from each division.)

NFC
#	Team	Division	W	L	T	PCT	DIV	CONF	SOS	SOV	STK
Division leaders
1 (Note: Philadelphia claimed the No. 1 seed over Minnesota based on winning percentage vs. common opponents. Philadelphia's cumulative record against Carolina, Chicago, the Los Angeles Rams and Washington was 5–0, compared to Minnesota's 4–1 cumulative record against the same four teams.)	Philadelphia Eagles	East	13	3	0	.813	5–1	10–2	.461	.433	L1
2	Minnesota Vikings	North	13	3	0	.813	5–1	10–2	.492	.447	W3
3 (Note: LA Rams claimed the No. 3 seed over New Orleans based on head-to-head victory.)	Los Angeles Rams	West	11	5	0	.688	4–2	7–5	.504	.460	L1
4 (Note: New Orleans clinched the NFC South division over Carolina based on head-to-head sweep.)	New Orleans Saints	South	11	5	0	.688	4–2	8–4	.535	.483	L1
Wild Cards
5	Carolina Panthers	South	11	5	0	.688	3–3	7–5	.539	.500	L1
6	Atlanta Falcons	South	10	6	0	.625	4–2	9–3	.543	.475	W1
Did not qualify for the postseason
7 (Note: Detroit finished ahead of Dallas and Seattle based on conference record, while Seattle finished ahead of Dallas based on head-to-head victory.)	Detroit Lions	North	9	7	0	.563	5–1	8–4	.496	.368	W1
8	Seattle Seahawks	West	9	7	0	.563	4–2	7–5	.492	.444	L1
9	Dallas Cowboys	East	9	7	0	.563	5–1	7–5	.496	.438	W1
10	Arizona Cardinals	West	8	8	0	.500	3–3	5–7	.488	.406	W2
11 (Note: Green Bay finished ahead of Washington based on record vs. common opponents. Green Bay's cumulative record against Dallas, Minnesota, New Orleans and Seattle was 2–3, compared to Washington's 1–4 cumulative record against the same four teams.)	Green Bay Packers	North	7	9	0	.438	2–4	5–7	.539	.357	L3
12	Washington Redskins	East	7	9	0	.438	1–5	5–7	.539	.429	L1
13	San Francisco 49ers	West	6	10	0	.375	1–5	3–9	.512	.438	W5
14 (Note: Tampa Bay finished ahead of Chicago based on head-to-head victory.)	Tampa Bay Buccaneers	South	5	11	0	.313	1–5	3–9	.555	.375	W1
15	Chicago Bears	North	5	11	0	.313	0–6	1–11	.559	.500	L1
16	New York Giants	East	3	13	0	.188	1–5	1–11	.531	.458	W1
Tiebreakers (Note: When breaking ties for three or more teams under the NFL's rules, they are first broken within divisions, then comparing only the highest-ranked remaining team from each division.)

== Postseason ==
The 2017 playoffs began on January 6–7, 2018 with the Wild Card playoff round. The four winners of these playoff games visited the top two seeded teams in each conference in the Divisional round games played on January 13–14. The winners of those games advanced the Conference championship games was held on January 21. The two Conference champions advanced to Super Bowl LII was held on February 4 at U.S. Bank Stadium in Minneapolis. The 2018 Pro Bowl was held at Camping World Stadium in Orlando on January 28.

=== Bracket ===
Jan 7 – Mercedes-Benz Superdome	Jan 14 – U.S. Bank Stadium
5	Carolina	26
4	New Orleans	24
4	New Orleans	31	Jan 21 – Lincoln Financial Field
2	Minnesota	29
NFC
Jan 6 – Los Angeles Memorial Coliseum	2	Minnesota	7
Jan 13 – Lincoln Financial Field
1	Philadelphia	38
6	Atlanta	26	NFC Championship
6	Atlanta	10
3	LA Rams	13	Feb 4 – U.S. Bank Stadium
1	Philadelphia	15
Wild-card round
Divisional round
Jan 7 – EverBank Field	N1	Philadelphia	41
Jan 14 – Heinz Field
A1	New England	33
6	Buffalo	3	Super Bowl LII
3	Jacksonville	45
3	Jacksonville	10	Jan 21 – Gillette Stadium
2	Pittsburgh	42
AFC
Jan 6 – Arrowhead Stadium	3	Jacksonville	20
Jan 13 – Gillette Stadium
1	New England	24
5	Tennessee	22	AFC Championship
5	Tennessee	14
4	Kansas City	21
1	New England	35

== Notable events ==
=== Protesting police brutality ===
During a September 22, 2017 speech, the President of the United States, Donald Trump, made controversial remarks criticizing the practice of taking a knee during the playing of the national anthem—a practice popularized by Colin Kaepernick in 2016 as part of an effort to protest alleged racial inequality and police brutality. Trump suggested that those who partake in the practice were disrespecting the country's heritage, and asked his audience, "wouldn't you love to see one of these NFL owners, when somebody disrespects our flag, to say, 'Get that son of a bitch off the field right now. Out! He's fired. He's fired!'" During the subsequent weekend of games, over 200 players protested the remarks, by either kneeling or locking arms during the playing of the national anthem. The Pittsburgh Steelers (with the exception of offensive tackle and former Army Ranger Alejandro Villanueva), Tennessee Titans and Seattle Seahawks chose to not go out on field at all during the anthem.

=== Sale of the Carolina Panthers ===
On December 17, 2017, Jerry Richardson, owner of the Carolina Panthers, announced he was putting the team up for sale. Richardson had previously indicated the team would be put up for sale after his death (since his only living son left the team in 2009), but an expose in Sports Illustrated accused Richardson of paying hush money to cover up questionable conduct, including racial slurs and sexually suggestive requests of employees, hastening Richardson's decision. The Panthers' lease on Bank of America Stadium expired after the 2018 season, which would have allowed any incoming owner to relocate the team out of the Carolinas to another market of their choice without penalty had they so desired.

== Records, milestones, and notable statistics ==
Week 1

- Kareem Hunt finished with 246 total yards, setting the record for the most total yards (rushing and receiving) in an NFL debut.

Week 2

- Antonio Gates scored his 112th career receiving touchdown, breaking the NFL record for most receiving touchdowns by a tight end. The previous record of 111 was held by Tony Gonzalez.
- Aaron Rodgers passed for his 300th touchdown, surpassing Peyton Manning as the fastest quarterback to reach that milestone both in attempts and appearances.

Week 3

- Odell Beckham Jr. broke the record for fastest receiver to reach 300 career receptions, doing so in 45 games.
- Matt Prater broke the previous NFL record of three made field goals from more than 55 yards in a season by kicking a 57-yard field goal against the Atlanta Falcons.
- Jake Elliott kicked a 61-yard field goal, the longest for a rookie in NFL history.

Week 5

- Larry Fitzgerald became the third player in NFL history to record 200 straight games with a reception, joining Jerry Rice and Tony Gonzalez.

Week 6

- Tom Brady recorded his 187th career regular season win as a starting quarterback, setting an NFL record. The previous record of 186 wins was shared by Peyton Manning and Brett Favre.

Week 7

- Drew Brees became the third player in NFL history to record 500 or more career passing touchdowns (including playoffs), joining Brett Favre, and Peyton Manning.
- Eddie Jackson became the first player in NFL history with multiple defensive touchdowns of at least 75 yards in the same game.

Week 9

- Matt Ryan passed for 39,858 career yards after 150 career games, breaking the record for most passing yards by a player in NFL history in his first 150 games previously held by Drew Brees.
- Eli Manning became the seventh quarterback in NFL history with at least 50,000 passing yards.

Week 10

- Larry Fitzgerald became the sixth player in NFL history to record 15,000 career receiving yards. He's the second-youngest player in NFL history to do it, behind Jerry Rice.
- Matt Ryan reached 40,000 career passing yards in 151 games, the fewest games in NFL history, surpassing the previous record held by Drew Brees (152 games).

Week 11

- Larry Fitzgerald passed Tony Gonzalez into fifth place all-time in receiving yards.

Week 12

- Julio Jones had 563 catches for 8,649 yards in 90 career games, the most by a player in his first 90 games in NFL history. He passed Anquan Boldin (558) for the most receptions and Lance Alworth (8,502) for the most receiving yards.
- Russell Wilson became the quarterback with most wins in a player's first six seasons with 63 wins, surpassing Joe Flacco.
- Eli Manning became the eighth quarterback to lose 100 starts and the first to do so with one team.

Week 13

- By defeating the Buffalo Bills, Tom Brady broke the record for most wins by a quarterback against one team, with 27. The record was previously held by Brett Favre, who had defeated the Detroit Lions 26 times.
- Larry Fitzgerald moved into fourth place all-time in receiving yards, passing Isaac Bruce.
- Larry Fitzgerald surpassed 1,200 career receptions, becoming the third player in NFL history to reach this mark (joining Jerry Rice and Tony Gonzalez) and the fastest player to reach this milestone in 214 games (breaking Rice's record of 221 games).
- Russell Wilson tied Eli Manning in 2011 for the most fourth quarter touchdowns in a single season with 15.
- Frank Gore moved past Jerome Bettis and LaDainian Tomlinson for fifth place all-time in rushing yards.

Week 14

- Larry Fitzgerald moved into third place all-time in receiving yards, passing Randy Moss.
- Ben Roethlisberger became the first quarterback in NFL history to throw for at least 500 yards in three different games.
- He also set the record for most completions in a regulation game, with 44.

Week 15

- LeSean McCoy surpassed 10,000 career rushing yards, becoming the 30th player in league history to reach the milestone.

Week 16

- The New England Patriots have won at least 12 games in eight consecutive seasons, surpassing the 2003–09 Indianapolis Colts for the longest such streak in NFL history.
- Drew Brees became the third quarterback to throw for 70,000 yards, joining Peyton Manning and Brett Favre. Brees reached the milestone in his 248th career game and is the fastest in league history to accomplish the feat.
- Drew Brees surpassed the 4,000 passing yards for the 12th consecutive season, extending his own record.

Week 17

- The Cleveland Browns joined the 2008 Detroit Lions as the only teams since the implementation of the 16-game season to lose every game in a season.
- The Buffalo Bills ended the NFL's longest active playoff drought at 17 seasons, making their first playoff appearance since 1999.
- Frank Gore surpassed 14,000 career rushing yards, becoming the fifth player in NFL history to do so, after Emmitt Smith, Walter Payton, Barry Sanders, and Curtis Martin.

=== Postseason ===
Wild Card Round

- The Tennessee Titans became the third away team in NFL history to have rallied from at least 18 points down to win a playoff game, joining the 1957 Detroit Lions and the 1972 Dallas Cowboys
- Marcus Mariota attempted a pass, which was deflected by Darrelle Revis, back into the hands of Mariota who promptly ran it in for a touchdown, making him the first quarterback in NFL postseason history to complete a touchdown pass to himself. This also made him the first player in the Super Bowl era with passing and receiving touchdowns in the same playoff game.

Super Bowl LII

- Super Bowl LII marked an NFL record eighth Super Bowl appearance for Tom Brady and Bill Belichick a QB/head coach duo.
- It also marked the New England Patriots' 10th Super Bowl appearance, extending their own record.
- Tom Brady's career 357 pass attempts, 235 completions, 2,576 passing yards, and 18 passing touchdowns in the Super Bowl are all records.
- Tom Brady set the single-game record for most passing yards in a Super Bowl with 505.
- The 33 points scored by the Patriots were the most points scored by the losing team in a Super Bowl, until the Philadelphia Eagles surpassed it with 35 in Super Bowl LVII.
- The Patriots set Super Bowl records for most total yards in a game with 613, the fewest punts in a game with zero, and the most passing yards with 505.
- Jake Elliott set the Super Bowl rookie record by kicking a 46-yard field goal.
- The Patriots and the Philadelphia Eagles combined for several Super Bowl records including, 42 first downs passing, 1,151 total yards, 874 passing yards, fewest punts in the game with one, and four missed PAT conversions. The 1,151 total yards set a record for the most combined yards in any NFL game (regular or post-season)

== Regular season statistical leaders ==
Individual
Scoring leader	Greg Zuerlein, Los Angeles Rams (158)
Most field goals made	Robbie Gould, San Francisco (39 FGs)
Touchdowns	Todd Gurley, Los Angeles Rams (19 TDs)
Rushing	Kareem Hunt, Kansas City (1,327 yards)
Passing yards	Tom Brady, New England (4,577 yards)
Passing touchdowns	Russell Wilson, Seattle (34 TDs)
Passer rating	Alex Smith, Kansas City (104.7 rating)
Pass receptions	Jarvis Landry, Miami (112 catches)
Pass receiving yards	Antonio Brown, Pittsburgh (1,533 yards)
Combined tackles	Preston Brown, Buffalo (144 tackles)
Interceptions	Kevin Byard, Tennessee and Darius Slay, Detroit (8)
Punting	Shane Lechler, Houston (4,507 yards, 49.0 average yards)
Sacks	Chandler Jones, Arizona (17)

== Awards ==
=== Individual season awards ===
The 7th NFL Honors, saluting the best players and plays from 2017 season, was held at the Northrop Auditorium in Minneapolis, Minnesota on February 3, 2018.

Award	Winner	Position	Team
AP Most Valuable Player	Tom Brady	Quarterback	New England Patriots
AP Offensive Player of the Year	Todd Gurley	Running back	Los Angeles Rams
AP Defensive Player of the Year	Aaron Donald	Defensive tackle	Los Angeles Rams
AP Coach of the Year	Sean McVay	Head coach	Los Angeles Rams
AP Assistant Coach of the Year	Pat Shurmur	Offensive coordinator	Minnesota Vikings
AP Offensive Rookie of the Year	Alvin Kamara	Running back	New Orleans Saints
AP Defensive Rookie of the Year	Marshon Lattimore	Cornerback	New Orleans Saints
AP Comeback Player of the Year	Keenan Allen	Wide receiver	Los Angeles Chargers
Pepsi Rookie of the Year	Alvin Kamara	Running back	New Orleans Saints
Walter Payton NFL Man of the Year	J. J. Watt	Defensive end	Houston Texans
PFWA NFL Executive of the Year	Howie Roseman	Executive VP of football operations	Philadelphia Eagles
Super Bowl Most Valuable Player	Nick Foles	Quarterback	Philadelphia Eagles

=== All-Pro team ===
The following players were named First Team All-Pro by the Associated Press:

Offense
Quarterback	Tom Brady, New England
Running back	Todd Gurley, Los Angeles Rams
Flex	Le'Veon Bell, Pittsburgh
Wide receiver	Antonio Brown, Pittsburgh; DeAndre Hopkins, Houston
Tight end	Rob Gronkowski, New England
Left tackle	Andrew Whitworth, Los Angeles Rams
Left guard	Andrew Norwell, Carolina
Center	Jason Kelce, Philadelphia
Right guard	David DeCastro, Pittsburgh
Right tackle	Lane Johnson, Philadelphia

Defense
Edge rusher	Calais Campbell, Jacksonville; Cameron Jordan, New Orleans
Interior lineman	Aaron Donald, Los Angeles Rams; Cam Heyward, Pittsburgh
Linebacker	Chandler Jones, Arizona; Bobby Wagner, Seattle; Luke Kuechly, Carolina
Cornerback	Jalen Ramsey, Jacksonville; Xavier Rhodes, Minnesota
Safety	Kevin Byard, Tennessee; Harrison Smith, Minnesota

Special teams
Placekicker	Greg Zuerlein, Los Angeles Rams
Punter	Johnny Hekker, Los Angeles Rams
Kick returner	Pharoh Cooper, Los Angeles Rams
Special teams	Budda Baker, Arizona

=== Players of the week/month ===
The following were named the top performers during the 2017 season:

Week/ Month	Offensive		Defensive		Special Teams	
Week/ Month	AFC	NFC	AFC	NFC	AFC	NFC
1	Alex Smith (Chiefs)	Sam Bradford (Vikings)	Calais Campbell (Jaguars)	Trumaine Johnson (Rams)	Giorgio Tavecchio (Raiders)	Matt Prater (Lions)
2	Tom Brady (Patriots)	J. J. Nelson (Cardinals)	Chris Jones (Chiefs)	Desmond Trufant (Falcons)	Cody Parkey (Dolphins)	Jamal Agnew (Lions)
3	Tom Brady (Patriots)	Kirk Cousins (Redskins)	Terrence Brooks (Jets)	DeMarcus Lawrence (Cowboys)	Steven Hauschka (Bills)	Jake Elliott (Eagles)
Sept.	Kareem Hunt (Chiefs)	Todd Gurley (Rams)	Melvin Ingram (Chargers)	DeMarcus Lawrence (Cowboys)	Ryan Succop (Titans)	Matt Prater (Lions)
4	Deshaun Watson (Texans)	Todd Gurley (Rams)	Cameron Heyward (Steelers)	Julius Peppers (Panthers)	Steven Hauschka (Bills)	Greg Zuerlein (Rams)
5	Melvin Gordon (Chargers)	Aaron Rodgers (Packers)	Telvin Smith (Jaguars)	Earl Thomas (Seahawks)	Adam Vinatieri (Colts)	Kenjon Barner (Eagles)
6	Le'Veon Bell (Steelers)	Adrian Peterson (Cardinals)	Johnathan Joseph (Texans)	Cameron Jordan (Saints)	Ryan Succop (Titans)	Pharoh Cooper (Rams)
7	Amari Cooper (Raiders)	Carson Wentz (Eagles)	Kevin Byard (Titans)	Eddie Jackson (Bears)	Travis Benjamin (Chargers)	Kai Forbath (Vikings)
8	JuJu Smith-Schuster (Steelers)	Russell Wilson (Seahawks)	Carlos Dunlap (Bengals)	Jalen Mills (Eagles)	Harrison Butker (Chiefs)	Tyrone Crawford (Cowboys)
Oct.	Deshaun Watson (Texans)	Carson Wentz (Eagles)	Micah Hyde (Bills)	Everson Griffen (Vikings)	Harrison Butker (Chiefs)	Greg Zuerlein (Rams)
9	T. Y. Hilton (Colts)	Jared Goff (Rams)	Jordan Jenkins (Jets)	Karlos Dansby (Cardinals)	Jaydon Mickens (Jaguars)	Justin Hardee (Saints)
10	Tom Brady (Patriots)	Cam Newton (Panthers)	A. J. Bouye (Jaguars)	Adrian Clayborn (Falcons)	Dion Lewis (Patriots)	Greg Zuerlein (Rams)
11	Antonio Brown (Steelers)	Mark Ingram II (Saints)	Matthew Judon (Ravens)	Landon Collins (Giants)	Stephen Gostkowski (Patriots)	Tyler Lockett (Seahawks)
12	Philip Rivers (Chargers)	Julio Jones (Falcons)	Cameron Heyward (Steelers)	Luke Kuechly (Panthers)	Sam Koch (Ravens)	Phil Dawson (Cardinals)
Nov.	Tom Brady (Patriots)	Case Keenum (Vikings)	Casey Hayward (Chargers)	Cameron Jordan (Saints)	Justin Tucker (Ravens)	Greg Zuerlein (Rams)
13	Josh McCown (Jets)	Russell Wilson (Seahawks)	Eric Weddle (Ravens)	Dean Lowry (Packers)	Chris Boswell (Steelers)	Robbie Gould (49ers)
14	Ben Roethlisberger (Steelers)	Jonathan Stewart (Panthers)	Xavien Howard (Dolphins)	Deion Jones (Falcons)	Jaydon Mickens (Jaguars)	Trevor Davis (Packers)
15	Rob Gronkowski (Patriots)	Todd Gurley (Rams)	Marcus Peters (Chiefs)	Darius Slay (Lions)	Sam Koch (Ravens)	Robbie Gould (49ers)
16	Dion Lewis (Patriots)	Todd Gurley (Rams)	Mike Hilton (Steelers)	Harrison Smith (Vikings)	Harrison Butker (Chiefs)	Damiere Byrd (Panthers)
17	Philip Rivers (Chargers)	Chris Godwin (Buccaneers)	Kevin Byard (Titans)	Ezekiel Ansah (Lions)	JuJu Smith-Schuster (Steelers)	Matt Bryant (Falcons)
Dec.	Le'Veon Bell (Steelers)	Todd Gurley (Rams)	Jordan Poyer (Bills)	Chandler Jones (Cardinals)	Harrison Butker (Chiefs)	Robbie Gould (49ers)

Week	FedEx Air Player of the Week	FedEx Ground Player of the Week	Pepsi Rookie of the Week	Castrol Edge Clutch Performer of the Week
1	Alex Smith (Chiefs)	Kareem Hunt (Chiefs)	Kareem Hunt (Chiefs)	Alex Smith (Chiefs)
2	Trevor Siemian (Broncos)	C. J. Anderson (Broncos)	Tyus Bowser (Ravens)	Trevor Siemian (Broncos)
3	Tom Brady (Patriots)	Kareem Hunt (Chiefs)	Jake Elliott (Eagles)	Jake Elliott (Eagles)
4	Deshaun Watson (Texans)	Le'Veon Bell (Steelers)	Alvin Kamara (Saints)	Deshaun Watson (Texans)
5	Carson Wentz (Eagles)	Leonard Fournette (Jaguars)	Aaron Jones (Packers)	Aaron Rodgers (Packers)
6	Carson Wentz (Eagles)	Adrian Peterson (Cardinals)	Marshon Lattimore (Saints)	Mark Ingram II (Saints)
7	Derek Carr (Raiders)	Aaron Jones (Packers)	Aaron Jones (Packers)	Carson Wentz (Eagles)
8	Russell Wilson (Seahawks)	LeSean McCoy (Bills)	Marshon Lattimore (Saints)	Russell Wilson (Seahawks)
9	Jay Cutler (Dolphins)	Alvin Kamara (Saints)	Alvin Kamara (Saints)	Carson Wentz (Eagles)
10	Case Keenum (Vikings)	Mark Ingram II (Saints)	Alvin Kamara (Saints)	Mark Ingram II (Saints)
11	Drew Brees (Saints)	Mark Ingram II (Saints)	Alvin Kamara (Saints)	Drew Brees (Saints)
12	Philip Rivers (Chargers)	Alvin Kamara (Saints)	Alvin Kamara (Saints)	Antonio Brown (Steelers)
13	Alex Smith (Chiefs)	Jamaal Williams (Packers)	Alvin Kamara (Saints)	Aaron Jones (Packers)
14	Ben Roethlisberger (Steelers)	LeSean McCoy (Bills)	Jamaal Williams (Packers)	Davante Adams (Packers)
15	Jimmy Garoppolo (49ers)	Todd Gurley (Rams)	Marshon Lattimore (Saints)	Jimmy Garoppolo (49ers)
16	Jared Goff (Rams)	Todd Gurley (Rams)	Marshon Lattimore (Saints)	Jimmy Garoppolo (49ers)
17	Philip Rivers (Chargers)	Orleans Darkwa (Giants)	Alvin Kamara (Saints)	Tyler Boyd (Bengals)

Month	Rookie of the Month	
Month	Offensive	Defensive
Sept.	Kareem Hunt (Chiefs)	Tre'Davious White (Bills)
Oct.	Deshaun Watson (Texans)	Marshon Lattimore (Saints)
Nov.	Alvin Kamara (Saints)	Reuben Foster (49ers)
Dec.	Kareem Hunt (Chiefs)	Marshon Lattimore (Saints)

== Head coaching and front office personnel changes ==
=== Head coaches ===
==== Offseason ====
Team	2016 head coach	2016 interim	2017 replacement	Reason for leaving	Notes
Buffalo Bills	Rex Ryan	Anthony Lynn	Sean McDermott	Fired	Ryan was fired with one week remaining in the 2016 regular season and a 15–16 record with no playoff appearances in two seasons. Lynn began the 2016 season as running backs coach, then moved to offensive coordinator when Greg Roman was fired in week 3, then interim head coach after the Ryans' dismissal. Lynn lost his one game as interim head coach. Former Carolina Panthers' defensive coordinator Sean McDermott was named as the Bills' new head coach on January 11, 2017. This marks McDermott's first head coaching job.
Denver Broncos	Gary Kubiak		Vance Joseph	Retired	Kubiak retired from coaching after two seasons due to health concerns, with a victory in Super Bowl 50 and a 24–10 record, including postseason games. Kubiak would later return to the Broncos six months later, working for their front office as a Senior Personnel Advisor. Joseph, who spent the previous season as the Miami Dolphins' defensive coordinator, was hired on January 11, 2017, marking his first head coaching position.
Jacksonville Jaguars	Gus Bradley	Doug Marrone		Fired	Bradley was fired with two weeks remaining in the 2016 season and a 14–48 (.226) record with no playoff appearances in four seasons. Marrone, the Jaguars' offensive line coach, was previously head coach of the Buffalo Bills from 2013 to 2014; he went 1–1 in his two games as interim head coach of the Jaguars. On January 9, 2017, the Jaguars announced that Marrone would be named permanent head coach.
Los Angeles Chargers	Mike McCoy		Anthony Lynn	Fired	McCoy was fired after four seasons, with one playoff appearance and a 27–37 record. Lynn was hired as the Chargers' new head coach on January 12, 2017. He previously coached one game as interim head coach of the Buffalo Bills in 2016, with an 0–1 record.
Los Angeles Rams	Jeff Fisher	John Fassel	Sean McVay	Fired	Fisher was fired after going 4–9 through the first 13 games of the 2016 season, and 31–45–1 (.414) in his five-year tenure with the Rams, with no playoff appearances. Fassel, the son of former NFL head coach Jim Fassel, has been the Rams' special teams coach since 2012; he went 0–3 in the interim. On January 12, former Washington Redskins offensive coordinator Sean McVay was named head coach. At the time of his hiring, McVay was 30 years old, making him the youngest head coach in NFL history (excluding the player-coaches of the 1920s).
San Francisco 49ers	Chip Kelly		Kyle Shanahan	Fired	Kelly was fired after one season with a 2–14 record. Shanahan, who most recently served as the Atlanta Falcons' offensive coordinator, was named the new coach of the 49ers on February 6, 2017. This marked Shanahan's first head coaching position.

==== In-season ====
Team	2017 head coach	Reason for leaving	Interim replacement	Notes
New York Giants	Ben McAdoo	Fired	Steve Spagnuolo	McAdoo became the Giants' head coach in 2016, leading the Giants to a 13–15 (.464) record over the course of parts of two seasons. After accruing a 2–10 (.167) record and benching popular starter Eli Manning (who at the time held the longest active streak as a starting NFL quarterback) during the season, he was fired on December 4, and replaced in the interim by defensive coordinator Steve Spagnuolo, who was previously the St. Louis Rams' head coach from 2009 to 2011.

=== Front office personnel ===
==== Offseason ====
Team	Position	2016 office holder	Reason for leaving	2017 office holder	Notes
San Francisco 49ers	GM	Trent Baalke	Fired	John Lynch	Baalke, who spent the past twelve years with the team, informed KNBR-AM in San Francisco on January 1, 2017, that he had been fired. On January 29, 2017, Lynch, a former player and broadcaster, was named the general manager of the San Francisco 49ers; it is his first front office position.
Jacksonville Jaguars	EVP-FO	position created		Tom Coughlin	Coughlin, the team's inaugural head coach, was rehired as executive vice president of football operations on January 9, 2017. He had spent the 2016 season out of football after several years of coaching the New York Giants.
Indianapolis Colts	GM	Ryan Grigson	Fired	Chris Ballard	Grigson was relieved of his duties as Colts general manager on January 21, 2017. On January 30, 2017, Chris Ballard, who had spent the past four seasons as director of football operations for the Kansas City Chiefs, was named the new GM of the Colts.
Washington Redskins	GM	Scot McCloughan	Fired	Bruce Allen (de facto)	McCloughan was fired on March 9, 2017, after two seasons with the Redskins. Team president Bruce Allen became the de facto general manager upon McCloughan's firing.
Buffalo Bills	GM	Doug Whaley	Fired	Brandon Beane	Whaley was fired the morning of April 30, 2017, immediately following the draft. He had spent seven seasons with the Bills, four of them as general manager. Brandon Beane, who had spent the previous 19 seasons with the Carolina Panthers (most recently as assistant general manager), was hired as the new general manager on May 9, 2017.
Kansas City Chiefs	GM	John Dorsey	Fired	Brett Veach	Dorsey was unexpectedly fired on June 22, 2017, after four seasons. Brett Veach, who had spent the past four seasons as the Chiefs co-director of player personnel, was promoted to general manager on July 10, 2017.
Carolina Panthers	GM	Dave Gettleman	Fired	Marty Hurney	Gettleman was also unexpectedly fired after four seasons on July 17, 2017. Marty Hurney, who was the Panthers' GM from 2002 to 2012, was rehired as the interim general manager for the 2017 season and was later named general manager on a permanent basis.

==== In-season ====
Team	Position	2017 office holder	Reason for leaving	Interim replacement	Notes
New York Giants	GM	Jerry Reese	Fired	Kevin Abrams	Having been in the organization since 1994, Reese was the Giants GM since 2007, leading them to two Super Bowl championships and several years of success. He was fired on December 4 along with head coach Ben McAdoo. He was replaced in the interim by assistant general manager Kevin Abrams.
Cleveland Browns	VP/GM	Sashi Brown	Fired	John Dorsey	Brown was fired on December 7. Brown, who had served as the team's lawyer since 2013, was given the duties of general manager in 2016 despite no prior experience in football. He was considered responsible for trading away the high round draft picks that ended up being Carson Wentz and Deshaun Watson. In addition, he failed to follow through on a trade for Bengals backup quarterback A. J. McCarron, which was attributed to him simply failing to inform the league of the trade in time. Later that day, the Browns named former Kansas City Chiefs GM John Dorsey as their new GM. As general manager in Kansas City from 2013 to 2016, the Chiefs recorded a 43–21 (.672) record.

== Stadiums ==
=== Atlanta Falcons ===
The Atlanta Falcons played their first season at Mercedes-Benz Stadium, after playing in the Georgia Dome for the previous 25 seasons. The Georgia Dome was demolished by implosion on the morning of November 20, 2017.

=== Relocations ===
==== San Diego Chargers' relocation to Los Angeles ====
On January 12, 2017, the San Diego Chargers exercised their option to relocate to Los Angeles as the Los Angeles Chargers. They joined the Los Angeles Rams as tenants in their new stadium, SoFi Stadium in Inglewood, California when that stadium opened in 2020. Between 2017 and 2019, the Chargers played at the 30,000 seat StubHub Center in Carson, California, the smallest venue (in terms of number of seats) the league has used for a full season since 1956.

==== Oakland Raiders' relocation to Las Vegas ====
On January 19, 2017, the Oakland Raiders filed paperwork to relocate to Las Vegas, Nevada. The NFL officially approved the Raiders relocation to Las Vegas on March 27. Unlike the Chargers, the Raiders remained at the Oakland–Alameda County Coliseum through the 2018 and 2019 seasons while Allegiant Stadium was built, with the team moving to Nevada in 2020.

=== Attendance ===
The Los Angeles Rams, who had capped season ticket sales at 55,000 for the 2017 season, announced to have 60,128 spectators in the first home game on week 1. However, reports estimate that spectators only filled a third of the 93,607 seats of the Los Angeles Memorial Coliseum. The Los Angeles Chargers did not sell out their week 2 game at the StubHub Center, which was never expanded to 30,000 seats as originally stated and has typically had less than 26,000 fans in attendance. When the StubHub Center was at capacity, the majority of the fans present were supporters of the opposing team. Among the most notable examples was the October 1 game against Philadelphia Eagles being a mainly pro-Philadelphia crowd.

The San Francisco 49ers reported a Week 3 attendance total that exceeded the capacity of Levi's Stadium, even as wide swaths of empty seats were seen throughout the game. This followed similar sparse attendance for the 49ers' home opener. Even the Dallas Cowboys, a team whose fan base is among the largest in the United States, played their week 13 Thursday Night Football game in front of a half-empty AT&T Stadium. The lifting of the league's blackout policy was cited as one factor in the decline in ticket sales, as viewers would rather watch from the comfort of their homes, especially when weather conditions were less than ideal. At a Colts-Bills game held in blinding lake-effect snow on December 10, scalpers said they had not sold any tickets, an extreme rarity. A majority of television sets in all Western New York were tuned into some portion of the game, the highest viewership for a non-Super Bowl NFL game in the region since record-keeping began.

== New uniforms and patches ==
- Twenty-five teams transitioned to Nike's new uniform template. While most teams have just transitioned to it without any actual changes to the uniforms themselves, the New Orleans Saints, Cincinnati Bengals, and Los Angeles Rams uniforms are the most noticeable in it, fixing their collars in the process.
- The Detroit Lions unveiled new uniforms on April 13, 2017, eliminating all black elements from the uniform and logo for the first time since 2002. They added a new alternate uniform as well as a new Color Rush uniform.
- The Los Angeles Rams announced they would be switching their primary helmets to white and blue, similar to their Color Rush helmets. The team had fans vote on the color of their facemask, which would be white, and the design of their pants, which would be white with a blue stripe. The Rams also announced that they would explore a full rebrand in the near future.
- The Cincinnati Bengals will wear a patch to commemorate their 50th season.
- The San Francisco 49ers have altered their sleeve striping from 3 stripes to 2 stripes.
- The Seattle Seahawks dedicated their season to former Seahawks defensive tackle Cortez Kennedy, who died on May 23, 2017, by wearing a No. 96 decal on their helmets.
- The Pittsburgh Steelers will wear a patch to honor their former chairman, the late Dan Rooney, who died in April, at the age of 84. The patch will feature a shamrock, with Rooney's initials "DMR". The last time the Steelers wore a jersey patch was when Art Rooney died in 1988. They also donned a helmet decal to honor Chuck Noll, who died in 2014.
- The Dallas Cowboys will wear blue jerseys at home on a more regular basis, marking the first time the team has worn blue jerseys at home outside of Thanksgiving games since the NFL allowed teams to wear white jerseys at home in 1964. Despite the team's well-documented blue jersey "jinx", player preference as well as stronger retail sales of the navy blue jerseys over the white ones have prompted the team's decision. The blue jerseys will be worn for "high-profile" games at AT&T Stadium.
- The New York Giants wore a No. 14 decal on their helmets to honor Y. A. Tittle, who died on October 8, 2017. Later, they would wear a "JHT" patch from Week 10 onwards, in honor of Joan Tisch, the mother of Giants co-owner Steve Tisch, who died on November 2, 2017.
- The Buffalo Bills wore their all-red Color Rush uniforms when they faced the Indianapolis Colts in the aforementioned December 10 "snow game", the first team to do so on a Sunday, and the fourth team overall.
- All current and former Walter Payton NFL Man of the Year winners will wear a patch on their jerseys in perpetuity to acknowledge to recognize their outstanding contributions to the game and to their communities. Similarly, current nominees will wear a decal on their helmets for the rest of the season.
- The Atlanta Falcons wore their all red color rush jerseys with black numbers against the Saints on December 7, 2017. The numbers were a classic form of numbers. The alternate has the regular Falcon unlike the other alternate. The regular Atlanta Falcons' alternate is a black jersey, with a black helmet, and on the black helmet is the original Falcons logo.

== Media ==
=== Broadcast rights ===
==== Television ====
This was the fourth season under the league's broadcast contracts with its television partners. ESPN continued to air Monday Night Football, while ESPN2 simulcast ESPN Deportes' Spanish-language Monday Night Football broadcasts for the first nine weeks of the regular season; this served as filler programming for the channel until the start of its Monday-night college basketball broadcasts. Along with ESPN's Wild Card game on ABC, ESPN also simulcast the 2018 Pro Bowl on ABC, marking the return of the Pro Bowl to ABC for the first time since 2003.

The practice of "cross-flexing" (switching) Sunday afternoon games continued between CBS and Fox before or during the season, regardless of whether the visiting team is in the AFC (which CBS normally airs) or the NFC (which is normally carried by Fox). NBC continued to air Sunday Night Football, the annual Kickoff game, and the primetime Thanksgiving game, and broadcast Super Bowl LII. This also was the second and final year of the current Thursday Night Football contract with CBS, NBC, and NFL Network.

Although never explicitly announced, the league continued the moratorium on its blackout policy, ensuring all games would be televised in the market of their home teams regardless of ticket sales.

Because of fog and smoke obstruction, NBC was forced to televise large portions of two of their Sunday Night Football games from the skycam angle. Positive reception led NBC to experiment with increased usage of the angle as a primary view during its November 16 and December 14 Thursday Night Football telecasts. Because the angle distorts distance, the traditional sideline camera angle was used for close-yardage situations such as the red zone.

==== Digital ====
In over-the-top rights, Amazon Video acquired non-exclusive streaming rights to the 10 broadcast television Thursday Night Football games for $50 million. These streams are exclusive to paid Amazon Prime subscribers, in contrast to Twitter, which held the rights to the same package in 2016 and had made those streams free to most of the world.

Verizon Communications acquired international streaming rights to an NFL London Game between the Baltimore Ravens and Jacksonville Jaguars, in a similar arrangement to the 2015 game that was streamed by Yahoo!—which was acquired by Verizon in 2017. The game was streamed by Yahoo and other Verizon-owned platforms, including AOL, go90, and Complex. NFL Network remains a partner with Twitter for online content, including its new streaming news program NFL Blitz Live. The NFL also reached a deal with Facebook in September 2017 to offer video highlights following games, and streaming programs on the service's new Watch platform.

This was the final season of the NFL's exclusive mobile streaming contract with Verizon Wireless; the league intended to no longer have a single exclusive partner going forward, citing changes to viewing habits. On December 11, 2017, the NFL announced that it had agreed to a new 5-year, $2.5 billion digital rights agreement with Verizon, allowing it to stream in-market Sunday afternoon games, as well as all nationally televised games, across its mobile platforms. Unlike the previous deal, these streams are no longer exclusive to Verizon Wireless subscribers, as Verizon planned to leverage the divisions of its digital media subsidiary Oath (including the aforementioned Yahoo) as a platform to promote these streams to a larger audience, as well as other digital content and expanded highlights rights. As part of the agreement, Verizon began allowing access to its existing mobile streams to non-customers for the 2017–18 playoffs. As the new contract is non-exclusive, the NFL's television partners may negotiate to add the mobile streaming rights that were reserved to Verizon under the previous contract; NBC was the first to do so.

Two new international digital rights deals led to user criticism over their quality of service. In Canada, NFL Sunday Ticket shifted from distribution through television providers to the over-the-top provider DAZN, while in Europe, Deltatre took over European distribution of NFL Game Pass and launched new mobile apps. Both services faced criticism over their streaming quality, while Delatre's app faced criticism for having bugs and initially lacking features seen in the previous version of the platform. The Independent exposed that Deltatre had also issued an internal e-mail instructing its employees to give the apps 5-star reviews. DAZN subsequently announced that it would return to distributing Sunday Ticket through Canadian television providers in addition to their OTT service.

==== Radio ====
This was the final season of the NFL's existing national radio contract with Westwood One. Entravision (in the last year of a three-year deal) and ESPN Deportes Radio split Spanish broadcast rights.

=== Commercials ===
The league has sought to reduce the number of standard commercial breaks (media timeouts) on its telecasts from 21 to 16, four in each quarter, with each break extended by one additional 30-second commercial. One particular scenario the league sought to eliminate is the "double-up", in which a network cuts to a commercial after a scoring play, then airs the kickoff, and again goes to commercial before play from scrimmage resumes. Under the proposal, the league will allow networks to cut to commercial during instant replay reviews, which it had not been allowed to do before. Commissioner Roger Goodell stated that the changes are being made in an attempt to consolidate downtime between the actual game play so that there are fewer and less noticeable interruptions; he does not expect the changes to have an appreciable impact on the real-time length of a game, which currently clocks in at slightly over three hours.

The NFL has also, as a trial, lifted its ban on the broadcast of commercials for distilled spirits during its telecasts. However, they are subject to restrictions; a maximum of four liquor ads may be broadcast per-game, along with two per-pregame and postgame show. These ads may not contain football-related themes or target underage viewers, and must contain a "prominent social responsibility message".

=== Personnel changes ===
Tony Romo, who announced his retirement as a player on April 4, 2017, joined CBS, where he replaced Phil Simms as lead color commentator. Simms and Nate Burleson, who comes over from NFL Network, will replace Tony Gonzalez and Bart Scott on CBS's pregame show, The NFL Today. Jay Cutler also announced his retirement from professional football on May 5 and was slated to join Fox as a color analyst for its NFL coverage; he later rescinded that announcement in August and joined the Miami Dolphins. Gonzalez will move to Fox, where he will join Fox NFL Kickoff; upon his departure, Gonzalez stated that he wished to pursue opportunities closer to his home in California, rather than travel to New York weekly to appear on CBS. James Lofton, coming over from radio, will replace Solomon Wilcots as a CBS analyst.

On May 31, 2017, it was announced that Mike Tirico would replace Al Michaels on play-by-play on NBC's portion of the Thursday Night Football package, joined by Cris Collinsworth. The NFL had previously required this role to be filled by NBC's lead broadcast team of Michaels and Collinsworth; Tirico called a limited slate of games in 2016, including several NBC-broadcast games as a fill-in for Michaels (who voluntarily took several games off due to the increased number he was calling that season), and as part of a secondary team for selected games the TNF package. He will also succeed Bob Costas as the lead studio host for NBC. However, due to its proximity to the 2018 Winter Olympics (where he also succeeded Bob Costas as lead host), Tirico did not participate in NBC's Super Bowl LII coverage.

Beth Mowins became the second woman to call play-by-play for a national NFL broadcast, following Gayle Sierens in 1987, when she served as play-by-play announcer for the nightcap in ESPN's Week 1 Monday Night doubleheader, with Rex Ryan as her color commentator. In an unusual case of a broadcaster working for two networks in the same season, Mowins also called a regional game for CBS in Weeks 3, 15 and 17, with Jay Feely as her partner.

Also, this would end up being the last season for the Monday Night Football broadcast team of Sean McDonough, Jon Gruden, and Lisa Salters. Gruden would return to coaching the next year for the Oakland Raiders, while McDonough would return to doing College Football for ESPN, although Salters will still be on MNF. McDonough will be replaced by Joe Tessitore, who has done work for ESPN as a College Football announcer, like McDonough, while Jason Witten, who would end up retiring after this season, will replace Gruden, with Booger McFarland, being added as a field analyst.

=== Most watched regular season games ===
- DH = doubleheader; SNF = NBC Sunday Night Football

Rank	Date	Matchup				Network	Viewers (millions)	TV rating	Window	Significance
1	December 17, 4:25 ET	New England Patriots	27	Pittsburgh Steelers	24	CBS	26.9	15.2	Late DH^{[a]}	2016 AFC Championship rematch
2	November 23, 4:30 ET	Los Angeles Chargers	28	Dallas Cowboys	6	CBS	26.3	11.1	Thanksgiving	
3	September 17, 4:25 ET	Dallas Cowboys	17	Denver Broncos	42	Fox	26.0	14.3	Late DH^{[b]}	
4	November 23, 12:30 ET	Minnesota Vikings	30	Detroit Lions	23	Fox	24.7	11.4	Thanksgiving	Lions–Vikings rivalry
5	September 10, 8:30 ET	New York Giants	3	Dallas Cowboys	19	NBC	24.4	13.4	SNF	Cowboys–Giants rivalry
6	October 8, 4:25 ET	Green Bay Packers	35	Dallas Cowboys	31	Fox	23.9	13.6	Late DH^{[c]}	Cowboys–Packers rivalry 2016 NFC Divisional Round rematch
7	December 10, 4:25 ET	Philadelphia Eagles	43	Los Angeles Rams	35	Fox	23.8	13.7	Late DH^{[d]}	
8	December 24, 4:25 ET	Seattle Seahawks	21	Dallas Cowboys	12	Fox	23.0	12.2	Late DH^{[e]}	
9	September 10, 4:25 ET	Seattle Seahawks	9	Green Bay Packers	17	Fox	22.8	12.7	Late DH^{[f]}	Packers–Seahawks rivalry 2014 NFC Championship rematch
10	November 12, 4:25 ET	Dallas Cowboys	7	Atlanta Falcons	27	Fox	22.0	12.8	Late DH^{[g]}	

*Note – Late DH matchups listed in table are the matchups that were shown to the largest percentage of the market.

1. NE/PIT was shown in 91% of the markets during the late doubleheader time slot of CBS coverage.
2. DAL/DEN was shown in 81% of the markets during the late doubleheader time slot of Fox coverage.
3. GB/DAL was shown in 99% of the markets during the late doubleheader time slot of Fox coverage, with the Bay Area being the only market not airing the game.
4. PHI/LAR was shown in 90% of the markets during the late doubleheader time slot of Fox coverage.
5. SEA/DAL was shown in 89% of the markets during the late doubleheader time slot of Fox coverage.
6. SEA/GB was shown in 89% of the markets during the late doubleheader time slot of Fox coverage.
7. DAL/ATL was shown in 86% of the markets during the late doubleheader time slot of Fox coverage.
