= Chris Lindstrom =

American football player (born 1997)

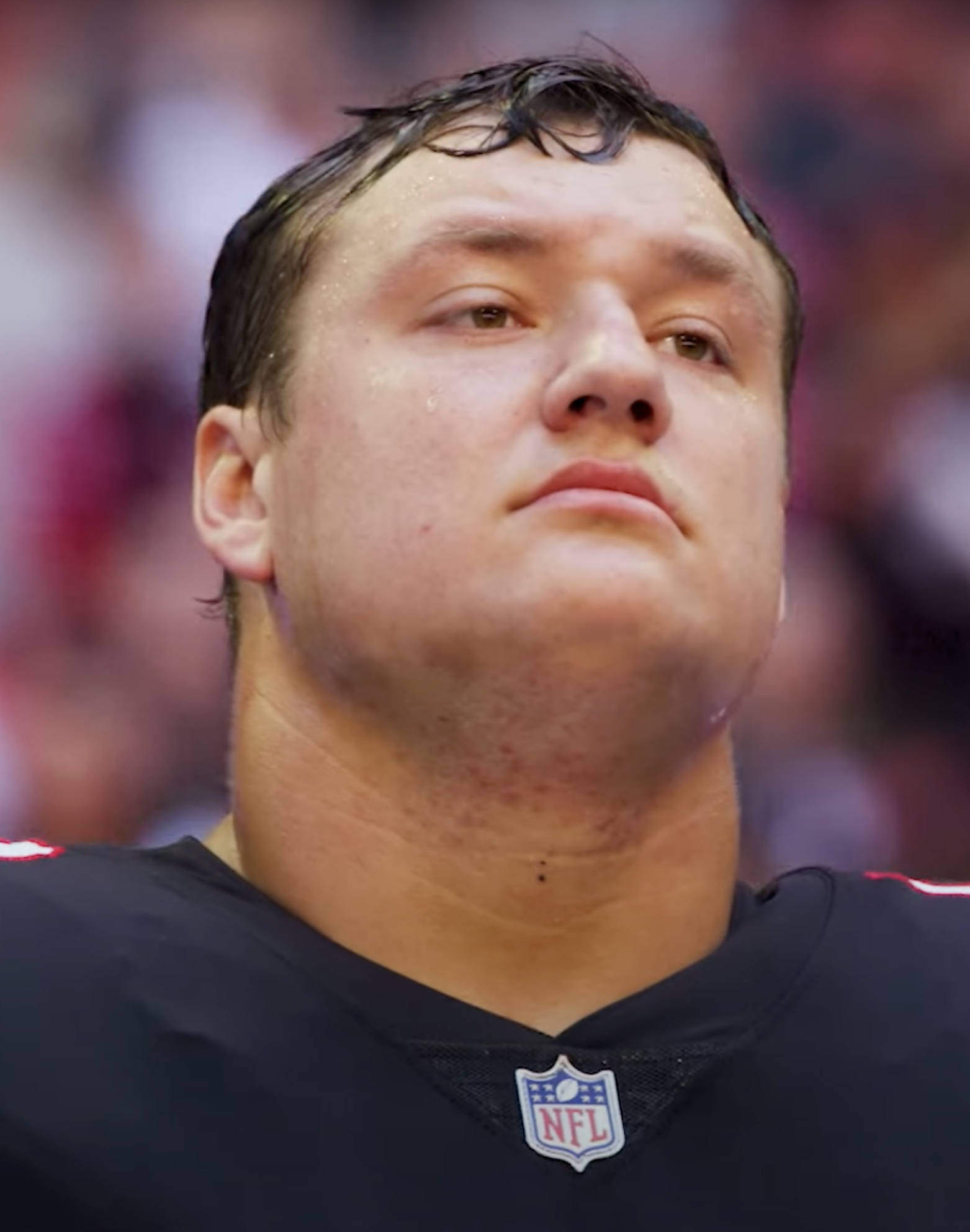
- Lindstrom in 2022

No. 63 – Atlanta Falcons
- Position: Guard
- Roster status: Active

Personal information
- Born: February 28, 1997 (age 29); Dudley, Massachusetts, U.S.
- Listed height: 6 ft 4 in (1.93 m)
- Listed weight: 310 lb (141 kg)

Career information
- High school: Shepherd Hill (Dudley)
- College: Boston College (2015–2018)
- NFL draft: 2019: 1st round, 14th overall pick

Career history
- Atlanta Falcons (2019–present)

Awards and highlights
- 4× Second-team All-Pro (2022–2025); 4× Pro Bowl (2022–2025); First-team All-ACC (2018); Second-team All-ACC (2017)

Career NFL statistics as of Week 5, 2026
- Games played: 110
- Games started: 110
- Stats at Pro Football Reference

Christopher Paul Lindstrom (born February 28, 1997) is an American professional football guard for the Atlanta Falcons of the National Football League (NFL). He played college football for the Boston College Eagles.

== Early life ==
Lindstrom attended Shepherd Hill Regional High School in Dudley, Massachusetts. He committed to Boston College to play college football.

== College career ==
Lindstrom played at Boston College from 2015 to 2018. During his career he started 49 of 52 games.

== Professional career ==
Pre-draft measurables
Height	Weight	Arm length	Hand span	Wingspan	40-yard dash	10-yard split	20-yard split	20-yard shuttle	Three-cone drill	Vertical jump	Broad jump	Bench press
6 ft 3 3/4 in (1.92 m)	308 lb (140 kg)	34 1/8 in (0.87 m)	9 1/2 in (0.24 m)	6 ft 8 1/8 in (2.04 m)	4.91 s	1.69 s	2.85 s	4.54 s	7.61 s	30.5 in (0.77 m)	9 ft 9 in (2.97 m)	25 reps
All values from NFL Combine

Lindstrom was selected by the Atlanta Falcons with the 14th overall pick in the first round of the 2019 NFL draft. He was named the Falcons starting right guard to start the season. However, in Week 1, Lindstrom suffered a broken foot and was placed on injured reserve on September 9, 2019. He was designated for return from injured reserve on December 2, 2019, and began practicing with the team again. He was activated on December 7, 2019, prior to Week 14.

Lindstrom started all 16 games in the 2020 season, and all 17 games in the 2021 season. In 2021, he allowed 0 sacks all season.

On May 2, 2022, the Falcons exercised the fifth year option on Lindstrom's contract, keeping him in Atlanta through the 2023 season.

On December 21, 2022, it was announced that he would be named to his first Pro Bowl. He was named to the AP All-Pro Second Team on January 13, 2023.

On March 13, 2023, Lindstrom signed a five-year, $105 million contract extension with the Falcons through the 2028 season. He was named to his second Pro Bowl and AP All-Pro Second Team at the conclusion of the 2023 NFL season.

== Personal life ==
Lindstrom's father, Chris, played at Boston University, and went on to play defensive end for the Chicago Blitz of the United States Football League in 1984. His uncles Eric Lindstrom and Dave Lindstrom also spent time in the NFL. His younger brother Alec also played for Boston College and was signed by the Dallas Cowboys as an undrafted free agent on April 30, 2022, shortly after the 2022 NFL draft.
