= Alec Lindstrom =

American football player (born 1998)

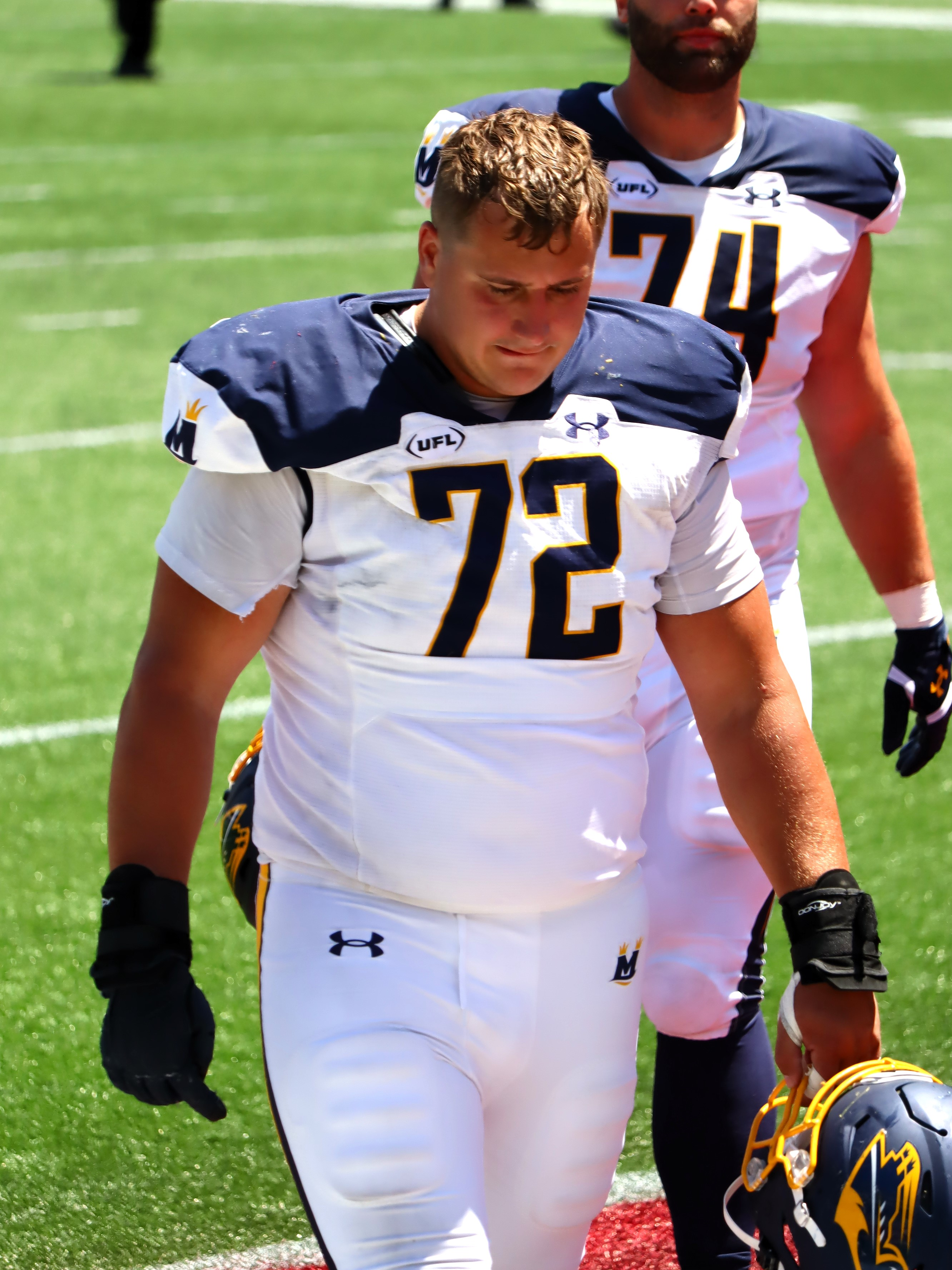
- Lindstrom with the Memphis Showboats in 2025

Profile
- Position: Center

Personal information
- Born: July 7, 1998 (age 28); Dudley, Massachusetts, U.S.
- Listed height: 6 ft 3 in (1.91 m)
- Listed weight: 300 lb (136 kg)

Career information
- High school: Shepherd Hill (Dudley, Massachusetts)
- College: Boston College (2017–2021)
- NFL draft: 2022: undrafted

Career history
- Dallas Cowboys (2022); Memphis Showboats (2024); Los Angeles Rams (2024)*; New York Jets (2024); Memphis Showboats (2025); New England Patriots (2025)*; Louisville Kings (2026)*
- * Offseason or practice squad member only

Awards and highlights
- 2× First-team All-ACC (2020, 2021); Third-team All-ACC (2019)

Career NFL statistics as of 2024
- Games played: 1
- Stats at Pro Football Reference

Alec Eric Lindstrom (born July 7, 1998) is an American professional football center. He played college football at Boston College and also played for the Memphis Showboats of the United Football League (UFL).

== Early life ==
Lindstrom grew up in Dudley, Massachusetts, and attended Shepherd Hill Regional High School. He committed to play college football at Boston College over an offer from UMass.

== College career ==
Lindstrom missed his freshman year due to injury and redshirted the season. He was named the Eagles' starting center going into his redshirt sophomore season and started all 13 of the team's games and was named third team All-Atlantic Coast Conference (ACC). He was named first team All-ACC as a redshirt junior after starting 11 games for the team. After considering entering the 2021 NFL Draft, Lindstrom decided to return to Boston College for a fifth season. He repeated as a first team All-ACC selection in 2021 and was a finalist for the Rimington Trophy.

== Professional career ==
Pre-draft measurables
Height	Weight	Arm length	Hand span	Wingspan	40-yard dash	10-yard split	20-yard split	20-yard shuttle	Three-cone drill	Vertical jump	Broad jump	Bench press
6 ft 3 3/8 in (1.91 m)	296 lb (134 kg)	32 5/8 in (0.83 m)	9 1/4 in (0.23 m)	6 ft 4 in (1.93 m)	5.18 s	1.74 s	2.98 s	4.66 s	7.50 s	29.0 in (0.74 m)	9 ft 3 in (2.82 m)	25 reps
All values from NFL Combine

=== Dallas Cowboys ===
On April 30, 2022, Lindstrom signed with the Dallas Cowboys as an undrafted free agent. On August 30, he was waived as part of final roster cuts and signed to the practice squad the following day. On September 17, he was elevated to the active roster from the practice squad. On November 15, Lindstrom was placed on the practice squad/injured list.

On January 23, 2023, Lindstrom signed a reserve/future contract with the Cowboys. On August 29, he was waived as part of final roster cuts.

=== Memphis Showboats (first stint) ===
Lindstrom signed with the Memphis Showboats of the UFL on January 24, 2024. His contract was terminated on August 6.

=== Los Angeles Rams ===
On August 6, 2024, Lindstrom signed with the Los Angeles Rams. On August 25, he was waived as part of final roster cuts.

=== New York Jets ===
On October 9, 2024, Lindstrom was signed to the New York Jets' practice squad, released from the practice squad on October 17, and then re-signed to the practice squad on October 23. On October 31, he was signed to the active roster. On November 16, he was released by the Jets.

=== Memphis Showboats (second stint) ===
On February 17, 2025, Lindstrom re-signed with the Showboats.

=== New England Patriots ===
On July 30, 2025, Lindstrom signed with the New England Patriots. On August 26, he was released as part of final roster cuts and re-signed to the practice squad the following day. On September 1, he was released from the practice squad.

=== Louisville Kings ===
On January 13, 2026, Lindstrom was selected by the Louisville Kings in the 2026 UFL Draft. He was released on March 19.

== Personal life ==
Lindstrom's older brother, Chris Lindstrom, plays for the Atlanta Falcons. His father, Chris Sr., was a defensive end at Boston University and played in the NFL and USFL. His uncle, Dave Lindstrom, played for the Kansas City Chiefs for eight seasons and another uncle, Eric, played in NFL Europe and the Canadian Football League.
