= Jerry Green (American football) =

American football player (1936–1994)

Profile
- Position: Halfback

Personal information
- Born: April 16, 1936; Atlanta, Georgia, U.S.
- Died: December 12, 1994 (aged 58); Dallas, Texas, U.S.
- Listed height: 6 ft 0 in (1.83 m)
- Listed weight: 190 lb (86 kg)

Career information
- High school: Henry Grady (GA)
- College: Georgia Tech

Career history
- 1960: Boston Patriots
- Stats at Pro Football Reference

Jerome Albert Green (April 16, 1936 – December 12, 1994) was an American football player.

Green was born in 1936 in Atlanta and attended Henry W. Grady High School in that city. He then played college football at Georgia Tech from 1955 to 1958.

Green played professional football for the 1960 Boston Patriots during the inaugural season of the American Football League (AFL). He appeared in two games for the Patriots and caught three passes for 52 yards.

Green died in 1994 at age 58 at the Baylor University Medical Center in Dallas.
