= Shepherd Hill Regional High School =

Coordinates: 42°3′13″N 71°55′9″W

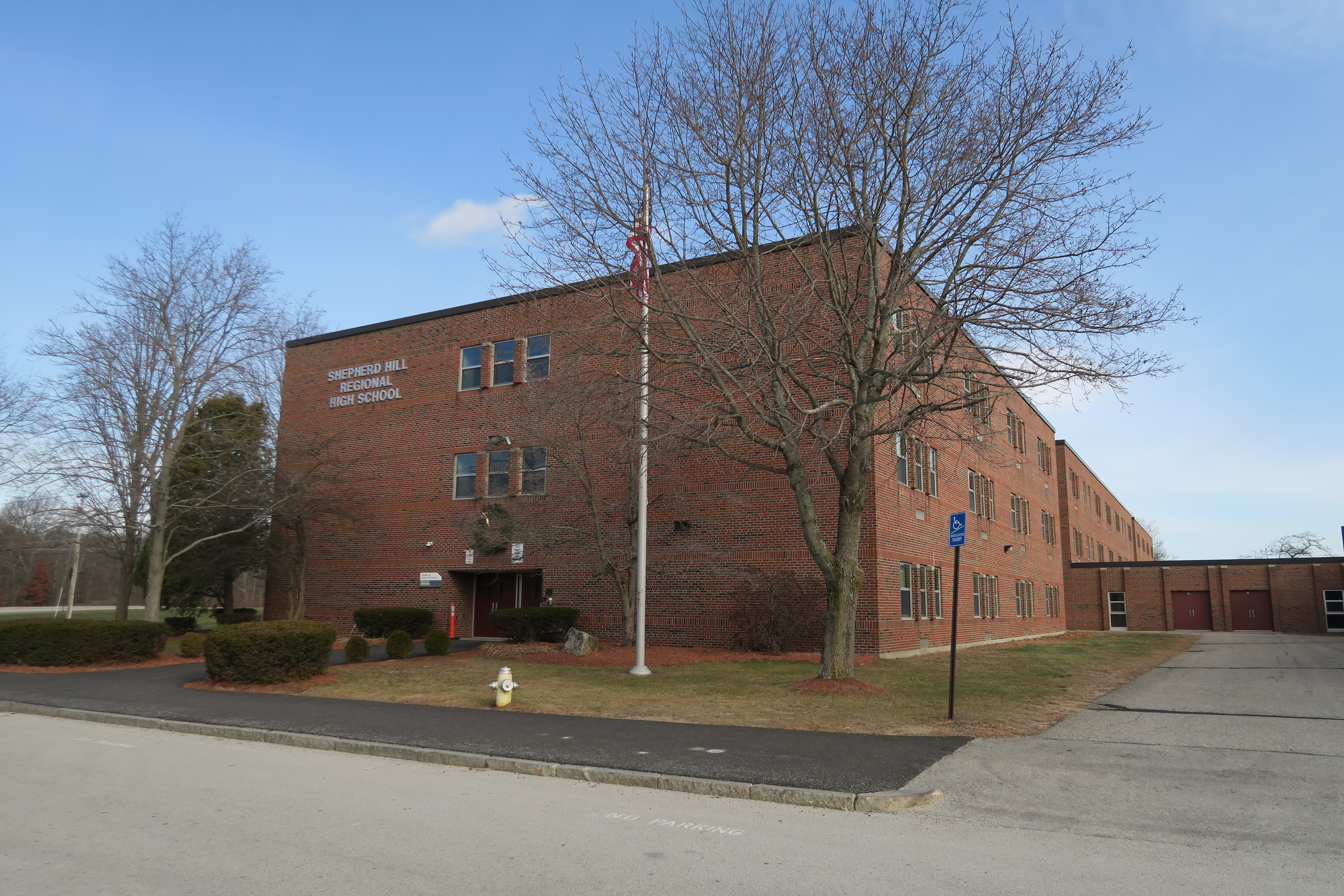

Location
- 68 Dudley Oxford Road; Dudley, Massachusetts 01571; United States

Information
- Type: Public; High School; Open enrollment
- Established: 1973; 53 years ago
- Principal: Darren C. Elwell
- Staff: 64.92 (FTE)
- Enrollment: 937 (2023–2024)
- Student to teacher ratio: 14.43
- Colors: Maroon and gold
- Athletics conference: Midland Wachusett League
- Mascot: fighting Ram
- Communities served: Dudley, Charlton
- Website: https://shrhs.dcrsd.org/

Shepherd Hill Regional High School is located in Dudley, Massachusetts, United States. It is a regional high school covering the towns of Dudley and Charlton. The school is part of the Dudley-Charlton Regional School District. The principal is Darren C. Elwell. Shepherd Hill had 923 students in 2023.

== History ==
Shepherd Hill was established in 1973. The school formerly included grades 7–12, but in 2000 Dudley and Charlton opened separate middle schools and the school is now restricted to grades 9–12.

== Awards ==
On January 18, 1999 the school was selected by U.S. News & World Report as one of ninety-six 'Outstanding American high schools' and the school was congratulated in the Senate of the Commonwealth of Massachusetts.

== Performing arts ==
Shepherd Hill has a highly decorated Marching Band, Winter Percussion, and Winter Guard. The Shepherd Hill Band programs hold near “Dynasty” status among New England music programs, winning numerous titles in MICCA, NESBA, and USBands competitions across the northeast. Past band directors include original director Greg Stewart, and Shepherd Hill band legends Cindy Snow, James Flynn, and Dave Macuga.

In addition, Shepherd Hill has three competitive show choirs: the mixed-gender "Fantasy", the all-female "Illusion", and the all-male "Testostertones". The school is recognized as one of the first to have a show choir in New England, having established the group in 1984. The program also hosts an annual competition the first weekend in February.

== Notable alumni ==
- Alec Lindstrom, NFL player
- Chris Lindstrom, NFL Player
- Sean McKeon, NFL player
