= Tony Discenzo =

American football player (1936–2007)

No. 76, 75
- Positions: Offensive tackle, punter, placekicker

Personal information
- Born: February 4, 1936; Cleveland, Ohio, U.S.
- Died: February 11, 2007 (aged 71); Cleveland, Ohio, U.S.
- Listed height: 6 ft 5 in (1.96 m)
- Listed weight: 240 lb (109 kg)

Career information
- High school: Cathedral Latin (Cleveland)
- College: Michigan State

Career history
- Boston Patriots (1960); Buffalo Bills (1960); Cleveland Bulldogs (1961–1962); Oakland Raiders (1963)*; Cleveland/Canton Bulldogs (1963–1964)
- * Offseason or practice squad member only

Career AFL statistics
- Games played: 8
- Stats at Pro Football Reference

Anthony Nicholas Discenzo Jr. (February 4, 1936 – February 11, 2007) was an American professional football offensive tackle who played one season in the American Football League (AFL) with the Boston Patriots and Buffalo Bills. He played college football at Michigan State University.

== Early life and college ==
Anthony Nicholas Discenzo Jr. was born on February 4, 1936, in Cleveland, Ohio. He attended Cathedral Latin High School in Cleveland.

Discenzo played college football for the Michigan State Spartans of Michigan State University.

== Professional career ==
Discenzo signed with the Boston Patriots of the American Football League (AFL) on March 8, 1960. He played in three games, all starts, for the Patriots during the AFL's inaugural 1960 season before being released on October 19, 1960.

Discenzo was signed by the Buffalo Bills of the AFL on November 10, 1960. He appeared in five games, starting two, for the Bills before being released on December 9, 1960.

Discenzo played for the Cleveland Bulldogs of the United Football League in 1961, punting 31 times for 1,036 yards while also converting 23 extra points and two field goals. He re-signed with the Bulldogs on July 27, 1962. During the 1962 season, he punted 40 times for a 34.8 yard average while scoring 19 extra points and four field goals.

Discenzo signed with the AFL's Oakland Raiders on March 30, 1963. He was later released on July 26, 1963.

Discenzo returned to the Bulldogs in 1963, converting 21 extra points and two field goals. He made one extra point for the newly-renamed Canton Bulldogs in 1964.

== Personal life ==
Discenzo died on February 11, 2007, in Cleveland, Ohio.
