= Greg Liter =

American football player (born 1963)

No. 99, 77
- Position: Defensive end

Personal information
- Born: December 31, 1963 (age 62); Wausau, Wisconsin, U.S.
- Listed height: 6 ft 6 in (1.98 m)
- Listed weight: 275 lb (125 kg)

Career information
- High school: Mosinee
- College: Iowa State
- NFL draft: 1987: undrafted

Career history
- San Francisco 49ers (1987); Philadelphia Eagles (1987)

Awards and highlights
- Second-team All-Big Eight (1986)
- Stats at Pro Football Reference

Greg Liter (born December 31, 1963) is an American former football defensive end. He played college football for Iowa State from 1983 to 1986. He also played in three games in the National Football League (NFL) for the Philadelphia Eagles and San Francisco 49ers during the 1987 season.

== Early life ==
Liter was born in 1963 at Wausau, Wisconsin. He attended Mosinee High School in Mosinee, Wisconsin. His high school coach, Bob Coy, said in 1981 that the 6'6", 235-pound Liter had as much major college potential as any player he had coached. Liter added: "He's a legitimate 4.9 in the 40-yard dash and has real quick feet. As further evidence of his speed, he's the center-fielder on our baseball team. In fact, some college people project him as a tight end."

== College football ==
Liter played college football as a defensive end for Iowa State from 1983 to 1986. He tallied 202 total tackles, including 28 tackles for loss, at Iowa State. As a senior in 1986, he tallied 17 tackles against No. 5 Nebraska and 12 tackles against No. 3 Oklahoma. At the end of his senior season, he received honorable mention from the Associated Press on the 1986 All-America college football team. He also played in the 1986 Blue-Gray game.

== Professional football ==
Liter was scouted by multiple professional football teams, but he was ultimately not selected in the NFL draft. He signed as a free agent with the San Francisco 49ers in May 1987. He played in one game for the 49ers. He was then signed by the Philadelphia Eagles and played in two games for the Eagles. He was released in October 1987.
