= Michael LeBlanc (American football) =

American football player (born 1998)

No. 40
- Position: Running back

Personal information
- Born: May 5, 1962; Missouri City, Texas, U.S.
- Died: December 16, 2025 (aged 63); Texas, U.S.
- Listed height: 5 ft 11 in (1.80 m)
- Listed weight: 199 lb (90 kg)

Career information
- High school: Willowridge (Houston, Texas)
- College: Stephen F. Austin (1981–1984)
- NFL draft: 1985: undrafted

Career history
- New England Patriots (1985–1986)*; Winnipeg Blue Bombers (1987)*; Dallas Cowboys (1987)*; New England Patriots (1987); Winnipeg Blue Bombers (1988); Dallas Cowboys (1988)*
- * Offseason or practice squad member only
- Stats at Pro Football Reference

Michael Keith LeBlanc (May 5, 1962 – December 16, 2025) was an American professional football running back who played for the New England Patriots of the National Football League (NFL). He played college football at Stephen F. Austin.

== Early life ==
Michael Keith LeBlanc was born on May 5, 1962, in Missouri City, Texas. He attended Willowridge High School in Houston, Texas.

LeBlanc was a four-year letterman for the Stephen F. Austin Lumberjacks of Stephen F. Austin State University from 1981 to 1984. He rushed 80 times for 484 yards and two touchdowns in 1983, and 100 times for 559 yards and one touchdown in 1984.

== Professional career ==
After going undrafted in the 1985 NFL draft, LeBlanc signed with the New England Patriots on May 16, 1985. He was released on August 19, 1985, after the second preseason game. He signed with the Patriots again on May 20, 1986, but was released again on August 25, 1986, after the fourth (of five) preseason games.

LeBlanc was signed by the Winnipeg Blue Bombers of the Canadian Football League (CFL) on March 20, 1987. He was released on June 20, 1987, before the start of the regular season. He then signed with the Dallas Cowboys some time later but was released on August 6, 1987, a week before the first preseason game.

On September 23, 1987, LeBlanc signed with the Patriots during the 1987 NFL players strike. In a Week 5 game against the Buffalo Bills on October 11, he rushed 35 times for 146 yards. This was the most carries by a Patriot since Jim Nance in 1966. LeBlanc was named the Pro Football Weekly NFL Offensive Player of the Week for Week 5. He played in all three strike games for New England. Unlike most other replacement players, LeBlanc stayed on with the Patriots after the strike ended. He played in one non-strike game, on October 25, and was then released on October 28. He played in four games, starting two, overall during the 1987 season, totaling 49 rushing attempts for 170 yards (3.5 yard average) and one touchdown, two receptions for three yards on three targets, and two kick returns for 31 yards.

LeBlanc signed with the Blue Bombers again in 1988. He was released again on July 8, 1988, before playing in any games. He then signed with the Cowboys for the second time but was soon released later that month on July 22.

== Personal life ==
LeBlanc was later a schoolteacher in Texas. He died on December 16, 2025, in Texas.
