= Jack Davis (guard, born 1932) =

American gridiron football player (1932–2013)

No. 65
- Position: Guard

Personal information
- Born: March 12, 1932; Braddock, Pennsylvania
- Died: January 1, 2013 (aged 80); Palm Harbor, Florida
- Listed height: 6 ft 0 in (1.83 m)
- Listed weight: 226 lb (103 kg)

Career information
- High school: Gonzaga Preparatory (WA); Bladensburg (MD)
- College: Maryland

Career history
- Hamilton Tiger-Cats (1957–1958); Boston Patriots (1960)

Awards and highlights
- Grey Cup champion (1957)

Career statistics
- Games played: 14
- Stats at Pro Football Reference

John James Davis (March 12, 1932 – January 1, 2013) was an American professional football guard who played for the Boston Patriots of the American Football League. He played college football at the University of Maryland. He also had played in the Canadian Football League for the Hamilton Tiger-Cats.

Davis died on January 1, 2013.
