= Mike Long (American football) =

American football player (born 1938)

No. 87
- Position: End

Personal information
- Born: October 29, 1938 (age 88)
- Listed height: 6 ft 0 in (1.83 m)
- Listed weight: 188 lb (85 kg)

Career information
- High school: Marlboro (MA)
- College: Brandeis

Career history
- Boston Patriots (1960)
- Stats at Pro Football Reference

Michael Stanford Long (born October 29, 1938) is an American former professional football player who was an end with the Boston Patriots of the American Football League (AFL). He played college football for the Brandeis Judges.
