= Bill Larson (fullback) =

American football player (1938–2015)

No. 32
- Position: Fullback

Personal information
- Born: July 26, 1938; Rockford, Illinois
- Died: September 19, 2015 (aged 77); Rockton, Illinois
- Listed height: 5 ft 10 in (1.78 m)
- Listed weight: 190 lb (86 kg)

Career information
- High school: Hononegah (IL)
- College: Illinois Wesleyan

Career history
- Boston Patriots (1960)

Career statistics
- Games played: 1
- Stats at Pro Football Reference

William E. Larson (July 26, 1938 – September 19, 2015) was an American football player who played with the Boston Patriots. He played college football at Illinois Wesleyan University.
