= Chris Lindstrom (defensive lineman) =

American football player (born 1960)

No. 71, 91, 63
- Position: Defensive lineman

Personal information
- Born: August 3, 1960 (age 66); Weymouth, Massachusetts, U.S.
- Listed height: 6 ft 7 in (2.01 m)
- Listed weight: 260 lb (118 kg)

Career information
- High school: Weymouth South
- College: Boston University
- NFL draft: 1982: 8th round, 205th overall pick

Career history
- St. Louis Cardinals (1982)*; Baltimore Colts (1983)*; Cincinnati Bengals (1983); Hamilton Tiger-Cats (1983)*; San Francisco 49ers (1983); Houston Oilers (1984)*; Chicago Blitz (1984); Tampa Bay Buccaneers (1985); Kansas City Chiefs (1987); New York Jets (1988)*
- * Offseason or practice squad member only
- Stats at Pro Football Reference

Christopher Andrew Lindstrom (born August 3, 1960) is an American former professional football defensive lineman who played in the National Football League (NFL) with the Cincinnati Bengals, San Francisco 49ers, Tampa Bay Buccaneers, and Kansas City Chiefs. He played college football for the Boston University Terriers and was selected by the St. Louis Cardinals in the eighth round of the 1982 NFL draft.

== Early life ==
Christopher Andrew Lindstrom was born on August 3, 1960, in Weymouth, Massachusetts. He attended Weymouth South High School.

== College career ==
Lindstrom enrolled at Boston University to play college football for the Boston University Terriers. He was a member of the team his freshman year in 1978 but did not earn a varsity letter. He was a three-year letterman from 1979 to 1981. The Patriot Ledger reported that scouts believed Lindstrom could be a defensive end in the NFL due to his quickness. He earned second-team All-Yankee Conference honors as a senior in 1981. Lindstrom recorded college career totals of 110 tackles and 11 sacks. He was inducted into the Boston University Athletic Hall of Fame in 2001.

== Professional career ==
Lindstrom was selected by the St. Louis Cardinals in the eighth round, with the 205th overall pick, of the 1982 NFL draft. He signed with the team on June 16. On July 23, it was reported that Lindstrom had voluntarily left the team during training camp for personal reasons. He spend the 1982 season as a defensive line coach at Colby College. He resolved his personal problems and requested his release from the Cardinals but they would not release him. After spending time on the team's inactive list, Lindstrom was finally waived by St. Louis in March 1983.

In March 1983, Lindstrom was claimed off waivers by the Baltimore Colts. He competed for a defensive end job with the Colts. He was released on August 22, 1983, after the third game of the 1983 preseason.

Lindstrom signed with the Cincinnati Bengals on September 6, 1983, after Ross Browner was suspended three games for drug use. Lindstrom played in one game for the Bengals as a reserve nose tackle. He was released on September 27, 1983, after Browner returned from suspension.

On October 13, 1983, it was reported that Lindstrom had signed a 21-day trial with the Hamilton Tiger-Cats of the Canadian Football League. However, he voluntarily left the team after a week and never played for Hamilton. Lindstrom later stated "I was real disappointed with the equipment. It wasn't pro football. In fact, it wasn't even college football". He said the shoulder pads looked like they were from 1920 and the pants had ruffles that looked like "the inside of a casket."

After Lawrence Pillers suffered a minor knee injury in the regular season finale, the San Francisco 49ers signed Lindstrom as insurance on December 21, 1983. He ended up taking the roster spot of Dwight Clark after Clark was placed on injured reserve. Lindstrom appeared in one playoff game for the 49ers on the defensive extra point team.

Lindstrom signed with the Chicago Blitz of the United States Football League in February 1984. The 49ers sued the Blitz for breach of contract, stating that Lindstrom had one more year with the 49ers. Lindstrom took the 49ers to court and said that he had only signed with them for the postseason. The judge issued a restraining order against the 49ers. On April 6, Lindstrom was claimed off procedural waivers by the Houston Oilers. However, he never reported to them. He instead spent the 1983 USFL season with the Blitz, appearing in eight games.

Lindstrom was signed by the Tampa Bay Buccaneers on March 23, 1985. In July 1985, it was reported that Lindstrom had been attending Harvard University for the past three years as a part-time graduate student. He played in 15 games, starting two, at defensive end for the Buccaneers during the 1985 season while posting six tackles and one fumble recovery. He voluntary left the team during training camp on July 30, 1986, apparently retiring from pro football.

On September 24, 1987, Lindstrom signed with the Kansas City Chiefs during the 1987 NFL players strike. He started all three strike games for Kansas City. He was released on October 20, 1987, after the strike ended.

Lindstrom was signed by the New York Jets on April 15, 1988. He was released on August 8 after the first game of the 1988 preseason.

== Personal life ==
Lindstrom's brother, Dave, also played in the NFL. Chris' sons, Alec and Chris, also played in the NFL.
