= Chuck Leo =

American football player (1934–2010)

No. 63, 64
- Position: Guard

Personal information
- Born: August 29, 1934; Niagara Falls, New York
- Died: October 7, 2010 (aged 76); Rochester, New York

Career information
- High school: Bishop Duffy (NY)
- College: Indiana

Career history
- Boston Patriots (1960–1962); Buffalo Bills (1963)

Awards and highlights
- AFL All-Star: 1961

Career statistics
- Games played: 38
- Stats at Pro Football Reference

Charles Leo (August 29, 1934 – October 7, 2010) was an American football offensive lineman who played for the American Football League's Boston Patriots from 1960 to 1962, and the AFL's Buffalo Bills in 1963. He was an AFL All-Star in 1961.

He showed up to the training camp after being signed by a free agent in 1960 by the Boston Patriots. He was kept on the team by coach Lou Saban and started as a guard on the offensive line. In his rookie season as a Patriot, he was named second all-pro. Always striving to do better after being drafted for a short career in the United States Army, he was named first all-pro in 1961. In 1962, he played four games before he severely tore his hamstring in a non-football related accident. Unable to get the injury to heal so he could return to his prior playing level, he did not return to the Patriots offensive line and was let go by the team. In 1963, his coach in Boston, Lou Saban, again invited him to try out for his team, only it was for the Buffalo Bills not the Boston Patriots. Even though coach Lou and he got along very well, he was cut by the coach before the season started officially ending his career.

He went on to sell heavy-duty construction equipment in Rochester, New York, for 35 years.

== See also ==
- Other American Football League players
