= Walt Livingston =

American football player (born 1934)

No. 24
- Position: Halfback

Personal information
- Born: September 12, 1934 (age 92); Ravenna, Ohio, U.S.
- Listed height: 6 ft 0 in (1.83 m)
- Listed weight: 185 lb (84 kg)

Career information
- High school: Ravenna
- College: Heidelberg (OH)
- NFL draft: 1957: 20th round, 234th overall pick

Career history
- Baltimore Colts (1957)*; Boston Patriots (1960)
- * Offseason or practice squad member only

Career AFL statistics
- Rushing yards: 16
- Rushing average: 1.6
- Touchdowns: 1
- Stats at Pro Football Reference

Walter Livingston (born September 12, 1934) is an American former professional football player who was a halfback with the Boston Patriots of the American Football League (AFL). He played college football at Heidelberg University.
