= Bob Lee (guard) =

American football player (1935–2017)

No. 60
- Position: Guard

Personal information
- Born: July 4, 1935
- Died: March 4, 2017 (aged 81); Columbia, Missouri, U.S.
- Listed height: 6 ft 1 in (1.85 m)
- Listed weight: 241 lb (109 kg)

Career information
- High school: Hickman
- College: Missouri

Career history
- Boston Patriots (1960)
- Stats at Pro Football Reference

Robert Edward Lee (July 4, 1935 – March 4, 2017) was an American football player who played with the Boston Patriots. He played college football at the University of Missouri. After college, Lee went into the American Football League for the 1960 season with the Patriots. He died on March 4, 2017, at the age of 81.
