= Dave Lindstrom =

American football player (born 1954)

Personal details
- Born: David Alan Lindstrom; November 16, 1954 (age 71) Cambridge, Massachusetts, U.S.
- Party: Republican
- Education: Boston University (BA)
- Football career

No. 71
- Position: Defensive end

Personal information
- Listed height: 6 ft 6 in (1.98 m)
- Listed weight: 255 lb (116 kg)

Career information
- High school: Weymouth (MA)
- College: Boston University (1972–1976)
- NFL draft: 1977: 6th round, 146th overall pick

Career history
- Kansas City Chiefs (1978–1985)

Career NFL statistics
- Games played-started: 118-30
- Sacks: 7.5
- Fumble recoveries: 1
- Stats at Pro Football Reference

David Alan Lindstrom (born November 16, 1954) is an American former professional football player who was a defensive end for eight seasons with the Kansas City Chiefs of the National Football League (NFL) from 1978 to 1986. He played college football for the Boston University Terriers and was selected 146th overall by the San Diego Chargers in the 1977 NFL draft. Lindstrom was inducted into both the Boston University Hall of Fame and Massachusetts High School Hall of Fame in 1993.

Lindstrom served as the chairman of the Overland Park Visitors and Convention Bureau as well as a Kansas City Chiefs Ambassador. He has owned four Burger King restaurants in the Kansas City area. Lindstrom also serves as board chairman for the Kansas Turnpike Authority and as a member of Johnson County Community College’s Board of Trustees.

A Johnson County, Kansas resident since 1979, Lindstrom and Mary, his wife of 40 years, are parents of Halee and Adrienne. His brother, Chris Lindstrom, also played in the NFL.

== 2020 U.S. Senate campaign ==
Lindstrom launched his bid for the Republican nomination for the United States Senate with an event on June 27, 2019, at Goodland, Kansas in Kansas' northwestern corner (four-term GOP Sen. Pat Roberts is not seeking re-election in 2020). Entering the Senate race, Lindstrom stated he's concerned about what he sees as a growing embrace of socialism by people in Washington: “People are making promises with other people's money and resources that they cannot keep, that they understand are not sustainable — that will create an environment in this country, of one of entitlement, as opposed to hard work,” he said during an Associated Press interview, “That's what I mean when I talk about socialism.” He ended up getting 4th place in the votes during the primaries.

Party political offices
| Preceded by Gary Sherrer | Republican nominee for Lieutenant Governor of Kansas; 2002 | Succeeded by Susan Wagle |
