= 1993 Los Angeles Rams season =

NFL team season

- Owner: Georgia Frontiere
- General manager: John Shaw
- Head coach: Chuck Knox
- Offensive coordinator: Ernie Zampese
- Defensive coordinator: George Dyer
- Home stadium: Anaheim Stadium

Results
- Record: 5–11
- Division place: 4th NFC West
- Playoffs: Did not qualify
- All-Pros: Jerome Bettis, RB
- Pro Bowlers: Jerome Bettis, RB; Sean Gilbert, DT
- Team MVP: Jerome Bettis
- Team ROY: Jerome Bettis

Uniform
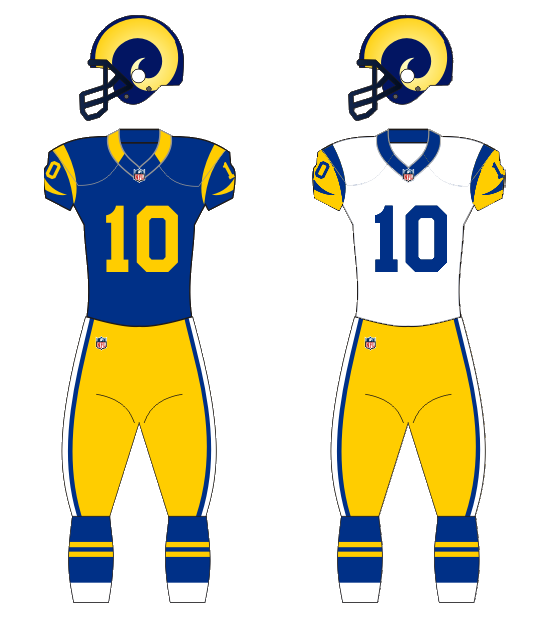

The 1993 Los Angeles Rams season was the franchise's 56th season in the National Football League (NFL) and the 48th in Los Angeles.

The Rams looked to improve on their 6–10 record from 1992 and make the playoffs for the first time since 1989. However, the season started off horribly, as the Rams were stomped 36–6 by the Packers in Green Bay in their first game. The Rams, however, rebounded with a 27–0 win over the Pittsburgh Steelers at home. This was followed by a 20–10 loss to the New York Giants and a 28–13 win over the Houston Oilers in Houston. After the win over Houston, the Rams dipped even further, losing their next 5 games to the New Orleans Saints at home (37–6), the Atlanta Falcons in Atlanta (30–24), the Detroit Lions at home (16–13), the arch-rival 49ers in San Francisco (40–17), and the Falcons at home (13–0), to drop to 2–7. After a surprising win over the Washington Redskins at home, the Rams were walloped in their next two games by the 49ers and Cardinals. This assured them of a fourth consecutive losing season and eliminated them from division contention, yet a win over the Saints in New Orleans kept the Rams in the playoff race until a 15–3 loss to the Bengals in Cincinnati eliminated the team from the playoffs for a fourth straight season. This was followed by an embarrassing 42–14 loss at home to the Cleveland Browns and a 20–6 win over the Bears at home.

Ultimately, the Rams finished with a hapless 5–11 record, one win worse than 1992. Worse, the Rams lost ten games by double-digit margins, the first time that had ever happened in franchise history.

To further compound matters, speculation began to mount that the team might relocate to Baltimore. Reports surfaced as the Rams prepared to play the 49ers in San Francisco. The rumors, and further erosion of fan support, exacerbated a 40–17 defeat—their sixth consecutive defeat by San Francisco—and a 2–6 start. The Rams' most recent start of similar quality—or lack thereof—came in 1965, when the Rams played their home games at the L. A. Coliseum and the team was coached by Harland Svare.

However, not all of the developments regarding the Rams constituted a lost season. In fact, early-season routs of the Oilers and Steelers, including the 27–0 shutout of Pittsburgh at Anaheim Stadium, proved to be rare highlights. Jerome Bettis enjoyed a spectacular rookie year and would go on to have a Hall of Fame career.

== Offseason ==
Additions	Subtractions
LB Shane Conlan (Bills)	LB Kevin Greene (Steelers)
DE Tony Woods (Seahawks)	LB Larry Kelm (49ers)
LB Henry Rolling (Chargers)	LB Fred Strickland (Vikings)
WR Ernie Jones (Cardinals)	T Gerald Perry (Raiders)
G Leo Goeas (Chargers)	LB Scott Stephen (Cardinals)
	WR Aaron Cox (Colts)
	LB Paul Butcher (Colts)
	G Joe Milinichik (Chargers)

=== 1993 Draft Class ===
1993 Los Angeles Rams draft
Round	Pick	Player	Position	College	Notes
1	10	Jerome Bettis * ^{†}	Running back	Notre Dame	
2	39	Troy Drayton	Tight end	Penn State	
3	73	Russell White	Running back	California	
5	122	Sean LaChapelle	Wide receiver	UCLA	
5	127	Chuck Belin	Guard	Wisconsin	
6	149	Deral Boykin	Defensive back	Louisville	
7	179	Brad Fichtel	Center	Eastern Illinois	
8	206	Jeff Buffaloe	Punter	Memphis	
8	209	Maa Tanuvasa	Defensive end	Hawaii	
Made roster † Pro Football Hall of Fame * Made at least one Pro Bowl during career

=== Undrafted free agents ===
1993 undrafted free agents of note
Player	Position	College
Jamie Martin	Quarterback	Weber State

== Personnel ==
=== Staff ===
1993 Los Angeles Rams staff
Front office: Owner/President – Georgia Frontiere; Executive Vice President – John Shaw; Senior Vice President – Jay Zygmunt; Administrator of Football Operations – Jack Faulkner; Director of Player Personnel – John Becker; Head coaches: Vice-president/head coach – Chuck Knox; Assistant head coach/safeties – Joe Vitt; Offensive coaches: Offensive coordinator – Ernie Zampese; Quarterbacks – Ted Tollner; Running backs – Chick Harris; Wide receivers – Milt Jackson; Tight ends – Howard Tippett; Offensive line – Jim Erkenbeck; Offensive assistant – Chuck Knox Jr.; Offensive assistant – Mike Martz	Defensive coaches: Defensive coordinator/defensive line – George Dyer; Linebackers – Dick Selcer; Defensive backs – Rod Perry; Defensive Assistant – Greg Gaines; Special teams coaches: Special Teams – Howard Tippett; Strength and conditioning: Strength and Conditioning – Chris Clausen

=== Roster ===
1993 Los Angeles Rams roster
Quarterbacks (QB): 11 Jim Everett; 8 Jamie Martin; 12 T. J. Rubley; Running backs (RB): 36 Jerome Bettis; 43 Cleveland Gary; 30 Howard Griffith KR; 38 David Lang; 34 Tim Lester; 44 Russell White KR; Wide receivers (WR): 83 Flipper Anderson; 89 Richard Buchanan PR; 80 Henry Ellard; 86 Ernie Jones; 45 Sean LaChapelle; Tight ends (TE): 87 Kelly Blackwell; 88 Pat Carter; 84 Troy Drayton; 82 Travis McNeal	Offensive linemen (OL): 77 Darryl Ashmore T; 71 Chuck Belin G; 61 Bern Brostek C; 51 Blair Bush; 75 Irv Eatman T; 68 Brad Fichtel C; 79 Leo Goeas G; 66 Tom Newberry G; 69 Jeff Pahukoa G; 72 Kevin Robbins T; Defensive linemen (DL): 96 Marc Boutte DT; 93 Jeff Esters DT; 90 Sean Gilbert DT; 97 Gerald Robinson DE; 92 David Rocker DT; 60 Fred Stokes DE; 91 Tony Woods DE	Linebackers (LB): 54 Brett Collins OLB; 56 Shane Conlan MLB; 57 Thomas Homco MLB; 53 Chris Martin OLB; 58 Roman Phifer OLB; 59 Henry Rolling OLB; 55 Leon White OLB; Defensive backs (DB): 21 Deral Boykin FS/KR; 29 Dexter Davis CB; 42 Courtney Griffin CB/S; 24 Wymon Henderson CB; 31 Steve Israel CB/KR; 26 Anthony Newman FS; 27 Mitchell Price CB/KR; 23 Michael Stewart SS; 37 Pat Terrell SS; Special teams (ST): 5 Sean Landeta P; 10 Tony Zendejas K	Practice squad: -- Frank Boudreaux DT; 52 Paul Liggett MLB; 53 active, 9 inactive, 2 practice squad Reserve: 28 Robert Bailey CB (IR); -- Phillip Bobo WR (IR); 20 Darryl Henley; 81 Todd Kinchen (IR); 64 Keith Loneker G (IR); 41 Todd Lyght CB (IR); 78 Jackie Slater T (IR); 99 Maa Tanuvasa DT (IR); 76 Robert Young DE (IR); Rookies in italics

== Preseason ==
Week	Date	Opponent	Result	Record	Venue	Recap
1	August 7	at Phoenix Cardinals	L 13–24	0–1	Sun Devil Stadium	Recap
2	August 14	San Diego Chargers	L 17–23	0–2	Anaheim Stadium	Recap
3	August 21	at Cleveland Browns	L 21–10	0–3	Cleveland Stadium	Recap
4	August 28	Los Angeles Raiders	L 19–20	0–4	Anaheim Stadium	Recap

== Regular season ==
Week	Date	Opponent	Result	Record	Venue	Recap
1	September 5	at Green Bay Packers	**L** 6–36	0–1	Milwaukee County Stadium	Recap
2	September 12	Pittsburgh Steelers	**W** 27–0	1–1	Anaheim Stadium	Recap
3	September 19	at New York Giants	**L** 10–20	1–2	Giants Stadium	Recap
4	September 26	at Houston Oilers	**W** 28–13	2–2	Astrodome	Recap
5	October 3	**New Orleans Saints**	**L** 6–37	2–3	Anaheim Stadium	Recap
6	Bye					
7	October 14	at **Atlanta Falcons**	**L** 24–30	2–4	Georgia Dome	Recap
8	October 24	Detroit Lions	**L** 13–16	2–5	Anaheim Stadium	Recap
9	October 31	at **San Francisco 49ers**	**L** 17–40	2–6	Candlestick Park	Recap
10	Bye					
11	November 14	**Atlanta Falcons**	**L** 0–13	2–7	Anaheim Stadium	Recap
12	November 21	Washington Redskins	**W** 10–6	3–7	Anaheim Stadium	Recap
13	November 28	**San Francisco 49ers**	**L** 10–35	3–8	Anaheim Stadium	Recap
14	December 5	at Phoenix Cardinals	**L** 10–38	3–9	Sun Devil Stadium	Recap
15	December 12	at **New Orleans Saints**	**W** 23–20	4–9	Louisiana Superdome	Recap
16	December 19	at Cincinnati Bengals	**L** 3–15	4–10	Riverfront Stadium	Recap
17	December 26	Cleveland Browns	**L** 14–42	4–11	Anaheim Stadium	Recap
18	January 2, 1994	Chicago Bears	**W** 20–6	5–11	Anaheim Stadium	Recap
Note: Intra-division opponents are in **bold** text.

== Game summaries ==
=== Week 1 ===
Los Angeles Rams (0–0) at Green Bay Packers (0–0)

Quarter	1	2	3	4	Total
Rams	3	3	0	0	6
Packers	9	10	14	3	36

at Milwaukee County Stadium, Milwaukee, Wisconsin

- Date: September 5, 1993
- Game time: 12:00 p.m. CST
- Game weather: Overcast, 67 °F (19 °C)
- Game attendance: 54,648
- TV announcers (CBS): James Brown and Dan Jiggetts
- Pro-Football-Reference.com, The Football Database

Game information

First quarter

- GB – Safety, Cleveland Gary tackled by Brian Noble in end zone, 10:48. Packers 2–0.
- LA – Tony Zendejas 31-yard field goal, 8:29. Rams 3–2. Drive:
- GB – Sterling Sharpe 50-yard pass from Brett Favre (Chris Jacke kick), 7:10. Packers 9–3. Drive:

Second quarter

- GB – Chris Jacke 51-yard field goal, 12:17. Packers 12–3. Drive:
- LA – Tony Zendejas 32-yard field goal, 3:47. Packers 12–6. Drive:
- GB – Mark Clayton 4-yard pass from Brett Favre (Chris Jacke kick), 0:40. Packers 19–6. Drive:

Third quarter

- GB – Edgar Bennett 11-yard run (Chris Jacke kick), 8:28. Packers 26–6. Drive:
- GB – Edgar Bennett 1-yard run (Chris Jacke kick), 3:30. Packers 33–6. Drive:

Fourth quarter

- GB – Chris Jacke 33-yard field goal, 1:57. Packers 36–6. Drive:

Top passers

- LA – Jim Everett – 17/41, 175 yards, 2 INT
- GB – Brett Favre – 19/29, 264 yards, 2 TD, INT

Top rushers

- LA – Cleveland Gary – 13 rushes, 31 yards
- GB – John Stephens – 17 rushes, 75 yards

Top receivers

- LA – Troy Drayton – 2 receptions, 45 yards
- GB – Sterling Sharpe – 7 receptions, 120 yards, TD

=== Week 2 ===
Week Two: Pittsburgh Steelers (0–1) at Los Angeles Rams (0–1)

Quarter	1	2	3	4	Total
Steelers	0	0	0	0	0
Rams	0	14	3	10	27

at Anaheim Stadium, Anaheim, California

- Date: Sunday, September 12
- Game time: 1:00 p.m. PST
- Game weather: 67 °F (19.4 °C), wind 8 miles per hour (13 km/h; 7.0 kn)
- Game attendance: 50,588 (73.31% full)
- TV announcers (NBC): Dan Hicks and Joe Gibbs

Game information

Second quarter

- LA – Troy Drayton 22 yard pass from Jim Everett (Tony Zendejas kick) – Rams 7–0
- LA – Cleveland Gary 6 yard rush (Tony Zendejas kick) – Rams 14–0

Third quarter

- LA – Tony Zendejas 54 yard field goal – Rams 17–0

Fourth quarter

- LA – Tony Zendejas 50 yard field goal – Rams 20–0
- LA – Jerome Bettis 29 yard rush (Tony Zendejas kick) – Rams 27–0

Steelers

- Neil O'Donnell— 17/33, 169 Yds, 0 TD, 1 INT
- Barry Foster— 15 Rush, 50 Yds
- Ernie Mills— 6 Rec, 63 Yds

Rams

- Jim Everett— 24/34, 221 Yds, 1 TD, 2 INT
- Jerome Bettis— 6 Rush, 76 Yds
- Henry Ellard— 9 Rec, 127 Yds

=== Week 3 ===
Week Three: Los Angeles Rams (1–1) at New York Giants (2–0)

Quarter	1	2	3	4	Total
Rams	0	3	0	7	10
Giants	7	6	7	0	20

at Giants Stadium, East Rutherford, New Jersey

- Date: Sunday, September 19
- Game time: 10:00 a.m. PST
- Game weather: 65 °F (18.3 °C), wind 14 miles per hour (23 km/h; 12 kn)
- Game attendance: 76,213 (99.12% full)
- TV: CBS

Game information

First quarter

- NYG – Rodney Hampton 1 yard rush (David Treadwell kick) – Giants 7–0

Second quarter

- NYG – David Treadwell 34 yard field goal – Giants 10–0
- LA – Tony Zendejas 52 yard field goal – Giants 10–3
- NYG – David Treadwell 19 yard field goal – Giants 13–3

Third quarter

- NYG – Mark Collins 50 yard interception return (David Treadwell kick) – Giants 20–3

Fourth quarter

- LA – Flipper Anderson 51 yard pass from Jim Everett (Tony Zendejas kick) – Giants 20–10

Rams

- Jim Everett— 11/28, 135 Yds, 1 TD, 2 INT
- Jerome Bettis— 9 Rush, 33 Yds
- Flipper Anderson— 3 Rec, 63 Yds

Giants

- Phil Simms— 21/27, 217 Yds, 0 TD, 0 INT
- Rodney Hampton— 41 Rush, 134 Yds
- Mike Sherrard— 7 Rec, 65 Yds

=== Week 4 ===
Week Four: Los Angeles Rams (1–2) at Houston Oilers (1–2)

Quarter	1	2	3	4	Total
Rams	7	7	7	7	28
Oilers	0	3	10	0	13

at Houston Astrodome, Houston, Texas

- Date: Sunday, September 26
- Game time: 10:00 a.m. PST
- Game weather: Played indoors (dome stadium)
- Game attendance: 53,072 (85.57% full)
- TV: CBS

Game information

First quarter

- LA – Flipper Anderson 4 yard pass from Jim Everett (Tony Zendejas kick) – Rams 7–0

Second quarter

- LA – Jerome Bettis 1 yard rush (Tony Zendejas kick) – Rams 14–0
- HOU – Al Del Greco 52 yard field goal – Rams 14–3

Third quarter

- HOU – Al Del Greco 25 yard field goal – Rams 14–6
- HOU – Ernest Givins 80 yard pass from Warren Moon (Al Del Greco kick) – Rams 14–13
- LA – Travis McNeal 22 yard pass from Jim Everett (Tony Zendejas kick) – Rams 21–13

Fourth quarter

- LA – Henry Ellard 48 yard pass from Jim Everett (Tony Zendejas kick) – Rams 28–13

Rams

- Jim Everett— 19/28, 316 Yds, 3 TD, 0 INT
- Jerome Bettis— 11 Rush, 25 Yds
- Henry Ellard— 6 Rec, 132 Yds

Oilers

- Warren Moon— 19/42, 310 Yds, 1 TD, 2 INT
- Lorenzo White— 19 Rush, 74 Yds
- Ernest Givins— 3 Rec, 107 Yds

=== Week 5 ===
Week Five: New Orleans Saints (4–0) at Los Angeles Rams (2–2)

Quarter	1	2	3	4	Total
Saints	10	3	3	21	37
Rams	3	0	3	0	6

at Anaheim Stadium, Anaheim, California

- Date: Sunday, October 3
- Game time: 1:00 p.m. PST
- Game weather: 69 °F (20.6 °C), wind 7 miles per hour (11 km/h; 6.1 kn)
- Game attendance: 50,709 (73.48% full)
- TV: CBS

Game information

First quarter

- NO – Derek Brown 15 yard pass from Wade Wilson (Morten Andersen kick) – Saints 7–0
- NO – Morten Andersen 48 yard field goal – Saints 10–0
- LA – Tony Zendejas 53 yard field goal – Saints 10–3

Second quarter

- NO – Morten Andersen 25 yard field goal – Saints 13–3

Third quarter

- LA – Tony Zendejas 37 yard field goal – Saints 13–6
- NO – Morten Andersen 43 yard field goal – Saints 16–6

Fourth quarter

- NO – Patrick Newman 30 yd pass from Wade Wilson (Morten Andersen kick) – Saints 23–6
- NO – Tyrone Hughes 74 yard punt return (Morten Andersen kick) – Saints 30–6
- NO – Derrick Ned 35 yard rush (Morten Andersen kick) – Saints 37–6

Saints

- Wade Wilson— 15/25, 205 Yds, 2 TD, 0 INT
- Derek Brown— 14 Rush, 57 Yds
- Quinn Early— 4 Rec, 64 Yds

Rams

- Jim Everett— 10/25, 126 Yds, 0 TD, 1 INT
- Jerome Bettis— 22 Rush, 102 Yds
- Cleveland Gary— 3 Rec, 36 Yds

=== Week 7 ===
After a week 6 bye, the Rams looked to get back into the win column on a Thursday night matchup with the then-winless Falcons in Atlanta. Los Angeles got off to a good enough start, leading 17–10 at half and 24–17 heading into the fourth quarter, but things fell apart for the Rams in the fourth. Atlanta scored 13 unanswered points in the final quarter to pull away from Los Angeles and register their first win of the 1993 season.

Week Seven: Los Angeles Rams (2–3) at Atlanta Falcons (0–5)

Quarter	1	2	3	4	Total
Rams	10	7	7	0	24
Falcons	3	7	7	13	30

at Georgia Dome, Atlanta

- Date: Thursday, October 14
- Game time: 4:30 p.m. PST
- Game weather: Played indoors (dome stadium)
- Game attendance: 45,231 (63.50% full)
- TV announcers (TNT): Gary Bender and Pat Haden

Game information

First quarter

- LA – Flipper Anderson 56 yard pass from Jim Everett (Tony Zendejas kick) – Rams 7–0
- ATL – Norm Johnson 28 yard field goal – Rams 7–3
- LA – Tony Zendejas 52 yard field goal – Rams 10–3

Second quarter

- LA – Jerome Bettis 2 yard rush (Tony Zendejas kick) – Rams 17–3
- ATL – Andre Rison 21 yard pass from Billy Joe Tolliver (Norm Johnson kick) – Rams 17–10

Third quarter

- ATL – David Mims 3 yard pass from Billy Joe Tolliver (Norm Johnson kick) – Tied 17–17
- LA – Cleveland Gary 60 yard pass from Jim Everett (Tony Zendejas kick) – Rams 24–17

Fourth quarter

- ATL – Norm Johnson 32 yard field goal – Rams 24–20
- ATL – Andre Rison 42 yd pass from Billy Joe Tolliver (Norm Johnson kick) – Falcons 27–24
- ATL – Norm Johnson 34 yard field goal – Falcons 30–24

Rams

- Jim Everett— 17/35, 294 Yds, 2 TD, 2 INT
- Jerome Bettis— 19 Rush, 85 Yds
- Flipper Anderson— 4 Rec, 95 Yds

Falcons

- Billy Joe Tolliver— 18/34, 213 Yds, 3 TD, 1 INT
- Erric Pegram— 25 Rush, 87 Yds
- Erric Pegram— 6 Rec, 79 Yds

=== Week 8 ===
Week Eight: Detroit Lions (4–2) at Los Angeles Rams (2–4)

Quarter	1	2	3	4	Total
Lions	0	3	3	10	16
Rams	0	0	0	13	13

at Anaheim Stadium, Anaheim, California

- Date: Sunday, October 24
- Game time: 1:00 p.m. PST
- Game weather: 65 °F (18.3 °C), wind 9 miles per hour (14 km/h; 7.8 kn)
- Game attendance: 43,850 (63.54% full)
- TV: CBS

Game information

Second quarter

- DET – Jason Hanson 25 yard field goal – Lions 3–0

Third quarter

- DET – Jason Hanson 24 yard field goal – Lions 6–0

Fourth quarter

- DET – Barry Sanders 5 yard rush (Jason Hanson kick) – Lions 13–0
- LA – Ernie Jones 4 yard pass from T. J. Rubley (Tony Zendejas kick) – Lions 13–7
- LA – Ernie Jones 21 yard pass from T. J. Rubley (PAT failed) – Tied 13–13
- DET – Jason Hanson 18 yard field goal – Lions 16–13

Lions

- Rodney Peete— 15/25, 249 Yds, 0 TD, 1 INT
- Barry Sanders— 26 Rush, 91 Yds
- Herman Moore— 6 Rec, 160 Yds

Rams

- T. J. Rubley— 12/17, 151 Yds, 2 TD, 0 INT
- Jerome Bettis— 23 Rush, 113 Yds
- Todd Kinchen— 4 Rec, 60 Yds

=== Week 9 ===
Week Nine: Los Angeles Rams (2–5) at San Francisco 49ers (4–3)

Quarter	1	2	3	4	Total
Rams	3	0	7	7	17
49ers	6	17	7	10	40

at Candlestick Park, San Francisco, California

- Date: Sunday, October 31
- Game time: 1:00 p.m. PDT
- Game weather: 61 °F (16.1 °C), wind 10 miles per hour (16 km/h; 8.7 kn)
- Game attendance: 63,417 (95.35% full)
- TV: CBS

Game information

First quarter

- LA – Tony Zendejas 50 yard field goal – Rams 3–0
- SF – Ricky Watters 1 yard rush (PAT failed) – 49ers 6–3

Second quarter

- SF – John Taylor 15 yard pass from Steve Young (Mike Cofer kick) – 49ers 13–3
- SF – Marc Logan 1 yard rush (Mike Cofer kick) – 49ers 20–3
- SF – Mike Cofer 25 yard field goal – 49ers 23–3

Third quarter

- LA – Todd Kinchen 35 yard pass from T. J. Rubley (Tony Zendejas kick) – 49ers 23–10
- SF – Marc Logan 1 yard rush (Mike Cofer kick) – 49ers 30–10

Fourth quarter

- LA – Jerome Bettis 1 yard rush (Tony Zendejas kick) – 49ers 30–17
- SF – Mike Cofer 28 yard field goal – 49ers 33–17
- SF – Michael McGruder 32 yard interception return (Mike Cofer kick) – 49ers 40–17

Rams

- T. J. Rubley— 15/26, 158 Yds, 1 TD, 2 INT
- Jerome Bettis— 21 Rush, 72 Yds
- Todd Kinchen— 3 Rec, 64 Yds

49ers

- Steve Young— 22/34, 245 Yds, 1 TD, 0 INT
- Steve Young— 7 Rush, 57 Yds
- John Taylor— 4 Rec, 90 Yds

=== Week 11 ===
Coming out of their second bye week, Los Angeles once again faced the Atlanta Falcons—this time, in Anaheim. While the Falcons were winless going into their early meeting with the Rams, since then, they had won two of their last three and came into the second matchup at 2–6. While Los Angeles was favored by three, the Rams could not get anything going offensively and lost to the Falcons, 13–0, being shut out at home for the first time since 1984.

Week Eleven: Atlanta Falcons (2–6) at Los Angeles Rams (2–6)

Quarter	1	2	3	4	Total
Falcons	3	3	7	0	13
Rams	0	0	0	0	0

at Anaheim Stadium, Anaheim, California

- Date: Sunday, November 14
- Game time: 1:00 p.m. PDT
- Game weather: 59 °F (15 °C), wind 15 miles per hour (24 km/h; 13 kn)
- Game attendance: 37,073 (53.72% full)
- TV: CBS

Game information

First quarter

- ATL – Norm Johnson 46 yard field goal – Falcons 3–0

Second quarter

- ATL – Norm Johnson 44 yard field goal – Falcons 6–0

Third quarter

- ATL – Andre Rison 31 yard pass from Bobby Hebert (Norm Johnson kick) – Falcons 13–0

Falcons

- Bobby Hebert— 12/21, 182 Yds, 1 TD, 1 INT
- Erric Pegram— 27 Rush, 28 Yds
- Andre Rison— 5 Rec, 120 Yds

Rams

- Jim Everett— 20/41, 203 Yds, 0 TD, 2 INT
- David Lang— 2 Rush, 29 Yds
- Henry Ellard— 3 Rec, 53 Yds

=== Week 12 ===
Week Twelve: Washington Redskins (2–7) at Los Angeles Rams (2–7)

Quarter	1	2	3	4	Total
Redskins	3	0	3	0	6
Rams	0	0	0	10	10

at Anaheim Stadium, Anaheim, California

- Date: Sunday, November 21
- Game time: 1:00 p.m. PDT
- Game weather: 64 °F (18 °C), wind 9 miles per hour (14 km/h; 7.8 kn)
- Game attendance: 45,546 (66.00% full)
- TV: CBS

Game information

First quarter

- WAS – Chip Lohmiller 19 yard field goal – Redskins 3–0

Third quarter

- WAS – Chip Lohmiller 34 yard field goal – Redskins 3–0

Fourth quarter

- LA – Troy Drayton 25 yard pass from T. J. Rubley (Tony Zendejas kick) – Rams 7–6
- LA – Tony Zendejas 23 yard field goal – Rams 10–6

Redskins

- Rich Gannon— 24/39, 170 Yds, 0 TD, 1 INT
- Reggie Brooks— 22 Rush, 87 Yds
- Ricky Sanders— 8 Rec, 57 Yds

Rams

- T. J. Rubley— 5/6, 112 Yds, 1 TD, 0 INT
- Jerome Bettis— 16 Rush, 86 Yds
- Pat Carter— 2 Rec, 45 Yds

=== Week 13 ===
Week Thirteen: San Francisco 49ers (7–3) at Los Angeles Rams (3–7)

Quarter	1	2	3	4	Total
49ers	7	14	7	7	35
Rams	3	0	0	7	10

at Anaheim Stadium, Anaheim, California

- Date: Sunday, November 28
- Game time: 1:00 p.m. PDT
- Game weather: 66 °F (18.9 °C), wind 8 miles per hour (13 km/h; 7.0 kn)
- Game attendance: 62,143 (90.05% full)
- TV: CBS

Game information

First quarter

- SF – Ricky Watters 6 yard rush (Mike Cofer kick) – 49ers 7–0
- LA – Tony Zendejas 25 yard field goal – 49ers 7–3

Second quarter

- SF – Jerry Rice 39 yard pass from Steve Young (Mike Cofer kick) – 49ers 14–3
- SF – Ricky Watters 48 yard pass from Steve Young (Mike Cofer kick) – 49ers 21–3

Third quarter

- SF – John Taylor 76 yard pass from Steve Young (Mike Cofer kick) – 49ers 28–3

Fourth quarter

- SF – Jerry Rice 7 yard pass from Steve Young (Mike Cofer kick) – 49ers 35–3
- LA – Henry Ellard 14 yard pass from T. J. Rubley (Tony Zendejas kick) – 49ers 35–10

49ers

- Steve Young— 26/32, 462 Yds, 4 TD, 1 INT
- Ricky Watters— 18 Rush, 47 Yds
- Jerry Rice— 8 Rec, 166 Yds

Rams

- T. J. Rubley— 13/28, 167 Yds, 1 TD, 1 INT
- Jerome Bettis— 18 Rush, 133 Yds
- Henry Ellard— 5 Rec, 90 Yds

=== Week 14 ===
Week fourteen saw Los Angeles lose yet again, falling to 3–9 on the season. While the Rams had been considered out of the running for the NFC West Championship for many weeks, with their loss to Phoenix, Los Angeles became mathematically eliminated from the NFC West. The Rams would eventually finish last in the division.

Week Fourteen: Los Angeles Rams (3–8) at Phoenix Cardinals (3–8)

Quarter	1	2	3	4	Total
Rams	3	0	0	7	10
Cardinals	7	7	14	10	38

at Sun Devil Stadium, Tempe, Arizona

- Date: Sunday, December 5
- Game time: 1:00 p.m. PDT
- Game weather: 55 °F (12.8 °C), wind 5 miles per hour (8.0 km/h; 4.3 kn)
- Game attendance: 33,964 (46.23% full)
- TV: CBS

Game information

First quarter

- PHX – Ronald Moore 1 yard rush (Greg Davis kick) – Cardinals 7–0
- LA – Tony Zendejas 22 yard field goal – Cardinals 7–3

Second quarter

- PHX – Gary Clark 22 yard pass from Steve Beuerlein (Greg Davis kick) – Cardinals 14–3

Third quarter

- PHX – Ronald Moore 19 yard rush (Greg Davis kick) – Cardinals 21–3
- PHX – Ronald Moore 1 yard rush (Greg Davis kick) – Cardinals 28–3

Fourth quarter

- PHX – Greg Davis 27 yard field goal – Cardinals 31–3
- PHX – Ronald Moore 1 yard rush (Greg Davis kick) – Cardinals 38–3
- LA – Troy Drayton 4 yard pass from Jim Everett (Tony Zendejas kick) – Cardinals 38–10

Rams

- T. J. Rubley— 5/15, 89 Yds, 0 TD, 1 INT
- Jerome Bettis— 16 Rush, 115 Yds
- Henry Ellard— 3 Rec, 83 Yds

Cardinals

- Steve Beuerlein— 14/25, 250 Yds, 1 TD, 0 INT
- Ronald Moore— 29 Rush, 126 Yds
- Gary Clark— 8 Rec, 159 Yds

=== Week 15 ===
Week Fifteen: Los Angeles Rams (3–9) at New Orleans Saints (7–5)

Quarter	1	2	3	4	Total
Rams	10	0	13	0	23
Saints	7	6	0	7	20

at Louisiana Superdome, New Orleans

- Date: Sunday, December 12
- Game time: 10:00 a.m. PDT
- Game weather: Played indoors (dome stadium)
- Game attendance: 69,033 (99.95% full)
- TV: CBS

Game information

First quarter

- NO – Sam Mills 30 yard fumble return (Morten Andersen kick) – Saints 7–0
- LA – Tony Zendejas 22 yard field goal – Saints 7–3
- LA – Jerome Bettis 71 yard rush (Tony Zendejas kick) – Rams 10–7

Second quarter

- NO – Morten Andersen 18 yard field goal – Tied 10–10
- NO – Morten Andersen 32 yard field goal – Saints 13–10

Third quarter

- LA – Deral Boykin 6 yard fumble return (Tony Zendejas kick) – Rams 17–13
- LA – Pat Carter 11 yard pass from T. J. Rubley – Rams 23–13

Fourth quarter

- NO – Dalton Hilliard 2 yard rush (Morten Andersen kick) – Rams 23–20

Rams

- T. J. Rubley— 5/13, 47 Yds, 1 TD, 0 INT
- Jerome Bettis— 28 Rush, 212 Yds
- Pat Carter— 2 Rec, 22 Yds

Saints

- Wade Wilson— 25/43, 267 Yds, 0 TD, 1 INT
- Brad Muster— 13 Rush, 53 Yds
- Eric Martin— 8 Rec, 97 Yds

=== Week 16 ===
For week 16, Los Angeles traveled to Cincinnati to face the one-win Bengals. Once again, the Rams were unable to put together a competent offense and were only able to score three points the entire game. With the loss to Cincinnati, Los Angeles found itself mathematically eliminated from playoff contention for the fourth straight season. At the time, the Rams also handed the Bengals only their second win of the season—their first incidentally came against the Rams’ cross-town rival, the Raiders. Ram tackle Irv Eatman stated that “They [Cincinnati] beat us, they beat the Raiders, they played the 49ers tough and obviously they’re just hell on California...they might be looking to put us on the schedule more frequently.”

Week Sixteen: Los Angeles Rams (4–9) at Cincinnati Bengals (1–12)

Quarter	1	2	3	4	Total
Rams	0	3	0	0	3
Bengals	3	6	3	3	15

at Riverfront Stadium, Cincinnati

- Date: Sunday, December 19
- Game time: 10:00 a.m. PDT
- Game weather: 35 °F (1.7 °C), wind 11 miles per hour (18 km/h; 9.6 kn)
- Game attendance: 36,612 (60.63% full)
- TV: CBS

Game information

First quarter

- CIN – Doug Pelfrey 43 yard field goal – Bengals 3–0

Second quarter

- CIN – Derrick Fenner 1 yard rush (PAT failed) – Bengals 9–0
- LA – Tony Zendejas 32 yard field goal – Bengals 9–13

Third quarter

- CIN – Doug Pelfrey 28 yard field goal – Bengals 12–3

Fourth quarter

- CIN – Doug Pelfrey 25 yard field goal – Bengals 15–3

Rams

- T. J. Rubley— 11/24, 107 Yds, 0 TD, 0 INT
- Jerome Bettis— 24 Rush, 124 Yds
- Henry Ellard— 4 Rec, 68 Yds

Bengals

- David Klingler— 16/30, 223 Yds, 0 TD, 0 INT
- Derrick Fenner— 15 Rush, 89 Yds
- Tony McGee— 6 Rec, 90 Yds

=== Week 17 ===
Week Seventeen: Cleveland Browns (6–8) at Los Angeles Rams (4–10)

Quarter	1	2	3	4	Total
Browns	7	7	7	21	42
Rams	7	0	0	7	14

at Anaheim Stadium, Anaheim, California

- Date: Sunday, December 26
- Game time: 1:00 p.m. PDT
- Game weather: 60 °F (15.6 °C), wind 8 miles per hour (13 km/h; 7.0 kn)
- Game attendance: 34,155 (49.49% full)
- TV: NBC

Game information

First quarter

- LA – Jerome Bettis 1 yard rush (Tony Zendejas kick) – Rams 7–0
- CLE – Tommy Vardell 1 yard rush (Matt Stover kick) – Tied 7–7

Second quarter

- CLE – Keenan McCardell 8 yd pass from Vinny Testaverde (M. Stover kick) – Browns 14–7

Third quarter

- CLE – Keenan McCardell 28 yd pass from Vinny Testaverde (M. Stover kick) – Browns 21–7

Fourth quarter

- CLE – Mark Carrier 56 yard punt return (Matt Stover kick) – Browns 28–7
- CLE – Tommy Vardell 1 yard rush (Matt Stover kick) – Browns 35–7
- CLE – Kevin Mack 1 yard rush (Matt Stover kick) – Browns 42–7
- LA – Flipper Anderson 23 yard pass from T. J. Rubley (Tony Zendejas kick) – Browns 28–14

Browns

- Vinny Testaverde— 21/23, 216 Yds, 2 TD, 0 INT
- Eric Metcalf— 15 Rush, 56 Yds
- Keenan McCardell— 4 Rec, 72 Yds

Rams

- T. J. Rubley— 24/32, 294 Yds, 1 TD, 2 INT
- Jerome Bettis— 16 Rush, 56 Yds
- Henry Ellard— 8 Rec, 114 Yds

=== Week 18 ===
Week Eighteen: Chicago Bears (7–8) at Los Angeles Rams (4–11)

Quarter	1	2	3	4	Total
Bears	0	3	0	3	6
Rams	3	3	0	14	20

at Anaheim Stadium, Anaheim, California

- Date: Sunday, January 2
- Game time: 1:00 p.m. PDT
- Game weather: 58 °F (14.4 °C), wind 6 miles per hour (9.7 km/h; 5.2 kn)
- Game attendance: 39,147 (56.73% full)
- TV: CBS

Game information

First quarter

- LA – Tony Zendejas 29 yard field goal – Rams 3–0

Second quarter

- LA – Tony Zendejas 29 yard field goal – Rams 6–0
- CHI – Kevin Butler 27 yard field goal – Rams 6–3

Fourth quarter

- LA – Troy Drayton 11 yard pass from T. J. Rubley (Tony Zendejas kick) – Rams 13–3
- CHI – Kevin Butler 53 yard field goal – Rams 13–6
- LA – Jerome Bettis 4 yard rush (Tony Zendejas kick) – Rams 20–6

Bears

- Jim Harbaugh— 9/10, 62 Yds, 0 TD, 0 INT
- Tim Worley— 7 Rush, 51 Yds
- Tom Waddle— 2 Rec, 26 Yds

Rams

- T. J. Rubley— 18/28, 213 Yds, 1 TD, 0 INT
- Jerome Bettis— 39 Rush, 146 Yds
- Jerome Bettis— 5 Rec, 71 Yds

=== Standings ===
NFC West
	W	L	T	PCT	PF	PA	STK
^{(2)} San Francisco 49ers	10	6	0	.625	473	295	L2
New Orleans Saints	8	8	0	.500	317	343	W1
Atlanta Falcons	6	10	0	.375	316	385	L3
Los Angeles Rams	5	11	0	.313	221	367	W1

== Rumors of team moving ==
Rumors of relocation affected the Rams’ performance: owner Georgia Frontiere had wanted to break the Rams’ lease of Anaheim Stadium at the end of the 1992 season, and there were over seven thousand no-shows at the November 21 game against the Redskins. At Christmas time, it was revealed that Frontiere wanted to move the Rams to Baltimore, which had lost out surprisingly to Jacksonville, Florida in the recent league expansion bid. This relocation was not approved, but the inadequacy of Anaheim Stadium led Frontiere to move the team to her hometown of St. Louis in 1995.

== See also ==
- History of the Los Angeles Rams
- Anaheim Stadium
