= 1989 Los Angeles Rams season =

NFL team season

- Owner: Georgia Frontiere
- General manager: John Shaw
- Head coach: John Robinson
- Offensive coordinator: Ernie Zampese
- Defensive coordinator: Fritz Shurmur
- Home stadium: Anaheim Stadium

Results
- Record: 11–5
- Division place: 2nd NFC West
- Playoffs: Won Wild Card Playoffs (at Eagles) 21–7; Won Divisional Playoffs (at Giants) 19–13 (OT); Lost NFC Championship (at 49ers) 3–30

Uniform
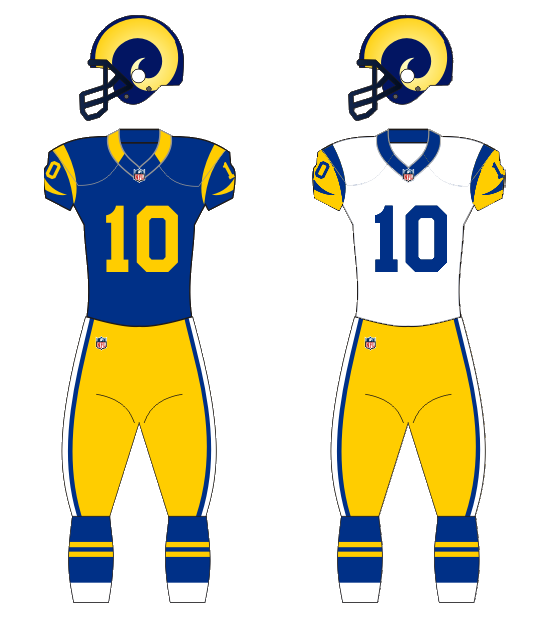

The 1989 Los Angeles Rams season was the franchise's 52nd season in the National Football League, their 53rd overall, and their 44th in the Greater Los Angeles Area. It constituted their last postseason appearance in Los Angeles before owner Georgia Frontiere, who would eventually move the team to St. Louis six seasons later, sold many top players, and in the playoffs, they were defeated by the eventual Super Bowl champion San Francisco 49ers 30–3 in the NFC Championship Game

It also constituted their last winning season until 1999 in St. Louis, and last in Los Angeles until 2017.

== Offseason ==
=== NFL draft ===
1989 Los Angeles Rams draft
Round	Pick	Player	Position	College	Notes
1	21	Bill Hawkins	Defensive end	Miami (FL)	
1	26	Cleveland Gary	Running back	Miami (FL)	
2	45	Frank Stams	Linebacker	Notre Dame	
2	48	Brian Smith	Linebacker	Auburn	
2	53	Darryl Henley	Cornerback	UCLA	
3	75	Kevin Robbins	Offensive tackle	Michigan State	
4	102	Jeff Carlson	Quarterback	Weber State	
5	135	Alfred Jackson	Cornerback	San Diego State	
6	148	Thom Kaumeyer	Safety	Oregon	
6	161	Mark Messner	Linebacker	Michigan	
7	188	George Bethune	Linebacker	Alabama	
8	215	Warren Wheat	Guard	BYU	
9	242	Vernon Kirk	Tight end	Pittsburgh	
10	269	Mike Williams	Wide receiver	Northeastern	
Made roster * Made at least one Pro Bowl during career

=== Undrafted free agents ===
1989 undrafted free agents of note
Player	Position	College
Richard Ashe	Tight end	Humboldt State
Greg Coavette	Cornerback	USC
Jim Doughty	Linebacker	UC Davis
Mel Farr	Running back	UCLA
Brian Hawkins	Wide receiver	Oregon
Anthony Sargent	Wide receiver	Wyoming

== Personnel ==
=== Staff ===
1989 Los Angeles Rams staff
Front office: Owner/President – Georgia Frontiere; Vice president of finance – John Shaw; General counsel – Jay Zygmunt; Administrator of football operations – Jack Faulkner; Director of operations – Dick Beam; Director of player personnel – John Math; Head coaches: Head coach – John Robinson; Offensive coaches: Offensive coordinator – Ernie Zampese; Quarterbacks – Dick Coury; Running backs – Gil Haskell; Tight ends/wide receivers – Norv Turner; Offensive line – Hudson Houck	Defensive coaches: Defensive coordinator/inside linebackers – Fritz Shurmur; Defensive line – Marv Goux; Assistant defensive line – Larry Brooks; Outside linebackers – Fred Whittingham; Defensive backs – Steve Shafer; Special teams coaches: Special teams – Artie Gigantino

=== Roster ===
1989 Los Angeles Rams roster
Quarterbacks (QB): 11 Jim Everett; 9 Mark Herrmann; Running backs (RB): 42 Greg Bell; 39 Robert Delpino; 34 Mel Farr Jr.; 43 Cleveland Gary; 44 Gaston Green; 24 Buford McGee; Wide receivers (WR): 83 Flipper Anderson; 89 Ron Brown KR; 84 Aaron Cox; 80 Henry Ellard; Tight ends (TE): 88 Pat Carter; 81 Pete Holohan; 86 Damone Johnson	Offensive linemen (OL): 79 Kurt Becker G; 72 Robert Jenkins T; 67 Duval Love G; 66 Tom Newberry G; 75 Irv Pankey T; 78 Jackie Slater T; 61 Tony Slaton G; 56 Doug Smith C; Defensive linemen (DL): 98 Shawn Miller DE; 95 Mike Piel DE; 97 Sean Smith DE; 99 Alvin Wright NT	Linebackers (LB): 57 George Bethune OLB; 51 Brett Faryniarz OLB; 91 Kevin Greene OLB; 52 Larry Kelm ILB; 60 Mark Messner ILB; 58 Mel Owens ILB; 96 Brian Smith OLB; 50 Frank Stams ILB; 53 Fred Strickland ILB; 54 Mike Wilcher OLB; Defensive backs (DB): 25 Jerry Gray CB; 20 Darryl Henley CB/PR; 28 Cliff Hicks CB; 47 LeRoy Irvin CB; 31 Alfred Jackson CB/S; 22 Vince Newsome FS; 23 Michael Stewart SS; Special teams (ST): 5 Dale Hatcher P; 1 Mike Lansford K; 90 Mike McDonald LS	Practice squad: 87 Richard Ashe TE; -- Jeff Carlson QB; Reserve: 70 Bill Hawkins DE (IR); 26 Anthony Newman S (IR); 93 Doug Reed DE (IR); -- Mark Schmidt G (IR); 37 James Washington S (IR); 47 active, 5 inactive, 2 practice squad Rookies in italics

== Regular season ==
=== Schedule ===
Week	Date	Opponent	Result	Record	Venue	Recap
1	September 10	at **Atlanta Falcons**	**W** 31–21	1–0	Atlanta–Fulton County Stadium	Recap
2	September 17	Indianapolis Colts	**W** 31–17	2–0	Anaheim Stadium	Recap
3	September 24	Green Bay Packers	**W** 41–38	3–0	Anaheim Stadium	Recap
4	October 1	at **San Francisco 49ers**	**W** 13–12	4–0	Candlestick Park	Recap
5	October 8	**Atlanta Falcons**	**W** 26–14	5–0	Anaheim Stadium	Recap
6	October 16	at Buffalo Bills	**L** 20–23	5–1	Rich Stadium	Recap
7	October 22	**New Orleans Saints**	**L** 21–40	5–2	Anaheim Stadium	Recap
8	October 29	at Chicago Bears	**L** 10–20	5–3	Soldier Field	Recap
9	November 5	at Minnesota Vikings	**L** 21–23 (OT)	5–4	Hubert H. Humphrey Metrodome	Recap
10	November 12	New York Giants	**W** 31–10	6–4	Anaheim Stadium	Recap
11	November 19	Phoenix Cardinals	**W** 37–14	7–4	Anaheim Stadium	Recap
12	November 26	at **New Orleans Saints**	**W** 20–17 (OT)	8–4	Louisiana Superdome	Recap
13	December 3	at Dallas Cowboys	**W** 35–31	9–4	Texas Stadium	Recap
14	December 11	**San Francisco 49ers**	**L** 27–30	9–5	Anaheim Stadium	Recap
15	December 17	New York Jets	**W** 38–14	10–5	Anaheim Stadium	Recap
16	December 24	at New England Patriots	**W** 24–20	11–5	Sullivan Stadium	Recap
Note: Intra-division opponents are in **bold** text.

== Game summaries ==
=== Week 1 ===
- Network: CBS
- TV Announcers: Steve Zabriskie and Terry Bradshaw

Falcons rookie Deion Sanders gave the home crowd an early lift with a punt return TD (despite fumbling the ball twice), but Rams pulled away in the second half behind 128 yards rushing and two touchdowns by Greg Bell. Kevin Greene had three sacks.

=== Week 2 ===
Jim Everett and Henry Ellard hooked up for three scores as the Rams had another strong second half.

=== Week 3 ===
Rams rolled to a 38–7 halftime lead behind Bell's 221 rushing yards and 2 TD's and 2 more TD passes by Everett, but barely held off a furious comeback from the Packers behind Don Majkowski.

=== Week 4 ===
Rams got early NFC West bragging rights in a tough road win. Everett hit Willie Anderson on a 65-yard TD bomb for the game's only TD.

=== Week 5 ===
Everett passed for two touchdowns and Mike Lansford booted four field goals.

=== Week 6 ===
In a wild Monday night affair, Frank Reich, subbing for an injured Jim Kelly, tossed a pair of 4th quarter TD passes including the game-winner to Andre Reed.

=== Week 7 ===
A 2–4 Saints team blew out the Rams on their home turf behind 3 TD passes by Bobby Hebert. Saints local product Dalton Hilliard from LSU had 3 TD's, two rushing and one receiving.

=== Week 8 ===
Rams lost their third straight in the cold of Chicago as the Bear defense held Everett to 13 of 35 passing and intercepted him twice.

=== Week 9 ===
In a highly unusual overtime loss, the Rams kept the Vikings out of the end zone, but Vikings kicker Rich Karlis booted seven FG's. The winning score came when LB Mike Merriweather blocked a Dale Hatcher punt out of the end zone for a safety. The Vikings became the first NFL team ever to win in sudden death OT on a safety, while the Rams became the first NFL team to lose a game in which they scored three touchdowns and allowed none.

=== Week 10 ===
Rams got back to their winning ways behind two Everett TD passes and two Bell TD runs.

=== Week 11 ===
Rams rolled to a 24–0 halftime lead and cruised behind two more TD passes from Everett. Robert Delpino had a 32-yd TD run as well.

=== Week 12 ===
Saints were in control at the Superdome, leading 17–3 after 3. Everett, however, led the Rams back behind 454 passing yards, a record 336 of them receiving on 15 catches in a monster performance by Willie Anderson.

=== Week 13 ===
Everett outdueled Dallas rookie Troy Aikman in a spirited performance by the 1–11 Cowboys. Both QB's had 4 TD's passing. Late in the game with the Rams leading 35–31 but Dallas driving; an attempt by Aikman to get the signal for the next play was mistaken for a timeout signal by umpire Art Demmas; costing the Cowboys their final timeout. Dallas advanced on the drive to the Los Angeles 10 yard line but couldn't stop the clock before time ran out.

=== Week 14 ===
In a classic MNF performance, Joe Montana tossed three TD's, two of them for over 90 yards to John Taylor. The Rams led 27–10 entering the final period when Montana hit Mike Wilson for a TD to cut it to 27–17. The Rams were driving to a TD when Everett fumbled a snap at the 49er 4, and on the very next play, Montana hit Taylor for a 96-yd TD to cut it to 27–23. The 49ers capped their amazing comeback a Roger Craig TD run after Ron Brown fumbled the ensuing kickoff.

=== Week 15 ===
The Rams took out their frustrations on the Jets by rolling to a 28–7 halftime lead and cruising behind two passing TD's from Everett and two rushing TD's from Bell.

=== Week 16 ===
Bell ran for 210 yards and the winning score in the 4th as the Rams clinched a wild-card berth.

=== Standings ===
NFC West
	W	L	T	PCT	DIV	CONF	PF	PA	STK
^{(1)} San Francisco 49ers	14	2	0	.875	5–1	10–2	442	253	W5
^{(5)} Los Angeles Rams	11	5	0	.688	4–2	8–4	426	344	W2
New Orleans Saints	9	7	0	.563	3–3	5–7	386	301	W3
Atlanta Falcons	3	13	0	.188	0–6	1–11	279	437	L7

== Playoffs ==
=== NFC Wild Card Game ===
Los Angeles Rams 21, Philadelphia Eagles 7

Quarter	1	2	3	4	Total
Rams	14	0	0	7	21
Eagles	0	0	0	7	7

at Veterans Stadium, Philadelphia

- Game time: 12:30 p.m. EST, 12/31/1989
- Game weather: 34 °F (1.1 °C), relative humidity 94%, wind 8 miles per hour (13 km/h; 7.0 kn), wind chill 27 °F (−2.8 °C)
- Game attendance: 65,479
- Referee: Gordon McCarter
- TV announcers (CBS): Pat Summerall and John Madden

Despite being underdogs on the road, the Rams took a 14–0 lead in the first quarter as Jim Everett connected for touchdowns to Henry Ellard and Damone Johnson. The Eagles offense, led by explosive quarterback Randall Cunningham, was held in check by Fritz Shurmur's zone defense which prevented Philadelphia from making big plays downfield. Still, the Eagles closed the gap to 14–7 in the fourth quarter on a touchdown run by Anthony Toney. But Rams running back Greg Bell broke off a 54-yard run down the left sideline down to the Eagles 10-yard-line, then finished off his 124-yard rushing day two plays later with his 27th carry going for seven yards and L.A.'s final touchdown. Los Angeles won in the wild card round for the first time since 1983.

=== NFC Divisional Playoff ===
Los Angeles Rams 19, New York Giants 13 (OT)

Quarter	1	2	3	4	OT	Total
Rams	0	7	0	6	6	19
Giants	6	0	7	0	0	13

at Giants Stadium, East Rutherford, New Jersey

- Game time: 12:30 p.m. EST, 1/7/1990
- Game weather: 37 °F (2.8 °C), relative humidity 52%, wind 15 miles per hour (24 km/h; 13 kn), wind chill 29 °F (−1.7 °C)
- Game attendance: 76,325
- Referee: Bob McElwee
- TV announcers (CBS): Pat Summerall and John Madden

Playing on the East Coast for the third time in as many weeks, the Rams faced off against the NFC East champions in a tough defensive battle. New York jumped to a 6–0 lead in the first quarter with two field goals by kicker Raul Allegre. But with 17 seconds left in the first half, Jim Everett found Flipper Anderson for a 20-yard touchdown reception that, with Mike Lansford's PAT, gave the Rams a 7–6 lead at the intermission. In the third quarter, the Giants retook the lead as running back Ottis Anderson scored on a 2-yard touchdown. But in the fourth period, Lansford made two field goals to tie the game, the second one coming with 3:01 left in regulation and eventually send the game into overtime. Receiving the kickoff, the Rams drove 78 yards, with a key pass interference call on Giants cornerback Sheldon White that gave Los Angeles a first down in Giants territory. Two plays later, Everett found Anderson for a 30-yard touchdown pass to end the game just 1:06 into the extra period. Rams receiver Henry Ellard had the best postseason performance of his career with 8 receptions for 125 yards, while Everett had 315 yards passing for the game.

=== NFC Championship Game ===
San Francisco 49ers 30, Los Angeles Rams 3

Quarter	1	2	3	4	Total
Rams	3	0	0	0	3
49ers	0	21	3	6	30

at Candlestick Park, San Francisco

- Game time: 5:00 p.m. EST/2:00 p.m. PST, 1/14/1990
- Game weather: 52 °F (11.1 °C), relative humidity 91%, wind 14 miles per hour (23 km/h; 12 kn)
- Game attendance: 64,769
- Referee: Jerry Markbreit
- TV announcers (CBS): Pat Summerall and John Madden

The Rams' season came to an end against the rival 49ers. Starting at midfield on its first possession, L.A. drove 44 yards in 10 plays, ending with a 23-yard field goal by Mike Lansford. On the ensuing San Francisco drive, linebacker Larry Kelm recovered a fumble by 49ers tight end Brent Jones, but the Rams drive stalled as Jim Everett twice attempted deep passes to Flipper Anderson which fell incomplete. L.A. was forced to punt the ball away, and never threatened to score again. The 49ers scored on three straight possessions in the second quarter and totaled 442 yards on offense and held the ball for 39:48 for the game. The Rams were held to only 26 yards rushing and Everett threw three interceptions in the loss, L.A.'s second appearance in the NFC Championship Game in five seasons. This marked the Rams last appearance in the playoffs, let alone the NFC Championship until 1999 & their last loss in NFC Championship game until 2025.

== Awards and records ==
- Flipper Anderson, NFL Game Record, Most Receiving Yards in One Game, 336 yards (vs. New Orleans Saints on November 26, 1989)
- NFC Pro Bowl Selections - Henry Ellard WR, Jerry Gray CB (Pro Bowl MVP), Kevin Greene OLB, Tom Newberry LG, Jackie Slater RT, Doug Smith C

== See also ==
- Los Angeles Rams
- Anaheim Stadium
- 1989 NFL season

=== Other Anaheim–based teams in 1989 ===
- California Angels (Anaheim Stadium)
  - 1989 California Angels season
