= 1995 St. Louis Rams season =

NFL team season (1st in St. Louis)

- Owner: Georgia Frontiere
- General manager: Steve Ortmayer
- Head coach: Rich Brooks
- Offensive coordinator: Jack Reilly
- Defensive coordinator: Willie Shaw
- Home stadium: Busch Stadium (First four home games); Trans World Dome (final four home games)

Results
- Record: 7–9
- Division place: 3rd NFC West
- Playoffs: Did not qualify
- Pro Bowlers: None

Uniform
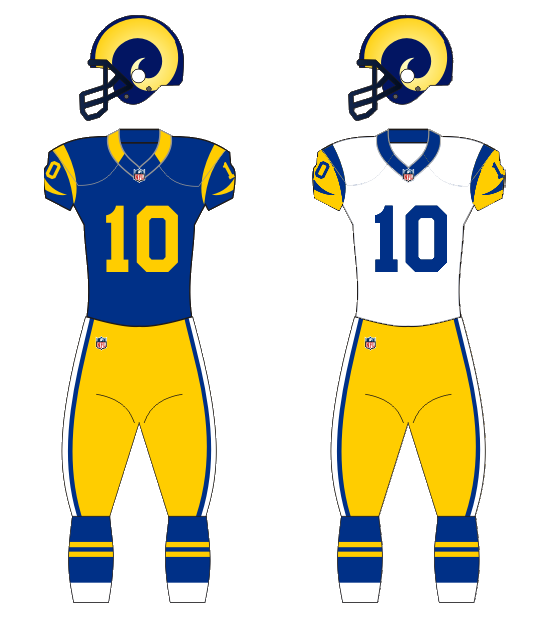

The 1995 St. Louis Rams season was the team's 58th year with the National Football League (NFL) and the first of 21 seasons in St. Louis. After playing the entire preseason on the road, the team played the first half of the season at Busch Memorial Stadium (former home of the NFL's St. Louis Cardinals) before their new venue, the Trans World Dome, opened in November. The Rams looked to start their tenure in St. Louis strong by improving on the team's 4–12 record from 1994. In their first game in St. Louis, the Rams beat the New Orleans Saints 17–13, and ultimately got off to a 4–0 start, leading the NFC West and looked poised to make a statement in the NFC. However, St. Louis struggled later in the season. In Week 8, the then-5-1 Rams were pounded 44–10 by the defending Super Bowl champion San Francisco 49ers in the last NFL game played at Busch Stadium. Following this loss, the team could not recover, as they only won two more games for the remainder of the season, one of those being the inaugural game in the Trans World Dome (28-17 over the Carolina Panthers). Ultimately, the Rams finished with a 7–9 record and missed the playoffs for the sixth consecutive season. This would be the only time between 1990 and 1998 the Rams did not finish a season with double-digit losses. It was also the Rams' best finish until 1999 when they finished 13–3 and went on to win that year's Super Bowl. 1995 would also be NFL offensive linemen Jackie Slater's 20th and final season.

== Offseason ==
Additions	Subtractions
LB Carlos Jenkins (Vikings)	LB Joe Kelly (Packers)
WR Alexander Wright (Raiders)	QB Chris Chandler (Oilers)
	G Tom Newberry (Steelers)
	K Tony Zendejas (Falcons)
	CB Robert Bailey (Redskins)
	RB Tim Lester (Steelers)
	QB Tommy Maddox (Giants)

=== 1995 expansion draft ===
St. Louis Rams selected during the expansion draft
Round	Overall	Name	Position	Expansion team
8	16	Howard Griffith	FB	Carolina Panthers
21	42	Richard Buchanan	WR	Carolina Panthers

=== NFL draft ===
1995 St. Louis Rams draft
Round	Pick	Player	Position	College	Notes
1	6	Kevin Carter *	Defensive end	Florida	
2	38	Zach Wiegert	Guard	Nebraska	
2	62	Jesse James	Center	Mississippi State	
3	82	Steve McLaughlin	Kicker	Arizona	
4	115	Lovell Pinkney	Tight end	Texas	
5	140	Mike Scurlock	Safety	Arizona	
7	214	Gerald McBurrows	Safety	Kansas	
7	220	Herman O'Berry	Defensive back	Oregon	
7	239	Bronzell Miller	Defensive end	Utah	
7	240	J. T. Thomas	Wide receiver	Arizona State	
Made roster * Made at least one Pro Bowl during career

=== Undrafted free agents ===
1995 undrafted free agents of note
Player	Position	College
Bill Kushner	Punter	Boston College
Tony Miller	Wide receiver	UCLA
Luther Morris	Tight end	Northwestern
Franklin Stephens	Center	Georgia Southern

== Personnel ==
=== Staff ===
1995 St. Louis Rams staff
Front office: Chairman – Georgia Frontiere; Vice chairman – Stan Kroenke; President – John Shaw; Senior vice-president – Jay Zygmunt; Vice-president of football operations – Steve Ortmayer; Director of player personnel – John Becker; Head coaches: Head coach – Rich Brooks; Offensive coaches: Offensive coordinator/quarterbacks – Jack Reilly; Assistant head coach/running backs – Johnny Roland; Wide receivers – Mike Martz; Offensive Line/tight ends – Steve Greatwood; Offensive line – Dan Radakovich; Offensive Assistant/quality control – John Ramsdell	Defensive coaches: Defensive coordinator – Willie Shaw; Defensive line – Deek Pollard; Linebackers – Dick Selcer; Secondary – Nick Aliotti; Defensive assistant/quality control – Steve Brown; Special teams coaches: Special teams – Wayne Sevier; Strength and conditioning: Strength and conditioning – Chris Clausen

=== Roster ===
1995 St. Louis Rams roster
Quarterbacks (QB): 12 Chris Miller; 16 Dave Barr; 11 Mark Rypien; Running backs (RB): 20 Johnny Bailey; 36 Jerome Bettis; 25 Tyrone Montgomery; 31 Brent Moss; 28 Greg Robinson; Wide receivers (WR): 80 Isaac Bruce; 86 Jessie Hester; 81 Todd Kinchen; 18 J. T. Thomas KR; 19 Billy Williams; 89 Alexander Wright; Tight ends (TE): 88 Pat Carter; 47 Marv Cook; 84 Troy Drayton; 83 Lovell Pinkney; 87 Jim Price	Offensive linemen (OL): 77 Darryl Ashmore T; 71 Chuck Belin G; 61 Bern Brostek C; 70 Wayne Gandy T; 79 Leo Goeas G; 69 Jesse James C; 72 Clarence Jones T; 64 Keith Loneker G; 67 Dwayne White; 73 Zach Wiegert G/T; Defensive linemen (DL): 93 Kevin Carter DE; 75 D'Marco Farr DT; 90 Sean Gilbert DE; 98 Jimmie Jones DT; 65 Jon Kirksey DT; 95 Brad Ottis DE/DT; 60 Fred Stokes DE; 66 Corey Swinson DT; 96 Jay Williams DT; 76 Robert Young DE	Linebackers (LB): 52 Paschall Davis OLB; 53 Cedric Figaro MLB; 50 Dana Howard MLB; 51 Carlos Jenkins OLB; 58 Roman Phifer OLB; 59 Ashley Sheppard OLB; Defensive backs (DB): 29 Dexter Davis CB; 46 Torin Dorn CB; 41 Todd Lyght CB; 35 Keith Lyle FS; 23 Gerald McBurrows FS; 27 Anthony Parker CB; 32 Toby Wright SS; Special teams (ST): 4 Dean Biasucci K; 5 Sean Landeta P	Practice squad: 55 Paul Liggett MLB; Reserve: 56 Shane Conlan LB (IR); 57 Thomas Homco LB (IR); 9 Jamie Martin QB (PUP); 12 Chris Miller QB (IR); 21 John Reece CB (IR); 82 Jermaine Ross WR (IR); 22 Mike Scurlock CB/S (IR); 78 Jackie Slater T (IR); 53 active, 8 inactive Rookies in italics

== Preseason ==
Week	Date	Opponent	Result	Record	Venue	Attendance
1	August 5	at Seattle Seahawks	L 20–34	0–1	Kingdome	35,607
2	August 1	at Oakland Raiders	L 22–27	0–2	Oakland-Alameda County Coliseum	45,000 (est.)
3	August 18	at Jacksonville Jaguars	W 27-10	1-2	Jacksonville Municipal Stadium	70,000 (est.)
4	August 25	at San Diego Chargers	L 9-17	1–3	Jack Murphy Stadium	48,816

== Regular season ==
=== Schedule ===
Week	Date	Opponent	Result	Record	Venue	Recap
1	September 3	at Green Bay Packers	**W** 17–14	1–0	Lambeau Field	Recap
2	September 10	**New Orleans Saints**	**W** 17–13	2–0	Busch Memorial Stadium	Recap
3	September 17	at **Carolina Panthers**	**W** 31–10	3–0	Memorial Stadium	Recap
4	September 24	Chicago Bears	**W** 34–28	4–0	Busch Memorial Stadium	Recap
5	October 1	at Indianapolis Colts	**L** 18–21	4–1	RCA Dome	Recap
6	Bye					
7	October 12	**Atlanta Falcons**	**W** 21–19	5–1	Busch Memorial Stadium	Recap
8	October 22	**San Francisco 49ers**	**L** 10–44	5–2	Busch Memorial Stadium	Recap
9	October 29	at Philadelphia Eagles	**L** 9–20	5–3	Veterans Stadium	Recap
10	November 5	at **New Orleans Saints**	**L** 10–19	5–4	Louisiana Superdome	Recap
11	November 12	**Carolina Panthers**	**W** 28–17	6–4	Trans World Dome	Recap
12	November 19	at **Atlanta Falcons**	**L** 6–31	6–5	Georgia Dome	Recap
13	November 26	at **San Francisco 49ers**	**L** 13–41	6–6	3Com Park	Recap
14	December 3	at New York Jets	**W** 23–20	7–6	Giants Stadium	Recap
15	December 10	Buffalo Bills	**L** 27–45	7–7	Trans World Dome	Recap
16	December 17	Washington Redskins	**L** 23–35	7–8	Trans World Dome	Recap
17	December 24	Miami Dolphins	**L** 22–41	7–9	Trans World Dome	Recap
Note: Intra-division opponents are in **bold** text.

=== Game summaries ===
==== Week 1: at Green Bay Packers ====
Week 1: St. Louis Rams at Green Bay Packers

Quarter	1	2	3	4	Total
**Rams**	0	7	7	3	**17**
Packers	0	0	7	7	**14**

at Lambeau Field, Green Bay, Wisconsin

- Date: September 3, 1995
- Game time: 12:00 p.m. CST
- Game weather: Overcast, 69 °F (21 °C)
- Game attendance: 60,104
- TV announcers (FOX): Kenny Albert, Anthony Muñoz

Game information

**First quarter**

**Second quarter**

**Third quarter**

**Fourth quarter**

Top passers

- GB – Brett Favre – 29/51, 299 yards, 2 TD, 3 INT
- STL – Chris Miller – 19/30, 166 yards, 2 TD

Top rushers

- GB – Edgar Bennett – 10 rushes, 21 yards
- STL – Leonard Russell – 10 rushes, 36 yards

Top receivers

- GB – Mark Chmura – 7 receptions, 97 yards, 1 TD
- STL – Isaac Bruce – 4 receptions, 55 yards, 1 TD

==== Week 2: vs New Orleans Saints ====
Week 2: New Orleans Saints at St. Louis Rams

Quarter	1	2	3	4	Total
Saints	3	0	7	3	**13**
**Rams**	7	10	0	0	**17**

at Busch Stadium, St. Louis, Missouri

- Date: September 10, 1995
- Game time: 12:00 p.m. CST
- Game weather: Overcast, 65 °F (18 °C)
- Game attendance: 59,335
- TV announcers (FOX): Kevin Harlan, Jerry Glanville and Pam Oliver

Game information

**First quarter**

**Second quarter**

**Third quarter**

**Fourth quarter**

Top passers

- NOR – Jim Everett – 24/40, 247 yards, TD, INT
- STL – Chris Miller – 12/31, 188 yards, TD

Top rushers

- NOR – Mario Bates – 10 rushes, 74 yards
- STL – Jerome Bettis – 20 rushes, 83 yards

Top receivers

- NOR – Quinn Early – 5 receptions, 73 yards
- STL – Troy Drayton – 4 receptions, 80 yards

==== Week 3: at Carolina Panthers ====
Week Three: St. Louis Rams at Carolina Panthers

Quarter	1	2	3	4	Total
**Rams**	0	14	10	7	**31**
Panthers	0	3	0	7	**10**

at Memorial Stadium, Clemson, South Carolina

- Date: September 17
- Game time: 1:00 p.m. EDT
- Game weather: 73 °F (23 °C)
- Game attendance: 54,060
- TV announcers (FOX): Kenny Albert, Anthony Muñoz
- Box score

Game information

**First quarter**

- No scoring plays

**Second quarter**

- STL – Jerome Bettis 2-yard run (Steve McLaughlin kick). Rams 7–0.
- STL – Jessie Hester 23-yard pass from Chris Miller (Steve McLaughlin kick). Rams 14–0.
- CAR – John Kasay 45-yard field goal. Rams 14–3.

**Third quarter**

- STL – Anthony Parker 28-yard fumble return (Steve McLaughlin kick). Rams 21–3.
- STL – Steve McLaughlin 34-yard field goal. Rams 24–3.

**Fourth quarter**

- STL – Torin Dorn 24-yard interception return (Steve McLaughlin kick). Rams 31–3.
- CAR – Kerry Collins 1-yard run (John Kasay kick). Rams 31–10.

**Top passers**

- STL – Chris Miller – 15/26, 225 yards, TD
- CAR – Frank Reich – 8/19, 68 yards, INT

**Top rushers**

- STL – Jerome Bettis – 19 rushes, 67 yards, TD
- CAR – Vince Workman – 5 rushes, 48 yards

**Top receivers**

- STL – Isaac Bruce – 5 receptions, 100 yards
- CAR – Eric Guliford – 4 receptions, 53 yards

==== Week 4: vs Chicago Bears ====
Week 4: Chicago Bears at St. Louis Rams

Quarter	1	2	3	4	Total
Bears	0	21	0	7	**28**
**Rams**	10	7	14	3	**34**

at Busch Stadium, St. Louis, Missouri

- Date: September 24, 1995
- Game time: 12:00 p.m. CST
- Game weather: Overcast, 54 °F (12 °C)
- Game attendance: 59,679
- TV announcers (FOX): Joe Buck, Tim Green and Pam Oliver

Game information

**First quarter**

**Second quarter**

**Third quarter**

**Fourth quarter**

Top passers

- CHI – Erik Kramer – 27/38, 317 yards, 4 TD
- STL – Chris Miller – 21/31, 231 yards, 3 TD

Top rushers

- CHI – Rashaan Salaam – 16 rushes, 40 yards
- STL – Jerome Bettis – 22 rushes, 74 yards

Top receivers

- CHI – Jeff Graham – 6 receptions, 145 yards, TD
- STL – Troy Drayton – 8 receptions, 106 yards, TD

=== Standings ===
NFC West
	W	L	T	PCT	PF	PA	STK
^{(2)} San Francisco 49ers	11	5	0	.688	457	258	L1
^{(6)} Atlanta Falcons	9	7	0	.563	362	349	W1
St. Louis Rams	7	9	0	.438	309	418	L3
Carolina Panthers	7	9	0	.438	289	325	L1
New Orleans Saints	7	9	0	.438	319	348	W1
