= Henry Ellard =

American football player and coach (born 1961)

No. 80, 85, 17
- Position: Wide receiver

Personal information
- Born: July 21, 1961 (age 65); Fresno, California, U.S.
- Listed height: 5 ft 11 in (1.80 m)
- Listed weight: 180 lb (82 kg)

Career information
- High school: Herbert Hoover (Fresno)
- College: Fresno State (1979–1982)
- NFL draft: 1983: 2nd round, 32nd overall pick

Career history

Playing
- Los Angeles Rams (1983–1993); Washington Redskins (1994–1998); New England Patriots (1998)

Coaching
- Fresno State (2000) Assistant coach; St. Louis Rams (2001–2008) Wide receivers coach; New York Jets (2009–2011) Wide receivers coach; New Orleans Saints (2012–2014) Wide receivers coach; San Antonio Christian (2016–2021) Head coach

Awards and highlights
- As a player: 2× First-team All-Pro (1984, 1988); 3× Pro Bowl (1984, 1988, 1989); NFL receiving yards leader (1988); Second-team All-American (1982); Fresno State Bulldogs No. 83 retired

Career NFL statistics
- Receptions: 814
- Receiving yards: 13,777
- Receiving touchdowns: 65
- Stats at Pro Football Reference

Head coaching record
- Career: 16–39–1 (.295)

Henry Austin Ellard (born July 21, 1961) is an American former professional football player who was a wide receiver for the Los Angeles Rams (1983–1993), Washington Redskins (1994–1998), and New England Patriots (1998) of the National Football League (NFL). Nicknamed "Grasshopper", he played college football for the Fresno State Bulldogs. Ellard also qualified for the Olympic trials in 1992 in the triple jump, although he injured his hamstring during the Trials and did not make the team.

== Early life and college ==
Ellard attended Hoover High School in Fresno, California. He won the CIF California State Championships in the triple jump in 1979 For college, Ellard stayed in town and attended Fresno State University from 1979 to 1982 where he set an NCAA record with 1,510 receiving yards in his final season. In Fresno State history, Ellard is tied for third in touchdown catches (25), fifth in receiving yards (2,947) and 11th in receptions (138).

- 1979: 9 catches for 136 yards with 3 TD
- 1980: 28 catches for 493 yards with 3 TD.
- 1981: 39 catches for 808 yards with 4 TD.
- 1982: 61 catches for 1510 yards with 15 TD.

Ellard still holds the NCAA record for yards per catch in a season, 24.4, set while playing for Fresno State in 1982. His Quarterback was former Fresno State head coach Jeff Tedford.

Ellard was also an All-American triple jumper on the Fresno State track and field team. In 1982, he set and still holds the Fresno State school record in the triple jump at 55' 0.5".

== Professional career ==
=== Los Angeles (1983–1993) ===
Ellard was selected in the second round (32nd overall) of the 1983 NFL draft by the Los Angeles Rams. Ellard would have a carousel of quarterbacks to catch from in his time that ranged from Jeff Kemp to Jim Everett. In his rookie year, Ellard was used mostly in the field as a returner on kicks. He made 31 combined returns on punts and kicks for 531 yards with one touchdown. He also made 16 catches for 268 yards (on the depth chart, receivers like Mike Barber and Dickerson would get the catches and yards, although Ellard outclassed both in yards per catch). The 1983 season for the Rams ended up being buoyed by the draft picks made for Ellard alongside Eric Dickerson to result in nine wins. While Dickerson set rookie records in yards and other various categories, Ellard would play his part in helping to clinch a playoff spot in the final game of the regular season. Needing a win against the New Orleans Saints to clinch a wild card berth, the Rams would not score a single touchdown from their offense, but they still pulled off a nail-biting 26–24 win. Ellard returned a punt 72 yards for a touchdown (his first in his career) that was in the middle of a sudden 16-point upswing after trailing 7–0 early in the first quarter. For his part, Ellard made six combined punt and kick returns for 130 yards. In the playoffs, Ellard was used sparingly in the playoff run by the Rams. He made four total catches for 61 yards with 13 returns for 168 yards in two combined postseason games.

In the following year, Ellard would be used slightly more on the offensive side of the ball, starting each game of the season. He caught 34 total passes for 622 yards with six touchdowns, all of which were highs on the team. Ellard would score eight total touchdowns in the season, with a significant part of that being a four-game stretch from September 30 to October 22. In those four games, he caught a combined 6 passes for 134 total yards with three touchdowns while returning six punts for 207 yards and two touchdowns Ellard was selected as a punt returner for the Pro Bowl that year (alongside an All-Pro selection), having returned 30 punts for 403 yards and two touchdowns. The Rams made it back to the postseason once again with Ellard as a starter this time. He would catch 2 passes for 22 yards while returning 2 punts for 17 yards, but the Rams would lose 16–13.

The following year, Ellard kept improving (despite no selections from the press). He caught 54 passes for 811 yards and five touchdowns. He had his first 100-yard game of his career against the Atlanta Falcons on September 29, catching five passes for 123 yards and a touchdown. On punt returns, he made 37 of them for 501 yards and a touchdown. The Rams made it back to the playoffs once again. Ellard played a small key role in the Divisional Round game versus the Dallas Cowboys. He had a 23-yard punt return that would be followed by a 21-yard catch to eventually lead L.A. to the only points of the first half (a field goal). Ellard caught 2 passes for 33 yards while returning four punts for 37 yards while Dickerson and the Rams ran over Dallas 20–0. In the NFC Championship Game the following week, Ellard caught and returned just once as the Bears won 24–0. In the 1986 season, Ellard missed the first eight games before returning to catch 34 passes in eight starts for 447 yards and four touchdowns. In the strike plagued 1987 season, Ellard started in 12 of 15 games for the Rams. He caught 51 passes for 799 yards and three touchdowns.

In 1988, Ellard finally soared. He caught a career high 86 passes for a league-high 1,414 yards with ten touchdowns. His 88.4 yards per game also led the league. Ellard was awarded the NFC Offensive Player of the Month award for December, having caught 18 total passes for 298 yards and three touchdowns in three wins to help the Rams into the playoffs. He continued his run in 1989, although he played in fourteen games. He caught 70 passes for 1,382 yards for 8 touchdowns while leading the league again with 98.7 yards per game. He had the best game of his career in Week 2, catching 12 passes for 230 yards and three touchdowns against the Indianapolis Colts. Although Ellard led the team in receptions/yards/touchdowns once again, he was joined this time with Flipper Anderson to create a duo of 1,000 yard receivers, which they would do again the following year. Ellard finally had a playoff run to remember in 1989. His four catches for 87 yards with a touchdown was his best game to his career in the postseason (which was his eighth played), as the Rams charged to the NFC title game, with Ellard having a 100-yard game against the Giants. However, the San Francisco 49ers neutralized him for two catches on 18 yards in a 30–3 loss. Despite playing for nearly ten more years, Ellard had played his last postseason game, as the Rams were doomed to irrelevance for the rest of their tenure in the city.

Ellard continued on in 1990 at the start of the decline of the Rams. In 15 games he caught 76 passes for 1,294 yards for four touchdowns (ranking in the top five for the former two alongside yards per catch and game). For 1991, he caught 64 passes for 1,052 yards (his fourth straight) with three touchdowns, ranking in the top ten for yards per catch and per game. Ellard moved down in 1992 in every category to break a 1000-yard season. For the first time since his rookie year, Ellard did not lead the way in the receiving side, as Cleveland Gary had more catches (52) with equal touchdowns (although Ellard outfoxed him in yards). 1993 however proved somewhat better, as he caught over 60 passes for the fifth time in his last six seasons with 945 yards to lead the team in both categories. However, it would be his last season with the Rams, as he moved to the Washington Redskins. At the time of his move, Ellard held Rams' team records for career receptions (593), receiving yards (9,761), 100-yard games (26), punt return average (11.3), and total offense (11,663).

=== Career closure (1994–1998) ===
On a team that won just three games, Ellard caught 74 passes for 1,397 yards (102 behind league-leader Jerry Rice) to start a new run of 1,000 yard seasons while having six touchdowns. His 87.3 yards per game was the best since the 1990 season as he led the Redskins in catches, yards and touchdowns while catching from quarterbacks such as Heath Shuler. The next year, Ellard would flourish again as the best receiver for the team, catching 56 passes for 1,005 yards and five touchdowns. The 1996 year was his last impact season. Playing in each game, he caught 52 passes for 1,014 yards (leading the team once again) with two touchdowns, garnering his seventh 1,000 yard season while leading the league in yards per reception with 19.5. He clinched a 1,000 yard season in the final game against the Dallas Cowboys, catching 7 passes for 155 yards in the 37–10 win. Ellard played in 11 games to close his Redskins career in 1997, catching 32 passes for 485 yards (the lowest since 1986) with four touchdowns, as receivers like Jamie Asher and Brian Mitchell shone for the team in receiving (however, no one caught for 1,000 yards). Ellard moved on to the New England Patriots for 1998, although he was inactive for the first eight games. Ellard played in five games and caught five total passes before being shuttled to Washington for two games (catching two passes) before retirement. In total, he made seven appearances with seven catches with no touchdowns (the second time held with no scores in his career as a receiver, the first being his rookie year).

== Legacy ==
He retired after the 1998 season with 814 receptions for 13,777 yards, which placed him third on the all-time list, and 65 touchdowns. He also gained 1,527 yards returning punts, 364 yard returning kickoffs, 50 rushing yards, and 4 punts returned for a touchdown. Overall, he gained 15,718 total yards.

Despite Ellard's numbers, it took decades for him to even reach being a semifinalist for the Pro Football Hall of Fame. He believes this to be a consequence of the eventual move of the Rams to St. Louis, as well as his having caught passes from less stellar quarterbacks than similar receivers of his era. Curiously, his closest comparison among receiving leaders is in the Hall of Fame, as Ellard played six fewer games than Andre Reed (who entered the league in 1985 and retired after Ellard in 2000) but managed slightly more receiving yards (each had over 13,000) despite having a hundred fewer catches (Reed had 951 while Ellard had 814); Reed had more touchdowns and Pro Bowl selections while Ellard was named an All-Pro twice and led the league in receiving yards (as opposed to Reed doing neither of those things). Returns and run-happy offenses hampered Ellard for five years before he began to flourish as a receiver. At the time of his retirement in 1998, Ellard was sixth all-time in receptions. Each player above him is in the Hall of Fame, while only one other in the top ten (Irving Fryar, who eventually passed him) is not already inducted. Ellard also ranked third at the time of retirement for yards (between James Lofton and Steve Largent). All except him and Fryar in the top ten are in the Hall of Fame. Ellard became a semifinalist for the Hall of Fame the class of 2023, which is both his first time reaching this stage and his last year with the Modern Era class.

In the 1991 cult classic Nintendo Entertainment System (NES) video game Tecmo Super Bowl, Ellard is the only player besides Jerry Rice to have a Receptions Score of 81, the highest rating for all receivers in the game set during the 1990–91 NFL season.

== NFL career statistics ==
Legend
	Led the league
**Bold**	Career high

Year	Team	Games		Receiving					Rushing					Fumbles
Year	Team	GP	GS	Rec	Yds	Avg	Lng	TD	Att	Yds	Avg	Lng	TD	Fumbles
1983	LAR	12	0	16	268	16.8	44	0	**3**	7	2.3	12	0	2
1984	LAR	16	16	34	622	18.3	63T	6	**3**	-5	-1.7	5	0	4
1985	LAR	16	16	54	811	15.0	64T	5	**3**	8	2.7	**16**	0	**5**
1986	LAR	9	8	34	447	13.1	34T	4	1	-15	-15.0	-15	0	3
1987	LAR	12	12	51	799	15.7	**81T**	3	1	4	4.0	4	0	3
1988	LAR	16	15	86	**1,414**	16.4	68	**10**	1	7	7.0	7	0	3
1989	LAR	14	12	70	1,382	**19.7**	53	8	2	10	5.0	6	0	0
1990	LAR	15	15	**76**	1,294	17.0	50T	4	2	**21**	**10.5**	13	0	4
1991	LAR	16	16	64	1,052	16.4	38	3	—	—	—	—	—	1
1992	LAR	16	15	47	727	15.5	33T	3	—	—	—	—	—	0
1993	LAR	16	16	61	945	15.5	54	2	2	18	8.0	15	0	0
1994	WAS	16	16	74	1,397	18.9	73T	6	1	-5	-5.0	-5	0	1
1995	WAS	15	15	56	1,005	17.9	59	5	—	—	—	—	—	1
1996	WAS	16	16	52	1,014	19.5	51	2	—	—	—	—	—	0
1997	WAS	16	11	32	485	15.2	27	4	—	—	—	—	—	0
1998	WAS	5	0	2	29	14.5	19	0	—	—	—	—	—	0
1998	NWE	2	0	5	86	17.2	19	0	—	—	—	—	—	0
Career		228	199	814	13,777	16.9	81T	65	19	50	2.6	16	0	27

== Personal life ==
Henry Ellard is married to Lillian Ellard and they have three children together: Christiana, Alexandria and Adriana. Henry also has two children from a previous marriage: Henry Jr and Whitney.

== Coaching career ==
After his retirement, Ellard became an assistant coach at Southern California Christian High School, then became an assistant track-and-field coach at Villa Park High School. In 2000, he was a coach at Fresno State before taking the receivers coaching job for the St. Louis Rams in 2001. On January 25, 2009, Ellard came to the New York Jets as the wide receivers coach. He was named the wide receivers coach for the New Orleans Saints on March 14, 2012, and spent three seasons with the club before leaving after the 2014 season. He served as the head football coach at San Antonio Christian School from 2016 to 2021. The most notable players he coached were Torry Holt, Issac Bruce, Parker Johnson, Mason Norris, Alex King, Austin Hotchkiss, Brandon Trevino, and Drew Brees.

== Head coaching record ==
Year	Team	Regular season			
Year	Team	Won	Lost	Ties	Win%
2016	San; Antonio; Christian	5	6	0	.455
2017	San; Antonio; Christian	3	6	0	.333
2018	San; Antonio; Christian	2	7	1	.250
2019	San; Antonio; Christian	4	5	0	.444
2020	San; Antonio; Christian	1	7	0	.125
2021	San; Antonio; Christian	1	8	0	.111
Career		16	39	1	.295
