= 1991 Los Angeles Rams season =

NFL team season

- Owner: Georgia Frontiere
- Head coach: John Robinson
- Offensive coordinator: Ernie Zampese
- Defensive coordinator: Jeff Fisher
- Home stadium: Anaheim Stadium

Results
- Record: 3–13
- Division place: 4th NFC West
- Playoffs: Did not qualify

Uniform
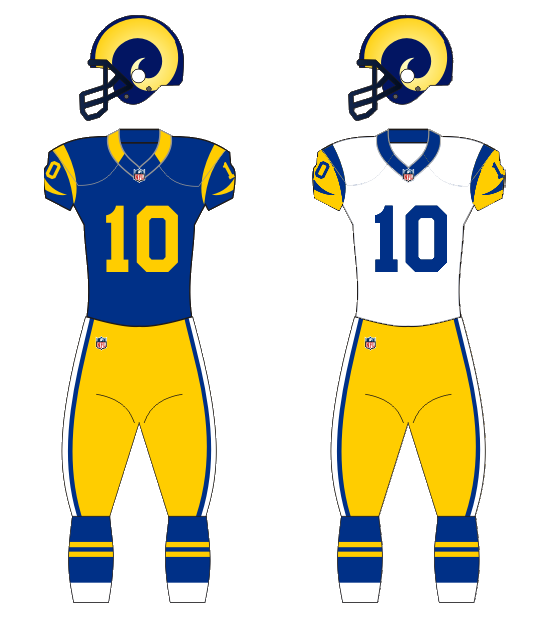

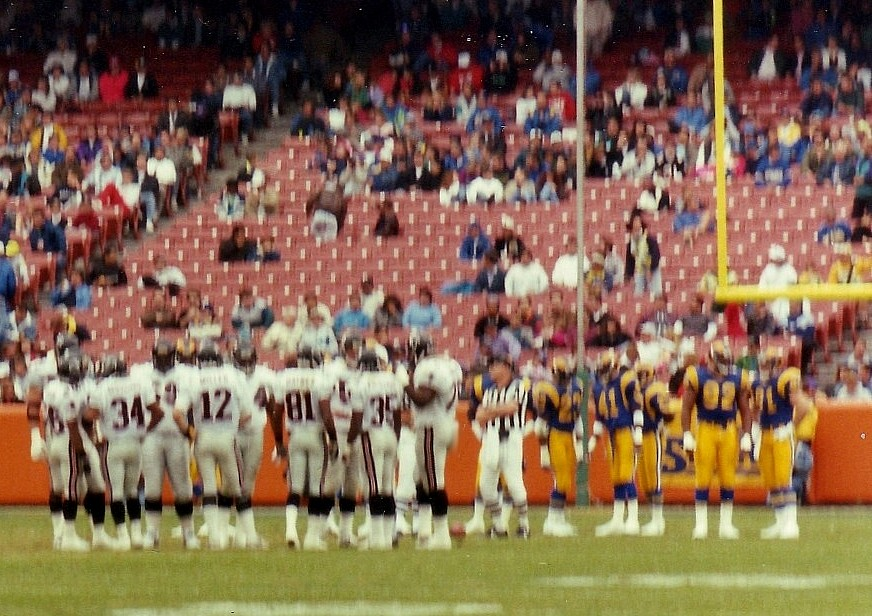
The Rams hosting the Atlanta Falcons at Anaheim Stadium in 1991

The 1991 Los Angeles Rams season was the team's 54th year with the National Football League and the 46th season in Los Angeles. The team was looking to improve on its 5–11 record from 1990. However, the Rams finished the 1991 season 3–13, tied for the second worst record in the NFL with the Cincinnati Bengals and the Tampa Bay Buccaneers. After splitting their first 6 games, the Rams lost their final 10 games of the season, their longest losing streak to end a season, beating the 1937 team based in Cleveland, who lost nine in a row to end that season. The 3–13 record was the worst for the Rams in Los Angeles for a 16-game schedule and tied the third-fewest victories posted by the team during its tenure in the city. This was also, at the time, the worst record for the Rams in a 16-game schedule overall (not including the 1982 strike-shortened season).

The 1991 Rams' pass defense surrendered 7.86 yards-per-pass attempt (including quarterback sacks), the fourth-most in the history of the league.

== Offseason ==
=== NFL draft ===
1991 Los Angeles Rams draft
Round	Pick	Player	Position	College	Notes
1	5	Todd Lyght *	Cornerback	Notre Dame	
2	31	Roman Phifer	Linebacker	UCLA	
4	107	Robert Bailey	Cornerback	Miami (FL)	
5	116	Robert Young	Defensive end	Mississippi State	
6	143	Neal Fort	Offensive tackle	BYU	
7	170	Tyrone Shelton	Running back	William & Mary	
8	201	Pat Tyrance	Linebacker	Nebraska	
9	228	Jeff Fields	Defensive tackle	Arkansas State	
11	281	Terry Crews	Linebacker	Western Michigan	
12	311	Jeff Pahukoa	Guard	Washington	
12	312	Ernie Thompson	Running back	Indiana	
Made roster * Made at least one Pro Bowl during career

== Personnel ==
=== Staff ===
1991 Los Angeles Rams staff
Front office: Owner/President – Georgia Frontiere; Executive Vice President – John Shaw; Senior Vice President – Jay Zygmunt; Administrator of Football Operations – Jack Faulkner; Director of player personnel – John Math; Head coaches: Head coach – John Robinson; Offensive coaches: Offensive coordinator – Ernie Zampese; Running Backs – Clarence Shelmon; Passing Game Coordinator/Wide Receivers – Jimmy Raye; Tight ends – Gil Haskell; Offensive line – Hudson Houck	Defensive coaches: Defensive coordinator – Jeff Fisher; Defensive line – Marv Goux; Defensive line – John Teerlinck; Linebackers – Ronnie Jones; Secondary – Tom Bettis; Defensive/Special Teams Assistant – Nolan Cromwell; Special teams coaches: Special teams – Gil Haskell; Strength and conditioning: Strength and conditioning – Garrett Giemont

=== Roster ===
1991 Los Angeles Rams roster
Quarterbacks (QB): 11 Jim Everett; 14 Mike Pagel; Running backs (RB): 39 Robert Delpino FB; 22 Marcus Dupree; 43 Cleveland Gary; 38 David Lang KR; 24 Buford McGee; 32 Ernie Thompson; Wide receivers (WR): 83 Flipper Anderson; 84 Aaron Cox; 80 Henry Ellard; 18 Jimmy Raye III; 82 Vernon Turner; Tight ends (TE): 88 Pat Carter; 86 Damone Johnson	Offensive linemen (OL): 61 Bern Brostek G; 72 Robert Jenkins T; 67 Duval Love G/T; 66 Tom Newberry C/G; 69 Jeff Pahukoa G; 78 Jackie Slater T; 56 Doug Smith C/G; Defensive linemen (DL): 79 Mike Charles DT; 75 Tom Gibson DE; 91 Kevin Greene DE/OLB; 97 Gerald Robinson DE/DT; 92 David Rocker DE; 77 Karl Wilson DE; 99 Alvin Wright DT; 76 Robert Young DT	Linebackers (LB): 59 Paul Butcher OLB; 51 Brett Faryniarz OLB; 52 Larry Kelm MLB; 55 Glenell Sanders MLB; 50 Frank Stams MLB; 53 Fred Strickland OLB; Defensive backs (DB): 25 Jerry Gray CB; 20 Darryl Henley CB/PR; 27 Sammy Lilly CB/S; 41 Todd Lyght CB; 26 Anthony Newman S; 23 Michael Stewart SS; 37 Pat Terrell FS; 21 Rodney Thomas DB; Special teams (ST): 9 Barry Helton P; 90 Mike McDonald LS; 10 Tony Zendejas K	Practice squad: 73 Neal Fort T; —- Frank Hartley TE; Reserve: 28 Robert Bailey CB (IR); 81 Ron Brown (IR); 70 Bill Hawkins DE (IR); 71 Joe Milinichik G (IR); 64 Gerald Perry T (IR); 58 Roman Phifer LB (IR); 95 Mike Piel DT (IR); 87 Jim Price TE (IR); 46 active, 8 inactive, 2 practice squad Rookies in italics

== Preseason ==
Week	Date	Opponent	Result	Record	Venue	Attendance
1	August 3	vs. Atlanta Falcons	L 17–38	0–1	Gator Bowl	66,531
2	August 12	San Diego Chargers	W 24–3	1–1	Anaheim Stadium	41,616
3	August 17	Seattle Seahawks	L 7–23	1–2	Anaheim Stadium	47,834
4	August 22	vs. Houston Oilers	L 13–16	1–3	Liberty Bowl Memorial Stadium	63,200

== Regular season ==
=== Schedule ===
Week	Date	Opponent	Result	Record	Venue	Attendance
1	September 1	Phoenix Cardinals	**L** 14–24	0–1	Anaheim Stadium	47,069
2	September 8	at New York Giants	**W** 19–13	1–1	Giants Stadium	76,541
3	September 15	at **New Orleans Saints**	**L** 7–24	1–2	Louisiana Superdome	68,583
4	September 22	at **San Francisco 49ers**	**L** 10–27	1–3	Candlestick Park	63,871
5	September 29	Green Bay Packers	**W** 23–21	2–3	Anaheim Stadium	54,736
6	Bye					
7	October 13	San Diego Chargers	**W** 30–24	3–3	Anaheim Stadium	47,433
8	October 20	at Los Angeles Raiders	**L** 17–20	3–4	Los Angeles Memorial Coliseum	85,102
9	October 27	at **Atlanta Falcons**	**L** 14–31	3–5	Atlanta–Fulton County Stadium	50,187
10	November 3	**New Orleans Saints**	**L** 17–24	3–6	Anaheim Stadium	58,713
11	November 10	Kansas City Chiefs	**L** 20–27	3–7	Anaheim Stadium	52,511
12	November 17	at Detroit Lions	**L** 10–21	3–8	Pontiac Silverdome	60,873
13	November 25	**San Francisco 49ers**	**L** 10–33	3–9	Anaheim Stadium	61,881
14	December 1	Washington Redskins	**L** 6–27	3–10	Anaheim Stadium	55,027
15	December 8	**Atlanta Falcons**	**L** 14–31	3–11	Anaheim Stadium	35,315
16	December 15	at Minnesota Vikings	**L** 14–20	3–12	Hubert H. Humphrey Metrodome	61,518
17	December 22	at Seattle Seahawks	**L** 9–23	3–13	Kingdome	51,100
Note: Intra-division opponents are in **bold** text.

=== Game summaries ===
==== Week 1: vs Phoenix Cardinals ====
Week 1: Phoenix Cardinals at Los Angeles Rams – Game summary

Quarter	1	2	3	4	Total
**Cardinals**	14	7	0	3	**24**
Rams	0	7	7	0	**14**

at Anaheim Stadium, Anaheim, California

- Date: September 1
- Game time: 1:00 p.m. PST/2:00 p.m. MST
- Game weather: 67 °F (19 °C)
- Game attendance: 47,069
- Box Score

Game information

**First quarter**

- PHO – Eric Hill 85-yard fumble return (Greg Davis kick). Cardinals 7–0.
- PHO – Ernie Jones 28-yard pass from Tom Tupa (Greg Davis kick). Cardinals 14–0.

**Second quarter**

- LA – Robert Delpino 1-yard run (Tony Zendejas kick). Cardinals 14–7.
- PHO – Tom Tupa 1-yard run (Greg Davis kick). Cardinals 21–7.

**Third quarter**

- LA – Robert Delpino 1-yard run (Tony Zendejas kick). Cardinals 21–14.

**Fourth quarter**

- PHO – Greg Davis 32-yard field goal. Cardinals 24–14.

**Top passers**

- PHO – Tom Tupa – 10/18, 124 yards, TD
- LA – Jim Everett – 25/35, 290 yards, 2 INT

**Top rushers**

- PHO – Anthony Thompson – 29 rushes, 60 yards
- LA – Robert Delpino – 15 rushes, 81 yards, 2 TD

**Top receivers**

- PHO – Ricky Proehl – 5 receptions, 69 yards
- LA – Henry Ellard – 7 receptions, 116 yards

==== Week 7: vs San Diego Chargers ====
Week Seven: San Diego Chargers at Los Angeles Rams – Game summary

Quarter	1	2	3	4	Total
Chargers	7	7	7	3	**24**
Rams	0	16	7	7	**30**

at Anaheim Stadium, Los Angeles, California

- Date: October 13
- Game time: 1:00 p.m. PDT
- Game weather: 68 °F (20.0 °C), relative humidity 81%, wind 7 miles per hour (11 km/h; 6.1 kn)
- Game attendance: 47,433
- Referee: Gordon McCarter
- TV announcers (NBC): Joel Meyers and Dan Hampton
- Box score

Game information

**First quarter**

- SDG – Anthony Miller 30-yard pass from John Friesz (John Carney kick), 8:51. Chargers 7–0. **Drive: 9 plays, 82 yards, 6:09.**

**Second quarter**

- RAM – Jim Price 18-yard pass from Jim Everett (Tony Zendejas kick), 11:25. Tied 7–7. **Drive: 8 plays, 80 yards, 4:29.**
- SDG – Nate Lewis 49-yard pass from John Friesz (John Carney kick), 8:38. Chargers 14–7. **Drive: 4 plays, 62 yards, 2:47.**
- RAM – Robert Delpino 1-yard run (Tony Zendejas kick), 0:19. Tied 14–14. **Drive: 14 plays, 80 yards, 8:19.**
- RAM – Safety, Kevin Greene tackled Marion Butts in end zone, 0:00. Rams 16–14.

**Third quarter**

- RAM – Robert Delpino 1-yard run (Tony Zendejas kick), 4:10. Rams 23–14. **Drive: 11 plays, 85 yards, 7:53.**
- SDG – Rod Bernstine 1 yard run (John Carney kick), 0:11. Rams 23–21. **Drive: 7 plays, 80 yards, 3:59.**

**Fourth quarter**

- RAM – Jim Price 12-yard pass from Jim Everett (Tony Zendejas kick), 11:27. Rams 30–21. **Drive: 6 plays, 87 yards, 3:44.**
- SDG – John Carney 27-yard field goal, 3:38. Rams 30–24. **Drive: 12 plays, 80 yards, 5:06.**

**Top passers**

- SDG – John Friesz – 21/33, 306 yards, 2 TD, INT
- RAM – Jim Everett – 19/25, 219 yards, 2 TD

**Top rushers**

- SDG – Rod Bernstine – 9 rushes, 57 yards, TD
- RAM – Robert Delpino – 17 rushes, 50 yards, 2 TD

**Top receivers**

- SDG – Anthony Miller – 7 receptions, 149 yards, TD
- RAM – Jim Price – 6 receptions, 82 yards, 2 TD

==== Week 12: at Detroit Lions ====
Week Twelve: Los Angeles Rams at Detroit Lions – Game summary

Quarter	1	2	3	4	Total
Rams	3	0	7	0	**10**
**Lions**	0	7	0	14	**21**

at Pontiac Silverdome, Pontiac, Michigan

- Date: November 17
- Game time: 4:00 p.m. EST
- Game weather: None (played indoors)
- Game attendance: 60,873
- Referee: Bernie Kukar
- TV announcers (CBS): Verne Lundquist and Dan Fouts
- Box score

In a game against the Lions, Lions offensive lineman Mike Utley suffered an injury to his sixth and seventh cervical vertebrae occurred on November 17, 1991. Utley flashed the crowd a "thumbs up" as he was being taken off the field.

==== Week 17: at Seattle Seahawks ====
Week Seventeen: Seattle Seahawks vs. Los Angeles Rams – Game summary

Quarter	1	2	3	4	Total
Rams	3	6	0	0	**9**
**Seahawks**	0	7	16	0	**23**

at Kingdome, Seattle

- Date: December 22
- Game time: 5:04 pm local
- Game weather: indoors
- Game attendance: 51,100
- Referee: Jerry Markbreit
- TV announcers (ESPN): Mike Patrick & Joe Theismann
- Gamebook

Game information

**First quarter**

- LA – Tony Zendejas 44-yard field goal, 1:02 (LA 3–0)

**Second quarter**

- LA – Tony Zendejas 46-yard field goal, 9:08 (LA 6–0)
- SEA – Mike Tice 4-yard pass from Dave Krieg (John Kasay kick), 1:28 (SEA 7–6)
- LA – Tony Zendejas 50-yard field goal, 0:06 (LA 9–7)

**Third quarter**

- SEA – John Kasay 35-yard field goal, 12:11 (SEA 10–9)
- SEA – James Jones 1-yard run (John Kasay kick), 9:10 (SEA 17–9)
- SEA – James Jones 6-yard run (PAT failed), 5:51 (SEA 23–9)

**Fourth quarter**

- No scoring plays

**Top passers**

- LA – Jim Everett: 12/27, 118 yds, 2 INT
- SEA – Dave Krieg: 13/27, 164 yds, 1 TD, 2 INT

**Top rushers**

- LA – Cleveland Gary: 16 car, 72 yds
- SEA – James Jones: 10 car, 50 yds, 2 TD

**Top receivers**

- LA – Henry Ellard: 3 rec, 43 yds
- SEA – Brian Blades: 6 rec, 85 yds

**Team** – pass – rush – total – to

- LA – 131 – 96 – 227 – 3
- SEA – 156 – 97 – 253 – 3

=== Standings ===
NFC West
	W	L	T	PCT	DIV	CONF	PF	PA	STK
^{(3)} New Orleans Saints	11	5	0	.688	4–2	8–4	341	211	W2
^{(6)} Atlanta Falcons	10	6	0	.625	5–1	7–5	361	338	L1
San Francisco 49ers	10	6	0	.625	3–3	7–5	393	239	W6
Los Angeles Rams	3	13	0	.188	0–6	2–10	234	390	L10

== Awards and honors ==
- Jim Everett, NFC Pro Bowl selection

== See also ==
Other Anaheim–based teams in 1991

- California Angels (Anaheim Stadium)
  - 1991 California Angels season
