= Flipper Anderson =

American football player (born 1965)

No. 83, 84
- Position: Wide receiver

Personal information
- Born: March 7, 1965 (age 61); Philadelphia, Pennsylvania, U.S.
- Listed height: 6 ft 0 in (1.83 m)
- Listed weight: 175 lb (79 kg)

Career information
- High school: Paulsboro (Paulsboro, New Jersey)
- College: UCLA
- NFL draft: 1988: 2nd round, 46th overall pick

Career history
- Los Angeles Rams (1988–1994); Indianapolis Colts (1995); Washington Redskins (1996); Denver Broncos (1997)

Awards and highlights
- Super Bowl champion (XXXII); NFL record: Most receiving yards in a game (336)

Career NFL statistics
- Receptions: 267
- Receiving yards: 5,357
- Receiving touchdowns: 28
- Stats at Pro Football Reference

Willie Lee "Flipper" Anderson Jr. (born March 7, 1965) is an American former professional football player who was a wide receiver in the National Football League (NFL), primarily with the Los Angeles Rams. He played college football for the UCLA Bruins and was selected by the Rams in the second round of the 1988 NFL draft. Anderson played in the NFL for the Rams (1988–1994), the Indianapolis Colts (1995), the Washington Redskins (1996), and the Denver Broncos (1997). As a Bronco, he was a member of their Super Bowl XXXII championship team. As a Ram, he set the NFL record for most receiving yards in a game with 336 against the Saints on November 26, 1989.

== Early life ==
Anderson was born in Philadelphia, Pennsylvania. He played high school football at Paulsboro High School in southern New Jersey and was one of the nation's top high school football recruits of the Class of 1983.

== College career ==
Anderson played college football at UCLA, where he was a receiving target for quarterback Troy Aikman.

In his time at UCLA, Anderson had eight games with at least 100 receiving yards. His eight games reaching the mark were the most in school history at the time of his departure to the NFL.

== Professional career ==
Pre-draft measurables
Height	Weight	Hand span	40-yard dash	10-yard split	20-yard split	20-yard shuttle	Vertical jump	Broad jump	Bench press
5 ft 11 5/8 in (1.82 m)	169 lb (77 kg)	9 1/2 in (0.24 m)	4.45 s	1.57 s	2.60 s	4.31 s	35.5 in (0.90 m)	9 ft 9 in (2.97 m)	4 reps

=== Los Angeles Rams ===
Anderson was drafted by the Los Angeles Rams in the second round (46th overall) of the 1988 NFL draft. He was the seventh wide receiver to be selected that year.

==== 1988 season ====
In his rookie season, Anderson finished with 11 receptions for 319 receiving yards in 1988. He was part of a crowded receiving unit that contained Pro Bowler Henry Ellard.

==== 1989 season ====
In Week 4, against the San Francisco 49ers, Anderson scored his first professional touchdown on a 65-yard reception in the 13–12 victory. He finished the season with a career-high 1,146 yards off just 44 receptions, giving him an league-leading average of 26 yards per reception. Anderson is currently the last player to average 25 yards per reception while recording a 1,000 receiving yard season. Anderson and Henry Ellard combined to be a 1,000-yard receiving duo for the Rams.

===== Record-breaking game =====
Anderson set the National Football League record for most receiving yards and yards from scrimmage in a game, with 336 yards on 15 receptions with a 22.4 yards per reception average, during the 12th week of the 1989 season in a 20–17 overtime victory over the New Orleans Saints. Forty of those yards came in overtime. He broke the previous mark of 309 yards, set by Stephone Paige of the Kansas City Chiefs, in 1985. He was named NFC Offensive Player of the Week for his record-breaking game.

===== 1989 postseason =====
On January 7, 1990, during a Divisional Round game, the Rams won the coin toss after taking the New York Giants to overtime. The Rams drove 77 yards in four plays, the last being a 30-yard touchdown pass to Anderson, who caught the ball in the end zone and ran directly through the tunnel and into the locker room. He caught two touchdown passes in that 19–13 win.

==== 1990 season ====
Anderson had four games with at least 100 receiving yards in the 1990 season. In the 1990 season, Anderson finished with 51 receptions for 1,097 receiving yards and four receiving touchdowns. For the second consecutive season, he led the NFL in yards per reception. In addition, Anderson and Ellard gave the Rams' a 1,000-yard receiving duo for back-to-back seasons.

==== 1991 season ====
Anderson was inactive for four games with a back injury. In the 1991 season, Anderson appeared in 12 games and finished with 32 receptions for 530 receiving yards and one receiving touchdown.

==== 1992 season ====
From Weeks 12–15, Anderson recorded a receiving touchdown in four consecutive games. In the 1992 season, Anderson appeared in 15 games and recorded 38 receptions for 657 receiving yards and seven receiving touchdowns. He led the Rams in receiving touchdowns.

==== 1993 season ====
In the 1993 season, Anderson finished with 37 receptions for 552 receiving yards and four receiving touchdowns in 15 games. He tied for the team lead in receiving touchdowns with Troy Drayton.

==== 1994 season ====
In Week 2, against the Atlanta Falcons, Anderson had five receptions for 154 receiving yards and one receiving touchdown in the 31–13 loss. In the 1994 season, Anderson finished with 46 receptions for 945 receiving yards and five receiving touchdowns. He led the team in receiving yards and receiving touchdowns.

=== Indianapolis Colts ===
The Colts signed Anderson as a free agent before the 1995 season.

==== 1995 season ====
In the 1995 season opener for the Colts, Anderson scored two touchdowns in the 24–21 loss to the Cincinnati Bengals. Anderson suffered a knee injury in Week 2, which sidelined him for the rest of the season. The Colts later waived Anderson.

=== Washington Redskins ===
During the 1996 season, the Redskins signed Anderson. He only appeared in two games and recorded no statistics.

=== Denver Broncos ===
Anderson joined the Broncos for the 1997 season. He appeared in four games and recorded no statistics. He won a Super Bowl title when the Broncos defeated the Green Bay Packers in Super Bowl XXXII.

Anderson finished his career with 267 receptions for 5,357 yards and 28 touchdowns, giving him a 20.1 career yards per catch average.

== NFL career statistics ==
Legend
	Led the league
**Bold**	Career best

Year	Team	Games		Receiving					Rushing					Fum
Year	Team	GP	GS	Rec	Yds	Avg	Lng	TD	Att	Yds	Avg	Lng	TD	Fum
1988	LA	**16**	0	11	319	**29.0**	56	0	0	0	0.0	0	0	0
1989	LA	**16**	13	44	**1,146**	26.0	**78**	5	**1**	−1	−1.0	−1	0	0
1990	LA	**16**	13	**51**	1,097	21.5	55	4	**1**	**13**	**13.0**	**13**	0	0
1991	LA	12	10	32	530	16.6	54	1	0	0	0.0	0	0	**2**
1992	LA	15	9	38	657	17.3	51	**7**	0	0	0.0	0	0	1
1993	LA	15	15	37	552	14.9	56	4	0	0	0.0	0	0	0
1994	LA	**16**	**16**	46	945	20.5	72	5	**1**	11	11.0	11	0	0
1995	IND	2	2	8	111	13.9	28	2	0	0	0.0	0	0	0
1996	WAS	2	0	0	0	0.0	0	0	0	0	0.0	0	0	0
1997	DEN	4	0	0	0	0.0	0	0	0	0	0.0	0	0	0
Career		114	78	267	5,357	20.1	78	28	3	23	7.7	13	0	3

== Personal life ==
Anderson lives in Suwanee, Georgia and is a high school basketball referee. His son, Dres Anderson, played wide receiver for the Utah Utes. His other son, Seth, plays wide receiver for the Iowa Hawkeyes.
