= Todd Lyght =

American football player and coach (born 1969)

Southern Jaguars
- Title: Defensive coordinator

Personal information
- Born: February 9, 1969 (age 57); Kwajalein, TTPI
- Listed height: 6 ft 0 in (1.83 m)
- Listed weight: 190 lb (86 kg)

Career information
- High school: Powers Catholic (Flint, Michigan, U.S.)
- College: Notre Dame
- NFL draft: 1991: 1st round, 5th overall pick

Career history

Playing
- Los Angeles / St. Louis Rams (1991–2000); Detroit Lions (2001–2002)

Coaching
- Bishop Gorman High School (2009–2010) Defensive backs assistant coach; Oregon (2011–2012) Defensive intern; Philadelphia Eagles (2013–2014) Assistant defensive backs coach; Notre Dame (2015–2019) Defensive backs coach; Southern (2026–present) Defensive coordinator

Awards and highlights
- Super Bowl champion (XXXIV); Second-Team All-Pro (1999); Pro Bowl (1999); Unanimous All-American (1989); Consensus All-American (1990)

Career NFL statistics
- Interceptions: 37
- Interception yards: 462
- Touchdowns: 4
- Stats at Pro Football Reference

Todd William Lyght (born February 9, 1969) is an American professional football coach and former player. He is currently the defensive coordinator for the Southern Jaguars. Lyght played college football for the Notre Dame Fighting Irish, twice earning consensus All-American honors. He later was a cornerback for 12 seasons in the National Football League (NFL).

Lyght played in the NFL from 1991 to 2002, finishing with 37 interceptions and four touchdowns. His best year as a pro came during the 1999 season with the Super Bowl champion St. Louis Rams, with whom he intercepted six passes for 112 yards and one touchdown and was named to the 1999 All-Pro and Pro Bowl teams. After his playing career, he became an assistant coach. He was a defensive backs coach for his alma mater Notre Dame.

== Early life ==
Lyght was born in Kwajalein, Marshall Islands, which was then part of the US-administered Trust Territory of the Pacific Islands. His father was in the U.S. Army. Lyght attended Powers Catholic High School in Flint, Michigan, where he lettered twice as a wide receiver and cornerback. As a senior, he served as a team captain and caught 38 passes for 877 yards with nine touchdowns, and also intercepted 19 passes. Lyght also lettered three times in track and field. His high school coach, Todd Tucker, claimed that Lyght was cut from freshman football. This was stated during a Power's Catholic High School pep-rally in 1996.

== College career ==
Lyght played collegiate football for the University of Notre Dame, where he was a two-time consensus All-American (1989 and 1990). He was a three-year starter at cornerback and was voted as a team captain his senior season.

He had more playing time in 1987 than any other freshman, making 29 tackles, causing one fumble, breaking up two passes and making one interception. Lyght was named a starter for his sophomore season, and led team in tackles in the 1989 Fiesta Bowl win over West Virginia. That victory capped an undefeated season for Notre Dame, leading to a #1 ranking in both the AP and coach's polls. As a result, the 1988 Notre Dame Fighting Irish football team was named the consensus national champion.

As a junior in 1989, he intercepted eight passes (two shy of school record) and registered 47 total tackles (27 solo). He ranked eighth in final NCAA standings in 1989 for interceptions and was a finalist for 1989 Jim Thorpe Award. Lyght finished his college career with 161 tackles; caused one fumble; broke up 20.5 passes; had 11 interceptions for 55 return yards and one touchdown. He also played in 1991 Hula Bowl.

== Professional career ==
=== Pre-draft ===
The overall consensus amongst NFL draft analysts and scouts considered Lyght as the top defensive back prospect and the unanimously projected Lyght to be selected within the first five draft picks in the 1991 NFL Draft. The majority of draft analysts projected the Atlanta Falcons would select Lyght third overall. Other mock drafts publicized projected the Cleveland Browns would select him with the second overall pick. NFL draft analysts with the New York Times, Sports Illustrated, and ESPN had Lyght ranked as the top defensive back prospect in the draft. He received an invitation to attend the 1991 NFL Draft event and originally planned to attend with his teammate from Notre Dame Rocket Ismail who was the consensus No. 1 overall pick. The Dallas Cowboys traded for the first overall pick in order to secure the acquisition of Rocket Ishmael, but failed contract negotiations led to Ishmael signing with the Toronto Argonauts of the CFL.

Pre-draft measurables
Height	Weight	Arm length	Hand span	40-yard dash	10-yard split	20-yard split	Vertical jump	Broad jump	Bench press
6 ft 0 in (1.83 m)	186 lb (84 kg)	30 1/2 in (0.77 m)	9 1/4 in (0.23 m)	4.54 s	1.62 s	2.62 s	35 1/2 in (0.90 m)	10 ft 3 in (3.12 m)	15 reps
All values from NFL Combine

=== Los Angeles/St. Louis Rams ===
==== 1991 NFL draft ====
The Los Angeles Rams selected Lyght in the first round (5th overall) of the 1991 NFL draft. NFL draft analysts and scouts projected Lyght would be selected second overall by the Cleveland Browns or third overall by the Atlanta Falcons. He was unanimously considered to be the top defensive back prospect in the 1991 NFL Draft and was predicted to be the first defensive back drafted.

“For the past two, three weeks we’ve been going through all the scenarios, the what-if situations. To be honest, Lyght’s name never really came up because we just assumed that he would be gone in that second pick to Cleveland.”

— Jeff Fisher
(Rams’ defensive coordinator)

Unfortunately, the Cleveland Browns instead chose to select safety Eric Turner with the second overall pick. The majority of draft analysts projected the Atlanta Falcons would select Lyght third overall in order to pair him with Deion Sanders, but unexpectedly decided to select Nebraska cornerback Bruce Pickens instead. The Falcons traded Pickens after two underwhelming seasons as a backup, leading him being considered by many as possibly the worst first round pick in franchise history.

“He was, in most people’s view, rated either the second or third-best player in the draft, and to have him be there for our pick was most fortunate for us and we’re very excited about it.”

— John Robinson
(LA Rams’ head coach)

==== 1991 season ====
On August 16, 1991, the Los Angeles Rams signed Lyght to a five—year, $5.45 million rookie contract that included an initial signing bonus of $2.35 million following a training camp holdout.

He was inactive for the first two games (Weeks 1–2) of the season due to a hip injury. Upon joining the active roster, Lyght was named a backup and listed as the third cornerback on the depth chart behind starters Jerry Gray and Darryl Henley. On September 15, 1991, Lyght made his professional regular season debut as the Rams lost 14–24 to the Phoenix Cardinals. He missed another two games (Weeks 7–8) due to a sprained ankle. Entering Week 10, defensive coordinator Jeff Fisher promoted Lyght to the No. 2 starting cornerback, supplanting Jerry Gray. On November 25, 1991, Lyght recorded four solo tackles, a pass deflection, and intercepted a pass Steve Bono threw to wide receiver Jerry Rice during a 33–10 loss to the San Francisco 49ers. In Week 15, he set a season-high with eight solo tackles during a 14–31 loss against the Atlanta Falcons. He finished his rookie season with 39 combined tackles (32 solo), three pass deflections, and one interception in 11 games and 8 starts. On December 19, 1991, the Rams fired head coach John Robinson after finishing with a 3–13 record.

==== 1992 season ====
The Los Angeles Rams selected cornerback Steve Israel in the second round (30th overall) of the 1992 NFL draft. Head coach Chuck Knox named Lyght the No. 1 starting cornerback to begin the season alongside Darryl Henley following the departure of Jerry Gray.

On September 13, 1992, Lyght set a season-high with ten combined tackles (nine solo), set a career-high with eight pass deflections, and intercepted two pass attempts by Hugh Millen as the Rams defeated the New England Patriots 0–14. His performance earned him NFC Defensive Player of the Week. In Week 3, Lyght suffered a dislocated shoulder during a 10–26 loss at the Miami Dolphins. On September 22, 1992, the Rams officially placed Lyght on injured reserve due to his shoulder injury and he subsequently remained inactive for the next four games (Weeks 3–6). In Week 11, he made nine combined tackles (eight solo) and four pass deflections during a 27–23 victory at the Dallas Cowboys. He finished the 1992 NFL season with 67 combined tackles (61 solo), 22 pass deflections, and three interceptions in 12 games and 12 starts.

==== 1993 season ====
Head coach Chuck Knox retained Lyght as the No. 1 starting cornerback to begin the season and paired him with Darryl Henley. Prior to Week 6, Lyght would start alongside Steve Israel for the rest of the season after Darryl Henley would be granted indefinite leave from the team, remaining inactive following charges of drug trafficking. On October 24, 1993, he set a season-high with 11 combined tackles (ten solo) and made one pass deflection, and intercepted a pass Rodney Peete threw to Herman Moore during a 13–16 loss to the Detroit Lions. In Week 11, Lyght made six solo tackles, one pass deflection, and intercepted a pass Bobby Hebert threw to wide receiver Michael Haynes during a 13–0 loss to the Atlanta Falcons. During pre-game warmups, Lyght sustained what he initially believed to be a bruised knee, but opted to play. On November 21, 1993, the Rams officially placed Lyght on injured reserve for the rest of the season due to his knee injury as he had to undergo surgery to repair cartilage damage. He finished the season with 43 combined tackles (40 solo), nine pass deflections, ana three interceptions in nine games and nine starts.

==== 1994 season ====
During training camp, the Rams re-signed Darryl Henley after releasing him following his indictment in a federal drug case for trafficking cocaine. Head coach Chuck Knox named Lyght and Steve Israel the starting cornerbacks to begin the season. Darryl Henley would begin starting in place of Steve Israel in Week 2 due to Israel dealing with knee tendinitis.

On September 4, 1994, Lyght started in the Los Angeles Rams' home-opener against the Arizona Cardinals and made seven combined tackles (six solo), a pass deflection, and returned a fumble linebacker Joe Kelly forced by fullback Larry Centers for 74–yards to score the first touchdown of his career as they won 12–14. In Week 10, he set a season-high with ten solo tackles and made one pass break-up during a 27–31 loss at the San Francisco 49ers. He started in all 16 games throughout the 1994 NFL season and recorded 90 combined tackles (78 solo), 13 pass deflections, one interception, a fumble recovery, and one touchdown.

==== 1995 season ====
On January 10, 1995, the Los Angeles Rams fired head coach Chuck Knox after a 4–12 record the previous season. The Rams' team president John Shaw also confirmed the team would possibly move. The following week, the Rams officially confirmed their immediate move from Los Angeles, California to St. Louis, Missouri. On February 11, 1995, the St. Louis Rams hired Rich Brooks to be their new head coach. Lyght returned to training camp slated as the No. 1 starting cornerback under defensive coordinator Willie Shaw. Head coach Rich Brooks named Lyght the No. 1 starting cornerback to begin the season and paired him with Anthony Parker following the departures of Darryl Henley and Steve Israel.

On September 3, 1995, Lyght started in the Rams' season-opener at the Green Bay Packers and set a season-high with nine combined tackles (eight solo) and two pass deflections as they won 17–14. In Week 2, Lyght recorded seven combined tackles (five solo), one pass deflection, and had the first pick-six of his career after intercepting a pass attempt thrown by Jim Everett and returning it 29–yards for a touchdown during a 13–17 win against the New Orleans Saints. In Week 11, he recorded three solo tackles, tied his season-high with two pass deflections, and intercepted a pass by Kerry Collins as the Rams defeated the Carolina Panthers 17–28. He started in all 16 games and made 84 combined tackles (75 solo), 11 pass deflections, four interceptions, a forced fumble, and one touchdown.

==== 1996 season ====
On February 17, 1996, the St. Louis Rams designated Lyght with their transition tag, making him a restricted free agent and allowing them the opportunity to retain him by matching any contract offers made by any other teams. On April 12, 1996, the Jacksonville Jaguars submitted an offer sheet to sign Lyght with a five–year, $10.50 million contract that included $4.00 million guaranteed. The Rams were given seven days to match or purpose a better offer.

On April 15, 1996, the St. Louis Rams re-signed Lyght to a new five–year $10.70 million contract that included $4.00 million guaranteed and an initial signing bonus of $2.31 million. He returned as the No. 1 starting cornerback to begin the season alongside Anthony Parker.

On September 29, 1996, Lyght set a career-high with 17 combined tackles (13 solo) and had one pass break-up during a 28–31 overtime loss at the Arizona Cardinals. In Week 9, Lyght made four solo tackles, two pass deflections, and returned an interception thrown by Vinny Testaverde for a 25–yard touchdown during a 31–37 loss at the Baltimore Ravens. In Week 16, he recorded six combined tackles (four solo), two pass deflections, and intercepted a pass by Bobby Hebert during a 34–27 victory at the Atlanta Falcons. On December 26, 1996, the St. Louis Rams fired head coach Rich Brooks after they ended the season with a 6–10 record. He started in all 16 games throughout the season and recorded 89 combined tackles (73 solo), 19 pass deflections, five interceptions, and one touchdown.

==== 1997 season ====
On January 20, 1997, the St. Louis Rams hired Dick Vermeil to be their new head coach. The Rams selected cornerback Dexter McCleon in the second round (41st overall) of the 1997 NFL draft and also signed cornerback Ryan McNeil during free agency. Defensive coordinator Bud Carson retained Lyght as the No. 1 starting cornerback and paired him with Ryan McNeil following the departure of Anthony Parker.

In Week 8, he set a season-high with 14 combined tackles (11 solo) and made two pass deflections during a 9–17 loss to the Seattle Seahawks. On December 7, 1997, Lyght recorded six solo tackles, three pass deflections, made his first career sack, and led the Rams to a 34–27 victory at the New Orleans Saints by intercepting a pass by Billy Joe Hobert midway through the fourth quarter while the game was tied 27–27. During the second quarter, he recorded the first sack of his career on Hobert for a seven–yard loss. He started all 16 games throughout the season and recorded 85 combined tackles (72 solo), 16 pass deflections, four interceptions, two fumble recoveries, a forced fumble, and one sack.

==== 1998 season ====
Head coach Dick Vermeil promoted John Bunting and Peter Giunta to co-defensive coordinators after Bud Carson retired due to health concerns. Lyght retained his role as the No. 1 starting cornerback to begin the season and was paired with Dexter McCleon. In Week 4, he set a season-high with seven solo tackles during a 17–20 loss to the Arizona Cardinals. Entering Week 5, head coach Dick Vermeil demoted Dexter McCleon and named Ryan McNeil the No. 2 starting cornerback, alongside Lyght, for the rest of the season. On December 13, 1998, Lyght recorded five solo tackles, set a season-high with three pass deflections, and intercepted a pass Drew Bledsoe threw to Terry Glenn as the Rams defeated the New England Patriots 18–24. He started in all 16 games throughout the season for the fifth season in-a-row and recorded 71 combined tackles (58 solo), 13 pass deflections, three interceptions, two forced fumbles, and 1½ sacks.

==== 1999 season ====
The St. Louis Rams selected cornerback Dre Bly in the second round (41st overall) of the 1999 NFL draft in order to replace Ryan McNeil following his departure. Head coach Dick Vermeil retained Lyght and Dexter McCleon as the starting cornerbacks to begin the season. On September 12, 1999, Lyght started in the Rams' home-opener against the Baltimore Ravens and set a season-high with eight solo tackles, three pass deflections, one sack, and intercepted a pass attempt thrown by Scott Mitchell during a 10–27 victory. In Week 10, he made four solo tackles, one pass deflection, and returned an interception on a pass Steve Beuerlein threw to wide receiver Patrick Jeffers for a 57–yard touchdown as the Rams defeated the Carolina Panthers 10–35. In Week 14, Lyght made three combined tackles (two solo), one pass deflection, and set a career-high with his sixth interception of the season on a pass Billy Joe Tolliver threw to wide receiver Keith Poole during a 30–14 victory at the New Orleans Saints. He started in all 16 games for the sixth consecutive season and finished with 72 combined tackles (59 solo), 13 pass deflections, a forced fumble, and one touchdown. He set career-highs in interceptions (6) and sacks (2.5). His performance earned him a selection to first-team All-Pro and he was also named to the 2000 Pro Bowl, marking the first and only Pro Bowl selection of his career.

The St. Louis Rams finished the 1999 NFL season first in the NFC West with a 13–3 record and earned a first-round bye. The team was highlighted with high-powered offense known as the "Greatest Show on Turf". On January 16, 2000, Lyght started in his first career playoff game and recorded eight combined tackles (six solo) and made two pass deflections during a 49–37 victory against the Minnesota Vikings in the NFC Divisional Round. On January 23, 2000, Lyght started in the NFC Championship Game and made three combined tackles (two solo), one pass deflection, and intercepted a pass Shaun King threw to wide receiver Karl Williams as they defeated the Tampa Bay Buccaneers 6–11. On January 30, 2000, Lyght started in Super Bowl XXXIV and recorded three combined tackles (two solo), a pass deflection, and blocked a field goal attempt as they defeated the Tennessee Titans 23–16.

==== 2000 season ====
On February 10, 2000, the St. Louis Rams re-signed Lyght to a one–year, $4.04 million contract. Following the retirement of Dick Vermeil, the Rams promoted offensive coordinator Mike Martz to head coach. Lyght returned as the No. 1 starting cornerback and was paired with Dexter McCleon.

On September 10, 2000, Lyght made five combined tackles (four solo), one pass deflection, and secured the Rams' 37–34 victory at the Seattle Seahawks by intercepting a pass Jon Kitna threw to wide receiver James Williams with eight seconds remaining. He was inactive for two games (Weeks 10–11) due to a hamstring injury, ending a streak of 103 consecutive starts. In Week 13, he set a season-high with seven combined tackles (six solo) and made two pass deflections during a 24–31 loss against the New Orleans Saints. He finished the 2000 NFL season with 58 combined tackles (52 solo), nine pass deflections, two interceptions, one forced fumble, and one sack in 14 games and 12 starts. Following the 2000 NFL season, Lyght became an unrestricted free agent and was notified by the St. Louis Rams that they would not be offering a contract to re-sign him. He received interest from multiple teams, including the New York Giants, Kansas City Chiefs, and the Detroit Lions.

=== Detroit Lions ===
==== 2001 season ====
On April 12, 2001, the Detroit Lions signed Lyght to a two–year, $2.50 million contract that included a signing bonus of $1.12 million. Although Lyght received interest from other teams he elected to sign with his hometown team, the Detroit Lions. He entered training camp slated as the No. 2 starting cornerback, replacing Bryant Westbrook who was recovering from a ruptured Achilles tendon. Head coach Marty Mornhinweg named Lyght and Terry Fair the starting cornerbacks to begin the season.

In Week 5, he set a season-high with six combined tackles (five solo), one pass deflection, and intercepted a pass Daunte Culpepper threw to Randy Moss during a 26–31 loss at the Minnesota Vikings. On November 18, 2001, Lyght recorded five solo tackles, set a season-high with three pass deflections, and intercepted a pass Jake Plummer attempted to throw to David Boston during a 38–45 loss at the Arizona Cardinals. On December 16, 2001, he recorded two solo tackles, tied his season-high of three pass deflections, and had a pick-six after he intercepted a pass Todd Bouman threw to wide receiver Chris Walsh and returned it 59–yards for a touchdown during a 24–27 victory against the Minnesota Vikings. He started in all 16 games throughout the 2001 NFL season, recording 59 combined tackles (53 solo), nine pass deflections, four interceptions, and one touchdown.

==== 2002 season ====
On January 7, 2002, the Detroit Lions fired defensive coordinator Vince Tobin after they finished the 2001 season with a 2–14 record. On January 29, 2002, the Lions named Kurt Schottenheimer their new defensive coordinator. The Detroit Lions selected cornerbacks André Goodman in the third round (68th overall) and Chris Cash in the sixth round (175th overall) of the 2002 NFL draft. Head coach Marty Mornhinweg named Lyght the No. 1 starting cornerback to begin the season and paired him with Eric Davis. Following a hamstring injury to Eric Davis, rookie Chris Cash was promoted to the No. 2 starting cornerback beginning in Week 3.

In Week 6, he set a season-high with 11 combined tackles (8 solo) during a 24–31 loss at the Minnesota Vikings. In Week 14, Lyght recorded nine combined tackles (eight solo), set a season-high with three pass deflections, and intercepted a pass Jake Plummer threw to wide receiver Kevin Kasper during a 20–23 loss at the Arizona Cardinals. Head coach Marty Mornhinweg decided to name rookie cornerback André Goodman a starting cornerback beginning in Week 15 in order to gain experience as the Lions had a 3–10 record. Lyght was demoted to nickelback for the remainder of the season. On December 29, 2002, Lyght played in the final game of his career and recorded six combined tackles (five solo) and scored a touchdown late in the fourth quarter during a 39–36 loss against the Minnesota Vikings. He recovered the ball after defensive tackle Shaun Rogers blocked a 43–yard field goal attempt by Gary Anderson and returned it 75–yards for a touchdown. His touchdown earned him the NFL record for being the oldest player to return a blocked field goal for a touchdown (33 years, 323 days). He finished his last season with a career-high 99 combined tackles (84 solo), 18 pass deflections, and two interceptions in 16 games and 14 starts. On December 30, 2002, Lyght officially announced his retirement.

== Career stats ==
Year	Team	Games	Combined tackles	Tackles	Assisted tackles	Sacks	Forced fumbles	Fumble recoveries	Fumble return yards	Interceptions	Interception return yards	Yards per interception return	Longest interception return	Interceptions returned for touchdown	Passes defended
1991	LOS	12	0	0	0	0.0	0	1	0	1	0	0	0	0	0
1992	LOS	12	0	0	0	0.0	0	0	0	3	80	27	39	0	0
1993	LOS	9	43	40	3	0.0	0	1	0	2	0	0	0	0	9
1994	LOS	16	85	73	12	0.0	0	1	0	1	14	14	14	0	13
1995	STL	16	81	71	10	0.0	1	0	0	4	34	9	29	1	11
1996	STL	16	82	69	13	0.0	0	0	0	5	43	9	25	1	19
1997	STL	16	85	72	13	1.0	2	2	0	4	25	6	13	0	16
1998	STL	16	66	53	13	1.5	2	0	0	3	30	10	17	0	11
1999	STL	16	65	53	12	2.5	1	0	0	6	112	19	57	1	13
2000	STL	14	53	47	6	1.0	1	0	0	2	21	11	21	0	8
2001	DET	16	59	53	6	0.0	0	1	0	4	72	18	59	1	9
2002	DET	16	99	84	15	0.0	0	0	0	2	31	16	31	0	17
Career		175	718	615	103	6.0	7	6	0	37	462	12	59	4	126

== Coaching career ==
Lyght began a career in coaching in 2009, following several years of working in private business and as a football analyst on radio. His first position was as an assistant football coach at Bishop Gorman High School in Summerlin, Nevada on the staff of head coach Tony Sanchez. While on staff, the team won back-to-back state championships in 2009 and 2010.

In 2011, Lyght joined the staff at the University of Oregon as a defensive intern under head coach Chip Kelly. Lyght was initially contacted about the open position by Ducks defensive coordinator Nick Aliotti, who happened to be an assistant coach with the Rams during Lyght's playing days.

Lyght was named assistant defensive backs coach for the Philadelphia Eagles of the NFL in 2013. The hiring reunited him with Eagles head coach Chip Kelly, who had departed Oregon for the Eagles following the 2012 season.

Following the 2014 season, Lyght was hired by Vanderbilt to be their cornerbacks coach.

In February 2015, Lyght was hired by the University of Notre Dame to replace Kerry Cooks as defensive backs coach. During his tenure as an assistant coach at Notre Dame, the Irish had a record of 47–17. In January 2021 Notre Dame football was placed on probation for one year over recruiting violations due to Lyght having impermissible contact with a player at his high school and also sending 10 impermissible text messages to a 2021 recruit before it was allowed under NCAA rules.

== Personal life ==
Lyght established a series of scholarships at St. Mary's Elementary (Alexandria, Virginia), Powers Catholic High School, and the University of Notre Dame. In 1995, he donated $50,000 to the United Negro College Fund as part of NFL's Golden Circle.
