= Tony Lomack =

American football player (born 1968)

No. 82, 84
- Position: Wide receiver

Personal information
- Born: April 27, 1968 (age 58); Tallahassee, Florida, U.S.
- Listed height: 5 ft 8 in (1.73 m)
- Listed weight: 180 lb (82 kg)

Career information
- High school: Tallahassee (FL) Leon
- College: Florida
- NFL draft: 1990: 9th round, 245th overall pick

Career history
- Los Angeles Rams (1990); Phoenix Cardinals (1991); Dallas Cowboys (1992)*
- * Offseason or practice squad member only
- Stats at Pro Football Reference

Tony Lomack (born April 27, 1968) is an American former professional football wide receiver. He played for the Los Angeles Rams in 1990 and the Phoenix Cardinals in 1991. He was selected by the Rams in the ninth round of the 1990 NFL draft.
