= J. T. Thomas (wide receiver) =

American football player (born 1971)

No. 18, 87, 83
- Positions: Wide receiver, return specialist

Personal information
- Born: December 15, 1971 (age 54); San Bernardino, California, U.S.
- Listed height: 5 ft 10 in (1.78 m)
- Listed weight: 180 lb (82 kg)

Career information
- High school: San Bernardino (California)
- College: Arizona State
- NFL draft: 1995: 7th round, 240th overall pick

Career history
- St. Louis Rams (1995–1998); Atlanta Falcons (1999)*; Denver Broncos (2000)*
- * Offseason or practice squad member only

Career NFL statistics
- Receptions: 34
- Receiving yards: 400
- Stats at Pro Football Reference

Johnny Le'Mon Thomas (born December 15, 1971) is an American former professional football player who was a wide receiver for four seasons with the St. Louis Rams of the National Football League (NFL). He was selected by the St. Louis Rams in the seventh round of the 1995 NFL draft. He played college football at San Bernardino Valley College before transferring to the Arizona State Sun Devils.

== Early life and college ==
Johnny Le'Mon Thomas was born on December 15, 1971, in San Bernardino, California. He attended San Bernardino High School in San Bernardino.

Thomas first played college football at San Bernardino Valley College from 1991 to 1992. He then transferred to Arizona State University, where he lettered for the Arizona State Sun Devils in 1993, accumulating 34 receptions for 574 yards and three touchdowns and six rushing attempts for 105 yards and one touchdown. He was listed as ineligible in 1994.

== Professional career ==
Thomas was selected by the St. Louis Rams in the seventh round, with the 240th overall pick, of the 1995 NFL draft. He officially signed with the team on June 16. He played in 15 games, starting one, for the Rams during his rookie year in 1995, catching five passes for 42 yards and returning 32 kicks for 752 yards. He appeared in all 16 games, starting one, in 1996, recording seven receptions for 46 yards and 30 kick returns for 643 yards. Thomas played in only four games in 1997, totaling two catches for 25 yards and five kick returns for 97 yards. He became a free agent after the season and re-signed with the team on February 13, 1998. He appeared in all 16 games during his final season with the Rams in 1998, catching 20 passes for 287 yards and returning four kicks for 79 yards. He became a free agent after the 1998 season.

Thomas signed with the Atlanta Falcons on August 10, 1999, but was later released on August 30, 1999.

Thomas was signed by the Denver Broncos on May 8, 2000. He was released in June 2000.
