= Jesse James (center) =

American football player (born 1971)

No. 69, 70
- Position: Center

Personal information
- Born: September 16, 1971 (age 55); Mobile, Alabama, U.S.
- Listed height: 6 ft 4 in (1.93 m)
- Listed weight: 311 lb (141 kg)

Career information
- High school: Lillie B. Williamson (Mobile)
- College: Mississippi State
- NFL draft: 1995: 2nd round, 62nd overall pick

Career history
- St. Louis Rams (1995–1996); Memphis Maniax (2001)

Awards and highlights
- Third-team All-American (1994); First-team All-SEC (1994)

Career NFL statistics
- Games played: 2
- Stats at Pro Football Reference

Jesse James (born September 16, 1971) is an American former professional football player who was a center in the National Football League (NFL). He played college football for the Mississippi State Bulldogs and was selected in the second round of the 1995 NFL draft with the 65th overall pick. He played two games for the St. Louis Rams from 1995 to 1996.
