= Troy Drayton =

American football player (born 1970)

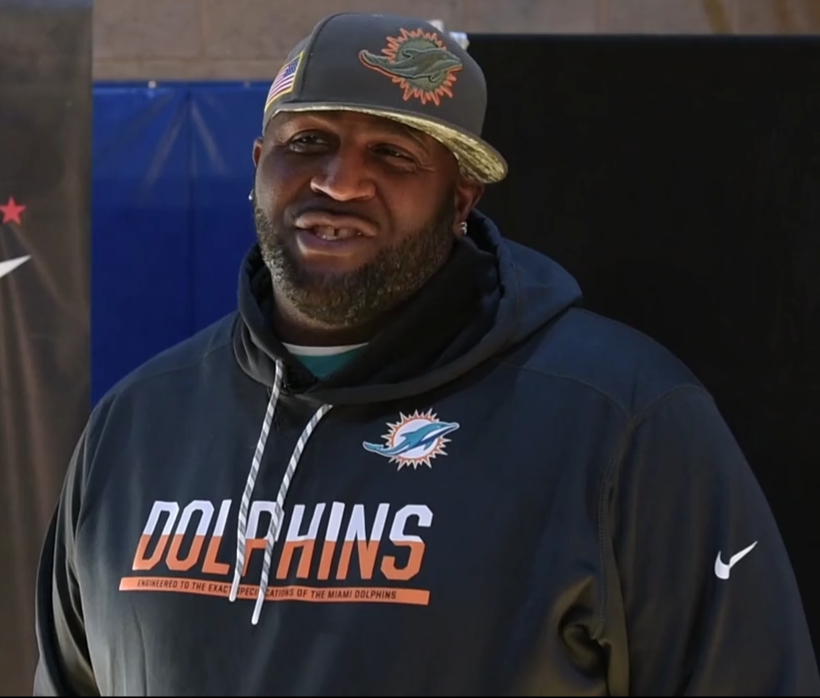
- Drayton in 2018

No. 84, 87
- Position: Tight end

Personal information
- Born: June 29, 1970 (age 56); Steelton, Pennsylvania, U.S.
- Listed height: 6 ft 3 in (1.91 m)
- Listed weight: 260 lb (118 kg)

Career information
- High school: Steelton-Highspire
- College: Penn State
- NFL draft: 1993: 2nd round, 39th overall pick

Career history
- Los Angeles/St. Louis Rams (1993–1996); Miami Dolphins (1996-1999); Oakland Raiders (2000)*; Kansas City Chiefs (2000); Green Bay Packers (2001)*
- * Offseason or practice squad member only

Awards and highlights
- Third-team All-American (1992)

Career NFL statistics
- Receptions: 243
- Receiving yards: 2,645
- Receiving touchdowns: 24
- Stats at Pro Football Reference

Troy Anthony Drayton (born June 29, 1970) is an American former professional football player who was a tight end for nine season in the National Football League (NFL) from 1993 to 2001, primarily for the Los Angeles/St. Louis Rams and the Miami Dolphins. He was selected by the Rams in the second round of the 1993 NFL draft. He played college football for the Penn State Nittany Lions from 1989 to 1992, earning third-team All-American homors in 1992. He currently resides in Coral Springs, Florida.

== NFL career statistics ==
Legend
**Bold**	Career high

=== Regular season ===
Year	Team	Games		Receiving				
Year	Team	GP	GS	Rec	Yds	Avg	Lng	TD
1993	RAM	16	2	27	319	11.8	27	4
1994	RAM	16	16	32	276	8.6	22	**6**
1995	STL	16	16	**47**	458	9.7	31	4
1996	STL	3	3	2	11	5.5	6	0
1996	MIA	10	10	26	320	12.3	**51**	0
1997	MIA	16	15	39	**558**	**14.3**	30	4
1998	MIA	15	15	30	334	11.1	35	3
1999	MIA	14	13	32	299	9.3	26	1
2000	KAN	16	1	8	70	8.8	21	2
Career		122	91	243	2,645	10.9	51	24

=== Playoffs ===
Year	Team	Games		Receiving				
Year	Team	GP	GS	Rec	Yds	Avg	Lng	TD
1997	MIA	1	1	1	8	**8.0**	8	0
1998	MIA	1	1	**3**	**20**	6.7	**10**	0
1999	MIA	1	0	1	2	2.0	2	0
Career		3	2	5	30	6.0	10	0
