= Brad Fichtel =

American football player (born 1970)

No. 68, 64
- Position: Center

Personal information
- Born: March 10, 1970 (age 56); Aurora, Illinois, U.S.
- Listed height: 6 ft 2 in (1.88 m)
- Listed weight: 285 lb (129 kg)

Career information
- High school: Oswego (Oswego, Illinois)
- College: Eastern Illinois
- NFL draft: 1993: 7th round, 179th overall pick

Career history
- Los Angeles Rams (1993–1994); Washington Redskins (1995)*; Memphis Mad Dogs (1995)
- * Offseason or practice squad member only

Career NFL statistics
- Games played: 1
- Stats at Pro Football Reference

Brad Alan Fichtel (born March 10, 1970) is an American former professional football player who was a center for the Los Angeles Rams of the National Football League (NFL). He played college football for the Eastern Illinois Panthers and was inducted into the school's Hall of Fame in 2014.

He was selected by the Los Angeles Rams in the 1993 NFL draft and was on the team for two years. He played one game in his career, a week ten victory over the Denver Broncos in 1994. He attended football camp for the Washington Redskins in 1995, and almost joined the Dallas Cowboys in 1996, but failed a physical.

Since then he became a physical education teacher in Heath, Texas, and was a finalist for NFL Teacher of the Year in 2012. He got his Master of Science in education at Canisius College in 2016. In 2018, he transitioned to the Rockwall Independent School District.

Fichtel is married to Suzanne, a former assistant district attorney in Rockwall, Texas. They have three sons. one who is following in his father's footsteps continuing his football career at Eastern Illinois
