= Cleveland Gary =

American football player (born 1966)

No. 43, 32
- Position: Running back

Personal information
- Born: May 4, 1966 (age 60); Stuart, Florida, U.S.
- Listed height: 6 ft 0 in (1.83 m)
- Listed weight: 226 lb (103 kg)

Career information
- High school: South Fork (Stuart)
- College: Georgia; Miami (FL)
- NFL draft: 1989: 1st round, 26th overall pick

Career history
- Los Angeles Rams (1989–1993); Miami Dolphins (1994); St. Louis Rams (1995)*
- * Offseason or practice squad member only

Awards and highlights
- NFL rushing touchdowns co-leader (1990); National champion (1987); Third-team All-American (1988)

Career NFL statistics
- Rushing yards: 2,645
- Rushing average: 3.9
- Rushing touchdowns: 24
- Receptions: 135
- Receiving yards: 874
- Receiving touchdowns: 5
- Stats at Pro Football Reference

Cleveland Everette Gary (born May 4, 1966), also known as Cleveland Edward Gary, is an American former professional football player who was a running back in the National Football League (NFL). He played college football for the Georgia Bulldogs and Miami Hurricanes. Gary was selected in the first round of the 1989 NFL draft by the Los Angeles Rams. He led the NFL in touchdowns in 1990 with 14. In 1992 he rushed for 1,125 yards and caught 52 passes.

== Early life ==
Gary attended South Fork High School, where he played baseball and football. In baseball, he was a shortstop for the South Fork Bulldogs. Against Martin County High School, he hit a 450 ft home run over the center field wall, which is the longest in the school's history. In football, he was named a Parade Magazine High School Football All-American. In his senior season, he rushed for 2,100 yards and scored 30 touchdowns. He was a recruited athlete coming out of high school.

== College career ==
Gary began his college career at the University of Georgia, where in his first start as a true freshman against Clemson he rushed for 101 yards and scored two touchdowns. After his freshman year at Georgia, he made the cover of Inside Sports Magazine and was touted as the best running back in the SEC as a true freshman. After his freshman season at Georgia he transferred to the University of Miami, where he became a first-team All-American and set a school record for most catches (57) ever in a single season by a running back that stills stands. He was voted MVP of the Senior Bowl. Gary also played one season of college baseball for the Hurricanes.

== Professional career ==
Gary was selected in the first round by the Los Angeles Rams with the 26th pick of the 1989 NFL draft.

Gary was offered a six-figure baseball contract from the Atlanta Braves in 1989. He played one season of minor league baseball with the rookie-level Bradenton Expos as a left fielder and designated hitter. Gary displayed tremendous power as a hitter.

In 2007, Gary became part owner of the National Indoor Football League, a professional indoor football organization that ran for several seasons in the 2000s.

== NFL career statistics ==
Year	Team	GP	Att	Yds	Avg	Lng	TD	Rec	Yds	Avg	Lng	TD
1989	LAR	10	37	163	4.4	18	1	2	13	6.5	8	0
1990	LAR	15	204	808	4.0	48	14	30	150	5.0	22	1
1991	LAR	10	68	245	3.6	14	1	13	110	8.5	22	0
1992	LAR	16	279	1,125	4.0	63	7	52	293	5.6	22	3
1993	LAR	15	79	293	3.7	15	1	36	289	8.0	60	1
1994	MIA	2	7	11	1.6	4	0	2	19	9.5	11	0
Career		68	674	2,645	3.9	63	24	135	874	6.5	60	5
