= T. J. Rubley =

American gridiron football player (born 1968)

No. 12
- Position: Quarterback

Personal information
- Born: November 29, 1968 (age 57); Davenport, Iowa, U.S.
- Listed height: 6 ft 3 in (1.91 m)
- Listed weight: 212 lb (96 kg)

Career information
- High school: West (Davenport)
- College: Tulsa
- NFL draft: 1992: 9th round, 228th overall pick

Career history
- Los Angeles Rams (1992–1994); Green Bay Packers (1995); Denver Broncos (1996)*; Philadelphia Eagles (1996)*; Denver Broncos (1996); Rhein Fire (1997); Winnipeg Blue Bombers (1998); Hamilton Tiger-Cats (1998)
- * Offseason or practice squad member only

Awards and highlights
- World League Offensive MVP (1997); All-World League (1997)

Career NFL statistics
- Passing attempts: 195
- Passing completions: 112
- Completion percentage: 57.4%
- TD–INT: 8–7
- Passing yards: 1,377
- Passer rating: 78.1
- Stats at Pro Football Reference

Career CFL statistics
- Pass attempts: 257
- Pass completions: 148
- Percentage: 57.6
- Passing yards: 1,504
- TD–INT: 4–12

Theron Joseph Rubley (born November 29, 1968) is an American former professional football player who was a quarterback in the National Football League (NFL), World League of American Football (WLAF), and the Canadian Football League (CFL) during the 1990s. He played for the Los Angeles Rams, Green Bay Packers, and Denver Broncos of the NFL, the Rhein Fire of the WLAF, and the Winnipeg Blue Bombers and Hamilton Tiger-Cats of the CFL.

== Early life ==
Rubley was a first-team all-state selection for Davenport West High School in Davenport, Iowa, where he completed 253 of 490 passes (51.6 percent) for 4,009 yards and 32 touchdowns in three seasons from 1984 to 1986.

== College career ==
Rubley played collegiately at the University of Tulsa in 47 games from 1987 to 1991. He was a member of the Gamma Upsilon Chapter of Pi Kappa Alpha. During his career, he threw for 9,324 yards and 73 touchdowns, while also being intercepted 54 times. Rubley added 1 rushing touchdown as well. In his time with Tulsa, the Golden Hurricane posted a 26-31 record, culminating with a 10-2 season in 1991 and victory in the Freedom Bowl over San Diego State. During his final college season, Rubley compiled a career-best 139.2 efficiency rating, good enough for sixteenth in the nation.

== Professional career ==
Rubley was selected by the Los Angeles Rams in the ninth round (228th pick overall) of the 1992 NFL draft. He spent his rookie season as the team's inactive third quarterback.

Rubley saw action in two NFL seasons in 1993 and 1995. He started seven games for the Rams during the 1993 season. With limited playing time and being waived numerous times by NFL teams, Rubley found success with the Rhein Fire of the WLAF and played briefly with Hamilton Tiger-Cats and Winnipeg Blue Bombers of the CFL.

His most infamous NFL moment, leading to his being cut from the team, came as a Green Bay Packer in a 1995 game against the Minnesota Vikings. Both starting quarterback Brett Favre and back-up quarterback Ty Detmer got injured in the game, but the Packers and Vikings were tied 24–24 with less than a minute to go and the Packers with the ball on the Minnesota 38-yard line.

On 3rd-and-1, coach Mike Holmgren called for a quarterback sneak. However, Rubley, the only remaining quarterback for the Packers, audibled and called a roll-out. He passed the ball and it was quickly intercepted, giving Minnesota the ball and eventually, the win.

After the game, an incredulous Holmgren commented, "I called a quarterback sneak. He [Rubley] changed the play. He thought he had the choice." Packers General Manager Ron Wolf was equally livid, commenting, "I can't believe this. I think we've exhausted ways to lose here." Rubley himself said, "It was not a real good decision." Rubley was cut later that week, and never appeared in another NFL game, although he was on the Denver Broncos roster the following season.

== Post-football career ==
Rubley served as a consultant for the film The Replacements, specifically coaching Keanu Reeves in his role as the starting quarterback for the fictional Washington Sentinels.
