= Pat Carter =

American football player and coach (born 1966)

No. 80, 85, 87, 88
- Position: Tight end

Personal information
- Born: August 1, 1966 (age 60); Sarasota, Florida, U.S.
- Listed height: 6 ft 4 in (1.93 m)
- Listed weight: 268 lb (122 kg)

Career information
- High school: Riverview (Sarasota)
- College: Florida State
- NFL draft: 1988: 2nd round, 32nd overall pick

Career history

Playing
- Detroit Lions (1988); Los Angeles Rams (1989–1993); Houston Oilers (1994); St. Louis Rams (1995); Arizona Cardinals (1996–1997)

Coaching
- St. Louis Rams (OA, 2004–2005); Detroit Lions (TE, 2006)

Awards and highlights
- Second-team All-American (1987); First Team All-South Independent (1986)

Career NFL statistics
- Receptions: 107
- Receiving yards: 1,117
- Touchdowns: 9
- Stats at Pro Football Reference

Pat Carter (born August 1, 1966) is an American former professional football player who was a tight end in the National Football League (NFL) from 1988 to 1998. He played college football for the Florida State Seminoles before playing in the NFL for the Detroit Lions, Los Angeles / St. Louis Rams, Houston Oilers, and Arizona Cardinals.

Pat Carter entered his third NFL season with Head Coach Rod Marinelli's coaching staff. He returned to Detroit as the Lions’ tight ends coach in 2006 after originally being drafted as a tight end out of Florida State by the Lions in the second round (32nd overall) of the 1988 NFL draft.

Before joining the Lions staff, Carter served as an offensive assistant in St. Louis for the 2005 season after working as a coaching intern for the Rams in 2004.

After playing his rookie season with the Lions (1988), Carter moved on to spend the bulk of his pro career with the Rams (1989–93, 1995) after he was traded by the Lions to the Rams in August 1989 for a fourth-round pick in the 1990 draft. He also played one season with the Houston Oilers (1994) and finished his 10-year career with Arizona (1996–97). Carter, who earned first-team All-America honors by The Sporting News as a senior at Florida State, played in 154 NFL games and had 107 career receptions for 1,117 yards and nine touchdowns. His best pro season was in 1996 when he registered 26 receptions for 329 yards and a touchdown with the Cardinals.
