= List of Los Angeles Rams award winners =

This page details the awards won by the players of the Los Angeles Rams, a professional American football team. The Rams were formerly based in St. Louis (1995–2015) and Cleveland (1936–1942, 1944–1945), as well as Los Angeles (1946–1994, 2016–present).

== Individual league awards ==
=== Coach of the Year: (6) ===
1945: Adam Walsh
1952: Hamp Pool
1967: George Allen
1973: Chuck Knox
1999: Dick Vermeil
2017: Sean McVay

=== Most Valuable Player: (6) ===
1939: Parker Hall HB
1945: Bob Waterfield QB
1969: Roman Gabriel QB
1999: Kurt Warner QB
2000: Marshall Faulk RB
2001: Kurt Warner QB
2025: Matthew Stafford QB

=== Defensive Rookie of the Year: (4) ===
1962: Merlin Olsen DT
1971: Isiah Robertson LB
2014: Aaron Donald DT
2024: Jared Verse LB

=== Offensive Rookie of the Year: (4) ===
1983: Eric Dickerson RB
1993: Jerome Bettis RB
2010: Sam Bradford QB
2015: Todd Gurley RB

=== Defensive Player of the Year: (4) ===
1967: Deacon Jones DE NEA
1968: Deacon Jones DE, NEA
1975: Jack Youngblood DE, UPI,
2013: Robert Quinn DE, PFWA
2017: Aaron Donald DT, AP
2018: Aaron Donald DT, AP, PFWA, SN
2020: Aaron Donald DT, AP, PFWA, SN

=== Offensive Player of the Year: (4) ===
1986: Eric Dickerson RB
1999: Marshall Faulk RB
2000: Marshall Faulk RB
2001: Marshall Faulk RB
2017: Todd Gurley RB
2021: Cooper Kupp WR

=== Man of the Year Award: (1) ===
2021: Andrew Whitworth LT

=== Pete Rozelle Trophy (Super Bowl MVP): (2) ===
2000: Kurt Warner QB (XXXIV)
2022: Cooper Kupp WR (LVI)

== Team award ==
- 1945 – Ed Thorp Memorial Trophy (NFL champion)
- 1951 – Ed Thorp Memorial Trophy (NFL Champion)
- 1979 – George Halas Trophy (NFC Champion)
- 1999 – George Halas Trophy (NFC Champion)
- 1999 – Vince Lombardi Trophy (Super Bowl XXXIV)
- 2001 – George Halas Trophy (NFC Champion)
- 2018 – George Halas Trophy (NFC Champion)
- 2021 – George Halas Trophy (NFC Champion)
- 2021 – Vince Lombardi Trophy (Super Bowl LVI)

== Individual team awards ==
=== Ed Block Courage Award ===
- 1984 Jack Youngblood
- 1985 Mike Guman
- 1986 Doug Smith
- 1987 Charles White
- 1988 Vince Newsome
- 1989 Mark Jerue
- 1990 Jerry Gray
- 1991 Michael Stewart
- 1992 Jackie Slater
- 1993 David Lang
- 1994 Roman Phifer
- 1995 Ron Wolfley
- 1996 Alexander Wright
- 1997 Mark Rypien
- 1998 Mike Jones
- 1999 Ernie Conwell
- 2000 Trent Green
- 2001 Isaac Bruce
- 2002 Andy McCollum
- 2003 Aeneas Williams
- 2004 Marshall Faulk
- 2005 Leonard Little
- 2006 Pisa Tinoisamoa
- 2007 Dane Looker
- 2008 Orlando Pace
- 2009 James Hall
- 2010 Bradley Fletcher
- 2011 Brit Miller
- 2012 Danny Amendola
- 2013 Lance Kendricks
- 2014 Scott Wells
- 2015 Brian Quick
- 2016 Alec Ogletree
- 2017 Darrell Williams
- 2018 Sam Shields
- 2019 Cooper Kupp
- 2020 Rob Havenstein
- 2021 Justin Lawler
- 2022 Jordan Fuller
- 2023 Joe Noteboom
- 2024 Tyler Higbee

=== Daniel F. Reeves Memorial Award ===
The Daniel F. Reeves Memorial Award is given to the Rams most valuable player of the year as determined by the players and coaches. It is named after Dan Reeves, the owner of the Rams from 1941 until 1971.

- 1969 Roman Gabriel
- 1970 Merlin Olsen
- 1971 Marlin McKeever
- 1972 Merlin Olsen
- 1973 John Hadl
- 1974 Lawrence McCutcheon
- 1975 Jack Youngblood
- 1976 Jack Youngblood
- 1977 Lawrence McCutcheon
- 1978 Jim Youngblood
- 1979 Jack Youngblood
- 1980 Vince Ferragamo
- 1981 Nolan Cromwell
- 1982 Vince Ferragamo
- 1983 Eric Dickerson
- 1984 Eric Dickerson
- 1985 LeRoy Irvin
- 1986 Eric Dickerson
- 1987 Charles White
- 1988 Henry Ellard
- 1989 Jim Everett
- 1990 Buford McGee
- 1991 Robert Delpino
- 1992 Jackie Slater
- 1993 Jerome Bettis
- 1994 Shane Conlan
- 1995 Isaac Bruce
- 1996 Isaac Bruce
- 1997 Amp Lee
- 1998 Kevin Carter
- 1999 Marshall Faulk
- 2000 Marshall Faulk
- 2001 Marshall Faulk
- 2002 Marc Bulger
- 2003 Torry Holt
- 2004 Marc Bulger
- 2005 Torry Holt
- 2006 Steven Jackson
- 2007 Will Witherspoon
- 2008 Oshiomogho Atogwe
- 2009 Steven Jackson
- 2010 Steven Jackson
- 2011 Steven Jackson
- 2012 Steven Jackson
- 2013 Robert Quinn
- 2014 Robert Quinn
- 2015 Aaron Donald
- 2016 Aaron Donald
- 2017 Todd Gurley
- 2018 Aaron Donald
- 2019 Aaron Donald
- 2020 Aaron Donald
- 2021 Cooper Kupp
- 2022 Bobby Wagner
- 2023 Matthew Stafford
- 2024 Matthew Stafford

=== Carroll Rosenbloom Memorial Award ===
The Carroll Rosenbloom Memorial Award is given to the Rams rookie of the year as determined by the players and coaches. The award is named after the former owner of the Rams. Rosenbloom was the owner of the Rams from 1972 until 1978.

- 1979 Kent Hill
- 1980 Johnnie Johnson
- 1981 Jairo Penaranda
- 1982 Barry Redden
- 1983 Eric Dickerson
- 1984 Ron Brown
- 1985 Dale Hatcher
- 1986 Jim Everett
- 1987 Cliff Hicks
- 1988 Robert Delpino
- 1989 Darryl Henley
- 1990 Bern Brostek
- 1991 Todd Lyght
- 1992 Sean Gilbert
- 1993 Jerome Bettis
- 1994 Isaac Bruce
- 1995 Kevin Carter
- 1996 Eddie Kennison
- 1997 David Thompson
- 1998 London Fletcher
- 1999 Torry Holt
- 2000 Matt Bowen
- 2001 Tommy Polley
- 2002 Travis Fisher
- 2003 Pisa Tinoisamoa
- 2004 Steven Jackson
- 2005 Alex Barron
- 2006 Tye Hill
- 2007 Adam Carriker
- 2008 Donnie Avery
- 2009 James Laurinaitis
- 2010 Sam Bradford
- 2011 Robert Quinn
- 2012 Janoris Jenkins
- 2013 Zac Stacy
- 2014 Aaron Donald
- 2015 Todd Gurley
- 2016 Cory Littleton
- 2017 Cooper Kupp
- 2018 John Franklin-Myers
- 2019 Taylor Rapp
- 2020 Jordan Fuller
- 2021 Ernest Jones
- 2022 Cobie Durant
- 2023 Puka Nacua
- 2024 Jared Verse

=== Carl Ekern Spirit Of The Game Award ===
The Carl Ekern Spirit of the Game Award is given to the player who best exemplifies sportsmanship, work ethic and commitment to his teammates. The award is named after the former Rams player, Carl Ekern, who played for the Rams from 1976 to 1988.

- 1991 Buford McGee, FB
- 1992 Darryl Henley, CB
- 1993 Tim Lester, FB
- 1994 Jackie Slater, T
- 1995 D'Marco Farr, DT
- 1996 Harold Green, RB
- 1997 Mike A. Jones, LB
- 1998 Mike A. Jones, LB
- 1999 Mike A. Jones, LB
- 2000 Ray Agnew, DT
- 2001 Aeneas Williams, CB
- 2002 Ernie Conwell, TE
- 2003 Aeneas Williams, S
- 2004 Pisa Tinoisamoa, LB
- 2005 Pisa Tinoisamoa, LB
- 2006 Corey Chavous, S
- 2007 Corey Chavous, S
- 2008 Corey Chavous, S
- 2009 Leonard Little DE
- 2010 Oshiomogho Atogwe S
- 2011 James Laurinaitis, MLB
- 2012 Steven Jackson, RB
- 2013 James Laurinaitis, LB
- 2014 Cory Harkey, FB
- 2015 Cory Harkey, FB
- 2016 Cory Harkey, FB
- 2017 Andrew Whitworth, OT
- 2018 Andrew Whitworth, OT
- 2019 Eric Weddle, S
- 2020 Andrew Whitworth, OT
- 2021
- 2022 Rob Havenstein, OT
- 2023 Cooper Kupp, WR
- 2024 Tyler Higbee, TE

== Ye Olde Rams Awards ==
Ye Olde Rams is now known as the Rams Alumni. From 1952 to the present, they vote on position awards for the Los Angeles Rams. The MVP and Rookie of the Year Awards were discontinued because the current players began voting on those two awards. Ye Olde Rams were run by former Rams George Struger and now operate under the Los Angeles Rams Alumni relations manager.

=== Most Valuable Player ===
The Ye Olde Rams Most Valuable player is given to the Rams most valuable player of the year as determined by the Los Angeles Rams Alumni. The award differs from the Reeves Awards, voted on by current Rams players.

- 1960 Les Richter
- 1961 Jim Phillips
- 1962 Dick Bass
- 1963 Roman Gabriel
- 1964 Eddie Meador
- 1965 Eddie Meador
- 1966 Dick Bass
- 1967 Roman Gabriel
- 1968 Deacon Jones
- 1969 Roman Gabriel
- 1970 Merlin Olsen
- 1971 Roman Gabriel
- 1972 Merlin Olsen
- 1973 John Hadl
- 1974 James Harris
- 1975 Jack Youngblood
- 1976 Jack Youngblood
- 1977 Pat Haden
- 1978 Jim Youngblood & Jack Reynolds
- 1979 Jack Youngblood
- 1980 Vince Ferragamo

=== Outstanding Rookie ===
1952—Bob Carey; 1953—Frank Fuller; 1954—Les Richter; 1955—Don Burroughs; 1956—Hugh Pitts; 1957—Jon Arnett; 1958—Lou Michaels; 1959—John LoVetere; 1960—Charley Britt; 1961—David Jones; 1962—Merlin Olsen; 1963—Don Chuy; 1964—Bill Munson; 1965—Jack Snow; 1966—Tom Mack; 1967—Willie Ellison; 1968—Mike Dennis; 1969—Larry Smith; 1970—Rich Saul; 1971—Isiah Robertson; 1972—Jim Bertelsen; 1973—Eddie McMillan; 1974—John Cappelletti; 1975—Monte Jackson; 1976—Pat Haden; 1977—Billy Waddy; 1978—Frank Corral; 1979—Kent Hill; 1980—Johnnie Johnson.

=== Outstanding Lineman ===
Award included both offensive and defensive "linemen" until separate awards; (O)—Offense; (D)—Defense; emerged in 1960. Offense ends i.e. Tom Fears, were considered linemen. Additionally, linebackers could be considered "non backs" and therefore linemen.
1951—Jim Winkler; 1952—Andy Robustelli; 1953—Andy Robustelli; 1954—Tom Fears; 1955—Bud McFadin; 1956—Bud McFadin; 1957—Duane Putnam; 1958—Del Shofner; 1959—Bob Fry; 1960—Jim Phillips (O), John LoVetere (D); 1961—Frank Varrichione (O), Lamar Lundy (D); 1962—Frank Varrichione (O), Deacon Jones (D); 1963—Frank Varrichione (O), Jack Pardee (D); 1964—Marlin McKeever (O), Deacon Jones (D); 1965—Tommy McDonald (O), Deacon Jones (D); 1966—Charlie Cowan (O), Deacon Jones (D); 1967—Joe Scibelli (O), Merlin Olsen (D); 1968—Joe Scibelli (O), Merlin Olsen (D); 1969—Ken Iman (O), Merlin Olsen (D) 1970—Tom Mack (O), Merlin Olsen (D); 1971—Joe Scibelli (O), Coy Bacon (D); 1972—Joe Scibelli (O), Coy Bacon (D); 1973—Joe Scibelli (O). Jack Youngblood (D); 1974—Charlie Cowan (O), Fred Dryer (D); 1975—Tom Mack (O), Jack Youngblood (D); 1976—Rich Saul (O), Jack Youngblood (D); 1977—Tom Mack (O), Larry Brooks (D); 1978—Tom Mack (O), Jack Youngblood (D); 1979—Rich Saul (O), Jack Youngblood (D); 1980—Rich Saul (O), Jack Youngblood (D); 1981—Rich Saul (O), Jack Youngblood (D); 1982—Kent Hill (O), Jack Youngblood (D); 1983—Jackie Slater (O), Jack Youngblood (D); 1984—Bill Bain (O), Jack Youngblood (D); 1985—Dennis Harrah (O), Gary Jeter (D); 1986—Jackie Slater (O), Gary Jeter (D); 1987—Jackie Slater (O), Gary Jeter (D); 1988—Tom Newberry (O), Gary Jeter (D).; 1989—Tom Newberry (O), Kevin Greene (D); 1990—Jackie Slater (O), Kevin Greene (D); 1991—Tom Newberry (O), Kevin Greene (D); 1992—Gerald Perry (O), Sean Gilbert (D); 1993—Bern Brostek (O), Sean Gilbert (D); 1994—Tom Newberry (O), Robert Young (D); 1995—Wayne Gandy (O), D'Marco Farr (D); 1996—Bern Brostek (O), Kevin Carter (D); 1997—Wayne Gandy (O), Bill Johnson (D); 1998—Wayne Gandy (O), Kevin Carter (D); 1999—Orlando Pace (O), Kevin Carter (D); 2000—Orlando Pace (O), Grant Wistrom (D); 2001—Orlando Pace (O), Grant Wistrom (D); 2002—Adam Timmerman (O), Leonard Little (D); 2002—Adam Timmerman (O), Leonard Little (D); 2003—Orlando Pace (O), Leonard Little (D); 2004— Orlando Pace (O), Leonard Little (D); 2005— Orlando Pace (O), Leonard Little (D); 2006—Adam Timmerman (O), Leonard Little (D); 2007—Alex Barron (O), La'Roi Glover (D); 2008—Richie Incognito (O), James Hall (D); 2009—Jason Brown (O), Chris Long (D); 2010—Rodger Saffold (O), Chris Long (D); 2011—Harvey Dahl (O), Chris Long (D); 2012—Harvey Dahl (O), Chris Long (D); 2013-Jake Long (O); Robert Quinn (D); 2014-Rodger Saffold (O); Robert Quinn (D); 2015-Rob Havenstein (O); Aaron Donald (D); 2016-Rodger Saffold (O);Aaron Donald (D) 2017-Rodger Saffold (O);Aaron Donald (D); 2018-Rob Havenstein (O); Aaron Donald (D); 2019-Andrew Whitworth (O); Aaron Donald (D); 2020-Rob Havenstein (O); Aaron Donald (D); 2021-Brian Allen (O); Aaron Donald (D)

=== Outstanding receiver ===
Created in 1967 to honor receivers only (ends and tight ends)
1967—Jack Snow; 1968—Bernie Casey; 1969—Billy Truax; 1970—Jack Snow; 1971 —Lance Rentzel; 1972—Jack Snow; 1973—Harold Jackson; 1974—Bob Klein; 1975—Ron Jessie; 1976—Ron Jessie; 1977—Terry Nelson; 1978—Ron Jessie; 1979—Preston Dennard; 1980—Preston Dennard, 1981—Preston Dennard; 1982—Preston Dennard; 1983—Mike Barber; 1984—Henry Ellard; 1985—Henry Ellard; 1986—Henry Ellard; 1987—Henry Ellard; 1988—Henry Ellard; 1989—Flipper Anderson; 1990—Henry Ellard; 1991—Henry Ellard; 1992—Flipper Anderson; 1993—Henry Ellard; 1994—Troy Drayton; 1995—Isaac Bruce; 1996—Isaac Bruce; 1997—Ernie Conwell; 1998—Ricky Proehl; 1999—Isaac Bruce; 2000—Isaac Bruce; 2001—Isaac Bruce & Torry Holt; 2002—Isaac Bruce; 2003—Torry Holt; 2004—Isaac Bruce & Torry Holt; 2005—Torry Holt; 2006—Torry Holt; 2007—Torry Holt; 2008—Torry Holt; 2009—Brandon Gibson; 2010—Brandon Gibson; 2011—Brandon Gibson; 2012—Danny Amendola; 2013- Tavon Austin; 2014- Kenny Britt; 2015-Tavon Austin; 2016- Kenny Britt; 2017- Sammy Watkins; 2018-Robert Woods; 2019-Cooper Kupp; 2020-Cooper Kupp; 2021-Cooper Kupp

=== Outstanding back ===
In 1960 separate awards emerged for both offensive and defensive backs. Linebackers were, at times, eligible for this award.
1951—Dan Towler; 1952—Paul Younger; 1953—Skeets Quinlan; 1954—Paul Younger; 1955—Ron Waller; 1956—Paul Younger; 1957—Tom Wilson; 1958—Jon Arnett; 1959—Jon Arnett; 1960—Jon Arnett (O), Eddie Meador (D); 1961—Dick Bass (O), Ed Meador (D); 1962—Dick Bass (O), Marlin McKeever (D); 1963—Dick Bass (O), Ed Meador (D); 1964-Les Josephson (O), Ed Meador (D); 1965—Dick Bass (O), Ed Meador (D); 1966—Dick Bass (O), Maxie Baughan (D); 1967—Les Josephson (O), Ed Meador (D); 1968—Roman Gabriel (O), Jack Pardee (D); 1969—Les Josephson (O), Ed Meador (D); 1970—Les Josephson (O), Jack Pardee (D); 1971—Willie Ellison (O), Marlin McKeever (D); 1972—Willie Ellison (O), Marlin McKeever (D); 1973—Lawrence McCutcheon (O), Dave Elmendorf (D); 1974—Lawrence McCutcheon (O), Dave Elmendorf (D); 1975—Lawrence McCutcheon (O), Bill Simpson (D); 1976—Lawrence McCutcheon (O), Monte Jackson (D); 1977—Lawrence McCutcheon (O), Bill Simpson (D); 1978—John Cappelletti (O), Pat Thomas (D); 1979—Wendell Tyler (O), Jim Youngblood (D); 1980—Vince Ferragamo (O), Nolan Cromwell (D); 1981—Wendell Tyler (O), Rod Perry (D); 1982—Wendell Tyler (O), Nolan Cromwell (D); 1983—Eric Dickerson (O), Johnnie Johnson (D); 1984—Eric Dickerson (O), Jim Collins (D); 1985—Eric Dickerson (O), LeRoy Irvin (D); 1986—Eric Dickerson (O), LeRoy Irvin (D); 1987—Charles White (O), Jerry Gray (D); 1988—Greg Bell (O), LeRoy Irvin (D); 1989—Greg Bell (O), Jerry Gray (D); 1990—Jim Everett (O), Vince Newsome (D); 1991—Robert Delpino (O), Michael Stewart (D); 1992—Cleveland Gary (O), Anthony Newman(D); 1993—Jerome Bettis (O), Roman Phifer (D); 1994—Jerome Bettis (O), Roman Phifer (D); 1995—Jerome Bettis (O), Toby Wright (D); 1996—Harold Green (O), Keith Lyle (D); 1997—Amp Lee (O), Roman Phifer (D); 1998—Tony Banks (O), Roman Phifer (D); 1999—Kurt Warner (O), Todd Lyght (D); 2000—Marshall Faulk (O), Dexter McCleon (D); 2001—Marshall Faulk (O), Aeneas Williams (D); 2002—Marshall Faulk (O), Dre' Bly (D); 2003—Marshall Faulk (O), Aeneas Williams (D); 2004—Marc Bulger (O), Jerametrius Butler (D); 2005—Steven Jackson (O), Adam Archuleta (D); 2006—Steven Jackson (O), Oshiomogho Atogwe (D); 2007—Steven Jackson (O), Will Witherspoon (D); 2008—Steven Jackson (O), Oshiomogho Atogwe (D); 2009—Steven Jackson (O), Oshiomogho Atogwe (D);2010—Sam Bradford (O), Oshiomogho Atogwe (D); 2011—Steven Jackson (O), James Laurinaitis (D); (D); 2012—Sam Bradford (O), Cortland Finnegan (D); 2013- Zac Stacy (O); Janoris Jenkins (D); 2014- Tre Mason (O); Alec Ogletree (D); 2015- Todd Gurley (O); Trumaine Johnson; 2016- Todd Gurley (O); Alec Ogletree (D); 2017- Todd Gurley (O); Lamarcus Joyner (D); 2018- Todd Gurley (O); John Johnson III (D); 2019- Todd Gurley (O); Jalen Ramsey (D); 2020- Cam Akers (O); Jalen Ramsey (D); 2021- Matthew Stafford (O); Jalen Ramsey (D)

=== Outstanding Special Teams player ===
1969—Alvin Haymond 1970—Avlin Haymond; 1971—Alvin Haymond; 1972—Dave Chapple; 1973—David Ray; 1974—Jim Youngblood; 1975—Tom Dempsey; 1976—Cullen Bryant; 1977—Jim Jodat; 1978—Frank Corral; 1979—Ivory Sully; 1980—Ivory Sully; 1981—LeRoy Irvin; 1982—Ivory Sully; 1983—Ivory Sully; 1984—Norwood Vann and Ivory Sully; 1985—Dale Hatcher & Ron Brown; 1986—Vince Newsome; 1987—Ron Brown; 1988—Robert Delpino; 1989— Mike Lansford; 1990—Pat Terrell; 1991—Paul Butcher; 1992—Todd Kinchen; 1993—Thomas Homco; 1994—Todd Kinchen; 1995—Cedric Figaro; 1996—Todd Kinchen; 1997—Jeff Robinson; 1998—London Fletcher; 1999—Tony Horne; 2000—Az-Zahir Hakim; 2001—Jeff Wilkins; 2002— Nick Sorensen; 2003—Jeff Wilkins; 2004—Trev Faulk; 2005—Madison Hedgecock; 2006—Jeff Wilkins; 2007—Dante Hall; 2008—Donnie Jones; 2009—Donnie Jones & Chris Chamberlain; 2010—Danny Amendola; 2011—Dominique Curry; 2012—Greg Zuerlein; 2013-Johnny Hekker; 2014-Johnny Hekker; 2015-Johnny Hekker; 2016-Johnny Hekker; 2017—Greg Zuerlein; 2018-Cory Littleton; 2019-Johnny Hekker; 2020-Johnny Hekker; 2021-Matt Gay

=== NEA Third Down Trophy ===
The Rams MVP as determined by the Newspaper Enterprise Association, which gave the award beginning with the American Football League in 1960 and with the National Football League in 1970 and continued through 1979. 1970—Merlin Olsen; 1971—Willie Ellison; 1972—Ken Iman; 1973—John Hadl; 1974—Lawrence McCutcheon; 1975—Harold Jackson; 1976—Lawrence McCutcheon; 1977—Pat Haden; 1978—Jack Reynolds; 1979—Jim Youngblood

== Other achievements ==
=== Pro Football Hall of Famers ===
Former Rams in the Pro Football Hall of Fame include Joe Namath (12), Ollie Matson (33), Andy Robustelli (84), Dick "Night Train" Lane (81), coach Earl "Dutch" Clark, and general manager Tex Schramm. GM and later NFL Commissioner Pete Rozelle and coach Sid Gillman are also members of the Hall of Fame, but were elected on the basis of their performances with other teams or (in the case of Rozelle) NFL administration.

Cleveland/Los Angeles/St. Louis Rams Hall of Famers
No.	Player	Class	Position(s)	Tenure
--	George Allen	2002	Coach	1966–1970
36	Jerome Bettis	2015	RB	1993–1995
80	Isaac Bruce	2020	WR	1994-2007
29	Eric Dickerson	1999	RB	1983–1987
28	Marshall Faulk	2011	RB	1999-2006
55	Tom Fears	1970	End	1948–1956
91	Kevin Greene	2016	LB	1985-1992
40	Elroy "Crazy Legs" Hirsch	1968	RB, WR	1949–1957
75	Deacon Jones	1980	DE	1961–1971
65	Tom Mack	1999	G	1966–1978
74	Merlin Olsen	1982	DT	1962–1976
76	Orlando Pace	2016	OT	1997-2008
--	Dan Reeves	1967	Owner	1941–1971
78	Jackie Slater	2001	OT	1976–1995
25	Norm Van Brocklin	1971	QB, P	1949–1957
10, 13	Kurt Warner	2017	QB	1998-2003
7	Bob Waterfield	1965	QB, DB, K, P	1945–1952
35	Aeneas Williams	2014	CB	2001–2004
85	Jack Youngblood	2001	DE	1971–1984

=== St. Louis Football Ring of Fame ===
Former Rams were included in the former Ring Of Fame in the Dome at America's Center. All players included were Hall of Famers, but there have been a few exceptions for team executives and coaches.

Players
No.	Player	Tenure	Inducted
7	Bob Waterfield	1945–1952	1999
25	Norm Van Brocklin	1949–1957	1999
28	Marshall Faulk	1999–2006	2011
29	Eric Dickerson	1983–1987	1999
40	Elroy "Crazy Legs" Hirsch	1949–1957	1999
48	Les Richter	1954–1962	2011
55	Tom Fears	1948–1956	1999
65	Tom Mack	1966–1978	1999
74	Merlin Olsen	1962–1976	1999
75	Deacon Jones	1961–1971	1999
78	Jackie Slater	1976–1995	2001
84*	Jack Snow	1965–1975, Broadcaster	2006
85	Jack Youngblood	1971–1984	2001
*Jack Snow is not a Hall of Famer, but is honored due to his death in 2006
Coaches and executives
	Name	Tenure	Inducted
Head coach	Dick Vermeil	1997–1999	2008
Owner	Dan Reeves	1941–1971	2008
Owner	Carroll Rosenbloom	1972–1979	2008
Owner	Georgia Frontiere	1979–2007	2008

=== Retired numbers ===
Numbers that have been retired by the Rams.

- 7 Bob Waterfield
- 28 Marshall Faulk
- 29 Eric Dickerson
- 74 Merlin Olsen
- 75 Deacon Jones
- 78 Jackie Slater
- 80 Isaac Bruce
- 85 Jack Youngblood

=== Los Angeles Rams 40th Anniversary Team ===
Chosen by a fan vote of the Los Angeles Times in 1985.

=== St. Louis Rams 10th Anniversary Team ===
Chosen by a fan vote in 2005.

=== Rams 75th Anniversary Team ===
Chosen by stadium fan vote, 2012.

=== CSVA Sports Film and Video Hall of Famers ===
- Mickey Dukitch (2011)

== Statistical awards ==
=== Sacks ===
Note: Year-by-year sack totals. Sacks became an officially recognized statistic in 1982.

1960— Brito • 7
1961— Lundy • 11
1962— Jones • 12
1963— Lundy • 9
1964— Jones • 22
1965— Jones • 19
1966— Jones • 18
1967— Jones • 21
1968— Jones • 22
1969— Jones • 15
1970— Jones • 12
1971— C. Bacon • 11
1972— C. Bacon • 11½
1973— Youngblood • 16½
1974— Youngblood • 15
1975— Youngblood • 15
1976— (tie) Youngblood & Brooks • 14½
1977— Youngblood • 8½
1978— Brooks • 8
1979— Youngblood • 18

1980— Youngblood • 11½
1981— Youngblood • 12½
1982— Fanning • 5
1983— Youngblood • 10½
1984— Youngblood • 9½
1985— Wilcher • 12½
1986— Jeter • 8
1987— Jeter • 7
1988— Greene • 16½
1989— Greene • 16½
1990 — Greene • 13
1991— (tie) Greene & Robinson • 3
1992— Greene • 10
1993— Gilbert • 10½
1994— Young • 6.5½
1995— Farr • 11
1996— Carter • 9½
1997— O’Neal • 10
1998— Carter • 12
1999— Carter • 17

2000— Wistrom • 11
2001— Little • 14½
2002— Little • 12
2003— Little • 12½
2004— Fisher • 8½
2005— Little • 9½
2006— Little • 13
2007— Witherspoon • 7
2008— J. Hall • 6½
2009— Little • 6½
2010— J. Hall • 10½
2011— Long • 13
2012— Long • 11½
2013— Quinn • 19
2014— Quinn • 10½
2015— Donald • 11
2016— Donald • 8
2017— Donald • 11
2018— Donald • 20½
