= List of Los Angeles Rams players =

The following lists provide an overview of notable groupings of Los Angeles Rams players.

== Notable alumni ==
No.	Player	Position(s)	Years played
26	Jim Hardy	QB	1946–1948
13	Kenny Washington	RB	1946–1948
83	Flipper Anderson	WR	1988–1994
36	Jerome Bettis	RB	1993–1995
5	Dieter Brock	QB	1985
90	Larry Brooks	DT	1972–1982
76	Bob Brown	OT	1969–1970
32	Cullen Bryant	DB, RB	1973–1982, 1987
22	John Cappelletti	RB	1974–1978
73	Charlie Cowan	OT	1961–1975
21	Nolan Cromwell	S	1977–1987
88	Preston Dennard	WR	1978–1983
29	Eric Dickerson	RB	1983–1987
89	Fred Dryer	DE	1972–1981
80	Henry Ellard	WR	1983–1993
42	Dave Elmendorf	S	1971–1979
11	Jim Everett	QB	1986–1993
28	Marshall Faulk	RB	1999–2005
55	Tom Fears	End	1948–1956
15	Vince Ferragamo	QB	1977–1980, 1982–1984
77	Doug France	OT	1975–1981
18	Roman Gabriel	QB	1962–1972
25	Jerry Gray	CB	1985–1971
91	Kevin Greene	LB	1985–1992
11	Pat Haden	QB	1976–1981
60	Dennis Harrah	G	1975–1987
72	Kent Hill	G	1979–1986
50	Ken Iman	C	1965–1974
40	Elroy "Crazy Legs" Hirsch	RB, WR	1949–1957
47	Leroy Irvin	CB	1980–1989
75	Deacon Jones	DE	1961–1971
52	Mike Jones	LB	1997–2000
41	Todd Lyght	CB	1991–2000
65	Tom Mack	G	1966–1978
21	Eddie Meador	CB	1959–1970
30	Lawrence McCutcheon	RB	1972–1979
74	Merlin Olsen	DT	1962–1976
49	Rod Perry	CB	1975–1982
54/64	Jack Reynolds	LB	1970–1980
67/48	Les Richter	LB	1954–1962
61	Rich Saul	C	1970–1981
71	Joe Scibelli	OG	1961–1975
78	Jackie Slater	OT	1976–1995
84	Jack Snow	WR	1965–1975
27	Pat Thomas	CB	1976–1982
25/11	Norm Van Brocklin	QB, P	1949–1957
7	Bob Waterfield	QB, DB, K, P	1945–1952
33	Charles White	RB	1985–1988
76	Orlando Pace	LT	1997–2009
98	Grant Wistrom	DE	1998–2003
13	Kurt Warner	QB	1998–2003
35	Aeneas Williams	DB	2001–2004
85	Jack Youngblood	DE	1971–1984
53	Jim Youngblood	LB	1973–1984
29	Harold Jackson	WR	1973–1977
12	Joe Namath	QB	1977
77	Verda T. 'Vitamin T' Smith	RB	1949–53

== Current players ==
Los Angeles Rams roster
Quarterbacks (QB): 13 Stetson Bennett; 2 Matthew Caldwell; 15 Ty Simpson; 9 Matthew Stafford; Running backs (RB): 33 Dean Connors; 24 Blake Corum; 27 Jarquez Hunter; 20 Ronnie Rivers; 32 Jordan Waters; 23 Kyren Williams; Wide receivers (WR): 17 Davante Adams; 5 Alex Bachman; 6 CJ Daniels; 16 Tru Edwards; 4 Konata Mumpfield; 12 Puka Nacua; 81 Brennan Presley; 82 Tyler Scott; 19 Xavier Smith; 88 Jordan Whittington; Tight ends (TE): 87 Davis Allen; 18 Terrance Ferguson; 89 Tyler Higbee; 46 Rohan Jones; 86 Max Klare; 84 Colby Parkinson; 83 Mark Redman; 38 Dan Villari	Offensive linemen (OL): 61 A. J. Arcuri LT; 73 Steve Avila LG; 64 Austin Blaske C; 60 Wyatt Bowles G; 69 Kevin Dotson RG; 72 Blake Hance G; 70 Bryce Henderson RT; 77 Alaric Jackson LT; 50 Beaux Limmer C; 71 Warren McClendon RT; 63 Dylan McMahon C; 66 Bill Murray G; 68 David Quessenberry LT; 65 Coleman Shelton C; 79 Keagen Trost RT; Defensive linemen (DL): 90 Tyler Davis DE; 55 Braden Fiske DE; 97 Poona Ford NT; 95 Myles Garrett DE; 57 Ty Hamilton NT; 94 Desjuan Johnson DE; 96 Tim Keenan III NT; 98 Jaxson Moi DE; 52 Larrell Murchison DE; 93 Bill Norton DE; 40 Daniel Rickert DE; 91 Kobie Turner DE; 62 Payton Zdroik DE	Linebackers (LB): 47 Wesley Bailey OLB; 56 Shaun Dolac ILB; 51 Tomon Fox OLB; 54 Nikhai Hill-Green ILB; 53 Nate Landman ILB; 58 Elias Neal ILB; 59 Darryl Peterson III OLB; 8 Monty Rice ILB; 48 Omar Speights ILB; 10 Josaiah Stewart OLB; 44 Grant Stuard ILB; 11 Keir Thomas OLB; 0 Byron Young OLB; Defensive backs (DB): 45 Nick Andersen S; 39 Alex Cook S; 3 Kamren Curl SS; 1 Emmanuel Forbes CB; 25 Nyzier Fourqurean CB; 31 Al'Zillion Hamilton CB; 34 Tanner Ingle SS; 36 Alex Johnson CB; 5 Kamren Kinchens FS; 37 Quentin Lake FS; 21 Cam Lampkin CB; 2 Jaylen McCollough SS; 22 Trent McDuffie CB; 41 Zech McPhearson CB; 43 Nate Valcarcel S; 30 Josh Wallace CB; 35 Jaylen Watson CB; Special teams (ST): 14 Jack Bouwmeester P (IPP); 49 Joe Cardona LS; 42 Ethan Evans P; 92 Harrison Mevis K	Reserve: 67 Justin Dedich LG (Active/NF-Inj.); 51 Eddie Walls III OLB (IR); 14 Mario Williams WR (IR) 90 active (1 exempt), 2 reserve As of August 18, 2026. Rookies in italics.; Roster; Depth chart; Transactions

== Super Bowl XXXIV Championship Roster ==
The 1999 St. Louis Rams NFL Championship Team
Offensive backs: 9 Joe Germaine QB; 13 Kurt Warner QB; 16 Paul Justin QB; 25 Robert Holcombe FB; 28 Marshall Faulk RB; 31 Amp Lee RB; 36 Justin Watson RB; 42 James Hodgins FB; Receivers: 45 Jeff Robinson TE; 80 Isaac Bruce WR; 81 Az-Zahir Hakim WR/PR; 82 Tony Horne WR/KOR; 83 Chris Thomas WR; 84 Ernie Conwell TE; 86 Roland Williams TE; 87 Ricky Proehl WR; 88 Torry Holt WR; Kickers: 2 Mike Horan P; 11 Rick Tuten P; 14 Jeff Wilkins K	Offensive line: 50 Ryan Tucker C; 60 Mike Gruttadauria C; 61 Tom Nütten LG; 62 Adam Timmerman RG; 64 Andy McCollum C; 71 Cameron Spikes G; 73 Fred Miller RT; 76 Orlando Pace LT; 77 Matt Willig OT; Linebackers: 51 Lorenzo Styles MLB; 52 Mike Jones LLB; 54 Todd Collins RLB; 56 Charlie Clemons MLB; 57 Leonard Little LB; 58 Mike Morton OLB; 59 London Fletcher MLB; 91 Troy Pelshak RLB	Defensive backs: 20 Taje Allen DB; 21 Dexter McCleon RC; 22 Billy Jenkins SS; 23 Devin Bush SS; 24 Ron Carpenter S/KOR; 27 Dwaine Carpenter FS; 32 Dré Bly DB; 35 Keith Lyle FS; 38 Rich Coady FS; 41 Todd Lyght LC; Defensive line: 90 Jeff Zgonina DT; 92 Lionel Barnes DE; 93 Kevin Carter DE; 95 Nate Hobgood-Chittick DT; 96 Jay Williams DT; 98 Grant Wistrom DE; 99 Ray Agnew DT; 75 D'Marco Farr DT
