= List of Los Angeles Rams first-round draft picks =

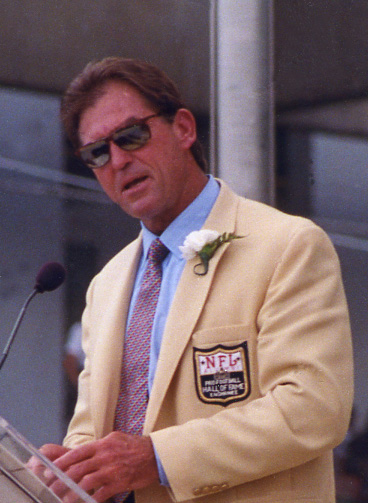
Jack Youngblood, drafted in 1971, played 201 consecutive games for the Rams.

The Los Angeles Rams, a professional American football team based in Los Angeles, joined the National Football League (NFL) as the Cleveland Rams in 1937. The Rams began playing in 1936 as a charter member of the second American Football League. Although the NFL granted membership to the same owner, the NFL considers it a separate entity. In 1946, Rams' owner Dan Reeves, fed up with poor attendance at Cleveland Stadium, moved the Rams to Los Angeles, and the team played there from 1946 to 1979. Before his death in 1979, later Rams owner Carroll Rosenbloom planned a move within the Los Angeles metropolitan area to Anaheim, using the venue now known as Angel Stadium, and his widow and successor Georgia Frontiere went through with the move in 1980, with the team still officially representing Los Angeles. The Rams moved to St. Louis in 1995 and renamed the team St. Louis Rams. In January 2016, the Rams and the NFL announced that the team would return to Los Angeles. The team initially played at its original L.A. venue, the Los Angeles Memorial Coliseum from 2016 to 2019, while awaiting the 2020 opening of its new stadium in suburban Inglewood.

The Rams first participated in the 1938 NFL Annual Player Selection Meeting, more commonly known as the NFL draft. The Rams did have a 1937 pick, but it was picked by the NFL for an expansion team and later the Rams were later admitted into the league before the 1937 season. Every year during April, each NFL franchise seeks to add new players to its roster through the NFL Draft. Teams are ranked in inverse order based on the previous season's record, with the worst record picking first, and the second–worst picking second and so on. The two exceptions to this order are made for teams that appeared in the previous Super Bowl; the Super Bowl champion always picks 32nd, and the Super Bowl loser always picks 31st. Teams have the option of trading away their picks to other teams for different picks, players, cash, or a combination thereof. Thus, it is not uncommon for a team's actual draft pick to differ from their assigned draft pick, or for a team to have extra or no draft picks in any round due to these trades.

The Rams' first selection as an NFL team was Johnny Drake, a fullback from Purdue in 1937. The Rams have selected the number one overall six times, drafting Corbett Davis in 1938, Billy Cannon in 1960, Terry Baker in 1963, Orlando Pace in 1997, Sam Bradford in 2010, and Jared Goff in 2016. The Rams have drafted second overall seven times and the third overall two times. Five eventual Hall of Famers were selected by the Rams: Elroy "Crazylegs" Hirsch, Merlin Olsen, Tom Mack, Jack Youngblood, and Eric Dickerson. The team's most recent first round selection was Ty Simpson, a quarterback from Alabama.

== Key ==
RB	Running back	FB	Fullback
HB	Halfback	QB	Quarterback
DE	Defensive end	C	Center
LB	Linebacker	T	Offensive tackle
TE	Tight end	DB	Defensive back
WR	Wide receiver	DT	Defensive tackle
S	Safety	CB	Cornerback
†	Inducted into the Pro Football Hall of Fame		
*	Selected number one overall		

== Player selection ==
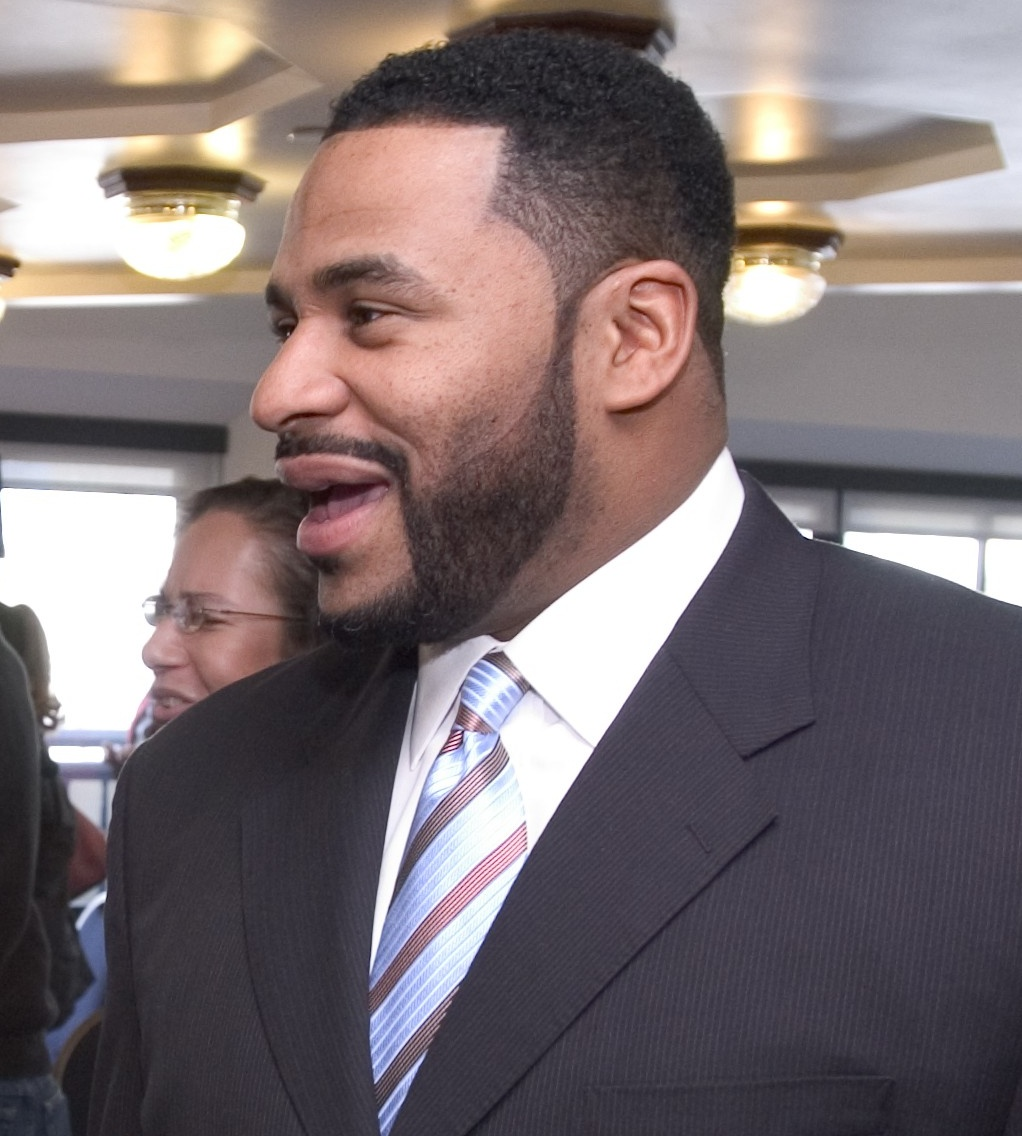
Rams' 1993 1st round draft pick Jerome Bettis

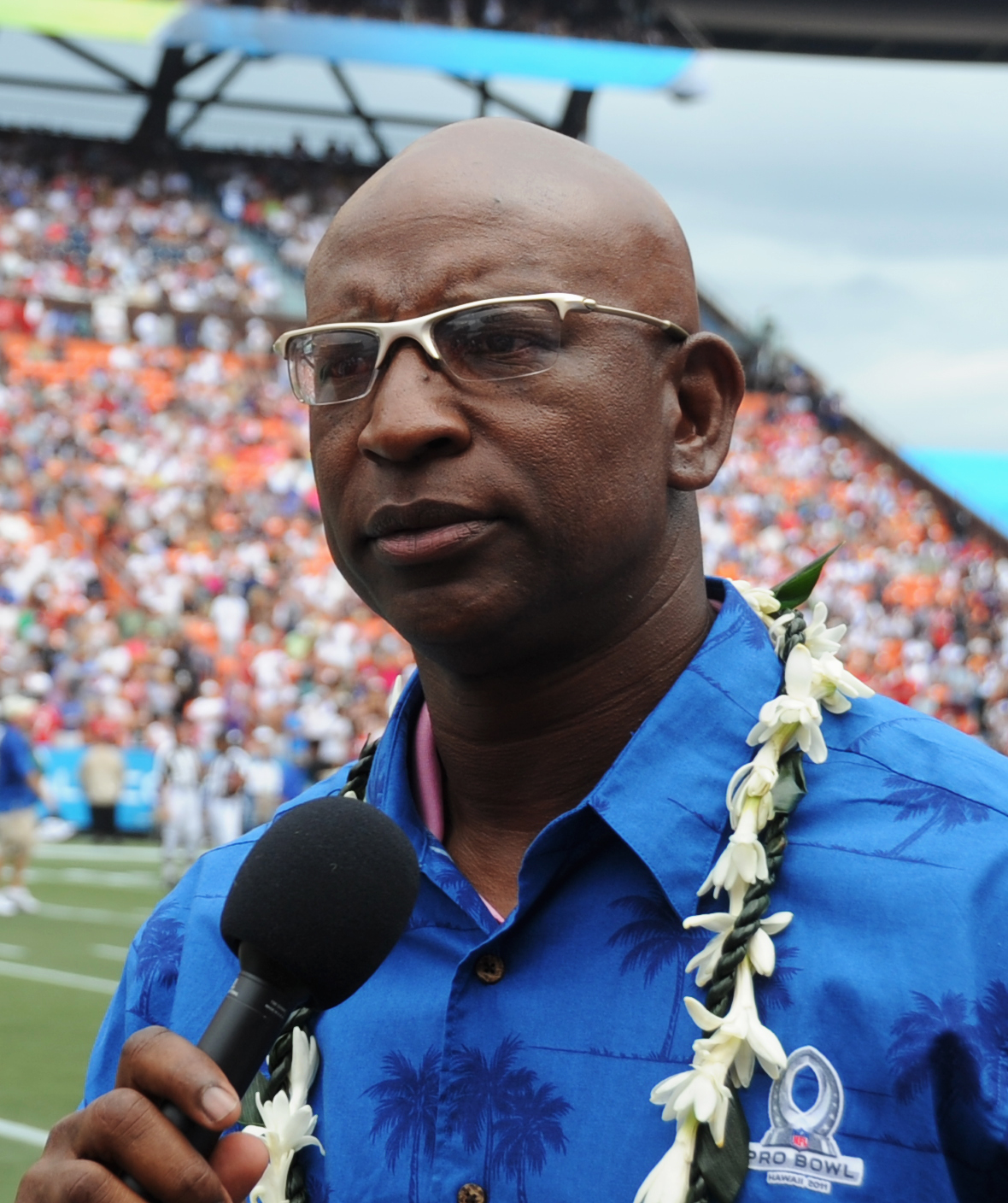
Rams' 1983 1st round draft pick Eric Dickerson

Year	Pick	Player	Position	College	Notes
1937	10	Johnny Drake	FB	Purdue	
1938	1	Corbett Davis *	FB	Indiana	
1939	3	Parker Hall	QB	Mississippi	
1940	5	Olie Cordill	HB	Rice	
1941	4	Rudy Mucha	G	Washington	
1942	2	Jack Wilson	HB	Baylor	
1943	5	Mike Holovak	FB	Boston College	
1944	11	Tony Butkovich	B	Illinois	
1945	5	Crazy Legs Hirsch†	OE	Michigan	
1946	10	Emil Sitko	HB	Notre Dame	
1947	9	Herman Wedemeyer	B	Saint Mary's (California)	
1948	No pick				^{[a]}
1949	7	Bobby Thomason	QB	VMI	
1950	9	Ralph Pasquariello	FB	Villanova	^{[b]}
1950	12	Stan West	G	Oklahoma	
1951	11	Bud McFadin	DT	Texas	
1952	1	Bill Wade	QB	Vanderbilt	
1952	13	Bob Carey	DE	Michigan State	
1953	9	Donn Moomaw	C	UCLA	^{[c]}
1953	12	Ed Barker	DE	Washington State	
1954	10	Ed Beatty	C	Mississippi	
1955	7	Larry Morris	C	Georgia Tech	
1956	6	Joe Marconi	HB	West Virginia	^{[d]}
1956	11	Charlie Horton	HB	Vanderbilt	
1957	2	Jon Arnett	HB	USC	
1957	11	Del Shofner	HB	Baylor	^{[e]}
1958	4	Lou Michaels	DT	Kentucky	^{[f]}
1958	5	Jim Phillips	DE	Auburn	
1959	2	Dick Bass	HB	Pacific	^{[g]}
1959	9	Paul Dickson	DT	Baylor	
1960	1	Billy Cannon *	RB	LSU	
1961	4	Marlin McKeever	LB	USC	
1962	2	Roman Gabriel	QB	North Carolina State	^{[h]}
1962	3	Merlin Olsen†	DT	Utah State	
1963	1	Terry Baker *	RB	Oregon State	
1963	10	Rufus Guthrie	G	Georgia Tech	^{[i]}
1964	7	Bill Munson	QB	Utah State	
1965	9	Clancy Williams	HB	Washington State	
1966	2	Tom Mack†	OT	Michigan	
1967	No pick				^{[j]}
1968	No pick				^{[k]}
1969	8	Larry Smith	RB	Florida	^{[l]}
1969	10	Jim Seymour	SE	Notre Dame	^{[m]}
1969	21	Bob Klein	TE	USC	
1970	22	Jack Reynolds	LB	Tennessee	
1971	10	Isiah Robertson	LB	Southern	^{[n]}
1971	20	Jack Youngblood†	DE	Florida	
1972	No pick				^{[o]}
1973	No pick				^{[p]}
1974	11	John Cappelletti	RB	Penn State	^{[q]}
1975	9	Mike Fanning	DT	Notre Dame	^{[r]}
1975	11	Dennis Harrah	G	Miami (Florida)	^{[q]}
1975	20	Doug France	T	Ohio State	
1976	26	Kevin McLain	LB	Colorado State	
1977	23	Bob Brudzinski	LB	Ohio State	
1978	20	Elvis Peacock	RB	Oklahoma	
1979	19	George Andrews	LB	Nebraska	
1979	26	Kent Hill	T	Georgia Tech	
1980	17	Johnnie Johnson	S	Texas	
1981	9	Mel Owens	LB	Michigan	
1982	14	Barry Redden	RB	Richmond	
1983	2	Eric Dickerson†	RB	Southern Methodist	
1984	—	No pick	—	—	^{[s]}
1985	21	Jerry Gray	S	Texas	
1986	23	Mike Schad	T	Queen's (Canada)	
1987	No pick				^{[t]}
1988	14	Gaston Green	RB	UCLA	^{[u]}
1988	20	Aaron Cox	WR	Arizona State	^{[u]}
1989	21	Bill Hawkins	DE	Miami (Florida)	
1989	26	Cleveland Gary	RB	Miami {Florida}	^{[u]}
1990	23	Bern Brostek	D	Washington	
1991	5	Todd Lyght	CB	Notre Dame	
1992	3	Sean Gilbert	DL	Pittsburgh	
1993	10	Jerome Bettis	RB	Notre Dame	
1994	15	Wayne Gandy	T	Auburn	
1995	6	Kevin Carter	DE	Florida	
1996	6	Lawrence Phillips	RB	Nebraska	^{[v]}
1996	18	Eddie Kennison	WR	Louisiana State	
1997	1	Orlando Pace*	T	Ohio State	
1998	6	Grant Wistrom	DE	Nebraska	
1999	6	Torry Holt	WR	North Carolina State	
2000	31	Trung Canidate	RB	Arizona	
2001	12	Damione Lewis	DT	Miami (Florida)	^{[w]}
2001	20	Adam Archuleta	DB	Arizona State	
2001	29	Ryan Pickett	DT	Ohio State	^{[x]}
2002	31	Robert Thomas	LB	UCLA	
2003	12	Jimmy Kennedy	DT	Penn State	
2004	24	Steven Jackson	RB	Oregon State	
2005	19	Alex Barron	OT	Florida State	
2006	15	Tye Hill	CB	Clemson	
2007	13	Adam Carriker	DE	Nebraska	
2008	2	Chris Long	DE	Virginia	
2009	2	Jason Smith	OT	Baylor	
2010	1	Sam Bradford*	QB	Oklahoma	
2011	14	Robert Quinn	DE	North Carolina	
2012	14	Michael Brockers	DT	LSU	
2013	8	Tavon Austin	WR	West Virginia	
2013	30	Alec Ogletree	LB	Georgia	
2014	2	Greg Robinson	OT	Auburn	^{[y]}
2014	13	Aaron Donald	DT	Pittsburgh	
2015	10	Todd Gurley	RB	Georgia	
2016	1	Jared Goff*	QB	California	^{[z]}
2017	No pick (traded to Tennessee to select Jared Goff)				^{[z]}
2018	No pick (traded to New England for Brandin Cooks)				
2019	No pick (traded to Atlanta for more picks)				
2020	No pick (traded to Jacksonville for Jalen Ramsey)				
2021	No pick (traded to Jacksonville for Jalen Ramsey)				
2022	No pick (traded to Detroit for Matthew Stafford)				
2023	No pick (traded to Detroit for Matthew Stafford)				
2024	19	Jared Verse	DE	Florida State	
2025	No pick (traded to Atlanta for more picks)				^{[aa]}
2026	13	Ty Simpson	QB	Alabama	^{[aa]}

== Notes ==
- ^{a} The Rams traded their 1948 pick to Detroit Lions.
- ^{b} The Rams received the 1950 pick (9th overall) from Chicago Cardinals.
- ^{c} The Rams received the 1953 pick (9th overall) from Philadelphia Eagles.
- ^{d} The Rams received the 1956 pick (6th overall) from New York Giants.
- ^{e} The Rams received the 1957 pick (11th overall) from New York Giants.
- ^{f} The Rams received the 1958 pick (4th overall) from Washington Redskins.
- ^{g} The Rams received the 1959 pick (2nd overall) from Philadelphia Eagles.
- ^{h} The Rams received the 1962 pick (2nd overall) from Minnesota Vikings.
- ^{i} The Rams received the 1963 pick (10th overall) from Chicago Bears.
- ^{j} The Rams traded their 1967 pick to Minnesota Vikings.
- ^{k} The Rams traded their 1968 pick to Detroit Lions.
- ^{l} The Rams received the 1969 pick (8th overall) from Detroit Lions.
- ^{m} The Rams received the 1969 pick (10th overall) from Washington Redskins.
- ^{n} The Rams received the 1971 pick (10th overall) Washington Redskins.
- ^{o} The Rams traded their 1972 pick to New England Patriots.
- ^{p} The Rams traded Rick Cash and the 1973 first-round pick (11th overall) to New England Patriots for Fred Dryer.
- ^{q} The Rams traded Roman Gabriel to Philadelphia Eagles for Eagles' 1974 first-round pick and 1975 first and third-round picks. The Rams traded their own 1974 pick to Baltimore Colts.
- ^{r} The Rams received the 1975 pick (9th overall) from Green Bay Packers.
- ^{s} The Rams traded their 1984 pick to Kansas City Chiefs.
- ^{t} The Rams traded their 1987 pick (20th overall) to the Houston Oilers.
- ^{u} The Rams traded the 1988 first-round pick (14th overall) to Detroit Lions, and received the 1988 pick (3rd overall) from Indianapolis Colts.
- ^{v} The Rams received the 1996 pick (6th overall) to Washington Redskins.
- ^{w} The Rams traded Trent Green, and 2001 fourth-round pick (150th overall) to Kansas City Chiefs for the Chiefs' 2001 first-round pick (12th overall) on April 20, 2001.
- ^{x} The Rams traded Kevin Carter to Tennessee Titans for the Titans' 2001 first-round pick (29th overall) on March 29, 2001.
- ^{y} The Rams traded their first-round (2nd overall) selection in the 2012 NFL Draft for the Redskin's first round (6th overall) and second round (39th overall) in the 2012 NFL Draft, the Redskin's first-round selection (22nd overall) in the 2013 NFL Draft, and the first-round selection (2nd overall) in the 2014 NFL Draft.
- ^{z} The Rams traded their first-round (15th overall), two second-round (43rd and 45th overall), and third-round (76th overall) selections in the 2016 NFL Draft as well as their first- and third-round selections in the 2017 NFL Draft for the Titans' first-round (1st overall), fourth-round (113th overall), and sixth-round (177th overall) selections in the 2016 NFL Draft
- ^{aa} The Rams traded their 2025 first- and third-round selections to Atlanta in exchange for their 2026 first-round selection (13th overall), and 2025 second- and seventh-round selections.
