= Johnnie Johnson (American football) =

American football player (born 1956)

No. 20, 27
- Positions: Cornerback, safety

Personal information
- Born: October 8, 1956 (age 70); La Grange, Texas, U.S.
- Listed height: 6 ft 1 in (1.85 m)
- Listed weight: 185 lb (84 kg)

Career information
- High school: La Grange
- College: Texas
- NFL draft: 1980: 1st round, 17th overall pick

Career history
- Los Angeles Rams (1980–1988); Seattle Seahawks (1989); Los Angeles Rams (1990)*
- * Offseason or practice squad member only

Awards and highlights
- First-team All-Pro (1983); PFWA All-Rookie Team (1980); 2× Unanimous All-American (1978, 1979); SWC Defensive Player of the Year (1978); 2× First-team All-SWC (1977, 1978)

Career NFL statistics
- Interceptions: 22
- Fumble recoveries: 22
- Touchdowns: 5
- Stats at Pro Football Reference
- College Football Hall of Fame

Johnnie Johnson (born October 8, 1956) is an American former professional football player who was a cornerback and safety in the National Football League (NFL) for 10 seasons during the 1980s. Johnson played college football for the University of Texas, and was a two-time unanimous All-American. A first-round choice in the 1980 NFL draft, he played professionally for the Los Angeles Rams and Seattle Seahawks. Johnson was elected to the College Football Hall of Fame in May 2007. Johnson's son, Collin Johnson, played as a wide receiver in the NFL for five seasons.

== College career ==
In his final three seasons he was a member of a team that placed among the nation's top-ten in total defense. Johnson also excelled on special teams as a punt return specialist. Many of his punt return marks still stand in the UT record books. In his freshman year, Johnson got off to a great start being named a starter in his first game, but a leg injury kept him on the sidelines for much of the year. The next year, he regained his starting status on a team that went through the regular season undefeated. That year his fourth-down tackle inside the Texas five-yard line preserved a win over Oklahoma. He won the first of three All-Southwest Conference honors that year. In an era before the advent of the Thorpe Award, Johnson was named the nation's top defensive back of 1978 by the New York Downtown Athletic Club.

== Professional career ==
Johnson was selected by the Rams in the first round of the 1980 NFL draft with the 17th overall pick. The Rams signed him to a six-year, $1 million contract., which caused veteran free-agent Rams Jack Youngblood, Jim Youngblood, Dennis Harrah, and Larry Brooks to hold out during the 1980 pre-season.

Johnson holds the Rams record for the longest interception return after scoring on a 99-yard return against the Green Bay Packers in 1980. Off the field, he appeared in the 1986 Rams promotional video, Let's Ram It.

== See also ==
- List of Texas Longhorns football All-Americans
- List of Los Angeles Rams first-round draft picks
