= Bern Brostek =

American football player (born 1966)

No. 61
- Positions: Center, guard

Personal information
- Born: September 11, 1966 (age 60); Honolulu, Hawaii, U.S.
- Listed height: 6 ft 3 in (1.91 m)
- Listed weight: 300 lb (136 kg)

Career information
- High school: Iolani School (Honolulu, Hawaii)
- College: Washington
- NFL draft: 1990: 1st round, 23rd overall pick

Career history
- Los Angeles/St. Louis Rams (1990–1997)

Awards and highlights
- Second-team All-American (1989); Morris Trophy (1989)

Career NFL statistics
- Games played: 105
- Games started: 85
- Fumble recoveries: 1
- Stats at Pro Football Reference

Bern Orion Brostek (born September 11, 1966) is an American former professional football player who was an offensive lineman in the National Football League (NFL) for the Los Angeles/St. Louis Rams from 1990 to 1997.

== Early life ==
Brostek played high school football for Iolani School in Honolulu, Hawaii. Iolani is also known for sending Albert Tufono, Meki Pei and Willie Kava to the University of Washington.

== College career ==
Brostek attended the University of Washington where he lettered in football. Brostek was one of the top offensive linemen in the nation while at Washington, and received numerous honors during his time there.

His honors included:

- 1988 Rising Award (given to the most outstanding lineman at Washington).
- 1989 John P. Angel Award (given to the most outstanding offensive lineman at Washington).
- 1989 Morris Trophy (given to the most outstanding lineman in the Pac-10).
- 1989 Pete Gross Player of the year Award (given to the most outstanding player at Washington).

== Professional career ==
Pre-draft measurables
Height	Weight	Arm length	Hand span	40-yard dash	10-yard split	20-yard split	20-yard shuttle	Vertical jump	Broad jump	Bench press
6 ft 2 5/8 in (1.90 m)	300 lb (136 kg)	32 in (0.81 m)	9 3/8 in (0.24 m)	5.34 s	1.87 s	3.01 s	4.87 s	28.5 in (0.72 m)	8 ft 3 in (2.51 m)	25 reps
All values from NFL Combine

Brostek was selected in the first round of the 1990 NFL draft by the Los Angeles Rams with the 23rd overall pick. Brostek played center and guard for the Rams throughout his career. After playing left guard for part of 1991, he replaced Doug Smith as the starting center for the Rams in 1992. Brostek did not miss a down during the 1992 season. He remained the starting center up to the 1996 season. Brostek started every game for the Rams in 4 seasons (1992,1993,1995,1996), including a string of 35 consecutive starts, but, in his final year (1997), he played only a single game. On October 9, 1997, Brostek was placed on the injured reserve list for back problems, and his career ended. In that 1992–1997 span, the Rams never had a winning season, though Brostek blocked for 1,000-yard rushers such as Cleveland Gary and Jerome Bettis. In 1997, the Rams finished in last place in the NFC West division with a won-lost record of 5–11, and he was replaced at starting center by Mike Gruttadauria.

Some of Brostek's teammates included Jackie Slater, Keith Loneker, Jim Everett, Henry Ellard, Flipper Anderson, Lawrence Phillips, Tony Banks, Chris Miller, Sean Landeta, and Isaac Bruce.

== Personal life ==
Brostek is currently a high school football coach at Hawaii Preparatory Academy in Hawaii. One of Brostek's former players, Max Unger played football for the New Orleans Saints after being part of a trade that sent Jimmy Graham to the Seattle Seahawks, and his son, Shane Brostek, committed to the University of Washington on a football scholarship.

== Bibliography ==
- Carroll, Bob (1999). Total Football II: The Official Encyclopedia of the National Football League. New York: HarperCollins.
- Daves, Jim and W. Thomas Porter (2000). The Glory of Washington. Seattle: Sport Publishing, Inc.
