= Jackie Slater =

American football player and coach (born 1954)

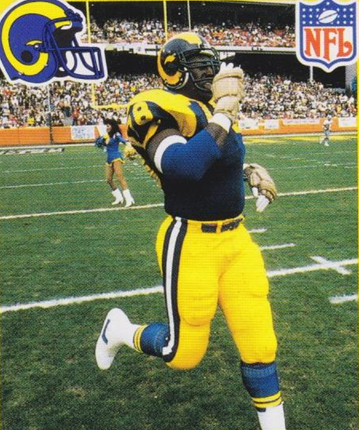
- Slater on a 1987 card

No. 78
- Position: Offensive tackle

Personal information
- Born: May 27, 1954 (age 72); Jackson, Mississippi, U.S.
- Listed height: 6 ft 4 in (1.93 m)
- Listed weight: 277 lb (126 kg)

Career information
- High school: Wingfield (Jackson)
- College: Jackson State (1972–1975)
- NFL draft: 1976: 3rd round, 86th overall pick

Career history

Playing
- Los Angeles / St. Louis Rams (1976–1995)

Coaching
- Oakland Raiders (2006) Co-offensive line; Azusa Pacific (2011–2018) Offensive line

Awards and highlights
- 4× Second-team All-Pro (1983, 1986, 1987, 1989); 7× Pro Bowl (1983, 1985–1990); St. Louis Football Ring of Fame; Los Angeles Rams No. 78 retired

Career NFL statistics
- Games played: 259
- Games started: 211
- Stats at Pro Football Reference
- Pro Football Hall of Fame

Jackie Ray Slater (born May 27, 1954), nicknamed "Big Bad Jackie", is an American former professional football player who was an offensive tackle for 20 seasons in the National Football League (NFL). He played his entire career with the Rams franchise: 19 seasons in Los Angeles, from 1976 to 1994, and one game in St. Louis in 1995. Slater holds the record amongst all offensive linemen who have played the most seasons with one franchise.

A graduate of Jackson State University, he was a teammate of Walter Payton. Drafted in the third round of the 1976 NFL draft, Slater seldom played his first few years before starting in 1979. Known as the most consistent member of one of the most potent offensive lines in NFL history, Slater was selected to seven Pro Bowls and broke a record for most seasons with one team. His jersey number was retired and he was inducted to the Pro Football Hall of Fame in 2001.

Slater was most recently the offensive line coach at Azusa Pacific University in Azusa, California. His son, Matthew Slater, is a former special teams player for the New England Patriots.

== College career ==
Slater was born in Jackson, Mississippi. He was the first member of his family to attend a desegregated school, Wingfield High School. He attended Jackson State University, where he played three years alongside Walter Payton, who personally recruited him. Slater was selected to the Southwestern Athletic Conference All-Star Game three times. After his senior season, he was invited to participate in the College All-Star Game, the last of the series.

== Professional career ==
Used primarily as a backup and special teams player during his first three seasons, Slater became the starting right tackle in 1979, winning the job in training camp from veteran John Williams, who held the position the previous six years. The 1979 Rams went to Super Bowl XIV, losing to the Pittsburgh Steelers. In 1980, he was part of an offensive line that surrendered just 29 sacks and helped the Rams' offense finish second in the NFL in total yards gained with 6,006.

In 1983, Rams' offensive line allowed a league-low 23 sacks while also blocking for running back Eric Dickerson's rookie rushing record of 1,808 yards. On September 25, Slater took exception to New York Jets defensive end Mark Gastineau, who showboated after beating Slater for a sack, leading to a bench-clearing brawl that saw both players get ejected. The next season, Slater suffered a season-ending injury in week seven vs. the New Orleans Saints. Despite Slater's absence in the final nine weeks, Dickerson set the single-season rushing record with 2,105 yards

In 1985, Slater was a key blocker for Dickerson as he ran for a playoff record 248 yards and two touchdowns against the Dallas Cowboys in an NFL divisional game. However, Slater was overpowered by Chicago Bears linemen Dan Hampton, Steve McMichael and William Perry in the NFC championship game eight days later as the Bears' famous 46 defense smothered Dickerson and quarterback Dieter Brock. The Bears won 24–0, then routed the New England Patriots 46–10 in Super Bowl XX.

Slater was considered the most consistent member of one of the best offensive lines in the NFL, which also included Pro Bowlers Kent Hill and Dennis Harrah, and was recognized for his "work ethic and leadership skills" when he was inducted to the Hall of Fame. He retired after the 1995 season when injuries reduced him to playing one game the entire year, the Rams' first in the TWA Dome vs. the Carolina Panthers. He is the only player in league history to play for one single team/franchise in three different cities (Los Angeles 1976–1979, Anaheim 1980–1994, and St. Louis 1995). Due to his longevity, Slater was also teammates with multiple Hall of Famers from multiple Rams eras such as Merlin Olsen, Jack Youngblood, Joe Namath, Eric Dickerson, Jerome Bettis, Kevin Greene and Isaac Bruce.

He was voted the National Football League Players Association's NFC Offensive Lineman of the Year four times—1983, 1986, 1987, and 1989—and was the Bart Starr Award winner after the 1995 season. Slater played in 259 games from 1976 to 1995, a then-record for offensive lineman. He was the second player to play 20 seasons for one team following Cleveland Browns tackle/kicker Lou Groza. This record was later matched by Washington Redskins cornerback Darrell Green, Detroit Lions kicker Jason Hanson, and New England Patriots quarterback Tom Brady. He played for 24 quarterbacks and 37 running backs. Former teammate Jim Everett stated "Jackie Slater is proof they were playing football in the prehistoric days". He was Dickerson's Hall of Fame presenter in 1999. In 2001, Slater was enshrined in the Pro Football Hall of Fame.

== Coaching career ==
After his football career ended, Slater worked for an ABC affiliate in Los Angeles. He participated as a guest coach during St. Louis Rams training camps in the early 2000s. On February 16, 2006, Oakland Raiders head coach Art Shell hired him to become offensive line coach alongside Irv Eatman. Slater was hired to mentor Robert Gallery, who was moving to left tackle. Gallery struggled that season and Slater was released by the Raiders for the 2007 season and replaced by Tom Cable. He was most recently the offensive line coach at Azusa Pacific University in Azusa, California.

== Personal life ==
Slater's son, Matthew Slater, played college football at UCLA and was drafted by the New England Patriots in the fifth round of the 2008 NFL draft. He was a gunner and special teams captain for the Patriots. The Slaters have 17 Pro Bowl nods between them, making the Slater family the third most-nominated family in history behind the Matthews family (25) and the Manning family (20). Slater and his family live in Orange County, California.

Slater is active with the NFL Play 60 program, which sends NFL players to schools to discuss spending 60 minutes a day to participate in sports activities.

== See also ==
- List of Los Angeles Rams players
- History of the Los Angeles Rams
- List of National Football League records (individual)
- List of second generation National Football League players
