= Mike Jones (linebacker, born 1969) =

American football player and coach (born 1969)

No. 52, 55, 51, 95
- Position: Linebacker

Personal information
- Born: April 15, 1969 (age 57); Kansas City, Missouri, U.S.
- Listed height: 6 ft 1 in (1.85 m)
- Listed weight: 240 lb (109 kg)

Career information
- High school: Southwest (Kansas City)
- College: Missouri
- NFL draft: 1991: undrafted

Career history

Playing
- Los Angeles/Oakland Raiders (1991–1996); Sacramento Surge (1992); St. Louis Rams (1997–2000); Pittsburgh Steelers (2001); Oakland Raiders (2002); Pittsburgh Steelers (2002)

Coaching
- Hazelwood East HS (MO) (2008–2009) Head coach; Southern (2010) Linebackers coach; Lincoln (2011–2016) Head coach; St. Louis University HS (MO) (2017–2019) Head coach

Awards and highlights
- Super Bowl champion (XXXIV); World Bowl champion (1992); St. Louis Rams 10th Anniversary Team

Career NFL statistics
- Tackles: 620
- Sacks: 9.0
- Forced fumbles: 6
- Fumble recoveries: 5
- Interceptions: 8
- Defensive touchdowns: 4
- Stats at Pro Football Reference

Michael Anthony Jones (born April 15, 1969) is an American football coach and former player who played professionally as a linebacker for 13 seasons in the National Football League (NFL). He played in the NFL from 1991 to 2002 with his longest tenure as player with the Oakland Raiders. He also played for the Los Angeles/Oakland Raiders, the St. Louis Rams, and the Pittsburgh Steelers. Jones is best known for making the game-saving tackle ("The Tackle") in Super Bowl XXXIV.

== College career ==
Jones attended college at the University of Missouri from 1987 to 1990, where he played running back. He set the school record for most career receptions by a running back with 72.

== Professional career ==
Pre-draft measurables
Height	Weight	Arm length	Hand span	40-yard dash	10-yard split	20-yard split	20-yard shuttle	Vertical jump	Broad jump	Bench press
6 ft 1 1/8 in (1.86 m)	218 lb (99 kg)	33 in (0.84 m)	10 1/4 in (0.26 m)	4.64 s	1.66 s	2.70 s	4.34 s	34.5 in (0.88 m)	10 ft 6 in (3.20 m)	20 reps

=== Los Angeles/Oakland Raiders (first stint) ===
Jones was undrafted in the 1991 NFL draft, but signed with the Raiders as a rookie free agent, and switched to the linebacker position. Between his rookie and second seasons as a Raider, Jones played for the Sacramento Surge of the World League of American Football where he was the starting middle linebacker for the Surge team that won 1992 World Bowl II. He was the Raiders leading tackler in the 1995 and 1996 seasons.

=== St. Louis Rams ===
Perhaps what Jones is best remembered for is what he did during the final play of Super Bowl XXXIV, which became known as the Tackle, when he tackled then-Tennessee Titans receiver Kevin Dyson at the one-yard line to preserve a Rams victory. During the 1999 regular season that year, he recorded one sack and four interceptions, which he returned for 96 yards and two touchdowns. He also recovered two fumbles, returning them for a combined 51 yards and one for a touchdown. Jones was cut by the Rams following the 2000 season as part of a salary cap purge of high priced veterans.

Jones' role in the Tackle earned him recognition by NFL Top 10 as the tenth entry in its "Top Ten One Shot Wonders" list.

=== Pittsburgh Steelers ===
Jones signed with the Steelers on April 22, 2001.

=== Oakland Raiders (second stint) ===
Jones played his last season with the Raiders, where he finished his 12-year career with nine sacks, eight interceptions, 132 return yards, five fumble recoveries, 94 return yards, and four touchdowns (two interceptions and two fumble recoveries) in 183 games.

== Coaching career ==
After retiring as a player, Jones spent six seasons coaching high school football at Hazelwood East High School in St. Louis, Missouri. He led the team to a state title as the head coach in 2008. In 2010, he coached the linebackers at Southern University in Baton Rouge, Louisiana. He was the head football coach at Lincoln University in Jefferson City, Missouri. Jones is now the head coach at St. Louis University High School.

== Head coaching record ==
=== College ===
Year	Team	Overall	Conference	Standing	Bowl/playoffs
Lincoln Blue Tigers (Mid-America Intercollegiate Athletics Association) (2011–2013)
2011	Lincoln	1–9	0–9	10th	
2012	Lincoln	1–10	1–10	15th	
2013	Lincoln	2–8	2–8	T–11th	
Lincoln Blue Tigers (Great Lakes Valley Conference) (2014–2016)
2014	Lincoln	2–9	1–7	T–8th	
2015	Lincoln	1–10	0–8	9th	
2016	Lincoln*	0–4	0–2	N/A	
Lincoln:		7–50	4–44	*Jones was fired by Lincoln prior to the fifth game.	
Total:		7–50			

=== High school ===
Year	Team	Overall	Conference	Standing	Bowl/playoffs
Hazelwood East Spartans () (2008–2009)
2008	Hazelwood East	11–3	4–3	5th	
2009	Hazelwood East	6–5	5–2	3rd	
Hazelwood East:		17–8	9–5		
St. Louis University Junior Bills () (2017–2019)
2017	St. Louis University	3–7	1–3	4th	
2018	St. Louis University	1–9	0–4	5th	
2019	St. Louis University	5–5	1–3	4th	
St. Louis University:		9–21	2–10		
Total:		26–29			
National championship Conference title Conference division title or championship game berth
