= Ernie Conwell =

American football player (born 1972)

No. 45, 84, 85
- Position: Tight end

Personal information
- Born: August 17, 1972 (age 54); Renton, Washington, U.S.
- Listed height: 6 ft 2 in (1.88 m)
- Listed weight: 255 lb (116 kg)

Career information
- High school: Kentwood (Covington, Washington)
- College: Washington (1991–1995)
- NFL draft: 1996: 2nd round, 59th overall pick

Career history
- St. Louis Rams (1996–2002); New Orleans Saints (2003–2006)

Awards and highlights
- Super Bowl champion (XXXIV); Second-team All-Pro (2001); St. Louis Rams 10th Anniversary Team; First-team All-Pac-10 (1995)

Career NFL statistics
- Receptions: 203
- Receiving yards: 2,188
- Receiving touchdowns: 15
- Stats at Pro Football Reference

Ernest Harold Conwell (born August 17, 1972) is an American former professional football player who was a tight end in the National Football League (NFL). He was drafted by the St. Louis Rams in the second round of the 1996 NFL draft. He played for the Rams for seven seasons. He played college football at Washington. Conwell also played for the New Orleans Saints.

He currently works for the NFL Players Association.

== Early life ==
Conwell graduated from Kentwood High School in Covington, Washington in 1991 right after setting the school record for 800g javelin at 195'1". While there he won the 1990 Washington State 4A Championship in shot put and lettered in football, basketball and track and field for javelin and shot. His nephew, Will Conwell, was also a track and field thrower at Kentwood who set two school records in 2000, 59'4.5" for shot put and 177'9" for discus.

During Conwell's senior year at Washington, he finished with 24 catches for 343 yards and 2 TDs. Until that year, he played behind fellow tight end Mark Bruener. Conwell was also an All-American thrower for the Washington Huskies track and field team, finishing 5th in the shot put at the 1995 NCAA Division I Outdoor Track and Field Championships and 1996 NCAA Division I Outdoor Track and Field Championships.

== Professional career ==
Conwell was drafted by the St. Louis Rams in the second round of the 1996 NFL draft with the 59th overall pick. Conwell missed the end of the 1998 season and most of the 1999 season following November 1998 knee surgery, but did play in the Super Bowl. Despite the injuries, Conwell was re-signed by the Rams in early 2000 to a three-year contract for the 2000–2002 seasons. The 2001 season was Conwell's best, as he notched 38 receptions for 431 yards and was named second-team All-Pro. In 2002, his last season with the Rams, he played in all 16 games and started 11, and finished the season with 34 receptions for 429 yards.

He played for the New Orleans Saints from 2003 until he was released on February 28, 2007.

== NFL career statistics ==
Legend
| | Won the Super Bowl |
| **Bold** | Career high |

=== Regular season ===
| Year | Team | Games | | Receiving | | | | | |
| Year | Team | GP | GS | Tgt | Rec | Yds | Avg | Lng | TD |
|---|---|---|---|---|---|---|---|---|---|
| 1996 | STL | 10 | 8 | 23 | 15 | 164 | 10.9 | 26 | 0 |
| 1997 | STL | 16 | 16 | **60** | **38** | 404 | 10.6 | 46 | **4** |
| 1998 | STL | 7 | 7 | 30 | 15 | 105 | 7.0 | 13 | 0 |
| 1999 | STL | 3 | 0 | 3 | 1 | 11 | 11.0 | 11 | 0 |
| 2000 | STL | 16 | 1 | 9 | 5 | 40 | 8.0 | 17 | 0 |
| 2001 | STL | 16 | 14 | 52 | **38** | **431** | 11.3 | 47 | **4** |
| 2002 | STL | 16 | 11 | 48 | 34 | 419 | 12.3 | **52** | 2 |
| 2003 | NOR | 10 | 10 | 44 | 26 | 290 | 11.2 | 32 | 2 |
| 2004 | NOR | 16 | 11 | 19 | 10 | 102 | 10.2 | 28 | 1 |
| 2005 | NOR | 8 | 8 | 29 | 13 | 165 | **12.7** | 31 | 1 |
| 2006 | NOR | 7 | 5 | 13 | 8 | 57 | 7.1 | 15 | 1 |
| Career | | 125 | 91 | 330 | 203 | 2,188 | 10.8 | 52 | 15 |

=== Playoffs ===
| Year | Team | Games | | Receiving | | | | | |
| Year | Team | GP | GS | Tgt | Rec | Yds | Avg | Lng | TD |
|---|---|---|---|---|---|---|---|---|---|
| 1999 | STL | 3 | 0 | 3 | 3 | 22 | 7.3 | 16 | 0 |
| 2000 | STL | 1 | 0 | 0 | 0 | 0 | 0.0 | 0 | 0 |
| 2001 | STL | 3 | 2 | **8** | **5** | **41** | **8.2** | **19** | 0 |
| Career | | 7 | 2 | 11 | 8 | 63 | 7.9 | 19 | 0 |
