= Rob Havenstein =

American football player (born 1992)

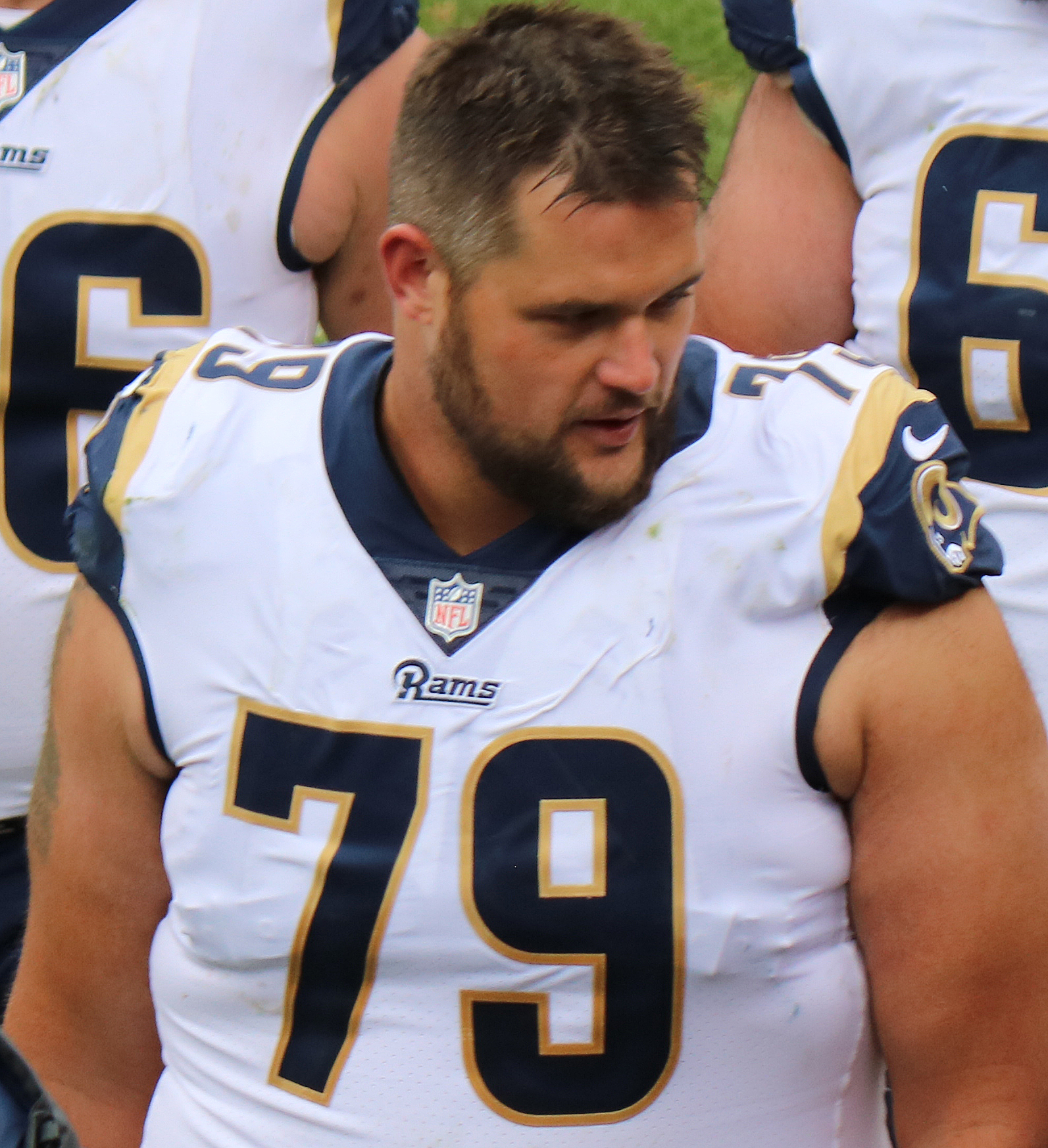
- Havenstein with the Los Angeles Rams in 2018

No. 79
- Position: Offensive tackle

Personal information
- Born: May 13, 1992 (age 34); Mount Airy, Maryland, U.S.
- Listed height: 6 ft 8 in (2.03 m)
- Listed weight: 322 lb (146 kg)

Career information
- High school: Linganore (Frederick, Maryland)
- College: Wisconsin (2010–2014)
- NFL draft: 2015: 2nd round, 57th overall pick

Career history
- St. Louis / Los Angeles Rams (2015–2025)

Awards and highlights
- Super Bowl champion (LVI); PFWA All-Rookie Team (2015); Built Ford Tough Offensive Line of the Year (2018); First-team All-American (2014); First-team All-Big Ten (2014); Second-team All-Big Ten (2013)

Career NFL statistics
- Games played: 148
- Games started: 148
- Stats at Pro Football Reference

Robert Havenstein (born May 13, 1992) is an American former professional football player who spent his entire 11-year career as an offensive tackle for the St. Louis / Los Angeles Rams of the National Football League (NFL). He played college football for the Wisconsin Badgers.

== Early life ==
Havenstein committed to the University of Wisconsin–Madison on October 21, 2009. He held numerous Power 5 offers.

College recruiting
Name	Hometown	School	Height	Weight	40^{‡}	Commit date
Rob Havenstein; OG/OT	Frederick, MD	Linganore	6 ft 7 in (2.01 m)	345 lb (156 kg)	5.4	Oct 21, 2009
Rob Havenstein; OG/OT	Recruit ratings: Scout: Rivals: 247Sports: ESPN:					
Overall recruit ranking: Scout: #38 OG Rivals: #43 OG 247Sports: #30 OG ESPN: #33 OG
‡ Refers to 40-yard dash; Note: In many cases, Scout, Rivals, 247Sports, On3, and ESPN may conflict in their listings of height, weight and 40 time.; In these cases, the average was taken. ESPN grades are on a 100-point scale.; Sources: "Rivals.com 2010 Wisconsin Football Commitments". Rivals.; "Scout.com 2010 Wisconsin Football Commits". Scout.; "ESPN 2010 Wisconsin Football Commits". ESPN.; "Scout.com Team Recruiting Rankings". Scout.; "2010 Team Ranking". Rivals.com.; "247sports.com 2010 Wisconsin Football Commits". 247Sports.

== College career ==
Havenstein played on Wisconsin's offensive line as a right tackle from 2010 through 2014. During his five seasons, Havenstein played in 54 games and started in 42 of them. Havenstein was a redshirt freshman in 2010. He played in 12 games in 2011, started every game for his remaining three years. In 2013, Havenstein was named 2nd-Team All-Big Ten Conference by the media. At the end of the 2014 season, he was named consensus 1st-Team All-Big Ten and 1st-Team All-American by the American Football Coaches Association. Havenstein was also the only Badgers player invited to play in the 2015 Senior Bowl.

== Professional career ==
Pre-draft measurables
Height	Weight	Arm length	Hand span	Wingspan	40-yard dash	10-yard split	20-yard split	20-yard shuttle	Three-cone drill	Vertical jump	Broad jump	Bench press	Wonderlic
6 ft 7 3/8 in (2.02 m)	321 lb (146 kg)	33 3/4 in (0.86 m)	9 7/8 in (0.25 m)	6 ft 10 1/4 in (2.09 m)	5.46 s	1.88 s	3.16 s	4.87 s	8.28 s	28.5 in (0.72 m)	8 ft 0 in (2.44 m)	20 reps	25
All values from NFL Combine/Pro Day

Havenstein was drafted by the St. Louis Rams in the second round (57th overall) of the 2015 NFL draft. As a rookie, he started 13 games at right tackle and did not allow a sack all season. At the end of the season, Havenstein was named to Pro Football Writers of America's All Rookie Team with Rams' teammate Todd Gurley. In the 2016 season, Havenstein appeared in and started 15 games for the Rams.

On April 11, 2017, it was announced that Havenstein would be moved inside to guard after the signing of Andrew Whitworth, which would've moved left tackle Greg Robinson over to the right, Havenstein's previous position. However, after Robinson was traded to the Detroit Lions, Havenstein remained the Rams starting right tackle to start 2017. He appeared in and started 15 regular season games and the Rams' one postseason game.

On August 20, 2018, Havenstein signed a four-year contract extension with the Rams through the 2022 season. He started all 16 games in 2018 and helped Rams win 13 games and earned the second seed in the National Football Conference (NFC). The Rams defeated the Dallas Cowboys in the Divisional Round and the New Orleans Saints in the NFC Championship Game to reach Super Bowl LIII, where they would lose to the New England Patriots by a score of 13–3.

In the 2019 season, Havenstein started in the first nine games for the Rams before suffering a knee injury which ended his season.

In the 2020 season, Havenstein appeared in and started all 16 regular season games and both of the Rams' postseason games.

In the 2021 season, Havenstein appeared in and started 15 regular season games and all four games of the Rams' postseason run. After downing the Arizona Cardinals in an NFC Wild Card Game, Los Angeles dethroned the defending world champion Tampa Buccaneers, then defeated the San Francisco 49ers in the NFC Championship Game to advance to Super Bowl LVI. Playing on their home field at SoFi Stadium, Havenstein and the Rams defeated the Cincinnati Bengals 23–20.

On September 8, 2022, Havenstein signed a three-year, $34.5 million contract extension with $24.1 million guaranteed. In the 2022 season, Havenstein started in all 17 regular season games for the Rams.

During the 2023 season, Havenstein was listed as inactive in Weeks 8, 9, and 15 and missed three starts. He started the other 14 games and the Rams' 24–23 Wild Card Round loss to the Detroit Lions. In the 2024 season, he appeared in 11 regular season games and two postseason games.

Havenstein began the 2025 campaign as Los Angeles' primary right tackle, starting all seven of the games he appeared in. Despite playing every offensive snap in Week 11 against the Seattle Seahawks, Havenstein was placed on injured reserve due to ankle and knee bursitis on November 19, 2025, and did not see any further action during the regular season or the playoffs.

On February 10, 2026, Havenstein announced his retirement from professional football. Havenstein started in all 161 games (148 regular season, 13 postseason) that he played in, and he was the last Rams player to have played continuously from the team's time in St. Louis.
