= John LoVetere =

American football player (1936–2012)

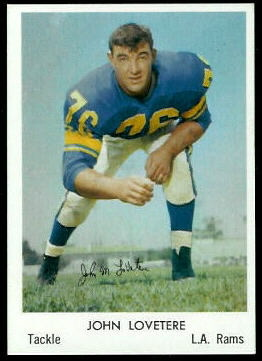
- LoVetere in 1959

No. 76
- Position: Defensive tackle

Personal information
- Born: May 31, 1936; Boston, Massachusetts, U.S.
- Died: October 27, 2012 (aged 76); Watertown, Tennessee, U.S.
- Listed height: 6 ft 4 in (1.93 m)
- Listed weight: 280 lb (127 kg)

Career information
- High school: Paramount (Paramount, California)
- College: Compton College
- NFL draft: 1959: undrafted

Career history
- Los Angeles Rams (1959–1962); New York Giants (1963–1965)

Awards and highlights
- Pro Bowl (1963)

Career NFL statistics
- Fumble recoveries: 8
- Sacks: 23
- Stats at Pro Football Reference

John Manning LoVetere (May 31, 1936 – October 27, 2012) was an American professional football player who was a defensive tackle for seven seasons in the National Football League (NFL) with the Los Angeles Rams and New York Giants. He played college football at Compton Junior College.

LoVetere lived in Watertown, Tennessee until his death.
