= Robert Young (American football) =

American football player (born 1969)

No. 76, 99
- Position: Defensive lineman

Personal information
- Born: January 29, 1969 (age 57); Jackson, Mississippi, U.S.
- Listed height: 6 ft 6 in (1.98 m)
- Listed weight: 273 lb (124 kg)

Career information
- High school: Carthage (MS)
- College: Mississippi State
- NFL draft: 1991: 5th round, 116th overall pick

Career history
- Los Angeles/St. Louis Rams (1991–1995); Houston Oilers (1996); New Orleans Saints (1998)*
- * Offseason or practice squad member only

Career NFL statistics
- Tackles: 138
- Sacks: 20.5
- Forced fumbles: 2
- Stats at Pro Football Reference

Robert E. Young (born January 29, 1969) is an American former professional football player who played defensive lineman for six seasons for the Los Angeles/St. Louis Rams and the Houston Oilers.

== College career ==
Young played college football at Mississippi State University where he was a four-year letterman. In 1987, he made the SEC All-Freshman team. In 1989, he was the top sacker (10) a defensive line that set a school record for sacks in a season with 33 (since broken) and most sacks in a game with 9 (since tied). Young ended his collegiate career with 16 sacks which is still seventh in school history. Young is now a middle school head coach for Ronald Reagan Middle School in Texas.

== Professional career ==
=== Los Angeles Rams ===
Young was drafted by the Los Angeles Rams in the fifth round of the 1991 NFL draft with the 116th overall pick. He earned a starting position as a rookie in 1991. He was a backup for in 1992. In 1993, he moved to defensive end and got off to a fast start, logging 7 sacks in 6 games before a knee injury ended his season. He came back to start all 16 games at defensive end in 1994 and had 6.5 sacks which led the team. In 1995 the arrival of Kevin Carter, the sixth overall pick in the 1995 NFL draft forced Young to the bench. He backed up left defensive end Carter and right defensive end Sean Gilbert in 1995.

=== Houston Oilers ===
In 1996 Young was traded to the Houston Oilers for a sixth-round pick in the 1997 NFL draft. He played in 15 games for the Oilers, starting 13 at defensive tackle recording four sacks.
