= Leonard Little =

American football player (born 1974)

No. 57, 91
- Position: Defensive end

Personal information
- Born: October 19, 1974 (age 52); Asheville, North Carolina, U.S.
- Listed height: 6 ft 3 in (1.91 m)
- Listed weight: 267 lb (121 kg)

Career information
- High school: Asheville
- College: Tennessee
- NFL draft: 1998: 3rd round, 65th overall pick

Career history
- St. Louis Rams (1998–2009)

Awards and highlights
- Super Bowl champion (XXXIV); First-team All-Pro (2003); Pro Bowl (2003); 2× NFL forced fumbles co-leader (2002, 2003); St. Louis Rams 10th Anniversary Team; First-team All-American (1997); Third-team All-American (1996); 2× First-team All-SEC (1996, 1997); Second-team All-SEC (1995)

Career NFL statistics
- Tackles: 390
- Sacks: 87.5
- Forced fumbles: 31
- Fumble recoveries: 9
- Interceptions: 2
- Defensive touchdowns: 3
- Stats at Pro Football Reference

Leonard Antonio Little (born October 19, 1974) is an American former professional football player who was a defensive end for the St. Louis Rams of the National Football League (NFL). Little played college football for the Tennessee Volunteers, and was recognized as an All-American. He was selected by the Rams in the third round of the 1998 NFL draft, and played his entire twelve-year professional career with them.

Little killed a woman in a drunk driving incident in 1998, and later pleaded guilty to involuntary manslaughter.

== Early life ==
Little attended Asheville High School in Asheville, North Carolina, where he played both linebacker and wide receiver. At AHS, he was a three-year starter. For his senior year, Little was named a Super Prep, Blue Chip, Prep Football Report as well as a First-team All-American. In November 2005, his high school retired his #30 jersey.

== College career ==
Little played a single season at Coffeyville Community College in Coffeyville, Kansas, before going to play three seasons at University of Tennessee, where he started every game at Middle Linebacker during his senior season, leading the team in tackles (87) and sacks (8.5). He was first-team All-America and first-team All-Southeastern Conference in his senior season. He appeared in the first seven games of his junior season at defensive end, tallying 33 tackles, 8.5 sacks, and five tackles for losses, also blocking one field goal and forcing four fumbles. As a sophomore, he started every game at left defensive end and recorded 62 tackles and a career-high eleven sacks. Little’s 28 career sacks rank 3rd all time at Tennessee, behind only Derek Barnett (33) and Reggie White (32). Little graduated from Tennessee with a bachelor's degree in psychology.

== Professional career ==
=== Pre-draft ===
Pre-draft measurables
Height	Weight	Arm length	Hand span	Bench press
6 ft 3 3/8 in (1.91 m)	237 lb (108 kg)	34 1/4 in (0.87 m)	10 1/2 in (0.27 m)	18 reps
All values from NFL Combine

Little measured 6-3½, 237 pounds and ran the 40-yard dash in 4.48 seconds. Little was expected to be a first-round draft choice, but his "in-between" size left teams not sure if he would be a linebacker or a defensive end in the NFL.

=== St. Louis Rams ===
The St. Louis Rams picked Leonard Little as the fourth pick in the third round of the 1998 NFL draft, the 65th overall pick. The Rams made a last moment trade to the 65th pick on concerns that the Steelers would take Little with the 66th pick. When Rams coach Dick Vermeil called, Little was being congratulated by Bill Cowher, the Pittsburgh coach, on being drafted by the Steelers.

He signed a 3-year, $1.2 million contract on July 2, 1998, with a $400,000 signing bonus. Little began his NFL career as a linebacker, donning uniform number 57. As a gunner on kickoff and punt coverage Little made eight tackles. He was inactive for four games before being placed on the non-football injury list due to legal issues surrounding his drunk driving crash.

The NFL suspended Little for 8 games of the 1999 season. The suspension cost Little $125,000, half his seasonal salary. He returned to the Rams at mid-season and performed mostly on special teams with a season-high four special teams tackles vs. the New York Giants on December 19, 1999, ending the season with nine special teams tackles. He also would spell Rams defensive ends Kevin Carter and Grant Wistrom and was in the game for Wistrom for the play known as "The Tackle" in Super Bowl XXXIV.

In 2000, he played at the defensive end position, coming into games to play left defensive end in passing situations, with starting end Kevin Carter "reducing" down to left defensive tackle. He also spelled right defensive end Grant Wistrom. Little added 20 pounds with weight training and extra eating to help him make the switch and in that role Little had 5 sacks and totaled 17 tackles. He also had 18 tackles on special teams in 2000.

On April 24, 2001, Leonard Little agreed to a one-year tender offer of $512,000, the minimum level for a restricted free agent. That season, he changed his jersey number to 91 and was a pass-rush specialist for the NFC champion Rams. Little would enter games in passing situations in place of starting left defensive end Chidi Ahanotu. In that role, Little led the Rams with 14.5 sacks, 3rd in the NFL. Little had nine tackles (five solo), three QB pressures, and one sack in Super Bowl XXXVI. On the first play of the New England Patriot game-winning drive Little brushed the ball but could not dislodge it from Tom Brady, who kept the drive alive by completing a short pass. Little also continued his role as a special teamer, making 11 tackles.

On March 4, 2002, Little signed a five-year $17.5 million contract. That year Little earned the starting left defensive end job and performed very well, despite the fact he was considered small for a "base" defensive end in the NFL. He played the run well and upgraded his play against the pass as well. Rams defensive line coach Bill Kollar said, "He's become an every-down player, he's doing a good job in the running game, and his pass rush is better. He recorded 12 sacks (6th most in the NFL) and a franchise-record nine forced fumbles for the season (surpassing Deacon Jones's six in 1968). Little's ability to strip quarterbacks of the ball was noted by Sports Illustrated's Paul Zimmerman who picked Little as the "best in the business to go for the strip". He played notably in the season finale against the San Francisco 49ers by recording nine tackles (five solo), one QB pressure, a season-high 2 sacks, and a career-high three forced fumbles.

The following year, he was named an All-Pro and Pro Bowl selection; he had 12.5 sacks, third in the NFC (fourth in the NFL), six forced fumbles and an interception. Against the Minnesota Vikings on November 30, 2003, Little had eight tackles (six solo), a career-best four sacks, three QB pressures, and two forced fumbles. Vikings offensive coordinator Scott Linehan said that Little "wrecked the game plan, just wrecked it." In addition to the four sacks, Viking offensive right tackles were called for four penalties attempting to block Little. For his efforts Little was named the NFC Defensive Player of the Week.

In 2004, Little started all 16 games and recorded just 7 sacks, however, the down year was attributable to being double-teamed or "chip-blocked" on the majority of passing downs. "They never leave him alone," Rams coach Mike Martz said. "Very seldom is he single blocked nd {sic} if he is, it's a quick throw. Opponents have great respect for him". Little added, "It's been the first year where they're just constantly chipping me . . . Last year, they'd do it off and on, but not as often as now.". Despite the fewer sacks Little was voted as an alternate to the Pro Bowl. Little also scored his first two NFL touchdowns in 2004, he picked up four fumbles and returned two of them for scores.

On September 11, 2005, against the 49ers he had nine tackles (four solo), 2.0 sacks, and two forced fumbles. He continued his fast start, with four sacks in the first six games but slumped after the death of his brother, Jermaine, who was murdered in Harriman, Tennessee, on October 18, 2005. ". . .Leonard's struggling," interim coach Joe Vitt said. "He's grieving right now, and our football team—everybody here, is lending our support to him.". Little missed two games and did not record a sack in the next five games. He ended with 5.5 sacks and two forced fumbles over the final three games and to lead the Rams with 9.5 sacks and four forced fumbles in 2005.

In Week 11 of the 2006 season, Little signed a 3-year $19.5 million contract extension that included a $6.1 million signing bonus. Little started all 16 games and led the team with 13.0 sacks (tied for second in the NFC, tied for fifth in the NFL), seven forced fumbles and also recorded a career-high of 58 tackles and was again a Pro Bowl alternate.

Little sprained his big toe when his left foot was caught in the turf in a 22-3 loss at Baltimore on October 14, 2007. On November 5, 2007, Little was placed on injured reserve, ending his season with only one sack, and had surgery that week to repair the torn ligament in his left big toe. Little agreed to restructure his contract to remain with the Rams. He was due a $7.17 million roster bonus that would have counted as $9.5 million against the Rams' 2008 salary cap. The restructuring converted the roster bonus to a signing bonus, which meant it would be spread over the last two years of the contract, essentially cutting the cap number by nearly $3.6 million and resulting in a $5.9 million cap number for Little in 2008.

In 2008, Little was again slowed by injuries, this time a hamstring injury in the season opener, played in 14 games, starting just five. Often, he was used in passing situations similar to his role in 2001. He was second on the Rams in sacks with six and he also forced two fumbles, giving him a career total of 32. Little had two sacks against Buffalo on September 28, 2008.

For the 2009 season, Little totaled 6½ sacks to lead the team for the sixth time in his career. He started 13 games at left defensive end and was relatively healthy—compared to the previous two seasons. However, he did miss two games with a knee injury. NFL.com's Greg Cosell described one of Little's plays versus the Jacksonville Jaguars as, "Little 36-yard interception return TD was an unbelievable read by Little. He read the flare action by Jones-Drew and the throw by Garrard—a spectacular individual play".

During the 2009 season, Little has dropped hints that he may retire after the season. In the off-season Little, an unrestricted free agent, accepted and then canceled a meeting with the New Orleans Saints to discuss the possibility of signing with the defending Super Bowl champions. Little earned $31.55 million in his twelve NFL seasons. and led his team in sacks six times (2001, 2002, 2003, 2005, 2006, 2008) and had four seasons of twelve or more sacks. Little retired on December 15, 2010.

=== NFL statistics ===
Year	Team	GP	COMB	TOTAL	AST	SACK	FF	FR
1998	STL	6	2	1	1	0.5	0	0
1999	STL	6	1	1	0	0.0	0	0
2000	STL	14	17	12	5	5.0	1	0
2001	STL	13	33	28	5	14.5	2	1
2002	STL	16	44	37	7	12.0	9	1
2003	STL	12	47	41	6	12.5	6	1
2004	STL	16	46	38	8	7.0	1	4
2005	STL	14	56	45	11	9.5	4	2
2006	STL	16	60	57	3	13.0	7	0
2007	STL	7	19	16	3	1.0	1	0
2008	STL	14	18	15	3	6.0	2	0
2009	STL	13	23	19	4	6.5	0	0
Career		147	366	310	56	87.5	33	9

Key

- GP: games played
- COMB: combined tackles
- TOTAL: total tackles
- AST: assisted tackles
- SACK: sacks
- FF: forced fumbles
- FR: fumble recoveries

== Off-field issues ==
=== Manslaughter conviction ===
On October 19, 1998, Little was on his way home from a birthday party when he crashed into and killed 47-year-old Susan Gutweiler in St. Louis, Missouri who was on her way to pick up her son from a concert. When tested, his blood alcohol content was 0.19 percent, 0.11 points exceeding the legal limit of 0.08 in the state of Missouri. Little pleaded guilty to involuntary manslaughter and received a 90-day sentence of work in a city workhouse, four years probation and was ordered to undergo a thousand hours of community service.

On January 18, 2003, with charges dating back to 1999, Little was charged with communicating threats and making harassing calls, according to the Charlotte-Mecklenburg police department. Little's attorney, Scott Rosenblum, said that the charges were filed after Little and his former girlfriend Michelle ended their relationship. Rosenblum added, "We don't think this case is going anywhere. It was groundless from the beginning".

On April 24, 2004, he was arrested again for driving while intoxicated after being stopped by The Ladue Police Department for driving 78 miles per hour in a 55 mile-per-hour zone on Interstate 64. At the time, he had red eyes, smelled of alcohol, and failed three roadside sobriety tests. He later admitted that he drank alcohol to the police. After being convicted of misdemeanor speeding but acquitted of DWI, Little received two years of probation on May 6, 2005, and was prohibited from drinking any sort of alcoholic beverage during his time of probation.
