= Jim Youngblood =

American football player (born 1950)

No. 53, 59
- Position: Linebacker

Personal information
- Born: February 23, 1950 (age 76); Union, South Carolina, U.S.
- Listed height: 6 ft 3 in (1.91 m)
- Listed weight: 235 lb (107 kg)

Career information
- High school: Jonesville (Jonesville, South Carolina)
- College: Tennessee Tech (1969–1972)
- NFL draft: 1973: 2nd round, 42nd overall pick

Career history
- Los Angeles Rams (1973–1984); Washington Redskins (1984)

Awards and highlights
- Second-team All-Pro (1979); Pro Bowl (1979); First-team All-American (1972); 2× First-team Little All-American (1971, 1972)

Career NFL statistics
- Sacks: 15.5
- Fumble recoveries: 4
- Interceptions: 14
- Stats at Pro Football Reference
- College Football Hall of Fame

Jimmy Lee Youngblood (born February 23, 1950) is an American former professional football player who was a linebacker in the National Football League (NFL) for the Los Angeles Rams and Washington Redskins. He played college football for the Tennessee Tech Golden Eagles and was selected in the second round of the 1973 NFL draft.

== Early life ==
Youngblood was born in Union, South Carolina. He attended Jonesville High School in Jonesville, South Carolina, where he was all-conference in football, basketball, and baseball.

== College career ==
Youngblood attended Tennessee Technological University from 1969 to 1972, and set a school record with 476 tackles. The Ohio Valley Conference named him Defensive Player of the Year in 1971 and 1972. He was selected by the Associated Press as a first-team linebacker on the 1972 Little All-America college football team.

== Professional career ==
Youngblood played in the NFL for twelve seasons. He became the Rams' starting left-side linebacker during the 1976 season. Youngblood was part of one of the steadiest linebacking corps in the NFL, with Jack Reynolds in the middle and Isiah Robertson and Bob Brudzinski patrolling the right side. Youngblood had a nose for the football, recording 14 career interceptions and returning four touchdowns, two in the 1979 season.

== Personal life ==
Youngblood's father was a standout semi-pro baseball player, and his mother was a star basketball player in high school in Jonesville. Contrary to common belief he is not related to former teammate and Pro Football Hall of Fame member Jack Youngblood. However, since both Youngbloods had first names beginning with the same letter, the Rams had to include the entire names of both players on the back of their jerseys. Since their last names were so long, neither Jack nor Jim's first names could fit in the same line as their surnames, so the Rams simply put their first names above their last names when they ordered the jerseys.

Preceded by Lawrence McCutcheon	Rams Most Valuable Player Award; 1978	Succeeded by Jack Youngblood
