= Jerry Gray =

American football player and coach (born 1962)

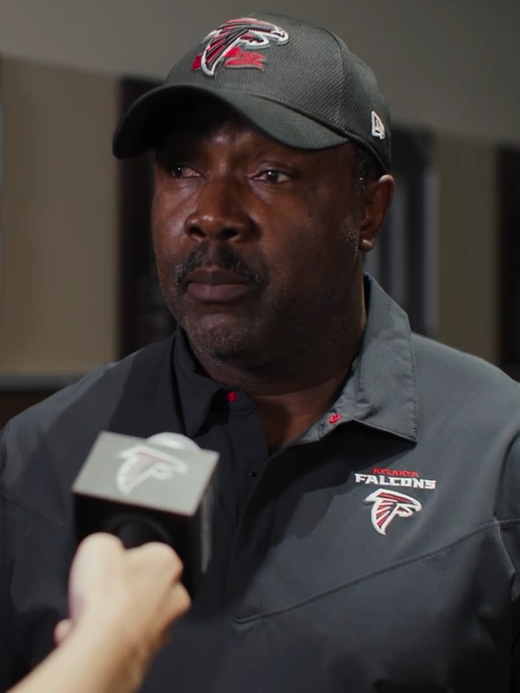
- Gray in 2023

San Francisco 49ers
- Title: Defensive pass-game coordinator

Personal information
- Born: December 16, 1962 (age 63); Lubbock, Texas, U.S.
- Listed height: 6 ft 0 in (1.83 m)
- Listed weight: 183 lb (83 kg)

Career information
- Position: Cornerback (No. 25, 21, 20)
- High school: Estacado (Lubbock)
- College: Texas
- NFL draft: 1985: 1st round, 21st overall pick

Career history

Playing
- Los Angeles Rams (1985–1991); Houston Oilers (1992); Tampa Bay Buccaneers (1993)

Coaching
- SMU (1995–1996) Defensive backs coach; Tennessee Oilers (1997–1998) Defensive quality control coach; Tennessee Titans (1999–2000) Defensive backs coach; Buffalo Bills (2001–2005) Defensive coordinator; Washington Redskins (2006–2009) Defensive backs coach; Seattle Seahawks (2010) Defensive backs coach; Tennessee Titans (2011–2013) Defensive coordinator; Minnesota Vikings (2014–2019) Defensive backs coach; Green Bay Packers (2020) Defensive backs coach; Green Bay Packers (2021–2022) Defensive backs/passing game coordinator; Atlanta Falcons (2023–2025) Assistant head coach/defense; San Francisco 49ers (2026–present) Defensive pass-game coordinator

Awards and highlights
- 2× Second-team All-Pro (1986, 1989); 4× Pro Bowl (1986–1989); 1990 Pro Bowl MVP; Unanimous All-American (1984); Consensus All-American (1983); SWC Defensive Player of the Year (1983); 2× First-team All-SWC (1983, 1984)

Career NFL statistics
- Interceptions: 28
- Interception yards: 374
- Touchdowns: 3
- Stats at Pro Football Reference
- Coaching profile at Pro Football Reference
- College Football Hall of Fame

Jerry Don Gray (born December 16, 1962) is an American football coach and former player who is the defensive pass-game coordinator for the San Francisco 49ers of the National Football League (NFL). Gray played college football for the Texas Longhorns, twice garnering consensus All-American honors. Thereafter, he played professionally for the Los Angeles Rams, Houston Oilers, and Tampa Bay Buccaneers of the NFL.

== Early life ==
Gray was born in Lubbock, Texas. He attended Lubbock Estacado High School. He was inducted into the Lubbock ISD Hall of Honor in 2011.

== College career ==
Gray was a two-time consensus first-team All-American at the University of Texas. During his career, he was known for being an especially hard hitter. He had 297 career tackles, 16 interceptions and 20 passes broken up and played on four bowl teams at Texas coached by Fred Akers. In 1996 he was inducted into the University of Texas Hall of Honor. In 2013, he was inducted into the College Football Hall of Fame.

== Professional career ==
Gray was the Rams' first-round choice in the 1985 NFL Draft and played seven years in Los Angeles before finishing his career with the Oilers in 1992 and the Buccaneers in 1993. He had 28 career interceptions, including six for the Oilers in 1992.

Gray was selected to the Pro Bowl four times attending the game from 1986 through 1989. In his final appearance he earned Pro Bowl MVP honors after recording 7 tackles and a 51-yard interception return for a touchdown.

In 2001, Gray was nominated for the Pro Football Hall of Fame, but was not chosen as a semi-finalist.

== Coaching career ==
=== SMU ===
After retiring as a player, Gray turned to coaching. His coaching career began in 1995 as a defensive backs coach for the SMU Mustangs football team.

=== Tennessee Oilers/Titans ===
He then worked for the Tennessee Oilers as a Defensive Quality Control coach from 1997 to 1998 before being promoted to defensive backs coach in 1999 when the team name was changed from "Oilers" to "Titans". He was with the team when they won the AFC Championship and went to Super Bowl XXXIV.

=== Buffalo Bills ===
In 2001, he was hired by former Titans defensive coordinator Gregg Williams to run the Buffalo Bills defense the same year Williams left Tennessee to become the Buffalo Head Coach. He served as the defensive coordinator for the Buffalo Bills from 2001 to 2005, where he oversaw one of the top defenses in the NFL until his final season. The Bills ranked 2nd in total defense in both 2003 and 2004.

=== Washington Redskins ===
After the 2005 season he was hired by the Washington Redskins to serve as their defensive backs coach

=== Seattle Seahawks ===
On January 18, 2010, Gray was hired as the new defensive backs coach for the Seattle Seahawks where he coached the rookie safety tandem of Earl Thomas and Kam Chancellor. The Seahawks won the NFC West and beat the defending Super Bowl champion Saints in the Wild Card round. They ultimately lost to Bears in the Divisional playoffs.

=== Texas Longhorns ===
On January 17, 2011, Gray agreed to return to his alma mater Texas as the assistant head coach and defensive backs coach.

=== Tennessee Titans (second stint) ===
On February 12, 2011, however, Gray rejoined the Titans as their defensive coordinator.

=== Minnesota Vikings ===
On January 22, 2014, Gray was hired as the new defensive backs coach for the Minnesota Vikings. In his six seasons with the team, the Vikings went to the playoffs three times, won the NFC North twice and went to the 2019 NFC Championship game.

=== Green Bay Packers ===
On January 29, 2020, Gray was hired as defensive backs coach for the Green Bay Packers. On March 1, 2021, Gray was promoted to defensive backs/passing game coordinator. In his three seasons with Green Bay, they won the NFC North twice and went to the 2020 NFC Championship game.

=== Atlanta Falcons ===
On January 31, 2023, Gray was hired as assistant head coach/defense for the Atlanta Falcons.

=== San Francisco 49ers ===
On April 9, 2026, the San Francisco 49ers hired Gray to serve as the team's defensive pass-game coordinator.

== Personal life ==
Gray and his wife Sherry, also from Lubbock, have two sons together. The eldest was a defensive back for the SMU Mustangs.

Gray started the Jerry Gray Foundation in 2002 and it continues to actively supports youth in Lubbock, providing scholarships in partnership with Texas Tech.

== See also ==
- List of Texas Longhorns football All-Americans
- List of Los Angeles Rams first-round draft picks
