= Larry Brooks (American football) =

American football player and coach (born 1950)

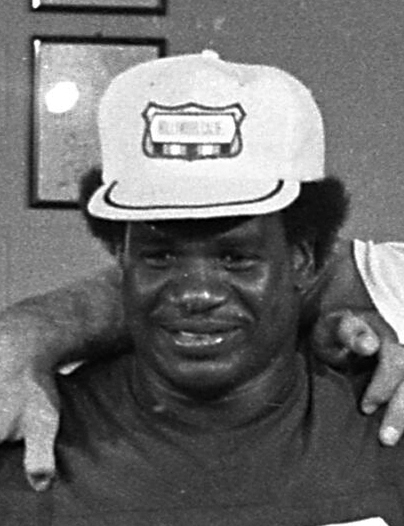
- Brooks in 1975

No. 90
- Position: Defensive tackle

Personal information
- Born: June 10, 1950 (age 76); Prince George, Virginia, U.S.
- Listed height: 6 ft 3 in (1.91 m)
- Listed weight: 255 lb (116 kg)

Career information
- High school: Prince George (VA)
- College: Virginia State
- NFL draft: 1972: 14th round, 355th overall pick

Career history

Playing
- Los Angeles Rams (1972–1982)

Coaching
- Los Angeles Rams (1983–1990) Assistant defensive line coach; Virginia State (1991–1993) Assistant coach; Green Bay Packers (1994–1998) Defensive line coach; Seattle Seahawks (1999–2002) Defensive line coach; Chicago Bears (2003) Defensive line coach; Detroit Lions (2004–2005) Defensive line coach; Arizona Cardinals (2006) Defensive line coach

Operations
- Virginia State (1993) Athletic director

Awards and highlights
- As a player: 2× First-team All-Pro (1977, 1979); 2× Second-team All-Pro (1974, 1978); 5× Pro Bowl (1976–1980); First-team Little All-American (1971); As a coach: Super Bowl champion (XXXI)

Career NFL statistics
- Fumble recoveries: 4
- Stats at Pro Football Reference

Lawrence Lee Brooks Sr. (born June 10, 1950) is an American former professional football player who was a defensive tackle for the Los Angeles Rams of the National Football League (NFL). Brooks played college football for the Virginia State Trojans and was selected in the 14th round of the 1972 NFL draft by the Rams. He was inducted into the Virginia Sports Hall of Fame in 2000.

== Early life and college ==
Virginia Sport Hall of Fame 2000 inductee, Larry Brooks, a native of Prince George and a Prince George High School standout, made a name for himself at every level of athletics. In high school, he was selected as an All-Central District choice as a defensive end.

Brooks furthered his education and attended Virginia State University, where he was named to the Associated Press Little All-American team as a defensive tackle in 1971. He also was named Virginia Small College Lineman of the Year and received All-conference honors.

== Professional career ==
Brooks became a starter at right defensive tackle in the 8th game of the season during his rookie year of 1972.

He collected 9 quarterback sacks in 1973 and the Rams defense was tops in the NFL against the run (allowing 1,270 rushing yards) and led the NFL in total defense (allowing just 2,970 yards). Brooks led Ram defensive linemen in tackles for the first time with 76. The 1973 Los Angeles Rams did not allow 300 yards in all 14 games in a 14-game season. in 2008 the Steelers' defense has held opponents to under 300 yards in all 14 games this season, tied for the longest streak to start a season since 1970. However, the Steelers did not break the Rams' record.

In 1974, Brooks tackled opposing passers 11 times as the Rams were first in the NFC with 44 sacks and again led the NFL in allowing the fewest rushing yards with 1302 while allowing the fewest points, 181. That season Brooks was All-NFC as selected by Pro Football Weekly, and Second-team All-Pro by Newspaper Enterprise Association. For the second season in a row, Brooks led all Ram defensive linemen in tackles with 73, not including his 11 sacks, which trailed only Jack Youngblood and Fred Dryer, the team leaders.

He recorded 5 sacks in 1975 before a knee injury shelved him for the second half of the season. The Rams clearly missed him during the NFC Championship loss to Dallas as they were suckered countless times by the Cowboys shotgun in a 37–7 loss. The Rams defense was 2nd in the NFL in rushing defense missing out on leading the NFL for the third consecutive year by a single yard. The Minnesota Vikings allowed 1532 rushing yards, while the Rams allowed 1533, allowing the Vikings to capture that title. Nonetheless, the Rams allowed the fewest points in the NFL for the second straight season with 135 (missing the NFL record by 3 points).

Brooks rebounded in 1976, he was named to the Pro Bowl and was voted Second-team All-NFC by United Press International. His 74 tackles again led Ram defensive linemen, with 13 of those going for a loss, to go along with his 14½ sacks which tied him for the team lead with Jack Youngblood. The Rams led the NFC in rushing defense for the third time in the past four years. They were second only the Pittsburgh Steelers in the NFL in that category.

In 1977, Brooks was named First-team All-Pro by the Pro Football Writers Association and The Sporting News and First-team All-NFC teams among several others. Rams allowed 146 points, 2nd best in the NFL. Brooks's 6½ sacks were 3rd on the team behind Jack Youngblood and Fred Dryer. His 71 tackles (55 solo) led all Rams defensive linemen (again) and returned to the Pro Bowl (again). Was voted the Rams Outstanding Defensive Lineman by the Los Angeles Rams Alumni.

In 1978, he was named Second-team All-Pro by the Associated Press and Newspaper Enterprise Association and First-team All-NFC by United Press International and Pro Football Weekly despite missing the last 2 games of the season plus the NFC championship game with a knee injury. He led Rams in sacks with 8 as Rams were second in the NFC in sacks and led the NFL in total defense for the second time in the last six years. Brooks again led Rams defensive linemen in tackles with 80 (60 of them solo). He was voted to his third Pro Bowl, but missed the game as teammate Cody Jones (who was the first alternate) replaced him.

In 1979, he led the Rams defensive line in tackles with 99 (9 behind the line of scrimmage) and had 6 sacks and knocked down 4 passes as Rams defense led the NFC in sacks with 52. He was named First-team All-Pro by the Associated Press. He ended the season by playing in Super Bowl XIV with an injured ankle as Rams lost to the world champion Pittsburgh Steelers. He also received another post season honor, that of Second-team All-NFC by United Press International.

In 1980, Brooks led the defensive line in tackles with 54. His tackle number was lower than previous years as Rams began a rotation system at tackle with Brooks, Cody Jones (33 tackles-4 sacks), and Mike Fanning (37 tackles-10 sacks), who were all healthy for the first time since 1978. The 1980 season was the first since 1969 that three Ram defensive tackles amassed more than 30 tackles each. In addition to having 8½ sacks (as the Rams defense led the NFC with 56 sacks) Brooks was named to his fifth straight Pro Bowl was Second-team All-NFC by United Press International. That marked the sixth season in seven that Brooks attained post-season honors, in being either All-Pro, All-NFC, or a Pro Bowl selection. It also marked the seventh season in the last eight that Brooks led the Rams defensive linemen in tackles.

The 1981, season was marred by injury as Brooks injured a knee at mid-season. The knee seemingly never fully recovered and Brooks played only two games at the end of the 1982 season.

== Coaching career ==
Brooks retired after the 1982 season and from 1983 to 1990 was assistant defensive line coach for the Rams. He spent eight years with the team, where he was paired with defensive coordinator Fritz Shurmur. He served as the defensive line coach for the Green Bay Packers from 1994 to 1998, the Seattle Seahawks from 1999 to 2002 both under Mike Holmgren, then to the Chicago Bears in 2003, and was the Detroit Lions defensive line coach from 2004 to 2005. He spent the 2006 season as the defensive line coach for the Arizona Cardinals marking his 21st season as an NFL assistant coach and 33rd season in the NFL as either a player or coach.

In 1991, after his 20 years with the Rams (12 as a player, 8 as coach), Brooks returned to his alma mater, where he served as Virginia States’ Assistant Athletic Director and assistant football coach. He was ultimately named athletic director in 1993 before his return to the NFL in 1994.

In 1998, he led the Packers to become the NFL's fourth-ranked defensive unit that held its opponents to 281.7 yards a game, and a rushing defense that allowed just 90.1 rushing yards a game. He worked with former all-time sack leader Reggie White (198) and accepted the opportunity to groom one of the NFL's top sack masters, Michael Sinclair. His line played a major role in Green Bay's Super Bowl XXXI victory when the defense allowed a league low 259.8 yards per game and a meager 3.5-yard per rush average.

As of 2008, Brooks serves as the defensive line coach at his alma mater Virginia State University.

== Notes ==
- Larry Brooks was featured with National Football League Players Association executive director Gene Upshaw on a Drug Enforcement Administration poster. Apparently the poster sent an anti-drug message to teenagers who were also fans of the NFL.
- He made a cameo appearance as a substitute teacher in the ABC sitcom Welcome Back Kotter.
