= Isaac Bruce =

American football player (born 1972)

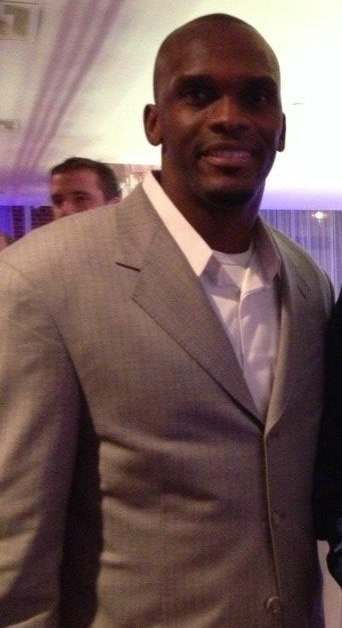
- Bruce in 2013

No. 80, 88
- Position: Wide receiver

Personal information
- Born: November 10, 1972 (age 54); Fort Lauderdale, Florida, U.S.
- Listed height: 6 ft 0 in (1.83 m)
- Listed weight: 188 lb (85 kg)

Career information
- High school: Dillard (Fort Lauderdale)
- College: West Los Angeles (1990); Santa Monica (1991); Memphis (1992–1993)
- NFL draft: 1994: 2nd round, 33rd overall pick

Career history
- Los Angeles / St. Louis Rams (1994–2007); San Francisco 49ers (2008–2009)

Awards and highlights
- Super Bowl champion (XXXIV); Second-team All-Pro (1999); 4× Pro Bowl (1996, 1999–2001); NFL receiving yards leader (1996); First Team All-IFA (1993); Los Angeles Rams No. 80 retired; Memphis Tigers No. 83 retired

Career NFL statistics
- Receptions: 1,024
- Receiving yards: 15,208
- Receiving touchdowns: 91
- Stats at Pro Football Reference
- Pro Football Hall of Fame

Isaac Isidore Bruce (born November 10, 1972) is an American former professional football player who was a wide receiver in the National Football League (NFL). He was selected by the Los Angeles Rams in the second round of the 1994 NFL draft after playing college football for the West Los Angeles Wildcats, the Santa Monica Corsairs, and most notably with the Memphis Tigers.

Nicknamed "The Reverend", he was an All-Pro and four-time Pro Bowl selection, Bruce amassed 15,208 receiving yards in his career (fifth all-time). He played the first 14 years with the Los Angeles / St. Louis Rams and won a Super Bowl ring with the team in Super Bowl XXXIV over the Tennessee Titans. He also played for the San Francisco 49ers. During his time with the Rams, he was the leading wide receiver of "The Greatest Show on Turf". In 2020, Bruce was elected into the Pro Football Hall of Fame.

== Early life ==
Bruce was born in Fort Lauderdale, Florida. He graduated from Dillard High School in Fort Lauderdale in 1990. As a senior for the Panthers football team, he caught 39 passes for 644 yards (16.5 yards per rec. avg.), was an All-County selection, and led his team to the 1989 Florida State 4-A Championship.

== College career ==
Bruce originally signed his letter of intent to play college football for the Purdue Boilermakers in 1990, but his SAT scores were too low for Purdue to accept him. Bruce then decided to attend West Los Angeles College, then to Santa Monica College before transferring to the Memphis State University, where he played beside fellow future NFL receiver Russell Copeland. In 1992, Bruce's first year with Memphis, he had 39 receptions for 532 yards and five touchdowns. In 1993, he became the first wide receiver in program history to post a 1,000-yard receiving season. He finished the season with a school-record 74 catches for 1,054 yards and 10 touchdowns. He earned a degree from Memphis in physical education, and he is the only Memphis player to be selected to the Pro Football Hall of Fame.

== Professional career ==
Pre-draft measurables
Height	Weight	Arm length	Hand span	40-yard dash	10-yard split	20-yard split	20-yard shuttle	Vertical jump
5 ft 11 1/2 in (1.82 m)	173 lb (78 kg)	33 1/8 in (0.84 m)	8 3/4 in (0.22 m)	4.48 s	1.57 s	2.61 s	4.15 s	36.5 in (0.93 m)
All values from the 1994 NFL Combine

=== Los Angeles Rams ===
==== 1994 season ====
Bruce was selected in the 2nd round (33rd overall) by the Los Angeles Rams. He signed a 3-year, $1.75 million contract with the Rams on July 14, 1994. His first NFL reception was a 34-yard touchdown throw from Chris Miller at Atlanta on September 11, 1994. As a rookie, he finished with 21 receptions for 272 yards and three touchdowns. He earned the 1994 Carroll Rosenbloom Award, given to the team rookie of the year. He was also voted Rams Rookie of the Year by Orange County Sports Association and the Southern California Sports Broadcasters Association.

=== St. Louis Rams ===
==== 1995 season ====
Bruce moved with the team to St. Louis in 1995. In 1995, Bruce was named the NFC's week 1 Special Teams Player of the Week after blocking a punt that contributed to a Rams 17–14 win over the Green Bay Packers. He was the NFC Offensive Player of the Week for week 7 following a 10-catch, 191 yard, two-touchdown performance against the Atlanta Falcons in a 21–19 win. His total receiving yards for 1995 (119 catches for 1,781 yards) was second only to Jerry Rice's then record of 1,848 yards for one season, and is still the fifth most in a single season. In accomplishing this feat, Isaac Bruce surpassed former Houston Oilers WR Charley Hennigan's 34-year-old record of 1,746 set in 1961. Bruce's 119 catches also ranks 12th on the NFL's all-time single-season reception list. Bruce further broke four Rams' records, including most receiving yards, most receptions, most consecutive 100-yard receiving games (6) and most 100-yard games (9). Bruce made USA Today's All-Joe team, All-Madden, and All-Pro by Sports Illustrated and he was voted a first alternate to the Pro Bowl. He was also awarded the Rams MVP.

==== 1996 season ====
In 1996, Bruce led his team with 84 receptions and led the NFL with 1,338 yards. He became the first Rams receiver since Henry Ellard in 1990 and 1991 to post back-to-back 1,000-yard seasons. Against the Baltimore Ravens on October 27, 1996, he caught 11 passes for 229 yards and a touchdown. On November 30, 1996, Bruce was re-signed by the Rams to a 4-year $12.1 million contract extension. In 1996, he was voted to his first Pro Bowl, after having been an alternate the season before.

==== 1997 season ====
In 1997, Bruce missed the first six games due to injury. He finished the 1997 season with 56 recepitons for 815 yards and five touchdowns. In Atlanta on November 2, 1997, Bruce had another 200-yard game, totaling 10 catches, 233 yards and recording two touchdowns.

==== 1998 season ====
Prior to his injury in 1998 in a home game against the Minnesota Vikings, Bruce had 11 catches for 192 yards and an 80-yard touchdown. He appeared in five games in the 1998 season and had 32 receptions for 457 yards and one touchdown.

==== 1999 season ====
In 1999, Bruce was a second-team All-Pro and was voted to his second Pro Bowl. He caught 77 passes for 1,165 yards and 12 touchdowns as Rams had a 13–3 record and advanced to the Super Bowl. He also led Rams in receiving yards in the playoffs, with 317 yards on 13 catches with a team-high two touchdowns. Bruce caught Kurt Warner's 73-yard touchdown pass late in the fourth quarter of Super Bowl XXXIV to give the Rams a 23–16 lead, which turned out to be the game winner.

==== 2000 season ====
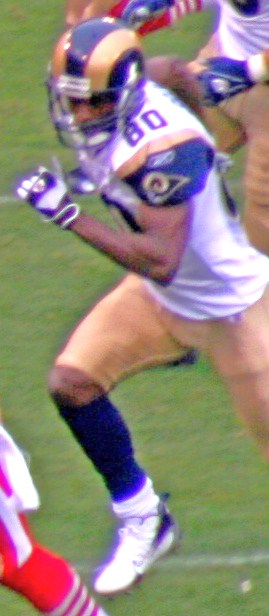
Bruce with the Rams in 2007.

Prior to the 2000 season, Bruce was re-signed by the Rams to a 7-year, $42 million contract extension. In 2000, Bruce was again a Pro Bowler and caught 87 passes for 1,471 yards and nine touchdowns. He became the first Rams receiver to earn back-to-back Pro Bowl invitations since Henry Ellard accomplished the feat for the 1988 and 1989 seasons. Bruce either led or was tied for the most receptions six times in 2000, led the team in receiving yards six times, and posted four 100-yard receiving games. That same year, Bruce and teammate Torry Holt became only the second WR duo from the same team to each gain over 1,400 yards in the same season (see Herman Moore and Brett Perriman).

==== 2001 season ====
In the 2001 season, Bruce totaled 64 receptions for 1,106 yards and six touchdowns. The Rams returned to the Super Bowl, losing to the New England Patriots, and Bruce made the Pro Bowl for the fourth time, becoming only the third receiver in franchise history to earn three consecutive Pro Bowl invitations (Elroy Hirsch 1951–53, Jim Phillips 1960–62). Bruce was voted offensive captain and became the franchise career leader in 100-yard receiving games (29), 1,000-yard seasons (5), and receiving touchdowns (56). He became just the second player in team history to post 500 career receptions vs. New York Giants on October 14, 2001. He caught five passes for 56 yards in a 20–17 loss to New England in Super Bowl XXXVI.

==== 2002 season ====
Bruce became the Rams' all-time leader in receptions in 2002 while posting his fourth consecutive 1,000-yard receiving season. That year, he led the team with seven touchdown receptions, and ended the season with 79 receptions for 1,075 yards. On his 30th birthday, Bruce had three fumbles in a game. Luckily for Bruce, he scored a game-winning touchdown and the game is almost forgotten because of 34–34 tie between the Falcons and Steelers the same day.

==== 2003 season ====
In 2003, Bruce missed the 1,000-yard mark for the first time since 1998, finishing with 69 catches for 981 yards and 5 touchdowns, however, he became the Rams' all-time leader in receiving yards (10,461), passing his position coach Henry Ellard (9,761). That year Bruce made seven receptions for 116 yards in the NFC Divisional Playoff Game double overtime loss to Carolina on January 10, 2004, making him the only Rams player to have four career 100-yard postseason performances, breaking a tie with Tom Fears.

==== 2004 season ====
In 2004, Bruce caught 89 passes (fifth in the NFC, eighth in the NFL) for 1,292 yards (fifth in the NFL). He started the season with four consecutive 100-yard receiving performances, the first player to accomplish this feat since Houston's Charley Hennigan in 1963. Bruce nabbed a team-high nine catches for 170 yards and one touchdown at Green Bay on November 29, 2004.

==== 2005 season ====
With the retirement of Jerry Rice, Bruce entered 2005 as the NFL's active leader in career receiving yards; a foot injury caused him to miss 5 games, and he was passed by Marvin Harrison by the end of the season. Still, he became the 14th player in NFL history with 800 career receptions on December 11 at Minnesota. He finished the 2005 season with 36 receptions for 525 yards and three touchdowns.

==== 2006 season ====
On March 7, 2006, the Rams released Bruce rather than pay him a $1.5 million bonus; however, five days after releasing him, the Rams agreed to a three-year, $15 million deal with Bruce. The re-signing freed a reported $7.5 million in cap money for the Rams. That season Bruce started 15 of 16 games and notched his eighth career 1,000-yard receiving season with 1,098 yards on 74 catches with three touchdowns.

==== 2007 season ====
In week 15 of the 2007 season, he retook the lead in career receiving yards among active players from Marvin Harrison, and in the same game passed James Lofton to become third on the all-time list. In the 2007 season, Bruce caught 55 passes for 733 yards and four touchdowns, second on his team only to Torry Holt in all three categories.

On February 28, 2008, Bruce was released by the Rams after refusing to take a pay cut, which the Rams promised they would not do in a previous contract renegotiation.

=== San Francisco 49ers ===
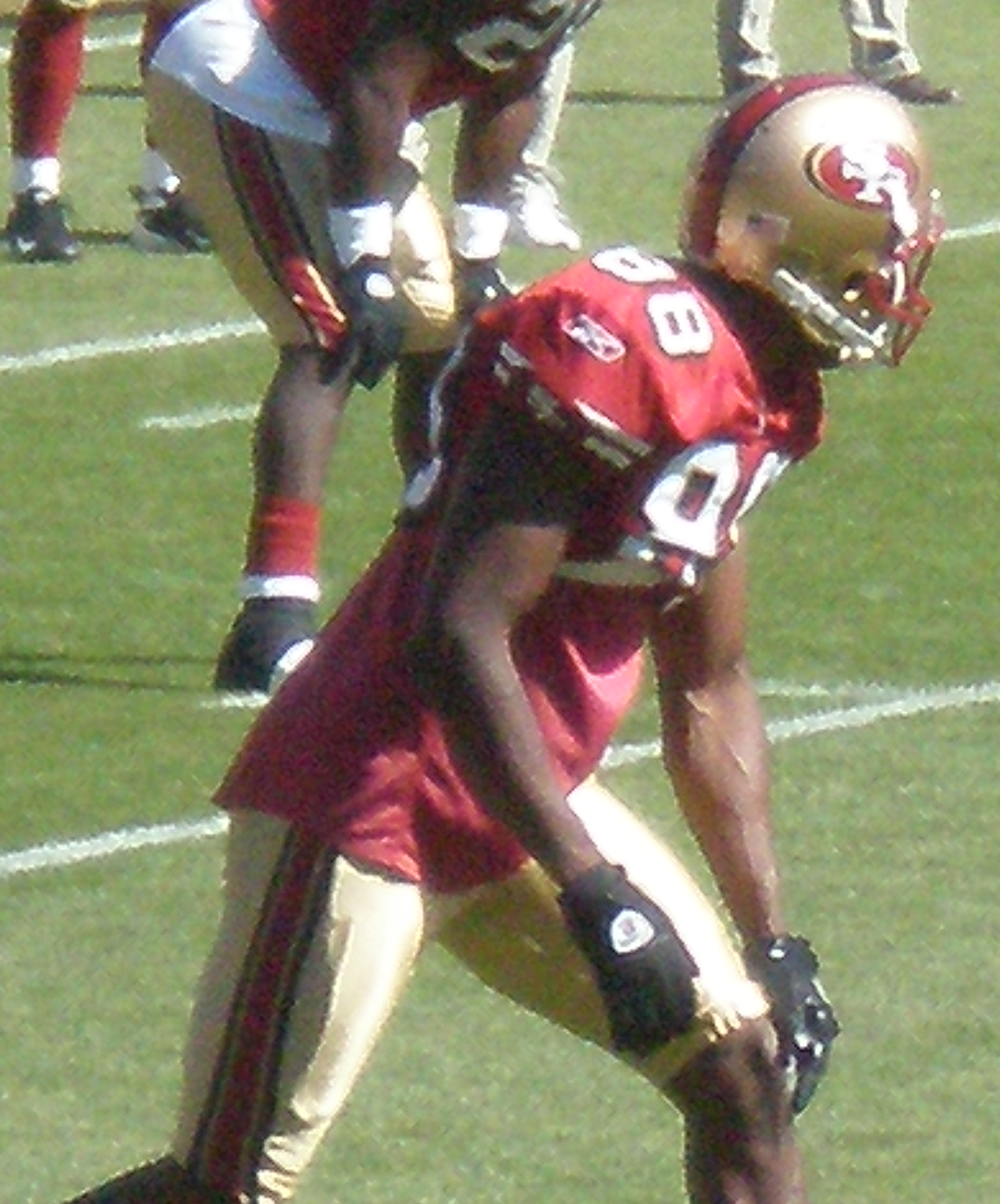
Bruce with the 49ers in October 2008.

On February 29, 2008, Bruce signed a two-year, $6 million contract with the San Francisco 49ers, to reunite with his former offensive coordinator Mike Martz. Jerry Rice gave Bruce permission to wear the number 80 although the team had already retired it, however Bruce decided against it and instead wore 88.

==== 2008 season ====
In Week 2 of the 2008 season, Bruce had four receptions for 153 yards in a 33–30 overtime road win against the Seattle Seahawks. In Week 12, on the road against the Dallas Cowboys, he had eight receptions for 125 yards and a touchdown. On December 21, 2008, in a Week 16 game at St. Louis against his former team, the Rams, Bruce caught his 1,000th career reception – a 3-yard touchdown catch. St. Louis fans cheered on their former wide receiver, yelling "Bruuuuuuuuce" whenever he caught a pass, and cheered when he caught his 1,000th pass. In the 2008 season, he had 61 receptions for 835 yards and seven touchdowns.

==== 2009 season ====
After contemplating retirement in the offseason, he elected to return to the 49ers in 2009 for his 16th season, reasoning that he was there to "get in the playoffs again and win a Super Bowl". He finished the 2009 season with 21 receptions for 264 yards in ten games. He was inactive for six of the final eight games. The 49ers went 8–8 and missed the postseason.

On June 7, 2010, Bruce was traded from the 49ers to the Rams so that he would be able to retire as a Ram. Bruce was the last member of the former first-tenure Los Angeles Rams to retire.

== Career statistics ==
=== NFL ===
Legend
	Won the Super Bowl
	Led the league
**Bold**	Career high

==== Regular season ====
Year	Team	Games		Receiving					Rushing					Passing							Fumbles	
Year	Team	GP	GS	Rec	Yds	Avg	Lng	TD	Att	Yds	Avg	Lng	TD	Cmp	Att	Pct	Yards	TD	Int	Rtg	Fum	Lost
1994	LAR	12	0	21	272	13.0	34	3	1	2	2.0	2	0	—	—	—	—	—	—	—	0	0
1995	STL	16	16	**119**	**1,781**	15.0	72	**13**	3	17	5.7	12	0	—	—	—	—	—	—	—	2	1
1996	STL	16	16	84	1,338	15.9	70	7	1	4	4.0	4	0	1	2	50.0	15	0	1	35.4	1	1
1997	STL	12	12	56	815	14.6	59	5	—	—	—	—	—	—	—	—	—		—	—	1	0
1998	STL	5	5	32	457	14.3	**80**	1	1	30	**30.0**	**30**	0	—	—	—	—	—	—	—	0	0
1999	STL	16	16	77	1,165	15.1	60	12	**5**	**32**	6.4	11	0	—	—	—	—	—	—	—	0	0
2000	STL	16	16	87	1,471	16.9	78	9	1	11	11.0	11	0	—	—	—	—	—	—	—	1	1
2001	STL	16	16	64	1,106	**17.3**	51	6	4	23	5.8	10	0	—	—	—	—	—	—	—	3	1
2002	STL	16	16	79	1,075	13.6	34	7	3	18	6.0	13	0	—	—	—	—	—	—	—	2	2
2003	STL	15	15	69	981	14.2	41	5	2	17	8.5	14	0	2	2	100.0	66	0	0	118.7	0	0
2004	STL	16	16	89	1,292	14.5	56	6	—	—	—	—	—	0	2	0.0	0	0	0	39.6	**5**	**4**
2005	STL	11	10	36	525	14.6	46	3	—	—	—	—	—	—	—	—	—	—	—	—	0	0
2006	STL	16	13	74	1,098	14.8	45	3	—	—	—	—	—	0	1	0.0	0	0	0	39.6	0	0
2007	STL	14	12	55	733	13.3	37	4	2	-4	-2.0	-1	0	—	—	—	—	—	—	—	0	0
2008	SF	16	15	61	835	13.7	63	7	1	-3	-3.0	-3	0	0	1	0.0	0	0	0	39.6	0	0
2009	SF	10	7	21	264	12.6	50	0	1	-8	-8.0	-8	0	—	—	—	—	—	—	—	0	0
Career		223	201	1,024	15,208	14.9	80	91	25	139	5.6	30	0	3	8	37.5	81	0	1	35.9	15	10

==== Postseason ====
Year	Team	Games		Receiving					Rushing				
Year	Team	GP	GS	Rec	Yds	Avg	Lng	TD	Att	Yds	Avg	Lng	TD
1999	STL	**3**	**3**	13	**317**	**24.4**	**77**	**2**	—	—	—	—	—
2000	STL	1	1	7	127	18.1	29	1	—	—	—	—	—
2001	STL	**3**	**3**	**14**	159	11.4	22	1	—	—	—	—	—
2003	STL	1	1	7	116	16.6	26	0	—	—	—	—	—
2004	STL	1	1	3	40	13.3	21	0	**1**	**1**	**1.0**	**1**	0
Career		9	9	44	759	17.3	77	4	1	1	1.0	1	0

=== College ===
Season	Team	GP	Receiving					Rushing				
Season	Team	GP	Rec	Yds	Avg	Lng	TD	Att	Yds	Avg	Lng	TD
1992	Memphis	11	39	532	13.6	66T	5	—	—	—	—	—
1993	Memphis	11	74	1,054	14.2	44T	10	2	-4	-2.0	7	0
Total		22	113	1,586	14.0	66T	15	2	-4	-2.0	7	0

== Awards and achievements ==
- 2020 - Elected to the Pro Football Hall of Fame.
- 2010 - His jersey No. 80 was retired by the Rams.
- 2009 – Second wide receiver in NFL history to achieve more than 15,000 receiving yards.
- 2008 – Reaches 1,000 receptions with a touchdown against his former team the St. Louis Rams. Surpassed Tim Brown to become 2nd all-time in receiving yards with 14,944 receiving yards.
- 2007 – Achieved 14,109 receiving yards and 942 receptions, putting him at 6th place for all-time receptions and 3rd for total yardage. He is also 13th all-time in receiving touchdowns with 84.
- 2006 – National Sportsmanship Award
- 2003 – Sports Personality of the Year Award from the Missouri Athletic Club at the annual Jack Buck Sports Award Banquet
- 2001 – Named to play in Pro Bowl (did not play – injured)
- 2000 – Named to play in Pro Bowl (did not play – injured)
- 1999 – Super Bowl XXXIV champion
- 1999 – Named to play in Pro Bowl
- 1998 – Rams Sprint Good Sport/Man of the Year
- 1997 – Rams True Value Man of the Year
- 1996 – Named to play in Pro Bowl, led league in receiving yards
- 1995 – Recorded 119 receptions (Most in NFL history by a player 25 and under, voted a Pro Bowl alternate)
- 1994 – Rams consensus Rookie of the Year

== Personal life ==
Bruce is a Christian. Bruce is nicknamed "The Reverend" because he wished to become one after he finished his football career; he also wanted to become a substitute teacher.

Bruce is married to Clegzette Bruce. They have two daughters.

Bruce is the elder cousin of Canadian Football League wide receiver Arland Bruce. Bruce is the younger cousin of NFL running back Derrick Moore.

Bruce is a member of the Omega Psi Phi fraternity.

=== Philanthropy ===
Since 1996, Isaac Bruce has provided tickets to home games to various schools and youth organizations, including partnering with Haz-Waste to provide jerseys and limousine rides for children. He was a United Way spokesman in 1996–97 and United Way African American Leadership Giver from 1997 to 1999. In 2008, he recorded a public service announcement and personal voice message for the RESPECT! Campaign against domestic violence.
