= Rosenbloom =

Rosenbloom may refer to:

== People ==
Rosenbloom is a surname. Notable people with this surname include:

- Benjamin L. Rosenbloom (1880–1965), American lawyer and politician
- Bert Rosenbloom, American economist and author
- Carroll Rosenbloom (1907–1979), American businessman
- Chip Rosenbloom (born 1964), American filmmaker and composer
- David Rosenbloom, American film and television editor
- David H. Rosenbloom (born 1943), American scholar
- Hannah Rosenbloom (born 2001), Laotian–American singer, model, actress
- Kate R. Rosenbloom, American molecular biologist and academic researcher
- Mark Rosenbloom, American medical doctor and author
- Maxie Rosenbloom (1906–1976), American professional boxer, actor, television personality
- Megan Rosenbloom (born 1981), American medical librarian, expert on anthropodermic bibliopegy
- Paul C. Rosenbloom (1920–2005), American mathematician
- Salomon Rosenbloom (1866–1952), American businessman and philanthropist
- Steve Rosenbloom (born 1944), American former football executive
- Susan Rosenbloom (1958–2015), British choreographer and artist

== Other uses ==
- Skipalong Rosenbloom, an American film
- "Cortège for Rosenbloom", a poem
- Rosenbloom v. Metromedia, 1971 Supreme Court case

== See also ==
- Rosenblum, a surname
