= St. Louis Rams =

Former National Football League franchise based in St. Louis, Missouri (1995–2015)

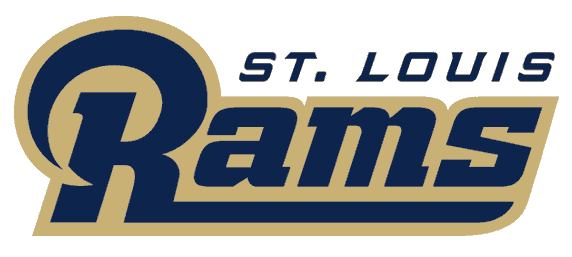
| Logo | Wordmark |
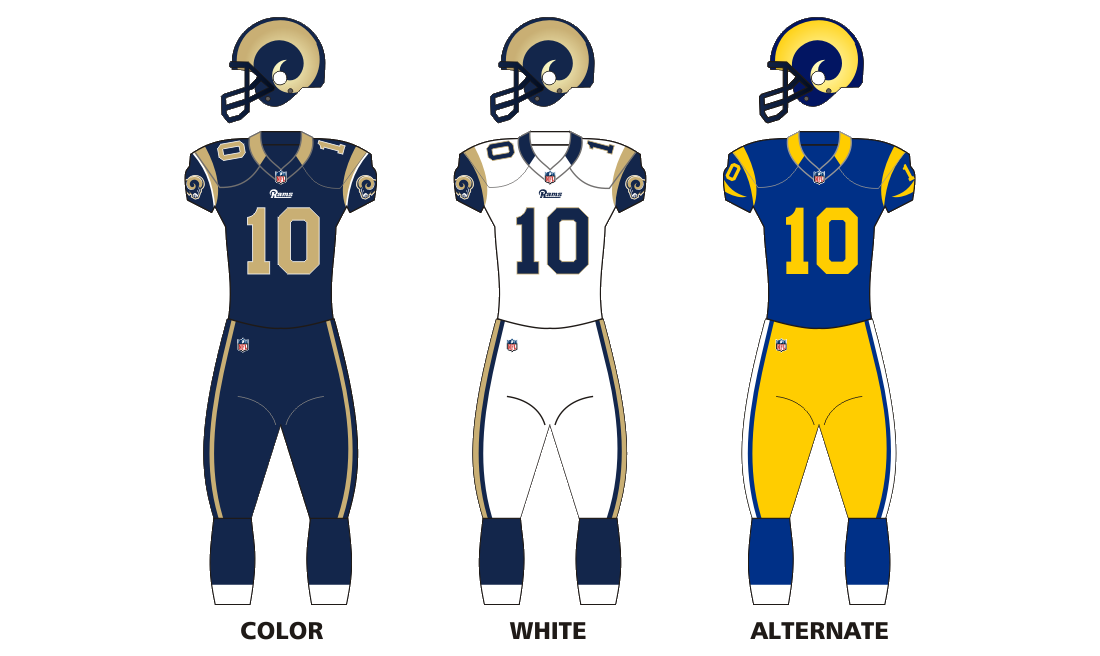
- Uniforms

General information
- Founded: 1995
- Folded: 2015
- Headquartered: St. Louis, Missouri
- Colors: Millennium blue, New Century gold, white
- Mascot: Ramster (1995); Rampage (2010–2015)
- Headquartered in Earth City, Missouri

Personnel
- Owners: Georgia Frontiere (1995–2008); Chip Rosenbloom (2008–2010); Lucia Rodriguez (2008–2010); Stan Kroenke (2010–2015)
- General manager: Steve Ortmayer (1995–1996); Dick Vermeil (1997–1999); Charley Armey (2000–2005); Jay Zygmunt (2006–2008); Billy Devaney (2009–2011); Les Snead (2012–2015)
- Head coach: Rich Brooks (1995–1996); Dick Vermeil (1997–1999); Mike Martz (2000–2005); Joe Vitt (2005); Scott Linehan (2006–2008); Jim Haslett (2008); Steve Spagnuolo (2009–2011); Jeff Fisher (2012–2015)

Nickname
- The Greatest Show on Turf (1999–2001)

Team history
- Cleveland Rams (1936–1942, 1944–1945); Suspended operations (1943); Los Angeles Rams (1946–1994, 2016–present); St. Louis Rams (1995–2015)

Home fields
- Busch Memorial Stadium (1995); The Dome at America's Center (1995–2015)

League / conference affiliations
- National Football League (1995–2015): National Football Conference (1995–2015); NFC West (1995–2015)

Championships
- Super Bowl championships: 1 1999 (XXXIV)
- Conference championships: 2: NFC: 1999, 2001
- Division championships: 3: NFC West: 1999, 2001, 2003

Playoff appearances (5)
- NFL: 1999, 2000, 2001, 2003, 2004

The St. Louis Rams were a professional American football team of the National Football League (NFL). They played in St. Louis, Missouri, from 1995 through the 2015 season, before moving back to Los Angeles, California, where the team had played from 1946 to 1994. The team is now known as the Los Angeles Rams once again.

The arrival of the Rams, which originated in Cleveland before moving to Los Angeles in 1946, gave St. Louis a professional football team for the first time since the St. Louis Cardinals left to become the Arizona Cardinals in 1987.

The St. Louis Rams played their home games at what is now known as The Dome at America's Center in downtown St. Louis, which the city had been building for a few years in the hopes of gaining an NFL team. Dubbed the Trans World Dome, the stadium was unready when the team arrived, so it temporarily shared Busch Memorial Stadium with the St. Louis Cardinals of Major League Baseball (MLB). The Rams played their first game in St. Louis on September 10, 1995, defeating the New Orleans Saints, 17–13. The Trans World Dome opened on November 12, 1995, when the Rams defeated the Carolina Panthers 28–17.

The franchise notched its first winning season and playoff appearance as a St. Louis, Missouri team in 1999, and went on to win its first and only championship in Super Bowl XXXIV. That season began a three-year run of success with The Greatest Show on Turf offense, which included a franchise-best 14–2 record in 2001 en route to a Super Bowl XXXVI appearance.

Following their 2002 Super Bowl defeat to the New England Patriots, the Rams struggled for their remaining years in St. Louis. By the time they moved back to Los Angeles, the Rams had gone 12 seasons without a winning record, and 11 seasons without qualifying for the postseason.

The St. Louis Rams played their last game in St. Louis, Missouri on December 17, 2015, defeating the Tampa Bay Buccaneers 31–23 in a home stadium that had been renamed the Edward Jones Dome. Their last game as a St. Louis–based franchise was on January 3, 2016, against the San Francisco 49ers at Levi's Stadium, which they lost 19–16. After the 2015 NFL season, the team returned to Los Angeles.

== Early days ==
=== 1936: Founding in the AFL ===
The Rams franchise, founded in 1936 by attorney/businessman Homer Marshman and player-coach Damon "Buzz" Wetzel, was named for the then-powerhouse Fordham Rams and because the name was short and would fit easily into a newspaper headline.

Coached by Wetzel, and featuring future Hall-of-Fame coach Sid Gillman as a receiver, the team went 5–2–2 in its first season, finishing in second place, behind the Boston Shamrocks. The team might have hosted an AFL championship game at Cleveland's League Park; however, the Boston team canceled because its unpaid players refused to participate. The Rams then moved from the poorly managed AFL to the National Football League on February 12, 1937. Marshman and the other Rams stockholders paid $10,000 for an NFL franchise, then put up $55,000 to capitalize the new club, and Wetzel became general manager.

=== 1937–1943: Struggles ===
Under head coach Hugo Bezdek and with sole star Johnny Drake, the team's first-round draft pick, the Rams struggled in an era of little league parity to a 1–10 record in 1937 under heavy competition from the NFL's "big four": the Chicago Bears, Green Bay Packers, New York Giants, and the Washington Redskins. After the team dropped its first three games of 1938, Wetzel was fired, then Bezdek. Art Lewis became coach, and guided the team to four victories in its last eight games and a 4–7 record.

Future Hall-of-Famer Dutch Clark was named head coach for the 1939 season, and with Lewis as his assistant and with star back Parker Hall on the squad, the Rams improved to 5–5–1 in 1939 and 4–6–1 in 1940 before falling back to 2–9 in 1941, the year that Dan Reeves, a New Yorker with family wealth in the grocery business, acquired the team.

The Rams bounced back to 5–6 and a third-place finish in 1942, but in the heavy war year of 1943, when many NFL personnel, including Rams' majority owner Reeves, had been drafted into the military, they suspended play for one season.

=== 1944: Rebound ===
The franchise began to rebound in 1944 under the direction of general manager Chile Walsh and head coach Aldo Donelli, the only man both to participate in a FIFA World Cup game and coach an NFL team. With servicemen beginning to return home, and with the makings of a championship team that included ends Jim Benton and Steve Pritko, backs Jim Gillette and Tommy Colella, and linemen Riley Matheson and Mike Scarry, the team improved to 4–6 in 1944, defeating the Bears in League Park and the Detroit Lions in Briggs Stadium.

==== The move to Anaheim ====
Before the Rams’ 1979 Super Bowl season, the team's owner Carroll Rosenbloom drowned in an accident. His widow, Georgia Frontiere, inherited 70% ownership of the team. Frontiere fired her stepson, Steve Rosenbloom, and assumed total control of the franchise. As had been planned before Carroll Rosenbloom's death, the Rams moved from their longtime home at the Los Angeles Memorial Coliseum to Anaheim Stadium in nearby Orange County in 1980. The move was necessitated in part because the Coliseum's abnormally large seating capacity of 100,000 was difficult to sell out, which often subjected the team to the league's local-market TV blackout rule. At the same time, Southern California's population patterns were changing; there was rapid growth in L.A.’s affluent suburbs (e.g. greater Orange County) and a decline in the city of Los Angeles's population and income. Anaheim Stadium was originally built in 1966 as the home of the California Angels Major League Baseball franchise. To accommodate the Rams’ move, the ballpark was reconfigured with luxury suites and enclosed to accommodate crowds of about 65,000 for football.

From 1982, the Coliseum was also occupied by the Los Angeles Raiders. The combined effect of these two factors split the loyalties of the Rams’ traditional fan base between two teams. Making matters even worse, the Rams were unsuccessful on the field, while the Raiders were thriving, winning Super Bowl XVIII in 1983. The Los Angeles Lakers won the NBA Finals in 1980, their first of five titles in that decade; the Los Angeles Dodgers won the World Series in 1981 and 1988; and the Los Angeles Kings, buoyed by the acquisition of Wayne Gretzky in August 1988, advanced to the 1993 Stanley Cup Final.

=== 1990–1994: Frontiere's endgame for the L.A. Rams ===
Although it was not apparent at the time, the Rams’ loss in the 1989 NFC Championship Game marked the end of an era. The Rams did not have another winning season in Los Angeles before their relocation. The first half of the 1990s featured four straight 10-loss (or worse) seasons, no playoff appearances and waning fan interest. The return of Chuck Knox as head coach after successful stints as head coach of the Buffalo Bills and the Seattle Seahawks did not boost the Rams’ fortunes. Knox's run-oriented offense brought about the end of offensive coordinator Ernie Zampese's tenure in 1993. General manager John Shaw was perceived by some to continually squander NFL draft picks on sub-standard talent. The offensive scheme was dull by 1990s standards, further alienating fans. One bright spot for the offense during this time was running back Jerome Bettis, a bruising running back from Notre Dame. Bettis flourished in Knox's offense, running for 1,429 yards as a rookie and 1,025 in his sophomore effort.

As early as the close of the 1992 season, Georgia Frontiere announced she wanted to break the Rams’ lease at Anaheim Stadium. After the 1993 season, Frontiere attempted to move the Rams to Baltimore, but her fellow owners turned that proposal down. Frontiere then sought to relocate the team to St. Louis, but was voted down again, with 21 opposed, three in favor (the Rams, Cincinnati Bengals and Tampa Bay Buccaneers), and six abstaining. The other owners (led by Buffalo's Ralph Wilson, the Jets’ Leon Hess, the Giants’ Wellington Mara, Washington's Jack Kent Cooke, Arizona's Bill Bidwill and Minnesota's John Skoglund) believed that the Rams’ financial problems were caused by the Frontieres’ mismanagement. When Frontiere threatened to sue the league, commissioner Paul Tagliabue acquiesced to Frontiere's demands. As part of the relocation deal, the city of St. Louis agreed to build a taxpayer-financed stadium, the Trans World Dome, and guaranteed that the stadium's amenities would be maintained in the top 25% of all NFL stadiums. Frontiere waived the clause after a 10-year threshold period passed, as the city implemented a later plan to improve the stadium.

The move left many in the Los Angeles area embittered toward the NFL. That sentiment was best expressed by actor and ex-Ram Fred Dryer, who at the time said “I hate these people [the organization and its owner] for what they did, taking the Rams logo with them when they moved to St. Louis. That logo belonged to Southern California.” Steve Rosenbloom, general manager of the team during his father's tenure as owner, opined that teams come and go, but for a team to leave Los Angeles — the second largest city in America — for St. Louis (approximately the 18th-largest) was simply irresponsible and foolish, despite the notoriously fickle support of Los Angeles fans. With the Raiders moving from L.A. back to Oakland only a few months later, the NFL would have no franchise in Los Angeles for two decades, with the Coliseum used for professional football only in 2001, by the Los Angeles Xtreme of the now-defunct XFL.

== First years (1995–1998) ==
While the Rams dealt with stadium concerns in Los Angeles, efforts were under way to regain an NFL franchise in St. Louis to play in a new domed stadium slated to open in 1995. First, Anheuser-Busch scion Jim Orthwein tried, and failed, to move the New England Patriots to St. Louis. Then, despite being heavily favored along with Charlotte to win an expansion team, St. Louis lost to a group from Jacksonville, Florida. So certain, in fact, did it appear that St. Louis would gain an expansion franchise, that the team had a name selected – the Stallions – and T-shirts with the team's logo were made very briefly available for sale at a number of area sports shops.

Just before moving to St. Louis, the Rams fired Knox and hired Rich Brooks, longtime successful coach at the University of Oregon, to replace him. The team played its first several games in St. Louis at Busch Stadium, the home of the NFL's St. Louis Cardinals from 1966 until 1987, as work finished on their new home, the Trans World Dome. Brooks jettisoned Knox's run-oriented scheme in favor of a powerful air attack. Bettis all but disappeared from the offense, rushing for only 637 yards. Despite this, the Rams started off well, getting off to a 5–1 start, until a 44–10 loss to the 49ers in the last game at Busch Stadium sent the team into a downward spiral, and they finished 7–9 — still the franchise's closest to contention since 1989. Perhaps the most memorable aspect was that veteran offensive lineman and future Hall of Famer Jackie Slater played his 20th and final season with the team in its new St. Louis location.

=== Vermeil era ===
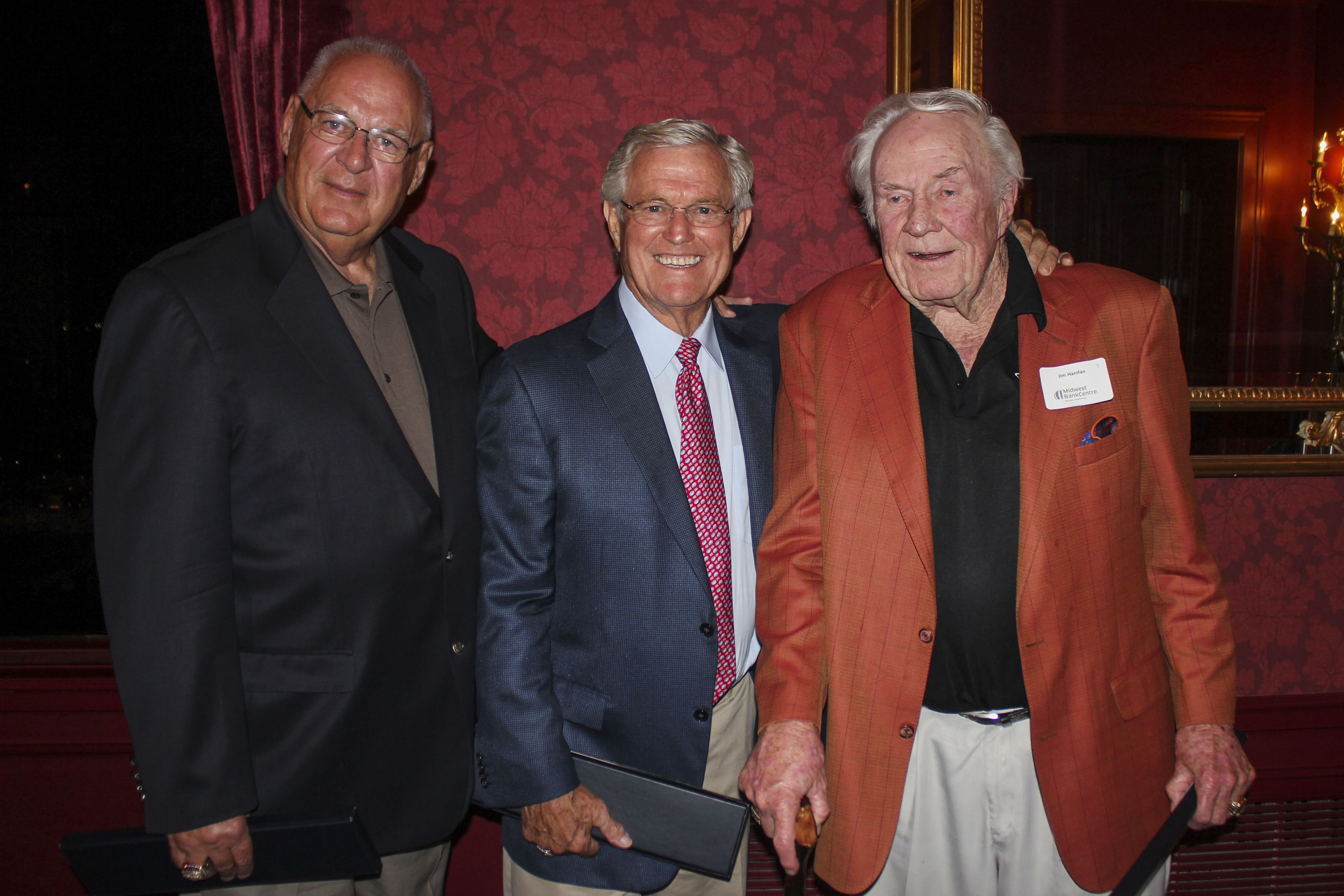
Rams Architects, (left) Charley Armey, (center) Dick Vermeil, (right) Jim Hanifan.

The next three seasons were largely a repeat of the Rams’ final five seasons in Los Angeles. The team drafted highly touted Nebraska running back Lawrence Phillips with the sixth overall pick in the 1996 NFL draft. Now expendable, Bettis was traded to the Pittsburgh Steelers in exchange for draft picks, a move now seen as one of the most lopsided trades in professional sports history, strongly favoring the Steelers. After regressing to 6–10 in 1996, Brooks was replaced by Dick Vermeil. Vermeil had enjoyed success as the head coach of UCLA, where he won a Rose Bowl, and the Philadelphia Eagles, who he led to Super Bowl XV. However, he had left the Eagles after an unsuccessful 1982 season, claiming burnout, and spent much of the next decade and a half as a college football commentator for ABC Sports.

Vermeil's first two seasons as Rams coach were as unsuccessful as many of the preceding seasons. Phillips was cut from the team mid-season in 1997 after showing up for a game with alcohol on his breath, cementing his status as a draft bust.

At the close of the 1998 season, the franchise's combined record over nine seasons was 45–99, the worst in the NFL for the period and rivalled by only the Cincinnati Bengals, who went 49–97 over the same span.

== 1999–2001: The Greatest Show on Turf ==
=== 1999: Super Bowl champions ===
Finally, in 1999, there appeared to be reason for hope. The Rams obtained running back Marshall Faulk from Indianapolis in a trade. The Rams also signed former-Redskin quarterback Trent Green as a free agent in February 1999 to a 4-year $17.5 million contract that included a $4.5 million signing bonus. Additionally, the Rams drafted wide receiver Torry Holt with the sixth overall pick in the 1999 NFL draft.

However, in a preseason game against the San Diego Chargers, Green blew out his anterior cruciate ligament and missed the entire season, prompting Green's backup, a 28-year-old former Arena Football League Iowa Barnstormers and NFL Europe Amsterdam Admirals player named Kurt Warner, to enter the game. During postgame press conferences, a tearful Vermeil vowed that the Rams would "rally around" Warner and “play good football” with him. Most observers believed Green's injury set up the Rams for another long season of failure; in fact, ESPN Magazine predicted that the Rams would finish with the worst record in the league (even below that of the recently reactivated Cleveland Browns).

However, Warner would have one of the most explosive starts to a career in football history, throwing for over 4,000 yards and 41 touchdowns. His quarterback rating of 109.2 was the highest in the NFL that year. He proved to be the catalyst that sparked an explosive offense nicknamed “The Greatest Show on Turf”, which would lead the NFL in points. Warner captured the NFL MVP award at season's end, while the 1999 NFL Offensive Player of the Year Award went to Faulk.

The Rams were also noted for a colorful celebration conducted by their offensive players in the end zone after scoring a touchdown. The celebration, which involved a group of players standing in a circle and swaying their arms as a football spun like a top in the center of the circle, was known as the “Bob 'N Weave.” This type of “premeditated and prolonged” display was shortly thereafter subject to “excessive celebration” penalties installed by the league.

After finishing the 1999 season 13–3 (the franchise's second-best regular season record to date), the Rams started out the playoffs by defeating the Minnesota Vikings 49–37 to achieve their first NFC championship game since 1989. Their opponent was the Tampa Bay Buccaneers, who proved successful in shutting down the Rams’ vaunted offense. Still, the Rams managed to win the game 11–6, with the one touchdown coming on Warner's 30-yard touchdown pass to Ricky Proehl, who made a one-handed catch. Proehl, a 10-year NFL veteran who was in the playoffs for the first time in his NFL career, said after the game “There are a lot of people who say there are 500 Ricky Proehls out there. I beg to differ.”

The Rams’ opponent in Super Bowl XXXIV was the Tennessee Titans, who, like the Rams, had recently relocated cities. In a game that many consider the best Super Bowl ever, Tennessee played the Rams tough throughout, achieving a 16–16 tie with 2:12 left on an Al Del Greco field goal. On the next drive, Warner, who had been a clutch performer all season long, came through once again, connecting with Isaac Bruce for a 73-yard touchdown pass on the first play of the drive to give the Rams a 23–16 lead with 1:53 to play.

Tennessee then mounted a desperate, last-minute drive, reaching the St. Louis 10-yard line with six seconds left and no timeouts. Titans quarterback Steve McNair threw to Kevin Dyson on a slant. Dyson caught the pass at the 3-yard line but was stopped in a play known as “The Tackle”; Rams linebacker Mike Jones brought Dyson down just 18 inches, or half a yard, shy of the goal line, ending the game and giving the Rams and coach Dick Vermeil their first Super Bowl victory. Warner was named Super Bowl MVP.

Following the Rams’ Super Bowl victory, Vermeil retired from football (though he came back in 2001 as head coach of the Kansas City Chiefs) and was replaced by offensive coordinator (and apprentice) Mike Martz.

=== 2000: Wild card loss ===
In Mike Martz’ first year as Rams head coach, the defending-champion Rams started the season by winning their first six games as they went 7–1 in the first half of the season. However, their season started getting ugly. They went 3–5 during the last half of the season, including a three-game losing streak. They still managed to get into the playoffs with a 10–6 record and the NFC's #6 seed, and faced the NFC West champion New Orleans Saints, the #3 seed, in the Wild Card round. Playing at the Louisiana Superdome, the Rams’ 24th-ranked defense yielded New Orleans a 31–7 lead, but the Rams fought back, scoring three straight touchdowns. However, the comeback fell short as the Saints triumphed 31–28, the first playoff win in New Orleans franchise history.

=== 2001: Third Super Bowl and loss to the Patriots ===
In 2001, the “Max Q” Rams went 14–2 (8–0 on the road), led not only by a strong offense (their third straight year of scoring 500 or more points), but a good defense as well, coached by Lovie Smith and led by Adam Archuleta. After handling the Green Bay Packers in the divisional playoffs, the Rams fought off the Philadelphia Eagles in the NFC Championship Game 29–24 to reach their second Super Bowl in three seasons. Their opponents in Super Bowl XXXVI would be the New England Patriots who, much as the Rams had had two years previous, had enjoyed a Cinderella playoff run, highlighted by a dramatic and controversial 16–13 divisional playoff win against the Oakland Raiders.

The talent-laden Rams appeared to be primed to become the first professional football dynasty of the 21st century. It was however, the Patriots who began their dynasty that night. They went on to win three Super Bowls in a four-year span, and have played in nine since the 2001 season as of 2020. Despite being a 14-point favorite, the Rams were dominated by the Patriots for most of the game. The Patriots chipped the Rams wideouts and running backs, disrupting their precision passing patterns. They also beat up Kurt Warner, forcing him into uncharacteristic mistakes, including a 47-yard touchdown interception return by Ty Law.

In the fourth quarter, the Rams mounted a comeback attempt. Two plays after an apparent game-clinching 95-yard fumble return by the Patriots was reversed on a penalty, Kurt Warner scored on a two-yard keeper to bring the Rams to within seven points, 17–10. After holding the Patriots on the next drive, the Rams were in much the same situation as they had been against Tennessee. Warner came through once again, quickly leading the Rams on a dramatic drive culminating in a 26-yard touchdown pass to Ricky Proehl. The extra point by Jeff Wilkins tied the game at 17 with 90 seconds left.

With the Patriots holding no timeouts and the Rams having seized the momentum, overtime seemed assured. Fox Sports commentator John Madden opined that the Patriots should run out the clock to end regulation time. Nevertheless, quarterback Tom Brady led the Patriots down the field, completing all but one pass (an intentional spike to stop the clock) before Adam Vinatieri's last-second 48-yard field goal defeated the Rams 20–17.

Super Bowl XXXVI later became part of the wider 2007 National Football League videotaping controversy, also known as “Spygate". The Boston Herald reported, citing an unnamed source, that the Patriots had taped the Rams’ walkthrough practice prior to the game. After further investigation, the league determined that no tape of the Rams’ Super Bowl walkthrough was made, and the Herald later issued an apology in 2008 for the article.

== 2002–2004: Struggles ==
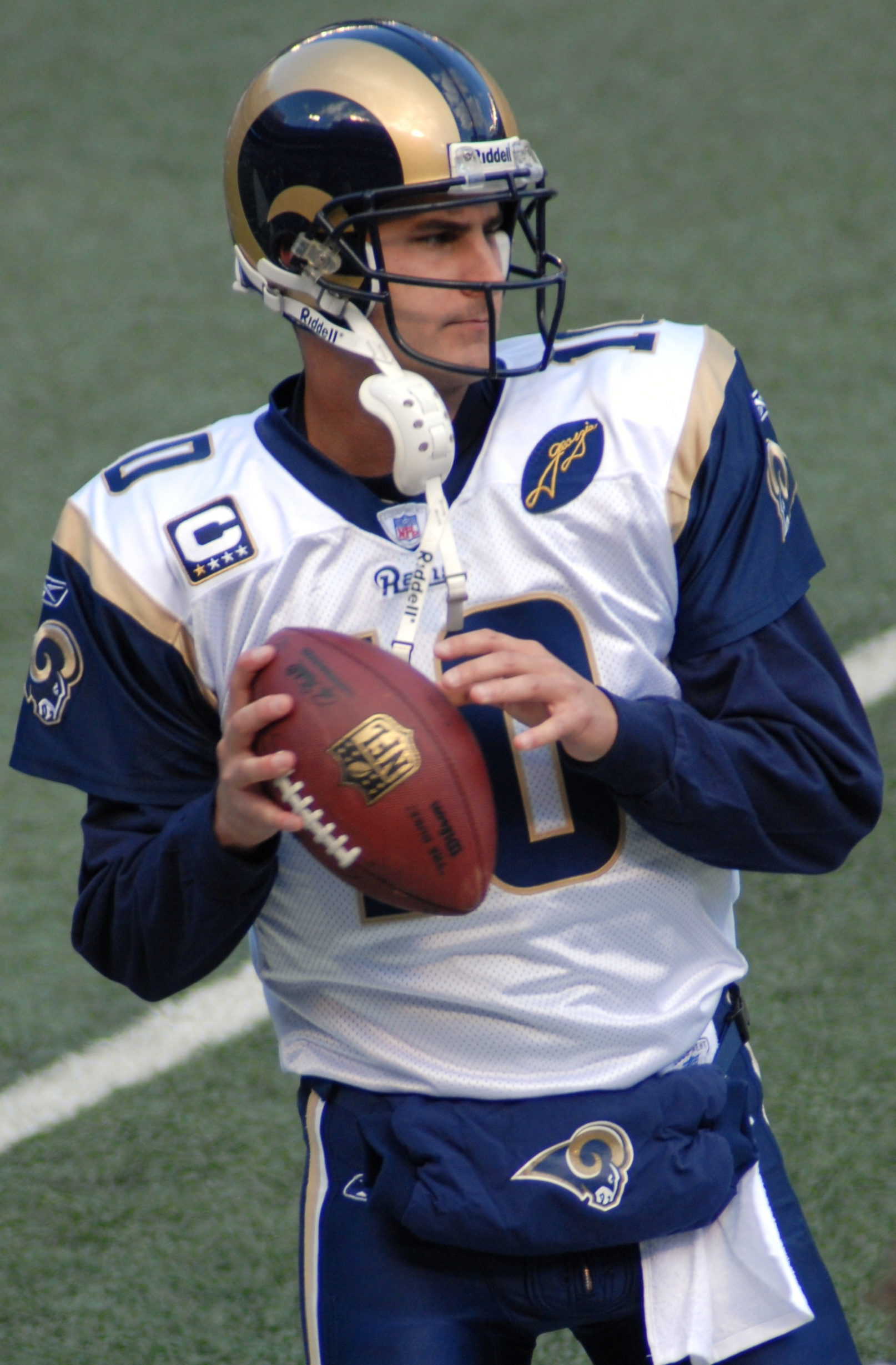
Marc Bulger spent several seasons as the Rams quarterback.

In 2002, the Rams had a very disappointing 7–9 final record (after starting out 0–5). The silver lining was the emergence of young quarterback Marc Bulger, from West Virginia University, who, after Kurt Warner was injured, won every game in which he both started and finished. Bulger's emergence was a highlight of the Rams’ 2002 NFL season, demonstrating Martz's knack for developing lightly regarded or overlooked players into top-quality, productive quarterbacks. The Rams also gained two new divisional rivals in the NFC West thanks to a league-wide realignment that created eight new divisions of four teams each. One of these new rivals, the Arizona Cardinals, played in St. Louis from 1960 until the end of the 1987 season, and the other, the Seattle Seahawks, returned to the NFC for the first time since their inaugural 1976 season.

In 2003, Warner lost the starting job to Bulger after suffering six fumbles in the season opener against the New York Giants. Warner was released by the Rams in June 2004 and quickly signed a free agent contract with the Giants, effectively ending the “Greatest Show on Turf” era.

The 2003 season saw the Rams go 12–4, winning the NFC West again. However, the Rams were defeated in the divisional round by the Carolina Panthers (29–23 in double overtime), who went on to become NFC champions.

During the 2004 NFL draft, the Rams used their first pick (24th overall) to select running back Steven Jackson from Oregon State.

The Rams began their 10th year in St. Louis at home, winning their home opener over the Arizona Cardinals 17–10. They then lost the next two games: to the eventual NFC South champion Atlanta Falcons 34–17, and to the New Orleans Saints at home 28–25 in overtime. The Rams got to 2–2 start on the season with a 24–14 road victory over the San Francisco 49ers. In Week 5, they defeated the Seattle Seahawks 33–27 on the road, as Bulger connected with Shaun McDonald for the 52-yard winning score in overtime. Next came a home win over Tampa Bay, 28–21 before a road loss to the hapless Miami Dolphins, 31–14. Following a Week 8 bye, the Rams lost to the defending champion Patriots at home 40–22. The Rams then downed the Seahawks 23–12 but then lost their next games on the road, losing to the Buffalo Bills 37–17 and to the eventual NFC North champion Green Bay Packers 45–17. The team rebounded with a 16–6 home win over the 49ers, but their playoff hopes continued to shrink with two more road losses, falling to the Carolina Panthers 20–7 and to the Cardinals 31–7. At 6–8, the Rams rallied for home wins against the Philadelphia Eagles (20–7) and the New York Jets (32–29 in overtime), snatching the NFC's #5 seed despite finishing with an 8–8 record.

For the Wild Card round, the Rams faced the Seahawks for the third time. The visiting Rams took the lead on a 17-yard Bulger touchdown pass to Cam Cleeland with just 2:11 left in regulation time and then held off the Seahawks on 4th and goal to earn a 27–20 victory. The Rams made NFL history by becoming the first team to go .500 (8–8) in the regular season and then win a playoff game. However, St. Louis was thrashed in the divisional round by the Atlanta Falcons 47–17.

== 2005–2015: Playoff drought ==
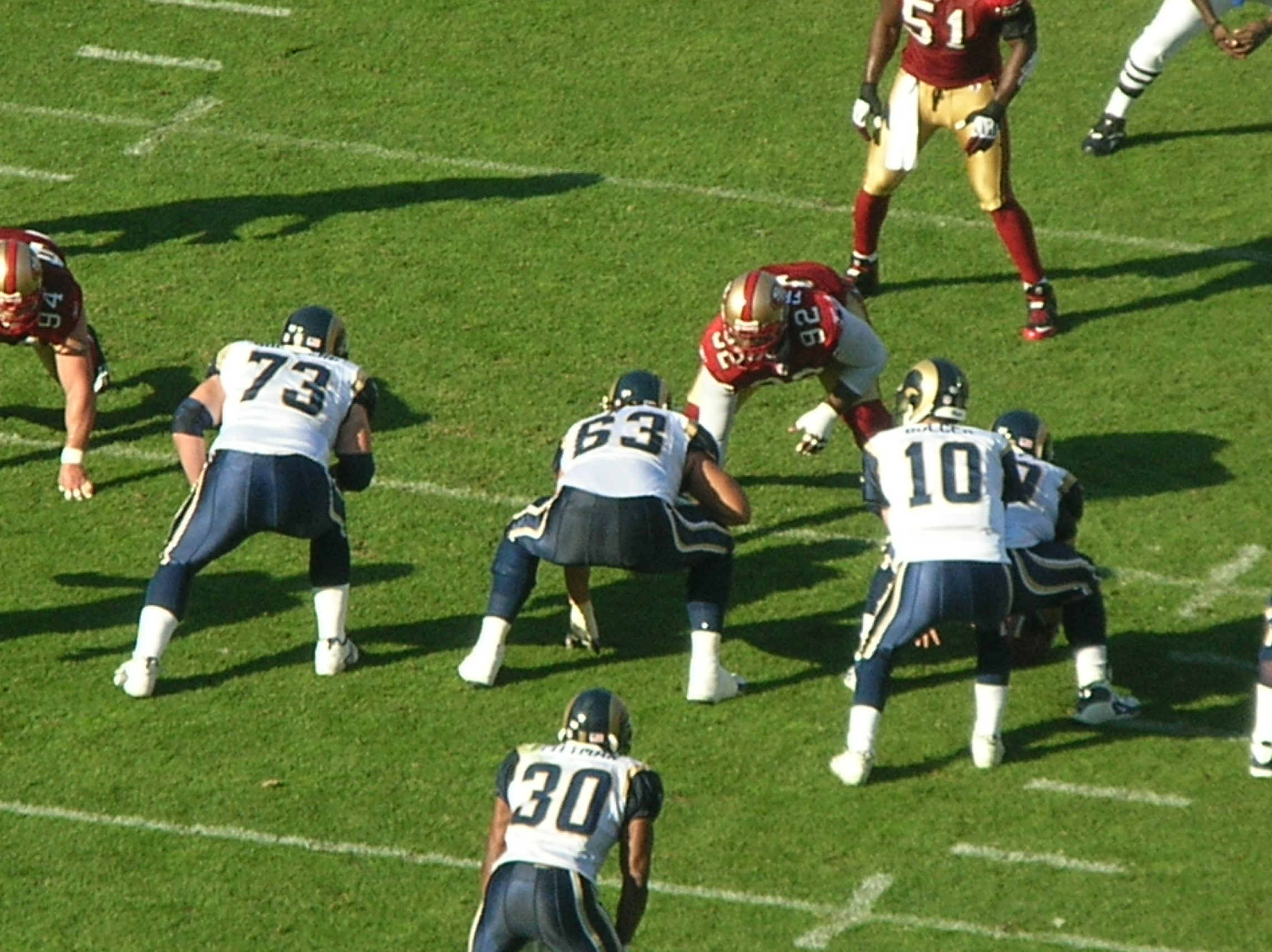
The St. Louis Rams on offense during an away game against the San Francisco 49ers

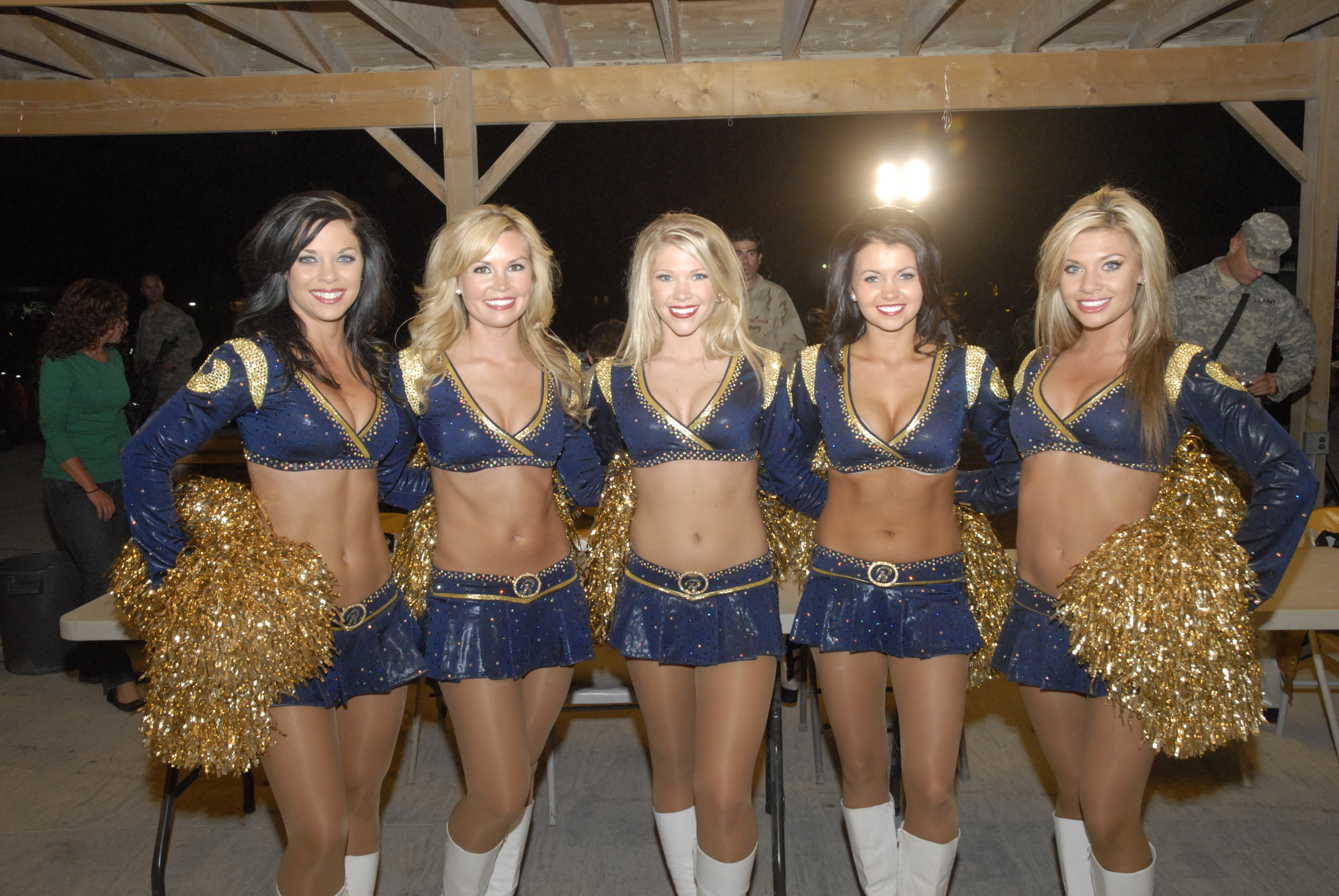
St. Louis Rams' cheerleaders visiting the Kandahar Airfield, Afghanistan, September 15, 2009.

During the 2005 NFL draft, the Rams used their first pick on offensive tackle Alex Barron from Florida State. The Rams started the 2005 season by losing on the road in Week 1 to the San Francisco 49ers, 28–25, but rebounded with a 17–12 road win over the Arizona Cardinals and former Rams quarterback Kurt Warner. The Rams won their Week 3 home opener against the Tennessee Titans 31–27 before dropping three straight games. In Week 5, Martz was diagnosed with an infection in his heart, and Joe Vitt was named interim head coach. In Vitt's first game at the helm, Bulger sprained an AC joint in a loss to the Indianapolis Colts. Replacement quarterback Jamie Martin then led the team to home victories against the New Orleans Saints (28–17) and Jacksonville Jaguars (24–21). After a Week 9 bye, Bulger returned but the Rams fell to the Seattle Seahawks 31–16. The Rams next lost a rematch to the Cardinals, with Bulger suffering another shoulder injury. Against the Houston Texans, Martin was knocked out of the game with a concussion, giving rookie Ryan Fitzpatrick his first playing time in the NFL. Fitzpatrick would become a long-time journeyman playing for teams like the Bills, Jets, Buccaneers, and Dolphins. The Rams won 33–27 in overtime on a 56-yard touchdown strike from Fitzpatrick to receiver Kevin Curtis. However, they lost their next four games. Martin and the Rams managed to end their disastrous season on a positive note, beating the Dallas Cowboys on the road in ESPN's final Sunday night game. Martz was fired at season's end.

Despite having a talent-laden roster, the Rams’ front-office dysfunction had traveled from California to Missouri. With team president John Shaw remaining in Los Angeles after the relocation, president of football operations Jay Zygmunt clashed with head coach Martz, including an incident in which Zygmunt prevented the ill Martz from phoning in a play to his offensive coordinator. Poor draft choices and mediocre records began to pile up for the once-budding dynasty as the post-Martz era found the Rams in chaos. Hoping to regain control within the franchise, the Rams hired former Dolphins offensive coordinator Scott Linehan as head coach on January 19, 2006. On January 24, Jim Haslett, the former head coach of the Saints, signed a three-year deal as defensive coordinator.

Following the 2007 season, Georgia Frontiere died on January 18, 2008, after having owned the team for 28 years. Ownership of the team passed to her son Dale “Chip” Rosenbloom and daughter Lucia Rodriguez. Rosenbloom was named the new Rams majority owner. Linehan was fired on September 29, 2008, after the team started the 0–4, and Haslett took over as interim head coach for the rest of the season. In late December, Shaw and Zygmunt both resigned and Billy Devaney was promoted to general manager.

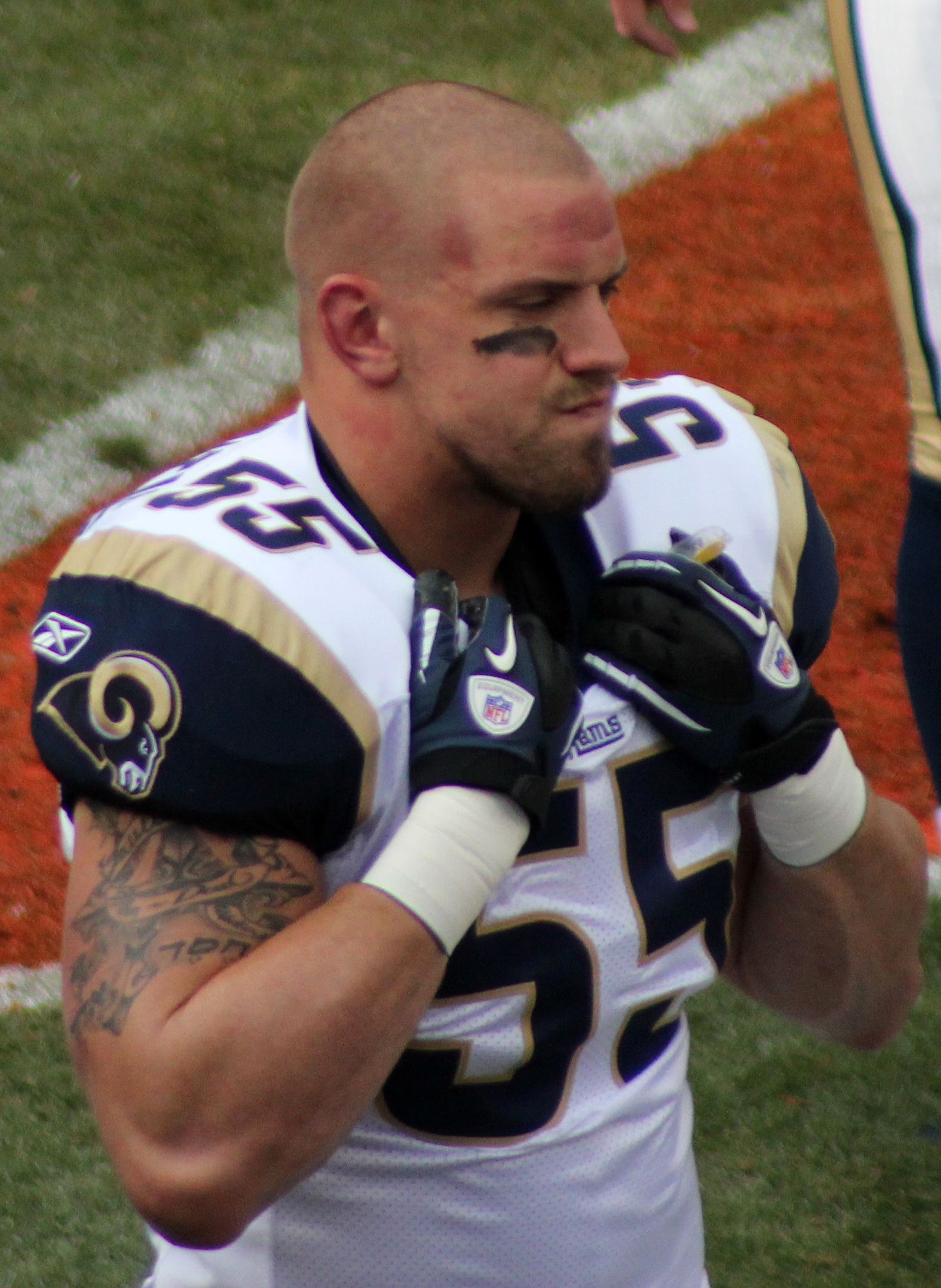
Middle linebacker James Laurinaitis

Steve Spagnuolo was named head coach in January 2009. Spagnuolo had masterminded the Giants’ defensive scheme that shut down the previously undefeated New England Patriots in Super Bowl XLII. As the 2009 season began, conservative talk show host Rush Limbaugh put in an offer to buy the Rams, but his controversial televised comments about Eagles quarterback Donovan McNabb in 2003 led the league to force Limbaugh to drop his plans. Despite his success with the Giants, Spagnuolo's first season as Rams head coach saw the team go 1–15, beginning with a shutout at the hands of the Seahawks. The team's lone victory came in Week 8 over the 2–14 Detroit Lions. However, Spagnuolo was not fired after this season, and from 2007 to 2009, the Rams lost 42 of 48 games.

=== 2010: Stan Kroenke takes over ===
On May 31, 2009, the St. Louis Post-Dispatch reported that majority owners Rosenbloom and Rodriguez officially offered their majority share of Rams for sale. They retained the services of Goldman Sachs, a prominent investment banking firm, to help facilitate the sale of the Rams by evaluating bids and soliciting potential buyers. The sale price was unknown, but at the time Forbes estimated the team's value at $929 million. On the final day to do so, then-minority owner Stan Kroenke invoked his right of first refusal to buy the 60% of the team that he did not already own. The original intended buyer, Shahid Khan, would later acquire the Jaguars after the 2011 season. Pursuant to NFL rules, owners are prohibited from owning other sports teams in the same market. At the time of purchase, Kroenke, a real estate and sports mogul married to a Walmart heir (d/b/a Kroenke Sports Enterprises), owned the Denver Nuggets, the Colorado Avalanche, the Colorado Rapids, the Pepsi Center (home to the Nuggets and Avalanche) and Altitude Sports and Entertainment. These interests violated the NFL's cross-ownership rule. Nevertheless, on August 25, 2010, NFL owners unanimously approved Kroenke as the owner of the franchise contingent upon his eventual divestment of his Colorado sports interests. Kroenke complied with the rule when he transferred ownership of the Nuggets, the Avalanche, the Pepsi Center and the Altitude to his son Josh.

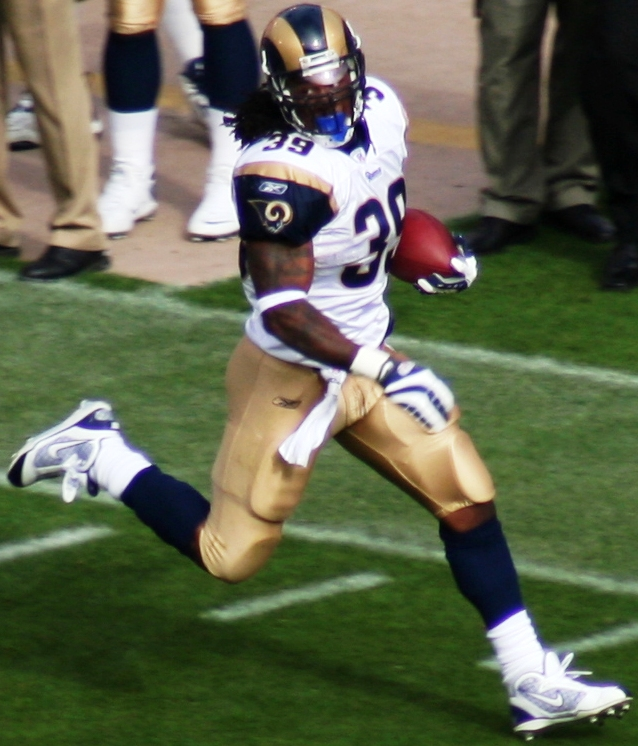
Rams’ all-time leading rusher running back Steven Jackson

=== 2010–2014: Sam Bradford & Jeff Fisher ===
Sam Bradford became the quarterback of the Rams in 2010.

For having the NFL's worst record at 1–15 in 2009, the Rams earned the #1 overall pick in the 2010 NFL draft and used it to acquire University of Oklahoma quarterback Sam Bradford.

Bradford was the main focus of the 2010 offseason. In order to make room for the new quarterback, Keith Null and several other unproductive players were cut from the roster. The Rams lost their season opener against the Cardinals with Bradford throwing three interceptions, including one on the last play of the game. They recorded their first win by beating Washington and ending a 14-game home-losing streak in Week 3. In Week 4, the Rams ended a 10-game losing streak against Seattle, 20–3. After being trounced 44–6 by Detroit, they returned home in Week 6 to beat San Diego 20–17. Bradford continued to show promise through the season despite struggling from his inexperience. Despite a 7–8 record, the Rams had a chance to win the NFC West when they traveled to 6–9 Seattle for a prime-time matchup. However, the Seahawks won the game and the division, 16–6. Bradford went on to win the 2010 Offensive Rookie of the Year award.

The 2011 season started disastrously, with the Rams opening 0–6, finally winning in an improbable victory over the Saints in Week 8. The team finished 2–14, with their only other win being a Week 10 victory over Cleveland. Bradford missed half the season with an ankle injury, and the Rams’ offense was rated the worst in the league.

At the conclusion of a poor 2011, Spagnuolo and nearly all of the coaching staff were fired except offensive coordinator Josh McDaniels, who was asked by the New England Patriots to return during the playoffs (he had been an assistant coach there prior to his disastrous stint as Denver Broncos head coach in 2009). The Rams then hired head coach Jeff Fisher, who had led the Tennessee Titans in their Super Bowl XXXIV loss to the Rams 12 years earlier. Fisher would then influence the hiring of new general manager Les Snead and an all-new coaching staff including offensive coordinator Brian Schottenheimer and defensive coordinator Gregg Williams. Williams was eventually suspended for the entire 2012 season for his part in the Saints bounty scandal.

Despite the 2011 fiasco, the Rams continued with their plans to rebuild the team around Bradford and convinced the Redskins to give up two first-round draft picks and one second-round draft pick in exchange for the Rams’ #2 overall pick. This moved the Rams down to the #6 pick in the 2012 NFL draft, which they in turn traded to Dallas, but were left with an abundance of others for future use. Following the draft, they signed undrafted Oregon State punter Johnny Hekker, who would become a Pro Bowl-caliber player.

The Rams started 2012 with low hopes, but the draft trade with Washington confirmed Bradford would be their quarterback of the future. The team then surprised some by starting off 3–2, their first winning record since 2006. They then lost three straight, but rebounded with a solid 4–4–1 finish, including a 24–24 road tie with eventual NFC champion San Francisco, to finish 7–8–1, a five-game improvement over 2011 and an impressive 4–1–1 record in the very competitive NFC West.

In 2013, the Rams finished with a 7–9 record. In the 2014 season, their 20th in St. Louis, the team would again miss the playoffs with a 6–10 record. Bradford missed the entire 2014 season with an injury, allowing Shaun Hill and Austin Davis opportunities at quarterback.

=== 2015: Nick Foles and the final season in St. Louis ===
On March 10, 2015, the Rams were involved in a rare trade of starting quarterbacks as they traded Bradford along with a fifth-round pick in 2015 to the Philadelphia Eagles in exchange for the Eagles' Nick Foles along with a fourth-round pick in 2015 and a second-round pick in 2016. Foles had a 14–4 record as starter and a TD–INT ratio of 46–17, while Bradford had an 18–30–1 record. On the day of the 2015 draft the Rams traded Zac Stacy, the Rams’ 2013 rushing leader, for a seventh-round pick to the Jets.

The Rams opened their 2015 season at home against Seattle. In Foles’ Rams debut, he threw for 297 yards and a touchdown. Following the dramatic win, Foles struggled against his former divisional rival, the Redskins as the Rams lost 24–10. Foles' accuracy improved the following week but he threw no touchdowns and his first interception as a Ram against the Steelers, dropping the team to 1–2. Following the two losses Foles bounced back, handing the unbeaten Cardinals their first loss of the season. After that game, Foles’ problems with turnovers from 2014 started to show, as he completed 11 passes out of 30 for 141 yards, 1 touchdown, and a career-high 4 interceptions against the Green Bay Packers. On November 16, Foles was benched in favor of Case Keenum, who would start the remainder of the season.

=== Todd Gurley's arrival ===
Leading the team through their turbulence was rookie running back Todd Gurley. Gurley was drafted 10th overall in the 2015 NFL draft. Gurley, who tore his ACL in November 2014, saw his rehabilitation go ahead of schedule and during the team's preseason, while he did not play, he practiced without pads on. Soon after, Gurley was medically cleared for full contact by St. Louis team physicians. On September 27, 2015, he made his NFL debut against the Pittsburgh Steelers. He was eased into action and finished the game with 6 rushes for 9 yards. The following week, the Rams visited undefeated Arizona for an NFC west divisional matchup. Again Gurley started slow with just 2 yards at halftime, but rushed for 144 yards in the second half as the Rams edged the Cardinals 24–22. The next three games against the Packers, Browns, and 49ers would see Gurley rush for at least 128 rushing yards per game. He scored his first NFL touchdown on October 25, 2015, against the Cleveland Browns. With 566 yards in his first four NFL starts, Gurley became the most prolific rusher in his first four NFL games since the AFL–NFL merger. In Week 15, Gurley became the third rookie in Rams history to rush for 1,000 yards in a season after Jerome Bettis and Eric Dickerson in the Rams 31–23 victory over the Buccaneers. and in their 23–17 victory over the Seattle Seahawks and becoming the second Rams rookie to rush for 1,000 yards and 10 touchdowns since Eric Dickerson in 1983.

The Rams played their final home game against the Tampa Bay Buccaneers, on December 17, 2015. While the Edward Jones Dome was not at sell out capacity, a sizeable group of Rams fans attended the game, holding signs that read “Keep the Rams in St. Louis.” Enthusiastic chants of “Keep the Rams” and “Kroenke Sucks” were heard during and after the game. Despite offensive production from Tampa Bay, the Rams still managed a 31–23 victory with Case Keenum throwing for 234 yards and 2 touchdowns, Todd Gurley rushing 48 yards, Tavon Austin rushing 32 yards and a touchdown, Kenny Britt receiving for 71 yards and 1 touchdown, and Jared Cook receiving for 64 yards. The Rams offense dominated this game as well the defense also put pressure on the Buccaneers quarterback Jameis Winston.

On December 22, 2015, Todd Gurley, along with fellow Rams players Aaron Donald and Johnny Hekker were selected to be part of the 2016 Pro Bowl. Gurley was one of three rookies to be selected to the Pro Bowl, along with Chiefs cornerback Marcus Peters and Seahawks wide receiver and kick returner Tyler Lockett. The Rams concluded their season with two road games in the West, winning 23–17 against the Seahawks and losing 19–16 in overtime against the 49ers. Overall, the team finished their final season in St. Louis with a 7–9 record.

== Stadium problems; return to Los Angeles ==
=== National Car Rental Field proposal ===
In an effort to try to keep the team in St. Louis, a multipurpose stadium, National Car Rental Field, was proposed in 2015, estimated to cost $1.1 billion. The initial proposal called for the stadium to be paid for by a combination of $250 million from Rams, a $200 million loan from the NFL, $130 million from personal seat license sales, $55 million in tax credits and other public incentives, $350 million from extending the state bonds originally issued for the construction of the Edward Jones Dome.

On January 9, 2016, the NFL distributed a report to team owners calling the St. Louis stadium plan "unsatisfactory and inadequate" to keep the Rams in St. Louis.

=== Kroenke purchase of land for L.A. stadium ===
On January 31, 2014, both the Los Angeles Times and the St. Louis Post-Dispatch reported that Rams owner Stan Kroenke purchased approximately 60 acres (24 ha) of land adjacent to the Forum in Inglewood, California for a purchase price rumored to be between $90 million and $100 million. Commissioner Roger Goodell represented that Mr. Kroenke informed the league of the purchase. As an NFL owner, any purchase of land in which a potential stadium could be built must be disclosed to the league. Kroenke subsequently announced plans to build an NFL stadium on the site, in connection with the owners of the adjacent 238-acre (96 ha) Hollywood Park site, Stockbridge Capital Group.

On January 5, 2015, the Los Angeles Times reported that Stan Kroenke and Stockbridge Capital Group were partnering up to develop a new NFL stadium on the Inglewood property owned by Kroenke. The project includes a stadium of 80,000 seats, and a performance venue of 6,000 seats, while reconfiguring the previously approved Hollywood Park plan for up to 890,000 square feet (83,000 m^{2}) of retail, 780,000 square feet (72,000 m^{2}) of office space, 2,500 new residential units, a 300-room hotel and 25 acres (10 ha) of public parks, playgrounds, open space and pedestrian and bicycle access. The stadium was projected to be ready by 2018.

On February 24, 2015, the Inglewood City Council approved the stadium plan and the initiative, and construction began on the new stadium on December 21, 2015, on the former Hollywood Park site.

=== Filing for relocation; Houston meetings ===
The Chargers organization was given the first option to join the Rams after a year (if they failed to reach a new stadium deal with the city of San Diego); the Chargers exercised this option on January 12, 2017, making Los Angeles home to two NFL franchises again. (Had the Chargers declined to exercise this option, then the Raiders would have had this option.)

=== Aftermath in St. Louis ===
St. Louis lost two of its NFL teams to cities in the Western United States (Los Angeles and Phoenix). In 2017, the city filed a lawsuit regarding the loss of the Rams, stating issues like the continued payments on the Edward Jones Dome, the breach on contract, and the failure to release financial files. The lawsuit was settled in 2021 for $790 million.

Stan Kroenke became extremely unpopular in St. Louis after the Rams left; the move was seen as the ultimate betrayal for a Cole Camp, Missouri, native who was named after two St. Louis Cardinals players (his full name, "Enos Stanley Kroenke", references Enos Slaughter and Stan Musial). Two other teams owned by Kroenke Sports and Entertainment, the Colorado Avalanche and Colorado Rapids, are in the same division or conference as the St. Louis Blues and St. Louis City SC respectively, and it is not uncommon to hear fans chant "Kroenke Sucks" or "Fuck You Kroenke" at St. Louis sporting events such as St. Louis BattleHawks games or when the Avalanche and Rapids visit St. Louis. During the 2022 Stanley Cup Final, then Tampa Bay Lightning player and St. Louis native Patrick Maroon stated that part of his motivation for wanting to beat the Avalanche was to get back at Kroenke for moving the Rams, and coincidentally during the 2022 playoffs, the Blues and the Avalanche had met in the second round where Blues fans often showed their displeasure towards Kroenke over the move.

In 2020, St. Louis was one of the cities to receive a football team from the rebranded XFL, dubbed the St. Louis BattleHawks. They played several games in The Dome at America's Center, and notably led the league in fan attendance.

The last player to play continuously for the Rams from the St. Louis years was offensive tackle Rob Havenstein, who retired in 2026.

== Season results ==
=== Key ===
- The finish, wins, losses, and ties columns list regular season results and exclude any postseason play. Regular and postseason records are combined only at the bottom of the list.

| NFL champions (1920–1969) | Super Bowl champions (1970–present) | Conference champions | Division champions | Wild card berth | One-game playoff berth |

=== Seasons ===
| Season | Team | League | Conference | Division | Regular season | | | | Postseason results | Awards |
| Season | Team | League | Conference | Division | Finish | Wins | Losses | Ties | Postseason results | Awards |
|---|---|---|---|---|---|---|---|---|---|---|
St. Louis Rams (Note: The team had a new logo featuring the Gateway Arch National Park, which was known as the Jefferson National Expansion Memorial at the time, for this season to honor the move to St. Louis)
| 1995 | 1995 | NFL | NFC | West | 3rd | 7 | 9 | 0 | | |
| 1996 | 1996 | NFL | NFC | West | 3rd | 6 | 10 | 0 | | |
| 1997 | 1997 | NFL | NFC | West | 5th | 5 | 11 | 0 | | |
| 1998 | 1998 | NFL | NFC | West | 5th | 4 | 12 | 0 | | |
| 1999 | 1999 | NFL | NFC | West | 1st | 13 | 3 | 0 | Won Divisional Playoffs (Vikings) 49–37; Won Conference Championship (Buccaneers) 11–6; Won Super Bowl XXXIV (Note: This game featured The Tackle.) (3) (vs. Titans) 23–16 | Dick Vermeil (COY); Kurt Warner (MVP)/(SB MVP); Marshall Faulk (OPOY) |
| 2000 | 2000 | NFL | NFC | West | 2nd | 10 | 6 | 0 | Lost Wild Card Playoffs (at Saints) 28–31 | Marshall Faulk (MVP)/(OPOY) |
| 2001 | 2001 | NFL | NFC | West | 1st | 14 | 2 | 0 | Won Divisional Playoffs (Packers) 45–17; Won Conference Championship (Eagles) 29–24; Lost Super Bowl XXXVI (vs. Patriots) 17–20 | Kurt Warner (MVP); Marshall Faulk (OPOY) |
| 2002 | 2002 | NFL | NFC | West | 2nd | 7 | 9 | 0 | | |
| 2003 | 2003 | NFL | NFC | West | 1st | 12 | 4 | 0 | Lost Divisional Playoffs (Panthers) 23–29 (2OT) | |
| 2004 | 2004 | NFL | NFC | West | 2nd | 8 | 8 | 0 | Won Wild Card Playoffs (at Seahawks) 27–20; Lost Divisional Playoffs (at Falcons) 17–47 | |
| 2005 | 2005 | NFL | NFC | West | 2nd | 6 | 10 | 0 | | |
| 2006 | 2006 | NFL | NFC | West | 2nd | 8 | 8 | 0 | | |
| 2007 | 2007 | NFL | NFC | West | 4th | 3 | 13 | 0 | | |
| 2008 | 2008 | NFL | NFC | West | 4th | 2 | 14 | 0 | | |
| 2009 | 2009 | NFL | NFC | West | 4th | 1 | 15 | 0 | | |
| 2010 | 2010 | NFL | NFC | West | 2nd | 7 | 9 | 0 | | Sam Bradford (OROY) |
| 2011 | 2011 | NFL | NFC | West | 4th | 2 | 14 | 0 | | |
| 2012 | 2012 | NFL | NFC | West | 3rd | 7 | 8 | 1 | | |
| 2013 | 2013 | NFL | NFC | West | 4th | 7 | 9 | 0 | | |
| 2014 | 2014 | NFL | NFC | West | 4th | 6 | 10 | 0 | | Aaron Donald (DROY) |
| 2015 | 2015 | NFL | NFC | West | 3rd | 7 | 9 | 0 | | Todd Gurley (OROY) |
| Total 3 Division Titles 2 Conference Titles Super Bowl XXXIV win | | | | | | 142 | 193 | 1 | (regular season) (Note: 1995-2015) | |
| Total 3 Division Titles 2 Conference Titles Super Bowl XXXIV win | | | | | | 6 | 4 | 0 | (playoffs) | |
| Total 3 Division Titles 2 Conference Titles Super Bowl XXXIV win | | | | | | 148 | 197 | 1 | (regular season and playoffs) | |

- The St. Louis Rams played a total of 336 Regular Season Games and 10 Playoff Games (346 Games)

== Notable players ==
=== Retired numbers ===
Numbers of players who played in St. Louis that have been retired by the Rams:

St. Louis Rams retired numbers
| No. | Player | Position | Tenure | Retired |
| 28 | Marshall Faulk | RB | 1999–2005 | December 21, 2007 |
| 78 | Jackie Slater | OT | 1976-1995 | 1996 |
| 80 | Isaac Bruce | WR | 1995–2007 | October 31, 2010 |

=== Pro Football Hall of Famers ===
St. Louis Rams Hall of Famers
| No. | Player | Class | Position(s) | Tenure |
| 78 | Jackie Slater | 2001 | OT | 1976-1995 |
| 36 | Jerome Bettis | 2015 | RB | 1993-1995 |
| 35 | Aeneas Williams | 2014 | FS | 2001-2004 |
| 28 | Marshall Faulk | 2011 | RB | 1999–2006 |
| 76 | Orlando Pace | 2016 | OT | 1997–2008 |
| 13 | Kurt Warner | 2017 | QB | 1998-2003 |
| 80 | Isaac Bruce | 2020 | WR | 1995-2007 |

=== Pro Bowl selections ===
St. Louis Rams Pro Bowl selections
| No. | Player | Position | Years |
| 76 | Orlando Pace | OT | 1999, 2000, 2001, 2002, 2003, 2004, 2005 |
| 81, 88 | Torry Holt | WR | 2000, 2001, 2003, 2004, 2005, 2006, 2007 |
| 80 | Isaac Bruce | WR | 1996, 1999, 2000, 2001 |
| 28 | Marshall Faulk | RB | 1999, 2000, 2001, 2002 |
| 13 | Kurt Warner | QB | 1999, 2000, 2001 |
| 39 | Steven Jackson | RB | 2006, 2009, 2010 |
| 35 | Aeneas Williams | DB | 2001, 2003 |
| 10 | Marc Bulger | QB | 2003, 2006 |
| 94 | Robert Quinn | DE | 2013, 2014 |
| 6 | Johnny Hekker | P | 2013, 2015 |
| 99 | Aaron Donald | DT | 2014, 2015 |
| 30 | Todd Gurley | RB | 2015 |
| 93 | Kevin Carter | DE | 1999 |
| 41 | Todd Lyght | CB | 1999 |
| 62 | Adam Timmerman | OG | 2001 |
| 91 | Leonard Little | DE | 2003 |
| 14 | Jeff Wilkins | K | 2003 |
| 75 | D'Marco Farr | DT | 1999 |

== See also ==
- History of the Cleveland Rams
- History of the Los Angeles Rams
- History of the St. Louis Cardinals (NFL)
- St. Louis Gunners
- St. Louis All-Stars

== Bibliography ==
- Everson, Linda (1995). St. Louis Rams Facts & Trivia. South Bend: The E.B. Houchin Company. ISBN 0-938313-13-4
- Hession, Joseph (1987). The Rams: Five Decades of Football. San Francisco: Foghorn Press.
- Hunstein, Jim (2000). How 'Bout Them Rams; A Guide to Rams Football History. St. Louis: Palmerston & Reed. ISBN 0-911921-62-1
- LaBlanc, Michael L.; with Ruby, Mary K. (1994). Professional Sports Team Histories: Football. Detroit: Gale Research Inc. ISBN 0-8103-8861-8
- Levy, Alan H. (2003). Tackling Jim Crow, Racial Segregation in Professional Football. Jefferson, North Carolina: McFarland and Co., Inc. ISBN 0-7864-1597-5
- Littlewood, Thomas B. (1990). Arch: A Promoter, not a Poet: The Story of Arch Ward. Ames, Iowa: Iowa State University Press. ISBN 0-8138-0277-6
- Lyons, Robert S. (2010). On Any Given Sunday, A Life of Bert Bell. Philadelphia: Temple University Press. ISBN 978-1-59213-731-2
- MacCambridge, Michael (2005). America's Game: The Epic Story of How Pro Football Captured a Nation. New York: Anchor Books ISBN 978-0-307-48143-6
- McDonough, Will (1994). 75 Seasons: The Complete Story of the National Football League. Atlanta: Turner Publishing, Inc. ISBN 1-57036-056-1
- Peterson, Robert W. (1997). Pigskin: The Early Years of Pro Football. New York: Oxford University Press. ISBN 0-19-507607-9
- Ross, Charles K. (1999). Outside the Lines: African Americans and the Integration of the National Football League. New York: New York Publishing Company. ISBN 0-8147-7495-4
- Strode, Woody; with Young, Sam (1990). Goal Dust. Lanham, Maryland: Madison Books. ISBN 0-8191-7680-X
- Sullivan, George (1968). Pro Football's All Time Greats. New York: G. P. Putnam's Sons. p. 23–28.
- Willis, Chris (2010). The Man Who Built the National Football League: Joe F. Carr. Lanham, Maryland: Scarecrow Press, Inc. ISBN 978-0-8108-7669-9
