= Rosenblum =

Rosenblum is a Jewish surname of German origin, which means "rose flower". Notable people with the surname include:

- Adi Rosenblum (born 1962), Israeli artist
- Bernard Rosenblum (1927–2007), French artist
- Constance Rosenblum (born 1943), American writer
- Daniel N. Rosenblum, American diplomat
- Deborah Rosenblum, American nuclear expert
- Donald E. Rosenblum (1929-2022), American military officer
- Ellen Rosenblum (born 1951), American politician
- Emma Rosenblum, American media executive
- Erica Bree Rosenblum, American herpetologist and biologist
- Frank Rosenblum (1888-1973), American labor unionist
- Henry Rosenblum, American cantor
- Herzl Rosenblum (1903–1991), Israeli journalist and politician
- Ilya Rosenblum (1939–2025), Russian politician
- Irit Rosenblum (born 1958), Israeli lawyer and political activist
- John Frank Rosenblum (born 1970), American filmmaker
- Jonathan Rosenblum (born 1951), American rabbi and journalist
- Jonathan Rosenblum (activist) (born 1961), American labor activist
- Joshua Rosenblum (born 1963), American musician
- Lawrence J. Rosenblum (born 1949), American mathematician
- Louis Rosenblum (1923-2019), American Jewish activist and scientist
- Mary Rosenblum (1952-2018), American writer
- Mathew Rosenblum (born 1954), American composer
- Mendel Rosenblum (born 1962), American computer scientist
- Michael Rosenblum (born 1954), American journalist
- Mort Rosenblum (born 1944), American journalist
- Myer Rosenblum (1907-2002), Australian sportsman and lawyer
- Nancy L. Rosenblum (born 1947), American political scientist
- Naomi Rosenblum (1925-2021), American photography historian
- Nina Rosenblum (born 1950), American filmmaker
- Pnina Rosenblum (born 1954), Israeli actress, fashion model, businesswoman and politician
- Ralph Rosenblum (1925–1995), American film editor
- Rebecca Rosenblum (born 1978), Canadian writer
- Robert Rosenblum (1927–2006), American art historian and curator
- Rupert Rosenblum (born 1942), Australian Rugby Union player
- Salomon Rosenblum (1896–1959), Polish nuclear physicist
- Steven Rosenblum (born 1954), American film editor
- Walter Rosenblum (1919–2006), American photographer
- Yair Rosenblum (1944–1996), Israeli composer and musician

== See also ==
- Rosenbaum
- Rosenbloom (disambiguation)
