= Frontiere =

Frontiere is a surname. Notable people with the surname include:

- Dominic Frontiere (1931–2017), American composer, arranger, and jazz accordionist
- Georgia Frontiere (1927–2008), American businesswoman and entertainer
