= Lonnie Nelson =

American activist

- Born: Madelon Sue Nelson; August 20, 1932; Seattle, Washington, United States
- Died: 12 February 2014 (aged 81); Swedish Hospital, Seattle, Washington, United States
- Occupations: Civil rights, Indigenous peoples, labor, peace, and social justice activist
- Years active: 1940s to 2014
- Known for: Co-founder of the Seattle branch of the Coalition of Labor Union Women; Founding member, Seattle Mothers for Police Accountability
- Parent(s): Burt Gale Nelson and Alma Viola (Nickerson) Nelson

Lonnie Nelson (1932–2014), also known as Madelon Nelson and Madelon S. Healy, was an American labor, peace, civil rights, social justice, and Indigenous peoples activist in Seattle, Washington in the United States.

Following her death in 2014, Nelson was described by the Rev. Harriett Walden, the founder of Seattle Mothers for Police Accountability, as someone who "never got discouraged."

"To the very last minute, she was still organizing. Sometimes people stop, or they give up or they say 'I'm done with this,' but that wasn't Lonnie's way."

== Formative years and family ==
Born as Madelon Sue Nelson on August 20, 1932, in Seattle, Washington in the United States, Lonnie Nelson was a daughter of Burt Gale Nelson and Alma Viola (Nickerson) Nelson. Her father, a leader of the Communist Party in the State of Washington, was one of the founders of the International Longshore and Warehouse Union.

Educated in the public schools of Seattle, she began writing poetry in her youth, organized a Young Progressives chapter at Lincoln High School in 1948 and also participated in the campaign by Henry A. Wallace to become President of the United States. Wallace, a Progressive Party candidate, was defeated.

She married John M. Healy in Seattle on September 11, 1950.

She then went on to attend Seattle Central Community College (now Seattle Central College) and subsequently followed her father into Communist Party work after joining the party in 1951.

Employed in Seattle's meat-packing industry during the 1950s and 1960s, she became an organizer for the International Brotherhood of Teamsters and the United Food and Commercial Workers labor unions.

She was divorced from John Healy on March 24, 1976.

== Activism ==
During the 1950s, Nelson helped to gather signatures for a petition drive in support of the Stockholm Appeal and helped to plan peace protests against negative positions taken by the United States government against Cuba and Vietnam. After traveling with her uncle to Spain as members of the Abraham Lincoln Brigade, she and her uncle were honored for their efforts there to fight the fascist policies of Francisco Franco.

During the 1960s, she joined with other activists to speak out against actions that were being taken by local, state and federal government agencies against the Black Panther Party. She also relocated her family to Seattle's Central District when she realized that the Communist Party was interested in helping revitalize the area and in improving employment opportunities for African Americans in that neighborhood. In 1972, she chaired a petition drive to pressure the Washington State Attorney General to prohibit government agencies from requiring job candidates and existing employees to take a McCarthy-era loyalty oath. That same year, she participated in the "Trail of Broken Treaties," an occupation of the United States Bureau of Indian Affairs in Washington, D.C., and interviewed Hank Adams and other Indigenous community leaders for articles in the Daily World newspaper. In 1973, she participated in the Wounded Knee Occupation.

In addition, she began writing for and helping to distribute The People's World, a Communist newspaper that was based in San Francisco. During this period of her life, she also joined in several other campaigns to support the rights of Indigenous people, including a tribal fishing rights campaign that culminated with a 1974 judicial ruling by Judge George Hugo Boldt, United States v. Washington, that reaffirmed and restored legal rights stated that tribes were entitled to half of the salmon catch each year. Nelson was arrested for civil disobedience during that campaign.

In the early 1980s, Nelson filed a sex discrimination lawsuit against the ILWU after being denied B-class registration. Employed by Providence Hospital as a daycare worker during the 1980s, she joined the Service Employees International Union (SEIU Local 6) in 1985. She then helped to organize her fellow daycare workers and secure their representation by SEIU.

She also helped to found a branch of the Coalition of Labor Union Women (CLUW) in Seattle and subsequently chaired the CLUW Public Works Jobs Committee.

While protesting South Africa's system of apartheid, she was arrested by Seattle police for civil disobedience.

During the 1990s, she was arrested a third time for civil disobedience while protesting cuts to Medicare that were proposed by Newt Gingrich under his Contract with America.

Among the friends Nelson made over the years were Maiselle Bridges, a leader of the Nisqually Indian Tribe of the Nisqually Reservation, Jonathan Rosenblum, a Service Employees International Union (SEIU) organizer, and the Rev. Harriett Walden, who founded Seattle Mothers for Police Accountability (MFPA).

Retired from her day job in 1993, Nelson continued her activist efforts as a volunteer, trying to improve the quality of life for workers and vulnerable individuals in the Seattle region for the remainder of her life.

In 1995, she and her friend and fellow activist, Irene Hull, were arrested together while protesting Medicare cuts.

Nelson was also still involved with Seattle Mothers for Police Accountability at the beginning of the twenty-first century.

== Illness and death ==
An active member of the Communist Party until she suffered a stroke in early February 2014, Nelson died at Seattle's Swedish Hospital on February 12 of that year. She was eighty-three years old.
