= Georgia Frontiere =

American businesswoman (1927–2008)

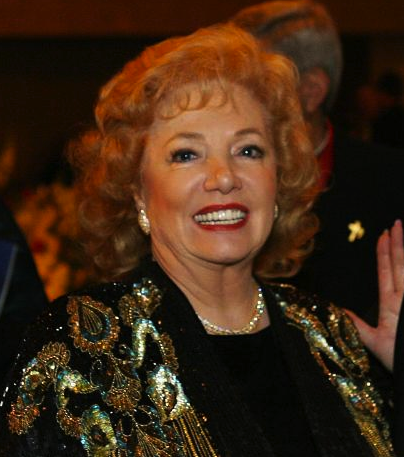
- Frontiere in 2006
- Born: Violet Frances Irwin; November 21, 1927; St. Louis, Missouri, U.S.
- Died: January 18, 2008 (aged 80); Los Angeles, California, U.S.
- Occupations: Businesswoman; entertainer; philanthropist
- Political party: Republican
- Spouses: Francis J. Geiger (m. 1946; died 1946) Bruce B. Johnson (m. 1949; div. 1955) Wallace Hayes (m. 1955; div. 1958) William J. Wyler (m. 1958; div. 1958) Carroll Rosenbloom (m. 1966; died 1979) Dominic Frontiere (m. 1980; div. 1988)
- Partner: Earle Weatherwax (1989–2008; her death)
- Children: 2, including Chip Rosenbloom
- Parent(s): Lucia Pamela Irwin; Reginald Irwin

Georgia Frontiere (born Violet Frances Irwin; November 21, 1927 – January 18, 2008) was an American businesswoman and entertainer. She was the majority owner and chairperson of the Los Angeles/St. Louis Rams NFL team.

During her nearly three decades in charge (1979–2008), the Rams made the playoffs in 14 seasons, played in 25 postseason games, won 13 postseason games, reached the Super Bowl three times and won the championship game once in the 1999 season. Her commitment to the team earned her the nickname "Madame Ram".

Also a philanthropist, Frontiere created the St. Louis Rams Foundation, sat on the board of the local United Way chapter, the Saint Louis Symphony Orchestra, Herbert Hoover Boys and Girls Club, Crohn's and Colitis Foundation of America and the American Foundation for AIDS Research and made numerous charitable contributions both to the arts and to other organizations in St. Louis and elsewhere.

== Early life and education ==
Frontiere was born in St. Louis, Missouri, to Lucia Pamela, Miss St. Louis of 1926, KMOX radio's 'gal about town', and the leader of United States' first all-girl orchestra (Lucia Pamela and her band of musical pirates), and Reginald Irwin, an insurance salesman and businessman.

Frontiere had early aspirations to work as an opera singer and eventually traveled to Milan to train with the Milan Opera. By ten years old, she performed along with her mother and brother in the singing group the Pamela Trio. The act entertained at ballrooms and state fairs.

Frontiere attended Soldan High School in St. Louis.

When she was fifteen, Frontiere's parents divorced, and she married a young U.S. Marine who was heading to Europe during World War II. The union was quickly annulled. A few years later, the family moved to Fresno, California, where Frontiere performed at dinner theatres alongside her mother in a duo, the Pamela Sisters. During this time, she married her second husband, who was killed in a mysterious car accident near San Francisco shortly after the couple had wed.

== Early career ==
In the early 1950s, Frontiere worked as a urologist's secretary while acting in Fresno's Garrick Little Theatre (where she met her third husband). The couple divorced a short time later. She later married her fourth husband, a stage manager at the Sacramento Music Circus, but the couple split after five years.

In the late 1950s, Frontiere moved to Miami and hosted her own television interview show. During this time, Frontiere met her fifth husband, a Miami television producer, to whom she was married for a short time. She later made appearances as part of NBC's Today show cast. She also performed as a nightclub singer in Miami, where she met Baltimore Colts owner Carroll Rosenbloom, who was separated from his first wife, at a party hosted by Joseph Kennedy at his Palm Beach estate in 1957. Kennedy was an admirer of Frontiere after seeing her on the morning show. Rosenbloom and Frontiere were engaged in 1960, but it took Rosenbloom ten years to divorce his first wife. Rosenbloom and Frontiere married in 1966, though they had been together for eight years and had two children by that point.

In 1972, Rosenbloom traded ownership of the Baltimore Colts for ownership of the Los Angeles Rams. During this time, the couple resided in Bel Air, California and Frontiere became a part of the Los Angeles social scene, hosting numerous parties and philanthropic events. Frontiere was also known to entertain guests in a section near the owner's box at the Los Angeles Memorial Coliseum dubbed "Georgia's Grandstand".

In April 1979, Rosenbloom drowned while swimming near a Florida beach from an apparent heart attack. Frontiere was widely suspected of murdering her husband in a murder for hire plot, suspicions heightened when a witness to Rosenbloom’s drowning came forward and said he saw a black object, the size of a man, converged with Rosenbloom in the ocean, and then diverge from Rosenbloom after the latter went under the water; though overworked medical examiners ruled the death an accidental drowning.

== National Football League ==
Upon her husband's death, Frontiere inherited a 70% ownership stake in the Los Angeles Rams. Rosenbloom's five children inherited the other 30%.

Although she was often called the first female owner of an NFL franchise, Frontiere was actually the second female majority owner. Violet Bidwill Wolfner inherited the Chicago Cardinals after her husband's death in 1947 and owned the franchise until she died in 1962. However, during Frontiere's tenure, she was the only active female majority owner in the NFL.

During her years as owner, Frontiere moved the Rams twice, first relocating from the Los Angeles Memorial Coliseum in 1980 to Anaheim (a deal that Rosenbloom had struck in 1978), then to St. Louis in 1995.

=== Los Angeles Rams ===
Initially criticized and harassed as a woman in a league dominated by men and accused of not being capable of running a football team, Frontiere quickly asserted control of the Rams, named John Shaw president and addressed her detractors during her first press conference, saying, "There are some who feel there are two different kinds of people—human beings and women."

Her inheritance came as a surprise to many fans (though not to close friends and family) who thought Steve Rosenbloom, the former owner's son from a previous marriage and the Rams' vice president, would take a leadership role in the team's management. However, Frontiere could not settle conflicts that arose between Rosenbloom and general manager Don Klosterman, and she fired Rosenbloom after four months.

During the 1970s, the Rams were a perennial contender, but a championship or a Super Bowl appearance eluded them. However, the team lacked organizational direction in the early stages of Frontiere's ownership. During the preseason, Frontiere drafted a position paper in which she asserted her role as the team's boss. Believing that a lack of direction was responsible for the Rams' inability to win a championship (despite fielding talented teams), she told Sports Illustrated, "Right now, we don't have much leadership. Oh, they played well—they're trying to earn their positions—and I'm not talking about the coaching. We have good coaching. I'm talking about the top. There are some things that have to be ironed out."

The next season, the Rams reached Super Bowl XIV but lost to the three-time champion Pittsburgh Steelers 31-19. After the Super Bowl, Frontiere increased her national profile by appearing on the cover of Sports Illustrated and in an American Express commercial with Rams players.

By the mid-1980s, Frontiere had passed much of the Rams' daily financial and football management responsibilities to key executives. According to ESPN, "When it came to football matters, Mrs. Frontiere delegated to longtime team President John Shaw, to whom she granted considerable autonomy." As the decade began, the 1970s Rams players gradually retired, but the team still reached the playoffs seven times between 1980 and 1989. In 1980, the team moved from the Los Angeles Memorial Coliseum (a severely outdated facility that was too large to sell to capacity for most games, resulting in frequent local television blackouts) to the California Angels' Anaheim Stadium. In the early 1990s, the Rams suffered from poor attendance. Average attendance had fallen to 45,000 fans per game, well below a peak of 62,000. As a result, the Rams' finances suffered as well. In 1994, the Rams claimed to have lost $6 million and earned only $7.6 million during the previous four seasons.

In 1986, Frontiere's seventh and final husband, composer Dominic Frontiere, stirred controversy after being arrested and jailed for ten months for lying to a government agent as part of a federal investigation related to the alleged scalping of 1,000 Super Bowl tickets. Although Frontiere was not implicated and received unfavorable media attention, she supported her husband during his trial and incarceration. The pair divorced in 1987.

As the 1990s began, the Rams' fortunes had sunk very low. Most home games were subjected to local television blackouts, and the team struggled for recognition in the Los Angeles sports scene. Frontiere attempted to have a new stadium built in Los Angeles to improve ticket sales but faced difficulty gathering support in a period of unfavorable economic conditions. The failure to build support for a new stadium, combined with waning fan interest, prompted Frontiere to move the team to her hometown of St. Louis.

=== St. Louis Rams ===
Lured by incentives such as $20 million in annual profits from guaranteed season-ticket sales, personal seat licenses and a favorable lease at the $280-million Trans World Dome that was under construction, Frontiere moved the team to St. Louis in 1995. As part of the deal, Frontiere agreed to cede 40% of her ownership share to Stan Kroenke, who became a minority owner in the team. The NFL, which had decided that the city was unsuitable as a football market, initially voted to block the Rams' move to St. Louis. However, when Frontiere threatened to sue the league under antitrust laws, the league relented and approved the move, with Frontiere casting the deciding vote in a 23-6 decision (the Giants, Jets, Steelers, Cardinals, Bills and Redskins voted against the proposal and the Raiders abstained).

The city of St. Louis welcomed the Rams after having lost the Cardinals franchise to Phoenix, Arizona in 1988. After the announced move, the city hosted a rally downtown and thousands of fans chanted "Georgia, Georgia!" Later, Frontiere said, "St. Louis is my home, and I brought my team here to start a new dynasty."

The Rams struggled for the first few years in their new home, but in the 1999 season, the team led by coach Dick Vermeil, offensive coordinator Mike Martz and undrafted former Arena Football League quarterback Kurt Warner defeated the Tennessee Titans to win Super Bowl XXXIV. The team was dubbed "the Greatest Show on Turf" because of its high-scoring offense.

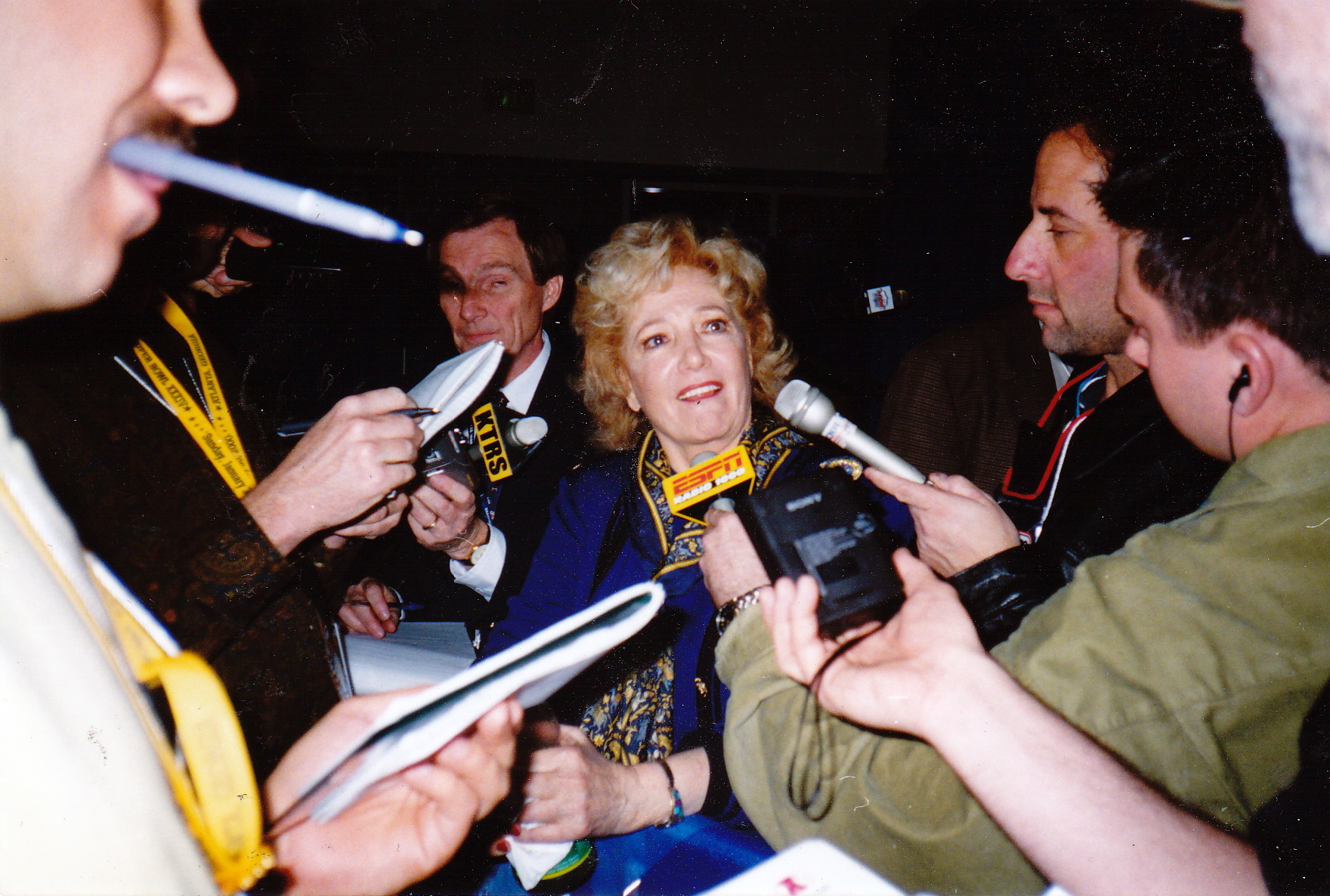
At Super Bowl XXXIV

On the night of the victory, Frontiere expressed her desire to succeed, saying: "From the time my late husband died, it has been a constant effort to do what he expected me to be able to do. He said: 'If anybody can, you can. You always stick to your ideas. And nobody pushes you around.'"

Two years after the Super Bowl XXXIV win, the Rams again reached the Super Bowl but lost to the New England Patriots in Super Bowl XXXVI, 20–17.

The Rams reached the playoffs again in 2003 and 2004, but after Warner and other key players departed, the team again stagnated.

Upon her death in 2008, Frontiere's son Chip Rosenbloom and daughter Lucía Rodríguez inherited the 60% ownership stake in the team. In May 2010, the owners expressed that they hoped the team would be sold to longtime minority owner Stan Kroenke. On August 25, 2010, Kroenke received unanimous approval from league owners as the new owner of the Rams. Kroenke immediately bought half of the 60% share of the team held by Frontiere's children and later purchased the remaining half at a reported valuation of $750 million. The Rams returned to Los Angeles after the 2015 NFL season.

== Philanthropy ==
Throughout her career, Frontiere was devoted to a range of philanthropic causes. Speaking of Frontiere's endeavors, NFL commissioner Roger Goodell said, "Her philanthropic work was legendary and wide ranging."

In 1991, Frontiere made a $1 million donation to the Fulfillment Fund, which provides support systems to help underprivileged students pursue higher education. This help often includes mentoring, college/career counseling centers, paying for Scholastic Aptitude tests and support groups on college campuses.

Frontiere was also an outspoken supporter of the NFL Alumni Association. She rallied for the "Pre-'59ers", the 1,000-plus NFL players who retired prior to 1959 and didn't qualify for the league's pension plan. She also started a "Dire Need Fund" for the Los Angeles chapter of the NFL Alumni Association, which spawned the league-led NFL Alumni Dire Need Fund for players.

In 1997, Frontiere spearheaded the formation of the St. Louis Rams Foundation, which has contributed more than $7 million to charities in the St. Louis area. Always a patron of the arts, in 2000, Frontiere donated $1 million to help build a 5500-seat amphitheater, the Frontiere Performing Arts Pavilion, located in the Sedona Cultural Park in Arizona. As well, she produced the Tony-nominated August Wilson play "Radio Golf" and Richard Dresser's "Below the Belt."

Frontiere also sat on the boards of the United Way of Greater St. Louis, Crohn's and Colitis Foundation of America, Herbert Hoover Boys and Girls Club, Saint Louis Symphony, and the American Foundation for AIDS Research.

== Awards and recognition ==
After Frontiere's death in 2008, the Rams renamed the Community Quarterback Awards the Georgia Frontiere Community Quarterback Awards. The program awards $20,000 to local non-profits in recognition of outstanding volunteer service. Since its inception, the Rams have donated more than $170,000 to community groups.

Also in 2008, the Rams partnered with St. Jude Children's Research Hospital to host "Georgia's Drive Fore the Kids", a golf tournament to honor Frontiere and benefit the charity.

Sixth Street, between Convention Plaza and Washington, outside of the Edward Jones Dome, is now known as "Georgia's Way" to memorialize Frontiere.

Frontiere was awarded an honorary doctor of philanthropy from Pepperdine University.

== Personal life and death ==
Frontiere married seven times. She married her first husband, a young military man, at age 15; the marriage was soon annulled. Her second husband, Francis J. Geiger, died in an auto accident in San Francisco. In the 1940s and 1950s, she married three more times: to Bruce B. Johnson, a fellow actor at the Garrick Little Theater in Fresno, California; to Wallace Hayes, a stage manager at the Sacramento Music Circus; and to William J. Wyler, a Miami television personality. In 1957, she met her sixth husband, then-Baltimore Colts owner Carroll Rosenbloom; they had two children before marrying in 1966: Dale "Chip" Rosenbloom and Lucia Rosenbloom Rodriguez. Rosenbloom, who traded ownership of the Colts to Robert Irsay in exchange for his ownership stake in the Rams, died in 1979. In 1980, she married her seventh husband, composer Dominic Frontiere; they divorced in 1988 but she kept his last name. She spent the last 19 years of her life with Earle Weatherwax although they never married. She had homes in Malibu, California, St. Louis, and Cornville, Arizona.

Diagnosed with breast cancer in 2007, Frontiere spent the rest of the year undergoing treatment, but her condition rapidly deteriorated and she died in UCLA Medical Center on January 18, 2008. She was 80 years old. A statement put out by her children read, "Our mom was dedicated to being more than the owner of a football team. She loved the Rams' players, coaches and staff. The warmth and generosity she exuded will never be forgotten."

Sporting positions
Preceded by Carroll Rosenbloom	Los Angeles/St. Louis Rams owner 1979–2008	Succeeded by Chip Rosenbloom
