= Mark Rosenbloom =

American medical doctor, author, speaker, entrepreneur and coach

- Education: McGill University, Northwestern University Medical School, Stanford University
- Occupations: Medical Doctor, Author, Speaker, Entrepreneur, and Coach
- Known for: Founder of LIFEFORCE Medical Institute and The Unicorn Children’s Foundation and PEPID, LLC

Mark Rosenbloom is an American medical doctor, author, speaker, entrepreneur, and coach. He is the Founder and Chief Medical Officer of LIFEFORCE Medical Institute. He is also the Founder of The Unicorn Children’s Foundation, for children with development and communication disorders and Founder and CEO of PEPID, LLC, a point-of-care medical and drug reference software.

== Education ==
Rosenbloom was trained at McGill University (where he received his BA with Honors Economics), Northwestern University Medical School (where he received his MD and achieved early AOA status after his sophomore year), Stanford University (where he received his MBA), and the Cenegenics Education and Research Foundation.

== Career ==
Rosenbloom has practiced Emergency, Preventive, and Age Management Medicine since 1990. He is the CEO and Chief Medical Officer at LIFEFORCE Medical Institute. He completed his residency in Emergency Medicine at University of Illinois Combined Emergency Medicine Program in 1993 and practiced emergency medicine at Northwestern Memorial Hospital for close to 2 decades, achieving the rank of Associate Professor of Clinical Medicine in the Department of Medicine at Northwestern University.

Rosenbloom trained at the Cenegenics Education and Research Foundation and founded LIFEFORCE Medical Institute which focuses his practice on anti-aging and optimal health and performance utilizing comprehensive diagnostics, genetic testing and Bio-Identical Hormone Replacement Therapy (BHRP).

Rosenbloom has also been the Editor of the nationally published Your Health Magazine and has been published in print and media on various topics such as age management, low testosterone for men, BHRT, nutrition, exercise, medical errors, and vitamin toxicity. His teachings include seminars and network TV appearances on these topics in the Chicago metropolitan area.

Rosenbloom has publicly spoken multiple times regarding communication and learning disorders in children, including numerous network TV appearances in Miami, Boca Raton and Palm Beach, Florida.

== Philanthropy ==
Rosenbloom founded the Unicorn Children's Foundation for children with communication and learning disorders and is a founding member of the Interdisciplinary Council on Developmental and Learning Disorders.

== Awards ==
Rosenbloom won the Sigmund S. Winton award in Biochemistry.
