= Bernard Rosenblum =

French painter

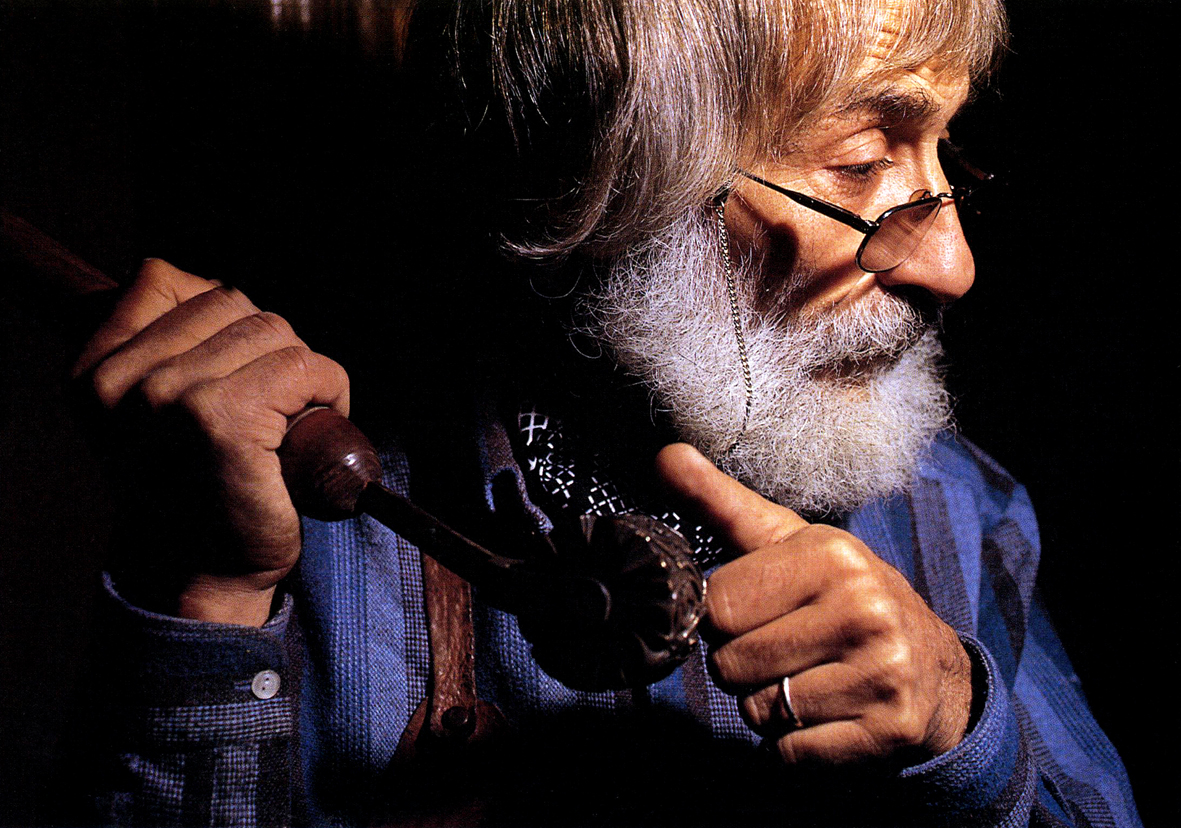
Bernard Rosenblum, Master Leather Craftsman

Bernard Rosenblum (1927–2007) was a Master Craftsman Gilder and Art Restorer of the National Museums, the successor of the workshop Gainerie (word with no English translation:"Leather Crafts Arts") Bettenfeld. He was awarded the Political deportation and internment medal as well as Commander of the Order of Civic Education.

== Early life ==
In 1940 he entered the School of Fine Arts d'Angers. Then in 1941, due to the emergency laws of the Vichy government, he was prohibited from all studies. At the end of the Second World War, at the great liberation, he successively discovered the craft of upholstering in the workshops Vial, Veil and Reperman in which he was employed as a foreman, but he found that the saddle and leather work was just a technical and commercial transaction. A little disillusioned, he abandoned, for a time, the craft of leatherwork.

Having a strong attraction for the arts, especially painting and sculpture, he became a pupil of Alberto Giacometti and Emmanuel Mane-Katz, during the golden era of Montparnasse. A family friend, who was an upholsterer, entrusted to him in 1960 the work of restoration of leather antiques, allowing him to make a living during this period in Montparnasse. He rediscovered leather and fell in love with its history. At that time he was to begin a research on leather and leather goods, in museums and libraries, which would never cease throughout his life.

He settled in 1963, as Upholsterer-Gilder, Rue de Reuilly in Paris, in the Rue du Faubourg Saint-Antoine district. He quickly created an excellent reputation. In 1965 Suzanne Bettenfeld proposed to him the succession of the prestigious Bettenfeld Studio, which then became the Studio Bettenfeld-Rosenblum. He also never stopped collecting the tools that are essential to his craft, bookbinding tools, rollers and gilding plates. Including his participation with Roger Devauchelle to buy the workshop Gruel-Engelmann; he helped create one of the largest collections of postwar tools for gilding leather.

He became a preferred Master Restorer for the national museums and great decorators and antique dealers in France and elsewhere; his clients included General Charles de Gaulle, Jean Dutourd, Claude Lévi-Strauss, King Hassan II of Morocco, the former court of Iran, and institutions such as the Army Museum, Rueil-Malmaison, Saumur, Versailles, the Paris Conservatoire.

He died suddenly in 2007. His son, David Rosenblum, reopened the studio in 2010.

== Bibliography ==
- Various journals and books in France and abroad from 1963 to 2007; Les Métiers d'Art, Marie-Claire-Japon, Connaissances des Arts, Art in America, Time, Maisons et Décorations…
- Bernard Rosenblum – De l'Artisanat d'Art à la Création Contemporaine, documentaire de Dominique Mallegni, Institut des Hautes Etudes Cinématographique, 1974 (Craft Art in Contemporary Design, documentary by Dominique Mallegni, Institute for Advanced Film Studies,1974).
- Gainier Doreur d'Art de Tradition – l'atelier Bettenfeld Rosenblum, thèse de Marie-Claire Bernard, Musée national des Arts et Traditions populaires, 1976 (Gainier Gilder Art Tradition – Workshop Bettenfeld Rosenblum, Marie-Claire Bernard, National Museum of Popular Arts and Traditions, 1976).
- Trouvailles, N°31, October – November, Dossier Artisan d'Art Bernard Rosenblum Gainier de Tradition, 1981 (File Craftsman Art Bernard Rosenblum,1981).
- Guide des Musées de France, 1984 (Guide Museums of France, 1984).
- L'Atelier Bettenfeld-Rosenblum, reportage de France 3 Télévision (FR3), 1984 (The Studio Bettenfeld-Rosenblum, report France 3 TV).
- La Collection Bettenfeld-Rosenblum, 2000 Motifs et Ornements, Masahiro Miyamoto, Éditions Gakken, 1987 (Collection Bettenfeld-Rosenblum, 2000 Patterns andornaments, 1987).
- Bookbinders' Finishing Tool Makers 1780-1965, Tom Conroy, Éditions Oak Knoll Press, 2002.
- Arts & Métiers du Livre, Les trésors de l'Atelier Bettenfeld-Rosenblum, N°199, September–October 1996, Page 49 à 51, Article de Raymond Faivre.
- Arts & Métiers du Livre, Disparition de Bernard ROSENBLUM, N°260, Juin-Juillet 2007, Page 18.
- Aladin, Décès d'un Grand Artisan, N°226, 2007, Page 6.
