= Jonathan Rosenblum (activist) =

Labor activist (born 1961)

Jonathan Rosenblum (born 1961) is a community and labor activist, writer and a union and community organizer based in Seattle, WA.

== Career ==
Rosenblum was Editor-in-Chief of the Cornell Daily Sun his senior undergraduate year 1982-83, and graduated Cornell University with a Bachelor of Arts degree in 1983. He began labor and community organizing later in the 1980s, after his involvement with The Ithaca Journal in upstate New York. He eventually moved to Seattle in 1991 and helped found the Washington State chapter of Jobs With Justice, a labor, faith, student and community coalition. From 1996 to 1997, he worked as an organizer on the Union Cities Campaign for the King County Labor Council and AFL–CIO. Following this campaign, Rosenblum staffed the initial effort to organize contract technology employees which turned in to WashTech (CWA 37083 WashTech). From 1997 to 2001, Rosenblum was Director of the Seattle Union Now (SUN) program at the AFL–CIO, which included work on graduate student employee unionization at University of Washington. As a result of his role at SUN, Rosenblum was closely involved in labor's preparations for the 1999 Seattle WTO protests. Rosenblum played an active role in helping to create a coalition between SUN and Direct Action Network, environmentalists, international activists and students.

From 2011 to 2014, Rosenblum was the campaign director for Service Employees International Union during the $15 minimum wage initiative at the Seattle-Tacoma International Airport. During his labor organizing work in Seattle, he became a colleague of civil rights, labor and peace activist Lonnie Nelson, who helped to recruit workers at a daycare center to SEIU membership.

He authored Beyond $15: Immigrant Workers, Faith Activists, and the Revival of the Labor Movement, published by Beacon Press in March 2017.

== Selected works ==
- "Resisting Amazon Is Not Futile" (5 December 2020) Jacobin
- "Socialist Win in Seattle: Anomaly or Harbinger?" (16 January 2016) Alternet
- "To Fight Back Against Companies Like Uber, Workers Need Organizing—Not Technocratic Fixes" (19 January 2016) In These Times
- "The Battle in Seattle, 15 Years On: How an Unsung Hero Kept the Movements United" (1 December 2014) Yes! (U.S. magazine)
- "SeaTac's Fight for 15: Why Faith Was Key" (9 June 2016) Labor Notes
- "Coon Lake's name is changed, but lots of work remains on institutional racism" (13 November 2015) Seattle Times
