= Susan Rosenbloom =

British choreographer and artist

Susan Rosenbloom (February 26, 1958 – May 31, 2015) was a choreographer, artistic director, teacher, and poet from the UK.
