= Bert Rosenbloom =

American business professor and author

Bert Rosenbloom is an American business professor and author, currently the J. Ronald Rauth Chair of Marketing Management at Bennett S. LeBow College of Business, Drexel University.
