= Steve Rosenbloom =

American football executive (born 1944)

Personal information
- Born: November 23, 1944 (age 81); Atlantic City, New Jersey, U.S.

Career information
- College: Georgetown University

Career history
- Baltimore Colts (1967–1968) Business manager; Baltimore Colts (1969–1970) Assistant to the president; Baltimore Colts (1971–1972) President; Los Angeles Rams (1974–1978) Assistant to the president; Los Angeles Rams (1979) Executive vice president; New Orleans Saints (1980) General manager
- Executive profile at Pro Football Reference

Steve Rosenbloom (born November 23, 1944) is an American former professional football executive who served as president of the Baltimore Colts and Los Angeles Rams and general manager of the New Orleans Saints.

== Baltimore Colts ==
The son of Baltimore Colts owner Carroll Rosenbloom, Rosenbloom began his involvement with the team at the age of 12 as an equipment assistant. He became a publicity assistant at the age of 17 and then worked in the front office under general manager Red Kellett. After he graduated from Georgetown University in 1967, Rosenbloom became the Colts' business manager. In 1969 he became the assistant to the team president. On March 18, 1971, he succeeded his father as team president.

== Los Angeles Rams ==
The elder Rosenbloom swapped franchises with Los Angeles Rams owner Robert Irsay in 1972, but Steve Rosenbloom remained with the Colts for a year before joining the Rams. Carroll Rosenbloom drowned on April 2, 1979. In order to take advantage of the widows' tax exemption, he left 70% of the team to his wife, Georgia, and divided the remaining 30% between his five children. Rosenbloom took over as operating head of the Rams, but was fired by his stepmother on August 17, 1979, due to conflicts between him and general manager Don Klosterman.

== New Orleans Saints ==
In December 1979, Rosenbloom was named general manager of the New Orleans Saints. He resigned on January 20, 1981, after owner John W. Mecom Jr. unilaterally hired Bum Phillips as head coach.

== Post-NFL career ==
After leaving the Saints, Rosenbloom remained in New Orleans and has worked in real estate and investing and owned an oil equipment business. In 1991 he moved to Covington, Louisiana.
