= Carroll Rosenbloom =

American football player, owner (1907–1979)

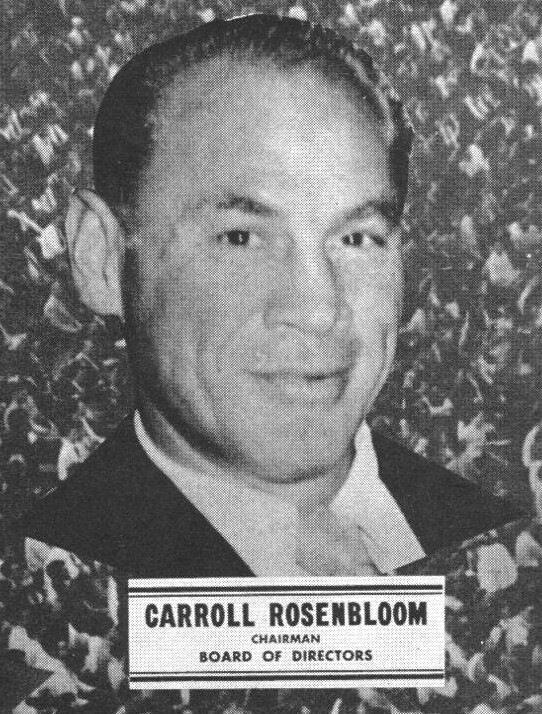
- Rosenbloom, c. 1953
- Born: Dale Carroll Rosenbloom; March 5, 1907; Baltimore, Maryland, U.S.
- Died: April 2, 1979 (aged 72); Golden Beach, Florida, U.S.
- Occupation: Businessman
- Known for: Owner of the Baltimore Colts and Los Angeles Rams
- Spouse(s): Velma Anderson (divorced) Georgia Frontiere (m. 1966)
- Children: 5, including Steve Rosenbloom and Chip Rosenbloom

Dale Carroll Rosenbloom (March 5, 1907 – April 2, 1979) was an American businessman. He was the owner of two National Football League (NFL) franchises: he was the first owner of the Baltimore Colts and later switched teams, taking ownership of the Los Angeles Rams in 1972.

During his stewardship of both franchises, Rosenbloom amassed the best ownership winning percentage in league history (.660), a total regular season record of 226 wins, 116 losses and 8 ties, as well as 3 NFL championships (1958, 1959, 1968), and one Super Bowl (V).

Rosenbloom has been described as the NFL's first modern owner and the first players' owner. Rosenbloom was part of the NFL inner circle that negotiated the league's network TV contracts with NBC and CBS and the AFL–NFL merger, both of which contributed to professional football becoming both profitable and the most watched spectator sport in the United States.

== Early life and education ==
Born Dale Carroll Rosenbloom in Baltimore, Maryland, to Anna and Solomon Rosenbloom, he was the eighth of nine children, raised in a Jewish family. His father, an immigrant from Russian Poland, started a successful work-clothing manufacturing company.

As a youth, Sports Illustrated described Rosenbloom as an "indifferent student" but a "good athlete," and competed in football, baseball, and boxing.

Rosenbloom graduated from Baltimore City College in 1926 then later that year attended the University of Pennsylvania in Philadelphia, where he studied psychology and business and was a two-year letterman as a halfback on the football team in 1927 and 1928. At the time, the Quakers' backfield coach was Bert Bell, who became the commissioner of the NFL in 1946.

== Business career ==
Upon graduation, Rosenbloom returned to Baltimore to work for his father's clothing company. After being sent to liquidate the Blue Ridge Overalls Company, a small factory his father had acquired, Rosenbloom decided he wanted to run the fledgling company on his own. Based in Roanoke, Virginia, Blue Ridge had suffered during the Depression. But Rosenbloom was intent to turn it around. When the U.S. Civilian Conservation Corps was authorized in 1933 and officials needed denim work clothes, Rosenbloom successfully secured Blue Ridge a large order.

By 1940, after attaining distribution through large channels like Sears-Roebuck and J.C. Penney, Blue Ridge had grown into a prosperous company allowing Rosenbloom to retire at 32. (As a youth, Rosenbloom told his brother Ben he planned to retire at 34.) During a brief retirement, Rosenbloom lived as a gentleman farmer on Maryland's Eastern Shore, growing corn and peaches. As well, during this time, Rosenbloom married Velma Anderson.

Rosenbloom's father's death in 1942 cut his retirement short, however. When Rosenbloom was named the executor of his father's estate, he chose to return to business life.

By 1959, Blue Ridge had grown to include almost a dozen shirt and overall companies and 7,000 employees, leading some to dub Rosenbloom "America's Overalls King." In the financial interests of his family, Rosenbloom decided to sell the company to P & R, the price being $7 million in cash and more than $20 million in stock. At P & R, Rosenbloom served as a director.

With the success of his first enterprise, Rosenbloom diversified his business interests. In the late 1950s, Rosenbloom and his partners bought control of Universal Products Co. He went on to buy American Totalisator and other small companies, eventually lumping them all together under the name Universal Controls, Inc.

Rosenbloom was one of the largest individual shareholders in Seven Arts Productions Limited, which backed the Broadway musical Funny Girl, and the films Lolita, What Ever Happened to Baby Jane?, and The Night of the Iguana.

== National Football League ==
=== Baltimore Colts (1953–1971) ===
Carroll Rosenbloom in a 1958 newspaper caricature.

After losing the original Colts team after the 1950 season, the city of Baltimore petitioned the NFL for another franchise. Around this time, NFL Commissioner Bert Bell wanted to find a new home for the Dallas Texans, an NFL expansion team that folded after one failed season in 1952. Bell sought a competitive new owner with financial resources. From their days together at Penn, Bell thought that Rosenbloom would be a great fit. Although Rosenbloom was hesitant at first to own a franchise, he relented and bought the team, along with a group of other investors. Rosenbloom's share cost him $13,000. In January 1953, the NFL awarded the city of Baltimore the franchise, with Rosenbloom as the principal owner.

Adopting the nickname of the city's earlier professional incarnation, the Colts, Rosenbloom asked fans to give him five years to create a winning team.

Before their first season, Rosenbloom helped organize one of the biggest trades in sports history: in exchange for ten Cleveland Browns, the Colts traded five players. Among the players traded to Baltimore were Don Shula, Art Spinney, Bert Rechichar, Carl Taseff, Ed Sharkey, Gern Nagler, Harry Agganis, Dick Batten, Stu Sheets, and Elmer Willhoite.

In 1954, the Colts hired Weeb Ewbank as head coach. Ewbank led the Colts for nine seasons and won two conference and NFL Championships with the help of 1956 free agent quarterback Johnny Unitas.

On November 30, 1958, the Colts clinched their first Western Conference title. Four weeks later, the team won its first NFL Championship, beating the New York Giants 23–17 at Yankee Stadium in what is regarded as "The Greatest Game Ever Played," six years after Rosenbloom purchased the team. The televised game, a sudden death thriller, served as a launching point for the start of the NFL's enormous boom in popularity.

The Colts repeated as champions in 1959, again defeating the Giants, 31–16, for the NFL Championship before a home crowd at Baltimore's Memorial Stadium. During the next three seasons, the Colts struggled and Green Bay won the division. In January 1963, Rosenbloom let go of Coach Ewbank and hired former player Don Shula, then the youngest coach in NFL history at age 33.

Over the next several seasons the team did not win another championship but did make it to the NFL Championship game in 1964, losing to the Cleveland Browns 27–0, and to Super Bowl III following the 1968 season, again to lose, this time to the underdog New York Jets, 16–7 (the Jets were coached by Ewbank). (The AFL–NFL Championship Game was retroactively renamed Super Bowl in 1966 prior to the AFL-NFL merger of 1970.)

After the 1969 season, Shula left Baltimore for Miami after Dolphins owner Joe Robbie tempted Shula with about $750,000 and other perks. Rosenbloom was furious and successfully argued that Miami had tampered with Shula. Because of the infraction, the NFL awarded Baltimore with Miami's 1971 first-round draft choice.

Following the 1970 season on January 17, 1971, the Colts won a fourth league title, defeating the Dallas Cowboys 16–13 in Super Bowl V in Miami.

A fierce competitor, Rosenbloom had a profound interest in his team succeeding. Describing his commitment to the Colts and his experience running a franchise, Rosenbloom told Sports Illustrated magazine:

"After the first year in football, I found that of all the things I've ever done, this is the thing. There is nothing more rewarding. You have everything wrapped up in one bundle. You meet much nicer people than you do in business. You meet the public, and you must learn to look out for them. There's no place where your word is more your bond than in sports. You'd never find 14 men who deal as fairly with one another as the 14 owners in the National Football League, particularly after some of the things that have gone on in business or on Wall Street. You play a part in the lives of young men, and you help them grow. And then every Sunday you have the great pleasure of dying."

However, while Rosenbloom loved the Colts, due to issues with Memorial Stadium and the city's officials, Rosenbloom wanted to leave Baltimore. In the next offseason in 1972, Rosenbloom completed a historic tax-free swapping of teams with new Los Angeles Rams owner Robert Irsay. When Rosenbloom left, he received recognition from his players. Colts linebacker Mike Curtis said, "I hate to see Carroll go. He was a damn good owner. It wasn't the coaches who made Baltimore a winner for 14 years."

=== Los Angeles Rams (1972–1979) ===
Prior to the 1972 season, Rosenbloom assumed control as the majority owner of the Rams.

The Rams remained solid contenders in the 1970s, winning seven straight NFC West division titles between 1973 and 1979. Though a strong team, the Rams lost the first four conference championship games they played in that decade, twice to Minnesota (1974, 1976) and twice to Dallas (1975, 1978) and failed to advance to a Super Bowl.

In 1978, Rosenbloom announced plans to move the Rams to Anaheim Stadium in Orange County, citing dissatisfaction with the Los Angeles Coliseum and the location as the motives behind the move. (The move eventually occurred in 1980, over a year after Rosenbloom's death. The extra time was needed to retrofit the venue, which opened in 1966 for the California Angels, from a baseball-only facility into a multi-purpose stadium.) Rosenbloom hired the Kerlan Jobe Sports Medicine Group to manage the health of his players. He befriended Dr. Toby Freedman as his contact within the Medical Group and family physician.

== Death and ensuing controversy ==
While swimming at Golden Beach, Florida, Rosenbloom drowned on April 2, 1979, at age 72. An unsigned eulogy by the editors in the respected Los Angeles-based annual Petersen's Pro Football indicated that windy weather had forced the cancellation of a planned morning tennis match, and moved Rosenbloom to swim in the ocean as an alternative form of daily exercise; he had subsequently perished in the surf.

Though Dr. Joseph H. Davis, the Dade County coroner, stated, "there is not one scintilla of reason to believe this is anything other than an unfortunate accident," a PBS Frontline documentary called "An Unauthorized History of the NFL" suggested that Rosenbloom, a known gambler, may have been murdered. Son Steve Rosenbloom stated that his father was a poor swimmer who never went into water alone, telling Frontline "If he went out alone that day, he was breaking a habit of a lifetime."

The final conclusion was that Carroll, who had been one of the first heart bypass patients, had suffered a heart attack while swimming. Witnesses at the scene and the Miami coroner's office and the Miami chief of police confirmed this finding.

After Rosenbloom's death, his second wife, Georgia Frontiere, inherited a 70% ownership stake in the Los Angeles Rams. Rosenbloom's five children inherited the other 30% in the form of equal 6% shares. Rosenbloom's stepson Steve assumed primary owners' functions on an interim basis.

Frontiere's inheritance came as a surprise to many fans, who thought Steve Rosenbloom, a Rams' vice-president, would assume ownership. The actual outcome was not a surprise to close friends and family, however, as Rosenbloom was trying to take advantage of the widow's tax exemption. A draft change of Rosenbloom's will leaving the team to Steve was never executed.

Over 900 people attended Rosenbloom's memorial service, including 15 NFL owners, sportscaster Howard Cosell, the entire Rams organization and actors Warren Beatty, Kirk Douglas, Cary Grant, Jimmy Stewart, Rod Steiger, and Henry Mancini.

== Influence on the NFL ==
Rosenbloom influenced the modern day NFL in many ways, mainly in that he envisioned that the league could be a successful business. In 1960, the NFL owners were deadlocked about naming a successor to Commissioner Bell. After reviewing 23 ballots, Rosenbloom brought up the name of Los Angeles Rams general manager Pete Rozelle as a compromise candidate because he had successfully made the Rams profitable.

At the age of 33, Rozelle was elected commissioner. Rozelle, with the help of Rosenbloom, would spearhead equal revenue sharing of all TV contracts among the 12 league franchises, which helped make the league profitable and caused football to surpass baseball as the most watched spectator sport in the US by the time of his departure from the post in 1989.

Upon Rosenbloom's death, Rozelle said, "Carroll Rosenbloom played a major role in the growth and success of the NFL, both through the teams he produced and through his active participation in the league's decision making process."

Rosenbloom was also influential in making the AFL-NFL merger possible. He helped push the merger forward in 1970 by taking $3 million and agreeing to move the Colts to the American Football Conference (along with the Browns and Steelers). He was also the NFL's first visible owner and its first players' owner, and envisioned revenue-generating stadiums and luxury suites before anyone else did.

== Awards and recognition ==
In 1960, the City of Baltimore awarded Rosenbloom the "Man of the Year Award."

Since his death, the Rams' players and coaches give the Carroll Rosenbloom Memorial Award to the team's rookie of the year.

Rosenbloom was elected to the Rams' Ring of Honor.

== Personal life ==
Rosenbloom was married to Velma Anderson, his first wife, when he met his second wife, 20 years his junior, who was also married, at a party hosted by his friend Joseph Kennedy at his Palm Beach estate in 1957. Rosenbloom met seven-times-married former lounge singer Georgia Frontiere, then a TV personality in Miami. Rosenbloom and Frontiere married in 1966, though they had been together for eight years and had two children together. When Rosenbloom died, Frontiere and his five children (Dan Rosenbloom, Steve Rosenbloom, and Suzanne Rosenbloom Irwin, from his first wife, and Lucia Rosenbloom Rodriguez and Chip Rosenbloom with Frontiere) survived him. His granddaughter (daughter of Suzanne) is married to Breck Eisner, son of Disney executive Michael Eisner.

Sporting positions
Preceded by Robert Irsay	Los Angeles Rams owner 1972–1979	Succeeded by Georgia Frontiere
First	Baltimore Colts owner 1957–1972	Succeeded by Robert Irsay
