= Dick Contino =

American accordionist, singer, and actor (1930–2017)

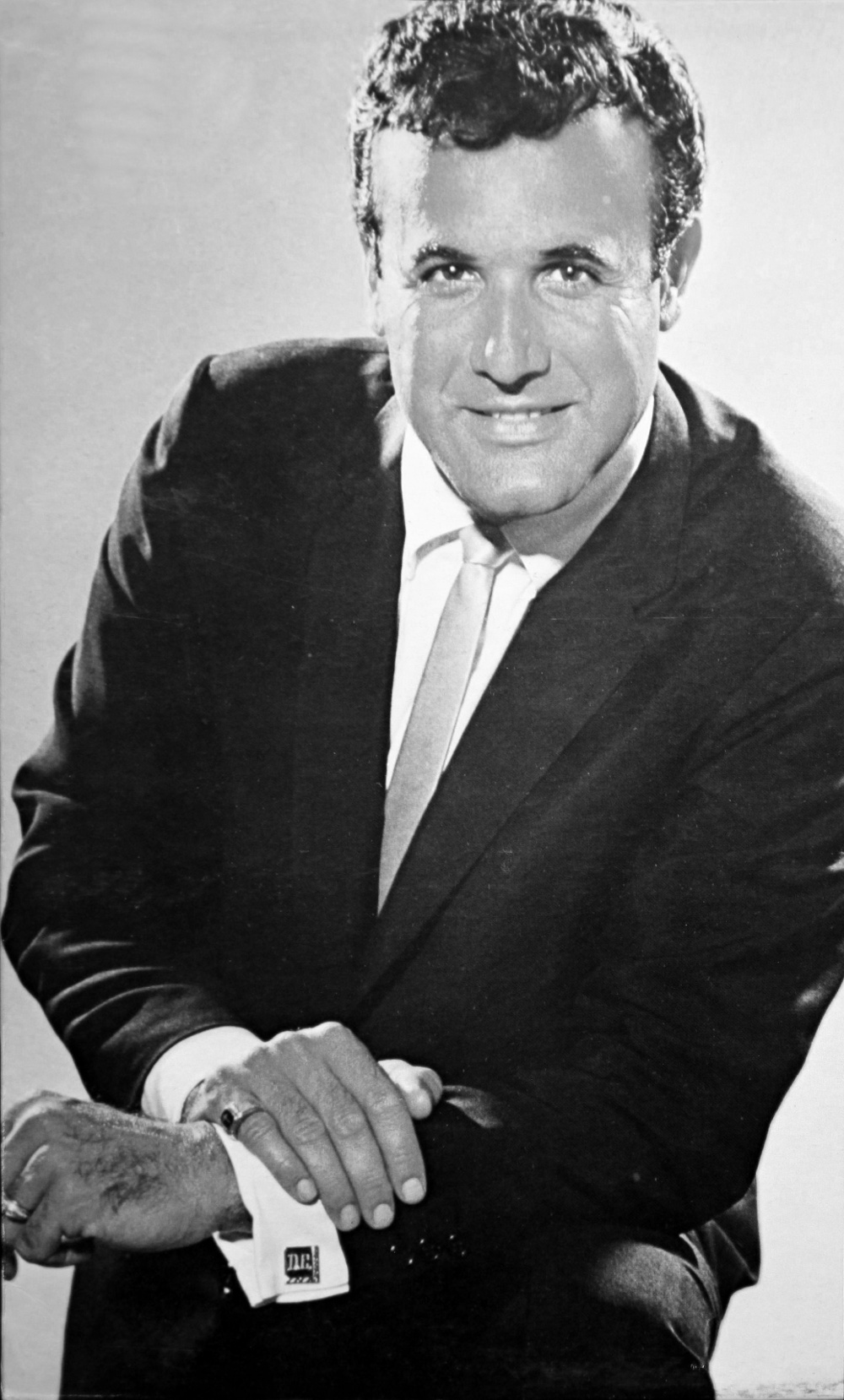
- Contino, 1965

Background information
- Born: January 17, 1930; Fresno, California, U.S.
- Died: April 19, 2017 (aged 87) Fresno, California, U.S.
- Occupations: Musician; singer; actor
- Instruments: Accordion; vocals

Richard Joseph "Dick" Contino (January 17, 1930 – April 19, 2017) was an American accordionist and singer.

== Early life ==
Contino was born in Fresno, California. He was the son of Mr. and Mrs. Peter Contino, and he attended Fresno High School. He studied accordion primarily with San Francisco-based Angelo Cognazzo, and occasionally with Los Angeles-based Guido Deiro. At the age of about 6 or 7 years old he exhibited great virtuosity on the instrument.

Although he graduated from Fresno High School in 1947 and enrolled at Fresno State College, he was unable to concentrate on his studies. Contino explained, "I enjoyed college, but while attending classes I kept thinking that if I was going to be a success, it would be my music that would take me there." He also played piano, clarinet, and saxophone.

== Early career ==
Contino got his big break on December 7, 1947, at age 17, when he played "Lady of Spain" (his signature piece) and won first place in the Horace Heidt/Philip Morris talent contest in Fresno, which was broadcast on national radio. Contino also won first place in subsequent competitions in Los Angeles, Omaha, Des Moines, Youngstown, Cleveland, Pittsburgh, Harrisburg, and New York City. He won first place in the final round on December 12, 1948, in Washington, D.C. In 1949 he had a hit album,Dick Contino, which reached No. 3 on the Billboard Top LPs.

Contino made many recordings from the latter 1940s to the early 1960s, particularly for Mercury Records and Dot Records. Eddie Fisher had much better success with Contino's "Lady of Spain" in 1952. Contino's song "Yours" was his first hit single. The song reached #27 on the U.S. pop charts in 1954. His second and only other hit single was "Pledge My Love." It reached #42 on the U.S. pop charts in 1957.

Contino toured with the Horace Heidt Orchestra and was billed as the "world's greatest accordion player." He appeared on The Ed Sullivan Show a record 48 times.

== Military service ==
Contino's career was interrupted when he was drafted during the Korean War. He fled from pre-induction barracks at Fort Ord out of extreme, unpublicized phobias and neuroses. In 1951, he pled guilty to evasion and was sentenced to serve six months at McNeil Island Corrections Center.

He was inducted into the army in 1952, having served four and a half months of his sentence. He was honorably discharged with the rank of staff sergeant. Although he received a presidential pardon, the scandal dealt Contino's career a serious blow. He continued to perform, and acted in a few movies in the 1950s and 1960s.

== Later career ==
Contino's acting became known to a new generation in 1991, when Daddy-O, a low-budget 1958 movie in which he starred as a faddishly-dressed beat rebel and singer, was shown on a third-season episode of Mystery Science Theater 3000. The show also riffed the 1959 film Girls Town, in which Contino appeared with other musical performers, such as Paul Anka and The Platters.

He continued to perform regularly throughout the United States. His repertoire was eclectic, ranging from Italian songs such as "Come Back to Sorrento" and "Arrivederci Roma" to standards like "Lady of Spain" and "Swinging on a Star".

== Personal life ==
Contino was married to Leigh Snowden for 26 years. They had three children together. Then married to Tonia Cannavino for 23 years. They lived in Las Vegas.

== Novella and other fictional works ==
James Ellroy wrote a novella, Dick Contino's Blues, which is a mini-memoir and crime story based on Contino's experiences as a struggling artist after the war. It is included in the 1994 Ellroy short story collection Hollywood Nocturnes. A version appeared in issue number 46 of Granta magazine (Winter 1994) along with several photographs of Contino and the author.Ellroy also penned a short story entitled Hollywood Shakedown, which appears in his collected work Crime Wave and features Contino as the central character.

The story was entirely fictitious, as it features numerous incidents of violence and murder which Contino had never been linked with or accused of in reality.

He appeared briefly in Ellroy's American Tabloid, the first book of his Underworld USA Trilogy, performing at a mafia-financed Cuban exile military training camp ("Contino played 'Lady Of Spain' six thousand times.").

In 2012, a biography of Contino's life, The Beauty of Imperfection, was published.

== Death ==
Contino died on April 19, 2017, in Fresno, at the age of 87.
