= Fred Otash =

American private investigator (1922–1992)

Fred Otash (January 7, 1922 – October 5, 1992) was a Los Angeles police officer, private investigator, author, and a WWII Marine veteran, who became known as a Hollywood fixer, while operating as its "most infamous" private detective; he is most remembered as "the inspiration for Jack Nicholson's character Jake Gittes in the film, Chinatown, and by name as a fictionalized narrator in several books by author James Ellroy. He was interviewed numerous times in the media, including in 1957 by Mike Wallace, an interview that can be viewed online via the University of Texas.

== Early life and family ==
Fred Otash was the youngest of six children born to Lebanese immigrants Habib Otash and Marian Jabour; his siblings were: Evelyn Abisalih, Grace Steiner, Selma Otash, Lila Merhige, and one brother, Mitchell.

== Career ==
Otash worked for Hollywood Research Incorporated, which did business with the tabloid magazine Confidential. He is also known for being hired by Peter Lawford to investigate Marilyn Monroe. An FBI file released as part of the JFK Assassination Records suggest that Otash was investigating Lawford and John F. Kennedy, and attempted to talk a call girl into arranging a meeting with Kennedy in which she would wear a wire to record incriminating statements.

== Personal life ==
On January 6, 1950, Otash married film actress Doris Houck, at the Beverly Hills courthouse. They were divorced twice: the first order was vacated following a November 1950 reconciliation, and their final divorce was granted June 19, 1952. He maintained residences at the Jockey Club, in Miami, Florida, and in Cannes, France. Otash suffered from emphysema and high blood pressure.

== Death ==
Otash died at the age of 70, on October 5, 1992, at his West Hollywood home. He was survived by his daughter, Colleen Gabrielle Otash.

== Legacy ==
Otash wrote about his life in his memoir, Investigation Hollywood: Memoirs of Hollywood's Top Private Detective.

The 1974 film Chinatown's main character, played by Jack Nicholson, was also based in part on Fred Otash.

Author James Ellroy has used a fictionalized version of Fred Otash in all three of the novels in his Underworld USA Trilogy; Otash appears in The Cold Six Thousand and Blood's a Rover. Otash is also the main character in the sordid, fictional Ellroy novella, Shakedown, which Ellroy was in development with for HBO, in 2013. In 2021, Ellroy published a full-length novel narrated by the fictional Otash, Widespread Panic. It was followed in 2023 by a sequel, The Enchanters, and another in 2026, Red Sheet.
