= Sam Giancana =

American mobster (1908–1975)

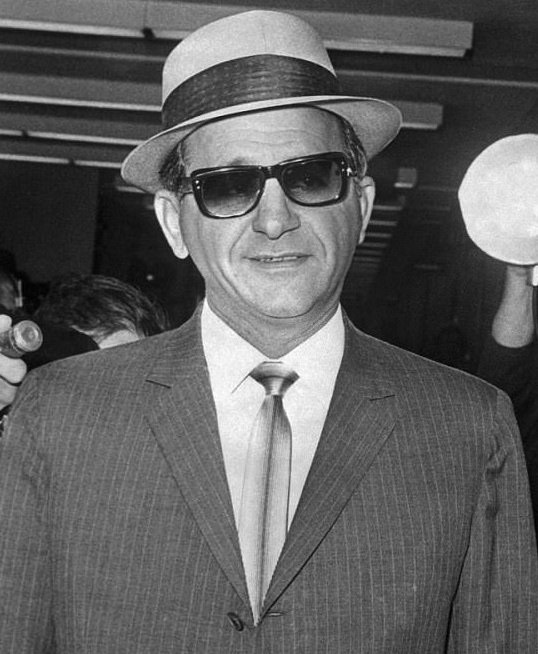
- Giancana in 1965
- Born: Gilormo Giangana (Note: Gilormo Giangana is the birth name according to the Chicago Bureau of Vital Statistics, Birth Certificate Number 5915; however, Momo Salvatore Giancana (Italian: [ˈmɔːmo salvaˈtoːre dʒaŋˈkaːna]) is the birth name according to Birth Register Certificate Number 1191.); May 24, 1908 (Note: May 24, 1908, is the birth date according to the Chicago Bureau of Vital Statistics, Birth Certificate Number 5915; however, June 15, 1908, is the birth date according to Birth Register Certificate Number 1191, and the birth date Giancana celebrated.); Chicago, Illinois, U.S.
- Died: June 19, 1975 (aged 67); Oak Park, Illinois, U.S.
- Cause of death: Multiple gunshot wounds
- Resting place: Mount Carmel Cemetery, Hillside, Illinois, U.S.
- Other names: "Mooney" "Momo"; Salvatore Giancana
- Occupation: Crime boss
- Spouse: Angeline DeTolve (m. 1933; died 1954)
- Children: 3
- Allegiance: Chicago Outfit
- Convictions: Burglary, larceny (1929); Bootlegging (1939); Contempt of court (1965)
- Penalty: 1 to 5 years' imprisonment; 3 years served (1929); 4 years' imprisonment; 3 years served (1939); 1 year's imprisonment (1965)

Salvatore "Mooney" Giancana (/ˌdʒiɑːnˈkɑːnə/ JEE-ahn-KAH-nə; born Gilormo Giangana, Italian: [dʒiˈlɔrmo dʒaŋˈɡaːna]; May 24, 1908 – June 19, 1975) was an American mobster who was boss of the Chicago Outfit from 1957 to 1966.

Giancana was born in Chicago to Italian immigrant parents. He joined the 42 Gang as a teenager, developing a reputation in organized crime, which gained him the notice of the leaders of the Chicago Outfit, which he joined during the late 1930s. From the 1940s through the 1950s, he controlled illegal gambling, illegal liquor distribution, and political rackets in Louisiana. In the early 1940s, Giancana was involved in a takeover of Chicago's black American lottery payout system for the Outfit. In 1957, he became the boss of the Chicago Outfit.

According to some sources, Giancana and the Mafia were involved in John F. Kennedy's victory in the 1960 presidential election. During the 1960s, he was recruited by the Central Intelligence Agency (CIA) in a plot to assassinate Cuban leader Fidel Castro. In 1965, Giancana was convicted of contempt of court, serving one year in prison. After his release from prison, Giancana fled to Cuernavaca, Mexico. In 1974, he was deported to the United States, returning to Chicago. Giancana was murdered on June 19, 1975, at his home in Oak Park, Illinois, shortly before he was scheduled to appear before the Church Committee.

== Early life ==
Giancana was born Gilormo Giangana on May 24, 1908, in The Patch neighborhood of Chicago to Antonio Giangana and Antonia DeSimone, (Note: Antonino Giangana and Antonia DiSimonna are the names according to the Chicago Bureau of Vital Statistics, Birth Certificate Number 5915; however, Antonio Giancana and Antonia DiSimone are the names according to Birth Register Certificate Number 1191.) Italian immigrants from Partanna and Castelvetrano, Sicily. His father immigrated in 1905, while his mother immigrated in 1906; he had seven siblings. Antonia died in 1910 and his father married Mary Leonardi.

== Criminal career ==
Giancana joined the 42 Gang, a juvenile street crew working for political boss Joseph Esposito. The 42 Gang's name was a reference to Ali Baba and the 40 Thieves. They thought they were one better, hence 42. Giancana soon developed a reputation as an excellent getaway driver, a high earner, and a vicious killer. After Esposito's murder, in which Giancana was allegedly involved, the 42 Gang was transformed into a de facto extension of the Chicago Outfit with leaders such as Frank "the Enforcer" Nitti, Paul "the Waiter" Ricca, and Tony "Joe Batters" Accardo. He was first arrested in 1925 for auto theft. He soon graduated to "triggerman", and by the age of 20 had been the prime subject of three murder investigations but never tried for any of them. In 1929, Giancana was convicted of burglary and larceny, and sentenced to one to five years in the Joliet Correctional Center. He was released in 1932 after serving three years and nine months.

During the late 1930s, Giancana became the first 42er to join the Chicago Outfit. From the early 1940s through the 1950s, he controlled most illegal gambling, liquor distribution, and other political rackets in Louisiana, through longtime friend H. A. (Hol) Killian. Killian controlled the majority of the liquor license issuance by his associations with longtime New Orleans business associate Carlos Marcello. In 1939, Giancana was convicted of bootlegging and sentenced to four years in Leavenworth Prison and Terre Haute Federal Correctional Complex.

=== Rise to power ===
After his release from prison in 1942, Giancana made a name for himself by convincing Accardo, then the Outfit's underboss, to stage a takeover of Chicago's African American "policy" (lottery) payout system for the Outfit. Giancana's crew is believed to have convinced Eddie Jones to quit his racket and leave the country. Giancana's crew was also responsible for the August 4, 1952, murder of African American gambling boss Theodore Roe. Jones and Roe were major South Side gambling bosses. Roe had refused to surrender control of his operation as the Outfit had demanded, and on June 19, 1951, Roe fatally shot Leonard "Fat Lennie" Caifano, a made man of Giancana's crew.

The Outfit's South Side "policy"-game takeover was not complete until another Outfit member, Jackie "the Lackey" Cerone, scared "Big Jim" Martin to Mexico with two bullets to the head that did not kill him. When the lottery money started rolling in for the Outfit after this gambling war, the amount this game produced for the Outfit was in the millions of dollars a year, bringing Giancana further notice. It is believed to have been a major factor in his being "anointed" as the Outfit's new boss in 1957. Accardo joined Ricca in semi-retirement, becoming the Outfit's consigliere. However, it was generally understood that Accardo and Ricca still had the real power. Giancana was required to consult Accardo and Ricca on all important Outfit affairs.

Giancana was present at the Mafia's 1957 Apalachin meeting at the Upstate New York estate of Joseph Barbara. When the meeting was stumbled upon by the police many were arrested but Giancana escaped. He avoided arrest by staying inside the meeting house instead of fleeing like many others. Later, Buffalo crime boss Stefano Magaddino and Giancana were overheard on a wiretap saying the meeting should have occurred in the Chicago area. Giancana claimed that the Chicago area was "the safest place in the world" for a major underworld meeting because he had several police chiefs on his payroll. If the syndicate ever wanted to hold a meeting in or around Chicago, Giancana said, they had nothing to fear because they had the area "locked up tight".

Hyman Larner was an associate of Giancana's who helped expand the Outfit's gambling and smuggling operations to Panama and Iran, moving the Miami operation's headquarters to Panama where money laundering was more easily facilitated by local banks. These operations were conducted as a partnership between the Mafia and the CIA. By 1966, this partnership had developed into arms smuggling to the Middle East for the Israeli Mossad, all via Panama. Richard Cain, a corrupt police officer, also made "frequent trips" to and from Mexico as Giancana's courier and financial adviser.

In 1959 Giancana appeared before the Select Committee on Improper Activities in Labor and Management, where he was questioned by Chief Counsel Bobby Kennedy. Under questioning Giancana started laughing, in response Kennedy chided that "I thought only little girls giggled, Mr. Giancana".

=== 1960 Presidential election ===
Some journalists claimed that Giancana and his Chicago crime syndicate "played a role" in John F. Kennedy's victory in the 1960 presidential election. In the book Double Cross by Chuck Giancana, the half-brother of Giancana claimed Giancana said “I help get Jack elected and, in return, he calls off the heat". The lawyer Robert J. McDonnell, who became the son-in-law of Giancana, told journalist Seymour Hersh that at the request of judge William J. Tuohy he helped set up a meeting between Joseph P. Kennedy Sr. and Giancana. Sinatra's daughter Tina told Hersh a similar story, that through her father Kennedy set up a meeting with Giancana.

Giancana's mistress Judith Exner and Frank Sinatra's daughter Tina Sinatra both stated that Giancana used his connections to persuade unions to support Kennedy. According to Exner, Giancana bragged to her that Kennedy would never have been elected without him. However, it is alleged that Giancana came to regret aiding Kennedy get elected due to the fact that attorney general Robert F. Kennedy made significant efforts to crack down on organized crime. Frank Ragano, lawyer for Florida mob boss Santo Trafficante Jr., stated that Giancana complained to his client that "We broke our balls for him and gave him the election, and he gets his brother to hound us to death".

=== CIA connections ===
It was publicly reported during the course of the Church Committee hearings that during the Kennedy administration, the CIA recruited Giancana and other mobsters to assassinate Fidel Castro. Giancana reportedly said that the CIA and Cosa Nostra were "different sides of the same coin".

Judith Exner claimed to be the mistress of both Giancana and JFK, and that she delivered communications between them about Castro. Giancana's daughter Antoinette has stated that her father was performing a scam to pocket millions of CIA dollars.

Documents released in 1997 revealed that some Mafiosi worked with the CIA on assassination attempts against Castro. CIA documents released in 2007 confirmed that in September 1960, the CIA recruited ex-FBI agent Robert Maheu to meet with the West Coast representative of the Chicago mob, Johnny Roselli. When Maheu contacted Roselli, Maheu hid that he was sent by the CIA, instead portraying himself as an advocate for international corporations. He offered $150,000 to have Castro killed, but Roselli refused any pay. Roselli introduced Maheu to two men he called Sam Gold and Joe. "Sam Gold" was Giancana; "Joe" was Santo Trafficante Jr., the Tampa syndicate boss and one of the most powerful mobsters in prerevolution Cuba. Glenn Kessler of The Washington Post explained: "After Fidel Castro led a revolution that toppled the government of Fulgencio Batista in 1959, CIA was desperate to eliminate Castro. So, the agency sought out a partner equally worried about Castro—the Mafia, which had lucrative investments in Cuban casinos." Giancana detested Castro, according to his daughter, Antoinette, when she once expressed admiration for Castro her father erupted in anger, calling him a "syphilitic bastard" and asking "do you have any idea what he's done to me ... to our friends?"

According to the declassified CIA "Family Jewels" documents, Giancana and Trafficante were contacted in September 1960 about the possibility of an assassination attempt by Maheu after Maheu had contacted Roselli, a Mafia member in Las Vegas and Giancana's number-two man. Maheu had presented himself as a representative of numerous international businesses in Cuba that Castro was expropriating. He offered $150,000 for the "removal" of Castro through this operation, though the documents suggest that neither Roselli, Giancana, nor Trafficante accepted any payment for the job. Giancana suggested using poison pills to dose Castro's food and drink. The CIA gave these pills to Giancana's nominee, Juan Orta, whom Giancana presented as a corrupt official in the new Cuban government and who had access to Castro. After six attempts to introduce the poison into Castro's food, Orta abruptly demanded to be relieved of his role in the mission, giving the job to another, unnamed participant. Later, Giancana and Trafficante made a second attempt using Tony Verona, the commander of the Cuban Exile Junta, who had, according to Trafficante, become "disaffected with the apparent ineffectual progress of the Junta." Verona requested $10,000 in expenses and $1,000 worth of communications equipment. How much work was performed for the second attempt is unknown, as the program was canceled soon after due to the Bay of Pigs invasion in April 1961. The CIA-Mafia plots were divided into two phases, the first lasted from August 1960 till May 1961, and the second from April 1962 till February 1963. Giancana and Trafficante were excluded from phase two, although Roselli was not.

In October 1961 Giancana asked Maheu to wire the room of his then mistress Phyllis McGuire, singer of the McGuire Sisters, whom he suspected of having an affair with comedian Dan Rowan. Although Maheu acquiesced, the device was not planted because the agent who had been given the task of planting it was arrested when he was discovered by a maid. Maheu successfully settled the matter with the local authorities however the FBI nonetheless sought to prosecute. On 7 May 1962 the CIA's general counsel Lawrence Houston and security director Sheffield Edwards briefed the Attorney General Robert F. Kennedy on the situation, imploring him to intervene. Kennedy agreed but was unhappy with the situation, stating "I trust that if you ever try to do business with organized crime again−with gangsters−you will let the Attorney General know before you do it". Giancana and McGuire, who had a long-lasting affair, were originally introduced by Frank Sinatra. According to Antoinette Giancana, during part of the affair, McGuire had a concurrent affair with President Kennedy.

=== Downfall ===
When Giancana was called before a grand jury on June 1, 1965, he remained silent despite having been granted immunity, which resulted in his jailing for contempt of court for more than a year, the duration of the grand jury. His lawyer Edward Bennett Williams had advised him otherwise, but Giancana did not believe he would be prosecuted as he had helped the CIA in their attempts to assassinate Fidel Castro. Meanwhile, Giancana was deposed as operational boss by Ricca and Accardo, and replaced by Joseph "Joey Doves" Aiuppa.

After his release from prison in 1966, Giancana fled to Cuernavaca, Mexico, to avoid further grand jury questioning. He was arrested by Mexican authorities on July 19, 1974, and deported to the United States. He arrived back in Chicago on July 21, 1974.

== Personal life ==
One of the most violent criminals in U.S. history, Giancana acquired the nickname "Momo," from the slang term "mooner," meaning "madman."—encyclopedia.com

Giancana signed a card to his wife as "Mooney".

On September 23, 1933, Giancana married Angeline DeTolve, the daughter of immigrants from the Italian region of Basilicata, while living in The Island, Chicago. They had three daughters: Antoinette, born 1935; Bonnie Lou (La Bonita), born 1938; and Francine, born 1945. In 1945, they bought a house in Oak Park, Illinois. Angeline died on April 23, 1954, leaving Giancana to raise his daughters.

In summer 1963, Giancana stayed with Phyllis McGuire in one of the Cal-Neva Lodge chalets while the McGuire Sisters were there to perform in the Celebrity Room, which led to a scandal that cost Frank Sinatra his ownership in the Cal-Neva, as well as his part ownership in the Sands Hotel.

== Death ==
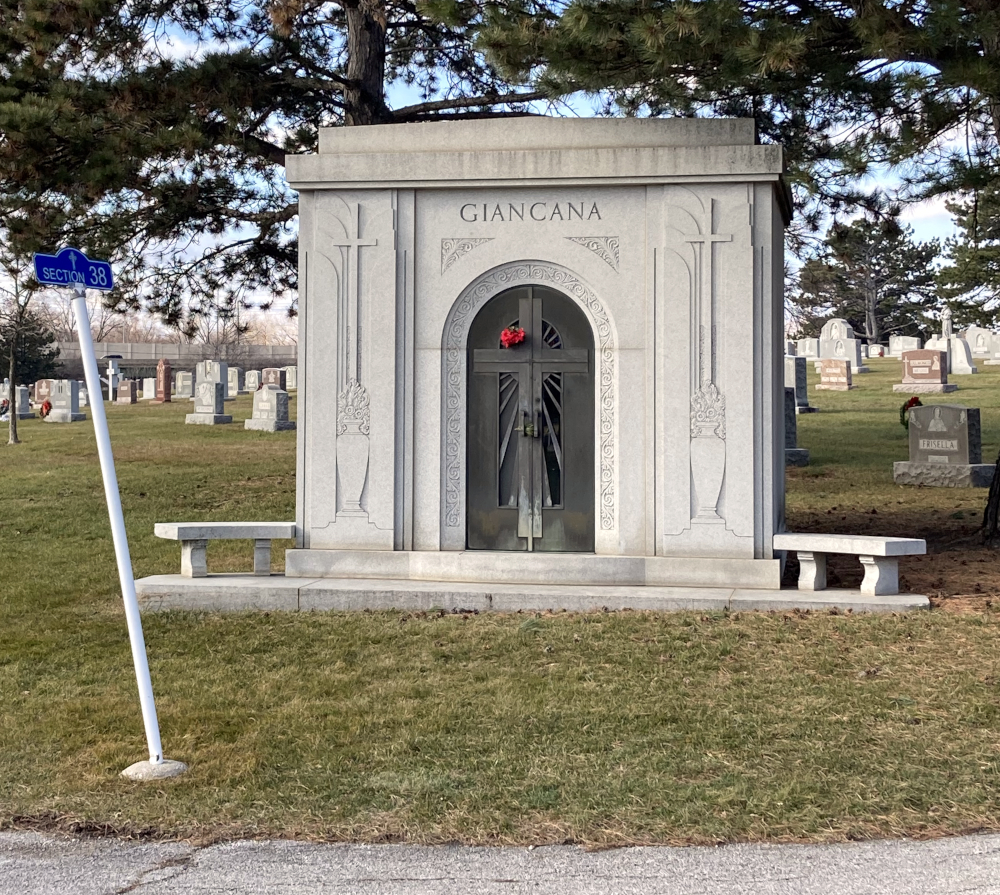
Giancana mausoleum at Mount Carmel Cemetery

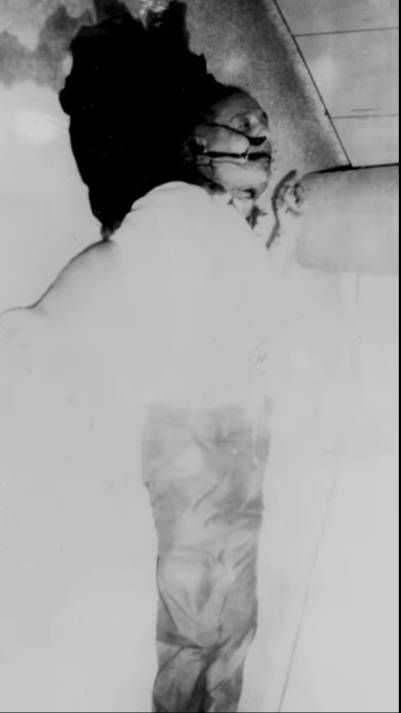
Giancana crime scene June 1975

After Giancana returned to the U.S., police detailed officers to guard his house in Oak Park, Illinois, but on the night of June 19, 1975, shortly before he was scheduled to appear before the Church Committee, which was investigating CIA and Cosa Nostra collusion, a gunman entered the house through the basement and shot Giancana in the head and neck seven times with a .22-caliber pistol. At around 11 p.m., Joseph DiPersio, Giancana's caretaker, found his body on the floor of the basement kitchen where he was said to have been frying sausage and peppers. A week before his death, Giancana had gall bladder surgery in Houston.

Although longtime associate Dominic "Butch" Blasi was with Giancana the night he was murdered and questioned by police as a suspect, neither the FBI nor Antoinette Giancana believes he killed Giancana. Hitman Nicholas Calabrese told the FBI during the 2000s that he knew that Tony Accardo was part of the killing and Angelo LaPietra got rid of the gun, which used a suppressor made by Frank Calabrese Sr. and Ronnie Jarret.

Before his death Giancana had been subpoenaed and was set to testify before the Church Committee of the US Senate on Mafia involvement in CIA plots to assassinate Cuban leader Fidel Castro. In consideration of this, one explanation provided for Giancana's death is that Santo Trafficante Jr. ordered Giancana's murder due to fear about what he might say to the committee. Trafficante would have needed permission from Outfit bosses Accardo and Joseph Aiuppa, but Giancana's murder coincided with the discovery of the decomposing remains of Johnny Roselli in an oil drum floating off Miami; he had been shot and chopped up before being dumped in the sea. Some suspected that Roselli was killed on Trafficante's orders. Members of the Giancana family such as his daughter Antoinette have considered this as the reason for his killing.

There were rumors that the CIA killed Giancana because of his links to it. Former CIA Director William Colby said, "We had nothing to do with it." During the Scelso deposition, John Whitten said he suspected William Harvey, a CIA assassin who was in the area.

Within days of Giancana's murder, Michael J. Corbitt, the police chief of Willow Springs, Illinois, and a mobster associate, was told by Chicago Outfit's capo Salvatore Bastone that "Sam sure loved that little guy in Oak Park... Tony Spilotro. Yeah, he was fuckin' crazy about him. Sam put Tony on the fuckin' map, thought he was gonna be a big fuckin' man someday. Did you know that after Marshall Caifano got out of Vegas, it was Sam who wanted Tony Spilotro out there? Even lately, with all the problems with the skim and all, Sam always stood behind the guy. Tony was over to Sam's house all the time. He lived right by there. Did you know Tony even figured out a way where he could get in through the back of Sam's place without anybody seeing him? He'd go through other people's yards, go over fences, all sorts of shit." When Corbitt asked for the reason for the murder, Bastone quipped, "There's never just one reason for shit like what happened to Sam. There's a million of 'em. Let's just say that Sam should've remembered what happened to Bugsy Siegel."

== In popular culture ==
=== Movies ===
- Giancana was a major topic in the J. X. Williams movie Peep Show (1965).
- The TV film Mafia Princess (1986) starring Tony Curtis as Giancana.
- News footage of Giancana is featured in the movie JFK (1991).
- Carmine Caridi played Giancana in the movie Ruby (1992).
- The HBO made-for-TV movie Sugartime (1995) depicts Giancana's relationship with singer Phyllis McGuire with Giancana played by John Turturro.
- Robert Miranda played Giancana in the television movie The Rat Pack (1998).
- Peter Friedman played Giancana in the movie Power and Beauty (2002).
- In the movie The Good Shepherd (2006), the character played by Joe Pesci, Joseph Palmi, was a mix of several mobsters, including Giancana, Santo Trafficante Jr., and Carlos Marcello, who were involved with the CIA's operation Family Jewels. Matt Damon's character, Edward Wilson, is depicted proposing that Palmi assist in assassinating Castro.
- Momo: The Sam Giancana Story (2011) – two Giancana daughters recall their father and the assassinations of Marilyn Monroe and JFK.
- Al Linea plays Giancana in the movie The Irishman (2019).
- Thomas Fiscella plays Giancana in the movie November 1963 (2026).

=== Television ===
- Giancana features in the first episode of the documentary series Mafia's Greatest Hits, on the UK history TV channel Yesterday.
- Rod Steiger portrayed Giancana in the TV miniseries Sinatra (1992).
- Serge Houde portrays Giancana as a major nemesis of the Kennedy family in the television miniseries The Kennedys (2011).
- The character Mob Man (uncredited) from the fourth-season The X-Files episode "Musings of a Cigarette Smoking Man", who is present at a planning meeting on the assassination of JFK, is likely based on Giancana.
- Giancana is portrayed by Emmett Skilton in the eight-part AMC television miniseries The Making of the Mob: Chicago (2016).
- Giancana is mentioned (with a photo) as a factor in a fictional impeachment of JFK, in a scene in "Tikka to Ride", the opening episode of series 7 of the British sitcom Red Dwarf (1997).
- Giancana's image is included in the opening credits of the Starz TV series Magic City (2012–13).
- Giancana is seen and referenced at a Las Vegas casino in the TV series Timeless in the episode Atomic City (2016).

=== Non-fiction ===
- Giancana is the subject of the biography Mafia Princess, written by his daughter Antoinette.
- The book Double Cross: The Explosive, Inside Story of the Mobster Who Controlled America tells the story of Giancana's life. Written by his brother Chuck Giancana, and his godson and namesake Sam Giancana, the book includes revelations about the deaths of JFK, Marilyn Monroe, and RFK.
- Giancana is mentioned in Charles Brandt's narrative nonfiction book I Heard You Paint Houses (2004).

=== Fiction ===
- Giancana is a major character in Max Allan Collins's novels Chicago Confidential and Road to Paradise.
- Giancana plays a major role in James Ellroy's fiction, most notably American Tabloid and its sequels The Cold Six Thousand and Blood's a Rover.
- Giancana is a character in Robert J. Randisi's Rat Pack novels.
- Giancana is a notable character in Norman Mailer's 1991 historical fiction Harlot's Ghost.
- The fictional character Louie Russo in Mark Winegardner's 2004 novel The Godfather Returns may be based on Giancana.
- Giancana is a character in Robert Littell's 2002 CIA novel The Company.
- The fictional character "Sam" in Steve Peters and Kay Stephens's novel The Outlaw Sandra Love (2013) is based on Giancana.
- In the 2013 novel The Outlaw, the protagonist Sandra Love is said to have had a four-year relationship with a man named Sam, the head of the Chicago Outfit during the early 1960s.

=== Music ===
- Rapper Kool G Rap once stated that the "G" in his name stands for Giancana. Kool G Rap released an album called The Giancana Story (2002).
- Giancana is mentioned in the song "Dope money" by The Lox ("Bring Drama 'cause Giancana got Kennedy Killed") on the album Ryde or Die Vol. 1.

== See also ==
- List of homicides in Illinois § Organized crime
- List of unsolved murders (1900–1979)

== Sources ==
- Corbitt, Michael; Giancana, Sam; Giancana, Bettina (2004), Double Deal: The Inside Story of Murder, Unbridled Corruption, and the Cop Who Was a Mobster, Avon Publications, ISBN 978-0-06-103048-2
- Organized Crime in Chicago: Hearing Before the Permanent Subcommittee on Investigations of the Committee on Governmental Affairs, United States Senate, Ninety-eighth Congress, First Session, March 4, 1983. U.S. Government Printing Office. March 4, 1983.

American Mafia
Preceded by Anthony Accardo	Chicago Outfit; Underboss; 1947–1957	Succeeded by Frank Ferraro
Preceded by Anthony Accardo	Chicago Outfit; Boss; 1957–1966	Succeeded by Sam Battaglia
