= Brown's Requiem =

Brown's Requiem may refer to:

- Brown's Requiem (novel), a 1981 crime novel, the first novel by American author James Ellroy
- Brown's Requiem (film), a 1998 film written and directed by Jason Freeland
