= Guy Banister =

American FBI agent and activist (1901–1964)

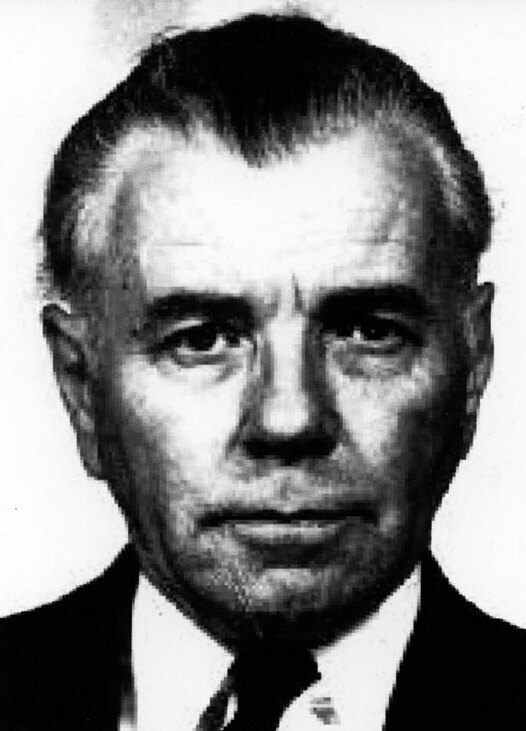
- Photo of Banister from the House Select Committee on Assassinations
- Born: William Guy Banister; March 7, 1901; Monroe, Louisiana, U.S.
- Died: June 6, 1964 (aged 63); New Orleans, Louisiana, U.S.
- Education: Louisiana State University
- Occupations: Federal Bureau of Investigation; Private investigator
- Known for: Allegations made by Jim Garrison during his investigation of the John F. Kennedy assassination

William Guy Banister (March 7, 1901 – June 6, 1964) was a Federal Bureau of Investigation (FBI) agent, an assistant superintendent of the New Orleans Police Department, and later a private investigator and anti-communist activist. After his death, he was accused by New Orleans District Attorney Jim Garrison of involvement in the assassination of John F. Kennedy. In the late 1970s, the House Select Committee on Assassinations (HSCA) investigated Banister as part of its inquiry into a possible New Orleans connection to the JFK assassination.

== Early life and law enforcement career ==
William Guy Banister was born in Monroe, Louisiana, the oldest of seven children. After studying at Louisiana State University, he joined the Monroe Police Department. In 1934, he joined the FBI and was assigned to the Indianapolis office. While Banister claimed in personal biographical notes that he was present at the 1934 killing of John Dillinger, FBI operational reports and agent rosters do not place Banister at Chicago's Biograph Theater when law enforcement had its fatal confrontation with the notorious bank robber.

Banister later moved to New York City where he was involved in the investigation of the American Communist Party. FBI Director J. Edgar Hoover was impressed by Banister's work and, in May 1938, he was promoted to run the FBI unit in Butte, Montana. In December 1944, Banister investigated a Fu-Go balloon bomb near Kalispell, Montana. During the 1947 flying disc craze, he examined a saucer hoax in Twin Falls.

Banister also served in the Oklahoma City, Minneapolis and Chicago FBI offices. In Chicago he was promoted to Special Agent in Charge in 1953. He retired from the FBI in 1955, and moved back to Louisiana where he became Assistant Superintendent of the New Orleans Police Department. He was tasked with investigating corruption and ties to organized crime within the police force. In December 1955, he publicly revealed 91 members of the police who were involved in graft, after a list was found at the home of an illegal lottery operator. It later emerged that Banister was also looking at the role played by left-wing activists in the struggle for civil rights in New Orleans. On 7 March 1957 Banister testified at a public hearing of the Louisiana Joint Legislative Committee on the topic of "Subversion in Racial Unrest". He testified that communism intended to "dominate the world" and remarked that it "exploits every complaint of the people made against the government or government officials". Later he appeared at a similar hearing organized by the Arkansas legislature which also attempted to link the civil rights movement with communism. On 18 December 1958 he testified that the purpose of the Southern Regional Council was to "create friction between the races", which communism "thrives" on. On the campuses of Tulane University and Louisiana State University, Banister ran a network of informants collecting information on "communist" activities. He submitted reports on his findings to the FBI through contacts.

In March 1957, NOPD Superintendent Provosty Dayries suspended Banister after witnesses reported he had drawn his revolver while threatening a bartender at the Old Absinthe House on Bourbon Street in the French Quarter. Banister denied the allegations, and the bartender described the incident as an "unprovoked attack". Later in March, Banister appeared before the state's Joint Legislative Segregation Committee where he reiterated that he had "documentary proof of clear and specific communist directions to promote friction between the races". He also told of investigating the first Japanese fire balloon to land in the US. His NOPD suspension ended on June 1, 1957, but within two weeks Dayries dismissed Banister from the police force for "open defiance" after he refused to be reassigned as the department's chief of planning. In supporting Dayries' decision, New Orleans' mayor Chep Morrison said there was "no other course that one could sensibly follow".

== Private investigator, Cuba, Oswald, Marcello ==
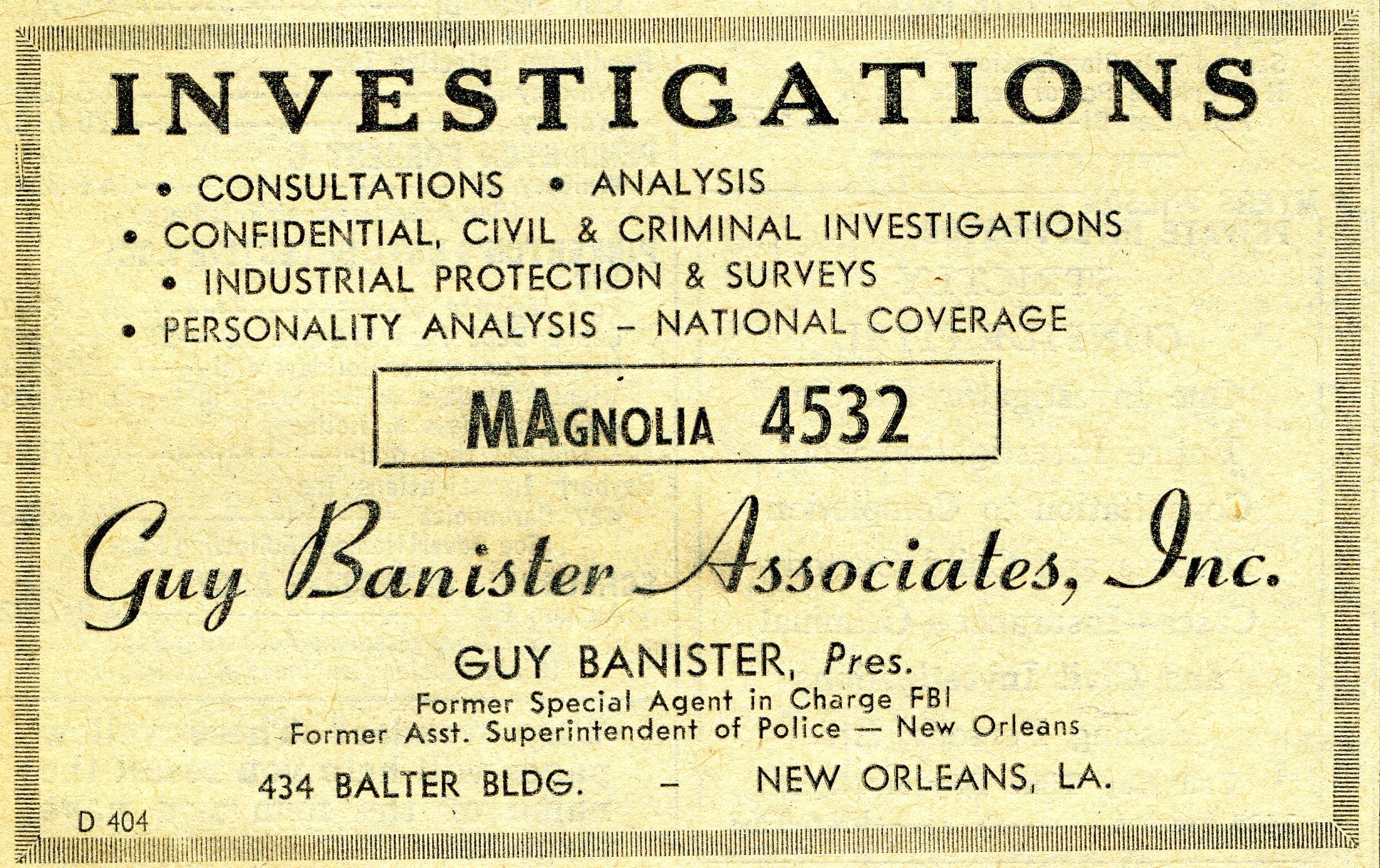
1959 Guy Banister Associates, Inc. Yellow Pages advertisement in New Orleans Telephone Directory

After leaving the NOPD, Banister established his own private detective agency, Guy Banister Associates, Inc. at 434 Balter Building. In June 1960, he moved his office to 531 Lafayette Street on the ground floor of the Newman Building. Around the corner but located in the same building, with a different entrance, was the address 544 Camp Street, which would be stamped on the pro-communist Fair Play for Cuba Committee leaflets distributed in 1963 by JFK assassin Lee Harvey Oswald. The Newman Building also housed militant anti-Castro groups, including the Cuban Revolutionary Council (October 1961 to February 1962), as well as Sergio Arcacha Smith's Crusade to Free Cuba Committee.

Banister was implicated in a 1961 raid on a munitions depot in Houma, Louisiana, in which "various weapons, grenades and ammunition were stolen ... which were reportedly seen stacked in Banister's back room by several witnesses." At the beginning of 1961, he began publishing the Louisiana Intelligence Digest, a racist anti-communist publication. He was also said to have been a member of the Minutemen militia organization. The New Orleans States-Item newspaper reported an allegation that Banister served as a munitions supplier for the 1961 Bay of Pigs Invasion and continued to deal weapons from his office until 1963. The newspaper characterized him as having "participated in every anti-Communist South and Central American revolution that came along, acting as a key liaison man for the U.S. government-sponsored anti-Communist activities in Latin America." In its biographical sketch of Banister, the HSCA wrote that FBI files showed he "became excessively active in anti-Communist activities after his separation from the FBI and testified before various investigating bodies about the dangers of communism."

In 1962, Banister allegedly dispatched an associate, Maurice Brooks Gatlin — legal counsel of Banister's "Anti-Communist League of the Caribbean" — to Paris to deliver a suitcase containing $200,000 for the French OAS. In 1963, Banister and anti-Castro activist David Ferrie began working for a lawyer named G. Wray Gill and his client, New Orleans Mafia boss Carlos Marcello. This work entailed defending Marcello in a deportation case. In early 1962, Banister assisted Ferrie, an Eastern Airlines pilot, in a dispute in which the airline and the New Orleans police brought charges against Ferrie for "crimes against nature and extortion." During this period, Ferrie was frequently seen at Banister's office. Banister served as a character witness for Ferrie at his airline pilot's grievance board hearing in the summer of 1963.

== JFK assassination and trial of Clay Shaw ==
On the afternoon of November 22, 1963, the day that President Kennedy was assassinated, Banister and one of his investigators, Jack Martin, were drinking together at the Katzenjammer Bar, located next door to 544 Camp Street in New Orleans. On their return to Banister's office, the two men got into an argument. Banister, believing that Martin had stolen some files, drew his .357 Magnum revolver and struck Martin with it several times. Martin was badly injured and treated at Charity Hospital. When questioned about the incident in December 1977 by investigators for the United States House Select Committee on Assassinations (HSCA), Martin said that in the heat of the argument just prior to the pistol-whipping, he asked Banister, "What are you going to do — kill me like you all did Kennedy?"

Over the next few days, Martin told authorities and reporters that Ferrie had been involved in the assassination. He maintained that Ferrie knew Oswald from their days in the New Orleans Civil Air Patrol, and that Ferrie might have taught Oswald how to use a rifle with a telescopic sight. Martin also asserted that Ferrie drove to Texas on the day of Kennedy's assassination to serve as a getaway pilot for the assassins. Witnesses interviewed by the HSCA indicated that Banister was "aware of Oswald and his Fair Play for Cuba Committee before the assassination."

Banister's secretary, Delphine Roberts, told author Anthony Summers that Oswald "seemed to be on familiar terms with Banister and with [Banister's] office." Roberts said, "As I understood it, he had the use of an office on the second floor, above the main office where we worked. Then, several times, Mr. Banister brought me upstairs, and in the office above I saw various writings stuck up on the wall pertaining to Cuba. There were various leaflets up there pertaining to Fair Play for Cuba." The HSCA concluded that because of contradictions in some of Roberts' claims and the lack of independent corroboration, "the reliability of her statements could not be determined."

The reputed activities of Banister, Ferrie and Oswald reached New Orleans District Attorney (DA) Jim Garrison who, by late 1966, was pursuing a possible New Orleans connection to the JFK assassination. In December 1966, Garrison interviewed Martin who said that Banister, Ferrie and a group of anti-Castro Cuban exiles were involved in operations against Castro's Cuba that included gun running and burglarized armories.

As Garrison continued his investigation, he became convinced that a group of right-wing activists, including Banister, Ferrie and Clay Shaw, participated in a conspiracy with elements of the Central Intelligence Agency (CIA) to kill Kennedy. Garrison claimed that the motive for the assassination was to stop the President "from achieving peaceful relations with the Communist world". The New Orleans DA also believed Banister, Ferrie, and Shaw had plotted to set up Oswald as a patsy in the assassination. By early 1967, with Banister and Ferrie deceased, Garrison indicted Shaw for conspiring to assassinate JFK but failed to obtain a conviction.

== Death ==
Banister died of coronary thrombosis on June 6, 1964. His extensive office files were said to have been "scattered" after his death, with some allegedly being removed by government agents. Later, New Orleans Assistant DA Andrew Sciambra interviewed Banister's widow. She told him she saw Fair Play for Cuba leaflets in Banister's office when she went there following his death.

== In media ==
Banister is a character in Oliver Stone's 1991 movie JFK, in which he is portrayed by Edward Asner. He is also central to the plot of Don DeLillo's novel Libra. Banister appears as a character in James Ellroy's 1995 novel American Tabloid and its sequel The Cold Six Thousand. In American Tabloid, Banister organizes John Kennedy's assassination, which is based on Ward Littell's original plan. In The Cold Six Thousand, Banister is murdered by Chuck Rogers under orders from Carlos Marcello.

== Sources ==
- "Chapter XII. David Ferrie". Appendix to Hearings before the Select Committee on Assassinations of the U.S. House of Representatives. Vol. X. Washington, D.C.: United States Government Printing Office. March 1979. pp. 105–122.
- "Chapter XIII. 544 Camp Street and Related Events". Appendix to Hearings before the Select Committee on Assassinations of the U.S. House of Representatives. Vol. X. Washington, D.C.: United States Government Printing Office. March 1979. pp. 123–136.
