= Underworld USA Trilogy =

Novel series by James Ellroy

The Underworld USA Trilogy is the collective name given to three novels by American crime author James Ellroy: American Tabloid (1995), The Cold Six Thousand (2001), and Blood's a Rover (2009).

== Overview ==
The trilogy blends fiction and history to tell a story of political and legal corruption in the United States between 1958 and 1973. American Tabloid covers the years 1958 to 1963, beginning exactly five years before the assassination of John F. Kennedy, with the assassination as the book's dénouement. The Cold Six Thousand begins concurrently with the end of American Tabloid and covers a slightly longer period, culminating in the assassinations of Martin Luther King Jr. and Robert F. Kennedy in 1968. Blood's a Rover spans the years 1968 to 1973, encompassing the Vietnam War, the death of J. Edgar Hoover, the Black Power movement, the Mob's attempt to build casinos in the Dominican Republic, and the Nixon administration.

Ellroy has described the central themes of the trilogy:

The essential contention of the Underworld USA trilogy ... is that America was never innocent. Here's the lineage: America was founded on a bedrock of racism, slaughter of the indigenous people, slavery, religious lunacy ... and nations are never innocent. Let alone nations as powerful as our beloved fatherland. What you have in The Cold Six Thousand — which covers the years '63 to '68 — is that last gasp of pre-public-accountability America where the anti-communist mandate justified virtually any action. And it wasn't Kennedy's death that engendered mass skepticism. It was the protracted horror of the Vietnamese war.

== Characters ==
=== Protagonists ===
- American Tabloid: Pete Bondurant, Kemper Boyd, Ward J. Littell
- The Cold Six Thousand: Wayne Tedrow Jr., Ward J. Littell, Pete Bondurant
- Blood's A Rover: Wayne Tedrow Jr., Don Crutchfield, Dwight Holly, Scotty Bennett, Joan Rosen Klein (later in the novel, Scotty and Joan become protagonists); also journal entries from Karen Sifakis and Marshall E. Bowen

=== Historical figures ===
Real people who appear as characters in the trilogy include: John F. Kennedy, Robert F. Kennedy, Martin Luther King Jr., J. Edgar Hoover, Richard M. Nixon, Joseph P. Kennedy Sr., Jimmy Hoffa, Guy Banister, Howard Hughes, Sam Giancana, Carlos Marcello, Johnny Roselli, Jack Ruby, Chuck Rogers, Peter Lawford, Lyndon B. Johnson, Lee Harvey Oswald, J. D. Tippit, Lee Bowers, Betty McDonald, Jim Koethe, Jack Zangetty, Hank Killiam, Joseph Milteer, Bayard Rustin, James Earl Ray, Sirhan Sirhan, Sal Mineo, Moe Dalitz, Santo Trafficante Jr., Bebe Rebozo, E. Howard Hunt, Fred Otash, Sonny Liston, Thomas Reddin, and Joaquín Balaguer.

In most cases, the actions of the historical figures are not those of record.

== Literary devices ==
=== Triple narrator ===
Each novel is written from the viewpoint of three separate characters, as in Ellroy's previous books The Big Nowhere and L.A. Confidential. Each chapter focuses on a single protagonist in a third-person narrative that excludes any information of which he or she would be unaware. The protagonists are often policemen or former policeman, sometimes with a shared love interest.

=== Document inserts ===
As in many of his former novels, Ellroy includes excerpts from fictional newspaper articles, letters, confidential reports and memoranda. In this trilogy, he also includes imagined transcripts of bugged conversations and wire taps.
