= Daddy-O (film) =

1959 film

- Theatrical release poster
- Directed by: Lou Place
- Written by: David Moessinger
- Produced by: Elmer C. Rhoden Jr.
- Starring: Dick Contino; Sandra Giles; Bruno VeSota; John McClure
- Cinematography: Perry Finnerman
- Edited by: Richard C. Currier
- Music by: John Williams
- Distributed by: American International Pictures
- Release date: March 1959
- Running time: 73 minutes
- Country: United States
- Language: English
- Budget: $100,000

Daddy-O is a 1959 B movie starring Dick Contino, Sandra Giles, and Bruno VeSota. It was directed by Lou Place and written by David Moessinger. The film is notable for its soundtrack as being the debut film score for John Williams. The film was released by American International Pictures as a double feature with Roadracers. It was later featured on the television series Mystery Science Theater 3000. Daddy-O was produced by Elmer C. Rhoden Jr., who also produced The Delinquents (1957) and The Cool and the Crazy (1958).

== Plot ==
Hotshot street-racer Phil Sandifer (Contino) is working as a truck driver when he is harassed by a sports car driving on the highway. He later meets up with the driver, Jana (Giles), in a local club. Jana challenges Phil to a race; Jana runs Phil off the road, and he loses. At the same time, his best friend Sonny is run off the road and killed by an unidentified assailant (VeSota).

Later at the club, Phil is arrested for destruction of city property and trespassing in the area they raced through, reckless driving, and hit-and-run and manslaughter for Sonny's death. The hit-and-run and manslaughter charges are dropped but Phil is found guilty of the other three charges – as a result, Phil is placed on probation and is stripped of his driver's license. Phil quickly launches his own investigation into Sonny's murder, his first suspect being Jana. He quickly realizes she is not to blame, and she joins Phil in his investigation. He follows the trail of clues to nightclub owner Sidney Chillas (Sonny's assailant), and Chillas's extremely near-sighted lackey Bruce, who runs the gym Sonny used to frequent. Chillas hires Phil as a singer under the alias of "Daddy-O", but this only serves as a cover for Phil to transport illicit packages for Chillas, using a phony driver's license.

Not long after being hired, Phil is beaten up by a couple of drug dealers who have mistaken him for Pete Plum, the name on his phony license, and he realizes the name must have previously been used by Sonny. Phil draws the conclusion that Sonny had also been working for Chillas, and that he had stolen some of the drug money and was killed as a result. Phil and Jana witness Chillas as he has a falling out with his business partners; the two are caught, resulting in Jana being taken hostage. Intending to leave town before his former associates decide to kill him, Chillas orders Phil to retrieve a stash of money for him in exchange for releasing Jana. He sends Bruce along to keep Phil at gunpoint during the task. Bruce, however, decides to steal the money. Phil disarms him and beats him unconscious after knocking off his glasses, but Phil flees in the car without the money. After calling the police, Phil confronts Chillas. He manages to lure Chillas to a liquor cellar, where the two fight; Phil prevails and knocks Chillas out. Meanwhile, Bruce returns and takes Jana hostage to have her drive him back to the abandoned cash, but the police soon arrive and arrest him and Chillas. The movie ends just as Phil is asked to sing.

== Cast ==
- Dick Contino as Phil Sandifer / Daddy-O
- Sandra Giles as Jana Ryan
- Bruno VeSota as Sidney Chillas
- Gloria Victor as Marcia Hayes
- Ron McNeil as Duke Manion
- Jack McClure as Bruce Green
- Sonia Torgeson as Peg Lawrence
- Kelly Gordon as Ken
- Hank Mann as Barney
- Joseph Donte as Frank Wooster
- Joseph Martin as Kerm
- Bob Banas as Sonny DiMarco

== Release, reception and legacy ==
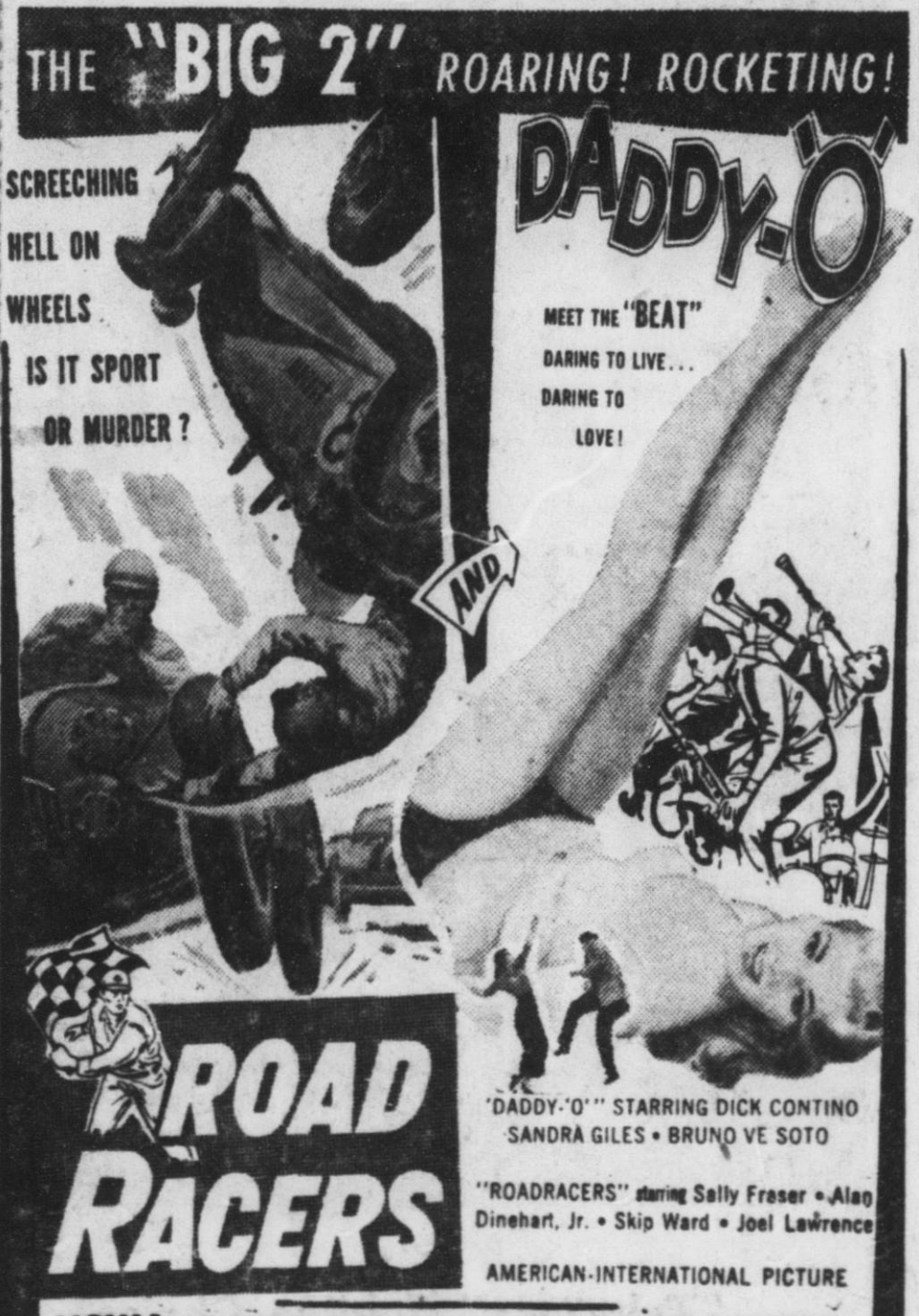
Advertisement from 1959 for Daddy-O and co-feature Roadracers

The film was released by American International Pictures on a double bill with Roadracers.

=== Mystery Science Theater 3000 ===
The film was featured in episode #307 of the television series Mystery Science Theater 3000, paired with the short Alphabet Antics. The episode also features a parody of the film's song "Rock Candy Baby", with Joel Robinson, Crow T. Robot, and Tom Servo performing the tune as "Hike Your Pants Up".

The episode was part of the Mystery Science Theater 3000 Volume XXXIII DVD box set, released by Shout Factory in July 2015. The other episodes in the four-disc set include Earth vs. the Spider (episode #313), Teen-Age Crime Wave (episode #522), and Agent for H.A.R.M. (episode #815).

== In other media ==
- In the 1994 hit film Pulp Fiction, a poster for Daddy-O is visible during scenes taking place in the 1950s nostalgia restaurant "Jack Rabbit Slim's".
- In 1994 author James Ellroy wrote Hollywood Nocturnes, a collection of short stories, one of which was titled Dick Contino's Blues, a fictional take on the making of Daddy-O and surrounding back story starring Dick Contino.

== See also ==
- List of American films of 1959
- Traditional pop
- The Beatniks, a 1960 film similar to Daddy-O
