= Destination: Morgue! =

2004 short story collection by James Ellroy

- First edition cover
- Author: James Ellroy
- Cover artist: Cover design by Chip Kidd; Cover images: Los Angeles Times Collection, Department of Special Collections, Charles E. Young Research Library, UCLA
- Language: English
- Subject: True crime
- Genre: Short stories, novellas, crime fiction
- Publisher: Vintage Books
- Publication date: September 28, 2004
- Publication place: United States
- Media type: Print (paperback)
- Pages: 389 pp (first edition, trade paperback)
- ISBN: 1-4000-3287-3 (first edition, trade paperback)
- OCLC: 56415854
- Dewey Decimal: 813/.54 22
- LC Class: PS3555.L6274 D47 2004

Destination: Morgue! L.A. Tales is a 2004 collection of 12 short works by American crime fiction writer James Ellroy. Eight of the pieces are non-fiction crime reportage or essays that Ellroy originally wrote for GQ magazine, some of which are autobiographical (see also his memoir My Dark Places). Also included are three new novellas ("Hollywood Fuck Pad," "Hot-Prowl Rape-O," and "Jungle Jihad") and one short story previously published in GQ ("The Trouble I Cause"). Earlier GQ pieces by Ellroy can be found in the 1999 collection Crime Wave.

== Contents ==
- Part I: Crime Culture / Memoir
  - "Balls to the Wall"
  - "Where I Get My Weird Shit"
  - "Stephanie"
  - "Grave Doubt"
  - "My Life as a Creep"
  - "The D.A."
  - "Little Sleazer and the Mail-Sex Mama"
  - "I've Got the Goods"
  - "The Trouble I Cause"
- Part II: Rick Loves Donna
  - "Hollywood Fuck Pad"
  - "Hot-Prowl Rape-O"
  - "Jungle Jihad"
