= LAPD '53 =

- First edition cover
- Author: James Ellroy and Glynn Martin
- Cover artist: Cover design by Jacob Covey, jacket and case photos courtesy of the Los Angeles Police Museum
- Language: English
- Genre: Nonfiction, Journalism/Short Fiction, history, photography history, crime, historical non fiction
- Publisher: Abrams Image
- Publication date: May 19, 2015
- Publication place: United States
- Media type: Print (hardback) and Kindle
- Pages: 208 pp (first edition, hardcover) and Kindle
- ISBN: 978-1-4197-1585-3 (first edition, hardcover), ISBN 1419715852
- OCLC: 890623477
- LC Class: 2014942741

LAPD '53 is a historical non-fiction book by James Ellroy and Glynn Martin, about the laws, crimes, and the LAPD, during the year of 1953. Ellroy is a writer known mainly for crime fiction set in Los Angeles. Martin was the executive director for the Los Angeles Police Museum.

This book's information was provided by the Los Angeles Police Museum's archives, as well as more than 80 duotone photographs to illustrate the text. The dedication for LAPD '53 is "FOR Jim and Doug THE VALOROUS ARE TOO OFTEN DEAD OR UNRECOGNIZED". A Time article quoted him saying "Once Glynn and I studied the photos with our book team at the museum, we made the determination that everything we wanted fell under the calendar year of 1953. We were astounded by the diversity of the crimes. There’s a lot of murder and a disproportionate amount of suicide, but what unifies it all is the level of artistry of the photographs themselves...".

== Reception ==
The magazine Los Angeles included it on its list "6 Books You Need to Read in May", saying "LAPD ’53 makes for a coffee table book that is easy to pick up and hard to put down". The New Statesman said of the book "At best, this is a beautifully designed book, on arguably the most important civic police body in the United States of America". The National also included in their list of "Top Six Books This Week". Esquire also included it in its "Book of the Week".
