= Hollywood Nocturnes =

1994 short story collection by James Ellroy

- First edition cover
- Author: James Ellroy
- Cover artist: Jacket design by Chip Kidd (as Iacone Ink)
- Language: English
- Genre: Short stories, crime fiction
- Publisher: Otto Penzler Books
- Publication date: April 1994
- Publication place: United States
- Media type: Print (hardback & paperback) and audio cassette
- Pages: 229 pp (first edition, hardcover)
- ISBN: 978-1-883402-54-9 (first edition, hardcover)

Hollywood Nocturnes is a 1994 collection of short stories by James Ellroy. Like many of Ellroy's novels, the majority of the stories are set in 1940s and 1950s. The collection was inspired by Ellroy's having seen the film Daddy-O and finding cosmic significance in the image of Dick Contino, whom Ellroy tracked down to interview for the book. The first segment of the book, "Dick Contino's Blues", is a novella about Contino tracking down a serial killer while trying to repair his public image after being labeled a draft dodger. Several other stories resurrect deceased Ellroy protagonists, recalling major events in their lives as they near death.

== Contents ==
- "Out of the Past"
- "Dick Contino's Blues"
- "High Darktown"
- "Dial Axminster 6-400"
- "Since I Don't Have You"
- "Gravy Train"
- "Torch Number"

== Alternate versions ==
The collection was also published outside the United States as Dick Contino's Blues and other stories. "Out of the Past" is the first piece in the collection but is included as an "Introduction" by the author, rather than as a short story..

A version of Dick Contino's Blues appeared in issue number 46 of Granta magazine (Winter 1994) along with several photographs of Contino and the author.
