= Hyman Larner =

American gangster (1913–2002)

- Born: November 4, 1913
- Died: October 12, 2002 (aged 88)
- Other names: The Ivy League Mobster
- Occupation: Gangster
- Allegiance: Chicago Outfit

Hyman Larner (November 4, 1913 – October 12, 2002) was an American gangster associated with Sam Giancana and the Chicago Outfit. Known in the newspapers as "the Ivy League Mobster", he was the head of the Chicago Outfit's slot machine racket.

Larner, who was Jewish, kept a low profile but was very powerful with the Chicago underworld. After Eddie Vogel retired from the gambling machine business, Larner became the power behind the scenes.

When he testified before the U.S. Senate Select Committee on Improper Activities in Labor and Management in 1959, he invoked his Fifth Amendment rights fifty-four times.

Larner expanded the Outfit's gambling and smuggling operations to Panama and Iran, moving the organization's Miami operation's headquarters to Panama where money laundering was more easily facilitated by local banks. These operations were conducted as a partnership between the Mafia and the CIA. By 1966, this partnership had developed into arms smuggling to the Middle East for the Israeli Mossad, all via Panama.

Larner had friends among world leaders and key players in the Central Intelligence Agency and the U.S. military, and he was also well connected with Las Vegas bosses like the Teamsters' Allen Dorfman and media mogul Hank Greenspun. One of Larner's closest friends was Meyer Lansky, and the two shared in their passionate Zionism and defense for the Jews' divine right to the land of Israel.
