= Louisiana Intelligence Digest =

- Publisher: William Guy Banister
- Language: English

The Louisiana Intelligence Digest was a publication published by Federal Bureau of Investigation agent and private investigator William Guy Banister.

The publication was an anti-communist publication, "which depicted integration as part of the Communist conspiracy". The first issue of the publication in February 1961 described itself as a "militantly conservative publication.....devoted to the exposure of the operations of the Socialist and Communist organizations in Louisiana, and the dupes, fellow-travelers, and do-gooders who give them aid and comfort".
