= Twin Falls saucer hoax =

Flying saucer hoax (1947)

- On July 12, 1947, the US Army released photos of a hoaxed "flying disc" recovered from Twin Falls. In the wake of the release, flying saucer reports decreased rapidly.
- Date: July 11, 1947
- Location: Twin Falls, Idaho; 42°33′20″N 114°28′15″W
- Type: UFO Hoax
- Perpetrator: Unnamed teenagers

The Twin Falls saucer hoax was a purported flying disc discovered in Twin Falls, Idaho, United States, on July 11, 1947. Amid a nationwide wave of alleged "flying disc" sightings, residents of Twin Falls reported recovering a 30 in (76 cm)-diameter "disc". FBI and Army officials took possession of the disc and quickly proclaimed the object to be a hoax. Press reported that local teenagers admitted to perpetrating the hoax.

== Background ==
On June 24, 1947, civilian pilot Kenneth Arnold reported a sighting of 'flying discs'. By June 27, disc sightings were being reported nation-wide.

On July 1, Twin Falls Times-News declared that "flying saucers have invaded" the Twin Falls region after a forest ranger and his companion reported seeing eight to ten "discs" flying in a V-shaped formation over Galena Summit. The two men were marking timber about three miles south of Galena Summit when they reportedly heard a buzzing noise overhead and saw shining objects above them. One of the witnesses, Walter Nicholson, was quoted as saying "it wasn't anything like an airplane".

The following day, on July 2, press reported on a second sighting. Mr. and Mrs. J. F. Meuser were reportedly driving near Malta, Idaho, when they spotted a lone "big ball of fire" about the size of the moon, only "much brighter".

A third sighting was reported on July 3; railway foreman B. G. Tiffany contacted the Times-News with a story of him and his crew having seen a fleet of nine discs noiselessly flying in a V-shaped formation over Hollister, Idaho, a month prior. Two additional sightings were reported on July 4. Twin Falls resident R. L. Dempsey reported seeing two discs over the city. Three residents of Richfield, Idaho, reported having seen a single disc.

On July 5, a group of 60 picnickers reportedly witnessed 35 discs in the skies over Twin Falls, making it the "largest number of the mystery devices reported anywhere in the nation", according to local press. On July 7, additional sightings were reported, with one report naming three 14- to 15-year-old boys as witnesses of a lone disc that was "the size of a motor scooter wheel".

The Twin Falls disc was not the first story of a recovered disc. On July 8, it had been reported that Army personnel at Roswell had recovered a 'flying disc'; the following day, it was reported that the Roswell debris was an ordinary weather balloon. On July 10, United Press reported on a hoax saucer allegedly recovered in North Hollywood.

== Twin Falls 'disc' ==
On July 11, the press reported the recovery of a 30-inch (76 cm) disc from the yard of a Twin Falls home. Residents reported hearing a "thud" around 2:30 am but dismissed the noise as a truck. At 8:20 am, a next-door neighbor reportedly discovered a "disc" and contacted police.

Local police arrived and took possession of the object. The matter was referred to both FBI and military intelligence. Multiple officers from Fort Douglas (two lieutenant colonels, two first lieutenants, and a civilian) flew in to investigate. Authorities "clamped down a lid of secrecy pending the outcome of further investigation". Local press featured a piece on Army "cloak and dagger" during the disc investigation, mentioning that photographs of the object were confiscated.

On July 11 a Twin Falls newspaper reported the claim that Mrs Easterbrook heard a "thud around 2.30am" and her neighbour "heard something during the early hours Friday morning but thought it was a truck". The next day a Salt Lake City newspaper reported: "Officials stated the boys confessed to planting the disc in the yard of Mrs Thompson at 10:30pm Thursday night".

That same day, the FBI Special Agent In Charge Guy Banister reported the object had been turned over to the Army. On July 12, it was reported nationally that the Twin Falls disc was a hoax. Press reported that four teenagers had confessed to creating the disc. Photos of the object were then publicly released.

=== Description ===
The object was described as containing radio tubes, electric coils, and wires underneath a Plexiglas dome. According to Deseret News:

"The disc is described as being thirty inches in diameter and resembling the base of an old-fashioned chandelier. It has a dome-like bubble, made of plexiglass, on one side and steel dome-like bubble on the other. Inside the plastic dome are three silver painted radio tubes with wires attached to what appears to be an electro-magnetic coil on the outside."

The Independent Record further described it, stating: "The object measured 30 1/2 inches in diameter with a metal dome on one side and a plastic dome about 14 inches high on the opposite side, anchored in place by what appeared to be stove bolts. The gadget is gold painted on one side and silver (either stainless steel, aluminum, or tin) on the other. It appeared to have been turned out by machine."

== Reception and influence ==
The Twin Falls hoax, with its nationally published image showing a bemused army officer holding a disc-like object of mundane construction, has been called the "coup de grâce of press coverage" on the 1947 flying disc craze. In the days following the story, "press accounts rapidly fell off".

The Twin Falls hoax was not the last recovered saucer hoax. On July 28, 1947, just weeks after the Twin Falls hoax, there were reports of recovered disc debris at Maury Island, Washington. In 1949, another 'crashed disc' story circulated as part of the Aztec, New Mexico UFO hoax.

In the late 1960s, Guy Banister, the FBI official who had overseen both the Twin Falls and Maury Island cases, was posthumously accused of involvement in the JFK assassination by New Orleans District Attorney Jim Garrison, as dramatized in the 1991 film JFK. Fringe conspiracy theorists including Kenn Thomas, Nick Redfern, and Peter Lavenda would cite the two cases in connection with both UFO conspiracy theories and JFK assassination conspiracy theories.
