= The Hilliker Curse =

Book by James Ellroy

The Hilliker Curse: My Pursuit of Women
- First edition cover
- Author: James Ellroy
- Language: English
- Subject: Autobiography, relations with women, family relationships, mothers, death, psychological aspect
- Publisher: Knopf
- Publication date: September 7, 2010
- Publication place: United States
- Media type: Print (hardback & paperback) and audio CD, audiobook, audible audio edition, Amazon Kindle
- Pages: 203
- ISBN: 978-0-307-59350-4
- OCLC: 491896235
- Dewey Decimal: 813/.54 B
- LC Class: PS3555.L6274 Z46 2010

The Hilliker Curse: My Pursuit of Women is a work of memoir and autobiography by American author James Ellroy published in 2010. Ellroy dedicated the memoir "To Erika Schickel." The epigraph for The Hilliker Curse: My Pursuit of Women is "I will take Fate by the throat. —Ludwig van Beethoven." The unabridged audiobook version is narrated by Ellroy himself.

The Hilliker Curse: My Pursuit of Women chronicles Ellroy's childhood, his confession of guilt over wishing his mother - Geneva Odelia (née Hilliker) Ellroy - dead, his wild teen life, love affairs, marriages, and finally, his finding of an extraordinary woman whom Ellroy refers to as "Her." It is a narrative of emotion, insight, sexuality, and spiritual quest.
