= Charles Rogers (murder suspect) =

Missing American murder suspect (1921–disappeared 1965)

- Born: Charles Frederick Rogers; December 30, 1921; Houston, Texas, U.S.
- Disappeared: June 23, 1965 (aged 43); Houston, Texas, U.S.
- Status: Declared dead in absentia July 1975 (aged 53)
- Education: University of Houston
- Occupations: Seismologist, pilot
- Known for: Possible involvement with the 1963 assassination of John F. Kennedy, and being the only suspect in The Ice Box Murders

Charles Frederick Rogers (December 30, 1921 – disappeared June 23, 1965) was an American seismologist, pilot, and murder suspect who disappeared in June 1965 after police discovered the dismembered bodies of his elderly parents in the refrigerator of the Houston home all three shared, in what the media later dubbed the "Icebox Murders". Rogers has never been found and was declared dead in absentia in July 1975. He remains the only suspect in the murders, which are still considered unsolved.

== Background and education ==
Charles Rogers enrolled at Texas A&M University in 1942 but later dropped out. He then enrolled at the University of Houston, where he earned a Bachelor of Science degree in nuclear physics. During World War II, Rogers was a pilot in the United States Navy and also served in the Office of Naval Intelligence. After the war, he worked as a seismologist for Shell Oil for nine years. He abruptly quit his job in 1957 without giving an explanation.

Friends and associates of Rogers later said that he was highly intelligent and had a talent for finding gas, oil, and gold for the companies for which he worked. He also spoke seven languages and had an interest in ham radios. In the mid-1950s, Rogers joined the Civil Air Patrol, where he reportedly met David Ferrie, an alleged conspirator in the assassination of President John F. Kennedy.

== Murders and disappearance ==
By 1965, Rogers was unemployed and living with his elderly parents, Fred Christopher (born January 19, 1884) and Edwina Ivor Rogers (born October 8, 1892), in the Montrose neighborhood of Houston. Described as "reclusive", Rogers was reported to have communicated with his parents by way of notes slipped under the door. Neighbors were unaware that Rogers lived with his parents, as he generally left the home before dawn and did not return until after dark.

On June 23, 1965, two Houston police officers were dispatched to the Rogers’ home to conduct a welfare check after Edwina's nephew Marvin reported that his phone calls to his aunt had gone unanswered for days. After receiving no answer after knocking, the officers forced their way into the Rogers’ home. Upon entering, the officers found nothing unusual but noticed food sitting on the dining room table. One officer opened the refrigerator and found what appeared to be numerous cuts of washed, unwrapped meat neatly stacked on the shelves. The officer later recalled that he thought the meat was that of a butchered hog. As the officer was closing the door, he noticed two human heads visible through the clear glass of the vegetable bin. The heads were those of Fred and Edwina Rogers. What the officer initially thought were unwrapped cuts of hog meat were the couple's dismembered limbs and torsos. Police later discovered the couple's organs in a nearby sewer (the organs had been removed, cut up, and flushed down the toilet), while other remains were never found.

Police determined that Fred and Edwina Rogers had been killed on June 20 (Father's Day). An autopsy showed that Fred was bludgeoned to death with a claw hammer. His eyes had been gouged out, and his genitalia were removed. Edwina had been beaten and shot, execution style, in the head. Police further said that the bodies were dismembered in the upstairs bathroom by a person "with some knowledge of anatomy". There was little blood in the house, and it appeared it had been thoroughly cleaned after the murders. What little blood was found led to Charles' bedroom. There, police found a bloodstained keyhole saw but no trace of Rogers himself. A search for Rogers was launched, and a warrant was issued for him as a material witness to the crime, but he was never found.

== Allegations of involvement in the assassination of JFK ==
Rogers' life was documented in the 1992 book The Man on the Grassy Knoll by John R. Craig and Philip A. Rogers. According to this work, Rogers was a CIA agent who was postulated to have impersonated Lee Harvey Oswald in Mexico City and, along with Charles Harrelson, was one of two shooters involved in the assassination of President Kennedy. The authors contend that Rogers, Harrelson, and Chauncey Holt were the "three tramps" arrested in Dealey Plaza after the assassination, and that Rogers murdered his parents because his mother was tracking his telephone calls. In this account, Rogers fled to Guatemala. Publishers Weekly reviewed the book stating: "The authors do a workmanlike job with their thesis, but the degree of poetic license, in terms of reconstructed dialogue and attributed thought, seems excessive here, and sourcing is virtually nonexistent. Assassination buffs, however, will welcome the book for its novelty value and its easy readability."

== Aftermath ==
In 1975, a Houston judge declared Rogers legally dead so his estate could be probated. The case still remains officially unsolved, and Rogers remains the only suspect.

Houston forensic accountant Hugh Gardenier and his wife Martha have continued to investigate the case, concluding that Rogers murdered his parents and was later killed in Honduras. While they have dismissed John R. Craig and Philip A. Rogers's claim that Rogers was a CIA operative due to a lack of evidence, they admit that Rogers did have dealings with contract workers for the CIA when he worked as a seismologist.

The Gardeniers believe that Rogers planned the murder of his parents for years because his father was abusive and both parents were "devious con artists". According to their theory, Fred was a bookie who regularly engaged in illegal activities such as gambling and fraud. The Gardeniers believe he continued abusing Charles into adulthood and began stealing large sums of money from him. They claim that after Rogers killed and dismembered his parents, he fled the U.S. for Mexico and was never found because he was aided by "powerful friends" he met through his ham radio hobby and while working for various oil and mining companies. They have theorized that Rogers eventually made his way to Honduras, where he was killed over a wage dispute with miners.

In October 2003, Redbud Publishing released The Ice Box Murders, a novel written by the Gardeniers. According to a review in the Houston Press: "The Ice Box Murders is written as fact-based fiction and supposition. There are many unnamed characters in the book: various politicians and attorneys, as well as the eyewitness who said he saw Rogers in Honduras after 1965." Publishers Weekly also referred to the novel as "fact-based fiction".

The house in which the murders took place was located at 1815 Driscoll Street. After the murders, the house remained empty and unsold. It was torn down in 1972. The lot remained empty until 2000, when condominiums were built on the lot.

== In popular culture ==
Rogers is featured in two novels by James Ellroy: American Tabloid and The Cold Six Thousand.

The murder case involving Rogers, as well as Hugh and Martha Gardenier looking into the case, is the subject of Episode 41 of the Criminal podcast, titled "Open Case".

== See also ==
- List of fugitives from justice who disappeared
