= Clandestine (novel) =

1982 crime novel by James Ellroy

- First edition
- Author: James Ellroy
- Language: English
- Genre: Crime fiction
- Publisher: Avon Books
- Publication place: United States
- ISBN: 0-380-81141-3
- OCLC: 40775390
- Preceded by: Brown's Requiem (1981)
- Followed by: Blood on the Moon (1984)

Clandestine is a 1982 crime novel by American author James Ellroy. His second novel (after Brown's Requiem), it was initially published by Avon Books in the US, with the first UK edition being published by Allison and Busby in 1984. Ellroy dedicated Clandestine, "to Penny Nagler".

The novel is set in the 1950s, and the protagonist is ambitious LAPD Officer Fred Underhill, a young cop on the rise, working out of the Wilshire station. He covers the beat with his partner Herbert Lawton "Wacky" Walker, a World War II veteran with a Medal of Honor, a drinking problem, and an obsession with death. Underhill and Walker discover the mutilated and strangled corpse of a young secretary. The trail leads to other murders, new and old, and a beautiful crippled district attorney named Lorna Weinberg.

Several characters from Ellroy's later L.A. Quartet series first appear here, including police lieutenant Dudley Smith, Michael Breuning, and Richard Carlisle.

Clandestine earned Ellroy an Edgar Award nomination from Mystery Writers of America in 1982.

== Plot ==
In 1951 Fred Underhill, an orphan police officer, works in Wilshire with his partner Herbert Lawton "Wacky" Walker, spending nights in bars seducing women. One of them, Maggie Cadwallader, confesses that she has a son in an orphanage and, when she discovers Underhill's gun, she panics, thinking that someone has sent him to kill her. While playing golf, Underhill meets Big Sid Weinberg, a B-movie producer, and his daughter Lorna, an assistant of the district attorney.

Then, "Wacky" Walker gets killed in an shootout against some robbers while patrolling with Underhill. During the funeral, Fred argues with his boss, preventing him from being promoted to detective. Instead, he's sent to Watts, considered the worst kind of assignment. Then, Maggie Cadwallader is murdered, strangled in her apartment. Underhill begins investigating on his own, discovering a possible suspect, Eddie Engels, an attractive man who seduces women in bars. Underhill begins working with the relentless detective Dudley Smith. They kidnap and beat Engels, who confesses his bisexuality and his fondness for abusing women. Underhill aims to become the leading man to get a promotion, with Lorna's help. Smith becomes enraged.

However, a homosexual man claims that he was with Engels on the night of Maggie's murder. But just as Engels was about to be released, he commits suicide, sparking a scandal. Smith takes revenge on Underhill by stealing his diary, in which he records his sexual encounters, including one with a supposed communist, Sarah Kefalvian. In the context of McCarthyism and the Korean War, Underhill is fired. Fred and Lorna marry, but by 1955 the couple is on the verge of divorce. Then, the murder of nurse Marcella Harris occurs on El Monte. Intrigued by the similarities to the Cadwallader case, Fred begins investigating. He meets Doc Harris, Marcella's ex-husband, and his son, Mike, a lonely boy with behavioral problems.

Wisconsin native, like Maggie, Fred discovers than Eddie Engels girlfriend gives Marcella Harris a house to live in. Underhill then travels to Tunnel City, Wisconsin, hometown of Harris, not so far away from Waukesha, birthplace of Maggie. There, a man called Will Berglund tells Fred than he and Marcella were together during their teenage years. He also tells that his family and that of DeVries (Marcella's maiden name) were neighbors and, to a certain extent, enemies. Marcella's father, Piet, and Will's father, Willem, had worked together in organized crime but grew to hate each other after a series of deaths in both families. In revenge, Willem raped Marcella when she was a teenager. Piet murdered Willem and then committed suicide. Marcella and her brother, Johnny, fled to New York. There, Marcella became a nurse and Johnny a pharmacist. During World War Two, they worked for the US Navy in Long Beach, where they reunited with Will and met Doc Harris, Eddie Engels, and his accomplice, Larry Brubaker. After the war, Johnny became a junkie and moved to Milwaukee, where he became homeless and was murdered.

Investigating Johnny's death in Milwaukee, Underhill discovers that he closely resembles Mike. He also discovers that Johnny DeVries, Eddie Engels, and Brubaker were all suspected of stealing drugs from the Navy, and that Johnny was married to Maggie Cadwallader: Mike is actually the son of Johnny and Maggie. In search of Maggie's son, who was in an orphanage, Fred comes into contact with a Christian cult to which Will Berglund belongs and with which Marcella and Johnny had ties. He discovers that Marcella was unable to have children and that Doc Harris ate Maggie and Johnny's child. He also discovers Doc's true nature: a sociopath who, working as an abortionist, murdered several women. Through this medium, he exerted power over Johnny, Engels, and Brubaker. Johnny's killer was Doc Harris.

Fred sends Johnny DeVries's journals to Brubaker and returns to Los Angeles. Brubaker (whom Smith and Underhill had previously interrogated) confesses to Doc Harris's abusive homosexual relationship with him, Johnny, and Engels. He also tells Fred that Doc is a morphine trafficker and that he works for the doctor. Brubaker and Underhill go to a meeting with Doc to set a trap for him. Doc, however, suspected Fred from the start and is waiting for him armed. After a shootout, Doc Harris commits suicide.

Finally, a melancholic Fred adopts Mike and returns to Lorna. The novel ends with Underhill thinking about "Wacky" Walker, Dudley Smith, and redemption.
