= American Tabloid =

1995 novel by James Ellroy

- First American edition hardcover
- Author: James Ellroy
- Cover artist: Chip Kidd
- Language: English
- Series: Underworld USA Trilogy
- Genre: Crime novel
- Publisher: Alfred A. Knopf
- Publication date: February 14, 1995
- Publication place: United States
- Media type: Print (hardcover)
- Pages: 576 pp (first edition, hardcover)
- ISBN: 0-679-40391-4 (first edition, hardcover)
- OCLC: 31607613
- Dewey Decimal: 813/.54 20
- LC Class: PS3555.L6274 A8 1995
- Followed by: The Cold Six Thousand

American Tabloid is a 1995 novel by James Ellroy that chronicles the events surrounding three rogue American law enforcement officers from November 22, 1958, through November 22, 1963. Each becomes entangled in a web of interconnecting associations between the FBI, the CIA, and the Mafia, which eventually leads to their collective involvement in the John F. Kennedy assassination.

American Tabloid was Time's Best Book (Fiction) for 1995. It is the first novel in Ellroy's Underworld USA Trilogy, followed by The Cold Six Thousand and Blood's a Rover.

== Structure ==
American Tabloid is divided into five sections. As do the other two Underworld USA books, it contains exactly one hundred chapters (many less than a page in length), and covers exactly five years. The narration eschews both exposition and lengthy dialog exchanges. All chapters begin with the chapter number, the location (usually the name of a city), and the date. The action of the book is completely sequential.

The book is written in the limited third-person, alternating between the three main characters. "Document inserts" reproducing newspaper clippings, letters, and transcripts of telephone calls are interspersed between chapters. There are flashbacks, but they are restricted to the present-tense memory of the protagonists.

== Plot summary ==
=== Part I, Shakedowns, November – December 1958 ===
The novel centers around the three principal characters: Pete Bondurant, a former Los Angeles County sheriff's deputy who presently works for billionaire Howard Hughes as a fixer and runs shakedowns; Kemper Boyd, an FBI agent who covets wealth and power; and Ward Littell, another FBI agent who is Boyd's friend and former partner. Although assigned to monitor communist activities, Littell's abiding hatred of organized crime leads him to vie for a spot on the Bureau's Top Hoodlum Squad.

The three men plot to entrap John F. Kennedy with a call girl; Boyd and Littell for J. Edgar Hoover, Bondurant for Hughes. The set-up is successful, but the Kennedy family prevents the transcript of the encounter from being printed in Hughes' Hush-Hush tabloid newspaper. At Hoover's direction, Boyd leaves the FBI and begins working with Hoover's personal nemeses—Kennedy and his younger brother Robert—on the U.S. Senate Select Committee investigating mob involvement in labor unions. The Kennedys, with their wealth and privilege, embody everything that Boyd hopes to gain. Littell, who meets the Kennedys through Boyd, is enraptured by Robert, both men sharing a hatred for organized crime.

=== Part II, Collusion, January 1959 – January 1961 ===
Following the Cuban Revolution, Bondurant and Boyd both become CIA operatives while Littell investigates Jimmy Hoffa's ties to the mob. Boyd also joins the employ of the Kennedy family, working on John's presidential campaign. Bondurant and Boyd ultimately collaborate with the CIA, the mob (seeking to retake its now-nationalized casinos in Havana) and far-right Cuban refugees plotting to overthrow Fidel Castro's regime. Littell becomes increasingly frustrated with Hoover's anti-communist mandates and begins investigating the mob on his own.

Through a series of snitches, Littell confirms that the Teamsters Union's pension fund is being used to finance organized crime. Littell tracks the fund's supposed "secret" accounting books to the home of mobster Jules Schiffrin in Lake Geneva, Wisconsin, coercing Jack Ruby into searching Schiffrin's home. While waiting for Ruby, Littell is severely beaten by Bondurant; Ruby had tipped off Bondurant to Littell's operation, and Bondurant feared that Littell would endanger the CIA's Cuban plots.

After recuperating, Littell takes leave from the FBI, invades Schiffrin's home and steals the fund's books himself. Cracking the books' code, he realizes that Joseph Kennedy loaned millions of dollars to the fund. Hoover fires Littell, revokes his pension and blackballs him from every U.S. state's bar association. Boyd tries to get Littell a job with now-Attorney General designate Robert Kennedy, who emphatically refuses, also having received a report from Hoover of Littell's budding alcoholism and communist ties.

=== Part III, Pigs, February – November 1961 ===
Boyd and Bondurant help train the "Blessington Cadre": Cuban exiles training to overthrow Castro at a CIA camp in Florida, recruited through Hoffa's "Tiger Kab" taxi stand in Miami. The mob, through New Orleans boss Carlos Marcello, funds the operation by supplying the Cadre heroin for redistribution. Robert Kennedy has Marcello deported, unaware of (and uninterested in) his involvement in the CIA operation. Bondurant covertly absconds with Marcello when his INS plane lands in Central America.

Littell, hired as Marcello's immigration lawyer at Boyd's recommendation, meets Bondurant and Marcello at their hideout and hands over the stolen Teamsters pension fund books to Marcello. President Kennedy, unaware of Boyd's CIA connection, taps Boyd – now also working for the civil rights task force at the Justice Department – to investigate the Blessington operation and advise whether to implement the CIA's invasion strategy. After a sham visit, Boyd naturally encourages the president to authorize the mission, promising Kennedy that it will guarantee his re-election.

The Bay of Pigs Invasion is authorized, although Kennedy second-guesses its wisdom and refuses to provide the air support that the Cadre believes necessary. The invasion fails and proves an embarrassment for Kennedy and all involved—including the CIA, the mob, Bondurant and Boyd. The night of the invasion, Boyd is shot in a side operation to distribute counterfeit doses of heroin that would be linked back to Castro and damage his reputation.

=== Part IV, Heroin, December 1961 – September 1963 ===
Through the patronage of Marcello, Littell becomes a full-fledged mob lawyer and is hired by Hoffa. Through their now-mutual hatred of the Kennedys, Littell and Hoover make amends, and Hoover arranges for Hughes to become Littell's client. In the wake of the Bay of Pigs fiasco, Boyd and Bondurant encourage the mob to authorize an assassination attempt on Castro. When the mob passes on the opportunity, they surmise that the mob is now backing Castro. Enraged, they execute a plan wherein they steal millions of dollars in heroin meant for the mob as it comes to shore from Cuba in the hopes of recouping their losses from the failed invasion.

In collusion with Littell, Bondurant begins running a wiretap hoping to catch President Kennedy having an affair with a woman they have set up. Boyd, however, remains fond of the president and becomes enraged when he discovers the scam. When he confronts Bondurant, he is played sections from the tapes in which Kennedy ridicules Boyd's social-climbing and envy. Robert Kennedy, learning of Boyd's CIA connection and erratic behavior upon discovering the wiretap, fingers Boyd as the person trying to set up the president; he fires Boyd from the Justice Department, severing his ties with the Kennedys. Upon figuring out that Boyd and Bondurant were behind the theft of their heroin, Littell relays the mob's price to atone for the theft: killing President Kennedy.

=== Part V, Contract, September – November 1963 ===
Boyd, Bondurant and Littell plot to assassinate Kennedy during a motorcade in Miami and arrange the logistics to frame right-wing radicals. Without being specific, Littell tips off Hoover about the plot, but due to Hoover's non-committal response he surmises that there is a second assassination plot which will take place several days later in Dallas. The three men are informed their plan is scrapped and begin to cover their tracks in Miami. Littell confronts Robert Kennedy with evidence of his father's collusion with the mob, with the added intent that it will serve as an after-the-fact explanation of why the president would be killed.

After killing several of the Miami conspirators, Bondurant leaves for Dallas while Boyd returns to Mississippi. Littell is waiting for Boyd at his hotel; Littell shoots Boyd, who dies thinking of President Kennedy. Bondurant, his new wife Barb Jahelka and several mob associates converge on Dallas on November 22, 1963. The book ends at 12:30 PM, as Kennedy's motorcade drives through Dealey Plaza, with Bondurant closing his eyes, awaiting the shots and screams.

== Main characters ==
Pete Bondurant is a French-Canadian, ex-law enforcement, Hollywood insider, organized-crime associate, and bodyguard for Howard Hughes.

He bears superficial resemblances to historical figures Fred Otash, (so-called "private-eye to the stars") and Robert Maheu, (who worked for both Hughes and Jimmy Hoffa during the time frame depicted in the book).

Bondurant first appears as a secondary character in White Jazz with only superficial similarities to his character in American Tabloid. The time-frame overlap between the two books leads to some inconsistencies, including the deteriorating mental state of Howard Hughes.

Kemper Boyd is an FBI agent who, in 1958, is recruited by J. Edgar Hoover to infiltrate the Kennedy organization. This assignment leads to CIA contacts, as well as employment to influence the future President Kennedy to take an anti-Castro stance in his Cuban policy. It also puts him in the position to organize the collaboration between Cosa Nostra and the CIA in the Cuban cause. He falls in love with Laura Hughes, the secret daughter of Gloria Swanson and Joseph P. Kennedy Sr., half sister of the Kennedy brothers.

Boyd also bears a resemblance to Robert Maheu, a close friend of the Kennedy brothers and former FBI agent who admitted to involvement in a conspiracy to kill Fidel Castro and has been linked to the JFK assassination.

Ward Littell is an FBI agent clandestinely investigating organized crime activity in defiance of his employer. He is dismissed from the FBI but secures employment as a "Mob" Lawyer and wins his way back into Hoover's good graces.

== Secondary characters ==
Secondary characters, which consist of fictional characters as well as historical figures, include:

- J. Edgar Hoover: Director of the FBI. He has a personal vendetta against the Kennedys.
- John F. Kennedy: Massachusetts senator, presidential candidate, and President of the United States. Kennedy begins the novel as a member of the McClellan Committee, which is charged with investigating organized crime.
- Robert F. Kennedy: Special counsel to the McClellan Committee, named U.S. Attorney General by his brother.
- Joseph P. Kennedy: Father of the Kennedy brothers. After making his fortune as a bootlegger during Prohibition, he has loaned millions of dollars to the mafia through the Teamsters Pension Fund.
- Jimmy Hoffa: President of the Teamsters union, Hoffa maintains close connections to organized crime, lending the mafia millions of dollars through the Teamsters Pension Fund.
- Howard Hughes: Reclusive, eccentric and mentally disturbed, Hughes plans to take over the mafia's casinos in Las Vegas to establish a "germ-free environment" for his residence.
- Guy Banister: Ex-FBI agent and current CIA liaison, Banister helps establish a militia of anti-communist Cuban refugees, the "Blessington Cadre".
- John Stanton: Banister's associate, also with the CIA.
- Lenny Sands: A nightclub singer with mob ties, Littell conscripts Sands as a snitch.
- Jack Ruby: Dallas nightclub owner with ties to organized crime.
- Jules Schiffrin: A Chicago mob elder statesman who keeps the real books of the Teamsters Pension Fund.
- Chuck Rogers: Ex-CIA agent and pilot who enters the service of the Blessington Cadre.
- Laura Hughes: Illegitimate daughter of Joe Kennedy and Gloria Swanson who has taken Howard Hughes's last name just to spite her father.
- Helen Agee: College friend of Littell's daughter who becomes romantically involved with Littell.
- Barb Jahelka: Los Angeles singer and shakedown artist.
- Nestor Chasco: A virulent anti-Castro member of the Blessington Cadre.

Other members of the historical cast include mob bosses Sam Giancana, Carlos Marcello, Santo Trafficante Jr., and John Roselli. Others include Peter Lawford, Frank Sinatra, and J. D. Tippit.

== TV adaptation ==
In 2002, it was reported that Bruce Willis optioned the rights to produce and star in a TV miniseries based on American Tabloid and The Cold Six Thousand. Willis's option expired before he produced the series.

In 2008, Daily Variety reported that HBO, along with Tom Hanks's production company, Playtone, were developing American Tabloid and The Cold Six Thousand for either a mini-series or ongoing series. Screenwriter Kirk Ellis was drafting a screenplay for the potential series.

== Editions ==
- 1995, US, Alfred A Knopf (ISBN 0-679-40391-4), Pub date ? February 1995, hardcover (first edition)
- 1995, UK, Century (ISBN 0-7126-4816-X), Pub date 5 January 1995, hardcover
- 1995, UK, Arrow books (ISBN 0-09-989320-7), Pub date 7 September 1995, paperback
- 2001, US, Vintage Books (ISBN 0-375-72737-X), Pub date ? May 2001, paperback

== Critical reception ==
On November 5, 2019, the BBC News listed American Tabloid on its list of the 100 most influential novels.
