= Widespread Panic (novel) =

2021 novel by James Ellroy

- Author: James Ellroy
- Language: English
- Publisher: Alfred A. Knopf
- Publication date: 2021

Widespread Panic is a 2021 crime fiction novel by American writer James Ellroy. It was first published on June 15, 2021 by Knopf. The book is framed as a narrative by the real person Fred Otash now in "Cell 2607, Penance Penitentiary, Reckless-Wrecker-of-Lives Block, Pervert Purgatory". The novel follows Ostash's career from work as a police officer at the Los Angeles Police Department , his work as a private investigator, and his work with the actual Confidential magazine.

== Summary ==
The narrated novel uses a first person narrative style to relate the fictionalized biography of Freddy Otash which he purportedly is starting in 2020; the prose is written by the author James Ellroy at about when he was becoming a septuagenarian. The plot starts with Otash in purgatory reflecting on his life as a corrupt police officer with his problem of dirty hands leading a dissipated life. Otash is given an opportunity through his previous illicit employment with the salacious gossip magazine Confidential to write his autobiography for them. Otash begins his narrative of the surreptitious lives of Hollywood glamour and criminal elements of which he was a central part of in the 1950s. He revels in relating his overdeveloped libido and pride in his sexual physical endowments and conquests. He often does favors for his contacts among the many actors and actresses whom he befriends in the process of making covert use of his police badge and seemingly tireless pursuit of profit and pleasure in Los Angeles.
