= Crime Wave (book) =

Book by James Ellroy

- First edition cover
- Author: James Ellroy
- Cover artist: Cover design by Chip Kidd
- Language: English
- Subject: True crime
- Genre: Short stories, crime fiction
- Publisher: Vintage Crime / Black Lizard
- Publication date: January 26, 1999
- Publication place: United States
- Media type: Print (paperback) and audio CD
- Pages: 288 pp (first edition, trade paperback)
- ISBN: 0-375-70471-X (first edition, trade paperback)
- OCLC: 39860009
- Dewey Decimal: 813/.54 21
- LC Class: PS3555.L6274 A6 1999

Crime Wave is a 1999 collection of eleven short works of fiction and non-fiction, all originally published in GQ, by American crime fiction writer James Ellroy. The collection, issued as a paperback original, includes a short story ("Hush-Hush"), two novellas ("Tijuana, Mon Amour" and "Hollywood Shakedown"), and eight pieces of crime reports, including "Sex, Glitz, and Greed: The Seduction of O. J. Simpson". More of Ellroy's GQ pieces can be found in the collection Destination: Morgue!.

The true crime report titled "Glamour Jungle" concerns the unsolved murder of aspiring network television actress Karyn Kupcinet that happened in her West Hollywood, California apartment in the early morning hours of Thanksgiving Day, 1963. She was 22 years old. When Ellroy visited the Los Angeles County Sheriff's Department in the mid 1990s to study old documents from that department's investigation of the Kupcinet case, he was assisted by Kupcinet's niece, Kari Kupcinet-Kriser, daughter of Jerry Kupcinet. Kupcinet-Kriser was born many years after her aunt's murder but became fascinated by it.

Neither Ellroy nor Kupcinet-Kriser came any closer to solving the case than the sheriffs had thirty years earlier. Ellroy's report, which was first published in the December 1998 edition of GQ, became the only published source that goes into detail about the homicide and the sheriff's investigation of it that lasted more than five years without resulting in any arrests.

== Contents ==
- Introduction by Art Cooper, Editor-in-Chief, GQ
- Part One: Unsolved
  - "Body Dumps"
  - "My Mother's Killer"
  - "Glamour Jungle"
- Part Two: Getchell
  - "Hush-Hush"
  - "Tijuana, Mon Amour"
- Part Three: Contino
  - "Out of the Past"
  - "Hollywood Shakedown"
- Part Four: L.A.
  - "Sex, Glitz, and Greed: The Seduction of O. J. Simpson"
  - "The Tooth of Crime"
  - "Bad Boys in Tinseltown"
  - "Let's Twist Again"
