= My Dark Places (book) =

Book by James Ellroy

- First edition
- Author: James Ellroy
- Language: English
- Subject: True crime, autobiography
- Publisher: Century
- Publication date: October 1996
- Publication place: United States
- Media type: Print (hardcover & paperback) and audio cassette
- Pages: 355 pp (first trade edition, hardcover)
- ISBN: 0-679-44185-9
- OCLC: 35620247
- Dewey Decimal: 813/.54 B 20
- LC Class: PS3555.L6274 Z466 1996

My Dark Places: An L.A. Crime Memoir is a 1996 book, part investigative journalism and part memoir, by American crime-fiction writer James Ellroy. Ellroy's mother Geneva was murdered in 1958, when he was 10 years old, and the killer was never identified. The book is Ellroy's account of his attempt to solve the mystery by hiring a retired Los Angeles County homicide detective to investigate the crime. Ellroy also explores how being directly affected by a crime shaped his life - often for the worse - and led him to write crime novels. The book is dedicated to his mother.

== Summary ==
James Ellroy's mother, Geneva "Jean" Ellroy, was found strangled by a roadside in El Monte, California, on June 22, 1958. Officers from the El Monte police department handed over the investigation to the Los Angeles County Sheriff’s Homicide Bureau. They chased down leads gathered from the scene and from anonymous tips sent in by residents. Newspaper accounts about the murder were scarce, as well as the television news accounts. Three other murders had occurred in El Monte in 1958 by that time, and all had been resolved quickly. After all the leads went dry, the Ellroy case was eventually abandoned and never solved.

Geneva's murder later contributed to James' fascination with another unsolved murder in Los Angeles: the January 1947 killing of Elizabeth Short. This murder, later called the "Black Dahlia case", bore some similarities to Jean Ellroy's murder. Both victims had been dumped by the roadside to be found by passersby. In his book, Ellroy describes the discovery of his mother’s body as a "classic late night body dump." Jean’s murder remained obscure because it lacked the grotesque details and media attention of the Dahlia murder.

In The Black Dahlia, Ellroy created a fictional story around the murder of Short. In My Dark Places, Ellroy writes a true crime memoir. Retired L.A. investigator Bill Stoner assisted Ellroy in his search for the killer. Ellroy had never seen the police file of his mother’s murder until he decided to write this book in the mid-1990s. After fifteen months of investigation, the crime remained unsolved, and any potential suspects are believed to be dead.

== Continuing investigation ==
After the final page of the memoir, there is a page that allows information to be sent pertaining to the investigation. It states: "The investigation continues. Information on the case can be forwarded to Detective Stoner either through the toll-free number, 1-800-717-6517, or his e-mail address, detstoner@earthlink.net."

== Critical reviews ==
The reviews for My Dark Places were quite positive. "Both a harrowing autobiography and a disturbingly fixed love story...blunt, graphic, and oddly exhilarating." —San Francisco Chronicle. "Strange and perversely fascinating....[My Dark Places] is part thriller, part screech of pain, part botched exorcism.... It is also a profoundly pessimistic meditation on the ubiquity of evil.... A candid chronicle of growing up weird under the sentence of unexpressed grief." —Newsday. "A dazzling memoir that reads half like a romance, half like the logbook for a homicide investigation.... My Dark Places is remarkable." —A. M. Homes, Bazaar. "A masterpiece.... Incredible, fascinating detail.... Ellroy is never anything but honest: All the scars are exposed... and best of all, it is all written in that familiar Ellroy style, each sentence like a finger jabbed in your chest.... This is a mesmerizing book." —Men's Journal. Ellroy's My Dark Places was a Time Best Book of the Year, as well as a New York Times Notable Book for 1996.

== Publication history ==
- Blakeney, Gloucestershire: Scorpion Press, 1996. Signed, limited edition.
- London: Century Books, October 1996. First trade edition.
- New York: Alfred A. Knopf, November 1996. First American edition.
  - For this edition, Ellroy signed (or rather initialed) 50,000 blank pages that were bound into each copy of the first printing.
- London: Arrow, June 1997. First British trade paperback.
- New York: Vintage, August 1997. First American trade paperback. (ISBN 0-679-76205-1)
