= Brown's Requiem (novel) =

1981 crime novel by James Ellroy

- First edition
- Author: James Ellroy
- Language: English
- Genre: Crime fiction
- Publisher: Avon Books
- Publication date: 1981
- Publication place: United States
- ISBN: 0-380-78741-5
- OCLC: 40254065
- Followed by: Clandestine (1982)

Brown's Requiem is a 1981 crime novel, the first novel by American author James Ellroy. Ellroy dedicated Brown's Requiem "to Randy Rice". Ellroy wrote the book while he worked as a caddie at the Bel-Air Country Club. Brown's Requiem was initially published in paperback in the US, by Avon Books, and the first hardback and first UK edition was published in 1984 by Allison and Busby. The novel was adapted into a 1998 film of the same title directed by Jason Freeland.

== Plot ==
German-American Los Angeles–based detective Fritz Brown is hired by the mysterious caddie Fat Dog Baker, who wants him to spy on his sister Jane and her benefactor, the much older businessman Sol Kupferman. Brown recognizes Kupferman as a man he had seen at the Club Utopia before it was burned down some years before. Brown suspects Fat Dog of being an arsonist and discovers that Kupferman owned Club Utopia through a proxy. Brown, thinking there might be a connection between the two men, decides to look for Fat Dog, who has disappeared and force him to confess but finds him dead in Mexico instead. He has been killed by Richard Ralston, with whom Fat Dog had started an illegal trade in social welfare benefits. Ralston failed to find a notebook where Fat Dog had meticulously noted their illegal transactions. Brown finds it and learns how Fat Dog, apart from the Utopia arson, had burned the houses where he had lived as foster child with his sister. Kupferman is their father, while their mother Louisa was a woman of the upper class who was forbidden from having anything to do with him because he was Jewish. To avoid scandal after Louisa's suicide, Kupferman gave the children to foster parents and bribed a corrupt officer, Haywood Cathcart, for buying his silence about the matter. Brown, who in the meantime has developed a crush on Jane, finds Cathcart out and kills him after making him confess his crimes.

== See also ==
- Brown's Requiem, a 1998 film adaptation
