= Brown's Requiem (film) =

1998 neo-noir film directed by Jason Freeland

- Release poster
- Directed by: Jason Freeland
- Screenplay by: Jason Freeland
- Based on: Brown's Requiem by James Ellroy
- Produced by: David Scott Rubin; Tim Youd
- Starring: Michael Rooker; Selma Blair; Kevin Corrigan
- Cinematography: Seo Mutarevic
- Edited by: Toby Yates
- Music by: Cynthia Millar
- Release dates: November 1998 (FLIFF); February 25, 2000 (United States)
- Running time: 104 minutes
- Country: United States
- Language: English
- Box office: $3,077

Brown's Requiem is a 1998 American crime film written and directed by Jason Freeland. Brown's Requiem was the 1981 debut novel by noted crime author James Ellroy, and his third to be adapted to film following L.A. Confidential in 1997, and Blood on the Moon (filmed under the title Cop) in 1987.

The film premiered at the Fort Lauderdale International Film Fest in November 1998, and was not released in the United States until over a year later on February 25, 2000.

== Plot ==
Fritz Brown is a disgraced former LAPD officer now working as a private investigator, part-time repo man and struggling on-the-wagon ex-alcoholic. Fritz is hired by an obese caddy named Freddy 'Fat Dog' Baker, supposedly to keep tabs on Fat Dog's sister, Jane. In the course of his investigation, Fritz learns that Jane is indeed living with an elderly millionaire named Solly Kupferman, and that their relationship is odd at best.

Fritz follows Solly and witnesses a transaction between Solly and Cathcart, the Internal Affairs Chief who disgraced Fritz and had him expelled from the police force Brown suspects Fat Dog of being an arsonist and discovers that Kupferman owned Club Utopia through a proxy. Brown, thinking there might be a connection between the two men, decides to look for Fat Dog, who has disappeared and force him to confess but finds him dead in Mexico instead. He has been killed by Richard Ralston, with whom Fat Dog had started an illegal trade in social welfare benefits. Ralston failed to find a notebook where Fat Dog had meticulously noted their illegal transactions.

Fritz soon finds himself involved in a complicated set of circumstances involving crooks, hit men, corrupt police and murder.

== Reception ==
On the review aggregator Rotten Tomatoes, 50% of six reviews are positive, with an average rating of 6.1/10.

The film garnered writer/director Jason Freeland the Prize of the City of Grândola at the Festróia-Tróia International Film Festival, and also received the Jury Award for Best Premiere at the Ft. Lauderdale International Film Festival.

== Cast ==
- Michael Rooker as Fritz Brown
- Will Sasso as "Fat Dog" Baker
- Selma Blair as Jane Baker
- Harold Gould as Solly "Solly K"
- Brion James as Cathcart
- Jack Conley as Ralston
- William Newman as Augie Dougal
- Brad Dourif as Wilson Edwards
- Christopher Meloni as Sergeant Cavanah
