= Blood's a Rover =

2009 novel by James Ellroy

- First US edition cover
- Author: James Ellroy
- Cover artist: Front-of-jacket photograph by Jeanne Hilary, Jacket design by Chip Kidd
- Language: English
- Series: Underworld USA Trilogy
- Genre: Crime novel, noir fiction, political fiction
- Publisher: Alfred A. Knopf, Windmill Books (Mass Market paperback)
- Publication date: September 22, 2009, June 3, 2010 (Mass Market paperback)
- Publication place: United States
- Media type: Print (hardback & paperback), unabridged audible audio edition, audio CD (both narrated by Craig Wasson), and Kindle
- Pages: 656 pp (first edition, hardcover)
- ISBN: 978-0-679-40393-7
- OCLC: 290466912
- Dewey Decimal: 813'/.54—dc22
- LC Class: PS3555.L6274B57 2009
- Preceded by: The Cold Six Thousand

James Ellroy talks about Blood's A Rover on Bookbits radio.

Blood's a Rover is a 2009 crime fiction novel by American author James Ellroy. It follows American Tabloid and The Cold Six Thousand as the final volume of Ellroy's Underworld USA Trilogy. A 10,000-word excerpt was published in the December 2008 issue of Playboy. The book was released on September 22, 2009.

== Plot introduction ==
The book's title and epigraph is taken from a poem titled "Reveille" by A. E. Housman:

Clay lies still, but blood's a rover;
Breath's a ware that will not keep.
Up, lad; when the journey's over

There'll be time enough for sleep.

Ellroy's literary agent, Sobel Weber Associates, posted a brief blurb for Blood's a Rover on its website in September 2008. It mentioned the novel's three protagonists and briefly outlined some of the novel's major plot points. These include the reappearance of Howard Hughes and J. Edgar Hoover, FBI infiltration into militant black power groups, Mafia activity in the Dominican Republic, and "voodoo vibe in Haiti."

== Ellroy on Blood's a Rover ==
Ellroy commented on the scope of Blood's a Rover several times during his tour to promote The Cold Six Thousand. When asked if he still saw Underworld U.S.A. as a trilogy, Ellroy responded, "American Tabloid is the first volume of my Underworld U.S.A. Trilogy. The Cold Six Thousand is my second. I will soon begin work on the epic third volume, a ghastly tale of political malfeasance and imperialistic bad juju from 1968 to 1972." He said the book would have "a different [prose] style entirely" than The Cold Six Thousand.

Ellroy said he would steer clear of the Watergate scandal: "The Cold Six Thousand... covers the matrix of American politics and crime from 1963 to 1968; the first, American Tabloid, covers 1958 to 1963; a third will proceed to 1972. You can see exactly where the story's going: the '68 election, the Mob's foreign casino plan, Nixon in office, all that. I'll stop short of Watergate, because Watergate bores me." He also told interviewer Robert Birnbaum, "[Watergate]'s been done to death. And most of the characters are still alive; thus you can't use them fictionally."

Ellroy addresses the book's strong racial overtone in an interview with Rolling Stone.

Oh yeah... You're supposed to be seduced and shocked by the casual racism in Blood's a Rover. This book is so full of race shit, it's fucking hilarious shit. There's a lot of scenes of black people and white people cracking jokes. And as much as the people grandstand about race in this book, they're driven by racial animus and the idea of racial reconciliation. Because of political correctness we are losing the outrageousness of humor. I always think of Frank O'Connor's line from a million years ago: "a literature that cannot be vulgarized is not literature at all and will not last."

== Style and structure ==
Ellroy again utilizes the "telegraphic" writing style previously found in the two previous books in the trilogy. "Document Inserts," journal entries, conversation transcripts, and redacted FBI profiles, again show character development and provide insights not readily evident in the narrative.

Character development focuses on several main characters: Dwight Chalfont "The Enforcer" Holly, Wayne Tedrow, Jr., and Donald Linscott "Crutch" Crutchfield (Don Crutchfield is a real person and private investigator, and Ellroy uses a real and fictional portrayal of him in Blood's a Rover). As well as journal entries from Karen Sifakis and Marshall E. "Marsh" Bowen. Later in the novel, characters Robert Sinclair "Scotty" Bennett and Joan Rosen Klein are focused on. Through the evolution of the story, right-winger Holly makes a sharp move to the left, while Tedrow's search for peace and redemption are supported by his relationship with African-American Mary Beth Hazzard, whose deceased husband he had shot and killed.

== Reviews ==
Reviewers were mostly positive about the book.

In The Dallas Morning News, Preston Jones wrote, "History is refracted and reflected through Ellroy's peerless paragraphs, lending a fresh urgency and a sense of rediscovery to events thoroughly analyzed. Blood's a Rover commands your attention from the first page and, thanks to its heft, makes reading in piecemeal fashion daunting. Ellroy's latest is American fiction at its finest, a dexterous, astounding achievement."

Mark Rahner, in his review for The Seattle Times, stated succinctly, "Verdict: so absorbing and satisfying that it's exhausting." He then went on to say:

You could possibly read it as a stand-alone. But why would you want to? And even having inhaled the previous two like a paint-huffing junkie, I sometimes felt like I was hanging on by my fingernails to keep everyone and everything straight in the big cast of characters and sprawling story that spans Los Angeles, Las Vegas, Chicago, Florida, Haiti and the Dominican Republic.

However, Carlo Wolff, in his review for the Pittsburgh Post-Gazette, took issue with Ellroy's character development. He stated, "... as in the earlier book, Ellroy hasn't lavished enough attention on character, a deficit his stylistic razzle-dazzle can't paper over." He continued, "Mastery of the cheap thrill doesn't carry no matter how amusing."

== Film adaptation ==
In 2016, it was announced that The Mark Gordon Company would produce and finance a film adaptation of Blood's a Rover, with Vincent Sieber and Clark Peterson as producers, and a script by Mark Fergus and Hawk Ostby. The film was to be set in 1968 Los Angeles, with characters Dwight Holly, J. Edgar Hoover, Scotty Bennett, and Joan Rosen Klein.
