= The Cold Six Thousand =

2001 novel by James Ellroy

- First American edition hardcover
- Author: James Ellroy
- Cover artist: Jacket design by Chip Kidd; Front-of-jacket photograph by Mell Kilpatrick
- Language: English
- Series: Underworld USA Trilogy
- Genre: Novel, crime fiction
- Publisher: Alfred A. Knopf
- Publication date: May 8, 2001
- Publication place: United States
- Media type: Print (hardcover & paperback), audio cassette, and audio download
- Pages: 672 pp (first American edition, hardback)
- ISBN: 0-679-40392-2 (first American edition, hardback)
- OCLC: 46867617
- Preceded by: American Tabloid
- Followed by: Blood's a Rover

The Cold Six Thousand is a 2001 crime fiction novel by James Ellroy. It is the first sequel to American Tabloid in the Underworld USA Trilogy and continues many of the earlier novel's characters and plotlines. Specifically, it follows three rogue American law-enforcement officials and their involvement in the turmoil of the 1960s.

== Plot ==
Ward Littell, former FBI agent turned high-powered Mafia lawyer, arrives in Dallas with J. Edgar Hoover's blessing to "manage" the investigation into John F. Kennedy's assassination and ensure a consensus: Lee Harvey Oswald acted alone. Pete Bondurant, whom Littell once arrested, but now is an uneasy friend and partner, is a veteran of the CIA's war against Fidel Castro and now the point-man for the Mafia's Las Vegas operations. Wayne Tedrow Jr., a US Army veteran and Las Vegas Police Department officer, is paid six thousand dollars to fly to Dallas and murder Wendell Durfee, a black pimp who has offended the casinos, and is thus thrust into the assassination's aftermath. As the tension over race relations and the Vietnam War builds and explodes throughout the 1960s, all three become involved in plots to kill Martin Luther King Jr. and Robert F. Kennedy.

== Structure and style ==
The Cold Six Thousand has a structure substantially similar to that of American Tabloid. As in American Tabloid, the chapters are divided into named Parts, and each chapter is numbered and identified by location and date. The action of the book is completely sequential, as the dates indicate. Each chapter has a limited third person narrative voice from the point of view of one of the three main characters. Interspersed between many chapters are "document inserts" reproducing newspaper clippings, letters, and transcripts of telephone calls. Flashbacks occur, but only in the present tense memory of the protagonists.

The highly stylized prose used in the main chapters builds upon the style used in American Tabloid (and, to a certain extent, White Jazz). Of the novel's style, Ellroy noted:

The style I developed for The Cold Six Thousand is a direct, shorter-rather-than-longer sentence style that's declarative and ugly and right there, punching you in the nards. It was appropriate for that book, and that book only, because it's the 1960s. It's largely the story of reactionaries in America during that time, largely a novel of racism and thus the racial invective, and the overall bluntness and ugliness of the language.

== Film adaptation ==
In 2002, Bruce Willis optioned the rights to produce and star in a TV miniseries based on American Tabloid and The Cold Six-Thousand. Willis's option expired before production began.

In 2008, HBO and Tom Hanks's production company, Playtone, were developing Tabloid and Six Thousand for either a mini-series or ongoing series. Screenwriter Kirk Ellis was said to be drafting a screenplay for the potential series.
