= James Ellroy =

American writer (born 1948)

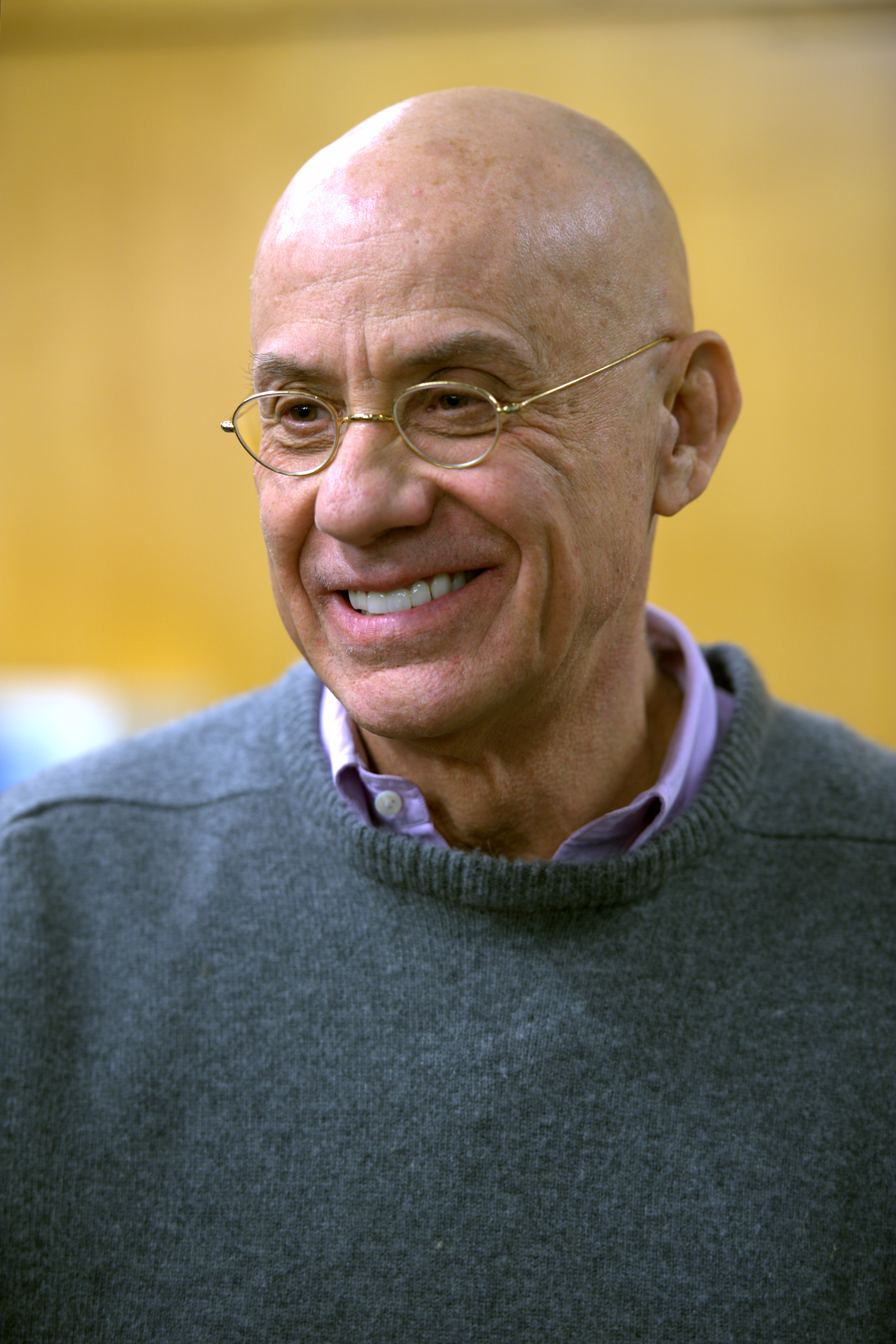
- Ellroy in 2011
- Born: Lee Earle Ellroy; March 4, 1948 (age 78); Los Angeles, California, U.S.
- Education: Fairfax High School (expelled)
- Occupations: Crime writer, essayist
- Spouses: Mary Doherty (m. 1988; div. 1991) Helen Knode (m. 1991; div. 2006)
- Partner: Erika Schickel (sep.)
- Writing career
- Years active: 1979–present
- Genres: Crime fiction, historical fiction, mystery fiction, noir fiction
- Notable works: Lloyd Hopkins Trilogy; L.A. Quartet; Underworld USA Trilogy; My Dark Places
- Military career
- Allegiance: United States
- Branch: United States Army
- Service years: 1965 (3 months)
- Website: jamesellroy.net

Lee Earle "James" Ellroy (born March 4, 1948) is an American crime fiction writer and essayist.

== Life ==
=== Early life ===
Lee Earle "James" Ellroy was born in Los Angeles, California. His mother, Geneva Odelia (née Hilliker), was a nurse. His father, Armand, was an accountant and a onetime business manager of Rita Hayworth. His parents divorced in 1954, after which Ellroy and his mother moved to the suburb, El Monte.

At the age of seven, Ellroy saw his mother naked and began to sexually fantasize about her. He struggled in youth with this obsession, as he held a psycho-sexual relationship with her, and tried to catch glimpses of her nude. Ellroy stated that "I lived for naked glimpses. I hated her and lusted for her..."

On June 22, 1958, when Ellroy was 10 years old, his mother was raped and murdered. Ellroy later described his mother as "sharp-tongued [and] bad-tempered", unable to keep a steady job, alcoholic, and sexually promiscuous. His first reaction upon hearing of her death was relief: he could now live with his father, whom he preferred. His father was more permissive and allowed Ellroy to do as he pleased, namely be "left alone to read, to go out and peep through windows, prowl around and sniff the air." The police never found his mother's killer, and the case remains unsolved. The murder, along with reading The Badge by Jack Webb (a book comprising sensational cases from the files of the Los Angeles Police Department, a birthday gift from his father), were important events of Ellroy's youth.

Ellroy's inability to come to terms with the emotions surrounding his mother's murder led him to transfer them onto another murder victim, Elizabeth Short. Nicknamed the "Black Dahlia," Short was a young woman murdered in 1947, her body cut in half and discarded in Los Angeles, in a notorious and unsolved crime. Throughout his youth, Ellroy used Short as a surrogate for his conflicting emotions and desires. His confusion and trauma led to a period of intense clinical depression, from which he recovered only gradually.

=== Education ===
In 1962, Ellroy began to attend Fairfax High School, a predominantly Jewish high school. While in high school, he began to engage in a variety of outrageous acts, many anti-Semitic in nature. He joined the American Nazi Party, purchased Nazi paraphernalia, sang the Horst-Wessel-Lied at school, mailed Nazi pamphlets to girls he liked, openly criticized John F. Kennedy, and advocated for the reinstatement of slavery. His "Crazy Man Act", as Ellroy describes it, was a plea for attention and got him beaten up and eventually expelled from Fairfax High School in 11th grade, after ranting about Nazism in his English class.

Ellroy's father died soon after this, with his father's last words to him being, "Try to pick up every waitress who serves you."

=== Early career ===
After being expelled from high school, Ellroy then joined the U.S. Army for a short period of time. On enlisting, Ellroy soon decided he did not belong there and convinced an army psychiatrist he was unfit for combat. He was discharged after three months.

Ellroy credits the public libraries of Los Angeles County as the basis of his writing. He shelved books at the public library. In a speech at the Library of Congress in 2019 he declared: "I am a product of the L.A. County Public Library System." During his teens and 20s, Ellroy drank heavily and abused Benzedrex inhalers. He was engaged in minor crimes (especially shoplifting, house-breaking, and burglary) and was often homeless. After serving some time in jail and suffering from pneumonia, during which he developed an abscess on his lung "the size of a large man's fist," Ellroy stopped drinking and began working as a golf caddie while pursuing writing. He later said, "Caddying was good tax-free cash and allowed me to get home by 2 p.m. and write books.... I caddied right up to the sale of my fifth book." Ellroy has also summed up his life by saying: "Boy's mother murdered. Boy's life shattered. Boy grows up homeless alcoholic jailbird. Jailbird cleans up and writes his way to salvation. Jailbird becomes the Mad Dog of American Crime Fiction."

=== Personal life ===
On October 4, 1991, Ellroy married writer and critic Helen Knode. The couple moved from California to Kansas City in 1995. In 2006, after their divorce, Ellroy returned to Los Angeles. The two later reconciled and moved to Denver, although Ellroy has stated that they live in separate apartments in the same building. He frequently tells interviewers that the issue for him is not monogamy, but cohabitation.

Ellroy joined Alcoholics Anonymous in the 1970s.

== Literary career ==
In 1981, Ellroy published his first novel, Brown's Requiem, a detective story drawing on his experiences as a caddie. He then published Clandestine and Silent Terror (which was later published under the title Killer on the Road). Ellroy followed these three novels with the Lloyd Hopkins Trilogy. The novels are centered on Hopkins, a brilliant but disturbed LAPD robbery-homicide detective, and are set mainly in the 1980s.

He is a self-described recluse who possesses very few technological amenities, including television, and claims never to read contemporary books by other authors, aside from Joseph Wambaugh's The Onion Field, out of concern that they might influence his own. However, this does not mean that Ellroy does not read at all, as he claims in My Dark Places to have read at least two books a week growing up, eventually shoplifting more to satisfy his love of reading. He then goes on to say that he read works by Dashiell Hammett and Raymond Chandler.

=== Writing style ===
Hallmarks of his work include dense plotting and a relentlessly pessimistic—albeit moral—worldview. His work has earned Ellroy the nickname "Demon dog of American crime fiction."

Ellroy writes longhand on legal pads rather than on a computer. He prepares elaborate outlines for his books, most of which are several hundred pages long.

Dialogue and narration in Ellroy novels often consists of a "heightened pastiche of jazz slang, cop patois, creative profanity and drug vernacular" with a particular use of period-appropriate slang. He often employs a sort of telegraphese (stripped-down, staccato-like sentence structures), a style that reaches its apex in The Cold Six Thousand. Ellroy describes it as a "direct, shorter-rather-than-longer sentence style that's declarative and ugly and right there, punching you in the nards." This signature style is not the result of a conscious experimentation but of chance and came about when he was asked by his editor to shorten his novel L.A. Confidential by more than one hundred pages. Rather than removing any subplots, Ellroy abbreviated the novel by cutting every unnecessary word from every sentence, creating a unique style of prose. While each sentence on its own is simple, the cumulative effect is a dense, baroque style.

=== The L.A. Quartet ===
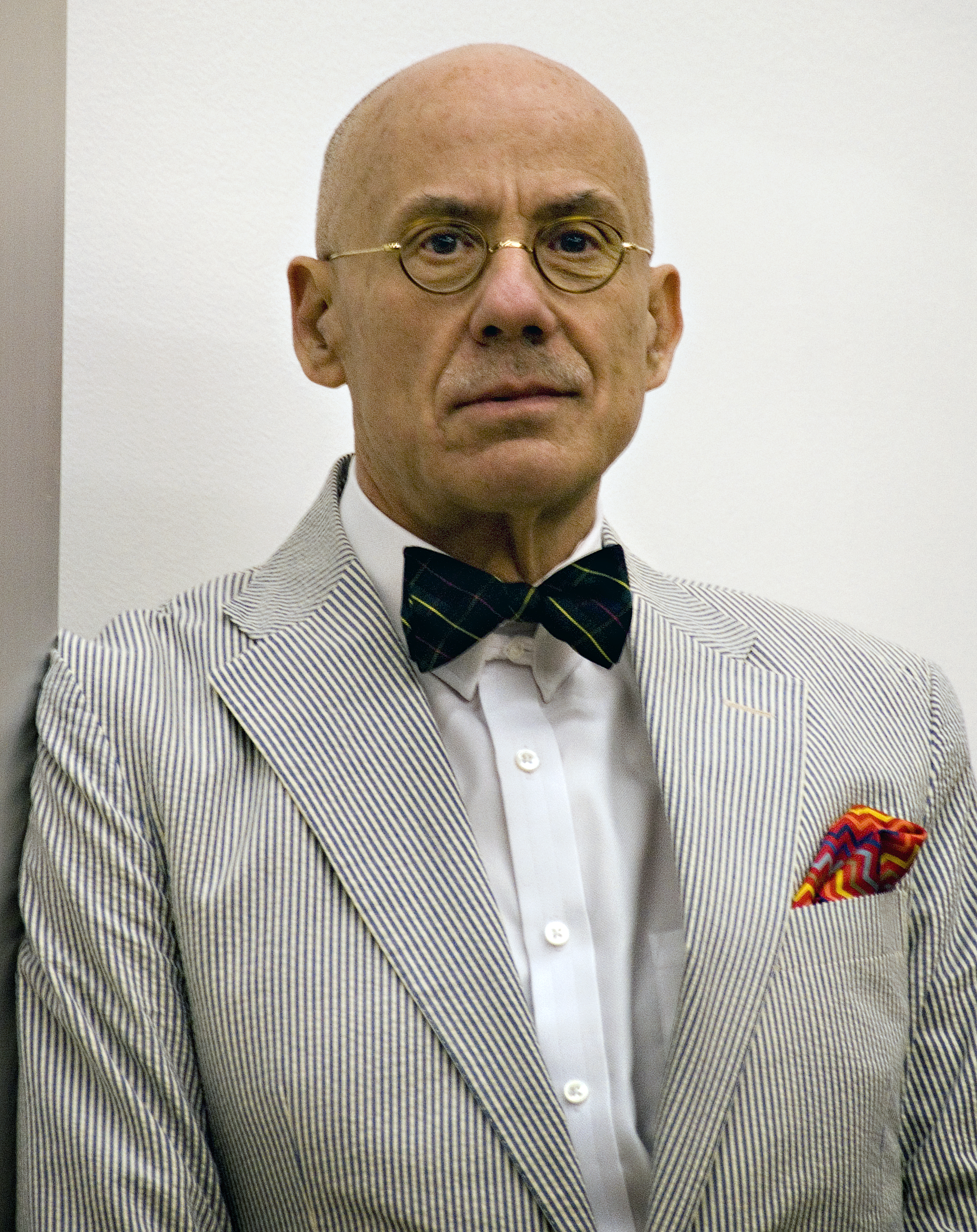
Ellroy at the LA Times Festival of Books, April 2009

While his early novels earned him a cult following and notice among crime fiction buffs, Ellroy earned much greater success and critical acclaim with the L.A. Quartet—The Black Dahlia, The Big Nowhere, L.A. Confidential, and White Jazz. The four novels represent Ellroy's change of style from the tradition of classic modernist noir fiction of his earlier novels to what has been classified as postmodern historiographic metafiction. The Black Dahlia, for example, fused the real-life murder of Elizabeth Short with a fictional story of two police officers investigating the crime.

=== Underworld USA Trilogy ===
In 1995, Ellroy published American Tabloid, the first novel in a series informally dubbed the "Underworld USA Trilogy" that Ellroy describes as a "secret history" of the mid-to-late 20th century. Tabloid was named TIME's fiction book of the year for 1995. Its follow-up, The Cold Six Thousand, became a bestseller. The final novel, Blood's a Rover, was released on September 22, 2009.

=== My Dark Places ===
After publishing American Tabloid, Ellroy began a memoir, My Dark Places, based on his memories of his mother's murder, the unconventional relationship he had with her, and his investigation of the crime. In the memoir, Ellroy mentions that his mother's murder received little news coverage because the media were still fixated on the stabbing death of mobster Johnny Stompanato, who was dating actress Lana Turner. Frank C. Girardot, a reporter for The San Gabriel Valley Tribune, accessed files on Geneva Hilliker Ellroy's murder from detectives with Los Angeles Police Department. Based on the cold case file, Ellroy and investigator Bill Stoner worked the case but gave up after 15 months, believing any suspects to be dead. After the final pages of My Dark Places, a contact page is provided, stating: "The investigation continues. Information on the case can be forwarded to Detective Stoner either through the toll-free number, 1-800-717-6517, or his e-mail address, detstoner@earthlink.net." In 2008, The Library of America selected the essay "My Mother's Killer" from My Dark Places for inclusion in its two-century retrospective of American True Crime.

=== Other ===
Ellroy began a "Second L.A. Quartet" taking place during the Second World War, with some characters from the first L.A. Quartet and the Underworld USA Trilogy reappearing in younger depictions. The first book, Perfidia, was released on September 9, 2014. The second book is titled This Storm, which had a release date of May 14, 2019. It was released on May 30, 2019, in the United Kingdom, and June 4, 2019, in the United States.

In 2023, at the LA Times Festival of Books, Ellroy revealed, in light of his latest book The Enchanters and his editors' response to it, that his planned "Second L.A. Quartet" would become a quintet, with The Enchanters being the third of five books in the series. The later books in the series will be set in the 1960s and will tie back in to the World War II setting, Japanese internment and the immediate post-war setting initially established in Perfidia and This Storm.

A Waterstones exclusive limited edition of Perfidia was published two days after its initial release and included an essay by Ellroy titled "Ellroy's History—Then and Now".. Ellroy dedicated Perfidia "To Lisa Stafford". The epigraph is "Envy thou not the oppressor, And choose none of his ways" from Proverbs 3:31.

In collaboration with the Los Angeles Police Museum and Glynn Martin, the museum's executive director, Ellroy released LAPD '53 on May 19, 2015. Photography from the museum's archives are presented alongside Ellroy's writings about crime and law enforcement during that era.

In the fall of 2017, Ellroy investigated the murder of Sal Mineo. Reminiscent of how he investigated his mother's unsolved murder, Ellroy worked with Glynn Martin, an ex-LAPD officer, the LAPD Museum's current executive director, and co-author of LAPD '53. Ellroy wrote about this investigation for The Hollywood Reporter in digital form on December 21, 2018, and it also appeared in published form in the December 18, 2018, issue of The Hollywood Reporter magazine.

Early in January 2019, Ellroy posted news on jamesellroy.net, writing: "I'm digitally illiterate, so you’ve got to gas on the fact that I'm breaking baaaaaaaaad from tradition, in order to post this announcement." Ellroy posted that he had been inducted into the Everyman's Library series. Three Everyman's Library editions have been reprinted: The L.A. Quartet, The Underworld U.S.A. Trilogy, Volume I and The Underworld U.S.A. Trilogy, Volume II. The release dates for these editions, as well as This Storm: A Novel, was June 4, 2019. Ellroy added, "Stay stirringly tuned to this website for further updates", and simply signed the finished post Ellroy, inserting a dog's pawprint below it.

In 2022, Ellroy, a long-time fan of Chester Himes, wrote the introduction to Himes's classic A Rage in Harlem. In his hard-bitten style, Ellroy raves that "A Rage in Harlem features a mind-mauling array of chump-change hustles, lurid larcenies, and malicious mischief." The novel was originally published in France in 1958, where it won France's Grand Prix de Littérature Policière, and was most recently re-published by Vintage Books.

== Public life and views ==
In media appearances, Ellroy has adopted an outsized, stylized public persona of hard-boiled nihilism and self-reflexive subversiveness. He frequently begins public appearances with a monologue such as:

Good evening peepers, prowlers, pederasts, panty-sniffers, punks and pimps. I'm James Ellroy, the demon dog with the hog-log, the foul owl with the death growl, the white knight of the far right, and the slick trick with the donkey dick. I'm the author of 16 books, masterpieces all; they precede all my future masterpieces. These books will leave you reamed, steamed and drycleaned, tie-dyed, swept to the side, true-blued, tattooed and bah fongooed. These are books for the whole fuckin' family, if the name of your family is Manson.

Another aspect of his public persona involves an almost comically grand assessment of his work and his place in literature. For example, he told The New York Times: "I am a master of fiction. I am also the greatest crime novelist who ever lived. I am to the crime novel in specific what Tolstoy is to the Russian novel and what Beethoven is to music."

Structurally, several of Ellroy's books, such as The Big Nowhere, L.A. Confidential, American Tabloid, and The Cold Six Thousand, have three disparate points of view through different characters, with chapters alternating between them. Starting with The Black Dahlia, Ellroy's novels have mostly been historical dramas about the relationship between corruption and law enforcement.

A predominant theme of Ellroy's work is the myth of "closure". "Closure is bullshit", Ellroy often remarks, "and I would love to find the man who invented closure and shove a giant closure plaque up his ass." In his works characters often die or vanish quickly before otherwise traditional closure points in order to capitalize this idea.

In 2017, Ellroy claimed that he is done writing noir crime novels. "I write big political books now," he says. "I want to write about LA exclusively for the rest of my career. I don't know where and when."

On April 29, 2015, Ellroy and Lois Duncan were the Grandmasters at the 2015 Edgar Awards.

=== Politics ===
Ellroy has frequently espoused conservative political views. In 2019, Ellroy described himself as anti-totalitarian, conservative, and a Tory, adding "Underneath my profane exterior, I'm very concerned with decorum, with probity, with morality, and I have a painfully developed conscience. I despise unconscionable acts, whoever is perpetrating them."

In a 2009 interview, Ellroy said that in the 1960s and 1970s "I was never a peacemaker; I was a fuck-you right-winger." He has also been an outspoken and unquestioning admirer of the Los Angeles Police Department (despite his explicit depictions of brutality and corruption of the department in his novels), dismissing its flaws as aberrations. He has said that the Rodney King beating and Rampart police scandals were overblown by a biased media. Nevertheless, like other aspects of his persona, he often deliberately obscures where his public persona ends and his actual views begin. When asked about his "right-wing tendencies", he told an interviewer, "Right-wing tendencies? I do that to fuck with people." Similarly, in the film Feast of Death, his (now ex-) wife describes his politics as "bullshit", an assessment to which Ellroy responds only with a knowing smile. Privately, Ellroy opposes the death penalty.

In 2001, Ellroy stated that he is opposed to gun control. In the 2000 presidential election, Ellroy voted for George W. Bush "because I wanted to repudiate Gore and Clintonism and nobody hates Bill Clinton more than me..." In 2009, he called Bush a "slimeball and the most disastrous American president in recent times." He stated that he voted for Barack Obama, though later denied doing so, while adding that most of his statements on modern politics are willful misrepresentations.

Ellroy has frequently shared his thoughts on politicians and political candidates. He has called Hillary Clinton a "bull dyke in a pantsuit", compared John McCain to Mr. Magoo, Joe Biden to Daffy Duck, and said that "Obama looks like a f---ing lemur, a little rodent-like creature, a marsupial or something." He has praised President Ronald Reagan on several occasions, calling him a "titanic human being." On President Donald Trump, Ellroy stated that he "doesn't have the charm of a true, world-class dictator", but also understands his appeal, as "He's the big 'fuck you' to all pieties."

In 2022, Ellroy stated that he no longer followed contemporary politics.

=== Religion ===
Following his parents' divorce, Ellroy was sent to a Dutch Lutheran Church by his mother every Sunday. In 2004, Ellroy had stated "I had a Christian upbringing of sorts, Lutheran. I don't go to church. I can't say I'm a Christian."

However, in 2013, Ellroy stated "I'm a Christian. I'm not an Evangelical Christian, but God and religious spiritual feelings always guided me during the worst moments of my life, and I don't for a moment doubt it." In 2014, Ellroy stated that "I'm a Christian. I believe we are all one soul united in God", adding that he is "conservative and theocratic".

Ellroy has stated that his faith has influenced his novels, describing them as "stories of redemption." He described his 2021 novel Widespread Panic as "very much a Christian novel."

== Film adaptations and screenplays ==
Several of Ellroy's works have been adapted to film, including Blood on the Moon (adapted as Cop), L.A. Confidential, Brown's Requiem, Killer on the Road/Silent Terror (adapted as Stay Clean), and The Black Dahlia. In each instance, screenplays based on Ellroy's work were written by other screenwriters.

While he has frequently been disappointed by these adaptations (such as Cop), he was very complimentary of Curtis Hanson and Brian Helgeland's screenplay for L.A. Confidential at the time of its release. In succeeding years, however, his comments have been more reserved:

L.A. Confidential, the movie, is the best thing that happened to me in my career that I had absolutely nothing to do with. It was a fluke—and a wonderful one—and it is never going to happen again—a movie of that quality. Here's my final comment on L.A. Confidential, the movie: I go to a video store in Prairie Village, Kansas. The youngsters who work there know me as the guy who wrote L.A. Confidential. They tell all the little old ladies who come in there to get their G-rated family flick. They come up to me, they say, "OOOO... you wrote L.A. Confidential... Oh, what a wonderful, wonderful movie. I saw it four times. You don't see storytelling like that on the screen anymore." ...I smile, I say, "Yes, it's a wonderful movie, and a salutary adaptation of my wonderful novel. But listen, Granny: You love the movie. Did you go out and buy the book?" And Granny invariably says, "Well, no, I didn't." And I say to Granny, "Then what the fuck good are you to me?"

Shortly after viewing three hours of unedited footage for Brian De Palma's adaptation of The Black Dahlia, Ellroy wrote an essay, "Hillikers", praising De Palma and his film. Ultimately, nearly an hour was removed from the final cut. Of the released film, Ellroy told the Seattle Post-Intelligencer, "Look, you're not going to get me to say anything negative about the movie, so you might as well give up." He had, however, mocked the film's director, cast, and production design before it was filmed.

Ellroy co-wrote the original screenplay for the 2008 film Street Kings but refused to do any publicity for the finished film.

In September 2008, Daily Variety reported that HBO, along with Tom Hanks's production company, Playtone, was developing American Tabloid and The Cold Six Thousand for either a miniseries or ongoing series.

In a September 2009 interview, Ellroy himself stated, "All movie adaptations of my books are dead." In a November 2012 interview, when asked about how movie adaptations distort his books, he remarked, "[Film studios] can do whatever the [fuck] they want as long as they pay me." As of 2023, Ellroy refuses to answer any questions about both the film adaptions of his books or the scripts he wrote in the 2000s.

In an October 2017 interview with The New York Times, Tom Hanks stated he would be interested in playing the part of Lloyd Hopkins if a film or stage adaptation was put into production.

In February 2024, it was reported Ellroy had signed on with Hollywood talent agency UTA and that producers were shopping around a film adaption of his then-latest novel The Enchanters.

== Published works ==
=== Stand-alone novels ===
- Brown's Requiem (1981)
- Clandestine (1982)
- Killer on the Road (originally published as Silent Terror) (1986)

=== Lloyd Hopkins Trilogy ===
- Blood on the Moon (1984)
- Because the Night (1984)
- Suicide Hill (1986)

=== L.A. Quartet ===
- The Black Dahlia (1987)
- The Big Nowhere (1988)
- L.A. Confidential (1990)
- White Jazz (1992)

=== Underworld USA Trilogy ===
- American Tabloid (1995)
- The Cold Six Thousand (2001)
- Blood's a Rover (2009)

=== L.A. Quintet (Formerly the Second L.A. Quartet) ===
- Perfidia (2014)
- This Storm (2019)

=== Fred Otash ===
- Widespread Panic (2021)
- The Enchanters (2023)
- Red Sheet (2026)

=== Short stories and essays ===
- Dick Contino's Blues (issue number 46 of Granta magazine, Winter 1994)
- Hollywood Nocturnes (1994; UK title: Dick Contino's Blues and Other Stories)
- Crime Wave (1999)
- Destination: Morgue! (2004)
- Shakedown (2012) (e-book) ISBN 978-1-61452-047-4
- LAPD '53 (2015)

=== Autobiography ===
- My Dark Places (1996)
- The Hilliker Curse: My Pursuit of Women (2010)

=== Editor ===
- The Best American Mystery Stories 2002 (2002)
- The Best American Crime Writing 2005 (2005)
- Ellroy, James; Penzler, Otto, eds. (2010). The Best American Noir of the Century. Houghton Mifflin Harcourt. ISBN 978-0-547-33077-8. (Note: Part of The Best American Series)

=== 2019 Everyman's Library Collections ===
- The L.A. Quartet (2019)--collection of the LA Quartet as one volume.
- The Underworld U.S.A. Trilogy, Volume I (2019)--collection featuring American Tabloid and the Cold Six Thousand
- The Underworld U.S.A Trilogy, Volume II (2019)--collection featuring Blood's a Rover

=== Other works, influences, and adaptations ===
- L.A. Noir (1997)--omnibus collection of the Lloyd Hopkins Trilogy
- Ellroy, James (December 21, 2018). "James Ellroy: Cracking the Case of Murdered Actor Sal Mineo". The Hollywood Reporter. Archived from the original on January 2, 2019.
- Powell, Steven, ed. (2018). The Big Somewhere: Essays on James Ellroy's Noir World. Bloomsbury Publishing. ISBN 978-15013-3133-6.
- Matz; Fincher, David (2016). Hahn, Sierra (ed.). The Black Dahlia: A Crime Graphic Novel (1st ed.). Archaia Entertainment, Boom! Studios. ISBN 978-1-60886-868-1.
- ((Love Me Fierce in Danger: The Life of James Ellroy by Steven Powell - Published 2023.))

== Filmography ==
=== Documentaries ===
- 1993: James Ellroy: Demon Dog of American Crime Fiction
- 1995: White Jazz
- 2001: James Ellroy's Feast of Death
- 2005: James Ellroy: American Dog
- 2006: Murder by the Book: "James Ellroy"
- 2011: James Ellroy's L.A.: City of Demons

=== Films ===
- 1988: Cop
- 1997: L.A. Confidential
- 1998: Brown's Requiem
- 2002: Stay Clean
- 2002: Vakvagany
- 2002: Dark Blue
- 2003: Das Bus
- 2005: James Ellroy presents Bazaar Bizarre
- 2006: The Black Dahlia
- 2008: Street Kings
- 2008: Land of the Living
- 2011: Rampart

=== Television ===
- 1992: "Since I Don't Have You" adapted by Steven A. Katz for Showtime's Fallen Angels.
- 2011: James Ellroy's L.A.: City of Demons for Investigation Discovery. James Ellroy's L.A.: City of Demons at IMDb
