= List of people from Bennington, Vermont =

The following list includes notable people who were born or have lived in Bennington, Vermont.

== Artists and entertainers ==
- Pamela Blair, actress, singer and dancer (Val in the musical A Chorus Line); born in Bennington
- Henry Brant, composer, awarded the Pulitzer Prize for Music (2002); taught at Bennington College
- Carleton Carpenter, actor (Summer Stock); born in Bennington
- Helen Frankenthaler, painter; attended Bennington College
- Robert Frost, poet, four time Pulitzer Prize winner; lived and buried in Bennington
- Cynthia Gibb, actress and former model (Suzi on Search for Tomorrow); born in Bennington
- Milford Graves, free jazz drummer, percussion musician; instructor at Bennington College
- Miles Hyman, author and illustrator
- Stanley Edgar Hyman, literary critic; instructor at Bennington College
- Shirley Jackson, novelist and short story writer, author of "The Lottery"; Wife of Stanley Edgar Hyman; lived in Bennington
- Jamaica Kincaid, novelist (Lucy); lived in Bennington
- Ray Magliozzi, co-host of NPR's weekly radio show, Car Talk; taught science in Bennington
- Bernard Malamud, novelist and short story writer; taught at Bennington College
- Jules Olitski, painter; taught at Bennington College (1963–1967)
- Mary Oliver, poet; lived in Bennington
- Beverley Owen, actress; lived and died in Bennington
- Allen Shawn, composer; instructor at Bennington College
- David Smith, sculptor
- R. John Wright, doll designer and maker; lives in Bennington

== Professionals ==
- Ethan Allen, soldier, author, philosopher, land speculator and businessman
- Hiram Bingham, missionary
- William L. Burke, professor
- Edward Hamlin Everett, founder of the Bennington Museum
- Lydia Mary Fay (1804–1878), missionary, educator, writer, and translator
- Nathaniel Fillmore, farmer and father of President Millard Fillmore
- James Fisk Jr., financier
- Simon Fraser, fur trader and explorer
- Daniel Williams Harmon, fur trader and diarist
- Anthony Haswell, printer, journalist and free speech champion
- Herbert William Heinrich, industrial safety pioneer
- Horace Chapin Henry, businessman and art gallery founder
- Alfred Lebbeus Loomis, physician
- Alexander Nemerov, art historian
- Trenor W. Park, lawyer, businessman, politician and philanthropist
- Isaac G. Perry, architect
- Henry W. Putnam, inventor, manufacturer, businessman and philanthropist
- John Spargo, author, historian and socialist intellectual
- John F. Winslow, industrialist and college president

== Military ==
- Reginald W. Buzzell, U.S. Army brigadier general, resided in Bennington
- David Fay, participant in the Battle of Bennington during the American Revolution, adjutant general of the Vermont Militia during the War of 1812, judge of the Vermont Supreme Court
- David Robinson, major general in the state militia and U.S. marshal for Vermont
- Seth Warner, officer in the Green Mountain Boys

== Murderers ==
- Mary Rogers, murderer
- Elizabeth Van Valkenburgh, murderer

== Law ==
- Orion M. Barber, U.S. federal judge
- Samuel H. Blackmer, associate justice of the Vermont Supreme Court
- Charles Dewey Day, superior court judge in Canada
- John Fassett Jr., justice of the Vermont Supreme Court
- David Fay, justice of the Vermont Supreme Court
- Jonas Fay, justice of the Vermont Supreme Court
- James Stuart Holden, federal judge
- Pierpoint Isham, justice of the Vermont Supreme Court
- John Robinson, US marshal for Vermont

== Politics ==
- Howard E. Armstrong, Secretary of State of Vermont
- Peter J. Brady, member of the Vermont House of Representatives
- Elijah Brush, second mayor of Detroit, Michigan
- T. Garry Buckley, lieutenant governor of Vermont
- Brian Campion, member of the Vermont Senate
- Nathan Clark, speaker of the Vermont House of Representatives
- Timothy R. Corcoran, member of the Vermont House of Representatives and Bennington town clerk
- Timothy Corcoran II, member of the Vermont House of Representatives
- Charles Hial Darling, Assistant Secretary of the Navy
- Joseph Fay, Secretary of State of Vermont
- Abraham B. Gardner, lieutenant governor of Vermont
- Hiland Hall, U.S. congressman, governor of Vermont
- Emory S. Harris, US marshal for Vermont
- Robert E. Healy, member of the U.S. Securities and Exchange Commission, associate justice of the Vermont Supreme Court
- Albert Krawczyk, member of the Vermont House of Representatives
- Frederick S. Lovell, Wisconsin state legislator, and Union Army officer in the American Civil War
- Fred C. Martin, member of the Vermont House of Representatives and US internal revenue collector for Vermont
- John G. McCullough, governor of Vermont
- Orsamus Cook Merrill, U.S. congressman
- Joseph Naper, member of the Illinois House of Representatives and founder of Naperville, Illinois
- Jesse O. Norton, U.S. congressman
- Paul Offner, educator and Wisconsin state legislator
- Robert Plunkett 1998, member of the Vermont Senate
- Jonathan Robinson, US senator
- Moses Robinson, U.S. senator and governor of Vermont prior to statehood
- Richard W. Sears, member of the Vermont Senate
- Mark Shepard, member of the Vermont Senate
- Benjamin Swift, U.S. senator
- Isaac Tichenor, jurist, U.S. senator and the 5th Governor of Vermont
- David S. Walbridge, U.S. congressman
- Stephen K. Williams, member of the New York State Senate
- William Henry Wills, governor of Vermont
- Ralph G. Wright, speaker of the Vermont House of Representatives

== Sports ==
- Pete Corey, Hall of Fame auto racing driver
- Peter Graves, Olympic announcer and cross-country ski coach for Harvard University
- Andrew Newell, Olympic cross country skier
- Betsy Shaw, Olympic snowboarder
