= The Black Dahlia (novel) =

1987 novel by James Ellroy

- 1st ed. cover
- Author: James Ellroy
- Cover artist: Jacket design by Paul Gamarello; Jacket illustration by Stephen Peringer; Art direction by Barbara Buck
- Language: English
- Series: L.A. Quartet
- Genre: Crime fiction, noir, historical fiction
- Publisher: The Mysterious Press
- Publication date: September 1987
- Publication place: United States
- Media type: Print (hardcover & paperback), audio cassette, audio CD, and audio download
- Pages: 325 pp (1st ed., hardcover)
- ISBN: 0-89296-206-2 (1st ed., hardcover)
- OCLC: 15517895
- Dewey Decimal: 813/.54 19
- LC Class: PS3555.L6274 B53 1987
- Preceded by: Killer on the Road (1986)
- Followed by: The Big Nowhere (1988)

The Black Dahlia (1987) is a crime fiction novel by American author James Ellroy. Its subject is the 1947 murder of Elizabeth Short in Los Angeles, California, which received wide attention because her corpse was horrifically mutilated and discarded in an empty residential lot. The investigation ultimately led to a broad police corruption scandal. While rooted in the facts of the Short murder and featuring many real-life people, places and events, Ellroy's novel blends facts and fiction, most notably in providing a solution to the crime when in reality it has never been solved. James Ellroy dedicated The Black Dahlia, "To Geneva Hilliker Ellroy 1915-1958 Mother: Twenty-nine Years Later, This Valediction in Blood." The epigraph for The Black Dahlia is "Now I fold you down, my drunkard, my navigator, My first lost keeper, to love and look at later. -Anne Sexton."

This book is considered the one that gained Ellroy critical attention as a serious writer of literature, expanding his renown beyond the crime novels of his early career. The Black Dahlia is the first book in Ellroy's L.A. Quartet, a cycle of novels set in 1940s and 1950s Los Angeles. He portrays the city in this period as a hotbed of political corruption and depravity. The Quartet continues with The Big Nowhere, L.A. Confidential, and White Jazz.

The novel was adapted to film in 2006, and into a graphic novel in 2013.

== Synopsis ==
In 1946, the Los Angeles Police Department arranges a boxing match between patrolmen Dwight "Bucky" Bleichert and Lee Blanchard as a publicity stunt. The fight is promoted as "Fire versus Ice", reflecting their contrasting boxing styles and personalities. Bucky is cautious and reserved, racked with guilt over his betrayal of two Japanese-American friends (resulting in their wartime internment) and involvement in violently suppressing the Zoot Suit Riots. By contrast, Lee is outgoing and jovial, already famous for catching the notorious bank robber Bobby De Witt. Lee is openly cohabiting with De Witt's girlfriend, Kay Lake, in violation of LAPD policy, after having met her at the trial.

Bucky and Lee are promoted to plainclothes jobs in the Warrants Division and are subsequently partnered together. Bucky quickly forms a close bond with Lee and Kay, seeing them as a surrogate family. Kay becomes attracted to Bucky and attempts to seduce him, revealing that her relationship with Lee is platonic, but Bucky nevertheless rebuffs her advances in order to avoid upsetting the harmonious friendship between the three of them.

In January 1947, the hideously mutilated body of Elizabeth Short is discovered. The killing, which the press dub "Black Dahlia," reminds Lee of the unsolved disappearance of his younger sister Laurie, prompting him to volunteer himself and Bucky for the investigation. Another detective, the thuggish Fritz Vogel, is in cahoots with Assistant DA Ellis Loew, who hopes to use the case to launch his political career. Vogel and Loew repeatedly try to frame innocent men in order to close the case quickly. Bucky is initially resentful of his and Lee's involvement in the case but gradually becomes obsessed with Short as he learns about her chaotic and unhappy life.

One line of enquiry leads Bucky to Madeleine Sprague, a spoiled socialite who closely resembles Short and was involved in a lesbian relationship with her. In exchange for Bucky suppressing evidence about her involvement, Madeleine has sex with him, causing him to fantasize that she is Short. Bucky meets the rest of Madeleine's family, consisting of her tyrannical father Emmett, an amoral property developer; her sickly mother Ramona; and her sister Martha, an aspiring artist. He also learns about George Tilden, an old friend of Emmett's who was badly disfigured in a car crash and subsequently became a reclusive handyman on Emmett's estate.

Lee becomes increasingly agitated; besides being preoccupied with the Short case, he is also worried about De Witt's imminent release from prison. When Bucky finds a pornographic film featuring Short, Lee absconds to Tijuana, ostensibly to track down the man who made the film. Bucky follows and encounters De Witt, who has skipped probation to travel to Tijuana. Shortly after De Witt is found murdered along with Mexican drug trafficker Felix Chasco, apparently by corrupt Rurales hired by Lee. Despite De Witt's death, Lee fails to reappear and Bucky returns to Los Angeles.

Bucky discovers a connection between Short and Fritz and his son and fellow officer Johnny Vogel. Initially suspecting the Vogels of being Short's killers, Bucky's investigation instead reveals that Fritz is intercepting referrals from LAPD to federal authorities and extorting suspects, and that Short was one of several prostitutes Johnny hired. Bucky arrests Johnny for soliciting, while Fritz commits suicide before his crimes can be revealed. Bucky is placed on two weeks' leave and uses the time off to return to Mexico to look for Lee. In Ensenada, he meets a San Diego private investigator Milton Dolphine who was hired to find Lee by a Mexican woman using an assumed name, probably Chasco's lover seeking to avenge his death. Dolphine tells Bucky that Lee was murdered by persons unknown, and with his help, Bucky finds Lee's body buried on the beach. He returns to L.A. and reveals all to Kay, who in turn reveals that Lee was the real leader of the bank robbers. He already knew Kay before the robbery, and framed De Witt to rescue Kay from his domestic abuse. Bucky is horrified by this revelation but forgives Lee and marries Kay. He ends his relationship with Madeleine and puts the Dahlia case behind him.

Bucky's superiors punish him for his part in Vogel's downfall by transferring him to the forensics unit, a career dead-end. His initially happy marriage with Kay gradually sours. Two years later, he is assigned to collect evidence surrounding the suicide of Eldridge Chambers, a former associate of Emmett. At Chambers' house, he sees a painting of a grotesque clown with a Glasgow smile, similar to Short's facial mutilations. His interest in the Dahlia case piqued again, Bucky stakes out the Sprague mansion and discovers that Madeleine is frequently making herself up to look like Short and picking up sailors in the same bars which Short once frequented. Bucky confronts Madeleine, who explains that she's been mimicking Short in order to lure Bucky to her, having developed a sexual fixation on him. The two renew their affair, causing Kay to leave Bucky.

During the pageant to celebrate the removal of the last four letters of the "Hollywoodland" sign, a nearby shack is discovered to contain a mattress covered in dried blood. Bucky conducts a forensic examination of the shack and determines that it is the place where Short was tortured and killed. He matches fingerprints at the shack to Tilden and learns that the shack is owned by Emmett.

Bucky confronts Madeleine and Emmett, who are revealed to be lovers, but they explain it is not incestuous as Madeleine is not actually Emmett's daughter but the result of an affair between Ramona and Tilden, for which Emmett got revenge by disfiguring Tilden with a knife. Years later, Madeleine provided one of Emmett's empty houses for the porno film featuring Short, and Tilden witnessed the shoot and became enamored with her. He subsequently blackmailed Emmett and Madeleine, threatening to reveal their relationship and Madeleine's true parentage, unless they arranged for him to go on a date with Short. Moreover, Emmett reveals that Tilden, the son of an anatomist, has always been obsessed with dead bodies and habitually exhumes corpses in order to collect their organs. Aware that he can't publicly expose Tilden and the Spragues lest he also be convicted for suppression of evidence, Bucky tracks down Tilden and kills him.

The murder is seemingly solved, but Bucky is bugged by a discrepancy in the case files and speaks to Martha Sprague, from whom he discovers that Lee had actually deduced Emmett and Madeleine's involvement in the first few days of the investigation and used this knowledge to blackmail Emmett for $100,000. Bucky is shocked by this revelation, and in particular by the fact that Kay acted as a go-between in the deal. He confronts Kay, who tells him that she never revealed what Lee told her about the case as a quiet revenge against Short for the ruination her case has brought to Bucky and Lee.

Bucky bumps into Chambers' widow and learns that the clown painting is of a character from the novel The Man Who Laughs. Remembering that a copy of that book was found at the shack where Short was killed, he discovers that Chambers bought the painting from Ramona. Ramona confesses to Bucky that she is the real murderer, having killed Short in Tilden's shack after gatecrashing their date; she persuaded Tilden to go along with it by offering to let him keep Short's organs after the murder. Having modeled her torture of Short upon the novel, she subsequently sold the painting to Chambers "as an act of purging." Martha implores Bucky to not arrest Ramona, who by this point is dying of lupus, the only member of the family Martha is close to.

While vacillating about whether or not to arrest Ramona, Bucky discovers that Madeleine is again dressing up as Short. Desperate to get his attention, she reveals to Bucky that she, in disguise as a Mexican woman, was the one who murdered Lee, in order to retrieve the $100,000 that he extorted from her father. Bucky arrests her, accepting that doing so will expose his evidence suppression. Madeleine fabricates a story for her guilty plea about a love triangle between her, Bucky, and Lee to give herself a motive for Lee's murder while concealing any connection between the Sprague family and Short's murder. Bucky goes along with the story, and is fired from the LAPD while Madeleine is convicted and institutionalized; the Dahlia case remains officially unsolved. Bucky tries to track down Kay and finds she has left Los Angeles for good, but months later Kay writes to him telling him that she is pregnant. The novel ends with Bucky flying out to Kay to reconcile with her, and on the plane, he prays for Short's spirit to watch over him in his new home – Boston, her birthplace.

== Reception ==
The Black Dahlia was one of numerous neo-noir novels published in the late 1970s and 1980s. Ellroy was known as an author of crime fiction but this novel is considered to have gained him critical notice as a serious writer of literature.

Ellroy wrote three other novels in what he termed the L.A. Quartet, a cycle of novels set in 1940s and 1950s Los Angeles. He portrays the city in this period as a hotbed of political corruption and depravity. The Quartet continues with The Big Nowhere, L.A. Confidential, and White Jazz.

== Adaptations ==
=== Film ===
The Black Dahlia was adapted for a 2006 film of the same name by director Brian De Palma and screenwriter Josh Friedman. Starring Scarlett Johansson, Josh Hartnett and Aaron Eckhart, it was a critical and commercial failure, but did receive some positive reviews.

=== Graphic novel ===
In 2013, Matz and David Fincher adapted James Ellroy's novel into a comic called Le Dahlia noir, with Miles Hyman as the illustrator. Originally published in French, it was published in English in 2016 as The Black Dahlia: A Crime Graphic Novel.

== Anachronisms ==
The Black Dahlia has several references to characters having been committed to Atascadero State Hospital, but this institution did not open until 1954. The character Madeleine is committed there (ch. 3–5), but the hospital's patient population was historically limited to men.

Madeleine tells her father she and Bucky met at an art show at Stanley Rose's bookstore. However, that store closed permanently eight years prior in 1939.

== See also ==
- Black Dahlia – Details of the murder of Elizabeth Short.
- L.A. Quartet
