= Lincoln Heights Jail =

Former jail in Los Angeles, California, US

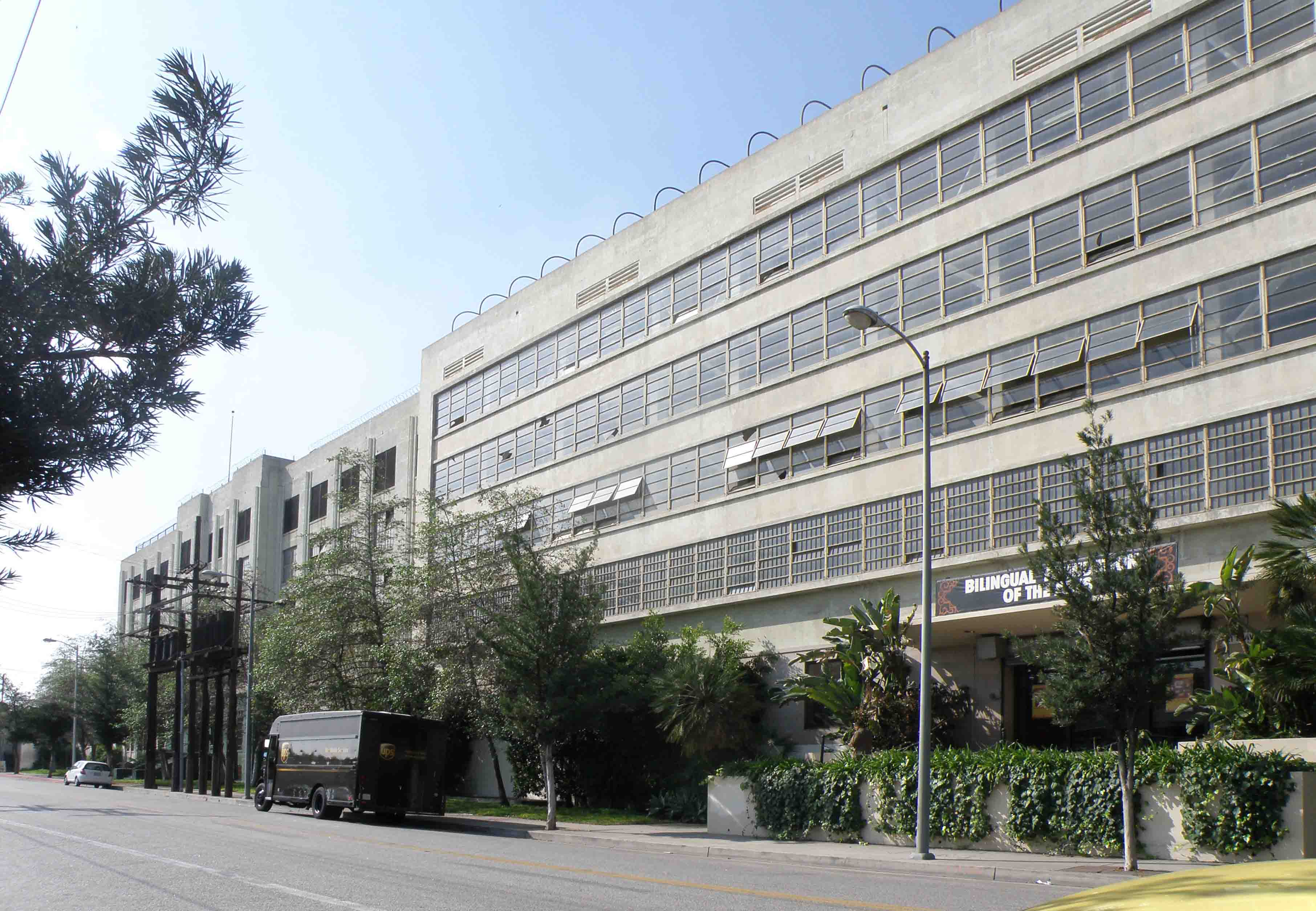
- Lincoln Heights Jail, Los Angeles, 2009
- Interactive map of Lincoln Heights Jail
- Location: 421 North Avenue 19 Los Angeles, California, United States; 34.077472°N 118.224875°W
- Opened: 1931
- Closed: 1965

Lincoln Heights Jail is a former jail building complex in the Lincoln Heights neighborhood of Los Angeles, California, located adjacent to the Los Angeles River and situated about 0.7 miles (1.1 km) southwest of the Lincoln/Cypress station. The original building built in the late 1920s is noted for its Art Deco style. The jail was designated a Los Angeles Historic-Cultural Monument on November 30, 1993.

== History ==
Lincoln Heights Jail was originally built in 1927 at a cost of $5 million and opened in 1931. A police station was built next to the jail. The initial five-story building was constructed to accommodate 625 prisoners. The jail was expanded in the early 1950s to accommodate 2,800 prisoners. Notable detainees included Al Capone and individuals arrested during the Zoot Suit Riots and the Watts riots. In 1951, the unprovoked beating of seven prisoners by LAPD officers occurred in the prison on what came to be known as "Bloody Christmas". The jail was decommissioned in 1965, after the Los Angeles City Council and the Los Angeles County Board of Supervisors agreed to consolidate inmates in a nearby county jail as a cost-efficiency measure.

From 1979 until 2014, the building was the home of the Bilingual Foundation of the Arts.

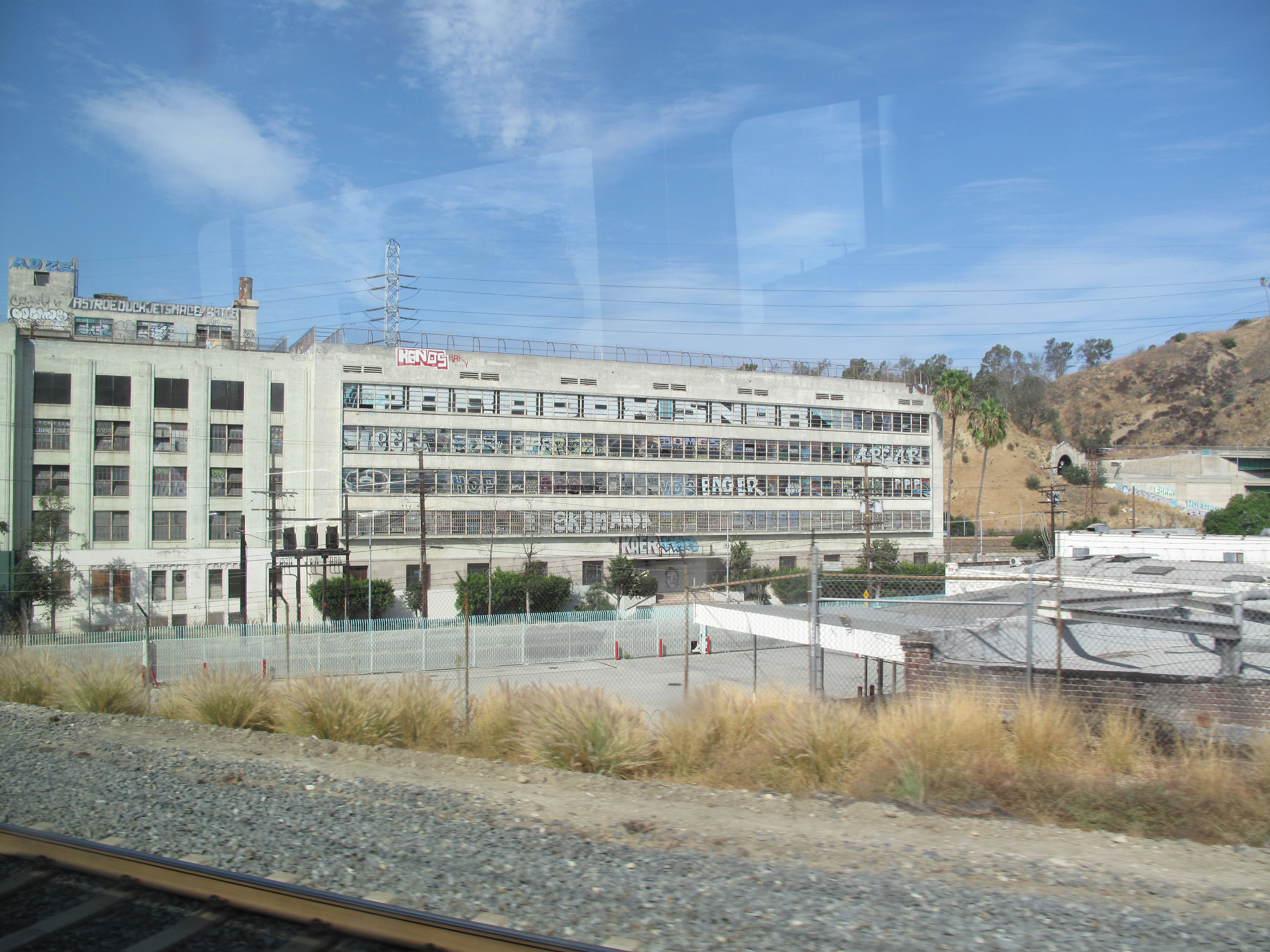

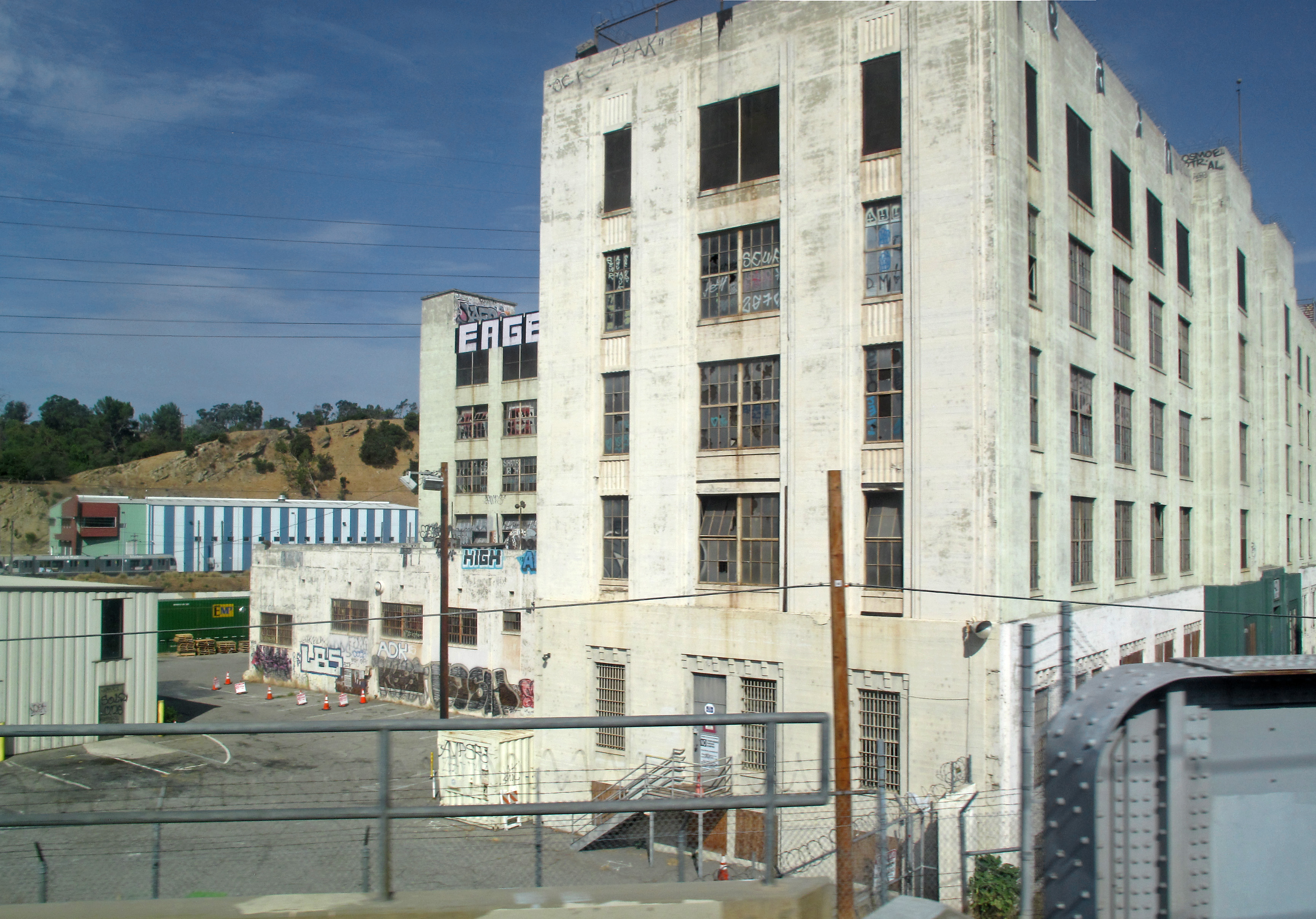

=== Redevelopment ===
In 2016, the City of Los Angeles issued a Request for Interest to garner development ideas to revitalize the sprawling 229,000 square feet (21,300 m^{2}) jail complex. In 2017, Lincoln Property Company and Fifteen Group were selected to redevelop the Lincoln Heights Jail complex into the Lincoln Heights Makers District, which will feature a commercial and manufacturing spaces, a public market, creative office space, live-work housing, an amphitheater with green space, recreation areas and a communal rooftop deck. As of March 2020, the project has been delayed due to environmental issues with the site.

== In popular culture ==
The novel L.A. Confidential and subsequent film, part of which was filmed there, was inspired by the Bloody Christmas incident. The 1984 horror movie Nightmare on Elm Street filmed the boiler room scenes here and the 1983 exploitation women in prison film Chained Heat was also filmed at the prison. Some prison scenes in American History X were shot on the roof. The television series Cagney & Lacey used it as a filming location. The scene in Iron Man 2 where main antagonist Ivan Vanko breaks out of prison was also filmed at this location. It is featured in the "Jailbreak" episode of the Jack Palance series Bronk. Some jail scenes in the beginning of the 1997 movie Con Air were filmed at Lincoln Heights.

The building was used to film parts for the music videos "Feeling This" by Blink-182, "Telephone" by Lady Gaga, and "Good Girls" by 5 Seconds of Summer.
