= The Black Dahlia (graphic novel) =

Graphic novel adaptation

- Date: June 7, 2016
- Main characters: Dwight "Bucky" Bleichert, Lee Blanchard, Kay Lake
- Page count: 176 pages
- Publisher: Archaia Entertainment

Creative team
- Writer: Matz with David Fincher
- Artist: Miles Hyman
- Letterer: Deron Bennett
- Editor: Sierra Hahn

Original publication
- Published in: Casterman
- Issues: Payot & Rivages
- Date of publication: November 13, 2013
- Language: French
- ISBN: 220304568X

The Black Dahlia: A Crime Graphic Novel is a graphic novel adaptation of James Ellroy's novel The Black Dahlia, by Alexis Nolent and David Fincher, and illustrated by Miles Hyman. Originally published in 2013 in French as Le Dahlia Noir, it was published in English in June 2016, by Archaia Entertainment, a division of Boom! Studios.

== Synopsis ==
Dwight "Bucky" Bleichert celebrates his first day at the Warrants division of the Los Angeles Police Department, a prestigious position where most police in Los Angeles dream to work. He is teamed up with Leland "Lee" Blanchard, as he was a former boxer. He also meets Kay Lake, a woman who lives with Lee, but doesn't have an intimate relationship with him. The three form a "fairy tale triangle."

In January 1947, they begin to investigate a murder as horrible as publicized: that of Elizabeth "Betty" Short, nicknamed "The Black Dahlia" found dead and mutilated in a vacant lot.

Bucky and Lee's personal and professional lives begin to unravel as the investigation continues. They both become obsessed with Elizabeth Short. Bucky discovers that Lee's celebrated case—"The Boulevard-Citizens Bank Robbery"—was actually orchestrated by Lee. It was an attempt to frame Bobby DeWitt, Kay Lake's pimp at the time, and to save Kay from the violent DeWitt, who scarred Kay's body with a knife.

In the course of the investigation, leads in the murder case point to Mexico. Lee heads there alone, and eventually Bucky follows him to Mexico as well, because of the length of Lee's absence. Bucky finds Lee murdered, in a site used to dump bodies.

Returning to Los Angeles, Kay reveals many truths about Lee Blanchard's life, as well as hers. Despite this, Bucky and Kay marry May 2, 1947.

Bucky begins to deteriorate over the years, but successfully solves Elizabeth Short's murder. Kay has left him at this point because Bucky has become obsessed with Elizabeth Short. Bucky is fired from the LAPD because of his own conduct. Bucky receives a letter from Kay, informing him she is pregnant, postmarked from Cambridge, Massachusetts. Bucky leaves for a flight to Boston, Massachusetts, to reunite with Kay.

== Style and artwork ==
Miles Hyman used charcoal drawings in The Black Dahlia. Each page contains three comic strips, an idea proposed by Fincher.

== History ==
In an interview with the Los Angeles Times, Matz, one of the two co-authors of the book, described the process of adapting the original novel into the comic book medium. He stated he did not originally start the script in French, but in English. He also said James Ellroy had to approve the script, stating "If he didn't approve it, the graphic novel was killed. Simple as that." He mentioned how he had known David Fincher from when Fincher was going to adapt Matz's series, The Killer, into a film. Fincher was also previously attached as director to the film adaptation, but had left the project to direct Zodiac. Matz said Fincher's input was "very valuable" and "Having him onboard made a big difference."

== Reception ==
The Black Dahlia: A Crime Graphic Novel received mostly favorable reviews. An article from Nerdgeist said "This book is further reason why graphic novels are not just for kids, it's mature, dark and a real gripping read, that does its source material more justice than the film ever did and helps keep alive the memory of someone that died all too young in an all too horrific manner." ComiXology gave it 4 out of 5 stars. An article by 20 minutes stated, "As captivating, neat and dense as the novel is, this graphic version enjoys an incredible combination of know-how. It would be surprising that it does not box in bookstores." Le Figaro wrote "The authors have fully understood, and the case Betty Short has not finished to upset the souls, thanks to the masterful reinterpretation of Fincher, Matz and Hyman." A review from Forces of Geek praised the graphic novel adaptation, saying "The three together condense the novel into a visual form that exceptionally captures the tone and style of the best noirs without ever feeling derivative or referential. They are handling one of the biggest stories in noir folklore and one of the biggest noir novels of the last 30 years, which is a heavy task, but they achieve in so many places where the film failed." Larry Harnisch, a former writer for the Los Angeles Times, critiqued the graphic novel for "compressing and compacting" the source material of Ellroy's 1987 novel, as well as "exposing many weaknesses that aren't apparent in the original book", real life historical inaccuracies, artwork appearing stiff and clunky, and difficulty in telling characters apart.

== See also ==
- Black Dahlia
- For the James Ellroy novel, see The Black Dahlia (novel)
- For the film adaptation of the novel, see The Black Dahlia (film)
