= Will Greer =

American politician (born 2003)

Member of the Vermont House of Representatives from the Bennington 2 district
- Incumbent
- Assumed office January 8, 2025 Serving with Timothy Corcoran II
- Preceded by: Dane Whitman

Personal details
- Born: 15 January 2003 (age 23) Nacogdoches, Texas
- Party: Democratic
- Education: Bennington College
- Website: www.williamgreervt.com

William "Will" Greer (born January 15, 2003) is an American politician from Vermont. He has been a Democratic member of the Vermont House of Representatives for the Bennington 2 District since 2025. He is the youngest member of the Vermont General Assembly.

Greer was born in Nacogdoches, Texas, and grew up primarily in McAllen, near the United States–Mexico border. He moved to Vermont to attend Bennington College, graduating in 2024 with a Bachelor of Arts concentrating in public administration and local governance.

== Education ==
Greer graduated from Bennington College with a Bachelor of Arts in Public Administration.

== Career ==
Greer served as Secretary of the Vermont Democratic Party. Greer currently serves as the High Bailiff of Bennington County and as a Justice of the Peace for the Town of Bennington.

== Personal life ==
Greer is openly gay. In a 2024 interview with The Advocate, he discussed his experiences as an LGBTQ political candidate, noting that his age had attracted more scrutiny than his sexual orientation. He expressed appreciation for the acceptance he experienced in Vermont politics.

Greer is a practicing Episcopalian and a member of St. Peter's Church in Bennington. He lives in North Bennington.

== Electoral History ==
2022 Bennington County High Bailiff
Party	Candidate	Votes	%
Democratic	Frederick Gilbar	1,804	51.1%
Democratic	William "Will" Greer	1,727	48.9%
Majority		—	—
Frederick Gilbar hold

2024 Bennington-2 Democratic Primary
Party	Candidate	Votes	%
Democratic	Timothy R. Corcoran II	360	31.4%
Democratic	Asher Edelson	186	16.2%
Democratic	William "Will" Greer	299	26.1%
Democratic	Leon Johnson	295	25.7%
Majority		—	—
Timothy R. Corcoran II and William "Will" Greer hold

2024 Bennington-2 State House District
Party	Candidate	Votes
Democratic	Timothy R. Corcoran II	2,136
Republican	Anthony Cook	1,363
Democratic	William "Will" Greer	1,858
Majority		—
Timothy R. Corcoran II and William "Will" Greer hold

2026 Bennington-2 Democratic Primary
Party	Candidate	Votes	%
Democratic	Timothy R. Corcoran II	488	31.7%
Democratic	William "Will" Greer	629	40.9%
Democratic	Leon Johnson	421	27.4%
Majority		—	—
Timothy R. Corcoran II and William "Will" Greer hold
