= J. Russell Carpenter =

American politician

Member of the Vermont House of Representatives from the Bennington 2-3 district
- In office January 1989 – January 1993
- Preceded by: John Page
- Succeeded by: Mary Madkour

Personal details
- Born: James Russell Carpenter Jr. December 17, 1927 Schenectady, New York, U.S.
- Died: June 10, 2006 (aged 78) Bennington, Vermont, U.S.
- Party: Democratic
- Spouse: Mary Elaine Connifey (m. 1952–2006)
- Education: University of Vermont; Siena College

Military service
- Allegiance: United States
- Branch/service: United States Navy
- Years of service: 1945–1947
- Battles/wars: World War II

James Russell Carpenter Jr. (December 17, 1927 – June 10, 2006) was an American politician who served for two terms in the Vermont House of Representatives. A member of the Democratic Party, he was defeated for reelection by Republican Mary Madkour in 1992.

== Electoral history ==
Date	Election	Candidate	Party	Votes	%
Vermont House of Representatives, Bennington 2-3 district
Nov 8, 1988	General	Timothy R. Corcoran	Democratic	2,071	54.97
Nov 8, 1988	General	J. Russell Carpenter	Democratic	1,766	46.03
Nov 8, 1988	General	Write-Ins		0	0.00
Nov 8, 1988	General	John Page ran for state senate; seat switched from Republican to Democratic			
Nov 6, 1990	General	Timothy R. Corcoran	Democratic	1,616	52.21
Nov 6, 1990	General	J. Russell Carpenter	Democratic	1,479	47.79
Nov 6, 1990	General	Write-Ins		0	0.00
Nov 3, 1992	General	Timothy R. Corcoran	Democratic	2,384	43.35
Nov 3, 1992	General	Mary McGarey Madkour	Republican	1,656	30.11
Nov 3, 1992	General	J. Russell Carpenter	Democratic	1,459	26.53
Nov 3, 1992	General	Write-Ins		0	0.00

Vermont House of Representatives
Preceded by John Page	Vermont Representative from the Bennington 2-3 District; 1989–1993; Served alongside: Timothy R. Corcoran	Succeeded by Mary Madkour
