= White Jazz =

Novel by James Ellroy

- First edition cover
- Author: James Ellroy
- Cover artist: Jacket design by Chip Kidd; Front–of–jacket photograph by Robert Morrow
- Language: English
- Series: L.A. Quartet
- Genre: Crime fiction, noir, historical fiction
- Publisher: Alfred A. Knopf
- Publication date: September 1, 1992
- Publication place: United States
- Media type: Print (hardcover & paperback), audio cassette, and audio download
- Pages: 349 pp (first edition, hardcover)
- ISBN: 0-679-41449-5 (first edition, hardcover)
- Preceded by: L.A. Confidential

White Jazz is a 1992 crime fiction novel by James Ellroy. It is the fourth in his L.A. Quartet, preceded by The Black Dahlia, The Big Nowhere, and L.A. Confidential.

Lieutenant David Klein is a veteran policeman who moonlights as a hitman for organized crime. When he is assigned to investigate a robbery at the home of the Los Angeles Police Department's (L.A.P.D.) sanctioned heroin dealer, he uncovers a plot to bring the city's crime syndicates into collusion with the channels of justice.

The stories of many characters that appeared in earlier L.A. Quartet novels, including Edmund Exley and Dudley Smith, have their ends tied up in White Jazz, which also introduces Pete Bondurant, one of the central characters in Ellroy's Underworld USA Trilogy.

== Prologue ==
James Ellroy dedicated the novel to Helen Knode. The epigraph is a quote by Ross Macdonald: "In the end I possess my birthplace and I am possessed by its language."

The novel's prologue is told by protagonist David Douglas Klein, years after the events have taken place:

All I have is the will to remember. Time revoked/fever dreams-I wake up reaching, afraid I'll forget. Pictures keep the woman young. L.A., fall 1958. Newsprint: link the dots. Names, events-so brutal they beg to be connected. Years down-the story stays dispersed. The names are dead or too guilty to tell. I'm old, afraid I'll forget: I killed innocent men. I betrayed sacred oaths. I reaped profit from horror. Fever-that time burning. I want to go with the music-spin, fall with it.

== Plot ==
Dave Klein is a lieutenant in the L.A.P.D.'s vice unit. He has a sister named Meg, with whom he shares an incestuous attraction, and performs contract killings for the mob to cover the costs for law school. Klein has committed several murders, including the unsolved killings of Tony Brancato and Tony Trombino, who were killed in revenge for hurting Meg. He seeks to get out of mob work and begs the dying Jack Dragna to let him go. When he refuses, Klein suffocates him.

After setting up a raid on a bookmaking operation, Klein and his partner, George "Junior" Stemmons, are ordered to protect a witness in a probe into organized crime in boxing. Having been told by gangster Mickey Cohen that another crime figure, Sam Giancana, wants the witness dead, Klein throws the witness out of a high window and makes it look like an accident. Later that night, Captain Wilhite, of the corrupt Narcotics Squad, summons Klein to investigate a burglary at the home of J. C. Kafesjian, a drug dealer sanctioned by the L.A.P.D.

Klein gets a side job from Howard Hughes to obtain information on an actress named Glenda Bledsoe that would violate the morality clause of her full-service contract. Klein learns through Cohen that Glenda has a "publicity date" with actor Rock Rockwell which violates the clause. During surveillance of Glenda, Klein finds out she, Rockwell, Touch Vecchio, and George Ainge are planning a fake kidnapping. Klein falls for Glenda and decides not to aid Hughes in getting her blacklisted by the film industry. He begins to aid Glenda as he continues investigating the Kafesjian burglary.

Klein discovers that Edmund Exley is still trying to prosecute Dudley Smith and begins working with him. When he meets an undercover officer, Johnny Duhamel, Klein is shot up with drugs and kills Duhamel in an act caught on film. Klein is arrested by federal agents and becomes a witness, but is given forty-eight hours before he is taken into custody. Klein and Exley discover that Smith is selling heroin exclusively to the black population in the Southside to keep crime in that area "contained". The two track down the Kafesjians' burglar, Wylie Bullock.

Finding himself grappling with all of his crimes and everything that is happening, Klein decides to meet Smith, who had earlier offered him a deal. Klein brings Bullock but is forced to shoot him when he attacks and maims Smith. Klein tries to flee but is soon caught. While in federal custody, Klein writes a full confession and has copies sent to various press outlets. Only the tabloid magazine Hush-Hush is willing to print it, but is prevented from doing so by an injunction. Klein manages to escape from custody and hide out with Pete Bondurant; Hughes has Bondurant beat him up, causing Klein to be hospitalized.

Exley sends Klein a package in the hospital, which includes a blank passport and a silencer-fitted .38 revolver. In a note, Exley says he will allow Klein to kill Smith if he feels justice has not been absolute. Instead, Klein murders J. C. and Tommy Kafesjian. He spends one last night with Glenda, takes pictures to remember her by and flies to Rio de Janeiro. In the epilogue, set many years later, Klein plans to return to Los Angeles intending to destroy Exley's gubernatorial campaign, take revenge on Carlisle and Smith and find Glenda.

== Reception ==
The reviews for White Jazz were quite positive. "Blacker than noir... Makes most other crime novels seem naive."--Publishers Weekly. "James Ellroy's latest book WHITE JAZZ makes previous detective fiction read like Dr. Seuss."--San Francisco Examiner. "Ellroy's tenth novel burns with the memory of Rodney King in its descriptions of unimaginably cruel law officers who are not merely tainted by corruption on a vast scale but pursue conventional police work as a sideline to more lucrative illegal activities that burst into the public consciousness in violent frenzies.... An undeniably artful frenzy of violence, guilt and unappeased self-loathing. Ellroy's crime fiction represents a high mark in the genre."--New York Newsday.

In the wake of the 1992 Los Angeles riots, Wendy Lesser, reviewing the novel for The New York Times wrote:

What the real Los Angeles possesses, amid all its fiery disintegration, is what Mr. Ellroy's latest novel keenly lacks: a coherent narrative line. We may not have been pleased about what was happening this spring, but we knew why it was happening. In White Jazz, I was lost by page 56—the page on which the author explicitly reveals whatever plot the novel is going to have. ("Instinct—call me bait—a bad cop sent out to draw heat," Klein correctly guesses.) For the next 300 pages it was just a matter of waiting out the body count and wishing for a more interesting variety of subject-verb combinations. Mr. Ellroy, in order to pack maximo action into minimo pages, has developed what he clearly views as a whiplash telegraphic style. No doubt the violence done to the English language is meant to mirror the violence done to humanity by its fellow humanity (I'm being charitable here). But we can't really begin to care about characters who never even get to inhabit a complete sentence.

== Efforts at a film adaptation ==
Various attempts at a film adaption of White Jazz have been under development since the 1990s. But as of 2009, Ellroy said that an adaptation of "White Jazz is dead. All movie adaptations of my books are dead."

=== History ===
Ellroy completed a draft of a 131-page screenplay on October 31, 1997. In 1998, cinematographer Robert Richardson signed on for what would have been his directorial debut with Fine Line Features distributing. They put the project into turnaround in early 1999 due to budgetary concerns. In early December 2001, it was reported that "German-based VIF Intl. Films had come aboard to finance White Jazz, co-producing with Nick Nolte's Kingsgate Films and L.A.-based production company Interlight. Nolte and John Cusack were set to star in the film, with Winona Ryder reportedly in discussions to join them. Nolte was to play Klein, Cusack to play Junior Stemmons and Ryder to play Hollywood starlet Glenda. Uma Thurman was also attached to the project at one point and was to play Glenda. The screenplay was written by Ellroy and Christopher Cleveland. After the demise of the project, Richardson said "That's why directors go absolutely crazy – the development of a project is highly unpredictable and doesn't make tremendous sense. It may happen, but not in my time frame."

On November 30, 2006, it was reported that George Clooney was set to star in a newly green-lit film adaptation of the novel for Warner Independent Pictures. Clooney was also on board as producer along with his Smoke House partner Grant Heslov. The film was to be written by Matthew Michael Carnahan and directed by his brother Joe Carnahan. Both Jason Bateman and Peter Berg had signed on to appear in the film. The script changes the Armenian Kafesjian family in the novel to the Mexican Magdalena family. Joe Carnahan said this of his brother's script, "It's, to me, what that book always was – the point of departure from the Eisenhower '50s to the psychedelic freakshow, Manson '60s. It's a total combination of the two with a heavy, heavy voice-over narration, this kind of classic noir." Carnahan had also confirmed that the characters of Ed Exley and Dudley Smith would not be in the film version despite their presence in the book, as Regency Productions has its own plans for a sequel to L.A. Confidential and asked the director to remove Exley from his screenplay as they own the rights to the character. Instead, the Carnahans had constructed a "doppelganger" for Exley, "giving him all of [his] traits and speech patterns."

Carnahan described his vision of White Jazz as reflecting the "kind of mid-century explosion of art and music, and really letting that be the kind of guiding force behind it, as opposed to making it like this ... all 'period suits'. I really want to try to make it as accurate a reflection of L.A. at that moment in time as I can." He also commented on George Clooney's willingness to play an unlikable character for the first time. "He's made that very clear to me: 'I have no other desire than to play what's in that script.' And what's in that script is a pretty despicable guy at times, and pretty nefarious and nasty and selfish." Carnahan also touched upon how he trimmed down the novel's numerous subplots because "I always thought that as much as I love White Jazz, it became almost unfilmable at some point, because there are so many strands, so much, and it became so psychotic ... that's what made it such a great book, but those things would not carry over into the filmic realm, I thought, with ease."

Clooney later dropped out of starring in the film due to scheduling conflicts with other projects. Chris Pine, who was also up for a role in the film, decided to take on the role of James T. Kirk in J. J. Abrams' 2009 Star Trek film. Having finished the last draft of the screenplay, Carnahan initially stated that he would still make the film and had "a couple of options in terms of other actors that I am completely over the moon for."
