= The Black Dahlia (film) =

2006 film directed by Brian De Palma

- Theatrical release poster
- Directed by: Brian De Palma
- Screenplay by: Josh Friedman
- Based on: The Black Dahlia (1987 novel) by James Ellroy
- Produced by: Rudy Cohen; Moshe Diamant; Avi Lerner; Art Linson
- Starring: Josh Hartnett; Scarlett Johansson; Aaron Eckhart; Hilary Swank
- Cinematography: Vilmos Zsigmond
- Edited by: Bill Pankow
- Music by: Mark Isham
- Production companies: Millennium Films; Nu Image; Davis Films; Signature Pictures
- Distributed by: Universal Pictures (U.S.); Metropolitan Filmexport (France); Warner Bros. Pictures (Germany)
- Release dates: August 30, 2006 (Venice); September 15, 2006 (U.S.); October 5, 2006 (Germany); November 8, 2006 (France)
- Running time: 120 minutes
- Countries: United States; France; Germany
- Language: English
- Budget: $50 million
- Box office: $49.3 million

The Black Dahlia is a 2006 neo-noir mystery film directed by Brian De Palma, adapted by Josh Friedman from James Ellroy's 1987 novel, the first in his L.A. Quartet series. It stars Josh Hartnett, Scarlett Johansson, Aaron Eckhart, Hilary Swank and Mia Kirshner. Inspired by the widely sensationalized murder of Elizabeth Short, its plot follows Bucky Bleichert and Lee Blanchard, two LAPD detectives investigating the case, leading them through a series of shocking discoveries.

The rights to the novel were optioned by De Palma in 1997, with David Fincher originally attached to direct. De Palma was ultimately hired after Fincher dropped out to direct Zodiac instead. Principal photography began in Sofia, Bulgaria in April 2005, with exterior location photography in Los Angeles. The film was an international co-production between American, French, and German companies.

The Black Dahlia premiered at the 63rd Venice International Film Festival on August 30, 2006, where it was nominated for the Golden Lion, and was theatrically released in the United States on September 15. The film received was a commercial disappointment and received generally negative reviews, though the visuals and Mia Kirshner's performance as Short was praised. The film's failure, along with De Palma's dissatisfaction with the final cut, led the director being effectively ousted from the Hollywood major studio system. At the 79th Academy Awards, The Black Dahlia was nominated for Best Cinematography (Vilmos Zsigmond).

== Plot ==
In 1947, LAPD detectives Dwight "Bucky" Bleichert and Lee Blanchard are made partners after engaging in a boxing match to raise public support for the department. Lee introduces Bucky to his girlfriend Kay Lake, and the trio becomes inseparable. Bucky is shocked when Kay tells him she is not sleeping with Lee. When she later tries to seduce him, he refuses. Bucky also discovers that Kay has been branded with the initials "BD", for Bobby DeWitt, the gangster whose arrest and conviction for a big bank robbery made Lee's career.

Soon after, on January 15, Elizabeth Short's dismembered body is found and she is dubbed "The Black Dahlia" by the press. Bucky learns that Elizabeth was an aspiring actress who appeared in a pornographic film and hung out with lesbians. He goes to a lesbian nightclub and meets Madeleine Linscott, who bears a slight resemblance to Elizabeth.

Madeline comes from a prominent family, and tells Bucky that she was very close to Elizabeth. She asks him to keep her name out of the papers in exchange for sexual favors. Madeline later introduces Bucky to her wealthy parents Emmett and Ramona.

Lee's own obsession with the case leads him to become erratic and abusive toward Kay. After Lee and Bucky have a heated exchange about a previous case, Bucky goes to Lee and Kay's to apologize. Then he learns from Kay that Lee is responding to a tip about Bobby DeWitt.

Bucky finds DeWitt in the atrium of a building before he is gunned down by Lee, then sees a man garrote Lee before a second figure steps out and slits Lee's throat. Lee and the man holding the rope fall over the railing to their deaths several floors below. The grief of losing Lee propels Bucky and Kay into having sex.

The next morning, Bucky finds money hidden in Lee and Kay's bathroom. Kay reveals that she had been the girlfriend of DeWitt, who had abused her. Lee rescued Kay, stole DeWitt's money, and put DeWitt behind bars. Bucky realizes Lee was there to kill DeWitt and leaves, furious, to return to Madeleine, where he notices a painting of a leering clown. Kay follows him and she is appalled to see Madeleine's striking resemblance to the Dahlia.

Bucky starts putting the pieces together. He remembers props in another movie, The Man Who Laughs, matched the set in Elizabeth's pornographic film. The end credits thanked Emmett, so Bucky digs deeper, into a story Madeleine told about him using old film sets to build cheap firetrap housing.

In an empty house below the Hollywoodland sign built by Emmett, Bucky recognizes the set that was used in Elizabeth's film. He finds evidence in a barn on the property that Elizabeth was killed and butchered there, as well as a drawing of a man with a Glasgow smile. The drawing matches the painting in Madeleine's home and the gruesome smile carved into Elizabeth's face.

Bucky confronts Madeleine and Emmett in their home and Ramona reveals that she killed Elizabeth. She confesses that Madeleine was not fathered by Emmett but rather by his best friend Georgie Tilden. She says Georgie became infatuated while watching Elizabeth film the pornography. Ramona was disturbed by the idea of Georgie having sex with someone who looked so much like his own daughter, and lured Elizabeth to the house and killed her. Before Bucky can decide what to do, Ramona shoots herself.

A few days later, remembering something Lee said during the investigation, Bucky visits Madeleine's sister Martha with some questions. He learns that Lee knew about Madeleine and Elizabeth, and blackmailed Emmett to keep it secret. Bucky finds Madeleine at a seedy motel, and she admits to being the one who slit Lee's throat. Although she insists that Bucky wants to have sex with her rather than kill her, he tells her she is wrong and shoots her dead. Bucky goes to Kay's house, she invites him in and closes the door.

== Cast ==
- Josh Hartnett as Det. Dwight "Bucky" Bleichert / "Mr. Ice"
- Scarlett Johansson as Katherine "Kay" Lake
- Aaron Eckhart as Det. Lee Blanchard / "Mr. Fire"
- Hilary Swank as Madeleine Linscott
- Mia Kirshner as Elizabeth Short
- Mike Starr as Det. Russ Millard
- Fiona Shaw as Ramona Linscott
- Patrick Fischler as Deputy District Attorney Ellis Loew
- James Otis as Dolph Bleichert
- John Kavanagh as Emmett Linscott
- Troy Evans as Chief Thad Green
- Anthony Russell as Morrie Friedman
- Pepe Serna as Tomas Dos Santos
- Angus MacInnes as Cpt. John Tierney
- Rachel Miner as Martha Linscott
- Victor McGuire as Sgt. Bill Koenig
- Gregg Henry as Pete Lukins
- Jemima Rooper as Lorna Mertz
- Rose McGowan as Sheryl Saddon
- Steve Eastin as Detective
- Ian McNeice as Coroner
- Mia Frye as Bartender
- Richard Brake as Bobby DeWitt
- William Finley as Georgie Tilden
- Fatso-Fasano as Dealer

Uncredited

- Kevin Dunn as Cleo A. Short
- k.d. lang as Singer
- Brian De Palma as Director

== Production ==
=== Development ===
James B. Harris optioned the film rights to the novel by James Ellroy shortly after it was published in 1987. He planned to direct the adaptation and completed a script before abandoning the project to make Cop. The project then languished in development hell for several years. In 1997, L.A. Confidential, the third book in Ellroy's L.A. Quartet, was adapted into a critically acclaimed and highly successful film of the same name. Its success resulted in several studios becoming interested in adapting Ellroy's other novels. Universal acquired the rights to The Black Dahlia shortly after the release of L.A. Confidential. Josh Friedman was hired to write the screenplay. Friedman has claimed that he worked on the script from 1997 to 2005. His original script featured cameo appearances by Russell Crowe and Guy Pearce, reprising their roles as Bud White and Edmund Exley respectively. As early as 1998, David Fincher was attached to direct the project. Ellroy approved Fincher as director for the film having enjoyed his work on Seven. Fincher envisioned the story as a five-hour miniseries with an $80 million budget and major film actors.

=== Casting ===
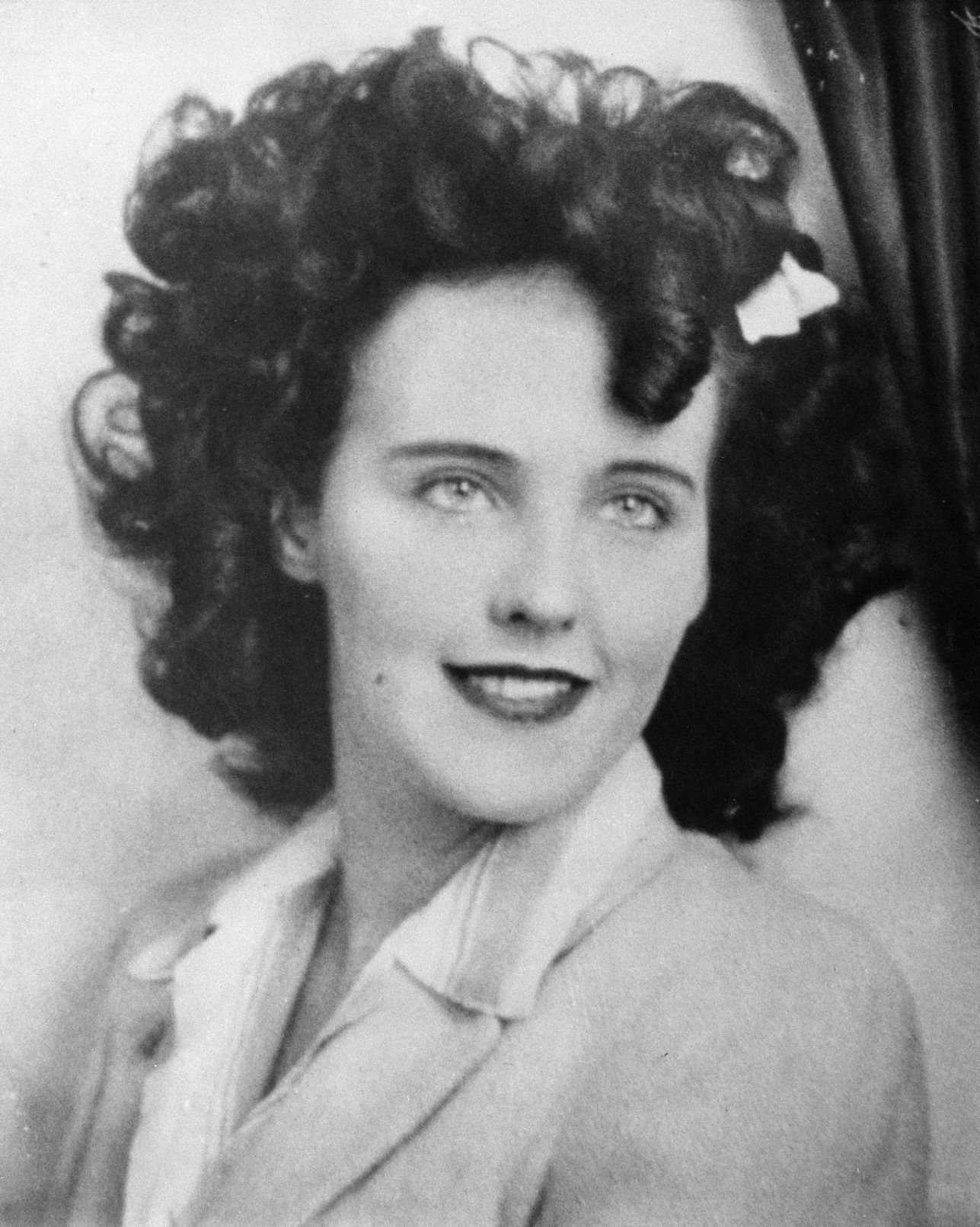
The real Elizabeth Short in 1946.

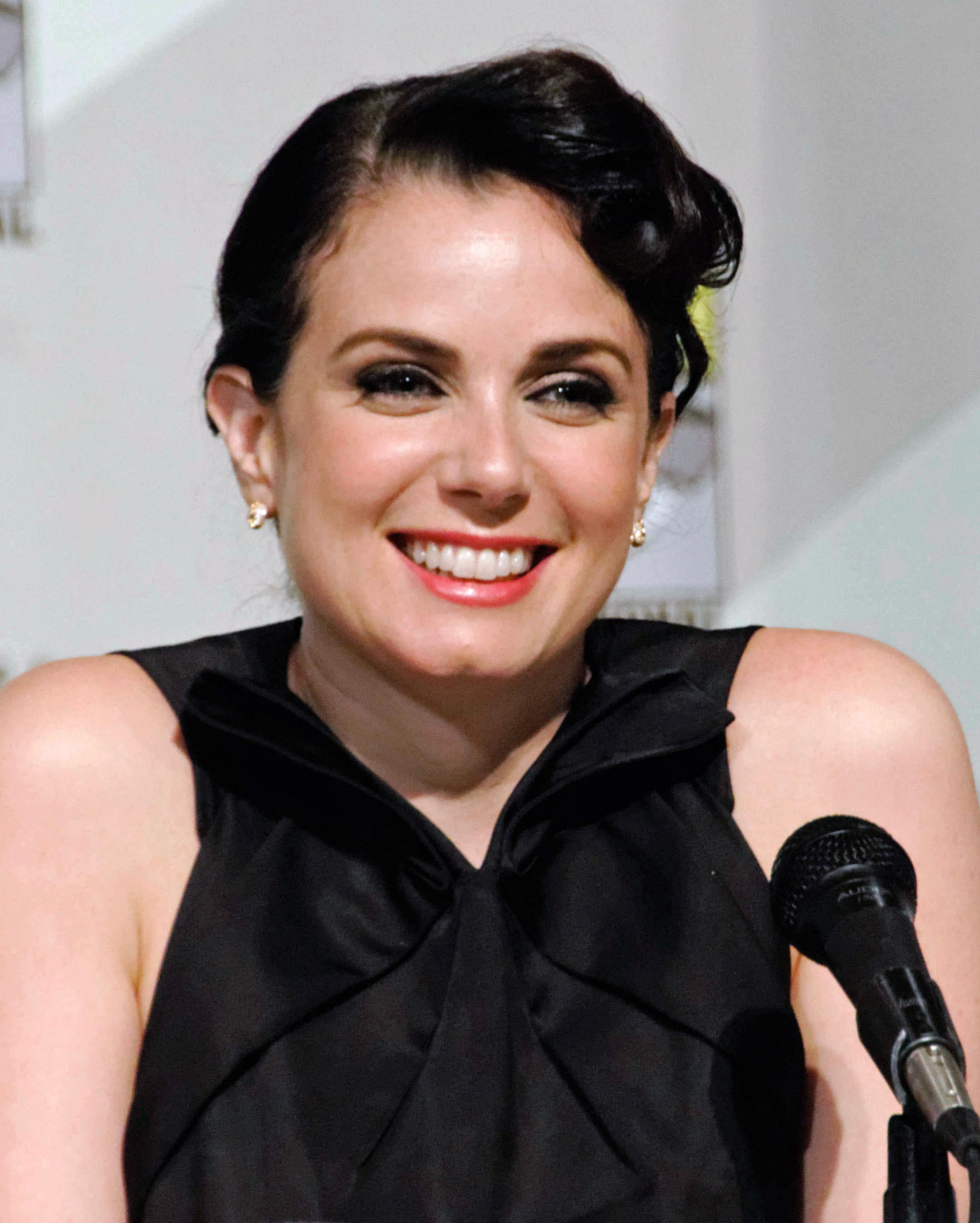
Mia Kirshner in 2012.

Michael Douglas, Johnny Depp, Gabriel Byrne and Billy Crudup were considered to play Lee Blanchard. Paul Walker, Stephen Dorff and Chris O'Donnell were considered for Bucky Bleichert. Fairuza Balk and Tiffani Thiessen were considered for Elizabeth Short. Sherilyn Fenn, who had been the front runner for the part in the late eighties, was also a contender.

The film was originally in pre-production with Fincher attached as director, Josh Hartnett attached to play Bucky and Mark Wahlberg attached to play Lee. Wahlberg was forced to drop out due to scheduling conflicts with the planned filming of The Italian Job. Fincher apparently wanted Julianna Margulies for Madeleine Linscott and Jennifer Connelly for Elizabeth. Fincher eventually left the project as he felt he wasn't going to be able to make the film exactly as he had envisioned and moved on to direct Zodiac. Fincher would eventually return to the source material and work on a graphic novel adaptation of the book in 2016.

When Brian De Palma became director, he replaced Wahlberg with Aaron Eckhart shortly before shooting began in April 2005. Hartnett had remained attached to the project all this time. Gwen Stefani was considered for the part of Kay Lake. Eva Green was offered the role of Madeleine but declined as she feared being typecast as a femme fatale. Kate Beckinsale, Fairuza Balk (who had previously been considered for the Dahlia) and Rachel Bilson were also considered for the part. De Palma originally wanted Maggie Gyllenhaal for Short, but she declined as she disliked how the murder was used as a plot device and felt that the story disrespected Short's memory. Rose McGowan auditioned for the part but was eventually cast in a minor role as Short's roommate Sheryl Siddon.

Mia Kirshner was originally only hired as a casting assistant for auditions; the original screenplay did not feature her character onscreen. However, De Palma, impressed by Kirshner, ultimately wrote Short's character into the film via screen test sequences and several flashbacks "where you see her life degenerating." Kirshner said she felt a tremendous responsibility to do justice to the real Short and to honor her memory. She made a decision not to look at the original autopsy photos and to focus on Short as she had been in life. Kirshner would receive critical acclaim for her performance.

=== Filming ===
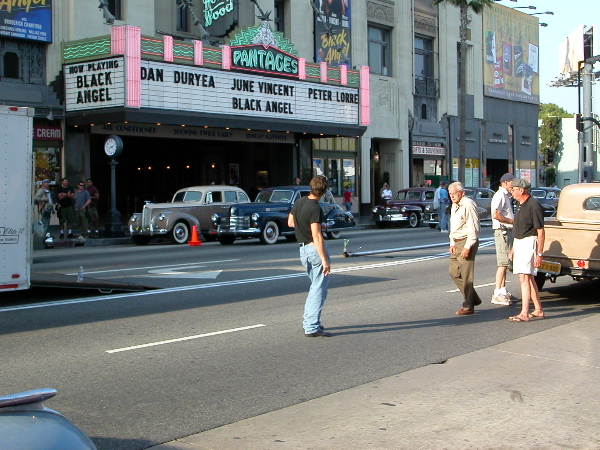
The film shooting on location in Hollywood, June 2005; Black Angel is on the marquee

De Palma initially intended to shoot the film in France. Production designer Dante Ferretti began designing sets for the film in Italy. Principal photography began on April 1, 2005, in Pernik and later Sofia, Bulgaria, at an estimated cost of $50 million. At the time, it was the most expensive film ever shot in the country. A standing set on the backlot of Nu Boyana Film Studios in Sofia was used to represent Leimert Park.

Only a handful of exterior scenes were filmed in Los Angeles: MacArthur Park, Pantages Theatre (and adjoining bar The Frolic Room) at Hollywood and Vine and the Alto-Nido Apartments are perhaps the most recognizable landmarks.

Stan Winston Studios designed some of the film's practical effects, including the prop dummy of Short's corpse that appears early in the film; the dummy prop was publicly auctioned in June 2022. Scenes from the 1928 film The Man Who Laughs also appear in the film.

The film represented De Palma's fourth and final collaboration with cinematographer Vilmos Zsigmond. The two had last worked together on 1990's The Bonfire of the Vanities. The Black Dahlia was shot on Kodak Vision2 stock with the Arriflex 435 and the Arricam series, and was edited digitally on Avid and finished in Autodesk Lustre.

=== Music ===
James Horner was originally on board the project to score the film's music but in February 2006, it was reported that Mark Isham had replaced him.

=== Editing ===
De Palma's initial cut of the film ran over three hours long, but was cut down to a little over two hours at the insistence of the producers. Author Ellroy, who was highly critical of the released version, claims this rough cut is a superior version of the film and a more faithful adaptation of his novel.

== Release ==
The film premiered in-competition at the 63rd Venice International Film Festival. It was released in the United States on September 15, 2006 by Universal Pictures.

=== Home media ===
Universal Pictures Home Entertainment released The Black Dahlia on DVD on December 26, 2006. A Blu-ray edition was issued by Universal on September 7, 2010. Mill Creek Entertainment reissued the film on Blu-ray in July 2022, though bonus materials found on the Universal disc are absent from this release.

== Reception ==
=== Box office ===
The film opened on September 15, 2006, in 2,226 theaters and came in second place over its opening weekend (behind fellow newcomer Gridiron Gang), with $10 million. It ended its theatrical run after domestically grossing $22.5 million in North America and $27.8 million in foreign countries for a global total of $49.3 million, against a budget of $50 million.

=== Critical response ===
Highly anticipated by many after the success of L.A. Confidential, the film received mixed to negative reviews from critics. At Rotten Tomatoes, the film holds an approval rating of 32%, based on 192 reviews, with an average rating of 4.85/10. The site's consensus states, "Though this ambitious noir crime-drama captures the atmosphere of its era, it suffers from subpar performances, a convoluted story, and the inevitable comparisons to other, more successful films of its genre." On Metacritic, the film has a score 49 out of 100, based on 35 critics, indicating "mixed or average reviews". On CinemaScore, audiences gave the film an average grade of "D+" on an A+ to F scale.

David Denby of The New Yorker described the film as:

A kind of fattened goose that's been stuffed with goose-liver pâté. It's overrich and fundamentally unsatisfying... There are scenes that display De Palma's customary visual brilliance... (b)ut the movie is so complicated, the narrative so awkward, that when the pieces of the puzzle fall into place we get no tingle of satisfaction.

Peter Travers of Rolling Stone magazine commented that "De Palma throws everything at the screen, but almost nothing sticks." J. Hoberman of The Village Voice stated that the film "rarely achieves the rhapsodic (let alone the delirious)." Jeff Simon of The Buffalo News deemed The Black Dahlia "the worst major film of the year" and "a wicked Saturday Night Live spoof of film noir," citing its casting as a substantial issue.

However, Kirshner's performance as Short was praised by many critics: Stephanie Zacharek of Salon, in a largely negative review, notes that the eponymous character was "played wonderfully by Mia Kirshner". Mick LaSalle wrote that Kirshner "makes a real impression of the Dahlia as a sad, lonely dreamer, a pathetic figure." Today called Kirshner "perfectly cast" while J. R. Jones of the Chicago Reader described her performance as "haunting" and that the film's fictional screen tests "deliver the emotional darkness so lacking in the rest of the movie."

=== Accolades ===
Institution	Year	Category	Nominee	Result
Academy Award	2007	Best Cinematography	Vilmos Zsigmond	Nominated
Alliance of Women Film Journalists	2006	Hall of Shame		Won
American Society of Cinematographers	2006	Outstanding Achievement in Cinematography in Theatrical Releases	Vilmos Zsigmond	Nominated
Gran Premio Internazionale del Doppiaggio	2007	Audience Award for Best Voice Actor	Adriano Giannini	Nominated
Gran Premio Internazionale del Doppiaggio	2007	Audience Award for Best Voice Actress	Laura Lenghi	Nominated
Gran Premio Internazionale del Doppiaggio	2007	Audience Award for Best Voice Actress	Ilaria Stagni	Nominated
Golden Reel Awards	2007	Best Sound Editing for Sound Effects and Foley in a Foreign Film	Paula Fairfield, Carla Murray, Jill Purdy, Lee de Lang, Nathan Robitaille, Lisa J. Levine , Steve Baine	Nominated
Hollywood Film Awards	2006	Cinematographer of the Year	Vilmos Zsigmond	Won
Nastro d'Argento	2007	Best Production Design	Dante Ferretti	Won
Satellite Awards	2006	Best Cinematography	Vilmos Zsigmond	Nominated
Satellite Awards	2006	Best Costume Design	Jenny Beavan	Nominated
Teen Choice Award	2007	Choice Movie Actress – Drama	Scarlett Johansson (also for The Prestige)	Nominated
Stinkers Bad Movie Awards	2006	Worst Sense of Direction	Brian De Palma	Nominated
Stinkers Bad Movie Awards	2006	Worst Supporting Actress	Fiona Shaw	Nominated
Stinkers Bad Movie Awards	2006	Worst On-Screen Couple	Josh Hartnett, Aaron Eckhart, Hilary Swank & Scarlett Johansson	Nominated
Stinkers Bad Movie Awards	2006	Worst Ensemble		Nominated
Venice Film Festival	2006	Golden Lion	Brian De Palma	Nominated

== Bibliography ==
- Keesey, Douglas (2015). Brian De Palma's Split-Screen: A Life in Film. Jackson, Mississippi: University Press of Mississippi. ISBN 978-1-628-46698-0.
