= L.A. Quartet =

Novel by James Ellroy

The L.A. Quartet is a sequence of four crime fiction novels by James Ellroy set in the late 1940s through the late 1950s in Los Angeles. They are:

- (1987) The Black Dahlia
- (1988) The Big Nowhere
- (1990) L.A. Confidential
- (1992) White Jazz

Elmore Leonard wrote that "reading The Black Dahlia aloud would shatter wine glasses". Several characters from the L.A. Quartet, most notably Dudley Smith, were introduced in Ellroy's 1982 novel Clandestine, which is set between 1951 and 1955 and makes reference to the Black Dahlia killing and Dudley Smith's investigation into it. The four novels, along with The Underworld U.S.A. Trilogy novels, were recently reprinted in 2019 into omnibus editions part of the Everyman's Library series.

Ellroy has also started writing The L.A. Quintet, which takes place before the events of The L.A. Quartet. It includes the real life and fictional characters from The L.A. Quartet and The Underworld U.S.A. Trilogy. Three novels of The Second L.A. Quartet have been released: Perfidia in 2014, This Storm in 2019, and The Enchanters in 2023.

== Summary ==
The Black Dahlia, the first novel in the series, follows a brutal murder in the late 1940s. On January 15, 1947, Elizabeth Short's body was discovered in a vacant lot. Officers Dwight "Bucky" Bleichert and Leland "Lee" Blanchard, partners and local celebrities from their boxing days, aid the investigation.

The next novel, The Big Nowhere, takes place in the early 1950s amidst the Red Scare in Hollywood. Former Los Angeles Police Department (LAPD) detective Buzz Meeks, who now works as an enforcer for gangster Mickey Cohen and a pimp for Howard Hughes, gets caught up in a communist investigation that has ties to a series of homosexual murders that are being investigated by a sheriff's deputy named Danny Upshaw. The work of Meeks and Upshaw also crosses paths with the investigations of Mal Considine and Dudley Smith, who are working on a communist case of their own.

The third novel, L.A. Confidential, spans about eight years—from early 1950 to about April 1958. The story begins on February 21, 1950, when Buzz Meeks is found at an abandoned auto court where he is hiding out. Meeks is killed by Dudley Smith, and the 18 pounds of heroin Meeks stole from a Jack Dragna-Mickey Cohen truce meeting is subsequently retrieved by Smith. A year later, Bloody Christmas occurs: the beating of unarmed suspects by LAPD officers on Christmas Day. Ed Exley, Bud White, and Jack Vincennes are the main officers caught in the scandal. On April 16, 1953, the Nite Owl Massacre becomes the focus of the LAPD. The massacre involved the killing of civilians in an all-night restaurant. Three African Americans are the suspects. While resisting arrest, they are gunned down by Exley, who is proclaimed a hero. Years pass, and new evidence emerges that the African-American youths were innocent of the Nite Owl killings. The case is reopened. Ultimately, between Exley, White, and Vincennes, a criminal conspiracy involving Smith, Stensland, and Meeks is uncovered. It involved Mickey Cohen, the drug rackets, pornography, the stolen heroin from years back, a chemist trying to alter the chemical compound of the heroin to improve it, framing the African-American youths, and at the center of all of it, Dudley Smith. In the end, Smith escapes prosecution. The Nite Owl gunmen are killed, as well as other conspirators in Smith's scheme. Bud White ends up a cripple. Jack Vincennes is killed in the line of duty while trying to stop prisoners from escaping. Ed Exley, now chief of detectives, loses his father, who commits suicide. Although they despised each other at first, Exley and White become friends. Exley swears to White he will bring Dudley Smith down.

The final novel in the L.A. Quartet is White Jazz, told from corrupt LAPD officer Dave Klein's point of view. As a policeman, Klein has broken the law numerous times, beaten suspects, stolen, bribed, worked for the mob, and had people killed, as well as being a murderer himself. In late 1958, Klein, the commander of Administrative Vice, is assigned a burglary of the sanctioned drug-dealing family, the Kafesjians. Klein does not see the case as a priority, but Narcotics Division commander Dan Wilhite and Deputy Chief Ed Exley want the case solved. Klein takes a sideline job from Howard Hughes, who wants Klein to find evidence that would violate an actress's contract. Klein falls in love with his target, Glenda Bledsoe. While working the Kafesjian burglary, Klein discovers that Exley is still trying to bring down Dudley Smith. When he figures that out, Klein begins working with Exley, who tells him all about Dudley. When Klein meets an undercover officer, Johnny Duhamel, who is working Smith on behalf of Exley, Klein is shot up with drugs. Being coerced, Klein murders Duhamel with his Marine sword and is taped committing the murder. Klein is arrested by the FBI the following day for possession of heroin. He becomes a federal witness, and is given 48 hours before he is taken into custody. Klein and Exley discover other Dudley Smith sidelines, selling heroin to the South Los Angeles African-American population, keeping crime in that area "contained", gambling, and voyeuristic pornography tapes. Klein and Exley find the Kafesjians' burglar, Wylie Bullock. Later that night, everything hits Klein: all his crimes and everything that is happening. He decides to meet Smith later that night, who offered Klein a deal earlier. Unbeknownst to Smith, Klein brings Wylie Bullock, who has a grudge against Smith. When the two meet, Bullock attacks Smith, ripping out his eye and slashing his face ear to ear. Klein shoots Bullock and runs off. An all-points bulletin is issued on Klein and he is caught. A custody battle ensues between the FBI and the LAPD for Klein, which the FBI wins. While in federal custody, Klein writes a full confession of everything he has done, and everything that has happened. He has copies sent to Hush-Hush, the Los Angeles Times, and the State Attorney General's Office. However, Klein escapes custody. He hides out with Pete Bondurant (a character who reappears in the Underworld USA Trilogy series' American Tabloid and The Cold Six Thousand). After his escape, Klein's confessions fall on deaf ears, with only Hush-Hush magazine willing to print it. However, they are silenced by legal action and prevented from printing the confession that would have "brought the LAPD to its knees." Howard Hughes feels betrayed by Dave Klein because of the Bledsoe job. He has Bondurant beat him up bad enough to require medical attention. Exley sends Klein a package in the hospital, which includes a blank passport and a gun. Exley says in his note that he considers Smith neutralized, but will allow Klein to kill Smith if he feels justice has not been absolute. Instead, Klein murders J. C. Kafesjian and Tommy Kafesjian. Klein spends one last night with Glenda Bledsoe, takes pictures of her to remember her by, and leaves for the airport. Around late January 1959, Klein leaves the United States. In the epilogue, set many years later (1976 at the earliest), Klein says he plans to return to Los Angeles, with the intentions of making gubernatorial candidate Exley confess to the manipulative deals he made, murder Dick Carlisle and Dudley Smith, and find his lover Glenda Bledsoe.

== Characters ==
=== Dudley Liam Smith ===
Appearances: Clandestine, The Big Nowhere, L.A. Confidential, White Jazz, Perfidia, This Storm

Smith was born in Dublin, Ireland in 1905, and later immigrated to the United States and was raised in Los Angeles, where he joined the LAPD in 1928. In The Big Nowhere, Dudley Smith is described as tall, beefside broad, and red-faced, with brown hair and brown eyes, as well as having a tenor brogue and being Jesuit college-trained. His verbal style also indicates he is a lexophile. In L.A. Confidential, Jack Vincennes tells Bud White and Edmund Exley that Dudley worked in the OSS in Paraguay after World War II. Also, in White Jazz a newspaper story mentions he was a World War II OSS spymaster, has a wife and five daughters, and has killed eight men in the line of duty. Smith was the clandestine protector of two rival criminal families, the Herricks and the Kafesjians, in the 1930s. In 1942 he murdered José Diaz in the infamous Sleepy Lagoon murder case. He is first mentioned in Clandestine, which is set in 1951, and again in 1950 in The Big Nowhere, where he is recruited by Deputy D.A. Ellis Loew to investigate communist influence in Hollywood. He and his partner Mal Considine pursue this assignment with vigor. It was in this book that the extent of his personal corruption was revealed; as well as José Diaz, Dudley and his men were involved in other criminal activities, and in February 1950 Dudley personally tracked down and killed protagonist Buzz Meeks as is stated in the prologue to L.A. Confidential. By 1950 Dudley had reached the rank of Lieutenant, and he would remain there throughout the 1950s, until his promotion to Captain in 1958. By this time, his personal rivalry with fellow LAPD Captain Edmund Exley resulted in a power struggle between both men, which Edmund Exley won when Smith was attacked by a man named Wylie Bullock. This attack left him with brain damage that rendered him essentially semi-lucid, and only rarely lucid. Also in the attack, he lost an eye, and is paralyzed, and will probably never be able to walk again. It is unknown when Dudley died; however, he is apparently still alive—albeit confined to a nursing home—in 1976, as is revealed in the epilogue to White Jazz. He returns in Perfidia, set in 1941.

Smith was thoroughly unscrupulous, ruthless, and evil. He had a large list of crimes that he had committed, including theft, pornography distribution, murder, and most disturbingly, infanticide—Dudley personally strangled the two-day-old baby of the Herrick family in 1937. He was a hard line anti-communist, declaring that he hated the "Red filth worse than Satan". Dudley's racism was also well known, particularly in regards to Jews, and he was a notable proponent of "containment"; as he explained it, keeping the "nigger filth" in African-American areas.

Smith is portrayed by James Cromwell in the film adaptation of L.A. Confidential and portrayed in the 2003 television pilot of L.A. Confidential by Tom Nowicki. In a departure from the novel, Smith is killed by Exley at the end of a shootout.

=== Ed Exley ===
Appearances: L.A. Confidential, White Jazz

Edmund Jennings Exley is one of the three protagonists in L.A. Confidential, and a major supporting character in White Jazz. He is the son of Preston Exley, former cop turned construction tycoon, and Marguerite Exley, née Tibbetts. When he was seventeen his brother Thomas Exley, also a cop, was fatally gunned down by an unidentified purse snatcher (referred to as "Rollo Tomasi" in the film, and kills Preston Exley, instead of Thomas Exley, in the film). Ed is relentlessly ambitious, politically savvy, and highly intelligent, trying to surpass his father as a policeman and live out late Thomas's dreams. He is instilled with a belief in "absolute justice" from his father.

He has come from a family of cops, but also has a trust fund from his mother after she died of cancer 6 years earlier. Stated in the novel Exley men have been police since the formation of the Scotland Yard. A summa cum laude graduate of UCLA at nineteen in 1941, Exley joined the war effort shortly after joining the LAPD in 1943. He served in the Pacific Theater and toward the end of his tour of duty experienced the variable ways of manipulating the truth to one's benefit. Anticipating an attack, Exley volunteers for a scout run. As predicted, the Japanese forces assault with a bayonet charge. When Exley returns, his platoon is dead and a patrol is approaching. He hides under the bodies of his former brothers-in-arms. After the patrol passes he decides to head to battalion headquarters. On the way, he passes a Shinto shrine of soldiers who committed suicide over capture or death by disease. He finds weaponry and a flamethrower nearby. He lays the guns out around the dead. With the flamethrower, he torches the bodies, knowing his cowardice would be evident and would be rotated to another platoon if he didn't commit this act. Recon finds Exley having "fought off" twenty-nine enemies. He is awarded the Distinguished Service Cross and his story is published in the Examiner.

Exley's next brush with opportunity, chance and truth occurs on Christmas Eve during the Bloody Christmas Scandal of 1951. A rise in rank and glory come with his testimony against his brother officers, but not without the stigma of becoming a turncoat and pariah. A hate relationship develops with Bud White, due to his testifying and because White's partner, Dick Stensland, is incarcerated and, later, goes to the gas chamber. Exley was the arresting officer in the crimes which led to Stensland receiving the death penalty, and was in attendance (as was White) when Stensland was executed.

The Nite Owl slayings, however, bring him acceptance. Several patrons of an all-night coffee shop are brutally shotgunned to death. Although in custody, the suspects escape. Exley finds them and guns them down although they were unarmed. As the years pass, Exley is given captaincy over Internal Affairs. He also makes other numerous cases with a conviction rate in the upper ninety percent. When the Nite Owl case is reopened due to the circumstantial evidence of two witnesses, Exley and the rest of the LAPD must solve the case all over again before the Attorney General's Office takes over the investigation and makes the LAPD look incompetent. As the evidence emerges and connections are established between the suspects in a web of complex conspiracies (stretching back decades), it becomes clear that his father himself did not properly clear his own famous case, The Loren Atherton case. With the aid of Bud White and Jack Vincennes, the trio ultimately solve the Nite Owl Case. Following a botched raid on a prison break via train, White is critically wounded. Exley visits him and finds evidence White built for his own case against a serial killer of prostitutes. When Exley finds the evidence, he learns the true meaning of absolute justice: anonymous, humble, no rank or glory. While conventional justice is not meted out, with Exley entrusting the second murderer of the Loren Atherton case to a known doctor, Dr. Terry Lux, and the ultimate mastermind behind the Nite Owl and other crimes, Dudley Smith cannot be convicted due to lack of evidence, Exley vows he will take down Dudley Smith if it's the last thing he ever does.

In White Jazz Exley is a deputy chief as a result of solving the Nite Owl. He has become colder and more determined in achieving his goals. He unwillingly allows Dave Klein to keep his job, despite Klein's obvious corruption. Exley continues his crusade in attempting to take down Dudley Smith. He uses an undercover police cadet and Klein to attain this goal. During a burglary into Exley's house for monetary gain, Klein finds numerous photos of Dudley Smith. Klein calls the photos "Exley hate fuel". During an earlier meeting at Exley's house, Klein mentions that as evil as Dudley is, Exley is a hypocrite in the way he uses people like Dudley. White Jazz sees the end of the corrupt Narcotics Division and its sanctioned dealers, the Kafesjians. Due to severe brain damage and wounds, Dudley remains in hospital care his whole life and a special pension fund approved by Exley himself, since the revelations about the LAPD's blatant corruption would "bring the LAPD to its knees", as stated in Hush-Hush. With Klein a fugitive, Exley gets word to him in a package. It states he will not pursue Klein for his burglary because he used Klein to accomplish his mission. His package also includes a blank passport and a .38 revolver with a silencer in case Klein feels absolute justice has not been achieved regarding Dudley. He also states Dudley has cost him enough as it is.

According to White Jazz's epilogue told by Klein, Exley ascends to the rank of chief of police. He also develops a political career, from congressman, lieutenant governor and a candidate for governor. However, Klein plans to make Exley confess all his deals he has ever cut.

In the L.A. Confidential film adaptation, he is portrayed by Guy Pearce and in the 2003 television pilot of L.A. Confidential, he is portrayed by David Conrad.

=== Meyer Harris "Mickey" Cohen ===
Appearances: The Big Nowhere, L.A. Confidential, White Jazz, Perfidia

Mickey Cohen was a real-life gangster active in Los Angeles, but his exploits in Ellroy's novels are mostly fictional. Cohen has a large supporting role in The Big Nowhere which includes his relations with Buzz Meeks, who was one of the protagonists of The Big Nowhere. He is portrayed briefly by Paul Guilfoyle in the L.A. Confidential film adaptation.

=== Wendell A. "Bud" White ===
Appearance: L.A. Confidential

Bud White was one of the major protagonists in L.A. Confidential. In the book he begins as an incredibly violent cop, who takes out his anger on wife beaters. This is shown to be because of his violent father who killed his mother in a drunken rage. Because of his quick temper and brutality Bud became the most feared cop on the force with nobody wishing to feel the brunt of his anger. However, he is shown to be sensitive with women and goes out of his way to help them. This is shown when he becomes obsessed with tracking down a serial killer targeting young prostitutes. During the course of the book Bud has a long-standing feud with Ed Exley, due to Exley informing the D.A. of Bud's involvement in the Bloody Christmas fiasco. This almost makes Bud lose his job until Dudley Smith recruits him into the homicide division, which Dudley operates. However, Bud's partner Dick Stensland is left as a scapegoat for the investigative D.A. and is imprisoned; this only fuels Bud's vendetta against Exley. Dudley recruited Bud because of his brutal strength and uses him as an enforcer. However, when it becomes clear that Dudley is corrupt and is using him for his own nefarious schemes, Bud drops his conflict with Exley and joins forces with him and Jack Vincennes to take Dudley Smith down. However, during the investigation he is gravely wounded and is forced to retire. Before he leaves, the newly promoted Ed Exley promises him that he won't let Dudley get away with his crimes. Russell Crowe portrayed Bud in the 1997 adaptation of L.A. Confidential and Josh Hopkins portrayed Bud in the 2003 television pilot of L.A. Confidential.

=== John "Trashcan Jack" Vincennes ===
Appearance: L.A. Confidential

Detective Sergeant Jack Vincennes (? – March 29, 1958) is one of the major characters in L.A. Confidential. Known for being flashy and colorful, as well as taking cases which get the most publicity. He famously arrested Bebop musician Charlie Parker and actor Robert Mitchum on two high-profile pot busts; from a tip off from Sid Hudgens. However, over the course of the book his actions cause an amount of guilt and throw his life into turmoil, such as the loss of his marriage. He allies himself with Bud White and Ed Exley in a way to redeem himself. However, he dies in the book's climax. He is portrayed by Kevin Spacey in the film, who received top billing, despite his secondary role. In the television pilot made in 2003, Vincennes is portrayed by Kiefer Sutherland.

=== Lynn Margaret Bracken ===
Appearance: L.A. Confidential

In the film adaptation of L.A. Confidential, Bracken is portrayed by Kim Basinger, and in the 2003 pilot, she is portrayed by Melissa George.

=== David Douglas "The Enforcer" Klein ===
Appearance: White Jazz

The protagonist of White Jazz. The novel is told through Dave Klein's stream of consciousness, as well as articles and newspaper headlines that accompany many of Ellroy's books. He is an immoral cop who moonlights as a hitman, enforcer, slumlord and lawyer, working for people such as Howard Hughes and the mob. He is portrayed as charismatic and cunning. However, over the course of the novel he begins to lose his edge. Various problems, such as Noonan trying to prosecute him and Exley blackmailing him, cause his life to fall apart.

=== Glenda Louise Bledsoe ===
Appearance: White Jazz

=== Russell A. Millard ===
Appearances: The Black Dahlia, L.A. Confidential

He is portrayed by Mike Starr in The Black Dahlia film.

=== Dwight W. "Bucky" Bleichert ===
Appearances: The Black Dahlia, Perfidia

The main protagonist of The Black Dahlia. An LAPD officer and former light-heavy boxer. The partner of Lee Blanchard, and eventual husband of Kay Lake. He, like his partner, becomes obsessed with the Elizabeth Short murder case. Bucky was portrayed by Josh Hartnett in the film adaptation.

=== Katherine Ann "Kay" Lake ===
Appearances: The Black Dahlia, Perfidia, This Storm

Kay Lake is portrayed by Scarlett Johansson in the film adaptation of The Black Dahlia.

=== Turner Prescott "Buzz" Meeks ===
Appearances: The Black Dahlia, The Big Nowhere, L.A. Confidential, Perfidia, This Storm

Buzz Meeks (April 1906 – February 21, 1950) was once a cop who was known for his extreme corruption and bad performance reports. This bad reputation would eventually cause his dismissal from the LAPD. He would later find work as an enforcer and bodyguard for various figures within L.A.'s underworld including Mickey Cohen as well as movie mogul and business icon Howard Robard Hughes. He was murdered by Dudley Smith in the prologue of the L.A. Confidential novel. In the L.A. Confidential film, Meeks's first name is changed to Leland and he is portrayed by Darrell Sandeen.

=== Ellis Loew ===
Appearances: The Black Dahlia, The Big Nowhere, L.A. Confidential, Perfidia

Ellis Loew is an ambitious and corrupt District Attorney in L.A Confidential whose rise from Deputy D.A. begins in The Black Dahlia. In the film The Black Dahlia he is played by Patrick Fischler. In the film L.A. Confidential he is played by Ron Rifkin.

=== Malcolm E. Considine ===
Appearance: The Big Nowhere

Lieutenant Mal Considine of the Los Angeles District Attorney's Criminal Investigation Bureau was an intelligent, well-intentioned cop, undone by ambition in The Big Nowhere. Bent on making the rank of Captain with the Bureau, he joined Ellis Loew and Dudley Smith on an investigation of Communists in Hollywood. In the course of that investigation, he recruited Danny Upshaw and became his handler while the latter did double-duty on investigations of Communists and a serial killer. His ambition and desire to impress the divorce court resulted in his death at the hands of the serial killer.

=== Daniel Thomas Upshaw ===
Appearance: The Big Nowhere

Detective Deputy Danny Upshaw (1922–1950) of the Los Angeles County Sheriff's Department was a brilliant cop who investigated a horrific string of mutilation murders in The Big Nowhere. When he stumbles upon evidence linking Dudley Smith with an old murder, Smith manipulates him psychologically until he kills himself, partly by threatening to reveal Upshaw's repressed homosexual tendencies. This allowed Smith to breathe free but the serial killer to remain at large.

=== "Rollo Tomasi" ===
Appearance: L.A. Confidential (film)

"Rollo Tomasi" is the made up name of the unknown purse snatcher who killed Ed Exley's father, Preston Exley in the film version of L.A. Confidential. In the novel for L.A. Confidential, the unknown purse snatcher kills Edmund's brother, Thomas Exley, and is not given a made-up name. The name was created and used only for the film.

His identity is unknown and never discovered in both novel and film, and in the film, Exley states to Jack Vincennes he gave the unknown purse snatcher the name for personality. This becomes a vital piece of information when as Jack Vincennes is dying, his last words are "Rollo Tomasi", the name that Exley shared with him. It will also give Exley a clue to his killer when Dudley Smith questions Exley about the name. Rollo Tomasi is also a metaphor for the criminal who gets away with the crime, like the purse snatcher. When Dudley is about to kill Exley, he asks who Rollo Tomasi is, and Exley says Dudley is, for the reasons mentioned before.

=== William Henry Parker III ===
Appearances: L.A. Confidential, White Jazz, Perfidia, This Storm

AKA "Whiskey Bill"

=== Howard Hughes ===
Appearances: The Big Nowhere, White Jazz, Blood's a Rover

=== Sidney Hudgens ===
Appearances: L.A. Confidential, Perfidia, This Storm

Sid Hudgens (?–1953) was a journalist for the gossip magazine Hush-Hush (similar to the real life gossip magazine Confidential). He acts on tip offs from his many contacts within Los Angeles' so called elite and famous. He works closely with John "Trashcan Jack" Vincennes. The two work famously together and make large wads of money between them. Hudgens is killed under mysterious circumstances; but it is later revealed that Dudley Smith is responsible for Hudgens and Vincennes' deaths. In the film adaptation of L.A. Confidential, Hudgens is portrayed by Danny DeVito. In the 2003 pilot, he is portrayed by Pruitt Taylor Vince. In the film L.A. Confidential, Dudley Smith and another corrupt LAPD officer are seen killing Sid Hudgens in cold blood; whereas in the novel, Hudgens' body is just discovered.

=== Burt Arthur "Deuce" Perkins ===
Appearance: L.A. Confidential

He appears as a bass player of the band owned by Spade Cooley. He is shown as a drug addict and generally nasty character in the novel. In the film, however, he appears as Mickey Cohen's drugs lieutenant who is killed by Dudley Smith's men, in order to take control of the L.A. Underworld.

=== John Charles "J.C." Kafesjian ===
Appearance: White Jazz

The LAPD's sanctioned drug dealer.

=== Wylie Davis Bullock ===
Appearance: White Jazz

=== Michael Breuning ===
Appearances: The Big Nowhere, L.A. Confidential, White Jazz, Perfidia, This Storm

Note: Also appears in "Clandestine"

In the film adaptation of L.A. Confidential, is portrayed by Tomas Arana.

=== Richard J. Carlisle ===
Appearances: L.A. Confidential, White Jazz, Perfidia

In the film adaptation of L.A. Confidential, Carlisle is portrayed by Michael McCleery.

=== Pete Bondurant ===
Appearance: White Jazz

Note: Also appears as a main character in the Underworld U.S.A. trilogy.

=== Raymond Dieterling ===
Appearance: L.A. Confidential

Known as the father of modern animation, Ray Dieterling is one of the main supporting characters in L.A. Confidential. Friend of Preston Exley and later Inez Soto, Dieterling created characters similar to Walt Disney's. Dierterling's characters like Moochie Mouse and Danny Duck are similar to Disney's Mickey Mouse and Donald Duck, respectively.

=== Inez Soto ===
Appearance: L.A. Confidential

In the film adaptation of L.A. Confidential, Soto is portrayed by Marisol Padilla Sánchez.

=== Domenico "Chick" Vecchio ===
Appearance: White Jazz

=== Salvatore "Touch" Vecchio ===
Appearance: White Jazz

=== Pierce Morehouse Patchett ===
Appearances: L.A. Confidential, Perfidia

Pierce Patchett (June 30, 1902 – March 27, 1958) is a procurer of prostitutes that resemble movies stars and one of the main antagonists in L.A. Confidential. In the film adaptation of L.A. Confidential, Patchett is portrayed by David Strathairn. In the 2003 pilot, he is portrayed by Eric Roberts.

=== George "Junior" Stemmons, Jr. ===
Appearance: White Jazz

=== Leland Charles "Lee" Blanchard ===
Appearances: The Black Dahlia, Perfidia, This Storm

Known as "Mr. Fire" in the boxing world for his fighting style and personality, Blanchard is an ex-boxer cop who becomes Dwight "Bucky" Bleichert's partner on Warrants after their publicity boxing match to rally support behind a pay increase bond for the police. The publicity and the match are enough for the voters to vote in favor of the bond. Both Blanchard and Bleichert benefit from this, they are rewarded with a prestigious assignment on Warrants, which involves serving high risk warrants, and finding fugitives, i. e. going after real bad guys. "Mr. Fire" and "Mr. Ice," Blanchard and Bleichert, respectively, become partners. They are highly effective team, known for catching many criminals. Blanchard also is involved with Kay Lake, someone he saved from the criminal underworld, and has a chaste love for. Blanchard, Bleichert, and Lake become best friends, referred to as a "fairy tale triangle." However, after the murder of Elizabeth Short, also known as the Black Dahlia, Blanchard heads into a downward spiral. Feeling compelled and obsessed to solve the case because his younger sister Laurie Blanchard went missing when he was young, and was most likely murdered, he has strong feelings of guilt and feels his solving his cases "chalk one up for Laurie Blanchard." As well as solving the case might atone for losing Laurie. Combined with that, his continuing use of Benzedrine, and the soon to be paroled Robert "Bobby" De Witt, a criminal he sent to prison, Blanchard becomes completely unhinged. Following a lead on Elizabeth Short and De Witt in Tijuana, Mexico, Blanchard heads there. After an extended period of time with no contact or information on Blanchard, Bleichert heads to Tijuana to find answers. However, Bleichert finds a decayed Blanchard in a body pit, with very few leads on who the murderers were. This leaves Bleichert and Kay to deal with the repercussions. In the 2006 film adaptation of The Black Dahlia, Lee Blanchard is portrayed by Aaron Eckhart.

=== John "Johnny" Stompanato ===
Appearances: The Big Nowhere, L.A. Confidential

Johnny Stompanato (October 10, 1925 – April 4, 1958) was a bodyguard and member of Mickey Cohen's gang. He was portrayed by Paolo Seganti in the film adaptation of L.A. Confidential.

=== Welles Noonan ===
Appearance: White Jazz

=== Robert Gallaudet ===
Appearances: L.A. Confidential, White Jazz

A former LAPD sergeant who acts as D.A. Ellis Loew's Bureau “whip” in the investigations into both “Bloody Christmas” and the Nite Owl slayings. Gallaudet eventually passes the bar and becomes a prosecutor, eventually rising to become D.A. after Ellis Loew resigns. He becomes an ally of Ed Exley during the Nite Owl investigation, and was also a law school classmate of Dave Klein. It later turns out that he was working with Dudley Smith, who has Gallaudet killed to tie up loose ends.

=== Johnny Duhamel ===
Appearance: White Jazz

=== Dan Wilhite ===
Appearance: White Jazz

Dan Wilhite is the head of the LAPD's Narcotics division, in the final novel of Ellroy's L.A. Quartet, "White Jazz." For many years he had overseen the tacit agreement between the LAPD and the Kafesjian family, the latter being sanctioned drug dealers in the southside area of LA. As the novel progresses Wilhite desperately attempts to contain the burglary investigation, headed by Klein at Exley's instigation to prevent years of police corruption from being revealed. He commits suicide.

=== Jack Woods ===
Appearance: White Jazz

=== Spade Cooley ===
Appearance: L.A. Confidential

=== Wino Will-o-the-Wisp ===
Appearances: White Jazz

Unknown serial killer murdering the homeless in White Jazz.

=== Jack Dragna ===
Appearance: The Big Nowhere

Jack Dragna is an organized crime boss and rival of Mickey Cohen.

=== Will Shipstad ===
Appearance: White Jazz

=== Lester Lake ===
Appearance: White Jazz

=== Frederick Turentine ===
Appearances: L.A. Confidential, White Jazz

=== Preston Exley ===
Appearances: L.A. Confidential, Perfidia

Father of Edmund Exley. In the 2003 pilot, he is portrayed by Robert Foxworth.

=== Arthur De Spain ===
Appearance: L.A. Confidential

=== Timmy Valburn ===
Appearance: L.A. Confidential

=== Lee Peter Vachss ===
Appearance: L.A. Confidential

=== Richard Alex Stensland ===
Appearance: L.A. Confidential

In the film adaptation of L.A. Confidential, Stensland is portrayed by Graham Beckel. And is one of the victims in the "Nite Owl Massacre"; which differs from the novel which has Stensland arrested for the Bloody Christmas scandal

=== Abraham Teitlebaum ===
Appearance: L.A. Confidential

=== Dot Rothstein ===
Appearances: L.A. Confidential, Perfidia, This Storm

=== Malcolm Robert Lunceford ===
Appearance: L.A. Confidential

Mal Lunceford (June 2, 1912 – April 16, 1953) was one of the victims in the infamous Nite Owl Massacre case.

=== Delbert Melvin "Duke" Cathcart ===
Appearance: L.A. Confidential.

Delbert Melvin "Duke" Cathcart (November 14, 1914 - April 19, 1953); a criminal character and victim of the famed "Nite Owl Massacre". He is a character that actually; although is dead, helps crack the case.

=== David Mertens ===
Appearance: L.A. Confidential

=== Jerry Marsalas ===
Appearance: L.A. Confidential

=== Terry Lux ===
Appearances: The Big Nowhere, L.A. Confidential, Perfidia, This Storm

=== Ray Pinker ===
Appearance: "LA Confidential", "White Jazz", Perfidia, This Storm

Ray Pinker is a forensic scientist.

=== Audrey Anders ===
Appearance: The Big Nowhere

=== Coleman Healy ===
Appearance: The Big Nowhere

=== Eugene Niles ===
Appearance: The Big Nowhere

=== Felix Gordean ===
Appearance: The Big Nowhere

=== Saul Lesnick ===
Appearances: The Big Nowhere, Perfidia, This Storm

=== Claire Katherine De Haven ===
Appearances: The Big Nowhere, Perfidia, This Storm

=== Reynolds Loftis ===
Appearances: The Big Nowhere, Perfidia

== See also ==
- Noir fiction
- The Underworld U.S.A. Trilogy

=== Novel and film references ===
- Ellroy, James. The Black Dahlia, Warner Books, 2006, ISBN 978-0-446-61812-0
- Ellroy, James. The Big Nowhere, Mysterious Press, 1998, ISBN 0-446-67437-0
- Ellroy, James. L.A. Confidential, Warner Books, 1997, ISBN 0-446-67424-9
- Ellroy, James. White Jazz, Vintage Books, 2001, ISBN 0-375-72736-1
- The Black Dahlia (film)
- L.A. Confidential (film)
- Ellroy, James. The L.A. Quartet, Everyman's Library, 2019, ISBN 978-1-101-90805-1 (US), ISBN 978-1-84159-388-3 (UK)

=== Real life events ===
- Battle of Chavez Ravine
- The Black Dahlia murder
- Bloody Christmas
- Brenda Allen scandal
- Sleepy Lagoon murder
- Zoot Suit Riots
