= Mary Madkour =

American politician

Member of the Vermont House of Representatives from the Bennington 2-3 district
- In office January 1993 – January 8, 1997
- Preceded by: J. Russell Carpenter
- Succeeded by: Mary A. Morrissey

Personal details
- Born: Mary Elaine Bliss; April 12, 1927 Swanton, Vermont, U.S.
- Died: January 7, 2013 (aged 85) Bennington, Vermont, U.S.
- Party: Republican
- Spouse(s): Walter Allen McGarey (m. 1950; died 1964) Joseph Louis Madkour (m. 1966; died 2000)

Mary McGarey Madkour (April 12, 1927 – January 7, 2013) was a US Republican politician who was elected to two terms in the Vermont House of Representatives, from 1993 to 1997, but not re-elected in 1996.

== Electoral history ==
Date	Election	Candidate	Party	Votes	%
Vermont House of Representatives, Bennington 2-3 district
Nov 3, 1992	General	Timothy R. Corcoran	Democratic	2,384	43.35
Nov 3, 1992	General	Mary McGarey Madkour	Republican	1,656	30.11
Nov 3, 1992	General	J. Russell Carpenter	Democratic	1,459	26.53
Nov 3, 1992	General	Write-Ins		0	0.00
Nov 3, 1992	General	Incumbent lost; seat switched from Democratic to Republican			
Nov 8, 1994	General	Timothy R. Corcoran	Democratic	1,714	53.10
Nov 8, 1994	General	Mary McGarey Madkour	Republican	1,514	46.90
Nov 8, 1994	General	Write-Ins		0	0.00
Nov 5, 1996	General	Mary A. Morrissey	Republican	1,561	30.54
Nov 5, 1996	General	Peter J. Brady, Sr.	Democratic	1,262	24.69
Nov 5, 1996	General	Mary McGarey Madkour	Republican	1,244	24.34
Nov 5, 1996	General	Alexandra Cohen	Democratic	1,038	20.31
Nov 5, 1996	General	Write-Ins		6	0.12

Vermont House of Representatives
Preceded by J. Russell Carpenter	Vermont Representative from the Bennington 2-3 District; 1993–1997; Served alongside: Timothy R. Corcoran, Peter J. Brady	Succeeded by Mary A. Morrissey
