= Anne Lamy Mook =

American politician (born 1947)

Member of the Vermont House of Representatives from the Bennington 2-2 district
- In office January 5, 2005 – January 7, 2015
- Preceded by: Albert Krawczyk
- Succeeded by: Kiah Morris

Personal details
- Born: Anne Hastings Lamy; November 24, 1947 (age 78) Northampton, Massachusetts, United States
- Party: Democratic
- Spouse: Wesley Mook
- Education: University of Hartford (BS)

Anne H. Lamy Mook (born November 24, 1947) is an American politician who served in the Vermont House of Representatives from 2005 to 2015. A Democrat, she defeated incumbent representative Albert Krawczyk, who had switched over to the Republican Party, in 2004 and in a rematch in 2006. She did not seek reelection in 2014.

== Electoral history ==
Date	Election	Candidate	Party	Votes	%
Vermont House of Representatives, Bennington 2-2 district
Nov 2, 2004	General	Mary A. Morrissey	Republican	2,214	37.10
Nov 2, 2004	General	Anne Lamy Mook	Democratic	1,578	26.45
Nov 2, 2004	General	Albert C. Krawczyk	Republican	1,522	25.51
Nov 2, 2004	General	Claude DeLucia	Progressive	650	10.89
Nov 2, 2004	General	Write-Ins		3	0.05
Nov 7, 2006	General	Mary A. Morrissey	Republican	1,616	35.18
Nov 7, 2006	General	Anne Lamy Mook	Democratic	1,474	32.08
Nov 7, 2006	General	Albert C. Krawczyk	Republican	1,080	23.51
Nov 7, 2006	General	Claude DeLucia	Progressive	419	9.12
Nov 7, 2006	General	Write-Ins		5	0.11
Nov 4, 2008	General	Mary A. Morrissey	Republican	2,382	50.49
Nov 4, 2008	General	Anne Lamy Mook	Democratic	2,315	49.07
Nov 4, 2008	General	Write-Ins		21	0.44
Nov 2, 2010	General	Mary A. Morrissey	Republican	1,600	39.56
Nov 2, 2010	General	Anne Lamy Mook	Democratic	1,316	32.54
Nov 2, 2010	General	Brandy J. Reynolds	Democratic	807	19.96
Nov 2, 2010	General	Claude DeLucia	Progressive	321	7.94
Nov 2, 2010	General	Write-Ins		0	0.00
Nov 6, 2012	General	Mary A. Morrissey	Republican	1,896	40.49
Nov 6, 2012	General	Anne Lamy Mook	Democratic	1,896	40.49
Nov 6, 2012	General	Dale Gerity	Democratic	890	19.01
Nov 6, 2012	General	Write-Ins		0	0.00

Vermont House of Representatives
Preceded by Albert Krawczyk	Vermont Representative from the Bennington 2-2 District; 2005–2015; Served alongside: Mary A. Morrissey	Succeeded by Kiah Morris
