= Tom Blakely =

American politician

Member-elect of the Vermont House of Representatives from the Bennington-5 district
- Assuming office January 2027
- Succeeding: Mary A. Morrissey

Personal details
- Party: Democratic
- Website: tomblakely.com

Tom Blakely is an American politician. A member of the Democratic Party, he is the member-elect for the Bennington-5 district of the Vermont House of Representatives.
