= Jim Carroll (Vermont politician) =

American politician

Member of the Vermont House of Representatives from the Bennington 2-2 district
- Incumbent
- Assumed office January 4, 2023 Serving with Mary A. Morrissey
- Preceded by: Michael Nigro
- In office January 8, 2019 – January 6, 2021
- Preceded by: Kiah Morris
- Succeeded by: Michael Nigro

Personal details
- Born: October 25, 1961 (age 64) Bennington, Vermont, U.S.
- Party: Democratic
- Education: Southern Vermont College

James Carroll (born October 25, 1961) is an American politician who has served since 2019 as a member of the Vermont House of Representatives. He is a member of the Democratic Party. He replaced Representative Kiah Morris on the ballot when she decided not to run for reelection in 2018.

In February 2024, Carroll was arrested for allegedly driving under the influence after being stopped by police for a loud muffler. His plea hearing was delayed because he was undergoing treatment at a rehabilitation center. He then pleaded not guilty to the charges in April 2024.

== 2024 harassment incident ==
In January 2024, Carroll noticed that the canvas tote bag that he brought to work was filled with water from an unknown source. His bag was then filled with water multiple times over a period of five months. He suspected a Republican member of the Vermont House of Representatives, Mary Ann Morrissey, who also represents Bennington, to be the culprit, but had no evidence to prove the theory. Carroll decided to use a hidden video camera to record footage of his bag in order to find what was happening.

On June 7, 2024, Carroll told Seven Days, an independent Vermont news publication, that he had captured footage of Morrissey pouring cups of water into his bag on two separate days. On June 11, 2024, the footage was publicly released. Carroll has stated that Morrissey had been "nasty" to him for months and that she had "verbally harassed" him on several occasions for his policy decisions.

On June 17, Morrissey apologized publicly in front of the Vermont House of Representatives. She did not state a motivation for her actions. As a result of the incident, a formal investigation was opened by the House's ethics panel. As of June 18, 2024, Carroll has not decided whether or not to pursue charges against Morrissey.

Vermont House of Representatives
| Preceded by Kiah Morris | Vermont Representative from the Bennington 2-2 District; 2019–2021; Served alongside: Mary A. Morrissey | Succeeded by Michael Nigro |
