= Albert Krawczyk =

American politician

Member of the Vermont House of Representatives
- In office January 1999 – January 5, 2005
- Preceded by: Peter J. Brady
- Succeeded by: Anne Lamy Mook
- Constituency: Bennington 2-3 (1999‍–‍2003); Bennington 2-2 (2003‍–‍2005)

Personal details
- Born: Albert Chester Krawczyk; August 24, 1934 (age 91) Shaftsbury, Vermont, U.S.
- Party: Democratic (until 2002); Republican (since 2002)
- Spouse: Joan Ellen Blanchard (m. 1956)
- Occupation: Photographer; politician

Military service
- Branch/service: United States Army
- Years of service: 1953–1956
- Battles/wars: Korean War

Albert Chester Krawczyk (born August 24, 1934) is an American politician who served three terms in the Vermont House of Representatives. Elected each time as a Democrat, he announced in November 2002 that he was switching to the Republican Party. He lost his 2004 bid for reelection as well as a 2006 rematch against Anne Lamy Mook. His cousin, Joseph L. Krawczyk Jr., served in the House from 2003 to 2011.

== Electoral history ==
Date	Election	Candidate	Party	Votes	%
Vermont House of Representatives, Bennington 2-3 district
Nov 3, 1998	General	Mary A. Morrissey	Republican	1,560	51.64
Nov 3, 1998	General	Albert C. Krawczyk	Democratic	1,452	48.06
Nov 3, 1998	General	Write-Ins		9	0.30
Nov 3, 1998	General	Peter Brady did not seek reelection; seat stayed Democratic			
Nov 7, 2000	General	Mary A. Morrissey	Republican	1,935	41.19
Nov 7, 2000	General	Albert C. Krawczyk	Democratic	1,595	33.95
Nov 7, 2000	General	Judy Murphy	Democratic	1,168	24.86
Nov 7, 2000	General	Write-Ins		0	0.00
Vermont House of Representatives, Bennington 2-2 district
Nov 5, 2002	General	Mary A. Morrissey	Republican	1,936	54.02
Nov 5, 2002	General	Albert C. Krawczyk	Democratic	1,629	45.45
Nov 5, 2002	General	Write-Ins		19	0.53
Nov 5, 2002	General	District redrawn; change from Democratic to split Republican/Democratic			
Nov 2, 2004	General	Mary A. Morrissey	Republican	2,214	37.10
Nov 2, 2004	General	Anne Lamy Mook	Democratic	1,578	26.45
Nov 2, 2004	General	Albert Krawczyk	Republican	1,522	25.51
Nov 2, 2004	General	Claude DeLucia	Progressive	650	10.89
Nov 2, 2004	General	Write-Ins		3	0.05
Nov 7, 2006	General	Mary A. Morrissey	Republican	1,616	35.18
Nov 7, 2006	General	Anne Lamy Mook	Democratic	1,474	32.08
Nov 7, 2006	General	Albert Krawczyk	Republican	1,080	23.51
Nov 7, 2006	General	Claude DeLucia	Progressive	419	9.12
Nov 7, 2006	General	Write-Ins		5	0.11

Vermont House of Representatives
Preceded by Peter J. Brady	Vermont Representative from the Bennington 2-3 District; 1999–2003; Served alongside: Mary A. Morrissey	Succeeded by None
Preceded by Betty Bolognani	Vermont Representative from the Bennington 2-2 District; 2003–2005; Served alongside: Mary A. Morrissey	Succeeded by Anne Lamy Mook
