= Peter J. Brady =

American politician

Peter Brady

Member of the Vermont House of Representatives from the Bennington 2-3 district
- In office May 18, 1995 – January 1999
- Preceded by: Timothy R. Corcoran
- Succeeded by: Albert Krawczyk

Personal details
- Born: Peter Joseph Brady; May 24, 1962 (age 64) Brooklyn, New York, U.S.
- Party: Democratic
- Education: Community College of Vermont

Peter Joseph Brady Sr. (born May 24, 1962) is an American labor leader and Democratic Party politician who served as a member of the Vermont House of Representatives. In May 1995, following state representative Timothy R. Corcoran's resignation to become Bennington town clerk, Governor Howard Dean appointed Brady, then a vice president of the Vermont Labor Council, to serve the remainder of Corcoran's term. He won election to a full term in 1996 alongside Republican Mary A. Morrissey.

== Electoral history ==
Date	Election	Candidate	Party	Votes	%
Vermont House of Representatives, Bennington 2-3 district
Nov 5, 1996	General	Mary A. Morrissey	Republican	1,561	30.54
Nov 5, 1996	General	Peter J. Brady, Sr.	Democratic	1,262	24.69
Nov 5, 1996	General	Mary McGarey Madkour	Republican	1,244	24.34
Nov 5, 1996	General	Alexandra Cohen	Democratic	1,038	20.31
Nov 5, 1996	General	Write-Ins		6	0.12

Vermont House of Representatives
Preceded by Timothy R. Corcoran	Vermont Representative from the Bennington 2-3 District; 1995–1999; Served alongside: Mary Madkour, Mary A. Morrissey	Succeeded by Albert Krawczyk
