= The Big Nowhere =

Novel by James Ellroy

- First edition cover
- Author: James Ellroy
- Cover artist: Jacket design by Barbara Buck; Jacket illustration by Stephen Peringer
- Language: English
- Series: L.A. Quartet
- Genre: Crime fiction, noir, historical fiction
- Publisher: The Mysterious Press
- Publication date: September 1988
- Publication place: United States
- Media type: Print (Hardcover & paperback) + audio cassette and audio cd
- Pages: 406 pp (first edition, hardcover)
- ISBN: 0-89296-283-6 (first edition, hardcover)
- OCLC: 17768709
- Dewey Decimal: 813/.54 19
- LC Class: PS3555.L6274 B5 1988
- Preceded by: The Black Dahlia (1987)
- Followed by: L.A. Confidential (1990)

The Big Nowhere is a 1988 crime fiction novel by American author James Ellroy, the second of the L.A. Quartet, a series of novels set in 1940s and 1950s Los Angeles.

== Plot ==
The plot centers around three characters: Danny Upshaw, an L.A. deputy sheriff who investigates a string of brutal sex murders, working outside the law in his efforts to catch the killer; Turner "Buzz" Meeks, a disgraced ex-cop who now works for Howard Hughes and the gangster Mickey Cohen and begins a dangerous affair with Cohen's mistress Audrey Anders; and LAPD lieutenant Malcolm "Mal" Considine, who struggles to do the right thing in an environment of deception, paranoia and brutality. The three men gradually become part of a task force investigating communism in Hollywood. The story takes place in the aftermath of the notorious Sleepy Lagoon murder case and the resultant Zoot Suit Riots.

Over the course of the novel, Upshaw becomes increasingly obsessed with his case and begins to confront his own latent homosexuality in the process. The murders are linked to the United Alliance of Extras and Stagehands (UAES), a left-leaning labor union targeted by the task force, when an actor affiliated with the organization, Reynolds Loftis, matches the description of the suspected killer. Upshaw's investigation, however, is cut tragically short when a feud between county and city police leads to him being pegged for the killing of Gene Niles, a corrupt LAPD detective who questioned his sexuality. Fearing the outcome of this investigation, Upshaw takes his own life with the murder spree still unsolved.

Meeks and Considine pick up the investigation. Meeks does this out of a sense of responsibility–he committed the killing for which Upshaw was framed but did so in self-defense while with Audrey (Niles tried to shoot Meeks thinking he was Mickey Cohen), and his attempted coverup inadvertently led to the frameup. Ultimately, he and Considine identify the true killer: Loftis' illegitimate son Coleman Masskie, with whom he had an incestuous affair, and who was attempting to frame his father in retaliation. Masskie kills both Loftis and Considine in a climactic confrontation before being killed by Meeks. Seeking closure, Meeks tracks down a UAES-affiliated psychiatrist who was privy to Masskie's murderous inclinations. He discovers that Masskie, who briefly spoke to Upshaw as a witness early in the investigation, began stalking the deputy and developed a mutual sexual obsession with him.

The investigation also provides a fictional solution to the Sleepy Lagoon case–it's revealed that a young Masskie witnessed LAPD lieutenant Dudley Smith committing the murder, a racist hate crime in retaliation for the Latino victim sleeping with his niece. This eventually factored into Masskie's killings, as he emulated Smith's use of a "zoot stick" when mutilating his victims' corpses. Smith is never charged with the crime. However, this discovery contributes to Meeks' and Considine's disillusionment with the investigation. At the conclusion of the novel, after Cohen finds out about Meeks' affair with Anders, Meeks burns down the district attorney's house along with all of the anti-communist investigative material before leaving Los Angeles.

== Reception ==
The Big Nowhere received many positive reviews. Detroit News called the novel "a stunner....a huge, sprawling canvas of postwar Los Angeles as a black hole. It's Harry Bosch between hard covers, taking up where film noir left off as it introduces a trio of warped, cynical cops hopping aboard the Red Scare bandwagon." Gerald Petievich, author of To Live and Die in L.A., praised the book, saying, "THE BIG NOWHERE is a startling panorama of Los Angeles in the fifties. Through the eyes of some unforgettable, two-fisted cops we are taken from the Katydid Club to the Sunset Strip where the legendary crimelord Mickey Cohen buys the drinks...and the D.A. This is a compelling piece." Rave Reviews wrote, "James Ellroy's The Black Dahlia rocked the literary world last year. Now he's back with an even more powerful and compelling novel of greed, dark passion, and murder....James Ellroy has gone from one of the most impressive crime writers of the 1980s to a major literary voice of the twentieth century. THE BIG NOWHERE is a masterpiece-a powerful and disturbing novel no one should miss." While "The Big Nowhere" was praised for being engrossing and atmospheric, it was also criticized for the "unrelenting negative stereotypes" depicted in the gay and minority characters. The Big Nowhere also won Ellroy the Prix Mystère Award, in 1990.
