= Dane Whitman (politician) =

American politician

- Whitman in 2024

Member of the Vermont House of Representatives from the Bennington 2-1 district
- Incumbent
- Assumed office January 6, 2021 Serving with Timothy Corcoran II
- Preceded by: Chris Bates

Personal details
- Party: Democratic

Dane Whitman is an American politician and a member of the Democratic Party who has served in the Vermont House of Representatives since 2021.

Whitman serves on the House Committee on Human Services, Canvassing, and Opioid Settlement.
