= Bloody Christmas (1951) =

Police scandal in Los Angeles

Bloody Christmas was the severe beating of seven residents by members of the Los Angeles Police Department (LAPD) on December 25, 1951. The attacks, which left five Mexican American and two white young men with broken bones and ruptured organs, were only properly investigated after lobbying from the Mexican American community. The internal inquiry by Los Angeles Chief of Police William H. Parker resulted in eight police officers being indicted for the assaults, 54 being transferred, and 39 suspended.

The event was fictionalized in the 1990 novel L.A. Confidential by James Ellroy, which was made into a film of the same name in 1997.

== Background ==
In 1938, reforms of the LAPD were started by Mayor Frank Shaw. Throughout the 1940s, this led to the firing of corrupt officers, the raising of entrance standards, the creation of rigorous training programs, and better pay for officers.

Police autonomy was already guaranteed in Section 202 of the Los Angeles city charter since 1934. It stated that officers had a vested right to their jobs and could not be removed or disciplined without due process, which meant that authority regarding departmental discipline belonged to a board of review made up of police officers.

Despite the reforms, the LAPD was faced with a continual deterioration in relations with the Mexican American community since the 1943 Zoot Suit Riots during the Second World War. After William H. Parker was appointed chief of police in 1950, reforms continued with improving policing in Los Angeles by placing emphasis on police professionalism. Parker believed better personnel would lead to more "police autonomy," allowing the LAPD to focus on its "war-on-crime approach" to policing and for dealing with its own internal discipline. Proponents believed a professional police department should be free from political influence and control.

Despite previous police chiefs trying to improve relationships by quelling public fears of Mexican American crime, community leaders hoped Parker's appointment would really lead to an improvement in the situation. Problems occurred because of anti-Mexican sentiment among LAPD officers, many of whom believed Mexican Americans were generally delinquent and violent. That racial profiling led to numerous violent encounters between the police and Mexican Americans because each side expected the other to use force.

== Initial encounter and arrests ==
On Christmas Eve 1951, LAPD officers Julius Trojanowski and Nelson Brownson responded to a report that minors were drinking alcohol at the Showboat Bar on Riverside Drive. On arrival, they found inside seven men: Daniel Rodela, Elias Rodela, Jack Wilson, William Wilson, Raymond Marquez, Manuel Hernandez, and Eddie Nora. Even though the men had identification proving they were legally old enough to drink alcohol, the officers told them to leave. When they refused to go, the officers used force, which led to a fight starting in the parking lot. Both police officers were injured; one received a black eye, the other a cut that required stitches.

Seven hours after the fight, LAPD officers arrested all the men at their own homes. Six were taken straight to Lincoln Heights Jail. The seventh, Daniel Rodela, was dragged to a squad car by his hair and driven to the city's Elysian Park, where he was savagely beaten by several police officers. Rodela suffered multiple facial fractures; he required two blood transfusions because of the extent of his injuries.

== Prisoners beaten ==
On Christmas morning, a large number of police officers attending a departmental Christmas party were getting drunk, in violation of the LAPD's policy on alcohol. When they became aware of a rumor that Trojanowski had lost an eye in the fight at the Showboat Bar, the drunken officers decided to avenge their fellow policeman.

The six prisoners were taken from their cells in the Central City Jail and lined up. As many as 50 officers participated in a beating that lasted for 95 minutes. All the prisoners received major injuries, including punctured organs and broken facial bones. At least 100 people knew of or witnessed the beatings.

== Cover-up ==
Senior LAPD management kept the attack on the prisoners out of the mainstream news for almost three months. Media coverage ignored the beatings on Christmas Day and focused on the brawl the night before. The initial headline of the Los Angeles Times on the incident was "Officers Beaten in Bar Brawl; Seven Men Jailed". However, as Mexican Americans pushed for a focus on police brutality and more reports of violence flooded in, the media began to turn against the LAPD, running stories condemning police tactics and suggesting the amendment of Section 202 of the Los Angeles city charter.

In March 1952, six of the seven men were charged with battery and disturbing the peace. The prosecution argued that the fight started when the officers asked Jack Wilson to leave the bar peacefully. The defendants testified that the fight began when Officer Trojanowski began hitting Wilson on the head with a blackjack. Judge Joseph L. Call allowed them to describe how they were severely beaten after being arrested.

The jury found the defendants guilty of two counts of battery and one of disturbing the peace. However, after the verdict was delivered, Judge Call reprimanded the police force for its brutality, calling for an independent investigation of the assault.

== Internal investigation ==
Chief Parker's response to this criticism was defensive. The police department's "war-on-crime" policy had given it an "us versus them" mentality. Parker used the argument that the public had to support the police force to prevent anarchy and lawlessness, saying that any criticism against the LAPD damaged the police’s ability to enforce the law. He even suggested that criminals were alleging police brutality to get him fired so the L.A. underworld could re-establish its illegal activities.

However, as the internal investigation into the beatings progressed, more complaints from other incidents were reported by the media, forcing Parker to act. Eventually a 204-page internal report was compiled by the LAPD. Although it included interviews with more than 400 witnesses, many members of LAPD had tried to impede the investigation through perjury or vague testimony. The report was also contradictory because it revealed that several police officers witnessed the beatings but concluded that "none of the prisoners was physically abused in the manner alleged."

== Criminal indictments ==
The report led to grand jury hearings against the LAPD. Throughout the proceedings, the victims gave vivid accounts of their beatings, but the officers' testimonies were vague and contradictory as none could remember seeing the prisoners being beaten or remember who was taking part. Officers who had previously given detailed information to internal affairs investigators could remember very little in court.

The hearings resulted in eight officers being indicted for assault. The grand jury also issued a report that criticized the LAPD's senior officers for allowing the situation to get out of control and reminded the police department that it functioned "for the benefit of the public and not as a fraternal organization for the benefit of fellow officers."

The eight indicted officers were tried between July and November 1952. Five of them were convicted, but only one received a sentence of more than a year in prison. A further 54 officers were transferred, and 39 were temporarily suspended without pay.

== See also ==
- Blue wall of silence
- Rodney King
