= Peter Graves (announcer) =

Peter Graves (born May 16, 1952 in Bennington, Vermont) is an American television sportscaster and public address announcer specializing in Olympic, lifestyle, and action sports. He is also a former cross-country skiing coach for Harvard University.

== Early career ==
Graves was a collegiate skier at Fort Lewis College in Durango, Colorado, graduating in 1975 with a degree in physical education. He began his broadcast career as news director of KIUP Radio in Durango and a Colorado reporter for KOAT-TV in Albuquerque. He worked from 1976 to 1981 as marketing director for a Norwegian cross-country ski importer, NorTur, Inc. in Minneapolis.

His career as a stadium sports announcer began at international cross-country ski races at Telemark Resort in northern Wisconsin in 1977. He went on to become the voice of Nordic skiing at U.S. World Cup events and the international American Birkebeiner cross-country ski race from 1977 to 1985.

Graves gained notoriety as the stadium announcer for the Lumberjack World Championships in Hayward, Wisconsin, which was televised by ABC's Wide World of Sports.

== Television ==
In 1980, he was the expert commentator with ABC's Bill Flemming for cross-country skiing, and biathlon at the Winter Olympic Games in Lake Placid. He began as one of ESPN's early skiing commentators in 1981 covering international ski events with Jim Simpson. He worked as an expert commentator for ESPN's SportsCenter for the 1984 and 1988 Olympic Winter Games.

During the 1990s, he was a regular expert commentator and host for coverage of domestic and international mountain biking competition on ESPN, OLN, TSN (Canada), and EuroSport (Europe). He is a former VeloNews 'Announcer of the Year' award winner.

He was the primary television announcer for the U.S. Ski Team from 1986 to 1990.

== Mountain biking ==
Graves was one of the early stadium announcers for mountain biking beginning with the New England Mountain Bike Championships at Mount Snow, Vermont in 1988. He was one of the announcers for the first UCI World Mountain Championships in 1991 in Durango, Colorado. He has been the stadium announcer for nearly every World Mountain Bike Championship from 1991-2007.

== Olympics ==
In addition to working with ABC Sports and ESPN for the 1980, 1984 and 1988 Olympic Winter Games, he worked as a stadium announcer and producer. He worked as the stadium announcer for the 2000 Summer Olympics in Sydney for mountain biking. At the 2002 Olympics in Salt Lake City, he was an associate producer in the SLOC sport production department. He also served as the stadium announcer for the opening and closing ceremonies for both the Olympics and Paralympics in Salt Lake City, as well as stadium announcer for cross-country skiing and ski jumping.

He was the English-language announcer for all cycling events at the 2004 Summer Olympics in Athens. At the 2010 Olympic Winter Games in Vancouver, he was the host Nordic announcer calling cross country skiing and ski jumping; he followed that up by serving as PA announcer at alpine skiing, jumping and at medals plaza at Sochi 2014. 2016 Graves was among the announce team for road cycling at the Rio Olympic Games and taught announce team work shops. In February 2017, Graves traveled to Pyeongchang, Korea, to serve as lead announcer for the FIS Alpine women's World Cup, a test event prior to the 2018 Winter Olympics. In 2018, Graves served as Alpine host announcer at the 2018 Olympic Winter Games.

In 2019 Graves was part of the announcer team for the Pan American Games in Lima, Peru. In 2021, the Vermont native was an announcer for road cycling at the Tokyo Summer Olympic Games

== Recent career ==
Graves continues as an active stadium announcer at international mountain bike events and domestic World Cup ski events including the FIS Alpine Skiing World Cup at Beaver Creek, Colorado and the American Ski Classic at Vail, Colorado. He has been the finish line announcer for Grandma's Marathon in Duluth, Minnesota since 1978 and is a member of their Hall of Fame.

Graves was busy during the 2023 season again providing Nordic skiing commentary live for skiandsnowboard.live and played a large role in the FISU World Winter University Games in Lake Placid where he was the voice of the opening ceremonies as well as ski jumping. He also was host announcer for World Cup ski jumping and continued his television hosting with shows on both ESPN and NBC Sports.

In March 2023, Graves was inducted in the US Ski and Snowboard Hall of Fame.
