= Timothy Corcoran II =

American politician

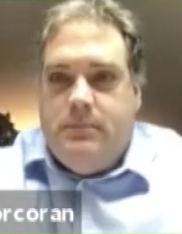

Member of the Vermont House of Representatives from the Bennington 2-1 district
- Incumbent
- Assumed office January 8, 2003 Serving with Dane Whitman (until 2005); Will Greer (since 2025)
- Preceded by: Richard Pembroke

Personal details
- Born: Timothy Robert Corcoran II; March 17, 1973 (age 53) Bennington, Vermont, U.S.
- Party: Democratic
- Spouse: Corrie Sargent
- Parent: Timothy R. Corcoran (father)
- Education: Johnson State College (BA)

Timothy Robert Corcoran II (born March 17, 1973) is an American politician. A member of the Democratic Party, he has served in the Vermont House of Representatives since being first elected in 2002.

He earned his BA in political science from Johnson State College.

His father, Timothy R. Corcoran, served in the House from 1981 to 1995 and as Bennington town clerk from 1995 to 2014.

Vermont House of Representatives
Preceded by Richard Pembroke	Vermont Representative from the Bennington 2-1 District; 2003–present Served alongside: Joseph L. Krawczyk Jr., Brian Campion, Rachael Fields	Succeeded by Incumbent
