= L.A. Confidential =

Novel by James Ellroy

- First edition cover
- Author: James Ellroy
- Cover artist: Jacket design by Paul Gamarello; Jacket illustration by Stephen Peringer
- Language: English
- Series: L.A. Quartet
- Genre: Crime fiction, noir, historical fiction
- Publisher: The Mysterious Press
- Publication date: June 1990
- Publication place: United States
- Media type: Print (hardback & paperback) and audio cassette
- Pages: 496 pp (first edition, hardcover)
- ISBN: 0-89296-293-3 (first edition, hardcover)
- OCLC: 21041119
- Dewey Decimal: 813/.54 20
- LC Class: PS3555.L6274 L18 1990
- Preceded by: The Big Nowhere (1988)
- Followed by: White Jazz (1992)

L.A. Confidential (1990) is a neo-noir novel by American writer James Ellroy, the third of his L.A. Quartet series. It is dedicated to Mary Doherty Ellroy. The epigraph is "A glory that costs everything and means nothing"—Steve Erickson.

== Plot ==
The story follows several Los Angeles Police Department officers in the 1950s who become embroiled in a mix of sex, corruption, and murder following a massacre at the Nite Owl coffee shop. The story eventually encompasses organized crime, political corruption, heroin trafficking, pornography, prostitution, and Hollywood. The title refers to the scandal magazine Confidential, which is fictionalized as Hush-Hush. It also deals with the real "Bloody Christmas" scandal.

The three protagonists are LAPD officers. Edmund Exley, the son of prestigious detective Preston Exley, is a "straight arrow" who informs on other officers in a police brutality scandal. He is first and foremost a politician and a ladder climber, trying to be more than his famous father's son. This earns the enmity of Wendell "Bud" White, an intimidating enforcer with a fixation on men who abuse women as his own mother was a victim. Between the two of them is Jack Vincennes, who acts as more of a celebrity than a cop, who is a technical advisor on a police television show called Badge of Honor (similar to the real-life show Dragnet) and provides tips to a scandal magazine. The three of them must set their differences aside to unravel the conspiracy linking the novel's events.

== Reception ==
The Chicago Tribune said, "Ellroy is a master at juggling plot lines, using a stripped, spare noir style that hits like a cleaver but is honed like a scalpel".

The Los Angeles Times gave a critical review, calling the novel "incontinent mayhem" with a plot "faster than a stray bullet and equally random."

Kirkus Reviews described LA Confidential as "energetic, sprawling, and often stylistically irritating."

The New York Times wrote that "the plotting becomes so tortuous and the narrative style so burdened by repetitive scenes of atrocious violence that the author compromises the truthfulness of his own vision."

== Adaptations ==
Character	1997 movie	2003 TV pilot	2018 TV pilot
Det. Lt. Edmund "Ed" Exley	Guy Pearce	David Conrad	Brian J. Smith
Ofc. Wendell "Bud" White	Russell Crowe	Josh Hopkins	Mark Webber
Det. Sgt. Jack Vincennes	Kevin Spacey	Kiefer Sutherland	Walton Goggins
Capt. Dudley Smith	James Cromwell	Tom Nowicki	Tony Curran
Lynn Bracken	Kim Basinger	Melissa George	Sarah Jones
Sid Hudgens	Danny DeVito	Pruitt Taylor Vince	Dominic Burgess
Pierce Patchett	David Strathairn	Eric Roberts	TBA
Det. Richard "Dick" Stensland	Graham Beckel	TBA	Shea Whigham

=== Film ===
The book was adapted for a 1997 film of the same name, directed and co-written by Curtis Hanson and starring Kevin Spacey, Russell Crowe, Guy Pearce, James Cromwell, Kim Basinger, David Strathairn and Danny DeVito. The film was universally acclaimed. It was nominated for nine Academy Awards; Basinger won both a Golden Globe and an Academy Award for Best Supporting Actress for her performance in the film, while Hanson and Brian Helgeland won the Oscar for Best Adapted Screenplay.

=== Television ===
In 2003, a television pilot of L.A. Confidential was aired. However, the pilot was not picked up as a running series. The show's main actors would have been Kiefer Sutherland, Josh Hopkins, David Conrad, Pruitt Taylor Vince, Melissa George, Tom Nowicki, and Eric Roberts. The pilot is a special feature on the two-disc DVD and the Blu-ray releases of the film.

In 2018, CBS ordered a new pilot based on the novel. The pilot would star Walton Goggins as Vincennes, Mark Webber as White, Brian J. Smith as Exley, Sarah Jones as Lynn, Alana Arenas as June, and Shea Whigham as Dick Stensland. In May 2018, it was announced that the pilot would not be moving forward.
