= Timothy R. Corcoran =

American politician (1950–2014)

Timothy Corcoran

Member of the Vermont House of Representatives
- In office January 1981 – March 1995
- Preceded by: Max Perrotta
- Succeeded by: Peter J. Brady
- Constituency: Bennington 4-3 (1981‍–‍1983); Bennington 2-3 (1983‍–‍1995)

Personal details
- Born: Timothy Robert Corcoran; June 4, 1950 Bennington, Vermont, U.S.
- Died: November 6, 2014 (aged 64) Bennington, Vermont, U.S.
- Party: Democratic
- Spouse: Linda Humphreys (m. 1970)
- Children: 3, including Timothy II
- Education: Southern Vermont College

Military service
- Branch/service: United States Army
- Battles/wars: Vietnam War

Timothy Robert Corcoran (June 4, 1950 – November 6, 2014) was an American Democratic Party politician who served from 1981 to 1995 in the Vermont House of Representatives. He resigned from the body in 1995 after being elected town clerk of Bennington, Vermont, a position he held until he died in 2014. His son, Timothy Corcoran II, has been a member of the House since 2002.

Vermont House of Representatives
Preceded by Max Perrotta	Vermont Representative from the Bennington 4-3 District; 1981–1983; Served alongside: David Shaffe	Succeeded by None
Preceded by None	Vermont Representative from the Bennington 2-3 District; 1983–1995; Served alongside: David Shaffe, John Page, J. Russell Carpenter, Mary Madkour	Succeeded by Peter J. Brady
