= Mary A. Morrissey =

American politician

Member of the Vermont House of Representatives
- Incumbent
- Assumed office January 8, 1997 Serving with Jim Carroll
- Preceded by: Mary Madkour
- Succeeded by: Tom Blakely (elect)
- Constituency: Bennington 2-3 (1997‍–‍2003); Bennington 2-2 (2003‍–‍2023); Bennington 5 (since 2023)

Personal details
- Born: Mary Ann Morrissey; March 26, 1957 (age 69) Bennington, Vermont, U.S.
- Party: Republican

Mary Ann Morrissey (born March 26, 1957) is a Republican politician who was elected and currently serves in the Vermont House of Representatives. She represents the Bennington 5 Representative District.

== 2024 harassment incident ==
For five months during 2024, Morrissey secretly poured cups of water into a tote bag owned by Democratic lawmaker Jim Carroll, who also represents Bennington and who serves with her on Vermont's House Committee on Commerce and Economic Development. Carroll suspected Morrissey to be pouring water in his bag, but had no evidence to prove the theory. He then used a hidden video camera to record footage of his bag in order to find what was happening.

On June 7, 2024, Carroll told Seven Days, an independent Vermont news publication, that he had captured footage of Morrissey pouring cups of water into his bag on two separate days. On June 11, 2024, the footage was released. Carroll has stated that Morrissey had been "nasty" to him for months and that she had "verbally harassed" him on several occasions regarding his policy decisions.

On June 17, Morrissey apologized in front of the Vermont House of Representatives. She did not state a motivation for her actions, and claimed, "I don't know why I did it. I was not meaning to hurt him ... It is something very out of character for me and I am ashamed." As a result of the incident, a formal investigation was opened by the House's ethics panel. As of June 18, 2024, Carroll has not yet decided whether to pursue charges against Morrissey.

Vermont House of Representatives
Preceded by Mary Madkour	Vermont Representative from the Bennington 2-3 District; 1997–2003; Served alongside: Peter J. Brady, Albert Krawczyk	Succeeded by None
Preceded by Betty Bolognani	Vermont Representative from the Bennington 2-2 District; 2003–present Served alongside: Albert Krawczyk, Anne Lamy Mook, Kiah Morris, Jim Carroll	Succeeded by Incumbent
