= Miles Hyman =

American illustrator and author living in France

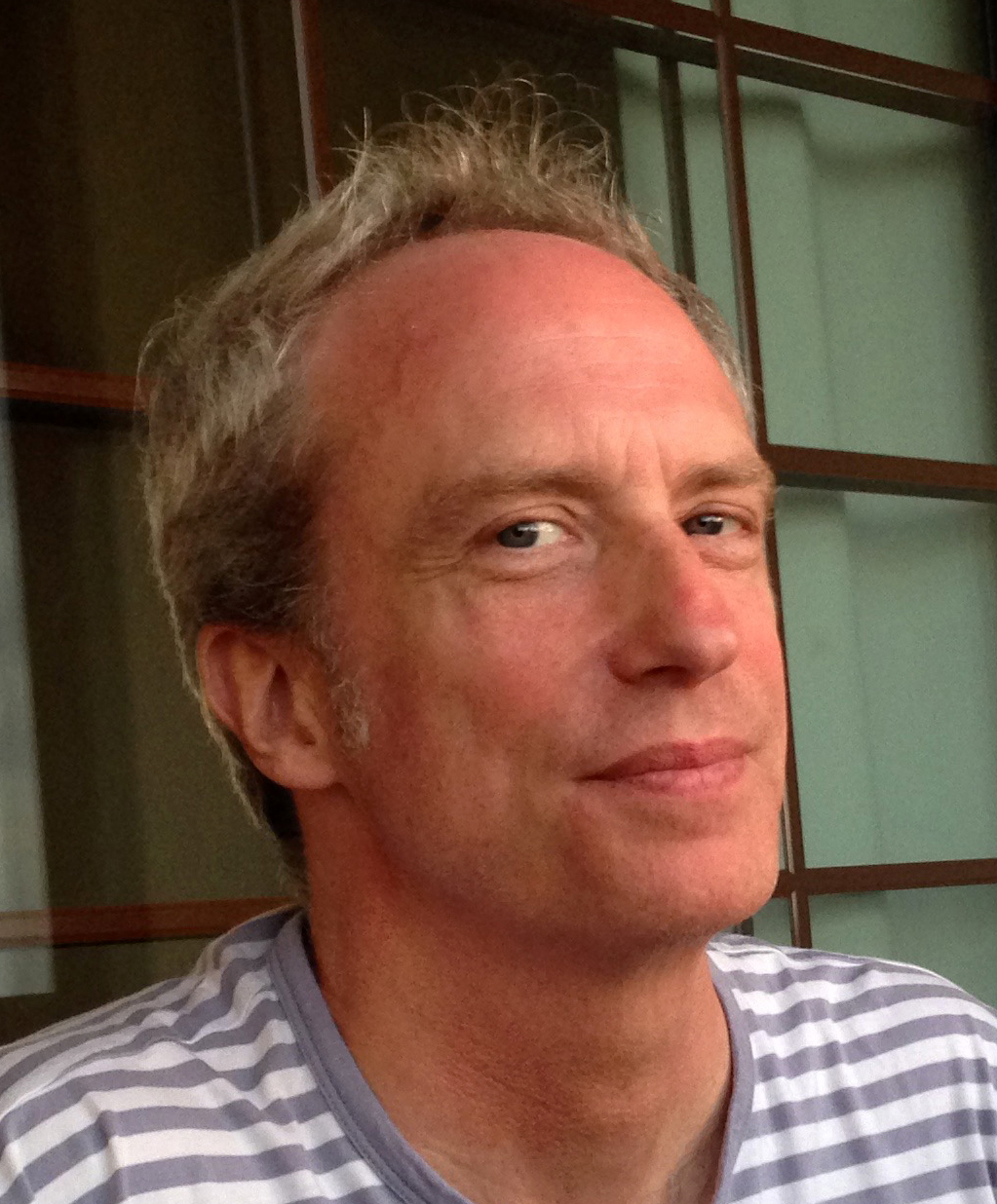
- Hyman in 2015
- Born: September 27, 1962 (age 63)
- Occupation: Illustrator
- Known for: Shirley Jackson's "The Lottery": The Authorized Graphic Adaptation

Miles Hyman (born September 27, 1962) is an author and illustrator best known for his graphic novel adaptation of Shirley Jackson's short story "The Lottery", called Shirley Jackson's "The Lottery": The Authorized Graphic Adaptation.

Hyman takes inspiration from the work of 20th century American realists and European symbolists, but also from noir movies and popular art. Much of his work is in literary adaptations. He has worked in partnerships with authors Philippe Djian, Tonino Benacquista and Marc Villard. He also adapts novels including those by John Dos Passos, Joseph Conrad and James Ellroy. He is the official designer of the covers of the Le Poulpe detective series.

In April 2017, Hyman, who moved to France in 1985 and lives outside of Paris, was appointed Knight of the Order of Arts and Letters by the French Minister of Culture, Audrey Azoulay.

Hyman is the grandson of Shirley Jackson and his adaptation of her short story won "Best Adult Graphic Novel" at Solliès Comics Festival in 2017. He has also illustrated small press editions of her book The Sundial.

== Early life ==
Hyman was born in Bennington, Vermont. He studied Literature and Fine Art at the Buxton School in Williamstown, Massachusetts, then at Wesleyan University. After moving to Paris, he studied drawing at the Paris École des Beaux-Arts.
