= Branchio-oto-renal syndrome =

Genetic disorder of the ears, kidneys, and neck

- Other names: BOR syndrome, Branchiootorenal syndrome
- Branchio-oto-renal syndrome has an autosomal dominant pattern of inheritance.
- Specialty: Medical genetics
- Symptoms: Ear abnormalities
- Causes: Mutations in genes, EYA1, SIX1, and SIX5
- Diagnostic method: Laboratory test results, Physical exam
- Treatment: Branchial fistula may need surgery

Branchio-oto-renal syndrome (BOR) is an autosomal dominant genetic disorder involving the kidneys, ears, and neck. It is also known as Melnick-Fraser syndrome.

== Signs and symptoms ==
The signs and symptoms of branchio-oto-renal syndrome are consistent with underdeveloped (hypoplastic) or absent kidneys with resultant chronic kidney disease or kidney failure. Ear anomalies include extra openings in front of the ears, called Preauricular sinuses, along with extra pieces of skin in front of the ears (preauricular tags), or further malformation or absence of the outer ear (pinna). Malformation or absence of the middle ear is also possible, individuals can have mild to profound hearing loss. People with BOR may also have cysts or fistulae along the sides of their neck. In some individuals and families, renal features are completely absent. The disease may then be termed "branchio-oto syndrome" (BO syndrome).

== Cause ==
The cause of branchio-oto-renal syndrome is mutations in genes, EYA1, SIX1, and SIX5 (approximately 40 percent of those born with this condition have a mutation in the EYA1 gene). Many different abnormalities in these genes have been identified.

== Mechanism ==
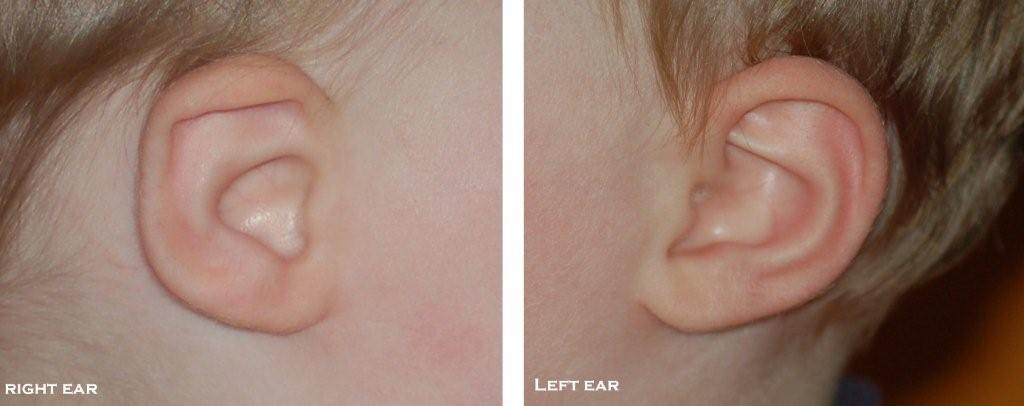
Ears of a child with branchio-oto-retal syndrome.

The genetics of branchio-oto-renal syndrome indicate it is inherited in an autosomal dominant manner with variable clinical manifestations affecting branchial, renal, and auditory development. Autosomal dominant inheritance indicates that the defective gene responsible for a disorder is located on an autosome, and only one copy of the gene is sufficient to cause the disorder, when inherited from a parent who has the disorder. The varying clinical expression of the disease between different families suggests that multiple loci may be involved. In 1992, using genetic linkage studies, the BOR gene was identified on chromosome 8, Subsequently, another locus on human chromosome 14 was identified, and several mutations were reported in genes EYA1, SIX1, and SIX5. SINX1 is involved in many facets of embryonic development and is important in the normal formation of many organs and tissues, including the ears, and kidneys before birth.

== Diagnosis ==
Diagnosis of BO syndrome or BOR syndrome is clinical, i.e. based on observing an appropriate combination of symptoms. Only about half of patients have a detectable genetic abnormality, mostly in the EYA1 gene, SIX1 gene or the SIX5 gene.

== Treatment ==
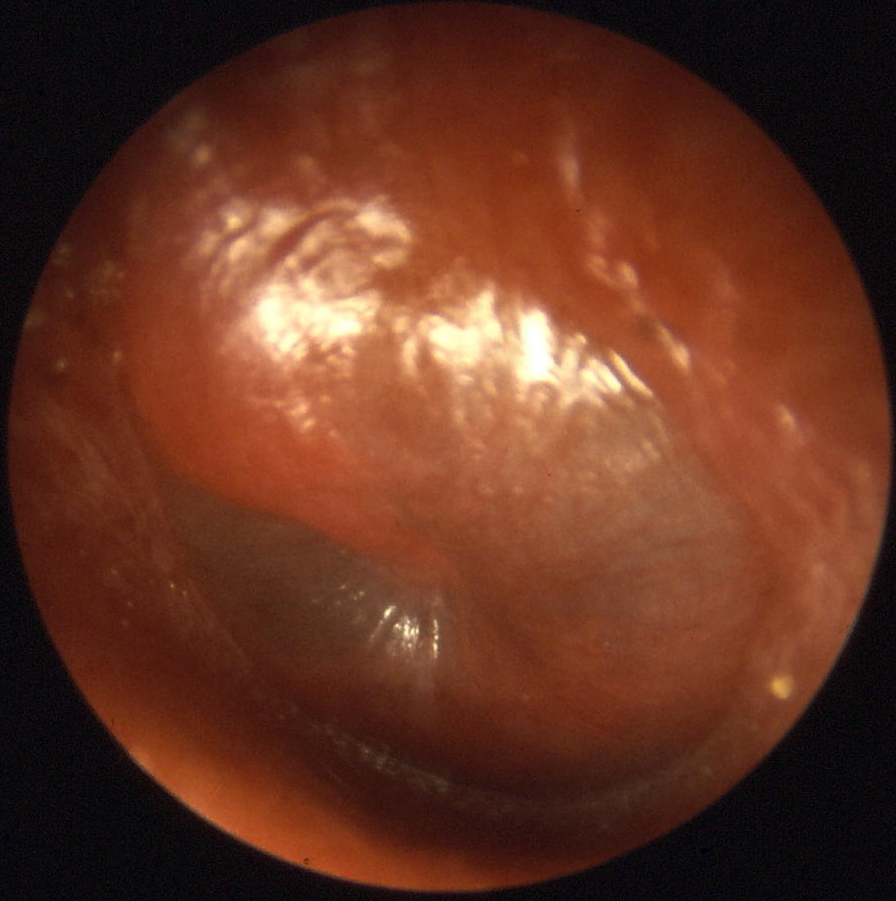
Otitis media -acute

The treatment of branchio-oto-renal syndrome is done per each affected area (or organ). For example, a person with hearing problems should have appropriate supports and prompt attention for any inflammation of the ear.A specialist should observe any kidney problems. Surgical repair may be needed depending on the degree of a defect or problem, whether a transplant or dialysis is needed.

== Epidemiology ==
The epidemiology of branchio-oto-renal syndrome has it with a prevalence of 1/40,000 in Western countries. A 2014 review found 250 such cases in the country of Japan.

== See also ==
- Lachiewicz–Sibley syndrome
- Branchio-oculo-facial syndrome
