= Colin Maitland =

English actor

- Born: 12 August 1942 (age 83); Birmingham, Warwickshire, England, UK
- Occupation: Actor
- Years active: 1960–present

Colin Maitland (born 12 August 1942) is an English actor who has made several film and television appearances. He is notable for portraying Seth Sawyer, a member of The Dirty Dozen in the 1967 film of that name.

He is married to Amanda, whom he met on a blind date, and appeared on the BBC's Bargain Hunt in November 2017. He also appeared in Lolita (1962) and The Bedford Incident (1965). His television roles include the sound/studio engineer in Shoestring (1979–80). In 2006 he recounted his experiences on The Dirty Dozen in a documentary Armed and Deadly: The Making of The Dirty Dozen.

== Filmography ==
| Year | Title | Role | Notes |
|---|---|---|---|
| 1960 | During One Night | Gunner | |
| 1962 | Lolita | Charlie Sedgewick | |
| 1963 | The Victors | | Uncredited |
| 1965 | The Bedford Incident | Seaman Jones – Bridge | |
| 1967 | The Dirty Dozen | Seth Sawyer | |
