= Tom Busby =

Canadian actor and agent (1936–2003)

- in The War Lover (1962)
- Born: 7 November 1936; Toronto, Ontario, Canada
- Died: 20 September 2003 (aged 66); Glasgow, Scotland
- Occupation: Actor

Tom Busby (7 November 1936 – 20 September 2003) was a Canadian actor and agent. Among his film credits were The War Lover (1962); The Dirty Dozen (1967) as Milo Vladek, one of the dozen; and Heavenly Pursuits (1986).

== Biography ==
Busby was born in Toronto, Ontario, Canada. He was responsible for training Glasgow youngsters at Community Service Volunteers (CSV). Among his many pupils were Billy Boyd, actor (The Lord of the Rings), and Cameron McKenna, voice-over artist (BBC and STV announcer). Busby also directed comedian Chic Murray in another version of A Christmas Carol shown in 1992 on the BBC.

The novelist Siân Busby was his daughter, and he was the father-in-law of journalist Robert Peston.

He died on 20 September 2003, at his home in Glasgow, Scotland; he was 66 years old. The cause of death was a heart attack.

== Filmography ==
Year	Title	Role	Notes
1960	During One Night	Sam	
1960	Never Take Sweets from a Stranger	2nd Policeman	
1962	The War Lover	Farr: Crew of 'The Body'	
1963	The Victor	'The Squad' Member #4	
1967	The Dirty Dozen	Milo Vladek	
1986	Heavenly Pursuits	Monseigneur Brusse	(final film role)
