= The Dirty Dozen =

1967 film

- Theatrical release poster by Frank McCarthy
- Directed by: Robert Aldrich
- Screenplay by: Nunnally Johnson; Lukas Heller
- Based on: The Dirty Dozen by E. M. Nathanson
- Produced by: Kenneth Hyman
- Starring: Lee Marvin; Ernest Borgnine; Charles Bronson; Jim Brown; John Cassavetes; Richard Jaeckel; George Kennedy; Trini Lopez; Ralph Meeker; Robert Ryan; Telly Savalas; Clint Walker; Robert Webber
- Cinematography: Edward Scaife
- Edited by: Michael Luciano
- Music by: Frank De Vol
- Production company: Kenneth Hyman Production
- Distributed by: Metro-Goldwyn-Mayer
- Release date: June 15, 1967
- Running time: 150 minutes
- Countries: United States; United Kingdom
- Languages: English; German; French
- Budget: $5.4 million
- Box office: $45.3 million

The Dirty Dozen is a 1967 war film directed by Robert Aldrich and starring Lee Marvin, with an ensemble supporting cast including Ernest Borgnine, Charles Bronson, Jim Brown, John Cassavetes, Richard Jaeckel, George Kennedy, Trini Lopez, Ralph Meeker, Robert Ryan, Telly Savalas, Clint Walker and Robert Webber. Set in 1944 during World War II, the film follows a penal military unit of twelve convicts as they are trained as commandos by the Allies for a suicide mission ahead of the Normandy landings.

The screenplay is based on the 1965 novel by E. M. Nathanson, which in turn was inspired by a real-life World War II unit of behind-the-lines demolition specialists from the 101st Airborne Division named the "Filthy Thirteen". Filming took place at the MGM British Studios.

The Dirty Dozen was released on June 15, 1967 by Metro-Goldwyn-Mayer, and was a box office success, grossing $45 million against a $5 million budget. It won the Academy Award for Best Sound Editing at the 40th Academy Awards. In 2001, the American Film Institute placed it at number 65 on their 100 Years... 100 Thrills list. The film spawned several television film sequels. A remake was announced in 2019 by Warner Bros.

== Plot ==
In March 1944, OSS officer Major John Reisman is ordered by the commander of ADSEC in Britain, Major General Sam Worden, to undertake "Project Amnesty", a top secret mission to turn a dozen of the United States Army's worst convicts into highly skilled commandos to eliminate Wehrmacht officers at a château near Rennes, disrupting the German chain of command in northern France ahead of D-Day. Any convicts who survive the mission will receive a (temporary) amnesty.

Reisman meets the twelve convicts (including mob-associated robber Franko, former major Wladislaw, black soldier Jefferson, gentle giant and hazing-damaged Posey, and religious zealot and psychopath Maggott) at a military prison operated by the Military Police Corps. These five are condemned to death for murder, while the others (Gilpin, Pinkley, Sawyer, Lever, Bravos, Vladek, and Jimenez) face lengthy sentences, including hard labor for crimes such as assault, larceny, mugging, and impersonation. Reisman quickly establishes his authority, but the group remains disgruntled, often instigated by a defiant Franko. Overseen by MPs led by Sergeant Bowren, the convicts gradually learn to operate together when they are forced to build their own training camp. However, an act of insubordination by Franko, who convinces the team to refuse to shower in cold water, results in the men's shaving and wash kits being withheld as punishment, leading the group to be nicknamed the "Dirty Dozen." Reisman is privately pleased at the insurrection, the first indication that the erstwhile collection of individualists is bonding as a team. The convicts are psychoanalyzed by Captain Kinder, who warns Reisman there is a chance that at least seven of them will kill him if given the chance and that Maggott is by far the most dangerous.

The Dirty Dozen are sent for parachute training at a facility commanded by Reisman's nemesis, Colonel Everett Dasher Breed of the 101st Airborne Division. Breed is unaware of Project Amnesty and attempts to discover Reisman's mission, including infiltration of the Dirty Dozen's camp. With the eager assistance of the convicts, Reisman kicks Breed and his men out of the camp. Later, Breed's testimony, combined with Reisman's rewarding the Dirty Dozen with the services of prostitutes for completing their training, prompts the staff to consider terminating the project. Reisman's friend and liaison, Major Armbruster, suggests a test of the convicts' training: have them operate against Breed's men in large scale maneuvers. Using brazen subterfuge, the Dirty Dozen commandeers a Red Cross ambulance; posing as a team of medics delivering a wounded soldier, they infiltrate the opposition’s headquarters, capturing its command at gunpoint. Impressed at the cohesiveness of the audacious tactics, Worden allows Reisman to resume his mission.

The Dozen parachutes into northern France. Wladislaw and Reisman infiltrate the chateau disguised as German officers and lower ropes for the rest of the team. Maggott murders an officer's consort in her room and opens fire at his teammates before being killed by Jefferson. The gunfire reveals the Dozen's presence too early, alerting the German officers, who retreat to safety in an underground bomb shelter with their guests. Reisman orders gasoline poured through the ventilation shafts, and Jefferson ignites it with hand grenades before being killed by a sniper. The chateau explodes, killing the occupants, while the surviving Americans engage in a firefight with chateau guards and arriving reinforcements. Reisman, Bowren and Wladislaw are the only ones to escape back to England alive. Worden pardons Wladislaw, who is given an opportunity to resume his service in the armed forces.

In a voiceover, Armbruster tells the next of kin of the rest of the Dozen that "they lost their lives in the line of duty".

== Cast ==
- Lee Marvin as Major John Reisman
- Ernest Borgnine as Major General Sam Worden
- Richard Jaeckel as Sergeant Clyde Bowren
- George Kennedy as Major Max Armbruster
- Ralph Meeker as Captain Stuart Kinder
- Robert Ryan as Colonel Everett Dasher Breed
- Robert Webber as Brigadier General Denton
- Robert Phillips as Corporal Carl Morgan
- George Roubicek as Private Arthur James Gardner
- Joe Cornelius as US officer

'The Dozen'

- Clint Walker as Samson Posey (#1)
- Donald Sutherland as Vernon L. Pinkley (#2)
- Jim Brown as Robert T. Jefferson (#3)
- Ben Carruthers as Glenn Gilpin (#4)
- Stuart Cooper as Roscoe Lever (#5)
- Tom Busby as Milo Vladek (#6)
- Colin Maitland as Seth K. Sawyer (#7)
- Telly Savalas as Archer J. Maggott (#8)
- Charles Bronson as Joseph Wladislaw (#9)
- Trini López as Pedro Jimenez (#10)
- John Cassavetes as Victor R. Franko (#11)
- Al Mancini as Tassos R. Bravos (#12)

Uncredited

- Ken Wayne as Master Sergeant Fredericks
- Richard Marner as German sentry
- John Hollis as German porter at château
- Ann Lancaster as prostitute

== Historical basis ==
Nathanson states in the prologue to his novel The Dirty Dozen that, while he heard a legend that such a unit may have existed, he incorrectly heard that they were convicts. He was unable to find any corroboration in the archives of the US Army in Europe. He instead turned his research of convicted felons into the subsequent novel. He does not state where he acquired the name, but Arch Whitehouse coined the name "Dirty Dozen" as the 12 enlisted men of the airborne section that became the "Filthy Thirteen" after the lieutenant joined their ranks. In Arch Whitehouse's article in True Magazine, he claimed that all the enlisted men were full-blood Indians, but, in reality, only their leader Jake McNeice was one-quarter Choctaw. The parts of the Filthy Thirteen story that carried over into Nathanson's book were not bathing until the jump into Normandy, their disrespect for military authority, and the pre-invasion party. The Filthy Thirteen was actually a demolitions section with the 101st Airborne, and had a mission to secure bridges over the Douve on D-Day.

Barbara Maloney, the daughter of John Agnew, a private in the Filthy Thirteen, told the American Valor Quarterly that her father felt that 30 percent of the film's content was historically correct, including a scene where officers are captured. Unlike the Dirty Dozen, the Filthy Thirteen were not convicts; however, they were men prone to drinking and fighting and often spent time in the stockade.

== Production ==
=== Writing ===
Although Robert Aldrich had failed to buy the rights to E. M. Nathanson's novel The Dirty Dozen while it was just an outline, Metro-Goldwyn-Mayer succeeded in May 1963. On publication, the novel became a best-seller in 1965. It was adapted to the screen by veteran scriptwriter and producer Nunnally Johnson, and Lukas Heller. A repeated rhyme was written into the script where the twelve actors verbally recite the details of the attack in a rhyming chant to help them remember their roles while approaching the mission target:

1. Down to the road block, we've just begun.
2. The guards are through.
3. The Major's men are on a spree.
4. Major and Wladislaw go through the door.
5. Pinkley stays out in the drive.
6. The Major gives the rope a fix.
7. Wladislaw throws the hook to heaven.
8. Jiminez has got a date.
9. The other guys go up the line.
10. Sawyer and Gilpin are in the pen.
11. Posey guards Points Five and Seven.
12. Wladislaw and the Major go down to delve.
13. Franko goes up without being seen.
14. Zero Hour: Jiminez cuts the cable; Franko cuts the phone.
15. Franko goes in where the others have been.
16. We all come out like it's Halloween.

=== Casting ===
The cast included many American World War II veterans including Lee Marvin, Robert Webber and Robert Ryan (U.S. Marine Corps); Telly Savalas and George Kennedy (U.S. Army); Charles Bronson (U.S. Army Air Forces); Ernest Borgnine (U.S. Navy); and Richard Jaeckel and Clint Walker (U.S. Merchant Marine).

John Wayne was the original choice for Reisman, but he turned down the role because he objected to the adultery present in the original script, which featured the character having a relationship with an Englishwoman whose husband was fighting on the Continent. Jack Palance refused the "Archer Maggot" role when they would not rewrite the script to make his character lose his racism; Telly Savalas took the role instead.

Six of the dozen were experienced American stars, while the "Back Six" were actors resident in the UK: Englishman Colin Maitland, Canadians Donald Sutherland and Tom Busby, and Americans Stuart Cooper, Al Mancini, and Ben Carruthers. According to commentary on The Dirty Dozen: 2-Disc Special Edition, when Trini Lopez left the film early, the death scene of Lopez's character where he blew himself up with the radio tower was given to Busby (in the film, Ben Carruthers' character Glenn Gilpin is given the task of blowing up the radio tower while Busby's character Milo Vladek is shot in front of the château). Lopez's character dies off-camera during the parachute drop that begins the mission. The scene involving the impersonation of a general was to have been done by Clint Walker, but when he stated that he thought the scene was demeaning to his character, who was a Native American, Aldrich picked out Sutherland for the scene.

Jim Brown, the Cleveland Browns running back, announced his retirement from American football at age thirty during the making of the film. The owner of the Browns, Art Modell, demanded Brown choose between football and acting. With Brown's considerable accomplishments in the sport (he was already the NFL's all-time leading rusher, was well ahead statistically of the second-leading rusher, and his team had won the 1964 NFL Championship), he chose acting. In Spike Lee's 2002 documentary Jim Brown: All-American Modell admitted he made a huge mistake in forcing Jim Brown to choose between football and Hollywood. He said that if he had it to do over again, he would never have made such a demand. Modell fined Jim Brown the equivalent of over $100 per day, a fine which Brown said that "today wouldn't even buy the doughnuts for a team".

=== Filming ===
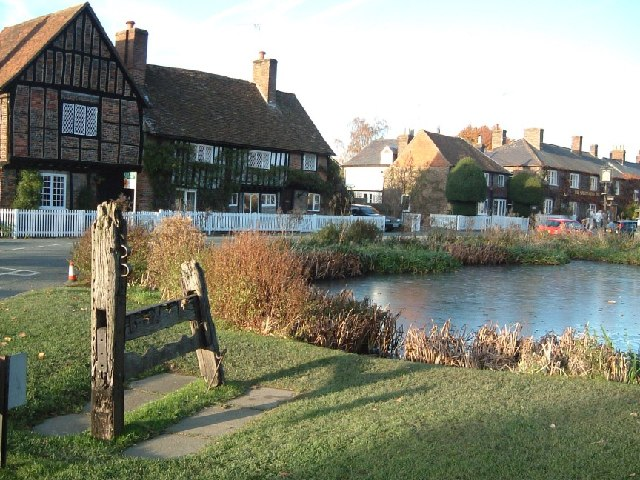
Aldbury – scene of the wargame

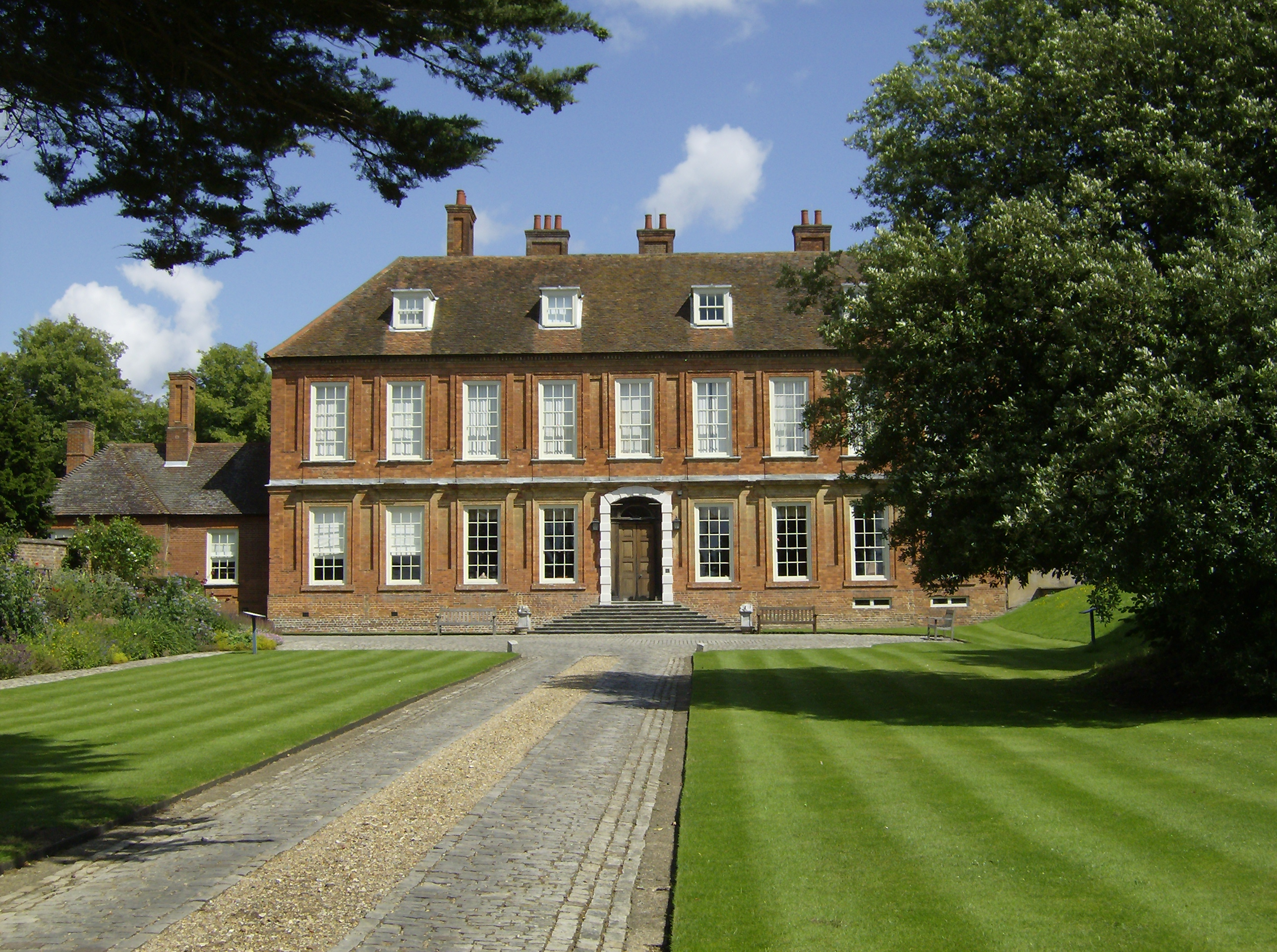
Bradenham Manor – Wargames HQ

The production was filmed in the United Kingdom during the summer of 1966. Interiors and set pieces took place at MGM-British Studios, Borehamwood, where the château set was built under the direction of art director William Hutchinson. It was 720 yards (660 m) wide and 50 feet (15 m) high, surrounded with 5,400 square yards (4,500 m^{2}) of heather, 400 ferns, 450 shrubs, 30 spruce trees and six weeping willows. Construction of the faux château proved problematic. The script required its explosion, but it was so solid that 70 tons of explosives would have been required for the effect. Instead, a cork and plastic section was destroyed.

Exteriors were shot throughout southeast England. The credit scenes at the American military prison – alluded in the movie to be Shepton Mallett – were shot in a courtyard at Ashridge House in Hertfordshire. Co-star Richard Jaeckel recalled that when the introductory lineup scene was first shot, Aldrich, who liked to play pranks on his actors, initially placed 5 ft 8 in (1.73 m) Charles Bronson between 6 ft 6 in (1.98 m) Clint Walker and 6 ft 4 in (1.93 m) Donald Sutherland, which provoked an angry response from Bronson, making Aldrich laugh.

The jump school scene was shot at the former entrance to RAF Hendon in London. The wargame was filmed in and around the village of Aldbury. Bradenham Manor was the Wargames' Headquarters. Beechwood Park School in Markyate was also used as a location during the school's summer term, where the training camp and tower were built and shot in the grounds and the village itself as parts of "Devonshire". The main house was also used, appearing in the film as a military hospital. After filming finished, the training camp huts were relocated and used as sports equipment storage for the school's playing fields. Residents of Chenies, Buckinghamshire complained to MGM when filming caused damage around their village.

While making the film, some of the cast members granted an interview to ABC Film review in which they contrasted their own real wartime ranks to their officer roles in the film:

George Kennedy: Took me two years to make Private First Class.
Lee Marvin: I didn't even make that in the Marines.
Ernest Borgnine: I was beneath notice in the Navy
For punks, we're doing all right, said Marvin. I wonder how the generals are doing?

Heavy rains throughout the summer caused filming delays of several months, leading to $1 million in overruns and bringing the final cost to $5 million. In the early hours of 21 September 1966 part of the Chateau set burned down prematurely. Night-time film had been stopped at 03:30 due to fog, and the set – which was due to be destroyed during filming – caught fire at 06:29. Principal photography wrapped at MGM-British Studios in September 1966 with post-production to be completed at MGM studios in Culver City, California.

== Release ==
=== Theatrical ===
The Dirty Dozen premiered at the Capitol Theatre in New York City on June 15, 1967 and opened at the 34th Street East theatre the following day. Despite being shot in an aspect ratio of 1.85:1, the film was initially shown in 70 mm which cut off 15% of the film and resulted in a grainy look.

== Reception ==
=== Box office ===
The Dirty Dozen was a massive commercial success. In its first five days in New York, the film grossed $103,849 from 2 theatres. Produced on a budget of $5.4 million, it earned theatrical rentals of $7.5 million in its first five weeks from 1,152 bookings and 625 prints, one of the fastest-grossing films at the time; however, on Variety's weekly box office survey, based on a sample of key city theatres, it only reached number two at the U.S. box office behind You Only Live Twice until it finally reached number one in its sixth week. It eventually earned rentals of $24.2 million in the United States and Canada from a gross of $45.3 million. It was the fourth-highest-grossing film of 1967 and MGM's highest-grossing film of the year. It was also a hit in France, with admissions of 4,672,628.

=== Critical response ===
Upon release, the film received positive reviews from critics. It holds an 82% rating on Rotten Tomatoes based on 55 reviews, with an average rating of 8.00/10. The critical consensus reads, "Amoral on the surface and exuding testosterone, The Dirty Dozen utilizes combat and its staggering cast of likable scoundrels to deliver raucous entertainment." On release, the film was criticized for its level of violence. Roger Ebert, who was in his first year as a film reviewer for the Chicago Sun-Times, wrote sarcastically,

I'm glad the Chicago Police Censor Board forgot about that part of the local censorship law where it says films shall not depict the burning of the human body. If you have to censor, stick to censoring sex, I say... but leave in the mutilation, leave in the sadism and by all means leave in the human beings burning to death. It's not obscene as long as they burn to death with their clothes on.

In another contemporaneous review, Bosley Crowther called it "an astonishingly wanton war film" and a "studied indulgence of sadism that is morbid and disgusting beyond words"; he also noted,

It is not simply that this violent picture of an American military venture is based on a fictional supposition that is silly and irresponsible. ... But to have this bunch of felons a totally incorrigible lot, some of them psychopathic, and to try to make us believe that they would be committed by any American general to carry out an exceedingly important raid that a regular commando group could do with equal efficiency—and certainly with greater dependability—is downright preposterous.

Crowther called some of the portrayals "bizarre and bold":

Marvin's taut, pugnacious playing of the major ... is tough and terrifying. John Cassavetes is wormy and noxious as a psychopath condemned to death, and Telly Savalas is swinish and maniacal as a religious fanatic and sex degenerate. Charles Bronson as an alienated murderer, Richard Jaeckel as a hard-boiled military policeman, and Jim Brown as a white-hating Negro stand out in the animalistic group.

Art Murphy of Variety was more positive, calling it "an exciting World War II pre-D-Day drama" with an "excellent cast" and a "very good screenplay" with "a ring of authenticity to it".

The Time Out Film Guide notes that over the years, "The Dirty Dozen has taken its place alongside that other commercial classic, The Magnificent Seven". The review then states,

The violence which liberal critics found so offensive has survived intact. Aldrich sets up dispensable characters with no past and no future, as Marvin reprieves a bunch of death row prisoners, forges them into a tough fighting unit, and leads them on a suicide mission into Nazi France. Apart from the values of team spirit, cudgeled by Marvin into his dropout group, Aldrich appears to be against everything: anti-military, anti-Establishment, anti-women, anti-religion, anti-culture, anti-life. Overriding such nihilism is the super-crudity of Aldrich's energy and his humour, sufficiently cynical to suggest that the whole thing is a game anyway, a spectacle that demands an audience.

=== Accolades ===
Award	Category	Nominee(s)	Result
Academy Awards	Best Supporting Actor	John Cassavetes	Nominated
Academy Awards	Best Film Editing	Michael Luciano	Nominated
Academy Awards	Best Sound	Metro-Goldwyn-Mayer Studio Sound Department	Nominated
Academy Awards	Best Sound Effects	John Poyner	Won
American Cinema Editors Awards	Best Edited Feature Film	Michael Luciano	Won
Directors Guild of America Awards	Outstanding Directorial Achievement in Motion Pictures	Robert Aldrich	Nominated
Golden Globe Awards	Best Supporting Actor – Motion Picture	John Cassavetes	Nominated
Laurel Awards	Top Action-Drama		Nominated
Laurel Awards	Top Action Performance	Lee Marvin	Won
Laurel Awards	Top Male Supporting Performance	Jim Brown	Nominated
Laurel Awards	Top Male Supporting Performance	John Cassavetes	Nominated
Photoplay Awards	Gold Medal		Won

=== Year-end lists ===
Also, the film is recognized by American Film Institute in these lists:

- 2001: AFI's 100 Years...100 Thrills – No. 65

== Other media ==
A similar storyline, involving Army volunteers from the guardhouse, in a mission (to seize two assimilated girls) from the Kiowa, ran in S01E10, "West of the River" (10/3/1956) in the TV series "Cheyenne", which starred Clint Walker, who played Samson Posey.

=== Parody, unofficial sequels and remake ===
In 1967, the same year that The Dirty Dozen was released, a parody film titled The Pogi Dozen (lit. 'The Handsome Dozen') was released in the Philippines, starring the comedian Chiquito.

Three years after The Dirty Dozen was released, Too Late the Hero, a film also directed by Aldrich, was described as a "kind of sequel to The Dirty Dozen". The 1969 Michael Caine film Play Dirty follows a similar theme of convicts recruited as soldiers. The 1977 Italian war film directed by Enzo G. Castellari, The Inglorious Bastards, is a loose remake of The Dirty Dozen. Quentin Tarantino's 2009 Inglourious Basterds was derived from the English-language title of the Castellari film.

=== Comic books ===
Dell Comics published a comic The Dirty Dozen in October 1967.

In 1972 Marvel Comics launched Combat Kelly and the Deadly Dozen inspired by the movie. While the series began as a spinoff from Marvel's more popular Sgt. Fury and his Howling Commandos and several characters from that series crossed over, Combat Kelly (as it was known in the indicia) only lasted nine issues.

DC Comics in the 1980s revived their Silver Age comic team known as the Suicide Squad with a similar premise, only using supervillains instead of military convicts. The success of this incarnation over the following years saw incarnations of the team appear in various media, including television and movies – both live-action and animation – as well as video games.

=== Sequels ===
A few television films were produced in the mid-to-late 1980s to capitalize on the popularity of the first film. Lee Marvin, Richard Jaeckel and Ernest Borgnine reprised their roles for The Dirty Dozen: Next Mission in 1985, leading a group of military convicts in a mission to kill a German general who was plotting to assassinate Adolf Hitler. In The Dirty Dozen: The Deadly Mission (1987), Telly Savalas, who had played the role of the psychotic Maggot in the original film, assumed the different role of Major Wright, an officer who leads a group of military convicts to extract a group of German scientists who are being forced to make a deadly nerve gas. Ernest Borgnine again reprised his role of General Worden. The Dirty Dozen: The Fatal Mission (1988) depicts Savalas's Wright character and a group of renegade soldiers attempting to prevent a group of extreme German generals from starting a Fourth Reich, with Erik Estrada co-starring and Ernest Borgnine again playing the role of General Worden. In 1988, Fox aired a short-lived television series starring Ben Murphy. Among the cast was John Slattery, who played Private Leeds in eight of the show's 11 episodes.

=== Toys ===
Some of the surviving cast members of the original film provided the voices of the toy soldiers in Joe Dante's Small Soldiers.

=== In popular culture ===
In 2014, Warner Bros. announced that director David Ayer would be the director of a live-action adaptation of the DC Comics property Suicide Squad, and Ayer has gone on to say that the film is "the Dirty Dozen with super villains", citing the original film as inspiration.

Detroit-based hip-hop group D12, also known as the Dirty Dozen, took its name from the movie, which they had not seen, and mistakenly thought it was a Western movie.

=== Remake ===
In December 2019 Warner Bros. announced it was developing a remake with David Ayer set to direct.

== See also ==
- List of American films of 1967
- Do Aankhen Barah Haath, a 1957 Indian film with a similar plot
- My Six Convicts (autobiographical story of Donald Powell Wilson)
- Silmido, a 2003 Korean film about the true story of train convicts as black ops assassins in order to kill North Korean leader Kim Il Sung
