= George Roubicek =

Austrian actor

- Born: George Karl Roubicek; 25 May 1935 (age 91); Vienna, Austria
- Occupations: Actor, dialogue director, and script adapter
- Years active: 1957-2002
- Known for: The Tomb of the Cybermen; The Bedford Incident; The Dirty Dozen; Star Wars
- Spouse: Mary Eberts (m. 1959)

George Karl Roubicek (born 25 May 1935) is an Austrian actor, and a dialogue director and script adaptor for English-language versions of foreign films and television shows. Born in Austria, Roubicek appeared in a number of small roles throughout the 1950s, '60s and '70s, including the films The Bedford Incident, Billion Dollar Brain and The Dirty Dozen. In 1967, he appeared in The Tomb of the Cybermen, a four-part Doctor Who serial. He played the part of Semenkin in The Champions (Reply Box No.666 episode, 1967). Roubicek had a small role in A New Hope, the first Star Wars film, as the Imperial Commander Praji. He also appeared in two James Bond films, You Only Live Twice and The Spy Who Loved Me.

Although he continued acting in small roles during his later years, his later career was more focused on dubbing foreign films and television shows into English-language versions. He directed the dubbing of 13 previously unaired episodes of the cult Japanese series Monkey, a show he previously performed voice-acting for in the late 1970s. In 2008, he adapted the French animated film Azur & Asmar: The Princes' Quest to an English-language version.

== Early career ==
George Roubicek's West End debut came in Tea and Sympathy, Comedy Theatre, London in 1957. In the role of Al, he played opposite Elizabeth Sellars, Hy Hazell and two other actors making their debuts, Tim Seely and Keith Baxter. In 1958, he appeared in the original cast of the Agatha Christie play Verdict, where he played the role of Lester Cole, the student of a professor who has fled from prosecution in his home country. The play was first staged at the Strand Theatre in London on 22 May 1958. Roubicek's first film roles were bit parts in the late 1950s, including as a German prisoner in the 1957 British World War II film The One That Got Away, and a police constable in the 1959 murder mystery Blind Date. Roubicek continued performing in small roles in a number of films in the early 1960s. Among them were a cleaning service man in the 1962 British horror film Night of the Eagle, a Russian sentry in the 1963 British war film The Victors, and the character Lieutenant Berger in the 1965 American Cold War film The Bedford Incident. In 1967, he played Private Arthur James Gardner in The Dirty Dozen, an American war film and, to that point, by far his most impressive film credit, although his character is hanged only a few minutes into the film. That year, he also appeared in the British espionage film Billion Dollar Brain, where he played the small part of Edgar.

Roubicek also appeared in The Tomb of the Cybermen, a four-part Doctor Who serial broadcast in September 1967. He portrayed Captain Hopper, the commander of a rocket that brought an archaeological expedition to the planet Telos to study the Cybermen, a race of cyborgs. Andrew Cartmel, a science-fiction writer who served as a Doctor Who script editor in 1986–1989, strongly criticized Hopper's dialogue in his book, Through Time: An Unauthorised and Unofficial History of Doctor Who. Hopper, who is supposed to be an American, frequently uses the word "guy" and what Cartmel called "odd fake American idioms" like, "It's not exactly peaches." Although Cartmel did not address Roubicek's performance, he said the dialogue was written "in a way that suggests the English writers have never travelled across the Atlantic and have paid precious little attention to the films or books that have flowed the other way".

In 1976, Roubicek was cast in Star Wars, where he played the small role of Praji, a commander with the Galactic Empire. He appeared early in the film, speaking with Darth Vader after the Imperial forces have seized the Rebel Alliance starship Tantive IV and captured Princess Leia. Roubicek's scene was filmed over a three-day sequence in July 1976, near the final days of principal photography. Roubicek did not anticipate at the time that Star Wars would become such a cultural phenomenon, and his first impression of the franchise was "What is this all about"? During a 2007 interview, Roubicek said, "I don't think anyone knew [what Star Wars was], except maybe George Lucas, and I'm not sure he knew all the time! We certainly didn't know. I wouldn't say this was just another job – there's no such thing as just another job – but I didn't realize how special it was going to be at the time."

Roubicek appeared in two separate episodes of the spy-fi television series, The Avengers, playing different characters both times. In "The White Dwarf", an episode broadcast on 9 February 1963, he played Luke Richter, the son of a prominent astronomer who was murdered shortly after discovering a star was going to collide with and destroy the Earth. Roubicek also appeared in "Invasion of the Earthmen", which was first broadcast on 15 January 1969. In that episode he played Bernard Grant, a secret agent who is killed by a giant Boa constrictor while investigating a mysterious school called the Alpha Academy. In the late 1970s, Roubicek did some work on the English language dubbing of Monkey, a cult Japanese action/fantasy television series that ran from 1978 to 1980. He performed a few of the voice acting parts for the series and had a minor role in the technical dubbing aspects.

== Later career ==
Roubicek continued some acting in his later years, including a small role in The Infiltrator, a 1995 film about a Jewish freelance journalist who travels to Germany for a story about Neo-Nazism. However, most of his later career focused on the script adaptation and dubbing of foreign films into English-language versions. In 1996, Roubicek handled the English script adaptation of the 1991 comedy science-fiction film Roujin Z. The Japanese anime film by Katsuhiro Otomo focuses on an elderly invalid man and a futuristic computerized hospital bed which takes on a life of its own.

In 2000, Roubicek went on to voice several characters in the English version of the Croatian children's animated series Lapitch the Little Shoemaker as well directing the voices with Sean Barrett who also voices Lapitch's shoemaker Melchoir.

In 2002, Roubicek doubled as casting and voice director for the English version of the CGI animated series Spheriks.

In 2004, Roubicek was asked to work again on Monkey, where he did some peripheral dubbing work in the late 1970s. He was hired as the director of the English-language dubbing for 13 previously televised episodes of Monkey, which were released on DVD that year. The episodes had been included as a bonus feature on past DVD releases, but were only subtitled and had never before been dubbed into English. Roubicek was tasked with adapting the original Japanese scripts into English and directing the original cast in the dialogue for the dubbing. Roubicek said both he and the cast enjoyed being brought back together for the project. However, he said it was also particularly challenging. The recording sessions require what he calls a "horrendous" amount of concentration, but the script adaptation process proved even more difficult. Roubicek had to ensure the translation was not only accurate, but preserved the humour of the original Japanese scripts. Fabulous Films Ltd., the company handling the DVD releases, originally provided Roubicek only with transcripts of the English subtitles for the 13 episodes, but Roubicek disregarded them and had to start writing from scratch because, he claimed, subtitle transcripts "never, ever bear any relation to a dubbing script".

In 2008, Roubicek worked with filmmaker Michel Ocelot to adapt an English-language version of Ocelot's 2006 animated fantasy film, Azur & Asmar: The Princes' Quest. which boasts what The New York Times described as a "flat, storybook style worlds away from the sculpture digital aesthetic pioneered by Pixar", tells a fable-like tale of two young boys in a mythic Middle Eastern setting. The original film's dialogue was in French with small portions in Arabic. During the adaptation, Roubicek and Ocelot chose to translate the French dialogue into English, but preserve the Arabic without dubbing or subtitles. Michael Phillips, film critic with the Chicago Tribune, said this was the correct decision because it allows the viewers to share the same "momentary confusion" as characters who do not understand Arabic and are suddenly thrown into "disorienting surroundings".

== Filmography ==
Year	Title	Role	Notes
1957	The One That Got Away	German Prisoner	
1959	Blind Date	Police constable	
1960	Sink the Bismarck!	Hoffman, Sailor on Bismarck	Uncredited
1963	The Mouse on the Moon	Aide	Uncredited
1963	The Victors	Russian Sentry	
1965	The Bedford Incident	Lieutenant Berger U.S.N – C.I.C	
1965	The Heroes of Telemark	Soldier Operating Radio Direction Finder	Uncredited
1967	You Only Live Twice	American Astronaut	
1967	The Dirty Dozen	Pvt. Arthur James Gardner	
1967	Billion Dollar Brain	Edgar	
1967	Doctor Who	Captain Hopper	Serial The Tomb of the Cybermen
1968	Submarine X-1	Redmayne's Flag Officer	Uncredited
1969	Battle of Britain	Sergeant Pilot – Falke's Crew	Uncredited
1969	The Adding Machine	Graveyard Lover	(scenes deleted)
1970	Foreign Exchange	Karkov	TV movie
1970	The Games	Mark	Uncredited
1971	Murphy's War	U-Boat Crewman	Uncredited
1971	Dad's Army	German Radio Operator	
1977	Star Wars	Cmdr. Praji	Uncredited
1977	The Spy Who Loved Me	Stromberg One captain	
1979	Winterspelt	Captain John Kimbrough	
1980	Bad Timing	Policeman No. 1	
1995	The Infiltrator	Party Guest No. 2	TV movie
