= Heavenly Pursuits =

- Theatrical release poster
- Directed by: Charles Gormley
- Screenplay by: Charles Gormley
- Produced by: Michael Relph
- Starring: Tom Conti; Helen Mirren
- Cinematography: Michael Coulter
- Edited by: John Gow
- Music by: B. A. Robertson
- Production company: Channel Four Films
- Distributed by: Skouras Pictures (USA); Recorded Rel(UK)
- Release dates: 1 July 1986 (Taormina Film Fest); 19 October 1986 (USA); 23 January 1987 (UK)
- Running time: 92 minutes
- Country: United Kingdom
- Language: English
- Budget: £1.15 million
- Box office: $0.3 million

Heavenly Pursuits (known as Gospel According to Vic in some territories) is a 1986 Scottish comedy film written and directed by Charles Gormley and starring Tom Conti, Helen Mirren, and David Hayman. Set in Glasgow, Scotland, the film is about a teacher at a Catholic school whose students are searching for two more miracles that would promote the late Edith Semple to sainthood. A nonbeliever himself, the teacher's scepticism is challenged when he becomes involved in seemingly miraculous events.

== Plot ==
At the Vatican, Father Cobb from the Blessed Edith Semple School in Glasgow, offers evidence to promote Blessed Edith's elevation to sainthood. Downplaying the idea of miracles, a Vatican official sends the "little father" back to Scotland. Undeterred, Father Cobb continues to lead the school in prayer, invoking Blessed Edith's intercession to heal the sick, including little Alice McKenzie who is crippled.

Remedial teacher Vic Mathews is not a believer in miracles, placing his faith instead in his students and in their ability to learn. He is attracted to the new music teacher, Ruth Chancellor, who appears unimpressed with his awkward advances. After fainting at a bus stop, Vic is rushed to the hospital, where tests reveal the presence of a fatal brain tumour. The doctor sees little benefit in telling Vic about his condition.

Meanwhile, the Headmaster complains to the teachers' union representative, Jeff Jeffries, about Vic writing letters to the school board to keep a failed student, Stevie Deans, from being sent to a special school. Convinced he can reach the withdrawn student, Vic refuses to accept the Headmaster's judgement. At a friendly card game at Vic's apartment later that night, Jeff convinces Vic after a few drinks to back off on his letter-writing campaign. After everyone leaves, a drunken Vic witnesses a strange event: his stereo plays without being turned on.

The next day, Vic discovers he is able to teach basic math concepts more effectively by using examples from the gambling world. Even Stevie Deans responds to this new approach, showing he is clearly far from stupid. When Vic reports his progress, however, the Headmaster is more excited about the apparent healing of little Alice McKenzie. That night at a pub, a drunken Vic dismisses the newspaper reports of Alice's miraculous recovery, and just before the conversation turns ugly, Vic faints again. Ruth offers to drive him home, and the next day in church, she prays for Vic, whose tireless teaching efforts soon lead to yet another breakthrough with another "special" student.

Later, Vic is summoned to the roof to rescue a student trapped on an adjacent roof. When he sees the boy slipping, Vic jumps across to the opposite roof, but is unable to prevent the boy from falling 40 feet through a tree that fortunately breaks his fall. Vic also loses his hold and falls from the roof. The student ends up with two broken legs, but Vic escapes with only minor scratches. When Father Cobb calls it a miracle, Vic dismisses the idea, but at the hospital, new x-rays reveal that his brain tumour is gone. The doctor has no explanation and never mentions the tumour to Vic. The hospital administrator orders the x-rays destroyed, but the radiologist holds onto them.

Soon the newspapers report Vic's survived fall and the "miraculous academic improvement" of Stevie Deans. The bishop arrives and is annoyed by all the miracle stories, and Stevie is rushed out of town to a retreat, away from news reporters. School officials announce that there were no miracles involved with the student—just marked improvement based on good teaching. Vic is also trying to convince himself that his survived fall was no miracle. Ruth even takes him to a newspaper office showing him numerous stories of unfounded miracles.

Meanwhile, after seeing Vic dismissing the idea of miracles in a television interview, the radiologist delivers the x-rays to Father Cobb as "definitive proof" that a miracle actually happened—the complete healing of an inoperable brain tumour. Father Cobb considers the legal implications for the radiologist, and then burns the x-rays saying, "We don't need proof—we believe."

The story of Vic's miraculous recovery is soon reported on the news. Confused by what's happened, and told he is "special", Vic goes to the hospital to heal the student's broken legs, but soon realizes his folly. Back at school, Robbie complains to Vic that he wants to be a "special" student too. They go back to the roof where he and Jeff try to explain how Vic was able to make the 17-foot leap. To prove it was not a miracle, Vic makes the jump again. Afterwards, Jeff reveals Stevie Deans' whereabouts, and Vic heads to the railway station to bring Stevie back.

Ruth asks Robbie to help her find Vic, and the two rush off to the railway station, where Ruth and Vic unite in a loving embrace. Robbie stumbles into a crowd and is forced onto a red carpet just as Princess Diana approaches. A photographer hands Robbie some flowers and he offers them to the princess as the worldwide press photographers capture the moment. Vic and Ruth leave by train to bring another "special" student back to school.

== Cast ==
- Tom Conti as Vic Mathews
- Helen Mirren as Ruth Chancellor
- David Hayman as Jeff Jeffries
- Brian Pettifer as Father Cobb
- Jennifer Black as Sister
- Dave Anderson as Headmaster
- Moica Brady as Radiologist
- Ewen Bremner as Stevie Deans
- Tom Busby as Brusse
- Juliet Cadzow as Woman Teacher
- Doreen Cameron as Nurse
- Robert W. Carr as Night Editor
- Fiona Chalmers as Child in Vic's Class
- Margo Croan as Woman at Bus Stop
- Jake D'Arcy as Wee Man in Bar
- Bill Denniston as Bishop
- Ron Donachie as Big Man in Bar
- Mel Donald as 1st Man at Bus Stop
- James Gibb as MacArthur
- Sam Graham as Doctor Knox
- Grace Kirby as French Teacher
- Phillip J. Maxwell as Wee Mike
- Ronnie McCann as Boy on Roof
- David McCormack as James
- Jenny McCrindle as Carole Adams
- Billy McElhaney as Reporter 2
- David McKail as Consultant
- Lawrie McNicol as Reporter 1
- John Mitchell as Gibbons
- Sandy Neilson as 2nd Man at Bus Stop
- Paul Nolan as Robbie
- Robert Peterson as MacKrimmond
- John Shedden as Dentist
- Jay Smith as Photographer
- Carey Wilson as Education Officer
- Kara Wilson as Registrar McAllister

== Production ==
=== Filming locations ===
Gospel According to Vic was filmed in various locations throughout Glasgow, Scotland.

- Glasgow Cathedral
- St. Alphonsus Church
- Queen's Park School
- Glasgow Herald
- Glasgow City Chambers (representing the Vatican)
- Glasgow Queen Street railway station

== Reception ==
Gospel According to Vic received positive reviews upon its theatrical release in the United States. In her review in the Washington Post, Rita Kempley called it "a comedy of marvels great and small, proves a timely answer to a moviegoer's prayers." She compared this "sweet-natured and idiosyncratic work" to some of Bill Forsyth's best films. She lauded Tom Conti's performance with his "perfect timing and rumpled magnetism." Kempley concludes, "There's always room for doubt in this delightfully quirky screenplay, with its grumbling atheists and gosh-almighty faithful. Gormley needs no special effects to create his aura of heavenly intervention, relying instead on ambiguous incidents and secondhand testimony."

In his review in The New York Times, Walter Goodman singles out Conti's performance:

If there is an actor who can compete with the blessed Tom Conti for quirky charm, bring him on. As Vic, mischief glitters in his soulful eyes; it sneaks through the cracks in his voice and the gaps in his reactions. Even in action, he seems bemused at the oddness of what he is about. Mr. Conti makes Vic a joy to be around, whether he is rousing his class to outbursts of educational hysteria or admiring the way Helen Mirren, the new teacher, fills out a skirt.

Goodman concludes, "Gospel According to Vic may not be a miracle, but it's definitely a blessing."

In their review in Spirituality & Practice, Frederic and Mary Ann Brussat wrote:

Writer/director Charles Gormley, a long-time associate of acclaimed filmmaker Bill Forsyth, demonstrates an uncanny appreciation for the idiosyncrasies of his characters. He draws out top-drawer performances from Tom Conti and from Helen Mirren ... Gospel According to Vic ends enchantingly with two moments of grace—one involving the love embrace of Vic and Ruth and one involving a boy who has a surprise encounter with the best-known member of the Royal Family.

The film opened on 17 October 1986 in the United States and grossed $267,249. It opened on three screens in the United Kingdom on 23 January 1987 and grossed £7,005 for the weekend.
