= Preauricular sinus and cyst =

Type of malformation of the outer ear

- Other names: Congenital auricular fistula, congenital preauricular fistula, ear pit, preauricular cyst
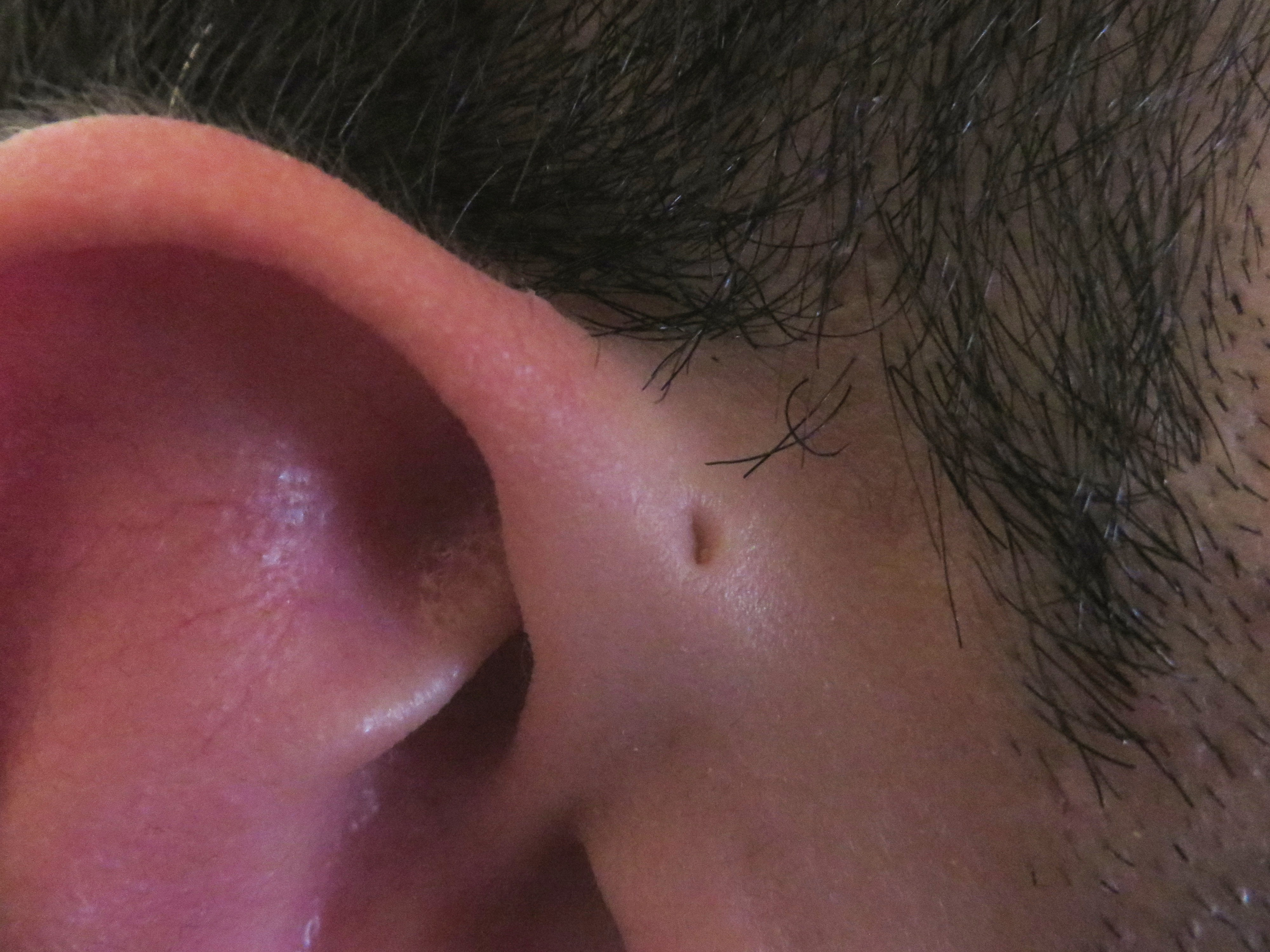
- Preauricular sinus on right ear
- Specialty: Otorhinolaryngology
- Frequency: 1-10% of people

Preauricular sinuses, also known as preauricular pits and preauricular cysts, are common malformations present at birth that involve the external ear. A cyst does not connect with the skin, while a sinus does. Both ears are often affected. They may be associated with other defects such as branchio-oto-renal syndrome.

They are often inherited from a persons parents.

They affect about 0.1–0.9% of people in the US, 0.9% in the UK, and 4–10% in Asia and parts of Africa.

== Signs and symptoms ==
=== Complications ===
Occasionally a preauricular sinus or cyst can become infected. Most preauricular sinuses are asymptomatic, and remain untreated unless they become infected too often. These sinuses or pits can be excised surgically, but often present a high risk of recurrence.

Those with preauricular sinuses frequently report an intense itch and urge to rub, press, or scratch the affected area, which often results in a foul-smelling, mucoid, or purulent discharge. Ear pits may also involuntarily "leak" or drain on occasion.

The presence of discharge is from a combination of factors, such as the accumulation and entrapment of dead skin cells, bacteria, and other debris. There is an element of the body's natural defense mechanisms involved as well, given that many experience the presence of serous exudate and formation of a tiny scab covering the pit hole. While the body is naturally protecting the preauricular sinus from foreign invaders, it is also believed to be attempting to heal the opening, which does not occur due to the condition being congenital.

While some are prone to insert foreign objects into the external opening (hole), this is discouraged to prevent potential trauma and infection.

== Causes ==
Preauricular sinuses and cysts result from developmental defects of the first and second pharyngeal arches. This and other ear malformations are sometimes associated with renal anomalies. In rare circumstances these pits may be seen in genetic conditions such as branchio-oto-renal syndrome; however these conditions are always concurrent with other health concerns.

== Treatment ==
Treatment typically include the following:

- Surgical excision is indicated with recurrent fistular infections, preferably after significant healing of the infection. In case of a persistent infection, infection drainage is performed during the excision operation. The operation is generally performed by an appropriately trained specialist surgeon, e.g., an otolaryngologist or a specialist General Surgeon.
- The fistula can be excised as a cosmetic operation even though no infection appeared. The procedure is considered an elective operation in the absence of any associated complications.

== See also ==
- Branchial cleft cyst
- Thyroglossal cyst
- Lachiewicz–Sibley syndrome
- List of cutaneous conditions

== Bibliography ==
- Leopardi G, Chiarella G, Conti S, Cassandro E (December 2008). "Surgical treatment of recurring preauricular sinus: supra-auricular approach". Acta Otorhinolaryngologica Italica. 28 (6): 302–5. PMC 2689545. PMID 19205595.
- Kim JR, Kim DH, Kong SK, Gu PM, Hong TU, Kim BJ, Heo KW (November 2014). "Congenital periauricular fistulas: possible variants of the preauricular sinus". International Journal of Pediatric Otorhinolaryngology. 78 (11): 1843–8. doi:10.1016/j.ijporl.2014.08.005. PMID 25190621. S2CID 1885028.
