= Lolita (1962 film) =

1962 film by Stanley Kubrick

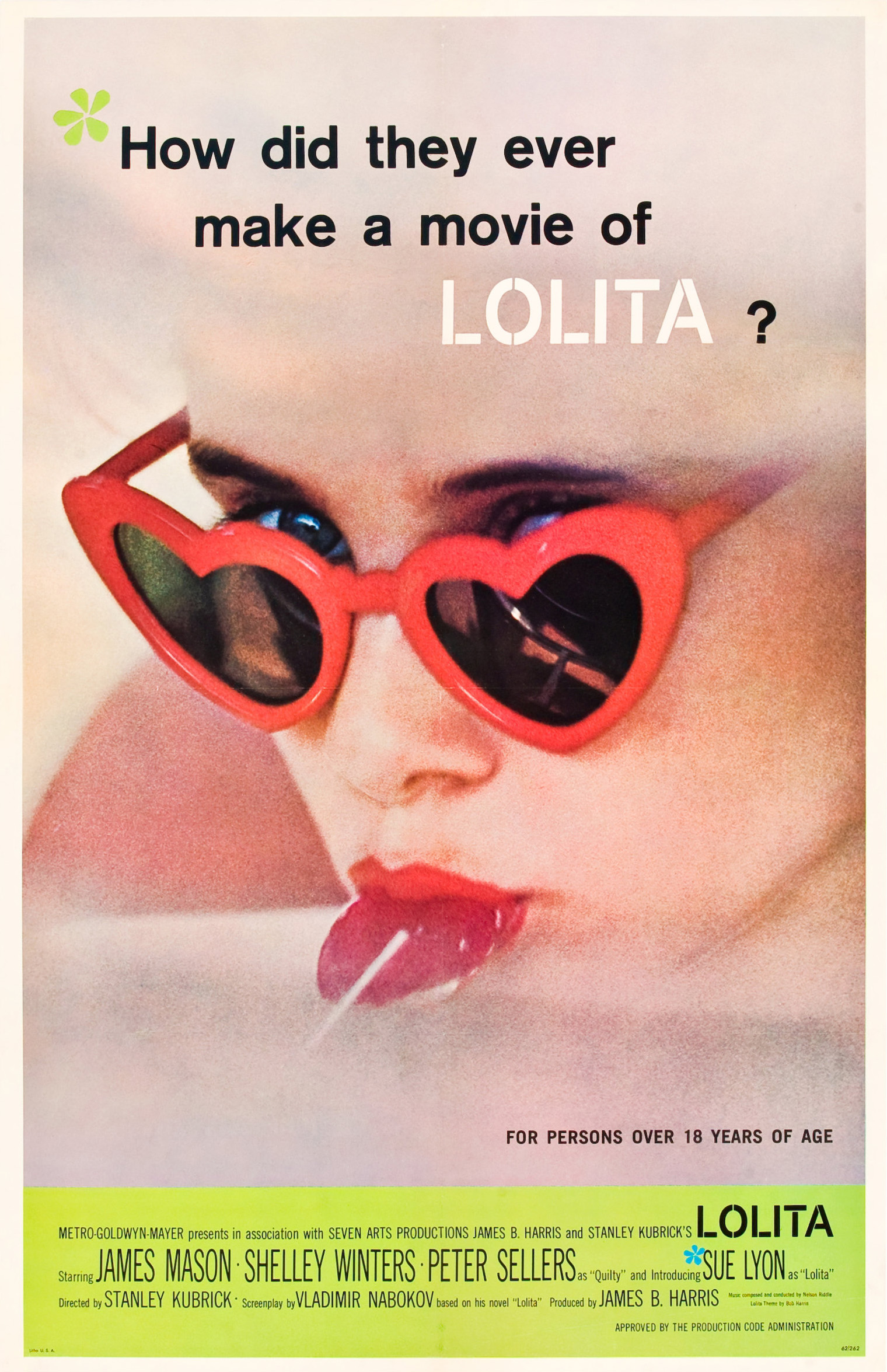
- Theatrical release poster
- Directed by: Stanley Kubrick
- Screenplay by: Vladimir Nabokov
- Based on: Lolita by Vladimir Nabokov
- Produced by: James B. Harris
- Starring: James Mason; Shelley Winters; Peter Sellers; Sue Lyon
- Cinematography: Oswald Morris
- Edited by: Anthony Harvey
- Music by: Nelson Riddle
- Theme song by: Bob Harris
- Production companies: Seven Arts; Harris Kubrick Pictures; A.A. Productions, Ltd.; Anya Pictures; Transworld Pictures
- Distributed by: Metro-Goldwyn-Mayer
- Release dates: June 13, 1962 (New York City); June 24, 1962 (United States); September 6, 1962 (United Kingdom)
- Running time: 152 minutes
- Country: United States; United Kingdom
- Language: English
- Budget: $1.5–2 million
- Box office: $9.2 million

Lolita is a 1962 black comedy psychological drama film directed by Stanley Kubrick, and starring James Mason, Shelley Winters, Peter Sellers, and Sue Lyon in her film debut. Adapted for the screen by Vladimir Nabokov from his 1955 novel, the film follows a middle-aged literature professor who develops an infatuation with an adolescent girl.

The novel was considered "unfilmable" when Kubrick acquired the rights around the time of its U.S. publication. Owing to restrictions imposed by the Hays Code (1934–68), Kubrick and producer James B. Harris were compelled to tone down the pedophilic elements that were central to the novel's narrative, and deliberately made Lolita's age vague. Lyon was 14 years old at the time filming began in London in early 1961.

Released in the United States in June 1962, Lolita received mixed reviews from critics and was met with controversy due to its subject matter. At the time of its original release, it was banned in Ireland and some regions of Germany. The film was a box-office success, however, grossing $9.2 million in the United States.

== Plot ==
Humbert Humbert, a middle-aged European professor of French literature, arrives in Ramsdale, New Hampshire, searching for summer accommodation before his professorship begins at Beardsley College, Ohio. Charlotte Haze, a sexually frustrated widow, offers him a room to rent at her house. Initially uninterested, Humbert changes his mind when he sees Charlotte's young daughter Dolores, nicknamed "Lolita", and is immediately smitten with her.

Wanting Humbert's time for herself, Charlotte sends Dolores to an all-girl summer camp. After the Hazes depart for camp, the maid gives Humbert a love confession letter from Charlotte demanding that he vacate immediately, unless he reciprocates and marries her. Despite laughing while reading the letter, Humbert stays and marries Charlotte.

In Lolita's absence, Humbert becomes withdrawn, and Charlotte grows unfulfilled and upset. She discovers Humbert's diary detailing his passion for Dolores and his contempt for Charlotte. Distraught, she runs outside, is hit by a car and dies. Humbert is visited by Charlotte's friends, who mistake his apathy with suicidal ideation and reveal that she had little time left anyway, since nephritis affected her single kidney.

Humbert picks up Dolores from camp, telling her that Charlotte is sick in a hospital. They stay overnight in a hotel hosting police convention attendees, and attract the attention of another guest. (Note: Unlike in the novel, it is visible to the audience early on that this ubiquitous character is Clare Quilty, who was first introduced in Dolores' school summer dance.) While Dolores sleeps upstairs, this stranger insinuates himself upon Humbert, presenting himself as a policeman and cryptically steering the conversation to Humbert and Dolores. The next morning, Dolores suggests to Humbert that they play a "game" she learned at camp, and it is implied that they have sex. Humbert later confesses to Dolores that her mother is dead. Grief-stricken, she stays with Humbert. The two commence a trip cross country, acting publicly as father and daughter.

In the fall, Humbert initiates his position at Beardsley College and enrolls Dolores in high school there. A jealous Humbert worries about her involvement with male classmates and the lead she has been offered in the school play, and people grow curious about his protectiveness. One night, he returns home to find a stranger in his darkened living room. Claiming to be Dr. Zempf, the psychologist from Dolores's school, he inquires about her knowledge of "the facts of life" and coerces Humbert into allowing her to participate in the school play.

During a performance of the play, Humbert learns that Dolores has been lying about spending Saturday afternoons at piano practice. They have an argument and Humbert decides to take Dolores on the road again. Dolores objects at first, but seemingly changes her mind after making a surreptitious phone call. Once on the road, Humbert realizes that they are being followed by a car. Dolores falls ill and he takes her to the hospital. One night, a mysterious call to his motel room prompts Humbert to visit the hospital in order to discharge Dolores, but he is told that she already left with a man claiming to be her uncle. Humbert is devastated.

Three years later, he receives a letter from Dolores, now pregnant, married to an unemployed and half-deaf mechanic, and in need of money. Humbert visits her and asks who had kidnapped her from the hospital. She says that it was Clare Quilty, a famous playwright and the intrusive stranger who kept crossing their path all along, disguising himself as a policeman and later Dr. Zempf. Dolores was infatuated with Quilty ever since his fling with Charlotte years ago, and carried on an affair with him at Beardsley. She left the hospital with him when he promised her a Hollywood contract. Instead, he secluded her in a dude ranch near Santa Fe and demanded that she join his depraved lifestyle and act in his child pornography, which she refused.

Humbert begs Dolores to leave with him. She refuses, on account of her new predicament, but apologizes for cheating. Humbert gives Dolores $13,000, her money from the sale of Charlotte's house. He then leaves to confront Quilty in his mansion at gunpoint. (Note: Contrary to chronological order, this scene is shown at the start of the film.) A drunk Quilty tries to dodge the situation with bizarre offers (including an invitation to attend executions (Note: It is unclear whether by "not many people know that the chair is painted yellow" Quilty refers to the electric chair or, instead, implies that he complements his child pornography with the filming and distribution of snuff films)), but is shot dead by Humbert. A postscript reveals that Humbert later died of coronary thrombosis awaiting trial for Quilty's murder.

== Cast ==
- James Mason as Humbert "Hum" Humbert
- Shelley Winters as Charlotte Haze-Humbert
- Sue Lyon as Dolores "Lolita" Haze
- Peter Sellers as Clare Quilty / Dr. Zempf
- Gary Cockrell as Richard "Dick" Schiller
- Jerry Stovin as John Farlow, Ramsdale Lawyer
- Diana Decker as Jean Farlow
- Lois Maxwell as Nurse Mary Lore
- Cec Linder as Dr. Keegee
- Susanne Gibbs as Mona
- Bill Greene as George Swine, The Hotel Night Manager In Bryceton
- Shirley Douglas as Mrs. Starch, The Piano Teacher In Ramsdale
- Marianne Stone as Vivian Darkbloom, Quilty's Companion
- Marion Mathie as Miss Lebone
- James Dyrenforth as Frederick Beale Sr.
- Maxine Holden as Miss Fromkiss, The Hospital Receptionist
- John Harrison as Tom
- Colin Maitland as Charlie Sedgewick
- C. Denier Warren as Potts
- Ed Bishop as Ambulance Attendant

== Production ==
=== Development ===
Stanley Kubrick and producer James B. Harris acquired the rights to Vladimir Nabokov's Lolita, a novel considered unfilmable, several years after it was first published in September 1955 in Paris by Olympia Press, which specialized in pornographic literature. Kubrick and Harris secured the rights at a fee of $150,000. Initially considered a "dirty book" in an era when literary censorship meant jail time and fines for publishers, Lolita was not published in the United States until August 1958 by G. P. Putnam's Sons, after it had gradually established its literary reputation.

When Marlon Brando fired Kubrick from One-Eyed Jacks in November 1958, the director issued a press release saying that he was resigning from Brando's picture "with deep regret" so that he could "commence work on Lolita".

=== Screenplay ===
Novelist Calder Willingham was originally hired to adapt Lolita for the screen, but was let go after Kubrick expressed dislike for his early drafts. Kubrick approached Nabokov to adapt his own work instead, which he agreed to under the condition that he receive fifteen percent of the film's profits as well as a salary of $35,000 for his writing credit. The film's screenplay is credited solely to Nabokov, although very little of what he provided (later published in a shortened version) was used in the film itself. Nabokov, following the success of the novel, moved to Hollywood and penned a script for a film adaptation between March and September 1960. Unfamiliar with the conventions of screenwriting, Nabokov's first draft was extremely long, running over 400 pages, which Kubrick estimated would constitute a seven hour-long film.

As producer Harris remarked, "You couldn't make it. You couldn't lift it". Nabokov remained polite about the film in public but in a 1962 interview before seeing the film, commented that it may turn out to be "the swerves of a scenic drive as perceived by the horizontal passenger of an ambulance". Nabokov's revised screenplay was significantly shorter but continued to undergo revisions, despite Nabokov receiving sole credit.

Harris said that he and Kubrick, through casting, changed Nabokov's book as "we wanted it to come off as a love story and to feel very sympathetic with Humbert."

=== Casting ===
Several actors were considered for the lead role of Humbert Humbert in the film's early development. In 1959, Errol Flynn sought the role, pitching himself opposite his romantic companion Beverly Aadland (whom he began dating when she was fifteen years old) as Lolita. Flynn met with Kubrick and Harris, though Harris commented that "it was purely a courtesy meeting on our part. There was never any suggestion that we would use him, but he had earned the courtesy of the meeting." Flynn, who was in ill health at the time, died in October 1959 of a heart attack. Laurence Olivier, who co-starred in Kubrick's Spartacus, was offered the part but declined at the advice of his and Kurbick's mutual agent. Kubrick then considered Peter Ustinov, who won an Oscar for Spartacus, but decided against him. Harris suggested David Niven, who accepted the part but withdrew for fear that the sponsors of his TV show, Four Star Playhouse (1952), would object to the subject matter. Noël Coward and Rex Harrison were also considered.

James Mason was offered the role but initially declined the role due to a Broadway engagement while recommending his daughter, Portland, for the role of Lolita. "I always thought he had just the right qualities for Humbert," said Kubrick. "You know, handsome but vulnerable... sort of easy-to-hurt and also a romantic—because that was true of Humbert, of course, that beneath that veneer of sophistication and cynicism, and that sort of affected sneer, he was terribly romantic and sentimental." After reconsideration, however, Mason accepted Kubrick and Harris's offer and dropped out of the Broadway production in order to star in the film.

Peter Sellers was cast in the role of Clare Quilty, which was greatly expanded from that in the novel, allowing Sellers to adopt a variety of disguises throughout the film. Early on in the film, Quilty appears as himself: a conceited, avant-garde playwright with a superior manner. Later he is an inquisitive policeman on the porch of the hotel, where Humbert and Lolita are staying. Next he is the intrusive Beardsley High School psychologist, Doctor Zempf who persuades Humbert to give Lolita more freedom in her after-school activities. He is seen as a photographer backstage at Lolita's play, and, later in the film, as an anonymous phone caller conducting a survey.

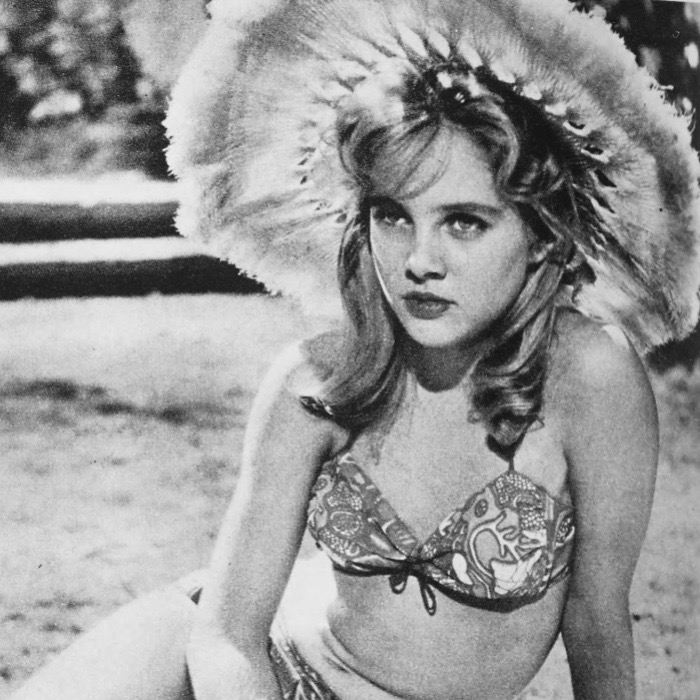
Sue Lyon as Lolita

Jill Haworth was offered the role of Lolita but was under contract to Otto Preminger, who refused to allow her. Hayley Mills was offered the role but her parents refused permission. Joey Heatherton, Sandra Dee, and Tuesday Weld also were potential candidates for the part. Kubrick ultimately chose 14-year-old Sue Lyon for the title role after having seen her on The Loretta Young Show.

Producer Harris commented that he and Kubrick "were careful not to make her childlike. Sue Lyon was an extremely attractive and mature girl—14 when we did the film, but I would agree that she actually looked a little older than her years. I don't think anyone in the theater would think you were a disgusting old man if you found her sexually attractive." He also said, in a 2015 Film Comment interview: "We made sure when we cast her that she was a definite sex object, not something that could be interpreted as being perverted." Although Nabokov originally thought that Lyon was the right selection, years later, he said that the ideal Lolita would have been Catherine Demongeot, a French actress four years younger than Lyon.

Some of the minor parts were played by Canadian and American actors, such as Cec Linder, Lois Maxwell, Jerry Stovin and Diana Decker, who were based in England at the time.

=== Filming ===
Principal photography of Lolita began in London in January 1961. Though the film is set entirely in the United States, Kubrick had to film in England, as much of the money to finance the film was raised there, with the condition that it also be spent there. Grover Road in Oxhey Village near Watford was used as a stand-in for the American midwest during the sequence in which Humbert searches for Lolita in the film's final act. In addition, Kubrick had been living in England since 1961 and suffered from a deathly fear of flying. Hilfield Castle is also featured as Quilty's "Pavor Manor". While the novel was set in the 1940s, Kubrick gave the film a contemporary setting, shooting many of the exterior scenes in England with some back-projected scenery shot in the United States, including upstate eastern New York, along NY 9N in the eastern Adirondacks, and a hilltop view of Albany from Rensselaer, on the east bank of the Hudson River.

With Nabokov's consent, Kubrick changed the order in which events unfolded by moving what was the novel's ending to the start of the film. Kubrick determined that while this sacrificed a great ending, it helped maintain audience interest, as he believed that intrigue in the novel sagged after Humbert "seduced" Lolita halfway through.

Actor James Mason clashed with co-star Peter Sellers during the filming of their scenes together, angered by Sellers' spontaneity and tendency to improvise dialogue, resulting in Mason sometimes storming off the set. Shelley Winters commented that Sellers "seemed to be acting on a different planet," and added that she struggled to connect with both Mason and Sellers.

=== Voice-over narration ===
Humbert uses the term "nymphet" to describe Lolita, which he explains and uses in the novel; it appears twice in the film and its meaning is left undefined. In a voice-over on the morning after the Ramsdale High School dance, Humbert confides in his diary, "What drives me insane is the twofold nature of this nymphet, of every nymphet perhaps, this mixture in my Lolita of tender, dreamy childishness and a kind of eerie vulgarity. I know it is madness to keep this journal, but it gives me a strange thrill to do so. And only a loving wife could decipher my microscopic script."

== Music ==
The music for the film was composed by Nelson Riddle and Bob Harris (the main theme was solely by Bob Harris), and performed by Riddle's orchestra. Lolita marked the final film in Kubrick's filmography to feature a conventional musical score, and featured a number of "pastiche-type themes" reminiscent of Hollywood romance films.

The recurring dance number first heard on the radio when Humbert meets Lolita in the garden later became a hit single under the name "Lolita Ya Ya" with Sue Lyon credited with the singing on the single version. The flip side was a 1960s-style light rock song called "Turn off the Moon" penned by Harris and Al Stillman and also sung by Sue Lyon. There is also a version released as a single credited to Nelson Riddle on the "B-side" of his Route 66 Theme (Capitol 4741). "Lolita Ya Ya" was later recorded by other bands; it was also a 1962 hit single for The Ventures, reaching 61 on the Billboard Hot 100. A review in Billboard stated, "There've been a number of versions of the title tune from the hit film Lolita but this figures the strongest to date. The usual Ventures guitar sound is neatly augmented with voices."

== Release ==
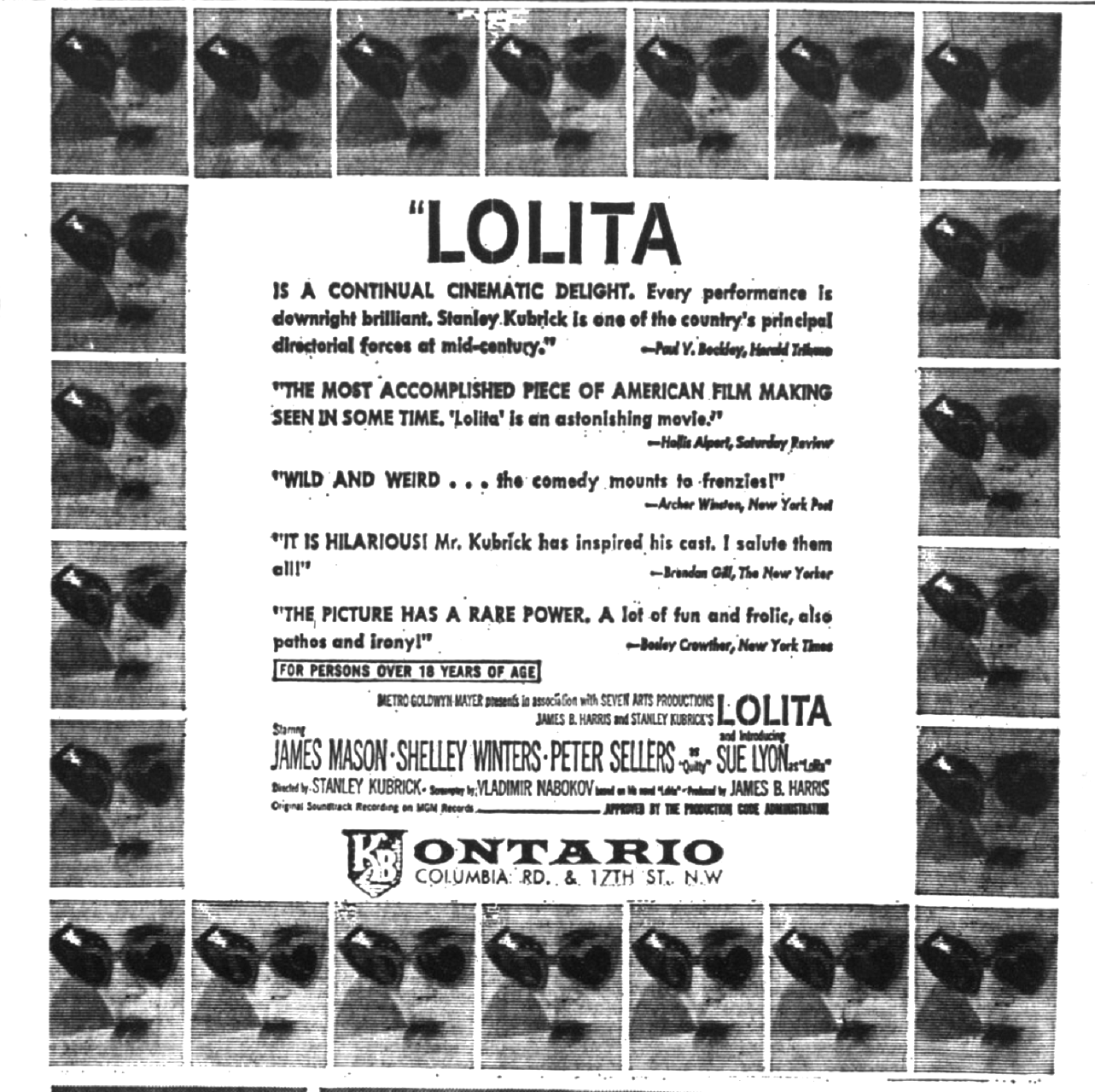
Theatrical advertisement from 1962

Lolita premiered on June 13, 1962, in New York City before opening nationwide on June 24, 1962. It performed fairly well with little advertising, relying mostly on word-of-mouth; many critics seemed uninterested or dismissive of the film while others gave it glowing reviews. However, the film was very controversial, due to the hebephilia-related content. The Observer called it the "Lolita fiasco."

The film had its United Kingdom premiere in London on September 6, 1962.

=== Censorship ===
At the time the film was released, the ratings system was not in effect and the Hays Code, dating back to the 1930s, governed film production. The censorship of the time inhibited Kubrick's direction; Kubrick later commented that, "because of all the pressure over the Production Code and the Catholic Legion of Decency at the time, I believe I didn't sufficiently dramatize the erotic aspect of Humbert's relationship with Lolita. If I could do the film over again, I would have stressed the erotic component of their relationship with the same weight Nabokov did." Kubrick hinted at the nature of their relationship indirectly, through double entendre and visual cues such as Humbert painting Lolita's toes. In a 1972 Newsweek interview (after the ratings system had been introduced in late 1968), Kubrick said that he "probably wouldn't have made the film" had he realized in advance how difficult the censorship problems would be.

The film is deliberately vague over Lolita's age. Kubrick commented, "I think that some people had the mental picture of a nine-year-old, but Lolita was twelve and a half in the book; Sue Lyon was thirteen." Lyon was fourteen by the time filming started and fifteen when it finished.

Although passed uncut in the United Kingdom, Lolita was given an X rating by the British Board of Film Classification (BBFC) in 1962, meaning no one under 16 years of age was permitted to watch. Despite the BBFC's approval of the film, it was met with some resistance from Britain's Christian Action organization, who insisted that "no classification of any kind should be granted [to the film]." It was banned in some countries, including Ireland and on some United States military bases in Germany.

=== Alternate versions ===
The scene where Lolita first "seduces" Humbert as he lies on the cot is approximately 10 seconds longer in the British and Australian cuts of the film. In the print released in the United States, the shot fades as she whispers the details of the "game" she played with Charlie at camp. In the British and Australian cuts, the shot continues as Humbert mumbles that he is not familiar with the game. She then bends down again to whisper more details. Kubrick then cuts to a closer shot of Lolita's face as she says "Well, alrighty then" and then fades as she begins to descend onto Humbert on the cot.

The 1992 LaserDisc released by The Criterion Collection, which was supervised and approved by Kubrick, alternates between a 1.33:1 and a 1.66:1 aspect ratios as the director intended. Subsequent home media releases present the entire film in a 1:66:1 aspect ratio, as prior DVD and Blu-ray releases had. (Note: The DVD and Blu-ray releases from Warner Bros. Home Entertainment present the film in a 1:66:1 aspect ratio, which was Kubrick's preferred presentation for his post-2001 home media releases. The Criterion Collection released Lolita on LaserDisc in 1992, featuring alternating aspect ratios of 1:33:1 and 1:66:1, as supervised by Kubrick. In 2026, The Criterion Collection reissued the film in 4K UHD Blu-ray format, presenting it solely in 1:66:1, as prior DVD and Blu-ray releases had.)

=== Home media ===
Lolita was released on VHS in 1991 by MGM/UA Home Entertainment. The Criterion Collection released the film on LaserDisc in 1992, with Kubrick's supervision.

Warner Bros. Home Entertainment released Lolita on VHS and DVD in 2001 as part of the Kubrick Collection, presented in its original aspect ratio of 1:66:1. A standalone reissue of the DVD was released by Warner on October 23, 2007. Warner released the film for the first time on Blu-ray on May 31, 2011.

The film had its world debut in 4K UHD Blu-ray format as part of The Complete Kubrick box set, released by The Criterion Collection on October 20, 2026. The box set, which features all 13 feature films directed by Kubrick, includes new and archival bonus materials pertaining to Lolita, including never-before-seen screen tests for James Mason and Sue Lyon. The 4K restoration of the film by The Criterion Collection had screened the year prior at the 82nd Venice International Film Festival.

== Reception ==
=== Box office ===
The film was a commercial success, grossing $9,250,000 domestically. During its initial run, the film earned an estimated $4.5 million in North American rentals.

=== Critical response ===
==== Contemporary ====
Original trailer for Lolita

Critical reaction to Lolita was mixed, especially in the United States. Kubrick biographer David Hughes notes that American critics "were largely uncomplimentary towards Lolita, not so much attacking the film itself as Kubrick's audacity in adapting the book in the first place."

Among the positive reviews, Bosley Crowther of The New York Times wrote that the film was "conspicuously different" from the novel and had "some strange confusions of style and mood", but nevertheless had "a rare power, a garbled but often moving push toward an off-beat communication." Richard L. Coe of The Washington Post called it "a peculiarly brilliant film", with a tone "not of hatred, but of mocking true. Director and author have a viewpoint on modern life that is not flattering but it is not despising, either. It is regret for the human comedy." Philip K. Scheuer of the Los Angeles Times declared that the film "manages to hit peaks of comedy shrilly dissonant but on an adult level, that are rare indeed, and at the same time to underline the tragedy in human communication, human communion, between people who've got their signals hopelessly crossed." The Monthly Film Bulletin wrote that the primary themes of the film were "obsession and incongruity", and since Kubrick was "an intellectual director with little feeling for erotic tension ... one is the more readily disposed to accept Kubrick's alternative approach as legitimate."

In a review for The New Yorker, Brendan Gill wrote that "Kubrick is wonderfully self-confident; his camera having conveyed to us within the first five minutes that it can perform any wonders its master may require of it, he proceeds to offer us a succession of scenes broadly sketched and broadly acted for laughs, and laugh we do, no matter how morbid the circumstances." Arlene Croce in Sight & Sound wrote that "Lolita is—in its way—a good film." She found Nabokov's screenplay "a model of adaptation" and the cast "near-perfect", though she described Kubrick's attempts at eroticism as "perfunctory and misguided" and thought his "gift for visual comedy is as faint as his depiction of sensuality."

Variety had a mixed assessment, calling the film "occasionally amusing but shapeless", and likening it to "a bee from which the stinger has been removed. It still buzzes with a sort of promising irreverence, but it lacks the power to shock and eventually makes very little point either as comedy or satire." Harrison's Reports was negative, writing, "You don't have to be an emulating, prissyish uncle from Dubuque to say that the film leaves you with a feeling that is repulsively disgusting in much of its telling," adding that "even if the exhibitor makes a dollar on the booking, he may feel a sense of shame as he plods his weary way down to the bank." Stanley Kauffmann of The New Republic called Lolita "tantalizingly unsatisfactory".

==== Modern appraisal ====
The film has been re-appraised by critics over time and has a score of 82% on review aggregator website Rotten Tomatoes, based on 91 reviews and with an average rating of 7.8/10. The critical consensus reads: "Kubrick's Lolita adapts its seemingly unadaptable source material with a sly comedic touch and a sterling performance by James Mason that transforms the controversial novel into something refreshingly new without sacrificing its essential edge." Metacritic gives the film a score of 79 out of 100, based on reviews by 14 critics, indicating "generally favorable" reviews.

Biographer Thomas Allen Nelson wrote in 2000 that Lolita remained one of Kubrick's "most unappreciated and misunderstood" early films, attributing this to how it "develops a surrealist mise-en-scène through a deceptively sparse naturalism" and "the strength of its performances."

Filmmaker David Lynch stated that Lolita was his favorite Kubrick film, while filmmakers Sofia Coppola and Paul Thomas Anderson have cited it among their favorite films of all time.

=== Accolades ===
Award/association	Year	Category	Recipient(s) and nominee(s)	Result	Ref.
Academy Awards	1963	Best Screenplay – Based on Material from Another Medium	Vladimir Nabokov	Nominated	
British Academy Film Awards	1963	Best British Actor	James Mason	Nominated	
Directors Guild of America Awards	1963	Outstanding Directorial Achievement in Motion Pictures	Stanley Kubrick	Nominated	
Golden Globe Awards	1963	Best Actor in a Motion Picture – Drama	James Mason	Nominated	
Golden Globe Awards	1963	Best Actress in a Motion Picture – Drama	Shelley Winters	Nominated	
Golden Globe Awards	1963	Best Supporting Actor – Motion Picture	Peter Sellers	Nominated	
Golden Globe Awards	1963	Best Director – Motion Picture	Stanley Kubrick	Nominated	
Golden Globe Awards	1963	Most Promising Newcomer – Female	Sue Lyon	Won	
Saturn Awards	2012	Best DVD Collection (Note: As part of Stanley Kubrick: The Essential Collection.)		Won	
Saturn Awards	2015	Best DVD or Blu-ray Collection (Note: As part of Stanley Kubrick: The Masterpiece Collection.)		Nominated	
Venice International Film Festival	1962	Golden Lion	Stanley Kubrick	Nominated	
Venice International Film Festival	2025	Venezia Classici Award	Best Restored Film	Nominated	

== Controversy ==
A 2020 article by journalist Sarah Weinman alleges that Harris, the producer of the film, had sex with Lyon during the shooting of the film when she was 14 years old. Although Lyon had remained silent regarding the rumors for many years, when asked for a statement on the planned remake of the film in 1996, she had stated:

"My destruction as a person dates from that film. Lolita exposed me to temptations no girl of that age should undergo. I defy any pretty girl who is rocketed to stardom at 14 in a sex nymphet role to stay on a level path thereafter."

== Other film adaptations ==
A 1997 film adaptation was directed by Adrian Lyne, starring Jeremy Irons as Humbert, Melanie Griffith as Charlotte, and Dominique Swain as Lolita. The film was widely publicized as being more faithful to Nabokov than the Kubrick film. Although many observed this was the case (such as Erica Jong writing in The New York Observer), the film was not as well received as Kubrick's version, and was a major box office bomb, first shown on the Showtime cable network, then released theatrically, grossing only $1 million at the US box office based on a $62 million budget.

== See also ==
- List of American films of 1962

== Sources ==
- Boyd, Brian (1991). Vladimir Nabokov: The American Years. Princeton, New Jersey: Princeton University Press. ISBN 978-0-691-02471-4.
- Duncan, Paul (2003). Stanley Kubrick: Visual Poet, 1928-1999. New York City, New York: Pocket Books. ISBN 978-3-822-81592-2.
- Gelmis, Joseph (1970). The Film Director as Superstar. Garden City, New York: Doubleday. ISBN 978-0-436-17370-7.
- Howard, James (1999). Stanley Kubrick Companion. London, England: Batsford. ISBN 978-0-713-48487-8.
- Hughes, David (2000). The Complete Kubrick. London, England: Virgin Pub. ISBN 978-0-7535-1272-2.
- Kael, Pauline (2011). Schwartz, Sanford (ed.). The Age of Movies: Selected Writings of Pauline Kael. New York City, New York: Penguin Books. ISBN 978-1-598-53109-1.
- Kaufmann, Stanley (1966). A World on Film. New York City, New York: Harper & Row. OCLC 329966.
- Kolker, Robert P.; Abrams, Nathan (2024). Kubrick: An Odyssey. New York City, New York: Pegasus Books. ISBN 978-1-639-36876-1.
- Lisanti, Tom (2001). Fantasy Femmes of Sixties Cinema: Interviews with 20 Actresses from Biker, Beach, and Elvis Movies. Jefferson, North Carolina: McFarland & Company. ISBN 978-0-7864-0868-9.
- Maltin, Leonard (2012). Leonard Maltin's 2013 Movie Guide. New York City, New York: Signet Books. ISBN 978-1-101-60463-2.
- Mikics, David (2020). Stanley Kubrick: American Filmmaker. New Haven, Connecticut: Yale University Press. ISBN 978-0-300-25561-4.
- Nabokov, Vladimir (1990) [1973]. Strong Opinions. London, England: Vintage. ISBN 978-0-307-78807-8.
- Nelson, Thomas Allen (2000). Kubrick: Inside a Film Artist's Maze. Bloomington, Indiana: Indiana University Press. ISBN 978-0-253-21390-7.
- Vickers, Graham (2008). Chasing Lolita: How Popular Culture Corrupted Nabokov's Little Girl All Over Again. Chicago, Illinois: Chicago Review Press. ISBN 978-1-55652-968-9.
