= John Poyner =

British sound editor

- Born: October 1933; Richmond, Surrey, England
- Died: November 16, 2018 (aged 85)
- Occupation: Sound editor
- Years active: 1955–present

John Poyner (October 1933 – November 16, 2018) was a British sound editor.

He won the Academy Award for Best Sound Editing at the 1967 Academy Awards for The Dirty Dozen.

He has over 60 credits since his start in 1955.

== Selected filmography ==
- The Saint (1997)
- Thelma & Louise (1991)
- Death Wish 3 (1985)
- Never Say Never Again (1983)
- An American Werewolf in London (1981)
- Phase IV (1974)
- Goodbye, Mr. Chips (1969)
- The Dirty Dozen (1967)
