= The Bedford Incident =

1965 film by James B. Harris

- Theatrical release poster
- Directed by: James B. Harris
- Screenplay by: James Poe
- Based on: The Bedford Incident; 1963 novel by Mark Rascovich
- Produced by: James B. Harris; Richard Widmark
- Starring: Richard Widmark; Sidney Poitier; James MacArthur; Martin Balsam; Wally Cox; Eric Portman
- Cinematography: Gilbert Taylor
- Edited by: John Jympson
- Music by: Gerard Schurmann
- Color process: Black and white
- Production company: Bedford Productions Ltd.
- Distributed by: Columbia Pictures
- Release dates: 11 October 1965 (Connecticut); 14 October 1965 (London); 2 November 1965 (New York City)
- Running time: 102 minutes
- Countries: United Kingdom; United States
- Language: English

The Bedford Incident is a 1965 British-American Cold War film starring Richard Widmark and Sidney Poitier, with James MacArthur, Martin Balsam, Wally Cox, and Eric Portman in support. It was directed by James B. Harris, and produced by Harris and Widmark, adapted from a 1963 novel of the same name by Mark Rascovich.

At the time The Bedford Incident was produced, Harris was best known as the producer of three of Stanley Kubrick's films. When Kubrick decided to make Dr. Strangelove as a satirical black comedy rather than a dramatic thriller, Harris still wanted to create a serious nuclear confrontation film. With Kubrick's blessing and advice, he did.

== Plot ==
It is 1963, at the height of the Cold War. The United States Navy destroyer USS Bedford is steaming in the Denmark Strait between Greenland and Iceland. It is under the strict command of controversial Captain Eric Finlander, an imperious martinet and relentless taskmaster. A popular civilian photojournalist, Ben Munceford, and the ship's new doctor, Lieutenant Commander Chester Potter, are dropped aboard by helicopter. Already there are Commodore Wolfgang Schrepke, a top U-boat ace of World War II and current Bundesmarine NATO naval advisor, and Ensign Ralston, an inexperienced young officer on edge from henpecking by Finlander for small errors.

When the Bedford detects a Soviet submarine just off the coast of Greenland, Finlander mercilessly stalks his prey as it goes from international waters into Greenland's territorial waters, seeking safety under an ice shelf. Sonar contact is lost in a field of icebergs. Knowing the diesel-powered sub will have to surface within 24 hours to replenish its air and run its engines to recharge its batteries, he plays a waiting game. The crew never complains, but Potter is concerned that maintaining such a high level of sustained vigilance is dangerous and suggests measures for easing it, all of which Finlander dismisses out of hand.

Munceford is ostensibly aboard to photograph life on a Navy destroyer, but his real interest is the outspoken Finlander, who stood out in the US military for publicly insisting more force had been called for in the recent Cuban Missile Crisis. When Munceford asks Finlander if this is why, though he gets results and has a loyal crew, he was recently passed over for promotion to admiral, Finlander becomes hostile and accuses Munceford of misinterpreting the facts. When challenged how far he would go in waging his personal Cold War he responds that he would go "all the way" to save his country, though after calming down he insists "all the way" doesn't really mean "all the way", and that his current dogged and even aggressive pursuit is just a deterrent.

He seeks permission from his upline command to force the Soviet sub to surface and reveal itself in violation of international law. He is twice told to simply wait. During a round-the-clock general quarters it gives him the slip. Frustration gives way to fury, and obsession to mania.

Finally the Soviet submarine is spotted by the Bedford's lookouts when it pokes its snorkel above the surface, safe again in international waters. It had not been detected running its diesels by the single sonarman Finlander relies on, who became overcome by exhaustion-induced delusions. Schrepke reminds Finlander that his orders are just to escort the sub out of Greenland's waters, which he has already done, but Finlander sends a message ordering the sub to surface and identify itself. When the order is ignored, Finlander runs over its snorkel. Schrepke, who has the mindset of the fox and not the hunter, protests that Finlander has cornered the sub (that cannot effectively flee while surfaced, being slower than the destroyer and an easy target for its numerous weapons) and is forcing it to fight. Crazed, Finlander orders Ralston to arm the ASROC rocket-propelled anti-submarine torpedo system. He reassures the anxious Munceford and Schrepke that he will not fire first, but "if he fires one, I'll fire one" back. The fatigued Ralston just hears "fire one" and launches the rocket.

The ASROC warhead arches its way skyward then descends by parachute right upon the submarine, completely destroying it. Everyone is horrified. However, upon detecting the rocket ignition the sub had launched a spread of four nuclear torpedoes at the Bedford. Although Finlander orders evasive maneuvers and countermeasures, everyone knows the situation is likely hopeless. Finlander silently leaves the bridge, followed by Munceford, hectoring him to do more. The captain looks away sheepishly, and the Bedford and her crew are vaporized in an atomic blast.

== Cast ==
- Richard Widmark as Captain Eric Finlander
- Sidney Poitier as Ben Munceford
- James MacArthur as Ensign Ralston
- Martin Balsam as Lieutenant Commander Chester Potter, M.D.
- Wally Cox as Seaman Merlin Queffle (Sonar)
- Eric Portman as Commodore Wolfgang Schrepke, Bundesmarine
- Michael Kane as Commander Allison, Executive Officer (Bridge)
- Gary Cockrell as Lieutenant Bascombe (C.I.C.)
- Phil Brown as Chief Hospitalman McKinley (Sick Bay)
- Brian Davies as Lieutenant Beckman (Communications)
- Paul Carson as Seaman 1st Class Williams (Communications)
- Edward Bishop as Lieutenant Hacker (Communications)
- Colin Maitland as Seaman Jones (Bridge)
- Roy Stephens as Seaman 2nd Class (C.I.C.)
- George Roubicek as Lieutenant Berger (C.I.C.)
- Donald Sutherland as Hospitalman Nerney (Sick Bay)
- Burnell Tucker as Seaman 1st Class (Bridge)

== Production ==
=== Background ===
The novel The Bedford Incident was inspired by real-life Cold War naval incidents. In August 1957, the USS Gudgeon, commanded by Lt. Cmdr. Norman B. "Buzz" Bessac, was detected by the Soviet Navy outside the port of Vladivostok in the Pacific. Bessac ordered the submarine to make a full stop, hoping to "go quiet and lose" its pursuers. As the Gudgeon descended 700 feet (210 m) below sea level, a 30-hour hold-down lasted as Bessac instructed all non-essential crew members to stay in their bunks. Meanwhile, Bessac raised its radio antenna and sent a message to the US Seventh Fleet headquarters in Japan, requesting for backup. When the Gudgeon finally surfaced, its torpedo tubes were ready to fire. Bessac asked the signalman to send a message in Morse code, identifying the vessel as a US Navy warship. The Soviet ships received the message and allowed the Gudgeon to sail.

In October 1962, at the height of the Cuban Missile Crisis, the Soviet submarine B-59 was pursued in the Atlantic Ocean by the US Navy. When the diesel-powered Soviet vessel failed to surface, destroyers began dropping training depth charges. Unlike in The Bedford Incident, the Americans were not aware that the B-59 was armed with a T-5 nuclear torpedo. The B-59 had been out of contact with Moscow for several days and was running too deep to monitor civilian radio broadcasts. The Soviet captain thought World War III might have started and wanted to launch the weapon, but he was overruled by his flotilla commander, Vasili Arkhipov, who was using the sub as his command vessel. After an argument, it was agreed that the submarine would surface and await orders from Moscow. It was not until after the fall of the Soviet Union that the existence of the T-5 torpedo and how close the world came to nuclear conflict became known.

=== Development ===
In 1963, James B. Harris read the original novel and pursued the film rights; he stated: "I thought that it could make a terrific movie, making a statement that I firmly believe in: That if two nuclear powers have a confrontation, nobody wins." He later learned that Richard Widmark had wanted to acquire the rights and wanted to play the lead role. Through a mutual talent agent, both Harris and Widmark negotiated to co-produce The Bedford Incident, with Widmark cast in the lead role. Harris would make his directorial feature film debut.

Columbia Pictures agreed to finance and distribute the film, but was apprehensive since Harris was a first-time director. Harris had to submit a statement of personal finances to Columbia in order to prove that he could provide additional financing should the film exceed its $1.75 million budget. Aside from Widmark, the cast included Sidney Poitier, Martin Balsam, James MacArthur, Eric Portman, and Wally Cox. Both Harris and Widmark had asked Poitier to be cast as the ship's medical officer, Lieutenant Commander Chester Potter. However, at Poitier's request, he asked to be cast as Ben Munceford, the civilian photojournalist aboard the Navy submarine destroyer. Most notably, Poitier's role in the film was his first in his career where his character's race is never mentioned.

Principal photography began in November 1964 at the Shepperton Studios in London. According to The New York Times, the Pentagon declined to loan military vessels for the production due to tightened "acceptability standards" following unfavorable depictions of the US military in Dr. Strangelove and Seven Days in May (1964).

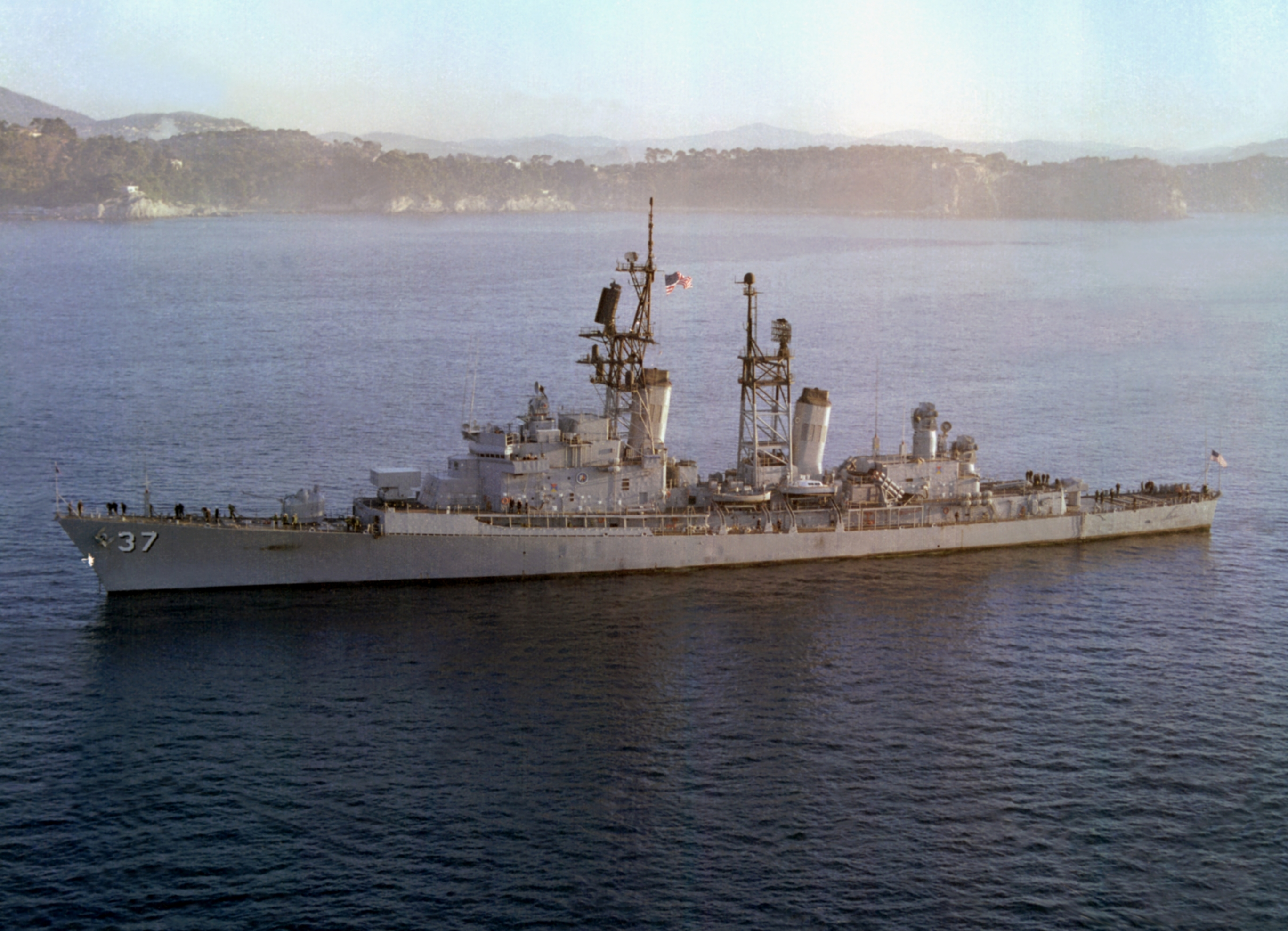
A Farragut class destroyer, the model for USS Bedford

The opening shots of the fictitious guided missile destroyer USS Bedford were not of a United States Navy Farragut-class destroyer but a British Type 15 frigate, HMS Wakeful, as the Department of Defense objected to how the Navy was portrayed in the screenplay and declined to cooperate with the film's production. Interior scenes were filmed in HMS Troubridge, another Type 15 frigate. The class's novel, forward-sloping bridge windows can be seen in some shots, as can British military equipment, such as a rack of Lee-Enfield rifles. The rest was filmed, and the film itself produced, at Shepperton Studios in the United Kingdom. There, a large model of the Bedford was filmed in a tank. The vessel portraying a Soviet intelligence ship masquerading as a fishing trawler has the name "Novo Sibursk", written on the hull at the bow in the Latin alphabet (rather than the Russian language's Cyrillic alphabet), where "Novosibirsk" would have been a more accurate rendering even in the wrong alphabet.

== Reception ==
Arthur D. Murphy Variety called The Bedford Incident "an excellent contemporary sea drama based on a little-known but day-to-day reality of the Cold War, the monitoring of Russian submarine activity by US Navy destroyers. The production, made at England's Shepperton Studios, has salty scripting and solid performances, including one of the finest in Widmark's career." Bosley Crowther of The New York Times felt "the whole thing transcends plausibility—for a moderately wised-up viewer, at least—because of its gross exaggeration of a highly improbable episode [...] the blame for this climactic blooper must be lodged against James Poe, who wrote the script from a novel by Mark Rascovich."

Philip K. Scheuer of the Los Angeles Times called Harris's direction "tight-knit" and felt the performances were "shipshape", but felt the "incessant yakety-yak engenders a certain degree of deafness after a while. Anyhow, it did with me. The climax is a stunner–though not one to send you out happily whistling the tune." The Chicago Tribune concluded in their review: "It's an engrossing sea story with a script which neither condescends nor clowns." Peter Freedman of Radio Times called the film a "superior Cold War sea drama-cum-chase movie" which "explores similar nuclear fears to Kubrick's Dr Strangelove, but in more sober fashion."

On the review aggregator website Rotten Tomatoes, 87% of 15 critics' reviews are positive.

== See also ==
- On the Beach – a 1959 film about the last American submarine following a global nuclear war
- Fail Safe – a 1964 film concerning the accidental launch of a nuclear first strike by the United States Air Force
- Dr Strangelove – a 1964 political satire black comedy film about nuclear war

== Bibliography ==
- Whitfield, Stephen (1996). The Culture of the Cold War. Baltimore: Johns Hopkins University Press. ISBN 978-0-8018-5195-7.
- Maloney, Sean M (2020). Deconstructing Dr. Strangelove: The Secret History of Nuclear War Films. Lincoln: University of Nebraska Press. ISBN 978-1-64012-351-9.
- Strada, Michael; Troper, Harold (1997). Friend Or Foe?: Russians in American Film and Foreign Policy, 1933-1991. Lanham: Scarecrow Press. ISBN 0-8108-3245-3.
