= Lachiewicz–Sibley syndrome =

- Specialty: Medical genetics

Lachiewicz–Sibley syndrome is a rare autosomal dominant disorder characterized by preauricular pits and renal disease. Persons with this disease may have hypoplasic kidneys or proteinuria. This disease was first described in a Caucasian family of British and Irish descent that emigrated to Ohio in the 19th century before settling in Nebraska. Many of the members of this family still live in Nebraska, although the relatives are now scattered throughout the country.

Unlike branchio-oto-renal (BOR) syndrome, Lachiewicz–Sibley syndrome is characterized by only preauricular pitting and renal disease. Persons with BOR syndrome also present with hearing loss, branchial fistulas or cysts, malformed ears, and lacrimal stenosis. Other anomalies in BOR syndrome may include a long narrow face, a deep overbite, and facial paralysis. It was characterized in 1985.

== See also ==
- Branchio-oto-renal syndrome
