= Shoestring (TV series) =

British TV detective drama series (1979–1980)

- DVD cover
- Genre: Detective fiction
- Created by: Robert Banks Stewart; Richard Harris
- Written by: See list of episodes
- Directed by: See list of episodes
- Starring: Trevor Eve; Michael Medwin; Doran Godwin; Liz Crowther
- Composer: George Fenton
- Country of origin: United Kingdom
- Original language: English
- No. of series: 2
- No. of episodes: 21

Production
- Producer: Robert Banks Stewart
- Cinematography: John Baker; Peter Burton; Keith Champan
- Running time: 50 minutes
- Production company: BBC Studios

Original release
- Network: BBC1
- Release: 30 September 1979 – 21 December 1980

Shoestring is a British detective fiction drama series, set in an unnamed city in the West of England and filmed in Bristol, featuring the down-at-heel private detective Eddie Shoestring (Trevor Eve), who presents his own show on Radio West, a local radio station. Broadcast on BBC1, the programme lasted for two series, between 30 September 1979 and 21 December 1980, comprising a total of 21 episodes. After the second series was broadcast Eve decided not to return to the role, as he "wanted to diversify into theatre roles". Subsequently, the production team began taking popular elements of the series and revising them for a new series, Bergerac, set in Jersey and first shown in 1981. BBC Books published two novels written by Paul Ableman, Shoestring (1979) and Shoestring's Finest Hour (1980).

Shoestring was repeated on terrestrial television in January 2002, with 14 of the 21 episodes shown on daytime BBC One. However, due to scheduling, between six and eight minutes of footage was cut from every episode.

The first series was originally scheduled to be released on DVD in its entirety by DD Home Entertainment in 2005, but the idea was abandoned because of the high cost of music rights licensing. In 2011 2|Entertain confirmed it had picked up the rights to release the series on DVD and announced the first series would be released on 17 October 2011. They announced that all 11 episodes would be uncut except for one minor music replacement, meaning that it would be the first time the series had been seen uncut since UK Gold repeats of the series in the early 1990s. This DVD was later deleted.

In June 2017, Network Distribution announced that a DVD box set of both series was planned for release on 16 October 2017 and would contain a book on the series written by Andrew Pixley. The complete series (minus the book) has since been re-issued on the BBC label in September 2024.

== Synopsis ==
Eddie Shoestring is a former computer expert who has resigned after suffering a nervous breakdown. In those days computers were large bulky machines with open reel tape drives creating considerable noise. In one episode Shoestring visits such a computer room and finds it mentally distressing. Following a period of convalescence, Shoestring has turned his hand to private detective work. His landlady, barrister Erica Bayliss, arranges for him to investigate a potential scandal involving an entertainer who works for the local Radio West.

After sorting the matter out, Shoestring visits Radio West to brief his client who has just chaired an unsuccessful planning meeting to come up with new programme ideas. Inspired by a sketch of herself made by Shoestring, Radio West's receptionist Sonia proposes that he be hired as the station's "private ear" to present a weekly broadcast entitled 'The Private Ear of Eddie Shoestring', in which members of the public are offered his services in order to investigate cases affecting them, such as disappearances or the unsolved deaths of loved ones. At first, Shoestring drives an old Hillman Hunter, but when this is destroyed, he purchases a bright orange Ford Cortina estate. The final episode was a Christmas special. The episode "Find The Lady" featured singer Toyah Willcox and allowed her to perform some of her own material in character. The building in Welsh Back utilised to portray the Radio West premises was owned by the GPO at the time, and is now a block of flats, Riverside House.

Almost a year after the show finished, Bristol's first independent radio station was started under the name of Radio West on 27 October 1981, broadcasting on 238 metres medium wave - almost the same wavelength as the 237 metres ascribed to Radio West in the show. In 2022, Shoestring was the subject of 'Eddie Shoestring's Bristol', a documentary presented by Xander Brett for Burst Radio.

== Cast ==
- Trevor Eve as Eddie Shoestring – A "Private Ear" for Radio West, who investigates cases for the public free of charge. He is sometimes called "Bootlace", and is nearly always scruffy and dishevelled in his appearance.
- Michael Medwin as Don Satchley – The owner of Radio West. He sometimes finds that Shoestring's cases conflict with his commercial interests.
- Doran Godwin as Erica Bayliss – Shoestring's landlady. As a barrister, she sometimes provides legal advice for the cases he is investigating. There are also some hints of a romance between the pair.
- Liz Crowther as Sonia – The receptionist at Radio West.

=== Supporting cast ===
- Colin Maitland as Pete – A sound engineer and studio assistant at Radio West (eight episodes)
- Jeanna L'Etsy as Liz (four episodes)
- Julian Littman as Vincent Dinsdale (four episodes)
- John Vine as Karl Winning – A DJ and announcer at Radio West (three episodes)
- Stewart Bevan as Paul – A DJ and presenter at Radio West (three episodes)
- Alan David as Ben Fischer (two episodes)
- Toyah Willcox as Toola (one episode, December 1979)

== Episodes ==
=== Series 1 (1979) ===
No. overall	No. in series	Title	Directed by	Written by	Original release date
1	1	"Private Ear"	Douglas Camfield	Robert Banks Stewart and Richard Harris	30 September 1979
Call-girl Sarah Marshall kills herself on a beach, after stealing the car belonging to a man she had tried to contact – David Carn, a popular DJ with Bristol radio station Radio West.
2	2	"Knock for Knock"	Roger Tucker	Bob Baker	7 October 1979
Eddie assists Claire Stevens, whose husband was killed in a hit and run by drivers of a white van. A tip-off leads Eddie to a duo of young fraudsters who go 'on the knock', buying antique furniture from gullible elderly people at less than the real value.
3	3	"Higher Ground"	Marek Kanievska	Dave Humphries	14 October 1979
Higher Ground, a boarding school run by strict ex-Army major Hansford and his wife Jean, is being plagued by sadistic, sick stunts – but Hansford refuses to call in the police, so Jean employs Eddie.
4	4	"An Uncertain Circle"	Mike Vardy	"Robert Bennett" (pseudonym for Robert Banks Stewart)	21 October 1979
Marion Cutler asks Eddie to trace her boyfriend, Nick Forrest, who has disappeared from the coastal caravan park where he was staying, though Steve the owner denies all knowledge of Forrest.
5	5	"Listen to Me"	Peter Smith	Terence Feely	28 October 1979
Adamant that her husband Harry was wrongly jailed for killing a shop assistant during a jeweller's shop robbery, Mel Shepherd threatens to jump from Radio West's roof – unless Eddie finds the real murderer.
6	6	"Nine Tenths of the Law"	Marek Kanievska	Peter Miller	4 November 1979
Mary Phillips asks for Eddie's help after her ex-husband Dennis snatches their little daughter June, a ward of court, with a view to taking her back to Australia with him.
7	7	"The Link-Up"	Douglas Camfield	Peter King	11 November 1979
After Molly Tasker, director of a local women's refuge, accuses Radio West of ignoring domestic violence, Eddie investigates why the late Jackie Craig, whose wife is in the hostel, was unaccountably wealthy when he drowned.
8	8	"Stamp Duty"	Martyn Friend	John Kruse	18 November 1979
A stamp dealer, Joss Hargreaves, collapses and dies while he is being bundled into a car by heavies working for Strickland, a corrupt businessman whom Eddie is trying to expose.
9	9	"Find the Lady"	Marek Kanievska	Philip Martin	2 December 1979
Rock singer Toola asks Eddie to dissuade her sacked bass player Mole from his belief that his beauty queen girlfriend Chrissie was killed out of jealousy by the band's manager Malcolm Kenrick.
10	10	"The Partnership"	Paul Ciappessoni	Michael Armstrong	9 December 1979
Sonia, the Radio West receptionist, is concerned for her friend, travel agent Jenny Kelson, whom she sees apparently being threatened by a young man. Eddie photographs and follows him, leading to a remote country house owned by a couple of dog breeders.
11	11	"I’m a Believer"	Mike Vardy	Jim Hawkins	16 December 1979
When Maddy Hopkins joins religious cult the Starshiners, her anxious mother, convinced that the group is out to get her trust fund money from her twenty-first birthday, asks Eddie to investigate.

=== Series 2 (1980) ===
No. overall	No. in series	Title	Directed by	Written by	Original release date
12	1	"Room with a View"	Henry Herbert	"Robert Bennett" (Robert Banks Stewart)	5 October 1980
Retired music hall singer Lettie Ross witnesses a murder in the empty house opposite her flat but, when the police and her daughter are dismissive, she calls in Eddie.
13	2	"The Teddy Bears’ Nightmare"	Martin Campbell	Leslie Darbon	12 October 1980
Out fishing, Don sees a thief rob a young couple of the woman's handbag, but the couple themselves flee and fail to report the theft. Don retrieves the bag and Eddie traces it to Christine Page, who says that she and her married lover Ken Bailey, are being blackmailed.
14	3	"Mocking Bird"	Ben Bolt	"William Hood" (pseudonym for Robert Holmes)	19 October 1980
Young women are being mugged around the city and the perpetrator, a caller with an Ulster accent, keeps ringing Eddie and taunting him for his inability to catch him. The police are called in but smug inspector Healey is little help.
15	4	"The Mayfly Dance"	Henry Herbert	Bill Craig	26 October 1980
Don asks Eddie to locate Jody Brent, a once popular singer whose big hit 'Lazy Daisy' is enjoying a revival on Radio West's easy listening show. Though Miriam, Jody's manager, claims he is in America, Eddie hears that he is living in Wales in seclusion.
16	5	"The Farmer Had a Wife"	Paul Ciappessoni	"William Hood" (Robert Holmes)	2 November 1980
To encourage more human interest stories, Don persuades Eddie to help a watercress farmer, David Mortimer, whose wife Rosemary has disappeared for a second time and is being accused by other villagers of murdering her, to try to locate her.
17	6	"Utmost Good Faith"	Marek Kanievska	Andrew Payne	9 November 1980
After her debt-ridden husband Tim kills himself, Mary Reynolds asks Eddie's help in discovering why her credit facilities have been stopped when the debt concerned was twelve years earlier and apparently cancelled.
18	7	"Looking for Mr Wright"	Laurence Moody	"Robert Bennett" (Paula Milne & Robert Banks Stewart)	16 November 1980
Erica's secretary Lois meets the charming Clive Wright through a dating agency, but he disappears while they are in a restaurant, and the restaurant staff and dating agency workers are equally unhelpful as to whether he even existed.
19	8	"Another Man’s Castle"	Douglas Camfield	Dave Humphries	7 December 1980
While Philip and Diana Hoskens are moving house, the van containing all their furniture is stolen by a shady landlord, Terry Bowen, to furnish a property he is letting to a young couple.
20	9	"Where Was I?"	Jeremy Summers	Peter Miller	14 December 1980
Family man Keith Amery goes camping on the moors alone and sees a helicopter land, but then he falls and hits his head, bringing on amnesia. On the advice of Eddie's old psychiatrist Keith's wife asks Eddie to help Keith to recall events.
21	10	"The Dangerous Game"	Ben Bolt	Chris Boucher	21 December 1980
Pete Johnson, a market trader who deals in stolen goods, gives his little son Mike a birthday present, an electric racing game called Lunar Race 2000 but it is faulty and blows up, leading to the boy's admission to hospital.

== Novels ==
Two novels were published to tie-in with the series. Both were written by Paul Ableman. The first, simply titled Shoestring (1979) was an extended adaptation of the first episode. The first part of the novel gives details of Eddie's breakdown, treatment, and becoming a detective. This was followed by Shoestring's Finest Hour (1980). This was an original novel, not based on an episode, in which Eddie finds himself a suspect in a murder, and has to discover the real culprit.

== Proposed film ==
In 1980, The Rank Organisation announced it would make a feature film version, but soon after, they decided to cut back on all cinema production and no film was produced.
