= During One Night =

1961 British film by Sidney J. Furie

- Lobby card
- Directed by: Sidney J. Furie
- Written by: Sidney J. Furie
- Produced by: Sidney J. Furie
- Starring: Don Borisenko; Susan Hampshire
- Cinematography: Norman Warwick
- Edited by: Antony Gibbs
- Music by: Bill McGuffie
- Production company: Galaworldfilm Production Ltd.
- Distributed by: Gala Film Distributors (UK)
- Release date: 1 December 1961
- Running time: 84 minutes
- Country: United Kingdom
- Language: English
- Budget: £50,000

During One Night (also known as Night of Passion) is a 1961 British drama film, directed and written by Sidney J. Furie and starring Don Borisenko and Susan Hampshire. It was Walton Studios' last production.

== Plot ==
David is a Captain in the American Airforce, based in the south of England during the Second World War. His co-pilot Mike is seriously injured during a mission and, rendered impotent by his injuries, commits suicide. David sets out on a night of potential passion, wishing to ensure that he does not die a virgin before his next and final flying mission the following day.

He goes with a prostitute, but cannot perform. He meets an attractive young woman at a dance, but when she takes him home her male accomplices mug him, stealing his money. He gets drunk in a country pub and meets the landlady's daughter Jean, who is kind and sympathetic to him. Hiding from the Military Police in a barn, their attempt at love-making fails.

Distraught, David attempts to get himself shot dead by the military policemen, but the situation is defused by a Military Chaplain. David returns to the pub to say goodbye to Jean, and they consummate their love.

== Cast ==
- Don Borisenko as David
- Susan Hampshire as Jean
- Sean Sullivan as Major
- Joy Webster as prostitute
- Graydon Gould as Mike
- Tom Busby as Sam
- Alan Gibson as Harry
- Barbara Ogilvie as mother
- Jackie Collins as girl
- Michael Golden as constable
- Roy Stephens as driver
- Colin Maitland as gunner
- Pamela Barney as nurse
- John Bloomfield as M.P. Sergeant
- Sean McCan as M.P.
- Barry McClean as tough

== Critical reception ==
The Monthly Film Bulletin wrote: "This is a laboriously sincere little tale, outmoded in just about every conceivable way. ... Don Borisenko's imitation Brando performance would have seemed gratuitous five years ago; and the film's determination to eschew obvious sensationalism leads to the other extreme and the kind of grey, almost comatose tedium one associates with wartime propaganda tracts on sexual hygiene. And yet, despite crude handling and incoherent expression, the piece has undeniable innocence, integrity and – more important here – a grain of truth at the core. In this respect Susan Hampshire's simple account of Jean, the girl willing to give herself to the frightened boy if it will help him solve his problems, is of great assistance."

Kine Weekly wrote: "The picture ... contains one torrid scene in a whore's bedroom, but once David and Jean meet, the seamy and the sensational are discarded and significant drama emerges. Don Borisenko wins much sympathy as David, a youth obsessed by the thought that he might die in battle before he has established his manhood, Susan Hampshire touches the heart as Jean, the girl willing to sacrifice her honour so that David's problem can be solved, and Sean Sullivan registers as the broadminded Major. ... The director handles the early situations a little crudely, but tackles subsequent ones with integrity and showmanship"
