= The War Lover =

1962 film by Philip Leacock

- American cinema poster
- Directed by: Philip Leacock
- Screenplay by: Howard Koch
- Based on: The War Lover; 1959 novel by John Hersey
- Produced by: Arthur Hornblow Jr.
- Starring: Steve McQueen; Robert Wagner; Shirley Anne Field
- Cinematography: Robert Huke
- Edited by: Gordon Hales
- Music by: Richard Addinsell
- Color process: Black and white
- Production company: Columbia British Productions
- Distributed by: Columbia Pictures
- Release date: September 1962 (UK)
- Running time: 106 minutes
- Country: United Kingdom
- Language: English
- Box office: $1.2 million (US/Canada)

The War Lover is a 1962 British war film directed by Philip Leacock and written by Howard Koch, loosely based on the 1959 novel by John Hersey, altering the names of characters and events but retaining its basic framework. It stars Steve McQueen, Robert Wagner and Shirley Anne Field.

The war itself is not the most important element of the film. Instead, it focuses on the character of Captain Buzz Rickson and his determination to serve himself and get what he wants – in the process antagonising everyone.

== Plot ==
Capt. Buzz Rickson commands a B-17 bomber in Britain during World War II. On a mission over Germany, Rickson's commanding officer, Col. Emmet, aborts the bomber group's attack due to cloud cover. Instead of obeying his superior, Rickson leads his squadron under the clouds and completes the mission. He believes Emmet will tolerate his insubordination because he's the group's best pilot. And although the group's flight surgeon is uncertain whether Rickson is hero or psychopath, Rickson's crew, especially his co-pilot, Lt. Ed Bolland, trust his intuitive flying skills.

Between missions, Rickson and Bolland meet a young Englishwoman, Daphne Caldwell. Although she is attracted to both pilots, she chooses Bolland. They soon fall in love. Meanwhile, Bolland becomes increasingly disillusioned with Rickson. The crew's popular navigator, Lt. Marty Lynch, is pressured to transfer to another crew after he questions Rickson's behaviour. Lynch even tells Bolland, "Give Rickson a bomber and a machine gun, and he could be on either side." Lynch is soon killed in action. Bolland takes it hard and blames Rickson. Later, while on liberty, Rickson makes a move on Daphne, visiting her in her London flat after Bolland has returned to the base. Daphne rejects his forceful advances, telling him she loves Bolland. (Note: In the novel, Daphne does not say she loves Bolland.)

The next morning, on a mission over Germany, Colonel Emmet's plane is shot down, making Rickson the mission's leader. Rickson's plane drops its bombs on target, but there's a cost. The plane is badly shot up by Messerschmitts, killing “Junior” their ball turret gunner, when a Fighter explodes in front of him. Further, its bomb bay doors are stuck open with one armed bomb still on its rack. As the plane nears the English coastline, an air-sea rescue team is contacted and the crew bails out – all except Rickson, who is determined to bring the bomber back to base. Instead, he crashes into the white cliffs on the Kent coast. Afterwards, Bolland reports Rickson's death to Daphne in Cambridge. She concludes, "It's what he always wanted." The lovers walk away together.

== Cast ==
- Steve McQueen as 'Buzz' / Buzz Rickson
- Robert Wagner as 'Bo' / Ed Bolland
- Shirley Anne Field as Daphne
- Gary Cockrell as Lynch: Crew of 'The Body'
- Michael Crawford as Junior' / Junior Sailen: Crew of 'The Body'
- Bill Edwards as Brindt: Crew of 'The Body'
- Chuck Julian as Lamb: Crew of 'The Body'
- Robert Easton as Handown: Crew of 'The Body'
- Al Waxman as Prien: Crew of 'The Body'
- Tom Busby as Farr: Crew of 'The Body'
- George Sperdakos as Bragliani: Crew of 'The Body'
- Bob Kanter as Haverstraw: Crew of 'The Body'
- Jerry Stovin as Emmet
- Ed Bishop as Vogt (as Edward Bishop)
- Richard Leech as Murika
- Bernard Braden as Randall
- Sean Kelly as Woodman
- Charles De Temple as Braddock
- Neil McCallum as Sully
- Viera as Singer
- Justine Lord as Street Girl
- Louise Dunn as Hazel
- Arthur Hewlett as Vicar

== Production ==
The War Lover was filmed in Britain at RAF Bovingdon in Hertfordshire, RAF Manston in Kent, around Cambridgeshire (including in the grounds of King's College, Cambridge), and at Shepperton Studios in Surrey.

Shirley Ann Field says she turned down the lead in A Kind of Loving to make the movie. "I chose the option to go to Hollywood, who wouldn't?... Although I have to say I don't think director Philip Leacock was strong enough... I just think it could have been better." Field's casting was announced in July 1961.

Three Boeing B-17 Flying Fortress bombers formed the main aerial component in the film, and were composed of one B-17G and two postwar PB-1W Coast Guard rescue aircraft located in the United States. After extensive modifications, the three warbirds flew the arduous transatlantic crossing to Britain. Martin Caidin, who would later write the novels on which the TV series The Six Million Dollar Man and the film Marooned were based, was one of the pilots who flew the B-17s for the film. Caidin chronicled the adventures of the crossing in the book Everything But The Flak.

The War Lover was shot in 1961 and released in the United States on 25 October 1962. The film opened in London in June 1963. Some short but rare footage of actual air combat is included – especially the attacking Messerschmitt Bf 109G armed with 20 mm cannon firing at the B-17s. The film also makes use of the crash landing footage from the 1949 film Twelve O'Clock High.

Mike Reilly, a stuntman doubling for Robert Wagner, was killed during the production of The War Lover when he fell to his death in a parachuting accident.

In 2003, Sony Pictures colourised the film, but the colour version has yet to be released on home video.

== Reception ==
The War Lover was unfavourably compared to other wartime aviation epics like Twelve O'Clock High (1949). Bosley Crowther of The New York Times focused on the lack of interesting characters in the film. "But the fellows who sit in the cockpit of the one plane on which the actions center are a dull pair and are rendered even duller by poor acting and weak direction. Steve McQueen is the emotionally-mixed-up pilot who tries to steal his co-pilot's girl. Robert Wagner is the co-pilot and Shirley Anne Fields is the girl. Altogether they make what at best is an average drama of love and jealousy into a small and tepid expose of one man's absurd cantankerousness."

In a similar vein, the review of The War Lover in Variety noted, "...the central character emerges more of an unappealing symbol than a sympathetic flesh-and-blood portrait.... The scenario seems reluctant to come to grips with the issue of this character's unique personality – a 'war lover' whose exaggerated shell of heroic masculinity covers up a psychopathic inability to love or enjoy normal relationships with women."
