= The Victors (1963 film) =

1963 US film directed by Carl Foreman

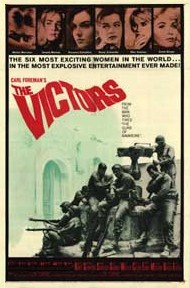
- Theatrical release poster
- Directed by: Carl Foreman
- Written by: Carl Foreman
- Based on: the novel The Human Kind by Alexander Baron
- Produced by: Carl Foreman
- Starring: Vincent Edwards; Albert Finney; George Hamilton; Melina Mercouri; Jeanne Moreau; George Peppard; Maurice Ronet; Rosanna Schiaffino; Romy Schneider; Elke Sommer; Eli Wallach and Michael Callan; Peter Fonda; James Mitchum; Senta Berger
- Cinematography: Christopher Challis B.S.C.
- Edited by: Alan Osbiston
- Music by: Sol Kaplan (composed and conducted by)
- Color process: Black and white
- Production companies: A Highroad– Open Road Presentation
- Distributed by: Columbia Pictures
- Release dates: 18 November 1963 (London-Royal Premiere); 19 November 1963 (United Kingdom); 19 December 1963 (United States)
- Running time: 153 minutes
- Countries: United Kingdom; United States
- Language: English
- Box office: $2,350,000 (US/ Canada)

The Victors is a 1963 war film written, produced and directed by Carl Foreman. He called it a "personal statement" about the futility of war—both victor and vanquished are losers.

The story follows a group of U.S. soldiers through Europe during the Second World War, from Britain in 1942, through the fierce fighting in Italy and the invasion of Normandy, to the uneasy peace of occupied Berlin. It is adapted from a collection of short stories called The Human Kind by English author Alexander Baron, based upon his own wartime experiences. The British characters were changed to Americans in order to appeal to American audiences.

The Victors features an all-star cast with fifteen American and European leading players, including six actresses whose photographs appear on the posters with the caption, "the six most exciting women in the world... in the most explosive entertainment ever made!" — Melina Mercouri from Greece, Jeanne Moreau from France, Rosanna Schiaffino from Italy, Romy Schneider from Austria, Elke Sommer from Germany and Senta Berger from Austria.

== Plot ==
The film consists of a linked series of self-contained vignettes.

A U.S. Army infantry squad enters a small town in Sicily. Sergeant Craig battles to stop his men from looting while Baker strikes up a relationship with Maria, a young mother whose soldier husband is missing. They talk to a Sikh soldier who is lonely and misses his children.

A diverse group of Allied soldiers intermingles in a bar. Four white American soldiers arrive, and one announce they are going "coon huntin'" tonight while brandishing a switchblade. The group assaults two black American soldiers, and flee when Military Police (MPs) arrive. Corporal Trower, assisting one of the black G.I.s, hides as the MPs escort the black victims. The Italian woman who owns the bar seems unphased by the goings on, but asks Trower why Americans would fight among themselves.

The squad is sent to France. Craig enters a nice home that might billet American officers and spends the night with woman who owns the home. She has just survived a night of bombing and Craig is able to comfort the terrified woman.

The squad participates in the liberation of a concentration camp. In Ostend, Trower becomes infatuated with Regine, a violinist at a bar. He walks her home, they kiss, and arrange to meet again. The next time he sees her at the bar she's working for a pimp, Eldridge, who tells Trower that she rents by the hour.

A truckload of GIs is chosen out of a convoy to witness the execution by firing squad of a deserter in a snow-covered field near a chateau at Sainte-Marie-aux-Mines on Christmas Eve.

Chase become involved with Magda, a Polish woman who suggests he desert and join her in the black market. He refuses and returns to the front in the rain, where he's wounded in the leg.

A newcomer to the squad, a misfit named Weaver, adopts a dog against regulations, and it told that they can't take dogs when they redeploy to the front. Weaver feeds the dog anyway, and is kicked out of his squad's tent. When the unit moves out, Grogan, tells Weaver to call his dog. Thinking the others have changed their minds about taking him, Weaver calls the dog and Grogan shoots it dead.

Chase is released from hospital in England, and is invited by Dennis, a civilian, to join his family for tea. The pleasant interlude is followed by a hospital visit to Craig, who has lost most of his face.

The war in Europe ends. In 1946 Trower is still in the Army and stationed in Berlin. He is in love with Helga, a young German woman who was raped by the Russians during and after the Battle of Berlin. Trower brings her parents imported goods from the PX (military Post Exchange). Helga's sister, Trudi, has lost favor with her parents because she has taken a Russian officer as a lover. She flaunts an expensive fur coat from him and explains to Trower that without the Russian her parents would be living outdoors. Trower spends the night with Helga and encounters a drunken Russian soldier when returning to his base. He askishow many women he's raped and the two men pull out knives and stab each other to death. As the camera pulls back to reveal seemingly endless ruins, the position of the Allied soldiers' bodies suggests the letter 'V' for Victory.

== Cast ==
Starring in alphabetical order

- Vincent Edwards as Baker
- Albert Finney as Russian soldier
- George Hamilton as Trower
- Melina Mercouri as Magda
- Jeanne Moreau as Frenchwoman
- George Peppard as Chase
- Maurice Ronet as French lieutenant
- Rosanna Schiaffino as Maria
- Romy Schneider as Regine
- Elke Sommer as Helga Metzger
- Eli Wallach as Craig
- and Michael Callan as Eldridge

Co-Starring

- Peter Fonda as Weaver
- Jim Mitchum as Grogan
- Senta Berger as Trudi Metzger

With

- Albert Lieven as Metzger
- Mervyn Johns as Dennis
- Tutte Lemkow as Sikh soldier
- John Crawford as Captain
- Peter Vaughan as Policeman
- George Mikell as Russian sentry
- Alf Kjellin as Priest
- Russ Titus
- Alan Barnes as Tom
- John Rogers as British soldier
- Marianne Deeming as Frau Metzger
- Sean Kelly as Giggling Sergeant
- Patrick Jordan as Tank sergeant
- James Chase as Condemned soldier
- Mickey Knox
- Peter Arne
- Malya Nappi as Barmaid
- Veite Bethke
- Milo Sperber as Camp prisoner
- George Roubicek as Russian sentry

The Squad

- Riggs O'Hara
- Charles De Temple
- Al Waxman
- Tom Busby
- Robert Nichols
- Graydon Gould
- Larry Caringi
- Ian Hughes
- Anthony McBride

== Music ==
The soundtrack includes:

- "March of the Victors" • "Sweet Talk" • "No Other Man" by Sol Kaplan • Freddy Douglass
- "My Special Dream" by Sol Kaplan • Freddy Douglass • Howard Greenfield
- "Does Goodnight Mean Goodby?" by Howard Greenfield • Jack Keller • Gerry Goffin

== Production ==
=== Writing ===
The film is based on the 1953 book The Human Kind, the third in a trilogy of autobiographical war works by Alexander Baron, after From the City, From the Plough and There's No Home. The Human Kind was a series of autobiographical notes and sketches which covered the war from 1939 to 1945, with an epilogue in Korea. He has been called "an ambitious collection of vignettes pitched between fiction and autobiography, short story and novel, which took pitiless stock of what the war had done to people and their sense of goodness or hope, political hope especially."

=== Pre-production ===
The film rights were bought by Carl Foreman. In May 1957, he announced a slate of productions he wanted to produce under a deal with Columbia in England, including an adaptation of The Human Kind. The deal was for four films over three years, with a budget of $8–10 million. He called Human Kind a "series of vignettes of the early days of the blitz in England."

In 1960, Foreman announced The Human Kind would follow his production of The Guns of Navarone. Foreman's intention was to "select several of the stories, adapt them to the screen and make one overall drama out of the kaleidoscopic collection." Foreman also said he intended to make his directorial debut with the movie.

In August 1961, Foreman said the project would be titled The Victors as he felt the theme of the book was that in war the winners are also the losers. In February 1962, Foreman arrived in Los Angeles to cast the movie.

"It will be controversial and may well shock people," said Foreman in August 1962, just as filming began. "But it represents a deeply personal feeling I have about war and specifically heroism. People are very capable of coming up with heroism when it is necessary - but it's not a game anymore. What I resent is the need for heroism in warfare."

=== Casting ===
Sophia Loren and Simone Signoret were originally cast, but dropped out and were replaced by Jeanne Moreau and Rosanna Schiaffino. Columbia contract player Michael Callan had a small role.

=== Filming ===
The production began 7 August 1962, first in England, then Italy and France, then the unit returned to England. Filming took place in Sweden, France, Italy and England.

Mercouri admitted in her memoirs that "I gave Carl Foreman a hard time" during the shoot but said this was because she was physically unwell.

Saul Bass created the opening montage and title sequence that covers European history from the First World War to the Battle of Britain in the Second World War. Bass's edit of historical footage in The Victors explicitly argues that the failures of World War I and its aftermath directly resulted in the rise of Fascism and World War II. Bass had previously gathered together much of the newsreel material for similar historical montages used in The Four Horsemen of the Apocalypse (1962).

== Release ==
The film disappointed at the box office. George Hamilton argued it "was way too dark, foreshadowing the great paranoid movies of the later sixties, ahead of the bad times that seemed to begin with the Kennedy assassination."

The Victors was cut by about 20 minutes within a few weeks of opening. The version in circulation is 154 minutes (see Leonard Maltin's Movie & Video Guide).

Among the sequences cut was one where an 11-year-old boy, Jean Pierre, propositions the American soldiers to exchange sex for food money. The Hollywood Production Code, also known as the Hays Code, insisted that several scenes be deleted. While the Code had been gradually liberalised in the 1950s-early 1960s, homosexuality was still something that could only be, vaguely, implied in order to get approval from the Hollywood Production Code and the Catholic Legion of Decency.

American film executives encouraged Foreman to include a nude scene with Elke Sommer, already in the version released in Europe and Britain, when he submitted it for a Production Code seal. This was to be used as a bargaining chip in case of any other objections. Foreman submitted the more modest version of the scene that had been shot for the American market and the film was passed without incident.

=== Reception ===
Filmink wrote "Kind of forgotten today, the movie has scenes of tremendous power and Peppard is excellent (as is co-star George Hamilton)." On the review aggregator website Rotten Tomatoes, 20% of 5 critics' reviews are positive.

== Awards & nominations ==
Peter Fonda was nominated for a Golden Globe for Most Promising Newcomer.

== Paperback ==
In November 1963, Dell Publishing issued a novelization of the screenplay by critic, author and war veteran Milton Shulman. The book's presentation is idiosyncratic, as it is both unabashedly a tie-in edition, yet seems to cautiously sidestep labeling itself an adaptation of the script per se (though within Shulman's sensitively internalized retelling, it is quite faithful to the film's dialogue and structure). Both the cover and title page proclaim "Carl Foreman's The Victors" under which the byline is "by Milton Shulman, based on The Human Kind by Alexander Baron." bypassing mention of the actual screenplay. It is unknown whether Dell bid for the publishing rights and commissioned the novelization, or if Foreman engineered its publication. The latter would seem the more likely, given Foreman's possessive over-the-title billing, and that the short story collection providing the source of the screenplay is itself an established work of fiction. What does seem clear is that Baron himself was approached to write the novelization, and that he declined—possibly because, with the Americanization of the characters, he felt the novel's authorship should have a genuinely American voice—but nonetheless wanted to select the author and supervise. That he did so can be extrapolated from the copyright registration: The copyright is assigned to Baron, with a notation that he engaged Shulman to write the book as a work for hire. The resultant novelization sold well enough to earn at least a second print run, indicated on that identical edition's copyright page, issued in January 1964.
