= SIX5 =

Protein-coding gene in the species Homo sapiens

Identifiers
- Aliases: SIX5, BOR2, DMAHP, SIX homeobox 5
- External IDs: OMIM: 600963; MGI: 106220; GeneCards: SIX5

Gene location (Human)
Chr.	Chromosome 19 (human)
Band	19q13.32	Start	45,764,785 bp
Band	19q13.32	End	45,769,252 bp

Gene location (Mouse)
Chr.	Chromosome 7 (mouse)
Band	7 A3|7 9.46 cM	Start	18,828,519 bp
Band	7 A3|7 9.46 cM	End	18,832,474 bp
RNA expression pattern
Bgee	Human / Mouse (ortholog); Top expressed in: cardiac muscle tissue of right atrium; right uterine tube; right ovary; myocardium of left ventricle; left ovary; parotid gland; canal of the cervix; right coronary artery; left uterine tube; body of uterus / Top expressed in: ascending aorta; genital tubercle; aortic valve; corneal stroma; tail of embryo; cardiac muscle tissue of left ventricle; ventricular zone; molar; Gonadal ridge; male urethra; More reference expression data
BioGPS	n/a
Gene ontology
Molecular function	RNA polymerase II cis-regulatory region sequence-specific DNA binding; DNA binding; sequence-specific DNA binding; protein binding; DNA-binding transcription factor activity, RNA polymerase II-specific; transcription cis-regulatory region binding; DNA-binding transcription activator activity, RNA polymerase II-specific
Cellular component	nucleus; cytoplasm; transcription regulator complex
Biological process	multicellular organism development; negative regulation of cell population proliferation; lens development in camera-type eye; negative regulation of transcription, DNA-templated; regulation of transcription, DNA-templated; transcription, DNA-templated; positive regulation of transcription by RNA polymerase II; spermatid development; negative regulation of skeletal muscle satellite cell proliferation; anatomical structure development
Sources:Amigo / QuickGO
Orthologs
Databases	NCBI: entry; OMA: entry
Species	Human	Mouse
Entrez	147912	20475
Ensembl	ENSG00000177045	ENSMUSG00000040841
UniProt	Q8N196	P70178
RefSeq (mRNA)	NM_175875	NM_011383
RefSeq (protein)	NP_787071	NP_035513
Location (UCSC)	Chr 19: 45.76 – 45.77 Mb	Chr 7: 18.83 – 18.83 Mb
PubMed search
- Wikidata
View/Edit Human	View/Edit Mouse

Homeobox protein SIX5 is a protein that in humans is encoded by the SIX5 gene.
