= James B. Harris =

American screenwriter and filmmaker (born 1928)

- Born: August 3, 1928 (age 98); New York City, United States
- Occupations: Film director; screenwriter; producer
- Years active: 1949–1993

James B. Harris (born August 3, 1928) is an American filmmaker best known for his collaborations with Stanley Kubrick.

Born in Manhattan, Harris studied music at the Juilliard School for a year before he dropped out. He later worked for his father's insurance firm. In 1949, Harris co-founded Flamingo Films with David L. Wolper and Sy Weintraub, which acquired the television licensing rights of shorts and documentaries. He was later drafted into the United States Army Signal Corps (USASC) where he met Alexander Singer. While they filmed a detective short film, Singer introduced Harris to Stanley Kubrick, then a fledging young filmmaker.

In 1955, Harris and Kubrick co-founded their namesake production company, whereby Harris produced The Killing (1956), Paths of Glory (1957), and Lolita (1962). Harris made his directorial debut with the Cold War thriller The Bedford Incident (1965). He also directed the actor James Woods in two films: the prison-guard drama Fast-Walking (1982) and the thriller Cop (1988), based on a James Ellroy novel, which Woods co-produced. Harris also directed the 1993 thriller Boiling Point.

== Early life ==
James B. Harris was born to a Jewish family on August 3, 1928 in Manhattan, New York. He was the second child to Joseph Harris, who worked as an insurance broker, and Sylvia, who had produced Broadway plays. His older sibling was J. Robert Harris. His family relocated to the Jersey Shore until they returned to New York City when he was a junior in high school. There, Harris studied at Columbia Grammar. After his graduation, he attended the Juilliard School as a percussion major, with the intent to become a professional musician.

Harris recalled, "Percussion was one thing, but it included playing actual musical instruments, like xylophone and timpanis, and you also had to have a minor in piano and courses like composition and music dictation... I realized quickly that I was in over my head." Meanwhile, Harris's father placed his son as an office boy for his insurance brokerage firm. He then began working for Essex Universal, a media company owned by his father which financed and distributed theatrical films. By 1949, Harris was working for Realart, which distributed foreign-language films in the United States.

== Career ==
=== 1949–1954: Flamingo Films ===
That same year, in 1949, Harris co-founded Flamingo Films, a motion picture and television distribution company, with his former classmate David L. Wolper and Sy Weintraub, who had been in the U.S. Army with Harris's brother. The venture was financed by Harris's father. Harris traveled across the United States to acquire the television licensing rights with several production companies that had produced short-format documentaries, serials, animation, and educational and travelogue films. In 1951, Flamingo Films licensed the exclusive television rights to the 1948 Superman serial.

In 1950, Harris was drafted into the United States Army Signal Corps (USASC), located at the Astoria Studios on Long Island, which produced military training films. There, he met Alexander Singer, where they both trained as combat photographers. While at the Signal Corps, Harris and Singer borrowed film equipment from the Astoria Studios to film a 15-minute detective film they had scripted. They scheduled a weekend shoot at the Harris' Manhattan apartment, which served as both the production base and setting for the film. Harris was the director while Singer was the cameraman. Harris's cousin was cast in one of the lead roles and James Gaffney, one of their Signal Corps friends, was hired as the editor.

While filming, Singer told Harris of Stanley Kubrick, his former classmate from Taft High School. Singer had previously worked on Kubrick's short documentary Day of the Fight (1951). He invited Kubrick onto the set; Harris recalled: "I was a little nervous because it was like performing in front of someone who was already an established professional. He was telling me about the two short films he had made, Day of the Fight and Flying Padre. He had just completed his first feature film, Fear and Desire, which he had done all by himself." In 1954, Harris was discharged from the Signal Corps Photographic Unit and reintroduced himself to Kubrick in front of 1600 Broadway. Kubrick invited Harris to a screening of his second film, Killer's Kiss (1955).

Since his first meeting, Harris had seen Kubrick's past films and was impressed after he watched Killer's Kiss. He stated, "I was very impressed with this guy. I was very impressed that someone could do it all. It had a beginning, middle, and end. It seemed to be very professional. I thought it was hell of an accomplishment and said, 'This guy is really going to be a great, great director!'" Kubrick remembered Harris's Flamingo Films and asked if he could get Fear and Desire (1953) to be aired on television. They met at the offices of Flamingo Films at 509 Madison Avenue. However, the distribution rights to Fear and Desire could not be cleared as the film's producer Joseph Burstyn had died of a heart attack during a transatlantic flight. From there, the rights were caught in a litigation between Burstyn's estate and the distributor. Afterwards, Harris asked Kubrick what he had planned to direct next. Kubrick replied he had nothing scheduled but had wanted to direct another film. Harris then proposed a business partnership, in which he would acquire literary properties to adapt while Kubrick would handle the creative responsibilities.

=== 1955–1962: Collaborations with Stanley Kubrick ===
==== The Killing ====
In 1955, they formed Harris–Kubrick Pictures Corporation, and opened an office at West 57th Street. Kubrick and Harris considered several literary novels, including Jim Thompson's The Killer Inside Me. Harris then came across the novel Clean Break by Lionel White at the Scribner's bookstore on Fifth Avenue. A novel about a racetrack robbery, Harris had liked that it was told from different perspectives similar to Akira Kurosawa's Rashomon (1950). He handed the book for Kubrick to read. They agreed the book would make for a good film. Harris acquired the film rights for $10,000, beating out United Artists (UA) who had wanted to adapt the novel for Frank Sinatra.

Kubrick broke the novel into scenes, deciding which ones to use for the script. At Kubrick's suggestion, they hired Jim Thompson to write the dialogue. Retitled Day of Violence, Harris and Kubrick met with Max Youngstein for United Artists to propose a three-picture deal. Youngstein agreed in exchange for $200,000 if they could hire a prominent lead actor. Sterling Hayden was Kubrick's first choice, but he was not big enough for UA. Harris financed the budget using $80,000 of his own money and a $50,000 loan from his father.

Principal photography began in late 1955, and Kubrick finished shooting in 24 days as scheduled. Retitled The Killing (1956) at UA's request, the film premiered at the New York City Picturehouse on May 19, 1956 and opened nationwide the next day. It was released as a double feature with Bandido (1956). The film received a positive reception from film critics, but was not a commercial success. After two years in release, The Killing had only earned $30,000, thereby Harris had lost his investment. When Kubrick and Harris sold their share of the film back to UA to finance Lolita (1962), it became profitable.

==== Paths of Glory ====
For their second project, Harris–Kubrick decided to adapt Humphrey Cobb's 1935 novel Paths of Glory. They went to MGM's production head Dore Schary, who had been impressed with The Killing. Schary declined their offer, however, as The Red Badge of Courage (1951) had flopped during its release, telling them: "I'm sorry, I know the book. It's great but not here." Instead, he hired them for $75,000 to select one of their hundreds of optioned properties. They selected Stefan Zweig's 1913 novel The Burning Secret and hired Calder Willingham to write the script. After several months in development, Schary was forced out, and MGM terminated their exclusive contract with Harris–Kubrick when it was discovered they had secretly hired Jim Thompson to adapt Paths of Glory.

Harris and Kubrick had wanted Kirk Douglas to play Colonel Dax, and sent the script to his agent. Impressed with the script, Douglas negotiated with UA to star in The Vikings (1958) unless they agreed to finance Paths of Glory for $850,000. Harris–Kubrick signed a five-picture deal with Douglas's production company Bryna Productions, in which Douglas was paid $350,000. Harris and Kubrick were each paid $20,000 plus a percentage of the profits. The production was filmed entirely in Munich, Germany, beginning on March 20, 1957. Towards the end of filming, Harris had a brief disagreement with Kubrick, who wanted to cast Christiane Harlan as a German girl who nervously sings "The Faithful Hussar" (German: "Der treue Husar") at the end of the film. Harris relented, and the scene remained in the final film.

Paths of Glory premiered in Munich on November 1, 1957 and was later released in the United States on December 20, 1957. Still under contract to Bryna Productions, Harris–Kubrick developed a sitcom starring Ernie Kovacs and optioned Herbert Emerson Wilsons's autobiography, I Stole $16,000,000, but these projects languished in development. In May 1958, Marlon Brando unexpectedly called Kubrick, having seen his last two films, and asked him to direct The Authentic Death of Hendry Jones.

==== Lolita ====
Meanwhile, Calder Willingham suggested that Harris and Kubrick should adapt Vladimir Nabokov's 1955 novel Lolita after he had read it. When Kubrick asked to read Harris's copy, Harris tore the first section of the novel and gave it to Kubrick, who found it fascinating. Later on, Harris–Kubrick acquired the screen rights for $150,000 by selling their shares of The Killing to United Artists. During the summer of 1958, Kubrick had several tumultuous meetings with Brando; by mid-November, Kubrick decided to step down as director before shooting began. Retitled One-Eyed Jacks (1961), Brando took over as director.

Kubrick was asked to direct Spartacus (1960), however, after Kirk Douglas had removed Anthony Mann as the initial director. Harris negotiated with Douglas to waive Lolita (1962) as part of their contractual obligation in exchange to loan out Kubrick for Spartacus on a temporary contract. At the end of 1961, Douglas allowed Harris–Kubrick to buy out their contract from Bryna Productions.

While Kubrick was filming Spartacus, Willingham delivered a first script draft of Lolita. Although Harris had liked it, Kubrick did not approve of Willingham's draft. In August 1959, Harris and Kubrick asked Nabokov to write his own adaptation script of Lolita, but he turned down the offer. In January 1960, they offered Nabokov $40,000 to write the screenplay with an additional $35,000 for final credit. By June 1960, he delivered his first draft of the script, which Kubrick and Harris found too lengthy. Nabokov turned in a shorter version of the script in September 1960, which Kubrick accepted. The final shooting script was heavily revised by Kubrick and Harris in England, but they decided to give Nabokov the sole screenwriter credit.

In New York, Harris secured financial backing from Eliot Hyman of Associated Artists Productions (AAP), which had a British film subsidiary known as Seven Arts UK. As part of the deal, Kubrick was given final cut, and a 50/50 partnership was agreed upon. MGM would handle the publicity and distribution. Filmed in England under the Eady Levy, Lolita featured James Mason, Peter Sellers, Shelley Winters, and newcomer Sue Lyon. On June 13, 1962, Lolita premiered at the Loew's State Theatre in New York. It received mildly positive reviews from film critics and garnered $4.5 million in gross rentals in the United States and Canada.

==== Dissolution of Harris–Kubrick Pictures ====
While filming Lolita, Kubrick became fascinated with the topic of nuclear warfare. Alastair Buchan, head of the Institute for Strategic Studies, recommended he read Peter George's thriller Red Alert (published in the UK as Two Hours to Doom). Kubrick and Harris read the book in October 1961 and began an outline of a screenplay. Harris consulted with George's agent Scott Meredith to learn he had sold the option rights in 1959; when the rights lapsed, Harris purchased them for $3,500.

By February 1962, Harris and Kubrick wrote a first draft under the working title The Delicate Balance of Terror and was envisioned as a serious nuclear thriller. Harris took the script to Eliot Hyman and convinced him to accept it as their second picture under their agreement. After several weeks had passed, Harris received a call from Kubrick, stating he was considering turning Red Alert into a satirical comedy. Harris remembered, "I said to myself, 'I leave him alone for ten minutes and he's going to blow his whole career.'"

The dissolution of Harris–Kubrick has been attributed to several factors. It was believed that Harris and Kubrick held creative disagreements over the tonal direction of Red Alert (later retitled Dr. Strangelove). Harris is said to have favored a straightforward suspense while Kubrick wanted to turn the film into an absurdist satire. Harris indeed launched his own directorial career shortly after with The Bedford Incident (1965), which echoed the serious tone of Peter George's book. Harris denied this claim, however, stating Kubrick encouraged him to become a director. Kubrick apparently told him: "There is no pleasure on Earth like seeing your own rushes." Kubrick's biographer Vincent LoBrutto wrote that Harris had wanted to pursue his own directorial career. Their partnership ended amicably and they remained lifelong friends.

=== 1963–1993: Career as a director ===
==== The Bedford Incident ====
In 1963, Harris read the Cold War thriller novel The Bedford Incident by Mark Rascovich. Simultaneously, Richard Widmark was fascinated with the novel's central character. Each of them pursued the screen rights independently for the novel and Harris optioned them for nearly $100,000 of his own finances. Coincidentally, both men shared the same attorney who, upon learning of Widmark's pursuit, decided to bring his two clients together. They negotiated to co-produce The Bedford Incident, with Widmark cast in the lead role and Harris set to make his directorial feature film debut.

Columbia Pictures agreed to finance and distribute the film, but was apprehensive since Harris was a first-time director. Harris had to submit a statement of personal finances to Columbia in order to prove that he could provide additional financing should the film exceed its $1.75 million budget. Aside from Widmark, the cast included Sidney Poitier, Martin Balsam, James MacArthur, Eric Portman, and Wally Cox. Both Harris and Widmark had asked Poitier to be cast as the ship's medical officer, Lieutenant Commander Chester Potter. At Poitier's request, however, he asked to be cast as Ben Munceford, the civilian photojournalist aboard the Navy submarine destroyer. Initially, the role was not written with a Black actor in mind. Mike Frankovich, the head of Columbia Pictures, pushed for Poitier to have the role, and Harris agreed with no hesitation.

Principal photography began in November 1964 at the Shepperton Studios in London. According to The New York Times, the Pentagon declined to loan military vessels for the production due to tightened "acceptability standards" following unfavorable depictions of the U.S. military in Dr. Strangelove and Seven Days in May (1964).

The Bedford Incident premiered at the Garde Theatre in London on October 11, 1965 and later opened in New York on November 2. Arthur D. Murphy of Variety called the film "an excellent contemporary sea drama based on a little-known but day-to-day reality of the Cold War, the monitoring of Russian submarine activity by US Navy destroyers. The production, made at England's Shepperton Studios, has salty scripting and solid performances, including one of the finest in Widmark's career." Bosley Crowther of The New York Times complimented the performances of the cast, but felt "the whole thing transcends plausibility—for a moderately wised-up viewer, at least—because of its gross exaggeration of a highly improbable episode."

==== Some Call It Loving ====
In November 1965, it was reported that Harris would direct a project titled A Hot Time in the Old Town Tonight with Warren Beatty. By January 1966, Sidney Poitier had been added to the cast and the project was described as "a comedy about automation and leisure life". It was postponed, however, due to Poitier's precommitment with another film. That same month, Harris announced plans to adapt Julian Gloag's 1966 novel Sentence of Life. A year later, in 1967, Harris signed a three-picture deal with CBS Theatrical Films, with plans to produce and direct Best by Far based on the Roger Eddy novel.

By January 1969, Harris's namesake production company had signed a three-picture co-production agreement with American International Pictures (AIP). Their first film under the agreement was a film adaptation of Lay Me Down to Sleep based on John Collier's short story "Sleeping Beauty". Harris explained he had come across Collier's story in the anthology novel Fancies and Goodnights while he was researching Lolita. Retitled Some Call It Loving (1973), Zalman King portrays Robert Troy, a jazz musician, who occupies a baroque mansion overlooking the Pacific with his two girlfriends, Scarlett (Carol White) and Angelica (Veronica Anderson). One day, he purchases Jennifer (Tisa Farrow), a slumbering teenager, at a Sleeping Beauty carnival sideshow and awakens her at his mansion. The film was screened at the Directors' Fortnight during the 1973 Cannes Film Festival.

According to Harris, the film received enthusiastic reviews in France. It was released later in the year in the United States, where the film received harsh reviews. A. H. Weiler of The New York Times gave the film a negative review, stating Harris "has fashioned a rambling, contemporary fable that is merely pretentious." Variety wrote: "Some may call it obtuse and quirky and others insightful in this filling out of a John Collier short story on the pitfalls of ideal love while still remains diffuse and thus needs all the critical pros and cons and knowing sell for best results." Jonathan Rosenbaum, then a critic for Film Comment, however gave the film a positive review; it was later republished in the Autumn 1975 issue of Sight & Sound.

==== Fast-Walking ====
At MGM, Harris developed a film adaptation of Franz Werfel's novel The Forty Days of Musa Dagh, but the project was cancelled due to management changes. Harris was then asked to produce Don Siegel's 1977 film Telefon starring Charles Bronson. While Siegel was filming Telefon, Harris came across Ernest Brawley's 1974 novel The Rap. While writing the script, Harris wrote a first draft that followed the novel, but felt the character of Frank "Fast-Walking" Minniver was the most interesting. He rewrote the script to make him the central role. He offered Siegel the script as his next project, but Siegel declined.

Years later, Harris was invited by Jack Schwartzman to produce films at Lorimar Productions. He showed the script to Schwartzman and David V. Picker, in which they agreed to produce it. Titled Fast-Walking (1982), James Woods portrays the title character, a state prison guard, who arranges to help an imprisoned black activist (Robert Hooks) escape before he can be murdered by other right-wing prisoners. Vincent Canby of The New York Times called the film a "prison melodrama of such consistent, proud witlessness that it deserves mention though not attendance [...] Nothing works."

==== Cop ====
For his next project, Harris came across James Ellroy's crime novel, Blood On The Moon. He acquired the film rights and adapted the script, with James Woods in mind for the lead role. When he was shown the script, Woods agreed to not only star in the film, but to serve as co-producer.

In the film, Woods portrays Sgt. Lloyd Hopkins, a LAPD detective, who pursues a serial killer victimizing women. During the investigation, Hopkins teams with Kathleen McCarthy (portrayed by Lesley Ann Warren), a chain-smoking feminist bookstore owner. Charles Durning, Charles Haid, Raymond J. Barry, and Dennis Stewart appeared in supporting roles. When asked about the film's feminist angle while depicting violence against women, Harris replied: "We don't intend to exploit, or be gratuitous with violence or sex. There will be a certain amount of grit, or criminal life, but within good taste."

Cop was released in the United States on February 5, 1988 to positive reviews. Kevin Thomas of the Los Angeles Times summarized, "Sparked by stunning performances from James Woods and Lesley Ann Warren, Cop becomes the genre film at its best: Its makers know how to use a conventional but sturdy plot to trigger a tough-minded, fast-moving and thoroughly absorbing mystery." Roger Ebert gave the film three stars out of four and praised Woods's performance, calling him the "most engaging and unconventional of leading men, as a brilliant but twisted cop." He later ranked it at number 15 on his list of the 20 best films of 1988.

==== Boiling Point ====
During pre-production of Cops, James Woods showed Harris two of Gerald Petievich's novels, One-Shot Deal and Money Men. Harris was more interested in Money Men and subsequently acquired the screen rights. Woods was not available, however, to star in the film. Harris showed Leonardo De La Fuente the Money Men script at the Cannes Film Festival, who signed Dennis Hopper onto the project. Andy Garcia was considered to star opposite of Hopper, but Wesley Snipes was cast instead.

Produced by the French company Studio Canal Plus, principal photography began in mid-April 1992 and was completed on May 29, 1992. According to Harris, Studio Canal Plus sold the distribution rights to Warner Bros., who re-edited the film to resemble Snipes's earlier action hit, Passenger 57 (1992). He stated, "My picture was not that kind of a movie. It was more cerebral [...] They wanted an action movie, so they changed the name to Boiling Point, they designed the ads that looked like Wesley Snipes was going to blow away the whole police force or the whole criminal world."

Released in April 1993, Boiling Point received negative reviews from film critics. Janet Maslin of The New York Times called the film a "barely tepid police story co-starring Wesley Snipes and Dennis Hopper, cast respectively as a hard-boiled detective and a wily con man" that "isn't much of a showcase for either of its stars." Variety wrote, "Low-key and bland in the extreme, it's strictly for film buffs, although the Snipes name should ensure strong first-week B.O. from action enthusiasts."

Beforehand, Harris optioned the film rights to Ellroy's crime novel The Black Dahlia shortly after it was published in 1987. He completed a script with James Woods in mind for the lead role. He arranged a financing deal with Capella Films, but Harris abandoned the project due to creative differences. It was later produced into a 2006 film directed by Brian De Palma, in which Harris retained a producer's credit.

== Filmography ==
Year	Film	Director	Writer	Producer	Notes
1956	The Killing			Yes	
1957	Paths of Glory			Yes	Also acting cameo as uncredited private during the attack
1962	Lolita			Yes	Also actor as Jack Brewster
1965	The Bedford Incident	Yes		Yes	
1973	Some Call It Loving	Yes	Yes	Yes	
1977	Telefon			Yes	
1982	Fast-Walking	Yes	Yes	Yes	
1988	Cop	Yes	Yes	Yes	
1993	Boiling Point	Yes	Yes	Yes	
2006	The Black Dahlia			Executive	

== Bibliography ==
- Baxter, John (1997). Stanley Kubrick: A Biography. Carroll & Graf. ISBN 978-0-786-70485-9.
- Duncan, Paul (2003). Stanley Kubrick: Visual Poet 1928–1999. Taschen. ISBN 978-3-8228-1592-2.
- Kolker, Robert P.; Abrams, Nathan (2024). Kubrick: An Odyssey. Pegasus Books. ISBN 978-1-639-36624-8.
- LoBrutto, Vincent (1999). Stanley Kubrick: A Biography. Da Capo Press. ISBN 978-0-306-80906-4.
- Poitier, Sidney (1980). This Life. New York: Knopf. ISBN 978-0-394-50549-7.
