= C.A.T. Squad =

1986 film directed by William Friedkin

- Genre: Action; Drama
- Written by: Gerald Petievich
- Directed by: William Friedkin
- Starring: Joseph Cortese; Jack Youngblood; Steve James
- Music by: Ennio Morricone
- Country of origin: United States
- Original language: English

Production
- Executive producer: William Friedkin
- Producers: Cynthia Chvatal; David Salven
- Production locations: Montréal; Mexicali, Baja California Norte, Mexico
- Cinematography: Robert D. Yeoman
- Editors: Bud S. Smith; M. Scott Smith
- Running time: 97 minutes
- Production company: NBC Productions

Original release
- Network: NBC
- Release: July 27, 1986

C.A.T. Squad (also titled Stalking Danger) is a 1986 television film starring Joseph Cortese, Jack Youngblood, Steve James, Bradley Whitford, and Barry Corbin. It is directed by William Friedkin and written by Gerald Petievich, who had collaborated on To Live and Die in L.A. the previous year. The original score was composed by Ennio Morricone.

The film follows the titular squad, an elite black ops unit, investigating a terrorist plot to sabotage a NATO defense project. It aired on NBC on July 27, 1986. It was followed by a sequel, C.A.T. Squad: Python Wolf, in 1988.

== Plot ==
After several scientists working on a NATO project are murdered, a special inter-governmental task force known as the Counter Assault Tactical (C.A.T.) Squad is assigned to protect the remaining scientists and neutralize the unknown threat.

The team is composed of leader Richard "Doc" Burkholder (Joseph Cortese), his second-in-command Bud Raines (Steve James), explosives expert John "Roadmaster" Sommers (Jack Youngblood), forensics expert Nikki Blake (Patricia Charbonneau), and new recruit Leon Trepper (Bradley Whitford), a young language expert.

When one of the scientists is killed by a rocket, the team is informed that a rocket launcher was stolen from a military base in Nuremberg, Germany. There they interrogate a soldier who admits he stole it for a supposed Nicaraguan freedom fighter, and provides the address of the man's girlfriend in Paris. An agent finds materials for counterfeiting passports along with the suspect's photo in the apartment but is attacked by the hitman while calling in the information to the C.A.T. Squad.

The squad find the remains of a burnt postcard and Blake uncovers a coded message in invisible ink. She deciphers the message as "Spivek", the head of the project and likely the next target. They place Spivek under protection. An unauthorized gas truck passes by the house where they are hiding Spivek so they search the house with a dog, who finds a gas leak. The team rushes the family outside to safety before the house explodes. For failing to report the gas truck, Trepper is demoted from house watchman to limo driver.

The hitman kills the policeman assigned as motorcycle escort for Spivek in order to take his identity. The hitman places a bomb on the car he is escorting. Trepper, driving the car, senses something is wrong and tells Roadmaster to get the passenger out. Roadmaster and their passenger escape but Trepper's door is stuck shut and he is trapped in the vehicle when it explodes. It is revealed that he was driving a decoy vehicle and Spivek is still alive in another car with Doc, Bud, and Nikki.

They piece together information pointing them to Sir Cyril Sharpe (Michael Sinelnikoff), curator of the British Museum of World Art, and attempt to identify the person he is meeting with in their photographs. Doc recognizes a scar on the hand of the other man and identifies him as Jorge Vialobos (Eddie Velez), also known as "Carlos", a terrorist-for-hire believed to be dead.

They know Jorge works with Dieter Porzig, a West German bush pilot in Angola who spends his time near the border in Mexico. They draw the hitman out of his hiding place in Mexico by sending a postcard in the same style as the burnt one they previously found, then allow him to notice the members of the C.A.T. Squad following him, causing him to gather the rest of his men together for an escape in a private plane. The C.A.T. Squad follows them and catches his men outside of the plane while Doc enters the plane and shoots Jorge in a final showdown.

At the end of the film Doc files a brief report to the Director, while "Carlos" is then shown stepping off of a bus in Mexico.

== Cast ==
- Joseph Cortese as Richard "Doc" Burkholder
- Jack Youngblood as John "Roadmaster" Sommers
- Steve James as Bud Raines
- Bradley Whitford as Leon Trepper
- Patricia Charbonneau as Nikki Blake
- Barry Corbin as The Director
- Eddie Velez as "Carlos"/Jorge Vialobos
- Frank Military as Willie Darby
- Anna Maria Horsford as Mrs. Raines
- Thomas Hauff as Nolan
- Vlasta Vrána as Colbert
- John Novak as Connery
- Anne Curry as Janet
- Sam Gray as Dr. Henry Spivek

== Production ==
Filming took place in Mexicali, Baja California and Montréal, Québec.

== Critical reception ==
Gannett News Service columnist Mike Hughes effusively praised the film's "crisp and intelligent" script. It was "superbly directed" with "carefully composed shots". Despite its lack of star actors, Hughes insisted that "the more you watch C.A.T. Squad, the more you admire it".
