= Jack Youngblood =

American football player (born 1950)

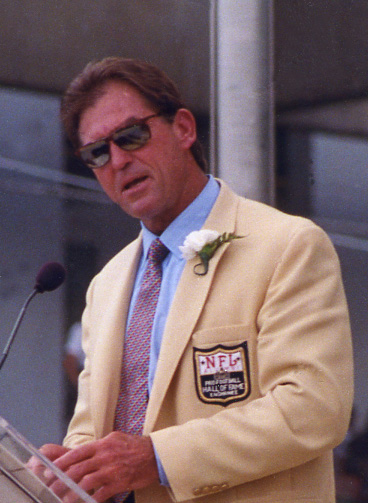
- Youngblood giving his Hall of Fame induction speech in 2001

No. 85
- Position: Defensive end

Personal information
- Born: January 26, 1950 (age 76); Jacksonville, Florida, U.S.
- Listed height: 6 ft 4 in (1.93 m)
- Listed weight: 247 lb (112 kg)

Career information
- High school: Jefferson County (Monticello, Florida)
- College: Florida (1967–1970)
- NFL draft: 1971: 1st round, 20th overall pick

Career history
- Los Angeles Rams (1971–1984)

Awards and highlights
- 5× First-team All-Pro (1974–1976, 1978, 1979); 3× Second-team All-Pro (1973, 1977, 1980); 7× Pro Bowl (1973–1979); 2× NFL sacks leader (1974, 1979); NFL 1970s All-Decade Team; St. Louis Football Ring of Fame; Los Angeles Rams No. 85 retired; First-team All-American (1970); First-team All-SEC (1970); Florida Football Ring of Honor (2006)

Career NFL statistics
- Games played: 202
- Games started: 187
- Sacks: 151.5
- Fumble recoveries: 10
- Safeties: 2
- Stats at Pro Football Reference
- Pro Football Hall of Fame
- College Football Hall of Fame

Herbert Jackson Youngblood III (born January 26, 1950) is an American former professional football player who was a defensive end for the Los Angeles Rams of the National Football League (NFL) for fourteen seasons during the 1970s and 1980s. He was a five-time consensus All-Pro and a seven-time Pro Bowl selection and was inducted to the Pro Football Hall of Fame. Before playing professionally, Youngblood played college football for the University of Florida, and was recognized as an All-American. He is considered among the best players Florida ever produced—a member of the College Football Hall of Fame and one of only six Florida Gators to be named to the Gator Football Ring of Honor.

After retiring as a player in 1985, Youngblood worked in the Rams' front office until 1991. He also worked in the front office of the Sacramento Surge of the World League (WLAF) from 1992 to 1993, and the Canadian Football League (CFL)'s Sacramento Gold Miners from 1993 to 1994. He was a vice-president, then president, of the Orlando Predators from 1995 until 1999. From 1999 through 2002, he served as the NFL's liaison for the Arena Football League (AFL).

Youngblood has made forays into broadcasting (both radio and television), acting, and business, and has written an autobiography. He was a popular spokesperson for various products, and he has been consistently involved in charity work, starting in college, continuing throughout his NFL career, and remaining so today. Currently, Youngblood serves on the NFLPA Mackey-White Traumatic Brain Injury Committee.

In 2014, Youngblood opened the Jack Youngblood Center for NeuroEnhancement in Orlando, Florida, which attempts to treat the symptoms of traumatic brain injury and offer care to patients in effort to restore normal brain function. Youngblood has stated, "The bonus with this therapy is that the time invested is minimal, while the results are extraordinary."

== Early life ==
Jack Youngblood was born in Jacksonville, Florida, the son of Herbert J. and Kay Youngblood. He has two sisters, Paula and Lynn. Youngblood attended Monticello-Jefferson County High School in Monticello, Florida, graduating in 1967. As an offensive lineman and linebacker, he was a starter on offense and defense and team captain of the state champion Tigers, earning All-State honors in 1966 after recording 70 tackles. He was also All-Big Bend, All-Conference and the Big Bend Linemen of the Year and the Outstanding Lineman for the Tigers that season while leading a defense that shutout seven opponents and allowed ten touchdowns in 12 games, including the state playoffs. He was a four-year letterman in football and also played basketball at M-JC High as well as participating in 4-H, Student Council, and Key Club International.

Youngblood was named to Florida's All-Time High school football team by Sports Illustrated in 1989. In November 2007, he was recognized as one of the state of Florida's thirty-three all-time greatest high school football players when he was voted to the Florida High School Athletic Association's All-Century High School football team.

== College career ==
At the University of Florida, Youngblood was a brother of the Alpha Tau Omega fraternity (Alpha Omega chapter), and was a three-year varsity letterman for coach Ray Graves and coach Doug Dickey's Florida Gators football teams from 1968 to 1970. Youngblood had entered school at 195 pounds and put on 10 pounds a year through weight-lifting, finishing around 245 pounds. Youngblood and his teammates were part of the testing for what became Gatorade, a beverage created by doctors Robert Cade and Dana Shires, designed to help Gator athletes who had to practice and play in Central Florida heat. Said Youngblood, "Dr. Cade began experimenting with Gatorade my freshman year. He tried to kill us all! That first stuff was lethal! It was thick, like syrup, and had an aftertaste. Then, it started to look like milk."

As a freshman, Youngblood played defensive end, wearing number 52, for the Gator freshman team. It was his first experience on the defensive line, after playing linebacker in high school. As a sophomore, Youngblood played defensive end and defensive tackle (recording 24 tackles and four sacks) while also handling the kicking chores for the Gators, kicking a career-long 42-yard field goal to provide the three-point winning margin in his first collegiate game which was against Air Force.

In 1969, Youngblood was part of a 9–1–1 Gators team that upset the Tennessee Volunteers in the Gator Bowl in coach Ray Graves's final game as coach at Florida. Youngblood played a key role in the Gator Bowl recording nine tackles and forcing a fumble. Youngblood first gained national attention after an October 4, 1969, five-sack performance 21–6 win versus instate rival Florida State University. He set a school record for sacks (14) in 1969 and led the teams' defensive linemen with 66 tackles.

In 1970, Youngblood was recognized as a first-team All-American, while recording 58 tackles and leading the team with 10 sacks to finish his Gator career with 29 quarterback sacks. Additionally, he was a finalist for the Outland Trophy following the 1970 season and was voted the 1970 SEC lineman of the year. Youngblood was also named to the SEC All-Conference team in 1970, which ended three winning seasons while at Florida. He was also the 1970 recipient of Florida's Fergie Ferguson Award, which goes to the senior who displays outstanding leadership, character, and courage. His performance in the Georgia-Florida rivalry earned him a spot in the Florida–Georgia Game Hall of Fame as well. In the 1970 edition of the game, Florida trailed Georgia by seven points and the Georgia offense had driven to Florida's one-yard line, Youngblood stopped a Georgia running back short of the goal line and forced him to fumble and then recovered the loose ball beginning a rally that gained a come-from-behind 24–17 victory.

Some regard Youngblood, who was considered to be an excellent pass rusher, as the best defensive lineman in Gators history as well as one of the top five players in the University of Florida's football program. When Time magazine chose him for their 1970 All-America Team, it said of Youngblood: "Deceptively fast for his size, he reads screens and swing passes so adroitly that he intimidates quarterbacks by his mere presence." His coach Doug Dickey told The Sporting News, "He is difficult to move when you run at him, has the speed and agility to pursue down the line of scrimmage, and the strength and quickness to rush the passer." In one of a series of articles written for The Gainesville Sun in 2006, Youngblood was ranked as the No. 5 all-time greatest player for the Florida Gators.

Youngblood graduated from the University of Florida with a bachelor's degree in finance in 1972.

== NFL career ==
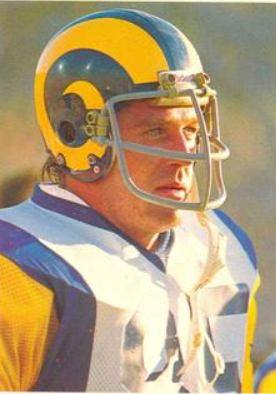
1980 card of Youngblood for Los Angeles Rams

Youngblood was selected by the Los Angeles Rams in the first round of the 1971 NFL draft. He was the 20th overall pick in that draft and signed a 3-year $105,000 contract including a $30,000 signing bonus. That season, he backed up Deacon Jones at left defensive end and started four games when Jones was sidelined with a severely sprained arch. He was named All-Rookie by Football Digest and after the season Jones was traded to the San Diego Chargers. In 1972, the left defensive end position was Youngblood's as he led the Rams defensive linemen in tackles with 70, and started 11 of the 14 games he played, recording six sacks.

In 1973, Youngblood was a Second-team All-pro selection and went to the first of his seven Pro Bowls and led the Rams with 16.5 sacks. The Ram defense led the NFL in fewest yards allowed and fewest rushing yards. He was voted the Rams defensive lineman of the year by the Rams Alumni Association. Beginning in the 1973 season, the Rams added the unrelated Jim Youngblood to its roster, so from that time on, both Youngbloods had the unique distinction of having their entire name on the back of their jerseys, the given name appearing above the family name. The following year, 1974, the Rams again led the NFL in rushing defense and Youngblood led the Rams with 15 sacks while being voted a consensus First-team All-Pro and being named to his second Pro Bowl. The Rams advanced to the NFC Championship game, losing 14–10 to the Minnesota Vikings.

Youngblood was honored as the NFC Defensive Player of the Year by United Press International in 1975 and Pro Football Weekly named Youngblood the NFL defensive lineman of the year. For the third consecutive season Youngblood led the Rams in sacks (15) and was named to the Pro Bowl and a consensus All-pro again, repeating his 1974 honors. In a December 1975, 35-23 playoff win over the St. Louis Cardinals, Youngblood pass-rushed Cardinals offensive lineman Dan Dierdorf, penetrated into the backfield, then tipped and intercepted a pass by Jim Hart, returning the interception 47 yards for a touchdown. Later in the game, Youngblood forced a fumble that was recovered by teammate Fred Dryer, blocked an extra point attempt, and sacked Hart to stop a Cardinals drive.

I'd love to watch Jack Youngblood play. His tan arms hanging out of his sleeveless jersey, he'd put those pipes on the ground, and even at 240 pounds, he would show great moves and natural strength for an undersized player. He was extremely quick, had underrated strength, and he got great leverage against the tackles.

— ESPN analyst Sean Salisbury

Youngblood repeated his NFC Defensive Player of the Year Award in 1976 while co-leading the Rams in sacks with 14.5, being named to his fourth consecutive Pro Bowl, and being a consensus first-team All-Pro for the third straight season. The following year, 1977, Youngblood was voted to his fifth consecutive Pro Bowl and a consensus All-NFC selection and second-team All-Pro while leading the Rams in sacks for the fifth straight season. In 1978, the Rams led the NFL in total defense and Youngblood was named to his sixth consecutive Pro Bowl and was a consensus first-team All-Pro for the fourth time in five years.

One of the athletic feats for which Youngblood is best known is that of playing in the 1979 playoffs, including Super Bowl XIV, with a fractured left fibula. He also played in the 1980 Pro Bowl with the injured leg, a week after the Super Bowl. In the playoffs, Youngblood sacked Dallas Cowboys quarterback Roger Staubach near the sideline in the waning moments of the divisional playoff game versus the Cowboys. Playing with the fractured leg was noted by Sports Illustrated in their Top 10 list of athletes playing in pain. For that and other achievements Jack was dubbed the "John Wayne of football" by Jim Hanifan, which was echoed by Hall of Fame coach John Madden. The NFL Network series NFL Top 10 selected Youngblood's performance in the 1979 playoffs as top on its list of the "Gutsiest Performances" of all time.

For the 1979 season, Youngblood had a career-high 18 sacks and was a consensus first-team All-Pro for the fifth time. He was voted to his seventh consecutive Pro Bowl. In 1980, he was second-team All-Pro and first-team All-NFC while leading the Rams with 11 1/2 sacks. In 1981, Youngblood led the Rams with 11 1/2 sacks and was the Rams outstanding defensive lineman. In the off-season, prior to the 1981 season, Jack had emergency surgery to remove a hot-dog sized blood clot from under his left arm. It was a result of repeated trauma to a nerve in his arm that blocked the flow of blood. Despite the broken leg and numerous other injuries, Youngblood played in 201 consecutive games, a Rams team record; and only missed one game in his 14-year NFL career. He played in seven straight Pro Bowls, five NFC Championships, and one Super Bowl. He was also the Rams' defensive captain from 1977 through 1984 and was voted the Dan Reeves award 3 times, which is awarded to the team's MVP. He had 151 1/2 career sacks and led the Rams in sacks nine times despite playing first in assistant Coach Ray Malavasi's stop-the-run-first defensive scheme and then in his final two seasons in Defensive Coordinator Fritz Shurmur's 3-4 two-gap scheme which limited some pass rush opportunities to make sure the opponent's running game was handled.

Youngblood faced a challenge in 1983 when the Rams adopted Shurmur's 3-4 defense. Critics thought Youngblood might be too small to play that position, yet he performed in it well (recording 10 1/2 sacks in 1983 and 9 1/2 sacks in 1984 while Rams were among the NFL's best defenses at stopping the run) despite being considered undersized. Among the standout games in Youngblood's final two seasons were the opening game of the 1983 season, against the New York Giants in which Youngblood recorded two sacks; and the 1983 season finale against the New Orleans Saints. In the Saints game Youngblood recorded 10 tackles, two sacks, recorded a safety and was named the NFL Defensive Player of the Year by Pro Football Weekly for the effort. In week 5 of 1984 against the New York Giants, Youngblood recorded two sacks, drew three holding calls and was named NFC Defensive Player of the Week by the NFL. Then, in week 10, against the St. Louis Cardinals, he dominated the game sacking Neil Lomax three times and drawing three holding calls, and blocking a potential game-tying field goal on the game's final play to preserve a 16-13 Rams win.

His streak of consecutive games played ended in week 15 of the 1984 season, when Youngblood had to sit out his first football game since being a collegiate player in 1970. He had suffered a ruptured disc in his lower back two weeks earlier. Despite the injury, he returned for the season finale against the 49ers and the playoffs. He attributed his ability to play to a series of back adjustments that allowed him more freedom of movement, even though team doctors told Youngblood he was out for the season and needed surgery. He was voted the Rams' recipient of the 1984 Ed Block Courage Award by "representing everything that is positive about professional football and serving as an inspiration in their locker rooms being a positive role model in his communities". Though the injury ended his streak, Youngblood still holds the record for most consecutive starts in the NFL by a strong-side defensive end with 184.

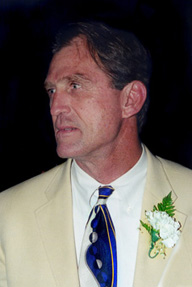
Youngblood at the Hall of Fame Gold Jacket Dinner, 2001

When Youngblood retired on August 27, 1985, he asked that his career be remembered for "dignity, integrity, respect and pride".

Season sack totals: 1971 (3), 1972 (6), 1973 (16 1/2), 1974 (15), 1975 (15), 1976 (14 1/2), 1977 (9 1/2), 1978 (7), 1979 (18), 1980 (11 1/2), 1981 (11 1/2), 1982 (4), 1983 (10 1/2), 1984 (9 1/2), Career total (151 1/2)

=== Los Angeles Rams records ===
- Most consecutive games played (201)
- Most career sacks in the playoffs (8 1/2)
- Most playoff starts (17)
- Most career safeties – tied (2)
- 2nd most career sacks (151 1/2)
- 2nd most career blocked kicks (8)

== Post-NFL career ==
=== Acting and broadcasting ===
Youngblood appeared in two television movies: C.A.T. Squad in 1986 and C.A.T. Squad: Python Wolf in 1988. In these TV movies, Youngblood played a Secret Service agent in the "Counter Assault Technical Squad" named John Sommers who was the "best weapons and munitions man in the business" and who was a fine secret service agent but hated big cities like Washington, D.C., and New York and was thus banished to Alaska. In the plotline of the movies "John Sommers" was a member of the Air Force Reserve who piloted an SR-71 spyplane. In these films, Youngblood starred along with Joe Cortese, Steve James, and Deborah Van Valkenburgh. He was nominated for an Emmy for Best Supporting Actor for his role in C.A.T. Squad: Python Wolf.

Both films were directed by William Friedkin who is most noted for directing The Exorcist, The French Connection, and The Boys in the Band.

Youngblood was a reporter and co-host for ESPN's NFL GameDay show in 1985 and 1986, alongside Chris Berman and was succeeded by co-host, Tom Jackson in 1987. In 1988, he auditioned for the NFL on CBS's NFL Today along with Dick Butkus, Lyle Alzado, and Gary Fencik, with Butkus being hired to fill the co-host slot. Youngblood was also a regular guest on ESPN programs Star-Shot (1988), Sportslook (1984, 1986, 1988) and Great Outdoors (1989) programs.

Youngblood was a radio analyst for the Los Angeles Rams from 1987 to 1991, the Sacramento Surge in 1992, and a television analyst for the Sacramento Gold Miners in 1993.

In 2000, Youngblood was hired as the co-host for Wal-Mart's Great Outdoors (with Bert Jones) and served in that capacity through 2003. The show was telecast 52 weeks a year and was a mainstay on ESPN's popular Saturday morning outdoors programming block, drawing impressive ratings throughout its 10-year history.

=== Autobiography ===
In 1988, Youngblood authored (with Joel Engel) his autobiography, Blood. The book outlined Youngblood's drive and passion for professional football and reviewed his career, his injuries, his successes, and his failures on the football field. The book recounts when, between the 1973 and 1974 seasons, Youngblood traveled to Logan, Utah, to help Rams teammates Merlin and Phil Olsen with their summer football camp. An altercation in the parking lot of a local pub resulted in Youngblood having a .44 pistol stuck in his eye and the trigger pulled. Fortunately the chamber was empty, although other chambers were not. A cut eyelid was the only injury he sustained. After initially pleading innocent, the assailant later pleaded guilty and received a one-year suspended sentence. The book was favorably reviewed by Publishers Weekly as "an unusual sports book."

=== Football administration ===
After his retirement, Youngblood worked in player relations and marketing for the Rams from 1985 to 1990 and served as the Rams' color analyst for the Rams Radio Network from 1986 to 1991. Youngblood moved to the World League of American Football as the Director of Marketing for the Sacramento Surge in 1991 (although he remained as Rams color announcer for the 1991 season), during which time the Surge won the 1992 World Bowl. He moved to the Sacramento Gold Miners of the Canadian Football League (CFL) in 1993. He also served as a color analyst for both the Surge and the Gold Miners radio networks and hosted a sports radio talk show at KHTK-AM 1140 in Sacramento, California, when that station became a sports format station in 1994.

In 1995, he returned to his native Florida as vice president and general manager, then later as president, of the Orlando Predators of the Arena Football League. One of his major projects with the Predators was taking the team a publicly traded company on the NASDAQ stock exchange. In 1998, Youngblood's final year with the team, the club won its first Arena League championship, defeating the favored Tampa Bay Storm. In 1999, he began to work for the AFL office as a liaison to the National Football League and served as a special consultant to the Arena Football League and arenafootball2.

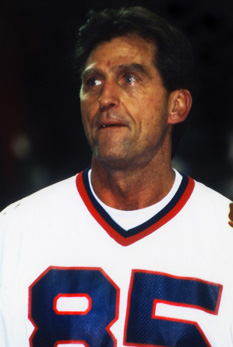
Youngblood at the Throwback Bowl, 1997

=== Business ===
Youngblood was a division president of Dave Liles Ethanol Fuels, which produces a fuel additive that purports to boost octane, clean fuel systems, and help the environment by reducing engine emissions and being completely biodegradable. He also owns and maintains a farm in his native North Florida, in which he currently raises pine trees and where he raised cattle until 2002.

During his NFL career, Youngblood partnered with Los Angeles Rams teammate Larry Brooks to open "The Wild Bunch" in 1980, a western clothing store that featured high-end western wear, including cowboy boots, cowboy hats, silver belt buckles, jeans, and other country apparel. Additionally, while still active with the Rams, Youngblood worked with BankAmericard, in a public relations capacity. He also owned and operated the South Coast Club in Huntington Beach, California, during his career.

Additionally, some of the sponsorships and advertising ventures Youngblood was involved with were a Miller Lite TV commercial in 1985 and Honda Power machines in 1985. He had print ads for Pro Tron Weights, regional ad, 1984, Dan Post Handcrafted Boots, national print-ad 1986, Cal-Gym, national print-ad, 1986, and was a national spokesman for Protatonin in 2001. In the mid-1980s he modeled Munsingwear briefs in a series of magazine and billboard ads. In the mid-1970s Jack did television commercials and print-ads for In-N-Out Burger, a California-based fast food chain.

=== Continuing popularity ===
During his career, Youngblood gained a loyal following which seems to continue through today. In July 2006, a game-used Jack Youngblood jersey sold for $6,565 in an online auction. Fox News' Mike Straka listed Youngblood as having one of the NFL's "great names".

In 2007, Sports Illustrated named Youngblood the greatest professional athlete to wear the uniform number 85. Youngblood was given the same honor in the 2004 book Right on the Numbers by Nino Frostino, and the Best Athletes by the Number blog. One of Youngblood's biggest fans, David G. Lewber, died on June 28, 2007. Mr. Lewber was buried in his autographed Jack Youngblood jersey a week later on July 3, 2007.

In October 2011, D.W. Cooper released Because It Was Sunday, a biography about Youngblood's playing career.

== Awards and honors ==
=== College ===
My sophomore year, we were in Tallahassee and I ran a reverse very early in the game, and I remember being nailed by Jack Youngblood. I remember watching the ball being given to me and thinking, when the ball was about halfway, that it was kind of race to see whether he was going to get to the ball first or me. He was foaming at the mouth. I still have nightmares from the hit he gave me.

— Barry Smith, Florida State University wide receiver

Youngblood was an All-American selection in 1970, as well as being the SEC Lineman of the Year, All-SEC, and a finalist for the Outland Trophy. After his college career, Youngblood played in the Senior Bowl and recorded four sacks. He was named the Outstanding Lineman of the Game and in 1989 he was voted into the Senior Bowl Hall of Fame. Additionally, he was voted a member of the 50th Anniversary Senior Bowl All-Time Team in 1999.

For his achievements he was selected to the All-Time SEC team in 1983. He was voted to the All-SEC Quarter-Century Team (1950–74) as well as being voted to the 25-year All-SEC teams which spanned from the 1961 through the 1985 seasons. He was voted best defensive end in SEC for the years 1960–85. Additionally, he was voted to the SEC All-Decade team for the 1970s. In 1995, Youngblood was voted one of the SEC Football Legends and was presented at the SEC championship game in Atlanta, Georgia.

Youngblood, who is regarded by some as the best defensive end in Gators history, was named to the All-time Florida Gators team in 1983, and in 1999 he was voted to the Florida Gator All-Century Team. In 2006, he was named to the 100-year Anniversary Gator Team. In 1975, Youngblood was voted to the Florida Sports Hall of Fame which features great athletes who played college or professional athletics and have a Florida connection. In 2001, he was elected to the University of Florida Athletic Hall of Fame. Five years later, in 2006, Youngblood was among the first four Gator legends to be inducted into the Florida Football Ring of Honor, alongside Steve Spurrier, Danny Wuerffel, and Emmitt Smith.

In 1992, Youngblood was elected to the College Football Hall of Fame. He was also selected to the FWAA 1969-1994 All-America Team with players like Lawrence Taylor, Jerry Rice, John Elway, Tony Dorsett, Ronnie Lott, and Jack Tatum. In 1999, he was named to the Sports Illustrated NCAA Football All-Century Team as one of only six defensive ends named to the squad.

He was named by one SEC publication as the Top All-Time SEC Defensive of All-Time. Youngblood was also named by the Birmingham News as one of the Top 10 defensive linemen in SEC history, ranking with SEC greats as Reggie White, Doug Atkins, and Bill Stanfill. In addition, he is one of the three the top defensive lineman in history of the SEC, making the 75th Anniversary All-SEC Team in 2007 as determined by votes of SEC fans.

=== National Football League ===
Youngblood was elected to NFL All-Pro teams five times (1974, 1975, 1976, 1978, 1979) during his 14 years with the Rams and was an All-NFC selection seven times (1974–80). In addition, Youngblood was a second-team All-Pro in 1973, 1977, and 1980 and was second-team All-NFC in 1973 and 1984. He was also named to seven Pro Bowls and was a first alternate to the game in 1984, his final season. Youngblood was on the 1984 All-Madden team and was chosen by John Madden as the player who most exemplified the All-Madden team.

Youngblood is a member of the Los Angeles Rams' 50th Anniversary Team (1985), and the Rams All-Century Team chosen after the 1999 season. In October 2001 he was honored in the St. Louis Rams Ring of Fame, along with Jackie Slater. Youngblood was voted the Rams' Outstanding Defensive Linemen by the Rams' Alumni nine times (1973, 1975–76, 1978–81, and 1983–84).

Youngblood, in 1987, was voted to the Orange County (California) Sports Hall of Fame along with Pat McCormick, Ann Meyers and Cap Sheue. Four years earlier Youngblood was recognized as the 1983 Orange County Sportsman of the Year by the Orange County Youth Sports Foundation. Other notable honorees have been Jim Nantz, Peter Ueberroth, John McKay, Bill Walsh, and Pete Carroll.

Youngblood played in 201 consecutive games, a Rams team record; he only missed one game in his 14-year NFL career. He was the Rams' defensive captain from 1977 through 1984 and was voted the recipient Dan Reeves award three times, which is awarded to the team's most valuable player. He had 151 1/2 career sacks and led the Rams in sacks nine times despite playing first in assistant coach Ray Malavasi's stop-the-run-first defensive scheme and then in his final two seasons in defensive coordinator Fritz Shurmer's 3-4 two-gap scheme which limited some pass rush opportunities to make sure the opponent's running game was handled. His highest single-season sack total was 18 in 1979.

He was elected to the Pro Football Hall of Fame in 2001 along with Ron Yary, Lynn Swann, Jackie Slater, Mike Munchak, Marv Levy, and Nick Buoniconti and inducted in August in Canton, Ohio. Youngblood echoed his post-retirement sentiments in his Hall of Fame acceptance speech by stating, "I didn't sack the quarterback every time I rushed the passer. I didn't make every tackle for a loss. I guess — no one could. But, it wasn't because I didn't have the passion to, the desire to. I hope that showed".

Jack Youngblood was a terror. He had a lot of heart; he played hard, he played tough, and he was as quick as a hiccup. He was on the small side but he had great pass rush moves, just a hellacious player.

— Hall of Fame tackle Art Shell

Youngblood's style of play and perceived ability to play hurt brought many notations in NFL lore. In 1996 NFL Films named him to their list of the 100 Toughest Players of All-Time and in 2006 NFL writer Neil Reynolds featured Youngblood in his 2006 book "Pain Gang", in which Reynolds names Youngblood as one of the 50 Toughest players of All-Time. In addition, Blitz magazine, The Sporting News, Football Digest, and Sport magazine have singled Youngblood out as one of the toughest and one of the hardest hitting players of all time. He was named by Yahoo! writer Charles Robinson as the best-ever player taken in the 20th slot of the 1st round of the NFL draft calling Youngblood "the essence of today's defensive end—a mixture of strength, toughness and speed that few ends boasted in the 1970s." In 2000, Sports Illustrated ranked Youngblood as No. 4 in its list of the greatest pass rushers of all time, behind only Deacon Jones, Reggie White and Lawrence Taylor.

During his career, Jack won the respect of both teammates and opponents. Dan Dierdorf, a Hall of Fame tackle, said that Youngblood was "by far the toughest opponent I faced in my career", a thought echoed by Viking Hall of Fame tackle Ron Yary who said, "There wasn't anybody who was tougher to block than Jack". Other NFL greats such as Hall of Fame tackles Bob Brown and Rayfield Wright, rank Jack among the top players they faced. Opposing quarterbacks ranked Youngblood highly, with two of them, Fran Tarkenton and Roger Staubach, stating that Jack was the top defensive lineman they faced in their careers. Hall of Fame defensive tackle Merlin Olsen paid Youngblood the highest compliment by stating that Jack was the "perfect defensive end". Running backs also entered the chorus, "I remember bouncing off Jack Youngblood and it was just like a pillar of strength over there on the defense," Rocky Bleier recalled. "Jack played hurt, he played tough, and he was a great opponent."

To all the praise, Youngblood responded, "I don't consider myself tough, I consider myself a nut for some of the things I did". Youngblood concluded, "I wasn't the biggest guy, I certainly wasn't the strongest and I wasn't the fastest either. But I think one of my biggest assets was that I had an undeniable determination to be the best that has ever put his hand on the ground, I had a genuine desire to be great."

== Charitable activities ==
While at the University of Florida, Youngblood was involved in the Fellowship of Christian Athletes while also speaking to youth groups and raising funds for needy children. One such event was a 57-mile bicycle ride he organized which intended to send disadvantaged youth to a summer camp. Youngblood was involved in the 1974 NFL-USO tour to Vietnam and Southeast Asia. In 1977, Youngblood was the chairman of the Los Angeles-area "Right to Read" program and active in the Muscular Dystrophy Foundation. The same year, he was the United Way spokesman for the Rams and was the club's Man of the Year nominee in 1975 and 1983. In 1986 he participated in Hands Across America, an event to end hunger in the United States. Other NFL stars including Walter Payton and Tony Dorsett were also in the nationwide hand-holding line. In his final 13 years (1979–1991) in Los Angeles, Youngblood sponsored a celebrity golf tournament for the John Tracy Clinic for Deaf Children, and was active with programs at the Children's Hospital for Orange County. He was named the Orange County "Sportsman of the Year" by the hospital in 1987.

Since 2001, Youngblood has been the St. Louis Rams' host for the Taste of the NFL charity event, a dinner held annually at the Super Bowl to raise funds for Feeding America-The Nation's Foodbank Network. In April 2007, Youngblood was inducted into the National Football League Alumni Association's prestigious Order of the Leather Helmet, which is the highest award for the NFL Alumni given to those "who make a lasting impression on the game".

Throughout his NFL career and after Youngblood has been a skilled public speaker, sought after by corporate, athletic, and Christian groups due to his activity and success in those arenas. He attends hunting, fishing and golf outings when associated with a good cause. He is active in the Orlando chapter of Young Life, a nationwide organization whose goals include attempting to mentor young men and women in the Christian faith. Jack's wife, Barbara Youngblood, serves on the executive committee for Young Life for the Orlando Chapter.

Youngblood served on the Honorary Advisory Board of the former St. Louis Rams notables like Bill Cosby, August A. Busch III, Jonathan Winters, Dick Gephardt, Jackie Joyner-Kersee, and Stan Musial, Maxine Waters, Dr. Toby Freedman, et al. Former members of the Rams Advisory Board, created in 1981, include Lord David Westbury, former Ram and Evangelist Rosey Grier, Maureen Reagan, Henry Mancini, Bob Hope, Danny Thomas, Jane Upton Bell, and former President Gerald Ford among others.

Youngblood is involved in helping former NFL players in need by supporting the Gridiron Greats Assistance Fund (GGAF). The Gridiron Greats sponsors golf tournaments, autograph signings, memorabilia auctions, clay pigeon shoots and dinners to raise funds for retired players.

== See also ==
- 1970 College Football All-America Team
- List of Alpha Tau Omega brothers
- List of College Football Hall of Fame inductees (players)
- List of Florida Gators football All-Americans
- List of Florida Gators in the NFL draft
- List of Los Angeles Rams awards
- List of Los Angeles Rams first-round draft picks
- Los Angeles Rams all-time roster
- List of Pro Football Hall of Fame inductees
- List of University of Florida alumni
- University of Florida Athletic Hall of Fame
