= C.A.T. Squad: Python Wolf =

- Genre: Action; Drama
- Written by: Robert Ward; Gerald Petievich; William Friedkin
- Directed by: William Friedkin
- Starring: Joseph Cortese; Jack Youngblood; Steve James
- Music by: Ennio Morricone
- Country of origin: United States
- Original language: English

Production
- Executive producer: William Friedkin
- Producer: David Salven
- Production location: Montréal
- Cinematography: Guy Dufaux
- Editor: Jere Huggins
- Running time: 93 minutes
- Production company: NBC Productions

Original release
- Network: NBC
- Release: May 23, 1988

C.A.T. Squad: Python Wolf is a 1988 television film directed by William Friedkin and starring Joseph Cortese, Jack Youngblood, Steve James, and Deborah Van Valkenburgh. It is the sequel to C.A.T. Squad (1986) and aired May 23, 1988.

== Plot ==
Bud Raines organizes the purchase of plutonium from a pair of smugglers. The C.A.T. Squad traces the smuggling to South African extremists. Special Agent Nikki Pappas is sent to contact Paul Kiley, one of the key people involved in the smuggling. She gains his trust and becomes his lover over a period of weeks. Her fiancé John Sommers is called in for Air Force Reserve duty. After taking aerial photographs they are targeted by a fighter plane that causes them to crash in the mountains of South Africa. The crew members parachute to safety but the radio operator is shot in the woods by extremists and the rest are imprisoned in a labor camp by Georg Bekker, the man seeking to obtain the plutonium.

Bud, Nikki, and Richard are told that the information about John's disappearance in South Africa cannot be disclosed because it is part of a secret program known as Python Wolf. Richard breaks into the office of Highsmith, the head of the program, and collects recently shredded documents, which Nikki scans into a computer and reassembles. They show that Lt. Colonel Vincent Trask is calling the shots. Trask insists that there were no survivors of the crash.

Mr. Curtin informs Paul that Nikki is an agent and Paul stabs her to death. Richard and Bud follow Paul to a subway train where he is murdered by one of Mr. Curtin's men. They pursue the killer and Richard is shot shortly before Bud captures the killer. Bud beats the killer into confessing that he was hired by Curtin, then he tapes Trask proposing destroying the labor camp to cover up the failed mission.

Richard is released from the hospital and confronts Jim about Trask's plan, tricking him into saying that Trask is leaving that night. Bud and Richard take Trask's plane and fly to the camp, where they find most of the prisoners already killed. Bud finds John upstairs in a barn beaten but alive.

Bekker attempts to steal plutonium from a nearby reactor in South Africa but Richard, acting as a worker named Mr. Kurtz, activates a meltdown alarm. Becker is unconvinced that there is actually a meltdown and shoots at Richard, who releases hot steam from a pipe into Becker's face, causing him to fall into a giant transformer connection and die of electrocution.

== Cast ==
- Joseph Cortese as Richard "Doc" Burkholder
- Jack Youngblood as John Sommers
- Steve James as Bud Raines
- Deborah Van Valkenburgh as Nikki Pappas
- Miguel Ferrer as Paul Kiley
- Alan Scarfe as Georg Bekker
- Brian Delate as Vincent Trask
- Vlasta Vrána as Colbert

== Production ==
Filming took place in Montréal, Québec.
