= Killer on the Road =

1986 novel by James Ellroy

Silent Terror / Killer on the Road
- First edition cover
- Author: James Ellroy
- Language: English
- Genre: Crime novel
- Publisher: Avon
- Publication date: October 1986
- Publication place: United States
- Media type: Print (Paperback)
- Pages: 280 pp (first edition, paperback)
- ISBN: 0-380-89934-5 (first edition, paperback)
- OCLC: 20939952
- Preceded by: Suicide Hill (1985)
- Followed by: The Black Dahlia (1987)

Killer on the Road is a crime novel by American author James Ellroy. First published in 1986, it is a non-series book between the Lloyd Hopkins Trilogy and the L.A. Quartet. It was first released by Avon as a mass-market paperback original under the title Silent Terror, and has since been republished in the U.S. under Ellroy's original title Killer on the Road, first as a mass-market paperback in 1990 and later as a trade paperback in 1999.

Killer on the Road returns to the first-person narrative style of Ellroy's first two novels. For the first time in Ellroy's career, however, the story is written from a criminal's point of view. The basic premise—a serial killer who uses a large van as a mobile killing room in which he murders hitchhikers—was apparently inspired by the case of Lawrence Bittaker and Roy Norris. As revealed in Ellroy's autobiography My Dark Places, several elements of the main character's young adult life (such as being a peeping tom and breaking into women's homes to steal undergarments) were lifted directly from Ellroy's own crimes as a juvenile.

== Plot summary ==
Martin Plunkett is a child genius who comes from a broken home: His father is a hustler, and his mother is a promiscuous substance abuser. After his parents divorce, Martin takes solace in a series of disturbing fantasies in which he re-assembles his classmates' body parts. These lead Martin to becoming a peeping tom; between the ages of 7 and 11, he spends his free time spying on his neighbors and observing sexual encounters. Martin's teachers, having noticed his withdrawn nature in class, send him to the school psychologist, who identifies Martin as disturbed but nonetheless passes him to high school after Martin emotionally manipulates him into a fit of rage.

In high school, Martin becomes obsessed with a series of comic books and fixates on the main villain, "Shroud Shifter", a jewel thief obsessed with becoming invisible. He comes to the conclusion that his own goal should become "invisibility" in the sense that he can move through life as nondescript as possible. He steals from his mother to finance a series of wardrobes which will allow him to blend in with as diverse a number of people as possible; when she punishes him, he switches her muscle relaxers with massive quantities of amphetamines, causing her to suffer a psychotic break and slit her wrists; Martin drinks her blood before reporting the suicide.

Martin is placed in the foster care of an LAPD officer, whom he sets about manipulating in order to gain knowledge of how to become a good criminal. He begins committing a series of fetishistic burglaries in which he breaks into women's homes, kills their pets, and steals from them after watching them engage in intercourse. Following the Tate-LaBianca murders, Martin breaks into a female prostitute's apartment and attempts to watch her and a man he incorrectly identifies as Charles Manson have sex. Both of them apprehend Martin, and he is sentenced to a year in prison.

In custody, Martin works to perfect his body while studying under other criminals and learning their techniques. Doing janitorial work as a trusty, he encounters the recently incarcerated Manson; furious that the rambling, barely coherent Manson is being held up as a paragon of evil, Martin resolves to become the kind of killer truly worthy of that distinction. Upon his release, Martin delves further into his fantasy life, with Shroud Shifter urging him to commit more violent crimes in a series of schizophrenic visions.

Finally, one night, Martin abruptly lashes out and kills a couple who had invited him to their apartment to smoke marijuana. He successfully covers up his crime by making the murder appear to be the work of drug dealers; now fully entrenched in a version of his fantasy life that overlaps with reality, Martin embarks on a road trip across the United States, picking up hitchhikers, brutally murdering them, then selling their belongings to fences to finance his lifestyle. As time progresses and his body count rises, Martin perfects his techniques, outfitting a Dodge van with a series of hidden compartments and living amenities so that it can act as both his mobile home and murder factory.

In Wisconsin, Martin is apprehended by police sergeant Ross Anderson, who reveals himself to also be a serial killer, targeting students. The two men become romantically involved, and Anderson uses his influence to protect Martin. As the murders increase in frequency and brutality, FBI Agent Thomas Dusenberry is tasked with apprehending the killers. He eventually captures Anderson, who gives up Martin in exchange for immunity from the death penalty. After he sees his own photo on wanted posters, Martin reasons—using a chain of paranoid logic—that Anderson's family identified him. He goes to Anderson's house and violently murders his entire family. Afterwards he experiences a moment of lucidity during which he realizes that they had no role in his being identified. Martin goes to a motel where he identifies himself to the manager and ultimately surrenders to Dusenberry.

Martin only confesses to crimes in non-death-penalty states, assuring via an immunity deal that he will never be executed. He is sentenced to four consecutive life sentences without the possibility of parole and placed into solitary confinement at Sing Sing. Remaining in a catatonic state for an extended period of time, he finally breaks his silence by contacting a publisher and asking for assistance writing his memoirs (which make up the bulk of the novel). Dusenberry, troubled by Martin's motiveless murders, seeks solace in his family, only to discover that his wife has been having an affair. When he confronts her, she attempts to rationalize it before begging for forgiveness, all the while attempting to deflect blame. Dusenberry sells his diary to Martin's agent for use in Plunkett's book before committing suicide, leaving his entire estate to his children.

In Sing Sing, Martin finishes his memoirs. Believing that he has reached the pinnacle of human existence, and robbed of further murder opportunities, he announces his intention to kill himself by willing himself into a state of brain death.
