= Cop (film) =

1988 film by James B. Harris

- Theatrical release poster
- Directed by: James B. Harris
- Written by: James B. Harris
- Based on: Blood on the Moon by James Ellroy
- Produced by: James B. Harris; James Woods
- Starring: James Woods; Lesley Ann Warren; Charles Durning; Charles Haid; Raymond J. Barry
- Cinematography: Steve Dubin
- Edited by: Anthony Spano
- Music by: Michel Colombier
- Distributed by: Atlantic Releasing Corporation
- Release date: March 11, 1988
- Running time: 110 minutes
- Country: United States
- Language: English
- Budget: $5–7 million
- Box office: $1.9 million

Cop is a 1988 American neo-noir crime suspense film written and directed by James B. Harris, starring James Woods, Lesley Ann Warren and Charles Durning. It is based on the 1984 book Blood on the Moon, by James Ellroy. Harris and Woods co-produced the film, a first for their careers.

== Plot ==
LAPD detective Sgt. Lloyd Hopkins is a troubled cop, with a high arrest record but a notoriety for refusing to follow procedure. After taking a tip from a man reporting a murder, he visits the given address and discovers a woman's mutilated and bloodied body, proceeding to collect evidence on his own without informing his superiors. Afterwards, he returns home and argues with his wife, who is concerned about the influence he is having on his 8 year old daughter. He calls on his partner Dutch Peltz to engage in a stakeout, which culminates in Hopkins shooting and killing the suspect. Hopkins then proceeds to flirt with the suspect's date, and asks Dutch to stay at the scene and take care of the situation while he drives the woman home.

Hopkins tracks down Joanie Pratt, an unsuccessful actress turned drug dealer and escort, through classified ads discovered at the victim's apartment, and meets her at a cafe for information. Back at the station, Hopkins finds a poem that was sent to the victim and written in blood, whose content leads Hopkins to suspect that the murderer has killed before. When he returns home, he finds a farewell note from his wife, who has left with their daughter. Pratt phones Hopkins, and he goes over to her place to have sex, unaware that someone is watching them.

After sorting through a trove of cold case murder files, Hopkins summons Deputy Sheriff Delbert "Whitey" Haines to a diner and brusquely interrogates him about two suicides that took place on the same date a year apart on his beat. Afterwards, Hopkins breaks into Haines's apartment and discovers a wiretap that has captured evidence of Haines dealing drugs. While searching for leads, Hopkins visits a feminist bookstore run by Kathleen McCarthy, who agrees to accompany him to a party at Dutch's house. During the evening, which culminates in a lengthy discussion at McCarthy's house, she discloses a high school incident in which a group of boys, hostile to her feminist poetry club, sexually assaulted her. She reveals to Hopkins that an anonymous suitor has been sending her flowers and a poem every year. Hopkins discovers a picture of Whitey with a male prostitute nicknamed "Birdman" in her old yearbook, whose name is mentioned in the surveillance tapes made at Whitey's apartment.

When Birdman turns up dead in a motel room, Hopkins finds a message written in blood at the scene, which turns out to be the motto of the high school McCarthy attended. Hopkins returns to Whitey's apartment and surprises him as he comes home, carrying Birdman's police file. Whitey claims Birdman is his snitch, but Hopkins reveals his knowledge of Whitey's involvement with drugs and male prostitution by way of Birdman. An irate Hopkins threatens Whitey and coerces him into confessing to raping McCarthy during their high school years. Whitey feigns having to use the bathroom, only to go to retrieve a shotgun; Hopkins is ready for him, however, and kills him. Afterwards, Hopkins learns via a message on his home phone that he has been suspended and is under investigation by Internal Affairs.

Pratt calls Hopkins again, desiring another hookup, but when he arrives at her apartment, he discovers she has been murdered and her body propped up in the kitchen, where they had previously had sex. At the police station, Hopkins and Dutch persuade McCarthy to examine the yearbook in order to cross-reference suspects, but they are interrupted by their police captain, who reminds Hopkins of his suspension and orders him to leave. When Hopkins returns to the interrogation room, he sees that McCarthy has left and run to a phone booth across the street. She calls Bobby Franco, another member of her high school poetry club, to warn him that Hopkins might harass him, but Hopkins shows up at the phone booth and causes Franco to reveal that he is not only the person who has been sending McCarthy flowers and poems, but also the killer. Franco demands that Hopkins meet him at the high school to settle the score.

At the high school, Franco lures Hopkins into the gym, and a shootout occurs. Eventually, Hopkins overpowers and disarms Franco, who surrenders. Franco taunts Hopkins, reasoning that as Hopkins is a cop, he is obligated to arrest him. Hopkins responds, "Well, there's some good news, and there's some bad news. The good news is, you're right; I'm a cop, and I gotta take you in." as Franco smirks, thinking he'd get arrested. However, Hopkins says, "The bad news is, I've been suspended, and I don't give a fuck.", as Franco goes from smug to alarmed as he is shot and killed in cold blood offscreen, and Hopkins cocks his shotgun before the screen cuts to black.

== Cast ==
- James Woods as Sergeant Lloyd Hopkins
- Lesley Ann Warren as Kathleen McCarthy
- Charles Durning as Detective Arthur "Dutch" Peltz
- Charles Haid as Delbert "Whitey" Haines
- Raymond J. Barry as Captain Fred Gaffney
- Randi Brooks as Joanie Pratt
- Steven Lambert as Bobby Franco
- Christopher Wynne as Jack Gibbs
- Jan McGill as Jen Hopkins
- Vicki Wauchope as Penny Hopkins
- Melinda Lynch as Sarah Smith
- John Petievich as Deputy
- Dennis Stewart as Lawrence "Birdman" Henderson
- Annie McEnroe as Amy Cranfield

== Production ==
Filming began on March 9, 1987 in Los Angeles under the working title Blood on the Moon.

== Critical reception ==
On Rotten Tomatoes the film has an approval rating of 84% based on 19 reviews.

Linda Rasmussen of AllMovie gave the film three out of five stars and described the film as a "grim, brutally violent, darkly humorous modern-day film noir," whilst noting the film's "violent and exciting conclusion". Rasmussen also noted "Cop is completely absorbing because of Woods' chillingly effective performance. Few actors can make an amoral, clever, sardonic, and vicious character as appealing as Woods. As Hopkins, Woods combines complex contradictions with ease, showing the various sides of his character's personality. Cop, while singularly unpleasant is always insightful and fascinating."

Roger Ebert gave the film three out of four stars, writing "Anyone without a history of watching James Woods in the movies might easily misread Cop. They might think this is simply a violent, sick, contrived exploitation picture, and that would certainly be an accurate description of its surfaces. But Woods operates in this movie almost as if he were writing his own footnotes. He uses his personality, his voice and his quirky sense of humor to undermine the material and comment on it, until Cop becomes an essay on this whole genre of movie. And then, with the movie's startling last shot, Woods slams shut the book. It's as if Woods and Harris watched a Dirty Harry movie one night and decided to see what would happen if Harry were really dirty."

Jay Boyar of the Orlando Sentinel gave the film three out of five stars, under the conclusive headline "Cop is Dirty Harry with a human touch."

Author James Ellroy was not a fan of the adaptation of his novel, placing it in the "Films to Flee" part of his website.

Janet Maslin, writing for The New York Times, did not care for the movie, giving an overall mixed review, noting that "the plot leaves a lot to be desired, especially since it devotes no more than 30 seconds' thought to the killer's motive or his history," and that aspects were not believable, including some of the police work, all the scenes of Woods with his family, and those of Charles Durning professing feminist views. She felt the directing was "workmanlike and somewhat flat." She did praise Lesley Ann Warren for being "charming in an idiotic role," and James Woods for being "far and away the best thing" in the movie.

Rob Salem for the Toronto Star reviewed the film upon its release, stating "The best thing that can be said of Cop is that it reunites three veteran screen cops - Woods, Charles Durning and Charles Haid, who previously served together (under happier circumstances) in The Choirboys over a decade ago. Of course, the performances aren't the problem here. No one could make sense of the movie's confused message - if in fact there is a message here to make sense of."

The Atlanta Journal-Constitution gave a favorable review and described the film as a "crackling good mystery-thriller, powered by the live-wire presence of James Woods in the title role." Los Angeles Times gave the film a favorable review too and stated "Cop represents a career-high for James B. Harris, best known as Stanley Kubrick's early producer, who's directed infrequently but always provocatively over the years - if not always with success. Contributing to "Cop's" crisp, understated style is a standout supporting cast headed by Charles Durning, Michel Colombier's ominous, plaintive score and Gene Rudolf's carefully detailed realistic production design. "Cop" stirs up such a strong visceral appeal one can only hope that audiences will think about it after the lights go up."

USA Today gave the film a mixed review and stated "Despite lapses into predictability, Cop boasts brisk pacing and intriguing performances by Woods - is he getting more handsome? - and Lesley Ann Warren, who deserves better than the bizarro she plays here." Newsday also gave the film a favorable review.

The film was broadcast on February 10, 1989, on American TV and The Madison Courier gave the film a two out of four star rating in their film listings. The film was also broadcast on February 21, 1992, on American TV and the Ludington Daily News gave the film a two out of four-star rating in their listings.
