= Fast-Walking =

1982 film by James B. Harris

- Movie Poster
- Directed by: James B. Harris
- Written by: James B. Harris
- Based on: The Rap by Ernest Brawley
- Produced by: James B. Harris
- Starring: James Woods; Tim McIntire; Kay Lenz; Robert Hooks; M. Emmet Walsh
- Cinematography: King Baggot
- Edited by: Douglas Stewart
- Music by: Lalo Schifrin
- Production company: Lorimar Productions
- Distributed by: Pickman Film Corporation
- Release date: October 8, 1982 (New York City)
- Running time: 115 minutes
- Country: United States
- Language: English
- Budget: $4 million

Fast-Walking is a 1982 American prison drama film directed, produced, and written by James B. Harris, based on Ernest Brawley's 1974 novel The Rap. The film stars James Woods, Tim McIntire, Kay Lenz, Robert Hooks, and M. Emmet Walsh.

== Plot ==
Frank Miniver, aka Fast-Walking, is a corrupt but lovable Oregon state prison guard. Not the most obliging or honest of public servants, he smokes and peddles marijuana and complements his meager salary by running prostitutes for Mexican laborers out of his cousin Evie's convenience store.

At work, he is in close contact with his other cousin, Wasco, who is incarcerated. Wasco is involved in vice operations both inside and outside of the prison. He peddles women, narcotics, and is looking to get into fraudulent banking operations. He bullies a competitor called Bullet into turning over his in-prison operations to Wasco.

An accomplice to Wasco on the outside is an attractive young woman called Moke. She carries on his bidding, which means even seducing Fast-Walking with sex.

A black political prisoner named Galliot soon arrives at the prison, and Wasco plots to have him killed in the racially tense environment. Fast-Walking arranges to have Galliot sprung from prison. Galliot offers him $50,000 and a secret key hidden in his belt buckle that is to a safe-deposit box.

Wasco eventually learns about Fast-Walking and Moke having an intense sexual relationship and becomes jealous. So, he launches a scheme to have Moke kill Galliot, which she does with a high-powered rifle as he nearly gets away dressed as a prison guard. But Fast-Walking soon teaches him that what goes around, comes around.

== Cast ==
- James Woods as Frank "Fast-Walking" Miniver
- Tim McIntire as Wasco, Frank's Cousin
- Kay Lenz as Moke, Wasco's Girlfriend
- Robert Hooks as William Galliot
- Charles Weldon as Officer Jackson
- M. Emmet Walsh as Sergeant Sanger
- Susan Tyrrell as Evie, Wasco's Sister & Frank's Cousin
- John Friedrich as "Squeeze"
- Lance LeGault as Lieutenant Barnes
- Timothy Carey as "Bullet"
- Deborah White as Elaine Schector
- Sandy Ward as The Warden
- Sydney Lassick as Ted
- Helen Page Camp as Ted's Wife
- K Callan as Motel Manager

== Notes ==
- Both Tim McIntire and M. Emmett Walsh had appeared in the 1980 prison drama Brubaker with Robert Redford.
- A prisoner is heard yelling at wake-up, "When Do We Eat?" These are the same lines spoken sarcastically at the beginning of Shawshank Redemption by a new inmate just before Byron Hadley guts him with a billy club.

== Production ==
The idea of the film came from producer and director James B. Harris, who read a book called "The Rap" by Ernest Brawley. Harris wrote the screenplay shortly after reading the book. In June 1980, Lorimar Productions sold the rights to the film, & preparation's began. The location crew chose the vacant old Montana State Prison building in Deer Lodge, Montana.

In the coming days, officials begin screening extras. The arts foundation began restoring the prison building for the restoration project. However, due to heavy rains & volcanic ash fallout from the eruption of Mount St. Helens on May 18, work was delayed.

James Woods had signed on to play the prison guard, Frank Miniver, nicknamed Fast-Walking, & was "ecstatic" after learning the movie would be filmed in Montana.

On a budget of $4 million, principal photography began on July 7, 1980, at the prison. Some filming was done in and around the town of Deer Lodge for several weeks. The crew then traveled to the Bus Depot in Butte, Montana, to film several scenes for 2 days. Filming was then completed in August.

== Release ==
Fast-Walking was theatrically released in New York City, New York, on October 8, 1982, by the Pickman Film Corporation. It was released on VHS and DVD in the United States by Warner Home Video.

== Reception ==
The film received mostly negative reviews. In The New York Times, Vincent Canby wrote: "Fast-Walking is a prison melodrama of such consistent, proud witlessness that it deserves mention though not attendance...Nothing works."

== See also ==
- Brubaker (1980)
- Shawshank Redemption (1994)
