= Because the Night (novel) =

1986 novel by James Ellroy

- Author: James Ellroy
- Language: English
- Series: Lloyd Hopkins Trilogy
- Genre: Novel, crime fiction
- Publisher: The Mysterious Press
- Publication date: October 1986
- Publication place: United States
- Media type: Print (hardback & paperback), audio cassette and audio CD
- Pages: 280 pp (first edition, hardcover)
- ISBN: 978-0-89296-071-2 (first edition, hardcover)
- OCLC: 11696202
- Dewey Decimal: 813/.54 20
- LC Class: PS3555.L6274 B4 1984
- Preceded by: Blood on the Moon (1984)
- Followed by: Suicide Hill (1985)

Because the Night is a crime fiction novel written by James Ellroy.

Released in 1984, it is the second installment of a trilogy that is either titled "Lloyd Hopkins Trilogy" after its main character, or "L.A Noir", after the hardcover omnibus that was released in 1998 containing all three books in the trilogy. Like Blood on the Moon (first book) and Suicide Hill (third and final book), it follows Lloyd Hopkins an LAPD robbery-homicide detective in the 1980s.

== Plot summary ==
Because the Night features Hopkins investigating a triple murder at a liquor store. Nothing was stolen, leading Hopkins to suspect that the crime was a thrill killing. His investigation crosses paths with psychiatrist John Havilland, who uses drugs and professional expertise to manipulate a small group of followers into crime and debauchery.
