= Boiling Point (1993 film) =

1993 American film by James B. Harris

- Theatrical release poster
- Directed by: James B. Harris
- Screenplay by: James B. Harris
- Based on: Money Men by Gerald Petievich
- Produced by: Leonardo De La Fuente; Marc Frydman
- Starring: Wesley Snipes; Dennis Hopper; Lolita Davidovich; Viggo Mortensen; Dan Hedaya
- Cinematography: King Baggot
- Edited by: Jerry Brady
- Music by: John D'Andrea; Buddy Feyne; Cory Lerios
- Production companies: Le Studio Canal+ Hexagon Films
- Distributed by: Warner Bros.
- Release date: April 16, 1993
- Running time: 92 minutes
- Country: United States
- Language: English
- Budget: $10 million
- Box office: $10 million (US)

Boiling Point is a 1993 American action thriller film written and directed by James B. Harris and starring Wesley Snipes. The film co-stars Dennis Hopper, Lolita Davidovich, and Viggo Mortensen. It is based on the 1982 novel Money Men by former U.S. Secret Service agent Gerald Petievich.

The film was released in the United States on April 16, 1993. It was Harris' last film.

== Plot ==
The film opens in Los Angeles with Treasury Agent Jimmy Mercer and his partner Brady doing some undercover work, when Mercer's fellow agent is shot and killed by a new man, Ronnie, whom criminal Rudolph "Red" Diamond pulled out of jail. Now on a snap of anger and thoughts of revenge, Mercer wants to find the killer and take him down before he gets transferred to Newark, New Jersey. Although a cop and close colleague claims over dinner that Mercer must do it "by the book", Mercer replies with, "When I'm done with this motherfucker, I'm gonna put him in a box..... by the book."

A background theme is the closing of a big band dance emporium called the Palace. Lonely, Red takes hooker Vikki there for dancing. Vikki is also involved romantically with Mercer, who is estranged from his ex-wife.

Red continues to try to build a relationship with his old girlfriend, waitress Mona. Typically, he has manipulated and betrayed her in the past.

Red is under increasing pressure to repay mob debts to boss Tony Dio. He manipulates Ronnie into a crime spree culminating in the murder of the boss and ransacking his apartment. He tells Ronnie to meet him at the palace at 9 PM to split up the money. He asks Mona to meet him there as well. Mercer is building his case against Red and arrives at the murder scene seconds too late. Red is soon arrested and a net is laid for Ronnie at the club.

At the club Red again manipulates Ronnie in an attempt to escape, yelling gun as he ducks. Ronnie is shot and killed by Mercer in the exchange, but not before Ronnie manages to seriously wound Brady. In the chaos, Red almost manages to escape but he is blocked by cops stationed outside the club. As Red is taken away in the police car, Mona arrives and sees him pass by in the car.

The epilogue reveals that Jimmy and Vikki moved together to Newark, while Red was sentenced to life without parole for his crimes.

== Cast ==
- Wesley Snipes as US Treasury Agent Jimmy Mercer
- Dennis Hopper as Rudolph "Red" Diamond
- Lolita Davidovich as Vikki Dunbar
- Viggo Mortensen as Ronnie
- Dan Hedaya as US Treasury Agent Sam Brady
- Seymour Cassel as Virgil Leach
- Jonathan Banks as Max Waxman
- Christine Elise as Carol
- Tony Lo Bianco as Tony Dio
- Valerie Perrine as Mona
- James Tolkan as Senior US Treasury Agent Jerry Levitt
- Paul Gleason as Michael, The Transaction Man
- Lorraine Evanoff as Connie
- Stephanie E. Williams as Sally Mercer
- Tobin Bell as Roth
- Bobby Hosea as Steve
- Al Guarino as US Treasury Agent Sal Russo
- George Gerdes as Henderson
- James Pickens Jr. as Prison Guard
- Jophery Brown as Edmund, The Bar Backup Man
- Rick Dean as The Bartender

== Reception ==
=== Critical response ===
The film earned negative reviews from critics. It currently holds a 17% on Rotten Tomatoes based on 12 reviews. Metacritic, which uses a weighted average, assigned the film a score of 50 out of 100, based on 19 critics, indicating "mixed or average" reviews. Audiences polled by CinemaScore gave the film an average grade of "C−" on an A+ to F scale.

Janet Maslin of The New York Times criticized the film for having "a barely tepid police story" that did nothing to showcase its cast, and is just "a parade of stakeouts, standoffs and shootings, with dialogue that falls back on one-word epithets on those frequent occasions when no one has anything interesting to say." Lawrence Cohn of Variety was critical of Harris' "minimalist direction" and "mechanical screenplay" for trying to recreate the "mood and fine character acting of 1940s film noir" at the expense of "excitement and visual flair", but felt the cast delivered "terrific acting" in spite of the filmmaking, highlighting Hopper for creating "a memorable small-time rogue" in Red Diamond. Kevin Thomas of the Los Angeles Times saw through the film's false advertising and called it "a stylish, reflective, deliberately B-scale movie" reminiscent of Howard Hawks' The Big Sleep, praising Hopper's "dominating presence" as Red Diamond as "one of his best portrayals ever," the supporting contributions from Lo Bianco, Hedaya, Cassel, and Banks, and both the musical score and color cinematography for giving the film "a smoky, sophisticated pleasure throughout." He gave note that "action fans will be disappointed while those who are looking for witty adult entertainment that offers the pleasures of film noir classics will be put off by the ads."
