= The Quality of the Informant =

1985 novel by Gerald Petievich

- First edition
- Author: Gerald Petievich
- Language: English
- Genre: Crime fiction
- Publisher: Arbor House
- Publication date: January 1, 1985
- Publication place: United States
- Media type: Print (hardcover)
- Pages: 240
- ISBN: 978-0877956198
- Preceded by: To Live and Die in L.A.

The Quality of the Informant is a 1985 crime novel by Gerald Petievich. It is the fourth novel in the author's "Charles Carr" series, about the exploits of a federal agent in Southern California. The other novels in the series include Money Men, One-Shot Deal, and To Die in Beverly Hills.

== Plot ==
After a tipoff by an informant, a Treasury agent pursues a wanted counterfeiter.

== Critical reception ==
The novel received strong reviews. Kirkus Reviews called it "strong on seedy backgrounds, credible legwork, and terse violence." The New Yorker wrote that "the pace ... approaches the speed of light, and Mr. Petievich's way with the slimiest of slimy people in the seediest of seedy settings is fully up to standard."

The San Diego Union-Tribune determined that "Petievich reveals some of the fascinating scams generated in underworld circles and does it within the context of a precisely planned, tightly executed plot." The Philadelphia Inquirer stated: "One of the most observant writers in the trade, he can make any criminal setting quicken to life, from a sleazy underworld bar in Ensenada to a corporate board room in Houston."

== Influence ==
The Routledge Dictionary of Modern American Slang and Unconventional English co-credited The Quality of the Informant with helping to popularize the phrase hang paper, which describes the passing of counterfeit money.
