= The Sentinel (2006 film) =

2006 action thriller film directed by Clark Johnson

- Theatrical release poster
- Directed by: Clark Johnson
- Screenplay by: George Nolfi
- Based on: The Sentinel by Gerald Petievich
- Produced by: Michael Douglas; Marcy Drogin; Arnon Milchan
- Starring: Michael Douglas; Kiefer Sutherland; Eva Longoria; Martin Donovan; Kim Basinger
- Cinematography: Gabriel Beristain
- Edited by: Cindy Mollo
- Music by: Christophe Beck
- Production companies: Regency Enterprises; Furthur Films; New Regency Productions; Dune Entertainment
- Distributed by: 20th Century Fox
- Release date: April 21, 2006
- Running time: 108 minutes
- Country: United States
- Language: English
- Budget: $60 million
- Box office: $78.8 million

The Sentinel is a 2006 American political action thriller film directed by Clark Johnson about a veteran United States Secret Service special agent who is suspected of treason after an attempted assassination of the president reveals that someone within the Service is supplying information to the assassins.

The film stars Michael Douglas as the veteran agent, Kiefer Sutherland as his protégé, Eva Longoria as a rookie Secret Service agent, and Kim Basinger in the role of the First Lady. It is based on the 2003 novel of the same name by former Secret Service Agent Gerald Petievich. It was filmed in Washington, D.C., and in the Canadian cities of Toronto and Kleinburg, Ontario.

The Sentinel was released by 20th Century Fox on April 21, 2006. The film received mixed reviews from critics and grossed $78.8 million against a $60 million budget.

== Plot ==
Pete Garrison is a Secret Service agent and one of the personal bodyguards for the First Lady of the United States Sarah Ballentine, with whom he is having an affair. He is one of the oldest and most experienced agents, having been involved in saving Ronald Reagan's life.

Garrison's close friend and fellow agent Charlie Merriweather is murdered. Garrison discovers from a reliable informant that the killing is linked to an assassination plot against the President. The intelligence reveals the existence of a mole with access to the President's security detail.

The Secret Service Protective Intelligence Division, led by Garrison's estranged friend and former protégé, David Breckinridge, with rookie partner Jill Marin, is investigating the plot. Breckinridge orders every agent to be subjected to a polygraph test.

Meanwhile, the mole discovers Garrison's discussion with the informant and his affair with the First Lady. He attempts to blackmail Garrison by luring him to a coffee shop, a known meeting point for a Colombian cartel. After delaying for some time, Garrison is subjected to the polygraph.

The agent in charge of the Presidential Protective Division, William Montrose, randomly selects the president's means of transport with a coin toss. As the President and first lady visit Camp David, Garrison's informant calls, demanding his payment be made at a shopping mall food court.

Garrison goes to meet him, but disappears in the crowd, and an assassin tries to kill Garrison. Agents pursue the assassin, but he escapes. Simultaneously, the presidential helicopter is shot down by a surface-to-air missile outside of Camp David, although neither the POTUS nor his wife was aboard (owing to Montrose's coin "deciding" to use the motorcade instead).

Garrison failed the polygraph test owing to concealing his affair with the First Lady. Breckinridge confronts and interrogates him at home, pinning him as the prime suspect. The source of rancor between them surfaces: Breckinridge believes Garrison had an affair with his wife, causing the breakup of their marriage, to which Garrison denies.

Garrison escapes capture and conducts his own investigation of the assassination plot. Trying to contact the informant who gave him the tip, he finds he has been killed. In pursuit, Breckinridge gets the drop on Garrison but is unable to kill him, despite having given other agents "shoot to kill" orders.

While using his contacts with sympathetic agents and family members, Garrison tracks down one of the assassins, whom he kills in a firefight. He searches his apartment, finding evidence showing the perpetrators are headed to Toronto to attack the president at a G8 summit. He leaves it in the apartment, telling Marin about it, but the evidence, including the assassin's body, were removed before the Secret Service arrived.

The first lady discloses her affair with Garrison to Breckinridge, revealing why Garrison failed his polygraph test. Together in Toronto, Garrison and Breckinridge learn that the assassins are former KGB operatives hired to kill the president by a Colombian cartel. William Montrose, who was never polygraphed, is the mole and in charge of security at the summit.

The leader of the assassins blackmails Montrose into helping them, threatening his family. Emotionally torn, Montrose is instructed to jam Secret Service's radios and leave the summit with the President via a specific route; the assassins will handle the rest.

On the night of the President's speech, Breckinridge and Garrison race to the summit. The assassins, posing as RCMP Emergency Response Team officers, kill several agents and corner Montrose and the President in a stairwell.

Montrose reveals his treason to the President and purposely steps in front of one of the assassins, who kills him. Garrison, Breckinridge, and Marin arrive, rescuing the President and the First Lady by killing the assassins. As they reach the ground level, Montrose's handler comes forward dressed as an RCMP officer to perform the killings personally. He takes Sarah hostage and aims his pistol at the President, but Garrison shoots him dead.

In spite of these events, Garrison is forced to take early retirement owing to the disclosure of his affair with the first lady, who looks on sadly from her window as he leaves the White House. He does, however, make peace with Breckinridge, who finally realizes that Garrison did not sleep with his wife and has a date with her that evening.

== Cast ==
- Michael Douglas as Secret Service Agent Pete Garrison
- Kiefer Sutherland as Secret Service Agent David Breckinridge
- Eva Longoria as Secret Service Agent Jill Marin
- Martin Donovan as Secret Service Agent William Montrose
- Ritchie Coster as The Handler
- Kim Basinger as First Lady Sarah Ballentine
- Blair Brown as National Security Advisor
- David Rasche as President John Ballentine
- Kristin Lehman as Cindy Breckinridge
- Raynor Scheine as Walter Xavier
- Chuck Shamata as Director Overbrook
- Paul Calderón as Deputy Director Cortes (as Paul Calderon)
- Clark Johnson as Secret Service Agent Charlie Merriweather

== Reception ==
=== Box office ===
In the United States and Canada, The Sentinel grossed $36.3 million, with $42.5 million in other territories, for a worldwide total of $78.8 million, against a budget of $60 million. It opened at No. 3, its first of three consecutive weeks in the Top 10 at the domestic box office.

=== Critical response ===
On the review aggregator website Rotten Tomatoes, 34% of 131 critics' reviews are positive, with an average rating of 5.0/10. The website's consensus reads: "The Sentinel starts off well enough but quickly wears thin with too many plot holes and conventional action sequences." Metacritic, which uses a weighted average, assigned the film a score of 49 out of 100, based on 32 critics, indicating "mixed or average" reviews.

The BBC review described it as being "as compelling as watching the ink dry on a superfluous UN treaty". Kenneth Turan, of the Los Angeles Times, enjoyed the film, while Roger Ebert gave it 3 out of 4 stars.

== DVD and Blu-ray release ==
DVD/Blu-ray Disc title	Region 1	Region 2	Region 4
The Sentinel	August 29, 2006	January 29, 2007	January 24, 2007
