= To Live and Die in L.A. (novel) =

1984 novel by Gerald Petievich

- First edition
- Author: Gerald Petievich
- Language: English
- Genre: Crime fiction
- Publisher: Arbor House
- Publication date: 1984
- Publication place: United States
- Media type: Print (Mass)
- Pages: 278
- ISBN: 9781466219649
- Followed by: The Quality of the Informant

To Live and Die in L.A. is an American crime novel written by former Secret Service Agent Gerald Petievich. It was published by Arbor House in 1984, and subsequently made into a movie the following year.

== Critical reception ==
The New York Times wrote that the book's "characters and plot are straight out of an amiable, time-killing made-for-TV movie ... The bottom line here is that in Lotusland the good guys and the bad guys get all mixed up in the scum, and this world view makes Gerald Petievich's final resolution decidedly ambivalent." The Pittsburgh Press wrote that the book "finally should establish Petievich as a new cult figure for fans of police thrillers." The Akron Beacon Journal called the book a "suspenseful southern-California adventure," writing that it was perhaps Petievich's best.
