= Cherise Bate =

American dancer and actress

Cherise Bate (sometimes credited as Cherise Bates) is an American dancer, actress and teacher whose performance career was most prominent in the late 1970s and early 1980s.

== Early life and education ==
Cherise Cheryl Bate was born on May 15, 1952 in Cleveland, Ohio, to Kenneth and Ruth Bate. She is one of three siblings. Her father was a telephone company supervisor and her mother was the office manager for Allied Records in the City of Commerce, California. She moved with her family to Los Angeles, California, at the age of two. Bate began to dance when her mother enrolled her in a ballet dance school aged eight. She performed her first recital aged 10 at Beverly Hills High School. As a teenager she studied dance with the Nick and Edna Stewart's Ebony Showcase in Los Angeles. Following her time at Los Angeles High School, she would study sociology at Los Angeles City College before transferring to UCLA.

== Career ==
In the early 1970s, Bate became a sought after dancer. She was cast in Guys and Dolls in Las Vegas, in a company that included Clifton Davis, Leslie Uggams, Ruth Brown and Judy Pace. She worked with Uggams again in West Side Story and then Uggams asked her to join her Cotton Club Revue act as one of her four dancers. This act toured the US, Canada and Australia, playing in 1975 at the Thunderbird Hotel in Las Vegas.

Following the Uggams tour, Bate then spent 10 weeks in Monte Carlo and returned home to appear in The Monte Carlo Show in the Aladdin Hotel, Las Vegas, hosted by David Wayne, the son of John Wayne. She then toured Europe with JoJo Smith in The Saturday Night Fever show, appearing in Spain, Italy and France.

Bate then worked with Ralph MacDonald in the Apollo Theater, New York and was cast in NBC's Diamond Jubilee production and following that appeared at the Academy Awards in the Salute to Dancers troupe.

Her first film role came in the 1976 musical drama Sparkle, where she played Zola Taylor, a member of The Platters singing group. She subsequently appeared in the 1979 satirical comedy Americathon. Bate is now perhaps best known for her role as one of the immortal Muses in the 1980 musical Xanadu, her third motion picture, which highlighted her dance abilities. In Xanadu, Bate's hair-do was a distinguishing Top-Knot designed by Flowers, the hair designer and make-up artist. In an interview, Bate recalled that the most thrilling aspect of working on Xanadu was working with Kenny Ortega the choreographer. In the same 1980 featured interview with Sepia magazine, she expressed her preference for live shows and stage performances over television and film.

Bate also worked with renowned director William Friedkin, appearing in his 1985 crime thriller To Live and Die in L.A. That same year, she appeared in the musical drama Copacabana and later appeared in The Color Purple.

In addition to her film work, Bate modeled for and appeared in Popular Photography in 1979.

== Teaching ==
Throughout her career, Bate continued to take lessons with Hymie Rogers in Studio City. In the late 1970s and early 1980s, Bate began teaching children in Dance Wonderland, Los Angeles.

== Personal life ==
Bate was a keen racquet ball player, as well as playing tennis and swimming.
