= Blood on the Moon (novel) =

1984 novel by James Ellroy

- First edition cover
- Author: James Ellroy
- Language: English
- Series: Lloyd Hopkins Trilogy
- Genre: crime fiction
- Publisher: The Mysterious Press
- Publication date: March 1984
- Publication place: United States
- Media type: Print (hardcover & paperback), audio cassette and audio CD
- Pages: 263 pp (first edition, hardcover)
- ISBN: 0-89296-069-8 (first edition, hardcover)
- OCLC: 10685673
- Dewey Decimal: 813/.54 19
- LC Class: PS3555.L6274 B55 1984
- Preceded by: Clandestine (1982)
- Followed by: Because the Night (1984)

Blood on the Moon (1984) is a crime novel by James Ellroy, initially published in the US by The Mysterious Press, with the first UK edition being published by Allison and Busby. Blood on the Moon is the first installment of Ellroy's Lloyd Hopkins Trilogy. It was followed by Because the Night (1984) and Suicide Hill (1985). Although the novels are written in multiple perspectives and narrated omnisciently, the main character in all three is Lloyd Hopkins. Ellroy has stated that Blood on the Moon is his only novel that he is embarrassed by.

== Plot summary ==
The story begins in 1965 during the Watts Riots in Los Angeles, California. 23-year-old Lloyd Hopkins is still with the National Guard and is deployed to help handle the situation. It is during this riot that Hopkins kills his first man, a deranged armory sergeant who was hunting down and killing African Americans.

Eighteen years later, Hopkins is now a sergeant with the LAPD and has the highest number of arrests of any officer in the department's history. He is considered a genius by many of his associates for his uncanny ability to make intuitive leaps of logic when tracking down criminals. Soon his abilities are put to the test when he investigates the brutal murder of a woman who was disemboweled in her apartment. Hopkins quickly deduces that the person responsible for this murder has in fact been killing women since the late 1960s, but has never been caught because he always changes his modus operandi.

A subplot of the novel involves Hopkins' relationship with his family. He adores his three daughters and deeply loves his wife, though he is chronically unfaithful to her. His wife loves Lloyd, but begins to realize that his habits are not healthy for their children, particularly his propensity for telling them about the cases that he has worked on.

== Film adaptation ==
- Blood on the Moon, the first Ellroy novel to be adapted to film, is the basis for the 1988 movie Cop, starring James Woods.
- Actor Tom Hanks, in an October 13, 2017 interview in The New York Times stated that he would be interested in playing the part of Lloyd Hopkins on the stage or screen.
