= Robert Ward (novelist) =

American writer

- Occupations: Novelist; journalist; television writer
- Writing career
- Subject: Crime fiction
- Notable works: Red Baker, Four Kinds of Rain, The King of Cards
- Website: www.robertward.me

Robert Ward is an American writer. He is a native of Baltimore currently living in Los Angeles. Ward has numerous credits as novelist, teacher, journalist, screenwriter, producer, and actor.

== Biography ==
=== Novelist ===
Shedding Skin was published in 1972 after taking five years to complete. Ward worked on it for two years while living in a hippie commune in the Haight-Ashbury district of San Francisco. He destroyed the first draft of the manuscript before moving back to Baltimore where he began working on it once again. In 1968, in the aftermath of the assassination of Martin Luther King Jr., he escaped the North Ave. riots in Baltimore with only his manuscript and guitar before his block was burned down. Some chapters from Shedding Skin were published in the Winter 1970 Carolina Quarterly. Shedding Skin was published by Harper & Row in 1972. After publication it won the National Endowment of the Arts award for first novel of exceptional merit.

Cattle Annie and Little Britches was adapted into a movie in 1981 that was directed by Lamont Johnson. Ward adapted his own novel. It saw some favorable responses from critics, including praise from The New York Times, before being pulled from theaters after only one week.

Red Baker won the PEN West prize for Best Novel, in 1985. It was optioned, with Ward writing the screenplay. David Milch read the screenplay and offered Ward a job on Hill Street Blues. The Blues' episode "Oh You Kid" was based on Ward's pitch.

Grace is a fictional biography of his grandmother, a Baltimore activist in the Civil Rights Movement.

Four Kinds of Rain was a 2006 nominee for the Hammett Prize.

Ward's next novel, Total Immunity, came out in 2009. It was the first book in a series with an F.B.I. protagonist, Agent Jack Harper, which continued in 2012 with The Best Bad Dream.

=== Personal life ===
Robert Ward was born in Baltimore, Maryland. When he was 15 years old he went to live with his paternal grandmother, Grace, a local social activist. He did his undergraduate work at Towson State University before earning his MFA in writing at the University of Arkansas. While living in the Haight-Ashbury district of San Francisco he began working on his first novel, Shedding Skin, before moving back to Baltimore for its completion. He taught English at Miami University in Hamilton, Ohio for two years, then moved to Geneva, New York, where he taught at Hobart and William Smith College. In 1974, he started his career as a journalist, writing for magazines such as New Times and Sport. He moved to New York in 1976 and continued writing "New Journalism" for eight years. During this period, he wrote his novel Cattle Annie and Little Britches as well as the screenplay for the feature film based on the book. After the publication of his fourth novel, Red Baker, in 1985 he was approached by David Milch and offered a job to write for Hill Street Blues. After Hill Street concluded, Ward become the co-Executive Producer of Miami Vice, and spent five years writing scripts and producing TV movies at Universal Studios. He continues to write and produce television shows and movies as well publish novels.

== Published works ==
=== Novels ===
- Shedding Skin (1972)
- Cattle Annie and Little Britches (1977)
- The Sandman (1978)
- Red Baker (1985)
- The King of Cards (1993)
- The Cactus Garden (1995)
- Grace (1998)
- Four Kinds of Rain (2006)
- Total Immunity (2009)
- The Best Bad Dream (2012)
- The Stone Carrier (2019)

=== Nonfiction ===
- Renegades: My Wild Trip from Professor to New Journalist (2012)

== Filmography ==
=== Writer ===
- Cattle Annie and Little Britches
- Hill Street Blues :
  - Episode 6.6 "Oh You Kid"
  - Episode 6.10 "The Virgin and the Turkey"
  - Episode 6.11 "Two Easy Pieces"
  - Episode 6.12 "Say It as it Plays"
  - Episode 6.14 "Scales of Justice"
  - Episode 6.18 "Iced Coffey"
  - Episode 6.21 "Slum Enchanted Evening"
  - Episode 7.3 "The Best Defense"
  - Episode 7.7 "Amazing Grace"
  - Episode 7.8 "Falling From Grace"
  - Episode 7.17 "The Cookie Crumbles"
- Miami Vice :
  - Episode 5.2 "Redemption in Blood: Part 4"
  - Episode 5.7 "Asian Cut"
  - Episode 5.8 "Hard Knocks"
  - Episode 5.11 "Miami Squeeze"
  - Episode 5.12 "Jack of All Trades"
  - Episode 5.15 "Over the Line"
  - Episode 5.19 "Miracle Man"
  - Episode 5.20 "Leap of Faith"
- C.A.T. Squad: Python Wolf
- Brotherhood of the Gun
- Green Dolphin Beat
- New York Undercover :
  - Episode 5.11 – "Olde Thyme Religion"
  - Episode 5.12 – "All in the Family"
  - Episode 5.15 – "You Get No Respect"
  - Episode 5.19 – "Blondes Have More Fun"
