= To Live and Die in L.A. (film) =

1985 film by William Friedkin

- Theatrical release poster
- Directed by: William Friedkin
- Screenplay by: William Friedkin; Gerald Petievich
- Based on: To Live and Die in L.A. (1984 novel) by Gerald Petievich
- Produced by: Irving H. Levin
- Starring: William L. Petersen; Willem Dafoe; John Pankow; Debra Feuer; John Turturro; Darlanne Fluegel; Dean Stockwell
- Cinematography: Robby Müller
- Edited by: M. Scott Smith; Bud S. Smith (sup.)
- Music by: Wang Chung
- Production companies: United Artists; New Century Productions; SLM Production Group
- Distributed by: MGM/UA Entertainment Co.
- Release date: November 1, 1985 (US)
- Running time: 116 minutes
- Country: United States
- Language: English
- Budget: $6 million
- Box office: $17.3 million

To Live and Die in L.A. is a 1985 American neo-noir action thriller film directed and co-written by William Friedkin. It is based on the 1984 novel by former U.S. Secret Service agent Gerald Petievich, who co-wrote the screenplay with Friedkin. It stars William Petersen, Willem Dafoe, John Pankow, John Turturro, Darlanne Fluegel and Dean Stockwell. Wang Chung composed and performed the original music soundtrack. The film tells the story of the lengths to which two Secret Service agents go to arrest a counterfeiter.

The film was released by MGM/UA Entertainment Co. on November 1, 1985. It received generally positive reviews, with critics praising its authenticity and the cinematography by Robby Müller. It was a financial success, grossing $17.3 million from $6 million budget.

William Friedkin referred to the film as one of his favorites of his own works. In 2008, the film was voted by a group of Los Angeles Times staff as one of the best films set in Los Angeles in the previous 25 years.

== Plot ==
After foiling an assassination attempt by an Islamic jihadist on President Reagan, Secret Service agents Richard Chance and Jimmy Hart are assigned as counterfeiting investigators in the Los Angeles field office. Days away from retirement, Hart stakes out a warehouse in the desert used by artist-turned-counterfeiter Eric "Rick" Masters and is killed by Masters and his bodyguard, Jack. Chance, who has earned a reputation for impulsive behavior, vows to his new partner, John Vukovich, that he will take Masters down by any means necessary.

Chance and Vukovich arrest Masters' mule, Carl Cody, after he makes a delivery to attorney Max Waxman, who lies to Masters that he never received the money. The agents place Waxman under surveillance, but he is betrayed by Masters' girlfriend, Bianca, and murdered by Masters. The by-the-book Vukovich is uncomfortable with Chance's increasingly reckless and unethical tactics, while Chance relies on his sexual-extortion relationship with Ruth, an informant on parole whom he threatens to send back to prison.

When Masters attempts to have Cody killed in prison, Chance arranges for his supervised release, but Cody escapes. Vukovich convinces Masters' attorney, Bob Grimes, to arrange a meeting between his client and the two agents, who pose as offshore bankers from Palm Springs seeking $1 million in fake bills. Masters demands $30,000 in front money, which the agency refuses to authorize. Desperate to entrap Masters, Chance persuades Vukovich to aid him in robbing Thomas Ling, a man Ruth learned will be carrying $50,000 to purchase stolen diamonds.

They intercept Ling at Union Station and seize the cash at gunpoint under the Sixth Street Viaduct, but are followed by his associates, who open fire, accidentally killing Ling. After a panicked car chase, Chance and Vukovich finally escape by going the wrong way on the freeway. Their next daily briefing reveals that Ling was an undercover FBI agent, and his associates were an FBI agent detail, but Chance remains determined to avenge Hart and continues their plan, paying Masters and arranging the $1 million exchange. Consumed by guilt, Vukovich meets with Grimes, who advises him to testify against Chance in exchange for a lighter sentence. Vukovich refuses to implicate his partner, who recaptures Cody.

The two agents meet with Masters and Jack for the exchange and attempt to arrest them, but Jack and Chance fatally shoot each other as Masters escapes. Vukovich pursues Masters to his warehouse workshop, where he is burning all evidence of his crimes. Masters asks why Vukovich did not take Grimes' advice to turn his partner in, revealing that Grimes was working on Masters' behalf all along. Subduing Vukovich, Masters covers him with shredded bills to set him on fire, but Vukovich awakens and shoots Masters repeatedly as the counterfeiter burns alive.

Packing up to leave Los Angeles, Ruth is confronted by Vukovich, now dressed much like Chance. She defends her right to keep the remaining $20,000 Chance left her, but Vukovich suggests that she knew Ling was an FBI agent and set Chance up. Embracing Chance's willingness to do "whatever it takes" and assuming his control of Ruth's life, Vukovich declares that she now works for him.

== Cast ==
- William Petersen as Richard Chance
- Willem Dafoe as Eric "Rick" Masters
- John Pankow as John Vukovich
- Debra Feuer as Bianca Torres
- John Turturro as Carl Cody
- Darlanne Fluegel as Ruth Lanier
- Dean Stockwell as Bob Grimes
- Michael Greene as Jim Hart
- Steve James as Jeff Rice
- Robert Downey Sr. as Thomas Bateman (as Robert Downey)
- Christopher Allport as Max Waxman
- Jack Hoar as Jack
- Valentin de Vargas as Judge Filo Cedillo (as Val DeVargas)
- Jane Leeves as Serena (credited as Jane Leaves)
- Gary Cole as Man Chased by Richard
- Thomas F. Duffy as Second Suspect
- Dwier Brown as Doctor
- Cherise Bate as Dancer (as Cherise Bates)
- Michael Chong as Thomas Ling

== Production ==
Director William Friedkin was given Gerald Petievich's novel in manuscript form and found it very authentic. The filmmaker was also fascinated by the "absolutely surrealistic nature" of the job of a Secret Service agent outside Washington, D.C. When the film deal was announced, Petievich was investigated by a rival for a pending office promotion, and felt "a lot of resentment against me for making the movie" and "some animosity against me in the Secret Service" existed, exacerbated by the agent in the Los Angeles field office who suddenly resigned a few weeks after initiating the investigation. SLM Production Group, a tribunal of financiers, worked with Friedkin on a ten-picture, $100 million deal with 20th Century Fox but when the studio was purchased by Rupert Murdoch, one of the financiers pulled the deal and took it to MGM.

=== Casting ===
Friedkin had a $6 million budget to work with while the cast and crew worked for relatively low salaries. As a result, he realized that the film would have no movie stars in it. William Petersen was acting in Canada when asked to fly to New York City and meet with the director. Half a page into his reading, Friedkin told him he had the part. The actor was drawn to the character of Chance as someone who had a badge and a gun and how it not only made him above the law, but also "above life and death in his head". The actor found the experience of being this character and making the film "amazing" and "intoxicating". He called fellow Chicago actor John Pankow and brought him to Friedkin's apartment the day after being cast as Chance, recommending him for the role of Vukovich. The director agreed on the spot.

In addition, Gerald Petievich – author of the source novel and, at that time, in his final weeks as a Secret Service agent – along with his then-LAPD brother John and their then-retired LAPD father Zarko, were cast in brief cameos as agents.

=== Screenplay ===
The basic plot, characters, and much of the dialogue of the film is drawn from Petievich's novel, but Friedkin added the opening terrorist sequence, the car chase, and clearer, earlier focus on the showdown between Chance and Masters. Petievich said that Friedkin wrote a number of scenes but when there was a new scene or a story needing to be changed, that he, Petievich, wrote it. The director admits that Petievich created the characters and situations and that he used a lot of dialogue but that he wrote the screenplay, not Petievich.

=== Principal photography ===
The director wanted to make an independent film and collaborate with people who could work fast, like cinematographer Robby Müller and his handpicked crew who were non-union members. Friedkin shot everything on location and worked quickly, often using the first take to give a sense of immediacy. He did not like to rehearse but would create situations where the actors thought they were rehearsing a scene when actually they were shooting a take. Friedkin did this just in case he got something he could use. To this end, he let scenes play out and allowed the actors to stay in character and improvise. For example, during the scene where Chance visits Ruthie at the bar where she works, Friedkin allowed Petersen and actress Darlanne Fluegel to devise their own blocking and told Müller, "Just shoot them. Try and keep them in the frame. If they're not in the frame, they're not in the movie. That's their problem."

The shot of Petersen running along the top of the dividers between the terminal's moving sidewalk at the Los Angeles International Airport got the filmmakers into trouble with the airport police. The airport had prohibited this action, mainly for Petersen's safety, as they felt that their insurance would not have covered him had he hurt himself. The actor told Friedkin that they should do the stunt anyway so the director proposed that they treat it like a rehearsal but have the cameras rolling and shoot the scene, angering airport officials.

The counterfeiting montage looks authentic because Friedkin consulted actual counterfeiters who had done time. The "consultant" actually did the scenes that do not show actor Willem Dafoe on camera to give this sequence more authenticity even though the actor learned how to print money. Over one million dollars of counterfeit money was produced but with three deliberate errors so that it could not be used outside the film. The filmmakers burned most of the fake money but some leaked out, was used, and linked back to the production. The son of one of the crew members tried to use some of the prop money to buy candy at a local store and was caught. Three FBI agents from Washington, D.C., interviewed 12–15 crew members including Friedkin, who screened the workprint for them. He offered to show the film to the Secretary of the Treasury and take out anything that was a danger to national security. That was the last he heard from the government.

The wrong-way car chase on a Los Angeles freeway sequence was one of the last things shot in the film and it took six weeks to shoot. At this point, Friedkin was working with a very stripped-down crew. He came up with the idea of staging the chase against the flow of traffic on February 25, 1963, when he was driving home from a wedding in Chicago. He fell asleep at the wheel and woke up in the wrong lane with oncoming traffic heading straight for him. He swerved back to his side of the road and for the next 20 years wondered how he was going to use it in a film. He told stunt coordinator Buddy Joe Hooker that if they could come up with a chase better than the one in The French Connection then it would be in the film. If not, he would not use it. Petersen did a lot of his own driving during this sequence and actor John Pankow's stressed-out reactions were real. Three weekends were spent on sections of the Terminal Island Freeway near Wilmington, California, that were closed for four hours at a time to allow the crew to stage the chaotic chase. With delays, the film ran a reported $1 million over budget. Adding to the chaotic feeling of the chase, Friedkin staged it so that the freeway traffic flow was reversed. That is that the normal traffic in the scene has the drivers driving on their left in the left hand lanes (as in Britain) while the cars driving against the flow were driving on their right (as would be usual in North America).

In reference to a sex sequence between William Petersen and Darlanne Fluegel, director William Friedkin revealed to have told the actors to "make it as real as possible. Make it real".

=== Soundtrack ===
According to Friedkin, the main reason he chose Wang Chung to compose the soundtrack was because the band "stands out from the rest of contemporary music ... What they finally recorded has not only enhanced the film, it has given it a deeper, more powerful dimension". He wanted them to compose the score for his film after listening to the band's previous studio album, Points on the Curve (1984). He was so taken with the album that he took one of the songs straight off the album, "Wait", and used it as part of the soundtrack. "Wait" plays at the end credits of the film. Every song on the soundtrack, excluding the title song and "Wait", was written and recorded within a two-week period. Only after Wang Chung saw a rough cut of the film did they produce the title song.

=== Post-production ===
As early as the day he cast Petersen, Friedkin thought about killing off Chance towards the end of the film. However, according to editor Bud Smith, Vukovich was supposed to be the one who got killed. The climactic scene in which Chance is killed was not well received by MGM executives, who considered it overly negative. To satisfy the studio heads, Friedkin shot a second ending wherein Chance survives the shotgun blast. He is then transferred, along with Vukovich, to a remote Secret Service station in Alaska ostensibly because of a manpower shortage. From there both watch their boss, Thomas Bateman, being interviewed on television - and taking credit for the apprehension of Masters. Friedkin previewed the alternate ending and kept the original.

== Release ==
=== Theatrical ===
The film was released by MGM/UA Entertainment Co. in North American and Asia-Pacific markets on November 1, 1985, with an opening weekend theater count of 1,135.

=== Home media ===
A DVD was released by MGM Home Entertainment on December 2, 2003. The DVD contains a new restored wide-screen transfer, an audio commentary featuring director Friedkin where he relates stories about the making of the movie, a half-hour documentary featuring the main characters, a deleted scene showing a distraught Vukovich bothering his soon-to-be ex-wife at her apartment, and the alternate ending Friedkin refused to use, in which the two Secret Service partners survive but are transferred to Alaska while their supervisor Bateman is promoted and takes credit for stopping Masters. On February 2, 2010, the film was released on Blu-ray not containing all of the previous special features that were included on the DVD release.

On November 21, 2016, Arrow Video released a Region B Blu-ray edition with the old features and new features with the composer, stunt co-ordinator, William Petersen, Debra Feuer and Dwier Brown. On November 22, 2016, Shout! Factory released a Collector's Edition, restoring the original DVD's special features and adding new ones. Kino Lorber released the movie on Ultra HD Blu-ray and Blu-ray on July 18, 2023.

=== Soundtrack ===
An original motion picture soundtrack was released on September 30, 1985, by Geffen Records. The album contained eight tracks. The album's title song, "To Live and Die in L.A.", (with a music video also directed by Friedkin), made it on the Billboard Hot 100 where it peaked at No. 41 in the United States.

== Reception ==
=== Box-office ===
In the United States and Canada, To Live and Die in L.A. grossed $17.3 million, against a production budget of $6 million. Released November 1, 1985, it opened at No. 2 behind Death Wish 3 and spent five consecutive weeks in the Top 10 at the domestic box office.

=== Critical response ===
On the review aggregator website Rotten Tomatoes, 89% of 55 critics' reviews are positive, with an average rating of 7.2/10. The website's consensus reads: "With coke fiends, car chases, and Wang Chung galore, To Live and Die in L.A. is perhaps the ultimate '80s action/thriller." Metacritic, which uses a weighted average, assigned the film a score of 81 out of 100, based on 16 critics, indicating "universal acclaim".

Roger Ebert, film critic for the Chicago Sun-Times, gave the film four out of four stars, praising the car chase and calling the film "first-rate". This sentiment was echoed by writer David Ansen of Newsweek, writing "Shot with gritty flamboyance by Robby Muller, cast with a fine eye for fresh, tough-guy faces, To Live and Die in L.A. may be fake savage, but it's fun".

Others were more dismissive of the film, with critic Janet Maslin writing "Today, in the dazzling, superficial style that Mr. Friedkin has so thoroughly mastered, it's the car chases and shootouts and eye-catching settings that are truly the heart of the matter". The staff at Variety partially agreed with this sentiment, calling the film over the top in their mixed review saying "[E]ngrossing and diverting enough on a moment-to-moment basis but is overtooled ... what conversation there is proves wildly overloaded with streetwise obscenities, so much so that it becomes something of a joke".

In a scathingly negative review for the film, The Washington Post's Paul Attanasio predicted box office failure, saying the picture would "live briefly and die quickly in L.A., where God hath no wrath like a studio executive with bad grosses... [it is]... overheated and recklessly violent", dismissing it with sarcasm as not even living up to the "high standard established by Starsky and Hutch". This feeling was shared by Time Magazine, who wrote about the film's "brutal, bloated car-chase sequence pilfered from Friedkin's nifty The French Connection", and called it "a fetid movie hybrid: Miami Vile".

William Friedkin singled out the movie as one of his favorites: "I love the film, and I value my films or don’t value them in a different way. When I think of them in terms of success, I think of how close I came to my original vision of it. The two films where I came extremely close were To Live and Die in L.A. and Sorcerer.

The car chase featured in the film has consistently been ranked among the best car chase sequences on film, often appearing alongside The French Connection (another Friedkin directed film), The Seven-Ups, The Blues Brothers, Ronin and Bullitt. In 2025, The Hollywood Reporter listed To Live and Die in L.A. as having the best stunts of 1985.

=== Accolades ===
Wins

- Cognac Festival du Film Policier: Audience Award; William Friedkin; 1986.
- Stuntman Awards: Stuntman Award; Best Feature Film Vehicular Stunt, Dick Ziker and Eddy Donno; Most Feature Film Spectacular Sequence, Dick Ziker; 1986.
- Saturn Awards: Best 4K Home Media Release award; 2024.

== Proposed television series ==
In 2015, William Friedkin announced plans to develop a TV series based on the movie for WGN America. This show was never put into production, and in 2021 WGN was converted into a general news network.
