= Los Angeles Rams all-time roster =

The Los Angeles Rams all-time roster is split by name into the following two lists:

- Los Angeles Rams all-time roster (A–Kin)
- Los Angeles Rams all-time roster (Kir–Z)
