= Suicide Hill =

1986 novel by James Ellroy

- Author: James Ellroy
- Language: English
- Series: Lloyd Hopkins Trilogy
- Genre: Novel, crime fiction
- Publisher: The Mysterious Press
- Publication date: 1986
- Publication place: United States
- Media type: Print
- Pages: 280 pp
- ISBN: 978-0-89296-235-8 (first edition, hardcover)
- OCLC: 12421070
- Preceded by: Because the Night (novel) (1984)
- Followed by: Killer on the Road (1986)

Suicide Hill is a crime fiction novel written by James Ellroy. Released in 1986, it is the third and final installment of the Lloyd Hopkins Trilogy.

In the 1993 documentary James Ellroy: The Demon Dog of American Literature, Ellroy states that Suicide Hill is the Hopkins novel he is the most proud of.

In an October 13, 2017 interview, actor Tom Hanks stated that he would be interested in playing the part of Lloyd Hopkins if a film or stage adaptation was to be put into production.

== Plot summary ==
The novel begins with a psychiatrist's assessment recommending that Hopkins be immediately retired from duty with a full pension following the events of Because the Night (1984).

Hopkins eludes compulsory retirement with attachment as LAPD liaison officer to an FBI bank robbery investigation. Hopkins then manipulates his way into robbery/homicide investigations. The novel's story line and characters twist and turn.
