= Dennis Cleveland Stewart =

American actor (1947–1994)

- Born: July 29, 1947; Los Angeles, California, U.S.
- Died: April 20, 1994 (aged 46); Los Angeles, California, U.S.
- Occupations: Actor, dancer
- Years active: 1977–1994

Dennis Cleveland Stewart (July 29, 1947 – April 20, 1994) was an American actor and dancer. He was best known for his work in the films Grease (1978), and Grease 2 (1982), and Sgt Pepper's Lonely Hearts Club Band (1978).

== Early life ==
Stewart was born in Los Angeles, California on July 29, 1947.

== Career ==
Dennis was known for playing Leo "Craterface" Balmudo, the Scorpions' gang leader in Grease (1978), and reprised the role in Grease 2 (1982). He also appeared as a dancer in Sgt Pepper's Lonely Hearts Club Band, highly visible in the Maxwell's Silver Hammer scene with Steve Martin. Dennis was also a boy in Goldie Hawn's TV Special (1978).

== Death ==
Stewart was diagnosed with HIV in 1993 and died from pneumonia as a result of complications from AIDS in 1994.

Stewart was buried at Rose Hills Memorial Park Whittier, Los Angeles County, California, USA along with his mother Evelyn M. Stewart.

== Filmography ==
=== Film ===
| Year | Title | Role | Other notes |
|---|---|---|---|
| 1977 | Pete's Dragon | Fisherman | Uncredited |
| 1978 | Grease | Leo, Scorpions member | Billed as Dennis C. Stewart |
| 1978 | Sgt Pepper's Lonely Hearts Club Band | Dancer #27 | Cameo |
| 1979 | Elvis | | TV movie |
| 1981 | Zoot Suit | Swabbie | |
| 1982 | Grease 2 | Balmudo | Billed as Dennis C. Stewart |
| 1983 | D.C. Cab | Ski Mask Hoodlum | Aka Street Fleet |
| 1988 | Police Story: Cop Killer | Ronnie Sample | TV movie |
| 1988 | Cop | Lawrence "Birdman" Henderson | |
| 1990 | Fatal Charm | Moody | Direct-to-video |

=== Television ===
| Year | Title | Role | Other note |
|---|---|---|---|
| 1978 | Goldie Hawn's TV Special | Chorus Boy | |
| 1981 | CHiPs | Starkey | Episode: "Weed Wars" |
| 1980 | Angie | Dance Instructor | Episode: "Theresa's Gigolo" |
| 1983 | The Greatest American Hero | Lenny | Episode: "It's Only Rock and Roll" |
| 1985 | Trapper John, M.D. | Drunk | Episode: "Bad Breaks" |
| 1985 | Moonlighting | Blond Mohawk | Episode: "Pilot" |
| 1985 | Hunter | Goon with Mohawk | Episode: "The Snow Queen: Part 2" |
| 1985 | Misfits of Science | Taggart | Episode: "Steer Crazy" |
| 1986 | The A-Team | Kid | Episode: "Waiting for Insane Wayne" |
| 1986 | Cagney & Lacey | Double D | Episode: "Act of Conscience" |
| 1986 | Alfred Hitchcock Presents | Thief #2 | Episode: "Four O'Clock" |
| 1986 | MacGyver | Tom | Episode: "Three for the Road" |
| 1989 | Jesse Hawkes | Chino Kane | Episode: "Eddy Street" |
| 1991 | Parker Lewis Can't Lose | Cellmate / Mean Guy | Episodes: "Randall Without a Cause", "Obscene and Not Heard" (final appearance) |
