= Monticello High School (Florida) =

- Monticello High School (former building)
- U.S. National Register of Historic Places
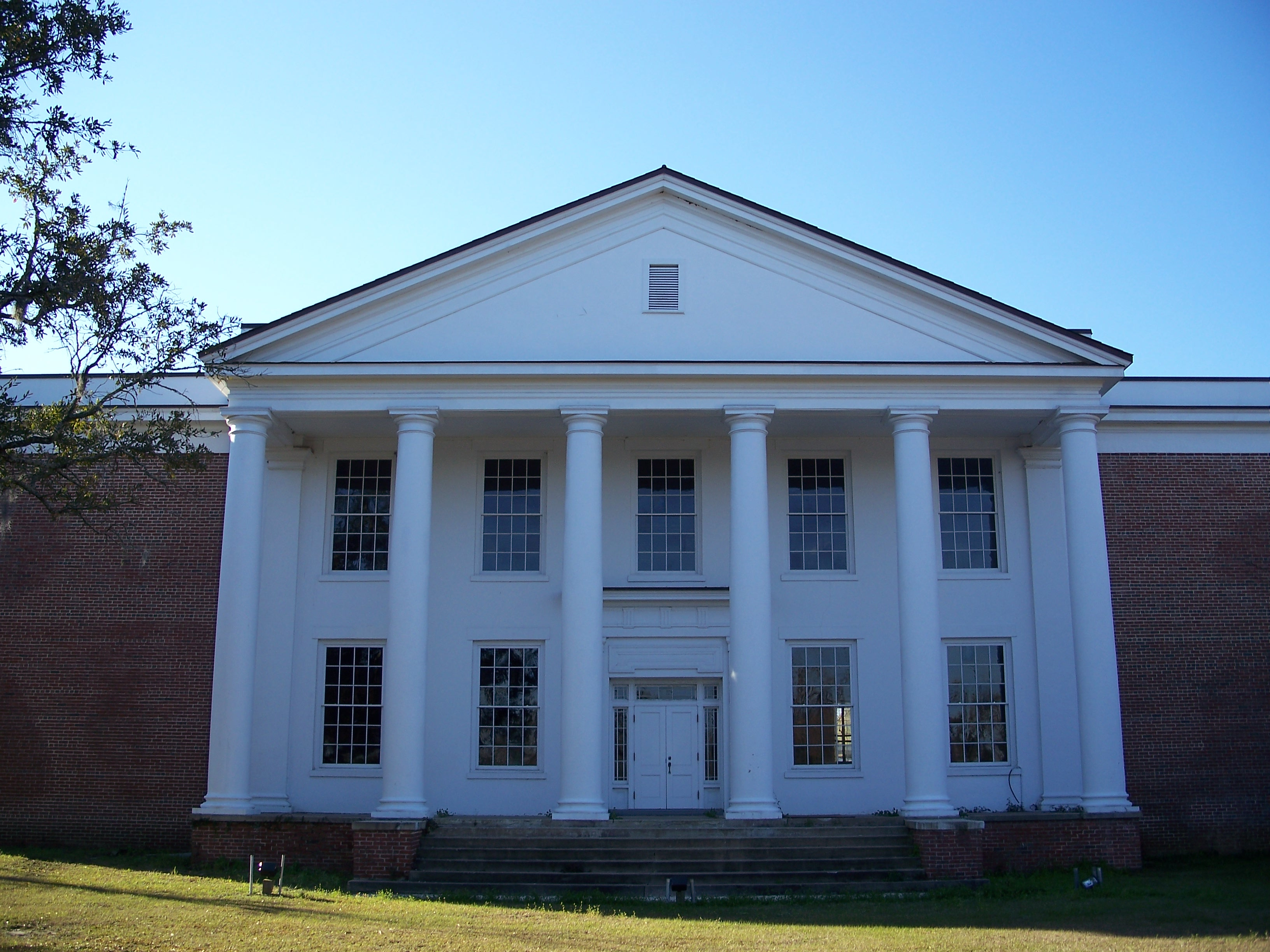
- Location: Monticello
- Coordinates: 30°32′41″N 83°52′23″W
- Built: 1852/1915
- Architectural style: Greek Revival
- NRHP reference No.: 99000373
- Added to NRHP: March 25, 1999

The Monticello High School (also known as the Jefferson Academy and Jefferson County High School) is a historic U.S. school in Monticello, Florida. It is located at 425 West Washington Street. On March 25, 1999, it was added to the U.S. National Register of Historic Places.

== Jefferson Academy ==
Jefferson Academy was established in Monticello in 1852. The school building, described as being the first school built with bricks in Florida, was constructed in 1852 using slave labor. It was designed by Samuel Carroll. Jefferson Academy alumni included William Bailey Lamar.

The school building was used for Jefferson County High School after the academy closed. The school became known as such when the white schools merged into Jefferson County High School.

== Monticello High School ==
Also referred to as Monticello High School, the historic former school building is located at 425 West Washington Street. On March 25, 1999, it was added to the U.S. National Register of Historic Places.

The vernacular school building was expanded on the east and west sides in 1915 and the columns added to the front, giving is a Neoclassical architecture appearance.

By 1980, the original section of the facility was no longer used as a school, and only the addition was. In 2004 the current facility opened. The school district and the county government moved offices into the former facility.
