= Lloyd Hopkins Trilogy =

Trilogy of novels by James Ellroy

The Lloyd Hopkins Trilogy consists of the three crime fiction novels written by James Ellroy: Blood on the Moon (1984), Because the Night (1984) and Suicide Hill (1985).

== Characters ==
The main character in all three novels is Lloyd Hopkins, an LAPD detective. Born in 1942, Hopkins hails from a Silverlake Irish Protestant family. He is very tall and muscular, has an outstanding I.Q., is a sexual addict and sometimes feels entitled to break the law in order to right wrongs. Hopkins can't stand music or other loud noises, and frequently goes for days without sleep while working a hot case.

Motivation to create the character stemmed from Ellroy wanting to create a cop character who harbored both racist and reactionary impulses, but was not defined solely by them. Thomas Harris's Red Dragon was also a huge influence on the character.

Other characters involved in the novels include:

- Janice Marie Rice Hopkins, Lloyd's wife
- Annie, Caroline and Penny, Lloyd and Janice's three daughters
- Arthur "Dutch" Peltz, an older colleague of Lloyd's and his best friend
- LAPD Captain Fred Gaffaney, a born again Christian and an enemy of Hopkins

== Themes ==
In Blood on the Moon and Because the Night, Lloyd Hopkins clears up murders committed by exceptionally intelligent and organised criminals. The villains in Suicide Hill are much more trivial. The novels revolve around an underlying identification between Hopkins and the murderers.

Conversely, because of his own infringements, Hopkins can never solve his cases and have the villains punished lawfully. Completing his investigations also involves confronting and defeating Fred Gaffaney, who wants Hopkins out of the LAPD for his wayward ways. Thematically, all this means that Hopkins can never obtain professional reward or personal recognition for his accomplishments. From a narrative point of view, it means that the line between main plot and subplot is blurred.

Another aim for Hopkins in the novels is to save his marriage. Of his three daughters, he has a special relationship with Penny.

== Legacy ==
As early as 1993, Ellroy has indicated that he did not care for Hopkins or the three novels he appeared in. He even went as far as to say that Blood on the Moon is the only previous work to make him cringe when looking back on it.

Ellroy's take-it-or-leave-it attitude about the character can be seen in the opening to L.A. Noir, an omnibus edition of the three Hopkins novels. Ellroy tells the reader that "I don't care what you think of Hopkins"

Actor Tom Hanks stated that he would be interested in playing Lloyd Hopkins if a film or stage adaptation was to be produced.
