= Gerald Petievich =

American writer

- Born: 1944 (age 81–82); Los Angeles County, California, U.S.
- Education: Defense Language Institute
- Occupations: Secret Service agent; Author
- Writing career
- Genres: Crime fiction; thriller
- Website: petievich.com

Gerald Petievich (born 1944) is an American author of crime fiction, and a former agent of the United States Secret Service.

== Biography ==
Petievich was born in Los Angeles County, California, to a family of Serbian descent. His father and brother were both members of the Los Angeles Police Department. Prior to his law enforcement career, Petievich served in the United States Army as a Counterintelligence officer in West Germany.

=== Secret Service career ===
Petievich joined the United States Secret Service as a Special Agent in 1970, a position he held until 1985. During that time, his assignments included Presidential protection detail, counterfeiting enforcement, and representative to the United States Organized Crime Strike Force in Los Angeles.

=== Writing career ===
Petievich published his first four novels while still employed by the Secret Service. He retired in 1985 to focus on writing full time. That same year, his novel To Live and Die in L.A. was adapted to film by director William Friedkin. Petievich co-wrote the screenplay with Friedkin, and also made a cameo appearance.

Petievich's novels Money Men and The Sentinel have also been adapted to film.

=== Personal life ===
Petievich lives in Los Angeles with his wife.

== Works ==
- Money Men. Pinnacle Books. 1983. ISBN 978-0-523-41154-5.; reprint Penguin Group USA, 1991, ISBN 978-0-451-17052-1
- To Die in Beverly Hills. Arbor House. 1983. ISBN 978-0-87795-487-3.
- One Shot Deal. Gerald Petievich. 1983.; reprint Penguin Group (USA) Incorporated, 1991, ISBN 978-0-451-17046-0
- To Live and Die in LA. Arbor House. 1984. ISBN 978-0-87795-533-7.; Gerald Petievich, 2001, ISBN 978-1-930916-00-5
- The Quality of the Informant. Arbor House. 1985. ISBN 978-0-87795-619-8.
- Shakedown. Simon and Schuster. 1988. ISBN 978-0-671-63154-3. "gerald petievich."
- Earth Angels. New American Library. 1989. ISBN 978-0-453-00680-4.; Gerald Petievich, 2001, ISBN 978-1-930916-15-9
- Paramour. Dutton. 1991. ISBN 978-0-525-93364-9.; Gerald Petievich, 2001, ISBN 978-1-930916-17-3
- The Sentinel. Berkley. 2003. ISBN 978-0-425-18879-8.
