= Bill Kern =

American football player and coach (1906–1985)

- Kern pictured in The Monticola 1941, West Virginia yearbook

Biographical details
- Born: September 3, 1906; Kingston, Pennsylvania, U.S.
- Died: April 5, 1985 (aged 78); Pittsburgh, Pennsylvania, U.S.

Playing career
- 1925, 1927: Pittsburgh
- 1929–1930: Green Bay Packers
- Position: Tackle

Coaching career (HC unless noted)
- 1936: Pittsburgh (assistant)
- 1937–1939: Carnegie Tech
- 1940–1942: West Virginia
- 1943: Del Monte Pre-Flight
- 1946–1947: West Virginia

Head coaching record
- Overall: 43–36–2
- Bowls: 0–1

Accomplishments and honors

Awards
- First-team All-American (1927); AFCA Coach of the Year (1938)

Bill Kern
Profile
- Position: Tackle

Personal information
- Listed height: 6 ft 0 in (1.83 m)
- Listed weight: 187 lb (85 kg)

Career information
- High school: Wyoming Seminary (Kingston, PA)
- College: Pittsburgh

Career history
- 1929–1930: Green Bay Packers

Awards and highlights
- 2× NFL champion (1929, 1930)
- Stats at Pro Football Reference

William Franklin Kern (September 2, 1906 – April 5, 1985) was an American football player and coach. He played college football as a tackle at the University of Pittsburgh in 1925 and 1927 and then with the Green Bay Packers of the National Football League (NFL) in 1929 and 1930. Kern served as the head football coach at the Carnegie Institute of Technology from 1937 to 1939 and at West Virginia University from 1940 to 1942 and again in 1946 and 1947, compiling a career record of 36–35–2. In 1938, he led the Carnegie Tech Tartans to the Sugar Bowl, where they lost to the national champion TCU Horned Frogs, 15–7.

== Playing career ==
As a player in college, he was a first-team All-American tackle at the University of Pittsburgh in 1927. Following college, Kern played tackle for the NFL's Green Bay Packers in 1929 and 1930.

== Coaching career ==
Kern's tenure at West Virginia was interrupted by military service during World War II. He served as a lieutenant commander in the United States Navy from 1943 to 1945.

== Head coaching record ==
Year	Team	Overall	Conference	Standing	Bowl/playoffs	AP^{#}
Carnegie Tech Tartans (Independent) (1937–1939)
1937	Carnegie Tech	2–5–1				
1938	Carnegie Tech	7–2			L Sugar	6
1939	Carnegie Tech	3–5				
Carnegie Tech:		12–12–1				
West Virginia Mountaineers (Independent) (1940–1942)
1940	West Virginia	4–4–1				
1941	West Virginia	4–6				
1942	West Virginia	5–4				
Del Monte Pre-Flight Navyators (Independent) (1943)
1943	Del Monte Pre-Flight	7–1				8
Del Monte Pre-Flight:		7–1				
West Virginia Mountaineers (Independent) (1946–1947)
1946	West Virginia	5–5				
1947	West Virginia	6–4				
West Virginia:		24–23–1				
Total:		43–36–2				
^{#}Rankings from final AP Poll.

== See also ==
- List of college football head coaches with non-consecutive tenure
