= List of Heisman Trophy winners =

Heisman Trophy
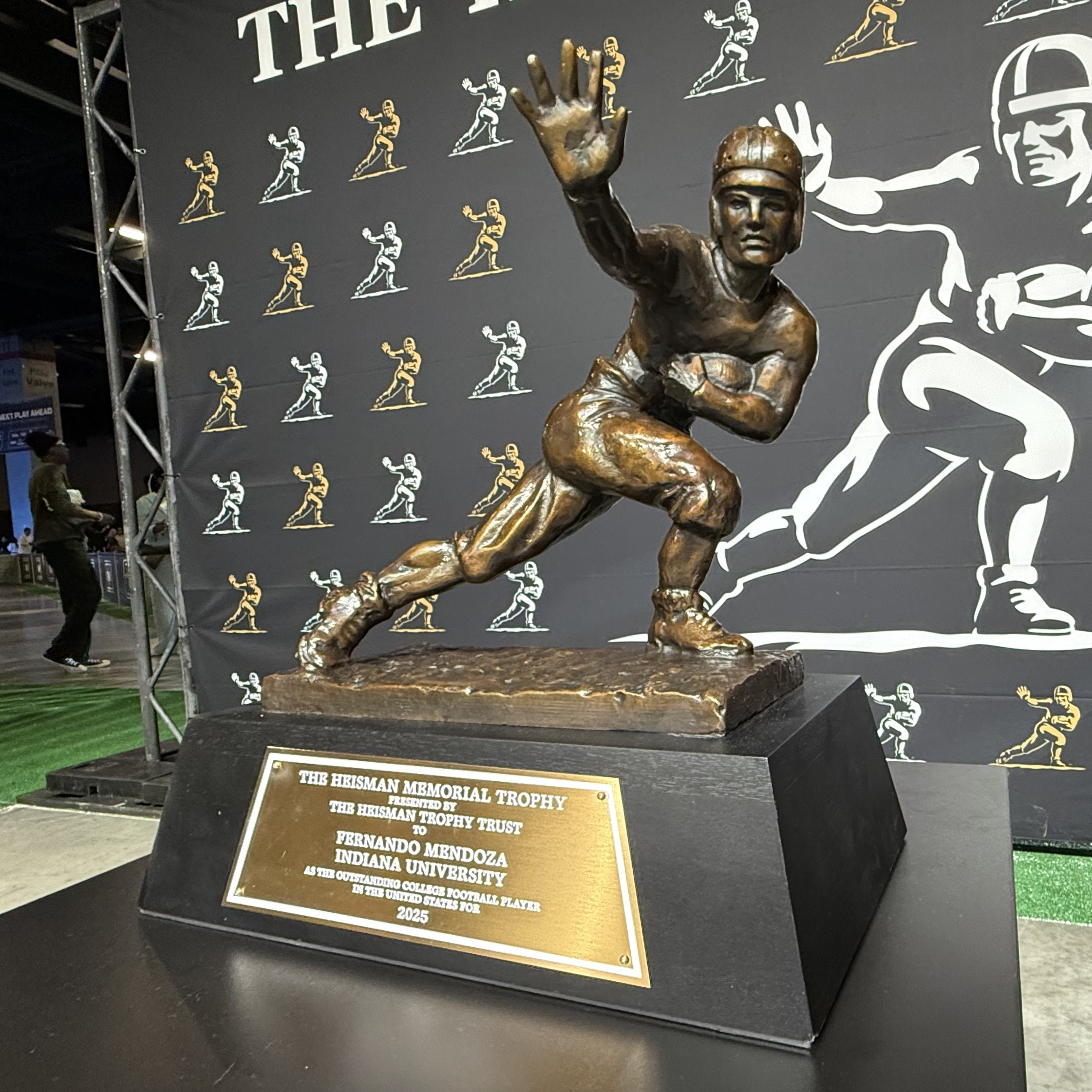
- Awarded for: The outstanding college football player whose performance best exhibits the pursuit of excellence with integrity. Winners epitomize great ability combined with diligence, perseverance, and hard work.
- Presented by: Downtown Athletic Club (1937–2001); Yale Club (2002–2003); The Heisman Trust (2004–present)

History
- First award: HB Jay Berwanger (1935)
- Most recent: QB Fernando Mendoza (2025)

The Heisman Trophy, one of the highest individual awards in American college football, has been awarded annually since its creation in 1935. The trophy is given to the most outstanding college football player in the National Collegiate Athletic Association (NCAA) Division I Football Bowl Subdivision (FBS), and is awarded by the Heisman Trust, successors of the awards from the Downtown Athletic Club at an annual ceremony.

== History ==
The DAC Trophy was established in 1935 by the Downtown Athletic Club in New York City to recognize the best college football player "east of the Mississippi River". In that inaugural year, the award went to Jay Berwanger from the University of Chicago. Berwanger was later drafted by the Philadelphia Eagles of the National Football League but declined to sign with them. He never played professional football for any team, instead choosing to pursue a career in business. In 1936, the club's athletic director, football pioneer John Heisman, died and the trophy was renamed in his honor. Larry Kelley, the second winner of the award, was the first to win it as the "Heisman Trophy". In addition to the name change, the award also became a nationwide achievement. With the new name, players west of the Mississippi became eligible; the first player from the western United States was selected in 1938, TCU quarterback Davey O'Brien.

On June 10, 2010, following several years of investigation, the NCAA announced that USC running back Reggie Bush, the 2005 Heisman trophy winner, received gifts from agents while still in college. The university received major sanctions, and there were reports that the Heisman Trophy Trust would strip his award. In September of that year, Bush voluntarily forfeited his title as the 2005 winner. The Heisman Trust decided to leave the award vacated with no new winner to be announced for the season. Eventually, on April 24, 2024, the Heisman Trust announced the reinstatement of Bush's trophy due to 2021 rule changes regarding player compensation.

A school has had a Heisman winner in back-to-back years six times (Yale 1936–37, Army 1945–46, Ohio State 1974–75, USC 2004–05, Oklahoma 2017–18 and Alabama 2020–21). Only one player, Ohio State's Archie Griffin, has won the award twice. Oklahoma is the only school to have two players win the award in back-to-back years playing the same position (quarterbacks Baker Mayfield followed by Kyler Murray).

Between 1936 and 2001, the award was given at an annual gala ceremony at the Downtown Athletic Club in New York City. The Downtown Athletic Club's facilities were damaged during the September 11, 2001 attacks. Due to financial difficulties stemming from the damage, the DAC declared bankruptcy in 2002, turning over its building to creditors. Following the club's bankruptcy and the loss of the original Downtown Athletic Club building, the Yale Club of New York City assumed presenting honors in 2002 and 2003. The ceremony was moved to the New York Marriott Marquis in Times Square for the 2002, 2003, and 2004 presentations. Between 2005 and 2019, the event was held at PlayStation Theater in Times Square. The move to the PlayStation Theater allowed the Downtown Athletic Club (and ultimately, the award's successor, The Heisman Trust) to resume full control of the event (the most prominent example of which was the return of the official portraits of past winners), despite the loss of the original presentation hall. Shortly after the 2019 ceremony was held, the PlayStation Theater was permanently closed; as a result, the Heisman Trust began searching for a new location to conduct the trophy presentation. The 2020 ceremony would ultimately be held at the studios of ESPN in Bristol, Connecticut due to the COVID-19 pandemic, with the ceremony being held on January 5, 2021.

In terms of balloting, the fifty states of the U.S. are split into six regions (Far West, Mid-Atlantic, Midwest, Northeast, South, Southwest), and six regional representatives are selected to appoint voters in their states. Each region has 145 media votes, for a total of 870 votes. In addition, all previous Heisman winners may vote, and one final vote is counted through public balloting. The Heisman ballots contain a 3–2–1 point system, in which each ballot ranks the voter's top three players and awards them three points for a first-place vote, two points for a second-place vote, and one point for a third-place vote. The points are tabulated, and the player with the highest total of points across all ballots wins the Heisman Trophy.

== List ==
*	First overall pick in the NFL draft
†	Inducted into the Pro Football Hall of Fame
‡	First overall pick and Pro Football Hall of Fame member

Heisman winners
Year	Image	Name	School	Position	Points	% of points possible	Class	Draft position (Note: Unless otherwise noted, these positions are for the NFL draft following their Heisman victory.)	Team drafted by
1935		Jay Berwanger*	Chicago	HB/LB	84	43.1%	Senior	1st	Philadelphia Eagles (Note: Did not play professionally due to a salary dispute)
1936		Larry Kelley	Yale	End	219	36.4%	Senior	87th	Detroit Lions (Note: Rejected offers to play professional football)
1937		Clint Frank	Yale (2)	HB	524	32.9%	Senior	106th	Detroit Lions (Note: Never played professional football)
1938	Davey O'Brien	Davey O'Brien	TCU	QB/DB	519	29.6%	Senior	4th	Philadelphia Eagles
1939	A picture of Nile Kinnick posing.	Nile Kinnick	Iowa	HB/QB	651	31.0%	Senior	14th	Brooklyn Dodgers
1940	Tom Harmon	Tom Harmon*	Michigan	HB	1,303	54.3%	Senior	1st	Chicago Bears
1941		Bruce Smith	Minnesota	HB	554	50.0%	Senior	119th	Green Bay Packers
1942	Frank Sinkwich	Frank Sinkwich*	Georgia	HB	1,059	56.2%	Senior	1st	Detroit Lions
1943		Angelo Bertelli*	Notre Dame	QB	648	64.8%	Senior	1st	Boston Yanks
1944		Les Horvath	Ohio State	HB/QB	412	18.3%	Senior	45th (1943)	Cleveland Rams
1945	Doc Blanchard	Doc Blanchard	Army	FB/LB	860	33.8%	Junior	3rd	Pittsburgh Steelers (Note: Instead opted for a military career)
1946	A picture of Glenn Davis posing.	Glenn Davis	Army (2)	HB	792	79.2%	Senior	2nd (NFL)	Detroit Lions (Note: Also selected by the San Francisco 49ers of the All-America Football Conference (AAFC) with a special selection (order unknown) before that league's regular draft; signed with the Detroit Lions)
1947	A picture of John Lujack	Johnny Lujack	Notre Dame (2)	QB/DB	742	74.2%	Senior	4th (1946)	Chicago Bears
1948	A picture of Doak Walker.	Doak Walker†	SMU	HB	778	28.6%	Junior	3rd (NFL); 69th (AAFC)	New York Bulldogs (NFL) (Note: The New York Bulldogs traded him to the Detroit Lions; signed with the Lions); Cleveland Browns (AAFC)
1949	A picture of Leon Hart.	Leon Hart*	Notre Dame (3)	End	995	36.5%	Senior	1st	Detroit Lions
1950	A picture of Vic Janowicz.	Vic Janowicz	Ohio State (2)	HB/P	633	22.0%	Junior	79th (1952)	Washington Redskins
1951	A picture of Dick Kazmaier.	Dick Kazmaier	Princeton	HB	1,777	60.0%	Senior	176th	Chicago Bears
1952	—	Billy Vessels	Oklahoma	HB	525	14.3%	Senior	2nd	Baltimore Colts (Note: Instead signed with the Edmonton Eskimos of the Western Interprovincial Football Union (WIFU))
1953	A picture of Johnny Lattner playing football.	Johnny Lattner	Notre Dame (4)	HB	1,850	49.1%	Senior	7th	Pittsburgh Steelers
1954	Alan Ameche	Alan Ameche	Wisconsin	FB	1,068	27.0%	Senior	3rd	Baltimore Colts
1955	A picture of Howard Cassady posing.	Howard Cassady	Ohio State (3)	HB	2,219	55.9%	Senior	3rd	Detroit Lions
1956	Top 1961 playing card of Paul Hornung.	Paul Hornung‡	Notre Dame (5)	QB	1,066	27.0%	Senior	1st	Green Bay Packers
1957	A picture of John David Crow posing.	John David Crow	Texas A&M	HB	1,183	31.1%	Senior	2nd	Chicago Cardinals
1958	A picture of Pete Dawkins posing.	Pete Dawkins	Army (3)	HB	1,394	39.0%	Senior	Undrafted	
1959		Billy Cannon*	LSU	HB	1,929	53.7%	Senior	1st (NFL); 2nd (AFL)	Los Angeles Rams (NFL); Houston Oilers (AFL) (Note: Signed with the Houston Oilers of the American Football League (AFL))
1960	Joe Bellino	Joe Bellino	Navy	HB	1,793	52.9%	Senior	227th (NFL); 146th (AFL)	Washington Redskins (NFL); Boston Patriots (NFL) (Note: Signed with the Boston Patriots of the American Football League (AFL))
1961	Davis on Topps trading card	Ernie Davis*	Syracuse	HB/LB/FB	824	25.2%	Senior	1st (NFL); 4th (AFL)	Washington Redskins (NFL) (Note: The Washington Redskins traded him to the Cleveland Browns; signed with the Browns. Died before ever playing in a professional game.); Buffalo Bills (AFL)
1962		Terry Baker*	Oregon State	QB	707	21.3%	Senior	1st (NFL); 90th (AFL)	Los Angeles Rams (NFL) (Note: Signed with the Los Angeles Rams); San Diego Chargers (AFL)
1963		Roger Staubach†	Navy (2)	QB	1,860	55.2%	Junior	129th (NFL); 122nd (AFL)	Dallas Cowboys (NFL) (Note: Signed with the Dallas Cowboys, but did not join them until 1969 due to his four-year military commitment); Kansas City Chiefs (AFL)
1964	—	John Huarte	Notre Dame (6)	QB	1,026	31.0%	Senior	76th (NFL); 12th (AFL)	Philadelphia Eagles (NFL); New York Jets (AFL) (Note: Signed with the New York Jets of the American Football League (AFL))
1965	A picture of Mike Garrett posing.	Mike Garrett	USC	HB	926	26.6%	Senior	18th (NFL); 178th (AFL)	Los Angeles Rams (NFL) (Note: Signed with the Los Angeles Rams); Kansas City Chiefs (AFL)
1966	Steve Spurrier	Steve Spurrier	Florida	QB	1,679	48.3%	Senior	3rd (Note: From 1967 to 1969, the NFL and AFL, still separate leagues, held a common draft; the two leagues officially merged in 1970)	San Francisco 49ers
1967	—	Gary Beban	UCLA	QB	1,968	63.5%	Senior	30th	Los Angeles Rams
1968	A picture of O.J. Simpson posing.	O. J. Simpson‡	USC (2)	HB	2,853	80.6%	Senior	1st	Buffalo Bills (AFL)
1969	A picture of Steve Owens.	Steve Owens	Oklahoma (2)	FB	1,488	40.9%	Senior	19th	Detroit Lions
1970	A picture of Jim Plunkett on a phone.	Jim Plunkett*	Stanford	QB	2,229	58.8%	Senior	1st	New England Patriots
1971	—	Pat Sullivan	Auburn	QB	1,597	42.3%	Senior	40th	Atlanta Falcons
1972	Johnny Rodgers as a Nebraska Cornhuskers	Johnny Rodgers	Nebraska	WR/RB	1,310	38.8%	Senior	25th	San Diego Chargers (Note: Instead signed with the Montreal Alouettes of the Canadian Football League (CFL). He joined the Chargers in 1977.)
1973	John Cappelletti as a Los Angeles Ram	John Cappelletti	Penn State	RB	1,057	32.8%	Senior	11th	Los Angeles Rams
1974	A picture of Archie Griffin on a phone.	Archie Griffin	Ohio State (4, 5)	RB	1,920	59.5%	Junior	24th	Cincinnati Bengals
1975	A picture of Archie Griffin on a phone.	Archie Griffin	Ohio State (4, 5)	RB	1,800	57.6%	Senior	24th	Cincinnati Bengals
1976	A picture of Tony Dorsett on a phone.	Tony Dorsett†	Pittsburgh	RB	2,357	75.0%	Senior	2nd	Dallas Cowboys
1977	A picture of Earl Campbell rushing the ball.	Earl Campbell‡	Texas	RB	1,547	49.1%	Senior	1st	Houston Oilers
1978		Billy Sims*	Oklahoma (3)	RB	827	26.3%	Junior	1st (1980)	Detroit Lions
1979	—	Charles White	USC (3)	RB	1,695	53.8%	Senior	27th	Cleveland Browns
1980	A picture of the George Rogers statue in Columbia, SC	George Rogers*	South Carolina	RB	1,128	35.8%	Senior	1st	New Orleans Saints
1981	A picture of Marcus Allen golfing.	Marcus Allen†	USC (4)	RB	1,797	57.1%	Senior	10th	Los Angeles Raiders
1982	A picture of Herschel Walker posing.	Herschel Walker	Georgia (2)	RB	1,926	61.1%	Junior	114th (1985)	Dallas Cowboys (Note: Instead signed with the New Jersey Generals of the United States Football League (USFL) in 1983. He joined the Cowboys after the USFL folded in 1986.)
1983	A picture of Mike Rozier in 1987.	Mike Rozier	Nebraska (2)	RB	1,801	57.2%	Senior	1st (USFL)	Pittsburgh Maulers (USFL) (Note: Also selected by the Houston Oilers second overall in the 1984 supplemental draft, joining them in 1985)
1984	A picture of Doug Flutie posing.	Doug Flutie	Boston College	QB	2,240	71.1%	Senior	285th	Los Angeles Rams (Note: Instead signed with the New Jersey Generals of the United States Football League (USFL). After the USFL folded in 1986, the Rams traded his rights to the Chicago Bears)
1985	Bo Jackson	Bo Jackson*	Auburn (2)	RB	1,509	47.9%	Senior	1st	Tampa Bay Buccaneers (Note: Instead opted to play baseball, signing with the Kansas City Royals of the American League; was re-drafted by the Los Angeles Raiders 183rd overall in the 1987 NFL draft, playing with the Raiders part-time and the Royals full-time)
1986	Vinny Testaverde	Vinny Testaverde*	Miami (FL)	QB	2,213	70.3%	Senior	1st	Tampa Bay Buccaneers
1987	A picture of Tim Brown wearing a jersey.	Tim Brown†	Notre Dame (7)	WR	1,442	45.8%	Senior	6th	Los Angeles Raiders
1988	A picture of Barry Sanders posing.	Barry Sanders†	Oklahoma State	RB	1,878	68.3%	Junior	3rd	Detroit Lions
1989	A picture of Andre Ware wearing pads.	Andre Ware	Houston	QB	1,073	39.0%	Junior	7th	Detroit Lions
1990	A picture of Ty Detmer wearing a button down.	Ty Detmer	BYU	QB	1,482	53.9%	Junior	230th (1992)	Green Bay Packers
1991	A picture of Desmond Howard with Heisman Trophy statuette.	Desmond Howard	Michigan (2)	WR/PR	2,077	75.5%	Junior	4th	Washington Redskins
1992	A picture of Gino Torreta posing.	Gino Torretta	Miami (FL) (2)	QB	1,400	50.8%	Senior	192nd	Minnesota Vikings
1993	A picture of Charlie Ward wearing a football uniform.	Charlie Ward	Florida State	QB	2,310	83.8%	Senior	Undrafted (Note: Instead opted for a basketball career, and was drafted 26th in the 1994 NBA draft by the New York Knicks)	
1994		Rashaan Salaam	Colorado	RB	1,743	63.2%	Junior	21st	Chicago Bears
1995	A picture of Eddie George wearing sunglasses.	Eddie George	Ohio State (6)	RB	1,460	52.8%	Senior	14th	Houston Oilers
1996	Danny Wuerffel	Danny Wuerffel	Florida (2)	QB	1,363	49.4%	Senior	136th	New Orleans Saints
1997	Charles Woodson	Charles Woodson†	Michigan (3)	CB	1,815	65.7%	Junior	4th	Oakland Raiders
1998	A picture of Ricky Williams while playing for the Dolphins.	Ricky Williams	Texas (2)	RB	2,355	85.2%	Senior	5th	New Orleans Saints
1999	Ron Dayne in 2010.	Ron Dayne	Wisconsin (2)	RB	2,042	73.8%	Senior	11th	New York Giants
2000	A picture of Chris Weinke at a podium.	Chris Weinke	Florida State (2)	QB	1,628	58.9%	Senior	106th	Carolina Panthers
2001		Eric Crouch	Nebraska (3)	QB	770	27.8%	Senior	95th	St. Louis Rams
2002	A picture of Carson Palmer playing for the Raiders.	Carson Palmer*	USC (5)	QB	1,328	48.0%	Senior	1st	Cincinnati Bengals
2003	A picture of Jason White while with the Sooners.	Jason White	Oklahoma (4)	QB	1,481	53.5%	Senior	Undrafted (2005)	
2004	A picture of Matt Leinart holding his Heisman trophy.	Matt Leinart	USC (6)	QB	1,325	47.9%	Junior	10th (2006)	Arizona Cardinals
2005	Reggie Bush	Reggie Bush	USC (7)	RB	2,541	91.8%	Junior	2nd	New Orleans Saints
2006	Troy Smith	Troy Smith	Ohio State (7)	QB	2,540	91.6%	Senior	174th	Baltimore Ravens
2007	A picture of Tim Tebow throwing a pass.	Tim Tebow	Florida (3)	QB	1,957	70.5%	Sophomore	25th (2010)	Denver Broncos
2008	Sam Bradford	Sam Bradford*	Oklahoma (5)	QB	1,726	62.1%	Sophomore	1st (2010)	St. Louis Rams
2009	A picture of Mark Ingram at the White House.	Mark Ingram II	Alabama	RB	1,304	47.0%	Sophomore	28th (2011)	New Orleans Saints
2010	Cam Newton	Cam Newton*	Auburn (3)	QB	2,263	81.6%	Junior	1st	Carolina Panthers
2011	A picture of Robert Griffin smiling.	Robert Griffin III	Baylor	QB	1,687	60.7%	Junior	2nd	Washington Redskins
2012	A picture of Johnny Manziel in 2015.	Johnny Manziel	Texas A&M (2)	QB	2,029	72.9%	Freshman	22nd (2014)	Cleveland Browns
2013	A picture of Jameis Winston while shaking someone's hand.	Jameis Winston*	Florida State (3)	QB	2,205	79.1%	Freshman	1st (2015)	Tampa Bay Buccaneers
2014	Marcus Mariota	Marcus Mariota	Oregon	QB	2,534	90.9%	Junior	2nd	Tennessee Titans
2015	Henry in the NFL.	Derrick Henry	Alabama (2)	RB	1,832	65.7%	Junior	45th	Tennessee Titans
2016	Lamar Jackson	Lamar Jackson	Louisville	QB	2,144	79.5%	Sophomore	32nd (2018)	Baltimore Ravens
2017	Mayfield at 2017 Big 12 Media Days	Baker Mayfield*	Oklahoma (6)	QB	2,398	86.0%	Senior	1st	Cleveland Browns
2018	Murray with Texas Tech	Kyler Murray*	Oklahoma (7)	QB	2,167	77.8%	Junior	1st	Arizona Cardinals
2019		Joe Burrow*	LSU (2)	QB	2,608	93.8%	Senior	1st	Cincinnati Bengals
2020	DeVonta Smith	DeVonta Smith	Alabama (3)	WR	1,856	66.8%	Senior	10th	Philadelphia Eagles
2021	Bryce Young posing	Bryce Young*	Alabama (4)	QB	2,311	83.0%	Sophomore	1st (2023)	Carolina Panthers
2022	Williams in 2021	Caleb Williams*	USC (8)	QB	2,031	72.9%	Sophomore	1st (2024)	Chicago Bears
2023	Jayden Daniels	Jayden Daniels	LSU (3)	QB	2,029	72.9%	Senior	2nd	Washington Commanders
2024	Travis Hunter	Travis Hunter	Colorado (2)	CB/WR	2,231	80.1%	Junior	2nd	Jacksonville Jaguars
2025		Fernando Mendoza*	Indiana	QB	2,362	84.7%	Junior	1st	Las Vegas Raiders

== By school ==
This is a list of the colleges and universities who have had a player win a Heisman trophy. USC has the most trophies with eight. Ohio State has the distinction of the only two-time winner, Archie Griffin. In total, players from 41 schools have won a Heisman Trophy, while 20 schools have more than one trophy.

School	Trophies
USC	8
Notre Dame	7
Ohio State	7
Oklahoma	7
Alabama	4
Army	3
Auburn	3
Florida	3
Florida State	3
LSU	3
Michigan	3
Nebraska	3
Colorado	2
Georgia	2
Miami (FL)	2
Navy	2
Texas	2
Texas A&M	2
Wisconsin	2
Yale	2
Baylor	1
BYU	1
Boston College	1
Chicago	1
Houston	1
Indiana	1
Iowa	1
Louisville	1
Minnesota	1
Oklahoma State	1
Oregon	1
Oregon State	1
Penn State	1
Pittsburgh	1
Princeton	1
South Carolina	1
SMU	1
Stanford	1
Syracuse	1
TCU	1
UCLA	1

== By position ==
This is how many Heisman Trophies have been won by players in each position.

Position	1961 and prior	1962 and later	Total
CB	0	1	1
CB/WR	0	1	1
End	2	0	2
FB	2	1	3
HB	15	2	17
HB/LB/FB	1	0	1
HB/P	1	0	1
HB/QB	2	0	2
QB	4	35	39
RB	0	20	20
WR	0	3	3
WR/PR	0	1	1

== Retroactive selections ==
In 2009, the National Football Foundation (NFF) retroactively selected Heisman Trophy winners for the years between 1889 and 1934. The selections were made by sportswriter and NFF historian Dan Jenkins and published by the NFF.

Year	Image	Name	School	Position
1889		Amos Alonzo Stagg	Yale	E
1890		Pudge Heffelfinger	Yale	G
1891		Lee McClung	Yale	HB
1892		Marshall Newell	Harvard	T
1893		Frank Hinkey	Yale	E
1894		Frank Butterworth	Yale	FB
1895		George H. Brooke	Penn	FB
1896		Addison Kelly	Princeton	HB
1897		John Outland	Penn	T
1898		Clarence Herschberger	Chicago	FB
1899		Truxtun Hare	Penn	G/FB
1900		Charles Dudley Daly	Harvard	QB
1901		Harold Weekes	Columbia	HB
1902		Paul Bunker	Army	FB
1903		John DeWitt	Princeton	G
1904		Willie Heston	Michigan	HB
1905		Tom Shevlin	Yale	E
1906		Walter Eckersall	Chicago	QB
1907		Germany Schulz	Michigan	C
1908		Doc Fenton	LSU	QB
1909		Ted Coy	Yale	FB
1910		John McGovern	Minnesota	QB
1911		Jim Thorpe	Carlisle	FB
1912		Hobey Baker	Princeton	HB
1913		Charles Brickley	Harvard	FB
1914		Eddie Mahan	Harvard	FB
1915		Bart Macomber	Illinois	HB
1916		Elmer Oliphant	Army	FB
1917		Chic Harley	Ohio State	HB
1918		Pete Henry	Washington & Jefferson	T
1919		Chic Harley	Ohio State	HB
1920		George Gipp	Notre Dame	FB
1921		Bo McMillin	Centre	HB
1922		Brick Muller	California	E
1923		George Pfann	Cornell	QB
1924		Red Grange	Illinois	HB
1925		Ernie Nevers	Stanford	FB
1926		Benny Friedman	Michigan	QB
1927		Morley Drury	USC	QB
1928		Chris Cagle	Army	HB
1929		Bronko Nagurski	Minnesota	FB
1930		Frank Carideo	Notre Dame	QB
1931		Gaius Shaver	USC	QB
1932		Harry Newman	Michigan	QB
1933		Beattie Feathers	Tennessee	HB
1934		Don Hutson	Alabama	E
