= List of first overall NFL draft picks =

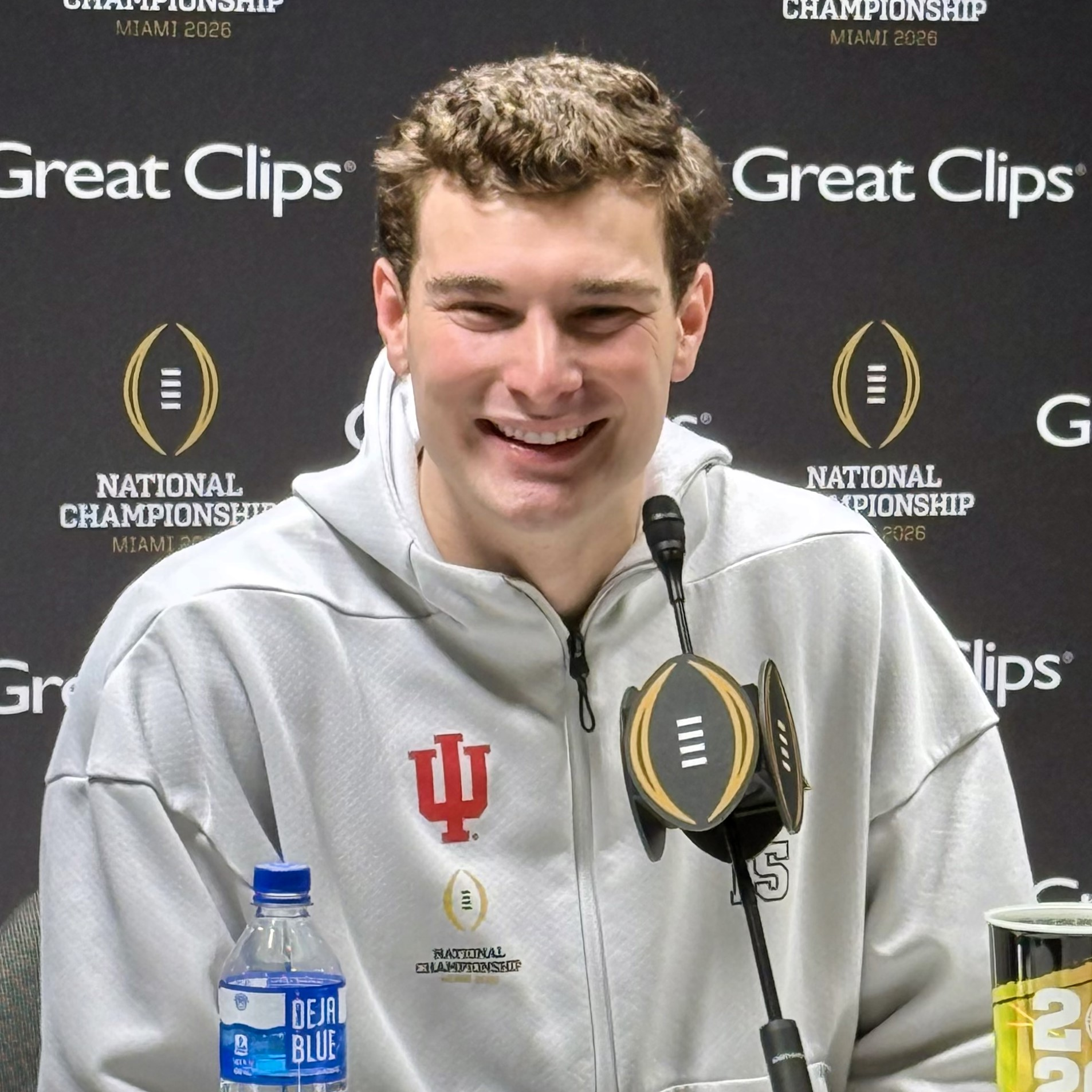
Fernando Mendoza was selected first overall by the Las Vegas Raiders in 2026

The NFL draft is an annual sports draft in which National Football League (NFL) teams select newly eligible players for their rosters. To be eligible for the NFL draft, a player must be at least three years removed from high school. While the regulations have to explicitly need collegiate attendance, players must either exhaust their college eligibility or seek a special exemption from the league. Each NFL franchise seeks to add new players through the draft as it is the league's most common source of player recruitment. Each team is assigned a position in the drafting order based on the reverse of its record from the previous year. The team with the worst record selects first, followed by the team with the second-worst record, and so forth. Teams also have the option to trade with another team to move up to a better draft position. Teams that did not make the playoffs are ordered by their regular-season record, with any remaining ties broken by strength of schedule. Playoff participants are sequenced after non-playoff teams, based on their round of elimination (wild card, division, conference, and Super Bowl).

From 1947 through 1958, the first selection in the NFL draft was awarded by a random draw known as the "bonus pick." The team that received the bonus pick forfeited its selection in the final round of the draft, and once a team won, it was excluded from future draws. By the 1958 draft, all twelve league teams had received a bonus pick, leading to the system's abolition. Following this, the NFL faced competition from the American Football League (AFL), which held a separate draft prior to the merger agreements in 1966. This rivalry resulted in both leagues often drafting the same players, sparking bidding wars for top prospects. The two leagues adopted a unified "common draft" system as part of the merger. After the AFL-NFL merger was finalized in 1970, the common draft became the modern NFL draft.

Through the 2026 NFL draft, 91 players have been selected first overall, with the first being Jay Berwanger and the most recent being Fernando Mendoza. The Indianapolis Colts and the Los Angeles Rams have each made the most first overall selections in history with seven, while the Baltimore Ravens, the Seattle Seahawks, and the Denver Broncos have never selected a player first overall. USC is the college with the most selections with 6, followed by Notre Dame, Oklahoma, and Georgia with 5. Quarterbacks are most commonly selected position with 41, followed by running backs with 23. Of the first overall draft picks, 43 have been selected to a Pro Bowl and 14 have been inducted into the Pro Football Hall of Fame.

== List of first overall picks ==
Key

K	Kicker	NT	Nose tackle	C	Center
LB	Linebacker	FB	Fullback	DB	Defensive back
P	Punter	HB	Halfback	DE	Defensive end
QB	Quarterback	WR/E	Wide receiver/End	DT	Defensive tackle
G	Guard	T	Offensive tackle	TE	Tight end

*	Selected to a Pro Bowl/All-Star Game
‡	Inducted into the Pro Football Hall of Fame (all were also selected to a Pro Bowl)
§	Denotes an expansion team

First overall draft picks
Year	Name	Position	College	Team	Notes	Ref
1936	Jay Berwanger (Note: Jay Berwanger did not sign with the Philadelphia Eagles. The Eagles traded his rights to the Chicago Bears; he did not sign with them either.)	HB	Chicago	Philadelphia Eagles	Heisman Trophy (1935)	
1937	Sam Francis	FB	Nebraska	Philadelphia Eagles	N/A	
1938	Corbett Davis	FB	Indiana	Cleveland Rams	N/A	
1939	Ki Aldrich*	C	TCU	Chicago Cardinals	NFL All-Star Game (1939, 1942)	
1940	George Cafego	HB	Tennessee	Chicago Cardinals	N/A	
1941	Tom Harmon	HB	Michigan	Chicago Bears	Heisman Trophy (1940)	
1942	Bill Dudley^{‡}	HB	Virginia	Pittsburgh Steelers	NFL All-Star Game (1950, 1951); Pro Football Hall of Fame (1966); NFL MVP (1946)	
1943	Frank Sinkwich	HB	Georgia	Detroit Lions	Heisman Trophy (1942); NFL MVP (1944)	
1944	Angelo Bertelli	QB	Notre Dame	Boston Yanks	Heisman Trophy (1943)	
1945	Charley Trippi^{‡}	HB	Georgia	Chicago Cardinals	Pro Bowl (1952, 1953); Pro Football Hall of Fame (1968); NFL Champion (1947)	
1946	Frank Dancewicz	QB	Notre Dame	Boston Yanks	N/A	
1947	Bob Fenimore	HB	Oklahoma A&M	Chicago Bears	N/A	
1948	Harry Gilmer*	HB, WR	Alabama	Washington Redskins	Pro Bowl (1950, 1952)	
1949	Chuck Bednarik^{‡}	C, LB	Penn	Philadelphia Eagles	Pro Bowl (1950, 1951, 1952, 1953, 1954, 1955, 1956, 1960); Pro Football Hall of Fame (1967); NFL Champion (1949, 1960)	
1950	Leon Hart*	E	Notre Dame	Detroit Lions	Heisman Trophy (1949); Pro Bowl (1951)	
1951	Kyle Rote*	HB	SMU	New York Giants	Pro Bowl (1953, 1954, 1955, 1956)	
1952	Bill Wade*	QB	Vanderbilt	Los Angeles Rams	Pro Bowl (1958, 1963)	
1953	Harry Babcock	E	Georgia	San Francisco 49ers	N/A	
1954	Bobby Garrett	QB	Stanford	Cleveland Browns	N/A	
1955	George Shaw	QB	Oregon	Baltimore Colts	NFL Champion (1958)	
1956	Gary Glick	DB	Colorado A&M	Pittsburgh Steelers	N/A	
1957	Paul Hornung^{‡}	HB	Notre Dame	Green Bay Packers	Heisman Trophy (1956); Pro Bowl (1959, 1960); Pro Football Hall of Fame (1986); NFL Champion (1961, 1962, 1965); Super Bowl champion (I); NFL MVP (1961)	
1958	King Hill	QB	Rice	Chicago Cardinals	N/A	
1959	Randy Duncan	QB	Iowa	Green Bay Packers	N/A	
1960	Billy Cannon (Note: Billy Cannon signed with the AFL team Houston Oilers rather than the Los Angeles Rams.)	HB	LSU	Los Angeles Rams	Heisman Trophy (1959); AFL Champion (1960, 1961, 1967); AFL All Star (1961, 1969)	
1961	Tommy Mason*	HB	Tulane	Minnesota Vikings^{§}	Pro Bowl (1962, 1963, 1964)	
1962	Ernie Davis (Note: Ernie Davis was subsequently traded to the Cleveland Browns after being drafted by the Washington Redskins.)	HB	Syracuse	Washington Redskins	Heisman Trophy (1961)	
1963	Terry Baker	QB	Oregon State	Los Angeles Rams	Heisman Trophy (1962)	
1964	Dave Parks*	WR	Texas Tech	San Francisco 49ers	Pro Bowl (1964, 1965, 1966)	
1965	Tucker Frederickson*	HB	Auburn	New York Giants	Pro Bowl (1965)	
1966	Tommy Nobis*	LB	Texas	Atlanta Falcons^{§}	Pro Bowl (1966, 1967, 1968, 1970, 1972)	
1967 (Note: Because of the NFL–AFL merger agreement, the history of the AFL is officially recognized by the NFL and therefore this list includes the common draft for the years 1967, 1968, and 1969.)	Bubba Smith*	DE	Michigan State	Baltimore Colts (Note: Pick received from New Orleans Saints.)	Pro Bowl (1970, 1971); Super Bowl champion (V)	
1968	Ron Yary^{‡}	T	USC	Minnesota Vikings (Note: Pick received from New York Giants.)	Pro Bowl (1971, 1972, 1973, 1974, 1975, 1976, 1977); Pro Football Hall of Fame (2001)	
1969	O. J. Simpson^{‡}	HB	USC	Buffalo Bills	Heisman Trophy (1968); Pro Bowl (1969, 1972, 1973, 1974, 1975, 1976); Pro Football Hall of Fame (1985); NFL MVP (1973)	
1970	Terry Bradshaw^{‡}	QB	Louisiana Tech	Pittsburgh Steelers	Pro Bowl (1975, 1978, 1979); Pro Football Hall of Fame (1989); Super Bowl champion (IX, X, XIII, XIV); Super Bowl MVP (XIII, XIV); NFL MVP (1978)	
1971	Jim Plunkett	QB	Stanford	New England Patriots	Heisman Trophy (1970); Super Bowl champion (XV, XVIII); Super Bowl MVP (XV)	
1972	Walt Patulski	DE	Notre Dame	Buffalo Bills	N/A	
1973	John Matuszak	DE	Tampa	Houston Oilers	Super Bowl champion (XI, XV)	
1974	Ed Jones*	DE	Tennessee State	Dallas Cowboys (Note: Pick received from Houston Oilers.)	Pro Bowl (1981, 1982, 1983); Super Bowl champion (XII)	
1975	Steve Bartkowski*	QB	California	Atlanta Falcons (Note: Pick received from Baltimore Colts.)	Pro Bowl (1980, 1981)	
1976	Lee Roy Selmon^{‡}	DE	Oklahoma	Tampa Bay Buccaneers^{§}	Pro Bowl (1979, 1980, 1981, 1982, 1983, 1984); Pro Football Hall of Fame (1995)	
1977	Ricky Bell	HB	USC	Tampa Bay Buccaneers	N/A	
1978	Earl Campbell^{‡}	HB	Texas	Houston Oilers (Note: Pick received from Tampa Bay Buccaneers.)	Heisman Trophy (1977); Pro Bowl (1978, 1979, 1980, 1981, 1983); Pro Football Hall of Fame (1991); NFL MVP (1979); Offensive Rookie of the Year (1978)	
1979	Tom Cousineau (Note: Tom Cousineau chose to sign with the CFL team Montreal Alouettes over the Buffalo Bills.)	LB	Ohio State	Buffalo Bills	N/A	
1980	Billy Sims*	HB	Oklahoma	Detroit Lions	Heisman Trophy (1978); Pro Bowl (1980, 1981, 1982); Offensive Rookie of the Year (1980)	
1981	George Rogers*	HB	South Carolina	New Orleans Saints	Heisman Trophy (1980); Pro Bowl (1981, 1982); Super Bowl champion (XXII); Offensive Rookie of the Year (1981)	
1982	Kenneth Sims	DE	Texas	New England Patriots	N/A	
1983	John Elway^{‡} (Note: John Elway was subsequently traded to the Denver Broncos after being drafted by the Baltimore Colts.)	QB	Stanford	Baltimore Colts	Pro Bowl (1986, 1987, 1989, 1991, 1993, 1994, 1996, 1997, 1998); Pro Football Hall of Fame (2004); Super Bowl champion (XXXII, XXXIII); Super Bowl MVP (XXXIII); NFL MVP (1987)	
1984 (Note: College seniors who had already signed with the USFL or CFL were not eligible for the regular draft. Instead the NFL held a three-round special draft on June 5, 1984. The Tampa Bay Buccaneers selected Steve Young first overall in that draft.) (Note: Pick received from Tampa Bay Buccaneers.)	Irving Fryar*	WR	Nebraska	New England Patriots	Pro Bowl (1985, 1993, 1994, 1996, 1997)	
1985	Bruce Smith^{‡}	DE	Virginia Tech	Buffalo Bills	Pro Bowl (1987, 1988, 1989, 1990, 1992, 1993, 1994, 1995, 1996, 1997, 1998); Pro Football Hall of Fame (2009)	
1986	Bo Jackson* (Note: Bo Jackson did not sign with the Tampa Bay Buccaneers and chose to enter the 1987 NFL draft the following year.)	HB	Auburn	Tampa Bay Buccaneers (Note: The Cleveland Browns – via the Buffalo Bills originally – possessed the number one overall pick but because they selected Bernie Kosar in the 1985 supplemental draft, the pick was subsequently given to the Tampa Bay Buccaneers.)	Heisman Trophy (1985); Pro Bowl (1990)	
1987	Vinny Testaverde*	QB	Miami (FL)	Tampa Bay Buccaneers	Heisman Trophy (1986); Pro Bowl (1996, 1998)	
1988	Aundray Bruce	LB	Auburn	Atlanta Falcons	N/A	
1989	Troy Aikman^{‡}	QB	UCLA	Dallas Cowboys	Pro Bowl (1991, 1992, 1993, 1994, 1995, 1996); Pro Football Hall of Fame (2006); Super Bowl champion (XXVII, XXVIII, XXX); Super Bowl MVP (XXVII)	
1990	Jeff George	QB	Illinois	Indianapolis Colts (Note: Pick received from Atlanta Falcons.) (Note: The Dallas Cowboys originally possessed the number one overall pick but because they selected Steve Walsh in the 1989 supplemental draft, the pick was given to the Indianapolis Colts who originally held the second overall pick.)	N/A	
1991	Russell Maryland*	DT	Miami (FL)	Dallas Cowboys (Note: Pick received from New England Patriots.)	Pro Bowl (1993); Super Bowl champion (XXVII, XXVIII, XXX)	
1992	Steve Emtman	DE	Washington	Indianapolis Colts	N/A	
1993	Drew Bledsoe*	QB	Washington State	New England Patriots	Pro Bowl (1994, 1996, 1997, 2002); Super Bowl champion (XXXVI)	
1994	Dan Wilkinson	DT	Ohio State	Cincinnati Bengals	N/A	
1995	Ki-Jana Carter	HB	Penn State	Cincinnati Bengals (Note: Pick received from Carolina Panthers.)	N/A	
1996	Keyshawn Johnson*	WR	USC	New York Jets	Pro Bowl (1998, 1999, 2001); Super Bowl champion (XXXVII)	
1997	Orlando Pace^{‡}	T	Ohio State	St. Louis Rams (Note: Pick received from New York Jets.)	Pro Bowl (1999, 2000, 2001, 2002, 2003, 2004, 2005); Pro Football Hall of Fame (2016); Super Bowl champion (XXXIV)	
1998	Peyton Manning^{‡}	QB	Tennessee	Indianapolis Colts	Pro Bowl (1999, 2000, 2002, 2003, 2004, 2005, 2006, 2007, 2008, 2009, 2010, 2012, 2013, 2014); Pro Football Hall of Fame (2021); Super Bowl champion (XLI, 50); Super Bowl MVP (XLI); NFL MVP (2003, 2004, 2008, 2009, 2013)	
1999	Tim Couch	QB	Kentucky	Cleveland Browns^{§}	N/A	
2000	Courtney Brown	DE	Penn State	Cleveland Browns	N/A	
2001	Michael Vick*	QB	Virginia Tech	Atlanta Falcons (Note: Pick received from San Diego Chargers.)	Pro Bowl (2002, 2004, 2005, 2010)	
2002	David Carr	QB	Fresno State	Houston Texans^{§}	Super Bowl champion (XLVI)	
2003	Carson Palmer*	QB	USC	Cincinnati Bengals	Heisman Trophy (2002); Pro Bowl (2005, 2006, 2015)	
2004	Eli Manning* (Note: Eli Manning's rights were subsequently traded to the New York Giants after being drafted by the San Diego Chargers.)	QB	Ole Miss	San Diego Chargers	Pro Bowl (2008, 2011, 2012, 2015); Super Bowl champion (XLII, XLVI); Super Bowl MVP (XLII, XLVI)	
2005	Alex Smith*	QB	Utah	San Francisco 49ers	Pro Bowl (2013, 2016, 2017)	
2006	Mario Williams*	DE	North Carolina State	Houston Texans	Pro Bowl (2008, 2009, 2013, 2014)	
2007	JaMarcus Russell	QB	LSU	Oakland Raiders	N/A	
2008	Jake Long*	T	Michigan	Miami Dolphins	Pro Bowl (2008, 2009, 2010, 2011)	
2009	Matthew Stafford*	QB	Georgia	Detroit Lions	Pro Bowl (2014, 2023, 2025); Super Bowl champion (LVI); NFL MVP (2025)	
2010	Sam Bradford	QB	Oklahoma	St. Louis Rams	Heisman Trophy (2008); Offensive Rookie of the Year (2010)	
2011	Cam Newton*	QB	Auburn	Carolina Panthers	Heisman Trophy (2010); Pro Bowl (2011, 2013, 2015); Offensive Rookie of the Year (2011); NFL MVP (2015)	
2012	Andrew Luck*	QB	Stanford	Indianapolis Colts	Pro Bowl (2012, 2013, 2014, 2018)	
2013	Eric Fisher*	T	Central Michigan	Kansas City Chiefs	Pro Bowl (2018, 2020); Super Bowl champion (LIV)	
2014	Jadeveon Clowney*	DE	South Carolina	Houston Texans	Pro Bowl (2016, 2017, 2018)	
2015	Jameis Winston*	QB	Florida State	Tampa Bay Buccaneers	Heisman Trophy (2013); Pro Bowl (2015)	
2016	Jared Goff*	QB	California	Los Angeles Rams (Note: Pick received from Tennessee Titans.)	Pro Bowl (2017, 2018, 2022, 2024, 2025)	
2017	Myles Garrett*	DE	Texas A&M	Cleveland Browns	Pro Bowl (2018, 2020, 2021, 2022, 2023, 2024, 2025)DPOY (2025)	
2018	Baker Mayfield*	QB	Oklahoma	Cleveland Browns	Heisman Trophy (2017); Pro Bowl (2023, 2024)	
2019	Kyler Murray*	QB	Oklahoma	Arizona Cardinals	Heisman Trophy (2018); Offensive Rookie of the Year (2019); Pro Bowl (2020, 2021)	
2020	Joe Burrow*	QB	LSU	Cincinnati Bengals	Heisman Trophy (2019); Pro Bowl (2022, 2024, 2025)	
2021	Trevor Lawrence*	QB	Clemson	Jacksonville Jaguars	Pro Bowl (2022)	
2022	Travon Walker	DE	Georgia	Jacksonville Jaguars	N/A	
2023	Bryce Young	QB	Alabama	Carolina Panthers (Note: Pick received from the Chicago Bears.)	Heisman Trophy (2021)	
2024	Caleb Williams	QB	USC	Chicago Bears (Note: Pick received from the Carolina Panthers.)	Heisman Trophy (2022)	
2025	Cam Ward	QB	Miami (FL)	Tennessee Titans	N/A	
2026	Fernando Mendoza	QB	Indiana	Las Vegas Raiders	Heisman Trophy (2025)	

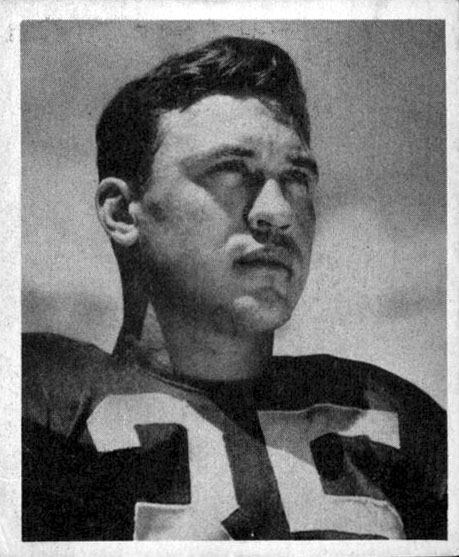
1942 first overall pick Bill Dudley was the first player to score six different types of touchdowns

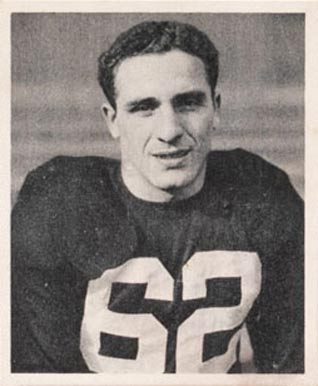
1945 first overall pick Charley Trippi retired as the leader in NFL offensive yards

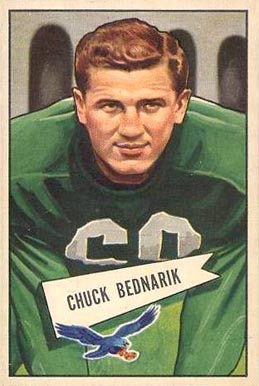
1949 first overall pick Chuck Bednarik was one of the last NFL players to hold an offensive and defensive position

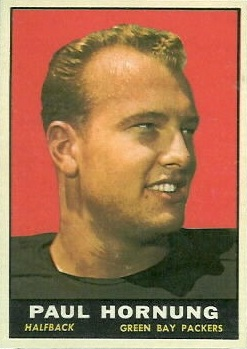
1957 first overall pick Paul Hornung held the single season scoring record for 46 years

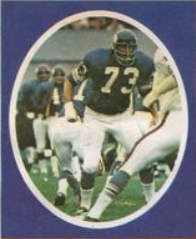
1968 first overall pick Ron Yary was a central contributor of the Minnesota Vikings teams that appeared in four Super Bowls

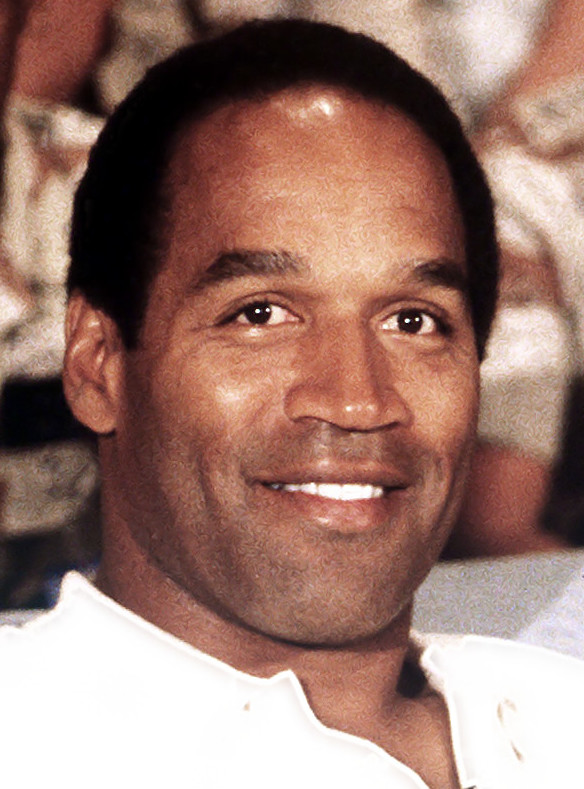
1969 first overall pick O. J. Simpson is the only player to rush for 2,000 yards in a 14-game season

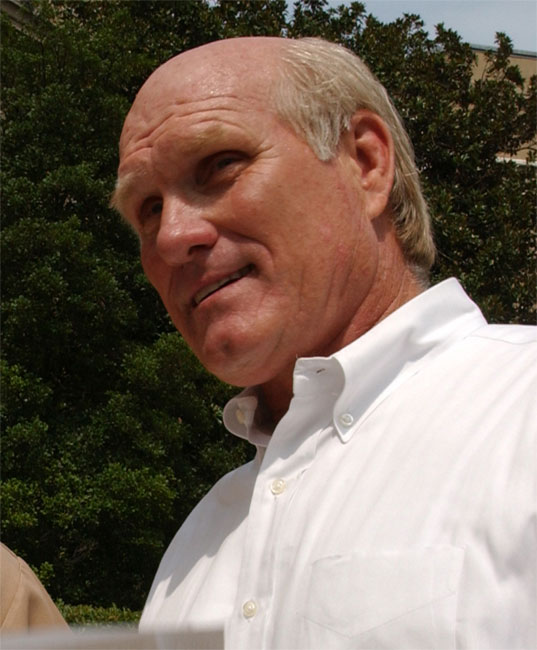
1970 first overall pick Terry Bradshaw was the first quarterback to win four Super Bowls

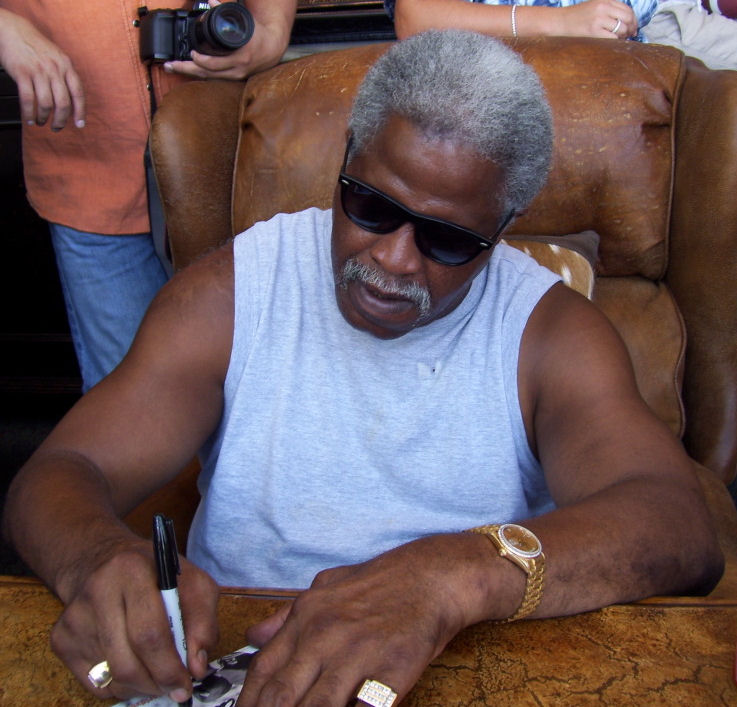
1978 first overall pick Earl Campbell set the record for NFL Offensive Player of the Year awards

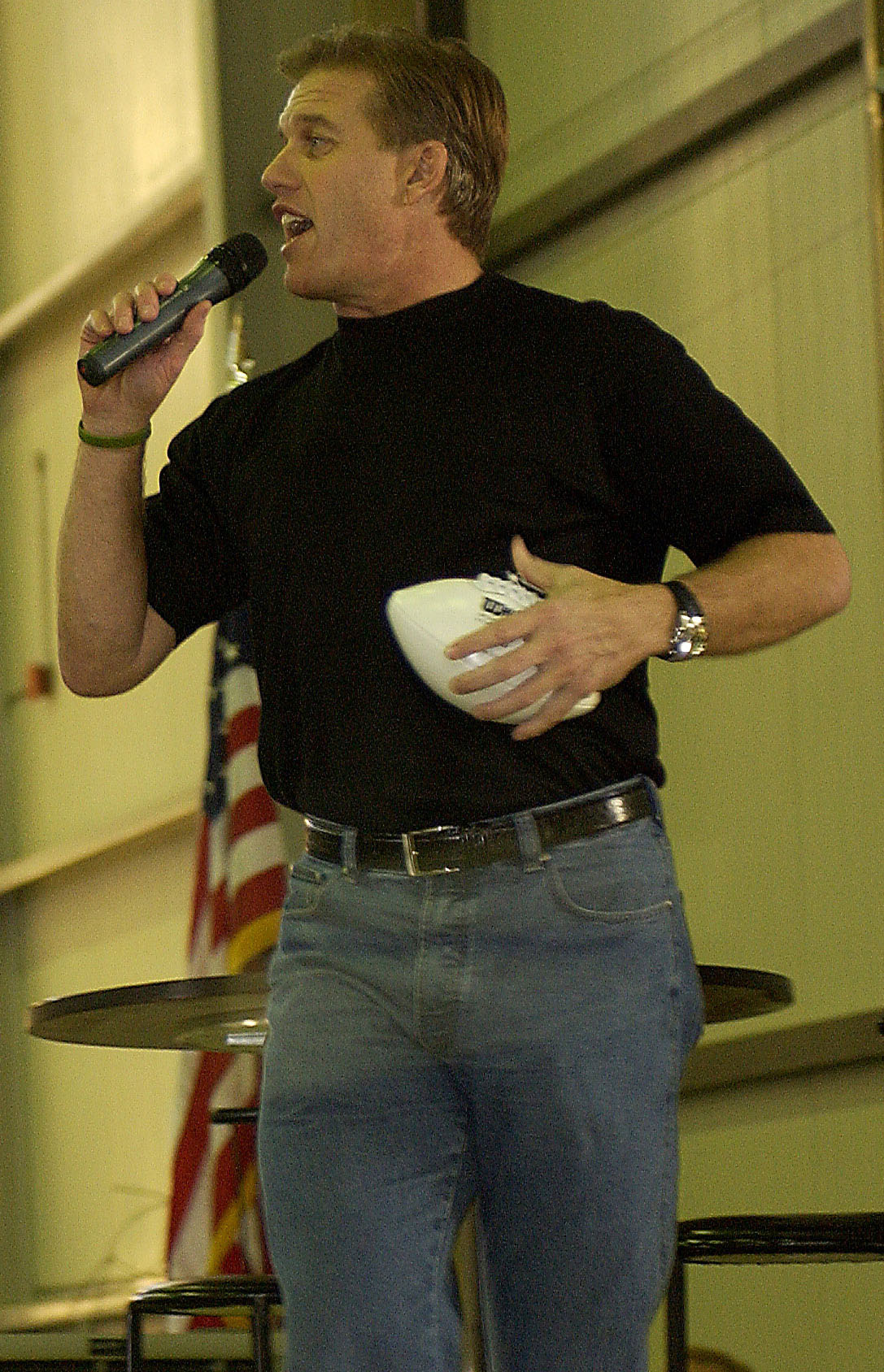
1983 first overall pick John Elway was the first quarterback to start in five Super Bowls

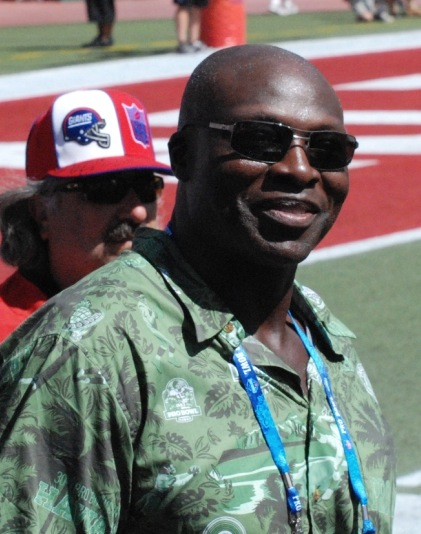
1985 first overall pick Bruce Smith is the NFL leader in quarterback sacks

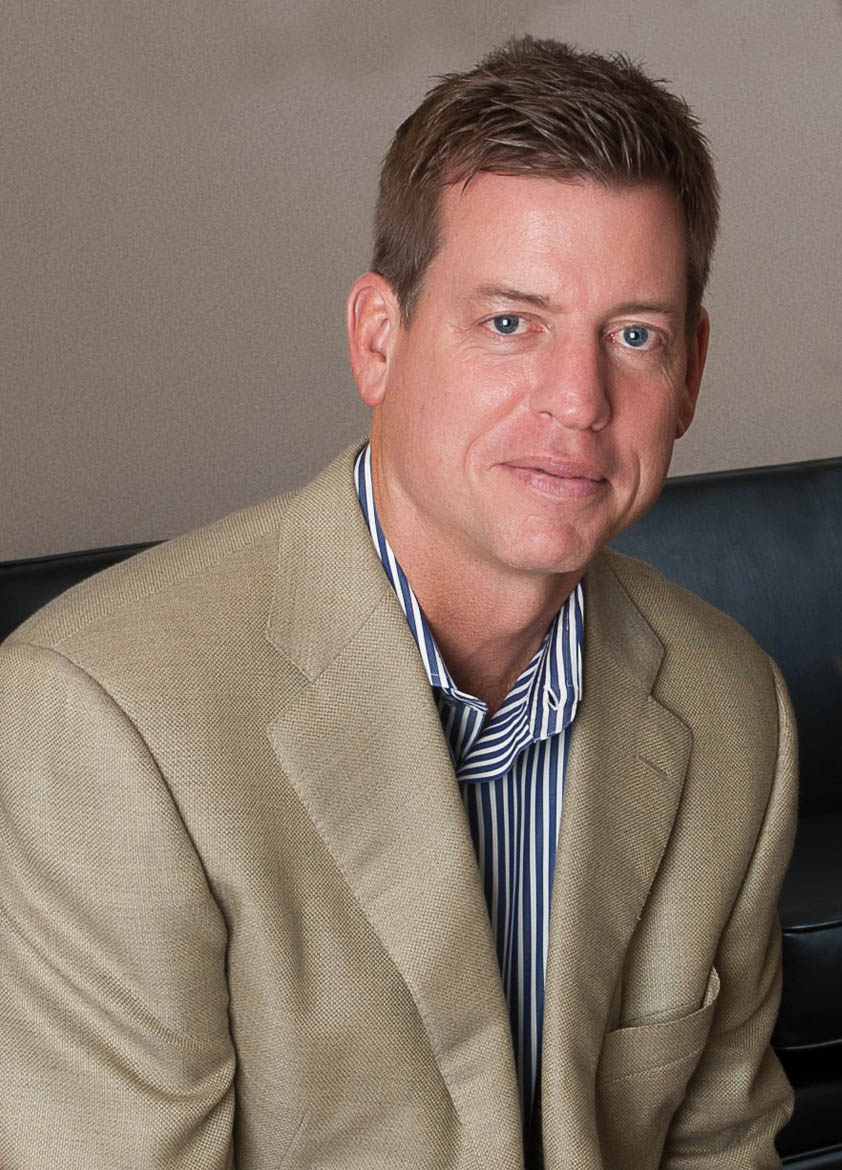
1989 first overall pick Troy Aikman helped establish the Dallas Cowboys as a dynasty during the 1990s

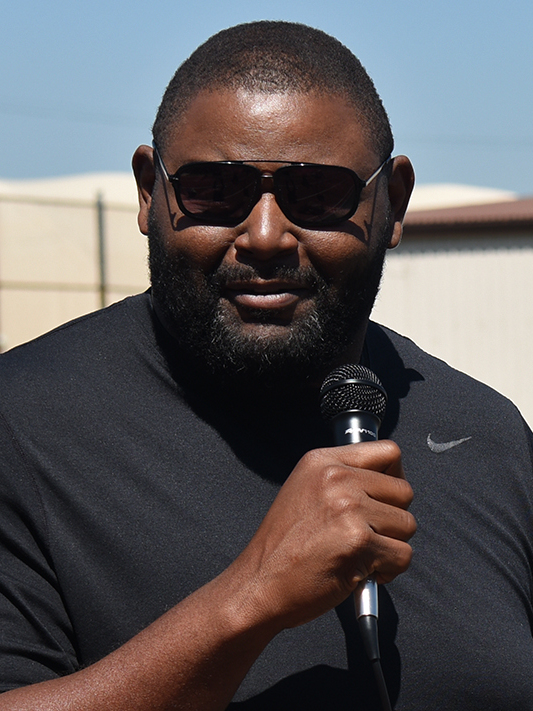
1997 first overall pick Orlando Pace protected three consecutive NFL MVPs as their offensive tackle

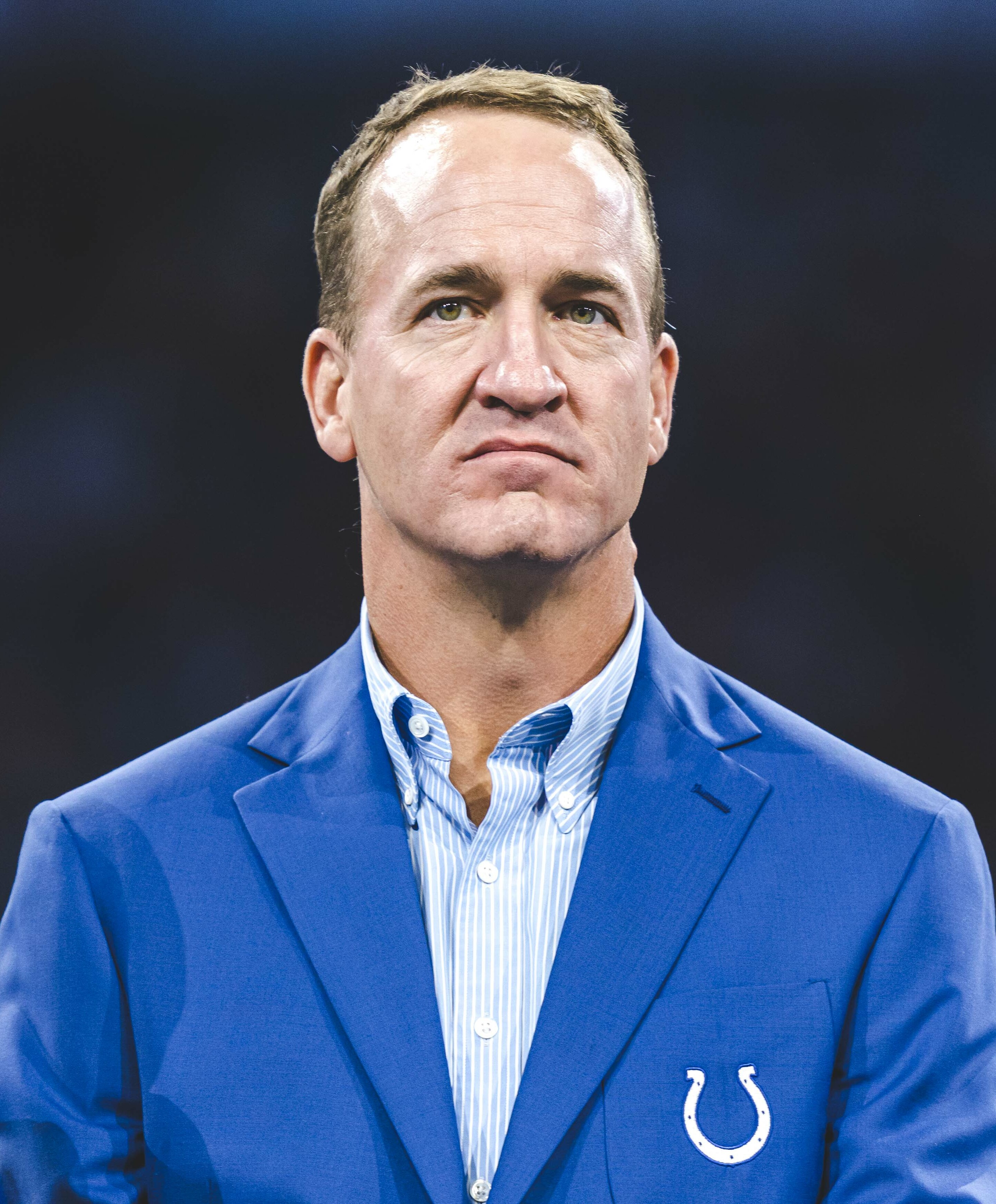
1998 first overall pick Peyton Manning holds the record for NFL MVP awards

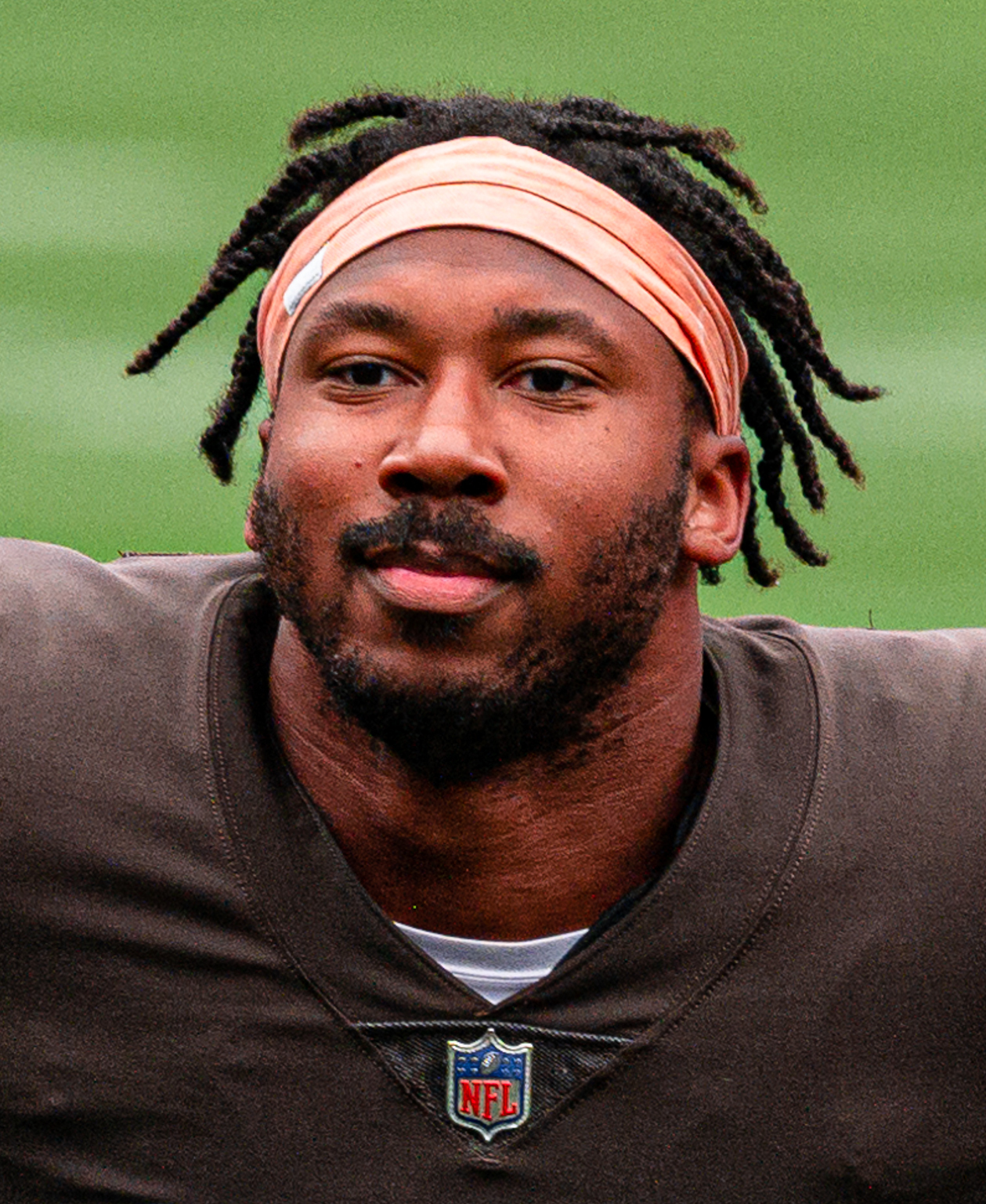
2017 first overall pick Myles Garrett holds the single season sack record

== First overall picks by NFL team ==
The Indianapolis Colts and Los Angeles Rams have each held the first overall pick a total of seven times, the most of any NFL team. This includes the Colts' time in Baltimore and the Rams' time in Cleveland and St. Louis. The Boston Yanks are the only defunct franchise to have held a first overall pick. The Baltimore Ravens, Denver Broncos and Seattle Seahawks are the only teams that have never had the first overall pick.

Team	Picks	Year(s)	Notes	Ref.
Indianapolis Colts	7	1955, 1967, 1983, 1990, 1992, 1998, 2012	3 as the Baltimore Colts; 4 as the Indianapolis Colts	
Los Angeles Rams	7	1938, 1952, 1960, 1963, 1997, 2010, 2016	1 as the Cleveland Rams; 2 as the St. Louis Rams; 4 as the Los Angeles Rams	
Tampa Bay Buccaneers	5	1976, 1977, 1986, 1987, 2015	Also had first selection in the 1984 NFL supplemental draft of USFL and CFL players.	
Cleveland Browns	5	1954, 1999, 2000, 2017, 2018		
Arizona Cardinals	5	1939, 1940, 1945, 1958, 2019	4 as the Chicago Cardinals	
Detroit Lions	4	1943, 1950, 1980, 2009		
Atlanta Falcons	4	1966, 1975, 1988, 2001		
Buffalo Bills	4	1969, 1972, 1979, 1985	Also had first selection in the 1961 AFL draft	
Cincinnati Bengals	4	1994, 1995, 2003, 2020		
New England Patriots	4	1971, 1982, 1984, 1993	Also had first selection in the 1964 AFL draft (as the Boston Patriots)	
Philadelphia Eagles	3	1936, 1937, 1949		
Chicago Bears	3	1941, 1947, 2024		
Pittsburgh Steelers	3	1942, 1956, 1970		
San Francisco 49ers	3	1953, 1964, 2005		
Dallas Cowboys	3	1974, 1989, 1991		
Houston Texans	3	2002, 2006, 2014		
Tennessee Titans	3	1973, 1978, 2025	2 as the Houston Oilers	
Boston Yanks	2	1944, 1946		
Washington Commanders	2	1948, 1962	2 as the Washington Redskins	
New York Giants	2	1951, 1965		
Green Bay Packers	2	1957, 1959		
Minnesota Vikings	2	1961*, 1968		
Carolina Panthers	2	2011, 2023		
Jacksonville Jaguars	2	2021, 2022		
Las Vegas Raiders	2	2007, 2026	1 as the Oakland Raiders; 1 as the Las Vegas Raiders; Also had first selection in the 1962 AFL draft	
New Orleans Saints	1	1981		
New York Jets	1	1996	Also had first selection in the 1965 AFL draft	
Los Angeles Chargers	1	2004	1 as the San Diego Chargers	
Miami Dolphins	1	2008	Also had first selection in the 1966 AFL draft	
Kansas City Chiefs	1	2013	Also had first selection in the 1963 AFL draft	

== First overall picks by school ==
USC has the most first overall picks with 6. Notre Dame, Oklahoma, and Georgia are tied for second-most first overall picks with 5 each. Auburn, and Stanford are both tied for third-most first overall picks with 4 each. Only two schools have had first overall picks in consecutive years: USC, with Ron Yary (1968) and O. J. Simpson (1969), and Oklahoma, with Baker Mayfield (2018) and Kyler Murray (2019).

School	Total	Year(s)
USC	6	1968, 1969, 1977, 1996, 2003, 2024
Notre Dame	5	1944, 1946, 1950, 1957, 1972
Oklahoma	5	1976, 1980, 2010, 2018, 2019
Georgia	5	1943, 1945, 1953, 2009, 2022
Auburn	4	1965, 1986, 1988, 2011
Stanford	4	1954, 1971, 1983, 2012
LSU	3	1960, 2007, 2020
Texas	3	1966, 1978, 1982
Ohio State	3	1979, 1994, 1997
Miami (FL)	3	1987, 1991, 2025
Alabama	2	1948, 2023
Nebraska	2	1937, 1984
Tennessee	2	1940, 1998
Penn State	2	1995, 2000
Virginia Tech	2	1985, 2001
Michigan	2	1941, 2008
South Carolina	2	1981, 2014
California	2	1975, 2016
Indiana	2	1938, 2026
Chicago	1	1936
TCU	1	1939
Virginia	1	1942
Oklahoma State	1	1947
Penn	1	1949
SMU	1	1951
Vanderbilt	1	1952
Oregon	1	1955
Colorado State	1	1956
Rice	1	1958
Iowa	1	1959
Tulane	1	1961
Syracuse	1	1962
Oregon State	1	1963
Texas Tech	1	1964
Michigan State	1	1967
Louisiana Tech	1	1970
Tampa	1	1973
Tennessee State	1	1974
UCLA	1	1989
Illinois	1	1990
Washington	1	1992
Washington State	1	1993
Kentucky	1	1999
Fresno State	1	2002
Ole Miss	1	2004
Utah	1	2005
North Carolina State	1	2006
Central Michigan	1	2013
Florida State	1	2015
Texas A&M	1	2017
Clemson	1	2021

== First overall picks by position ==
First overall selections by position played
Position	Number of selections	Last year selected
Quarterbacks	41	2026
Running backs	23	1995
Defensive linemen	15	2022
Offensive linemen	7	2013
Wide receivers	6	1996
Linebackers	4	1988
Defensive backs	1	1956

== See also ==
- List of second overall NFL draft picks
- Mr. Irrelevant – title given to the final pick in the draft
- List of first overall CFL draft picks
