= 1938 Rice Owls football team =

American college football season

1938 Rice Owls football
- Conference: Southwest Conference
- Record: 4–6 (3–3 SWC)
- Head coach: Jimmy Kitts (5th season)
- Home stadium: Rice Field

1938 Southwest Conference football standings
	Conf.					Overall
Team	W		L		T	W		L		T
No. 1 TCU $	6	–	0	–	0	11	–	0	–	0
SMU	4	–	2	–	0	6	–	4	–	0
Baylor	3	–	2	–	1	7	–	2	–	1
Rice	3	–	3	–	0	4	–	6	–	0
Texas A&M	2	–	3	–	1	4	–	4	–	1
Arkansas	1	–	5	–	0	2	–	7	–	1
Texas	1	–	5	–	0	1	–	8	–	0
$ – Conference champion; Rankings from AP Poll

The 1938 Rice Owls football team was an American football team that represented Rice Institute as a member of the Southwest Conference (SWC) during the 1938 college football season. In its fifth season under head coach Jimmy Kitts, the team compiled a 4–6 record (3–3 against SWC opponents) and was outscored by a total of 133 to 91.

== Schedule ==
Date	Opponent	Site	Result	Attendance	Source
October 1	Oklahoma*	Rice Field; Houston, TX	L 6–7	18,000	
October 8	at LSU*	Tiger Stadium; Baton Rouge, LA	L 0–3	40,000	
October 15	at Tulane*	Tulane Stadium; New Orleans, LA	L 17–26	24,000	
October 22	Texas	Rice Field; Houston, TX (rivalry)	W 13–6	20,000	
October 29	Auburn*	Rice Field; Houston, TX	W 14–0		
November 5	at Arkansas	Bailey Stadium; Fayetteville, AR	W 3–0	10,000	
November 12	at Texas A&M	Kyle Field; College Station, TX	L 0–27	17,000	
November 19	No. 2 TCU	Rice Field; Houston, TX	L 7–29		
November 26	Baylor	Rice Field; Houston, TX	L 6–21		
December 3	SMU	Rice Field; Houston, TX (rivalry)	W 25–14		
*Non-conference game; Rankings from AP Poll released prior to the game
