= 1938 Saint Louis Billikens football team =

American college football season

1938 Saint Louis Billikens football
- Conference: Missouri Valley Conference
- Record: 3–5–2 (1–1–1 MVC)
- Head coach: Cecil Muellerleile (5th season)
- Home stadium: Walsh Stadium

1938 Missouri Valley Conference football standings
	Conf.					Overall
Team	W		L		T	W		L		T
Washburn *	2	–	0	–	0	6	–	3	–	0
Creighton *	1	–	0	–	1	6	–	1	–	1
Tulsa $	3	–	1	–	0	4	–	5	–	1
Washington University	2	–	1	–	1	6	–	3	–	1
Drake	2	–	1	–	1	5	–	4	–	1
Saint Louis	1	–	1	–	1	3	–	5	–	2
Grinnell	0	–	3	–	0	3	–	5	–	0
Oklahoma A&M	0	–	4	–	0	2	–	8	–	0
$ – Conference champion; * ineligible for championship because of insufficient games

The 1938 Saint Louis Billikens football team represented Saint Louis University during the 1938 college football season, their 39th season in existence. They finished the season 3–5–2 and 1–1–1 in the Missouri Valley Conference.

Against fellow MVC team, they lost to Tulsa, beat Grinnell, and tied Washington University. They recorded losses against Ole Miss of the Southeastern Conference (SEC) and Missouri of the Big Six Conference.

== Schedule ==
Date	Opponent	Site	Result	Attendance	Source
September 23	Bradley Tech*	Walsh Stadium; St. Louis, MO	L 0–6	6,224	
September 30	Missouri Mines*	Walsh Stadium; St. Louis, MO	W 12–0		
October 8	at Wichita*	Wichita, KS	T 0–0		
October 14	Tulsa	Walsh Stadium; St. Louis, MO	L 0–28	9,428	
October 21	Grinnell	Walsh Stadium; St. Louis, MO	W 27–7		
October 29	at Catholic University*	Brookland Stadium; Washington, DC	W 13–0		
November 5	Ole Miss*	Walsh Stadium; St. Louis, MO	L 12–14	8,429	
November 12	at DePaul*	Loyola Stadium; Chicago, IL	L 9–20		
November 19	Missouri*	Walsh Stadium; St. Louis, MO	L 0–26		
November 24	Washington University	Walsh Stadium; St. Louis, MO	T 0–0		
*Non-conference game
