= 1938 Baylor Bears football team =

American college football season

1938 Baylor Bears football
- Conference: Southwest Conference
- Record: 7–2–1 (3–2–1 SWC)
- Head coach: Morley Jennings (13th season)
- Captains: Sam Boyd; Billy J. Patterson
- Home stadium: Waco Stadium

1938 Southwest Conference football standings
| | Conf. | | | | | Overall |
| Team | W | | L | | T | W | | L | | T |
|---|---|---|---|---|---|---|---|---|---|---|
| No. 1 TCU $ | 6 | – | 0 | – | 0 | 11 | – | 0 | – | 0 |
| SMU | 4 | – | 2 | – | 0 | 6 | – | 4 | – | 0 |
| Baylor | 3 | – | 2 | – | 1 | 7 | – | 2 | – | 1 |
| Rice | 3 | – | 3 | – | 0 | 4 | – | 6 | – | 0 |
| Texas A&M | 2 | – | 3 | – | 1 | 4 | – | 4 | – | 1 |
| Arkansas | 1 | – | 5 | – | 0 | 2 | – | 7 | – | 1 |
| Texas | 1 | – | 5 | – | 0 | 1 | – | 8 | – | 0 |
$ – Conference champion; Rankings from AP Poll

The 1938 Baylor Bears football team represented Baylor University in the Southwest Conference (SWC) during the 1938 college football season. In their 13th season under head coach Morley Jennings, the Bears compiled a 7–2–1 record (3–2–1 against conference opponents), finished in third place in the conference, and outscored opponents by a combined total of 165 to 89. They played their home games at Waco Stadium in Waco, Texas. Sam Boyd and Billy J. Patterson were the team captains.

== Schedule ==
| Date | Opponent | Rank | Site | Result | Attendance | Source |
|---|---|---|---|---|---|---|
| September 24 | Southwestern (TX)* | | Waco Stadium; Waco, TX | W 33–0 | 4,000 | |
| September 30 | vs. Oklahoma A&M* | | Coyote Stadium; Wichita Falls, TX | W 20–6 | | |
| October 8 | at Arkansas | | Bailey Stadium; Fayetteville, AR | W 9–6 | | |
| October 15 | Centenary* | | Waco Stadium; Waco, TX | W 14–0 | | |
| October 22 | Texas A&M^{†} | No. 17 | Waco Stadium; Waco, TX (rivalry) | T 6–6 | 15,000 | |
| October 29 | at No. 4 TCU | | T.C.U. Stadium; Fort Worth, TX (rivalry) | L 7–39 | 25,000 | |
| November 5 | at Texas | | War Memorial Stadium; Austin, TX (rivalry) | W 14–3 | 14,000 | |
| November 11 | at Loyola (CA)* | | Los Angeles Memorial Coliseum; Los Angeles, CA | W 35–2 | 45,000 | |
| November 19 | SMU | | Waco Stadium; Waco, TX | L 6–21 | | |
| November 26 | at Rice | | Rice Field; Houston, TX | W 21–6 | | |
*Non-conference game; ^{†}Homecoming; Rankings from AP Poll released prior to the game
