= 1938 Creighton Bluejays football team =

American college football season

1938 Creighton Bluejays football
- Conference: Missouri Valley Conference
- Record: 6–1–1 (1–0–1 MVC)
- Head coach: Marchmont Schwartz (4th season)
- Home stadium: Creighton Stadium

1938 Missouri Valley Conference football standings
	Conf.					Overall
Team	W		L		T	W		L		T
Washburn *	2	–	0	–	0	6	–	3	–	0
Creighton *	1	–	0	–	1	6	–	1	–	1
Tulsa $	3	–	1	–	0	4	–	5	–	1
Washington University	2	–	1	–	1	6	–	3	–	1
Drake	2	–	1	–	1	5	–	4	–	1
Saint Louis	1	–	1	–	1	3	–	5	–	2
Grinnell	0	–	3	–	0	3	–	5	–	0
Oklahoma A&M	0	–	4	–	0	2	–	8	–	0
$ – Conference champion; * ineligible for championship because of insufficient games

The 1938 Creighton Bluejays football team was an American football team that represented Creighton University as a member of the Missouri Valley Conference (MVC) during the 1938 college football season. In its fourth season under head coach Marchmont Schwartz, the team compiled a 6–1–1 record (1–0–1 against MVC opponents) and outscored opponents by a total of 179 to 40. The team played its home games at Creighton Stadium in Omaha, Nebraska.

== Schedule ==
Date	Opponent	Site	Result	Attendance	Source
October 1	South Dakota*	Creighton Stadium; Omaha, NE	W 26–0	8,000	
October 8	Oklahoma A&M	Creighton Stadium; Omaha, NE	W 16–7		
October 15	at Drake	Drake Stadium; Des Moines, IA	T 7–7		
October 22	West Virginia*	Creighton Stadium; Omaha, NE	L 13–20	11,000	
October 29	at Wichita*	Wichita, KS	W 6–0	5,500	
November 5	St. Benedict's*	Creighton Stadium; Omaha, NE	W 39–6		
November 13	at Loyola (LA)*	Loyola University Stadium; New Orleans, LA	W 34–0		
November 19	North Dakota Agricultural*	Creighton Stadium; Omaha, NE	W 38–0		
*Non-conference game
