= 1938 Texas Longhorns football team =

American college football season

1938 Texas Longhorns football
- Conference: Southwest Conference
- Record: 1–8 (1–5 SWC)
- Head coach: Dana X. Bible (2nd season)
- Captain: Game captains
- Home stadium: War Memorial Stadium

1938 Southwest Conference football standings
| | Conf. | | | | | Overall |
| Team | W | | L | | T | W | | L | | T |
|---|---|---|---|---|---|---|---|---|---|---|
| No. 1 TCU $ | 6 | – | 0 | – | 0 | 11 | – | 0 | – | 0 |
| SMU | 4 | – | 2 | – | 0 | 6 | – | 4 | – | 0 |
| Baylor | 3 | – | 2 | – | 1 | 7 | – | 2 | – | 1 |
| Rice | 3 | – | 3 | – | 0 | 4 | – | 6 | – | 0 |
| Texas A&M | 2 | – | 3 | – | 1 | 4 | – | 4 | – | 1 |
| Arkansas | 1 | – | 5 | – | 0 | 2 | – | 7 | – | 1 |
| Texas | 1 | – | 5 | – | 0 | 1 | – | 8 | – | 0 |
$ – Conference champion; Rankings from AP Poll

The 1938 Texas Longhorns football team was an American football team that represented the University of Texas (now known as the University of Texas at Austin) as a member of the Southwest Conference (SWC) during the 1938 college football season. In their second year under head coach Dana X. Bible, the Longhorns compiled an overall record of 1–8, with a mark of 1–5 in conference play, and finished tied for sixth in the SWC.

== Schedule ==
| Date | Opponent | Site | Result | Attendance | Source |
|---|---|---|---|---|---|
| September 24 | at Kansas* | Memorial Stadium; Lawrence, KS | L 18–19 | 10,000 | |
| October 1 | LSU* | War Memorial Stadium; Austin, TX | L 0–20 | 17,000 | |
| October 8 | vs. Oklahoma* | Cotton Bowl; Dallas, TX (rivalry) | L 0–13 | 20,000 | |
| October 15 | at Arkansas | Quigley Stadium; Little Rock, AR (rivalry) | L 6–42 | | |
| October 22 | at Rice | Rice Field; Houston, TX (rivalry) | L 6–13 | 20,000 | |
| October 29 | at SMU | Ownby Stadium; University Park, TX | L 6–7 | 12,000 | |
| November 5 | Baylor | War Memorial Stadium; Austin, TX (rivalry) | L 3–14 | 14,000 | |
| November 12 | at No. 1 TCU | Amon G. Carter Stadium; Fort Worth, TX (rivalry) | L 6–28 | 12,000 | |
| November 24 | Texas A&M | War Memorial Stadium; Austin, TX (rivalry) | W 7–6 | 35,000 | |
*Non-conference game; Rankings from AP Poll released prior to the game
