= 1938 Oklahoma A&M Cowboys football team =

American college football season

1938 Oklahoma A&M Cowboys football
- Conference: Missouri Valley Conference
- Record: 2–8 (0–4 MVC)
- Head coach: Ted Cox (3rd season)
- Home stadium: Lewis Field

1938 Missouri Valley Conference football standings
| | Conf. | | | | | Overall |
| Team | W | | L | | T | W | | L | | T |
|---|---|---|---|---|---|---|---|---|---|---|
| Washburn * | 2 | – | 0 | – | 0 | 6 | – | 3 | – | 0 |
| Creighton * | 1 | – | 0 | – | 1 | 6 | – | 1 | – | 1 |
| Tulsa $ | 3 | – | 1 | – | 0 | 4 | – | 5 | – | 1 |
| Washington University | 2 | – | 1 | – | 1 | 6 | – | 3 | – | 1 |
| Drake | 2 | – | 1 | – | 1 | 5 | – | 4 | – | 1 |
| Saint Louis | 1 | – | 1 | – | 1 | 3 | – | 5 | – | 2 |
| Grinnell | 0 | – | 3 | – | 0 | 3 | – | 5 | – | 0 |
| Oklahoma A&M | 0 | – | 4 | – | 0 | 2 | – | 8 | – | 0 |
$ – Conference champion; * ineligible for championship because of insufficient games

The 1938 Oklahoma A&M Cowboys football team represented Oklahoma A&M College in the 1938 college football season. This was the 38th year of football at A&M and the third under Ted Cox. The Cowboys played their home games at Lewis Field in Stillwater, Oklahoma. They finished the season 2–8, 0–4 in the Missouri Valley Conference.

== Schedule ==
| Date | Opponent | Site | Result | Attendance | Source |
|---|---|---|---|---|---|
| September 17 | Central State Teachers* | Lewis Field; Stillwater, OK | W 23–12 | | |
| September 24 | at Arkansas* | University Stadium; Fayetteville AR | L 7–27 | | |
| September 30 | vs. Baylor* | Coyote Stadium; Wichita Falls, TX | L 6–20 | | |
| October 8 | at Creighton | Creighton Stadium; Omaha, NE | L 7–16 | | |
| October 22 | at Tulsa | Skelly Field; Tulsa, OK (rivalry) | L 7–20 | 14,000 | |
| October 28 | Washburn | Lewis Field; Stillwater, OK | L 0–14 | | |
| November 4 | at Washington University | Francis Field; St. Louis, MO | L 0–24 | 3,301 | |
| November 11 | at Oklahoma City* | Taft Stadium; Oklahoma City, OK | W 19–12 | | |
| November 19 | Wichita* | Lewis Field; Stillwater, OK | L 6–14 | | |
| November 26 | No. 6 Oklahoma*^{†} | Lewis Field; Stillwater, OK (Bedlam Series) | L 0–19 | | |
*Non-conference game; ^{†}Homecoming; Rankings from AP Poll released prior to the game

== NFL draft ==
The following Cowboy was selected into the 1939 NFL draft following the season.

| Player | Position | Round | Pick | Franchise |
|---|---|---|---|---|
| George Vogeler | Center | 6 | 186 | Chicago Bears |
