= 1938 Nebraska Cornhuskers football team =

American college football season

1938 Nebraska Cornhuskers football
- Conference: Big Six Conference
- Record: 3–5–1 (2–3 Big 6)
- Head coach: Biff Jones (2nd season)
- Offensive scheme: Single-wing
- Home stadium: Memorial Stadium

1938 Big Six Conference football standings
	Conf.					Overall
Team	W		L		T	W		L		T
No. 4 Oklahoma $	5	–	0	–	0	10	–	1	–	0
Iowa State	3	–	1	–	1	7	–	1	–	1
Missouri	2	–	3	–	0	6	–	3	–	0
Nebraska	2	–	3	–	0	3	–	5	–	1
Kansas State	1	–	3	–	1	4	–	4	–	1
Kansas	1	–	4	–	0	3	–	6	–	0
$ – Conference champion; Rankings from AP Poll

The 1938 Nebraska Cornhuskers football team was an American football team that represented the University of Nebraska in the Big Six Conference during the 1938 college football season. In its second season under head coach Biff Jones, the team compiled a 3–5–1 record (2–3 against conference opponents), tied for third place in the Big Six, and was outscored opponents by a total of 84 to 68. The team played its home games at Memorial Stadium in Lincoln, Nebraska.

== Before the season ==
Coach Jones returned for his second season since taking over for the popular and successful Dana X. Bible, and the transition seemed to have been completed without difficulty as he had brought another league title to Lincoln in his first season. However, a large number of starters had graduated or otherwise left after 1937, and the depth chart established for 1938 was made up mainly of underclassmen, especially sophomores, making for a young and inexperienced team.

== Schedule ==
Date	Time	Opponent	Site	Result	Attendance	Source
October 1	2:00 p.m.	at Minnesota*	Memorial Stadium; Minneapolis, MN (rivalry)	L 7–16	46,000	
October 8	2:00 p.m.	Iowa State	Memorial Stadium; Lincoln, NE (rivalry)	L 7–8	28,468	
October 15	2:00 p.m.	Indiana*	Memorial Stadium; Lincoln, NE	T 0–0		
October 22	2:30 p.m.	at No. 14 Oklahoma	Memorial Stadium; Norman, OK (rivalry)	L 0–14		
October 29	2:00 p.m.	Missouri^{†}	Memorial Stadium; Lincoln, NE (rivalry)	L 20–26		
November 5	2:00 p.m.	at Kansas	Memorial Stadium; Lawrence, KS (rivalry)	W 16–7		
November 12	2:00 p.m.	No. 3 Pittsburgh*	Memorial Stadium; Lincoln, NE	L 0–19	35,000	
November 19	2:00 p.m.	at Iowa*	Iowa Stadium; Iowa City, IA (rivalry)	W 14–0		
November 24	2:00 p.m.	Kansas State	Memorial Stadium; Lincoln, NE (rivalry)	W 14–7		
*Non-conference game; ^{†}Homecoming; Rankings from AP Poll released prior to the game; All times are in Central time

== Roster ==
Alfson, Warren #22 G Andreson, William #32 QB; Ashburn, Jack #55 E Behm, Forrest #33 T Brock, Charles #47 C Burruss, Robert #49 C Callihan, William #34 FB; Cather, Bud #10 HB; Dobson, Adna #53 G Dodd, Edward #24 HB; Elam, Frank E Farmer, LeRoy #11 G Goetowski, Paul #48 T Grimm, Lloyd #44 E Hann, Leo #23 E Herrmann, William #29 G Hitchcock, Richard #39 T Hopp, Harry #37 FB; Iverson, William #30 G Kahler, Robert #35 E Kahler, Royal #42 T Klum, Arlo #51 G Knickrehm, Hubert #40 T Knight, George #21 QB	Lomax, Everett #12 G Luther, Walter #27 HB; Meier, Fred #20 C Mills, Robert #46 T Muskin, Leonard #43 G Neprud, Vernon #52 T Nuernberger, Eldon #36 FB; Petsch, Roy #13 QB; Pfeiff, William #50 G Phelps, Thurston #17 QB; Plock, Marvin #15 HB; Porter, George #18 HB; Preston, Fred #56 E Prochaska, Ray #31 E Rohrig, Herman #25 HB; Ruser, Dale #14 C Schluckebier, Glen #58 E Schwartzkopf, Sam #54 T Seeman, George #41 E Shindo, Kenneth #28 E Simmons, Kenneth #19 HB; Thompson, Theos #26 HB; Wibbels, Edsel #45 FB; Worrall, Charles HB

== Coaching staff ==
Name	Title	First year in this position	Years at Nebraska	Alma mater
Lawrence Mcceney "Biff" Jones	Head coach	1937	1937–1941	Army
W. Harold Browne	Assistant coach	1930	1930–1940	
Roy Lyman		1936	1936–1941	
Harold Petz		1938	1936, 1938–1940	
Adolph J. Lewandowski		1937	1937–1944	Nebraska
Charles Armstrong		1937	1937–1942, 1944	
Paul Amen		1938	1938–1941	
Rob Mehring		1938	1938	
Glenn Presnell		1938	1938–1942, 1946	Nebraska

== Game summaries ==
=== Minnesota ===
Nebraska at Minnesota

Team	1	2	3	4	Total
Nebraska	0	0	7	0	7
• Minnesota	7	7	0	2	16

- Date: October 1
- Location: Memorial Stadium • Minneapolis

Minnesota was not happy at having their long winning streak over the Cornhuskers broken in 1937, and was ready to pounce on Nebraska in Minneapolis to open the season. Scoring once in each of the first two quarters, the Golden Gophers were in command 14–0 by the half. Undaunted, the young Husker team managed a touchdown to answer in the third quarter to make it a one-possession game, but near the end of the game, and pressed against their own end zone, Nebraska suffered a blocked shovel pass. The Huskers recovered it in the end zone to hand Minnesota two more points, putting the game out of reach. The Gophers had restored what had become the typical order, and moved to 15–3–2 against Nebraska all time.

=== Iowa State ===
Iowa State at Nebraska

Team	1	2	3	4	Total
• Iowa State	0	0	8	0	8
Nebraska	0	0	0	7	7

- Date: October 8
- Location: Memorial Stadium • Lincoln, Nebraska
- Game attendance: 28,468

Both teams held each other scoreless for the first half, but the Cyclones broke away with a touchdown and a safety to move up in the third. Nebraska answered near the end of the game, but still fell short by one point. Iowa State celebrated snapping the longest winning streak the Cornhuskers had ever held over another team at 15 straight, and it was the first 0–2 start to a Nebraska season since 1924. Still, the Cyclones had a long way to go to ever catch Nebraska overall, as they lagged against the Huskers 5–27–1.

=== Indiana ===
Indiana at Nebraska

Team	1	2	3	4	Total
Indiana	0	0	0	0	0
Nebraska	0	0	0	0	0

- Date: October 15
- Location: Memorial Stadium • Lincoln, Nebraska

Nebraska outplayed Indiana and kept the ball on the visitors' side of the field for most of the game, and even recovered seven of the nine Indiana fumbles, but was still unable to ever put the ball over the line. The Hoosiers to their credit never gave up, and managed to hold the Cornhuskers to a scoreless game. Nebraska remained undefeated in the series after two previous wins against Indiana to date.

=== Oklahoma ===
Nebraska at #14 Oklahoma

Team	1	2	3	4	Total
Nebraska	0	0	0	0	0
• #14 Oklahoma	7	0	0	7	14

- Date: October 22
- Location: Oklahoma Memorial Stadium • Norman, Oklahoma

Oklahoma was ranked and on a roll when Nebraska arrived in Norman, and this time the Sooners were not willing to settle for a tie after the 0–0 result of last year. Nebraska fought to keep it a one-possession game after an early Sooner score, and held almost until the end, when Oklahoma secured another touchdown and put the outcome out of reach. Nebraska's undefeated stretch against the Sooners was snapped after seven games, but they still owned the 12–3–3 series.

=== Missouri ===
Missouri at Nebraska

Team	1	2	3	4	Total
• Missouri	0	7	0	6	13
Nebraska	0	3	7	0	10

- Date: October 29
- Location: Memorial Stadium • Lincoln, Nebraska

It seemed that the season was beginning to collapse around the ears of the young Cornhusker squad, and the story was sadly continued in Lincoln. The Tigers, sensing the vulnerability of a Nebraska team with four straight winless games, was still set back when the Huskers scored first, but a touchdown to pull ahead by four by halftime served to encourage Missouri. The Huskers tried to take control with a 96-yard kickoff return for a touchdown to open the second half, but could not prevent the Tigers from the late game-winning touchdown near the end. Nebraska's 10-game undefeated stretch against Missouri was the latest streak to be broken, and Missouri at last took the Missouri-Nebraska Bell back to Columbia. The Cornhuskers still held a commanding 22–7–3 edge over the Tigers all time.

=== Kansas ===
Nebraska at Kansas

Team	1	2	3	4	Total
• Nebraska	7	0	0	9	16
Kansas	0	0	0	7	7

- Date: November 5
- Location: Memorial Stadium • Lawrence, Kansas

Under the weight of only the second five-winless season start in Cornhusker football history, which had last happened in 1919, the Nebraska squad took the field against the Jayhawks in Lawrence. The Cornhuskers had won 13 in a row against Kansas, but had the streak of victories broken last year when the teams fought to a tie. This was the last active major successful string without a loss, and the Husker team didn't want to lose it, too. Although Nebraska struck first, the teams settled into a scoreless battle afterwards until the fourth quarter. Kansas tied it up and put the pressure on, but a subsequent Nebraska field goal and touchdown kept the undefeated streak against Kansas alive at 15 in a row, while Nebraska improved over Kansas to 33–9–3.

=== Pittsburgh ===
#3 Pittsburgh at Nebraska

Team	1	2	3	4	Total
• #3 Pittsburgh	0	6	6	7	19
Nebraska	0	0	0	0	0

- Date: November 12
- Location: Memorial Stadium • Lincoln, Nebraska

The struggling Cornhuskers had suffered a long string of disappointments at the hands of the Panthers, and Nebraska was glad to have home-field advantage when facing Pitt under the circumstances. The Panthers were held scoreless in the first while the Huskers pulled up within 15 yards of a score before a field goal was blocked. After that, Nebraska could not keep up as the Panthers secured one touchdown in each subsequent quarter to pull away, setting two new undesired Nebraska records against any single team: 6 losses in a row and 12 winless games in a row. Nebraska's series frustration against Pitt was extended to 1–9–3.

=== Iowa ===
Nebraska at Iowa

Team	1	2	Total
• Nebraska			14
Iowa			0

- Date: November 19
- Location: Iowa Stadium • Iowa City, Iowa

The sting of yet another loss in the Pittsburgh grudge match was wiped away with a shutout victory over Iowa at Kinnick Stadium. Both Cornhusker scores came as a result of converted turnovers, one a fumble and one an interception. Nebraska's 6th straight win over Iowa moved the series record to 18–7–3 in favor of Nebraska.

=== Kansas State ===
Kansas State at Nebraska

Team	1	2	Total
Kansas State			7
• Nebraska			14

- Date: November 24
- Location: Memorial Stadium • Lincoln, Nebraska

Nebraska's spirits had been lifted somewhat by the shutout delivered to Iowa last week, and so entered the annual Kansas State game intent on closing the season with a win. Making good on that intent, the Cornhuskers advanced to a 14–0 lead by halftime. The Wildcats were only able to come up with a single touchdown and therefore dropped to 2–19–2 in their Nebraska series.

== After the season ==
Coach Jones' second season was without a doubt a surprising disappointment, though the annual university yearbook praised the student body and football fans in particular for standing behind the team through the rough experience. The five losses in a single season were the most since the disastrous 1–7–1 campaign of 1899 in former head coach A. Edwin Branch's first (and only) season at Nebraska. Coach Jones saw his two-year overall record at Nebraska slip to 9–6–3 (.583) as his conference career total also slipped to 5–3–2 (.600), and the program's overall record fell to 279–95–30 (.728) while the Big 6 record slipped to 92–14–11 (.833).
