= 1939 Sugar Bowl =

American college football game

- 5th Sugar Bowl
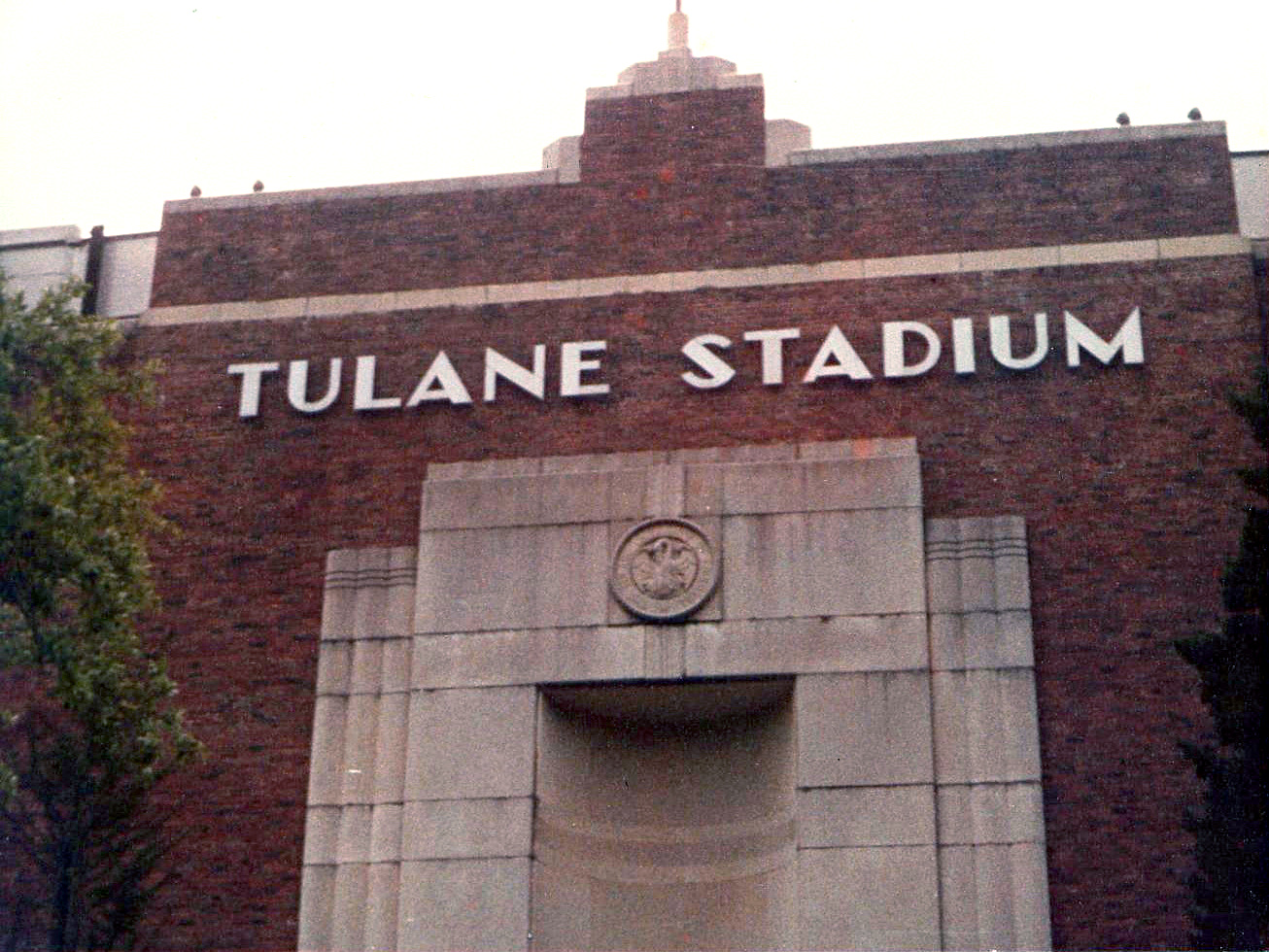
- Tulane Stadium in New Orleans, Louisiana, hosted the Sugar Bowl.
| TCU Horned Frogs | Carnegie Tech Tartans |
| (10–0) | (7-1) |
| SWC | Independent |
| 15 | 7 |
| Head coach: Dutch Meyer | Head coach: Bill Kern |
| AP 1 | AP 6 |
| | 1 | 2 | 3 | 4 | Total |
|---|---|---|---|---|---|
| TCU | 0 | 6 | 6 | 3 | 15 |
| Carnegie Tech | 0 | 7 | 0 | 0 | 7 |
- Date: January 2, 1939
- Season: 1938
- Stadium: Tulane Stadium
- Location: New Orleans, Louisiana
- Favorite: TCU
- Referee: Abb Curtis
- Attendance: 44,308

The 1939 Sugar Bowl was a college football bowl game played on January 2, 1939, in New Orleans, Louisiana. The 5th edition of the Sugar Bowl, it matched the TCU Horned Frogs against the Carnegie Tech Tartans. This was the first Sugar Bowl played on January 2. The next one to be played on that date would not be until 1950.

== Background ==
Davey O'Brien led TCU to a perfect 10–0 regular season as quarterback, throwing 94 of 167 passes for 1,509 yards with 19 touchdowns. with 1,847 yards total yards of offense by him in an era with little passing. Carnegie (who were nicknamed the Skibos and the Tartans) were the underdogs and ranked sixth in the AP poll.

== Game summary ==
TCU scored the first with a Connie Sparks touchdown run, but O'Brien's kick missed, so they were only up 6–0. Carnegie stormed back with a George Muha touchdown catch from Pete Moroz. Carnegie led 7–6 going into halftime, the first time TCU had trailed all season.

TCU rallied back with a Durwood Horner touchdown catch from O'Brien, who missed the extra point once again. But after Carnegie punted the ball back, TCU drove to Carnegie's 1-yard line, where they were stuffed as O'Brien set up to try a short field goal, having missed two PAT's earlier. But this time he made the field goal, increasing the lead to 15–7 with seven minutes remaining. Carnegie almost scored immediately when Muha returned the kickoff to TCU's 21-yard line, but O'Brien intercepted Carnegie's pass as TCU ran the clock down without having to score again, clinching TCU's first undefeated season and their second national championship in three years. It was their last bowl win until 1957. O'Brien went 17 for 28 and threw for 225 yards and Ki Aldrich had 19 tackles.

== Statistics ==
| Statistics | TCU | Carnegie Tech |
|---|---|---|
| First downs | 17 | 10 |
| Yards rushing | 142 | 129 |
| Yards passing | 225 | 59 |
| Total yards | 367 | 188 |
| Punts-Average | 1-40.0 | 6-40.0 |
| Fumbles-Lost | 0-0 | 0-0 |
| Interceptions | 0 | 0 |
| Penalty yards | 5 | 20 |
