= 1938 Missouri Tigers football team =

American college football season

1938 Missouri Tigers football
- Conference: Big Six Conference
- Record: 6–3 (2–3 Big 6)
- Head coach: Don Faurot (4th season)
- Home stadium: Memorial Stadium

1938 Big Six Conference football standings
	Conf.					Overall
Team	W		L		T	W		L		T
No. 4 Oklahoma $	5	–	0	–	0	10	–	1	–	0
Iowa State	3	–	1	–	1	7	–	1	–	1
Missouri	2	–	3	–	0	6	–	3	–	0
Nebraska	2	–	3	–	0	3	–	5	–	1
Kansas State	1	–	3	–	1	4	–	4	–	1
Kansas	1	–	4	–	0	3	–	6	–	0
$ – Conference champion; Rankings from AP Poll

The 1938 Missouri Tigers football team was an American football team that represented the University of Missouri in the Big Six Conference (Big 6) during the 1938 college football season. The team compiled a 6–3 record (2–3 against Big 6 opponents), finished in a tie for third place in the Big 6, and outscored all opponents by a combined total of 111 to 82. Don Faurot was the head coach for the fourth of 19 seasons. The team played its home games at Memorial Stadium in Columbia, Missouri.

The team's leading scorer was Paul Christman with 48 points.

== Schedule ==
Date	Opponent	Site	Result	Attendance	Source
October 1	Colorado*	Memorial Stadium; Columbia, MO	W 14–7		
October 8	at Kansas State	Memorial Stadium; Manhattan, KS	L 13–21		
October 15	Iowa State	Memorial Stadium; Columbia, MO (rivalry)	L 13–16	8,873	
October 22	at Washington University*	Francis Field; St. Louis, MO	W 13–0		
October 29	at Nebraska	Memorial Stadium; Lincoln, NE (rivalry)	W 13–10		
November 5	Michigan State*	Memorial Stadium; Columbia, MO	W 6–0	10,000	
November 12	at No. 10 Oklahoma	Memorial Stadium; Norman, OK (rivalry)	L 0–21		
November 19	at Saint Louis*	Walsh Stadium; St. Louis, MO	W 26–0		
November 24	Kansas	Memorial Stadium; Columbia, MO (rivalry)	W 13–7	17,500	
*Non-conference game; Rankings from AP Poll released prior to the game
