= 1938 SMU Mustangs football team =

American college football season

1938 SMU Mustangs football
- Conference: Southwest Conference
- Record: 6–4 (4–2 SWC)
- Head coach: Matty Bell (4th season)
- Captain: Charles Sprague
- Home stadium: Ownby Stadium, Cotton Bowl

1938 Southwest Conference football standings
	Conf.					Overall
Team	W		L		T	W		L		T
No. 1 TCU $	6	–	0	–	0	11	–	0	–	0
SMU	4	–	2	–	0	6	–	4	–	0
Baylor	3	–	2	–	1	7	–	2	–	1
Rice	3	–	3	–	0	4	–	6	–	0
Texas A&M	2	–	3	–	1	4	–	4	–	1
Arkansas	1	–	5	–	0	2	–	7	–	1
Texas	1	–	5	–	0	1	–	8	–	0
$ – Conference champion; Rankings from AP Poll

The 1938 SMU Mustangs football team was an American football team that represented Southern Methodist University (SMU) as a member of the Southwest Conference (SWC) during the 1938 college football season. In their fourth season under head coach Matty Bell, the Mustangs compiled a 6–4 record (4–2 against conference opponents) and outscored opponents by a total of 148 to 125. The team played its home games at Ownby Stadium in University Park, Texas, and the Cotton Bowl in Dallas.

== Schedule ==
Date	Opponent	Site	Result	Attendance	Source
September 24	North Texas State Teachers*	Ownby Stadium; University Park, TX (rivalry)	W 34–7		
October 1	Arizona*	Ownby Stadium; University Park, TX	W 29–7		
October 7	vs. Marquette*	Soldier Field; Chicago, IL	L 0–7	25,000	
October 22	at No. 1 Pittsburgh*	Pitt Stadium; Pittsburgh, PA	L 7–34	37,500	
October 30	Texas	Ownby Stadium; University Park, TX	W 7–6	12,000	
November 5	No. 19 Texas A&M	Ownby Stadium; University Park, TX	W 10–7	22,000	
November 12	Arkansas	Ownby Stadium; University Park, TX	W 19–6		
November 19	at Baylor	Waco Stadium; Waco, TX	W 21–6		
November 26	No. 2 TCU	Cotton Bowl; Dallas, TX (rivalry)	L 7–20	23,000	
December 3	at Rice	Rice Field; Houston, TX (rivalry)	L 14–25		
*Non-conference game; Rankings from AP Poll released prior to the game
