= 1938 Texas A&M Aggies football team =

American college football season

1938 Texas A&M Aggies football
- Conference: Southwest Conference
- Record: 4–4–1 (2–3–1 SWC)
- Head coach: Homer Norton (5th season)
- Home stadium: Kyle Field

1938 Southwest Conference football standings
	Conf.					Overall
Team	W		L		T	W		L		T
No. 1 TCU $	6	–	0	–	0	11	–	0	–	0
SMU	4	–	2	–	0	6	–	4	–	0
Baylor	3	–	2	–	1	7	–	2	–	1
Rice	3	–	3	–	0	4	–	6	–	0
Texas A&M	2	–	3	–	1	4	–	4	–	1
Arkansas	1	–	5	–	0	2	–	7	–	1
Texas	1	–	5	–	0	1	–	8	–	0
$ – Conference champion; Rankings from AP Poll

The 1938 Texas A&M Aggies football team represented the Agricultural and Mechanical College of Texas—now known as Texas A&M University—in the Southwest Conference (SWC) during the 1938 college football season. In its fifth season under head coach Homer Norton, the team compiled an overall record of 4–4–1, with a mark of 2–3–1 in conference play, and finished fifth in the SWC.

== Schedule ==
Date	Time	Opponent	Rank	Site	Result	Attendance	Source
September 24	3:00 p.m.	Texas A&I*		Kyle Field; College Station, TX	W 52–0	11,000	
October 1		vs. Tulsa*		Lion Stadium; Tyler, TX	W 20–0	14,000	
October 8		Santa Clara*		Kyle Field; College Station, TX	L 0–7	35,000	
October 15		TCU		Kyle Field; College Station, TX (rivalry)	L 6–34	25,000	
October 22		at No. 17 Baylor		Waco Stadium; Waco, TX (Battle of the Brazos)	T 6–6	15,000	
October 29		Arkansas		Kyle Field; College Station, TX (rivalry)	W 13–7	10,000	
November 5		at SMU	No. 19	Ownby Stadium; University Park, TX	L 7–10	22,000	
November 12		Rice		Kyle Field; College Station, TX	W 27–0	17,000	
November 24		at Texas		War Memorial Stadium; Austin, TX (rivalry)	L 6–7	40,000	
*Non-conference game; Rankings from AP Poll released prior to the game; All times are in Central time
