= 1938 Iowa State Cyclones football team =

American college football season

1938 Iowa State Cyclones football
- Conference: Big Six Conference
- Record: 7–1–1 (3–1–1 Big 6)
- Head coach: James J. Yeager (2nd season)
- Captains: Ed Bock; Everett Kischer
- Home stadium: Clyde Williams Field

1938 Big Six Conference football standings
	Conf.					Overall
Team	W		L		T	W		L		T
No. 4 Oklahoma $	5	–	0	–	0	10	–	1	–	0
Iowa State	3	–	1	–	1	7	–	1	–	1
Missouri	2	–	3	–	0	6	–	3	–	0
Nebraska	2	–	3	–	0	3	–	5	–	1
Kansas State	1	–	3	–	1	4	–	4	–	1
Kansas	1	–	4	–	0	3	–	6	–	0
$ – Conference champion; Rankings from AP Poll

The 1938 Iowa State Cyclones football team represented Iowa State College of Agricultural and Mechanic Arts (later renamed Iowa State University) in the Big Six Conference during the 1938 college football season. In their second season under head coach James J. Yeager, the Cyclones compiled a 7–1–1 record (3–1–1 against conference opponents), finished in second place in the conference, and outscored their opponents by a combined total of 125 to 64. They played their home games at Clyde Williams Field in Ames, Iowa.

Guard Ed Bock and back Everett Kischer were the team captains. Four Iowa State players were selected as first-team all-conference players: Bock, Kischer, end Charles Heileman, and tackle Clyde Shugart.

== Schedule ==
Date	Time	Opponent	Rank	Site	Result	Attendance	Source
September 23	9:15 p.m.	at Denver*		DU Stadium; Denver, CO	W 14–7	14,786	
October 1	2:00 p.m.	Luther*		Clyde Williams Field; Ames, IA	W 32–7	7,445	
October 8	2:00 p.m.	at Nebraska		Memorial Stadium; Lincoln, NE (rivalry)	W 8–7	28,468	
October 15	2:00 p.m.	at Missouri		Memorial Stadium; Columbia, MO (rivalry)	W 16–13	8,873	
October 22	2:00 p.m.	Kansas^{†}		Clyde Williams Field; Ames, IA	W 21–7	14,076	
October 29	2:00 p.m.	at Marquette*		Marquette Stadium; Milwaukee, WI	W 7–0	7,070	
November 5	2:00 p.m.	Drake*	No. 18	Clyde Williams Field; Ames, IA	W 14–0	15,937	
November 12	2:00 p.m.	at Kansas State		Memorial Stadium; Manhattan, KS (rivalry)	T 13–13	11,400	
November 19	2:00 p.m.	No. 7 Oklahoma		Clyde Williams Field; Ames, IA	L 0–10	17,864	
*Non-conference game; ^{†}Homecoming; Rankings from AP Poll released prior to the game; All times are in Central time
