= 1938 Tulsa Golden Hurricane football team =

American college football season

1938 Tulsa Golden Hurricane football

MVC champion
- Conference: Missouri Valley Conference
- Record: 4–5–1 (3–1 MVC)
- Head coach: Vic Hurt (3rd season)
- Home stadium: Skelly Field

1938 Missouri Valley Conference football standings
	Conf.					Overall
Team	W		L		T	W		L		T
Washburn *	2	–	0	–	0	6	–	3	–	0
Creighton *	1	–	0	–	1	6	–	1	–	1
Tulsa $	3	–	1	–	0	4	–	5	–	1
Washington University	2	–	1	–	1	6	–	3	–	1
Drake	2	–	1	–	1	5	–	4	–	1
Saint Louis	1	–	1	–	1	3	–	5	–	2
Grinnell	0	–	3	–	0	3	–	5	–	0
Oklahoma A&M	0	–	4	–	0	2	–	8	–	0
$ – Conference champion; * ineligible for championship because of insufficient games

The 1938 Tulsa Golden Hurricane football team represented the University of Tulsa during the 1938 college football season. In their third year under head coach Vic Hurt, the Golden Hurricane compiled a 4–5–1 record (3–1 against conference opponents) and won the Missouri Valley Conference championship. The team defeated Oklahoma A&M (20–7), tied Arkansas (6–6) and lost to No. 10 Oklahoma (28–6) and TCU (21–0).

== Schedule ==
Date	Opponent	Site	Result	Attendance	Source
September 24	Central State Teachers*	Skelly Field; Tulsa, OK	W 20–0	8,000	
October 1	vs. Texas A&M*	Tyler High School; Tyler, TX	L 0–20	14,000	
October 8	Washington University	Skelly Field; Tulsa, OK	W 14–0	7,500	
October 14	at Saint Louis	Walsh Stadium; St. Louis, MO	W 28–0	9,428	
October 22	Oklahoma A&M^{†}	Skelly Field; Tulsa, OK (rivalry)	W 20–7	14,000	
October 29	at No. 11 Oklahoma*	Memorial Stadium; Norman, OK	L 6–28	17,000	
November 5	at No. 1 TCU*	Amon G. Carter Stadium; Fort Worth, TX	L 0–21	14,000	
November 12	at Drake	Drake Stadium; Des Moines, IA	L 7–27	6,000	
November 19	at Detroit*	University of Detroit Stadium; Detroit, MI	L 14–39	17,000	
November 24	Arkansas*	Skelly Field; Tulsa, OK	T 6–6	15,000	
*Non-conference game; ^{†}Homecoming; Rankings from AP Poll released prior to the game

== After the season ==
The 1939 NFL draft was held on December 9, 1938. The following Golden Hurricane player was selected.

Round	Pick	Player	Position	NFL club
19	174	Morris White	Back	Philadelphia Eagles
