= 1938 Oklahoma Sooners football team =

American college football season

1938 Oklahoma Sooners football

Big 6 champion

Orange Bowl, L 0–17 vs. Tennessee

Ranking
- AP: No. 4
- Record: 10–1 (5–0 Big 6)
- Head coach: Tom Stidham (2nd season)
- Captains: Gene Corrotto; Earl Crowder
- Home stadium: Memorial Stadium

1938 Big Six Conference football standings
	Conf.					Overall
Team	W		L		T	W		L		T
No. 4 Oklahoma $	5	–	0	–	0	10	–	1	–	0
Iowa State	3	–	1	–	1	7	–	1	–	1
Missouri	2	–	3	–	0	6	–	3	–	0
Nebraska	2	–	3	–	0	3	–	5	–	1
Kansas State	1	–	3	–	1	4	–	4	–	1
Kansas	1	–	4	–	0	3	–	6	–	0
$ – Conference champion; Rankings from AP Poll

The 1938 Oklahoma Sooners football team represented the University of Oklahoma in the 1938 college football season. In their second year under head coach Tom Stidham, the Sooners compiled a 10–1 record (5–0 against conference opponents), won the school's first Big Six Conference football championship, and outscored their opponents by a combined total of 185 to 29. The team's only loss came in the 1939 Orange Bowl, losing to Tennessee by a 17 to 0 score.

End Waddy Young (Walter R. Young) received All-America honors in 1938, and six Sooners received all-conference honors: Young, guards Jerry Bolton and Ralph Stevenson, backs Earl Crowder and Hugh McCullough, and tackle Gilford Duggan.

== Schedule ==
Date	Opponent	Rank	Site	Result	Attendance	Source
October 1	at Rice*		Rice Field; Houston, TX	W 7–6	18,000	
October 8	vs. Texas*		Cotton Bowl; Dallas, TX (rivalry)	W 13–0	20,000	
October 15	at Kansas		Memorial Stadium; Lawrence, KS	W 19–0		
October 22	Nebraska	No. 14	Memorial Stadium; Norman, OK (rivalry)	W 14–0	28,091	
October 29	Tulsa*	No. 10	Memorial Stadium; Norman, OK	W 28–6	17,000	
November 5	Kansas State	No. 11	Memorial Stadium; Norman, OK	W 26–0		
November 12	Missouri	No. 10	Memorial Stadium; Norman, OK (rivalry)	W 21–0		
November 19	at Iowa State	No. 7	Clyde Williams Stadium; Ames, IA	W 10–0	17,864	
November 26	at Oklahoma A&M*	No. 6	Lewis Field; Stillwater, OK (Bedlam)	W 19–0		
December 3	at Washington State*	No. 5	Memorial Stadium; Norman, OK	W 28–0	15,529	
January 2, 1939	vs. No. 2 Tennessee*	No. 4	Burdine Stadium; Miami, FL (Orange Bowl)	L 0–17	32,191	
*Non-conference game; Rankings from AP Poll released prior to the game

== Rankings ==
The first AP poll for 1938 came out on October 17. The Sooners were ranked fourteenth in the first poll. They finished the year ranked fourth.

Ranking movements Legend: ██ Increase in ranking ██ Decrease in ranking ( ) = First-place votes
	Week							
Poll	1	2	3	4	5	6	7	Final
AP	14	10	11	10 (1)	7 (1)	6	5	4

== NFL draft ==
The following players were drafted into the National Football League following the season.

Round	Pick	Player	Position	NFL team
3	20	Waddy Young	End	Brooklyn Dodgers
4	26	Hugh McCullough	Back	Pittsburgh Pirates
10	82	Earl Crowder	Quarterback	Chicago Cardinals
12	102	Jim Thomas	Guard	Chicago Cardinals
15	140	Cliff Duggan	Tackle	New York Giants
