= 1938 Arkansas Razorbacks football team =

American college football season

1938 Arkansas Razorbacks football
- Conference: Southwest Conference
- Record: 2–7–1 (1–5 SWC)
- Head coach: Fred Thomsen (10th season)
- Captain: Lloyd Woodell
- Home stadium: Bailey Stadium, Quigley Stadium

1938 Southwest Conference football standings
	Conf.					Overall
Team	W		L		T	W		L		T
No. 1 TCU $	6	–	0	–	0	11	–	0	–	0
SMU	4	–	2	–	0	6	–	4	–	0
Baylor	3	–	2	–	1	7	–	2	–	1
Rice	3	–	3	–	0	4	–	6	–	0
Texas A&M	2	–	3	–	1	4	–	4	–	1
Arkansas	1	–	5	–	0	2	–	7	–	1
Texas	1	–	5	–	0	1	–	8	–	0
$ – Conference champion; Rankings from AP Poll

The 1938 Arkansas Razorbacks football team represented the University of Arkansas in the Southwest Conference (SWC) during the 1938 college football season. In their tenth year under head coach Fred Thomsen, the Razorbacks compiled a 2–7–1 record (1–5 against SWC opponents), finished in a tie for last place in the SWC, and still outscored their opponents by a combined total of 128 to 125.

During the 1938 season, the Razorbacks relocated from The Hill, an on-campus 300-seat stadium used since 1901, and began play in Bailey Stadium, known today as Donald W. Reynolds Razorback Stadium. The stadium was initially known as University Stadium, but was quickly renamed Bailey Stadium in honor of then-Arkansas governor Carl Edward Bailey. The Hill was demolished and Mullins Library was placed on the old site.

== Schedule ==
Date	Opponent	Site	Result	Attendance	Source
September 24	Oklahoma A&M*	University Stadium; Fayetteville, AR	W 27–7		
October 1	at TCU	T.C.U. Stadium; Fort Worth, TX	L 14–21	12,000	
October 8,	Baylor	Bailey Stadium; Fayetteville, AR (dedication)	L 6–9		
October 15	Texas	Quigley Stadium; Little Rock, AR (rivalry)	W 42–6		
October 22	at No. 6 Santa Clara*	Kezar Stadium; San Francisco, CA	L 6–13		
October 29	at Texas A&M	Kyle Field; College Station, TX (rivalry)	L 7–13	10,000	
November 5	Rice^{†}	Bailey Stadium; Fayetteville, AR	L 0–3	10,000	
November 12	at SMU	Ownby Stadium; University Park, TX	L 6–19		
November 16	vs. Ole Miss*	Crump Stadium; Memphis, TN (rivalry)	L 14–20	12,000	
November 24	at Tulsa*	Skelly Field; Tulsa, OK	T 6–6	15,000	
*Non-conference game; ^{†}Homecoming; Rankings from AP Poll released prior to the game

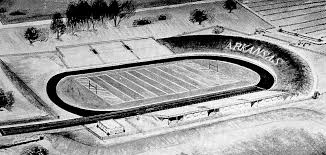
Bailey Stadium (now known as DWR Razorback Stadium) in 1938
