= 1938 Kansas Jayhawks football team =

American college football season

1938 Kansas Jayhawks football
- Conference: Big Six Conference
- Record: 3–6 (1–4 Big 6)
- Head coach: Adrian Lindsey (7th season)
- Captain: Dave Shirk
- Home stadium: Memorial Stadium

1938 Big Six Conference football standings
	Conf.					Overall
Team	W		L		T	W		L		T
No. 4 Oklahoma $	5	–	0	–	0	10	–	1	–	0
Iowa State	3	–	1	–	1	7	–	1	–	1
Missouri	2	–	3	–	0	6	–	3	–	0
Nebraska	2	–	3	–	0	3	–	5	–	1
Kansas State	1	–	3	–	1	4	–	4	–	1
Kansas	1	–	4	–	0	3	–	6	–	0
$ – Conference champion; Rankings from AP Poll

The 1938 Kansas Jayhawks football team represented the University of Kansas in the Big Six Conference during the 1938 college football season. In their seventh and final season under head coach Adrian Lindsey, the Jayhawks compiled a 3–6 record (1–4 against conference opponents), finished in last place in the conference, and were outscored by opponents by a combined total of 169 to 132. They played their home games at Memorial Stadium in Lawrence, Kansas.

The team's statistical leaders included Dick Amerine with 277 rushing yards, Ralph Miller with 407 passing yards, Max Replogle with 259 receiving yards, and Bill Bunsen with 24 points scored (four touchdowns). Dave Shirk was the team captain.

== Schedule ==
Date	Opponent	Site	Result	Attendance	Source
September 24	Texas*	Memorial Stadium; Lawrence, KS	W 19–18	10,000	
October 1	at Notre Dame*	Notre Dame Stadium; Notre Dame, IN	L 0–52	25,615	
October 8	Washburn*	Memorial Stadium; Lawrence, KS	W 58–14		
October 15	Oklahoma	Memorial Stadium; Lawrence, KS	L 0–19		
October 22	at Iowa State	Clyde Williams Field; Ames, IA	L 7–21		
October 29	at Kansas State	Memorial Stadium; Manhattan, KS (rivalry)	W 27–7		
November 5	Nebraska^{†}	Memorial Stadium; Lawrence, KS (rivalry)	L 7–16		
November 12	at George Washington*	Griffith Stadium; Washington, DC	L 7–9		
November 24	at Missouri	Memorial Stadium; Columbia, MO (rivalry)	L 7–13	17,500	
*Non-conference game; ^{†}Homecoming

== After the season ==
=== NFL draft ===
The following Jayhawks were selected in the 1939 NFL draft following the season.

Round	Pick	Player	Position	NFL club
18	161	Dave Shirk	End	Pittsburgh Pirates
19	175	Ferrell Anderson	Guard	Brooklyn Dodgers
