= 1938 Washington University Bears football team =

American college football season

1938 Washington University Bears football
- Conference: Missouri Valley Conference
- Record: 6–3–1 (2–1–1 MVC)
- Head coach: Jimmy Conzelman (7th season)
- Home stadium: Francis Field

1938 Missouri Valley Conference football standings
	Conf.					Overall
Team	W		L		T	W		L		T
Washburn *	2	–	0	–	0	6	–	3	–	0
Creighton *	1	–	0	–	1	6	–	1	–	1
Tulsa $	3	–	1	–	0	4	–	5	–	1
Washington University	2	–	1	–	1	6	–	3	–	1
Drake	2	–	1	–	1	5	–	4	–	1
Saint Louis	1	–	1	–	1	3	–	5	–	2
Grinnell	0	–	3	–	0	3	–	5	–	0
Oklahoma A&M	0	–	4	–	0	2	–	8	–	0
$ – Conference champion; * ineligible for championship because of insufficient games

The 1938 Washington University Bears football team represented Washington University in St. Louis as a member of the Missouri Valley Conference (MVC) during the 1938 college football season. In its seventh season under head coach Jimmy Conzelman, the team compiled a 6–3–1 record (2–1–1 against MVC opponents) and outscored opponents by a total of 242 to 94. The team played its home games at Francis Field in St. Louis.

== Schedule ==
Date	Opponent	Site	Result	Attendance	Source
September 24	Vanderbilt*	Francis Field; St. Louis, MO	L 0–20	5,000	
October 1	Drake	Francis Field; St. Louis, MO	W 25–13		
October 8	at Tulsa	Skelly Field; Tulsa, OK	L 0–14	7,500	
October 15	Simpson	Francis Field; St. Louis, MO	W 58–6		
October 22	Missouri*^{†}	Francis Field; St. Louis, MO	L 0–13		
October 29	Centre*	Francis Field; St. Louis, MO	W 20–7	4,500	
November 4	Oklahoma A&M	Francis Field; St. Louis, MO	W 24–0	3,301	
November 12	Butler*	Francis Field; St. Louis, MO	W 27–21		
November 19	McKendree*	Francis Field; St. Louis, MO	W 88–0		
November 24	at Saint Louis	Walsh Stadium; St. Louis, MO	T 0–0		
*Non-conference game; ^{†}Homecoming
