= 1938 Drake Bulldogs football team =

American college football season

1938 Drake Bulldogs football
- Conference: Missouri Valley Conference
- Record: 5–4–1 (2–1–1 MVC)
- Head coach: Vee Green (6th season)
- Home stadium: Drake Stadium

1938 Missouri Valley Conference football standings
	Conf.					Overall
Team	W		L		T	W		L		T
Washburn *	2	–	0	–	0	6	–	3	–	0
Creighton *	1	–	0	–	1	6	–	1	–	1
Tulsa $	3	–	1	–	0	4	–	5	–	1
Washington University	2	–	1	–	1	6	–	3	–	1
Drake	2	–	1	–	1	5	–	4	–	1
Saint Louis	1	–	1	–	1	3	–	5	–	2
Grinnell	0	–	3	–	0	3	–	5	–	0
Oklahoma A&M	0	–	4	–	0	2	–	8	–	0
$ – Conference champion; * ineligible for championship because of insufficient games

The 1938 Drake Bulldogs football team represented Drake University in the Missouri Valley Conference (MVC) during the 1938 college football season. In its sixth season under head coach Vee Green, the team compiled a 5–4–1 record (2–1–1 against MVC opponents), and outscored opponents by a total of 194 to 118.

== Schedule ==
Date	Opponent	Site	Result	Attendance	Source
September 17	Central (IA)*	Drake Stadium; Des Moines, IA	W 45–0		
September 24	Monmouth (IL)*	Drake Stadium; Des Moines, IA	W 47–0		
October 1	at Washington University	Francis Field; St. Louis, MO	L 13–25		
October 8	at Northwestern*	Dyche Stadium; Evanston, IL	L 0–33		
October 15	Creighton	Drake Stadium; Des Moines, IA	T 7–7		
October 22	Miami (FL)*	Drake Stadium; Des Moines, IA	W 18–6		
October 29	Grinnell	Drake Stadium; Des Moines, IA	W 21–6		
November 5	at No. 18 Iowa State*	Clyde Williams Field; Ames, IA	L 0–14	15,937	
November 12	Tulsa	Drake Stadium; Des Moines, IA	W 27–7	6,000	
December 2	at New Mexico A&M*	Quesenberry Field; Las Cruces, NM	L 16–20		
*Non-conference game; Rankings from AP Poll released prior to the game
