= 1938 Wichita Shockers football team =

American college football season

1938 Wichita Shockers football

CIC champion
- Conference: Central Intercollegiate Conference
- Record: 7–2–1 (4–0 CIC)
- Head coach: Al Gebert (9th season)
- Captain: Tromer Smith
- Home stadium: Shocker Stadium

1938 Central Intercollegiate Conference football standings
	Conf.					Overall
Team	W		L		T	W		L		T
Wichita $	4	–	0	–	0	7	–	2	–	1
Fort Hays State	3	–	1	–	0	7	–	2	–	0
Pittsburg State	2	–	2	–	0	4	–	4	–	2
Emporia State	1	–	3	–	0	3	–	6	–	0
Southwestern (KS)	0	–	4	–	0	1	–	8	–	0
$ – Conference champion

The 1938 Wichita Shockers football team was an American football team that represented Wichita University (now known as Wichita State University) as a member of the Central Intercollegiate Conference (CIC) during the 1938 college football season. In their ninth season under head coach Al Gebert, the Shockers compiled a 7–2–1 record, won the CIC championship, and outscored opponents by a total of 199 to 76. Halfback Tromer Smith was the team captain.

== Schedule ==
Date	Opponent	Site	Result	Attendance	Source
September 24	at Army*	Michie Stadium; West Point, NY	L 0–32	5,000	
October 1	Southwestern (KS)	Shocker Stadium; Wichita, KS	W 66–0		
October 8	Saint Louis*	Shocker Stadium; Wichita, KS	T 0–0		
October 15	at Pittsburg State	Brandenburg Stadium; Pittsburg, KS	W 12–0		
October 21	at Washburn*	Moore Bowl; Topeka, KS	W 35–6		
October 29	Creighton*	Shocker Stadium; Wichita, KS	L 0–6	5,500	
November 5	at Fort Hays	Lewis Field Stadium; Hays, KS	W 15–7		
November 12	Emporia State^{†}	Shocker Stadium; Wichita, KS	W 26–6	5,000	
November 19	at Oklahoma A&M*	Lewis Field; Stillwater, OK	W 14–6		
November 24	DePaul*	Shocker Stadium; Wichita, KS	W 31–13	5,000	
*Non-conference game; ^{†}Homecoming
