= 1938 Washburn Ichabods football team =

American college football season

1938 Washburn Ichabods football
- Conference: Missouri Valley Conference
- Record: 6–3 (2–0 MVC)
- Head coach: Elmer Holm (3rd season)
- Home stadium: Moore Bowl

1938 Missouri Valley Conference football standings
	Conf.					Overall
Team	W		L		T	W		L		T
Washburn *	2	–	0	–	0	6	–	3	–	0
Creighton *	1	–	0	–	1	6	–	1	–	1
Tulsa $	3	–	1	–	0	4	–	5	–	1
Washington University	2	–	1	–	1	6	–	3	–	1
Drake	2	–	1	–	1	5	–	4	–	1
Saint Louis	1	–	1	–	1	3	–	5	–	2
Grinnell	0	–	3	–	0	3	–	5	–	0
Oklahoma A&M	0	–	4	–	0	2	–	8	–	0
$ – Conference champion; * ineligible for championship because of insufficient games

The 1938 Washburn Ichabods football team represented Washburn University during the 1938 college football season. Washburn played their home games at the Moore Bowl in Topeka, Kansas. In their third year under head coach Elmer Holm, the Ichabods compiled a 6–3 record and were 2–0 in the Missouri Valley Conference.

== Schedule ==
Date	Opponent	Site	Result	Source
September 24	Baker*	Moore Bowl; Topeka, KS	W 34–0	
October 1	Kansas State Teachers*	Moore Bowl; Topeka, KS	W 19–6	
October 8	at Kansas*	Kansas Memorial Stadium; Lawrence, KS	L 14–58	
October 15	at Colorado College*	Washburn Field; Colorado Springs, CO	W 20–0	
October 21	Wichita*	Moore Bowl; Topeka, KS	L 6–35	
October 29	at Oklahoma A&M	Lewis Field; Stillwater, OK	W 14–0	
November 12	Grinnell	Moore Bowl; Topeka, KS	W 6–0	
November 19	at Kansas State*	Memorial Stadium; Manhattan, KS	L 14–41	
November 25	St. Mary's (TX)*	Moore Bowl; Topeka, KS	W 33–20	
*Non-conference game
