= 1938 Kansas State Wildcats football team =

American college football season

1938 Kansas State Wildcats football
- Conference: Big Six Conference
- Record: 4–4–1 (1–3–1 Big 6)
- Head coach: Wesley Fry (4th season)
- Home stadium: Memorial Stadium

1938 Big Six Conference football standings
| | Conf. | | | | | Overall |
| Team | W | | L | | T | W | | L | | T |
|---|---|---|---|---|---|---|---|---|---|---|
| No. 4 Oklahoma $ | 5 | – | 0 | – | 0 | 10 | – | 1 | – | 0 |
| Iowa State | 3 | – | 1 | – | 1 | 7 | – | 1 | – | 1 |
| Missouri | 2 | – | 3 | – | 0 | 6 | – | 3 | – | 0 |
| Nebraska | 2 | – | 3 | – | 0 | 3 | – | 5 | – | 1 |
| Kansas State | 1 | – | 3 | – | 1 | 4 | – | 4 | – | 1 |
| Kansas | 1 | – | 4 | – | 0 | 3 | – | 6 | – | 0 |
$ – Conference champion; Rankings from AP Poll

The 1938 Kansas State Wildcats football team represented Kansas State University in the 1938 college football season. The team's head football coach was Wesley Fry, in his fourth year at the helm of the Wildcats. The Wildcats played their home games in Memorial Stadium. The Wildcats finished the season with a 4–4–1 record with a 1–3–1 record in conference play. They finished in fifth place in the Big Six Conference. The Wildcats scored 108 points and gave up 134 points.

== Schedule ==
| Date | Opponent | Site | Result | Attendance | Source |
|---|---|---|---|---|---|
| October 1 | at Northwestern* | Ryan Field; Evanston, IL | L 0–21 | 35,000 | |
| October 8 | Missouri | Memorial Stadium; Manhattan, KS | W 21–13 | 8,000 | |
| October 14 | at Marquette* | Marquette Stadium; Milwaukee, WI | W 6–0 | 13,000 | |
| October 22 | at Indiana* | Memorial Stadium; Bloomington, Indiana | W 13–6 | 18,000 | |
| October 29 | Kansas^{†} | Memorial Stadium; Manhattan, KS (rivalry) | L 7–27 | 17,000 | |
| November 5 | at No. 11 Oklahoma | Oklahoma Memorial Stadium; Norman, OK | L 0–26 | 12,000 | |
| November 12 | Iowa State | Memorial Stadium; Manhattan, KS (rivalry) | T 13–13 | 10,000 | |
| November 19 | Washburn* | Memorial Stadium; Manhattan, KS | W 41–14 | 5,500 | |
| November 24 | at Nebraska | Memorial Stadium; Lincoln, NE (rivalry) | L 7–14 | | |
*Non-conference game; ^{†}Homecoming; Rankings from AP Poll released prior to the game
