= 1938 TCU Horned Frogs football team =

American college football season

1938 TCU Horned Frogs football

AP Poll national champion SWC champion Sugar Bowl champion

Sugar Bowl, W 15–7 vs. Carnegie Tech
- Conference: Southwest Conference

Ranking
- AP: No. 1
- Record: 11–0 (6–0 SWC)
- Head coach: Dutch Meyer (5th season)
- Offensive scheme: Meyer spread
- Home stadium: T.C.U. Stadium

1938 Southwest Conference football standings
	Conf.					Overall
Team	W		L		T	W		L		T
No. 1 TCU $	6	–	0	–	0	11	–	0	–	0
SMU	4	–	2	–	0	6	–	4	–	0
Baylor	3	–	2	–	1	7	–	2	–	1
Rice	3	–	3	–	0	4	–	6	–	0
Texas A&M	2	–	3	–	1	4	–	4	–	1
Arkansas	1	–	5	–	0	2	–	7	–	1
Texas	1	–	5	–	0	1	–	8	–	0
$ – Conference champion; Rankings from AP Poll

The 1938 TCU Horned Frogs football team was an American football team that represented Texas Christian University (TCU) in the Southwest Conference (SWC) during 1938 college football season. In their fifth year under head coach Dutch Meyer, the Horned Frogs compiled a perfect 11–0 record, won the SWC championship, finished the season ranked No. 1 in the AP Poll, defeated Carnegie Tech in the 1939 Sugar Bowl, and outscored opponents by a total of 269 to 60.

At the end of the 1938 season, TCU quarterback Davey O'Brien won both the Heisman Trophy and the Maxwell Award as the outstanding football player in the United States. He was the fourth player to receive the Heisman Trophy and the first from outside the Midwest or East. During the 1938 season, O'Brien completed 93 passes for 1,509 yards and 19 touchdowns.

Two TCU players, O'Brien and center Ki Aldrich, were consensus first-team picks on the 1938 All-America college football team. TCU tackle I. B. Hale was also selected as a first-team All-American by Liberty magazine.

The Horned Frogs played their home games in T.C.U. Stadium (later renamed Amon G. Carter Stadium), which is located on campus in Fort Worth, Texas.

== Schedule ==
Date	Opponent	Rank	Site	Result	Attendance	Source
September 24	Centenary*		T.C.U. Stadium; Fort Worth, TX	W 13–0		
October 1	Arkansas		T.C.U. Stadium; Fort Worth, TX	W 21–14	12,000	
October 7	at Temple*		Temple Stadium; Philadelphia, PA	W 28–6	20,000	
October 15	at Texas A&M		Kyle Field; College Station, TX (rivalry)	W 34–6	25,000	
October 22	at Marquette*	No. 7	Marquette Stadium; Milwaukee, WI	W 21–0		
October 29	Baylor	No. 4	T.C.U. Stadium; Fort Worth, TX (rivalry)	W 39–7	25,000	
November 5	at Tulsa*	No. 2	Skelly Field; Tulsa, OK	W 21–0	14,000	
November 12	Texas	No. 1	T.C.U. Stadium; Fort Worth, TX (rivalry)	W 28–6	12,000	
November 19	at Rice	No. 2	Rice Field; Houston, TX	W 29–7		
November 26	at SMU	No. 2	Ownby Stadium; University Park, TX (rivalry)	W 20–7	23,000	
January 2, 1939	vs. No. 6 Carnegie Tech*	No. 1	Tulane Stadium; New Orleans LA (Sugar Bowl)	W 15–7	44,308	
*Non-conference game; Rankings from AP Poll released prior to the game

== 1939 NFL draft ==
Player	Position	Round	Pick	NFL club
Ki Aldrich	Center	1	1	Chicago Cardinals
Davey O'Brien	Quarterback	1	4	Philadelphia Eagles
I. B. Hale	Tackle	1	8	Washington Redskins
Forrest Kline	Guard	9	75	Brooklyn Dodgers football club
Johnny Hall	Wing/half back	9	79	Green Bay Packers
Thomas (Allie) White	Tackle	13	114	Philadelphia Eagles

== Awards and honors ==
- Davey O'Brien, Heisman Trophy
- Davey O'Brien, Maxwell Award
