= 2009 St. Louis Rams season =

NFL team season

- Owner: Chip Rosenbloom and Lucia Rodriguez
- General manager: Billy Devaney
- Head coach: Steve Spagnuolo
- Home stadium: Edward Jones Dome

Results
- Record: 1–15
- Division place: 4th NFC West
- Playoffs: Did not qualify
- All-Pros: Steven Jackson (2nd team); Donnie Jones (2nd team)
- Pro Bowlers: RB Steven Jackson

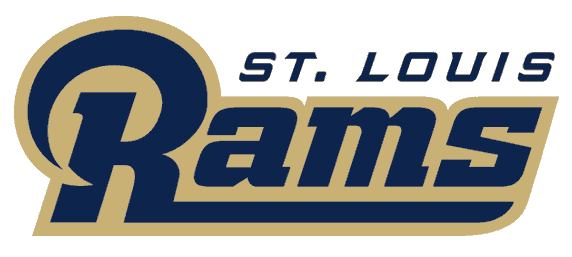
logo for the NFL franchise St. Louis Rams.

The 2009 season was the St. Louis Rams' 72nd in the National Football League (NFL), and their 15th in St. Louis. Due to the Rams winning only against the Detroit Lions, they finished with the NFL's worst record at 1–15, earning the first overall selection in the 2010 NFL draft in Steve Spagnuolo's first season as a head coach.

The 2009 Rams scored 175 points (10.9 per game), the sixth fewest for a 16-game NFL season. The Rams threw only twelve combined touchdown passes all season – including one by kicker Josh Brown. Quarterback Marc Bulger led the team with five touchdown passes. Pro Football Reference argues that the 2009 Rams were the worst team fielded in the NFL since the expansion Tampa Bay Buccaneers of 1976 and 1977, having a much weaker schedule than the winless 2008 Lions.

In the three seasons from 2007 to 2009, the Rams won a total of six games, this being the worst record over such a period since the Chicago Cardinals during World War II until the 2015 to 2017 Cleveland Browns won only four games.

This was the first season since 1998 that Torry Holt was not on the opening day roster.

== Offseason ==
=== Player movement ===
The Rams announced that Jim Haslett would not be returning as head coach after a disastrous 2–14 finish to the 2008 season. On January 16, New York Giants’ defensive coordinator Steve Spagnuolo signed a four-year, $11.5 million deal to be their new head coach.

Jason Brown, a center who formerly played for the Baltimore Ravens before becoming a free agent, was signed on February 27, 2009, to a five-year deal to bolster the offensive line.

Ron Bartell, a cornerback, signed a four-year deal on March 2, worth $13.6 million. Guaranteed, with incentives it could be as much as $28 million.

James Butler, a safety, signed a four-year deal on March 10, that with incentives could be worth almost $17 million.

Orlando Pace, the premier offensive tackle in the NFL, was released by the Rams to save six million dollars in salary cap space.

On March 13, wide receiver Torry Holt was released after ten seasons with the Rams. Holt was later signed by the Jacksonville Jaguars.

On May 8, Pisa Tinoisamoa, the Rams’ leading tackler in 2008, was given his release.

=== Draft ===
2009 St. Louis Rams draft
Round	Pick	Player	Position	College	Notes
1	2	Jason Smith	OT	Baylor	
2	35	James Laurinaitis	LB	Ohio State	
3	66	Bradley Fletcher	CB	Iowa	
4	103	Darell Scott	DT	Clemson	
5	160	Brooks Foster	WR	North Carolina	
6	196	Keith Null	QB	West Texas A&M	
7	211	Chris Ogbonnaya	WR	Texas	
Made roster † Pro Football Hall of Fame * Made at least one Pro Bowl during career

=== Undrafted free agents ===
Name	Position	College
Roger Allen	Guard	Missouri Western State
K. C. Asiodu	Linebacker	Central Oklahoma
Jarrett Byers	Wide receiver	Northeastern State
Ian Campbell	Defensive linemen	Kansas State
Dominic Douglas	Linebacker	Mississippi State
Ray Feinga	Guard	BYU
Jerome Johnson	Fullback	Nevada
Mike Newkirk	Defensive tackle	Wisconsin
Cord Parks	Cornerback	Northeastern
Kirston Pittman	Defensive linemen	LSU
Mark Rubin	Safety	Penn State
Daniel Sanders	Center	Colorado
Phil Trautwein	Tackle	Florida

== Staff ==
St. Louis Rams 2009 staff
Front office: Owner/chairman – Chip Rosenbloom; Owner/vice chairman – Stan Kroenke; Executive vice president of football operations/coo – Kevin Demoff; general manager – Billy Devaney; Vice president of player personnel – Tony Softli; Director of player personnel – Lawrence McCutcheon; Director of pro personnel – Mike Williams; Head coaches: Head coach – Steve Spagnuolo; Assistant head coach/quarterbacks – Dick Curl; Offensive coaches: Offensive coordinator – Pat Shurmur; Running backs – Sylvester Croom; Wide receivers – Charlie Baggett; Tight ends – Frank Leonard; Offensive line – Steve Loney; Assistant offensive line – Art Valero; Quality control/offense – Andy Sugarman	Defensive coaches: Defensive coordinator – Ken Flajole; Defensive line – Brendan Daly; Linebackers – Paul Ferraro; Defensive backs/cornerbacks – Clayton Lopez; Defensive backs/safeties – Andre Curtis; Quality control/defense – Matt House; Special teams coaches: Special teams coordinator – Tom McMahon; Quality control/special teams – Derius Swinton; Strength and conditioning: Strength – Rock Gullickson; Assistant strength – Chuck Faucette

== Final roster ==
2009 St. Louis Rams roster
Quarterbacks (QB): 12 Kyle Boller; 9 Keith Null; 13 Michael Reilly; Running backs (RB): 34 Kenneth Darby; 35 Samkon Gado; 39 Steven Jackson; 44 Mike Karney FB; 22 Chris Ogbonnaya; Wide receivers (WR): 16 Danny Amendola RS; 17 Donnie Avery; 11 Brandon Gibson; 87 Jordan Kent; 82 Ruvell Martin; Tight ends (TE): 47 Billy Bajema; 84 Randy McMichael	Offensive linemen (OL): 62 Roger Allen G; 70 Alex Barron T; 60 Jason Brown C; 73 Adam Goldberg G/T; 79 John Greco G; 68 Ryan McKee T; 66 Mark Setterstrom C/G; 77 Jason Smith T; 64 Phil Trautwein T; 61 Eric Young T; Defensive linemen (DL): 94 Victor Adeyanju DE; 69 Leger Douzable DT; 96 James Hall DE; 91 Leonard Little DE; 72 Chris Long DE; 99 LaJuan Ramsey DT; 95 Clifton Ryan DT; 97 Darell Scott DT; 76 James Wyche DE	Linebackers (LB): 50 K. C. Asiodu OLB; 57 Chris Chamberlain MLB/OLB; 59 Larry Grant OLB; 55 James Laurinaitis MLB; 53 Paris Lenon OLB; 58 David Vobora OLB; Defensive backs (DB): 24 Ron Bartell CB; 37 James Butler SS; 36 Quincy Butler CB; 43 Craig Dahl FS/SS; 25 Danny Gorrer CB; 42 Clinton Hart SS; 31 Justin King CB; 23 Cord Parks CB; 27 David Roach FS; 20 Jonathan Wade CB; Special teams (ST): 3 Josh Brown K; 5 Donnie Jones P; 92 Ryan Neill LS	Practice squad: 93 Chris Bradwell DT; 30 Marcus Brown CB; 49 Eric Butler TE; 65 Sean Conover DE; -- Mark Lewis G; 67 Drew Miller C; 56 Jay Moore LB; 86 Sean Walker WR; Reserve: 98 C. J. Ah You DE (IR); 21 Oshiomogho Atogwe S (IR); 41 Eric Bassey S (IR); 63 Jacob Bell G (IR); 10 Marc Bulger QB (IR); 14 Keenan Burton WR (IR); 90 Adam Carriker DT (IR); 46 Daniel Fells TE (IR); 32 Bradley Fletcher CB (IR); 83 Brooks Foster WR (IR); 71 Gary Gibson DT (IR); 45 Chris Massey LS (IR); 19 Laurent Robinson WR (IR); Rookies in italics 53 active, 13 reserve, 8 practice squad

== Schedule ==
=== Preseason ===
Week	Date	Opponent	Result	Record	Venue	NFL.com recap
1	August 14	at New York Jets	**W** 23–20	1–0	Giants Stadium	Recap
2	August 21	Atlanta Falcons	**L** 13–20	1–1	Edward Jones Dome	Recap
3	August 27	at Cincinnati Bengals	**W** 24–21	2–1	Paul Brown Stadium	Recap
4	September 3	Kansas City Chiefs	**W** 17–9	3–1	Edward Jones Dome	Recap

=== Regular season ===
Week	Date	Opponent	Result	Record	Venue	NFL.com recap
1	September 13	at **Seattle Seahawks**	**L** 0–28	0–1	Qwest Field	Recap
2	September 20	at Washington Redskins	**L** 7–9	0–2	FedExField	Recap
3	September 27	Green Bay Packers	**L** 17–36	0–3	Edward Jones Dome	Recap
4	October 4	at **San Francisco 49ers**	**L** 0–35	0–4	Candlestick Park	Recap
5	October 11	Minnesota Vikings	**L** 10–38	0–5	Edward Jones Dome	Recap
6	October 18	at Jacksonville Jaguars	**L** 20–23 (OT)	0–6	Jacksonville Municipal Stadium	Recap
7	October 25	Indianapolis Colts	**L** 6–42	0–7	Edward Jones Dome	Recap
8	November 1	at Detroit Lions	**W** 17–10	1–7	Ford Field	Recap
9	Bye					
10	November 15	New Orleans Saints	**L** 23–28	1–8	Edward Jones Dome	Recap
11	November 22	**Arizona Cardinals**	**L** 13–21	1–9	Edward Jones Dome	Recap
12	November 29	**Seattle Seahawks**	**L** 17–27	1–10	Edward Jones Dome	Recap
13	December 6	at Chicago Bears	**L** 9–17	1–11	Soldier Field	Recap
14	December 13	at Tennessee Titans	**L** 7–47	1–12	LP Field	Recap
15	December 20	Houston Texans	**L** 13–16	1–13	Edward Jones Dome	Recap
16	December 27	at **Arizona Cardinals**	**L** 10–31	1–14	University of Phoenix Stadium	Recap
17	January 3, 2010	**San Francisco 49ers**	**L** 6–28	1–15	Edward Jones Dome	Recap

Note: Intra-division opponents are in bold text.

== Standings ==
NFC West
	W	L	T	PCT	DIV	CONF	PF	PA	STK
^{(4)} Arizona Cardinals	10	6	0	.625	4–2	8–4	375	325	L1
San Francisco 49ers	8	8	0	.500	5–1	7–5	330	281	W2
Seattle Seahawks	5	11	0	.313	3–3	4–8	280	390	L4
St. Louis Rams	1	15	0	.063	0–6	1–11	175	436	L8

== Regular season summaries ==
=== Week 1: at Seattle Seahawks ===
Quarter	1	2	3	4	Total
Rams	0	0	0	0	0
Seahawks	0	14	14	0	28

at Qwest Field, Seattle

- Game time: 4:15 pm EDT
- Game weather: 73 °F or 22.8 °C (Sunny)
- Game attendance: 67,610
- Referee: Pete Morelli
- TV announcers (Fox): Ron Pitts, John Lynch, and Rob Desir

The Rams began their season at Qwest Field with a Week 1 divisional duel with their NFC West rival, the Seattle Seahawks. After a scoreless first quarter, St. Louis trailed in the second quarter as Seahawks quarterback Matt Hasselbeck completed a 1-yard touchdown pass to tight end John Carlson. The Rams appeared to have a game-tying touchdown after blocking a Seattle field goal by Seahawks kicker Olindo Mare late in the quarter. However, it was overturned because there were twelve Rams’ players on the field, leading to a Seahawks 12-yard touchdown pass to wide receiver Nate Burleson. In the third quarter, Seattle continued its dominance with Hasselbeck completing a 33-yard touchdown pass to Carlson, along with running back Julius Jones getting a 62-yard touchdown run. From there on out, the Seahawks’ defense helped secure a shutout win.

With this loss, the Rams began their season at 0–1.

=== Week 2: at Washington Redskins ===
Quarter	1	2	3	4	Total
Rams	0	7	0	0	7
Redskins	3	3	3	0	9

at FedEx Field, Landover, Maryland

- Game time: 1:00 pm EDT
- Game weather: 72 °F or 22.2 °C (Sunny)
- Game attendance: 87,780
- Referee: Jerome Boger
- TV announcers (Fox): Sam Rosen and Tim Ryan

Hoping to rebound from their shutout loss to the Seahawks, the Rams flew to FedEx Field for a Week 2 duel with the Washington Redskins. St. Louis trailed early as Redskins kicker Shaun Suisham got a 21-yard field goal. In the second quarter, the Rams’ deficit increased a Suisham made a 28-yard field goal. Afterwards, St. Louis took the lead as quarterback Marc Bulger completed a 2-yard touchdown pass to wide receiver Laurent Robinson. However, Washington got their lead again as Suisham nailed a 23-yard field goal. From there on out, the Rams were unable to obtain further points.

With this loss, St. Louis fell to 0–2.

=== Week 3: vs. Green Bay Packers ===
Quarter	1	2	3	4	Total
Packers	9	14	0	13	36
Rams	0	14	3	0	17

at Edward Jones Dome, St. Louis, Missouri

- Game time: 1:00 p.m. EDT/12:00 p.m. CDT
- Game weather: None (Domed Stadium)
- Game attendance: 60,234
- Referee: Walt Coleman
- TV announcers (Fox): Chris Myers and Trent Green

Still searching for their first win of the season, the Rams played their Week 3 home opener against the Green Bay Packers. St. Louis immediately trailed early in the first quarter as Packers kicker Mason Crosby got a 48, a 38, and a 25-yard field goal. Green Bay would increase their lead in the second quarter as fullback John Kuhn got a 1-yard touchdown run. The Rams would respond with the arm of quarterback Kyle Boller, as he hooked up with tight end Daniel Fells on a 16-yard touchdown pass. However, the Packers would strike back with quarterback Aaron Rodgers's 21-yard touchdown pass to wide receiver Donald Driver. St. Louis would close out the half with Boller and Fells hooking up with each other again on a 19-yard touchdown pass.

The Rams would inch closer in the third quarter with kicker Josh Brown's 53-yard field goal. However, Green Bay would pull away in the fourth quarter as Rodgers got a 4-yard touchdown run (with a failed PAT) and completed a 10-yard touchdown pass to Kuhn.

With this loss, St. Louis fell to 0–3.

Starting quarterback Marc Bulger (3-of-4, 23 yards) left the game in the second quarter with an injury to his right shoulder.

=== Week 4: at San Francisco 49ers ===
Quarter	1	2	3	4	Total
Rams	0	0	0	0	0
49ers	0	7	14	14	35

at Candlestick Park, San Francisco

- Game time: 4:15 pm EDT
- Game weather: 60 °F or 15.6 °C (Sunny)
- Game attendance: 69,732
- Referee: Tony Corrente
- TV announcers (Fox): Ron Pitts, John Lynch, and Nischelle Turner

Following their home loss to the Packers, the Rams flew to Candlestick Park for a Week 4 NFC West duel with their hated rival, the San Francisco 49ers. Due to an injury to Marc Bulger, quarterback Kyle Boller got the start.

After a scoreless first quarter, St. Louis’ seasonal struggles continued on the 49ers’ second punt of the game. The ball would hit backup cornerback Quincy Butler's foot and roll into the endzone where backup Niners linebacker Scott McKillop would land on it for a touchdown. San Francisco would continue its dominating run in the third quarter with quarterback Shaun Hill hooking up on a 13-yard touchdown pass to tight end Vernon Davis, followed by linebacker Patrick Willis returning an interception 23 yards for a touchdown. The 49ers would wrap up their victory march in the fourth quarter with Hill finding wide receiver Josh Morgan on a 24-yard touchdown pass, followed by defensive tackle Ray McDonald returning a fumble 11 yards for a touchdown.

With their second shutout loss of the season, the Rams fell to 0–4.

=== Week 5: vs. Minnesota Vikings ===
Quarter	1	2	3	4	Total
Vikings	14	3	7	14	38
Rams	0	3	0	7	10

at Edward Jones Dome, St. Louis

- Game time: 1:00 pm EDT
- Game weather: None (Domed Stadium)
- Game attendance: 60,166
- Referee: Don Carey
- TV announcers (Fox): Chris Myers and Charles Davis

Hoping to get their first win of the season, the Rams went home, donned their throwback uniforms, and prepared for a Week 5 duel with the Minnesota Vikings. Even though quarterback Marc Bulger was almost back to 100% health, backup quarterback Kyle Boller got the start.

In the first quarter, St. Louis continued to struggle as Vikings running back Adrian Peterson got a 5-yard touchdown run and defensive end Jared Allen returned a fumble 52 yards for a touchdown. The Rams would get on the board in the second quarter with a 29-yard field goal from kicker Josh Brown, but Minnesota came right back with kicking Ryan Longwell nailing a 47-yard field goal.

The Vikings would continue to make their presence felt in the third quarter with quarterback Brett Favre completing a 13-yard touchdown to tight end Visanthe Shiancoe. Minnesota would follow it up in the fourth quarter with Peterson's 7-yard touchdown. St. Louis tried to rally as quarterback Marc Bulger completed a 27-yard touchdown pass to wide receiver Donnie Avery, but the Vikings would close out the game with running back Chester Taylor's 1-yard touchdown run.

With this loss, the Rams fell to 0–5.

=== Week 6: at Jacksonville Jaguars ===
Quarter	1	2	3	4	OT	Total
Rams	7	3	0	10	0	20
Jaguars	6	0	0	14	3	23

at Jacksonville Municipal Stadium, Jacksonville, Florida

- Game time: 1:00 pm EDT
- Game weather: 57 °F or 13.9 °C (Sunny)
- Game attendance: 42,088
- Referee: Jeff Triplette
- TV announcers (Fox): Ron Pitts and John Lynch

Still on the hunt for their first win of the season, the Rams flew to Jacksonville Municipal Stadium for a Week 6 interconference duel with the Jacksonville Jaguars. St. Louis got the opening charge in the first quarter with quarterback Marc Bulger's 17-yard touchdown pass to wide receiver Donnie Avery. The Jaguars would answer with running back Maurice Jones-Drew getting a 4-yard touchdown run (with a failed PAT). Afterwards, the Rams would get the only points of the second quarter as kicker Josh Brown nailed a 52-yard field goal.

After a scoreless third quarter, a back-and-forth quarter would ensue. Jones-Drew would help Jacksonville take the lead with a 1-yard touchdown run, yet Rams defensive end Leonard Little would return an interception 36 yards for a touchdown. Following a 3-yard touchdown run by Jones-Drew, St. Louis would tie the game with Brown's 27-yard field goal. However, in overtime, the Jaguars got the last laugh as kicker Josh Scobee booted the game-winning 36-yard field goal.

With this loss, the Rams fell to 0–6.

=== Week 7: vs. Indianapolis Colts ===
Quarter	1	2	3	4	Total
Colts	14	7	7	14	42
Rams	3	0	3	0	6

at Edward Jones Dome, St. Louis

- Game time: 1:00 pm EDT
- Game weather: None (Domed Stadium)
- Game attendance: 60,108
- Referee: Carl Cheffers
- TV announcers (CBS): Kevin Harlan and Solomon Wilcots

Still trying to get their first win of the season, the Rams went home for a Week 7 interconference duel with the Indianapolis Colts. St. Louis would trail early in the first quarter as Colts quarterback Peyton Manning completed a 6-yard touchdown pass to wide receiver Reggie Wayne. The Rams would answer with a 30-yard field goal from kicker Josh Brown, but Indianapolis answered with Manning's 27-yard touchdown pass to tight end Dallas Clark. Afterwards, the Colts would get the only score of the second quarter with running back Joseph Addai's 6-yard touchdown run.

St. Louis would begin the third quarter with Brown booting a 45-yard field goal, yet Indianapolis continued their domination as cornerback Jacob Lacey return an interception 35 yards for a touchdown. In the fourth quarter, the Colts closed out the game with Manning's 8-yard touchdown pass to wide receiver Austin Collie and running back Chad Simpson's 35-yard touchdown run.

With this loss, the Rams fell to 0–7.

=== Week 8: at Detroit Lions ===
Quarter	1	2	3	4	Total
Rams	3	7	0	7	17
Lions	0	2	0	8	10

at Ford Field, Detroit

- Game time: 1:00 pm EST
- Game weather: None (Domed Stadium)
- Game attendance: 40,857
- Referee: Ron Winter
- TV announcers (Fox): Ron Pitts and John Lynch

Still in the hunt for their first win of the season, the Rams flew to Ford Field for a Week 8 duel with the Detroit Lions. St. Louis got the game's first points in the opening quarter as kicker Josh Brown booted a 41-yard field goal. In the second quarter, the Lions got on the board due to a Rams miscue. Safety James Butler got an interception in his endzone. He would then run out and then back in, where he would be tackled by Detroit running back Kevin Smith for a safety. Afterwards, St. Louis would close out the half with a trick play. On a fake field goal attempt, Brown would complete a 36-yard touchdown pass to tight end Daniel Fells.

After a scoreless third quarter, the Lions began to rally in the fourth quarter as quarterback Matthew Stafford got a 4-yard touchdown and completed a 2-point conversion pass to running back Maurice Morris. The Rams prevailed as running back Steven Jackson got a 25-yard touchdown run.

With this win, St. Louis snapped a seventeen-game losing streak – their previous win having been against the Dallas Cowboys in Week 7 of the 2008 season – and provided the first win for rookie head coach Steve Spagnuolo before the Rams entered their bye week at 1–7.

=== Week 10: vs. New Orleans Saints ===
Quarter	1	2	3	4	Total
Saints	0	14	7	7	28
Rams	0	14	3	6	23

at Edward Jones Dome, St. Louis

- Game time: 1:00 pm EST
- Game weather: None (domed stadium)
- Game attendance: 59,858
- Referee: Gene Steratore
- TV announcers (Fox): Chris Rose, Trent Green and Rob Desir

Coming off their bye week, the Rams went home for a Week 10 duel with the undefeated New Orleans Saints. After a scoreless first quarter, Saints running back Reggie Bush got a 3-yard touchdown run to open the scoring, but the Rams would answer when quarterback Marc Bulger found wide receiver Donnie Avery on a 29-yard touchdown pass. Although New Orleans retook the lead with quarterback Drew Brees’ 15-yard touchdown pass to Bush, St. Louis would close out the half with running back Steven Jackson's 2-yard touchdown run.

The Saints would deliver a huge strike in the third quarter as wide receiver Courtney Roby returned the second half's opening kickoff 97 yards for a touchdown, yet the Rams would keep it close with kicker Josh Brown's 32-yard field goal. In the fourth quarter, New Orleans would increase their lead with Brees’ 27-yard touchdown pass to wide receiver Robert Meachem. St. Louis tried to rally as Bulger completed a 19-yard touchdown pass to Avery (with a failed 2-point conversion), but the Saints’ defense would prevent any further progress.

=== Week 11: vs. Arizona Cardinals ===
Quarter	1	2	3	4	Total
Cardinals	7	14	0	0	21
Rams	3	0	3	7	13

at Edward Jones Dome, St. Louis, Missouri

- Game time: 4:05 pm EST
- Game weather: None (domed stadium)
- Game attendance: 59,839
- Referee: Bill Leavy
- TV announcers (Fox): Ron Pitts and John Lynch

Hoping to rebound from their loss to the Saints, the Rams went home for an NFC West rivalry match against the Arizona Cardinals.

In the first quarter, St. Louis got on the board first with kicker Josh Brown getting a 40-yard field goal. The Rams fell behind with QB Kurt Warner making a 5-yard touchdown pass to WR Anquan Boldin and then to WR Larry Fitzgerald on an 11-yard touchdown pass in the second quarter. The Cardinals lead extended as rookie RB Beanie Wells made a 1-yard touchdown run to end the half.

The Rams replied in the third quarter with kicker Josh Brown making a 20-yard field goal. The Rams tried hard to come back into the game in the fourth quarter with RB Steven Jackson running 1 yard to the end zone for a touchdown, but the Cardinals’ defense prevented the case, giving the Rams another loss.

=== Week 12: vs. Seattle Seahawks ===
Quarter	1	2	3	4	Total
Seahawks	7	7	3	10	27
Rams	0	10	0	7	17

at Edward Jones Dome, St. Louis, Missouri

- Game time: 1:00 pm EST
- Game weather: None (domed stadium)
- Game attendance: 47,475
- Referee: Scott Green
- TV announcers (Fox): Ron Pitts, John Lynch and Nischelle Turner

With the loss, the Rams were officially eliminated from playoff contention for the fifth consecutive season.

=== Week 13: at Chicago Bears ===
Quarter	1	2	3	4	Total
Rams	0	3	3	3	9
Bears	10	0	7	0	17

at Soldier Field, Chicago

- Game time: 1:00 pm EST
- Game weather: 36 °F or 2.2 °C (Sunny to Partly Cloudy)
- Game attendance: 61,892
- Referee: Pete Morelli
- TV announcers (Fox): Dick Stockton and Trent Green

=== Week 14: at Tennessee Titans ===
Quarter	1	2	3	4	Total
Rams	0	0	0	7	7
Titans	14	9	10	14	47

at LP Field, Nashville, Tennessee

- Game time: 4:05 pm EST
- Game weather: 53 °F or 11.7 °C (Cloudy)
- Game attendance: 69,143
- Referee: Jeff Triplette
- TV announcers (Fox): Chris Rose and Trent Green

=== Week 15: vs. Houston Texans ===
Quarter	1	2	3	4	Total
Texans	3	3	7	3	16
Rams	0	10	3	0	13

at Edward Jones Dome, St. Louis, Missouri

- Game time: 1:00 pm EST
- Game weather: None (Dome Stadium)
- Game attendance: 46,256
- Referee: Ed Hochuli
- TV announcers (CBS): Kevin Harlan and Solomon Wilcots

=== Week 16: at Arizona Cardinals ===
Quarter	1	2	3	4	Total
Rams	0	0	7	3	10
Cardinals	0	17	7	7	31

at University of Phoenix Stadium, Glendale, Arizona

- Game time: 4:05 pm EST
- Game weather: Sunny, 65 °F (18.3 °C)
- Game attendance: 62,624
- Referee: Alberto Riveron
- TV announcers (Fox): Sam Rosen and Tim Ryan

=== Week 17: vs. San Francisco 49ers ===
Quarter	1	2	3	4	Total
49ers	0	0	7	21	28
Rams	0	3	0	3	6

at Edward Jones Dome, St. Louis

- Game time: 1:00 pm EST
- Game weather: None (domed stadium)
- Game attendance: 47,965
- Referee: Mike Carey
- TV announcers (Fox): Matt Vasgersian and Ross Tucker

With the loss, the Rams ended the season with a franchise worst 1–15 record, clinching the #1 pick in 2010 NFL draft.

They became the ninth team to finish a season with a 1–15 record, following the 2007 Dolphins. They would later on be joined by the 2016 Cleveland Browns and the 2020 Jacksonville Jaguars

== Local television blackouts ==
In the 2009 season, the Rams had three regular season games blacked out on local television. After selling out their first five games, attendance began to drop and the Rams couldn't sell out their final three games against the Seahawks, Texans, and 49ers. In all of these instances, the Rams fell well short of a sellout and did not even ask for a deadline extension from the NFL to try to sell remaining tickets and avert a blackout. Since 2007, the Rams had only won two games at the Edward Jones Dome.
