= 2008 St. Louis Rams season =

NFL team season

- Owner: Chip Rosenbloom and Lucia Rodriguez
- Head coach: Scott Linehan (fired September 29, 0–4 record); Jim Haslett (interim, 2–10 record)
- Home stadium: Edward Jones Dome

Results
- Record: 2–14
- Division place: 4th NFC West
- Playoffs: Did not qualify
- Pro Bowlers: none
- Team MVP: Oshiomogho Atogwe
- Team ROY: Donnie Avery

The 2008 season was the St. Louis Rams' 71st in the National Football League (NFL) and their 14th in St. Louis. They failed to improve upon their 3–13 record from the previous season and dropped to a dismal 2–14 record.

On September 29, 2008, following a 0–4 start, head coach Scott Linehan was fired and replaced by defensive coordinator Jim Haslett, who occupied the head coach position with the team for the remainder of the 2008 season.

This was the first time the Rams suffered from consecutive losing seasons since 1997 and 1998.

== Off season ==
After having been hospitalized for several months with breast cancer, owner Georgia Frontiere died on January 18, 2008. Frontiere's son and Rams owner Chip Rosenbloom wanted to have the team wear its old blue and yellow uniforms from the 1999 season, but was denied his request by the NFL stating that he needed to give a one-year notice. Rosenbloom announced on April 24, 2008, that the Rams will have a patch on the left shoulder of the jersey with the word "Georgia" written the way Frontiere signed her name during the 2008 season.

=== Free agency ===
On March 1, the first day of free agency, the Rams signed place kicker Josh Brown from the Seattle Seahawks to a five-year, $14.2 million contract to replace retired Jeff Wilkins. On March 3, the Rams signed Offensive Lineman Jacob Bell as a free agent from the Tennessee Titans to a six-year, $36 million deal, and includes a $7 million signing bonus. On March 6, the Rams signed Tight End Anthony Becht as a free agent from the Tampa Bay Buccaneers for an undisclosed amount.

=== NFL draft ===
Round	Pick	Player	Position	College
1	2	Chris Long	DE	Virginia
2	33	Donnie Avery	WR	Houston
3	65	John Greco	OT	Toledo
4	101	Justin King	CB	Penn State
4	128	Keenan Burton	WR	Kentucky
5	157	Roy Schuening	OG	Oregon State
7	228	Chris Chamberlain	LB	Tulsa
7	252	David Vobora	LB	Idaho

Prior to the draft, Billy Devaney was named vice president of player personnel, and took over decisions in for the off season and draft. The Denver Broncos traded their sixth-round selection (180th overall) to the Rams for defensive tackle Jimmy Kennedy. The Rams traded their seventh-round selection (209th overall) to the Minnesota Vikings for offensive tackle Adam Goldberg. The Rams received the Cincinnati Bengals' seventh-round pick (217th overall) in exchange for Ryan Fitzpatrick. The Rams received one seventh-round pick (252nd overall) as a compensatory selection.

During Draft Day, the Washington Redskins traded their fifth-round and seventh-round selections (#157 and #228 overall) to the Rams for its two sixth-round selections (#168 and #180 overall).

=== Training camp ===
Steven Jackson held out of camp because he believed he was underpaid, and there was only one year left on his rookie contract. He later ended his holdout and said that he would report to camp. Jackson ended his holdout officially, after he signed a six-year contract worth a maximum of $49.3 million, including $21 million in guarantees. The final two years of the deal can be voided upon performance so it can be a three-year extension worth $29.3 million. At the time, this made him the highest paid running back in the NFL.

== Personnel ==
St. Louis Rams 2008 final roster
Quarterbacks: 13 Brock Berlin; 10 Marc Bulger; 12 Trent Green; Running backs: 33 Kenneth Darby KR; 39 Steven Jackson; 22 Travis Minor KR; 30 Antonio Pittman; Wide receivers: 17 Donnie Avery; 14 Keenan Burton; 81 Torry Holt; 89 Dane Looker PR; Tight ends: 87 Anthony Becht; 46 Daniel Fells; 88 Joe Klopfenstein	Offensive linemen: 70 Alex Barron T; 63 Jacob Bell G; 69 Anthony Davis T; 73 Adam Goldberg G/T; 79 John Greco G/T; 68 Richie Incognito G; 76 Orlando Pace T; 65 Brett Romberg C; 67 Roy Schuening G; 61 Cory Withrow C; Defensive linemen: 94 Victor Adeyanju DE; 99 Antwon Burton DT; 90 Adam Carriker DT; 97 La'Roi Glover DT; 96 James Hall DE; 91 Leonard Little DE; 72 Chris Long DE; 92 Eric Moore DE; 95 Clifton Ryan DT	Linebackers: 57 Chris Chamberlain OLB; 53 Quinton Culberson OLB; 52 Chris Draft MLB/OLB; 59 Larry Grant OLB; 50 Pisa Tinoisamoa OLB; 58 David Vobora MLB; 51 Will Witherspoon MLB; Defensive backs: 21 Oshiomogho Atogwe FS; 24 Ron Bartell CB; 41 Eric Bassey FS; 34 Fakhir Brown CB; 36 Quincy Butler CB; 25 Corey Chavous SS; 31 Jason Craft CB; 35 Todd Johnson SS; 42 David Roach FS; 20 Jonathan Wade CB; Special teams: 3 Josh Brown K; 5 Donnie Jones P; 45 Chris Massey LS	Reserve lists: 83 Drew Bennett WR (IR); 77 Brandon Gorin T (IR); 82 Dante Hall WR/KR/PR (IR); 26 Tye Hill CB (IR); 32 Justin King CB (IR); 60 Nick Leckey C (IR); 23 Brian Leonard FB (IR); 27 Ricky Manning CB (IR); 84 Randy McMichael TE (IR); 71 Rob Petitti T (IR); 66 Mark Setterstrom G (IR); 19 Derek Stanley WR/KR/PR (IR); 55 Gary Stills LB (IR); -- Claude Wroten DT (Susp.); Practice squad: 98 C. J. Ah You DE; 16 Travis Brown WR; 11 Matt Caddell WR; 15 Joel Filani WR; 18 Nate Jones WR; 71 Clint Oldenburg T; 93 Willie Williams DT; rookies in italics 53 active, 14 inactive, 7 practice squad

== Preseason schedule ==
Week	Date	Opponent	Result	Record	Venue	NFL.com recap
1	August 9	at Tennessee Titans	L 13–34	0–1	LP Field	Recap
2	August 16	San Diego Chargers	W 7–6	1–1	Edward Jones Dome	Recap
3	August 23	Baltimore Ravens	W 24–10	2–1	Edward Jones Dome	Recap
4	August 28	at Kansas City Chiefs	L 16–21	2–2	Arrowhead Stadium	Recap

== Schedule ==
Week	Date	Opponent	Result	Record	Venue	NFL.com recap
1	September 7	at Philadelphia Eagles	**L** 3–38	0–1	Lincoln Financial Field	Recap
2	September 14	New York Giants	**L** 13–41	0–2	Edward Jones Dome	Recap
3	September 21	at **Seattle Seahawks**	**L** 13–37	0–3	Qwest Field	Recap
4	September 28	Buffalo Bills	**L** 14–31	0–4	Edward Jones Dome	Recap
5	Bye					
6	October 12	at Washington Redskins	**W** 19–17	1–4	FedExField	Recap
7	October 19	Dallas Cowboys	**W** 34–14	2–4	Edward Jones Dome	Recap
8	October 26	at New England Patriots	**L** 16–23	2–5	Gillette Stadium	Recap
9	November 2	**Arizona Cardinals**	**L** 13–34	2–6	Edward Jones Dome	Recap
10	November 9	at New York Jets	**L** 3–47	2–7	Giants Stadium	Recap
11	November 16	at **San Francisco 49ers**	**L** 16–35	2–8	Candlestick Park	Recap
12	November 23	Chicago Bears	**L** 3–27	2–9	Edward Jones Dome	Recap
13	November 30	Miami Dolphins	**L** 12–16	2–10	Edward Jones Dome	Recap
14	December 7	at **Arizona Cardinals**	**L** 10–34	2–11	University of Phoenix Stadium	Recap
15	December 14	**Seattle Seahawks**	**L** 20–23	2–12	Edward Jones Dome	Recap
16	December 21	**San Francisco 49ers**	**L** 16–17	2–13	Edward Jones Dome	Recap
17	December 28	at Atlanta Falcons	**L** 27–31	2–14	Georgia Dome	Recap
Note: Intra-division opponents are in **bold** text.

== Standings ==
NFC West
	W	L	T	PCT	DIV	CONF	PF	PA	STK
^{(4)} Arizona Cardinals	9	7	0	.563	6–0	7–5	427	426	W1
San Francisco 49ers	7	9	0	.438	3–3	5–7	339	381	W2
Seattle Seahawks	4	12	0	.250	3–3	3–9	294	392	L1
St. Louis Rams	2	14	0	.125	0–6	2–10	232	465	L10

== Regular season week-by-week results ==
=== Week 1: at Philadelphia Eagles ===
Quarter	1	2	3	4	Total
Rams	0	0	0	3	3
Eagles	14	7	10	7	38

at Lincoln Financial Field, Philadelphia, Pennsylvania

- Game time: 1:02 pm EDT
- Game weather: 80 °F or 26.7 °C
- Game attendance: 69,144
- Referee: Peter Morelli
- TV announcers (Fox): Kenny Albert, Daryl Johnston, & Tony Siragusa

The Eagles raced out of the gates to dismantle the Rams 38–3, the Eagles’ largest opening week margin-of-victory ever. Rookie DeSean Jackson pulled down a 47-yard reception on the second play over Tye Hill, and the drive finished with a shovel pass touchdown to Brian Westbrook. Donovan McNabb marched the Eagles down the field again on their second possession, finding L.J. Smith in the back of the end zone to make it 14–0. During the drive, Hill was beat again, this time by Greg Lewis on a double move and was benched for the game. Late in the second quarter, receiver Hank Baskett beat the coverage and scored on a 90-yard reception. Fullback Tony Hunt scored from a yard out in the third quarter and the rout was on. DeSean Jackson's 60-yard punt return set up a short field goal for David Akers, and Philadelphia's lead grew to 31–0. Westbrook added a 6-yard rushing touchdown early in the fourth quarter before Josh Brown kicked a 46-yard field goal to avoid the shutout.

McNabb had a vintage performance, throwing for 361 yards (mostly in the first half) and three scores. Jackson, Greg Lewis, and Baskett each had over 100 yards receiving. Westbrook ran for 91 yards and two touchdowns, while the defense completely shut down the St. Louis offense. The Rams didn't convert on all 11 3rd down plays, the first time since 1991. Steven Jackson had 40 yards on 14 carries and the team averaged 2.4 yards rushing.

In addition to beginning the season 0–1, the Rams suffered injuries with Leonard Little leaving the game with a hamstring injury, Drew Bennett with a foot injury and Orlando Pace with bruised ribs.

=== Week 2: vs. New York Giants ===
Quarter	1	2	3	4	Total
Giants	7	6	7	21	41
Rams	0	6	0	7	13

at Edward Jones Dome, St. Louis, Missouri

- Game time: 12:00 pm CST
- Game weather: None (Domed Stadium)
- Game attendance: 61,377
- Referee: Bill Leavy
- TV announcers (Fox): Joe Buck, Troy Aikman, & Pam Oliver

Hoping to rebound from their dismal road loss to the Eagles, the Rams played their Week 2 home opener against the defending Super Bowl champions, the New York Giants. In the first quarter, St. Louis trailed early as Giants QB Eli Manning completed a 33-yard TD pass to WR Plaxico Burress. In the second quarter, the Rams responded with kicker Josh Brown getting a 54-yard field goal, yet New York answered with kicker John Carney kicking a 39-yard field goal. St. Louis would reply with Brown's 54-yard field goal, yet the Giants answered with Carney nailing a 33-yard field goal.

In the third quarter, New York increased its lead with Manning completing a 10-yard TD pass to WR Amani Toomer. In the fourth quarter, the Rams tried to rally as WR Torry Holt made a 45-yard juggling, circus catch in the end zone from QB Marc Bulger, making the Rams down 20–13 with 10 minutes 46 seconds left to play. However, the Giants pulled away with Manning's 18-yard TD pass to RB Ahmad Bradshaw, DE Justin Tuck’s 41-yard interception return for a touchdown, and Bradshaw's 31-yard TD run.

With the loss, St. Louis fell to 0–2. Over the course of two games the defense gave up almost 1,000 yards. The Rams offense has yet to be in the red zone all season.

=== Week 3: at Seattle Seahawks ===
Quarter	1	2	3	4	Total
Rams	0	6	7	0	13
Seahawks	17	10	0	10	37

at Qwest Field, Seattle, Washington

- Game time: 4:05 pm EDT
- Game weather: 59 °F or 15 °C (Cloudy)
- Game attendance: 68,012
- Referee: Gene Steratore
- TV announcers (Fox): Matt Vasgersian, J.C. Pearson, & Nischelle Turner

Trying to snap a two-game skid, the Rams flew to Qwest Field for a Week 3 NFC West duel with the Seattle Seahawks. In the first quarter, St. Louis trailed early as Seahawks kicker Olindo Mare got a 28-yard field goal, QB Matt Hasselbeck completing a 10-yard TD pass to WR Michael Bumpus, and RB Julius Jones getting a 29-yard TD run. In the second quarter, the Rams got on the board as former Seahawk kicker Josh Brown got a 43-yard field goal, yet Seattle responded with RB T.J. Duckett getting a 4-yard TD run. St. Louis would answer with Brown kicking a 29-yard field goal, yet the Seahawks increased its lead with Mare kicking a 38-yard field goal.

In the third quarter, the Rams tried to rally as QB Marc Bulger completed a 21-yard TD pass to WR Dane Looker. However, in the fourth quarter, Seattle pulled away with Duckett's 1-yard TD run and Mare's 38-yard field goal.

With the loss, St. Louis fell to 0–3.

=== Week 4: vs. Buffalo Bills ===
Quarter	1	2	3	4	Total
Bills	6	0	7	18	31
Rams	7	7	0	0	14

at Edward Jones Dome, St. Louis, Missouri

- Game time: 4:05 pm EDT
- Game weather: None (Domed Stadium)
- Game attendance: 61,017
- Referee: Tony Corrente
- TV announcers (CBS): Ian Eagle & Solomon Wilcots

Still searching for their first win, the Rams went home for a Week 4 interconference duel with the Buffalo Bills. Hoping to find consistency, QB Marc Bulger was benched in favor of Trent Green.

In the first quarter, St. Louis trailed early as Bills kicker Rian Lindell got a 45-yard field goal. The Rams would respond with rookie WR Donnie Avery getting a 37-yard TD run. Buffalo would answer with Lindell kicking a 35-yard field goal. In the second quarter, St. Louis increased its lead with RB Steven Jackson getting a 29-yard TD run.

In the third quarter, the Bills crept closer as RB Fred Jackson got a 22-yard TD run. In the fourth quarter, Buffalo sealed the win with CB Jabari Greer returning an interception 33 yards for a touchdown, QB Trent Edwards completing a 39-yard TD pass to WR Lee Evans, and Lindell nailing a 45-yard field goal.

With the loss, the Rams went into their bye week at 0–4. Head coach Scott Linehan was fired after the loss and was replaced by Jim Haslett.

=== Week 6: at Washington Redskins ===
Quarter	1	2	3	4	Total
Rams	3	7	6	3	19
Redskins	7	0	0	10	17

at Fedex Field, Landover, Maryland

- Game time: 1:00 pm EDT
- Game weather: 72 °F or 22.2 °C (Sunny)
- Game attendance: 90,376
- Referee: Walt Coleman
- TV announcers (Fox): Kenny Albert, Daryl Johnston, & Tony Siragusa

Coming off their bye week, the Rams flew to Fedex Field for a Week 6 duel with the Washington Redskins. In the first quarter, St. Louis trailed early as Redskins RB Clinton Portis got a 3-yard TD run. The Rams would respond with kicker Josh Brown getting a 51-yard field goal. In the second quarter, St. Louis took the lead as free safety Oshiomogho Atogwe returned a fumble 75 yards for a touchdown. In the third quarter, the Rams increased their lead as Brown kicked a 25-yard and a 44-yard field goal. In the fourth quarter, Washington rallied as kicker Shaun Suisham got a 38-yard field goal and Portis got a 2-yard TD run. Fortunately, St. Louis was able to prevail as Brown nailed the game-winning 49-yard field goal as time expired.

With the upset win, the Rams improved to 1–4.

=== Week 7: vs. Dallas Cowboys ===
Quarter	1	2	3	4	Total
Cowboys	7	0	0	7	14
Rams	21	3	7	3	34

at Edward Jones Dome, St. Louis, Missouri

- Game time: 1:00 p.m. EDT/12:00 p.m. CDT
- Game weather: None (Domed Stadium)
- Game attendance: 62,035
- Referee: John Parry
- TV announcers (Fox): Kenny Albert, Daryl Johnston, & Tony Siragusa

Hoping to build on their last-second road win over the Redskins, the Rams went home for a Week 7 duel with the Dallas Cowboys. In the first quarter, St. Louis trailed early as Cowboys RB Marion Barber got a 1-yard TD run. Afterwards, the Rams offense exploded with points as QB Marc Bulger completed a 42-yard TD pass to rookie WR Donnie Avery, along with RB Steven Jackson getting an 8-yard and a 1-yard TD run. In the second quarter, St. Louis added onto their lead as kicker Josh Brown got a 52-yard field goal.

In the third quarter, the Rams continued their victory march as Jackson got a 56-yard TD run. In the fourth quarter, St. Louis’ domination ended with Brown nailing a 35-yard field goal. Dallas ended the game's scoring with QB Brad Johnson completing a 34-yard TD pass to TE Martellus Bennett.

With their second straight win, the Rams improved to 2–4. The game also marked the first time that the Rams wore white jerseys at home, instead of their usual blue jerseys, since moving from Los Angeles in 1995, forcing the Cowboys to wear their "jinxed" navy blue jerseys.

=== Week 8: at New England Patriots ===
Quarter	1	2	3	4	Total
Rams	3	7	3	3	16
Patriots	7	6	0	10	23

at Gillette Stadium, Foxborough, Massachusetts

- Game time: 1:00 pm. EDT
- Game weather: 61 °F or 16.1 °C (Sunny)
- Game attendance: 68,756
- Referee: Scott Green
- TV announcers (Fox): Chris Rose (play-by-play), J.C. Pearson (color commentator), & Nischelle Turner (sideline reporter)

Hoping to build on their two-game win streak, the Rams flew to Gillette Stadium for a Week 8 interconference duel with the New England Patriots. In the first quarter, St. Louis struck first as kicker Josh Brown got a 20-yard field goal. The Patriots answered with RB BenJarvus Green-Ellis getting a 2-yard TD run. In the second quarter, the Rams regained the lead as QB Marc Bulger completed a 69-yard TD pass to rookie WR Donnie Avery. New England would get its lead back as kicker Stephen Gostkowski got a 30-yard and a 27-yard field goal.

In the third quarter, St. Louis tied the game as Brown made a 44-yard field goal. In the fourth quarter, the Rams regained the lead on Brown's 25-yard field goal. However, the Patriots sealed the win — Gostkowski nailing a 41-yard field goal, along with QB Matt Cassel completing a 15-yard TD pass to RB Kevin Faulk.

With the loss, St. Louis fell to 2–5.

=== Week 9: vs. Arizona Cardinals ===
Quarter	1	2	3	4	Total
Cardinals	0	24	7	3	34
Rams	7	0	0	6	13

at Edward Jones Dome, St. Louis, Missouri

- Game time: 1:00 pm EST/11:00 am MST
- Game weather: None (domed stadium)
- Game attendance: 61,303
- Referee: Jeff Triplette
- TV announcers (Fox): Thom Brennaman and Brian Billick

Hoping to rebound from their road loss to the Patriots, the Rams went home for a Week 9 NFC West duel with the Arizona Cardinals. In the first quarter, St. Louis struck first as QB Marc Bulger completed an 80-yard TD pass to WR Derek Stanley. In the second quarter, the Cardinals responded with a vengeance as safety Antrel Rolle returned an interception 40 yards for a touchdown, kicker Neil Rackers got a 36-yard field goal, RB Tim Hightower got a 30-yard TD run, and former Rams QB Kurt Warner completed a 56-yard TD pass to WR Jerheme Urban.

In the third quarter, Arizona increased its lead as Warner completed a 7-yard TD pass to WR Anquan Boldin. In the fourth quarter, the Rams tried to come back as Bulger completed a 3-yard TD pass to WR Torry Holt (with a failed 2-point conversion). However, the Cardinals flew away as Rackers nailed a 30-yard field goal.

With the loss, St. Louis fell to 2–6.

During the game, the Rams inducted former head coach Dick Vermeil (who helped the franchise win Super Bowl XXXIV) onto the Rams Ring of Honor.

=== Week 10: at New York Jets ===
Quarter	1	2	3	4	Total
Rams	0	0	3	0	3
Jets	17	23	0	7	47

at The Meadowlands, East Rutherford, New Jersey

- Game time: 1:00 pm EDT
- Game weather: 53 °F or 11.7 °C (Sunny)
- Game attendance: 78,073
- Referee: Bill Carollo
- TV announcers (Fox): Kenny Albert, Daryl Johnston, & Tony Siragusa

Trying to snap a two-game losing streak, the Rams flew to The Meadowlands for a Week 10 interconference duel with the New York Jets. In the first quarter, St. Louis trailed early as Jet RB Thomas Jones got a 13-yard TD run, kicker Jay Feely got a 22-yard field goal, and LB Calvin Pace returned a fumble 50 yards for a touchdown.

In the second quarter, the Rams’ misery continued as Jones got a 2-yard TD run, Feely got a 49-yard and a 46-yard field goal, QB Brett Favre completed a 1-yard TD pass to TE Dustin Keller, and Feely made a 55-yard field goal.

In the third quarter, St. Louis would get their only score of the game as kicker Josh Brown nailed a 37-yard field goal. In the fourth quarter, New York flew away as Jones got a 6-yard TD run.

With the loss, the Rams fell to 2–7 and snapped their seven-game winning streak against the Jets, losing to them for the first time since the 1983 season.

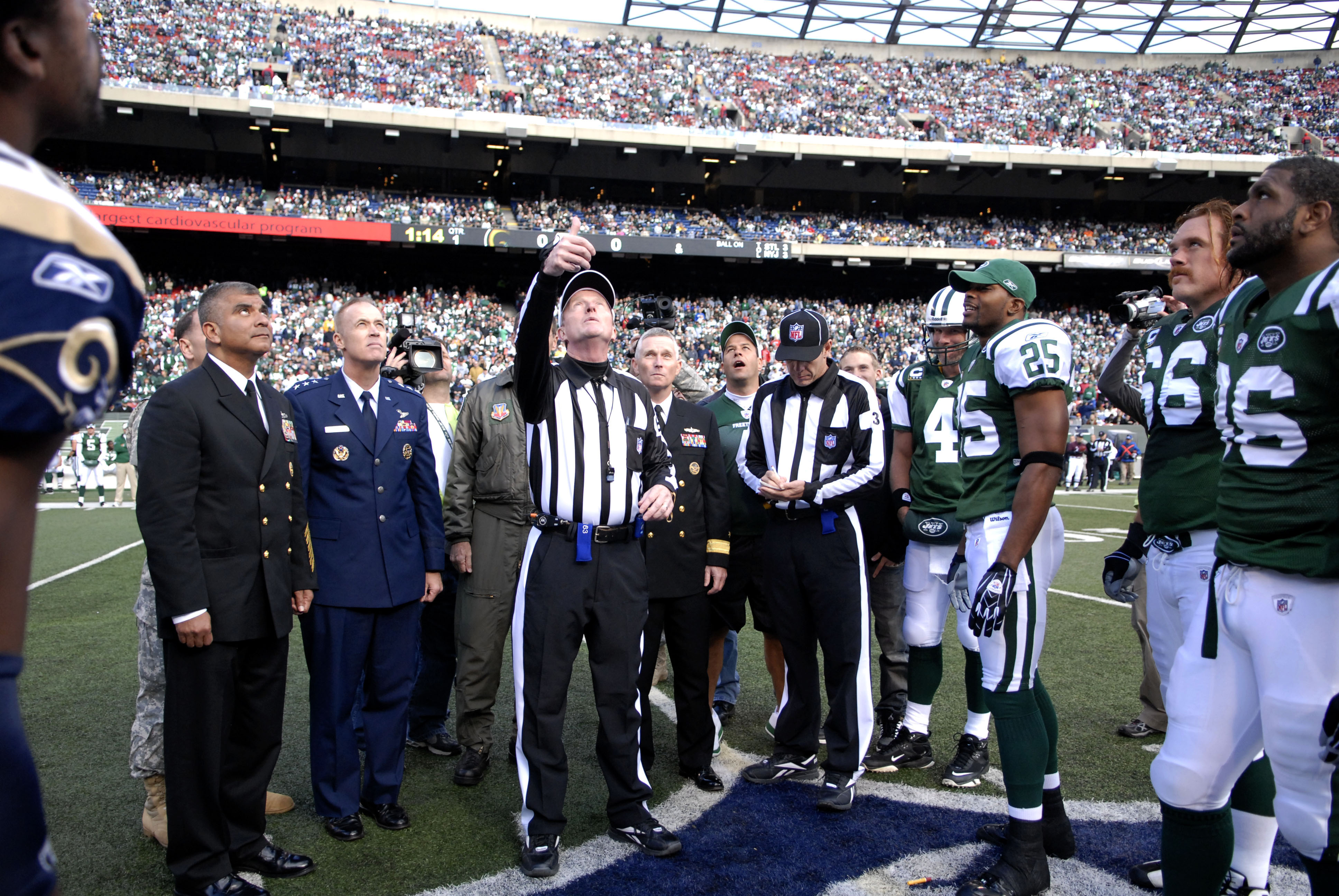
Coin toss before the Rams-Jets game

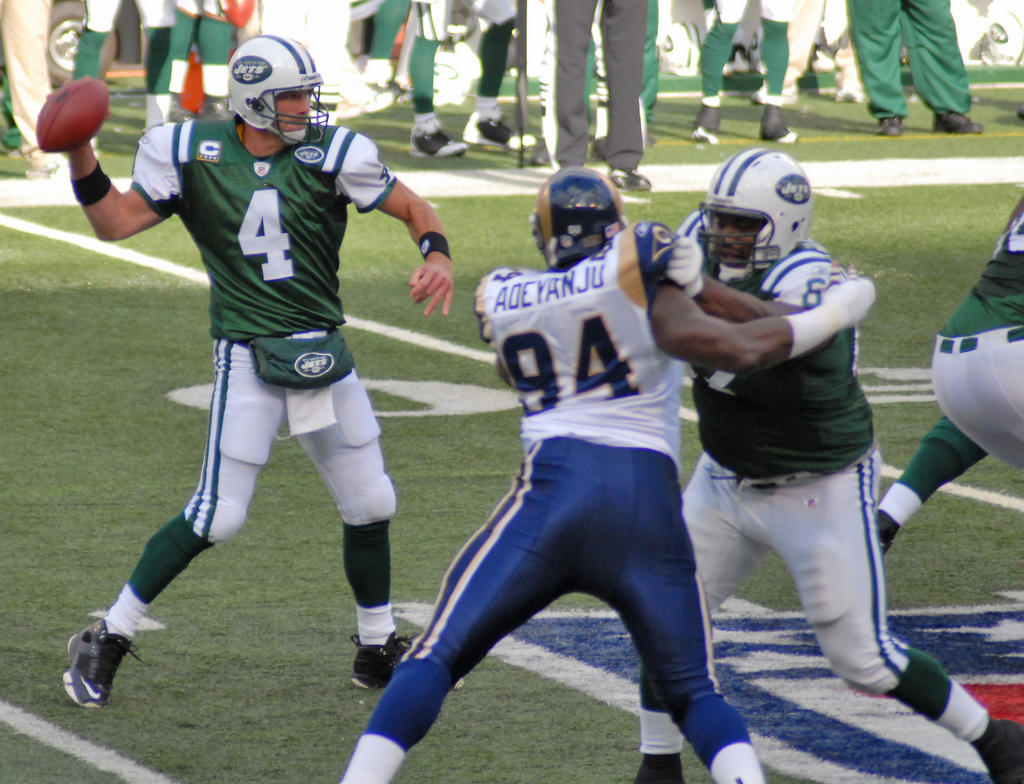
Jets QB Brett Favre passing

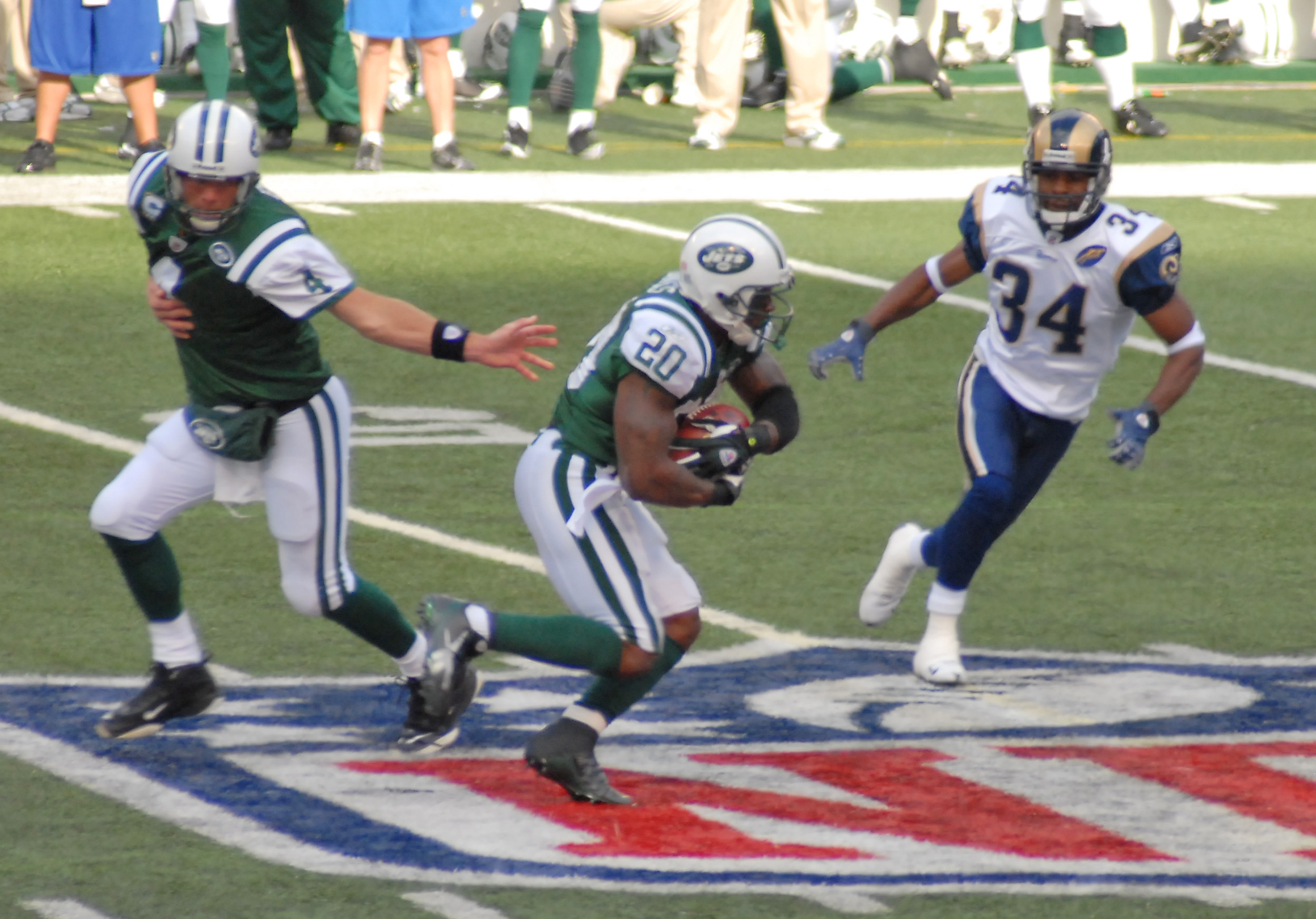
Jets handoff to Thomas Jones

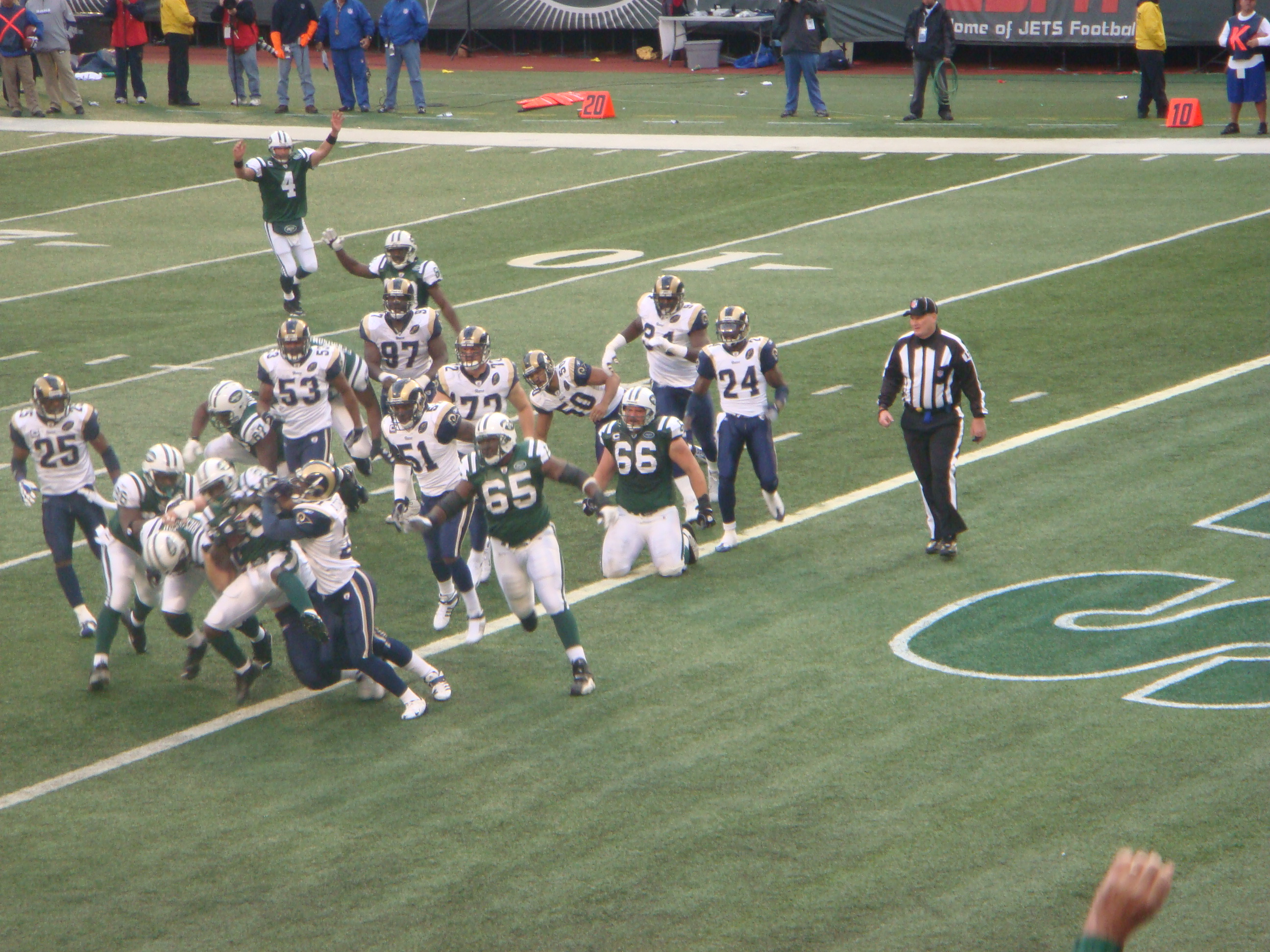
Jets TD by Jones, November 9

=== Week 11: at San Francisco 49ers ===
Quarter	1	2	3	4	Total
Rams	0	3	6	7	16
49ers	7	28	0	0	35

at Candlestick Park, San Francisco, California

- Game time: 4:05 pm EDT
- Game weather: 75 °F or 23.9 °C (Sunny)
- Game attendance: 67,573
- Referee: Alberto Riveron
- TV announcers (Fox): Matt Vasgersian, J.C. Pearson, & Nischelle Turner

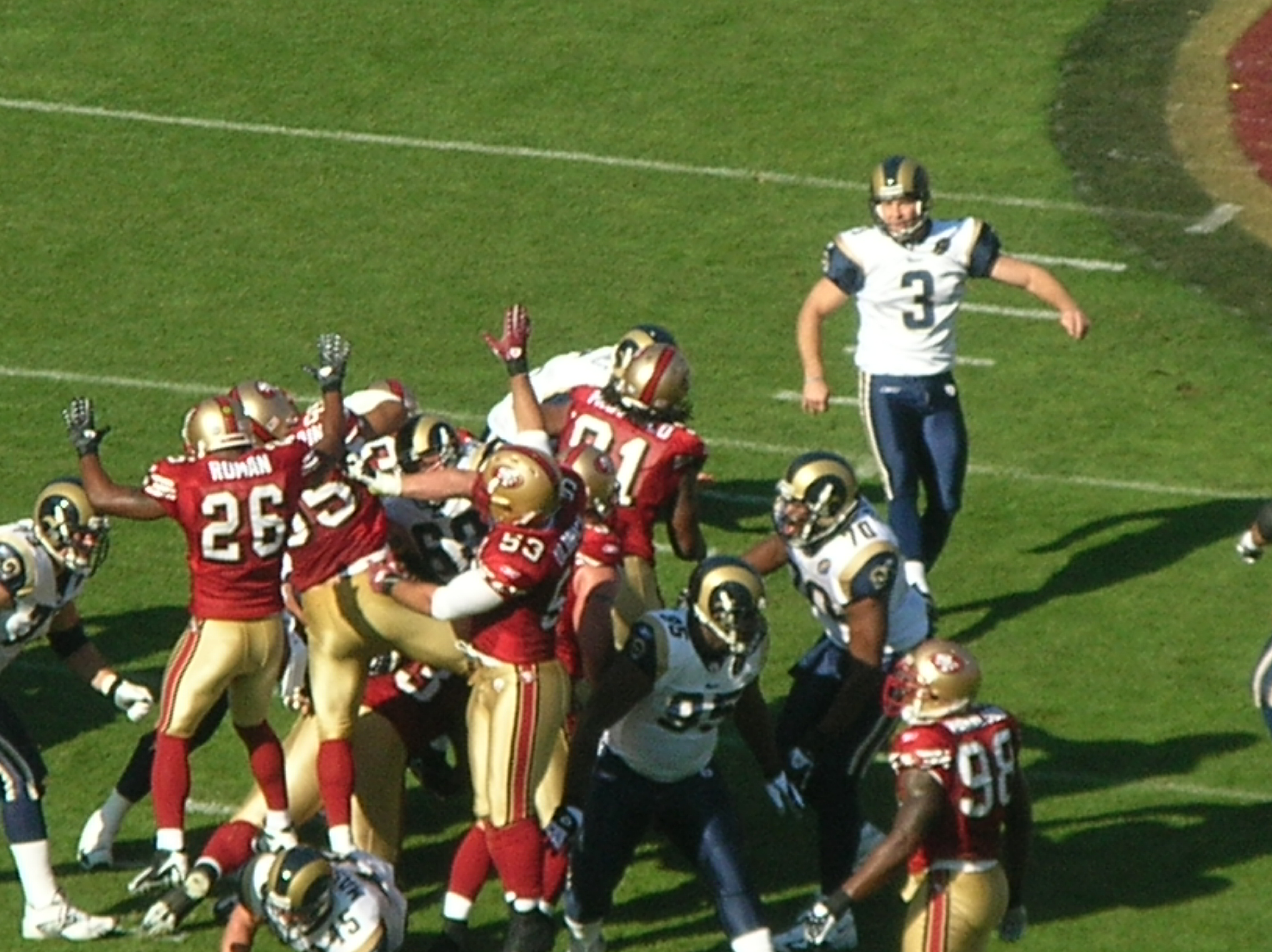
Josh Brown kicks a field goal

Trying to snap a three-game losing streak, the Rams flew to Candlestick Park for a Week 11 NFC West duel with their rival, the San Francisco 49ers. In the first quarter, St. Louis trailed early as 49ers RB Frank Gore got a 5-yard TD run. In the second quarter, the Rams responded with kicker Josh Brown getting a 24-yard field goal. However, San Francisco took a commanding lead as QB Shaun Hill completed a 2-yard TD pass to TE Vernon Davis, Gore got a 1-yard TD run, Hill got a 1-yard TD run, and Hill completed a 2-yard TD pass to WR Bryant Johnson.

In the third quarter, St. Louis hacked at their deficit as Brown nailed a 48-yard and a 44-yard field goal. In the fourth quarter, the Rams tried to complete their comeback as QB Marc Bulger completed a 2-yard TD pass to WR Dane Looker. However, the 49ers' defense was too much to overcome.

With their fourth-straight loss, St. Louis fell to 2–8.

=== Week 12: vs. Chicago Bears ===
Quarter	1	2	3	4	Total
Bears	14	10	3	0	27
Rams	0	3	0	0	3

at Edward Jones Dome, St. Louis, Missouri

- Game time: 1:00 p.m. EDT/12:00 p.m. CDT
- Game weather: None (Domed Stadium)
- Game attendance: 61,994
- Referee: Terry McAulay
- TV announcers (Fox): Dick Stockton, Brian Baldinger, & Laura Okmin

Trying to snap a four-game losing streak, the Rams went home for a Week 12 duel with the Chicago Bears. In the first quarter, St. Louis trailed early as Bears RB Matt Forte got a 13-yard TD run, while QB Kyle Orton completed a 7-yard TD pass to FB Jason McKie. In the second quarter, the Rams’ struggles continued as Forté got a 47-yard TD run. St. Louis would respond with kicker Josh Brown getting a 43-yard field goal. Chicago would close out the half with Gould making a 43-yard field goal. In the third quarter, the Bears pulled away with Gould nailing a 38-yard field goal. From there on out, Chicago's defense stiffened for the win.

With their fifth-straight loss, the Rams fell to 2–9.

=== Week 13: vs. Miami Dolphins ===
Quarter	1	2	3	4	Total
Dolphins	0	10	3	3	16
Rams	6	3	0	3	12

at Edward Jones Dome, St. Louis, Missouri

- Game time: 1:00 pm EST
- Game weather: None (Domed Stadium)
- Game attendance: 61,046
- Referee: Ron Winter
- TV announcers (CBS): Gus Johnson & Steve Tasker

Trying to snap a five-game losing streak, the Rams stayed at home for a Week 13 interconference duel with the Miami Dolphins. The Rams would welcome back Steven Jackson to the lineup after weeks of sitting out with a thigh injury. Jackson gave the Rams a good enough boost to strike first with a first possession field goal by Josh Brown from 23 yards. Brown would kick a 51-yard field goal to give the Rams a 6–0 lead. In the second quarter, the Dolphins responded as RB Ronnie Brown got a 3-yard TD run. The Rams would answer with Brown making a 33-yard field goal, but Miami replied with kicker Dan Carpenter getting a 37-yard field goal.

In the third quarter, the Dolphins increased their lead as Carpenter got a 47-yard field goal. In the fourth quarter, St. Louis tried to keep up as Brown made a 38-yard field goal, yet Miami answered right back with Carpenter nailing a 42-yard field goal. The Rams tried to come back, but a late-game interception shattered any hope of a comeback.

With their sixth-straight loss, St. Louis fell to 2–10.

=== Week 14: at Arizona Cardinals ===
Quarter	1	2	3	4	Total
Rams	0	7	0	3	10
Cardinals	14	6	7	7	34

at University of Phoenix Stadium, Glendale, Arizona

- Game time: 4:15 pm EDT
- Game weather: None (Domed Stadium)
- Game attendance: 63,720
- Referee: Walt Coleman
- TV announcers (Fox): Matt Vasgersian, J.C. Pearson, & Nischelle Turner

With the loss, the Rams fell to 2–11.

=== Week 15: vs. Seattle Seahawks ===
Quarter	1	2	3	4	Total
Seahawks	7	0	6	10	23
Rams	7	10	0	3	20

at Edward Jones Dome, St. Louis, Missouri

- Game time: 1:00 pm EDT
- Game weather: None (Domed Stadium)
- Game attendance: 56,123
- Referee: Ed Hochuli
- TV announcers (Fox): Matt Vasgersian, J.C. Pearson, & Nischelle Turner

The Rams played a solid 1st half but the Seahawks turned the tables with 10 points in the final 2:47 for a 23–20 victory Sunday. T.J. Duckett's 1-yard run tied it, the Rams fizzled while going three-and-out, and Olindo Mare's 27-yard field goal as time expired ended the Seahawks' six-game losing streak and extended the Rams’ losing streak to 8 as they fell to 2–12.

=== Week 16: vs. San Francisco 49ers ===
Quarter	1	2	3	4	Total
49ers	3	0	0	14	17
Rams	0	13	0	3	16

at Edward Jones Dome, St. Louis, Missouri

- Game time: 1:00 pm EST
- Game weather: None (Domed Stadium)
- Game attendance: 54,948
- Referee: Carl Cheffers
- TV announcers (Fox): Sam Rosen, Tim Ryan, & Chris Myers

Hoping to snap an eight-game losing streak, the Rams stayed at home for a Week 16 NFC West rematch with the San Francisco 49ers. St. Louis would trail in the first quarter as 49ers kicker Joe Nedney got a 48-yard field goal. The Rams would take the lead in the second quarter as kicker Josh Brown got a 43-yard field goal, quarterback Marc Bulger completed a 30-yard touchdown pass to rookie wide receiver Keenan Burton, and Brown making a 38-yard field goal. After a scoreless third quarter, St. Louis added onto their lead as Brown nailed a 22-yard field goal. However, San Francisco rallied with quarterback Shaun Hill completing a 3-yard touchdown pass to former Rams wide receiver Isaac Bruce and a 48-yard touchdown pass to wide receiver Josh Morgan.

With their ninth-straight loss, St. Louis fell to 2–13 and were swept by the 49ers for the first time since 2005.

=== Week 17: at Atlanta Falcons ===
Quarter	1	2	3	4	Total
Rams	7	7	3	10	27
Falcons	3	14	7	7	31

at Georgia Dome, Atlanta, Georgia

- Game time: 1 PM EST
- Game weather: None (Domed Stadium)
- Game attendance: 64,617
- Referee: Walt Anderson
- TV announcers (Fox): Sam Rosen, Tim Ryan, & Chris Myers

Hoping to end a miserable season on a high note, the Rams flew to the Georgia Dome for a Week 17 duel with the playoff-bound Atlanta Falcons. St. Louis trailed early in the first quarter as Falcons kicker Jason Elam got a 39-yard field goal. The Rams would respond with running back Steven Jackson getting a tough 4-yard touchdown run. Atlanta would answer in the second quarter with running back Michael Turner getting a 9-yard touchdown run, yet St. Louis would strike right back as quarterback Marc Bulger completed a 16-yard touchdown pass to rookie wide receiver Donnie Avery. However, it would be the Falcons who took the halftime lead as running back Jerious Norwood got an 8-yard touchdown run.

Atlanta would increase their lead in the third quarter as quarterback Matt Ryan completed an 18-yard touchdown pass to wide receiver Roddy White. The Rams would begin to rally as kicker Josh Brown nailed a 31-yard field goal. In the fourth quarter, St. Louis would regain the lead as Jackson got a 2-yard touchdown run, followed by Brown's 27-yard field goal. However, the Falcons got the last laugh as Norwood got a 45-yard touchdown run.

With the loss, the Rams closed out their season at 2–14 and on a ten-game losing streak.
