= Bethany High School =

Coordinates: 35.513254°N 97.632142°W

Location
- 6623 North Mueller Avenue; Bethany, Oklahoma 73008; United States

Information
- School type: Public High School
- Established: 1910
- School district: Bethany School District
- Superintendent: Reuben Bellows
- Principal: David Jewell
- Teaching staff: 35.66 (FTE)
- Grades: 9–12
- Enrollment: 577 (2023–2024)
- Student to teacher ratio: 16.18
- Campus size: 6 acres (2.4 ha)
- Campus type: Suburban
- Colors: Purple and White
- Mascot: Broncho
- Website: bethanyschools.com/high

Bethany High School is located in Bethany, Oklahoma, United States. The first class graduated in 1931. In the 2014 Bethany High School won the National Blue Ribbon Award. The school mascot is a broncho.

== History ==
Bethany Public Schools was organized as School District No. 88 on December 27, 1910. Among its first trustees were J.W. Vawter and U.D.T. Murray, father of Wm. H. Murray, former governor of Oklahoma. Bonds were voted in the amount of $2,000 to erect the first building, a concrete-block, one-room structure, in 1910–11. This district was carved from a very small existing school. For a while, the school could support only one teacher, but by the 1914–15 term, the enrollment had increased to 89. This necessitated the creation of another room and the employment of a second teacher. In 1927-28 two years of high school credits were offered. Two years later, the high school offered all four years of credits and the first graduating class was in the spring of 1931. In the 2014 Bethany High School won the National Blue Ribbon Award. Construction began in the 2016 school year on new classrooms, a S.T.E.M. Building, and the Dr. Kent Shellenberger Performing Arts Center and was completed in 2017.

== Notable alumni ==
- David Busic, general superintendent for the Church of the Nazarene
- Chris Chamberlain, retired NFL linebacker
- Shannon Lucid, biochemist and NASA astronaut
- Robert Hale, opera singer
- Payton Tolle, professional baseball pitcher

== Athletic achievements ==
- In 2001, the Bethany Broncho basketball team won the class 3A state basketball title, beating Eufaula High School 57 to 55. That season the Bronchos finished 24–5.
- In 2003, the Bethany Broncho football team won the Oklahoma class 2A state football title, beating the Davis Wolves 40–6 at Owen Field in Norman, Oklahoma. The Bronchos were led by Little All City player of the year Chris Chamberlain.
- In 2010–2011, Cheer won the National Champion title in March at a Jamfest cheer competition. Bethany Cheer qualified for the Oklahoma Secondary School Achievement Association Cheer State Competition.
- In 2015, the pom team won a state championship in the category of 4A Jazz.
- In 2023 and 2024, the girls basketball team won the 4A state championship.
- In 2024, the volleyball team won the 4A state championship.

== Extracurricular activities ==
Bethany High School has extracurricular activities for the student body including, but not limited to, Key Club, Spanish Club, Student Council, National Honor Society, National Art Honor Society, Book Club, Robotics Club, Speech & Debate, Show Choir, Band, Esports, and Orchestra.

Each spring Bethany Public Schools produces an "All-School" musical including students from 5th to 12th grade. Some recent musicals include Shrek the Musical, and Once Upon a Mattress.
