= David Vobora =

American football player (born 1986)

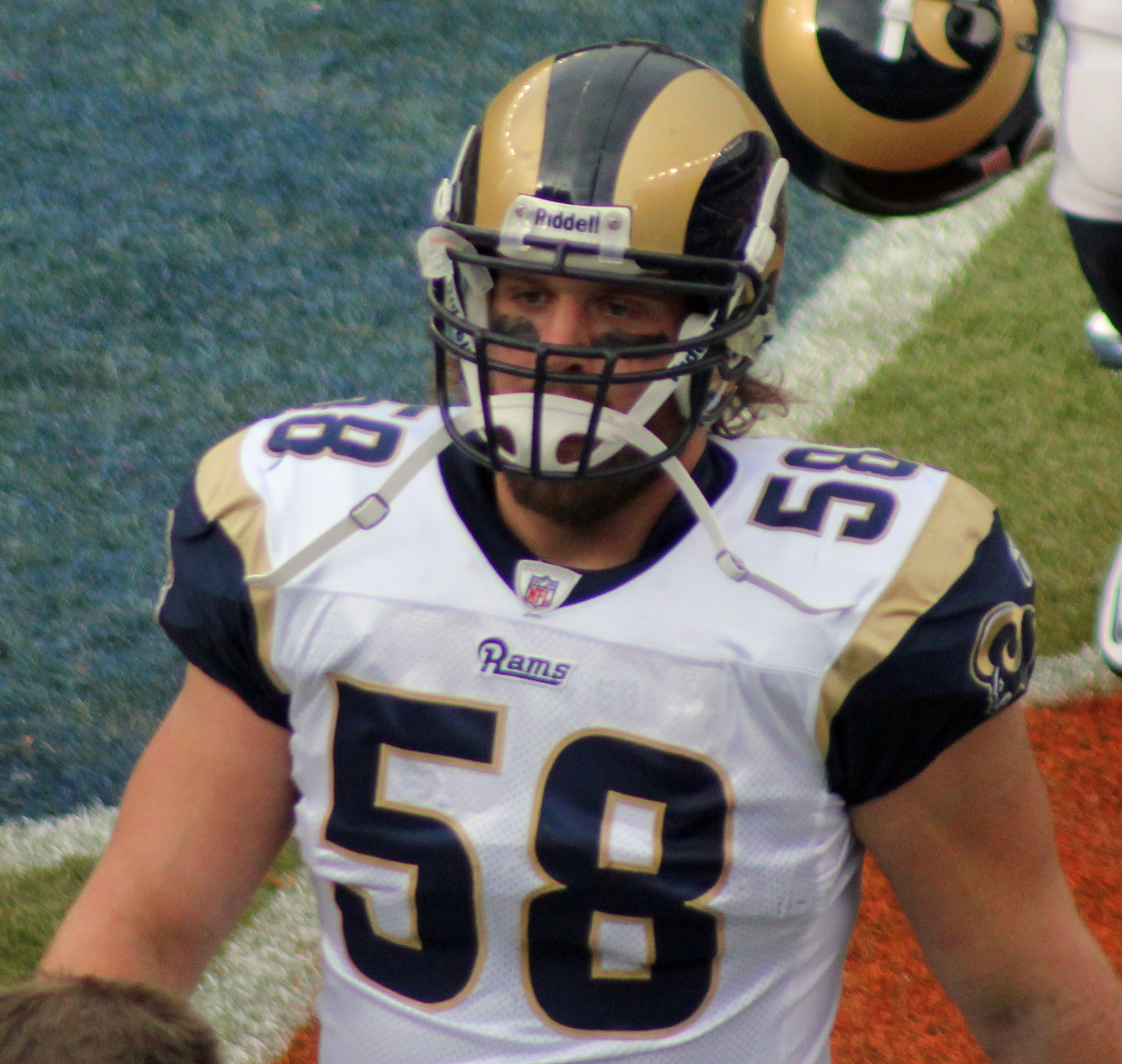
- Vobora with the St. Louis Rams in 2010

No. 58, 54
- Position: Linebacker

Personal information
- Born: April 8, 1986 (age 40); Eugene, Oregon, U.S.
- Listed height: 6 ft 2 in (1.88 m)
- Listed weight: 239 lb (108 kg)

Career information
- High school: Churchill (Eugene)
- College: Idaho
- NFL draft: 2008: 7th round, 252nd overall pick

Career history
- St. Louis Rams (2008–2010); Seattle Seahawks (2011)

Awards and highlights
- 2× First-team All-WAC (2006, 2007)

Career NFL statistics
- Total tackles: 98
- Sacks: 2
- Forced fumbles: 1
- Stats at Pro Football Reference

David Michael Vobora (born April 8, 1986) is an American former professional football player who was a linebacker in the National Football League (NFL). He was selected by the St. Louis Rams with the final pick (252nd overall) in the 2008 NFL draft, earning him the title of Mr. Irrelevant. He played college football for the Idaho Vandals of the Western Athletic Conference.

== Early life ==
Vobora is a 2004 graduate of Churchill High School in Eugene, and was the team captain as a junior and senior and played linebacker, quarterback, and running back. He was honorable mention All-Midwestern league quarterback as a senior. He was a second-team all-conference linebacker as a junior and an honorable mention all-conference linebacker as a sophomore. He was also an honorable mention basketball player as a senior.

== College career ==
In 45 games at Idaho, Vobora started 33 and ranks sixth in school history with 341 tackles (209 solo), including three sacks, 28 stops for losses. He recovered three fumbles and caused six others. He also intercepted two passes and had five pass deflections. As a senior in 2007, Vobora was All-WAC for the second consecutive season, and led Idaho in tackles with 148 (59 solo) and had a sack, an interception and a fumble recovery. As a junior in 2006, he was first-team All-WAC after leading the Vandals with 134 tackles (101 solo, 33 assists) and 15.5 tackles-for-loss and four passes defensed, two sacks, two forced fumbles, two quarterback hurries and one interception. In 2005, he played in all 11 games and started six and finished with 43 total tackles (32 solo and 11 assists) with six tackles-for-loss and forced three fumbles and had two fumble recoveries. As a true freshman in 2004 he played in all 12 games (started three) and made 17 total tackles (12 solo, five assists). Vobora played for three head coaches (Nick Holt, Dennis Erickson, & Robb Akey) in his four seasons at Idaho, and did not redshirt.

== Professional career ==
=== St. Louis Rams ===
On July 22, 2008, Vobora agreed to a three-year, $1.24 million contract with the Rams. After final cuts on August 30, Vobora and Kansas City's Ryan Succop were the only Mr. Irrelevants to make the roster of the team that drafted them in the 2000s. His stay on the roster lasted only one game, as he was waived two days after the season opener to make room for Eddie Kennison on September 9, moved to the Rams' practice squad.

Vobora remained on the Rams' practice squad until November 4, when he was promoted to the active roster after wide receivers Drew Bennett and Dante Hall were placed on injured reserve.

On November 30, Vobora made his first career start at linebacker in the game against the Miami Dolphins. This was the first time a Mr. Irrelevant started in a game during his rookie season in 14 years, not since Marty Moore started four games for the New England Patriots in 1994. Vobora compiled five total tackles in the game, which tied for the second-best effort in team tackles, but the Rams lost 16–12.

Vobora was named the starting strongside linebacker for the 2009 season. On September 30, 2009, he was suspended for four games for violating the NFL's performance-enhancing substance policy. Vobora stated that he would sue the company that produced the supplement he took, because it contained substances that were not listed on the label. Vobora's agent, Marc Lillibridge, conceded "[The supplement] was not on the list of officially sanctioned products, and ultimately a player is responsible for anything he puts in his body." On June 20, 2011, Vobora's lawyer announced that a federal judge ruled against the company and awarded Vobora $5.4 million.

The Rams released Vobora on August 12, 2011.

=== Seattle Seahawks ===
Vobora signed with the Seattle Seahawks on August 22, 2011, but was waived two weeks later on September 4. He re-signed with Seattle on October 4.

== Post-playing career ==
Upon retiring from the NFL in 2012, Vobora opened Performance Vault Inc. in Dallas, Texas, a sports performance training center for elite athletes and U.S. Special Forces.

In September 2014, Vobora founded the Adaptive Training Foundation, is a 501(c)3 non-profit with a mission "to empower the human athlete, restore hope through movement, and redefine the limits of individuals with disabilities." The foundation provides free personalized physical training programs for injured veterans and people living with disabilities. Participants in this nine-week program receive a training regimen that is customized for their fitness goals and specific disabilities.
