= Donnie Avery =

American football player (born 1984)

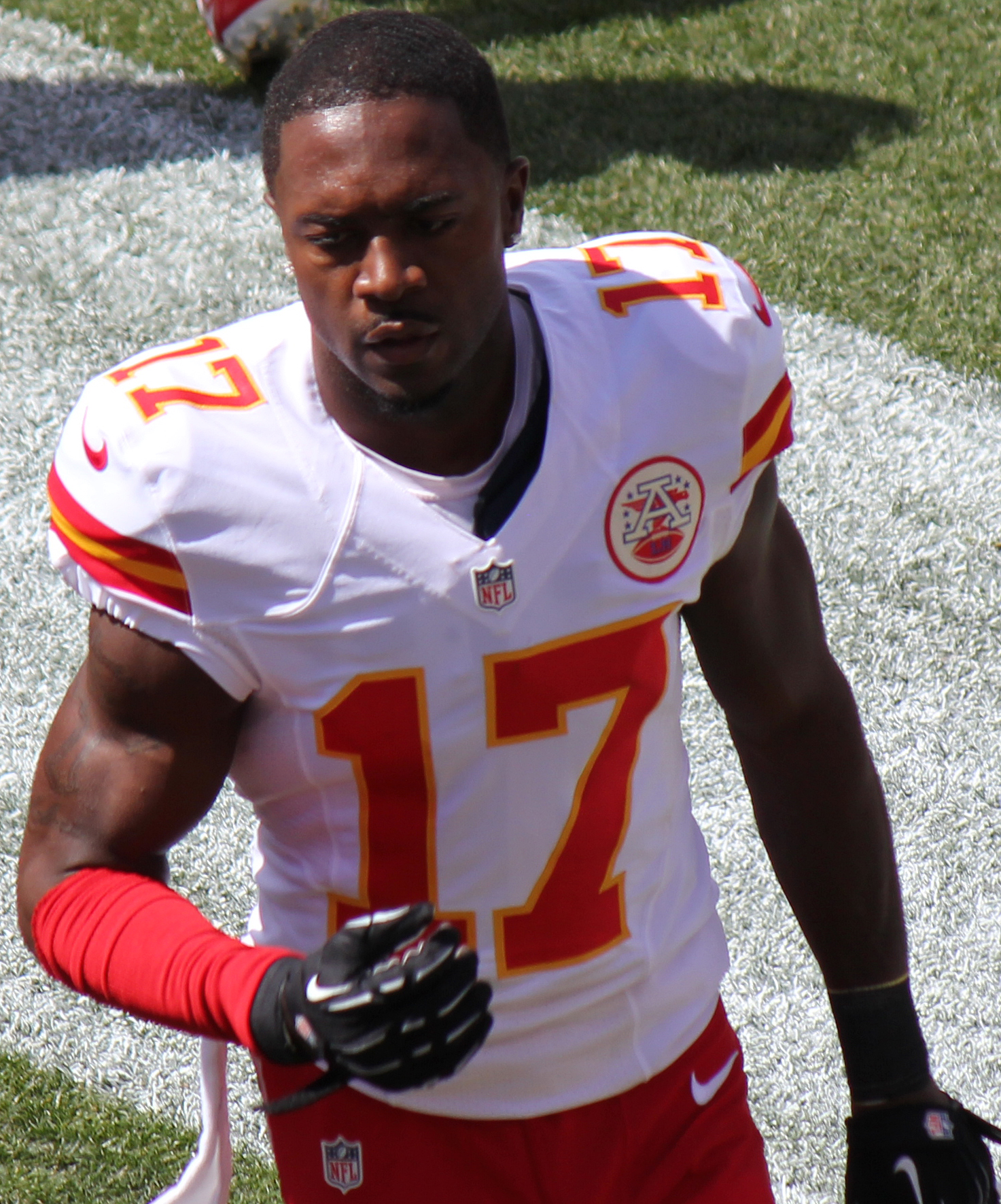
- Avery with the Kansas City Chiefs in 2014

No. 17, 82, 11
- Position: Wide receiver

Personal information
- Born: June 12, 1984 (age 42); Houston, Texas, U.S.
- Listed height: 5 ft 11 in (1.80 m)
- Listed weight: 200 lb (91 kg)

Career information
- High school: Hastings (Houston)
- College: Houston (2003–2007)
- NFL draft: 2008: 2nd round, 33rd overall pick

Career history
- St. Louis Rams (2008–2010); Tennessee Titans (2011); Indianapolis Colts (2012); Kansas City Chiefs (2013–2014)

Awards and highlights
- First-team All-Conference USA (2007)

Career NFL statistics
- Receptions: 218
- Receiving yards: 2,861
- Receiving touchdowns: 14
- Rushing yards: 114
- Rushing touchdowns: 1
- Stats at Pro Football Reference

Donnie Dion Avery (born June 12, 1984) is an American former professional football player who was a wide receiver in the National Football League (NFL). He played college football for the Houston Cougars and was selected by the St. Louis Rams in the second round of the 2008 NFL draft. Avery also played for the Tennessee Titans, Indianapolis Colts, and Kansas City Chiefs.

== Early life ==
At Hastings High School in Alief, Texas, Avery was a First-team All-District selection as both a wide receiver and return specialist as a senior. He helped lead the team to the district championship and an 11-3 record, hauling in 36 passes for 502 yards and two touchdowns to lead the District 19-5A receivers in 2002. He also returned 13 punts for 399 yards and three scores, as well as seven kickoffs for 345 yards and one touchdown, in addition to rushing 16 times for 175 yards and two scores.

== College career ==
In 2007 Avery led the Cougars with a career-high 91 catches for school and conference season records of 1,456 yards (16.0 average) and seven touchdowns. He was a First-team All-Conference USA selection. As a junior, in 2006, he caught 57 passes for 852 yards (14.9 average) and five touchdowns. In 2006, he played in 12 games, starting 10, and caught 44 passes for 688 yards and five touchdowns. He was named to the Conference USA All-Freshman team in 2004. Avery started 11 games as a redshirt freshman, finishing fourth on the team with 18 catches for 343 yards and three punt returns for 28 yards (9.3 avg.) He redshirted as a true freshman in 2003.

== Professional career ==
Pre-draft measurables
Height	Weight	Arm length	40-yard dash	10-yard split	20-yard split	20-yard shuttle	Three-cone drill	Vertical jump	Broad jump	Bench press	Wonderlic
5 ft 11 in (1.80 m)	192 lb (87 kg)	30.25 in (0.77 m)	4.28 s	1.47 s	2.51 s	3.91 s	6.30 s	37 1/2 in (0.95 m)	10 ft 6 in (3.20 m)	16 reps	14
All values from University of Houston Pro Day, except Ht, Wt, BP, Wonderlic (NFL Combine)

=== St. Louis Rams ===
He was selected by the Rams in the second round of the 2008 NFL draft. He was the first wide receiver taken in the draft in 2008. On July 26, 2008, Avery signed a four-year, $4.8 million contract which includes 3 million guaranteed. In his rookie season in the NFL, playing for the Rams, Donnie Avery caught 53 passes for 674 receiving yards and 3 touchdowns along with 1 rushing touchdown. The Carroll Rosenbloom Award for St. Louis Ram Rookie of the Year went to receiver Donnie Avery after the 2008 NFL season. Avery’s selection was hard earned. Defensive end and first-round pick Chris Long narrowly was edged out by Avery. Avery became the first non-first round pick to earn the honor since linebacker Pisa Tinoisamoa in 2003. In the third preseason game of the 2010 NFL season against the New England Patriots, Avery was carted off the field with a knee injury. Avery missed the entire 2010 season due to that injury. On September 3, 2011, Avery was released by the Rams.

=== Tennessee Titans ===
On September 28, 2011, Avery signed with the Tennessee Titans.

=== Indianapolis Colts ===
Avery signed with the Indianapolis Colts on March 23, 2012. On September 9, 2012, Avery caught a 6-yard touchdown from Andrew Luck. This was Luck's first NFL touchdown pass.

=== Kansas City Chiefs ===
On March 12, 2013, Avery signed with Kansas City Chiefs. Avery played in all 16 games for the Chiefs in 2013, catching 40 passes for 596 yards and two touchdowns for the year. Avery also played in the wildcard game against the Indianapolis Colts, catching a 79-yard touchdown pass thrown by Alex Smith, however, Kansas City ended up losing the game 44-45.

In Week 4 of the 2014 season against the New England Patriots, Avery was removed in the fourth quarter with a possible groin injury. He did not return to the game and later that week traveled to Philadelphia to undergo sports hernia surgery. By the end of Week 8, coach Andy Reid said Avery was “making progress.” He ended the 2014 season playing in only six games - making 15 receptions for 176 yards - as the Chiefs finished 9-7.

On February 17, 2015, Avery was released by the Chiefs.

=== Career statistics ===
Year	Team	Games	Receptions	Targets	Receiving Yards	Yards per Reception	Longest Reception	Receiving Touchdowns	First Downs	Fumbles	Fumbles Lost
2008	STL	15	53	102	674	12.7	69	3	30	0	0
2009	STL	16	47	97	589	12.5	50	5	28	1	1
2011	TEN	8	3	11	45	15.0	23	1	3	0	0
2012	IND	16	60	125	781	13.0	48	3	37	1	0
2013	KC	16	40	72	596	14.9	51	2	25	1	1
2014	KC	6	15	25	176	11.7	27	0	8	1	1
Total	-	77	218	432	2,861	13.1	69	14	131	4	3
