= Chris Chamberlain =

American football player (born 1985)

No. 57, 56
- Position: Linebacker

Personal information
- Born: September 30, 1985 (age 41); Bethany, Oklahoma, U.S.
- Listed height: 6 ft 2 in (1.88 m)
- Listed weight: 226 lb (103 kg)

Career information
- High school: Bethany
- College: Tulsa
- NFL draft: 2008: 7th round, 228th overall pick

Career history
- St. Louis Rams (2008–2011); New Orleans Saints (2012)

Awards and highlights
- All-Conference USA (2007)

Career NFL statistics
- Total tackles: 151
- Sacks: 2.0
- Forced fumbles: 2
- Interceptions: 1
- Stats at Pro Football Reference

Chris Chamberlain (born September 30, 1985) is an American former professional football player who was a linebacker in the National Football League (NFL). He was selected by the St. Louis Rams in the seventh round of the 2008 NFL draft. He played college football for the Tulsa Golden Hurricane.

== Early life ==
Chamberlain was a four-year letter winner and three-year starter at Bethany High School in Bethany, OK. He started at quarterback and free safety his final three years and led his team to a 13–2 record and the Class 2A state championship as a senior. He was named the District 2A-1 Player of the Year was First-team All-State. He rushed for 2,096 yards and 27 touchdowns his senior season and threw for 1,020 yards and 11 touchdowns from his quarterback position. On defense, he had 147 tackles and 10 interceptions. Chamberlain had career totals of 399 tackles and 20 interceptions and rushed for 2,777 yards and 37 touchdowns, while completing 148-of-324 passes for 2,433 yards and 29 TDs in his career. His junior season totals were 108 tackles and eight interceptions, while rushing for 518 yards and 11 TDs, and passing for 1,006 yards and eight touchdowns. The Bronchos were 32–9 with Chamberlain at quarterback. He is considered the best football player to have ever played for the Bronchos.

Chris was also a standout basketball and baseball star in high school. His Senior year he averaged 8.6 points a game for the Bronchos and helped lead them to a 20–7 record. He was lead off hitter for the Bronchos baseball team due to his great speed. His Senior year he helped lead the Bronchos to the state tournament where they fell in the first round to Sulphur 9–8. It was also at Bethany that Chris met his high school sweet heart Amy Wilcox, whom he married on March 6, 2009 in Oklahoma City.

== College career ==
As a senior at the University of Tulsa, Chamberlain played in 13 games and made 165 tackles (101 solo) with two sacks and three interceptions while being named First-team All-Conference USA. In 2006, as a junior, he was a Third-team All-Conference USA selection and had 51 tackles, 3.5 for losses and two interceptions. In 2005, he started all 13 games and had 88 tackles, and added 11 stops for losses and two forced fumbles and 4.5 sacks. He played in 11 games in 2004 and started five contests as a true freshman and was credited with 48 tackles and 5.5 for losses and had three sacks.

== Professional career ==
Pre-draft measurables
Height	Weight	40-yard dash	10-yard split	20-yard split	20-yard shuttle	Three-cone drill	Vertical jump	Broad jump
6 ft 1 5/8 in (1.87 m)	226 lb (103 kg)	4.67 s	1.56 s	2.71 s	4.09 s	6.87 s	34 1/2 in (0.88 m)	9 ft 6 in (2.90 m)
All values from Pro Day.

=== St. Louis Rams ===
He was selected by the Rams in the seventh round of the 2008 NFL draft on April 27, 2008. On July 20, 2008, Chamberlain signed a three-year $1.186 million contract with the Rams. Chamberlain led the Rams in special teams tackles in 2008 with 19.

In 2009 Chamberlain was a backup outside linebacker who made one start and led the team in special teams tackles (28) for the second consecutive season. He made 13 starts during the 2011 Regular Season and made a career-high 80 tackles.

=== New Orleans Saints ===
Chamberlain signed with the New Orleans Saints on March 23, 2012. After tearing his anterior cruciate ligament (ACL), he was placed on injured reserve on August 19, 2012. Attempting a comeback in 2013, he was again placed on injured reserve on August 27, 2013. On September 3, 2013, the Saints released Chamberlain, using a "failure to disclose" designation that indicated Chamberlain had an undisclosed physical condition, so that the Saints would not be responsible for remaining financial obligations to Chamberlain. Chamberlain's agent said he disagreed with this designation and would file a grievance to have the matter resolved.

== NFL career statistics ==
Legend
**Bold**	Career high

Year	Team	Games		Tackles					Interceptions					Fumbles			
Year	Team	GP	GS	Cmb	Solo	Ast	Sck	TFL	Int	Yds	TD	Lng	PD	FF	FR	Yds	TD
2008	STL	**16**	0	16	14	2	0.0	1	0	0	0	0	0	0	0	0	0
2009	STL	**16**	0	20	16	4	0.0	0	0	0	0	0	0	0	0	0	0
2010	STL	11	6	34	30	4	0.0	2	0	0	0	0	**2**	**1**	0	0	0
2011	STL	**16**	**13**	**81**	**64**	**17**	**2.0**	**6**	**1**	**4**	0	**4**	1	**1**	0	0	0
		59	19	151	124	27	2.0	9	1	4	0	4	3	2	0	0	0

== See also ==
- List of NCAA major college football yearly tackles leaders
