= Steven Jackson =

American football player (born 1983)

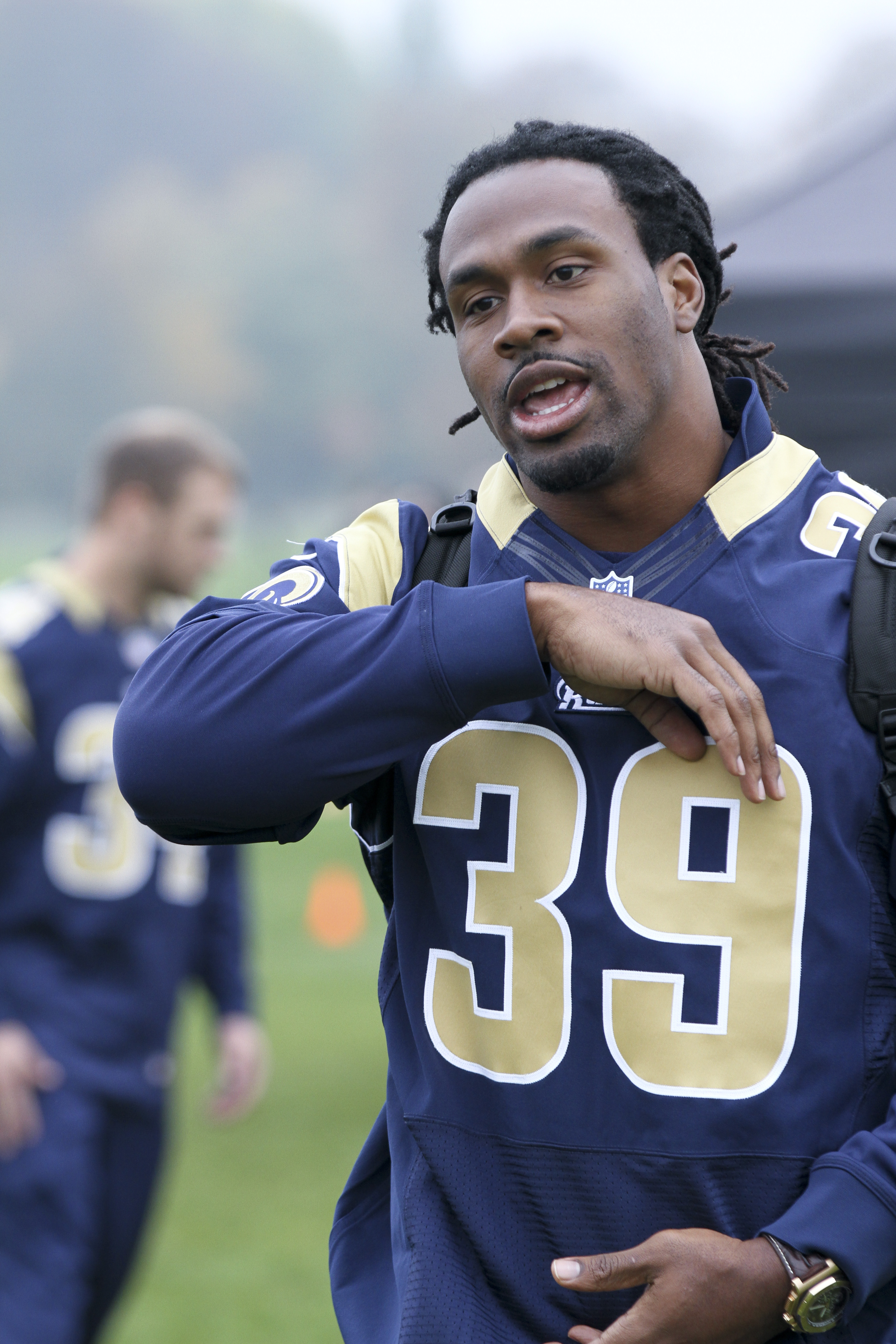
- Jackson with the St. Louis Rams in 2012

No. 39
- Position: Running back

Personal information
- Born: July 22, 1983 (age 43); Las Vegas, Nevada, U.S.
- Listed height: 6 ft 2 in (1.88 m)
- Listed weight: 240 lb (109 kg)

Career information
- High school: Eldorado (Las Vegas)
- College: Oregon State (2001–2003)
- NFL draft: 2004: 1st round, 24th overall pick

Career history
- St. Louis Rams (2004–2012); Atlanta Falcons (2013–2014); New England Patriots (2015)

Awards and highlights
- 2× Second-team All-Pro (2006, 2009); 3× Pro Bowl (2006, 2009, 2010); 2× Third-team All-American (2002, 2003); 2× First-team All-Pac-10 (2002, 2003)

Career NFL statistics
- Rushing attempts: 2,764
- Rushing yards: 11,438
- Rushing touchdowns: 69
- Receptions: 461
- Receiving yards: 3,683
- Receiving touchdowns: 9
- Stats at Pro Football Reference

Steven Rashad Jackson (born July 22, 1983) is an American former professional football running back who played in the National Football League (NFL) for 12 seasons, primarily with the St. Louis Rams. He played college football for the Oregon State Beavers, twice receiving third-team All-American and first-team All-Pac-10 honors.

Jackson was selected in the first round of the 2004 NFL draft by the Rams, where he spent his first nine seasons. During his St. Louis tenure, he became the franchise's all-time leading rusher, in addition to receiving three Pro Bowl and two second-team All-Pro selections. In his final three seasons, Jackson was a member of the Atlanta Falcons and New England Patriots. He was the 19th player to rush for 11,000 yards and only the fourth player to rush for 1,000 yards in eight consecutive seasons. His seven seasons with 1,000 rushing yards and 300 receiving yards was 3rd most by a running back.

== Early life ==
Jackson was born in Las Vegas, Nevada, and was a running back for Eldorado High School. He was named the Sunrise Regional MVP and rushed for 6,396 yards and 81 touchdowns for the Sundevils. Eldorado lost in the state final his senior year to McQueen High School (Reno, Nevada). He also lettered four years in track and field, recording a 10.6 in the 100 meters as a junior, and was a member of the 4 × 100 m (42.64 s) relay squad.

Jackson's subsequent success has been credited with prompting college football programs to take more interest in players in the Las Vegas area. This success also led to Jackson's induction into the Southern Nevada Sports Hall of Fame in 2011.

== College career ==
Jackson attended Oregon State University, where he played for the Beavers for three seasons (2001–2003). In 36 games, he carried 743 times for 3,625 yards for a 4.9-yard average and 39 touchdowns while adding 680 yards and six touchdowns on 66 catches and 240 yards with a touchdown on seven kickoff returns. His 4,545 all-purpose yards rank second in school history, while he ranks third on the school's all-time scoring list with 276 points. In his sophomore season, Jackson led the Pac-10 Conference in rushing and finished the season eighth nationally with 1,690 yards; an average of 130 yards per game. As a junior, he ranked tenth in the nation in rushing, ninth in all-purpose yardage, and fourth in scoring; he carried the ball 350 times for 1,545 yards and 19 touchdowns, adding 44 receptions for 470 yards and three touchdowns. When his collegiate career ended, Jackson's 2,015 all-purpose yards set an Oregon State school record.

== Professional career ==
=== Pre-draft ===
Pre-draft measurables
Height	Weight	Arm length	Hand span	40-yard dash	10-yard split	20-yard split	20-yard shuttle	Three-cone drill	Vertical jump	Broad jump	Bench press	Wonderlic
6 ft 1 1/2 in (1.87 m)	241 lb (109 kg)	32 1/2 in (0.83 m)	9 5/8 in (0.24 m)	4.55 s	1.57 s	2.61 s	4.09 s	7.03 s	37.5 in (0.95 m)	9 ft 10 in (3.00 m)	16 reps	28
All values from Oregon State Pro Day, except for Wonderlic score.

Jackson was overlooked by several teams in 2004, most likely due to a knee injury suffered during his last year at Oregon State that kept him from participating in drills at the 2004 NFL Combine. Jackson had surgery on the knee after the college season, but required additional surgery after his rookie year to ensure its complete rehabilitation. In an interview with CBS Sports' Pete Prisco on how the knee injury had affected his play, Jackson said, "I never felt right. Now it does."

=== St. Louis Rams ===
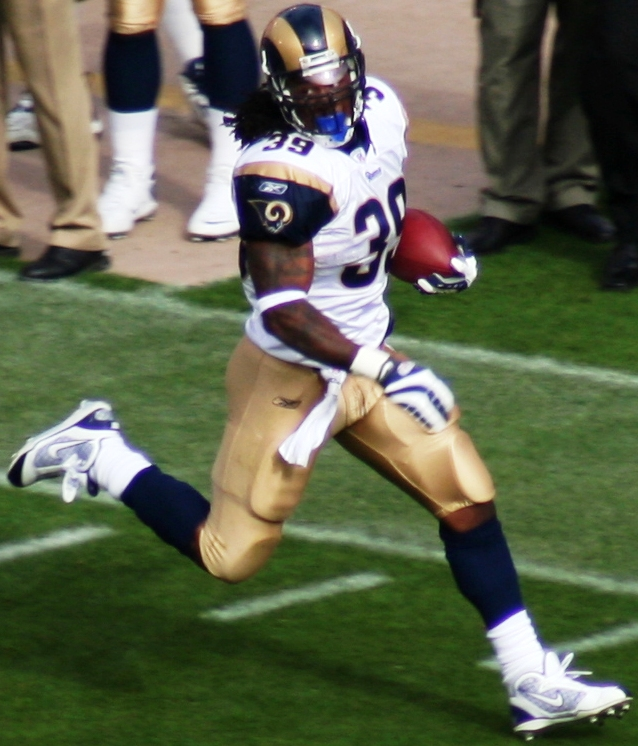
Drafted by the Rams in 2004, Jackson spent nine years with the team

Jackson was selected in the first round with the 24th overall pick in the 2004 NFL draft by the St. Louis Rams. He was the first running back to be selected that year. The Rams traded picks with the Denver Broncos and Cincinnati Bengals to get Jackson. Denver traded Deltha O'Neal to Cincinnati for their first round pick. Then, St. Louis traded up to Cincinnati's selection to grab Jackson while the Bengals chose Chris Perry to replace the departed Corey Dillon, who was traded to the New England Patriots.

==== 2004 season ====
On July 30, 2004, Jackson signed a five-year, $18.73 million deal with the Rams, which included a $2.5 million signing bonus. In his 2004 rookie season, he was a backup under Marshall Faulk. He made his NFL debut in the season opener against the Arizona Cardinals and had seven carries for 50 yards in the 17–10 victory. He scored his first professional touchdown on a two-yard rush against the San Francisco 49ers in Week 4. He saw an increased role toward the end of the season. In Week 13 against the 49ers, he had 26 carries for 119 yards for his first 100+-yard game. In Week 16, against the Philadelphia Eagles, he had his best performance of the season with 24 carries for 148 yards and a touchdown. As a rookie, he rushed 134 times for 673 rushing yards and four touchdowns, and had 19 receptions for 189 yards.

During the 2004 playoffs, Jackson played in both Rams postseason games; he logged 36 rushing yards and a reception in the Wild Card win over Seattle, and added 37 total yards in the Divisional Round loss to Atlanta, marking his first NFL postseason appearances.

==== 2005 season ====
With Faulk aging, Jackson was named the Rams' starting running back for the 2005 season. In Week 4, against the New York Giants, he had his first receiving touchdown on a 13-yard pass from Marc Bulger. In Week 7, against the New Orleans Saints, he had his first multi-touchdown game with two rushing in the 28–17 victory. In Week 8, against the Jacksonville Jaguars, he had 25 carries for 179 rushing yards to go with two receptions for 21 yards and receiving touchdown. Jackson had 1,046 rushing yards and eight rushing touchdowns on 254 attempts, and caught 43 passes for 320 yards and two receiving touchdowns.

==== 2006 season ====
After the dismissal of head coach Mike Martz and the departure of Faulk, 2006 became Jackson's breakout season. With Scott Linehan as the new head coach, the Rams had a more balanced offensive attack. He started the season off strong with 121 rushing yards in an 18–10 victory over the Denver Broncos. After rushing for 103 yards in Week 2 against the San Francisco 49ers, Jackson did not top 100 rushing yards until later in the season. However, there was a four-game stretch where he scored a rushing touchdown in each game from Week 6 to Week 10. In the second divisional game against the 49ers in Week 12, he had 121 rushing yards, one rushing touchdown, nine receptions, and 71 receiving yards. He had 127 rushing yards and two rushing touchdowns against the Oakland Raiders in Week 15. He had 150 rushing yards, one rushing touchdown, six receptions, 102 receiving yards, and one receiving touchdown against the Washington Redskins in Week 16. He was named NFC Offensive Player of the Week for Week 16. He closed the year with 142 rushing yards and three rushing touchdowns against the Minnesota Vikings in Week 17. For his productive end to the season, he was named NFC Offensive Player of the Month for December. Overall, Jackson ran 346 times for 1,528 yards and 13 rushing touchdowns and led all running backs when he caught 90 passes for 806 yards, and adding three receiving touchdowns. He led the NFL in total yards from scrimmage with 2,334. For his efforts, Jackson was named to his first Pro Bowl and received one vote for the 2006 NFL Offensive Player of the Year award.

==== 2007 season ====
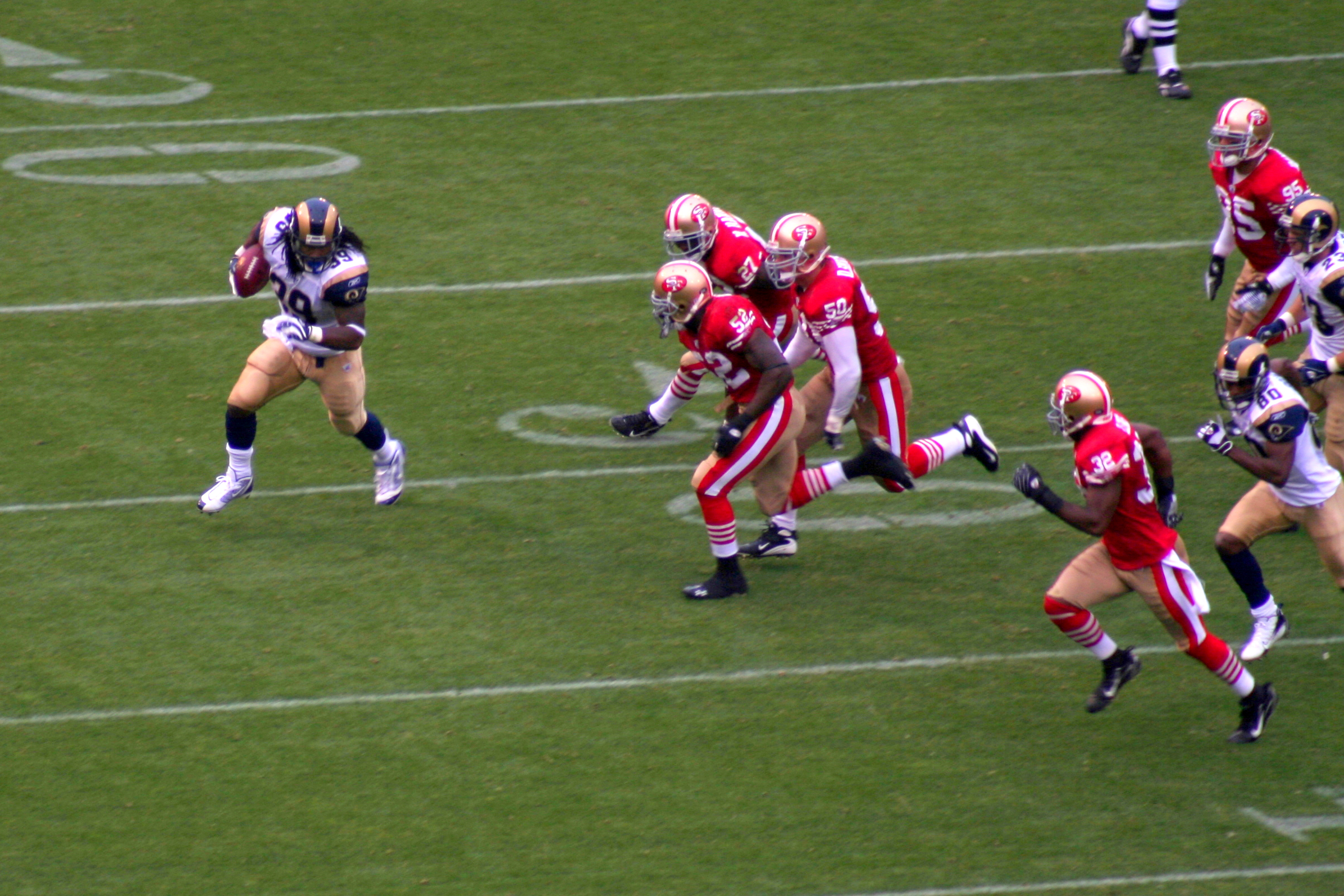
Jackson rushing against the 49ers in 2007

Jackson started the 2007 season with 58 rushing yards in a 27–17 loss to the Carolina Panthers. In Week 3, against the Tampa Bay Buccaneers, he had 30 carries for 115 rushing yards. In Week 15, against the Green Bay Packers, he had a season-high 143 rushing yards and a rushing touchdown. During the Rams' dismal 2007 season, Jackson lashed out at fans and expressed distaste with the music played in the Edward Jones Dome. Overall, he finished the 2007 season with 1,002 rushing yards, five rushing touchdowns, 38 receptions, 271 receiving yards, and one receiving touchdown.

==== 2008 season ====
After the season, with one year left on his rookie contract, Jackson believed he was underpaid and held out of training camp. On August 21, 2008, Jackson officially ended his holdout by signing a six-year contract worth a maximum of $49.3 million, including a $11.4 million signing bonus and $21 million guaranteed. Because the final two years of the deal (2012 and 2013) can be voided based on Jackson's performance, it could become a three-year extension worth $29.3 million instead. Either way, signing the contract made him the highest-paid running back in the NFL. In Week 7, against the Dallas Cowboys, he had 25 carries for 160 yards and three rushing touchdowns. His performance against the Cowboys gave him his second NFC Offensive Player of the Week award. He closed out the season with 161 rushing yards and two rushing touchdowns against the Atlanta Falcons. Overall, he finished the 2008 season with 253 carries for 1,042 rushing yards and seven rushing touchdowns to go with 40 receptions for 379 receiving yards and one receiving touchdown.

==== 2009 season ====
After recording 67 rushing yards in a 28–0 loss to the Seattle Seahawks in the season opener, Jackson had 104 rushing yards against the Washington Redskins in a 9–7 loss and 117 rushing yards against the Green Bay Packers in a 36–17 loss. In Week 7, against the Indianapolis Colts, he started a four-game stretch with over 100 rushing yards in each game with a rushing touchdown in the latter three against the Detroit Lions, New Orleans Saints, and the Arizona Cardinals. Overall, he finished the season with 1,416 rushing yards, four rushing touchdowns, 51 receptions, and 322 receiving yards. He was named to his second Pro Bowl.

==== 2010 season ====
Jackson started the 2010 season with 81 rushing yards in a 17–13 loss to the Arizona Cardinals. He rushed for over 100 in three consecutive games against the Detroit Lions, San Diego Chargers, and the Tampa Bay Buccaneers. Jackson surpassed Eric Dickerson as the Rams' all-time leading rusher, with a 110-yard effort against the Buccaneers game. On November 21, 2010, he recorded his 10,000th career yard from scrimmage on a first quarter run against the Atlanta Falcons. Jackson rushed for 1,145 yards during the 2011 regular season, marking the seventh consecutive season he has surpassed 1,000 yards. He earned his third Pro Bowl nomination for the 2010 season. He was ranked 38th by his fellow players on the NFL Top 100 Players of 2011.

==== 2011 season ====
Jackson started the 2011 season with two carries for 56 yards and a rushing touchdown against the Philadelphia Eagles. In Week 8, against the New Orleans Saints, he had 25 carries for 159 yards and two touchdowns. He followed that up with 130 rushing yards against the Arizona Cardinals and 128 rushing yards against the Cleveland Browns. Overall, Jackson recorded 1,145 rushing yards, five rushing touchdowns, 42 receptions, 333 receiving yards, and one receiving touchdown. He was ranked 37th by this fellow players on the NFL Top 100 Players of 2012.

==== 2012 season ====
The 2012 draft saw the Rams select two running backs, Daryl Richardson and Isaiah Pead, indicating a potential future running back by committee scenario. With the retirement of LaDainian Tomlinson, Jackson became the NFL's active leader in career rushing yards, where he remained for over three years until passed by Frank Gore in October 2015. In Week 12, against the Arizona Cardinals, he had a season-high 139 rushing yards. In Week 15, Jackson became the 27th running back in NFL history to rush for over 10,000 yards, and the sixth running back in league history to compile eight consecutive 1,000-yard rushing seasons. Jackson ended the 2012 season with 1,042 yards rushing and four touchdowns. At the conclusion of the season, Jackson chose to opt-out of the final year of his contract, to pursue a starting job on a contender.

=== Atlanta Falcons ===
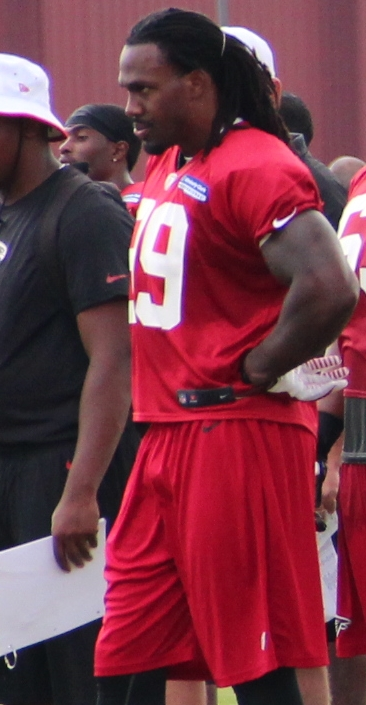
Jackson in 2013 with the Falcons

On March 14, 2013, Jackson signed a three-year contract with the Atlanta Falcons. Jackson failed to rush for 1,000 yards for the first time since his rookie season in 2004, finishing the 2013 season with 543 rushing yards on 157 attempts. He had two games on the season with two rushing touchdowns, against the Buffalo Bills and Washington Redskins. In the 2014 season, Jackson's rushing numbers improved with 707 rushing yards in 15 games. Jackson was released by the Falcons on February 26, 2015.

=== New England Patriots ===
On December 21, 2015, Jackson signed with the New England Patriots. He scored his first touchdown of the season in the Patriots' 20–10 loss to the Miami Dolphins on January 3. He scored his first career playoff touchdown in the AFC Championship 20–18 loss to the Denver Broncos. The loss to the Broncos ended up being Jackson's final professional game.

=== Retirement and legacy ===
On July 29, 2019, Jackson signed a ceremonial one-day contract with the by-then Los Angeles Rams to officially retire as a member of the team.

He is considered one of the greatest running backs during the NFL's "golden age" for the position in the 2000s, but whose career was stunted because he played for lackluster teams. The Rams never recorded a winning record during his tenure, only making the playoffs when he was a rookie at 8–8, and he played for six head coaches. Jacob Robinson of The Athletic wrote Jackson would have been in the Pro Football Hall of Fame had that era's Rams not "wasted his prime", while Sports Illustrated's Brock Vierra opined he "would be in the conversation for greatest running back of all time" had his career taken place later under the Rams' Super Bowl-winning coach Sean McVay. Jackson echoed similar sentiment in 2018, opining he could continue running for 1,000 yards annually with McVay. Eligible for the Hall of Fame since 2021, Jackson said in 2024 he would be appreciative about making it but "I don't really think much about it" otherwise.

Discussing his legacy in 2018, Jackson commented:

"Everyone doesn't get the wins. Some guy's going to be lucky this year, be a rookie to win the Super Bowl. And you have somebody like myself that plays 12 years and doesn't get a chance."

Jackson was inducted into the St. Louis Sports Hall of Fame in 2024.

== Career statistics ==
=== NFL ===
Year	Team	Games		Rushing					Receiving				
Year	Team	GP	GS	Att	Yds	Avg	Lng	TD	Rec	Yds	Avg	Lng	TD
2004	STL	14	3	134	673	5.0	48	4	19	189	9.9	28	0
2005	STL	15	15	254	1,046	4.1	51	8	43	320	7.4	27	2
2006	STL	16	16	346	1,528	4.4	59	13	90	806	9.0	64T	3
2007	STL	12	12	237	1,002	4.2	54	5	38	271	7.1	37	1
2008	STL	12	11	253	1,042	4.1	56	7	40	379	9.5	53	1
2009	STL	15	15	324	1,416	4.4	58	4	51	322	6.3	38	0
2010	STL	16	16	330	1,241	3.8	42	6	46	383	8.3	49	0
2011	STL	15	15	260	1,145	4.4	47	5	42	333	7.9	50	1
2012	STL	16	16	258	1,045	4.1	46	4	38	321	8.4	22	0
2013	ATL	12	12	157	543	3.5	50	6	33	191	5.8	25	1
2014	ATL	15	15	190	707	3.7	55	6	20	148	7.4	17	0
2015	NE	2	1	21	50	2.4	7	1	1	20	20.0	20	0
Total		160	147	2,764	11,438	4.1	59	69	461	3,683	8.0	64	9

=== College ===
Season	Team	Conf	Class	Pos	GP	Rushing				Receiving			
Season	Team	Conf	Class	Pos	GP	Att	Yds	Avg	TD	Rec	Yds	Avg	TD
2001	Oregon State	Pac-10	FR	RB	11	74	390	5.3	5	5	45	9.0	1
2002	Oregon State	Pac-10	SO	RB	13	319	1,690	5.3	15	17	165	9.7	2
2003	Oregon State	Pac-10	JR	RB	13	350	1,545	4.4	19	44	470	10.7	3
Career					37	743	3,625	4.9	39	66	680	10.3	6

== Career highlights ==
=== Awards and honors ===
NFL

- 2× Second-team All-Pro (2006, 2009)
- 3× Pro Bowl (2006, 2009, 2010)
- 2× NFL Top 100 — 38th (2011), 37th (2012)

College

- 2× Third-team All-American (2002, 2003)
- 2× First-team All-Pac-10 (2002, 2003)

=== Records ===
==== NFL records ====
- Most consecutive seasons with 4+ rushing touchdowns (11) – tied with Emmitt Smith
- Most consecutive seasons with a 40+ yard run (11)
- Most rushing attempts by a player without a 60+ yard run (2,764)
- Most consecutive touches without a fumble (unofficial) – (870) from November 13, 2011, through end of career
- Only player with 1,500 yards rushing and 800 yards receiving in a single season (2006)

==== Rams franchise records ====
- Most career rushing yards (10,138)
- Only Rams player to record 150 rushing yards and 100 receiving yards in same game (December 24, 2006, against the Washington Redskins)

== Personal life ==
Jackson wore the #39 for the number of books in the Old Testament.
