= Clifton Ryan =

American football player (born 1984)

No. 95
- Position: Defensive tackle

Personal information
- Born: February 18, 1984 (age 42); Saginaw, Michigan, U.S.
- Listed height: 6 ft 2 in (1.88 m)
- Listed weight: 290 lb (132 kg)

Career information
- High school: Hill (Saginaw)
- College: Michigan State
- NFL draft: 2007: 5th round, 154th overall pick

Career history
- St. Louis Rams (2007–2010)

Career NFL statistics
- Total tackles: 121
- Sacks: 3
- Forced fumbles: 3
- Fumble recoveries: 2
- Stats at Pro Football Reference

Clifton Ryan (born February 18, 1984) is an American former professional football player who was a defensive tackle in the National Football League (NFL). He played college football for the Michigan State Spartans and was selected by the St. Louis Rams in the fifth round of the 2007 NFL draft.

== Early life ==
Ryan went to Arthur Hill High School in Saginaw, Michigan, where he finished with 310 tackles and 12 sacks.

== College career ==
Ryan played college football at Michigan State, where he played in 50 games, making 35 starts and finished his career with 118 tackles and 10.5 sacks. As a senior, he totaled 25 tackles, six for losses and four sacks. As a sophomore, he had 41 tackles (eight for a loss) and 2.5 sacks. He majored in kinesiology.

== Professional career ==
Pre-draft measurables
Height	Weight	40-yard dash	10-yard split	20-yard split	20-yard shuttle	Three-cone drill	Vertical jump	Broad jump	Bench press
6 ft 2 1/8 in (1.88 m)	305 lb (138 kg)	5.07 s	1.69 s	2.91 s	4.69 s	7.36 s	29 in (0.74 m)	8 ft 6 in (2.59 m)	25 reps
All values from NFL Combine.

=== St. Louis Rams ===
Ryan was selected by the St. Louis Rams in the fifth round (154th overall) of the 2007 NFL draft. On July 14, 2007, the St. Louis Rams agreed to terms with Ryan on a three-year $1.24 million contract that included a $129,000 signing bonus. In his debut season, he played in all 16 games finishing the season with 48 tackles and two sacks. He was not re-signed following the 2010 season and became a free agent on March 17, 2011. His career was cut short due to concussions.

== NFL career statistics ==
Legend
**Bold**	Career high

Year	Team	Games		Tackles					Interceptions					Fumbles			
Year	Team	GP	GS	Cmb	Solo	Ast	Sck	TFL	Int	Yds	TD	Lng	PD	FF	FR	Yds	TD
2007	STL	**16**	0	**48**	**42**	6	**2.0**	3	0	0	0	0	0	**3**	**1**	0	0
2008	STL	**16**	12	31	23	**8**	0.0	5	0	0	0	0	**1**	0	0	0	0
2009	STL	**16**	**15**	42	35	7	1.0	**9**	0	0	0	0	**1**	0	0	0	0
2010	STL	1	0	0	0	0	0.0	0	0	0	0	0	0	0	**1**	**18**	0
		49	27	121	100	21	3.0	17	0	0	0	0	2	3	2	18	0
