= Oshiomogho Atogwe =

Canadian football player (born 1981)

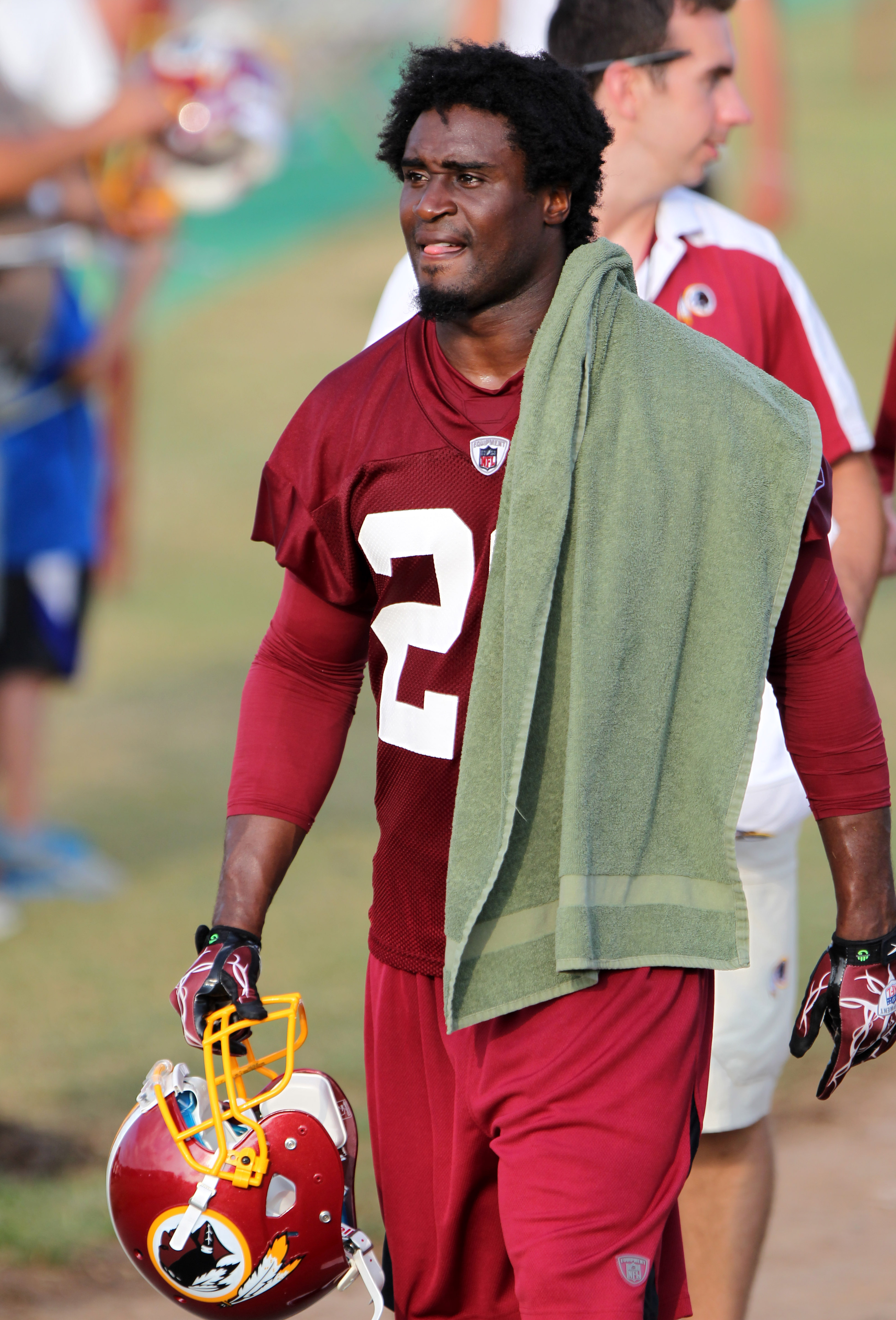
- Atogwe with the Washington Redskins in 2011

No. 21, 20
- Position: Safety

Personal information
- Born: June 23, 1981 (age 45); Windsor, Ontario, Canada
- Listed height: 5 ft 11 in (1.80 m)
- Listed weight: 205 lb (93 kg)

Career information
- High school: Herman (Windsor)
- College: Stanford (2000–2004)
- NFL draft: 2005: 3rd round, 66th overall pick
- CFL draft: 2004: 1st round, 5th overall pick

Career history

Playing
- St. Louis Rams (2005–2010); Washington Redskins (2011); Philadelphia Eagles (2012)*
- * Offseason or practice squad member only

Coaching
- Memphis Express (2019) Secondary coach

Career NFL statistics
- Total tackles: 454
- Sacks: 5.5
- Forced fumbles: 16
- Fumble recoveries: 8
- Interceptions: 25
- Defensive touchdowns: 2
- Stats at Pro Football Reference

Oshiomogho Isaac "O.J." Atogwe (born June 23, 1981) is a Canadian former professional football player who was a safety in the National Football League (NFL). He was selected by the St. Louis Rams in the third round of the 2005 NFL draft. He played college football for the Stanford Cardinal. Atogwe was also a member of the Washington Redskins and Philadelphia Eagles.

== Early life ==
Atogwe attended high school at W.F. Herman Secondary School in Windsor, Ontario, Canada. While he was there he starred in football, soccer, basketball, and track and field. In basketball, he was a three-time All-City selection and was the league MVP as a senior. Atogwe was named All-Canada, All-Ontario and All-Academic. In football, he was a two-year starter at running back and cornerback and was named the league's Defensive MVP in 1999, under head coach Harry Lumley. He was also All-city as a running back. He was a league MVP in basketball as a senior and three-time All-City selection and competed in the long jump (OFSAA Gold Medalist - 2000), triple jump (OFSAA Silver Medalist - 2000) and 200-metre dash (22.8) in track.

== College career ==
Atogwe played college football and ran track for the Stanford Cardinal in the Pac-10 conference where during his career he made nine interceptions. Atogwe redshirted as a freshman at Stanford in 2000. He appeared in every game as a reserve free safety in 2001, producing four tackles on special teams. Atogwe took over the strong safety position in 2002, going on to start the next 33 games. He led the team with 71 tackles (47 solos), a sack, a fumble recovery, three forced fumbles, three interceptions and four pass deflections. He was named team co-MVP and earned second-team All-Pac-10 Conference honours in 2003, as he again led the team with a career-high 90 tackles (54 solos), including five stops behind the line of scrimmage, two interceptions and eight pass deflections while manning the free safety position. He also led the FBS with six fumble recoveries and six forced fumbles. As a senior in 2004, Atogwe started all 11 games and finished with 76 tackles, four for a loss, four interceptions and seven passes broken up.

Atogwe also was a member of the Stanford track team in 2001 and 2002. He participated in the sprints and jumps, and his best marks in 2002 included 22' 10" in the long jump and 43' 3¾" in the triple jump. He was a Biological Sciences major.

== Professional career ==
=== Pre-draft measurables ===
Pre-draft measurables
Height	Weight	40-yard dash	10-yard split	20-yard split	Vertical jump	Bench press	Wonderlic
5 ft 11 in (1.80 m)	219 lb (99 kg)	4.58 s	1.55 s	2.67 s	36 in (0.91 m)	22 reps	30
All values from NFL Combine.

Other notable measurements: 335-pound bench press, 525-pound squat, 285-pound power clean

=== St. Louis Rams ===
Atogwe was selected by the St. Louis Rams in the third round (66th overall) of the 2005 NFL draft. On July 28, 2005, Atogwe signed a three-year $1.6 million contract with the Rams.

In his rookie year he played in 12 games, finishing the year with 11 tackles, one sack, an interception, and a fumble recovery. The following season, he finished the campaign with 72 tackles and three interceptions and forced five fumbles. In the 2007 season, Atogwe had a team and NFC-high 8 interceptions along with 75 tackles and one touchdown and forced two fumbles. On April 22, 2008, the Rams tendered Atogwe a one-year deal for $2.017 million which he signed to remain with the club. In the 2008 season he recorded five interceptions to lead the Rams once again. He also recorded 83 tackles and forced six fumbles.

On February 19, 2009, the Rams used their franchise tag on Atogwe. The tag was the non-exclusive franchise which allowed other teams to negotiate with Atogwe, but if any signed him that team had to give the Rams two first-round picks as compensation. As part of the designation Atogwe received a one-year tender of $6.342 million. On July 15, 2009, the Rams signed Atogwe to a one-year, $6.342 million contract. On December 9, Atogwe was placed on injured reserve due to a dislocated right shoulder.

In June 2010 he signed a five-year contract worth $32 million with the Rams. The Rams released Atogwe on February 18, 2011.

=== Washington Redskins ===
On March 3, 2011, Atogwe agreed to terms on a five-year, $26 million deal with the Washington Redskins. He made his first interception for the Redskins in Week 6 against the Philadelphia Eagles. In Week 15 against the New York Giants, Atogwe made a leaping interception and returned it for 26 yards after London Fletcher deflected Eli Manning's pass to DJ Ware. Atogwe played 13 games, starting eight of them, in the 2011 NFL season and recorded 60 combined tackles, one-half sacks, three interceptions, and six pass break-ups. He was released following the 2011 NFL season on March 12, 2012.

=== Philadelphia Eagles ===
The Philadelphia Eagles signed Atogwe to a one-year contract on June 20, 2012. However, Atogwe was waived on August 31.

== NFL career statistics ==
Legend
	Led the league
**Bold**	Career high

Year	Team	Games		Tackles					Interceptions					Fumbles			
Year	Team	GP	GS	Cmb	Solo	Ast	Sck	TFL	Int	Yds	TD	Lng	PD	FF	FR	Yds	TD
2005	STL	12	0	12	10	2	1.0	1	1	42	0	42	1	0	1	0	0
2006	STL	**16**	**16**	75	66	9	1.0	0	3	8	0	7	10	5	1	0	0
2007	STL	**16**	**16**	75	66	9	0.0	1	**8**	**125**	**1**	**52**	**12**	0	1	0	0
2008	STL	**16**	**16**	**85**	**77**	8	0.0	1	5	91	0	43	5	**6**	**3**	**75**	**1**
2009	STL	12	12	74	58	16	1.0	1	2	21	0	12	5	3	2	0	0
2010	STL	**16**	15	73	64	9	**2.0**	**5**	3	53	0	34	9	2	0	0	0
2011	WAS	13	8	60	35	**25**	0.5	1	3	42	0	26	6	0	0	0	0
		101	83	454	376	78	5.5	10	25	382	1	52	48	16	8	75	1

== Coaching career ==
On December 18, 2018, it was announced on the Alliance of American Football website that Atogwe was hired to be the Memphis Express's secondary coach. For the inaugural season of the league, he worked under head coach Mike Singletary, his father-in-law. On April 3, 2019, it was announced that the AAF would suspend all football operations.

== Boxing ==
Since retiring from football, Atogwe has taken up boxing and has competed in a few amateur matches.

== See also ==
- List of Canadian sports personalities
