= David Roach (American football) =

American football player (born 1985)

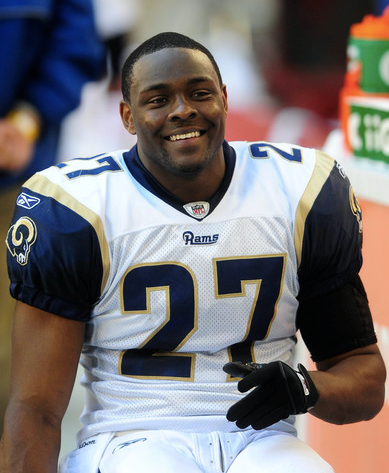

No. 27
- Position: Safety

Personal information
- Born: August 9, 1985 (age 41); Abilene, Texas, U.S.
- Listed height: 6 ft 2 in (1.88 m)
- Listed weight: 215 lb (98 kg)

Career information
- High school: Abilene
- College: TCU
- NFL draft: 2008: undrafted

Career history
- New Orleans Saints (2008)*; St. Louis Rams (2008–2009); Detroit Lions (2010)*
- * Offseason or practice squad member only

Awards and highlights
- Second-team All-MW (2007)

Career NFL statistics
- Total tackles: 15
- Stats at Pro Football Reference

David Johnathan Roach (born August 9, 1985) is an American former professional football player who was a safety in the National Football League (NFL). He was signed by the New Orleans Saints as an undrafted free agent in 2008. He played college football for the TCU Horned Frogs.

== Early life ==
Roach was a First-team All-District 3-5A performer at Abilene High School. He was named to the All-Big Country Super Team after recorded 89 tackles as a senior, broke up four passes, caused one fumble and recovered another.

== College career ==
In 2007 Roach had a career-best 73 tackles, 2 forced fumbles, 5 pass break ups and 1 interception while starting all 12 games after moving from weak safety to free safety mid season. In 2006, as a junior, he started 11 of 13 games and made 33 tackles (26 solo) with four pass break-ups. In 2005, he started the opening two games and played in 11 games and made 41 tackles (25 solo) and 2 interceptions. In 2004, he played in 10 games with 2 starts and recorded 19 tackles, including nine solo stops. In 2003, he had a season-ending knee injury early in fall camp.

== Professional career ==
Pre-draft measurables
Height	Weight	40-yard dash	10-yard split	20-yard split	20-yard shuttle	Three-cone drill	Vertical jump	Broad jump	Bench press
6 ft 0 3/8 in (1.84 m)	210 lb (95 kg)	4.53 s	1.55 s	2.63 s	4.15 s	6.88 s	38 in (0.97 m)	10 ft 3 in (3.12 m)	16 reps
All values from NFL Combine.

=== New Orleans Saints ===
Roach was signed by the New Orleans Saints as an undrafted free agent in 2008 and stayed for six games as a member of their practice squad. He was released in October 2008.

=== St. Louis Rams ===
After being released by the Saints he was signed by the St. Louis Rams in October 2008. He was waived on August 17, 2010.

=== Detroit Lions ===
On August 19, 2010, he signed with the Detroit Lions and was then waived/injured on August 27, 2010.
