= Jacob Bell (American football) =

American football player (born 1981)

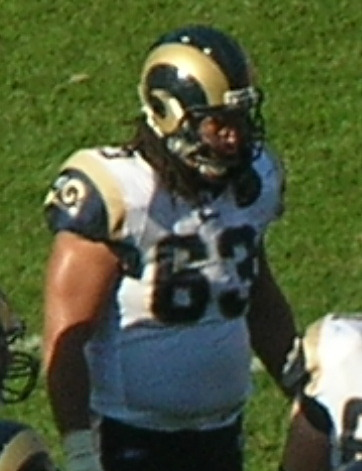
- Bell with the Rams in 2008

No. 60, 63
- Position: Guard

Personal information
- Born: March 2, 1981 (age 45); Cleveland, Ohio, U.S.
- Listed height: 6 ft 5 in (1.96 m)
- Listed weight: 304 lb (138 kg)

Career information
- High school: St. Ignatius (Cleveland, Ohio)
- College: Miami (OH)
- NFL draft: 2004: 5th round, 138th overall pick

Career history
- Tennessee Titans (2004–2007); St. Louis Rams (2008–2011); Cincinnati Bengals (2012)*
- * Offseason or practice squad member only

Awards and highlights
- PFWA All-Rookie Team (2004)

Career NFL statistics
- Games played: 109
- Games started: 100
- Fumble recoveries: 3
- Stats at Pro Football Reference

Jacob Bell (born March 2, 1981) is an American former professional football player who was a guard in the National Football League (NFL). He was selected by the Tennessee Titans in the fifth round of the 2004 NFL draft. Bell also played for the St. Louis Rams. He played college football for the Miami RedHawks.

== Early life ==
Bell was born on the west side of Cleveland, Ohio before moving to Cleveland Heights in his youth. He displayed an interest in sports from early on, of which football was one of his favorites. He attended Saint Ignatius High School (Cleveland, Ohio) before winning a scholarship at Miami University in Ohio.

== College career ==
Bell played in 39 games with 38 starts at Miami University, gaining starting experience at left tackle (13 games), right tackle (two) and right guard (23). As senior, started all 14 games at right guard and earned first-team All-MAC honors en route to conference championship. Helped Redhawks set school and conference records for most points (553) and most total yards (7,016). Also helped team set school record for rushing touchdowns in season (34). As junior, started first two contests at left tackle before shifting to right guard, where he started nine of next 10 games. Started every game as redshirt freshman at left tackle and gained two starts there as sophomore. He graduated with degree in sport organization and was a member of the Phi Delta Theta fraternity.

== Professional career ==
=== Pre-draft ===
In his 2004 pre-draft workouts, Bell was timed in 4.98 seconds in the 40-yard dash, performed 30 bench press repetitions of 225 pounds and posted a 32-inch vertical leap.

Pre-draft measurables
Height	Weight	40-yard dash	10-yard split	20-yard split	Vertical jump	Bench press	Wonderlic
6 ft 4 3/4 in (1.95 m)	302 lb (137 kg)	4.98 s	1.80 s	3.02 s	32 in (0.81 m)	30 reps	22
All values from NFL Combine, except 40-yd, Vert, and BP, which are from Miami (OH) pro day.

=== Tennessee Titans ===
He signed a three-year $1.1 million contract with the Titans as a rookie in 2004. As a rookie in 2004, Bell played in 15 games with 14 starts at left guard before tearing his right anterior cruciate ligament against Denver (12/25). En route to being named to All-Rookie teams of ESPN.com, Football Digest and Pro Football Weekly, helped Chris Brown rush for 1,067 yards and protected Steve McNair and Billy Volek as they combined for 3,829 passing yards. In 2005 Bell played in nine games with one start at right tackle at Pittsburgh (9/11/2005). He also saw action at right guard, left tackle and on special teams. In 2006, started 13 games at left guard and two games at right tackle as he helped pave way for fifth ranked rushing attack in NFL and five 200-yard rushing games which ranked second in the NFL. Bell helped Travis Henry amass 1,211 rushing yards and opened rushing lanes for Offensive Rookie of the Year Vince Young as he gained 552 rushing yards, becoming the first rookie quarterback in the Super Bowl era to reach 500 rushing yards.

In 2007, Bell signed a one-year $1.85 million tender offer as a restricted free agent. In 2007 Bell played in a career-high 16 games with 16 starts...also started in Titans’ playoff contest. He opened holes for rushing attack that ranked fifth in the NFL gaining 2,109 yards (131.8 yards per game) behind RB LenDale White's career-high 1,110 yards.

=== St. Louis Rams ===
On March 3, 2008, he signed a six-year $36 million deal with the St. Louis Rams. The deal contained $13 million guaranteed, including a $7 million signing bonus. In 2008, Bell played in 13 games (all starts).

=== Cincinnati Bengals ===
Bell signed with the Cincinnati Bengals on April 6, 2012.

=== Retirement ===
On May 8, 2012, Bell announced his retirement. The following day Bell said about his abrupt decision to retire only one month after joining the Bengals,

"I've been thinking about some different things, thinking about health, thinking about the future of my family having to deal with some kind of crazy disease that nobody even knows about, where people want their brains studied after they're dead, donating their brains to research. It's just crazy to see how someone like Junior Seau took his own life over -- God knows what he was really struggling and dealing with. But you have to believe it came from the game of football. I want to get out before the game makes me get out, where I can get out on my own terms, and I can limit the amount of stress and negative impact that the game would leave on me. I played under a guy, Mike Munchak in Tennessee, and I used to watch him as he was running around the practice field for a half hour before practice, and I'd see the way he'd run," Bell said. "He played 13 seasons, he played all 13 seasons with no cartilage in his knees. And I thought to myself, I don't want to look like that. I don't want to be at the point where I'm jeopardizing my true health for money pretty much. For money and for celebrity."
