= 2010 St. Louis Rams season =

73rd season in franchise history, first under ownership of Stan Kroenke

- Owner: Stan Kroenke
- General manager: Billy Devaney
- Head coach: Steve Spagnuolo
- Home stadium: Edward Jones Dome

Results
- Record: 7–9
- Division place: 2nd NFC West
- Playoffs: Did not qualify
- Pro Bowlers: RB Steven Jackson

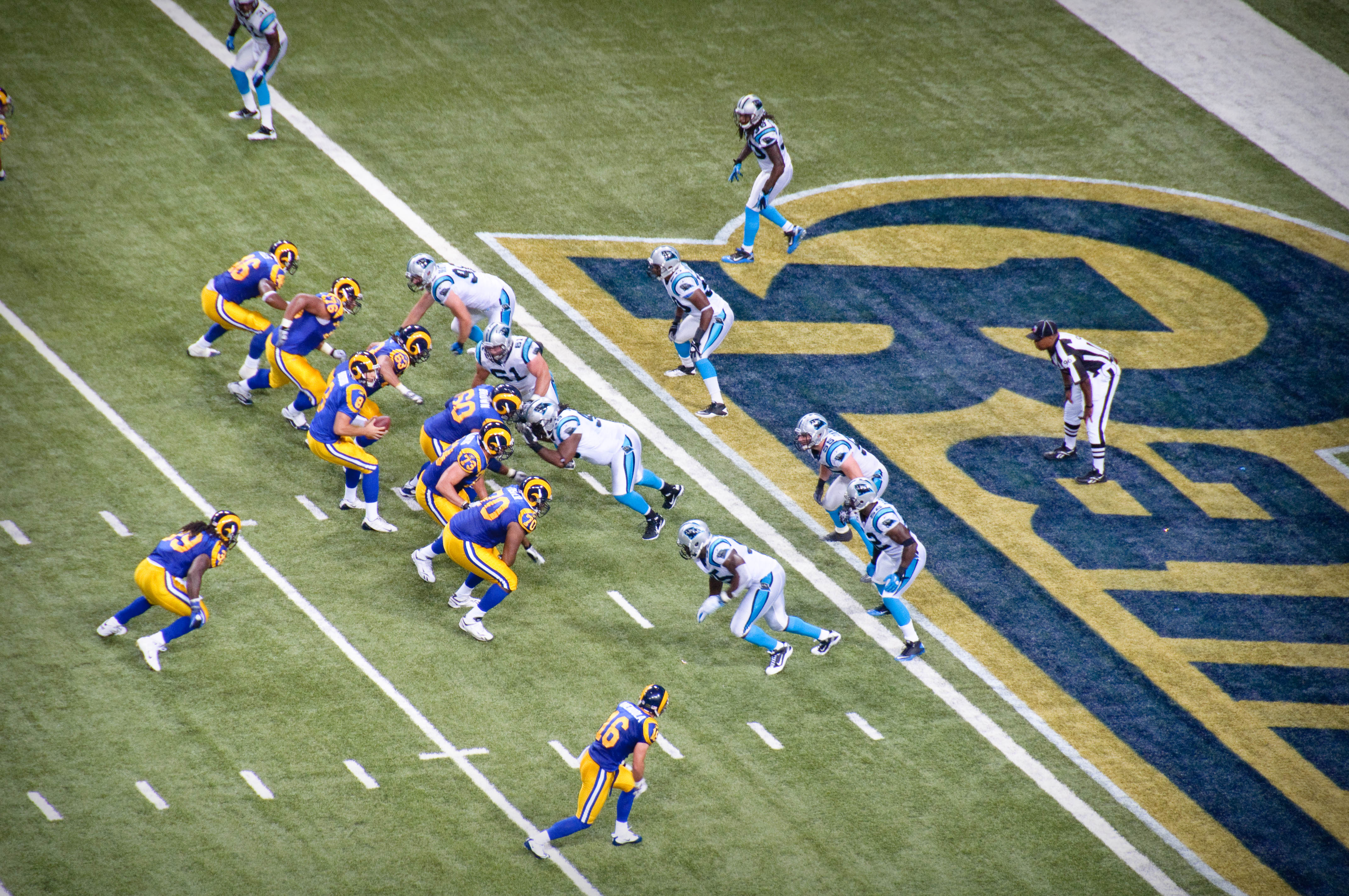
St. Louis at home to Carolina in week 8 of the season, on October 31, 2010

The 2010 season was the St. Louis Rams' 73rd in the National Football League (NFL), and their 16th in St. Louis. The team greatly improved on their near winless record of 1–15 from the 2009 season by achieving more total victories than in their previous three seasons combined for a record of 7–9, which almost won a weak NFC West ultimately decided by a loss to the Seattle Seahawks in the final week. Since the start of the 2007 NFL season, the Rams had won just 6 combined games and had not qualified for the playoffs since 2004. In the 2010 NFL draft, the Rams had the number 1 overall pick, which they picked Sam Bradford from Oklahoma. This year marked their second season under head coach Steve Spagnuolo. The Rams played all of their home games at the Edward Jones Dome, in St. Louis, Missouri.

The Rams fired two trainers (Jim Anderson and Dake Walden), and assistant line coach Art Valero left for the Seattle Seahawks.

Stan Kroenke was approved by the NFL on August 25, 2010, to purchase 100% of the Rams from the current owners Chip Rosenbloom and Lucia Rodriguez. Kroenke took control of the team before the start of the 2010 season. He also owns the Denver Nuggets of the NBA, as well as the Colorado Avalanche of the NHL.

== Offseason ==
=== Key departures ===
Quarterback Marc Bulger was released by the Rams on April 5, 2010.

=== 2010 NFL draft ===
The Rams picked first in the first round after finishing the 2009 season with the worst overall record at 1–15. In addition, the Rams had a fifth round pick from the Philadelphia Eagles from a trade that sent LB Will Witherspoon to the Eagles, and a seventh round pick from the Atlanta Falcons from a trade that sent CB Tye Hill to the Falcons.

The Rams selected University of Oklahoma QB Sam Bradford with their 2010 number 1 overall pick.

St. Louis Rams 2010 NFL Draft selections
Draft order			Player name	Position	Height	Weight	College	Contract	Notes
Round	Choice	Overall	Player name	Position	Height	Weight	College	Contract	Notes
1	1	1	Sam Bradford	QB	6' 4"	236	Oklahoma		
2	1	33	Rodger Saffold	OT	6' 5"	318	Indiana		
3	1	65	Jerome Murphy	CB	6' 0"	196	South Florida		
4	1	99	Mardy Gilyard	WR	5' 11 7/8"	187	Cincinnati		
5	1	132	Michael Hoomanawanui	TE	6' 5"	270	Illinois		
5	4	135	From Washington Redskins, traded to the Atlanta Falcons						
5	18	149	Hall Davis	DE	6' 4"	271	Louisiana		From Atlanta Falcons
5	24	163	From Philadelphia Eagles, traded to the Denver Broncos						
6	1	170	Fendi Onobun	TE	6' 6"	249	Houston		
6	19	189	Eugene Sims	DE	6' 6"	235	W. Texas A&M		From Atlanta Falcons
7	1	208	Traded to the Washington Redskins						
7	4	211	Marquis Johnson	CB	5' 11"	192	Alabama		From Washington Redskins
7	19	226	George Selvie	DE	6' 4"	245	South Florida		From Atlanta Falcons
7	47	254	Josh Hull	LB	6' 3"	240	Penn State		Compensatory pick

== Staff ==
St. Louis Rams 2010 staff
Front office: Owner/chairman – Chip Rosenbloom; Owner/vice chairman – Stan Kroenke; Executive vice president of football operations/coo – Kevin Demoff; general manager – Billy Devaney; Vice president of player personnel – Tony Softli; Director of pro personnel - Mike Williams; Director of player personnel – Lawrence McCutcheon; Director of college scouting – John Mancini; Head coaches: Head coach – Steve Spagnuolo; Assistant head coach/quarterbacks – Dick Curl; Offensive coaches: Offensive coordinator – Pat Shurmur; Running backs – Sylvester Croom; Wide receivers – Nolan Cromwell; Tight ends – Frank Leonard; Offensive line – Steve Loney; Quality control/offense – Andy Sugarman	Defensive coaches: Defensive coordinator – Ken Flajole; Defensive line – Brendan Daly; Linebackers – Paul Ferraro; Defensive backs/cornerbacks – Clayton Lopez; Defensive backs/safeties – Andre Curtis; Quality control/defense – Matt House; Special teams coaches: Special teams coordinator – Tom McMahon; Quality control/special teams – Derius Swinton; Strength and conditioning: Strength – Rock Gullickson; Assistant strength – Chuck Faucette

== Final roster ==
2010 St. Louis Rams roster
Quarterbacks (QB): 8 Sam Bradford; 4 A. J. Feeley; Running backs (RB): 34 Kenneth Darby; 39 Steven Jackson; 44 Mike Karney FB; 38 Keith Toston; Wide receivers (WR): 84 Danario Alexander; 16 Danny Amendola; 11 Brandon Gibson; 81 Mardy Gilyard; 19 Laurent Robinson; Tight ends (TE): 47 Billy Bajema; 46 Daniel Fells; 86 Michael Hoomanawanui; 88 Derek Schouman	Offensive linemen (OL): 63 Jacob Bell G; 60 Jason Brown C; 70 Renardo Foster T; 65 Hank Fraley C; 73 Adam Goldberg G; 79 John Greco G; 76 Rodger Saffold T; 77 Jason Smith T; Defensive linemen (DL): 99 C. J. Ah You DE; 93 Jermelle Cudjo DT; 71 Gary Gibson DT; 96 James Hall DE; 72 Chris Long DE; 98 Fred Robbins DT; 97 Darell Scott DT; 90 George Selvie DE; 92 Eugene Sims DE	Linebackers (LB): 57 Chris Chamberlain OLB; 59 Larry Grant OLB; 52 Curtis Johnson OLB; 50 Bryan Kehl OLB; 55 James Laurinaitis MLB; 51 David Nixon OLB; 58 David Vobora MLB; Defensive backs (DB): 21 Oshiomogho Atogwe FS; 24 Ron Bartell CB; 37 James Butler S; 36 Quincy Butler CB; 43 Craig Dahl SS; 35 Kevin Dockery CB; 32 Bradley Fletcher CB; 31 Justin King CB; 22 Michael Lewis SS; 23 Jerome Murphy CB; 20 Darian Stewart FS; Special teams (ST): 3 Josh Brown K; 5 Donnie Jones P; 45 Chris Massey LS	Practice squad: 25 Marquis Johnson CB (IR); 12 Thad Lewis QB; 68 Ryan McKee RT; 83 Brandon McRae WR (IR); 82 Greg Mathews WR; 67 Drew Miller C; 94 Jimmy Saddler-McQueen DT; 54 Maurice Simpkins OLB; 33 Chauncey Washington RB; 18 Joe West WR; Reserve: 17 Donnie Avery WR (IR); 89 Mark Clayton WR (IR); 15 Dominique Curry WR (IR); 53 Na'il Diggs OLB (IR); 93 Chris Hovan DT (IR); 56 Josh Hull MLB (IR); 87 Darcy Johnson TE (IR); 49 Brit Miller FB (IR); 48 Fendi Onobun TE (IR); 95 Clifton Ryan DT (IR); 66 Mark Setterstrom C/G (PUP); Rookies in italics 53 active, 13 reserve, 8 practice squad

== Preseason ==
=== Schedule ===
The Rams preseason schedule was announced on March 31, 2010.

Week	Date	Opponent	Result	Record	Game site	NFL.com recap
1	August 14	Minnesota Vikings	L 7–28	0–1	Edward Jones Dome	Recap
2	August 21	at Cleveland Browns	W 19–17	1–1	Cleveland Browns Stadium	Recap
3	August 26	at New England Patriots	W 36–35	2–1	Gillette Stadium	Recap
4	September 2	Baltimore Ravens	W 27–21	3–1	Edward Jones Dome	Recap

=== Game summaries ===
==== Week 1: vs Minnesota Vikings ====
Quarter	1	2	3	4	Total
Vikings	0	14	7	7	28
Rams	7	0	0	0	7

at Edward Jones Dome, St. Louis, Missouri

- Date: Saturday, August 14, 2010
- Game time: 19:00
- Game weather: None (domed stadium)
- Game attendance: 40,801
- Referee: Clete Blakeman
- Recap, Game Book

Game information

- STL – Danny Amendola 93-yard punt return (Shaun Suisham kick), 1:29
- MIN – Logan Payne 2-yard pass from Sage Rosenfels (Ryan Longwell kick), 12:13
- MIN – Garrett Mills 65-yard pass from Sage Rosenfels (Ryan Longwell kick), 6:45
- MIN – Marko Mitchell 71-yard pass from Sage Rosenfels (Rhys Lloyd kick), 3:14
- MIN – Mickey Shuler 2-yard pass from Joe Webb (Rhys Lloyd kick), 6:49

Passing

- MIN – Rosenfels – 23/34, 310
- STL – Bradford – 6/13, 57

Rushing

- MIN – Gerhart – 8–24
- STL – Toston – 4–16

Receiving

- MIN – Mills – 4–106
- STL – Ogbonnaya – 4–31

== Regular season ==
=== Schedule ===
In addition to their regular games against NFC West division rivals, the Rams played games against the NFC South and AFC West according to the NFL's schedule rotation, and also played games against the Detroit Lions, who had finished last in the NFC North in 2009, and the Washington Redskins, who had finished last in the NFC East in 2009.

Week	Date	Opponent	Result	Record	Game site	NFL.com recap
1	September 12	Arizona Cardinals	L 13–17	0–1	Edward Jones Dome	Recap
2	September 19	at Oakland Raiders	L 14–16	0–2	Oakland–Alameda County Coliseum	Recap
3	September 26	Washington Redskins	W 30–16	1–2	Edward Jones Dome	Recap
4	October 3	Seattle Seahawks	W 20–3	2–2	Edward Jones Dome	Recap
5	October 10	at Detroit Lions	L 6–44	2–3	Ford Field	Recap
6	October 17	San Diego Chargers	W 20–17	3–3	Edward Jones Dome	Recap
7	October 24	at Tampa Bay Buccaneers	L 17–18	3–4	Raymond James Stadium	Recap
8	October 31	Carolina Panthers	W 20–10	4–4	Edward Jones Dome	Recap
9	Bye					
10	November 14	at San Francisco 49ers	L 20–23 (OT)	4–5	Candlestick Park	Recap
11	November 21	Atlanta Falcons	L 17–34	4–6	Edward Jones Dome	Recap
12	November 28	at Denver Broncos	W 36–33	5–6	INVESCO Field at Mile High	Recap
13	December 5	at Arizona Cardinals	W 19–6	6–6	University of Phoenix Stadium	Recap
14	December 12	at New Orleans Saints	L 13–31	6–7	Louisiana Superdome	Recap
15	December 19	Kansas City Chiefs	L 13–27	6–8	Edward Jones Dome	Recap
16	December 26	San Francisco 49ers	W 25–17	7–8	Edward Jones Dome	Recap
17	January 2	at Seattle Seahawks	L 6–16	7–9	Qwest Field	Recap

=== Game summaries ===
==== Week 1: vs. Arizona Cardinals ====
Week 1: Arizona Cardinals at St. Louis Rams – Game summary

Quarter	1	2	3	4	Total
Cardinals	0	10	0	7	17
Rams	0	10	3	0	13

at Edward Jones Dome, St. Louis, Missouri

- Date: September 12
- Game time: 3:15 p.m. CDT
- Game weather: None (Domed stadium)
- Game attendance: 52,440
- Referee: Alberto Riveron
- TV announcers (FOX): Ron Pitts, John Lynch & Nischelle Turner
- Recap

Game information

First quarter

- No scoring plays

Second quarter

- ARI – Jay Feely 22 yard field goal, Cardinals 3–0, Drive: 10 plays, 56 yards, 4:01.
- STL – Josh Brown 46 yard field goal, Tied 3–3, Drive: 8 plays, 44 yards, 4:36.
- ARI – Tim Hightower 1 yard run (Jay Feely kick), Cardinals 10–3, Drive: 5 plays, 76 yards, 2:34.
- STL – Laurent Robinson 1 yard pass form Sam Bradford (Josh Brown kick), Tied 10–10, Drive: 8 plays, 63 yards, 1:20.

Third quarter

- STL – Josh Brown 25 yard field goal, Rams 13–10, Drive: 7 plays, 31 yards, 3:26.

Fourth quarter

- ARI – Larry Fitzgerald 21 yard pass from Derek Anderson (Jay Feely kick), Cardinals 17–13, Drive: 7 plays, 86 yards, 3:56.

Top passers

- ARI – Derek Anderson – 22/41, 297 yards, 1 touchdown
- STL – Sam Bradford – 32/55, 253 yards, 1 touchdown, 3 interceptions

Top rushers

- ARI – Tim Hightower – 13 rushes, 54 yards, 1 touchdown
- STL – Steven Jackson – 22 rushes, 81 yards

Top receivers

- ARI – Steve Breaston – 7 receptions, 132 yards
- STL – Mark Clayton – 10 receptions, 119 yards

Top tacklers

- ARI – Greg Toler – 13 rushes, 1 forced fumble
- STL – Oshiomogho Atogwe – 8 tackles, 1 forced fumble

The St. Louis Rams began their season at home for an NFC West match against the Arizona Cardinals. The Rams trailed in the 2nd quarter with Cardinals kicker Jay Feely nailing a 22-yard field goal, which was replied when Rams kicker Josh Brown made a 46-yard field goal. The Rams fell behind again with running back Tim Hightower making a 1-yard TD run, but were able to score with rookie quarterback Sam Bradford making a 1-yard TD pass to wide receiver Laurent Robinson. In the third quarter, the Rams took the lead for the first time when Brown nailed a 25-yard field goal, but it went downhill in the fourth quarter when quarterback Derek Anderson made a 21-yard TD pass to wide receiver Larry Fitzgerald, giving St. Louis a loss.

With the loss, St. Louis began the season at 0–1.

==== Week 2: at Oakland Raiders ====
Week 2: St. Louis Rams at Oakland Raiders – Game summary

Quarter	1	2	3	4	Total
Rams	0	7	0	7	14
Raiders	0	3	10	3	16

at Oakland–Alameda County Coliseum, Oakland, California

- Date: September 19
- Game time: 1:05 pm. PDT
- Game weather: 72 °F (22 °C) (Cloudy)
- Game attendance: 48,396
- Referee: Tony Corrente
- TV announcers (FOX): Ron Pitts, John Lynch and Nischelle Turner
- Recap

Game information

First quarter

- No scoring plays

Second quarter

- STL – Mark Clayton 7 yard pass from Sam Bradford (Josh Brown kick), Rams 7–0, Drive: 6 plays, 64 yards, 3:16.
- OAK – Sebastian Janikowski 38 yard field goal, Rams 7–3, Drive: 6 plays, 9 yards, 2:12.

Third quarter

- OAK – Sebastian Janikowski 41 yard field goal, Rams 7–6, Drive: 9 plays, 59 yards, 4:06.
- OAK – Louis Murphy 4 yard pass from Bruce Gradkowski (Sebastian Janikowski kick), Raiders 13–7, Drive: 7 plays, 83 yards, 3:33.

Fourth quarter

- OAK – Sebastian Janikowski 22 yard field goal, Raiders 16–7, Drive: 10 plays, 67 yards, 5:24.
- STL – Mark Clayton 17 yard pass from Sam Bradford (Josh Brown kick), Raiders 16–14, Drive: 4 plays, 59 yards, 0:47.

Top passers

- STL – Sam Bradford – 14/25, 167 yards, 2 touchdowns, 1 interception
- OAK – Bruce Gradkowski – 11/21, 162 yards, 1 touchdown, 1 interception

Top rushers

- STL – Steven Jackson – 19 rushes, 75 yards
- OAK – Darren McFadden – 30 rushes, 145 yards

Top receivers

- STL – Steven Jackson – 4 receptions, 50 yards
- OAK – Louis Murphy – 6 receptions, 91 yards, 1 touchdown

Top tacklers

- STL – James Laurinaitis – 9 tackles
- OAK – Tyvon Branch, Kamerion Wimbley – 4 tackles, 1 assist, 1 sack

Hoping to rebound from their divisional loss to the Cardinals the Rams flew to Oakland–Alameda County Coliseum for an Interconference duel with the Oakland Raiders. In the 2nd quarter the Rams would score first with QB Sam Bradford making a 7-yard TD pass to WR Mark Clayton. Then the Raiders replied with kicker Sebastian Janikowski nailing a 38-yard field goal; then he booted a 41-yard field goal in the third quarter. Then the Rams fell behind when QB Bruce Gradkowski made a 4-yard TD pass to WR Louis Murphy, followed in the fourth quarter by Janikowski nailing a 22-yard field goal. The Rams cut the lead when Bradford found WR Mark Clayton on a 17-yard TD pass, but couldn't pull out the victory.

With the close loss and 13th straight loss to an AFC opponent, the Rams fell to 0–2.

==== Week 3: vs. Washington Redskins ====
Week 3: Washington Redskins at St. Louis Rams – Game summary

Quarter	1	2	3	4	Total
Redskins	0	13	3	0	16
Rams	14	0	7	9	30

at Edward Jones Dome, St. Louis, Missouri

- Date: September 26
- Game time: 3:05 pm. CDT
- Game weather: None (dome stadium)
- Game attendance: 52,370
- Referee: Walt Coleman
- TV announcers (FOX): Dick Stockton, Charles Davis, Jim Mora & Laura Okmin
- Recap

Game information

First quarter

- STL – Steven Jackson 42 yard run (Josh Brown kick), Rams 7–0, Drive: 8 plays, 60 yards, 3:29.
- STL – Daniel Fells 3 yard pass from Sam Bradford (Josh Brown kick), Rams 14–0, Drive: 2 plays, 3 yards, 0:41.

Second quarter

- WAS – Graham Gano 29 yard field goal, Rams 14–3, Drive: 6 plays, 53 yards, 1:58.
- WAS – Santana Moss 21 yard pass from Donovan McNabb (Graham Gano kick), Rams 14–10, Drive: 1 plays, 21 yards, 0:06.
- WAS – Graham Gano 24 yard field goal, Rams 14–13, Drive: 8 plays, 77 yards, 4:54.

Third quarter

- WAS – Graham Gano 21 yard field goal, Redskins 16–14, Drive: 5 plays, 70 yards, 2:21.
- STL – Kenneth Darby 12 yard run (Josh Brown kick), Rams 21–16, Drive: 12 plays, 74 yards, 5:24.

Fourth quarter

- STL – Josh Brown 37 yard field goal, Rams 24–16, Drive: 11 plays, 46 yards, 5:20.
- STL – Josh Brown 29 yard field goal, Rams 27–16, Drive: 9 plays, 41 yards, 4:31.
- STL – Josh Brown 36 yard field goal, Rams 30–16, Drive: 7 plays, 23 yards, 1:55.

Top passers

- WAS – Donovan McNabb – 19/32, 236 yards, 1 touchdown, 1 interception
- STL – Sam Bradford – 23/37, 235 yards, 1 touchdown, 1 interception

Top rushers

- WAS – Ryan Torain – 7 rushes, 46 yards
- STL – Steven Jackson – 10 rushes, 58 yards, 1 touchdown

Top receivers

- WAS – Santana Moss – 6 receptions, 124 yards, 1 touchdown
- STL – Mark Clayton – 5 receptions, 85 yards

Top tacklers

- WAS – London Fletcher – 8 tackles, 1 assist
- STL – James Laurinaitis – 6 tackles, 1 assist

After two close losses the Rams hoped to bounce back at the Edward Jones Dome for their first win of the season. On the first possession the Rams drove down the field and capped off their drive with a 41-yard touchdown run by Steven Jackson. On the ensuing Redskins drive, Donovan McNabb drove into Rams territory before Na'il Diggs forced a fumble on Santana Moss. James Butler, who was playing for an injured Craig Dahl picked up the fumbled and returned it 49 yards before being forced out of bounds. Bradford threw a three-yard touchdown pass to Daniel Fells to make the score 14–0. The Redskins tried to start their offense again, but after being stopped on third down had to punt. Graham Gano's punt was blocked however by Rams rookie wide receiver Dominique Curry, and the Rams took over in striking distance for another touchdown. Sam Bradford threw his first interception of the day, and the Redskins were able to take over again, and were able to score a field goal. On the kickoff after the Redskins field goal, Mardy Gilyard, the Rams rookie kick returner/wide receiver fumbled the ball, and the Redskins took over on the 21 yard line. Donovan McNabb hit Santana Moss for a touchdown the next play. Steven Jackson was injured on the next drive for the Rams, and the Rams were unable to score. The next drive the Redskins kicked another field goal to make the score 13–14. The Rams marched down the field one last time, but were stalled in the redzone. With 31 seconds left Josh Brown attempted a field goal, but the Redskins blocked the kick and at the half the Rams led 14–13. At the start of the second half, McNabb hit Moss for a 56-yard pass. The Rams kept the Redskins out of the endzone, and Washington settled for the go ahead field goal to make the score 16–14. The next drive St. Louis marched down the field, and Kenneth Darby, playing for an injured Steven Jackson scored his first TD of the year from 12 yards out to make the score 21–16. Redskins were unable to score during the fourth quarter however, and McNabb was picked off by Bradly Fletcher as he attempted a comeback. Josh Brown kicked three field goals in the final quarter to seal the Rams first victory of the year with a score of 30–16, snapping a 13-game home losing skid. This win also marked their highest scoring performance in a regular season game since their 34–14 victory over the Dallas Cowboys on October 19, 2008.

With the win, the Rams improved to 1–2.

==== Week 4: vs. Seattle Seahawks ====
Week 4: Seattle Seahawks at St. Louis Rams – Game summary

Quarter	1	2	3	4	Total
Seahawks	0	3	0	0	3
Rams	7	3	7	3	20

at Edward Jones Dome, St. Louis, Missouri

- Date: October 3
- Game time: 12:00 pm. CDT
- Game weather: None (dome stadium)
- Game attendance: 52,326
- Referee: Pete Morelli
- TV announcers (FOX): Ron Pitts, John Lynch & Nischelle Turner
- Recap

Game information

First quarter

- STL – Brandon Gibson 15 yard pass from Sam Bradford (Josh Brown kick), Rams 7–0, Drive: 10 plays, 90 yards, 4:09.

Second quarter

- SEA – Olindo Mare 22 yard field goal, Rams 7–3, Drive: 14 plays, 81 yards, 6:29.
- STL – Josh Brown 30 yard field goal, Rams 10–3, Drive: 8 plays, 45 yards, 1:01.

Third quarter

- STL – Kenneth Darby 21 yard pass from Sam Bradford (Josh Brown kick), Rams 17–3, Drive: 8 plays, 67 yards, 2:59.

Fourth quarter

- STL – Josh Brown 31 yard field goal, Rams 20–3, Drive: 9 plays, 44 yards, 4:42.

Top passers

- SEA – Matt Hasselbeck – 20/36, 191 yards, 1 interception
- STL – Sam Bradford – 23/41, 289 yards, 2 touchdowns, 1 interception

Top rushers

- SEA – Justin Forsett – 19 rushes, 65 yards
- STL – Steven Jackson – 22 rushes, 70 yards

Top receivers

- SEA – Brandon Stokley – 4 receptions, 62 yards
- STL – Mark Clayton – 5 receptions, 72 yards

Top tacklers

- SEA – Marcus Trufant – 7 tackles, 1 assist
- STL – Craig Dahl, Justin King – 6 tackles

The Rams' fourth game was played at home in an NFC west rivalry match against the Seattle Seahawks. In the first quarter the Rams took the early lead as QB Sam Bradford completed a 15-yard TD pass to WR Brandon Gibson. The Seahawks cut the lead with kicker Olindo Mare nailing a 22-yard field goal, but the Rams increased their lead when kicker Josh Brown made a 30-yard field goal, followed in the 3rd quarter by Bradford completing a 21-yard TD pass to RB Kenneth Darby. Then Josh Brown made a 31-yard field goal.

With the victory, the Rams improved to 2–2, thus successfully improving on their previous season. The win also snapped a 10-game regular season losing streak to the Seahawks.

==== Week 5: at Detroit Lions ====
Week 5: St. Louis Rams at Detroit Lions – Game summary

Quarter	1	2	3	4	Total
Rams	3	3	0	0	6
Lions	3	21	7	13	44

at Ford Field, Detroit, Michigan

- Date: October 10
- Game time: 1:00 p.m. EDT
- Game weather: None (domed stadium)
- Game attendance: 55,714
- Referee: Bill Leavy
- TV announcers (Fox): Ron Pitts & John Lynch
- Recap

Game information

First quarter

- DET – Jason Hanson 30 yard field goal, Lions 3–0, Drive: 5 plays, 29 yards, 1:16.
- STL – Josh Brown 28 yard field goal, Tied 3–3, Drive: 12 plays, 62 yards, 6:20.

Second quarter

- DET – Stefan Logan 105 yard kickoff return (Jason Hanson kick), Lions 10–3, Drive: 0 plays, 0 yards, 0:14.
- DET – Calvin Johnson 1 yard pass from Shaun Hill (Jason Hanson kick), Lions 17–3, Drive: 13 plays, 81 yards, 7:16.
- STL – Josh Brown 28 yard field goal, Lions 17–6, Drive: 12 plays, 68 yards, 4:37.
- DET – Brandon Pettigrew 3 yard pass from Shaun Hill (Jason Hanson kick), Lions 24–6, Drive: 12 plays, 80 yards, 1:27.

Third quarter

- DET – Nate Burleson 26 yard pass from Shaun Hill (Jason Hanson kick), Lions 31–6, Drive: 4 plays, 41 yards, 1:53.

Fourth quarter

- DET – Jason Hanson 48 yard field goal, Lions 34–6, Drive: 10 plays, 52 yards, 4:23.
- DET – Jason Hanson 47 yard field goal, Lions 37–6, Drive: 4 plays, 2 yards, 1:31.
- DET – Alphonso Smith 42 yard interception return (Jason Hanson kick), Lions 44–6.

Top passers

- STL – Sam Bradford – 23/45, 215 yards, 2 interceptions
- DET – Shaun Hill – 21/32, 227 yards, 3 touchdowns

Top rushers

- STL – Steven Jackson – 25 rushes, 114 yards
- DET – Jahvid Best – 17 rushes, 59 yards

Top receivers

- STL – Danny Amendola – 12 receptions, 95 yards
- DET – Nate Burleson – 4 receptions, 56 yards, 1 touchdown

Top tacklers

- STL – James Laurinaitis – 4 tackles, 3 assists
- DET – Julian Peterson – 7 tackles, 4 assists, 1 sack

Hoping to increase their current winning streak the Rams flew to Ford Field for an NFC duel with the Lions. The Rams trailed early with kicker Jason Hanson making a 30-yard field goal, but the Rams replied with kicker Josh Brown making a 28-yard field goal. In the second quarter the Rams struggled as Hanson's kick was returned 105 yards to the endzone by WR Stefan Logan, followed by QB Shaun Hill making a 1-yard TD pass to WR Calvin Johnson. The Rams tried to cut the lead with Brown nailing another 28-yard field goal, but they continued to struggle when Hill found TE Brandon Pettigrew on a 3-yard TD pass and then in the 3rd quarter he found WR Nate Burleson on a 26-yard TD pass. In the fourth quarter the Rams had more problems when they gave up a 48 and a 47-yard field goal by Hanson and an interception by DB Alphonso Smith in which he returned 42 yards to the endzone for a touchdown.

With the loss, the Rams fell to 2–3.

==== Week 6: vs. San Diego Chargers ====
Week 6: San Diego Chargers at St. Louis Rams – Game summary

Quarter	1	2	3	4	Total
Chargers	0	3	7	7	17
Rams	10	7	0	3	20

at Edward Jones Dome, St. Louis, Missouri

- Date: October 17
- Game time: 12:00 pm. CDT
- Game weather: None (dome stadium)
- Game attendance: 52,472
- Referee: Scott Green
- TV announcers (CBS): Don Criqui and Steve Beuerlein
- Recap

Game information

First quarter

- STL – Josh Brown 39 yard field goal, Rams 3–0, Drive: 8 plays, 30 yards, 2:39.
- STL – Danario Alexander 38 yard pass from Sam Bradford (Josh Brown kick), Rams 10–0, Drive: 5 plays, 80 yards, 2:31.

Second quarter

- STL – Steven Jackson 7 yard run (Josh Brown kick), Rams 17–0, Drive: 17 plays, 67 yards, 7:58.
- SD – Nate Kaeding 41 yard field goal, Rams 17–3, Drive: 8 plays, 53 yards, 1:16.

Third quarter

- SD – Mike Tolbert 1 yard run (Nate Kaeding kick), Rams 17–10, Drive: 11 plays, 68 yards, 5:48.

Fourth quarter

- STL – Josh Brown 48 yard field goal, Rams 20–10, Drive: 8 plays, 32 yards, 4:15.
- SD – Buster Davis 5 yard pass from Philip Rivers (Nate Kaeding kick), Rams 20–17, Drive: 5 plays, 76 yards, 0:40.

Top passers

- SD – Philip Rivers – 22/37, 249 yards, 1 touchdown, 1 interception
- STL – Sam Bradford – 18/31, 198 yards, 1 touchdown

Top rushers

- SD – Ryan Mathews – 12 rushes, 64 yards
- STL – Steven Jackson – 29 rushes, 109 yards

Top receivers

- SD – Patrick Crayton – 6 receptions, 117 yards
- STL – Danario Alexander – 4 receptions, 72 yards, 1 touchdown

Top tacklers

- SD – Eric Weddle – 11 tackles, 1 assist
- STL – Bradley Fletcher – 7 tackles

The Rams' sixth game was an Interconference duel against the San Diego Chargers inside their dome. In the first quarter the Rams took the early lead as kicker Josh Brown made a 39-yard field goal, followed by QB Sam Bradford completing a 38-yard TD pass to WR Danario Alexander. The Rams increased their lead in the 2nd quarter when RB Steven Jackson got a 7-yard TD run. The Chargers replied with kicker Nate Kaeding nailing a 41-yard field goal, followed in the third quarter by FB Mike Tolbert getting a 1-yard TD run. In the 4th quarter the Rams' lead increased again when Josh Brown hit a 48-yard field goal, but was cut when QB Philip Rivers made a 5-yard TD pass to WR Buster Davis.

With the win, the Rams improved to 3–3 snapping their 13-game losing streak against AFC Opponents.

==== Week 7: at Tampa Bay Buccaneers ====
Week 7: St. Louis Rams at Tampa Bay Buccaneers – Game summary

Quarter	1	2	3	4	Total
Rams	0	17	0	0	17
Buccaneers	3	3	6	6	18

at Raymond James Stadium, Tampa, Florida

- Date: October 24
- Game time: 1:00 pm. EDT
- Game weather: 84 °F (29 °C) (Clear)
- Game attendance: 42,020
- Referee: Mike Carey
- TV announcers (Fox): Dick Stockton, Charles Davis, Jim Mora & Laura Okmin
- Recap

Game information

First quarter

- TB – Connor Barth 35 yard field goal, Buccaneers 3–0, Drive: 4 plays, −10 yards, 2:51.

Second quarter

- STL – Josh Brown 25 yard field goal, Tied 3–3, Drive: 13 plays, 72 yards, 5:50.
- STL – Danny Amendola 5 yard pass from Sam Bradford (Josh Brown kick), Rams 10–3, Drive: 11 plays, 80 yards, 5:18.
- STL – Michael Hoomanawanui 2 yard pass from Sam Bradford (Josh Brown kick), Rams 17–3, Drive: 8 plays, 45 yards, 3:41.
- TB – Connor Barth 39 yard field goal, Rams 17–6, Drive: 10 plays, 43 yards, 2:35.

Third quarter

- TB – Connor Barth 53 yard field goal, Rams 17–9, Drive: 11 plays, 60 yards, 6:09.
- TB – Connor Barth 38 yard field goal, Rams 17–12, Drive: 9 plays, 49 yards, 4:44.

Fourth quarter

- TB – Cadillac Williams 1 yard pass from Josh Freeman (run failed), Buccaneers 18–17, Drive: 16 plays, 81 yards, 4:35.

Top passers

- STL – Sam Bradford – 13/26, 126 yards, 2 touchdowns
- TB – Josh Freeman – 23/40, 212 yards, 1 touchdown

Top rushers

- STL – Steven Jackson – 22 rushes, 110 yards
- TB – LeGarrette Blount – 11 rushes, 72 yards

Top receivers

- STL – Steven Jackson – 2 receptions, 35 yards
- TB – Mike Williams – 5 receptions, 82 yards

Top tacklers

- STL – James Laurinaitis – 7 tackles, 1 assist
- TB – Barrett Ruud – 8 tackles, 3 assists

The Rams' seventh game was an NFC duel against the Buccaneers at Raymond James Stadium. In the first quarter, the Rams trailed early as kicker Connor Barth made a 35-yard field goal. They eventually pulled ahead in the 2nd quarter when kicker Josh Brown made a 25-yard field goal, followed by QB Sam Bradford making a 5 and a 2-yard TD pass to WR Danny Amendola and TE Michael Hoomanawanui respectively. The 49ers decreased the lead with Barth nailing a 39-yard field goal. This was followed by his successful 53 and 38-yard field goals to go 17–12. In the fourth quarter the Rams suddenly fell behind with QB Josh Freeman making a 1-yard TD pass to RB Cadillac Williams. (With a failed 2-point conversion)

With the loss, the Rams fell to 3–4.

==== Week 8: vs. Carolina Panthers ====
Week 8: Carolina Panthers at St. Louis Rams – Game summary

Quarter	1	2	3	4	Total
Panthers	0	3	0	7	10
Rams	0	10	0	10	20

at Edward Jones Dome, St. Louis, Missouri

- Date: October 31
- Game time: 12:00 pm. CDT
- Game weather: None (dome stadium)
- Game attendance: 52,281
- Referee: Carl Cheffers
- TV announcers (Fox): Dick Stockton, Charles Davis, Jim Mora & Laura Okmin
- Recap

Game information

First quarter

- No scoring plays

Second quarter

- STL – Josh Brown 33 yard field goal, Rams 3–0, Drive: 13 plays, 55 yards, 6:57.
- STL – Danny Amendola 2 yard pass from Sam Bradford (Josh Brown kick), Rams 10–0, Drive: 11 plays, 55 yards, 6:18.
- CAR – John Kasay 44 yard field goal, Rams 10–3, Drive: 7 plays, 43 yards, 1:30.

Third quarter

- No scoring plays

Fourth quarter

- STL – Daniel Fells 23 yard pass from Sam Bradford (Josh Brown kick), Rams 17–3, Drive: 5 plays, 43 yards, 2:44.
- STL – Josh Brown 41 yard field goal, Rams 20–3, Drive: 7 plays, 5 yards, 3:53.
- CAR – Brandon LaFell 17 yard pass from Matt Moore (John Kasay kick), Rams 20–10, Drive: 12 plays, 80 yards, 2:58.

Top passers

- CAR – Matt Moore – 23/37, 194 yards, 1 touchdown, 3 interceptions
- STL – Sam Bradford – 25/32, 191 yards, 2 touchdowns

Top rushers

- CAR – Jonathan Stewart – 14 rushes, 30 yards
- STL – Steven Jackson – 23 rushes, 59 yards

Top receivers

- CAR – Steve Smith – 9 receptions, 85 yards
- STL – Brandon Gibson – 6 receptions, 67 yards

Top tacklers

- CAR – Richard Marshall – 9 tackles
- STL – James Laurinaitis – 7 tackles, 1 assist, 1.0 sack, 1 interception

The Rams 8th game was an NFC duel with the Panthers inside their dome. In the second quarter the Rams took the lead as kicker Josh Brown nailed a 33-yard field goal. This was followed by QB Sam Bradford completing a 2-yard TD pass to WR Danny Amendola. The Panthers replied with kicker John Kasay making a 44-yard field goal. The Rams increased their lead in the fourth quarter with Bradford finding TE Daniel Fells on a 23-yard TD pass, followed by Brown getting a 41-yard field goal. The Panthers responded with QB Matt Moore making a 17-yard TD pass to WR Brandon LaFell.

With the win, the Rams went into their bye week at 4–4.

==== Week 10: at San Francisco 49ers ====
Week 10: St. Louis Rams at San Francisco 49ers – Game summary

Quarter	1	2	3	4	OT	Total
Rams	3	7	7	3	0	20
49ers	7	3	0	10	3	23

at Candlestick Park, San Francisco, California

- Date: November 14
- Game time: 1:15 pm. PST
- Game weather: 74 °F (23 °C) (Sunny)
- Game attendance: 69,732
- Referee: Ed Hochuli
- TV announcers (Fox): Sam Rosen, Tim Ryan and Chris Myers
- Recap

Game information

First quarter

- STL – Josh Brown 42 yard field goal, Rams 3–0, Drive: 8 plays, 54 yards, 5:25.
- SF – Frank Gore 1 yard run (Joe Nedney kick), 49ers 7–3, Drive: 3 plays, 66 yards, 1:39.

Second quarter

- SF – Joe Nedney 26 yard field goal, 49ers 10–3, Drive: 8 plays, 75 yards, 2:57.
- STL – Danny Amendola 5 yard pass from Sam Bradford (Josh Brown kick), Tied 10–10, Drive: 6 plays, 67 yards, 2:56.

Third quarter

- STL – Steven Jackson 13 yard run (Josh Brown kick), Rams 17–10, Drive: 7 plays, 64 yards, 3:22.

Fourth quarter

- SF – Joe Nedney 47 yard field goal, Rams 17–13, Drive: 7 plays, 44 yards, 2:45.
- SF – Michael Crabtree 16 yard pass from Troy Smith (Joe Nedney kick), 49ers 20–17, Drive: 6 plays, 76 yards, 2:02.
- STL – Josh Brown 33 yard field goal, Tied 20–20, Drive: 11 plays, 70 yards, 2:10.

Overtime

- SF – Joe Nedney 29 yard field goal, 49ers 23–20, Drive: 6 plays, 55 yards, 3:18.

Top passers

- STL – Sam Bradford – 30/42, 251 yards, 1 touchdown
- SF – Troy Smith – 17/28, 356 yards, 1 touchdown

Top rushers

- STL – Steven Jackson – 20 rushes, 81 yards, 1 touchdown
- SF – Frank Gore – 22 rushes, 87 yards, 1 touchdown

Top receivers

- STL – Brandon Gibson – 8 receptions, 72 yards
- SF – Delanie Walker – 4 receptions, 80 yards

Top tacklers

- STL – Craig Dahl – 10 tackles, 3 assists
- SF – Patrick Willis – 8 tackles, 3 assists, 1.0 sack, 1 forced fumble

Coming off their bye week the Rams flew to Candlestick Park for an NFC West rivalry match against the 49ers. In the first quarter the Rams took the lead with kicker Josh Brown making a 42-yard field goal. They trailed with RB Frank Gore getting a 1-yard TD run. This was followed in the second quarter by kicker Joe Nedney nailing a 26-yard field goal. The Rams fought back and took the lead with QB Sam Bradford completing a 5-yard TD pass to WR Danny Amendola. Followed in the third quarter by RB Steven Jackson getting a 13-yard TD run. The 49ers got the lead back with Nedney getting a 47-yard field goal, followed by QB Troy Smith making a 16-yard TD pass to WR Michael Crabtree. Te Rams tied the game with Brown making a 33-yard field goal. The decision was made at overtime when Nedney successfully put away a 29-yard field goal to give the Rams a loss, bringing their record down to 4–5.

==== Week 11: vs. Atlanta Falcons ====
Week 11: Atlanta Falcons at St. Louis Rams – Game summary

Quarter	1	2	3	4	Total
Falcons	3	13	7	11	34
Rams	7	3	7	0	17

at Edward Jones Dome, St. Louis, Missouri

- Date: November 21
- Game time: 3:05 pm. CST
- Game weather: None (dome stadium)
- Game attendance: 53,005
- Referee: Walt Anderson
- TV announcers (Fox): Sam Rosen and Tim Ryan
- Recap

Game information

First quarter

- STL – Michael Hoomanawanui 25 yard pass from Sam Bradford (Josh Brown kick), Rams 7–0, Drive: 3 plays, 52 yards, 1:12.
- ATL – Matt Bryant 42 yard field goal, Rams 7–3, Drive: 12 plays, 56 yards, 6:39.

Second quarter

- STL – Josh Brown 53 yard field goal, Rams 10–3, Drive: 10 plays, 58 yards, 3:59.
- ATL – Brian Finneran 12 yard pass from Matt Ryan (Matt Bryant kick), Tied 10–10, Drive: 4 plays, 47 yards, 1:47.
- ATL – Matt Bryant 29 yard field goal, Falcons 13–10, Drive: 7 plays, 43 yards, 2:45.
- ATL – Matt Bryant 24 yard field goal, Falcons 16–10, Drive: 11 plays, 62 yards, 4:54.

Third quarter

- STL – Brandon Gibson 13 yard pass from Sam Bradford (Josh Brown kick), Rams 17–16, Drive: 3 plays, 37 yards, 1:24.
- ATL – Justin Peelle 2 yard pass from Matt Ryan (Matt Bryant kick), Falcons 23–17, Drive: 8 plays, 58 yards, 4:59.

Fourth quarter

- ATL – Matt Bryant 21 yard field goal, Falcons 26–17, Drive: 14 plays, 73 yards, 7:06.
- ATL – Michael Turner 39 yard run (Matt Ryan – Roddy White pass), Falcons 34–17, Drive: 3 plays, 45 yards, 0:29.

Top passers

- ATL – Matt Ryan – 26/39, 253 yards, 2 touchdowns
- STL – Sam Bradford – 27/42, 233 yards, 2 touchdowns, 1 interception

Top rushers

- ATL – Michael Turner – 28 rushes, 131 yards, 1 touchdown
- STL – Steven Jackson – 11 rushes, 54 yards

Top receivers

- ATL – Roddy White – 9 receptions, 83 yards
- STL – Danny Amendonla – 8 receptions, 63 yards

Top tacklers

- ATL – Curtis Lofton – 7 tackles, 1 assist
- STL – James Laurinaitis – 8 tackles, 3 assists

Hoping to rebound from their loss to the 49ers the Rams played inside their dome for an NFC duel with the Falcons. In the first quarter the Rams took the lead after QB Sam Bradford making a 25-yard TD pass to TE Michael Hoomanawanui. The Falcons replied with kicker Matt Bryant hitting a 42-yard field goal. The Rams increased their lead when kicker Josh Brown hit a 53-yard field goal. The lead didn't last long after QB Matt Ryan completed a 12-yard TD pass to WR Brian Finneran, followed by Bryant nailing a 29 and a 24-yard field goal. The Rams tried to cut the lead with Bradford making a 13-yard TD pass to WR Brandon Gibson, but they struggled further as Ryan threw a 2-yard TD pass to TE Justin Peelle. This was followed in the fourth quarter by Bryant nailing a 21-yard field goal, and with RB Michael Turner getting a 39-yard TD run.

With the loss, the Rams fell to 4–6.

==== Week 12: at Denver Broncos ====
Week 12: St. Louis Rams at Denver Broncos – Game summary

Quarter	1	2	3	4	Total
Rams	7	19	7	3	36
Broncos	10	3	0	20	33

at INVESCO Field at Mile High, Denver, Colorado

- Date: November 28
- Game time: 2:15 p.m. MST
- Game weather: 45 °F (7 °C) (Mostly Cloudy)
- Game attendance: 72,736
- Referee: Bill Leavy
- TV announcers (Fox): Ron Pitts, John Lynch and Nischelle Turner
- Recap

Game information

First quarter

- DEN – Knowshon Moreno 4 yard run (Matt Prater kick), Broncos 7–0, Drive: 7 plays, 80 yards, 3:06.
- DEN – Matt Prater 49 yard field goal, Broncos 10–0, Drive: 9 plays, 49 yards, 2:53.
- STL – Michael Hoomanawanui 36 yard pass from Sam Bradford (Josh Brown kick), Broncos 10–7, Drive: 12 plays, 80 yards, 5:52.

Second quarter

- DEN – Matt Prater 40 yard field goal, Broncos 13–7, Drive: 9 plays, 58 yards, 4:05.
- STL – Billy Bajema 2 yard pass from Sam Bradford (Josh Brown kick), Rams 14–13, Drive: 13 plays, 80 yards, 6:42.
- STL – Billy Bajema 26 yard pass from Sam Bradford (kick failed, hlu), Rams 20–13, Drive: 4 plays, 71 yards, 1:15.
- STL – Josh Brown 28 yard field goal, Rams 23–13, Drive: 6 plays, 50 yards, 1:33.
- STL – Josh Brown 37 yard field goal, Rams 26–13, Drive: 4 plays, 4 yards, 0:33.

Third quarter

- STL – Kenneth Darby 1 yard run (Josh Brown kick), Rams 33–13, Drive: 5 plays, 31 yards, 2:05.

Fourth quarter

- DEN – Brandon Lloyd 41 yard pass from Kyle Orton (Matt Prater kick), Rams 33–20, Drive: 3 plays, 65 yards, 1:01.
- STL – Josh Brown 26 yard field goal, Rams 36–20, Drive: 8 plays, 67 yards, 4:04.
- DEN – Eddie Royal 16 yard pass from Kyle Orton (pass failed), Rams 36–26, Drive: 5 plays, 50 yards, 3:09.
- DEN – Brandon Lloyd 5 yard pass from Kyle Orton (Matt Prater kick), Rams 36–33, Drive: 8 plays, 59 yards, 1:51.

Top passers

- STL – Sam Bradford – 22/37, 308 yards, 3 touchdowns
- DEN – Kyle Orton – 24/41, 347 yards, 3 touchdowns

Top rushers

- STL – Steven Jackson – 29 rushes, 72 yards
- DEN – Knowshon Moreno – 12 rushes, 56 yards, 1 touchdown

Top receivers

- STL – Danario Alexander – 4 receptions, 95 yards
- DEN – Brandon Lloyd – 4 receptions, 76 yards, 2 touchdowns

Top tacklers

- STL – Craig Dahl – 6 tackles
- DEN – Jamal Williams – 5 tackles, 3 assists

Hoping to rebound from their loss to the Falcons the Rams flew to INVESCO Field at Mile High for an Inter-conference duel with the Broncos. In the first quarter the Rams trailed early as Knowshon Moreno got a 4-yard TD run, followed by kicker Matt Prater nailing a 49-yard field goal. They cut the lead down with QB Sam Bradford getting a 36-yard TD pass to TE Michael Hoomanawanui. The deficit increased as Prater made a 40-yard field goal. They pulled ahead with Bradford completing a 2 and a 26-yard TD pass to TE Billy Bajema, followed by kicker Josh Brown nailing a 28 and a 37-yard field goal. This was followed in the third quarter by RB Kenneth Darby getting a 1-yard TD run. The lead was narrowed with QB Kyle Orton making a 41-yard TD pass to Lloyd, but it was expanded after Brown got a 26-yard field goal. The Broncos tried to come back as Orton completed a 16 and a 5-yard TD pass to wide receivers Eddie Royal and Brandon Lloyd, but the Rams' defense held them on for the win.

With the win, the Rams improved to 5–6.

==== Week 13: at Arizona Cardinals ====
Week 13: St. Louis Rams at Arizona Cardinals – Game summary

Quarter	1	2	3	4	Total
Rams	3	6	7	3	19
Cardinals	6	0	0	0	6

at University of Phoenix Stadium, Glendale, Arizona

- Date: December 5
- Game time: 2:15 pm. MST
- Game weather: None (retractable roof closed)
- Game attendance: 61,874
- Referee: Clete Blakeman
- TV announcers (Fox): Chris Myers and Kurt Warner
- Recap

Game information

First quarter

- ARI – Jay Feely 45 yard field goal, Cardinals 3–0, Drive: 8 plays, 44 yards, 4:36.
- ARI – Jay Feely 41 yard field goal, Cardinals 6–0, Drive: 9 plays, 65 yards, 4:40.
- STL – Josh Brown 28 yard field goal, Cardinals 6–3, Drive: 10 plays, 59 yards, 5:02.

Second quarter

- STL – Josh Brown 52 yard field goal, Tied 6–6, Drive: 7 plays, 15 yards, 3:30.
- STL – Josh Brown 20 yard field goal, Rams 9–6, Drive: 12 plays, 65 yards, 3:11.

Third quarter

- STL – Steven Jackson 27 yard run (Josh Brown kick), Rams 16–6, Drive: 10 plays, 85 yards, 4:42.

Fourth quarter

- STL – Josh Brown 43 yard field goal, Rams 19–6, Drive: 7 plays, 16 yards, 3:09.

Top passers

- STL – Sam Bradford – 18/29, 187 yards, 1 interception
- ARI – Derek Anderson – 7/20, 93 yards, 1 interception

Top rushers

- STL – Steven Jackson – 28 rushes, 102 yards, 1 touchdown
- ARI – Tim Hightower – 15 rushes, 81 yards

Top receivers

- STL – Brandon Gibson – 6 receptions, 54 yards
- ARI – Steve Breaston – 3 receptions, 62 yards

Top tacklers

- STL – Craig Dahl – 7 tackles, 1.0 sack, 1 interception
- ARI – Paris Lenon – 7 tackles, 3 assists

The Rams' twelfth game was a division rivalry match against the Cardinals. The Rams trailed early as kicker Jay Feely got a 45 and a 41-yard field goal. They soon pulled ahead after kicker Josh Brown hit a 28, 52 and 20-yard field goal. This was followed in the third quarter by RB Steven Jackson getting a 27-yard TD run, and with Brown making a 43-yard field goal.

With the win, the Rams improved to 6–6. They have won as many games this year as they have for the past three years, only winning a total of 6 games 2007–2009.

==== Week 14: at New Orleans Saints ====
Week 14: St. Louis Rams at New Orleans Saints – Game summary

Quarter	1	2	3	4	Total
Rams	0	6	0	7	13
Saints	14	7	7	3	31

at Louisiana Superdome, New Orleans, Louisiana

- Date: December 12
- Game time: 3:05 pm. CST
- Game weather: None (dome stadium)
- Game attendance: 70,015
- Referee: Tony Corrente
- TV announcers (Fox): Dick Stockton, Charles Davis, Jim Mora & Laura Okmin
- Recap

Game information

First quarter

- NO – Marques Colston 5 yard pass from Drew Brees (Garrett Hartley kick), Saints 7–0, Drive: 13 plays, 72 yards, 6:35.
- NO – Marques Colston 17 yard pass from Drew Brees (Garrett Hartley kick), Saints 14–0, Drive: 12 plays, 61 yards, 6:26.

Second quarter

- STL – Josh Brown 38 yard field goal, Saints 14–3, Drive: 9 plays, 61 yards, 4:04.
- STL – Josh Brown 45 yard field goal, Saints 14–6, Drive: 6 plays, 30 yards, 1:06.
- NO – Malcolm Jenkins 96 yard interception return (Garrett Hartley kick), Saints 21–6.

Third quarter

- NO – Lance Moore 31 yard pass from Drew Brees (Garrett Hartley kick), Saints 28–6, Drive: 8 plays, 64 yards, 4:11.

Fourth quarter

- NO – Garrett Hartley 40 yard field goal, Saints 31–6, Drive: 10 plays, 38 yards, 4:07.
- STL – Sam Bradford 1 yard run (Josh Brown kick), Saints 31–13, Drive: 11 plays, 50 yards, 4:21.

Top passers

- STL – Sam Bradford – 18/32, 231 yards, 2 interceptions
- NO – Drew Brees – 25/40, 221 yards, 3 touchdowns, 2 interceptions

Top rushers

- STL – Steven Jackson – 16 rushes, 96 yards
- NO – Chris Ivory – 7 receptions, 47 yards

Top receivers

- STL – Brandon Gibson – 4 receptions, 67 yards
- NO – Lance Moore – 5 receptions, 70 yards, 1 touchdown

Top tacklers

- STL – Craig Dahl – 9 tackles, 1 interception
- NO – Jonathan Vilma – 7 tackles, 1 assist, 1.0 sack, 1 forced fumble

Coming off their win over the Cardinals the Rams flew to Louisiana Superdome for an NFC duel with the Saints. The Rams trailed early as QB Drew Brees completed a 5 and a 17-yard TD pass to WR Marques Colston. The Rams then got on the board as kicker Josh Brown hit a 38 and a 45-yard field goal. Soon, they had more problems as QB Sam Bradford threw an interception to FS Malcolm Jenkins which was returned 96 yards for a touchdown. This was followed by Bress completing a 31-yard TD pass to WR Lance Moore, followed by kicker Garrett Hartley nailing a 40-yard field goal. The Rams would cut the lead down with Bradford scrambling a yard for a touchdown.

With the loss, the Rams fell to 6–7.

==== Week 15: vs. Kansas City Chiefs ====
Week 15: Kansas City Chiefs at St. Louis Rams – Game summary

Quarter	1	2	3	4	Total
Chiefs	0	14	3	10	27
Rams	6	0	0	7	13

at Edward Jones Dome, St. Louis, Missouri

- Date: December 19
- Game time: 12:00 pm. CST
- Game weather: None (dome stadium)
- Game attendance: 55,669
- Referee: Ron Winter
- TV announcers (CBS): Ian Eagle and Dan Fouts
- Recap

Game information

First quarter

- STL – Josh Brown 37 yard field goal, Rams 3–0, Drive: 14 plays, 53 yards, 8:04.
- STL – Josh Brown 52 yard field goal, Rams 6–0, Drive: 4 plays, 2 yards, 1:28.

Second quarter

- KC – Leonard Pope 2 yard pass from Matt Cassel (Ryan Succop kick), Chiefs 7–6, Drive: 9 plays, 61 yards, 4:01.
- KC – Jamaal Charles 2 yard run (Ryan Succop kick), Chiefs 14–6, Drive: 9 plays, 59 yards, 4:00.

Third quarter

- KC – Ryan Succop 53 yard field goal, Chiefs 17–6, Drive: 12 plays, 48 yards, 4:42.

Fourth quarter

- KC – Ryan Succop 38 yard field goal, Chiefs 20–6, Drive: 5 plays, 34 yards, 2:31.
- STL – Steven Jackson 5 yard run (Josh Brown kick), Chiefs 20–9, Drive: 12 plays, 72 yards, 4:23.
- KC – Thomas Jones 2 yard run (Ryan Succop kick), Chiefs 27–9, Drive: 2 plays, 82 yards, 0:38.

Top passers

- KC – Matt Cassel – 15/29, 184 yards, 1 touchdown, 1 interception
- STL – Sam Bradford – 21/43, 181 yards, 2 interceptions

Top rushers

- KC – Jamaal Charles – 11 rushes, 126 yards, 1 touchdown
- STL – Steven Jackson – 19 rushes, 67 yards, 1 touchdown

Top receivers

- KC – Dwayne Bowe – 2 receptions, 53 yards
- STL – Danny Amendola – 7 receptions, 60 yards

Top tacklers

- KC – Derrick Johnson – 10 tackles, 3 assists
- STL – James Laurinaitis – 10 tackles, 1 assist

Hoping to rebound from their loss to the Saints the Rams played inside their dome for an interconference duel with the Chiefs. In the first quarter the Rams took the early lead as kicker Josh Brown nailed a 37 and a 52-yard field goal. They trailed with QB Matt Cassel throwing a 2-yard TD pass to TE Leonard Pope, which got worse as RB Jamaal Charles got a 2-yard TD run, followed by kicker Ryan Succop making a 53 and a 38-yard field goal. The Rams tried to break down the lead with RB Steven Jackson making a 5-yard TD run, but continued to struggle as RB Thomas Jones got a 2-yard TD run.

With the loss, the Rams fell to 6–8.

==== Week 16: vs. San Francisco 49ers ====
Week 16: San Francisco 49ers at St. Louis Rams – Game summary

Quarter	1	2	3	4	Total
49ers	0	14	0	3	17
Rams	9	3	3	10	25

at Edward Jones Dome, St. Louis, Missouri

- Date: December 26
- Game time: 12:00 pm. CST
- Game weather: None (dome stadium)
- Game attendance: 52,820
- Referee: Pete Morelli
- TV announcers (Fox): Kenny Albert, Daryl Johnston and Tony Siragusa
- Recap

Game information

First quarter

- STL – Steven Jackson 1 yard run (Josh Brown kick), Rams 7–0, Drive: 7 plays, 71 yards, 3:39.
- STL – Troy Smith tackled in end zone by James Hall for a Safety, Rams 9–0

Second quarter

- SF – Ted Ginn Jr. 78 yard punt return (Jeff Reed kick), Rams 9–7.
- STL – Josh Brown 43 yard field goal, Rams 12–7, Drive: 8 plays, 36 yards, 3:44.
- SF – Mike Crabtree 60 yard pass from Troy Smith (Jeff Reed kick), 49ers 14–12, Drive: 6 plays, 80 yards, 3:10.

Third quarter

- STL – Josh Brown 30 yard field goal, Rams 15–14, Drive: 8 plays, 29 yards, 2:51.

Fourth quarter

- STL – Laurent Robinson 3 yard pass from Sam Bradford (Josh Brown kick), Rams 22–14, Drive: 4 plays, 68 yards, 1:47.
- SF – Jeff Reed 47 yard field goal, Rams 22–17, Drive: 7 plays, 52 yards, 3:55.
- STL – Josh Brown 28 yard field goal, Rams 25–17, Drive: 4 plays, 2 yards, 1:50.

Top passers

- SF – Troy Smith – 7/19, 153 yards, 1 touchdown, 1 interception
- STL – Sam Bradford – 28/37, 292 yards, 1 touchdown

Top rushers

- SF – Brian Westbrook – 10 rushes, 40 yards
- STL – Steven Jackson – 24 rushes, 48 yards, 1 touchdown

Top receivers

- SF – Michael Crabtree – 6 receptions, 122 yards, 1 touchdown
- STL – Danario Alexander – 6 receptions, 99 yards

Top tacklers

- SF – Patrick Willis – 12 tackles, 1.0 sack, 1 forced fumble
- STL – James Hall – 6 tackles, 2 assists, 1.5 sack, 2 forced fumbles

Hoping to break a two-game losing streak the Rams played inside their dome for a division rivalry rematch against the 49ers. The Rams took the lead after RB Steven Jackson got a 1-yard TD run, followed by DE James Hall tackling 49ers quarterback Troy Smith for a safety. The lead was narrowed when Ted Ginn Jr. returned a punt 78 yards for a touchdown, but the Rams increased their lead slightly with kicker Josh Brown nailing a 43-yard field goal. They trailed for the first time with Smith completing a 60-yard TD pass to WR Michael Crabtree. They got the lead back with Brown getting a 30-yard field goal, followed by QB Sam Bradford getting a 3-yard TD pass to WR Laurent Robinson. The lead was narrowed with kicker Jeff Reed nailing a 30-yard field goal, but the Rams pulled away with Brown making a 28-yard field goal.

With the win, the Rams improved to 7–8.

==== Week 17: at Seattle Seahawks ====
Week 17: St. Louis Rams at Seattle Seahawks – Game summary

Quarter	1	2	3	4	Total
Rams	0	3	3	0	6
Seahawks	7	0	3	6	16

at Qwest Field, Seattle, Washington

- Date: January 2
- Game time: 7:20 pm. CST
- Game weather: 34 °F (1 °C) (Clear)
- Game attendance: 67,325
- Referee: Jerome Boger
- TV announcers (NBC): Al Michaels, Cris Collinsworth and Andrea Kremer

Game information

First quarter

- SEA – Mike Williams 4 yard pass from Charlie Whitehurst (Olindo Mare kick), SEA 7–0, Drive: 6 plays, 87 yards, 3:22.

Second quarter

- STL – Josh Brown 32 yard field goal, SEA 7–3, Drive: 13 plays, 83 yards, 6:15.

Third quarter

- STL – Josh Brown 27 yard field goal, SEA 7–6, Drive: 6 plays, 12 yards, 2:55.
- SEA – Olindo Mare 31 yard field goal, SEA 10–6, Drive: 12 plays, 62 yards, 5:55.

Fourth quarter

- SEA – Olindo Mare 31 yard field goal, SEA 13–6, Drive: 7 plays, 29 yards, 2:14.
- SEA – Olindo Mare 34 yard field goal, SEA 16–6, Drive: 13 plays, 47 yards, 7:05.

Top passers

- STL – Sam Bradford – 19/36, 155 yards, 1 interception
- SEA – Charlie Whitehurst – 22/36, 192 yards, 1 touchdown

Top rushers

- STL – Steven Jackson – 11 rushes, 45 yards
- SEA – Marshawn Lynch – 14 rushes, 53 yards

Top receivers

- STL – Steven Jackson – 4 receptions, 39 yards
- SEA – Ruvell Martin – 3 receptions, 85 yards

Top tacklers

- STL – David Vobora – 6 tackles, 5 assists
- SEA – David Hawthorne – 3 tackles, 4 assists

Coming off their win over the 49ers, the Rams flew to Qwest Field for a Week 17 NFC West rematch with the Seattle Seahawks, with the division title on the line. St. Louis trailed early in the first quarter as Seahawks quarterback Charlie Whitehurst completed a 4-yard touchdown pass to wide receiver Mike Williams. The Rams answered in the second quarter with a 32-yard field goal from kicker Josh Brown.

St. Louis chopped away as their deficit in the third quarter with a 27-yard field goal from Brown, but Seattle replied with kicker Olindo Mare making a 31-yard field goal. Afterwards, the Seahawks pulled away in the fourth quarter with Mare getting a 38-yard and a 34-yard field goal.

With the loss, the Rams' season came to an end at 7–9.

== Standings ==
NFC West
	W	L	T	PCT	DIV	CONF	PF	PA	STK
^{(4)} Seattle Seahawks	7	9	0	.438	4–2	6–6	310	407	W1
St. Louis Rams	7	9	0	.438	3–3	5–7	289	328	L1
San Francisco 49ers	6	10	0	.375	4–2	4–8	305	346	W1
Arizona Cardinals	5	11	0	.313	1–5	3–9	289	434	L1
