= Arnet =

Arnet may refer to:

== As a surname or given name ==
- Hugo Arnet (also spelled Arnot), Scottish advocate
- Jan Arnet, bass player for The Head Hunters
- Edward Arnet Johnson, American basketball player
- Josef Kalt (later known as Josef Kalt-Arnet), Swiss rower

== Other uses ==
- Arnet Pereyra Sabre II, aircraft
- ArnetMiner, software

== See also ==
- Arnett (name)
