= Eugene Sims =

American football player (born 1960)

Eugene R Sims
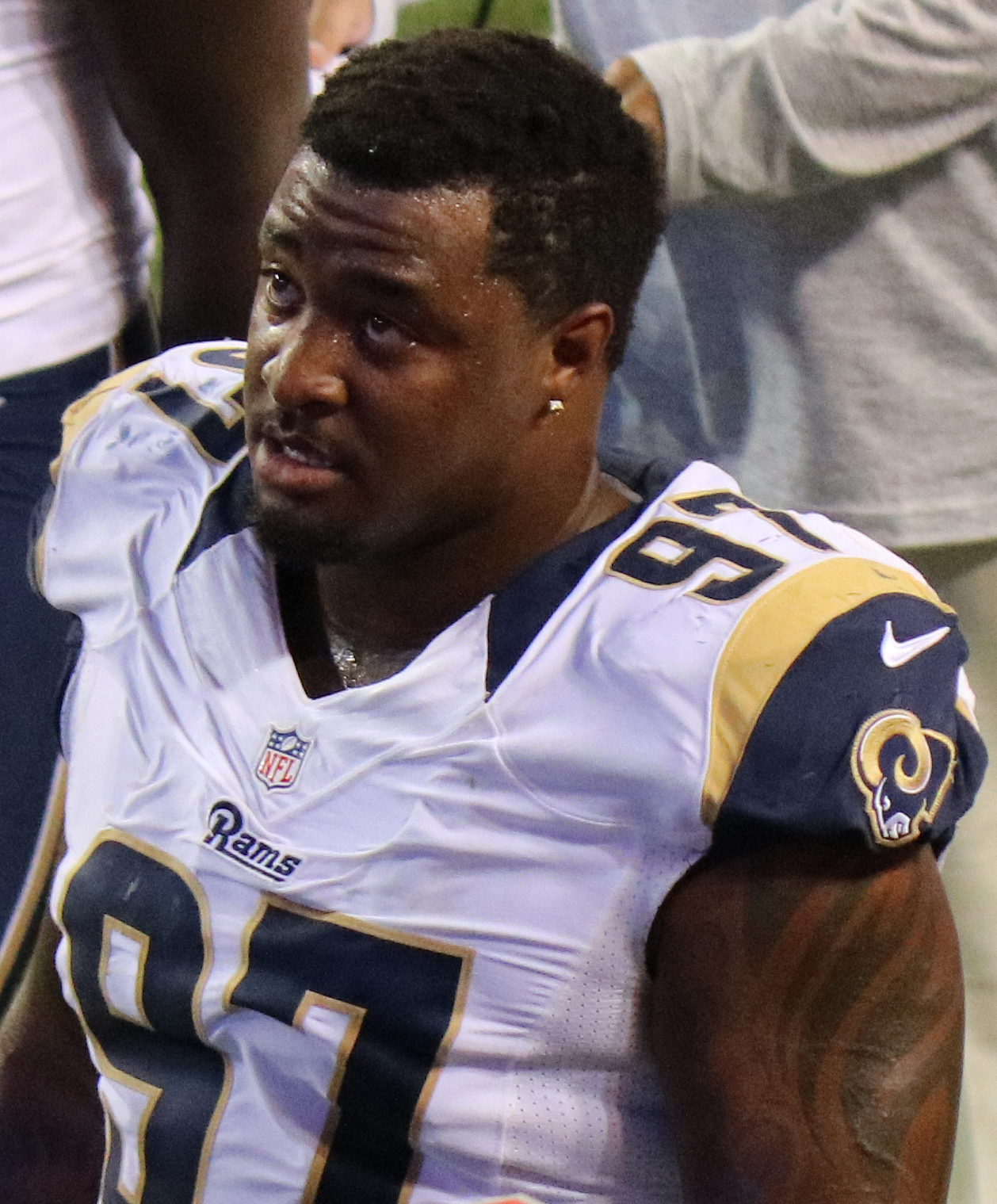
- Sims with the Los Angeles Rams in 2016

No. 92, 97
- Position: Defensive end

Personal information
- Born: March 18, 1986 (age 40); Hattiesburg, Mississippi, U.S.
- Listed height: 6 ft 6 in (1.98 m)
- Listed weight: 269 lb (122 kg)

Career information
- College: Jones County JC (2005–2007); West Texas A&M (2008–2009)
- NFL draft: 2010: 7th round, 226th overall pick

Career history
- St. Louis / Los Angeles Rams (2010–2016)

Awards and highlights
- First-team Small College All-American (2009)

Career NFL statistics
- Total tackles: 40
- Sacks: 12.5
- Forced fumbles: 1
- Fumble recoveries: 1
- Interceptions: 1
- Stats at Pro Football Reference

Eugene Sims (born March 18, 1986) is an American former professional football player who was a defensive end in the National Football League (NFL). He played college football for the West Texas A&M Buffaloes. He was selected by the St. Louis Rams in the seventh round of the 2010 NFL draft. After seven seasons with the organization, Sims was cut in 2017.

== Early life ==
Sims enjoyed a standout prep career at Mize Attendance Center in Mississippi competing in football as well as track and field. He graduated in May 2005.

== College career ==
=== Jones County Junior College ===
Sims began his college career at Jones County Junior College in Ellisville, Mississippi where he was second on the team as a sophomore in 2006 with 50 tackles, 30 of them solo, and a pair of forced fumbles. He was rewarded at season's end with an appearance in the MACJC All-Star game. Sims moved to the defensive line as a sophomore after being a two-game starter for the Bobcats at strong safety in 2005.

=== West Texas A&M ===
Sims transferred to West Texas A&M where he was recognized as Lone Star Conference Co-Defensive Lineman of the Year in 2008. Sims was the Buffs' starting defensive end in only 5 games and registered 10 tackles (10 solo, 10 assisted) and 13 tackles for losses and 10 sacks and eight hurries and two passes broken up.

As a senior in 2009 Sims was the Buffs' leading tackler among down linemen, recording 20 total tackles (10 solo, 10 assists). He also had a team-high 13.5 tackles for losses, as well as 7.0 sacks, five pass breakups, five quarterback hurries, two blocked kicks, three forced fumbles and one safety. Sims was named Lone Star Conference Defensive Lineman of the Year for a second consecutive season, as well as being a First-team All-LSC South Division selection. Sims also garnered AFCA small college All-America recognition in addition to being named AP Third-team Little All-America.

== Professional career ==
Pre-draft measurables
Height	Weight	40-yard dash	10-yard split	20-yard split	20-yard shuttle	Three-cone drill	Vertical jump	Broad jump	Bench press	Wonderlic
6 ft 4 5/8 in (1.95 m)	248 lb (112 kg)	4.69 s	1.61 s	2.72 s	4.38 s	6.90 s	32 1/2 in (0.83 m)	9 ft 6 in (2.90 m)	14 reps	x
All values from West Texas A&M Pro Day

Sims was selected in the seventh round by the St. Louis Rams. On June 28, 2010, Sims signed a four-year, $1.34 million contract including a $250,000 signing bonus. On September 5, 2010, Sims made the Rams 53-man roster. On September 3, 2013, the Rams signed Sims to a two-year extension through 2015. Sims re-signed with the Rams on a three-year, $10 million contract on March 13, 2016. On March 10, 2017, he was released by the Rams due to cap space.

== NFL career statistics ==
Legend
**Bold**	Career high

Year	Team	Games		Tackles					Interceptions					Fumbles			
Year	Team	GP	GS	Cmb	Solo	Ast	Sck	TFL	Int	Yds	TD	Lng	PD	FF	FR	Yds	TD
2010	STL	9	0	8	6	2	0.0	1	0	0	0	0	1	0	**1**	0	0
2011	STL	**16**	0	19	16	3	0.0	1	0	0	0	0	1	0	0	0	0
2012	STL	13	2	20	15	5	**3.0**	4	**1**	5	0	5	**2**	0	0	0	0
2013	STL	**16**	0	**27**	20	7	2.0	**6**	0	0	0	0	1	0	0	0	0
2014	STL	**16**	1	**27**	**22**	5	**3.0**	4	0	0	0	0	0	0	**1**	0	0
2015	STL	13	**9**	24	13	**11**	1.5	2	**1**	**42**	0	**42**	**2**	**1**	**1**	0	0
2016	LAR	**16**	8	25	18	7	2.5	**6**	0	0	0	0	1	0	**1**	0	0
Career		99	20	150	110	40	12.0	24	2	47	0	42	8	1	4	0	0
