= Arnette =

Arnette is both a given name and surname. Notable people with the name include:

- Arnette Lamb (1947–1998), American writer
- Damon Arnette (born 1996), American football player
- Jay Arnette (born 1938), American basketball player
- Jeannetta Arnette (born 1954), American actress

== See also ==
- Arnett (name)
