= Michael Hoomanawanui =

American football player (born 1988)

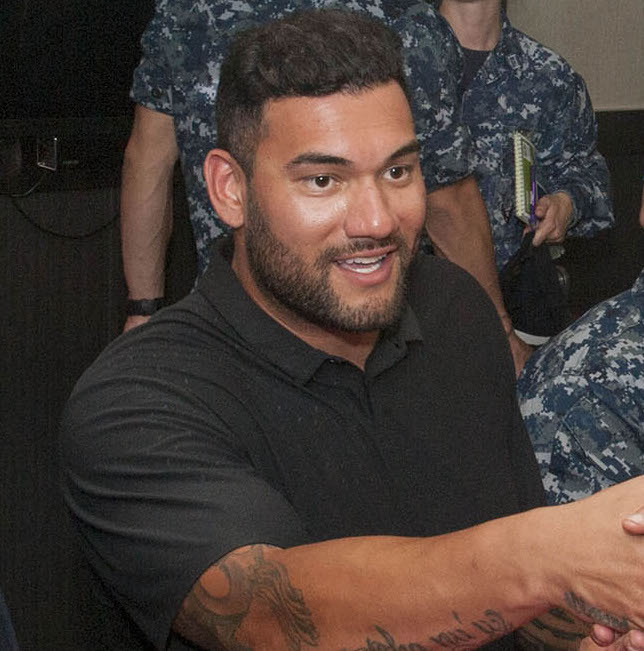
- Hoomanawanui in 2016

No. 86, 47, 84
- Position: Tight end

Personal information
- Born: July 4, 1988 (age 38); Bloomington, Illinois, U.S.
- Listed height: 6 ft 4 in (1.93 m)
- Listed weight: 265 lb (120 kg)

Career information
- High school: Central Catholic (Bloomington)
- College: Illinois
- NFL draft: 2010: 5th round, 132nd overall pick

Career history
- St. Louis Rams (2010–2011); Washington Redskins (2012)*; New England Patriots (2012–2015); New Orleans Saints (2015–2018)
- * Offseason or practice squad member only

Awards and highlights
- Super Bowl champion (XLIX)

Career NFL statistics
- Receptions: 57
- Receiving yards: 646
- Receiving average: 11.3
- Receiving touchdowns: 8
- Stats at Pro Football Reference

Michael Patrick Hoomanawanui (/ˌhoʊʔoʊməˌnɑːwɑːˈnuːi/ HOH-oh-mə-NAH-wah-NOO-ee; born July 4, 1988), nicknamed "Hoo Man" and "Uh-Oh", is an American former professional football player who was a tight end in the National Football League (NFL). He played college football for the Illinois Fighting Illini and was selected by the St. Louis Rams in the fifth round (132nd overall) of the 2010 NFL draft.

== Early life ==
Hoomanawanui is of Hawaiian, Italian, and Irish descent. He attended Epiphany Elementary and Junior High School and Central Catholic High School in Bloomington, Illinois. He was a Chicago Tribune and Chicago Sun-Times First-team All-State selection and a First-team All-Cornbelt Conference selection after making 50 receptions for 843 yards and 12 touchdowns as a senior. He led the team with 139 tackles and eight sacks on defense. Hoomanawanui also lettered in basketball during freshman, sophomore and junior years.

== College career ==
As a freshman, he played in 10 games, starting three at tight end. In 2007, he played in 11 games, starting five at tight end. As a junior, in 2008, he earned Honorable Mention All-Big Ten honors by both the media and coaches after playing in all 12 games and eight starts at tight end. He ended the season with 25 catches for 312 yards and two touchdowns. In the 2009 season Hoomanawanui played in eight games, starting five. He ended the season with 10 receptions for 114 yards.

== Professional career ==
Pre-draft measurables
| Height | Weight | 40-yard dash | 10-yard split | 20-yard split | 20-yard shuttle | Three-cone drill | Vertical jump | Broad jump | Bench press | Wonderlic |
|---|---|---|---|---|---|---|---|---|---|---|
| 6 ft 3 5/8 in (1.92 m) | 264 lb (120 kg) | 4.77 s | 1.67 s | 2.76 s | 4.52 s | 7.67 s | 32 1/2 in (0.83 m) | 9 ft 2 in (2.79 m) | 25 reps | x |
All values from Illinois Pro Day.

=== St. Louis Rams ===
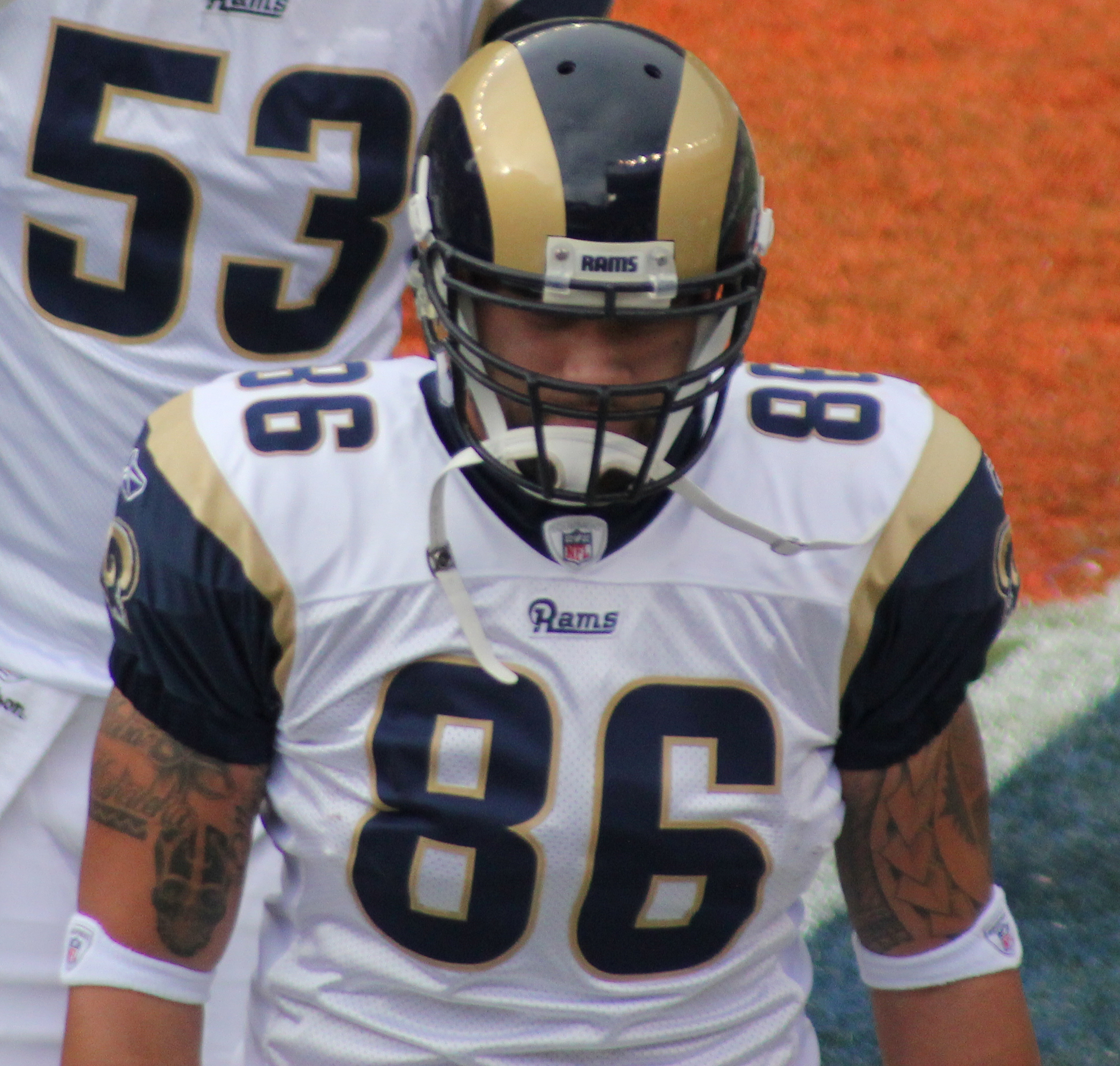
Hoomanawanui playing for the St. Louis Rams in 2010

He was selected by the St. Louis Rams in the fifth round of the 2010 NFL draft. On June 26, 2010, he signed a four-year, $2.4 million contract including a $215,000 signing bonus. During his rookie year in 2010, Hoomanawanui played 8 games (started three) making 13 receptions for 146 yards and three touchdowns. In 2011, he started eight games making seven catches for 83 yards. He was cut on September 2, 2012.

=== New England Patriots ===
On September 5, 2012, Hoomanawanui signed with the New England Patriots. During his first season with New England in 2012, Hoomanawanui played 14 games (started six) making five catches for 109 yards. He made his first career postseason start in the AFC Championship in a 28–13 loss against the Baltimore Ravens.

On April 15, 2013, Hoomanawanui signed his free agent tender to remain with the Patriots. During the 2013 year, Hoomanawanui appeared in 13 games (started 10), made 12 catches for 136 yards and a one-handed touchdown catch in a loss to the Miami Dolphins. His efforts helped the Patriots to the AFC Championship again, only to lose to the Denver Broncos, 26–16.

On March 10, 2014, it was announced Hoomanawanui re-signed with the Patriots for an additional two seasons. During the 2014 year, Hoomanawanui played 12 games (started six), made three catches for 44 yards.

Hoomanawanui earned his first Super Bowl appearance after the Patriots' 45–7 win over the Indianapolis Colts in the 2014 AFC Championship Game, where he had one reception for six yards. Before that, he recorded four catches for 43 yards in the team's 35–31 Divisional round victory over the Baltimore Ravens. During Super Bowl XLIX against the Seattle Seahawks, Hoomanawanui caught one pass for four yards in the first quarter. Hoomanawanui received his first career championship title as the Patriots won the Super Bowl, 28–24, over the Seahawks.

=== New Orleans Saints ===
On September 30, 2015, Hoomanawanui was traded to the New Orleans Saints in return for Saints defensive lineman Akiem Hicks. He mainly played at fullback and tight end in blocking situations, catching 11 passes for 76 yards and three touchdowns in his first season with the Saints.

On September 3, 2016, Hoomanawanui was placed on injured reserve.

In 2017, Hoomanawanui played in 14 games, recording six receptions for 52 yards and one touchdown.

On September 1, 2018, Hoomanawanui was placed on injured reserve with a neck injury.

=== NFL statistics ===
| Year | Team | GP | Rec | Yds | Avg | Y/G | Long | TD | 20+ | 40+ | FD | Fum |
|---|---|---|---|---|---|---|---|---|---|---|---|---|
| 2010 | STL | 8 | 13 | 146 | 11.2 | 18.2 | 36 | 3 | 2 | 0 | 9 | 0 |
| 2011 | STL | 8 | 7 | 83 | 11.9 | 10.4 | 27 | 0 | 1 | 0 | 4 | 0 |
| 2012 | NE | 14 | 5 | 109 | 21.8 | 7.8 | 41 | 0 | 2 | 1 | 4 | 0 |
| 2013 | NE | 13 | 12 | 136 | 11.3 | 10.5 | 19 | 1 | 0 | 0 | 7 | 0 |
| 2014 | NE | 16 | 3 | 44 | 14.7 | 2.8 | 23 | 0 | 1 | 0 | 2 | 0 |
| 2015 | NO | 12 | 11 | 76 | 6.9 | 6.3 | 19 | 3 | 0 | 0 | 4 | 1 |
| 2016 | NO | 0 | Did not play | | | | | | | | | |
| 2017 | NO | 14 | 6 | 52 | 8.7 | 3.7 | 25 | 1 | 1 | 0 | 2 | 0 |
| Career | | 85 | 57 | 646 | 11.3 | 7.6 | 41 | 8 | 7 | 1 | 32 | 1 |
