= Henry McCall (baseball) =

American baseball player

- First baseman
- Born: November 19, 1907; Ellisville, Mississippi, U.S.
- Died: December 5, 1998 (aged 91); Chicago, Illinois, U.S.
- Batted: Left Threw: Left

Negro league baseball debut
- 1936, for the Chicago American Giants

Last appearance
- 1945, for the Chicago American Giants

Teams
- Chicago American Giants (1936–1937); Indianapolis ABCs (1937); Birmingham Black Barons (1938); Chicago American Giants (1939, 1944–1945)

Henry McCall (November 19, 1907 – December 5, 1998), nicknamed "Butch", was an American Negro league first baseman in the 1930s and 1940s.

A native of Ellisville, Mississippi, McCall made his Negro leagues debut in 1936 with the Chicago American Giants. He played for Chicago again in 1937, as well as for the Indianapolis ABCs. After a stint with the Birmingham Black Barons in 1938, he returned to Chicago in 1939, and played there again in 1944 and 1945. McCall died in Chicago, Illinois in 1998 at age 91.
