= Bobby Shows =

American politician (1938–2019)

Member of the Mississippi House of Representatives from the 89th district
- In office January 1992 – July 2016
- Succeeded by: Donnie Scoggin

Personal details
- Born: August 28, 1938 Laurel, Mississippi, United States
- Died: January 20, 2019 (aged 80) Ellisville, Mississippi
- Party: Democratic (before 2010); Republican (2010-2019)
- Spouse: Sandra Odom
- Profession: Businessman

Clebern Hilburn "Bobby" Shows Jr. (August 28, 1938 – January 20, 2019) was an American Republican politician.

Shows went to the University of Southern Mississippi and was a businessman. From 1992 to 2016, served as member of the Mississippi House of Representatives from the 89th District.

He was a Democrat until 2010, when he switched affiliation to the Republican party, justifying by saying that “The majority leader, Mr. Ellis, (said) that you can see at this time that there is no room in the Democratic Party for white conservatives, so I am here to be a white conservative Republican.”
