= Donnie Scoggin =

American politician (born 1962)

Member of the Mississippi House of Representatives from the 89th district
- Incumbent
- Assumed office January 2017
- Preceded by: Bobby Shows

Personal details
- Born: August 12, 1962 (age 64) Ellisville, Mississippi, U.S.
- Party: Republican
- Spouse: Donna
- Children: 2
- Education: Jones County Junior College (ASN); University of Southern Mississippi (BSN); Mississippi University for Women (MSN)

Donnie Scoggin (born August 12, 1962) is an American politician and nurse practitioner serving as a member of the Mississippi House of Representatives from the 89th district. Elected in November 2016, he assumed office in January 2017.

== Early life and education ==
Scoggin was born in Ellisville, Mississippi in 1962. He earned an Associate of Science in Nursing from Jones County Junior College, a Bachelor of Science in Nursing from the University of Southern Mississippi, and a Master of Science in Nursing from the Mississippi University for Women.

== Career ==
Scoggin began his career as an orderly at the South Central Regional Medical Center (SCRMC). He has since worked as an EMT, clinical nurse educator, emergency room nurse, and family nurse practitioner at the SCRMC. Scoggin was elected to the Mississippi House of Representatives in November 2016 and assumed office in January 2017. Scoggin is also the vice chair of the House Universities and Colleges Committee. In 2019 and 2020, he was vice chair of the House Technology Committee.
