= Brandon Gibson =

American football player (born 1987)

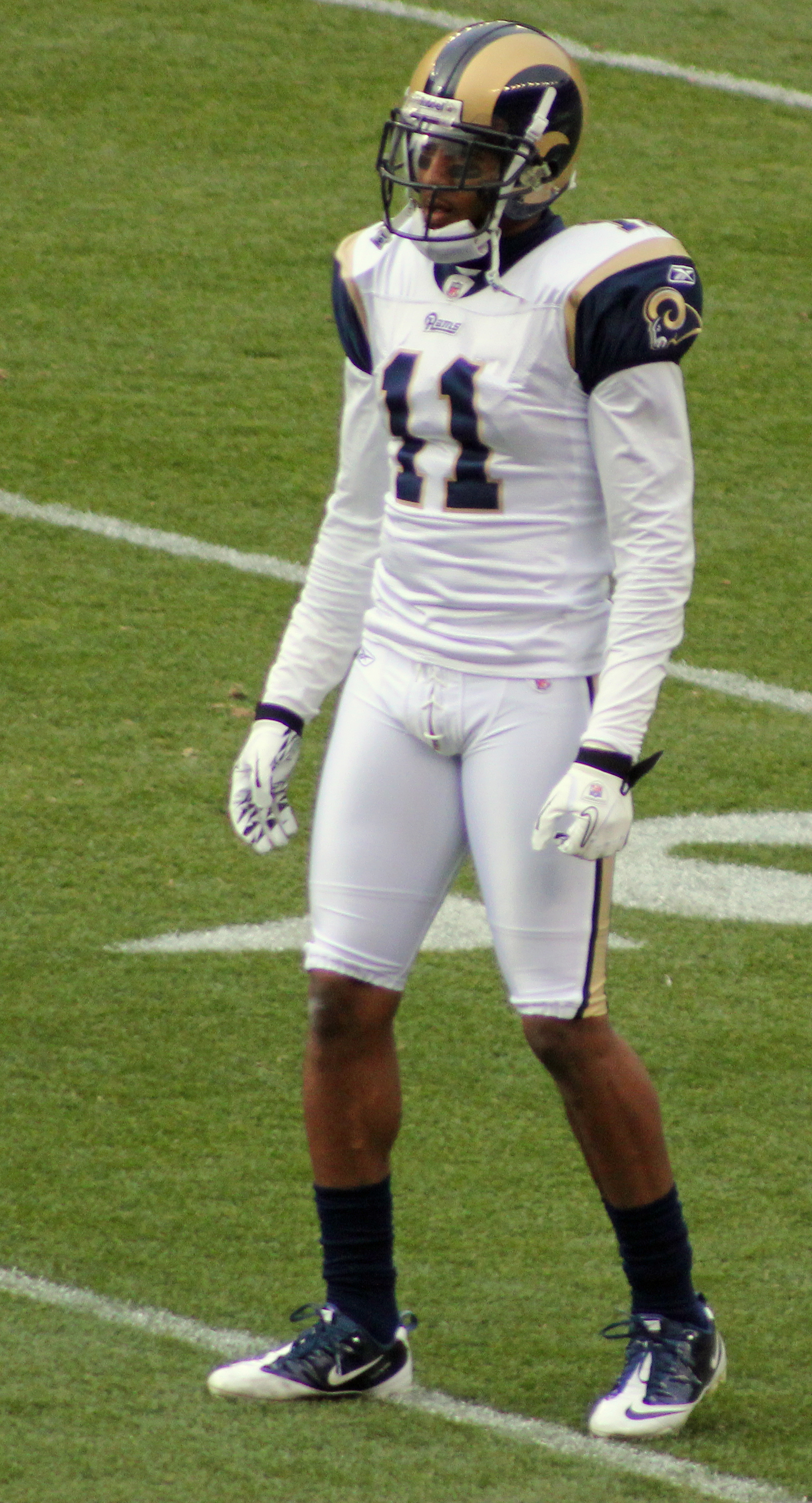
- Gibson with the St. Louis Rams in 2010

No. 19, 11, 10
- Position: Wide receiver

Personal information
- Born: August 13, 1987 (age 39); West Germany
- Listed height: 6 ft 0 in (1.83 m)
- Listed weight: 210 lb (95 kg)

Career information
- High school: John R. Rogers (Puyallup, Washington, U.S.)
- College: Washington State
- NFL draft: 2009: 6th round, 194th overall pick

Career history
- Philadelphia Eagles (2009); St. Louis Rams (2009–2012); Miami Dolphins (2013–2014); New England Patriots (2015)

Awards and highlights
- First-team All-Pac-10 (2007)

Career NFL statistics
- Receptions: 233
- Receiving yards: 2,711
- Receiving touchdowns: 13
- Stats at Pro Football Reference

Brandon Lewis Gibson (born August 13, 1987) is an American former professional football player who was a wide receiver in the National Football League (NFL). He played college football for the Washington State Cougars and was selected by the Philadelphia Eagles in the sixth round of the 2009 NFL draft. He also played for the St. Louis Rams and Miami Dolphins.

== Early life ==
Gibson grew up in Puyallup, Washington and went to Stahl Jr High School then graduated from Governor John R. Rogers High School in 2005.

== College career ==
Gibson finished his college career at Washington State as the school's all-time leading receiver with 2,756 yards and 182 receptions along with 17 touchdowns. He also played for the Washington State basketball team during the 2005-06 season, but decided to focus his attention on football.

In 2007, as a junior, Gibson started 11 games and was named to Phil Steele's Third-team All-America. Also, he was voted First-team All-Pac-10 honors. He set the WSU single-season record for receiving yards in a season with 1,180 on 67 receptions. He also led the team with nine touchdowns, a tie for third most touchdowns in a single season by a WSU Cougar. In 2006, he played in 12 games with no starts. He led the Cougars with 731 yards and was second on the squad in both receptions (49) and touchdowns (four). As a freshman, he earned a varsity letter after playing in 10 of the Cougars' 11 games during his debut season. Gibson ended the season with 9 catches for 172 yards (19.2 yard average) and 2 touchdowns.

Gibson seriously considered leaving Washington State to declare for the 2008 NFL draft due to the team switching coaches, however, the new coaching staff convinced him to stay.

As a senior in 2008, Gibson earned the fourth varsity letter of his career after starting in each of WSU's 13 games. He was named honorable mention All-Pacific-10 Conference and the team Offensive Most Valuable Player. In 2008, he caught 57 passes for 673 yards and two touchdowns. After the season, he received an invitation to play in the Senior Bowl.

== Professional career ==
=== Pre-draft ===
Gibson pulled his hamstring during the 2009 Senior Bowl in Mobile, Alabama.

Pre-draft measurables
Height	Weight	Arm length	Hand span	40-yard dash	10-yard split	20-yard split	20-yard shuttle	Three-cone drill	Vertical jump	Broad jump	Bench press
6 ft 0 3/8 in (1.84 m)	210 lb (95 kg)	32 in (0.81 m)	9 1/4 in (0.23 m)	4.59 s	1.63 s	2.65 s	4.54 s	6.94 s	34.0 in (0.86 m)	9 ft 5 in (2.87 m)	10 reps
All values from NFL Combine/Pro Day

=== Philadelphia Eagles ===
Gibson was selected by the Philadelphia Eagles in the sixth round of the 2009 NFL draft. He signed a four-year deal with Philadelphia on June 6, 2009.

After being inactive through the first two games of the 2009 season, Gibson played in his first NFL game on September 27 against the Kansas City Chiefs.

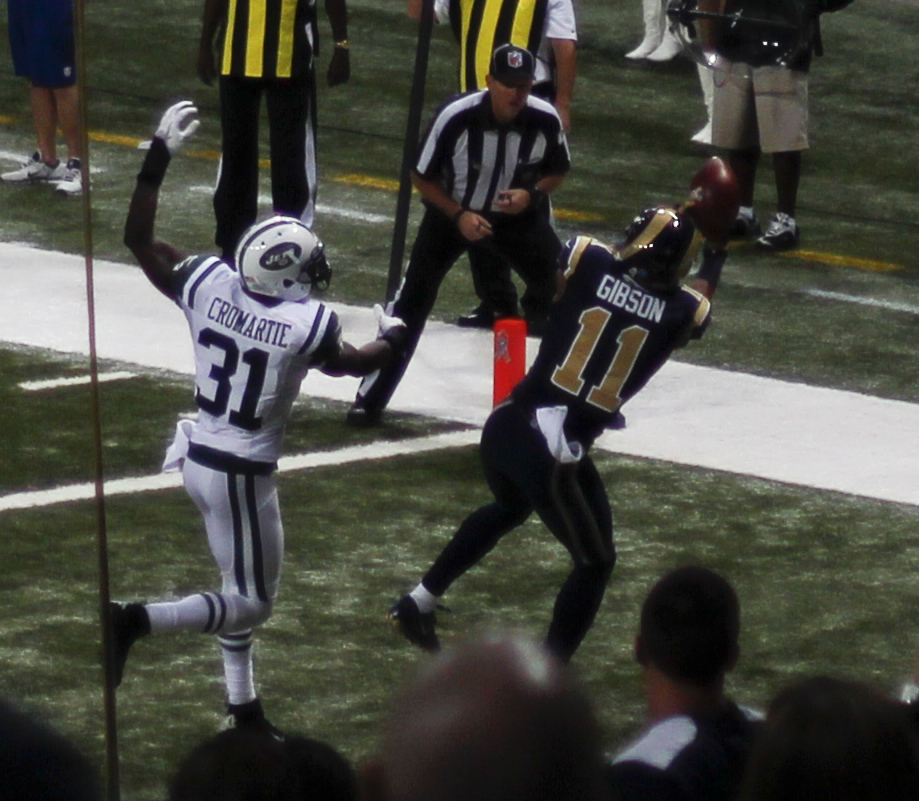
Gibson grabs a TD in 2012.

=== St. Louis Rams ===
Gibson was traded from Philadelphia to the St. Louis Rams on October 20, 2009 along with a fifth round draft pick in 2010 in exchange for linebacker Will Witherspoon. In his Ram debut, on November 15, 2009, he caught 7 passes for 93 yards, both Ram records for a rookie playing in his first game. The 93 yards was the most by any Ram receiver in 2009. His seven receptions in the game was also remarkable, as only teammate Danny Amendola had achieved that many receptions in a single game that season.

=== Miami Dolphins ===
On March 15, 2013, Gibson signed with the Miami Dolphins.

=== New England Patriots ===
On March 10, 2015, the New England Patriots signed Gibson to a one-year, $825,000 contract. Gibson was placed on injured reserve on August 24, 2015.

Gibson participated in The Spring League in 2017.

== NFL career statistics ==
Legend
**Bold**	Career high

Year	Team	Games		Receiving					
Year	Team	GP	GS	Tgt	Rec	Yds	Avg	Lng	TD
2009	PHI	1	0	0	0	0	0.0	0	0
2009	STL	9	4	69	34	348	10.2	23	1
2010	STL	14	12	**91**	**53**	620	11.7	41	2
2011	STL	15	9	71	36	431	12.0	34	1
2012	STL	**16**	**13**	82	51	**691**	**13.5**	34	**5**
2013	MIA	7	3	43	30	326	10.9	**46**	3
2014	MIA	14	5	51	29	295	10.2	40	1
Career		76	46	407	233	2,711	11.6	46	13
