= Lynching of John Hartfield =

African American who was lynched in the U.S.

John Hartfield was an African-American man who was lynched in Ellisville, Mississippi on June 26, 1919, for allegedly having a white girlfriend.

== History ==
John Hartfield left his home in Ellisville seeking a better life in East St. Louis. In 1919, he traveled back to Ellisville to visit his white girlfriend, Ruth Meeks, taking a job as a hotel porter in Laurel. When the relationship became known to some white men, they determined to kill Hartfield. They accused Hartfield of raping Meeks, whom they claimed was 18, although she was actually in her mid-twenties. Hartfield managed to elude them for a while, but they pursued him for several weeks.

Sheriff Allen Boutwell in Laurel raised donations to fund a hunting party with bloodhounds at the request of Sheriff Harbison. He was finally apprehended attempting to board a train on June 24, and was turned over to Sheriff Harbison, who placed him in the charge of a deputy and left town. The deputy immediately released him to a mob.

The Jackson Daily News, the New Orleans States, and other newspapers ran headlines that "John Hartfield will be lynched by Ellisville mob at 5:00 this afternoon" and additional text that, "The officers have agreed to turn him over to the people of the city at 5 o'clock this afternoon when it is expected he will be burned". Hartfield had been wounded, so a white doctor, A. J. Carter, treated his wounds to keep him alive long enough to be murdered. At 5:00 PM on June 26, 1919, a large cheering crowd assembled to watch the lynching of Hartfield. Theodore Bilbo, the governor of Mississippi, took no action.

Hartfield was hanged in a tall sweet gum tree, then his body was riddled with at least 2000 bullets. His body was then brought to the ground where men cut up the corpse for souvenirs, finally burning what remained. Afterward, commemorative postcards of the lynching were printed and sent out. A story circulated among whites that Hartfield had been hanged from the very same tree where the confederates had hanged three insurgents in the civil war. Governor Bilbo declared, "This is a white man's country, with a white man's civilization and any dream on the part of the Negro race to share social and political equality will be shattered in the end."

Days later, a Black man in Perry County was murdered by a mob because he mentioned Hartfield's death.

In the 1920s, Ho Chi Minh cited the treatment of Hartsfield in his Selected Works.
