= Kenneth Darby =

American football player (born 1982)

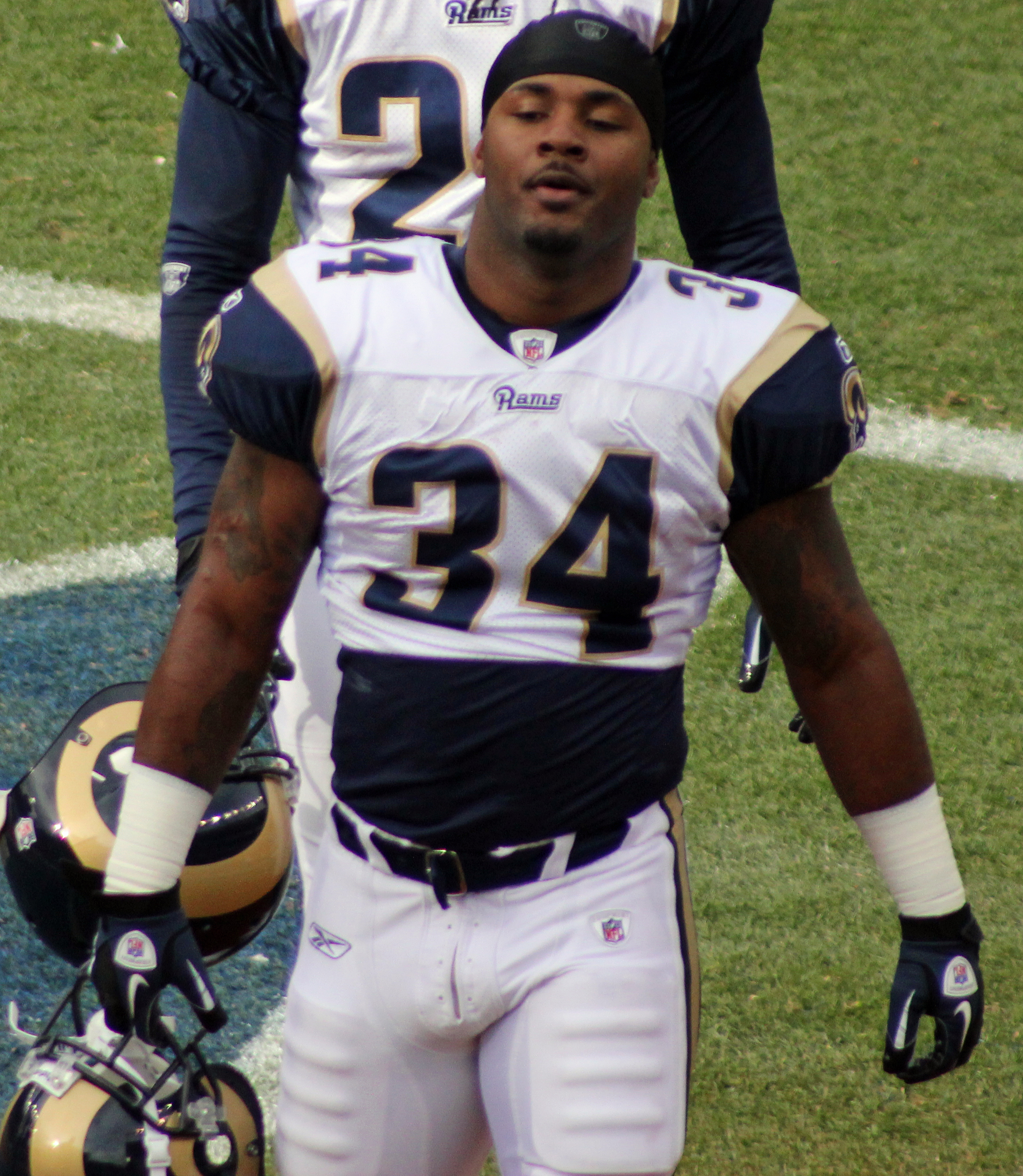
- Darby at a game in Denver in November 2010

No. 33, 34
- Position: Running back

Personal information
- Born: December 26, 1982 (age 43); Huntsville, Alabama, U.S.
- Listed height: 5 ft 10 in (1.78 m)
- Listed weight: 219 lb (99 kg)

Career information
- High school: Butler (Huntsville)
- College: Alabama
- NFL draft: 2007: 7th round, 246th overall pick

Career history
- Tampa Bay Buccaneers (2007); Atlanta Falcons (2008)*; St. Louis Rams (2008–2010)
- * Offseason or practice squad member only

Awards and highlights
- First-team All-SEC (2005); Second-team All-SEC (2004)

Career NFL statistics
- Rushing yards: 408
- Rushing average: 4.3
- Rushing touchdowns: 2
- Receptions: 49
- Receiving yards: 356
- Receiving touchdowns: 1
- Stats at Pro Football Reference

Kenneth Darby (born December 26, 1982) is an American former professional football player who was a running back in the National Football League (NFL). He played college football for the Alabama Crimson Tide. He was selected by the Tampa Bay Buccaneers in the seventh round of the 2007 NFL draft. Darby was also a member of the Atlanta Falcons and St. Louis Rams.

== Early life ==
Darby attended S. R. Butler High School in Huntsville, Alabama. He rushed for 4,674 yards during his prep career and amassed 1,591 yards and 20 touchdowns as a senior, when he also had 2,367 all-purpose yards and scored 24 times. As an outside linebacker, he recorded 77 tackles his final campaign, giving him 281 tackles in his career.

== College career ==
Darby played his college ball at the University of Alabama. In 2002, he redshirted as a freshman. He first saw action his freshman year in 2003 under former coach Mike Shula. He played sparingly behind former running backs Shaud Williams and Ray Hudson. He had 185 yards on 34 carries (5.4 avg.) and also caught three passes in the 10 games he played (one start).

With the graduation of Shaud Williams and starter Ray Hudson falling to injury, Darby saw extensive action in 2004. Taking over the starting running back job five games into the season, Darby rushed for over 1,100 yards. Due an injury at the end of the season, Darby was unable to play in the Music City Bowl. The Tide finished with a 6–6 record. Darby was a Second-team All-SEC selection after playing 12 games with five starts. He logged 219 carries for 1,062 yards (4.8 avg.) and a career-high eight touchdowns and had 15 receptions for 74 yards (4.9 avg.) and one score.

Darby entered 2005 as a preseason All-SEC player and finished the season as one of the top running backs in the SEC. That year, the Crimson Tide finished 10-2 with a victory over Texas Tech in the Cotton Bowl Classic. He was a First-team All-SEC after starting all 12 games, with 239 carries for a career-high 1,242 yards (5.2 avg.) and three touchdowns and had 29 catches for 132 yards (4.6 avg.).

Darby entered his senior season needing just over 1,000 yards rushing to surpass Shaun Alexander as Alabama's career rushing leader. He rushed for over 800 yards and finished the season without a rushing touchdown. The Crimson Tide finished 6-6 with a loss to Oklahoma State in the Independence Bowl. In 2006 Darby was a Second-team All-SEC selection by The NFL Draft Report. He started all 13 games carrying 210 times for 835 yards (4.0 avg.) and caught 23 passes for 130 yards (5.7 avg.) and one score. After the season, Darby was selected to play in the Senior Bowl.

== Professional career ==
Pre-draft measurables
Height	Weight	Arm length	Hand span	40-yard dash	10-yard split	20-yard split	20-yard shuttle	Three-cone drill	Vertical jump	Broad jump	Bench press
5 ft 10 3/8 in (1.79 m)	211 lb (96 kg)	30 1/2 in (0.77 m)	9 in (0.23 m)	4.61 s	1.58 s	2.65 s	4.38 s	6.99 s	30.0 in (0.76 m)	9 ft 0 in (2.74 m)	19 reps
All values from NFL Combine/Pro Day.

=== Tampa Bay Buccaneers ===
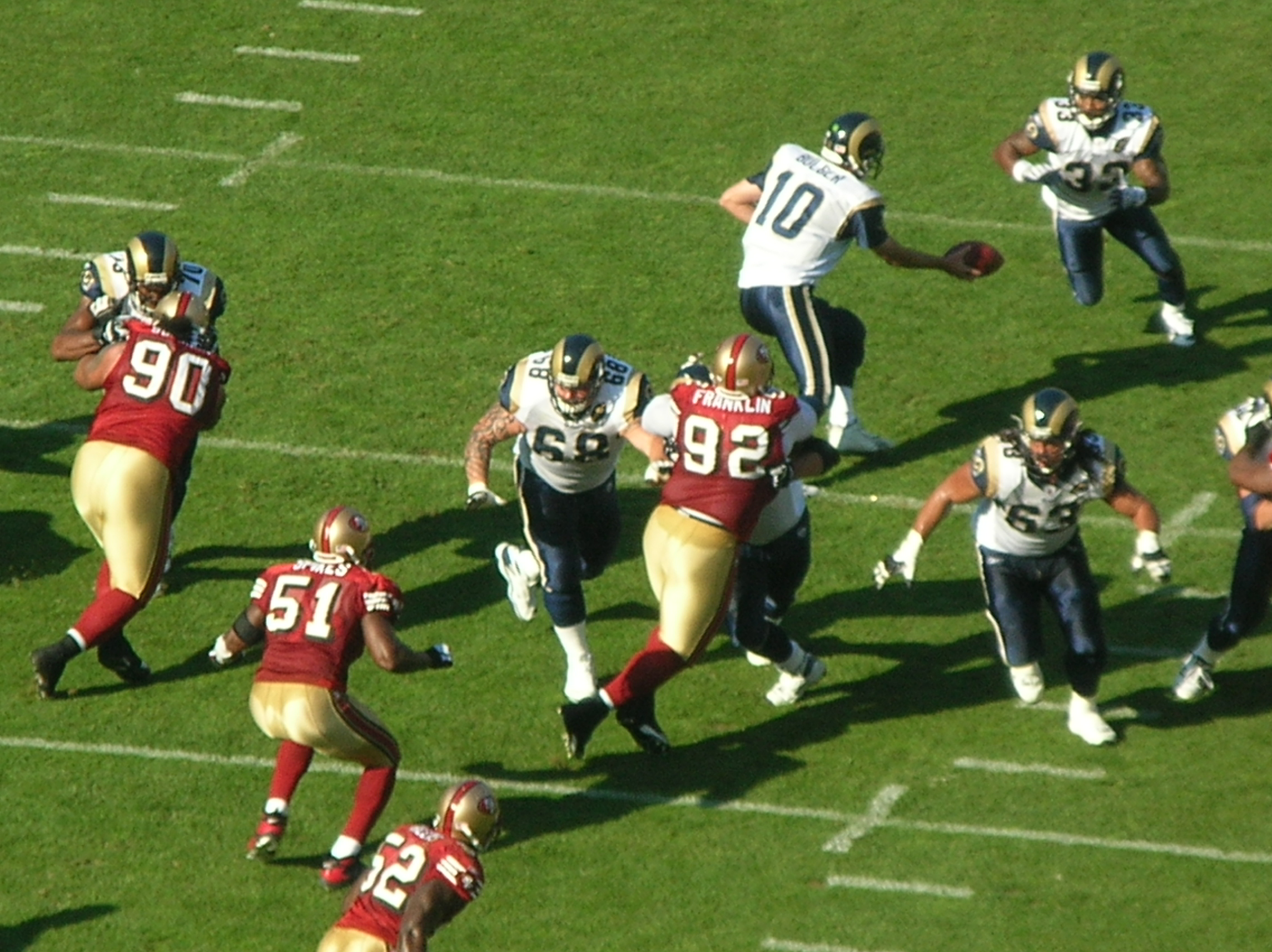
Darby takes the handoff from Rams quarterback Marc Bulger during a game against the San Francisco 49ers on November 16.

Darby was selected by the Tampa Bay Buccaneers in the seventh round with the 246th overall pick. He was waived by the Buccaneers during final cuts on August 30, 2008.

=== Atlanta Falcons ===
On September 1, 2008, Darby was signed to the practice squad of the Atlanta Falcons. He remained there the first six weeks of the season.

=== St. Louis Rams ===
Darby was signed to the St. Louis Rams' active roster from the Falcons' practice squad on October 14, 2008, after running back Brian Leonard was placed on injured reserve. Darby was also named the starter for the Rams' week 10 game with Steven Jackson being out for the game. During a game against the San Francisco 49ers, Darby caught a pass and was struck by Umpire Garth DeFelice who was trying to protect himself. Darby ended the 2008 NFL season with 32 carries for 140 yards (4.4 average) and 19 receptions for 183 yards (9.6) average and one touchdown.
