= Arnett (name) =

- Gender: masculine

Origin
- Origin: Old French
- Meaning: Little eagle

Other names
- Related names: Arnat, Arnet, Arnot, Arnott, Ornet, Ornette

Arnett is both a surname and a given name. Notable people with the name include:

Surname:

- Benjamin W. Arnett (1838–1906), American educator, bishop, and elected official
- Chuck Arnett (1928–1988), American dancer
- Jeffrey Jensen Arnett (born 1957), American psychologist
- Jon Arnett (1935–2021), American football player
- Kaylea Arnett (born 1993), American diver
- Peter Arnett (1934–2025), New Zealand-American journalist
- Ross H. Arnett Jr. (1919–1999), American entomologist
- Ulysses N. Arnett, American politician from West Virginia
- W. David Arnett (born 1940), American astrophysicist
- Will Arnett (born 1970), Canadian actor
- William Arnett (1939–2020), American writer and art collector

Given name:

- Arnett "Ace" Mumford (1898–1962), American football coach
- Arnett Cobb (1918–1989), American jazz saxophonist
- Arnett Howard (born 1959), American jazz musician
- Arnett Moultrie (born 1990), American basketball player
- Arnett Nelson (1892–1959), American jazz musician
