= Arnett Nelson =

American jazz musician

- Also known as: King Mutt
- Born: March 8, 1892; Ellisville, Mississippi, U.S.
- Origin: Laurel, Mississippi, U.S.
- Died: March 14, 1959 (aged 67); Chicago, Illinois, U.S.
- Genres: Jazz, blues
- Instrument(s): Clarinet, alto saxophone

Arnett Nelson (March 8, 1892 – March 14, 1959), sometimes credited as King Mutt, was an American jazz and blues musician who played clarinet or alto saxophone on many recordings made in Chicago in the 1920s and 1930s.

== Early life ==
He was born in Ellisville, Mississippi, and grew up in nearby Laurel.

== Career ==
Nelson served in World War I, and then played professionally in a band led by John Collins, the father of Lee Collins. Lee Collins described Nelson as a musician with a "weird style", who "liked to do tricks with his clarinet. He would take it all apart and play it." His first known recordings were in Chicago in 1923, as a member of Jimmy Wade's Moulin Rouge Orchestra. While with Wade, Nelson wrote "Buddy's Habit" with Charley Straight. The tune was recorded by King Oliver's Jazz Band with a notable solo by Louis Armstrong, and later by many other musicians

Although the extent of his involvement on sessions in the late 1920s is uncertain, he certainly played with Wade on sessions with singers Victoria Spivey and Perry Bradford, and in 1928 with cornettist Punch Miller and pianist Alex Hill. The following year, he played on sessions with female impersonator Frankie "Half Pint" Jaxon. In the mid-1930s he led his own Hot Four quartet, which comprised guitarist Big Bill Broonzy, steel guitarist Casey Bill Weldon, pianist Black Bob, and bass player Bill Settles. They were sometimes credited as King Mutt and His Tennessee Thumpers.

As a session musician, Nelson played on many blues recordings in Chicago in the 1930s, including records by Sweet Pease Spivey, Lil Johnson, Tampa Red, Bumble Bee Slim, Washboard Sam, Red Nelson, and the Washboard Rhythm Kings. On one 1936 recording by the State Street Swingers, bandleader Leonard Scott is heard to comment: "What's that you're doing, Arnett? I never heard nobody do that before."

== Personal life ==
After 1940, Nelson's dependence on alcohol led to him to withdraw from a public career. He died in Chicago in 1959, aged 67.
