= Ellisville, Mississippi =

City in Mississippi, United States

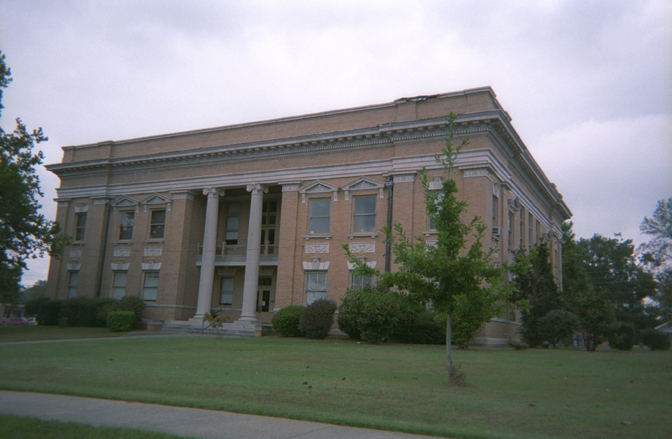
- Jones County courthouse in Ellisville

- Flag

- Location of Ellisville in Mississippi

- Location in the United States
- Coordinates: 31°36′4″N 89°12′8″W
- List of countries: United States
- State: Mississippi
- County: Jones

Government
  - Type: City
  - Mayor: Lynn Buckhaults

Area
  - Total: 10.55 sq mi (27.32 km^{2})
  - Land: 10.44 sq mi (27.04 km^{2})
  - Water: 0.11 sq mi (0.28 km^{2})
- Elevation: 253 ft (77 m)

Population (2020)
  - Total: 4,652
  - Density: 445.6/sq mi (172.05/km^{2})
- Time zone: UTC-6 (Central (CST))
  - Summer (DST): UTC-5 (CDT)
- ZIP code: 39437
- Area codes: 601, 769
- FIPS code: 28-22020
- GNIS feature ID: 0669746
- Website: cityofellisvillems.com

Ellisville is a town in and the first county seat of Jones County, Mississippi, United States. As of the 2020 census, Ellisville had a population of 4,652. The Jones County Courthouse is located here, as is much of the county government.

The state legislature authorized a second county seat at Laurel, to the northeast, which developed as the center of lumber and textile mills, with a much larger population. Ellisville is part of the Laurel micropolitan statistical area.

== History ==
The town is named for Powhatan Ellis, a former U.S. senator for Mississippi who identified as a descendant of Pocahontas and her father, Chief Powhatan in Virginia. Ellisville was designated as the county seat, and it became the major commercial and population center of Jones County through the early decades of development in the nineteenth century.

During the Civil War, Ellisville and Jones County were a center of pro-Union resistance. The county had mostly yeomen farmers and cattle herders, who were not slaveholders. Slaves constituted 12% of the county's population in 1860, the lowest proportion of slaves of any county in the state in 1860, as conditions generally did not support cultivation of large cotton plantations. Many local men resented going to war to support slaveholders, and worried about the survival of their families, where women and children worked to keep subsistence farms going. They resented Confederate tax collectors who took the goods and stores their families needed to live.

Confederate deserters and refugee slaves formed a resistance group known as the Knight Company, led by Newton Knight, First Lieutenant Jasper Collins, and Second Lieutenant William Wesley Sumrall. They were known to take refuge in a swamp along the Leaf River. Along with as many as 100 other Southern men, they fought several skirmishes with Confederate tax men, then other Confederate units eventually sent to crush the resistance. In 1864 they took control in Ellisville, raising the United States flag over the courthouse in place of the Confederate flag.

In 1919, Ellisville hosted one of the most gruesome lynchings in history, when a black man, John Hartfield was found to have a white girlfriend. A story was concocted about a rape, and Hartfield was captured by law enforcement. The Jackson Daily News ran headlines that "John Hartfield will be lynched by Ellisville mob at 5:00 this afternoon", and that a crowd of thousands was expected to attend. A crowd of around 10,000 came to watch Hartfield hanged from a tree, then shot repeatedly. When his body was cut down, pieces were cut off for souvenirs and what remained was burned. Commemorative postcards were printed.

In the late 19th and early 20th centuries, Ellisville lost primacy to nearby Laurel, which became a center of the timber industry and cotton textile mills. Its population in the mid-20th century was nearly six times that of Ellisville. Laurel has attracted other industries and is the center of a micropolitan statistical area comprising all of Jones County and Jasper County. The Jones County Sheriff's Department is based in Laurel, but the county government is still based in Ellisville, at the Jones County Courthouse.

Ellisville reflects the demographics of the county and is majority white. Laurel is majority African American in population, reflecting the migration of agricultural workers to the city for industrial and urban jobs.

== Geography ==
Ellisville is located in central Jones County at 31°36′4″N 89°12′8″W (31.601068, −89.202123). U.S. Route 11 runs through the center of town, while Interstate 59 runs through the northwest side, with access from Exits 85, 88, and 90. Both highways lead northeast 8 miles (13 km) to Laurel and southwest 22 miles (35 km) to Hattiesburg. Mississippi Highway 29 crosses US-11 near the center of town, leading northwest 12 miles (19 km) to Soso and southeast 20 miles (32 km) to Runnelstown.

According to the United States Census Bureau, Ellisville has a total area of 10.6 square miles (27.5 km^{2}), of which 0.12 square miles (0.3 km^{2}), or 1.01%, are water.

== Demographics ==
Historical population
Census	Pop.	Note	%±
1880	37		—
1890	967		2,513.5%
1900	1,899		96.4%
1910	2,446		28.8%
1920	1,681		−31.3%
1930	2,127		26.5%
1940	2,607		22.6%
1950	3,579		37.3%
1960	4,592		28.3%
1970	4,643		1.1%
1980	4,652		0.2%
1990	3,634		−21.9%
2000	3,465		−4.7%
2010	4,448		28.4%
2020	4,652		4.6%
U.S. Decennial Census

=== 2020 census ===
As of the 2020 census, Ellisville had a population of 4,652. The median age was 30.5 years. 18.8% of residents were under the age of 18 and 14.5% were 65 years of age or older. For every 100 females there were 92.8 males, and for every 100 females age 18 and over there were 90.6 males age 18 and over.

There were 1,319 households in Ellisville, including 810 families. Of all households, 32.5% had children under the age of 18, 34.5% were married-couple households, 19.9% were households with a male householder and no spouse or partner present, and 37.7% were households with a female householder and no spouse or partner present. About 33.1% of all households were made up of individuals, and 12.9% had someone living alone who was 65 years of age or older.

There were 1,501 housing units, of which 12.1% were vacant. The homeowner vacancy rate was 1.2% and the rental vacancy rate was 11.4%. In addition, 83.9% of residents lived in urban areas, while 16.1% lived in rural areas.

Ellisville racial composition as of 2020
Race	Num.	Perc.
White (non-Hispanic)	2,502	53.78%
Black or African American (non-Hispanic)	1,722	37.02%
Native American	12	0.26%
Asian	24	0.52%
Pacific Islander	2	0.04%
Other/Mixed	92	1.98%
Hispanic or Latino	298	6.41%

== Education ==
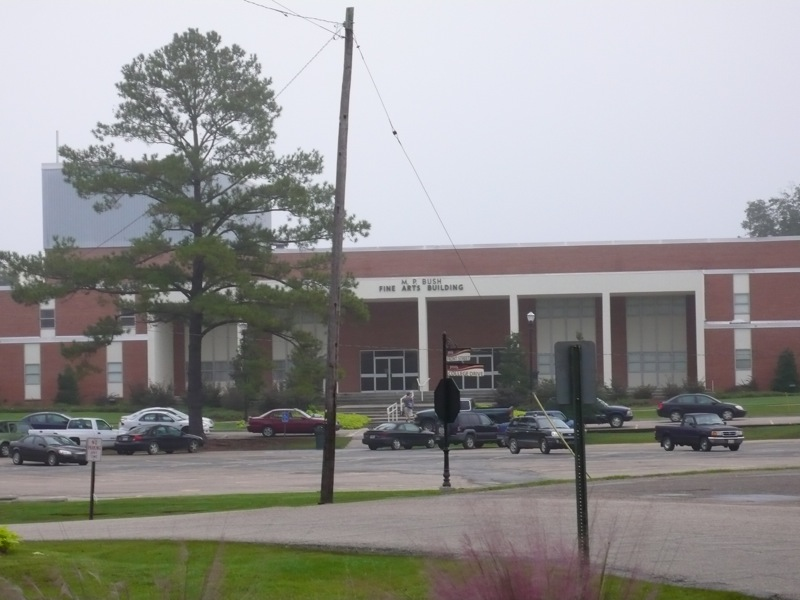
Jones County Junior College

Ellisville is served by the Jones County School District, and is also home to Jones County Junior College.

Jones County is in the zone of Jones College.

== Notable people ==
- Lance Bass, pop singer and member of 'N Sync, raised in Ellisville.
- Harry Craft, MLB player and manager, first manager of the Houston Colt .45s and minor league manager of Mickey Mantle
- Les DeVall, former head coach for McNeese State Cowboys football team
- Redd Foxx, actor, comedian. Raised by his grandmother during formative years.
- John Hartfield, a black man from Ellisville who was lynched and dismembered for having a white girlfriend
- Henry McCall, former Negro league first baseman
- Chris McDaniel, State Senator, attorney and host of the nationally syndicated The Right Side Radio Show
- Buddy Myer, two-time All-Star second baseman for the MLB Washington Senators in the 1930s, batting and stolen base titles
- Arnett Nelson, jazz musician
- Scottie Phillips, former National Football League running back
- Jeremiah Price, professional football player in the National Arena League
- Donnie Scoggin, member of the Mississippi House of Representatives
- Bobby Shows, former member of the Mississippi House of Representatives
- Jason Simpson, head coach of the UT Martin Skyhawks football team
- L. C. Ulmer, delta blues musician

== See also ==
- List of cities in Mississippi
- Free State of Jones
