= Dominique Curry =

American football player (born 1987)

No. 15
- Position: Wide receiver

Personal information
- Born: August 16, 1987 (age 39); Philadelphia, Pennsylvania, U.S.
- Listed height: 6 ft 3 in (1.91 m)
- Listed weight: 223 lb (101 kg)

Career information
- High school: Philadelphia (PA) Washington
- College: California (PA)
- NFL draft: 2010: undrafted

Career history
- St. Louis Rams (2010−2011); Detroit Lions (2012)*, (2013)*; Carolina Panthers (2013)*; San Jose SaberCats (2014); Philadelphia Soul (2015)*
- * Offseason or practice squad member only

Awards and highlights
- 3× All-Pennsylvania State Athletic Conference-East (2006–2008)

Career NFL statistics
- Total tackles: 12
- Fumble recoveries: 1
- Stats at Pro Football Reference

Career AFL statistics
- Receptions: 50
- Receiving yards: 588
- Receiving touchdowns: 25
- Total tackles: 21
- Rushing touchdowns: 5
- Stats at ArenaFan.com

Dominique Curry (born August 16, 1988) is an American former professional football player who was a wide receiver in the National Football League (NFL). After playing college football for the California Vulcans, he was signed by the St. Louis Rams as an undrafted free agent in 2010.

== Early life ==
Curry was a three-sport star (basketball, football and track) at George Washington High School in Philadelphia.

== College career ==
Curry finished his collegiate career at the California University of Pennsylvania (now PennWest California) in 2009 after playing three seasons at Cheyney University. At Cheyney, he had 134 receptions for 2,002 yards and 14 touchdowns. He recorded 13 special teams tackles and blocked two kicks during his only season at California and recorded four catches for 100 yards and a touchdown as a senior.

He caught 134 balls for 2,202 yards and 14 touchdowns while at Cheyney and was a three-time All-Pennsylvania State Athletic Conference East selection and was named PSAC East Rookie of the Year in 2006 after catching 63 passes for 1,035 yards and seven touchdowns. He also played basketball for four years at Cheyney, where he scored 1,079 career points and grabbed 606 career rebounds.

== Professional career ==
=== Pre-draft ===
Curry was part of a group of 10 standout football players from college programs around Western Pennsylvania who participated in a Pro Day at Adamson Stadium on March 30, 2010. Curry and the nine others were tested in a variety of NFL Combine-style drills, such as the 3-cone drill, vertical jump and 40-yard dash. Curry measured 6'2", 225 pounds and his 40-time was 4.61.

=== St. Louis Rams ===
Curry signed with the St. Louis Rams as an undrafted rookie free agent on May 3, 2010, after attending the team's rookie minicamp on a tryout basis. He made the Rams 53-man opening day roster and played in two games in 2010. In Week 3 of the 2010 NFL Season vs. the Washington Redskins, Curry blocked Redskins' punter Graham Gano's punt before suffering a season ending ACL injury. Curry was active for all 16 games during the 2011 NFL season, but did not catch a pass.

=== Detroit Lions ===
Curry was signed by the Detroit Lions on July 23, 2012.

Curry signed a futures contract with the Detroit Lions on January 1, 2013. He was released on June 17, 2013.

=== San Jose SaberCats ===
Curry was assigned to the Arena Football League's San Jose SaberCats on December 20, 2013.

=== Philadelphia Soul ===
On December 29, 2014, Curry was traded to the Philadelphia Soul for claim order positioning.
