= Hall Davis =

American football player (born 1987)

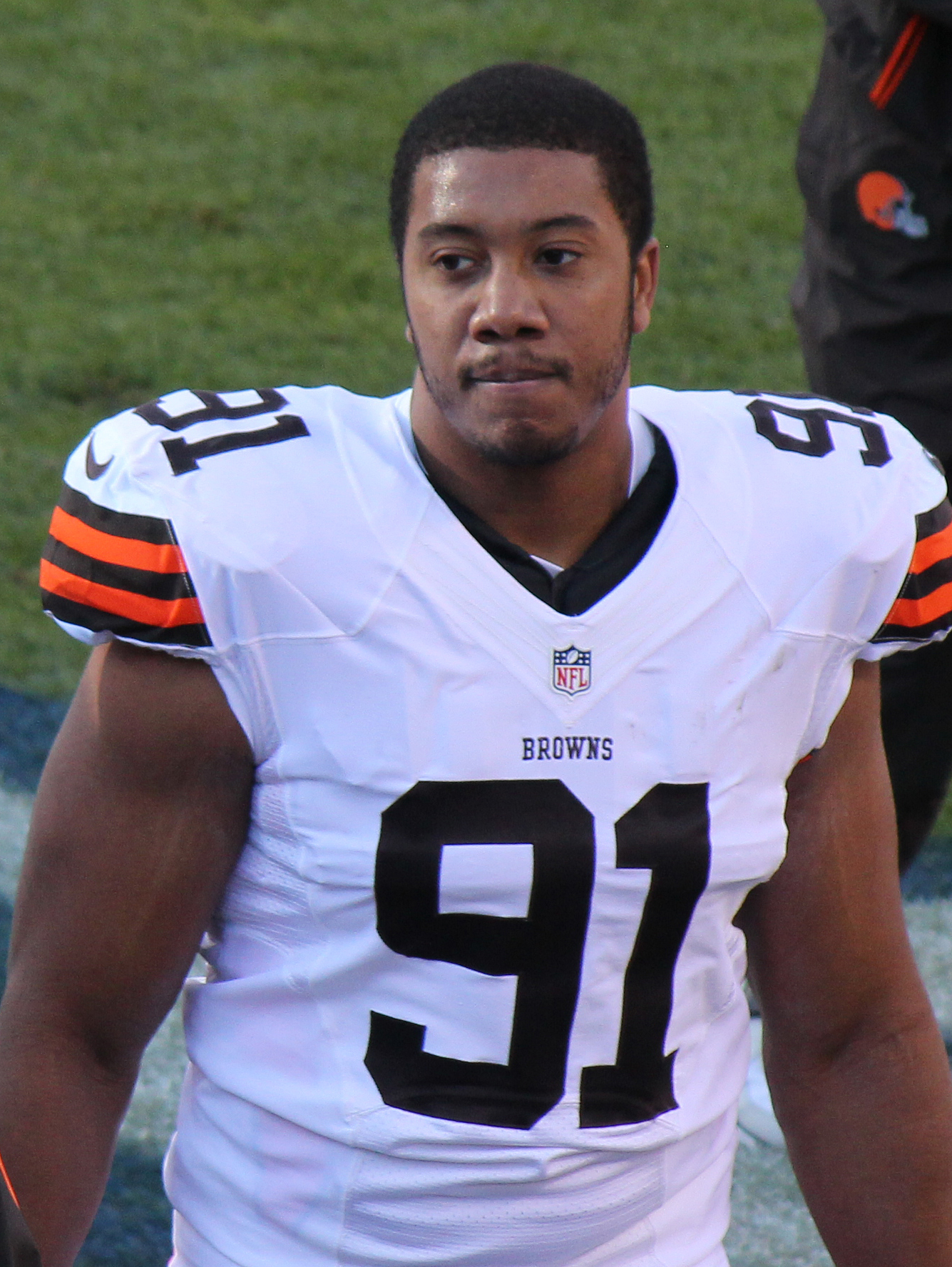
- Davis with the Cleveland Browns in 2012

No. 72, 91
- Position: Defensive end

Personal information
- Born: March 2, 1987 (age 39); Baton Rouge, Louisiana, U.S.
- Listed height: 6 ft 6 in (1.98 m)
- Listed weight: 262 lb (119 kg)

Career information
- High school: University (Baton Rouge)
- College: Louisiana-Lafayette
- NFL draft: 2010: 5th round, 149th overall pick

Career history
- St. Louis Rams (2010)*; Washington Redskins (2010)*; Tennessee Titans (2010); Oakland Raiders (2012)*; Cleveland Browns (2012); Dallas Cowboys (2013)*; Pittsburgh Steelers (2013)*; Denver Broncos (2013)*
- * Offseason or practice squad member only
- Stats at Pro Football Reference

Hall Lucien Davis (born March 2, 1987) is an American former professional football player who was a defensive end in the National Football League (NFL). He was selected by the St. Louis Rams in the fifth round of the 2010 NFL draft.

He was also a member of the Washington Redskins, Tennessee Titans, Oakland Raiders, Cleveland Browns, Dallas Cowboys, Pittsburgh Steelers, and Denver Broncos.

== Early life ==
Davis, a versatile player at University High School, earned All-District 8-2A honors with 20 receptions as a wide receiver. He also played defensive end and safety. During his senior season, he recorded 10 quarterback sacks and over 100 tackles

== College career ==
Davis started for two years and played across five seasons after receiving a medical redshirt due to a freshman-year injury. As a senior, he garnered honorable mention All-Sun Belt honors. In his final two seasons with the Cajuns, he recorded 6.5 sacks and 11 tackles for loss.

In his senior year (2009), Davis started all 12 games at defensive end, tying for the team lead in sacks and ranking 16th in the Sun Belt Conference in that category. He finished with 22 tackles (4.5 for loss) and three sacks. As a junior, he started all 12 games at defensive end, finishing second among defensive linemen in tackles and tackles-for-loss. He led the defensive line with 3.5 sacks and totaled 24 tackles (five for loss).

As a sophomore in 2007, Davis played in all 12 games at defensive end, recording 11 tackles (1.5 for loss). As a freshman, he played in all 12 games on the defensive line, starting the first two and recording two tackles. He was a redshirt freshman in 2005 due to an ankle injury.

== Professional career ==
Pre-draft measurables
Height	Weight	40-yard dash	20-yard shuttle	Three-cone drill	Vertical jump	Broad jump	Bench press
6 ft 3 3/4 in (1.92 m)	271 lb (123 kg)	4.87 s	4.63 s	7.63 s	34 1/2 in (0.88 m)	9 ft 6 in (2.90 m)	27 reps
All values from LA-Lafayette Pro Day

=== St. Louis Rams ===
Davis was selected in the fifth round of the 2010 NFL draft by the St. Louis Rams with the 149th overall pick. On June 28, 2010, Davis signed a four-year, $1.979 million contract with the Rams. The deal included a $188,881 signing bonus. In the three preseason games Davis played for the Rams in 2010, he had two tackles and two sacks. The two sacks tied for the team lead with Ram veteran defensive tackle Fred Robbins.

=== Washington Redskins ===
Davis was traded to the Washington Redskins on August 30, 2010, for an undisclosed conditional draft pick. The following day, August 31, 2010, he was released by the Redskins.

=== Tennessee Titans ===
On September 5, 2010, Davis was signed to the Tennessee Titans' practice squad. He was promoted to the active roster on December 17, 2010 and played in one game for the Titans that year. He was released on September 2, 2011.

=== Oakland Raiders ===
On January 6, 2012, he signed a future/reserve contract with the Oakland Raiders. He was waived on August 31, 2012.

=== Cleveland Browns ===
Davis was signed to the practice squad of the Cleveland Browns on October 31, 2012. He was moved to the active roster on December 18, 2012 and played in two games for the Browns that season. He was waived on August 31, 2013.

=== Dallas Cowboys ===
Davis was signed to the practice squad of the Dallas Cowboys on November 6, 2013. He was released on November 18, 2013.

=== Pittsburgh Steelers ===
Davis was signed to the practice squad of the Pittsburgh Steelers on December 11, 2013.

=== Denver Broncos ===
Davis was signed to the practice squad of the Denver Broncos on January 7, 2014, during the postseason. He re-signed with the team on February 4, 2014, and was waived on August 5, 2014.
