= Putnam City =

Putnam City may refer to:

- Bethany, Oklahoma, a town located within the Putnam City School District
- Putnam City School District, a school district located in Northwest Oklahoma City
  - Putnam City High School, a high school located within the Putnam City School district
  - Putnam City North High School, a high school located within the Putnam City School district
  - Putnam City West High School, a high school located within the Putnam City School district
- Warr Acres, Oklahoma, a town located within the Putnam City School district

== See also ==
- Oklahoma City
- Northwest Oklahoma City
