= Bill Amis =

American basketball player

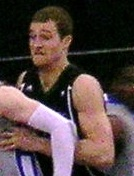
- Amis in March 2011 with Hawaii

No. 4 – Crelan Okapi Aalstar
- Position: Power forward
- League: Belgian League

Personal information
- Born: October 25, 1987 (age 39) Oklahoma City, Oklahoma
- Listed height: 6 ft 9 in (2.06 m)
- Listed weight: 231 lb (105 kg)

Career information
- High school: Putnam City (Warr Acres, Oklahoma)
- College: Pratt CC (2006–2007); Hawaii (2007–2011)
- NBA draft: 2011: undrafted
- Playing career: 2011–2019

Career history
- 2011–2012: Tartu
- 2013–2014: Keravnos
- 2014–2016: Steaua București
- 2016–2019: Okapi Aalstar

Career highlights
- BLB All-Defensive Team (2018); All-WAC (2011)

Wilburn Davis "Bill" Amis IV (pronounced A-miss) (born October 25, 1987) is a former American professional basketball player who last played for Crelan Okapi Aalstar of the Euromillions Basketball League in Belgium.

== Early life and college career ==
Amis was born in Oklahoma City and graduated from Putnam City High School in 2006. He enrolled at Pratt Community College in Kansas and transferred to the University of Hawaiʻi at Mānoa after one year.

College recruiting
Name	Hometown	School	Height	Weight	Commit date
Bill Amis; C	Oklahoma City, Oklahoma	Pratt CC	6 ft 9 in (2.06 m)	220 lb (100 kg)	Aug 13, 2007
Bill Amis; C	Recruit ratings: Rivals:				
Overall recruit ranking: Scout: JC Rivals: JC
Note: In many cases, Scout, Rivals, 247Sports, On3, and ESPN may conflict in their listings of height and weight.; In these cases, the average was taken. ESPN grades are on a 100-point scale.; Sources: "2007 Hawaii Basketball Commitment List". Rivals.; "2007 Hawaii College Basketball Team Recruiting Prospects". Scout.; "Hawaii Warriors 2007 Player Commits". ESPN.; "Scout.com Team Recruiting Rankings". Scout.; "2007 Team Ranking". Rivals.

Amis played in the forward position with the Hawaii Rainbow Warriors. In his senior season, Amis was team co-captain with Hiram Thompson and was a second-team All-Western Athletic Conference selection. He averaged 15.2 points and 7.8 rebounds. After graduating from Hawaii, Amis tried out with his hometown NBA team Oklahoma City Thunder.

== Professional career ==
For the 2011–12 season he signed with Tartu Ülikool Korvpallimeeskond of Estonia.

In July 2013, Amis signed with Eisbären Bremerhaven of Germany. However, he did not passed the tryout period so he was released before the season began. He then moved to Cyprus and signed with Keravnos.

In July 2014, he signed with Steaua București of Romania.

In June 2016, Amis signed with Crelan Okapi Aalstar of the Euromillions Basketball League in Belgium.
