= Putnam City West High School =

Location
- 8500 N. W. 23rd Oklahoma City, Oklahoma; United States; 35.4928°N 97.6604°W

Information
- Type: Public
- Established: 1968
- Locale: Suburban
- School district: Putnam City Schools
- NCES School ID: 402529001343
- Principal: Edward Smith
- Teaching staff: 122.84 (on an FTE basis)
- Grades: 9–12
- Enrollment: 1,935 (2023-2024)
- Student to teacher ratio: 15.75
- Colors: Columbia blue and gold
- Athletics conference: OSSAA 6A-II
- Mascot: Patriots
- Nickname: PC West, West, PCW
- Rivals: Putnam City High School, Putnam City North High School
- Yearbook: Patriot Profile
- Website: pcwest.putnamcityschools.org/o/pcw

Putnam City West High School is a public 9–12 grade school in Oklahoma City, Oklahoma. It is part of the Putnam City Schools district. The school serves portions of suburban Oklahoma City as well as portions of Bethany and Warr Acres, and Woodlawn Park.

The school's sports teams are known as the Patriots and they are notable for having been state champions in football in 1981 and runners up in 1976 and 1977. The football program also compiled a 28 game losing streak that ended with a 30-21 win over Shawnee High School in 2010. In 2014, the school's basketball program was runner up for the Oklahoma 6A basketball title, losing to Tulsa Union High School in the final. In 2016, Putnam City West's boys' basketball team beat Norman North High School for the 6A state title. Most recently, the school's girls basketball program won the 6A state championship for the 2023-2024 season

== History ==
Putnam City West High School was opened in 1968 to relieve overcrowding at neighboring Putnam City High School during a period of suburbanization in western Oklahoma City.

During this period from the 1960s through the late 1980s the Putnam City Public Schools District experienced a great increase in student enrollment numbers from ongoing suburban development, fueled in part by white flight due to desegregation and busing court orders that affected Oklahoma City Public Schools. By the 1990s, the school and district as a whole had begun to experience white flight as well and began experiencing many of the same issues with poverty as inner city schools in the area.

== Notable alumni ==
- Scott Tinsley, former USC Trojans and NFL quarterback
- Rickey Brady, former Oklahoma Sooners and NFL tight end
- Stacey (Loach) Logan, Broadway actress
- Bryan White, country music artist
- Austin Winkler, lead singer, Hinder
- Tammy West, member of the Oklahoma House of Representatives
- Brian Tallet, former Major League Baseball player
- Jeff Salazar, former Major League Baseball player
- Danielle Gant, former WNBA player for the Chicago Sky
