= Deji Karim =

American football player (born 1986)

No. 35, 36, 39
- Position: Running back

Personal information
- Born: November 18, 1986 (age 39); Oklahoma City, Oklahoma, U.S.
- Listed height: 5 ft 11 in (1.80 m)
- Listed weight: 200 lb (91 kg)

Career information
- High school: Putnam City North (Oklahoma City)
- College: Southern Illinois
- NFL draft: 2010: 6th round, 180th overall pick

Career history
- Jacksonville Jaguars (2010−2011); Indianapolis Colts (2012); Houston Texans (2013); Indianapolis Colts (2014)*
- * Offseason or practice squad member only

Career NFL statistics
- Rushing attempts: 110
- Rushing yards: 341
- Receptions: 18
- Receiving yards: 129
- Return yards: 2,332
- Total touchdowns: 1
- Stats at Pro Football Reference

Abdul-Gafar Olatokumbo Ayodeji Lamar "Deji" Karim (/ˈdeɪʒi kəˈriːm/ DAY-zhee kə-REEM; born November 18, 1986) is an American former professional football player who was a running back in the National Football League (NFL). He was selected by the Jacksonville Jaguars in the 2010 NFL draft. He played college football for the Northeastern Oklahoma A&M Golden Norsemen and Southern Illinois Salukis.

== Early life ==
Karim attended Putnam City North High School in Oklahoma City where he was teammates with Arizona Cardinals quarterback Sam Bradford. He earned all state honors his senior year after he rushed for more than 2,000 yards and scored 28 TDs as a senior. He was not offered a scholarship although he did have interest from schools such as Colorado State, Kansas State, SMU, and Oklahoma State.

== College career ==
Karim played two seasons (2005, 2006) at Northeastern Oklahoma A&M College. In those two seasons he rushed for 1,972 yards on 328 carries with 25 touchdowns. He also had 25 receptions for 315 yards and a receiving touchdown.

Karim then transferred to Southern Illinois University. He led the Salukis in 2007 with eight rushing touchdowns, but missed the 2008 season with a knee injury. The 2009 season brought him national recognition as he led the Football Championship Subdivision with 1,694 rushing yards and guided Southern Illinois to the No. 1 national ranking for three weeks, its second-straight Missouri Valley Football Conference Championship and the Elite Eight of the FCS Playoffs. Karim broke the SIU single-season record for all-purpose yards (2,339) and averaged 30.9 yards on 14 kickoff returns with one touchdown. He was named a first-team All-American by four different services and was the MVFC Offensive Player of the Year. Karim finished third in the voting for the 2009 Walter Payton Award (awarded annually to the most outstanding offensive player in the Division I Football Championship Subdivision).

He finished his career at Southern Illinois with 2,080 rushing yards, 26 rushing touchdowns, 10 career 100-yard rushing games and averaged 6.58 yards per carry. Karim only fumbled once in 351 career touches.

== Professional career ==
Pre-draft measurables
Height	Weight	40-yard dash	10-yard split	20-yard split	20-yard shuttle	Three-cone drill	Vertical jump	Broad jump	Bench press
5 ft 8 5/8 in (1.74 m)	209 lb (95 kg)	4.40 s	1.45 s	2.45 s	4.33 s	6.95 s	43 in (1.09 m)	10 ft 3 in (3.12 m)	19 reps
All values from SIU Pro Day (March 18, 2010)

=== Jacksonville Jaguars ===
Karim was selected by the Jacksonville Jaguars with the 180th overall pick in the sixth round of the 2010 NFL draft. In July 2010, Karim signed a four-year, $1.9 million contract with the Jaguars. During the 2010 season, Karim was used primarily as a returner and was the Jaguars' third running back on the depth chart. Karim had 50 kick returns and averaged 25 yards per return. On limited carries he produced 160 yards during his rookie season.

On April 27, 2012, Karim was released by the Jaguars.

=== Indianapolis Colts ===
On April 30, 2012, Karim was claimed off waivers by the Indianapolis Colts. On December 30, Karim returned a kick off 101 yards for a touchdown against the Houston Texans.

=== Houston Texans ===
On May 15, 2013, Karim signed with the Houston Texans. On September 1, Karim was cut from the final roster of the Texans. On October 28, Karim re-signed with Texans once again due to an injuries to Arian Foster and Ben Tate.

=== Indianapolis Colts (second stint) ===
On August 17, 2014, Karim agreed to terms with the Indianapolis Colts. He was placed on injured reserve on August 26 with an undisclosed injury. On September 2, Karim was released by the Colts with an injury settlement.

== Professional statistics ==
Year	Carries	Yards	Rushing Touchdowns	Yards Per Carry	Receptions	Yards	Receiving Touchdowns	Return yards	Return Touchdowns	Fumbles
2010	35	160	0	4.6	3	10	0	1,248	0	4
2011	63	125	0	2.1	14	120	0	652	0	1
2012	0	0	0	0	0	0	0	328	1	0
2013	12	51	0	4.3	1	-1	0	104	0	0
Career	110	341	0	3.1	18	129	0	2,332	1	5
