= Woodlawn Park, Oklahoma =

- Town
- Location in Oklahoma County and the state of Oklahoma.
- Coordinates: 35°30′35″N 97°38′59″W
- Country: United States
- State: Oklahoma
- County: Oklahoma

Area
  - Total: 0.12 sq mi (0.32 km^{2})
  - Land: 0.12 sq mi (0.32 km^{2})
  - Water: 0 sq mi (0.00 km^{2})
- Elevation: 1,289 ft (393 m)

Population (2020)
  - Total: 160
  - Density: 1,292.6/sq mi (499.06/km^{2})
- Time zone: UTC-6 (Central (CST))
  - Summer (DST): UTC-5 (CDT)
- FIPS code: 40-82000
- GNIS feature ID: 2413505

Woodlawn Park is a town in Oklahoma County, Oklahoma, United States, and a part of the Oklahoma City Metropolitan Area. As of the 2020 census, Woodlawn Park had a population of 160.

== History ==
An incorporated town in Oklahoma County, Woodlawn Park is one of several urban islands surrounded by other towns of the Oklahoma City metropolitan area. Woodlawn Park lies within the city of Bethany, which is itself surrounded by Oklahoma City. Originally the area was the farm of Frank Levi Braniger, who acquired land in Council Grove Township with, or soon after, the Land Run of 1889. In 1923 one of Braniger's sons subdivided a heavily wooded part of the property into residential lots. This became Woodlawn Park, a rectangle of .128 square miles (approximately eighty-one acres), measuring one-half mile east–west and one-quarter mile north–south. It is bounded by Council Road on the west, Glade Avenue on the east, NW 36th Street on the south, and NW 39th Street on the north. Within the boundaries, between NW 37th and NW 38th streets lies a long park, the center of the town. A few homes were constructed in the late 1920s, but most of the development occurred in the late 1940s and through the 1950s.

Incorporation was accomplished in July 1952 as Bethany began to envelop the neighborhood. The 1960 census recorded 129 inhabitants. Woodlawn Park's large lots were gradually sold, and housing construction continued into the 1990s. After peaking at 220 residents in 1970, the community's population declined to 161 in 2000. The town supports no commercial development. A board of trustees is elected, but city services are provided by Bethany and Oklahoma County. Most residents are employed in management and the professions, and all work in the surrounding metropolitan area. http://digital.library.okstate.edu/encyclopedia/entries/W/WO012.html

== Geography ==
According to the United States Census Bureau, the town has a total area of 0.1 square miles (0.26 km^{2}), all land. Woodlawn Park is a doubly enclaved municipality, being wholely surrounded by Bethany, which itself is wholely within Oklahoma City.

== Demographics ==
Historical population
Census	Pop.	Note	%±
1960	129		—
1970	220		70.5%
1980	167		−24.1%
1990	170		1.8%
2000	161		−5.3%
2010	153		−5.0%
2020	160		4.6%
U.S. Decennial Census

=== 2020 census ===
As of the 2020 census, Woodlawn Park had a population of 160. The median age was 57.0 years. 18.1% of residents were under the age of 18 and 32.5% of residents were 65 years of age or older. For every 100 females there were 100.0 males, and for every 100 females age 18 and over there were 101.5 males age 18 and over.

100.0% of residents lived in urban areas, while 0.0% lived in rural areas.

There were 75 households in Woodlawn Park, of which 29.3% had children under the age of 18 living in them. Of all households, 57.3% were married-couple households, 14.7% were households with a male householder and no spouse or partner present, and 20.0% were households with a female householder and no spouse or partner present. About 20.0% of all households were made up of individuals and 13.3% had someone living alone who was 65 years of age or older.

There were 76 housing units, of which 1.3% were vacant. The homeowner vacancy rate was 1.7% and the rental vacancy rate was 0.0%.

Racial composition as of the 2020 census
Race	Number	Percent
White	131	81.9%
Black or African American	2	1.2%
American Indian and Alaska Native	0	0.0%
Asian	1	0.6%
Native Hawaiian and Other Pacific Islander	0	0.0%
Some other race	8	5.0%
Two or more races	18	11.2%
Hispanic or Latino (of any race)	7	4.4%

=== 2000 census ===
As of the census of 2000, there were 161 people, 75 households, and 48 families residing in the town. The population density was 1,256.4 inhabitants per square mile (485.1/km^{2}). There were 77 housing units at an average density of 600.9 per square mile (232.0/km^{2}). The racial makeup of the town was 93.79% White, 1.24% Native American, 0.62% Asian, and 4.35% from two or more races.

There were 75 households, out of which 20.0% had children under the age of 18 living with them, 61.3% were married couples living together, 1.3% had a female householder with no husband present, and 36.0% were non-families. 34.7% of all households were made up of individuals, and 20.0% had someone living alone who was 65 years of age or older. The average household size was 2.15 and the average family size was 2.75.

In the town, the population was spread out, with 18.0% under the age of 18, 3.7% from 18 to 24, 13.0% from 25 to 44, 39.1% from 45 to 64, and 26.1% who were 65 years of age or older. The median age was 51 years. For every 100 females, there were 109.1 males. For every 100 females age 18 and over, there were 88.6 males.

The median income for a household in the town was $46,806, and the median income for a family was $58,750. Males had a median income of $46,250 versus $33,333 for females. The per capita income for the town was $43,376. About 6.0% of families and 5.6% of the population were below the poverty line, including none of those under the age of 18 and 8.3% of those 65 or over.

== Education ==
It is in the Putnam City Public Schools school district.

Zoned schools are: Overholser Elementary School, Western Oaks Middle School, and Putnam City West High School.
