= Mary Millben =

American singer

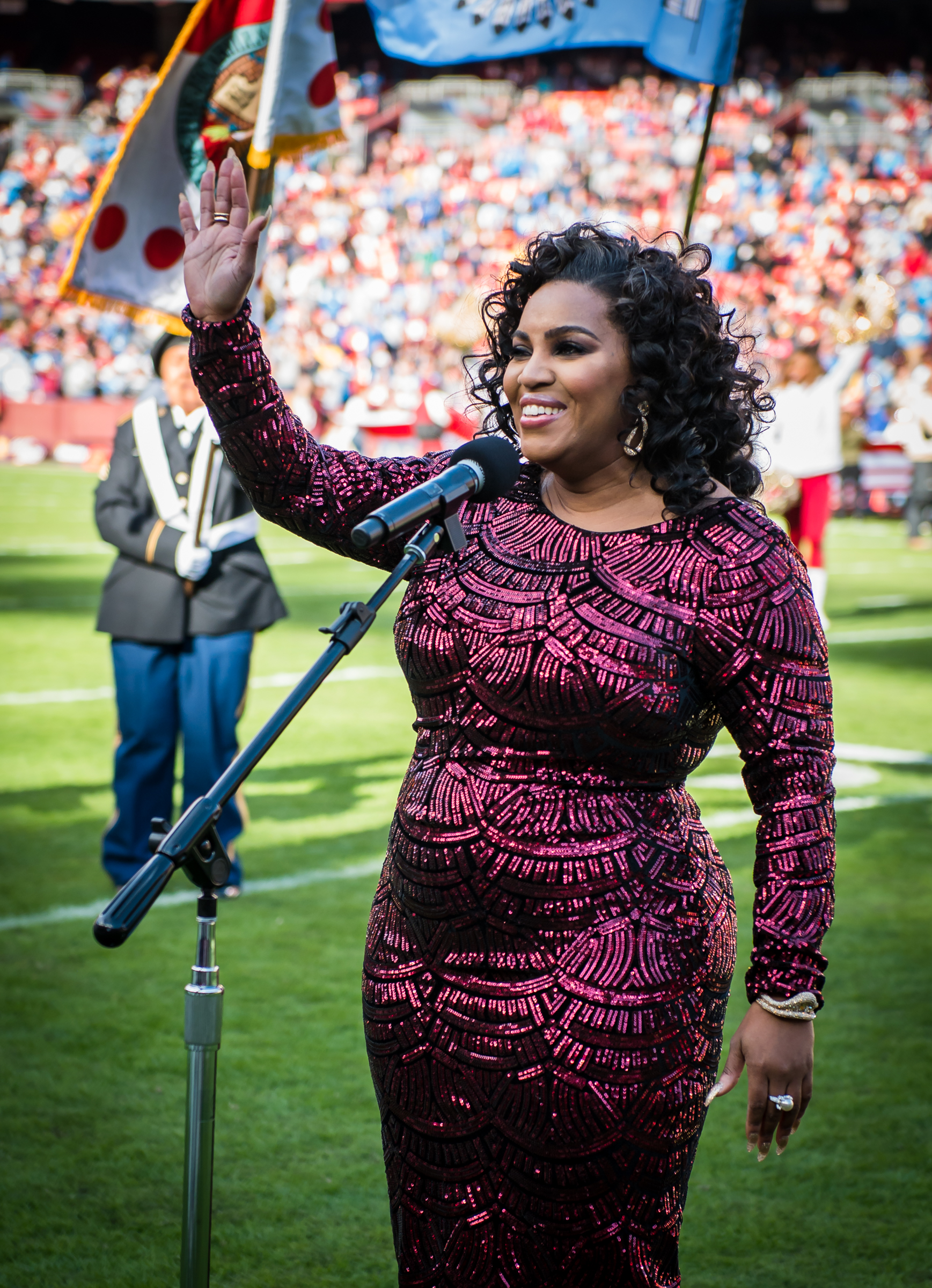
- Millben in 2019
- Born: March 4, 1982 (age 44); Oklahoma City, OK
- Education: Putnam City High School; The University of Oklahoma
- Occupations: Actress; Singer; Entrepreneur
- Musical career
- Genres: World Music
- Instruments: Vocals, violin
- Years active: 2008 – present
- Website: www.marymillben.com

Mary Jorie Millben is an American singer, actress, and media personality. Millben has performed for five consecutive U.S. Presidents: George W. Bush, Barack Obama, Donald Trump, Joe Biden, and Donald Trump. Millben is the founder and CEO of JMDE Enterprises, Incorporated. Millben is a 2010 Helen Hayes Award Nominee.

== Early life and education ==
Millben was born and grew up in Oklahoma City, Oklahoma. She is the daughter of Rev. Michael Millben. Her mother, Althea Millben is a classically trained soprano and a retired Pentecostal music pastor. Millben started singing at the age of five in the children's choir at Wildewood Christian Church in Oklahoma City. Her parents divorced in 1987 and Millben was raised by her mother. Millben attended Putnam City High School and is an Oklahoma Girls State/Girls Nation alum. Millben studied opera at the University of Oklahoma under tenor Don Bernardini. Millben was elected the second University of Oklahoma African-American female Student Body President in 2004 and the first University of Oklahoma African-American female vice-president in 2003.

== Career ==
In 2005, Millben worked as a summer White House intern for President George W. Bush and as a White House presidential appointee for President Bush from September 2006 to January 2009. Millben was invited by former First Lady Laura Bush as a guest soloist for the 2008 White House Holiday Season, birthing her professional career.

In 2013, Millben headlined a solo concert for Europe's celebration of Black History Month in Zagreb, Croatia. Upon invitation from Cui Tiankai, the Chinese Ambassador to the United States, Millben performed The Star-Spangled Banner and the March of the Volunteers for the 40th Anniversary of U.S.–China Student Exchanges at the Embassy of China in Washington, D.C., on November 21, 2019.

February 2020, Notefornote Entertainment released Millben's debut single “Grace Will Lead Me Home”

In June 2023, Millben performed the National Anthem of India at the Ronald Reagan Building during the US visit of Prime Minister Narendra Modi hosted by President Joe Biden. After the 2023 Manipur violence, Millben tweeted in support of Prime Minister Modi and criticized the Indian opposition for speaking out against Modi. Milliben echoed support for Citizen Amendment Bill passed by Indian parliament and called it a true democratic move.

Millben performed the US national anthem for the 45th Anniversary of the Establishment of Diplomatic Relations Between China and the United States and the 2024 Chinese New Year January 17, 2024 hosted by His Excellency Xie Feng, Chinese Ambassador to the United States at the Chinese Embassy in Washington, D.C.

On July 18, 2024, Millben performed the US national anthem on the last day of the 2024 Republican National Convention just prior to President Donald J. Trump accepting the nomination as the 47th President of the United States.

On August 31st, 2024, Millben released her new single “On To Victory”

On January 20th, 2025, Millben performed for the 60th Presidential Inauguration Official Liberty Ball hosted by the 47th President of the United States Donald J. Trump and First Lady Melania Trump
