= Ed Roberts (poet) =

American poet

Ed Roberts (born June 27, 1958, in Oklahoma City, Oklahoma) is an American poet, writer and publisher currently based in Yukon, Oklahoma.

== Early life ==
Ed Roberts was born June 27, 1958, in Oklahoma City, Oklahoma. He graduated Putnam City High School in 1976. After a life-threatening illness in the year 2000 Roberts began to publicly share his poetry.

== Poetry ==
=== Style and influences ===
His poems are mainly written in free verse. without regular meter, rhyme, and alliteration. According to Roberts these characteristics of poetry "would not translate the same in other languages." Roberts had a poem translated into Cherokee for inclusion in the anthology Amaravati Poetic Prism 2019. Roberts writing is influenced by his Oklahoma and Cherokee heritage.

=== Publications and honors ===
Roberts has given readings and speeches about poetry in schools, universities and at poetry festivals. In 2005 Roberts represented the United States with nine other writers at the Odyssey International Festival in Amman, Jordan. He serves as the parliamentarian for the Poetry Society of Oklahoma. Roberts is the author of ten poetry collections. Roberts’ poems have also been published by The Poetic Voices Magazine and The Poetry Sharings Journal.

== Bibliography ==
=== Poetry for life series ===
- Poetry For Life The Poetry For Life Project, 2006. ISBN 978-1-4243-2597-9
- Save Our Selves
- A Walk Through Time

=== Poetry collections ===
- A Poet's Last Stand. A Collection of Poems & Song Lyrics. Virtualbookworm.com Publishing, 2002 ISBN 1-58939-257-4 / Createspace, 2014. ISBN 978-1499349979
- Whispers, Tears, Prayers and Hope. Poetry & Song Lyrics. VonChasePublishing Company, 2008. ISBN 978-0-9766787-7-9 / Createspace, 2016. ISBN 978-1533628947
- Everything Must Have a Beginning, a Middle, and an End Createspace, 2014. ISBN 978-1499541830
- When Words Escape You, You Can Use Mine Createspace, 2014. ISBN 978-1499563368
- I'm Still Standing Createspace, 2014. ISBN 978-1499372564
- Sometimes We Wait Createspace, 2016. ISBN 978-1540615282
- From the Pill to the Bottle to You Createspace, 2016. ISBN 978-1536949810
- The Traveler Createspace, 2016. ISBN 978-1535105149
- Words for the Heart from over 40 years of Marriage Createspace, 2017. ISBN 978-1979742337

=== Anthologies ===
- Iyengar-Paddy, Padmaja, ed. Amaravati Poetic Prism 2017 Cultural Centre of Vijayawada & Amaravati (CCVA), Vijayawada, 2017. ISBN 978-9386653277
- Iyengar-Paddy, Padmaja, ed. Amaravati Poetic Prism 2018 Cultural Centre of Vijayawada & Amaravati (CCVA), Vijayawada, 2018. ISBN 978-9388125338
- Iyengar-Paddy, Padmaja, ed. Amaravati Poetic Prism 2019 Cultural Centre of Vijayawada & Amaravati (CCVA), Vijayawada, 2020. ISBN 978-9353917920
- Dravis, Betty and Von, Chase, eds. Dream Reachers II VonChasePublishing, 2011. ISBN 978-0982346471
