= Unbeatable Harold =

- Promotional film poster
- Directed by: Ari Palitz
- Written by: Gordon Michaels; Randy Noojin
- Produced by: Gordon Michaels
- Starring: Gordon Michaels; Nicole DeHuff; Dylan McDermott; Henry Winkler; Gladys Knight; Phyllis Diller; Charles Durning
- Cinematography: Robert Hayes
- Edited by: Jason Schmid
- Music by: Michael A. Reagan
- Release dates: March 2006 (HBO Festival); June 12, 2009 (United States)
- Running time: 82 minutes
- Countries: US; UK
- Language: English

Unbeatable Harold is a 2006 romantic comedy feature film directed by Ari Palitz and starring Gordon Michaels, Nicole DeHuff, Henry Winkler, Gladys Knight, Charles Durning, Taryn Manning, Phyllis Diller, Lourdes Benedicto and Dylan McDermott. It is based on a play by Randy Noojin.

An earlier version of the film was originally shown at film festivals in 2006: at the ISIS theater in Aspen in March 2006, at the HBO Comedy Festival and at the Waterfront Film Festival in Saugatuck, Michigan. In 2008, new scenes were filmed and added, and the film was completely re-edited. A new score composed by Mike Reagan was also added. It was released theatrically in June 2009 in North America. It was released on DVD on February 23, 2010.

This film marks Nicole DeHuff's final film appearance, before she died in 2005 from pneumonia. Her husband, Ari Palitz, directed the film.
