= Nicole DeHuff =

American actress (1975–2005)

- Born: Nicole Renee DeHuff; January 6, 1975; Antlers, Oklahoma, U.S.
- Died: February 16, 2005 (aged 30); Los Angeles, California, U.S.
- Education: Carnegie Mellon University
- Occupation: Actress
- Years active: 2000–2005
- Spouse: Ari Palitz (m. 2000)

Nicole Renee DeHuff (January 6, 1975 – February 16, 2005) was an American actress best known for her role in the comedy movie Meet the Parents (2000). She died of pneumonia in 2005.

== Early life ==
DeHuff was born in Antlers, Oklahoma, and raised in Broken Bow, Oklahoma, and Oklahoma City. DeHuff graduated from Putnam City High School in 1993. She began her acting career by earning a bachelor's degree in drama from Carnegie Mellon University in 1998. DeHuff also married executive producer and director Ari Palitz, whom she met at Carnegie Mellon.

== Career ==
DeHuff landed her first big role in the hit movie comedy Meet the Parents, in which she played the character of Teri Polo's sister, Deborah Byrnes. After Meet the Parents, DeHuff had a regular role in the 2002 television series The Court and appeared in CSI: Crime Scene Investigation, CSI: Miami, Without a Trace, Dragnet, The Practice, and Monk.

== Death ==
In the days preceding her death, DeHuff checked into two hospitals for respiratory problems, and was misdiagnosed both times as having bronchitis. She was sent home and directed to take Tylenol, in addition to being prescribed an antibiotic, but her health worsened. On February 16, 2005, paramedics rushed to her home after she collapsed, gasping for breath. She subsequently lost consciousness en route to the hospital. By the time the doctor discovered her true illness, pneumonia, it was too late. Shortly upon arrival to the facility, she died at the age of 30.

Between 2004 and 2005, DeHuff worked on three feature films. One of these, Unbeatable Harold, her final film which was released posthumously, was directed by her husband.

== Filmography ==
Year	Title	Role	Notes
2000	Meet the Parents	Deborah "Debbie" Byrnes	
2000	Killing Cinderella		
2001	CSI: Crime Scene Investigation	Tina Kolas	Episode: "Alter Boys"
2001	The Practice	Michelle Farrell	Episode: "Dangerous Liaisons"
2002	The Court	Alexis Cameron	TV series
2003	Without A Trace	Cathy Dobson	Episode: "Underground Railroad"
2003	Dragnet	Claudia Hellman	Episode: "The Magic Bullet"
2004	Monk	Vicki Salinas	Episode: "Mr. Monk and the Paperboy"
2004	CSI: Miami	Carrie Delgado	2 episodes
2004	Suspect Zero	Katie Potter	
2005	See Arnold Run	Barbara	TV movie
2006	Unbeatable Harold	Wanda Livingston	Posthumous release (final film role)
