= Eldon Lyon Park =

Park in Bethany, Oklahoma

Coordinates: 35°30′36″N 97°38′32″W

- Interactive map of Eldon Lyon Park
- Type: Suburban park
- Location: Bethany, Oklahoma
- Operator: Bethany Parks and Rec
- Visitors: 5 million
- Open: All year, dawn to dusk daily.

Eldon Lyon Park is a 60-acre park owned and operated by the city of Bethany, Oklahoma. It contains multiple picnic tables, pavilions, and playgrounds, as well as a basketball court and 1 1/2 mile walking path.

During the 4th of July, the park is home of the Bethany Freedom Celebration. The Freedom Celebration includes rides, food, crafts booths, concerts, and fireworks.
