= Sam Bradford =

American football player (born 1987)

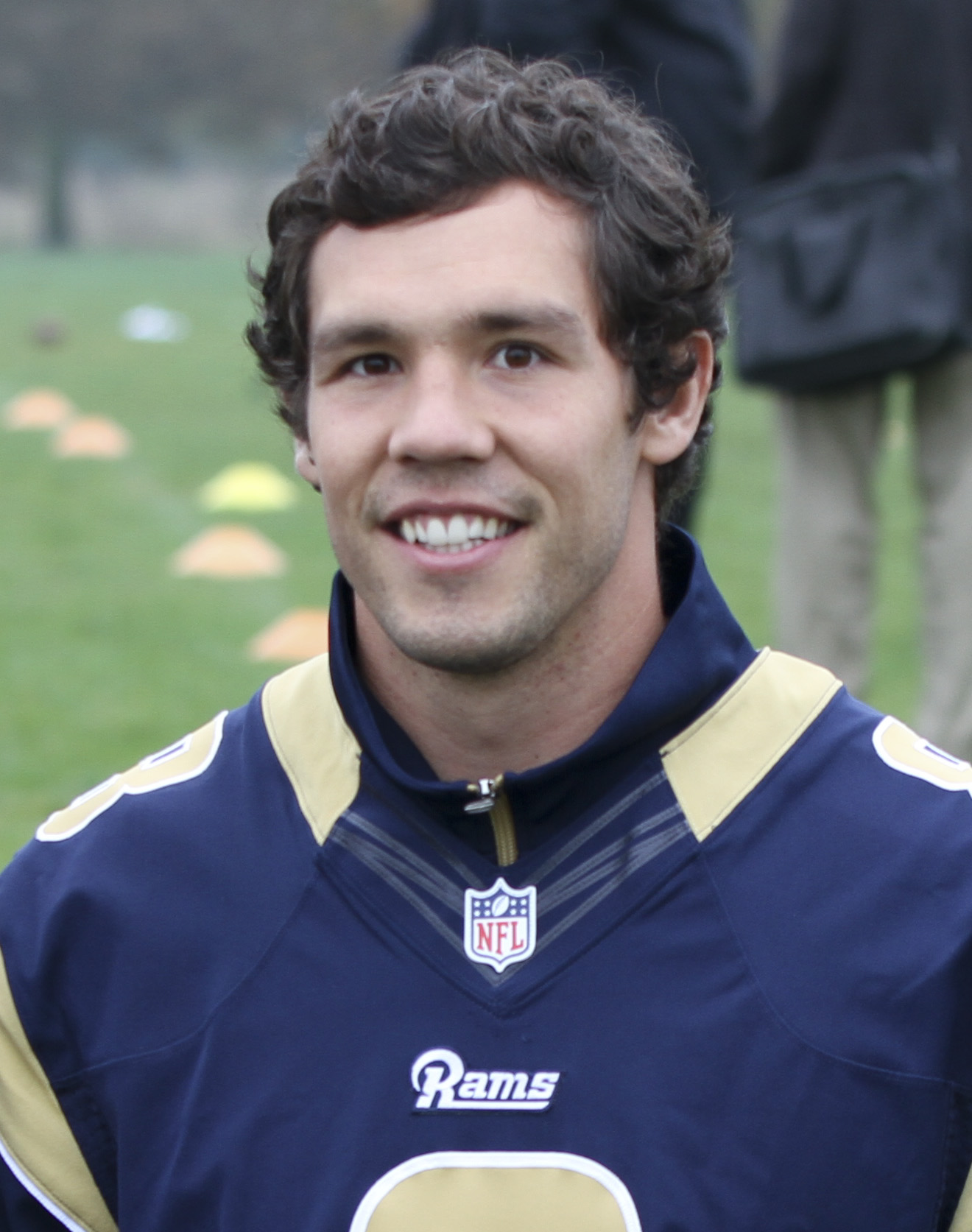
- Bradford with the St. Louis Rams in 2012

No. 8, 7, 9
- Position: Quarterback

Personal information
- Born: November 8, 1987 (age 39); Oklahoma City, Oklahoma, U.S.
- Listed height: 6 ft 4 in (1.93 m)
- Listed weight: 224 lb (102 kg)

Career information
- High school: Putnam City North (Oklahoma City)
- College: Oklahoma (2006–2009)
- NFL draft: 2010: 1st round, 1st overall pick

Career history
- St. Louis Rams (2010–2014); Philadelphia Eagles (2015); Minnesota Vikings (2016–2017); Arizona Cardinals (2018)

Awards and highlights
- NFL Offensive Rookie of the Year (2010); NFL completion percentage leader (2016); Heisman Trophy (2008)

Career NFL statistics
- Passing attempts: 2,967
- Passing completions: 1,855
- Completion percentage: 62.5%
- TD–INT: 103–61
- Passing yards: 19,449
- Passer rating: 84.5
- Stats at Pro Football Reference

Samuel Jacob Bradford (born November 8, 1987) is an American former professional football player who was a quarterback for nine seasons in the National Football League (NFL).

Bradford attended Putnam City North High School, where he starred in football, basketball and golf. As a senior quarterback in 2005, he threw for 2,029 yards and 17 touchdowns in 12 games. Bradford was not highly recruited coming out of high school, but he received a scholarship offer from the University of Oklahoma, which he accepted. After a redshirt season in 2006, Bradford threw for 3,121 yards and 36 touchdowns as a redshirt freshman with the Oklahoma Sooners. In 2008, Bradford became only the second sophomore to win the Heisman Trophy as he led the highest-scoring offense in NCAA history, passing for 4,720 yards with 50 touchdowns and just eight interceptions. He again led the nation in passing and also added five rushing touchdowns as the Sooners went 12–1 and advanced to the BCS national title game.

Bradford declared for the NFL draft following the 2009 season and was selected by the St. Louis Rams with the first overall selection in the 2010 NFL draft. That year, Bradford set the record for most completions by a rookie in NFL history, which helped earn him the NFL Offensive Rookie of the Year award. Prior to the start of the 2015 season, the Rams traded Bradford along with a 2015 fifth-round pick to the Philadelphia Eagles in exchange for quarterback Nick Foles, a 2015 fourth-round pick, and a 2016 second-round pick. Following his 2015 campaign with the Eagles, in which he set career-highs in passing yards (3,725), completion percentage (65%) and yards per attempt (7.0), the Minnesota Vikings acquired Bradford after their starting quarterback Teddy Bridgewater was lost to a season-ending knee injury before the start of the season. Bradford signed with the Arizona Cardinals in 2018 and started three games, but was replaced by rookie Josh Rosen and eventually released.

== Early life ==
Bradford was born to Kent and Martha Bradford in Oklahoma City, Oklahoma. He attended Putnam City North High School in Oklahoma City, where he starred in football, basketball, baseball, and golf for the Putnam City North Panthers. Bradford played as a pitcher in baseball, but gave up baseball after his freshman year. He earned All-City honors as a junior quarterback in football by The Oklahoman. Following his senior season in which he threw for 2,029 yards and 17 touchdowns in 12 games, Bradford was named to the Oklahoma Coaches Association All-State Team and was a Second-Team All-State pick by The Oklahoman.

Bradford was also a Division I-caliber basketball player. As a senior, he averaged 18.6 points and 10.5 rebounds per game and played on the same elite AAU team as fellow Oklahoma City native and NBA star Blake Griffin. In golf, Bradford defeated future PGA touring pros Kevin Tway and Robert Streb during his high school career. In addition to the aforementioned sports, Bradford also played ice hockey in his youth. In 1999, when Bradford was 12, his travel team, the Junior Blazers, won a regional championship, beating a team from Houston. He quit the sport that same year, and according to his former hockey coach Mike McEwen, who played on three Stanley Cup championship teams with the New York Islanders, Bradford had the talent to make it in the NHL. McEwen also said that Bradford was one of the best players he ever coached.

In the spring of 2005, by the end of Bradford's junior season, he garnered interest from several Division I football programs, including Stanford, Michigan, Texas Tech, and nearby Oklahoma. Following his senior season, Bradford was viewed as a two-to-three-star recruit (out of five) and was not that highly ranked among the high school class of 2006, with his highest ranking being No. 12 among only pro-style quarterbacks by recruiting source Rivals.com. Bradford was ranked behind Pat Devlin, "Juice" Williams, and Josh Freeman, and was overshadowed by five-star recruits such as Mitch Mustain, Matthew Stafford, and Tim Tebow.

College recruiting
Name	Hometown	School	Height	Weight	40^{‡}	Commit date
Sam Bradford; QB	Oklahoma City, Oklahoma	Putnam City North High School	6 ft 4 in (1.93 m)	200 lb (91 kg)	4.78	Dec 2, 2005
Sam Bradford; QB	Recruit ratings: Scout: Rivals: (79)					
Overall recruit ranking: Scout: 18 (QB) Rivals: 12 (QB), 1 (Oklahoma) ESPN: 16 (QB)
‡ Refers to 40-yard dash; Note: In many cases, Scout, Rivals, 247Sports, On3, and ESPN may conflict in their listings of height, weight and 40 time.; In these cases, the average was taken. ESPN grades are on a 100-point scale.; Sources: "2006 Oklahoma Football Commitment List". Rivals.; "2006 Oklahoma College Football Recruiting Commits". Scout.; "Scout.com Team Recruiting Rankings". Scout.; "2006 Team Ranking". Rivals.com.

== College career ==
=== Freshman season ===
Bradford received an athletic scholarship to attend the University of Oklahoma, where he played for coach Bob Stoops's Oklahoma Sooners football team. He redshirted as a freshman in 2006. The same year, Oklahoma's starting quarterback Rhett Bomar, then a sophomore, was dismissed from the team for violating NCAA rules. Paul Thompson, a senior quarterback-turned-wide receiver, converted back to quarterback and led the 2006 Oklahoma Sooners football team to win the Big 12 Championship Game. His departure left a void at the quarterback position at Oklahoma. Six players on the roster tried out for the starting position during the following off-season, including three walk-on quarterbacks, true freshman Keith Nichol (a Rivals.com 4-star recruit and 6th-ranked dual-threat quarterback in the 2007 recruiting class, who later transferred to Michigan State University), junior Joey Halzle (the only one with game experience), and Bradford. On August 21, 2007, Bradford won the starting quarterback role for the 2007 team.

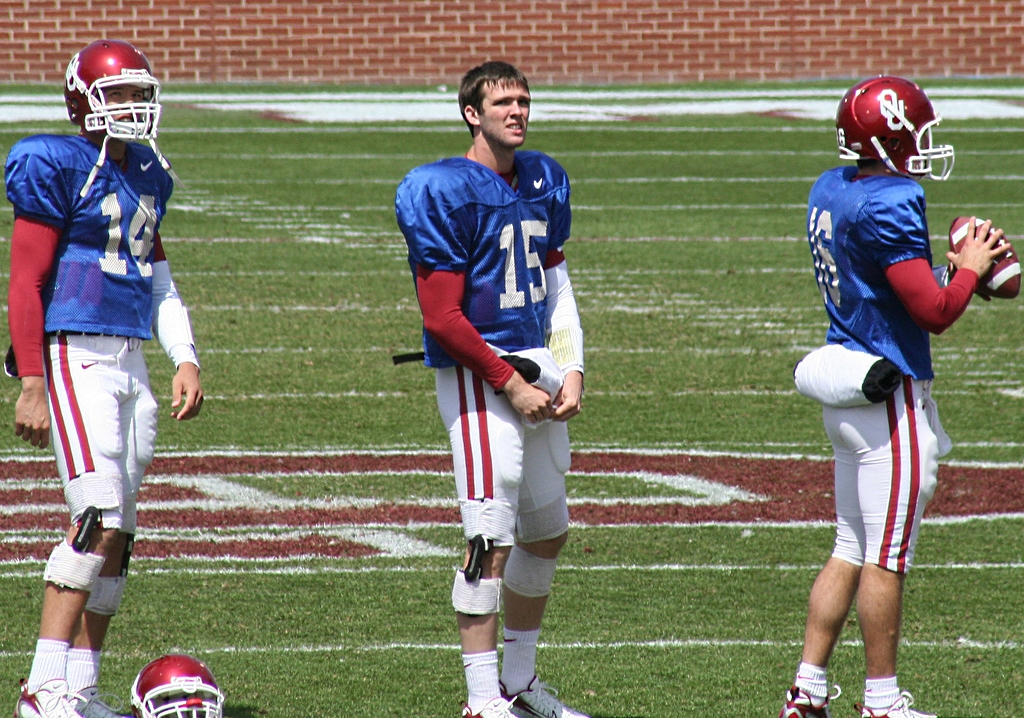
Bradford (left), Joey Halzle (center), and Hays McEachern (right) during spring practice in April 2007

In his first game for the Sooners, against the University of North Texas, Bradford completed 21 of 23 passing attempts for 363 yards and three touchdowns in a little over two quarters, breaking the school record for passing yards in a half, held by his quarterback coach Josh Heupel, with 350. The very next game, Bradford broke Heisman Trophy winner Jason White's school record for most consecutive pass completions with 22 (18 came in the first half and 4 at the start of the second).

In the second week of the 2007 season, Bradford was named the college national offensive player of the week by the Walter Camp Football Foundation after tying the school record for most touchdown passes in a game with five. Having thrown 25 touchdowns through his first nine games, Bradford was on pace to break the NCAA freshman record of 29 touchdowns set by David Neill in 1998 and tied by Colt McCoy in 2006.

In the November 17, 2007, game against Texas Tech, Bradford suffered a concussion. He was removed from the game and replaced by back-up quarterback Joey Halzle. The Sooners lost the game, 27–34. Bradford was able to play in the Bedlam game against Oklahoma State a week later. During the game against the Oklahoma State Cowboys, Bradford broke the NCAA freshman record of 29 touchdowns by passing his 30th touchdown to Joe Jon Finley during the second quarter. At the Missouri Tigers game, Bradford threw for 209 yards and 0 interceptions. He was 18–26 and threw for two touchdowns.

The Sooners won the Big 12 Championship after defeating Missouri for the second time in a season. The Sooners played the West Virginia Mountaineers in the Fiesta Bowl on January 2, 2008, and lost 48–28. Bradford led the nation with a passer rating of 176.5.

=== Sophomore season ===
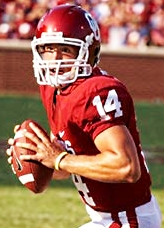
Bradford during the 2008 NCAA season

The following season Bradford surpassed quarterback coach Josh Heupel's school record for passing yards in a single game with 468 yards. Bradford led the Sooners to their third straight Big 12 Championship and defeated Missouri 62–21. In the process, the Sooners broke Hawaii's 2006 record for the most points in a single season with 702 points. Also, the Sooners were the first team in NCAA history to score 60 or more points in five straight games. Oklahoma finished the 2008 regular season with a 12–1 record, ranking #2 in the AP Poll and #1 in the BCS Standings. The Sooners earned a trip to play Florida at the 2009 BCS National Championship Game. Bradford turned in one of the best seasons ever by a quarterback, passing for 4,720 yards with an NCAA-leading 50 touchdowns and just eight interceptions.

After the regular season, Bradford captured the Davey O'Brien Award and the Heisman Trophy, awarded to the best player in college football. He is the second sophomore, after 2007 winner Tim Tebow of the University of Florida, to receive the Heisman; he also became the fifth University of Oklahoma player, as well as the second person of Native American descent to capture the trophy after Jim Plunkett. Bradford received 1,726 total points while the other finalists, Colt McCoy, of the University of Texas, and Tim Tebow, received 1,604 and 1,575, respectively. Tebow, however, collected more first-place votes, 309, while Bradford got 300. Bradford got the most points thanks to the help of his 315 second-place votes. A total of 926 voters participated in the balloting.

When combined with Blake Griffin's Naismith Award, Oklahoma became the first school to have a winner in both top basketball and football individual awards in the same year. Bradford was also voted Associated Press College Football Player of the Year. Bradford received 27 votes, again beating McCoy (17 votes) and Tim Tebow (16 votes). Bradford is the third Oklahoma Sooner to win the award, joining Josh Heupel (2000) and Jason White (2003). Heupel and White were also quarterbacks, with Heupel being the current quarterbacks coach for Oklahoma.

Bradford faced Florida, led by Tebow, in the 2009 BCS National Championship Game. He threw 26-of-41 passes for 256 yards, two touchdowns, and two interceptions, as Florida won the game 24–14.

=== Junior season ===
Bradford announced that he would forgo the 2009 NFL draft to return to Oklahoma for his junior season. In the Sooners' first game of the season (against Brigham Young), Bradford suffered a third-degree AC joint sprain one play after becoming Oklahoma's all-time passing leader. Playing without Bradford for the second half of the game, Oklahoma went on to lose 14–13. Bradford was scheduled to return in about three to six weeks. After missing three weeks, Bradford returned to the field during the Baylor game, and completed 27 of 49 passes for 389 yards and one touchdown, leading the Sooners to a 33–7 victory. Bradford re-injured his right shoulder on October 17, 2009, in the Red River Rivalry against Texas on the second drive of the game. It was later announced that he would undergo season-ending shoulder surgery and enter the 2010 NFL draft.

== Professional career ==
=== Pre-draft ===
Although he likely would have been one of the first quarterbacks taken in the 2009 NFL Draft, Bradford decided to return to Oklahoma for his junior season in January 2009. Shortly after the 2009 draft, he was projected as the No. 1 prospect for the 2010 NFL Draft. On October 25, 2009, Bradford announced he would forgo his final year at Oklahoma and enter the draft. Commonly considered one of the top prospects available, Bradford was projected as high as the No. 1 overall pick for most of the preseason and the early part of the regular season.

Because of his shoulder injury, Bradford did not throw at the 2010 NFL Combine, however he was measured and participated in interviews and medical examinations. He was measured at 6 ft 4 1/4 in (1.937 m) and 236 lb (107 kg), about 15 lb (6.8 kg) above his college playing weight. Bradford scored 36 out of 50 on the Wonderlic test, well above the average of 28.5 for the 30 NFL quarterbacks slated to start in 2010.

On March 19, Bradford met with the St. Louis Rams, who held the first overall pick, general manager Billy Devaney and offensive coordinator Pat Shurmur in Pensacola, Florida, where he had been training and rehabbing since undergoing surgery on his throwing shoulder.

External videos
- Sam Bradford at the NFL Combine
- Bradford gets drafted by St. Louis

Pre-draft measurables
Height	Weight	Arm length	Hand span	40-yard dash	Wonderlic
6 ft 4 1/4 in (1.94 m)	236 lb (107 kg)	34 3/8 in (0.87 m)	9 1/2 in (0.24 m)	4.70 s	36
All values from NFL Combine

=== St. Louis Rams ===
==== 2010 season ====
Bradford in 2010

In early spring, Bradford met with Thom Goudy, a professional development coach in St. Louis, Missouri. Goudy helped Bradford with his pocket technique. Bradford spent three weeks in his training camp before starting the summer conditioning camp. On April 22, 2010, Bradford was selected by the St. Louis Rams as the first overall pick in the 2010 NFL draft. It was the first time the Rams selected a quarterback in the first round of a draft since the selection of Bill Munson in the 1964 NFL draft. Bradford was the first No. 1 pick out of Oklahoma since Billy Sims was selected first overall by the Detroit Lions in the 1980 NFL draft. Bradford chose the #8 in honor to Troy Aikman who also attended Oklahoma before transferring to UCLA. On July 30, 2010, Bradford signed a six-year, $78 million deal, which had $50 million of guarantees and a maximum value of $86 million which made it the largest contract ever for an NFL rookie.

On August 14, in a loss against the Minnesota Vikings to open the preseason, Bradford went 6-of-13 for 57 yards and was sacked 3 times. After another unimpressive showing against the Browns in his second game, Bradford had a better performance against the Patriots in the third game of the preseason. He got his first start in place of the injured A. J. Feeley, throwing two first half touchdowns and helping lead the Rams to a 36–35 victory.

He competed for the starting quarterback position with Feeley and on September 4, Bradford was named the starting quarterback for the 2010 season opener. On September 12, in his first regular season start, Bradford completed 32 of 55 passes for 253 yards, with 1 touchdown and 3 interceptions in a 17–13 loss to the Arizona Cardinals. His first NFL touchdown came on a 1-yard pass to Laurent Robinson. Two weeks later, he led the team to a 30–16 victory over Washington, his first victory as an NFL starter. The win also snapped a 13-game overall home losing streak for St. Louis. The next week, he passed for 289 yards and two touchdowns in a 20–3 win over Seattle. This was the team's first win in a division game since November 2007.

In Week 8 against the Carolina Panthers, Bradford completed 25 of 32 passes, two of them for touchdowns. In his first eight games, he scored eleven touchdowns, tying an NFL record—held by Dan Marino (1983), Peyton Manning (1998), and Ben Roethlisberger (2004)—for touchdowns by a rookie over that span since the 1970 AFL–NFL merger. Bradford went 3–2 as a starter in October, passing for 1,019 yards and 7 touchdowns against 3 interceptions. He was named the NFL's Offensive Rookie of the Month.

During October and November, he established a record for most consecutive passes without an interception for a rookie (169), which ended during the November 21 home game against the Atlanta Falcons with an interception by William Moore. On November 28, against the Denver Broncos, Bradford became the first rookie in NFL history to pass for at least 300 yards and three touchdowns with no interceptions during a road victory. He capped November by becoming the first rookie quarterback to win two consecutive Offensive Rookie of the Month awards.

On December 26, Bradford surpassed Peyton Manning's record for most completed passes by an NFL rookie quarterback (326). Bradford finished the season with 354 completions out of 590 attempts, surpassing Manning's record of 575 for most attempts by an NFL rookie quarterback. Bradford became just the third rookie quarterback to start all 16 regular season games and pass over 3,000 passing yards, joining Manning and Matt Ryan. He was named to the PFWA All-Rookie Team, becoming the fourth Rams quarterback to claim this award, joining Dieter Brock (1985), Jim Everett (1986), and Tony Banks.

==== 2011 season ====
Coming into the 2011 season, expectations were high for the St. Louis Rams and Bradford. After going 4–0 in the preseason, it appeared as if they would be fulfilled, but once the regular season happened injuries ravaged the roster. A high ankle sprain bothered Bradford for the majority of the year and he finished with 2,164 passing yards, six touchdowns, and six interceptions. The team went 1–9 in games he appeared in and had a 2–14 record overall.

==== 2012 season ====
During the off-season, there was much speculation that the Rams would select Heisman Trophy winner and former Baylor quarterback Robert Griffin III. But new head coach Jeff Fisher instilled hope that Bradford was still the Rams franchise quarterback, solidifying this hope when the Rams later reached a deal with the Washington Redskins for the 2nd overall selection in the 2012 NFL draft.

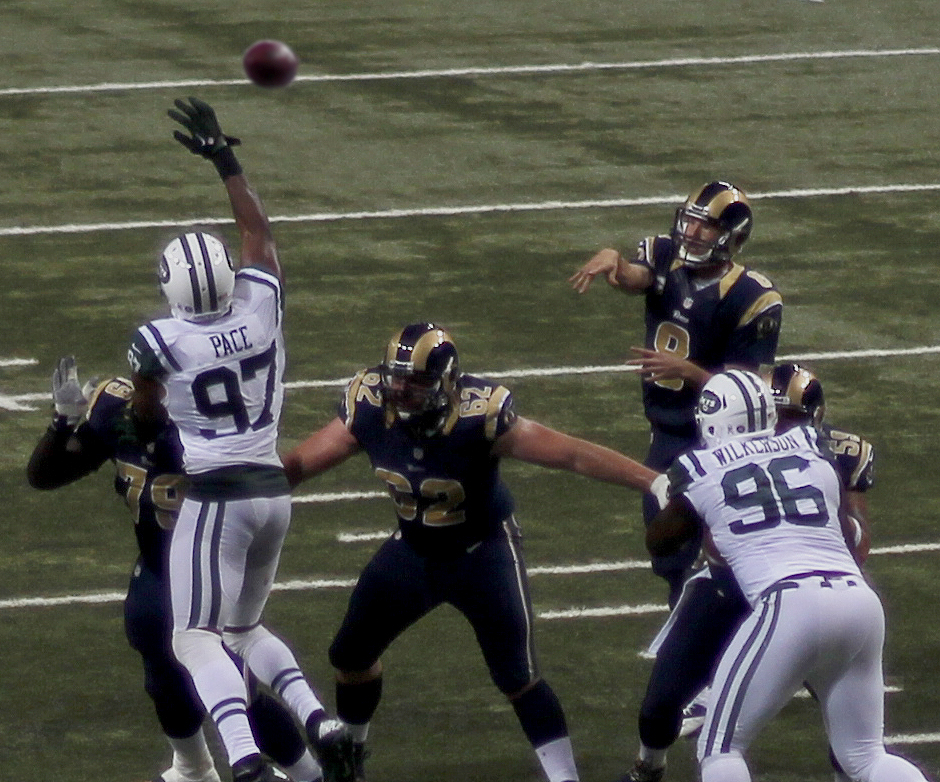
Bradford throwing against the New York Jets in 2012

The Rams were not expected to make much of a leap following their dismal campaign the year before, but behind strong play by Bradford and rookies stepping up to the challenge, the Rams finished 7–8–1. In Week 2, against the Washington Redskins, he finished with 310 passing yards, three touchdowns, and one interception in the 31–28 victory. In Week 15, against the Minnesota Vikings, he had 377 passing yards, three touchdowns, and one interception in the 36–22 loss. Bradford finished the season with career best numbers: 3,702 passing yards, 21 touchdowns compared to 13 interceptions and an 82.6 passer rating to go along with 59.5 completion percentage.

==== 2013 season ====
After adding players in the offseason including offensive tackle Jake Long, tight end Jared Cook, receiver Tavon Austin, and linebacker Alec Ogletree, some analysts expected the Rams and Bradford to excel in 2013. However, other analysts believed that they would finish with a record close to .500. The season started off on a positive note with a 27–24 victory over the Arizona Cardinals. In the game, Bradford had 299 passing yards, two touchdowns, and an interception. In the next game against the Atlanta Falcons, he had 352 passing yards, three touchdowns, and one interception as the Rams fell 31–24. After two losses to the Dallas Cowboys and San Francisco 49ers, he had 222 passing yards and three touchdowns in a 34–20 victory over the Jacksonville Jaguars. For the second straight game, he threw for three touchdowns in a 38–13 victory over the Houston Texans. However, during the Rams' Week 7 game against the Carolina Panthers, Bradford tore his left ACL on a run out of bounds after a hit from safety Mike Mitchell, ending his season. On the 2013 season, Bradford passed for 1,687 yards and 14 touchdowns to 4 interceptions and 90.9 passer rating. The Rams missed the playoffs with a 7–9 record.

==== 2014 season ====
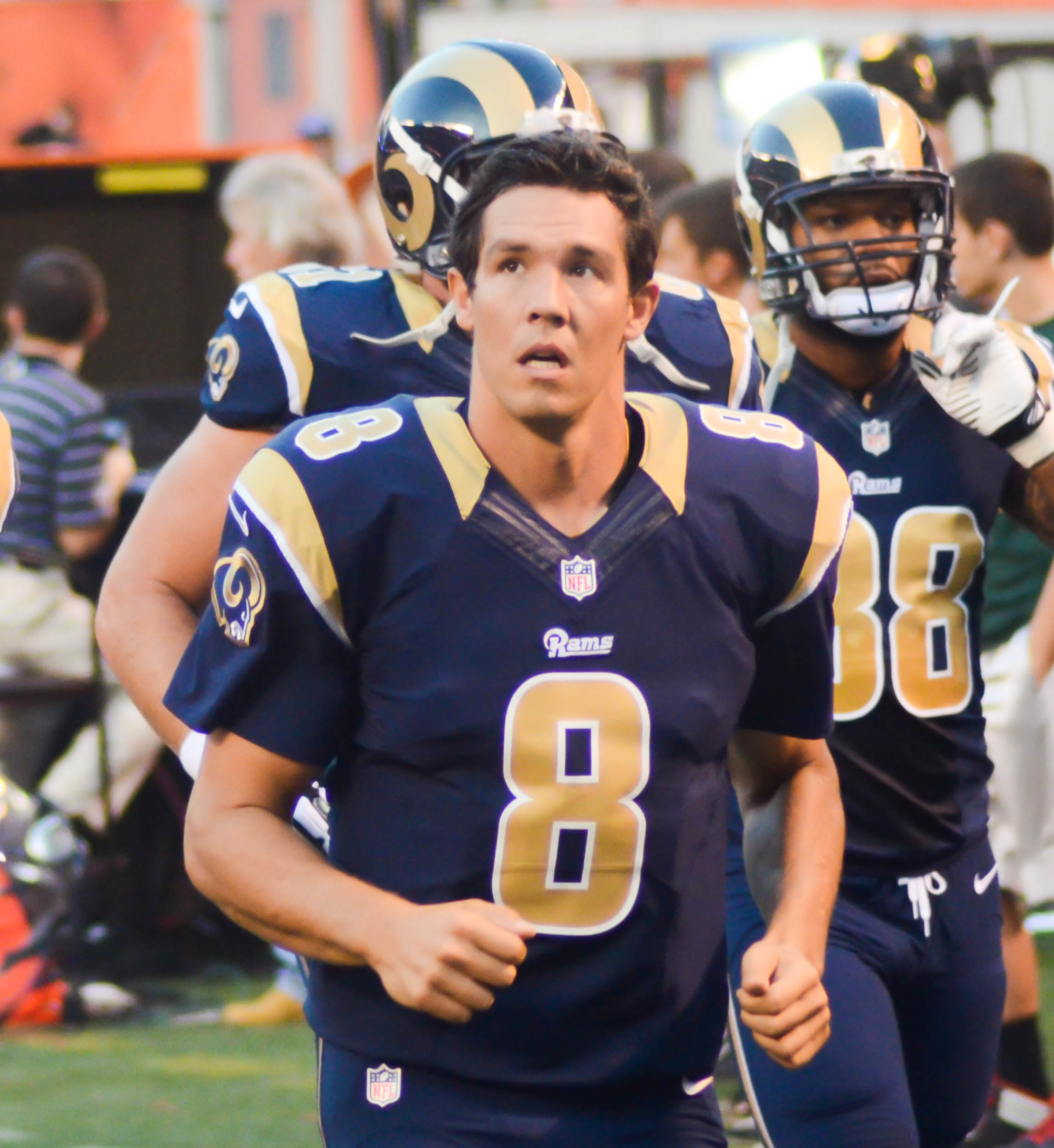
Bradford in 2014

Bradford suffered an injury to the same ACL after being sacked during a preseason game against the Cleveland Browns and missed the entire 2014 season.

=== Philadelphia Eagles ===
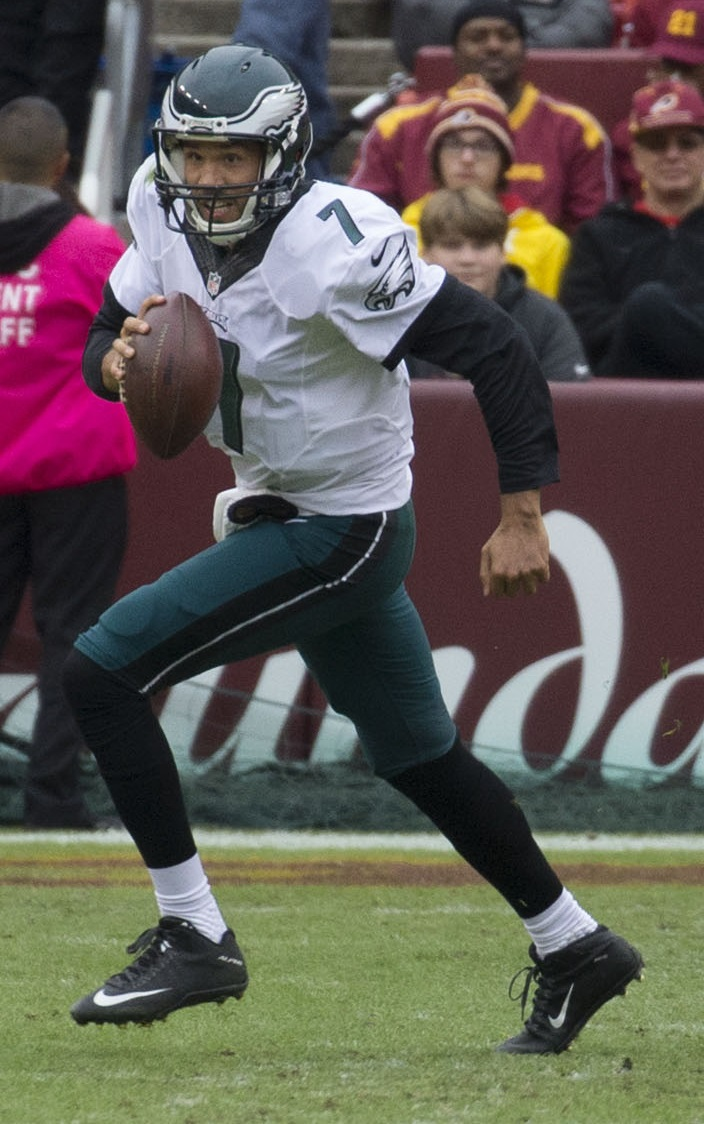
Bradford with the Philadelphia Eagles in 2015

On March 10, 2015, Bradford was traded to the Philadelphia Eagles along with a 2015 fifth-round pick, in exchange for Nick Foles, a 2015 fourth-round pick, and a 2016 second-round pick. In his first game as a Philadelphia Eagle, Bradford completed 36 out of 52 passes for a touchdown and two interceptions in a season opening 26–24 loss to the Atlanta Falcons. In Week 4, he threw three touchdowns with zero interceptions, and although his completion percentage was lower than 55% in both games, he still mustered a 122.6 passer rating in a loss to the Redskins, his only passer rating above 90 for the season. In Week 6, he threw three interceptions, but the Eagles still gained a 27–7 win over the New York Giants to move Philadelphia to 3–3 and first place in the NFC East, mainly thanks to the defense and run game. Bradford had his worst game by far in a loss against the Panthers, where he completed only 56.5% of his passes with zero touchdowns, one interception, and a quarterback rating of 58.7. Against the Miami Dolphins on November 15, Bradford suffered a left shoulder injury as well as a concussion, which would keep him out of the next two games against Tampa Bay and a Thanksgiving Day game against Detroit. In his first season, Bradford would go 7–7 as a starter and his play began to improve after Week 9 against the Dallas Cowboys. Before Week 9, Bradford had been playing poorly through his first seven games, but Eagles coach Chip Kelly would not bench him, and during Week 9, Bradford threw a game-winning touchdown in overtime to Jordan Matthews. In Week 13, Bradford led the Eagles to a 35–28 upset over the New England Patriots. In Week 15, Bradford threw for 361 yards, two touchdowns, and two interceptions in a 40–17 loss to the Arizona Cardinals. In Week 16, he threw for 380 yards and a touchdown in a 38–24 loss to the Washington Redskins. In the regular season finale against the New York Giants, he threw for 320 yards, two touchdowns, and one interception in the 35–30 victory. The Eagles finished with a 7–9 record and missed the playoffs.

On March 1, 2016, Bradford signed a 2-year, $36 million ($26 million guaranteed) contract extension with the Eagles. However, the Eagles traded with the Cleveland Browns for the number two pick in the 2016 NFL draft, in order to draft a new quarterback. This led to speculation that Bradford would be traded or used as a stopgap while Chase Daniel educated the newly drafted quarterback in new head coach Doug Pederson's offensive scheme. On April 25, 2016, it was reported that Bradford wanted to be traded and that he would no longer attend the team's off-season activities. The Eagles selected quarterback Carson Wentz with the second overall pick in the 2016 draft on April 28. Bradford returned to the team in May 2016.

=== Minnesota Vikings ===
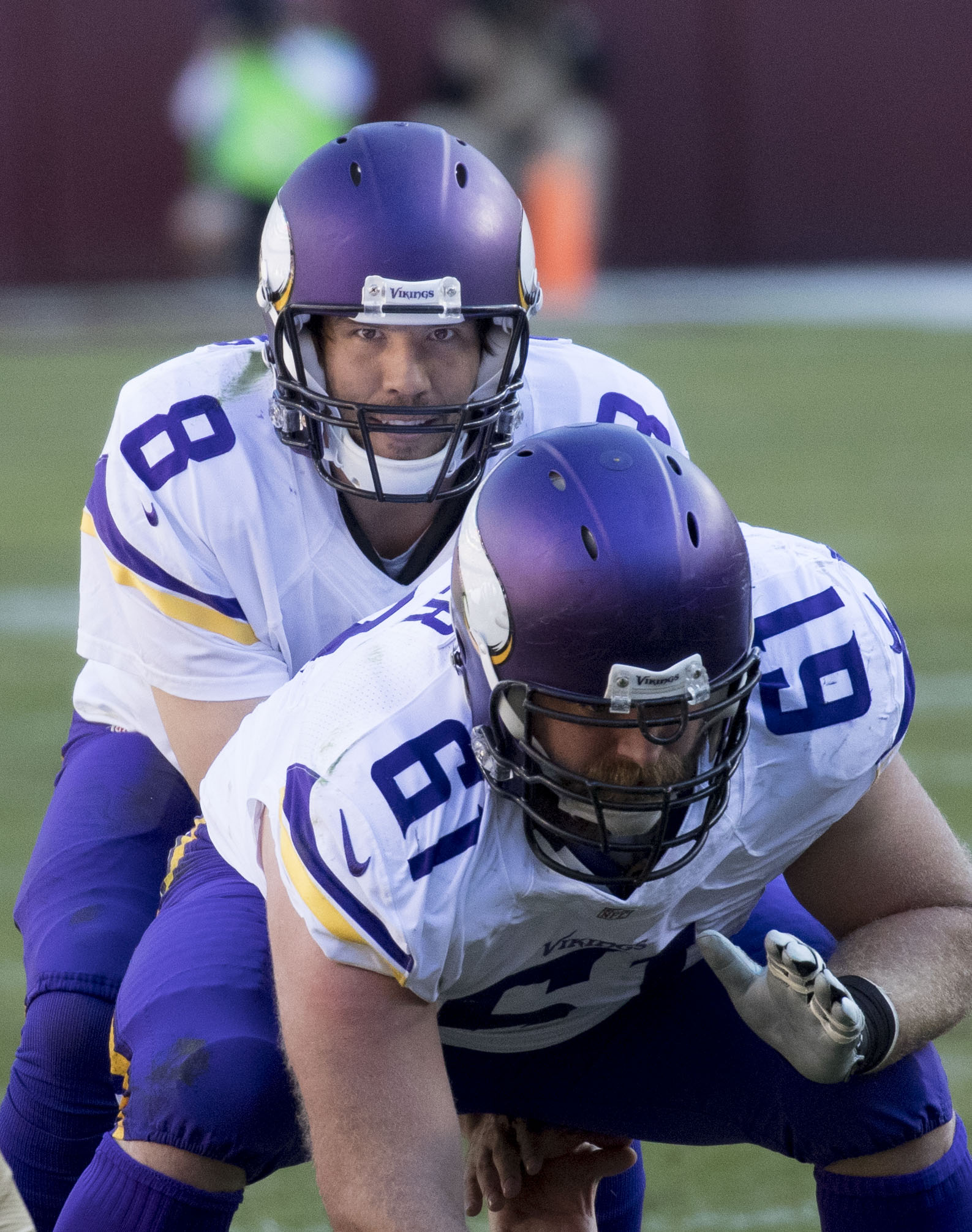
Bradford (No. 8) with the Minnesota Vikings in 2016

==== 2016 season ====
On September 3, 2016, following his appearance in the Eagles' preseason games, Bradford was traded to the Minnesota Vikings for a first-round pick in the 2017 NFL draft (later used to select Derek Barnett) and a conditional fourth-round pick in the 2018 NFL draft. The trade was made after Vikings quarterback Teddy Bridgewater suffered a season-ending ACL tear during team practice on August 30, 2016.

Fifteen days after being traded, Bradford made his first start for the Vikings in Week 2 against the Green Bay Packers, despite not having much time to learn the offense. Bradford ended up hurting his left hand in the first half due to a hit by Clay Matthews. Bradford finished the game completing 22 of 31 passes for 286 yards and two touchdowns, helping lead the Vikings to their first win in their new stadium. His first touchdown as a Viking came in the second quarter on an eight-yard pass to tight end Kyle Rudolph in the back of the end zone, while the second touchdown of the night was a 25-yarder to Stefon Diggs late in the third quarter that gave the Vikings a 17–7 lead. The connection between both players resulted in 182 yards on 9 catches for Diggs, a career-high for him. Bradford received high praise from the media, with many calling it one of the best games of his career. The following week, Bradford threw for 171 yards and one touchdown in a 22–10 win against the Carolina Panthers, thanks to a strong Vikings' defense that sacked Cam Newton eight times and intercepted him three times. In the Vikings' win over the New York Giants in Week 4, Bradford threw a touchdown pass and did not throw an interception for the third straight game. The only other Vikings player to do that in each of his first three games of a season was Randall Cunningham in 1998. With both starting tackles and Stefon Diggs (Vikings' leading receiver) out for a Week 5 game against the Houston Texans, Bradford delivered another strong performance, completing 22 of 30 passes for 271 yards, two touchdowns and, for the fourth straight start, not a single interception. In the opening drive, he connected with Adam Thielen on a 36-yard touchdown strike. During the first quarter of a Week 9 game against the Detroit Lions, Bradford achieved the statistical oddity of completing a pass to himself. His throw was batted into the air by Lions defensive tackle Tyrunn Walker, but Bradford caught the ball and ran towards the sideline, gaining five yards.

During a three-game losing streak, Bradford threw only three touchdowns and an interception with 725 yards and a 66% completion percentage, poor in comparison with the previous four games, in which he threw for 990 yards, six touchdowns, no interceptions, and had a 70% completion percentage. The Vikings would finish the season with an 8–8 record.

Bradford started 15 games in 2016, completing 395 of 552 passes for 3,877 yards and 20 touchdowns with five interceptions. His 71.6 completion percentage set a single season NFL record, passing Drew Brees's 2011 mark of 71.2. Brees later finished the 2017 season with a 72.0 completion percentage, retaking the record. Bradford's 395 completions set a franchise record for completions in a season.

==== 2017 season ====
In Week 1, Bradford completed 27 of 32 pass attempts for 346 yards and 3 touchdowns in a 29–19 win over the New Orleans Saints, earning him his first NFC Offensive Player of the Week award. He was inactive for the Week 2 game against the Pittsburgh Steelers, the first of three games missed due to a knee injury. In Week 5, Bradford made his second and final start of the season, going 5-for-11 for 36 yards before being relieved by Case Keenum late in the second quarter of a 20-17 Vikings victory over the Chicago Bears. One day later, on October 10, it was revealed that Bradford was diagnosed with wear and tear on his knee after two previous ACL surgeries. On November 7, Bradford underwent a knee scope, putting his season in jeopardy. He was placed on injured reserve the next day, ending his season. On January 13, 2018, Bradford was activated off injured reserve to the active roster for the Divisional Round of the playoffs against the New Orleans Saints. Case Keenum, who had gone 10–1 as the Vikings' quarterback since relieving Bradford a second time, remained the starter for the postseason. Bradford did not see action in either of Minnesota's two playoff games.

=== Arizona Cardinals ===
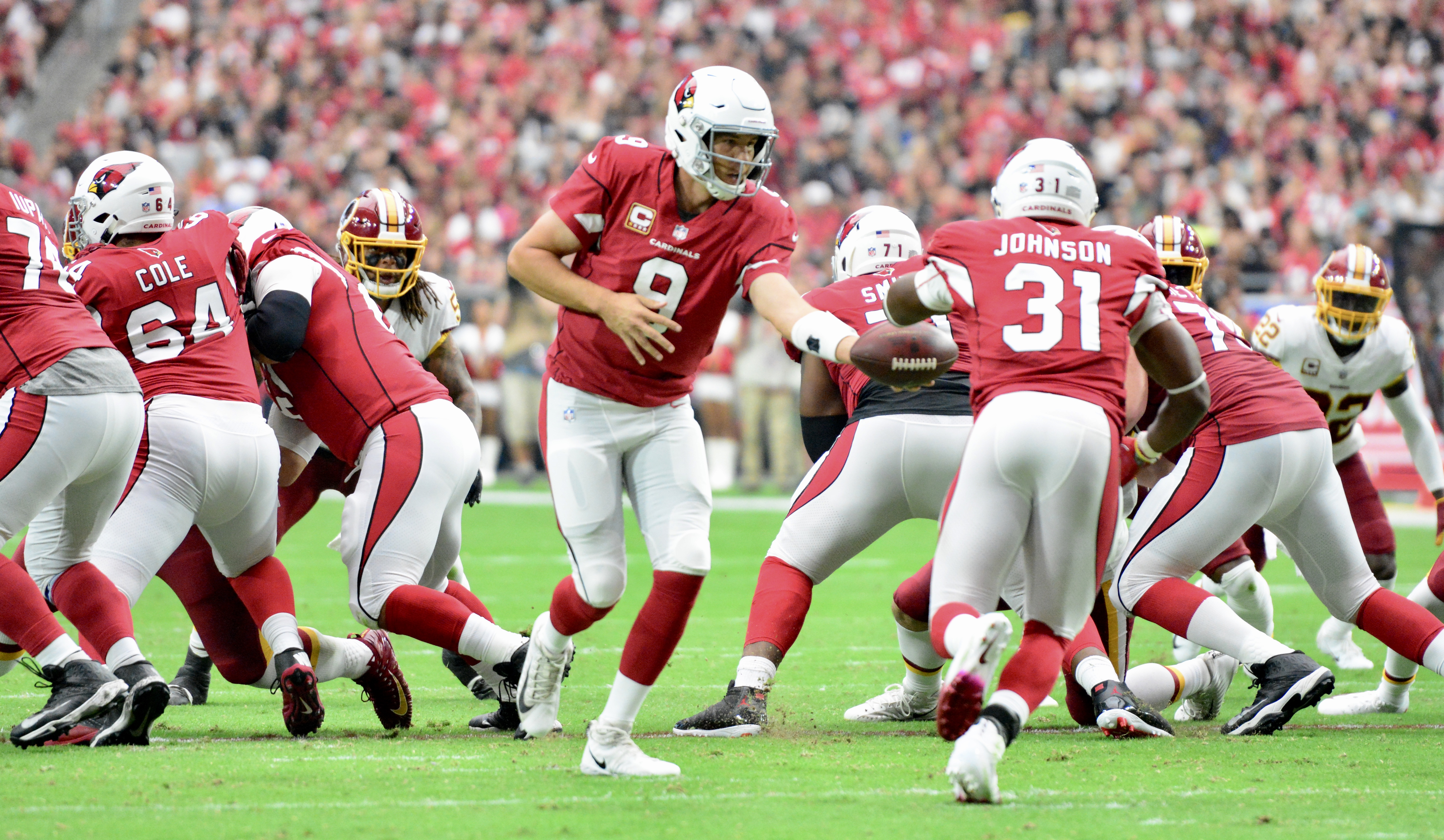
Bradford with the Arizona Cardinals in 2018

On March 16, 2018, Bradford signed a two-year contract with the Arizona Cardinals worth up to $20 million the first year with $15 million guaranteed with a potential out after 2018. Bradford wore number 9 with the Cardinals, since the number 8 was retired in honor of Hall of Fame safety Larry Wilson. After ineffective performances in the first two games, both blowout losses, Bradford was pulled in favor of rookie Josh Rosen in the final moments of a Week 3 loss to the Chicago Bears.

As the Cardinals decided to keep Rosen as their starting quarterback, Bradford was inactive for the next five weeks before ultimately being released on November 3, 2018.

Bradford did not play again after his release. In a 2023 interview, he lamented the injuries sustained throughout his career but was "so blessed to have an opportunity being in the NFL and that it was up to me to make the most of every day and to go out there and give it everything I had. I think I did that."

== Career statistics ==
Legend
	Led the league
**Bold**	Career high

=== NFL ===
==== Regular season ====
Year	Team	Games			Passing								Rushing				Sacks		Fumbles	
Year	Team	GP	GS	Record	Cmp	Att	Pct	Yds	Y/A	TD	Int	Rtg	Att	Yds	Avg	TD	Sck	Yds	Fum	Lost
2010	STL	16	16	7–9	354	**590**	60.0	3,512	6.0	18	**15**	76.5	27	63	2.3	**1**	34	244	7	2
2011	STL	10	10	1–9	191	357	53.5	2,164	6.1	6	6	70.5	18	26	1.4	0	36	248	**10**	**7**
2012	STL	16	16	7–8–1	328	551	59.5	3,702	6.7	**21**	13	82.6	**36**	**124**	3.4	**1**	35	233	7	1
2013	STL	7	7	3–4	159	262	60.7	1,687	6.4	14	4	90.9	15	31	2.1	0	15	97	3	1
2014	STL	0	0	—	Did not play due to injury															
2015	PHI	14	14	**7–7**	346	532	65.0	3,725	7.0	19	14	86.4	26	39	1.5	0	28	200	**10**	3
2016	MIN	15	15	7–8	**395**	552	71.6	**3,877**	7.0	20	5	99.3	20	53	2.7	0	**37**	**276**	**10**	5
2017	MIN	2	2	2–0	32	43	**74.4**	382	**8.9**	3	0	**124.4**	2	−3	−1.5	0	5	40	0	0
2018	ARI	3	3	0–3	50	80	62.5	400	5.0	2	4	62.5	2	7	**3.5**	0	6	33	3	2
Career		83	83	34–48–1	1,855	2,967	62.5	19,449	6.6	103	61	84.5	146	340	2.3	2	196	1,371	50	21

=== College ===
Legend
Led the NCAA

Season	Team	Games			Passing								Rushing			
Season	Team	GP	GS	Record	Cmp	Att	Pct	Yds	Avg	TD	INT	Rtg	Att	Yds	Avg	TD
2006	Oklahoma	Redshirt														
2007	Oklahoma	14	14	11–3	237	341	**69.5**	3,121	9.2	36	**8**	176.5	31	7	0.2	0
2008	Oklahoma	14	14	**12–2**	**328**	**483**	67.9	**4,721**	**9.8**	**50**	**8**	**180.8**	**42**	**47**	**1.1**	**5**
2009	Oklahoma	3	3	1–2	39	69	56.5	562	8.1	2	0	134.5	4	−18	-4.5	0
Career		31	31	24–7	604	893	67.6	8,403	9.4	88	16	175.6	77	36	0.5	5

== Career highlights ==
=== Awards and honors ===
NFL

- NFL Offensive Rookie of the Year (2010)
- NFL completion percentage leader (2016)

College

- 2007 Sporting News Freshman of the Year
- 2007 Second-team All-American by Sporting News
- 2007 Honorable mention All-American
- 2007 NCAA passer rating leader
- 2007 All-Big 12 honorable mention by the league's coaches
- 2007 All-Big 12 Academic Team
- 2008 Second-team Academic All-American by ESPN the Magazine
- 2008 All-Big 12 Academic Team
- 2008 Big 12 Offensive Player of the Year as named by the league's coaches
- 2008 First-team All-American
- 2008 Davey O'Brien Award Winner
- 2008 Heisman Trophy winner
- 2008 Associated Press College Football Player of the Year
- 2008 Sammy Baugh Trophy
- 2008 co-Sporting News Player of the Year
- 2008 Harley Award
- 2008 Touchdown Club of Columbus Quarterback of the Year
- 2008 NCAA passing touchdowns leader
- 2008 NCAA passer rating leader
- 2023 American Indian Athletic Hall of Fame Inductee, Class of 2023
- 2026 Oklahoma Sports Hall of Fame, Class of 2026

=== Records ===
Philadelphia Eagles records

- Most pass completions, game (37, tied with Mark Sanchez)

Minnesota Vikings records

- Most passing yards in a quarterback's first game as a Viking (286)

== Post-playing career ==
Bradford has generally maintained a private lifestyle since retiring from football, preferring to spend time with his family. In 2024, he became a minority owner in the Good Day Farm Cantrell marijuana dispensary in Little Rock, Arkansas.

A scratch golfer, he enjoys playing golf recreationally to maintain his competitive spirit. In 2025, Bradford and his friend Ben Branch qualified the U.S. Amateur Four-Ball tournament, where they were eliminated in stroke play.

After Oklahoma athletic director Joe Castiglione announced his retirement in 2025, Bradford was part of a 13-person committee to help find his successor. The search led to Roger Denny, who Bradford praised for his "rare skill set, with proven success in the legal world".

== Personal life ==
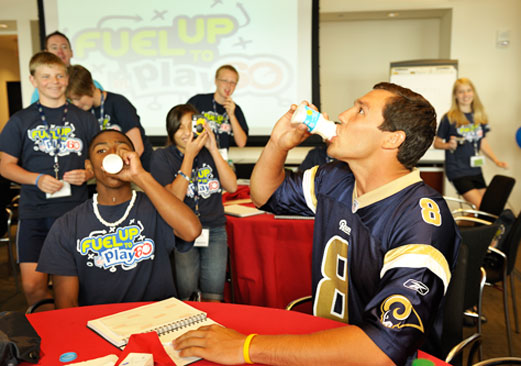
Bradford in 2011

Bradford is a citizen of the Cherokee Nation, tracing his lineage via the federal government's Dawes Rolls. Bradford was the first member of the Cherokee Nation to start at quarterback for a Division I university since Sonny Sixkiller, who played for the University of Washington during the 1970–1972 seasons. On April 28, 2023, he was inducted into the American Indian Athletic Hall of Fame at the First Americans Museum in Oklahoma City, Oklahoma. His father, Kent Bradford, was an offensive lineman for the Sooners from 1977 to 1978.

Bradford is an avid ice hockey fan. His favorite team is the Vancouver Canucks. Bradford was also a basketball player in high school.

Bradford, a Christian, appeared in a short film of video testimonials from celebrities called I Am Second, sharing his faith about Christianity and winning the Heisman Trophy. In 2009, Oklahoma City mayor Mick Cornett declared January 13 as "Sam Bradford Day" in Oklahoma City.

Bradford got engaged to his future wife, Emma Lavy, in March 2016. The couple married on July 15, 2016.

== See also ==
- List of NCAA major college football yearly passing leaders
