= The Court (TV series) =

- Genre: Legal drama
- Created by: Tom Schulman; Oliver Goldstick
- Starring: Sally Field; Craig Bierko; Christina Hendricks; Pat Hingle; Miguel Sandoval; Chris Sarandon; Diahann Carroll; Harry Northup; Alfred Dennis; Nicole DeHuff; Hill Harper; Josh Radnor
- Composer: Joel McNeely
- Country of origin: United States
- Original language: English
- No. of seasons: 1
- No. of episodes: 6 (3 unaired)

Production
- Executive producers: Tom Schulman; Oliver Goldstick; John Wells; Carol Flint
- Producers: Lewis Abel; Stephanie Antosca; Andrew Stearn; Sally Field
- Running time: 60 minutes
- Production companies: John Wells Productions; Touchstone Television; Warner Bros. Television

Original release
- Network: ABC
- Release: March 26 – April 9, 2002

The Court is an American legal drama television series created by Oliver Goldstick and Tom Schulman that aired on ABC from March 26 until April 9, 2002.

== Premise ==
The newly appointed Supreme Court Justice Kate Nolan struggles her way through the political aspects of her occupation.

== Cast ==
- Sally Field as Justice Kate Nolan
- Craig Bierko as Harlan Brandt
- Christina Hendricks as Betsy Tyler
- Pat Hingle as Chief Justice Townsend
- Miguel Sandoval as Justice Martinez
- Chris Sarandon as Justice Vorhees
- Diahann Carroll as Justice DeSett
- Harry Northup as Justice Fitzsimmons
- Alfred Dennis as Justice Bernstein
- Nicole DeHuff as Alexis Cameron
- Hill Harper as Christopher Bell
- Josh Radnor as Dylan Hirsch

== Episodes ==
No.	Title	Directed by	Written by	Original release date	Prod. code	U.S. viewers (millions)
1	"Life Sentence"	Jonathan Kaplan	Carol Flint	March 26, 2002	227901	10.00
A TV reporter in Ohio digs for dirt on Kate.
2	"Due Process"	Charles Haid	Bonnie Mark	April 2, 2002	227902	7.90
Nolan gets involved in cases about securities fraud and abortion.
3	"Stay"	Unknown	Story by : Kevin Jon Heller; Teleplay by : Kevin Jon Heller & Carol Flint	April 9, 2002	227904	6.80
A man from Texas is scheduled to be executed for rape and murder.
4	"Snakes in the Grass"	Tom Moore	Janet Tamaro	Unaired	227903	TBD
Nolan is assigned to write the majority opinion on a case involving a federal agent who accidentally shot a state agent.
5	"A Wing and a Prayer"	TBD	Bonnie Mark	Unaired	227905	TBD
Nolan's brother Keith gets her in trouble.
6	"Back in the Bottle"	TBD	Story by : Janet Tamaro & Kevin Jon Heller; Teleplay by : Carol Flint & Janet Tamaro	Unaired	227906	TBD
