= Putnam City North High School =

Coordinates: 35.59185°N 97.63730°W

Location
- 11800 North Rockwell Avenue; Oklahoma City, Oklahoma 73162; United States

Information
- Type: public school
- Motto: "It's a great day to be alive, and it's a great day to be a Panther!"
- Established: 1978
- Locale: Suburban
- School district: Putnam City Schools
- Authority: Oklahoma State Department of Education
- Principal: Thomas McNeely
- Teaching staff: 101.24 (FTE)
- Grades: 9-12
- Enrolment: 1,577 (2023–2024)
- Student to teacher ratio: 15.58
- Colors: Cardinal red and gold
- Mascot: Panther
- Newspaper: The North Star
- Yearbook: PANTHERTRACKS
- Website: Official website

Putnam City North High School (PCN, PC North) is a public high school situated in Northwest Oklahoma City, Oklahoma, United States. It is accredited by the North Central Association of Secondary Schools and is one of three high schools in the Putnam City Schools. Offering education in grades nine through twelve, North is among the highest scoring public schools in Oklahoma, ranging from End of Instruction tests to college admission exams.

== History ==
Putnam City North High School opened its doors August 24, 1978. In its first year, the school took 750 sophomores and juniors from Putnam City High School and Hefner Middle School.

In 1983, the school added a freshman class and became a four-year high school.

== Notable alumni ==
- Sam Bradford, 2008 Heisman Trophy winner, University of Oklahoma quarterback 2007–2009. Number 1 overall pick of the 2010 NFL draft.
- Glenn Coffee, first Republican President Pro Tempore of the Oklahoma Senate
- Robert Crowe, opera singer, musicologist, first male soprano in history to win the Metropolitan Opera Competition
- David Holt, Mayor of Oklahoma City, former Oklahoma State Senator, former Chief of Staff to the Mayor of Oklahoma City, former White House staffer, former aide to U.S. Speaker of the House
- Deji Karim, running back with the Jacksonville Jaguars, 2009 Finalist for Football Championship Subdivision Walter Payton Award
- Jamie Marchi, voice actor
- James Marsden, film actor, becoming well known in the X-Men series, and Westworld.
- Mike Mitchell, film director (Deuce Bigalow: Male Gigolo, Sky High, Surviving Christmas, Shrek Forever After)
- Olivia Munn, film actor (Date Night, Iron Man 2), correspondent on Comedy Central's The Daily Show, co-host of "Attack of the Show!" on the G4 Network, model featured in Maxim (magazine) and Playboy
- Lance Parker, professional soccer player formerly with Chivas USA in MLS and currently with FC Edmonton
- Kristy Wood Starling, Christian recording artist. Finished second place in NBC's Today Show's "Today's Superstar" contest in 2002
- Elizabeth Garrett, former president of Cornell University
