= Warr Acres, Oklahoma =

- City
- City of Warr Acres
- Seal

- Location in Oklahoma County and the state of Oklahoma.

- Location in the United States
- Coordinates: 35°31′42″N 97°37′06″W
- Country: United States
- State: Oklahoma
- County: Oklahoma

Area
  - Total: 2.84 sq mi (7.35 km^{2})
  - Land: 2.80 sq mi (7.26 km^{2})
  - Water: 0.035 sq mi (0.09 km^{2})
- Elevation: 1,319 ft (402 m)

Population (2020)
  - Total: 10,452
  - Density: 3,729.2/sq mi (1,439.86/km^{2})
- Time zone: UTC-6 (Central (CST))
  - Summer (DST): UTC-5 (CDT)
- ZIP codes: 73122, 73123, 73132
- Area code: 405
- FIPS code: 40-78500
- GNIS feature ID: 2412182
- Website: www.warracres-ok.gov

Warr Acres is a city in Oklahoma County, Oklahoma, United States, and a part of the Oklahoma City metropolitan area. It was established after World War II by C.B. Warr, a dynamic businessman, builder, and commercial developer. The population was 10,452 at the 2020 census, a 4.1% increase from 2010.

The Putnam City School District Administration is located in Warr Acres, as are several Putnam City schools including Putnam City High School.

== History ==
The Warr Acres housing addition and Warr Acres Second Addition was developed in 1937 by Clyde B. Warr. An addition that would later form part of the city of Warr Acres, Putnam City was developed by state lawmaker Israel Putnam in 1909.

The city formed when the residents of 11 additions, including Putnam City, petitioned to incorporate in February 1948. The city of Bethany filed suit, but lost in an Oklahoma Supreme Court decision.

As was common in early statehood, Warr Acres was one of several racially segregated communities that used restrictive covenants and extra-legal means to prevent African-Americans from owning properties from its founding through the 1960s.. Warr Acres is currently a racially diverse city.

According to the 2020 U.S. census, the racial composition of Warr Acres was as follows:

- White American: 45.8%
- Hispanic or Latino: 29.1%
- African American: 10.3%
- Native American: 2.4%
- Asian American: 4.1%
- Pacific Islands American: 0.1%
- Some other race: 0.1%
- Multiracial American: 7.9%

Shopping districts appeared along MacArthur Avenue in the 1960s and 1970s. By 1979, the town had grown to almost three-square miles after annexing several residential developments. with shopping districts along MacArthur Blvd and Northwest Expressway, as well as Route 66 (39th Street).

== Geography ==
Warr Acres is a northwest suburb of Oklahoma City. According to the United States Census Bureau, the city has a total area of 2.8 square miles (7.3 km^{2}) centered along N MacArthur Boulevard, of which 2.8 square miles (7.3 km^{2}) is land and 0.04 square miles (0.10 km^{2}) (or 1.06%) is water. The city lies in the Sandstone Hills region of Oklahoma, known for hills of 250 to 400 feet (76 to 122 m) and forests of blackjack oak and post oak.

=== Climate ===
Warr Acres has a humid subtropical climate, with variations in weather daily and seasonally, except during summer, which is consistently hot and humid. Central Oklahoma is subject to droughts and heavy rainfall leading to flash flooding and flooding. Consistent winds help cool the summers and can lead to winter ice storms. Warr Acres is in the center of Tornado Alley and is prone to frequent and severe tornadoes. The Oklahoma City metropolitan area is one of the most tornado-prone major cities in the world. More than 150 tornadoes have struck within the city limits since 1890, including eight rated F4/EF4 and one rated F5.

== Demographics ==
Historical population
| Census | Pop. | Note | %± |
|---|---|---|---|
| 1950 | 2,378 | | — |
| 1960 | 7,135 | | 200.0% |
| 1970 | 9,887 | | 38.6% |
| 1980 | 9,940 | | 0.5% |
| 1990 | 9,288 | | −6.6% |
| 2000 | 9,735 | | 4.8% |
| 2010 | 10,043 | | 3.2% |
| 2020 | 10,452 | | 4.1% |

=== 2020 census ===
As of the 2020 census, Warr Acres had a population of 10,452. The median age was 35.0 years; 26.2% of residents were under the age of 18 and 14.4% were 65 years of age or older. For every 100 females there were 94.4 males, and for every 100 females age 18 and over there were 90.7 males age 18 and over.

100.0% of residents lived in urban areas, while 0% lived in rural areas.

There were 3,944 households in Warr Acres, of which 36.0% had children under the age of 18 living in them. Of all households, 41.4% were married-couple households, 20.0% were households with a male householder and no spouse or partner present, and 31.6% were households with a female householder and no spouse or partner present. About 27.6% of all households were made up of individuals and 10.9% had someone living alone who was 65 years of age or older.

There were 4,387 housing units, of which 10.1% were vacant. Among occupied housing units, 59.6% were owner-occupied and 40.4% were renter-occupied. The homeowner vacancy rate was 1.6% and the rental vacancy rate was 13.1%.

Racial composition as of the 2020 census
| Race | Percent |
|---|---|
| White | 49.7% |
| Black or African American | 10.6% |
| American Indian and Alaska Native | 3.1% |
| Asian | 4.2% |
| Native Hawaiian and Other Pacific Islander | <0.1% |
| Some other race | 14.1% |
| Two or more races | 18.2% |
| Hispanic or Latino (of any race) | 29.1% |

=== 2010 census ===
As of the 2010 census, there were 10,043 people, 3,945 households, and 2,600 families residing in the city. The population density was 3,586.8 people per square mile. Households with children under the age of 18 made up 34.5% of the 3,945 households, 43.5% were married couples living together, 33.9% were non-family households, and 16.4% were occupied by a female householder with no husband present. The average household size was 2.52 and the average family size was 3.07. The population was relatively unchanged since the 2000 census recorded 9,735 people, 3,978 households, and 2,681 families.

The median income for a household in the city was $40,941, and the median income for a family was $50,533. The per capita income for the city was $29,966. About 13.8% of families, 75.2% of employees and 16.6% of the population were below the poverty line, including 30.2% of those under age 18 and 3.3% of those age 65 or over.

=== 2000 census ===
As of the 2000 census, there were 9,735 people, 3,978 households, and 2,681 families residing in the city.

== City government ==
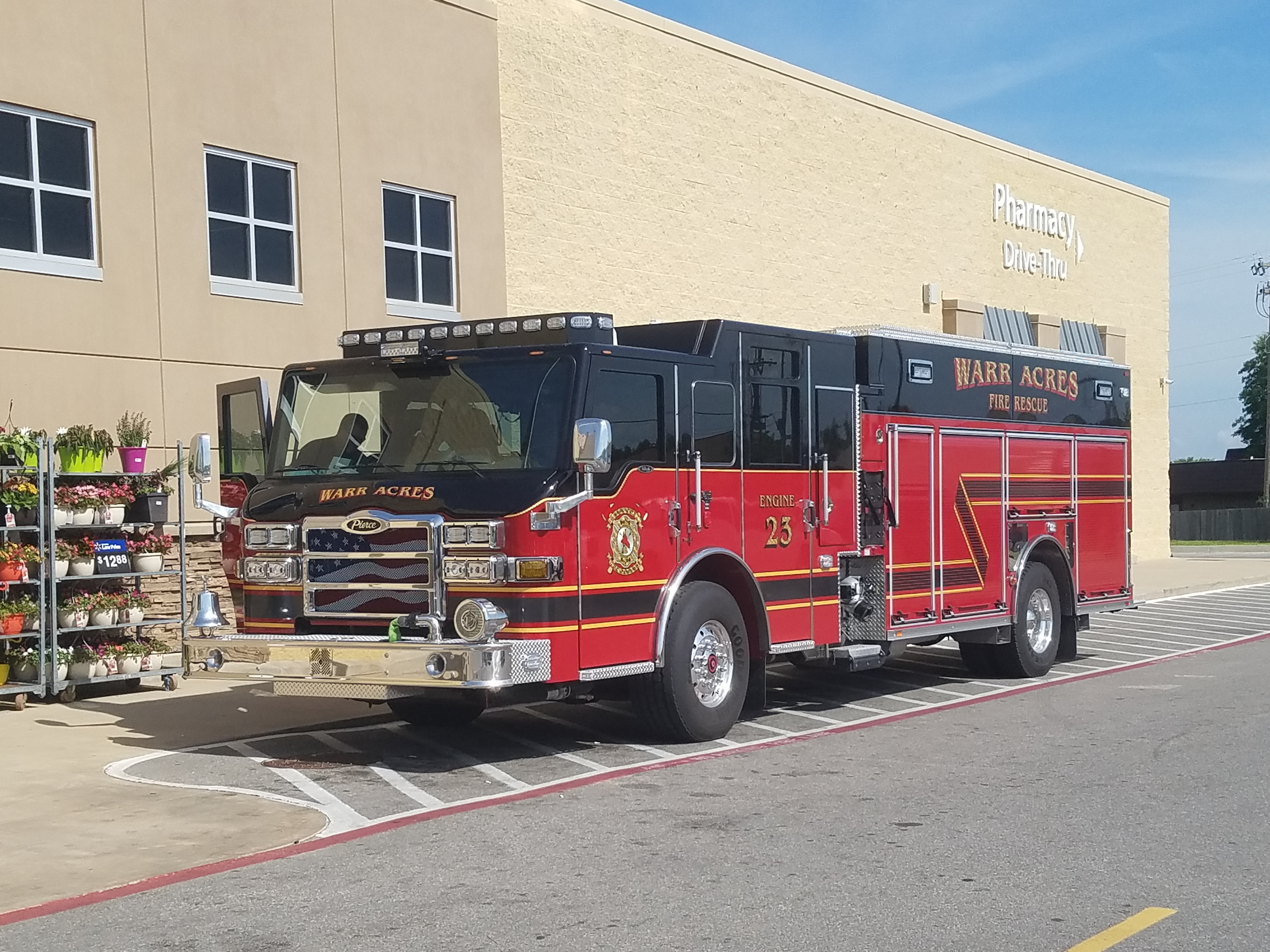
Warr Acres Fire Dept. Engine 23 at a local Walmart Neighborhood Market.

The city provides residents with a fire department, police department, animal control, and sewer and sanitation services. The Warr Acres fire department consists of 20 paid employees that respond to more than 1,800 calls per year. The police department consists of 26 paid employees divided up into patrol, investigative, communications, and administrative divisions. The Patrol Division is the primary contact for citizens.. The city government is the Strong-Mayor type of government with the Mayor performing the duties of Mayor, CEO, and administrator. The city council consists of 8 members, two from each of four wards. The current Mayor is Vickie Douglas, having been elected in Feb., 2025, for a two year term.<https://www.warracres-ok.gov>

== Education ==
As a northwest suburb of Oklahoma City, Warr Acres is close to Oklahoma City University, the Southern Nazarene University, Southwestern Christian University and Oklahoma Christian University.

The city is serviced by the Putnam City School District. Schools in Warr Acres include:

- Putnam City High School
- James L. Capps Middle School
- Central Elementary School

(While located just outside the city limits, Rollingwood Elementary School also serves the area.)

The Putnam City Enrollment Center is also in Warr Acres.

A portion of Warr Acres is zoned to Putnam City West High School in Oklahoma City.

The Roman Catholic Archdiocese of Oklahoma City operates St. Charles Borromeo Catholic K-8 School.

Dove Science Academy, a highly ranked charter school, is located in Warr Acres on Northwest Expressway and has an elementary, middle and high school.<https://www.doveschools.org>
