= Putnam City High School =

Coordinates: 35.522311°N 97.608278°W

Location
- 5300 Northwest 50th Street; Warr Acres, Oklahoma 73122; United States

Information
- Type: Public School
- Established: 1914
- Locale: Suburban
- Authority: OSDE
- Principal: Tami Taylor
- Teaching staff: 103.53 (FTE)
- Grades: 9-12
- Enrollment: 2,002 (2023-2024)
- Student to teacher ratio: 19.34
- Colors: Orange and black
- Mascot: Pirate
- Newspaper: Pirate Log
- Yearbook: Treasure Chest
- District: Putnam City School District
- Website: Official site

Putnam City High School (commonly, PC, Putnam City Original, and PCO) is a secondary school located in Warr Acres, Oklahoma, a northwestern suburb of metropolitan Oklahoma City, United States. It is one of three high schools in the Putnam City School District, and serves more than 1,900 students. It is accredited by the North Central Association of Secondary Schools.

The current school site was founded in 1958, and includes the primary stadium for the Putnam City School District.

== History ==
Putnam City High School's first graduating class had only three students in 1919. The school's current site on Northwest 50th Street was opened in 1958.

== Campus ==
Located at Northwest 50th Street and Ann Arbor Avenue, the school's campus includes a separate building for the instruction of science and history, a large student parking lot, and the district's primary stadium used by three high schools for football, track meets, and other outdoor activities. The school has two band rooms, two cafeterias, and two gymnasiums.

The school district is roughly bounded by Northwest 39th Street on the south, Northwest Expressway on the north, Portland Avenue on the east and County Line Road on the west.

== Marching contest ==
The Putnam City School District hosts an annual marching band contest, known as the Putnam City Marching Classic, at Putnam City High School.

== Notable alumni ==
- Alvan Adams, former professional basketball player (Oklahoma, Phoenix Suns)
- Bill Amis, professional basketball player (Pratt CC, Hawaii, Univ. of Tartu, Keravnos, Steaua București)
- Joe Aska, professional American football player (Central Oklahoma, Oakland Raiders, Indianapolis Colts, New York/New Jersey Hitmen)
- Nicole DeHuff, TV and film actress (Meet the Parents, The Court)
- Stephen Dickson, opera singer
- Andrew Heaney, MLB pitcher for the Texas Rangers
- C.J. Henry, professional baseball player (New York Yankees, Philadelphia Phillies), college basketball player (Memphis, Kansas, Southern Nazarene)
- Xavier Henry, professional basketball player for the Kansas Jayhawks and the New Orleans Hornets
- Phil Johnson, basketball head coach (Northern Oklahoma CC, Seminole JC, San Jose State) basketball assistant coach (East Central, Tulsa, New Orleans, Arizona, Chicago Bulls, USC, UTEP)
- Steve Largent, Pro Football Hall of Famer (Tulsa, Houston Oilers, Seattle Seahawks); former congressman
- Bryan McCann, professional American football player (SMU, Dallas Cowboys, Baltimore Ravens, Oakland Raiders, Miami Dolphins, Arizona Cardinals, Washington Redskins)
- Mary Millben, singer and actress
- Joseph Opala, public historian, Africa scholar, and human rights activist
- Ed Roberts, poet
- Pat Ryan, former college (University of Tennessee) and NFL football player (New York Jets and Philadelphia Eagles)
- Bob Shirley, Major League Baseball pitcher
- Christopher Wise, scholar and professor of English and Comparative Literature at Western Washington University
