= Bethany, Oklahoma =

- City
- City of Bethany
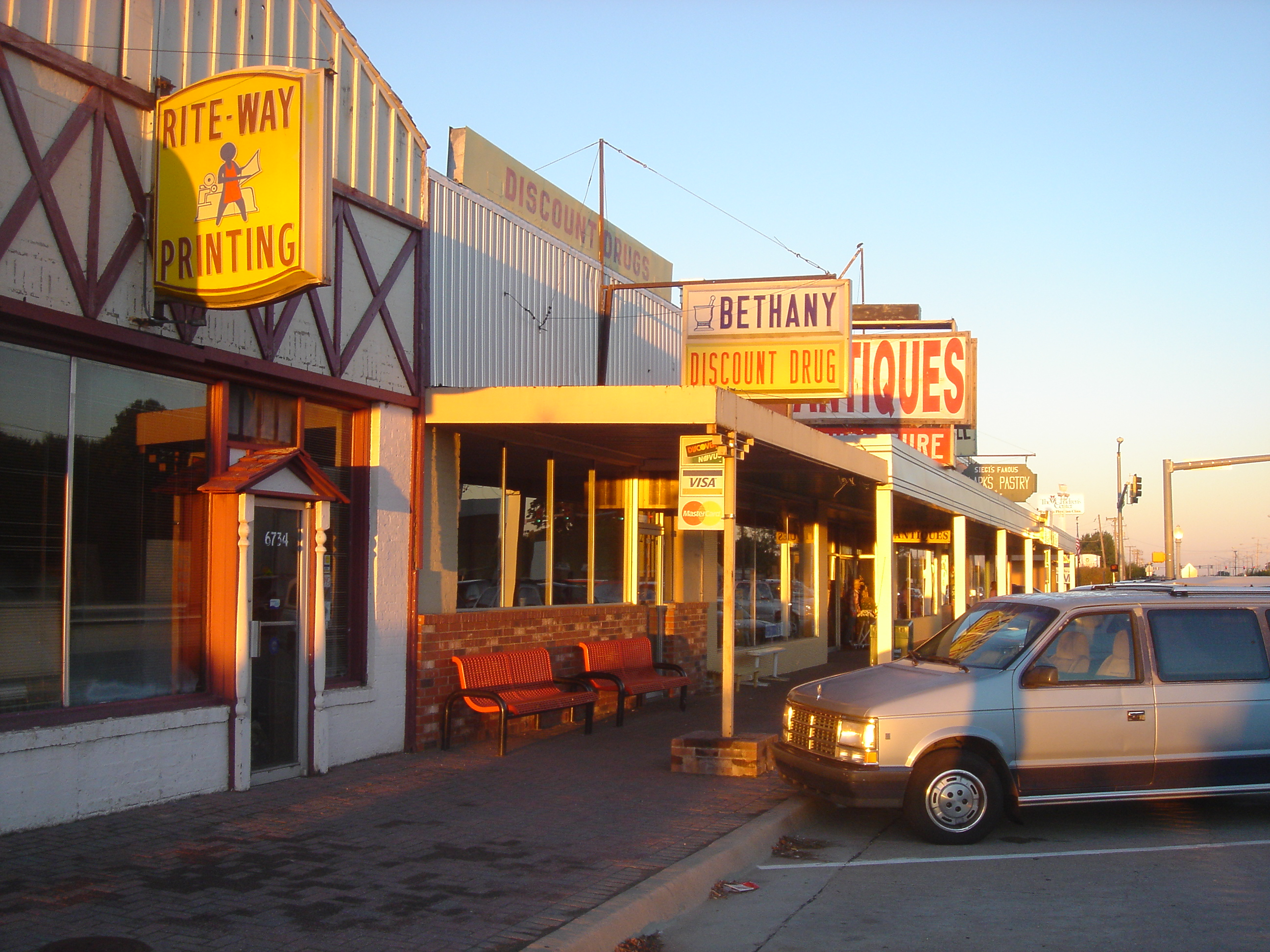
- Downtown Bethany in 2007

- Seal

- Location in Oklahoma County and the state of Oklahoma.

- Location in the United States
- Coordinates: 35°30′17″N 97°38′20″W
- Country: United States
- State: Oklahoma
- County: Oklahoma

Government
  - Type: Council-manager

Area
  - Total: 5.23 sq mi (13.54 km^{2})
  - Land: 5.23 sq mi (13.54 km^{2})
  - Water: 0 sq mi (0.00 km^{2})
- Elevation: 1,309 ft (399 m)

Population (2020)
  - Total: 20,831
  - Density: 3,984.4/sq mi (1,538.38/km^{2})
- Time zone: UTC-6 (Central (CST))
  - Summer (DST): UTC-5 (CDT)
- ZIP code: 73008
- Area code: 405
- FIPS code: 40-05700
- GNIS feature ID: 2409839
- Website: City of Bethany

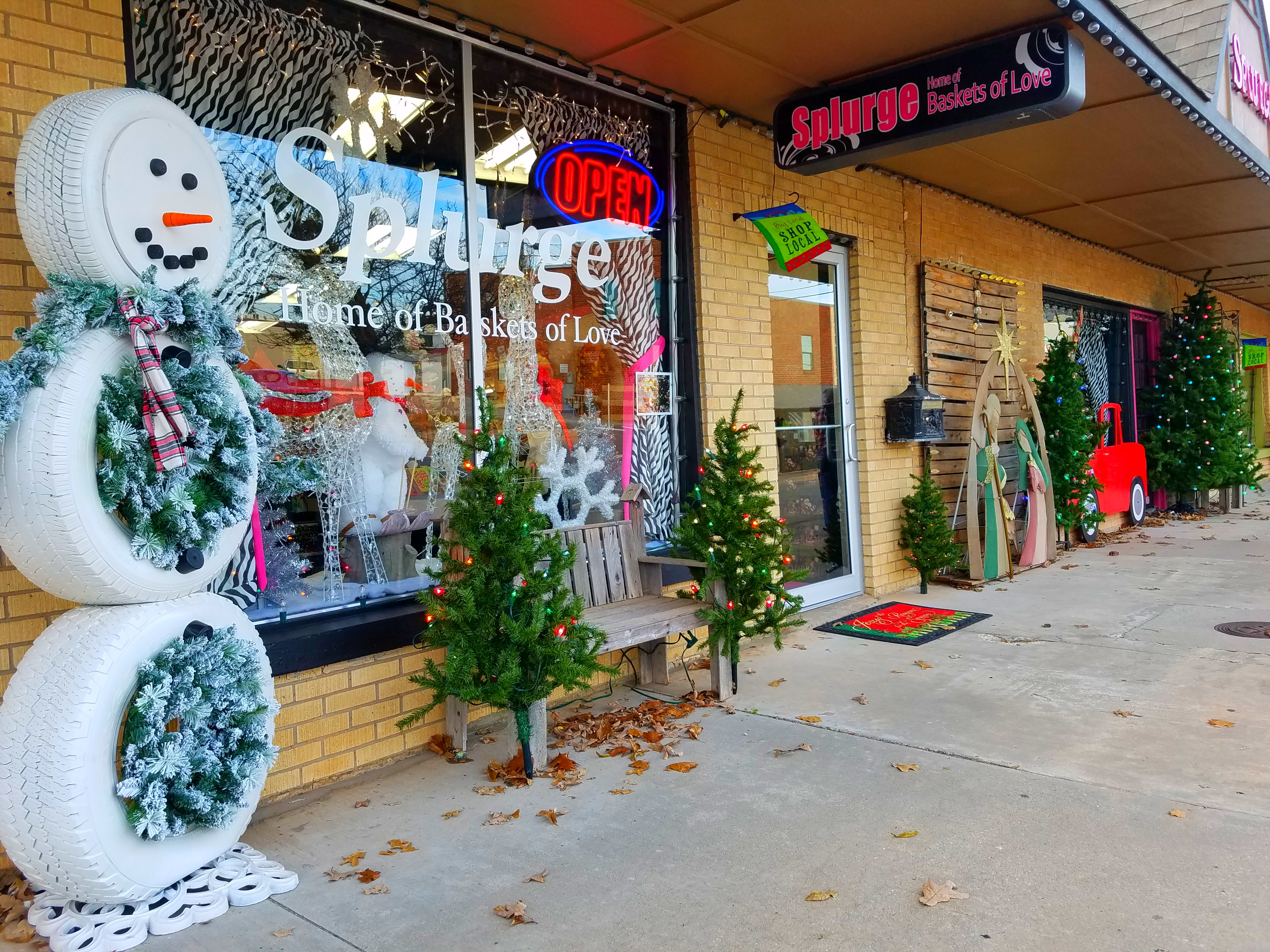
Photo taken during the Annual Tree Lighting Festival on December 17, 2017.

Bethany is a city in Oklahoma County, Oklahoma, United States, and a part of the Oklahoma City metropolitan area. Bethany has a population of 20,831 at the 2020 census, a 9.3% increase from 2010. The community was founded in 1909 by followers of the Church of the Nazarene from Oklahoma City.

== History ==
Bethany was founded July 28, 1909 as a community where members of the Church of the Nazarene, an evangelical Christian movement that developed from Holiness churches, could practice their religious beliefs without interference by non-members. The town was named after the biblical place of Bethany. The community quickly founded Oklahoma Holiness College (now known as Southern Nazarene University, SNU). Two other institutions were soon established, the Oklahoma Orphanage (now the Children's Center, a medical facility) operated by Mattie Mallory, and the Nazarene Rescue Home for unwed mothers.

Bethany incorporated on August 8, 1910 as a rural town; its economy depended on the surrounding farmlands. It gained a post office on March 11, 1913. With a relatively large population of conservative Nazarenes, the town council soon enacted strict blue laws that banned alcohol, tobacco, gambling, dancing, movies, swearing, and working on Sundays. After Bethany reorganized as a first class city in 1931, it relaxed these laws to some extent.

An F4 tornado struck Bethany on November 19, 1930, killing 23 people and destroying 652 buildings. It is one of three documented violent November tornadoes in Oklahoma since 1900. Recovery from the storm was slow until the outbreak of World War II. Defense industries rapidly developed in the area, and the city added population as bedroom community, or suburb for workers commuting to Oklahoma City.

== Geography ==
The city is in the central part of Oklahoma County, approximately 10 miles (16 km) west of downtown Oklahoma City, and is bounded by Warr Acres on the east and by Lake Overholser and Stinchcomb Wildlife Refuge on the west.

According to the United States Census Bureau, the city has a total area of 5.2 square miles (13 km^{2}), all land.

== Demographics ==
Historical population
Census	Pop.	Note	%±
1920	485		—
1930	2,032		319.0%
1940	2,590		27.5%
1950	5,705		120.3%
1960	12,342		116.3%
1970	22,694		83.9%
1980	22,038		−2.9%
1990	20,075		−8.9%
2000	20,307		1.2%
2010	19,051		−6.2%
2020	20,831		9.3%

=== 2020 census ===
As of the 2020 census, Bethany had a population of 20,831. The median age was 34.7 years. 24.7% of residents were under the age of 18 and 16.4% of residents were 65 years of age or older. For every 100 females there were 96.7 males, and for every 100 females age 18 and over there were 91.7 males age 18 and over.

100.0% of residents lived in urban areas, while <0.1% lived in rural areas.

There were 7,908 households in Bethany, of which 33.8% had children under the age of 18 living in them. Of all households, 40.1% were married-couple households, 20.6% were households with a male householder and no spouse or partner present, and 31.8% were households with a female householder and no spouse or partner present. About 30.6% of all households were made up of individuals and 13.4% had someone living alone who was 65 years of age or older.

There were 8,850 housing units, of which 10.6% were vacant. Among occupied housing units, 53.8% were owner-occupied and 46.2% were renter-occupied. The homeowner vacancy rate was 1.7% and the rental vacancy rate was 12.8%.

Racial composition as of the 2020 census
Race	Percent
White	59.7%
Black or African American	8.5%
American Indian and Alaska Native	3.3%
Asian	1.4%
Native Hawaiian and Other Pacific Islander	0.1%
Some other race	12.2%
Two or more races	14.9%
Hispanic or Latino (of any race)	23.8%

=== 2000 census ===
As of the census of 2000, there were 20,307 people, 8,161 households, and 5,280 families residing in the city. The population density was 3,896.7 inhabitants per square mile (1,504.5/km^{2}). There were 8,874 housing units at an average density of 1,702.8 per square mile (657.5/km^{2}). The racial makeup of the city was 85.79% White, 4.36% African American, 2.87% Native American, 1.38% Asian, 0.05% Pacific Islander, 2.18% from other races, and 3.36% from two or more races. Hispanic or Latino of any race were 5.80% of the population.

There were 8,161 households, out of which 28.1% had children under the age of 18 living with them, 49.0% were married couples living together, 12.1% had a female householder with no husband present, and 35.3% were non-families. 31.0% of all households were made up of individuals, and 12.2% had someone living alone who was 65 years of age or older. The average household size was 2.33 and the average family size was 2.91.

In the city, the population was spread out, with 23.0% under the age of 18, 12.9% from 18 to 24, 25.8% from 25 to 44, 21.5% from 45 to 64, and 16.7% who were 65 years of age or older. The median age was 36 years. For every 100 females, there were 89.7 males. For every 100 females age 18 and over, there were 84.4 males.

The median income for a household in the city was $35,073, and the median income for a family was $43,905. Males had a median income of $30,180 versus $24,747 for females. The per capita income for the city was $17,793. About 6.9% of families and 9.0% of the population were below the poverty line, including 12.7% of those under age 18 and 3.9% of those age 65 or over.

== Economy ==
The largest employers in the area include: Southern Nazarene University, Southwestern Christian University, The Children's Center, Bethany and Putnam City Public Schools, City of Bethany, and Gilbert Medical Clinic. Bethany became the headquarters for the International Pentecostal Holiness Church in 1975. It is also the headquarters for the Pinto Horse Association of America.

== Government ==
=== City ===
The city operates using a council-manager government system. The city council comprises two members elected from each of the four wards. The city manager, city attorney, and municipal judge are appointed by the council. The mayor is elected at large. The current mayor is Amanda Sandoval.

=== State ===
Most of Bethany is represented in the Oklahoma Senate by Julia Kirt, with some areas falling into the districts of Carrie Hicks and Greg Treat. It is represented in the Oklahoma House of Representatives by Tammy West and Marilyn Stark.

== Education ==
=== Public schools ===
Both Bethany School District and the Putnam City School District provide educational needs to citizens within its district borders; the former includes central Bethany while the latter includes the majority of Bethany.

The chief educational providers for elementary-aged students include the Southern Nazarene University School for Children on the campus of Calvary Church of the Nazarene, about 1 mile south of Southern Nazarene University, as well as Bethany Earl Harris Elementary. Primary school goes from pre-K - 5th grade. Bethany Middle School and Western Oaks Junior High School respond to those in 6th - 8th grade. Bethany High School, home of the Bronchos, covers grades 9th - 12th. Putnam City schools located within Bethany include: Apollo Elementary, Lake Park Elementary, Overholser Elementary, Western Oaks Elementary, and Western Oaks Middle School.

Much of the Putnam City areas are zoned to Putnam City West High School.

The superintendent for Bethany Public Schools is Dr. Reuben Bellows. The website for Bethany Public Schools is http://bethanyschools.com/.

The superintendent for Putnam City Schools is Dr. Fred Rhodes. The website for Putnam City Schools is http://putnamcityschools.org/.

=== Higher education ===
Bethany is home to two universities: Southern Nazarene University (SNU) and Southwestern Christian University (SWCU).

SNU offers adult degree completion and many masters programs including an MBA with evening classes. Southwestern Christian University is a Holiness–Pentecostal university specializing in Bible and Christian ministries and offers adult degree completion and master programs.

=== Public libraries ===
Metropolitan Library System operates the Bethany Library, which has 23,000 square feet (2,100 m^{2}) of space. It began operations on January 31, 1965 in a different facility. The current facility opened on November 16, 2019, built from a bond approved on April 5, 2016.

== Transportation ==
Wiley Post Airport handles business and commercial aircraft. It also has an industrial park that contains about fifty aviation-related businesses, including Rockwell International (an aircraft manufacturer), Million Air, Servicenter Incorporated, and the Federal Aviation Administration Systems Management Office.

The main vehicular route in and out of Bethany is the 39th Street Expressway (part of Historic Route 66), which runs through downtown Bethany.

== Attractions ==
The Bethany parks and recreation system includes many small neighborhood parks, and four large parks, Eldon Lyon Park, McFarland Park, Ripper Park, and Stinchcomb Wildlife Refuge. Eldon Lyon Park is the venue for the annual Fourth of July festival, which is an all-day event with fireworks, a carnival, and a parade that starts on main street. Downtown festivals include Bethany66, the Annual Tree Lighting, Cinco de Mayo and is home to many special one-time musical events hosted by main street businesses.

== Notable people ==
- Chris Chamberlain (born 1985), professional football player, born in Bethany
- Shannon Lucid (born 1943), biochemist and astronaut, raised in Bethany and attended Bethany High School
- Allie Reynolds (1917–1994), professional baseball pitcher, born in Bethany
- Payton Tolle (born 2002), professional baseball pitcher, attended Bethany High School
