= Putnam City Schools =

School district in Oklahoma, United States

Address
- 5401 Northwest 40th Street Oklahoma City, Oklahoma, 73122; United States

District information
- Type: Public
- Motto: Go Boldly
- Grades: PreK–12
- Established: 1914
- Superintendent: Dr. Kenny Rodrequez
- NCES District ID: 4025290

Students and staff
- Students: ~18,829
- Teachers: ~1,300 (FTE)
- Staff: ~800 (FTE)

Other information
- Website: www.putnamcityschools.org

The Putnam City School District is a public school district based in northwest Oklahoma City, Oklahoma. It serves approximately 19,000 students and includes 27 schools.

It serves Warr Acres, Woodlawn Park, most of Bethany, and parts of northwest Oklahoma City.

The district was formed in 1914 and is the first independent public school district in the State of Oklahoma.

== Schools ==
- Putnam City High School
- Putnam City North High School
- Putnam City West High School
- Putnam City Academy
- Kenneth Cooper Middle School
- Hefner Middle School
- James L. Capps Middle School
- Mayfield Middle School
- Western Oaks Middle School
- Arbor Grove Elementary School
- Apollo Elementary School
- Central Elementary School
- Coronado Heights Elementary School
- James L. Dennis Elementary School
- Harvest Hills Elementary School
- Hilldale Elementary School
- Denver Dee Kirkland Elementary School
- Lake Park Elementary School
- Northridge Elementary School
- Overholser Elementary School
- Ralph Downs Elementary School
- Rollingwood Elementary School
- Tulakes Elementary School
- Western Oaks Elementary School
- Wiley Post Elementary School
- Will Rogers Elementary School
- Windsor Hills Elementary School
